= 2020–21 K Beerschot VA season =

K Beerschot VA
2020–21 season
- Chairman: Francis Vrancken
- Manager: William Still (from 19 January 2021); Hernán Losada (until 18 January 2021)
- Stadium: Olympisch Stadion
- Belgian First Division A: 9th
- Belgian Cup: Seventh round
- Top goalscorer: League: Raphael Holzhauser (15); All: Raphael Holzhauser (15)
Home colours	Away colours

The 2020–21 K Beerschot VA season was the club's eighth season in existence and its first season in the top flight of Belgian football. In addition to the domestic league, Beerschot participated in this season's edition of the Belgian Cup. The season covered the period from 3 August 2020 to 30 June 2021.

== Players ==
=== First-team squad ===
As of 29 January 2021

Note: Flags indicate national team as defined under FIFA eligibility rules; some limited exceptions apply. Players may hold more than one non-FIFA nationality.

No.	Pos.	Nation	Player
1	GK	BEL	Wouter Biebauw
2	DF	BEL	Jan Van den Bergh
3	DF	UKR	Denis Prychynenko
4	DF	BEL	Frédéric Frans
5	MF	BEL	Joren Dom
7	FW	NGR	Blessing Eleke
8	MF	AUT	Raphael Holzhauser
9	FW	CMR	Marius Noubissi
10	FW	JPN	Musashi Suzuki
15	DF	FRA	Pierre Bourdin
16	MF	BEL	Tom Pietermaat
18	MF	BEL	Ryan Sanusi
21	MF	ENG	George Broadbent (on loan from Sheffield United)
22	MF	GAM	Abdoulie Sanyang

No.	Pos.	Nation	Player
24	DF	KAZ	Yan Vorogovskiy
27	DF	ALG	Réda Halaïmia
28	MF	MLI	Ismaila Coulibaly (on loan from Sheffield United)
31	GK	BEL	Mike Vanhamel
36	MF	BEL	Senne Ceulemans
37	MF	BEL	Isaac Matondo Kwanzambi
38	FW	BEL	David Mukuna-Trouet
55	DF	CRO	Stipe Radić
72	GK	BEL	Antoine Lejoly
79	DF	BEL	Ayrton Mboko
89	DF	BEL	Grégory Grisez
92	FW	BEL	Loris Brogno
99	FW	BEL	Zakaria Bakkali (on loan from Anderlecht)

=== Out on loan ===
Note: Flags indicate national team as defined under FIFA eligibility rules; some limited exceptions apply. Players may hold more than one non-FIFA nationality.

No.	Pos.	Nation	Player
6	DF	BEL	Dario Van den Buijs (at Fortuna Sittard)
11	FW	TOG	Euloge Placca (at Lierse Kempenzonen)
13	FW	CGO	Prince Ibara (at Neftçi)
17	FW	BEL	Brian De Keersmaecker (at FC Eindhoven)
19	MF	BEL	Keres Masangu (at HNK Šibenik)
77	MF	BEL	Jorn Vancamp (at FC Eindhoven)
99	FW	BRA	Felipe Micael (at Al Hilal United FC)

== Pre-season and friendlies ==
Win Draw Loss

8 July 2020 Friendly	Club Brugge	1–1	Beerschot	Knokke-Heist, Belgium
17:00 CEST (UTC+2)				Stadium: Complex Molenhoek

18 July 2020 Friendly	Sint-Truiden	0–0	Beerschot	Geel, Belgium
17:00 CEST (UTC+2)				Stadium: De Leunen

26 July 2020 Friendly	Beerschot	1–1	Patro Eisden	Hoboken, Belgium
18:00 CEST (UTC+2)				Stadium: Stadion De Visputten

== Competitions ==
=== Overview ===
Competition	First match	Last match	Starting round	Final position	Record							
Competition	First match	Last match	Starting round	Final position	Pld	W	D	L	GF	GA	GD	Win %
Belgian First Division A	10 August 2020	18 April 2021	Matchday 1	9th	34	14	5	15	58	64	−6	41.18
Belgian Cup	2 February 2021	11 February 2021	Sixth round	Seventh round	2	1	0	1	5	1	+4	50.00
Total					36	15	5	16	63	65	−2	41.67

Last updated: 18 April 2021
Source: Soccerway

=== Belgian First Division A ===
==== League table ====
Pos	Team	Pld	W	D	L	GF	GA	GD	Pts	Qualification or relegation
7	Gent	34	14	7	13	55	42	+13	49	Qualification for the Play-offs II
8	Mechelen	34	13	9	12	54	54	0	48	Qualification for the Play-offs II
9	Beerschot	34	14	5	15	58	64	−6	47	
10	Zulte Waregem	34	14	4	16	53	69	−16	46	
11	OH Leuven	34	12	9	13	54	59	−5	45	

Source: Jupiler Pro League (in Dutch), Soccerway
Rules for classification: 1) Points; 2) Matches won; 3) Goal difference; 4) Goals scored; 5) Away matches won; 6) Away goal difference; 7) Away goals scored; 8) Play-off.

==== Results summary ====
Overall								Home						Away					
Pld	W	D	L	GF	GA	GD	Pts	W	D	L	GF	GA	GD	W	D	L	GF	GA	GD
34	14	5	15	58	64	−6	47	7	4	6	32	29	+3	7	1	9	26	35	−9

Last updated: 18 April 2021.
Source: Jupiler Pro League

==== Results by round ====
Round	1	2	3	4	5	6	7	8	9	10	11	12	13	14	15	16	17	18	19	20	21	22	23	24	25	26	27	28	29	30	31	32	33	34
Ground	A	H	A	H	H	A	H	A	H	A	H	A	H	A	H	A	H	A	A	H	H	A	A	H	A	H	H	A	H	A	H	A	H	A
Result	W	W	W	L	W	L	W	L	W	L	W	D	W	W	L	L	D	L	L	D	L	L	W	D	W	L	L	W	D	W	W	L	L	L
Position	2	1	1	3	2	4	3	4	4	4	3	3	2	2	3	4	6	7	7	7	10	10	9	9	7	8	10	8	8	6	7	6	6	9

Updated to match(es) played on 18 April 2021. Source: Jupiler Pro League
A = Away; H = Home; W = Win; D = Draw; L = Loss

==== Matches ====
The league fixtures were announced on 8 July 2020.

10 August 2020 1	Oostende	1–2	Beerschot	Ostend
19:00 CEST (UTC+2)	Tanghe (yellow card) 19'; Gueye (yellow card) 22'; Vandendriessche 63'; Kvasina (yellow card) 72'	Report	Noubissi 1', 74'; Prychynenko (yellow card) 60'; Van den Buijs (yellow card) 83'	Stadium: Versluys Arena; Attendance: 0 Referee: Bram Van Driessche

16 August 2020 2	Beerschot	3–1	Zulte Waregem	Antwerp
16:00 CEST (UTC+2)	Tissoudali 32'; Sanusi (yellow card) 56'; Pietermaat (yellow card) 67'; Holzhauser 68', 87'; Eleke (yellow card) 90+2'	Report	Berahino 57'; Srarfi (yellow card) 64'; Govea (yellow card) 67'	Stadium: Olympisch Stadion; Attendance: 0 Referee: Bert Put

23 August 2020 3	Club Brugge	0–1	Beerschot	Bruges
16:00 CEST (UTC+2)	Balanta (yellow card) 76'	Report	Holzhauser 28'	Stadium: Jan Breydel Stadium; Attendance: 0 Referee: Alexandre Boucaut

30 August 2020 4	Beerschot	0–3	Standard Liège	Antwerp
16:00 CEST (UTC+2)	Sanusi (yellow card) 26'; Vorogovskiy (yellow card) 80'; Holzhauser (yellow card) 82'	Report	Avenatti 32'; Fai (yellow card) 73'; Lestienne 76'; Oularé 83'	Stadium: Olympisch Stadion; Attendance: 0 Referee: Nathan Verboomen

14 September 2020 5	Beerschot	5–2	Genk	Antwerp
20:45 CEST (UTC+2)	Holzhauser 12', 63' (pen.); Bourdin 49'; Vorogovskiy 85'; Noubissi 90'	Report	Onuachu 19' (pen.); Cuesta (yellow card) 58' (yellow-red card) 59'; Bongonda (red card) 68'; Lucumí (yellow card) 74'; Dessers 76' (pen.)	Stadium: Olympisch Stadion; Attendance: 3,200; Referee: Frederik Geldhof

18 September 2020 6	Charleroi	3–1	Beerschot	Charleroi
20:45 CEST (UTC+2)	Rezaei 29', 87' (pen.); Gholizadeh 55'	Report	Sanusi (yellow card) 54'; Suzuki 90+1'	Stadium: Stade du Pays de Charleroi; Attendance: 4,706; Referee: Kevin van Damme

26 September 2020 7	Beerschot	3–2	Waasland-Beveren	Antwerp
16:15 CEST (UTC+2)	Tissoudali 42'; Noubissi (yellow card) 64'; Suzuki 79'; Brogno 90+6'	Report	Efford 11'; Heymans 14'; Bertone (yellow card) 82'; Schryvers (yellow card) 90+7'	Stadium: Olympisch Stadion; Attendance: 3,200; Referee: Wesli De Cremer

4 October 2020 8	Gent	5–1	Beerschot	Ghent
16:00 CEST (UTC+2)	Yaremchuk 12', 15'; Depoitre 29', 61'; Marreh (yellow card) 51'; Samoise 79'	Report	Dom (yellow card) 78'; Coulibaly 90+1'	Stadium: Ghelamco Arena; Attendance: 7,995; Referee: Lothar D'hondt

17 October 2020 9	Beerschot	6–3	Sint-Truiden	Antwerp
18:30 CEST (UTC+2)	Holzhauser 2', 25' (pen.); Tissoudali 17', 34'; Brogno 40'; Coulibaly 57'	Report	Filippov 44'; Suzuki 49'; Nazon 74'	Stadium: Olympisch Stadion; Attendance: 3,200; Referee: Jan Boterberg

25 October 2020 10	Antwerp	3–2	Beerschot	Antwerp
13:30 CET (UTC+1)	Refaelov 7'; Juklerød 15'; Hongla (yellow card) 34'; Gerkens (yellow card) 37'; Mbokani 74'; Haroun (yellow card) 78'; Buta (yellow card) 81'	Report	Suzuki 25', 73'; Frans (yellow card) 27'; Sanyang (yellow card) 86'	Stadium: Bosuilstadion; Attendance: 0 Referee: Jasper Vergoote

31 October 2020 11	Beerschot	4–2	OH Leuven	Antwerp
16:15 CET (UTC+1)	Tissoudali 21'; Suzuki 25'; Pietermaat (yellow card) 32'; Coulibaly (yellow card) 45'; Van den Bergh (yellow card) 56'; Sanusi 62'; Holzhauser 65'; Dom (yellow card) 74'; Bourdin (yellow card) 79'	Report	Mercier 16'; Henry 82' (pen.); Jemelka (yellow card) 87'	Stadium: Olympisch Stadion; Attendance: 0 Referee: Nicolas Laforge

7 November 2020 12	Kortrijk	5–5	Beerschot	Kortrijk
16:15 CET (UTC+1)	Jonckheere 1'; Selemani 8'; Mboyo 57' (pen.); Gueye 68'; Sainsbury (yellow card) 84', (goal) 90+4'; De Sart (yellow card) 87'	Report	Vorogovskiy (yellow card) 28'; Bourdin 39', 74'; Sanusi (yellow card) 43'; Holzhauser 49' (pen.); Tissoudali 50'; Frans 88'	Stadium: Guldensporen Stadion; Attendance: 0 Referee: Jasper Vergoote

22 November 2020 13	Beerschot	2–1	Anderlecht	Antwerp
13:30 CET (UTC+1)	Coulibaly 29'; Frans (yellow card) 42'; Holzhauser 50'; Tissoudali (yellow card) 70'	Report	Lawrence (yellow card) 21'; Žulj (yellow card) 60'; Nmecha 87'	Stadium: Olympisch Stadion; Attendance: 0 Referee: Alexandre Boucaut

29 November 2020 14	KV Mechelen	2–3	Beerschot	Mechelen
13:30 CET (UTC+1)	Frans 21' (o.g.); Vanlerberghe (yellow card) 39'; Mboko 44' (o.g.); Vranckx (red card) 60'; Storm (yellow card) 67'; Hairemans (yellow card) 68'; Schoofs (yellow card) 74'	Report	Tissoudali 13'; Coulibaly (yellow card) 18', (goal) 80'; Pietermaat (yellow card) 42'; Van den Bergh 69'	Stadium: Achter de Kazerne; Attendance: 0 Referee: Lawrence Visser

6 December 2020 15	Beerschot	0–1	Eupen	Antwerp
16:00 CET (UTC+1)	Mboko (yellow card) 40'; Vorogovskiy (yellow card) 40'; Bourdin (yellow card) 86'	Report	Agbadou 35'; Ngoy (yellow card) 54'; Schouterden (yellow card) 61'	Stadium: Olympisch Stadion; Attendance: 0 Referee: Jonathan Lardot

12 December 2020 16	Excel Mouscron	3–1	Beerschot	Mouscron
16:15 CET (UTC+1)				Stadium: Stade Le Canonnier; Attendance: 0

27 December 2020 18	Anderlecht	2–0	Beerschot	Anderlecht
18:15 CET (UTC+1)	Nmecha 32'; Mukairu 71'	Report		Stadium: Constant Vanden Stock Stadium; Attendance: 0 Referee: Nicolas Laforge

30 December 2020 19	Sint-Truiden	1–0	Beerschot	Sint-Truiden
20:45 CET (UTC+1)	Suzuki 41'; Konaté (yellow card) 73'; Buatu (yellow card) 75'; Cacace (yellow card) 90+5'	Report		Stadium: Stayen; Attendance: 0 Referee: Christof Dierick

10 January 2021 30	Beerschot	1–1	Gent	Antwerp
16:00 CET (UTC+1)	Holzhauser (penalty missed) 8'; Coulibaly 23'; Frans (yellow card) 42'; Suzuki (yellow card) 49'; Vorogovskiy (yellow card) 90'; Van den Bergh (yellow card) 90+1'	Report	Bolat (yellow card) 8'; Kums 43' (pen.); Marreh (yellow card) 87'	Stadium: Olympisch Stadion; Attendance: 0 Referee: Lawrence Visser

13 January 2021 17	Beerschot	1–1	Cercle Brugge	Antwerp
18:30 CET (UTC+1)	Vorogovskiy (yellow card) 14'; Suzuki 22'; Sanusi (yellow card) 89'	Report	Hazard (yellow card) 57'; Musaba 89'	Stadium: Olympisch Stadion; Attendance: 0 Referee: Wim Smet

17 January 2021 20	Beerschot	0–3	Club Brugge	Antwerp
18:15 CET (UTC+1)	Van den Buijs (yellow card) 43'; Coulibaly (yellow card) 66'; Van den Bergh (yellow card) 67'	Report	Dost 15'; Kossounou 19'; Sobol (yellow card) 48'; Lang 82', (yellow card) 83'	Stadium: Olympisch Stadion; Attendance: 0 Referee: Lothar D'hondt

20 January 2021 21	Eupen	3–1	Beerschot	Eupen
18:45 CET (UTC+1)	Prevljak 10'; N'Dri 40'; Koch 54'	Report	Noubissi 2'; Brogno (red card) 71'; Van den Buijs (yellow card) 80'; Eleke (yellow card) 90+1'	Stadium: Kehrwegstadion; Attendance: 0 Referee: Jonathan Lardot

24 January 2021 22	Zulte Waregem	0–3	Beerschot	Waregem
16:00 CET (UTC+1)		Report	Van den Bergh 54'; Dom 75'; Prychynenko 90+1' (pen.)	Stadium: Regenboogstadion; Attendance: 0 Referee: Christof Dierick

27 January 2021 23	Beerschot	0–0	Kortrijk	Antwerp
18:45 CET (UTC+1)		Report		Stadium: Olympisch Stadion; Attendance: 0 Referee: Jan Boterberg

30 January 2021 24	OH Leuven	0–1	Beerschot	Leuven
18:30 CET (UTC+1)	Sowah (yellow card) 34'; Henry (yellow card) 48'; Schrijvers (yellow card) 90+3'	Report	Pietermaat (yellow card) 41'; Prychynenko (yellow card) 72'; Tissoudali 74'	Stadium: Den Dreef; Attendance: 0 Referee: Bert Put

7 February 2021 25	Beerschot	1–2	Antwerp	Antwerp
13:30 CET (UTC+1)	Pietermaat (yellow card) 20'; Van den Bergh (yellow card) 39'; Sanyang (yellow card) 69'; Bourdin (yellow card) 77'; Frans 89'	Report	De Laet (yellow card) 71'; Lamkel Zé 84', (yellow card) 85'; Gerkens 87'; Refaelov (yellow card) 90+3'	Stadium: Olympisch Stadion; Attendance: 0 Referee: Jonathan Lardot

14 February 2021 26	Beerschot	1–2	KV Mechelen	Antwerp
16:00 CET (UTC+1)	Radić (yellow card) 34'; Holzhauser 52' (pen.); Brogno (yellow card) 81'	Report	Walsh 90'; Druijf 90+4'	Stadium: Olympisch Stadion; Attendance: 0 Referee: Nathan Verboomen

21 February 2021 27	Genk	1–2	Beerschot	Genk
18:15 CET (UTC+1)	Bongonda (yellow card) 66'; Muñoz (yellow card) 81'; Hrošovský 90+3'	Report	Radić (yellow card) 14'; Sanusi (yellow card) 58'; Van den Bergh 65'; Holzhauser 82' (pen.); Pietermaat (yellow card) 89'	Stadium: Luminus Arena; Attendance: 0 Referee: Bert Put

28 February 2021 28	Beerschot	2–2	Excel Mouscron	Antwerp
16:00 CET (UTC+1)	Pietermaat (yellow card) 80'; Eleke 86'; Radić 90+4'; Van den Bergh (yellow card) 90+6'	Report	Olinga (yellow card) 23'; Onana 26'; Da Costa (yellow card) 45+3'; Tabekou 71'; Koffi (yellow card) 85'; Hočko (yellow card) 90+6'; Bakić (yellow card) 90+7'	Stadium: Olympisch Stadion; Attendance: 0 Referee: Jasper Vergoote

6 March 2021 29	Waasland-Beveren	1–2	Beerschot	Beveren
18:30 CET (UTC+1)	Heymans 8', (yellow card) 13'; Vukotić (yellow card) 90+2'	Report	Dom 34'; Holzhauser 73'; Brogno (yellow card) 80'; Radić (yellow card) 90+2'	Stadium: Freethiel Stadion; Attendance: 0 Referee: Erik Lambrechts

4 April 2021 32	Cercle Brugge	2–1	Beerschot	Bruges
13:30 CEST (UTC+2)	Biancone 18', (yellow card) 49'; Ugbo 34' (pen.), (yellow card) 73'; Velkovski (red card) 38'; Lopes (yellow card) 44'	Report	Sanusi (yellow card) 33'; Van den Bergh 50'	Stadium: Jan Breydel Stadium; Attendance: 0 Referee: Bram Van Driessche

7 April 2021 31	Beerschot	2–1	Charleroi	Antwerp
19:00 CEST (UTC+2)	Holzhauser 34' (pen.), 90+4' (pen.), (yellow card) 90+4'; Van den Bergh (yellow card) 90+7'	Report	Fall (yellow card) 26'; Van Cleemput (yellow card) 33'; Nicholson 70'	Stadium: Olympisch Stadion; Attendance: 0 Referee: Jonathan Lardot

11 April 2021 33	Beerschot	1–2	Oostende	Antwerp
20:45 CEST (UTC+2)	Brogno 23', (yellow card) 63'	Report	Kvasina 81'; Bataille 84', (yellow card) 88'; Thiam (yellow card) 90+2'	Stadium: Olympisch Stadion; Attendance: 0 Referee: Nicolas Laforge

18 April 2021 34	Standard Liège	3–0	Beerschot	Liège
18:00 CEST (UTC+2)	Muleka (yellow card) 6', (goal) 86'; Klauss 44'; Amallah 60' (pen.)	Report	Pietermaat (yellow card) 26'; Dom (yellow card) 90+4'	Stadium: Stade Maurice Dufrasne; Attendance: 0 Referee: Erik Lambrechts

=== Belgian Cup ===
2 February 2021 Sixth round	Dessel	0–5	Beerschot	Dessel
18:00 CET (UTC+1)				Stadium: Armand Melisstadion
Note: On 17 January 2021, Dessel forfeited the match against Beerschot which progressed automatically to the seventh round.

11 February 2021 Seventh round	Beerschot	0–1	KV Mechelen	Antwerp
18:00 CET (UTC+1)	Van den Bergh (yellow card) 21'; Prychynenko (yellow card) 54'	Report	Schoofs 41'; Kaya (yellow card) 86'; Kaboré (yellow card) 89'	Stadium: Olympic Stadium; Attendance: 0 Referee: Kevin Van Damme

== Statistics ==
=== Squad appearances and goals ===
Last updated 22 November 2020.

No.	Pos	Nat	Player	Total		Belgian Division		Belgian Cup	
No.	Pos	Nat	Player	Apps	Goals	Apps	Goals	Apps	Goals
Goalkeepers
1	GK	(Belgium) BEL	Wouter Biebauw	0	0	0	0	0	0
31	GK	(Belgium) BEL	Mike Vanhamel	13	0	13	0	0	0
72	GK	(Belgium) BEL	Antoine Lejoly	0	0	0	0	0	0
Defenders
2	DF	(Belgium) BEL	Jan Van den Bergh	8	0	7+1	0	0	0
3	DF	(Ukraine) UKR	Denis Prychynenko	6	0	5+1	0	0	0
4	DF	(Belgium) BEL	Frédéric Frans	12	1	12	1	0	0
6	DF	(Belgium) BEL	Dario Van den Buijs	10	0	3+7	0	0	0
15	DF	(France) FRA	Pierre Bourdin	12	3	9+3	3	0	0
24	DF	(Kazakhstan) KAZ	Yan Vorogovskiy	9	1	8+1	1	0	0
27	DF	(Algeria) ALG	Réda Halaïmia	8	0	5+3	0	0	0
79	DF	(Belgium) BEL	Ayrton Mboko	0	0	0	0	0	0
89	DF	(Belgium) BEL	Grégory Grisez	1	0	0+1	0	0	0
Midfielders
5	MF	(Belgium) BEL	Joren Dom	13	0	13	0	0	0
8	MF	(Austria) AUT	Raphael Holzhauser	13	10	13	10	0	0
16	MF	(Belgium) BEL	Tom Pietermaat	10	0	9+1	0	0	0
18	MF	(Belgium) BEL	Ryan Sanusi	13	1	13	1	0	0
19	MF	(Belgium) BEL	Keres Masangu	0	0	0	0	0	0
22	MF	(The Gambia) GAM	Abdoulie Sanyang	5	0	1+4	0	0	0
28	MF	(Mali) MLI	Ismaila Coulibaly	6	3	6	3	0	0
36	MF	(Belgium) BEL	Senne Ceulemans	0	0	0	0	0	0
37	MF	(Belgium) BEL	Isaac Matondo Kwanzambi	0	0	0	0	0	0
Forwards
7	FW	(Nigeria) NGR	Blessing Eleke	3	0	0+3	0	0	0
9	FW	(Cameroon) CMR	Marius Noubissi	9	3	7+2	3	0	0
10	FW	(Japan) JPN	Musashi Suzuki	9	5	6+3	5	0	0
34	FW	(Morocco) MAR	Tarik Tissoudali	13	6	12+1	6	0	0
38	FW	(Belgium) BEL	David Mukuna-Trouet	2	0	0+2	0	0	0
92	FW	(Belgium) BEL	Loris Brogno	4	2	1+3	2	0	0
Players who have made an appearance this season but have left the club

=== Goalscorers ===
As of 17 January 2021

Rank	No.	Pos	Nat	Name	Pro League	Belgian Cup	Total
1	8	MF	(Austria)	Raphael Holzhauser	11	0	11
2	34	FW	(Morocco)	Tarik Tissoudali	8	0	8
3	10	FW	(Japan)	Musashi Suzuki	6	0	6
4	28	MF	(Mali)	Ismaila Coulibaly	5	0	5
5	15	DF	(France)	Pierre Bourdin	3	0	3
6	9	FW	(Cameroon)	Marius Noubissi	2	0	2
6	92	FW	(Belgium)	Loris Brogno	2	0	2
8	2	DF	(Belgium)	Jan Van den Bergh	1	0	1
8	4	DF	(Belgium)	Frédéric Frans	1	0	1
8	18	MF	(Belgium)	Ryan Sanusi	1	0	1
8	24	MF	(Kazakhstan)	Yan Vorogovskiy	1	0	1
Totals					41	0	41
