= 2021–22 K Beerschot VA season =

K Beerschot VA
2021–22 season
- Chairman: Francis Vrancken
- Manager: Javier Torrente
- Stadium: Olympic Stadium
- First Division A: 18th (relegated)
- Belgian Cup: Seventh round
- Top goalscorer: League: Joren Dom; Lawrence Shankland (5 each); All: Joren Dom; Lawrence Shankland (5 each)
- All statistics correct as of 22 May 2022.

The 2021–22 season was the 123rd season in the existence of K Beerschot VA and the club's second consecutive season in the top flight of Belgian football. In addition to the domestic league, K Beerschot VA participated in this season's edition of the Belgian Cup. Beerschot was relegated to the Challenger Pro League following a difficult season where they only managed 4 league wins and 16 points.

== Players ==
=== First-team squad ===
As of 31 August 2021

Note: Flags indicate national team as defined under FIFA eligibility rules; some limited exceptions apply. Players may hold more than one non-FIFA nationality.

No.	Pos.	Nation	Player
1	GK	BEL	Wouter Biebauw
2	DF	BEL	Jan Van den Bergh
3	DF	ENG	Femi Seriki (on loan from Sheffield United)
4	DF	BEL	Frédéric Frans
5	MF	BEL	Joren Dom
8	MF	AUT	Raphael Holzhauser
9	FW	CMR	Marius Noubissi
10	FW	JPN	Musashi Suzuki
11	MF	BOL	Ramiro Vaca
15	DF	FRA	Pierre Bourdin
16	MF	BEL	Tom Pietermaat
17	FW	SCO	Lawrence Shankland
18	MF	BEL	Ryan Sanusi

No.	Pos.	Nation	Player
20	FW	URU	Felipe Avenatti (on loan from Standard Liège)
21	MF	GHA	Abraham Okyere
27	DF	ALG	Réda Halaïmia
28	MF	MLI	Ismaila Coulibaly (on loan from Sheffield United)
29	DF	BEL	Thibault De Smet (on loan from Reims)
31	GK	BEL	Mike Vanhamel
35	MF	BEL	Dante Rigo
38	FW	BEL	David Mukuna-Trouet
44	DF	URU	Mauricio Lemos (on loan from Fenerbahçe)
55	DF	CRO	Stipe Radić
66	DF	GRE	Apostolos Konstantopoulos
72	GK	BEL	Antoine Lejoly
77	FW	CRO	Leon Kreković

=== Out on loan ===
Note: Flags indicate national team as defined under FIFA eligibility rules; some limited exceptions apply. Players may hold more than one non-FIFA nationality.

No. / Pos. / Nation / Player; — / FW / NGR / Blessing Eleke (on loan at Gençlerbirliği)	No. / Pos. / Nation / Player; — / FW / TOG / Euloge Placca (on loan at Al Tadhamon)

== Pre-season and friendlies ==
Win Draw Loss Fixtures

18 June 2021 Friendly	Kontich FC (Belgium)	0–5	(Belgium) Beerschot	Kontich, Belgium
19:00 CEST (UTC+2)				Stadium: Stadion FC Kontich

23 June 2021 Friendly	Dessel Sport (Belgium)	2–5	(Belgium) Beerschot	Dessel, Belgium
19:00 CEST (UTC+2)				Stadium: Armand Melis Stadion

30 June 2021 Friendly	Beerschot (Belgium)	2–1	(Germany) SC Verl	Germany
14:00 CEST (UTC+2)

3 July 2021 Friendly	Beerschot (Belgium)	0–1	(Germany) MSV Duisburg	Belgium
15:00 CEST (UTC+2)

7 July 2021 Friendly	Beerschot (Belgium)	2–0	(Belgium) Waasland-Beveren	Belgium
18:00 CEST (UTC+2)

10 July 2021 Friendly	Beerschot (Belgium)	2–1	(Belgium) Lommel United	Belgium
17:00 CEST (UTC+2)

14 July 2021 Friendly	Beerschot (Belgium)	1–2	(Netherlands) FC Utrecht	Belgium
18:00 CEST (UTC+2)

17 July 2021 Friendly	Beerschot (Belgium)	1–1	(Netherlands) Fortuna Sittard	Belgium
--:-- CEST (UTC+2)

== Competitions ==
=== Overall record ===
Competition	First match	Last match	Starting round	Final position	Record							
Competition	First match	Last match	Starting round	Final position	Pld	W	D	L	GF	GA	GD	Win %
Belgian First Division A	27 July 2021	May 2022	Matchday 1		25	3	4	18	25	54	−29	12.00
Belgian Cup	27 October 2021	2 December 2021	Sixth round	Seventh round	2	1	0	1	4	2	+2	50.00
Total					27	4	4	19	29	56	−27	14.81

Last updated: 6 February 2022
Source: Soccerway

=== First Division A ===
==== League table ====
Pos	Team	Pld	W	D	L	GF	GA	GD	Pts	Qualification or relegation
14	Standard Liège	34	9	9	16	32	51	−19	36	
15	Eupen	34	8	8	18	37	61	−24	32	
16	Zulte Waregem	34	8	8	18	42	69	−27	32	
17	Seraing (O)	34	8	4	22	30	68	−38	28	Qualification for the Relegation play-off
18	Beerschot (R)	34	4	4	26	33	76	−43	16	Relegation to First Division B

Source: Jupiler Pro League (in Dutch), Soccerway
Rules for classification: 1) Points; 2) Matches won; 3) Goal difference; 4) Goals scored; 5) Away matches won; 6) Away goal difference; 7) Away goals scored; 8) Play-off.
(O) Play-off winners; (R) Relegated

==== Results summary ====
Overall								Home						Away					
Pld	W	D	L	GF	GA	GD	Pts	W	D	L	GF	GA	GD	W	D	L	GF	GA	GD
25	3	4	18	25	54	−29	13	3	1	9	11	24	−13	0	3	9	14	30	−16

Last updated: 6 February 2022.
Source: Jupiler Pro League

==== Results by round ====
Round	1	2	3	4	5	6	7	8	9	10	11	12	13	14	15	16	17	18	19	20	21	22	23	24	25	26	27	28	29
Ground	H	A	H	H	A	A	H	A	H	A	H	A	H	A	H	A	H	A	A	H	H								
Result	L	D	L	L	L	L	L	L	L	D	L	L	W	D	W	L	L	L	P	L	L	L	W	L	D	L			
Position	15	15	18	18	18	18	18	18	18	18	18	18	18	18	18	18	18	18	18	18	18	18	18	18	18	18	18	18	

Updated to match(es) played on 6 February 2022. Source: Jupiler Pro League
A = Away; H = Home; W = Win; D = Draw; L = Loss

==== Matches ====
The league fixtures were announced on 8 June 2021.

27 July 2021 1	Beerschot	0–1	Cercle Brugge	Antwerp
20:30 CEST (UTC+2)				Stadium: Olympic Stadium

1 August 2021 2	Gent	2–2	Beerschot	Ghent
18:30 CEST (UTC+2)				Stadium: Ghelamco Arena

7 August 2021 3	Beerschot	0–3	Union SG	Antwerp
16:15 CEST (UTC+2)	Noubissi (yellow card) 49'; Van den Bergh (yellow card) 90+4'	Report	Undav 14', 50'; Teuma (yellow card) 43'; Lapoussin 54'; Kandouss (yellow card) 84'; Marcq (yellow card) 88'	Stadium: Olympisch Stadion; Attendance: 3,000; Referee: Jan Boterberg

15 August 2021 4	Beerschot	0–1	Standard Liège	Antwerp
13:30 CEST (UTC+2)				Stadium: Olympic Stadium

22 August 2021 5	Club Brugge	3–2	Beerschot	Bruges
18:30 CEST (UTC+2)	Álvarez 4'; De Ketelaere 30'; Persyn 55'	Report	Dom 37'; Van den Bergh 76'	Stadium: Jan Breydel Stadium; Attendance: 26,000; Referee: Lothar D'hondt

28 August 2021 6	Charleroi	5–2	Beerschot	Charleroi
16:15 CEST (UTC+2)				Stadium: Stade du Pays de Charleroi

13 September 2021 7	Beerschot	0–1	Sint-Truiden	Antwerp
20:00 CEST (UTC+2)				Stadium: Olympic Stadium

18 September 2021 8	Oostende	3–1	Beerschot	Ostend
16:15 CEST (UTC+2)				Stadium: Versluys Arena

25 September 2021 9	Beerschot	0–3	Eupen	Antwerp
16:15 CEST (UTC+2)				Stadium: Olympic Stadium

2 October 2021 10	Oud-Heverlee Leuven	0–0	Beerschot	Leuven
20:45 CEST (UTC+2)				Stadium: Den Dreef

17 October 2021 11	Beerschot	0–1	Mechelen	Antwerp
16:00 CEST (UTC+2)				Stadium: Olympic Stadium

24 October 2021 12	Anderlecht	4–2	Beerschot	Anderlecht
16:00 CEST (UTC+2)				Stadium: Constant Vanden Stock Stadium

30 October 2021 13	Beerschot	3–0	RFC Seraing	Antwerp
18:30 CEST (UTC+2)				Stadium: Olympic Stadium

6 November 2021 14	Kortrijk	1–1	Beerschot	Kortrijk
18:30 CET (UTC+1)				Stadium: Guldensporen Stadion

21 November 2021 15	Beerschot	2–0	Genk	Antwerp
21:00 CET (UTC+1)				Stadium: Olympic Stadium

28 November 2021 16	Zulte Waregem	2–0	Beerschot	Waregem
16:00 CET (UTC+1)				Stadium: Regenboogstadion

5 December 2021 17	Beerschot	0–1	Antwerp	Antwerp
13:30 CET (UTC+1)	Bourdin (yellow card) 26'; Dom (yellow card) 56'; Van den Bergh (yellow card) 90+3'; Pietermaat (yellow card) 90+6'; Holzhauser (yellow card) 90+6'	Report	Samatta (yellow card) 26'; Nainggolan 59'	Stadium: Olympisch Stadion; Attendance: 10,000; Referee: Lothar D'hondt

11 December 2021 18	Eupen	1–0	Beerschot	Eupen
18:30 CET (UTC+1)				Stadium: Kehrwegstadion

15 December 2021 19	Standard Liège	–	Beerschot	Liège
21:00 CET (UTC+1)				Stadium: Stade Maurice Dufrasne

18 December 2021 20	Beerschot	0–2	Oostende	Antwerp
16:15 CET (UTC+1)				Stadium: Olympic Stadium

27 December 2021 21	Beerschot	0–7	Anderlecht	Antwerp
21:00 CET (UTC+1)				Stadium: Olympic Stadium

16 January 2022 22	Genk	4–1	Beerschot	Genk
21:00 CET (UTC+1)				Stadium: Luminus Arena

22 January 2022 23	Beerschot	3–1	Oud-Heverlee Leuven	Antwerp
18:30 CET (UTC+1)				Stadium: Olympic Stadium

26 January 2022 24	RFC Seraing	2–1	Beerschot	Seraing
21:00 CET (UTC+1)				Stadium: Stade du Pairay

29 January 2022 25	Beerschot	3–3	Zulte Waregem	Antwerp
16:30 CET (UTC+1)				Stadium: Olympic Stadium

6 February 2022 26	Mechelen	3–2	Beerschot	Mechelen
16:00 CET (UTC+1)				Stadium: AFAS Stadion

13 February 2022 27	Beerschot	v	Kortrijk	Antwerp
21:00 CET (UTC+1)				Stadium: Olympic Stadium

19 February 2022 28	Cercle Brugge	v	Beerschot	Bruges
16:15 CET (UTC+1)				Stadium: Jan Breydel Stadium

25 February 2022 29	Beerschot	v	Charleroi	Antwerp
--:-- CET (UTC+1)				Stadium: Olympic Stadium

6 March 2022 30	Antwerp	v	Beerschot	Antwerp
--:-- CEST (UTC+2)				Stadium: Bosuilstadion

12 March 2022 31	Beerschot	v	Gent	Antwerp
--:-- CET (UTC+1)				Stadium: Olympic Stadium

19 March 2022 32	Sint-Truiden	v	Beerschot	Sint-Truiden
--:-- CET (UTC+1)				Stadium: Stayen

2 April 2022 33	Beerschot	v	Club Brugge	Antwerp
--:-- CEST (UTC+2)				Stadium: Olympic Stadium

9 April 2021 34	Union SG	v	Beerschot	Brussels
--:-- CEST (UTC+2)				Stadium: Stade Joseph Marien

=== Belgian Cup ===
27 October 2021 Round of 32	Francs Borains	0–4	Beerschot	Boussu
20:30 CET	Paul Niankou (yellow card) 26'; Lavenant (yellow card) 77'	Report	Noubissi 2'; Konstantopoulos (yellow card) 28'; Van den Bergh (yellow card) 42'; Caicedo (yellow card) 47' (goal) 60'; Holzhauser 78'; Halaïmia (yellow card) 84'; Vaca 90+3'	Stadium: Stade Robert Urbain; Referee: (Belgium) Jordy Vermeire

2 December 2021 Round of 16	Standard Liège	2–0 (a.e.t.)	Beerschot	Liège
20:45 CET	Sissako (yellow card) 21'; Drăguș (yellow card) 25'; Dussenne (yellow card) 84'; Tapsoba (yellow card) 91'; Muleka 96'; Bokadi 119'	Report	Lemos (yellow card) 25'; Holzhauser (yellow card) 34'	Stadium: Stade Maurice Dufrasne; Referee: (Belgium) Kevin Van Damme
