= 2017–18 Belgian First Division B =

Second season of the Belgian First Division B

Belgian First Division B
- Season: 2017–18
- Champions: Cercle Brugge
- Promoted: Cercle Brugge
- Relegated: Lierse
- Top goalscorer: Yannick Aguemon, Esteban Casagolda and Florent Stevance (10 goals each)
- Biggest home win: OH Leuven vs Cercle Brugge, 7–1; KVC Westerlo vs Lierse SK, 6-0
- Biggest away win: Roeselare vs Beerschot Wilrijk, 0–4
- Highest scoring: OH Leuven vs Cercle Brugge, 7–1

The 2017–18 season of the Belgian First Division B began in August 2017 and ended in April 2018. It was the second season of the First Division B following a change in league format from the old Belgian Second Division. The fixtures were announced near the end of June 2017. Cercle Brugge won the title and promotion on 10 March 2018. Although Tubize lost the relegation play-offs and therefore would have been relegated, they were saved as Lierse went bankrupt.

== Team changes ==
=== In ===
- Westerlo were relegated from the 2016–17 Belgian First Division A after finishing in last place.
- Beerschot Wilrijk were promoted as 2016–17 Belgian First Amateur Division winners.

=== Out ===
- Antwerp won the promotion play-offs against Roeselare and was thus promoted.
- Lommel United was relegated after they finished last in the relegation play-offs.

== Team information ==
=== Stadiums and locations ===
Locations of the 2017–18 Belgian First Division B teams

Matricule	Club	City	First season of current spell at second level	Coming from	2016-17 result	Stadium	Capacity
155	FCO Beerschot Wilrijk	Antwerp	2017–18	Belgian First Amateur Division	1st (D3)	Olympic Stadium	12,771
12	Cercle Brugge K.S.V.	Bruges	2015–16	Belgian Pro League	7th (D2)	Jan Breydel Stadium	29,945
6142	Oud-Heverlee Leuven	Leuven	2016–17	Belgian Pro League	6th (D2)	Den Dreef	10,000
30	Lierse S.K.	Lier	2015–16	Belgian Pro League	1st (D2)	Herman Vanderpoortenstadion	14,538
2024	K.V.C. Westerlo	Westerlo	2017–18	Belgian First Division A	16th (D1A)	Het Kuipje	8,035
134	K.S.V. Roeselare	Roeselare	2010–11	Belgian Pro League	2nd (D2)	Schiervelde Stadion	9,075
5632	A.F.C. Tubize	Tubize	2009–10	Belgian Pro League	5th (D2)	Stade Leburton	9,000
10	R. Union Saint-Gilloise	Saint-Gilles, Brussels	2015–16	Belgian Third Division	4th (D2)	King Baudouin Stadium (Note: As part of the reform, the rules for obtaining a licence were changed, with clubs now required to have a stadium with a capacity of at least 8,000. As the Stade Joseph Marien has only a capacity of six thousand, Union will play one season in the King Baudouin Stadium while their home stadium is being expanded. This ruling was extended with one additional season as the Stade Joseph Marien was not fully refurbished yet at the start of the 2017–18 season and is now expected to be finalised by June 2018.)	50,122

=== Personnel and kits ===
Club	Manager	Captain	Kit Manufacturer	Sponsors
Beerschot Wilrijk	(Belgium) Marc Brys	(Belgium) Tom Pietermaat	Joma	DCA
Cercle Brugge	(Belgium) Franky Vercauteren	(Belgium) Benjamin Lambot	Acerbis	ADMB
OH Leuven	(England) Nigel Pearson	(Belgium) Dimitri Daeseleire	Vermarc	King Power
Lierse	(Belgium) David Colpaert	(Belgium) Frédéric Frans	Jako	Wadi Degla
Roeselare	(Spain) Jordi Condom	(France) Raphaël Lecomte	Joma	Euro Shop
Tubize	(France) Philippe Thys	(Belgium) Quentin Laurent	Kappa	No shirt sponsor
Union SG	(Belgium) Marc Grosjean	(Belgium) Charles Morren	Patrick	Culture et Formation
Westerlo	(Belgium) Bob Peeters	(Belgium) Benjamin De Ceulaer	Saller	Soudal

=== Managerial changes ===
Team	Outgoing manager	Manner of departure	Date of vacancy	Position	Replaced by	Date of appointment
Westerlo	(Belgium) Jacky Mathijssen	Mutual consent	21 June 2017	Pre-season	(Bosnia and Herzegovina) Vedran Pelić	21 June 2017
Roeselare	(France) Arnauld Mercier	Sacked	12 September 2017	5th	(Netherlands) Dennis van Wijk	28 September 2017
OH Leuven	(Netherlands) Dennis van Wijk	Replaced	22 September 2017	4th	(England) Nigel Pearson	22 September 2017
Lierse	(Belgium) Frederik Vanderbiest	Sacked	6 October 2017	7th	(Belgium) William Still	11 October 2017
Cercle Brugge	(Belgium) José Riga	Sacked	16 October 2017	3rd	(Belgium) Franky Vercauteren	16 October 2017
Tubize	(Senegal) Sadio Demba	Sacked	13 November 2017	Closing tournament: 6th Overall: 8th	(France) Philippe Thys	13 November 2017
Lierse	(Belgium) William Still	Did not possess correct UEFA diploma to remain manager	2 December 2017	Closing tournament: 1st Overall: 3rd	(Belgium) David Colpaert	2 December 2017
Westerlo	(Bosnia and Herzegovina) Vedran Pelić	Replaced	5 December 2017	Closing tournament: 8th Overall: 7th	(Belgium) Bob Peeters	5 December 2017
Roeselare	(Netherlands) Dennis van Wijk	Sacked	19 January 2018	Closing tournament: 7th Overall: 5th	(Spain) Jordi Condom	25 January 2018

== League table ==
=== Opening tournament ===
Pos	Team	Pld	W	D	L	GF	GA	GD	Pts	Qualification	B-W	OHL	CER	ROE	LIE	USG	WES	TUB
1	Beerschot Wilrijk	14	8	5	1	29	10	+19	29	Qualification to Promotion play-offs	—	2–2	0–3	5–0	4–0	3–0	2–2	1–0
2	OH Leuven	14	7	5	2	28	15	+13	26		1–1	—	7–1	2–0	2–2	1–0	2–1	2–0
3	Cercle Brugge	14	7	2	5	24	21	+3	23		0–1	0–3	—	1–1	2–0	2–0	3–1	4–0
4	Roeselare	14	6	3	5	15	25	−10	21		0–4	3–1	2–1	—	2–0	1–0	0–0	1–0
5	Lierse	14	4	5	5	19	26	−7	17		2–2	2–1	3–2	2–2	—	2–1	2–2	1–1
6	Union SG	14	4	2	8	16	18	−2	14		0–3	0–0	1–2	4–0	3–2	—	3–0	1–2
7	Westerlo	14	2	6	6	16	22	−6	12		0–0	2–2	1–2	4–0	0–1	0–3	—	1–1
8	Tubize	14	2	4	8	10	20	−10	10		0–1	1–2	1–1	1–3	2–0	0–0	1–2	—

Source: Belgian First Division B (in French and Dutch)
Rules for classification: 1) Points; 2) Matches won; 3) Goal difference; 4) Goals scored; 5) Away goals scored; 6) Away matches won; 7) Play-off.

=== Closing tournament ===
Pos	Team	Pld	W	D	L	GF	GA	GD	Pts	Qualification	CER	LIE	OHL	USG	B-W	WES	ROE	TUB
1	Cercle Brugge	14	7	6	1	26	13	+13	27	Qualification to Promotion play-offs	—	4–1	1–0	2–2	4–0	1–1	1–0	0–0
2	Lierse	14	7	1	6	16	21	−5	22		1–0	—	0–1	1–0	2–1	2–0	1–2	2–1
3	OH Leuven	14	5	6	3	15	12	+3	21		2–2	2–1	—	3–1	1–1	0–1	1–1	1–1
4	Union SG	14	4	6	4	16	15	+1	18		1–1	1–0	0–0	—	1–0	1–1	1–2	1–1
5	Beerschot Wilrijk	14	4	5	5	13	17	−4	17		2–3	1–1	1–2	2–1	—	0–0	1–0	1–0
6	Westerlo	14	3	6	5	15	13	+2	15		2–3	6–0	1–0	0–1	1–1	—	0–0	0–0
7	Roeselare	14	3	5	6	11	18	−7	14		0–3	1–2	1–1	1–4	0–0	2–1	—	1–2
8	Tubize	14	2	7	5	11	14	−3	13		1–1	1–2	0–1	1–1	1–2 (Note: The match between Tubize and Beerschot-Wilrijk of 10 December was cancelled as the pitch was not deemed suited for football following long periods of rain and some snow. The match was instead played on 10 January.)	2–1	0–0	—

Source: Belgian First Division B (in French and Dutch)
Rules for classification: 1) Points; 2) Matches won; 3) Goal difference; 4) Goals scored; 5) Away goals scored; 6) Away matches won; 7) Play-off.

=== Aggregate table ===
Pos	Team	Pld	W	D	L	GF	GA	GD	Pts	Qualification
1	Cercle Brugge	28	14	8	6	50	34	+16	50	Qualification to Promotion play-offs
2	OH Leuven	28	12	11	5	43	27	+16	47	Qualification to Europa League play-offs
3	Beerschot Wilrijk	28	12	10	6	42	27	+15	46	Qualification to Promotion play-offs
4	Lierse	28	11	6	11	35	47	−12	39	Qualification to Europa League play-offs
5	Roeselare	28	9	8	11	26	43	−17	35	Qualification to Relegation play-offs
6	Union SG	28	8	8	12	32	33	−1	32	Qualification to Relegation play-offs
7	Westerlo	28	5	12	11	31	35	−4	27	Qualification to Relegation play-offs
8	Tubize	28	4	11	13	21	34	−13	23	Qualification to Relegation play-offs

Source: Belgian First Division B (in French and Dutch)
Rules for classification: 1) Points; 2) Matches won; 3) Goal difference; 4) Goals scored; 5) Away goals scored; 6) Away matches won; 7) Play-off.

Notes

1. The team that promotes to the 2018–19 Belgian First Division A, either by winning the promotion playoff or by winning both the opening and the closing tournament, will not take part in the Europa League play-offs. The next team in the league will take its spot instead.
2. In case the team that wins the promotion playoff finishes in the bottom four, the 4th placed team will play the relegation playoff instead.

=== Promotion play-offs ===
The winners of the opening tournament and the closing tournament met in a two-legged match to determine the division champion, who promoted to the 2018–19 Belgian First Division A. The team finishing highest in the aggregate table was allowed to play the second leg at home. In case one team had won both the opening and the closing tournament, these matches would not have been played and that team would have been promoted automatically.

On 5 November 2017, Beerschot Wilrijk won the opening tournament and was therefore assured of playing at least the promotion play-offs. The closing tournament was won by Cercle Brugge on 17 February 2018, who played Beerschot Wilrijk for the title and promotion.

The first leg was a closed match with few chances, until Cercle Brugge goalkeeper Paul Nardi made an error in controlling the ball, allowing Euloge Placca Fessou one of the easiest goals of his career. Shortly after, Beerschot Wilrijk saw midfielder Alexander Maes sent off following a harsh tackle, resulting them in controlling the game without creating more chances. In the return match, Cercle Brugge scored twice early and looked on its way to promotion, only for Beerschot Wilrijk to come back to 2–1 just minutes before the end and gaining the advantage on away goals. In a dramatic finish, Cercle Brugge was awarded a last minute penalty kick, converted by Irvin Cardona to bring them back to the highest division where they last played during the 2014–15 season.

4 March 2018
16:00

Beerschot Wilrijk	1–0	Cercle Brugge
Placca Fessou 53'; Maes (red card) 62'	Report

Olympic Stadium, Antwerp
Attendance: 11,750
Referee: Jonathan Lardot

10 March 2018
20:00

Cercle Brugge	3–1	Beerschot Wilrijk
Mercier 31'; Crysan 36'; Cardona 90' (pen.)	Report	Van Hyfte 84'

Jan Breydel Stadium, Bruges
Referee: Alexandre Boucaut

Cercle Brugge won 3–2 on aggregate.

=== Relegation play-offs ===
The four bottom teams in the aggregate table will take part in the relegation play-offs in which they keep half of the points they collected during the overall regular season (rounded up). As a result, the teams started with the following points before the playoff: Roeselare 18 points, Union SG 16, Westerlo 14 and Tubize 12 points. The points of Roeselare, Westerlo and Tubize were rounded up, therefore in case of any ties on points at the end of the playoffs, their half point would be deducted. The team finishing in last position will relegate to the 2018–19 Belgian First Amateur Division.

Following a 0-1 loss at home to Union SG on 14 April 2018, Tubize was mathematically relegated as the deficit to Union SG became six points with only two matches to go, while Union SG would always be ranked above Tubize in case of ties as the points of Tubize were rounded up prior to the relegation play-offs. Tubize was however spared of relegation from the Belgian First Division B as Lierse did not obtain a Belgian professional football license after going bankrupt.

Pos	Team	Pld	W	D	L	GF	GA	GD	Pts	Qualification	ROE	WES	USG	TUB
1	Roeselare (O)	6	3	3	0	5	1	+4	30	Relegation play off winner	—	0–0	1–0	0–0
2	Westerlo	6	3	3	0	6	1	+5	26		0–0	—	1–0	1–1
3	Union SG	6	1	1	4	2	6	−4	20		0–1	0–2	—	1–1
4	Tubize (Note: Tubize would have been relegated after finishing last, however following the bankruptcy of Lierse, they remained in the First Division B.)	6	0	3	3	3	8	−5	15	Relegation to the 2018–19 Belgian First Amateur Division cancelled	1–3	0–2	0–1	—

Source: Belgian First Division B (in French and Dutch)
Rules for classification: 1) Points; 2) Points without (possible) half points added due to rounding; 3) Matches won; 4) Goal difference; 5) Goals scored; 6) Away goals scored; 7) Away matches won; 8) Play-off.
(O) Play-off winners

== Season statistics ==
=== Top scorers ===
As of 16 February 2018.

Rank	Player	Club	Goals
1	(France) Yannick Aguemon	OH Leuven	10
1	(Belgium) Esteban Casagolda	OH Leuven	10
1	(France) Florent Stevance	Tubize	10
4	(France) Xavier Mercier	Cercle Brugge	9
4	(Argentina) Hernán Losada	Beerschot Wilrijk	9
4	(Armenia) Ivan Yagan	Lierse	9
7	(Togo) Euloge Placca Fessou	Beerschot Wilrijk	8
8	(Belgium) Jens Naessens	Westerlo	7
8	(Belgium) Dylan De Belder	Cercle Brugge	7
10	(France) Irvin Cardona	Cercle Brugge	6
10	(Belgium) Mohamed Messoudi	Beerschot Wilrijk	6
10	(Belgium) Nikola Storm	OH Leuven	6
10	(France) Guévin Tormin	Cercle Brugge	6
10	(Belgium) Julien Vercauteren	Union SG	6

5 goals (5 players)

- (Austria) Erwin Hoffer (Beerschot Wilrijk)
- (Brazil) Crysan (Cercle Brugge)
- (France) Pierre Bourdin (Lierse)
- (Belgium) Mathieu Cornet (Roeselare)
- (Nigeria) Christian Osaguona (Westerlo)

4 goals (5 players)

- (Belgium) Guillaume François (Beerschot Wilrijk)
- (Belgium) Nico Binst (Lierse)
- (Egypt) Mohamed El Gabbas (Lierse)
- (Belgium) Augusto Da Silva (Union SG)
- (Belgium) Maxime Annys (Westerlo)

3 goals (14 players)

- (Belgium) Gianni Bruno (Cercle Brugge)
- (Belgium) Stephen Buyl (Cercle Brugge)
- (France) Jérémy Taravel (Cercle Brugge)
- (Brazil) Andrei Camargo (Lierse)
- (Luxembourg) Aurélien Joachim (Lierse)
- (Belgium) Mathieu Maertens (OH Leuven)
- (Belgium) Davy Brouwers (Roeselare)
- (France) Raphaël Lecomte (Roeselare)
- (Belgium) Thibaut Van Acker (Roeselare)
- (Rwanda) Salomon Nirisarike (Tubize)
- (Belgium) Roman Ferber (Union SG)
- (Belgium) Mathias Fixelles (Union SG)
- (Belgium) Benjamin De Ceulaer (Westerlo)
- (Belgium) Daan Heymans (Westerlo)

2 goals (19 players)

- (Belgium) Alexander Maes (Beerschot Wilrijk)
- (Democratic Republic of the Congo) Kule Mbombo (Beerschot Wilrijk)
- (Gabon) Lloyd Palun (Cercle Brugge)
- (Spain) Héctor Rodas (Cercle Brugge)
- (Belgium) Frédéric Frans (Lierse)
- (Belgium) Mégan Laurent (Lierse)
- (England) Elliott Moore (OH Leuven)
- (Belgium) Kenneth Schuermans (OH Leuven)
- (Belgium) Alessandro Cerigioni (Roeselare)
- (Belgium) Emile Samyn (Roeselare)
- (Bosnia and Herzegovina) Nermin Zolotić (Roeselare)
- (Belgium) Marco Weymans (Tubize)
- (Belgium) Christophe Bertjens (Union SG)
- (Belgium) Kenneth Houdret (Union SG)
- (Belgium) Gertjan Martens (Union SG)
- (Belgium) Pietro Perdichizzi (Union SG)
- (Cameroon) Serge Tabekou (Union SG)
- (Belgium) Wouter Corstjens (Westerlo)
- (Belgium) Lukas Van Eenoo (Westerlo)

1 goal (40 players)

- (Belgium) Jimmy De Jonghe (Beerschot Wilrijk)
- (Belgium) Joren Dom (Beerschot Wilrijk)
- (Ukraine) Denis Prychynenko (Beerschot Wilrijk)
- (Netherlands) Arjan Swinkels (Beerschot Wilrijk)
- (Belgium) Tom Van Hyfte (Beerschot Wilrijk)
- (France) Benjamin Delacourt (Cercle Brugge)
- (France) Jordy Gaspar (Cercle Brugge)
- (Belgium) Benjamin Lambot (Cercle Brugge)
- (Belgium) Wesley Vanbelle (Cercle Brugge)
- (France) Christophe Vincent (Cercle Brugge)
- (Belgium) Sabir Bougrine (Lierse)
- (France) Pierre Bourdin (Lierse)
- (Belgium) Othman Boussaid (Lierse)
- (Belgium) Brice Ntambwe (Lierse)
- (Belgium) Thomas Azevedo (OH Leuven)
- (Senegal) Simon Diedhiou (OH Leuven)
- (France) Julien Gorius (OH Leuven)
- (France) Samy Kehli (OH Leuven)
- (North Macedonia) Jovan Kostovski (OH Leuven)
- (Belgium) Jarno Libert (OH Leuven)
- (Belgium) Koen Persoons (OH Leuven)
- (Belgium) Derrick Tshimanga (OH Leuven)
- (Scotland) Tony Watt (OH Leuven)
- (Nigeria) Saviour Godwin (Roeselare)
- (Belgium) Grégory Grisez (Roeselare)
- (Republic of the Congo) Maël Lépicier (Roeselare)
- (Bosnia and Herzegovina) Marko Maletić (Roeselare)
- (Liechtenstein) Sandro Wieser (Roeselare)
- (South Korea) Ki-wook Hwang (Tubize)
- (France) Emeric Dudouit (Tubize)
- (Senegal) Mohamed Kané (Tubize)
- (France) Hugo Vidémont (Tubize)
- (Nigeria) Simon Zenke (Tubize)
- (Belgium) Kevin Kis (Union SG)
- (Democratic Republic of the Congo) Héritier Luvumbu (Union SG)
- (France) Thibault Peyre (Union SG)
- (Belgium) Maxime Biset (Westerlo)
- (Denmark) Daniel Christensen (Westerlo)
- (Senegal) Noël Soumah (Westerlo)
- (Belgium) Cédric Vangeel (Westerlo)

1 own goal (7 players)

- (Belgium) Jan Van den Bergh (Beerschot Wilrijk, scored for Cercle Brugge)
- (Ivory Coast) Isaac Koné (Cercle Brugge, scored for Beerschot Wilrijk)
- (Belgium) Dimitri Daeseleire (OH Leuven, scored for Westerlo)
- (Belgium) Nick Gillekens (OH Leuven, scored for Roeselare)
- (Belgium) Laurent Lemoine (Roeselare, scored for Union SG)
- (Senegal) Ibrahima Ba (Tubize, scored for OH Leuven)
- (Belgium) Gertjan Martens (Union SG, scored for Tubize)

== Number of teams by provinces ==
Number of teams	Province or region	Team(s)
3	Antwerp	Beerschot Wilrijk, Lierse and Westerlo
2	West Flanders	Cercle Brugge and Roeselare
1	Brussels	Union SG
1	Flemish Brabant	OH Leuven
1	Walloon Brabant	Tubize

== Attendances ==
#	Club	Average
1	Beerschot	7,173
2	Cercle	5,667
3	OHL	5,122
4	Lierse	4,751
5	Westerlo	3,829
6	RUSG	2,147
7	Roeselare	2,086
8	Tubize	1,284
