= 2019–20 Belgian First Division B =

2nd tier association football league season

Belgian First Division B
- Season: 2019–20
- Champions: Beerschot
- Promoted: Beerschot; OH Leuven
- Relegated: Lokeren (bankrupt); Roeselare (refused license); Virton (refused license)
- Top goalscorer: Thomas Henry

The 2019–20 season of the Belgian First Division B began in August 2019 and was scheduled to end in April 2020 but will eventually conclude on 2 August 2020 with the return leg of the promotion playoff.

Since mid-March all matches had been postponed due to the coronavirus pandemic, which was just a few days before the return leg of the promotion play-offs was to be played. A few weeks later, Lokeren was declared bankrupt and ceased to exist, while both Roeselare and Virton were refused a professional football license due to financial difficulties, meaning they were both relegated and no relegation play-offs were necessary. On 15 May 2020, the general meeting of the Belgian Pro League clubs decided to end the season, with the exception of the return leg of the promotion play-offs. OH Leuven and Beerschot were forced to find a date and location for the return leg to decide promotion, before the start of the 2020–21 season on 7 August 2020. In case both teams did not come to an agreement, or the COVID-19 pandemic prevented the match to be played in time, Westerlo will be promoted instead as team which scored the most points overall. As the Belgian health safety council has prohibited sports competitions until the end of July and public events until the end of August, the match was scheduled to be played behind closed doors in the first weekend of August, just a few days before the start of the next season. Just two days before the match was scheduled to take place, the decision was overturned and instead the Belgian First Division A was expanded to 18 teams, meaning both Beerschot and OH Leuven were promoted. The final was still played to determine the champion.

== Team changes ==
=== In ===
- Lokeren were relegated from the 2018–19 Belgian First Division A after finishing in last place. The club returns to the second level of Belgian football for the first time since 1996.
- Virton were promoted as 2018–19 Belgian First Amateur Division winners, returning to the second level for the first time since the 2015–16 season.

=== Out ===
- 2018–19 Belgian First Division B Mechelen were initially not promoted as they were found guilty of match-fixing as part of the 2017–19 Belgian football fraud scandal. The club however appealed the decision with the Belgian Arbitration Court for Sports which ruled that as part of the general rules set by the Royal Belgian Football Association that match-fixing in a prior season could not be punished by relegation in the current season and hence Mechelen could not be denied their promotion, whether they were guilty or not.
- Tubize after finishing in last place in the relegation playoffs.

== Format changes ==
While the regular season format remains unchanged, consisting of two separate round-robin tournaments, the end of season playoff system has been altered somewhat, specifically the Europa League playoffs will now be played by 16 instead of 12 teams, meaning that now the top six teams in the aggregate standings of the First Division B will take part in these playoffs, including the team which has gained promotion. Until the 2018–19 season, only the three highest finishers (not including the promoting team) would enter.

As a consequence, from this season on only two teams will not enter the Europa League playoffs, namely the bottom two teams in the aggregate standings. Instead of a relegation tournament with the bottom four teams as was previously the case, now only these two teams will play the relegation playoffs, in which both teams will meet up to five times in a row, in a system similar to the one used a few seasons ago in the 2014–15 Belgian Pro League, with the team which finished 7th during the regular season starting with a three-point bonus and hosting three of the five home matches. The team with the fewest points after five matches will be relegated to the 2020–21 Belgian First Amateur Division.

== Team information ==
=== Stadiums and locations ===
Locations of the 2019–20 Belgian First Division B teams

Matricule	Club	City	First season of current spell at second level	Coming from	2018-19 result	Stadium	Capacity
13	K Beerschot VA	Antwerp	2017–18	Belgian First Amateur Division	2nd (D1B)	Olympic Stadium	12,771
282	Lokeren	Lokeren	2019–20	Belgian First Division A	16th (D1A)	Daknamstadion	12,136
2554	Lommel SK	Lommel	2018–19	Belgian First Amateur Division	7th (D1B)	Soevereinstadion	8,000
18	Oud-Heverlee Leuven	Leuven	2016–17	Belgian Pro League	5th (D1B)	Den Dreef	10,000
134	K.S.V. Roeselare	Roeselare	2010–11	Belgian Pro League	6th (D1B)	Schiervelde Stadion	9,075
10	R. Union Saint-Gilloise	Saint-Gilles, Brussels	2015–16	Belgian Third Division	3rd (D1B)	Stade Joseph Marien	5,500
200	R.E. Virton	Virton	2019–20	Belgian First Amateur Division	1st (D1Am)	Stade Yvan Georges	4,015
2024	K.V.C. Westerlo	Westerlo	2017–18	Belgian First Division A	4th (D1B)	Het Kuipje	8,035

=== Personnel and kits ===
Club	Manager	Kit Manufacturer	Sponsors
Beerschot	(Belgium) Stijn Vreven (matchday 1 to 9) (Argentina) Hernán Losada (matchday 10 & onwards)	Joma	DCA
Lokeren	(Belgium) Glen De Boeck (matchday 1 to 15) (Belgium) Stijn Vreven (matchday 16 & onwards)	Beltona	QTeam
Lommel	(Iceland) Stefán Gíslason (matchday 1 to 10) (Belgium) Peter Maes (matchday 11 & onwards)	Legea	United Telecom
OH Leuven	(Belgium) Vincent Euvrard (regular season & promotion play-off, leg 1) (Belgium) Marc Brys (promotion play-off, leg 2)	Adidas	King Power
Roeselare	(Iceland) Arnar Grétarsson (matchday 1 to 16) (France) Christophe Gamel (matchday 17 & onwards)	Joma	Euro Shop
Union SG	(Spain) Thomas Christiansen	Joma	Culture et Formation
Virton	(Germany) Dino Toppmöller (matchday 1 to 17) (France) Christian Bracconi (matchday 18 & onwards)	Jako	Leopard Natural & Dovit
Westerlo	(Belgium) Bob Peeters	Saller	Soudal

=== Managerial changes ===
Team	Outgoing manager	Manner of departure	Date of vacancy	Position	Replaced by	Date of appointment
Roeselare	(Spain) Juanito	Contract not prolonged	End of 2018–19 season	Pre-season	(Iceland) Arnar Grétarsson	31 July 2019
Virton	(Belgium) Samuel Petit	Caretaker Replaced	End of 2018–19 season	Pre-season	(Germany) Dino Toppmöller	31 May 2019
Lommel	(Belgium) Tom Van Imschoot	Became assistant at Genk	18 June 2019	Pre-season	(Iceland) Stefán Gíslason	27 June 2019
Union SG	(Slovenia) Luka Elsner	Became manager at Amiens	19 June 2019	Pre-season	(Spain) Thomas Christiansen	1 July 2019
Beerschot	(Belgium) Stijn Vreven	Sacked	9 October 2019	5th	(Argentina) Hernán Losada	9 October 2019
Lommel	(Iceland) Stefán Gíslason	Replaced	17 October 2019	7th	(Belgium) Peter Maes	17 October 2019
Lokeren	(Belgium) Glen De Boeck	Sacked	17 November 2019	Closing tournament: 7th Overall: 7th	(Belgium) Stijn Vreven	19 November 2019
Roeselare	(Iceland) Arnar Grétarsson	Sacked	27 November 2019	Closing tournament: 7th Overall: 8th	(France) Christophe Gamel (caretaker)	27 November 2019
Virton	(Germany) Dino Toppmöller	Resigned	2 December 2019	Closing tournament: 7th Overall: 3rd	(France) Christian Bracconi	4 December 2019
OH Leuven	(Belgium) Vincent Euvrard	Sacked	9 June 2020	Promotion play-offs, lost first leg 1-0	(Belgium) Marc Brys	16 June 2020

== League table ==
=== Opening tournament ===
Pos	Team	Pld	W	D	L	GF	GA	GD	Pts	Qualification	OHL	VIR	WES	USG	BEE	LOK	ROE	LOM
1	OH Leuven	14	9	2	3	22	10	+12	29	Qualification to promotion play-offs	—	1–0	2–1	0–0 (Note: On 1 November 2019 the match between OH Leuven and Union SG was stopped during the second half at a 0–0 scoreline, when part of the floodlights in the stadium stopped working. The lights had been malfunctioning several times throughout the match and when the total time of delay exceeded 30 minutes the referee had to stop the match as per the rules of the Belgian FA. After investigations, the commission of the Belgian FA ruled on 2 January 2020 that OHL was to lose the match by a forfeit score of 0–5. OH Leuven appealed the decision at the Belgian court for sports arbitrage (BAS) which ruled on 31 January 2020 that the match needed to be replayed in full as the club could not be deemed accountable for the floodlight failure and the referee had insufficiently motivated his decision to stop the match. The match was replayed on 11 February 2020.)	3–0	2–3	4–0	1–0
2	Virton	14	9	0	5	26	10	+16	27		0–1	—	1–0	0–1	3–0	4–0	3–2	1–0
3	Westerlo	14	8	2	4	21	10	+11	26		1–0	0–1	—	1–2	2–0	2–0	4–1	1–1
4	Union SG	14	6	5	3	18	15	+3	23		1–1	2–1	0–2	—	1–1	3–1	3–0	2–1
5	Beerschot	14	5	2	7	13	19	−6	17		1–2	2–1	1–2	1–0	—	1–0	2–1	2–0
6	Lokeren	14	3	4	7	13	23	−10	13		0–2	1–3	1–1	1–1	2–1	—	2–0	0–0
7	Roeselare	14	3	2	9	15	31	−16	11		3–1	0–5 (Note: On 10 September 2019, Roeselare was declared bankrupt by the West-Flemish corporation court for unpaid outstanding debt, thereby losing control to a curator who prohibited the players from training or playing a match. The management of Roeselare appealed the decision, but as the ruling was scheduled to occur after the match against Virton they were not able to play the match. The league's calendar manager and Pro League management have suggested three possible dates to Virton on which to reschedule the match, but as Virton found these to be insuitable due to unavailability of their manager, the Pro League ruled on 13 September 2019 that Roeselare would lose the match with a forfeit score of 0-5. A few days later, the declaration of bankruptcy was uplifted and Roeselare could again take part in the competition.)	0–2	3–0	1–1	2–1	—	1–1
8	Lommel	14	2	5	7	9	19	−10	11		0–2	0–3	0–2	2–2	1–0	1–1	2–1	—

Source: Belgian First Division B (in French and Dutch)
Rules for classification: 1) Points; 2) Matches won; 3) Goal difference; 4) Goals scored; 5) Away goals scored; 6) Away matches won; 7) Play-off.

=== Closing tournament ===
Pos	Team	Pld	W	D	L	GF	GA	GD	Pts	Qualification	BEE	WES	USG	VIR	OHL	LOM	ROE	LOK
1	Beerschot (C)	14	7	5	2	18	13	+5	26	Qualification to promotion play-offs	—	1–0	1–1	1–1	2–1	2–1	1–1	1–1
2	Westerlo	14	7	2	5	24	20	+4	23		0–1	—	0–3	2–1	1–2	2–1	1–1	3–2 (Note: In preparation for the oncoming storm Ciara, all matches of Sunday 9 February 2020 in the 2019–20 Belgian First Division A and 2019–20 Belgian First Division B were postponed, but were all completed just a few days later.)
3	Union SG	14	5	7	2	25	17	+8	22		0–2	3–1	—	2–0	2–3	2–2	3–3	1–1
4	Virton	14	5	5	4	18	16	+2	20		~~1–0~~ (Note: On 25 January 2020 the match between Virton and Beerschot ended in 1–0, with the only goal of the match the result of a quickly taken free kick which occurred while the referee was giving instructions to the Beerschot players and was facing away from the ball. Beerschot appealed the result, citing an erroneous decision by the referee. The referee department admitted the error but cited the rules of the game were implicitly followed, however the arbitration committee eventually demanded the match to be replayed, rescheduling it to 2 March 2020. A few hours after the news had spread that the match would need to be replayed, Virton announced they, in turn, would appeal the annulment. Westerlo joined the appeal a few hours later, citing unfairness as the match would be replayed after all other matches had been played, giving Beerschot an unfair advantage. Ultimately the replay was scheduled for 26 July but the match did not take place. Both teams were then sanction with forfait loss by the Belgian FA.)	1–1	0–0	—	4–1	3–1	1–1	1–2
5	OH Leuven	14	5	2	7	23	30	−7	17		0–3	1–3	3–5	0–2	—	3–0	2–1	2–1
6	Lommel	14	4	4	6	12	18	−6	16		1–0	0–1	0–0	0–0	3–2	—	0–0	1–0
7	Roeselare	14	2	9	3	22	23	−1	15		1–1	3–5	1–1	0–2	2–2	3–1	—	2–2
8	Lokeren	14	1	4	9	11	26	−15	7		0–2	0–4	0–2	0–2	1–1	0–1	1–3	—

Source: Belgian First Division B (in French and Dutch)
Rules for classification: 1) Points; 2) Matches won; 3) Goal difference; 4) Goals scored; 5) Away goals scored; 6) Away matches won; 7) Play-off.
(C) Champions

=== Aggregate table ===
Pos	Team	Pld	W	D	L	GF	GA	GD	Pts	Qualification
1	Westerlo	28	15	4	9	45	30	+15	49	
2	Virton (Note: On 12 May 2020, Virton were refused both a professional football license and a remunerated football license, meaning they were relegated two levels, to the 2020–21 Belgian Second Amateur Division.) (R)	28	14	5	9	44	26	+18	47	Relegation to 2020–21 Belgian Second Amateur Division
3	OH Leuven (Q)	28	14	4	10	45	40	+5	46	Qualification to Promotion play-offs
4	Union SG	28	11	12	5	43	32	+11	45	
5	Beerschot (Q)	28	12	7	9	31	32	−1	43	Qualification to Promotion play-offs
6	Lommel	28	6	9	13	21	37	−16	27	
7	Roeselare (Note: On 11 May 2020, Roeselare were refused a professional football license, meaning they were relegated to the 2020–21 Belgian First Amateur Division.) (R)	28	5	11	12	37	54	−17	26	Relegation to 2020–21 Belgian First Amateur Division
8	Lokeren (Note: Lokeren went bankrupt and ceased to exist.) (R)	28	4	8	16	24	49	−25	20	Folded as a team following bankruptcy

Source: Belgian First Division B (in French and Dutch)
Rules for classification: 1) Points; 2) Matches won; 3) Goal difference; 4) Goals scored; 5) Away goals scored; 6) Away matches won; 7) Play-off.
(Q) Qualified for the phase indicated; (R) Relegated

== Promotion play-offs ==
The winners of the opening tournament and the closing tournament compete in a two-legged match to determine the division champion, who will be promoted to the 2020–21 Belgian First Division A. The team finishing highest in the aggregate table will host the return leg. In case a single team wins both the opening and the closing tournament, that team will be promoted automatically and no play-offs will be organized.

On 8 November 2019, OH Leuven assured itself of winning the opening tournament following an away win at Virton. As such OH Leuven was certain of playing at least the promotion play-offs at the end of the season. On 21 February, following a loss against Union SG, OH Leuven could no longer win the closing tournament, meaning that promotion play-offs will be necessary to determine the overall champion. One week later, Beerschot won the second period, becoming the opponent of OH Leuven in the promotion play-offs.

After the first leg was played, the second leg was postponed due to the COVID-19 pandemic. Mid-May, the Belgian association of professional football clubs decided that the second leg should take place behind closed doors in the first weekend of August to determine the champion and promoting team, on 2 August 2020. In case the final match could not be played, Westerlo would be promoted as the team with the most points in the aggregate table. However, on 31 July 2020, just two days before the actual final match, the decision was overturned and instead the 2020–21 Belgian First Division A would be expanded to 18 (from 16) teams, meaning both OH Leuven and Beerschot would be promoted. It was decided the promotional final would still be played to determine the champion of the 2019–20 Belgian First Division B.

=== Summary ===
Team 1	Agg.	Team 2	1st leg	2nd leg
Beerschot	5–1	OH Leuven	1–0	4–1

==== First leg ====
The first match saw Beerschot starting strong, with Kenneth Schuermans nearly deflecting a free-kick by Raphael Holzhauser into his own goal in just the first minute. OH Leuven replied with a long ball to Mathieu Maertens who saw the ball tackled away from him in last instance by Joren Dom, else he would have had a free run on goal. With 20 minutes played, Frédéric Frans also almost scored an own goal, after deflecting a free kick against the cross bar with Mike Vanhamel beaten, but a few seconds later on the other end it was his teammate Tarik Tissoudali opening the score for Beerschot, after first holding off former Beerschot player Jan Van den Bergh and then slotting in the ball past Laurent Henkinet. From that moment, Beerschot took over, forcing Henkinet to several saves, twice through a Joren Dom header, once after a shot by Marius Noubissi.

At the start of the second half, Vincent Euvrard brought on offensive winger Yannick Aguemon with the hope of creating more chances, but it was Beerschot who nearly scored immediately after the break, with Frans getting a free header after a Tissoudali run, but being unable to reach the ball completely, harmlessly sending it over the bar. From that moment, OH Leuven got more and more into the match, but both Kamal Sowah and Thomas Henry forgot to send a pass to Jérémy Perbet, who twice ran well to find the open space but did not get the ball. Beerschot suddenly scored a second goal, again through Tissoudali, but saw it disallowed by the VAR for offside. OH Leuven kept pushing for an away goal, but both Maertens (not enough power behind the shot) and Aguemon (shot wide) failed their attempts. Ten minutes before time, Henry got the best chance for OH Leuven, but his close-range header was miraculously saved by Vanhamel with an instinctive reflex.

==== Second leg ====
In an empty stadium in Leuven, and no longer with the promotion at stake as both clubs were now certain of being promoted, Beerschot took the initiative in the first minutes of the second leg, with minor attempts by Tissoudali and Noubissi before OH Leuven took control. Both Maertens and Henru had efforts on goal which were saved by Vanhamel, while Sowah aimed a long-range strike against the bottom of the crossbar with Vanhamel beaten, but just inches too high for the opening goal. Beerschot was suffering, but took the lead out of the blue just before half time, as a sharp corner kick by Holzhauser resulted in an own-goal following a deflection by Schuermans, the scoreline not reflecting the flow of play going into the break. OH Leuven now needed three goals, but was not as efficient as Beerschot, as early in the second half Frédéric Duplus fumbled and allowed Tissoudali to easily tap in the second goal. Ten minutes later Noubissi scored the third from a sharp angle. In the final minutes, Perbet scored the consolation goal for the home team through a header, while Euloge Placca Fessou set the final score at 1–4. Beerschot thus won the tie by an aggregate score of 5–1, becoming 2019–20 Belgian First Division B champions, while OH Leuven was promoted as well.

=== Matches ===
8 March 2020
16:00

Beerschot	1–0	OH Leuven
Tissoudali 22'	report

Olympic Stadium, Antwerp
Attendance: 11,452
Referee: Alexandre Boucaut
2 August 2020
19:00

OH Leuven	1–4	Beerschot
Perbet 79'	report	Schuermans 43' (o.g.); Tissoudali 52'; Noubissi 62'; Placca 90+4'

Den Dreef, Heverlee
Attendance: 0
Referee: Lawrence Visser

== Play-offs III ==
The relegation playoffs, more commonly known as playoffs 3, were scheduled to be played by the two bottom teams in the overall season standings. These two teams would play a separate competition, playing each other five times between 20 March and 26 April, with the team which finished higher during the regular season starting with three bonus points and home advantage in the first match.

On 16 February 2020, following a 0–2 loss against Virton, Lokeren could no longer avoid these playoffs. One week later, following a draw away to Roeselare, Lokeren was also sure of finishing last and thus would start with a three-point deficit. On the final matchday on 28 February 2020, Roeselare only drew away to Lommel, meaning they would have become the opponents of Lokeren in Play-offs III.

Initially, these playoffs were postponed due to the coronavirus pandemic, but in the end, they were canceled as on 20 April 2020 Lokeren was declared bankrupt and ceased to exist. Following a merge with KSV Temse a new club was created, Lokeren-Temse, starting at the fourth level (Belgian Second Amateur Division). As such, Roeselare would have been saved, but three weeks later on 11 May 2020 they were refused a professional football license, meaning they were still relegated to the 2020–21 Belgian First Amateur Division.

== Season statistics ==
=== Top scorers ===
As of 28 February 2020

Rank	Player	Club	Goals
1	(France) Thomas Henry	OH Leuven	15
2	(South Africa) Kurt Abrahams	Westerlo	10
2	(Belgium) Christian Brüls	Westerlo	10
4	(Belgium) Mathieu Maertens	OH Leuven	8
4	(Cameroon) Serge Tabekou	Union SG	8
6	(Austria) Raphael Holzhauser	Beerschot	7
6	(Denmark) Casper Nielsen	Union SG	7
6	(Nigeria) Saviour Godwin	Roeselare	7
6	(Angola) Stélvio	Virton	7
10	(Georgia (country)) Giorgi Beridze	Lokeren	6
10	(France) Clément Couturier	Virton	6
10	(Belgium) Jonathan Hendrickx	Lommel	6
10	(France) Amir Nouri	Roeselare	6

5 goals (4 players)
- (France) Jérémy Perbet (OH Leuven)
- (France) Teddy Teuma (Union SG)
- (France) Loïc Lapoussin (Virton)
- (Belgium) Gilles Dewaele (Westerlo)
4 goals (8 players)
- (Cameroon) Marius Noubissi (Beerschot)
- (Republic of the Congo) Yhoan Andzouana (Roeselare)
- (Brazil) Andrei Camargo (Roeselare)
- (Belgium) Jens Naessens (Roeselare)
- (Belgium) Mathias Fixelles (Union SG)
- (Luxembourg) Aurélien Joachim (Virton)
- (Ivory Coast) Ambroise Gboho (Westerlo)
- (Angola) Igor Vetokele (Westerlo)
3 goals (15 players)
- (Belgium) Loris Brogno (Beerschot)
- (Morocco) Tarik Tissoudali (Beerschot)
- (Japan) Jun Amano (Lokeren)
- (Belgium) Amine Benchaib (Lokeren)
- (Belgium) Jamal Aabbou (Lommel)
- (France) Xavier Mercier (OH Leuven)
- (Ghana) Kamal Sowah (OH Leuven)
- (Belgium) Tom Van Hyfte (OH Leuven)
- (Brazil) Rodrigo Bassani (Roeselare)
- (Norway) Sigurd Hauso Haugen (Union SG)
- (Iceland) Aron Sigurðarson (Union SG)
- (France) Franck Koré (Virton)
- (Brazil) Lucas Ribeiro Costa (Virton)
- (Luxembourg) David Turpel (Virton)
- (Belgium) Lukas Van Eenoo (Westerlo)
2 goals (19 players)
- (Belgium) Joren Dom (Beerschot)
- (Belgium) Frédéric Frans (Beerschot)
- (Togo) Euloge Placca Fessou (Beerschot)
- (Republic of the Congo) Dylan Saint-Louis (Beerschot)
- (Bosnia and Herzegovina) Anel Hajrić (Lokeren)
- (Japan) Ryuta Koike (Lokeren)
- (Belgium) Sebastiaan Brebels (Lommel)
- (The Gambia) Abdoulie Sanyang (Lommel)
- (Belgium) Yanis Mbombo (OH Leuven)
- (Belgium) Jan Van den Bergh (OH Leuven)
- (Belgium) Esteban Casagolda (Roeselare)
- (Belgium) Siemen Voet (Roeselare)
- (Belgium) Ibrahima Bah (Union SG)
- (Belgium) Roman Ferber (Union SG)
- (France) Ismaël Kandouss (Union SG)
- (Belgium) Pietro Perdichizzi (Union SG)
- (Comoros) Faïz Selemani (Union SG)
- (Argentina) Federico Vega (Union SG)
- (Bulgaria) Edisson Jordanov (Virton)
- (Belgium) Mohamed Soumaré (Virton)
- (Belgium) Maxime Biset (Westerlo)
1 goal (32 players)
- (France) Pierre Bourdin (Beerschot)
- (Belgium) Brian De Keersmaecker (Beerschot)
- (Algeria) Réda Halaïmia (Beerschot)
- (Belgium) Alexander Maes (Beerschot)
- (Belgium) Jorn Vancamp (Beerschot)
- (Kazakhstan) Yan Vorogovskiy (Beerschot)
- (Mali) Abdoulaye Diaby (Lokeren)
- (Belgium) Dylan Mbayo (Lokeren)
- (Spain) Fran Navarro (Lokeren)
- (Belgium) Mickaël Tirpan (Lokeren)
- (Belgium) Jelle Van Damme (Lokeren)
- (Belgium) Gil Van Moerzeke (Lokeren)
- (Belgium) Robin Henkens (Lommel)
- (Slovenia) Mitja Križan (Lommel)
- (Belgium) Arne Naudts (Lommel)
- (Belgium) Ben Santermans (Lommel)
- (Iceland) Kolbeinn Þórðarson (Lommel)
- (Georgia (country)) Beka Vachiberadze (Lommel)
- (Benin) Yannick Aguemon (OH Leuven)
- (Germany) Sascha Kotysch (OH Leuven)
- (Belgium) Kenneth Schuermans (OH Leuven)
- (Belgium) Derrick Tshimanga (OH Leuven)
- (Belgium) Wesley Vanbelle (Roeselare)
- (Belgium) Jonathan Vervoort (Roeselare)
- (Belgium) Glenn Claes (Virton)
- (Morocco) Samir Hadji (Virton)
- (Luxembourg) Kevin Malget (Virton)
- (France) Fabien Antunes (Westerlo)
- (Belgium) Stephen Buyl (Westerlo)
- (Belgium) Christophe Janssens (Westerlo)
- (Serbia) Sava Petrov (Westerlo)
- (Senegal) Noël Soumah (Westerlo)
1 own goal (5 players)
- (Belgium) Jelle Van Damme (Lokeren, scored for Virton)
- (Belgium) Siemen Voet (Roeselare, scored for Lommel)
- (Belgium) Pietro Perdichizzi (Union SG, scored for Lommel)
- (Argentina) Federico Vega (Union SG, scored for Westerlo)
- (Belgium) Maxime Biset (Westerlo, scored for Lokeren)

=== Team of the season ===
Upon completion of the regular season a team of the season award was compiled, based upon the results of the team of the week results throughout the season, constructed based on nominations from managers, assistant-managers, journalists and analysts. The results were announced from 23 March 2020, with one player revealed each day.

Pos		Player	Club	Ref
GK	(Luxembourg)	Anthony Moris	Virton	
RB	(Argentina)	Federico Vega	Union SG	
CB	(Belgium)	Glenn Neven	Lommel	
CB	(Belgium)	Kenneth Schuermans	OH Leuven	
LB	(Belgium)	Derrick Tshimanga	OH Leuven	
MF	(Belgium)	Christian Brüls	Westerlo	
MF	(Austria)	Raphael Holzhauser	Beerschot	
MF	(Denmark)	Casper Nielsen	Union SG	
LW	(South Africa)	Kurt Abrahams	Westerlo	
RW	(Cameroon)	Serge Tabekou	Union SG	
FW	(France)	Thomas Henry	OH Leuven	

== Number of teams by provinces ==
Teams	Province or region	Team(s)
2	Antwerp	Beerschot and Westerlo
1	Brussels	Union SG
1	East Flanders	Lokeren
1	Flemish Brabant	OH Leuven
1	Limburg	Lommel
1	Luxembourg	Virton
1	West Flanders	Roeselare
