= 2022–23 K Beerschot VA season =

K Beerschot VA
2022–23 season
- Owner: Abdullah bin Musaid Al Saud
- Chairman: Francis Vrancken
- Manager: Andreas Wieland
- Stadium: Olympisch Stadion
- Challenger Pro League: 3rd
- Belgian Cup: Sixth round
- Top goalscorer: League: Thibo Baeten (13); All: Thibo Baeten (14)

The 2022–23 season was K Beerschot VA's 10th season in the existence and the club's first season back in the Challenger Pro League. The club participated also in the Belgian Cup. The season spans a period between 1 July 2022 and 30 June 2023.

== First-team squad ==
As of 20 March 2023

Note: Flags indicate national team as defined under FIFA eligibility rules; some limited exceptions apply. Players may hold more than one non-FIFA nationality.

No.	Pos.	Nation	Player
1	GK	BEL	Bill Lathouwers
2	DF	BEL	Jan Van den Bergh
3	DF	BEL	Hervé Matthys
4	DF	BEL	Frédéric Frans
5	DF	BEL	Robbe Quirynen
6	DF	AUT	Luca Meisl
7	FW	BEL	Thibo Baeten (on loan from NEC Nijmegen)
8	MF	NGR	Ibrahim Alhassan
9	FW	LBR	Ayouba Kosiah
10	FW	BEL	Thibaud Verlinden
11	FW	SUI	Henri Koide
16	DF	SUI	Léo Seydoux (on loan from Westerlo)
17	FW	ISL	Nökkvi Thórisson

No.	Pos.	Nation	Player
18	MF	BEL	Ryan Sanusi
21	MF	GHA	Abraham Okyere
22	MF	BEL	Andi Koshi
24	DF	BEL	Mardochee Nzita
28	DF	BDI	Marco Weymans
31	GK	BEL	Mike Vanhamel
35	MF	BEL	Dante Rigo
40	FW	MAR	Ilias Sebaoui
47	DF	FRA	Nicksoen Gomis (on loan from Sheffield United)
52	MF	BEL	Axl Van Himbeeck
66	DF	GRE	Apostolos Konstantopoulos
71	GK	CRO	Davor Matijaš
—	GK	BEL	Ilias Moutha-Sebtaoui

=== Out on loan ===
Note: Flags indicate national team as defined under FIFA eligibility rules; some limited exceptions apply. Players may hold more than one non-FIFA nationality.

No.	Pos.	Nation	Player
—	FW	SEN	Issa Soumaré (on loan at Quevilly-Rouen)

== Pre-season and friendlies ==
Win Draw Loss Fixtures

16 July 2022 Friendly	Westerlo	2–3	Beerschot	Geel
11:00 CEST (UTC+2)				Stadium: Trainingscomplex KVC Westerlo

23 July 2022 Friendly	Beerschot	1–0	Sparta Rotterdam	Garderen
15:00 CEST (UTC+2)				Stadium: Sportpark De Westeneng

30 July 2022 Friendly	Beerschot	2–2 (4–2 p)	FC Eindhoven	Antwerp
16:00 CEST (UTC+2)				Stadium: Olympisch Stadion

== Competitions ==
=== Overall record ===
Competition	First match	Last match	Starting round	Final position	Record							
Competition	First match	Last match	Starting round	Final position	Pld	W	D	L	GF	GA	GD	Win %
Challenger Pro League	13 August 2022	12 February 2023	Matchday 1	3rd	22	12	2	8	33	28	+5	54.55
Challenger Pro League play-offs	26 February 2023	13 May 2023	Matchday 1		9	3	2	4	8	11	−3	33.33
Belgian Cup	25 September 2022	9 November 2022	Fifth round	Sixth round	2	1	0	1	5	3	+2	50.00
Total					33	16	4	13	46	42	+4	48.48

Last updated: 5 May 2023
Source: Soccerway

=== Challenger Pro League ===
==== League table ====
Pos	Team	Pld	W	D	L	GF	GA	GD	Pts	Qualification
1	RWD Molenbeek (C, P)	32	21	6	5	65	29	+36	69	Promoted to Pro League
2	Beveren	32	20	8	4	75	33	+42	68	
3	Beerschot	32	15	4	13	43	41	+2	49	
4	Club NXT (Note: ineligible for promotion.)	32	14	7	11	51	48	+3	49	
5	Lierse Kempenzonen	32	14	4	14	53	59	−6	46	

Source: Challenger Pro League
Rules for classification: 1) Points; 2) Matches won; 3) Goal difference; 4) Goals scored; 5) Away goals scored; 6) Away matches won; 7) Play-off.
(C) Champions; (P) Promoted

==== Results summary ====
Overall								Home						Away					
Pld	W	D	L	GF	GA	GD	Pts	W	D	L	GF	GA	GD	W	D	L	GF	GA	GD
22	12	2	8	33	28	+5	38	6	1	4	15	11	+4	6	1	4	18	17	+1

Last updated: complete.

==== Results by round ====
Round	1	2	3	4	5	6	7	8	9	10	11	12	13	14	15	16	17	18	19	20	21	22
Ground	H	A	H	A	H	A	H	A	H	A	H	A	H	H	A	A	H	A	A	H	A	H
Result	W	D	L	W	L	W	W	L	D	W	L	W	W	W	W	W	W	L	L	W	L	L
Position	3	2	6	2	5	2	1	4	5	4	5	5	3	3	1	1	1	1	3	3	3	3

A = Away; H = Home; W = Win; D = Draw; L = Loss

==== Matches ====
13 August 2022 1	Beerschot	1–0	Beveren	Antwerp
CEST (UTC+2)				Stadium: Olympisch Stadion

19 August 2022 2	SL16 FC	2–2	Beerschot	Liège
CEST (UTC+2)

28 August 2022 3	Beerschot	2–3	Lierse Kempenzonen	Antwerp
CEST (UTC+2)				Stadium: Olympisch Stadion

3 September 2022 4	Club NXT	1–2	Beerschot	Bruges
CEST (UTC+2)

9 September 2022 5	Beerschot	0–2	Lommel	Antwerp
CEST (UTC+2)				Stadium: Olympisch Stadion

18 September 2022 6	Virton	1–2	Beerschot	Virton
CEST (UTC+2)

1 October 2022 7	Beerschot	2–0	Deinze	Antwerp
CEST (UTC+2)				Stadium: Olympisch Stadion

8 October 2022 8	RWDM	2–0	Beerschot	Molenbeek
CEST (UTC+2)

16 October 2022 9	Beerschot	1–1	Dender EH	Antwerp
CEST (UTC+2)				Stadium: Olympisch Stadion

22 October 2022 10	Jong Genk	1–2	Beerschot	Genk
CEST (UTC+2)

29 October 2022 11	Beerschot	1–2	RSCA Futures	Antwerp
CEST (UTC+2)				Stadium: Olympisch Stadion

6 November 2022 12	Lommel	1–3	Beerschot	Lommel
CET (UTC+1)

12 November 2022 13	Beerschot	3–0	Virton	Antwerp
CET (UTC+1)				Stadium: Olympisch Stadion

19 November 2022 14	Beerschot	1–0	Club NXT	Antwerp
CET (UTC+1)				Stadium: Olympisch Stadion

26 November 2022 15	RSCA Futures	1–2	Beerschot	Anderlecht
CET (UTC+1)

3 December 2022 16	Dender EH	2–3	Beerschot	Dender
CET (UTC+1)

11 December 2022 17	Beerschot	1–0	SL16 FC	Antwerp
CET (UTC+1)				Stadium: Olympisch Stadion

15 January 2023 18	Deinze	3–2	Beerschot	Deinze
CET (UTC+1)

22 January 2023 19	Beveren	2–0	Beerschot	Beveren
CET (UTC+1)

27 January 2023 20	Beerschot	3–2	Jong Genk	Antwerp
20:00 CET (UTC+1)	Sebaoui 45+2'; Van Himbeeck 87'; Sanusi 90+6'		Cutillas-Carpe 12'; Didden 25'	Stadium: Olympisch Stadion; Referee: Michiel Allaerts

4 February 2023 21	Lierse Kempenzonen	1–0	Beerschot	Lier
20:00 CET (UTC+1)	Tabekou 42'			Stadium: Herman Vanderpoortenstadion; Referee: Alexandre Boucaut

12 February 2023 22	Beerschot	0–1	RWDM	Antwerp
19:15 CET (UTC+1)			Biron 61' (pen.)	Stadium: Olympisch Stadion; Referee: Brent Staessens

=== Belgian Cup ===
25 September 2022 Fifth round	Knokke	0–4	Beerschot	Knokke
16:00 CET (UTC+1)	Vanraefelghem (yellow card) 31'; Ghesquière (yellow card) 42'	Report	Baeten 8'; Van den Bergh (yellow card) 45'; Sanusi 49'; Þórisson 54'; Nzita (yellow card) 85' (yellow-red card) 90', (goal) 74'	Stadium: Stadion Olivier; Referee: Jari Van Laere

9 November 2022 Sixth round	Cercle Brugge	3–1	Beerschot	Bruges
20:00 CET (UTC+1)	Francis (yellow card) 18'; Popović (yellow card) 25'; Denkey 4', 51'; Ueda 48'	Report	Verlinden (yellow card) 40', (goal) 44'; Alhassan (yellow card) 81'	Stadium: Jan Breydel Stadium; Referee: Matonga Simonini
