= Ramiro Vaca =

Bolivian footballer (born 1999)

Personal information
- Full name: Ramiro Vaca Ponce
- Date of birth: 1 July 1999 (age 27)
- Place of birth: Tarija, Bolivia
- Height: 1.77 m (5 ft 10 in)
- Position: Midfielder

Team information
- Current team: Khor Fakkan (on loan from Wydad AC)

Senior career*
Years	Team	Apps	(Gls)
2016–2017	Club Quebracho		
2018–2021	The Strongest	75	(10)
2021–2022	Beerschot	40	(0)
2023–2026	Bolívar	74	(18)
2026–	Wydad AC	18	(4)
2026–	→ Khor Fakkan (loan)	0	(0)

International career^{‡}
2017–2019	Bolivia U20	10	(2)
2017–	Bolivia	49	(5)
- * Club domestic league appearances and goals as of 19:13, 6 July 2026 (UTC) ‡ National team caps and goals as of 23:33, 30 September 2026 (UTC)

Ramiro Vaca Ponce (born 1 July 1999) is a Bolivian professional footballer who plays as a midfielder for Botola Pro club Wydad AC and the Bolivia national team.

== International career ==
Vaca made his international debut in a 1–0 friendly win over Nicaragua, replacing José Luis Vargas after 88 minutes.

== Career statistics ==
=== Club ===
As of 6 July 2026

Appearances and goals by club, season and competition
Club	Season	League			Cup		Continental		Other		Total	
Club	Season	Division	Apps	Goals	Apps	Goals	Apps	Goals	Apps	Goals	Apps	Goals
The Strongest	2018	FBF División Profesional	6	0	0	0	0	0	0	0	6	0
The Strongest	2019	FBF División Profesional	46	6	0	0	0	0	0	0	46	6
The Strongest	2020	FBF División Profesional	23	4	0	0	1 (Note: Appearances in Copa Libertadores)	0	0	0	24	4
The Strongest	2021	FBF División Profesional	12	2	0	0	6	0	0	0	18	2
The Strongest	Total		87	12	0	0	7	0	0	0	94	12
Beerschot	2021–22	Belgian Pro League	26	0	2	1	—		—		28	1
Beerschot	2022–23	Belgian Pro League	14	0	1	0	—		—		15	0
Beerschot	Total		40	0	3	1	—		—		43	1
Bolívar	2023	FBF División Profesional	29	8	0	0	5	0	15 (Note: Appearances in 2023 Copa de la División Profesional)	2	49	10
Bolívar	2024	FBF División Profesional	38	10	0	0	8	2	—		46	12
Bolívar	2025	FBF División Profesional	7	0	1	0	4	5	—		12	5
Bolívar	Total		74	18	1	0	17	7	15	2	107	27
Wydad AC	2025–26	Botola Pro	18	4	0	0	3 (Note: Appearances in CAF Confederations Cup)	1	0	0	21	5
Career total			219	34	4	1	27	8	15	2	265	45

=== International ===
As of matches played 30 September 2026

Appearances and goals by national team and year
National team	Year	Apps	Goals
Bolivia	2017	1	0
Bolivia	2018	1	0
Bolivia	2019	4	1
Bolivia	2021	12	1
Bolivia	2022	6	0
Bolivia	2023	5	1
Bolivia	2024	12	2
Bolivia	2025	2	0
Bolivia	2026	6	0
Total		49	5

Scores and results list Bolivia's goal tally first, score column indicates score after each Vaca goal.

List of international goals scored by Ramiro Vaca
No.	Date	Venue	Opponent	Score	Result	Competition
1	7 March 2019	Estadio Bicentenario, Villa Tunari, Bolivia	Nicaragua	1–2	2–2	Friendly
2	10 October 2021	Estadio Hernando Siles, La Paz, Bolivia	Peru	1–0	1–0	2022 FIFA World Cup qualification
3	16 November 2023	Estadio Hernando Siles, La Paz, Bolivia	Peru	2–0	2–0	2026 FIFA World Cup qualification
4	25 March 2024	19 May 1956 Stadium, Annaba, Algeria	Andorra	1–0	1–0	2024 FIFA Series
5	5 September 2024	Estadio Municipal de El Alto, El Alto, Bolivia	Venezuela	1–0	4–0	2026 FIFA World Cup qualification

== Honors ==
Bolívar

- Bolivian Primera División: 2024 Clausura
