= Tarik Tissoudali =

Moroccan footballer

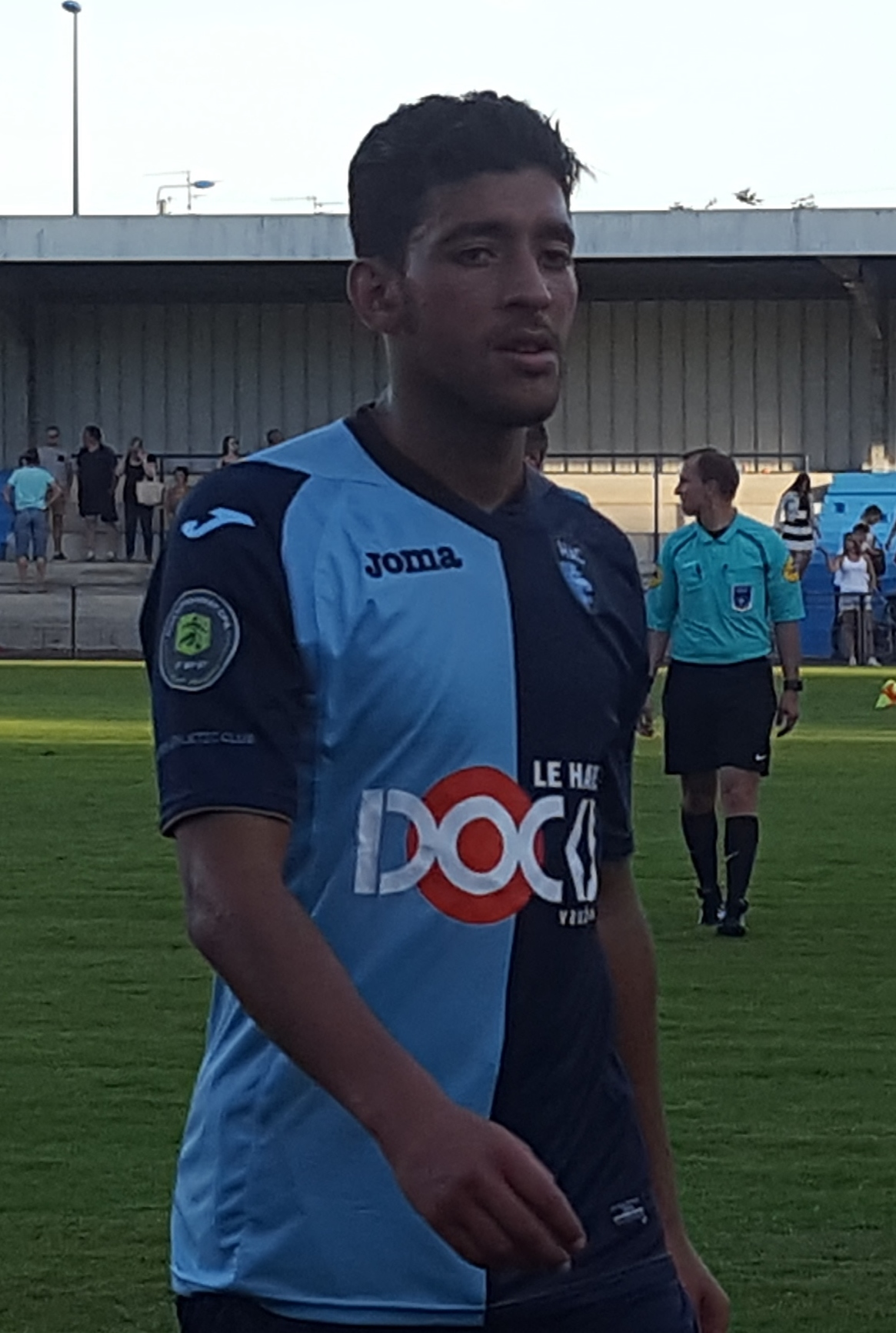
- Tissoudali in 2016

Personal information
- Date of birth: 2 April 1993 (age 33)
- Place of birth: Amsterdam, Netherlands
- Height: 1.82 m (6 ft 0 in)
- Positions: Winger; forward

Team information
- Current team: Khor Fakkan
- Number: 9

Youth career
- Argon
- Young Boys
- DWS
- Sparta Nijkerk

Senior career*
Years	Team	Apps	(Gls)
2014–2016	Telstar	73	(23)
2016–2018	Le Havre II	9	(2)
2017	→ Cambuur (loan)	18	(7)
2017–2018	→ VVV-Venlo (loan)	11	(1)
2018	→ De Graafschap (loan)	16	(9)
2018–2021	Beerschot	73	(20)
2021–2024	Gent	95	(43)
2024–2025	PAOK	16	(2)
2025	→ Khor Fakkan (loan)	12	(6)
2025–	Khor Fakkan	15	(7)

International career^{‡}
2016	Morocco U23	3	(1)
2022–	Morocco	14	(2)
2025–	Morocco A'	3	(1)
Medal record
Men's football
Representing Morocco
FIFA Arab Cup
Winner	2025 Qatar	Team
- * Club domestic league appearances and goals as of 17:50, 18 February 2026 (UTC) ‡ National team caps and goals as of 07:32, 13 December 2025 (UTC)

Tarik Tissoudali (Arabic: طارق تيسودالي; born 2 April 1993) is a professional footballer who plays as a winger for Khor Fakkan. Born in the Netherlands, he represents the Morocco national team.

In his career, he played most notably for Le Havre II, Beerschot, Gent, PAOK and Khor Fakkan. With Beerschot he won the 2019–20 Belgian First Division B and with Gent the 2021–22 Belgian Cup.

Born in the Netherlands, Tissoudali represented Morocco at international level, making his debut in 2022 and being part of the squads at two Africa Cup of Nations tournaments and one FIFA Arab Cup.

== Club career ==
In February 2021, he moved from Beerschot to Gent.

On 28 July 2024, it was announced by Greek club PAOK that he had joined the club on a permanent deal. He signed a two-year deal with an option for a third year.

== International career ==
Tissoudali made his debut for the Morocco U23s in a friendly 1–0 win against the Cameroon U23s, in which he scored the game-winning goal. He was called up to represent the senior Morocco national team for the 2021 Africa Cup of Nations. He debuted with them in a 1–0 win over Ghana on 10 January 2022.

He played an important role in Morocco's 2022 FIFA World Cup qualification campaign.

He was part of Morocco's squad at the 2023 Africa Cup of Nations.

== Career statistics ==
=== Club ===
As of match played 28 March 2025

Appearances and goals by club, season and competition
Club	Season	League			National cup (Note: Includes KNVB Cup, Belgian Cup, Greek Football Cup)		Europe		Other		Total	
Club	Season	Division	Apps	Goals	Apps	Goals	Apps	Goals	Apps	Goals	Apps	Goals
SV Argon	2011–12	Topklasse	1	0	0	0	–		–		1	0
Sparta Nijkerk	2012–13	Hoofdklasse	0	0	2	0	–		–		2	0
Telstar	2014–15	Eerste Divisie	37	4	1	0	–		–		38	4
Telstar	2015–16	Eerste Divisie	36	19	2	0	–		–		38	19
Telstar	Total		73	23	3	0	–		–		76	23
Le Havre II	2016–17	CFA	9	2	–		–		–		9	2
Cambuur (loan)	2016–17	Eerste Divisie	18	7	2	0	–		2 (Note: Appearances in Eredivisie promotion play-offs)	0	22	7
VVV (loan)	2017–18	Eredivisie	11	1	3	0	–		–		14	1
De Graafschap (loan)	2017–18	Eerste Divisie	16	9	0	0	–		4	1	20	10
Beerschot	2018–19	Belgian First Division B	24	6	3	0	–		10	1	37	7
Beerschot	2019–20	Belgian First Division B	20	5	2	0	–		–		22	5
Beerschot	2020–21	Belgian Pro League	19	8	0	0	–		–		19	8
Beerschot	Total		63	19	5	0	–		10	1	78	20
Gent	2020–21	Belgian Pro League	14	5	3	1	0	0	–		17	6
Gent	2021–22	Belgian Pro League	34	21	5	2	13 (Note: Appearances in UEFA Europa Conference League)	4	–		52	27
Gent	2022–23	Belgian Pro League	12	2	0	0	2	0	1 (Note: Appearance in Belgian Super Cup)	0	15	2
Gent	2023–24	Belgian Pro League	35	15	2	1	14	5	–		51	21
Gent	Total		95	43	10	4	29	9	1	0	145	56
PAOK	2024–25	Super League Greece	16	2	3	3	9 (Note: Two appearances in UEFA Champions League, seven appearances and one goal in UEFA Europa League)	1	–		28	6
Khor Fakkan (loan)	2024–25	UAE Pro League	5	2	–		–		–		5	2
Career total			307	108	28	7	38	10	17	2	390	127

=== International ===
Scores and results list Morocco's goal tally first, score column indicates score after each Tissoudali goal.

List of international goals scored by Tarik Tissoudali
No.	Date	Venue	Opponent	Score	Result	Competition
1	25 March 2022	Stade des Martyrs, Kinshasa, DR Congo	DR Congo	1–1	1–1	2022 FIFA World Cup qualification
2	29 March 2022	Stade Mohammed V, Casablanca, Morocco	DR Congo	2–0	4–1	2022 FIFA World Cup qualification
3	2 December 2025	Khalifa International Stadium, Al Rayyan, Qatar	Comoros	2–0	3–1	2025 FIFA Arab Cup

== Honours ==
Beerschot

- Belgian First Division B: 2019–20

Gent

- Belgian Cup: 2021–22
- Belgian Super Cup runner-up: 2022

Morocco A'

- FIFA Arab Cup: 2025

Individual

- Belgian Lion Award: 2021, 2022
- Ebony Shoe: 2022
- Belgian First Division Team of the Year: 2021–22
- Jean-Claude Bouvy Trophy: 2021–22
