= Stipe Radić =

Croatian footballer (born 2000)

Personal information
- Date of birth: 10 June 2000 (age 26)
- Place of birth: Split, Croatia
- Height: 1.91 m (6 ft 3 in)
- Position: Centre-back

Team information
- Current team: MTK Budapest

Youth career
- 2007–2011: Solin
- 2011–2018: Hajduk Split

Senior career*
Years	Team	Apps	(Gls)
2018–2020	Hajduk Split II	32	(2)
2019–2021	Hajduk Split	8	(0)
2021–2022	Beerschot	39	(2)
2022–2023	Fortuna Sittard	7	(0)
2023–2024	Zrinjski Mostar	14	(0)
2024–2026	Viborg	49	(4)
2026–	MTK Budapest	0	(0)

International career
2015	Croatia U15	5	(1)
2015–2016	Croatia U16	13	(1)
2016–2017	Croatia U17	17	(0)
2017–2018	Croatia U18	4	(0)
2018	Croatia U19	2	(0)
2019–2021	Croatia U20	3	(0)
- * Club domestic league appearances and goals as of 09:39, 8 July 2026 (UTC)

Stipe Radić (born 10 June 2000) is a Croatian professional footballer who plays as a centre-back for Nemzeti Bajnokság I club MTK Budapest.

== Club career ==
=== Hajduk Split ===
A native of Split, Croatia, Radić started his career with Solin before progressing through hometown club Hajduk Split's academy. He was then promoted to the reserves in the Croatian Second Football League to start his senior career. He made his debut for the reserve team on 11 November 2018, replacing Hrvoje Relota in the 66th minute of a 2–2 away draw against Bijelo Brdo.

Radić was promoted to the main team roster in late 2019. He made his first-team debut on 1 December 2019, playing the full match as Hajduk lost 4–0 at home to Rijeka in the league.

=== Beerschot ===
On 1 February 2021, Radić signed a two-and-a-half-year contract with Belgian Pro League club Beerschot, with an option to extend for two more years. Regarded a talented player, his transfer fee amounted to approximately €450,000, ranking as the fourth highest in Beerschot's history.

He made his debut for Beerschot on 7 February 2021, starting in a league match against Antwerp in which his side suffered a narrow 2–1 defeat at home. On 28 February 2021, he scored his first professional goal in a league game against Royal Excel Mouscron, securing a 2–2 draw in the 94th minute.

After Beerschot suffered relegation to the second division at the end of the 2021–22 season, he was set to leave the club after activating a relegation clause in his contract. However, the club challenged this, claiming that his attempt to activate the relegation clause was untimely. As a result, Radić stopped appearing for Beerschot and trained in Croatia to retain his form, leading the club to withhold his payment.

=== Fortuna Sittard ===
On 14 December 2022, Radić signed for Eredivisie club Fortuna Sittard on a contract until June 2024, joining as a free agent. This reignited the contractual dispute between the player and his former club Beerschot. However, according to documents obtained from the Royal Belgian Football Association (KBVB) by the Fortuna legal team, Radić was a free agent since 1 July 2022. Radić's lawyers claimed, that on 20 May 2022, he had sent a registered letter to Beerschot expressing his intention to activate the so-called "relegation clause." The deadline for this registered letter was 7 June 2022, and according to Radić's representatives, he complied well within the stipulated timeframe.

Radić made his Fortuna debut on 15 January 2023, starting and playing 83 minutes before being substituted off for Paul Gladon in a 2–2 home draw against PSV Eindhoven.

=== Zrinjski Mostar ===
On 3 September 2023, Radić signed a two-year contract with Zrinjski Mostar in Bosnia and Herzegovina.

=== Viborg FF ===
After four months at Zrinjski Mostar, Radić moved to Danish Superliga side Viborg FF on 30 January 2024, signing a deal with the club until June 2027. He made his debut for the club on 16 February, a 2–1 loss for the club to OB. He became a regular for the rest of the season, making 10 appearances in total. On 20 September, he scored his first goal for the club, giving them a 1–0 lead over Nordsjælland, a game which Viborg would go on to win 3–2.

=== MTK Budapest ===
After two years in Denmark, Radić was sold to Hungarian club MTK Budapest on 8 July 2026.

== International career ==
A youth international, Radić took part in the 2017 UEFA European Under-17 Championship played in his native Croatia with the under-17 team. The team was eliminated in the group stage, finishing last with two defeats and a draw. He gaining a total of 13 caps for the side.

As part of the under-19s, Radić started in two games in 2018.

Radić received his first call-up to the under-21 team in November 2021 by then-coach Igor Bišćan, replacing the injured Krešimir Krizmanić.

== Career statistics ==
As of match played 17 May 2026

Appearances and goals by club, season and competition
Club	Season	League			National cup (Note: Includes Croatian Football Cup, Belgian Cup, and Danish Cup)		Other		Total	
Club	Season	Division	Apps	Goals	Apps	Goals	Apps	Goals	Apps	Goals
Hajduk Split II	2018–19	Druga HNL	9	0	—		—		9	0
Hajduk Split II	2018–19	Druga HNL	11	0	—		—		11	0
Hajduk Split II	2020–21	Druga HNL	12	2	—		—		12	2
Hajduk Split II	Total		32	2	—		—		32	2
Hajduk Split	2019–20	Prva HNL	8	0	0	0	—		8	0
Hajduk Split	2020–21	Prva HNL	0	0	1	0	0	0	1	0
Hajduk Split	Total		8	0	1	0	0	0	9	0
Beerschot	2020–21	Belgian Pro League	9	1	1	0	—		10	1
Beerschot	2021–22	Belgian Pro League	30	1	2	0	—		32	1
Beerschot	Total		39	2	3	0	—		42	2
Fortuna Sittard	2022–23	Eredivisie	7	0	0	0	—		7	0
Zrinjski Mostar	2023–24	Premier League BH	14	0	—		—		14	0
Viborg	2023–24	Danish Superliga	10	0	0	0	—		10	0
Viborg	2024–25	Danish Superliga	20	3	7	1	—		27	3
Viborg	2025–26	Danish Superliga	19	1	4	0	—		23	1
Viborg	Total		49	4	12	1	—		61	5
Career total			149	8	16	1	0	0	165	9
