= Ayrton Mboko =

Belgian footballer

Personal information
- Full name: Ayrton Junior Mboko-Sambeya
- Date of birth: 23 October 1997 (age 29)
- Place of birth: Liège, Belgium
- Height: 1.79 m (5 ft 10 1/2 in)
- Position: Right back

Team information
- Current team: AS Vita Club
- Number: 12

Youth career
- 2009–2017: Standard Liège

Senior career*
Years	Team	Apps	(Gls)
2017–2018	Union SG	18	(0)
2018–2022	Beerschot	20	(0)
2022	Academica Clinceni	7	(0)
2022–2023	Farul Constanța	0	(0)
2023	Botoșani	8	(0)
2024	S.C. Eendracht Aalst		
2024–	AS Vita Club	2	(0)

International career
2013	Belgium U16	3	(1)
2013	Belgium U17	3	(0)
- * Club domestic league appearances and goals as of 1 July 2023

Ayrton Mboko (born 23 October 1997) is a Belgian footballer who plays as a right back.

== Club career ==
Ayrton Mboko started his career at Standard Liège.

=== Union SG ===
In the summer of 2017, Royale Union Saint-Gilloise announced the signing of Ayrton Mboko on atwo-years deal with an option to extend for a further season.

=== Beerschot ===
On 31 August 2018, Mboko joined Beerschot.

=== Academica Clinceni ===
On 21 February 2022, Academica Clinceni announced the signing of Ayrton Mboko on a half-year contract.

=== Farul Constanța ===
In the summer 2022, Farul Constanța announced the signing of Ayrton Mboko and Jeremy Corinus on three-year contract for both. However, on 7 December 2022, Mboko was released from the club after having his contract mutually terminated.

== Personal life ==
Mboko is born in Belgium and is of Congolese descent. Ayrton is the brother of the footballer Yohann Mboko.
