= Ryan Sanusi =

Belgian footballer

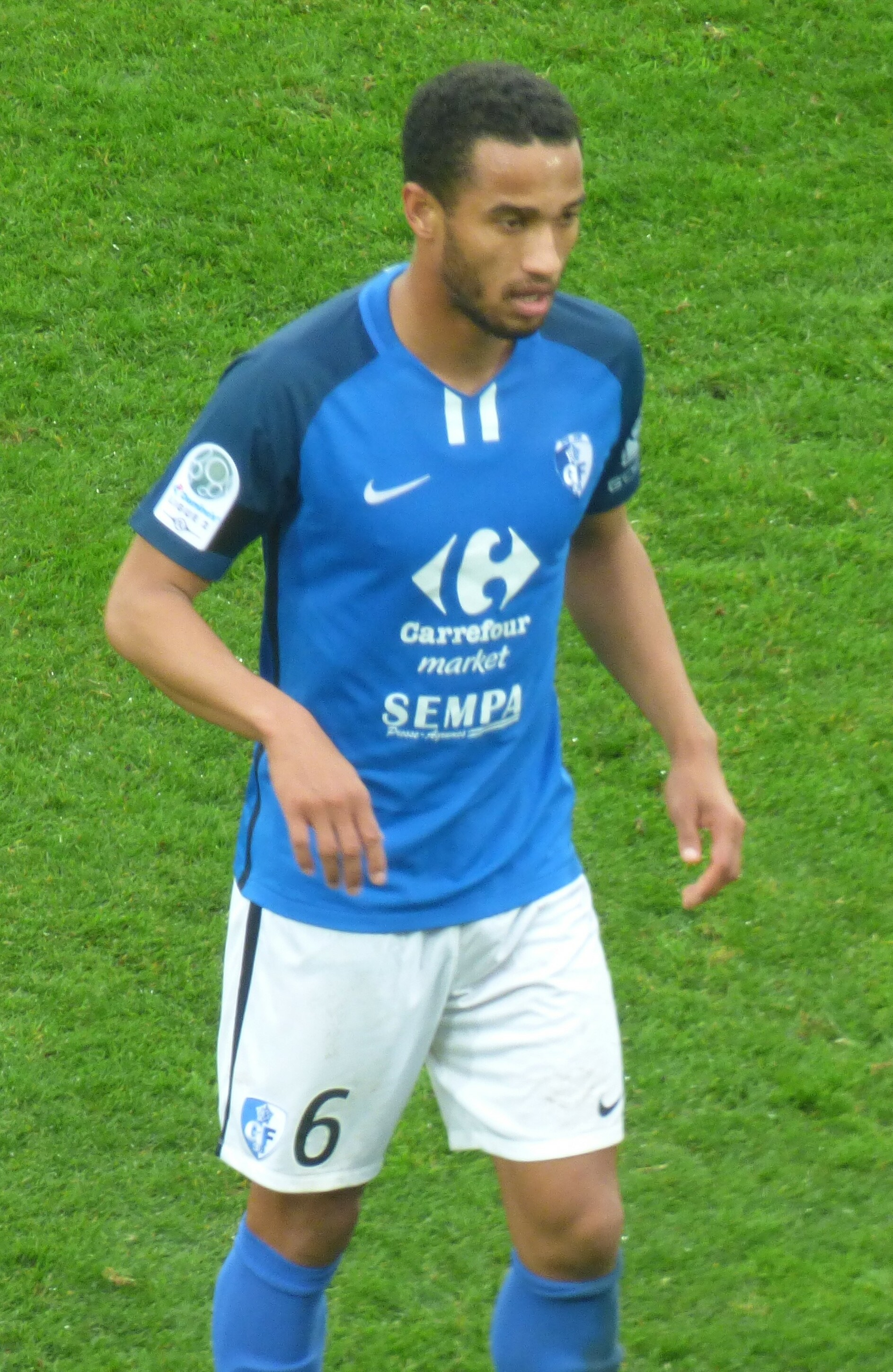
- Sanusi in 2018

Personal information
- Date of birth: 5 January 1992 (age 34)
- Place of birth: Borgerhout, Belgium
- Height: 1.81 m (5 ft 11 1/2 in)
- Position: Midfielder

Team information
- Current team: Sporting Hasselt
- Number: 18

Youth career
- Beerschot AC
- Willem II

Senior career*
Years	Team	Apps	(Gls)
2011–2015	Willem II	15	(1)
2014	→ FC Oss (loan)	11	(2)
2014–2015	→ FC Oss (loan)	21	(4)
2015–2018	Sparta Rotterdam	89	(9)
2018–2019	Grenoble	26	(1)
2019–2026	Beerschot	148	(9)
2026–	Sporting Hasselt	0	(0)

International career
2012	Belgium U20	1	(0)
- * Club domestic league appearances and goals as of 19 April 2026

Ryan Sanusi (born 5 January 1992) is a Belgian professional footballer who plays as a midfielder for Sporting Hasselt.

== Career ==
After a couple of seasons at Willem II, Sanusi joined up with Championship side Queens Park Rangers for their pre-season tour of Devon in July 2013. He played around 18 minutes in a pre-season friendly against Exeter City, which ended goalless.

Not being picked up by QPR, Sanusi went on to play 18 months on loan at FC Oss. On 28 May 2015, he signed a two-season contract with Sparta Rotterdam and won the Eerste Divisie Jupiler League title with Sparta in his first season at the club, 2015–16, sending the club from Rotterdam-West back to the Eredivisie after six years away.

After two seasons in the top flight, Sanusi and Sparta were relegated again back down to the Eerste again. He departed Sparta that summer in July 2018 for French Ligue 2 club Grenoble Foot 38.

After another year, in the summer of 2019, Sanusi signed a contract with Antwerp club Beerschot, returning to the club where it all started for him. In his first season, the club immediately became champions on the Belgian second flight, the First Division B, which meant that the club was once again promoted to the highest level of Belgian football.

They were relegated after two seasons in the top flight, mirroring his experience in the Netherlands, but came back up again in 2024.

== Personal life ==
Born in Belgium, Sanusi is of Nigerian descent.

== Honours ==
Sparta Rotterdam

- Eerste Divisie: 2015–16

Beerschot

- First Division B/Challenger Pro League: 2019–20, 2023–24
