= David Mukuna-Trouet =

Belgian footballer (born 2001)

Personal information
- Full name: David Honoré Mukuna-Trouet
- Date of birth: 2 October 2001 (age 25)
- Place of birth: Belgium
- Height: 1.92 m (6 ft 4 in)
- Position: Forward

Team information
- Current team: Jong KAA Gent
- Number: 78

Youth career
- 2018–2019: Lierse
- 2019–2020: Walhain

Senior career*
Years	Team	Apps	(Gls)
2020–2022	Beerschot	9	(0)
2022–	Jong KAA Gent	21	(6)
2024–	→ K.R.C. Gent (loan)	29	(22)
- * Club domestic league appearances and goals as of 20 April 2026

David Honoré Mukuna-Trouet (born 2 October 2001) is a Belgian professional footballer who plays as a forward for Challenger Pro League side Jong KAA Gent.

== Career ==
Mukuna-Trouet made his professional debut with Beerschot in a 6–3 Belgian First Division A win over Sint-Truidense on 17 October 2020.

On 12 April 2022, Mukuna-Trouet signed with Gent. For the 2022–23 season, he was assigned to the reserve squad Jong Gent which plays in the third-tier Belgian National Division 1.

== Personal life ==
Mukuna-Trouet is the grandson of the pioneer footballer Léon Mokuna, who was one of the first African footballers to play in Europe.
