= Antoine Lejoly =

Belgian footballer

Personal information
- Date of birth: 26 March 1998 (age 28)
- Place of birth: Verviers, Belgium
- Height: 1.89 m (6 ft 2 in)
- Position: Goalkeeper

Team information
- Current team: Eupen

Youth career
- 2012-2015: Standard Liège

Senior career*
Years	Team	Apps	(Gls)
2015–2018	Standard Liège	0	(0)
2018–2022	Beerschot	4	(0)
2022–2025	RFC Liège	33	(0)
2025–2026	ADO Den Haag	2	(0)
2026–	Eupen	0	(0)

International career
2013	Belgium U15	1	(0)
2013	Belgium U16	2	(0)
- * Club domestic league appearances and goals as of 28 April 2026

Antoine Lejoly (born 26 March 1998) is a Belgian professional footballer who plays as a goalkeeper for Challenger Pro League club Eupen.

== Professional career ==
A youth product of Standard Liège, Lejoly signed with Beerschot on 28 May 2018. Lejoly made his professional debut with Beerschot in a 3–2 Europa League play-off win over Westerlo on 4 May 2019.

On 3 August 2022, Lejoly signed a three-year contract with RFC Liège.

On 22 August 2025, Lejoly signed a one-year contract with ADO Den Haag, with the option of a one-season extension.

On 17 July 2026, Lejoly returned to Belgium and signed with Eupen.

== Career statistics ==
As of match played 24 April 2026

Appearances and goals by club, season and competition
Club	Season	League			Cup		Europe		Other		Total	
Club	Season	Division	Apps	Goals	Apps	Goals	Apps	Goals	Apps	Goals	Apps	Goals
Standard Liège	2015–16	Belgian Pro League	0	0	0	0	—		—		0	0
Beerschot	2021–22	Belgian Pro League	4	0	0	0	—		—		4	0
RFC Liège	2022–23	Belgian Division 1	11	0	—		—		—		11	0
RFC Liège	2023–24	Challenger Pro League	0	0	1	0	—		—		1	0
RFC Liège	2024–25	Challenger Pro League	22	0	1	0	—		—		23	0
RFC Liège	Total		33	0	2	0	—		—		35	0
ADO Den Haag	2025–26	Eerste Divisie	2	0	1	0	—		—		3	0
Career total			39	0	3	0	0	0	0	0	42	0

== Honours ==
ADO Den Haag

- Eerste Divisie: 2025–26
