= Apostolos Konstantopoulos =

Greek footballer

Personal information
- Date of birth: 2 August 2002 (age 24)
- Place of birth: Agrinio, Greece
- Height: 1.91 m (6 ft 3 in)
- Position: Centre-back

Team information
- Current team: Jagiellonia Białystok
- Number: 44

Youth career
- 2007–2020: Panetolikos

Senior career*
Years	Team	Apps	(Gls)
2019–2021	Panetolikos	27	(1)
2021–2025	Beerschot	92	(6)
2025–2026	Raków Częstochowa	12	(0)
2026–	Jagiellonia Białystok	13	(0)

International career
2017–2018	Greece U16	6	(0)
2019	Greece U17	2	(0)
2020–2024	Greece U21	14	(0)
- * Club domestic league appearances and goals as of 18:46, 20 September 2026 (UTC)

Apostolos Konstantopoulos (Greek: Απόστολος Κωνσταντόπουλος; born 2 August 2002) is a Greek professional footballer who plays as a centre-back for Ekstraklasa club Jagiellonia Białystok.

== Career ==
Konstantopoulos played for Panetolikos youth academy for almost 13 years, before he started playing with the senior team. On 6 July 2020, he scored his first goal with the club in a 2–2 away draw against Atromitos and subsequently became the youngest football player to play in the Greek play-offs, the youngest to score in 2020–21 season, but also the youngest in the history of the club. In the 2020–21 season, his first full campaign with Panetolikos, he played 26 times in all competitions.

On 18 June 2021, Beerschot announced the acquisition of the 18-year-old central defender from a €500,000 transfer fee, who signed a contract until 2024 with the possibility of extending their cooperation for another year.

Konstantopoulos was relegated with Beerschot at the end of the 2021–22 season, but after two seasons they won the Challenger Pro League for 2024, earning promotion back up to the top flight, the Belgian Pro League.

On 1 July 2025, Konstantopoulos moved on a free transfer to Polish club Raków Częstochowa on a three-year contract, with an option for another year.

On 30 January 2026, Konstantopoulos completed a move to fellow Ekstraklasa side Jagiellonia Białystok, signing an eighteen-month deal with a one-year option.

== Honours ==
Beerschot

- Challenger Pro League: 2023–24
