= Alexander Maes =

Belgian footballer

Personal information
- Full name: Alexander Maes
- Date of birth: 12 March 1992 (age 34)
- Place of birth: Genk, Belgium
- Height: 1.74 m (5 ft 9 in)
- Position: Midfielder

Team information
- Current team: KRC Mechelen
- Number: 10

Senior career*
Years	Team	Apps	(Gls)
2012–2013	Willem II	0	(0)
2013	Lommel United	9	(0)
2013–2015	RC Hades	0	(0)
2015–2016	Cappellen	34	(15)
2016–2020	Beerschot	94	(12)
2020–2021	Argeș Pitești	13	(1)
2021–2022	Lierse	15	(2)
2022	RC Hades	12	(0)
2022–2024	Lokeren-Temse	58	(4)
2024–2025	Las Rozas		
2025–	KRC Mechelen	0	(0)
- * Club domestic league appearances and goals as of 25 January 2026

Alexander Maes (born 12 March 1992) is a Belgian professional footballer who plays as a midfielder for Belgian club KRC Mechelen.

== Club career ==
Maes started his career with Willem II.

He signed with Romanian club Argeș Pitești in October 2020, after having played for Beerschot for four seasons.

On 12 April 2021, Maes signed a one-year contract with Lierse Kempenzonen in the Belgian First Division B, with an option for an additional year.

On 31 January 2022, Maes returned to RC Hades in the fourth-tier Belgian Division 2 on a 3.5-year contract.
