= Pietro Perdichizzi =

Belgian footballer

Personal information
- Date of birth: 16 December 1992 (age 33)
- Place of birth: Charleroi, Belgium
- Height: 1.82 m (6 ft 0 in)
- Position: Centre back

Team information
- Current team: Lierse
- Number: 2

Senior career*
Years	Team	Apps	(Gls)
2009–2011	Charleroi	15	(0)
2011–2013	Club Brugge	0	(0)
2012–2013	→ Zulte Waregem (loan)	1	(0)
2013–2015	Roeselare	35	(0)
2015–2016	Antwerp	9	(0)
2016–2020	Union SG	98	(9)
2020–2024	Westerlo	71	(2)
2024–	Lierse	39	(3)

International career
2010–2011	Belgium U19	12	(0)
2012	Belgium U21	4	(0)
- * Club domestic league appearances and goals as of 20 April 2026

Pietro Perdichizzi (born 16 December 1992) is a Belgian professional footballer who plays as a centre-back for Challenger Pro League club Lierse.

== Club career ==
On 28 June 2024, Perdichizzi signed a three-year contract with Lierse.

== International career ==
Born in Belgium, Perdichizzi is of Italian descent. He is a youth international for Belgium, having played up to the Belgium U21s.

== Honours ==
Westerlo

- Belgian First Division B: 2021–22
