= Wouter Biebauw =

Belgian footballer

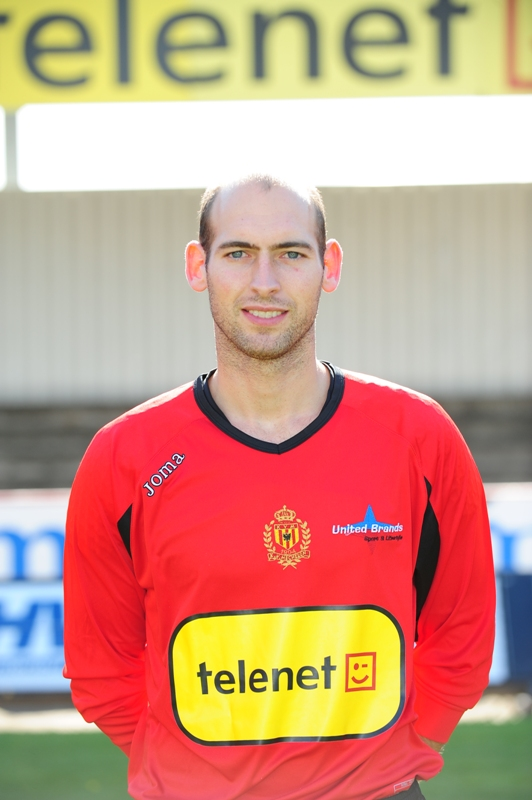

Personal information
- Date of birth: 21 May 1984 (age 42)
- Place of birth: Deerlijk, Belgium
- Height: 1.88 m (6 ft 2 in)
- Position: Goalkeeper

Youth career
- 1991–1998: KSV Deerlijk Sport
- 1998–2000: KV Kortrijk
- 2000–2002: KRC Harelbeke

Senior career*
| Years | Team | Apps | (Gls) |
| 2005–2008 | Roeselare | 40 | (0) |
| 2008–2015 | Mechelen | 124 | (0) |
| 2015–2016 | Oostende | 11 | (0) |
| 2016–2020 | Roeselare | 121 | (0) |
| 2020–2022 | Beerschot | 8 | (0) |
| Total | | 304 | (0) |
- * Club domestic league appearances and goals

Wouter Biebauw (born 21 May 1984) is a Belgian former professional footballer who played as a goalkeeper.
