= Tom Pietermaat =

Belgian footballer

Personal information
- Full name: Tom Daniel Bart Pietermaat
- Date of birth: 6 September 1992 (age 34)
- Place of birth: Belgium
- Height: 1.72 m (5 ft 8 in)
- Position: Defender

Team information
- Current team: Houtvenne
- Number: 29

Senior career*
Years	Team	Apps	(Gls)
2010–2013	Mechelen	1	(0)
2011–2012	→ Rupel Boom (loan)	28	(0)
2012–2013	→ Eendracht Aalst (loan)	28	(1)
2013–2014	Racing Mechelen	27	(0)
2014–2022	Beerschot	153	(2)
2022–2025	Patro Eisden	69	(4)
2025–	Houtvenne	25	(0)

International career
2007	Belgium U16	2	(0)
2008–2009	Belgium U17	3	(0)
2009–2010	Belgium U18	13	(0)
2010–2011	Belgium U19	22	(0)
2012	Belgium U20	1	(0)
- * Club domestic league appearances and goals as of 3 May 2026

Tom Daniel Bart Pietermaat (born 6 September 1992) is a Belgian footballer who plays for Belgian Division 1 club Houtvenne.
