= Mike Vanhamel =

Belgian footballer

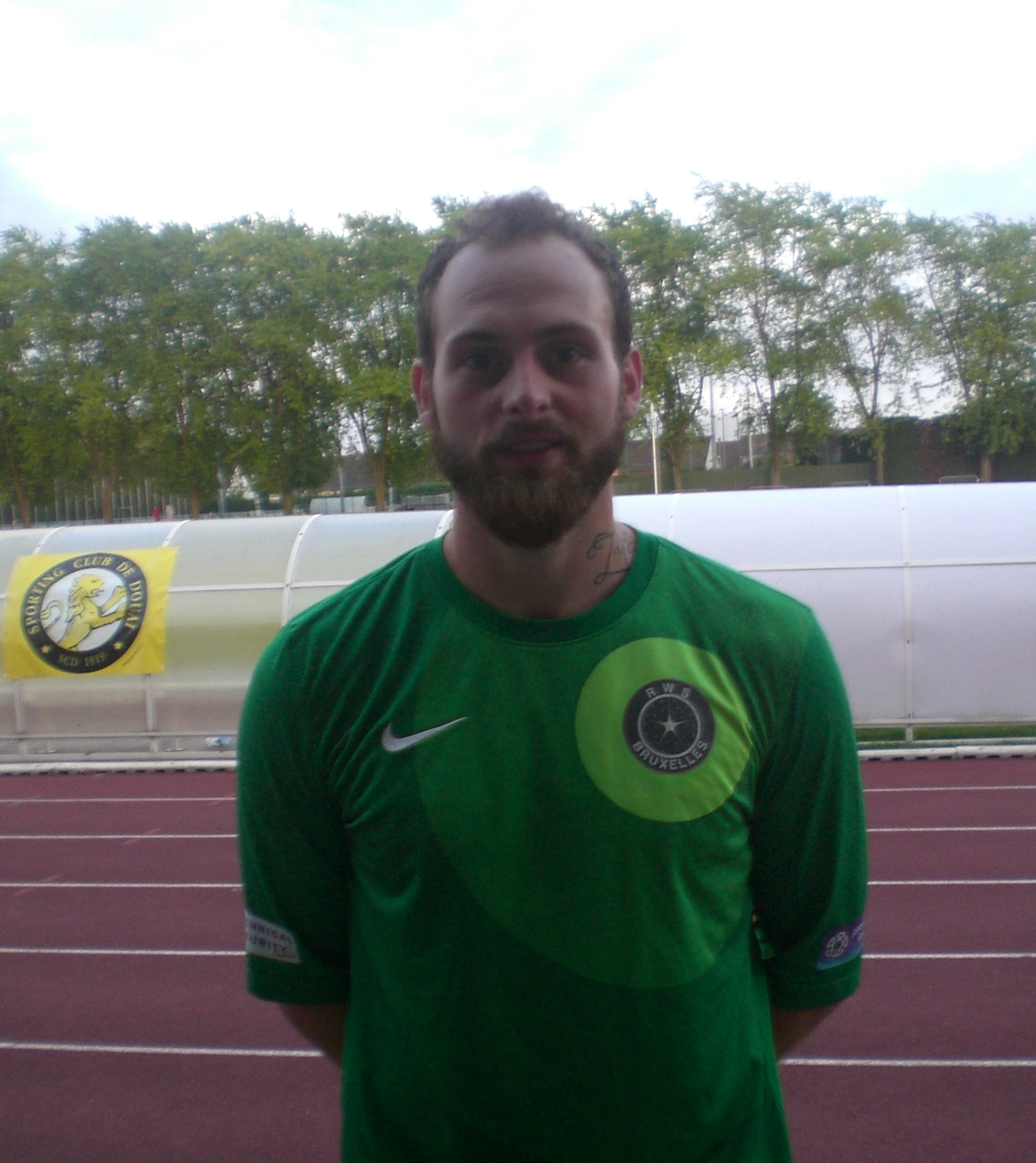
- Vanhamel with WS Bruxelles in July 2015

Personal information
- Full name: Mike Vanhamel
- Date of birth: 16 November 1989 (age 36)
- Place of birth: Elsene, Belgium
- Height: 1.89 m (6 ft 2 in)
- Position: Goalkeeper

Team information
- Current team: Cappellen
- Number: 1

Youth career
- 1995–1998: Tervuren
- 1998–1999: Zwarte Duivels Oud-Heverlee
- 1999–2000: RWDM
- 2000–2001: Mechelen
- 2001–2005: Anderlecht
- 2005–2006: Charleroi

Senior career*
Years	Team	Apps	(Gls)
2006–2007	OH Leuven	20	(0)
2007–2011	Le Havre	10	(0)
2011–2012	Westerlo	7	(0)
2012–2014	Laval	28	(0)
2014–2015	NEC	3	(0)
2015–2016	WS Bruxelles	28	(0)
2016–2017	Lierse	28	(0)
2017–2018	Oostende	6	(0)
2018–2023	Beerschot	137	(0)
2023–2024	RAAL La Louvière	34	(0)
2024–2025	Tienen	25	(0)
2026–	Cappellen	15	(0)

International career
2004	Belgium U15	1	(0)
2005	Belgium U17	1	(0)
2007–2008	Belgium U19	3	(0)
2009	Belgium U21	1	(0)
- * Club domestic league appearances and goals as of 25 January 2026

Mike Vanhamel (born 16 November 1989) is a Belgian professional footballer who plays as a goalkeeper for Cappellen.

== Career ==
Vanhamel began his career at R.S.C. Anderlecht before joining to R. Charleroi S.C. in 2005, where he stayed for one season before moving to Oud-Heverlee Leuven, playing in the EXQI-League. At OH Leuven he played his first official game fon 17 September 2006 against Hamme. In 2007, he left Leuven after two seasons, moving to Ligue 2 club Le Havre AC. There played his first game on 16 May 2008 against Bastia and played his first game in Ligue 1 against Nice. In August 2011 he returned to Belgium, signing a contract for three years with K.V.C. Westerlo playing in the Jupiler League. On 25 July 2012, he signed a one-year contract with French Ligue 2 club Laval, with an option for another one. After his contract had expired mid 2014, Vanhamel signed a one-year deal with Dutch Eerste Divisie side NEC. He then switched clubs each season, moving to Lierse, Oostende and Beerschot Wilrijk.

== Honours ==
=== Club ===
NEC

- Eerste Divisie: 2014–15

WS Bruxelles

- Belgian Second Division: 2015–16
