= Pierre Bourdin =

French footballer (born 1994)

Personal information
- Date of birth: 6 January 1994 (age 32)
- Place of birth: Vincennes, France
- Height: 1.85 m (6 ft 1 in)
- Position: Defender

Team information
- Current team: Avranches
- Number: 3

Youth career
- 2000–2004: FC Les Lilas
- 2005–2011: Paris Saint-Germain

Senior career*
Years	Team	Apps	(Gls)
2011–2014	Paris Saint-Germain B	57	(0)
2014–2017	Cercle Brugge	97	(3)
2017–2018	Lierse	27	(5)
2018–2022	Beerschot	107	(5)
2022–2023	Virton	13	(1)
2023–2024	Vire	24	(0)
2024–2026	Avranches	38	(1)
2026 -	Vire		

International career
2009	France U16	3	(0)
2010–2011	France U17	4	(0)
2011	France U18	2	(0)
2013	France U20	5	(0)
- * Club domestic league appearances and goals as of 4 December 2025

Pierre Bourdin (born 6 January 1994) is a French professional footballer who plays as a defender for Championnat National 3 club Vire.

== Club career ==
Bourdin joined Cercle Brugge in 2014 from Paris Saint-Germain F.C. B. He made his Belgian Pro League debut at 26 July 2014 at the opening game of the 2013–14 season against K.A.A. Gent.

On 4 January 2023, Bourdin joined Virton on an eighteen-month contract.

On 3 July 2024, Bourdin signed for Championnat National 2 club Avranches. After two seasons he returned back to AF Virois for the start of the 2026-27 season.
