= Joren Dom =

Belgian footballer

Personal information
- Date of birth: 29 November 1989 (age 36)
- Place of birth: Antwerp, Belgium
- Height: 1.73 m (5 ft 8 in)
- Positions: Right back; defensive midfielder

Team information
- Current team: RSCA Futures
- Number: 85

Youth career
- –2011: Mechelen

Senior career*
Years	Team	Apps	(Gls)
2009–2011	→ Rupel Boom (loan)	41	(7)
2011–2012	Dender EH	34	(3)
2012–2017	Antwerp	117	(7)
2017–2022	Beerschot	108	(6)
2022–2024	OH Leuven	59	(0)
2024–	RSCA Futures	15	(1)
- * Club domestic league appearances and goals as of 6 May 2025

Joren Dom (born 29 November 1989) is a Belgian footballer who plays for RSCA Futures in the Challenger Pro League as a right back or a defensive midfielder.
