= Euloge Placca Fessou =

Togolese footballer

Personal information
- Full name: Euloge Mèmè Placca Fessou
- Date of birth: 31 December 1994 (age 31)
- Place of birth: Lomé, Togo
- Height: 1.87 m (6 ft 1 1/2 in)
- Position: Forward

Team information
- Current team: Yelimay
- Number: 77

Youth career
- 2004–2012: OC Agaza

Senior career*
Years	Team	Apps	(Gls)
2012–2013	OC Agaza		
2013–2014	Servette	23	(2)
2014–2016	Oosterzonen Oosterwijk	50	(22)
2016–2022	Beerschot	91	(28)
2020–2021	→ Lierse Kempenzonen (loan)	23	(6)
2021–2022	→ Al Tadhamon (loan)		(8)
2022–2023	Shakhtyor Soligorsk	39	(13)
2024	Jeonnam Dragons	17	(7)
2025–	Yelimay	55	(18)

International career^{‡}
2012–	Togo	36	(9)
- * Club domestic league appearances and goals as of 1 November 2026 ‡ National team caps and goals as of 5 August 2026

Euloge Mèmè Placca Fessou (born 31 December 1994) is a Togolese professional footballer who plays as a forward for Yelimay. He also plays as an international for Togo since 2012.

== Honours ==
K Beerschot VA

- Belgian First Amateur Division: 2016–17
