= Frédéric Frans =

Belgian football manager (born 1989)

Personal information
- Date of birth: 3 January 1989 (age 37)
- Place of birth: Wespelaar, Belgium
- Height: 1.93 m (6 ft 4 in)
- Position: Centre-back

Team information
- Current team: Helmond Sport (head coach)

Youth career
- 1995–2006: Lierse

Senior career*
Years	Team	Apps	(Gls)
2006–2014	Lierse	99	(4)
2014–2016	Partick Thistle	41	(3)
2016–2018	Lierse	65	(3)
2018–2019	Dundee United	20	(1)
2019–2020	Lierse Kempenzonen	12	(0)
2020–2023	Beerschot	65	(4)
Total		162	(8)

International career
2007	Belgium U18	1	(0)
2007–2008	Belgium U19	6	(0)
2010	Belgium U20	2	(0)

Managerial career
- 2024–2025: Sporting Hasselt
- 2025: RWDM Brussels
- 2026–: Helmond Sport
- * Club domestic league appearances and goals

Frédéric Frans (born 3 January 1989) is a Belgian football manager and former professional footballer who is the head coach of Eerste Divisie club Helmond Sport.

A ball‑playing centre‑back, he graduated from the Lierse academy and went on to make more than 150 first‑team appearances across two spells, either side of two seasons in Scotland with Partick Thistle. Frans returned to Scottish football in 2018 with Dundee United before finishing his playing career in Belgium with Lierse Kempenzonen and Beerschot VA. Internationally, he was capped by Belgium at under‑18, under‑19 and under‑20 level.

Frans began coaching at Beerschot, leading the under‑23 side and assisting the first team, before accepting his first senior managerial post with Sporting Hasselt in July 2024, steering the newly promoted club to a top‑four finish in the Belgian Division 1. He was appointed head coach of RWDM Brussels on a two‑year contract in July 2025.

== Club career ==
=== Lierse ===
Frans first joined Lierse at age six when he was spotted by Lierse's scout whilst playing for Olympia Wespelaar. Frans had progress throughout the youth team and soon under the management of Kjetil Rekdal, Frans was given a debut, coming on as a substitute for Yoni Buyens in the 90th minute, in a 3–0 loss against Genk on 27 January 2007. Shortly after, Frans signed his first professional contract with the club when he was 17. Frans went on to make thirteen appearances for the club in his second half of the season, though it saw Lierse relegated to the Second Division.

Frans then scored his first goal for the club, in a 2–1 loss against Charleroi on 1 March 2008. Frans went on to make twenty-three appearances in his first full season at Lierse. The next season saw Frans score three goals against VW Hamme in the opening game of the season and also another against them on 27 December 2008; and Eupen in his twenty-three appearances. The 2009–10 season saw things going good for Lierse, as Frans helped the club win the second division. Frans was soon appointed as the new captain of Lierse under the management of Eric Van Meir.

However the 2010–11 season didn't go well for Frans after he injured his knee that kept him out throughout the season, which he made eleven appearances. Weeks before the injury, Frans was involved in an incident that got him sent-off against Club Brugge on 13 November 2010 and eventually, his sending off was rescinded. At the end of the 2010–11 season, Frans signed a three-year contract with Lierse, keeping him until 2014.

In the 2011–12 season, Frans made his first appearance of the season since recovering from his injury, in a 2–1 loss against Mechelen on 14 August 2011. Frans was then sent-off in a 4–0 loss against Anderlecht on 30 October 2011 and this saw him receive a one match ban, as well as, being fined for 100 euro. He then scored his first goal, in a 2–2 draw against Kortrijk on 17 December 2011. Frans was largely used in the first team, as he made thirteen appearances.

In the 2012–13 season, Frans sustained a knee injury in training that caused him to miss the start of the season. After being sidelined for a month, Frans made his first appearance of the season, in a 2–0 loss against Mechelen on 16 February 2013. From that point, Frans went on to make nine appearances for the rest of the season.

In 2013–14 season, Frans was once again on the sideline at the start of the season and made his first appearance of the season, in a 1–0 loss against Lokeren on 30 October 2013. Two months later, on 26 December 2013, Frans was sent-off, in a 3–0 win over Mechelen and after this, the club appealed his suspension. As a result, Frans' suspension was reduced to one game, though he was fined 300 euro. After making five appearances, Frans was released by the club, ending his nineteen years association with the club. Frans later revealed he was offered a three-year contract with the club, but turned it down, due to the current situation with the club's ownership.

During his career at Lierse, Frans revealed he's good friends with Charlie Miller.

=== Partick Thistle ===
He joined the club in October 2014 on a three-month contract, having been out of contract at his previous club, Lierse, earlier in the year. Frans revealed that he was all set to join Leeds United, but the move fell through after the club sacked Dave Hockaday and find then club's owner Massimo Cellino strange the way he ran the club. Frans also stated that after leaving Lierse, he was keen to play abroad.

Frans made his debut for the club in a 0–0 draw against St Johnstone in the Scottish Premiership. On 15 December 2014, Frans agreed an extension to his contract, keeping him at the club until 2016. Frans then scored his first goal for the Jags in 2–2 draw away to Kilmarnock on 24 January 2015. Frans then scored his second goal for the club in a 2–1 win over Ross County. Frans collected the ball and unleashed a 30-yard shot past the keeper into the net. In his first season at Partick Thistle, Frans made twenty-two appearances and scored two times in all competitions.

=== Dundee United ===
After two seasons back at Lierse, Frans signed for Scottish Championship club Dundee United in June 2018. On 2 September 2019, Dundee United announced that Frans had left the club, having made 25 appearances and scoring two goals while with the club.

=== Return to Belgium ===
After leaving Dundee United, Frans returned to Belgium on 4 September 2019, signing for Lierse Kempenzonen in the Belgian First Division B.

On 2 January 2020 Frans moved to Beerschot VA, the club honouring a verbal agreement to release him should a higher‑level opportunity arise. He helped Beerschot win promotion to the Jupiler Pro League at the end of the COVID-19-affected 2019–20 campaign and, having become a defensive mainstay, extended his contract until 2023 the following August.

Frans's 2021–22 season was curtailed when he ruptured an Achilles tendon against KV Mechelen on 17 October 2021. After a ten‑month recovery he returned on 19 August 2022, featuring in a 1–0 win over Beveren.

Injury problems persisted, but he played eight of ten promotion‑play‑off matches—six as a substitute—before announcing his retirement. His final professional appearance came on 13 May 2023, a home defeat to former club Lierse Kempenzonen. Two weeks later he released a farewell video confirming his retirement from professional football.

== International career ==
Frans represented Belgium at under‑18, under‑19 and under‑20 level between 2007 and 2009, appearing in UEFA youth qualifiers and friendly tournaments.

== Managerial career ==
Following his retirement as a player with Beerschot in 2023, Frans remained at the Kielstadion as head coach of the club's under-23 side while also serving as assistant to first-team manager Dirk Kuyt.

On 3 July 2024 he was appointed head coach of Sporting Hasselt, newly promoted to the Belgian Division 1. In his only season at the helm he guided the club to fourth place in their group, the best finish achieved by a promoted side that campaign.

Frans left Hasselt at the conclusion of the 2024–25 season to take charge of RWDM Brussels in the Challenger Pro League, signing a two-year contract on 26 July 2025. He was dismissed on 14 December 2025, after the team only gained three points in the latest seven games.

On 1 May 2026, Frans was appointed new head coach of Eerste Divisie club Helmond Sport, signing a two-year contract with the Dutch club.
