= Jan Van den Bergh =

Belgian footballer (born 1994)

Personal information
- Date of birth: 2 October 1994 (age 32)
- Place of birth: Bonheiden, Belgium
- Height: 1.90 m (6 ft 3 in)
- Position: Centre-back

Team information
- Current team: NAC Breda
- Number: 12

Youth career
- 2002–2003: FC Baal
- 2003–2007: Lierse
- 2007–2014: Westerlo

Senior career*
Years	Team	Apps	(Gls)
2014–2016	Heist	54	(3)
2016–2019	Beerschot Wilrijk	94	(9)
2019–2020	Gent	0	(0)
2020	→ OH Leuven (loan)	5	(2)
2020–2023	Beerschot	82	(8)
2023–2025	NAC Breda	65	(6)
2025–2026	Júbilo Iwata	27	(3)
2026–	NAC Breda	9	(0)
- * Club domestic league appearances and goals as of 3 October 2026

Jan Van den Bergh (born 2 October 1994) is a Belgian professional footballer who plays as a centre-back for Eerste Divisie club NAC Breda.

== Career ==
Jan Van den Bergh started his career with KSK Heist. In 2020, he was loaned to Oud-Heverlee Leuven for six months, scoring a goal in each of his first two appearances, the second goal a spectacular overhead kick.

On 4 July 2023, Van den Bergh moved to Dutch Eerste Divisie side NAC Breda, signing a deal until June 2026. Van den Bergh was a key member of the NAC team in 2023–24, making 42 appearances and scoring six goals as NAC finished in eighth position and won the promotion play-offs.

On 18 August 2024, van den Bergh netted a header in stoppage time to lift newly promoted NAC Breda to a 2–1 win over Ajax.

On 4 August 2026, Van den Bergh returned to NAC Breda on a three-year contract.
