= 2019–20 SV Zulte Waregem season =

S.V. Zulte Waregem
2019–20 season
- Chairman: Willy Naessens
- Manager: Francky Dury
- Stadium: Regenboogstadion
- First Division A: 9th
- Belgian Cup: Semi-finals
- Top goalscorer: League: Gianni Bruno (9); All: Gianni Bruno (12)

The 2019–20 S.V. Zulte Waregem season was the club's 19th season in existence and the 15th consecutive season in the top flight of Belgian football. In addition to the domestic league, Zulte Waregem participated in this season's edition of the Belgian Cup.

== Players ==
Note: Flags indicate national team as defined under FIFA eligibility rules; some limited exceptions apply. Players may hold more than one non-FIFA nationality.

No.	Pos.	Nation	Player
1	GK	BEL	Sammy Bossut
2	DF	BEL	Davy De fauw (captain)
3	DF	CGO	Marvin Baudry
4	DF	GHA	Gideon Mensah (on loan from RB Salzburg)
5	MF	FRA	Damien Marcq
6	MF	FRA	Abdoulaye Sissako
9	FW	CAN	Cyle Larin (on loan from Beşiktaş)
10	MF	MEX	Omar Govea
11	MF	TUN	Bassem Srarfi
14	DF	NED	Sandy Walsh
17	MF	FRA	Jean-Luc Dompé
18	DF	SWE	Erdin Demir

No.	Pos.	Nation	Player
19	FW	BEL	Gianni Bruno
20	MF	NOR	Henrik Bjørdal
21	MF	SEN	Ibrahima Seck
22	FW	BEL	Jelle Vossen
24	DF	BEL	Ewoud Pletinckx
25	GK	BEL	Louis Bostyn
27	FW	SUI	Dimitri Oberlin (on loan from Basel)
38	FW	BDI	Saido Berahino
43	DF	GRE	Nikos Kenourgios
44	GK	GER	Eike Bansen
45	DF	BEL	Olivier Deschacht
52	DF	MAR	Hotman El Kababri
67	MF	BEL	Jannes Van Hecke

=== On loan ===
Note: Flags indicate national team as defined under FIFA eligibility rules; some limited exceptions apply. Players may hold more than one non-FIFA nationality.

No.	Pos.	Nation	Player
7	MF	GEO	Luka Zarandia (at Tobol until 30 June 2020)
17	MF	FIN	Mikael Soisalo (at Varzim until 30 June 2020)
33	DF	ENG	Cameron Humphreys-Grant (at Excelsior until 30 June 2020)
40	FW	GUI	Idrissa Sylla (at Oostende until 30 June 2020)
—	FW	NED	Robert Mühren (at SC Cambuur until 30 June 2020)

== Pre-season and friendlies ==
Win Draw Loss

25 June 2019 Friendly	Sparta Petegem (Belgium)	1–0	(Belgium) Zulte Waregem	Deinze
19:30 CEST (UTC+2)				Stadium: Complex Gaversesteenweg

29 June 2019 Friendly	OH Leuven (Belgium)	3–1	(Belgium) Zulte Waregem	Deinze
18:00 CEST (UTC+2)				Stadium: Complex Gaversesteenweg

3 July 2019 Friendly	Cercle Brugge (Belgium)	2–3	(Belgium) Zulte Waregem	Lichtervelde
19:00 CEST (UTC+2)				Stadium: Stadion Lichtervelde

6 July 2019 Friendly	Deinze (Belgium)	0–2	(Belgium) Zulte Waregem	Deinze
19:00 CEST (UTC+2)				Stadium: Dakota Arena

13 July 2019 Friendly	Zulte Waregem (Belgium)	2–2	(Belgium) Lokeren	Deinze
19:00 CEST (UTC+2)				Stadium: Complex Gaversesteenweg

16 July 2019 Friendly	Zulte Waregem (Belgium)	1–1	(Belgium) Oostende	Deinze
19:00 CEST (UTC+2)				Stadium: Complex Gaversesteenweg

20 July 2019 Friendly	Zulte Waregem (Belgium)	1–1	(Netherlands) Willem II	Waregem
15:00 CEST (UTC+2)				Stadium: Elindus Arena

10 January 2020 Friendly	PEC Zwolle (Netherlands)	1–3	(Belgium) Zulte Waregem	Mijas
--:-- CET (UTC+1)	Reza Ghoochannejhad 61'		Mathieu De Smet 13', 17'; Nikolaos Kenourgios 86'

== Competitions ==
=== Overall record ===
Competition	First match	Last match	Starting round	Final position	Record							
Competition	First match	Last match	Starting round	Final position	Pld	W	D	L	GF	GA	GD	Win %
First Division A	27 July 2019	7 March 2020	Matchday 1	9th	29	10	6	13	41	49	−8	34.48
Belgian Cup	25 September 2019	5 February 2020	Sixth round	Semi-finals	5	3	1	1	11	5	+6	60.00
Total					34	13	7	14	52	54	−2	38.24

Source: Competitions

=== First Division A ===
==== League table ====
Pos	Team	Pld	W	D	L	GF	GA	GD	Pts
7	Genk	29	13	5	11	45	42	+3	44
8	Anderlecht	29	11	10	8	45	29	+16	43
9	Zulte Waregem	29	10	6	13	41	49	−8	36
10	Excel Mouscron	29	9	9	11	38	40	−2	36
11	Kortrijk	29	9	6	14	40	44	−4	33

Source: Belgian First Division A (in Dutch), Soccerway
Rules for classification: 1) Points; 2) Matches won; 3) Goal difference; 4) Goals scored; 5) Away goals scored; 6) Away matches won; 7) Play-off.

==== Results by round ====
Round	1	2	3	4	5	6	7	8	9	10	11	12	13	14	15	16	17	18	19	20	21	22	23	24	25	26	27	28	29	30
Ground	H	A	A	H	A	H	A	H	A	H	A	H	H	A	H	A	H	A	H	A	A	H	A	H	A	H	A	H	A	H
Result	L	L	W	W	D	W	D	D	D	W	L	W	L	W	L	W	W	L	W	L	L	L	L	W	L	L	D	D	L	C
Position																														

Updated to match(es) played on 7 March 2020. Source: Jupiler Pro League
A = Away; H = Home; W = Win; D = Draw; L = Loss

==== Matches ====
On 2 April 2020, the Jupiler Pro League's board of directors proposed to cancel the season due to the COVID-19 pandemic. The General Assembly accepted the proposal on 15 May, and officially ended the 2019–20 season.

27 July 2019 1	Zulte Waregem	0–2	Mechelen	Waregem
20:00 CEST (UTC+2)			Storm 20'; Engvall 56'	Stadium: Regenboogstadion; Referee: Jonathan Lardot

3 August 2019 2	Standard Liège	4–0	Zulte Waregem	Liège
18:00 CEST (UTC+2)	Walsh 2' (o.g.); Lestienne 45+1'; Emond 69', 75'		Deschacht (red card) 46'	Stadium: Stade Maurice Dufrasne

10 August 2019 3	Genk	0–2	Zulte Waregem	Genk
20:30 CEST (UTC+2)	Heynen (yellow card) 90+3'	Report	Bjørdal 6', (yellow card) 56'; Bürki (yellow card) 65'; Berahino 78'	Stadium: Luminus Arena; Referee: Lothar D'hondt

19 August 2019 4	Zulte Waregem	3–1	Charleroi	Waregem
20:30 CEST (UTC+2)	De fauw 31' (pen.); Berahino 48'; Oberlin 90+1'		Morioka 65'	Stadium: Regenboogstadion; Referee: Alexandre Boucaut

24 August 2019 5	Sint-Truiden	0–0	Zulte Waregem	Sint-Truiden
20:30 CEST (UTC+2)				Stadium: Stayen

1 September 2019 6	Zulte Waregem	2–0	Antwerp	Waregem
20:30 CEST (UTC+2)				Stadium: Regenboogstadion

14 September 2019 7	Eupen	1–1	Zulte Waregem	Eupen
20:00 CEST (UTC+2)	Bautista 64'		Pletinckx (red card) 42'; Larin 45+4'	Stadium: Kehrwegstadion; Referee: Alexandre Boucaut

22 September 2019 8	Zulte Waregem	2–2	Gent	Waregem
20:00 CEST (UTC+2)	Seck 12'; Larin 68'; Bürki (yellow card) 90+2'	Report	Yaremchuk 34', 76'; Asare (yellow card) 45+1'; Odjidja-Ofoe (red card) 83'	Stadium: Regenboogstadion; Attendance: 8,237; Referee: Wim Smet

28 September 2019 9	Excel Mouscron	2–2	Zulte Waregem	Mouscron
20:30 CEST (UTC+2)				Stadium: Stade Le Canonnier

5 October 2019 10	Zulte Waregem	6–0	Cercle Brugge	Waregem
20:30 CEST (UTC+2)	Larin 13', 90+1'; Bruno 24', 73'; Taravel 75' (o.g.); Berahino 85'			Stadium: Regenboogstadion

19 October 2019 11	Kortrijk	2–0	Zulte Waregem	Kortrijk
20:30 CET (UTC+1)				Stadium: Guldensporen Stadion

26 October 2019 12	Zulte Waregem	2–0	Oostende	Waregem
20:30 CEST (UTC+2)				Stadium: Regenboogstadion

30 October 2019 13	Zulte Waregem	0–2	Club Brugge	Waregem
14:30 CET (UTC+1)				Stadium: Regenboogstadion

2 November 2019 14	Waasland-Beveren	1–2	Zulte Waregem	Beveren
20:30 CEST (UTC+2)				Stadium: Freethiel Stadion

8 November 2019 15	Zulte Waregem	1–2	Anderlecht	Waregem
20:30 CEST (UTC+2)				Stadium: Regenboogstadion

23 November 2019 16	Mechelen	0–2	Zulte Waregem	Mechelen
20:30 CEST (UTC+2)				Stadium: Achter de Kazerne

30 November 2019 17	Zulte Waregem	1–0	Eupen	Waregem
20:00 CET (UTC+1)	Bruno 23'			Stadium: Regenboogstadion; Referee: Bert Put

7 December 2019 18	Gent	2–0	Zulte Waregem	Ghent
20:00 CET (UTC+1)	Bezus 2', (yellow card) 40'; Yaremchuk 28'; Owusu (yellow card) 38'	Report	Marcq (yellow card) 54'	Stadium: Ghelamco Arena; Referee: Jonathan Lardot

14 December 2019 19	Zulte Waregem	5–1	Sint-Truiden	Waregem
20:30 CET (UTC+1)				Stadium: Regenboogstadion

21 December 2019 20	Cercle Brugge	2–0	Zulte Waregem	Bruges
20:00 CET (UTC+1)	Foster 35'; Gory 90+4'			Stadium: Jan Breydel Stadium

26 December 2019 21	Club Brugge	4–0	Zulte Waregem	Bruges
14:30 CEST (UTC+2)				Stadium: Jan Breydel Stadium

19 January 2020 22	Zulte Waregem	0–3	Genk	Waregem
20:00 CET (UTC+1)		Report	Thorstvedt 23'; Mæhle (yellow card) 50'; Ito 55'; Bongonda 63', (yellow card) 70'	Stadium: Regenboogstadion; Referee: Alexandre Boucaut

26 January 2020 23	Antwerp	2–1	Zulte Waregem	Antwerp
20:30 CET (UTC+1)				Stadium: Bosuilstadion

2 February 2020 24	Zulte Waregem	5–0	Waasland-Beveren	Waregem
20:30 CET (UTC+1)				Stadium: Regenboogstadion

8 February 2020 25	Charleroi	4–0	Zulte Waregem	Charleroi
20:30 CET (UTC+1)				Stadium: Stade du Pays de Charleroi

16 February 2020 26	Zulte Waregem	1–2	Excel Mouscron	Waregem
20:00 CET (UTC+1)				Stadium: Regenboogstadion

22 February 2020 27	Oostende	1–1	Zulte Waregem	Ostend
20:00 CET (UTC+1)				Stadium: Versluys Arena

29 February 2020 28	Zulte Waregem	2–2	Kortrijk	Waregem
20:00 CET (UTC+1)				Stadium: Regenboogstadion

7 March 2020 29	Anderlecht	7–0	Zulte Waregem	Anderlecht
20:00 CET (UTC+1)				Stadium: Constant Vanden Stock Stadium

15 March 2020 30	Zulte Waregem	Cancelled	Standard Liège	Waregem
18:00 CET (UTC+1)				Stadium: Regenboogstadion
Note: The match was cancelled due to the COVID-19 pandemic.

=== Belgian Cup ===
25 September 2019 Sixth round	Zulte Waregem	4–2	Duffel	Waregem
20:00 CEST	Govea 44'; Bruno 59', 81'; Larin 71'	report	Verlinden 5'; Cobos Copado 86' (pen.)	Stadium: Regenboogstadion

4 December 2019 Seventh round	Zulte Waregem	3–0	Sint-Truiden	Waregem
20:00 CET	Govea 14', 56'; Bruno 72'	report		Stadium: Regenboogstadion

17 December 2019 Quarter-finals	Zulte Waregem	2–0	Charleroi	Waregem
20:45 CET	Berahino 48'; Larin 90+3'	report		Stadium: Regenboogstadion; Referee: Jan Boterberg

22 January 2020 Semi-finals; First leg	Club Brugge	1–1	Zulte Waregem	Bruges
20:45 CET	Rits 54'	report	Berahino 60'	Stadium: Jan Breydel Stadium; Referee: Wesley Alen

5 February 2020 Semi-finals; Second leg	Zulte Waregem	1–2	Club Brugge	Waregem
20:45 CET	Oberlin 78'	report	Mechele 54'; De Ketelaere 87'	Stadium: Regenboogstadion; Referee: Alexandre Boucaut
