= 2022–23 SV Zulte Waregem season =

S.V. Zulte Waregem
2022–23 season
- Chairman: Willy Naessens
- Manager: Mbaye Leye (until 15 March); Frederik D’Hollander and Davy De fauw (from 15 March)
- Stadium: Elindus Arena
- Belgian Pro League: 17th (relegated)
- Belgian Cup: Semi-finals

The 2022–23 S.V. Zulte Waregem season was the club's 22nd season in existence and the 18th consecutive season in the top flight of Belgian football. The club finished 17th in the league and was relegated to the Challenger Pro League.

In addition to the domestic league, Zulte Waregem participated in this season's edition of the Belgian Cup, reaching the semi-finals. The season covers the period from 1 July 2022 to 30 June 2023.

== Players ==
=== First-team squad ===
As of 18 August 2022

Note: Flags indicate national team as defined under FIFA eligibility rules; some limited exceptions apply. Players may hold more than one non-FIFA nationality.

No.	Pos.	Nation	Player
1	GK	BEL	Sammy Bossut
2	DF	CGO	Ravy Tsouka
3	DF	ESP	Borja López
4	DF	BEL	Timothy Derijck
5	DF	UKR	Oleksandr Drambayev (on loan from Shakhtar Donetsk)
6	MF	FRA	Abdoulaye Sissako
7	MF	GAM	Alieu Fadera
9	FW	BEL	Jelle Vossen
10	MF	MLI	Mamadou Sangare (on loan from Red Bull Salzburg)
11	FW	SEN	Alioune Ndour
12	MF	BEL	Christian Brüls
14	DF	BEL	Alessandro Ciranni
15	MF	BEL	Wout De Buyser
16	MF	EST	Kevor Palumets
17	MF	SEN	Pape Diop

No.	Pos.	Nation	Player
18	DF	SEN	Modou Tambedou
19	FW	BEL	Youssuf Sylla
20	MF	BEL	Nicolas Rommens
22	DF	NOR	Bent Sørmo
23	MF	ESP	Dani Ramírez
25	GK	BEL	Louis Bostyn
26	MF	TAN	Novatus Dismas
27	FW	NGR	Chinonso Offor (on loan from CF Montréal)
30	GK	BEL	Sef Van Damme
31	DF	BEL	Lukas Willen
33	GK	BEL	Martijn Beernaert
34	FW	BEL	Stan Braem
35	FW	BEL	Lennert Hallaert
71	DF	BEL	Cheick Thiam
93	FW	GBS	Zinho Gano

== Transfers ==
=== In ===
Pos	Player	Transferred from	Fee	Date	Source
DF	(Spain) Borja López	(Spain) Sporting Gijón		15 June 2022	
MF	Nicolas Rommens	RWDM		16 June 2022	
DF	(Ukraine) Oleksandr Drambayev	(Ukraine) Shakhtar Donetsk	Loan	16 June 2022	
FW	Stan Braem	Unattached	Free	18 June 2022	
MF	(Mali) Mamadou Sangare	(Austria) Red Bull Salzburg	Loan	22 June 2022	
MF	(Tanzania) Novatus Miroshi	(Israel) Maccabi Tel Aviv		28 June 2022	
DF	(Senegal) Modou Tambedou	Unattached	Free	14 July 2022	
DF	(Republic of the Congo) Ravy Tsouka	(Sweden) Helsingborg		29 July 2022	
MF	(Spain) Dani Ramírez	(Poland) Lech Poznań		1 August 2022	
MF	(Estonia) Kevor Palumets	(Estonia) Paide Linnameeskond		5 September 2022	
FW	(Nigeria) Chinonso Offor	(Canada) Montréal	Loan	5 September 2022	
MF	(Senegal) Pape Diop	Unattached	Free	5 September 2022	
FW	(Senegal) Alioune Ndour	(Norway) Haugesund		6 September 2022	

=== Out ===
Pos	Player	Transferred to	Fee	Date	Source
DF	Dion De Neve	Kortrijk	Free	4 April 2022	
DF	Ewoud Pletinckx	OH Leuven	Undisclosed	17 June 2022	
DF	(England) Cameron Humphreys	(England) Rotherham United	Free	5 July 2022	
DF	Laurens De Bock	(Greece) Atromitos	Free	30 July 2022	
MF	David Hubert	RSCA Futures	Undisclosed	13 August 2022	
MF	(France) Jean-Luc Dompé	(Germany) Hamburger SV	Undisclosed	18 August 2022	
MF	Mathieu De Smet	(Netherlands) HSV Hoek	Undisclosed	7 September 2022	
MF	(Mexico) Omar Govea	Unattached	Free	7 September 2022	
MF	(Senegal) Ibrahima Seck	Unattached	Free	7 September 2022	
MF	(Tunisia) Bassem Srarfi	Unattached	Free	7 September 2022	
MF	(Cameroon) Frank Boya	Antwerp	End of loan	7 September 2022	
MF	(Switzerland) Dereck Kutesa	(France) Reims	End of loan	7 September 2022	
MF	(Ivory Coast) Idrissa Doumbia	(Portugal) Sporting CP	End of loan	7 September 2022	
DF	(Malaysia) Dion Cools	(Denmark) Midtjylland	End of loan	7 September 2022	

== Pre-season and friendlies ==
Win Draw Loss Fixtures

18 June 2022	Oudenaarde (Belgium)	0–5	(Belgium) Zulte Waregem	Oudenaarde, Belgium
17:00 CEST (UTC+2)		Report		Stadium: Burgemeester Thienpontstadion

22 June 2022	Harelbeke (Belgium)	0–3	(Belgium) Zulte Waregem	Harelbeke, Belgium
18:00 CEST (UTC+2)		Report		Stadium: Stedelijk Forestiersstadion

25 June 2022	Sparta Petegem (Belgium)	0–7	(Belgium) Zulte Waregem	Petegem-aan-de-Leie, Belgium
18:00 CEST (UTC+2)		Report		Stadium: Terrein KFC Sparta Petegem

29 June 2022	Zulte Waregem (Belgium)	1–1	(Belgium) Charleroi	Ingelmunster, Belgium
18:00 CEST (UTC+2)	Vossen 55' (pen.)	Report	Morioka 3'	Stadium: OMS Ingelmunster Stadion

2 July 2022	Zulte Waregem (Belgium)	–	(Belgium) Deinze	Ingelmunster, Belgium
16:30 CEST (UTC+2)		Source		Stadium: OMS Ingelmunster Stadion

3 July 2022	Tubize (Belgium)	0–4	(Belgium) Zulte Waregem	Tubize, Belgium
16:00 CEST (UTC+2)		Report		Stadium: Stade Leburton

9 July 2022	Oostende (Belgium)	3–1	(Belgium) Zulte Waregem	Ingelmunster, Belgium
15:00	Katelaris 29'; Biron 47', 84'	Report	Demuynck 86'	Stadium: OMS Ingelmunster Stadion; Referee: Butterberg

16 July 2022	Zulte Waregem (Belgium)	1–1	(France) Valenciennes	Waregem, Belgium
16:00		Report		Stadium: Elindus Arena

7 December 2022	Ronse (Belgium)	0–3	(Belgium) Zulte Waregem	Ronse, Belgium
18:00		Report		Stadium: Orphale Cruckestadion

== Competitions ==
=== Overview ===
Competition	First match	Last match	Starting round	Final position	Record							
Competition	First match	Last match	Starting round	Final position	Pld	W	D	L	GF	GA	GD	Win %
Belgian Pro League	23 July 2022	23 April 2023	Matchday 1	17th	34	6	9	19	50	78	−28	17.65
Belgian Cup	9 November 2022	28 February 2023	Sixth round	Semi-finals	5	3	0	2	6	4	+2	60.00
Total					39	9	9	21	56	82	−26	23.08

Last updated: 23 April 2023
Source: Soccerway

=== Belgian Pro League ===
==== League table ====
Pos	Team	Pld	W	D	L	GF	GA	GD	Pts	Qualification or relegation
14	Kortrijk	34	8	7	19	37	61	−24	31	
15	Eupen	34	7	7	20	40	75	−35	28	
16	Oostende (R)	34	7	6	21	37	76	−39	27	Relegation to Challenger Pro League
17	Zulte Waregem (R)	34	6	9	19	50	78	−28	27	Relegation to Challenger Pro League
18	Seraing (R)	34	5	5	24	28	68	−40	20	Relegation to Challenger Pro League

Source: Jupiler Pro League (in Dutch), Soccerway
Rules for classification: 1) Points; 2) Matches won; 3) Goal difference; 4) Goals scored; 5) Away matches won; 6) Away goal difference; 7) Away goals scored; 8) Play-off.
(R) Relegated

==== Results summary ====
Overall								Home						Away					
Pld	W	D	L	GF	GA	GD	Pts	W	D	L	GF	GA	GD	W	D	L	GF	GA	GD
34	6	9	19	50	78	−28	27	3	4	10	27	46	−19	3	5	9	23	32	−9

Last updated: 23 April 2023.
Source: Jupiler Pro League

==== Results by round ====
Round	1	2	3	4	5	6	7	8	9	10	11	12	13	14	15	16	17	18	19	20	21	22	23	24	25	26	27	28	29	30	31	32	33	34
Ground	H	A	A	H	H	A	H	A	H	A	H	A	H	A	H	A	H	A	H	A	A	H	H	A	H	A	H	A	H	A	H	A	A	H
Result	W	L	D	L	L	D	L	L	L	L	L	W	W	L	L	D	D	L	W	L	W	D	L	L	D	D	D	L	L	D	L	L	W	L
Position																																		17

Updated to match(es) played on 23 April 2023. Source: Jupiler Pro League
A = Away; H = Home; W = Win; D = Draw; L = Loss

==== Matches ====
The league fixtures were announced on 22 June 2022.

23 July 2022 1	Zulte Waregem	2–0	Seraing	Waregem
18:15	Fadera 74'; López 87'	Report		Stadium: Elindus Arena; Referee: Bert Put

31 July 2022 2	Antwerp	1–0	Zulte Waregem	Antwerp
21:00	Balikwisha 68'	Report		Stadium: Bosuilstadion; Referee: Lothar D'hondt

5 August 2022 3	Club Brugge	1–1	Zulte Waregem	Bruges
20:45 CEST	Skov Olsen 47'	Report	Drambayev 69'	Stadium: Jan Breydel Stadium; Referee: Nathan Verboomen

14 August 2022 4	Zulte Waregem	1–4	Genk	Waregem
21:00 CEST	Vossen 43'	Report	Heynen 9' (pen.), 44'; Németh 25'; Muñoz 52'	Stadium: Elindus Arena; Attendance: 7,006; Referee: Lawrence Visser

21 August 2022 5	Zulte Waregem	1–3	Charleroi	Waregem
16:00 CEST	Fadera 5'	Report	Heymans 36'; Kayembe 83'; Zaroury 89'	Stadium: Elindus Arena; Referee: Erik Lambrechts

27 August 2022 6	Cercle Brugge	1–1	Zulte Waregem	Bruges
18:15 CEST	Ueda 11'	Report	Rommens 16'	Stadium: Jan Breydel Stadium; Referee: Bram Van Driessche

4 September 2022 7	Zulte Waregem	1–3	Union SG	Waregem
21:00 CEST (UTC+2)	Braem 90+1'	Report	Teuma 38'; Tambedou 70' (o.g.); Eckert 86'	Stadium: Regenboogstadion; Attendance: 5,592; Referee: Arthur Denil

11 September 2022 8	Gent	2–0	Zulte Waregem	Ghent
21:00 CEST (UTC+2)	Cuypers 49'; Torunarigha 72'	Report		Stadium: Ghelamco Arena; Referee: Jan Boterberg

17 September 2022 9	Zulte Waregem	0–3	Sint-Truiden	Waregem
18:15		Report	Bruno 1', 58' (pen.); Okazaki 50'	Stadium: Elindus Arena; Referee: Brent Staessens

1 October 2022 10	Westerlo	2–0	Zulte Waregem	Westerlo
18:15	Chadli 9'; Foster 47'	Report		Stadium: Het Kuipje; Referee: Alexandre Boucaut

8 October 2022 11	Zulte Waregem	2–5	OH Leuven	Waregem
18:15	Vossen 40'; De Norre 74' (o.g.)	Report	González 51', 65', 90+1'; Kiyine 58'; De Norre 77'	Stadium: Elindus Arena; Referee: Wesli De Cremer

15 October 2022 12	Kortrijk	1–3	Zulte Waregem	Kortrijk
16:00	Keïta 25'	Report	Tambedou 60'; Offor 65'; Gano 87' (pen.)	Stadium: Guldensporen Stadion; Referee: Bert Put

20 October 2022 13	Zulte Waregem	3–2	Anderlecht	Waregem
20:45	Vossen 5'; Sissako 80'; Gano 90+5'	Report	Silva 41' (pen.); Diawara 58'	Stadium: Elindus Arena; Referee: Nicolas Laforge

23 October 2022 14	Oostende	2–1	Zulte Waregem	Ostend
21:00	Boonen 45+1'; Atanga 80'	Report	Vossen 70'	Stadium: Diaz Arena; Referee: Jan Boterberg

29 October 2022 15	Zulte Waregem	0–3	Standard Liège	Waregem
16:00 CET (UTC+1)		Report	Dussenne 80' (pen.); Perica 87', 90+6'	Stadium: Elindus Arena; Attendance: 7,634; Referee: Jonathan Lardot

5 November 2022 16	Mechelen	2–2	Zulte Waregem	Mechelen
16:00 CEST	Verstraete 16'; Miroshi 41' (o.g.)	Report	Sangare 54'; Vossen 62' (pen.)	Stadium: Achter de Kazerne; Referee: Kevinv Van Damme

12 November 2022 17	Zulte Waregem	5–5	Eupen	Waregem
18:15 CEST	Gano 39', 45+3' (pen.); Braem 83'; Offor 84'; Fadera 88'	Report	N'Dri 9'; Charles-Cook 20'; Nuhu 41'; Lambert 56'; Soumano 90+4'	Stadium: Elindus Arena; Referee: Nathan Verboomen

27 December 2022 18	Sint-Truiden	2–0	Zulte Waregem	Sint-Truiden
20:00	Hayashi 28'; Bruno 70'	Report		Stadium: Stayen; Referee: Jonathan Lardot

8 January 2023 19	Zulte Waregem	2–0	Mechelen	Waregem
16:00	Rommens 5'; Gano 73' (pen.)	Report		Stadium: Elindus Arena; Referee: Bert Put

14 January 2023 20	Genk	1–0	Zulte Waregem	Genk
21:45 CEST	Sor 10'	Report		Stadium: Cegeka Arena; Referee: Lothar D'hondt

18 January 2023 21	Anderlecht	2–3	Zulte Waregem	Anderlecht
20:45	Raman 35', 36'	Report	Gano 11'; Ndour 62'; Fadera 75'	Stadium: Lotto Park; Referee: Wesli De Cremer

21 January 2023 22	Zulte Waregem	1–1	Westerlo	Waregem
16:00	Vossen 72'	Report	Neustädter 9'	Stadium: Elindus Arena; Referee: Bram Van Driessche

29 January 2023 23	Zulte Waregem	1–2	Club Brugge	Waregem
18:30	Ndour 32'	Report	Lang 7'; Vanaken 45+6'	Stadium: Elindus Arena; Referee: Kevin Van Damme

5 February 2023 24	Union SG	4–0	Zulte Waregem	Forest
19:15	Puertas 9'; Boniface 55'; Nilsson 79'; Teuma 89'	Report		Stadium: Joseph Marien Stadium; Referee: Wim Smet

12 February 2023 25	Zulte Waregem	1–1	Oostende	Waregem
19:15	Gano 5'	Report	Hornby 75'	Stadium: Elindus Arena; Referee: Nicolas Laforge

18 February 2023 26	Seraing	1–1	Zulte Waregem	Seraing
18:15	Poaty 86'	Report	Vossen 43' (pen.)	Stadium: Stade du Pairay; Referee: Kevin Van Damme

24 February 2023 27	Zulte Waregem	3–3	Kortrijk	Waregem
20:45	Ciranni 30'; Ndour 49'; Gano 83'	Report	Kadri 15'; Selemani 44'; Avenatti 65'	Stadium: Elindus Arena; Referee: Lawrence Visser

4 March 2023 28	OH Leuven	4–2	Zulte Waregem	Leuven
18:15 CEST (UTC+2)	Schrijvers 29'; Þorsteinsson 41', 76' (pen.); De Norre 45'	Report	Vossen 73' (pen.); Gano 82'	Stadium: Den Dreef; Referee: Alexandre Boucaut

12 March 2023 29	Zulte Waregem	2–6	Gent	Waregem
16:00 CEST (UTC+2)	Derijck 52'; Vossen 65'	Report	De Sart 37'; Castro-Montes 41'; Orban 53', 68', 75', 83'	Stadium: Elindus Arena; Referee: Jonathan Lardot

18 March 2023 30	Standard Liège	2–2	Zulte Waregem	Liège
20:45	Fossey 14'; Dussenne 39'	Report	Fadera 76'; Ndour 85'	Stadium: Stade Maurice Dufrasne; Referee: Jan Boterberg

31 March 2023 31	Zulte Waregem	0–2	Antwerp	Waregem
20:45 CEST (UTC+2)		Report	Alderweireld 85', 89' (pen.)	Stadium: Elindus Arena; Referee: Bert Put

8 April 2023 32	Charleroi	3–2	Zulte Waregem	Charleroi
18:15 CEST	Bayo 66'; Mbenza 73'; Marcq 90+6'	Report	Ndour 27'; Fadera 80'	Stadium: Stade du Pays de Charleroi; Referee: Nathan Verboomen

15 April 2023 33	Eupen	1–5	Zulte Waregem	Eupen
16:00 CEST	Prevljak 46'	Report	Fila 5'; Gano 28', 39', 45+2'; Vormer 79'	Stadium: Kehrwegstadion; Referee: Jasper Vergoote

23 April 2023 34	Zulte Waregem	2–3	Cercle Brugge	Waregem
18:30 CEST	Willen 59'; Ndour 68'	Report	Siquet 6'; Ueda 8'; Somers 83'	Stadium: Elindus Arena; Referee: Erik Lambrechts

=== Belgian Cup ===
9 November 2022 Sixth round	Lommel	0–1	Zulte Waregem	Lommel
20:00 CET		Report	Gano 70'	Stadium: Soevereinstadion; Referee: Ken Vermeiren

21 December 2022 Seventh round	Deinze	1–2	Zulte Waregem	Deinze
20:00 CET	Balaj 49'	Report	Ndour 86', 88'	Stadium: Dakota Arena; Referee: Wesli De Cremer

11 January 2023 Quarter-final	Zulte Waregem	2–0	Sint-Truiden	Waregem
20:00 CET	Fadera 42'; Vormer 63'	Report		Stadium: Elindus Arena; Referee: Alexandre Boucaut

2 February 2023 Semi-final first leg	Zulte Waregem	1–2	Mechelen	Waregem
20:45 CET	Fadera 2'	Report	Storm 24'; Mrabti 50'	Stadium: Elindus Arena; Referee: Nathan Verboomen

28 February 2023 Semi-final second leg	Mechelen	1–0 (3–1 agg.)	Zulte Waregem	Mechelen
20:45 CET	Bates 74'	Report		Stadium: Achter de Kazerne; Referee: Bram Van Driessche
