= 2021–22 SV Zulte Waregem season =

S.V. Zulte Waregem
2021–22 season
- Chairman: Willy Naessens
- Manager: Francky Dury
- Stadium: Regenboogstadion
- Belgian First Division A: 16th
- Belgian Cup: Pre-season
- Top goalscorer: League: Jelle Vossen (7); All: Jelle Vossen (7)
- All statistics correct as of 9 February 2022.

The 2021–22 season is the 21st season in the existence of S.V. Zulte Waregem and the club's 17th consecutive season in the top flight of Belgian football. In addition to the domestic league, S.V. Zulte Waregem will participate in this season's edition of the Belgian Cup.

== Players ==
=== First-team squad ===
As of 7 July 2021

Note: Flags indicate national team as defined under FIFA eligibility rules; some limited exceptions apply. Players may hold more than one non-FIFA nationality.

No.	Pos.	Nation	Player
1	GK	BEL	Sammy Bossut
4	DF	GHA	Daniel Opare
5	MF	FRA	Damien Marcq
6	MF	FRA	Abdoulaye Sissako
9	FW	BEL	Jelle Vossen
10	MF	MEX	Omar Govea
11	MF	TUN	Bassem Srarfi
13	DF	BEL	Alessandro Ciranni
15	FW	CZE	Tomáš Chorý (on loan from Viktoria Plzeň)
17	MF	FRA	Jean-Luc Dompé
21	MF	SEN	Ibrahima Seck
22	MF	NOR	Bent Sørmo

No.	Pos.	Nation	Player
23	MF	AUS	Panagiotis Armenakas
24	DF	BEL	Ewoud Pletinckx
25	GK	BEL	Louis Bostyn
27	DF	BEL	Laurens De Bock (on loan from Leeds United)
29	MF	BEL	Mathieu De Smet
31	DF	COM	Abdallah Ali Mohamed (on loan from Marseille)
33	DF	ENG	Cameron Humphreys
43	DF	GRE	Nikos Kenourgios
44	GK	GER	Eike Bansen
80	FW	BEL	Youssuf Sylla
93	FW	GBS	Zinho Gano

=== On loan ===
Note: Flags indicate national team as defined under FIFA eligibility rules; some limited exceptions apply. Players may hold more than one non-FIFA nationality.

No.	Pos.	Nation	Player
—	FW	BDI	Saido Berahino (at RSC Charleroi until 30 June 2021)
—	FW	NED	Robert Mühren (at SC Cambuur until 30 June 2021)

== Pre-season and friendlies ==
Win Draw Loss Fixtures

23 June 2021 Friendly	Oudenaarde (Belgium)	2–4	(Belgium) Zulte Waregem	Belgium
19:00 CEST (UTC+2)

26 June 2021 Friendly	Zulte Waregem (Belgium)	0–4	(Belgium) Union SG	Belgium
16:00 CEST (UTC+2)

2 July 2021 Friendly	Zulte Waregem (Belgium)	1–2	(Belgium) Cercle Brugge	Waregem, Belgium
18:00 CEST (UTC+2)				Stadium: Regenboogstadion

7 July 2021 Friendly	Club Brugge (Belgium)	2–1	(Belgium) Zulte Waregem	Belgium
18:00 CEST (UTC+2)

10 July 2021 Friendly	Zulte Waregem (Belgium)	3–2	(Belgium) Charleroi	Belgium
15:00 CEST (UTC+2)

14 July 2021 Friendly	Deinze (Belgium)	1–3	(Belgium) Zulte Waregem	Belgium
19:00 CEST (UTC+2)

17 July 2021 Friendly	Zulte Waregem (Belgium)	0–0	(Netherlands) FC Utrecht	Waregem, Belgium
14:30 CEST (UTC+2)			Warmerdam (yellow card)	Stadium: Regenboogstadion; Attendance: 3,000

7 October 2021 Friendly	Oostende (Belgium)	5–2	(Belgium) Zulte Waregem	Ostend, Belgium
11:00 CEST (UTC+2)		Report		Stadium: Diaz Arena

9 January 2022 Friendly	Anderlecht (Belgium)	3–0	(Belgium) Zulte Waregem	Brussels, Belgium
13:30 CET (UTC+1)		Report		Stadium: Complexe Sportif Neerpede

28 April 2022 Friendly	Oostende (Belgium)	5–3	(Belgium) Zulte Waregem	Ostend, Belgium
13:00 CEST (UTC+2)				Stadium: Diaz Arena

== Competitions ==
=== Overall record ===
Competition	First match	Last match	Starting round	Final position	Record							
Competition	First match	Last match	Starting round	Final position	Pld	W	D	L	GF	GA	GD	Win %
First Division A	24 July 2021	May 2022	Matchday 1		26	6	8	12	36	54	−18	23.08
Belgian Cup	26 October 2021	1 December 2021	Sixth round	Seventh round	2	1	0	1	4	4	+0	50.00
Total					28	7	8	13	40	58	−18	25.00

Last updated: 9 February 2022
Source: Soccerway

=== First Division A ===
==== League table ====
Pos	Team	Pld	W	D	L	GF	GA	GD	Pts	Qualification or relegation
14	Standard Liège	34	9	9	16	32	51	−19	36	
15	Eupen	34	8	8	18	37	61	−24	32	
16	Zulte Waregem	34	8	8	18	42	69	−27	32	
17	Seraing (O)	34	8	4	22	30	68	−38	28	Qualification for the Relegation play-off
18	Beerschot (R)	34	4	4	26	33	76	−43	16	Relegation to First Division B

Source: Jupiler Pro League (in Dutch), Soccerway
Rules for classification: 1) Points; 2) Matches won; 3) Goal difference; 4) Goals scored; 5) Away matches won; 6) Away goal difference; 7) Away goals scored; 8) Play-off.
(O) Play-off winners; (R) Relegated

==== Results summary ====
Overall								Home						Away					
Pld	W	D	L	GF	GA	GD	Pts	W	D	L	GF	GA	GD	W	D	L	GF	GA	GD
1	0	1	0	1	1	0	1	0	0	0	0	0	0	0	1	0	1	1	0

Last updated: 24 July 2021.
Source: Jupiler Pro League

==== Results by round ====
Round	1	2
Ground	A	H
Result	D	
Position	12	

Updated to match(es) played on 24 July 2021. Source: Jupiler Pro League
A = Away; H = Home; W = Win; D = Draw; L = Loss

==== Matches ====
The league fixtures were announced on 8 June 2021.

1 August 2021 2	Zulte Waregem	1–2	Standard Liège	Waregem
16:00 CEST (UTC+2)				Stadium: Regenboogstadion

15 August 2021 4	Zulte Waregem	0–4	Club Brugge	Waregem
21:00 CEST (UTC+2)		Report	Lang 42'; Vormer 65'; Vanaken 69'; De Ketelaere 75'	Stadium: Regenboogstadion; Attendance: 4,580; Referee: Lawrence Visser

22 August 2021 5	Zulte Waregem	2–2	Charleroi	Waregem
16:00 CEST (UTC+2)				Stadium: Regenboogstadion

11 September 2021 7	Zulte Waregem	2–4	Cercle Brugge	Waregem
18:30 CEST (UTC+2)				Stadium: Regenboogstadion

16 October 2021 11	Zulte Waregem	2–1	Antwerp	Waregem
18:30 CEST (UTC+2)	Gano 59', (yellow card) 73'; Kutesa 66'; Fadera (yellow card) 90+4'	Report	Benson 19'; Yusuf (yellow card) 29'; Miyoshi (yellow card) 90+2'	Stadium: Regenboogstadion; Attendance: 7,182; Referee: Jonathan Lardot

31 October 2021 13	Zulte Waregem	2–6	Genk	Waregem
13:30 CET (UTC+1)				Stadium: Regenboogstadion

6 November 2021 14	Eupen	1–1	Zulte Waregem	Eupen
16:15 CET (UTC+1)	Nuhu 40'		Vossen 35' (pen.)	Stadium: Kehrwegstadion

20 November 2021 15	Zulte Waregem	1–2	Gent	Waregem
18:30 CET (UTC+1)				Stadium: Regenboogstadion

28 November 2021 16	Zulte Waregem	2–0	Beerschot	Waregem
16:00 CET (UTC+1)				Stadium: Regenboogstadion

12 December 2021 18	Club Brugge	3–0	Zulte Waregem	Bruges
21:00 CET (UTC+1)				Stadium: Jan Breydel Stadium

23 January 2022 23	Cercle Brugge	3–1	Zulte Waregem	Bruges
21:00 CET (UTC+1)				Stadium: Jan Breydel Stadium

29 January 2022 25	Beerschot	3–3	Zulte Waregem	Antwerp
16:30 CET (UTC+1)				Stadium: Olympic Stadium

6 February 2022 26	Genk	2–0	Zulte Waregem	Genk
21:00 CET (UTC+1)				Stadium: Luminus Arena

6 March 2022 30	Gent	v	Zulte Waregem	Ghent
21:00 CET (UTC+1)				Stadium: Ghelamco Arena

12 March 2022 31	Zulte Waregem	v	Eupen	Waregem
--:-- CET (UTC+1)				Stadium: Regenboogstadion

9 April 2022 34	Charleroi	v	Zulte Waregem	Charleroi
--:-- CEST (UTC+2)				Stadium: Stade du Pays de Charleroi
