= 2020–21 SV Zulte Waregem season =

Zulte Waregem
2020–21 season
- Chairman: Willy Naessens
- Manager: Francky Dury
- Stadium: Regenboogstadion
- Belgian First Division A: 10th
- Belgian Cup: Sixth round
- Top goalscorer: League: Gianni Bruno (20); All: Gianni Bruno (20)
| Home colours | Away colours |

The 2020–21 S.V. Zulte Waregem season was the club's 20th season in existence and the 16th consecutive season in the top flight of Belgian football. In addition to the domestic league, Zulte Waregem participated in this season's edition of the Belgian Cup. The season covered the period from 1 July 2020 to 30 June 2021.

== Players ==
=== First-team squad ===
As of 6 August 2020

Note: Flags indicate national team as defined under FIFA eligibility rules; some limited exceptions apply. Players may hold more than one non-FIFA nationality.

| No. | Pos. | Nation | Player |
|---|---|---|---|
| 1 | GK | BEL | Sammy Bossut |
| 2 | DF | FRA | William Bianda (on loan from Roma) |
| 3 | DF | BEL | Olivier Deschacht |
| 4 | DF | GHA | Daniel Opare |
| 5 | MF | FRA | Damien Marcq |
| 6 | MF | FRA | Abdoulaye Sissako |
| 9 | FW | BEL | Jelle Vossen |
| 10 | MF | MEX | Omar Govea |
| 11 | MF | TUN | Bassem Srarfi |
| 15 | FW | CZE | Tomáš Chorý (on loan from Viktoria Plzeň) |
| 17 | MF | FRA | Jean-Luc Dompé |
| 19 | FW | BEL | Gianni Bruno |

| No. | Pos. | Nation | Player |
|---|---|---|---|
| 21 | MF | SEN | Ibrahima Seck |
| 23 | MF | AUS | Panagiotis Armenakas |
| 24 | DF | BEL | Ewoud Pletinckx |
| 25 | GK | BEL | Louis Bostyn |
| 27 | DF | BEL | Laurens De Bock (on loan from Leeds) |
| 29 | MF | BEL | Mathieu De Smet |
| 31 | DF | COM | Abdallah Ali Mohamed (on loan from Marseille) |
| 33 | DF | ENG | Cameron Humphreys |
| 43 | DF | GRE | Nikos Kenourgios |
| 44 | GK | GER | Eike Bansen |
| 67 | MF | BEL | Jannes Van Hecke |
| 80 | FW | BEL | Youssuf Sylla |

=== Out on loan ===
Note: Flags indicate national team as defined under FIFA eligibility rules; some limited exceptions apply. Players may hold more than one non-FIFA nationality.

| No. | Pos. | Nation | Player |
|---|---|---|---|
| — | FW | BDI | Saido Berahino (at RSC Charleroi until 30 June 2021) |
| — | FW | NED | Robert Mühren (at SC Cambuur until 30 June 2021) |

== Pre-season and friendlies ==
Win Draw Loss

| 4 July 2020 Friendly | Zulte Waregem (Belgium) | 2–2 | (Belgium) Cercle Brugge | Waregem, Belgium |
| 16:00 CEST (UTC+2) | | | | Stadium: Regenboogstadion |

| 7 July 2020 Friendly | Zulte Waregem (Belgium) | 1–2 | (Belgium) Charleroi | Waregem, Belgium |
| 16:00 CEST (UTC+2) | | | | Stadium: Regenboogstadion |

| 11 July 2020 Friendly | Zulte Waregem (Belgium) | 5–0 | (Belgium) Waasland-Beveren | Belgium |
| 16:00 CEST (UTC+2) | Bruno 28' (pen.); Berahino 45'; Vossen 61' (pen.); Sissako 78'; I. Sylla 80' |

| 18 July 2020 Friendly | Deinze (Belgium) | Cancelled | (Belgium) Zulte Waregem | Deinze, Belgium |
| 16:00 CEST (UTC+2) | | | | Stadium: Burgemeester Van de Wiele Stadion |

| 18 July 2020 Friendly | OH Leuven (Belgium) | 2–0 | (Belgium) Zulte Waregem | Liège, Belgium |
| 18:00 CEST (UTC+2) | | | | Stadium: Académie Robert Louis-Dreyfus |

| 21 July 2020 Friendly | Zulte Waregem (Belgium) | 1–3 | (Belgium) RWDM Brussels | Ingelmunster, Belgium |
| 16:00 CEST (UTC+2) | | | | Stadium: Gemeentelijk Sportstadion |

| 25 July 2020 Friendly | Zulte Waregem (Belgium) | 2–3 | (Belgium) Sint-Truiden | Waregem, Belgium |
| 16:00 CEST (UTC+2) | | | | Stadium: Regenboogstadion |

| 1 August 2020 Friendly | Zulte Waregem (Belgium) | 2–1 | (Belgium) Gent | Waregem, Belgium |
| 18:00 CEST (UTC+2) | Berahino 1'; Vossen 6'; Srarfi (red card) 31' | | Yaremchuk 53'; Odjidja-Ofoe (red card) 66' | Stadium: Regenboogstadion |

== Competitions ==
=== Overview ===
| Competition | First match | Last match | Starting round | Final position | Record | | | | | | | |
| Competition | First match | Last match | Starting round | Final position | Pld | W | D | L | GF | GA | GD | Win % |
|---|---|---|---|---|---|---|---|---|---|---|---|---|
| Belgian First Division A | 9 August 2020 | 18 April 2021 | Matchday 1 | 10th | 34 | 14 | 4 | 16 | 53 | 69 | −16 | 41.18 |
| Belgian Cup | 3 February 2021 | | Sixth round | Sixth round | 1 | 0 | 0 | 1 | 0 | 1 | −1 | 0.00 |
| Total | | | | | 35 | 14 | 4 | 17 | 53 | 70 | −17 | 40.00 |

Source: Soccerway

=== Belgian First Division A ===
==== League table ====
| Pos | Team | Pld | W | D | L | GF | GA | GD | Pts | Qualification or relegation |
|---|---|---|---|---|---|---|---|---|---|---|
| 8 | Mechelen | 34 | 13 | 9 | 12 | 54 | 54 | 0 | 48 | Qualification for the Play-offs II |
| 9 | Beerschot | 34 | 14 | 5 | 15 | 58 | 64 | −6 | 47 | |
| 10 | Zulte Waregem | 34 | 14 | 4 | 16 | 53 | 69 | −16 | 46 | |
| 11 | OH Leuven | 34 | 12 | 9 | 13 | 54 | 59 | −5 | 45 | |
| 12 | Eupen | 34 | 10 | 13 | 11 | 44 | 55 | −11 | 43 | |

Source: Jupiler Pro League (in Dutch), Soccerway
Rules for classification: 1) Points; 2) Matches won; 3) Goal difference; 4) Goals scored; 5) Away matches won; 6) Away goal difference; 7) Away goals scored; 8) Play-off.

==== Results summary ====
| Overall | | | | | | | | Home | | | | | | Away | | | | | |
| Pld | W | D | L | GF | GA | GD | Pts | W | D | L | GF | GA | GD | W | D | L | GF | GA | GD |
|---|---|---|---|---|---|---|---|---|---|---|---|---|---|---|---|---|---|---|---|
| 34 | 14 | 4 | 16 | 53 | 69 | −16 | 46 | 6 | 2 | 9 | 23 | 38 | −15 | 8 | 2 | 7 | 30 | 31 | −1 |

Source: Jupiler Pro League

==== Results by round ====
| Round | 1 | 2 | 3 | 4 | 5 | 6 | 7 | 8 | 9 | 10 | 11 | 12 | 13 | 14 | 15 | 16 | 17 | 18 | 19 | 20 | 21 | 22 | 23 | 24 | 25 | 26 | 27 | 28 | 29 | 30 | 31 | 32 | 33 | 34 |
|---|---|---|---|---|---|---|---|---|---|---|---|---|---|---|---|---|---|---|---|---|---|---|---|---|---|---|---|---|---|---|---|---|---|---|
| Ground | H | A | H | A | H | H | A | A | H | A | H | A | H | A | H | A | A | H | H | H | A | H | H | A | H | A | A | H | A | A | A | H | A | H |
| Result | L | L | W | W | L | L | D | L | L | L | D | W | L | W | D | W | W | L | W | W | W | L | L | L | W | D | W | W | W | L | L | W | L | L |
| Position | 15 | 18 | 12 | 9 | 9 | 14 | 14 | 15 | 15 | 16 | 15 | 14 | 15 | 14 | 14 | | | | | | | 9 | 11 | 12 | 11 | 11 | 10 | 8 | 8 | 8 | 8 | 6 | 8 | 10 |

Source: Jupiler Pro League
A = Away; H = Home; W = Win; D = Draw; L = Loss

==== Matches ====
The league fixtures were announced on 8 July 2020.

| 9 August 2020 1 | Zulte Waregem | 1–2 | Genk | Waregem |
| 16:00 CEST (UTC+2) | Deschacht 41'; De Bock (yellow card) 47'; Berahino (yellow card) 56'; Opare (yellow card) 67' | Report | Onuachu 73', (yellow card) 90+4'; Dessers 80' (pen.) | Stadium: Regenboogstadion; Attendance: 0 Referee: Erik Lambrechts |

| 16 August 2020 2 | Beerschot | 3–1 | Zulte Waregem | Antwerp |
| 16:00 CEST (UTC+2) | Tissoudali 32'; Sanusi (yellow card) 56'; Pietermaat (yellow card) 67'; Holzhauser 68', 87'; Eleke (yellow card) 90+2' | Report | Berahino 57'; Srarfi (yellow card) 64'; Govea (yellow card) 67' | Stadium: Olympisch Stadion; Attendance: 0 Referee: Bert Put |

| 22 August 2020 3 | Zulte Waregem | 4–1 | Waasland-Beveren | Waregem |
| 16:15 CEST (UTC+2) | Vossen 28'; Govea (yellow card) 41', (goal) 63'; Bruno 49' (pen.), 90+5'; Seck (yellow card) 84'; De Bock (yellow card) 90' | Report | Heymans 76'; Wuytens (yellow card) 86' | Stadium: Regenboogstadion; Attendance: 0 Referee: Lothar D'hondt |

| 29 August 2020 4 | Excel Mouscron | 0–1 | Zulte Waregem | Mouscron |
| 20:45 CEST (UTC+2) | Hočko (yellow card) 33'; Ciranni (yellow card) 58' | Report | Deschacht (yellow card) 70'; Seck 73' | Stadium: Stade Le Canonnier; Attendance: 0 Referee: Jasper Vergoote |

| 13 September 2020 5 | Zulte Waregem | 0–2 | Charleroi | Waregem |
| 18:15 CEST (UTC+2) | | Report | Rezaei 71'; Willems (yellow card) 84'; Nicholson 88' | Stadium: Regenboogstadion; Attendance: 3,498; Referee: Jan Boterberg |

| 20 September 2020 6 | Zulte Waregem | 0–6 | Club Brugge | Waregem |
| 13:30 CEST (UTC+2) | Humphreys (yellow card) 84' | Report | Deschacht 6' (o.g.); Krmenčík 19', 41'; Vanaken 31'; De Ketelaere 67'; Balanta 74'; Kossounou (yellow card) 81' | Stadium: Regenboogstadion; Attendance: 3,900; Referee: Nathan Verboomen |

| 27 September 2020 7 | Standard Liège | 2–2 | Zulte Waregem | Liège |
| 13:30 CEST (UTC+2) | Oularé (yellow card) 41'; Balikwisha 47'; Fai (yellow card) 60'; Muleka 81' | Report | Dompé 10'; Vossen 49', (yellow card) 81'; Marcq (yellow card) 71'; De Bock (yellow card) 77' | Stadium: Stade Maurice Dufrasne; Attendance: 6,578; Referee: Erik Lambrechts |

| 3 October 2020 8 | OH Leuven | 2–1 | Zulte Waregem | Leuven |
| 18:30 CEST (UTC+2) | Henry 19'; Sowah 63', (yellow card) 74' | Report | Berahino 70' | Stadium: Den Dreef; Attendance: 3,000; Referee: Alexandre Boucaut |

| 18 October 2020 9 | Zulte Waregem | 1–3 | Antwerp | Waregem |
| 13:30 CEST (UTC+2) | Dompé 7'; Seck (yellow card) 74' | Report | Haroun 57'; Hongla 64'; Refaelov (yellow card) 71'; Benavente 90+4' | Stadium: Regenboogstadion; Attendance: 3,230; Referee: Lothar D'hondt |

| 25 October 2020 10 | Oostende | 3–0 | Zulte Waregem | Ostend |
| 16:00 CET (UTC+1) | Vandendriessche 32'; D'Arpino 33'; Sakala 37' | Report | | Stadium: Versluys Arena; Attendance: 0 Referee: Bert Put |

| 2 November 2020 11 | Zulte Waregem | 1–1 | Kortrijk | Waregem |
| 20:45 CET (UTC+1) | Chorý 77', (yellow card) 88'; Opare (yellow card) 90+6'; Dompé (red card) 90+6' | Report | Mboyo 90+7' | Stadium: Regenboogstadion; Attendance: 0 Referee: Wesli De Cremer |

| 8 November 2020 12 | Cercle Brugge | 1–3 | Zulte Waregem | Bruges |
| 20:45 CET (UTC+1) | Musaba (yellow card) 30'; Hotić (yellow card) 43'; Ugbo 67'; Biancone (yellow card) 90+3' | Report | Chorý 6', (yellow card) 81'; Bruno 31', 78'; Bianda (yellow card) 39'; Srarfi (yellow card) 60' | Stadium: Jan Breydel Stadium; Attendance: 0 Referee: Jonathan Lardot |

| 22 November 2020 13 | Zulte Waregem | 1–2 | KV Mechelen | Waregem |
| 16:00 CET (UTC+1) | Bruno 54' | Report | Storm 40'; Hairemans 48'; Van Damme (yellow card) 86'; Kaya (yellow card) 87' | Stadium: Regenboogstadion; Attendance: 0 Referee: Christof Dierick |

| 29 November 2020 14 | Gent | 0–3 | Zulte Waregem | Ghent |
| 16:00 CET (UTC+1) | Ngadeu-Ngadjui (yellow card) 25' | Report | Govea 27'; Chorý 37'; De Bock (yellow card) 54'; Vossen 82' | Stadium: Ghelamco Arena; Attendance: 0 Referee: Alexandre Boucaut |

| 4 December 2020 15 | Zulte Waregem | 2–2 | Anderlecht | Waregem |
| 20:45 CET (UTC+1) | Seck 8'; Bruno 75'; Chorý (yellow card) 90+4' | Report | Murillo (yellow card) 30'; Nmecha 42'; Lokonga 65'; Amuzu (yellow card) 85' | Stadium: Regenboogstadion; Attendance: 0 Referee: Jan Boterberg |

| 16 December 2020 17 | Antwerp | 0–1 | Zulte Waregem | Antwerp |
| 18:45 CET (UTC+1) | De Sart (yellow card) 70'; Ampomah (yellow card) 85' | Report | Bruno 36'; Marcq (yellow card) 49'; De Bock (yellow card) 58'; Opare (yellow card) 72' | Stadium: Bosuilstadion; Attendance: 0 Referee: Lothar D'hondt |

| 19 December 2020 18 | Zulte Waregem | 0–2 | Sint-Truiden | Waregem |
| 18:30 CET (UTC+1) | | Report | Suzuki 56'; Caufriez 90+1' | Stadium: Regenboogstadion; Attendance: 0 Referee: Wesli De Cremer |

| 26 December 2020 19 | Zulte Waregem | 1–0 | Cercle Brugge | Waregem |
| 16:15 CET (UTC+1) | Dompé 83' | Report | | Stadium: Regenboogstadion; Attendance: 0 Referee: Christof Dierick |

| 29 December 2020 16 | Eupen | 2–3 | Zulte Waregem | Eupen |
| 20:45 CET (UTC+1) | Musona 34', 57'; Koch (yellow card) 60'; N'Dri (yellow card) 80'; Prevljak (yellow card) 86' | Report | Bruno (yellow card) 33', (goal) 82'; Seck (yellow card) 56'; Dompé 75'; Deschacht 84' | Stadium: Kehrwegstadion; Attendance: 0 Referee: Wim Smet |

| 9 January 2021 20 | Zulte Waregem | 1–0 | Excel Mouscron | Waregem |
| 16:15 CET (UTC+1) | | | | Stadium: Regenboogstadion; Attendance: 0 |

| 16 January 2021 21 | Waasland-Beveren | 1–5 | Zulte Waregem | Beveren |
| 18:30 CET (UTC+1) | | | | Stadium: Freethiel Stadion; Attendance: 0 |

| 21 January 2021 22 | Zulte Waregem | 2–3 | OH Leuven | Waregem |
| 18:45 CET (UTC+1) | Armenakas 28'; De Smet 42'; Seck (yellow card) 83' | Report | Mercier 44', 90+5' (pen.); Henry 75' | Stadium: Regenboogstadion; Attendance: 0 Referee: Jasper Vergoote |

| 24 January 2021 23 | Zulte Waregem | 0–3 | Beerschot | Waregem |
| 16:00 CET (UTC+1) | | Report | Van den Bergh 54'; Dom 75'; Prychynenko 90+1' (pen.) | Stadium: Regenboogstadion; Attendance: 0 Referee: Christof Dierick |

| 27 January 2021 24 | Genk | 3–2 | Zulte Waregem | Genk |
| 18:45 CET (UTC+1) | Onuachu 45+1', 52'; Ito 67' | Report | De Bock 72'; Bruno 88' (pen.) | Stadium: Luminus Arena; Attendance: 0 Referee: Alexandre Boucaut |

| 31 January 2021 25 | Zulte Waregem | 2–1 | Oostende | Waregem |
| 16:00 CET (UTC+1) | Bruno 38'; Deschacht (yellow card) 44'; Vossen 65' | Report | Sakala 14'; Theate (yellow card) 69' | Stadium: Regenboogstadion; Attendance: 0 Referee: Jan Boterberg |

| 7 February 2021 26 | Charleroi | 1–1 | Zulte Waregem | Charleroi |
| 16:00 CET (UTC+1) | Benchaib 1'; Descamps (yellow card) 89' | Report | Dompé (yellow card) 82'; Bruno 90+2' | Stadium: Stade du Pays de Charleroi; Attendance: 0 Referee: Wesli De Cremer |

| 13 February 2021 27 | Sint-Truiden | 1–2 | Zulte Waregem | Sint-Truiden |
| 18:30 CET (UTC+1) | | | | Stadium: Stayen; Attendance: 0 |

| 21 February 2021 28 | Zulte Waregem | 3–2 | Standard Liège | Waregem |
| 16:00 CET (UTC+1) | Dompé 15'; Bruno 56', 59' | Report | Klauss 11'; Bastien 53'; Tapsoba (yellow card) 90+1' | Stadium: Regenboogstadion; Attendance: 0 Referee: Wim Smet |

| 27 February 2021 29 | Kortrijk | 1–2 | Zulte Waregem | Kortrijk |
| 20:45 CET (UTC+1) | Palaversa 20'; Derijck (yellow card) 22' | Report | Bruno 23' (pen.), (yellow card) 62'; Marcq (yellow card) 52'; Chorý 65'; Vossen (yellow card) 67'; De Bock (yellow card) 77' | Stadium: Guldensporen Stadion; Attendance: 0 Referee: Jonathan Lardot |

| 7 March 2021 30 | Club Brugge | 3–0 | Zulte Waregem | Bruges |
| 16:00 CET (UTC+1) | Badji 21'; Sobol 37'; Lang 63' | Report | Govea (yellow card) 76' | Stadium: Jan Breydel Stadium; Attendance: 0 Referee: Kevin Van Damme |

| 21 March 2021 31 | Anderlecht | 4–1 | Zulte Waregem | Anderlecht |
| 18:15 CET (UTC+1) | El Hadj 32'; Murillo 45+2'; Verschaeren 54'; Cullen (yellow card) 75' (yellow-red card) 85'; Diaby 89' | Report | Vossen 5'; Seck (yellow card) 21'; Marcq (red card) 26' | Stadium: Constant Vanden Stock Stadium; Attendance: 0 Referee: Jan Boterberg |

| 5 April 2021 32 | Zulte Waregem | 2–1 | Eupen | Waregem |
| 16:00 CEST (UTC+2) | De Bock (yellow card) 21', (goal) 82'; Pletinckx 59' | Report | Agbadou (yellow card) 18' (yellow-red card) 80'; Peeters 22'; Amat (yellow card) 72' | Stadium: Regenboogstadion; Attendance: 0 Referee: Wim Smet |

| 10 April 2021 33 | KV Mechelen | 4–2 | Zulte Waregem | Mechelen |
| 18:30 CEST (UTC+2) | Storm 30', 33'; Druijf (yellow card) 44', (goal) 66'; Bijker (yellow card) 72'; De Camargo 80'; Kaboré (yellow card) 90+2' | Report | Bruno 64', 78', (penalty missed) 90+4' | Stadium: Achter de Kazerne; Attendance: 0 Referee: Bert Put |

| 18 April 2021 34 | Zulte Waregem | 2–7 | Gent | Waregem |
| 18:00 CEST (UTC+2) | Marcq (yellow card) 30'; Deschacht (yellow card) 51'; Bruno 80'; Pletinckx 86' | Report | Castro-Montes 14', 40'; Yaremchuk 29', 84'; Ngadeu-Ngadjui 48'; Bezus (yellow card) 57'; Odjidja-Ofoe 63'; De Bruyn 75' | Stadium: Regenboogstadion; Attendance: 0 Referee: Lawrence Visser |

=== Belgian Cup ===
| 3 February 2021 Sixth round | Olympic Charleroi CF | 1–0 | Zulte Waregem | Montignies-sur-Sambre |
| 20:00 CET (UTC+1) | Delbergue (yellow card) 36', (goal) 78'; Corneillie (yellow card) 83' | Report | Srarfi (yellow card) 86' | Stadium: Stade de la Neuville; Attendance: 0 |

== Statistics ==
=== Goalscorers ===
As of 9 August 2020

| Rank | No. | Pos | Nat | Name | Pro League | Belgian Cup | Total |
|---|---|---|---|---|---|---|---|
| 1 | 45 | DF | (Belgium) | Olivier Deschacht | 1 | 0 | 1 |
| Totals | | | | | 1 | 0 | 1 |
