= Cameron Humphreys (footballer, born 1998) =

English footballer

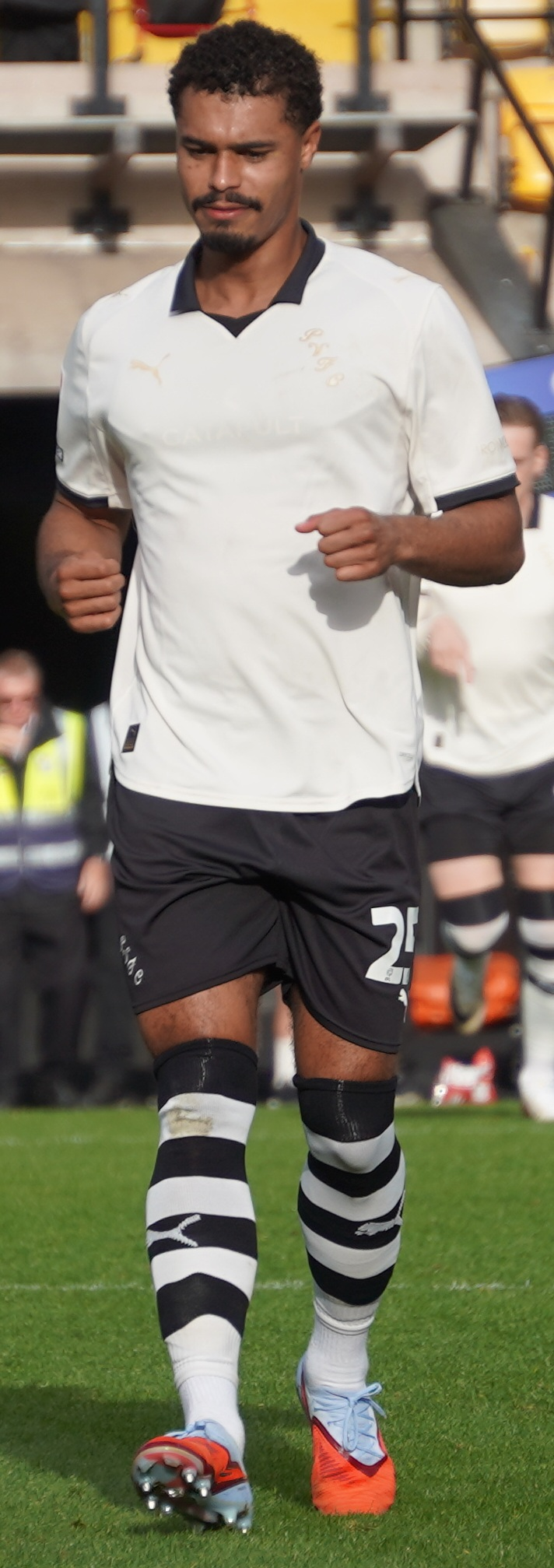
- Humphreys with Port Vale (2025)

Personal information
- Full name: Cameron Lisceous Humphreys-Grant
- Date of birth: 22 August 1998 (age 28)
- Place of birth: Moston, Manchester, England
- Height: 6 ft 2 in (1.87 m)
- Position: Centre-back

Team information
- Current team: Port Vale
- Number: 25

Youth career
- 2009–2010: Blackburn Rovers
- 2010–2011: Oldham Athletic
- 2011–2015: Manchester City

Senior career*
Years	Team	Apps	(Gls)
2015–2019	Manchester City	0	(0)
2019–2022	Zulte Waregem	55	(0)
2020	→ Excelsior (loan)	3	(0)
2022–2025	Rotherham United	103	(2)
2025–	Port Vale	49	(1)

International career
2013–2014	England U16	6	(0)
2014–2015	England U17	11	(0)
2016	England U18	2	(0)
2016	England U19	2	(0)
- * Club domestic league appearances and goals as of 10:22, 22 November 2026 (UTC)

Cameron Lisceous Humphreys-Grant (born 22 August 1998) is an English professional footballer who plays as a centre-back for EFL League Two club Port Vale.

Humphreys turned professional at Manchester City in 2015 and represented England up to under-19 level. He played two FA Cup games for Manchester City before moving to Belgian club Zulte Waregem in 2019. From there, he was loaned to Dutch club Excelsior. He returned to England after signing with Rotherham United in July 2022. He played 113 games for Rotherham and departed for Port Vale in June 2025.

== Club career ==
=== Manchester City ===
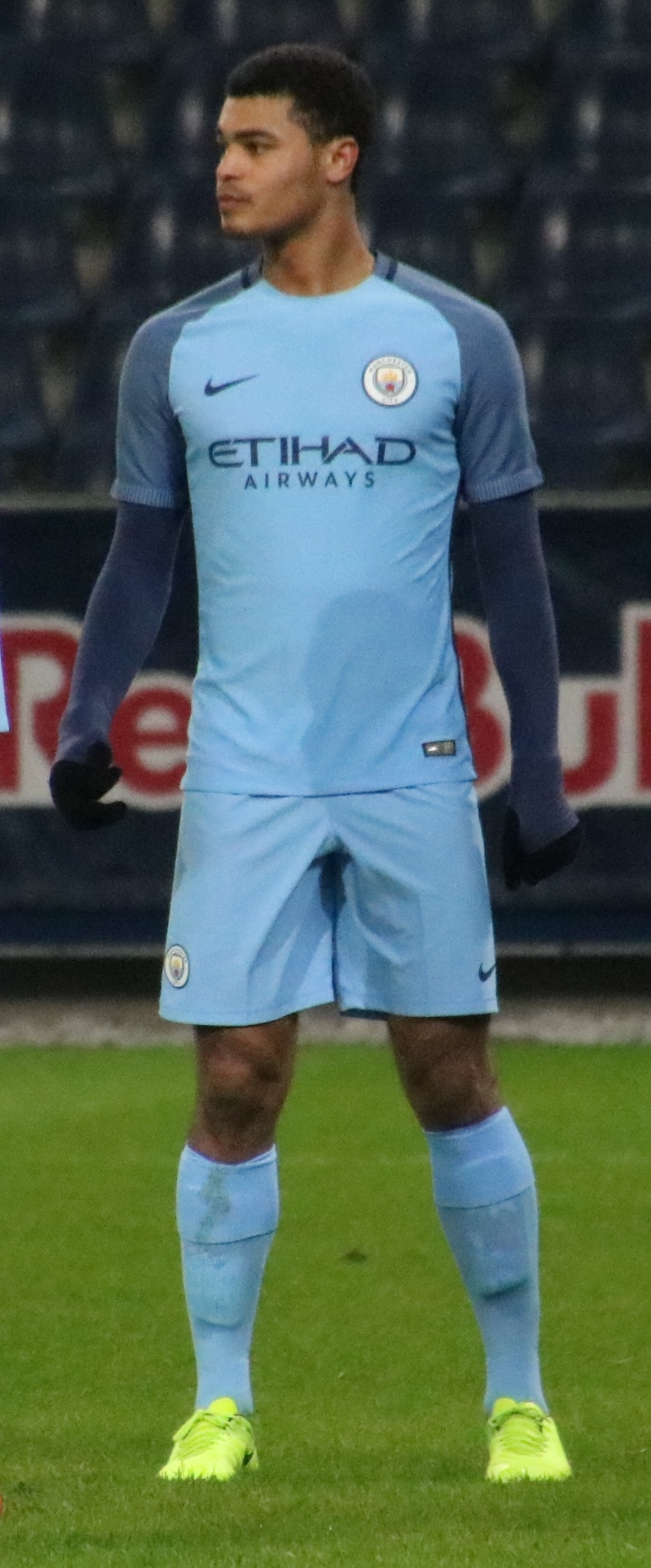
Humphreys as a Manchester City player in 2017

Humphreys grew up in Moston, Manchester and supported Manchester United as a boy. He spent time with Blackburn Rovers and Oldham Athletic, though did not enjoy the experience and returned to the more relaxed atmosphere of Sunday League football. He joined the youth system at Manchester City at the age of 13. He began his scholarship in 2014. He formed a centre-back partnership with Tosin Adarabioyo, quickly working his way into Patrick Vieira's under-19 team. He played in the 2015 FA Youth Cup final defeat to Chelsea. He was named Players' Player of the Year at the 2014–15 Academy Awards.

At the age of 16, he travelled with the first-team squad on their pre-season tour and played in a friendly fixture against Real Madrid after being called up by manager Manuel Pellegrini. He signed his first professional (three-year) contract on 24 August, two days after his 17th birthday. He was praised for his character by coach Jason Wilcox, whilst Academy manager Simon Davies said that he planned to make Humphreys a captain to improve his leadership skills.

"To play in front of 100,000 people was crazy. I think I had a good game and I played the full 90 minutes I actually did a Cruyff turn on Ronaldo, I took the ball off Karim Benzema and Gareth Bale gave me his shirt after the game. It was a good experience."

— Humphreys reflecting on his non-competitive debut at the age of 16 in Australia.

On 30 January 2016, he made his competitive debut in an FA Cup game against Aston Villa when he replaced Nicolás Otamendi 88 minutes into a 4–0 victory at Villa Park. He also featured in the following round, a 5–1 defeat at Chelsea where Pellegrini named a plethora of youngsters in the matchday squad. However, City signed young defenders such as Eric García and Philippe Sandler, whilst Humphreys struggled with serious injuries. He made no more first-team appearances during his three remaining years at the City of Manchester Stadium and rejected the club's offer of a new contract to instead look for senior football elsewhere, though later admitted that he should have first spoken with manager Pep Guardiola.

=== Zulte Waregem ===
On 22 June 2019, Humphreys joined Belgian First Division A club Zulte Waregem. He played in both a back three and back four during his time with Waregem. He played three games in the 2019–20 season. On 21 January 2020, he joined Dutch Eerste Divisie club Excelsior on loan. He made his debut on 21 February, in a 6–4 win over FC Den Bosch at the Van Donge & De Roo Stadion; a game that manager Marinus Dijkhuizen said was "unbelievable". He played two more games for Excelsior before the league was stopped due to the COVID-19 pandemic in the Netherlands. Back at the Regenboogstadion, he played 26 league games in each of the 2020–21 and 2021–22 campaigns.

=== Rotherham United ===
On 5 July 2022, Humphreys signed a three-year contract with Championship club Rotherham United. He briefly struggled with a hamstring injury in August, which initially seemed "serious", before becoming an ever-present in the second half of the 2022–23 season, impressing both in a 3–5–2 and 4–3–3 system. Manager Matt Taylor said he was excelling in his all-round game and had particularly improved his prowess in the air.

Taylor started negotiations on a new contract in August 2023, saying he felt Humphreys could play in the Premier League. Paul Warne, now manager of Derby County, refuted speculation that he would sign Humphreys for £1.5 million as "I have quite a lot of centre-backs and I haven't got £1.5m", though insisted that "I take full credit for signing Cameron Humphreys [at Rotherham] and he is an amazing centre-back". However, he suffered a hamstring injury the following month, which required surgery and ruled him out of action for the rest of the year. He eventually made his return after just over four-and-a-half months out as the injury – a tear close to the tendon – was "about as serious a hamstring injury as you can get". He was eased back to full fitness by short-lived boss Leam Richardson. Humphreys played 27 games in the 2023–24 campaign, which ended in relegation.

He scored his first career goal on 14 September 2024, in a 2–2 draw with Burton Albion at the New York Stadium. Humphreys was initially banished from the matchday squad by new manager Steve Evans, who accused him of "under-eights defending". Evans then played him out of position in defensive midfield midway through the 2024–25 campaign as he wanted to inject more mobility and a high press in attack. Initially believed to be on his way out under Evans, the manager remarked that "he's taken to the role like a duck takes to water". He made 113 appearances for the Millers, scoring his second career goal in his final game for the club, the winner in a 2–1 victory over Peterborough United. He left the club after rejecting the offer of a new contract, which manager Matt Hamshaw said was due to him seeking "a fresh challenge... it wasn't about terms".

=== Port Vale ===
On 25 June 2025, Humphreys signed a two-year deal with newly-promoted League One club Port Vale. He made 35 league starts in the 2025–26 season, which culminated in relegation.

== International career ==
Humphreys won 21 England caps between under-16 and under-19 level. He made his debut for the under-17 team at the age of 14.

== Style of play ==
Humphreys is a centre-back who can also fill in as a midfielder due to his ability on the ball. He described himself as a "ball-playing centre back. Fast, strong, aggressive, good in the air. I would say a modern-day centre back".

== Career statistics ==
As of match played 21 November 2026

Appearances and goals by club, season and competition
Club	Season	League			National Cup		League Cup		Other		Total	
Club	Season	Division	Apps	Goals	Apps	Goals	Apps	Goals	Apps	Goals	Apps	Goals
Manchester City	2015–16	Premier League	0	0	2	0	0	0	0	0	2	0
Manchester City U21	2018–19	—			—		—		2 (Note: Appearance(s) in EFL Trophy)	0	2	0
Zulte Waregem	2019–20	Belgian First Division A	3	0	0	0	—		—		3	0
Zulte Waregem	2020–21	Belgian First Division A	26	0	1	0	—		—		27	0
Zulte Waregem	2021–22	Belgian First Division A	26	0	2	0	—		—		28	0
Zulte Waregem	Total		55	0	3	0	0	0	0	0	58	0
Excelsior (loan)	2019–20	Eerste Divisie	3	0	0	0	—		—		3	0
Rotherham United	2022–23	Championship	38	0	1	0	1	0	—		40	0
Rotherham United	2023–24	Championship	25	0	0	0	2	0	—		27	0
Rotherham United	2024–25	League One	40	2	1	0	1	0	4	0	46	2
Rotherham United	Total		103	2	2	0	4	0	4	0	113	2
Port Vale	2025–26	League One	37	1	5	0	3	0	3	0	48	1
Port Vale	2026–27	League Two	12	0	1	0	1	0	3	0	17	0
Port Vale	Total		49	1	6	0	4	0	6	0	65	1
Career total			210	3	13	0	8	0	12	0	243	3

== Honours ==
Manchester City Youth

- FA Youth Cup runner-up: 2015
