= Gianni Bruno =

Belgian footballer

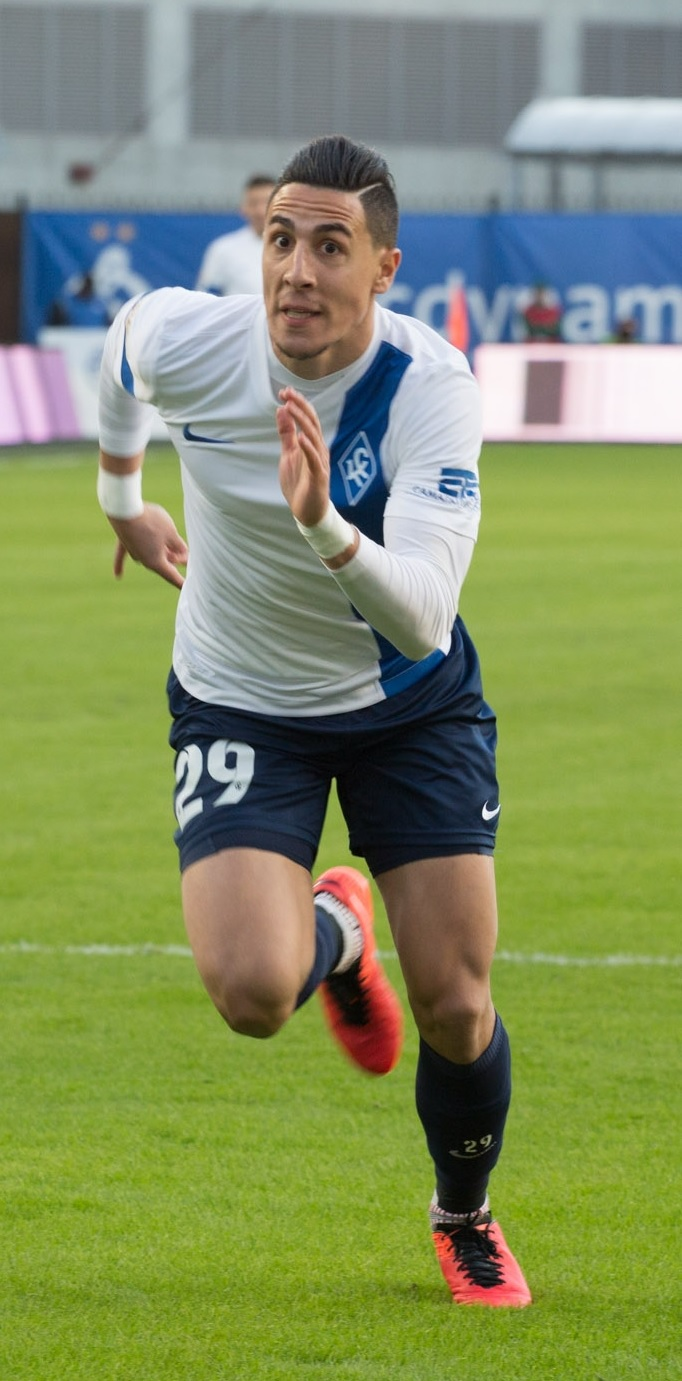
- Bruno with Krylia Sovetov in 2016

Personal information
- Full name: Gianni Salvatore P. Bruno
- Date of birth: 19 August 1991 (age 35)
- Place of birth: Rocourt, Belgium
- Height: 1.80 m (5 ft 11 in)
- Position: Forward

Team information
- Current team: Bandırmaspor
- Number: 9

Youth career
- 1996–2000: Liège
- 2000–2007: Standard Liège
- 2007–2011: Lille

Senior career*
| Years | Team | Apps | (Gls) |
| 2011–2014 | Lille | 23 | (1) |
| 2013–2014 | → Bastia (loan) | 31 | (8) |
| 2014–2017 | Evian TG | 38 | (5) |
| 2014–2015 | → Lorient (loan) | 12 | (1) |
| 2016–2017 | → Krylia Sovetov (loan) | 28 | (7) |
| 2017–2019 | Cercle Brugge | 46 | (16) |
| 2019–2021 | Zulte Waregem | 61 | (29) |
| 2021–2023 | Gent | 9 | (1) |
| 2022–2023 | → Sint-Truiden (loan) | 30 | (18) |
| 2023–2025 | Eyüpspor | 46 | (18) |
| 2025–2026 | Iğdır | 50 | (26) |
| 2026– | Bandırmaspor | 8 | (4) |

International career
| 2005 | Belgium U15 | 5 | (1) |
| 2006–2007 | Belgium U16 | 11 | (3) |
| 2007–2008 | Belgium U17 | 11 | (3) |
| 2008–2009 | Belgium U18 | 6 | (3) |
| 2009–2010 | Belgium U19 | 14 | (7) |
| 2010 | Belgium U20 | 1 | (0) |
| 2010–2012 | Belgium U21 | 8 | (3) |
- * Club domestic league appearances and goals as of 17 October 2026

Gianni Bruno (born 19 August 1991) is a Belgian professional footballer who plays as a forward for Turkish TFF 1. Lig club Bandırmaspor.

== Club career ==
=== Early career ===
Bruno was born in Rocourt, a local town in the city of Liège, to Italian parents. As a result, he possesses dual-nationality. He began his career playing for hometown club FC Liège where his father was a coach. After seven years at the club, after Liège endured financial difficulties, Bruno moved to one of the biggest clubs in the country Standard Liège. He spent seven years at Standard and was a two-time national champion at under-12 and under-17 level with the club. Towards the end of his tenure at Standard, Bruno featured with the club's reserve team in a match against Anderlecht. Despite receiving a professional contract offer from Standard, Bruno departed the club to join Lille in France. He justified departing the club citing France's better training methods and Lille's close proximity to his home in Belgium.

=== Lille ===
Bruno began his career at Lille in the club's youth academy in Luchin. After two years in the club's academy, during the 2008–09 season, he began playing on the club's reserve team in the Championnat de France amateur, the fourth level of French football. Bruno was promoted to the reserve team full-time in the following season. He appeared in 27 matches scoring a team-high 11 goals. After playing the 2010–11 season with the reserve team, on 8 June 2011, Bruno signed his first professional contract agreeing to a one-year deal with Lille. He was, subsequently, promoted to the senior team by manager Rudi Garcia and assigned the number 19 shirt.

Bruno made his professional debut on 11 January 2012 appearing as a substitute in a 2–1 defeat to Lyon in the Coupe de la Ligue. Fours days later, he made his league debut appearing as a substitute in another defeat, this time to Marseille.

Bruno was sent on loan to Bastia for the 2013–14 season.

=== Evian ===
At the beginning of the 2014–15 season, Bruno joined Evian Thonon Gaillard on a five-year contract. A few months later, he was loaned to fellow Ligue 1 team FC Lorient.

=== Cercle Brugge ===
On 3 July 2017, Cercle Brugge announced the transfer of Gianni to the organization. He signed a contract for one season.

=== Gent and STVV ===
On 11 June 2021, after scoring 20 goals in the previous season for Zulte Waregem, Bruno joined Gent on a three-year contract, but only scored one league goal in his first season at the Buffalos.

On 11 July 2022, Bruno moved on a season-long loan to Sint-Truiden, scoring 18 league goals in his debut season with the Canaries, a new one-season club record, surpassing Désiré Mbonabucya, Yuma Suzuki and Eddy Koens.

=== Eyüpspor ===
On 14 August 2023, Bruno moved to Eyüpspor in the second-tier TFF First League.

== International career ==
Bruno is a Belgian youth international and has played for all levels for which he has been eligible. In total with the Belgian youth international teams, he has attained 59 caps and scored 33 goals.

== Career statistics ==
As of match played January 2026

| Club | Season | League | | | National cup (Note: Includes Coupe de France, Belgian Cup) | | League cup (Note: Includes Coupe de la Ligue) | | Europe | | Total | |
| Club | Season | Division | Apps | Goals | Apps | Goals | Apps | Goals | Apps | Goals | Apps | Goals |
|---|---|---|---|---|---|---|---|---|---|---|---|---|
| Lille | 2011–12 | Ligue 1 | 10 | 1 | 2 | 1 | 1 | 0 | 0 | 0 | 13 | 2 |
| Lille | 2012–13 | Ligue 1 | 13 | 0 | 1 | 0 | 2 | 1 | 2 (Note: Appearances in UEFA Champions League) | 1 | 18 | 2 |
| Lille | Total | | 23 | 1 | 3 | 1 | 3 | 1 | 2 | 1 | 31 | 4 |
| Bastia (loan) | 2013–14 | Ligue 1 | 31 | 8 | 2 | 0 | 0 | 0 | — | | 33 | 8 |
| Evian TG | 2014–15 | Ligue 1 | 17 | 1 | 0 | 0 | 1 | 0 | — | | 18 | 1 |
| Evian TG | 2015–16 | Ligue 2 | 21 | 4 | 1 | 0 | 2 | 0 | — | | 24 | 4 |
| Evian TG | Total | | 38 | 5 | 1 | 0 | 3 | 0 | — | | 42 | 5 |
| Lorient (loan) | 2014–15 | Ligue 1 | 12 | 1 | — | | — | | — | | 12 | 1 |
| Krylia Sovetov (loan) | 2015–16 | Russian Premier League | 11 | 2 | 0 | 0 | — | | — | | 11 | 2 |
| Krylia Sovetov (loan) | 2016–17 | Russian Premier League | 17 | 5 | 0 | 0 | — | | — | | 17 | 5 |
| Krylia Sovetov (loan) | Total | | 28 | 7 | 0 | 0 | — | | — | | 28 | 7 |
| Cercle Brugge | 2017–18 | Belgian First Division B | 12 | 3 | 2 | 0 | — | | — | | 14 | 3 |
| Cercle Brugge | 2018–19 | Belgian Pro League | 34 | 13 | 1 | 0 | — | | — | | 35 | 13 |
| Cercle Brugge | Total | | 46 | 16 | 3 | 0 | — | | — | | 49 | 16 |
| Zulte Waregem | 2019–20 | Belgian Pro League | 27 | 9 | 5 | 3 | — | | — | | 32 | 12 |
| Zulte Waregem | 2020–21 | Belgian Pro League | 34 | 20 | 1 | 0 | — | | — | | 35 | 20 |
| Zulte Waregem | Total | | 61 | 29 | 6 | 3 | — | | — | | 67 | 32 |
| Gent | 2021–22 | Belgian Pro League | 9 | 1 | 2 | 0 | — | | 5 (Note: Appearances in UEFA Europa Conference League) | 2 | 16 | 3 |
| Sint-Truiden (loan) | 2022–23 | Belgian Pro League | 30 | 18 | 3 | 2 | — | | — | | 33 | 20 |
| Eyüpspor | 2023–24 | TFF First League | 17 | 9 | 0 | 0 | — | | — | | 17 | 9 |
| Iğdır FK | 2024–25 | TFF First League | — | — | 0 | 0 | — | | — | | — | — |
| Iğdır FK | 2025–26 | TFF First League | — | — | 0 | 0 | — | | — | | — | — |
| Career total | | | 295 | 95 | 20 | 6 | 6 | 1 | 7 | 3 | 328 | 105 |
