= Jelle Vossen =

Belgian footballer (born 1989)

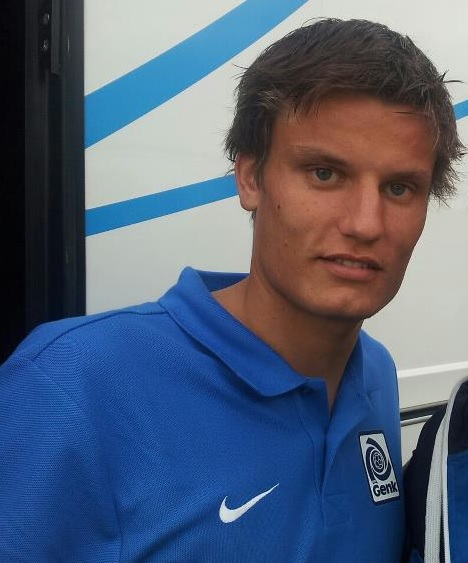
- Vossen with Genk

Personal information
- Date of birth: 22 March 1989 (age 37)
- Place of birth: Bilzen, Belgium
- Height: 1.80 m (5 ft 11 in)
- Position: Striker

Team information
- Current team: Beerschot
- Number: 9

Youth career
- 1994–1997: Eigenbilzen
- 1997–2000: Tongeren
- 2000–2006: Genk

Senior career*
Years	Team	Apps	(Gls)
2006–2015	Genk	192	(77)
2009–2010	→ Cercle Brugge (loan)	17	(6)
2014–2015	→ Middlesbrough (loan)	33	(7)
2015	Burnley	4	(0)
2015–2020	Club Brugge	114	(42)
2020–2026	Zulte Waregem	161	(64)
2026–	Beerschot	0	(0)

International career
2004	Belgium U15	3	(0)
2005	Belgium U16	2	(0)
2005–2006	Belgium U17	16	(6)
2006–2007	Belgium U18	5	(3)
2006–2008	Belgium U19	9	(3)
2008	Belgium U20	1	(1)
2008–2009	Belgium U21	8	(0)
2009–2013	Belgium	12	(2)
- * Club domestic league appearances and goals as of 11 May 2026

Jelle Vossen (born 22 March 1989) is a Belgian professional footballer who plays as a striker for Challenger Pro League club Beerschot.

== Club career ==
=== Genk ===
Vossen was part of a last minute transfer deal in the late evening of 31 August 2009. Cercle Brugge and RC Genk came to an agreement in which Vossen was loaned to Cercle Brugge and his teammate Hans Cornelis joined Brugge in a permanent move. Thomas Buffel went in the opposite direction, joining Genk from Cercle Brugge. In the summer of 2010, Vossen rejoined Genk.

=== Middlesbrough ===
On 1 September 2014, it was announced that Vossen had joined English Championship club Middlesbrough on a season long loan from Genk with a view to a permanent £3 million transfer at the end of the season.

Vossen made his Middlesbrough debut in a 2–1 win against Huddersfield Town on 13 September 2014 coming on as a substitute for Lee Tomlin in the 59th minute. Vossen scored his first goals for the Teesside club, hitting a 45-minute hat-trick in a 5–1 away win against Millwall.

=== Burnley ===
On 6 July 2015, it was confirmed that Burnley had signed Vossen on a three-year deal for an undisclosed fee. On 8 August 2015, on the opening day of the English Championship 2015/16 season, Vossen made his Burnley debut against Leeds United in a 1–1 draw.

=== Club Brugge ===
On 30 August 2015, despite spending less than two months under contract at Burnley, Vossen signed a five-year contract at Club Brugge.

On 23 September 2016, Vossen scored his 100th goal in the Belgian Pro League in a game against Mouscron.

=== Zulte Waregem ===
Vossen joined Zulte Waregem on 30 January 2020, signing a three-and-a-half-year deal. On 13 March 2022, Vossen scored his 150th goal in the Belgian Pro League, slotting home a penalty-kick against Eupen. His goal also meant that he became a top-ten goalscorer in Belgian top division history since turning professional in 1974.

Following the club's relegation, Vossen played a key role in their promotion to the top division during the 2024–25 season, finishing as the league's top scorer with 15 goals. In the meantime, he extended his contract with the club until 2026.

== International career ==
Vossen was called up for Belgium's Kirin Cup matches against Chile and Japan. As from 2010, he is often called for the national team together with his co-attacker from Genk Marvin Ogunjimi. On 12 October 2010, Vossen scored his first goal in a 4–4 home draw Euro 2012 qualifying game against Austria.

== Career statistics ==
=== Club ===
As of match played 15 March 2025

Appearances and goals by club, season and competition
Club	Season	League			National cup (Note: Includes Belgian Cup, FA Cup)		League cup (Note: Includes Football League Cup)		Europe		Other		Total	
Club	Season	Division	Apps	Goals	Apps	Goals	Apps	Goals	Apps	Goals	Apps	Goals	Apps	Goals
Genk	2006–07	Belgian Pro League	7	1	0	0	—		—		—		7	1
Genk	2007–08	Belgian Pro League	17	3	1	0	—		0	0	—		18	3
Genk	2008–09	Belgian Pro League	20	4	5	2	—		—		—		25	6
Genk	2009–10	Belgian Pro League	3	0	—		—		0	0	0	0	3	0
Genk	2010–11	Belgian Pro League	37	20	1	0	—		3 (Note: Appearances in UEFA Europa League)	4	—		41	24
Genk	2011–12	Belgian Pro League	36	20	2	2	—		10 (Note: Appearances in UEFA Champions League)	5	1 (Note: Appearance in Belgian Super Cup)	0	49	27
Genk	2012–13	Belgian Pro League	32	17	6	4	—		10	4	—		48	25
Genk	2013–14	Belgian Pro League	38	12	4	2	—		10	5	1	0	53	19
Genk	2014–15	Belgian Pro League	2	0	—		—		—		—		2	0
Genk	Total		192	77	19	10	—		33	18	2	0	246	105
Cercle Brugge (loan)	2009–10	Belgian Pro League	17	6	6	2	—		—		—		23	8
Middlesbrough (loan)	2014–15	Championship	33	7	3	1	1	0	—		3 (Note: Appearances in Championship play-offs)	1	40	9
Burnley	2015–16	Championship	4	0	—		1	0	—		—		5	0
Club Brugge	2015–16	Belgian Pro League	31	14	5	1	—		5	1	—		41	16
Club Brugge	2016–17	Belgian Pro League	39	16	1	1	—		4	1	1	0	45	18
Club Brugge	2017–18	Belgian Pro League	28	7	4	2	—		3	0	0	0	35	9
Club Brugge	2018–19	Belgian Pro League	14	5	1	0	—		2	0	1	0	18	5
Club Brugge	Total		112	42	11	4	—		14	2	2	0	139	48
Zulte Waregem	2019–20	Belgian Pro League	6	2	0	0	—		—		—		6	2
Zulte Waregem	2020–21	Belgian Pro League	29	6	1	0	—		—		—		30	6
Zulte Waregem	2021–22	Belgian Pro League	30	17	2	1	—		—		—		32	18
Zulte Waregem	2022–23	Belgian Pro League	31	9	3	0	—		—		—		34	9
Zulte Waregem	2023–24	Challenger Pro League	26	13	3	1	—		—		2 (Note: Appearances in Challenger Pro League promotion play-offs)	1	31	15
Zulte Waregem	2024–25	Challenger Pro League	20	13	3	1	—		—		—		23	14
Zulte Waregem	Total		142	60	12	3	—		—		2	1	156	64
Career total			500	192	51	20	2	0	47	20	9	2	609	234

=== International ===
As of match played 19 November 2013

Appearances and goals by national team and year
National team	Year	Apps	Goals
Belgium	2009	2	0
Belgium	2010	4	1
Belgium	2011	4	1
Belgium	2012	1	0
Belgium	2013	1	0
Total		12	2

Scores and results list Belgium's goal tally first, score column indicates score after each Vossen goal.

List of international goals scored by Jelle Vossen
No.	Date	Venue	Opponent	Score	Result	Competition
1	12 October 2010	King Baudouin Stadium, Brussels, Belgium	Austria	1–0	4–4	Euro 2012 qualifying
2	29 March 2011	King Baudouin Stadium, Brussels, Belgium	Azerbaijan	4–1	4–1	Euro 2012 qualifying

== Honours ==
Genk

- Belgian Pro League: 2010–11
- Belgian Cup: 2008–09, 2012–13
- Belgian Super Cup: 2011

Club Brugge

- Belgian Pro League: 2015–16, 2017–18
- Belgian Super Cup: 2016, 2018

Zulte Waregem

- Challenger Pro League: 2024–25

Individual

- Challenger Pro League top scorer: 2024–25
