= Jean-Luc Dompé =

French footballer (born 1995)

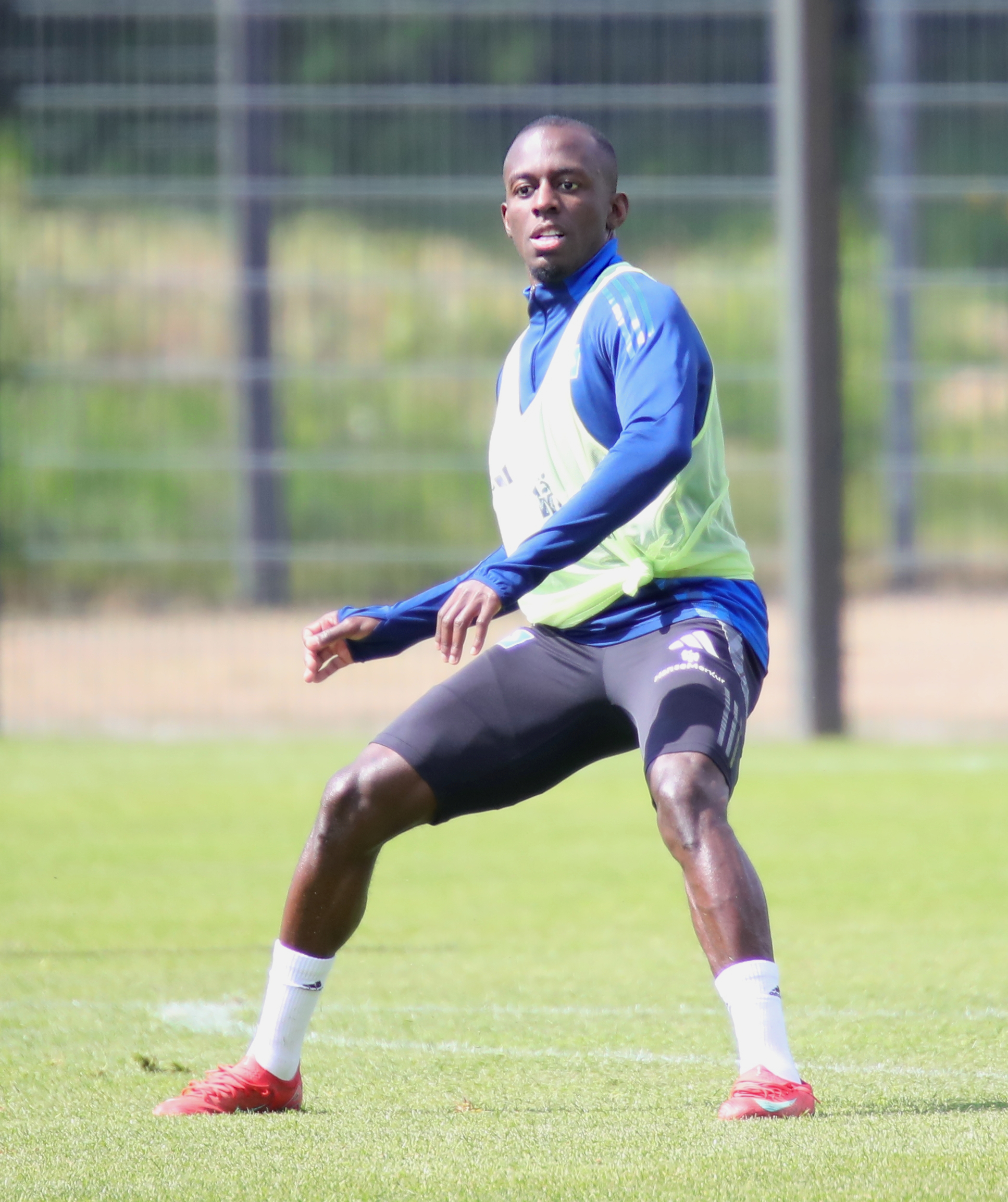
- Dompé in 2025

Personal information
- Full name: Jean-Luc Mamadou Diarra Dompé
- Date of birth: 12 August 1995 (age 31)
- Place of birth: Arpajon, France
- Height: 1.70 m (5 ft 7 in)
- Position: Left winger

Team information
- Current team: Konyaspor
- Number: 91

Youth career
- 1999–2007: Évry
- 2007–2010: Châteauroux
- 2010–2012: Évry

Senior career*
Years	Team	Apps	(Gls)
2012–2014	Valenciennes B	27	(3)
2014–2015	Valenciennes	17	(0)
2015–2016	Sint-Truiden	13	(1)
2016–2018	Standard Liège	15	(1)
2017	→ Eupen (loan)	2	(0)
2017–2018	→ Amiens (loan)	1	(0)
2018–2020	Gent	29	(1)
2020	→ Zulte Waregem (loan)	6	(0)
2020–2022	Zulte Waregem	63	(8)
2022–2026	Hamburger SV	107	(18)
2026–	Konyaspor	0	(0)

International career
2015–2016	France U20	6	(0)
- * Club domestic league appearances and goals as of 21 March 2026

Jean-Luc Mamadou Diarra Dompé (born 12 August 1995) is a French professional footballer who plays as a left winger for Süper Lig club Konyaspor.

== Club career ==
Dompé spent the early years of his career at French side Valenciennes. He began playing with the club's reserves team in the CFA 1 and CFA 2 where he made 27 appearances and scored 3 goals. He spent three seasons with the B-team before making the step up to the first-team squad under Bernard Casoni. He played 21 times for the Valenciennes first-team before leaving in June 2015.

In June 2015, Dompé left France to go to Belgium in order to join newly promoted Pro League club Sint-Truiden on a three-year contract. He made 14 appearances and scored two goals in all competitions for the Limburg based club before leaving in January 2016 to join Standard Liège where he signed a contract until 2019. At Standard Liège he scored as they won the 2016 Belgian Cup Final.

Dompé signed on loan to Eupen from Standard Liège in February 2017. He was then loaned out to Amiens.

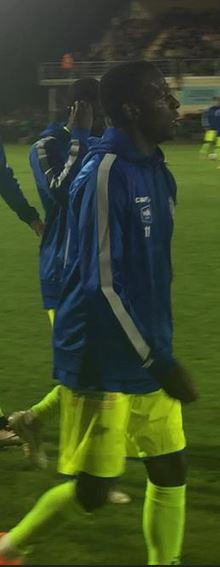
Dompé in 2018

In June 2018, he joined Gent by signing a two-year contract until June 2020. On 31 January 2020, he transferred to Zulte Waregem.

On 18 August 2022, Dompé signed a three-year contract with Hamburger SV in Germany.

On 28 August 2026, Dompé signed a two-year contract with Turkish club Konyaspor.

== International career ==
Dompé is of Malian descent. He is a youth international for France. His first professional honour was with the France U20s as the side won the 2015 Toulon Tournament.

== Personal life ==
On 25 January 2026, Dompé was caught for drunk driving when a police officer found alcohol in his system during a breathalyzer test. Following that incident, the player was fined 100,000 euros and temporarily suspended by his club, Hamburger SV, but was reinstated early March after showing good behaviour.

== Career statistics ==
As of match played 21 March 2026

Appearances and goals by club, season and competition
Club	Season	League			National cup		League cup		Continental		Other		Total	
Club	Season	Division	Apps	Goals	Apps	Goals	Apps	Goals	Apps	Goals	Apps	Goals	Apps	Goals
Valenciennes	2014–15	Ligue 2	17	0	2	0	1	0	—		—		20	0
Sint-Truiden	2015–16	Belgian Pro League	13	1	1	1	—		—		—		14	2
Standard Liège	2015–16	Belgian Pro League	8	1	2	1	—		—		—		10	2
Standard Liège	2016–17	Belgian Pro League	7	0	0	0	—		2	0	—		9	0
Standard Liège	Total		15	1	2	1	—		2	0	—		19	2
Eupen (loan)	2016–17	Belgian Pro League	2	0	1	0	—		—		—		3	0
Amiens (loan)	2017–18	Ligue 1	1	0	0	0	0	0	—		—		1	0
Gent	2018–19	Belgian Pro League	23	1	4	3	—		4	0	—		31	4
Gent	2019–20	Belgian Pro League	6	0	1	0	—		2	0	—		9	0
Gent	Total		29	1	5	3	—		6	0	—		40	4
Zulte Waregem (loan)	2019–20	Belgian Pro League	6	0	1	0	—		—		—		7	0
Zulte Waregem	2020–21	Belgian Pro League	27	6	1	0	—		—		—		28	6
Zulte Waregem	2021–22	Belgian Pro League	32	2	2	0	—		—		—		34	2
Zulte Waregem	2022–23	Belgian Pro League	4	0	0	0	—		—		—		4	0
Zulte Waregem	Total		63	8	3	0	—		0	0	0	0	66	8
Hamburger SV	2022–23	2. Bundesliga	27	3	1	0	—		—		—		28	3
Hamburger SV	2023–24	2. Bundesliga	28	3	1	0	—		—		—		29	3
Hamburger SV	2024–25	2. Bundesliga	32	9	1	0	—		—		—		33	9
Hamburger SV	2025–26	Bundesliga	20	3	1	0	—		—		—		21	3
Hamburger SV	Total		107	18	4	0	—		—		—		111	18
Career total			243	29	19	5	1	0	8	0	0	0	281	34

== Honours ==
Club

Standard Liège

- Belgian Cup: 2015–16

International

France U20s

- Toulon Tournament: 2015
