= Ewoud Pletinckx =

Belgian footballer

Personal information
- Date of birth: 10 October 2000 (age 26)
- Place of birth: Zottegem, Belgium
- Height: 1.90 m (6 ft 3 in)
- Position: Centre back

Team information
- Current team: OH Leuven
- Number: 28

Youth career
- 2012–2019: Zulte Waregem

Senior career*
Years	Team	Apps	(Gls)
2019–2022	Zulte Waregem	88	(4)
2022–	OH Leuven	126	(8)

International career^{‡}
2017	Belgium U17	5	(0)
2017–2018	Belgium U18	6	(0)
2018–2019	Belgium U19	7	(0)
2021–2023	Belgium U21	11	(0)
- * Club domestic league appearances and goals as of 1 June 2026 ‡ National team caps and goals as of 23:14, 21 June 2023 (UTC)

Ewoud Pletinckx (born 10 October 2000) is a Belgian footballer who plays as a centre back for OH Leuven.

== Club career ==
Pletinckx joined the youth academy of Zulte Waregem in 2012. Pletinckx made his professional debut with Zulte Waregem in a 2-1 Belgian First Division A loss to Antwerp on 19 January 2019.

== International career ==
Pletinckx is a youth international for Belgium, and represented the Belgium U19s in 2018.

== Career statistics ==
Appearances and goals by club, season and competition
Club	Season	League			National Cup (Note: Includes Belgian Cup)		Europe		Other		Total	
Club	Season	Division	Apps	Goals	Apps	Goals	Apps	Goals	Apps	Goals	Apps	Goals
Zulte Waregem	2018–19	Belgian First Division A	16	0	0	0	—		—		16	0
Zulte Waregem	2019–20	Belgian First Division A	22	0	4	0	—		—		26	0
Zulte Waregem	2020–21	Belgian First Division A	23	2	1	0	—		—		24	2
Zulte Waregem	2021–22	Belgian First Division A	27	1	2	0	—		—		29	1
Zulte Waregem	Total		88	3	7	0	—		—		95	3
OH Leuven	2022–23	Belgian First Division A	14	0	0	0	—		—		14	0
Career total			102	3	7	0	—		—		109	3
