= Nikos Kenourgios =

Greek footballer

Personal information
- Full name: Nikolaos Kenourgios
- Date of birth: 8 September 1998 (age 28)
- Place of birth: Athens, Greece
- Height: 1.87 m (6 ft 2 in)
- Position: Left-back

Team information
- Current team: Pyunik
- Number: 3

Youth career
- 2014–2015: Alimos
- 2015–2017: PAS Giannina

Senior career*
Years	Team	Apps	(Gls)
2017–2018	Aittitos Spata	1	(0)
2018–2019	Sparta	25	(4)
2019–2021	Zulte Waregem	18	(2)
2021–2022	Dinamo București	8	(0)
2022–2025	Athens Kallithea	50	(3)
2025–	Pyunik	12	(0)
- * Club domestic league appearances and goals as of 18 June 2026

Nikos Kenourgios (Greek: Νίκος Καινούργιος; born 8 September 1998) is a Greek professional footballer who plays as a left-back for Armenian Premier League club Pyunik.

== Career ==
=== Early career ===
Kenourgios passed through the academies of Alimos and PAS Giannina before beginning his professional career at Aittitos Spata followed by Sparta.

=== Zulte Waregem ===
After a trial in the summer of 2019, Kenourgios earned a contract with Belgian top flight club with Zulte Waregem, where he made 25 total league and cup appearances with two goals in the 2019/20 and 2020/21 seasons.

=== Dinamo București ===
From Zulte, Kainourgios moved on to Dinamo București, but would dissolve his contract before the end of the season prior to the club's insolvency.

=== Athens Kallithea FC ===
In August 2022, Kenourgios joined Athens Kallithea FC.

=== FC Pyunik ===
On 6 July 2025, Pyunik announced the signing of a contract with Kenourgios.

== Career statistics ==
As of 7 July 2024

Club	Season	League			Cup		Continental		Other		Total	
Club	Season	Division	Apps	Goals	Apps	Goals	Apps	Goals	Apps	Goals	Apps	Goals
Sparta	2018–19	Superleague Greece 2	25	4	1	0	—		—		26	4
Zulte Waregem	2019–20	Belgian First Division A	3	0	0	0	—		—		3	0
Zulte Waregem	2020–21	Belgian First Division A	15	2	0	0	—		—		15	2
Zulte Waregem	Total		18	2	0	0	—		—		18	2
Dinamo București	2021–22	Liga I	7	0	0	0	—		—		7	0
Athens Kallithea	2022–23	Superleague Greece 2	17	2	2	0	—		—		19	2
Athens Kallithea	2023–24	Superleague Greece 2	13	0	2	0	—		—		15	0
Athens Kallithea	Total		30	2	4	0	0	0	—		34	2
Career total			103	0	5	0	0	0	0	0	108	9
