= Eike Bansen =

German footballer (born 1998)

Personal information
- Date of birth: 21 February 1998 (age 28)
- Place of birth: Dortmund, Germany
- Height: 1.97 m (6 ft 6 in)
- Position: Goalkeeper

Team information
- Current team: Atlas Delmenhorst
- Number: 25

Senior career*
Years	Team	Apps	(Gls)
2017–2018	Borussia Dortmund II	5	(0)
2017–2018	Borussia Dortmund	0	(0)
2019–2021	Zulte Waregem	17	(0)
2021–2022	TSV Steinbach Haiger	20	(0)
2022–	Atlas Delmenhorst	17	(0)

International career^{‡}
2017	Germany U19	3	(0)
2017	Germany U20	1	(0)
- * Club domestic league appearances and goals as of 13 November 2022 ‡ National team caps and goals as of 9 October 2017

Eike Bansen (born 21 February 1998) is a German professional footballer who plays as a goalkeeper for Atlas Delmenhorst.

== Club career ==
On 17 June 2021, Bansen returned to Germany and signed a two-year contract with TSV Steinbach Haiger in Regionalliga Südwest.

== International career ==
Bansen was Germany's first-choice goalkeeper at the 2017 UEFA European Under-19 Championship, in which Germany lost 4–1 to both Netherlands and England and beat Bulgaria 3–0, and did not advance from the group stage.
