= Omar Govea =

Mexican footballer (born 1996)

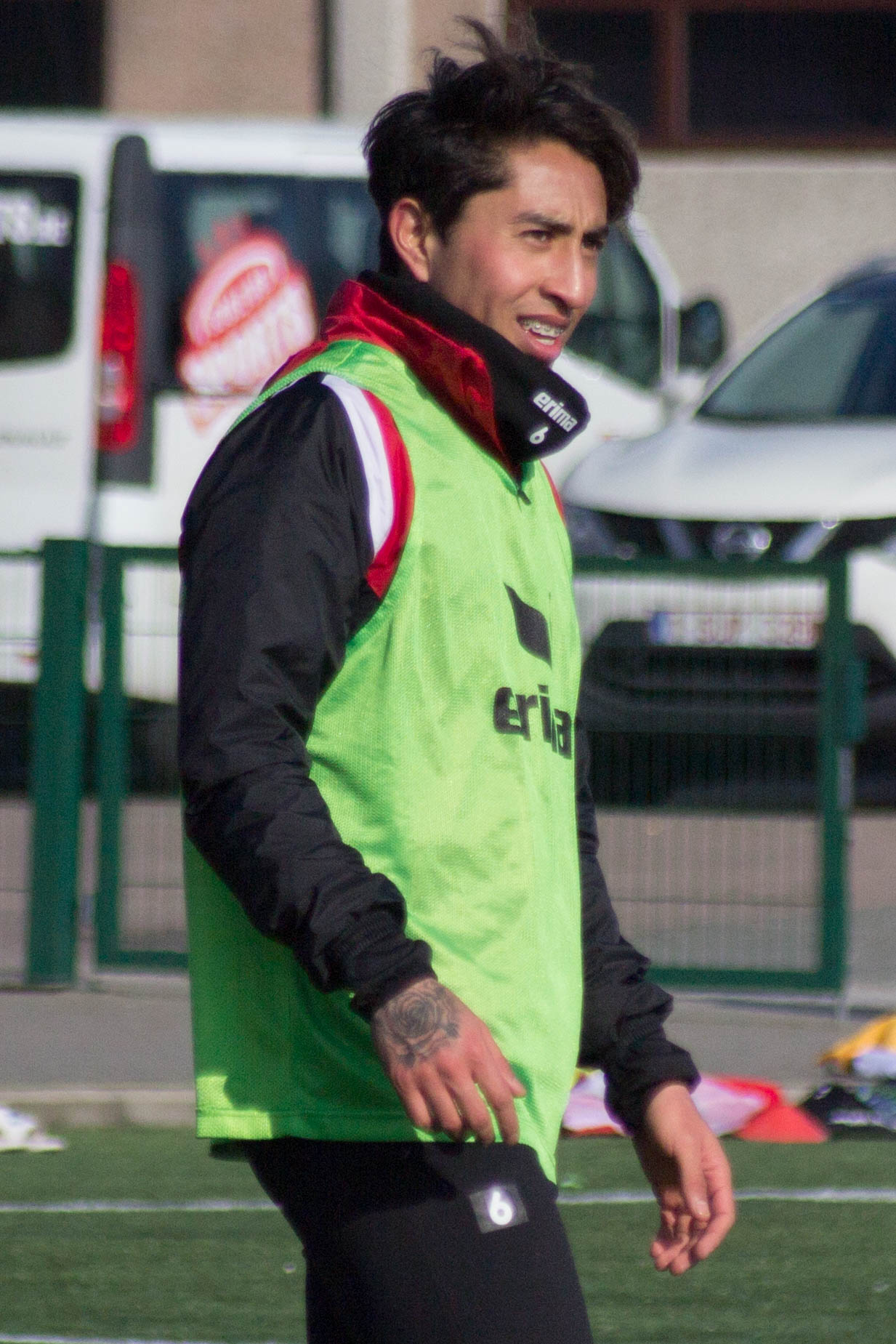
- Govea with Mouscron in 2018

Personal information
- Full name: Omar Nicolás Govea García
- Date of birth: 18 January 1996 (age 30)
- Place of birth: San Luis Potosí, Mexico
- Height: 1.76 m (5 ft 9 in)
- Position: Midfielder

Team information
- Current team: Guadalajara
- Number: 6

Youth career
- –2012: San Luis
- 2012–2013: América

Senior career*
| Years | Team | Apps | (Gls) |
| 2013–2016 | América | 0 | (0) |
| 2014–2015 | → Zacatecas (loan) | 0 | (0) |
| 2015–2016 | → Porto B (loan) | 36 | (0) |
| 2016–2019 | Porto B | 32 | (0) |
| 2017–2018 | → Mouscron (loan) | 33 | (4) |
| 2018–2019 | → Royal Antwerp (loan) | 15 | (0) |
| 2019–2022 | Zulte Waregem | 55 | (4) |
| 2022–2023 | Voluntari | 10 | (1) |
| 2023 | → Monterrey (loan) | 34 | (0) |
| 2024 | Monterrey | 16 | (0) |
| 2024– | Guadalajara | 54 | (2) |

International career^{‡}
| 2013 | Mexico U17 | 6 | (0) |
| 2016 | Mexico U23 | 3 | (0) |
| 2017–2023 | Mexico | 5 | (1) |
Medal record
Men's football
Representing Mexico
FIFA U-17 World Cup
| Runner-up | 2013 United Arab Emirates | Team |
- * Club domestic league appearances and goals as of 8 November 2026 ‡ National team caps and goals as of 16 December 2023

Omar Nicolás Govea García (born 18 January 1996) is a Mexican professional footballer who plays as a midfielder for Liga MX club Guadalajara.

After starting out in his native Mexico, he went on to compete professionally in Portugal, Belgium and Romania.

Internationally, Govea earned his first cap with the senior team in a 1–0 friendly victory over Poland in November 2017.

== Club career ==
=== América ===
Govea spent two years at San Luis where he played in two under-15 tournaments. He was part of a Tercera División selection team where he met Jesús Ramírez, the coach of América's youth academy. He participated at América's under-17 and under-20 youth teams.

==== Loans to Zacatecas and Porto B ====
In the summer of 2014, it was announced Govea was sent out on loan to Ascenso MX club Zacatecas in order to gain professional playing experience. He made his professional debut as substitute on 5 August 2014 in a Copa MX match against Leones Negros, coming on for Antonio López at 82'.

In July 2015, Govea joined FC Porto on loan, and was immediately sent to play for their B team.

He was called to Porto's senior team for the first time on 19 January 2016, in order to make the squad to play against Famalicão in a Taça da Liga match the next day.

=== Porto ===
In May 2016, it was reported that Porto had signed Govea on a permanent transfer, with the player signing a four-year contract with the club.

==== Loans to Mouscron and Royal Antwerp ====
On 6 July 2017, Govea joined Belgian club Royal Excel Mouscron on a one-year loan with an option of purchase. He made his Belgian First Division A debut on 13 July in a 1–0 win over KV Oostende.

On 16 August 2018, Govea joined Royal Antwerp FC on a one-year loan with an option of purchase, where he will wear the number 23.

=== Zulte Waregem ===
On 9 July 2019, Belgian club Zulte Waregem announced Govea as a new signing. He signed a three-year contract with an option of another year. He made his debut on 27 July in a 2–0 loss against Mechelen. On 14 December, he scored his first two goals in a 5–1 home win against Sint-Truiden.

In January 2020, Govea was named as the club's Player of the month for December due to his performances.

=== Voluntari ===
On 21 September 2022, Govea agreed to a two-year contract with Romanian club Voluntari.

=== Monterrey ===
On 17 December 2022, Govea returned to Mexico and joined Monterrey on a one-year loan with an option to buy. On 16 December 2023, Monterrey announced the permanent signing of Govea ahead of the Clausura 2024.

=== Guadalajara ===
On 9 June 2024, Govea joined Guadalajara on a permanent transfer.

On 6 July, Govea made his debut with Guadalajara in scoreless draw against Toluca, coming on as a substitute.

He would score his first goal with Chivas on 27 September 2025 against Puebla in a 2–0 away win.

== International career ==
On 13 November 2017, Govea made his senior debut for Mexico in a 1–0 friendly win over Poland.

On 16 December 2023, in Govea's fifth appearance for the senior national team, he scored his first goal in a 2–3 defeat against Colombia.

== Career statistics ==
=== Club ===
As of match played on 8 November 2026

| Club | Season | League | | | Cup (Note: Includes Copa MX, Belgian Cup and Cupa României) | | Continental | | Other | | Total | |
| Club | Season | Division | Apps | Goals | Apps | Goals | Apps | Goals | Apps | Goals | Apps | Goals |
|---|---|---|---|---|---|---|---|---|---|---|---|---|
| Zacatecas (loan) | 2014–15 | Ascenso MX | — | | 9 | 0 | — | | — | | 9 | 0 |
| Porto B (loan) | 2015–16 | LigaPro | 36 | 0 | — | | — | | — | | 36 | 0 |
| Porto B | 2016–17 | LigaPro | 32 | 0 | — | | — | | — | | 32 | 0 |
| Mouscron (loan) | 2017–18 | Belgian Pro League | 28 | 4 | — | | — | | 5 (Note: Appearances in Belgian First Division A Europa League play-offs) | 0 | 33 | 4 |
| Royal Antwerp (loan) | 2018–19 | Belgian Pro League | 14 | 0 | 1 | 0 | — | | 1 | 0 | 16 | 0 |
| Zulte Waregem | 2019–20 | Belgian Pro League | 21 | 2 | 3 | 3 | — | | — | | 24 | 5 |
| Zulte Waregem | 2020–21 | Belgian Pro League | 28 | 2 | 1 | 0 | — | | — | | 29 | 2 |
| Zulte Waregem | 2021–22 | Belgian Pro League | 6 | 0 | — | | — | | — | | 6 | 0 |
| Zulte Waregem | Total | | 55 | 4 | 4 | 3 | — | | — | | 59 | 7 |
| Voluntari | 2022–23 | Liga I | 10 | 1 | 2 | 0 | — | | — | | 12 | 1 |
| Monterrey (loan) | 2022–23 | Liga MX | 17 | 0 | — | | — | | — | | 17 | 0 |
| Monterrey (loan) | 2023–24 | Liga MX | 17 | 0 | — | | — | | 6 (Note: Appearances in Leagues Cup) | 0 | 23 | 0 |
| Monterrey (loan) | Total | | 34 | 0 | — | | — | | 6 | 0 | 40 | 0 |
| Monterrey | 2023–24 | Liga MX | 16 | 0 | — | | 3 (Note: Appearances in CONCACAF Champions Cup) | 0 | — | | 19 | 0 |
| Guadalajara | 2024–25 | Liga MX | 14 | 0 | — | | — | | 1 | 0 | 15 | 0 |
| Guadalajara | 2025–26 | Liga MX | 28 | 2 | — | | — | | — | | 28 | 2 |
| Guadalajara | 2026–27 | Liga MX | 12 | 0 | — | | — | | 2 | 0 | 14 | 0 |
| Guadalajara | Total | | 54 | 2 | — | | — | | 3 | 0 | 57 | 2 |
| Career total | | | 279 | 11 | 16 | 3 | 3 | 0 | 15 | 0 | 313 | 14 |

=== International ===
As of match played on 16 December 2023

| National team | Year | Apps | Goals |
|---|---|---|---|
| Mexico | 2017 | 1 | 0 |
| Mexico | 2018 | 2 | 0 |
| Mexico | 2020 | 1 | 0 |
| Mexico | 2023 | 1 | 1 |
| Total | | 5 | 1 |

==== International goals ====
Scores and results list Mexico's goal tally first.

| No. | Date | Venue | Opponent | Score | Result | Competition |
|---|---|---|---|---|---|---|
| 1. | 16 December 2023 | Los Angeles Memorial Coliseum, Los Angeles, United States | Colombia | 1–0 | 2–3 | Friendly |

== Honours ==
Porto B

- Segunda Liga: 2015–16
- Premier League International Cup: 2016–17

Mexico U17

- FIFA U-17 World Cup runner-up: 2013

Individual

- Zulte Waregem Player of the Month: December 2019
