= Willy Naessens =

Belgian industrialist (1939–2025)

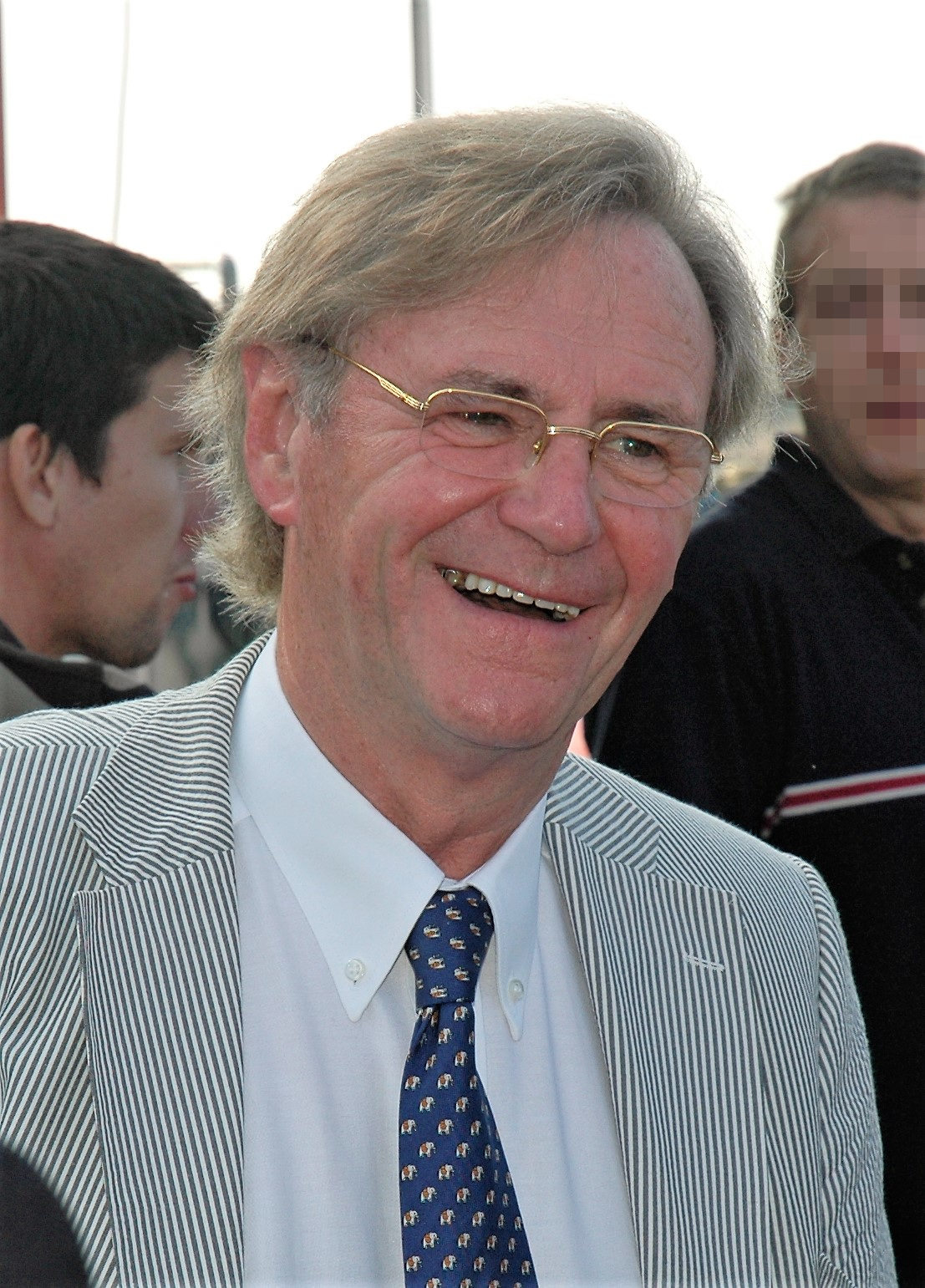
- Naessens in 2007
- Born: 14 February 1939
- Died: 31 March 2025 (aged 86)
- Occupation: Industrialist

Willy Naessens (14 February 1939 – 31 March 2025) was a Belgian industrialist and owner of a group in industrial and swimming pool construction from Wortegem-Petegem that bears his name. He sponsored football club KSV Oudenaarde and was shirt sponsor of first division teams Waasland-Beveren, SV Zulte Waregem and the Dutch RKC Waalwijk. He also sponsored a cycling team for some time.

Naessens was also known as a horse lover. At the annual horse race named "Waregem Koerse" he has organised a "Willy Naessens Hat Trophy" since the beginning of the 21st century, a hat competition based on that of the English Ascot.

== Life and career ==
At a young age, Naessens started a construction business called "Naessens Constructions", specializing in constructing big — but rather economised — industrial buildings and swimming pools. He became one of the most powerful Belgian industrialists. Later, his corporate group participates in many branches of the construction sector, and in non-construction businesses, such as restaurants and sports teams.

Naessens paid for an expensive organ transplant for a Belgian child.

Naessens fell in January 2025 in his home and broke his hip. He died as a result of complications during the recovery from it on 31 March, at the age of 86.
