= Mathieu De Smet =

Belgian footballer

Personal information
- Date of birth: 27 April 2000 (age 26)
- Place of birth: Maldegem, Belgium
- Height: 1.83 m (6 ft 0 in)
- Position: Winger

Team information
- Current team: Gullegem
- Number: 20

Youth career
- KSK Maldegem
- Club Brugge
- 2012–2016: Gent
- 2016–2019: Zulte Waregem

Senior career*
Years	Team	Apps	(Gls)
2019–2022	Zulte Waregem	17	(1)
2020	→ Deinze (loan)	3	(0)
2021–2022	→ TOP Oss (loan)	2	(0)
2022–2024	HSV Hoek	62	(12)
2024–2025	Olsa Brakel	29	(5)
2025–	Gullegem	0	(0)

International career
2017	Belgium U17	1	(0)
2018	Belgium U19	1	(0)
- * Club domestic league appearances and goals as of 12:29, 22 January 2026 (UTC)

Mathieu De Smet (born 27 April 2000) is a Belgian professional footballer who plays as a winger for Gullegem.

== Career ==
=== Zulte Waregem ===
De Smet joined Zulte Waregem in the summer 2016 from K.A.A. Gent. He signed his first professional contract with the club on 1 March 2019 and was permanently promoted into the first team squad. On 31 January 2020, De Smet moved to K.M.S.K. Deinze on loan for the rest of the season. On 31 August 2020, De Smet moved on loan to TOP Oss for the 2021–22 season. On 3 January 2022, the loan was terminated early.
