= Ibrahima Seck =

Senegalese footballer (born 1989)

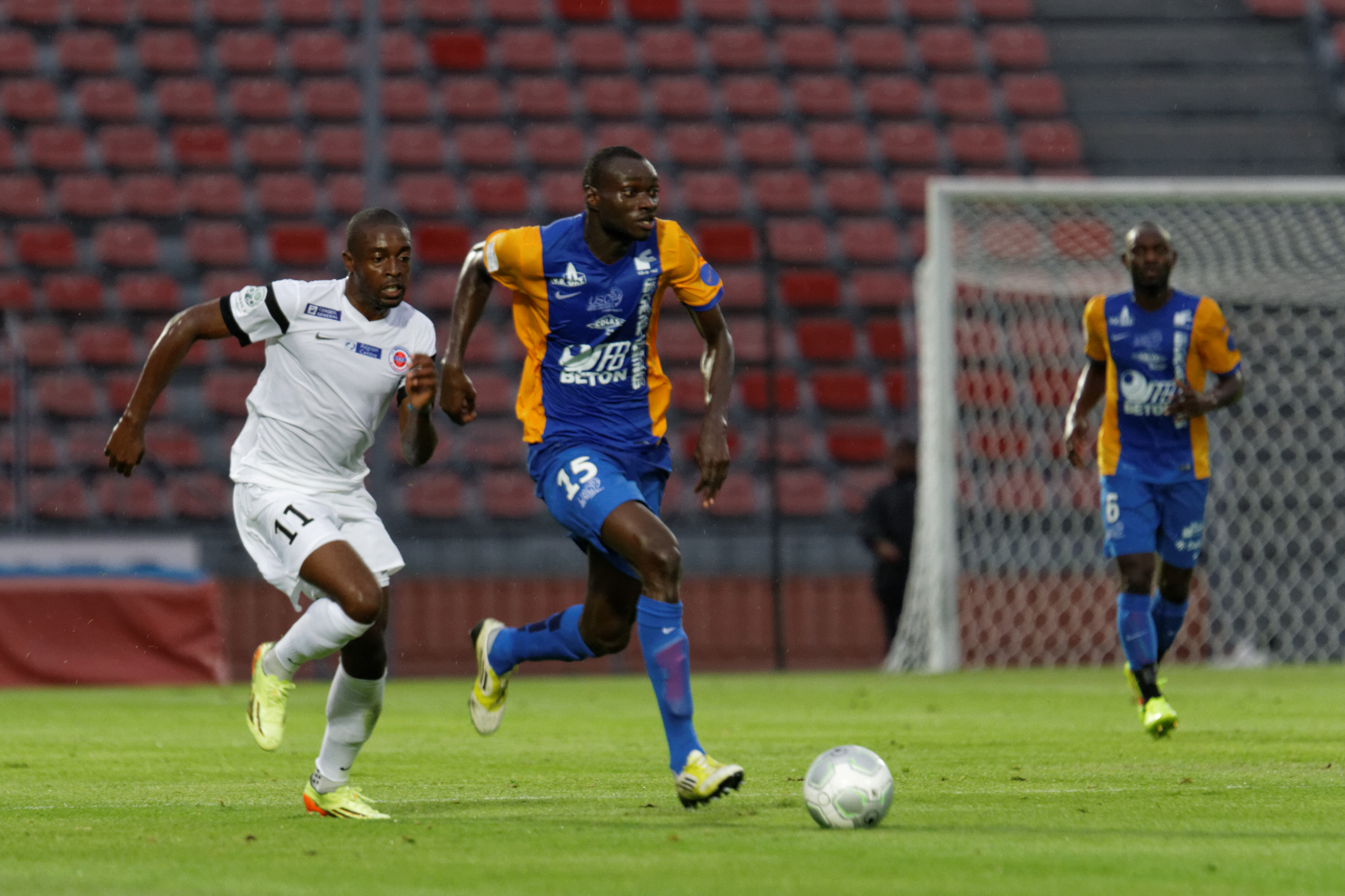
- Seck with Créteil in 2014

Personal information
- Full name: Ibrahima Khaliloulah Seck
- Date of birth: 10 August 1989 (age 37)
- Place of birth: Bargny, Senegal
- Height: 1.92 m (6 ft 4 in)
- Position: Defensive midfielder

Team information
- Current team: Lusitanos Saint-Maur
- Number: 15

Senior career*
Years	Team	Apps	(Gls)
2008–2009	Yakaar		
2009–2012	Épinal	84	(4)
2012–2015	Créteil	95	(10)
2015–2016	Auxerre	32	(2)
2016–2018	Waasland-Beveren	55	(7)
2018–2019	Genk	29	(1)
2019	→ Zulte Waregem (loan)	8	(0)
2019–2022	Zulte Waregem	77	(4)
2022–2025	Créteil	63	(8)
2025–	Lusitanos Saint-Maur	14	(4)

International career
2012	Senegal U23	1	(0)
2014–	Senegal	1	(0)
- * Club domestic league appearances and goals as of 7 February 2026

Ibrahima Khaliloulah Seck (born 10 August 1989) is a Senegalese professional footballer who plays as a defensive midfielder for French Championnat National 1 club Lusitanos Saint-Maur. He represented Senegal at the 2012 Summer Olympics.
