= Damien Marcq =

French footballer (born 1988)

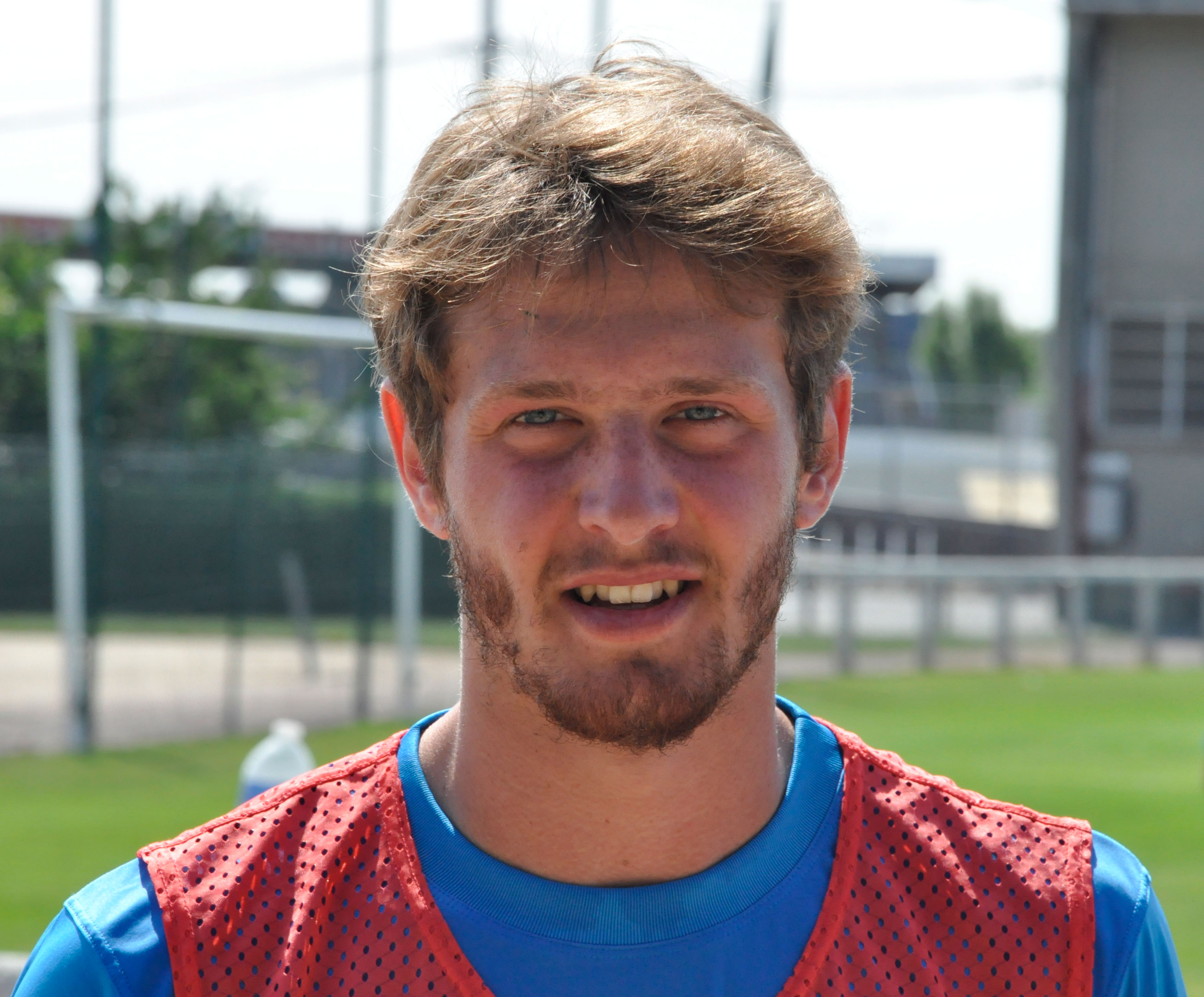
- Marcq in 2010

Personal information
- Date of birth: 8 December 1988 (age 37)
- Place of birth: Boulogne-sur-Mer, France
- Height: 1.83 m (6 ft 0 in)
- Positions: Defender; midfielder

Youth career
- 1996–2006: Boulogne

Senior career*
Years	Team	Apps	(Gls)
2006–2010	Boulogne	97	(1)
2010–2013	Caen	28	(0)
2011–2012	→ Dijon (loan)	14	(0)
2012–2013	→ Sedan (loan)	26	(0)
2013–2017	Charleroi	96	(2)
2017–2018	Gent	6	(0)
2018–2021	Zulte Waregem	63	(2)
2021–2022	Union SG	28	(0)
2022–2024	Charleroi	39	(2)

International career
2009–2010	France U21	4	(0)
- * Club domestic league appearances and goals as of 08:25, 28 July 2024 (UTC)

Damien Marcq (born 8 December 1988) is a French professional footballer who most recently played for Belgian club Charleroi. He can play in the defending position, as well as in the midfield.

== Club career ==
Marcq spent his entire youth career at his hometown club Boulogne which he joined in 1996. He came up through the ranks of the youth system and joined the club's first team in 2006, while they were playing in third tier Championnat National. He made his club debut during the 2006–07 Championnat National season appearing as a late match substitute in a 1–0 victory over Louhans-Cuiseaux. He would make eleven more appearances contributing to Boulogne's promotion to Ligue 2 for the 2006–07 season. Boulogne spent two seasons in Ligue 2 making 63 league appearances before earning promotion to Ligue 1 for the 2009–10 season. On 10 September 2009, Marcq signed a two-year contract extension.

On 28 June 2010, Marcq completed a transfer to newly promoted Ligue 1 club Caen having agreed to a three-year contract while Caen paid Boulogne a transfer fee of €2 million.

In June 2012, Marcq joined Sedan on loan.

With his three-year contract with Caen expiring, Marcq signed a two-year contract with Belgian Pro League side Charleroi in June 2013.

On 7 July 2021, he joined Union SG on a one-year contract with an optional second year.

On 14 July 2022, Marcq returned to Charleroi on a one-year contract.

== International career ==
On 25 May 2009, Marcq was called up, for the first time, to the France under-21 team that participated in the Toulon Tournament. He made his under-21 debut in the tournament in the squad's final group stage match against Chile.
