= Abdoulaye Sissako =

Ugandan footballer (born 1998)

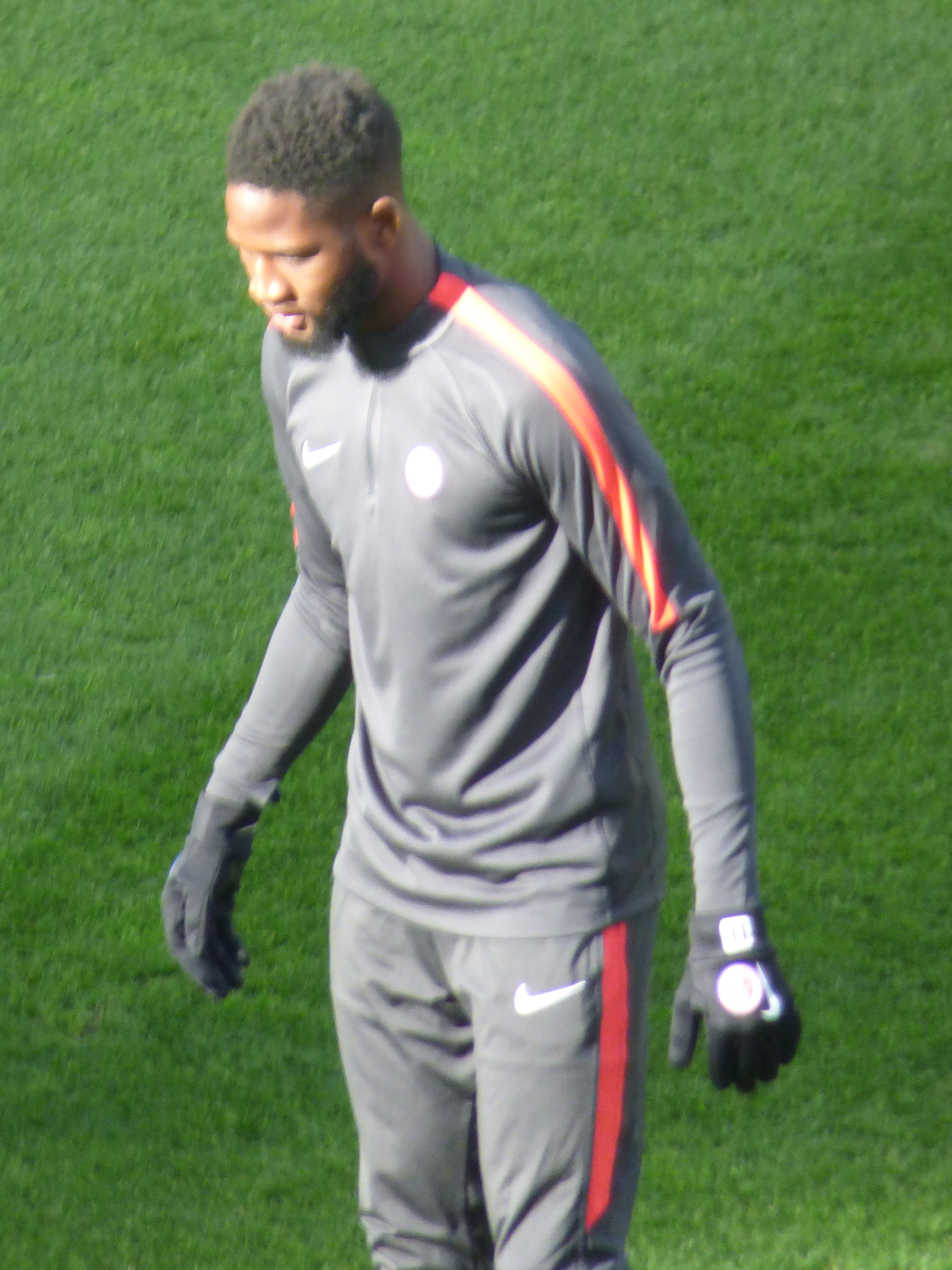
- Sissako with Châteauroux in 2018

Personal information
- Date of birth: 26 May 1998 (age 28)
- Place of birth: Clichy, France
- Height: 1.81 m (5 ft 11 in)
- Position: Midfielder

Team information
- Current team: Sint-Truiden
- Number: 8

Youth career
- 2004–2012: RC France
- 2012–2016: Auxerre

Senior career*
Years	Team	Apps	(Gls)
2015–2018	Auxerre B	33	(1)
2016–2018	Auxerre	13	(0)
2018–2019	Châteauroux	23	(2)
2018–2019	Châteauroux B	3	(0)
2019–2023	Zulte Waregem	89	(4)
2023–2025	Kortrijk	62	(2)
2025–	Sint-Truiden	40	(2)

International career^{‡}
2016	France U18	6	(1)
2016–2017	France U19	14	(0)
2026–	Uganda	2	(0)
- * Club domestic league appearances and goals ‡ National team caps and goals as of 5 October 2026

Abdoulaye Sissako (born 26 May 1998) is a professional footballer who plays as a midfielder for Belgian Pro League club Sint-Truiden. Born in France, he plays for the Uganda national team.

== Club career ==
In August 2023, Sissako joined Kortrijk on a four-year deal.

On 2 June 2025, Sissako moved to Sint-Truiden.

== International career ==
Sissako was a youth international for France in the past, playing at U18 and U19 level.

He made his debut for Uganda registering an assist in a 2-0 win friendly match against DR Congo on 02 October 2026 at the FNB stadium in Johannesburg South Africa.

== Personal life ==
Sissako was born in France and is of Malian descent. One of his brothers, Moussa, is also a footballer, and his other brother, Souleymane, is his adviser.

Sissako is also of Ugandan descent and his grandmother having been born in Uganda. His grandmother being born in Uganda would make Sissako eligible to play for the Uganda
