= Louis Bostyn =

Belgian footballer (born 1993)

Personal information
- Date of birth: 4 October 1993 (age 33)
- Place of birth: Roeselare, Belgium
- Height: 1.95 m (6 ft 5 in)
- Position: Goalkeeper

Team information
- Current team: Zulte Waregem
- Number: 1

Youth career
- 1999–2002: De Ruiter Roeselare
- 2002–2012: Roeselare

Senior career*
Years	Team	Apps	(Gls)
2012–2014	Roeselare	5	(0)
2014–	Zulte Waregem	81	(0)
- * Club domestic league appearances and goals as of 1 April 2024

Louis Bostyn (born 4 October 1993) is a Belgian professional footballer who plays for S.V. Zulte Waregem in the Belgian Pro League as a goalkeeper.

== Career ==
Bostyn played two seasons in the Belgian Second Division with K.S.V. Roeselare. In July 2014 he joined S.V. Zulte Waregem in the Belgian Pro League. He made his first team debut at 17 July 2014 in the UEFA Europa League qualifying round against Zawisza Bydgoszcz.
