= Elindus Arena =

Football stadium in Waregen, Belgium

Coordinates: 50°52′59″N 3°25′44″E

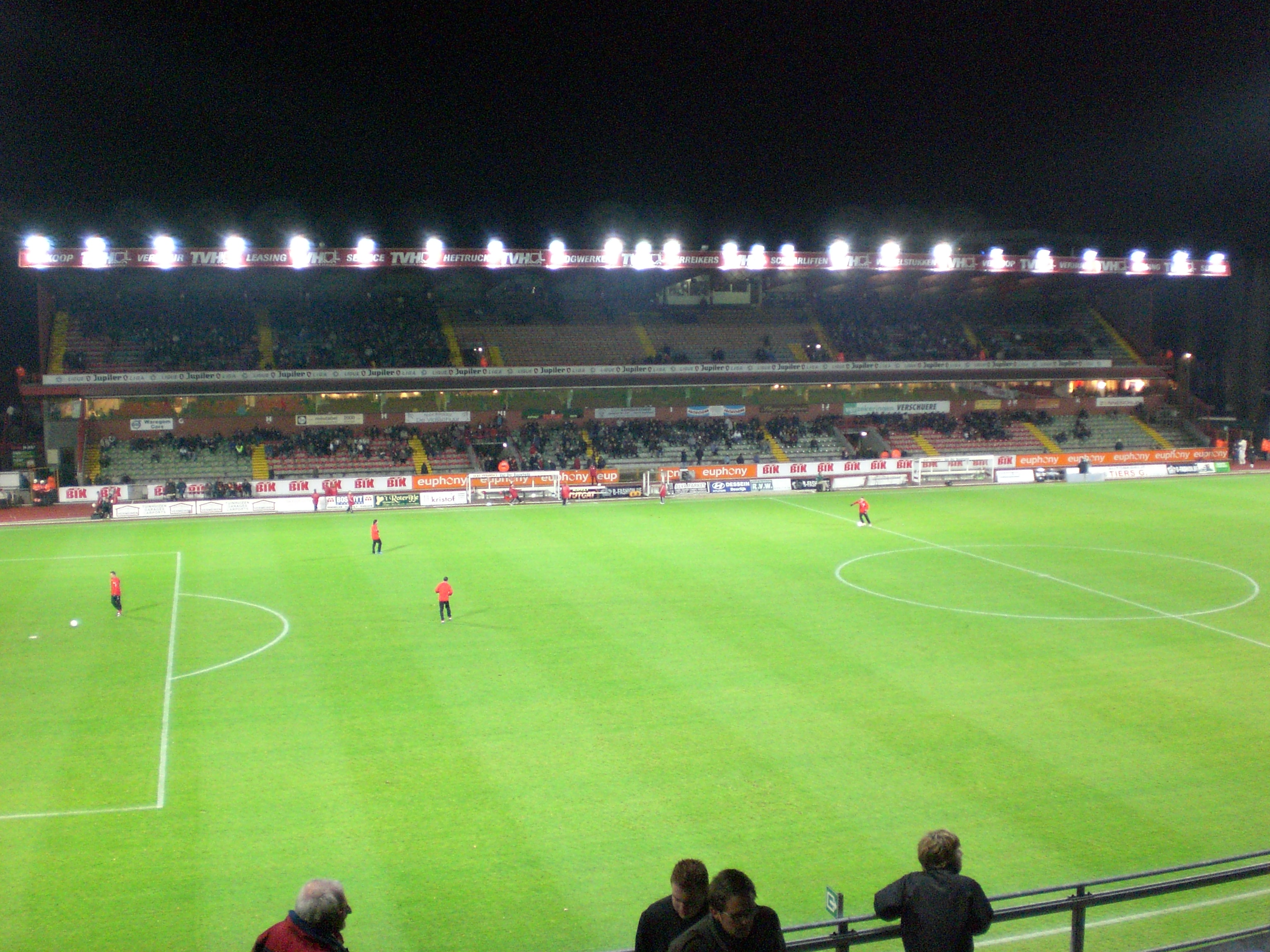
- Interactive map of Elindus Arena
- Location: Waregem, Belgium
- Capacity: 12,414
- Surface: Grass

Construction
- Opened: 1957

Tenant
- S.V. Zulte-Waregem

The Elindus Arena, formerly named the Regenboogstadion (Dutch pronunciation: [ˈreːɣə(m)boːxˌstaːdijɔn]; "Rainbow Stadium"), is a stadium in Waregem, Belgium. It is currently used mostly for football matches and is the home ground of S.V. Zulte-Waregem. The stadium was originally named after the rainbow jersey worn by the cycling road world champions, since it was inaugurated to host the 1957 UCI Road World Championships. From the 2020–21 season however, the stadium name changed to Elindus Arena, after a local sponsor.
