= 2019–20 Oud-Heverlee Leuven season =

Oud-Heverlee Leuven
2019–20 season
- Owner: King Power International Group
- Chairman: Aiyawatt Srivaddhanaprabha
- Manager: Vincent Euvrard
- Stadium: King Power at Den Dreef Stadium
- Belgian First Division B: 3rd (promoted)
- Belgian Cup: Round 6
- Top goalscorer: League: Thomas Henry (15 goals); All: Thomas Henry (16 goals)
| Home colours | Away colours |

The 2019–20 season was Oud-Heverlee Leuven's 18th competitive season in professional football and the team's fourth consecutive season at the second level following their relegation from the Belgian Pro League in 2016. By clinching the first half of the season title in November 2019, Oud-Heverlee Leuven qualified for the promotion play-offs to play for the overall title and promotion, in which they faced Beerschot, who won the second half of the season.

After the first leg of the promotion final was played, which the club lost 1–0, the second leg at home was postponed due to the COVID-19 pandemic. Mid-May, the Belgian association of professional football clubs decided that the second leg should take place behind closed doors in the first weekend of August to determine the champion and promoting team, on 2 August 2020. Eventually however, on 31 July 2020, just two days before the actual final match, the decision was overturned and instead the 2020–21 Belgian First Division A would be expanded to 18 (from 16) teams, meaning both OH Leuven and Beerschot would be promoted. While both clubs had already clinched promotion because of this, the second leg of the promotional final was still played (behind closed doors), with Beerschot winning again and taking the overall title.

== 2019–20 squad ==
- This section lists players who were in Oud-Heveree Leuven's first team squad at any point during the 2019–20 season
- The symbol ℒ indicates a player who is on loan from another club
- The symbol ¥ indicates a youngster who has appeared on the match sheet at least once during the season (possibly as unused substitute)

| No. | Nationality | Name | Position | Joined First Team | Previous club | Left First Team |
Goalkeepers
| 1 | (Thailand) | Kawin Thamsatchanan | GK | 10 January 2018 | (Thailand) Muangthong United | 8 February 2020 |
| 16 | (South Africa) | Darren Keet | GK | 31 July 2019 | (South Africa) Bidvest Wits | – |
| 26 | (Belgium) | Laurent Henkinet | GK | 27 December 2016 | (Belgium) Waasland-Beveren | – |
| 38 | (Belgium) | Oregan Ravet^{¥} | GK | Summer 2019 | Youth Squad | – |
Defenders
| 2 | (Belgium) | Jan Van den Bergh^{ℒ} | CB | 31 January 2020 | (Belgium) Gent | 30 June 2020 |
| 3 | (Belgium) / (Democratic Republic of the Congo) | Derrick Tshimanga | LB | 14 July 2017 | (Netherlands) Willem II | – |
| 4 | (Belgium) | Kenneth Schuermans | CB | 19 May 2017 | (Belgium) Westerlo | – |
| 5 | (Belgium) | Pierre-Yves Ngawa | RB | 11 August 2019 | (Italy) Perugia | – |
| 15 | (Burkina Faso) | Dylan Ouédraogo | CB | 28 August 2019 | (Cyprus) Apollon Limassol | – |
| 19 | (France) | Frédéric Duplus | RB | 7 June 2018 | (France) Lens | – |
| 23 | (Germany) | Sascha Kotysch | CB | 16 January 2019 | (Belgium) Sint-Truiden | – |
| 27 | (Belgium) | Jordy Gillekens^{¥} | CB | Summer 2017 | Youth Squad | – |
| 28 | (Belgium) | Toon Raemaekers^{¥} | CB | Summer 2019 | Youth Squad | – |
| 31 | (Belgium) | Brent Laes^{¥} | LB / LW | Summer 2019 | Youth Squad | – |
| 36 | (Senegal) | Thierno Gaye^{¥} | RB | Winter 2019–20 | Youth Squad | – |
Midfielders
| 6 | (Belgium) | David Hubert | CM | 18 August 2017 | (Belgium) Gent | – |
| 8 | (Belgium) | Tom Van Hyfte | CM | 10 July 2019 | (Belgium) Beerschot | – |
| 10 | (France) | Xavier Mercier | CM | 16 June 2019 | (Belgium) Cercle Brugge | – |
| 14 | (Ghana) | Kamal Sowah^{ℒ} | CM | 31 January 2018 | (England) Leicester City | 30 June 2020 |
| 17 | (France) | Samy Kehli | AM | 14 June 2018 | (Belgium) Lokeren | – |
| 20 | (Belgium) | Isaac Asante^{¥} | AM | Winter 2019–20 | Youth Squad | |
| 22 | (Belgium) | Olivier Myny | LW / RW | 31 May 2018 | (Belgium) Waasland-Beveren | – |
| 24 | (Canada) | Tristan Borges | CM / LW / RW | 22 January 2020 | (Canada) Forge FC | – |
| 24 | (Belgium) | Jarno Libert | CM | Summer 2017 | Youth Squad | 20 August 2019 |
| 25 | (Belgium) | Jenthe Mertens | CM | Summer 2017 | Youth Squad | 2 September 2019 |
| 29 | (Belgium) | Amîr Lemti^{¥} | CM | Summer 2019 | Youth Squad | – |
| 33 | (Belgium) | Mathieu Maertens | CM / AM | 12 July 2017 | (Belgium) Cercle Brugge | – |
| 77 | (France) | Yohan Croizet | LW / RW | 5 February 2020 | (United States) Sporting Kansas City | – |
| 99 | (Ivory Coast) | Aboubakar Keita | CM / DM | 31 January 2019 | (Denmark) Copenhagen | – |
Forwards
| 7 | (Benin) / (France) | Yannick Aguemon | CF / LW / RW | 28 June 2017 | (Belgium) Union SG | – |
| 8 | (Netherlands) | Sam Hendriks | CF | 6 July 2018 | (Netherlands) Go Ahead Eagles | 31 January 2020 |
| 9 | (France) | Thomas Henry | CF | 17 January 2019 | (Belgium) Tubize | – |
| 11 | (Belgium) | Yanis Mbombo | CF | 30 January 2019 | (Belgium) Excel Mouscron | – |
| 12 | (Belgium) | Stallone Limbombe | CF | 31 January 2020 | (Belgium) Gent | – |
| 18 | (Belgium) | Jo Gilis^{¥} | CF | Summer 2018 | Youth Squad | – |
| 30 | (Slovenia) | Milan Tučić | CF / LW / RW | 2 September 2019 | (Slovenia) Rudar Velenje | – |
| 32 | (Belgium) | Daan Vekemans^{¥} | CF | Summer 2018 | Youth Squad | – |
| 39 | (Belgium) | Arthur Allemeersch^{¥} | CF | Summer 2019 | Youth Squad | – |
| 43 | (France) | Jérémy Perbet^{ℒ} | CF | 2 September 2019 | (Belgium) Charleroi | 30 June 2020 |

== Transfers ==
May 2019 saw the first official transfer news published as midfielder Aboubakar Keita, who was already on loan from Copenhagen since the winter 2018–19 transfer window, was now signed permanently until 2022. Meanwhile, experienced midfielder Koen Persoons was announced as new signing by Belgian Second Amateur Division club Knokke. The first new player incoming was 29 year old French midfielder Xavier Mercier, who came over from Cercle Brugge where he had previously worked under the duo of Franky Vercauteren and Vincent Euvrard when they won the 2017–18 Belgian First Division B title and were promoted. That season Mercier also won the Belgian First Division B MVP award. Still before summer, OH Leuven also departed from Jovan Kostovski whose contract had ended after six seasons with the club, allowing him a free agent move to Cypriot team Ethnikos Achna.

With the season at an end, several players returned from loan deals: young strikers Jo Gilis and Daan Vekemans returned from Eendracht Aalst with which they had not been able to avoid relegation from the 2018–19 Belgian First Amateur Division. The duo would join the reserve squad for 2019–20. Dutch striker Sam Hendriks returned from Cambuur where he had been on good form until a serious knee injury saw him sidelined for the remainder of 2019. Winger Leo Njengo returned from a loan to Heist, but as he was end of contract he left the club, signing some weeks later for Visé. Also returning from loan deal was defender Jordy Gillekens who had been loaned to Fiorentina. Meanwhile, his goalkeeping brother Nick Gillekens was released after his contract ended, which was also the case for French midfielder Julien Gorius and Senegalese striker Simon Diedhiou. On the outgoing front, with their loan deals ending both Ahmed Touba and Jellert van Landschoot returned to Club Brugge after the season, similarly both Polish international Bartosz Kapustka and Elliott Moore returned to Leicester City F.C. Under-23s and Academy. Kapustka had in fact already returned a few months earlier to recover in Leicester from an injury ending his season while Moore was sold by Leicester City to Oxford United after two seasons on loan to OH Leuven. Kamal Sowah however remained with the squad, as it became clear his loan deal had been extended with one further season. On the other hand, English striker George Hirst was signed by Leicester City on a permanent basis.

In July, the club signed midfielder Tom Van Hyfte from direct competitors Beerschot and with Darren Keet brought in a new goalkeeper to replace Gillekens. Although South-African, Keet already has some five seasons of experience with the Belgian league as he played for Kortrijk from 2011 to 2016. Meanwhile, winger Joeri Dequevy moved to Belgian First Division team RWDM47. Mid August saw the return of former OH Leuven defender Pierre-Yves Ngawa who returned after playing in the Italian Serie B for two seasons, replacing Dimitri Daeseleire who left for Rupel Boom. With transfer deadline day approaching, several players who were deemed surplus found a solution by moving to a different team: Jarno Libert to RWDM47, Jenthe Mertens to Go Ahead Eagles and Redouane Kerrouche to Aves. Meanwhile, Burkinabé international Dylan Ouédraogo was brought in from Apollon Limassol as a backup defender. Finally, two last minute incoming transfers occurred with Slovenian winger/striker Milan Tučić being signed from Rudar Velenje and striker Jérémy Perbet arriving on loan from Charleroi.

During the 2019–20 winter transfer window, OH Leuven engaged in only few transfers. On the incoming side, midway through January, 21 year old Canadian Tristan Borges was brought in from Forge FC, while on transfer deadline day two more players came in from Gent: Jan Van den Bergh was loaned for 6-months (without buy clause) while Stallone Limbombe was signed until 2022. A few days after the transfer window had closed, former OHL player Yohan Croizet was signed as a free agent player, returning to the club after an earlier spell from 2014 to 2016. On the outgoing side, two players were sent out on loan: striker Sam Hendriks moved until the end of the season to Cambuur, where he had already been on loan the previous season; while Kawin Thamsatchanan was loaned out until the end of 2020 to Japanese team Hokkaido Consadole Sapporo.

=== Transfers In ===
| Date announced | Position | Nationality | Name | From | Fee | Ref. |
|---|---|---|---|---|---|---|
| 9 May 2019 | MF | (Ivory Coast) | Aboubakar Keita | (Denmark) Copenhagen | Undisclosed | (Note: Keita was already on loan from Copenhagen to OH Leuven during the second half of the 2018-19 season. All parties agreed to make the transfer permanent.) |
| End of 2018–19 season | FW | (Belgium) | Jo Gilis | (Belgium) Eendracht Aalst | Loan Return | |
| End of 2018–19 season | DF | (Belgium) | Jordy Gillekens | (Italy) Fiorentina | Loan Return | |
| End of 2018–19 season | FW | (Netherlands) | Sam Hendriks | (Netherlands) Cambuur | Loan Return | |
| End of 2018–19 season | MF | (Ghana) | Kamal Sowah | (England) Leicester City | Loan | (Note: Sowah was already on loan from Leicester City to OH Leuven during the 2018-19 season. The loan was extended with another season.) |
| End of 2018–19 season | FW | (Belgium) | Daan Vekemans | (Belgium) Eendracht Aalst | Loan Return | |
| 16 June 2019 | MF | (France) | Xavier Mercier | Cercle Brugge | Undisclosed | |
| 10 July 2019 | MF | (Belgium) | Tom Van Hyfte | Beerschot | Free | |
| 31 July 2019 | GK | (South Africa) | Darren Keet | Bidvest Wits | Undisclosed | |
| 11 August 2019 | DF | (Belgium) | Pierre-Yves Ngawa | Perugia | Free | |
| 25 August 2019 | DF | (Burkina Faso) | Dylan Ouédraogo | Apollon Limassol | Undisclosed | |
| 2 September 2019 | FW | France | Jérémy Perbet | Charleroi | Loan | |
| 2 September 2019 | FW | Slovenia | Milan Tučić | Rudar Velenje | Undisclosed | |
| 22 January 2020 | MF | Canada | Tristan Borges | Forge FC | Undisclosed | |
| 31 January 2020 | FW | Belgium | Stallone Limbombe | Gent | Undisclosed | |
| 31 January 2020 | DF | Belgium | Jan Van den Bergh | Gent | Loan | |
| 5 February 2020 | MF | France | Yohan Croizet | Free Agent | NA | |

=== Transfers Out ===
| Date announced | Position | Nationality | Name | To | Fee | Ref. |
|---|---|---|---|---|---|---|
| 24 May 2019 | MF | (Belgium) | Koen Persoons | Knokke | Undisclosed | |
| End of 2018–19 season | FW | Senegal | Simon Diedhiou | Free Agent | End of contract | |
| End of 2018–19 season | GK | Belgium | Nick Gillekens | Free Agent | End of contract | |
| End of 2018–19 season | MF | France | Julien Gorius | Free Agent | End of contract | |
| End of 2018–19 season | MF | (Poland) | Bartosz Kapustka | (England) Leicester City | Loan Return | |
| End of 2018–19 season | DF | (England) | Elliott Moore | (England) Leicester City | Loan Return | |
| End of 2018–19 season | DF | (Belgium) | Ahmed Touba | (Belgium) Club Brugge | Loan Return | |
| End of 2018–19 season | DF | (Belgium) | Jellert van Landschoot | (Belgium) Club Brugge | Loan Return | |
| 23 June 2019 | FW | North Macedonia | Jovan Kostovski | Ethnikos Achna | Free | |
| 5 July 2019 | FW | (England) | George Hirst | Leicester City | Undisclosed | |
| 29 July 2019 | MF | (Belgium) | Joeri Dequevy | RWDM47 | Free | |
| 11 August 2019 | MF | (Belgium) | Dimitri Daeseleire | Rupel Boom | Free | |
| 17 August 2019 | MF | (Belgium) | Leo Njengo | Visé | Free | |
| 20 August 2019 | MF | (Belgium) | Jarno Libert | RWDM47 | Undisclosed | |
| 25 August 2019 | MF | (France) | Redouane Kerrouche | Aves | Undisclosed | |
| 2 September 2019 | MF | (Belgium) | Jenthe Mertens | Go Ahead Eagles | Undisclosed | |
| 31 January 2020 | FW | (Netherlands) | Sam Hendriks | (Netherlands) Cambuur | Loan | |
| 8 February 2020 | GK | (Thailand) | Kawin Thamsatchanan | Hokkaido Consadole Sapporo | Loan | |

== Belgian First Division B ==
OHL's season in the Belgian First Division B began on 4 August 2018.

=== Results ===
2019–20 Belgian First Division B
| Match Details | Home team | Result | Away team | Lineup | Unused Subs | Bookings |
Opening tournament
| 3 August 2019; 17:00; King Power at Den Dreef Stadium; Leuven; Attendance: 3.624; Report | Oud-Heverlee Leuven | 1–0 | Virton | Henkinet; Tshimanga, Schuermans, Kotysch, Gillekens (67' Kehli), Duplus; Aguemon, Keita, Maertens (67' Van Hyfte), Mercier (82' Sowah); Henry | Thamsatchanan; Laes; Libert; Myny | |
| 3 August 2019; 17:00; King Power at Den Dreef Stadium; Leuven; Attendance: 3.624; Report | 90+1' Henry | 1–0 | | Henkinet; Tshimanga, Schuermans, Kotysch, Gillekens (67' Kehli), Duplus; Aguemon, Keita, Maertens (67' Van Hyfte), Mercier (82' Sowah); Henry | Thamsatchanan; Laes; Libert; Myny | |
| 9 August 2019; 20:30; Het Kuipje; Westerlo; Attendance: 3.200 | Westerlo | 1–0 | Oud-Heverlee Leuven | Henkinet; Tshimanga, Keita (83' Sowah), Schuermans, Kotysch, Duplus; Aguemon (67' Myny), Kehli, Maertens, Mercier (67' Van Hyfte); Henry | Thamsatchanan; Gillekens; Laes; Libert | (yellow card) 17' Keita; (yellow card) 83' Henry |
| 9 August 2019; 20:30; Het Kuipje; Westerlo; Attendance: 3.200 | 60' Abrahams | 1–0 | | Henkinet; Tshimanga, Keita (83' Sowah), Schuermans, Kotysch, Duplus; Aguemon (67' Myny), Kehli, Maertens, Mercier (67' Van Hyfte); Henry | Thamsatchanan; Gillekens; Laes; Libert | (yellow card) 17' Keita; (yellow card) 83' Henry |
| 16 August 2019; 20:30; King Power at Den Dreef Stadium; Leuven | Oud-Heverlee Leuven | 3–0 | Beerschot | Henkinet; Tshimanga, Kotysch, Schuermans, Duplus; Keita, Mercier (70' Kehli), Van Hyfte (81' Sowah); Maertens, Henry, Myny (54' Aguemon) | Thamsatchanan; Gillekens; Laes; Mbombo | (yellow card) 26' Keita |
| 16 August 2019; 20:30; King Power at Den Dreef Stadium; Leuven | 13' Kotysch; 24' Maertens; 53' Henry | 1–0; 2–0; 3–0 | | Henkinet; Tshimanga, Kotysch, Schuermans, Duplus; Keita, Mercier (70' Kehli), Van Hyfte (81' Sowah); Maertens, Henry, Myny (54' Aguemon) | Thamsatchanan; Gillekens; Laes; Mbombo | (yellow card) 26' Keita |
| 31 August 2019; 20:30; Daknamstadion; Lokeren | Lokeren | 0–2 | Oud-Heverlee Leuven | Henkinet; Tshimanga, Kotysch, Schuermans, Duplus; Keita, Mercier (73' Ngawa), Van Hyfte; Maertens, Henry (60' Allemeersch), Aguemon (85' Sowah) | Keet; Hubert; Kehli; Laes | (yellow card) 21' Keita; (yellow card) 74' Ngawa |
| 31 August 2019; 20:30; Daknamstadion; Lokeren | | 0–1; 0–2 | 29' Henry; 33' Maertens | Henkinet; Tshimanga, Kotysch, Schuermans, Duplus; Keita, Mercier (73' Ngawa), Van Hyfte; Maertens, Henry (60' Allemeersch), Aguemon (85' Sowah) | Keet; Hubert; Kehli; Laes | (yellow card) 21' Keita; (yellow card) 74' Ngawa |
| 7 September 2019; 20:30; King Power at Den Dreef Stadium; Leuven | Oud-Heverlee Leuven | 4–0 | Roeselare | Henkinet; Tshimanga, Kotysch, Schuermans, Duplus; Hubert, Mercier, Van Hyfte (72' Mbombo); Maertens, Henry (80' Perbet), Sowah (80' Kehli) | Keet; Gilis; Gillekens; Laes | |
| 7 September 2019; 20:30; King Power at Den Dreef Stadium; Leuven | 1' Sowah; 18' Maertens; 39' Maertens; 74' Mbombo | 1–0; 2–0; 3–0; 4–0 | | Henkinet; Tshimanga, Kotysch, Schuermans, Duplus; Hubert, Mercier, Van Hyfte (72' Mbombo); Maertens, Henry (80' Perbet), Sowah (80' Kehli) | Keet; Gilis; Gillekens; Laes | |
| 14 September 2019; 17:00; Stade Joseph Marien; Forest, Brussels | Union SG | 1–1 | Oud-Heverlee Leuven | Henkinet; Tshimanga, Kotysch, Schuermans, Duplus; Keita, Mercier, Van Hyfte (89' Aguemon); Maertens, Henry (60' Perbet), Sowah | Keet; Kehli; Ngawa; Perbet | |
| 14 September 2019; 17:00; Stade Joseph Marien; Forest, Brussels | 54' Nielsen | 1–0; 1–1 | 82' Henry (p) | Henkinet; Tshimanga, Kotysch, Schuermans, Duplus; Keita, Mercier, Van Hyfte (89' Aguemon); Maertens, Henry (60' Perbet), Sowah | Keet; Kehli; Ngawa; Perbet | |
| 22 September 2019; 16:00; King Power at Den Dreef Stadium; Leuven | Oud-Heverlee Leuven | 1–0 | Lommel | Henkinet; Tshimanga (72' Aguemon), Hubert, Schuermans, Duplus; Keita, Mercier, Van Hyfte (61' Tučić); Maertens, Henry (80' Perbet), Sowah | Keet; Gillekens; Kehli; Ngawa | (yellow card) 47' Keita; (yellow card) 74' Hubert |
| 22 September 2019; 16:00; King Power at Den Dreef Stadium; Leuven | 82' Perbet | 1–0 | | Henkinet; Tshimanga (72' Aguemon), Hubert, Schuermans, Duplus; Keita, Mercier, Van Hyfte (61' Tučić); Maertens, Henry (80' Perbet), Sowah | Keet; Gillekens; Kehli; Ngawa | (yellow card) 47' Keita; (yellow card) 74' Hubert |
| 28 September 2019; 20:30; Olympisch Stadion; Antwerp | Beerschot | 1–2 | Oud-Heverlee Leuven | Henkinet; Tshimanga, Ngawa, Schuermans, Duplus; Keita, Mercier (46' Mbombo), Van Hyfte (88' Kehli); Maertens, Henry, Sowah (72' Gillekens) | Keet; Aguemon; Perbet; Raemaekers | (yellow card) 27' Mercier; (yellow card) 67' Tshimanga; (yellow card) 78' (yellow-red card) 80' Henry |
| 28 September 2019; 20:30; Olympisch Stadion; Antwerp | 72' Holzhauser (p) | 0–1; 0–2; 1–2 | 20' Maertens; 69' Mbombo | Henkinet; Tshimanga, Ngawa, Schuermans, Duplus; Keita, Mercier (46' Mbombo), Van Hyfte (88' Kehli); Maertens, Henry, Sowah (72' Gillekens) | Keet; Aguemon; Perbet; Raemaekers | (yellow card) 27' Mercier; (yellow card) 67' Tshimanga; (yellow card) 78' (yellow-red card) 80' Henry |
| 5 October 2019; 20:30; King Power at Den Dreef Stadium; Leuven | Oud-Heverlee Leuven | 2–3 | Lokeren | Henkinet; Tshimanga, Ngawa, Schuermans, Duplus; Maertens, Keita, Van Hyfte (83' Mercier), Sowah (46' Kehli); Mbombo (76' Aguemon), Perbet | Keet; Allemeersch; Gillekens; Ouédraogo | (yellow card) 60' Maertens |
| 5 October 2019; 20:30; King Power at Den Dreef Stadium; Leuven | 26' Perbet 43' Van Hyfte | 0–1; 1–1; 1–2; 2–2; 2–3 | 8' Hajrić 35' Navarro 75' Koike | Henkinet; Tshimanga, Ngawa, Schuermans, Duplus; Maertens, Keita, Van Hyfte (83' Mercier), Sowah (46' Kehli); Mbombo (76' Aguemon), Perbet | Keet; Allemeersch; Gillekens; Ouédraogo | (yellow card) 60' Maertens |
| 12 October 2019; 17:00; Schiervelde Stadion; Roeselare | Roeselare | 3–1 | Oud-Heverlee Leuven | Henkinet; Tshimanga, Ngawa, Schuermans, Duplus; Keita, Mercier, Van Hyfte (40' Mbombo); Maertens, Perbet (40' Henry), Kehli (76' Gilis) | Ravet; Gillekens; Lemti; Vekemans | (yellow card) 61' Keita; (yellow card) 85' Schuermans |
| 12 October 2019; 17:00; Schiervelde Stadion; Roeselare | 23' Voet; 30' Andzouana; 33' Naessens | 1–0; 2–0; 3–0; 3–1 | 90' Henry | Henkinet; Tshimanga, Ngawa, Schuermans, Duplus; Keita, Mercier, Van Hyfte (40' Mbombo); Maertens, Perbet (40' Henry), Kehli (76' Gilis) | Ravet; Gillekens; Lemti; Vekemans | (yellow card) 61' Keita; (yellow card) 85' Schuermans |
| 20 October 2019; 16:00; Soevereinstadion; Lommel | Lommel | 0–2 | Oud-Heverlee Leuven | Henkinet; Tshimanga, Ngawa, Schuermans, Gillekens, Duplus; Maertens, Mbombo (46' Aguemon), Mercier (46' Sowah), Van Hyfte; Henry (90' Perbet) | Keet; Laes; Lemti; Ouédraogo | (yellow card) 73' Maertens |
| 20 October 2019; 16:00; Soevereinstadion; Lommel | | 0–1; 0–2 | 74' Van Hyfte; 86' Henry | Henkinet; Tshimanga, Ngawa, Schuermans, Gillekens, Duplus; Maertens, Mbombo (46' Aguemon), Mercier (46' Sowah), Van Hyfte; Henry (90' Perbet) | Keet; Laes; Lemti; Ouédraogo | (yellow card) 73' Maertens |
| 25 October 2019; 20:30; King Power at Den Dreef Stadium; Leuven | Oud-Heverlee Leuven | 2–1 | Westerlo | Henkinet; Aguemon, Tshimanga, Ngawa, Schuermans, Duplus; Keita, Maertens, Sowah (90+2' Gillekens), Van Hyfte (80' Mbombo); Henry | Keet; Laes; Ouédraogo; Perbet; Tučić | (yellow card) 57' Duplus; (red card) 82' Keita; (yellow card) 86' Maertens; (yellow card) 90+4' Henry |
| 25 October 2019; 20:30; King Power at Den Dreef Stadium; Leuven | 23' Sowah; 28' Henry | 1–0; 2–0; 2–1 | 33' Antunes | Henkinet; Aguemon, Tshimanga, Ngawa, Schuermans, Duplus; Keita, Maertens, Sowah (90+2' Gillekens), Van Hyfte (80' Mbombo); Henry | Keet; Laes; Ouédraogo; Perbet; Tučić | (yellow card) 57' Duplus; (red card) 82' Keita; (yellow card) 86' Maertens; (yellow card) 90+4' Henry |
| 1 November 2019; 20:30; King Power at Den Dreef Stadium; Leuven | Oud-Heverlee Leuven | Stopped (Note: On 1 November 2019 the match between OH Leuven and Union SG was stopped during the second half at a 0–0 scoreline, when part of the floodlights in the stadium stopped working. The lights had been malfunctioning several times throughout the match and when the total time of delay exceeded 30 minutes the referee had to stop the match as per the rules of the Belgian FA. After investigations, the commission of the Belgian FA ruled on 2 January 2020 that OHL was to lose the match by a forfeit score of 0–5. OH Leuven appealed the decision at the Belgian court for sports arbitrage (BAS) which ruled on 31 January 2020 that the match needed to be replayed in full as the club could not be deemed accountable for the floodlight failure and the referee had insufficiently motivated his decision to stop the match. The match was replayed on 11 February 2020.) | Union SG | | | |
| 8 November 2019; 20:30; Stade Yvan Georges; Virton | Virton | 0–1 | Oud-Heverlee Leuven | Henkinet; Aguemon, Tshimanga (75' Kotysch), Ngawa, Schuermans, Duplus; Maertens (87' Kehli), Mercier, Sowah (78' Mbombo), Van Hyfte; Henry | Keet; Gillekens; Ouédraogo; Perbet | (yellow card) 13' Maertens; (yellow card) 85' Van Hyfte; (yellow card) 90+5' Mbombo |
| 8 November 2019; 20:30; Stade Yvan Georges; Virton | | 0–1 | 19' Henry | Henkinet; Aguemon, Tshimanga (75' Kotysch), Ngawa, Schuermans, Duplus; Maertens (87' Kehli), Mercier, Sowah (78' Mbombo), Van Hyfte; Henry | Keet; Gillekens; Ouédraogo; Perbet | (yellow card) 13' Maertens; (yellow card) 85' Van Hyfte; (yellow card) 90+5' Mbombo |
Closing tournament
| 15 November 2019; 20:30; King Power at Den Dreef Stadium; Leuven | Oud-Heverlee Leuven | 0–3 | Beerschot | Henkinet; Tshimanga, Kotysch (34' Gillekens (59' Mbombo)), Schuermans, Ngawa, Duplus; Maertens, Mercier (58' Perbet), Van Hyfte; Henry, Sowah | Ravet; Kehli; Raemaekers; Tučić | (yellow card) 89' Duplus |
| 15 November 2019; 20:30; King Power at Den Dreef Stadium; Leuven | | 0–1; 0–2; 0–3 | 48' Holzhauser; 53' Noubissi; 60' Vancamp | Henkinet; Tshimanga, Kotysch (34' Gillekens (59' Mbombo)), Schuermans, Ngawa, Duplus; Maertens, Mercier (58' Perbet), Van Hyfte; Henry, Sowah | Ravet; Kehli; Raemaekers; Tučić | (yellow card) 89' Duplus |
| 22 November 2019; 20:30; Het Kuipje; Westerlo | Westerlo | 1–2 | Oud-Heverlee Leuven | Henkinet; Aguemon, Tshimanga, Schuermans, Ngawa, Duplus; Maertens, Mercier (86' Mbombo), Van Hyfte; Henry, Sowah (86' Kehli) | Keet; Gillekens; Ouédraogo; Perbet; Tučić | |
| 22 November 2019; 20:30; Het Kuipje; Westerlo | 10' Brüls | 1–0; 1–1; 1–2 | 28' Mercier; 41' Schuermans | Henkinet; Aguemon, Tshimanga, Schuermans, Ngawa, Duplus; Maertens, Mercier (86' Mbombo), Van Hyfte; Henry, Sowah (86' Kehli) | Keet; Gillekens; Ouédraogo; Perbet; Tučić | |
| 29 November 2019; 20:30; King Power at Den Dreef Stadium; Leuven | Oud-Heverlee Leuven | 2–1 | Lokeren | Henkinet; Aguemon, Tshimanga, Ngawa, Schuermans, Duplus; Maertens, Mercier (76' Keita), Van Hyfte; Henry, Sowah (88' Kehli) | Keet; Gillekens; Mbombo; Ouédraogo; Perbet | |
| 29 November 2019; 20:30; King Power at Den Dreef Stadium; Leuven | 51' Henry; 65' Mercier | 1–0; 2–0; 2–1 | 90+1' Koike | Henkinet; Aguemon, Tshimanga, Ngawa, Schuermans, Duplus; Maertens, Mercier (76' Keita), Van Hyfte; Henry, Sowah (88' Kehli) | Keet; Gillekens; Mbombo; Ouédraogo; Perbet | |
| 6 December 2019; 20:30; Soevereinstadion; Lommel | Lommel | 3–2 | Oud-Heverlee Leuven | Henkinet; Aguemon (82' Perbet), Tshimanga, Ngawa, Schuermans, Duplus (72' Mbombo); Maertens, Mercier, Van Hyfte; Henry, Sowah (72' Myny) | Keet; Gillekens; Kehli; Ouédraogo | (red card) 19' Tshimanga; (yellow card) 40' Ngawa; (yellow card) 44' Aguemon |
| 6 December 2019; 20:30; Soevereinstadion; Lommel | 21' Hendrickx (p) 44' Hendrickx (p); 64' Sanyang | 1–0; 1–1; 2–1; 3–1; 3–2 | 35' Aguemon 77' Maertens | Henkinet; Aguemon (82' Perbet), Tshimanga, Ngawa, Schuermans, Duplus (72' Mbombo); Maertens, Mercier, Van Hyfte; Henry, Sowah (72' Myny) | Keet; Gillekens; Kehli; Ouédraogo | (red card) 19' Tshimanga; (yellow card) 40' Ngawa; (yellow card) 44' Aguemon |
| 13 December 2019; 20:30; Schiervelde Stadion; Roeselare | Roeselare | 2–2 | Oud-Heverlee Leuven | Henkinet; Aguemon, Tshimanga, Ngawa, Schuermans, Duplus; Maertens, Mercier, Van Hyfte (78' Perbet); Henry (83' Mbombo), Sowah (72' Keita) | Keet; Kotysch; Myny; Ouédraogo | (yellow card) 74' Ngawa; (yellow card) 90+4' Mercier |
| 13 December 2019; 20:30; Schiervelde Stadion; Roeselare | 38' Casagolda 70' Nouri | 0–1; 1–1; 1–2; 2–2 | 14' Henry 54' Sowah | Henkinet; Aguemon, Tshimanga, Ngawa, Schuermans, Duplus; Maertens, Mercier, Van Hyfte (78' Perbet); Henry (83' Mbombo), Sowah (72' Keita) | Keet; Kotysch; Myny; Ouédraogo | (yellow card) 74' Ngawa; (yellow card) 90+4' Mercier |
| 21 December 2019; 20:30; King Power at Den Dreef Stadium; Leuven | Oud-Heverlee Leuven | 0–2 | Virton | Keet; Aguemon, Tshimanga, Schuermans, Ngawa (73' Perbet), Duplus; Keita, Maertens, Mercier (59' Mbombo); Henry, Sowah (73' Myny) | Henkinet; Gillekens; Ouédraogo; Van Hyfte | |
| 21 December 2019; 20:30; King Power at Den Dreef Stadium; Leuven | | 0–1; 0–2 | 66' Joachim; 90+3' Turpel | Keet; Aguemon, Tshimanga, Schuermans, Ngawa (73' Perbet), Duplus; Keita, Maertens, Mercier (59' Mbombo); Henry, Sowah (73' Myny) | Henkinet; Gillekens; Ouédraogo; Van Hyfte | |
| 11 January 2020; 20:30; Stade Joseph Marien; Forest, Brussels | Union SG | 2–3 | Oud-Heverlee Leuven | Keet (62' Henkinet); Aguemon (80' Perbet), Tshimanga, Schuermans, Ngawa, Duplus; Keita, Maertens, Mercier; Henry, Sowah (71' Myny) | Hubert; Mbombo; Ouédraogo; Van Hyfte | (yellow card) 45' Aguemon; (yellow card) 82' Henry |
| 11 January 2020; 20:30; Stade Joseph Marien; Forest, Brussels | 64' Tabekou; 67' Perdichizzi | 0–1; 0–2; 1–2; 2–2; 2–3 | 4' Henry; 33' Maertens 90' Perbet | Keet (62' Henkinet); Aguemon (80' Perbet), Tshimanga, Schuermans, Ngawa, Duplus; Keita, Maertens, Mercier; Henry, Sowah (71' Myny) | Hubert; Mbombo; Ouédraogo; Van Hyfte | (yellow card) 45' Aguemon; (yellow card) 82' Henry |
| 19 January 2020; 16:00; King Power at Den Dreef Stadium; Leuven | Oud-Heverlee Leuven | 1–3 | Westerlo | Keet; Aguemon, Tshimanga, Schuermans, Ngawa (70' Myny), Duplus; Keita (77' Van Hyfte), Maertens, Mercier; Henry, Sowah (60' Perbet) | Henkinet; Hubert; Mbombo; Raemaekers | (yellow card) 40' Duplus; (yellow card) 89' Tshimanga |
| 19 January 2020; 16:00; King Power at Den Dreef Stadium; Leuven | 44' Mercier | 0–1; 1–1; 1–2; 1–3 | 27' Brüls 57' Dewaele; 90+4' Janssens | Keet; Aguemon, Tshimanga, Schuermans, Ngawa (70' Myny), Duplus; Keita (77' Van Hyfte), Maertens, Mercier; Henry, Sowah (60' Perbet) | Henkinet; Hubert; Mbombo; Raemaekers | (yellow card) 40' Duplus; (yellow card) 89' Tshimanga |
| 24 January 2020; 20:30; Daknamstadion; Lokeren | Lokeren | 1–1 | Oud-Heverlee Leuven | Keet; Tshimanga, Schuermans, Hubert, Duplus; Keita (78' Perbet), Mercier, Van Hyfte (70' Sowah); Aguemon, Henry, Maertens | Henkinet; Gilis; Myny; Ngawa; Raemaekers | (yellow card) 79' Maertens |
| 24 January 2020; 20:30; Daknamstadion; Lokeren | 10' Benchaib | 1–0; 1–1 | 65' Henry | Keet; Tshimanga, Schuermans, Hubert, Duplus; Keita (78' Perbet), Mercier, Van Hyfte (70' Sowah); Aguemon, Henry, Maertens | Henkinet; Gilis; Myny; Ngawa; Raemaekers | (yellow card) 79' Maertens |
| 1 February 2020; 20:30; King Power at Den Dreef Stadium; Leuven | Oud-Heverlee Leuven | 2–1 | Roeselare | Keet; Tshimanga, Schuermans, Hubert, Duplus; Keita, Mercier, Van Hyfte; Aguemon, Henry (88' Perbet), Sowah (80' Borges) | Henkinet; Mbombo; Myny; Ngawa; Van den Bergh | (yellow card) 68' Tshimanga |
| 1 February 2020; 20:30; King Power at Den Dreef Stadium; Leuven | 32' Van Hyfte; 33' Henry | 0–1; 1–1; 2–1 | 26' Nouri | Keet; Tshimanga, Schuermans, Hubert, Duplus; Keita, Mercier, Van Hyfte; Aguemon, Henry (88' Perbet), Sowah (80' Borges) | Henkinet; Mbombo; Myny; Ngawa; Van den Bergh | (yellow card) 68' Tshimanga |
| 8 February 2020; 17:00; King Power at Den Dreef Stadium; Leuven | Oud-Heverlee Leuven | 3–0 | Lommel | Keet; Tshimanga ('46 Ngawa), Schuermans, Van den Bergh ('79 Keita), Duplus; Maertens, Mercier, Van Hyfte; Aguemon, Henry (60' Perbet), Sowah | Henkinet; Borges; Mbombo; Myny | (yellow card) 68' Van den Bergh |
| 8 February 2020; 17:00; King Power at Den Dreef Stadium; Leuven | 29' Van den Bergh; 40' Tshimanga; 90+1' Perbet | 1–0; 2–0; 3–0 | | Keet; Tshimanga ('46 Ngawa), Schuermans, Van den Bergh ('79 Keita), Duplus; Maertens, Mercier, Van Hyfte; Aguemon, Henry (60' Perbet), Sowah | Henkinet; Borges; Mbombo; Myny | (yellow card) 68' Van den Bergh |
Opening tournament
| 11 February 2020; 20:30; King Power at Den Dreef Stadium; Leuven | Oud-Heverlee Leuven | 0–0 (Note: Full replay of match started on 1 November 2019.) | Union SG | Henkinet; Gaye, Schuermans, Raemaekers, Ngawa; Tučić, Keita (85' Van Hyfte), Maertens (70' Mercier), Myny; Mbombo (64' Aguemon), Perbet | Keet; Duplus; Henry; Ouédraogo | (yellow card) 55' (yellow-red card) 59' Gaye; (yellow card) 72' Keita |
Closing tournament
| 14 February 2020; 20:30; Olympisch Stadion; Antwerp | Beerschot | 2–1 | Oud-Heverlee Leuven | Henkinet; Tshimanga, Schuermans, Van den Bergh, Duplus (73' Borges); Maertens, Mercier, Van Hyfte (62' Perbet); Aguemon, Henry, Sowah | Keet; Hubert; Keita; Mbombo; Ngawa | (yellow card) 34' Maertens; (yellow card) 72' Aguemon |
| 14 February 2020; 20:30; Olympisch Stadion; Antwerp | 47' Tissoudali; 60' Frans | 1–0; 2–0; 2–1 | 79' Van den Bergh | Henkinet; Tshimanga, Schuermans, Van den Bergh, Duplus (73' Borges); Maertens, Mercier, Van Hyfte (62' Perbet); Aguemon, Henry, Sowah | Keet; Hubert; Keita; Mbombo; Ngawa | (yellow card) 34' Maertens; (yellow card) 72' Aguemon |
| 21 February 2020; 20:30; King Power at Den Dreef Stadium; Leuven | Oud-Heverlee Leuven | 3–5 | Union SG | Henkinet; Tshimanga, Schuermans, Van den Bergh, Duplus (67' Borges); Keita (67' Perbet), Mercier, Van Hyfte (46' Sowah); Aguemon, Henry, Maertens | Keet; Hubert; Mbombo; Ngawa | (yellow card) 63' Keita; (yellow card) 64' Tshimanga; (yellow card) 70' Henry |
| 21 February 2020; 20:30; King Power at Den Dreef Stadium; Leuven | 21' Henry 72' Maertens; 82' Henry | 0–1; 1–1; 1–2; 1–3; 2–3; 3–3; 3–4; 3–5 | 14' Nielsen 28' Sigurðarson; 31' Bah 84' Teuma; 90+3' Teuma (p) | Henkinet; Tshimanga, Schuermans, Van den Bergh, Duplus (67' Borges); Keita (67' Perbet), Mercier, Van Hyfte (46' Sowah); Aguemon, Henry, Maertens | Keet; Hubert; Mbombo; Ngawa | (yellow card) 63' Keita; (yellow card) 64' Tshimanga; (yellow card) 70' Henry |
| 28 February 2020; 20:30; Stade Yvan Georges; Virton | Virton | 4–1 | Oud-Heverlee Leuven | Henkinet; Van den Bergh, Kotysch (46' Ouédraogo), Hubert; Laes, Van Hyfte, Lemti, Myny; Tučić (60' Croizet), Mbombo, Borges (59' Perbet) | Keet; Asante; Gaye; Gillekens | |
| 28 February 2020; 20:30; Stade Yvan Georges; Virton | 16' Lapoussin; 42' Ribeiro 77' Joachim; 90+1' Joachim | 1–0; 2–0; 2–1; 3–1; 4–1 | 61' Perbet | Henkinet; Van den Bergh, Kotysch (46' Ouédraogo), Hubert; Laes, Van Hyfte, Lemti, Myny; Tučić (60' Croizet), Mbombo, Borges (59' Perbet) | Keet; Asante; Gaye; Gillekens | |
Promotion Play-offs
| 8 March 2020; 16:00; Olympisch Stadion; Antwerp | Beerschot | 1–0 | Oud-Heverlee Leuven | Henkinet; Tshimanga (46' Aguemon), Schuermans, Van den Bergh, Duplus, Ngawa (55' Hubert); Keita, Maertens, Sowah; Henry, Perbet (73' Mercier) | Keet; Croizet; Limbombe; Van Hyfte | (yellow card) 55' Hubert |
| 8 March 2020; 16:00; Olympisch Stadion; Antwerp | 22' Tissoudali | 1–0 | | Henkinet; Tshimanga (46' Aguemon), Schuermans, Van den Bergh, Duplus, Ngawa (55' Hubert); Keita, Maertens, Sowah; Henry, Perbet (73' Mercier) | Keet; Croizet; Limbombe; Van Hyfte | (yellow card) 55' Hubert |
| 14 March 2020; 20:30; King Power at Den Dreef Stadium; Leuven | Oud-Heverlee Leuven | 1–4 | Beerschot | Keet; Aguemon (46' Limbombe (79' Perbet)), Tshimanga, Schuermans, Kotysch, Duplus; Ngawa (59' Croizet), Maertens, Mercier; Henry, Sowah | Ravet; Hubert; Myny; Ouédraogo | (yellow card) 57' Ngawa; (yellow card) 61' Tshimanga |
| 14 March 2020; 20:30; King Power at Den Dreef Stadium; Leuven | 79' Perbet | 0–1; 0–2; 0–3; 1–3; 1–4 | 42' Schuermans (o.g.); 52' Tissoudali; 62' Noubissi 90+3' Placca | Keet; Aguemon (46' Limbombe (79' Perbet)), Tshimanga, Schuermans, Kotysch, Duplus; Ngawa (59' Croizet), Maertens, Mercier; Henry, Sowah | Ravet; Hubert; Myny; Ouédraogo | (yellow card) 57' Ngawa; (yellow card) 61' Tshimanga |

== Belgian Cup ==
=== Results ===
2019–20 Belgian Cup
| Match Details | Home team | Result | Away team | Lineup | Unused Subs | Bookings |
Round 5
| 23 August 2019; 20:30; King Power at Den Dreef Stadium; Leuven | Oud-Heverlee Leuven | 6–0 | Wetteren | Keet; Laes, Kotysch, Schuermans, Duplus; Keita (?' Hubert), Mercier, Van Hyfte; Maertens, Henry (?' Sowah), Aguemon (?' Allemeersch) | Thamsatchanan; Gilis; Mertens; Ngawa | (yellow card) Allemeersch; (yellow card) Duplus |
| 23 August 2019; 20:30; King Power at Den Dreef Stadium; Leuven | 2' Maertens; 20' Aguemon; 63' Henry; 79' Sowah; 86' Allemeersch; 90' Sowah | 1–0; 2–0; 3–0; 4–0; 5–0; 6–0 | | Keet; Laes, Kotysch, Schuermans, Duplus; Keita (?' Hubert), Mercier, Van Hyfte; Maertens, Henry (?' Sowah), Aguemon (?' Allemeersch) | Thamsatchanan; Gilis; Mertens; Ngawa | (yellow card) Allemeersch; (yellow card) Duplus |
Round 6
| 25 September 2019; 20:30; Stayen; Sint-Truiden | Sint-Truiden | 2–0 (a.e.t.) | Oud-Heverlee Leuven | Keet; Ngawa, Schuermans, Duplus; Hubert (41' Gillekens), Kehli (97' Sowah), Maertens, Van Hyfte; Aguemon, Mbombo (72' Tučić), Perbet (72' Henry) | Thamsatchanan; Mercier; Tshimanga | (yellow card) 85' Henry; (yellow card) 81' (yellow-red card) 117' Ngawa |
| 25 September 2019; 20:30; Stayen; Sint-Truiden | 98' Boli; 117' Botaka | 1–0; 2–0 | | Keet; Ngawa, Schuermans, Duplus; Hubert (41' Gillekens), Kehli (97' Sowah), Maertens, Van Hyfte; Aguemon, Mbombo (72' Tučić), Perbet (72' Henry) | Thamsatchanan; Mercier; Tshimanga | (yellow card) 85' Henry; (yellow card) 81' (yellow-red card) 117' Ngawa |

== Squad statistics ==
Includes only competitive matches.

=== Appearances ===
Players with no appearances not included in the list.

| No. | Pos. | Nat. | Name | First Division B | | | Belgian Cup | | | End of season play-offs | | | Total | | |
| No. | Pos. | Nat. | Name | Starts | Sub | Unused Sub | Starts | Sub | Unused Sub | Starts | Sub | Unused Sub | Starts | Sub | Unused Sub |
|---|---|---|---|---|---|---|---|---|---|---|---|---|---|---|---|
| 2 | DF | (Belgium) | Jan Van den Bergh | 5 | 0 | 1 | 0 | 0 | 0 | 1 | 0 | 0 | 6 | 0 | 1 |
| 3 | DF | (Belgium) | Derrick Tshimanga | 26 | 0 | 0 | 0 | 0 | 1 | 2 | 0 | 0 | 28 | 0 | 1 |
| 4 | DF | (Belgium) | Kenneth Schuermans | 28 | 0 | 0 | 2 | 0 | 0 | 2 | 0 | 0 | 32 | 0 | 0 |
| 5 | DF | (Belgium) | Pierre-Yves Ngawa | 19 | 2 | 3 | 1 | 0 | 1 | 2 | 0 | 0 | 22 | 2 | 4 |
| 6 | MF | (Belgium) | David Hubert | 5 | 2 | 5 | 1 | 1 | 0 | 0 | 1 | 1 | 6 | 4 | 6 |
| 7 | MF | (Benin) | Yannick Aguemon | 16 | 8 | 1 | 2 | 0 | 0 | 1 | 1 | 0 | 19 | 9 | 1 |
| 8 | MF | (Belgium) | Tom Van Hyfte | 22 | 4 | 3 | 2 | 0 | 0 | 0 | 0 | 1 | 24 | 4 | 4 |
| 9 | FW | (France) | Thomas Henry | 25 | 1 | 1 | 1 | 1 | 0 | 2 | 0 | 0 | 28 | 2 | 1 |
| 10 | MF | (France) | Xavier Mercier | 24 | 3 | 0 | 1 | 0 | 1 | 1 | 1 | 0 | 26 | 4 | 1 |
| 11 | FW | (Belgium) | Yanis Mbombo | 4 | 12 | 7 | 1 | 0 | 0 | 0 | 0 | 0 | 5 | 12 | 7 |
| 12 | FW | (Belgium) | Stallone Limbombe | 0 | 0 | 1 | 0 | 0 | 0 | 0 | 1 | 1 | 0 | 1 | 2 |
| 14 | MF | (Ghana) | Kamal Sowah | 19 | 7 | 0 | 0 | 2 | 0 | 2 | 0 | 0 | 21 | 9 | 0 |
| 15 | DF | (Burkina Faso) | Dylan Ouédraogo | 0 | 1 | 11 | 0 | 0 | 0 | 0 | 0 | 1 | 0 | 1 | 12 |
| 16 | GK | (South Africa) | Darren Keet | 6 | 0 | 18 | 2 | 0 | 0 | 1 | 0 | 1 | 9 | 0 | 19 |
| 17 | MF | (France) | Samy Kehli | 2 | 8 | 5 | 1 | 0 | 0 | 0 | 0 | 0 | 3 | 8 | 5 |
| 18 | FW | (Belgium) | Jo Gilis | 0 | 1 | 2 | 0 | 0 | 1 | 0 | 0 | 0 | 0 | 1 | 3 |
| 19 | DF | (France) | Frédéric Duplus | 27 | 0 | 1 | 2 | 0 | 0 | 2 | 0 | 0 | 31 | 0 | 1 |
| 20 | MF | (Belgium) | Isaac Asante | 0 | 0 | 1 | 0 | 0 | 0 | 0 | 0 | 0 | 0 | 0 | 1 |
| 22 | MF | (Belgium) | Olivier Myny | 3 | 5 | 5 | 0 | 0 | 0 | 0 | 0 | 1 | 3 | 5 | 6 |
| 23 | DF | (Germany) | Sascha Kotysch | 8 | 1 | 1 | 1 | 0 | 0 | 1 | 0 | 0 | 10 | 1 | 1 |
| 24 | MF | (Canada) | Tristan Borges | 1 | 3 | 1 | 0 | 0 | 0 | 0 | 0 | 0 | 1 | 3 | 1 |
| 26 | GK | (Belgium) | Laurent Henkinet | 23 | 1 | 5 | 0 | 0 | 0 | 1 | 0 | 0 | 24 | 1 | 5 |
| 27 | DF | (Belgium) | Jordy Gillekens | 2 | 3 | 12 | 0 | 1 | 0 | 0 | 0 | 0 | 2 | 4 | 12 |
| 28 | DF | (Belgium) | Toon Raemaekers | 1 | 0 | 4 | 0 | 0 | 0 | 0 | 0 | 0 | 1 | 0 | 4 |
| 29 | MF | (Belgium) | Amîr Lemti | 1 | 0 | 2 | 0 | 0 | 0 | 0 | 0 | 0 | 1 | 0 | 2 |
| 30 | FW | (Slovenia) | Milan Tučić | 2 | 1 | 3 | 0 | 1 | 0 | 0 | 0 | 0 | 2 | 2 | 3 |
| 31 | DF | (Belgium) | Brent Laes | 1 | 0 | 7 | 1 | 0 | 0 | 0 | 0 | 0 | 2 | 0 | 7 |
| 32 | FW | (Belgium) | Daan Vekemans | 0 | 0 | 1 | 0 | 0 | 0 | 0 | 0 | 0 | 0 | 0 | 1 |
| 33 | MF | (Belgium) | Mathieu Maertens | 27 | 0 | 0 | 2 | 0 | 0 | 2 | 0 | 0 | 31 | 0 | 0 |
| 36 | DF | (Senegal) | Thierno Gaye | 1 | 0 | 1 | 0 | 0 | 0 | 0 | 0 | 0 | 1 | 0 | 1 |
| 38 | GK | (Belgium) | Oregan Ravet | 0 | 0 | 2 | 0 | 0 | 0 | 0 | 0 | 1 | 0 | 0 | 3 |
| 39 | FW | (Belgium) | Arthur Allemeersch | 0 | 1 | 1 | 0 | 1 | 0 | 0 | 0 | 0 | 0 | 2 | 1 |
| 43 | FW | (France) | Jérémy Perbet | 4 | 15 | 6 | 1 | 0 | 0 | 1 | 1 | 0 | 6 | 16 | 6 |
| 77 | MF | (France) | Yohan Croizet | 0 | 1 | 1 | 0 | 0 | 0 | 0 | 1 | 1 | 0 | 2 | 2 |
| 99 | MF | (Ivory Coast) | Aboubakar Keita | 18 | 3 | 1 | 1 | 0 | 0 | 1 | 0 | 0 | 20 | 3 | 1 |
Players that have appeared this season, who are out on loan or have left OH Leuven
| 1 | GK | (Thailand) | Kawin Thamsatchanan (on loan to Hokkaido Consadole Sapporo) | 0 | 0 | 3 | 0 | 0 | 2 | 0 | 0 | 0 | 0 | 0 | 5 |
| 24 | MF | (Belgium) | Jarno Libert (transferred to RWDM47) | 0 | 0 | 2 | 0 | 0 | 0 | 0 | 0 | 0 | 0 | 0 | 2 |
| 25 | DF | (Belgium) | Jenthe Mertens (transferred to Go Ahead Eagles) | 0 | 0 | 0 | 0 | 0 | 1 | 0 | 0 | 0 | 0 | 0 | 1 |

=== Goalscorers ===
| Rank | Pos. | No. | Player | First Division B | Belgian Cup | End of season play-offs | Total |
|---|---|---|---|---|---|---|---|
| 1 | FW | 9 | (France) Thomas Henry | 15 | 1 | 0 | 16 |
| 2 | MF | 33 | (Belgium) Mathieu Maertens | 8 | 1 | 0 | 9 |
| 3 | FW | 43 | (France) Jérémy Perbet | 5 | 0 | 1 | 6 |
| 4 | MF | 14 | (Ghana) Kamal Sowah | 3 | 2 | 0 | 5 |
| 5 | MF | 8 | (Belgium) Tom Van Hyfte | 3 | 0 | 0 | 3 |
| 5 | MF | 10 | (France) Xavier Mercier | 3 | 0 | 0 | 3 |
| 7 | DF | 2 | (Belgium) Jan Van den Bergh | 2 | 0 | 0 | 2 |
| 7 | MF | 7 | (Benin) Yannick Aguemon | 1 | 1 | 0 | 2 |
| 7 | FW | 11 | (Belgium) Yanis Mbombo | 2 | 0 | 0 | 2 |
| 10 | DF | 3 | (Belgium) Derrick Tshimanga | 1 | 0 | 0 | 1 |
| 10 | DF | 4 | (Belgium) Kenneth Schuermans | 1 | 0 | 0 | 1 |
| 10 | DF | 23 | (Germany) Sascha Kotysch | 1 | 0 | 0 | 1 |
| 10 | FW | 39 | (Belgium) Arthur Allemeersch | 0 | 1 | 0 | 1 |
| Own Goals | | | | 0 | 0 | 0 | 0 |
| Total | | | | 45 | 6 | 1 | 52 |

=== Clean sheets ===
| No. | Player | First Division B | Belgian Cup | End of season play-offs | Total clean sheets | % Clean sheet games | Goals conceded | Avg minutes between conceding |
|---|---|---|---|---|---|---|---|---|
| 1 | (Thailand) Kawin Thamsatchanan | 0 | 0 | 0 | 0 | NA | 0 | NA |
| 16 | (South Africa) Darren Keet | 2 | 1 | 0 | 3 | 33.33 % | 13 | 62.31 |
| 26 | (Belgium) Laurent Henkinet | 8 | 0 | 0 | 8 | 32 % | 35 | 54.86 |
| 38 | (Belgium) Oregan Ravet | 0 | 0 | 0 | 0 | NA | 0 | NA |
