= 2021–22 Oud-Heverlee Leuven season =

Oud-Heverlee Leuven
2021–22 season
- Owner: King Power International Group
- Chairman: Aiyawatt Srivaddhanaprabha
- Manager: Marc Brys
- Stadium: Den Dreef
- Belgian First Division A: 11th
- Belgian Cup: Quarter-finals
- Top goalscorer: League: Sory Kaba (10); All: Sory Kaba (12)
Home colours	Away colours	Third colours

The 2021–22 season was the 20th season in the existence of Oud-Heverlee Leuven and its second consecutive season in the top flight of Belgian football. In addition to the domestic league, Oud-Heverlee Leuven participated in this season's edition of the Belgian Cup.

== Players ==
- This section lists players who were in Oud-Heveree Leuven's first team squad at any point during the 2021–22 season and appeared at least once on the match sheet (possibly as unused substitute)
- The symbol ℒ indicates a player who is on loan from another club
- The symbol ¥ indicates a youngster

No.	Nationality	Name	Position	Joined First Team	Previous club	Left First Team
Goalkeepers
13	(Iceland)	Rúnar Alex Rúnarsson^{ℒ}	GK	31 August 2021	(England) Arsenal	(30 June 2022)
38	(Belgium)	Oregan Ravet^{¥}	GK	Summer 2019	Youth Squad	–
90	(Venezuela) / (Spain)	Rafael Romo	GK	19 August 2020	(Denmark) Silkeborg	–
Defenders
3	(Morocco)	Sofian Chakla	CB	27 August 2021	(Spain) Villarreal	–
5	(Belgium) / (Democratic Republic of the Congo)	Pierre-Yves Ngawa	RB	11 August 2019	(Italy) Perugia	–
6	(Belgium)	Sébastien Dewaest^{ℒ}	CB	20 July 2021	(Belgium) Genk	(30 June 2022)
15	(Burkina Faso) / (France)	Dylan Ouédraogo	CB	28 August 2019	(Cyprus) Apollon Limassol	–
18	(Hungary)	Barnabás Bese	RB	20 August 2020	(France) Le Havre	3 January 2022
24	(Belgium)	Casper de Norre	LB/RB	5 October 2020	(Belgium) Genk	–
25	(Belgium)	Louis Patris^{¥}	CB	Summer 2019	Youth Squad	–
28	(Belgium)	Toon Raemaekers^{¥}	CB	Summer 2019	Youth Squad	–
29	(France)	Scotty Sadzoute	LB	7 July 2021	(France) Lille	31 January 2022
35	(Turkey)	Cenk Özkacar^{ℒ}	LB	6 July 2021	(France) Lyon	(30 June 2022)
46	(Belgium)	Milan Taildeman^{¥}	LB	Summer 2021	Youth Squad	–
Midfielders
4	(Bulgaria)	Kristiyan Malinov	DM / CM	20 August 2020	(Bulgaria) CSKA Sofia	–
10	(France)	Xavier Mercier	CM	16 June 2019	(Belgium) Cercle Brugge	–
11	(Jordan)	Musa Al-Taamari	RW	5 October 2020	(Cyprus) APOEL	–
14	(Belgium)	Thibault Vlietinck^{ℒ}	RW	12 August 2020	(Belgium) Club Brugge	(30 June 2022)
20	(Belgium) / (Ghana)	Isaac Asante^{¥}	AM	Winter 2019–20	Youth Squad	–
21	(Belgium)	Alexis De Sart^{ℒ}	CM	22 August 2021	(Belgium) Antwerp	(30 June 2022)
27	(Belgium)	Mandela Keita^{¥}	CM	Winter 2020–21	Youth Squad	–
33	(Belgium)	Mathieu Maertens	CM / AM	12 July 2017	(Belgium) Cercle Brugge	–
42	(Belgium)	Jo Gilis^{¥}	AM	Summer 2018	Youth Squad	–
Forwards
7	(Benin) / (France)	Yannick Aguemon	CF / LW / RW	28 June 2017	(Belgium) Union SG	–
8	(Belgium)	Siebe Schrijvers	CF / AM / RW	15 January 2021	(Belgium) Club Brugge	–
9	(France)	Thomas Henry	CF	17 January 2019	(Belgium) Tubize	24 August 2021
9	(Guinea)	Sory Kaba^{ℒ}	CF	31 August 2021	(Denmark) Midtjylland	(30 June 2022)
17	(Ukraine)	Mykola Kukharevych^{ℒ}	CF	1 September 2021	(France) Troyes	(30 June 2022)
19	(Georgia (country))	Levan Shengelia	RW	11 August 2021	(Turkey) Konyaspor	–
32	(Belgium)	Daan Vekemans^{¥}	CF	Summer 2018	Youth Squad	–
39	(Belgium)	Arthur Allemeersch^{¥}	CF	Summer 2019	Youth Squad	–
77	(Nigeria)	Jesse Sekidika^{ℒ}	RW	27 August 2021	(Turkey) Galatasaray	31 January 2022
99	(Iran)	Kaveh Rezaei	CF	4 January 2021	(Belgium) Club Brugge	–

=== Did not appear on match sheet ===
The following players were listed as part of Oud-Heveree Leuven's first team squad during the 2021–22 season, but never appeared on the match sheet

No.	Nationality	Name	Position	Joined First Team	Previous club	Left First Team	Note
1	(Thailand)	Kawin Thamsatchanan	GK	10 January 2018	(Thailand) Muangthong United	4 January 2022	Not on match sheet in first half of season, then loaned to (Thailand) Port until 30 June 2022
20	(Ivory Coast)	Cedrik Gbo	DM	11 March 2022	(Tunisia) ES Tunis	(30 June 2022)	
24	(Canada)	Tristan Borges	CM / LW / RW	22 January 2020	(Canada) Forge FC	–	Was on loan to (Canada) Forge FC until 30 November 2021, then placed at reserves. Again loaned out to Forge FC from 31 January 2022 until the end of the season.

== Pre-season and friendlies ==
Win Draw Loss

15 June 2021 Friendly	OH Leuven (Belgium)	7–1	(Belgium) OHR Huldenberg	Oud-Heverlee, Belgium
	Ngawa; Henry; Mercier; Aguemon; Allemeersch; Maertens	Report	Wouters

19 June 2021 Friendly	OH Leuven (Belgium)	5–1	(Belgium) Olympia Wijgmaal	Oud-Heverlee, Belgium
	Nsingi; Allemeersch; Henry	Report	Robin

23 June 2021 Friendly	OH Leuven (Belgium)	4–1	(Belgium) Rupel Boom	Oud-Heverlee, Belgium
	Schrijvers; Allemeersch; Vekemans	Report	Abaz

29 June 2021 Friendly	OH Leuven (Belgium)	3–2	(Israel) Maccabi Haifa	Mierlo, Netherlands
	Maertens 20'; Vekemans 68'; Henry 86'	Report	Haziza 60'; Ifrach 87'	Stadium: Sportpark De Ark

2 July 2021 Friendly	OH Leuven (Belgium)	1–3	(Belgium) Waasland-Beveren	Sint-Michielsgestel, Netherlands
	Aguemon (pen.)	Report	Montes; Albanese; Verreth	Stadium: Sportpark Zegenwerp

10 July 2021 Friendly	OH Leuven (Belgium)	1–0	(France) Valenciennes	Belgium
	Vekemans	Report

14 July 2021 Friendly	OH Leuven (Belgium)	Cancelled	(Netherlands) Fortuna Sittard	Belgium

17 July 2021 Friendly	Fortuna Düsseldorf (Germany)	3–0	(Belgium) OH Leuven	Düsseldorf, Germany
	Patris (o.g.); Hennings (pen.); Zimmermann	Report		Stadium: Merkur Spiel-Arena

10 August 2021 Friendly	OH Leuven (Belgium)	5–2	(Belgium) Visé	Oud-Heverlee, Belgium
	Allemeersch; Vekemans; Al-Taamari; Vlietinck; Taildeman	Report	Thuys

16 August 2021 Friendly	OH Leuven (Belgium)	2–1	(Belgium) Mechelen	Oud-Heverlee, Belgium
	Shengelia; Rezaei	Report	Van Damme

11 November 2021 Friendly	OH Leuven (Belgium)	0–2	(Belgium) Genk	Oud-Heverlee, Belgium
12:00 CET (UTC+1)		Report		Stadium: Gemeentelijk Stadion

8 January 2022 Friendly	1. FC Heidenheim (Germany)	3–1	(Belgium) OH Leuven	Algorfa, Spain
15:00 CET (UTC+1)		Report		Stadium: La Finca Golf & Spa Resort

== Competitions ==
=== Overall record ===
Competition	First match	Last match	Starting round	Final position	Record							
Competition	First match	Last match	Starting round	Final position	Pld	W	D	L	GF	GA	GD	Win %
First Division A	25 July 2021	10 April 2022	Matchday 1	11th	34	10	11	13	47	58	−11	29.41
Belgian Cup	27 October 2021	23 December 2021	Sixth round	Quarter-finals	3	2	0	1	6	7	−1	66.67
Total					37	12	11	14	53	65	−12	32.43

Source: Soccerway

=== First Division A ===
==== League table ====
Pos	Team	Pld	W	D	L	GF	GA	GD	Pts
9	Sint-Truiden	34	15	6	13	42	40	+2	51
10	Cercle Brugge	34	12	9	13	49	46	+3	45
11	OH Leuven	34	10	11	13	47	58	−11	41
12	Oostende	34	10	7	17	34	61	−27	37
13	Kortrijk	34	9	10	15	43	48	−5	37

Source: Jupiler Pro League (in Dutch), Soccerway
Rules for classification: 1) Points; 2) Matches won; 3) Goal difference; 4) Goals scored; 5) Away matches won; 6) Away goal difference; 7) Away goals scored; 8) Play-off.

==== Results summary ====
Overall								Home						Away					
Pld	W	D	L	GF	GA	GD	Pts	W	D	L	GF	GA	GD	W	D	L	GF	GA	GD
34	10	11	13	47	58	−11	41	7	4	6	25	25	0	3	7	7	22	33	−11

Source: Jupiler Pro League

==== Results by round ====
Round	1	2	3	4	5	6	7	8	9	10	11	12	13	14	15	16	17	18	19	20	21	22	23	24	25	26	27	28	29	30	31	32	33	34
Ground	H	A	H	A	H	A	H	A	A	H	A	H	A	H	H	A	H	A	H	H	A	H	A	A	H	A	H	A	H	A	H	A	H	A
Result	D	D	D	L	L	D	W	L	D	D	D	W	D	W	L	W	L	L	L	W	W	W	L	D	W	W	W	L	D	L	L	D	L	L
Position	11	12	16	17	17	17	17	17	17	16	16	15	14	14	14	13	14	14	15	13	10	11	13	13	14	11	9	12	12	12	11	11	11	11

Source: Jupiler Pro League
A = Away; H = Home; W = Win; D = Draw; L = Loss

==== Matches ====
The league fixtures were announced on 8 June 2021.

24 July 2021 1	OH Leuven	1–1	Zulte Waregem	Leuven
16:00 CEST (UTC+2)	Henry 42' (pen.)	Report	Vossen 24'; Van Aken (yellow card) 48' (yellow-red card) 62'	Stadium: Den Dreef; Attendance: 3,300; Referee: Bert Put

31 July 2021 2	Cercle Brugge	1–1	OH Leuven	Brugge
18:30 CEST (UTC+2)	Rubio 73'	Report	Henry 30'	Stadium: Jan Breydel Stadium; Attendance: 2,500; Referee: Lothar D'hondt

8 August 2021 3	OH Leuven	1–1	Charleroi	Leuven
16:00 CEST (UTC+2)		Report		Stadium: Den Dreef; Attendance: 3,300; Referee: Nathan Verboomen

14 August 2021 4	Genk	4–0	OH Leuven	Genk
20:45 CEST (UTC+2)	Bongonda 3'; Lucumí (yellow card) 49'; Onuachu 59'; Ito 77'; Thorstvedt 90+2'	Report	Özkacar (yellow card) 16'; Schrijvers (yellow card) 53'; Keita (yellow card) 63'; Dewaest (yellow card) 70'; Henry (yellow card) 71'	Stadium: Luminus Arena; Attendance: 10,147; Referee: Kevin Van Damme

21 August 2021 5	OH Leuven	1–4	Eupen	Leuven
18:30 CEST (UTC+2)		Report		Stadium: Den Dreef; Attendance: 5,000; Referee: Wim Smet

29 August 2021 6	Antwerp	2–2	OH Leuven	Antwerp
16:00 CEST (UTC+2)	Maertens 38' (o.g.); Frey 45+2' (pen.); Vines (yellow card) 54'; Balikwisha (yellow card) 67'; Buta (yellow card) 71'; B. Verstraete (yellow card) 90+3'	Report	Maertens (yellow card) 48'; Özkacar 55'; Ngawa (yellow card) 67'; Shengelia 76'; Schrijvers (yellow card) 83'; Dewaest (yellow card) 90+2' (yellow-red card) 90+2'	Stadium: Bosuilstadion; Attendance: 10,223; Referee: Wesli De Cremer

12 September 2021 7	OH Leuven	2–1	Kortrijk	Leuven
21:00 CEST (UTC+2)	De Sart 50'; Schrijvers 78'	Report	Selemani 62'; Radovanović (red card) 90+2'	Stadium: Den Dreef; Attendance: 3,200; Referee: Wim Smet

18 September 2021 8	Mechelen	2–0	OH Leuven	Mechelen
CEST (UTC+2)		Report		Stadium: Achter de Kazerne; Attendance: 13,547; Referee: Lawrence Visser

24 September 2021 9	Club Brugge	1–1	OH Leuven	Bruges
CEST (UTC+2)		Report		Stadium: Jan Breydel Stadium; Attendance: 26,000; Referee: Jasper Vergoote

2 October 2021 10	OH Leuven	0–0	Beerschot	Leuven
16:00 CEST (UTC+2)		Report		Stadium: Den Dreef; Attendance: 5,200; Referee: Erik Lambrechts

16 October 2021 11	Standard Liège	2–2	OH Leuven	Liège
18:30 CEST (UTC+2)		Report		Stadium: Stade Maurice Dufrasne; Attendance: 18,645; Referee: Kevin Van Damme

24 October 2021 12	OH Leuven	4–1	Sint-Truiden	Leuven
20:45 CEST (UTC+2)		Report		Stadium: Den Dreef; Attendance: 5,100; Referee: Nicolas Laforge

31 October 2021 13	Anderlecht	2–2	OH Leuven	Anderlecht
CET (UTC+1)		Report		Stadium: Constant Vanden Stock Stadium; Attendance: 19,000; Referee: Jasper Vergoote

5 November 2021 14	OH Leuven	1–0	Oostende	Leuven
20:45 CET (UTC+1)		Report		Stadium: Den Dreef; Attendance: 5,540; Referee: Wesli De Cremer

20 November 2021 15	OH Leuven	1–3	Seraing	Leuven
16:00 CET (UTC+1)	Maertens 73'	Report	Mikautadze 20'; Maziz 71'; Kilota 86'	Stadium: Den Dreef; Attendance: 4,767; Referee: Nicolas Laforge

26 November 2021 16	Union Saint-Gilloise	1–3	OH Leuven	Brussels
20:45 CET (UTC+1)	Vanzeir (yellow card) 34'; Mitoma 51'; Nieuwkoop (yellow card) 77'; Sorinola (yellow card) 79'	Report	de Norre 13'; Maertens 40'; Malinov (yellow card) 53'; Mercier (yellow card) 58', (goal) 67'; Özkaçar (yellow card) 62'	Stadium: Stade Joseph Marien; Attendance: 8,100; Referee: Nathan Verboomen

4 December 2021 17	OH Leuven	0–1	Gent	Leuven
16:15 CET (UTC+1)		Report	Tissoudali 10'	Stadium: Den Dreef; Attendance: 4,047; Referee: Jan Boterberg

11 December 2021 18	Kortrijk	2–1	OH Leuven	Kortrijk
16:30 CET (UTC+1)		Report		Stadium: Guldensporen Stadion; Attendance: 4,321; Referee: Jasper Vergoote

15 December 2021 19	OH Leuven	1–4	Club Brugge	Leuven
21:00 CET (UTC+1)		Report		Stadium: Den Dreef; Attendance: 8,643; Referee: Lawrence Visser

19 December 2021 20	OH Leuven	2–1	Standard Liège	Leuven
20:45 CET (UTC+1)		Report		Stadium: Den Dreef; Attendance: 4,820; Referee: Alexandre Boucaut

27 December 2021 21	Charleroi	0–3	OH Leuven	Charleroi
18:45 CET (UTC+1)		Report		Stadium: Stade du Pays de Charleroi; Attendance: 0 Referee: Kevin Van Damme

15 January 2022 22	OH Leuven	5–0	Mechelen	Leuven
16:15 CET (UTC+1)				Stadium: Den Dreef
Note: The result was awarded as 5–0 forfeit win due to Mechelen opting to not send their team after multiple COVID-19 cases. Their initial request to postpone the match was declined.

22 January 2022 23	Beerschot	3–1	OH Leuven	Antwerp
16:00 CET (UTC+1)		Report		Stadium: Olympisch Stadion; Attendance: 0 Referee: Kevin Van Damme

26 January 2022 24	Zulte Waregem	1–1	OH Leuven	Waregem
16:00 CET (UTC+1)	Vossen 40'	Report	Kaba 29'	Stadium: Regenboogstadion; Attendance: 0 Referee: Nicolas Laforge

5 February 2022 26	Oostende	1–3	OH Leuven	Ostend
21:00 CET (UTC+1)	D'Arpino 56'	Report	Shengelia 34'; Kaba 48'; Al-Taamari 85'	Stadium: Diaz Arena; Attendance: 2,221; Referee: Wim Smet

9 February 2022 25	OH Leuven	2–1	Genk	Leuven
21:00 CET (UTC+1)	Kaba 1', 90+3' (pen.)	Report	Sadick 19'; Heynen (red card) 14'	Stadium: Den Dreef; Attendance: 4,042; Referee: Bert Put

12 February 2022 27	OH Leuven	3–2	Cercle Brugge	Leuven
18:30 CET (UTC+1)	Maertens 40'; Kaba 63'; Al-Taamari 67'	Report	Matondo 32'; Denkey 43'	Stadium: Den Dreef; Attendance: 3,898; Referee: Alexandre Boucaut

20 February 2022 28	Sint-Truiden	2–0	OH Leuven	Sint-Truiden
20:45 CET (UTC+1)		Report		Stadium: Stayen; Attendance: 2,471; Referee: Jasper Vergoote

26 February 2022 29	OH Leuven	0–0	Anderlecht	Leuven
20:45 CET (UTC+1)		Report		Stadium: Den Dreef; Attendance: 7,801; Referee: Erik Lambrechts

6 March 2022 30	Eupen	3–1	OH Leuven	Eupen
16:00 CET (UTC+1)		Report		Stadium: Kehrwegstadion; Attendance: 1,200; Referee: Kevin Van Damme

11 March 2022 31	OH Leuven	1–4	Union Saint-Gilloise	Leuven
20:45 CET (UTC+1)	Schrijvers 11' (pen.)	Report	Undav 27', 48', 62' (pen.); Teuma 58'	Stadium: King Power at Den Dreef; Attendance: 7,123; Referee: Jonathan Lardot

19 March 2022 32	Seraing	1–1	OH Leuven	Seraing
16:00 CET (UTC+1)	Maziz 86'	Report	De Sart 47'	Stadium: Stade du Pairay; Attendance: 2,000; Referee: Bert Put

2 April 2022 33	OH Leuven	0–1	Antwerp	Leuven
20:45 CEST (UTC+2)	Dewaest (yellow card) 65'	Report	B. Verstraete (yellow card) 8'; Seck (yellow card) 14', (goal) 40'; Buta (yellow card) 30'	Stadium: Den Dreef; Attendance: 6,491; Referee: Jonathan Lardot

10 April 2022 34	Gent	5–0	OH Leuven	Ghent
18:30 CEST (UTC+2)	De Sart 42'; Tissoudali 48', 89', 90'; Hjulsager 86'	Report		Stadium: Ghelamco Arena; Attendance: 19,524; Referee: Jasper Vergoote

=== Belgian Cup ===
27 October 2021 Sixth round	Lierse Kempenzonen	1–2	OH Leuven	Lier
20:45 CEST (UTC+2)	Liongola 80'	Report	Kaba 62' (pen.), 86'	Stadium: Herman Vanderpoortenstadion; Referee: Kevin Debeuckelaere

1 December 2021 Seventh round	Westerlo	2–3	OH Leuven	Westerlo
18:45 CET (UTC+1)	Remmer 12'; Bernát 67'	Report	De Norre 55'; Schrijvers 89'; Maertens 90+3'	Stadium: Het Kuipje; Referee: Will Smet

23 December 2021 Quarter-finals	Club Brugge	4–1	OH Leuven	Bruges
21:00 CET (UTC+1)	De Ketelaere 41'; Balanta 45+6'; Lang 65'; Vanaken 90+2'	Report	Mercier 59'	Stadium: Jan Breydel Stadium; Referee: Bram van Driessche
