= Eneco Stadion =

Eneco Stadion may refer to the following football stadia:

- Sparta Stadion Het Kasteel, in Rotterdam, Netherlands
- Den Dreef, in Leuven, Belgium
