= Sory Kaba =

Guinean footballer (born 1995)

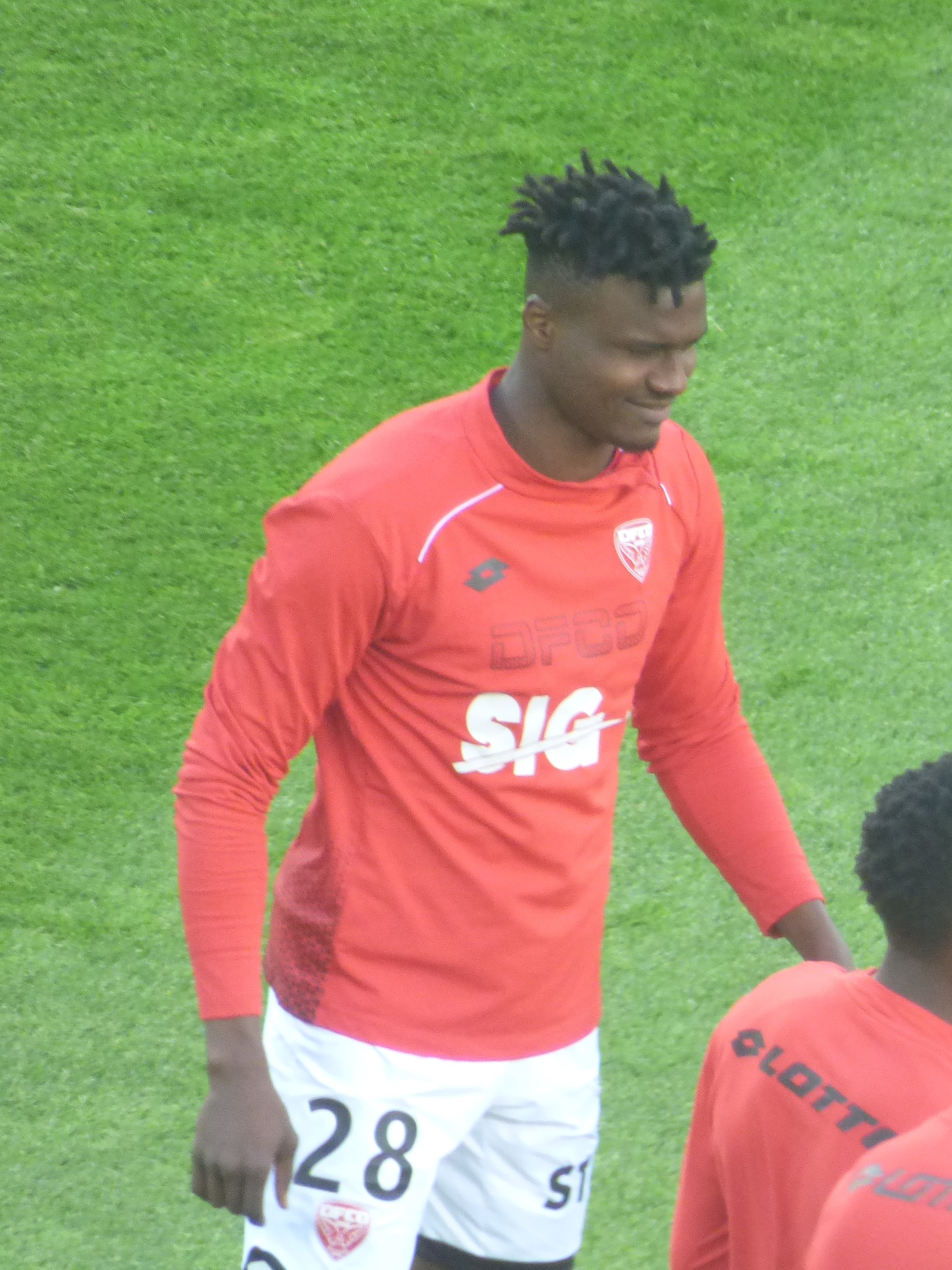
- Kaba with Dijon in 2019

Personal information
- Date of birth: 28 July 1995 (age 31)
- Place of birth: Conakry, Guinea
- Height: 1.91 m (6 ft 3 in)
- Position: Forward

Team information
- Current team: Al-Dhafra

Youth career
- 2012–2014: Alcobendas

Senior career*
Years	Team	Apps	(Gls)
2014–2016	Alcobendas	52	(13)
2016–2017	Elche B	32	(14)
2017–2019	Elche	59	(22)
2019	Dijon	9	(0)
2019–2023	Midtjylland	73	(20)
2021–2022	→ OH Leuven (loan)	26	(10)
2023	→ Cardiff City (loan)	17	(8)
2023–2025	Las Palmas	17	(1)
2024–2025	→ Elche (loan)	24	(4)
2025–2026	OH Leuven	30	(6)
2026–	Al-Dhafra	0	(0)

International career^{‡}
2017–	Guinea	21	(3)
- * Club domestic league appearances and goals as of 1 June 2026 ‡ National team caps and goals as of 23:25, 10 October 2020 (UTC)

Sory Kaba (born 28 July 1995) is a Guinean professional footballer who plays as a forward for Al-Dhafra, and the Guinea national team.

== Club career ==
Born in Conakry, Kaba moved to Spain at early age and joined Alcobendas' youth setup in September 2012. He made his senior debut during the 2013–14 season, helping in their promotion to Tercera División.

On 29 January 2016, Kaba joined Elche, being assigned to the reserves also in the fourth tier. On 13 May of the following year he made his first team debut, coming on as a second-half substitute for Álex Fernández in a 1–0 Segunda División home loss against Mirandés.

Kaba scored his first professional goal on 28 May 2017, netting the equalizer in a 1–1 home draw against Reus. On 29 July, after suffering relegation, he extended his contract for three years and was definitely promoted to the first team.

On 31 January 2019, the last day of the 2018–19 winter transfer window, Kaba signed with Ligue 1 side Dijon having agreed a 4 1/2-year contract. The club paid a €4 million transfer fee to Elche triggering a release clause.

On 5 July 2019, Danish Superliga club Midtjylland announced that they had signed Kaba on a five-year contract. On 31 August 2021, Kaba moved to Belgian First Division A club OH Leuven on loan for the 2021–22 season. OH Leuven secured an option to sign him permanently. On 1 June it was confirmed that Kaba was returning to Midtjylland, as the Belgian club had decided not to exercise the option to buy the striker.

On 31 January 2023, the last day of the winter transfer window, Kaba joined EFL Championship club Cardiff City on loan until the end of the season.

On 17 August 2023, Kaba officially joined La Liga club Las Palmas for a reported fee of over €2 million, signing a four-year contract with the club. On 30 August of the following year, he returned to former side Elche on a one-year loan deal.

== International career ==
Kaba was first called up for the Guinea national team on 25 September 2017, for a 2018 FIFA World Cup qualifiers against Tunisia. He made his full international debut on 7 October, replacing Demba Camara in the 4–1 loss.

In January 2022, he was selected by selection Kaba Diawara to participate in the 2021 Africa Cup of Nations in Cameroon.

== Career statistics ==
=== Club ===
As of match played 22 September 2024

Appearances and goals by club, season and competition
Club	Season	League			National cup (Note: Includes Coupe de France, Danish Cup, Belgian Cup, Copa del Rey)		Europe		Other		Total	
Club	Season	Division	Apps	Goals	Apps	Goals	Apps	Goals	Apps	Goals	Apps	Goals
Elche	2016–17	Segunda División	5	1	–		–		–		5	1
Elche	2017–18	Tercera División	34	13	5	2	–		–		39	15
Elche	2018–19	Segunda División	20	8	0	0	–		–		20	8
Elche	Total		59	22	5	2	–		–		64	24
Dijon	2019–20	Ligue 1	9	0	1	0	–		1 (Note: Appearance in Ligue 1 relegation play-offs)	0	11	0
Midtjylland	2019–20	Danish Superliga	30	7	0	0	2 (Note: Appearances in UEFA Europa League)	1	–		32	8
Midtjylland	2020–21	Danish Superliga	27	11	5	2	10 (Note: Appearances in UEFA Champions League)	1	–		42	14
Midtjylland	2021–22	Danish Superliga	0	0	0	0	0	0	–		0	0
Midtjylland	2022–23	Danish Superliga	16	2	2	1	9 (Note: Four appearances in UEFA Champions League, five appearances and one goal in UEFA Europa League)	1	–		27	4
Midtjylland	2023–24	Danish Superliga	4	0	0	0	4 (Note: Appearances in UEFA Conference League)	1	–		8	1
Midtjylland	Total		77	20	7	3	25	4	–		109	27
OH Leuven (loan)	2021–22	Belgian Pro League	26	10	3	2	–		–		29	12
Cardiff City (loan)	2022–23	Championship	17	8	–		–		–		17	8
Las Palmas	2023–24	La Liga	17	1	3	1	–		–		20	2
Elche (loan)	2024–25	Segunda División	3	0	0	0	–		–		3	0
Career total			208	61	19	8	25	4	1	0	253	73

=== International ===
As of matches played on 10 October 2020

Appearances and goals by national team and year
National team	Year	Apps	Goals
Guinea	2017	1	0
Guinea	2018	3	0
Guinea	2019	9	2
Guinea	2020	1	1
Total		14	3

Scores and results list Guinea's goal tally first, score column indicates score after each Kaba goal.

List of international goals scored by Sory Kaba
No.	Date	Venue	Opponent	Score	Result	Competition
1	15 June 2019	Borg El Arab Stadium, Alexandria, Egypt	Egypt	1–1	1–3	Friendly
2	22 June 2019	Alexandria Stadium, Alexandria, Egypt	Madagascar	1–0	2–2	2019 Africa Cup of Nations
3	10 October 2020	Estádio Municipal de Albufeira, Albufeira, Portugal	Cape Verde	1–1	2–1	Friendly

== Honours ==
FC Midtjylland

- Danish Superliga: 2019–20
