= Thomas Henry (footballer) =

French footballer (born 1994)

Personal information
- Full name: Thomas Michel David Henry
- Date of birth: 20 September 1994 (age 32)
- Place of birth: Argenteuil, France
- Height: 1.92 m (6 ft 4 in)
- Position: Striker

Team information
- Current team: Reggiana
- Number: 9

Youth career
- –2002: AS Fontenay-aux-Roses
- –2012: CFFP Paris
- 2012–2013: Beauvais

Senior career*
Years	Team	Apps	(Gls)
2012–2013	Beauvais B	10	(1)
2013–2014	Beauvais	26	(4)
2014–2015	Fréjus Saint-Raphaël	21	(2)
2015–2016	Nantes B	17	(1)
2015–2016	Nantes	2	(0)
2016–2018	Chambly	47	(8)
2018–2019	Tubize	16	(11)
2019–2021	OH Leuven	75	(44)
2021–2022	Venezia	33	(9)
2022–2025	Hellas Verona	34	(5)
2024–2025	→ Palermo (loan)	24	(2)
2025–2026	Standard Liège	21	(3)
2026–	Reggiana	0	(0)
- * Club domestic league appearances and goals as of 27 September 2026

Thomas Michel David Henry (born 20 September 1994) is a French professional footballer who plays as a striker for Serie C Group B club Reggiana.

== Club career ==
=== Early career ===
Henry began his career at Beauvais and Fréjus Saint-Raphaël before joining Nantes in 2015. He made his Ligue 1 debut on 12 December 2015 against Toulouse FC in a 1–1 draw replacing Alejandro Bedoya after 72 minutes.

Having made two appearances in Ligue 1 for Nantes he signed for Chambly on 15 June 2016.

=== OH Leuven ===
Henry joined OH Leuven in January 2019 after impressing with Tubize in the Belgian second division, scoring 11 goals in the first half of the 2018–19 season. He continued his good form with OH Leuven and scored a career-high 21 goals in the 2020–21 Belgian Pro League, second-most in the league. Following his good form throughout the 2020–21 season, Henry was linked with a number of clubs in Europe's top leagues including Celtic, Bordeaux, and Venezia. In total, Henry scored 45 goals and added 12 assists in 79 matches across all competitions with OH Leuven over three-and-a-half seasons before his transfer in August 2021.

=== Venezia ===
On 24 August 2021, newly promoted Serie A side Venezia announced that Henry had joined the club in a permanent deal. The move came after intense transfer speculation throughout the summer, including earlier reports stating that OH Leuven had accepted a bid of £7 million by Scottish Premiership club Celtic. He made his debut for the club three days later in a 3–0 defeat to Udinese. He scored his first goal for the club in their next match, a 2–1 league win over Empoli on 11 September.

=== Hellas Verona ===
On 16 July 2022, Henry moved to Hellas Verona on a four-year contract.

=== Palermo ===
On 16 July 2024, Serie B club Palermo announced the signing of Henry from Verona on loan with an obligation to buy under certain conditions.

=== Standard Liège ===
On 3 July 2025, Henry returned to Belgium and signed a two-year contract with Standard Liège.

== Career statistics ==
As of match played 12 May 2024

Appearances and goals by club, season and competition
Club	Season	League			National cup		League cup		Total	
Club	Season	Division	Apps	Goals	Apps	Goals	Apps	Goals	Apps	Goals
Beauvais B	2012–13	Championnat de France Amateur 2	10	1	–		–		10	1
Beauvais	2012–13	Championnat de France Amateur	3	0	0	0	–		3	0
Beauvais	2013–14	Championnat de France Amateur	23	4	2	0	–		25	4
Beauvais	Total		26	4	2	0	–		28	4
Fréjus Saint-Raphaël	2014–15	Championnat National	21	2	0	0	0	0	21	2
Nantes B	2015–16	Championnat de France Amateur	17	1	–		–		17	1
Nantes	2015–16	Ligue 1	2	0	0	0	0	0	2	0
Chambly	2016–17	Championnat National	25	4	1	0	0	0	26	4
Chambly	2017–18	Championnat National	22	4	6	1	0	0	28	5
Chambly	Total		47	8	7	1	0	0	54	9
Tubize	2018–19	Belgian First Division B	16	11	1	0	–		17	11
OH Leuven	2018–19	Belgian First Division B	13	5	–		–		13	5
OH Leuven	2019–20	Belgian First Division B	27	15	2	1	–		29	16
OH Leuven	2020–21	Belgian First Division A	31	21	2	0	–		33	21
OH Leuven	2021–22	Belgian First Division A	4	3	0	0	–		4	3
OH Leuven	Total		75	44	4	1	–		79	45
Venezia	2021–22	Serie A	33	9	1	0	–		34	9
Hellas Verona	2022–23	Serie A	16	2	1	0	–		17	2
Hellas Verona	2023–24	Serie A	18	3	1	0	–		19	3
Hellas Verona	Total		34	5	2	0	–		36	5
Career total			281	85	17	2	0	0	298	87
