= List of Belgian football transfers winter 2022–23 =

This is a list of Belgian football transfers for the 2023 winter transfer window. Only transfers involving a team from the professional divisions are listed, including the 18 teams in the Belgian First Division A and the 12 teams playing in the Belgian First Division B.

The wintertransfer window opened on 1 January 2023 and towards the end of January 2023.

Note that several transfers were announced prior to the opening date. Furthermore, players without a club may join one at any time, either during or in between transfer windows. After the transfer window closes a few completed transfers might still be announced a few days later.

== Transfers ==
Date	Name	Moving from	Moving to	Fee
31 December 2022	(Ukraine) Oleksandr Filippov	(Latvia) Riga	Sint-Truiden	End of loan
31 December 2022	Radja Nainggolan	Antwerp	Free Agent	Free
1 January 2023	(Nigeria) Yira Sor	(Czech Republic) SK Slavia Prague	KRC Genk	Undisclosed
1 January 2023	Sada Diallo	RWDM47	Francs Borains	Loan
1 January 2023	Ilombe Mboyo	URSL Visé	RE Virton	Undisclosed
1 January 2023	(Bosnia and Herzegovina) Numan Kurdić	RWDM47	(Serbia) FK Novi Pazar	Loan
1 January 2023	(Portugal) João Gamboa	OH Leuven	(Portugal) G.D. Estoril Praia	Loan
1 January 2023	Chris Lokesa	RSC Anderlecht	(Netherlands) RKC Waalwijk	Undisclosed
1 January 2023	(Finland) Casper Terho	(Finland) HJK Helsinki	Royale Union Saint-Gilloise	Undisclosed
1 January 2023	(Croatia) Jakov Filipović	(Belarus) BATE Borisov	SK Beveren	Undisclosed
1 January 2023	(Singapore) Ilhan Fandi	Albirex Niigata Singapore FC	KMSK Deinze	Undisclosed
2 January 2023	(Bolivia) Ramiro Vaca	K Beerschot VA	(Bolivia) Club Bolívar	Undisclosed
2 January 2023	Arne Engels	Club Brugge	(Germany) FC Augsburg	Undisclosed
2 January 2023	(Croatia) Matej Rodin	(Poland) MKS Cracovia	KV Oostende	Undisclosed
2 January 2023	Pierre Dwomoh	R Antwerp FC	KV Oostende	Loan
3 January 2023	(Netherlands) Ruud Vormer	Club Brugge	SV Zulte Waregem	Loan
3 January 2023	(Serbia) Đorđe Gordić	(Serbia) FK Mladost Lučani	Lommel SK	Undisclosed
3 January 2023	(Slovakia) Martin Regáli	(Slovakia) MFK Ružomberok	KV Kortrijk	Undisclosed
3 January 2023	(Germany) Christalino Atemona	(Germany) Hertha BSC	KV Kortrijk	Undisclosed
3 January 2023	Theo Cenci	Free agent	KMSK Deinze	Free
4 January 2023	(Ecuador) Alfred Caicedo	(Ecuador) S.D. Aucas	KRC Genk	Undisclosed
4 January 2023	(Jamaica) Tarick Ximines	(Jamaica) Mount Pleasant Football Academy	Cercle Brugge	Undisclosed
4 January 2023	(France) Pierre Bourdin	Free agent	RE Virton	Free
4 January 2023	Jarno Jourquin	FCV Dender EH	KSV Oudenaarde	Loan
5 January 2023	Christian Brüls	Sint-Truidense V.V.	SV Zulte Waregem	Undisclosed
5 January 2023	(France) Simon Elisor	R.F.C. Seraing (1922)	(France) Stade Lavallois	Loan
5 January 2023	(France) Victor Routier	Standard Liège	Francs Borains	Loan
5 January 2023	(Brazil) Heitor	Cercle Brugge	(Brazil) Internacional	End of loan
6 January 2023	(Argentina) Santiago Ramos Mingo	OH Leuven	(Argentina) Defensa y Justicia	Loan
6 January 2023	(Portugal) Dinis Almeida	R Antwerp FC	(Bulgaria) PFC Ludogorets Razgrad	Undisclosed
6 January 2023	Martin Wasinski	RSC Charleroi	KV Kortrijk	Loan
6 January 2023	(France) Thibault Peyre	KV Mechelen	(Saudi Arabia) Al Batin FC	Free
7 January 2023	Jens Cools	(Saudi Arabia) Al-Riyadh SC	Lierse Kempenzonen	Free
10 January 2023	(Turkey) Halil Akbunar	KVC Westerlo	(Turkey) Eyüpspor	Undisclosed
10 January 2023	(France) Vincent Koziello	KV Oostende	RE Virton	Loan
10 January 2023	(Austria) Raphael Holzhauser	OH Leuven	(Germany) TSV 1860 Munich	Loan
10 January 2023	(Japan) Yuta Miyamoto	(Japan) Urawa Red Diamonds	KMSK Deinze	Loan
11 January 2023	(Ivory Coast) Benjamin Karamoko	RSC Charleroi	(Bulgaria) Spartak Varna	Undisclosed
12 January 2023	(Sweden) Henrik Bellman	(Sweden) Östersunds FK	RSC Anderlecht	Free
12 January 2023	Lennart Mertens	Club Brugge	KMSK Deinze	Undisclosed
12 January 2023	Alessio Chiffi	RWDM47	SK Pepingen-Halle	Loan
12 January 2023	(Guinea) Ibrahim Diakité	(France) Stade de Reims	KAS Eupen	Loan
12 January 2023	(France) Leroy Abanda	R.F.C. Seraing (1922)	(Greece) PAS Lamia 1964	Loan
13 January 2023	(Norway) Andreas Hanche-Olsen	KAA Gent	(Germany) 1. FSV Mainz 05	Undisclosed
13 January 2023	Ameen Al-Dakhil	Sint-Truidense V.V.	(England) Burnley F.C.	Undisclosed
13 January 2023	Marciano Aziz	KAS Eupen	(Iceland) HK Kópavogs	Undisclosed
14 January 2023	(Portugal) Leandro Rocha	Lierse Kempenzonen	(Poland) Radomiak Radom	Undisclosed
14 January 2023	Noah Mbamba	Club Brugge	(Germany) Bayer Leverkusen	Undisclosed
14 January 2023	Hugo Siquet	(Germany) SC Freiburg	Cercle Brugge	Loan
14 January 2023	(Croatia) Ivan Durdov	(Slovenia) NK Domžale	KV Oostende	Undisclosed
14 January 2023	(England) Josef Bursik	(England) Stoke City F.C.	Club Brugge	Undisclosed
15 January 2023	(Denmark) Anders Dreyer	(Denmark) FC Midtjylland	RSC Anderlecht	Undisclosed
15 January 2023	Amine Benchaib	KV Kortrijk	(Romania) CS Mioveni	Undisclosed
16 January 2023	(Ghana) Elisha Owusu	KAA Gent	(France) AJ Auxerre	Undisclosed
17 January 2023	(Poland) Kamil Piątkowski	(Austria) FC Red Bull Salzburg	KAA Gent	Loan
17 January 2023	(Germany) Rocco Reitz	(Germany) Borussia Mönchengladbach	Sint-Truidense V.V.	Loan
17 January 2023	Alexandre De Bruyn	KV Kortrijk	FCV Dender EH	Loan
17 January 2023	Ayman Kassimi	Free agent	K.M.S.K. Deinze	Free
18 January 2023	Anouar Ait El Hadj	RSC Anderlecht	KRC Genk	Undisclosed
18 January 2023	(Morocco) Sofian Chakla	OH Leuven	(Spain) SD Ponferradina	Free
18 January 2023	(Senegal) Sambou Soumano	KAS Eupen	(France) Lorient	End of loan
18 January 2023	(Cameroon) Pierre Akono	KAS Eupen	(Spain) CD Alcoyano	Free
18 January 2023	(Canada) Eskander Mzoughi	OH Leuven	(Canada) Valour FC	Free
19 January 2023	Alessandro Albanese	KV Oostende	RE Virton	Loan
19 January 2023	(Czech Republic) Jan Král	KAS Eupen	(Czech Republic) FK Jablonec	Loan
19 January 2023	(Austria) Kelvin Arase	(Germany) Karlsruher SC	KV Oostende	Loan
19 January 2023	(Slovakia) David Hrnčár	(Slovakia) ŠK Slovan Bratislava	S.K. Beveren	Loan
20 January 2023	(Switzerland) Michael Frey	Royal Antwerp F.C.	(Germany) FC Schalke 04	Loan
21 January 2023	(Australia) James Jeggo	KAS Eupen	(Scotland) Hibernian F.C.	Undisclosed
21 January 2023	Ryan Safari	Royale Union Saint-Gilloise	Lierse Kempenzonen	Loan
21 January 2023	Gilles Ruyssen	RWDM47	FCV Dender EH	Transfer
23 January 2023	Brandon Baiye	(France) Clermont Foot	KAS Eupen	Undisclosed
23 January 2023	(Japan) Taichi Hara	(Spain) Deportivo Alavés	Sint-Truidense V.V.	Loan
23 January 2023	(Ukraine) Eduard Sobol	Club Brugge	(France) Strasbourg	Transfer
23 January 2023	(Denmark) Jacob Buus	S.K. Beveren	(Denmark) AC Horsens	Transfer
24 January 2023	(Canada) Cyle Larin	Club Brugge	(Spain) Real Valladolid	Loan
24 January 2023	Sébastien Dewaest	KRC Genk	(Cyprus) AEL Limassol	Free
24 January 2023	(Guinea) Maï Traoré	(Norway) Viking FK	OH Leuven	Loan
25 January 2023	(South Africa) Lyle Foster	KVC Westerlo	(England) Burnley F.C.	Transfer
25 January 2023	(Morocco) Selim Amallah	Standard Liège	(Spain) Real Valladolid	Transfer
26 January 2023	(Romania) Denis Drăguș	Standard Liège	(Italy) Genoa C.F.C.	Loan
26 January 2023	(Montenegro) Aleksandar Boljević	Standard Liège	(Israel) Hapoel Tel Aviv F.C.	Transfer
26 January 2023	Sekou Diawara	K.R.C. Genk	(Italy) Udinese Calcio	Transfer
26 January 2023	(Brazil) Willian Klaus	(Brazil) Botafogo	RWDM47	Transfer
26 January 2023	(France) Emeric Dudouit	(France) FC Versailles 78	RE Virton	Transfer
27 January 2023	(Hungary) András Németh	K.R.C. Genk	(Germany) Hamburger SV	Transfer
27 January 2023	Julien Duranville	R.S.C. Anderlecht	(Germany) Borussia Dortmund	Transfer
27 January 2023	Lucas Kalala	Standard Liège	Royal FC Mandel United	Loan
28 January 2023	Yorbe Vertessen	(Netherlands) PSV Eindhoven	Royale Union Saint-Gilloise	Loan
28 January 2023	(Netherlands) Gyrano Kerk	(Russia) FC Lokomotiv Moscow	Royal Antwerp F.C.	Loan
28 January 2023	(Brazil) Camilo	(France) Olympique Lyonnais	RWDM47	Loan
30 January 2023	(Japan) Yusuke Matsuo	(Japan) Urawa Red Diamonds	KVC Westerlo	Transfer
30 January 2023	(Denmark) Nikolas Dyhr	(Denmark) FC Midtjylland	KV Kortrijk	Loan
30 January 2023	(Ivory Coast) Christian Akpan	(Ivory Coast) ASEC Mimosas	KRC Genk	Transfer
30 January 2023	(Ivory Coast) Vakoun Issouf Bayo	(England) Watford F.C.	RSC Charleroi	Loan
30 January 2023	(Ghana) Emmanuel Toku	(Bulgaria) Botev Plovdiv	OH Leuven	Transfer
31 January 2023	(Serbia) Nikola Štulić	(Serbia) Radnički Niš	RSC Charleroi	Undisclosed
31 January 2023	(Nigeria) Valentine Ozornwafor	(France) Sochaux	RSC Charleroi	End of loan
31 January 2023	(Spain) Adrián Ortolá	KMSK Deinze	(Spain) CE Sabadell FC	Transfer
31 January 2023	(Poland) Karol Fila	(France) RC Strasbourg Alsace	SV Zulte Waregem	Loan
31 January 2023	(Mali) Yacouba Sylla	(Romania) FC Botoșani	RE Virton	Free
31 January 2023	(Ukraine) Oleksandr Filin	(Russia) FC Khimki	KAS Eupen	Free
31 January 2023	(Colombia) Éder Álvarez Balanta	Club Brugge	(Germany) FC Schalke 04	Loan
31 January 2023	Anthony Descotte	RSC Charleroi	(Netherlands) FC Utrecht	Loan
31 January 2023	(Togo) Loïc Bessilé	RSC Charleroi	KAS Eupen	Loan
31 January 2023	(Japan) Shinji Kagawa	Sint-Truidense V.V.	(Japan) Cerezo Osaka	Free
31 January 2023	Mathias Delorge	Sint-Truidense V.V.	Lierse Kempenzonen	Loan
31 January 2023	(Ghana) Nathan Opoku	(England) Leicester City	OH Leuven	Loan
31 January 2023	(Switzerland) Henri Koide	(Switzerland) FC Zürich	K Beerschot VA	Free
31 January 2023	(France) Nicksoen Gomis	(England) Sheffield United F.C.	K Beerschot VA	Loan
31 January 2023	(Sweden) Amar Abdirahman Ahmed	(France) ES Troyes AC	Lommel S.K.	Loan
31 January 2023	Nicolas Raskin	Standard Liège	(Scotland) Rangers F.C.	Transfer
31 January 2023	(Cameroon) Jerome Ngom Mbekeli	(Cameroon) Colombe Sport	S.K. Beveren	Transfer
31 January 2023	(Nigeria) Tolu Arokodare	(Latvia) Valmiera	Genk	Transfer
31 January 2023	(Switzerland) Bastien Toma	(Portugal) Paços de Ferreira	Genk	End of loan
31 January 2023	Aske Sampers	Cercle Brugge	Lierse Kempenzonen	Undisclosed
31 January 2023	(France) Louis Torres	Cercle Brugge	(France) Rodez	Loan
1 February 2023	(Nigeria) Paul Onuachu	Genk	(England) Southampton	Undisclosed
1 February 2023	(Ivory Coast) Aboubakar Keita	(Israel) Sektzia Ness Ziona	RSC Charleroi	End of loan
1 February 2023	(Ivory Coast) Aboubakar Keita	RSC Charleroi	(Sweden) AIK	Free
1 February 2023	(Spain) Davo	(Poland) Wisła Płock	KAS Eupen	Free
2 February 2023	(Iran) Ali Gholizadeh	RSC Charleroi	(Turkey) Kasımpaşa	Loan
3 February 2023	(Lithuania) Nauris Petkevičius	K Beerschot VA	RSC Charleroi	End of loan
3 February 2023	(Lithuania) Nauris Petkevičius	RSC Charleroi	(Lithuania) Žalgiris	Loan
14 February 2023	(Bulgaria) Dimitar Velkovski	Cercle Brugge	(Poland) Miedź Legnica	Undisclosed
5 March 2023	(France) Lucas Larade	Cercle Brugge	(Norway) Jerv	Undisclosed
