= Jordy Gillekens =

Belgian footballer (born 2000)

Personal information
- Date of birth: 18 February 2000 (age 26)
- Place of birth: Belgium
- Height: 1.87 m (6 ft 2 in)
- Position: Centre-back

Team information
- Current team: SV Wehen Wiesbaden
- Number: 27

Youth career
- –2017: OH Leuven

Senior career*
Years	Team	Apps	(Gls)
2017–2021	OH Leuven	7	(0)
2018–2019	→ Fiorentina (loan)	0	(0)
2021	→ Lierse SK (loan)	12	(0)
2021–2023	Lierse SK	45	(0)
2023–2025	Francs Borains	49	(1)
2025–	Wehen Wiesbaden	37	(3)

International career
2016–2017	Belgium U17	6	(0)
2017	Belgium U18	1	(0)
- * Club domestic league appearances and goals as of 29 May 2026

Jordy Gillekens (born 18 February 2000) is a Belgian professional footballer who plays for SV Wehen Wiesbaden in the 3. Liga. He is a former Belgian youth international.

== Club career ==
Gillekens was given his first professional contract with Oud-Heverlee Leuven in May 2017, and joined the club's under-19 team. Gillekens made his professional debut for OH Leuven on 5 August 2017 in the home match against Lierse.

On 24 July 2018, Gillekens agreed a new three-year contract with Leuven, and joined Italian club ACF Fiorentina on a year-long loan, with Fiorentina holding the option to sign him permanently. He played for the club's youth team in the Campionato Primavera 1. During his time at Fiorentina, he won the Coppa Italia Primavera. He returned to Leuven following his loan spell after Fiorentina did not exercise their option to sign him permanently.

On 11 January 2021, Gillekens joined Lierse S.K. on loan until the end of the season. On 19 March 2021, it was announced Gillekens would join Lierse S.K. on a free transfer and sign a two-year contract, following the expiry of his contract with Leuven in the summer. He made 12 league appearances during his loan spell and a subsequent 45 league appearances over the following two seasons at the club.

He signed for newly promoted Challenger Pro League club Francs Borains in July 2023. He played in 49 league matches for the club and scored once.

On 4 July 2025, Gillekens joined German 3. Liga club Wehen Wiesbaden on a three-year contract. He made his debut for the club on 3 August 2025, starting a 3–1 win over SSV Ulm in the club's opening game of the season. He played in the club's narrow 3–2 DFB-Pokal defeat to Bayern Munich on 27 August, and swapped shirts with striker Harry Kane following the match.

== International career ==
Gillekens was called up to the Belgium national under-17 team in March 2017. He played 6 times for the under-17 team and once for the under-18 team.

== Personal life ==
He is the younger brother of fellow footballer Nick Gillekens, who plays as a goalkeeper.
