= Aboubakar Keita =

Ivorian footballer (born 1997)

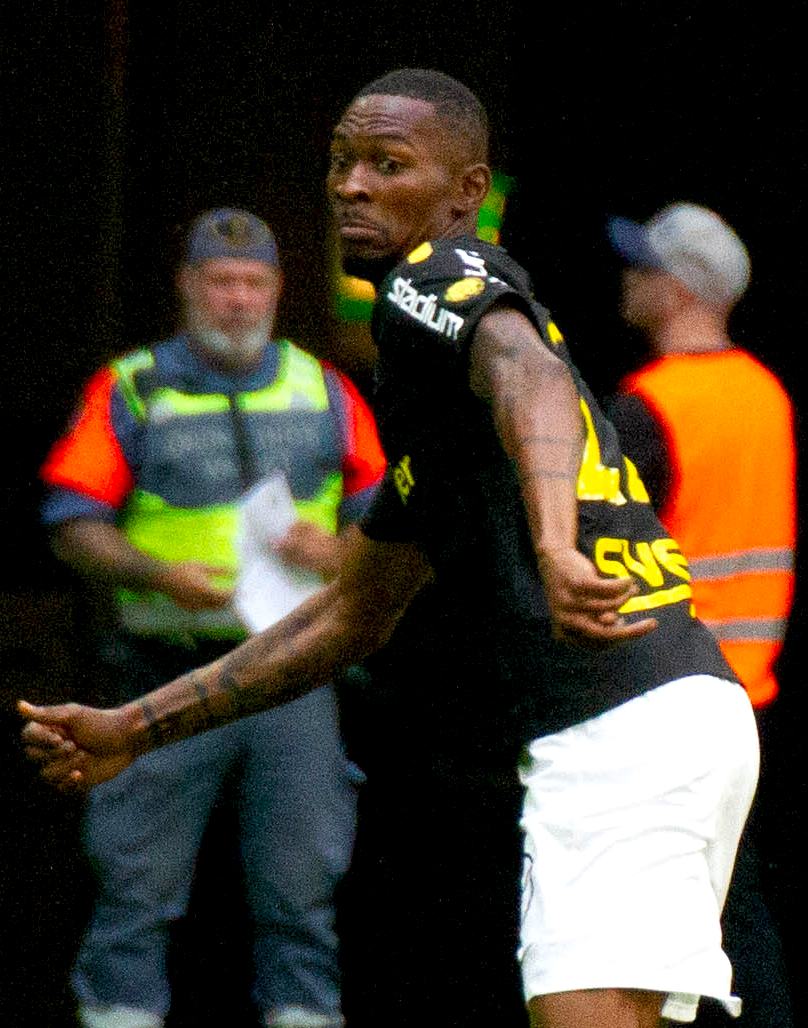

Personal information
- Date of birth: 5 November 1997 (age 29)
- Place of birth: Abidjan, Ivory Coast
- Height: 1.88 m (6 ft 2 in)
- Positions: Defensive midfielder; centre-back

Team information
- Current team: Sepsi OSK
- Number: 8

Youth career
- –2015: ATM Abobo
- 2015: Copenhagen

Senior career*
Years	Team	Apps	(Gls)
2016–2019	Copenhagen	4	(0)
2017	→ Halmstad BK (loan)	25	(2)
2018	→ Stabæk (loan)	10	(2)
2019	→ OH Leuven (loan)	5	(0)
2019–2021	OH Leuven	23	(0)
2021–2023	Charleroi	1	(0)
2021–2022	→ RWDM Molenbeek (loan)	18	(0)
2022–2023	→ Sektzia Ness Ziona (loan)	16	(0)
2023	AIK	14	(0)
2024	Újpest	15	(1)
2024–2025	Nyíregyháza	30	(1)
2025–2026	Diósgyőr	19	(2)
2026–	Sepsi OSK	4	(0)

International career
2012	Ivory Coast U16	1	(0)
2013	Ivory Coast U17	5	(1)
2015	Ivory Coast U20	3	(0)
2019	Ivory Coast Olympic	5	(0)
Medal record
Representing Ivory Coast
Men's football
U-23 Africa Cup of Nations
Runner-up	2019 Egypt
- * Club domestic league appearances and goals as of 1 November 2026

Aboubakar Keita (born 5 November 1997) is an Ivorian professional footballer who plays as a defensive midfielder or a centre-back for Liga I club Sepsi OSK.

== Club career ==
=== F.C. Copenhagen ===
After having visited F.C. Copenhagen on multiple occasions, Keita signed a contract with the club shortly after his 18th birthday in November 2015, playing the remainder of the autumn with the under-19 team. On 11 January 2016 Keita was promoted to the first team squad.

On 13 March 2016, Keita debuted for the first team, when he substituted William Kvist in the Danish Superliga match against AaB. Three days later, he was in the starting eleven in the Danish Cup game against Randers FC.

Keita signed a loan deal with Norwegian club Stabæk to June 2019.

=== Charleroi ===
In July 2022, Keita was loaned to Israeli club Sektzia Ness Ziona. During the 2022–23 winter transfer window, he returned from Israel.

=== AIK ===
On 1 February 2023, Keita signed with Swedish club AIK until the end of 2024.

=== Diósgyőr ===
On 3 September 2025, Keita signed with Nemzeti Bajnokság I club Diósgyőri VTK.

== International career ==
He debuted for the Ivory Coast U23s in a 5–1 loss to France U21, scoring the only goal for his team in the game.

== Honours ==
=== Club ===
Copenhagen

- Danish Superliga: 2015–16
- Danish Cup: 2015–16

Ivory Coast U23

- Africa U-23 Cup of Nations runner-up:2019
