= Brent Laes =

Belgian footballer

Personal information
- Date of birth: 18 April 2000 (age 26)
- Place of birth: Bertem, Belgium
- Height: 1.74 m (5 ft 9 in)
- Position: Left back

Team information
- Current team: Dessel Sport

Youth career
- Rapid Bertem
- Oud-Heverlee Leuven

Senior career*
Years	Team	Apps	(Gls)
2020–2021	Oud-Heverlee Leuven	1	(0)
2021	→ Lierse Kempenzonen (loan)	13	(0)
2021–2023	Lierse Kempenzonen	50	(2)
2023–2024	Oostende	24	(1)
2024–2026	Lierse	12	(1)
2026–	Dessel Sport		

International career
2018	Belgium U18	1	(0)
2018	Belgium U19	2	(0)
- * Club domestic league appearances and goals as of 18 July 2026

Brent Laes (born 18 April 2000) is a Belgian professional footballer who is currently unemployed after most recently playing for Dessel Sport in the Belgian Division 1.

== Career ==
Laes made his professional debut for OH Leuven on 23 August 2019 in a Belgian Cup match against Wetteren. Some months later in February 2020, he also played his first league match for the club, 4–1 away loss against Virton.

In January 2021, he was loaned out to Belgian First Division B club Lierse Kempenzonen. At the end of the season, he made a permanent move to the club.
