= Amîr Lemti =

Belgian footballer

Personal information
- Full name: Amîr Lemti
- Date of birth: 26 October 2000 (age 26)
- Place of birth: Belgium
- Height: 1.76 m (5 ft 9 in)
- Position: Midfielder

Team information
- Current team: Rupel Boom
- Number: 26

Youth career
- –2015: Woluwe-Zaventem
- 2015–: OH Leuven

Senior career*
Years	Team	Apps	(Gls)
2020	OH Leuven	1	(3)
2020–2024	Heist	40	(4)
2024–	Rupel Boom	24	(1)
- * Club domestic league appearances and goals as of 11:47, 23 January 2026 (UTC)

Amîr Lemti (born 26 October 2000) is a Belgian footballer who plays for Rupel Boom in the Belgian Division 2.

Lemti made his professional debut for OH Leuven on 28 February 2020 in the away match against Virton, a 4–1 loss.
