= Thierno Gaye =

Senegalese footballer (born 1999)

Personal information
- Date of birth: 20 November 1999 (age 26)
- Place of birth: Senegal
- Height: 1.78 m (5 ft 10 in)
- Position: Wing-back

Youth career
- 2019–2020: OH Leuven

Senior career*
Years	Team	Apps	(Gls)
2020	OH Leuven	1	(0)
2021–2022	Swift Hesperange	4	(0)
2022–2023	Olympic Charleroi	27	(2)
2024	Rebecq	5	(0)
2024–2025	Olympic Charleroi	21	(5)
2025–2026	Seraing	19	(0)
- * Club domestic league appearances and goals as of 20 April 2026

Thierno Gaye (born 20 November 1999) is a Senegalese professional footballer.

Gaye made his professional debut for OH Leuven on 11 February 2020 in the home match against Union SG, getting suspended at the hour mark after collecting two yellow cards.
