= Yanis Mbombo =

Belgian footballer

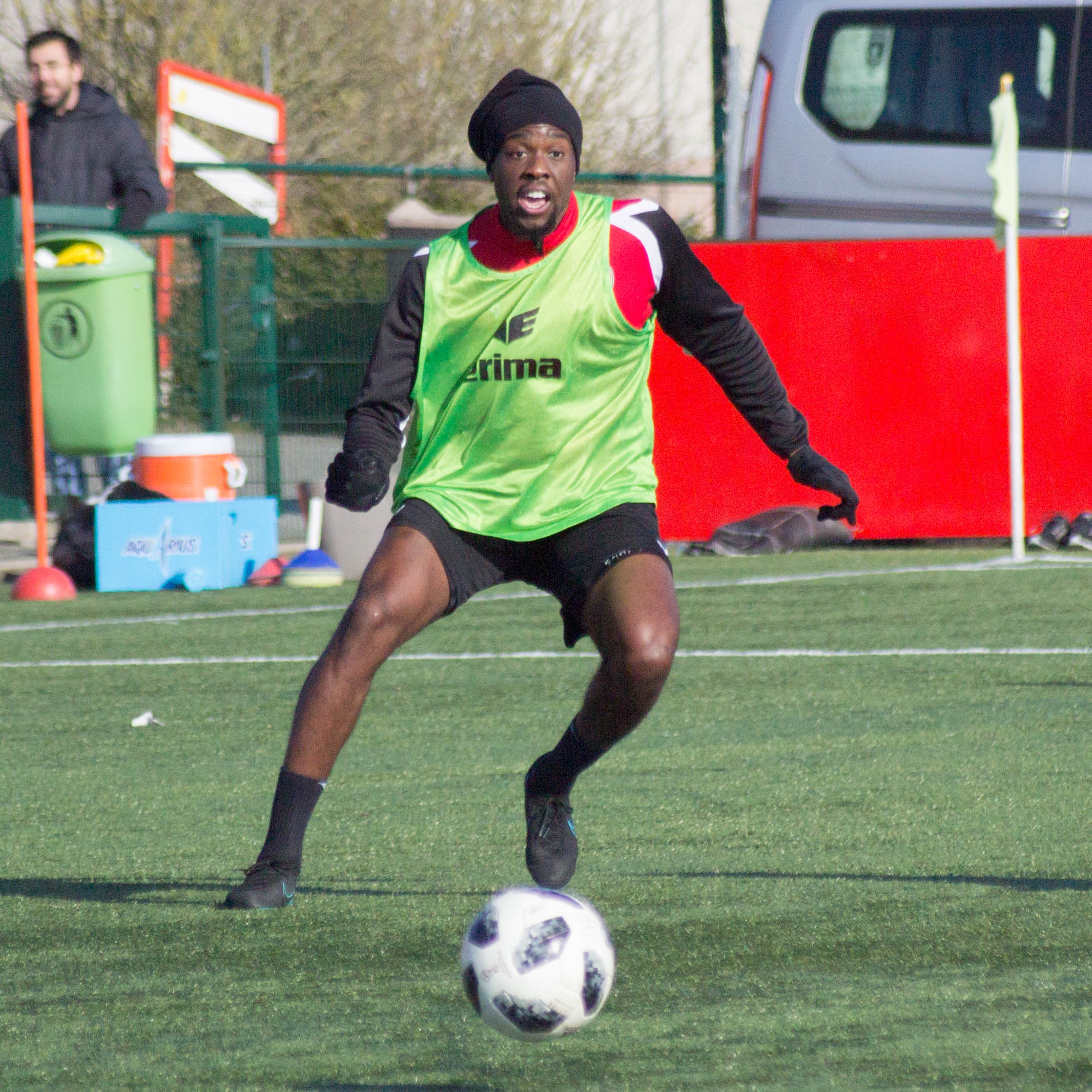
- Mbombo in Mouscron training in 2018

Personal information
- Full name: Yanis Mbombo Lokwa
- Date of birth: 8 April 1994 (age 32)
- Place of birth: Brussels, Belgium
- Height: 1.80 m (5 ft 11 in)
- Position: Forward

Team information
- Current team: Union Namur

Youth career
- Anderlecht
- RWDM Brussels
- Mechelen

Senior career*
Years	Team	Apps	(Gls)
2013–2017	Standard Liège	6	(1)
2014–2015	→ Auxerre (loan)	8	(3)
2015	→ Sint-Truiden (loan)	9	(2)
2016–2017	→ Sochaux (loan)	11	(1)
2017	Örebro SK	4	(0)
2017–2018	Mouscron	30	(3)
2019–2020	OH Leuven	25	(4)
2020	Lausanne Ouchy	1	(0)
2021	Vilafranquense	6	(0)
2021	Lyon La Duchère	10	(3)
2022	Virton	4	(0)
2022	Brașov	4	(0)
2023	RANS Nusantara	8	(2)
2023–2025	Virton	29	(2)
2026	Rodange	9	(5)
2026–	Union Namur	2	(0)

International career
2011	Belgium U17	1	(0)
2011	Belgium U18	3	(1)
2014	Belgium U21	2	(0)
- * Club domestic league appearances and goals as of 26 September 2026

Yanis Mbombo Lokwa (born 8 April 1994) is a Belgian professional footballer who plays as a forward for Belgian Division 2 club Union Namur.

== Club career ==
Born in Brussels, Mbombo is a youth exponent of Standard Liège. He made his professional debut for the club on 12 December 2013 in a UEFA Europa League game against Swedish side IF Elfsborg as a starter. He played the full game and scored the only goal for Standard, losing 3–1.

On 4 January 2022, Mbombo signed for Belgian First Division B side Virton.
