= Tom Van Hyfte =

Belgian footballer

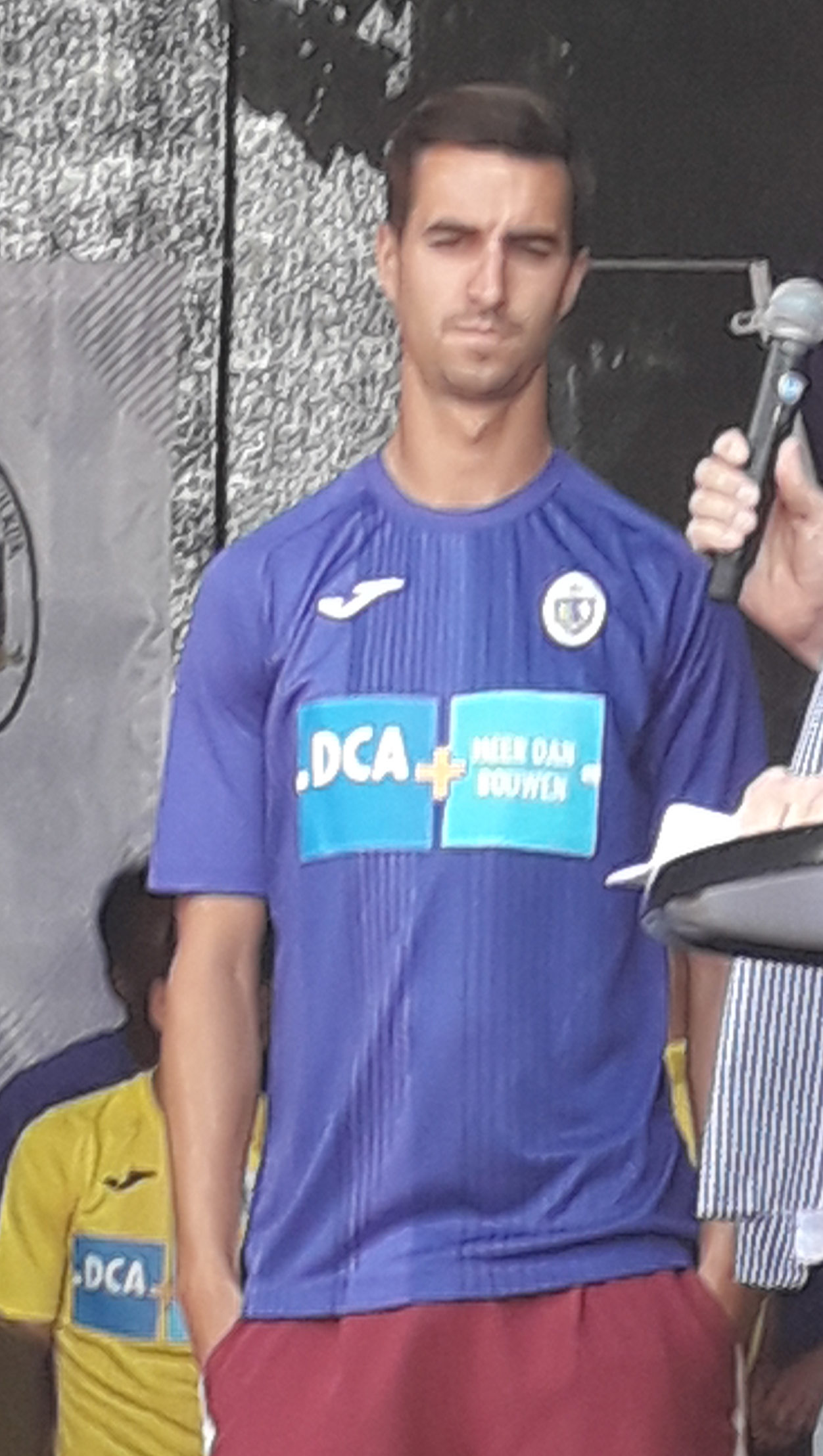

Personal information
- Full name: Tom Van Hyfte
- Date of birth: 28 April 1986 (age 40)
- Place of birth: Ghent, Belgium
- Height: 1.86 m (6 ft 1 in)
- Position: Midfielder

Team information
- Current team: Evergem 2020

Youth career
- vv Wippelgem
- Anderlecht

Senior career*
Years	Team	Apps	(Gls)
2004–2009	Hamme	148	(21)
2009–2014	MVV Maastricht	167	(35)
2014–2017	Roda JC	100	(16)
2017–2019	Beerschot Wilrijk	61	(8)
2019–2021	Oud-Heverlee Leuven	27	(3)
2021–2022	Mandel United	0	(0)
2022–	Evergem 2020	0	(0)
- * Club domestic league appearances and goals as of 18 June 2017

Tom Van Hyfte (born 26 April 1986) is a Belgian professional footballer who currently plays as a midfielder for Evergem 2020 in the Belgian Provincial Leagues.
