= Darren Keet =

South African soccer player

Personal information
- Full name: Darren Keet
- Date of birth: 5 August 1989 (age 37)
- Place of birth: Cape Town, South Africa
- Height: 1.83 m (6 ft 0 in)
- Position: Goalkeeper

Team information
- Current team: Durban City
- Number: 1

Youth career
- Ajax Cape Town
- Edgemead
- –2007: Bothasig AFC

Senior career*
Years	Team	Apps	(Gls)
2007–2008	Vasco Da Gama		
2008–2011	Bidvest Wits	54	(0)
2011–2016	KV Kortrijk	141	(0)
2016–2019	Bidvest Wits	58	(0)
2019–2020	OH Leuven	8	(0)
2021	Cape Umoya United	6	(0)
2021–2025	Cape Town City	87	(0)
2025–2026	Durban City	15	(0)

International career^{‡}
2013–2020	South Africa	13	(0)
- * Club domestic league appearances and goals as of 4 January 2026 ‡ National team caps and goals as of 2 October 2020

Darren Keet (born 5 August 1989) is a South African former professional soccer player who played asgoalkeeper for the likes of Durban City,Cape Town City,KV Kortrijk and the South Africa National Football Team

== Club career ==
Born in Cape Town, Keet was a member of the Vasco Da Gama squad that won promotion to the National First Division in 2008 before joining Premiership side Bidvest Wits. He made his Premiership debut with the Students in 2008 and quickly established himself as the club's number one goalkeeper making 54 league appearances until he signed for the Belgian club KV Kortrijk in June 2011 on a four-year contract.

At the age of 36, Keet was in goal for Durban City's win in the 2025–26 Nedbank Cup. Following the match, Keet announced that he would be retiring at the end of that season.

== International career ==
On 10 September 2013, Keet made his international debut for South Africa in a friendly against Zimbabwe at Orlando Stadium, starting and playing the full 90 minutes in a 2–1 loss. Before the match he told that he wanted "to prove my worth to South Africa".
