= Daan Vekemans =

Belgian footballer

Personal information
- Date of birth: 22 February 2000 (age 26)
- Place of birth: Belgium
- Height: 1.80 m (5 ft 11 in)
- Position: Forward

Team information
- Current team: Houtvenne
- Number: 22

Youth career
- KFC Herent
- –2018: OH Leuven

Senior career*
| Years | Team | Apps | (Gls) |
| 2018–2022 | OH Leuven | 22 | (0) |
| 2019 | → Eendracht Aalst (loan) | 9 | (2) |
| 2022–2024 | Lierse | 26 | (3) |
| 2024– | Houtvenne | 43 | (13) |
- * Club domestic league appearances and goals as of 3 May 2026

Daan Vekemans (born 22 February 2000) is a Belgian professional footballer who plays for Houtvenne in the Belgian Division 2.

== Club career ==
Vekemans made his debut for OH Leuven on 18 February 2018 in the home match against Beerschot Wilrijk, three days before his 18th birthday.

On 2 June 2022, Vekemans signed a two-year contract with Lierse.

== Personal life ==
His sister Elien Vekemans is a pole vaulter.
