= Arthur Allemeersch =

Belgian footballer (born 2001)

Personal information
- Full name: Arthur Frans Allemeersch
- Date of birth: 27 July 2001 (age 25)
- Place of birth: Bertem, Belgium
- Height: 1.83 m (6 ft 0 in)
- Position: Forward

Team information
- Current team: Belisia Bilzen
- Number: 39

Youth career
- 2011–2019: OH Leuven

Senior career*
Years	Team	Apps	(Gls)
2019–2022	OH Leuven	7	(0)
2022–2025	TOP Oss	90	(10)
2025–	Belisia Bilzen	30	(5)
- * Club domestic league appearances and goals as of 3 May 2026

Arthur Frans Allemeersch (born 27 July 2001) is a Belgian professional footballer who plays as a forward for Belisia Bilzen.

== Career ==
Allemeersch played his first match on 23 August 2019 in a Belgian Cup match against Wetteren, scoring once in a 6–0 win. One week later he was subbed on again in an away win at Lokeren.

On 20 June 2022, Allemeersch joined Eerste Divisie club TOP Oss.
