= Yannick Aguemon =

Beninese footballer (born 1992)

Personal information
- Date of birth: 11 February 1992 (age 34)
- Place of birth: Cotonou, Benin
- Height: 1.80 m (5 ft 11 in)
- Positions: Striker; winger

Team information
- Current team: Créteil

Youth career
- 1998–2003: Massy
- 2003–2004: Antony Sports
- 2004–2007: Boulogne-Billancourt
- 2005–2009: INF Clairefontaine
- 2009–2011: Toulouse

Senior career*
Years	Team	Apps	(Gls)
2011–2013	Toulouse	2	(0)
2012–2013	Toulouse B	18	(2)
2013–2014	Vannes	28	(7)
2014–2015	Strasbourg	34	(0)
2015	Strasbourg B	4	(0)
2016–2017	Union SG	49	(5)
2017–2022	OH Leuven	68	(12)
2022–2023	Virton	25	(2)
2024–	Créteil	0	(0)

International career^{‡}
2012	France U20	6	(1)
2019–	Benin	5	(0)
- * Club domestic league appearances and goals as of 15 June 2023 ‡ National team caps and goals as of 1 June 2023

Yannick Aguemon (born 11 February 1992) is a Beninese professional footballer who is currently playing for Créteil in the Championnat National 1. He plays as either a striker or a winger. He also holds French citizenship.

== Club career ==
Aguemon spent three years at INF Clairefontaine academy, before joining Toulouse FC.

Aguemon made his professional debut for Toulouse on 31 August 2011, in a Coupe de la Ligue match against Nice.

On 22 July 2022, Aguemon signed with Virton.

== International career ==
In March 2019, he received his first call-up to the Benin national football team.

He made his Benin national football team debut on 6 September 2019, in a friendly against Ivory Coast, as a starter.
