= Isaac Asante =

Ghanaian footballer

Personal information
- Date of birth: 21 August 2002 (age 24)
- Place of birth: Accra, Ghana
- Height: 1.78 m (5 ft 10 in)
- Position: Attacking midfielder

Team information
- Current team: FK Panevėžys
- Number: 34

Youth career
- –2018: Lokeren U17
- 2018–2019: Lokeren Reserves
- 2019–2020: OH Leuven

Senior career*
Years	Team	Apps	(Gls)
2020–2023	OH Leuven	5	(0)
2022–2023	OH Leuven U23	16	(1)
2023–2024	Jong KV Mechelen	18	(2)
2023–2024	Mechelen	3	(0)
2025–	Panevėžys	56	(8)
- * Club domestic league appearances and goals as of 8 September 2026

Isaac Asante (born 21 August 2002) is a Ghanaian professional footballer who plays as an attacking midfielder for TOPLYGA club Panevėžys.

== Career ==
=== In Belgium ===
Asante made his professional debut for OH Leuven on 15 August 2020 in a 1–1 draw against Genk. In July 2022, Asante was sent to the OH Leuven under-23 side in the Belgian third tier for the season. He scored his first goal for the under-23 in a 1–1 match against KSK Heist on 10 September.

=== FK Panevėžys ===
On 19 February 2025 Asante signed with Lithuanian Panevėžys Club.

== Personal life ==
Born in Accra, Ghana, Asante moved to Belgium with his family at a young age.

== Career statistics ==
As of match played 18 December 2022

Club	Season	League			Cup		Europe		Other		Total	
Club	Season	Division	Apps	Goals	Apps	Goals	Apps	Goals	Apps	Goals	Apps	Goals
OH Leuven	2020–21	Belgian First Division A	5	0	0	0	—		—		5	0
OH Leuven	2021–22	Belgian First Division A	0	0	0	0	0	0	—		0	0
OH Leuven	Total		5	0	0	0	0	0	0	0	5	0
OH Leuven U23	2022–23	Belgian National Division 1	9	1	0	0	—		—		9	1
Career total			14	0	0	0	0	0	0	0	14	1
