= Xavier Mercier =

French footballer (born 1989)

Personal information
- Full name: Xavier Jacques Mercier
- Date of birth: 25 July 1989 (age 37)
- Place of birth: Alès, France
- Height: 1.74 m (5 ft 9 in)
- Position: Attacking midfielder

Team information
- Current team: GC Uchaud
- Number: 10

Youth career
- 2004–2009: Montpellier

Senior career*
Years	Team	Apps	(Gls)
2009–2010	Lesquin	12	(6)
2010–2012	Guingamp	12	(1)
2012–2014	Beauvais	59	(17)
2014–2016	Boulogne	47	(13)
2016–2017	Kortrijk	43	(7)
2017–2019	Cercle Brugge	63	(14)
2019–2022	OH Leuven	95	(15)
2022–2023	Ferencváros	16	(1)
2023–2024	RWDM	24	(2)
2024–	GC Uchaud	0	(0)
- * Club domestic league appearances and goals as of 28 March 2024

Xavier Jacques Mercier (born 25 July 1989) is a French professional footballer who plays as an attacking midfielder for GC Uchaud. He has previously represented Lesquin, Guingamp (for whom he made seven appearances in Ligue 2), Beauvais, K.V. Kortrijk, Cercle Brugge, OH Leuven, Ferencváros and RWDM.

== Career ==
In January 2008 he was called up for a training camp with the French under-21 futsal team for a 4-day camp.

=== Ferencváros ===
On 5 May 2023, he won the 2022–23 Nemzeti Bajnokság I with Ferencváros, after Kecskemét lost 1–0 to Honvéd at the Bozsik Aréna on the 30th matchday.

== Career statistics ==
As of May 2015

Appearances and goals by club, season and competition
Club	Season	League			National cup		League cup		Total	
Club	Season	Division	Apps	Goals	Apps	Goals	Apps	Goals	Apps	Goals
Lesquin	2009–10	CFA2 Group B	12	6	0	0	0	0	12	6
Guingamp	2010–11	National	5	1	2	0	0	0	7	1
Guingamp	2011–12	Ligue 2	7	0	1	0	1	0	9	0
Guingamp	Total		12	1	3	0	1	0	16	1
Beauvais	2012–13	CFA Group A	32	8	1	1	0	0	33	9
Beauvais	2013–14	CFA Group A	27	9	3	2	0	0	30	11
Beauvais	Total		59	17	4	3	0	0	63	20
Boulogne	2014–15	National	31	7	8	6	0	0	39	13
Boulogne	2015–16	National	9	5	1	0	0	0	10	5
Boulogne	Total		40	12	9	6	0	0	49	18
Career total			123	36	16	9	1	0	140	45

== Honours ==
Ferencváros

- Nemzeti Bajnokság I: 2022–23

Individual

- Belgian Pro League top assist provider: 2020–21
