= Mathieu Maertens =

Belgian footballer

Personal information
- Full name: Mathieu Maertens
- Date of birth: 27 March 1995 (age 31)
- Place of birth: Leuven, Belgium
- Height: 1.82 m (6 ft 0 in)
- Position: Attacking midfielder

Team information
- Current team: Cambuur

Youth career
- –2014: Cercle Brugge

Senior career*
Years	Team	Apps	(Gls)
2014–2017	Cercle Brugge	66	(6)
2017–2026	OH Leuven	238	(41)
2026–	Cambuur	0	(0)
- * Club domestic league appearances and goals as of 25 May 2026

Mathieu Maertens (born 27 March 1995) is a Belgian footballer who plays as an attacking midfielder and is currently playing for Cambuur in the Eredivisie. Maertens played 9 seasons for OH Leuven and became second on the all-time appearance list for the club, only surpassed by club legend Bjorn Ruytinx.

== Club career ==
Maertens made his senior debut for Cercle Brugge on 29 March 2014 in the Jupiler Pro League. He played the full game in a 4–0 away defeat against KV Kortrijk.
