= Den Dreef =

Belgium football stadium

King Power at Den Dreef
- Den Dreef
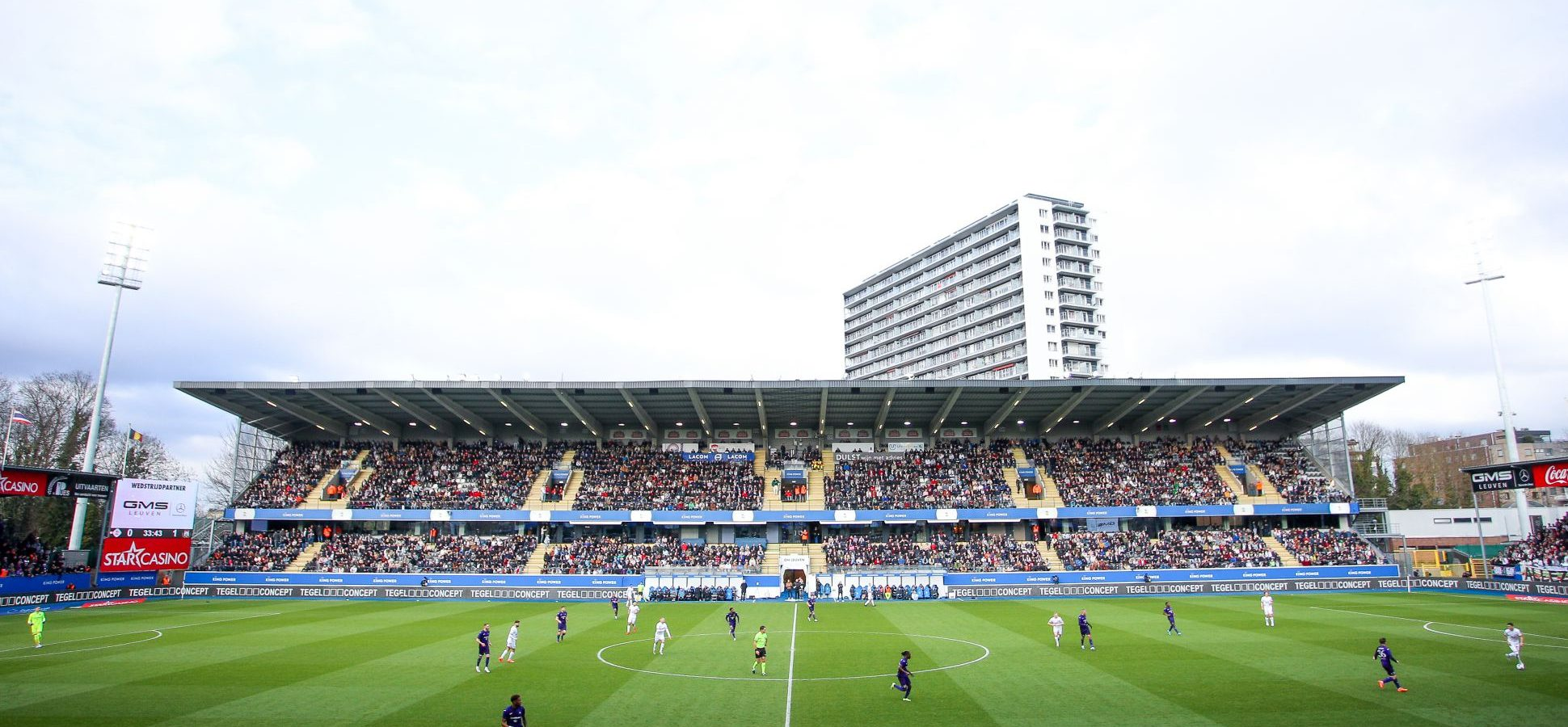
- Den Dreef in 2024
- Interactive map of King Power at Den Dreef
- Full name: King Power at Den Dreef
- Location: Heverlee, Belgium
- Coordinates: 50°52′6″N 4°41′39″E
- Operator: Oud-Heverlee Leuven
- Capacity: 9,809
- Surface: Grass

Construction
- Opened: 2002

Tenants
- Oud-Heverlee Leuven; Red Flames; Belgium U-21

Den Dreef, also known as King Power at Den Dreef for sponsorship reasons, is a football stadium situated on Kardinaal Mercierlaan in the Heverlee suburb of Leuven in Belgium. It is home to Jupiler Pro League football team Oud-Heverlee Leuven and hosts the home matches of the Belgium women's national football team and the Belgium national under-21 football team. The entrance for visiting spectators is on Tervuursevest.

== Extensions ==
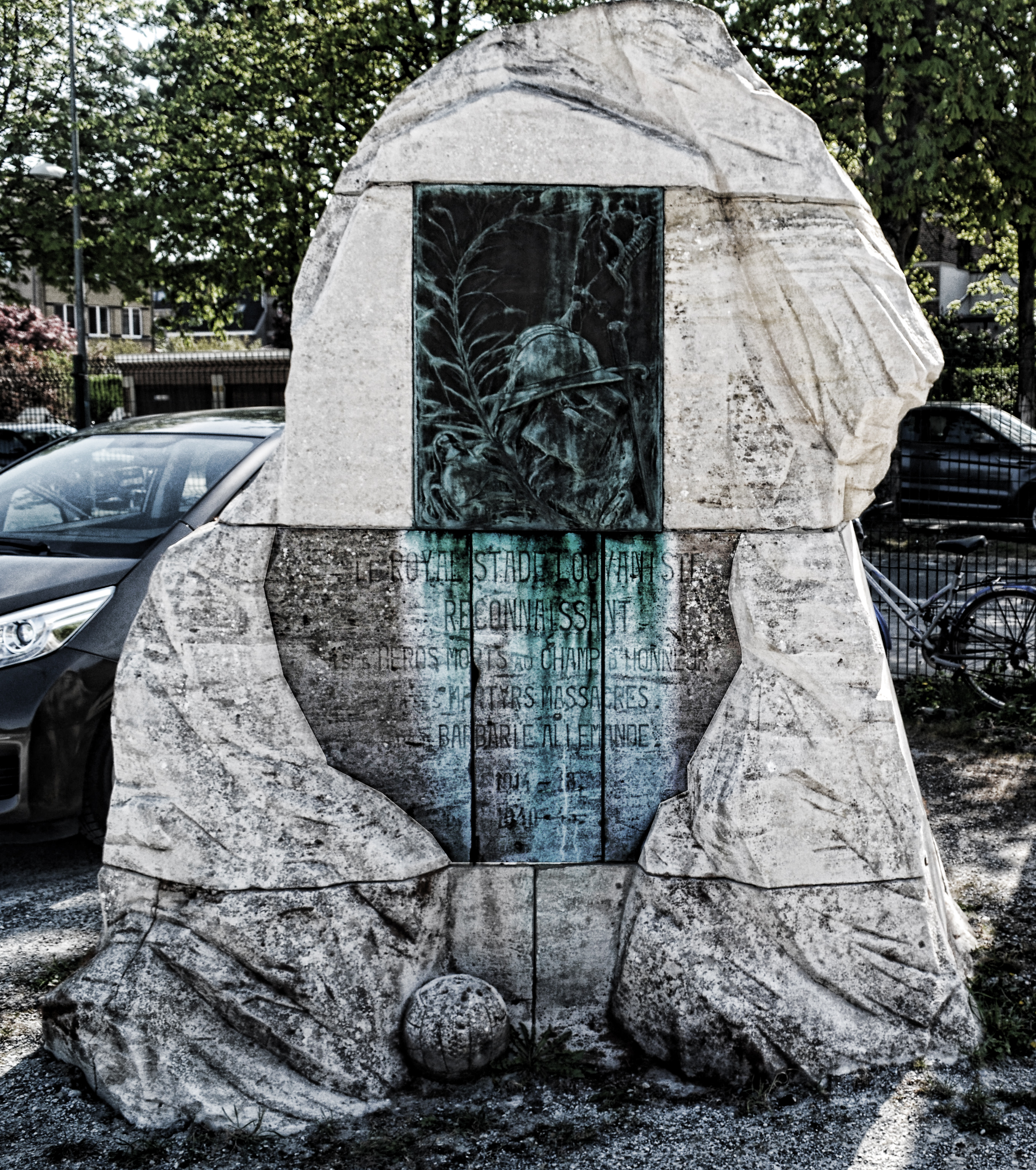
Belgian World War Memorial stone with inscriptions in French : "Le Royal Stade Louvainiste Reconnaissant heroes morts au champ d' honneur, martyrs massacres, barbarie Allemande 1914-1918 1940-1945" (translated: "Royal Stade Louvainiste Recognizes the dead heroes in the field of honor and martyrs massacres by German barbarism 1914-1918 1940-1945")

With the establishment of Oud-Heverlee Leuven in 2002, the stadium changed its name from Leuvens Sportcentrum to Den Dreef. At that point the stadium had a track and field layout, with the pitch surrounded by tartan track running lanes. There was one main stand with seats approximately two-thirds of the length of the pitch and a smaller stand with covered standing terracing on the opposite side. Both of these were covered, whereas in both curves the standing places were not covered. The initial layout was such that visiting teams used the north curve and received a part of the smaller stand.

A first extension came when the curves were demolished and new covered single tier stands were built on top of the track behind both goals, which allowed the supporters to sit much closer to the field. The one behind the goal to the west is normally reserved for visiting supporters.

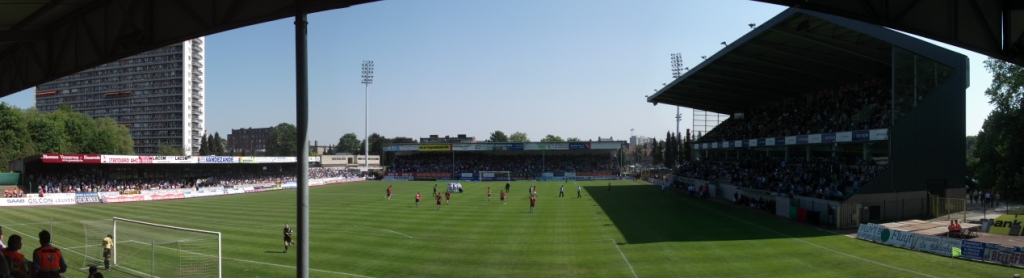
Den Dreef in 2011

In the summer of 2011 the lower tier of the main stand was extended to run the whole length of the pitch, increasing the capacity of the stadium to 8,519 in preparation for the larger attendances expected following Oud-Heverlee Leuven's promotion to the Belgian Pro League in season 2010-11. In the summer of 2012 the upper tier of the main stand was also extended, further increasing the stadium capacity to 9,493 and adding extra space to its corporate entertainment and conference facilities.

In December 2015 the stand opposite the main stand was demolished and replaced with a similar stand as the main stand. This new stand has been in use since the 2016-17 season and contains skyboxes, media facilities and the dressing rooms which were previously located in a separate building some 20 meters outside of the stadium. The capacity has increased further to 10,020. At this point the stadium no longer had places reserved for standing, but both smaller stands behind the goals are typically used by supporters that stand rather than sit.

OH Leuven has announced further plans to expand the stadium, stating that the expansion in 2016 was just phase one of a three phase expansion plan. Phase two will involve expanding the smaller stand behind the west side goal and connecting it to the main stand, increasing the capacity to 11,000. During the third phase the smaller stand on the east side will be expanded by adding again 1,000 places for standing and connecting the stand to the two stands along the long sides of the pitch. The total capacity will increase to somewhere between 12,000 and 13,000.

== Belgium national football team matches ==
11 November 2020 Friendly	Belgium	2–1	Switzerland	Leuven, Belgium
20:45	Batshuayi 49', 70'	Report	Mehmedi 12'	Stadium: Den Dreef; Attendance: 0 Referee: Jérôme Brisard (France)

15 November 2020 2020–21 Nations League A	Belgium	2–0	England	Leuven, Belgium
20:45	Tielemans 10'; Mertens 23'	Report		Stadium: Den Dreef; Attendance: 0 (Note: Due to the COVID-19 pandemic in Europe, the match was played behind closed doors.); Referee: Danny Makkelie (Netherlands)

18 November 2020 2020–21 Nations League A	Belgium	4–2	Denmark	Leuven, Belgium
20:45	Tielemans 3'; Lukaku 57', 69'; De Bruyne 87'	Report	Wind 17'; Chadli 86' (o.g.)	Stadium: Den Dreef; Attendance: 0 Referee: Slavko Vinčić (Slovenia)

24 March 2021 2022 World Cup Q	Belgium	3–1	Wales	Leuven, Belgium
20:45	De Bruyne 22'; T. Hazard 28'; Lukaku 73' (pen.)	Report	Wilson 11'	Stadium: Den Dreef; Attendance: 0 Referee: Cüneyt Çakır (Turkey)

30 March 2021 2022 World Cup Q	Belgium	8–0	Belarus	Leuven, Belgium
20:45	Batshuayi 14'; Vanaken 17', 89'; Trossard 38', 75'; Doku 42'; Praet 49'; Benteke 70'	Report		Stadium: Den Dreef; Attendance: 0 Referee: Donatas Rumšas (Lithuania)

15 November 2023 Friendly	Belgium	1–0	Serbia	Leuven, Belgium
20:45	Carrasco 2'	Report		Stadium: Den Dreef; Referee: Marian Barbu (Romania)

=== Statistics ===
As of 12 March 2025

Match	P	W	D	L	GD
World Cup Qualifier	2	2	0	0	11–1
Nations League	2	2	0	0	6–2
Friendly	2	2	0	0	3–1
Total	6	6	0	0	20–4

Top-scorers: (Belgium) Michy Batshuayi & (Belgium) Romelu Lukaku (3 goals each)
