= 2022–23 Oud-Heverlee Leuven season =

Oud-Heverlee Leuven
2022–23 season
- Owner: King Power International Group
- Chairman: Aiyawatt Srivaddhanaprabha
- Manager: Marc Brys
- Stadium: Den Dreef
- Belgian First Division A: 10th
- Belgian Cup: Round of 16
- Top goalscorer: League: Mario González (13); All: Mario González (15)
Home colours	Away colours

The 2022–23 season was the 21st season in the existence of Oud-Heverlee Leuven and its third consecutive season in the top flight of Belgian football. The club just missed out on the play-offs in the domestic league, finishing in 10th place. In the Belgian Cup they were eliminated in the round of 16.

== Players ==
- This section lists players who were in Oud-Heveree Leuven's first team squad at any point during the 2022–23 season and appeared at least once on the match sheet (possibly as unused substitute)
- The symbol ℒ indicates a player who is on loan from another club
- The symbol ¥ indicates a youngster

No.	Nationality	Name	Position	Joined First Team	Previous club	Left First Team
Goalkeepers
12	(Romania)	Valentin Cojocaru	GK	21 June 2022	(Ukraine) Dnipro-1	–
29	(Belgium)	Nordin Jackers	GK	20 May 2022	(Belgium) Waasland-Beveren	–
38	(Belgium)	Oregan Ravet^{¥}	GK	Summer 2019	Youth Squad	–
Defenders
3	(Morocco) / (Spain)	Sofian Chakla	CB	27 August 2021	(Spain) Villarreal	18 January 2023
5	(Belgium) / (Democratic Republic of the Congo)	Pierre-Yves Ngawa	CB/RB	11 August 2019	(Italy) Perugia	–
6	(Belgium)	Joren Dom	RB	28 April 2022	(Belgium) Beerschot	–
14	(Uruguay) / (Italy)	Federico Ricca	CB	12 August 2022	(Belgium) Club Brugge	–
15	(Burkina Faso) / (France)	Dylan Ouédraogo	CB	28 August 2019	(Cyprus) Apollon Limassol	–
20	(Morocco) / (Ivory Coast)	Hamza Mendyl	LB / LW	5 July 2022	(Germany) Schalke 04	–
23	(Belgium) / (Democratic Republic of the Congo)	Joël Schingtienne^{¥}	CB	Summer 2022	Youth Squad	–
24	(Belgium)	Casper de Norre	LB / LW / RB / RW	5 October 2020	(Belgium) Genk	–
25	(Belgium)	Louis Patris^{¥}	CB/RB	Summer 2019	Youth Squad	–
28	(Belgium)	Ewoud Pletinckx	CB	17 June 2022	(Belgium) Zulte Waregem	–
52	(Belgium) / (Angola)	Richie Sagrado^{¥}	RB	Winter 2022–23	Youth Squad	–
Midfielders
4	(Bulgaria)	Kristiyan Malinov	DM / CM	20 August 2020	(Bulgaria) CSKA Sofia	–
7	(Iceland)	Jón Dagur Þorsteinsson	LW	4 July 2022	(Denmark) AGF	–
10	(Austria)	Raphael Holzhauser	AM	3 June 2022	(Belgium) Beerschot	11 January 2023
11	(Jordan)	Musa Al-Taamari	RW	5 October 2020	(Cyprus) APOEL	–
13	(Morocco) / (Belgium)	Sofian Kiyine	AM / LW	2 September 2022	(Italy) Lazio	–
14	(Belgium)	Thibault Vlietinck	RW	12 August 2020	(Belgium) Club Brugge	–
21	(Portugal)	João Gamboa	DM	11 July 2022	(Portugal) Estoril	30 December 2022
27	(Belgium) / (Guinea)	Mandela Keita^{¥}	CM	Winter 2020–21	Youth Squad	31 January 2023
30	(Ghana)	Emmanuel Toku	AM	30 January 2023	(Bulgaria) Botev Plovdiv	–
33	(Belgium)	Mathieu Maertens	CM / AM	12 July 2017	(Belgium) Cercle Brugge	–
42	(Belgium)	Jo Gilis^{¥}	AM	Summer 2018	Youth Squad	–
Forwards
8	(Belgium)	Siebe Schrijvers	CF / AM / RW	15 January 2021	(Belgium) Club Brugge	–
9	(Spain)	Mario González^{ℒ}	CF	24 August 2022	(Portugal) Braga	(30 June 2023)
17	(Ukraine)	Mykola Kukharevych^{ℒ}	CF	1 September 2021	(France) Troyes	2 September 2022
18	(Guinea)	Maï Traoré^{ℒ}	CF	24 January 2023	(Norway) Viking	31 March 2023
21	(Ghana)	Nathan Opoku^{ℒ}	CF	31 January 2023	(England) Leicester City	(30 June 2023)
43	(Belgium)	Nachon Nsingi^{¥}	CF	Summer 2022	Youth Squad	–
44	(Poland)	Aleksander Buksa^{ℒ}	CF	22 August 2022	(Italy) Genoa	27 January 2023
75	(Curaçao) / (Netherlands)	Joshua Zimmerman	RW	Winter 2022–23	Youth Squad	–
78	(Belgium) / (Democratic Republic of the Congo)	Franck Idumbo-Muzambo	CF	Winter 2022–23	Youth Squad	–

=== Did not appear on match sheet ===
The following players were listed as part of Oud-Heverlee Leuven's first-team squad during the 2022–23 season, but never appeared on the match sheet

No.	Nationality	Name	Position	Joined First Team	Previous club	Left First Team	Note
22	(Argentina) / (Italy)	Santiago Ramos Mingo	CB	18 July 2022	(Spain) FC Barcelona Atlètic	5 January 2023	First half of the season at OH Leuven U23, then loaned to (Argentina) Defensa y Justicia
37	(Belgium)	Milan Taildeman^{¥}	LB / RB	Summer 2022	Youth Squad	–	Played only for OH Leuven U23

== Transfers ==
=== Transfers In ===
Date Announced	Position	Nationality	Name	From	Fee	Ref.
28 April 2022	DF	(Belgium)	Joren Dom	(Belgium) Beerschot	Free	
20 May 2022	GK	(Belgium)	Nordin Jackers	(Belgium) Waasland-Beveren	Undisclosed	
3 June 2022	MF	(Austria)	Raphael Holzhauser	(Belgium) Beerschot	Free	
17 June 2022	DF	(Belgium)	Ewoud Pletinckx	(Belgium) Zulte Waregem	Undisclosed	
21 June 2022	GK	(Romania)	Valentin Cojocaru	(Ukraine) Dnipro-1	Undisclosed	
4 July 2022	MF	(Iceland)	Jón Dagur Þorsteinsson	(Denmark) AGF	Free	
5 July 2022	DF	(Morocco)	Hamza Mendyl	(Germany) Schalke 04	Undisclosed	
11 July 2022	MF	(Portugal)	João Gamboa	(Portugal) Estoril	Free	
18 July 2022	DF	(Argentina)	Santiago Ramos Mingo	(Spain) Barcelona Atlètic	Free	
20 July 2022	FW	(Ukraine)	Mykola Kukharevych	(France) Troyes	Loan	(Note: Kukharevych was already on loan from Troyes to OH Leuven during the 2021-22 season. The loan was extended with another season.)
12 August 2022	DF	(Uruguay)	Federico Ricca	(Belgium) Club Brugge	Undisclosed	
12 August 2022	MF	(Belgium)	Thibault Vlietinck	(Belgium) Club Brugge	Undisclosed	(Note: Vlietinck was already on loan from Club Brugge to OH Leuven during the 2020-21 and 2021-22 seasons. All parties agreed to make the transfer permanent.)
22 August 2022	FW	(Poland)	Aleksander Buksa	(Italy) Genoa	Loan	
24 August 2022	FW	(Spain)	Mario González	(Portugal) Braga	Loan	
2 September 2022	MF	(Morocco)	Sofian Kiyine	(Italy) Lazio	Undisclosed	
24 January 2023	FW	(Guinea)	Maï Traoré	(Norway) Viking	Loan	
30 January 2023	MF	(Ghana)	Emmanuel Toku	(Bulgaria) Botev Plovdiv	Undisclosed	
31 January 2023	FW	(Ghana)	Nathan Opoku	(England) Leicester City	Loan	

=== Transfers Out ===
Date Announced	Position	Nationality	Name	To	Fee	Ref.
19 January 2022	DF	(Belgium)	Toon Raemaekers	(Belgium) Mechelen	Free	
27 April 2022	GK	(Venezuela)	Rafael Romo	(United States) D.C. United	Undisclosed	
10 May 2022	MF	(Benin)	Yannick Aguemon	(Belgium) Virton	Free	
10 May 2022	FW	(Iran)	Kaveh Rezaei	(Iran) Tractor	Free	
2 June 2022	FW	(Belgium)	Daan Vekemans	(Belgium) Lierse Kempenzonen	Undisclosed	
7 June 2022	MF	(France)	Xavier Mercier	(Hungary) Ferencváros	Undisclosed	
17 June 2022	MF	(Morocco)	Ilyas Lefrancq	(Belgium) Mechelen	Undisclosed	
20 June 2022	FW	(Belgium)	Arthur Allemeersch	(Netherlands) TOP Oss	Undisclosed	
End of 2022–23 season	MF	(Belgium)	Alexis De Sart	(Belgium) Antwerp	Loan Return	
End of 2022–23 season	DF	(Belgium)	Sébastien Dewaest	(Belgium) Genk	Loan Return	
End of 2022–23 season	MF	(Ivory Coast)	Cedrik Gbo	(Tunisia) Espérance de Tunis	Loan Return	
End of 2022–23 season	FW	(Guinea)	Sory Kaba	(Denmark) Midtjylland	Loan Return	
End of 2022–23 season	DF	(Turkey)	Cenk Özkacar	(France) Lyon	Loan Return	
End of 2022–23 season	GK	(Iceland)	Rúnar Alex Rúnarsson	(England) Arsenal	Loan Return	
9 August 2022	GK	(Thailand)	Kawin Thamsatchanan	(Thailand) Muangthong United	Undisclosed	(Note: Thamsatchanan was out on loan from OH Leuven to Port during the second half of the 2021-22 season. The loan ended and Thamsatchanan was sold to Muangthong United.)
17 August 2022	MF	(Georgia (country))	Levan Shengelia	(Greece) Panetolikos	Undisclosed	
2 September 2022	FW	(Ukraine)	Mykola Kukharevych	(France) Troyes	Loan Terminated	
30 December 2022	MF	(Portugal)	João Gamboa	(Portugal) Estoril	Loan	
5 January 2023	DF	(Argentina)	Santiago Ramos Mingo	(Argentina) Defensa y Justicia	Loan	
11 January 2023	MF	(Austria)	Raphael Holzhauser	(Germany) 1860 Munich	Loan	
18 January 2023	DF	(Morocco)	Sofian Chakla	(Spain) Ponferradina	Free	
27 January 2023	FW	(Poland)	Aleksander Buksa	(Italy) Genoa	Loan Terminated	
31 January 2023	MF	(Belgium)	Mandela Keita	(Belgium) Antwerp	Loan	
31 March 2023	FW	(Guinea)	Maï Traoré	(Norway) Viking	Loan Terminated	

== Pre-season and friendlies ==
Win Draw Loss

14 June 2022 Friendly	OH Leuven	5–0	Kessel-Lo 2000	Oud-Heverlee, Belgium
19:00 CEST	Holzhauser (pen.); Nsingi; Maertens; Breugelmans	Report		Stadium: Banqup Academy

23 June 2022 Friendly	OH Leuven	3–1	RFC Liège	Horst, Netherlands
17:00 CEST	Nsingi 1', 37'; Ngawa 41'	Report	Mouchamps

2 July 2022 Friendly	OH Leuven	3–1	Charleroi	Oud-Heverlee, Belgium
17:30 CEST	Holzhauser 31' (pen.); Nsingi 58'; Kukharevych 90'	Report	Zaroury 53'	Stadium: Banqup Academy

6 July 2022 Friendly	OH Leuven	2–1	Beerschot	Behind closed doors
	Shengelia; Holzhauser (pen.)	Report	Sanusi	Attendance: 0

9 July 2022 Friendly	OH Leuven	1–1	Fortuna Sittard	Behind closed doors
	Holzhauser	Report	Gladon	Attendance: 0 Referee: Wesli Decremer

13 July 2022 Friendly	OH Leuven	4–2	Amiens	Oud-Heverlee, Belgium
	Thorsteinsson; Kukharevych; Al-Taamari	Report	Opoku; Chibozo	Stadium: Banqup Academy

16 July 2022 Friendly	OH Leuven	3–3	Leicester City	Leuven, Belgium
	Al-Taamari; Nsingi; Kukharevych	Report	Dewsbury-Hall; Daka; Vardy	Stadium: Den Dreef

1 December 2022 Friendly	Lyon	5–3	OH Leuven	San Pedro del Pinatar, Spain
19:30 CET (UTC+1)	Lacazette 28'; Tetê 33'; Dembélé 55', 81', 84'	Report	González 1', 45+6', 69' (pen.)	Stadium: Pinatar Arena; Attendance: 0

29 April 2023 Friendly	Feyenoord	5–3	OH Leuven	Rotterdam, Netherlands
	Giménez 8', 38'; Szymański 15'; Danilo 60'; Taabouni 73'	Report	Ouédraogo 6'; Patris 18'; Al-Taamari 33'	Stadium: Sportcomplex Varkenoord; Attendance: 0

3 May 2023 Friendly	OH Leuven	2–1	Brentford B	Leuven, Belgium
11:00 CEST (UTC+1)	Opoku; Dom	Report	Trevitt	Stadium: Den Dreef

== Competitions ==
=== Overall record ===
Competition	First match	Last match	Starting round	Final position	Record							
Competition	First match	Last match	Starting round	Final position	Pld	W	D	L	GF	GA	GD	Win %
First Division A	23 July 2022	23 April 2023	Matchday 1	10th	34	13	9	12	56	48	+8	38.24
Belgian Cup	11 August 2022	20 December 2022	Sixth round	Round of 16	2	1	0	1	6	3	+3	50.00
Total					36	14	9	13	62	51	+11	38.89

Source: Soccerway

=== Pro League ===
==== League table ====
Pos	Team	Pld	W	D	L	GF	GA	GD	Pts	Qualification or relegation
8	Cercle Brugge	34	13	11	10	50	46	+4	50	Qualification for the Play-offs II
9	Charleroi	34	14	6	14	45	52	−7	48	
10	OH Leuven	34	13	9	12	56	48	+8	48	
11	Anderlecht	34	13	7	14	49	46	+3	46	
12	Sint-Truiden	34	11	9	14	37	40	−3	42	

Source: Jupiler Pro League (in Dutch), Soccerway
Rules for classification: 1) Points; 2) Matches won; 3) Goal difference; 4) Goals scored; 5) Away matches won; 6) Away goal difference; 7) Away goals scored; 8) Play-off.

==== Results summary ====
Overall								Home						Away					
Pld	W	D	L	GF	GA	GD	Pts	W	D	L	GF	GA	GD	W	D	L	GF	GA	GD
34	13	9	12	56	48	+8	48	7	5	5	29	24	+5	6	4	7	27	24	+3

Source: Jupiler Pro League

==== Results by round ====
Round	1	2	3	4	5	6	7	8	9	10	11	12	13	14	15	16	17	18	19	20	21	22	23	24	25	26	27	28	29	30	31	32	33	34
Ground	A	H	A	H	A	H	A	H	A	H	A	H	A	A	H	A	H	A	H	A	H	A	H	A	H	A	H	H	A	H	A	H	A	H
Result	W	W	L	L	W	W	D	W	D	L	W	L	L	D	D	L	W	D	L	W	D	L	D	L	D	L	D	W	W	L	L	W	W	W
Position	2	1	4	9	7	4	4	4	4	5	5	7	7	8	8	9	8	8	9	9	9	9	10	11	11	12	13	11	10	11	11	11	11	10

Source: Jupiler Pro League
A = Away; H = Home; W = Win; D = Draw; L = Loss

==== Matches ====
2022–23 Belgian Pro League
Match Details	Home team	Result	Away team	Lineup	Unused Subs	Bookings
Regular Season
23 July 2022; 18:15; Guldensporen Stadion; Kortrijk	Kortrijk	0–2	Oud-Heverlee Leuven	Cojocaru; Pletinckx, Ouédraogo, Patris; Thorsteinsson (79' Dom), Gamboa (63' Malinov), De Norre, Al-Taamari; Maertens, Nsingi (63' Kukharevych), Holzhauser (90' Gilis)	Jackers; Chakla; Ngawa	
23 July 2022; 18:15; Guldensporen Stadion; Kortrijk		0–1; 0–2	72' Maertens (Patris); 90+3' Al-Taamari (Patris)	Cojocaru; Pletinckx, Ouédraogo, Patris; Thorsteinsson (79' Dom), Gamboa (63' Malinov), De Norre, Al-Taamari; Maertens, Nsingi (63' Kukharevych), Holzhauser (90' Gilis)	Jackers; Chakla; Ngawa	
30 July 2022; 18:15; Den Dreef; Leuven	Oud-Heverlee Leuven	2–0	Westerlo	Cojocaru; Pletinckx, Ouédraogo, Patris; Thorsteinsson (62' Dom), De Norre, Malinov, Al-Taamari; Maertens, Nsingi (90+2' Kukharevych), Holzhauser (85' Mendyl)	Jackers; Gamboa; Gilis; Ngawa	(yellow card) 48' Ouédraogo; (yellow card) 60' Patris
30 July 2022; 18:15; Den Dreef; Leuven	13' Thorsteinsson; 77' Holzhauser (pen.)	1–0; 2–0		Cojocaru; Pletinckx, Ouédraogo, Patris; Thorsteinsson (62' Dom), De Norre, Malinov, Al-Taamari; Maertens, Nsingi (90+2' Kukharevych), Holzhauser (85' Mendyl)	Jackers; Gamboa; Gilis; Ngawa	(yellow card) 48' Ouédraogo; (yellow card) 60' Patris
7 August 2022; 21:00; Bosuilstadion; Antwerp	Antwerp	4–2	Oud-Heverlee Leuven	Cojocaru; Ouédraogo (88' Ngawa), Pletinckx, Patris; Thorsteinsson (58' Dom), De Norre, Malinov (58' Mendyl), Al-Taamari; Maertens, Nsingi (68' Kukharevych), Holzhauser (88' Gamboa)	Jackers; Chakla	(yellow card) 29' Malinov
7 August 2022; 21:00; Bosuilstadion; Antwerp	38' Nainggolan (Miyoshi); 40' Frey (De Laet) 71' Balikwisha (Gerkens); 82' Balikwisha (Yusuf)	0–1; 1–1; 2–1; 2–2; 3–2; 4–2	27' Nsingi (Patris) 55' Patris (Holzhauser)	Cojocaru; Ouédraogo (88' Ngawa), Pletinckx, Patris; Thorsteinsson (58' Dom), De Norre, Malinov (58' Mendyl), Al-Taamari; Maertens, Nsingi (68' Kukharevych), Holzhauser (88' Gamboa)	Jackers; Chakla	(yellow card) 29' Malinov
14 August 2022; 18:15; Den Dreef; Leuven	Oud-Heverlee Leuven	0–3	Club Brugge	Cojocaru; Mendyl (46' Thorsteinsson), Ouédraogo, Pletinckx, Patris (84' Gamboa); De Norre, Malinov (84' Dom), Holzhauser (46' Vlietinck); Maertens, Nsingi, Al-Taamari	Jackers; Chakla; Ngawa	(yellow card) 53' Ouédraogo; (yellow card) 85' Patris; (yellow card) 86' Thorsteinsson
14 August 2022; 18:15; Den Dreef; Leuven		0–1; 0–2; 0–3	33' Nielsen; 42' Jutglà (Sowah); 53' Lang (pen.)	Cojocaru; Mendyl (46' Thorsteinsson), Ouédraogo, Pletinckx, Patris (84' Gamboa); De Norre, Malinov (84' Dom), Holzhauser (46' Vlietinck); Maertens, Nsingi, Al-Taamari	Jackers; Chakla; Ngawa	(yellow card) 53' Ouédraogo; (yellow card) 85' Patris; (yellow card) 86' Thorsteinsson
21 August 2022; 18:30; Stade Maurice Dufrasne; Liège	Standard Liège	1–3	Oud-Heverlee Leuven	Cojocaru; Mendyl (58' Ouédraogo), Ricca, Pletinckx, Patris; De Norre, Maertens (90' Dom), Malinov (71' Gamboa); Thorsteinsson (58' Vlietinck), Nsingi, Al-Taamari	Jackers; Holzhauser; Ngawa	(yellow card) 15' Mendyl; (yellow card) 36' Thorsteinsson; (yellow card) 42' Malinov; (yellow card) 43' Al-Taamari; (red card) 51' Mendyl
21 August 2022; 18:30; Stade Maurice Dufrasne; Liège	90+1' Emond	0–1; 0–2; 0–3; 1–3	35' Thorsteinsson (Maertens); 45' Nsingi (Patris); 75' Al-Taamari	Cojocaru; Mendyl (58' Ouédraogo), Ricca, Pletinckx, Patris; De Norre, Maertens (90' Dom), Malinov (71' Gamboa); Thorsteinsson (58' Vlietinck), Nsingi, Al-Taamari	Jackers; Holzhauser; Ngawa	(yellow card) 15' Mendyl; (yellow card) 36' Thorsteinsson; (yellow card) 42' Malinov; (yellow card) 43' Al-Taamari; (red card) 51' Mendyl
27 August 2022; 18:15; Den Dreef; Leuven	Oud-Heverlee Leuven	2–1	Oostende	Cojocaru; Mendyl (66' Ouédraogo), Ricca (88' Kukharevych), Pletinckx, Patris; De Norre, Maertens, Malinov (81' Dom); Thorsteinsson (81' Holzhauser), González, Al-Taamari	Jackers; Gamboa; Ngawa	(yellow card) 18' Al-Taamari
27 August 2022; 18:15; Den Dreef; Leuven	51' González (Patris); 90' Maertens (Holzhauser)	0–1; 1–1; 2–1	5' Hornby	Cojocaru; Mendyl (66' Ouédraogo), Ricca (88' Kukharevych), Pletinckx, Patris; De Norre, Maertens, Malinov (81' Dom); Thorsteinsson (81' Holzhauser), González, Al-Taamari	Jackers; Gamboa; Ngawa	(yellow card) 18' Al-Taamari
4 September 2022; 13:30; Constant Vanden Stock Stadium; Anderlecht	Anderlecht	2–2	Oud-Heverlee Leuven	Cojocaru; Mendyl, Ouédraogo, Pletinckx, Patris; Thorsteinsson (81' Vlietinck), De Norre, Maertens, Malinov (73' Dom), Al-Taamari; González (73' Holzhauser)	Jackers; Buksa; Gamboa; Ngawa	(yellow card) 54' Malinov
4 September 2022; 13:30; Constant Vanden Stock Stadium; Anderlecht	71' Duranville (Ashimeru) 85' Silva	0–1; 1–1; 1–2; 2–2	19' Thorsteinsson (Al-Taamari) 74' Al-Taamari (Maertens)	Cojocaru; Mendyl, Ouédraogo, Pletinckx, Patris; Thorsteinsson (81' Vlietinck), De Norre, Maertens, Malinov (73' Dom), Al-Taamari; González (73' Holzhauser)	Jackers; Buksa; Gamboa; Ngawa	(yellow card) 54' Malinov
10 September 2022; 18:45; Den Dreef; Leuven	Oud-Heverlee Leuven	3–2	Charleroi	Cojocaru; Mendyl (74' Ouédraogo), Ricca, Pletinckx, Patris; Thorsteinsson (61' Holzhauser), De Norre, Maertens, Malinov, Al-Taamari (90+1' Dom); Nsingi (61' González)	Jackers; Gamboa; Kiyine	(yellow card) 76' Mendyl; (yellow card) 88' Holzhauser
10 September 2022; 18:45; Den Dreef; Leuven	22' Maertens (Malinov); 62' González (Holzhauser) 85' González (Ouédraogo)	0–1; 1–1; 2–1; 2–2; 3–2	13' Heymans (Gholizadeh) 76' Ilaimaharitra (Heymans)	Cojocaru; Mendyl (74' Ouédraogo), Ricca, Pletinckx, Patris; Thorsteinsson (61' Holzhauser), De Norre, Maertens, Malinov, Al-Taamari (90+1' Dom); Nsingi (61' González)	Jackers; Gamboa; Kiyine	(yellow card) 76' Mendyl; (yellow card) 88' Holzhauser
17 September 2022; 16:00; Achter de Kazerne; Mechelen	Mechelen	0–0	Oud-Heverlee Leuven	Cojocaru; Mendyl (84' Nsingi), Ricca, Pletinckx, Patris (84' Dom); Thorsteinsson (66' Holzhauser), Malinov, Maertens, De Norre, Al-Taamari; González	Jackers; Gamboa; Ngawa; Ouédraogo	(yellow card) 70' Maertens; (yellow card) 87' Dom
1 October 2022; 16:00; Den Dreef; Leuven	Oud-Heverlee Leuven	0–3	Union SG	Cojocaru; Mendyl (64' Kiyine), Ricca, Pletinckx, Patris; Thorsteinsson (46' Holzhauser), De Norre, Maertens, Malinov (64' Nsingi), Al-Taamari; González (74' Ngawa)	Jackers; Keita; Ouédraogo	(yellow card) 22' Mendyl; (yellow card) 90' Maertens
1 October 2022; 16:00; Den Dreef; Leuven		0–1; 0–2; 0–3	12' Burgess (Teuma); 20' Kandouss; 68' Vanzeir (Adingra)	Cojocaru; Mendyl (64' Kiyine), Ricca, Pletinckx, Patris; Thorsteinsson (46' Holzhauser), De Norre, Maertens, Malinov (64' Nsingi), Al-Taamari; González (74' Ngawa)	Jackers; Keita; Ouédraogo	(yellow card) 22' Mendyl; (yellow card) 90' Maertens
8 October 2022; 16:15; Elindus Arena; Waregem	Zulte Waregem	2–5	Oud-Heverlee Leuven	Cojocaru; Mendyl (89' Ouédraogo), Ricca, Pletinckx, Patris (90+4' Ngawa); Thorsteinsson (46' Kiyine), De Norre, Maertens, Malinov (84' Keita), Al-Taamari; Nsingi (46' González)	Jackers; Holzhauser	(yellow card) 30' Nsingi; (yellow card) 80' Malinov
8 October 2022; 16:15; Elindus Arena; Waregem	40' Vossen (Ndour) 74' De Norre (o.g.)	1–0; 1–1; 1–2; 1–3; 2–3; 2–4; 2–5	51' González (De Norre); 58' Kiyine; 65' González (Mendyl) 77' De Norre (González); 90+1' González (Kiyine)	Cojocaru; Mendyl (89' Ouédraogo), Ricca, Pletinckx, Patris (90+4' Ngawa); Thorsteinsson (46' Kiyine), De Norre, Maertens, Malinov (84' Keita), Al-Taamari; Nsingi (46' González)	Jackers; Holzhauser	(yellow card) 30' Nsingi; (yellow card) 80' Malinov
15 October 2022; 20:45; Den Dreef; Leuven	Oud-Heverlee Leuven	0–1	Genk	Cojocaru; Mendyl (87' Ouédraogo), Ricca, Pletinckx, Dom (87' Patris); Malinov, Maertens, De Norre; Thorsteinsson (46' Al-Taamari), González, Kiyine (72' Holzhauser)	Jackers; Keita; Nsingi	(yellow card) 34' Maertens; (yellow card) 43' Thorsteinsson; (yellow card) 77' Ricca
15 October 2022; 20:45; Den Dreef; Leuven		0–1	16' Onuachu (Trésor)	Cojocaru; Mendyl (87' Ouédraogo), Ricca, Pletinckx, Dom (87' Patris); Malinov, Maertens, De Norre; Thorsteinsson (46' Al-Taamari), González, Kiyine (72' Holzhauser)	Jackers; Keita; Nsingi	(yellow card) 34' Maertens; (yellow card) 43' Thorsteinsson; (yellow card) 77' Ricca
18 October 2022; 18:30; Kehrwegstadion; Eupen	Eupen	4–2	Oud-Heverlee Leuven	Cojocaru; Mendyl, Ricca, Pletinckx, Patris (46' Dom); Kiyine (69' Keita), De Norre (78' Nsingi), Maertens, Malinov, Al-Taamari; González	Jackers; Holzhauser; Ngawa; Ouédraogo	(yellow card) 13' Patris; (yellow card) 90+1' Mendyl
18 October 2022; 18:30; Kehrwegstadion; Eupen	24' Charles-Cook (N'Dri) 45+3' Peeters (pen.); 75' Magnée (Král); 86' N'Dri (Peeters)	0–1; 1–1; 1–2; 2–2; 3–2; 4–2	8' González (Kiyine) 27' González (pen.)	Cojocaru; Mendyl, Ricca, Pletinckx, Patris (46' Dom); Kiyine (69' Keita), De Norre (78' Nsingi), Maertens, Malinov, Al-Taamari; González	Jackers; Holzhauser; Ngawa; Ouédraogo	(yellow card) 13' Patris; (yellow card) 90+1' Mendyl
22 October 2022; 18:15; Stayen; Sint-Truiden	Sint-Truiden	0–0	Oud-Heverlee Leuven	Cojocaru; Mendyl, Ricca, Pletinckx (22' Patris), Dom; Kiyine (65' Holzhauser), De Norre, Maertens, Malinov (77' Keita), Al-Taamari; González (77' Nsingi)	Jackers; Ouédraogo; Thorsteinsson	(yellow card) 60' Kiyine; (yellow card) 76' Patris
30 October 2022; 18:30; Den Dreef; Leuven	Oud-Heverlee Leuven	1–1	Gent	Cojocaru; Mendyl, Ouédraogo, Ricca, Patris; Kiyine (62' Thorsteinsson), Malinov (85' Keita), Maertens, De Norre, Al-Taamari; González (85' Nsingi)	Ravet; Dom; Ngawa; Vlietinck	(yellow card) 55' Malinov; (yellow card) 80' Maertens; (yellow card) 81' De Norre; (yellow card) 88' Keita; (yellow card) 90+4' Mendyl
30 October 2022; 18:30; Den Dreef; Leuven	73' González (Patris)	0–1; 1–1	42' Cuypers	Cojocaru; Mendyl, Ouédraogo, Ricca, Patris; Kiyine (62' Thorsteinsson), Malinov (85' Keita), Maertens, De Norre, Al-Taamari; González (85' Nsingi)	Ravet; Dom; Ngawa; Vlietinck	(yellow card) 55' Malinov; (yellow card) 80' Maertens; (yellow card) 81' De Norre; (yellow card) 88' Keita; (yellow card) 90+4' Mendyl
5 November 2022; 18:15; Jan Breydel Stadium; Bruges	Cercle Brugge	2–1	Oud-Heverlee Leuven	Cojocaru; Ricca, Ouédraogo (42' Keita), Patris; Kiyine (65' Vlietinck), Dom, De Norre, Al-Taamari; Maertens, González, Holzhauser (62' Thorsteinsson)	Ravet; Ngawa; Nsingi; Schingtienne	(yellow card) 57' Ricca; (yellow card) 68' Thorsteinsson
5 November 2022; 18:15; Jan Breydel Stadium; Bruges	36' Ueda (Somers) 90+4' Ravych	1–0; 1–1; 2–1	41' González (De Norre)	Cojocaru; Ricca, Ouédraogo (42' Keita), Patris; Kiyine (65' Vlietinck), Dom, De Norre, Al-Taamari; Maertens, González, Holzhauser (62' Thorsteinsson)	Ravet; Ngawa; Nsingi; Schingtienne	(yellow card) 57' Ricca; (yellow card) 68' Thorsteinsson
11 November 2022; 20:45; Den Dreef; Leuven	Oud-Heverlee Leuven	5–0	Seraing	Cojocaru; Mendyl, Ricca, Pletinckx, Patris (80' Dom); Kiyine (46' Nsingi), Malinov (66' Keita), Maertens, De Norre, Al-Taamari (80' Vlietinck); González (80' Thorsteinsson)	Ravet; Ngawa	(yellow card) 60' Nsingi
11 November 2022; 20:45; Den Dreef; Leuven	23' Maertens (De Norre); 29' González (Ricca); 42' De Norre; 45+2' Kiyine (pen.); 89' Nsingi (Mendyl)	1–0; 2–0; 3–0; 4–0; 5–0		Cojocaru; Mendyl, Ricca, Pletinckx, Patris (80' Dom); Kiyine (46' Nsingi), Malinov (66' Keita), Maertens, De Norre, Al-Taamari (80' Vlietinck); González (80' Thorsteinsson)	Ravet; Ngawa	(yellow card) 60' Nsingi
26 December 2022; 13:30; Jan Breydel Stadium; Bruges	Club Brugge	1–1	Oud-Heverlee Leuven	Cojocaru; Mendyl, Ricca, Pletinckx, Patris (82' Dom); Thorsteinsson (46' Al-Taamari), Malinov (70' Nsingi), Maertens (89' Holzhauser), De Norre, Kiyine (82' Schrijvers); González	Jackers; Keita	(yellow card) 16' Thorsteinsson; (yellow card) 24' Malinov
26 December 2022; 13:30; Jan Breydel Stadium; Bruges	43' Jutglà (pen.)	1–0; 1–1	90+4' Nsingi	Cojocaru; Mendyl, Ricca, Pletinckx, Patris (82' Dom); Thorsteinsson (46' Al-Taamari), Malinov (70' Nsingi), Maertens (89' Holzhauser), De Norre, Kiyine (82' Schrijvers); González	Jackers; Keita	(yellow card) 16' Thorsteinsson; (yellow card) 24' Malinov
8 January 2023; 21:00; Den Dreef; Leuven	Oud-Heverlee Leuven	2–3	Kortrijk	Cojocaru; Pletinckx, Ricca, Patris; Kiyine (69' Nsingi), Keita (69' Dom), De Norre, Al-Taamari; Maertens (31' Schrijvers), González, Holzhauser	Jackers; Malinov; Ouédraogo; Vlietinck	(yellow card) 78' Ricca
8 January 2023; 21:00; Den Dreef; Leuven	9' Al-Taamari (Patris) 76' Patris (Holzhauser)	1–0; 1–1; 1–2; 2–2; 2–3	43' Avenatti (Sych); 51' Sych (Selemani) 90+2' Avenatti (Lončar)	Cojocaru; Pletinckx, Ricca, Patris; Kiyine (69' Nsingi), Keita (69' Dom), De Norre, Al-Taamari; Maertens (31' Schrijvers), González, Holzhauser	Jackers; Malinov; Ouédraogo; Vlietinck	(yellow card) 78' Ricca
13 January 2023; 20:45; Het Kuipje; Westerlo	Westerlo	1–2	Oud-Heverlee Leuven	Cojocaru; Mendyl, Ricca, Pletinckx, Patris; Keita (46' Kiyine), Schrijvers (83' Malinov), De Norre; Thorsteinsson (88' Dom), González, Al-Taamari (90+4' Vlietinck)	Jackers; Nsingi; Schingtienne	(yellow card) 36' Al-Taamari; (yellow card) 77' Schrijvers; (red card) 84' Mendyl
13 January 2023; 20:45; Het Kuipje; Westerlo	79' Dorgeles Nene (Vetokele)	0–1; 0–2; 1–2	51' González (Mendyl); 56' González (pen.)	Cojocaru; Mendyl, Ricca, Pletinckx, Patris; Keita (46' Kiyine), Schrijvers (83' Malinov), De Norre; Thorsteinsson (88' Dom), González, Al-Taamari (90+4' Vlietinck)	Jackers; Nsingi; Schingtienne	(yellow card) 36' Al-Taamari; (yellow card) 77' Schrijvers; (red card) 84' Mendyl
17 January 2023; 18:30; Den Dreef; Leuven	Oud-Heverlee Leuven	1–1	Eupen	Cojocaru; Mendyl (71' Ouédraogo), Ricca, Pletinckx, Patris; Schrijvers (84' Dom), Kiyine (71' Malinov), De Norre; Thorsteinsson (84' Vlietinck), Nsingi, Al-Taamari	Jackers; Keita; Schingtienne	(yellow card) 45+1' Kiyine; (yellow card) 59' Mendyl
17 January 2023; 18:30; Den Dreef; Leuven	28' Thorsteinsson	1–0; 1–1	90+2' Prevljak (pen.)	Cojocaru; Mendyl (71' Ouédraogo), Ricca, Pletinckx, Patris; Schrijvers (84' Dom), Kiyine (71' Malinov), De Norre; Thorsteinsson (84' Vlietinck), Nsingi, Al-Taamari	Jackers; Keita; Schingtienne	(yellow card) 45+1' Kiyine; (yellow card) 59' Mendyl
21 January 2023; 20:45; Joseph Marien Stadium; Forest	Union SG	1–0	Oud-Heverlee Leuven	Cojocaru; Pletinckx, Ricca, Ouédraogo; Vlietinck (81' Kiyine), Dom, De Norre, Patris; Thorsteinsson, Nsingi, Schrijvers (81' Al-Taamari)	Jackers; Keita; Malinov; Sagrado; Schingtienne	(yellow card) 25' Thorsteinsson; (yellow card) 34' Schrijvers; (yellow card) 69' Ricca
21 January 2023; 20:45; Joseph Marien Stadium; Forest	77' Nilsson (Adingra)	1–0		Cojocaru; Pletinckx, Ricca, Ouédraogo; Vlietinck (81' Kiyine), Dom, De Norre, Patris; Thorsteinsson, Nsingi, Schrijvers (81' Al-Taamari)	Jackers; Keita; Malinov; Sagrado; Schingtienne	(yellow card) 25' Thorsteinsson; (yellow card) 34' Schrijvers; (yellow card) 69' Ricca
28 January 2023; 18:15; Den Dreef; Leuven	Oud-Heverlee Leuven	1–1	Sint-Truiden	Cojocaru; Ouédraogo (84' Vlietinck), Ricca, Pletinckx, Patris; Al-Taamari, Dom, Thorsteinsson, De Norre, Schrijvers (68' Kiyine); Nsingi (68' González)	Jackers; Keita; Malinov; Ngawa	
28 January 2023; 18:15; Den Dreef; Leuven	53' Thorsteinsson (Schrijvers)	0–1; 1–1	9' Hayashi (Hashioka)	Cojocaru; Ouédraogo (84' Vlietinck), Ricca, Pletinckx, Patris; Al-Taamari, Dom, Thorsteinsson, De Norre, Schrijvers (68' Kiyine); Nsingi (68' González)	Jackers; Keita; Malinov; Ngawa	
4 February 2023; 18:15; Stade du Pairay; Seraing	Seraing	2–1	Oud-Heverlee Leuven	Cojocaru; Dom (79' Ouédraogo), Ricca, Pletinckx, Patris; Thorsteinsson, Schrijvers (79' Nsingi), Kiyine (63' Vlietinck), De Norre, Al-Taamari (89' Traoré); González	Jackers; Malinov; Ngawa	
4 February 2023; 18:15; Stade du Pairay; Seraing	5' Poaty (Tshibuabua) 85' Lepoint (Sissoko)	1–0; 1–1; 2–1	37' Ricca (Schrijvers)	Cojocaru; Dom (79' Ouédraogo), Ricca, Pletinckx, Patris; Thorsteinsson, Schrijvers (79' Nsingi), Kiyine (63' Vlietinck), De Norre, Al-Taamari (89' Traoré); González	Jackers; Malinov; Ngawa	
10 February 2023; 20:00; Den Dreef; Leuven	Oud-Heverlee Leuven	0–0	Cercle Brugge	Cojocaru; Mendyl (70' Al-Taamari), Pletinckx, Ricca, Ouédraogo, Patris; De Norre, Thorsteinsson, Schrijvers (90' Dom); González, Nsingi	Jackers; Kiyine; Malinov; Ngawa; Vlietinck	(yellow card) 43' Ricca
19 February 2023; 16:00; Ghelamco Arena; Ghent	Gent	2–0	Oud-Heverlee Leuven	Cojocaru; Mendyl, Ouédraogo, Pletinckx, Patris; Dom, Schrijvers (68' Toku), De Norre; Thorsteinsson (79' Nsingi), González, Al-Taamari (79' Kiyine)	Jackers; Malinov; Schingtienne; Vlietinck	(yellow card) 47' Mendyl
19 February 2023; 16:00; Ghelamco Arena; Ghent	49' Cuypers (Hong); 73' Kums (Cuypers)	1–0; 2–0		Cojocaru; Mendyl, Ouédraogo, Pletinckx, Patris; Dom, Schrijvers (68' Toku), De Norre; Thorsteinsson (79' Nsingi), González, Al-Taamari (79' Kiyine)	Jackers; Malinov; Schingtienne; Vlietinck	(yellow card) 47' Mendyl
26 February 2023; 16:00; Den Dreef; Leuven	Oud-Heverlee Leuven	1–1	Antwerp	Cojocaru; Mendyl, Ricca, Pletinckx, Patris; Dom (83' Kiyine), Schrijvers, De Norre; Thorsteinsson, Nsingi (83' Opoku), Al-Taamari	Ravet; Malinov; Ngawa; Ouédraogo; Vlietinck	(yellow card) 89' Thorsteinsson
26 February 2023; 16:00; Den Dreef; Leuven	34' Thorsteinsson (pen.)	1–0; 1–1	60' Kerk	Cojocaru; Mendyl, Ricca, Pletinckx, Patris; Dom (83' Kiyine), Schrijvers, De Norre; Thorsteinsson, Nsingi (83' Opoku), Al-Taamari	Ravet; Malinov; Ngawa; Ouédraogo; Vlietinck	(yellow card) 89' Thorsteinsson
4 March 2023; 18:15; Den Dreef; Leuven	Oud-Heverlee Leuven	4–2	Zulte Waregem	Cojocaru; Mendyl, Ricca, Pletinckx, Patris; Dom, Schrijvers (53' Kiyine), De Norre; Thorsteinsson (80' Opoku), Nsingi (64' Vlietinck), Al-Taamari (80' Malinov)	Jackers; Ngawa; Ouédraogo	(yellow card) 46' Patris; (yellow card) 71' Ricca
4 March 2023; 18:15; Den Dreef; Leuven	29' Schrijvers; 41' Thorsteinsson (Nsingi); 45' De Norre (Thorsteinsson) 76' Thorsteinsson (pen.)	1–0; 2–0; 3–0; 3–1; 4–1; 4–2	73' Vossen (pen.) 82' Gano (Ndour)	Cojocaru; Mendyl, Ricca, Pletinckx, Patris; Dom, Schrijvers (53' Kiyine), De Norre; Thorsteinsson (80' Opoku), Nsingi (64' Vlietinck), Al-Taamari (80' Malinov)	Jackers; Ngawa; Ouédraogo	(yellow card) 46' Patris; (yellow card) 71' Ricca
10 March 2023; 20:45; Stade du Pays de Charleroi; Charleroi	Charleroi	0–1	Oud-Heverlee Leuven	Cojocaru; Ricca, Ouédraogo, Pletinckx; Mendyl (74' Vlietinck), De Norre, Dom, Al-Taamari (87' Sagrado); Opoku (74' González), Kiyine (90+3' Ngawa), Thorsteinsson (87' Malinov)	Jackers; Zimmerman	(yellow card) 47' Ouédraogo; (yellow card) 77' Cojocaru; (yellow card) 85' Kiyine; (yellow card) 90+5' Malinov
10 March 2023; 20:45; Stade du Pays de Charleroi; Charleroi		0–1	16' Al-Taamari (De Norre)	Cojocaru; Ricca, Ouédraogo, Pletinckx; Mendyl (74' Vlietinck), De Norre, Dom, Al-Taamari (87' Sagrado); Opoku (74' González), Kiyine (90+3' Ngawa), Thorsteinsson (87' Malinov)	Jackers; Zimmerman	(yellow card) 47' Ouédraogo; (yellow card) 77' Cojocaru; (yellow card) 85' Kiyine; (yellow card) 90+5' Malinov
19 March 2023; 16:00; Den Dreef; Leuven	Oud-Heverlee Leuven	0–2	Anderlecht	Cojocaru; Dom (70' Maertens), Ricca, Pletinckx, Patris; Kiyine (78' Vlietinck), Thorsteinsson, De Norre; Mendyl (70' Schrijvers), González (78' Opoku), Al-Taamari	Jackers; Malinov; Ngawa	(yellow card) 32' Mendyl; (yellow card) 62' Al-Taamari; (yellow card) 81' Schrijvers
19 March 2023; 16:00; Den Dreef; Leuven		0–1; 0–2	33' Slimani (pen.); 90' Arnstad (Raman)	Cojocaru; Dom (70' Maertens), Ricca, Pletinckx, Patris; Kiyine (78' Vlietinck), Thorsteinsson, De Norre; Mendyl (70' Schrijvers), González (78' Opoku), Al-Taamari	Jackers; Malinov; Ngawa	(yellow card) 32' Mendyl; (yellow card) 62' Al-Taamari; (yellow card) 81' Schrijvers
2 April 2023; 13:30; Cegeka Arena; Genk	Genk	2–1	Oud-Heverlee Leuven	Cojocaru; Mendyl, Ricca, Pletinckx, Patris; De Norre, Maertens (81' Dom), Schrijvers (88' Ouédraogo); Thorsteinsson, González (76' Vlietinck), Al-Taamari	Jackers; Malinov; Opoku; Schingtienne	(yellow card) 41' Thorsteinsson; (yellow card) 61' Ricca
2 April 2023; 13:30; Cegeka Arena; Genk	23' Heynen 87' Trésor	1–0; 1–1; 2–1	56' Thorsteinsson (pen.)	Cojocaru; Mendyl, Ricca, Pletinckx, Patris; De Norre, Maertens (81' Dom), Schrijvers (88' Ouédraogo); Thorsteinsson, González (76' Vlietinck), Al-Taamari	Jackers; Malinov; Opoku; Schingtienne	(yellow card) 41' Thorsteinsson; (yellow card) 61' Ricca
8 April 2023; 16:00; Den Dreef; Leuven	Oud-Heverlee Leuven	4–1	Mechelen	Cojocaru; Sagrado (70' Mendyl), Ricca, Pletinckx, Patris; De Norre, Maertens, Schrijvers (76' Dom); Thorsteinsson (70' Toku), Opoku (70' Idumbo-Muzambo), Al-Taamari (85' Vlietinck)	Jackers; Schingtienne	(yellow card) 81' Ricca
8 April 2023; 16:00; Den Dreef; Leuven	4' De Norre; 39' Opoku; 56' Maertens (Thorsteinsson); 60' Al-Taamari (Opoku)	1–0; 2–0; 3–0; 4–0; 4–1	89' Hairemans (Vanlerberghe)	Cojocaru; Sagrado (70' Mendyl), Ricca, Pletinckx, Patris; De Norre, Maertens, Schrijvers (76' Dom); Thorsteinsson (70' Toku), Opoku (70' Idumbo-Muzambo), Al-Taamari (85' Vlietinck)	Jackers; Schingtienne	(yellow card) 81' Ricca
15 April 2023; 18:15; Diaz Arena; Ostend	Oostende	0–4	Oud-Heverlee Leuven	Cojocaru; Mendyl (87' Ouédraogo), Ricca, Pletinckx, Patris; De Norre, Maertens (90+1' Schingtienne), Schrijvers (70' Dom); Thorsteinsson, Opoku (70' Nsingi), Al-Taamari (87' Vlietinck)	Jackers; Idumbo-Muzambo	
15 April 2023; 18:15; Diaz Arena; Ostend		0–1; 0–2; 0–3; 0–4	22' Schrijvers (Mendyl); 44' Opoku (Pletinckx); 58' Thorsteinsson (Al-Taamari); 88' Nsingi (Thorsteinsson)	Cojocaru; Mendyl (87' Ouédraogo), Ricca, Pletinckx, Patris; De Norre, Maertens (90+1' Schingtienne), Schrijvers (70' Dom); Thorsteinsson, Opoku (70' Nsingi), Al-Taamari (87' Vlietinck)	Jackers; Idumbo-Muzambo	
23 April 2023; 18:30; Den Dreef; Leuven	Oud-Heverlee Leuven	3–2	Standard Liège	Cojocaru; Mendyl (88' Sagrado), Ricca, Pletinckx, Patris; De Norre, Maertens, Schrijvers (90+3' Dom); Thorsteinsson (90' Toku), Opoku (90+3' Nsingi), Al-Taamari (90+3' Vlietinck)	Jackers; Ngawa	
23 April 2023; 18:30; Den Dreef; Leuven	43' Opoku (Maertens) 63' Thorsteinsson (pen.); 67' Thorsteinsson (Maertens)	1–0; 1–1; 2–1; 3–1; 3–2	55' Bokadi (Alzate) 90+1' Melegoni	Cojocaru; Mendyl (88' Sagrado), Ricca, Pletinckx, Patris; De Norre, Maertens, Schrijvers (90+3' Dom); Thorsteinsson (90' Toku), Opoku (90+3' Nsingi), Al-Taamari (90+3' Vlietinck)	Jackers; Ngawa	

=== Belgian Cup ===
==== Results ====
2022–23 Belgian Cup
Match Details	Home team	Result	Away team	Lineup	Unused Subs	Bookings
6th Round
11 August 2022; 20:30; Stade Robert Urbain; Boussu	Francs Borains	0–5	Oud-Heverlee Leuven	Cojocaru; Mendyl, Ricca, Dom, Patris (73' Ngawa); Malinov, De Norre (73' Keita), Maertens (73' Kiyine); Thorsteinsson (46' Vlietinck), González (73' Nsingi), Al-Taamari	Ravet; Holzhauser	
11 August 2022; 20:30; Stade Robert Urbain; Boussu		0–1; 0–2; 0–3; 0–4; 0–5	18' Maertens (Mendyl); 45' De Norre (Al-Taamari); 47' González (Mendyl); 61' Mpati (o.g.); 69' Vlietinck (Al-Taamari)	Cojocaru; Mendyl, Ricca, Dom, Patris (73' Ngawa); Malinov, De Norre (73' Keita), Maertens (73' Kiyine); Thorsteinsson (46' Vlietinck), González (73' Nsingi), Al-Taamari	Ravet; Holzhauser	
Round of 16
20 December 2022; 20:00; Den Dreef; Leuven	Oud-Heverlee Leuven	1–3	Kortrijk	Cojocaru; Mendyl, Ricca, Pletinckx, Patris; Vlietinck (65' Thorsteinsson), Keita (65' Schrijvers), Maertens, De Norre (80' Holzhauser), Al-Taamari; González	Jackers; Dom; Kiyine; Nsingi	(yellow card) 51' Patris; (red card) 72' Mendyl; (yellow card) 72' Schrijvers; (yellow card) 78' Ricca
20 December 2022; 20:00; Den Dreef; Leuven	90+2' González (Thorsteinsson)	0–1; 0–2; 0–3; 1–3	55' Bruno (Selemani); 81' Keïta (Selemani); 86' Avenatti	Cojocaru; Mendyl, Ricca, Pletinckx, Patris; Vlietinck (65' Thorsteinsson), Keita (65' Schrijvers), Maertens, De Norre (80' Holzhauser), Al-Taamari; González	Jackers; Dom; Kiyine; Nsingi	(yellow card) 51' Patris; (red card) 72' Mendyl; (yellow card) 72' Schrijvers; (yellow card) 78' Ricca

== Statistics ==
=== Appearances and goals ===
No.	Pos	Nat	Player	Total		Pro League		Belgian Cup	
No.	Pos	Nat	Player	Apps	Goals	Apps	Goals	Apps	Goals
Goalkeepers
12	GK	(Romania) ROU	Valentin Cojocaru	36	0	34	0	2	0
29	GK	(Belgium) BEL	Nordin Jackers	0	0	0	0	0	0
38	GK	(Belgium) BEL	Oregan Ravet	0	0	0	0	0	0
Defenders
5	DF	(Belgium) BEL	Pierre-Yves Ngawa	5	0	0+4	0	0+1	0
6	DF	(Belgium) BEL	Joren Dom	32	0	11+20	0	1	0
14	DF	(Uruguay) URU	Federico Ricca	30	1	28	1	2	0
15	DF	(Burkina Faso) BFA	Dylan Ouédraogo	21	0	12+9	0	0	0
20	DF	(Morocco) MAR	Hamza Mendyl	30	0	25+3	0	2	0
23	DF	(Belgium) BEL	Joël Schingtienne	1	0	0+1	0	0	0
24	DF	(Belgium) BEL	Casper de Norre	36	5	34	4	2	1
25	DF	(Belgium) BEL	Louis Patris	35	2	31+2	2	2	0
28	DF	(Belgium) BEL	Ewoud Pletinckx	33	0	32	0	1	0
52	DF	(Belgium) BEL	Richie Sagrado	3	0	1+2	0	0	0
Midfielders
4	MF	(Bulgaria) BUL	Kristiyan Malinov	22	0	16+5	0	1	0
7	MF	(Iceland) ISL	Jón Dagur Þorsteinsson	33	12	27+4	12	1+1	0
8	MF	(Belgium) BEL	Siebe Schrijvers	17	2	13+3	2	0+1	0
13	MF	(Morocco) MAR	Sofian Kiyine	21	2	12+8	2	0+1	0
30	MF	(Ghana) GHA	Emmanuel Toku	3	0	0+3	0	0	0
33	MF	(Belgium) BEL	Mathieu Maertens	26	6	23+1	5	2	1
42	MF	(Belgium) BEL	Jo Gilis	1	0	0+1	0	0	0
77	MF	(Belgium) BEL	Thibault Vlietinck	19	1	1+16	0	1+1	1
Forwards
9	FW	(Spain) ESP	Mario González	24	15	18+4	13	2	2
21	FW	(Ghana) GHA	Nathan Opoku	7	3	4+3	3	0	0
43	FW	(Belgium) BEL	Nachon Nsingi	26	5	13+12	5	0+1	0
78	FW	(Belgium) BEL	Franck Idumbo-Muzambo	1	0	0+1	0	0	0
Players transferred out during the season
10	MF	(Austria) AUT	Raphael Holzhauser	15	1	6+8	1	0+1	0
27	MF	(Belgium) BEL	Mandela Keita	10	0	2+6	0	1+1	0
11	FW	(Jordan) JOR	Musa Al-Taamari	36	6	30+4	6	2	0

Last updated: 23 April 2023
Source: Competitions
