= 2020–21 Oud-Heverlee Leuven season =

Oud-Heverlee Leuven
2020–21 season
- Owner: King Power International Group
- Chairman: Aiyawatt Srivaddhanaprabha
- Manager: Marc Brys
- Stadium: Den Dreef
- Belgian First Division A: 11th
- Belgian Cup: Sixth round
- Top goalscorer: League: Thomas Henry (21); All: Thomas Henry (21)
| Home colours | Away colours | Third colours |
- All statistics correct as of 18 April 2021.

The 2020–21 Oud-Heverlee Leuven season was the club's 19th season in existence and its first season back in the top flight of Belgian football. In addition to the domestic league, OH Leuven participated in this season's edition of the Belgian Cup. The season covered the period from 3 August 2020 to 30 June 2021, but in reality OH Leuven's season de facto ended already mid-April upon completion of the regular season, with OH Leuven not qualified for any of the playoffs.

== Players ==
- This section lists players who were in Oud-Heveree Leuven's first team squad at any point during the 2020–21 season and appeared at least once on the match sheet (possibly as unused substitute)
- The symbol ℒ indicates a player who is on loan from another club
- The symbol ¥ indicates a youngster

| No. | Nationality | Name | Position | Joined First Team | Previous club | Left First Team |
Goalkeepers
| 1 | (Thailand) | Kawin Thamsatchanan | GK | 10 January 2018 | (Thailand) Muangthong United | – |
| 16 | (South Africa) | Darren Keet | GK | 31 July 2019 | (South Africa) Bidvest Wits | 29 October 2020 |
| 21 | (Denmark) | Daniel Iversen^{ℒ} | GK | 11 August 2020 | (England) Leicester City | 7 January 2021 |
| 38 | (Belgium) | Oregan Ravet^{¥} | GK | Summer 2019 | Youth Squad | – |
| 90 | (Venezuela) / (Spain) | Rafael Romo | GK | 19 August 2020 | (Denmark) Silkeborg | – |
Defenders
| 2 | (Czech Republic) | Václav Jemelka^{ℒ} | CB | 5 October 2020 | (Czech Republic) Sigma Olomouc | (30 June 2021) |
| 3 | (Belgium) / (Democratic Republic of the Congo) | Derrick Tshimanga | LB | 14 July 2017 | (Netherlands) Willem II | – |
| 4 | (Belgium) | Kenneth Schuermans | CB | 19 May 2017 | (Belgium) Westerlo | – |
| 5 | (Belgium) / (Democratic Republic of the Congo) | Pierre-Yves Ngawa | RB | 11 August 2019 | (Italy) Perugia | – |
| 15 | (Burkina Faso) / (France) | Dylan Ouédraogo | CB | 28 August 2019 | (Cyprus) Apollon Limassol | – |
| 18 | (Hungary) | Barnabás Bese | RB | 20 August 2020 | (France) Le Havre | – |
| 19 | (France) / (Guadeloupe) | Frédéric Duplus | RB | 7 June 2018 | (France) Lens | – |
| 21 | (Croatia) | Filip Benković^{ℒ} | CB | 12 January 2021 | (England) Leicester City | (30 June 2021) |
| 23 | (Germany) | Sascha Kotysch | CB | 16 January 2019 | (Belgium) Sint-Truiden | – |
| 24 | (Belgium) | Casper de Norre^{ℒ} | LB/RB | 5 October 2020 | (Belgium) Genk | (30 June 2021) |
| 27 | (Belgium) | Jordy Gillekens^{¥} | CB | Summer 2017 | Youth Squad | 11 January 2021 |
| 28 | (Belgium) | Toon Raemaekers^{¥} | CB | Summer 2019 | Youth Squad | – |
Midfielders
| 6 | (Belgium) | David Hubert | CM | 18 August 2017 | (Belgium) Gent | – |
| 8 | (Wales) / (England) | Andy King | DM / CM | 6 January 2021 | (England) Leicester City | – |
| 8 | (Belgium) | Tom Van Hyfte | CM | 10 July 2019 | (Belgium) Beerschot | – |
| 10 | (France) | Xavier Mercier | CM | 16 June 2019 | (Belgium) Cercle Brugge | – |
| 11 | (Belgium) | Thibault Vlietinck^{ℒ} | RW | 12 August 2020 | (Belgium) Club Brugge | (30 June 2021) |
| 13 | (Jordan) | Musa Al-Taamari | RW | 5 October 2020 | (Cyprus) APOEL | – |
| 14 | (Ghana) | Kamal Sowah^{ℒ} | CM | 31 January 2018 | (England) Leicester City | (30 June 2021) |
| 20 | (Belgium) / (Ghana) | Isaac Asante^{¥} | AM | Winter 2019–20 | Youth Squad | – |
| 22 | (Belgium) | Olivier Myny | LW / RW | 31 May 2018 | (Belgium) Waasland-Beveren | – |
| 27 | (Belgium) | Mandela Keita^{¥} | CM | Winter 2020–21 | Youth Squad | – |
| 29 | (Bulgaria) | Kristiyan Malinov | DM / CM | 20 August 2020 | (Bulgaria) CSKA Sofia | – |
| 33 | (Belgium) | Mathieu Maertens | CM / AM | 12 July 2017 | (Belgium) Cercle Brugge | – |
| 77 | (France) | Yohan Croizet | LW / RW | 5 February 2020 | (United States) Sporting Kansas City | 11 February 2021 |
| 99 | (Ivory Coast) | Aboubakar Keita | CM / DM | 31 January 2019 | (Denmark) Copenhagen | – |
Forwards
| 7 | (Benin) / (France) | Yannick Aguemon | CF / LW / RW | 28 June 2017 | (Belgium) Union SG | – |
| 9 | (France) | Thomas Henry | CF | 17 January 2019 | (Belgium) Tubize | – |
| 16 | (Belgium) | Siebe Schrijvers | CF / AM / RW | 15 January 2021 | (Belgium) Club Brugge | – |
| 26 | (Belgium) / (England) | Josh Eppiah^{ℒ} | CF | 24 September 2020 | (England) Leicester City | (30 June 2021) |
| 30 | (Slovenia) | Milan Tučić | CF / LW / RW | 2 September 2019 | (Slovenia) Rudar Velenje | 30 January 2021 |
| 32 | (Belgium) | Daan Vekemans^{¥} | CF | Summer 2018 | Youth Squad | – |
| 39 | (Belgium) | Arthur Allemeersch^{¥} | CF | Summer 2019 | Youth Squad | – |
| 43 | (France) | Jérémy Perbet | CF | 2 September 2019 | (Belgium) Charleroi | – |

=== Did not appear on match sheet ===
The following players were listed as part of Oud-Heveree Leuven's first team squad during the 2020–21 season, but never appeared on the match sheet

| No. | Nationality | Name | Position | Joined First Team | Previous club | Left First Team | Note |
|---|---|---|---|---|---|---|---|
| 12 | (Belgium) | Stallone Limbombe | CF | 31 January 2020 | (Belgium) Gent | – | Only played for reserves |
| 17 | (France) / (Algeria) | Samy Kehli | AM | 14 June 2018 | (Belgium) Lokeren | – | Only played for reserves |
| 18 | (Belgium) | Jo Gilis^{¥} | CF | Summer 2018 | Youth Squad | – | On loan to (Belgium) Lierse Kempenzonen until 30 June 2021 |
| 24 | (Canada) | Tristan Borges | CM / LW / RW | 22 January 2020 | (Canada) Forge FC | 5 March 2021 | Only played for reserves, then loaned to (Canada) Forge FC |
| 31 | (Belgium) | Brent Laes^{¥} | LB / LW | Summer 2019 | Youth Squad | – | On loan to (Belgium) Lierse Kempenzonen until 30 June 2021 |
| 45 | (Ghana) | Jonah Osabutey^{ℒ} | CF | 9 September 2020 | (Germany) Werder Bremen II | (30 June 2021) | Injured |

== Transfers ==
=== Summer: In ===
| No. | Pos | Player | Transferred from | Fee | Date |
|---|---|---|---|---|---|
| 43 | FW | (France) Jérémy Perbet | (Belgium) R. Charleroi S.C. | Undisclosed | 4 August 2020 |
| 21 | GK | (Denmark) Daniel Iversen | (England) Leicester City | Loan | 11 August 2020 |
| 11 | MF | (Belgium) Thibault Vlietinck | (Belgium) Club Brugge | Loan | 12 August 2020 |
| 90 | GK | (Venezuela) Rafael Romo | (Denmark) Silkeborg IF | Free | 18 August 2020 |
| 18 | DF | (Hungary) Barnabas Bese | (France) Le Havre AC | Free | 19 August 2020 |
| 29 | MF | (Bulgaria) Kristiyan Malinov | (Bulgaria) CSKA Sofia | €400,000 | 19 August 2020 |
| 45 | FW | (Ghana) Jonah Osabutey | (Germany) Werder Bremen | Loan | 9 September 2020 |
| 26 | FW | (Belgium) Josh Eppiah | (England) Leicester City | Loan | 24 September 2020 |
| 2 | DF | (Czech Republic) Václav Jemelka | (Czech Republic) Sigma Olomouc | Loan | 5 October 2020 |
| 13 | MF | (Jordan) Musa Al-Taamari | (Cyprus) APOEL FC | €1,000,000 | 5 October 2020 |
| 24 | DF | (Belgium) Casper De Norre | (Belgium) Racing Genk | Loan | 5 October 2020 |

=== Summer: Out ===
| No. | Pos | Player | Transferred to | Fee | Date |
|---|---|---|---|---|---|
| 2 | DF | (Belgium) Jan Van den Bergh | (Belgium) AA Gent | End of loan | 30 June 2020 |
| 26 | GK | (Belgium) Laurent Henkinet | (Belgium) Standard Liège | Free | 1 July 2020 |
| 11 | FW | (Belgium) Yannis Mbombo | Free agent | End of contract | 1 July 2020 |
| 18 | FW | (Belgium) Jo Gilis | (Belgium) Lierse Kempenzonen | Loan | 22 July 2020 |
| 8 | FW | (Netherlands) Sam Hendriks | (Netherlands) Go Ahead Eagles | Free | 22 September 2020 |
| 16 | GK | (South Africa) Darren Keet | Free agent | Released | 29 October 2020 |

=== Winter: In ===
| No. | Pos | Player | Transferred from | Fee | Date |
|---|---|---|---|---|---|
| 8 | MF | (Wales) Andy King | (England) Leicester City | Free | 5 January 2021 |
| 21 | DF | (Croatia) Filip Benkovic | (England) Leicester City | Loan | 12 January 2021 |
| 16 | FW | (Belgium) Siebe Schrijvers | (Belgium) Club Brugge | €2,000,000 | 15 January 2021 |

=== Winter: Out ===
| No. | Pos | Player | Transferred to | Fee | Date |
|---|---|---|---|---|---|
| 31 | DF | (Belgium) Brent Laes | (Belgium) Lierse Kempenzonen | Loan | 21 December 2020 |
| 21 | GK | (Denmark) Daniel Iversen | (England) Leicester City | End of loan | 7 January 2021 |
| 27 | DF | (Belgium) Jordy Gillekens | (Belgium) Lierse Kempenzonen | Loan | 11 January 2021 |
| 30 | FW | (Slovenia) Milan Tučić | (Slovenia) NK Bravo | Loan | 31 January 2021 |
| 77 | FW | (France) Yohan Croizet | (Hungary) Újpest FC | Free | 11 February 2021 |
| 24 | FW | (Canada) Tristan Borges | (Canada) Forge FC | Loan | 5 March 2021 |
| 27 | DF | (Belgium) Jordy Gillekens | (Belgium) Lierse Kempenzonen | Free | 19 March 2021 |
| 43 | FW | (France) Jérémy Perbet | (Belgium) RFC Liège | Free | 16 April 2021 |
| 8 | MF | (Belgium) Tom Van Hyfte | (Belgium) Mandel United | Free | 20 April 2021 |
| 31 | DF | (Belgium) Brent Laes | (Belgium) Lierse Kempenzonen | Free | 20 April 2021 |

== Pre-season and friendlies ==
Win Draw Loss

| 1 July 2020 Friendly | OH Leuven (Belgium) | 4–0 | (Belgium) Bierbeek | Oud-Heverlee, Belgium |
| | Henry; Perbet; Raemaekers | Report |

| 4 July 2020 Friendly | Club Brugge (Belgium) | 4–1 | (Belgium) OH Leuven | Knokke-Heist, Belgium |
| 18:00 CEST (UTC+2) | Vanaken; Duplus (o.g.); Badji | Report | Vekemans | Stadium: Complex Molenhoek |

| 11 July 2020 Friendly | Standard Liège (Belgium) | 1–2 | (Belgium) OH Leuven | Liège, Belgium |
| 18:00 CEST (UTC+2) | Avenatti | Report | Duplus; Allemeersch | Stadium: Academie Louis Dreyfus |

| 18 July 2020 Friendly | OH Leuven (Belgium) | 2–4 | (Belgium) RWDM47 | Machelen, Belgium |
| 15:00 CEST (UTC+2) | Myny; Limbombe | Report | Dequevy; N'Zuzi; Rommens | Stadium: Gemeentelijk Stadion |

| 18 July 2020 Friendly | OH Leuven (Belgium) | 2–0 | (Belgium) Zulte Waregem | Liège, Belgium |
| | Kotysch; Henry | Report | | Stadium: Académie Robert Louis-Dreyfus |

| 22 July 2020 Friendly | OH Leuven (Belgium) | 2–1 | (Belgium) Eupen | Leuven, Belgium |
| | | | | Stadium: King Power Stadion |

| 22 July 2020 Friendly | OH Leuven (Belgium) | 3–5 | (Belgium) Waasland-Beveren | Oud-Heverlee, Belgium |

| 25 July 2020 Friendly | OH Leuven (Belgium) | 3–0 | (Belgium) KV Mechelen | Leuven, Belgium |
| 19:00 CEST (UTC+2) | | | | Stadium: King Power Stadion |

== Competitions ==
=== Overview ===
| Competition | First match | Last match | Starting round | Final position | Record | | | | | | | |
| Competition | First match | Last match | Starting round | Final position | Pld | W | D | L | GF | GA | GD | Win % |
|---|---|---|---|---|---|---|---|---|---|---|---|---|
| Belgian First Division A | 10 August 2020 | 18 April 2021 | Matchday 1 | 11th | 34 | 12 | 9 | 13 | 54 | 59 | −5 | 35.29 |
| Belgian Cup | 11 October 2020 | 3 February 2021 | Fifth round | Sixth round | 2 | 1 | 0 | 1 | 4 | 3 | +1 | 50.00 |
| Total | | | | | 36 | 13 | 9 | 14 | 58 | 62 | −4 | 36.11 |

Source: Soccerway

=== Belgian First Division A ===
==== League table ====
| Pos | Team | Pld | W | D | L | GF | GA | GD | Pts |
|---|---|---|---|---|---|---|---|---|---|
| 9 | Beerschot | 34 | 14 | 5 | 15 | 58 | 64 | −6 | 47 |
| 10 | Zulte Waregem | 34 | 14 | 4 | 16 | 53 | 69 | −16 | 46 |
| 11 | OH Leuven | 34 | 12 | 9 | 13 | 54 | 59 | −5 | 45 |
| 12 | Eupen | 34 | 10 | 13 | 11 | 44 | 55 | −11 | 43 |
| 13 | Charleroi | 34 | 11 | 9 | 14 | 46 | 49 | −3 | 42 |

Source: Jupiler Pro League (in Dutch), Soccerway
Rules for classification: 1) Points; 2) Matches won; 3) Goal difference; 4) Goals scored; 5) Away matches won; 6) Away goal difference; 7) Away goals scored; 8) Play-off.

==== Results summary ====
| Overall | | | | | | | | Home | | | | | | Away | | | | | |
| Pld | W | D | L | GF | GA | GD | Pts | W | D | L | GF | GA | GD | W | D | L | GF | GA | GD |
|---|---|---|---|---|---|---|---|---|---|---|---|---|---|---|---|---|---|---|---|
| 34 | 12 | 9 | 13 | 54 | 59 | −5 | 45 | 8 | 2 | 7 | 24 | 23 | +1 | 4 | 7 | 6 | 30 | 36 | −6 |

Source: Jupiler Pro League

==== Results by round ====
| Round | 1 | 2 | 3 | 4 | 5 | 6 | 7 | 8 | 9 | 10 | 11 | 12 | 13 | 14 | 15 | 16 | 17 | 18 | 19 | 20 | 21 | 22 | 23 | 24 | 25 | 26 | 27 | 28 | 29 | 30 | 31 | 32 | 33 | 34 |
|---|---|---|---|---|---|---|---|---|---|---|---|---|---|---|---|---|---|---|---|---|---|---|---|---|---|---|---|---|---|---|---|---|---|---|
| Ground | H | A | H | A | H | A | A | H | A | H | A | H | H | A | H | A | H | A | H | H | A | A | H | A | H | A | H | A | H | A | A | H | A | H |
| Result | D | D | L | W | W | L | W | W | D | W | L | W | D | L | W | W | L | D | L | L | L | D | L | D | W | W | L | W | D | W | D | L | L | L |
| Position | 12 | 12 | 15 | 9 | 7 | 10 | 7 | 6 | 7 | 6 | 8 | 7 | 7 | 7 | 5 | 4 | 6 | 5 | 7 | 8 | 9 | 9 | 11 | 12 | 9 | 7 | 9 | 9 | 8 | 7 | 7 | 8 | 11 | 11 |

Source: Jupiler Pro League
A = Away; H = Home; W = Win; D = Draw; L = Loss

==== Matches ====
The league fixtures were announced on 8 July 2020.

| 10 August 2020 1 | OH Leuven | 1–1 | Eupen | Leuven |
| 19:00 CEST (UTC+2) | Kotysch 57'; Myny (yellow card) 60' | Report | Nuhu (yellow card) 48', (goal) 72'; Peeters (yellow card) 56' | Stadium: Den Dreef; Attendance: 0 Referee: Lothar D'Hondt |

| 15 August 2020 2 | Genk | 1–1 | OH Leuven | Genk |
| 16:30 CEST (UTC+2) | Wouters (yellow card) 7'; Ito 55' | Report | Ngawa (yellow card) 59'; Henry 85' | Stadium: Luminus Arena; Attendance: 0 Referee: Jasper Vergoote |

| 22 August 2020 3 | OH Leuven | 1–3 | Charleroi | Leuven |
| 18:30 CEST (UTC+2) | Mercier 34'; Sowah (yellow card) 59' | Report | Dessoleil 6'; Fall 49', (red card) 64'; Gholizadeh (yellow card) 59'; Ilaimaharitra (yellow card) 69'; Rezaei 80'; Busi (yellow card) 82'; Hendrickx (yellow card) 90+2' | Stadium: Den Dreef; Attendance: 0 Referee: Erik Lambrechts |

| 29 August 2020 4 | Waasland-Beveren | 1–3 | OH Leuven | Beveren |
| 18:30 CEST (UTC+2) | Vukotić (yellow card) 45'; Efford 51'; Caufriez (red card) 90+6' | Report | Malinov (yellow card) 23'; Mercier 30'; Kotysch 58'; Henry 90' | Stadium: Freethiel Stadion; Attendance: 0 Referee: Wesli De Cremer |

| 12 September 2020 5 | OH Leuven | 1–0 | Standard Liège | Leuven |
| 18:30 CEST (UTC+2) | Kotysch (yellow card) 32'; Sowah 77'; Raemaekers (yellow card) 84' | Report | Oularé (yellow card) 13'; Gavory (yellow card) 24' (yellow-red card) 60'; Raskin (yellow card) 51' | Stadium: Den Dreef; Attendance: 2,000; Referee: Jonathan Lardot |

| 19 September 2020 6 | Oostende | 3–1 | OH Leuven | Ostend |
| 16:15 CEST (UTC+2) | Theate (yellow card) 2'; Sakala 26', 50', (yellow card) 41'; Gueye (yellow card) 32', (goal) 60'; Bataille (yellow card) 46' | Report | Raemaekers (yellow card) 11'; Vlietinck (yellow card) 45+1'; Maertens 79' | Stadium: Versluys Arena; Attendance: 3,000; Referee: Christof Dierick |

| 26 September 2020 7 | Gent | 2–3 | OH Leuven | Ghent |
| 20:45 CEST (UTC+2) | Dorsch (yellow card) 30', (goal) 71' (pen.); Depoitre (yellow card) 65'; Kleindienst 74' (pen.) | Report | Sowah 41', 48'; Maertens 44', (yellow card) 84'; Hubert (yellow card) 85'; Romo (yellow card) 90+6' | Stadium: Ghelamco Arena; Attendance: 8.000; Referee: Jonathan Lardot |

| 3 October 2020 8 | OH Leuven | 2–1 | Zulte Waregem | Leuven |
| 18:30 CEST (UTC+2) | Henry 19'; Sowah 63', (yellow card) 74' | Report | Berahino 70' | Stadium: Den Dreef; Attendance: 3,000; Referee: Alexandre Boucaut |

| 18 October 2020 9 | Anderlecht | 2–2 | OH Leuven | Anderlecht |
| 20:30 CEST (UTC+2) | Dimata (yellow card) 35'; Verschaeren 38'; Tau 45' | Report | Malinov (yellow card) 7'; Duplus 53'; Kotysch (yellow card) 59'; Maertens 85' | Stadium: Constant Vanden Stock Stadium; Attendance: 5,500; Referee: Bram Van Driessche |

| 24 October 2020 10 | OH Leuven | 2–1 | Club Brugge | Leuven |
| 20:45 CEST (UTC+2) | Henry 21' (pen.); Malinov (yellow card) 30'; Duplus (yellow card) 39'; Mercier 57' | Report | Ricca (yellow card) 12'; Sobol (yellow card) 19'; Lang 45' (pen.), (yellow card) 55' | Stadium: Den Dreef; Attendance: 0 Referee: Alexandre Boucaut |

| 31 October 2020 11 | Beerschot | 4–2 | OH Leuven | Antwerp |
| 16:15 CET (UTC+1) | Tissoudali 21'; Suzuki 25'; Pietermaat (yellow card) 32'; Coulibaly (yellow card) 45'; Van den Bergh (yellow card) 56'; Sanusi 62'; Holzhauser 65'; Dom (yellow card) 74'; Bourdin (yellow card) 79' | Report | Mercier 16'; Henry 82' (pen.); Jemelka (yellow card) 87' | Stadium: Olympisch Stadion; Attendance: 0 Referee: Nicolas Laforge |

| 23 November 2020 13 | OH Leuven | 2–2 | Sint-Truiden | Leuven |
| 20:45 CET (UTC+1) | Malinov (yellow card) 42'; Henry 45+2' (pen.); Eppiah 73' | Report | Nazon 27', 84', (yellow card) 28'; Durkin (yellow card) 61'; Cacace (yellow card) 90'; García (yellow card) 90+2' | Stadium: Den Dreef; Attendance: 0 Referee: Jasper Vergoote |

| 30 November 2020 14 | Antwerp | 3–2 | OH Leuven | Antwerp |
| 20:45 CET (UTC+1) | Batubinsika 5'; Mbokani 8'; Haroun (yellow card) 10'; Juklerød (yellow card) 41'; Hongla 57'; Seck (yellow card) 88' | Report | Henry 12' (pen.), (yellow card) 88'; Malinov (yellow card) 15'; Sowah 17'; Maertens (yellow card) 20'; Hubert (yellow card) 30'; Ngawa (yellow card) 38' | Stadium: Bosuilstadion; Attendance: 0 Referee: Wim Smet |

| 5 December 2020 15 | OH Leuven | 2–1 | Cercle Brugge | Leuven |
| 18:30 CET (UTC+1) | Sowah 10'; Mercier (yellow card) 42'; Henry 54'; Maertens (red card) 78'; Hubert (yellow card) 81' | Report | Kanouté (yellow card) 50'; Taravel (yellow card) 81'; Ugbo 90+1' | Stadium: Den Dreef; Attendance: 0 Referee: Nathan Verboomen |

| 8 December 2020 12 | OH Leuven | 2–0 | Excel Mouscron | Leuven |
| 18:30 CET (UTC+1) | Ngawa 56'; Henry 84' | Report | Olinga (yellow card) 29'; Agouzoul (yellow card) 40'; Onana (yellow card) 42'; Bakić (yellow card) 77'; Brym (yellow card) 87' | Stadium: Den Dreef; Attendance: 0 Referee: Wesley Alen |

| 12 December 2020 16 | Kortrijk | 0–3 | OH Leuven | Kortrijk |
| 18:30 CET (UTC+1) | Golubović (yellow card) 49'; Hines-Ike (yellow card) 82' | Report | Henry 47', 64', 89'; Kotysch (yellow card) 65' | Stadium: Guldensporen Stadion; Attendance: 0 Referee: Wesli De Cremer |

| 15 December 2020 18 | Excel Mouscron | 2–2 | OH Leuven | Mouscron |
| 18:45 CET (UTC+1) | Ciranni (yellow card) 29'; Agouzoul (yellow card) 30'; Koffi (yellow card) 54'; Olinga (yellow card) 59'; da Costa 71', 77'; Tabekou (yellow card) 90+2' | Report | Sowah (yellow card) 30'; Vlietinck 42'; Hubert 55' (pen.); Vekemans (yellow card) 74' | Stadium: Stade Le Canonnier; Attendance: 0 Referee: Erik Lambrechts |

| 20 December 2020 17 | OH Leuven | 1–2 | KV Mechelen | Leuven |
| 16:00 CET (UTC+1) | Vlietinck (yellow card) 43'; De Norre (yellow card) 54'; Henry 61', (yellow card) 90+3' | Report | Vranckx (yellow card) 8'; Mrabti 27'; Hubert 31' (o.g.); Hairemans (yellow card) 83'; Walsh (yellow card) 90+2'; Engvall (yellow card) 90+3' | Stadium: Den Dreef; Attendance: 0 Referee: Jan Boterberg |

| 26 December 2020 19 | OH Leuven | 1–2 | Oostende | Leuven |
| 18:30 CET (UTC+1) | Malinov 35'; Ngawa (yellow card) 82' | Report | D'Arpino (yellow card) 29'; Skúlason (yellow card) 37'; Theate 59'; Ngawa 72' (o.g.); Bataille (yellow card) 79' | Stadium: Den Dreef; Attendance: 0 Referee: Bert Put |

| 10 January 2021 30 | OH Leuven | 1–0 | Anderlecht | Leuven |
| 18:15 CET (UTC+1) | Jemelka (yellow card) 51'; Henry 87' (pen.) | Report | El Hadj (yellow card) 45'; Colassin (yellow card) 90+4'; Nmecha (yellow card) 90+5' | Stadium: Den Dreef; Attendance: 0 Referee: Nathan Verboomen |

| 17 January 2021 20 | Sint-Truiden | 3–1 | OH Leuven | Sint-Truiden |
| 20:45 CET (UTC+1) | Suzuki 10', 53', (yellow card) 50'; Mboyo 39'; García (yellow card) 78' | Report | Henry 25'; Ngawa (red card) 37' | Stadium: Stayen; Attendance: 0 Referee: Wesli De Cremer |

| 21 January 2021 25 | Zulte Waregem | 2–3 | OH Leuven | Waregem |
| 18:45 CET (UTC+1) | Armenakas 28'; De Smet 42'; Seck (yellow card) 83' | Report | Mercier 44', 90+5' (pen.); Henry 75' | Stadium: Regenboogstadion; Attendance: 0 Referee: Jasper Vergoote |

| 24 January 2021 21 | OH Leuven | 0–3 | Gent | Leuven |
| 20:45 CET (UTC+1) | Henry (yellow card) 28' (yellow-red card) 79' | Report | Mohammadi 6'; Kums (yellow card) 45', (goal) 50'; Bukari (yellow card) 46', (goal) 54' | Stadium: Den Dreef; Attendance: 0 Referee: Wesley Alen |

| 27 January 2021 22 | Charleroi | 1–1 | OH Leuven | Charleroi |
| 21:00 CET (UTC+1) | Gillet (yellow card) 46'; Fall (yellow card) 49'; Dessoleil 61' | Report | Sowah 12'; Tshimanga (yellow card) 60'; Malinov (yellow card) 64'; Al-Taamari (yellow card) 90' | Stadium: Stade du Pays de Charleroi; Attendance: 0 Referee: Kevin Van Damme |

| 30 January 2021 23 | OH Leuven | 0–1 | Beerschot | Leuven |
| 18:30 CET (UTC+1) | Sowah (yellow card) 34'; Henry (yellow card) 48'; Schrijvers (yellow card) 90+3' | Report | Pietermaat (yellow card) 41'; Prychynenko (yellow card) 72'; Tissoudali 74' | Stadium: Den Dreef; Attendance: 0 Referee: Bert Put |

| 6 February 2021 24 | Standard Liège | 1–1 | OH Leuven | Liège |
| 20:45 CET (UTC+1) | Laifis (yellow card) 38'; Dussenne (yellow card) 82' (yellow-red card) 87'; Klauss 84' | Report | Henry 60'; Raemaekers (yellow card) 90+3' | Stadium: Stade Maurice Dufrasne; Attendance: 0 Referee: Lawrence Visser |

| 12 February 2021 26 | OH Leuven | 3–1 | Kortrijk | Leuven |
| 20:45 CET (UTC+1) | Henry 10', 20'; Malinov (yellow card) 34' (yellow-red card) 36'; Sowah 40' | Report | Makarenko (yellow card) 38'; Gano 52'; Stojanović (yellow card) 85'; Guèye (yellow card) 87' | Stadium: Den Dreef; Attendance: 0 Referee: Wesley Alen |

| 22 February 2021 27 | Club Brugge | 3–0 | OH Leuven | Bruges |
| 20:45 CET (UTC+1) | Van Der Brempt 8', (yellow card) 67'; Vormer 39' (pen.); Mata 90+3' | Report | Hubert (yellow card) 50'; Jemelka (yellow card) 76'; Asante (yellow card) 86' | Stadium: Jan Breydel Stadium; Attendance: 0 Referee: Jan Boterberg |

| 1 March 2021 28 | OH Leuven | 2–0 | Antwerp | Leuven |
| 20:45 CET (UTC+1) | Mercier 25'; Al-Taamari 29'; Malinov (yellow card) 47' | Report | Seck (yellow card) 38'; Buta (yellow card) 85' | Stadium: Den Dreef; Attendance: 0 Referee: Lothar D'hondt |

| 6 March 2021 29 | Eupen | 3–3 | OH Leuven | Eupen |
| 16:15 CET (UTC+1) | Prevljak (penalty missed) 8'; Heris 29', (yellow card) 64'; Amat (yellow card) 32'; Musona 43' (pen.), 67'; Beck (yellow card) 85'; Baby (yellow card) 90' | Report | Malinov 27', (yellow card) 69'; Henry 36'; Mercier 55'; Hubert (yellow card) 90' | Stadium: Kehrwegstadion; Attendance: 0 Referee: Bert Put |

| 21 March 2021 31 | KV Mechelen | 2–2 | OH Leuven | Mechelen |
| 16:00 CET (UTC+1) | Defour (yellow card) 28'; Vranckx 30'; Schoofs (yellow card) 53'; Druijf 80' (pen.); Bijker (yellow card) 90+5' | Report | De Norre (yellow card) 36', (goal) 40'; Schrijvers 70' | Stadium: Achter de Kazerne; Attendance: 0 Referee: Jasper Vergoote |

| 5 April 2021 32 | OH Leuven | 2–3 | Genk | Leuven |
| 13:30 CEST (UTC+2) | Ngawa (yellow card) 25'; Mercier 74'; Henry 90+2' | Report | Thorstvedt 7'; Bongonda 81'; Onuachu 83' | Stadium: Den Dreef; Attendance: 0 Referee: Jan Boterberg |

| 10 April 2021 33 | Cercle Brugge | 3–0 | OH Leuven | Bruges |
| 16:15 CEST (UTC+2) | Hoggas (red card) 33'; Ugbo 44', 56'; Taravel (yellow card) 58', (goal) 73'; Van der Bruggen (yellow card) 69'; Decostere (yellow card) 77'; Deman (yellow card) 82' | Report | De Norre (yellow card) 54' | Stadium: Jan Breydel Stadium; Attendance: 0 Referee: Lothar D'hondt |

| 18 April 2021 34 | OH Leuven | 1–2 | Waasland-Beveren | Leuven |
| 18:00 CEST (UTC+2) | Malinov (yellow card) 7'; Henry (yellow card) 42'; Schrijvers 47'; Aguemon (yellow card) 90+6' | Report | Sinani (yellow card) 25'; Verstraete 30', 67', (yellow card) 55'; Koita (yellow card) 70'; Schryvers (yellow card) 88' | Stadium: Den Dreef; Attendance: 0 Referee: Kevin Van Damme |

=== Belgian Cup ===
| 11 October 2020 Fifth round | Knokke FC | 0–2 | OH Leuven | Knokke |
| 16:00 CEST (UTC+2) | Martens (yellow card) 66' | | Mercier 35'; Duplus (yellow card) 76', (goal) 90'; Myny (yellow card) 78' | Stadium: Burg. Graaf Leopold Lippens Park; Referee: Simon Bourdeau'hui |

| 3 February 2021 Sixth round | OH Leuven | 2–3 | Cercle Brugge | Leuven |
| 18:00 CET (UTC+1) | Maertens 3'; Eppiah (yellow card) 17'; Hubert 90+3' | Report | Hotić 1' (pen.); Marcelin 39', (red card) 81'; Taravel 73' (pen.); Musaba (yellow card) 82' | Stadium: Den Dreef; Attendance: 0 |

== Statistics ==
=== Appearances ===
Players with no appearances not included in the list.

| No. | Pos. | Nat. | Name | First Division A | | | Belgian Cup | | | Total | | |
| No. | Pos. | Nat. | Name | Starts | Sub | Unused Sub | Starts | Sub | Unused Sub | Starts | Sub | Unused Sub |
|---|---|---|---|---|---|---|---|---|---|---|---|---|
| 1 | GK | (Thailand) | Kawin Thamsatchanan | 0 | 1 | 7 | 0 | 0 | 0 | 0 | 1 | 7 |
| 2 | DF | (Czech Republic) | Václav Jemelka | 21 | 2 | 1 | 2 | 0 | 0 | 23 | 2 | 1 |
| 3 | DF | (Belgium) | Derrick Tshimanga | 6 | 4 | 6 | 0 | 1 | 0 | 6 | 5 | 6 |
| 4 | DF | (Belgium) | Kenneth Schuermans | 1 | 0 | 0 | 0 | 0 | 0 | 1 | 0 | 0 |
| 5 | DF | (Belgium) | Pierre-Yves Ngawa | 22 | 5 | 0 | 0 | 0 | 0 | 22 | 5 | 0 |
| 6 | MF | (Belgium) | David Hubert | 30 | 1 | 1 | 1 | 1 | 0 | 31 | 2 | 1 |
| 7 | MF | (Benin) | Yannick Aguemon | 2 | 4 | 0 | 0 | 0 | 0 | 2 | 4 | 0 |
| 8 | MF | (Wales) | Andy King | 0 | 1 | 4 | 0 | 0 | 1 | 0 | 1 | 5 |
| 8 | MF | (Belgium) | Tom Van Hyfte | 0 | 1 | 4 | 0 | 0 | 0 | 0 | 1 | 4 |
| 9 | FW | (France) | Thomas Henry | 31 | 0 | 0 | 1 | 1 | 0 | 32 | 1 | 0 |
| 10 | MF | (France) | Xavier Mercier | 34 | 0 | 0 | 1 | 0 | 0 | 35 | 0 | 0 |
| 11 | MF | (Belgium) | Thibault Vlietinck | 17 | 2 | 5 | 1 | 0 | 0 | 18 | 2 | 5 |
| 12 | FW | (Belgium) | Stallone Limbombe | 0 | 0 | 3 | 0 | 0 | 0 | 0 | 0 | 3 |
| 13 | MF | (Jordan) | Musa Al-Taamari | 11 | 11 | 2 | 0 | 0 | 0 | 11 | 11 | 2 |
| 14 | MF | (Ghana) | Kamal Sowah | 34 | 0 | 0 | 2 | 0 | 0 | 36 | 0 | 0 |
| 15 | DF | (Burkina Faso) | Dylan Ouédraogo | 8 | 1 | 11 | 0 | 0 | 0 | 8 | 1 | 11 |
| 16 | MF | (Belgium) | Siebe Schrijvers | 5 | 7 | 2 | 1 | 0 | 0 | 6 | 7 | 2 |
| 18 | DF | (Hungary) | Barnabás Bese | 7 | 5 | 6 | 1 | 0 | 0 | 8 | 5 | 6 |
| 19 | DF | (France) | Frédéric Duplus | 6 | 0 | 1 | 1 | 0 | 0 | 7 | 0 | 1 |
| 20 | MF | (Belgium) | Isaac Asante | 3 | 2 | 3 | 0 | 0 | 1 | 3 | 2 | 4 |
| 21 | DF | (Croatia) | Filip Benković | 0 | 0 | 10 | 0 | 0 | 0 | 0 | 0 | 10 |
| 22 | MF | (Belgium) | Olivier Myny | 2 | 14 | 1 | 0 | 2 | 0 | 2 | 16 | 1 |
| 23 | DF | (Germany) | Sascha Kotysch | 19 | 1 | 2 | 2 | 0 | 0 | 21 | 1 | 2 |
| 24 | DF | (Belgium) | Casper de Norre | 23 | 0 | 2 | 2 | 0 | 0 | 25 | 0 | 2 |
| 25 | DF | (Belgium) | Louis Patris | 2 | 0 | 1 | 0 | 0 | 0 | 2 | 0 | 1 |
| 26 | FW | (Belgium) | Josh Eppiah | 0 | 11 | 4 | 1 | 0 | 0 | 1 | 11 | 4 |
| 27 | MF | (Belgium) | Mandela Keita | 1 | 0 | 0 | 0 | 0 | 0 | 1 | 0 | 0 |
| 28 | DF | (Belgium) | Toon Raemaekers | 7 | 3 | 11 | 0 | 0 | 2 | 7 | 3 | 13 |
| 29 | MF | (Bulgaria) | Kristiyan Malinov | 25 | 2 | 1 | 1 | 0 | 0 | 26 | 2 | 1 |
| 32 | FW | (Belgium) | Daan Vekemans | 2 | 12 | 9 | 0 | 1 | 1 | 2 | 13 | 10 |
| 33 | MF | (Belgium) | Mathieu Maertens | 18 | 1 | 2 | 2 | 0 | 0 | 20 | 1 | 2 |
| 38 | GK | (Belgium) | Oregan Ravet | 0 | 0 | 12 | 0 | 0 | 1 | 0 | 0 | 13 |
| 39 | FW | (Belgium) | Arthur Allemeersch | 1 | 1 | 5 | 1 | 1 | 0 | 2 | 2 | 5 |
| 43 | FW | (France) | Jérémy Perbet | 0 | 2 | 3 | 0 | 0 | 0 | 0 | 2 | 3 |
| 90 | GK | (Venezuela) | Rafael Romo | 28 | 1 | 2 | 2 | 0 | 0 | 30 | 1 | 2 |
| 99 | MF | (Ivory Coast) | Aboubakar Keita | 0 | 3 | 2 | 0 | 0 | 0 | 0 | 3 | 2 |
Players that have appeared during the season, but then left
| 16 | GK | (South Africa) | Darren Keet (released) | 1 | 0 | 1 | 0 | 0 | 0 | 1 | 0 | 1 |
| 21 | GK | (Denmark) | Daniel Iversen (loan return to Leicester City) | 5 | 0 | 11 | 0 | 0 | 1 | 5 | 0 | 12 |
| 27 | DF | (Belgium) | Jordy Gillekens (on loan to Lierse Kempenzonen) | 0 | 0 | 1 | 0 | 0 | 0 | 0 | 0 | 1 |
| 30 | FW | (Slovenia) | Milan Tučić (on loan to NK Bravo) | 0 | 1 | 0 | 0 | 0 | 0 | 0 | 1 | 0 |
| 77 | MF | (France) | Yohan Croizet (transferred to Újpest) | 2 | 3 | 2 | 0 | 0 | 0 | 2 | 3 | 2 |

=== Goalscorers ===
| Rank | No. | Pos | Nat | Name | Pro League | Belgian Cup | Total |
|---|---|---|---|---|---|---|---|
| 1 | 9 | FW | (France) | Thomas Henry | 21 | 0 | 21 |
| 2 | 10 | MF | (France) | Xavier Mercier | 9 | 1 | 10 |
| 3 | 14 | MF | (Ghana) | Kamal Sowah | 8 | 0 | 8 |
| 4 | 33 | MF | (Belgium) | Mathieu Maertens | 3 | 1 | 4 |
| 5 | 6 | MF | (Belgium) | David Hubert | 1 | 1 | 2 |
| 5 | 16 | FW | (Belgium) | Siebe Schrijvers | 2 | 0 | 2 |
| 5 | 19 | DF | (France) | Frédéric Duplus | 1 | 1 | 2 |
| 5 | 23 | DF | (Germany) | Sascha Kotysch | 2 | 0 | 2 |
| 5 | 29 | MF | (Bulgaria) | Kristiyan Malinov | 2 | 0 | 2 |
| 6 | 5 | DF | (Belgium) | Pierre-Yves Ngawa | 1 | 0 | 1 |
| 6 | 11 | FW | (Belgium) | Thibault Vlietinck | 1 | 0 | 1 |
| 6 | 13 | FW | (Jordan) | Musa Al-Taamari | 1 | 0 | 1 |
| 6 | 24 | DF | (Belgium) | Casper De Norre | 1 | 0 | 1 |
| 6 | 26 | FW | (Belgium) | Josh Eppiah | 1 | 0 | 1 |
| Totals | | | | | 54 | 4 | 58 |

=== Assists ===
| Rank | No. | Pos | Nat | Name | Pro League | Belgian Cup | Total |
|---|---|---|---|---|---|---|---|
| 1 | 10 | MF | (France) | Xavier Mercier | 16 | 1 | 17 |
| 2 | 14 | MF | (Ghana) | Kamal Sowah | 5 | 0 | 5 |
| 3 | 9 | FW | (France) | Thomas Henry | 3 | 1 | 4 |
| 3 | 24 | MF | (Belgium) | Casper De Norre | 4 | 0 | 4 |
| 4 | 2 | DF | (Czech Republic) | Václav Jemelka | 3 | 0 | 3 |
| 5 | 16 | FW | (Belgium) | Siebe Schrijvers | 1 | 1 | 2 |
| 6 | 11 | MF | (Belgium) | Thibault Vlietinck | 1 | 0 | 1 |
| 6 | 13 | FW | (Jordan) | Musa Al-Taamari | 1 | 0 | 1 |
| 6 | 22 | MF | (Belgium) | Olivier Myny | 1 | 0 | 1 |
| 6 | 26 | FW | (Belgium) | Josh Eppiah | 1 | 0 | 1 |
| 6 | 29 | MF | (Bulgaria) | Kristiyan Malinov | 1 | 0 | 1 |
| Totals | | | | | 37 | 3 | 40 |
