= Emmanuel Toku =

Ghanaian footballer (born 2000)

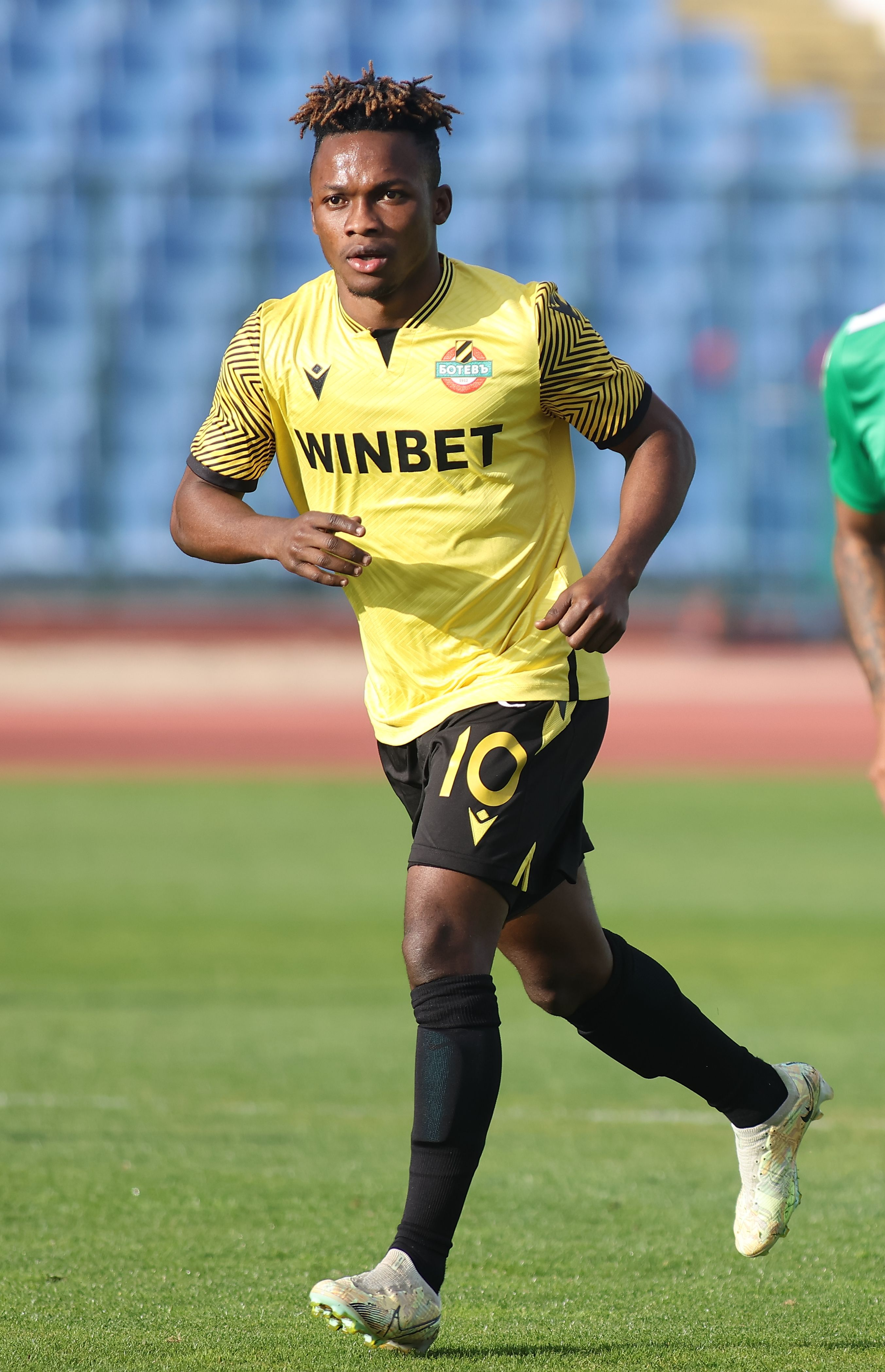
- Toku in October 2022

Personal information
- Date of birth: 10 July 2000 (age 26)
- Place of birth: Kumasi, Ghana
- Height: 1.73 m (5 ft 8 in)
- Positions: Attacking midfielder; winger

Team information
- Current team: Buriram United
- Number: 26

Senior career*
Years	Team	Apps	(Gls)
2015–2019	Cheetah		
2019–2021	Fremad Amager	34	(9)
2021	→ Botev Plovdiv (loan)	16	(3)
2021–2022	Botev Plovdiv	47	(5)
2023–2025	OH Leuven	3	(0)
2023	OH Leuven U23	2	(0)
2023–2024	→ AaB (loan)	16	(1)
2024–2025	→ AEL Limassol (loan)	27	(2)
2025–	Buriram United	0	(0)

International career
2016–2017	Ghana U17		
2019	Ghana U20	2	(0)
- * Club domestic league appearances and goals as of 11 November 2025 (UTC)

Emmanuel Toku (born 10 July 2000) is a Ghanaian professional footballer who plays as an attacking midfielder or a winger for Buriram United. He played for Ghana at the youth level, playing for them in the 2017 FIFA U-17 World Cup and serving as the captain of the Ghana U-20 national team in 2019.

== Club career ==
=== Fremad Amager ===
==== 2019–20 season ====
Toku started his career with Ghanaian side Cheetah F.C. In August 2019, he signed for Danish 1st Division side Fremad Amager. He made his debut on 25 October 2019 in a 2–1 loss against Hvidovre IF, coming on as a substitute for Théo Chendri at half time. He made his first start for the club on 2 November 2020 in a 4–0 loss to Vejle Boldklub. Toku In a match against HB Køge, he came on in the 60th minute to assist a goal for Lukas Engel in the 83rd minute, which helped the team salvage a 1–1 draw at the end of the match. After that performance he featured more, going on to start in 8th successive times, in the process scoring his first goal in a 4–2 home win against Fredericia HK on 29 February 2020. He scored his second league in a heavy 4–0 home win against Nykøbing FC on 1 July 2020.

On 25 July 2020, he scored a goal against the eventual league champions Vejle Boldklub during the last match of the season which ended in a 4–1 home win for his team. At the end of his first season with the club, he played 18 league matches and scored 3 goals.

==== 2020–21 season ====
Toku signed a new contract with the Danish team in August 2020, which extended his stay to 2023. He was key member of the club in his second season. He started in the first match of the season on 13 September 2020 against Vendsyssel FF, in the process scoring a screamer for his first goal of the season in the 40th minute of the match which ended in 6–0 win. He also scored the 3rd goal in the 73rd minute in a 4–0 match against Hvidovre IF on 20 September 2020. Toku scored a brace on 26 September 2020 in 2–0 win over Skive JK and scored another brace in two minutes in a match against Hobro IK which ended in a 4–0 win.

The club confirmed that other teams had shown interest in signing him during the winter transfer season. He played in 16 matches in the first round of the league and scored 6 goals before he moved on loan to Botev Plovdiv.

=== Botev Plovdiv ===
After playing the first round of the season with Fremad Amager, Toku signed an 18-month loan with Bulgarian Parva liga side Botev Plovdiv on 11 February 2021. He made his debut for the club in a 2–0 loss against FC Arda Kardzhali on 12 February 2021 and enjoyed 74 minutes of action before being substituted as he was named in the team's starting line-up for the game. In September 2021, he joined the club on a permanent deal, signing a three-year contract with the Plovdiv-based club. He was assigned the number 10 jersey.

=== Leuven ===
In January 2023, Toku joined Belgian Pro League club OH Leuven. On 1 September 2023, Toku joined newly relegated Danish 1st Division team AaB on a one-year loan deal including a purchase option.

=== Loan to AEL Limassol ===
On 2 August 2024, Toku was announced at AEL Limassol.

== International career ==
Toku played in the 2017 FIFA U-17 World Cup and later captained the national under-20 team at the 2019 African Games.

== Career statistics ==
As of match played 24 October 2024

Club	Season	League			Cup		Continental		Other		Total	
Club	Season	Division	Apps	Goals	Apps	Goals	Apps	Goals	Apps	Goals	Apps	Goals
Fremad Amager	2019–20	Danish 1st Division	18	3	1	0	—		—		19	3
Fremad Amager	2020–21	Danish 1st Division	16	6	4	3	—		—		20	9
Fremad Amager	Total		34	9	5	3	—		—		39	12
Botev Plovdiv (loan)	2020–21	Bulgarian First League	16	3	1	0	—		—		17	3
Botev Plovdiv	2021–22	Bulgarian First League	31	4	1	0	—		—		32	4
Botev Plovdiv	2022–23	Bulgarian First League	17	1	2	0	2	0	—		21	1
Botev Plovdiv	Total		48	5	3	0	2	0	—		53	5
OH Leuven	2022–23	Belgian Pro League	3	0	0	0	—		—		3	0
AaB (loan)	2023–24	Danish 1st Division	15	1	2	0	—		—		17	1
AEL Limassol (loan)	2024–25	Cypriot First Division	6	0	0	0	—		—		6	0
Career total			122	18	11	3	2	0	0	0	135	21

== Honours ==
Ghana U17

- Africa U-17 Cup of Nations runner-up: 2017

Individual

- Bulgarian First League Goal of the Week: 2021–22 (Week 17) v. Botev Vratsa
