= Louis Patris =

Belgian footballer

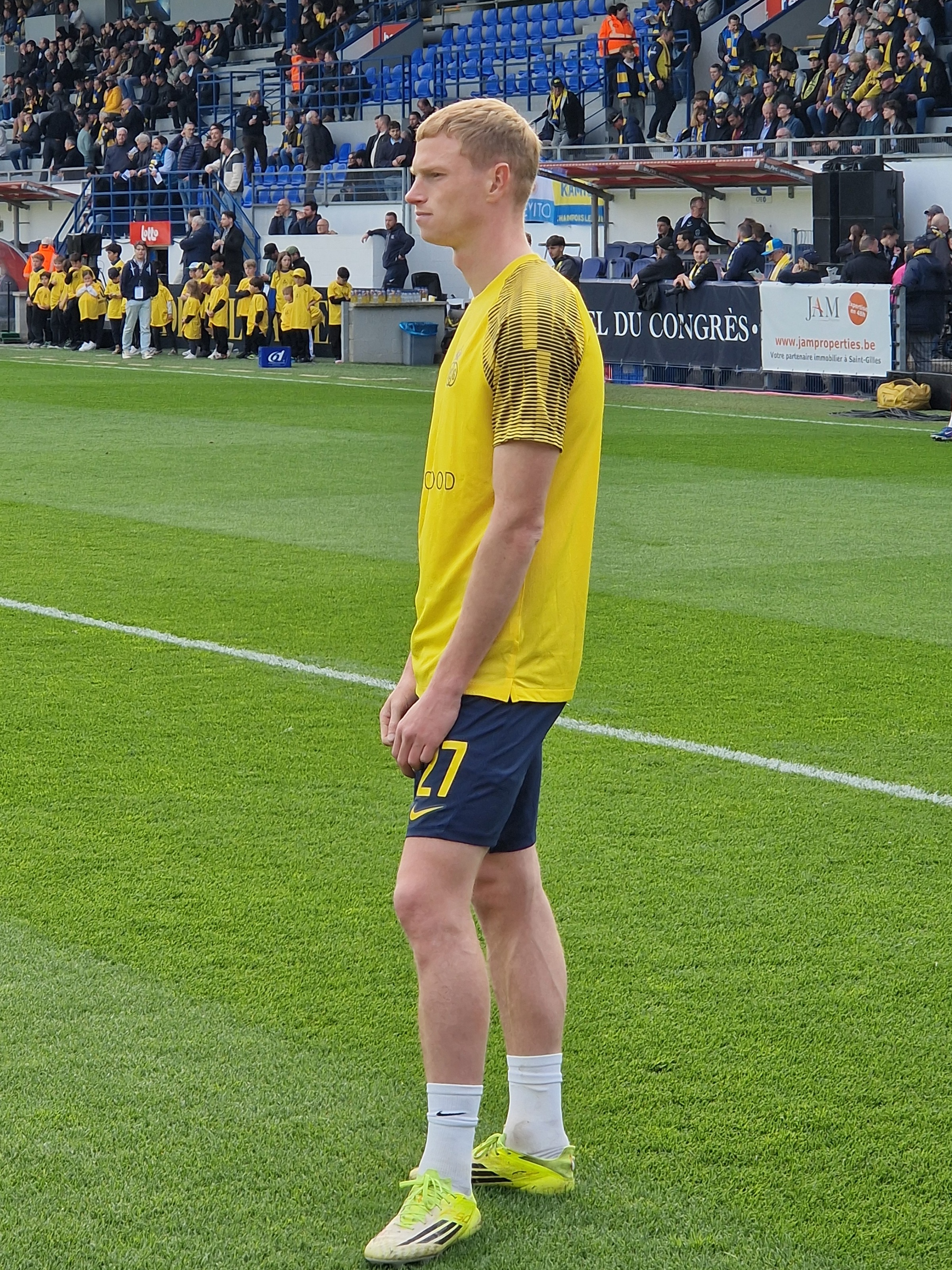
- Patris with Union SG in 2026

Personal information
- Date of birth: 7 June 2001 (age 25)
- Place of birth: Gembloux, Belgium
- Height: 1.87 m (6 ft 2 in)
- Positions: Centre-back; right-back

Team information
- Current team: Union SG
- Number: 2

Youth career
- 2010–2015: Standard Liège
- 2015–2021: OH Leuven

Senior career*
Years	Team	Apps	(Gls)
2021–2023	OH Leuven	41	(2)
2023–2025	Anderlecht	17	(1)
2023	RSCA Futures	1	(0)
2024–2025	→ Sint-Truiden (loan)	29	(1)
2025	Sint-Truiden	6	(0)
2025–	Union SG	37	(1)

International career
2017	Belgium U16	2	(0)
2017	Belgium U17	4	(0)
2019	Belgium U18	1	(0)
2019	Belgium U19	2	(0)
2022–2023	Belgium U21	6	(0)
- * Club domestic league appearances and goals as of 25 October 2026

Louis Patris (born 7 June 2001) is a Belgian professional footballer who plays as a centre-back or right-back for Belgian Pro League club Union SG.

== Career ==
In 2015 Patris joins OH Leuven from Standard Liège. He made his debut for the club on 1 March 2021 in the home match against Antwerp.

On 8 July 2023, Patris joined fellow Belgian Pro League team Anderlecht for a fee of €3.5 million.

On 4 September 2024, Patris was loaned to Sint-Truiden, with an option to buy. The option was exercised in April 2025, allowing Patris to move to Sint-Truiden on permanent basis in the summer of 2025.

== Career statistics ==
As of match played 25 October 2026

Appearances and goals by club, season and competition
Club	Season	League			Belgian Cup		Europe		Other		Total	
Club	Season	Division	Apps	Goals	Apps	Goals	Apps	Goals	Apps	Goals	Apps	Goals
OH Leuven	2020–21	Belgian Pro League	2	0	—		—		—		2	0
OH Leuven	2021–22	Belgian Pro League	6	0	—		—		—		6	0
OH Leuven	2022–23	Belgian Pro League	33	2	2	0	—		—		35	2
OH Leuven	Total		41	2	2	0	—		—		43	2
Anderlecht	2023–24	Belgian Pro League	16	1	2	0	—		—		18	1
Anderlecht	2024–25	Belgian Pro League	1	0	0	0	0	0	—		1	0
Anderlecht	Total		17	1	2	0	0	0	—		19	1
RSCA Futures	2023–24	Challenger Pro League	1	0	—		—		—		1	0
Sint-Truiden (loan)	2024–25	Belgian Pro League	29	1	3	0	—		—		32	1
Sint-Truiden	2025–26	Belgian Pro League	6	0	—		—		—		6	0
Union Saint-Gilloise	2025–26	Belgian Pro League	28	0	6	0	5 (Note: Appearances in UEFA Champions League)	0	—		39	0
Union Saint-Gilloise	2026–27	Belgian Pro League	9	1	1	0	4 (Note: One appearance in UEFA Champions League, three appearances in UEFA Europa League)	0	1 (Note: Appearance in Belgian Super Cup)	0	15	1
Union Saint-Gilloise	Total		37	1	7	0	9	0	1	0	54	1
Career total			131	5	14	0	9	0	1	0	155	5

== Honours ==
Union SG

- Belgian Cup: 2025–26
