= Valentin Cojocaru =

Romanian footballer (born 1995)

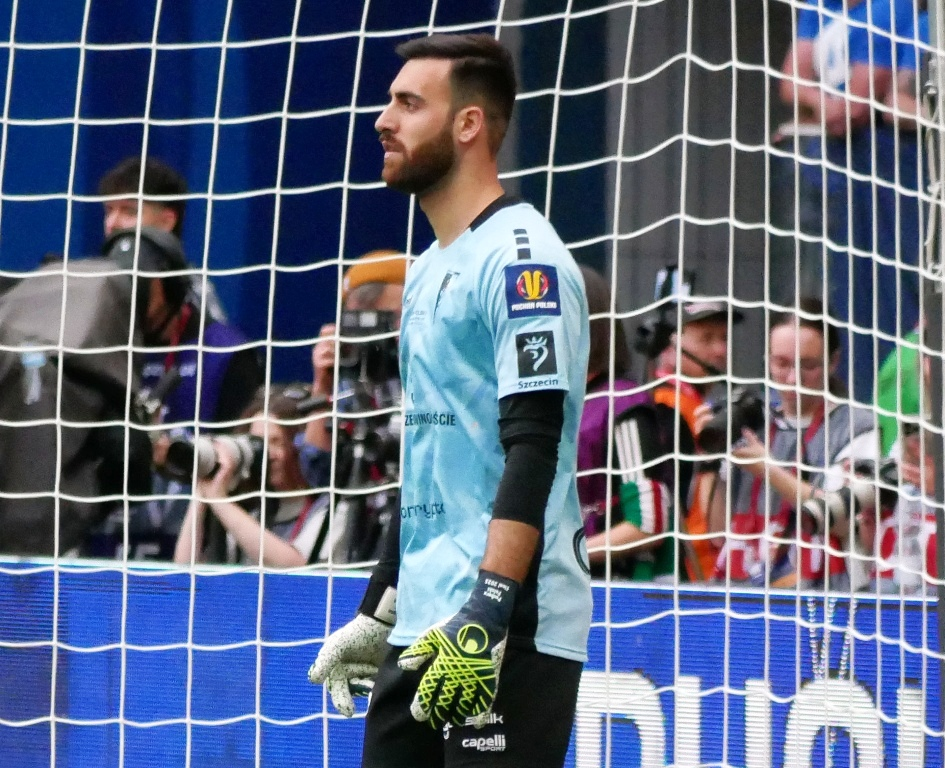
- Cojocaru with Pogoń Szczecin in 2025

Personal information
- Full name: Valentin Alexandru Cojocaru
- Date of birth: 1 October 1995 (age 31)
- Place of birth: Bucharest, Romania
- Height: 1.95 m (6 ft 5 in)
- Position: Goalkeeper

Team information
- Current team: Pogoń Szczecin
- Number: 77

Youth career
- 2004–2007: Dinamo București
- 2007–2011: Steaua București

Senior career*
Years	Team	Apps	(Gls)
2010–2011	Steaua București II	3	(0)
2011–2017	Steaua București	19	(0)
2016–2017	→ Crotone (loan)	0	(0)
2017	→ Frosinone (loan)	0	(0)
2017	Apollon Limassol	0	(0)
2018–2021	Viitorul Constanța	70	(0)
2020	→ Voluntari (loan)	19	(0)
2021–2022	Dnipro-1	14	(0)
2022	→ Feyenoord (loan)	0	(0)
2022–2024	OH Leuven	37	(0)
2023–2024	→ Pogoń Szczecin (loan)	27	(0)
2024–	Pogoń Szczecin	77	(0)

International career
2014–2015	Romania U19	7	(0)
2014–2016	Romania U21	14	(0)
- * Club domestic league appearances and goals as of 2 November 2026

Valentin Alexandru Cojocaru (born 1 October 1995) is a Romanian professional footballer who plays as a goalkeeper for Ekstraklasa club Pogoń Szczecin and the Romania national team.

== Club career ==
=== Steaua București ===
In 2011, Cojocaru was selected for a trial at Liverpool, but he returned to Steaua because the clubs could not agree on a transfer sum. He made his first appearance for Steaua București on 7 May 2013 against Gloria Bistrița, a game won with the score of 1–0. He is the son of former football referee Ispas Cojocaru.

On 1 September 2016, Crotone announced the signing of Cojocaru on loan with a buy-out option.

On 26 January 2017, Cojocaru joined Italian club Frosinone on loan.

=== Apollon Limassol ===
On 7 September 2017, Apollon Limassol announced the signing of Cojocaru. On 22 January 2018, Apollon Limassol mutually agreed to end player's contract.

=== Viitorul Constanța ===
On 24 January 2018, Cojocaru joined Liga I side Viitorul Constanța.

On 24 January 2020, Cojocaru was sent on loan to another Liga I club Voluntari until the end of the season with a buy-out option.

=== Dnipro-1 ===
On 5 July 2021, he joined Dnipro-1.

==== Loan to Feyenoord ====
In March 2022, he moved on loan to Feyenoord.

=== Pogoń Szczecin ===
After a year-long stint with Belgian side OH Leuven, Cojocaru moved to Polish Ekstraklasa club Pogoń Szczecin on a season-long loan on 4 September 2023. After establishing himself as the first-choice goalkeeper, his move was made permanent on 5 April 2024, two days after reaching the Polish Cup final with Pogoń.

== International career ==
In November 2016, Cojocaru received his first call-up to the senior Romania squad for matches against Poland and Russia.

== Career statistics ==
As of match played 2 November 2026

Appearances and goals by club, season and competition
Club	Season	League			National cup (Note: Includes Cupa României, Belgian Cup, Polish Cup)		League cup (Note: Includes Cupa Ligii)		Europe		Other		Total	
Club	Season	Division	Apps	Goals	Apps	Goals	Apps	Goals	Apps	Goals	Apps	Goals	Apps	Goals
Steaua București II	2010–11	Liga II	3	0	—		—		—		—		3	0
Steaua București	2011–12	Liga I	0	0	0	0	—		0	0	0	0	0	0
Steaua București	2012–13	Liga I	3	0	0	0	—		0	0	—		3	0
Steaua București	2014–15	Liga I	7	0	4	0	2	0	0	0	0	0	13	0
Steaua București	2015–16	Liga I	7	0	4	0	3	0	5 (Note: Four appearances in UEFA Champions League, one appearance in UEFA Europa League)	0	1 (Note: Appearance in Supercupa României)	0	20	0
Steaua București	2016–17	Liga I	2	0	—		—		1 (Note: Appearance in UEFA Champions League)	0	—		3	0
Steaua București	2017–18	Liga I	0	0	—		—		0	0	—		0	0
Steaua București	Total		19	0	8	0	5	0	6	0	1	0	39	0
Crotone (loan)	2016–17	Serie A	0	0	—		—		—		—		0	0
Frosinone (loan)	2016–17	Serie B	0	0	—		—		—		0	0	0	0
Apollon Limassol	2017–18	Cypriot First Division	0	0	—		—		0	0	—		0	0
Viitorul Constanța	2017–18	Liga I	13	0	—		—		—		—		13	0
Viitorul Constanța	2018–19	Liga I	27	0	4	0	—		4 (Note: Appearances in UEFA Europa League)	0	—		35	0
Viitorul Constanța	2019–20	Liga I	0	0	1	0	—		0	0	0	0	1	0
Viitorul Constanța	2020–21	Liga I	30	0	0	0	—		—		2 (Note: Appearances in Liga I European play-offs)	0	32	0
Viitorul Constanța	Total		70	0	5	0	—		4	0	2	0	81	0
Voluntari (loan)	2019–20	Liga I	19	0	—		—		—		—		19	0
Dnipro-1	2021–22	Ukrainian Premier League	14	0	0	0	—		—		—		14	0
Feyenoord (loan)	2021–22	Eredivisie	0	0	—		—		0	0	—		0	0
OH Leuven	2022–23	Belgian Pro League	34	0	2	0	—		—		—		36	0
OH Leuven	2023–24	Belgian Pro League	3	0	—		—		—		—		3	0
OH Leuven	Total		37	0	2	0	—		—		—		39	0
Pogoń Szczecin (loan)	2023–24	Ekstraklasa	27	0	5	0	—		—		—		32	0
Pogoń Szczecin	2024–25	Ekstraklasa	34	0	3	0	—		—		—		37	0
Pogoń Szczecin	2025–26	Ekstraklasa	31	0	2	0	—		—		—		33	0
Pogoń Szczecin	2026–27	Ekstraklasa	12	0	1	0	—		—		—		13	0
Pogoń Szczecin	Total		77	0	6	0	—		—		—		83	0
Career total			267	0	26	0	5	0	10	0	3	0	311	0

== Honours ==
Steaua București

- Liga I: 2012–13, 2014–15
- Cupa României: 2014–15
- Supercupa României: 2013
- Cupa Ligii: 2014–15, 2015–16

Viitorul Constanța

- Cupa României: 2018–19
- Supercupa României: 2019

Feyenoord

- UEFA Europa Conference League runner-up: 2021–22

Pogoń Szczecin

- Polish Cup runner-up: 2023–24, 2024–25
