= Mandela Keita =

Belgian footballer

Personal information
- Full name: Lamine Mandela Keita
- Date of birth: 10 May 2002 (age 24)
- Place of birth: Leuven, Belgium
- Height: 1.80 m (5 ft 11 in)
- Position: Defensive midfielder

Team information
- Current team: Parma
- Number: 16

Youth career
- 2009–2021: OH Leuven

Senior career*
Years	Team	Apps	(Gls)
2021–2024	OH Leuven	35	(0)
2023	→ Royal Antwerp (loan)	17	(1)
2023–2024	→ Royal Antwerp (loan)	28	(0)
2024	Royal Antwerp	5	(0)
2024–	Parma	67	(1)

International career^{‡}
2021–2024	Belgium U21	12	(0)
2023–	Belgium	2	(0)
- * Club domestic league appearances and goals as of 25 May 2026 ‡ National team caps and goals as of 23:45, 5 October 2026 (UTC)

Lamine Mandela Keita (born 10 May 2002) is a Belgian professional footballer who plays as a defensive midfielder for Serie A club Parma and the Belgium national team.

== Club career ==
Keita debuted for OH Leuven on 21 March 2021 in the away match against KV Mechelen. Due to injury and lengthy recovery, Keita spent most of the first half of the 2022–23 season on the bench.

During the winter 2022–23 transfer window, Keita was loaned to Royal Antwerp to get more playing time, with a €10 million buy clause. At Antwerp, he played regularly and scored his first professional league goal as Antwerp became league champions for the first time in 66 years.

Keita was selected as part of the Belgium U21 squad for the 2023 UEFA European Under-21 Championship. He returned to OHL in the summer of 2023, where he had a contract until 2025. Antwerp wanted to continue with Keita and after months of negotiations, and after Keita began appearing in the OH Leuven shirt, he was loaned again to Antwerp on 10 August 2023 for a full season, again with an estimated €7–8 million buy clause.

On 30 August 2024, Keita moved to Parma in Italy.

== International career ==
Born in Belgium, Keita is of Guinean descent. He represented Guinea at youth international level, having played for the Belgium U21s.

In October 2023, he received his first call-up to the Belgium senior national team for the UEFA Euro 2024 qualifying matches against Austria and Sweden.

== Career statistics ==
=== Club ===
As of match played 10 May 2026

Appearances and goals by club, season and competition
Club	Season	League			Cup (Note: Includes Belgian Cup, Coppa Italia)		Europe		Other		Total	
Club	Season	Division	Apps	Goals	Apps	Goals	Apps	Goals	Apps	Goals	Apps	Goals
OH Leuven	2020–21	Pro League	1	0	—		—		—		1	0
OH Leuven	2021–22	Pro League	25	0	3	0	—		—		28	0
OH Leuven	2022–23	Pro League	8	0	2	0	—		—		10	0
OH Leuven	2023–24	Pro League	1	0	—		—		—		1	0
OH Leuven	Total		35	0	5	0	0	0	0	0	40	0
Royal Antwerp (loan)	2022–23	Pro League	17	1	2	0	—		—		19	1
Royal Antwerp (loan)	2023–24	Pro League	28	0	5	0	5 (Note: Appearances in UEFA Champions League)	0	—		38	0
Royal Antwerp	2024–25	Pro League	5	0	—		—		—		5	0
Royal Antwerp	Total		50	1	7	0	5	0	0	0	62	1
Parma	2024–25	Serie A	30	0	0	0	—		—		30	0
Parma	2025–26	Serie A	35	1	3	0	—		—		38	1
Parma	Total		65	1	3	0	0	0	0	0	68	1
Career total			150	2	15	0	5	0	0	0	170	2

=== International ===
As of match played 5 October 2026

Appearances and goals by national team and year
National team	Year	Apps	Goals
Belgium	2023	1	0
Belgium	2024	0	0
Belgium	2025	0	0
Belgium	2026	1	0
Total		2	0

== Honours ==
Royal Antwerp

- Belgian Pro League: 2022–23
- Belgian Cup: 2022–23
