= Sofian Kiyine =

Moroccan footballer

Personal information
- Date of birth: 2 October 1997 (age 29)
- Place of birth: Verviers, Belgium
- Height: 1.82 m (6 ft 0 in)
- Positions: Winger; attacking midfielder

Team information
- Current team: Olympic Charleroi

Youth career
- JMG Academy Lier
- –2015: Standard Liège
- 2015–2016: Chievo

Senior career*
Years	Team	Apps	(Gls)
2016–2019	Chievo	30	(0)
2017–2018	→ Salernitana (loan)	23	(2)
2019–2022	Lazio	0	(0)
2019–2020	→ Salernitana (loan)	34	(10)
2021	→ Salernitana (loan)	13	(0)
2021–2022	→ Venezia (loan)	26	(1)
2022–2024	OH Leuven	27	(2)
2024–2025	Triestina	14	(0)
2025	→ Foggia (loan)	7	(0)
2026	Stockay	12	(1)
2026–	Olympic Charleroi		

International career^{‡}
2017	Morocco U20	4	(3)
2018	Morocco U23	4	(0)
- * Club domestic league appearances and goals as of 28 June 2026 ‡ National team caps and goals as of 15:16, 1 September 2020 (UTC)

Sofian Kiyine (born 2 October 1997) is a professional footballer who plays for Belgian club Olympic Charleroi. Born in Belgium, he has represented the Morocco U20 and Morocco U23 national teams.

== Club career ==
Kiyine played for JMG Academy Lier, Standard Liège and Chievo in his youth. He made his professional debut in the Serie A for Chievo on 8 January 2017 in a game against Atalanta.

On 17 July 2019, he signed for Lazio and on the same day was sent on loan to Salernitana for the 2019–20 season. On 28 January 2021, he returned to Salernitana on another loan. On 30 August 2021, he signed on loan for Venezia, after that season Lazio sold him to OH Leuven where he signed a four-year deal until 2026.

In April 2023, he was suspended by OH Leuven after an incident in which he drove his car at high speed through the wall of a sports hall. He returned to the squad for the beginning of the 2023–24 season, before getting dropped from the squad again in October 2023.

On 26 August 2024, Kiyine's contract with OH Leuven was terminated by mutual consent. One month later, on 19 September 2024, Kiyine was announced as new player at Triestina.

== International career ==
Kiyine represented the Morocco U20 national team at the 2017 Jeux de la Francophonie, scoring the side's only goal in the final wherein they won the competition.

He is also eligible to represent Belgium and Italy, the latter because of his mother.

== Personal life ==
In late March 2023, Kiyine suffered non life-threatening injuries after he crashed his car violently while speeding at approximately 200 km/h. His vehicle jumped the sloped center of a roundabout, flew 50m through the air and through the upper wall of a sports hall, where it landed on the floor inside the building. No one else was injured in the crash. He was subsequently suspended by his club. At the end of the season, the club announced that he would be re-integrated into the squad, and that both player and club would take part in road safety programmes.

== Career statistics ==
As of match played 8 May 2022

Appearances and goals by club, season and competition
Club	Season	League			National Cup		Continental		Other		Total	
Club	Season	Division	Apps	Goals	Apps	Goals	Apps	Goals	Apps	Goals	Apps	Goals
Chievo	2016–17	Serie A	7	0	1	0	—		—		8	0
Chievo	2018–19	Serie A	23	0	2	0	—		—		25	0
Chievo	Total		30	0	3	0	0	0	0	0	33	0
Salernitana	2017–18	Serie B	23	2	0	0	—		—		23	2
Salernitana	2019–20	Serie B	34	10	2	1	—		—		36	11
Salernitana	2020–21	Serie B	13	0	0	0	—		—		13	0
Salernitana	Total		60	12	2	1	0	0	0	0	72	13
Venezia	2021–22	Serie A	25	1	2	0	—		—		27	1
Career total			125	13	7	1	0	0	0	0	132	14

== Honours ==
Morocco

- Jeux de la Francophonie gold medalist: 2017
