= Théo Chendri =

French footballer (born 1997)

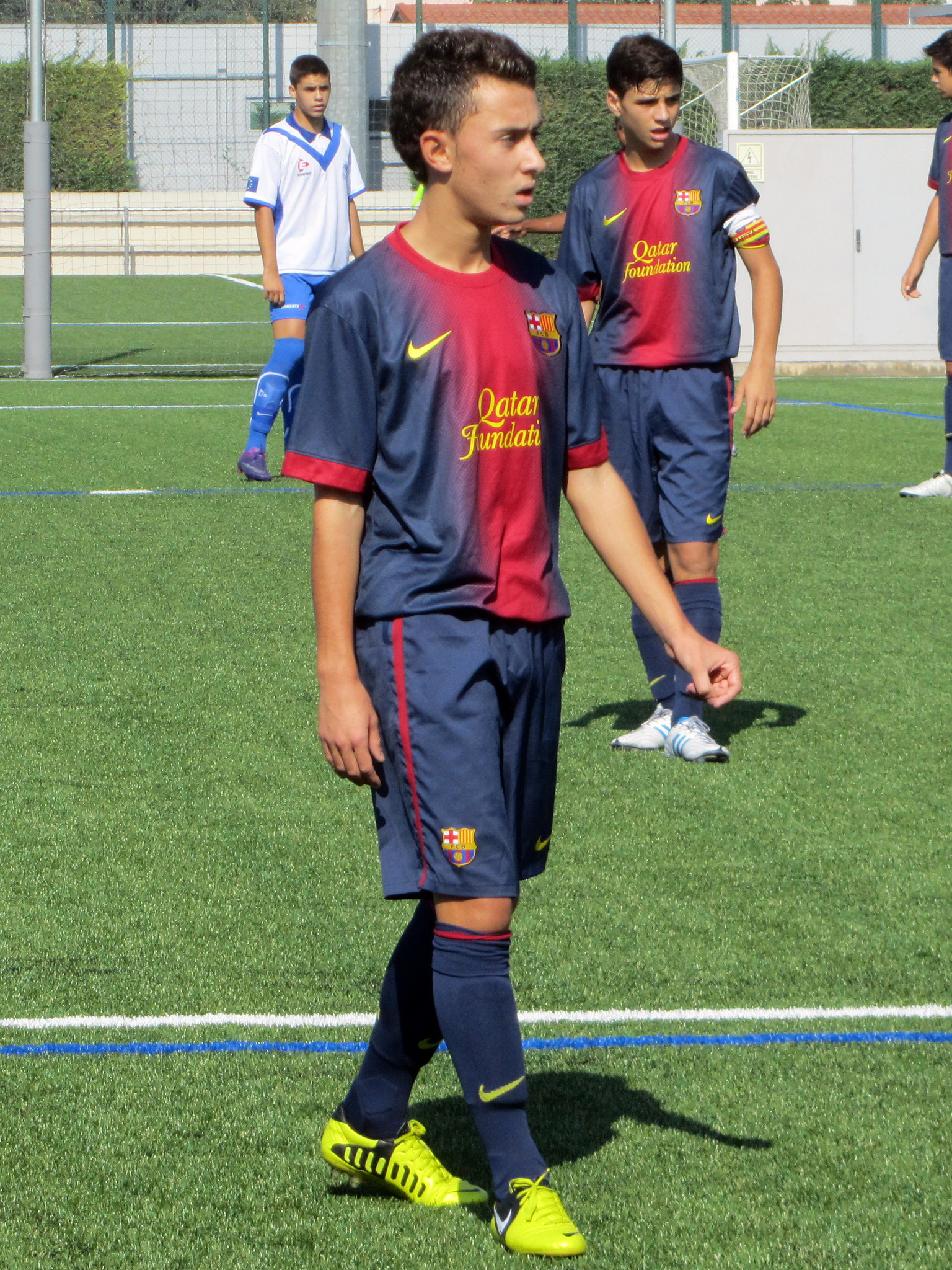
- Chendri with Barcelona

Personal information
- Date of birth: 27 May 1997 (age 29)
- Place of birth: Toulouse, France
- Height: 1.74 m (5 ft 9 in)
- Position: Midfielder

Team information
- Current team: Bassin d'Arcachon

Youth career
- 2003–2010: Et. Aussonnaise
- 2010–2012: US Colomiers
- 2012–2015: Barcelona

Senior career*
Years	Team	Apps	(Gls)
2015–2016	Barcelona B	1	(0)
2016–2019	Nantes B	39	(3)
2019–2020	Fremad Amager	25	(1)
2021–2022	Formentera	43	(1)
2022	Badajoz	13	(0)
2023	Zamora	12	(1)
2023–2025	Colomiers	19	(1)
2026	Bassin d'Arcachon	1	(0)

International career
2013–2014	France U17	7	(0)
2014–2015	France U18	8	(1)
2015	France U19	5	(0)
- * Club domestic league appearances and goals as of 17 July 2026

Théo Chendri (born 27 May 1997) is a French footballer who plays as a midfielder for Championnat National 3 club Bassin d'Arcachon.

== Club career ==
Born in Toulouse, Chendri started his career with Etoile Aussonnaise and US Colomiers, before trialling with Spanish side Barcelona in 2011. A year later, he made the move to La Masia, becoming the first Frenchman to join the prestigious academy. This deal was investigated by international body FIFA, who handed Barcelona a transfer ban, and banned Chendri from playing until he was sixteen - a decision Barcelona unsuccessfully appealed. Following this verdict, Chendri's mother gave an interview with Spanish newspaper La Vanguardia, stating that FIFA's decision was doing more harm to the young footballers concerned than the clubs who had breached the rules.

At the age of eighteen, he was promoted to the Barcelona B team, and made one appearance in the 2015–16 Segunda División B. In 2016, then-sporting director of Barcelona, Robert Fernández, asked Chendri, whose contract was set to expire, to try and convince Ousmane Dembélé to sign for La Blaugrana, but this plan failed as Dembélé joined German side Borussia Dortmund.

Chendri left Barcelona in 2016, after four years with the club. In July of the same year, he returned to France and signed a three-year deal with Nantes, being assigned to the reserve team in the Championnat de France Amateur. A year after joining Nantes, he stated his frustration in an interview with Au Premier Poteau, stating that Nantes had "sold him a bit of a dream" in terms of his progression with the club, as he had been assigned to the reserve side again.

In early 2019, he moved to Denmark to sign with second tier side Fremad Amager. Having initially settled well, his contract was terminated by mutual consent after a year and a half with the club.

Following his departure from Fremad Amager, he returned to Spain, joining Tercera División side Formentera in January 2021. He signed a one-year contract extension in July of the same year. A year later, he signed with Badajoz in the Primera Federación, alongside fellow former Barcelona B player Jesús Alfaro. However, after only half a year with Badajoz, he was released in December 2022.

Following his release from Badajoz, he joined Segunda Federación side Zamora on 26 January 2023.

== International career ==
Chendri is eligible to represent both France and Algeria at international level. He has represented France from under-17 to under-19 level.

== Career statistics ==
=== Club ===
As of 17 July 2026

Appearances and goals by club, season and competition
Club	Season	League			Cup (Note: Includes the Copa del Rey, Coupe de France and Danish Cup)		Other		Total	
Club	Season	Division	Apps	Goals	Apps	Goals	Apps	Goals	Apps	Goals
Barcelona B	2015–16	Segunda División B	1	0	–		0	0	1	0
Nantes B	2016–17	CFA	8	0	–		0	0	8	0
Nantes B	2017–18	Championnat National 3	20	2	–		0	0	20	2
Nantes B	2018–19	Championnat National 2	11	1	–		0	0	11	1
Nantes B	Total		39	3	0	0	0	0	39	3
Fremad Amager	2018–19	Danish 1st Division	10	1	0	0	0	0	10	1
Fremad Amager	2019–20	Danish 1st Division	15	0	3	0	0	0	18	0
Fremad Amager	Total		25	1	3	0	0	0	28	1
Formentera	2020–21	Tercera División	14	0	0	0	0	0	14	0
Formentera	2021–22	Segunda División RFEF	29	1	0	0	0	0	29	1
Formentera	Total		43	1	0	0	0	0	43	1
Badajoz	2022–23	Primera Federación	13	0	0	0	0	0	13	0
Zamora	2022–23	Segunda Federación	12	1	0	0	2 (Note: Appearances in the 2023 Segunda Federación play-offs)	0	14	1
Colomiers	2023–24	Championnat National 3	2	0	0	0	0	0	2	0
Colomiers	2024–25	Championnat National 3	17	1	2	0	0	0	19	1
Colomiers	Total		19	1	2	0	0	0	21	1
Bassin d'Arcachon	2025–26	Championnat National 3	1	0	0	0	0	0	1	0
Career total			153	7	5	0	2	0	160	7
