= Franck Idumbo-Muzambo =

Belgian footballer

Personal information
- Date of birth: 23 June 2002 (age 24)
- Height: 1.73 m (5 ft 8 in)
- Positions: Forward; winger

Team information
- Current team: Ústí nad Labem
- Number: 23

Youth career
- FC Cuesmes
- Mons
- –2017: Club Brugge
- 2017–2021: Gent
- 2022: Mechelen

Senior career*
Years	Team	Apps	(Gls)
2022–2025	OH Leuven U23	53	(23)
2023–2025	OH Leuven	1	(0)
2025–	Ústí nad Labem	19	(4)

International career
2017	Belgium U15	3	(2)
2017–2018	Belgium U16	12	(1)
2018–2019	Belgium U17	15	(4)
2019	Belgium U18	2	(0)
- * Club domestic league appearances and goals as of 29 April 2026

Franck Idumbo-Muzambo (born 23 June 2002) is a Belgian professional footballer who plays as a forward or a winger for Ústí nad Labem in the Czech National Football League.

== Club career ==
Idumbo-Muzambo made his debut for OH Leuven on 10 April 2023 when he was subbed on for Nathan Opoku with about 20 minutes to play in a home match against Mechelen.

On 25 August 2025, Idumbo-Muzambo signed a one-year contract with Czech National Football League club Ústí nad Labem with an option for another year. End of November 2025, Idumbo-Muzambo extended his contract by signing for another two seasons, until the summer of 2028.

== International career ==
Born in Belgium, Idumbo-Muzambo is of the Democratic Republic of the Congo descent. He is a youth international for Belgium, having played up to the Belgium U18s.
