= Jo Gilis =

Belgian footballer

Personal information
- Date of birth: 5 February 2000 (age 26)
- Height: 1.73 m (5 ft 8 in)
- Positions: Attacking midfielder; winger

Team information
- Current team: Houtvenne
- Number: 18

Youth career
- –2018: OH Leuven

Senior career*
Years	Team	Apps	(Gls)
2018–2024	OH Leuven	9	(0)
2019	→ Eendracht Aalst (loan)	10	(1)
2020–2021	→ Lierse Kempenzonen (loan)	24	(3)
2021	→ Heist (loan)	9	(1)
2022–2024	OH Leuven U23	52	(15)
2024–	Houtvenne	47	(11)

International career
2016	Belgium U16	2	(1)
2016–2017	Belgium U17	9	(4)
- * Club domestic league appearances and goals as of 3 May 2026

Jo Gilis (born 5 February 2000) is a Belgian professional footballer who plays as an attacking midfielder or a winger for Houtvenne.

== Club career ==
Gilis played his first match for OH Leuven on 14 April 2018, coming on as a substitute for Nikola Storm in a 0–2 win at Waasland-Beveren.

== Personal life ==
Gilis has two older sisters, Nele Coll (née Gilis) and Tinne Gilis, who are both professional squash players representing Belgium.
