= Dylan Ouédraogo =

Footballer (born 1998)

Personal information
- Full name: Dylan Louis Ange Ouédraogo
- Date of birth: 22 July 1998 (age 28)
- Place of birth: Marseille, France
- Height: 1.85 m (6 ft 1 in)
- Positions: Centre back; left back

Team information
- Current team: Kravasa
- Number: 15

Youth career
- 2015–2018: Monaco

Senior career*
Years	Team	Apps	(Gls)
2016–2018	Monaco II	23	(0)
2018–2019	Apollon Limassol	17	(0)
2019–2023	OH Leuven	38	(0)
2023–2024	Stade Lausanne Ouchy	13	(0)
2024–2026	AEL Limassol	30	(2)
2026-	Kravasa	3	(0)

International career^{‡}
2017–	Burkina Faso	2	(0)
- * Club domestic league appearances and goals as of 14 June 2026 ‡ National team caps and goals as of 17 February 2021

Dylan Louis Ange Ouédraogo (born 22 July 1998) is a professional footballer who plays as a centre back or a left back. Born in France, he plays for the Burkina Faso national team.

== Club career ==
A youth product of Monaco, Ouédraogo signed with the Cypriot club Apollon Limassol on 4 August 2018.

== International career ==
Ouédraogo was born in France and is Burkinabé by descent. He debuted for the Burkina Faso national team in a 2–0 friendly loss to Morocco on 24 March 2017.
