= Casper De Norre =

Belgian footballer

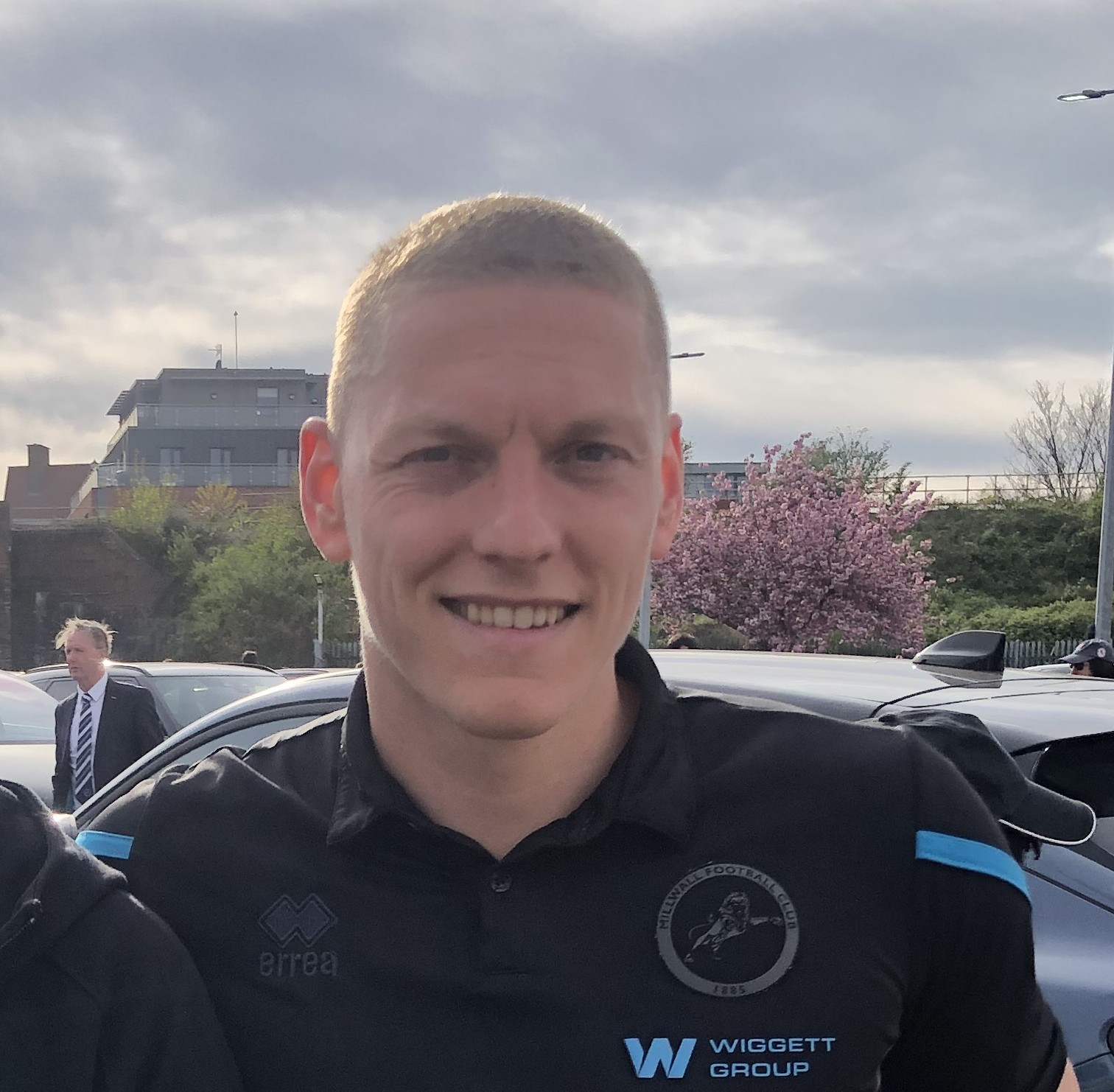
- Casper De Norre in 2025.

Personal information
- Full name: Casper De Norre
- Date of birth: 7 February 1997 (age 29)
- Place of birth: Hasselt, Belgium
- Height: 1.75 m (5 ft 9 in)
- Positions: Defensive midfielder; right back

Team information
- Current team: Millwall
- Number: 24

Youth career
- Genk
- 2013–2015: Standard Liège

Senior career*
Years	Team	Apps	(Gls)
2015–2018	Sint-Truiden	57	(2)
2016–2017	→ ASV Geel (loan)	30	(11)
2019–2021	Genk	24	(0)
2020–2021	→ OH Leuven (loan)	23	(1)
2021–2023	OH Leuven	67	(6)
2023–	Millwall	111	(5)

International career^{‡}
2013–2014	Belgium U17	6	(0)
2018–2019	Belgium U21	8	(0)
- * Club domestic league appearances and goals as of 15:03, 2 November 2026 (UTC) ‡ National team caps and goals as of 27 February 2023

Casper De Norre (born 7 February 1997) is a Belgian professional footballer who plays as a defensive midfielder or a right back for EFL Championship side Millwall.

== Club career ==
De Norre started his career with Sint-Truiden.

On 4 January 2019, De Norre returned to his former youth club, K.R.C. Genk, on a 4.5-year contract.

He signed a four-year deal with Millwall in July 2023.

== Career statistics ==
As of match played 2 November 2026

Appearances and goals by club, season and competition
Club	Season	League			National Cup (Note: Includes Belgian Cup, FA Cup)		League Cup (Note: Includes EFL Cup)		Other		Total	
Club	Season	Division	Apps	Goals	Apps	Goals	Apps	Goals	Apps	Goals	Apps	Goals
Sint-Truiden	2015–16	Belgian Pro League	2	0	0	0	—		—		2	0
Sint-Truiden	2016–17	Belgian Pro League	0	0	0	0	—		—		0	0
Sint-Truiden	2017–18	Belgian First Division A	36	0	1	0	—		—		37	0
Sint-Truiden	2018–19	Belgian First Division A	19	2	3	1	—		—		22	3
Sint-Truiden	Total		57	2	4	1	—		—		61	3
ASV Geel (loan)	2016–17	Belgian First Amateur Division	30	11	3	0	—		—		33	11
Genk	2018–19	Belgian First Division A	11	0	0	0	—		2 (Note: Appearances in UEFA Europa League)	0	13	0
Genk	2019–20	Belgian First Division A	13	0	2	0	—		3 (Note: Appearances in UEFA Champions League)	0	18	0
Genk	Total		24	0	2	0	—		5	0	31	0
OH Leuven	2020–21	Belgian First Division A	23	1	2	0	—		—		25	1
OH Leuven	2021–22	Belgian First Division A	33	2	2	1	—		—		35	3
OH Leuven	2022–23	Belgian First Division A	34	4	2	1	—		—		36	5
OH Leuven	Total		90	7	6	2	—		—		96	9
Millwall	2023–24	EFL Championship	32	1	0	0	0	0	—		32	1
Millwall	2024–25	EFL Championship	46	3	3	1	2	0	—		51	4
Millwall	2025–26	EFL Championship	29	1	0	0	1	0	2 (Note: Appearances in EFL Championship play-offs)	0	32	1
Millwall	2026–27	EFL Championship	4	0	0	0	1	0	—		5	0
Millwall	Total		111	5	3	1	4	0	2	0	120	6
Career total			312	25	18	4	4	0	7	0	341	29

== Honours ==
Genk

- Belgian First Division Winner: 2018–19
