= Pierre-Yves Ngawa =

Belgian footballer

Personal information
- Date of birth: 9 February 1992 (age 34)
- Place of birth: Liège, Belgium
- Height: 1.87 m (6 ft 1 1/2 in)
- Position: Centre back

Team information
- Current team: RFC Liège
- Number: 5

Youth career
- Montegnée

Senior career*
Years	Team	Apps	(Gls)
2011–2014	Standard Liège	0	(0)
2011–2013	→ Sint-Truiden (loan)	49	(2)
2013–2014	→ Újpest (loan)	20	(0)
2014–2015	Lierse	20	(2)
2015–2017	OH Leuven	52	(1)
2017–2018	Avellino	34	(0)
2018–2019	Perugia	14	(0)
2019	→ Foggia (loan)	5	(0)
2019–2024	OH Leuven	75	(1)
2023–2024	OH Leuven U23	10	(0)
2024–	RFC Liège	59	(3)

International career
2007	Belgium U15	3	(0)
2010	Belgium U18	5	(0)
2010–2011	Belgium U19	18	(2)
2011–2014	Belgium U21	9	(1)
- * Club domestic league appearances and goals as of 19 April 2026

Pierre-Yves Ngawa (born 9 February 1992) is a Belgian footballer who currently plays for RFC Liège in the Challenger Pro League.

== Career ==
Ngawa started his professional career with Standard Liège, but was immediately loaned out to Sint-Truiden. After a disappointing season, Sint-Truiden relegated to the Belgian Second Division, but the loan deal was extended for another season and Ngawa enjoyed promotion back to the Belgian Pro League as Sint-Truiden became champions in the second division. Ngawa then returned to Standard Liège and during the buildup of the season he received his first start in the Europa League qualifying phase against Skoda Xanthi. Nevertheless, he was loaned to Újpest where he featured regularly and even won the 2013–14 Magyar Kupa including playing the full 120 minutes during the final. Ngawa then came back to Belgium as he signed for Lierse, with whom he suffered relegation to the Belgian Second Division again. Newly promoted OH Leuven offered him a contract in 2015, allowing him to stay in the Belgian Pro League for one season before relegating yet again. Ngawa thereafter featured regularly at the second level in the 2017–18 Belgian First Division B with OH Leuven, before moving to Serie B team Avellino in the summer of 2017. On 31 January 2019, Ngawa joined on loan to Foggia with an obligation to buy.

== Honours ==
Újpest

- Hungarian Cup (1): 2013–14
