= 2026–27 Oud-Heverlee Leuven season =

Oud-Heverlee Leuven
2026–27 season
- Manager: Timmy Simons (until 17 November 2026); Jamath Shoffner (caretaker since 17 November 2026)
- Stadium: Den Dreef

The 2026–27 season is the 25th season in the history of the Oud-Heverlee Leuven, and the club's seventh consecutive season in the Belgian Pro League.

== Players ==
- This section lists players who were in Oud-Heveree Leuven's first-team squad at any point during the 2026–27 season and appeared at least once on the match sheet (possibly as unused substitute)
- The symbol ℒ indicates a player who is on loan from another club
- The symbol ¥ indicates a youngster, mostly playing for OH Leuven U23

No.	Nationality	Name	Position	Joined First Team	Previous club	Left First Team
Goalkeepers
1	(Belgium)	Tobe Leysen	GK	19 August 2023	(Belgium) Genk	3 September 2026
1 & 16 (Note: During the first four matchdays, Van den Heuvel wore shirt number 16, but switched to number 1 following the departure of Tobe Leysen to Genk, taking over his shirt number.)	(Netherlands)	Dani van den Heuvel	GK	Summer 2026	(Belgium) Club Brugge	–
13	(Belgium)	Kiany Vroman	GK	3 September 2026	(Belgium) Lierse	–
61	(Belgium)	Owen Jochmans^{¥}	GK	Summer 2024	Youth Squad	–
Defenders
3	(Belgium)	Noë Dussenne	CB	19 August 2025	(Switzerland) Lausanne-Sport	–
5	(Germany)	Jamie Lawrence	CB	20 July 2026	(Austria) WSG Tirol	–
26	(Japan)	Takuya Ogiwara^{ℒ}	LB	16 July 2026	(Japan) Urawa Red Diamonds	(30 June 2027)
27	(Spain)	Óscar Gil	RB	1 August 2024	(Spain) Espanyol	–
28	(Belgium)	Ewoud Pletinckx	CB	17 June 2022	(Belgium) Zulte Waregem	–
30	(Italy)	Alessandro Fontanarosa^{ℒ}	CB	3 September 2026	Avellino	(30 June 2027)
34	(Switzerland) / (Togo)	Roggerio Nyakossi	CB / DM	27 January 2025	Marseille	–
77	(Belgium)	Thibault Vlietinck	RB / RW	12 August 2020	(Belgium) Club Brugge	–
99	(Belgium)	Davis Opoku	RB / RW	Playoffs 2024	Youth Squad	–
Midfielders
4	(Belgium)	Birger Verstraete	DM	10 July 2024	(Greece) Aris	–
6	(Belgium)	Wouter George	CM	Summer 2024	Youth Squad	–
8	(Belgium)	Siebe Schrijvers	AM / CF	15 January 2021	(Belgium) Club Brugge	–
11	(Germany) / (Eritrea)	Henok Teklab	LW	5 September 2025	(Belgium) Union SG	–
24	(Poland)	Łukasz Łakomy	CM / DM / AM	25 August 2025	(Switzerland) Young Boys	–
48	(United States) / (Cameroon)	Bryang Kayo	CM	26 June 2025	(Germany) Osnabrück	–
72	(Belgium)	Sebastian Murru^{¥}	CM	Summer 2025	Youth Squad	–
80	(Belgium)	Matteo Heremans^{¥}	AM / CM	Spring 2026	Youth Squad	–
Forwards
7	(Ghana)	Emmanuel Addai	CF	27 July 2026	Qarabağ	–
9	(Guinea)	Abdoul Karim Traoré	CF	8 July 2025	(France) Bourg-Péronnas	–
17	(Belgium)	Kyan Vaesen	CF	2 February 2026	(Belgium) Westerlo	–
18	(Belgium)	Robin Mirisola^{ℒ}	CF	3 September 2026	Genk	(30 June 2027)
19	(Nigeria)	Chukwubuikem Ikwuemesi	CF	24 July 2024	Salernitana	–
20	(Japan)	Shin Yamada^{ℒ}	CF	14 July 2026	(Scotland) Celtic	(30 June 2027)
21	(Democratic Republic of the Congo) / (Belgium)	William Balikwisha	AM / RW / LW	20 July 2024	Standard Liège	–

=== Did not appear on match sheet ===
The following players are/were listed as part of Oud-Heverlee Leuven's first-team squad during (part of) the 2026–27 season, but have not appeared on the match sheet

No.	Nationality	Name	Position	Joined First Team	Previous club	Left First Team	Note
10	(Belgium)	Thibaud Verlinden	LW	4 February 2025	Beerschot	–	Injured during pre-season and out for several months
15	(Croatia)	Viktor Damjanić^{¥}	CB	23 July 2025	(Serbia) Jedinstvo Ub	–	Listed as A-squad but has not appeared yet
25	(Belgium)	Manuel Osifo	DM / CB	1 February 2024	(Belgium) Oostende	–	Listed as A-squad but has not appeared yet
42	(Turkey) / (Belgium)	Hasan Bulut^{¥}	AM / CM	Spring 2026	Youth Squad	–	Listed as A-squad but has not appeared yet
63	(Belgium)	Christ Souanga^{¥}	LB	Winter 2023–24	Youth Squad	–	Listed as A-squad but has not appeared yet
81	(Belgium)	Marcel Van Dijck^{¥}	GK	Summer 2026	Youth Squad	–	Listed as A-squad but has not appeared yet
89	(Belgium) / (Nigeria)	Chike Van De Ven^{¥}	CF	Fall 2024	Youth Squad	–	Listed as A-squad but has not appeared yet

== Transfers ==
=== Transfers in ===
Date	Position	Nationality	Name	From	Fee	Ref.
3 June 2026	MF	(Poland)	Łukasz Łakomy	Young Boys	Buy Clause Activated	
12 June 2026	GK	(Netherlands)	Dani van den Heuvel	Club Brugge	Free	
End of the 2025–26 season	MF	(Belgium)	Manuel Osifo	Kortrijk	Loan Return	
14 July 2026	FW	(Japan)	Shin Yamada	Celtic	Loan	
16 July 2026	DF	(Japan)	Takuya Ogiwara	Urawa Red Diamonds	Loan	
20 July 2026	DF	(Germany)	Jamie Lawrence	(Austria) WSG Tirol	Free	
27 July 2026	MF	(Ghana)	Emmanuel Addai	(Azerbaijan) Qarabağ	Free	
3 September 2026	GK	(Belgium)	Kiany Vroman	(Belgium) Lierse	Undisclosed	
3 September 2026	FW	(Belgium)	Robin Mirisola	(Belgium) Genk	Loan	
3 September 2026	DF	(Italy)	Alessandro Fontanarosa	(Italy) Avellino	Loan	

=== Transfers out ===
Date Announced	Position	Nationality	Name	To	Fee	Ref.
24 May 2026	DF	(Belgium)	Roméo Monticelli	Francs Borains	Free	
4 June 2026	MF	(Finland)	Casper Terho	Sparta Rotterdam	Undisclosed	
17 June 2026	DF	(Japan)	Takuma Ominami	V-Varen Nagasaki	Undisclosed	
26 June 2026	GK	(Belgium)	Théo Radelet	La Louvière	Undisclosed	
End of 2025–26 season	MF	(Belgium)	Mathieu Maertens	Cambuur	Free	
End of 2025–26 season	MF	(France)	Youssef Maziz	Colorado Rapids	Free	
End of 2025–26 season	GK	(France)	Maxence Prévot	Dunkerque	Free	
8 July 2026	FW	(Guinea)	Sory Kaba	Al Dhafra	Undisclosed	
9 July 2026	DF	(Japan)	Takahiro Akimoto	Machida Zelvia	Undisclosed	
3 September 2026	GK	(Belgium)	Tobe Leysen	(Belgium) Genk	Undisclosed	

== Pre-season and Friendlies ==
OH Leuven started the preparation for the new season on 26 June 2026, and released the friendly schedule, which involved opening matches at home against Crossing Schaerbeek and in the Netherlands against Olympiacos, two friendlies behind closed doors (against Lommel and Lierse), and a "galamatch" against French giants Lille. The pre-season training camp was held in the Netherlands from 20 to 25 July 2026, which concluded with a friendly against Heerenveen. Later, a pre-season friendly against Virton was also added to the schedule.

OH Leuven played a friendly against Union SG three weeks into the season, as both teams had seen their matchday three fixture postponed due to their opponents playing in the qualifiers for the UEFA Conference League (Gent) and UEFA Europa League (Sint-Truiden) respectively.

4 July 2026 Friendly	OH Leuven (Belgium)	7–0	(Belgium) Crossing Schaerbeek	Oud-Heverlee
11:00	Vaesen; Pletinckx; Opoku; Damjanić; Balikwisha; Schrijvers (pen.)	Report		Stadium: Banqup Campus

11 July 2026 Friendly	Olympiacos (Greece)	1–1	(Belgium) OH Leuven	Vlaardingen
14:00	Luiz 68'	Report	Murru 87'	Stadium: Nieuwelandt

15 July 2026 Friendly	OH Leuven (Belgium)	5–1	(Belgium) Lommel	Oud-Heverlee
11:00	Traoré 5'; Ikwuemesi; Schrijvers (pen.); Balikwisha; Vlietinck	Report	Seuntjens 25'	Stadium: Banqup Campus; Attendance: 0
Note: Game was played in 3 halves of 30 minutes.

18 July 2026 Friendly	OH Leuven (Belgium)	1–0	(Belgium) Lierse	Oud-Heverlee
11:00	Traoré 40'	Report		Stadium: Banqup Campus; Attendance: 0
Note: Game was played in 2 halves of 60 minutes.

25 July 2026 Friendly	Heerenveen (Netherlands)	4–4	(Belgium) OH Leuven	Oldebroek
13:00	Trenskow 32', 40', 67'; Vente 60'	Report	Ikwuemesi 12', 14'; Traoré 50'; Balikwisha 58'	Stadium: Sportpark Bovenmolen
Note: After conclusion of the friendly match between Heerenveen and OH Leuven, which ended in a 4–4 draw, two squads of reserves and U23 players played a "third half" of another 45 minutes, which Heerenveen won 2-0. While Heerenveen reported the result as a 4–4 draw, OH Leuven included the 2 goals and reported the game as 6–4 in favor of Heerenveen.

29 July 2026 Friendly	OH Leuven (Belgium)	2–1	(Belgium) Virton	Oud-Heverlee
11:00	Vaesen; Dussenne	Report	Arib	Stadium: Banqup Campus

1 August 2026 Friendly	OH Leuven (Belgium)	3–6	(France) Lille	Leuven
17:00	Ikwuemesi 31' (pen.), 48'; Balikwisha 45+2'	Report	Santos 16'; Giroud 45+5'; Önal 56'; Mbappé 68', 88'; Diaoune 73'	Stadium: Den Dreef

21 August 2026 Friendly	Union SG (Belgium)	6–3	(Belgium) OH Leuven	Zaventem
	Schoofs 22'; Keita 66'; Biondic 131', 133', 137'; Fuseini 140'	Report	Murru 37'; George 113'; Ikwuemesi 117'
Note: Game was played in 2 halves of 75 minutes.

2 October 2026 Friendly	OH Leuven (Belgium)	6–2 or 7–2	(Netherlands) Willem II	Oud-Heverlee
13:00		Report		Stadium: Banqup Campus; Attendance: 0
Note: Game was played in 4 halves of 30 minutes. The game was played between closed doors, no information was given on lineups and goalscorers. OH Leuven reported the game as finishing 7–2, while Dutch websites are stating 6–2 as the final score.

== Competitions ==
=== Overall record ===
Competition	First match	Last match	Starting round	Record							
Competition	First match	Last match	Starting round	Pld	W	D	L	GF	GA	GD	Win %
Belgian Pro League	8 August 2026	May 2027	Matchday 1	11	3	3	5	12	17	−5	27.27
Belgian Cup	17 October 2026		Seventh round	1	1	0	0	1	0	+1	100.00
Total				12	4	3	5	13	17	−4	33.33

Source: Soccerway

=== Pro League ===
==== League Table ====
Pos	Team	Pld	W	D	L	GF	GA	GD	Pts
8	Standard Liège	11	4	3	4	18	16	+2	15
9	Westerlo	11	4	2	5	26	30	−4	14
10	OH Leuven	11	3	3	5	12	17	−5	12
11	Mechelen	11	3	3	5	13	20	−7	12
12	Sint-Truiden	11	3	2	6	22	22	0	11

Updated to match(es) played on 8 November 2026. Source: Jupiler Pro League (in Dutch)
Rules for classification: 1) Points; 2) Matches won; 3) Goal difference; 4) Goals scored; 5) Away matches won; 6) Away goal difference; 7) Away goals scored; 8) Play-off.

==== Results summary ====
Overall								Home						Away					
Pld	W	D	L	GF	GA	GD	Pts	W	D	L	GF	GA	GD	W	D	L	GF	GA	GD
11	3	3	5	12	17	−5	12	2	2	2	8	8	0	1	1	3	4	9	−5

Source: Jupiler Pro League Ranking

==== Results by round ====
Round	1	2	4	3	5	6	7	8	9	10	11	12	13	14	15	16	17	18	19	20	21	22	23	24	25	26	27	28	29	30	31	32	33	34
Ground	A	H	H	A	A	H	H	A	H	A	H	A	H	A	A	H	A	H	A	H	A	H	A	H	A	H	H	A	A	H	A	H	A	H
Result	L	L	L	L	L	D	W	D	D	W	W																							
Position	15	17	17	17	17	17	15	15	16	13	10																							
Points	0	0	0	0	0	1	4	5	6	9	12																							

Updated to match(es) played on 8 November 2026. Source: Jupiler Pro League
A = Away; H = Home; W = Win; D = Draw; L = Loss; = Champions League league phase; = Champions League third qualifying round; = Europa League second qualifying round; = Conference League second qualifying round; = Challenger Pro League

==== Score overview ====
Key: OH Leuven goals shown first.

Opposition	Home score	Away score	Aggregate score	Double
Anderlecht	5/6/7 February 2027	22 November 2026		
Antwerp	19/20/21 February 2027	18 December 2026		
Beveren	23/24/25 April 2027	0–3		No
Cercle Brugge	1–1	26/27/28 February 2027		No
Charleroi	7/8/9 May 2027	1–3		No
Club Brugge	0–3	9/10/11 April 2027		No
Genk	5/6/7 March 2027	11 December 2026		
Gent	21/22/23 May 2027	0–1		No
Kortrijk	27 November 2026	12/13/14 March 2027		
La Louvière	2–0	12/13/14 February 2027		
Lommel	2–2	29/30/31 January 2027		No
Mechelen	2–0	14/15/16 May 2027		
Sint-Truiden	22/23/24 January 2027	2–1		
Standard Liège	1–2	16/17/18 April 2027		No
Union SG	19/20/21 March 2027	1–1		No
Westerlo	26 December 2026	30 April-1/2 May 2027		
Zulte Waregem	2/3/4 April 2027	17 January 2027		

==== Matches ====
The match schedule was released on 18 June 2026.

2026–27 Belgian Pro League
Match Details	Home team	Result	Away team	Lineup	Unused Subs	Bookings
8 August 2026; 16:00; Stade du Pays de Charleroi; Charleroi	Charleroi	3–1	Oud-Heverlee Leuven	Van den Heuvel; Nyakossi, Pletinckx, Dussenne; Teklab (64' Ogiwara), Schrijvers, George (70' Łakomy), Gil (64' Opoku); Traoré, Ikwuemesi (76' Yamada), Balikwisha (76' Vaesen)	Leysen; Kayo; Lawrence; Verstraete	(yellow card) 20' Traoré; (red card) 30' Traoré; (yellow card) 45' Ikwuemesi
8 August 2026; 16:00; Stade du Pays de Charleroi; Charleroi	24' Guiagon (pen.) 59' Van Den Kerkhof (without assist); 79' Mbembe (Cissé)	1–0; 1–1; 2–1; 3–1	39' Gil (George)	Van den Heuvel; Nyakossi, Pletinckx, Dussenne; Teklab (64' Ogiwara), Schrijvers, George (70' Łakomy), Gil (64' Opoku); Traoré, Ikwuemesi (76' Yamada), Balikwisha (76' Vaesen)	Leysen; Kayo; Lawrence; Verstraete	(yellow card) 20' Traoré; (red card) 30' Traoré; (yellow card) 45' Ikwuemesi
15 August 2026; 20:45; Den Dreef; Leuven	Oud-Heverlee Leuven	0–3	Club Brugge	Van den Heuvel; Nyakossi (86' Kayo), Pletinckx, Dussenne (75' Ogiwara); Teklab (17' Opoku), Schrijvers, George, Gil; Balikwisha, Ikwuemesi (75' Yamada), Vaesen (75' Łakomy)	Leysen; Heremans; Murru; Verstraete	
15 August 2026; 20:45; Den Dreef; Leuven		0–1; 0–2; 0–3	26' Diakhon (Forbs); 60' Mechele (Diakhon); 83' Tresoldi (Lemaréchal)	Van den Heuvel; Nyakossi (86' Kayo), Pletinckx, Dussenne (75' Ogiwara); Teklab (17' Opoku), Schrijvers, George, Gil; Balikwisha, Ikwuemesi (75' Yamada), Vaesen (75' Łakomy)	Leysen; Heremans; Murru; Verstraete	
29 August 2026; 20:45; Den Dreef; Leuven	Oud-Heverlee Leuven	1–2	Standard Liège	Van den Heuvel; Nyakossi (86' Vaesen), Pletinckx, Dussenne; Balikwisha (86' Yamada), Verstraete (86' Łakomy), George, Schrijvers, Gil; Traoré (58' Opoku), Ikwuemesi	Leysen; Heremans; Kayo; Lawrence; Murru	(yellow card) 51' Nyakossi; (yellow card) 90+1' (yellow-red card) 90+4' Schrijvers
29 August 2026; 20:45; Den Dreef; Leuven	66' George (Ikwuemesi)	0–1; 1–1; 1–2	9' Nielsen (pen.) 68' Eckert (Abid)	Van den Heuvel; Nyakossi (86' Vaesen), Pletinckx, Dussenne; Balikwisha (86' Yamada), Verstraete (86' Łakomy), George, Schrijvers, Gil; Traoré (58' Opoku), Ikwuemesi	Leysen; Heremans; Kayo; Lawrence; Murru	(yellow card) 51' Nyakossi; (yellow card) 90+1' (yellow-red card) 90+4' Schrijvers
3 September 2026 (Note: The match between Gent and OH Leuven, initially scheduled to be played on 22 August (20:45), was postponed due to the participation of Gent in the UEFA Conference League qualifying rounds.); 20:30; Planet Group Arena; Gent	Gent	1–0	Oud-Heverlee Leuven	Van den Heuvel; Dussenne (76' Ogiwara), Pletinckx, Lawrence; Opoku (57' Traoré), Verstraete, George (76' Kayo), Gil; Balikwisha, Yamada (67' Ikwuemesi), Łakomy (67' Vaesen)	Jochmans; Heremans; Murru; Nyakossi	(yellow card) 58' George; (yellow card) 76' Gil
3 September 2026; 20:30; Planet Group Arena; Gent	46' Araújo (without assist)	1–0		Van den Heuvel; Dussenne (76' Ogiwara), Pletinckx, Lawrence; Opoku (57' Traoré), Verstraete, George (76' Kayo), Gil; Balikwisha, Yamada (67' Ikwuemesi), Łakomy (67' Vaesen)	Jochmans; Heremans; Murru; Nyakossi	(yellow card) 58' George; (yellow card) 76' Gil
6 September 2026; 19:15; Freethiel Stadion; Beveren	Beveren	3–0	Oud-Heverlee Leuven	Van den Heuvel; Dussenne, Pletinckx, Lawrence; Ogiwara (56' Traoré), Verstraete, Schrijvers, George (87' Vaesen), Gil (72' Opoku); Yamada (72' Balikwisha), Ikwuemesi (72' Mirisola)	Jochmans; Kayo; Łakomy; Nyakossi	(yellow card) 68' Lawrence; (yellow card) 79' Verstraete
6 September 2026; 19:15; Freethiel Stadion; Beveren	69' Lokesa (Margaritha); 85' Margaritha (Verschueren); 90+1' Kaboré (Thompson)	1–0; 2–0; 3–0		Van den Heuvel; Dussenne, Pletinckx, Lawrence; Ogiwara (56' Traoré), Verstraete, Schrijvers, George (87' Vaesen), Gil (72' Opoku); Yamada (72' Balikwisha), Ikwuemesi (72' Mirisola)	Jochmans; Kayo; Łakomy; Nyakossi	(yellow card) 68' Lawrence; (yellow card) 79' Verstraete
12 September 2026; 20:45; Den Dreef; Leuven	Oud-Heverlee Leuven	1–1	Cercle Brugge	Van den Heuvel; Dussenne, Nyakossi, Lawrence; Opoku, George, Verstraete, Gil; Schrijvers (70' Balikwisha), Mirisola (90' Vaesen), Traoré (70' Yamada)	Jochmans; Fontanarosa; Ikwuemesi; Łakomy; Ogiwara; Teklab	(yellow card) 48' Schrijvers; (yellow card) 90+5' Gil; (yellow card) 90+5' Verstraete; (yellow card) 90+5' Vaesen
12 September 2026; 20:45; Den Dreef; Leuven	25' Opoku (Schrijvers)	1–0; 1–1	90+6' Kouassi (pen.)	Van den Heuvel; Dussenne, Nyakossi, Lawrence; Opoku, George, Verstraete, Gil; Schrijvers (70' Balikwisha), Mirisola (90' Vaesen), Traoré (70' Yamada)	Jochmans; Fontanarosa; Ikwuemesi; Łakomy; Ogiwara; Teklab	(yellow card) 48' Schrijvers; (yellow card) 90+5' Gil; (yellow card) 90+5' Verstraete; (yellow card) 90+5' Vaesen
19 September 2026; 16:00; Den Dreef; Leuven	Oud-Heverlee Leuven	2–0	La Louvière	Van den Heuvel; Lawrence, Nyakossi (78' Pletinckx), Dussenne; Opoku (90' Ogiwara), Verstraete, George (78' Łakomy), Schrijvers, Gil (90' Teklab); Mirisola, Traoré (68' Balikwisha)	Jochmans; Addai; Ikwuemesi; Yamada	(yellow card) 51' George; (yellow card) 73' Verstraete; (yellow card) 78' Pletinckx
19 September 2026; 16:00; Den Dreef; Leuven	32' George (Traoré); 89' Balikwisha (Opoku)	1–0; 2–0		Van den Heuvel; Lawrence, Nyakossi (78' Pletinckx), Dussenne; Opoku (90' Ogiwara), Verstraete, George (78' Łakomy), Schrijvers, Gil (90' Teklab); Mirisola, Traoré (68' Balikwisha)	Jochmans; Addai; Ikwuemesi; Yamada	(yellow card) 51' George; (yellow card) 73' Verstraete; (yellow card) 78' Pletinckx
11 October 2026; 16:00; Joseph Marien Stadium; Forest, Brussels	Union SG	1–1	Oud-Heverlee Leuven	Vroman; Dussenne, Nyakossi, Lawrence; Opoku (85' Ogiwara), Schrijvers (85' Pletinckx), George (85' Vaesen), Gil; Balikwisha, Mirisola (72' Ikwuemesi), Łakomy (69' Verstraete)	Jochmans; Addai; Fontanarosa; Murru	(yellow card) 6' Balikwisha; (yellow card) 42' Lawrence; (yellow card) 43' Gil
11 October 2026; 16:00; Joseph Marien Stadium; Forest, Brussels	66' Opoku (o.g.)	0–1; 1–1	17' Opoku (George)	Vroman; Dussenne, Nyakossi, Lawrence; Opoku (85' Ogiwara), Schrijvers (85' Pletinckx), George (85' Vaesen), Gil; Balikwisha, Mirisola (72' Ikwuemesi), Łakomy (69' Verstraete)	Jochmans; Addai; Fontanarosa; Murru	(yellow card) 6' Balikwisha; (yellow card) 42' Lawrence; (yellow card) 43' Gil
24 October 2026; 18:15; Den Dreef; Leuven	Oud-Heverlee Leuven	2–2	Lommel	Van den Heuvel; Lawrence, Pletinckx, Nyakossi; Ogiwara (90+4' Fontanarosa), George, Schrijvers, Opoku (80' Vlietinck); Balikwisha, Mirisola (80' Vaesen), Łakomy (46' Addai)	Vroman; Ikwuemesi; Kayo; Murru; Yamada	(yellow card) 12' Ogiwara; (yellow card) 71' Mirisola
24 October 2026; 18:15; Den Dreef; Leuven	65' Mirisola (Balikwisha); 67' Addai (Opoku)	0–1; 1–1; 2–1; 2–2	35' Appuah (Konadu) 90+6' Van Duiven (Nypan)	Van den Heuvel; Lawrence, Pletinckx, Nyakossi; Ogiwara (90+4' Fontanarosa), George, Schrijvers, Opoku (80' Vlietinck); Balikwisha, Mirisola (80' Vaesen), Łakomy (46' Addai)	Vroman; Ikwuemesi; Kayo; Murru; Yamada	(yellow card) 12' Ogiwara; (yellow card) 71' Mirisola
1 November 2026; 16:00; Stayen; Sint-Truiden	Sint-Truiden	1–2	Oud-Heverlee Leuven	Van den Heuvel; Lawrence, Pletinckx, Nyakossi; Ogiwara (73' Vlietinck), Schrijvers, George (90+5' Łakomy), Opoku; Balikwisha, Mirisola, Addai (67' Vaesen)	Vroman; Dussenne; Fontanarosa; Ikwuemesi; Kayo; Yamada	(yellow card) 55' Lawrence; (yellow card) 88' Opoku; (yellow card) 90+3' Nyakossi
1 November 2026; 16:00; Stayen; Sint-Truiden	46' Mbuku (Soèllé Soèllé)	1–0; 1–1; 1–2	53' Mirisola (Schrijvers); 81' Opoku (George)	Van den Heuvel; Lawrence, Pletinckx, Nyakossi; Ogiwara (73' Vlietinck), Schrijvers, George (90+5' Łakomy), Opoku; Balikwisha, Mirisola, Addai (67' Vaesen)	Vroman; Dussenne; Fontanarosa; Ikwuemesi; Kayo; Yamada	(yellow card) 55' Lawrence; (yellow card) 88' Opoku; (yellow card) 90+3' Nyakossi
7 November 2026; 18:15; Den Dreef; Leuven	Oud-Heverlee Leuven	2–0	Mechelen	Van den Heuvel; Lawrence, Pletinckx, Nyakossi (90+4' Dussenne); Opoku, Schrijvers, George, Gil (72' Vlietinck); Addai (72' Vaesen), Mirisola, Balikwisha,	Vroman; Fontanarosa; Ikwuemesi; Kayo; Łakomy; Yamada	(yellow card) 62' Lawrence; (yellow card) 80' Schrijvers; (yellow card) 86' Mirisola
7 November 2026; 18:15; Den Dreef; Leuven	50' Addai (Mirisola); 90+4' Balikwisha (without assist)	1–0; 2–0		Van den Heuvel; Lawrence, Pletinckx, Nyakossi (90+4' Dussenne); Opoku, Schrijvers, George, Gil (72' Vlietinck); Addai (72' Vaesen), Mirisola, Balikwisha,	Vroman; Fontanarosa; Ikwuemesi; Kayo; Łakomy; Yamada	(yellow card) 62' Lawrence; (yellow card) 80' Schrijvers; (yellow card) 86' Mirisola
22 November 2026; 18:30; Constant Vanden Stock Stadium; Anderlecht	Anderlecht		Oud-Heverlee Leuven			
27 November 2026; 20:45; Den Dreef; Leuven	Oud-Heverlee Leuven		Kortrijk			
11 December 2026; 20:45; Cegeka Arena; Genk	Genk		Oud-Heverlee Leuven			
18 December 2026; 20:45; Bosuilstadion; Antwerp	Antwerp		Oud-Heverlee Leuven			
26 December 2026; 18:15; Den Dreef; Leuven	Oud-Heverlee Leuven		Westerlo			
17 January 2027; 19:15; Elindus Arena; Waregem	Zulte Waregem		Oud-Heverlee Leuven			
January 2027; TBD; Den Dreef; Leuven	Oud-Heverlee Leuven		Sint-Truiden			
January 2027; TBD; Soevereinstadion; Lommel	Lommel		Oud-Heverlee Leuven			
February 2027; TBD; Den Dreef; Leuven	Oud-Heverlee Leuven		Anderlecht			
February 2027; TBD; Easi Arena; La Louvière	La Louvière		Oud-Heverlee Leuven			
February 2027; TBD; Den Dreef; Leuven	Oud-Heverlee Leuven		Antwerp			
February 2027; TBD; Jan Breydel Stadium; Bruges	Cercle Brugge		Oud-Heverlee Leuven			
March 2027; TBD; Den Dreef; Leuven	Oud-Heverlee Leuven		Genk			
March 2027; TBD; Guldensporen Stadion; Kortrijk	Kortrijk		Oud-Heverlee Leuven			
March 2027; TBD; Den Dreef; Leuven	Oud-Heverlee Leuven		Union SG			
April 2027; TBD; Den Dreef; Leuven	Oud-Heverlee Leuven		Zulte Waregem			
April 2027; TBD; Jan Breydel Stadium; Bruges	Club Brugge		Oud-Heverlee Leuven			
April 2027; TBD; Stade Maurice Dufrasne; Liège	Standard Liège		Oud-Heverlee Leuven			
April 2027; TBD; Den Dreef; Leuven	Oud-Heverlee Leuven		Beveren			
April 2027; TBD; Het Kuipje; Westerlo	Westerlo		Oud-Heverlee Leuven			
May 2027; TBD; Den Dreef; Leuven	Oud-Heverlee Leuven		Charleroi			
May 2027; TBD; Achter de Kazerne; Mechelen	Mechelen		Oud-Heverlee Leuven			
May 2027; TBD; Den Dreef; Leuven	Oud-Heverlee Leuven		Gent			

=== Belgian Cup ===
==== Results ====
2026–27 Belgian Cup
Match Details	Home team	Result	Away team	Lineup	Unused Subs	Bookings
7th Round
17 October 2026; 17:30; Den Dreef; Leuven	Oud-Heverlee Leuven	1–0	Francs Borains	Vroman; Opoku, Pletinckx, Nyakossi, Fontanarosa, Ogiwara; Łakomy (68' Schrijvers), Verstraete, Murru (68' George); Addai (68' Balikwisha), Ikwuemesi (88' Vaesen)	Jochmans; Kayo; Lawrence; Vlietinck; Yamada	(red card) 63' Verstraete; (yellow card) 90' Vroman; (red card) 90' Simons
17 October 2026; 17:30; Den Dreef; Leuven	61' Pletinckx (Murru)	1–0		Vroman; Opoku, Pletinckx, Nyakossi, Fontanarosa, Ogiwara; Łakomy (68' Schrijvers), Verstraete, Murru (68' George); Addai (68' Balikwisha), Ikwuemesi (88' Vaesen)	Jochmans; Kayo; Lawrence; Vlietinck; Yamada	(red card) 63' Verstraete; (yellow card) 90' Vroman; (red card) 90' Simons
8th Round
6 December 2026; 18:30; Bosuilstadion; Antwerp	Antwerp		Oud-Heverlee Leuven			

== Squad statistics ==
Includes only competitive matches.

=== Appearances ===
Players with no appearances are not included in the list.

No.	Pos.	Nat.	Name	Belgian Pro League Regular season			Belgian Cup			Total		
No.	Pos.	Nat.	Name	Starts	Sub	Unused Sub	Starts	Sub	Unused Sub	Starts	Sub	Unused Sub
1	GK	(Netherlands)	Dani van den Heuvel	10	0	0	0	0	0	10	0	0
3	DF	(Belgium)	Noë Dussenne	8	1	1	0	0	0	8	1	1
4	MF	(Belgium)	Birger Verstraete	5	1	2	1	0	0	6	1	2
5	DF	(Germany)	Jamie Lawrence	8	0	2	0	0	1	8	0	3
6	MF	(Belgium)	Wouter George	11	0	0	0	1	0	11	1	0
7	MF	(Ghana)	Emmanuel Addai	2	1	2	1	0	0	3	1	2
8	MF	(Belgium)	Siebe Schrijvers	10	0	0	0	1	0	10	1	0
9	MF	(Guinea)	Abdoul Karim Traoré	4	2	0	0	0	0	4	2	0
11	MF	(Germany)	Henok Teklab	2	1	1	0	0	0	2	1	1
13	GK	(Belgium)	Kiany Vroman	1	0	3	1	0	0	2	0	3
17	MF	(Belgium)	Kyan Vaesen	1	9	0	0	1	0	1	10	0
18	FW	(Belgium)	Robin Mirisola	6	1	0	0	0	0	6	1	0
19	FW	(Nigeria)	Chukwubuikem Ikwuemesi	4	2	5	1	0	0	5	2	5
20	FW	(Japan)	Shin Yamada	2	4	4	0	0	1	2	4	5
21	MF	(Democratic Republic of the Congo)	William Balikwisha	8	3	0	0	1	0	8	4	0
24	MF	(Poland)	Łukasz Łakomy	3	5	3	1	0	0	4	5	3
26	DF	(Japan)	Takuya Ogiwara	3	5	1	1	0	0	4	5	1
27	DF	(Spain)	Óscar Gil	9	0	0	0	0	0	9	0	0
28	DF	(Belgium)	Ewoud Pletinckx	8	2	0	1	0	0	9	2	0
30	DF	(Italy)	Alessandro Fontanarosa	0	1	4	1	0	0	1	1	4
34	DF	(Switzerland)	Roggerio Nyakossi	9	0	2	1	0	0	10	0	2
48	MF	(United States)	Bryang Kayo	0	2	6	0	0	1	0	2	7
61	GK	(Belgium)	Owen Jochmans	0	0	5	0	0	1	0	0	6
72	MF	(Belgium)	Sebastian Murru	0	0	5	1	0	0	1	0	5
77	DF	(Belgium)	Thibault Vlietinck	0	3	0	0	0	1	0	3	1
80	MF	(Belgium)	Matteo Heremans	0	0	3	0	0	0	0	0	3
99	DF	(Belgium)	Davis Opoku	7	4	0	1	0	0	8	4	0
Players that have appeared this season, who are out on loan or have left OH Leuven
1	GK	(Belgium)	Tobe Leysen (sold to Genk)	0	0	3	0	0	0	0	0	3

=== Goalscorers ===
Rank	Pos.	No.	Player	Belgian Pro League	Belgian Cup	Total
1	DF	99	(Belgium) Davis Opoku	3	0	3
2	MF	6	(Belgium) Wouter George	2	0	2
2	FW	7	(Ghana) Emmanuel Addai	2	0	2
2	FW	18	(Belgium) Robin Mirisola	2	0	2
2	MF	21	(Democratic Republic of the Congo) William Balikwisha	2	0	2
6	DF	27	(Spain) Óscar Gil	1	0	1
6	DF	28	(Belgium) Ewoud Pletinckx	0	1	1
Own Goals				0	0	0
Total				12	1	13

=== Assists ===
Rank	Pos.	No.	Player	Belgian Pro League	Belgian Cup	Total
1	MF	6	(Belgium) Wouter George	3	0	3
2	MF	8	(Belgium) Siebe Schrijvers	2	0	2
2	DF	99	(Belgium) Davis Opoku	2	0	2
4	FW	9	(Guinea) Abdoul Karim Traoré	1	0	1
4	FW	18	(Belgium) Robin Mirisola	1	0	1
4	FW	19	(Nigeria) Chukwubuikem Ikwuemesi	1	0	1
4	MF	21	(Democratic Republic of the Congo) William Balikwisha	1	0	1
4	MF	72	(Belgium) Sebastian Murru	0	1	1
Total Goals With Assists				11	1	12
No Assist
Penalties				0	0	0
Own Goals				0	0	0
Without Assist				1	0	1
Total Goals Without Assist				1	0	1

=== Clean sheets ===
No.	Player	Belgian Pro League	Belgian Cup	Total clean sheets	% Clean sheet games	Goals conceded	Avg minutes between conceding
1	(Belgium) Tobe Leysen	—N/a	—N/a	—N/a	—N/a	—N/a	—N/a
1 & 16	(Netherlands) Dani van den Heuvel	2	—N/a	2	20 %	16	56.25
13	(Belgium) Kiany Vroman	0	1	1	50 %	1	180
61	(Belgium) Owen Jochmans	—N/a	—N/a	—N/a	—N/a	—N/a	—N/a
