= 2025–26 Oud-Heverlee Leuven season =

Oud-Heverlee Leuven
2025–26 season
- Manager: David Hubert (until 13 October 2025); Hans Somers (13 October 2025-26 October 2025); Felice Mazzù (since 26 October 2025)
- Stadium: Den Dreef
- Regular season: 12th
- Europe play-offs: 6th (12th overall)
- Belgian Cup: 8th round

The 2025–26 season was the 24th season in the history of the Oud-Heverlee Leuven, and the club's sixth consecutive season in the Belgian Pro League. Similar to the two previous seasons, the club narrowly avoided the relegation play-offs but then did not manage to perform during the Europe play-offs. In the Belgian Cup, OH Leuven drew Club Brugge for the second successive season, narrowly losing at home in the 8th round.

== Players ==
- This section lists players who were in Oud-Heveree Leuven's first-team squad at any point during the 2025–26 season and appeared at least once on the match sheet (possibly as unused substitute)
- The symbol ℒ indicates a player who is on loan from another club
- The symbol ¥ indicates a youngster, mostly playing for OH Leuven U23

No.	Nationality	Name	Position	Joined First Team	Previous club	Left First Team
Goalkeepers
1	(Belgium)	Tobe Leysen	GK	19 August 2023	(Belgium) Genk	–
16	(France)	Maxence Prévot	GK	13 August 2023	Sochaux	–
61	(Belgium)	Owen Jochmans^{¥}	GK	Summer 2024	Youth Squad	–
95	(Belgium)	Théo Radelet^{¥}	GK	Summer 2024	Youth Squad	–
Defenders
3	(Belgium)	Noë Dussenne	CB	19 August 2025	(Switzerland) Lausanne-Sport	–
5	(Japan)	Takuma Ominami	CB	20 August 2024	(Japan) Kawasaki Frontale	–
15	(Croatia)	Viktor Damjanić	CB	23 July 2025	(Serbia) Jedinstvo Ub	–
27	(Spain)	Óscar Gil	RB	1 August 2024	(Spain) Espanyol	–
28	(Belgium)	Ewoud Pletinckx	CB	17 June 2022	(Belgium) Zulte Waregem	–
30	(Japan)	Takahiro Akimoto	LB / LW	20 January 2024	(Japan) Urawa Red Diamonds	–
34	(Switzerland) / (Togo)	Roggerio Nyakossi	CB / DM	27 January 2025	Marseille	–
40	(Belgium) / (Italy)	Roméo Monticelli^{¥}	LB	5 July 2024	(Belgium) Charleroi	–
43	(Republic of Ireland)	Liam McAlinney^{¥}	CB	Summer 2025	Youth Squad	–
63	(Belgium)	Christ Souanga^{¥}	LB	Winter 2023–24	Youth Squad	–
66	(Japan)	Ayumu Ōhata	LB / LW	29 January 2025	(Japan) Urawa Red Diamonds	11 August 2025
93	(Belgium)	Milan Gigot^{¥}	CB	Fall 2025	Youth Squad	–
99	(Belgium)	Davis Opoku^{¥}	RB / RW	Playoffs 2024	Youth Squad	–
Midfielders
4	(Belgium)	Birger Verstraete	DM	10 July 2024	(Greece) Aris	–
6	(Belgium)	Wouter George	CM	Summer 2024	Youth Squad	–
7	(Belgium)	Thibaud Verlinden	LW	4 February 2025	Beerschot	–
14	(Germany) / (Eritrea)	Henok Teklab	LW	5 September 2025	(Belgium) Union SG	–
24	(Poland)	Łukasz Łakomy^{ℒ}	CM / DM / AM	25 August 2025	(Switzerland) Young Boys	(30 June 2026)
33	(Belgium)	Mathieu Maertens	CM / AM	12 July 2017	(Belgium) Cercle Brugge	–
42	(Turkey) / (Belgium)	Hasan Bulut^{¥}	AM / CM	Spring 2026	Youth Squad	–
48	(United States) / (Cameroon)	Bryang Kayo	CM	26 June 2025	(Germany) Osnabrück	–
60	(Morocco) / (Belgium)	Mohamed Yassine Azzouz^{¥}	AM	Winter 2024–25	Youth Squad	–
72	(Belgium)	Sebastian Murru^{¥}	CM	Summer 2025	Youth Squad	–
77	(Belgium)	Thibault Vlietinck	RW	12 August 2020	(Belgium) Club Brugge	–
80	(Belgium)	Matteo Heremans^{¥}	AM / CM	Spring 2026	Youth Squad	–
Forwards
8	(Belgium)	Siebe Schrijvers	CF / AM / RW	15 January 2021	(Belgium) Club Brugge	–
9	(Guinea)	Abdoul Karim Traoré	CF	8 July 2025	(France) Bourg-Péronnas	–
10	(France) / (Morocco)	Youssef Maziz	AM / LW	29 August 2023	(France) Metz	–
11	(Finland)	Casper Terho	RW	3 July 2025	(Belgium) Union SG	2 February 2026
17	(Belgium)	Kyan Vaesen	CF	2 February 2026	(Belgium) Westerlo	–
19	(Nigeria)	Chukwubuikem Ikwuemesi	CF	24 July 2024	Salernitana	–
20	(Belgium)	Nachon Nsingi	CF	Summer 2022	Youth Squad	23 January 2026
21	(Democratic Republic of the Congo) / (Belgium)	William Balikwisha	AM / RW / LW	20 July 2024	Standard Liège	–
22	(Serbia)	Jovan Mijatović^{ℒ}	CF / RW / LW	31 January 2025	New York City	29 January 2026
39	(Guinea)	Sory Kaba	CF	9 September 2025	(Spain) Las Palmas	–

=== Did not appear on match sheet ===
The following players were listed as part of Oud-Heverlee Leuven's first-team squad during (part of) the 2025–26 season, but never appeared on the match sheet

No.	Nationality	Name	Position	Joined First Team	Previous club	Left First Team	Note
25	(Belgium)	Manuel Osifo	DM / CB	1 February 2024	(Belgium) Oostende	21 August 2025	Loaned to (Belgium) Kortrijk after matchday 4

== Transfers ==
=== Transfers in ===
Date Announced	Position	Nationality	Name	From	Fee	Ref.
End of 2024–25 season	FW	(Belgium)	Nachon Nsingi	(Portugal) Marítimo	Loan Return	
End of 2024–25 season	MF	(Ghana)	Emmanuel Toku	(Cyprus) AEL Limassol	Loan Return	
17 June 2025	DF	(Japan)	Takuma Ominami	Kawasaki Frontale	Buy Clause Activated	
26 June 2025	MF	(United States)	Bryang Kayo	Osnabrück	Undisclosed	
2 July 2025	FW	(Serbia)	Jovan Mijatović	New York City	Loan Extended	
3 July 2025	MF	(Finland)	Casper Terho	Union SG	Undisclosed	
8 July 2025	FW	(Guinea)	Abdoul Karim Traoré	Bourg-Péronnas	Undisclosed	
23 July 2025	DF	(Croatia)	Viktor Damjanić	Jedinstvo Ub	Undisclosed	
19 August 2025	DF	(Belgium)	Noë Dussenne	Lausanne-Sport	Undisclosed	
25 August 2025	MF	(Poland)	Łukasz Łakomy	Young Boys	Loan	
5 September 2025	MF	(Germany)	Henok Teklab	Union SG	Undisclosed	
9 September 2025	FW	(Guinea)	Sory Kaba	(Spain) Las Palmas	Free	
2 February 2026	FW	(Belgium)	Kyan Vaesen	Westerlo	Undisclosed	

=== Transfers out ===
Date Announced	Position	Nationality	Name	To	Fee	Ref.
8 April 2025	MF	(Netherlands)	Ezechiel Banzuzi	Leipzig	Undisclosed	
26 June 2025	DF	(Uruguay)	Federico Ricca	Belgrano	Free	
End of 2024–25 season	DF	(Turkey)	Hasan Kuruçay	Schalke 04	Free	
End of 2024–25 season	MF	(Serbia)	Stefan Mitrović	Hellas Verona	Loan Return	
End of 2024–25 season	DF	(Belgium)	Antef Tsoungui	Feyenoord	Loan Return	
End of 2024–25 season	FW	(Netherlands)	Lequincio Zeefuik	AZ Alkmaar	Loan Return	
1 July 2025	FW	(Norway)	Jonatan Braut Brunes	Raków Częstochowa	Buy Clause Activated	
9 July 2025	MF	(Ghana)	Emmanuel Toku	Free Agent	Released	
11 August 2025	DF	(Japan)	Ayumu Ōhata	Cerezo Osaka	Undisclosed	
21 August 2025	MF	(Belgium)	Manuel Osifo	Kortrijk	Loan	
23 January 2026	FW	(Belgium)	Nachon Nsingi	La Louvière	Free	
29 January 2026	FW	(Serbia)	Jovan Mijatović	New York City	Loan Terminated	
2 February 2026	MF	(Finland)	Casper Terho	Sparta Rotterdam	Loan	

== Friendlies ==
=== Pre-season ===
28 June 2025 Friendly	OH Leuven (Belgium)	10–0	(Belgium) Kessel-Lo 2000	Oud-Heverlee
14:00	Ikwuemesi; Murru; Maziz; Schrijvers; Maertens; Nsingi			Stadium: Banqup Campus

2 July 2025 Friendly	OH Leuven (Belgium)	15–0	(Belgium) Rapide Wezemaal	Oud-Heverlee
19:00	Balikwisha; Maertens; Nsingi; Murru; Diallo; Nyakossi; George; Maziz; Ikwuemesi			Stadium: Banqup Campus

5 July 2025 Friendly	OH Leuven (Belgium)	Cancelled	(Netherlands) RKC Waalwijk	Oud-Heverlee
				Stadium: Banqup Campus; Attendance: 0

12 July 2025 Friendly	Leicester City (England)	2–1	(Belgium) OH Leuven	Seagrave, England
15:00 CEST	Akimoto 9' (o.g.); Ayew 118'		Mijatović 51'

19 July 2025 Friendly	OH Leuven (Belgium)	2–1	Seraing	Oud-Heverlee
11:00	18'		Muland 8'	Stadium: Banqup Campus; Attendance: 0

20 July 2025 Friendly	Reims (France)	0–1	OH Leuven	Reims
11:00			Schrijvers 47' (pen.)

=== During the season ===
4 September 2025 Friendly	OH Leuven (Belgium)	3–3	(Belgium) Charleroi	Oud-Heverlee
11:30	Ikwuemesi; Maziz; Nsingi	Report	unknown	Stadium: Banqup Campus; Attendance: 0

10 October 2025 Friendly	OH Leuven (Belgium)	4–3	(Belgium) Francs Borains
	Maertens; Schrijvers; Ikwuemesi; Maziz	Report		Attendance: 0

13 November 2025 Friendly	OH Leuven (Belgium)	3–0	(Belgium) RFC Liège	Oud-Heverlee
	Balikwisha; Verstraete; Maertens	Report		Stadium: Banqup Campus

8 January 2026 Friendly	Preußen Münster (Germany)	2–1	(Belgium) OH Leuven	Algorfa, Spain
16:00	Hendrix; Lokotsch	Report	Kaba	Stadium: Pinatar Arena

== Competitions ==
=== Overall record ===
Competition	First match	Last match	Starting round	Final position	Record							
Competition	First match	Last match	Starting round	Final position	Pld	W	D	L	GF	GA	GD	Win %
Belgian Pro League regular season	27 July 2025	22 March 2026	Matchday 1	12th	30	9	7	14	32	43	−11	30.00
Belgian Pro League Europe play-offs	4 April 2026	23 May 2026	Matchday 1	6th (12th overall)	10	1	3	6	9	17	−8	10.00
Belgian Cup	30 October 2025	3 December 2025	Seventh round	Eighth round	2	1	0	1	4	3	+1	50.00
Total					42	11	10	21	45	63	−18	26.19

Source: Soccerway

=== Pro League ===
==== Regular season ====
Pos	Team	Pld	W	D	L	GF	GA	GD	Pts	Qualification or relegation
10	Antwerp	30	9	8	13	31	32	−1	35	Qualification for the Europe play-offs
11	Charleroi	30	9	7	14	38	42	−4	34	Qualification for the Europe play-offs
12	OH Leuven	30	9	7	14	32	43	−11	34	Qualification for the Europe play-offs
13	Zulte Waregem	30	8	8	14	38	47	−9	32	Qualification for the Relegation play-offs
14	Cercle Brugge	30	7	10	13	39	47	−8	31	Qualification for the Relegation play-offs

Source: Jupiler Pro League (in Dutch)
Rules for classification: 1) Points; 2) Matches won; 3) Goal difference; 4) Goals scored; 5) Away matches won; 6) Away goal difference; 7) Away goals scored; 8) Play-off.

===== Results summary =====
Overall								Home						Away					
Pld	W	D	L	GF	GA	GD	Pts	W	D	L	GF	GA	GD	W	D	L	GF	GA	GD
30	9	7	14	32	43	−11	34	4	5	6	18	18	0	5	2	8	14	25	−11

Source: Jupiler Pro League Ranking

===== Results by round =====
Round	1	2	3	4	5	6	7	8	9	10	11	12	13	14	15	16	17	18	19	20	21	22	23	24	25	26	27	28	29	30
Ground	H	A	A	H	A	H	A	H	H	A	H	A	H	A	H	A	H	A	H	A	A	H	H	A	H	A	A	H	A	H
Result	D	L	L	L	W	W	L	L	D	L	L	D	W	W	L	L	D	W	L	D	L	D	D	W	W	L	L	L	W	W
Position	6	15	16	16	13	10	15	15	15	15	15	15	13	13	13	14	14	13	13	13	14	14	14	13	13	13	13	13	12	12
Points	1	1	1	1	4	7	7	7	8	8	8	9	12	15	15	15	16	19	19	20	20	21	22	25	28	28	28	28	31	34

Updated to match(es) played on 22 March 2026. Source: Jupiler Pro League
A = Away; H = Home; W = Win; D = Draw; L = Loss; = Champions' Play-offs; = Europe Play-offs; = Relegation Play-offs

===== Points breakdown =====
Points at home: 17
Points away from home: 17

Points against 2024/25 Champions' Play-offs teams (6): 11 (30.56 %)
Points against 2024/25 Europe Play-offs teams (5): 18 (60 %)
Points against 2024/25 Relegation Play-offs teams (2): 3 (25 %)
Points against newly promoted teams (2): 2 (16.67 %)

6 points: Dender EH, Gent, Standard Liège
4 points: Charleroi
3 points: Antwerp, Cercle Brugge
2 points: Mechelen
1 point: Anderlecht, La Louvière, Union SG, Zulte Waregem
0 points: Club Brugge, Genk, Sint-Truiden, Westerlo

===== Biggest & smallest =====
Biggest home win: 4–0 vs. Gent
Biggest home defeat: 0–2 vs. Cercle Brugge
Biggest away win: 1–3 vs. Gent; 0–2 vs. Charleroi
Biggest away defeat: 5–0 vs. Union SG

Biggest home attendance: 9,545 vs. Club Brugge
Smallest home attendance: 5,085 vs. Dender EH
Biggest away attendance: 18,885 vs. Club Brugge
Smallest away attendance: 2,600 vs. Dender EH

===== Matches =====
The match schedule was released on 20 June 2025.

2025–26 Belgian Pro League
Match Details	Home team	Result	Away team	Lineup	Unused Subs	Bookings
Regular Season
27 July 2025; 16:00; Den Dreef; Leuven	Oud-Heverlee Leuven	2–2	Charleroi	Leysen; Akimoto, Pletinckx, Ominami, Gil; Verstraete, Maertens (62' Maziz), Schrijvers; Verlinden (62' Terho), Traoré (71' Mijatović), Balikwisha (87' Nsingi)	Prévot; George; Monticelli; Nyakossi; Vlietinck	(yellow card) 61' Gil; (yellow card) 70' Maertens
27 July 2025; 16:00; Den Dreef; Leuven	3' Maertens (Verlinden); 79' Maziz (Mijatović)	1–0; 2–0; 2–1; 2–2	90' Bernier (without assist); 90+4' Dragsnes (without assist)	Leysen; Akimoto, Pletinckx, Ominami, Gil; Verstraete, Maertens (62' Maziz), Schrijvers; Verlinden (62' Terho), Traoré (71' Mijatović), Balikwisha (87' Nsingi)	Prévot; George; Monticelli; Nyakossi; Vlietinck	(yellow card) 61' Gil; (yellow card) 70' Maertens
3 August 2025; 18:30; Joseph Marien Stadium; Forest, Brussels	Union SG	5–0	Oud-Heverlee Leuven	Leysen; Akimoto, Pletinckx, Ominami, Gil (72' Vlietinck); Verstraete, Maziz (58' Maertens), Schrijvers; Terho (58' Verlinden), Mijatović (83' Nsingi), Balikwisha (58' Traoré)	Prévot; George; Monticelli; Nyakossi; Ōhata	(yellow card) 66' Schrijvers; (yellow card) 79' Traoré
3 August 2025; 18:30; Joseph Marien Stadium; Forest, Brussels	1' Khalaily (Zorgane); 4' Sykes (Ait El Hadj); 48' Florucz (pen.); 59' Florucz (Leysen); 71' Niang (Boufal)	1–0; 2–0; 3–0; 4–0; 5–0		Leysen; Akimoto, Pletinckx, Ominami, Gil (72' Vlietinck); Verstraete, Maziz (58' Maertens), Schrijvers; Terho (58' Verlinden), Mijatović (83' Nsingi), Balikwisha (58' Traoré)	Prévot; George; Monticelli; Nyakossi; Ōhata	(yellow card) 66' Schrijvers; (yellow card) 79' Traoré
10 August 2025; 19:15; Bosuilstadion; Antwerp	Antwerp	3–1	Oud-Heverlee Leuven	Leysen; Nyakossi, Pletinckx, Ominami; Akimoto, Verstraete, Terho (72' Verlinden), Schrijvers (72' George), Gil (72' Vlietinck); Traoré (80' Nsingi), Mijatović (88' W. Balikwisha)	Prévot; Maziz; Opoku; Souanga	(yellow card) 32' Traoré; (yellow card) 40' Pletinckx; (yellow card) 45+2' (yellow-red card) 83' Verstraete; (yellow card) 90+6' Vlietinck
10 August 2025; 19:15; Bosuilstadion; Antwerp	36' M.-A. Balikwisha (pen.); 78' Doumbia (pen.) 90+7' Adekami (Foulon)	1–0; 2–0; 2–1; 3–1	87' Pletinckx (George)	Leysen; Nyakossi, Pletinckx, Ominami; Akimoto, Verstraete, Terho (72' Verlinden), Schrijvers (72' George), Gil (72' Vlietinck); Traoré (80' Nsingi), Mijatović (88' W. Balikwisha)	Prévot; Maziz; Opoku; Souanga	(yellow card) 32' Traoré; (yellow card) 40' Pletinckx; (yellow card) 45+2' (yellow-red card) 83' Verstraete; (yellow card) 90+6' Vlietinck
15 August 2025; 20:45; Den Dreef; Leuven	Oud-Heverlee Leuven	1–2	Genk	Leysen; Nyakossi (83' Nsingi), Pletinckx, Ominami; Akimoto, George (90' Murru), Terho (69' Balikwisha), Schrijvers, Gil (69' Vlietinck); Traoré, Mijatović (83' Maziz)	Prévot; Azzouz; Opoku; Souanga	(yellow card) 87' Nsingi; (yellow card) 89' Maziz
15 August 2025; 20:45; Den Dreef; Leuven	38' Nyakossi (without assist)	0–1; 0–2; 1–2	14' El Ouahdi (Steuckers); 20' El Ouahdi (Steuckers)	Leysen; Nyakossi (83' Nsingi), Pletinckx, Ominami; Akimoto, George (90' Murru), Terho (69' Balikwisha), Schrijvers, Gil (69' Vlietinck); Traoré, Mijatović (83' Maziz)	Prévot; Azzouz; Opoku; Souanga	(yellow card) 87' Nsingi; (yellow card) 89' Maziz
24 August 2025; 19:15; Van Roystadion; Denderleeuw	Dender EH	0–1	Oud-Heverlee Leuven	Leysen; Dussenne, Pletinckx, Ominami; Akimoto, George (46' Verstraete), Terho (68' Maziz), Schrijvers, Gil (46' Vlietinck); Traoré (83' Nsingi), Mijatović (89' Maertens)	Prévot; Balikwisha; Nyakossi; Verlinden	(yellow card) 58' Verstraete; (yellow card) 78' Vlietinck; (yellow card) 90' Maertens; (yellow card) 90+3' Nsingi
24 August 2025; 19:15; Van Roystadion; Denderleeuw		0–1	71' Pletinckx (Schrijvers)	Leysen; Dussenne, Pletinckx, Ominami; Akimoto, George (46' Verstraete), Terho (68' Maziz), Schrijvers, Gil (46' Vlietinck); Traoré (83' Nsingi), Mijatović (89' Maertens)	Prévot; Balikwisha; Nyakossi; Verlinden	(yellow card) 58' Verstraete; (yellow card) 78' Vlietinck; (yellow card) 90' Maertens; (yellow card) 90+3' Nsingi
31 August 2025; 16:00; Den Dreef; Leuven	Oud-Heverlee Leuven	1–0	Standard Liège	Leysen; Dussenne, Pletinckx, Ominami; Akimoto, Schrijvers, Terho (61' Verstraete), Łakomy (73' Maziz), Vlietinck (61' Opoku); Traoré (73' Ikwuemesi), Mijatović (86' Maertens)	Prévot; George; Nyakossi; Verlinden	(yellow card) 26' Vlietinck; (yellow card) 36' Ominami; (yellow card) 90+5' Schrijvers
31 August 2025; 16:00; Den Dreef; Leuven	65' Dierckx (o.g.)	1–0		Leysen; Dussenne, Pletinckx, Ominami; Akimoto, Schrijvers, Terho (61' Verstraete), Łakomy (73' Maziz), Vlietinck (61' Opoku); Traoré (73' Ikwuemesi), Mijatović (86' Maertens)	Prévot; George; Nyakossi; Verlinden	(yellow card) 26' Vlietinck; (yellow card) 36' Ominami; (yellow card) 90+5' Schrijvers
13 September 2025; 16:00; Elindus Arena; Waregem	Zulte Waregem	2–0	Oud-Heverlee Leuven	Leysen; Dussenne, Pletinckx, Ominami; Akimoto, Schrijvers, Maziz (78' Nsingi), Łakomy (72' Maertens), Gil (46' D. Opoku); Traoré (46' Ikwuemesi), Mijatović (72' Teklab)	Prévot; George; Nyakossi; Terho	(yellow card) 24' Schrijvers; (yellow card) 39' Ominami; (yellow card) 54' Leysen; (yellow card) 90' Nsingi
13 September 2025; 16:00; Elindus Arena; Waregem	13' Claes (without assist); 38' Cappelle (J. Opoku)	1–0; 2–0		Leysen; Dussenne, Pletinckx, Ominami; Akimoto, Schrijvers, Maziz (78' Nsingi), Łakomy (72' Maertens), Gil (46' D. Opoku); Traoré (46' Ikwuemesi), Mijatović (72' Teklab)	Prévot; George; Nyakossi; Terho	(yellow card) 24' Schrijvers; (yellow card) 39' Ominami; (yellow card) 54' Leysen; (yellow card) 90' Nsingi
21 September 2025; 16:00; Den Dreef; Leuven	Oud-Heverlee Leuven	1–2	La Louvière	Leysen; Dussenne, Pletinckx, Ominami; Akimoto, Verstraete (62' Maziz), Schrijvers (90' Ikwuemesi), Łakomy, Gil (62' Terho); Kaba, Mijatović (75' Maertens)	Prévot; Nyakossi; Opoku; Teklab; Traoré	(yellow card) 47' Gil; (yellow card) 65' Dussenne; (yellow card) 90+4' Maertens; (yellow card) 90+6' Terho
21 September 2025; 16:00; Den Dreef; Leuven	8' Kaba (Łakomy)	1–0; 1–1; 1–2	16' Afriyie (Lahssaini); 27' Afriyie (Ito)	Leysen; Dussenne, Pletinckx, Ominami; Akimoto, Verstraete (62' Maziz), Schrijvers (90' Ikwuemesi), Łakomy, Gil (62' Terho); Kaba, Mijatović (75' Maertens)	Prévot; Nyakossi; Opoku; Teklab; Traoré	(yellow card) 47' Gil; (yellow card) 65' Dussenne; (yellow card) 90+4' Maertens; (yellow card) 90+6' Terho
26 September 2025; 20:45; Den Dreef; Leuven	Oud-Heverlee Leuven	1–1	Anderlecht	Leysen; Dussenne, Pletinckx, Ominami (75' Maziz); Akimoto, Schrijvers (75' Maertens), Terho (75' Mijatović), Łakomy, Gil; Ikwuemesi (61' Traoré), Kaba	Prévot; Nyakossi; Opoku; Teklab; Verstraete	(yellow card) 51' Akimoto; (yellow card) 61' Terho; (yellow card) 83' Maziz; (yellow card) 90+3' Mijatović
26 September 2025; 20:45; Den Dreef; Leuven	80' Maziz (without assist)	0–1; 1–1	55' Vázquez (Angulo)	Leysen; Dussenne, Pletinckx, Ominami (75' Maziz); Akimoto, Schrijvers (75' Maertens), Terho (75' Mijatović), Łakomy, Gil; Ikwuemesi (61' Traoré), Kaba	Prévot; Nyakossi; Opoku; Teklab; Verstraete	(yellow card) 51' Akimoto; (yellow card) 61' Terho; (yellow card) 83' Maziz; (yellow card) 90+3' Mijatović
5 October 2025; 19:15; Het Kuipje; Westerlo	Westerlo	2–0	Oud-Heverlee Leuven	Leysen; Dussenne (80' Nyakossi), Pletinckx, Ominami (62' Teklab); Akimoto, Schrijvers, Terho (46' Maziz), Łakomy (80' Maertens), Gil; Ikwuemesi (62' Verlinden), Kaba	Prévot; Mijatović; Traoré; Verstraete	(yellow card) 26' Dussenne; (yellow card) 90+6' Akimoto
5 October 2025; 19:15; Het Kuipje; Westerlo	19' Ferri (without assist); 77' Mebude (Reynolds)	1–0; 2–0		Leysen; Dussenne (80' Nyakossi), Pletinckx, Ominami (62' Teklab); Akimoto, Schrijvers, Terho (46' Maziz), Łakomy (80' Maertens), Gil; Ikwuemesi (62' Verlinden), Kaba	Prévot; Mijatović; Traoré; Verstraete	(yellow card) 26' Dussenne; (yellow card) 90+6' Akimoto
18 October 2025; 18:15; Den Dreef; Leuven	Oud-Heverlee Leuven	0–1	Club Brugge	Leysen; Dussenne, Pletinckx, Ominami; Akimoto, Schrijvers (18' George), Łakomy, Gil; Maziz (55' Mijatović), Ikwuemesi (74' Kaba), Maertens (74' Traoré)	Prévot; Nyakossi; Opoku; Teklab; Verlinden	(yellow card) 54' Ominami; (yellow card) 56' Gil
18 October 2025; 18:15; Den Dreef; Leuven		0–1	77' Tzolis (Diakhon)	Leysen; Dussenne, Pletinckx, Ominami; Akimoto, Schrijvers (18' George), Łakomy, Gil; Maziz (55' Mijatović), Ikwuemesi (74' Kaba), Maertens (74' Traoré)	Prévot; Nyakossi; Opoku; Teklab; Verlinden	(yellow card) 54' Ominami; (yellow card) 56' Gil
25 October 2025; 18:15; Achter de Kazerne; Mechelen	Mechelen	1–1	Oud-Heverlee Leuven	Leysen; Nyakossi (81' Verlinden), Pletinckx, Dussenne; Akimoto, George, Łakomy (81' Traoré), Gil (63' Opoku); Maziz, Ikwuemesi (63' Kaba), Maertens (46' Mijatović)	Prévot; McAlinney; Teklab; Vlietinck	(yellow card) 35' Pletinckx; (yellow card) 53' Gil; (yellow card) 54' Łakomy; (yellow card) 63' Ikwuemesi; (yellow card) 90' Kaba
25 October 2025; 18:15; Achter de Kazerne; Mechelen	74' Koudou (Lauberbach)	1–0; 1–1	90+5' Pletinckx (Maziz)	Leysen; Nyakossi (81' Verlinden), Pletinckx, Dussenne; Akimoto, George, Łakomy (81' Traoré), Gil (63' Opoku); Maziz, Ikwuemesi (63' Kaba), Maertens (46' Mijatović)	Prévot; McAlinney; Teklab; Vlietinck	(yellow card) 35' Pletinckx; (yellow card) 53' Gil; (yellow card) 54' Łakomy; (yellow card) 63' Ikwuemesi; (yellow card) 90' Kaba
2 November 2025; 16:00; Den Dreef; Leuven	Oud-Heverlee Leuven	4–0	Gent	Leysen; Akimoto, Dussenne, Nyakossi (78' Teklab), Pletinckx, Gil (87' Opoku); George, Maziz (73' Maertens), Łakomy; Kaba (87' Traoré), Ikwuemesi (73' Verstraete)	Prévot; Mijatović; Terho; Verlinden	(yellow card) 11' Gil; (yellow card) 47' George; (yellow card) 82' Akimoto; (yellow card) 90+3' Teklab
2 November 2025; 16:00; Den Dreef; Leuven	32' Ikwuemesi (Maziz); 43' Łakomy (without assist); 63' Nyakossi (without assist); 80' Teklab (Maertens)	1–0; 2–0; 3–0; 4–0		Leysen; Akimoto, Dussenne, Nyakossi (78' Teklab), Pletinckx, Gil (87' Opoku); George, Maziz (73' Maertens), Łakomy; Kaba (87' Traoré), Ikwuemesi (73' Verstraete)	Prévot; Mijatović; Terho; Verlinden	(yellow card) 11' Gil; (yellow card) 47' George; (yellow card) 82' Akimoto; (yellow card) 90+3' Teklab
8 November 2025; 16:00; Jan Breydel Stadium; Bruges	Cercle Brugge	1–2	Oud-Heverlee Leuven	Leysen; Akimoto, Dussenne, Nyakossi (46' Verlinden), Pletinckx, Vlietinck (29' Opoku); Maziz (22' Verstraete), George (46' Maertens), Łakomy; Kaba, Ikwuemesi (80' Mijatović)	Prévot; McAlinney; Teklab; Traoré	(yellow card) 41' Kaba
8 November 2025; 16:00; Jan Breydel Stadium; Bruges	37' Diop (without assist)	1–0; 1–1; 1–2	49' Łakomy (Kaba); 61' Kaba (Maertens)	Leysen; Akimoto, Dussenne, Nyakossi (46' Verlinden), Pletinckx, Vlietinck (29' Opoku); Maziz (22' Verstraete), George (46' Maertens), Łakomy; Kaba, Ikwuemesi (80' Mijatović)	Prévot; McAlinney; Teklab; Traoré	(yellow card) 41' Kaba
23 November 2025; 19:15; Den Dreef; Leuven	Oud-Heverlee Leuven	1–2	Sint-Truiden	Leysen; Akimoto, Pletinckx, Dussenne, Gil (46' Opoku); Verstraete (86' Traoré), Maertens, Łakomy (61' George); Verlinden (73' Teklab), Kaba, Ikwuemesi (73' Mijatović)	Prévot; Gigot; Nyakossi; Ominami	(yellow card) 40' Pletinckx; (yellow card) 50' Verlinden; (yellow card) 85' Mijatović
23 November 2025; 19:15; Den Dreef; Leuven	45+4' Verlinden (Łakomy)	0–1; 0–2; 1–2	21' Itō (pen.); 41' Sebaoui (Yamamoto)	Leysen; Akimoto, Pletinckx, Dussenne, Gil (46' Opoku); Verstraete (86' Traoré), Maertens, Łakomy (61' George); Verlinden (73' Teklab), Kaba, Ikwuemesi (73' Mijatović)	Prévot; Gigot; Nyakossi; Ominami	(yellow card) 40' Pletinckx; (yellow card) 50' Verlinden; (yellow card) 85' Mijatović
30 November 2025; 16:00; Cegeka Arena; Genk	Genk	2–1	Oud-Heverlee Leuven	Leysen; Nyakossi, Pletinckx, Dussenne (87' Traoré); Teklab (46' Gil), Verstraete, Łakomy (67' Maziz), Opoku (79' Terho); Verlinden (67' Kaba), Ikwuemesi, Maertens	Prévot; George; Mijatović; Ominami	(yellow card) 14' Teklab; (yellow card) 38' Dussenne; (yellow card) 68' Verstraete
30 November 2025; 16:00; Cegeka Arena; Genk	50' Sadick (Karetsas) 81' Heymans (Karetsas)	1–0; 1–1; 2–1	78' Kaba (Opoku)	Leysen; Nyakossi, Pletinckx, Dussenne (87' Traoré); Teklab (46' Gil), Verstraete, Łakomy (67' Maziz), Opoku (79' Terho); Verlinden (67' Kaba), Ikwuemesi, Maertens	Prévot; George; Mijatović; Ominami	(yellow card) 14' Teklab; (yellow card) 38' Dussenne; (yellow card) 68' Verstraete
7 December 2025; 19:15; Den Dreef; Leuven	Oud-Heverlee Leuven	1–1	Zulte Waregem	Leysen; Nyakossi, Pletinckx, Dussenne; Verlinden (39' Terho), Verstraete, Łakomy (75' George), Gil (75' Opoku); Maziz (64' Ikwuemesi), Kaba (75' Traoré), Maertens	Prévot; Mijatović; Ominami; Teklab	(yellow card) 40' Verstraete; (yellow card) 90+2' Traoré
7 December 2025; 19:15; Den Dreef; Leuven	8' Verlinden (Łakomy)	1–0; 1–1	35' Nyssen (Nnadi)	Leysen; Nyakossi, Pletinckx, Dussenne; Verlinden (39' Terho), Verstraete, Łakomy (75' George), Gil (75' Opoku); Maziz (64' Ikwuemesi), Kaba (75' Traoré), Maertens	Prévot; Mijatović; Ominami; Teklab	(yellow card) 40' Verstraete; (yellow card) 90+2' Traoré
12 December 2025; 20:45; Stade Maurice Dufrasne; Liège	Standard Liège	0–1	Oud-Heverlee Leuven	Leysen; Nyakossi (63' Ominami), Pletinckx, Dussenne; Teklab, Verstraete, Maziz (79' George), Łakomy, Gil (79' Opoku); Kaba, Ikwuemesi (68' Maertens)	Prévot; Damjanić; Mijatović; Terho; Traoré	(yellow card) 90+5' George; (yellow card) 90+9' Leysen
12 December 2025; 20:45; Stade Maurice Dufrasne; Liège		0–1	73' Kaba (without assist)	Leysen; Nyakossi (63' Ominami), Pletinckx, Dussenne; Teklab, Verstraete, Maziz (79' George), Łakomy, Gil (79' Opoku); Kaba, Ikwuemesi (68' Maertens)	Prévot; Damjanić; Mijatović; Terho; Traoré	(yellow card) 90+5' George; (yellow card) 90+9' Leysen
21 December 2025; 19:15; Den Dreef; Leuven	Oud-Heverlee Leuven	0–2	Cercle Brugge	Leysen; Nyakossi, Pletinckx (28' Maertens), Dussenne (78' Terho); Teklab (28' Opoku), Maziz (46' Verlinden), Verstraete, Łakomy (46' George), Gil; Kaba, Ikwuemesi	Prévot; Mijatović; Ominami; Traoré	(yellow card) 41' Opoku; (yellow card) 45+2' Kaba; (yellow card) 67' Verstraete; (yellow card) 87' Verlinden; (yellow card) 90+3' Nyakossi
21 December 2025; 19:15; Den Dreef; Leuven		0–1; 0–2	7' Gerkens (without assist); 19' Gerkens (Ngoura)	Leysen; Nyakossi, Pletinckx (28' Maertens), Dussenne (78' Terho); Teklab (28' Opoku), Maziz (46' Verlinden), Verstraete, Łakomy (46' George), Gil; Kaba, Ikwuemesi	Prévot; Mijatović; Ominami; Traoré	(yellow card) 41' Opoku; (yellow card) 45+2' Kaba; (yellow card) 67' Verstraete; (yellow card) 87' Verlinden; (yellow card) 90+3' Nyakossi
27 December 2025; 16:00; Easi Arena; La Louvière	La Louvière	0–0	Oud-Heverlee Leuven	Leysen; Nyakossi, Pletinckx, Ominami; Verlinden, Verstraete, Maziz (90+5' Traoré), George (73' Łakomy), Gil (73' Opoku); Kaba (73' Ikwuemesi), Maertens (83' Mijatović)	Prévot; Monticelli; Teklab; Terho	(yellow card) 42' Pletinckx; (yellow card) 90+5' Maziz; (yellow card) 90+6' Łakomy
18 January 2026; 19:15; Stayen; Sint-Truiden	Sint-Truiden	1–0	Oud-Heverlee Leuven	Leysen; Nyakossi, Pletinckx, Dussenne (80' Traoré); Verlinden (80' Akimoto), Verstraete (80' Schrijvers), George (46' Łakomy), Gil; Maziz, Kaba, Maertens (46' Ikwuemesi)	Jochmans; Ominami; Teklab; Vlietinck	(yellow card) 21' Maziz; (yellow card) 34' Maertens; (yellow card) 57' Verstraete; (yellow card) 86' Akimoto; (yellow card) 90+2' Ikwuemesi; (yellow card) 90+3' Nyakossi
18 January 2026; 19:15; Stayen; Sint-Truiden	9' Sebaoui (without assist)	1–0		Leysen; Nyakossi, Pletinckx, Dussenne (80' Traoré); Verlinden (80' Akimoto), Verstraete (80' Schrijvers), George (46' Łakomy), Gil; Maziz, Kaba, Maertens (46' Ikwuemesi)	Jochmans; Ominami; Teklab; Vlietinck	(yellow card) 21' Maziz; (yellow card) 34' Maertens; (yellow card) 57' Verstraete; (yellow card) 86' Akimoto; (yellow card) 90+2' Ikwuemesi; (yellow card) 90+3' Nyakossi
24 January 2026; 20:45; Den Dreef; Leuven	Oud-Heverlee Leuven	0–0	Union SG	Leysen; Dussenne, Pletinckx, Akimoto; Verlinden (78' Opoku), Schrijvers (72' George), Łakomy, Gil; Teklab (72' Traoré), Ikwuemesi (78' Kaba), Maziz (89' Maertens)	Radelet; Ominami; Terho; Vlietinck	(yellow card) 7' Gil; (yellow card) 46' Dussenne; (yellow card) 90+5' Kaba
1 February 2026; 19:15; Den Dreef; Leuven	Oud-Heverlee Leuven	2–2	Mechelen	Leysen; Dussenne (43' Ominami), Pletinckx, Akimoto; Verlinden (70' Maertens), Schrijvers (80' Verstraete), Łakomy, Gil (70' Opoku); Teklab, Ikwuemesi, Maziz (80' Traoré)	Radelet; George; Kaba; McAlinney	(yellow card) 35' Verlinden; (yellow card) 45+4' Łakomy; (yellow card) 66' Schrijvers
1 February 2026; 19:15; Den Dreef; Leuven	33' Schrijvers (pen.); 52' Ikwuemesi (Ominami)	1–0; 2–0; 2–1; 2–2	61' Servais (without assist); 79' Vanrafelghem (Boersma)	Leysen; Dussenne (43' Ominami), Pletinckx, Akimoto; Verlinden (70' Maertens), Schrijvers (80' Verstraete), Łakomy, Gil (70' Opoku); Teklab, Ikwuemesi, Maziz (80' Traoré)	Radelet; George; Kaba; McAlinney	(yellow card) 35' Verlinden; (yellow card) 45+4' Łakomy; (yellow card) 66' Schrijvers
7 February 2026; 20:45; Planet Group Arena; Gent	Gent	1–3	Oud-Heverlee Leuven	Leysen (69' Prévot); Teklab, Akimoto, Nyakossi, Pletinckx, Gil; Verlinden (77' Opoku), Schrijvers (68' Verstraete), Łakomy, Maziz (88' Maertens); Ikwuemesi (77' Vaesen)	Balikwisha; George; Ominami; Traoré	(yellow card) 32' Nyakossi; (yellow card) 57' Gil; (yellow card) 70' Maziz; (yellow card) 78' Vaesen; (yellow card) 89' Łakomy
7 February 2026; 20:45; Planet Group Arena; Gent	54' Goore (Skóraś)	1–0; 2–0; 2–1; 2–2	17' Nyakossi (Maziz); 25' Schrijvers (pen.) 70' Maziz (Verlinden)	Leysen (69' Prévot); Teklab, Akimoto, Nyakossi, Pletinckx, Gil; Verlinden (77' Opoku), Schrijvers (68' Verstraete), Łakomy, Maziz (88' Maertens); Ikwuemesi (77' Vaesen)	Balikwisha; George; Ominami; Traoré	(yellow card) 32' Nyakossi; (yellow card) 57' Gil; (yellow card) 70' Maziz; (yellow card) 78' Vaesen; (yellow card) 89' Łakomy
14 February 2026; 16:00; Den Dreef; Leuven	Oud-Heverlee Leuven	3–2	Dender EH	Prévot; Nyakossi, Pletinckx, Akimoto; Teklab (86' Opoku), Schrijvers (80' Verstraete), Łakomy, Gil; Verlinden (69' Vaesen), Ikwuemesi (80' Kaba), Maertens (86' Balikwisha)	Radelet; George; Ominami; Traoré	(yellow card) 81' Teklab; (yellow card) 90+1' Gil
14 February 2026; 16:00; Den Dreef; Leuven	16' Ikwuemesi (Maertens); 40' Łakomy (Verlinden) 90+5' Kaba (pen.)	0–1; 1–1; 2–1; 2–2; 3–2	7' Květ (Nsimba) 90' Nsimba (pen.)	Prévot; Nyakossi, Pletinckx, Akimoto; Teklab (86' Opoku), Schrijvers (80' Verstraete), Łakomy, Gil; Verlinden (69' Vaesen), Ikwuemesi (80' Kaba), Maertens (86' Balikwisha)	Radelet; George; Ominami; Traoré	(yellow card) 81' Teklab; (yellow card) 90+1' Gil
21 February 2026; 18:15; Jan Breydel Stadium; Bruges	Club Brugge	2–1	Oud-Heverlee Leuven	Prévot; Nyakossi, Pletinckx, Akimoto; Teklab (79' Vaesen), Schrijvers, Łakomy (74' Verstraete), Gil; Verlinden (74' Balikwisha), Ikwuemesi (79' Kaba), Maertens (63' Maziz)	Radelet; Dussenne; George; Ominami	(yellow card) 88' Gil
21 February 2026; 18:15; Jan Breydel Stadium; Bruges	53' Meijer (Forbs) 61' Tresoldi (Stanković)	1–0; 1–1; 2–1	55' Ikwuemesi (Schrijvers)	Prévot; Nyakossi, Pletinckx, Akimoto; Teklab (79' Vaesen), Schrijvers, Łakomy (74' Verstraete), Gil; Verlinden (74' Balikwisha), Ikwuemesi (79' Kaba), Maertens (63' Maziz)	Radelet; Dussenne; George; Ominami	(yellow card) 88' Gil
28 February 2026; 20:45; Constant Vanden Stock Stadium; Anderlecht	Anderlecht	5–1	Oud-Heverlee Leuven	Prévot; Nyakossi, Pletinckx, Akimoto; Teklab (46' Dussenne), Verstraete, Łakomy (62' Schrijvers), Gil (41' Opoku); Verlinden (62' Maertens), Ikwuemesi, Maziz (74' Kaba)	Jochmans; Balikwisha; George; Vaesen	(yellow card) 35' Verlinden; (yellow card) 46' Opoku; (yellow card) 63' Verstraete; (yellow card) 70' Dussenne
28 February 2026; 20:45; Constant Vanden Stock Stadium; Anderlecht	29' Pletinckx (o.g.); 47' Hazard (without assist); 52' Cvetković (Hazard); 71' Hazard (pen.); 90+4' Bertaccini (De Cat)	0–1; 1–1; 2–1; 3–1; 4–1; 5–1	7' Gil (without assist)	Prévot; Nyakossi, Pletinckx, Akimoto; Teklab (46' Dussenne), Verstraete, Łakomy (62' Schrijvers), Gil (41' Opoku); Verlinden (62' Maertens), Ikwuemesi, Maziz (74' Kaba)	Jochmans; Balikwisha; George; Vaesen	(yellow card) 35' Verlinden; (yellow card) 46' Opoku; (yellow card) 63' Verstraete; (yellow card) 70' Dussenne
7 March 2026; 16:00; Den Dreef; Leuven	Oud-Heverlee Leuven	0–1	Westerlo	Prévot; Nyakossi, Pletinckx, Akimoto; Teklab (62' Verlinden), Verstraete (87' Maertens), Schrijvers (79' Balikwisha), Gil; Vaesen (62' Kaba), Maziz, Ikwuemesi (79' Traoré)	Jochmans; George; Łakomy; Ominami	(yellow card) 45' Verstraete; (yellow card) 76' Schrijvers
7 March 2026; 16:00; Den Dreef; Leuven		0–1	4' Ikwuemesi (o.g.)	Prévot; Nyakossi, Pletinckx, Akimoto; Teklab (62' Verlinden), Verstraete (87' Maertens), Schrijvers (79' Balikwisha), Gil; Vaesen (62' Kaba), Maziz, Ikwuemesi (79' Traoré)	Jochmans; George; Łakomy; Ominami	(yellow card) 45' Verstraete; (yellow card) 76' Schrijvers
14 March 2026; 16:00; Stade du Pays de Charleroi; Charleroi	Charleroi	0–2	Oud-Heverlee Leuven	Prévot; Nyakossi, Pletinckx, Dussenne (80' Ominami); Akimoto, Verstraete (80' Kayo), Łakomy (46' George), Gil; Teklab (46' Verlinden), Ikwuemesi (89' Kaba), Maziz	Jochmans; Maertens; Opoku; Vaesen	(yellow card) 36' Gil
14 March 2026; 16:00; Stade du Pays de Charleroi; Charleroi		0–1; 0–2	70' Gil (Verlinden); 74' Dussenne (without assist)	Prévot; Nyakossi, Pletinckx, Dussenne (80' Ominami); Akimoto, Verstraete (80' Kayo), Łakomy (46' George), Gil; Teklab (46' Verlinden), Ikwuemesi (89' Kaba), Maziz	Jochmans; Maertens; Opoku; Vaesen	(yellow card) 36' Gil
22 March 2026; 18:30; Den Dreef; Leuven	Oud-Heverlee Leuven	1–0	Antwerp	Prévot; Nyakossi, Pletinckx, Dussenne (83' Opoku); Akimoto, Verstraete (83' George), Schrijvers, Teklab (63' Kaba); Verlinden (72' Maertens), Ikwuemesi (83' Vaesen), Maziz	Jochmans; Łakomy; Ominami; Traoré	(yellow card) 5' Dussenne; (yellow card) 84' Maziz; (yellow card) 90+2' Kaba
22 March 2026; 18:30; Den Dreef; Leuven	90' Kaba (Schrijvers)	1–0		Prévot; Nyakossi, Pletinckx, Dussenne (83' Opoku); Akimoto, Verstraete (83' George), Schrijvers, Teklab (63' Kaba); Verlinden (72' Maertens), Ikwuemesi (83' Vaesen), Maziz	Jochmans; Łakomy; Ominami; Traoré	(yellow card) 5' Dussenne; (yellow card) 84' Maziz; (yellow card) 90+2' Kaba

==== Europe Play-offs ====
Pos	Team	Pld	W	D	L	GF	GA	GD	Pts	GNK	STA	CHA	WES	ANT	OHL
3	Charleroi	10	5	2	3	12	8	+4	34	2–0	1–2	—	0–1	2–1	1–1
4	Westerlo	10	4	1	5	14	17	−3	33	1–2	1–2	2–0	—	2–4	3–3
5	Antwerp	10	4	1	5	12	16	−4	31	1–2	0–5	0–1	2–0	—	2–0
6	OH Leuven	10	1	3	6	9	17	−8	23	0–2	1–3	0–2	0–2	3–0	—

Source: Jupiler Pro League (in Dutch), Soccerway
Legend: Blue = home team win; Yellow = draw; Red = away team win.
Rules for classification: 1) Points; 2) Points without (possible) half points added due to rounding; 3) Regular season finishing position.

===== Results summary =====
Overall								Home						Away					
Pld	W	D	L	GF	GA	GD	Pts	W	D	L	GF	GA	GD	W	D	L	GF	GA	GD
10	1	3	6	9	17	−8	6	1	0	4	4	9	−5	0	3	2	5	8	−3

Source: Jupiler Pro League Ranking

===== Results by round =====
Round	1	2	3	4	5	6	7	8	9	10
Ground	H	A	A	H	H	A	A	H	A	H
Result	L	D	L	L	L	D	L	W	D	L
Position	6	5	6	6	6	6	6	6	6	6
Points	17	18	18	18	18	19	19	22	23	23

Source: Jupiler Pro League
A = Away; H = Home; W = Win; D = Draw; L = Loss; = European competition play-off

===== Matches =====
The play-off fixtures were unveiled on 23 March 2026.

Europe Play-offs
Match Details	Home team	Result	Away team	Lineup	Unused Subs	Bookings
4 April 2026; 18:15; Den Dreef; Leuven	Oud-Heverlee Leuven	1–3	Standard Liège	Prévot; Nyakossi, Pletinckx, Dussenne (86' Traoré); Akimoto, Verstraete (67' George), Schrijvers (67' Łakomy), Teklab; Maziz (76' Maertens), Ikwuemesi (67' Vaesen), Verlinden	Leysen; Kayo; Ominami; Opoku	
4 April 2026; 18:15; Den Dreef; Leuven	48' Teklab (Schrijvers)	1–0; 1–1; 1–2; 1–3	65' Eckert (Abid); 80' Pletinckx (o.g.); 90+7' Eckert (pen.)	Prévot; Nyakossi, Pletinckx, Dussenne (86' Traoré); Akimoto, Verstraete (67' George), Schrijvers (67' Łakomy), Teklab; Maziz (76' Maertens), Ikwuemesi (67' Vaesen), Verlinden	Leysen; Kayo; Ominami; Opoku	
12 April 2026; 16:00; Cegeka Arena; Genk	Genk	0–0	Oud-Heverlee Leuven	Prévot; Nyakossi, Pletinckx, Ominami; Akimoto, Schrijvers, George (69' Łakomy), Gil; Maziz (82' Maertens), Kaba (82' Ikwuemesi), Teklab (69' Verlinden)	Leysen; Balikwisha; Dussenne; Vaesen; Verstraete	(yellow card) 81' Łakomy; (yellow card) 90' Gil; (yellow card) 90+1' Prévot
18 April 2026; 16:00; Bosuilstadion; Antwerp	Antwerp	2–0	Oud-Heverlee Leuven	Leysen; Nyakossi, Pletinckx, Ominami; Teklab (76' Schrijvers), George (79' Łakomy), Verstraete, Gil; Maziz (79' Maertens), Kaba (66' Ikwuemesi), Verlinden (66' Vlietinck)	Prévot; Balikwisha; Dussenne; Vaesen	(yellow card) 24' (yellow-red card) 28' Gil; (yellow card) 61' (red card) 73' Verstraete; (yellow card) 85' Ikwuemesi
18 April 2026; 16:00; Bosuilstadion; Antwerp	51' Dierckx (Foulon); 89' Hamdaoui (Scott)	1–0; 2–0		Leysen; Nyakossi, Pletinckx, Ominami; Teklab (76' Schrijvers), George (79' Łakomy), Verstraete, Gil; Maziz (79' Maertens), Kaba (66' Ikwuemesi), Verlinden (66' Vlietinck)	Prévot; Balikwisha; Dussenne; Vaesen	(yellow card) 24' (yellow-red card) 28' Gil; (yellow card) 61' (red card) 73' Verstraete; (yellow card) 85' Ikwuemesi
21 April 2026; 20:30; Den Dreef; Leuven	Oud-Heverlee Leuven	0–2	Westerlo	Leysen; Nyakossi, Pletinckx, Dussenne (46' Ominami); Teklab, Schrijvers, Łakomy (76' Balikwisha), Vlietinck (70' Verlinden); Maziz, Vaesen (70' Kaba), Maertens (76' Ikwuemesi)	Prévot; George; Kayo; Opoku	(yellow card) 43' Maertens
21 April 2026; 20:30; Den Dreef; Leuven		0–1; 0–2	62' Ferri (Alcócer); 67' Ferri (without assist)	Leysen; Nyakossi, Pletinckx, Dussenne (46' Ominami); Teklab, Schrijvers, Łakomy (76' Balikwisha), Vlietinck (70' Verlinden); Maziz, Vaesen (70' Kaba), Maertens (76' Ikwuemesi)	Prévot; George; Kayo; Opoku	(yellow card) 43' Maertens
25 April 2026; 16:00; Den Dreef; Leuven	Oud-Heverlee Leuven	0–2	Charleroi	Leysen; Nyakossi, Pletinckx, Ominami; Teklab, Schrijvers, Kayo (76' Łakomy), Vlietinck (46' Gil); Maziz (77' Vaesen), Kaba (77' Ikwuemesi), Verlinden (77' Maertens)	Prévot; Akimoto; Balikwisha; George	(yellow card) 38' Kaba; (yellow card) 80' Schrijvers
25 April 2026; 16:00; Den Dreef; Leuven		0–1; 0–2	53' Bernier (Van Den Kerkhof); 69' Scheidler (Van Den Kerkhof)	Leysen; Nyakossi, Pletinckx, Ominami; Teklab, Schrijvers, Kayo (76' Łakomy), Vlietinck (46' Gil); Maziz (77' Vaesen), Kaba (77' Ikwuemesi), Verlinden (77' Maertens)	Prévot; Akimoto; Balikwisha; George	(yellow card) 38' Kaba; (yellow card) 80' Schrijvers
2 May 2026; 16:00; Het Kuipje; Westerlo	Westerlo	3–3	Oud-Heverlee Leuven	Leysen; Pletinckx, Nyakossi, Akimoto; Teklab, George (79' Kayo), Łakomy (69' Schrijvers), Gil; Traoré (46' Heremans), Kaba (69' Ikwuemesi), Vaesen (76' Maziz)	Prévot; Ominami; Opoku; Vlietinck	(yellow card) 20' Łakomy; (yellow card) 78' Gil; (yellow card) 85' Ikwuemesi
2 May 2026; 16:00; Het Kuipje; Westerlo	50' Sayyadmanesh (Reynolds); 52' Sakamoto (without assist); 68' Sayyadmanesh (pen.)	0–1; 0–2; 0–3; 1–3; 2–3; 3–3	10' Traoré (Kaba); 15' George (Traoré); 41' Vaesen (Gil)	Leysen; Pletinckx, Nyakossi, Akimoto; Teklab, George (79' Kayo), Łakomy (69' Schrijvers), Gil; Traoré (46' Heremans), Kaba (69' Ikwuemesi), Vaesen (76' Maziz)	Prévot; Ominami; Opoku; Vlietinck	(yellow card) 20' Łakomy; (yellow card) 78' Gil; (yellow card) 85' Ikwuemesi
8 May 2026; 20:45; Stade Maurice Dufrasne; Liège	Standard Liège	2–1	Oud-Heverlee Leuven	Leysen; Nyakossi, Pletinckx, Akimoto; Teklab (87' Kayo), George (79' Schrijvers), Łakomy, Opoku; Vaesen (79' Maertens), Kaba (73' Ikwuemesi), Traoré (73' Balikwisha)	Prévot; Bulut; Ominami; Souanga	(yellow card) 34' Vaesen; (yellow card) 45' Nyakossi
8 May 2026; 20:45; Stade Maurice Dufrasne; Liège	47' Lawrence (without assist); 69' Nielsen (Homawoo)	0–1; 1–1; 2–1	40' Nyakossi (without assist)	Leysen; Nyakossi, Pletinckx, Akimoto; Teklab (87' Kayo), George (79' Schrijvers), Łakomy, Opoku; Vaesen (79' Maertens), Kaba (73' Ikwuemesi), Traoré (73' Balikwisha)	Prévot; Bulut; Ominami; Souanga	(yellow card) 34' Vaesen; (yellow card) 45' Nyakossi
15 May 2026; 20:45; Den Dreef; Leuven	Oud-Heverlee Leuven	3–0	Antwerp	Leysen; Ominami, Pletinckx, Akimoto; Teklab (87' Gil), Schrijvers, Verstraete (75' George), Opoku; Traoré (86' Balikwisha), Vaesen (70' Kaba), Maziz (70' Maertens)	Prévot; Ikwuemesi; Kayo; Souanga	(yellow card) 29' Teklab
15 May 2026; 20:45; Den Dreef; Leuven	34' Traoré (without assist); 43' Schrijvers (Maziz); 53' Teklab (Opoku)	1–0; 2–0; 3–0		Leysen; Ominami, Pletinckx, Akimoto; Teklab (87' Gil), Schrijvers, Verstraete (75' George), Opoku; Traoré (86' Balikwisha), Vaesen (70' Kaba), Maziz (70' Maertens)	Prévot; Ikwuemesi; Kayo; Souanga	(yellow card) 29' Teklab
19 May 2026; 20:30; Stade du Pays de Charleroi; Charleroi	Charleroi	1–1	Oud-Heverlee Leuven	Leysen; Ominami, Pletinckx, Souanga; Teklab, George (83' Łakomy), Schrijvers (64' Kayo), Opoku; Traoré (73' Kaba), Vaesen (73' Ikwuemesi), Balikwisha (64' Maziz)	Prévot; Gil; Maertens; Nyakossi	
19 May 2026; 20:30; Stade du Pays de Charleroi; Charleroi	48' Scheidler (Ousou)	0–1; 1–1	20' Souanga (without assist)	Leysen; Ominami, Pletinckx, Souanga; Teklab, George (83' Łakomy), Schrijvers (64' Kayo), Opoku; Traoré (73' Kaba), Vaesen (73' Ikwuemesi), Balikwisha (64' Maziz)	Prévot; Gil; Maertens; Nyakossi	
23 May 2026; 20:45; Den Dreef; Leuven	Oud-Heverlee Leuven	0–2	Genk	Leysen; Ominami, Pletinckx, Nyakossi (81' Ikwuemesi); Akimoto, Schrijvers, Łakomy, Opoku (46' Gil); Traoré (64' Maziz), Vaesen (46' Kaba), Maertens (76' George)	Prévot; Balikwisha; Kayo; Souanga	
23 May 2026; 20:45; Den Dreef; Leuven		0–1; 0–2	16' Itō (Medina); 33' Yokoyama (El Ouahdi)	Leysen; Ominami, Pletinckx, Nyakossi (81' Ikwuemesi); Akimoto, Schrijvers, Łakomy, Opoku (46' Gil); Traoré (64' Maziz), Vaesen (46' Kaba), Maertens (76' George)	Prévot; Balikwisha; Kayo; Souanga	

=== Belgian Cup ===
==== Results ====
2025–26 Belgian Cup
Match Details	Home team	Result	Away team	Lineup	Unused Subs	Bookings
7th Round
30 October 2025; 20:30; Stade du Pairay; Seraing	Seraing	1–3	Oud-Heverlee Leuven	Prévot; Nyakossi, Dussenne, Pletinckx; Akimoto, George, Maziz (67' Mijatović), Łakomy (76' Verstraete), Opoku (46' Gil); Kaba (67' Ikwuemesi), Verlinden (46' Traoré)	Leysen; McAlinney; Teklab; Terho	(yellow card) 24' Opoku; (yellow card) 25' Verlinden; (yellow card) 73' Łakomy
30 October 2025; 20:30; Stade du Pairay; Seraing	26' Maziz (o.g.)	0–1; 1–1; 1–2; 1–3	10' Kaba (Akimoto) 62' Kaba (without assist); 90+2' Traoré (without assist)	Prévot; Nyakossi, Dussenne, Pletinckx; Akimoto, George, Maziz (67' Mijatović), Łakomy (76' Verstraete), Opoku (46' Gil); Kaba (67' Ikwuemesi), Verlinden (46' Traoré)	Leysen; McAlinney; Teklab; Terho	(yellow card) 24' Opoku; (yellow card) 25' Verlinden; (yellow card) 73' Łakomy
8th Round
3 December 2025; 20:30; Den Dreef; Leuven	Oud-Heverlee Leuven	1–2	Club Brugge	Prévot; Dussenne, Pletinckx, Ominami (86' Ikwuemesi); Verlinden (80' Terho), George (60' Maertens), Maziz, Łakomy, Gil (60' Opoku); Kaba, Mijatović (60' Traoré)	Leysen; Nyakossi; Teklab; Verstraete	
3 December 2025; 20:30; Den Dreef; Leuven	67' Kaba (without assist)	0–1; 1–1; 1–2	33' Vetlesen (Stanković) 83' Tzolis (pen.)	Prévot; Dussenne, Pletinckx, Ominami (86' Ikwuemesi); Verlinden (80' Terho), George (60' Maertens), Maziz, Łakomy, Gil (60' Opoku); Kaba, Mijatović (60' Traoré)	Leysen; Nyakossi; Teklab; Verstraete	

== Squad statistics ==
Includes only competitive matches.

=== Appearances ===
Players with no appearances are not included in the list.

No.	Pos.	Nat.	Name	Belgian Pro League Regular season			Belgian Pro League Playoffs			Belgian Cup			Total		
No.	Pos.	Nat.	Name	Starts	Sub	Unused Sub	Starts	Sub	Unused Sub	Starts	Sub	Unused Sub	Starts	Sub	Unused Sub
1	GK	(Belgium)	Tobe Leysen	24	0	0	8	0	2	0	0	2	32	0	4
3	DF	(Belgium)	Noë Dussenne	20	1	1	2	0	2	2	0	0	24	1	3
4	MF	(Belgium)	Birger Verstraete	15	8	2	3	0	1	0	1	1	18	9	4
5	DF	(Japan)	Takuma Ominami	12	3	11	6	1	3	1	0	0	19	4	14
6	MF	(Belgium)	Wouter George	7	9	11	5	3	2	2	0	0	14	12	13
7	MF	(Belgium)	Thibaud Verlinden	14	7	4	3	2	0	2	0	0	19	9	4
8	MF	(Belgium)	Siebe Schrijvers	18	2	0	7	3	0	0	0	0	25	5	0
9	MF	(Guinea)	Abdoul Karim Traoré	6	13	8	5	1	0	0	2	0	11	16	8
10	MF	(France)	Youssef Maziz	18	9	1	6	3	0	2	0	0	26	12	1
14	MF	(Germany)	Henok Teklab	12	4	8	9	0	0	0	0	2	21	4	10
15	DF	(Croatia)	Viktor Damjanić	0	0	1	0	0	0	0	0	0	0	0	1
16	GK	(France)	Maxence Prévot	6	1	20	2	0	8	2	0	0	10	1	28
17	MF	(Belgium)	Kyan Vaesen	1	4	2	6	2	2	0	0	0	7	6	4
19	FW	(Nigeria)	Chukwubuikem Ikwuemesi	19	6	0	1	8	1	0	2	0	20	16	1
21	MF	(Democratic Republic of the Congo)	William Balikwisha	2	5	3	1	3	4	0	0	0	3	8	7
24	MF	(Poland)	Łukasz Łakomy	21	2	2	4	5	0	2	0	0	27	7	2
27	DF	(Spain)	Óscar Gil	26	1	0	3	3	1	1	1	0	30	5	1
28	DF	(Belgium)	Ewoud Pletinckx	30	0	0	10	0	0	2	0	0	42	0	0
30	MF	(Japan)	Takahiro Akimoto	24	1	0	6	0	1	1	0	0	31	1	1
33	MF	(Belgium)	Mathieu Maertens	10	17	1	2	6	1	0	1	0	12	24	2
34	DF	(Switzerland)	Roggerio Nyakossi	18	1	9	8	0	1	1	0	1	27	1	11
39	FW	(Guinea)	Sory Kaba	11	10	1	5	4	0	2	0	0	18	14	1
40	DF	(Belgium)	Roméo Monticelli	0	0	2	0	0	0	0	0	0	0	0	2
42	MF	(Turkey)	Hasan Bulut	0	0	0	0	0	1	0	0	0	0	0	1
43	DF	(Republic of Ireland)	Liam McAlinney	0	0	3	0	0	0	0	0	1	0	0	4
48	MF	(United States)	Bryang Kayo	0	1	0	1	3	4	0	0	0	1	4	4
60	MF	(Morocco)	Mohamed Yassine Azzouz	0	0	1	0	0	0	0	0	0	0	0	1
61	GK	(Belgium)	Owen Jochmans	0	0	5	0	0	0	0	0	0	0	0	5
63	DF	(Belgium)	Christ Souanga	0	0	2	1	0	3	0	0	0	1	0	5
72	MF	(Belgium)	Sebastian Murru	0	1	0	0	0	0	0	0	0	0	1	0
77	MF	(Belgium)	Thibault Vlietinck	2	4	4	2	1	1	0	0	0	4	5	5
80	MF	(Belgium)	Matteo Heremans	0	0	0	0	1	0	0	0	0	0	1	0
93	MF	(Belgium)	Milan Gigot	0	0	1	0	0	0	0	0	0	0	0	1
95	GK	(Belgium)	Théo Radelet	0	0	4	0	0	0	0	0	0	0	0	4
99	DF	(Belgium)	Davis Opoku	1	16	6	4	0	3	1	1	0	6	17	9
Players that have appeared this season, who are out on loan or have left OH Leuven
11	MF	(Finland)	Casper Terho (on loan to Sparta Rotterdam)	6	6	5	0	0	0	0	1	1	6	7	6
20	FW	(Belgium)	Nachon Nsingi (released to La Louvière)	0	6	0	0	0	0	0	0	0	0	6	0
22	FW	(Serbia)	Jovan Mijatović (loan return to New York City)	7	7	6	0	0	0	1	1	0	8	8	6
66	DF	(Japan)	Ayumu Ōhata (sold to Cerezo Osaka)	0	0	1	0	0	0	0	0	0	0	0	1

=== Goalscorers ===
Rank	Pos.	No.	Player	Belgian Pro League Regular season	Belgian Pro League Playoffs	Belgian Cup	Total
1	FW	39	(Guinea) Sory Kaba	6	0	3	9
2	FW	19	(Nigeria) Chukwubuikem Ikwuemesi	4	0	0	4
2	DF	34	(Switzerland) Roggerio Nyakossi	3	1	0	4
4	MF	8	(Belgium) Siebe Schrijvers	2	1	0	3
4	FW	9	(Guinea) Abdoul Karim Traoré	0	2	1	3
4	MF	10	(France) Youssef Maziz	3	0	0	3
4	MF	14	(Germany) Henok Teklab	1	2	0	3
4	MF	24	(Poland) Łukasz Łakomy	3	0	0	3
4	DF	28	(Belgium) Ewoud Pletinckx	3	0	0	3
10	MF	7	(Belgium) Thibaud Verlinden	2	0	0	2
10	DF	27	(Spain) Óscar Gil	2	0	0	2
12	DF	3	(Belgium) Noë Dussenne	1	0	0	1
12	MF	6	(Belgium) Wouter George	0	1	0	1
12	FW	17	(Belgium) Kyan Vaesen	0	1	0	1
12	MF	33	(Belgium) Mathieu Maertens	1	0	0	1
12	DF	63	(Belgium) Christ Souanga	0	1	0	1
Own Goals				1	0	0	1
Total				32	9	4	45

=== Assists ===
Rank	Pos.	No.	Player	Belgian Pro League Regular season	Belgian Pro League Playoffs	Belgian Cup	Total
1	MF	7	(Belgium) Thibaud Verlinden	4	0	0	4
1	MF	8	(Belgium) Siebe Schrijvers	3	1	0	4
1	MF	10	(France) Youssef Maziz	3	1	0	4
4	MF	24	(Poland) Łukasz Łakomy	3	0	0	3
4	MF	33	(Belgium) Mathieu Maertens	3	0	0	3
6	FW	39	(Guinea) Sory Kaba	1	1	0	2
6	MF	99	(Belgium) Davis Opoku	1	1	0	2
8	DF	5	(Japan) Takuma Ominami	1	0	0	1
8	MF	6	(Belgium) Wouter George	1	0	0	1
8	FW	9	(Guinea) Abdoul Karim Traoré	0	1	0	1
8	FW	22	(Serbia) Jovan Mijatović	1	0	0	1
8	DF	27	(Spain) Óscar Gil	0	1	0	1
8	MF	30	(Japan) Takahiro Akimoto	0	0	1	1
Total Goals With Assists				21	6	1	28
No Assist
Penalties				3	0	0	3
Own Goals				1	0	0	1
Without Assist				7	3	3	13
Total Goals Without Assist				11	3	3	17

=== Clean sheets ===
No.	Player	Belgian Pro League Regular season	Belgian Pro League Playoffs	Belgian Cup	Total clean sheets	% Clean sheet games	Goals conceded	Avg minutes between conceding
1	(Belgium) Tobe Leysen	6	1	—N/a	7	21.97 %	47	61
16	(France) Maxence Prévot	3	1	0	4	39.43 %	16	57.06
61	(Belgium) Owen Jochmans	—N/a	—N/a	—N/a	—N/a	—N/a	—N/a	—N/a
95	(Belgium) Théo Radelet	—N/a	—N/a	—N/a	—N/a	—N/a	—N/a	—N/a
