= Łukasz Łakomy =

Polish footballer

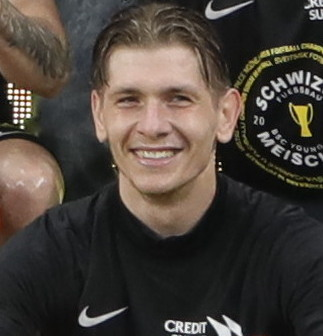
- Łakomy with Young Boys in 2024

Personal information
- Full name: Łukasz Łakomy
- Date of birth: 18 January 2001 (age 25)
- Place of birth: Puławy, Poland
- Height: 1.81 m (5 ft 11 in)
- Position: Midfielder

Team information
- Current team: OH Leuven
- Number: 24

Youth career
- –2014: Wisła Puławy
- 2014–2019: Legia Warsaw

Senior career*
Years	Team	Apps	(Gls)
2019–2021	Legia Warsaw II	25	(3)
2021–2023	Zagłębie Lubin	62	(5)
2021	Zagłębie Lubin II	19	(5)
2023–2026	Young Boys	59	(2)
2025–2026	→ OH Leuven (loan)	32	(3)
2026–	OH Leuven	0	(0)

International career
2015	Poland U15	1	(0)
2022	Poland U20	2	(0)
2022	Poland U21	2	(0)
- * Club domestic league appearances and goals as of 27 May 2026

Łukasz Łakomy (born 18 January 2001) is a Polish professional footballer who plays as a midfielder for Belgian Pro League club OH Leuven.

== Career statistics ==
As of match played 27 May 2026

Appearances and goals by club, season and competition
Club	Season	League			National cup (Note: Includes Polish Cup, Swiss Cup, Belgian Cup)		Europe		Other		Total	
Club	Season	Division	Apps	Goals	Apps	Goals	Apps	Goals	Apps	Goals	Apps	Goals
Legia Warsaw II	2018–19	III liga, group I	5	0	—		—		—		5	0
Legia Warsaw II	2019–20	III liga, group I	15	0	3	0	—		—		18	0
Legia Warsaw II	2020–21	III liga, group I	5	3	—		—		—		5	3
Legia Warsaw II	Total		25	3	3	0	—		—		28	3
Zagłębie Lubin	2020–21	Ekstraklasa	8	0	1	0	—		—		9	0
Zagłębie Lubin	2021–22	Ekstraklasa	20	1	1	0	—		—		21	1
Zagłębie Lubin	2022–23	Ekstraklasa	34	4	1	0	—		—		35	4
Zagłębie Lubin	Total		62	5	3	0	—		—		65	5
Zagłębie Lubin II	2020–21	III liga, group III	6	1	—		—		—		6	1
Zagłębie Lubin II	2021–22	III liga, group III	13	4	—		—		—		13	4
Zagłębie Lubin II	Total		19	5	—		—		—		19	5
Young Boys	2023–24	Swiss Super League	29	2	2	0	4 (Note: Two appearances in UEFA Champions League, two appearances in UEFA Europa League)	0	—		35	2
Young Boys	2024–25	Swiss Super League	28	0	2	0	7 (Note: Appearances in UEFA Champions League)	1	—		37	1
Young Boys	2025–26	Swiss Super League	2	0	0	0	0	0	—		2	0
Young Boys	Total		59	2	4	0	11	1	—		74	3
OH Leuven (loan)	2025–26	Belgian Pro League	32	3	2	0	—		—		34	3
Career total			197	18	12	0	11	1	—		220	19

== Honours ==
Zagłębie Lubin II

- III liga, group III: 2021–22

Young Boys

- Swiss Super League: 2023–24
