= Óscar Gil (footballer, born 1998) =

Spanish association football player

Óscar Gil Regaño
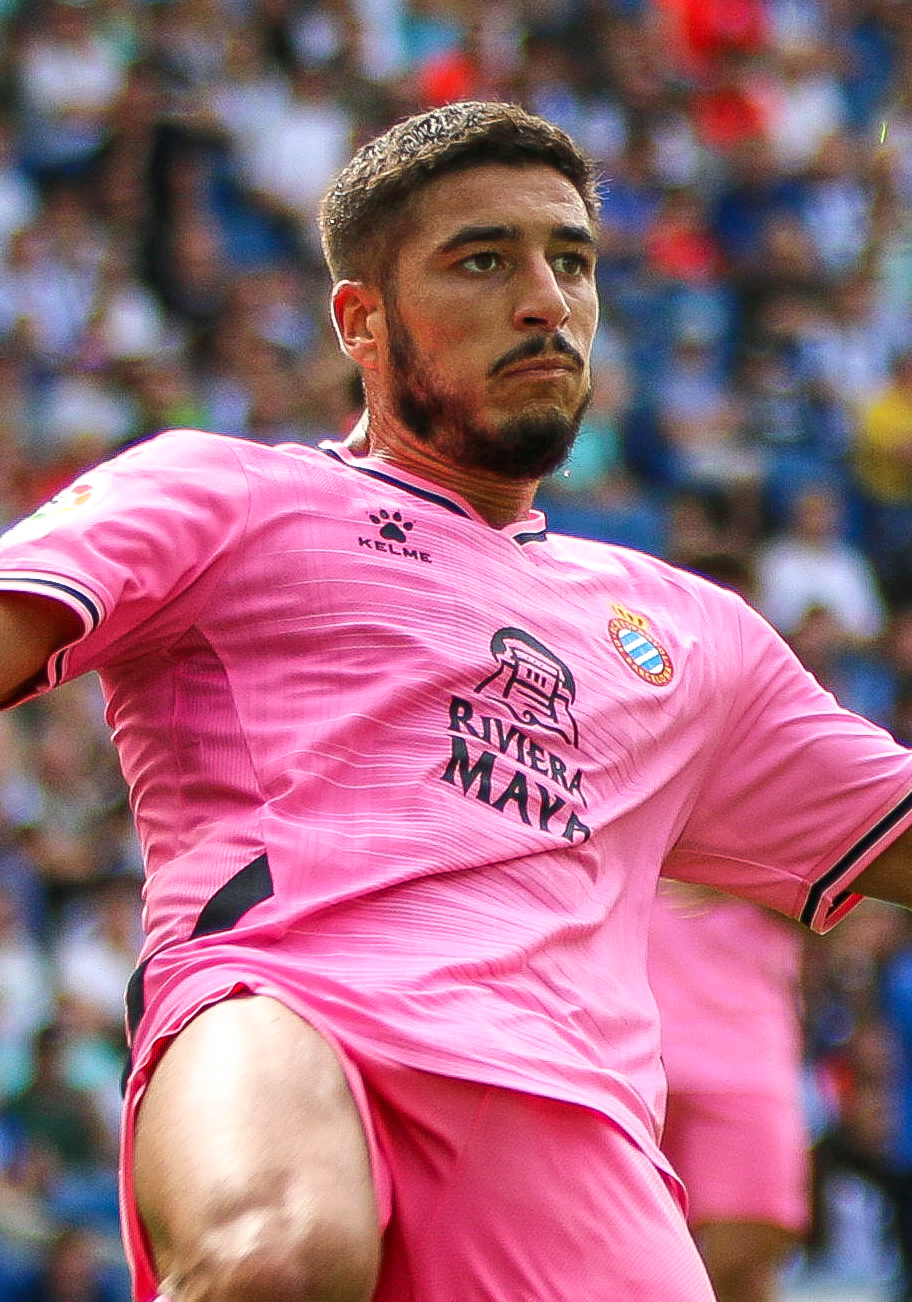
- Gil with Espanyol in 2022

Personal information
- Full name: Óscar Gil Regaño
- Date of birth: 26 April 1998 (age 28)
- Place of birth: Elche, Spain
- Height: 1.75 m (5 ft 9 in)
- Position: Right-back

Team information
- Current team: OH Leuven
- Number: 27

Youth career
- Pablo Iglesias
- Elche
- Kelme
- Elche

Senior career*
Years	Team	Apps	(Gls)
2015–2019	Elche B	71	(0)
2018–2020	Elche	33	(1)
2020–2024	Espanyol	106	(1)
2024–	OH Leuven	63	(4)

International career^{‡}
2021	Spain U21	1	(0)
2021	Spain U23	7	(0)
2021	Spain	1	(0)
Medal record
Men's football
Representing Spain
Olympic Games
Silver medal – second place	2020 Tokyo	Team
- * Club domestic league appearances and goals as of 19 September 2026 ‡ National team caps and goals as of 16:08, 7 August 2021 (UTC)

Óscar Gil Regaño (born 26 April 1998) is a Spanish professional footballer who plays as a right-back for Belgian Pro League team OH Leuven.

== Club career ==
=== Elche ===
Born in Elche, Valencian Community, Gil represented CD Pablo Iglesias, Elche CF and Kelme CF as a youth. He made his senior debut with Elche's reserve team on 23 August 2015, starting in a 1–0 Tercera División away win against FC Jove Español San Vicente.

Gil subsequently struggled with injuries in the following campaigns, only becoming a regular starter for the B-side during the 2017–18 campaign. He made his professional debut on 16 October 2018, starting in a 4–1 home defeat to Córdoba CF, for the season's Copa del Rey.

Gil made his Segunda División debut on 24 August 2019, starting in a 2–1 away defeat of AD Alcorcón, and subsequently became a regular starter under manager Pacheta.

Gil scored his first professional goal on 8 March 2020, netting his team's first in a 3–2 away success over Rayo Vallecano. He contributed with 36 appearances (3,018 minutes, play-offs included) during the campaign, as his side achieved promotion to La Liga.

=== Espanyol ===
On 7 September 2020, Gil agreed to a four-year contract with RCD Espanyol, recently relegated from the top tier, after the club activated his €500,000 buyout clause.

=== Oud-Heverlee Leuven ===
On 1 August 2024, Oscar Gil signed for OH Leuven, on a free two-year contract after leaving RCD Espanyol. At OH LeuvenGil mainly plays as a right-back. He became part of the club's defensive options and competed for a place in the starting eleven.

Oscar Gil made his debut for OH Leuven on 10 August 2024 against RSC Anderlecht. Gil came on as a substitute in the 63rd minute, replacing Thibault Vlietinck. The match was played at the Lotto Park in Brussels and ended in a 1-1 draw. His debut was the start of a new era of defense at OH Leuven.

==== Playing style at OH Leuven ====
Oscar Gil Plays as a right-back but can potentially operate in other defensive potions depending on the tactical system used by the team.

As a full-back, he combines defensive responsibilities with attack duties. When his team is in possession, he can advance along the right flank and provide an additional passing option for his teammates. His movement can also create space for other attacking players.

Without the ball, his responsibilities include defending his flank, tracking opposition attackers and helping maintain the defensive structure of the team.

His playing style reflects the modern role of the full-back, in which defenders are increasingly expected to contribute to both defensive and attacking phases of the game.

== International career ==
Due to the isolation of some national team players following the positive COVID-19 test of Sergio Busquets, Spain's under-21 squad were called up for the international friendly against Lithuania on 8 June 2021. Gil made his senior debut in the match as Spain won 4–0.

== Career statistics ==
=== International ===
As of match played 8 June 2021

Appearances and goals by national team and year
National team	Year	Apps	Goals
Spain	2021	1	0
Total		1	0

== Honours ==
Spain U23

- Summer Olympic silver medal: 2020

Espanyol

- Segunda División: 2020–21
