= Davis Opoku =

Belgian footballer (born 2007)

Personal information
- Date of birth: 29 October 2007 (age 19)
- Position: Right back

Team information
- Current team: OH Leuven
- Number: 99

Youth career
- –2014: Bierbeek
- 2014–2023: OH Leuven

Senior career*
Years	Team	Apps	(Gls)
2023–	OH Leuven U23	36	(0)
2024–	OH Leuven	30	(1)

International career^{‡}
2024–2025	Belgium U18	6	(0)
2025–	Belgium U19	9	(0)
- * Club domestic league appearances and goals as of 19 September 2026 ‡ National team caps and goals as of 14 September 2026

Davis Opoku (born 29 October 2007) is a Belgian professional footballer who plays as a right back for Belgian club OH Leuven in the Belgian Pro League.

== Career ==
On 12 May 2024, Opoku was selected for the first time for a match of OH Leuven, but remained on the bench in the 0–1 away win at Gent. The next season, he again featured primarily for the U23-squad playing at the third level (Belgian National Division 1), but on 24 November 2024 he made his first minutes as he came in for Thibault Vlietinck in a 1–1 home draw against Union SG. Opoku extended his contract with OH Leuven until 2028 on 29 March 2025.

== Personal life ==
Born in Belgium, Opoku is of Ghanaian descent. He was called up to the Belgium U19s for a set of 2026 UEFA European Under-19 Championship qualification matches in November 2025.
