= Takuma Ominami =

Japanese footballer (born 1997)

Takuma Ominami 大南 拓磨
Personal information
- Full name: Takuma Ominami
- Date of birth: 13 December 1997 (age 28)
- Place of birth: Kariya, Aichi, Japan
- Height: 1.84 m (6 ft 1/2 in)
- Positions: Centre back; right back

Team information
- Current team: V-Varen Nagasaki

Youth career
- Aichi FC
- –2012: Nagoya FC
- 2013–2015: Kagoshima Jitsugyo High School

Senior career*
Years	Team	Apps	(Gls)
2016–2019	Júbilo Iwata	29	(0)
2020–2022	Kashiwa Reysol	77	(5)
2023–2025	Kawasaki Frontale	41	(0)
2024–2025	→ OH Leuven (loan)	24	(1)
2025–2026	OH Leuven	22	(0)
2026–	V-Varen Nagasaki	0	(0)

International career^{‡}
2018	Japan U23	2	(0)
2019	Japan U22	2	(1)
2022	Japan	1	(0)
Medal record
Men's football
Representing Japan
Asian Games
Silver medal – second place	2018 Jakarta-Palembang	Team
EAFF Championship
Winner	2022 Japan	Team
- * Club domestic league appearances and goals as of 1 June 2026 ‡ National team caps and goals as of 20 August 2024

Takuma Ominami (大南 拓磨, Ōminami Takuma; born 13 December 1997) is a Japanese professional footballer who plays for J1 League club V-Varen Nagasaki as a defender.

== Career ==
Ominami joined J1 League club Júbilo Iwata in 2016. On 25 May, he debuted in the J.League Cup in a match against Kashima Antlers.

== Career statistics ==
As of start of the 2023 season.

Appearances and goals by club, season and competition
Club	Season	League			Emperor's Cup		J.League Cup		Total	
Club	Season	Division	Apps	Goals	Apps	Goals	Apps	Goals	Apps	Goals
Júbilo Iwata	2016	J1 League	0	0	1	0	1	0	2	0
Júbilo Iwata	2017	J1 League	0	0	2	0	3	0	5	0
Júbilo Iwata	2018	J1 League	7	0	3	0	4	0	14	0
Júbilo Iwata	2019	J1 League	22	0	2	0	5	0	29	0
Júbilo Iwata	Total		29	0	8	0	13	0	50	0
Kashiwa Reysol	2020	J1 League	22	0	0	0	3	0	25	0
Kashiwa Reysol	2021	J1 League	29	3	2	0	2	0	33	3
Kashiwa Reysol	2022	J1 League	26	2	2	0	3	0	31	2
Kashiwa Reysol	Total		77	5	4	0	8	0	89	5
Kawasaki Frontale	2023	J1 League	0	0	0	0	0	0	0	0
Career total			106	5	12	0	21	0	139	5

== Honours ==
Kawasaki Frontale

- Emperor's Cup: 2023

Japan

- EAFF Championship: 2022
