= Owen Jochmans =

Belgian footballer (born 2003)

Personal information
- Date of birth: 28 January 2003 (age 23)
- Place of birth: Leuven, Belgium
- Height: 1.85 m (6 ft 1 in)
- Position: Goalkeeper

Team information
- Current team: OH Leuven U23
- Number: 61

Youth career
- –2016: OH Leuven Youth
- 2016–2022: Gent Youth

Senior career*
Years	Team	Apps	(Gls)
2022–	OH Leuven U23	53	(0)
2024–	OH Leuven	1	(0)

International career
2019–2020	Belgium U17	9	(0)
2021	Belgium U19	1	(0)
- * Club domestic league appearances and goals as of 1 May 2026

Owen Jochmans (born 28 January 2003) is a Belgian professional footballer who plays as a Goalkeeper for Belgian club Oud-Heverlee Leuven in the Belgian Pro League.

== Career ==
At the start of the 2024–25 season, Jochmans was promoted to second goalkeeper at OH Leuven behind Tobe Leysen, taking place on the bench for nearly all games. Following the appointment of Chris Coleman as manager in early December 2024 however, experienced French goalkeeper Maxence Prévot was reinstated as main backup for Leysen, taking Jochmans' place on the bench for most of the matches from that point. On 16 May 2025 however, in the final home game of the season, Leysen was substituted with 20 minutes left to play to receive an ovation from the fans for his outstanding season, allowing Jochmans to make his official debut for the club after already having sat through 22 matches as unused substitute. Jochmans made an unfortunate error, allowing Westerlo to double their lead, OH Leuven would go on to lose the match 0–2.
