= Youssef Maziz =

French footballer (born 1998)

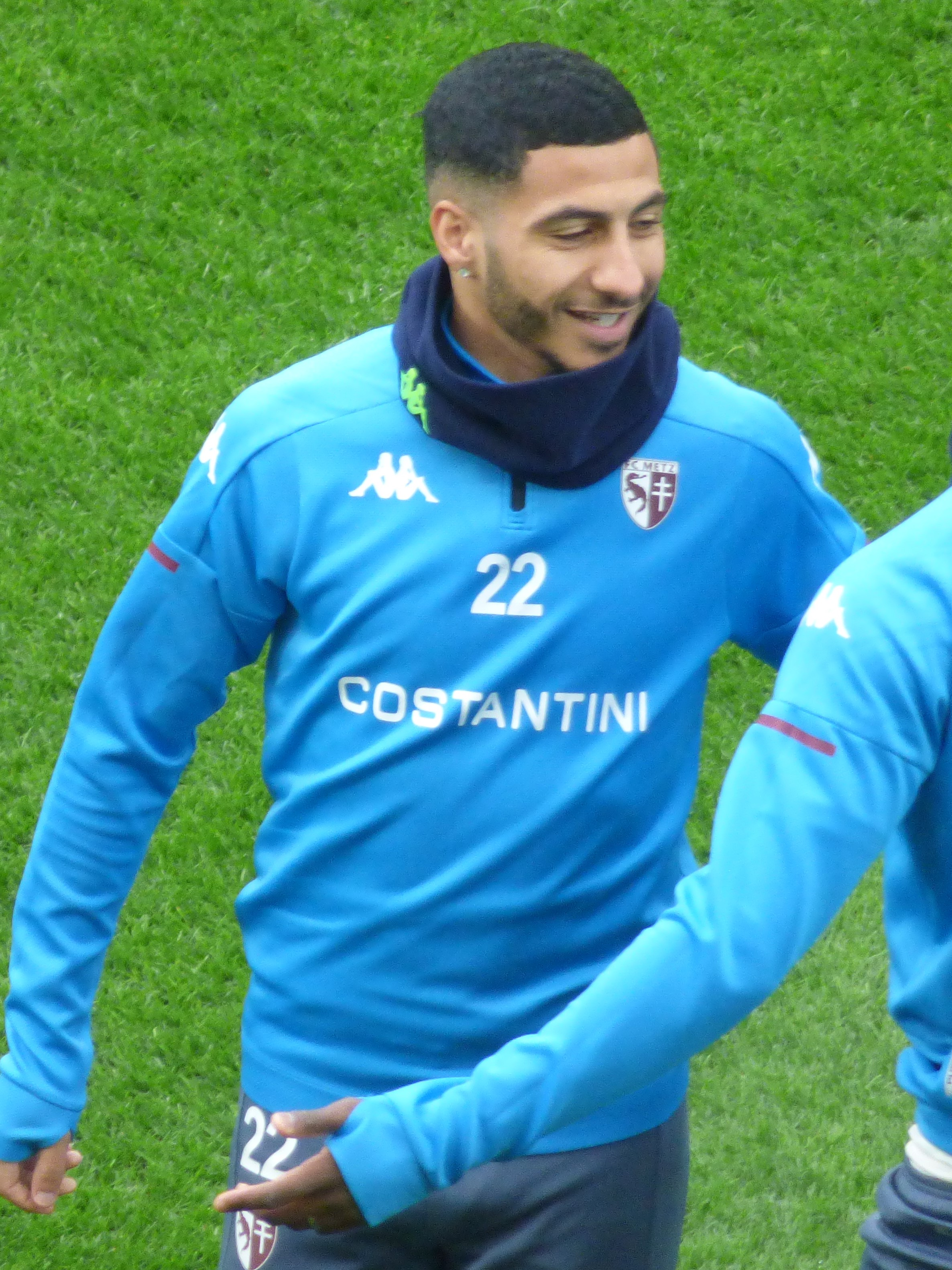
- Maziz in 2021

Personal information
- Date of birth: 24 June 1998 (age 28)
- Place of birth: Thionville, France
- Height: 1.80 m (5 ft 11 in)
- Positions: Attacking midfielder; winger

Team information
- Current team: Colorado Rapids
- Number: 88

Youth career
- 2004–2006: Thionville
- 2006–2011: Metz
- 2011–2013: Amnéville
- 2013–2017: Metz

Senior career*
Years	Team	Apps	(Gls)
2015–2020	Metz II	52	(15)
2017–2023	Metz	42	(9)
2018–2019	→ Avranches (loan)	29	(7)
2018–2019	→ Avranches II (loan)	2	(0)
2019–2020	→ Le Mans (loan)	13	(3)
2019	→ Le Mans II (loan)	1	(0)
2021–2022	→ Seraing (loan)	33	(8)
2023–2026	OH Leuven	107	(13)
2026–	Colorado Rapids	0	(0)

International career
2013	France U16	2	(0)
- * Club domestic league appearances and goals as of 25 May 2026

Youssef Maziz (born 24 June 1998) is a French professional footballer who plays as an attacking midfielder or a winger for Major League Soccer club Colorado Rapids.

== Club career ==
Maziz made his professional debut for Metz in a 5–0 Ligue 1 loss against Lyon on 26 February 2017.

On 26 June 2019, he agreed to join Le Mans, newly promoted to Ligue 2, on loan from Metz.

== International career ==
Born in France, Maziz is of Moroccan descent and has dual nationality. He is a former youth international for France.
