= Henok Teklab =

German footballer (born 1997)

Personal information
- Date of birth: 16 November 1998 (age 27)
- Place of birth: Frankfurt, Germany
- Height: 1.74 m (5 ft 9 in)
- Position: Winger

Team information
- Current team: OH Leuven
- Number: 14

Youth career
- Rot-Weiss Frankfurt
- 2015–2017: Germania Schwanheim

Senior career*
Years	Team	Apps	(Gls)
2017	Germania Schwanheim	1	(0)
2017–2018	Rot-Weiss Frankfurt	29	(9)
2018–2019	Hessen Dreieich	9	(0)
2019–2020	VfB Ginsheim	19	(2)
2020–2021	Bayern Alzenau	38	(5)
2021–2023	Preußen Münster	65	(13)
2023–2025	Union SG	28	(1)
2025–	OH Leuven	25	(3)
- * Club domestic league appearances and goals as of 1 June 2026

Henok Teklab (born 16 November 1998) is a German professional footballer who plays as a winger for OH Leuven.

== Career ==
Teklab is a youth product of Rot-Weiss Frankfurt and Germania Schwanheim. He began his senior career with Germania Schwanheim in the Hessenliga in 2017. That same summer, he returned to Rot-Weiss Frankfurt for a season, before moving to Hessen Dreieich for the 2018–19 season. He followed that up with year-long stints at VfB Ginsheim and Bayern Alzenau. On 28 June 2021, he transferred to Preußen Münster on a two-year contract. He spent two seasons with them in the Regionalliga from 2021 to 2023, with 25 goals in 65 games.

On 14 June 2023, Teklab transferred to the Belgian First Division A club Union Saint-Gilloise on a four-year contract. He made his senior and professional debut with Union Saint-Gilloise as a late substitute in a 4–0 Belgian First Division A loss to Mechelen on 19 August 2023.

== Personal life ==
Born in Germany, Teklab is of Eritrean descent.

== Career statistics ==
As of match played 29 March 2025

Appearances and goals by club, season and competition
Club	Season	League			National cup (Note: Includes DFB-Pokal, Belgian Cup)		Europe		Other (Note: Includes Hessian Cup, Westphalian Cup, Belgian Super Cup)		Total	
Club	Season	Division	Apps	Goals	Apps	Goals	Apps	Goals	Apps	Goals	Apps	Goals
Germania Schwanheim	2016–17	Verbandsliga Hessen-Mitte	1	0	–		–		–		1	0
Rot-Weiss Frankfurt	2017–18	Hessenliga	29	9	–		–		–		29	9
Hessen Dreieich	2018–19	Regionalliga Südwest	9	0	–		–		1 (Note: Appearances in Hessian Cup)	0	10	0
VfB Ginsheim	2019–20	Hessenliga	19	2	–		–		2	0	21	2
Bayern Alzenau	2020–21	Regionalliga Südwest	38	5	–		–		2	0	40	5
Preußen Münster	2021–22	Regionalliga West	37	7	2	0	–		6 (Note: Appearances in Westphalian Cup)	4	45	11
Preußen Münster	2022–23	Regionalliga West	28	6	0	0	–		2	2	30	8
Preußen Münster	Total		65	13	2	0	–		8	6	75	19
Union SG	2023–24	Belgian Pro League	21	1	3	0	6 (Note: Two appearances in UEFA Europa League, four appearances in UEFA Conference League)	0	–		30	1
Union SG	2024–25	Belgian Pro League	6	0	0	0	2 (Note: Appearances in UEFA Champions League)	0	1 (Note: Appearance in Belgian Super Cup)	0	9	0
Union SG	Total		28	1	3	0	8	0	1	0	39	1
Career total			188	30	5	0	8	0	14	6	215	36

== Honours ==
Union Saint-Gilloise

- Belgian Pro League: 2024–25
- Belgian Cup: 2023–24
- Belgian Super Cup: 2024
