= Bryang Kayo =

American soccer player

Personal information
- Full name: Bryang William Kayo
- Date of birth: July 27, 2002 (age 24)
- Place of birth: Montgomery Village, Maryland, U.S.
- Height: 6 ft 1 in (1.85 m)
- Position: Midfielder

Team information
- Current team: OH Leuven
- Number: 48

Youth career
- 2017–2019: D.C. United
- 2020: VfL Wolfsburg

Senior career*
Years	Team	Apps	(Gls)
2019	Loudoun United	3	(0)
2019	Orange County SC	0	(0)
2020–2023	VfL Wolfsburg II	8	(1)
2021–2022	→ Viktoria Berlin (loan)	11	(0)
2022–2023	→ 1. FC Nürnberg II (loan)	36	(8)
2022	→ 1. FC Nürnberg (loan)	2	(0)
2023–2025	FC Ingolstadt	24	(1)
2024–2025	→ VfL Osnabrück (loan)	30	(3)
2025–	OH Leuven	5	(0)
2026–	OH Leuven U23	1	(1)

International career
2019	United States U17	8	(1)
- * Club domestic league appearances and goals as of June 1, 2026

Bryang William Kayo (born July 27, 2002) is an American soccer player who plays as a midfielder for Belgian club OH Leuven.

== Career ==
=== USL Championship ===
Kayo joined D.C. United's academy system. Kayo made three appearances for Loudoun United, the reserve team of D.C. United before leaving the club. On September 9, 2019, Kayo signed with the senior team of fellow USL Championship side Orange County SC. Kayo made the bench five times for Orange County SC during the 2019 season, however, he never made his senior team debut.

=== VfL Wolfsburg ===
On July 13, 2020, it was announced that Kayo, along with fellow United States youth national teamer Kobe Hernandez-Foster, signed with VfL Wolfsburg of the German Bundesliga. It was announced that Kayo would begin playing with the team's reserve side, VfL Wolfsburg II.

==== Loan to Viktoria Berlin ====
On July 30, 2021, Kayo was loaned to newly promoted 3. Liga side Viktoria Berlin.

==== Loan to Nürnberg II ====
On January 31, 2022, Kayo moved on loan to 1. FC Nürnberg II.

=== FC Ingolstadt ===
On June 26, 2023, Kayo departed Wolfsburg and subsequently joined FC Ingolstadt. On August 13, 2024, Kayo joined VfL Osnabrück on loan with an option to buy.

=== OH Leuven ===
While Osnabrück decided to exercise the loan option, they immediately sold Kayo as on June 26, 2025, Kayo signed for Belgian Pro League team Oud-Heverlee Leuven until 2028.

== Personal life ==
Kayo is originally from Maryland and is of Cameroonian descent.

== Career statistics ==
As of October 12, 2020

Appearances and goals by club, season and competition
Club	Season	League			National Cup		Continental		Other		Total	
Club	Season	Division	Apps	Goals	Apps	Goals	Apps	Goals	Apps	Goals	Apps	Goals
Loudoun United	2019	USL Championship	3	0	0	0	–		–		3	0
Orange County SC	2019	USL Championship	0	0	0	0	–		–		0	0
VfL Wolfsburg II	2020–21	Regionalliga Nord	8	1	–		–		–		8	1
Career total			11	1	0	0	0	0	0	0	11	1
