= Wouter George =

Belgian footballer

Personal information
- Date of birth: 3 March 2002 (age 24)
- Place of birth: Leuven, Belgium
- Height: 1.73 m (5 ft 8 in)
- Position: Attacking midfielder

Team information
- Current team: OH Leuven
- Number: 6

Youth career
- OH Leuven
- 2016–2020: Gent

Senior career*
Years	Team	Apps	(Gls)
2020–2022	Gent	1	(0)
2022–2025	OH Leuven U23	31	(1)
2024–	OH Leuven	48	(3)

International career
2018–2019	Belgium U16	5	(0)
2017–2018	Belgium U17	12	(0)
- * Club domestic league appearances and goals as of 19 September 2026

Wouter George (born 3 March 2002) is a Belgian professional footballer who plays as an attacking midfielder for Belgian club Oud-Heverlee Leuven in the Belgian Pro League.

== Career ==
On 17 November 2020, George signed a professional contract with Gent until 2023. George made his professional debut with Gent in a 2-0 UEFA Europa League loss to Red Star Belgrade on 26 November 2020.
