= Roggerio Nyakossi =

Swiss footballer (born 2004)

Personal information
- Date of birth: 13 January 2004 (age 22)
- Place of birth: Geneva, Switzerland
- Height: 1.94 m (6 ft 4 in)
- Position: Centre-back

Team information
- Current team: OH Leuven
- Number: 34

Youth career
- 2012–2017: Meyrin
- 2017–2021: Servette

Senior career*
Years	Team	Apps	(Gls)
2021–2022	Servette	5	(0)
2022–2025	Marseille B	30	(0)
2025–	OH Leuven	32	(5)

International career^{‡}
2021–2022	Switzerland U18	3	(0)
2022	Switzerland U19	4	(0)
2024–	Switzerland U20	5	(0)
2026–	Switzerland	1	(0)
- * Club domestic league appearances and goals as of 17:04, 28 May 2026 (UTC) ‡ National team caps and goals as of 16 November 2026

Roggerio Nyakossi (born 13 January 2004) is a Swiss professional footballer who plays for Belgian Pro League club OH Leuven and the Switzerland national team.

== Club career ==
A youth product of Meyrin and Servette, Nyakossi signed his first professional contract with Servette on 4 November 2020. He made his professional debut with Servette in a 5–1 Swiss Super League loss to Basel 8 August 2021, coming on as a late sub in the 77th minute.

On 19 July 2022, Nyakossi signed with French Ligue 1 club Marseille.

On 27 January 2025, Nyakossi joined OH Leuven in the Belgian Pro League, signing a two-and-a-half-year contract. Nyakossi made his debut on 5 April 2025 in an away match against Westerlo, scoring for his club in a match that ended 2–2.

== International career ==
Nyakossi is a Swiss youth international, having represented the teams U18, U19 and U20 teams.

He was one of the 24 players who were called up with the Switzerland national team by head coach Murat Yakin for the 2026–27 UEFA Nations League B matches against Slovenia on 13 November and Scotland on 16 November 2026.

== Career statistics ==
=== International ===
As of match played 16 November 2026

Appearances and goals by national team and year
National team	Year	Apps	Goals
Switzerland	2026	1	0
Total		1	0

== Personal life ==
Born in Switzerland, Nyakossi is of Togolese descent.
