= Het Kuipje =

Multi-purpose stadium in Westerlo, Belgium

't Kuipje
- 't Kuipke
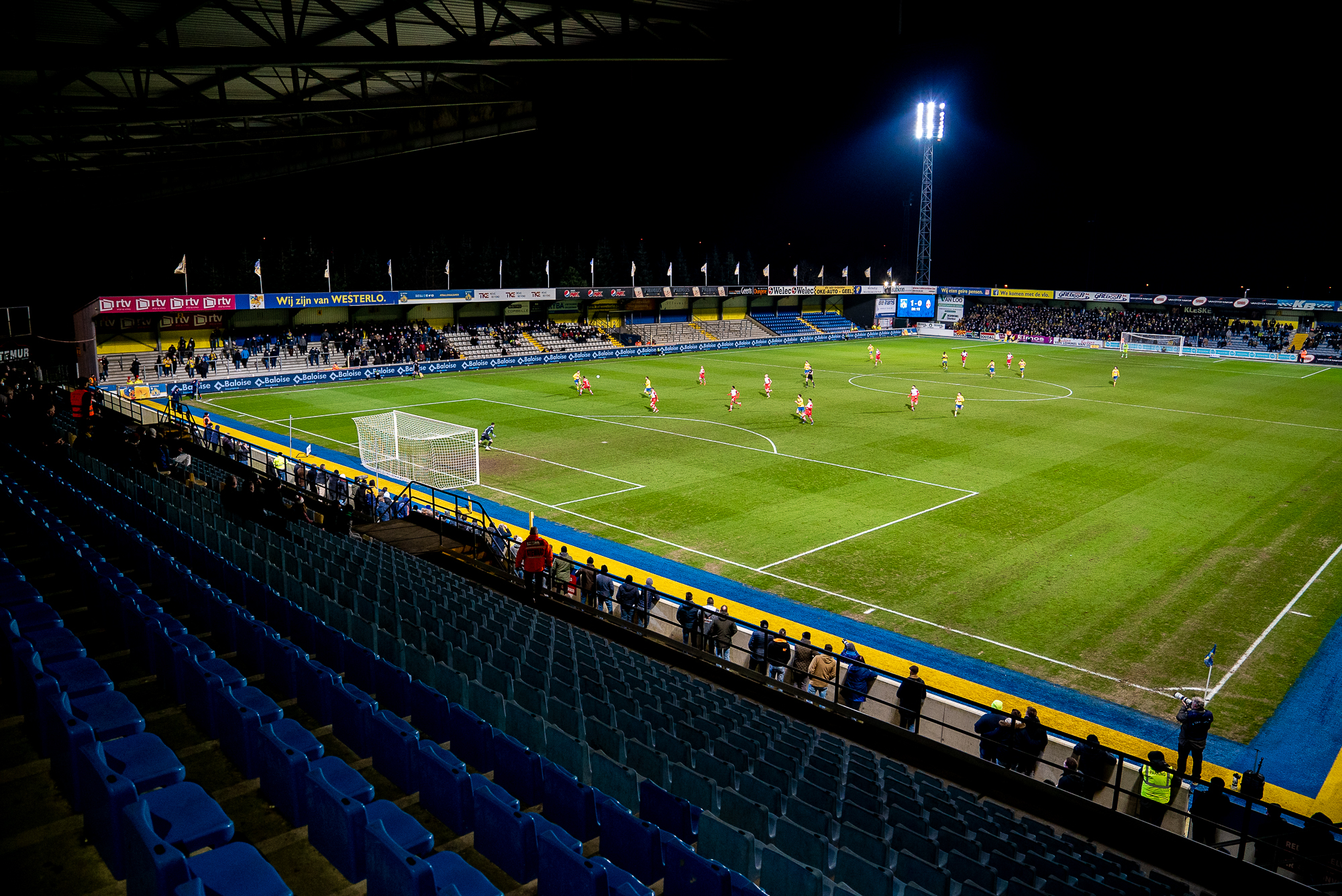
- 't Kuipje KVC Westerlo
- Interactive map of 't Kuipje
- Location: Westerlo, Belgium
- Coordinates: 51°05′41″N 4°55′44″E
- Capacity: 8,035

Tenant
- Westerlo

't Kuipje (Dutch pronunciation: [ət ˈkœypjə]) is a multi-purpose stadium in Westerlo, Belgium, used mostly for football matches; it is the home ground of Belgian First Division A football club Westerlo. The stadium has a capacity of 8,035.

Around the stadium there are 6 other pitches, used by youth teams and by the first team for training.
