= Kyan Vaesen =

Belgian footballer

Personal information
- Date of birth: 13 April 2001 (age 25)
- Place of birth: Belgium
- Height: 1.90 m (6 ft 3 in)
- Position: Forward

Team information
- Current team: Oud-Heverlee Leuven
- Number: 17

Senior career*
Years	Team	Apps	(Gls)
2019–2026	Westerlo	108	(15)
2020–2021	→ Thes Sport (loan)	3	(0)
2024–2025	→ Willem II (loan)	31	(4)
2026–	Oud-Heverlee Leuven	13	(1)

International career
2019–2020	Belgium U19	9	(0)
2023	Belgium U21	2	(1)
- * Club domestic league appearances and goals as of 31 May 2026

Kyan Vaesen (born 13 April 2001) is a Belgian professional footballer who plays as a forward for Belgian Pro League club Oud-Heverlee Leuven.

== Club career ==
On 25 July 2024, Vaesen joined Willem II in the Netherlands on a season-long loan.

== Honours ==
Westerlo

- Belgian First Division B: 2021–22
