= Christ Souanga =

Ivorian footballer (born 2006)

Personal information
- Full name: Moyé Christ Souanga
- Date of birth: 23 October 2006 (age 20)
- Place of birth: Ivory Coast
- Height: 1.85 m (6 ft 1 in)
- Positions: Centre-back; left-back

Team information
- Current team: OH Leuven
- Number: 63

Youth career
- 2015–2018: Tienen
- 2018–2023: OH Leuven

Senior career*
Years	Team	Apps	(Gls)
2023–	OH Leuven U23	28	(0)
2024–	OH Leuven	4	(1)
- * Club domestic league appearances and goals as of 19 May 2026

Moyé Christ Souanga (born 23 October 2006) is an Ivorian professional footballer who plays as a left-back for OH Leuven.

== Career ==
Born in the Ivory Coast, Souanga moved to Belgium at the age of 9 where he played with the youth academy of Tienen. After already having played 6 matches for OH Leuven U23 at the highest non-professional level (Belgian National Division 1), on 6 April 2024 Souanga made his professional debut for OH Leuven as he was subbed in to replace Jón Dagur Þorsteinsson, with about six minutes to play in the 0–0 draw away to Standard Liège.
