= Abdoul Karim Traoré =

Guinean footballer (born 2007)

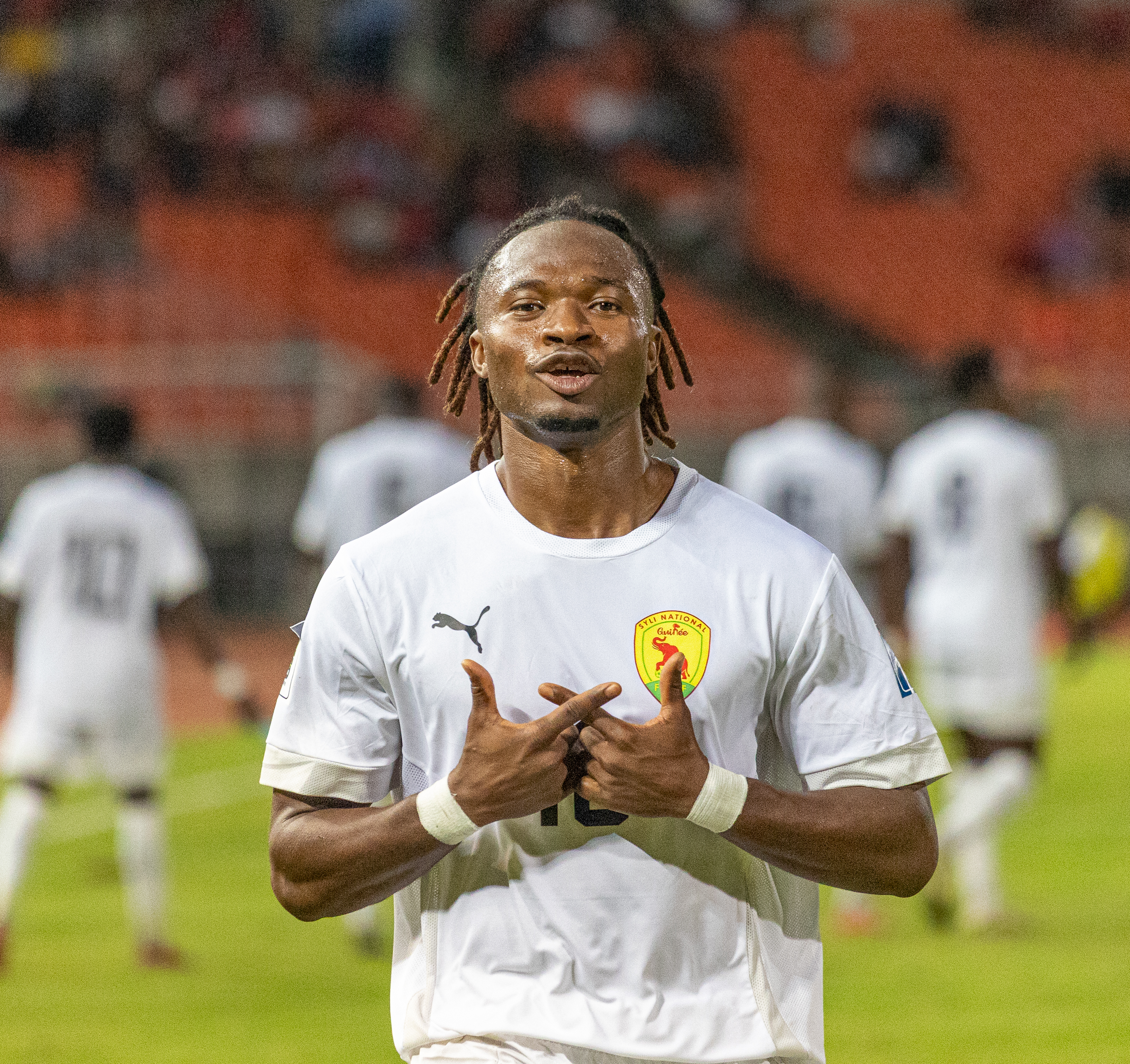

Personal information
- Date of birth: 12 January 2007 (age 19)
- Place of birth: Kankan, Guinea
- Height: 1.78 m (5 ft 10 in)
- Position: Forward

Team information
- Current team: OH Leuven
- Number: 9

Youth career
- 2021–2022: Bourg-en-Bresse Youth C
- 2022–2024: Bourg-en-Bresse Youth B
- 2022–2025: Bourg-en-Bresse Youth A

Senior career*
Years	Team	Apps	(Gls)
2024–2025	Bourg-en-Bresse	17	(3)
2025–	OH Leuven	31	(2)
2026–	OH Leuven U23	4	(1)

International career^{‡}
2025–	Guinea	4	(3)
- * Club domestic league appearances and goals as of 19 September 2026 ‡ National team caps and goals as of 19 September 2026

Abdoul Karim Traoré (born 12 January 2007) is a Guinean professional footballer who plays as a forward for Belgian Pro League club OH Leuven.

== Club career ==
After playing through the youth ranks at Bourg-en-Bresse for a few seasons, Traoré joined the first team in the second half of the 2024–2025 season. He appeared 17 times for the club from the Championnat National and made three goals in the progress. In the summer of 2025 he was signed by OH Leuven, where he made his professional debut on 27 July 2025 when he was in the starting lineup of a 2–2 home draw with Charleroi.

=== International ===
As of match played 14 October 2025

List of international goals scored by Abdoul Karim Traoré
No.	Date	Venue	Opponent	Score	Result	Competition
1	9 October 2025	Estádio do Zimpeto, Maputo, Mozambique	Mozambique	1–0	2–1	2026 FIFA World Cup qualification
2	9 October 2025	Estádio do Zimpeto, Maputo, Mozambique	Mozambique	2–1	2–1	2026 FIFA World Cup qualification
3	14 October 2025	Stade Mohammed V, Casablanca, Morocco	Botswana	1–1	2–2	2026 FIFA World Cup qualification
