= Noë Dussenne =

Belgian footballer

Personal information
- Date of birth: 7 April 1992 (age 34)
- Place of birth: Mons, Belgium
- Height: 1.91 m (6 ft 3 in)
- Position: Centre-back

Team information
- Current team: OH Leuven
- Number: 3

Youth career
- RAEC Mons

Senior career*
| Years | Team | Apps | (Gls) |
| 2009–2014 | RAEC Mons | 24 | (2) |
| 2012–2013 | → AFC Tubize (loan) | 28 | (1) |
| 2014–2015 | Cercle Brugge | 30 | (1) |
| 2015–2016 | Mouscron-Péruwelz | 38 | (6) |
| 2016–2018 | Crotone | 9 | (0) |
| 2017–2018 | → Gent (loan) | 4 | (0) |
| 2018–2019 | Mouscron | 28 | (1) |
| 2019–2023 | Standard Liège | 79 | (8) |
| 2023–2025 | Lausanne-Sport | 70 | (13) |
| 2025– | OH Leuven | 23 | (1) |

International career
| 2011 | Belgium U19 | 2 | (0) |
| 2012 | Belgium U20 | 1 | (0) |
- * Club domestic league appearances and goals as of 1 June 2026

Noë Dussenne (born 7 April 1992) is a Belgian professional footballer who plays as a centre-back for Belgian club OH Leuven.

== Club career ==
On 28 June 2023, Dussenne signed a three-year contract with Lausanne-Sport in Switzerland.

On 19 August 2025, he transferred back to his home country, joining OH Leuven on a three-year deal until 2028.
