= Viktor Damjanić =

Croatian footballer (born 2005)

Personal information
- Date of birth: 3 November 2005 (age 21)
- Place of birth: Šibenik, Croatia
- Height: 1.95 m (6 ft 5 in)
- Position: Defender

Team information
- Current team: OH Leuven U23
- Number: 15

Youth career
- Šibenik

Senior career*
Years	Team	Apps	(Gls)
2021–2023	Šibenik	1	(0)
2023–2025	Lokomotiva Zagreb	0	(0)
2024–2025	→ Jedinstvo Ub (loan)	32	(1)
2025–	OH Leuven	0	(0)
2025–	OH Leuven U23	13	(0)

International career^{‡}
2021–2022	Croatia U17	6	(0)
2022–2023	Croatia U18	7	(0)
2024–	Croatia U19	1	(0)
- * Club domestic league appearances and goals as of 8 May 2026 ‡ National team caps and goals as of 13 February 2024

Viktor Damjanić (born 3 November 2005) is a Croatian professional footballer who plays as a defender for Belgian club OH Leuven U23.

== Club career ==
On 7 November 2021 he played his first match for Šibenik, coming on as a substitute for Niko Rak in the 85th minute in a match against Rijeka. At the age of 16 years and 4 days he became the second youngest player in Croatian First Football League history.

== International career ==
Damjanić has played internationally for Croatia at under-17 level.
