= Thibault Vlietinck =

Belgian footballer

Personal information
- Date of birth: 19 August 1997 (age 29)
- Place of birth: Knokke, Belgium
- Height: 1.78 m (5 ft 10 in)
- Positions: Right back; right winger

Team information
- Current team: OH Leuven
- Number: 77

Youth career
- –2016: Club Brugge

Senior career*
Years	Team	Apps	(Gls)
2016–2022	Club Brugge	22	(1)
2020–2022	→ OH Leuven (loan)	33	(1)
2022–	OH Leuven	97	(2)

International career^{‡}
2012	Belgium U15	4	(0)
2012–2013	Belgium U16	8	(3)
2013–2014	Belgium U17	4	(0)
2014–2015	Belgium U18	6	(3)
2015–2016	Belgium U19	7	(0)
- * Club domestic league appearances and goals as of 1 June 2026 ‡ National team caps and goals as of 21:41, 6 September 2017 (UTC)

Thibault Vlietinck (born 19 August 1997) is a Belgian professional footballer who plays as a right back or a right winger for Belgian First Division A side OH Leuven.

== Club career ==
Vlietinck is a youth exponent from Club Brugge. He made his senior debut on 14 October 2016 in the Belgian Pro League against Charleroi. He replaced Jelle Vossen after 89 minutes.

On 12 August 2022, Vlietinck moved to OH Leuven on a permanent basis after playing at the club on loan for two seasons and signed a four-year contract.
