= 2024–25 Oud-Heverlee Leuven season =

Oud-Heverlee Leuven
2024–25 season
- Manager: Óscar García (until 22 November 2024); Hans Somers (22 November 2024 – 4 December 2024); Chris Coleman (since 5 December 2024)
- Stadium: Den Dreef
- Regular season: 11th
- Europe play-offs: 6th (12th overall)
- Belgian Cup: Quarter-finals

The 2024–25 season was the 23rd season in the history of the Oud-Heverlee Leuven, and the club's fifth consecutive season in the Belgian Pro League. In similar fashion as the previous season (although less dramatic), the club only managed to secure avoiding the relegation play-offs on the final matchday of the regular season. Overall, the club finished in 12th position. In addition to the domestic league, the team participated in the Belgian Cup, where they were eliminated in the quarter-finals, equalling their best ever achievement.

== Players ==
- This section lists players who were in Oud-Heveree Leuven's first-team squad at any point during the 2024–25 season and appeared at least once on the match sheet (possibly as unused substitute)
- The symbol ℒ indicates a player who is on loan from another club
- The symbol ¥ indicates a youngster, mostly playing for OH Leuven U23

No.	Nationality	Name	Position	Joined First Team	Previous club	Left First Team
Goalkeepers
1	(Belgium)	Tobe Leysen	GK	19 August 2023	(Belgium) Genk	–
16	(France)	Maxence Prévot	GK	13 August 2023	Sochaux	–
61	(Belgium)	Owen Jochmans^{¥}	GK	Summer 2024	Youth Squad	–
81	(Belgium)	Lander Gijsbers^{¥}	GK	Winter 2024–25	Youth Squad	–
95	(Belgium)	Théo Radelet^{¥}	GK	Summer 2024	Youth Squad	–
Defenders
3	(Belgium) / (Cameroon)	Antef Tsoungui^{ℒ}	CB	13 August 2024	Feyenoord	(30 June 2025)
5	(Japan)	Takuma Ominami^{ℒ}	CB	20 August 2024	(Japan) Kawasaki Frontale	(30 June 2025)
14	(Uruguay) / (Italy)	Federico Ricca	CB	12 August 2022	(Belgium) Club Brugge	–
20	(Morocco) / (Ivory Coast)	Hamza Mendyl	LB / LW	5 July 2022	(Germany) Schalke 04	16 January 2025
23	(Belgium) / (Democratic Republic of the Congo)	Joël Schingtienne	CB	Summer 2022	Youth Squad	28 August 2024
27	(Spain)	Óscar Gil	RB	1 August 2024	(Spain) Espanyol	–
28	(Belgium)	Ewoud Pletinckx	CB	17 June 2022	(Belgium) Zulte Waregem	–
30	(Japan)	Takahiro Akimoto	LB / LW	20 January 2024	(Japan) Urawa Red Diamonds	–
34	(Switzerland) / (Togo)	Roggerio Nyakossi	CB / DM	27 January 2025	Marseille	–
40	(Belgium) / (Italy)	Roméo Monticelli^{¥}	LB	5 July 2024	(Belgium) Charleroi	–
58	(Turkey) / (Denmark)	Hasan Kuruçay	CB	6 September 2024	Eintracht Braunschweig	–
63	(Belgium)	Christ Souanga^{¥}	LB	Winter 2023–24	Youth Squad	–
66	(Japan)	Ayumu Ōhata	LB / LW	29 January 2025	(Japan) Urawa Red Diamonds	–
93	(Belgium)	Milan Gigot^{¥}	CB	Summer 2024	Youth Squad	–
99	(Belgium)	Davis Opoku^{¥}	RB / RW	Playoffs 2024	Youth Squad	–
Midfielders
4	(Belgium)	Birger Verstraete	DM	10 July 2024	(Greece) Aris	–
6	(Netherlands) / (Democratic Republic of the Congo)	Ezechiel Banzuzi	CM	20 June 2023	(Netherlands) NAC Breda	–
7	(Belgium)	Thibaud Verlinden	LW	4 February 2025	Beerschot	–
15	(Ivory Coast)	Konan N'Dri	RW	21 July 2023	(Belgium) Eupen	2 February 2025
25	(Belgium)	Manuel Osifo	DM / CB	1 February 2024	(Belgium) Oostende	–
33	(Belgium)	Mathieu Maertens	CM / AM	12 July 2017	(Belgium) Cercle Brugge	–
55	(Belgium)	Wouter George	CM	Summer 2024	Youth Squad	–
56	(Belgium)	Mathéo Parmentier^{¥}	DM	Winter 2024–25	(Belgium) Gent	–
60	(Morocco) / (Belgium)	Mohamed Yassine Azzouz^{¥}	AM	Winter 2024–25	Youth Squad	–
67	(Belgium) / (Guinea)	Amadou Diallo^{¥}	RW	10 January 2025	(Belgium) RSCA Futures	–
77	(Belgium)	Thibault Vlietinck	RW	12 August 2020	(Belgium) Club Brugge	–
Forwards
7	(Iceland)	Jón Dagur Þorsteinsson	LW	4 July 2022	(Denmark) AGF	27 August 2024
8	(Belgium)	Siebe Schrijvers	CF / AM / RW	15 January 2021	(Belgium) Club Brugge	–
9	(Netherlands) / (Suriname)	Lequincio Zeefuik^{ℒ}	CF	14 January 2025	AZ Alkmaar	(30 June 2025)
10	(France) / (Morocco)	Youssef Maziz	AM / LW	29 August 2023	(France) Metz	–
11	(Belgium)	Nachon Nsingi	CF	Summer 2022	Youth Squad	31 August 2024
17	(Thailand)	Suphanat Mueanta^{ℒ}	RW	13 September 2023	Buriram United	31 October 2024
19	(Nigeria)	Chukwubuikem Ikwuemesi	CF	24 July 2024	Salernitana	–
21	(Democratic Republic of the Congo) / (Belgium)	William Balikwisha	AM / RW / LW	20 July 2024	Standard Liège	–
22	(Martinique)	Mickaël Biron^{ℒ}	CF	8 August 2024	RWD Molenbeek	1 January 2025
22	(Serbia)	Jovan Mijatović^{ℒ}	CF / RW / LW	31 January 2025	New York City	(30 June 2025)
23	(Serbia)	Stefan Mitrović^{ℒ}	LW	6 September 2024	Hellas Verona	(30 June 2025)
89	(Belgium) / (Nigeria)	Chike Van De Ven^{¥}	CF	Fall 2024	Youth Squad	

=== Did not appear on match sheet ===
The following players were listed as part of Oud-Heverlee Leuven's first-team squad during (part of) the 2024–25 season, but never appeared on the match sheet

No.	Nationality	Name	Position	Joined First Team	Previous club	Left First Team	Note
13	(Morocco) / (Belgium)	Sofian Kiyine	AM / LW	2 September 2022	(Italy) Lazio	26 August 2024	Contract terminated
30	(Ghana)	Emmanuel Toku	AM	30 January 2023	(Bulgaria) Botev Plovdiv	5 August 2024	Loaned to (Cyprus) AEL Limassol after matchday 2
52	(Belgium) / (Angola)	Richie Sagrado^{¥}	RB	Winter 2022–23	Youth Squad	3 August 2024	Sold to (Italy) Venezia after matchday 1

== Transfers ==
=== Transfers In ===
Date Announced	Position	Nationality	Name	From	Fee	Ref.
18 May 2024	MF	(Japan)	Takahiro Akimoto	Urawa Red Diamonds	Buy Clause Activated	
19 June 2024	FW	(Thailand)	Suphanat Mueanta	Buriram United	Loan Extended	
End of 2023–24 season	MF	(Ghana)	Emmanuel Toku	(Denmark) AaB	Loan Return	
10 July 2024	MF	(Belgium)	Birger Verstraete	(Greece) Aris	Undisclosed	
20 July 2024	FW	(Democratic Republic of the Congo)	William Balikwisha	Standard Liège	Undisclosed	
24 July 2024	FW	(Nigeria)	Chukwubuikem Ikwuemesi	Salernitana	Undisclosed	
1 August 2024	DF	(Spain)	Óscar Gil	Espanyol	Free	
8 August 2024	FW	(Martinique)	Mickaël Biron	RWDM	Loan	
13 August 2024	DF	(Belgium)	Antef Tsoungui	Feyenoord	Loan	
20 August 2024	DF	(Japan)	Takuma Ominami	Kawasaki Frontale	Loan	
6 September 2024	MF	(Serbia)	Stefan Mitrović	Hellas Verona	Loan	
6 September 2024	DF	(Turkey)	Hasan Kuruçay	Eintracht Braunschweig	Free	
14 January 2025	FW	(Netherlands)	Lequincio Zeefuik	AZ Alkmaar	Loan	
27 January 2025	DF	(Switzerland)	Roggerio Nyakossi	Marseille	Undisclosed	
29 January 2025	DF	(Japan)	Ayumu Ōhata	(Japan) Urawa Red Diamonds	Undisclosed	
31 January 2025	FW	(Serbia)	Jovan Mijatović	New York City	Loan	
4 February 2025	MF	(Belgium)	Thibaud Verlinden	Beerschot	Undisclosed	

=== Transfers Out ===
Date Announced	Position	Nationality	Name	To	Fee	Ref.
10 August 2023	MF	(Belgium)	Mandela Keita	Antwerp	Mandatory Buy Clause	
5 April 2024	GK	(Romania)	Valentin Cojocaru	Pogoń Szczecin	Buy Clause Activated	
7 May 2024	GK	(Belgium)	Nordin Jackers	Club Brugge	Buy Clause Activated	
16 May 2024	MF	(Belgium)	Desmond Acquah	Dender EH	Buy Clause Activated	
29 May 2024	MF	(Belgium)	Jo Gilis	Houtvenne	Undisclosed	
End of 2023–24 season	DF	(Belgium)	Alexandro Calut	Standard Liège	Loan Return	
End of 2023–24 season	MF	(Belgium)	Joren Dom	Free Agent	End of Contract	
End of 2023–24 season	FW	(Ghana)	Nathan Opoku	Leicester City	Loan Return	
End of 2023–24 season	GK	(Belgium)	Oregan Ravet	Free Agent	End of Contract	
End of 2023–24 season	DF	(Argentina)	Franco Russo	Ludogorets Razgrad	Loan Return	
15 July 2024	MF	(Japan)	Kento Misao	(Japan) Kashima Antlers	Undisclosed	
17 July 2024	DF	(France)	Florian Miguel	Burgos	Free	
20 July 2024	DF	(Belgium)	Pierre-Yves Ngawa	RFC Liège	Free	
26 July 2024	FW	(Norway)	Jonatan Braut Brunes	(Poland) Raków Częstochowa	Loan	
3 August 2024	DF	(Belgium)	Richie Sagrado	(Italy) Venezia	Undisclosed	
5 August 2024	MF	(Ghana)	Emmanuel Toku	(Cyprus) AEL Limassol	Loan	
26 August 2024	MF	(Morocco)	Sofian Kiyine	Free Agent	Contract Terminated	
27 August 2024	MF	(Iceland)	Jón Dagur Þorsteinsson	(Germany) Hertha Berlin	Undisclosed	
28 August 2024	DF	(Belgium)	Joël Schingtienne	(Italy) Venezia	Undisclosed	
31 August 2024	FW	(Belgium)	Nachon Nsingi	(France) Dunkerque	Loan	
31 October 2024	FW	(Thailand)	Suphanat Mueanta	Buriram United	Loan Terminated	
1 January 2025	FW	(Martinique)	Mickaël Biron	RWDM	Loan Terminated	
16 January 2025	DF	(Morocco)	Hamza Mendyl	Aris Thessaloniki	Undisclosed	
30 January 2025	FW	(Belgium)	Nachon Nsingi	Marítimo	Loan	
2 February 2025	MF	(Ivory Coast)	Konan N'Dri	Lecce	Undisclosed	

== Friendlies ==
=== Pre-season ===
29 June 2024 Friendly	OH Leuven (Belgium)	8–0	(Belgium) Bertem-Leefdaal	Oud-Heverlee
11:00	Maziz; Mendyl; Ricca; Maertens; N'Dri; Banzuzi; Nsingi			Stadium: Banqup Campus

3 July 2024 Friendly	Heist (Belgium)	0–8	(Belgium) OH Leuven	Heist-op-den-Berg
19:30			Schrijvers 18'; Misao 36'; Mueanta 52', 69'; Mendyl 72'; Maziz 82', 86' (pen.); Ngawa 89'	Stadium: Gemeentelijk Sportcentrum

6 July 2024 Friendly	OH Leuven (Belgium)	6–2	Ghana U20
14:30	Nsingi; Schrijvers; Maziz; Mboko		Goal

13 July 2024 Friendly	RKC Waalwijk (Netherlands)	2–4	(Belgium) OH Leuven	Waalwijk
14:30	Zawada 13', 25'		Maertens; Mueanta	Stadium: Side pitch of Mandemakers Stadion

20 July 2024 Friendly	OH Leuven (Belgium)	0–1	(France) Lens	Heverlee
15:00		Report	Saïd 90+13'	Stadium: Den Dreef

21 July 2024 Friendly	OH Leuven (Belgium)	0–1	Lokeren-Temse
11:00		Report	Janssen	Attendance: 0

=== During the season ===
7 September 2024 Friendly	OH Leuven (Belgium)	3–2	(Netherlands) Dordrecht
	unknown	Report	Van der Sluijs; Scholte	Attendance: 0

== Competitions ==
=== Overall record ===
Competition	First match	Last match	Starting round	Final position	Record							
Competition	First match	Last match	Starting round	Final position	Pld	W	D	L	GF	GA	GD	Win %
Belgian Pro League regular season	27 July 2024	16 March 2025	Matchday 1	11th	30	8	13	9	28	33	−5	26.67
Belgian Pro League Europe play-offs	28 March 2025	24 May 2025	Matchday 1	6th (12th overall)	10	1	5	4	11	19	−8	10.00
Belgian Cup	30 October 2024	7 January 2025	Seventh round	Quarter-finals	3	2	0	1	7	3	+4	66.67
Total					43	11	18	14	46	55	−9	25.58

Source: Soccerway

=== Pro League ===
==== League table ====
Pos	Team	Pld	W	D	L	GF	GA	GD	Pts	Qualification or relegation
9	Westerlo	30	10	7	13	50	49	+1	37	Qualification for the Europe play-offs
10	Charleroi	30	10	7	13	36	36	0	37	Qualification for the Europe play-offs
11	OH Leuven	30	8	13	9	28	33	−5	37	Qualification for the Europe play-offs
12	Dender EH	30	8	8	14	33	51	−18	32	Qualification for the Europe play-offs
13	Cercle Brugge	30	7	11	12	29	44	−15	32	Qualification for the Relegation play-offs

Source: Jupiler Pro League (in Dutch), Soccerway
Rules for classification: 1) Points; 2) Matches won; 3) Goal difference; 4) Goals scored; 5) Away matches won; 6) Away goal difference; 7) Away goals scored; 8) Play-off.

===== Results summary =====
Overall								Home						Away					
Pld	W	D	L	GF	GA	GD	Pts	W	D	L	GF	GA	GD	W	D	L	GF	GA	GD
30	9	12	9	31	35	−4	39	8	6	1	22	12	+10	1	6	8	9	23	−14

Source: Jupiler Pro League Ranking

===== Results by round =====
Round	1	2	3	4	5	6	7	8	9	10	11	12	13	14	15	16	17	18	19	20	21	22	23	24	25	26	27	28	29	30
Ground	A	H	A	H	A	H	A	H	A	A	H	A	H	A	H	H	A	H	A	H	A	A	H	H	A	H	A	H	A	H
Result	D	W	D	D	D	W	L	D	L	L	D	W	L	D	D	D	D	W	L	W	L	L	D	W	L	W	D	D	L	W
Position	7	3	6	10	9	6	10	11	12	14	12	11	12	13	13	13	12	10	12	11	11	12	12	10	12	9	9	9	11	11

Updated to match(es) played on 16 March 2025. Source: Jupiler Pro League
A = Away; H = Home; W = Win; D = Draw; L = Loss; = Champions' Play-offs; = Europe Play-offs; = Relegation Play-offs

===== Points breakdown =====
Points at home: 28
Points away from home: 9

Points against 2023/24 Champions' Play-offs teams (6): 9 (out of 36)
Points against 2023/24 Europe Play-offs teams (5): 13 (out of 30)
Points against 2023/24 Relegation Play-offs teams (2): 7 (out of 12)
Points against newly promoted teams (2): 8 (out of 12)

6 points: Charleroi
4 points: Beerschot, Dender EH, Standard Liège
3 points: Genk, Mechelen, Sint-Truiden
2 points: Anderlecht, Antwerp, Westerlo
1 point: Cercle Brugge, Gent, Kortrijk, Union SG
0 points: Club Brugge

===== Biggest & smallest =====
Biggest home win: 3–1 vs. Genk; 2–0 vs. Standard; 2–0 vs. Beerschot
Biggest home defeat: 0–1 vs. Club Brugge
Biggest away win: 0–2 vs. Charleroi
Biggest away defeat: 5–0 vs. Mechelen

Biggest home attendance: 9,930 vs. Anderlecht
Smallest home attendance: 7,418 vs. Genk
Biggest away attendance: 21,900 vs. Anderlecht
Smallest away attendance: 3,104 vs. Dender EH

===== Matches =====
The match schedule was released on 11 June 2024.

2024–25 Belgian Pro League
Match Details	Home team	Result	Away team	Lineup	Unused Subs	Bookings
Regular Season
27 July 2024; 18:15; Olympisch Stadion; Antwerp	Beerschot	0–0	Oud-Heverlee Leuven	Leysen; Schingtienne, Pletinckx, Akimoto; Mendyl (90'+1' Vlietinck), Schrijvers (68' Verstraete), Banzuzi, N'Dri; Maertens, Mueanta (58' Thorsteinsson), Maziz (68' Balikwisha)	Jochmans; Gigot; Nsingi; Osifo; Souanga	(yellow card) 66' Akimoto
3 August 2024; 18:15; Den Dreef; Leuven	Oud-Heverlee Leuven	3–1	Genk	Leysen; Schingtienne, Pletinckx, Akimoto; Mendyl (75' Osifo), Verstraete (75' Balikwisha), Schrijvers, Vlietinck (68' Ikwuemesi); Maertens (68' Thorsteinsson), N'Dri, Maziz (59' Banzuzi)	Jochmans; Mueanta; Nsingi; Souanga	(yellow card) 21' Akimoto; (yellow card) 70' Banzuzi
3 August 2024; 18:15; Den Dreef; Leuven	22' Maziz (Maertens); 36' Vlietinck (Pletinckx) 85' Thorsteinsson (Osifo)	1–0; 2–0; 2–1; 3–1	62' Arokodare (Sor)	Leysen; Schingtienne, Pletinckx, Akimoto; Mendyl (75' Osifo), Verstraete (75' Balikwisha), Schrijvers, Vlietinck (68' Ikwuemesi); Maertens (68' Thorsteinsson), N'Dri, Maziz (59' Banzuzi)	Jochmans; Mueanta; Nsingi; Souanga	(yellow card) 21' Akimoto; (yellow card) 70' Banzuzi
10 August 2024; 20:45; Constant Vanden Stock Stadium; Anderlecht	Anderlecht	1–1	Oud-Heverlee Leuven	Leysen; Schingtienne, Pletinckx, Akimoto; Mendyl (75' Banzuzi), Verstraete (85' Biron), Schrijvers, Vlietinck (63' Gil); Maertens (75' Ikwuemesi), N'Dri, Balikwisha (63' Maziz)	Jochmans; Nsingi; Osifo; Thorsteinsson	(yellow card) 51' Balikwisha; (yellow card) 62' Mendyl
10 August 2024; 20:45; Constant Vanden Stock Stadium; Anderlecht	36' Dolberg (Stroeykens)	1–0; 1–1	44' Maertens (Schrijvers)	Leysen; Schingtienne, Pletinckx, Akimoto; Mendyl (75' Banzuzi), Verstraete (85' Biron), Schrijvers, Vlietinck (63' Gil); Maertens (75' Ikwuemesi), N'Dri, Balikwisha (63' Maziz)	Jochmans; Nsingi; Osifo; Thorsteinsson	(yellow card) 51' Balikwisha; (yellow card) 62' Mendyl
18 August 2024; 16:00; Den Dreef; Leuven	Oud-Heverlee Leuven	1–1	Cercle Brugge	Leysen; Akimoto, Pletinckx, Schingtienne, Gil; Banzuzi, Verstraete, Schrijvers (55' Thorsteinsson); Maertens (55' Biron (78' Ikwuemesi)), N'Dri (78' Vlietinck), Maziz (65' Ricca)	Jochmans; Balikwisha; Mendyl; Tsoungui	(yellow card) 22' Schrijvers; (red card) 62' Gil; (yellow card) 74' Verstraete; (yellow card) 75' Akimoto
18 August 2024; 16:00; Den Dreef; Leuven	37' Maziz (N'Dri)	0–1; 1–1	16' Denkey (Gonçalves)	Leysen; Akimoto, Pletinckx, Schingtienne, Gil; Banzuzi, Verstraete, Schrijvers (55' Thorsteinsson); Maertens (55' Biron (78' Ikwuemesi)), N'Dri (78' Vlietinck), Maziz (65' Ricca)	Jochmans; Balikwisha; Mendyl; Tsoungui	(yellow card) 22' Schrijvers; (red card) 62' Gil; (yellow card) 74' Verstraete; (yellow card) 75' Akimoto
24 August 2024; 18:15; Het Kuipje; Westerlo	Westerlo	1–1	Oud-Heverlee Leuven	Leysen; Akimoto, Ricca, Pletinckx (45'+2' Ominami), Gil (85' Vlietinck); Maziz (85' Mendyl), Verstraete, Maertens (66' Schrijvers), Banzuzi, Balikwisha (66' Ikwuemesi); N'Dri	Jochmans; Biron; Mueanta; Tsoungui	(yellow card) 45+3' Maziz; (yellow card) 79' Verstraete
24 August 2024; 18:15; Het Kuipje; Westerlo	14' Mebude (Stassin)	1–0; 1–1	19' Balikwisha (Banzuzi)	Leysen; Akimoto, Ricca, Pletinckx (45'+2' Ominami), Gil (85' Vlietinck); Maziz (85' Mendyl), Verstraete, Maertens (66' Schrijvers), Banzuzi, Balikwisha (66' Ikwuemesi); N'Dri	Jochmans; Biron; Mueanta; Tsoungui	(yellow card) 45+3' Maziz; (yellow card) 79' Verstraete
31 August 2024; 20:45; Den Dreef; Leuven	Oud-Heverlee Leuven	2–0	Standard Liège	Leysen; Mendyl (77' Tsoungui), Ricca, Ominami, Vlietinck (46' Akimoto); Verstraete, Maziz, Schrijvers (6' Banzuzi); Balikwisha (87' Biron), Maertens, N'Dri (77' Ikwuemesi)	Jochmans; Gil; Mueanta; Osifo	(yellow card) 14' Verstraete; (yellow card) 23' Ominami; (yellow card) 49' N'Dri; (yellow card) 60' Ricca
31 August 2024; 20:45; Den Dreef; Leuven	32' N'Dri (Banzuzi); 63' Ominami (Maziz)	1–0; 2–0		Leysen; Mendyl (77' Tsoungui), Ricca, Ominami, Vlietinck (46' Akimoto); Verstraete, Maziz, Schrijvers (6' Banzuzi); Balikwisha (87' Biron), Maertens, N'Dri (77' Ikwuemesi)	Jochmans; Gil; Mueanta; Osifo	(yellow card) 14' Verstraete; (yellow card) 23' Ominami; (yellow card) 49' N'Dri; (yellow card) 60' Ricca
15 September 2024; 16:00; Stayen; Sint-Truiden	Sint-Truiden	2–1	Oud-Heverlee Leuven	Leysen; Akimoto (59' Mendyl), Ricca, Ominami, Gil (59' Tsoungui); Verstraete, Maziz, Banzuzi (87' Biron); Balikwisha (59' Ikwuemesi), Maertens (87' Mueanta), N'Dri	Jochmans; Kuruçay; Osifo; Vlietinck	(yellow card) 56' Maertens; (red card) 90+7' García
15 September 2024; 16:00; Stayen; Sint-Truiden	45'+2' Bertaccini (Zahiroleslam) 81' Brahimi (Yamamoto)	1–0; 1–1; 2–1	64' Banzuzi (Verstraete)	Leysen; Akimoto (59' Mendyl), Ricca, Ominami, Gil (59' Tsoungui); Verstraete, Maziz, Banzuzi (87' Biron); Balikwisha (59' Ikwuemesi), Maertens (87' Mueanta), N'Dri	Jochmans; Kuruçay; Osifo; Vlietinck	(yellow card) 56' Maertens; (red card) 90+7' García
22 September 2024; 19:15; Den Dreef; Leuven	Oud-Heverlee Leuven	1–1	Kortrijk	Leysen; Akimoto, Ricca, Ominami, Gil (60' Vlietinck); Verstraete, Maziz (69' Balikwisha), Banzuzi; Stefan Mitrović (60' Ikwuemesi), Maertens (69' Schrijvers), N'Dri (81' Biron)	Jochmans; Kuruçay; Mendyl; Osifo	(yellow card) 24' Maziz; (yellow card) 31' Gil; (yellow card) 87' Ricca
22 September 2024; 19:15; Den Dreef; Leuven	62' N'Dri (Verstraete)	0–1; 1–1	57' De Neve (without assist)	Leysen; Akimoto, Ricca, Ominami, Gil (60' Vlietinck); Verstraete, Maziz (69' Balikwisha), Banzuzi; Stefan Mitrović (60' Ikwuemesi), Maertens (69' Schrijvers), N'Dri (81' Biron)	Jochmans; Kuruçay; Mendyl; Osifo	(yellow card) 24' Maziz; (yellow card) 31' Gil; (yellow card) 87' Ricca
29 September 2024; 18:30; Ghelamco Arena; Ghent	Gent	3–0	Oud-Heverlee Leuven	Leysen; Akimoto, Ricca, Ominami (83' Mendyl), Vlietinck (46' Kuruçay); Banzuzi, Maziz, Schrijvers (46' Balikwisha); Stefan Mitrović (69' Biron), Maertens (69' Ikwuemesi), N'Dri	Jochmans; Gil; Mueanta; Osifo	(yellow card) 45+1' Schrijvers; (yellow card) 66' Banzuzi
29 September 2024; 18:30; Ghelamco Arena; Ghent	9' Dean (Brown); 13' Fadiga (Surdez); 78' Guðjohnsen (Gerkens)	1–0; 2–0; 3–0		Leysen; Akimoto, Ricca, Ominami (83' Mendyl), Vlietinck (46' Kuruçay); Banzuzi, Maziz, Schrijvers (46' Balikwisha); Stefan Mitrović (69' Biron), Maertens (69' Ikwuemesi), N'Dri	Jochmans; Gil; Mueanta; Osifo	(yellow card) 45+1' Schrijvers; (yellow card) 66' Banzuzi
5 October 2024; 16:00; Achter de Kazerne; Mechelen	Mechelen	5–0	Oud-Heverlee Leuven	Leysen; Gil (59' Vlietinck), Ricca, Kuruçay, Akimoto; Verstraete (71' Maziz), Maertens, Schrijvers (59' Banzuzi); Balikwisha, Ikwuemesi (21' Ominami), N'Dri (59' Mendyl)	Jochmans; Biron; Mitrović; Mueanta	(red card) 12' Ricca; (yellow card) 64' Verstraete; (yellow card) 74' Banzuzi
5 October 2024; 16:00; Achter de Kazerne; Mechelen	14' Ikwuemesi (o.g.); 17' Schoofs (Storm); 58' Lauberbach (Storm); 77' Nosa Dahl (Foulon); 90+3' Bafdili (Pflücke)	1–0; 2–0; 3–0; 4–0; 5–0		Leysen; Gil (59' Vlietinck), Ricca, Kuruçay, Akimoto; Verstraete (71' Maziz), Maertens, Schrijvers (59' Banzuzi); Balikwisha, Ikwuemesi (21' Ominami), N'Dri (59' Mendyl)	Jochmans; Biron; Mitrović; Mueanta	(red card) 12' Ricca; (yellow card) 64' Verstraete; (yellow card) 74' Banzuzi
20 October 2024; 16:00; Den Dreef; Leuven	Oud-Heverlee Leuven	1–1	Antwerp	Leysen; Akimoto, Ominami, Kuruçay, Osifo (75' Gil); Verstraete, Maertens (21' N'Dri), Banzuzi; Maziz (46' Mitrović), Ikwuemesi (85' Biron), Balikwisha (75' Schrijvers)	Jochmans; Mendyl; Mueanta; Vlietinck	
20 October 2024; 16:00; Den Dreef; Leuven	66' Mitrović (Banzuzi)	0–1; 1–1	34' Ondrejka (Renders)	Leysen; Akimoto, Ominami, Kuruçay, Osifo (75' Gil); Verstraete, Maertens (21' N'Dri), Banzuzi; Maziz (46' Mitrović), Ikwuemesi (85' Biron), Balikwisha (75' Schrijvers)	Jochmans; Mendyl; Mueanta; Vlietinck	
26 October 2024; 16:00; Stade du Pays de Charleroi; Charleroi	Charleroi	0–2	Oud-Heverlee Leuven	Leysen; Gil (80' George), Ricca, Kuruçay, Osifo; Verstraete, Schrijvers (80' Ominami), Banzuzi; Mitrović (62' Akimoto), Ikwuemesi (87' Maziz), Balikwisha (62' N'Dri)	Radelet; Biron; Mendyl; Mueanta	(yellow card) 32' Balikwisha; (yellow card) 58' Banzuzi; (yellow card) 75' Gil
26 October 2024; 16:00; Stade du Pays de Charleroi; Charleroi		0–1; 0–2	32' Ikwuemesi (Balikwisha); 45'+2' Ikwuemesi (Banzuzi)	Leysen; Gil (80' George), Ricca, Kuruçay, Osifo; Verstraete, Schrijvers (80' Ominami), Banzuzi; Mitrović (62' Akimoto), Ikwuemesi (87' Maziz), Balikwisha (62' N'Dri)	Radelet; Biron; Mendyl; Mueanta	(yellow card) 32' Balikwisha; (yellow card) 58' Banzuzi; (yellow card) 75' Gil
2 November 2024; 18:15; Den Dreef; Leuven	Oud-Heverlee Leuven	0–1	Club Brugge	Leysen; Akimoto, Ominami (86' Gil), Kuruçay, Osifo (86' Vlietinck); Verstraete, Banzuzi, Schrijvers (72' Biron); Balikwisha (72' Maziz), Ikwuemesi, N'Dri (59' Mitrović)	Jochmans; George; Mendyl; Souanga	(yellow card) 35' Balikwisha; (yellow card) 41' Kuruçay
2 November 2024; 18:15; Den Dreef; Leuven		0–1	32' Skov Olsen (Vanaken)	Leysen; Akimoto, Ominami (86' Gil), Kuruçay, Osifo (86' Vlietinck); Verstraete, Banzuzi, Schrijvers (72' Biron); Balikwisha (72' Maziz), Ikwuemesi, N'Dri (59' Mitrović)	Jochmans; George; Mendyl; Souanga	(yellow card) 35' Balikwisha; (yellow card) 41' Kuruçay
9 November 2024; 18:15; Van Roystadion; Denderleeuw	Dender EH	1–1	Oud-Heverlee Leuven	Leysen; Akimoto, Ominami, Kuruçay, Osifo (81' Biron); Verstraete, Maziz (72' Vlietinck), Banzuzi; Mitrović (46' Schrijvers), Ikwuemesi, Balikwisha (65' N'Dri)	Jochmans; George; Gil; Mendyl; Souanga	(yellow card) 9' Kuruçay; (yellow card) 18' Verstraete
9 November 2024; 18:15; Van Roystadion; Denderleeuw	43' Rodes (Scheidler)	0–1; 1–1	32' Maziz (Mitrović)	Leysen; Akimoto, Ominami, Kuruçay, Osifo (81' Biron); Verstraete, Maziz (72' Vlietinck), Banzuzi; Mitrović (46' Schrijvers), Ikwuemesi, Balikwisha (65' N'Dri)	Jochmans; George; Gil; Mendyl; Souanga	(yellow card) 9' Kuruçay; (yellow card) 18' Verstraete
24 November 2024; 16:00; Den Dreef; Leuven	Oud-Heverlee Leuven	1–1	Union SG	Leysen; Kuruçay, Ricca, Osifo; Akimoto (62' Mendyl), Banzuzi, Schrijvers, Vlietinck (89' Opoku); Mitrović (62' Balikwisha), Ikwuemesi, Maziz (52' N'Dri)	Jochmans; Prévot; George; Gil; Souanga	(yellow card) 26' Banzuzi; (yellow card) 79' Ricca
24 November 2024; 16:00; Den Dreef; Leuven	41' Schrijvers (pen.)	0–1; 1–1	11' Schrijvers (o.g.)	Leysen; Kuruçay, Ricca, Osifo; Akimoto (62' Mendyl), Banzuzi, Schrijvers, Vlietinck (89' Opoku); Mitrović (62' Balikwisha), Ikwuemesi, Maziz (52' N'Dri)	Jochmans; Prévot; George; Gil; Souanga	(yellow card) 26' Banzuzi; (yellow card) 79' Ricca
1 December 2024; 16:00; Den Dreef; Leuven	Oud-Heverlee Leuven	0–0	Anderlecht	Leysen; Akimoto, Ricca (71' Ominami), Kuruçay, Vlietinck; Verstraete, Maziz (71' N'Dri), Schrijvers; Mendyl (62' Balikwisha), Ikwuemesi, Mitrović	Jochmans; Prévot; George; Gil; Opoku; Souanga	(yellow card) 39' Vlietinck; (yellow card) 59' Schrijvers
7 December 2024; 18:15; Stade Maurice Dufrasne; Liège	Standard Liège	1–1	Oud-Heverlee Leuven	Leysen; Akimoto, Ricca, Kuruçay, Vlietinck (53' Gil); Verstraete (76' Schrijvers), Maziz, Banzuzi; Balikwisha (62' N'Dri), Ikwuemesi, Mitrović (76' Biron)	Prévot; George; Ominami; Osifo; Van De Ven	(yellow card) 45+3' Kuruçay; (yellow card) 58' Maziz; (yellow card) 83' Akimoto
7 December 2024; 18:15; Stade Maurice Dufrasne; Liège	45' Zeqiri (Camara)	1–0; 1–1	90'+4' Ricca (Banzuzi)	Leysen; Akimoto, Ricca, Kuruçay, Vlietinck (53' Gil); Verstraete (76' Schrijvers), Maziz, Banzuzi; Balikwisha (62' N'Dri), Ikwuemesi, Mitrović (76' Biron)	Prévot; George; Ominami; Osifo; Van De Ven	(yellow card) 45+3' Kuruçay; (yellow card) 58' Maziz; (yellow card) 83' Akimoto
14 December 2024; 18:15; Den Dreef; Leuven	Oud-Heverlee Leuven	1–0	Charleroi	Leysen; Akimoto, Ricca, Kuruçay, Gil; Verstraete, Maziz (64' Schrijvers), Banzuzi; Mitrović, Ikwuemesi (87' Biron), N'Dri (90'+2' Ominami)	Prévot; Balikwisha; George; Monticelli; Osifo; Souanga	(yellow card) 63' Ikwuemesi; (yellow card) 90+7' Ricca
14 December 2024; 18:15; Den Dreef; Leuven	60' N'Dri (Verstraete)	1–0		Leysen; Akimoto, Ricca, Kuruçay, Gil; Verstraete, Maziz (64' Schrijvers), Banzuzi; Mitrović, Ikwuemesi (87' Biron), N'Dri (90'+2' Ominami)	Prévot; Balikwisha; George; Monticelli; Osifo; Souanga	(yellow card) 63' Ikwuemesi; (yellow card) 90+7' Ricca
22 December 2024; 19:15; Jan Breydel Stadium; Bruges	Cercle Brugge	1–0	Oud-Heverlee Leuven	Leysen; Akimoto, Ricca, Kuruçay, Gil (67' Osifo); Verstraete, Schrijvers, Banzuzi; Mitrović (90'+1' Maziz), Ikwuemesi, N'Dri (83' Balikwisha)	Prévot; George; Mendyl; Ominami; Opoku; Parmentier	(yellow card) 39' Ricca; (yellow card) 90+1' Akimoto
22 December 2024; 19:15; Jan Breydel Stadium; Bruges	90'+10' Olaigbe (pen.)	1–0		Leysen; Akimoto, Ricca, Kuruçay, Gil (67' Osifo); Verstraete, Schrijvers, Banzuzi; Mitrović (90'+1' Maziz), Ikwuemesi, N'Dri (83' Balikwisha)	Prévot; George; Mendyl; Ominami; Opoku; Parmentier	(yellow card) 39' Ricca; (yellow card) 90+1' Akimoto
27 December 2024; 18:30; Den Dreef; Leuven	Oud-Heverlee Leuven	2–0	Beerschot	Leysen; Mendyl (89' Osifo), Ominami, Kuruçay, Gil; Verstraete, Schrijvers, Banzuzi (19' Maziz); Mitrović, Ikwuemesi (89' Maertens), N'Dri (67' Balikwisha)	Prévot; George; Monticelli; Opoku; Parmentier	(yellow card) 45+1' N'Dri; (yellow card) 63' Verstraete
27 December 2024; 18:30; Den Dreef; Leuven	76' Ikwuemesi (Mendyl); 86' Ikwuemesi (without assist)	1–0; 2–0		Leysen; Mendyl (89' Osifo), Ominami, Kuruçay, Gil; Verstraete, Schrijvers, Banzuzi (19' Maziz); Mitrović, Ikwuemesi (89' Maertens), N'Dri (67' Balikwisha)	Prévot; George; Monticelli; Opoku; Parmentier	(yellow card) 45+1' N'Dri; (yellow card) 63' Verstraete
11 January 2025; 18:15; Cegeka Arena; Genk	Genk	2–0	Oud-Heverlee Leuven	Leysen; Ominami (65' Balikwisha), Ricca, Kuruçay; Akimoto (79' Mendyl), Schrijvers, George (65' Banzuzi), Vlietinck (79' Osifo); Maziz, Ikwuemesi, N'Dri (65' Mitrović)	Prévot; Heremans; Monticelli; Pletinckx	(yellow card) 30' Maziz; (yellow card) 40' Akimoto; (yellow card) 46' Kuruçay; (yellow card) 83' Leysen; (yellow card) 90+6' Osifo
11 January 2025; 18:15; Cegeka Arena; Genk	48' Steuckers (pen.); 84' Oh (pen.)	1–0; 2–0		Leysen; Ominami (65' Balikwisha), Ricca, Kuruçay; Akimoto (79' Mendyl), Schrijvers, George (65' Banzuzi), Vlietinck (79' Osifo); Maziz, Ikwuemesi, N'Dri (65' Mitrović)	Prévot; Heremans; Monticelli; Pletinckx	(yellow card) 30' Maziz; (yellow card) 40' Akimoto; (yellow card) 46' Kuruçay; (yellow card) 83' Leysen; (yellow card) 90+6' Osifo
19 January 2025; 16:00; Joseph Marien Stadium; Forest, Brussels	Union SG	1–0	Oud-Heverlee Leuven	Leysen; Ominami, Ricca, Kuruçay; Akimoto, Schrijvers, Banzuzi, Vlietinck (84' Osifo); Maziz (46' N'Dri), Zeefuik (56' Mitrović), Balikwisha (65' George)	Prévot; Azzouz; Monticelli; Pletinckx	(yellow card) 13' Leysen; (yellow card) 73' Kuruçay; (red card) 81' Kuruçay; (yellow card) 88' Banzuzi; (yellow card) 90' Schrijvers
19 January 2025; 16:00; Joseph Marien Stadium; Forest, Brussels	14' David (pen.)	1–0		Leysen; Ominami, Ricca, Kuruçay; Akimoto, Schrijvers, Banzuzi, Vlietinck (84' Osifo); Maziz (46' N'Dri), Zeefuik (56' Mitrović), Balikwisha (65' George)	Prévot; Azzouz; Monticelli; Pletinckx	(yellow card) 13' Leysen; (yellow card) 73' Kuruçay; (red card) 81' Kuruçay; (yellow card) 88' Banzuzi; (yellow card) 90' Schrijvers
26 January 2025; 19:15; Den Dreef; Leuven	Oud-Heverlee Leuven	0–0	Gent	Leysen; Akimoto, Ricca, Ominami, Vlietinck; Schrijvers (69' Verstraete), Maziz (77' George), Banzuzi; Mitrović, Zeefuik (69' Ikwuemesi), N'Dri (77' Balikwisha)	Jochmans; Prévot; Monticelli; Osifo; Pletinckx	(yellow card) 38' Mitrović; (yellow card) 78' Ricca
31 January 2025; 20:45; Den Dreef; Leuven	Oud-Heverlee Leuven	1–0	Mechelen	Leysen; Akimoto, Ricca, Ominami, Vlietinck (81' Osifo); Verstraete, Schrijvers, Banzuzi; Mitrović (77' Maziz), Zeefuik (65' Pletinckx), N'Dri (65' George)	Jochmans; Prévot; Balikwisha; Monticelli; Nyakossi	(yellow card) 36' Verstraete; (yellow card) 1' (yellow-red card) 44' Banzuzi; (yellow card) 90+4' Leysen
31 January 2025; 20:45; Den Dreef; Leuven	6' Mitrović (N'Dri)	1–0		Leysen; Akimoto, Ricca, Ominami, Vlietinck (81' Osifo); Verstraete, Schrijvers, Banzuzi; Mitrović (77' Maziz), Zeefuik (65' Pletinckx), N'Dri (65' George)	Jochmans; Prévot; Balikwisha; Monticelli; Nyakossi	(yellow card) 36' Verstraete; (yellow card) 1' (yellow-red card) 44' Banzuzi; (yellow card) 90+4' Leysen
8 February 2025; 16:00; Jan Breydel Stadium; Bruges	Club Brugge	1–0	Oud-Heverlee Leuven	Prévot; Akimoto, Ominami (82' Maziz), Ricca, Pletinckx, Vlietinck; Verlinden, Verstraete, Schrijvers (82' George), Mitrović (64' Balikwisha); Zeefuik (64' Ikwuemesi)	Jochmans; Gil; Nyakossi; Osifo; Souanga	(yellow card) 7' Ominami; (yellow card) 19' Ricca; (red card) 53' Verlinden
8 February 2025; 16:00; Jan Breydel Stadium; Bruges	31' Nilsson (De Cuyper)	1–0		Prévot; Akimoto, Ominami (82' Maziz), Ricca, Pletinckx, Vlietinck; Verlinden, Verstraete, Schrijvers (82' George), Mitrović (64' Balikwisha); Zeefuik (64' Ikwuemesi)	Jochmans; Gil; Nyakossi; Osifo; Souanga	(yellow card) 7' Ominami; (yellow card) 19' Ricca; (red card) 53' Verlinden
15 February 2025; 16:00; Den Dreef; Leuven	Oud-Heverlee Leuven	3–2	Dender EH	Leysen; Akimoto (46' Ōhata), Ricca, Kuruçay (81' Maziz), Vlietinck; Verstraete, Schrijvers, Banzuzi (66' Mijatović); Balikwisha (46' Zeefuik), Ikwuemesi, Mitrović (46' Pletinckx)	Prévot; George; Ominami; Osifo	(yellow card) 90' Zeefuik; (yellow card) 90+8' Schrijvers
15 February 2025; 16:00; Den Dreef; Leuven	31' Kuruçay (Schrijvers) 89' Schrijvers (pen.); 90'+2' Mijatović (without assist)	0–1; 1–1; 1–2; 2–2; 3–2	9' Berte (Pupe) 39' Hrnčár (Ferraro)	Leysen; Akimoto (46' Ōhata), Ricca, Kuruçay (81' Maziz), Vlietinck; Verstraete, Schrijvers, Banzuzi (66' Mijatović); Balikwisha (46' Zeefuik), Ikwuemesi, Mitrović (46' Pletinckx)	Prévot; George; Ominami; Osifo	(yellow card) 90' Zeefuik; (yellow card) 90+8' Schrijvers
22 February 2025; 20:45; Bosuilstadion; Antwerp	Antwerp	2–2	Oud-Heverlee Leuven	Leysen; Ricca, Pletinckx (86' Maziz), Kuruçay; Osifo (86' Gil), Verstraete (86' Balikwisha), Verlinden (71' George), Banzuzi, Vlietinck; Zeefuik (71' Mijatović), Ikwuemesi	Prévot; Mitrović; Nyakossi; Ōhata	(yellow card) 16' Ikwuemesi; (yellow card) 22' Verstraete; (yellow card) 90+3' Mijatović
22 February 2025; 20:45; Bosuilstadion; Antwerp	47' Odoi (Kerk) 58' Janssen (Praet)	1–0; 1–1; 2–1; 2–2	56' Pletinckx (Verlinden) 90+6' Banzuzi (without assist)	Leysen; Ricca, Pletinckx (86' Maziz), Kuruçay; Osifo (86' Gil), Verstraete (86' Balikwisha), Verlinden (71' George), Banzuzi, Vlietinck; Zeefuik (71' Mijatović), Ikwuemesi	Prévot; Mitrović; Nyakossi; Ōhata	(yellow card) 16' Ikwuemesi; (yellow card) 22' Verstraete; (yellow card) 90+3' Mijatović
2 March 2025; 19:15; Den Dreef; Leuven	Oud-Heverlee Leuven	0–0	Westerlo	Leysen; Ricca, Pletinckx, Kuruçay; Osifo (79' Ōhata), Verstraete, Banzuzi, Schrijvers (86' Maziz), Gil; Ikwuemesi (86' Zeefuik), Verlinden (64' Mijatović)	Prévot; Balikwisha; Mitrović; Nyakossi; Souanga	(yellow card) 45' Ricca; (yellow card) 60' Verlinden
8 March 2025; 16:00; Guldensporen Stadion; Kortrijk	Kortrijk	2–0	Oud-Heverlee Leuven	Leysen; Gil, Ominami (61' Mitrović), Ricca, Pletinckx, Vlietinck; Banzuzi (61' Ikwuemesi), Schrijvers (67' Maziz), Verstraete; Verlinden (78' Balikwisha), Mijatović (61' Zeefuik)	Prévot; Nyakossi; Ōhata; Osifo	(yellow card) 35' Gil; (yellow card) 39' Vlietinck; (yellow card) 80' Verstraete; (yellow card) 84' Pletinckx; (red card) 90+3' Balikwisha
8 March 2025; 16:00; Guldensporen Stadion; Kortrijk	47' Ambrose (De Neve); 58' Ambrose (Karim)	1–0; 2–0		Leysen; Gil, Ominami (61' Mitrović), Ricca, Pletinckx, Vlietinck; Banzuzi (61' Ikwuemesi), Schrijvers (67' Maziz), Verstraete; Verlinden (78' Balikwisha), Mijatović (61' Zeefuik)	Prévot; Nyakossi; Ōhata; Osifo	(yellow card) 35' Gil; (yellow card) 39' Vlietinck; (yellow card) 80' Verstraete; (yellow card) 84' Pletinckx; (red card) 90+3' Balikwisha
16 March 2025; 18:30; Den Dreef; Leuven	Oud-Heverlee Leuven	3–2	Sint-Truiden	Leysen; Osifo (68' Vlietinck), Ricca, Kuruçay, Gil; Schrijvers (90'+4' Maziz), Verstraete, Banzuzi; Verlinden (90' Mijatović), Zeefuik (68' Ikwuemesi), Mitrović (90'+4' George)	Jochmans; Ōhata; Ominami; Pletinckx	(yellow card) 9' Osifo; (yellow card) 20' Zeefuik; (yellow card) 86' Gil
16 March 2025; 18:30; Den Dreef; Leuven	13' Schrijvers (without assist) 66' Gil (Schrijvers) 83' Schrijvers (pen.)	1–0; 1–1; 2–1; 2–2; 3–2	44' Bertaccini (Vanwesemael) 74' Bertaccini (Fujita)	Leysen; Osifo (68' Vlietinck), Ricca, Kuruçay, Gil; Schrijvers (90'+4' Maziz), Verstraete, Banzuzi; Verlinden (90' Mijatović), Zeefuik (68' Ikwuemesi), Mitrović (90'+4' George)	Jochmans; Ōhata; Ominami; Pletinckx	(yellow card) 9' Osifo; (yellow card) 20' Zeefuik; (yellow card) 86' Gil

==== Europe Play-offs ====
Pos	Team	Pld	W	D	L	GF	GA	GD	Pts	CHA	WES	MEC	DEN	STA	OHL
3	Mechelen	10	2	6	2	17	17	0	31	1–1	2–3		5–2	0–0	1–1
4	Dender EH	10	3	4	3	20	21	−1	29	2–1	1–0	2–2		1–1	5–0
5	Standard Liège	10	0	7	3	5	8	−3	27	0–1	1–1	2–2	0–0		0–1
6	OH Leuven	10	1	5	4	11	19	−8	27	0–0	0–2	1–2	4–4	1–1	

Source: Jupiler Pro League (in Dutch), Soccerway
Legend: Blue = home team win; Yellow = draw; Red = away team win.
Rules for classification: 1) Points; 2) Points without (possible) half points added due to rounding; 3) Regular season finishing position.

===== Results summary =====
Overall								Home						Away					
Pld	W	D	L	GF	GA	GD	Pts	W	D	L	GF	GA	GD	W	D	L	GF	GA	GD
10	1	5	4	11	19	−8	8	0	3	2	6	9	−3	1	2	2	5	10	−5

Source: Jupiler Pro League Ranking

===== Results by round =====
Round	1	2	3	4	5	6	7	8	9	10
Ground	H	A	A	H	A	H	H	A	H	A
Result	D	D	D	D	W	D	L	L	L	L
Position	4	4	4	4	2	2	4	5	5	6

Updated to match(es) played on 24 May 2025. Source: Jupiler Pro League
A = Away; H = Home; W = Win; D = Draw; L = Loss; = European competition play-off

===== Matches =====
The play-off fixtures were unveiled on 17 March 2025.

Europe Play-offs
Match Details	Home team	Result	Away team	Lineup	Unused Subs	Bookings
28 March 2025; 20:45; Den Dreef; Leuven	Oud-Heverlee Leuven	0–0	Charleroi	Leysen; Osifo, Ricca (46' Ominami), Pletinckx, Gil; Banzuzi, Verstraete (53' George), Schrijvers; Verlinden (50' Maziz), Ikwuemesi (80' Zeefuik), Mitrović (46' Mijatović)	Gijsbers; Jochmans; Nyakossi; Ōhata	(yellow card) 41' Ikwuemesi; (yellow card) 46' (yellow-red card) 58' Mijatović; (yellow card) 70' Gil
5 April 2025; 18:15; Het Kuipje; Westerlo	Westerlo	2–2	Oud-Heverlee Leuven	Leysen; Osifo, Pletinckx (46' Ricca), Nyakossi (76' Ominami), Vlietinck (76' Gil); Schrijvers, Verstraete, George; Maziz (83' Balikwisha); Zeefuik (71' Mitrović), Ikwuemesi	Jochmans; Azzouz; Ōhata	(yellow card) 82' Gil; (yellow card) 90+7' Leysen
5 April 2025; 18:15; Het Kuipje; Westerlo	62' Yow (Sayyadmanesh); 75' Devine (Rommens)	0–1; 0–2; 1–2; 2–2	53' Bayram (o.g.); 58' Nyakossi (without assist)	Leysen; Osifo, Pletinckx (46' Ricca), Nyakossi (76' Ominami), Vlietinck (76' Gil); Schrijvers, Verstraete, George; Maziz (83' Balikwisha); Zeefuik (71' Mitrović), Ikwuemesi	Jochmans; Azzouz; Ōhata	(yellow card) 82' Gil; (yellow card) 90+7' Leysen
13 April 2025; 16:00; Achter de Kazerne; Mechelen	Mechelen	1–1	Oud-Heverlee Leuven	Leysen; Ōhata (62' Osifo), Nyakossi (82' Ricca), Ominami, Gil; Schrijvers, Verstraete, George (73' Banzuzi); Maziz (62' Balikwisha); Ikwuemesi, Mitrović (82' Vlietinck)	Prévot; Kuruçay; Pletinckx; Verlinden	
13 April 2025; 16:00; Achter de Kazerne; Mechelen	17' Lauberbach (Marsà)	1–0; 1–1	20' Schrijvers (Ōhata)	Leysen; Ōhata (62' Osifo), Nyakossi (82' Ricca), Ominami, Gil; Schrijvers, Verstraete, George (73' Banzuzi); Maziz (62' Balikwisha); Ikwuemesi, Mitrović (82' Vlietinck)	Prévot; Kuruçay; Pletinckx; Verlinden	
19 April 2025; 16:00; Den Dreef; Leuven	Oud-Heverlee Leuven	4–4	Dender EH	Leysen; Osifo (85' Nyakossi), Ricca, Kuruçay (46' Pletinckx), Gil (62' Vlietinck); Schrijvers, Verstraete, George; Balikwisha (68' Verlinden); Ikwuemesi, Mitrović (68' Zeefuik)	Prévot; Banzuzi; Maziz; Ōhata	(yellow card) 79' Osifo
19 April 2025; 16:00; Den Dreef; Leuven	22' Ikwuemesi (Schrijvers); 33' Balikwisha (Ikwuemesi); 39' Schrijvers (Gil) 82' Ikwuemesi (Verlinden)	0–1; 1–1; 2–1; 3–1; 3–2; 3–3; 4–3; 4–4	3' Berte (without assist) 57' Hrnčár (without assist); 74' Scheidler (Hrnčár) 90'+2' Scheidler (without assist)	Leysen; Osifo (85' Nyakossi), Ricca, Kuruçay (46' Pletinckx), Gil (62' Vlietinck); Schrijvers, Verstraete, George; Balikwisha (68' Verlinden); Ikwuemesi, Mitrović (68' Zeefuik)	Prévot; Banzuzi; Maziz; Ōhata	(yellow card) 79' Osifo
22 April 2025; 20:30; Stade Maurice Dufrasne; Liège	Standard Liège	0–1	Oud-Heverlee Leuven	Leysen; Osifo (63' Ōhata), Pletinckx, Kuruçay, Vlietinck; Banzuzi, Verstraete (25' George), Schrijvers; Maziz (82' Balikwisha); Zeefuik (63' Verlinden), Ikwuemesi	Prévot; Mitrović; Nyakossi; Ominami; Ricca	(yellow card) 47' Maziz; (yellow card) 50' George; (yellow card) 86' Ōhata
22 April 2025; 20:30; Stade Maurice Dufrasne; Liège		0–1	78' Verlinden (Maziz)	Leysen; Osifo (63' Ōhata), Pletinckx, Kuruçay, Vlietinck; Banzuzi, Verstraete (25' George), Schrijvers; Maziz (82' Balikwisha); Zeefuik (63' Verlinden), Ikwuemesi	Prévot; Mitrović; Nyakossi; Ominami; Ricca	(yellow card) 47' Maziz; (yellow card) 50' George; (yellow card) 86' Ōhata
26 April 2025; 16:00; Den Dreef; Leuven	Oud-Heverlee Leuven	1–1	Standard Liège	Leysen; Ōhata (66' Osifo), Pletinckx, Kuruçay, Gil; Banzuzi (66' George), Verstraete, Schrijvers; Maziz (66' Balikwisha); Ikwuemesi (74' Zeefuik), Verlinden (74' Mitrović)	Prévot; Nyakossi; Ominami; Vlietinck	(yellow card) 62' Banzuzi; (yellow card) 90' George
26 April 2025; 16:00; Den Dreef; Leuven	38' Schrijvers (pen.)	1–0; 1–1	81' Hountondji (without assist)	Leysen; Ōhata (66' Osifo), Pletinckx, Kuruçay, Gil; Banzuzi (66' George), Verstraete, Schrijvers; Maziz (66' Balikwisha); Ikwuemesi (74' Zeefuik), Verlinden (74' Mitrović)	Prévot; Nyakossi; Ominami; Vlietinck	(yellow card) 62' Banzuzi; (yellow card) 90' George
3 May 2025; 18:15; Den Dreef; Leuven	Oud-Heverlee Leuven	1–2	Mechelen	Leysen; Osifo (57' Kuruçay), Ricca, Nyakossi (79' Pletinckx), Vlietinck; Schrijvers, Verstraete, Banzuzi (70' George); Maziz (57' Zeefuik); Ikwuemesi, Verlinden (70' Balikwisha)	Prévot; Gil; Mitrović; Ominami	(yellow card) 22' Verstraete; (yellow card) 38' Schrijvers; (yellow card) 55' Banzuzi; (yellow card) 90+1' Balikwisha; (yellow card) 90+3' Leysen
3 May 2025; 18:15; Den Dreef; Leuven	89' Pletinckx (Ikwuemesi)	0–1; 0–2; 1–2	45'+1' Schoofs (pen.); 81' Storm (Raman)	Leysen; Osifo (57' Kuruçay), Ricca, Nyakossi (79' Pletinckx), Vlietinck; Schrijvers, Verstraete, Banzuzi (70' George); Maziz (57' Zeefuik); Ikwuemesi, Verlinden (70' Balikwisha)	Prévot; Gil; Mitrović; Ominami	(yellow card) 22' Verstraete; (yellow card) 38' Schrijvers; (yellow card) 55' Banzuzi; (yellow card) 90+1' Balikwisha; (yellow card) 90+3' Leysen
11 May 2025; 19:15; Van Roystadion; Denderleeuw	Dender EH	5–0	Oud-Heverlee Leuven	Leysen; Osifo, Pletinckx, Ominami, Gil; Schrijvers, Verstraete, George (62' Mijatović); Balikwisha (62' Kuruçay); Zeefuik (46' Ikwuemesi), Mitrović (46' Verlinden)	Prévot; Banzuzi; Maziz; Nyakossi; Souanga	(yellow card) 45+3' Verstraete; (yellow card) 87' Osifo
11 May 2025; 19:15; Van Roystadion; Denderleeuw	6' Hrnčár (Nsimba); 18' Goncalves (without assist); 22' Nsimba (Rodes); 28' Rodes (Goncalves); 90' Berte (Nsimba)	1–0; 2–0; 3–0; 4–0; 5–0		Leysen; Osifo, Pletinckx, Ominami, Gil; Schrijvers, Verstraete, George (62' Mijatović); Balikwisha (62' Kuruçay); Zeefuik (46' Ikwuemesi), Mitrović (46' Verlinden)	Prévot; Banzuzi; Maziz; Nyakossi; Souanga	(yellow card) 45+3' Verstraete; (yellow card) 87' Osifo
16 May 2025; 20:45; Den Dreef; Leuven	Oud-Heverlee Leuven	0–2	Westerlo	Leysen (70' Jochmans); Ricca, Pletinckx (62' Souanga), Nyakossi (87' Monticelli), Vlietinck; Banzuzi (70' Maertens), Verstraete, Schrijvers; Verlinden, Ikwuemesi (70' Diallo), Balikwisha	Azzouz; George; Maziz; Opoku	(yellow card) 39' Verlinden; (yellow card) 80' Souanga; (yellow card) 90+2' Verstraete
16 May 2025; 20:45; Den Dreef; Leuven		0–1; 0–2	28' Van den Keybus (Piedfort); 82' Devine (without assist)	Leysen (70' Jochmans); Ricca, Pletinckx (62' Souanga), Nyakossi (87' Monticelli), Vlietinck; Banzuzi (70' Maertens), Verstraete, Schrijvers; Verlinden, Ikwuemesi (70' Diallo), Balikwisha	Azzouz; George; Maziz; Opoku	(yellow card) 39' Verlinden; (yellow card) 80' Souanga; (yellow card) 90+2' Verstraete
24 May 2025; 20:00; Stade du Pays de Charleroi; Charleroi	Charleroi	2–1	Oud-Heverlee Leuven	Prévot; Ricca (89' Souanga), Pletinckx, Ominami, Vlietinck (78' Osifo); George, Maziz (72' Maertens), Schrijvers; Verlinden, Ikwuemesi (78' Azzouz), Balikwisha (79' Opoku)	Leysen; Banzuzi; Diallo; Monticelli; Nyakossi	(yellow card) 75' Vlietinck
24 May 2025; 20:00; Stade du Pays de Charleroi; Charleroi	29' Keita (Camara) 88' Stanic (without assist)	1–0; 1–1; 2–1	43' Titraoui (o.g.)	Prévot; Ricca (89' Souanga), Pletinckx, Ominami, Vlietinck (78' Osifo); George, Maziz (72' Maertens), Schrijvers; Verlinden, Ikwuemesi (78' Azzouz), Balikwisha (79' Opoku)	Leysen; Banzuzi; Diallo; Monticelli; Nyakossi	(yellow card) 75' Vlietinck

=== Belgian Cup ===
==== Results ====
2024–25 Belgian Cup
Match Details	Home team	Result	Away team	Lineup	Unused Subs	Bookings
7th Round
30 October 2024; 20:00; Den Dreef; Leuven	Oud-Heverlee Leuven	2–0	Seraing	Leysen; Kuruçay, Ominami, Mendyl (65' N'Dri), Gil, Vlietinck (65' Ricca); Schrijvers, Maziz (65' George); Mitrović (80' Balikwisha), Biron, Mueanta (80' Banzuzi)	Jochmans; Ikwuemesi	
30 October 2024; 20:00; Den Dreef; Leuven	10' Schrijvers (pen.); 87' Balikwisha (without assist)	1–0; 2–0		Leysen; Kuruçay, Ominami, Mendyl (65' N'Dri), Gil, Vlietinck (65' Ricca); Schrijvers, Maziz (65' George); Mitrović (80' Balikwisha), Biron, Mueanta (80' Banzuzi)	Jochmans; Ikwuemesi	
8th Round
4 December 2024; 20:00; Den Dreef; Leuven	Oud-Heverlee Leuven	5–0	Zulte Waregem	Leysen; Akimoto (62' Mendyl), Ominami, Kuruçay (75' Souanga), Gil; Verstraete, Maziz (62' George), Banzuzi; Balikwisha, Ikwuemesi (62' Mitrović), N'Dri (86' Van De Ven)	Prévot; Osifo; Ricca; Schrijvers	(yellow card) 72' Mendyl
4 December 2024; 20:00; Den Dreef; Leuven	15' Kuruçay (Maziz); 35' Maziz (Akimoto); 39' Banzuzi (Gil); 53' N'Dri (Maziz); 60' Ikwuemesi (Gil)	1–0; 2–0; 3–0; 4–0; 5–0		Leysen; Akimoto (62' Mendyl), Ominami, Kuruçay (75' Souanga), Gil; Verstraete, Maziz (62' George), Banzuzi; Balikwisha, Ikwuemesi (62' Mitrović), N'Dri (86' Van De Ven)	Prévot; Osifo; Ricca; Schrijvers	(yellow card) 72' Mendyl
Quarter-Finals
7 January 2025; 20:45; Jan Breydel Stadium; Bruges	Club Brugge	3–0	Oud-Heverlee Leuven	Leysen; Akimoto, Ominami, Kuruçay, Osifo (67' Maertens); George (62' Vlietinck), Maziz (86' Ricca), Schrijvers; Mitrović (62' Balikwisha), Ikwuemesi, N'Dri	Prévot; Azzouz; Monticelli; Opoku; Pletinckx	(yellow card) 42' Mitrović; (yellow card) 85' Kuruçay
7 January 2025; 20:45; Jan Breydel Stadium; Bruges	23' Tzolis (Jashari); 69' Tzolis (Skov Olsen); 86' Skóraś (pen.)	1–0; 2–0; 3–0		Leysen; Akimoto, Ominami, Kuruçay, Osifo (67' Maertens); George (62' Vlietinck), Maziz (86' Ricca), Schrijvers; Mitrović (62' Balikwisha), Ikwuemesi, N'Dri	Prévot; Azzouz; Monticelli; Opoku; Pletinckx	(yellow card) 42' Mitrović; (yellow card) 85' Kuruçay

== Squad statistics ==
Includes only competitive matches.

=== Appearances ===
Players with no appearances are not included in the list.

No.	Pos.	Nat.	Name	Belgian Pro League Regular season			Belgian Pro League Playoffs			Belgian Cup			Total		
No.	Pos.	Nat.	Name	Starts	Sub	Unused Sub	Starts	Sub	Unused Sub	Starts	Sub	Unused Sub	Starts	Sub	Unused Sub
1	GK	(Belgium)	Tobe Leysen	29	0	0	9	0	1	3	0	0	41	0	1
3	DF	(Belgium)	Antef Tsoungui	0	2	2	0	0	0	0	0	0	0	2	2
4	MF	(Belgium)	Birger Verstraete	24	2	0	9	0	0	1	0	0	34	2	0
5	DF	(Japan)	Takuma Ominami	14	5	4	3	2	3	3	0	0	20	7	7
6	MF	(Netherlands)	Ezechiel Banzuzi	23	5	0	5	1	3	1	1	0	29	7	3
7	MF	(Belgium)	Thibaud Verlinden	5	0	0	5	3	1	0	0	0	10	3	1
8	MF	(Belgium)	Siebe Schrijvers	22	6	0	10	0	0	2	0	1	34	6	1
9	FW	(Netherlands)	Lequincio Zeefuik	6	3	0	3	4	0	0	0	0	9	7	0
10	MF	(France)	Youssef Maziz	17	13	0	6	1	3	3	0	0	26	14	3
14	DF	(Uruguay)	Federico Ricca	22	1	0	5	2	1	1	1	1	28	4	2
16	GK	(France)	Maxence Prévot	1	0	14	1	0	6	0	0	2	2	0	22
19	FW	(Nigeria)	Chukwubuikem Ikwuemesi	15	12	0	9	1	0	2	0	1	26	13	1
21	MF	(Democratic Republic of the Congo)	William Balikwisha	12	13	4	4	5	0	1	2	0	17	20	4
22	FW	(Serbia)	Jovan Mijatović	1	4	0	0	2	0	0	0	0	1	6	0
23	FW	(Serbia)	Stefan Mitrović	15	5	3	4	2	2	2	1	0	21	8	5
25	MF	(Belgium)	Manuel Osifo	8	6	12	6	3	0	1	0	1	15	9	13
27	DF	(Spain)	Óscar Gil	12	5	6	5	1	1	2	0	0	19	6	7
28	DF	(Belgium)	Ewoud Pletinckx	9	2	4	7	2	1	0	0	1	16	4	6
30	MF	(Japan)	Takahiro Akimoto	23	2	0	0	0	0	2	0	0	25	2	0
33	MF	(Belgium)	Mathieu Maertens	11	1	0	0	2	0	0	1	0	11	4	0
34	DF	(Switzerland)	Roggerio Nyakossi	0	0	5	4	1	5	0	0	0	4	1	10
40	DF	(Belgium)	Roméo Monticelli	0	0	6	0	1	1	0	0	1	0	1	8
55	MF	(Belgium)	Wouter George	1	7	9	5	4	1	1	2	0	7	13	10
56	MF	(Belgium)	Mathéo Parmentier	0	0	2	0	0	0	0	0	0	0	0	2
58	DF	(Turkey)	Hasan Kuruçay	17	1	2	3	2	1	3	0	0	23	3	3
60	MF	(Morocco)	Mohamed Yassine Azzouz	0	0	1	0	1	2	0	0	1	0	1	4
61	GK	(Belgium)	Owen Jochmans	0	0	19	0	1	2	0	0	1	0	1	22
63	DF	(Belgium)	Christ Souanga	0	0	9	0	2	1	0	1	0	0	3	10
66	DF	(Japan)	Ayumu Ōhata	0	2	3	2	1	3	0	0	0	2	3	6
67	MF	(Belgium)	Amadou Diallo	0	0	0	0	1	1	0	0	0	0	1	1
77	MF	(Belgium)	Thibault Vlietinck	15	8	2	5	2	1	1	1	0	21	11	3
80	MF	(Belgium)	Matteo Heremans	0	0	1	0	0	0	0	0	0	0	0	1
81	GK	(Belgium)	Lander Gijsbers	0	0	0	0	0	1	0	0	0	0	0	1
93	DF	(Belgium)	Milan Gigot	0	0	1	0	0	0	0	0	0	0	0	1
89	FW	(Belgium)	Chike Van De Ven	0	0	1	0	0	0	0	1	0	0	1	1
95	GK	(Belgium)	Théo Radelet	0	0	1	0	0	0	0	0	0	0	0	1
99	DF	(Belgium)	Davis Opoku	0	1	3	0	1	1	0	0	1	0	2	5
Players that have appeared this season, who are out on loan or have left OH Leuven
7	MF	(Iceland)	Jón Dagur Þorsteinsson (sold to Hertha Berlin)	0	3	1	0	0	0	0	0	0	0	3	1
11	FW	(Belgium)	Nachon Nsingi (first on loan to Dunkerque, then on loan to Marítimo)	0	0	3	0	0	0	0	0	0	0	0	3
15	MF	(Ivory Coast)	Konan N'Dri (sold to Lecce)	17	7	0	0	0	0	2	1	0	19	8	0
17	MF	(Thailand)	Suphanat Mueanta (loan return to Buriram United)	1	1	7	0	0	0	1	0	0	2	1	7
20	MF	(Morocco)	Hamza Mendyl (sold to Aris Thessaloniki)	6	6	7	0	0	0	1	1	0	7	7	7
22	FW	(Martinique)	Mickaël Biron (loan return to RWD Molenbeek)	0	11	3	0	0	0	1	0	0	1	11	3
23	DF	(Belgium)	Joël Schingtienne (sold to Venezia)	4	0	0	0	0	0	0	0	0	4	0	0

=== Goalscorers ===
Rank	Pos.	No.	Player	Belgian Pro League Regular season	Belgian Pro League Playoffs	Belgian Cup	Total
1	MF	8	(Belgium) Siebe Schrijvers	4	3	1	8
2	FW	19	(Nigeria) Chukwubuikem Ikwuemesi	4	2	1	7
3	MF	10	(France) Youssef Maziz	3	0	1	4
3	FW	15	(Ivory Coast) Konan N'Dri	3	0	1	4
5	MF	6	(Netherlands) Ezechiel Banzuzi	2	0	1	3
5	MF	21	(Democratic Republic of the Congo) William Balikwisha	1	1	1	3
7	FW	23	(Serbia) Stefan Mitrović	2	0	0	2
7	DF	28	(Belgium) Ewoud Pletinckx	1	1	0	2
7	DF	58	(Turkey) Hasan Kuruçay	1	0	1	2
10	DF	5	(Japan) Takuma Ominami	1	0	0	1
10	MF	7	(Iceland) Jón Dagur Þorsteinsson	1	0	0	1
10	MF	7	(Belgium) Thibaud Verlinden	0	1	0	1
10	DF	14	(Uruguay) Federico Ricca	1	0	0	1
10	FW	22	(Serbia) Jovan Mijatović	1	0	0	1
10	DF	27	(Spain) Óscar Gil	1	0	0	1
10	MF	33	(Belgium) Mathieu Maertens	1	0	0	1
10	DF	34	(Switzerland) Roggerio Nyakossi	0	1	0	1
10	MF	77	(Belgium) Thibault Vlietinck	1	0	0	1
Own Goals				0	2	0	2
Total				28	11	7	46

=== Assists ===
Rank	Pos.	No.	Player	Belgian Pro League Regular season	Belgian Pro League Playoffs	Belgian Cup	Total
1	MF	6	(Netherlands) Ezechiel Banzuzi	5	0	0	5
2	MF	8	(Belgium) Siebe Schrijvers	3	1	0	4
2	MF	10	(France) Youssef Maziz	1	1	2	4
4	MF	4	(Belgium) Birger Verstraete	3	0	0	3
4	DF	27	(Spain) Óscar Gil	1	1	1	3
6	MF	7	(Belgium) Thibaud Verlinden	1	1	0	2
6	MF	15	(Ivory Coast) Konan N'Dri	2	0	0	2
6	FW	19	(Nigeria) Chukwubuikem Ikwuemesi	0	2	0	2
9	MF	20	(Morocco) Hamza Mendyl	1	0	0	1
9	MF	21	(Democratic Republic of the Congo) William Balikwisha	1	0	0	1
9	FW	23	(Serbia) Stefan Mitrović	1	0	0	1
9	MF	25	(Belgium) Manuel Osifo	1	0	0	1
9	DF	28	(Belgium) Ewoud Pletinckx	1	0	0	1
9	DF	30	(Japan) Takahiro Akimoto	0	0	1	1
9	MF	33	(Belgium) Mathieu Maertens	1	0	0	1
9	DF	66	(Japan) Ayumu Ōhata	0	1	0	1
Total Goals With Assists				21	7	5	33
No Assist
Penalties				3	1	1	5
Own Goals				0	2	0	2
Without Assist				4	1	1	6
Total Goals Without Assist				7	4	2	13

=== Clean sheets ===
No.	Player	Belgian Pro League Regular season	Belgian Pro League Playoffs	Belgian Cup	Total clean sheets	% Clean sheet games	Goals conceded	Avg minutes between conceding
1	(Belgium) Tobe Leysen	9	2	2	13	31.88 %	52	70.58
16	(France) Maxence Prévot	0	0	0	0	0 %	3	60
61	(Belgium) Owen Jochmans	0	0	0	0	0 %	1	20
81	(Belgium) Lander Gijsbers	0	0	0	0	NA	0	NA
95	(Belgium) Théo Radelet	0	0	0	0	NA	0	NA
