= List of US Salernitana 1919 players =

Below is a list of notable footballers who have played for US Salernitana 1919. Generally, this means players that have played 100 or more league matches for the club. However, some players who have played fewer matches are also included; this includes players that have had considerable success at other clubs, and players who have appeared at least once in the FIFA World Cup.

Name	Nationality	Position	Salernitana career	Appearances	Goals
Attila Sallustro	Italy	FW	1937-1939	14	1
Lino Cason	Italy	MF	1942-1943	0	0
Alberto Piccinini	Italy	MF	1945-1948	43	0
Cesare Benedetti	Italy	DF	1946-1948	56	0
Manlio Scopigno	Italy	DF	1948-1951	87	8
Bülent Eken	Turkey	DF	1950-1951	21	1
Tristano Pangaro	Italy	DF	1950-1951	31	0
Mihály Kincses	Hungary	MF	1952-1954	32	8
Italo Acconcia	Italy	MF	1955-1956	20	1
Franco Cordova	Italy	MF	1962–1963	6	1
Fabio Enzo	Italy	FW	1964	6	0
Pierino Prati	Italy	FW	1965–1966	19	10
Vito Chimenti	Italy	FW	1974-1975	29	3
Alessandro Abbondanza	Italy	FW	1975-1977	67	7
Francesco Buglio	Italy	FW	1976-1977	6	0
Vincenzo Zazzaro	Italy	MF	1976-1980	99	2
Lucio Mujesan	Italy	FW	1976-1978	50	19
Walter Zenga	Italy	GK	1978–1979	3	0
Paolo Dall'Oro	Italy	DF	1980-1981	32	0
Luigi De Canio	Italy	DF	1981	3	0
Michele De Nadai	Italy	DF/MF	1984-1986	51	0
Massimo Pedrazzini	Italy	MF	1985-1987	57	3
Antonio De Vitis	Italy	FW	1985-1986	25	16
Roberto Rizzo	Italy	MF	1986-1987	31	1
Salvatore Campilongo	Italy	FW	1987-1988	32	4
Gabriele Morganti	Italy	DF	1987-1988	33	0
Agostino Di Bartolomei	Italy	MF	1988–1990	52	16
Gianluca Grassadonia	Italy	DF	1988-1989 1991-1992 1993-1996 2006-2007	10	0
Mark Iuliano	Italy	DF	1990–1996	83	1
Gian Piero Gasperini	Italy	MF	1990-1991	35	1
Andrea Guerra	Italy	DF	1992-1993	28	0
Antonio Chimenti	Italy	GK	1993–1997	137	0
Roberto Breda	Italy	MF	1993–1999; 2003–2005	230	10
Salvatore Fresi	Italy	DF	1993–1995; 1998–1999; 2005–2006	97	5
Stefano Bettarini	Italy	DF	1994-1995	5	0
Donald Agu	Nigeria	DF	1995-1996	0	0
Marco Ferrante	Italy	FW	1995-1996	30	6
Alessandro Del Grosso	Italy	DF	1996–1999; 2001–2002	105	2
Edoardo Artistico	Italy	FW	1996-1998	53	18
Francesco Dell'Anno	Italy	MF	1996-1997	27	1
Stefan Jansen	Netherlands	FW	1996-1997	16	1
Phil Masinga	South Africa	FW	1997	16	4
Ciro Polito	Italy	GK	1997-1999 2009-2011	32	1
Marco Di Vaio	Italy	FW	1997–1999	67	34
Andrea Ivan	Italy	GK	1997-2000	15	0
Václav Koloušek	Czech Republic	MF	1997-1999 2003	6	0
Giacomo Tedesco	Italy	MF	1997-2002	133	13
Rigobert Song	Cameroon	DF	1998	4	1
Luca Fusco	Italy	DF	1998–2003; 2007–2010	132	2
David Di Michele	Italy	FW	1998–2001	92	40
Michele Fini	Italy	MF	1998-2000	10	0
Gennaro Gattuso	Italy	MF	1998–1999	25	0
Ighli Vannucchi	Italy	MF	1998-2000	73	13
Vincenzo Chianese	Italy	FW	1998-2001	35	1
Dražen Bolić	Serbia	DF	1998-2001	85	3
Roberto Cardinale	Italy	DF	1998-2003 2006-2009	71	3
Francesco De Francesco	Italy	FW	1998	0	0
Aleksandar Kristić	Serbia	DF	1998-2000	2	1
Dragan Vukoja	Croatia	FW	1998	1	0
Lennart Bak	Denmark	MF	1998-1999	0	0
Franco Semioli	Italy	MF	1999–2000	24	0
Francesco Di Jorio	Switzerland	MF	1999-2001	32	2
Lorenzo Squizzi	Italy	GK	1999-2000	4	0
Marco Zoro	Ivory Coast	DF	1999–2002	55	1
Domenico Cristiano	Italy	MF	1999-2001	28	1
Jean-Pierre Cyprien	France	DF	2000	0	0
Eli Louhenapessy	Netherlands	DF/MF	2000-2001	5	0
Giuseppe Mascara	Italy	FW	2001	1	1
Alfonso Camorani	Italy	MF	2001-2004	66	2
Babù	Brazil	FW	2001-2003	27	3
Emiliano Bigica	Italy	MF	2001-2002	11	0
Edvard Lasota	Czech Republic	MF	2001	0	0
Cristian Molinaro	Italy	DF	2002–2005	77	1
Rafael Bondi	Brazil	MF	2002-2003	7	0
Fabio Mazzeo	Italy	FW	2002-2004	8	0
Agostino Garofalo	Italy	DF	2002-2004	5	0
Eddy Baggio	Italy	FW/MF	2002-2003	27	6
Raffaele Schiavi	Italy	DF	2002-2005 2015-2019	63	4
Ruslan Nigmatullin	Russia	GK	2003	14	0
Erjon Bogdani	Albania	FW	2003–2004	38	8
Alfonso De Lucia	Italy	GK	2003-2004	11	0
Stefano De Angelis	Italy	DF	2003-2005	40	0
Davide Bombardini	Italy	MF	2003-2005	59	4
Ricardo Verón	Argentina	MF	2003-2004	5	10
Václav Koloušek	Czech Republic	MF	2003	6	0
Alessandro Zoppetti	Italy	DF	2003	17	1
Valentino Lai	Sweden	MF	2003-2004	31	2
Pasquale Luiso	Italy	FW	2003	10	2
Leandro Guerreiro	Brazil	MF	2003-2004	14	0
Siyabonga Nomvethe	South Africa	FW	2004	17	2
Samuel Caballero	Honduras	DF	2004	0	0
Karl Corneliusson	Sweden	DF	2004-2005	22	2
Antonio Ghomsi	Cameroon	DF	2004-2005	12	0
Raffaele Palladino	Italy	FW	2004–2005	39	15
Massimo Borgobello	Italy	FW	2004	8	0
Jimmy Tamandi	Sweden	DF	2004	0	0
Alex Brunner	Italy	GK	2004-2005	11	0
Claudio Ferrarese	Italy	MF	2004-2005	35	4
Patrice Feussi	Cameroon	MF	2004-2005	2	0
Nassim Mendil	France	FW	2004-2005	17	2
Tiziano Polenghi	Italy	DF	2004-2005	18	2
Evans Soligo	Italy	MF	2005–2010	166	10
Martin Åslund	Sweden	MF	2005	12	1
Marco Ambrosio	Italy	GK	2005-2006	55	0
Emanuele Ferraro	Italy	FW	2005-2010	96	27
Raffaele Rubino	Italy	FW	2005	18	3
Luigi Panarelli	Italy	DF	2006-2007	0	0
Alberto Filippini	Italy	FW	2006-2007	3	0
Cristian Agnelli	Italy	MF	2006-2007	27	2
Dario Bergamelli	Italy	DF	2006-2007	2	0
Alessio Sestu	Italy	MF	2006-2007	30	8
Juan Arostegui	Argentina	FW	2007	9	0
Mauro Milanese	Italy	DF	2007-2008	28	0
Andrea Cesaro	Italy	MF	2007-2008	1	0
Rok Štraus	Slovenia	MF	2007	0	0
Roberto Merino	Peru	MF	2008-2011	47	5
Maurizio Peccarisi	Italy	DF	2008-2011	19	0
Fabrizio Cammarata	Italy	FW	2008	9	0
Carlos Barrionuevo	Argentina	FW	2008-2009	11	0
Rino Iuliano	Italy	GK	2008-2011	9	0
Manolo Pestrin	Italy	MF	2008-2011 2014-2016	64	1
Dino Fava	Italy	FW	2008-2009 2009-2011	49	10
Imperio Carcione	Italy	MF	2008	4	0
Domenico Giampà	Italy	MF	2008	11	0
Kingsley Umunegbu	Nigeria	FW	2008-2009	2	0
Georgios Kyriazis	Greece	DF	2008-2010	63	3
Carmine Coppola	Italy	MF	2009	9	0
Antimo Iunco	Italy	FW/MF	2009	16	3
Ivan Fatić	Montenegro	DF	2009	17	0
Filipe Machado	Brazil	DF	2009-2010	6	1
Danilo Soddimo	Italy	MF	2009-2010	8	0
Maurizio Ciaramitaro	Italy	MF	2009	17	2
Gennaro Fragiello	Italy	FW	2009	3	0
Francesco Millesi	Italy	MF	2009-2010	7	0
Luca Orlando	Italy	FW	2010-2011	8	2
Antonino Ragusa	Italy	MF	2010-2011	32	7
Adriano Montalto	Italy	FW	2010-2011	12	3
Jaroslav Šedivec	Czech Republic	FW	2010-2011	6	0
Fabinho	Brazil	FW	2010-2011	19	7
Domenico Franco	Italy	MF	2010-2011	9	0
Lóránd Szatmári	Romania	MF	2010-2011	24	1
Jefferson Oliveira	Brazil	DF	2011	19	1
Salvatore D'Alterio	Italy	DF	2011	14	0
Salvatore Aurelio	Italy	FW	2011	9	1
Raffaele Biancolino	Italy	FW	2011-2012	29	22
Antony Iannarilli	Italy	GK	2011-2014	47	0
Simone Calori	Italy	DF	2011-2012	31	0
David Mounard	France	MF	2011-2015	29	11
Christian Chirieletti	Italy	DF	2011-2014	40	0
Enrico Zampa	Italy	MF	2012-2014	22	0
Alessandro Tuia	Italy	DF	2012-2018	106	2
Riccardo Perpetuini	Italy	MF/DF	2012-2014	52	6
Ciro Ginestra	Italy	FW	2012-2015	27	17
Sani Emmanuel	Nigeria	FW	2012	1	0
Seyi Adeleke	Nigeria	DF/MF	2012-2013	8	1
Manuel Ricci	Italy	MF	2012-2014	25	0
Manuel Mancini	Italy	MF	2012-2014	43	4
David Giubilato	Italy	DF	2012-2013	0	0
Morris Molinari	Italy	DF	2012-2014	38	3
Luigi Silvestri	Italy	DF	2012-2013	3	0
Ettore Mendicino	Italy	FW	2013-2015	48	13
Luigi Grassi	Italy	FW	2013-2014	0	0
Pasquale Foggia	Italy	MF	2013-2014	22	1
Alessandro Volpe	Italy	MF	2013-2015	28	0
Gennaro Esposito	Italy	MF	2013-2014	7	0
Pier Graziano Gori	Italy	GK	2014-2015	51	0
Riccardo Colombo	Italy	DF	2014-2016	61	4
Zoran Švonja	Serbia	MF	2014	1	0
Francesco Favasuli	Italy	MF	2014-2015	35	3
Manuel Giandonato	Italy	MF	2014-2015	12	0
Mohamed Fofana	France	FW	2014	12	0
Andrea Nalini	Italy	FW	2014-2016	35	3
Ivan Castiglia	Italy	MF	2014-2015	4	0
Álvaro Ampuero	Peru	DF	2014	5	0
Massimo Coda	Italy	FW	2015-2017	80	31
Umberto Eusepi	Italy	FW	2015	10	0
Alfredo Donnarumma	Italy	FW/MF	2015-2017	59	18
Alessandro Bernardini	Italy	DF	2015-2019	74	1
Maikol Negro	Italy	MF	2015	30	10
Daniele Sciaudone	Italy	MF	2015-2016	16	0
Andrea Russotto	Italy	MF	2015	0	0
Moses Odjer	Ghana	MF	2015-2020	103	1
Gennaro Troianiello	Italy	MF	2015-2017	15	1
Raffaele Schiavi	Italy	DF	2015-2019	63	4
David Milinković	France	MF	2015	9	0
Francesco Della Rocca	Italy	MF	2016-2018	36	2
Valerio Mantovani	Italy	DF	2016-2023	75	0
Riccardo Improta	Italy	MF/FW	2016-2017	31	2
Alessandro Rosina	Italy	MF	2016-2020	75	11
Massimiliano Busellato	Italy	MF	2016-2017	25	2
Luigi Vitale	Italy	MF/DF	2016-2019	86	6
Chris Ikonomidis	Australia	MF	2016	14	1
Mamadou Tounkara	Spain	FW	2016-2017	1	0
Giuseppe Caccavallo	Italy	FW	2016-2017	10	0
Ricardo Bagadur	Croatia	DF	2016	10	2
Nunzio Di Roberto	Italy	MF	2017-2018	17	0
Alejandro Rodríguez	Spain	FW	2017-2018	14	4
Ștefan Popescu	Romania	DF	2017-2018	11	0
Boris Radunović	Serbia	GK	2017-2018	36	0
Patrick Asmah	Ghana	DF	2017	0	0
Riccardo Bocalon	Italy	FW	2017-2019	55	15
Marius Adamonis	Lithuania	GK	2017-2018 2020-2021	3	0
Luca Bittante	Italy	DF	2017	18	0
Franco Signorelli	Venezuela	MF	2017-2019	21	0
Antonio Palumbo	Italy	MF	2018-2019	5	0
Jean-Daniel Akpa Akpro	Ivory Coast	MF	2018-2020	58	2
Djavan Anderson	Netherlands	MF/DF	2018-2019	18	1
Guillaume Gigliotti	France	DF	2018-2019	25	0
Gianmarco Vannucchi	Italy	GK	2018-2020	4	0
Luca Castiglia	Italy	MF	2018-2022	16	1
Milan Đurić	Bosnia and Herzegovina	FW	2018-2022	127	28
Gioacchino Galeotafiore	Italy	DF	2018-2022	1	0
Francesco Di Tacchio	Italy	MF	2018-2022	119	6
Thomas Heurtaux	France	DF	2019-2020	6	0
Walter López	Uruguay	DF	2019-2021	51	0
Andreas Karo	Cyprus	DF	2019-2021	32	1
Hysen Memolla	Albania	DF	2019	3	0
Giuseppe Barone	United States	MF	2020-2021	0	0
Sanasi Sy	France	DF	2020-2023	1	0
Vid Belec	Slovenia	GK	2020-2022	57	0
Norbert Gyömbér	Slovakia	DF/MF	2020-	115	0
Frédéric Veseli	Albania	DF	2020-2022	32	1
Joel Baraye	Senegal	DF	2020-2021	1	0
Franck Ribéry	France	MF	2021-2023	24	0
Andrei Moțoc	Moldova	DF	2021-	1	0
Lassana Coulibaly	Mali	MF	2021-	94	4
Julian Kristoffersen	Norway	FW	2021-2023	8	0
Krzysztof Piątek	Poland	FW	2022-2023	33	4
Ivan Radovanović	Serbia	MF	2022-2023	24	1
Lys Mousset	France	FW	2022	4	0
Dylan Bronn	Tunisia	DF	2022-	28	0
William Troost-Ekong	Nigeria	DF	2023	9	1
Guillermo Ochoa	Mexico	GK	2023-2024	41	0
Jovane Cabral	Cape Verde	MF	2023-2024	12	1
Chukwubuikem Ikwuemesi	Nigeria	FW	2023-	25	1

== 19Key ==
- GK — Goalkeeper
- DF — Defender
- MF — Midfielder
- FW — Forward

Nationalities are indicated by the corresponding FIFA country code.
