= Abbondanza =

Abbondanza is an Italian surname. Notable people with the surname include:

- Alessandro Abbondanza (born 1949), Italian football player and manager
- Marcello Abbondanza (born 1970), Italian volleyball coach

== See also ==
- Andréanne Abbondanza-Bergeron, Canadian contemporary artist
- Colonna dell'Abbondanza, Florence, monumental column
