= Zeefuik =

Zeefuik is a Dutch surname. Notable people with the surname include:

- Deyovaisio Zeefuik (born 1998), Dutch footballer
- Género Zeefuik (born 1990), Dutch footballer
- Lequincio Zeefuik (born 2004), Dutch footballer
