= Iuliano =

Iuliano is an Italian surname. Notable people with the surname include:

- Mark Iuliano (born 1973), Italian footballer and manager
- Rino Iuliano (born 1984), Italian footballer
- Robert Iuliano, American attorney and academic administrator
