= Cesaro =

Cesaro may refer to:

- Cesarò, a town in Italy
- Cesaro (wrestler) (Claudio Castagnoli, born 1980), a Swiss wrestler
- Andrea Cesaro (born 1986), an Italian footballer
- Ernesto Cesàro (1859–1906), an Italian mathematician
  - Cesàro equation
  - Cesàro summation
