= Tobe Leysen =

Belgian association football player

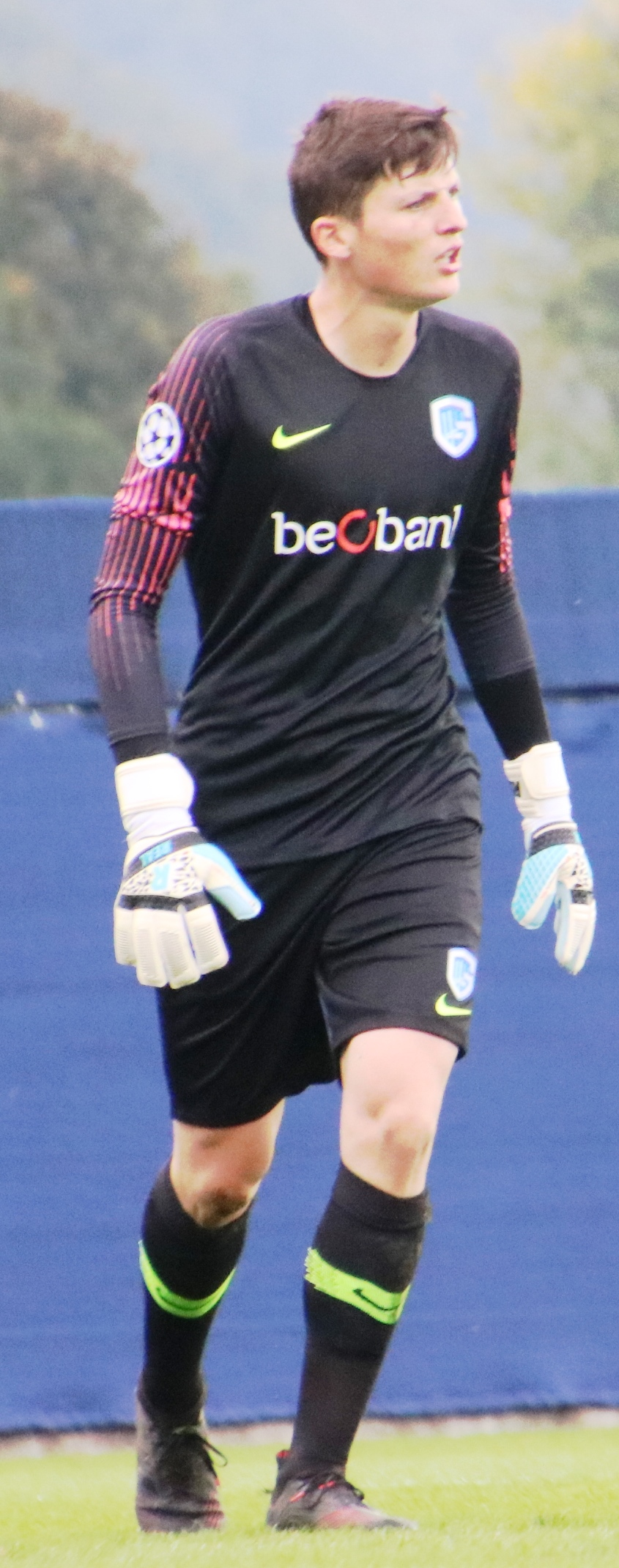

Personal information
- Date of birth: 9 March 2002 (age 24)
- Place of birth: Geel, Belgium
- Height: 1.89 m (6 ft 2 in)
- Position: Goalkeeper

Team information
- Current team: Genk
- Number: 1

Youth career
- –2022: Genk

Senior career*
Years	Team	Apps	(Gls)
2022–2023	Genk	2	(0)
2022–2023	Jong Genk	21	(0)
2023–2026	OH Leuven	93	(0)
2026–	Genk	0	(0)

International career^{‡}
2018	Belgium U16	2	(0)
2019	Belgium U17	3	(0)
2019	Belgium U18	2	(0)
2024	Belgium U21	1	(0)
- * Club domestic league appearances and goals as of 1 June 2026 ‡ National team caps and goals as of 1 September 2024

Tobe Leysen (born 9 March 2002) is a Belgian professional footballer who plays for Genk in the Belgian Pro League.

== Club career ==
Leysen is a youth exponent from Genk. He made his league debut on 10 May 2022 against Sporting Charleroi.

== Career statistics ==
As of match played 17 October 2026

Appearances and goals by club, season and competition
Club	Season	League			Cup		Europe		Other		Total	
Club	Season	Division	Apps	Goals	Apps	Goals	Apps	Goals	Apps	Goals	Apps	Goals
Genk	2021–22	Belgian Pro League	2	0	2	0	—		—		4	0
Jong Genk	2022–23	Challenger Pro League	21	0	—		—		—		21	0
OH Leuven	2023–24	Belgian Pro League	23	0	3	0	—		—		26	0
OH Leuven	2024–25	Belgian Pro League	38	0	3	0	—		—		41	0
OH Leuven	2025–26	Belgian Pro League	32	0	0	0	—		—		32	0
OH Leuven	Total		93	0	6	0	—		—		99	0
Genk	2026–27	Belgian Pro League	0	0	1	0	—		—		1	0
Career total			116	0	9	0	0	0	0	0	125	0

== Honours ==
Genk

- Belgian Cup: 2020–21

== Family ==
He's the brother of Union Saint-Gilloise's Fedde Leysen.
