= Yassine Azzouz =

Moroccan footballer (born 2007)

Personal information
- Full name: Mohamed Yassine Azzouz
- Date of birth: 17 May 2007 (age 19)
- Position: Midfielder

Team information
- Current team: PAOK B

Youth career
- 2013–2016: Lokeren Youth
- 2016–2022: Club Brugge Youth
- 2022–2024: OH Leuven Youth

Senior career*
Years	Team	Apps	(Gls)
2024–2026	OH Leuven U23	49	(2)
2025–2026	OH Leuven	1	(0)
2026–	PAOK B	0	(0)

International career
2023	Morocco U16	7	(1)
2023–2024	Morocco U17	6	(0)
2024	Morocco U18	0	(0)
- * Club domestic league appearances and goals as of 1 May 2026

Mohamed Yassine Azzouz (born 17 May 2007) is a Moroccan professional footballer who plays as a Midfielder for Greek club PAOK B in the Super League Greece 2.

== Career ==
After initial spells at the youth clubs of Lokeren and Club Brugge, Azzouz came over from to OH Leuven and passed through the youth ranks, making his debut for OH Leuven U23 in 2024 in the Belgian Division 1, the highest non-professional level of Belgian football. During the winter break of the 2024–25 season, Azzouz trained with the A-squad and eventually would make his professional debut at the highest level during the final match of the season, as he was subbed on for Chukwubuikem Ikwuemesi during the away match against Sporting Charleroi on 24 May 2025, playing the final 12 minutes of the match. It would be his only match for the A-squad, as for the 2025–26 season he continued to play for OH Leuven U23, where he would go on to rack up 49 appearances and 2 goals.

While OH Leuven had already opened discussions for a prolonged deal for Azzouz, who had again started the 2026–27 season with OH Leuven U23 now as captain, he eventually signed for PAOK B on 16 September 2026.
