= Ezechiel Banzuzi =

Dutch footballer (born 2005)

Personal information
- Date of birth: 16 February 2005 (age 21)
- Place of birth: Zwijndrecht, Netherlands
- Height: 1.91 m (6 ft 3 in)
- Position: Attacking midfielder

Team information
- Current team: RB Leipzig
- Number: 6

Youth career
- –2016: VVGZ
- 2016–2021: NAC Breda

Senior career*
Years	Team	Apps	(Gls)
2021–2023	NAC Breda	51	(5)
2023–2025	OH Leuven	71	(4)
2025–	RB Leipzig	32	(1)

International career^{‡}
2021–2022	Netherlands U17	9	(2)
2022–2023	Netherlands U18	5	(7)
2023–2024	Netherlands U19	10	(4)
2024–2026	Netherlands U21	11	(1)
2026–	DR Congo	1	(0)
Medal record
Men's football
Representing Netherlands
UEFA European Under-17 Championship
Runner-up	2022 Israel
- * Club domestic league appearances and goals as of 31 October 2026 ‡ National team caps and goals as of 2 October 2026

Ezechiel Banzuzi (born 16 February 2005) is a professional footballer who plays as an attacking midfielder for Bundesliga club RB Leipzig. Born in the Netherlands, he represents the DR Congo national team.

== Club career ==
=== NAC Breda ===
Banzuzi progressed through VVGZ and NAC Breda's youth teams, joining the latter at age eleven. He made his professional debut for the club on 26 October 2021, in a cup match against VVV-Venlo, which NAC won on penalties. Banzuzi entered the match as a substitute in the 75th minute, replacing Pjotr Kestens. At the age of sixteen, he appeared in ten matches for NAC without signing a professional contract, attracting interest from other clubs. On 8 January 2022, prior to a match against Eindhoven, Banzuzi hinted at a possible departure through a Snapchat post, which led to his demotion back to the youth team. However, in February 2022, he was reinstated to the first team.

Following this, Banzuzi saw increased playing time in league matches during the 2021–22 season, making a total of 20 appearances, nine of which were as a starter. NAC Breda qualified for the promotion play-offs, where they were eliminated in the first round by ADO Den Haag. In the subsequent season, Banzuzi again helped NAC reach the play-offs, where they initially advanced past MVV in the first round but were eliminated by Emmen. During the regular season, he made 31 appearances, contributing five goals and four assists to the team's qualification for the play-off rounds.

=== OH Leuven ===
On 20 June 2023, Banzuzi signed a three-year contract with Belgian Pro League club OH Leuven.

=== RB Leipzig ===
On 9 April 2025, RB Leipzig officially announced that they had signed a deal with Banzuzi until 30 June 2030, officially joining on 1 July 2025 for a fee of around €16 million.

Banzuzi made his competitive debut for RB Leipzig on 16 August 2025, coming on in the 62nd minute and heading in Castello Lukeba's long pass in the 79th minute to give Leipzig a 3–2 lead in a DFB-Pokal first-round tie away to SV Sandhausen; Xavi Simons added a late fourth as Leipzig won 4–2 after twice falling behind.

== International career ==
Born in the Netherlands, Banzuzi is of Congolese descent. He represented the Netherlands at youth up to the under-21 level. In March 2026, to his own surprise, Banzuzi was called up to the DR Congo U23 national football team, but he declined and remained with the Netherlands under-21 team and played in qualifying matches for the 2027 UEFA European Under-21 Championship that same month.

On 8 September 2026, Banzuzi officially committed to play for the DR Congo national team after obtaining a passport. He also posted on Instagram a picture of himself with a DR Congo jersey to officially announce his decision to play for the country. That month, Banzuzi was first called up by head coach Sébastien Desabre for two 2027 Africa Cup of Nations qualification matches and two friendlies. He made his international debut in a friendly against Uganda on October 2, which they lost 2–0.

== Career statistics ==
=== Club ===
As of match played 31 October 2026

Appearances and goals by club, season and competition
Club	Season	League			National cup (Note: Includes KNVB Cup, Belgian Cup, DFB-Pokal)		Europe		Other		Total	
Club	Season	Division	Apps	Goals	Apps	Goals	Apps	Goals	Apps	Goals	Apps	Goals
NAC Breda	2021–22	Eerste Divisie	20	0	2	0	—		(Note: Appearances in Eredivisie promotion/relegation playoffs)	1	24	1
NAC Breda	2022–23	Eerste Divisie	31	5	0	0	—		4	1	28	2
NAC Breda	Total		51	5	2	0	—		6	2	59	7
OH Leuven	2023–24	Belgian Pro League	37	2	3	1	—		—		40	3
OH Leuven	2024–25	Belgian Pro League	34	2	2	1	—		—		36	3
OH Leuven	Total		71	4	5	2	—		0	0	76	6
RB Leipzig	2025–26	Bundesliga	24	0	4	2	—		—		28	2
RB Leipzig	2026–27	Bundesliga	8	1	2	1	2 (Note: Appearances in UEFA Champions League)	0	—		12	2
RB Leipzig	Total		32	1	6	3	2	0	—		40	4
Career total			154	10	13	5	2	0	6	2	175	17

=== International ===
As of match played 2 October 2026

Appearances and goals by national team and year
National team	Year	Apps	Goals
DR Congo	2026	1	0
Total		1	0
