= Christian Chirieletti =

Italian footballer (born 1988)

Personal information
- Date of birth: 2 March 1988 (age 38)
- Place of birth: Rome, Italy
- Height: 1.76 m (5 ft 9 in)
- Position: Right back

Team information
- Current team: Civitavecchia

Youth career
- Lazio Primavera

Senior career*
Years	Team	Apps	(Gls)
2007–2008	Fanfulla	32	(0)
2008–2010	Orvietana	55	(0)
2010–2011	U.S. Sanremese	14	(0)
2011–2014	Salernitana	40	(0)
2015	Ceahlăul Piatra Neamț	4	(0)
2016	L'Aquila	2	(0)
2016–2017	Monterotondo		
2017–2018	Monti Cimini		
2019–	Civitavecchia		
Total		147	(0)
- * Club domestic league appearances and goals

Christian Chirieletti (born 2 March 1988) is an Italian football right defender who plays for Civitavecchia. In 2015 he had his only experience outside Italy playing in Romania for Liga I club Ceahlăul Piatra Neamț.

== Honours ==
Salernitana

- Lega Pro Seconda Divisione: 2012–13
- Serie D: 2011–12
