= Antef Tsoungui =

English footballer (born 2002)

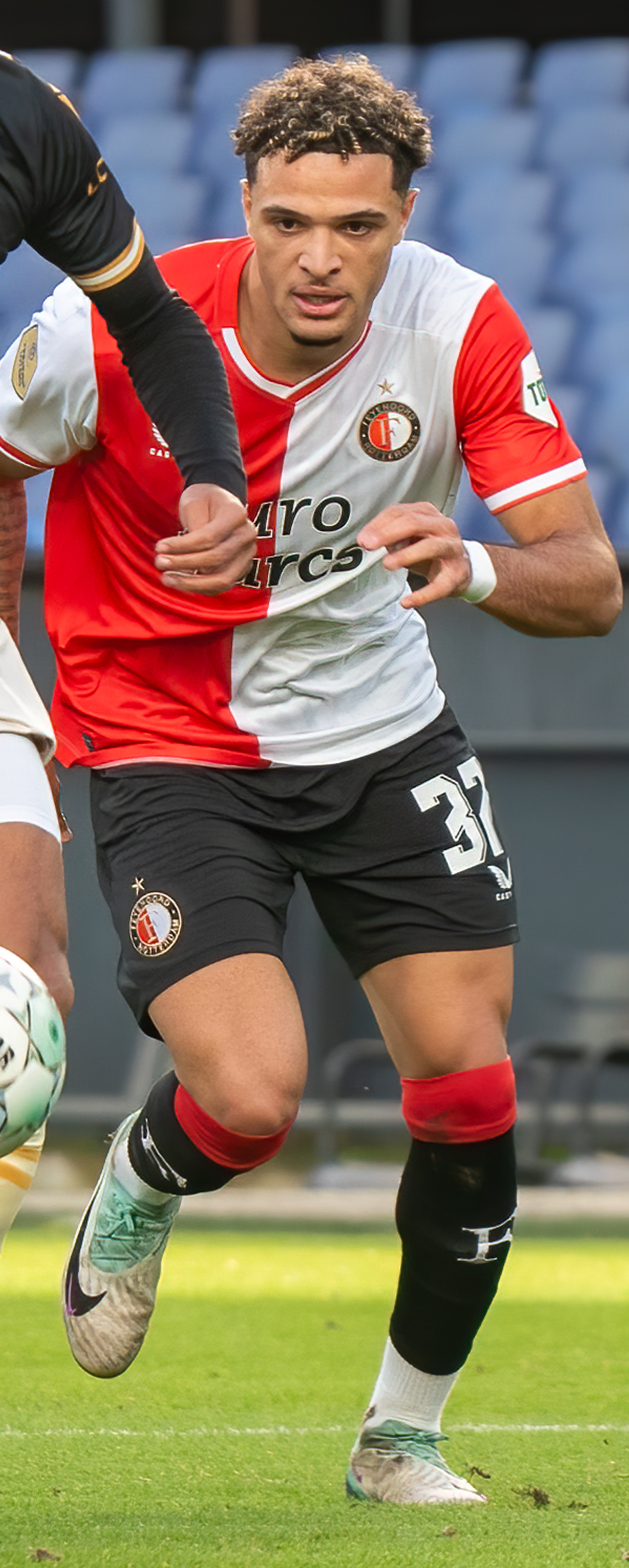

Personal information
- Full name: Antef Tsoungui
- Date of birth: 30 December 2002 (age 23)
- Place of birth: Brussels, Belgium
- Height: 1.85 m (6 ft 1 in)
- Position: Centre-back

Team information
- Current team: Estoril
- Number: 5

Youth career
- –2018: Chelsea
- 2018–2023: Brighton & Hove Albion

Senior career*
Years	Team	Apps	(Gls)
2021–2023	Brighton & Hove Albion	0	(0)
2023	→ Lommel (loan)	5	(0)
2023–2025	Feyenoord	0	(0)
2023–2024	→ Dordrecht (loan)	28	(1)
2024–2025	→ OH Leuven (loan)	2	(0)
2025–	Estoril	23	(0)

International career
2017	Belgium U15	1	(0)
2019	Belgium U17	4	(0)
2019	Belgium U18	1	(0)
2024	Belgium U21	1	(0)
- * Club domestic league appearances and goals as of 25 May 2026

Antef Tsoungui (born 30 December 2002) is a Belgian professional footballer who plays as a centre-back for Primeira Liga club Estoril.

== Early life ==
Tsoungui was born in Belgium to a Cameroonian father and Italian mother. Aged four, he migrated to Crawley with his parents.

== Club career ==
=== Brighton & Hove Albion ===
An academy player at Chelsea through to under-15 level, Tsoungui joined the Brighton & Hove Albion Academy in 2018. He made his professional debut for Brighton on 24 August 2021 in a 2–0 EFL Cup victory against Cardiff City.

On 31 January 2023, Tsoungui joined Challenger Pro League club Lommel on loan for the remainder of the 2022-23 Season. On 24 March, his loan contract with the Belgian club would be terminated after only five appearances, including two in the Challenger Pro League.

=== Feyenoord ===
On 12 June 2023, Tsoungui signed for Eredivisie champions Feyenoord for an undisclosed fee.

Later in the month of his signing, Feyenoord announced that he would spend the 2023–2024 season on loan at Eerste Divisie side FC Dordrecht.

On 13 August 2024, Tsoungui joined Belgian Pro League club OH Leuven on a season-long loan deal. After making just two appearances for OH Leuven in the beginning of the season, Tsoungui suffered a severe cruciate ligament tear on training, rendering him out for several months. Tsoungui would not make a single appearance for the Belgian club and returned to Feyenoord as the loan deal ended. While still under contract until 2026, Feyenoord released Tsoungui to Estoril Praia at the end of the summer 2025 transfer window.

== Career statistics ==
As of match played 15 December 2023

Appearances and goals by club, season and competition
Club	Season	League			National cup		League cup		Other		Total	
Club	Season	Division	Apps	Goals	Apps	Goals	Apps	Goals	Apps	Goals	Apps	Goals
Brighton & Hove Albion	2021–22	Premier League	0	0	0	0	1	0	—		1	0
Brighton & Hove Albion U21	2021–22	—			—		—		1 (Note: Appearances in EFL Trophy)	0	1	0
Brighton & Hove Albion U21	2022–23	—			—		—		3	0	3	0
Brighton & Hove Albion U21	Total		—		—		—		4	0	4	0
Lommel (loan)	2022–23	Challenger Pro League	2	0	—		—		3 (Note: Challenger Pro League relegation play-offs)	0	5	0
Feyenoord	2023–24	Eredivisie	0	0	0	0	—		0	0	0	0
FC Dordrecht (loan)	2023–24	Eerste Divisie	16	1	0	0	—		—		16	1
Career total			18	1	0	0	1	0	7	0	26	1
