= Luca Orlando =

Italian footballer

Personal information
- Date of birth: 26 December 1990 (age 35)
- Place of birth: Salerno, Italy
- Height: 1.77 m (5 ft 10 in)
- Position: Forward

Team information
- Current team: Manfredonia

Youth career
- –2010: Salernitana

Senior career*
Years	Team	Apps	(Gls)
2010–2011	Salernitana	8	(2)
2010–2011	→ Pro Vercelli (loan)	14	(0)
2011–2013	Paganese	50	(18)
2013	Portogruaro	12	(2)
2013–2014	Aversa Normanna	34	(12)
2014–2015	Messina	36	(7)
2015–2016	Ischia	11	(1)
2016	Pro Piacenza	14	(2)
2016–2017	Casertana	31	(3)
2017–2018	Prato	25	(1)
2018–2019	Matera	14	(0)
2019–2021	Savoia	29	(2)
2021	Siena	16	(3)
2021	FC Messina		
2021–2022	Chieti	21	(2)
2022–2023	Portici	20	(4)
2023	Matese	10	(0)
2023–	Manfredonia	0	(0)
- * Club domestic league appearances and goals as of 7 January 2024

Luca Orlando (born 26 December 1990) is an Italian football player who plays for Serie D club Manfredonia.

== Club career ==
He made his Serie B debut for Salernitana in 2010.
