= Nathan Rodes =

Belgian footballer

Personal information
- Date of birth: 11 December 1997 (age 28)
- Place of birth: Etterbeek, Belgium
- Height: 1.91 m (6 ft 3 in)
- Position: Midfielder

Team information
- Current team: Dender
- Number: 18

Youth career
- White Star Woluwe

Senior career*
Years	Team	Apps	(Gls)
2015–2016	Woluwe-Zaventem	20	(0)
2016–2017	KSC Grimbergen	15	(1)
2017–2020	Charleroi	0	(0)
2019–2020	→ Titus Pétange (loan)	6	(0)
2021–2022	RFC Liège	28	(4)
2022–	Dender	133	(6)
- * Club domestic league appearances and goals as of 11 May 2026

Nathan Rodes (born 11 December 1997) is a Belgian footballer who plays for Dender.
