= Manuel Osifo =

Belgian footballer

Personal information
- Date of birth: 31 July 2003 (age 23)
- Place of birth: Ostend, Belgium
- Positions: Defensive midfielder; centre-back

Team information
- Current team: OH Leuven
- Number: 25

Youth career
- 2011–2021: KV Oostende

Senior career*
Years	Team	Apps	(Gls)
2021–2024	KV Oostende	29	(0)
2024–	OH Leuven U23	4	(0)
2024–	OH Leuven	23	(0)
2025–2026	→ Kortrijk (loan)	24	(2)
- * Club domestic league appearances and goals as of 16 July 2026

Manuel Osifo (born 31 July 2003) is a Belgian professional footballer who plays as a defensive midfielder or a centre-back for Belgian Pro League club OH Leuven.

== Career ==
Osifo signed his first professional contract with KV Oostende on 3 August 2021.

== Personal life ==
Born in Belgium, Osifo is of Nigerian descent.
