= Siebe Schrijvers =

Belgian footballer

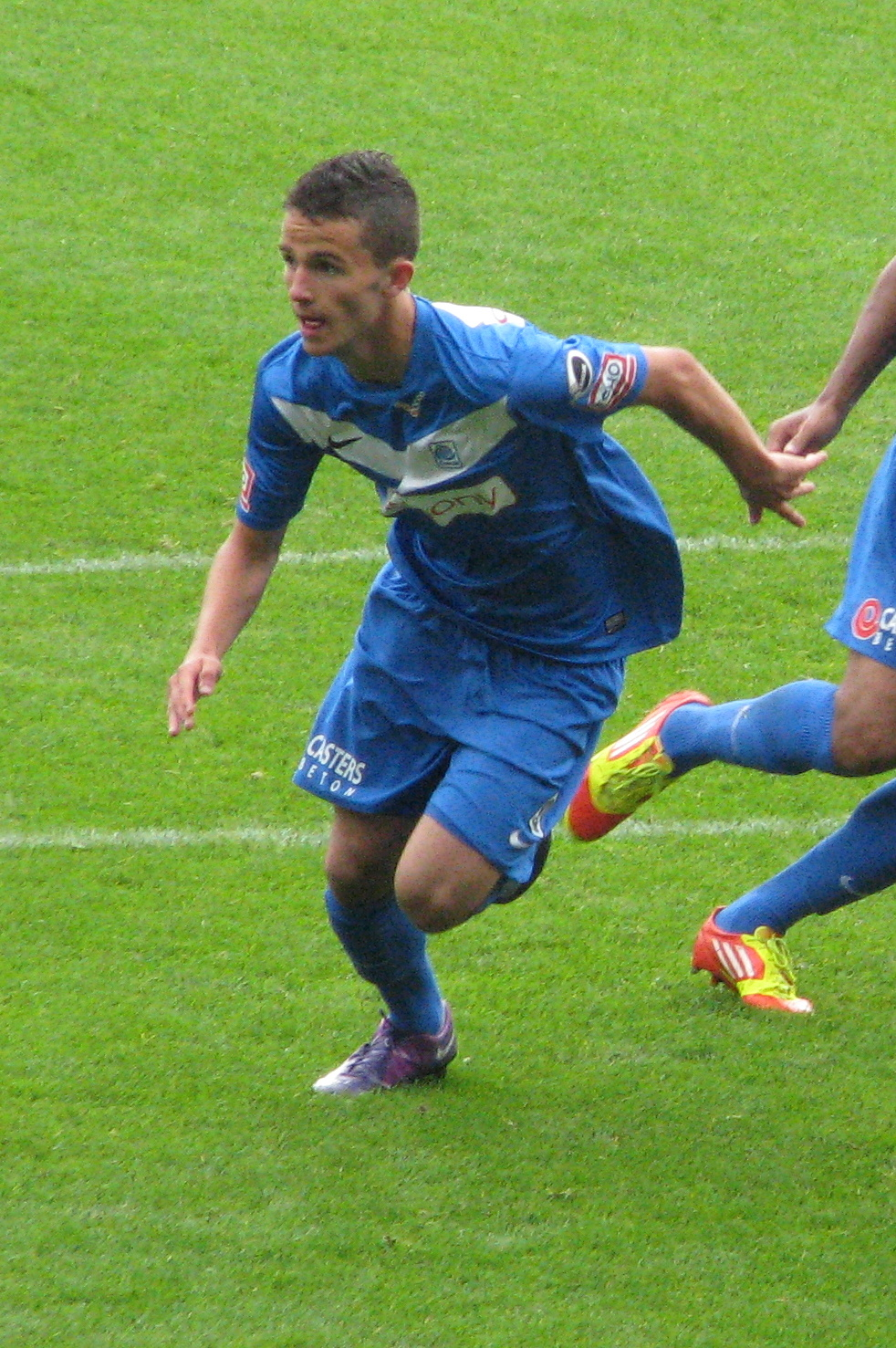

Personal information
- Date of birth: 18 July 1996 (age 30)
- Place of birth: Lommel, Belgium
- Height: 1.81 m (5 ft 11 1/2 in)
- Position: Attacking midfielder

Team information
- Current team: Oud-Heverlee Leuven
- Number: 8

Youth career
- 2002–2004: Racing Peer
- 2004–2012: Genk

Senior career*
Years	Team	Apps	(Gls)
2013–2018	Genk	107	(16)
2016	→ Waasland-Beveren (loan)	34	(9)
2018–2021	Club Brugge	64	(16)
2021–	Oud-Heverlee Leuven	168	(21)

International career^{‡}
2010–2011	Belgium U15	5	(1)
2011–2013	Belgium U17	18	(4)
2013–2015	Belgium U19	17	(6)
2016–2019	Belgium U21	23	(4)
- * Club domestic league appearances and goals as of 1 June 2026 ‡ National team caps and goals as of 07:30, 23 June 2019 (UTC)

Siebe Schrijvers (born 18 July 1996) is a Belgian footballer who currently plays for Oud-Heverlee Leuven. He plays as an attacking midfielder.

== Career ==
On 6 December 2012, he made his debut for Genk in the UEFA Europa League against FC Basel. His league debut came on the final day of the 2012–2013 season against Club Brugge replacing the injured Benjamin De Ceulaer at half-time. He scored his first league goal at 19 October 2013 against Lierse S.K.

In June 2018, it was announced Schrijvers would join Club Brugge for the 2018–19 season having agreed a four-year contract until 2022. The transfer fee paid to Genk was reported as €3 million.

== Career statistics ==
=== Club ===
As of match played 17 May 2024

Appearances and goals by club, season and competition
Club	Season	League			Cup		Europe (Note: Includes UEFA Europa League and UEFA Champions League.)		Other (Note: Includes Belgian Pro League playoffs and Belgian Super Cup.)		Total	
Club	Season	Division	Apps	Goals	Apps	Goals	Apps	Goals	Apps	Goals	Apps	Goals
Genk	2012–13	Belgian First Division A	0	0	2	0	1	0	1	0	4	0
Genk	2013–14	Belgian First Division A	5	1	2	0	3	0	8	1	18	2
Genk	2014–15	Belgian First Division A	27	5	1	0	0	0	5	0	33	5
Genk	2015–16	Belgian First Division A	11	0	3	0	0	0	0	0	14	0
Genk	2016–17	Belgian First Division A	8	1	1	0	6	0	10	3	25	4
Genk	2017–18	Belgian First Division A	27	5	5	0	0	0	5	0	37	5
Genk	Total		78	12	14	0	10	0	29	4	131	16
Waasland-Beveren (loan)	2015–16	Belgian First Division A	9	3	0	0	0	0	6	1	15	4
Waasland-Beveren (loan)	2016–17	Belgian First Division A	19	5	2	0	0	0	0	0	21	5
Waasland-Beveren (loan)	Total		28	8	2	0	0	0	6	1	36	9
Club Brugge	2018–19	Belgian First Division A	24	11	1	0	4	0	9	1	38	12
Club Brugge	2019–20	Belgian First Division A	22	4	6	0	6	0	0	0	34	4
Club Brugge	2020–21	Belgian First Division A	10	0	0	0	3	0	0	0	13	0
Club Brugge	Total		56	15	7	0	13	0	9	1	85	16
OH Leuven	2020–21	Belgian First Division A	12	2	1	0	0	0	0	0	13	2
OH Leuven	2021–22	Belgian First Division A	32	4	3	1	0	0	0	0	35	5
OH Leuven	2022–23	Belgian First Division A	16	2	1	0	0	0	0	0	17	2
OH Leuven	2023–24	Belgian First Division A	38	3	2	0	0	0	0	0	40	3
OH Leuven	Total		98	11	7	1	0	0	0	0	105	12
Career total			260	46	30	1	23	0	44	6	357	53

== Honours ==
Club Brugge

- Belgian Super Cup: 2018

=== Individual ===
- Belgian Pro League top assist provider: 2016–17
