= Andréanne Abbondanza-Bergeron =

Canadian artist

Andréanne Abbondanza-Bergeron is a Canadian contemporary artist working in installation, sculpture and photography. She lives and works in Montreal, Quebec.

== Education ==
- MFA in Sculpture, 2013–2016, Concordia University
- MA in Art Education, 2007–2010, Concordia University
- BFA in Studio Arts, 2004–2007, Concordia University
- Architectural Design, 2003–2004, Université de Montréal

== Works ==
Her work Suspensus was presented as part of the exhibition IGNITION 12 at the Leonard & Bina Ellen Art Gallery, Montreal.

Abbondanza-Bergeron presented her MFA thesis exhibition, dis]JUNCTION, in 2016 at the Maison de la Culture Frontenac.

She was the recipient of the 2016 Yvonne L. Bombardier Graduate Scholarship in Visual Arts.

In 2018, Abbondanza-Bergeron's piece Tipping Point was installed in the Kitchener City Hall Rotunda as part of the Contemporary Art Forum Kitchener and Area "CAFKA.18" exhibit.

== Exhibitions ==
- Maison de la Culture Frontenac, Montreal
- Leonard & Bina Ellen Gallery, Montreal
- Centre d'exposition de Val-D'or, Montreal
- Market Gallery, Glasgow
- Centre des arts et de la culture de Brompton, Sherbrooke
- Articule, Montreal
- Canadian Sculpture Centre, Toronto
