= Birger Verstraete =

Belgian footballer

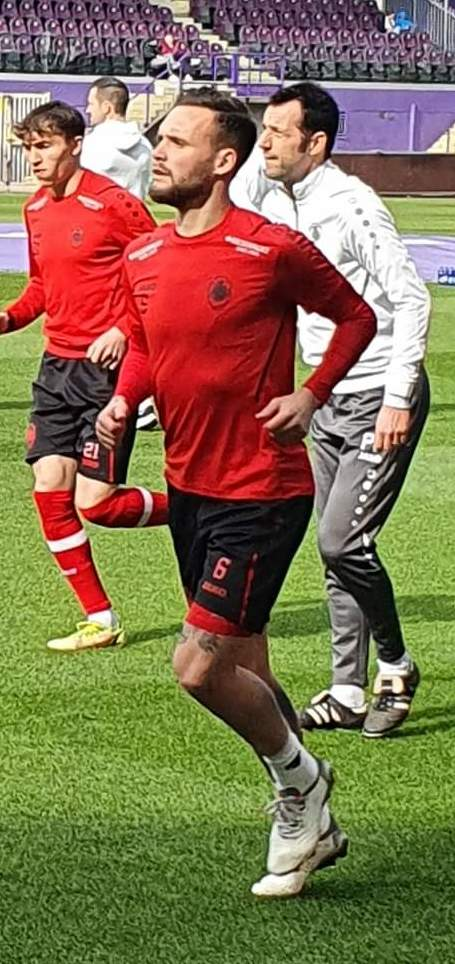
- Verstraete in 2022

Personal information
- Date of birth: 16 April 1994 (age 32)
- Place of birth: Ostend, Belgium
- Height: 1.74 m (5 ft 9 in)
- Position: Defensive midfielder

Team information
- Current team: OH Leuven
- Number: 4

Senior career*
Years	Team	Apps	(Gls)
2011–2015	Club Brugge	6	(0)
2014–2015	→ Royal Mouscron (loan)	6	(0)
2015–2017	Kortrijk	38	(0)
2017–2019	Gent	68	(6)
2019–2020	1. FC Köln	9	(0)
2020–2021	→ Antwerp (loan)	23	(1)
2021–2023	Antwerp	35	(2)
2022–2023	→ Mechelen (loan)	20	(2)
2023–2024	Aris	24	(0)
2024–	OH Leuven	61	(0)

International career
2010	Belgium U16	1	(0)
2012–2013	Belgium U19	13	(2)
2016	Belgium U21	3	(0)
2018	Belgium	1	(0)
- * Club domestic league appearances and goals as of 1 June 2026

Birger Verstraete (born 16 April 1994) is a Belgian professional footballer who plays as a defensive midfielder for Belgian Pro League club OH Leuven. Verstraete has played once for the Belgium national team.

== Club career ==
From Ostend, Verstraete came through the youth ranks at Club Brugge as a central midfielder, but only played six league games for the Blauw-Zwart before moving to Kortrijk in 2015.

Two seasons followed at the Guldensporen before a big step-up to join Gent in 2017, who had won the Belgian title two years earlier.

A poor start to the season saw the dismissal of coach Hein Vanhaezebrouck, but the Buffaloes rallied to finish fourth under Yves Vanderhaeghe.

A further fifth-placed finish and decent run to the 2018–19 Belgian Cup Final - where they were beaten 2–1 by Mechelen despite having taken the lead - alerted clubs from across the border in Germany, particularly 1. FC Köln.

Verstraete only played nine games in the Bundesliga before returning to the Belgian Pro League with Royal Antwerp in 2020, at first on loan. As part of a dynamic Great Old side under first Ivan Leko and then Frank Vercauteren, Verstraete helped Antwerp to a third-place finish in the 2020–21 season, the club's highest placing since their previous league title in 1957. However, he was not allowed play in the COVID-delayed 2020 Belgian Cup Final win over his former side Club Brugge, as he had not been signed by the time of the original date of the decider in April 2020.

The following season under Danish coach Brian Priske, Royal Antwerp finished fourth, after losing home and away to Anderlecht in the 2021–22 league championship play-offs.

On 6 September 2022, Verstraete joined Mechelen on loan, helping them win their fight against relegation, and aiding their run to the 2023 Belgian Cup Final against Royal Antwerp.

On 11 September 2023, he signed a two-year contract with Aris.

== International career ==
Verstraete made his Belgium national team debut on 7 September 2018 in a friendly against Scotland.

== Career statistics ==
As of 14 September 2023

Appearances and goals by club, season and competition
Club	Season	League			Cup		Continental		Other		Total	
Club	Season	Division	Apps	Goals	Apps	Goals	Apps	Goals	Apps	Goals	Apps	Goals
Club Brugge	2012–13	Belgian Pro League	4	0	1	0	1	0	—		6	0
Club Brugge	2011–12	Belgian Pro League	4	0	0	0	1	0	—		5	0
Club Brugge	Total		8	0	1	0	2	0	—		11	0
Royal Mouscron (loan)	2014–15	Belgian Pro League	11	1	1	0	—		—		12	1
Kortrijk	2015–16	Belgian Pro League	18	0	1	0	—		—		19	0
Kortrijk	2016–17	Belgian First Division A	20	0	3	0	—		—		23	0
Kortrijk	Total		38	0	4	0	—		—		42	0
Gent	2016–17	Belgian First Division A	8	0	—		—		—		8	0
Gent	2017–18	Belgian First Division A	26	1	1	0	1	0	—		28	1
Gent	2018–19	Belgian First Division A	34	5	4	0	4	0	—		42	5
Gent	Total		68	6	5	0	5	0	—		78	6
1. FC Köln	2019–20	Bundesliga	9	0	1	0	—		—		10	0
Antwerp (loan)	2020–21	Belgian First Division A	23	1	2	0	6	0	—		31	1
Antwerp	2021–22	Belgian First Division A	31	2	1	0	8	0	—		40	2
Antwerp	2022–23	Belgian Pro League	4	0	0	0	6	1	—		10	1
Antwerp	Total		35	2	1	0	14	1	—		50	3
Mechelen (loan)	2022–23	Belgian Pro League	20	2	5	0	—		—		25	2
Career total			212	12	20	0	27	1	0	0	259	13
