= Mathéo Parmentier =

Belgian footballer

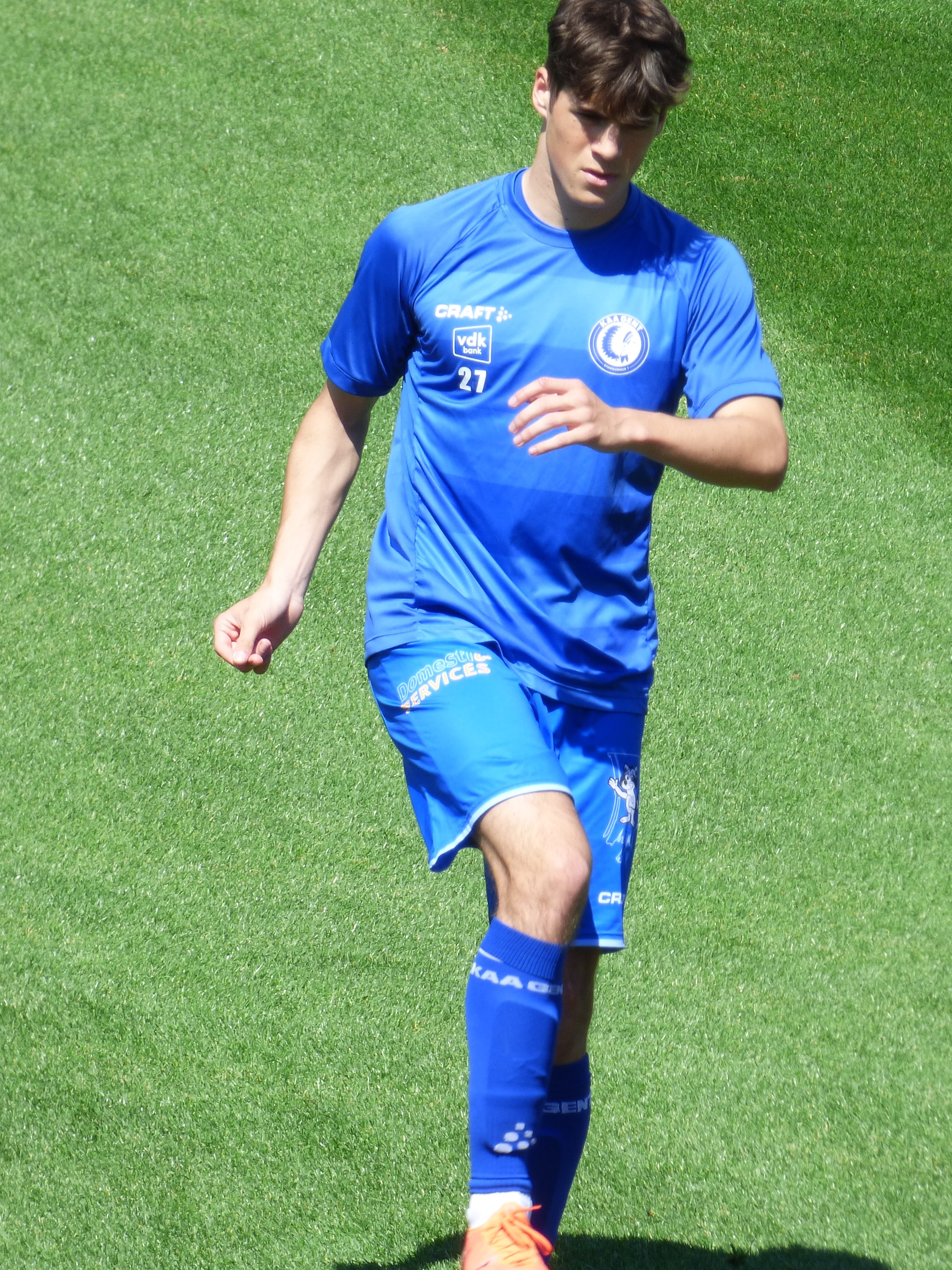
- Parmentier in 2020

Personal information
- Date of birth: 31 October 2002 (age 24)
- Place of birth: Anderlecht, Belgium
- Height: 1.86 m (6 ft 1 in)
- Position: Defensive midfielder

Team information
- Current team: OH Leuven U23

Youth career
- Dender EH
- –2020: Lokeren
- 2020–2023: Gent

Senior career*
Years	Team	Apps	(Gls)
2020	Lokeren	4	(0)
2020–2023	Gent	1	(0)
2022–2023	Jong Gent	12	(1)
2023–2026	OH Leuven U23	48	(5)
- * Club domestic league appearances and goals as of 11 February 2026

Mathéo Parmentier (born 31 October 2002) is a Belgian professional footballer who is currently unemployed after most recently playing as a defensive midfielder for OH Leuven U23.

== Career ==
Parmentier started his professional career at Lokeren. After the club was declared bankrupt on 20 April 2020, he moved to Gent as a free agent, signing a three-year contract.

== Career statistics ==
=== Club ===
As of 30 July 2020.

Appearances and goals by club, season and competition
Club	Season	League			Cup		Continental		Other		Total	
Club	Season	Division	Apps	Goals	Apps	Goals	Apps	Goals	Apps	Goals	Apps	Goals
Lokeren	2019–20	Proximus League	4	0	0	0	0	0	0	0	4	0
Career total			4	0	0	0	0	0	0	0	4	0
