= Roméo Monticelli =

Belgian footballer (born 2005)

Personal information
- Full name: Roméo Maximilien Monticelli
- Date of birth: 2 October 2005 (age 21)
- Place of birth: Belgium
- Position: Left-back

Team information
- Current team: Francs Borains

Youth career
- –2014: Royal Géants Athois
- 2015–2018: Tubize
- 2018–2022: Charleroi

Senior career*
Years	Team	Apps	(Gls)
2022–2024	Charleroi	4	(0)
2022–2024	Zébra Élites	37	(0)
2024–2026	OH Leuven U23	43	(1)
2025–2026	OH Leuven	1	(0)
2026–	Francs Borains	0	(0)

International career
2022	Belgium U17	5	(0)
2021–2022	Belgium U18	3	(0)
2023	Belgium U19	3	(0)
- * Club domestic league appearances and goals as of 24 May 2026

Roméo Maximilien Monticelli (born 2 October 2005) is a Belgian football player who plays as a left-back for Challenger Pro League club Francs Borains.

== International career ==
Monticelli was born in Belgium, and is of Italian descent through his father. He is a youth international for Belgium.
