= Lequincio Zeefuik =

Dutch footballer (born 2004)

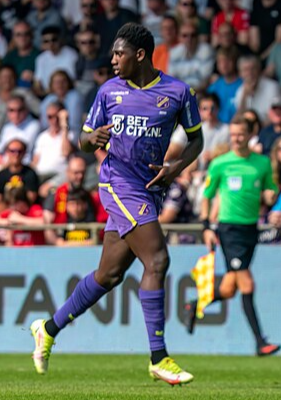
- Zeefuik with Volendam in 2023

Personal information
- Date of birth: 26 November 2004 (age 21)
- Place of birth: Amsterdam, Netherlands
- Height: 1.97 m (6 ft 6 in)
- Position: Forward

Team information
- Current team: Fortuna Sittard (on loan from AZ)
- Number: 25

Youth career
- –2013: ASV–DWV
- 2013–201?: DVC Buiksloot
- 201?–2017: JOGA Fortius
- 2017–2021: Volendam

Senior career*
Years	Team	Apps	(Gls)
2021–2024	Volendam	43	(6)
2021–2023	Jong Volendam	21	(4)
2024–	AZ	19	(0)
2024–	Jong AZ	19	(3)
2025	→ OH Leuven (loan)	16	(0)
2026	→ Heracles Almelo (loan)	13	(2)
2026–	→ Fortuna Sittard (loan)	0	(0)

International career^{‡}
2026–	Netherlands U21	2	(0)
- * Club domestic league appearances and goals as of 29 June 2026 ‡ National team caps and goals as of 31 March 2026

Lequincio Zeefuik (born 26 November 2004) is a Dutch professional footballer who plays a forward for Eredivisie club Fortuna Sittard, on loan from AZ.

== Career ==
Having joined the youth academy of FC Volendam in 2017, he signed his first professional contract with the club in April 2021, lasting for three years. He scored on his debut for the club on 25 April 2021 at the age of 16 years and 150 days, making him the youngest player to score during his professional debut in Dutch football since Henk Vos in 1984.

On 1 February 2024, Zeefuik signed a five-and-a-half-year contract with AZ. After only featuring three times for AZ in the Eredivisie and mainly playing for Jong AZ at the second level, on 14 January 2025 Zeefuik was loaned until the end of the season to Belgian Pro League team OH Leuven to gain more match experience. The loan deal included a buy-option.

On 8 January 2026, Zeefuik was loaned by Heracles Almelo, with an option to buy. On 29 June 2026, Zeefuik was loaned out once again, this time to Eredivisie side Fortuna Sittard.

== Personal life ==
He is the brother of fellow footballers Deyovaisio Zeefuik and Género Zeefuik.

== Career statistics ==
As of 26 April 2026

Appearances and goals by club, season and competition
Club	Season	League			Cup		Europe		Other		Total	
Club	Season	Division	Apps	Goals	Apps	Goals	Apps	Goals	Apps	Goals	Apps	Goals
Volendam	2020–21	Eerste Divisie	4	1	1	0	—		1 (Note: Appearance(s) in Eerste Divisie promotion play-offs)	0	6	1
Volendam	2021–22	Eerste Divisie	9	0	1	0	—		—		10	0
Volendam	2022–23	Eredivisie	14	2	2	1	—		—		16	3
Volendam	2023–24	Eredivisie	16	3	1	0	—		—		17	3
Volendam	Total		43	6	5	1	—		1	0	49	7
Jong Volendam	2021–22	Tweede Divisie	11	2	—		—		1 (Note: Appearance(s) in Tweede Divisie promotion/relegation play-offs)	0	12	2
Jong Volendam	2022–23	Tweede Divisie	10	2	—		—		—		10	2
Jong Volendam	Total		21	4	—		—		1	0	22	4
AZ	2023–24	Eredivisie	6	0	1	0	0	0	—		7	0
AZ	2024–25	Eredivisie	3	0	0	0	0	0	—		3	0
AZ	2025–26	Eredivisie	10	0	0	0	4 (Note: Appearances in UEFA Conference League)	1	—		14	1
AZ	Total		19	0	1	0	4	1	—		24	1
Jong AZ	2023–24	Eerste Divisie	2	0	—		—		—		2	0
Jong AZ	2024–25	Eerste Divisie	12	2	—		—		—		12	2
Jong AZ	Total		14	2	—		—		—		14	2
OH Leuven (loan)	2024–25	Belgian Pro League	16	0	—		—		—		16	0
Heracles (loan)	2025–26	Eredivisie	13	2	1	0	—		—		14	2
Fortuna Sittard (loan)	2026–27	Eredivisie	0	0	0	0	—		—		0	0
Career total			126	14	7	1	4	1	2	0	139	16
