= Ayumu Ōhata =

Japanese footballer (born 2001)

Ayumu Ōhata 大畑 歩夢
Personal information
- Full name: Ayumu Ōhata
- Date of birth: 27 April 2001 (age 25)
- Place of birth: Fukuoka, Japan
- Height: 1.68 m (5 ft 6 in)
- Position: Left back

Team information
- Current team: Cerezo Osaka
- Number: 66

Youth career
- –2016: Kokura Minami FC
- 2017–2019: Sagan Tosu

Senior career*
Years	Team	Apps	(Gls)
2020–2021	Sagan Tosu	43	(0)
2022–2024	Urawa Red Diamonds	45	(0)
2025	OH Leuven	5	(0)
2025–	Cerezo Osaka	29	(0)
Medal record
Men's football
Representing Japan
AFC U-23 Asian Cup
Gold medal – first place	2024 Qatar	Team
- * Club domestic league appearances and goals as of 10 August 2026

Ayumu Ōhata (大畑 歩夢, Ōhata Ayumu; born 27 April 2001) is a Japanese professional footballer who plays as a left back for J1 League club Cerezo Osaka.

== Club career ==
On 11 August 2025, Ōhata returned to Japan and joined Cerezo Osaka.

== International career ==
On 4 April 2024, Ōhata was called up to the Japan U23 squad for the 2024 AFC U-23 Asian Cup.

== Career statistics ==
=== Club ===
As of 1 February 2023.

Appearances and goals by club, season and competition
Club	Season	League			National cup		League cup		Other		Total	
Club	Season	Division	Apps	Goals	Apps	Goals	Apps	Goals	Apps	Goals	Apps	Goals
Japan			League		Emperor's Cup		J. League Cup		Other		Total	
Sagan Tosu	2020	J1 League	13	0	0	0	1	0	–		14	0
Sagan Tosu	2021	J1 League	30	0	3	0	4	0	–		37	0
Sagan Tosu	Total		43	0	3	0	5	0	0	0	51	0
Urawa Red Diamonds	2022	J1 League	22	0	1	0	2	0	6 (Note: Appearances in the AFC Champions League)	0	31	0
Urawa Red Diamonds	2023	J1 League	0	0	0	0	0	0	0	0	0	0
Career total			65	0	4	0	7	0	6	0	82	0

== Honours ==
=== Club ===
Urawa Red Diamonds

- AFC Champions League: 2022

=== International ===
Japan U23

- AFC U-23 Asian Cup: 2024
