= Morris Molinari =

Italian footballer

Personal information
- Full name: Morris Molinari
- Date of birth: 4 April 1975 (age 51)
- Place of birth: Udine, Italy
- Height: 1.91 m (6 ft 3 in)
- Position: Centre back

Senior career*
| Years | Team | Apps | (Gls) |
| 1995–1996 | Ascoli | 7 | (0) |
| 1996–1998 | Saronno | 60 | (4) |
| 1998–1999 | Udinese | 0 | (0) |
| 1999–2000 | Monza | 6 | (0) |
| 2000–2001 | Gualdo | 19 | (1) |
| 2001–2002 | Sudtirol | 29 | (6) |
| 2002–2003 | Teramo | 32 | (9) |
| 2003–2004 | Triestina | 8 | (0) |
| 2004 | Reggiana | 9 | (0) |
| 2004–2006 | Frosinone | 26 | (0) |
| 2006–2007 | Virtus Lanciano | 21 | (0) |
| 2007–2009 | Gallipoli | 57 | (5) |
| 2009–2010 | Pescina | 22 | (0) |
| 2010–2012 | Juve Stabia | 55 | (2) |
| 2012–2014 | Salernitana | 38 | (3) |
- * Club domestic league appearances and goals as of 18:58, 27 August 2013 (UTC) ‡ National team caps and goals as of 18:58, 27 August 2013 (UTC)

Morris Molinari (born 4 April 1975) is a former Italian football defender.

== Career ==
During his football career, Molinari, he donned the jersey of many football clubs like Monza, Triestina, Juve Stabia in Serie B, while in the inferior leagues he donned the jersey of Ascoli, Reggiana, Frosinone, Virtus Lanciano, Gallipoli, etc. In total, between 1995 and 2012, he played 360 football games, including 45 in Serie B.

In the 2012–2013 and 2013–2014 seasons, he played with Salernitana after finishing his contract with Juve Stabia. In 2014, he retired from professional football.

== Honours and awards ==
- Serie C1 promotion: 2005–06 (Frosinone)
- Lega Pro Prima Divisione promotion: 2008–09 (Gallipoli)
- Supercoppa di Lega di Prima Divisione winner: 2008–09 (Gallipoli)
- Lega Pro Prima Divisione promotion: 2010–11 (Juve Stabia)
- Coppa Italia Lega Pro winner: 2010–11 (Juve Stabia)
- Lega Pro Seconda Divisione promotion: 2012–13 (Salernitana)
