= Rino Iuliano =

Italian footballer

Personal information
- Date of birth: 10 March 1984 (age 42)
- Place of birth: Pagani, Italy
- Height: 1.86 m (6 ft 1 in)
- Position: Goalkeeper

Team information
- Current team: Casarano
- Number: 1

Youth career
- –2002: Salernitana

Senior career*
Years	Team	Apps	(Gls)
2002–2004	Battipagliese		
2004–2007	Potenza		
2008–2011	Salernitana	9	(0)
2011–2013	Campobasso	46	(0)
2013–2015	Messina	24	(0)
2015–2016	Ischia	30	(0)
2016–2017	Prato	6	(0)
2017–2018	Avellino	0	(0)
2019–	Casarano	0	(0)
- * Club domestic league appearances and goals as of 15 January 2019

Rino Iuliano (born 10 March 1984) is an Italian football player who plays for Casarano.

== Club career ==
He made his professional debut in the Serie B for Salernitana on 2 April 2010 in a game against Reggina.
