= Alessandro Abbondanza =

Italian footballer and manager (born 1949)

Personal information
- Date of birth: 8 January 1949 (age 77)
- Place of birth: Naples, Italy
- Height: 1.72 m (5 ft 7 1/2 in)
- Position: Forward

Senior career*
Years	Team	Apps	(Gls)
1967–1968	→ Napoli	0	(0)
1968	Monza Brianza 1912 (loan)	4	(0)
1968–1969	Napoli	4	(0)
1969–1970	→ Pisa (loan)	18	(2)
1970–1971	Napoli	15	(2)
1971–1972	→ Lazio (loan)	27	(7)
1972–1973	Napoli	16	(0)
1973–1974	Brindisi	20	(1)
1974–1975	Sorrento	33	(9)
1975–1977	Salernitana	67	(7)
1977–1978	Crotone	20	(1)
1978–1979	Paganese	31	(2)
1979	Toronto Blizzard	3	(0)

Managerial career
- 1993–1994: Ischia Isolaverde
- 2004–2007: Sorrento
- * Club domestic league appearances and goals as of 17 February 2015

Alessandro Abbondanza (born 8 January 1949) is an Italian former football player and manager. A former forward, he spent most of his playing career with Napoli in Serie A, in addition to other, smaller Italian clubs, mainly situated in the Neapolitan region; he also had a spell in Canada with Toronto Blizzard. He later coached Ischia Isolaverde and Sorrento.
