= Andrea Cesaro =

Italian footballer (born 1986)

Personal information
- Date of birth: 10 April 1986 (age 40)
- Place of birth: Rome, Italy
- Position: Midfielder

Youth career
- ?–2002: Roma

Senior career*
Years	Team	Apps	(Gls)
2004–2007	Celano	74	(7)
2005–2006	→ Internazionale (loan)	0	(0)
2007–2008	Salernitana	1	(0)
2008–2010	Celano	41	(1)
- * Club domestic league appearances and goals as of 20 May 2012

Andrea Cesaro (born 10 April 1986) is an Italian footballer who most recently played for Celano.

== Biography ==
Born in Rome, Lazio, Cesaro started his career with A.S. Roma. In 2002, he was released. He then played for Serie D team Celano. In July 2005 he was loaned to Internazionale's youth team but returned to Celano in mid-season. The club won promotion to Serie C2 as playoff winner in 2006.

In the 2007–08 season, he was sold to Serie C1 team Salernitana in co-ownership deal but bought back by Celano in June 2008.

== Honours ==
- Serie C1: 2008
