= Chukwubuikem Ikwuemesi =

Nigerian footballer (born 2001)

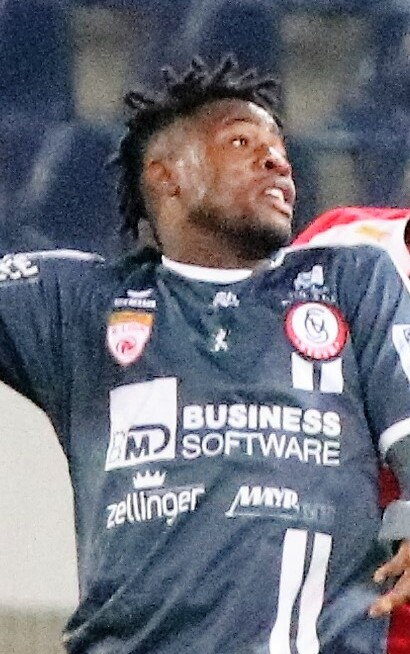
- Ikwuemesi with Vorwärts Steyr in 2021

Personal information
- Full name: Charles Chukwubuikem Ikwuemesi
- Date of birth: 5 August 2001 (age 25)
- Place of birth: Lagos, Nigeria
- Height: 1.95 m (6 ft 5 in)
- Position: Forward

Team information
- Current team: Oud-Heverlee Leuven
- Number: 19

Youth career
- Olive Charles Academy
- 2020–2021: Giant Brillars

Senior career*
Years	Team	Apps	(Gls)
2021–2022	Giant Brillars	0	(0)
2021	→ Vorwärts Steyr (loan)	8	(1)
2022	Krško	11	(4)
2022–2023	Celje	32	(10)
2023–2024	Salernitana	25	(1)
2024–	OH Leuven	71	(10)

International career^{‡}
2020	Nigeria U20	3	(0)
- * Club domestic league appearances and goals as of 1 June 2026 ‡ National team caps and goals as of 8 September 2023

Charles Chukwubuikem Ikwuemesi (born 5 August 2001) is a Nigerian professional footballer who plays as a forward for Belgian Pro League club OH Leuven.

== Club career ==
Ikwuemesi is a youth product of the Nigerian clubs Olive Charles Academy and Giant Brillars. He began his senior career on loan with the Austrian 2. Liga club Vorwärts Steyr on 31 August 2021. On 31 December 2021, his loan with Vorwärts Steyr was terminated due to financial problems. After a short return to Nigeria, he moved to the Slovenian Second League club Krško, where he scored 4 goals in 11 league appearances. On 2 July 2022, he signed with the Slovenian PrvaLiga side Celje on a 3 years contract. On 18 August 2023, he transferred to the Italian Serie A club Salernitana on a contract until 2027.

== International career ==
Ikwuemesi is a youth international for Nigeria, having been called up to the Nigeria U20s in 2020 for the WAFU B Cup of Nations tournament.
