= 1980 in association football =

The following are the association football events of the year 1980 throughout the world.

== Events ==
- Copa Libertadores 1980: Won by Nacional after defeating Sport Club Internacional on an aggregate score of 2–0.
- England: 1980 FA Cup Final: West Ham United 1, Arsenal 0, the winning goal scored by Trevor Brooking
- European Cup 1980: Won by Nottingham Forest after defeating Hamburger SV 1–0 in the Final.
- Scottish Cup final: Celtic beat Rangers 1-0 after extra time at Hampden Park. After the match there is a pitch invasion, leading to rioting and 210 arrests. Following the match the sale of alcohol at Scottish football grounds is banned.
- September 10 – Midfielder Jan van Deinsen plays his first and only international match for the Netherlands, when the Netherlands meets the Republic of Ireland in Dublin.
- September 17 – Dutch side FC Utrecht makes its European debut with a draw (0-0) in Romania against FC Argeș Pitești in the first round of the UEFA Cup.

== Winners club national championship ==
=== Asia ===
- Qatar: Al-Sadd SC

=== Europe ===
- Belgium: Club Brugge K.V.
- England: Liverpool
- France: FC Nantes
- Italy: Inter Milan
- Netherlands: Ajax Amsterdam
- Portugal: Sporting CP
- Scotland: Aberdeen
- Soviet Union: Spartak Moscow
- Spain: Real Madrid
- Turkey: Trabzonspor
- West Germany: Bayern Munich
- Yugoslavia: Red Star Belgrade

=== North America ===
- Mexico: Cruz Azul
- United States / Canada:
  - New York Cosmos (NASL)

=== Oceania ===
- Australia: Sydney City

=== South America ===
- Argentina
  - Metropolitano – River Plate
  - Nacional – Rosario Central
- Brazil: Flamengo
- Bolivia: Jorge Wilstermann
- Colombia: Atlético Junior
- Paraguay Paraguay: Olimpia Asunción

== International Tournaments ==
- African Cup of Nations in Nigeria (March 8 – 22 1980)
  1. Nigeria
  2. Algeria
  3. Morocco
- 1980 British Home Championship (May 16 – May 24, 1980)

Northern Ireland

- UEFA European Football Championship in Italy (June 11 – 22 1980)
  1. West Germany
  2. Belgium
  3. Italy and Czechoslovakia
- Olympic Games in Moscow, Soviet Union (July 20 – August 2, 1980)
  1. Czechoslovakia
  2. East Germany
  3. Soviet Union
- Mundialito in Montevideo, Uruguay (December 30, 1980 – January 10, 1981)
  1. Uruguay
  2. Brazil
  3. —

== National Teams ==
=== Netherlands ===
Date	Opponent	Final score	Result	Competition	Venue
January 23	Spain	1 – 0	L	Friendly	Estadio Balaídos, Vigo
March 26	France	0 – 0	D	Friendly	Parc des Princes, Paris
June 11	Greece	1 – 0	W	Euro 1980	Stadio San Paolo, Naples
June 14	West Germany	2 – 3	L	Euro 1980	Stadio San Paolo, Naples
June 17	Czechoslovakia	1 – 1	D	Euro 1980	San Siro, Milan
September 10	Republic of Ireland	2 – 1	L	World Cup Qualifier	Lansdowne Road, Dublin
October 11	West Germany	1 – 1	D	Friendly	Philips Stadion, Eindhoven
November 19	Belgium	1 – 0	L	World Cup Qualifier	Heysel Stadion, Brussels
December 30	Uruguay	2 – 0	L	Mundialito	Estadio Centenario, Montevideo

== Births ==
- January 6 – Steed Malbranque, Belgian-French footballer
- January 12 – Michael Niedrig, German former footballer
- January 14 – Ossama Haidar, Lebanese international
- January 22 – Ibón Larrazábal, Spanish retired footballer
- January 25 – Xavi, Spanish footballer
- February 1
  - Moisés Muñoz, Mexican footballer
  - Otilino Tenorio, Ecuadorian footballer (d. 2005)
- February 6 – Shaun Hadley, English former professional footballer
- February 9 – Jean-Reck Ah Fok, Mauritian footballer
- February 15 – Elvis Marecos, Paraguayan footballer
- February 20
  - Artur Boruc, Polish footballer
  - Thijs Sluijter, Dutch footballer
- February 28 – Piotr Giza, Polish footballer
- March 4 – Omar Bravo, Mexican footballer
- March 8 – Aridani Arbelo, Spanish footballer
- March 13 – Dani Ferron, Andorran footballer
- March 14 – Aaron Brown, English footballer
- March 15 – Hugo Notario, Argentine footballer
- March 20 – Thomas Levaux, French professional footballer
- March 21
  - John McGrath, Irish footballer
  - Ronaldinho, Brazilian footballer
- March 31
  - Matias Concha, Swedish footballer
  - Dean Clark, English footballer
- April 3 – Marcin Makuch, Polish footballer
- April 7 – Jérémie Peiffer, Luxembourgian footballer
- April 17 – Leonid Lazaridi, former Russian footballer
- April 22 – Nicolas Douchez, French footballer
- May 5 – Youssou Diop, Senegalese retired footballer
- May 14 – Zdeněk Grygera, Czech footballer
- May 18 – Diego Pérez, Uruguayan footballer
- May 30 – Steven Gerrard, English footballer
- June 2 – Abby Wambach, American women's soccer player
- June 10
  - Edgard Lima, Brazilian footballer
  - Francelino Matuzalem, Brazilian footballer
- June 12
  - Ifet Taljević, Yugoslav-born German club footballer
  - Mohammed Usman, Nigerian footballer
- June 26 – Michael Jackson, English club footballer
- June 30
  - Rade Prica, Swedish international
  - Sayuti, Indonesian club footballer
- July 8 – Robbie Keane, Irish footballer
- August 5 – Wayne Bridge, English footballer
- August 6
  - Danny Collins, English-Welsh footballer
  - Roman Weidenfeller, German footballer
- August 7 – Shane Moody-Orio, Belizean footballer
- August 12 – Javier Chevantón, Uruguayan footballer
- August 22 – Gabriel Chade, Argentine football assistant referee
- September 6
  - Sergei Sholokhov, former Russian professional footballer
  - Joseph Yobo, Nigerian footballer
- September 7 – Zakhele Manyatsi, Swaziland international footballer
- September 9 – Steeve Theophile, French footballer
- September 10 – Willy Eras, Costa Rican professional footballer
- September 17 – Mikhail Nekrasov, former Russian professional footballer
- September 18 – Marco Antonio Mendoza, Mexican footballer
- September 29 – Patrick Agyemang, Ghanaian international
- October 3 – Dalibor Mitrović, Serbian footballer
- October 4 – Tomáš Rosický, Czech international
- October 5 – Lartee Jackson, Liberian former footballer
- October 9
  - Kert Kütt, Estonian footballer
  - Amir Nussbaum, Israeli footballer
  - Ibrahim Fazeel, Maldivian footballer
  - Fábio Pinto, Brazilian footballer
  - Warren Waugh, English footballer
- October 23 – Scott Parker, English international
- October 27 – Radhakrishnan Dhanarajan, Indian club footballer (d. 2019)
- October 28 – Alan Smith, English international
- October 29 – Arthur (Arthur Teixeira Viégas), Brazilian footballer
- November 2 – Diego Lugano, Uruguayan footballer
- November 3 – Bernard Morreel, Belgian retired footballer
- November 4 – Tuda Murphy, Caymanian footballer
- November 5 – Christoph Metzelder, German international
- November 18 – Luke Chadwick, English youth international
- November 22 – David Artell, English club footballer and manager
- November 26 – Sergei Viktorovich Kudryavtsev, former Russian professional footballer
- December 6 – Steve Lovell, English club footballer
- December 7 – John Terry, English footballer
- December 20 – Ashley Cole, English footballer
- December 27 – Mladen Žižović, Bosnian football player and manager (d. 2025)
- December 31 – Beto Gonçalves, Brazilian-born Indonesian international

== Deaths ==
=== February ===
- February 22 – Pierre Korb, French international footballer (born 1908)

=== March ===
- March 1 – Dixie Dean, English international footballer (born 1907)

=== June ===
- June 8 – Alfredo Brilhante da Costa, Brazilian international defender, Brazilian squad member at the 1930 FIFA World Cup. (75)
- June 9 – Miguel Capuccini, Uruguayan goalkeeper, winner of the 1930 FIFA World Cup. (76)

=== September ===
- September 9 – José de Anchieta Fontana, Brazilian international defender, winner of the 1970 FIFA World Cup. (39)
