= The Vinyl Factory =

British music company

- Industry: Record label; Pressing plant; Music venue; Record store; Magazine publisher
- Headquarters: 16-18 Marshall Street, London, United Kingdom
- Website: thevinylfactory.com

The Vinyl Factory is a British music company based in London, England. It includes a record label, vinyl pressing plant, and a venue space. It also publishes Fact magazine and owns Phonica Records store.

== Overview ==
The Vinyl Factory began as a pressing plant in 2001 after purchasing the manufacturing equipment from EMI. For two years, they completed orders left over from EMI's company, which helped keep and maintain a loyal customer base. In 2008, Vinyl Factory expanded into a record label.

== Commissions & exhibitions ==
The Vinyl Factory has curated exhibitions and events at three spaces in London, The Vinyl Factory Soho, Brewer Street Car Park and Store Studios, 180 The Strand. Recent audio-visual shows presented by Store X The Vinyl Factory have included The Infinite Mix (2016), in partnership with Hayward Gallery; Everything At Once (2017) in partnership with Lisson Gallery and Arthur Jafa's Love is the Message, the Message is Death (2017), in partnership with the Serpentine Galleries. Previously, The Vinyl Factory has presented solo exhibitions by Ragnar Kjartansson, Ryoji Ikeda, Carsten Nicolai and Richard Mosse, and group exhibitions with Lazarides,^{[8]} and The Moving Museum as well as celebrations of the vinyl aesthetic of Kraftwerk, David Bowie and Punk. In 2013 The Vinyl Factory also partnered with the British Council to host the opening party for Jeremy Deller at the Venice Biennale^{[9]} and presented Dinos Chapman's first live music show at Sónar and subsequently during Frieze Art Fair in London.

In 2017, The Vinyl Factory initiated VF Commissions, a new venture producing and collaborating with artists to create new site specific works. The first of these were Kahlil Joseph's Fly Paper, which opened at the New Museum in New York in September 2017, and Ryoji Ikeda's test pattern (no.12) which premiered at Store Studios, 180 The Strand, from October to December 2017, attracting over 100,000 visitors.
