= Tom De Cock (football manager) =

Belgian football coach and former player

Personal information
- Date of birth: 12 October 1973 (age 53)

Team information
- Current team: Wetteren (manager)

Managerial career
- Years: Team
- 2007–2008: OH Leuven (assistant)
- 2008: OH Leuven (caretaker manager)
- 2008–2010: OH Leuven (assistant)
- 2010–2012: Woluwe-Zaventem
- 2012: Union SG
- 2013: Union SG
- 2013–2016: Overijse
- 2016–2018: Aalst
- 2019–2021: Dikkelvenne
- 2021–2024: Lebbeke
- 2024–: Wetteren

Tom De Cock (born 12 October 1973) is a Belgian football coach. After managing the youth ranks at OH Leuven, De Cock started as assistant manager for the A-squad of OH Leuven in the Belgian Second Division under Rudi Cossey in 2007, even taking over as caretaker manager for a brief period in 2008, between the sudden resignation of Cossey and the appointment of Marc Wuyts. Later he moved to Woluwe-Zaventem, to become head coach, followed by several other teams mainly at the second, third and fourth level of Belgian football. Currently, he is the manager of Wetteren in the Belgian Division 2.

Main successes of De Cock include promotions with Overijse (in 2015) and Aalst (in 2017).
