= Lazaridis =

Lazaridis is a surname. Notable people with the surname include:

- George-Emmanuel Lazaridis (born 1978), Greek classical pianist, composer and mentor
- Georgios Lazaridis (born 1983), Greek footballer
- Kostas Lazaridis (1900–1943), Greek trade unionist and politician
- Mike Lazaridis (born 1961), Canadian businessman
- Nico Lazaridis (born 1952), German footballer
- Nikolaos Lazaridis (born 1979), Greek footballer
- Prokopios Lazaridis (1859–1923), Greek Orthodox metropolitan bishop and saint
- Stan Lazaridis (born 1972), Australian soccer player
- Stefanos Lazaridis (1942–2010), British stage designer

== See also ==
- 14428 Lazaridis, minor planet
- Acacia lazaridis, species
- Lazarides, surname
- Leonid Lazaridi (born 1980), Russian footballer
- Melaleuca lazaridis, species
