= Bernard Morreel =

Belgian footballer

Personal information
- Date of birth: 3 November 1980 (age 45)
- Place of birth: Belgium
- Height: 1.85 m (6 ft 1 in)
- Position: Defensive midfielder

Senior career*
Years	Team	Apps	(Gls)
1997–2001	Stade Leuven	78	(3)
2001–2002	ZD Oud-Heverlee	28	(2)
2002–2003	Lommel SK	16	(0)
2003	→ OH Leuven (loan)	5	(1)
2003–2004	KV Mechelen	24	(0)
2004–2006	OH Leuven	54	(0)
2006–2008	Tienen	55	(3)
2008–2009	Londerzeel	25	(1)
2009–2013	Wijgmaal	108	(3)
2013–2014	Diest		
2014–2015	Houtvenne		
- * Club domestic league appearances and goals

Bernard Morreel (born 3 November 1980) is a Belgian retired footballer.

== Club career ==
Morreel started his senior career in Leuven, playing for Stade Leuven and Zwarte Duivels Oud-Heverlee. After a short passage with Lommel SK in the Belgian Pro League, where he played 16 matches, Morreel was loaned out to OH Leuven in the Belgian Third Division. Morreel then moved to Mechelen (also third tier) before rejoining OH Leuven, a team with which he enjoyed promotion to the Belgian Second Division. OH Leuven rivals Tienen were his next employers, before moving to the fourth tier with teams as Londerzeel, Wijgmaal, and Diest.
