= Arbelo =

Arbelo is a Spanish surname. Notable people with the surname include:

- Aridani Arbelo (born 1980), Spanish footballer
- Diego Arbelo (born 1994), Uruguayan rugby union player
- Rosana Arbelo (born 1963), Spanish singer and songwriter
