= Tuda =

Tuda may refer to

- Tuda of Lindisfarne, 7th-century bishop of Lindisfarne, England
- Tuda Murphy (born 1980), Caymanian footballer
- Olmeta-di-Tuda, a commune in the Haute-Corse department of France
