= Mohammed Usman =

Mohammed Usman may refer to:

- Mohammed Usman (general), Nigerian general
- Mohammed Usman (footballer, born 1980), Nigerian footballer for Kwara United F.C.
- Mohammed Usman (footballer, born 1994), Nigerian footballer for Sarpsborg 08
- Mohammed Usman (fighter), Nigerian heavyweight MMA fighter, winner of The Ultimate Fighter: Team Peña vs. Team Nunes
- Muhammed Usman Edu (born 1994), Nigerian footballer

== See also ==
- Mohammad Usman (disambiguation)
