= Aiyawatt Srivaddhanaprabha =

Thai businessman (born 1985)

Aiyawatt Srivaddhanaprabha DM
- อัยยวัฒน์ ศรีวัฒนประภา
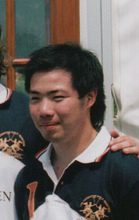
- Aiyawatt in 2006
- Born: Aiyawatt Raksriaksorn; 26 July 1985 (age 41); Bangkok, Thailand
- Education: Bangkok University; Saint Gabriel's College
- Occupation: Businessman
- Title: CEO and chairman, King Power; Chairman, Leicester City; Chairman, OH Leuven
- Parent(s): Vichai Srivaddhanaprabha; Aimon Srivaddhanaprabha
- Sports career
- Country: Thailand
- Sport: Polo
Medal record
Polo
Representing Thailand
Southeast Asian Games
Gold medal – first place	2025 Thailand	Mixed 2-4 Goals
Silver medal – second place	2017 Kuala Lumpur	Team

Aiyawatt "Top" Srivaddhanaprabha (Thai: อัยยวัฒน์ ศรีวัฒนประภา; born Aiyawatt Raksriaksorn [อัยยวัฒน์ รักศรีอักษร] on 26 July 1985) is a Thai businessman, the CEO and chairman of King Power, and the chairman of Leicester City and OH Leuven. On Forbes' 2020 World’s Billionaires List, he was one of the five youngest billionaires in Asia.

== Education ==
Aiyawatt was educated at Saint Gabriel's College, one of the Montfort Brothers of St. Gabriel colleges, and earned a bachelor of business administration degree from the Bangkok University International Program.

== Business career ==
Aiyawatt Srivaddhanaprabha is the CEO and Chairman of King Power, which was owned by his late father Vichai Srivaddhanaprabha. He has also had senior executive and administrative capacities at numerous associated companies.

He is the chairman of EFL League One football club Leicester City, of which his late father had been the owner and chairman from 2010 to his death in 2018. After the death of his father he became the chairman.

For his work in business and contribution to the community in the City of Leicester, he was awarded an honorary doctorate by De Montfort University in 2014.

== Sports career ==
Srivaddhanaprabha is a polo player. He was encouraged by his father Vichai Srivaddhanaprabha who is also the founder the Thai Polo Association to take up the sport at age 18. His older brother Apichet is also a polo player.

Aiyawatt represents Thailand in international competitions. This includes the SEA Games. Aiyawatt and Apichet won a silver medal for Thailand in the 2017 edition in Malaysia. The brothers will return in the 2025 SEA Games.

== Personal life ==
Srivaddhanaprabha is a Buddhist, and was ordained as a monk at the Thepsirin Buddhist Temple in Bangkok for a month in 2015.

Aiyawatt's grandfather, Wiwat Raksriaksorn (Chinese: 徐利明; pinyin: Xú Lìmíng) traces his roots at Zhao'an, Fujian, China. Aiyawat's father Vichai Srivaddhanaprabha was the founder of King Power. He has three elder siblings, brother Apichet and sisters Voramas and Aroonroong. His Chinese name is Xu Chengyuan (徐盛源; Xú Chéngyuán).

On 27 October 2018, his father died in a helicopter crash outside the King Power Stadium following Leicester City's home match against West Ham United. Aiyawatt had not attended the match. The next day, he flew to Leicester to pay tribute to his father.
