= Michel Baulier =

French footballer (born 1949)

Personal information
- Date of birth: 20 June 1949 (age 77)
- Place of birth: Valdahon (Doubs), France
- Position: Defender

Senior career*
Years	Team	Apps	(Gls)
1969–1971	Baumes-les-Dames		
1971–1975	FC Metz	117	(1)
1975–1979	Olympique Marseille	136	(1)
1979–1980	Sochaux		
1980–1981	Gap		

Managerial career
- 1980–1981: Gap FC
- * Club domestic league appearances and goals

Michel Baulier (born 20 June 1949 in Valdahon (Doubs)), is a retired French footballer.

A defender primarily for FC Metz and Olympique Marseille, he was also a player-coach at Gap FC between 1980 and 1981.
