= Wuyts =

Wuyts is a Dutch patronymic surname, most common in the province of the Belgian Antwerp, where Wuyt was a local short form of Wouter. People with this name include:

- Bart Wuyts (born 1969), Belgian tennis player
- Gustaaf Wuyts (1903–1979), Belgian tug of war competitor, shot putter and discus thrower
- Jules Wuyts (1886–?), Belgian swimmer
- Marc Wuyts (born 1967), Belgian football forward and coach
- Peter Wuyts (born 1973), Belgian racing cyclist
