= Makuch =

Makuch, Makúch, or Makukh are surnames. Makuch and alternatives may refer to:

- Dirk Schulze-Makuch (born 1964), American astrobiologist
- Jozef Makúch (born 1953), former governor of the National Bank of Slovakia
- Marcin Makuch (born 1980), Polish footballer
- Patryk Makuch (born 1999), Polish footballer
- Vasyl Makukh (1927–1968), Ukrainian activist
- Wanda Makuch-Korulska (1919–2007), Polish neurologist

== See also ==
- Macúch, an unrelated surname
