= Hooger Op FC Leuven =

Belgian football club

- Full name: Hooger Op Football Club Leuven
- Founded: 23 January 1924; 101 years ago (founded)
- Dissolved: 16 February 1949; 76 years ago (merged into Daring Club Leuven)
- League: 1946–47 Belgian First Provincial Division

Hooger Op FC Leuven, was a Belgian football club from the city of Leuven, Flemish Brabant that existed between 1924 and 1949, when it ceased to exist and merged into Daring Club Leuven.

== History ==
The club was founded towards the end of 1923 and officially registered on 23 January 1924 with the Belgian FA. At that point in time, three other teams were already active in Leuven, namely Stade Leuven, Victoria FC Louvain and SC Louvain. Hooger Op started at the Third Provincial Division and would gradually start rising through the divisions, reaching the Belgian Third Division in 1933, at that time the lowest national level of football, where it met Victoria FC Louvain.

Hooger Op immediately relegated back into the provincial divisions but was able to return three seasons later, in 1937. This time they were paired with SC Louvain, but again immediately relegated back, never to return at the national level.

Shortly after World War II, Hooger Op merged with athletics club Olympic, which was suffering from financial difficulties and from that point continued as Hooger Op Leuven Athletics Club. The club last competed in the 1946–47 Belgian First Provincial Division, finishing 13th. In the meantime, SC Louvain and Victoria FC Louvain had merged into Daring Club Leuven and in 1949 Hooger Op merged into this team as well, ceasing to exist. The athletics club also changed name, becoming Daring Club Leuven Atletiek.

== Honours ==
- First Provincial Division:
  - Winners (1): 1928–29
- Third Provincial Division:
  - Winners (1): 1936–37
