= King Power =

Thai duty-free shop

King Power International Group
- Industry: Duty-free shop
- Founded: 1989 (37 years ago)
- Founder: Vichai Srivaddhanaprabha
- Headquarters: 8 King Power Complex, Rangnam Road, Phaya Thai, Ratchathewi, Bangkok 10400 Thailand
- Area served: Thailand
- Key people: Aiyawatt Srivaddhanaprabha (Chairman & CEO)
- Revenue: ▲€876 million (2022)
- Number of employees: 7,000
- Subsidiaries: Leicester City; Oud-Heverlee Leuven
- Website: www.kingpower.com www.kingpoweronline.com

The King Power International Group (Thai: กลุ่มบริษัท คิง เพาเวอร์ อินเตอร์เนชันแนล) is a Thai travel retail group, based in Bangkok. The chairman and CEO was Vichai Srivaddhanaprabha until his death in October 2018. He was succeeded as chairman by his son, Aiyawatt.

King Power's cash cow is the proprietary concession of Thailand's duty-free business." The company is the largest duty-free retailer in Thailand. Its duty free shopping mall in Bangkok's central business district covers over 12,000 square metres (130,000 sq ft) and it has branches at Suvarnabhumi Airport and Thailand's other major airports. In 2015, King Power launched an online site selling duty-free and duty-paid items.

== History ==
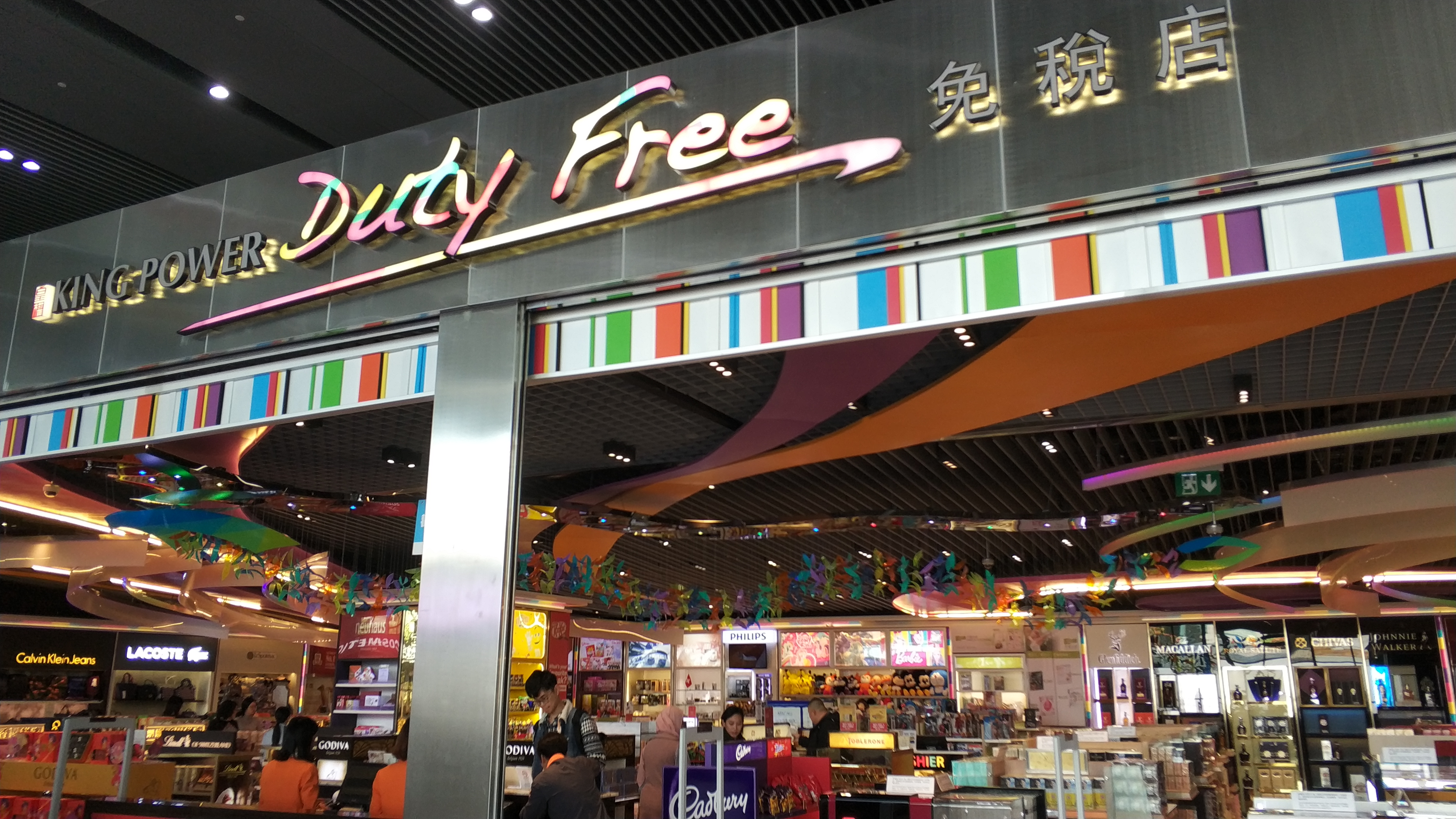
A King Power duty-free shop at Macau International Airport.

King Power began in 1989, with a license granted for Thailand's first downtown duty-free shop at Mahatun Plaza. In 1995, King Power won the sole concession to operate duty-free shops at Don Mueang Airport, then Bangkok's main airport. In 1997, the government of Prime Minister Chavalit Yongchaiyudh granted the company the sole right to manage duty-free business at the World Trade Centre in downtown Bangkok for 10 years. The business had previously been managed by the Tourism Authority of Thailand. Some questioned whether it was contrary to Prime Minister's Office regulations regarding partnership with private business.

In 2004, the government of Thaksin Shinawatra granted King Power the right to operate duty-free shops at Suvarnabhumi, Bangkok's new main airport, for 10 years. Shortly thereafter, the company won the concession to operate duty-free shops at four major provincial airports until 2015. There was no bidding for the concessions. As of 2016 King Power operated branches at Suvarnabhumi, Don Mueang, Phuket, Chiang Mai, and Hat Yai airports. King Power's monopoly status stands in sharp contrast to the practice at other comparable international airports. For example, Incheon International Airport has twelve duty-free concessions competing for trade.

King Power received the royal warrant from the King of Thailand in December 2009. The garuda statue in front of its headquarters symbolizes that privilege.

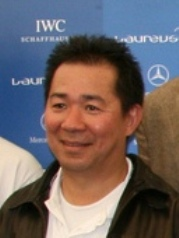
King Power founder Vichai Srivaddhanaprabha

In August 2010, following agreement on a three-year shirt sponsorship deal with King Power, Milan Mandarić sold the English football club Leicester City F.C. to a Thai-led consortium called Asian Football Investments (AFI), owned by King Power Group's Vichai Srivaddhanaprabha. On 16 May 2017, Belgian First Division B team Oud-Heverlee Leuven announced that they had accepted an offer from King Power to buy the club.

In 2011, it opened the first regional store in Thailand's eastern region, opening the King Power complex in Pattaya. The following year, the business gained a new duty-free store at Don Mueang airport. Then in 2014, King Power gained an in-flight duty free concession from Thai AirAsia X and opened the first Leicester City fan store at BTS Siam Station.

In June 2016 King Power purchased a US$226 million stake in Thai AirAsia, the country's largest budget airline. The purchase of 39 percent of holding company Asia Aviation makes King Power the second largest shareholder in Thai AirAsia.

On 27 October 2018, the chairman and CEO of King Power, Vichai Srivaddhanaprabha, died in a helicopter crash, shortly after leaving King Power Stadium, home of Leicester City FC. An investigation into the crash by the United Kingdom's Air Accident Investigation Branch found that it was caused by mechanical failure.

== Stores ==
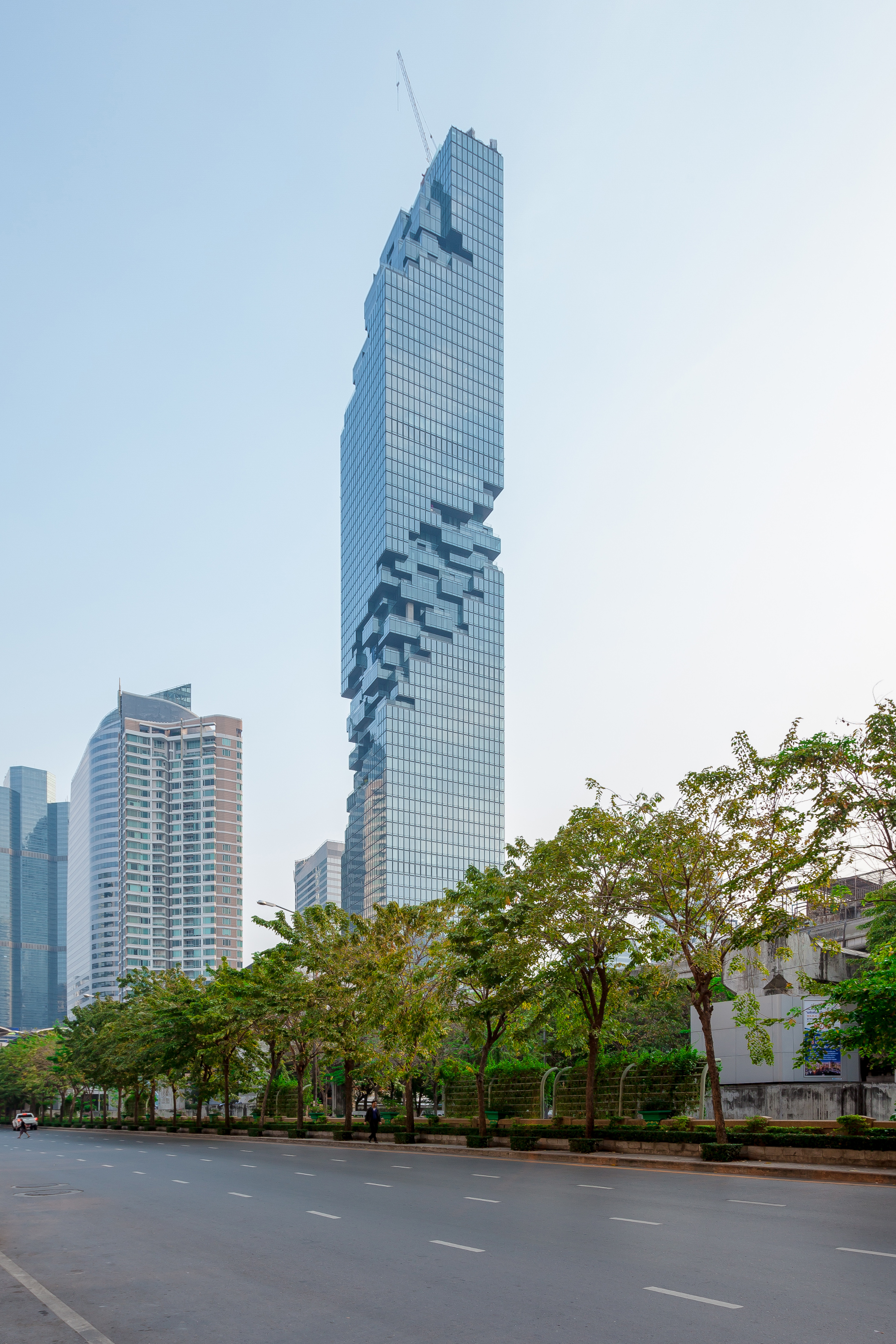
The King Power MahaNakhon skyscraper in Bangkok

King Power has outlets at nine Thai airports and stores in major tourist venues.

== Allegation of wrongdoing ==
In 2017, King Power was accused of failing to pay the Thai state 14 billion baht (£327 million) from the operation of their airport duty-free shop monopoly. The original agreement, signed in 2006, requires that 15 percent of duty-free shop income be paid to the Thai government. The lawsuit alleges that King Power colluded with airport employees to pay the government only a three percent slice of duty free takings. The lawsuit was filed by a deputy chairman of a government anti-corruption subcommittee. Two other King Power group companies owned by the Srivaddhanaprabha family were also accused of corruption in the legal action, along with a senior King Power executive. Fourteen officials working for Airports of Thailand PCL (AOT) have also been named in the suit. King Power immediately dismissed allegations of corruption relating to its contract with state-owned AOT. The allegations were described as "absolutely untrue" by Dr. Nitinai Sirismatthakarn, President of AoT, who explained the allegations were based on a misunderstanding of contract modifications negotiated by AoT. In effect, fee percentage was effectively reduced, but there is a lack of understanding of this modification in the contracts as rate does not apply to the same calculation structure. Instead of charging 15 percent of profit, AoT receives three percent of turnover, resulting in increased fees received by AoT (seven times previous fees). "This absolutely cannot be considered as damage to the state", Dr. Nitinai said. The Central Criminal Court for Corruption and Misconduct Cases in Bangkok accepted the case in November 2017, and said it would begin to hear witnesses on 12 February 2018. In August 2018, the court said it would extend a hearing into accusations of graft against AOT and King Power, delaying a decision on whether to take up the case. The court will hold another hearing on 4 September 2018, summoning the AOT president to clarify the AOT's duties, revenues, and regulations governing commercial activity. The Central Criminal Court for Corruption and Misconduct Cases dismissed the case on 18 September 2018, ruling that the plaintiff "was not an affected party, therefore he cannot sue in this case."

== Close ties to various Thai governments ==
King Power's "cash cow" is its duty-free business which operates as a government-sanctioned monopoly. Over the years, King Power has been very close to the Thaksin, Abhisit, and Yingluck governments. It has also been a supporter of post-coup governments of Sonthi Boonyaratglin and more recently, Prayut Chan-o-cha.

In January 2019, it was revealed that King Power was among the donors at the pro-junta Phalang Pracharat Party's 600 million baht dinner fundraiser.

== Philanthropy ==
=== Football in Thailand ===
==== 2017–2022 ====
100 football pitch & 1 million footballs

King Power's aims to promote Thai youth's football potentiality in a comprehensive manner ranging from donate 1 million footballs to youth across Thailand, to installing an international-standard artificial grass football pitch for 100 schools and communities across Thailand within 5 years. The country's leading duty-free retailer has launched a countrywide campaign called “Sport Power” that aims to develop football skills of the children.

Fox Hunt project

King Power has been continuously contributing to Thai football with the Fox Hunt project, which gives scholarships to talented youngsters who are trained at the Leicester Football Academy in England. Other King Power football programmes include Leicester City Football Clinic and King Power Cup.

Muak Lek National training centre

In November 2019, Aiyawatt Srivaddhanaprabha have agreed to fund a new training centre for the Football Association of Thailand (FAT). King Power will cover 100 per cent of the building costs, estimated at 500 million baht. The training centre will be built on a 192,000 square-metre site in the Muak Lek District of Thailand's Saraburi province. The plans are part of the country's 20-year football development 'master plan' of the FAT. The 20-year master plan is to build national training centres across every region of Thailand (Southern, Northern, Northeastern, Central, Eastern and Western).

=== King Power Thai Power ===
A corporate social responsibility project, King Power Thai Power was launched to "inspire Thais to go further and achieve international success in various aspects, from sports to music and community". The project is focused on sport, music, community and education & health.

== See also ==
- List of duty-free shops
