= Kocherga =

Kocherga (Russian: Кочерга, Ukrainian: Кочерга, meaning fire iron) is a gender-neutral Slavic surname. Notable people with the surname include:

- Anatoly Kocherga (born 1947), Ukrainian opera singer
- Sergei Sholokhov (born Kocherga in 1980), Russian football player
