= Sergei Kudryavtsev =

Sergei Kudryavtsev may refer to:

- Sergei Kudryavtsev (politician) (1903–1938), Ukrainian communist Soviet politician
- Sergei Kudryavtsev (diplomat) (1915–1998), Soviet intelligence officer and Soviet Ambassador to Cuba
- Sergey Kudryavtsev (born 1956), Russian film critic and historian
- Sergei Kudryavtsev (footballer) (born 1980), Russian footballer
