= Victoria FC Louvain =

Belgian football club

- Full name: Victoria Football Club Louvain
- Founded: 26 May 1920; 105 years ago (founded)
- Dissolved: 16 August 1945; 80 years ago (merged into Daring Club Leuven)
- League: 1942–43 Belgian Second Provincial Division

Victoria FC Louvain, was a Belgian football club from the city of Leuven, Flemish Brabant that existed between 1920 and 1945, when it ceased to exist and unofficially merged into Daring Club Leuven.

== History ==
The club was founded and joined the Belgian FA on 26 May 1920, starting in the Second Provincial Division. In 1926, the club reached the national level for the first time, entering the Belgian Third Division, where it was paired with city rivals Stade Leuven and from 1928 as well with SC Leuven. Together with SC Leuven, Victoria dropped back into the provincial leagues following the 1928–29 season.

In 1933 Victoria again returned to the Third Division, now meeting another team from Leuven with Hooger Op FC Leuven. Victoria avoided relegation successfully and was awarded by again being paired with Stade Leuven and SC Leuven the following season. After four seasons of national football, Victoria relegated again in 1937 and would never return. The club relegated into the Belgian Second Provincial Division in 1939 and further into the Belgian Third Provincial Division in 1943. After World War II, several clubs from Leuven merged, with Victoria ceasing to exist and unofficially merging with SC Louvain, which continued as Daring Club Leuven. The club was finally officially disestablished on 16 augustus 1945.

== Honours ==
- Second Provincial Division:
  - Winners (1): 1929–30
