= Jumana Manna =

American-born Palestinian artist (born 1987)

- جمانة مناع
- Manna at Tabakalera in 2021
- Born: 1987 (age 38–39); Princeton, New Jersey, U.S.
- Education: Oslo National Academy of the Arts, California Institute of the Arts
- Occupation: Visual artist
- Known for: Installation art, film

Jumana Manna (Arabic: جمانة مناع; born 1987) is a Palestinian visual artist. Born in the United States, she lived in Jerusalem and Oslo and now resides in Berlin. She holds U.S. and Israeli citizenship.

A multidisciplinary visual artist, Manna works in multiple mediums, including installation art and film. Manna has produced work featured at the Museum of Modern Art, MoMA PS1, The Moving Museum, the Museum van Hedendaagse Kunst Antwerpen, and the Wexner Center for the Arts.

== Early life and education ==
Manna was born in 1987, in Princeton, New Jersey, United States. She received a Bachelor of Arts degree from the Oslo National Academy of the Arts and a Master of Arts degree in aesthetics and politics at the California Institute of the Arts.

== Career ==
Manna's work explores the effects of preservation practices in the fields of agriculture, science and law.

Manna's 2015 film A Magical Substance Flows Into Me focuses on Robert Lachmann's quest to create an archive of "oriental music" in Jerusalem. The Museum of Modern Art screened A Magical Substance Flows Into Me in 2022.

In 2017, Manna released her second film, Wild Relatives, which focused on the Svalbard Global Seed Vault in Norway and its relationship with the International Center for Agricultural Research in the Dry Areas (ICARDA) and ICARDA's stored seeds from the Lebanon’s Bekaa Valley amidst the backdrop of the Syrian Revolution.

In 2021, her exhibition “Thirty Plumbers in the Belly" was on display at the Museum van Hedendaagse Kunst Antwerpen.

In 2022, Manna's film Foragers was featured in the Toronto Biennial of Art exhibition “What Water Knows, the Land Remembers.” Foragers examines how Israel's declaration that za'atar and akkoub are protected species impacted Palestinians.

From September 2022 to August 2023, Manna had her first major American museum exhibition titled "Break, Take, Erase, Tally," at MoMA PS1. The exhibition was then brought to be displayed at the Wexner Center for the Arts.

In 2024, Manna exhibited her film Foragers at the National Museum of Modern and Contemporary Art in Seoul, South Korea.

In 2026, there was controversy around a work she was commissioned by the Norwegian government as part of the rebuilding of the government quarters after the bombing of 2011, where she intended to dedicate the artwork to the Palestinian struggle.
