= George-Emmanuel Lazaridis =

Greek classical pianist and composer (born 1978)

- Origin: Thessaloniki, Greece
- Genre: Classical
- Occupation: Pianist and Composer
- Years active: 1984-present
- Website: http://www.lazaridismusic.com

George-Emmanuel Lazaridis (born 1978, Thessaloniki, Greece) is a Greek classical pianist, composer and mentor.

== Biography ==
=== Early life ===
Born in Greece, Lazaridis started composing at the age of four. At the age of six, he began to attract public attention, appearing in various TV art programs and a special 45-minute radio broadcast on the Greek National Radio.

Mentored by Yonty Solomon at the Royal College of Music in London, Lazaridis also worked with Alfred Brendel, Ruth Nye, Domna Evnouhidou, Paul Badura-Skoda, Noretta Conci Leech and Douglas Finch. Since the age of eleven, he has received prizes, honorary awards like the Jeunes Solistes D' Europe and the Steinway & Sons Grand Prix, scholarships from the Hattori, Onasis and Levendis Foundations, the RCM Queen Elizabeth the Queen Mother award and the Chappell Medal 2000. He has also received a TCM Fellowship, medals from the prestigious Academy of Athens, the Worshipful Company of Musicians and many more.

=== Solo performance and composition career ===
Lazaridis has performed at Royal Albert Hall, Barbican, Carnegie Hall, Concertgebouw, St Petersburg Philharmonia Hall, Palais des Beaux Arts, Festspielhaus, Cologne's Philharmonie, Stockholm's Konserthuset, Cite de la Musique in Paris, Vienna's Konzerthaus and Musikverein, Athens Megaron, Birmingham's Symphony Hall and Palace of the Arts in Budapest.

To date he has received commissions from the Greek Ministry of Culture, Europa Cantat International Festival, The Cultural Capital of Europe 1997, Melina Merkouri Foundation, New Arts Generation Festival in Birmingham, Athens International Festival, and Athens State Orchestra.

His work, "Sleepwalking", performed at London's Wigmore Hall was nominated for a Sony Award. And his new rhapsodic song-cycle 'Tragic Love', written for the singer Maria Farandouri, received its world premier at the Ancient Epidaurus Theatre in July 2008. TSC (USA) and the BBC as well as the Greek National Television ERT have featured him in special broadcast profiles and his CD release of Schumann Piano Works has been selected as one of BBC Music Magazine's Top 10 recommendations.

=== Teaching and other activities ===
Lazaridis has also been a teacher, an artistic director and the founder of new international cultural structures. In 2000, he co-founded ADAP, an International Association of Artists giving worldwide performances for Peace (www.adapinternational.com), from which he resigned after 10 years of activity, for ideological reasons. In 2006, he co-founded the Music-Village International Festival in Mount Pelion, one of the few international music societies of its kind (www.music-village.gr). Since early 2013, he is a founding member of the KYKLOS international ensemble. He has given Masterclasses on piano performance, body language and the Psychology of live interpretation at Trinity College of Music, Birmingham City University, Megaron Halls, Manhattan School of Music, Kutztown University and at numerous conservatoires in Greece and the United Kingdom. In April 2010, Lazaridis was a member of the jury for the 1st Sussex International Piano Competition. Since September 2010, he has held the post of artistic director at the Thessaloniki Concert Hall "Megaron" (www.tch.gr). He also served as Head of Music Programming at the Demetria International Festival, from January 2011 to January 2013.

=== Orchestral and chamber music collaborations, international festivals ===
Lazaridis has performed with orchestras such as the St Petersburg Philharmonic, Hamburg Philharmonic, Royal Philharmonic, Strasbourg Philharmonic, Warsaw Symphony, Munich Symphony, Wiener Kammer Orchester, The RTBF Symphony, Debrecen Symphony, London Festival Orchestra, English Symphony, all the Greek Symphony Orchestras, Athens Camerata and many more, under the direction of Sir Neville Marriner, Ingo Metzmacher, Yuri Temirkanov, Yoel Levi, Theodor Guschlbauer, Michel Tabachnik, Maxim Schostakovic, William Boughton, Alexander Myrat, Nikolai Alexeev, Michalis Economou and others.

In chamber music performances, Lazaridis has collaborated with ensembles and artists such as the Medici Quartet, Ysaye Quartet, Vienna Octet, BT Scottish Ensemble, Hellenic Quartet, Leonidas Kavakos, Huseyin Sermet, Dimitri Sgouros, Michael Tilson Thomas, Yannis Vakarelis and Cyprien Katsaris, among others. He has also performed in many International Festivals like Harrogate, Athens, Montpellier, Istanbul, Patras, Trento, Nafplion, Demetria, Norfolk & Norwich, Hampstead & Highgate, the Chopin International Festival, Springboard Trust Festival, Monterrei International Festival and many more. He has performed under the direction of such distinguished luminaries as Sir Neville Marriner, Ingo Metzmacher, Theodor Guschlbauer among others and has collaborated with renowned ensembles and artists including the Michael Tilson Thomas. He has also appeared at the Springboard Concerts Trust at the Wallace Collection in London.

=== Tours and forthcoming performances ===
Recent international tours have included the 'Rising Stars' concert series in Europe and New York, a tour with the Medici Quartet in Greece and the United Kingdom as well as a concert tour with the St Petersburg Philharmonic Orchestra under the direction of Yuri Temirkanov. Other recent concerts have included performances with the Qatar Philharmonic in Doha, the State Orchestra of Athens and the Izmir State Symphony, as well as recitals in London, Athens and Scotland. Upcoming performances include an international concert tour with the KYKLOS ensemble starting at the Athens International Festival 2013, sequel concerts at New York's Carnegie Hall and Princeton University, a series of recitals at the Athens Opera House and Oxford University, as well as concerto performances in Rumania and Estonia with the Bacau Philharmonic.

== Critical reception ==
Lazaridis' performances have been characterized as "Special enough to be beyond comparison" ([BBC Music Magazine], [Adrian Jack]), and of "Such drama, power and concentration, that hold their own even if you stop to consider celebrated recordings of Horowitz, Argerich, Brendel and Zimmerman".

== Recordings ==
TSC - USA, the BBC and the Greek National Television ERT have all featured Lazaridis with broadcast profiles. His recent CD releases of Schumann works for solo piano, R. Strauss and S. Rachmaninov sonatas for violin/cello and piano (Yuri Zisslin - violin and viola) as well as Liszt's B minor piano Sonata and Grandes Etudes de Paganini have been rapturously received. Getting five-star reviews from the International Press, including recommendations by Gramophone Magazine, International Piano, The Pianist, Diapason, and BBC Music magazine, which selected them as instrumental discs of the month.

Lazaridis' Liszt recordings were recently selected within the Top 50 best releases of the decade by "The Pianist" International magazine and his release of Schumann's "Papillon" has been ranked among the Five best historical performances, alongside keyboard giants such as Sviatoslav Richter and Claudio Arrau. Lazaridis is soon to release two new albums: one at ECM with George Koumendakis' piano concertos no. 3 and no. 4, both composed specially for him, and the other at SOMM with major works by Franz Schubert. In 2006 the artistic committee of ECHO (European Concert Hall Organization) selected Lazaridis as the Megaron Rising Star candidate for the 2006/07 season. This distinction will include recitals in Amsterdam, Athens, Birmingham, Brussels, New York, Paris, Salzburg, Stockholm and Vienna. Lazaridis has received a plenty of honorary awards and scholarships, including the prestigious Academy of Athens and the Worshipful Company of Musicians awards, the Queen Elizabeth (RCM), Cathleen Creed (TCM) the Onassis, Hattori and Levendis Foundations to name but a few. He is also an Artistic Director at Thessaloniki Concert Halls “Megaro”, Greece.

== Discography ==
- Schumann Piano Works (SOMM)
- Rachmaninov & Strauss - chamber music (SOMM)
- Liszt Piano Works (LINN)
- Schubert Piano Works (SOMM)
- Other audio and video excerpts can be found Here
- Liszt: Sonata in B minor; Grandes Études de Paganini
- Beethoven: Symphonies 1 & 5 (arr. Carl Czerny)
