= Daring Club Leuven =

- Full name: Koninklijke Daring Club Leuven
- Founded: 28 June 1922; 103 years ago (founded); 30 June 1945; 80 years ago (merger with Victoria Louvain); 30 June 1949; 76 years ago (merger with Hooger Op Leuven)
- Dissolved: 2002 (merged into OH Leuven)
- League: Belgian First Provincial Division
Home colours	Away colours

Daring Club Leuven, was a Belgian football club from the city of Leuven, Flemish Brabant that existed between 1922 and 2002, when it merged with Stade Leuven and F.C. Zwarte Duivels Oud-Heverlee to form Oud-Heverlee Leuven. The club played its home matches in Kessel-Lo.

== History ==
After being founded and joining the Belgian FA on 28 June 1922 to start with matricule n°223, the club played under several names in the first few seasons. Starting as Standard Club Sportif Louvaniste, then Football Club Leuven, before settling on Sporting Club Louvain, abbreviated as SC Louvain. Sporting Club Louvain was not the first club in Leuven, as both Stade Louvaniste (1903, matricule n°18) and Victoria FC Louvain (1922, matricule n°203) had already joined the Belgian FA at that point. The club slowly rose, reaching the Belgian Third Division for the first time in 1928, at that time the lowest level of national football. In the Third Division, SC Louvain was paired with both city rivals, but finished dead last, relegating back to the provincial levels immediately.

In 1934 the club was able to promote back into the national level, again meeting with their city rivals. This time however, SC Louvain was able to avoid relegation, already becoming fourth in 1936, the season in which Stade Leuven became champions. Until the end of the 1930s, the club remained one of the stronger teams in the division. After World War II, several football clubs from Leuven merged. SC Louvain merged with Victoria FC Louvain, continuing in the Belgian Third Division as Daring Club Leuven under matricule n°223 of SC Louvain.

In 1946 the club shortly dropped into the provincial division again, but was able to return immediately. In 1949 Hooger Op FC Leuven (matricule n°347), another football club from Leuven but which also had an athletics division, also merged into the club, which continued as Daring Club Leuven. The athletics division eventually would become Daring Club Leuven Atletiek.

Daring Club Leuven slowly became one of the stronger clubs in its division again, becoming third in 1950 and champions in 1951, promoting for the first time to the Belgian Second Division, where it met with Stade Leuven again. That same year, the club obtained the Royal designation, officially becoming Koninklijke Daring Club Leuven. It did not help the club's results, as it finished in penultimate position, relegating again to the Third Division, which was no longer the lowest national level due to the creation of the Belgian Fourth Division in 1952.

The following years, Daring Club Leuven mostly finished mid-table, being reunited with Stade Leuven from 1953 as they had relegated as well from the Second Division. Mediocre seasons followed, but with Stade Leuven dropping another level in 1958, Daring Club Leuven became the leading team from Leuven for several years, with results also starting to improve towards the end of the 1950s. In 1960 the club even ended as runners-up, followed by a third place in 1961, before the decline started. In 1964 only 9 points were obtained out of 30 matches, with the club finishing last as a result by a clear 14-point margin. For three seasons the club was reunited with Stade Leuven, now in the Fourth Division, before being relegated into the provincial leagues in 1967.

In took three seasons for the club to return to the national level for the last time, spending nine seasons in the Fourth Division from 1970 to 1979, with the highlight a second place in 1975, before finally dropping permanently into the provincial leagues.

The club sunk further down, eventually even ending up at the third provincial level (seventh level overall) in 1991. Towards the end of the 1990s, the club was going up and down between the first and second provincial level, finally spending its last season in the first provincial level in 2001–02, after which it dissolved as it merged with Stade Leuven and Zwarte Duivels Oud-Heverlee to form Oud-Heverlee Leuven. Zwarte Duivels Oud-Heverlee (matricule n°6142) was a much younger club from the neighboring municipality of Oud-Heverlee which had managed to climb up to the Belgian Third Division, allowing Oud-Heverlee Leuven to continue with its matricule in that division, causing the matricule of Stade Leuven and Daring Leuven to disappear.

== Honours ==
- Belgian Third Division:
  - Winners (1): 1950–51
- First Provincial Division:
  - Winners (3): 1933–34, 1946–47, 1969–70
- Second Provincial Division:
  - Winners (3): 1987–88, 1997–98, 2000–01
- Third Provincial Division:
  - Winners (1): 1993–94
