= Mohammad Usman (disambiguation) =

Mohammad Usman (1912–1948) was an Indian army officer.

Mohammad or Muhammad Usman may also refer to:

- Mohammad Usman of Madras (1884–1960), Indian politician and socialite
- Mohammad Usman (Balochistan politician), member of the National Assembly of Pakistan
- Mohammad Usman (Khyber Pakhtunkhwa politician), member of the Provincial Assembly of Khyber Pakhtunkhwa
- Mohammad Usman Rana (born 1985), Norwegian-Pakistani commentator and columnist
- Muhammad Usman (cricketer) (born 1985), cricketer from United Arab Emirates
- Muhammad Usman (field hockey) (born 1971), Pakistani field hockey player
- Mohammad Usman (Indian politician), member of the Uttar Pradesh Legislative Assembly, 1977-1980
- Mohammad Usman (academic), Australian quantum physicist

== See also ==
- Mohammed Usman (disambiguation)
