= Vichai Srivaddhanaprabha =

Thai businessman (1958–2018)

- วิชัย ศรีวัฒนประภา
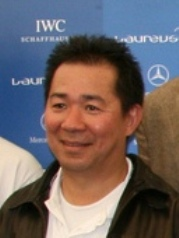
- Vichai in 2007
- Born: Vichai Raksriaksorn; 4 April 1958; Bangkok, Thailand
- Died: 27 October 2018 (aged 60); Leicester, England
- Occupations: Owner and chairman of King Power International Group; Owner and chairman of Leicester City; Chairman of OH Leuven
- Spouse: Aimon Srivaddhanaprabha
- Children: 4, including Aiyawatt

Vichai Srivaddhanaprabha (Thai: วิชัย ศรีวัฒนประภา; (Note: RTGS: Wichai Siwatthanaprapha, pronounced [wí.tɕʰāj sǐː.wát.tʰā.ná.prā.pʰāː]) born Vichai Raksriaksorn, Thai: วิชัย รักศรีอักษร; (Note: RTGS: Wichai Raksi-akson, pronounced [rák.sǐːʔàk.sɔ̌ːn]) (Note: Thai people are referred to by given name; the subject was mostly known as Khun Vichai.) 4 April 1958 – 27 October 2018) was a Thai billionaire businessman and the founder, owner, and chairman of King Power. He was the owner of then Premier League team Leicester City from 2010 until his death in a helicopter crash just outside the club's King Power Stadium in 2018.

== Career ==
Vichai was the founder and CEO of King Power, an operator of duty-free shops. In December 2009, King Power received the royal warrant from King Bhumibol of Thailand in a ceremony attended by Vichai. In October 2018, he was ranked by Forbes magazine as the 5th richest man in Thailand, reportedly worth US$4.9 billion.

The first football match Vichai watched in England was the 1997 League Cup final between Leicester City and Middlesbrough, which may have attracted him to the club. In August 2010, the Asia Football Investments consortium including Vichai and his son Aiyawatt purchased English Football League Championship club Leicester City. He succeeded Milan Mandarić as chairman of the club in February 2011 while continuing as owner, and Aiyawatt became the vice chairman. In July 2011, Leicester's Walkers Stadium was renamed King Power Stadium.

Leicester City went on to win the 2015–16 Premier League title after starting the season as 5000/1 rank outsiders. Shortly before the 2016–17 season, Vichai gave 19 players a BMW i8—at £100,000 each—as a gift for winning the title.

In May 2017, he bought his second football club, OH Leuven in Belgium.

== Personal life ==
Vichai Raksriaksorn was born into a Thai Chinese family. His father, Wiwat Raksriaksorn (Chinese: 徐利明) traces his roots to Zhao'an, Fujian, China. Vichai married Aimon, with whom he had four children: Voramas, Apichet, Aroonroong, and Aiyawatt. In 2012, the King of Thailand Bhumibol Adulyadej bestowed the family the new surname of Srivaddhanaprabha, which means "light of progressive glory". He was awarded an honorary doctorate as a Doctor of Laws by the University of Leicester in 2016. As a young man, Vichai studied in Taiwan and the United States.

In his spare time, Vichai was an avid polo player, and owned the VR Polo Club in Bangkok. He was the president of Ham Polo Club in London from 2008 to 2012. In addition, his sons Apichet and Aiyawatt competed in the 2017 Southeast Asian Games, representing Thailand's national polo team and earning a team silver medal.

Vichai believed that Leicester City F.C.'s success or failure was affected by karma, and he therefore endeavored to build Buddhist temples and support Buddhist monks to accumulate good karma. Vichai had a good relationship with the Thai monk Phra Prommangkalachan and his fellow monks, who often blessed the team players, either in England or at the monks' home temple in Thailand, Wat Traimit. The monks flying in to see the players of the team became a common sight. In 2015, Aiyawatt became ordained as a Buddhist monk for a month.

In April 2019, The Asian Awards honoured him with the Outstanding Contribution to the Community Award.

== Death ==
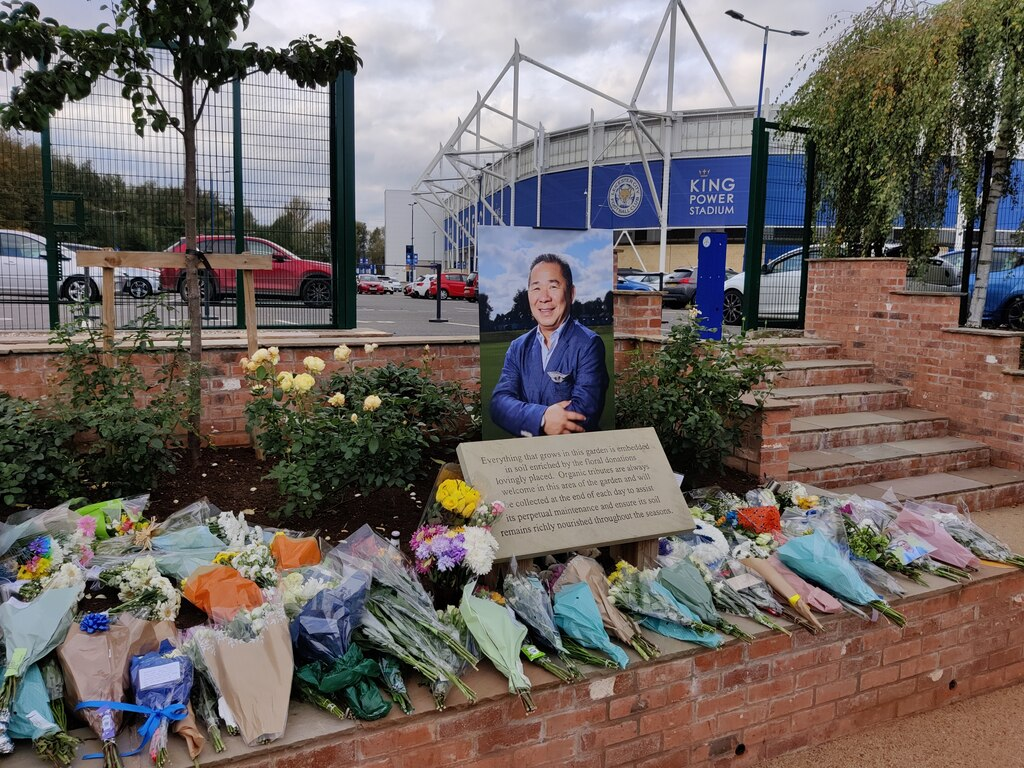
Vichai Srivaddhanaprabha Memorial Garden at the King Power Stadium

On 27 October 2018, Vichai's AgustaWestland AW169 helicopter crashed outside King Power Stadium shortly after taking off from the pitch. Eyewitnesses described seeing the helicopter spinning before crashing and creating a fireball. The next day, it was confirmed that Vichai, along with the pilots and two other passengers had died in the crash. Numerous tributes were laid for Vichai outside the stadium by players along with fans of Leicester City and other football clubs. In accordance with Thai burial customs, Vichai's funeral lasted for eight days, beginning on 3 November. Vichai is fondly remembered by Leicester supporters.

In January 2025, the family of Srivaddhanaprabha announced that they were suing Leonardo, manufacturer of the helicopter of the incident, for in excess of £2 billion for loss of earnings and other damages.
