= Willy Eras =

Costa Rican footballer (born 1980)

Personal information
- Full name: Willy Eras Sánchez
- Date of birth: 10 September 1980 (age 46)
- Place of birth: Costa Rica
- Height: 1.68 m (5 ft 6 in)
- Position: Midfielder

Team information
- Current team: Municipal Liberia

Senior career*
Years	Team	Apps	(Gls)
2001–2010	Liberia Mia	112	(2)
2011	Barrio México	7	(0)
2011–2012	Puntarenas	30	(0)
2012	Herediano	1	(0)
2013–2014	Municipal Liberia		

International career^{‡}
2007	Costa Rica	2	(0)
- * Club domestic league appearances and goals as of October 20, 2011 ‡ National team caps and goals as of October 20, 2008

Willy Eras Sánchez (born 10 September 1980) is a Costa Rican professional footballer who currently plays for Municipal Liberia.

== Club career ==
Eras started his career at Liberia Mia, winning promotion with them to the top level Premier Division and clinching the 2009 winter title. He later played for Barrio México, Puntarenas and Herediano.

In February 2013, Eras returned to then second division side Municipal Liberia.

== International career ==
Eras has made two appearances for the Costa Rica national football team, his debut coming in a friendly against Peru on August 22, 2007 and his final international was on 12 September 2007 against Canada.
