= Dalibor Mitrović (born 1980) =

Serbian footballer

Personal information
- Full name: Dalibor Mitrović
- Date of birth: 3 October 1980 (age 46)
- Place of birth: Leskovac, SFR Yugoslavia
- Height: 1.76 m (5 ft 9 1/2 in)
- Position: Defender

Senior career*
Years	Team	Apps	(Gls)
2001–2002	Rad	7	(0)
2002–2003	Vojvodina	0	(0)
2002–2003	→ Dubočica (loan)	16	(0)
2003–2005	BSK Borča	25	(4)
2005–2006	Dubočica		
2005–2006	→ Bežanija (loan)	6	(1)
2006–2007	Dinamo Vranje	14	(1)
2007	→ Mladi Radnik (loan)	13	(4)
2007–2009	Dubočica		
2009–2012	Moravac Mrštane		
2013–2014	Dubočica	14	(1)
- * Club domestic league appearances and goals as of 30 October 2014

Dalibor Mitrović (Serbian Cyrillic: Далибор Митровић; born October 1980) is a Serbian football defender.
