= Jean-Reck Ah Fok =

Mauritian footballer

Jean-Reck Ah Fock
Personal information
- Full name: Jean-Reck Ah Fock
- Date of birth: 24 June 1980 (age 46)
- Place of birth: Mauritius
- Position: Striker

Senior career*
Years	Team	Apps	(Gls)
2001–2010	US Beau-Bassin/Rose Hill	?	(?)
2011–	PAS Mates	?	(?)

International career
2002	Mauritius	3	(0)
- * Club domestic league appearances and goals

Jean-Reck Ah Fock (born 9 February 1983) is a Mauritian footballer who played as a striker for PAS Mates and the Mauritius national football team in 2002.
