= F.C. Zwarte Duivels Oud-Heverlee =

Belgian football club

Zwarte Duivels Oud-Heverlee
- Full name: Football Club Zwarte Duivels Oud-Heverlee
- Founded: 20 December 1957; 67 years ago
- Dissolved: 2002 (merged into OH Leuven)
- League: Belgian Third Division B
- 2001: 3rd
Home colours	Away colours

F.C. Zwarte Duivels Oud-Heverlee, also called Zwarte Duivels Oud-Heverlee, Zwarte Duivels or Oud-Heverlee, was a Belgian football club from the municipality of Oud-Heverlee, Flemish Brabant that existed between 1957 and 2002, when it merged with Stade Leuven and Daring Club Leuven to form Oud-Heverlee Leuven.

== History ==
In 1957 F.C. Zwarte Duivels Oud-Heverlee joined the Belgian FA, receiving matricule n°6142. In 1996 the club became champions in the First Provincial Division, thereby promoting into the national level of football for the first time. In 2000, the club became champions again in the Belgian Fourth Division, moving into the Belgian Third Division. There they finished in third place during the 2001–02 season, qualifying for the promotion playoffs. Due to financial difficulties, the club did however not apply for a football license to play in the Belgian Second Division, but rather merged with Stade Leuven and Daring Club Leuven to form Oud-Heverlee Leuven.

== Honours ==
- Belgian Fourth Division:
  - Winners (1): 1999–2000
- First Provincial Division:
  - Winners (1): 1995–96
- Second Provincial Division:
  - Winners (1): 1993–94
- Third Provincial Division:
  - Winners (1): 1981–82
