= Dani Ferron =

Andorran football player

Dani Ferrón
Personal information
- Date of birth: 13 March 1980 (age 46)
- Place of birth: Andorra
- Position: Defender

Team information
- Current team: FC Andorra

International career
Years	Team	Apps	(Gls)
2001–2004	Andorra	4	(0)

Daniel Ferrón Pérez (born 13 March 1980) is an Andorran football player. He has played for Andorra national team.

== National team statistics ==
Andorra national team
Year	Apps	Goals
2001	1	0
2002	1	0
2003	1	0
2004	1	0
Total	4	0
