= Thomas Levaux =

French footballer (born 1980)

Personal information
- Date of birth: March 20, 1980 (age 46)
- Place of birth: Le Creusot, France
- Height: 1.87 m (6 ft 1 1/2 in)
- Position: Goalkeeper

Team information
- Current team: beaune

Senior career*
Years	Team	Apps	(Gls)
1997–1999	Nancy (B team)		
1999–2000	CO Saint-Dizier		
2000–2001	Paris Saint-Germain (B team)		
2001	Internacional		
2002	América - RJ		
2002–2003	Sedan (B team)		
2003–2009	US Créteil-Lusitanos	36	(0)
2009–	AS Moulins		
- * Club domestic league appearances and goals as of 18:37, 20 November 2009 (UTC)

Thomas Levaux (born March 20, 1980, in Le Creusot) is a French professional football player. Currently, he plays in the Championnat National for AS Moulins.

He played on the professional level in Ligue 2 for US Créteil-Lusitanos.
