= Zakhele Manyatsi =

Swaziland footballer

Personal information
- Full name: Zakhele Manyatsi
- Date of birth: 7 September 1980 (age 46)
- Place of birth: Swaziland
- Position: Defender

Senior career*
Years	Team	Apps	(Gls)
2003–2005	Hub Sundowns		
2005–	Royal Leopards		

International career
2006–	Swaziland	12	(0)
- * Club domestic league appearances and goals

Zakhele Manyatsi (born 7 September 1980) is a Swaziland international footballer who plays as a defender. As of January 2010, he plays for Royal Leopards in the Swazi Premier League and has won 12 caps for his country.
