= Edgard Lima =

Brazilian footballer (born 1980)

Personal information
- Full name: Edgard Lima de Melo
- Date of birth: June 10, 1980 (age 46)
- Place of birth: Santos, Brazil
- Height: 1.85 m (6 ft 1 in)
- Position: Striker

Team information
- Current team: Al-Ahli (Amman)

Senior career*
Years	Team	Apps	(Gls)
?–2007	Jabaquara		
2007–2008	Varginha		
2008–2008	Al-Karamah		
2008–2009	Minervén FC		
2009	América (MG)		
2010	Nacional Futebol Clube		
2010–	Al-Ahli (Amman)		
- Latakia FC(FC Latakia)
- * Club domestic league appearances and goals as of 15 March 2009

Edgard Lima de Melo (born June 10, 1980) is a Brazilian football player who is currently playing for América (MG).

According to Ecuadorian newspapers, Luís is a transfer target of Barcelona Sporting Club for the 2010 season.
