= Steeve Théophile =

French footballer (born 1980)

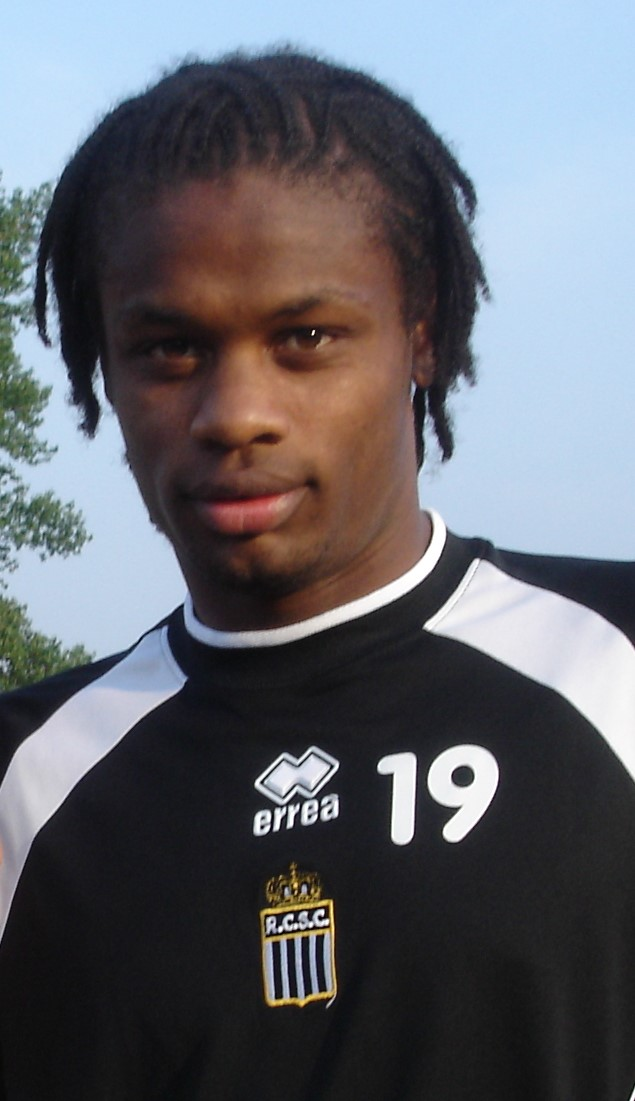
Théophile with Sporting Charleroi

Steeve Alain Théophile (born 9 September 1980) is a French former professional footballer who played as a midfielder. He played three matches in Ligue 1 for Istres in the 2004–05 season and played 55 matches and scored 9 goals in Ligue 2 for Gueugnon and Créteil during 2002–2004 period.
