= Arthur (footballer, born 1980) =

Brazilian footballer

Personal information
- Full name: Arthur Teixeira Viégas
- Date of birth: October 29, 1980 (age 45)
- Place of birth: Rio de Janeiro, Brazil
- Height: 1.78 m (5 ft 10 in)
- Position: Forward

Senior career*
| Years | Team | Apps | (Gls) |
| 2000–2001 | CFZ | | |
| 2002 | SV Blankensee | | |
| 2002 | CFZ de Brasília | | |
| 2003 | Botafogo PB | | |
| 2004 | Universidad Católica | | |
| 2004 | CFZ | | |
| 2005 | Sampaio Corrêa | | |
| 2005 | Náutico | | |
| 2006 | Clube do Remo | | |
| 2007 | Próspera | | |
| 2007 | Independente | | |
| 2007–2009 | Al Salibikhaet | | |
- * Club domestic league appearances and goals as of 8 Oct 2010

Arthur Teixeira Viégas (born October 29, 1980) is a Brazilian footballer who plays as a forward.

Born in Rio de Janeiro, Arthur began playing football with Centro de Futebol Zico Sociedade Esportiva. After playing for Botafogo Futebol Clube (PB), Sampaio Corrêa Futebol Clube, Clube Náutico Capibaribe and Clube do Remo in Brazil, he signed with Kuwaiti Division One side Al Salibikhaet.
