= Kert Kütt =

Estonian footballer

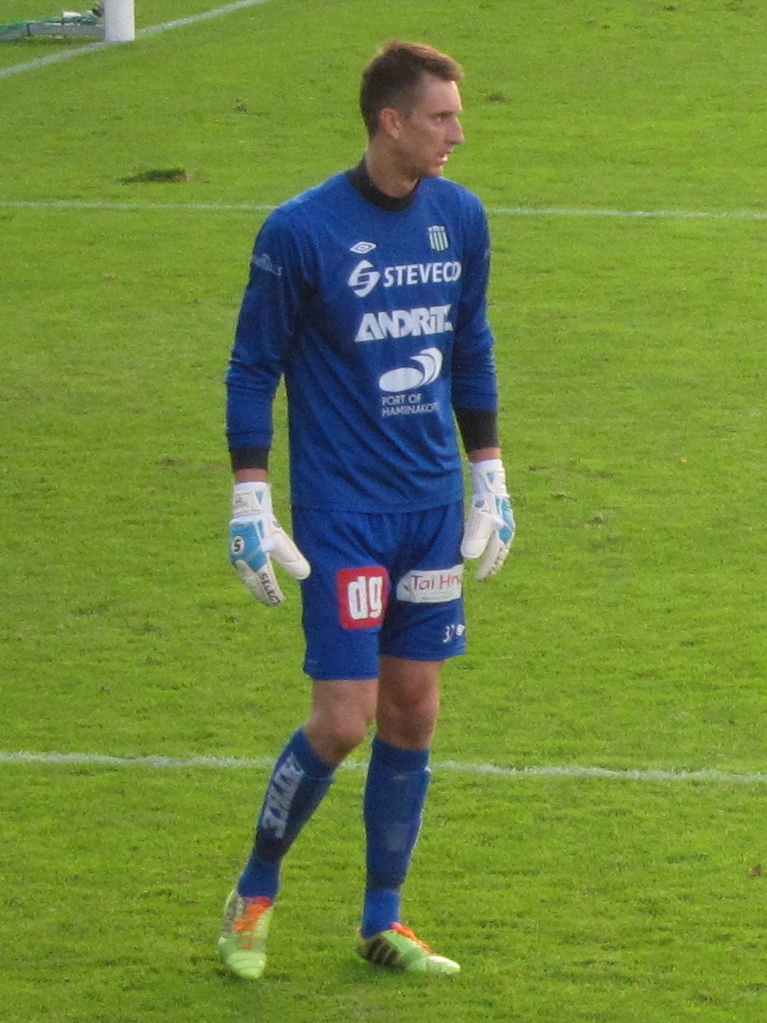
- Kütt in 2014

Personal information
- Full name: Kert Kütt
- Date of birth: 9 October 1980 (age 46)
- Place of birth: Pärnu, then part of Estonian SSR, Soviet Union
- Height: 1.99 m (6 ft 6 in)
- Position: Goalkeeper

Senior career*
Years	Team	Apps	(Gls)
- Flora
2001	Valga Warrior		
2002–2004	Viljandi Tulevik		
2005	Kuressaare	12	(0)
2005–2007	Tammeka	82	(0)
2008–2009	Levadia	10	(0)
2008–2009	Levadia II	30	(0)
2010–2011	Nõmme Kalju	64	(0)
2012	Army United	0	(0)
2012	Haka	13	(0)
2013–2014	KTP	27	(0)
2015	Valdres		
2016	Paide Linnameeskond	34	(0)

International career
	Estonia U21	8	(0)
2002	Estonia U23	1	(0)
- * Club domestic league appearances and goals

Kert Kütt (born 9 October 1980 in Pärnu) is a retired Estonian professional footballer who last played for Paide Linnameeskond in the Estonian Meistriliiga as a goalkeeper. He has previously had spells in Estonian Meistriliiga and the Finnish Veikkausliiga.
