= Lartee Jackson =

Liberian footballer

Personal information
- Full name: Lartee Jackson
- Date of birth: October 5, 1980 (age 46)
- Place of birth: Liberia
- Position: Goalkeeper

Team information
- Current team: Invincible Eleven

Senior career*
Years	Team	Apps	(Gls)
2002	Invincible Eleven		

International career
2005	Liberia	1	(0)
- * Club domestic league appearances and goals as of 13:42, 15 December 2007 (UTC)

Lartee Jackson (born October 5, 1980) is a Liberian former footballer who last played Invincible Eleven. He was also a member of the Liberia national football team.
