= Lazarides =

Lazarides is a surname. Notable people with the surname include:

- Apo Lazaridès (1925–1998), French cyclist, brother of Lucien
- Lucien Lazaridès (1922–2005), French cyclist
- Steve Lazarides (born 1969), English art dealer

== See also ==
- Lazaridis
