= Youssou Diop =

Senegalese association football player (born 1980)

Personal information
- Date of birth: 5 May 1980
- Place of birth: Ziguinchor, Senegal

Youth career
- Stade Lavallois

Senior career*
Years	Team	Apps	(Gls)
- Toulouse FC B
2001/2002	GSI Pontivy		
2002/2003	US Luzenac		
2003-2004	US Albi		
2004	USR		
2004	Kidderminster Harriers F.C.	10	(0)
2005	Notts County F.C. (trial)		
2006-2007	FACV		
2007-2008	Blagnac FC		
- FU Narbonne
2012-2013	Toulouse Rodéo FC		
2015/2016	FC Mantois 78		

International career
- Senegal (youth)
- * Club domestic league appearances and goals

Youssou Diop (born 5 May 1980) is a Senegalese retired footballer.

== England ==
Continuing his career at Kidderminster Harriers from August to November 2004, Diop was described as 'fast' and mobile' and was on target twice, with both goals coming in preseason, including a long shot in a 2–1 loss to Gloucester. He refused treatment from physiotherapist Jim Conway or to get on the stretcher despite receiving an injury at Grimsby's Blundell Park ground on 20 November. On that day, an injured Diop had hobbled half the length of the pitch, from the goal-line to the tunnel, and did not speak to the physiotherapist. Conway stated later that the fans were making spurious claims about the incident.
