= Jérémie Peiffer =

Luxembourgish footballer

Personal information
- Date of birth: 7 April 1980 (age 46)
- Place of birth: Luxembourg
- Position: Midfielder

Senior career*
Years	Team	Apps	(Gls)
1999–2002	Jeunesse Esch	30	(1)
2002–2003	Progrès Niedercorn	18	(2)
2003–2009	FC Differdange 03		
2009–2014	CS Fola Esch		

International career^{‡}
2007	Luxembourg	2	(0)
- * Club domestic league appearances and goals as of 17 July 2009 ‡ National team caps and goals as of 14 September 2009

Jérémie Peiffer (born 7 April 1980) is a Luxembourgish football player.
