= Marco Mendoza (footballer) =

Mexican footballer (born 1980)

Personal information
- Full name: Marco Antonio Mendoza Sevilla
- Date of birth: 18 September 1980 (age 46)
- Place of birth: Mexico D.F., Mexico
- Height: 1.74 m (5 ft 9 in)
- Position: Midfielder

Youth career
- 1996–????: Cachorros de León

Senior career*
Years	Team	Apps	(Gls)
2001–2003	Club León	26	(0)
2003–2004	Lagartos de Tabasco	25	(0)
2004–2005	Club León	46	(3)
2005–2006	Dorados de Sinaloa	19	(0)
2006–2007	Monarcas Morelia 'A'	19	(0)
2008–2009	Petroleros de Salamanca	16	(1)
2009–2010	La Piedad	30	(1)
2010–2011	Correcaminos UAT	42	(1)
- * Club domestic league appearances and goals as of September 22, 2009

Marco Antonio Mendoza Sevilla (born 18 September 1980) is a Mexican football midfielder, who plays for Correcaminos UAT in Liga de Ascenso.

Mendoza began his career with the Club León youth team, Cachorros. It was with León that Mendoza made his professional debut, as the team was playing in the Primera Division de Mexico. After León was relegated, he moved to Lagartos de Tabasco, but their stay in the Primera Division A was short-lived.

After going back to León and playing there for a while, Mendoza was later transferred to Dorados de Sinaloa, where he made a return to the top flight.

After the team dropped out of the Primera Division, he played in the Monarcas Morelia system, but never broke into the first team. He instead had better luck with Petroleros de Salamanca.

When Salamanca in 2009 became La Piedad, Mendoza was one of the handful of players that left with the team.
