= Sayuti =

Indonesian footballer

Personal information
- Date of birth: 30 June 1980 (age 46)
- Place of birth: Pidie, Indonesia
- Height: 1.60 m (5 ft 3 in)
- Position: Striker

Youth career
- PSAP U-21

Senior career*
Years	Team	Apps	(Gls)
2008–2014	PSAP Sigli	112	(18)
2015–2017	PS Pidie Jaya	29	(7)

Managerial career
- 2018–: PS Pidie Jaya (Assistant coach)
- * Club domestic league appearances and goals

Sayuti (born June 30, 1980) is an Indonesian professional football coach and former player who is currently assistant coach of PS Pidie Jaya in the Liga 3.

== Club statistics ==
Club	Season	Super League		Premier Division		Piala Indonesia		Total	
Club	Season	Apps	Goals	Apps	Goals	Apps	Goals	Apps	Goals
PSAP Sigli	2011-12	32	3	-		-		32	3
Total		32	3	-		-		32	3

== Honours ==
=== Club ===
PS Pidie Jaya

- 2016 ISC Liga Nusantara Aceh zone: 2016
