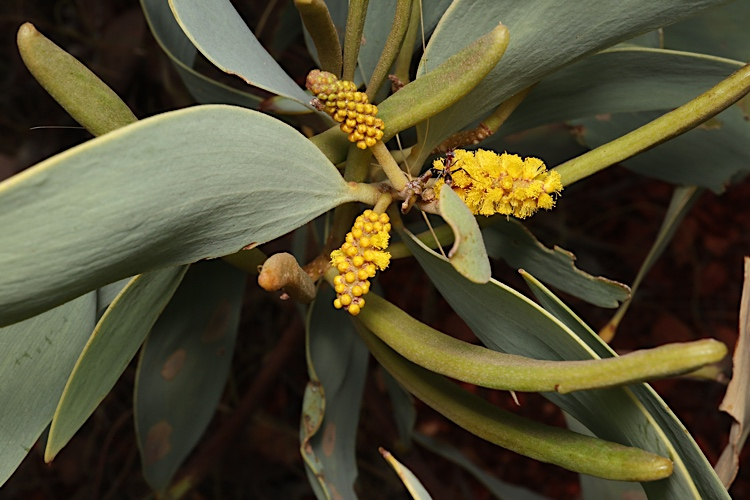
- Between Camooweal and Mount Isa

Scientific classification
- Kingdom: Plantae
- Clade: Embryophytes
- Clade: Tracheophytes
- Clade: Spermatophytes
- Clade: Angiosperms
- Clade: Eudicots
- Clade: Rosids
- Order: Fabales
- Family: Fabaceae
- Subfamily: Caesalpinioideae
- Clade: Mimosoid clade
- Genus: Acacia
- Species: A. lazaridis

Binomial name
- Acacia lazaridis Pedley
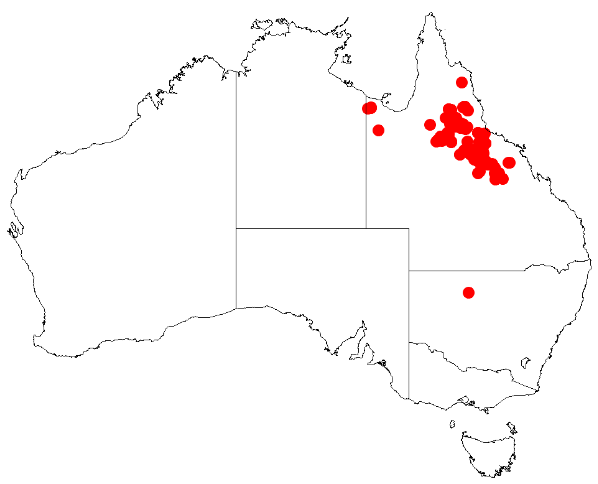
- Occurrence data from AVH

Synonyms
- Acacia aulacocarpa var. brevifolia Benth.; Acacia brevifolia (F.Muell. ex Benth.) Benth. nom. illeg.; Acacia leptophleba var. brevifolia Domin nom. inval., pro syn.; Acacia leptophleba var. brevifolia Pedley nom. inval., pro syn.; Racosperma lazaridis (Pedley) Pedley

= Acacia lazaridis =

Species of legume

Acacia lazaridis is a species of flowering plant in the family Fabaceae and is endemic to north-eastern Queensland, Australia. It is a shrub with more or less flattened branchlets with prominent ridges, narrowly oblong, elliptic to narrowly egg-shaped phyllodes, spikes of yellow flowers and narrowly elliptic to lance-shaped or elliptic, pods.

== Description ==
Acacia lazaridis is a glabrous shrub that typically grows to a height of 0.5–2.5 m (1 ft 8 in – 8 ft 2 in) and has more or less flattened maroon-brown branchlets with prominent ridges, usually covered with a powdery white coating, later becoming grey. Its phyllodes are narrowly oblong, elliptic to narrowly egg-shaped, mostly 3–6.5 mm (0.12–0.26 in) long, 7–30 mm (0.28–1.18 in) wide, stiff and leathery with three prominent longitudinal veins. The flowers are yellow and borne in spikes 10–20 mm (0.39–0.79 in) long on peduncles mostly 10–20 mm (0.39–0.79 in) long. Flowering occurs from February to November, and the pods are narrowy elliptic or lance-shaped with the narrower end towards the base to elliptic, 3.4–5.8 mm (0.13–0.23 in) long, often dark purplish or reddish-brown, opening and curling back from the end. The seeds are oblong, 4–5 mm (0.16–0.20 in) long and dark brown with a narrowly conical aril.

== Taxonomy ==
Acacia lazaridis was first formally described in 1981 by Leslie Pedley in the journal Austrobaileya, replacing Bentham's synonym Acacia aulacocarpa var. brevifolia. The specific epithet (lazaridis) honours Michael Lazarides who worked at the Australian National Herbarium.

== Distribution and habitat ==
This species of wattle grows in gravelly red earth or shallow sandy soil in open forest, woodland or scrub with otherAcacia and Triodia species on sandstone, granite or metamorphic rocks in the Cook and Kennedy districts, Queensland, often on the slopes of the Great Dividing Range.

== Conservation status ==
Acacia lazaridis in listed as 'least concern' under the Queensland Government Nature Conservation Act 1992.

== See also ==
- List of Acacia species
