= Ibón Larrazábal =

Spanish footballer

Personal information
- Full name: Ibón Larrazábal Landa
- Date of birth: 22 January 1980 (age 46)
- Place of birth: Mungia, Spain
- Height: 1.78 m (5 ft 10 in)
- Position: Midfielder

Youth career
- 1995–1998: Athletic Bilbao

Senior career*
Years	Team	Apps	(Gls)
1998–2000	Chantrea		
2000–2003	Osasuna B	107	(3)
2003–2004	Real Unión	36	(0)
2004–2008	Sestao	90	(1)
2008–2009	Eibar	26	(0)
2009–2013	Sestao	142	(2)
Total		401	(6)
- * Club domestic league appearances and goals

Ibón Larrazábal Landa (born 22 January 1980 in Mungia, Biscay) is a Spanish retired footballer who played as a defensive midfielder.
