= Mikhail Nekrasov =

Russian footballer

Personal information
- Full name: Mikhail Vyacheslavovich Nekrasov
- Date of birth: 17 September 1980 (age 46)
- Height: 1.82 m (5 ft 11 1/2 in)
- Positions: Midfielder; defender

Senior career*
Years	Team	Apps	(Gls)
1998–1999	FC Avangard Kursk	58	(2)
2000–2001	Policijas FK	37	(1)
2002	FC Neftekhimik Nizhnekamsk	27	(0)
2003	FC Sodovik Sterlitamak	19	(1)
2003–2011	FC Avangard Kursk	205	(12)
2011	FC Gubkin	8	(1)
2012	FC Sever Murmansk	4	(0)

Managerial career
- 2021: FC Avangard Kursk (caretaker)
- 2021–2023: FC Avangard Kursk (assistant)
- * Club domestic league appearances and goals

Mikhail Vyacheslavovich Nekrasov (Russian: Михаил Вячеславович Некрасов; born 17 September 1980) is a Russian professional football coach and a former player.

== Club career ==
He played 5 seasons in the Russian Football National League for FC Neftekhimik Nizhnekamsk and FC Avangard Kursk.
