= Leonid Lazaridi =

Russian footballer

Personal information
- Full name: Leonid Gomerovich Lazaridi
- Date of birth: 17 April 1980 (age 46)
- Height: 1.80 m (5 ft 11 in)
- Position: Defender

Senior career*
Years	Team	Apps	(Gls)
1997–1999	FC Zhemchuzhina Sochi	1	(0)
1997–1999	→ FC Zhemchuzhina-2 Sochi	78	(4)
2000	FC Chernomorets Novorossiysk	0	(0)
2000	→ FC Chernomorets-d Novorossiysk	7	(0)
2000	FC Tsentr-R-Kavkaz Krasnodar (amateur)		
2001	FC Rubin Kazan	0	(0)
2002	FC Dynamo Poltavskaya		
2002	FC Nemkom Krasnodar	19	(1)
2003	FC Chkalovets-1936 Novosibirsk	9	(1)
2003	FC Selenga Ulan-Ude	11	(0)
2006–2007	FC Mashuk-KMV Pyatigorsk	37	(0)
2007–2008	FC Aroma Gulkevichi		
2008–2012	FC Rubin Novolokinskaya		
2012	FC Elektroavtomatika Stavropol		
2012	FC Ipatovo		
2013	FC Afips Afipsky (amateur)		
2014	FC Afips-2 Afipsky		
- * Club domestic league appearances and goals

Leonid Gomerovich Lazaridi (Russian: Леонид Гомерович Лазариди; born 17 April 1980) is a former Russian football player.
