= Mohammed Usman (footballer, born 1980) =

Nigerian footballer

Personal information
- Full name: Mohammed Usman Edu
- Date of birth: June 12, 1980 (age 46)
- Place of birth: Okene, Nigeria
- Position: Midfielder

Team information
- Current team: Kwara United F.C.
- Number: 35

Youth career
- Kwara State University

Senior career*
| Years | Team | Apps | (Gls) |
| 2000–2003 | Julius Berger F.C. | 66 | (10) |
| 2004 | Jigawa Golden Stars F.C. | 13 | (3) |
| 2005–present | Kwara United F.C. | 64 | (7) |
- * Club domestic league appearances and goals

Mohammed Usman Edu (born June 12, 1980) is a Nigerian footballer. He plays for Kwara United F.C. of Ilorin.

== Career ==
Otherwise called ‘Smart', Usman hails from Okene of Okene local government area of Kogi State, he has his eyes to play professional football abroad.

He played for Julius Berger F.C. of Lagos where he won a third place in the Coca-Cola FA Cup in the 2001/2002 season. He played than one season in 2004 for Jigawa Golden Stars and signed in February 2005 for Kwara United F.C.
