= 2018 Leicester helicopter crash =

2018 helicopter accident in England

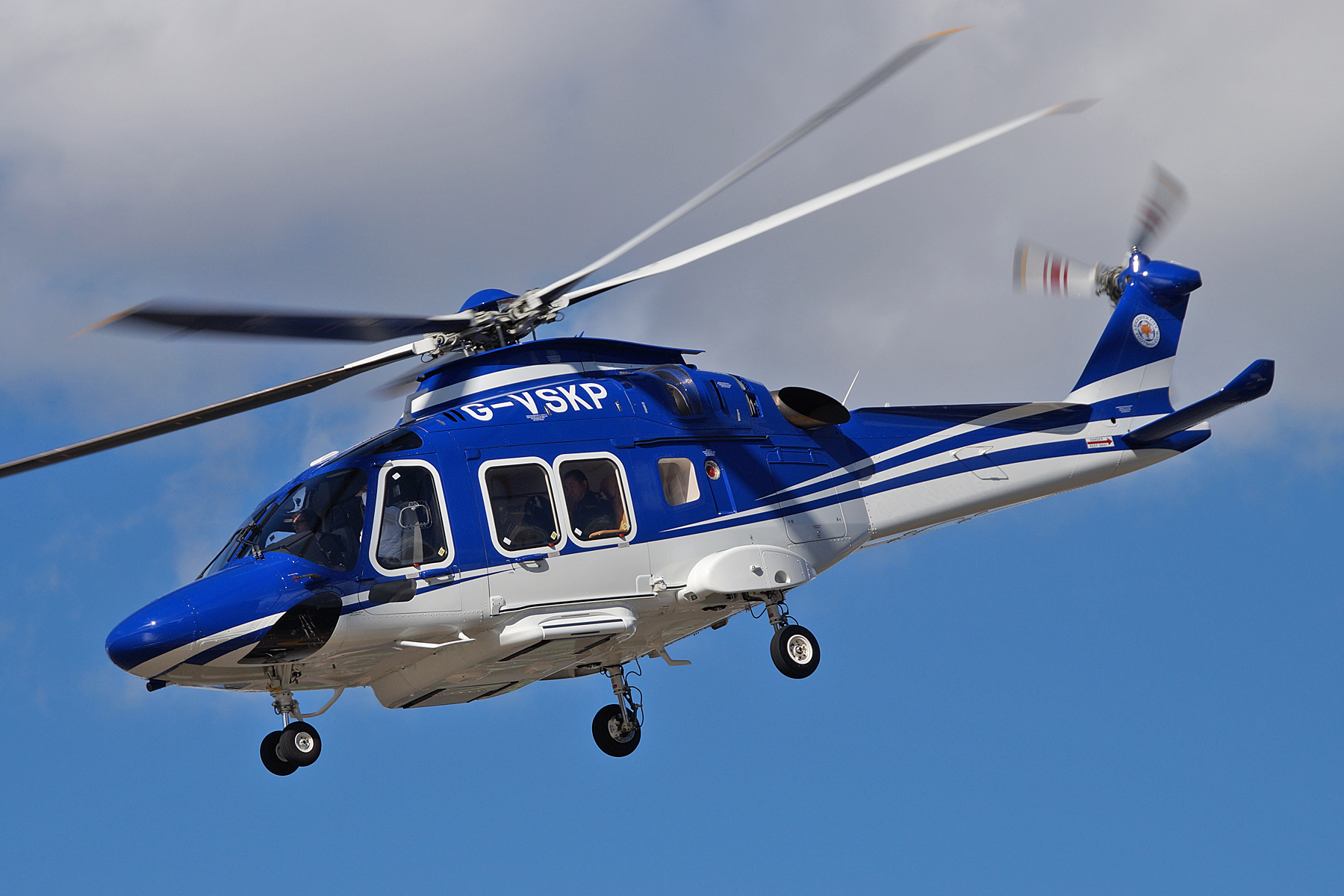
- G-VSKP, the helicopter involved in the accident, seen in 2016

Accident
- Date: 27 October 2018
- Summary: Loss of yaw control due to tail rotor control linkage failure
- Site: Leicester, England; 52°37′07″N 1°08′27″W
- Total fatalities: 5
- Total injuries: 4

Aircraft
- Aircraft type: Leonardo AW169
- Operator: Amadeus Aviation
- Registration: G-VSKP
- Flight origin: King Power Stadium, Leicester, England
- Destination: London Luton Airport, Luton, England
- Occupants: 5
- Passengers: 4
- Crew: 1
- Fatalities: 5
- Survivors: 0

Ground casualties
- Ground injuries: 4

On 27 October 2018, a Leonardo AW169 helicopter crashed shortly after take-off from Leicester City's King Power Stadium in Leicester, England, while en route to Luton Airport. All people on board—the pilot and four passengers, including club chairman Vichai Srivaddhanaprabha—were killed in the crash. The Air Accidents Investigation Branch attributed the crash to a loss of yaw control owing to a failure of the tail rotor control linkage.

== History of the flight ==
Vichai Srivaddhanaprabha frequently travelled to and from the stadium in the helicopter for Leicester City's matches, with the Leicester Mercury describing it as "a familiar sight for Foxes fans." On 27 October, the helicopter departed Fairoaks Airport in Surrey with the pilot and his girlfriend on board. It stopped at London Heliport to collect three additional passengers—Srivaddhanaprabha and two members of his staff—before departing at 14:43 BST (13:43 UTC). It arrived at the Leicester City Football Club Training Ground on Belvoir Drive, 1.5 miles (2 km) south of the King Power Stadium at 15:58 BST (14:58 UTC). All on board disembarked and travelled by car to the stadium for Leicester's game against West Ham United. The pilot and his girlfriend returned after the football match concluded and then, as was usual, flew the helicopter to the stadium to collect Srivaddhanaprabha and his two staff members. The helicopter was seen preparing to lift off from the pitch live on BT Sport, during a post-match broadcast.

The aircraft was due to fly to Luton Airport.

== Accident ==
Deaths by nationality
Nation	Deaths
Thailand	3
United Kingdom	1
Poland	1
Total	5

With Vichai, the pilot and three other people on board, the helicopter took off from within the stadium at approximately 20:37 BST (19:37 UTC). As the pilot turned the helicopter towards its en-route heading, the tail rotor control linkage broke, sending the helicopter into an uncontrollable spin. One witness described the aircraft falling "like a stone to the floor". It struck the ground in stadium Car Park E, about 200 metres (220 yd) from the stadium, and burst into flames. Two police officers and two club staff leaving the stadium attempted to rescue those in the helicopter but had to retreat due to the heat and flames. They sustained heat injuries. Investigators ruled out a suggestion of a collision with a police drone as a possible cause.

The following day, Leicestershire Police confirmed that everybody on board had been killed in the crash and subsequent fire, and named the five fatalities. They were three Thais: club owner Vichai Srivaddhanaprabha and two members of his staff—Kaveporn Punpare and Nusara Suknamai, British pilot Eric Swaffer, and his Polish girlfriend, Izabela Róża Lechowicz. Lechowicz was also a helicopter pilot but was not flying that day. A small memorial has been erected at East Sheen Cemetery for these two pilots. It was determined that four of the five occupants survived the crash, but with disabling injuries that prevented their escape from the helicopter. They died in the consequent fire.

Two police officers, Michael Hooper and Stephen Quartermain, suffered burns and smoke inhalation attempting to rescue the occupants, and subsequently were nominated for a national police bravery award as well as receiving Queen's Gallantry Medals.

== Aircraft ==
The aircraft involved in the accident was a Leonardo AW169 helicopter, registration G-VSKP, c/n 69018, manufactured in 2016. It seated 10 people and weighed roughly 4,500 kilograms (9,900 lb). It was powered by two Pratt & Whitney Canada PW210A engines. The aircraft was owned by Foxborough and operated by Amadeus Aviation. This was the first crash and hull loss involving the AW169.

== Investigation ==
The Air Accidents Investigation Branch (AAIB) opened an investigation into the accident. Italy's Agenzia Nazionale per la Sicurezza del Volo, representing the state of the manufacturer of the helicopter, and Canada's Transportation Safety Board, representing the state of the manufacturer of the helicopter's engines, provided assistance. Accredited representatives from Poland's State Commission on Aircraft Accidents Investigation and Thailand's Aircraft Accident Investigation Committee also provided assistance. America's National Transportation Safety Board, representing the state of the manufacturer of the tail rotor actuator, and the French Bureau d'Enquêtes et d'Analyses pour la Sécurité de l'Aviation Civile, representing the state of the manufacturer of the tail rotor bearing, also assisted. The aircraft's Digital Flight Data Recorder was recovered on 28 October, having been severely damaged in the fire. It was transported to the AAIB's base at Farnborough, Hampshire, for downloading of its data. The wreckage of the helicopter was transported to Farnborough on 2 November.

A coroner's inquest was convened to investigate the official cause of death for the passengers and crew of the helicopter. The investigation reported in the court revealed that there was minimal opportunity for any individuals who survived the initial crash to escape, or for anyone to help those trapped. The inquest concluded in January 2025 with a verdict of accidental death for all five victims.

On 7 November, the European Aviation Safety Agency (EASA) issued an Airworthiness Directive, demanding checks of the tails of all AgustaWestland AW169 and AgustaWestland AW189 helicopters, as a precautionary measure. On 14 November, the AAIB released a Special Bulletin, outlining the progress of the investigation. A loss of yaw control was revealed as the cause of the aircraft crashing, with the reasons for the loss of yaw control not yet determined. On 30 November, the EASA issued an Emergency Alert Service Bulletin requiring periodic inspection of part of the tail rotor system. This was made mandatory by an Airworthiness Directive issued the same day.

On 6 December 2018, the AAIB published a second Special Bulletin. Investigators revealed that loss of control of the helicopter resulted from the tail rotor actuator control shaft (which controls the pitch of the tail rotor blades) becoming disconnected from the actuator lever mechanism that transmits the pilots' pedal inputs to control the helicopter's yaw. They have also revealed evidence of the normally stationary control shaft being spun by the tail rotor which caused the castellated nut holding the actuator lever in place to friction weld to its carrier, shear off its split pin and rotate off the threaded shaft. The locking nut and pin carrier were found loose in the tail rotor fairing and were bonded together. A duplex bearing that was designed to allow the control shaft to remain stationary (with the rest of the tail rotor assembly rotating around it) was found to only allow a few degrees of rotation, with the races blocked up by a mix of burnt grease and metallic particles. The AAIB published their two volume final report on 6 September 2023. Eight safety recommendations were made.

== Responses ==
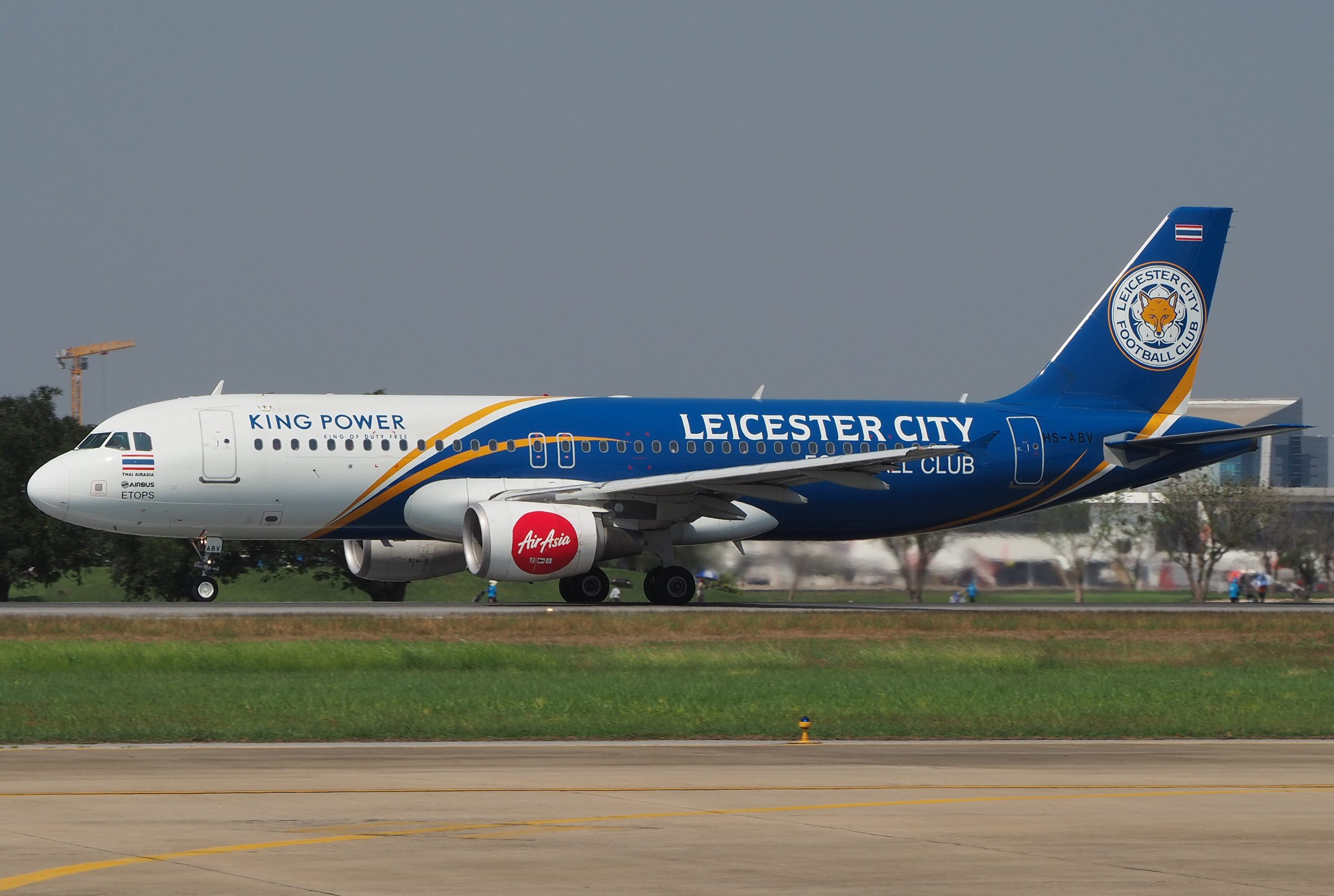
Leicester City F.C. delegation in Thai AirAsia livery took off at the Don Mueang International Airport, to attend the memorial service of Vichai.

Fans began to lay flowers and football shirts outside the stadium the morning after the crash. Shirts and scarves from other teams including West Ham United, Leicester City's opponent in the match prior to the crash, were also seen. On 30 October, Leicester City opened a book of condolence, with an online version also available. Some buildings were floodlit in blue as a tribute to the victims, including England's national stadium, Wembley.

The club's official charity The Foxes Foundation was renamed The Vichai Srivaddhanaprabha Foundation.

On 10 November thousands of Leicester City fans took part in a '5,000-1' walk in remembrance of the victims, before Leicester City played Burnley at home. The initial appeal was for 5,000 fans to take part, though reports suggested the number was about 10,000.

Leicester City established a memorial garden on the site of the crash.

=== Football ===
The 2018–19 FA Women's Championship match between Leicester City and Manchester United, scheduled for the day after the crash, was postponed. The women's reserve league match against Derby County, Leicester City's EFL Cup fixture against Southampton, which had been scheduled to take place at the King Power Stadium on 30 October, the Premier League International Cup fixture between Leicester City U-23s and Feyenoord Academy and the Belgian First Division B fixture between Oud-Heverlee Leuven, the second club owned by Vichai Srivaddhanaprabha, and Lommel, originally scheduled for 31 October, were all also postponed.

At the Premier League fixtures held on the next day, players wore black armbands and held a minute's silence for the crash victims. Another observance took place in the fixtures the following weekend for the victims, as well as for the upcoming Remembrance Day.

The NFL London series match between the Philadelphia Eagles and Jacksonville Jaguars taking place at Wembley stadium the day after the crash included a pre-game tribute in memory of victims of both the Leicester crash and the Pittsburgh synagogue shooting which occurred on the same day.

=== Litigation ===
On 26 October 2021, the families of the pilots launched a legal case at the District Court of Massachusetts in the United States, suing Raytheon for damages. The family alleged that Raytheon "negligently designed, manufactured, assembled and sold the Tail Rotor Actuator such that the Accident Aircraft's Tail Rotor Actuator control shaft was subject to disconnection from the actuator lever mechanism".

In January 2025, the Srivaddhanaprabha family announced that they were suing Leonardo for £2.15 billion for loss of earnings and other damages.
