= Oud-Heverlee Leuven =

Association football club in Belgium

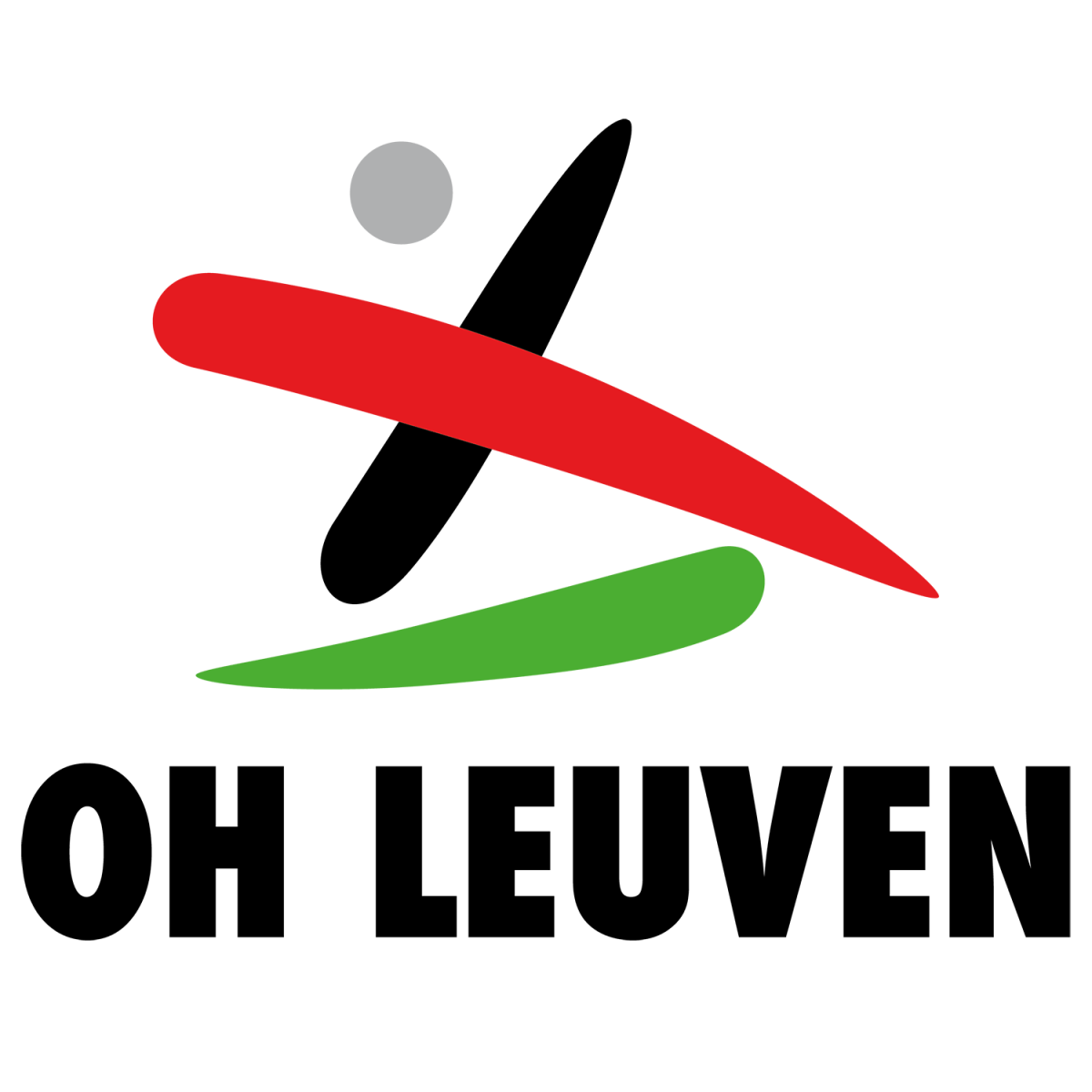
- Full name: Oud-Heverlee Leuven
- Short name: OHL, OH Leuven
- Founded: 2002; 24 years ago
- Ground: Den Dreef
- Capacity: 10,020
- Owner: King Power
- Chairman: Aiyawatt Srivaddhanaprabha
- Head coach: Timmy Simons
- League: Belgian Pro League
- 2025–26: Belgian Pro League, 12th of 16
- Website: ohleuven.com
Home colours	Away colours

Oud-Heverlee Leuven (Flemish pronunciation: [ʌut ˈɦeːvərˌleː ˈløːvə(n)]), also called OH Leuven or OHL, is a Belgian professional football club from the city of Leuven. It was created in 2002 from the merger of three clubs, F.C. Zwarte Duivels Oud-Heverlee, whose registration number it inherited, Daring Club Leuven, and Stade Leuven. The club's home ground is Den Dreef, located in Heverlee. The club currently plays in the country's first division, the Belgian Pro League.

== History ==
F.C. Zwarte Duivels Oud-Heverlee was founded in 1957, climbing out of the provincial leagues in 1996 and winning the Belgian Fourth Division title during the 1999–2000 season. Promoted to the Belgian Third Division they joined their Leuven neighbours Stade Leuven, founded in 1905, which had played over 30 seasons in the Belgian Second Division and one year in the First in the 1949–50 season. As of 2002, F.C. Zwarte Duivels Oud-Heverlee was in bad financial shape, moving up and down between third and fourth division since 1991.

In 2002, the city of Leuven decided that both Third division teams, Zwarte Duivels Oud-Heverlee and K. Stade Leuven, would merge also with the third club from Leuven, K. Daring Club Leuven, which was at that time playing at the fifth level of the league. Daring Club Leuven was founded in 1922, had played several seasons in the Belgian Second Division, and after being the leading club from the Leuven region between 1958 and 1964, had dropped down into the provincial leagues in 1979 and stayed there since. The new club took over the registration of Zwarte Duivels Oud-Heverlee, and started playing in the Belgian Third Division under the name Oud-Heverlee Leuven.

At the end of its first season, the club narrowly lost out on promotion, going down on penalty kicks to Eendracht Aalst in the Third division play-off final, after finishing 2nd in the 3rd division B, 5 points behind champions Tubize. After a 3rd place in the same division in season 2003–04, Oud-Heverlee Leuven finished 2nd once again in season 2004–05 and this time they did win the promotion play-off and entered the second division in the 2005–06 season. After two seasons finishing 6th and 5th, OH Leuven finished 3rd in the 2007–08 Belgian Second Division season with 61 points. This allowed them to take part in the promotion playoffs where the team finished as the bottom 4th after losing all six games to Tubize, Antwerp, and Lommel United.

Two seasons with the team finishing 9th and 14th were followed by a second division title on Sunday 24 April 2011, when Oud-Heverlee Leuven secured the 2010–11 2nd division championship and gained promotion to the First division for the season 2011–12, following a 2–2 draw at Antwerp. The team rounded off the season the following Sunday with a 2–0 home win against Lommel United, gathering a total of 73 points from 34 games and finishing 8 points ahead of 2nd placed Lommel United. Their promotion brought First division football to the city of Leuven for the first time since the 1949–50 season, when Stade Leuven had finished bottom of the league and were relegated.

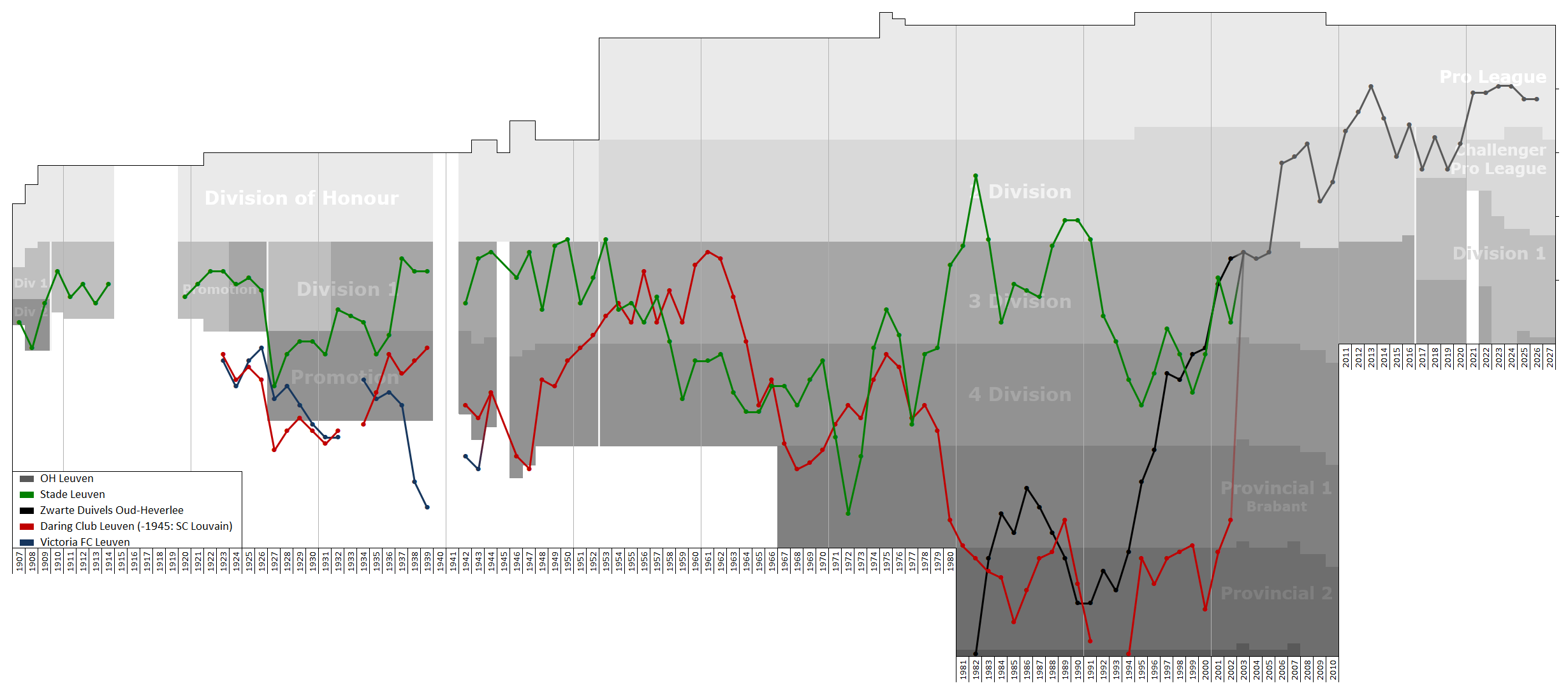
Historical league performance chart of OH Leuven and its predecessors

OH Leuven secured its top flight status following a 0–0 draw at home against Lierse on 3 March 2012, marking the first time a team from the city of Leuven managed to remain at the highest level of Belgian football for more than a single season. In the 2013–14 season, OH Leuven was relegated after losing the 2014 promotion/relegation play-offs. Although finishing 6th, the team was promoted next year via the 2015 promotion/relegation play-offs, but it was immediately relegated again after finishing last in the 2015–16 season.

In September 2016, OH Leuven were caught up in a scandal affecting football in England. In relation to allegations made against individuals within English football, OH Leuven chairman Jimmy Houtput was alleged to have offered up the club as a "conduit" to allow third-party companies to gain ownership of football players in England. Houtput claimed he was "merely trying to obtain the identity of the possible investor(s) and would never take part in illegal activities to circumvent the third-party ownership", but subsequently resigned as OH Leuven chairman on 30 September.

Later that season, with the club struggling financially, OH Leuven was taken over by the Thai duty-free retailer King Power, led by chairman and CEO Vichai Srivaddhanaprabha, who already owned Leicester City.

In July 2018, OH Leuven reclaimed the registration number that originally belonged to K. Stade Leuven, to "reclaim the glorious past", thus dropping registration number 6142 (originally belonging to F.C. Zwarte Duivels Oud-Heverlee) and reverting to 18.

On 27 October 2018, the club's chairman, Vichai, died in a helicopter crash following Leicester City's home match against West Ham United.

=== Evolution throughout the league ===
Green denotes the highest level of football in Belgium; yellow the second highest; red the third highest.

== Honours ==
- Belgian Second Division
  - Winners (1): 2010–11
- Belgian Second Division play-offs
  - Winners (1): 2015

== Kit and colours ==
Upon its foundation in 2002, white was chosen as the club color, with the logo of the new club combining the green of Stade Leuven, the black of Zwarte Duivels Oud-Heverlee and the red of Daring Leuven. Throughout the years, the home shirt has remained white, often decorated with a few red or green stripes or colored sleeves. The away shirt color has alternated mostly between red and green but has been black, yellow and blue as well.

=== Shirt sponsors and manufacturers ===
Seasons	Kit manufacturer	Shirt sponsor
2002–03	(Germany) Erima	Speedy
2003–06	(Germany) Erima	Vandezande
2006–08	(Germany) Erima	Option
2008–15	(Belgium) Vermarc	Option
2015–16	(Belgium) Vermarc	Just Eat
2016–17	(Belgium) Vermarc	Leuven Klimaatneutraal 2030
2017–19	(Belgium) Vermarc	King Power
2019–22	(Germany) Adidas	King Power
2022–25	(Netherlands) Stanno	Starcasino (until end of 2024) one.com (from 2025)
2025–26	(Netherlands) Stanno	Starsport TV
2026–	(Germany) Jako	Starsport TV

== Stadium ==
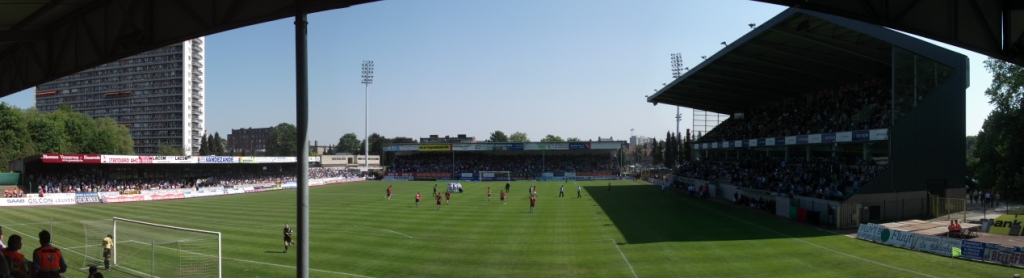
Den Dreef Stadium (before the expansions to the main stand (right) and construction of a same stand on the opposite side (left).)

Their stadium is called Stadion Den Dreef and is situated on Kardinaal Mercierlaan in the south Leuven suburb of Heverlee (not to be confused with 'Oud-Heverlee' in the club name, which is in fact a separate municipality). The entrance for visiting fans is on Tervuursevest.

== Players ==
=== First-team squad ===
As of 14 September 2026

Note: Flags indicate national team as defined under FIFA eligibility rules; some limited exceptions apply. Players may hold more than one non-FIFA nationality.

No.	Pos.	Nation	Player
1	GK	NED	Dani van den Heuvel
3	DF	BEL	Noë Dussenne
4	MF	BEL	Birger Verstraete
5	DF	GER	Jamie Lawrence
6	MF	BEL	Wouter George
7	MF	GHA	Emmanuel Addai
8	MF	BEL	Siebe Schrijvers
9	FW	GUI	Abdoul Karim Traoré
10	FW	BEL	Thibaud Verlinden
11	FW	GER	Henok Teklab
13	GK	BEL	Kiany Vroman
15	DF	CRO	Viktor Damjanić
17	FW	BEL	Kyan Vaesen
18	FW	BEL	Robin Mirisola (on loan from Genk)
19	FW	NGR	Chukwubuikem Ikwuemesi
20	FW	JPN	Shin Yamada (on loan from Celtic)
21	FW	COD	William Balikwisha

No.	Pos.	Nation	Player
24	MF	POL	Łukasz Łakomy
25	MF	BEL	Manuel Osifo
26	DF	JPN	Takuya Ogiwara (on loan from Urawa Red Diamonds)
27	DF	ESP	Óscar Gil
28	DF	BEL	Ewoud Pletinckx
30	DF	ITA	Alessandro Fontanarosa (on loan from Avellino)
34	DF	SUI	Roggerio Nyakossi
42	MF	TUR	Hasan Bulut
48	MF	USA	Bryang Kayo
61	GK	BEL	Owen Jochmans
63	DF	BEL	Christ Souanga
72	MF	BEL	Sebastian Murru
77	DF	BEL	Thibault Vlietinck
80	MF	BEL	Matteo Heremans
81	GK	BEL	Marcel Van Dijck
89	FW	BEL	Chike Van De Ven
99	DF	BEL	Davis Opoku

=== Under-23 squad ===
As of 10 September 2026

Note: Flags indicate national team as defined under FIFA eligibility rules; some limited exceptions apply. Players may hold more than one non-FIFA nationality.

No.	Pos.	Nation	Player
43	DF	IRL	Liam McAlinney
45	GK	BEL	Keano Dekeyser
47	DF	BEL	Orin Reinat
50	MF	BEL	Steve Likebeli
51	MF	BEL	Aboubacar Conte
53	DF	HUN	Dániel Kovács
55	DF	BEL	Oscar Olivier
59	MF	BEL	Kristen Ngandimoun
60	MF	BEL	Yassine Azzouz
61	GK	BEL	Owen Jochmans
64	DF	BEL	Mathéo Gérard
66	DF	BEL	Anthony Willems
67	FW	BEL	Amadou Diallo
70	MF	BEL	Ryane Redouane

No.	Pos.	Nation	Player
71	DF	BEL	Olsen Djédjé
73	DF	BEL	Yann Sikorski
76	DF	BEL	Tijn Janssen
78	MF	BEL	Femi Siwoku
79	FW	BEL	Lukas Cakoni
82	MF	BEL	Victor Vanden Driessche
84	DF	BEL	Daan Braspenning
85	DF	BEL	Lucca Darcon
88	MF	BEL	Jahir Da Costa
90	FW	BEL	Mohamed Amine Moustache
91	GK	BEL	Luwe Van Looy
93	DF	BEL	Milan Gigot
96	DF	BEL	Aaron Wiggers
97	FW	BEL	Iliano Remans

== Club staff ==
As of 29 July 2026

Directors & Senior Management
Role	Person
Chairman	Aiyawatt Srivaddhanaprabha
Vice chairman	Apichet Srivaddhanaprabha
Directors	Susan Whelan; Jon Rudkin
Technical Director	György Csepregi
Chief Executive Officer	Frédéric Van den Steen
Chief Commercial Officer	Frederik Vancauteren
Head of Operations	Peter Onkelinkx

First Team Management
Role	Person
Head coach	Timmy Simons
Assistant Coaches	Jamath Shoffner; Tibor Balog
Goalkeeping Coach	Bram Verbist
Performance Coach	Tuur Vanderstukken
U23 Transition Coach	Derrick Tshimanga
Video Analyst	Mehdi Hosseinpour
First Team Doctor	Ignace Verscheure
Physiotherapists	Michiel Devyver; Kylian Lénaers; Mathias Mariën
Strength & Conditioning Coach	Matthias De Baerdemaeker
Team Manager	Nicolas Cornu
Equipment Manager	Jens Dormaels
Nutritionist	Fleur Gentry

== Managers ==
- (Belgium) Jean-Pierre Vande Velde (2002–2004)
- (Belgium) Guido Brepoels (2004–2007)
- (Belgium) Rudi Cossey (2007 – 27 August 2008)
- (Belgium) Marc Wuyts (27 August 2008 – 3 March 2009)
- (Belgium) Jean-Pierre Vande Velde (4 March 2009 – 2010)
- (Belgium) Ronny Van Geneugden (2010 – 21 January 2014)
- (Belgium) Herman Vermeulen (21 January 2014 – 25 February 2014)
- (Croatia) Ivan Leko (25 February 2014 – 28 November 2014)
- (Belgium) Hans Vander Elst ^{(caretaker)} (28 November 2014 – 26 December 2014)
- (Belgium) Jacky Mathijssen (26 December 2014 – 24 November 2015)
- (Belgium) Emilio Ferrera (26 November 2015 – 15 January 2017)
- (Netherlands) Dennis van Wijk (19 January 2017 – 22 September 2017)
- (England) Nigel Pearson (22 September 2017 – 3 February 2019)
- (Belgium) Vincent Euvrard (8 February 2019 – 9 June 2020)
- (Belgium) Marc Brys (16 June 2020 – 13 October 2023) (Note: Sven Swinnen took his place on the bench as caretaker manager for the match on 4 February 2023.)
- (Belgium) Eddy Vanhemel ^{(caretaker)} (13 October 2023 – 5 November 2023)
- (Spain) Óscar García (5 November 2023 – 22 November 2024)
- (Belgium) Hans Somers ^{(caretaker)} (22 November 2024 – 1 December 2024)
- (Wales) Chris Coleman (2 December 2024 – 11 June 2025) (Note: Due to a delay in receiving a work permit, Somers also still took charge of the cup match on 4 December 2024, though de-facto Coleman was the manager already.)
- (Belgium) David Hubert (16 June 2025 – 13 October 2025)
- (Belgium) Hans Somers ^{(caretaker)} (13 October 2025 – 26 October 2025)
- (Belgium) Felice Mazzù (26 October 2025 – 27 May 2026)
- (Belgium) Timmy Simons (23 June 2026 – )

== Former players ==
=== Top goal scorers ===
The following list the top scorers for OH Leuven per season, counting only goals scored during official matches: league, cup and playoffs.

Player	Goals	Season
(Guinea) Sory Kaba	9	2025–26
(Belgium) Siebe Schrijvers	8	2024–25
(France) Youssef Maziz	8	2023–24
(Spain) Mario González	15	2022–23
(Guinea) Sory Kaba	12	2021–22
(France) Thomas Henry	21	2020–21
(France) Thomas Henry	16	2019–20
(France) Frédéric Duplus and (Belgium) Mathieu Maertens	7	2018–19
(Benin) Yannick Aguemon	13	2017–18
(Belgium) Esteban Casagolda	8	2016–17
(France) Yohan Croizet and (Belgium) Leandro Trossard	9	2015–16
(North Macedonia) Jovan Kostovski	14	2014–15
(Belgium) Bjorn Ruytinx	11	2013–14
(The Gambia) Ibou	19	2012–13
(Belgium) Jordan Remacle	16	2011–12
(Tunisia) Hamdi Harbaoui	28	2010–11
(France) Cédric Bétrémieux	13	2009–10
(Belgium) Frederik Vanderbiest	9	2008–09
(Belgium) Toni Brogno and (Belgium) Bjorn Ruytinx	16	2007–08
(Belgium) Toni Brogno	14	2006–07
(Belgium) Samuel Remy	14	2005–06
(Belgium) François Sterchele	32	2004–05
(Belgium) Kristof De Voeght	15	2003–04
(Belgium) Hans Goethuys	12	2002–03

=== Internationals ===
The list below consists of current and former players of OH Leuven who have gained caps for their national team.

Flags indicate national teams they played for.
Only players obtaining first team caps are included, U21 or unofficial matches are not.

- (Algeria) Ahmed Touba
- (Austria) Raphael Holzhauser
- (Belgium) Logan Bailly
- (Belgium) Toni Brogno
- (Belgium) Mark De Man
- (Belgium) Karel Geraerts
- (Belgium) David Hubert
- (Belgium) Thomas Kaminski
- (Belgium) Mandela Keita
- (Belgium) Marvin Ogunjimi
- (Belgium) Kevin Roelandts
- (Belgium) Jeroen Simaeys
- (Belgium) François Sterchele
- (Belgium) Leandro Trossard
- (Belgium) Derrick Tshimanga
- (Belgium) Birger Verstraete
- (Benin) Yannick Aguemon
- (Bosnia and Herzegovina) Muhamed Subašić
- (Bulgaria) Ivan Bandalovski
- (Bulgaria) Kristiyan Malinov
- (Burkina Faso) Dylan Ouédraogo
- (Cameroon) Serge Tabekou
- (Canada) Tristan Borges
- (Croatia) Filip Benković (Note: Although Benković never played an official match for OH Leuven, he was part of the squad for the second half of the 2020–21 season and is hence counted as a former OH Leuven player.)
- (Curaçao) Romero Regales
- (Curaçao) Joshua Zimmerman (Note: Although Zimmerman never played an official match for OH Leuven, he was part of the squad for the 2022–23 season and is hence counted as a former OH Leuven player.)
- (Czech Republic) Václav Jemelka
- (Democratic Republic of the Congo) William Balikwisha
- (Democratic Republic of the Congo) Ezechiel Banzuzi
- (Democratic Republic of the Congo) Ibrahim Somé
- (Finland) Casper Terho
- (The Gambia) Ibou
- (Georgia (country)) Levan Shengelia
- (Ghana) (Belgium) Denis Odoi (Note: Odoi gained A-caps both for Belgium as well as Ghana.)
- (Ghana) Kamal Sowah
- (Guinea) Sory Kaba
- (Guinea) Abdoul Karim Traoré
- (Hungary) Barnabás Bese
- (Iceland) Stefán Gíslason
- (Iceland) Rúnar Alex Rúnarsson
- (Iceland) Jón Dagur Þorsteinsson
- (Iran) Kaveh Rezaei
- (Israel) Raz Shlomo
- (Ivory Coast) Mamadou Bagayoko
- (Ivory Coast) Copa (Note: Although Copa never played an official match for OH Leuven, he was part of the squad for the 2017–18 season and is hence counted as a former OH Leuven player.)
- (Japan) Kento Misao
- (Japan) Takuma Ominami
- (Japan) Shin Yamada
- (Jordan) Musa Al-Taamari
- (Madagascar) Scotty Sadzoute (Note: Although Sadzoute never played an official match for OH Leuven, he was part of the squad for the first half of the 2021–22 season and is hence counted as a former OH Leuven player.)
- (Malaysia) Dion Cools
- (Martinique) Mickaël Biron
- (Morocco) Sofian Chakla
- (Morocco) Hamza Mendyl
- (Niger) Konan N'Dri
- (Nigeria) Cyriel Dessers
- (Nigeria) Azubuike Oliseh
- (North Macedonia) Jovan Kostovski
- (Poland) Bartosz Kapustka
- (Scotland) George Hirst
- (Scotland) Tony Watt
- (Serbia) Stefan Mitrović
- (Serbia) Slobodan Urošević
- (South Africa) Darren Keet
- (Spain) Óscar Gil
- (Switzerland) Roggerio Nyakossi
- (Thailand) Suphanat Mueanta
- (Thailand) Kawin Thamsatchanan
- (Togo) Samuel Asamoah
- (Tunisia) Hamdi Harbaoui
- (Turkey) Cenk Özkacar
- (Ukraine) Oleksandr Iakovenko
- (Uruguay) Federico Ricca
- (Venezuela) Rafael Romo
- (Wales) Andy King
- (Zimbabwe) Ovidy Karuru

=== Internationals by Confederation ===
Member associations are listed in order of most to least amount of current and former OH Leuven players represented Internationally

Total national team players by confederation
Confederation	Total	(Nation) Association
AFC	8	Japan (3), Thailand (2), Iran (1), Jordan (1), Malaysia (1)
CAF	24	Democratic Republic of the Congo (3), Ghana (2), Guinea (2), Ivory Coast (2), Morocco (2), Nigeria (2), Algeria (1), Benin (1), Burkina Faso (1), Cameroon (1), Madagascar (1), Niger (1), South Africa (1), The Gambia (1), Togo (1), Tunisia (1), Zimbabwe (1)
CONCACAF	4	Curaçao (2), Canada (1), Martinique (1)
CONMEBOL	2	Uruguay (1), Venezuela (1)
OFC	0	
UEFA	39	Belgium (15), Iceland (3), Bulgaria (2), Scotland (2), Serbia (2), Austria (1), Bosnia and Herzegovina (1), Croatia (1), Czech Republic (1), Finland (1), (Georgia (country)) Georgia (1), Hungary (1), Israel (1), North Macedonia (1), Poland (1), Spain (1), Switzerland (1), Turkey (1), Ukraine (1), Wales (1)
