= Aridani Arbelo =

Spanish footballer

Aridani
Personal information
- Full name: Aridani Arbelo Santana
- Date of birth: 8 March 1980 (age 46)
- Place of birth: Las Palmas, Spain
- Height: 1.83 m (6 ft 0 in)
- Position: Left-back

Youth career
- Tenerife

Senior career*
Years	Team	Apps	(Gls)
1999–2000	Tenerife B		
2000	Tenerife	3	(0)
2000–2002	Vecindario	47	(2)
2002–2003	Pájara Playas	29	(0)
2003–2004	Las Palmas	3	(0)
2004–2005	Pájara Playas	30	(0)
2005–2006	Leganés	21	(0)
2006–2007	Orientación Marítima	23	(1)
2007–2008	Toledo	32	(5)
2008–2009	Linares	13	(2)
2009	Santa Brígida	9	(1)
2009–2010	Conqense	29	(0)
2010–2011	Puertollano	32	(0)
2011–2012	Castellón	17	(0)
2012	Villarrubia	6	(1)
2012–2014	Conquense	53	(6)
2015	Marino	8	(0)
2015–2016	Unión Viera		
2016–2018	Arucas		
- * Club domestic league appearances and goals

Aridani Arbelo Santana (born 8 March 1980), known as Aridani, is a Spanish former professional footballer who played as a left-back.

== Career ==
Born in Las Palmas, Canary Islands, Aridani graduated from local CD Tenerife's youth system, making his senior debuts with the reserves in the 1999–2000 season, in the Tercera División. On 14 May 2000 he made his professional debut, starting in a 0–0 home draw against CD Leganés in the Segunda División championship.

After appearing with UD Vecindario and UD Pájara Playas de Jandía in the Segunda División B, Aridani signed with second-tier UD Las Palmas in August 2003. However, after featuring sparingly with the Canarians, he returned to his previous club in the following summer.

In the following seasons Aridani competed in the third and fourth tiers, representing CD Leganés, CD Orientación Marítima, CD Toledo, CD Linares, UD Villa de Santa Brígida, UB Conquense (two stints), CD Puertollano, CD Castellón and Villarrubia CF.
