= Sergei Kudryavtsev (footballer) =

Russian footballer

Personal information
- Full name: Sergei Viktorovich Kudryavtsev
- Date of birth: 26 November 1980 (age 45)
- Height: 1.70 m (5 ft 7 in)
- Position: Forward

Youth career
- Torpedo Vladimir

Senior career*
Years	Team	Apps	(Gls)
1998–1999	Torpedo Vladimir	28	(3)
2000–2001	Svetotekhnika Saransk	27	(3)
2002	Lokomotiv Nizhny Novgorod	6	(2)
2003	Znamya Truda Orekhovo-Zuyevo	31	(3)
2004	Slavia Mozyr	8	(0)
2007	Energiya Shatura	21	(3)
2008	Znamya Truda Orekhovo-Zuyevo	3	(0)
- * Club domestic league appearances and goals

Sergei Viktorovich Kudryavtsev (Russian: Серге́й Викторович Кудрявцев; born 26 November 1980) is a former Russian professional footballer.
