= Tuda Murphy =

Personal information
- Full name: Tuda Murphy
- Date of birth: 4 November 1980 (age 45)
- Place of birth: George Town, Grand Cayman, Cayman Islands
- Height: 6 ft 4 in (1.93 m)
- Position: Goalkeeper

Senior career*
Years	Team	Apps	(Gls)
1996–2001	George Town SC		
2001–2002	Naya Sporting	16	(0)
2002–2004	King College Tornado		
2004–2006	Lee Flames		
2006–2007	Bodden Town	6	(0)
2007	Donegal Celtic	0	(0)
2007–2010	Glenavon	47	(0)
2010	Bodden Town	0	(0)
2011–2013	Portadown	22	(0)
2013–2014	Dungannon Swifts	5	(0)
2014–2015	Loughgall		(0)
2015–2017	Banbridge Town		(0)
2018	PSNI	3	(0)
2019	Portadown	1	(0)

International career
2002–2008	Cayman Islands	7	(0)
- * Club domestic league appearances and goals

Tuda Murphy (born 4 November 1980) is a Caymanian footballer. Besides Cayman Islands, he has played in Northern Ireland.

== International career ==
He also won numbers of caps for Cayman Islands, and most recently the World Cup qualifier match, draw with Bermuda on 3 February 2008 and 1–3 lost in return legs.

#	Date	Venue	Opponent	Result	Competition
1.	27 November 2002	Truman Bodden, George Town, Cayman Islands	Cuba	0–5	Gold Cup Qualifying
2.	29 November 2002	Truman Bodden, George Town, Cayman Islands	Dominican Republic	0–1	Gold Cup Qualifying
3.	1 December 2002	Truman Bodden, George Town, Cayman Islands	Martinique	3–0	Gold Cup Qualifying
4.	3 February 2008	National Stadium, Hamilton, Bermuda	Bermuda	1–1	World Cup Qualifiers
5.	30 March 2008	Truman Bodden, George Town, Cayman Islands	Bermuda	1–3	World Cup Qualifiers
6.	30 August 2008	Truman Bodden, George Town, Cayman Islands	Antigua and Barbuda	1–1	Caribbean Championship
7.	31 August 2008	Truman Bodden, George Town, Cayman Islands	Bermuda	0–0	Caribbean Championship

== Honours ==
- Nigel O'Hara Diamond Jewellers Player of the Month:1

November 2009

- Alan Steele Player of the Season Award:1

2008

- William Walker Award:1

2008

- Stewards Award:1

2008
