= The Moving Museum =

The Moving Museum is a not-for-profit organisation that runs a nomadic programme of contemporary art exhibitions. It has held projects in Dubai, Istanbul, and London comprising large-scale exhibitions, artist residencies, public programming, publishing, artwork commissions, and digital programming.

Artists are invited through a collaborative curatorial model composed of contributors from various disciplines and are included in diverse ways: as producers, collaborators, curators, and advisors. Over 50 new projects have been commissioned across a wide range of media including works by Amalia Ulman, Broomberg and Chanarin, Clunie Reid, Hannah Perry, Hito Steyerl, Jeremy Deller, Jon Rafman, Jeremy Bailey, James Bridle, Michael Rakowitz, Tom Sachs, Ryan Gander, Mai-Thu Perret, Slavs and Tatars, Zach Blas, Anne de Vries, Ben Schumacher, Ming Wong and Lucky PDF.

The Moving Museum is an independent and non-political organization founded by Aya Mousawi and Simon Sakhai in 2012; a registered community interest company (CIC) in England and Wales; and a registered 501(c)(3) Charity in the United States of America. The organisation's website was designed by new media artist Jeremy Bailey with Harm van den Dorpel, Joe Hamilton, and Jonas Lund.
