= Marcin Makuch =

Polish footballer (born 1980)

Personal information
- Full name: Marcin Makuch
- Date of birth: 3 April 1980 (age 46)
- Place of birth: Kraków, Poland
- Height: 1.77 m (5 ft 9 1/2 in)
- Position: Defender

Team information
- Current team: Wanda Kraków
- Number: 17

Senior career*
Years	Team	Apps	(Gls)
1999–2003	Hutnik Kraków		
2003–2004	Cracovia	30	(5)
2005	Podbeskidzie Bielsko-Biała	24	(3)
2006–2007	Ruch Chorzów	38	(0)
2007–2008	Kmita Zabierzów	37	(0)
2009–2015	Sandecja Nowy Sącz	177	(4)
2015–2016	Skawinka Skawina		
2016–2018	Hutnik Kraków		
2018–2019	Wieczysta Kraków	36	(0)
2020–2024	Wieczysta Kraków II	79	(10)
2024–	Wanda Kraków	12	(0)
- * Club domestic league appearances and goals as of 21 December 2024

Marcin Makuch (born 3 April 1980) is a Polish footballer who plays as a defender for Wanda Kraków.

== Honours ==
Ruch Chorzów

- II liga: 2006–07

Hutnik Kraków

- IV liga Lesser Poland West: 2017–18
- Polish Cup (Kraków County regionals): 2017–18
- Polish Cup (Kraków City regionals): 2017–18

Wieczysta Kraków

- Polish Cup (Kraków City regionals): 2019–20

Wieczysta Kraków II

- V liga Lesser Poland West: 2023–24
- Regional league Kraków II: 2022–23
- Klasa A Kraków III: 2021–22
- Klasa B Kraków III: 2020–21
- Polish Cup (Kraków County regionals): 2022–23
