= Marc Wuyts =

Belgian football coach and former player

Personal information
- Date of birth: 12 September 1967 (age 59)
- Place of birth: Brussels, Belgium
- Position: Forward

Youth career
- 1976–1979: Olympic Stockel
- 1979–1986: Anderlecht

Senior career*
Years	Team	Apps	(Gls)
1986–1989	Anderlecht	17	(1)
1989–1990	KRC Mechelen	27	(5)
1990–1993	Charleroi	77	(14)
1993–1996	RWDM	82	(20)
1996–1998	Sint-Truiden	48	(15)
1998–2000	Mouscron	19	(4)
2000	La Louvière	19	(3)
2000–2002	RWDM	13	(1)
2004–2005	Tournai	1	(0)

Managerial career
- 2001–2002: RWDM (assistant)
- 2005–2006: Tournai
- 2006–2008: Namur
- 2008: Visé
- 2008–2009: OH Leuven
- 2011–2012: Union SG (youth)
- 2012–2013: Union SG
- 2013–: Union SG (youth coordinator)
- * Club domestic league appearances and goals

Marc Wuyts (born 12 September 1967) is a Belgian former football player and coach who is currently youth coordinator at Union SG.

Wuyts started his career with Anderlecht where he joined the first team at 19 years of age, playing alongside Luc Nilis and Franky Vercauteren. His first match came against Bayern Munich in the 1986–87 European Cup when he was subbed in after 58 minutes to replace Pier Janssen. Later that season he also played a few minutes in a league match. The season thereafter was supposed to be his breakthrough, however he did not play a single minute. He remained with Anderlecht however and received more playing opportunities in his third season, starting 5 times and coming on from the bench 11 times. That season he also scored his first and only goal for the team. Following that season he moved to KRC Mechelen for the 1989-1990 season where he became part of the standard lineup and scored 5 goals. As Mechelen relegated, he moved to Charleroi where again he was a regular under Georges Heylens. When Heylens was replaced with Robert Waseige in 1992, Wuyts often ended up on the bench, causing him to move to RWDM in 1993.

At RWDM he stayed three seasons until 1996 before moving to Sint-Truiden where he played two seasons before moving to Mouscron, his last team in the First Division. He then joined Second Division team La Louvière in 2000 and immediately helped them to achieve promotion in their first season. He remained in the Second Division however as he rejoined RWDM where he was mostly an unused sub and witnessed the team also achieving promotion in 2001. He stayed one more season with the team at the highest level before retiring. However two seasons later when he was coaching Tournai in the Belgian Fourth Division, he played one more match to help out his team.

Following a long career as a player with several teams in Belgium, Wuyts was less successful as a manager, managing mainly in the lower divisions. In 2008, he was appointed head coach at Oud-Heverlee Leuven in the Belgian Second Division, however following bad results he was sacked in March 2009 and has not managed in the top levels since.
