= Sergei Sholokhov =

Russian footballer

Personal information
- Full name: Sergei Aleksandrovich Sholokhov
- Date of birth: 6 September 1980 (age 46)
- Height: 1.73 m (5 ft 8 in)
- Positions: Defender; midfielder

Youth career
- APZ-20 Kursk

Senior career*
Years	Team	Apps	(Gls)
1998–2013	FC Avangard Kursk	324	(1)
- * Club domestic league appearances and goals

Sergei Aleksandrovich Sholokhov (Russian: Серге́й Александрович Шолохов; born 6 September 1980) is a former Russian professional football player. Before 2004 he was known as Sergei Kocherga (Russian: Серге́й Кочерга).

== Club career ==
He played 4 seasons in the Russian Football National League for FC Avangard Kursk.
