= Stade Leuven =

Belgian football club

K. Stade Leuven
- Full name: Koninklijke Stade Leuven
- Founded: 12 November 1903; 122 years ago as "R. Stade Louvaniste"
- Dissolved: 2002; 24 years ago (merged into OH Leuven)
- League: Belgian third division, group B
- 2001: 6th
| Home colours | Away colours |

Koninklijke Stade Leuven was a Belgian football club from the city of Leuven, Flemish Brabant that existed between 1903 and 2002.

== History ==
The club was founded as Stade Louvaniste and wore the matricule n°18. It was admitted to the first season ever of the second division in 1910–11. It left the second division in 1949 to play in the first division for one season. The club was eventually relegated to the third division in 1953. It played in the second division again from 1981 to 1983 and from 1988 to 1991. In 2002 K. Stade Leuven as it was named since 1967 merged with F.C. Zwarte Duivels Oud-Heverlee (Zwarte Duivels means Black Devils) and Daring Club Leuven to become Oud-Heverlee Leuven with the matricule n°6142 of the "Black Devils".

Belgium national team player Dries Mertens, who is from Leuven, started his career at Stade Leuven as a boy.
