= 2023–24 Oud-Heverlee Leuven season =

Oud-Heverlee Leuven
2023–24 season
- Owner: King Power International Group
- Chairman: Aiyawatt Srivaddhanaprabha
- Manager: Marc Brys (until 13 October 2023); Eddy Vanhemel (13 October 2023 – 4 November 2023); Óscar García (since 5 November 2023)
- Stadium: Den Dreef
- Belgian Pro League: 10th
- Belgian Cup: Quarter-finals
- Top goalscorer: League: Youssef Maziz & Jón Dagur Þorsteinsson (7 goals); All: Youssef Maziz (8 goals)
Home colours	Away colours

The 2023–24 season was the 22nd season in the existence of Oud-Heverlee Leuven and its fourth consecutive season in the top flight of Belgian football. The club took part in the domestic league as well as the Belgian Cup.

By reaching the Quarter-finals of the Belgian Cup, the club equalled their best ever result, only reaching that stage once before. In the league, the club struggled all through the season, only jumping out of the relegation play-offs in the most dramatic fashion as Nachon Nsingi scored in the dying seconds of the final match of the regular season. In the Europe Play-offs, OH Leuven managed to overtake both Standard Liège and Westerlo to finish the season in 10th position, also their highest ever result.

== Players ==
- This section lists players who were in Oud-Heveree Leuven's first-team squad at any point during the 2023–24 season and appeared at least once on the match sheet (possibly as unused substitutes)
- The symbol ℒ indicates a player who is on loan from another club
- The symbol ¥ indicates a youngster

No.	Nationality	Name	Position	Joined First Team	Previous club	Left First Team
Goalkeepers
1	(Belgium)	Tobe Leysen	GK	19 August 2023	(Belgium) Genk	–
12	(Romania)	Valentin Cojocaru	GK	21 June 2022	(Ukraine) Dnipro-1	4 September 2023
16	(France)	Maxence Prévot	GK	13 August 2023	Sochaux	–
38	(Belgium)	Oregan Ravet^{¥}	GK	Summer 2019	Youth Squad	–
Defenders
3	(Israel)	Raz Shlomo	CB	3 July 2023	(Israel) Maccabi Netanya	2 February 2024
5	(Belgium) / (Democratic Republic of the Congo)	Pierre-Yves Ngawa	CB / RB	11 August 2019	(Italy) Perugia	–
6	(Belgium)	Joren Dom	RB	28 April 2022	(Belgium) Beerschot	–
14	(Uruguay) / (Italy)	Federico Ricca	CB	12 August 2022	(Belgium) Club Brugge	–
18	(France) / (Portugal)	Florian Miguel	LB	25 July 2023	(Spain) Huesca	–
20	(Morocco) / (Ivory Coast)	Hamza Mendyl	LB / LW	5 July 2022	(Germany) Schalke 04	–
23	(Belgium) / (Democratic Republic of the Congo)	Joël Schingtienne^{¥}	CB	Summer 2022	Youth Squad	–
24	(Argentina)	Franco Russo^{ℒ}	CB	1 February 2024	Ludogorets Razgrad	(30 June 2024)
28	(Belgium)	Ewoud Pletinckx	CB	17 June 2022	(Belgium) Zulte Waregem	–
30	(Japan)	Takahiro Akimoto^{ℒ}	LB / LW	20 January 2024	(Japan) Urawa Red Diamonds	(30 June 2024)
52	(Belgium) / (Angola)	Richie Sagrado^{¥}	RB	Winter 2022–23	Youth Squad	–
63	(Belgium)	Christ Souanga^{¥}	LB	Winter 2023–24	Youth Squad	–
99	(Belgium)	Davis Opoku^{¥}	RB / RW	Playoffs 2024	Youth Squad	–
Midfielders
7	(Iceland)	Jón Dagur Þorsteinsson	LW	4 July 2022	(Denmark) AGF	–
10	(Austria)	Raphael Holzhauser	AM	3 June 2022	(Belgium) Beerschot	15 January 2024
11	(Netherlands) / (Democratic Republic of the Congo)	Ezechiel Banzuzi	CM	20 June 2023	(Netherlands) NAC Breda	–
13	(Morocco) / (Belgium)	Sofian Kiyine	AM / LW	2 September 2022	(Italy) Lazio	–
14	(Belgium)	Thibault Vlietinck	RW	12 August 2020	(Belgium) Club Brugge	–
15	(Ivory Coast)	Konan N'Dri	RW	21 July 2023	(Belgium) Eupen	–
17	(Japan)	Kento Misao	DM	19 July 2023	(Portugal) Santa Clara	–
25	(Belgium)	Manuel Osifo	DM / CB	1 February 2024	(Belgium) Oostende	–
27	(Belgium) / (Guinea)	Mandela Keita^{¥}	CM	Winter 2020–21	Youth Squad	10 August 2023
33	(Belgium)	Mathieu Maertens	CM / AM	12 July 2017	(Belgium) Cercle Brugge	–
40	(Belgium) / (Ghana)	Desmond Acquah^{¥}	AM	Summer 2023	Youth Squad	26 January 2024
42	(Belgium)	Jo Gilis	AM	Summer 2018	Youth Squad	–
Forwards
8	(Belgium)	Siebe Schrijvers	CF / AM / RW	15 January 2021	(Belgium) Club Brugge	–
9	(Norway)	Jonatan Braut Brunes	CF	14 August 2023	Strømsgodset	–
19	(Thailand)	Suphanat Mueanta^{ℒ}	RW	13 September 2023	Buriram United	(30 June 2024)
21	(Ghana)	Nathan Opoku^{ℒ}	CF	31 January 2023	(England) Leicester City	(30 June 2024)
43	(Belgium)	Nachon Nsingi^{¥}	CF	Summer 2022	Youth Squad	–
88	(France) / (Morocco)	Youssef Maziz	AM / LW	29 August 2023	(France) Metz	–

=== Did not appear on match sheet ===
The following players were listed as part of Oud-Heverlee Leuven's first-team squad during (part of) the 2023–24 season, but never appeared on the match sheet

No.	Nationality	Name	Position	Joined First Team	Previous club	Left First Team	Note
4	(Bulgaria)	Kristiyan Malinov	DM / CM	20 August 2020	(Bulgaria) CSKA Sofia	8 August 2023	Released after matchday 2
22	(Belgium)	Alexandro Calut^{ℒ}	CB	28 June 2023	(Belgium) Standard Liège	(30 June 2024)	Pre-season long-term injury
30	(Ghana)	Emmanuel Toku	AM	30 January 2023	(Bulgaria) Botev Plovdiv	1 September 2023	Loaned to (Denmark) AaB after matchday 5
78	(Belgium) / (Democratic Republic of the Congo)	Franck Idumbo-Muzambo	CF	Winter 2022–23	Youth Squad	–	Played only for OH Leuven U23

== Transfers ==
=== Transfers In ===
Date Announced	Position	Nationality	Name	From	Fee	Ref.
20 June 2023	MF	(Netherlands)	Ezechiel Banzuzi	(Netherlands) NAC Breda	Undisclosed	
28 June 2023	DF	(Belgium)	Alexandro Calut	(Belgium) Standard Liège	Loan	
End of 2022–23 season	MF	(Austria)	Raphael Holzhauser	(Germany) 1860 Munich	Loan Return	
End of 2022–23 season	MF	(Belgium)	Mandela Keita	(Belgium) Antwerp	Loan Return	
End of 2022–23 season	MF	(France)	Scotty Sadzoute	(France) Nîmes	Loan Return	
1 July 2023	FW	(Ghana)	Nathan Opoku	(England) Leicester City	Loan Extended	(Note: Opoku was already part of the squad on loan from Leicester City during the second half of the 2022-23 season. The loan was extended with a further season until 30 June 2024.)
3 July 2023	DF	(Israel)	Raz Shlomo	(Israel) Maccabi Netanya	Undisclosed	
19 July 2023	MF	(Japan)	Kento Misao	(Portugal) Santa Clara	Undisclosed	
21 July 2023	MF	(Ivory Coast)	Konan N'Dri	Eupen	Undisclosed	
25 July 2023	DF	(France)	Florian Miguel	(Spain) Huesca	Free	
13 August 2023	GK	(France)	Maxence Prévot	Sochaux	Free	
14 August 2023	FW	(Norway)	Jonatan Braut Brunes	Strømsgodset	Undisclosed	
19 August 2023	GK	(Belgium)	Tobe Leysen	Genk	Undisclosed	
29 August 2023	MF	(France)	Youssef Maziz	Metz	Undisclosed	
13 September 2023	FW	(Thailand)	Suphanat Mueanta	Buriram United	Loan	
20 January 2024	DF	(Japan)	Takahiro Akimoto	Urawa Red Diamonds	Loan	
1 February 2024	DF	(Argentina)	Franco Russo	Ludogorets Razgrad	Loan	
1 February 2024	MF	(Belgium)	Manuel Osifo	Oostende	Undisclosed	

=== Transfers Out ===
Date Announced	Position	Nationality	Name	To	Fee	Ref.
11 May 2023	MF	(Jordan)	Musa Al-Taamari	(France) Montpellier	Free	
21 June 2023	MF	(Portugal)	João Gamboa	(Poland) Pogoń Szczecin	Undisclosed	(Note: Gamboa was out on loan from OH Leuven to Estoril during the second half of the 2022-23 season. The loan ended and Gamboa was sold to Pogoń Szczecin.)
End of 2022–23 season	FW	(Spain)	Mario González	(Portugal) Braga	Loan Return	
End of 2022–23 season	DF	(Burkina Faso)	Dylan Ouédraogo	Free Agent	End of Contract	
8 July 2023	DF	(Belgium)	Louis Patris	(Belgium) Anderlecht	Undisclosed	
21 July 2023	DF	(Belgium)	Casper de Norre	Millwall	Undisclosed	
1 August 2023	GK	(Belgium)	Nordin Jackers	(Belgium) Club Brugge	Loan	
8 August 2023	MF	(Bulgaria)	Kristiyan Malinov	Free Agent	Contract Terminated	
10 August 2023	MF	(Belgium)	Mandela Keita	(Belgium) Antwerp	Loan	
2 September 2023	MF	(Ghana)	Emmanuel Toku	(Denmark) AaB	Loan	
4 September 2023	GK	(Romania)	Valentin Cojocaru	(Poland) Pogoń Szczecin	Loan	
10 November 2023	DF	(Argentina)	Santiago Ramos Mingo	(Argentina) Defensa y Justicia	Undisclosed	(Note: Ramos Mingo was already out on loan from OH Leuven to Defensa y Justicia since January 2023. Defensa y Justicia now activated the buy clause that made the transfer permanent.)
15 January 2024	MF	(Austria)	Raphael Holzhauser	Free Agent	Contract Terminated	
26 January 2024	MF	(Belgium)	Desmond Acquah	(Belgium) Dender EH	Loan	
2 February 2024	DF	(Israel)	Raz Shlomo	(Israel) Maccabi Tel Aviv	Undisclosed	

== Pre-season and friendlies ==
Win Draw Loss

17 June 2023 Friendly	OH Leuven (Belgium)	12–1	(Belgium) Kessel-Lo 2000	Kessel-Lo, Belgium
10:00 CEST	Maertens; Nsingi; Acquah; Gilis; Mboko; Holzhauser (pen.); Sagrado; unknown player (o.g.)	Report	Van Den Broeck	Stadium: Bruineveld

21 June 2023 Friendly	OH Leuven (Belgium)	9–0	(Belgium) Bertem-Leefdaal
19:00 CEST	Dom; Nsingi; Holzhauser; Mboko; Ngawa

24 June 2023 Friendly	OH Leuven (Belgium)	3–0	(Belgium) Racing Mechelen	Behind closed doors
11:00 CEST	Maertens; Holzhauser (pen.)	Report		Attendance: 0

28 June 2023 Friendly	OH Leuven (Belgium)	4–0	(Belgium) Tienen
19:00 CEST	Schingtienne; Maertens; Gilis

1 July 2023 Friendly	OH Leuven (Belgium)	1–0	(Belgium) Beerschot	Behind closed doors
15:00 CEST	Sagrado			Attendance: 0

8 July 2022 Friendly	Genk (Belgium)	4–0	(Belgium) OH Leuven	Horst, Netherlands
14:00 CEST	Fadera 39'; Hrošovský 45'; Oyen 47'; Bonsu Baah 81'			Attendance: 0

12 July 2023 Friendly	OH Leuven (Belgium)	5–1	(Belgium) Beveren	Behind closed doors
15:00 CEST	Banzuzi; Holzhauser (pen.); Idumbo-Muzambo		Servais	Attendance: 0

15 July 2023 Friendly	Patro Eisden Maasmechelen (Belgium)	0–2	(Belgium) OH Leuven	Maasmechelen
11:00 CEST

19 July 2023 Friendly	Leicester City (England)	4–2	(Belgium) OH Leuven	Seagrave, England
12:00 CEST	Vardy; Praet; Albrighton; McAteer	report	Banzuzi; Nsingi

22 July 2023 Friendly	Rangers B (Scotland)	1–4	(Belgium) OH Leuven	Seagrave, England
14:25	Ishaka 10'		Schrijvers 13'; Maertens 15'; Banzuzi 62'; Dom 82'

6 January 2024 Friendly	Sparta Rotterdam (Netherlands)	1–2	(Belgium) OH Leuven	Pinatar Arena, Spain
	Lauritsen	Report	N'Dri; Maziz

== Competitions ==
=== Overall record ===
Competition	First match	Last match	Starting round	Final position	Record							
Competition	First match	Last match	Starting round	Final position	Pld	W	D	L	GF	GA	GD	Win %
Pro League Regular Season	30 July 2023	17 March 2024	Matchday 1	12th	30	7	8	15	34	47	−13	23.33
Pro League Europe Play-offs	30 March 2024	25 May 2024	Matchday 1	4th (10th overall)	10	4	3	3	12	12	+0	40.00
Belgian Cup	1 November 2023	24 January 2024	Seventh round	Quarter-finals	3	1	1	1	8	4	+4	33.33
Total					43	12	12	19	54	63	−9	27.91

Source: Soccerway

=== Pro League ===
==== Regular season ====
Pos	Team	Pld	W	D	L	GF	GA	GD	Pts	Qualification or relegation
10	Standard Liège	30	8	10	12	33	41	−8	34	Qualification for the Europe play-offs
11	Westerlo	30	7	9	14	42	54	−12	30	Qualification for the Europe play-offs
12	OH Leuven	30	7	8	15	34	47	−13	29	Qualification for the Europe play-offs
13	Charleroi	30	7	8	15	26	48	−22	29	Qualification for the relegation play-offs
14	Eupen	30	7	3	20	24	58	−34	24	Qualification for the relegation play-offs

Source: Jupiler Pro League (in Dutch), Soccerway
Rules for classification: 1) Points; 2) Matches won; 3) Goal difference; 4) Goals scored; 5) Away matches won; 6) Away goal difference; 7) Away goals scored; 8) Play-off.

===== Results summary =====
Overall								Home						Away					
Pld	W	D	L	GF	GA	GD	Pts	W	D	L	GF	GA	GD	W	D	L	GF	GA	GD
30	7	8	15	34	47	−13	29	5	4	6	19	15	+4	2	4	9	15	32	−17

Source: Jupiler Pro League Ranking

===== Results by round =====
Round	1	2	3	4	5	6	7	8	9	10	11	12	13	14	15	16	17	18	19	20	21	22	23	24	25	26	27	28	29	30
Ground	A	H	A	H	A	H	H	A	H	A	H	A	H	A	H	A	A	H	A	H	H	A	H	A	A	H	A	H	A	H
Result	D	L	L	D	L	W	D	W	L	L	W	L	L	L	L	L	D	L	L	W	D	D	W	W	L	D	D	L	L	W
Position	9	12	15	13	14	12	13	12	13	14	12	13	13	14	14	14	15	15	15	14	14	15	14	12	12	12	12	13	13	12

Source: Jupiler Pro League
A = Away; H = Home; W = Win; D = Draw; L = Loss; = Champions' Play-offs; = Europe Play-offs; = Relegation Play-offs

===== Points breakdown =====
Points at home: 19
Points away from home: 10

Points against 2022/23 Playoff 1 teams (4): 4
Points against 2022/23 Playoff 2 teams (4): 4
Points against other 2022/23 Pro League teams (6): 20
Points against newly promoted teams (1): 1

6 points: Mechelen
4 points: Kortrijk, Sint-Truiden
3 points: Eupen, Genk, Westerlo
2 points: Charleroi
1 point: Anderlecht, Antwerp, Gent, RWD Molenbeek
0 points: Cercle Brugge, Club Brugge, Standard Liège, Union SG

===== Biggest & smallest =====
Biggest home win: 4–0 vs. Sint-Truiden
Biggest home defeat: 0–2 vs. Westerlo; 0–2 vs. Union SG
Biggest away win: 0–3 vs. Westerlo
Biggest away defeat: 5–1 vs. Anderlecht; 5–1 vs. Union SG; 4–0 vs. Gent

Biggest home attendance: 9,800 vs. Westerlo
Smallest home attendance: 6,217 vs. RWD Molenbeek
Biggest away attendance: 21,500 vs. Anderlecht
Smallest away attendance: 0 vs. Charleroi

===== Matches =====
The league fixtures were unveiled on 22 June 2023.

2023–24 Belgian Pro League
Match Details	Home team	Result	Away team	Lineup	Unused Subs	Bookings
Regular Season
30 July 2023; 18:15; Stade du Pays de Charleroi; Charleroi	Charleroi	1–1	Oud-Heverlee Leuven	Cojocaru; Mendyl (81' Dom), Ricca, Pletinckx, Sagrado (46' N'Dri); Schrijvers, Holzhauser (46' Maertens), Banzuzi; Thorsteinsson (81' Nsingi), N. Opoku, Vlietinck (72' Kiyine)	Ravet; Schingtienne	(yellow card) 62' Maertens
30 July 2023; 18:15; Stade du Pays de Charleroi; Charleroi	10' Dabbagh (Mbenza)	1–0; 1–1	84' N. Opoku (pen.)	Cojocaru; Mendyl (81' Dom), Ricca, Pletinckx, Sagrado (46' N'Dri); Schrijvers, Holzhauser (46' Maertens), Banzuzi; Thorsteinsson (81' Nsingi), N. Opoku, Vlietinck (72' Kiyine)	Ravet; Schingtienne	(yellow card) 62' Maertens
5 August 2023; 20:45; Den Dreef; Leuven	Oud-Heverlee Leuven	1–2	RWD Molenbeek	Cojocaru; Mendyl, Ricca, Pletinckx, Sagrado (76' Nsingi); Banzuzi, Keita (64' Holzhauser), Schrijvers; Thorsteinsson, N. Opoku, Maertens (64' N'Dri)	Ravet; Dom; Kiyine; Schingtienne	(yellow card) 31' Sagrado; (yellow card) 31' Mendyl; (yellow card) 90' Thorsteinsson; (yellow card) 90+4' Pletinckx
5 August 2023; 20:45; Den Dreef; Leuven	18' Sagrado (N. Opoku)	1–0; 1–1; 1–2	44' Biron (Mercier); 48' Biron (pen.)	Cojocaru; Mendyl, Ricca, Pletinckx, Sagrado (76' Nsingi); Banzuzi, Keita (64' Holzhauser), Schrijvers; Thorsteinsson, N. Opoku, Maertens (64' N'Dri)	Ravet; Dom; Kiyine; Schingtienne	(yellow card) 31' Sagrado; (yellow card) 31' Mendyl; (yellow card) 90' Thorsteinsson; (yellow card) 90+4' Pletinckx
12 August 2023; 18:15; Joseph Marien Stadium; Forest (Brussels)	Union SG	5–1	Oud-Heverlee Leuven	Cojocaru; Mendyl, Ricca, Pletinckx, Dom; Kiyine (81' Maertens), Banzuzi (74' N'Dri), Miguel (90' Sagrado), Schrijvers (90' Schingtienne); Thorsteinsson, N. Opoku (74' Nsingi)	Ravet; Holzhauser	(yellow card) 44' Banzuzi; (yellow card) 53' Dom; (yellow card) 61' Kiyine; (yellow card) 90+7' Mendyl
12 August 2023; 18:15; Joseph Marien Stadium; Forest (Brussels)	21' Terho (Eckert); 34' Puertas (Lazare) 65' Eckert (pen.); 74' Eckert (pen.); 90' Nilsson (pen.)	1–0; 2–0; 2–1; 3–1; 4–1; 5–1	38' Thorsteinsson (Miguel)	Cojocaru; Mendyl, Ricca, Pletinckx, Dom; Kiyine (81' Maertens), Banzuzi (74' N'Dri), Miguel (90' Sagrado), Schrijvers (90' Schingtienne); Thorsteinsson, N. Opoku (74' Nsingi)	Ravet; Holzhauser	(yellow card) 44' Banzuzi; (yellow card) 53' Dom; (yellow card) 61' Kiyine; (yellow card) 90+7' Mendyl
18 August 2023; 20:45; Den Dreef; Leuven	Oud-Heverlee Leuven	1–1	Antwerp	Prévot; Mendyl, Ricca, Pletinckx, Sagrado; Dom, Banzuzi (75' Maertens), Schrijvers; Vlietinck (90' Schingtienne), N. Opoku (60' Brunes), Thorsteinsson (75' N'Dri)	Cojocaru; Holzhauser; Kiyine	(yellow card) 25' Vlietinck; (yellow card) 48' (yellow-red card) 87' Mendyl; (yellow card) 90+4' Sagrado
18 August 2023; 20:45; Den Dreef; Leuven	82' Sagrado (Vlietinck)	0–1; 1–1	34' Janssen (De Laet)	Prévot; Mendyl, Ricca, Pletinckx, Sagrado; Dom, Banzuzi (75' Maertens), Schrijvers; Vlietinck (90' Schingtienne), N. Opoku (60' Brunes), Thorsteinsson (75' N'Dri)	Cojocaru; Holzhauser; Kiyine	(yellow card) 25' Vlietinck; (yellow card) 48' (yellow-red card) 87' Mendyl; (yellow card) 90+4' Sagrado
26 August 2023; 18:15; Kehrwegstadion; Eupen	Eupen	3–1	Oud-Heverlee Leuven	Prévot; Miguel (46' N'Dri), Ricca, Pletinckx, Sagrado; Dom, Banzuzi (70' Maertens), Schrijvers; Thorsteinsson (70' Nsingi), Brunes, Vlietinck (70' Kiyine)	Leysen; Schingtienne; Shlomo	(yellow card) 32' Banzuzi; (yellow card) 82' Nsingi
26 August 2023; 18:15; Kehrwegstadion; Eupen	24' Magnée (Finnbogason); 50' Nuhu (Finnbogason) 87' Charles-Cook (Déom)	1–0; 2–0; 2–1; 3–1	81' Schrijvers (pen.)	Prévot; Miguel (46' N'Dri), Ricca, Pletinckx, Sagrado; Dom, Banzuzi (70' Maertens), Schrijvers; Thorsteinsson (70' Nsingi), Brunes, Vlietinck (70' Kiyine)	Leysen; Schingtienne; Shlomo	(yellow card) 32' Banzuzi; (yellow card) 82' Nsingi
1 September 2023; 20:45; Den Dreef; Leuven	Oud-Heverlee Leuven	3–0	Kortrijk	Prévot; Pletinckx, Ricca, Schingtienne; Mendyl (80' Misao), Dom, Schrijvers (89' Banzuzi), Sagrado; Maziz (63' Thorsteinsson), Brunes (80' N'Dri), Kiyine	Leysen; Maertens; Nsingi	(yellow card) 69' Kiyine
1 September 2023; 20:45; Den Dreef; Leuven	41' Ricca (Maziz); 54' Schingtienne (Kiyine); 60' Maziz (Mendyl)	1–0; 2–0; 3–0		Prévot; Pletinckx, Ricca, Schingtienne; Mendyl (80' Misao), Dom, Schrijvers (89' Banzuzi), Sagrado; Maziz (63' Thorsteinsson), Brunes (80' N'Dri), Kiyine	Leysen; Maertens; Nsingi	(yellow card) 69' Kiyine
17 September 2023; 18:30; Den Dreef; Leuven	Oud-Heverlee Leuven	1–1	Gent	Prévot; Pletinckx, Ricca (70' Vlietinck), Schingtienne (81' Misao); Mendyl, Dom, Schrijvers, Sagrado; Maziz (64' N'Dri), Brunes (64' Banzuzi), Kiyine (64' Thorsteinsson)	Leysen; Nsingi	(yellow card) 17' Mendyl; (yellow card) 59' Maziz; (yellow card) 80' Thorsteinsson; (yellow card) 90+4' Vlietinck
17 September 2023; 18:30; Den Dreef; Leuven	6' Brunes (Sagrado)	1–0; 1–1	38' Kandouss (Kums)	Prévot; Pletinckx, Ricca (70' Vlietinck), Schingtienne (81' Misao); Mendyl, Dom, Schrijvers, Sagrado; Maziz (64' N'Dri), Brunes (64' Banzuzi), Kiyine (64' Thorsteinsson)	Leysen; Nsingi	(yellow card) 17' Mendyl; (yellow card) 59' Maziz; (yellow card) 80' Thorsteinsson; (yellow card) 90+4' Vlietinck
23 September 2023; 18:15; Achter de Kazerne; Mechelen	Mechelen	1–2	Oud-Heverlee Leuven	Prévot; Schingtienne, Pletinckx, Miguel; Mendyl, Dom, Schrijvers, Sagrado; Thorsteinsson (90'+4' Kiyine), Nsingi (90'+2' Brunes), Maziz	Leysen; Banzuzi; Misao; N'Dri; Vlietinck	(yellow card) 57' Schrijvers; (yellow card) 72' Maziz; (yellow card) 73' Mendyl
23 September 2023; 18:15; Achter de Kazerne; Mechelen	46' Pflücke (Mrabti)	0–1; 0–2; 1–2	2' Thorsteinsson (Nsingi); 45+7' Maziz (without assist)	Prévot; Schingtienne, Pletinckx, Miguel; Mendyl, Dom, Schrijvers, Sagrado; Thorsteinsson (90'+4' Kiyine), Nsingi (90'+2' Brunes), Maziz	Leysen; Banzuzi; Misao; N'Dri; Vlietinck	(yellow card) 57' Schrijvers; (yellow card) 72' Maziz; (yellow card) 73' Mendyl
30 September 2023; 18:15; Den Dreef; Leuven	Oud-Heverlee Leuven	1–2	Standard Liège	Prévot; Pletinckx, Schingtienne, Miguel (87' Brunes); Mendyl, Dom (81' Misao), Schrijvers, Sagrado (46' Vlietinck); Thorsteinsson (87' Banzuzi), Nsingi, Maziz	Leysen; Kiyine; N'Dri	(yellow card) 76' Nsingi; (yellow card) 78' Pletinckx
30 September 2023; 18:15; Den Dreef; Leuven	65' Mendyl (Thorsteinsson)	0–1; 1–1; 1–2	44' Kanga (Alzate) 81 Sowah (without assist)	Prévot; Pletinckx, Schingtienne, Miguel (87' Brunes); Mendyl, Dom (81' Misao), Schrijvers, Sagrado (46' Vlietinck); Thorsteinsson (87' Banzuzi), Nsingi, Maziz	Leysen; Kiyine; N'Dri	(yellow card) 76' Nsingi; (yellow card) 78' Pletinckx
7 October 2023; 16:00; Jan Breydel Stadium; Bruges	Cercle Brugge	3–2	Oud-Heverlee Leuven	Prévot; Pletinckx, Shlomo, Schingtienne; Mendyl, Misao, Schrijvers (81' Kiyine), Vlietinck (69' Dom); Thorsteinsson (37' Banzuzi), Nsingi (69' Brunes), Maziz	Leysen; Miguel; N'Dri	(yellow card) 35' Vlietinck; (yellow card) 56' Schrijvers; (yellow card) 78' Misao
7 October 2023; 16:00; Jan Breydel Stadium; Bruges	3' Denkey (Ravych) 37' Denkey (without assist) 87' Denkey (without assist)	1–0; 1–1; 2–1; 2–2; 3–2	4' Shlomo (Thorsteinsson) 44 Banzuzi (without assist)	Prévot; Pletinckx, Shlomo, Schingtienne; Mendyl, Misao, Schrijvers (81' Kiyine), Vlietinck (69' Dom); Thorsteinsson (37' Banzuzi), Nsingi (69' Brunes), Maziz	Leysen; Miguel; N'Dri	(yellow card) 35' Vlietinck; (yellow card) 56' Schrijvers; (yellow card) 78' Misao
22 October 2023; 19:15; Den Dreef; Leuven	Oud-Heverlee Leuven	4–0	Sint-Truiden	Prévot; Schingtienne, Pletinckx, Miguel; Mendyl, Schrijvers (90' Banzuzi), Misao, Vlietinck; Nsingi (90' N'Dri), Brunes (77' Maertens), Maziz (81' Thorsteinsson)	Leysen; Dom; Shlomo	(yellow card) 62' Schrijvers
22 October 2023; 19:15; Den Dreef; Leuven	12' Nsingi (Maziz); 22' Schrijvers (pen.); 60' Mendyl (Misao); 79' Mendyl (Nsingi)	1–0; 2–0; 3–0; 4–0		Prévot; Schingtienne, Pletinckx, Miguel; Mendyl, Schrijvers (90' Banzuzi), Misao, Vlietinck; Nsingi (90' N'Dri), Brunes (77' Maertens), Maziz (81' Thorsteinsson)	Leysen; Dom; Shlomo	(yellow card) 62' Schrijvers
28 October 2023; 20:45; Constant Vanden Stock Stadium; Anderlecht	Anderlecht	5–1	Oud-Heverlee Leuven	Prévot; Schingtienne, Pletinckx, Miguel; Mendyl (64' N'Dri), Misao, Maziz (64' Maertens), Schrijvers (71' Banzuzi), Vlietinck (4' Dom); Nsingi, Brunes	Leysen; Shlomo; Thorsteinsson	(yellow card) 28' Schingtienne
28 October 2023; 20:45; Constant Vanden Stock Stadium; Anderlecht	12' Dreyer (Stroeykens); 42' Dreyer (Sardella); 47' Dolberg (Augustinsson); 52' Stroeykens (Leoni); 86' Dreyer (Arnstad)	0–1; 1–1; 2–1; 3–1; 4–1; 5–1	6' Misao (Dom)	Prévot; Schingtienne, Pletinckx, Miguel; Mendyl (64' N'Dri), Misao, Maziz (64' Maertens), Schrijvers (71' Banzuzi), Vlietinck (4' Dom); Nsingi, Brunes	Leysen; Shlomo; Thorsteinsson	(yellow card) 28' Schingtienne
4 November 2023; 18:15; Den Dreef; Leuven	Oud-Heverlee Leuven	0–2	Westerlo	Prévot; Schingtienne, Pletinckx, Miguel (88' N'Dri); Mendyl, Misao (71' Maertens), Maziz, Schrijvers, Dom (71' Mueanta); Nsingi (78' N. Opoku), Thorsteinsson	Leysen; Banzuzi; Shlomo	(yellow card) 48' Thorsteinsson; (yellow card) 73' Maertens; (yellow card) 82' Mendyl
4 November 2023; 18:15; Den Dreef; Leuven		0–1; 0–2	64' Madsen (pen.); 69' Sydorchuk (without assist)	Prévot; Schingtienne, Pletinckx, Miguel (88' N'Dri); Mendyl, Misao (71' Maertens), Maziz, Schrijvers, Dom (71' Mueanta); Nsingi (78' N. Opoku), Thorsteinsson	Leysen; Banzuzi; Shlomo	(yellow card) 48' Thorsteinsson; (yellow card) 73' Maertens; (yellow card) 82' Mendyl
12 November 2023; 16:00; Cegeka Arena; Genk	Genk	3–1	Oud-Heverlee Leuven	Prévot; Miguel, Pletinckx, Dom; N'Dri (72' Mueanta), Schrijvers, Misao, Sagrado (72' Ngawa); Maziz (46' Thorsteinsson), N. Opoku (81' Nsingi), Banzuzi (81' Brunes)	Leysen; Acquah	(yellow card) 10' Miguel; (yellow card) 56' Thorsteinsson; (yellow card) 80' N. Opoku; (yellow card) 89' Schrijvers
12 November 2023; 16:00; Cegeka Arena; Genk	25' Heynen (no assist) 90' Heynen (Arokodare); 90+5' Muñoz (no assist)	1–0; 1–1; 2–1; 3–1	85' Brunes (Thorsteinsson)	Prévot; Miguel, Pletinckx, Dom; N'Dri (72' Mueanta), Schrijvers, Misao, Sagrado (72' Ngawa); Maziz (46' Thorsteinsson), N. Opoku (81' Nsingi), Banzuzi (81' Brunes)	Leysen; Acquah	(yellow card) 10' Miguel; (yellow card) 56' Thorsteinsson; (yellow card) 80' N. Opoku; (yellow card) 89' Schrijvers
26 November 2023; 16:00; Den Dreef; Leuven	Oud-Heverlee Leuven	0–1	Club Brugge	Leysen; Mendyl, Miguel (75' N'Dri), Schingtienne, Pletinckx, Sagrado; Schrijvers, Maziz (57' Banzuzi), Misao (89' Nsingi); N. Opoku (57' Brunes), Thorsteinsson	Ravet; Dom; Shlomo	(yellow card) 34' Schingtienne; (yellow card) 42' Miguel; (yellow card) 45+2' Misao; (yellow card) 90+5' Mendyl
26 November 2023; 16:00; Den Dreef; Leuven		0–1	45+2' Jutglà (Buchanan)	Leysen; Mendyl, Miguel (75' N'Dri), Schingtienne, Pletinckx, Sagrado; Schrijvers, Maziz (57' Banzuzi), Misao (89' Nsingi); N. Opoku (57' Brunes), Thorsteinsson	Ravet; Dom; Shlomo	(yellow card) 34' Schingtienne; (yellow card) 42' Miguel; (yellow card) 45+2' Misao; (yellow card) 90+5' Mendyl
2 December 2023; 20:45; Bosuilstadion; Antwerp	Antwerp	1–0	Oud-Heverlee Leuven	Leysen; Miguel, Schingtienne, Pletinckx, Sagrado; Mendyl (79' Nsingi), Shlomo, Schrijvers (73' Maziz), Banzuzi, Thorsteinsson (62' N'Dri); N. Opoku (62' Brunes)	Ravet; Dom; Ngawa	(yellow card) 57' Schrijvers; (yellow card) 72' Mendyl; (yellow card) 88' N'Dri
2 December 2023; 20:45; Bosuilstadion; Antwerp	44' Balikwisha (Janssen)	1–0		Leysen; Miguel, Schingtienne, Pletinckx, Sagrado; Mendyl (79' Nsingi), Shlomo, Schrijvers (73' Maziz), Banzuzi, Thorsteinsson (62' N'Dri); N. Opoku (62' Brunes)	Ravet; Dom; Ngawa	(yellow card) 57' Schrijvers; (yellow card) 72' Mendyl; (yellow card) 88' N'Dri
8 December 2023; 20:45; Stayen; Sint-Truiden	Sint-Truiden	1–1	Oud-Heverlee Leuven	Leysen; Mendyl (68' Ngawa), Miguel, Schingtienne, Pletinckx, Sagrado; Thorsteinsson (60' Mueanta), Shlomo, Banzuzi; Nsingi (68' N. Opoku), Brunes (38' Dom)	Prévot; Maziz; N'Dri	(red card) 31' Sagrado; (yellow card) 57' Shlomo; (yellow card) 66' Miguel
8 December 2023; 20:45; Stayen; Sint-Truiden	6' Zahiroleslam (Steuckers)	1–0; 1–1	18' Brunes (Thorsteinsson)	Leysen; Mendyl (68' Ngawa), Miguel, Schingtienne, Pletinckx, Sagrado; Thorsteinsson (60' Mueanta), Shlomo, Banzuzi; Nsingi (68' N. Opoku), Brunes (38' Dom)	Prévot; Maziz; N'Dri	(red card) 31' Sagrado; (yellow card) 57' Shlomo; (yellow card) 66' Miguel
16 December 2023; 16:00; Den Dreef; Leuven	Oud-Heverlee Leuven	1–2	Cercle Brugge	Leysen; Mendyl, Schingtienne, Pletinckx, Shlomo, Dom (90+5' Mueanta); Banzuzi, Thorsteinsson (79' Maziz), Schrijvers; Nsingi (71' N. Opoku), Brunes	Prévot; Miguel; N'Dri; Ngawa	(yellow card) 44' Mendyl; (yellow card) 45' Dom; (yellow card) 90' Shlomo; (yellow card) 90+3' Brunes
16 December 2023; 16:00; Den Dreef; Leuven	2' Thorsteinsson (Nsingi)	1–0; 1–1; 1–2	59' Denkey (Somers); 90+5' Denkey (pen.)	Leysen; Mendyl, Schingtienne, Pletinckx, Shlomo, Dom (90+5' Mueanta); Banzuzi, Thorsteinsson (79' Maziz), Schrijvers; Nsingi (71' N. Opoku), Brunes	Prévot; Miguel; N'Dri; Ngawa	(yellow card) 44' Mendyl; (yellow card) 45' Dom; (yellow card) 90' Shlomo; (yellow card) 90+3' Brunes
21 December 2023; 20:45; Ghelamco Arena; Ghent	Gent	4–0	Oud-Heverlee Leuven	Leysen; Schingtienne, Pletinckx, Miguel; Mendyl (46' N'Dri), Shlomo (78' Ngawa), Schrijvers, Dom; Thorsteinsson (58' Brunes), Nsingi (83' N. Opoku), Banzuzi (46' Maziz)	Prévot; Mueanta	(yellow card) 42' Banzuzi
21 December 2023; 20:45; Ghelamco Arena; Ghent	4' Samoise (Fofana); 57' Fofana (Hong); 65' Cuypers (Kums); 69' Watanabe (Kums)	1–0; 2–0; 3–0; 4–0		Leysen; Schingtienne, Pletinckx, Miguel; Mendyl (46' N'Dri), Shlomo (78' Ngawa), Schrijvers, Dom; Thorsteinsson (58' Brunes), Nsingi (83' N. Opoku), Banzuzi (46' Maziz)	Prévot; Mueanta	(yellow card) 42' Banzuzi
26 December 2023; 16:00; Den Dreef; Leuven	Oud-Heverlee Leuven	3–0	Eupen	Leysen; Schingtienne, Pletinckx, Miguel; Thorsteinsson (72' Mueanta), Schrijvers, Maziz (80' Ngawa), Banzuzi (54' Shlomo), Sagrado; Nsingi (80' N'Dri), Brunes (72' Maertens)	Prévot; N. Opoku	(yellow card) 22' Pletinckx; (yellow card) 42' Banzuzi
26 December 2023; 16:00; Den Dreef; Leuven	2' Thorsteinsson (Maziz); 29' Maziz (Brunes); 89' Mueanta (N'Dri)	1–0; 2–0; 3–0		Leysen; Schingtienne, Pletinckx, Miguel; Thorsteinsson (72' Mueanta), Schrijvers, Maziz (80' Ngawa), Banzuzi (54' Shlomo), Sagrado; Nsingi (80' N'Dri), Brunes (72' Maertens)	Prévot; N. Opoku	(yellow card) 22' Pletinckx; (yellow card) 42' Banzuzi
21 January 2024; 18:30; Den Dreef; Leuven	Oud-Heverlee Leuven	1–1	Anderlecht	Leysen; Miguel, Ricca, Pletinckx, Schingtienne; Thorsteinsson (82' Brunes), Banzuzi, Maziz (66' Maertens), Schrijvers, Sagrado; Nsingi (66' N'Dri)	Prévot; Ravet; Dom; Ngawa; N. Opoku; Shlomo	(yellow card) 79' Miguel; (yellow card) 90+2' Ricca
21 January 2024; 18:30; Den Dreef; Leuven	10' Maziz (without assist)	1–0; 1–1	70' Patris (Dolberg)	Leysen; Miguel, Ricca, Pletinckx, Schingtienne; Thorsteinsson (82' Brunes), Banzuzi, Maziz (66' Maertens), Schrijvers, Sagrado; Nsingi (66' N'Dri)	Prévot; Ravet; Dom; Ngawa; N. Opoku; Shlomo	(yellow card) 79' Miguel; (yellow card) 90+2' Ricca
27 January 2024; 16:00; Guldensporen Stadion; Kortrijk	Kortrijk	0–0	Oud-Heverlee Leuven	Leysen; Miguel, Ricca, Pletinckx, Schingtienne (46' Shlomo); Banzuzi, Maziz (84' Nsingi), Schrijvers; Thorsteinsson (69' Dom), Maertens (59' N. Opoku), N'Dri (59' Sagrado)	Prévot; Akimoto; Brunes; Ngawa	(yellow card) 56' Banzuzi
31 January 2024; 18:45; Den Dreef; Leuven	Oud-Heverlee Leuven	2–1	Genk	Leysen; Miguel (74' Akimoto), Ricca, Pletinckx, Schingtienne; Thorsteinsson (65' Maertens), Dom, Maziz (85' Shlomo), Schrijvers, Sagrado (74' N'Dri); Nsingi (74' Brunes)	Prévot; Misao; Ngawa; N. Opoku	(yellow card) 45+3' Schrijvers; (yellow card) 47' Thorsteinsson
31 January 2024; 18:45; Den Dreef; Leuven	80' Schrijvers (pen.); 90' Pletinckx (without assist)	0–1; 1–1; 2–1	54' Ricca (o.g.)	Leysen; Miguel (74' Akimoto), Ricca, Pletinckx, Schingtienne; Thorsteinsson (65' Maertens), Dom, Maziz (85' Shlomo), Schrijvers, Sagrado (74' N'Dri); Nsingi (74' Brunes)	Prévot; Misao; Ngawa; N. Opoku	(yellow card) 45+3' Schrijvers; (yellow card) 47' Thorsteinsson
3 February 2024; 18:15; Het Kuipje; Westerlo	Westerlo	0–3	Oud-Heverlee Leuven	Leysen; Miguel (59' Russo), Ricca, Pletinckx, Schingtienne; Banzuzi, Dom, Schrijvers (31' Misao); Maziz (59' Maertens), Nsingi (74' N'Dri), Sagrado (46' Akimoto)	Prévot; Brunes; Mueanta; N. Opoku	(yellow card) 17' Sagrado; (yellow card) 75' Ricca
3 February 2024; 18:15; Het Kuipje; Westerlo		0–1; 0–2; 0–3	2' Banzuzi (Maziz); 11' Miguel (Schrijvers); 60' Maertens (without assist)	Leysen; Miguel (59' Russo), Ricca, Pletinckx, Schingtienne; Banzuzi, Dom, Schrijvers (31' Misao); Maziz (59' Maertens), Nsingi (74' N'Dri), Sagrado (46' Akimoto)	Prévot; Brunes; Mueanta; N. Opoku	(yellow card) 17' Sagrado; (yellow card) 75' Ricca
10 February 2024; 16:00; Stade Maurice Dufrasne; Liège	Standard Liège	1–0	Oud-Heverlee Leuven	Leysen; Miguel, Ricca, Pletinckx, Schingtienne (46' Sagrado); Maziz (73' Mueanta), Schrijvers, Dom (82' N. Opoku), Banzuzi, Thorsteinsson (60' Maertens); Nsingi (59' Brunes)	Prévot; Akimoto; Misao; Ngawa	(yellow card) 11' Ricca; (yellow card) 30' Schrijvers; (yellow card) 59' Nsingi
10 February 2024; 16:00; Stade Maurice Dufrasne; Liège	19' O'Neill (Alzate)	1–0		Leysen; Miguel, Ricca, Pletinckx, Schingtienne (46' Sagrado); Maziz (73' Mueanta), Schrijvers, Dom (82' N. Opoku), Banzuzi, Thorsteinsson (60' Maertens); Nsingi (59' Brunes)	Prévot; Akimoto; Misao; Ngawa	(yellow card) 11' Ricca; (yellow card) 30' Schrijvers; (yellow card) 59' Nsingi
17 February 2024; 18:15; Den Dreef; Leuven	Oud-Heverlee Leuven	0–0	Charleroi	Leysen; Pletinckx, Ricca, Miguel (64' Akimoto); Thorsteinsson, Schrijvers (82' Brunes), Maertens, Banzuzi, Sagrado (83' Mueanta); N. Opoku (88' Nsingi), Maziz	Prévot; Dom; Misao; Russo; Schingtienne	(yellow card) 14' Maertens; (yellow card) 48' Maziz
24 February 2024; 16:00; Edmond Machtens Stadium; Molenbeek-Saint-Jean	RWD Molenbeek	1–1	Oud-Heverlee Leuven	Leysen; Miguel, Russo (22' Schingtienne), Pletinckx, Ricca, Sagrado; Schrijvers, Maertens (88' Brunes), Banzuzi; N. Opoku (67' Nsingi), Maziz (67' Thorsteinsson)	Prévot; Akimoto; Dom; Misao; Mendyl	(yellow card) 17' Maertens; (yellow card) 59' Schrijvers; (yellow card) 79' Ricca
24 February 2024; 16:00; Edmond Machtens Stadium; Molenbeek-Saint-Jean	30' Biron (Camara)	0–1; 1–1	36' Pletinckx (Maziz)	Leysen; Miguel, Russo (22' Schingtienne), Pletinckx, Ricca, Sagrado; Schrijvers, Maertens (88' Brunes), Banzuzi; N. Opoku (67' Nsingi), Maziz (67' Thorsteinsson)	Prévot; Akimoto; Dom; Misao; Mendyl	(yellow card) 17' Maertens; (yellow card) 59' Schrijvers; (yellow card) 79' Ricca
2 March 2024; 18:15; Den Dreef; Leuven	Oud-Heverlee Leuven	0–2	Union SG	Leysen; Pletinckx, Ricca, Schingtienne; Mendyl (81' Nsingi), Banzuzi (64' Misao), Schrijvers (86' Mueanta), Sagrado; Thorsteinsson (64' Maziz), Brunes (81' N. Opoku), Maertens	Prévot; Akimoto; Dom; Miguel	(yellow card) 6' Thorsteinsson; (yellow card) 24' Maertens; (yellow card) 79' Misao
2 March 2024; 18:15; Den Dreef; Leuven		0–1; 0–2	28' Sykes (without assist); 74' Terho (Nilsson)	Leysen; Pletinckx, Ricca, Schingtienne; Mendyl (81' Nsingi), Banzuzi (64' Misao), Schrijvers (86' Mueanta), Sagrado; Thorsteinsson (64' Maziz), Brunes (81' N. Opoku), Maertens	Prévot; Akimoto; Dom; Miguel	(yellow card) 6' Thorsteinsson; (yellow card) 24' Maertens; (yellow card) 79' Misao
10 March 2024; 16:00; Jan Breydel Stadium; Bruges	Club Brugge	3–1	Oud-Heverlee Leuven	Leysen; Akimoto (83' N. Opoku), Ricca (71' Mendyl), Pletinckx, Schingtienne; Schrijvers (71' Misao), Maziz, Banzuzi (89' Dom); Thorsteinsson (83' Miguel), Brunes, Sagrado	Prévot; Mueanta; Ngawa; Nsingi	(yellow card) 60' Schingtienne; (yellow card) 68' Akimoto
10 March 2024; 16:00; Jan Breydel Stadium; Bruges	40' Leysen (o.g.); 62' Vanaken (without assist); 64' Meijer (without assist)	0–1; 1–1; 2–1; 3–1	31' Pletinckx (Thorsteinsson)	Leysen; Akimoto (83' N. Opoku), Ricca (71' Mendyl), Pletinckx, Schingtienne; Schrijvers (71' Misao), Maziz, Banzuzi (89' Dom); Thorsteinsson (83' Miguel), Brunes, Sagrado	Prévot; Mueanta; Ngawa; Nsingi	(yellow card) 60' Schingtienne; (yellow card) 68' Akimoto
17 March 2024; 18:30; Den Dreef; Leuven	Oud-Heverlee Leuven	1–0	Mechelen	Leysen; Pletinckx, Ricca, Schingtienne; Akimoto, Banzuzi (69' Dom), Schrijvers, Sagrado (82' Mendyl); Thorsteinsson (69' Mueanta), Brunes (61' N. Opoku), Maziz (82' Nsingi)	Prévot; Gilis; Miguel; Misao	(yellow card) 51' Ricca; (yellow card) 62' Banzuzi; (yellow card) 76' Maziz; (yellow card) 84' Pletinckx
17 March 2024; 18:30; Den Dreef; Leuven	90'+2' Nsingi (Schrijvers)	1–0		Leysen; Pletinckx, Ricca, Schingtienne; Akimoto, Banzuzi (69' Dom), Schrijvers, Sagrado (82' Mendyl); Thorsteinsson (69' Mueanta), Brunes (61' N. Opoku), Maziz (82' Nsingi)	Prévot; Gilis; Miguel; Misao	(yellow card) 51' Ricca; (yellow card) 62' Banzuzi; (yellow card) 76' Maziz; (yellow card) 84' Pletinckx

==== Europe Play-offs ====
Pos	Team	Pld	W	D	L	GF	GA	GD	Pts	Qualification or relegation	GNT	MEC	STR	OHL	WES	STA
1	Gent (O)	10	8	0	2	27	10	+17	48	Qualification for the European competition play-off	—	3–1	2–0	0–1	3–2	5–1
2	Mechelen	10	5	1	4	20	18	+2	39		2–4	—	2–3	3–0	3–2	3–2
3	Sint-Truiden	10	3	4	3	14	15	−1	33		0–2	2–1	—	1–1	2–0	3–3
4	OH Leuven	10	4	3	3	12	12	0	30		2–1	2–3	1–0	—	1–2	3–1
5	Westerlo	10	2	3	5	17	20	−3	24		0–3	0–2	2–2	1–1	—	3–3
6	Standard Liège	10	0	5	5	12	27	−15	22		1–4	0–0	1–1	0–0	0–5 (Note: Supporters of Standard Liège prevented the start of the game by blocking Standard's team bus's departure. On 28 May 2024, the Royal Belgian Football Association ruled that Standard had done too little to prevent this situation. As a result, the match was not replayed and Westerlo was awarded a 5–0 forfeit win.)	—

Source: Jupiler Pro League (in Dutch), Soccerway
Legend: Blue = home team win; Yellow = draw; Red = away team win.
Rules for classification: 1) Points; 2) Points without (possible) half points added due to rounding; 3) Regular season finishing position.
(O) Play-off winners

===== Results summary =====
Overall								Home						Away					
Pld	W	D	L	GF	GA	GD	Pts	W	D	L	GF	GA	GD	W	D	L	GF	GA	GD
10	4	3	3	12	12	0	15	3	0	2	9	7	+2	1	3	1	3	5	−2

Source: Jupiler Pro League Ranking

===== Results by round =====
Round	1	2	3	4	5	6	7	8	9	10
Ground	H	A	H	H	A	A	H	A	A	H
Result	L	D	W	W	D	L	W	W	D	L
Position	6	5	5	4	4	4	4	4	4	4

Source: Jupiler Pro League
A = Away; H = Home; W = Win; D = Draw; L = Loss; = European competition play-off

===== Matches =====
The play-off fixtures were unveiled on 18 March 2024.

Europe Play-offs
Match Details	Home team	Result	Away team	Lineup	Unused Subs	Bookings
30 March 2024; 18:15; Den Dreef; Leuven	Oud-Heverlee Leuven	2–3	Mechelen	Leysen; Schingtienne, Pletinckx, Miguel (57' Russo); Akimoto, Schrijvers, Maziz, Misao (57' Maertens), Sagrado (68' N. Opoku); Nsingi (58' Banzuzi), Brunes (57' Thorsteinsson)	Prévot; Dom; Mendyl; Souanga	(yellow card) 90' Maziz
30 March 2024; 18:15; Den Dreef; Leuven	74' Maziz (Akimoto); 90'+6' N. Opoku (Maertens)	0–1; 0–2; 1–2; 2–2; 2–3	5' Cobbaut (Pflücke); 52' Foulon (Slimani) 90'+7' Konaté (without assist)	Leysen; Schingtienne, Pletinckx, Miguel (57' Russo); Akimoto, Schrijvers, Maziz, Misao (57' Maertens), Sagrado (68' N. Opoku); Nsingi (58' Banzuzi), Brunes (57' Thorsteinsson)	Prévot; Dom; Mendyl; Souanga	(yellow card) 90' Maziz
6 April 2024; 18:15; Stade Maurice Dufrasne; Liège	Standard Liège	0–0	Oud-Heverlee Leuven	Leysen; Pletinckx, Ricca, Russo (77' Sagrado); Akimoto (84' Souanga), Schrijvers, Maziz (77' Dom), Banzuzi, Schingtienne; Thorsteinsson (84' Brunes), Maertens (77' Nsingi)	Prévot; Mendyl; Miguel; Misao	(yellow card) 74' Schingtienne; (yellow card) 90+2' Souanga
14 April 2024; 19:15; Den Dreef; Leuven	Oud-Heverlee Leuven	2–1	Gent	Leysen; Pletinckx, Ricca (11' Schingtienne), Russo (87' Miguel); Akimoto, Schrijvers, Maziz (70' Misao), Banzuzi, Sagrado; Thorsteinsson (87' Nsingi), Maertens (70' Brunes)	Prévot; Dom; Mendyl; Ngawa	(yellow card) 45+3' Maertens; (yellow card) 90+1' Akimoto
14 April 2024; 19:15; Den Dreef; Leuven	23' Maertens (Thorsteinsson) 37' Maertens (without assist)	1–0; 1–1; 2–1	25' Fernandez-Pardo (without assist)	Leysen; Pletinckx, Ricca (11' Schingtienne), Russo (87' Miguel); Akimoto, Schrijvers, Maziz (70' Misao), Banzuzi, Sagrado; Thorsteinsson (87' Nsingi), Maertens (70' Brunes)	Prévot; Dom; Mendyl; Ngawa	(yellow card) 45+3' Maertens; (yellow card) 90+1' Akimoto
20 April 2024; 16:00; Den Dreef; Leuven	Oud-Heverlee Leuven	1–0	Sint-Truiden	Leysen; Russo, Ricca, Schingtienne; Akimoto (90' Misao), Schrijvers, Banzuzi, Sagrado (70' Mendyl); Thorsteinsson (87' Dom), Brunes (70' Maziz), Maertens (87' Nsingi)	Prévot; Miguel; Ngawa; Souanga	(yellow card) 59' Sagrado
20 April 2024; 16:00; Den Dreef; Leuven	83' Maziz (Schrijvers)	1–0		Leysen; Russo, Ricca, Schingtienne; Akimoto (90' Misao), Schrijvers, Banzuzi, Sagrado (70' Mendyl); Thorsteinsson (87' Dom), Brunes (70' Maziz), Maertens (87' Nsingi)	Prévot; Miguel; Ngawa; Souanga	(yellow card) 59' Sagrado
23 April 2024; 20:30; Het Kuipje; Westerlo	Westerlo	1–1	Oud-Heverlee Leuven	Leysen; Schingtienne, Russo, Akimoto; Mendyl, Banzuzi (81' Misao), Schrijvers, Sagrado; Thorsteinsson (81' Nsingi), Brunes (56' Maziz), Maertens (81' N. Opoku (87' Dom))	Prévot; Miguel; Ngawa; Souanga	(yellow card) 70' Sagrado; (yellow card) 72' Banzuzi; (yellow card) 83' Russo
23 April 2024; 20:30; Het Kuipje; Westerlo	24' Tagir (Haspolat)	1–0; 1–1	77' Maertens (Mendyl)	Leysen; Schingtienne, Russo, Akimoto; Mendyl, Banzuzi (81' Misao), Schrijvers, Sagrado; Thorsteinsson (81' Nsingi), Brunes (56' Maziz), Maertens (81' N. Opoku (87' Dom))	Prévot; Miguel; Ngawa; Souanga	(yellow card) 70' Sagrado; (yellow card) 72' Banzuzi; (yellow card) 83' Russo
27 April 2024; 16:00; Achter de Kazerne; Mechelen	Mechelen	3–0	Oud-Heverlee Leuven	Leysen; Schingtienne, Russo, Akimoto; Mendyl (62' Nsingi), Banzuzi, Schrijvers (81' Misao), Sagrado (81' Dom); Thorsteinsson (90+3' Mueanta), Maertens (62' Brunes), Maziz	Prévot; Miguel; Ngawa; Souanga	(yellow card) 75' Thorsteinsson
27 April 2024; 16:00; Achter de Kazerne; Mechelen	47' Schoofs (Storm); 58' Bassette (Schoofs); 90+2' Mrabti (Storm)	1–0; 2–0; 3–0		Leysen; Schingtienne, Russo, Akimoto; Mendyl (62' Nsingi), Banzuzi, Schrijvers (81' Misao), Sagrado (81' Dom); Thorsteinsson (90+3' Mueanta), Maertens (62' Brunes), Maziz	Prévot; Miguel; Ngawa; Souanga	(yellow card) 75' Thorsteinsson
5 May 2024; 16:00; Den Dreef; Leuven	Oud-Heverlee Leuven	3–1	Standard Liège	Prévot; Schingtienne, Russo, Ricca; Sagrado (82' Misao), Banzuzi (82' Pletinckx), Schrijvers, Akimoto; Mueanta (65' Nsingi), Maertens (65' Thorsteinsson), Maziz (75' Dom)	Leysen; Brunes; Mendyl; Ngawa	(yellow card) 90+3' Thorsteinsson
5 May 2024; 16:00; Den Dreef; Leuven	47' Maziz (without assist); 74' Nsingi (Thorsteinsson); 90+3' Thorsteinsson (Nsingi)	0–1; 1–1; 2–1; 3–1	43' Yeboah (without assist)	Prévot; Schingtienne, Russo, Ricca; Sagrado (82' Misao), Banzuzi (82' Pletinckx), Schrijvers, Akimoto; Mueanta (65' Nsingi), Maertens (65' Thorsteinsson), Maziz (75' Dom)	Leysen; Brunes; Mendyl; Ngawa	(yellow card) 90+3' Thorsteinsson
12 May 2024; 13:30; Ghelamco Arena; Ghent	Gent	0–1	Oud-Heverlee Leuven	Prévot; Russo, Ricca, Schingtienne; Mendyl (58' Miguel), Dom (58' Misao), Maziz (72' Schrijvers), Banzuzi, Akimoto; Nsingi (46' Mueanta), Maertens (81' Brunes)	Leysen; N'Dri; Ngawa; D. Opoku	(yellow card) 80' Russo; (yellow card) 90+3' Brunes; (yellow card) 90+4' Misao
12 May 2024; 13:30; Ghelamco Arena; Ghent		0–1	6' Russo (Maziz)	Prévot; Russo, Ricca, Schingtienne; Mendyl (58' Miguel), Dom (58' Misao), Maziz (72' Schrijvers), Banzuzi, Akimoto; Nsingi (46' Mueanta), Maertens (81' Brunes)	Leysen; N'Dri; Ngawa; D. Opoku	(yellow card) 80' Russo; (yellow card) 90+3' Brunes; (yellow card) 90+4' Misao
17 May 2024; 20:45; Stayen; Sint-Truiden	Sint-Truiden	1–1	Oud-Heverlee Leuven	Leysen; Russo, Ricca (76' Mendyl), Schingtienne; Miguel, Misao (68' Banzuzi), Schrijvers, Akimoto; Maertens (68' Thorsteinsson), Mueanta (68' Nsingi), Maziz	Prévot; Dom; Ngawa; Osifo; Souanga	
17 May 2024; 20:45; Stayen; Sint-Truiden	66' Kaya (Delorge)	0–1; 1–1	74' Thorsteinsson (Maziz)	Leysen; Russo, Ricca (76' Mendyl), Schingtienne; Miguel, Misao (68' Banzuzi), Schrijvers, Akimoto; Maertens (68' Thorsteinsson), Mueanta (68' Nsingi), Maziz	Prévot; Dom; Ngawa; Osifo; Souanga	
25 May 2024; 20:30; Den Dreef; Leuven	Oud-Heverlee Leuven	1–2	Westerlo	Prévot; Akimoto, Ricca, Russo, Schingtienne; Schrijvers, Dom (83' Ngawa), Banzuzi (59' Maertens); Thorsteinsson (73' Mendyl), Mueanta (59' Nsingi), Maziz (73' Miguel)	Leysen; Misao; Osifo; Souanga	(yellow card) 7' Schingtienne; (red card) 25' Ricca; (yellow card) 45+4' (yellow-red card) 68' Russo; (yellow card) 69' Maertens
25 May 2024; 20:30; Den Dreef; Leuven	52' Thorsteinsson (without assist)	0–1; 0–2; 1–2	33' Vaesen (Rommens); 45+3' Tagir (Haspolat)	Prévot; Akimoto, Ricca, Russo, Schingtienne; Schrijvers, Dom (83' Ngawa), Banzuzi (59' Maertens); Thorsteinsson (73' Mendyl), Mueanta (59' Nsingi), Maziz (73' Miguel)	Leysen; Misao; Osifo; Souanga	(yellow card) 7' Schingtienne; (red card) 25' Ricca; (yellow card) 45+4' (yellow-red card) 68' Russo; (yellow card) 69' Maertens

=== Belgian Cup ===
==== Results ====
2023–24 Belgian Cup
Match Details	Home team	Result	Away team	Lineup	Unused Subs	Bookings
7th Round
1 November 2023; 18:00; Den Dreef; Leuven	Oud-Heverlee Leuven	5–0	Elene Grotenberge	Leysen; Pletinckx, Schingtienne, Shlomo, Miguel, Dom (68' Mueanta); Misao (72' Kiyine), Banzuzi, Maertens (78' Acquah); Thorsteinsson (68' N. Opoku), N'Dri	Prévot; Nsingi; Schrijvers	(yellow card) 23' Banzuzi
1 November 2023; 18:00; Den Dreef; Leuven	12' Shlomo (Thorsteinsson); 25' Miguel (without assist); 41' Maertens (Thorsteinsson); 72' Banzuzi (N. Opoku); 77' N'Dri (pen.)	1–0; 2–0; 3–0; 4–0; 5–0		Leysen; Pletinckx, Schingtienne, Shlomo, Miguel, Dom (68' Mueanta); Misao (72' Kiyine), Banzuzi, Maertens (78' Acquah); Thorsteinsson (68' N. Opoku), N'Dri	Prévot; Nsingi; Schrijvers	(yellow card) 23' Banzuzi
8th Round
6 December 2023; 20:00; Burgemeester Graaf Leopold Lippens Park; Knokke	Knokke	1–1 (a.e.t.) 2–4 (p)	Oud-Heverlee Leuven	Leysen; Mendyl, Pletinckx, Schingtienne, Sagrado; Maziz, Dom (63' Shlomo), Banzuzi (46' Schrijvers); Nsingi (46' Brunes), N'Dri (79' Holzhauser), Thorsteinsson	Prévot; Miguel; Ngawa	(yellow card) 35' Banzuzi; (yellow card) 61' Dom; (yellow card) 78' Shlomo; (yellow card) 88' Mendyl; (yellow card) 88' Miguel; (yellow card) 119' Thorsteinsson
6 December 2023; 20:00; Burgemeester Graaf Leopold Lippens Park; Knokke	45+3' Pieters (Prudhomme)	0–1; 1–1	24' Dom (Nsingi)	Leysen; Mendyl, Pletinckx, Schingtienne, Sagrado; Maziz, Dom (63' Shlomo), Banzuzi (46' Schrijvers); Nsingi (46' Brunes), N'Dri (79' Holzhauser), Thorsteinsson	Prévot; Miguel; Ngawa	(yellow card) 35' Banzuzi; (yellow card) 61' Dom; (yellow card) 78' Shlomo; (yellow card) 88' Mendyl; (yellow card) 88' Miguel; (yellow card) 119' Thorsteinsson
6 December 2023; 20:00; Burgemeester Graaf Leopold Lippens Park; Knokke	Aelterman (penalty scored) Bailly (penalty scored) Jalloh (penalty missed) Addo (penalty missed)	Penalty shoot-out 0–1; 1–1; 1–2; 2–2; 2–3; 2–3; 2–4; 2–4	Schrijvers (penalty scored) Thorsteinsson (penalty scored) Brunes (penalty scored) Holzhauser (penalty scored)	Leysen; Mendyl, Pletinckx, Schingtienne, Sagrado; Maziz, Dom (63' Shlomo), Banzuzi (46' Schrijvers); Nsingi (46' Brunes), N'Dri (79' Holzhauser), Thorsteinsson	Prévot; Miguel; Ngawa	(yellow card) 35' Banzuzi; (yellow card) 61' Dom; (yellow card) 78' Shlomo; (yellow card) 88' Mendyl; (yellow card) 88' Miguel; (yellow card) 119' Thorsteinsson
Quarter-finals
24 January 2024 (Note: Match initially scheduled on 17 January 2024 but postponed due to snow.); 20:30; Den Dreef; Leuven	Oud-Heverlee Leuven	2–3	Antwerp	Leysen; Miguel (72' Brunes), Pletinckx (59' Banzuzi), Shlomo, Schingtienne; Thorsteinsson (59' Nsingi), Dom (90'+4' Ricca), Maziz, Schrijvers (59' Maertens), Sagrado; N'Dri	Prévot; Ngawa	(yellow card) 64' Banzuzi; (yellow card) 90' Shlomo
24 January 2024; 20:30; Den Dreef; Leuven	2' Maziz (N'Dri) 79' Maertens (Schingtienne)	1–0; 1–1; 1–2; 1–3; 2–3	8' Janssen (pen.); 18' Janssen (Keita); 54' Van Den Bosch (without assist)	Leysen; Miguel (72' Brunes), Pletinckx (59' Banzuzi), Shlomo, Schingtienne; Thorsteinsson (59' Nsingi), Dom (90'+4' Ricca), Maziz, Schrijvers (59' Maertens), Sagrado; N'Dri	Prévot; Ngawa	(yellow card) 64' Banzuzi; (yellow card) 90' Shlomo

== Squad statistics ==
Includes only competitive matches.

=== Appearances ===
Players with no appearances are not included in the list.

No.	Pos.	Nat.	Name	Belgian Pro League Regular season			Belgian Pro League Playoffs			Belgian Cup			Total		
No.	Pos.	Nat.	Name	Starts	Sub	Unused Sub	Starts	Sub	Unused Sub	Starts	Sub	Unused Sub	Starts	Sub	Unused Sub
1	GK	(Belgium)	Tobe Leysen	16	0	10	7	0	3	3	0	0	26	0	13
5	DF	(Belgium)	Pierre-Yves Ngawa	0	4	7	0	1	7	0	0	2	0	5	16
6	MF	(Belgium)	Joren Dom	14	7	8	2	5	3	3	0	0	19	12	11
7	MF	(Iceland)	Jón Dagur Þorsteinsson	23	5	1	6	3	0	3	0	0	32	8	1
8	MF	(Belgium)	Siebe Schrijvers	29	0	0	9	1	0	1	1	1	39	2	1
9	FW	(Norway)	Jonatan Braut Brunes	11	13	2	3	4	1	0	2	0	14	19	3
11	MF	(Netherlands)	Ezechiel Banzuzi	20	7	2	8	2	0	2	1	0	30	10	2
13	MF	(Morocco)	Sofian Kiyine	3	4	3	0	0	0	0	1	0	3	5	3
14	DF	(Uruguay)	Federico Ricca	17	0	0	7	0	0	0	1	0	24	1	0
15	MF	(Ivory Coast)	Konan N'Dri	2	17	5	0	0	1	3	0	0	5	17	6
16	GK	(France)	Maxence Prévot	11	0	14	3	0	7	0	0	3	14	0	24
17	MF	(Japan)	Kento Misao	6	6	6	2	6	2	1	0	0	9	12	8
18	DF	(France)	Florian Miguel	20	1	4	2	3	4	2	0	1	24	4	9
19	MF	(Thailand)	Suphanat Mueanta	0	9	3	3	2	0	0	1	0	3	12	3
20	MF	(Morocco)	Hamza Mendyl	18	2	1	3	3	4	1	0	0	22	5	5
21	FW	(Ghana)	Nathan Opoku	9	9	4	0	2	0	0	1	0	9	12	4
23	DF	(Belgium)	Joël Schingtienne	22	3	4	9	1	0	3	0	0	34	4	4
24	DF	(Argentina)	Franco Russo	1	1	1	9	1	0	0	0	0	10	2	1
25	MF	(Belgium)	Manuel Osifo	0	0	0	0	0	2	0	0	0	0	0	2
28	DF	(Belgium)	Ewoud Pletinckx	30	0	0	3	1	0	3	0	0	36	1	0
30	MF	(Japan)	Takahiro Akimoto	2	3	4	10	0	0	0	0	0	12	3	4
33	MF	(Belgium)	Mathieu Maertens	5	12	1	8	2	0	1	1	0	14	15	1
38	GK	(Belgium)	Oregan Ravet	0	0	6	0	0	0	0	0	0	0	0	6
42	MF	(Belgium)	Jo Gilis	0	0	1	0	0	0	0	0	0	0	0	1
43	FW	(Belgium)	Nachon Nsingi	14	12	3	2	8	0	1	1	1	17	21	4
52	DF	(Belgium)	Richie Sagrado	21	3	0	6	1	0	2	0	0	29	4	0
63	DF	(Belgium)	Christ Souanga	0	0	0	0	1	6	0	0	0	0	1	6
77	MF	(Belgium)	Thibault Vlietinck	6	2	1	0	0	0	0	0	0	6	2	1
88	MF	(France)	Youssef Maziz	20	4	1	8	2	0	2	0	0	30	6	1
99	DF	(Belgium)	Davis Opoku	0	0	0	0	0	1	0	0	0	0	0	1
Players that have appeared this season, who are out on loan or have left OH Leuven
3	DF	(Israel)	Raz Shlomo (sold to Maccabi Tel Aviv)	5	3	6	0	0	0	2	1	0	7	4	6
10	MF	(Austria)	Raphael Holzhauser (released)	1	1	2	0	0	0	0	1	0	1	2	2
12	GK	(Romania)	Valentin Cojocaru (on loan to Pogoń Szczecin)	3	0	1	0	0	0	0	0	0	3	0	1
27	MF	(Belgium)	Mandela Keita (on loan to Antwerp)	1	0	0	0	0	0	0	0	0	1	0	0
40	MF	(Belgium)	Desmond Acquah (on loan to Dender EH)	0	0	1	0	0	0	0	1	0	0	1	1

=== Goalscorers ===
Rank	Pos.	No.	Player	Belgian Pro League Regular season	Belgian Pro League Playoffs	Belgian Cup	Total
1	MF	88	(France) Youssef Maziz	4	3	1	8
2	MF	7	(Iceland) Jón Dagur Þorsteinsson	4	3	0	7
3	MF	33	(Belgium) Mathieu Maertens	1	3	2	6
4	MF	8	(Belgium) Siebe Schrijvers	3	0	0	3
4	FW	9	(Norway) Jonatan Braut Brunes	3	0	0	3
4	MF	11	(Netherlands) Ezechiel Banzuzi	2	0	1	3
4	MF	20	(Morocco) Hamza Mendyl	3	0	0	3
4	DF	28	(Belgium) Ewoud Pletinckx	3	0	0	3
4	FW	43	(Belgium) Nachon Nsingi	2	1	0	3
10	DF	3	(Israel) Raz Shlomo	1	0	1	2
10	DF	18	(France) Florian Miguel	1	0	1	2
10	FW	21	(Ghana) Nathan Opoku	1	1	0	2
10	DF	52	(Belgium) Richie Sagrado	2	0	0	2
14	MF	6	(Belgium) Joren Dom	0	0	1	1
14	DF	14	(Uruguay) Federico Ricca	1	0	0	1
14	MF	15	(Ivory Coast) Konan N'Dri	0	0	1	1
14	MF	17	(Japan) Kento Misao	1	0	0	1
14	MF	19	(Thailand) Suphanat Mueanta	1	0	0	1
14	DF	23	(Belgium) Joël Schingtienne	1	0	0	1
14	DF	24	(Argentina) Franco Russo	0	1	0	1
Own Goals				0	0	0	0
Total				34	12	8	54

=== Assists ===
Rank	Pos.	No.	Player	Belgian Pro League Regular season	Belgian Pro League Playoffs	Belgian Cup	Total
1	MF	7	(Iceland) Jón Dagur Þorsteinsson	5	2	2	9
2	MF	88	(France) Youssef Maziz	5	2	0	7
3	FW	43	(Belgium) Nachon Nsingi	3	1	1	5
4	MF	8	(Belgium) Siebe Schrijvers	2	1	0	3
5	MF	15	(Ivory Coast) Konan N'Dri	1	0	1	2
5	MF	20	(Morocco) Hamza Mendyl	1	1	0	2
5	FW	21	(Ghana) Nathan Opoku	1	0	1	2
8	MF	6	(Belgium) Joren Dom	1	0	0	1
8	FW	9	(Norway) Jonatan Braut Brunes	1	0	0	1
8	MF	13	(Morocco) Sofian Kiyine	1	0	0	1
8	MF	17	(Japan) Kento Misao	1	0	0	1
8	DF	18	(France) Florian Miguel	1	0	0	1
8	DF	23	(Belgium) Joël Schingtienne	0	0	1	1
8	MF	30	(Japan) Takahiro Akimoto	0	1	0	1
8	MF	33	(Belgium) Mathieu Maertens	0	1	0	1
8	DF	52	(Belgium) Richie Sagrado	1	0	0	1
8	MF	77	(Belgium) Thibault Vlietinck	1	0	0	1
Total Assists				25	9	6	40
No Assist
Penalties				4	0	1	5
Own Goals				0	0	0	0
Without Assist				5	3	1	9
Total Goals Without Assist				9	3	2	14

=== Clean sheets ===
No.	Player	Belgian Pro League Regular season	Belgian Pro League Playoffs	Belgian Cup	Total clean sheets	% Clean sheet games	Goals conceded	Avg minutes between conceding
1	(Belgium) Tobe Leysen	5	2	1	8	30.77 %	29	80.69
12	(Romania) Valentin Cojocaru	0	0	0	0	0 %	8	33.75
16	(France) Maxence Prévot	2	1	0	3	21.43 %	24	52.5
38	(Belgium) Oregan Ravet	0	0	0	0	NA	0	NA
