= 2019–20 Dijon FCO season =

Dijon
2019–20 season
- President: Olivier Delcourt
- Head coach: Stéphane Jobard
- Stadium: Stade Gaston Gérard
- Ligue 1: 16th
- Coupe de France: Quarter-finals
- Coupe de la Ligue: Round of 32
- Top goalscorer: League: Stephy Mavididi (5); All: Stephy Mavididi (8)
- Highest home attendance: 15,061 (vs Marseille, 24 September 2019)
- Lowest home attendance: 11,413 (vs Nîmes, 14 September 2019)
- Average home league attendance: 12,870
- Biggest win: League: Dijon 3–0 Brest (1 February 2020); All: Dijon 5–0 Nîmes (19 January 2020, CdF)
- Biggest defeat: League: PSG 4–0 Dijon (29 February 2020); All: Dijon 1–6 PSG (12 February 2020, CdF)
Home colours	Away colours	Third colours

The 2019–20 season was Dijon Football Côte d'Or's 22nd season in existence and the club's 4th consecutive season in the top flight of French football. In addition to the domestic league, Dijon participated in this season's editions of the Coupe de France, and the Coupe de la Ligue. The season covered the period from 1 July 2019 to 30 June 2020.

== Players ==
=== Squad ===
As of 31 January 2020.

Note: Flags indicate national team as defined under FIFA eligibility rules; some limited exceptions apply. Players may hold more than one non-FIFA nationality.

No.	Pos.	Nation	Player
1	GK	ISL	Rúnar Alex Rúnarsson
2	DF	GLP	Mickaël Alphonse
3	DF	COD	Ngonda Muzinga
4	DF	MAR	Nayef Aguerd
5	DF	FRA	Senou Coulibaly
6	MF	ALG	Yassine Benzia
7	MF	FRA	Frédéric Sammaritano
8	MF	FRA	Bryan Soumaré
9	FW	ENG	Stephy Mavididi (on loan from Juventus)
11	FW	CPV	Júlio Tavares (captain)
14	MF	FRA	Jordan Marié
15	MF	FRA	Florent Balmont

No.	Pos.	Nation	Player
16	GK	SEN	Alfred Gomis
17	MF	GBS	Mama Baldé
19	MF	VEN	Jhonder Cádiz (on loan from Benfica)
20	MF	FRA	Romain Amalfitano
21	FW	FRA	Mounir Chouiar
22	MF	GAB	Didier Ndong
24	DF	NCL	Wesley Lautoa
25	DF	GAB	Bruno Ecuele Manga
26	DF	MAR	Fouad Chafik
27	DF	MAR	Hamza Mendyl (on loan from Schalke)
30	GK	FRA	Lévi Ntumba
31	FW	FRA	Rayan Philippe

=== Out of squad ===
Note: Flags indicate national team as defined under FIFA eligibility rules; some limited exceptions apply. Players may hold more than one non-FIFA nationality.

No.	Pos.	Nation	Player
—	DF	FRA	Théo Barbet

=== Out on loan ===
Note: Flags indicate national team as defined under FIFA eligibility rules; some limited exceptions apply. Players may hold more than one non-FIFA nationality.

No.	Pos.	Nation	Player
12	MF	FRA	Enzo Loiodice (at Wolves until end of 2019/20 season, with an option to buy)
—	FW	FRA	Aurélien Scheidler (at US Orléans until end of 2019/20 season)

=== Reserve team ===
As of 20 March 2020

Note: Flags indicate national team as defined under FIFA eligibility rules; some limited exceptions apply. Players may hold more than one non-FIFA nationality.

No.	Pos.	Nation	Player
—	GK	FRA	Mathis Malandre
—	DF	FRA	Théo Barbet
—	DF	ALG	Reda Maarif
—	DF	FRA	Maël Sedagondji
—	DF	FRA	Dylan Tchamajieu
—	DF	FRA	Antoine Tchong
—	DF	FRA	Arthur Vitelli
—	DF	CMR	Ahmad Ngouyamsa
—	MF	FRA	Hugo Coldefy

No.	Pos.	Nation	Player
—	MF	FRA	Corentin Faussot
—	MF	FRA	Théo Godard
—	MF	FRA	Noé Messin
—	MF	FRA	Steve Solvet
—	FW	FRA	Clément Billemaz
—	FW	FRA	Sory Doumbouya
—	FW	FRA	Marco Ateba
—	FW	FRA	Rayan Philippe
—	FW	FRA	Cheick Touré

== Pre-season and friendlies ==
Win Draw Loss

13 July 2019 Friendly	Dijon (France)	2–1	(France) Auxerre	Dole, France
17:00 CEST (UTC+2)				Stadium: Stade Municipal Robert Bobin

16 July 2019 Friendly	Paris (France)	0–1	(France) Dijon	Migennes, France
17:00 CEST (UTC+2)				Stadium: Stade Lucien Masson

20 July 2019 Friendly	Nancy (France)	2–2	(France) Dijon	Tomblaine, France
19:00 CEST (UTC+2)				Stadium: Stade Marcel-Picot

27 July 2019 Friendly	Dijon (France)	1–3	(France) Reims	Dijon, France
18:00 CEST (UTC+2)	Manga 52'		Doumbia 43'; Mbuku 57'; Suk 90+2'	Stadium: Stade Gaston Gérard

3 August 2019 Friendly	Nîmes (France)	0–2	(France) Dijon	Vauvert, France
18:00 CEST (UTC+2)			Baldé 6'; Jeannot 19' (pen.)	Stadium: Stade de Vauvert

== Competitions ==
=== Overview ===
Competition	First match	Last match	Starting round	Final position	Record							
Competition	First match	Last match	Starting round	Final position	Pld	W	D	L	GF	GA	GD	Win %
Ligue 1	10 August 2019	7 March 2020	Matchday 1	16th	28	7	9	12	27	37	−10	25.00
Coupe de France	5 January 2020	12 February 2020	Round of 64	Quarter-finals	4	3	0	1	10	8	+2	75.00
Coupe de la Ligue	29 October 2019		Round of 32	Round of 32	1	0	0	1	0	2	−2	0.00
Total					33	10	9	14	37	47	−10	30.30

Source: Soccerway

=== Ligue 1 ===
==== League table ====
Pos	Team	Pld	W	D	L	GF	GA	GD	Pts	PPG
14	Brest	28	8	10	10	34	37	−3	34	1.21
15	Metz	28	8	10	10	27	35	−8	34	1.21
16	Dijon	28	7	9	12	27	37	−10	30	1.07
17	Saint-Étienne	28	8	6	14	29	45	−16	30	1.07
18	Nîmes (Note: Originally, the 18th-placed Ligue 1 team would play in promotion-relegation play-offs at the end of the season with a team from Ligue 2 to decide whether they would remain in Ligue 1 for the 2020–21 season, but the play-offs were cancelled and the 18th-placed team remained in Ligue 1.)	28	7	6	15	29	44	−15	27	0.96

Source: Ligue 1
Rules for classification: 1) Points per game; 2) Head-to-head points; 3) Head-to-head goal difference; 4) Goal difference; 5) Goals scored; 6) Fairplay ranking.

==== Results summary ====
Overall								Home						Away					
Pld	W	D	L	GF	GA	GD	Pts	W	D	L	GF	GA	GD	W	D	L	GF	GA	GD
28	7	9	12	27	37	−10	30	6	6	2	20	15	+5	1	3	10	7	22	−15

Source: Ligue 1

==== Results by round ====
Round	1	2	3	4	5	6	7	8	9	10	11	12	13	14	15	16	17	18	19	20	21	22	23	24	25	26	27	28	29	30	31	32	33	34	35	36	37	38
Ground	H	A	H	A	H	A	H	A	H	A	A	H	A	H	A	H	A	A	H	H	A	H	A	H	A	H	A	H	A	H	A	H	A	H	A	H	A	H
Result	L	L	L	L	D	L	D	W	W	D	L	W	L	W	L	D	L	D	D	W	L	W	L	D	D	D	L	W	C	C	C	C	C	C	C	C	C	C
Position	15	18	20	20	20	20	20	20	19	19	20	17	18	17	18	16	16	16	16	16	17	17	17	17	18	17	17	16	16	16	16	16	16	16	16	16	16	16

Source: Ligue 1
A = Away; H = Home; W = Win; D = Draw; L = Loss; C = Cancelled

==== Matches ====
The Ligue 1 schedule was announced on 14 June 2019. The Ligue 1 matches were suspended by the LFP on 13 March 2020 due to COVID-19 until further notices. On 28 April 2020, it was announced that Ligue 1 and Ligue 2 campaigns would not resume, after the country banned all sporting events until September. On 30 April, The LFP ended officially the 2019–20 season.

10 August 2019 1	Dijon	1–2	Saint-Étienne	Dijon
20:00 CEST (UTC+2)	Tavares 34' (pen.)	Report	Hamouma 5'; Aholou 11', (yellow card) 46'; Debuchy (yellow card) 33'	Stadium: Stade Gaston Gérard; Attendance: 14,334; Referee: Thomas Leonard

17 August 2019 2	Toulouse	1–0	Dijon	Toulouse
20:00 CEST (UTC+2)	Vainqueur (yellow card) 29'; Makengo 54'; Moreira (yellow card) 59'	Report		Stadium: Stadium de Toulouse; Attendance: 10,583; Referee: Ruddy Buquet

24 August 2019 3	Dijon	0–2	Bordeaux	Dijon
20:00 CEST (UTC+2)		Report	Hwang 11'; Benito 47'; Kwateng (yellow card) 69'; Costil (yellow card) 90+2'	Stadium: Stade Gaston Gérard; Attendance: 12,471; Referee: François Letexier

31 August 2019 4	Angers	2–0	Dijon	Angers
20:00 CEST (UTC+2)	Muzinga 50' (o.g.); El Melali 71'	Report	Baldé (yellow card) 43'; Muzinga (yellow card) 86'	Stadium: Stade Raymond Kopa; Attendance: 8,988; Referee: Jérémie Pignard

14 September 2019 5	Dijon	0–0	Nîmes	Dijon
20:00 CEST (UTC+2)	Mendyl (yellow card) 35'; Pereira (yellow card) 44'; Aguerd (yellow card) 77'	Report	Miguel (yellow card) 87'	Stadium: Stade Gaston Gérard; Attendance: 11,413; Referee: Stéphanie Frappart

21 September 2019 6	Nice	2–1	Dijon	Nice
20:00 CEST (UTC+2)	Dolberg 30'; Atal 47', (yellow card) 61'; Sarr (yellow card) 73'	Report	Tavares 22'; Aguerd (yellow card) 44'; Amalfitano (yellow card) 86'; Lautoa (yellow card) 89'	Stadium: Allianz Riviera; Attendance: 16,255; Referee: Willy Delajod

24 September 2019 7	Dijon	0–0	Marseille	Dijon
19:00 CEST (UTC+2)	Chouiar (yellow card) 54'; Mendyl (yellow card) 69'; Pereira (yellow card) 90+1'	Report	Perrin (yellow card) 71'; Sanson (yellow card) 74'; Germain (yellow card) 76'	Stadium: Stade Gaston Gérard; Attendance: 15,061; Referee: Jérémy Stinat

28 September 2019 8	Reims	1–2	Dijon	Reims
20:00 CEST (UTC+2)	Chavalerin 17'; Disasi (yellow card) 30'	Report	Tavares 19'; Lautoa (yellow card) 43'; Baldé 48'; Ndong (yellow card) 72'	Stadium: Stade Auguste Delaune; Attendance: 11,033; Referee: Jérémie Pignard

5 October 2019 9	Dijon	1–0	Strasbourg	Dijon
20:00 CEST (UTC+2)	Pereira (yellow card) 29'; Mendyl (yellow card) 36'; Mavididi 38'; Cádiz (yellow card) 90'	Report	Djiku (yellow card) 64'; Sissoko (yellow card) 78'; Mitrović (yellow card) 88'	Stadium: Stade Gaston Gérard; Attendance: 12,124; Referee: Olivier Thual

19 October 2019 10	Lyon	0–0	Dijon	Décines-Charpieu
17:30 CEST (UTC+2)		Report		Stadium: Parc Olympique Lyonnais; Attendance: 48,454; Referee: Frank Schneider

26 October 2019 11	Brest	2–0	Dijon	Brest
20:00 CEST (UTC+2)	Lasne 49'; Bain 52', (red card) 70'	Report		Stadium: Stade Francis-Le Blé; Attendance: 14,232; Referee: Jérémie Pignard

1 November 2019 12	Dijon	2–1	Paris Saint-Germain	Dijon
20:45 CET (UTC+1)	Ndong (yellow card) 12'; Cádiz (yellow card) 14', (goal) 47'; Chouiar 45+6'; Mendyl (yellow card) 58'	Report	Kimpembe (yellow card) 15'; Mbappé 19'; Draxler (yellow card) 90+2'	Stadium: Stade Gaston Gérard; Attendance: 14,859; Referee: Ruddy Buquet

9 November 2019 13	Monaco	1–0	Dijon	Monaco
20:00 CET (UTC+1)	Henrichs (yellow card) 30'; Golovin 42', (yellow card) 50'	Report		Stadium: Stade Louis II; Attendance: 5,223; Referee: Eric Wattellier

23 November 2019 14	Dijon	2–1	Rennes	Dijon
20:00 CET (UTC+1)	Ndong (yellow card) 67'; Sammaritano 70'; Chouiar 83'	Report	Hunou (yellow card) 20'; Raphinha 59'; Traoré (yellow card) 62'	Stadium: Stade Gaston Gérard; Attendance: 12,084; Referee: Jérôme Brisard

30 November 2019 15	Lille	1–0	Dijon	Villeneuve-d'Ascq
20:00 CET (UTC+1)	Pied (yellow card) 42'; Osimhen 45+6' (pen.); Reinildo (yellow card) 80'	Report	Ecuele Manga (yellow card) 51'	Stadium: Stade Pierre-Mauroy; Attendance: 40,074; Referee: Jérémy Stinat

4 December 2019 16	Dijon	2–2	Montpellier	Dijon
19:00 CET (UTC+1)	Sambia 2' (o.g.); Mendyl (yellow card) 34'; Amalfitano (yellow card) 43'; Chafik (yellow card) 55'; Mavididi 72'	Report	Mollet 15'; Savanier 30', (yellow card) 76'; Vidal (yellow card) 61'; Le Tallec (yellow card) 78'	Stadium: Stade Gaston Gérard; Attendance: 11,926; Referee: François Letexier

8 December 2019 17	Nantes	1–0	Dijon	Nantes
17:00 CET (UTC+1)	Pallois (yellow card) 70'; Blas 73'	Report	Balmont (yellow card) 50'; Pereira (yellow card) 57'	Stadium: Stade de la Beaujoire; Attendance: 16,001; Referee: Hakim Ben El Hadj

14 December 2019 18	Amiens	1–1	Dijon	Amiens
20:00 CET (UTC+1)	Akolo (yellow card) 9'; Konaté 28'	Report	Cádiz 19'; Chouiar (yellow card) 44'; Alphonse (yellow card) 62'; Amalfitano (yellow card) 77'	Stadium: Stade de la Licorne; Attendance: 10,530; Referee: Thomas Leonard

21 December 2019 19	Dijon	2–2	Metz	Dijon
20:45 CET (UTC+1)	Amalfitano 18', (yellow card) 87'; Baldé 42'; Mendyl (yellow card) 71'	Report	Diallo 14'; Udol (yellow card) 45'; Sunzu (red card) 53'; Maïga 90+1', (yellow card) 90+2'	Stadium: Stade Gaston Gérard; Attendance: 12,309; Referee: Johan Hamel

12 January 2020 20	Dijon	1–0	Lille	Dijon
17:00 CET (UTC+1)	Mendyl (red card) 21'; Chouiar (yellow card) 38'; Tavares 47'; Ngouyamsa (yellow card) 72'	Report	Soumaré (yellow card) 41' (yellow-red card) 67'; Xeka (yellow card) 49'; Bradarić (yellow card) 71'	Stadium: Stade Gaston Gérard; Attendance: 12,115; Referee: Frank Schneider

25 January 2020 21	Montpellier	2–1	Dijon	Montpellier
20:00 CET (UTC+1)	Delort (yellow card) 33', (goal) 63'; Congré (yellow card) 48'; Mollet 56'	Report	Chouiar (yellow card) 19' (yellow-red card) 54'; Baldé 76'	Stadium: Stade de la Mosson; Attendance: 11,129; Referee: Jérôme Miguelgorry

1 February 2020 22	Dijon	3–0	Brest	Dijon
20:00 CET (UTC+1)	Baldé 3', 20'; Mavididi 77'	Report	Autret (yellow card) 63'	Stadium: Stade Gaston Gérard; Attendance: 11,212; Referee: Olivier Thual

5 February 2020 23	Nîmes	2–0	Dijon	Nîmes
19:00 CET (UTC+1)	Benrahou 4'; Roux 44'	Report	Amalfitano (yellow card) 1'; Ndong (yellow card) 37'; Cádiz (yellow card) 87'	Stadium: Stade des Costières; Attendance: 11,705; Referee: Florent Batta

8 February 2020 24	Dijon	3–3	Nantes	Dijon
20:00 CET (UTC+1)	Mavididi 15', 90'; Tavares 24'; Alphonse (yellow card) 53'; Lautoa (yellow card) 77'	Report	Simon 20'; Alphonse 34' (o.g.); Prado (yellow card) 35'; Louza (yellow card) 71'; Girotto 90+2'	Stadium: Stade Gaston Gérard; Attendance: 11,780; Referee: Jérémie Pignard

15 February 2020 25	Bordeaux	2–2	Dijon	Bordeaux
20:00 CET (UTC+1)	Hwang 35'; Benito (yellow card) 38'; Briand 64'	Report	Ndong (yellow card) 10'; Chouiar 16', 72'	Stadium: Matmut Atlantique; Attendance: 13,701; Referee: Mikael Lesage

22 February 2020 26	Dijon	1–1	Monaco	Dijon
20:00 CET (UTC+1)	Baldé 56'; Ecuele Manga (yellow card) 90'	Report	Maripán 79'	Stadium: Stade Gaston Gérard; Attendance: 13,657; Referee: François Letexier

29 February 2020 27	Paris Saint-Germain	4–0	Dijon	Paris
17:30 CET (UTC+1)	Sarabia 3'; Bernat (yellow card) 16'; Mbappé 74', 90+1'; Icardi 76'	Report		Stadium: Parc des Princes; Attendance: 47,542; Referee: Thomas Léonard

7 March 2020 28	Dijon	2–1	Toulouse	Dijon
20:00 CET (UTC+1)	Baldé (yellow card) 12'; Mendyl 40', (yellow card) 45'; Aguerd 53'	Report	Gradel (yellow card) 12'; Koulouris (yellow card) 17'; Boisgard 41'	Stadium: Stade Gaston Gérard; Attendance: 12,549; Referee: Jérôme Brisard

29	Strasbourg	Cancelled	Dijon	Strasbourg
--:-- CET (UTC+1)				Stadium: Stade de la Meinau; Attendance: 0

30	Dijon	Cancelled	Amiens	Dijon
--:-- CET (UTC+1)				Stadium: Stade Gaston Gérard; Attendance: 0

31	Dijon	Cancelled	Nice	Dijon
--:-- CEST (UTC+2)				Stadium: Stade Gaston Gérard; Attendance: 0

32	Marseille	Cancelled	Dijon	Marseille
--:-- CEST (UTC+2)				Stadium: Stade Vélodrome

33	Dijon	Cancelled	Angers	Dijon
--:-- CEST (UTC+2)				Stadium: Stade Gaston Gérard

34	Metz	Cancelled	Dijon	Metz
--:-- CEST (UTC+2)				Stadium: Stade Saint-Symphorien

35	Dijon	Cancelled	Lyon	Dijon
--:-- CEST (UTC+2)				Stadium: Stade Gaston Gérard

36	Rennes	Cancelled	Dijon	Rennes
--:-- CEST (UTC+2)				Stadium: Roazhon Park

37	Dijon	Cancelled	Reims	Dijon
--:-- CEST (UTC+2)				Stadium: Stade Gaston Gérard

38	Saint-Étienne	Cancelled	Dijon	Saint-Étienne
--:-- CEST (UTC+2)				Stadium: Stade Geoffroy-Guichard

=== Coupe de France ===
5 January 2020 Round of 64	Valenciennes	1–2	Dijon	Valenciennes
17:15 CET (UTC+1)	Chevalier 18' (pen.)	Report	Sammaritano 14'; Baldé (yellow card) 45+1'; Lautoa (yellow card) 61', (goal) 74'	Stadium: Stade du Hainaut; Attendance: 3,421; Referee: Benoît Bastien

19 January 2020 Round of 32	Dijon	5–0	Nîmes	Dijon
17:15 CET (UTC+1)	Cádiz 18' (pen.); Chafik (yellow card) 69'; Chouiar (yellow card) 72', (goal) 79'; Mavididi 75', 90'; Manga 86'	Report	Guessoum (yellow card) 40'; Sarr (yellow card) 59'; Paquiez (yellow card) 62'	Stadium: Stade Gaston Gérard; Attendance: 7,964; Referee: Hakim Ben El Hadj

28 January 2020 Round of 16	FC Limonest	1–2 (a.e.t.)	Dijon	Décines-Charpieu
18:30 CET (UTC+1)	Bouzit 49'; Rouvière (yellow card) 54'; Dutreive (yellow card) 83'	Report	Lautoa (yellow card) 54'; Cádiz 55'; Mendyl (yellow card) 56'; Coulibaly (yellow card) 59'; Mavididi 120+1'	Stadium: Stade Groupama Training Center; Attendance: 2,600; Referee: Karim Abed

12 February 2020 Quarter-finals	Dijon	1–6	Paris Saint-Germain	Dijon
18:30 CET (UTC+1)	Chouiar 13'	Report	Lautoa 1' (o.g.); Mbappé 44'; Thiago Silva 50'; Sarabia 56', 90+1'; Coulibaly 86' (o.g.)	Stadium: Stade Gaston Gérard; Attendance: 14,193; Referee: Benoît Bastien

=== Coupe de la Ligue ===
29 October 2019 Round of 32	Bordeaux	2–0	Dijon	Bordeaux
21:05 CET (UTC+1)	Maja 8'; Benito (yellow card) 40'; Otávio (yellow card) 43'; Kalu (yellow card) 88'; De Préville 90+4'	Report	Cádiz (yellow card) 20'	Stadium: Matmut Atlantique; Attendance: 11,391; Referee: Thomas Léonard
