= Hamza Mendyl =

Moroccan footballer (born 1997)

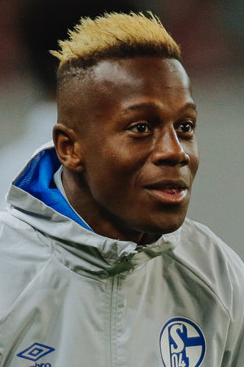
- Mendyl with Schalke 04 in 2018

Personal information
- Date of birth: 21 October 1997 (age 29)
- Place of birth: Casablanca, Morocco
- Height: 1.79 m (5 ft 10 in)
- Position: Left-back

Team information
- Current team: Volos
- Number: 37

Youth career
- 2002–2010: Wydad AC
- 2010–2015: Mohammed VI Academy
- 2016–2017: Lille

Senior career*
Years	Team	Apps	(Gls)
2016–2017	Lille II	26	(1)
2017–2018	Lille	13	(0)
2018–2022	Schalke 04	12	(0)
2019–2020	→ Dijon (loan)	18	(1)
2021–2022	→ Gaziantep (loan)	22	(1)
2022–2025	OH Leuven	60	(3)
2025–2026	Aris	23	(1)
2026–	Volos	4	(0)

International career
2015	Morocco U19	1	(0)
2015–2016	Morocco U20	6	(1)
2016–2020	Morocco	20	(0)
- * Club domestic league appearances and goals as of 20 September 2026

Hamza Mendyl (Arabic: حمزة منديل; born 21 October 1997) is a Moroccan professional footballer who plays as a left-back for Super League Greece club Volos.

He also holds citizenship of the Ivory Coast.

== Club career ==
=== Lille ===
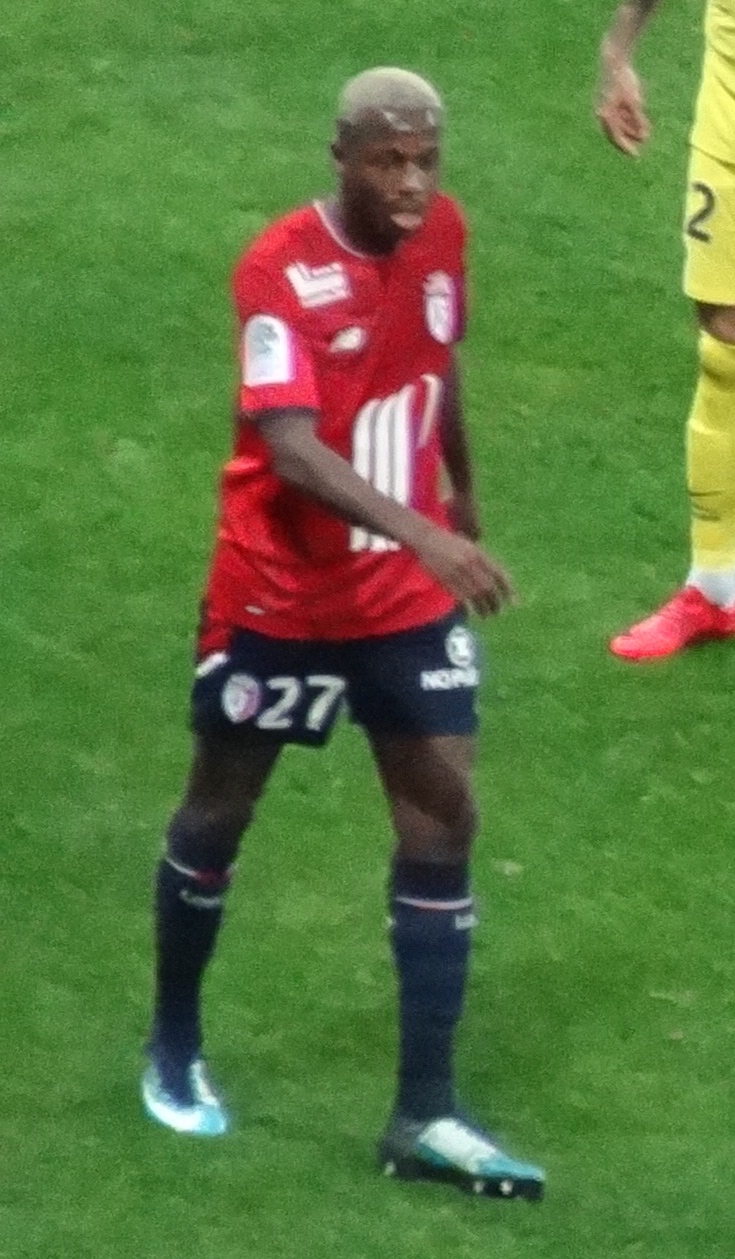
Mendyl with Lille in 2017.

In March 2016, the two clubs reached an agreement for a one-season loan to Lille, where he played for the reserve team. He made 26 appearances for the B team, scoring one goal.

In 2017, he signed his first professional contract with the Lille club, on a five-year deal running until June 30, 2021. Mendyl made his professional debut on February 18, 2017, on the 26th matchday of Ligue 1 against Caen, coming on in the 79th minute in a 1–0 victory. He made his first start in a Coupe de France match against Bergerac on March 2, 2017.

On October 21, 2017, on his birthday, his coach brought him on in the second half of the league match against Rennes, where he received a red card in the 87th minute.

At the beginning of the 2017–18 season, he established himself as a starter for Lille, but he was soon the subject of interest from major clubs during the opening stages of the summer 2018 transfer window, including Arsenal, PSV Eindhoven, and Schalke 04.

=== Schalke 04 ===
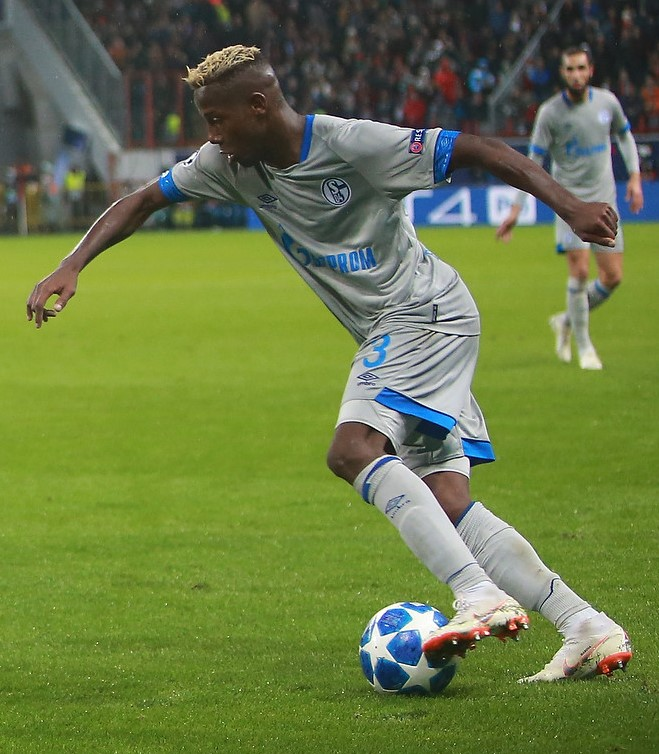
Mendyl in action in the UEFA Champions League in 2018.

During the summer 2018 transfer window, English club Arsenal showed interest in the young Moroccan talent. German club Schalke 04 also considered signing him to play on the left flank, where the long-term absence of Bastian Oczipka, who had undergone surgery for a groin injury, had created a problem. Lille, under pressure from the financial control authorities, eventually decided to sell the Moroccan international, who joined the German club on August 17, 2018, signing a five-year contract for a transfer fee of €7 million.

On September 15, 2018, Domenico Tedesco decided to start Hamza Mendyl in his first appearance for Schalke 04, in a match against Borussia Mönchengladbach. After a disastrous start marked by several harsh tackles and having already received a yellow card, the coach decided to substitute him in the 25th minute, bringing on Alessandro Schöpf instead. Schalke went on to lose the match 3–1. In his second match, he was again named in the starting lineup alongside his Moroccan national-team teammate Amine Harit in a game against Freiburg, playing the full 90 minutes in a 1–0 defeat.

On October 3, 2018, he started his first UEFA Champions League match away against Lokomotiv Moscow, playing the full 90 minutes in a 1–0 victory. In December 2018, the player suffered an injury during a league match and was sidelined for two months.

On February 21, 2019, he returned from injury by starting in the Champions League round of 16 against Manchester City. During the match, he was deployed as a center forward, despite being a natural left-back. The match ended in a 3–2 defeat at home.

==== Dijon (Loan) ====
On 21 August 2019, he was loaned to Dijon for one season with an option to buy. His devastating dribbling and offensive contribution made him an undisputed starter in his position during his only season at Dijon, where he competed with Ngonda Muzinga for the spot. His main weaknesses were defensive, as evidenced by the 7 yellow cards and 1 red card he received in 20 appearances in all competitions.

He scored his first professional goal against Toulouse on matchday 28 of the league, in a 2–1 victory for his side. He returned to Schalke 04 at the end of his loan spell.

=== Aris Thessaloniki ===
On 16 January 2025, Mendyl signed a contract with Aris Thessaloniki in Greece until 30 June 2026, with an option to extend for an additional year.

== International career ==
Mendyl was born in Casablanca, Morocco to an Ivorian father and a Moroccan mother. He played for various youth Moroccan sides, before debuting for the senior Morocco national football team in a 2–0 2017 Africa Cup of Nations qualification win over São Tomé and Príncipe.

In 2017 he was named in Morocco's 23-man squad for the 2017 Africa Cup of Nations in Gabon.

In May 2018 he was named in Morocco's 23-man squad for the 2018 FIFA World Cup in Russia.

In 2019 He was named in Morocco's squad for the 2019 Africa Cup of Nations.

== Personal life ==
Mendyl married Moroccan Instagram star Maroua Ourahali in late 2018. They had their honeymoon in the Maldives and now have a son together called Cayden, who was born on 20 February 2020. Hamza is a close friend of fellow footballer Amine Harit.

== Career statistics ==
=== Club ===
As of 5 July 2026

Club	Season	League			National Cup		League Cup (Note: Appearances in Coupe de la Ligue)		Europe (Note: Appearances in UEFA Champions League)		Total	
Club	Season	Division	Apps	Goals	Apps	Goals	Apps	Goals	Apps	Goals	Apps	Goals
Lille	2016–17	Ligue 1	1	0	1	0	0	0	—		2	0
Lille	2017–18	Ligue 1	12	0	1	0	1	0	—		14	0
Lille	Total		13	0	2	0	1	0	—		16	0
Schalke 04	2018–19	Bundesliga	9	0	1	0	—		6	0	16	0
Schalke 04	2020–21	Bundesliga	3	0	2	0	—		—		5	0
Schalke 04	Total		12	0	3	0	—		6	0	21	0
Dijon (loan)	2019–20	Ligue 1	18	1	2	0	0	0	—		20	1
Gaziantep (loan)	2021–22	Süper Lig	22	1	1	0	—		—		23	1
OH Leuven	2022–23	Belgian Pro League	28	0	2	0	—		—		30	0
OH Leuven	2023–24	Belgian Pro League	26	3	1	0	—		—		27	3
OH Leuven	2024–25	Belgian Pro League	12	0	2	0	—		—		14	0
OH Leuven	Total		66	3	5	0	—		—		71	3
Aris	2024–25	Superleague Greece	12	1	0	0	—		—		12	1
Aris	2025–26	Superleague Greece	11	0	1	0	—		2	0	14	0
Aris	Total		23	1	1	0	—		2	0	26	1
Career total			154	6	14	0	1	0	8	0	177	6

=== International ===
As of match played 13 October 2020

National team	Year	Apps	Goals
Morocco	2016	5	0
Morocco	2017	5	0
Morocco	2018	5	0
Morocco	2019	3	0
Morocco	2020	2	0
Total		20	0
