= Jhonder Cádiz =

Venezuelan footballer (born 1995)

Personal information
- Full name: Jhonder Leonel Cádiz Fernández
- Date of birth: 29 July 1995 (age 31)
- Place of birth: Caracas, Venezuela
- Height: 1.91 m (6 ft 3 in)
- Position: Forward

Team information
- Current team: Wuhan Three Towns
- Number: 29

Youth career
- 2011–2012: Deportivo Petare

Senior career*
Years	Team	Apps	(Gls)
2011–2013	Deportivo Petare	3	(0)
2014–2015	Caracas	33	(7)
2015–2016	→ União da Madeira (loan)	23	(2)
2016–2017	Nacional	11	(1)
2017	Moreirense	18	(2)
2018	Monagas	11	(7)
2018–2019	Vitória Setúbal	31	(9)
2019–2022	Benfica	9	(4)
2019–2020	→ Dijon (loan)	17	(2)
2020–2021	→ Nashville SC (loan)	32	(6)
2022–2024	Famalicão	68	(20)
2024–2026	León	34	(13)
2025–2026	→ Pachuca (loan)	18	(2)
2026–	Wuhan Three Towns	30	(22)

International career^{‡}
2011–2013	Venezuela U17	8	(0)
2013	Venezuela U20	4	(0)
2018–	Venezuela	19	(2)
- * Club domestic league appearances and goals as of 8 November 2026 ‡ National team caps and goals as of 2 October 2026

Jhonder Leonel Cádiz Fernández (born 29 July 1995) is a Venezuelan professional footballer who plays as a forward for Chinese Super League club Wuhan Three Towns and the Venezuela national team.

== Club career ==
A product of Deportivo Petare's youth system, Cádiz made his professional debut in Deportivo Petare's 0–0 Primera División draw against Atlético El Vigía on 29 March 2012. He spent two seasons playing for Caracas FC.

Cádiz was loaned to Portuguese club C.F. União on 3 July 2015. A year later, he moved to fellow Madeira club C.D. Nacional, signing a three-year deal. On 28 June 2019, Portuguese champions Benfica announced that Cádiz had signed a five-year contract with the club. He was then loaned out to Dijon for one season. On 8 September, Cádiz joined MLS side Nashville SC on loan until 30 June 2021. On 29 June 2021, his contract for the U.S. club has been extended. Following the 2021 season Cádiz's purchase option was declined by Nashville and he returned to Benfica. However, Cádiz did not stay at the club, as on 31 January 2022 he signed with Famalicão of the Primeira Liga.

In July 2024, Cádiz signed with the Liga MX team Club León. A year later, in July 2025, he was loaned to the Liga MX side Pachuca, a team owned by the same person as León.

In February 2026, Cádiz signed with Wuhan Three Towns, a team that plays in the Chinese Super League.

== International career ==
On 23 May 2013, Cádiz was called up to the senior Venezuela national team for a friendly match against El Salvador, but he did not play.

== Career statistics ==
=== Club ===
As of match played 8 November 2026

Appearances and goals by club, season and competition
Club	Season	League			National cup		League cup		Continental		Other		Total	
Club	Season	Division	Apps	Goals	Apps	Goals	Apps	Goals	Apps	Goals	Apps	Goals	Apps	Goals
Deportivo Petare	2011–12	Liga FUTVE	2	0	—		—		—		—		2	0
Deportivo Petare	2012–13	Liga FUTVE	1	0	—		—		—		—		1	0
Deportivo Petare	Total		3	0	—		—		—		—		3	0
Caracas	2013–14	Liga FUTVE	1	1	—		—		—		—		1	1
Caracas	2014–15	Liga FUTVE	32	6	—		—		3 (Note: Appearance(s) in Copa Sudamericana)	0	—		35	6
Caracas	Total		33	7	—		—		3	0	—		36	7
União da Madeira(loan)	2015–16	Primeira Liga	23	2	1	2	1	0	—		—		25	4
Nacional	2016–17	Primeira Liga	11	1	1	0	0	0	—		—		12	1
Moreirense	2017–18	Primeira Liga	18	2	1	0	3	0	—		—		22	2
Monagas	2018	Liga FUTVE	11	7	—		—		6 (Note: Appearance(s) in Copa Libertadores)	1	—		17	8
Vitória Setúbal	2018–19	Primeira Liga	31	9	2	1	1	0	—		—		34	10
Benfica	2019–20	Primeira Liga	0	0	0	0	0	0	—		—		0	0
Benfica	2020–21	Primeira Liga	0	0	0	0	0	0	—		—		0	0
Benfica	Total		0	0	0	0	0	0	0	0	—		0	0
Dijon (loan)	2019–20	Ligue 1	17	2	4	2	1	0	—		—		22	4
Nashville SC (loan)	2020	MLS	7	2	—		—		—		3 (Note: Appearance(s) in MLS Cup Playoffs)	0	10	2
Nashville SC (loan)	2021	MLS	23	2	0	0	—		—		—		23	2
Nashville SC (loan)	Total		30	4	0	0	—		—		3	0	33	4
Famalicão	2021–22	Primeira Liga	14	1	0	0	0	0	—		—		14	1
Famalicão	2022–23	Primeira Liga	24	4	6	6	4	1	—		—		34	11
Famalicão	2023–24	Primeira Liga	30	15	1	0	1	1	—		—		32	16
Famalicão	Total		68	20	7	6	5	2	—		—		80	28
León	2024–25	Liga MX	34	13	0	0	—		—		2 (Note: Appearances in Leagues Cup)	0	36	13
Pachuca (loan)	2025–26	Liga MX	20	3	0	0	—		—		3	0	23	3
Wuhan Three Towns	2026	Chinese Super League	30	22	1	1	—		—		—		31	23
Career total			329	92	17	12	11	2	9	1	5	0	374	107

=== International ===
As of match played 2 October 2026

Appearances and goals by national team and year
National team	Year	Apps	Goals
Venezuela	2018	1	0
Venezuela	2019	1	0
Venezuela	2021	2	0
Venezuela	2024	11	1
Venezuela	2025	3	1
Venezuela	2026	1	0
Total		19	2

Scores and results list Venezuela's goal tally first, score column indicates score after each Cádiz goal.

List of international goals scored by Jhonder Cádiz
No.	Date	Venue	Opponent	Score	Result	Competition
1	22 June 2024	Levi's Stadium, Santa Clara, United States	Ecuador	1–1	2–1	2024 Copa América
2	21 March 2025	Estadio Rodrigo Paz Delgado, Quito, Ecuador	Ecuador	1–2	1–2	2026 FIFA World Cup qualification
