= Richie Sagrado =

Belgian footballer (born 2004)

Personal information
- Full name: Richie Sagrado Sebastiao
- Date of birth: 30 January 2004 (age 22)
- Place of birth: Belgium
- Height: 1.82 m (6 ft 0 in)
- Position: Right-back

Team information
- Current team: Venezia
- Number: 20

Youth career
- –2018: Seraing
- 2018–2021: Genk
- 2021–2022: OH Leuven

Senior career*
Years	Team	Apps	(Gls)
2022–2023	OH Leuven U23	20	(0)
2023–2024	OH Leuven	34	(2)
2024–	Venezia	35	(2)

International career
2019–2020	Belgium U16	5	(0)
2021–2022	Belgium U18	9	(0)
2022–2023	Belgium U19	3	(0)
2024–	Belgium U21	4	(0)
- * Club domestic league appearances and goals as of 09:39, 13 September 2026 (UTC)

Richie Sagrado Sebastiao (born 30 January 2004) is a Belgian professional footballer who plays as a right-back for Serie A club Venezia.

== Club career ==
Sagrado made his professional debut for OH Leuven on 10 March 2023 when he was subbed on for Musa Al-Taamari with about 20 minutes to play in an away match against Charleroi.

On 3 August 2024, Sagrado signed a contract with Venezia in Italy for four seasons, with an optional fifth season.

== International career ==
Born in Belgium, Sagrado is of Angolan descent. He is a youth international for Belgium, havin played up to the Belgium U19s.
