= Maxence Prévot =

French footballer (born 1997)

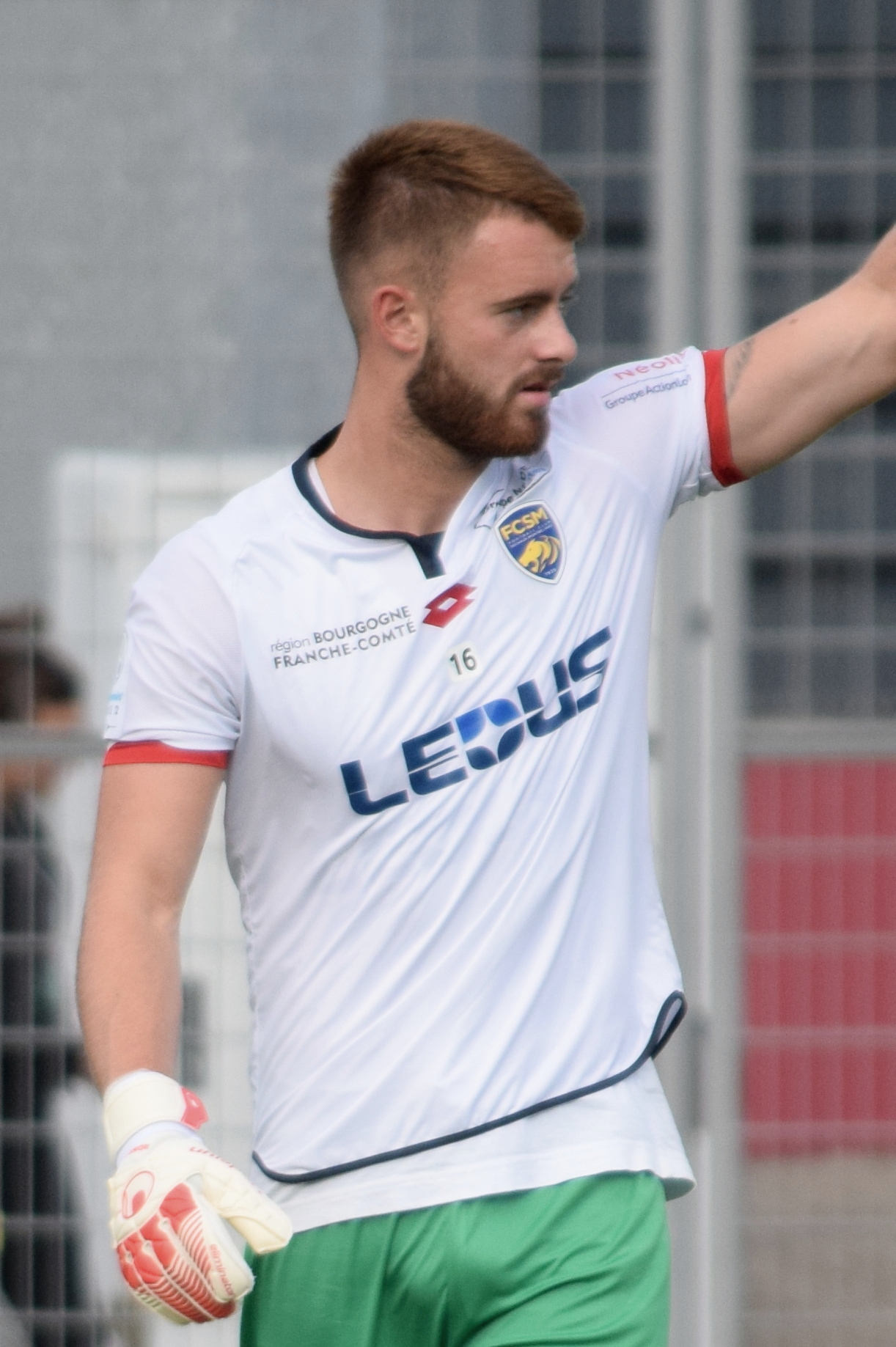

Personal information
- Date of birth: 9 April 1997 (age 29)
- Place of birth: Belfort, France
- Height: 1.87 m (6 ft 2 in)
- Position: Goalkeeper

Team information
- Current team: Dunkerque
- Number: 16

Youth career
- 2003–2004: AS Essert
- 2004–2014: Sochaux

Senior career*
Years	Team	Apps	(Gls)
2014–2017	Sochaux B	17	(0)
2016–2023	Sochaux	212	(0)
2023–2026	OH Leuven	25	(0)
2026–	Dunkerque	0	(0)

International career
2013	France U16	1	(0)
2016	France U20	1	(0)
2017	France U21	1	(0)
- * Club domestic league appearances and goals as of 25 May 2026

Maxence Prévot (born 9 April 1997) is a French professional footballer who plays as a goalkeeper for Dunkerque in the Ligue 2.
