= Joël Schingtienne =

Belgian footballer

Personal information
- Full name: Joël Marcel Schingtienne
- Date of birth: 14 August 2002 (age 24)
- Height: 1.88 m (6 ft 2 in)
- Position: Centre-back

Team information
- Current team: Venezia
- Number: 3

Youth career
- –2018: Anderlecht
- 2018–2022: OH Leuven

Senior career*
Years	Team	Apps	(Gls)
2022–2024	OH Leuven U23	22	(1)
2023–2024	OH Leuven	40	(1)
2024–	Venezia	51	(1)

International career
2024	Belgium U21	1	(0)
- * Club domestic league appearances and goals as of 12 May 2026

Joël Marcel Schingtienne (born 14 August 2002) is a Belgian professional footballer who plays as a centre-back for Serie A club Venezia.

== Club career ==
Schingtienne made his debut for OH Leuven on 15 April 2023 when he was subbed on in added time for Mathieu Maertens in an away match against Oostende.

On 28 August 2024, Schingtienne signed a five-year contract with Venezia in Italy.

== Personal life ==
Born in Belgium, Schingtienne is of DR Congolese descent.
