= Raz Shlomo =

Israeli footballer (born 1999)

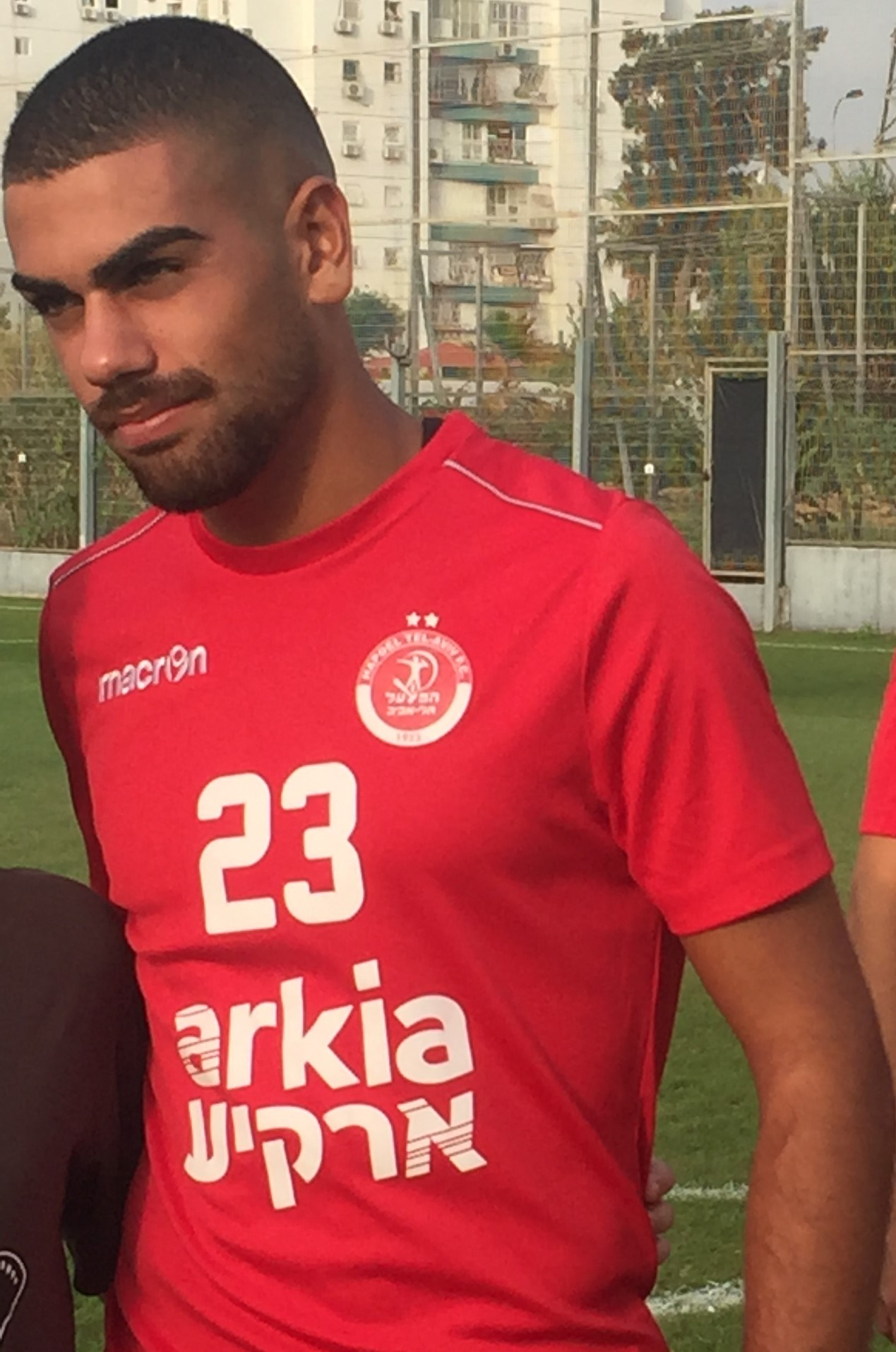
- Shlomo with Hapoel Tel Aviv in 2018

Personal information
- Date of birth: 13 August 1999 (age 27)
- Place of birth: Ashkelon, Israel
- Height: 1.88 m (6 ft 2 in)
- Position: Centre-back

Team information
- Current team: Maccabi Tel Aviv
- Number: 13

Youth career
- 2007–2012: Hapoel Ashkelon
- 2012–2018: Hapoel Tel Aviv

Senior career*
Years	Team	Apps	(Gls)
2017–2022	Hapoel Tel Aviv	92	(5)
2021–2022	→ Maccabi Netanya (loan)	31	(0)
2022–2023	Maccabi Netanya	30	(0)
2023–2024	OH Leuven	8	(1)
2024–	Maccabi Tel Aviv	59	(2)

International career^{‡}
2015	Israel U16	4	(1)
2015–2016	Israel U17	15	(1)
2016–2017	Israel U18	7	(1)
2017	Israel U19	8	(1)
2019–2021	Israel U21	7	(0)
2022–	Israel	25	(2)
- * Club domestic league appearances and goals as of 23 June 2026 ‡ National team caps and goals as of 15:52, 14 November 2026 (UTC)

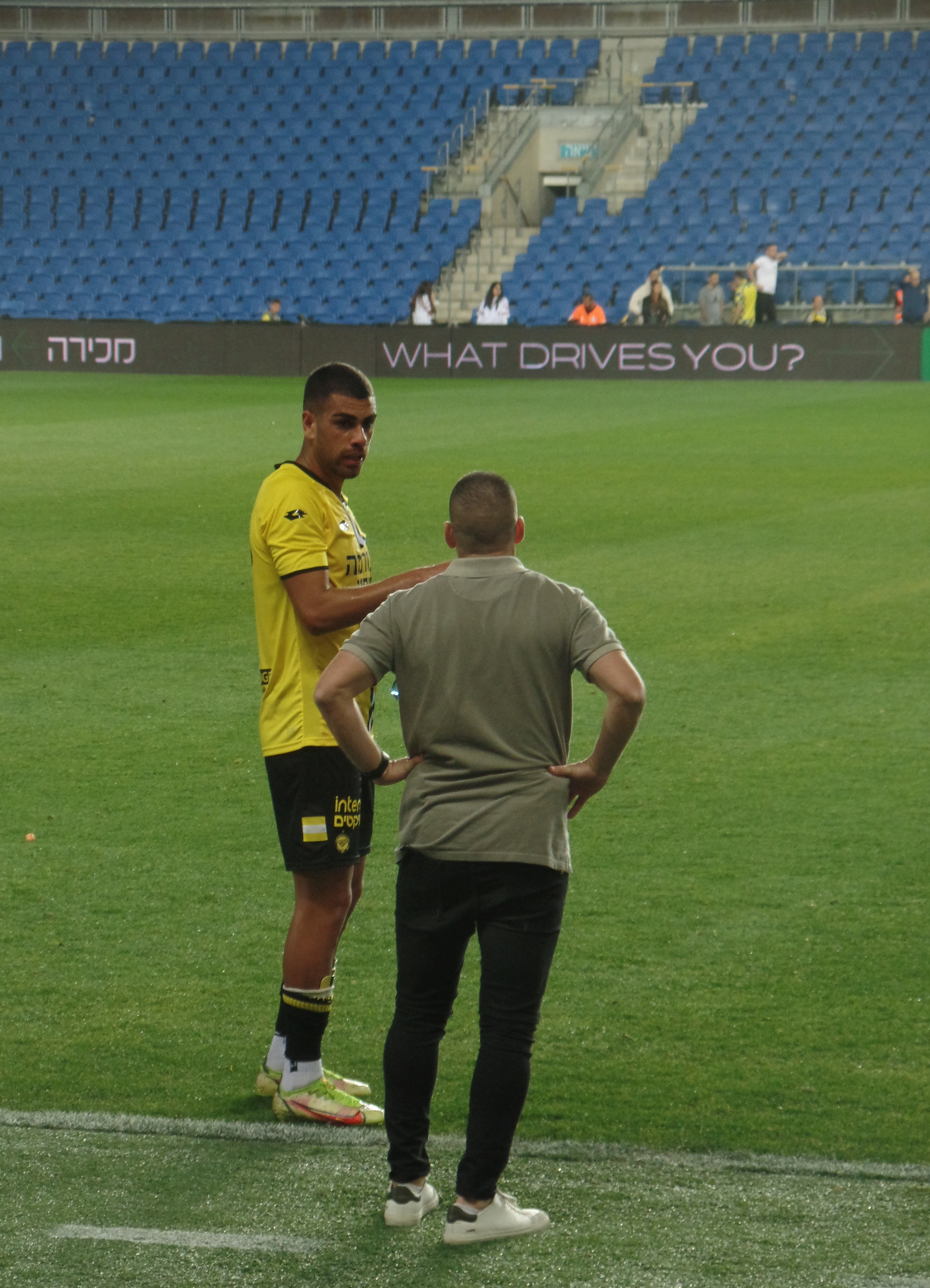
Shlomo (left) with Maccabi Netanya in 2022

Raz Shlomo (Hebrew: רז שלמה; born 13 August 1999) is an Israeli professional footballer who plays as a centre-back for Israeli Premier League club Maccabi Tel Aviv and the Israel national team.

== Early life ==
Shlomo was born and raised in Ashkelon, Israel, to an Israeli family of Jewish descent.

== International goals ==
No.	Date	Venue	Opponent	Score	Result	Competition
1.	11 June 2024	Szusza Ferenc Stadion, Budapest, Hungary	Belarus	3–0	4–0	Friendly

== Honours ==
Maccabi Netanya

- Israel Toto Cup (Ligat Ha'Al): 2022–23
