= Desmond Acquah =

Belgian footballer

Personal information
- Full name: Desmond Acquah Ofori
- Date of birth: 23 July 2002 (age 24)
- Height: 1.73 m (5 ft 8 in)
- Position: Attacking midfielder

Team information
- Current team: Dender EH
- Number: 23

Youth career
- 2013–2015: Vilvoorde-Koningslo
- 2015–2016: Diegem Sport
- 2016–2022: OH Leuven

Senior career*
Years	Team	Apps	(Gls)
2022–2024	OH Leuven U23	46	(5)
2023–2024	OH Leuven	0	(0)
2024	→ Dender EH (loan)	6	(1)
2024–2026	Dender EH	30	(1)
2026–	Kapaz	0	(0)
- * Club domestic league appearances and goals as of 11 May 2026

Desmond Acquah Ofori (born 23 July 2002) is a Belgian professional footballer who plays as an attacking midfielder for Kapaz in the Azerbaijan Premier League.

== Career ==
After already having played 40 matches for OH Leuven U23 at the highest non-professional level (Belgian National Division 1), on 1 November 2023 Acquah made his professional debut for OH Leuven as he was subbed in to replace Mathieu Maertens, with about ten minutes to play in the 5–0 Belgian Cup seventh round win over Elene Grotenberge.
