= Nachon Nsingi =

Belgian footballer

Personal information
- Full name: Nachon Nsingi Nguidi
- Date of birth: 24 April 2001 (age 25)
- Place of birth: Brussels, Belgium
- Height: 1.76 m (5 ft 9 1/2 in)
- Positions: Forward; winger

Team information
- Current team: Rodez
- Number: 9

Youth career
- 2008–2018: Crossing Schaerbeek
- 2018–2022: OH Leuven

Senior career*
Years	Team	Apps	(Gls)
2022–2025	OH Leuven	67	(8)
2024	→ Dunkerque (loan)	4	(0)
2025	→ Marítimo (loan)	4	(0)
2026	RAAL La Louvière	10	(1)
2026–	Rodez	5	(0)
- * Club domestic league appearances and goals as of 9 October 2026

Nachon Nsingi Nguidi (born 24 April 2001) is a Belgian professional footballer who plays as a forward or a winger for French Ligue 2 club Rodez. He immortalized himself with OH Leuven fans when in the dying seconds of the final game of the regular season 2023–2024, he scored the goal that kept the club in the first division following a mediocre regular season.

== Career ==
On 19 May 2018, Nsingi moved to OH Leuven from the youth academy of Crossing Schaerbeek. He made his debut for OH Leuven on 23 July 2022 in the opening match of the team's 2022–23 season away to Kortrijk, after having been awarded his first professional contract just a few days prior.

== Personal life ==
Born in Belgium, Nsingi is of DR Congolese descent.
