= Florian Miguel =

French footballer (born 1996)

Personal information
- Date of birth: 1 September 1996 (age 30)
- Place of birth: Bruges, France
- Height: 1.79 m (5 ft 10 in)
- Position: Left-back

Team information
- Current team: Metz

Youth career
- –2015: Tours

Senior career*
| Years | Team | Apps | (Gls) |
| 2014–2016 | Tours B | 20 | (2) |
| 2015–2018 | Tours | 93 | (8) |
| 2018–2021 | Nîmes | 58 | (1) |
| 2021–2023 | Huesca | 78 | (3) |
| 2023–2024 | OH Leuven | 26 | (1) |
| 2024–2026 | Burgos | 79 | (2) |
| 2026– | Metz | 0 | (0) |

International career
| 2012 | France U17 | 1 | (0) |
- * Club domestic league appearances and goals as of 6 June 2026

Florian Miguel (born 1 September 1996) is a French professional footballer who plays as a left-back for Ligue 2 club Metz.

== Club career ==
After making his professional debut with Tours FC, Miguel played for Nîmes Olympique before joining Spanish side SD Huesca on a two-year contract on 6 August 2021. On 25 July 2023, he joined Belgian club Oud-Heverlee Leuven.

On 17 July 2024, Miguel returned to Spain after signing a two-year deal with Burgos CF.

== Personal life ==
Miguel was born in France to a French mother and Portuguese father. He is a France youth international.
