= Ngonda Muzinga =

Congolese footballer

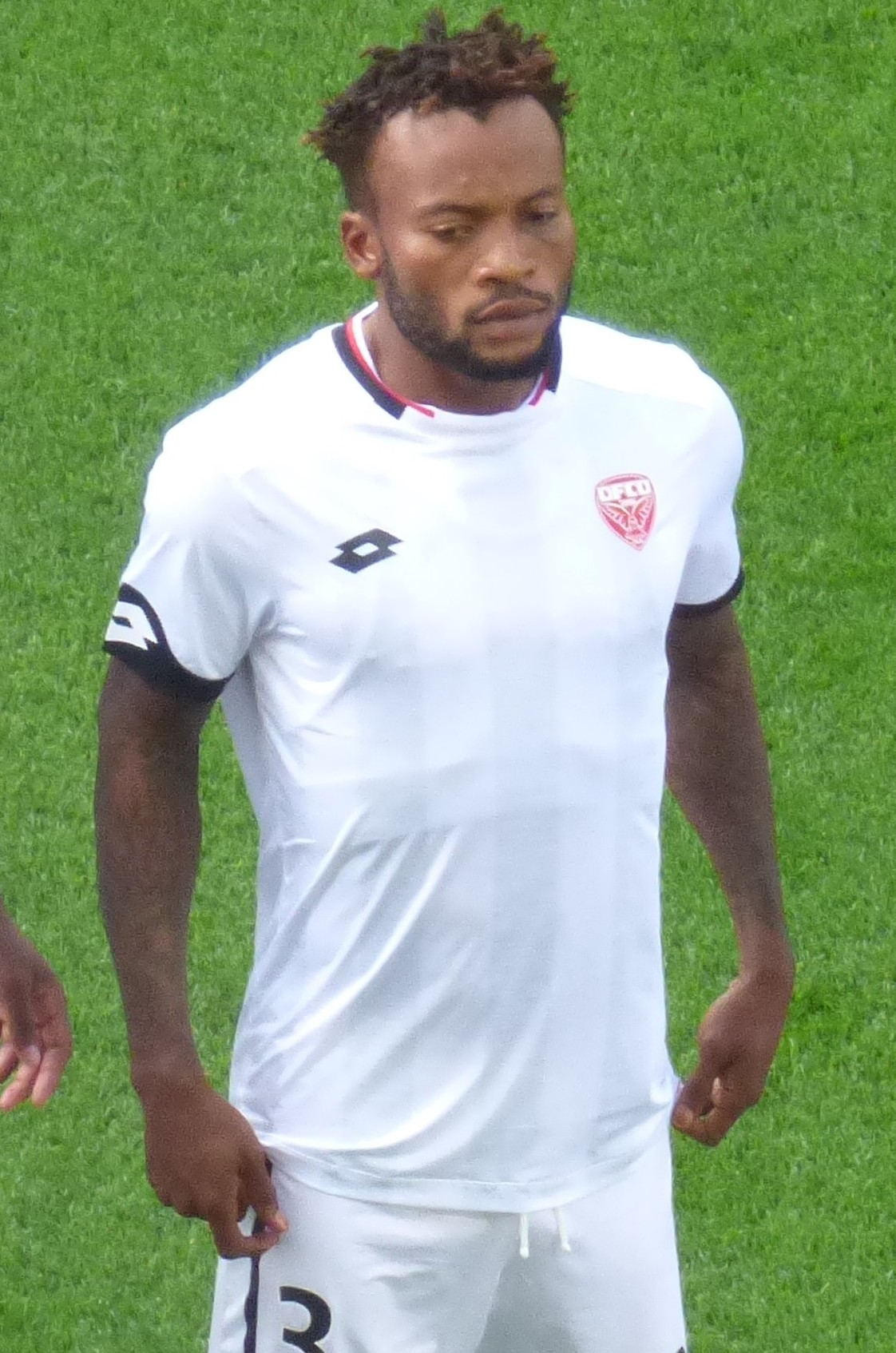
- Muzinga playing for Dijon in 2020

Personal information
- Full name: Glodi Ngonda Muzinga
- Date of birth: 31 December 1994 (age 31)
- Place of birth: Kinshasa, Zaire
- Height: 1.82 m (6 ft 0 in)
- Position: Right-back

Team information
- Current team: Riga
- Number: 25

Senior career*
Years	Team	Apps	(Gls)
2015–2019	AS Vita	55	(5)
2019–2021	Dijon	36	(2)
2019–2021	Dijon B	2	(0)
2021–	Riga	85	(4)

International career^{‡}
2017–	DR Congo	24	(0)
- * Club domestic league appearances and goals as of 16 November 2025 ‡ National team caps and goals as of 1 November 2024

Glodi Ngonda Muzinga (born 31 December 1994) is a Congolese professional footballer who plays as a right-back for Vīrsliga club Riga and the DR Congo national team.

== Club career ==
Muzinga began his professional career in 2015 with AS Vita Club in the Democratic Republic of the Congo. He contributed to the club's league title win in 2018 and remained with the team until 2019.

On 16 August 2019, he signed a two-year contract with Dijon, with an option to extend the deal by a further year. The transfer fee was reportedly around €300,000. Over two seasons, he made 36 appearances and scored two goals in Ligue 1.

In July 2021, he moved to Riga in Latvia, signing a two-year contract. The transfer was completed through an arrangement in which Riga took over the final year of his contract with Dijon. In December 2022, he extended his contract with the club until 2025. During his time at Riga, he made a total of 85 appearances, scoring four goals and providing 14 assists. He won the Latvian Cup in 2023 and the Latvian league title in 2025.

His contract with Riga expired at the end of the 2025 season, and the club decided not to renew it.

== International career ==
Muzinga made his debut for the DR Congo national team on 11 August 2017 in a 2018 African Nations Championship qualification match against the Republic of the Congo. He started the match, which ended in a 0–0 draw. In September of the same year, he appeared in both matches against Tunisia in the 2018 FIFA World Cup African qualifiers. He subsequently also featured in matches against Libya and Guinea.

He participated in the 2019 Africa Cup of Nations, appearing in the group-stage matches against Egypt and Zimbabwe, as well as the round of 16 match against Madagascar. DR Congo were eliminated after drawing 2–2 with Madagascar and losing in the penalty shoot-out.

In November 2020, Muzinga featured in both 2021 Africa Cup of Nations qualification matches against Angola. He subsequently appeared in the 2022 FIFA World Cup African qualifiers against Tanzania, Benin and Madagascar. In June 2022, he also played in the 2023 Africa Cup of Nations qualification matches against Gabon and Sudan.
