= 2025–26 KRC Genk season =

KRC Genk
2025-26 season
- Chairman: Peter Croonen
- Head Coach: Thorsten Fink
- Stadium: Cegeka Arena
- Belgian Pro League: 7th
- Belgian Cup: Eighth round
- Europa League: Round of 16
- Average home league attendance: 16,689
Home colours	Away colours	Third colours
- All statistics correct as of 13 September 2025.

The 2025-26 season is the 38th season in the history of the K.R.C. Genk (Racing Genk) as a football club, and the 30th consecutive season in Belgian Pro League. In addition to the domestic league, the team participated in the Belgian Cup and in the UEFA Europa League.

== Players ==
=== Squad information ===
Players, appearances, goals and squad numbers last updated on 9 August 2025. Appearances and goals include all official competition matches.
Note: Flags indicate national team as has been defined under FIFA eligibility rules. Players may hold more than one non-FIFA nationality.

No.	Player	Nat.	Position(s)	Date of birth (age)	Signed in	Contract ends	Signed from	Transfer fee	Apps.	Goals
Goalkeepers
1	Hendrik Van Crombrugge	(Belgium)	GK	7 June 2007 (age 19)	2023	2027	(Belgium) Anderlecht	€1.3M	24	0
26	Tobias Lawal	(Austria)	GK	7 June 2000 (age 26)	2025	2029	(Austria) LASK	€3.2M	2	0
28	Lucca Brughmans	(Belgium)	GK	27 June 2008 (age 18)	2024	2028	(Belgium) Youth Sector	N/A	0	0
71	Brent Stevens	(Belgium)	GK	11 August 2025 (age 14 months)	2024	2026	(Netherlands) MVV Maastricht	Free	0	0
Defenders
3	Mujaid Sadick	(Spain)	CB / RB	14 March 2000 (age 26)	2021	2028	(Spain) Deportivo	€1.7M	120	3
6	Matte Smets	(Belgium)	CB / DM	4 January 2004 (age 22)	2024	2028	(Belgium) Sint-Truiden	€2.25M	46	0
18	Joris Kayembe	(Democratic Republic of the Congo)	LB / LM / LW	8 August 1994 (age 32)	2023	2026	(Belgium) Charleroi	N/A	82	4
19	Yaimar Medina	(Ecuador)	LB / LM / LW	5 November 2004 (age 21)	2025	2029	(Ecuador) Independiente	€4.85M	5	0
22	Brad Manguelle	(Belgium)	CB	27 November 2007 (age 18)	2024	2027	(Belgium) Youth Sector	N/A	0	0
27	Ken Nkuba	(Belgium)	RB / RM / RW	21 January 2002 (age 24)	2024	2028	(Belgium) Charleroi	€3.75M	32	0
34	Adrián Palacios	(Venezuela)	CB / LB	7 June 2004 (age 22)	2024	2028	(Colombia) Deportivo Cali	€1.7M	3	0
44	Josue Kongolo	(Belgium)	CB	13 April 2006 (age 20)	2023	2028	(Belgium) Youth Sector	N/A	9	0
77	Zakaria El Ouahdi	(Morocco)	RB / LB / RM	31 December 2001 (age 24)	2023	2028	(Belgium) RWDM Brussels	€2.5M	70	9
Midfielders
8	Bryan Heynen (c)	(Belgium)	CM / DM	6 February 1997 (age 29)	2015	2029	(Belgium) Youth Sector	N/A	337	35
17	Patrik Hrosovsky	(Slovakia)	CM / DM	22 April 1992 (age 34)	2019	2026	(Czech Republic) Viktoria Plzen	€5.2M	235	18
20	Konstantinos Karetsas	(Greece)	AM	19 November 2007 (age 18)	2024	2027	(Belgium) Youth Sector	N/A	46	3
21	Ibrahima Sory Bangoura	(Guinea)	DM	5 January 2004 (age 22)	2024	2028	(Belgium) Youth Sector	N/A	41	0
24	Nikolas Sattlberger	(Austria)	DM / CM / CB	18 January 2004 (age 22)	2024	2029	(Austria) Rapid Wien	€2.5M	33	1
38	Daan Heymans	(Belgium)	AM / CM / RW	15 June 1999 (age 27)	2025	2029	(Belgium) Charleroi	€3M	2	0
-	Aziz Ouattara	(Ivory Coast)	DM / CB / RB	4 January 2001 (age 25)	2022	2026	(Sweden) Hammarby	€2M	48	3
Forwards
7	Jarne Steuckers	(Belgium)	RW / LW / AM	4 February 2002 (age 24)	2024	2028	(Belgium) Sint-Truiden	€800K	45	9
9	Oh Hyeon-gyu	(South Korea)	ST / RW / LW	12 April 2001 (age 25)	2024	2028	(Scotland) Celtic	€2.7M	44	13
10	Junya Ito	(Japan)	RW / ST / RM	9 March 1993 (age 33)	2025	2028	(France) Reims	€2.8M	144	29
11	Luca Oyen	(Belgium)	LW / AM	14 March 2003 (age 23)	2020	2027	(Belgium) Youth Sector	N/A	83	3
14	Yira Sor	(Niger)	LW / RW	24 July 2000 (age 26)	2023	2027	(Czech Republic) Slavia Praha	€6.5M	79	1
23	Aaron Bibout	(Cameroon)	ST	9 September 2004 (age 22)	2025	2029	(Sweden) Västerås	€2.2M	0	0
29	Robin Mirisola	(Belgium)	ST / RW	8 December 2006 (age 19)	2023	2027	(Belgium) Youth Sector	N/A	0	0
30	Ayumu Yokoyama	(Japan)	LW / ST	4 March 2003 (age 23)	2025	2029	(England) Birmingham	€3M	9	1
32	Noah Adedeji-Sternberg	(Belgium)	LW / RW / AM	19 June 2005 (age 21)	2024	2026	(Belgium) Youth Sector	N/A	46	5
99	Tolu Arokodare	(Nigeria)	ST	23 November 2000 (age 25)	2023	2027	(France) Amiens	€5M	111	41

== Transfers ==
=== Summer 2025 ===
==== In ====
Date	Pos.	Player	Age	Moving from	Fee	Notes	Source
1 July 2025	AM	(Belgium) Daan Heymans	26	(Belgium) Charleroi	€3M		
1 July 2025	LW	(Japan) Ayumu Yokoyama	22	(England) Birmingham	€3M	Redeem after loan	
9 July 2025	GK	(Austria) Tobias Lawal	25	(Austria) LASK	€3.2M		
24 July 2025	ST	(Cameroon) Aaron Bibout	20	(Sweden) Västerås	€2.2M		
9 August 2025	RW	(Japan) Junya Ito	32	(France) Stade Reims	€2.8M		

==== Out ====
Date	Pos.	Player	Age	Moving to	Fee	Notes	Source
1 June 2025	GK	(Belgium) Mike Penders	19	(England) Chelsea	—N/a	End of loan	
1 July 2025	CM	(Belgium) Thomas Claes	21	(Belgium) Zulte Waregem	€300K		
7 July 2025	LW	(Ghana) Christopher Bonsu Baah	20	(Saudi Arabia) Al-Qadsiah	€17M		
8 September 2025	ST	(Switzerland) Andi Zeqiri	26	(Poland) Widzew Łódź		Transfer	

== Pre-season and friendlies ==
28 June 2025 Friendly	Eendracht Termien (Belgium)	0-4	(Belgium) Genk	Genk, Belgium
13:00 CEST (UTC+2)		Report	Jarne Steuckers 37'; Ayumu Yokoyama 60'; Robin Mirisola 63'; Luca Oyen 75'	Stadium: Terrain ‘t Heke

4 July 2025 Friendly	Fortuna (Netherlands)	0-1	(Belgium) Genk	Nederweert-Eind, Netherlands
19:00 CEST (UTC+2)		Report	Noah Adedeji-Sternberg 31'

19 July 2025 Friendly	Genk (Belgium)	1-1	(Spain) Rayo Vallecano	Genk, Belgium
18:30 CEST (UTC+2)	Noah Adedeji-Sternberg 90+4'	Report	Álvaro García 81'	Stadium: Cegeka Arena

28 July 2025 Friendly	Genk (Belgium)	6-0	(Belgium) Eupen	Dolhain, Belgium
11:00 CEST (UTC+2)	Daan Heymans 8', 50'; Yira Collins Sor 9'; Tolu Arokodare 25'; Ken Nkuba 55'; Robin Mirisola 85'	Report		Stadium: Stade Lambert Fourir

== Competitions ==
=== Overview ===
Competition	First match	Last match	Starting round	Final position	Record							
Competition	First match	Last match	Starting round	Final position	Pld	W	D	L	GF	GA	GD	Win %
Belgian Pro League	27 July 2025	22 March 2026	Matchday 1	7th	30	11	9	10	46	47	−1	36.67
Belgian Pro League Europe play-offs	3 April 2026	TBD	7th	TBD	2	1	1	0	2	1	+1	50.00
Belgian Cup	29 October 2025	4 December 2025	Seventh round	Eighth round	2	1	0	1	4	3	+1	50.00
UEFA Europa League	21 August 2025	19 March 2026	Play-off round	Round of 16	12	7	2	3	19	16	+3	58.33
Total					46	20	12	14	71	67	+4	43.48

Last updated: 12 April 2026
Source: Competitions

=== Belgian Pro League ===
==== League table ====
Pos	Team	Pld	W	D	L	GF	GA	GD	Pts	Qualification or relegation
5	Mechelen	30	12	9	9	39	37	+2	45	Qualification for the Champions' play-offs
6	Anderlecht	30	12	8	10	43	39	+4	44	Qualification for the Champions' play-offs
7	Genk	30	11	9	10	46	47	−1	42	Qualification for the Europe play-offs
8	Standard Liège	30	11	7	12	27	35	−8	40	Qualification for the Europe play-offs
9	Westerlo	30	10	9	11	36	40	−4	39	Qualification for the Europe play-offs

Source: Jupiler Pro League (in Dutch)
Rules for classification: 1) Points; 2) Matches won; 3) Goal difference; 4) Goals scored; 5) Away matches won; 6) Away goal difference; 7) Away goals scored; 8) Play-off.

==== Results summary ====
Overall								Home						Away					
Pld	W	D	L	GF	GA	GD	Pts	W	D	L	GF	GA	GD	W	D	L	GF	GA	GD
30	11	9	10	46	47	−1	42	6	4	5	21	20	+1	5	5	5	25	27	−2

Last updated: 22 March 2026.
Source: Jupiler Pro League

==== Results by round ====
Round	1	2	3	4	5	6	7	8	9	10	11	12	13	14	15	16	17	18	19	20	21	22	23	24	25	26	27	28	29	30
Ground	A	H	A	A	H	H	A	H	A	H	A	H	A	A	H	H	A	H	A	H	A	H	A	H	A	H	H	A	H	A
Result	L	D	L	W	L	W	D	L	W	W	D	D	W	D	L	W	L	D	D	L	L	D	W	W	W	L	W	L	W	D
Position	13	12	14	8	10	9	10	14	9	7	8	8	7	7	8	6	8	7	7	9	11	11	10	8	7	7	6	8	7	7

Source: KRC Genk
A = Away; H = Home; W = Win; D = Draw; L = Loss

==== Matches ====
27 July 2025 1	Club Brugge	2–1	Genk	Bruges, Belgium
18:30 CEST (UTC+2)	Ordóñez 62'; Mechele 81'	Report	Hyun-gyu 9'	Stadium: Jan Breydelstadion; Attendance: 24,073; Referee: Jasper Vergoote

3 August 2025 2	Genk	1–1	Antwerp	Genk, Belgium
13:30 CEST (UTC+2)	El Ouahdi 28'	Report	Janssen 24'	Stadium: Cegeka Arena; Attendance: 18,030; Referee: Lawrence Fisher

10 August 2025 3	Standard Liège	2–1	Genk	Liege, Belgium
18:30 CEST (UTC+2)	Henry 37' (pen.); Fossey 54'	Report	Arokodare 70'	Stadium: Stade Maurice Dufrasne; Attendance: 21,575; Referee: Nathan Verboomen

15 August 2025 4	OH Leuven	1–2	Genk	Leuven, Belgium
20:45 CEST (UTC+2)	Nyakossi 37'	Report	El Ouahdi 13', 19'	Stadium: Den Dreef; Attendance: 8,814; Referee: Lothar D'Hondt

31 August 2025 6	Genk	3–2	Zulte Waregem	Genk, Belgium
19:15 CEST (UTC+2)	Mujaid 13' (red card) 33'; Mirisola (yellow card) 14' (goal) 29'; El Ouahdi 56'; Kayembe (yellow card) 90+2'	Report	Erenbjerg 2'; Tanghe 35' (pen.); Lofolomo (yellow card) 47'; Nnadi (yellow card) 74'	Stadium: Cegeka Arena; Attendance: 17,060; Referee: Bram Van Driessche

14 September 2025 7	Anderlecht	1–1	Genk	Anderlecht, Belgium
18:30 CEST (UTC+2)	Huerta (yellow card) 15'; Degreef (red card) 30'; Vázquez 57'; Hazard (yellow card) 90+8'	Report	Karetsas (yellow card) 42'; Erabi 79'; Medina (yellow card) 85'; Erabi (yellow card) 90+1'	Stadium: Lotto Park; Attendance: 20,500; Referee: Lothar D'hondt

17 September 2025 5	Genk	0–1	Charleroi	Genk, Belgium
20:30 CEST (UTC+2)		Report	Scheidler 16'; Camara (yellow card) 45+1'; Blum (yellow card) 53'	Stadium: Cegeka Arena; Attendance: 13,230; Referee: Simon Bourdeaud'Hui

21 September 2025 8	Genk	1–2	Union SG	Genk, Belgium
19:30 CEST (UTC+2)	El Ouahdi (yellow card) 26'; Itō 55'; Kayembe (yellow card) 90'	Report	David 9'; Leysen (yellow card) 43'; Niang (yellow card) 45'; Mac Allister (yellow card) 58'; Van de Perre (yellow card) 89'; Schoofs 90+3'; Pocognoli (yellow card) 90+3'	Stadium: Cegeka Arena; Attendance: 17,980; Referee: Nathan Verboomen

28 September 2025 9	Sint-Truiden	1–2	Genk	Sint-Truiden, Belgium
19:30 CEST (UTC+2)	Heynen 3' (o.g.); Sissako (yellow card) 34'; Van Helden (red card) 53'; Musliu (yellow card) 59'; Vanwesemael (yellow card) 64'; Kokubo (yellow card) 90+4'	Report	Itō 56'; Heynen (yellow card) 70'; Karetsas (yellow card) 90'; Oh 90+4'	Stadium: Daio Wasabi Stayen Stadium; Attendance: 10,250; Referee: Lawrence Visser

5 October 2025 10	Genk	2–1	Dender EH	Genk, Belgium
17:00 CEST (UTC+2)	Heynen 45'; Smets (yellow card) 67'; Nkuba 83'; Sattlberger (yellow card) 90+5'	Report	Nsimba 10'; Fredrick (yellow card) 13'; Viltard (yellow card) 45+2' (yellow-red card) 55'; De Fougerolles (yellow card) 61'; Toshevski (red card) 90+2'	Stadium: Cegeka Arena; Attendance: 15,352; Referee: Massimiliano Ledda

==== Champions' play-offs ====
===== League table =====
Pos	Team	Pld	W	D	L	GF	GA	GD	Pts	Qualification or relegation	GNK	STA	CHA	WES	ANT	OHL
1	Genk	10	4	5	1	11	6	+5	38	Qualification for the European competition play-off	—	1–1	1–1	3–0	0–0	0–0
2	Standard Liège	10	5	2	3	17	11	+6	37		0–0	—	0–2	1–2	1–2	2–1
3	Charleroi	10	5	2	3	12	8	+4	34		2–0	1–2	—	0–1	2–1	1–1
4	Westerlo	10	4	1	5	14	17	−3	33		1–2	1–2	2–0	—	2–4	3–3

Source: Jupiler Pro League (in Dutch), Soccerway
Legend: Blue = home team win; Yellow = draw; Red = away team win.
Rules for classification: 1) Points; 2) Points without (possible) half points added due to rounding; 3) Regular season finishing position.

===== Results summary =====
Overall								Home						Away					
Pld	W	D	L	GF	GA	GD	Pts	W	D	L	GF	GA	GD	W	D	L	GF	GA	GD
2	0	2	0	2	1	+1	2	0	1	0	0	0	0	0	1	0	2	1	+1

Last updated: 12 April 2026.
Source: Competitions

===== Results by round =====
Round	1	2	3	4	5	6	7	8	9	10
Ground	A	H	A	H	H	A	H	A	H	A
Result	W	D								
Position	2	1								

Updated to match(es) played on 12 April 2026. Source:
A = Away; H = Home; W = Win; D = Draw; L = Loss

==== Matches ====
3 April 2026 1	Antwerp	1–2	Genk	Antwerp, Belgium
20:45 CEST (UTC+2)	Scott 86'		Heymans 45+2', 51' (pen.)	Stadium: Bosuilstadion; Attendance: 12,606; Referee: Lothar D'hondt

12 April 2026 2	Genk	0–0	OH Leuven	Genk, Belgium
16:00 CEST (UTC+2)				Stadium: Cegeka Arena; Attendance: 11,605; Referee: Wim Smet

18 April 2026 3	Westerlo	v	Genk	Westerlo, Belgium
18:15 CEST (UTC+2)				Stadium: Het Kuipje

21 April 2026 4	Genk	v	Charleroi	Genk, Belgium
20:30 CEST (UTC+2)				Stadium: Cegeka Arena

25 April 2026 5	Genk	v	Standard Liège	Genk, Belgium
18:15 CEST (UTC+2)				Stadium: Cegeka Arena

2 May 2026 6	Charleroi	v	Genk	Charleroi, Belgium
18:15 CEST (UTC+2)				Stadium: Stade du Pays de Charleroi

10 May 2026 7	Genk	v	Westerlo	Genk, Belgium
19:15 CEST (UTC+2)				Stadium: Cegeka Arena

16 May 2026 8	Standard Liège	v	Genk	Liège, Belgium
18:15 CEST (UTC+2)				Stadium: Stade Maurice Dufrasne

19 May 2026 9	Genk	v	Antwerp	Genk, Belgium
20:30 CEST (UTC+2)				Stadium: Cegeka Arena

23 May 2026 10	OH Leuven	v	Genk	Leuven, Belgium
20:45 CEST (UTC+2)				Stadium: Den Dreef

=== Belgian Cup ===
29 October 2025 Seventh round	Genk	3–0	RWDM Brussels	Genk, Belgium
20:30 CET	Heymans 65', 77'; Heynen 70'	Report		Stadium: Cegeka Arena; Attendance: 6,850; Referee: Klass Clerkx

4 December 2025 Eighth round	Genk	1–3 (a.e.t.)	Anderlecht	Genk, Belgium
20:30 CET	Karetsas 24'	Report	Bertaccini 82'; Hazard 107' (pen.); Kanaté 120+6'	Stadium: Cegeka Arena; Attendance: 14,100; Referee: Nicolas Laforge

=== UEFA Europa League ===
==== Play-off round ====
21 August 2025 First leg	Lech Poznań (Poland)	1–5	(Belgium) Genk	Poznań Stadium, Poznań
20:30	Jagiełło 19'	Report	Hrošovský 10', 25'; Heynen 33'; Oh Hyeon-gyu 40'; Gurgul 48' (o.g.)	Attendance: 25,443; Referee: Donatas Rumšas (Lithuania)

28 August 2025 Second leg	Genk (Belgium)	1–2 (6–3 agg.)	(Poland) Lech Poznań	Cegeka Arena, Genk
20:00	Itō 31'	Report	Lisman 43'; Bengtsson 56'	Attendance: 12,913; Referee: Davide Massa (Italy)

==== League phase ====
Pos	Team	Pld	W	D	L	GF	GA	GD	Pts	Qualification
7	(German Football Association) SC Freiburg	8	5	2	1	10	4	+6	17	Advance to round of 16 (seeded)
8	(Italian Football Federation) Roma	8	5	1	2	13	6	+7	16	Advance to round of 16 (seeded)
9	(Royal Belgian Football Association) Genk	8	5	1	2	11	7	+4	16	Advance to knockout phase play-offs (seeded)
10	(Italian Football Federation) Bologna	8	4	3	1	14	7	+7	15	Advance to knockout phase play-offs (seeded)
11	(German Football Association) VfB Stuttgart	8	5	0	3	15	9	+6	15	Advance to knockout phase play-offs (seeded)

Source: UEFA
Rules for classification: League phase tiebreakers

Round	1	2	3	4	5	6	7	8
Ground	A	H	H	A	H	A	A	H
Result	W	L	D	W	W	L	W	W
Position	9	18	19	13	9	16	10	9
Points	3	3	4	7	10	10	13	16

Source: UEFA
A = Away; H = Home; W = Win; D = Draw; L = Loss

Win Draw Loss Fixtures

25 September 2025 1	Rangers (Scotland)	0–1	(Belgium) Genk	Ibrox Stadium, Glasgow
21:00 (20:00 UTC+1)		Report	Oh 55'	Attendance: 37,898; Referee: Matej Jug (Slovenia)

2 October 2025 2	Genk (Belgium)	0–1	(Hungary) Ferencváros	Cegeka Arena, Genk
21:00		Report	B. Varga 44' (yellow card) 82'; Cissé (yellow card) 67'; Gartenmann (yellow card) 74'	Attendance: 13,743; Referee: Anastasios Sidiropoulos (Greece)

23 October 2025 3	Genk (Belgium)	0–0	(Spain) Real Betis	Cegeka Arena, Genk
18:45		Report		Attendance: 16,780; Referee: Elchin Masiyev (Azerbaijan)

6 November 2025 4	Braga (Portugal)	3–4	(Belgium) Genk	Estádio Municipal, Braga
21:00 (20:00 UTC+0)	Zalazar 30', 71'; Navarro 86'	Report	Heymans 45+2'; Sor 48'; Oh Hyeon-gyu 59'; Medina 72'	Attendance: 11,265; Referee: Balázs Berke (Hungary)

27 November 2025 5	Genk (Belgium)	2–1	(Switzerland) Basel	Cegeka Arena, Genk
21:00	Oh Hyeon-gyu 14'; Karetsas 45+2'	Report	Otele 57'	Attendance: 13,104; Referee: Orel Grinfeld (Israel)

11 December 2025 6	Midtjylland (Denmark)	1–0	(Belgium) Genk	MCH Arena, Herning
18:45	Cho Gue-sung 17'	Report		Attendance: 9,820; Referee: Vasilios Fotias (Greece)

22 January 2026 7	Utrecht (Netherlands)	0–2	(Belgium) Genk	Stadion Galgenwaard, Utrecht
21:50		Report	El Ouahdi 54'; Heymans 83' (pen.)	Attendance: 21,416; Referee: Rob Hennessy (Republic of Ireland)

29 January 2026 8	Genk (Belgium)	2–1	(Sweden) Malmö FF	Cegeka Arena, Genk
21:00	Heymans 45' (pen.); Karetsas 82'	Report	Ali 4'	Attendance: 11,450; Referee: Horațiu Feșnic (Romania)

==== Knockout phase ====
===== Play-off =====
19 February 2026 First leg	Dinamo Zagreb (Croatia)	1–3	(Belgium) Genk	Stadion Maksimir, Zagreb
18:45	Beljo 44'	Report	Heynen 15'; El Ouahdi 21', 90'	Attendance: 10,554; Referee: Halil Umut Meler (Turkey)

26 February 2026 Second leg	Genk (Belgium)	3–3 (a.e.t.)	(Croatia) Dinamo Zagreb	Cegeka Arena, Genk
21:00	Sor 51'; Pérez Vinlöf 101' (o.g.); Heymans 114'	Report	Bakrar 45+2'; Stojković 57' (pen.), 75'	Attendance: 11,225; Referee: Felix Zwayer (Germany)

===== Round of 16 =====
12 March 2026 First leg	Genk (Belgium)	1–0	(Germany) SC Freiburg	Cegeka Arena, Genk
21:00	El Ouahdi 24'	Report		Attendance: 15,550; Referee: Chris Kavanagh (England)

19 March 2026 Second leg	SC Freiburg (Germany)	5–1 (5–2 agg.)	(Belgium) Genk	Europa-Park Stadion, Freiburg im Breisgau
18:45	Ginter 19'; Matanović 25'; Grifo 53'; Suzuki 57'; Eggestein 79'	Report	Smets 39'	Attendance: 33,000; Referee: Michael Oliver (England)
