= 2025–26 UEFA Europa League knockout phase =

Europe premier club football tournament

The 2025–26 UEFA Europa League knockout phase began on 19 February with the knockout phase play-offs and ended on 20 May 2026 with the final at the Beşiktaş Stadium in Istanbul, Turkey, to decide the champions of the 2025–26 UEFA Europa League. A total of 24 teams competed in the knockout phase, with 16 entering in the play-offs and 8 receiving a bye to the round of 16.

Times are CET/CEST, (Note: CET (UTC+1) for dates up to 28 March 2026 (knockout phase play-offs and round of 16), and CEST (UTC+2) for dates thereafter (quarter-finals, semi-finals and final).) as listed by UEFA (local times, if different, are in parentheses).

== Qualified teams ==
The knockout phase involved the top 24 teams that qualified from the league phase. The top 8 teams received a bye to the round of 16, while teams finishing in positions 9 to 24 entered the knockout phase play-offs.

Entering the round of 16 (seeded)
Pos	Team
1	(France) Lyon
2	(England) Aston Villa
3	(Denmark) Midtjylland
4	(Spain) Real Betis
5	(Portugal) Porto
6	(Portugal) Braga
7	(Germany) SC Freiburg
8	(Italy) Roma

Entering the play-offs (seeded)
Pos	Team
9	(Belgium) Genk
10	(Italy) Bologna
11	(Germany) VfB Stuttgart
12	(Hungary) Ferencváros
13	(England) Nottingham Forest
14	(Czech Republic) Viktoria Plzeň
15	(Serbia) Red Star Belgrade
16	(Spain) Celta Vigo

Entering the play-offs (unseeded)
Pos	Team
17	(Greece) PAOK
18	(France) Lille
19	(Turkey) Fenerbahçe
20	(Greece) Panathinaikos
21	(Scotland) Celtic
22	(Bulgaria) Ludogorets Razgrad
23	(Croatia) Dinamo Zagreb
24	(Norway) Brann

== Format ==
Each tie in the knockout phase, apart from the final, was played over two legs, with each team playing one leg at home. The team that scored more goals on aggregate over the two legs advanced to the next round. If the aggregate score was level, then 30 minutes of extra time were played (the away goals rule was not applied). If the score was still level at the end of extra time, the winners were decided by a penalty shoot-out. In the final, which was played as a single match, if the score was level at the end of normal time, extra time was played, followed by a penalty shoot-out if the score was still level.

=== Draw procedure ===
In the knockout phase, there was no country protection, with teams from the same association able to face each other in any round. Teams could also face opponents they played during the league phase.

The mechanism of the draws for each round was as follows:

- In the draw for the knockout phase play-offs, the eight teams finishing the league phase in positions 9–16 were seeded, and the eight teams finishing the league phase in positions 17–24 were unseeded. The draw was split into four sections based on the predetermined bracket, with the seeded teams in each section drawn against one of their two possible unseeded opponents. The seeded teams hosted the second leg.
- In the draw for the round of 16, the eight teams finishing the league phase in positions 1–8 were seeded, and the eight winners of the knockout phase play-offs were unseeded. Again, the draw was split into four sections based on the predetermined bracket, with the seeded teams in each section drawn against one of their two possible unseeded opponents. The seeded teams hosted the second leg.

In the quarter-finals and semi-finals, both the exact match pairings and order of legs were predetermined based on the tournament bracket. The teams with the better league phase ranking played the second leg of each round at home if they continued advancing. Should a seeded team have been beaten, the team that eliminated them took over their seeding position. The winner of semi-final 1 was designated as the "home" team for the final (for administrative purposes, as it was played at a neutral venue).

In the knockout phase, teams from the same or nearby cities were not scheduled to play at home on the same day or on consecutive days, due to logistics and crowd control. To avoid such scheduling conflict, if the two teams were drawn to play at home for the same leg, the home match of the team that had the lower league phase ranking (if in the same competition) or the team playing in lower tier competition (Conference League) was moved from Thursday from a regularly scheduled time to an earlier time slot, to a different day, and/or at an alternative venue without clashing any other competition. However, a fixture reversal only applied if a team qualified to play the second leg at home decided to inform the UEFA administration before the draw to reverse the tie and play the first leg at home and not a second leg at an alternative venue.

=== Predetermined pairings ===
The bracket structure for the knockout phase was partially fixed in advance using seeding, with a symmetrical pattern on both sides. Teams' positions in the bracket were determined by their final standings in the league phase, ensuring that higher-ranked teams faced lower-ranked opponents in earlier rounds. As a result, certain sets of teams, such as the top two from the league phase, could not meet until the final.

The structure of each side of the bracket can be summarised as follows, with the exact pairings of the play-offs and round of 16 determined by a draw: (Note: The draws determined the exact play-off and round of 16 pairings for each side of the bracket, which mirrored each other. For example, if the team in 9th was drawn against 23rd in the play-offs, the team in 10th would be drawn against 24th on the other side of the bracket.)

- Knockout phase play-offs
  - Pairing I: 9/10 vs 23/24
  - Pairing II: 11/12 vs 21/22
  - Pairing III: 13/14 vs 19/20
  - Pairing IV: 15/16 vs 17/18
- Round of 16
  - Pairing A: 1/2 vs Winner IV
  - Pairing B: 3/4 vs Winner III
  - Pairing C: 5/6 vs Winner II
  - Pairing D: 7/8 vs Winner I
- Quarter-finals
  - Pairing 1: Winner A vs Winner D
  - Pairing 2: Winner B vs Winner C
- Semi-finals: Winner 1 vs Winner 2

== Schedule ==
The schedule was as follows (all draws were held at the UEFA headquarters in Nyon, Switzerland).

Round	Draw date	First leg	Second leg
Knockout phase play-offs	30 January 2026	19 February 2026	26 February 2026
Round of 16	27 February 2026	12 March 2026	19 March 2026
Quarter-finals	—N/a	9 April 2026	16 April 2026
Semi-finals	—N/a	30 April 2026	7 May 2026
Final	—N/a	20 May 2026 at Beşiktaş Stadium, Istanbul	

== Bracket ==
Knockout phase play-offs
22	(Bulgaria) Ludogorets Razgrad	2	0	2
12	(Hungary) Ferencváros	1	2	3
20	(Greece) Panathinaikos (p)	2	1	3 (4)
14	(Czech Republic) Viktoria Plzeň	2	1	3 (3)
23	(Croatia) Dinamo Zagreb	1	3	4
9	(Belgium) Genk (a.e.t.)	3	3	6
17	(Greece) PAOK	1	0	1
16	(Spain) Celta Vigo	2	1	3
21	(Scotland) Celtic	1	1	2
11	(Germany) VfB Stuttgart	4	0	4
19	(Turkey) Fenerbahçe	0	2	2
13	(England) Nottingham Forest	3	1	4
24	(Norway) Brann	0	0	0
10	(Italy) Bologna	1	1	2
18	(France) Lille (a.e.t.)	0	2	2
15	(Serbia) Red Star Belgrade	1	0	1

Round of 16
12	(Hungary) Ferencváros	2	0	2
6	(Portugal) Braga	0	4	4
20	(Greece) Panathinaikos	1	0	1
4	(Spain) Real Betis	0	4	4
9	(Belgium) Genk	1	1	2
7	(Germany) SC Freiburg	0	5	5
16	(Spain) Celta Vigo	1	2	3
1	(France) Lyon	1	0	1
11	(Germany) VfB Stuttgart	1	0	1
5	(Portugal) Porto	2	2	4
13	(England) Nottingham Forest (p)	0	2	2 (3)
3	(Denmark) Midtjylland	1	1	2 (0)
10	(Italy) Bologna (a.e.t.)	1	4	5
8	(Italy) Roma	1	3	4
18	(France) Lille	0	0	0
2	(England) Aston Villa	1	2	3

Quarter-finals
6	(Portugal) Braga	1	4	5
4	(Spain) Real Betis	1	2	3
7	(Germany) SC Freiburg	3	3	6
16	(Spain) Celta Vigo	0	1	1
5	(Portugal) Porto	1	0	1
13	(England) Nottingham Forest	1	1	2
10	(Italy) Bologna	1	0	1
2	(England) Aston Villa	3	4	7

Semi-finals
6	(Portugal) Braga	2	1	3
7	(Germany) SC Freiburg	1	3	4
13	(England) Nottingham Forest	1	0	1
2	(England) Aston Villa	0	4	4

Final
20 May – Istanbul
7	(Germany) SC Freiburg	0
2	(England) Aston Villa	3

== Knockout phase play-offs ==
The draw for the knockout phase play-offs was held on 30 January 2026, 13:00 CET.

=== Seeding ===
The draw was split into four seeded and four unseeded pots, based on the predetermined pairings for the knockout phase. Teams were allocated based on their final position in the league phase. Teams in positions 9 to 16 were seeded (playing the second legs at home), while teams in positions 17 to 24 were unseeded. The draw began with the unseeded teams, allocating them all to a tie. Once completed, all the seeded teams were drawn into a tie as their opponents.

9/10 vs 23/24		11/12 vs 21/22	
Seeded	Unseeded	Seeded	Unseeded
(Belgium) Genk; (Italy) Bologna	(Croatia) Dinamo Zagreb; (Norway) Brann	(Germany) VfB Stuttgart; (Hungary) Ferencváros	(Scotland) Celtic; (Bulgaria) Ludogorets Razgrad

13/14 vs 19/20		15/16 vs 17/18	
Seeded	Unseeded	Seeded	Unseeded
(England) Nottingham Forest; (Czech Republic) Viktoria Plzeň	(Turkey) Fenerbahçe; (Greece) Panathinaikos	(Serbia) Red Star Belgrade; (Spain) Celta Vigo	(Greece) PAOK; (France) Lille

=== Summary ===
The first legs were played on 19 February, and the second legs were played on 26 February 2026.

Team 1	Agg.	Team 2	1st leg	2nd leg
Ludogorets Razgrad (Bulgaria)	2–3	(Hungary) Ferencváros	2–1	0–2
Panathinaikos (Greece)	3–3 (4–3 p)	(Czech Republic) Viktoria Plzeň	2–2	1–1 (a.e.t.)
Dinamo Zagreb (Croatia)	4–6	(Belgium) Genk	1–3	3–3 (a.e.t.)
PAOK (Greece)	1–3	(Spain) Celta Vigo	1–2	0–1
Celtic (Scotland)	2–4	(Germany) VfB Stuttgart	1–4	1–0
Fenerbahçe (Turkey)	2–4	(England) Nottingham Forest	0–3	2–1
Brann (Norway)	0–2	(Italy) Bologna	0–1	0–1
Lille (France)	2–1	(Serbia) Red Star Belgrade	0–1	2–0 (a.e.t.)

=== Matches ===
19 February 2026
21:00 (22:00 UTC+2)

Ludogorets Razgrad (Bulgaria)	2–1	(Hungary) Ferencváros
Duah 24'; Son 67'	Report	Yusuf 27'

Huvepharma Arena, Razgrad
Attendance: 3,145
Referee: Tobias Stieler (Germany)
26 February 2026
18:45

Ferencváros (Hungary)	2–0	(Bulgaria) Ludogorets Razgrad
Kanichowsky 14'; Zachariassen 30'	Report

Ferencváros Stadion, Budapest
Attendance: 17,989
Referee: Chris Kavanagh (England)

Ferencváros won 3–2 on aggregate.

19 February 2026
21:00 (22:00 UTC+2)

Panathinaikos (Greece)	2–2	(Czech Republic) Viktoria Plzeň
Tetteh 31', 61'	Report	Višinský 11'; Ladra 80'

Olympic Stadium, Athens
Attendance: 20,227
Referee: Nick Walsh (Scotland)
26 February 2026
18:45

Viktoria Plzeň (Czech Republic)	1–1 (a.e.t.)	(Greece) Panathinaikos
Spáčil 62'	Report	Tetteh 9'
Penalties
Memić (penalty missed); Hrošovský (penalty scored); Višinský (penalty scored); Souaré (penalty missed); Valenta (penalty scored)	3–4	(penalty missed) Calabria; (penalty scored) Pellistri; (penalty scored) Đuričić; (penalty scored) Świderski; (penalty scored) Pantović

Doosan Arena, Plzeň
Attendance: 11,244
Referee: Donatas Rumšas (Lithuania)

3–3 on aggregate; Panathinaikos won 4–3 on penalties.

19 February 2026
18:45

Dinamo Zagreb (Croatia)	1–3	(Belgium) Genk
Beljo 44'	Report	Heynen 15'; El Ouahdi 21', 90'

Stadion Maksimir, Zagreb
Attendance: 10,554
Referee: Halil Umut Meler (Turkey)
26 February 2026
21:00

Genk (Belgium)	3–3 (a.e.t.)	(Croatia) Dinamo Zagreb
Sor 51'; Pérez Vinlöf 101' (o.g.); Heymans 114'	Report	Bakrar 45+2'; Stojković 57' (pen.), 75'

Cegeka Arena, Genk
Attendance: 11,225
Referee: Felix Zwayer (Germany)

Genk won 6–4 on aggregate.

19 February 2026
18:45 (19:45 UTC+2)

PAOK (Greece)	1–2	(Spain) Celta Vigo
Jeremejeff 77'	Report	Aspas 34'; Swedberg 43'

Toumba Stadium, Thessaloniki
Attendance: 20,448
Referee: Ivan Kružliak (Slovakia)
26 February 2026
21:00

Celta Vigo (Spain)	1–0	(Greece) PAOK
Swedberg 63'	Report

Balaídos, Vigo
Attendance: 21,344
Referee: Marco Guida (Italy)

Celta Vigo won 3–1 on aggregate.

19 February 2026
21:00 (20:00 UTC+0)

Celtic (Scotland)	1–4	(Germany) VfB Stuttgart
Nygren 21'	Report	El Khannouss 15', 28'; Leweling 57'; Tomás 90+3'

Celtic Park, Glasgow
Attendance: 52,901
Referee: Erik Lambrechts (Belgium)
26 February 2026
18:45

VfB Stuttgart (Germany)	0–1	(Scotland) Celtic
	Report	McCowan 1'

MHPArena, Stuttgart
Attendance: 58,500
Referee: Irfan Peljto (Bosnia and Herzegovina)

VfB Stuttgart won 4–2 on aggregate.

19 February 2026
18:45 (20:45 UTC+3)

Fenerbahçe (Turkey)	0–3	(England) Nottingham Forest
	Report	Murillo 21'; Igor Jesus 43'; Gibbs-White 50'

Şükrü Saracoğlu Stadium, Istanbul
Attendance: 39,840
Referee: Sandro Schärer (Switzerland)
26 February 2026
21:00 (20:00 UTC+0)

Nottingham Forest (England)	1–2	(Turkey) Fenerbahçe
Hudson-Odoi 68'	Report	Aktürkoğlu 22', 48' (pen.)

City Ground, West Bridgford
Attendance: 26,883
Referee: Maurizio Mariani (Italy)

Nottingham Forest won 4–2 on aggregate.

19 February 2026
18:45

Brann (Norway)	0–1	(Italy) Bologna
	Report	Castro 9'

Brann Stadion, Bergen
Attendance: 15,680
Referee: Rade Obrenović (Slovenia)
26 February 2026
21:00

Bologna (Italy)	1–0	(Norway) Brann
João Mário 56'	Report

Stadio Renato Dall'Ara, Bologna
Attendance: 19,710
Referee: Benoît Bastien (France)

Bologna won 2–0 on aggregate.

19 February 2026
21:00

Lille (France)	0–1	(Serbia) Red Star Belgrade
	Report	Tebo Uchenna 45+1'

Stade Pierre-Mauroy, Villeneuve-d'Ascq
Attendance: 22,087
Referee: Sven Jablonski (Germany)
26 February 2026
18:45

Red Star Belgrade (Serbia)	0–2 (a.e.t.)	(France) Lille
	Report	Giroud 4'; Ngoy 99'

Red Star Stadium, Belgrade
Attendance: 46,477
Referee: Anthony Taylor (England)

Lille won 2–1 on aggregate.

== Round of 16 ==
The draw for the round of 16 was held on 27 February 2026, 13:00 CET.

=== Seeding ===
As the bracket was fixed, the draw contained only four seeded pots, based on the predetermined pairings for the knockout phase, with the top-eight teams allocated based on their final position in the league phase. Teams in positions 1 to 8 were seeded (playing the second legs at home), while the bracket positions of the winners of the knockout phase play-offs (unseeded) were predetermined. The top-eight teams were drawn into the bracket against one of their two possible opponents.

1/2 vs 15/16/17/18		3/4 vs 13/14/19/20	
Seeded	Predetermined	Seeded	Predetermined
(France) Lyon; (England) Aston Villa	(Spain) Celta Vigo; (France) Lille	(Denmark) Midtjylland; (Spain) Real Betis	(Greece) Panathinaikos; (England) Nottingham Forest

5/6 vs 11/12/21/22		7/8 vs 9/10/23/24	
Seeded	Predetermined	Seeded	Predetermined
(Portugal) Porto; (Portugal) Braga	(Hungary) Ferencváros; (Germany) VfB Stuttgart	(Germany) SC Freiburg; (Italy) Roma	(Belgium) Genk; (Italy) Bologna

=== Summary ===
The first legs were played on 12 March, and the second legs were played on 18 and 19 March 2026.

Team 1	Agg.	Team 2	1st leg	2nd leg
Ferencváros (Hungary)	2–4	(Portugal) Braga	2–0	0–4
Panathinaikos (Greece)	1–4	(Spain) Real Betis	1–0	0–4
Genk (Belgium)	2–5	(Germany) SC Freiburg	1–0	1–5
Celta Vigo (Spain)	3–1	(France) Lyon	1–1	2–0
VfB Stuttgart (Germany)	1–4	(Portugal) Porto	1–2	0–2
Nottingham Forest (England)	2–2 (3–0 p)	(Denmark) Midtjylland	0–1	2–1 (a.e.t.)
Bologna (Italy)	5–4	(Italy) Roma	1–1	4–3 (a.e.t.)
Lille (France)	0–3	(England) Aston Villa	0–1	0–2

=== Matches ===
12 March 2026
21:00

Ferencváros (Hungary)	2–0	(Portugal) Braga
Kanichowsky 32'; Joseph 69'	Report

Ferencváros Stadion, Budapest
Attendance: 19,859
Referee: Nick Walsh (Scotland)
18 March 2026
16:30 (15:30 UTC+0)

Braga (Portugal)	4–0	(Hungary) Ferencváros
Horta 11', 53'; Grillitsch 15'; Martínez 34'	Report

Estádio Municipal, Braga
Attendance: 15,078
Referee: Glenn Nyberg (Sweden)

Braga won 4–2 on aggregate.

12 March 2026
18:45 (19:45 UTC+2)

Panathinaikos (Greece)	1–0	(Spain) Real Betis
Taborda 88' (pen.)	Report

Olympic Stadium, Athens
Attendance: 27,479
Referee: Szymon Marciniak (Poland)
19 March 2026
21:00

Real Betis (Spain)	4–0	(Greece) Panathinaikos
Ruibal 8'; Amrabat 45+1'; Hernández 53'; Antony 66'	Report

La Cartuja, Seville (Note: Real Betis played their home matches at La Cartuja, Seville, instead of their regular stadium, Benito Villamarín, Seville, due to renovation works.)
Attendance: 60,207
Referee: Tobias Stieler (Germany)

Real Betis won 4–1 on aggregate.

12 March 2026
21:00

Genk (Belgium)	1–0	(Germany) SC Freiburg
El Ouahdi 24'	Report

Cegeka Arena, Genk
Attendance: 15,550
Referee: Chris Kavanagh (England)
19 March 2026
18:45

SC Freiburg (Germany)	5–1	(Belgium) Genk
Ginter 19'; Matanović 25'; Grifo 53'; Suzuki 57'; Eggestein 79'	Report	Smets 39'

Europa-Park Stadion, Freiburg im Breisgau
Attendance: 33,000
Referee: Michael Oliver (England)

SC Freiburg won 5–2 on aggregate.

12 March 2026
21:00

Celta Vigo (Spain)	1–1	(France) Lyon
Rueda 25'	Report	Endrick 87'

Balaídos, Vigo
Attendance: 21,673
Referee: Erik Lambrechts (Belgium)
19 March 2026
18:45

Lyon (France)	0–2	(Spain) Celta Vigo
	Report	Rueda 61'; Jutglà 90+2'

Parc Olympique Lyonnais, Décines-Charpieu
Attendance: 41,764
Referee: Irfan Peljto (Bosnia and Herzegovina)

Celta Vigo won 3–1 on aggregate.

12 March 2026
18:45

VfB Stuttgart (Germany)	1–2	(Portugal) Porto
Undav 40'	Report	Moffi 21'; Mora 27'

MHPArena, Stuttgart
Attendance: 60,000
Referee: Donatas Rumšas (Lithuania)
19 March 2026
21:00 (20:00 UTC+0)

Porto (Portugal)	2–0	(Germany) VfB Stuttgart
William Gomes 21'; Froholdt 72'	Report

Estádio do Dragão, Porto
Attendance: 40,675
Referee: Anthony Taylor (England)

Porto won 4–1 on aggregate.

12 March 2026
21:00 (20:00 UTC+0)

Nottingham Forest (England)	0–1	(Denmark) Midtjylland
	Report	Cho Gue-sung 80'

City Ground, West Bridgford
Attendance: 29,502
Referee: Rade Obrenović (Slovenia)
19 March 2026
18:45

Midtjylland (Denmark)	1–2 (a.e.t.)	(England) Nottingham Forest
Erlić 69'	Report	Domínguez 41'; Yates 52'
Penalties
Cho Gue-sung (penalty missed); Şimşir (penalty missed); Chilufya (penalty missed)	0–3	(penalty scored) Gibbs-White; (penalty scored) Sangaré; (penalty scored) Williams

MCH Arena, Herning
Attendance: 10,554
Referee: Felix Zwayer (Germany)

2–2 on aggregate; Nottingham Forest won 3–0 on penalties.

12 March 2026
18:45

Bologna (Italy)	1–1	(Italy) Roma
Bernardeschi 50'	Report	Pellegrini 71'

Stadio Renato Dall'Ara, Bologna
Attendance: 26,277
Referee: Sven Jablonski (Germany)
19 March 2026
21:00

Roma (Italy)	3–4 (a.e.t.)	(Italy) Bologna
Ndicka 32'; Malen 69' (pen.); Pellegrini 80'	Report	Rowe 22'; Bernardeschi 45+2' (pen.); Castro 58'; Cambiaghi 111'

Stadio Olimpico, Rome
Attendance: 63,908
Referee: István Kovács (Romania)

Bologna won 5–4 on aggregate.

12 March 2026
18:45

Lille (France)	0–1	(England) Aston Villa
	Report	Watkins 61'

Stade Pierre-Mauroy, Villeneuve-d'Ascq
Attendance: 40,187
Referee: José María Sánchez Martínez (Spain)
19 March 2026
21:00 (20:00 UTC+0)

Aston Villa (England)	2–0	(France) Lille
McGinn 54'; Bailey 86'	Report

Villa Park, Birmingham
Attendance: 37,583
Referee: Davide Massa (Italy)

Aston Villa won 3–0 on aggregate.

== Quarter-finals ==
=== Summary ===
The first legs were played on 8 and 9 April, and the second legs were played on 16 April 2026.

Team 1	Agg.	Team 2	1st leg	2nd leg
Braga (Portugal)	5–3	(Spain) Real Betis	1–1	4–2
SC Freiburg (Germany)	6–1	(Spain) Celta Vigo	3–0	3–1
Porto (Portugal)	1–2	(England) Nottingham Forest	1–1	0–1
Bologna (Italy)	1–7	(England) Aston Villa	1–3	0–4

=== Matches ===
8 April 2026
18:45 (17:45 UTC+1)

Braga (Portugal)	1–1	(Spain) Real Betis
Grillitsch 5'	Report	Hernández 61' (pen.)

Estádio Municipal, Braga
Attendance: 20,847
Referee: Felix Zwayer (Germany)
16 April 2026
21:00

Real Betis (Spain)	2–4	(Portugal) Braga
Antony 13'; Ezzalzouli 26'	Report	Víctor 38'; Carvalho 49'; Horta 53' (pen.); Gorby 74'

La Cartuja, Seville
Attendance: 66,694
Referee: Davide Massa (Italy)

Braga won 5–3 on aggregate.

9 April 2026
21:00

SC Freiburg (Germany)	3–0	(Spain) Celta Vigo
Grifo 10'; Beste 32'; Ginter 78'	Report

Europa-Park Stadion, Freiburg im Breisgau
Attendance: 32,600
Referee: Glenn Nyberg (Sweden)
16 April 2026
18:45

Celta Vigo (Spain)	1–3	(Germany) SC Freiburg
Swedberg 90+1'	Report	Matanović 33'; Suzuki 39', 50'

Balaídos, Vigo
Attendance: 21,981
Referee: Anthony Taylor (England)

SC Freiburg won 6–1 on aggregate.

9 April 2026
21:00 (20:00 UTC+1)

Porto (Portugal)	1–1	(England) Nottingham Forest
William Gomes 11'	Report	Fernandes 13' (o.g.)

Estádio do Dragão, Porto
Attendance: 46,479
Referee: Marco Guida (Italy)
16 April 2026
21:00 (20:00 UTC+1)

Nottingham Forest (England)	1–0	(Portugal) Porto
Gibbs-White 12'	Report

City Ground, West Bridgford
Attendance: 29,560
Referee: Danny Makkelie (Netherlands)

Nottingham Forest won 2–1 on aggregate.

9 April 2026
21:00

Bologna (Italy)	1–3	(England) Aston Villa
Rowe 90'	Report	Konsa 44'; Watkins 51', 90+4'

Stadio Renato Dall'Ara, Bologna
Attendance: 31,142
Referee: Sandro Schärer (Switzerland)
16 April 2026
21:00 (20:00 UTC+1)

Aston Villa (England)	4–0	(Italy) Bologna
Watkins 16'; Buendía 26'; Rogers 39'; Konsa 89'	Report

Villa Park, Birmingham
Attendance: 41,662
Referee: José María Sánchez Martínez (Spain)

Aston Villa won 7–1 on aggregate.

== Semi-finals ==
=== Summary ===
The first legs were played on 30 April, and the second legs were played on 7 May 2026.

Team 1	Agg.	Team 2	1st leg	2nd leg
Braga (Portugal)	3–4	(Germany) SC Freiburg	2–1	1–3
Nottingham Forest (England)	1–4	(England) Aston Villa	1–0	0–4

=== Matches ===
30 April 2026
21:00 (20:00 UTC+1)

Braga (Portugal)	2–1	(Germany) SC Freiburg
Tıknaz 8'; Dorgeles 90+2'	Report	Grifo 16'

Estádio Municipal, Braga
Attendance: 27,161
Referee: Anthony Taylor (England)
7 May 2026
21:00

SC Freiburg (Germany)	3–1	(Portugal) Braga
Kübler 19', 72'; Manzambi 41'	Report	Víctor 79'

Europa-Park Stadion, Freiburg im Breisgau
Attendance: 33,700
Referee: Davide Massa (Italy)

SC Freiburg won 4–3 on aggregate.

30 April 2026
21:00 (20:00 UTC+1)

Nottingham Forest (England)	1–0	(England) Aston Villa
Wood 71' (pen.)	Report

City Ground, West Bridgford
Attendance: 29,790
Referee: João Pinheiro (Portugal)
7 May 2026
21:00 (20:00 UTC+1)

Aston Villa (England)	4–0	(England) Nottingham Forest
Watkins 36'; Buendía 58' (pen.); McGinn 77', 80'	Report

Villa Park, Birmingham
Attendance: 43,028
Referee: Glenn Nyberg (Sweden)

Aston Villa won 4–1 on aggregate.

== Final ==
The final was played on 20 May 2026 at the Beşiktaş Stadium in Istanbul. The winner of semi-final 1 was designated as the "home" team for administrative purposes.

20 May 2026
21:00 (22:00 UTC+3)

SC Freiburg (Germany)	0–3	(The Football Association) Aston Villa
	Report	Tielemans 41'; Buendía 45+3'; Rogers 58'

Beşiktaş Stadium, Istanbul
Attendance: 37,324
Referee: François Letexier (France)
