= Tolu Arokodare =

Nigerian footballer (born 2000)

- Arokodare in 2026

Personal information
- Full name: Toluwalase Emmanuel Arokodare
- Date of birth: 23 November 2000 (age 25)
- Place of birth: Festac Town, Lagos, Nigeria
- Height: 1.97 m (6 ft 6 in)
- Position: Striker

Team information
- Current team: Ajax (on loan from Wolverhampton Wanderers)
- Number: 99

Youth career
- Kash Academy
- International Sports Academy
- Flying Sports Academy
- Box2Box FC

Senior career*
Years	Team	Apps	(Gls)
2019–2023	Valmiera	32	(22)
2020–2021	→ 1. FC Köln (loan)	10	(0)
2021–2023	→ Amiens (loan)	55	(14)
2023–2025	Genk	95	(36)
2025–	Wolverhampton Wanderers	33	(3)
2026–	→ Ajax (loan)	9	(5)

International career^{‡}
2025–	Nigeria	14	(4)
- * Club domestic league appearances and goals as of 18:44, 25 October 2026 (UTC) ‡ National team caps and goals as of 19:45, 17 November 2026 (UTC)

Toluwalase Emmanuel "Tolu" Arokodare ( born 23 November 2000) is a Nigerian professional footballer who plays as a striker for Eredivisie club Ajax, on loan from Wolverhampton Wanderers, and the Nigeria national team.

Arokodare was the winner of the 2025 Ebony Shoe, awarded to the best player in Belgium representing an African country.

== Club career ==
During his youth in Nigeria, Tolu played for Kash Academy and Flying Sports Academy in Festac, as well as the Segun Odegbami International College and Sports Academy. He later joined the Box2Box FC academy in Surulere and had trials in Europe with SC Freiburg and Toulouse.

=== Valmieras ===
Tolu joined Latvian club Valmiera in June 2019.

==== Loan to Köln ====
In September 2020, Tolu was loaned to German club 1. FC Köln for the 2020–21 season. He made his professional debut in the Bundesliga on 26 September 2020, coming on as a substitute in the 76th minute for Sebastian Andersson in the 1–0 away loss to Arminia Bielefeld.

==== Loan to Amiens ====
On 28 June 2021, Tolu joined Ligue 2 club Amiens on a two-year loan deal with an option to buy.

=== Genk ===
On 31 January 2023, Tolu joined Belgian Pro League side Genk on a four-and-a-half-year deal, scoring on his debut as substitute against Gent in a 3–2 away win. He was involved for the rest of the season in Genk's title challenge – the club sat third before the final day and needed a home win over league leaders Royal Antwerp to clinch the club their first title since 2019, allied with second-placed Union Saint-Gilloise dropping points to Club Brugge. With results going Genk's way going into stoppage time, Toby Alderweireld equalised in the 94th minute for Antwerp. The match ended in a 2–2 draw, denying Genk the crown.

Tolu hit 20 goals in the 2024-25 Belgian Pro League season for Genk, earning him the Ebony Shoe as best player in Belgium of African extraction over teammate Zakaria El Ouahdi, Union-SG's Noah Sadiki and Promise David, and Club Brugge's Raphael Onyedika. For that 2024–25 campaign, Genk had led the league from August to April, but a late-season slump of one point in six games during the championship play-offs saw them fall down to third.

=== Wolverhampton Wanderers ===
On 1 September 2025, Tolu joined Premier League club Wolverhampton Wanderers on a four-year contract with the option of a further one year in a deal worth £23.4 million. He scored his first competitive goal in Wolves' EFL Cup third round win over Everton on 23 September, while his first Premier League goal came against Arsenal, where Wolves lost 2–1, on 13 December.

Fans from various countries directed racial abuse at Tolu after he missed a first-half penalty in the 1–0 away defeat to Crystal Palace on 22 February 2026. Wolves have released a statement "condemning this abhorrent and unlawful behaviour in the strongest possible terms".

On 20 July 2026, Wolves had to cancel their pre-season training session because Tolu, who was blocked from training with the rest of the squad under new manager Cesar Peixoto, refused to leave the training pitch. The next day, security was increased to prevent the player from entering the training ground.

==== Ajax loan ====
On 29 July 2026, Tolu joined Eredivisie club Ajax on a season-long loan with an option to buy.

== International career ==
In March 2025, Tolu received his first call-up to the Nigeria national team, making his debut on the 21st of the same month in a 2–0 away victory against Rwanda. On June 6, 2025, he scored his first goal for the Super Eagles in a 1–1 friendly draw with Russia.

== Personal life ==
Arokodare was born in Festac Town in Lagos, Nigeria. Known as a considerate and caring player, Tolu is a Christian and loves to show the beauty of his faith.

== Career statistics ==
=== Club ===
As of match played 8 November 2026

Appearances and goals by club, season and competition
Club	Season	League			National cup (Note: Includes Latvian Cup, DFB-Pokal, Coupe de France, Belgian Cup, FA Cup)		League cup (Note: Includes EFL Cup)		Continental		Total	
Club	Season	Division	Apps	Goals	Apps	Goals	Apps	Goals	Apps	Goals	Apps	Goals
Valmiera	2019	Virsliga	16	7	1	0	—		—		17	7
Valmiera	2020	Virsliga	16	15	—		—		1 (Note: Appearance in UEFA Europa League)	0	17	15
Valmiera	Total		32	22	1	0	—		1	0	34	22
1. FC Köln (loan)	2020–21	Bundesliga	10	0	1	0	—		—		11	0
Amiens (loan)	2021–22	Ligue 2	35	8	5	5	—		—		40	13
Amiens (loan)	2022–23	Ligue 2	20	6	3	2	—		—		23	8
Amiens (loan)	Total		55	14	8	7	—		—		63	21
Genk	2022–23	Belgian Pro League	11	2	—		—		—		11	2
Genk	2023–24	Belgian Pro League	40	12	1	0	—		11 (Note: Two appearances and two goals in UEFA Champions League, two appearances in UEFA Europa League, seven appearances and one goal in UEFA Europa Conference League)	3	52	15
Genk	2024–25	Belgian Pro League	40	21	5	2	—		—		45	23
Genk	2025–26	Belgian Pro League	4	1	—		—		1	0	5	1
Genk	Total		95	36	6	2	—		12	3	113	41
Wolverhampton Wanderers	2025–26	Premier League	33	3	3	1	2	2	—		38	6
Ajax (loan)	2026–27	Eredivisie	11	7	0	0	—		6 (Note: Appearances in UEFA Conference League)	6	17	13
Career total			236	82	19	10	2	2	19	9	276	103

=== International ===
As of match played 17 November 2026

Appearances and goals by national team and year
National team	Year	Apps	Goals
Nigeria	2025	10	2
Nigeria	2026	4	2
Total		14	4

Scores and results list Nigeria's goal tally first, score column indicates score after each Arokodare goal.

List of international goals scored by Tolu Arokodare
No.	Date	Venue	Opponent	Score	Result	Competition
1	6 June 2025	Luzhniki Stadium, Moscow, Russia	Russia	1–1	1–1	Friendly
2	6 September 2025	Godswill Akpabio International Stadium, Uyo, Nigeria	Rwanda	1–0	1–0	2026 FIFA World Cup qualification
3	13 November 2026	Godswill Akpabio International Stadium, Uyo, Nigeria	Tanzania	2–1	3–1	2027 Africa Cup of Nations qualification
4	13 November 2026	Godswill Akpabio International Stadium, Uyo, Nigeria	Tanzania	3–1	3–1	2027 Africa Cup of Nations qualification

== Honours ==
Individual

- Belgian Pro League top scorer: 2024–25
