= Konstantinos Karetsas =

Greek footballer (born 2007)

Konstantinos Karetsas Κωνσταντίνος Καρέτσας
Personal information
- Date of birth: 19 November 2007 (age 18)
- Place of birth: Genk, Belgium
- Height: 1.71 m (5 ft 7 in)
- Positions: Attacking midfielder; right winger

Team information
- Current team: Borussia Dortmund
- Number: 19

Youth career
- 2015–2020: Genk
- 2020–2023: Anderlecht

Senior career*
Years	Team	Apps	(Gls)
2023–2024	Jong Genk	20	(6)
2024–2026	Genk	72	(3)
2026–	Borussia Dortmund	5	(0)

International career^{‡}
2022	Belgium U15	1	(0)
2022–2023	Belgium U16	13	(3)
2023–2024	Belgium U17	4	(0)
2024	Belgium U21	2	(0)
2025–	Greece	14	(3)
- * Club domestic league appearances and goals as of 31 October 2026 ‡ National team caps and goals as of 4 October 2026

Konstantinos Karetsas (Greek: Κωνσταντίνος Καρέτσας; born 19 November 2007) is a professional footballer who plays as a right winger or attacking midfielder for Bundesliga club Borussia Dortmund. Born in Belgium, he represents the Greece national team.

== Club career ==
=== Genk ===
Karetsas came through the system at his home town club Genk before spending three years at Anderlecht. He then returned to Genk in January 2023.

He made his professional debut as a fifteen-year-old for Jong Genk in the opening game of the 2023–24 season. He scored three goals in his first seven league games. When he scored his first professional goal on 1 September 2023, in the Challenger Pro League against RSCA Futures, he became the youngest goalscorer in Belgian pro-league history.

After a few strong months at Jong Genk, Karetsas was promoted to Genk's first team in February 2024 together with teammate Noah Adedeji-Sternberg. He was given his official debut by coach Wouter Vrancken in the league match against Cercle Brugge on 4 May. In the 88th minute, Karetsas came on for Bilal El Khannouss. Two weeks later, interim head coach Domenico Olivieri give him a first-team start for the first time for the league match against Royal Antwerp and in the 28th minute, he provided the assist for the only goal of the game, scored by Andi Zeqiri.

Karetsas continued to impress in the opening weeks of the 2024–25 season, while still 16 years old, and was selected among The Guardian's 60 best young talents in world football selection for 2024.

=== Borussia Dortmund ===
On 3 August 2026, he moved to Germany and transferred to Bundesliga club Borussia Dortmund.

== International career ==
Karetsas was born in Belgium to Greek parents. He chose to represent the Greek international team. He is a former Belgian youth international.

Karetsas was selected by the Belgian Under-21s for European qualifiers against Scotland and Hungary in October 2024, coming on as a substitute in the latter match for this debut at that level.

In March 2025, FIFA approved the change of association Karetsas could represent from Belgium to Greece. He made his international debut as a substitute against Scotland on 20 March 2025 during the Nations League promotion/relegation play-offs. Three days later, he scored his first goal in a 3–0 away win against the same opponent, at the age of 17 years and 124 days, making him the youngest scorer in Greece's history as well as Nations League's history.

== Career statistics ==
=== Club ===
As of match played 4 November 2026

Appearances and goals by club, season and competition
Club	Season	League			National cup		Europe		Other		Total	
Club	Season	Division	Apps	Goals	Apps	Goals	Apps	Goals	Apps	Goals	Apps	Goals
Jong Genk	2023–24	Challenger Pro League	20	6	—		—		—		20	6
Genk	2023–24	Belgian Pro League	4	0	0	0	—		—		4	0
Genk	2024–25	Belgian Pro League	34	3	5	0	—		—		39	3
Genk	2025–26	Belgian Pro League	34	0	2	1	13 (Note: Appearances in UEFA Europa League)	2	—		48	3
Genk	Total		72	3	7	1	13	2	—		92	6
Borussia Dortmund	2026–27	Bundesliga	5	0	1	0	3 (Note: Appearances in UEFA Champions League)	1	1 (Note: Appearance in Franz Beckenbauer Supercup)	0	10	1
Career total			97	9	8	1	16	3	1	0	122	13

=== International ===
As of match played 4 October 2026

Appearances and goals by national team and year
National team	Year	Apps	Goals
Greece	2025	9	3
Greece	2026	5	0
Total		14	3

Scores and results list Greece's goal tally first, score column indicates score after each Karetsas goal.

List of international goals scored by Konstantinos Karetsas
No.	Date	Venue	Opponent	Score	Result	Competition
1	23 March 2025	Hampden Park, Glasgow, Scotland	Scotland	2–0	3–0	2024–25 UEFA Nations League promotion/relegation play-offs
2	5 September 2025	Karaiskakis Stadium, Piraeus, Greece	Belarus	1–0	5–1	2026 FIFA World Cup qualification
3	15 November 2025	Karaiskakis Stadium, Piraeus, Greece	Scotland	2–0	3–2	2026 FIFA World Cup qualification
