= Josue Kongolo =

Belgian footballer (born 2006)

Personal information
- Date of birth: 13 April 2006 (age 20)
- Place of birth: Ravels, Belgium
- Height: 1.84 m (6 ft 0 in)
- Position: Defender

Team information
- Current team: Genk
- Number: 44

Youth career
- –2015: Lierse
- 2015–2024: Genk

Senior career*
Years	Team	Apps	(Gls)
2023–	Jong Genk	37	(0)
2024–	Genk	32	(2)

International career^{‡}
2022	Belgium U16	1	(0)
2022–2023	Belgium U17	8	(0)
2023–2025	Belgium U19	14	(0)
2026–	Belgium U21	4	(0)
- * Club domestic league appearances and goals as of 25 October 2026 ‡ National team caps and goals as of 15:39, 18 November 2026 (UTC)

Josue Kongolo (born 13 April 2006) is a Belgian professional footballer who plays for Genk.

== Club career ==
Kongolo is a youth product from Genk. On 13 June 2022, he signed his first professional contract. On 31 May 2023, Kongolo extended his contract through 2026. He made his league debut on 26 May 2024 against Union Saint-Gilloise.

== International career ==
Born in Belgium, Kongolo is of DR Congolese descent. He is a youth international for Belgium.

== Career statistics ==
As of match played 25 October 2026

Appearances and goals by club, season and competition
Club	Season	League			Cup		Europe		Other		Total	
Club	Season	Division	Apps	Goals	Apps	Goals	Apps	Goals	Apps	Goals	Apps	Goals
Jong Genk	2022–23	Challenger Pro League	1	0	–		–		–		1	0
Jong Genk	2023–24	Challenger Pro League	27	0	–		–		–		27	0
Jong Genk	2024–25	Challenger Pro League	2	0	–		–		–		2	0
Jong Genk	Total		30	0	–		–		–		30	0
Genk	2023–24	Belgian Pro League	1	0	0	0	–		–		1	0
Genk	2024–25	Belgian Pro League	7	0	1	0	–		–		8	0
Genk	2025–26	Belgian Pro League	14	0	1	0	4 (Note: Appearances in UEFA Europa League)	0	—		19	0
Genk	2026–27	Belgian Pro League	9	2	1	0	—		—		10	2
Genk	Total		31	2	3	0	4	0	0	0	38	2
Career total			61	2	3	0	4	0	0	0	68	2
