= 2024–25 KRC Genk season =

KRC Genk
2024–25 season
- Chairman: Peter Croonen
- Manager: Thorsten Fink
- Stadium: Cegeka Arena
- Belgian Pro League Regular season: 1st
- Champions' Play-offs: 3rd
- Belgian Cup: Semi-finals
- Top goalscorer: League: Tolu Arokodare (20); All: Tolu Arokodare (22)
- Average home league attendance: 17,829
- Biggest win: Genk 4–0 Dender
- Biggest defeat: Genk 0–4 Union SG
Home colours	Away colours
- All statistics correct as of 11 May 2025.

The 2024–25 season is the 37th season in the history of the K.R.C. Genk as a football club, and the 29th consecutive season in Belgian Pro League. In addition to the domestic league, the team participated in the Belgian Cup.

== Transfers ==
=== In ===
Pos.	Player	Transferred from	Fee	Date	Source
DF	(Belgium) Jarne Steuckers	(Belgium) Sint-Truiden	Undisclosed	1 July 2024	
DF	(Venezuela) Adrián Palacios	(Colombia) Deportivo Cali	Undisclosed	1 July 2024	
DF	(Belgium) Matte Smets	(Belgium) Sint-Truiden	Undisclosed	1 July 2024	
FW	(South Korea) Oh Hyeon-gyu	(Scotland) Celtic	Undisclosed	14 July 2024	

=== Out ===
Pos.	Player	Transferred to	Fee	Date	Source
MF	(Belgium) Anouar Ait El Hadj	(Belgium) Union Saint-Gilloise	Undisclosed	13 July 2024	
MF	(Belgium) Aziz Ouattara Mohammed	(Belgium) Mechelen	Loan	23 July 2024	

== Friendlies ==
=== Pre-season ===
29 June 2024 Friendly	RC Hades (Belgium)	1–4	(Belgium) Genk	Hasselt
13:30	Kessels 73'	Report	Arokodare 28', 39'; Adedeji-Sternberg 36'; Ouattara 45'	Stadium: Sportcentrum Kiewit

6 July 2024 Friendly	Genk (Belgium)	3–3	(Belgium) Charleroi	Genk
12:00	Nkuba 37'; Zeqiri 91'; El Ouahdi 103'	Report	Guiagon 42'; Heymans 60'; Benbouali 65'	Stadium: Jos Vaessen Talent Academy
Note: 2 x 60 minutes

10 July 2024 Friendly	PAOK (Greece)	1–3	(Belgium) Genk	Netherlands
18:00	Baba 45+4'	Report	Adedeji-Sternberg 6'; Steuckers 10'; Zeqiri 85'
Note: 2 x 60 minutes

13 July 2024 Friendly	Feyenoord (Netherlands)	3–1	(Belgium) Genk	Rotterdam, Netherlands
13:00	Kayembe 7' (o.g.); Paixão 60'; Milambo 86'	Report	Bonsu Baah 20'	Stadium: Stadion Feijenoord

17 July 2024 Friendly	Genk (Belgium)	1–2	(Netherlands) Go Ahead Eagles
12:00	85'		Valaker Edvardsen 19'; Adekanye 58'

20 July 2024 Friendly	Genk (Belgium)	2–2	(France) Lille	Genk
18:30	38'; 39'		7'; 75'	Stadium: Cegeka Arena

== Competitions ==
=== Overall record ===
Competition	First match	Last match	Starting round	Final position	Record							
Competition	First match	Last match	Starting round	Final position	Pld	W	D	L	GF	GA	GD	Win %
Belgian Pro League regular season	28 July 2024	16 March 2025	Matchday 1		26	19	3	4	51	31	+20	73.08
Belgian Cup	30 October 2024	5 February 2025	Round of 32	Semi-finals	5	3	1	1	10	4	+6	60.00
Total					31	22	4	5	61	35	+26	70.97

Last updated: 14 February 2025
Source: Soccerway

=== Belgian Pro League ===
==== Regular season ====
Pos	Team	Pld	W	D	L	GF	GA	GD	Pts	Qualification or relegation
1	Genk	30	21	5	4	55	33	+22	68	Qualification for the Champions' Play-offs (Note: The regular season winner will qualify for the 2025–26 UEFA Europa League if not earning 2025–26 UEFA Champions League in the playoff.)
2	Club Brugge	30	17	8	5	65	36	+29	59	Qualification for the Champions' play-offs
3	Union SG	30	15	10	5	49	25	+24	55	Qualification for the Champions' play-offs
4	Anderlecht	30	15	6	9	50	27	+23	51	Qualification for the Champions' play-offs
5	Antwerp	30	12	10	8	47	32	+15	46	Qualification for the Champions' play-offs

Source: Jupiler Pro League (in Dutch), Soccerway
Rules for classification: 1) Points; 2) Matches won; 3) Goal difference; 4) Goals scored; 5) Away matches won; 6) Away goal difference; 7) Away goals scored; 8) Play-off.

==== Results summary ====
Overall								Home						Away					
Pld	W	D	L	GF	GA	GD	Pts	W	D	L	GF	GA	GD	W	D	L	GF	GA	GD
26	19	3	4	51	31	+20	60	12	1	0	28	8	+20	7	2	4	23	23	0

Last updated: 14 February 2025.

==== Results by round ====
Round	1	2	3	4	5	6	7	8	9	10	11	12	13	14	15	16	17	18	19	20	21	22	23	24	25	26	27	28	29	30
Ground	H	A	H	A	A	H	A	H	H	A	H	A	H	A	H	A	H	A	H	A	H	A	A	H	H	A	H	A	A	H
Result	D	L	W	W	W	W	W	W	W	L	W	W	W	L	W	D	W	L	W	D	W	W	W	W	W	W	D	D	W	W
Position	7	13	9	5	6	2	1	1	1	1	1	1	1	1	1	1	1	1	1	1	1	1	1	1	1	1	1	1	1	1

Updated to match(es) played on 14 February 2025. Source: Worldfootball
A = Away; H = Home; W = Win; D = Draw; L = Loss

==== Matches ====
The match schedule was released on 11 June 2024.

28 July 2024 1	Genk	0–0	Standard Liège	Genk
13:30 CEST (UTC+2)		Report	Price (yellow card) 21'; Houtekiet (yellow card) 28'; O'Neill (yellow card) 63'; Bulat (yellow card) 63'	Stadium: Cegeka Arena; Attendance: 18,471; Referee: Lothar D'hondt

3 August 2024 2	OH Leuven	3–1	Genk	Heverlee
18:15 CEST (UTC+2)	Akimoto (yellow card) 21'; Maziz 22'; Vlietinck 36'; Banzuzi (yellow card) 70'; Þorsteinsson 85'	Report	Bangoura (yellow card) 35'; Fadera (yellow card) 45+2'; Arokodare 62'	Stadium: Den Dreef; Attendance: 7,418; Referee: Wesli De Cremer

11 August 2024 3	Genk	3–2	Club Brugge	Genk
13:30 CEST (UTC+2)	Nkuba (yellow card) 38'; Steuckers 68' (pen.); Arokodare 83'; Hrošovský 90+4'; Kayembe (yellow card) 90+12'	Report	Vetlesen (yellow card) 16'; Skov Olsen 45', 60'; tzolis (yellow card) 74'	Stadium: Cegeka Arena; Attendance: 18,542; Referee: Nicolas Laforge

17 August 2024 4	Beerschot	3–4	Genk	Antwerp
16:00 CEST (UTC+2)	Henderson 6'; Weymans (yellow card) 38'; Michez (yellow card) 45', (goal) 60'; Cagro 78'; Tshimanga 86'	Report	Steuckers 14'; Arokodare 29', 63'; Cuesta 39'; Sadick (red card) 75'; El Ouahdi (yellow card) 90+6'	Stadium: Olympisch Stadium; Attendance: 4,500; Referee: Wim Smet

30 August 2024 6	Genk	1–0	Westerlo	Genk
20:45 CEST (UTC+2)	Karetsas (yellow card) 55'; Sattleberger 81'	Report	Alcócer (yellow card) 53'; Rommens (yellow card) 79'; Sydorchuk (yellow card) 82'; Haspolat (yellow card) 90'; Seigers (yellow card) 90+4'	Stadium: Cegeka Arena; Attendance: 17,518; Referee: Lothar D'hondt

14 September 2024 7	Cercle Brugge	2–3	Genk	Brugge
16:00 CEST (UTC+2)	Ouattara 13'; Ravych 20'	Report	Sor 1'; Steuckers 17'; Arokodare 55'; Kayembe (yellow card) 90+4'	Stadium: Jan Breydel Stadium; Attendance: 4,404; Referee: Bert Put

17 September 2024 5	Anderlecht	0–2	Genk	Anderlecht
20:00 CEST (UTC+2)	Ashimeru (yellow card) 81'	Report	Steuckers 7'; Sadick 37'; Hrošovský (yellow card) 71'; El Ouahdi (yellow card) 74'; Adedeji-Sternberg 86'	Stadium: Constant Vanden Stock Stadium; Attendance: 21,900; Referee: Erik Lambrechts
Note: The match originally scheduled for 23 August 2024 was postponed due to Anderlecht's participation in the Europa League.

22 September 2024 8	Genk	4–0	Dender	Genk
18:30 CEST (UTC+2)	Arokodare 23'; Bonsu Baah 53'; Hrošovský 76'; Hyeon-gyu 83'	Report	Cools (yellow card) 55'; Ruyssen (yellow card) 68'	Stadium: Cegeka Arena; Attendance: 16,858; Referee: Wesli De Cremer

28 September 2024 9	Genk	2–1	Mechelen	Genk
16:30 CEST (UTC+2)	Sadick (yellow card) 57'; Hyeon-gyu 76', 90+7', (yellow card) 90+8'	Report	Pflücke (yellow card) 45'; Mrabti 60'; Belghali (yellow card) 87'	Stadium: Cegeka Arena; Attendance: 16,858; Referee: Jasper Vergoote

5 October 2024 10	Kortrijk	2–1	Genk	Kortrijk
18:30 CEST (UTC+2)	Nacho 16', 19'; Dejaegere (yellow card) 26'; Sissako (yellow card) 54'; Silva (yellow card) 78'	Report	Bonsu Baah 6', (yellow card) 33'	Stadium: Guldensporen Stadion; Attendance: 6,486; Referee: Simon Bourdeaud'hui

20 October 2024 11	Genk	3–2	STVV	Genk
13:30 CEST (UTC+2)	Arokodare 18'; Steuckers 31'; El Ouahdi 45'; Smets (yellow card) 59'	Report	Taniguchi (red card) 15'; Bertaccini 34', 58'; Patris (yellow card) 48'; Godeau (yellow card) 74'; Brahimi (yellow card) 74' (yellow-red card) 90+5'	Stadium: Cegeka Arena; Attendance: 21,889; Referee: Lawrence Visser

27 October 2024 12	Gent	0–2	Genk	Ghent
19:30 CEST (UTC+2)	Samoise (yellow card) 37'; Delorge (yellow card) 85'	Report	Arokodare 46', (yellow card) 76'; Steuckers 58' (pen.); Hrošovský (yellow card) 69'	Stadium: Arteveldestadion; Attendance: 17,020; Referee: Nicolas Laforge

3 November 2024 13	Genk	2–0	Royal Antwerp	Genk
13:30 CET (UTC+1)	Smets (yellow card) 27'; Hrošovský 45+1', 54'; Sadick (yellow card) 61'	Report	Costa (yellow card) 77'; Alderweireld (yellow card) 82'	Stadium: Cegeka Arena; Attendance: 20,407; Referee: Lothar D'hondt

10 November 2024 14	Union SG	4–0	Genk	Brussels
18:30 CET (UTC+1)	Lapoussin 5'; David 45+1', 64'; Sadiki 51'; Kōki (yellow card) 55'; Burgess (yellow card) 73'	Report	Sadick (yellow card) 51'; Heynen (yellow card) 56'; Van Crombrugge (yellow card) 57'; Arokodare (yellow card) 74'	Stadium: Joseph Marien Stadium; Attendance: 8,427; Referee: Erik Lambrechts

23 November 2024 15	Genk	3–0	Sporting Charleroi	Genk
20:45 CET (UTC+1)	Sattlberger (yellow card) 46'; Arokodare 77'; Steuckers 83'; Noah Adedeji-Sternberg 90'	Report	Ousou (yellow card) 54'; Heymans (yellow card) 64'; De Mil (yellow card) 57'; Arokodare (yellow card) 90+1'	Stadium: Cegeka Arena; Attendance: 15,941; Referee: Bram Van Driessche

1 December 2024 16	STVV	2–2	Genk	Sint-Truiden
13:30 CET (UTC+1)	Belaïd (yellow card) 32'; Bertaccini 66', 77'; Fujita (yellow card) 73'	Report	Arokodare 26'; Steuckers (yellow card) 45+5'; Kokubo 90+3' (o.g.)	Stadium: Stayen; Attendance: 10,073; Referee: Erik Lambrechts

7 December 2024 17	Genk	3–2	Kortrijk	Genk
16:00 CET (UTC+1)	Cuesta (yellow card) 23'; Sadick (yellow card) 28'; Hrošovský 41', 47'; Van Crombrugge (yellow card) 54'; Adedeji-Sternberg 68'; El Ouahdi (yellow card) 90+4'	Report	Dewaele 4'; Lagae (yellow card) 43'; Messaoudi (yellow card) 54'; Nacho (yellow card) 76'; Ambrose 90+1'	Stadium: Cegeka Arena; Attendance: 15,273; Referee: Simon Bourdeaud'hui

15 December 2024 18	Club Brugge	2–0	Genk	Brugge
13:30 CET (UTC+1)	Ordóñez (yellow card) 70'; Mechele 77'; Vanaken (yellow card) 81'; Skov Olsen 86', (yellow card) 90+3'	Report	Sadick (yellow card) 39'; Arokodare 73'	Stadium: Jan Breydel Stadium; Attendance: 25,000; Referee: Jasper Vergoote

22 December 2024 19	Genk	2–0	Anderlecht	Genk
13:30 CET (UTC+1)	Cuesta (yellow card) 25'; Arokodare 29'; Karetsas 72'	Report	Dendoncker (yellow card) 48'	Stadium: Cegeka Arena; Attendance: 21,685; Referee: Jan Boterberg

26 December 2024 20	Royal Antwerp	2–2	Genk	Antwerp
13:30 CET (UTC+1)	Kerk 9', 32'; Van Den Bosch (yellow card) 83'; Corbanie (yellow card) 90'	Report	Arokodare 12', 51'; Nkuba (yellow card) 62'	Stadium: Bosuilstadion; Attendance: 14,000; Referee: Lothar D'hondt

11 January 2025 21	Genk	2–0	OH Leuven	Genk
18:15 CET (UTC+1)	Smets (red card) 6'; Steuckers 48' (pen.); Oh Hyeon-gyu 84' (pen.); Cuesta (yellow card) 87'	Report	Kuruçay (yellow card) 46'; Leysen (yellow card) 62'; Osifo (yellow card) 90+6'	Stadium: Cegeka Arena; Attendance: 16,475; Referee: Bert Put

18 January 2025 22	Mechelen	1–2	Genk	Mechelen
18:15 CET (UTC+1)	Raman 8'; Hairemans (yellow card) 24'; Ouattara (yellow card) 32'	Report	Karetsas 15'; El Ouahdi 25'; Sattlberger (yellow card) 62'	Stadium: Achter de Kazerne; Attendance: 13,847; Referee: Kevin van Damme

25 January 2025 23	Westerlo	1–2	Genk	Westerlo
16:00 CET (UTC+1)	Sakamoto 87'; Bos (yellow card) 90+2'	Report	El Ouahdi 18', (yellow card) 75'; Arokodare 30'; Bangoura (yellow card) 54'; Nkuba (yellow card) 90+5'	Stadium: Het Kuipje; Attendance: 7,000; Referee: Jan Boterberg

1 February 2025 24	Genk	1–0	Beerschot	Genk
20:45 CET (UTC+1)	Kayembe 30'; Heynen (yellow card) 87'	Report	Sahabo (yellow card) 69'; Cagro (red card) 75'	Stadium: Cegeka Arena; Attendance: 16,356; Referee: Lothar D'Hondt

8 February 2025 25	Genk	2–1	Cercle Brugge	Genk
20:45 CET (UTC+1)	Steuckers 18' (pen.); Oh Hyeon-gyu 40'	Report	Somers 10'; Perrin (yellow card) 58'; Delanghe (red card) 82'; Diakité (yellow card) 89'	Stadium: Cegeka Arena; Attendance: 15,112; Referee: Kevin van Damme

14 February 2025 26	Standard Liège	1–2	Genk	Liège
20:45 CET (UTC+1)	Šutalo (yellow card) 46'; Eckert 90+9' (pen.)	Report	Bonsu Baah 35'; Bangoura (yellow card) 56'; Arokodare 78'; Penders (yellow card) 89' (yellow-red card) 90+4'	Stadium: Stade Maurice Dufrasne; Attendance: 20,621; Referee: Jan Boterberg

23 February 2025 27	Genk	0–0	Gent

28 February 2025 28	Charleroi	1–1	Genk

8 March 2025 29	Dender	0–1	Genk

15 March 2025 30	Genk	2–1	Union Saint-Gilloise

==== Results summary ====
Overall								Home						Away					
Pld	W	D	L	GF	GA	GD	Pts	W	D	L	GF	GA	GD	W	D	L	GF	GA	GD
0	0	0	0	0	0	0	0	0	0	0	0	0	0	0	0	0	0	0	0

Source: Worldfootball

==== Results by round ====
Round	1
Ground	
Result	
Position	

Source: Worldfootball
A = Away; H = Home; W = Win; D = Draw; L = Loss

==== Matches ====
TBD 2025 1	v
TBD

=== Belgian Cup ===
30 October 2024 Seventh round	Beveren	0–2	Genk	Beveren
20:00 CET	Luiz (yellow card) 40'	Report	Oh Hyeon-gyu 66' (pen.), (yellow card) 80'; Steuckers 90'; Nkuba (yellow card) 90'	Stadium: Freethiel Stadion; Attendance: 3,600; Referee: Ken Vermeiren

4 December 2024 Eighth round	Genk	2–1	Standard Liège	Genk
20:30 CET	Karetsas (yellow card) 33'; Bangoura (yellow card) 49'; Arokodare 72'; Hrošovský 115'; Sattlberger (yellow card) 117'	Report	O'Neill (yellow card) 39'; Zeqiri 65'	Stadium: Cegeka Arena; Attendance: 11,116; Referee: Nicolas Laforge

7 January 2025 Quarter-finals	Sint-Truiden	0–4	Genk	Sint-Truiden
20:45 CET	Yamamoto (yellow card) 45+1'; Godeau (yellow card) 49'; Patris (yellow card) 69'	Report	Nkuba (yellow card) 3'; Oh Hyeon-gyu 29', 51'; El Ouahdi 63', (yellow card) 69'; Adedeji-Sternberg 81'	Stadium: Stayen; Attendance: 8,500; Referee: Nathan Verboomen

15 January 2025 Semi-finals first legs	Club Brugge	2–1	Genk	Brugge
20:45 CET	Ordóñez 34'; Tzolis 75' (pen.); Vanaken (yellow card) 82'; Vermant (yellow card) 90'; Jashari (yellow card) 90'	Report	Arokodare 29'; Sadick (yellow card) 29'; Bonsu Baah (yellow card) 35'; Bangoura (yellow card) 39'	Stadium: Jan Breydel Stadium; Attendance: 22,000; Referee: Lawrence Visser

5 February 2025 Semi-finals second legs	Genk	1–1 (2–3 agg.)	Club Brugge	Genk
20:45 CET	El Ouahdi 15'; Nkuba (yellow card) 79'; Sadick (yellow card) 87'		Ordóñez 25'; Onyedika (yellow card) 84'; Jashari (yellow card) 90+2'	Stadium: Cegeka Arena; Attendance: 21,061; Referee: Nicolas Laforge
