= Ken Nkuba =

Belgian footballer

Personal information
- Full name: Ken Nkuba Tshiend
- Date of birth: 21 January 2002 (age 24)
- Place of birth: Mons, Belgium
- Height: 1.80 m (5 ft 11 in)
- Position: Forward

Team information
- Current team: Genk
- Number: 27

Senior career*
Years	Team	Apps	(Gls)
2018–2024	Charleroi	59	(5)
2023	Zébra Élites	1	(0)
2024–	Genk	39	(1)

International career^{‡}
2019	Belgium U17	1	(0)
2019	Belgium U18	4	(1)
2019–2020	Belgium U19	3	(0)
2022–2023	Belgium U21	4	(0)
- * Club domestic league appearances and goals as of 16 May 2026 ‡ National team caps and goals as of 20:34, 27 March 2023 (UTC)

Ken Nkuba Tshiend (born 21 January 2002) is a Belgian professional footballer who plays as a forward for Genk.

== Club career ==
On 26 October 2018, Nkuba signed his first professional contract with Charleroi at the age of 16. Nkuba made his professional debut with Charleroi on the same day, in a 2–1 Belgian First Division A loss to Gent.

On 30 January 2024, Nkuba signed a contract with Genk until June 2028.

== International career ==
Born in Belgium, Nkuba is of Congolese descent. He is a youth international for Belgium.

== Career statistics ==
As of match played 16 May 2026

Appearances and goals by club, season and competition
Club	Season	League			Cup		Europe		Other		Total	
Club	Season	Division	Apps	Goals	Apps	Goals	Apps	Goals	Apps	Goals	Apps	Goals
Charleroi	2018–19	Belgian Pro League	2	0	0	0	—		—		2	0
Charleroi	2020–21	Belgian Pro League	11	0	0	0	1 (Note: Appearances in UEFA Europa League)	0	—		12	0
Charleroi	2021–22	Belgian Pro League	14	1	0	0	—		—		14	1
Charleroi	2022–23	Belgian Pro League	28	4	1	0	—		—		29	4
Charleroi	2023–24	Belgian Pro League	4	0	0	0	—		—		4	0
Charleroi	Total		59	5	1	0	1	0	—		61	5
Zébra Élites	2023–24	Belgian Division 3	1	0	—		—		—		1	0
Genk	2023–24	Belgian Pro League	5	0	0	0	0	0	0	0	5	0
Genk	2024–25	Belgian Pro League	21	0	4	0	0	0	0	0	25	0
Genk	2025–26	Belgian Pro League	13	1	0	0	6	0	—		19	1
Genk	Total		39	1	4	0	6	0	0	0	51	1
Career total			99	6	5	0	7	0	0	0	111	6
