= Lucca Brughmans =

Belgian footballer (born 2008)

Personal information
- Full name: Lucca Kiaba Mounganga Brughmans
- Date of birth: 27 June 2008 (age 18)
- Place of birth: Antwerp, Belgium
- Height: 1.97 m (6 ft 6 in)
- Position: Goalkeeper

Team information
- Current team: Genk
- Number: 28

Youth career
- 2014–2015: K. Kalmthout SK
- 2015–2016: FC Beigem
- 2016–2018: K. Kalmthout SK
- 2018–2019: Royal Antwerp
- 2019–2022: PSV
- 2022–2024: Genk

Senior career*
Years	Team	Apps	(Gls)
2024–2026	Jong Genk	32	(0)
2024–	Genk	18	(0)
2027–	Liverpool	0	(0)

International career^{‡}
2023	Belgium U15	4	(0)
2023–2024	Belgium U16	5	(0)
2024–2025	Belgium U17	9	(0)
2025–2026	Belgium U18	7	(0)
2026–	Belgium U21	4	(0)
- * Club domestic league appearances and goals as of 25 October 2026 ‡ National team caps and goals as of 15:23, 18 November 2026 (UTC)

Lucca Kiaba Mounganga Brughmans (born 27 June 2008) is a Belgian professional footballer who plays as a goalkeeper for Belgian Pro League club Genk. He has agreed to join Premier League club Liverpool on 1 July 2027.

== Career ==
=== Belgium ===
Brughmans began playing football with K. Kalmthout SK in 2014, followed by a year-long stint at FC Beigem, before returning to Kalmthout. At the age of 11 he moved to academy of the Dutch club PSV where he stayed for 3 seasons. In 2022 he returned to Belgium with Genk, and on 4 August 2023 signed his first professional contract with the club for 3 seasons. He started appearing as the reserve goalkeeper for Genk's reserves, and made his senior debut with Jong Genk in a 2–2 Challenger Pro League tie with RFC Seraing on 19 January 2025.

=== Liverpool ===
On 1 September 2026, Brughmans agreed to join Liverpool from the 2027–28 season under a pre‑contract deal, with the transfer fee reported at £30m including add-ons.

== International career ==
Born in Belgium, Brughmans is of Belgian and Congolese descent. He is a youth international for Belgium, having been called up to the Belgium U17s in 2024.

== Career statistics ==
As of match played 25 October 2026

Appearances and goals by club, season and competition
Club	Season	League			Cup		Europe		Other		Total	
Club	Season	Division	Apps	Goals	Apps	Goals	Apps	Goals	Apps	Goals	Apps	Goals
Jong Genk	2024–25	Challenger Pro League	11	0	—		—		—		11	0
Jong Genk	2025–26	Challenger Pro League	21	0	—		—		—		21	0
Jong Genk	Total		32	0	—		—		—		32	0
Genk	2025–26	Belgian Pro League	9	0	—		—		—		9	0
Genk	2026–27	Belgian Pro League	9	0	0	0	—		—		9	0
Genk	Total		18	0	0	0	0	0	—		18	0
Career total			50	0	0	0	0	0	0	0	50	0
