= Peter Balette =

Belgian football coach

Personal information
- Date of birth: 11 April 1961 (age 65)
- Place of birth: Heusden, Belgium
- Position: Midfielder

Senior career*
Years	Team	Apps	(Gls)
1979–1983	SK Heusden		
1983–1986	Berkenbos VV		
1986–1989	Tervant AC		
1989–1993	SK Heusden		
1993–1996	Lanaken VV		

Managerial career
- 1996–1998: K. Kabouters Opglabbeek
- 1998–2001: Verbroedering Meerhout
- 2001–2005: Heusden-Zolder
- 2005–2006: KVSK United
- 2007–2011: Club Brugge (assistant)
- 2011–2013: Standard Liège (assistant and caretaker)
- 2013–2014: Gent (assistant)
- 2014: Gent (caretaker)
- 2015–2016: Genk (assistant)
- 2016–2017: Gent (assistant)
- 2017: Gent (caretaker)
- 2017–2020: Gent (assistant)
- 2020: Gent (technical director)
- 2020-2021: Gent (assistant)
- 2021-2024: Gent (teammanager)
- 2024: Schalke 04 (assistant)
- 2026-: Genk (assistant)
- * Club domestic league appearances and goals

Peter Balette (born 11 April 1961) is a Belgian football coach. He is currently technical director at K.A.A. Gent.

== Coaching career ==
As of 9 June 2007, he was working at Club Brugge, first as the assistant to Jacky Mathijssen, and later on as the assistant to Matthijssens' successor, Adrie Koster. In June 2011, the contract between Club Bruges and Balette was broken by mutual agreement. He became the assistant coach at Standard Liège from June 2011, under José Riga, and, starting on 29 May 2012, under Ron Jans. After Jans' dismissal on 23 October 2012, he was the interim head coach, and on 27 October 2012, he became the assistant to Mircea Rednic. Before the start of the 2013–14 season, he was fired along with Rednic. When Rednic signed at KAA Gent on 1 October 2013, he took Balette as his assistant. On 9 April 2014, Balette became the head coach, assisted by Bernd Thijs, after Rednic was sent away due to disappointing results. In the 2015–2016 season, he was the assistant coach at K.R.C. Genk, with head coach Peter Maes. After one season at Genk, he returned to K.A.A. Gent.
