= Mujaid Sadick =

Spanish footballer

Mujaid
Personal information
- Full name: Mujaid Sadick Aliu
- Date of birth: 14 March 2000 (age 26)
- Place of birth: Logroño, Spain
- Height: 1.85 m (6 ft 1 in)
- Position: Centre-back

Team information
- Current team: Rayo Vallecano (on loan from Genk)

Youth career
- Valvanera
- 2016–2018: Deportivo La Coruña

Senior career*
Years	Team	Apps	(Gls)
2017–2019	Deportivo B	26	(0)
2018–2021	Deportivo La Coruña	30	(0)
2021–	Genk	128	(5)
2022–2023	Jong Genk	3	(0)
2026–	→ Rayo Vallecano (loan)	4	(0)

International career^{‡}
2017	Spain U17	3	(0)
2018	Spain U18	1	(0)
- * Club domestic league appearances and goals as of 24 October 2026 ‡ National team caps and goals as of 26 June 2018

Mujaid Sadick Aliu (born 14 March 2000), simply known as Mujaid, is a Spanish professional footballer who plays as a central defender for Rayo Vallecano, on loan from Belgian club Genk.

== Club career ==
=== Deportivo La Coruña ===
Born in Logroño, La Rioja to parents from Nigeria and Ghana, Mujaid joined Deportivo de La Coruña's youth setup in 2016, from Valvanera CD. He made his senior debut with the reserves on 22 October 2017, coming on as a late substitute for Ismael Díaz in a 2–1 Segunda División B away win against CDA Navalcarnero.

Mujaid made his first team – and La Liga – debut on 12 May 2018, replacing Juanfran late into a 2–4 home loss against Villarreal CF.

=== Genk ===
In May 2021, Mujaid agreed to a deal with Belgian club KRC Genk for a rumoured fee of around € 2 million. On 6 December 2024, he renewed his contract with the club until 2028.

==== Loan to Rayo Vallecano ====
On 1 September 2026, Mujaid returned to Spain and its top tier, after agreeing to a one-year loan deal with Rayo Vallecano.

== Career statistics ==
=== Club ===
As of match played 24 October 2026

Appearances and goals by club, season and competition
Club	Season	League			National cup		Continental		Other		Total	
Club	Season	Division	Apps	Goals	Apps	Goals	Apps	Goals	Apps	Goals	Apps	Goals
Deportivo B	2017–18	Segunda División B	3	0	—		—		—		3	0
Deportivo B	2018–19	Segunda División B	14	0	—		—		—		14	0
Deportivo B	2019–20	Tercera División	9	0	—		—		—		9	0
Deportivo B	Total		26	0	—		—		—		26	0
Deportivo La Coruña	2017–18	La Liga	2	0	0	0	—		—		2	0
Deportivo La Coruña	2019–20	Segunda División	28	0	1	0	—		—		29	0
Deportivo La Coruña	2020–21	Segunda División B	22	0	2	0	—		—		24	0
Deportivo La Coruña	Total		52	0	3	0	—		—		55	0
Genk	2021–22	Belgian Pro League	25	2	1	0	6 (Note: Two appearances in UEFA Champions League, Four appearances in UEFA Europa League)	0	1 (Note: Appearance(s) in Belgian Super Cup)	0	33	2
Genk	2022–23	Belgian Pro League	9	0	0	0	—		—		9	0
Genk	2023–24	Belgian Pro League	27	0	1	0	6 (Note: Appearance(s) in UEFA Europa Conference League)	0	—		34	0
Genk	2024–25	Belgian Pro League	37	1	3	0	—		—		40	1
Genk	2025–26	Belgian Pro League	30	2	0	0	12 (Note: Appearance(s) in UEFA Europa League)	0	—		42	2
Genk	Total		128	5	5	0	24	0	1	0	158	5
Jong Genk	2022–23	Challenger Pro League	3	0	—		—		—		3	0
Rayo Vallecano (loan)	2026–27	La Liga	4	0	0	colspan="2"|—	—		4	0		
Career total			213	5	9	0	24	0	1	0	247	5

== Honours ==
Spain U18

- Mediterranean Games: Gold Medal 2018
