= Jarne Steuckers =

Belgian footballer (born 2002)

Personal information
- Date of birth: 4 February 2002 (age 24)
- Place of birth: Sint-Truiden, Belgium
- Height: 1.79 m (5 ft 10 in)
- Position: Midfielder

Team information
- Current team: VfL Bochum (on loan from KRC Genk)
- Number: 14

Youth career
- 2008–2012: Sint-Truiden
- 2012–2017: KRC Genk
- 2017–2021: Sint-Truiden

Senior career*
Years	Team	Apps	(Gls)
2021–2024	Sint-Truiden	41	(6)
2022–2023	→ MVV Maastricht (loan)	36	(9)
2024–	KRC Genk	66	(8)
2026–	→ VfL Bochum (loan)	0	(0)

International career^{‡}
2024	Belgium U21	6	(2)
- * Club domestic league appearances and goals as of 28 August 2026 ‡ National team caps and goals as of 18:44, 30 November 2024 (UTC)

Jarne Steuckers (born 4 February 2002) is a Belgian professional footballer who plays as a midfielder for 2. Bundesliga club VfL Bochum on loan from Belgian Pro League club KRC Genk.

== Club career ==
=== Sint-Truiden ===
Steuckers was born and raised in Sint-Truiden, Limburg. He started his youth training at Sint-Truidense VV, the professional football club from his hometown. In 2012, he moved to the youth team of KRC Genk, but returned to Sint-Truiden four years later, where he signed his first professional contract in May 2020.

After impressing with the under-23s, coach Peter Maes promoted Steuckers to the first-team squad in January 2021. On 17 January 2021, he made his official debut in the Belgian Pro League in the home game against Oud-Heverlee Leuven. In the 72nd minute, Steuckers replaced Yuma Suzuki as Sint-Truiden were up 3–1 which was also the final result in the match. Later that season, he was given more playing opportunities by Maes. On 3 February 2021, for example, he made his first ever start in a Belgian Cup match against Lokeren-Temse. On the penultimate matchday of the regular season, Steuckers, who had been sidelined with a COVID-19 infection a month earlier, was given his first starting berth in the Belgian Pro League against his former youth club Genk.

Steuckers put in strong performances during the 2021–22 pre-season under new coach Bernd Hollerbach, but a foot injury threw a spanner in the works. In late November 2021 he made his comeback in a friendly. Under Hollerbach, he struggled to return to first-team action and he made no appearances the remainder of the season.

==== Loan to MVV Maastricht ====
He signed a new contract with Sint-Truiden in July 2022, and was sent on a season-long loan to Dutch second-tier Eerste Divisie club MVV Maastricht on 4 August 2022. Sint-Truiden announced on 9 February 2023 that Steuckers would return to the club after his loan spell, where he had impressed as a starter. Steuckers became a pivotal player during his season at MVV, featuring in almost every match and showcasing his skills with eight goals and ten assists.

=== KRC Genk ===
On 9 June 2024, Steuckers returned to KRC Genk after seven years, signing a four-year deal.

== Career statistics ==
As of match played 19 May 2026

Appearances and goals by club, season and competition
Club	Season	League			National cup (Note: Includes Belgian Cup and KNVB Cup)		Europe		Other		Total	
Club	Season	Division	Apps	Goals	Apps	Goals	Apps	Goals	Apps	Goals	Apps	Goals
Sint-Truiden	2020–21	Belgian Pro League	6	0	1	0	—		—		7	0
Sint-Truiden	2023–24	Belgian Pro League	35	6	2	1	—		—		37	7
Sint-Truiden	Total		41	6	3	1	—		—		44	7
MVV (loan)	2022–23	Eerste Divisie	36	9	1	0	—		2 (Note: Appearances in Eredivisie promotion/relegation playoffs)	0	39	9
Genk	2024–25	Belgian Pro League	37	8	4	0	—		—		41	8
Genk	2025–26	Belgian Pro League	28	0	1	0	10 (Note: Appearances in UEFA Europa League)	0	—		39	0
Genk	Total		65	8	5	0	10	0	—		80	8
Career total			141	23	9	1	10	0	2	0	163	24
