= Ibrahima Sory Bangoura (footballer, born 2004) =

Guinea association football player

Personal information
- Date of birth: 5 January 2004 (age 22)
- Place of birth: Conakry, Guinea
- Height: 1.90 m (6 ft 3 in)
- Position: Midfielder

Team information
- Current team: Genk
- Number: 21

Youth career
- 2014–2021: Johnson Académie Sport

Senior career*
Years	Team	Apps	(Gls)
2022–2024	Jong Genk	47	(2)
2024–	Genk	66	(0)

International career^{‡}
2026–	Guinea	1	(0)
- * Club domestic league appearances and goals as of 18:02, 25 October 2026 (UTC) ‡ National team caps and goals as of 19:00, 4 June 2026 (UTC)

Ibrahima Sory Bangoura (born 5 January 2004) is a Guinean professional footballer who plays for Genk and the Guinea national team.

== Club career ==
In May 2022, Bangoura signed a four-your deal with Genk. He made his league debut on 24 April 2024 against Union Saint-Gilloise.

== International career ==
Bangoura was called up to the senior Guinea national team for friendlies in June 2026.

== Career statistics ==
=== Club ===
As of match played 25 October 2026

Appearances and goals by club, season and competition
Club	Season	League			Cup		Europe		Other		Total	
Club	Season	Division	Apps	Goals	Apps	Goals	Apps	Goals	Apps	Goals	Apps	Goals
Jong Genk	2022–23	Challenger Pro League	22	0	—		—		—		22	0
Jong Genk	2023–24	Challenger Pro League	25	2	—		—		—		25	2
Jong Genk	Total		47	2	—		—		—		47	2
Genk	2023–24	Belgian Pro League	3	0	0	0	0	0	—		3	0
Genk	2024–25	Belgian Pro League	31	0	4	0	—		—		35	0
Genk	2025–26	Belgian Pro League	26	0	0	0	10 (Note: Appearances in UEFA Europa League)	0	—		36	0
Genk	2026–27	Belgian Pro League	7	0	0	0	—		—		7	0
Genk	Total		66	0	4	0	10	0	0	0	81	0
Career total			114	2	4	0	10	0	0	0	127	2

=== International ===
As of match played 4 June 2026

Appearances and goals by national team and year
National team	Year	Apps	Goals
Gambia	2026	1	0
Total		1	0
