= Adrián Palacios =

Venezuelan footballer

Personal information
- Full name: Adrián José Palacios Hernández
- Date of birth: 7 June 2004 (age 22)
- Place of birth: El Vigía, Venezuela
- Height: 1.87 m (6 ft 2 in)
- Position: Centre-back

Team information
- Current team: Genk
- Number: 34

Youth career
- 2010–2018: Atlético Parque Chama
- 2018–2020: Real Vigía FC
- 2020–2021: Titanes

Senior career*
Years	Team	Apps	(Gls)
2021–2022	Titanes	2	(2)
2022–2024	Deportivo Cali	13	(0)
2024–2025	Jong Genk	15	(0)
2025–	Genk	11	(0)

International career^{‡}
2022	Venezuela U20	2	(0)
- * Club domestic league appearances and goals as of 18:00, 25 January 2026 (UTC) ‡ National team caps and goals as of 22:00, 16 November 2025 (UTC)

Adrián José Palacios Hernández (born 4 June 2004) is a Venezuelan professional footballer who plays as a centre-back for the Belgian Pro League club Genk.

== Club career ==
Palacios is a product of the academies of the Venezuelan clubs Atlético Parque Chama, Real Vigía FC and Titanes. He began his senior career with Titanes in the Venezuelan Segunda División in 2021 when they won the tournament. On 12 July 2022, he transferred to the Colombian Categoría Primera B club Deportivo Cali. On 21 June 2024, he joined the Belgian club Genk on a 4-year contract.

== International career ==
Palacios played for the Venezuela U15s in the 2019 South American U-15 Championship. In November 2025, he was called up to the senior Venezuela national team for a set of friendlies.

== Career statistics ==
=== Club ===
As of match played 25 January 2026

Appearances and goals by club, season and competition
Club	Season	League			National cup		Continental		Other		Total	
Club	Season	Division	Apps	Goals	Apps	Goals	Apps	Goals	Apps	Goals	Apps	Goals
Titanes	2021	Liga FUTVE 2	1	0	—		—		—		1	0
Titanes	2022	Liga FUTVE 2	1	0	—		—		—		1	0
Titanes	Total		2	0	—		—		—		2	0
Deportivo Cali	2022	Categoría Primera A	5	0	—		—		—		5	0
Deportivo Cali	2024	Categoría Primera A	7	0	—		—		—		7	0
Deportivo Cali	Total		12	0	—		—		—		12	0
Jong Genk	2024–25	Challenger Pro League	15	0	—		—		—		15	0
Genk	2024–25	Belgian Pro League	1	0	1	0	—		—		2	0
Genk	2025–26	Belgian Pro League	10	0	2	0	2 (Note: Appearances in UEFA Europa League)	0	—		14	0
Genk	Total		11	0	3	0	2	0	—		16	0
Career total			40	0	3	0	2	0	0	0	45	0

== Honours ==
Titanes

- Liga FUTVE 2: 2021
