= Matte Smets =

Belgian footballer (born 2004)

Personal information
- Date of birth: 4 January 2004 (age 22)
- Place of birth: Bilzen, Belgium
- Height: 1.84 m (6 ft 0 in)
- Positions: Centre-back; defensive midfielder

Team information
- Current team: Genk
- Number: 6

Youth career
- 2009–2010: Bilzerse VV
- 2010–2018: Genk
- 2018–2022: Sint-Truiden

Senior career*
Years	Team	Apps	(Gls)
2022–2024	Sint-Truiden	54	(0)
2024–	Genk	85	(0)

International career^{‡}
2023	Belgium U20	2	(0)
2024–	Belgium U21	11	(1)
2024–	Belgium	1	(0)
- * Club domestic league appearances and goals as of 25 October 2026 ‡ National team caps and goals as of 15:33, 18 November 2026 (UTC)

Matte Smets (born 4 January 2004) is a Belgian professional footballer who plays as a centre-back for Belgian Pro League club Genk and the Belgium national team.

== Club career ==
Smets began playing football with Bilzerse, where his father was a former player. He shortly after moved to Genk in 2010 where he stayed for 8 years. In 2018, he moved to the youth academy of Sint-Truiden where he finished his development. On 27 May 2022, he signed his first professional contract with the club. He made his senior and professional debut with Sint-Truiden as a substitute in a 2–0 Belgian First Division A loss to Royal Antwerp on 7 October 2022.

Originally a defensive midfielder, Smets was developed into a centre-back in the middle of a three-man defense. On 6 July 2023, he extended his contract with Sint-Truiden until 2026.

After finishing an impressive ninth in the 2023-24 Belgian Pro League season under coach Thorsten Fink, coming close to qualifying for the title play-offs, Smets returned to Racing Genk, following Fink's move there.

The same transfer window had seen interest from Gent and Watford.

== International career ==
Smets is a youth international for Belgium, having played for the Belgium U20s in November 2023.

Smets scored on his debut for the Belgium U21s, opening the scoring in a 2–2 draw with Morocco U23s on 4 June 2024.

In October 2024 he was named in the senior Belgium squad for the 2024–25 UEFA Nations League matches against Italy and France on 10 and 14 October 2024 respectively, remaining on the bench for both games.

He made his debut on 17 November 2024 in a Nations League game against Israel at the Bozsik Aréna in Hungary. He substituted Zeno Debast at half-time, as Israel won 1–0.

== Career statistics ==
=== Club ===
As of match played 25 October 2026

Appearances and goals by club, season and competition
Club	Season	League			National cup		Europe		Other		Total	
Club	Season	Division	Apps	Goals	Apps	Goals	Apps	Goals	Apps	Goals	Apps	Goals
Sint-Truidense	2022–23	Belgian Pro League	14	0	2	0	—		—		16	0
Sint-Truidense	2023–24	Belgian Pro League	40	0	2	0	—		—		42	0
Sint-Truidense	Total		54	0	4	0	—		—		58	0
Genk	2024–25	Belgian Pro League	38	0	4	0	—		0	0	42	0
Genk	2025–26	Belgian Pro League	39	0	2	0	13 (Note: Appearances in UEFA Europa League)	1	—		54	1
Genk	2026–27	Belgian Pro League	8	0	1	0	—		—		9	0
Genk	Total		85	0	7	0	13	1	0	0	105	1
Career total			139	0	11	0	13	1	0	0	163	1

=== International ===
As of match played 17 November 2024

Appearances and goals by national team and year
National team	Year	Apps	Goals
Belgium	2024	1	0
Total		1	0
