= Noah Adedeji-Sternberg =

Belgian footballer

Personal information
- Full name: Noah Adedeji-Sternberg
- Date of birth: 19 June 2005 (age 21)
- Place of birth: Germany
- Height: 1.82 m (6 ft 0 in)
- Position: Winger

Team information
- Current team: Genk
- Number: 32

Youth career
- Royal Antwerp
- Excelsior Mouscron
- –2019: Rot-Weiß Oberhausen
- 2019–2023: Borussia Mönchengladbach

Senior career*
Years	Team	Apps	(Gls)
2023–2026	Jong Genk	27	(5)
2024–	Genk	69	(5)

International career^{‡}
2022	Belgium U17	2	(0)
2023	Belgium U19	2	(0)
2025–	Belgium U21	6	(1)
- * Club domestic league appearances and goals as of 25 October 2026 ‡ National team caps and goals as of 08:31, 31 March 2026 (UTC)

Noah Adedeji-Sternberg is a professional footballer who plays as a winger for Belgian Pro League club K.R.C. Genk. Born in Germany, he plays for the Belgium national under-21 football team.

== Youth career ==
Adedeji-Sternberg was born in Germany on 19 June 2005 to a Nigerian father and German mother. He moved to Belgium and began playing for Royal Antwerp as a youth player. He then moved to fellow Belgian club Excelsior Mouscron, and then German club Rot-Weiß Oberhausen, before moving to Bundesliga club Borussia Mönchengladbach in 2019. Adedeji-Sternberg played for Borussia Monchengladbach until 2023 when he moved back to Belgium with Genk, signing a contract until 2027.

== Club career ==
=== Genk ===
Adedeji-Sternberg began the season with the club's reserve team, playing for the club in the Challenger Pro League, making his debut in a 5–2 win over Francs Borains, coming on as a substitute. Adedeji-Sternberg scored his first professional goal in a 3–2 loss to RFC Liège in the 89th minute. He went on to make a total of 24 appearances in the league that season, scoring 5 goals.

During that season he also made his debut for the first team, playing in his first match in a 3–1 win over RWD Molenbeek. He made 2 further league appearances, as well as 2 more appearances during the championship play-offs.

Adedeji–Sternberg scored his first goal for the first team in a 2–0 away league win versus Anderlecht.

== International career ==
Adedeji-Sternberg is eligible to represent Germany, Nigeria, as well as Belgium, who he represents at U19 level. He made his first appearance for the team in a 5–1 loss to Netherlands.

== Career statistics ==
=== Club ===
As of match played 25 October 2026

Appearances and goals by club, season and competition
Club	Season	League			National cup		Continental		Other		Total	
Club	Season	Division	Apps	Goals	Apps	Goals	Apps	Goals	Apps	Goals	Apps	Goals
Jong Genk	2023–24	Challenger Pro League	24	5	—		—		—		24	5
Jong Genk	2024–25	Challenger Pro League	3	0	—		—		—		3	0
Jong Genk	Total		27	5	—		—		—		27	5
Genk	2023–24	Belgian Pro League	5	0	0	0	—		—		5	0
Genk	2024–25	Belgian Pro League	33	4	4	1	—		—		37	5
Genk	2025–26	Belgian Pro League	25	1	2	0	9 (Note: Appearances in UEFA Europa League)	0	—		36	1
Genk	2026–27	Belgian Pro League	6	0	1	0	—		—		7	0
Genk	Total		69	5	7	1	9	0	0	0	85	6
Career total			96	10	7	1	9	0	0	0	112	11
