= Zakaria El Ouahdi =

Morocco international footballer (born 2001)

Zakaria El Ouahdi زكرياء الواحدي
- El Ouahdi with Morocco in 2026

Personal information
- Date of birth: 31 December 2001 (age 24)
- Place of birth: Hoboken, Belgium
- Height: 1.75 m (5 ft 9 in)
- Positions: Right winger; right-back

Team information
- Current team: Hamburger SV
- Number: 7

Youth career
- 2011–2013: Beerschot VAC
- 2013–2018: Zulte Waregem
- 2018–2019: Manchester IFA
- 2019–2020: Berchem Sport

Senior career*
Years	Team	Apps	(Gls)
2020–2021	Rupel Boom	1	(0)
2021–2023	RWDM Brussels	51	(8)
2023–2026	Genk	98	(14)
2026–	Hamburger SV	6	(0)

International career^{‡}
2023–2024	Morocco U23	20	(3)
2025–	Morocco	6	(0)
Medal record
Men's football
Representing Morocco
U-23 Africa Cup of Nations
Winner	2023 Morocco
Olympic Games
Bronze medal – third place	2024 Paris	Team
- * Club domestic league appearances and goals as of 1 November 2026 ‡ National team caps and goals as of 5 October 2026

Zakaria El Ouahdi (Moroccan Arabic: زكرياء الواحدي; born 31 December 2001), is a professional footballer who plays as a right winger or a right-back for Bundesliga club Hamburger SV. Born in Belgium, he plays for the Morocco national team.

== Early life ==
El Ouahdi was born in Hoboken in the Antwerp Province in a family of eight children. His parents are of Moroccan descent.

== Club career ==
In June 2021, El Ouadhi joined the under-21 side of RWD Molenbeek. After good performances, El Ouadhi was regularly invited to train with the first team, and was awarded his first professional contract on 9 September 2021.

On 14 August 2021, he made his professional debut in Challenger Pro League in RWD Molenbeek's 3–1 victory against Royal Excel Mouscron. On 3 October, he scored his first goal in professional, awarding a 2–1 win for his club against Deinze.

On 12 March 2023, El Ouadhi scored his first career hattrick against Club NXT, offering an important 3–2 win for RWD Molenbeek for their fight for promotion. He terminated the 2022–23 season by winning the league with RWD Molenbeek and gained a promotion to the Jupiler Pro League. El Ouadhi named was as Molenbeek's player of the season and figured in the league's best XI of the season.

On 5 September 2023, El Ouahdi signed for Genk on an initial three-year deal with the option for a further twelve months.

On 1 September 2026, El Ouahdi joined Bundesliga side Hamburger SV.

== International career ==
Holding both Belgian and Moroccan citizenship, El Ouadhi chose to represent Morocco in international level. On 9 June 2023, he was called up by coach Issame Charaï in Morocco U-23 squad for the 2023 U-23 Africa Cup of Nations. El Ouadhi appeared in four out of five matches during the tournament, and scored one goal against Mali U-23 in the semi-final match. Morocco U-23 won the tournament as El Ouadhi figured in the competition's team of the tournament as the best right-back.

El Ouadhi earned his first senior call-up for 2025 Africa Cup of Nations qualifiers against Gabon and Lesotho in September 2024, but remained on the bench for both games.

On 26 May 2026, El Ouadhi was selected in the 26-man squad for the 2026 FIFA World Cup.

== Career statistics ==
=== Club ===
As of match played 1 November 2026

Appearances and goals by club, season and competition
Club	Season	League			Belgian Cup		Europe		Other		Total	
Club	Season	Division	Apps	Goals	Apps	Goals	Apps	Goals	Apps	Goals	Apps	Goals
Rupel Boom	2020–21	Belgian National Division 1	1	0	1	0	—		—		2	0
RWDM Brussels	2021–22	Challenger Pro League	21	1	1	0	—		2 (Note: Appearances in Challenger Pro League promotion play-offs)	0	24	1
RWDM Brussels	2022–23	Challenger Pro League	25	7	2	0	—		—		27	7
RWDM Brussels	2023–24	Belgian Pro League	5	0	0	0	—		—		5	0
RWDM Brussels	Total		51	8	3	0	—		2	0	56	8
Genk	2023–24	Belgian Pro League	24	0	2	0	1 (Note: Appearance in UEFA Conference League)	0	—		27	0
Genk	2024–25	Belgian Pro League	36	6	4	2	—		—		40	8
Genk	2025–26	Belgian Pro League	34	8	1	0	10 (Note: Appearances in UEFA Europa League)	4	—		45	12
Genk	2026–27	Belgian Pro League	4	0	0	0	—		—		4	0
Genk	Total		98	14	7	2	11	4	—		116	20
Hamburger SV	2026–27	Bundesliga	6	0	1	0	—		—		7	0
Career total			156	22	12	2	11	4	2	0	181	28

=== International ===
As of match played 4 October 2026

Appearances and goals by national team and year
National team	Year	Apps	Goals
Morocco	2025	1	0
Morocco	2026	5	0
Total		6	0

== Honours ==
RWD Molenbeek

- Challenger Pro League: 2022–23

Morocco U23

- U-23 Africa Cup of Nations: 2023
- Olympic Bronze Medal: 2024

Individual

- Challenger Pro League Best XI: 2022–23
- U-23 Africa Cup of Nations Team of the Tournament: 2023
- Belgian Lion Award: 2025
- Ebony Shoe: 2026
