= Jeppe Erenbjerg =

Danish footballer (born 2000)

Personal information
- Full name: Jeppe Lyngvold Erenbjerg
- Date of birth: 29 April 2000 (age 26)
- Place of birth: Copenhagen, Denmark
- Height: 1.84 m (6 ft 0 in)
- Positions: Midfielder; winger; forward

Team information
- Current team: Genk
- Number: 11

Youth career
- –2019: B.93

Senior career*
Years	Team	Apps	(Gls)
2017–2024	B.93	154	(45)
2024–2026	Zulte Waregem	57	(16)
2026–	Genk	9	(0)
- * Club domestic league appearances and goals as of 25 October 2026

Jeppe Lyngvold Erenbjerg (born 29 April 2000) is a Danish professional footballer who plays as a midfielder, winger, or forward for Belgian Pro League club Genk.

== Career ==
As a youth player, Erenbjerg joined the youth academy of Danish side B.93 and was promoted to the club's senior team in 2017, where he made 154 league appearances and scored forty-five goals and helped them achieve promotion from the third tier to the second tier.

Ahead of the 2024–25 season, he signed for Belgian side Zulte Waregem, helping the club achieve promotion from the second tier to the top flight. Belgian newspaper wrote in 2025 that he "was one of the absolute stars at Essevee during the 2024–25 season, although he had to deal with a minor injury" while playing for the club.

On 11 June 2026, Erenbjerg moved to Genk with a four-season contract.

== Personal life ==
Erenbjerg was born on 29 April 2000 in Denmark. While playing football, he has been in a relationship with Danish female footballer Josefine Funch.

== Career statistics ==
As of match played 25 October 2026

Appearances and goals by club, season and competition
Club	Season	League			Belgian Cup		Europe		Total	
Club	Season	Division	Apps	Goals	Apps	Goals	Apps	Goals	Apps	Goals
B.93	2017–18	Danish 2nd Division	1	0	—		—		1	0
B.93	2018–19	Danish 2nd Division	14	5	—		—		14	5
B.93	2019–20	Danish 2nd Division	19	2	—		—		19	2
B.93	2020–21	Danish 2nd Division	26	9	5	1	—		31	10
B.93	2021–22	Danish 2nd Division	32	12	2	0	—		34	12
B.93	2022–23	Danish 2nd Division	30	9	1	0	—		31	9
B.93	2023–24	Danish 1st Division	32	8	3	6	—		35	14
B.93	Total		154	45	11	7	—		165	52
Zulte Waregem	2024–25	Challenger Pro League	27	6	3	0	—		30	6
Zulte Waregem	2025–26	Belgian Pro League	35	13	0	0	—		35	13
Zulte Waregem	Total		62	19	3	0	—		65	19
Genk	2026–27	Belgian Pro League	9	0	1	0	—		10	0
Career total			225	64	15	7	0	0	240	71

== Honours ==
Zulte Waregem

- Challenger Pro League: 2024–25
