= Cegeka Arena =

Football stadium in Genk, Belgium

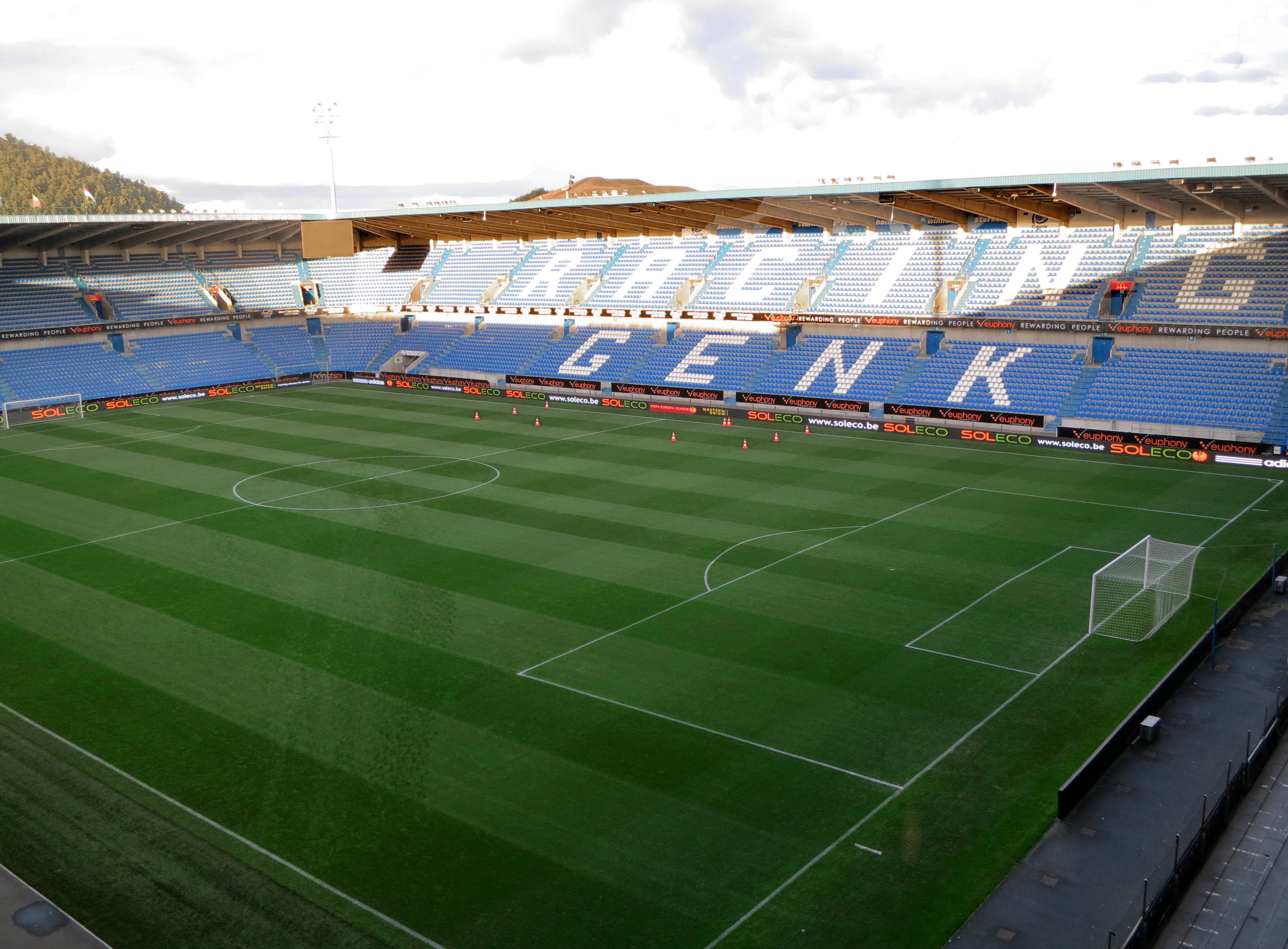
- UEFA Category 4 Stadium
- Interactive map of Cegeka Arena
- Former names: Thyl Gheyselinckstadion (1990–1999); Fenixstadion (1999–2007); Cristal Arena (2007–2016); Luminus Arena (2016–2021)
- Location: Genk, Belgium
- Coordinates: 51°00′18″N 5°32′00″E
- Capacity: 23,718; 20,040 (UEFA matches)
- Field size: 105 x 68 m

Construction
- Opened: 1990

Tenant
- KRC Genk

The Cegeka Arena is a multi-purpose stadium in Genk, Belgium. It is currently used mostly for association football matches and is the home ground of KRC Genk. The stadium holds 23,718 (of which 4,200 are standing places) and was built in 1999. Heusden-Zolder played at this stadium for their single season at the top level in 2003–04. Following the relegation of the club, it moved to Mijnstadion in Beringen. The average home attendance varies from 20,000 to 22,000 supporters who visit the stadium every fortnight.

== History ==
Before the start of the 2007–08 season, the stadium was known as "het Fenixstadion". However, early 2007 Racing Genk signed an agreement with the Alken-Maes brewery to lease the name of the stadium for a 5-year period changing the name to Cristal Arena. In 2016, the name was changed to Luminus Arena, named after Belgian company Luminus, the new stadium sponsor, who signed a four-year deal for the naming rights. In 2021, the name was changed to CegekA Arena, named after the Belgian IT company, the new stadium sponsor, who signed a ten-year deal for the naming rights.

The Belgium national football team played three games at this venue in 2009, a friendly against Slovenia, a 2010 FIFA World Cup qualifier against Bosnia and Herzegovina, which they lost 2–4 and a Nations League promotion/relegation play-off against Ukraine, which they won 3-0.

On 20 November 2018, Italy played a friendly against the United States, and won by a 94-minute goal from Matteo Politano.
