= KRC Genk =

Association football club in Belgium

- Full name: Koninklijke Racing Club Genk (Royal Racing Club Genk)
- Nicknames: Blauw-Wit (Blue-White), Racing, KRC, De Smurfen (The Smurfs)
- Founded: 1988; 38 years ago, merge of Thor Waterschei with KFC Winterslag
- Ground: Cegeka Arena
- Capacity: 23,718; 21,500 (UEFA matches)
- Chairman: Peter Croonen
- Head coach: Timmy Simons
- League: Belgian Pro League
- 2025–26: Belgian Pro League, 7th of 16
- Website: krcgenk.be
Home colours	Away colours	Third colours

Koninklijke Racing Club Genk (Dutch pronunciation: [ˈkoːnɪŋkləkə ˈreːsɪŋ ˌklʏp ˈxɛŋk]), (Note: Genk in isolation: [ɣɛŋk].) commonly known as KRC Genk or Racing Genk, is a Belgian professional football club based in the city of Genk in Belgian Limburg. Racing Genk plays in the Belgian Pro League and have won four championship titles; in 1998–99, in 2001–02, in 2010–11 and in 2018–19. They have also won five Belgian Cups, most recently in 2020–21. They qualified for the UEFA Champions League group stage in the 2002–03, 2011–12 and 2019–20.

The club formed in 1988 by the merger of Waterschei Thor with KFC Winterslag, from which it took over the matricule number. It has been one of the most successful clubs in Belgium since the late 1990s and so they regularly qualify for European competitions. The club has been playing in the first division since the 1996–97 season. They play their home matches in the Cegeka Arena. Their main outfit is blue and white.

== History ==
=== KFC Winterslag history (1923–1988) ===
The club FC Winterslag was founded in 1923 and that gave it the matricule number 322. On its 35th anniversary the club added the Royal prefix Koninklijke to their name to become KFC Winterslag. In 1972–73 Winterslag reached the second division and they eventually qualified for the 1974–75 Belgian First Division after finishing second in the second division final round. They had taken advantage of the increase in the number of first division clubs (from 16 to 20). The club ended the season in last place but won the second division right after.

KFC Winterslag reached the 5th place in 1981 which allowed them to play UEFA Cup matches, where it defeated Bryne FK from Norway and English Premier league giant Arsenal. In the next round it was knocked out by Dundee United from Scotland. Two seasons later it was relegated to the second stage after a disappointing last place. That season Standard Liège won the championship on bribery in a match against the club of Waterschei Thor that would eventually merge with the matricule number 322. Following a spell of four seasons in the second division, Winterslag found its place again in the first division by winning the 1987 final round, one point ahead of Tongeren. It finished 15th on 18 but at the end of the season, the club merged with the neighbour club of Waterschei Thor which was playing in the second division since its relegation in 1986.

=== K Waterschei SV Thor Genk ===
K Waterschei SV Thor was created in 1919 as Waterschei's Sport Vereeniging Thor with Thor being the acronym of Tot Herstel Onzer Rechten (English: To recover our rights). It received matricule number n°533. The club enjoyed a spell in the first division in the late 1950s to the early 1960s and again from 1978 to 1986.

During the 1982–83 season, the match between Standard Liège and Waterschei had been fixed and Standard eventually won the championship. Waterschei won the Belgian Cup twice (1980 and 1982). The latter victory led to them reaching the semi-finals of the European Cup Winners Cup in the 1982–83 season. After defeating PSG in the quarter-finals, Waterschei lost the first leg of the semi-final 5–1 at Pittodrie Stadium, home of the eventual winners, Aberdeen. A 1–0 victory in Waterschei, courtesy of Eddy Voordeckers, could not reverse the position.

After two seasons in the second division, K. Waterschei SV Thor Genk merged with KFC Winterslag in 1988 to form the current KRC Genk.

=== KRC Genk (1988–present) ===
1990s and 2000s

The new club was named KRC Genk and as it kept the Winterslag ranking, it began in the first division but finished last. The next year Genk won the final round in 2nd division and then played 4 seasons in the first division. In 1995 the club hired Aimé Anthuenis a coach and Racing finished second and skipped the final round as two first division teams merged (Seraing and Standard Liège). After an eighth place in 1997, the club had a good 1997–98 season with a cup win and a second place in the championship. In its first European season, Racing Genk eliminated successively Apolonia Fier and MSV Duisburg but it lost to Mallorca in the round of 16 after two draws (1–1 on aggregate) in the last Cup Winners' Cup. The season was ended well as Genk won its first Belgian championship in May, with manager Aimé Anthuenis then moving to Anderlecht.

Genk played in the UEFA Champions League in 1999–2000 but lost in the second qualifying round to Maribor. The season was salvaged by winning the Belgian Cup again, this time to Standard, but Genk ended the championship in 9th place. It finished 11th in the following season and lost in the UEFA Cup second round to Werder Bremen after a win against FC Zürich. After this poor spell, Genk won the championship once more in the 2001–02 season. In 2002–03, they reached the Champions League group stages for the first time in their history. Although they came 4th, they impressed fans with draws against Real Madrid, Roma and AEK Athens.

In the 2006–07 season, Genk finished second to Anderlecht. The Limburgians had been ahead almost the entire season but were pipped at the post by Anderlecht after losing at Germinal Beerschot. The 2007–08 season was a disaster, as Genk failed to finish in the top half of the division, ending in a disappointing tenth place.

Three bad seasons followed. Genk finished the 2007–08 season on 45 points and in 10th spot in the league: their worst result in seven years. The 2008–09 season was poor for Genk as well, finishing 8th in the league. The season ended on a positive note with them winning the Belgian Cup, which gave them a ticket to the fourth Europa League qualifying round. The 2009–10 season started badly when they were knocked out of the Europa League by Lille. Things did not go well in the domestic league either. Manager Hein Vanhaezebrouck was fired in December and was replaced by Franky Vercauteren. Genk finished 11th, but Vercauteren led the club to European football by beating derby rival Sint-Truiden in the final of Play-offs II.

2010s

The 2010–11 season started well for KRC Genk when they beat Inter Turku with 1–5 in Finland. They progressed to the 4th qualifying round of the Europa League and drew the Portuguese club Porto. Genk lost both games against Porto, despite two good performances.

On 30 January 2010, KRC Genk announced that coach Franky Vercauteren signed a new contract that ran untl June 2013.

They only lost their first game of the season on the 20th matchday and started the Play-offs in second place. The club won the 2010–11 Belgian Pro League after drawing 1–1 with title challengers Standard Liége. This was KRC Genk's third league win in its history and its supporters celebrated with a pitch invasion straight after the final whistle.

On 11 August, coach Frank Vercauteren confirmed he was leaving Genk and signed with United Arab Emirate club Al-Jazira. In the 3rd Qualifying Round of the 2011–12 UEFA Champions League KRC Genk beat FK Partizan over two legs and drew Maccabi Haifa in the play-off Round. Maccabi Haifa beat Genk 2–1 in the first leg in Israel, while the second leg was won by Genk with the same 2–1 score in Belgium. During the penalty shoot-out, goalkeeper László Köteles helped Genk to qualify by saving two penalties. For the second time in its history, KRC Genk reached the group stages of the UEFA Champions League. They were drawn in Group E with Chelsea, Valencia and Bayer Leverkusen.

In late August 2011, Mario Been was announced as the new manager. The Champions League campaign was one with ups and downs. Genk got a 1–1 result against both Chelsea and Bayer Leverkusen and a goalless draw against Valencia. Away from home, Genk lost all three games. The season in the Jupiler League was a difficult one, with Genk only just qualifying for the play-offs by finishing sixth in the regular competition. In the play-offs however, Genk started to play better and climbed up to third place. By finishing in third place, KRC Genk qualified for the third qualifying round of the Europa League.

The 2012–13 season started well for Genk by qualifying for the Europa League group stage after beating Aktobe and FC Luzern. In this group stage KRC Genk performed very well and ultimately won the group without a single defeat. Genk finished first with three points more than Basel and by doing so, qualified for the next round where they faced VfB Stuttgart. It was the first time in the club's history that they played European football after the winter break. Stuttgart got the better of Genk over the two games. In the league, Genk qualified for the play-offs and performed well until the title was out of reach; fifth place was the result. Genk ended their season on a positive note by winning the Belgian Cup. They defeated Cercle Brugge in the final, in front of 30,000 Genk fans.

In the 2016–2017 season, Genk participated in the UEFA Europa League; they started playing in the second qualifying round and qualified for the third qualifying round (on 21 July 2016) and the play-off round (on 4 August 2016). They won their group with 3 home victories over Athletic Bilbao, Rapid Wien and Sassuolo and after defeating Astra Giurgiu (2–2 and 1–0) in the 2nd round they drew KAA Gent from the domestic Belgian Pro League with 2 confusing games Gent-Genk, Genk-Gent and an impressive 2–5 away victory. Even when Genk got beaten in the quarter final against Celta de Vigo (3–2 and 1–1), it was Genk's most successful European season.

Genk won the 2018–19 Belgian First Division A for the fourth time in their history, hence they qualified for the 2019–20 UEFA Champions League after an eight-year absence.

Genk started their 2019–20 UEFA Champions League campaign with a poor 6–2 loss against Austrian club Red Bull Salzburg. In the second match they drew 0–0 against Napoli, and in the third match they lost 1–4 against Liverpool.

== Stadium ==
Prior to the merger of the clubs in 1988, KFC Winterslag played at De Noordlaan, whilst Thor Waterschei played at the Andre Dumont Stadium. The Andre Dumont Stadium was renovated at significant cost following the merger and became known as the Thyl Geyselinckstadion after Thyl Geyselinck, who oversaw the merger of the clubs, and it was where KRC Genk played their matches from 1990. De Noordlaan was then used as a ground for the reserve and youth teams of KRC Genk before falling into disrepair around the year 2000 and being demolished in 2004 to make way for housing. The Thyl Geyselinckstadion was redeveloped in 1999 to hold 24,500 spectators and was renamed to the Fenixstadion. Following a sponsorship deal with IT company Cegeka in 2021, the stadium was renamed to Cegeka Arena, having previously been known as the Luminus Arena due to a similar sponsorship deal with Luminus.

== Youth academy ==
Genk is well known for its outstanding youth academy. In 2003 they built their youth center next to their stadium and set up a youth program with Ronny Vangeneugden. There are further plans to build a boarding school and some synthetic pitches. In the past and now, many young players have found their way through the youth system. Some examples are Yannick Carrasco, Jelle Vossen, Dennis Praet, Steven Defour, Christian Benteke, Thibaut Courtois, Divock Origi, Timothy Castagne, Leandro Trossard and Kevin De Bruyne.

Their scouting is also highly regarded. Players such as Kalidou Koulibaly, Wilfred Ndidi, Leon Bailey, Sergej Milinković-Savić, Daniel Muñoz and Sander Berge all played for Genk.

== Honours ==
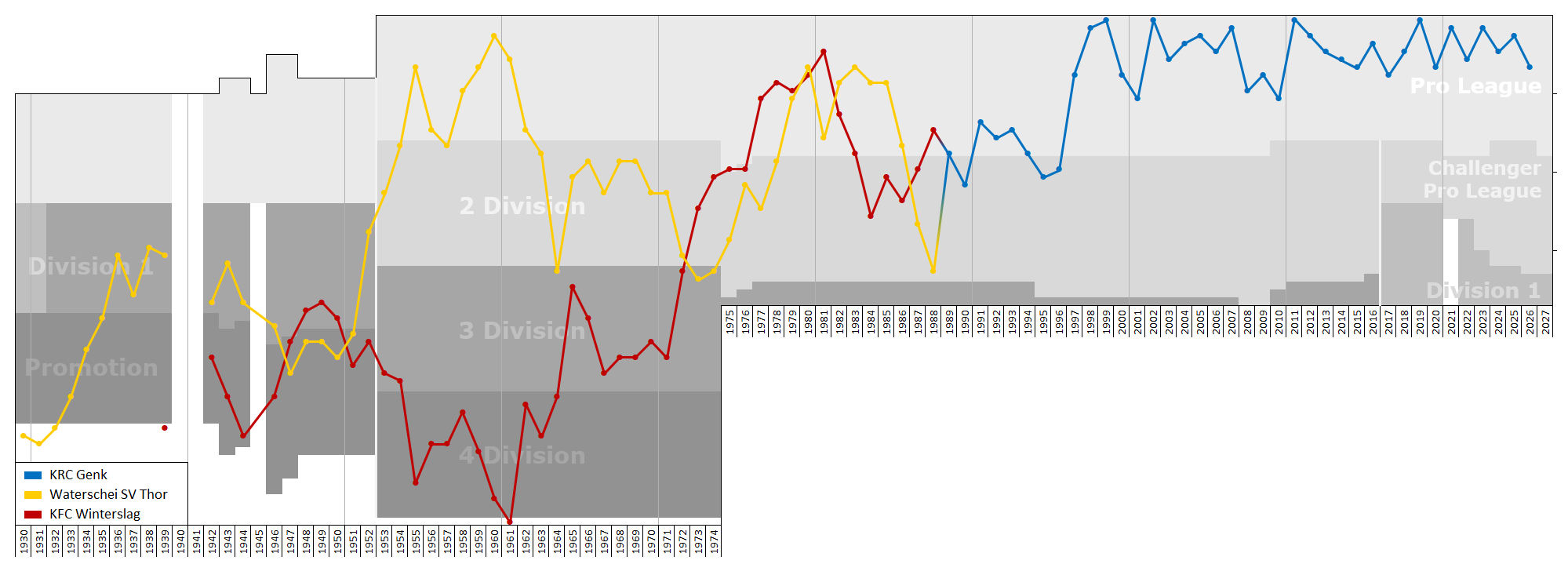
Historical league performance chart of KRC Genk and its predecessors

- Belgian First Division:
  - Winners (4): 1998–99, 2001–02, 2010–11, 2018–19
  - Runners-up (4): 1997–98, 2006–07, 2020–21, 2022–23
- Belgian Cup:
  - Winners (5): 1997–98, 1999–2000, 2008–09, 2012–13, 2020–21
  - Runners-up (1): 2017–18
- Belgian Super Cup
  - Winners (2): 2011, 2019
  - Runners-up (7): 1998, 1999, 2000, 2002, 2009, 2013, 2021
- Belgian Second Division: (as KFC Winterslag before 1988)
  - Winners (1): 1975–76
  - Runners-up (2): 1986–87, 1995–96
- Belgian Second Division final round:
  - Winners (2): 1987, 1990
  - Runners-up (1): 1974

== European record ==
=== UEFA club competition record ===
Updated 31 August 2018.

Tournament	Pld	W	D	L	GF	GA	GD	Win%
Champions League / European Cup	22	5	8	9	20	41	−21	22.73
Europa League / UEFA Cup	60	34	12	14	117	80	+37	56.67
Cup Winners' Cup	6	3	3	0	16	3	+13	50.00
UEFA Intertoto Cup	10	5	2	3	19	13	+6	50.00
Total	98	47	25	26	172	137	+35	47.96

=== Summary of best results ===
From the quarter-finals upwards:

UEFA Cup/UEFA Europa League:

- Quarter-finalists in 2016–17

UEFA Intertoto Cup:

- Semi-finalists in 2003–04

=== UEFA coefficient ===
Correct as of 21 May 2025.

Rank	Team	Points
139	(Switzerland) Servette FC	11.500
140	(Estonia) FC Flora	11.500
141	(Belgium) KRC Genk	11.370
142	(Belgium) Standard Liège	11.370
143	(Belgium) Royal Charleroi S.C.	11.370

== Players ==
=== Current squad ===
As of 5 September 2026

Note: Flags indicate national team as defined under FIFA eligibility rules; some limited exceptions apply. Players may hold more than one non-FIFA nationality.

No.	Pos.	Nation	Player
1	GK	BEL	Tobe Leysen
4	MF	BIH	Benjamin Tahirović (on loan from Brøndby)
5	DF	BEL	Christiaan Ravych
6	DF	BEL	Matte Smets
8	MF	BEL	Bryan Heynen (captain)
10	FW	JPN	Junya Itō
11	MF	DEN	Jeppe Erenbjerg
17	FW	NGR	Rafiu Durosinmi
18	DF	COD	Joris Kayembe
19	DF	ECU	Yaimar Medina
20	DF	URU	Kevin Amaro
21	MF	GUI	Ibrahima Sory Bangoura
23	FW	CMR	Aaron Bibout
24	MF	AUT	Nikolas Sattlberger
25	DF	MNE	Milan Roganović

No.	Pos.	Nation	Player
26	GK	AUT	Tobias Lawal
27	DF	BEL	Ken Nkuba
28	GK	BEL	Lucca Brughmans
30	FW	JPN	Ayumu Yokoyama
32	FW	BEL	Noah Adedeji-Sternberg
33	FW	GHA	Jerry Afriyie
34	DF	VEN	Adrián Palacios
38	MF	BEL	Daan Heymans
44	DF	BEL	Josue Kongolo
56	MF	BEL	August De Wannemacker
65	DF	NGR	Christian Akpan
73	DF	BEL	Elie Mbavu
84	DF	BEL	Emmanuel Sarfo
86	GK	BEL	Kenan Haroun
97	GK	MLI	Emile Doucouré

=== Out on loan ===
Note: Flags indicate national team as defined under FIFA eligibility rules; some limited exceptions apply. Players may hold more than one non-FIFA nationality.

No.	Pos.	Nation	Player
3	DF	ESP	Mujaid Sadick (at Rayo Vallecano until 30 June 2027)
7	FW	BEL	Jarne Steuckers (at VfL Bochum until 30 June 2027)
29	FW	BEL	Robin Mirisola (at Oud-Heverlee Leuven until 30 June 2027)
99	FW	SWE	Jusef Erabi (at Preston North End until 30 June 2027)

=== Jong Genk ===
As of 5 September 2026

Note: Flags indicate national team as defined under FIFA eligibility rules; some limited exceptions apply. Players may hold more than one non-FIFA nationality.

No.	Pos.	Nation	Player
2	DF	HAI	Kayden Pierre
22	DF	BEL	Brad Manguelle
50	MF	CIV	Moussa Koné
53	MF	BEL	Manu Mocsnik
54	DF	BEL	Sami El Morabet
55	DF	JPN	Yumeki Yoshinaga
57	FW	GAM	Mustapha Koma
58	FW	BEL	Prince N'Salambi
59	DF	BEL	Wout Kapers
60	FW	BEL	Saif Eddien Lazar
61	GK	BEL	Daan Van Laere
63	DF	BEL	Zion Henry
64	MF	BEL	Wout Willemsen
66	FW	BEL	Jonathan Coenen
67	FW	BEL	Ali Camara
68	MF	BEL	Lander Borgers

No.	Pos.	Nation	Player
70	FW	KAZ	Shakhmurat Dauletov
72	DF	NED	Alpha Barry
73	MF	BEL	Elie Mbavu
74	MF	BEL	Loïc Alvarez Fernandez
75	MF	BEL	Precious Ogbeiwi
76	MF	BEL	Jelle Driessen
78	FW	BEL	Kiyan Achahbar
79	FW	FIN	Djoully Nzoko
80	FW	COD	Elie Mpungu Kongolo
81	GK	BEL	Vic Debusschere
83	MF	BEL	Jens De Groof
85	MF	BEL	Rayan Garcia Belkacem
87	GK	BUL	Mariyan Boev
89	FW	KOR	Kim Myung-jun
90	FW	NGR	Victory Beniangba
98	DF	BEL	Tinus Moorthamer

=== Former players ===
Africa
DR Congo

- (Democratic Republic of the Congo) Neeskens Kebano

Gambia

- (The Gambia) Omar Colley

Guinea

- (Guinea) Souleymane Oulare

Ivory Coast

- (Ivory Coast) Didier Zokora

Nigeria

- (Nigeria) Wilfred Ndidi

Senegal

- (Senegal) Kalidou Koulibaly
- (Senegal) Kara Mbodj

South Africa

- (South Africa) Anele Ngcongca

Tanzania

- (Tanzania) Mbwana Samatta

Asia
Australia

- (Australia) Mathew Ryan
- (Australia) Danny Vukovic

Europe
Belgium

- (Belgium) Luc Nilis
- (Belgium) Denis Dasoul
- (Belgium) Christian Kabasele
- (Belgium) Jelle Vossen
- (Belgium) Branko Strupar
- (Belgium) Pieter Gerkens
- (Belgium) Timothy Castagne
- (Belgium) Sébastien Pocognoli
- (Belgium) Christian Benteke
- (Belgium) Steven Defour
- (Belgium) Leandro Trossard
- (Belgium) Kevin De Bruyne
- (Belgium) Thibaut Courtois
- (Belgium) Divock Origi
- (Belgium) Koen Casteels
- (Belgium) Thomas Buffel
- (Belgium) Wesley Sonck

Bosnia and Herzegovina

- (Bosnia and Herzegovina) Mirsad Bešlija
- (Bosnia and Herzegovina) Suvad Katana
- (Bosnia and Herzegovina) Ismet Mulavdić
- (Bosnia and Herzegovina) Bojan Nastić
- (Bosnia and Herzegovina) Tino-Sven Sušić

Denmark

- (Denmark) Joakim Mæhle

Finland

- (Finland) Jere Uronen

Indonesia

- (Indonesia) Sandy Henny Walsh

Israel

- (Israel) Elyaniv Barda

Malta

- (Malta) Carmel Busuttil

Netherlands

- (Suriname) Jean-Paul Boëtius

Norway

- (Norway) Sander Berge

Romania

- (Romania) Ianis Hagi
- (Romania) Vladimir Screciu

Serbia

- (Serbia) Sergej Milinković-Savić

Slovakia

- (Slovakia) Adam Nemec

Spain

- (Spain) Alejandro Pozuelo
- (Spain) Jose Naranjo

Turkey

- (Turkey) Sinan Bolat
- (Turkey) Enes Ünal

Ukraine

- (Ukraine) Ruslan Malinovskyi

North and Central America
Jamaica

- (Jamaica) Leon Bailey

== Club officials ==
As of 15 July 2026

Position	Staff
President	(Belgium) Mathieu Cilissen
Vice-President	(Belgium) Herman Nijs
Chief Executive Officer	(Belgium) Peter Croonen
Head of Football	(Belgium) Dimitri de Condé
Head of Business	(Belgium) Sem Franssen
Head of Community	(Belgium) Erik Gerits
Financial Director	(Belgium) Filip Aerden
General Director of Academy	(Belgium) Steven De Pauw
Stadium Director	(Belgium) Kobe Schepers
Chief Legal Officer	(Belgium) Pieter-Jan Desmit

== Technical Staff ==
As of 15 July 2026

Position	Staff
Head coach	(Belgium) Timmy Simons
Assistant coach	(Belgium) Domenico Olivieri (Belgium) Peter Balette
Goalkeeper coach	(Belgium) Steven Frederix (Belgium) Guy Martens
Fitness coach	(Belgium) Glenn Vanryckeghem
Video analyst	(Belgium) Tuur Ickmans
Sports Scientist	(Belgium) Arnaud Serruys
Club doctor	(Belgium) Philip Thys (Belgium) Jonas Massa
Physiotherapist	(Belgium) Matthias Didden (Netherlands) Martijn Smeets (Belgium) Erwin Kelchtermans
Performance Coach	(Netherlands) Cas van der Kraan
Nutritionist	(Belgium) Marlies Maenhoudt
Massage Therapist	(Belgium) Jurgen Schepers
Team Manager	(Belgium) Sylvio Garcia

== Managers ==
- (Germany) Ernst Künnecke (1 July 1988 – 1 Nov 1988)
- (Belgium) Joseph Vliers (3 Nov 1988 – 3 June 1989)
- (Bosnia and Herzegovina) Enver Ališić (3 Sep 1989 - 15 May 1990)
- (Belgium) Paul Theunis (1 July 1990 – 2 Nov 1991)
- (Belgium) Pier Janssen (1 Nov 1991 – 12 Oct 1993)
- (Croatia) Luka Peruzović (12 Oct 1993 – 19 Jan 1994)
- (Belgium) Norbert Beuls (19 Jan 1994 - 30 - June 1994)
- (Bosnia and Herzegovina) Enver Ališić (1 July 1994 - 21 Sep 1995)
- (Belgium) Pierre Denier (interim) (21 Sep 1995 – 24 Oct 1995)
- (Belgium) Aimé Anthuenis (24 Oct 1995 – 30 June 1999)
- (Belgium) Jos Heyligen (01 July 1999 – 6 Feb 2000)
- (Netherlands) Johan Boskamp (31 Jan 2000 – 31 Dec 2000)
- (Netherlands) Sef Vergoossen (1 July 2001 – 6 April 2004)
- (Belgium) René Vandereycken (17 May 2004 – 3 June 2005)
- (Belgium) Hugo Broos (13 June 2005 – 23 Feb 2008)
- (Belgium) Ronny Van Geneugden (17 Feb 2008 – 5 March 2009)
- (Belgium) Pierre Denier (interim) (6 March 2009 – 30 June 2009)
- (Belgium) Hein Vanhaezebrouck (1 July 2009 – 29 Nov 2009)
- (Belgium) Franky Vercauteren (3 Dec 2009 – 17 Aug 2011)
- (Belgium) Pierre Denier (interim) (18 Aug 2011 – 29 Aug 2011)
- (Netherlands) Mario Been (30 Aug 2011 – 24 Feb 2014)
- (Belgium) Emilio Ferrera (24 Feb 2014 – 29 July 2014)
- (Scotland) Alex McLeish (22 Aug 2014 – 2015)
- (Belgium) Peter Maes (2015 – 26 Dec 2016)
- (Netherlands) Albert Stuivenberg (27 Dec 2016 – 10 Dec 2017)
- (Belgium) Philippe Clement (18 Dec 2017 – 24 May 2019)
- (Belgium) Felice Mazzù (3 June 2019 – 12 Nov 2019)
- (Germany) Hannes Wolf (19 Nov 2019 – 15 Sep 2020)
- (Belgium) Domenico Olivieri (interim) (15 Sep 2020 – 24 Sep 2020)
- (Denmark) Jess Thorup (24 Sep 2020 – 2 Nov 2020)
- (Netherlands) John van den Brom (8 Nov 2020 – 6 Dec 2021)
- (Germany) Bernd Storck (8 Dec 2021 – 22 May 2022)
- (Belgium) Wouter Vrancken (28 May 2022 – 9 May 2024)
- (Belgium) Domenico Olivieri (interim) (10 May 2024 – 4 June 2024)
- (Germany) Thorsten Fink (5 June 2024 – 15 Dec 2025)
- (Belgium) Domenico Olivieri (interim) (16 Dec 2025 – 21 Dec 2025)
- (Belgium) Nicky Hayen (22 Dec 2025 – 10 July 2026)
- (Belgium) Peter Balette (interim) (10 July 2026 – 14 July 2026)
- (Denmark) Jess Thorup (15 July 2026 – )
