= 2022–23 KRC Genk season =

K.R.C. Genk
2022–23 season
- Chairman: Peter Croonen
- Manager: Wouter Vrancken
- Stadium: Cegeka Arena
- Pro League: 2nd
- Belgian Cup: Quarter-finals
- Top goalscorer: League: Joseph Paintsil (17); All: Joseph Paintsil (18)
Home colours	Away colours

The 2022–23 season was the 35th in the history of K.R.C. Genk and their 28th consecutive season in the top flight. The club participated in the Belgian Pro League and the Belgian Cup.

== Players ==
As of 31 August 2022

Note: Flags indicate national team as defined under FIFA eligibility rules; some limited exceptions apply. Players may hold more than one non-FIFA nationality.

No.	Pos.	Nation	Player
2	DF	USA	Mark McKenzie
3	DF	ESP	Mujaid Sadick
4	MF	CIV	Aziz Ouattara Mohammed
5	DF	MEX	Gerardo Arteaga
7	FW	TAN	Mbwana Samatta (on loan from Fenerbahçe)
8	MF	BEL	Bryan Heynen (captain)
10	MF	ARG	Nicolás Castro
11	MF	BEL	Mike Trésor
14	MF	NGR	Yira Sor
15	MF	BEL	Jay-Dee Geusens
17	MF	SVK	Patrik Hrošovský
19	MF	BEL	Anouar Ait El Hadj
20	FW	TAN	Kelvin John
22	DF	DEN	Rasmus Carstensen

No.	Pos.	Nation	Player
23	DF	COL	Daniel Muñoz
24	MF	BEL	Luca Oyen
25	MF	ARG	Matías Galarza
26	GK	BEL	Maarten Vandevoordt
27	DF	BEL	Matisse Didden
28	FW	GHA	Joseph Paintsil
30	GK	BEL	Vic Chambaere
34	MF	MAR	Bilal El Khannous
40	GK	BEL	Tobe Leysen
41	GK	BEL	Mike Penders
46	DF	COL	Carlos Cuesta
55	DF	BEL	Tuur Rommens
77	DF	ECU	Ángelo Preciado

=== Out on loan ===
Note: Flags indicate national team as defined under FIFA eligibility rules; some limited exceptions apply. Players may hold more than one non-FIFA nationality.

No.	Pos.	Nation	Player
—	MF	SUI	Bastien Toma (at Paços de Ferreira until 30 June 2023)

=== Other players under contract ===
Note: Flags indicate national team as defined under FIFA eligibility rules; some limited exceptions apply. Players may hold more than one non-FIFA nationality.

No.	Pos.	Nation	Player
—	MF	CIV	Eboue Kouassi

== Transfers ==
=== In ===
Pos	Player	Transferred from	Fee	Date	Source
MF	Ayman Rahbi	Antwerp	Undisclosed	1 July 2022	
MF	Nicolás Castro (ARG)	Newell's Old Boys (ARG)	Undisclosed	18 July 2022	
DF	Rasmus Carstensen (DEN)	Silkeborg (DEN)	Undisclosed	9 August 2022	
MF	Matías Galarza (ARG)	Argentinos Juniors (ARG)	Undisclosed	10 August 2022	
FW	Mbwana Samatta (TAN)	Fenerbahçe (TUR)	Loan	16 August 2022	
MF	Yira Sor (NGA)	Slavia Prague (CZE)	Undisclosed	1 January 2023	
MF	Anouar Ait El Hadj	Anderlecht	Undisclosed	18 January 2023	
FW	Tolu Arokodare (NGA)	Valmiera (LAT)	Undisclosed	31 January 2023	
MF	Bastien Toma (SUI)	Paços de Ferreira (POR)	End of loan	31 January 2023	

=== Out ===
Pos	Player	Transferred to	Fee	Date	Source
MF	Neto Borges (BRA)	Clermont Foot (FRA)	Free	1 July 2022	
MF	Madi Monamay	Bayer Leverkusen (GER)	Undisclosed	1 July 2022	
MF	Yentl Van Genechten	Eupen	Undisclosed	1 July 2022	
MF	Kristian Thorstvedt (NOR)	Sassuolo (ITA)	Undisclosed	12 July 2022	
FW	Arne Cuypers	Patro Eisden	Free	17 July 2022	
MF	Junya Ito (JPN)	Reims (FRA)	Undisclosed	29 July 2022	
FW	Iké Ugbo (CAN)	Troyes (FRA)	Undisclosed	4 August 2022	
FW	Cyriel Dessers (NGA)	Cremonese (ITA)	Undisclosed	10 August 2022	
DF	Jhon Lucumí (COL)	Bologna (ITA)	Undisclosed	18 August 2022	
MF	Théo Bongonda (DRC)	Cádiz (ESP)	Undisclosed	26 August 2022	
MF	Simen Juklerød (NOR)	Vålerenga (NOR)	Undisclosed	31 August 2022	
MF	Bastien Toma (SUI)	Paços de Ferreira (POR)	Loan	31 August 2022	
DF	Sébastien Dewaest	AEL Limassol (CYP)	Free	24 January 2023	
FW	András Németh (HUN)	Hamburger SV (GER)	Undisclosed	27 January 2023	
FW	Paul Onuachu (NGA)	Southampton (ENG)	Undisclosed	1 February 2023	

== Pre-season and friendlies ==
Win Draw Loss

25 June 2022 Friendly	Eendracht Termien (Belgium)	0–4	(Belgium) Genk	Genk
16:00 CEST (UTC+2)			Németh 10'; Toma 62'; Cuesta 85'; Cutillas-Carpe 88'	Stadium: Terrain 't Heke

2 July 2022 Friendly	Heist (Belgium)	1–8	(Belgium) Genk	Heist-op-den-Berg
16:00 CEST (UTC+2)	Rayane 72'		Cuesta 20'; Németh 53', 69', 88'; Oyen 65', 75', 86'; El Khannous 81'	Stadium: Gemeentelijk Sportcentrum

6 July 2022 Friendly	Utrecht (Netherlands)	1–2	(Belgium) Genk	Alkmaar, Netherlands
17:00 CEST (UTC+2)	Van de Streek 15'	Report	Németh 30'; El Khannous 56'	Attendance: 0 Referee: Preston Henshuijs

9 July 2022 Friendly	Volendam (Netherlands)	3–2	(Belgium) Genk	Alkmaar, Netherlands
14:30 CEST (UTC+2)	Van Mieghem 12'; El Kadiri 41'; Ould-Chikh 54'		Cuesta 79'; Németh 90+2'	Stadium: Sportpark Overdie

16 July 2022 Friendly	Genk (Belgium)	0–2	(Greece) AEK Athens	Genk
16:00 CEST (UTC+2)				Stadium: Cegeka Arena

17 July 2022 Friendly	Genk (Belgium)	4–0	(Belgium) Seraing	Belgium
14:00 CEST (UTC+2)	? 32'; John 35'; Paintsil 43'; Juklerød 45'	Report

6 December 2022 Friendly	Genk (Belgium)	3–1	(Netherlands) Heerenveen	Belgium
12:00 CET (UTC+1)	Samatta 40'; Castro 66'; Onuachu 80' (pen.)	Report	Colassin 30'	Attendance: 0 (behind closed doors)

10 December 2022 Friendly	Elche (Spain)	2–3	(Belgium) Genk	Elche, Spain
10:30 CET (UTC+1)	Ponce 13'; Milla 47'	Report	Preciado 16'; Onuachu 74' (pen.), 88'	Stadium: Estadio Manuel Martínez Valero; Attendance: 0

13 December 2022 Friendly	Genk (Belgium)	1–0	(France) Metz	La Nucia, Spain
16:00 CET (UTC+1)	Paintsil 10'	Report
Note: The match consisted of three 35 minute parts

== Competitions ==
=== Overall record ===
Competition	First match	Last match	Starting round	Final position	Record							
Competition	First match	Last match	Starting round	Final position	Pld	W	D	L	GF	GA	GD	Win %
Pro League	24 July 2022	23 April 2023	Matchday 1	1st	34	23	6	5	78	37	+41	67.65
Pro League Play-off I	30 April 2023	4 June 2023	1st	2nd	6	2	2	2	10	10	+0	33.33
Belgian Cup	9 November 2022	11 January 2023	Sixth round	Quarter-finals	3	2	0	1	2	3	−1	66.67
Total					43	27	8	8	90	50	+40	62.79

Last updated: 4 June 2023
Source: Soccerway

=== Pro League ===
==== League table ====
Pos	Team	Pld	W	D	L	GF	GA	GD	Pts	Qualification or relegation
1	Genk (J)	34	23	6	5	78	37	+41	75	Qualification for the Europa Conference League and Play-offs I (Note: The regular season winners will qualify for the 2023–24 UEFA Europa Conference League if they do not qualify for the 2023–24 UEFA Champions League in the playoffs.)
2	Union SG	34	23	6	5	70	41	+29	75	Qualification for the Play-offs I
3	Antwerp (C)	34	22	6	6	59	26	+33	72	Qualification for the Play-offs I
4	Club Brugge	34	16	11	7	61	36	+25	59	Qualification for the Play-offs I
5	Gent (U)	34	16	8	10	64	38	+26	56	Qualification for the Play-offs II

Source: Jupiler Pro League (in Dutch), Soccerway
Rules for classification: 1) Points; 2) Matches won; 3) Goal difference; 4) Goals scored; 5) Away matches won; 6) Away goal difference; 7) Away goals scored; 8) Play-off.
(C) Play-off I winner; (J) Regular season winner; (U) Play-off II winner

==== Results summary ====
Overall								Home						Away					
Pld	W	D	L	GF	GA	GD	Pts	W	D	L	GF	GA	GD	W	D	L	GF	GA	GD
34	23	6	5	78	37	+41	75	14	1	2	44	15	+29	9	5	3	34	22	+12

Last updated: 23 April 2023.
Source: Jupiler Pro League

==== Results by round ====
Round	1	2	3	4	5	6	7	8	9	10	11	12	13	14	15	16	17	18	19	20	21	23	22	24	25	26	27	28	29	30	31	32	33	34
Ground	A	H	H	A	H	A	H	A	H	A	H	A	H	A	H	H	A	A	H	H	A	H	A	A	H	A	H	A	H	A	H	A	H	A
Result	L	W	W	W	W	W	D	W	W	W	W	W	W	W	W	W	W	L	W	W	W	W	D	W	L	D	W	D	L	D	W	L	W	D
Position	12	4	2	2	2	2	2	2	2	2	2	1	1	1	1	1	1	1	1	1	1	1	1	1	1	1	1	1	1	1	1	1	1	1

Updated to match(es) played on 23 April 2023. Source: Jupiler Pro League
A = Away; H = Home; W = Win; D = Draw; L = Loss

==== Matches ====
The league fixtures were announced on 22 June 2022.

24 July 2022 1	Club Brugge	3–2	Genk	Bruges
13:30 CEST	Skov Olsen 22', 90+2'; Vanaken 60'	Report	Dessers 30'; Trésor 47'	Stadium: Jan Breydel Stadium; Attendance: 19,209; Referee: Nicolas Laforge

31 July 2022 2	Genk	3–1	Standard Liège	Genk
13:30 CEST	Dessers 5' 29' (pen.); Trésor 16'	Report	Drăguș 24'	Stadium: Cegeka Arena; Attendance: 15,134; Referee: Bram Van Driessche

6 August 2022 3	Genk	4–2	Eupen	Genk
16:00 CEST	Paintsil 3', 8'; Hrošovský 37'; Trésor 90+2'	Report	Prevljak 32'; Charles-Cook 59'	Stadium: Cegeka Arena; Attendance: 12,324; Referee: Alexandre Boucaut

14 August 2022 4	Zulte Waregem	1–4	Genk	Waregem
21:00 CEST	Vossen 43'	Report	Heynen 9' (pen.), 44'; Németh 25'; Muñoz 52'	Stadium: Elindus Arena; Attendance: 7,006; Referee: Lawrence Visser

20 August 2022 5	Genk	2–1	Cercle Brugge	Genk
18:15 CEST	Heynen 41', 57' (pen.)	Report	Deman 46'	Stadium: Cegeka Arena; Attendance: 14,742; Referee: Kevin Van Damme

27 August 2022 6	Seraing	0–4	Genk	Seraing
16:00 CEST		Report	Trésor 30', 66'; Paintsil 57'; Lepoint 68' (o.g.)	Stadium: Stade du Pairay; Attendance: 1,800; Referee: Jan Boterberg

3 September 2022 7	Genk	0–0	Sint-Truiden	Genk
16:00 CEST		Report		Stadium: Cegeka Arena; Attendance: 20,000; Referee: Jasper Vergoote

11 September 2022 8	Union SG	1–2	Genk	Brussels
18:30 CEST	Lapoussin 74'	Report	Paintsil 15'; Samatta 90+2'	Stadium: Joseph Marien Stadium; Attendance: 7,117; Referee: Lawrence Visser

18 September 2022 9	Genk	1–0	Gent	Genk
13:30 CEST	Heynen 90'	Report		Stadium: Cegeka Arena; Attendance: 15,185; Referee: Erik Lambrechts

1 October 2022 10	KV Oostende	1–2	Genk	Ostend
18:15 CEST	Hornby 3'	Report	Onuachu 25'; Muñoz 88'	Stadium: Diaz Arena; Attendance: 3,878; Referee: Wesli De Cremer

8 October 2022 11	Genk	2–1	Kortrijk	Genk
16:00 CEST	Onuachu 37', 79' (pen.)	Report	Selemani 58'	Stadium: Cegeka Arena; Attendance: 15,108; Referee: Jonathan Lardot

15 October 2022 12	OH Leuven	0–1	Genk	Heverlee
20:45 CEST		Report	Onuachu 16'	Stadium: King Power at Den Dreef; Attendance: 9,493; Referee: Kevin Van Damme

18 October 2022 13	Genk	6–1	Westerlo	Genk
20:45 CEST	Paintsil 7'; Muñoz 15', 45+4'; Onuachu 32', 40' (pen.); Hrošovský 79'	Report	Dierckx 21' (pen.)	Stadium: Cegeka Arena; Attendance: 15,189; Referee: Arthur Denil

23 October 2022 14	Antwerp	1–3	Genk	Antwerp
13:30 CEST	Janssen 42'	Report	Heynen 13'; Onuachu 33', 77'	Stadium: Bosuilstadion; Attendance: 15,955; Referee: Erik Lambrechts

28 October 2022 15	Genk	3–1	Mechelen	Genk
21:45 CEST	Muñoz 9'; Arteaga 57'; Paintsil 90+1'	Report	Schoofs 15'	Stadium: Cegeka Arena; Referee: Nathan Verboomen

4 November 2022 16	Genk	4–1	Charleroi	Genk
21:45 CEST	Onuachu 9' (pen.), 35', 71', 90+5'	Report	Heymans 66'	Stadium: Cegeka Arena; Referee: Alexandre Boucaut

13 November 2022 17	Anderlecht	0–2	Genk	Brussels
19:45 CEST		Report	Onuachu 19'; Arteaga 53'	Stadium: Lotto Park; Referee: Bram Van Driessche

26 December 2022 18	Kortrijk	1–0	Genk	Kortrijk
19:15 CEST	Avenatti 83'	Report		Stadium: Guldensporen Stadion; Referee: Kevin Van Damme

8 January 2023 19	Genk	3–1	Club Brugge	Genk
14:30 CEST	Cuesta 25'; Onuachu 67'; Heynen 81'	Report	Vanaken 21'	Stadium: Cegeka Arena; Referee: Lawrence Visser

14 January 2023 20	Genk	1–0	Zulte Waregem	Genk
21:45 CEST	Sor 10'	Report		Stadium: Cegeka Arena; Referee: Lothar D'hondt

17 January 2023 21	Westerlo	2–3	Genk	Westerlo
21:45 CEST	De Cuyper 53' (pen.); Van den Keybus 55'	Report	Ouattara 7'; Paintsil 24'; Muñoz 64'	Stadium: Het Kuipje; Referee: Alexandre Boucaut

29 January 2023 23	Genk	4–0	Seraing	Genk
22:00 CEST	Onuachu 7' (pen.), 60'; Trésor 14'; Paintsil 64'	Report		Stadium: Cegeka Arena; Referee: Wesli De Cremer

1 February 2023 22	Eupen	1–1	Genk	Eupen
18:45 CEST	Peeters 26' (pen.)	Report	Paintsil 17'	Stadium: Kehrwegstadion; Referee: Bert Put
Note: The match was postponed due to heavy snowfall.

5 February 2023 24	Gent	2–3	Genk	Ghent
19:30 CEST	Hong 9'; Depoitre 88'	Report	Paintsil 23'; Sor 67'; Arokodare 86'	Stadium: Ghelamco Arena; Referee: Lawrence Visser

12 February 2023 25	Genk	0–1	Antwerp	Genk
14:30 CEST		Report	Kerk 57'	Stadium: Cegeka Arena; Referee: Bram Van Driessche

17 February 2023 26	Mechelen	2–2	Genk	Mechelen
21:45 CEST	Hairemans 21'; Storm 75'	Report	Trésor 35'; Heynen 90+4'	Stadium: Achter de Kazerne; Referee: Wesli De Cremer

25 February 2023 27	Genk	3–0	KV Oostende	Genk
18:15 CEST	Muñoz 9'; Samatta 40'; Paintsil 73'	Report		Stadium: Cegeka Arena; Attendance: 16,287; Referee: Jasper Vergoote

5 March 2023 28	Sint-Truidense	2–2	Genk	Sint-Truiden
13:30 CEST	Konaté 45'; Bruno 77'	Report	Samatta 23', 62'	Stadium: Daio Wasabi Stayen Stadium; Attendance: 9,783; Referee: Erik Lambrechts

12 March 2023 29	Genk	1–2	Union SG	Genk
18:30 CEST	Heynen 24' (pen.)	Report	Nieuwkoop 42'; Adingra 44'	Stadium: Cegeka Arena; Referee: Nathan Verboomen

17 March 2023 30	Cercle Brugge	1–1	Genk	Bruges
20:45 CEST	Ueda 40'	Report	Paintsil 54'	Stadium: Jan Breydel Stadium; Referee: Jonathan Lardot

2 April 2023 31	Genk	2–1	OH Leuven	Genk
13:30 CEST	Heynen 23'; Trésor 87'	Report	Þorsteinsson 56' (pen.)	Stadium: Cegeka Arena; Referee: Jan Boterberg

9 April 2023 32	Standard Liège	2–0	Genk	Liège
18:30 CEST	Zinckernagel 33', 39' (pen.)	Report		Stadium: Stade Maurice Dufrasne; Referee: Nicolas Laforge

16 April 2023 33	Genk	5–2	Anderlecht	Genk
13:30 CEST	Samatta 36'; Ouattara 45+2'; Paintsil 49', 87'; El Khannous 53'	Report	Slimani 43'; Dreyer 64'	Stadium: Cegeka Arena; Referee: Erik Lambrechts

23 April 2023 34	Charleroi	2–2	Genk	Charleroi
18:30 CEST	Mbenza 3'; Nkuba 51'	Report	McKenzie 2'; Samatta 31'	Stadium: Stade du Pays de Charleroi; Referee: Bram Van Driessche

==== Play-offs I ====
Points obtained during the regular season were halved (and rounded up) before the start of the playoff. Genk and Union SG, therefore, started on 38 points, Antwerp on 36, and Club Brugge on 30. In case of ties between some of the teams, their relative order would be based on the following list: Antwerp (points not rounded up), Genk (regular season ranked 1), Union SG (regular season ranked 2), Club Brugge (regular season ranked 4).

Pos	Team	Pld	W	D	L	GF	GA	GD	Pts	Qualification or relegation	ANT	GNK	USG	CLU
1	Antwerp (C)	6	3	2	1	10	8	+2	47	Qualification for the Champions League play-off round	—	2–1	1–1	3–2
2	Genk (K)	6	2	2	2	10	10	0	46 (Note: Tied on Points and Points without half points added due to rounding. Regular Season finishing position: Genk 1, Union SG 2.)	Qualification for the Champions League second qualifying round	2–2	—	1–1	3–1
3	Union SG	6	2	2	2	8	8	0	46	Qualification for the Europa League play-off round	0–2	3–0	—	1–3
4	Club Brugge	6	2	0	4	10	12	−2	36	Qualification for the Europa Conference League second qualifying round	2–0	1–3	1–2	—

Source: Jupiler Pro League (in Dutch), Soccerway
Legend: Blue = home team win; Yellow = draw; Red = away team win.
Rules for classification: 1) Points; 2) Points without (possible) half points added due to rounding; 3) Regular season finishing position.
(C) Champions; (K) Regular season winner
Notes:

30 April 2023 1	Genk	3–1	Club Brugge	Genk
18:30 CEST	Muñoz 18'; McKenzie 56'; Paintsil 83'	Report	Vanaken 9'	Stadium: Cegeka Arena; Referee: Lawrence Visser

7 May 2023 2	Antwerp	2–1	Genk	Antwerp
18:30 CEST	McKenzie 20'	Report	Alderweireld 45+2' (pen.); Balikwisha 52'	Stadium: Bosuilstadion; Referee: Erik Lambrechts

14 May 2023 3	Union SG	3–0	Genk	Brussels
18:30 CEST	Burgess 12', 81'; Teuma 68' (pen.)	Report		Stadium: Joseph Marien Stadium; Referee: Jasper Vergoote

21 May 2023 4	Genk	1–1	Union SG	Genk
18:30 CEST	McKenzie 13'	Report	Boniface 39'	Stadium: Cegeka Arena; Referee: Jonathan Lardot

28 May 2023 5	Club Brugge	1–3	Genk	Bruges
18:30 CEST	Vanaken 64'	Report	Paintsil 12', 86'; Hrošovský 81'	Stadium: Jan Breydel Stadium; Referee: Lawrence Visser

4 June 2023 6	Genk	2–2	Antwerp	Genk
18:30 CEST	Arokodare 45'; Heynen 75'	Report	Kerk 58'; Alderweireld 90+4'	Stadium: Cegeka Arena; Referee: Nathan Verboomen

=== Belgian Cup ===
9 November 2022 Sixth round	Westerlo	0–1	Genk	Westerlo
20:30 CET		Report	Onuachu 14'	Stadium: Het Kuipje; Referee: Bert Put

21 December 2022 Seventh round	Genk	1–0 (a.e.t.)	Anderlecht	Genk
20:45 CET	Paintsil 95'	Report		Stadium: Cegeka Arena; Referee: Nathan Verboomen

11 January 2023 Quarter-final	Genk	0–3	Antwerp	Genk
20:45 CET		Report	Janssen 3'; De Laet 42'; Balikwisha 50'	Stadium: Cegeka Arena; Referee: Erik Lambrechts

== Statistics ==
=== Squad appearances and goals ===
Last updated on 23 April 2023

No.	Pos	Nat	Player	Total		Belgian Division		Belgian Cup	
No.	Pos	Nat	Player	Apps	Goals	Apps	Goals	Apps	Goals
Goalkeepers
26	GK	(Belgium) BEL	Maarten Vandevoordt	43	0	40	0	3	0
30	GK	(Belgium) BEL	Vic Chambaere	0	0	0	0	0	0
40	GK	(Belgium) BEL	Tobe Leysen	0	0	0	0	0	0
41	GK	(Belgium) BEL	Mike Penders	0	0	0	0	0	0
Defenders
2	DF	(United States) USA	Mark McKenzie	39	4	36	4	3	0
3	DF	(Spain) ESP	Mujaid Sadick	9	0	7+2	0	0	0
5	DF	(Mexico) MEX	Gerardo Arteaga	40	2	38	2	2	0
22	DF	(Norway) NOR	Rasmus Carstensen	4	0	0+4	0	0	0
23	DF	(Colombia) COL	Daniel Muñoz	39	11	36	11	3	0
27	DF	(Belgium) BEL	Matisse Didden	1	0	0+1	0	0	0
46	DF	(Colombia) COL	Carlos Cuesta	36	1	33	1	3	0
55	DF	(Belgium) BEL	Tuur Rommens	0	0	0	0	0	0
77	DF	(Ecuador) ECU	Angelo Preciado	27	0	10+14	0	1+2	0
Midfielders
4	MF	(Ivory Coast) CIV	Aziz Ouattara Mohammed	19	2	3+15	2	0+1	0
8	MF	(Belgium) BEL	Bryan Heynen	42	11	38+1	11	3	0
10	MF	(Argentina) ARG	Nicolás Castro	26	0	3+20	0	1+2	0
11	MF	(Belgium) BEL	Mike Trésor	42	7	38+1	7	3	0
14	MF	(Nigeria) NGR	Yira Sor	21	2	4+16	2	0+1	0
15	MF	(Belgium) BEL	Jay-Dee Geusens	1	0	0+1	0	0	0
17	MF	(Slovakia) SVK	Patrik Hrošovský	42	3	40	3	2	0
19	MF	(Belgium) BEL	Anouar Ait El Hadj	10	0	0+10	0	0	0
24	MF	(Belgium) BEL	Luca Oyen	6	0	2+4	0	0	0
25	MF	(Argentina) ARG	Matías Galarza	9	0	0+8	0	1	0
34	MF	(Morocco) MAR	Bilal El Khannous	41	1	35+4	1	2	0
Forwards
7	FW	(Tanzania) TAN	Mbwana Samatta	36	6	13+20	6	0+3	0
20	FW	(Tanzania) TAN	Kelvin John	0	0	0	0	0	0
28	FW	(Ghana) GHA	Joseph Paintsil	39	18	34+2	17	3	1
99	FW	(Nigeria) NGR	Tolu Arokodare	11	2	5+6	2	0	0
Players who have made an appearance this season but have left the club
7	FW	(Japan) JPN	Junya Itō	1	0	1	0	0	0
9	FW	(Nigeria) NGR	Cyriel Dessers	3	3	3	3	0	0
18	FW	(Nigeria) NGR	Paul Onuachu	32	17	14+15	16	3	1
33	DF	(Colombia) COL	Jhon Lucumí	3	0	3	0	0	0
35	FW	(Hungary) HUN	András Németh	16	1	4+11	1	0+1	0
