= Patrik Hrošovský =

Slovak footballer (born 1992)

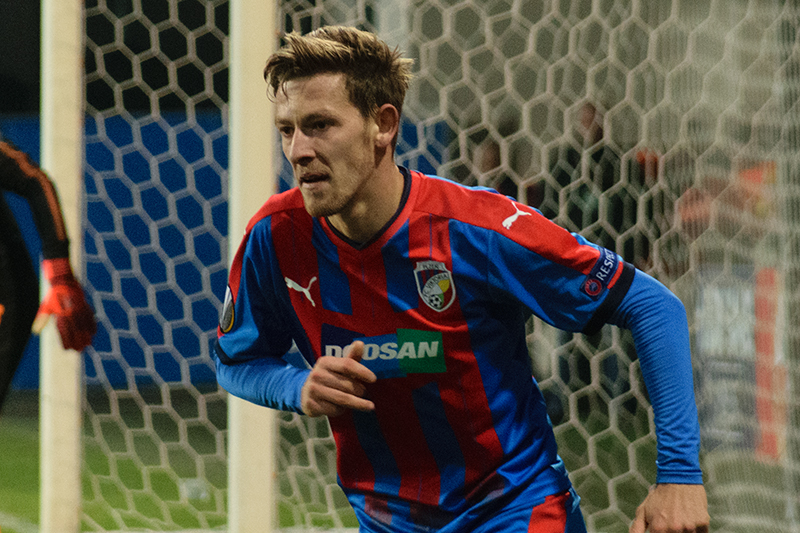
- Hrošovský playing for Viktoria Plzeň in 2017

Personal information
- Date of birth: 22 April 1992 (age 34)
- Place of birth: Bojnice, Czechoslovakia
- Height: 1.73 m (5 ft 8 in)
- Position: Midfielder

Team information
- Current team: Viktoria Plzeň
- Number: 17

Youth career
- 1998–2007: Prievidza
- 2007–2009: AAC Trenčín
- 2009–2011: Viktoria Plzeň

Senior career*
Years	Team	Apps	(Gls)
2011–2019	Viktoria Plzeň	158	(11)
2012	→ Baník Sokolov (loan)	13	(0)
2012–2013	→ Ústí nad Labem (loan)	28	(3)
2013	→ Znojmo (loan)	14	(4)
2019–2026	Genk	213	(18)
2026–	Viktoria Plzeň	21	(1)

International career^{‡}
- Slovakia U18
- Slovakia U19
2013–2014	Slovakia U21	9	(1)
2014–	Slovakia	62	(0)
- * Club domestic league appearances and goals as of 5 September 2026 ‡ National team caps and goals as of 22:43, 31 March 2026 (UTC)

Patrik Hrošovský (Slovak pronunciation: [ˈpatriɡ ˈɦrɔʂɔwskiː]; born 22 April 1992) is a Slovak professional football player who plays as a midfielder for Viktoria Plzeň and the Slovakia national football team. Previously he was a frequently fielded player and a captain at Viktoria Plzeň becoming the Czech champion with the side on three occasions.

== Club career ==
=== FC Viktoria Plzeň ===
Hrošovský debuted for Viktoria Plzeň on 12 November 2011 at the 2011–12 Czech Cup. against Baník Sokolov Having become a regular starter for multiple seasons as well as being praised for his performances at the 2018–19 UEFA Champions League, he was attracted interest from La Liga or the Premier League – Levante, Getafe, and Huddersfield Town were all named as possible future clubs. However, the winter transfer window, Hrošovský failed to make a transfer. During January 2019 transfer window, West Ham was also cited as a contender for his services, but it was dropped as Manuel Pellegrini did not consider altering the squad during the season.

=== Genk ===
==== 2019–20 season ====
On 5 June 2019, whilst preparing with the national team for a double fixture against Jordan and Azerbaijan, Hrošovský was said to almost complete his transfer to Genk. Verbal agreement was reached despite issues arising, as Viktoria agreed to let him leave during the summer transfer period to help the club qualify to the Champions League group stage. Genk was said to oppose this arrangement, but the transfer was more than an agreement, as Plzeň agreed with Wolverhampton Wanderers on a two-year loan with an option to buy. This was seen as a replacement for Christián Herc, who had made a good impression during his loan in DAC Dunajská Streda. However, the following day, Hrošovský clarified during a press conference prior to the match against Jordan. Although negotiations took place, there was no certainty of a transfer and that he was still a footballer for Viktoria Plzeň.

Nonetheless, this arrangement was confirmed on 8 July 2019, as Hrošovský signed a four-year contract with an option for an additional year. He made his Jupiler Pro League debut against multiple-time champions Anderlecht Brussels, in a home fixture on 23 August 2020. He completed the last, roughly, 20 minutes, as a replacement for Jakub Piotrowski. Genk secured a narrow 1:0 win with a second-half goal by Mbwana Samatta.

Hrošovský had recorded five starts for Genk in the UEFA Champions League. He played in both matches against Napoli and Red Bull Salzburg. He played against Liverpool at Anfield only. However, Genk collected a sole point for a goalless draw against Napoli and was knocked out with a score of 5:20.

On top of that, Hrošovský made sole seasonal appearance in the Croky Cup in a Round of 16 loss against Royal Antwerp. Genk were knocked out after a penalty shoot-out. Hrošovský was replaced by Théo Bongonda in the second half. As an occasional scorer, Hrošovský had to wait until 1 February 2020 for his first goal at Genk. In a league fixture against Charleroi, he had beaten Nicolas Penneteau with a back-heel goal in the 39th minute, utilising a pass from Junya Itō. He was replaced by Kristian Thorstvedt in the second-half. Genk won 1–0.

==== 2020–21 season ====
Hrošovský missed the first three games of the season, not even making it to the bench with reports that he was no longer considered by the manager Hannes Wolf. He sidelined along with Joseph Paintsil, despite being acquired for considerable sums earlier.

=== Return to Plzeň ===
On 9 January 2026, Hrošovský signed a one-and-half-year contract with Viktoria Plzeň with option.

== International career ==
On 19 November 2014, Hrošovský debuted for the Slovak senior squad as a starter in a 2–1 friendly victory against Finland.

He competed in his first major international tournament in the UEFA Euro 2016.

He was selected from the list of 26 Slovak players by the coach Štefan Tarkovič to participate in UEFA Euro 2020.

On 7 June 2024, he appeared in the list of 26 Slovak players selected by Francesco Calzona to participate in UEFA Euro 2024.

== Career statistics ==
=== Club ===
As of match played 15 March 2026

Club	Season	League			Cup		Continental		Other		Total	
Club	Season	Division	Apps	Goals	Apps	Goals	Apps	Goals	Apps	Goals	Apps	Goals
Baník Sokolov (loan)	2011–12	Czech National Football League	13	0	0	0	—		—		13	0
Ústí nad Labem (loan)	2012–13	Czech National Football League	28	3	0	0	—		—		28	3
Znojmo (loan)	2013–14	Czech First League	14	4	3	0	—		—		17	4
Viktoria Plzeň	2013–14	Czech First League	12	2	2	0	1 (Note: Apperanaces in UEFA Europa League)	0	—		15	2
Viktoria Plzeň	2014–15	Czech First League	28	0	3	0	1	0	1 (Note: Appearance in Czech-Slovak Supercup)	0	33	0
Viktoria Plzeň	2015–16	Czech First League	26	1	5	0	8 (Note: One appearance in UEFA Champions League, seven appearances and one goal in UEFA Europa League)	1	1	0	40	2
Viktoria Plzeň	2016–17	Czech First League	25	1	2	0	6 (Note: Three appearances in UEFA Champions League, three appearances in UEFA Europa League)	0	—		33	1
Viktoria Plzeň	2017–18	Czech First League	28	2	0	0	14 (Note: Two appearances in UEFA Champions League, twelve appearances in UEFA Europa League)	0	—		42	2
Viktoria Plzeň	2018–19	Czech First League	35	5	0	0	8 (Note: Six appearances and one goal in UEFA Champions League, two appearances in UEFA Europa League)	1	—		43	6
Viktoria Plzeň	2019–20	Czech First League	4	0	0	0	4 (Note: Two appearances in UEFA Champions League, two appearances in UEFA Europa League)	0	—		8	0
Viktoria Plzeň	Total		158	11	12	0	42	2	2	0	214	13
Genk	2019–20	Belgian First Division A	21	1	1	0	5 (Note: Appearances in UEFA Champions League)	0	—		27	1
Genk	2020–21	Belgian First Division A	30	2	4	0	—		—		34	2
Genk	2021–22	Belgian First Division A	32	5	1	0	6 (Note: Two appearances in UEFA Champions League, four appearances in UEFA Europa League)	0	1	0	40	5
Genk	2022–23	Belgian First Division A	40	3	2	0	—		—		42	3
Genk	2023–24	Belgian First Division A	40	0	2	0	11 (Note: Two appearances in UEFA Champions League, two appearances in UEFA Europa League, two appearances in UEFA Conference League)	0	—		53	0
Genk	2024–25	Belgian First Division A	34	6	4	0	—		—		38	6
Genk	2025–26	Belgian First Division A	16	1	2	0	8	2	—		26	3
Genk	Total		213	18	16	0	30	2	1	0	261	20
Viktoria Plzeň	2025–26	Czech First League	7	0	1	0	2	0	—		10	0
Career total			433	36	32	1	73	5	3	0	542	41

=== International ===
As of match played 31 March 2026

Appearances and goals by national team and year
National team	Year	Apps	Goals
Slovakia	2014	1	0
Slovakia	2015	6	0
Slovakia	2016	9	0
Slovakia	2017	2	0
Slovakia	2018	4	0
Slovakia	2019	3	0
Slovakia	2020	6	0
Slovakia	2021	10	0
Slovakia	2022	6	0
Slovakia	2023	6	0
Slovakia	2024	4	0
Slovakia	2025	4	0
Slovakia	2026	1	0
Total		62	0

== Honours ==
Viktoria Plzeň

- Czech First League: 2014–15, 2015–16, 2017–18
- Czech Cup runner-up: 2013–14
- Czech Supercup: 2011, 2015

Genk

- Belgian Cup: 2020–21

Slovakia

- King's Cup: 2018
