= 2020–21 KRC Genk season =

K.R.C. Genk
2020–21 season
- Chairman: Peter Croonen
- Manager: Hannes Wolf (until 15 September); Domenico Olivieri (caretaker, from 15 September until 24 September); Jess Thorup (from 24 September until 2 November); John van den Brom (from 8 November)
- Stadium: Luminus Arena
- Belgian First Division A: 2nd
- Belgian Cup: Winners
- Top goalscorer: League: Paul Onuachu (33); All: Paul Onuachu (35)
Home colours	Away colours	Third colours

The 2020–21 K.R.C. Genk season was the club's 33rd season in existence and the 26th consecutive season in the top flight of Belgian football. In addition to the domestic league, Genk participated in this season's edition of the Belgian Cup. The season covered the period from 1 July 2020 to 30 June 2021.

== Players ==
=== First-team squad ===
As of 1 February 2021

Note: Flags indicate national team as defined under FIFA eligibility rules; some limited exceptions apply. Players may hold more than one non-FIFA nationality.

No.	Pos.	Nation	Player
1	GK	AUS	Danny Vukovic (captain)
2	DF	USA	Mark McKenzie
4	MF	BEL	Dries Wouters
5	DF	MEX	Gerardo Arteaga
7	FW	JPN	Junya Ito
8	MF	BEL	Bryan Heynen
9	FW	NGR	Cyriel Dessers
10	FW	BEL	Théo Bongonda
11	MF	SUI	Bastien Toma
17	MF	SVK	Patrik Hrošovský
18	FW	NGR	Paul Onuachu
21	DF	FIN	Jere Uronen

No.	Pos.	Nation	Player
22	FW	BEL	Bryan Limbombe
23	DF	COL	Daniel Muñoz
24	MF	BEL	Luca Oyen
26	GK	BEL	Maarten Vandevoordt
33	DF	COL	Jhon Lucumí
38	MF	CIV	Eboue Kouassi
40	GK	BEL	Tobe Leysen
42	MF	NOR	Kristian Thorstvedt
46	DF	COL	Carlos Cuesta
77	DF	ECU	Angelo Preciado
80	MF	BEL	Pierre Dwomoh

=== Out on loan ===
Note: Flags indicate national team as defined under FIFA eligibility rules; some limited exceptions apply. Players may hold more than one non-FIFA nationality.

No.	Pos.	Nation	Player
6	DF	BEL	Sébastien Dewaest (at Toulouse until 30 June 2021)
14	FW	SWE	Benjamin Nygren (at SC Heerenveen until 30 June 2022)
15	FW	NGR	Stephen Odey (at Amiens until 30 June 2021)
20	MF	NOR	Mats Møller Dæhli (at 1. FC Nürnberg until 30 June 2020)

No.	Pos.	Nation	Player
30	GK	BEL	Nordin Jackers (at Waasland-Beveren until 30 June 2020)
—	DF	BRA	Neto Borges (at Vasco da Gama until 30 June 2021)
—	DF	BEL	Casper de Norre (at Leuven until 30 June 2021)
—	MF	GHA	Joseph Paintsil (at Ankaragücü until 30 June 2021)

== Transfers ==
=== In ===
No.	Pos	Player	Transferred from	Fee	Date	Source
9	FW	(Nigeria) Cyriel Dessers	(Netherlands) Heracles Almelo	Undisclosed	1 July 2020	
5	DF	(Mexico) Gerardo Arteaga	(Mexico) Santos Laguna	Undisclosed	5 August 2020	

=== Out ===
No.	Pos	Player	Transferred to	Fee	Date	Source
–	MF	(Morocco) Ismael Saibari	(Netherlands) Jong PSV	Undisclosed	1 July 2020	
31	DF	(Denmark) Joakim Mæhle	(Italy) Atalanta	€10M	4 January 2021	

== Pre-season and friendlies ==
Win Draw Loss

9 July 2020 Friendly	Eendracht Termien (Belgium)	Cancelled	(Belgium) Genk	Termien, Belgium
19:00 CEST (UTC+2)				Stadium: Terrain 't Heke

15 July 2020 Friendly	Genk (Belgium)	3–1	(Belgium) Union SG	Genk, Belgium
17:00 CEST (UTC+2)	Paintsil 21', 43'; Dæhli 33'	Report	Undav 49'	Stadium: Luminus Arena; Attendance: 0

17 July 2020 Friendly	Genk (Belgium)	4–1	(Netherlands) Excelsior	Genk, Belgium
17:00 CEST (UTC+2)	Bongonda 6', 33'; Borges 76'; Dessers 88'	Report	Ómarsson 73'	Stadium: Luminus Arena; Attendance: 0

25 July 2020 Friendly	AZ (Netherlands)	0–1	(Belgium) Genk	Alkmaar, Netherlands
12:00 CEST (UTC+2)		Report	Dessers 19' (pen.)	Stadium: AFAS Stadion; Attendance: 0

1 August 2020 Friendly	Genk (Belgium)	1–1	(France) Lens	Genk, Belgium
13:00 CEST (UTC+2)	Dessers 44' (pen.)	Report	Gradit (yellow card) 43'; Michelin (yellow card) 47'; Ganago 60'	Stadium: Luminus Arena; Attendance: 0

1 August 2020 Friendly	Genk (Belgium)	2–3	(France) Lens	Genk, Belgium
15:30 CEST (UTC+2)	Nygren 8'; Odey 83'	Report	Radovanović 10'; Sotoca 22'; Pereira Da Costa 24'	Stadium: Luminus Arena; Attendance: 0

10 August 2020 Friendly	Genk (Belgium)	3–2	(Belgium) RWDM	Genk, Belgium
14:00 CEST (UTC+2)	Adewoye 45+5'; Odey 63'; Balouk 82'	Report	Bova 38'; Yagan 45+3'	Stadium: Luminus Arena; Attendance: 0

16 August 2020 Friendly	Genk (Belgium)	9–0	(Luxembourg) Differdange	Genk, Belgium
16:00 CEST (UTC+2)	Oyen 28'; Nygren 45' (pen.); Limbombe 45+2'; Odey 55', 67', 87'; Adewoye 63'; Paintsil 82', 90+3'	Report		Stadium: Luminus Arena; Attendance: 0

24 August 2020 Friendly	Genk (Belgium)	2–2	(Belgium) Westerlo	Genk, Belgium
11:00 CEST (UTC+2)	Oyen 25'; Nygren 48'	Report	23'; 83'	Stadium: Luminus Arena; Attendance: 0

4 September 2020 Friendly	Genk (Belgium)	Cancelled	(Netherlands) Willem II	Belgium
14:00 CEST (UTC+2)

13 January 2021 Friendly	Union SG (Belgium)	4–4	(Belgium) Genk	Brussels, Belgium
13:30 CET (UTC+1)	Burgess 41'; Lynen 45'; Undav 58'; Vanzeir 60' (pen.)		Németh 11', 66'; Geusens 62' (pen.), 70' (pen.)	Stadium: Stade Joseph Marien

== Competitions ==
=== Overview ===
Competition	First match	Last match	Starting round	Final position	Record							
Competition	First match	Last match	Starting round	Final position	Pld	W	D	L	GF	GA	GD	Win %
Belgian First Division A	9 August 2020	23 May 2021	Matchday 1	2nd	40	21	9	10	82	53	+29	52.50
Belgian Cup	2 February 2021	25 April 2021	Sixth round	Winners	5	5	0	0	14	3	+11	100.00
Total					45	26	9	10	96	56	+40	57.78

Source: Soccerway

=== Belgian First Division A ===
==== Regular season ====
Pos	Team	Pld	W	D	L	GF	GA	GD	Pts	Qualification or relegation
2	Antwerp	34	18	6	10	57	48	+9	60	Qualification for the Play-offs I
3	Anderlecht	34	15	13	6	51	34	+17	58	Qualification for the Play-offs I
4	Genk (Note: Genk qualifies for at least the play-off round of the Europa League through winning the 2021 Belgian Cup.)	34	16	8	10	67	48	+19	56	Qualification for the Play-offs I
5	Oostende (Note: On 14 April 2021 news was released that both Excel Mouscron and Oostende had not received a Belgian professional football license for the coming season, a requirement to play at the top two levels of Belgian football. For Oostende, a lack of financial transparency, together with generally poor quality and incompleteness of the submitted report, was given as the main reason by the committee for not awarding a license, while Excel Mouscron was refused a license as besides insufficient transparency, the committee also questioned several cash flows and whether the club was creditworthy in general, also due to the fact that the wages for the months of February and March had not yet been paid at that point. For Excel Mouscron, it was already the sixth year running the license was (initially) refused, however, the club has appealed the decision with the Belgian Court for Sports Arbitrage (BAS) successfully on each occasion and intended to do so again. Oostende was planning to launch an appeal as well, with the BAS to rule on the matter for both clubs before the 10th of May. Both clubs were allowed to add new documents to their case, but in case they however still did not receive a license after appeal, knew they would have been forced to relegate to the 2021–22 Belgian Division 2 and start the season with a 3-point penalty. Both Excel Mouscron and Oostende were however eventually awarded a license after appeal, meaning Oostende remained at the top level, while Excel Mouscron only dropped one level.)	34	15	8	11	49	41	+8	53	Qualification for the Play-offs II
6	Standard Liège	34	13	11	10	52	41	+11	50	Qualification for the Play-offs II

Source: Jupiler Pro League (in Dutch), Soccerway
Rules for classification: 1) Points; 2) Matches won; 3) Goal difference; 4) Goals scored; 5) Away matches won; 6) Away goal difference; 7) Away goals scored; 8) Play-off.

==== Results summary ====
Overall								Home						Away					
Pld	W	D	L	GF	GA	GD	Pts	W	D	L	GF	GA	GD	W	D	L	GF	GA	GD
34	16	8	10	67	48	+19	56	9	5	3	38	20	+18	7	3	7	29	28	+1

Source: Jupiler Pro League

==== Results by round ====
Round	1	2	3	4	5	6	7	8	9	10	11	12	13	14	15	16	17	18	19	20	21	22	23	24	25	26	27	28	29	30	31	32	33	34
Ground	A	H	A	H	A	H	H	A	H	A	H	A	H	A	H	A	A	H	H	A	A	H	A	H	A	H	A	H	A	H	H	A	H	A
Result	W	D	D	L	L	W	D	D	W	W	W	W	W	W	W	L	W	W	D	L	L	D	L	W	D	L	L	L	W	W	D	W	W	L
Position	3	5	6	10	14	12	11	11	10	8	6	4	3	3	1	2	2	2	2	2	2	2	2	2	2	3	3	3	3	3	3	3	3	3

Source: Jupiler Pro League
A = Away; H = Home; W = Win; D = Draw; L = Loss

==== Matches ====
The league fixtures were announced on 8 July 2020.

9 August 2020 1	Zulte Waregem	1–2	Genk	Waregem
16:00 CEST (UTC+2)	Deschacht 41'; De Bock (yellow card) 47'; Berahino (yellow card) 56'; Opare (yellow card) 67'	Report	Onuachu 73', (yellow card) 90+4'; Dessers 80' (pen.)	Stadium: Regenboogstadion; Attendance: 0 Referee: Erik Lambrechts

15 August 2020 2	Genk	1–1	OH Leuven	Genk
16:30 CEST (UTC+2)	Wouters (yellow card) 7'; Ito 55'	Report	Ngawa (yellow card) 59'; Henry 85'	Stadium: Luminus Arena; Attendance: 0 Referee: Jasper Vergoote

23 August 2020 3	Standard Liège	0–0	Genk	Liège
13:30 CEST (UTC+2)	Amallah (yellow card) 44' (yellow-red card) 90'; Vojvoda (yellow card) 51'; Laifis (yellow card) 74'; Fai (yellow card) 77'; Gavory (yellow card) 81'	Report	Lucumí (yellow card) 30'; Muñoz (yellow card) 76'	Stadium: Stade Maurice Dufrasne; Attendance: 0 Referee: Nicolas Laforge

30 August 2020 4	Genk	1–2	Club Brugge	Genk
13:30 CEST (UTC+2)	Kouassi (yellow card) 54'; Bongonda 60' (pen.); Mæhle (yellow card) 81'; Uronen (yellow card) 90'; Arteaga (yellow card) 90+6'	Report	Vanaken 22'; Deli (yellow card) 28'; Mignolet (yellow card) 60'; Vormer (yellow card) 80'; Badji 83'	Stadium: Luminus Arena; Attendance: 0 Referee: Bram van Driessche

14 September 2020 5	Beerschot	5–2	Genk	Antwerp
20:45 CEST (UTC+2)	Holzhauser 12', 63' (pen.); Bourdin 49'; Vorogovskiy 85'; Noubissi 90'	Report	Onuachu 19' (pen.); Cuesta (yellow card) 58' (yellow-red card) 59'; Bongonda (red card) 68'; Lucumí (yellow card) 74'; Dessers 76' (pen.)	Stadium: Olympisch Stadion; Attendance: 3,200; Referee: Frederik Geldhof

20 September 2020 6	Genk	3–1	KV Mechelen	Genk
18:15 CEST (UTC+2)	Onuachu 10', 68'; Ito 55'	Report	Mrabti 6'; Van Damme (yellow card) 45+1'	Stadium: Luminus Arena; Attendance: 3,140; Referee: Alexandre Boucaut

28 September 2020 7	Genk	2–2	Oostende	Genk
20:45 CEST (UTC+2)	Onuachu 9', 52' (pen.); Lucumí (yellow card) 48'; Toma (red card) 56'	Report	McGeehan 3', (yellow card) 40'; Gueye (yellow card) 45', (goal) 83'; Hjulsager (yellow card) 87'; Bataille (yellow card) 90+5'; Ndicka (yellow card) 90+7'	Stadium: Luminus Arena; Attendance: 2,340; Referee: Nicolas Laforge

3 October 2020 8	Waasland-Beveren	1–1	Genk	Beveren
16:15 CEST (UTC+2)	Vukotić (yellow card) 32', (goal) 90+6'; Wiegel (yellow card) 59'; Albanese (yellow card) 73'	Report	Vandevoordt (yellow card) 17'; Hrošovský (yellow card) 39'; Onuachu 67'; Ito (yellow card) 70'	Stadium: Freethiel Stadion; Attendance: 1,750; Referee: Wim Smet

18 October 2020 9	Genk	2–1	Charleroi	Genk
18:15 CEST (UTC+2)	Onuachu 25', (yellow card) 82'; Ito (yellow card) 28' (yellow-red card) 82'; Mæhle 63'; Hrošovský (yellow card) 89'	Report	Willems (yellow card) 34'; Berahino 48'; Van Cleemput (yellow card) 60'	Stadium: Luminus Arena; Attendance: 2,743; Referee: Jonathan Lardot

26 October 2020 10	Gent	1–2	Genk	Ghent
20:45 CET (UTC+1)	Castro-Montes 24'; Kleindienst (yellow card) 73'	Report	Bongonda 40'; Muñoz (yellow card) 58'; Uronen (yellow card) 65'; Hrošovský 84'	Stadium: Ghelamco Arena; Attendance: 0 Referee: Jan Boterberg

30 October 2020 11	Genk	4–0	Eupen	Genk
20:45 CET (UTC+1)	Onuachu 5' (pen.); Dessers 48'; Bongonda 74', 82'; Wouters (yellow card) 81'	Report	N'Dri (yellow card) 70'; Kayembe (yellow card) 90+1'	Stadium: Luminus Arena; Attendance: 0 Referee: Bram Van Driessche

7 November 2020 12	Sint-Truiden	1–2	Genk	Sint-Truiden
20:45 CET (UTC+1)	Sankhon (yellow card) 6'; Suzuki 28'; García (yellow card) 41'; De Ridder (yellow card) 53' (yellow-red card) 90+2'; Caufriez (yellow card) 87'	Report	Bongonda 4', 31', (yellow card) 81'; Thorstvedt (yellow card) 49'	Stadium: Stayen; Attendance: 0 Referee: Erik Lambrechts

22 November 2020 13	Genk	4–1	Excel Mouscron	Genk
20:45 CET (UTC+1)	Onuachu (yellow card) 39', (goal) 63'; Ito 45+2'; Bongonda 55', 81'	Report	Bakić (yellow card) 17'; Da Costa 34', (yellow card) 79'; Ciranni (yellow card) 38'; Badibanga (yellow card) 80'	Stadium: Luminus Arena; Attendance: 0 Referee: Nicolas Laforge

28 November 2020 14	Cercle Brugge	1–5	Genk	Bruges
18:30 CET (UTC+1)	Hotić (yellow card) 33', (goal) 51'; Marcelin (yellow card) 62'	Report	Onuachu 9', 38'; Ito 16'; Heynen 30'; Bongonda 74'	Stadium: Jan Breydel Stadium; Attendance: 0 Referee: Kevin Van Damme

6 December 2020 15	Genk	4–2	Antwerp	Genk
13:30 CET (UTC+1)	Onuachu 19', 23'; Uronen (yellow card) 45'; Bongonda 59'; Dessers 88'	Report	Miyoshi 3'; De Laet (yellow card) 40'; Hongla (yellow card) 40'; Lukaku (yellow card) 61'; Mbokani 83'	Stadium: Luminus Arena; Attendance: 0 Referee: Bram Van Driessche

11 December 2020 16	Anderlecht	1–0	Genk	Anderlecht
20:45 CET (UTC+1)	Nmecha 59' (pen.)	Report		Stadium: Constant Vanden Stock Stadium; Attendance: 0 Referee: Nathan Verboomen

19 December 2020 18	Genk	2–0	Kortrijk	Genk
20:45 CET (UTC+1)	Arteaga 1'; Hrošovský (yellow card) 35'; Bongonda 78'	Report	De Sart (yellow card) 77'; Ocansey (yellow card) 87'	Stadium: Luminus Arena; Attendance: 0 Referee: Alexandre Boucaut

27 December 2020 19	Genk	1–1	Waasland-Beveren	Genk
16:00 CET (UTC+1)	Onuachu 24'	Report	Koita 45+2'; Wuytens (yellow card) 49'; Frey (yellow card) 80'; Heymans (yellow card) 85'	Stadium: Luminus Arena; Attendance: 0 Referee: Kevin Van Damme

6 January 2021 17	Eupen	1–4	Genk	Eupen
20:45 CET (UTC+1)	Peeters 14'; Kayembe (yellow card) 45+4'; Defourny (yellow card) 47'; Amat (yellow card) 62'	Report	Ito 9'; Onuachu 42', 48' (pen.), 60' (pen.); Kouassi (yellow card) 45+1'	Stadium: Kehrwegstadion; Attendance: 0 Referee: Bram Van Driessche

9 January 2021 20	Kortrijk	2–1	Genk	Kortrijk
18:30 CET (UTC+1)	Gueye 23', 54'; Hines-Ike (yellow card) 57'	Report	Onuachu 41'; Kouassi (yellow card) 60'; Ito (yellow card) 73'	Stadium: Guldensporen Stadion; Attendance: 0 Referee: Wesli De Cremer

16 January 2021 21	Excel Mouscron	2–0	Genk	Mouscron
18:30 CET (UTC+1)	Olinga 29'; Tabekou 71'	Report		Stadium: Stade Le Canonnier; Attendance: 0 Referee: Jasper Vergoote

21 January 2021 22	Genk	1–1	Gent	Genk
21:00 CET (UTC+1)	Onuachu 7'; Cuesta (red card) 12'; Toma (yellow card) 25'; Vukovic (yellow card) 45+6'; Ito (penalty missed) 68'	Report	Yaremchuk 45+3'; Ngadeu-Ngadjui (yellow card) 45+5'; Dorsch (yellow card) 60'; Marreh (yellow card) 83'; Depoitre (yellow card) 83'	Stadium: Luminus Arena; Attendance: 0 Referee: Nicolas Laforge

24 January 2021 23	Club Brugge	3–2	Genk	Bruges
13:30 CET (UTC+1)	Dost 7'; Vormer 65'; Mechele 77'	Report	Ito 24'; Toma 34'; Thorstvedt (yellow card) 90+3'	Stadium: Jan Breydel Stadium; Attendance: 0 Referee: Lawrence Visser

27 January 2021 24	Genk	3–2	Zulte Waregem	Genk
18:45 CET (UTC+1)	Onuachu 45+1', 52'; Ito 67'	Report	De Bock 72'; Bruno 88' (pen.)	Stadium: Luminus Arena; Attendance: 0 Referee: Alexandre Boucaut

30 January 2021 25	KV Mechelen	0–0	Genk	Mechelen
16:15 CET (UTC+1)	Bijker (yellow card) 5'; Van Damme (yellow card) 56'	Report	Preciado (yellow card) 9'; Thorstvedt (yellow card) 51'; Heynen (yellow card) 90+1'	Stadium: Achter de Kazerne; Attendance: 0 Referee: Christof Dierick

7 February 2021 26	Genk	1–2	Anderlecht	Genk
18:15 CET (UTC+1)	Bongonda 2'; Heynen (yellow card) 49'; Arteaga (yellow card) 54'; Lucumí (yellow card) 90+1'	Report	Vukovic 19' (o.g.); El Hadj 22'; Cullen (yellow card) 28'; Wellenreuther (yellow card) 89'	Stadium: Luminus Arena; Attendance: 0 Referee: Bram Van Driessche

17 February 2021 27	Oostende	3–1	Genk	Ostend
19:00 CET (UTC+1)	Hubert (yellow card) 9'; Gueye 22' (pen.), 26' (pen.); Theate 58'	Report	Onuachu 10' (pen.); Cuesta (yellow card) 26'; McKenzie (yellow card) 90+1'	Stadium: Diaz Arena; Attendance: 0 Referee: Wim Smet

21 February 2021 28	Genk	1–2	Beerschot	Genk
18:15 CET (UTC+1)	Bongonda (yellow card) 66'; Muñoz (yellow card) 81'; Hrošovský 90+3'	Report	Radić (yellow card) 14'; Sanusi (yellow card) 58'; Van den Bergh 65'; Holzhauser 82' (pen.); Pietermaat (yellow card) 89'	Stadium: Luminus Arena; Attendance: 0 Referee: Bert Put

26 February 2021 29	Charleroi	1–2	Genk	Charleroi
20:45 CET (UTC+1)	Gholizadeh 52'; Ilaimaharitra (yellow card) 77'; Van Cleemput (yellow card) 86'	Report	Onuachu 17' (pen.); Heynen (yellow card) 59'; Thorstvedt (yellow card) 77', (goal) 83'	Stadium: Stade du Pays de Charleroi; Attendance: 0 Referee: Jan Boterberg

7 March 2021 30	Genk	2–0	Cercle Brugge	Genk
20:45 CET (UTC+1)	Onuachu 9'; Ito 24'; Heynen (yellow card) 37'	Report	Marcelin (yellow card) 20'; Van der Bruggen (yellow card) 27' (yellow-red card) 39'; Pavlović (yellow card) 87'	Stadium: Luminus Arena; Attendance: 0 Referee: Alexandre Boucaut

19 March 2021 31	Genk	2–2	Standard Liège	Genk
20:45 CET (UTC+1)	Lucumí (yellow card) 36'; Ito (yellow card) 44', (goal) 59', 72'	Report	Klauss 54'; Pavlovic (yellow card) 62'; Siquet (yellow card) 69'; Muleka 81', (yellow card) 85'; Laifis (yellow card) 90+1'	Stadium: Luminus Arena; Attendance: 0 Referee: Erik Lambrechts

5 April 2021 32	OH Leuven	2–3	Genk	Leuven
13:30 CEST (UTC+2)	Ngawa (yellow card) 25'; Mercier 74'; Henry 90+2'	Report	Thorstvedt 7'; Bongonda 81'; Onuachu 83'	Stadium: Den Dreef; Attendance: 0 Referee: Jan Boterberg

11 April 2021 33	Genk	4–0	Sint-Truiden	Genk
13:30 CEST (UTC+2)	Bongonda 21'; Heynen 24'; Thorstvedt 35'; Onuachu 53'	Report	Brüls (yellow card) 20'; Suzuki (penalty missed) 41'	Stadium: Luminus Arena; Attendance: 0 Referee: Alexandre Boucaut

17 April 2021 34	Antwerp	3–2	Genk	Antwerp
20:45 CEST (UTC+2)	Seck (yellow card) 44'; Lamkel Zé (yellow card) 55', (goal) 67'; Mbokani (yellow card) 89', (goal) 90'; Batubinsika 90+2'	Report	Onuachu 22', 64' (pen.); Heynen (yellow card) 31'	Stadium: Bosuilstadion; Attendance: 0 Referee: Lothar D'hondt

==== Play-Off I ====
Pos	Team	Pld	W	D	L	GF	GA	GD	Pts	Qualification or relegation	CLU	GNK	ANT	AND
1	Club Brugge (C)	6	1	3	2	8	11	−3	44	Qualification for the Champions League group stage	—	1–2	2–1	2–2
2	Genk	6	5	1	0	15	5	+10	44	Qualification for the Champions League third qualifying round	3–0	—	4–0	1–1
3	Antwerp	6	1	2	3	6	11	−5	35	Qualification for the Europa League play-off round	0–0	2–3	—	1–0
4	Anderlecht	6	0	4	2	9	11	−2	33	Qualification for the Europa Conference League third qualifying round	3–3	1–2	2–2	—

Source: Jupiler Pro League (in Dutch), Soccerway
Legend: Blue = home team win; Yellow = draw; Red = away team win.
Rules for classification: 1) Points; 2) Points without (possible) half points added due to rounding; 3) Regular season finishing position.
(C) Champions

==== Results summary ====
Overall								Home						Away					
Pld	W	D	L	GF	GA	GD	Pts	W	D	L	GF	GA	GD	W	D	L	GF	GA	GD
6	5	1	0	15	5	+10	16	2	1	0	8	1	+7	3	0	0	7	4	+3

Source: Jupiler Pro League

==== Results by round ====
Round	1	2	3	4	5	6
Ground	A	H	H	A	H	A
Result	W	W	D	W	W	W
Position	2	2	2	2	2	2

Source: Jupiler Pro League
A = Away; H = Home; W = Win; D = Draw; L = Loss

==== Matches ====
30 April 2021 1	Antwerp	2–3	Genk	Antwerp
20:45 CEST (UTC+2)	De Laet (yellow card) 10'; Le Marchand 57'; Miyoshi 61'; Verstraete (yellow card) 74'; Boya (yellow card) 81'	Report	Bongonda 20', 88'; Onuachu 73'; Arteaga (yellow card) 82'	Stadium: Bosuilstadion; Attendance: 0 Referee: Nicolas Laforge

7 May 2021 2	Genk	3–0	Club Brugge	Genk
20:45 CEST (UTC+2)	Onuachu 57', (yellow card) 68'; Ito 74'; Thorstvedt 75'	Report	Vanaken (yellow card) 69'; Lang (yellow card) 81'; Sobol (yellow card) 84'	Stadium: Luminus Arena; Attendance: 0 Referee: Lawrence Visser

12 May 2021 3	Genk	1–1	Anderlecht	Genk
20:45 CEST (UTC+2)	Muñoz (yellow card) 45'; Hrošovský (yellow card) 62'; Onuachu 67'; Lucumí (yellow card) 79'; Heynen (yellow card) 79'	Report	El Hadj 33'; Sambi Lokonga (yellow card) 66'	Stadium: Luminus Arena; Attendance: 0 Referee: Nathan Verboomen

15 May 2021 4	Anderlecht	1–2	Genk	Anderlecht
20:45 CEST (UTC+2)	Nmecha 31'; Murillo (yellow card) 73'	Report	Onuachu 16'; Hrošovský (yellow card) 50'; Dessers 86'; Bongonda (yellow card) 90+5'	Stadium: Constant Vanden Stock Stadium; Attendance: 0 Referee: Jonathan Lardot

20 May 2021 5	Genk	4–0	Antwerp	Genk
18:30 CEST (UTC+2)	Thorstvedt 43', 49', 64'; Dessers 75'	Report	Miyoshi (yellow card) 16'; Lamkel Zé (yellow card) 67'	Stadium: Luminus Arena; Attendance: 0 Referee: Jan Boterberg

23 May 2021 6	Club Brugge	1–2	Genk	Bruges
18:30 CEST (UTC+2)	Vanaken (penalty missed) 34'; Sobol (yellow card) 71'; Vormer 80'	Report	Toma 61'; Dessers 85' (pen.)	Stadium: Jan Breydel Stadium; Attendance: 0 Referee: Kevin Van Damme

=== Belgian Cup ===
2 February 2021 Sixth round	Tessenderlo	0–5	Genk	Tessenderlo
18:00 CET (UTC+1)				Stadium: Gemeentelijk Sportpark
Note: On 19 January 2021, Tessenderlo forfeited the match against Genk which progressed automatically to the seventh round.

10 February 2021 Seventh round	Genk	1–0	Sint-Truiden	Genk
18:00 CET (UTC+1)	Thorstvedt (yellow card) 24'; Onuachu 87'	Report		Stadium: Luminus Arena; Attendance: 0 Referee: Alexandre Boucaut

4 March 2021 Quarter-finals	Genk	4–1	KV Mechelen	Genk
18:00 CET (UTC+1)	Thorstvedt 2', 64'; Muñoz 10'; Bongonda 85'	Report	Mrabti 82'; Vranckx (yellow card) 87'	Stadium: Luminus Arena; Attendance: 0 Referee: Nicolas Laforge

14 March 2021 Semi-finals	Anderlecht	1–2	Genk	Anderlecht
20:45 CET (UTC+1)	Cullen (yellow card) 51'; Trebel 73'; Mukairu (yellow card) 81'; Miazga (yellow card) 90+2'	Report	Onuachu 17'; Miazga 59' (o.g.); Lucumí (red card) 71'; Thorstvedt (yellow card) 89'	Stadium: Constant Vanden Stock Stadium; Attendance: 0 Referee: Jonathan Lardot

25 April 2021 Final	Standard Liège	1–2	Genk	Brussels
20:45 CEST (UTC+2)	Gavory (yellow card) 63'; Muleka (yellow card) 65', (goal) 83'; Raskin (yellow card) 71'; Carcela (yellow card) 81'; Amallah (yellow card) 87'; Sissako (red card) 90+2'	Report	Ito 48'; Muñoz (yellow card) 56'; Bongonda 80'; Hrošovský (yellow card) 90'	Stadium: King Baudouin Stadium; Attendance: 0 Referee: Bram Van Driessche

== Statistics ==
=== Squad appearances and goals ===
Last updated on 23 May 2021.

No.	Pos	Nat	Player	Total		Belgian Division		Belgian Cup	
No.	Pos	Nat	Player	Apps	Goals	Apps	Goals	Apps	Goals
Goalkeepers
1	GK	(Australia) AUS	Danny Vukovic	24	0	24	0	0	0
26	GK	(Belgium) BEL	Maarten Vandevoordt	20	0	16	0	4	0
40	GK	(Belgium) BEL	Tobe Leysen	0	0	0	0	0	0
Defenders
2	DF	(United States) USA	Mark McKenzie	16	0	8+5	0	1+2	0
5	DF	(Mexico) MEX	Gerardo Arteaga	28	1	21+4	1	3	0
21	DF	(Finland) FIN	Jere Uronen	23	0	21+1	0	1	0
23	DF	(Colombia) COL	Daniel Muñoz	44	1	37+3	0	4	1
33	DF	(Colombia) COL	Jhon Lucumí	41	0	36+2	0	3	0
35	DF	(Belgium) BEL	Shawn Adewoye	0	0	0	0	0	0
46	DF	(Colombia) COL	Carlos Cuesta	38	0	34	0	4	0
77	DF	(Ecuador) ECU	Angelo Preciado	10	0	7+3	0	0	0
Midfielders
4	MF	(Belgium) BEL	Dries Wouters	8	0	4+4	0	0	0
8	MF	(Belgium) BEL	Bryan Heynen	33	2	27+2	2	4	0
11	MF	(Switzerland) SUI	Bastien Toma	21	2	12+7	2	1+1	0
16	MF	(Belgium) BEL	Elias Sierra	1	0	0+1	0	0	0
17	MF	(Slovakia) SVK	Patrik Hrošovský	34	2	27+3	2	3+1	0
24	MF	(Belgium) BEL	Luca Oyen	21	0	4+16	0	1	0
38	MF	(Ivory Coast) CIV	Eboue Kouassi	18	0	7+11	0	0	0
42	MF	(Norway) NOR	Kristian Thorstvedt	34	9	22+8	7	4	2
80	MF	(Belgium) BEL	Pierre Dwomoh	2	0	0+2	0	0	0
Forwards
7	FW	(Japan) JPN	Junya Ito	42	12	37+1	11	4	1
9	FW	(Nigeria) NGR	Cyriel Dessers	34	7	6+26	7	1+1	0
10	FW	(Belgium) BEL	Theo Bongonda	39	18	34+1	16	3+1	2
18	FW	(Nigeria) NGR	Paul Onuachu	41	35	36+2	33	3	2
22	FW	(Belgium) BEL	Bryan Limbombe	4	0	0+4	0	0	0
Players who have made an appearance this season but have left the club
2	DF	(Belgium) BEL	Casper de Norre	0	0	0	0	0	0
5	DF	(Brazil) BRA	Neto Borges	0	0	0	0	0	0
6	DF	(Belgium) BEL	Sébastien Dewaest	0	0	0	0	0	0
31	DF	(Denmark) DEN	Joakim Mæhle	16	1	16	1	0	0
20	MF	(Norway) NOR	Mats Møller Dæhli	5	0	2+3	0	0	0
11	FW	(Ghana) GHA	Joseph Paintsil	0	0	0	0	0	0
14	FW	(Sweden) SWE	Benjamin Nygren	3	0	1+2	0	0	0
15	FW	(Nigeria) NGR	Stephen Odey	0	0	0	0	0	0

=== Goalscorers ===
As of 23 May 2021

Rank	No.	Pos	Nat	Name	Pro League	Belgian Cup	Total
1	18	FW	(Nigeria)	Paul Onuachu	33	2	35
2	27	FW	(Belgium)	Théo Bongonda	16	2	18
3	7	FW	(Japan)	Junya Ito	11	1	12
4	42	MF	(Norway)	Kristian Thorstvedt	7	2	9
5	9	FW	(Nigeria)	Cyriel Dessers	7	0	7
6	8	MF	(Belgium)	Bryan Heynen	2	0	2
6	11	MF	(Switzerland)	Bastien Toma	2	0	2
6	17	MF	(Slovakia)	Patrik Hrošovský	2	0	2
9	5	DF	(Mexico)	Gerardo Arteaga	1	0	1
9	23	DF	(Colombia)	Daniel Muñoz	0	1	1
9	31	DF	(Denmark)	Joakim Mæhle	1	0	1
Own goal					0	1	1
Totals					82	9	91
