= 2021–22 KRC Genk season =

Genk
2021–22 season
- Chairman: Peter Croonen
- Manager: John van den Brom (until 6 December); Bernd Storck (from 7 December)
- Stadium: Luminus Arena
- First Division A: 8th
- Belgian Cup: Seventh round
- Belgian Super Cup: Runners-up
- UEFA Champions League: Third qualifying round
- UEFA Europa League: Group stage
- Top goalscorer: League: Paul Onuachu (21); All: Paul Onuachu (23)
Home colours	Away colours	Third colours

The 2021–22 season was the 34th season in the existence of K.R.C. Genk and the club's 27th consecutive season in the top flight of Belgian football. In addition to the domestic league, Genk participated in this season's editions of the Belgian Cup, the Belgian Super Cup where it finished as runners-up, the UEFA Champions League where it got eliminated in the third qualifying round and in the UEFA Europa League.

== Players ==
=== First-team squad ===
As of 28 January 2022

Note: Flags indicate national team as defined under FIFA eligibility rules; some limited exceptions apply. Players may hold more than one non-FIFA nationality.

No.	Pos.	Nation	Player
2	DF	USA	Mark McKenzie
3	DF	ESP	Mujaid Sadick
4	MF	CIV	Aziz Ouattara Mohammed
5	DF	MEX	Gerardo Arteaga
6	DF	NOR	Simen Juklerød
7	FW	JPN	Junya Itō
8	MF	BEL	Bryan Heynen (captain)
10	FW	BEL	Théo Bongonda
11	MF	BEL	Mike Trésor
15	MF	BEL	Jay-Dee Geusens
17	MF	SVK	Patrik Hrošovský
18	FW	NGR	Paul Onuachu

No.	Pos.	Nation	Player
23	DF	COL	Daniel Muñoz
24	MF	BEL	Luca Oyen
25	DF	BEL	Tuur Rommens
26	GK	BEL	Maarten Vandevoordt
28	FW	GHA	Joseph Paintsil
30	GK	BEL	Vic Chambaere
33	DF	COL	Jhon Lucumí
35	MF	HUN	András Németh
40	GK	BEL	Tobe Leysen
42	MF	NOR	Kristian Thorstvedt
46	DF	COL	Carlos Cuesta
77	DF	ECU	Ángelo Preciado

=== Other players under contract ===
Note: Flags indicate national team as defined under FIFA eligibility rules; some limited exceptions apply. Players may hold more than one non-FIFA nationality.

No.	Pos.	Nation	Player
—	FW	TAN	Kelvin John

=== Out on loan ===
Note: Flags indicate national team as defined under FIFA eligibility rules; some limited exceptions apply. Players may hold more than one non-FIFA nationality.

No.	Pos.	Nation	Player
—	DF	BRA	Neto Borges (at Tondela until 30 June 2022)
—	DF	BEL	Sébastien Dewaest (at OH Leuven until 30 June 2022)
—	MF	CIV	Eboue Kouassi (at Arouca until 30 June 2022)
—	MF	SUI	Bastien Toma (at St. Gallen until 30 June 2022)

No.	Pos.	Nation	Player
—	FW	CAN	Iké Ugbo (at Troyes until 30 June 2022)
—	FW	NGR	Cyriel Dessers (at Feyenoord until 30 June 2022)
—	FW	NGR	Stephen Odey (at Randers until 30 June 2022)

== Pre-season and friendlies ==
Win Draw Loss Fixtures

3 July 2021 Friendly	Eendracht Termien (Belgium)	1–8	(Belgium) Genk	Genk, Belgium
14:00 CEST (UTC+2)	Piras 28'	Report	Diawara 20', 42'; Németh 35'; Dessers 52', 56'; John 65'; Abid 73'; Paintsil 83'	Stadium: Terrain 't Heke

7 July 2021 Friendly	Genk (Belgium)	2–0	(Belgium) Eupen	Genk, Belgium
14:00 CEST (UTC+2)	Németh 49'; Heynen 58'	Report		Stadium: Luminus Arena

10 July 2021 Friendly	Genk (Belgium)	1–1	(Netherlands) FC Groningen	Genk, Belgium
16:00 CEST (UTC+2)	Paintsil 65'	Report	De Leeuw 26'	Stadium: Jos Vaessen Talent Academy

14 July 2021 Friendly	Genk (Belgium)	1–1	(Netherlands) AZ	Genk, Belgium
16:00 CEST (UTC+2)	Dessers 78'	Report	Oosting 90'	Stadium: B-Veld Racing Genk

19 July 2021 Friendly	Genk (Belgium)	5–2	(Netherlands) MVV	Genk, Belgium
12:00 CEST (UTC+2)	Dessers 31' (pen.), 47'; Oyen 51'; John 63'; Diawara 72'	Report	Bösing 26'; Blummel 45+2'	Stadium: B-Veld Racing Genk

27 July 2021 Friendly	Genk (Belgium)	1–3	(Belgium) RWDM	Genk, Belgium
12:00 CEST (UTC+2)				Stadium: B-Veld Racing Genk

== Competitions ==
=== Overall record ===
Competition	First match	Last match	Starting round	Final position	Record							
Competition	First match	Last match	Starting round	Final position	Pld	W	D	L	GF	GA	GD	Win %
First Division A	23 July 2021	21 May 2022	Matchday 1	8th	40	18	8	14	76	55	+21	45.00
Belgian Cup	27 October 2021	1 December 2021	Sixth round	Seventh round	2	1	1	0	9	3	+6	50.00
Belgian Super Cup	17 July 2021		Final	Runners-up	1	0	0	1	2	3	−1	0.00
UEFA Champions League	3 August 2021	10 August 2021	Third qualifying round	Third qualifying round	2	0	0	2	2	4	−2	0.00
UEFA Europa League	16 September 2021	9 December 2021	Group stage	Group stage	6	1	2	3	4	10	−6	16.67
Total					51	20	11	20	93	75	+18	39.22

Last updated: 21 May 2022
Source: Soccerway

=== First Division A ===
==== League table ====
Pos	Team	Pld	W	D	L	GF	GA	GD	Pts	Qualification or relegation
6	Charleroi	34	15	9	10	55	46	+9	54	Qualification for the Play-offs II
7	Mechelen	34	15	7	12	57	61	−4	52	Qualification for the Play-offs II
8	Genk	34	15	6	13	66	47	+19	51	Qualification for the Play-offs II
9	Sint-Truiden	34	15	6	13	42	40	+2	51	
10	Cercle Brugge	34	12	9	13	49	46	+3	45	

Source: Jupiler Pro League (in Dutch), Soccerway
Rules for classification: 1) Points; 2) Matches won; 3) Goal difference; 4) Goals scored; 5) Away matches won; 6) Away goal difference; 7) Away goals scored; 8) Play-off.

==== Results summary ====
Overall								Home						Away					
Pld	W	D	L	GF	GA	GD	Pts	W	D	L	GF	GA	GD	W	D	L	GF	GA	GD
25	10	5	10	48	38	+10	35	6	3	3	26	16	+10	4	2	7	22	22	0

Last updated: 9 February 2022.
Source: Jupiler Pro League

==== Results by round ====
Round	1	2	3	4	5	6	7	8	9	10	11	12	13	14	15	16	17	18	19	20	21	22	23	24	25	26	27	28	29	30	31	32	33	34
Ground	A	H	A	H	A	H	H	A	H	A	A	H	A	H	A	H	A	A	H	H	A	H	A	H	A	H	H	A	H	A	H	A	H	A
Result	D	L	W	W	L	W	D	W	W	L	L	L	W	D	L	L	D	L	W	D	W	W	L	W	L	W	W	L	W	D	L	L	W	W
Position	9	13	10	5	6	4	5	3	4	5	6	10	7	6	8	10	8	11	9	9	9	8	9	10	10	8	8	8	8	8	8	8	8	8

Source: Jupiler Pro League
A = Away; H = Home; W = Win; D = Draw; L = Loss

==== Matches ====
The league fixtures were announced on 8 June 2021.

23 July 2021 1	Standard Liège	1–1	Genk	Liège
20:45 CEST (UTC+2)	Sissako (yellow card) 32'; Laifis 69'	Report	Heynen (yellow card) 55'; Paintsil (yellow card) 88'; Bongonda 90+2'	Stadium: Stade Maurice Dufrasne; Attendance: 9,000; Referee: Lawrence Visser

30 July 2021 2	Genk	3–4	Oostende	Genk
20:45 CEST (UTC+2)	Heynen 20'; Bongonda 30', 60'	Report	Hendry (yellow card) 30'; Kvasina 32'; Gueye 49'; Ambrose 62'; Jäkel 79'	Stadium: Luminus Arena; Attendance: 5,069; Referee: Nathan Verboomen

7 August 2021 3	Kortrijk	1–2	Genk	Kortrijk
20:45 CEST (UTC+2)	Chevalier 18'	Report	Onuachu 52'; Muñoz 90+2'	Stadium: Guldensporen Stadion; Attendance: 2,800; Referee: Nicolas Laforge

14 August 2021 4	Genk	4–0	OH Leuven	Genk
20:45 CEST (UTC+2)	Bongonda 3'; Lucumí (yellow card) 49'; Onuachu 59'; Itō 77'; Thorstvedt 90+2'	Report	Özkacar (yellow card) 16'; Schrijvers (yellow card) 53'; Keita (yellow card) 63'; Dewaest (yellow card) 70'; Henry (yellow card) 71'	Stadium: Luminus Arena; Attendance: 10,147; Referee: Kevin Van Damme

29 August 2021 6	Genk	1–0	Anderlecht	Genk
18:30 CEST (UTC+2)	Muñoz (yellow card) 66'; Ugbo 87'	Report	Raman (yellow card) 42'; Harwood-Bellis (yellow card) 66'; Olsson (yellow card) 68'; Amuzu (yellow card) 84'; Sergio Gómez (yellow card) 90'	Stadium: Luminus Arena; Referee: Nicolas Laforge

12 September 2021 7	Genk	1–1	Union SG	Genk
21:00 CEST (UTC+2)	Lucumí (yellow card) 43'; Onuachu 74'	Report	Burgess (yellow card) 28'; Bager (red card) 72'; Undav 90+5'	Stadium: Luminus Arena; Attendance: 14,000; Referee: Erik Lambrechts

19 September 2021 8	Sint-Truiden	1–2	Genk	Sint-Truiden
13:30 CEST (UTC+2)				Stadium: Stayen

22 September 2021 5	Antwerp	4–2	Genk	Antwerp
20:45 CEST (UTC+2)	De Laet 27', (yellow card) 45' (yellow-red card) 84'; B. Verstraete 37'; Miyoshi 41'; Frey (yellow card) 44', (goal) 69'; Almeida (yellow card) 79'; Haroun (yellow card) 89'	Report	Onuachu 13', 80' (pen.), (yellow card) 56'; Muñoz (yellow card) 45+1'; Thorstvedt (yellow card) 72'	Stadium: Bosuilstadion; Attendance: 15,600; Referee: Bram Van Driessche

26 September 2021 9	Genk	3–0	RFC Seraing	Genk
21:00 CEST (UTC+2)				Stadium: Luminus Arena

3 October 2021 10	Eupen	3–2	Genk	Eupen
21:00 CEST (UTC+2)				Stadium: Kehrwegstadion

17 October 2021 11	Charleroi	2–0	Genk	Charleroi
18:30 CEST (UTC+2)				Stadium: Stade du Pays de Charleroi

24 October 2021 12	Genk	0–3	Gent	Genk
18:30 CEST (UTC+2)				Stadium: Luminus Arena

31 October 2021 13	Zulte Waregem	2–6	Genk	Waregem
13:30 CET (UTC+1)				Stadium: Regenboogstadion

7 November 2021 14	Genk	1–1	Cercle Brugge	Genk
21:00 CET (UTC+1)				Stadium: Luminus Arena

21 November 2021 15	Beerschot	2–0	Genk	Antwerp
21:00 CET (UTC+1)				Stadium: Olympic Stadium

28 November 2021 16	Genk	2–3	Club Brugge	Genk
13:30 CET (UTC+1)				Stadium: Luminus Arena

5 December 2021 17	Mechelen	1–1	Genk	Mechelen
21:00 CET (UTC+1)				Stadium: AFAS Stadion

12 December 2021 18	Gent	1–0	Genk	Ghent
18:30 CET (UTC+1)	De Sart 29'			Stadium: Ghelamco Arena

16 December 2021 19	Genk	4–2	Charleroi	Genk
21:00 CET (UTC+1)				Stadium: Luminus Arena

19 December 2021 20	Genk	1–1	Antwerp	Genk
18:30 CET (UTC+1)				Stadium: Luminus Arena

26 December 2021 21	Oostende	0–4	Genk	Ostend
21:00 CET (UTC+1)		Report	Ugbo 6'; Itō 12'; Muñoz 53'; Hrošovský 78'; Thorstvedt (red card) 83'	Stadium: Versluys Arena; Referee: Jan Boterberg

16 January 2022 22	Genk	4–1	Beerschot	Genk
21:00 CET (UTC+1)		Report		Stadium: Luminus Arena; Referee: Lothar D'hondt

23 January 2022 23	Union SG	2–1	Genk	Brussels
14:00 CET (UTC+1)	Nielsen 27'; Burgess (yellow card) 76'; Vanzier (yellow card) 84' (goal) 90+10' (pen.); Lazare (yellow card) 90+9'		Onuachu 77' (pen.)	Stadium: Stade Joseph Marien; Referee: Nathan Verboomen

6 February 2022 26	Genk	2–0	Zulte Waregem	Genk
21:00 CET (UTC+1)	Govea 36' (o.g.); Thorstvedt 47'	Report		Stadium: Luminus Arena; Attendance: 10,012; Referee: Jasper Vergoote

9 February 2022 25	OH Leuven	2–1	Genk	Leuven
21:00 CET (UTC+1)	Kaba 1', 90+3' (pen.)	Report	Sadick 19'; Heynen (red card) 14'	Stadium: Den Dreef; Attendance: 4,042; Referee: Bert Put

13 February 2022 27	Genk	2–0	Standard Liège	Genk
13:30 CET (UTC+1)	Bongonda 44'; Onuachu 53'	Report		Stadium: Luminus Arena; Attendance: 13,581; Referee: Nathan Verboomen

16 February 2022 24	Genk	4–1	Mechelen	Genk
21:00 CET (UTC+1)				Stadium: Luminus Arena

20 February 2022 28	Anderlecht	2–0	Genk	Anderlecht
18:30 CET (UTC+1)				Stadium: Constant Vanden Stock Stadium

27 February 2022 29	Genk	2–0	Kortrijk	Genk
16:00 CET (UTC+1)				Stadium: Luminus Arena

5 March 2022 30	Cercle Brugge	2–2	Genk	Bruges
16:15 CET (UTC+1)				Stadium: Jan Breydel Stadium

13 March 2022 31	Genk	0–1	Sint-Truiden	Genk
16:00 CET (UTC+1)				Stadium: Luminus Arena

20 March 2022 32	Club Brugge	3–1	Genk	Bruges
13:30 CET (UTC+1)				Stadium: Jan Breydel Stadium

3 April 2022 33	Genk	5–0	Eupen	Genk
21:00 CEST (UTC+2)		Report		Stadium: Luminus Arena; Attendance: 10,318; Referee: Alexandre Boucaut

10 April 2022 34	Seraing	0–2	Genk	Seraing
18:30 CEST (UTC+2)		Report		Stadium: Stade du Pairay; Attendance: 2,500; Referee: Arthur Denil

==== Play-Off II ====
Pos	Team	Pld	W	D	L	GF	GA	GD	Pts	Qualification or relegation	GNT	GNK	CHA	MEC
1	Gent	6	4	0	2	9	5	+4	43	Qualification for the Europa League play-off round (Note: Gent qualified for the Europa League play-off round as the 2021–22 Belgian Cup winners.)	—	0–1	1–2	1–0
2	Genk	6	3	2	1	10	8	+2	37		0–2	—	3–2	4–2
3	Charleroi	6	2	1	3	10	12	−2	34		1–3	2–2	—	3–2
4	Mechelen	6	1	1	4	6	10	−4	30		1–2	0–0	1–0	—

Source: Jupiler Pro League (in Dutch), Soccerway
Legend: Blue = home team win; Yellow = draw; Red = away team win.
Rules for classification: 1) Points; 2) Points without (possible) half points added due to rounding; 3) Regular season finishing position.

==== Results summary ====
Overall								Home						Away					
Pld	W	D	L	GF	GA	GD	Pts	W	D	L	GF	GA	GD	W	D	L	GF	GA	GD
6	3	2	1	10	8	+2	11	2	0	1	7	6	+1	1	2	0	3	2	+1

Last updated: 21 May 2022.
Source: Jupiler Pro League

==== Results by round ====
Round	1	2	3	4	5	6
Ground	A	H	A	H	H	A
Result	W	W	D	W	L	D
Position	1	2	2	2	2	2

Updated to match(es) played on 21 May 2022. Source: Jupiler Pro League
A = Away; H = Home; W = Win; D = Draw; L = Loss

==== Matches ====
24 April 2022 1	Gent	0–1	Genk	Ghent
16:00 CEST (UTC+2)	Odjidja-Ofoe (yellow card) 34' (yellow-red card) 35'; Lemajić (yellow card) 41'; Samoise (yellow card) 44'	Report	Bongonda (yellow card) 46'; Heynen (yellow card) 73'; Paintsil (yellow card) 86'; Németh 90+1'	Stadium: Ghelamco Arena; Attendance: 18,474; Referee: Nathan Verboomen

29 April 2022 2	Genk	4–2	Mechelen	Genk
20:45 CEST (UTC+2)		Report		Stadium: Cegeka Arena; Attendance: 14,021; Referee: Lawrence Visser

6 May 2022 3	Charleroi	2–2	Genk	Charleroi
20:45 CEST (UTC+2)		Report		Stadium: Stade du Pays de Charleroi; Attendance: 4,614; Referee: Lothar D'hondt

10 May 2022 4	Genk	3–2	Charleroi	Genk
21:00 CEST (UTC+2)		Report		Stadium: Cegeka Arena; Attendance: 10,000; Referee: Jasper Vergoote

15 May 2022 5	Genk	0–2	Gent	Genk
16:00 CEST (UTC+2)		Report	Tissoudali 29'; Odjidja-Ofoe 72'	Stadium: Luminus Arena; Attendance: 12,000; Referee: Nicolas Laforge

21 May 2022 6	Mechelen	0–0	Genk	Mechelen
20:45 CEST (UTC+2)	Van Hecke (yellow card) 31'; Souza (yellow card) 54'	Report		Stadium: Achter de Kazerne; Attendance: 11,278; Referee: Christof Dierick

=== Belgian Cup ===
27 October 2021 Sixth round	Sint-Eloois-Winkel	0–6	Genk	Sint-Eloois-Winkel
20:00 CEST (UTC+2)			Ugbo 34' (pen.), 80'; Arteaga 36', 38'; Paintsil 44'; Toma 87'	Stadium: Sportpark Terschueren

1 December 2021 Seventh round	Genk	3–3 (a.e.t.) (3–5 p)	Club Brugge	Genk
20:45 CET (UTC+1)	Thorstvedt 29'; Paintsil 45+2', 71'		Balanta 7'; De Ketelaere 69', 90'	Stadium: Cegeka Arena
	Penalties
	Hrošovský (penalty missed); Lucumí (penalty scored); Bongonda (penalty scored); Thorstvedt (penalty scored)		(penalty scored) Dost; (penalty scored) De Ketelaere; (penalty scored) Rits; (penalty scored) Ricca; (penalty scored) Lang

=== Belgian Super Cup ===
17 July 2021 Final	Club Brugge	3–2	Genk	Brugge
20:45 CEST (UTC+2)	Mitrović 45+3'; Lang 48' (pen.), (yellow card) 49'; Mata 50'; De Ketelaere (yellow card) 65'	Report	Bongonda 44'; Uronen 90+3'	Stadium: Jan Breydel Stadium; Attendance: 10,000; Referee: Jonathan Lardot

=== UEFA Champions League ===
==== Third qualifying round ====
3 August 2021 First leg	Genk (Belgium)	1–2	(Ukraine) Shakhtar Donetsk	Genk, Belgium
20:00 CEST (UTC+2)	Onuachu 39'; Muñoz (yellow card) 62'; Thorstvedt (yellow card) 69'	Report	Pedrinho (yellow card) 50'; Tetê 63' (pen.); Marlon (yellow card) 66'; Maycon (yellow card) 68'; Alan Patrick 81'	Stadium: Luminus Arena; Attendance: 5,096; Referee: Anastasios Sidiropoulos (Greece)

10 August 2021 Second leg	Shakhtar Donetsk (Ukraine)	2–1 (4–2 agg.)	(Belgium) Genk	Kyiv, Ukraine
20:30 EEST (UTC+3)	Traoré 27'; Sudakov (yellow card) 42'; Trubin (yellow card) 71'; Marcos Antônio 76'; Vitão (yellow card) 90+2'	Report	Lucumí (yellow card) 45+2'; Dessers 90'; Muñoz (yellow card) 90+5'	Stadium: NSC Olimpiyskiy; Attendance: 20,594; Referee: Benoît Bastien (France)

=== UEFA Europa League ===
==== Group stage ====
The draw for the group stage was held on 27 August 2021.

Pos	Team	Pld	W	D	L	GF	GA	GD	Pts	Qualification	WHU	DZA	RWI	GNK
1	(England) West Ham United	6	4	1	1	11	3	+8	13	Advance to round of 16	—	0–1	2–0	3–0
2	(Croatia) Dinamo Zagreb	6	3	1	2	9	6	+3	10	Advance to knockout round play-offs	0–2	—	3–1	1–1
3	(Austria) Rapid Wien	6	2	0	4	4	9	−5	6	Transfer to Europa Conference League	0–2	2–1	—	0–1
4	(Belgium) Genk	6	1	2	3	4	10	−6	5		2–2	0–3	0–1	—

Source: UEFA
Rules for classification: Group stage tiebreakers

16 September 2021 1	Rapid Wien (Austria)	0–1	(Belgium) Genk	Vienna, Austria
18:45 CEST (UTC+2)		Report	Onuachu 90+2'	Stadium: Allianz Stadion; Attendance: 18,400; Referee: Kristo Tohver (Estonia)

30 September 2021 2	Genk (Belgium)	0–3	(Croatia) Dinamo Zagreb	Genk, Belgium
21:00 CEST (UTC+2)	Heynen (yellow card) 14'; Thorstvedt (yellow card) 30'; Muñoz (red card) 65'	Report	Ivanušec 10'; Petković 45+3' (pen.), 67' (pen.)	Stadium: Luminus Arena; Attendance: 11,262; Referee: Mattias Gestranius (Finland)

21 October 2021 3	West Ham United (England)	3–0	(Belgium) Genk	Stratford, England
20:00 BST (UTC+1)	Dawson 45+1'; Diop 57'; Bowen 59'	Report		Stadium: London Stadium; Attendance: 45,980; Referee: Donatas Rumšas (Lithuania)

4 November 2021 4	Genk (Belgium)	2–2	(England) West Ham United	Genk, Belgium
17:45 CET (UTC+1)	Paintsil 5', (yellow card) 69'; Thorstvedt (yellow card) 55'; Muñoz (yellow card) 69'; Arteaga (yellow card) 71'; Souček 88' (o.g.)	Report	Rice (yellow card) 15'; Benrahma 59', 82'; Dawson (yellow card) 67'	Stadium: Luminus Arena; Attendance: 12,239; Referee: Aleksandar Stavrev (North Macedonia)

25 November 2021 5	Dinamo Zagreb (Croatia)	1–1	(Belgium) Genk	Zagreb, Croatia
18:45 CET (UTC+1)	Menalo 35'	Report	Ugbo 45+1'	Stadium: Stadion Maksimir; Attendance: 6,892; Referee: Glenn Nyberg (Sweden)

9 December 2021 6	Genk (Belgium)	0–1	(Austria) Rapid Wien	Genk, Belgium
21:00 CET (UTC+1)		Report	Ljubičić 29'	Stadium: Luminus Arena; Attendance: 10,018; Referee: Tiago Martins (Portugal)

== Statistics ==
=== Squad appearances and goals ===
Last updated on 21 May 2022.

No.	Pos	Nat	Player	Total		Belgian Division		Belgian Cup		Super Cup		UEFA Champions League		UEFA Europa League	
No.	Pos	Nat	Player	Apps	Goals	Apps	Goals	Apps	Goals	Apps	Goals	Apps	Goals	Apps	Goals
Goalkeepers
26	GK	(Belgium) BEL	Maarten Vandevoordt	48	0	38	0	0+1	0	1	0	2	0	6	0
30	GK	(Belgium) BEL	Vic Chambaere	0	0	0	0	0	0	0	0	0	0	0	0
40	GK	(Belgium) BEL	Tobe Leysen	4	0	2	0	2	0	0	0	0	0	0	0
Defenders
2	DF	(United States) USA	Mark McKenzie	28	0	19+3	0	2	0	1	0	0	0	2+1	0
3	DF	(Spain) ESP	Mujaid Sadick	33	2	23+2	2	1	0	1	0	1+1	0	3+1	0
5	DF	(Mexico) MEX	Gerardo Arteaga	42	2	28+4	0	2	2	0	0	2	0	6	0
6	DF	(Norway) NOR	Simen Juklerød	13	0	11	0	0	0	1	0	0	0	0+1	0
23	DF	(Colombia) COL	Daniel Muñoz	36	3	25+4	3	1+1	0	0	0	2	0	3	0
25	DF	(Belgium) BEL	Tuur Rommens	2	0	0+1	0	0+1	0	0	0	0	0	0	0
33	DF	(Colombia) COL	Jhon Lucumí	37	1	24+5	1	1	0	0	0	2	0	4+1	0
46	DF	(Colombia) COL	Carlos Cuesta	26	1	15+6	1	0	0	0	0	1	0	3+1	0
77	DF	(Ecuador) ECU	Angelo Preciado	31	0	14+9	0	1+1	0	1	0	0	0	3+2	0
Midfielders
4	MF	(Ivory Coast) CIV	Aziz Ouattara Mohammed	14	0	9+5	0	0	0	0	0	0	0	0	0
8	MF	(Belgium) BEL	Bryan Heynen	47	5	36+2	5	1	0	1	0	2	0	5	0
11	MF	(Belgium) BEL	Mike Trésor	37	0	12+18	0	0+1	0	1	0	1+1	0	0+3	0
14	MF	(Switzerland) SUI	Bastien Toma	10	1	3+2	0	1+1	1	1	0	0	0	1+1	0
15	MF	(Belgium) BEL	Jay-Dee Geusens	1	0	0+1	0	0	0	0	0	0	0	0	0
17	MF	(Slovakia) SVK	Patrik Hrošovský	40	5	26+6	5	1	0	0+1	0	2	0	4	0
20	DF	(Belgium) BEL	Bilal El Khannous	2	0	0+1	0	1	0	0	0	0	0	0	0
24	MF	(Belgium) BEL	Luca Oyen	31	2	8+18	2	1+1	0	0	0	0	0	0+3	0
42	MF	(Norway) NOR	Kristian Thorstvedt	45	4	27+8	3	2	1	0	0	1+1	0	5+1	0
Forwards
7	FW	(Japan) JPN	Junya Itō	49	8	37+2	8	1	0	1	0	2	0	6	0
10	FW	(Belgium) BEL	Theo Bongonda	43	13	23+11	12	1	0	1	1	2	0	4+1	0
18	FW	(Nigeria) NGR	Paul Onuachu	43	23	30+5	21	0	0	1	0	2	1	4+1	1
21	FW	(Canada) CAN	Iké Ugbo	25	6	6+12	3	1+1	2	0	0	0	0	2+3	1
28	FW	(Ghana) GHA	Joseph Paintsil	36	7	13+15	3	2	3	0+1	0	0+1	0	3+1	1
35	MF	(Hungary) HUN	András Németh	5	2	0+5	2	0	0	0	0	0	0	0	0
38	FW	(Tanzania) TAN	Kelvin John	1	0	0+1	0	0	0	0	0	0	0	0	0
Players who have made an appearance this season but have left the club
20	MF	(Netherlands) NED	Carel Eiting	18	0	10+2	0	0	0	0+1	0	0+2	0	2+1	0
21	DF	(Finland) FIN	Jere Uronen	1	1	0	0	0	0	0+1	1	0	0	0	0
38	MF	(Ivory Coast) CIV	Eboue Kouassi	0	0	0	0	0	0	0	0	0	0	0	0
80	MF	(Belgium) BEL	Pierre Dwomoh	0	0	0	0	0	0	0	0	0	0	0	0
9	FW	(Nigeria) NGR	Cyriel Dessers	6	1	1+2	0	0	0	0+1	0	0+2	1	0	0
22	FW	(Belgium) BEL	Bryan Limbombe	0	0	0	0	0	0	0	0	0	0	0	0
	DF	(Brazil) BRA	Neto Borges	0	0	0	0	0	0	0	0	0	0	0	0
	FW	(Nigeria) NGR	Stephen Odey	0	0	0	0	0	0	0	0	0	0	0	0

=== Goalscorers ===
As of 3 August 2021

Rank	No.	Pos.	Nat.	Name	Pro League	Belgian Cup	Belgian Super Cup	Champions League	Total
1	10	FW	(Belgium)	Théo Bongonda	3	0	1	0	4
2	18	FW	(Nigeria)	Paul Onuachu	0	0	0	1	1
2	21	DF	(Finland)	Jere Uronen	0	0	1	0	1
2	28	MF	(Belgium)	Bryan Heynen	1	0	0	0	1
Own goal					0	0	0	0	0
Totals					4	0	2	1	7
