= Luca Oyen =

Belgian footballer (born 2003)

Personal information
- Date of birth: 14 March 2003 (age 23)
- Place of birth: Nottingham, England
- Height: 1.72 m (5 ft 8 in)
- Position: Midfielder

Team information
- Current team: Heerenveen
- Number: 11

Youth career
- 2008–2009: Genk VV
- 2009–2020: Genk

Senior career*
Years	Team	Apps	(Gls)
2020–2026	Genk	69	(3)
2024–2026	Jong Genk	25	(6)
2026–	Heerenveen	14	(1)

International career
2018	Belgium U15	5	(0)
2018–2019	Belgium U16	11	(2)
2019–2020	Belgium U17	7	(2)
2020–2022	Belgium U19	11	(5)
2022–2023	Belgium U21	4	(0)
- * Club domestic league appearances and goals as of 19 May 2026

Luca Oyen (born 14 March 2003) is a Belgian professional footballer who plays as a midfielder for Eredivisie club Heerenveen.

== Early life ==
Born in Nottingham, England, to Belgian parents while his father, Davy, was playing for Nottingham Forest, Oyen moved to Belgium at a young age.

== Club career ==
Oyen made his professional debut with Genk in a 2–1 Belgian First Division A win over Zulte Waregem. On 16 December 2021, he scored his first goal for Genk in a 4–2 win over Charleroi.

On 6 January 2026, Oyen signed a three-and-a-half-year contract with Dutch club Heerenveen.

== International career ==
Oyen has represented Belgium from under‑15 through to under‑21 level.

== Personal life ==
Oyen is the son of retired Belgian international footballer Davy Oyen.

== Career statistics ==
As of match played 14 February 2025

Appearances and goals by club, season and competition
Club	Season	League			Cup		Europe		Other		Total	
Club	Season	Division	Apps	Goals	Apps	Goals	Apps	Goals	Apps	Goals	Apps	Goals
Genk	2020–21	Belgian Pro League	20	0	1	0	0	0	—		21	0
Genk	2021–22	Belgian Pro League	26	2	2	0	3 (Note: Appearances in UEFA Europa League)	0	0	0	31	2
Genk	2022–23	Belgian Pro League	6	0	0	0	0	0	—		6	0
Genk	2023–24	Belgian Pro League	15	1	2	0	5 (Note: One appearance in UEFA Europa League, four appearances in UEFA Conference League)	0	—		22	1
Genk	2024–25	Belgian Pro League	2	0	1	0	—		—		3	0
Career total			69	3	6	0	8	0	0	0	83	3

== Honours ==
Genk

- Belgian Cup: 2020–21
