= Gerardo Arteaga =

Mexican footballer (born 1998)

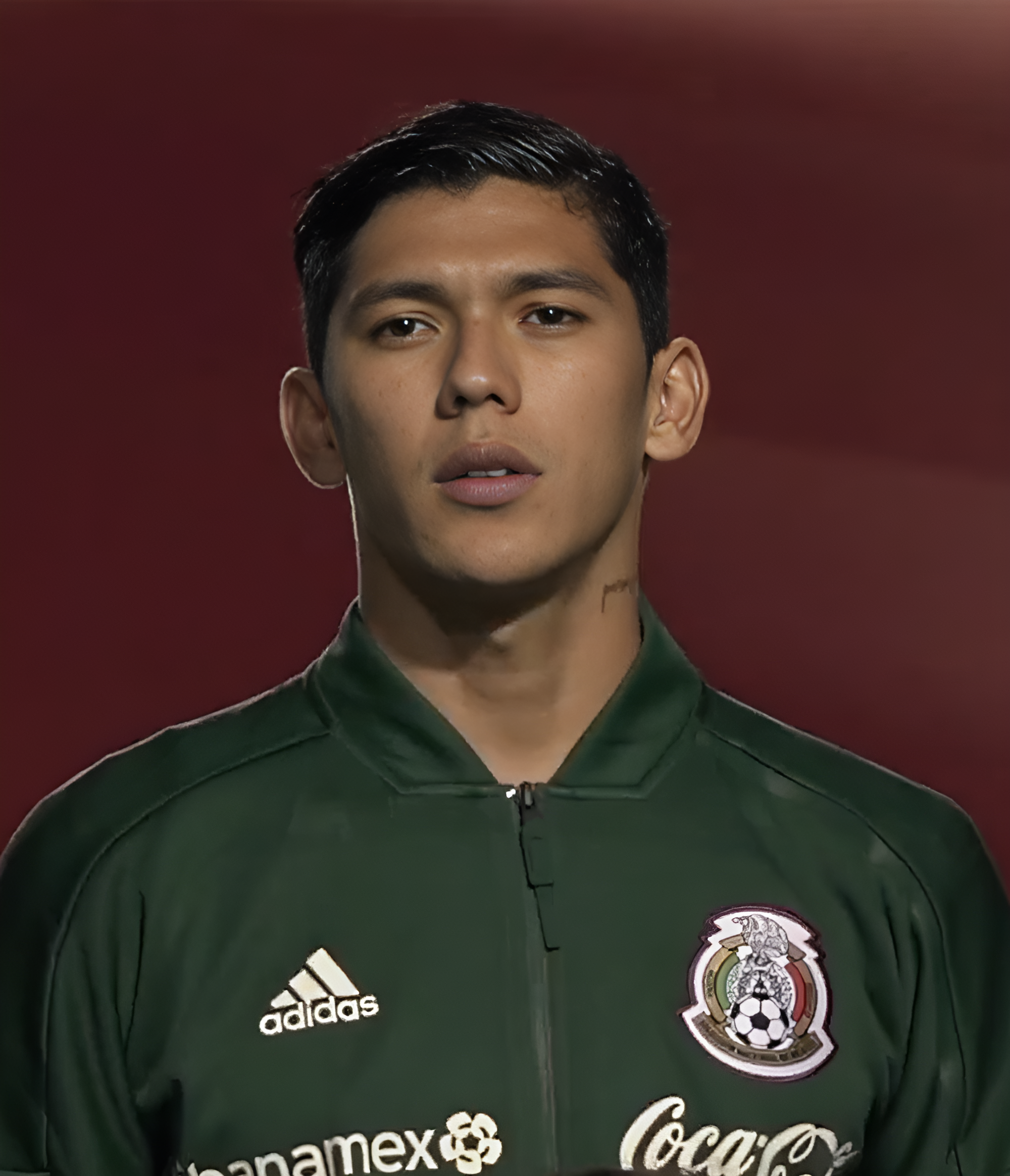
- Arteaga with Mexico in 2018

Personal information
- Full name: Gerardo Daniel Arteaga Zamora
- Date of birth: 7 September 1998 (age 28)
- Place of birth: Zapopan, Jalisco, Mexico
- Height: 1.73 m (5 ft 8 in)
- Position: Left-back

Team information
- Current team: Monterrey
- Number: 3

Youth career
- 2013–2016: Santos Laguna

Senior career*
Years	Team	Apps	(Gls)
2016–2020	Santos Laguna	89	(1)
2020–2024	Genk	110	(3)
2024–	Monterrey	105	(6)

International career^{‡}
2018	Mexico U21	5	(0)
2019–2021	Mexico U23	4	(0)
2018–	Mexico	27	(2)
Medal record
Men's football
Representing Mexico
CONCACAF Gold Cup
Winner	2023 United States–Canada	Team
CONCACAF Nations League
Runner-up	2024 United States
Runner-up	2021 United States
Toulon Tournament
Third place	2019 France	Team
Runner-up	2018 France	Team
- * Club domestic league appearances and goals as of 21 November 2026 ‡ National team caps and goals as of 30 June 2024

Gerardo Daniel Arteaga Zamora (born 7 September 1998) is a Mexican professional footballer who plays left-back for Liga MX club Monterrey and the Mexico national team.

== Club career ==
=== Santos Laguna ===
Arteaga joined Santos Laguna's youth academy in 2013. On 1 October 2016, under manager José Manuel de la Torre, he made his professional debut in Liga MX against Querétaro ending in a 1–1 draw.

=== Genk ===
On 26 July 2020, Santos Laguna announced the departure of Arteaga to Belgian club Genk for a reported fee of €3.5 million on a 5-year contract. Arteaga made his debut with the club on 24 August against Westerlo in a 2–2 draw.

On 25 April 2021, Arteaga played the entirety of the Belgian Cup final in a 2–1 victory over Standard Liège.

=== Monterrey ===
On 29 January 2024, Arteaga returned to Mexico and joined Monterrey on a four-year deal.

== International career ==
=== Youth ===
Arteaga was included in the final roster that participated at the 2018 Toulon Tournament. He would go on to appear in all five matches, as Mexico would go to the final against England, where Mexico lost 2–1.

Arteaga was called up by Jaime Lozano to participate with the under-22 team at the 2019 Toulon Tournament, where Mexico won third place at the tournament.

=== Senior ===
In September 2018, he was called up by interim manager Ricardo Ferretti for September friendlies against Uruguay and the United States. Arteaga made his senior national team debut against the United States on 11 September 2018, where Mexico lost 0–1. On 27 September 2022, he scored his first international goal during a 2–3 loss against Colombia.

In October 2022, Arteaga was named in Mexico's preliminary 31-man squad for the 2022 FIFA World Cup, and in November, he was ultimately included in the final 26-man roster, but did not receive any minutes on the field during the tournament.

In June 2024, Arteaga was called up by Jaime Lozano to the Copa America 2024 where he scored a goal in Mexico's opening match day against Jamaica, helping Mexico secure a win.

== Career statistics ==
=== Club ===
As of match played on 21 November 2026

Appearances and goals by club, season and competition
Club	Season	League			Cup (Note: Includes Copa MX, Belgian Cup)		Continental		Global		Other		Total	
Club	Season	Division	Apps	Goals	Apps	Goals	Apps	Goals	Apps	Goals	Apps	Goals	Apps	Goals
Santos Laguna	2016–17	Liga MX	16	0	2	0	—		—		—		18	0
Santos Laguna	2017–18	Liga MX	14	0	7	0	—		—		1 (Note: Appearance in Campeón de Campeones)	0	22	0
Santos Laguna	2018–19	Liga MX	28	0	4	0	—		—		—		32	0
Santos Laguna	2019–20	Liga MX	30	1	3	0	2 (Note: Appearances in CONCACAF Champions Cup)	0	—		—		35	1
Santos Laguna	2020–21	Liga MX	1	0	—		—		—		—		1	0
Santos Laguna	Total		89	1	16	0	2	0	—		1	0	108	1
Genk	2020–21	Belgian Pro League	25	1	3	0	—		—		—		28	1
Genk	2021–22	Belgian Pro League	32	0	2	2	8 (Note: Two appearances in UEFA Champions League, six appearances in UEFA Europa League)	0	—		—		42	2
Genk	2022–23	Belgian Pro League	38	2	2	0	—		—		—		40	2
Genk	2023–24	Belgian Pro League	15	0	—		7 (Note: One appearance in UEFA Champions League, one appearance in UEFA Europa League, five appearances in UEFA Conference League)	0	—		—		22	0
Genk	Total		110	3	7	2	15	0	—		—		132	5
Monterrey	2023–24	Liga MX	15	3	—		8	0	—		—		23	3
Monterrey	2024–25	Liga MX	40	2	—		2	0	—		2 (Note: Appearances in Leagues Cup)	0	44	2
Monterrey	2025–26	Liga MX	35	1	—		1	0	4 (Note: Appearances in FIFA Club World Cup)	0	2	0	42	1
Monterrey	2026–27	Liga MX	15	0	—		—		—		5	0	20	0
Monterrey	Total		105	5	—		11	0	4	0	9	0	129	5
Career total			304	9	23	2	28	0	4	0	10	0	369	11

=== International ===
As of match played on 30 June 2024

Appearances and goals by national team and year
National team	Year	Apps	Goals
Mexico	2018	4	0
Mexico	2019	1	0
Mexico	2021	5	0
Mexico	2022	7	1
Mexico	2023	4	0
Mexico	2024	6	1
Total		27	2

Scores and results list Mexico's goal tally first, score column indicates score after each Arteaga goal.

List of international goals scored by Gerardo Arteaga
No.	Date	Venue	Opponent	Score	Result	Competition
1	27 September 2022	Levi's Stadium, Santa Clara, United States	Colombia	2–0	2–3	Friendly
2	22 June 2024	NRG Stadium, Houston, United States	Jamaica	1–0	1–0	2024 Copa América

== Honours ==
Santos Laguna

- Liga MX: Clausura 2018

Genk

- Belgian Cup: 2020–21

Mexico

- CONCACAF Gold Cup: 2023

Individual

- Liga MX Best XI: Clausura 2024
