= Kai-David Bösing =

German footballer (born 1994)

Personal information
- Date of birth: 7 March 1994 (age 32)
- Place of birth: Aachen, Germany
- Height: 1.72 m (5 ft 8 in)
- Position: Midfielder

Team information
- Current team: VfL Vichttal

Youth career
- –2012: Roda JC

Senior career*
Years	Team	Apps	(Gls)
2012–2015	Roda JC II	50	(6)
2014–2015	Roda JC	0	(0)
2015–2017	Fortuna Köln	16	(0)
2017–2021	Alemannia Aachen	70	(9)
2021–2022	MVV	13	(0)
2022–2023	SV Eintracht Hohkeppel	12	(0)
2023–	VfL Vichttal	10	(0)
- * Club domestic league appearances and goals as of 03:47, 4 July 2024 (UTC)

Kai-David Bösing (born 7 March 1994) is a German professional footballer who plays as midfielder for Mittelrheinliga club VfL Vichttal.

== Career ==
In his youth, Bösing played at Roda JC in the Netherlands. In 2012, he moved from the youth academy to the second team. In the 2014–15 season, Bösing was included in the first team squad, which played in the Dutch second league, the Eerste Divisie. However, he never made an appearance.

In the summer of 2015 he joined Fortuna Köln. He made his 3. Liga debut on 15 August 2015, matchday 3. He came on as a substitute in the 68th minute for Kusi Kwame in the 2–4 defeat against Hansa Rostock.

For the 2022–23 season, Bösing joined fifth-tier Mittelrheinliga club Eintracht Hohkeppel. The following year, he joined fellow Mittelrheinliga club VfL Vichttal.
