= Bastien Toma =

Swiss footballer (born 1999)

Personal information
- Date of birth: 24 June 1999 (age 27)
- Place of birth: Sion, Switzerland
- Height: 1.72 m (5 ft 8 in)
- Position: Midfielder

Team information
- Current team: Yverdon-Sport
- Number: 24

Youth career
- 2008–2017: Sion

Senior career*
| Years | Team | Apps | (Gls) |
| 2016–2017 | Sion II | 24 | (1) |
| 2017–2019 | Sion | 80 | (6) |
| 2020–2023 | Genk | 24 | (2) |
| 2022 | → St. Gallen (loan) | 16 | (1) |
| 2022–2023 | → Paços de Ferreira (loan) | 12 | (0) |
| 2023 | Jong Genk | 11 | (3) |
| 2023–2025 | St. Gallen | 61 | (3) |
| 2025–2026 | ŁKS Łódź | 20 | (1) |
| 2026– | Yverdon-Sport | 1 | (0) |

International career
| 2014 | Switzerland U15 | 1 | (0) |
| 2015 | Switzerland U16 | 4 | (0) |
| 2015–2016 | Switzerland U17 | 7 | (0) |
| 2016–2017 | Switzerland U18 | 3 | (1) |
| 2017–2018 | Switzerland U19 | 7 | (0) |
| 2018–2021 | Switzerland U21 | 17 | (2) |
- * Club domestic league appearances and goals as of 20 September 2026

Bastien Toma (born 24 June 1999) is a Swiss professional footballer who plays as a midfielder for Swiss Challenge League club Yverdon-Sport. In Switzerland, he was known for his time at Sion and St. Gallen.

== Early life ==
Toma was born in Sion, Switzerland to Kosovan parents from Kabash, Viti.

== Club career ==
=== Sion ===
In 2015 Toma signed his first professional contract with Swiss Super League side Sion after agreeing to a five-year deal. On 4 November 2017, he made his debut in a 1–1 home draw against Zurich after being named in the starting line-up.

=== Paços de Ferreira ===
On 31 August 2022, Toma was loaned to Paços de Ferreira in Portugal, with an option to buy.

=== Return to Genk ===
On 31 January 2023, Toma was recalled from loan and assigned to the reserve squad Jong Genk which plays in the second-tier Challenger Pro League.

=== Return to St. Gallen ===
On 7 September 2023, Toma signed a two-year contract with St. Gallen. On 3 September 2025, his contract with St. Gallen was terminated by mutual consent. He made a total 94 appearances for St. Gallen across four seasons, in which he scored six goals and supplied twelve assists.

=== ŁKS Łódź ===
On 15 September 2025, Toma signed with Polish second tier side ŁKS Łódź on a one-year deal with an option to extend. He was released at the end of the 2025–26 season.

== International career ==
Toma has played for various Swiss junior teams from 2014 to 2021. He made his debut for the Swiss under-21s on 25 April 2018, coming on as a substitute in the closing stages of a 2–1 friendly win against France. On 22 March 2019, He scored his first goal at the under-21 level in a 4–1 friendly win over Croatia.

On 22 September 2025, in an interview for Telegrafi, Toma stated that he would be open to representing the Kosovo national team.

== Career statistics ==
As of match played 18 May 2026

Appearances and goals by club, season and competition
| Club | Season | League | | | National cup (Note: Includes Swiss Cup, Belgian Cup, Taça de Portugal, Polish Cup) | | Europe | | Other | | Total | |
| Club | Season | Division | Apps | Goals | Apps | Goals | Apps | Goals | Apps | Goals | Apps | Goals |
|---|---|---|---|---|---|---|---|---|---|---|---|---|
| Sion II | 2016–17 | Swiss Promotion League | 15 | 0 | — | | — | | — | | 15 | 0 |
| Sion II | 2017–18 | Swiss Promotion League | 9 | 1 | — | | — | | — | | 9 | 1 |
| Sion II | Total | | 24 | 1 | — | | — | | — | | 24 | 1 |
| Sion | 2017–18 | Swiss Super League | 21 | 1 | 0 | 0 | 1 (Note: Appearance(s) in UEFA Europa League) | 0 | — | | 22 | 1 |
| Sion | 2018–19 | Swiss Super League | 32 | 3 | 3 | 0 | 0 | 0 | — | | 35 | 3 |
| Sion | 2019–20 | Swiss Super League | 27 | 2 | 4 | 1 | 0 | 0 | — | | 31 | 3 |
| Sion | Total | | 80 | 6 | 7 | 1 | 1 | 0 | — | | 88 | 7 |
| Genk | 2020–21 | Belgian Pro League | 19 | 2 | 2 | 0 | — | | — | | 21 | 2 |
| Genk | 2021–22 | Belgian Pro League | 5 | 0 | 2 | 1 | 2 | 0 | 1 (Note: Appearance in Belgian Super Cup) | 0 | 10 | 1 |
| Genk | Total | | 24 | 2 | 4 | 1 | 2 | 0 | 1 | 0 | 31 | 3 |
| St. Gallen (loan) | 2021–22 | Swiss Super League | 16 | 1 | 3 | 0 | — | | — | | 19 | 1 |
| Paços de Ferreira | 2022–23 | Liga Portugal | 12 | 0 | 1 | 0 | — | | 3 (Note: Appearances in Taça da Liga) | 0 | 16 | 0 |
| Jong Genk | 2022–23 | Challenger Pro League | 11 | 3 | — | | — | | — | | 11 | 3 |
| St. Gallen | 2023–24 | Swiss Super League | 27 | 2 | 0 | 0 | — | | — | | 27 | 2 |
| St. Gallen | 2024–25 | Swiss Super League | 34 | 1 | 3 | 0 | 11 (Note: Appearances in UEFA Conference League) | 2 | — | | 48 | 3 |
| St. Gallen | Total | | 61 | 3 | 3 | 0 | 11 | 2 | 0 | 0 | 75 | 5 |
| ŁKS Łódź | 2025–26 | I liga | 20 | 1 | 2 | 1 | — | | — | | 22 | 2 |
| Career total | | | 248 | 17 | 20 | 3 | 14 | 2 | 4 | 0 | 286 | 22 |

== Honours ==
Genk

- Belgian Cup: 2020–21
