= Junya Itō =

Japanese footballer (born 1993)

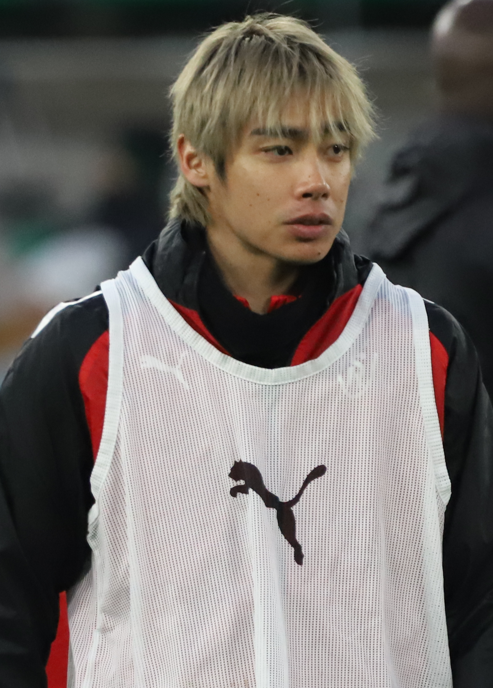
- Itō with Reims in 2025

Personal information
- Full name: Junya Itō
- Date of birth: 9 March 1993 (age 33)
- Place of birth: Yokosuka, Japan
- Height: 1.76 m (5 ft 9 in)
- Positions: Winger; forward

Team information
- Current team: Genk
- Number: 10

Youth career
- 1999–2004: Kamoi SC
- 2005–2007: Yokosuka Seagulls
- 2008–2010: Zuyo High School

College career
Years	Team	Apps	(Gls)
2011–2014	Kanagawa University		

Senior career*
Years	Team	Apps	(Gls)
2015	Ventforet Kofu	30	(4)
2016–2020	Kashiwa Reysol	101	(19)
2019–2020	→ Genk (loan)	42	(8)
2020–2022	Genk	78	(19)
2022–2025	Reims	99	(13)
2025–	Genk	37	(7)

International career^{‡}
2017–	Japan	78	(16)
Medal record
Representing Japan
AFC Asian Cup
Silver medal – second place	2019 United Arab Emirates
- * Club domestic league appearances and goals as of 25 October 2026 ‡ National team caps and goals as of 14 November 2026

Junya Itō (伊東 純也, Itō Jun'ya; born 9 March 1993) is a Japanese professional footballer who plays as a winger or a forward for the Belgian Pro League team Genk and the Japan national team.

== Club career ==
=== Early club career ===
After attending Kanagawa University for four years, Itō first became a Special Designated Player for Ventforet Kofu, and obtained a new contract with the J1 League side. His first professional season attracted attention from Chiba-based Kashiwa Reysol, which signed him in January 2016.

On 31 January 2019, Itō moved from Kashiwa Reysol to Genk on a one-year loan. On 18 September, he made his Champions League debut as a starter in the group stage match against Red Bull Salzburg. On 30 March 2020, Itō signed permanently with Genk on a three-year contract.

=== Stade Reims and return to Genk ===
On 29 July 2022, Itō joined Ligue 1 club Reims. On 23 October, he scored the winner in a 2–1 victory against Auxerre. In the 2023–24 Ligue 1 opening game on 12 August 2023, Itō scored a stunning opening goal against Marseille, but Reims eventually lost 2–1. In August 2025, following his club's relegation from Ligue 1 in the 2024–25 season, Itō returned to Genk and signed a three-year contract.

== International career ==
Itō made his Japan national team debut in 2017. He was selected for Hajime Moriyasu's final World Cup squad in October 2022.

On 15 May 2026, Itō was selected in the 26-man squad for the 2026 FIFA World Cup.

== Controversies ==
On 31 January 2024, Shukan Shincho reported that police had launched an investigation into Itō following a criminal complaint filed by two women alleging that he had engaged in sexual misconduct with them while they were intoxicated at a hotel in Osaka without their consent after a match for Japan against Peru in June 2023.

In response to this report, the Japan Football Association decided on February 1 to withdraw Ito from the ongoing 2023 AFC Asian Cup after considering Ito's physical and mental condition.

On 1 February, Itō filed a criminal complaint against the two women with the Osaka Prefectural Police for filing false complaints. On 19 February, he filed a lawsuit against the two women at the Osaka District Court, claiming that their sponsorship contracts were terminated due to false complaints and demanding 200 million yen in damages.

The case was transferred to the Tokyo District Court in May and both Itō and the women were referred to prosecutors in July. On 9 August, prosecutors dropped both charges against Ito and Ito's countersuit on his accusers, citing lack of evidence.

== Career statistics ==
=== Club ===
As of match played 25 October 2026

Appearances and goals by club, season and competition
Club	Season	League			National cup		League cup		Continental		Other		Total	
Club	Season	Division	Apps	Goals	Apps	Goals	Apps	Goals	Apps	Goals	Apps	Goals	Apps	Goals
Ventforet Kofu	2015	J1 League	30	4	2	0	6	0	—		—		38	4
Kashiwa Reysol	2016	J1 League	33	7	2	0	6	0	—		—		41	7
Kashiwa Reysol	2017	J1 League	34	6	4	0	4	0	—		—		42	6
Kashiwa Reysol	2018	J1 League	34	6	1	1	0	0	6 (Note: Appearances in AFC Champions League)	2	—		41	9
Kashiwa Reysol	Total		101	19	7	1	10	0	6	2	—		124	22
Genk (loan)	2018–19	Belgian Pro League	13	3	0	0	—		1 (Note: Appearances in UEFA Europa League)	0	—		14	3
Genk (loan)	2019–20	Belgian Pro League	29	5	2	1	—		6 (Note: Appearances in UEFA Champions League)	0	1 (Note: Appearance in Belgian Super Cup)	0	38	6
Genk (loan)	Total		42	8	2	1	—		6	0	1	0	52	9
Genk	2020–21	Belgian Pro League	38	11	4	1	—		—		—		42	12
Genk	2021–22	Belgian Pro League	39	8	1	0	—		8 (Note: Two appearances in UEFA Champions League, six appearances in UEFA Europa League)	0	1	0	49	8
Genk	2022–23	Belgian Pro League	1	0	—		—		—		—		1	0
Genk	Total		78	19	5	1	—		8	0	1	0	92	20
Reims	2022–23	Ligue 1	35	6	1	0	—		—		—		36	6
Reims	2023–24	Ligue 1	31	3	0	0	—		—		—		31	3
Reims	2024–25	Ligue 1	33	4	5	0	—		—		1 (Note: Appearance in Ligue 1 relegation/promotion play-offs)	0	39	4
Reims	Total		99	13	6	0	—		—		1	0	106	13
Genk	2025–26	Belgian Pro League	28	6	0	0	—		8	1	—		36	7
Genk	2026–27	Belgian Pro League	9	2	1	0	—		—		—		10	2
Genk	Total		38	8	1	0	—		8	1	—		46	9
Career total			387	70	23	3	16	0	29	3	3	0	458	77

=== International ===
As of match played 14 November 2026

Appearances and goals by national team and year
National team	Year	Apps	Goals
Japan	2017	3	0
Japan	2018	4	2
Japan	2019	10	0
Japan	2020	3	0
Japan	2021	9	5
Japan	2022	13	2
Japan	2023	8	4
Japan	2024	10	1
Japan	2025	6	0
Japan	2026	12	2
Total		78	16

Scores and results list Japan's goal tally first, score column indicates score after each Itō goal.

List of international goals scored by Junya Itō
No.	Date	Venue	Cap	Opponent	Score	Result	Competition
1	11 September 2018	Panasonic Stadium Suita, Suita, Japan	4	Costa Rica	3–0	3–0	2018 Kirin Challenge Cup
2	12 October 2018	Denka Big Swan Stadium, Niigata, Japan	5	Panama	2–0	3–0	2018 Kirin Challenge Cup
3	30 March 2021	Fukuda Denshi Arena, Chiba, Japan	22	Mongolia	8–0	14–0	2022 FIFA World Cup qualification
4	30 March 2021	Fukuda Denshi Arena, Chiba, Japan	22	Mongolia	10–0	14–0	2022 FIFA World Cup qualification
5	11 June 2021	Noevir Stadium Kobe, Kobe, Japan	24	Serbia	1–0	1–0	Friendly
6	11 November 2021	Mỹ Đình National Stadium, Hanoi, Vietnam	28	Vietnam	1–0	1–0	2022 FIFA World Cup qualification
7	16 November 2021	Sultan Qaboos Sports Complex, Muscat, Oman	29	Oman	1–0	1–0	2022 FIFA World Cup qualification
8	27 January 2022	Saitama Stadium 2002, Saitama, Japan	30	China	2–0	2–0	2022 FIFA World Cup qualification
9	1 February 2022	Saitama Stadium 2002, Saitama, Japan	31	Saudi Arabia	2–0	2–0	2022 FIFA World Cup qualification
10	20 June 2023	Panasonic Stadium Suita, Suita, Japan	45	Peru	3–0	4–1	2023 Kirin Challenge Cup
11	9 September 2023	Volkswagen Arena, Wolfsburg, Germany	46	Germany	1–0	4–1	Friendly
12	12 September 2023	Cegeka Arena, Genk, Belgium	47	Turkey	4–2	4–2	2023 Kirin Challenge Cup
13	17 October 2023	Noevir Stadium Kobe, Kobe, Japan	49	Tunisia	2–0	2–0	2023 Kirin Challenge Cup
14	5 September 2024	Saitama Stadium 2002, Saitama, Japan	55	China	5–0	7–0	2026 FIFA World Cup qualification
15	28 March 2026	Hampden Park, Glasgow, Scotland	67	Scotland	1–0	1–0	Kirin World Challenge 2026
16	20 June 2026	Estadio BBVA, Guadalupe, Mexico	71	Tunisia	3–0	4–0	2026 FIFA World Cup

== Honours ==
Genk

- Belgian First Division A: 2018–19
- Belgian Cup: 2020–21
- Belgian Super Cup: 2019

Reims

- Coupe de France runner-up: 2024–25

Individual

- Belgian First Division A Team of the Season: 2020–21
- Belgian First Division A top assist provider: 2021–22
- Belgian First Division A Goal of the Season: 2021–22
- Japan Pro-Footballers Association Best XI: 2022, 2023, 2024
