= Bryan Limbombe =

Belgian footballer (born 2001)

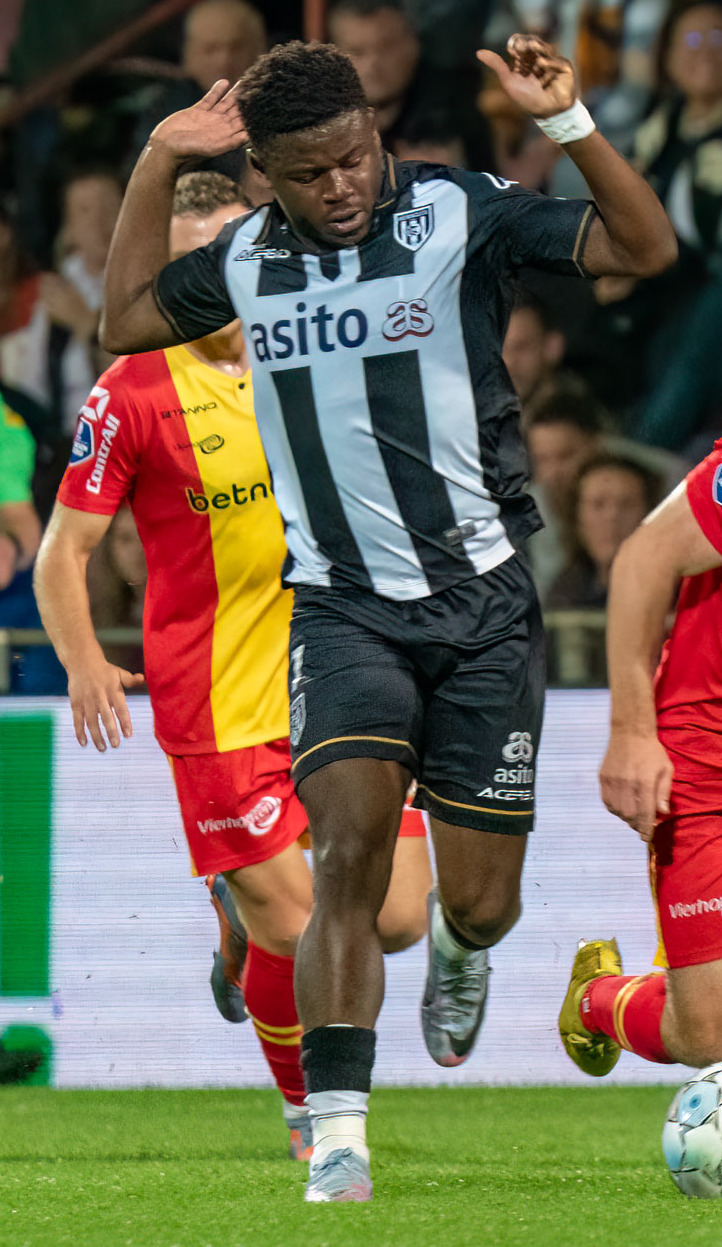

Personal information
- Full name: Bryan Michael Limbombe Ekango
- Date of birth: 14 May 2001 (age 25)
- Place of birth: Mechelen, Belgium
- Height: 1.72 m (5 ft 8 in)
- Position: Left winger

Team information
- Current team: Marítimo
- Number: 35

Youth career
- 2007–2015: Mechelen
- 2015–2017: Zulte Waregem
- 2017–2020: Genk

Senior career*
Years	Team	Apps	(Gls)
2020–2021	Genk	9	(0)
2021–2023	Roda JC	68	(14)
2023–2026	Heracles Almelo	67	(3)
2026–	Marítimo	3	(0)

International career
2018–2019	Belgium U18	6	(0)
2020	Belgium U19	1	(0)
- * Club domestic league appearances and goals as of 5 September 2026

Bryan Michael Limbombe Ekango (born 14 May 2001) is a Belgian professional footballer who plays as a left winger for Primeira Liga club Marítimo.

== Club career ==
=== Genk ===
On 26 August 2017, Genk announced that 16-year-old Limbombe had signed his first professional contract with them, as he left the youth academy of Zulte Waregem.

On 19 January 2020, Limbombe made his professional debut for Genk in the league match against his former club Zulte Waregem, coming on as a substitute for Jere Uronen in a 3–0 win. Two days after his debut, Genk announced through its official channels that Limbombe's contract was extended until June 2024.

=== Roda JC ===
On 24 August 2021, Limbombe signed a two-year contract with Eerste Divisie club Roda JC. He made his competitive debut for the club on 10 September in a 0–0 league draw against NAC Breda. On 17 September, he scored his first goals for the club, a brace, to secure a 2–0 victory against TOP Oss. He finished his first season with 36 total appearances in which he scored seven goals, as Roda eventually lost out on promotion in the play-offs after a loss in extra time to Excelsior.

=== Heracles Almelo ===
On 29 June 2023, Limbombe signed a four-year contract with recently promoted Eredivisie club Heracles Almelo. He was handed the number 7 shirt.

=== Marítimo ===
On 6 August 2026, Limbombe moved to Marítimo in Portugal on a two-season deal.

== Personal life ==
Born in Belgium, Limbombe is of Congolese descent. He is the brother of the footballers Anthony, Stallone and Maxime Limbombe.

== Career statistics ==
As of match played 17 December 2023

Appearances and goals by club, season and competition
Club	Season	League			Cup		Europe		Other		Total	
Club	Season	Division	Apps	Goals	Apps	Goals	Apps	Goals	Apps	Goals	Apps	Goals
Genk	2019–20 (Note: Season curtailed due to COVID-19 pandemic in Belgium)	Jupiler Pro League	5	0	0	0	0	0	0	0	5	0
Genk	2020–21	Jupiler Pro League	4	0	0	0	0	0	0	0	4	0
Genk	Total		9	0	0	0	0	0	0	0	9	0
Roda JC	2021–22	Eerste Divisie	33	7	1	0	—		2 (Note: Appearances in the Eredivisie play-offs)	0	36	7
Roda JC	2022–23	Eerste Divisie	35	7	1	0	—		—		36	7
Roda JC	Total		68	14	2	0	0	0	2	0	72	14
Heracles Almelo	2023–24	Eredivisie	14	1	1	0	—		—		15	1
Career total			91	15	3	0	0	0	2	0	96	15
