= Kristian Thorstvedt =

Norwegian footballer (born 1999)

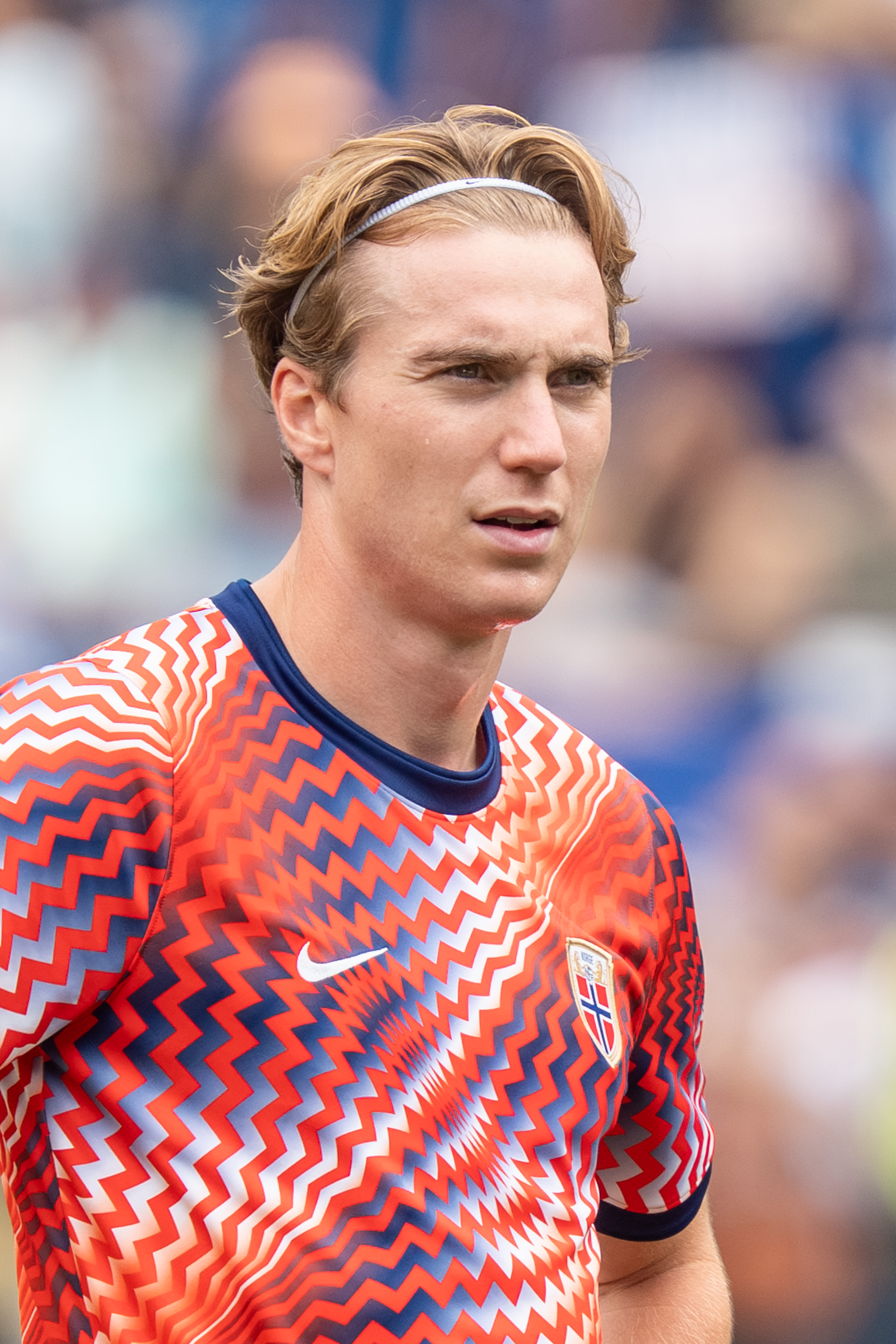
- Thorstvedt with Norway in 2026

Personal information
- Full name: Kristian Thorstvedt
- Date of birth: 13 March 1999 (age 27)
- Place of birth: Stavanger, Norway
- Height: 1.89 m (6 ft 2 in)
- Position: Midfielder

Team information
- Current team: Sassuolo
- Number: 42

Youth career
- –2012: Viking
- 2013–2017: Stabæk

Senior career*
Years	Team	Apps	(Gls)
2018–2019	Viking	50	(19)
2020–2022	Genk	73	(14)
2022–	Sassuolo	127	(21)

International career^{‡}
2018	Norway U19	1	(0)
2019	Norway U20	5	(0)
2019–2020	Norway U21	7	(4)
2020–	Norway	40	(4)
- * Club domestic league appearances and goals as of 19:38, 27 October 2026 (UTC) ‡ National team caps and goals as of 25 September 2026

Kristian Thorstvedt (born 13 March 1999) is a Norwegian professional footballer who plays as a midfielder for Serie A club Sassuolo and the Norway national team.

== Club career ==
=== Early career ===
On 1 February 2018, Thorstvedt signed a one-and-a-half-year contract with Viking. He was awarded young player of the season in the 2018 1. divisjon.

=== Genk ===
On 3 January 2020, he signed a three-and-a-half-year contract with Genk.

On 4 March 2021, Thorstvedt netted a brace in Genk's 4–1 defeat of Mechelen in the quarter-final stage of the Belgian Cup. Genk would eventually go on to beat Standard Liège in the final to win the domestic cup for the fifth time in club history. On 20 May 2021, Thorstvedt scored a hat-trick in a 4–0 league win over Royal Antwerp. On 28 April 2022, Genk announced that they had extended Thorstvedt's contract, keeping him with the club through the end of the 2024-25 season.

=== Sassuolo ===
On 12 July 2022, Sassuolo announced the signing of Thorstvedt from Genk, on a five-year contract.

== International career ==
With the Norway under-20 team, he took part in the 2019 FIFA U-20 World Cup. During the tournament, held in Poland, he made three appearances. He stood out in the final group-stage match by providing two assists in a 12–0 victory over Honduras. Despite recording one win and two defeats, Norway failed to advance beyond the group stage.

He earned his first cap for the Norway under-21 team on 6 September 2019 in a UEFA European Under-21 Championship qualification match against Cyprus. He marked his debut by scoring a goal. In November 2019, he again impressed during the qualification campaign, scoring twice against Cyprus and once against Portugal.

On 21 May 2026, Thorstvedt was included in the 26-man squad selected by Norway national team manager Ståle Solbakken for the 2026 FIFA World Cup.

== Personal life ==
Kristian Thorstvedt is the son of former goalkeeper Erik Thorstvedt.

== Career statistics ==
=== Club ===
As of match played 27 October 2026

Appearances and goals by club, season and competition
Club	Season	League			National cup		Continental		Total	
Club	Season	Division	Apps	Goals	Apps	Goals	Apps	Goals	Apps	Goals
Stabæk 2	2016	2. divisjon	1	0	–		–		1	0
Stabæk 2	2017	3. divisjon	20	5	–		–		20	5
Stabæk 2	Total		21	5	–		–		21	5
Viking 2	2018	3. divisjon	2	0	–		–		2	0
Viking	2018	1. divisjon	24	9	1	0	–		25	9
Viking	2019	Eliteserien	26	10	6	3	–		32	13
Viking	Total		50	19	7	3	–		57	22
Genk	2019–20	Belgian Pro League	8	1	0	0	–		8	1
Genk	2020–21	Belgian Pro League	30	7	4	2	–		34	9
Genk	2021–22	Belgian Pro League	35	6	2	1	8	0	45	7
Genk	Total		73	14	6	3	8	0	87	17
Sassuolo	2022–23	Serie A	31	2	1	0	–		32	2
Sassuolo	2023–24	Serie A	34	6	2	0	–		36	6
Sassuolo	2024–25	Serie B	22	7	2	0	–		24	7
Sassuolo	2025–26	Serie A	32	4	1	0	–		33	4
Sassuolo	2026–27	Serie A	8	2	1	0	–		9	2
Sassuolo	Total		127	21	7	0	–		134	21
Career total			273	59	20	6	8	0	301	65

=== International ===
As of match played 24 September 2026

Appearances and goals by national team and year
National team	Year	Apps	Goals
Norway	2020	1	0
Norway	2021	10	3
Norway	2022	7	1
Norway	2023	7	0
Norway	2024	6	0
Norway	2025	2	0
Norway	2026	7	0
Total		40	4

Scores and results list Norway's goal tally first, score column indicates score after each Thorstvedt goal.

List of international goals scored by Kristian Thorstvedt
No.	Date	Venue	Opponent	Score	Result	Competition
1	24 March 2021	Victoria Stadium, Gibraltar	Gibraltar	2–0	3–0	2022 FIFA World Cup qualification
2	7 September 2021	Ullevaal Stadion, Oslo, Norway	Gibraltar	1–0	5–1	2022 FIFA World Cup qualification
3	8 October 2021	Şükrü Saracoğlu Stadium, Istanbul, Turkey	Turkey	1–1	1–1	2022 FIFA World Cup qualification
4	29 March 2022	Ullevaal Stadion, Oslo, Norway	Armenia	3–0	9–0	Friendly

== Honours ==
Viking

- Norwegian Football Cup: 2019
- Norwegian First Division: 2018

Genk

- Belgian Cup: 2020–21

Sassuolo

- Serie B: 2024–25

Individual

- Norwegian First Division Young Player of the Season: 2018
