= Alexandre Boucaut =

Belgian football referee

- Full name: Alexandre Boucaut
- Born: 10 August 1980 (age 46); Belgium

Domestic
Years	League	Role
2009–	Belgian Pro League	Referee

Alexandre Boucaut (born 10 August 1980) is a Belgian football referee. He made his debut in the Belgian Pro League at 8 February 2009 in a game between KVC Westerlo and KSC Lokeren. As profession, he's head of a bank in Ath.
