= Théo Bongonda =

Congolese footballer

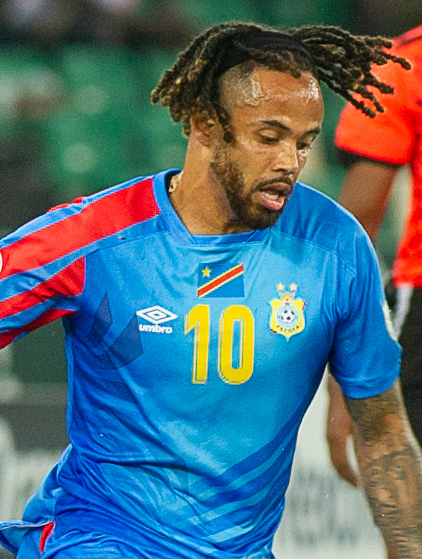
- Bongonda playing for DR Congo at the 2023 Africa Cup of Nations

Personal information
- Full name: Théo Bongonda Mbul'Ofeko Batombo
- Date of birth: 20 November 1995 (age 30)
- Place of birth: Charleroi, Belgium
- Height: 1.77 m (5 ft 10 in)
- Position: Winger

Team information
- Current team: Al Faisaly
- Number: 10

Youth career
- 2008–2013: JMG Academy
- 2013: Zulte-Waregem

Senior career*
Years	Team	Apps	(Gls)
2013–2014	Zulte-Waregem	33	(4)
2015–2018	Celta	61	(4)
2017–2018	→ Trabzonspor (loan)	3	(0)
2018	→ Zulte-Waregem (loan)	11	(5)
2018–2019	Zulte-Waregem	28	(8)
2019–2022	Genk	91	(33)
2022–2023	Cádiz	31	(4)
2023–2026	Spartak Moscow	56	(14)
2026–	Al Faisaly	8	(3)

International career^{‡}
2013–2014	Belgium U19	5	(2)
2014–2016	Belgium U21	8	(2)
2022–	DR Congo	43	(7)
- * Club domestic league appearances and goals as of 23 October 2026 ‡ National team caps and goals as of 2 October 2026

Théo Bongonda Mbul'Ofeko Batombo (born 20 November 1995) is a professional footballer who plays as a winger for Saudi Pro League club Al Faisaly. Born in Belgium, he plays for the DR Congo national team.

== Club career ==
=== Zulte Waregem ===
Born in Charleroi, Bongonda began his career in JMG Academy in 2008, aged 13. In January 2013, he joined Belgian Pro League team SV Zulte Waregem, initially assigned to the youth setup.

Bongonda made his professional debut on 25 September 2013, starting in a 2–1 away win against KFC VW Hamme, for the season's Belgian Cup. His league debut came on 15 December, coming on as a second half substitute in a 3–0 home win against Lierse SK.

Bongonda scored his first professional goal on 15 January 2014, netting his side's first in a 2–3 away loss against Cercle Brugge KSV. On 20 April 2014, he scored his first league goal, netting the first in a 3–2 away loss against KSC Lokeren.

=== Celta Vigo ===
On 9 January 2015, Bongonda signed a four-and-a-half-year contract with La Liga side Celta de Vigo. He made his debut in the competition on the 26th, coming on as a late substitute for Nemanja Radoja in a 2–1 away loss against Getafe CF.

==== Trabzonspor ====
On 15 June 2017, Bongonda joined Trabzonspor on a season-long loan deal with an option to buy. He however ended up being on the bench more than on the pitch.

==== Zulte Waregem ====
During the winter transfer window of the 2017–18 season, Bongonda rejoined Zulte-Waregem on loan. On 4 July 2018, he joined Essevee permanently on a four-year contract, until 30 June 2022.

=== Genk ===
Bongonda joined fellow Belgian First Division A club Genk in summer 2019 for a club-record fee.

Bongonda scored the game winner for Genk against Standard Liège in the Belgian Cup Final on 25 April 2021.

On 23 July 2021, Bongonda scored Genk's first goal in the 2021–22 Belgian First Division A season, securing a 1–1 draw against the same opponents.

=== Cádiz ===
On 26 August 2022, Bongonda Edris returned to Spain after signing a four-year contract with Cádiz in the top tier.

=== Spartak Moscow ===
In July 2023, Bongonda agreed to move to Russian club Spartak. The contract is calculated until 2026. It is alleged that Spartak paid Cadiz 10 million euros.

He left Spartak at the conclusion of the 2025–26 season.

== International career ==
Bongonda was born in Belgium to a Congolese father and Belgian mother. He is a youth international for Belgium. In January 2022, Fifa accepted his eligibility join the DR Congo national team. He debuted for the DR Congo national team in a 1–0 friendly loss to Bahrain on 1 February 2022.

On 27 December 2023, he was selected from the list of 24 Congolese players selected by Sébastien Desabre to compete in the 2023 Africa Cup of Nations.

On 19 May 2026, he was included in the 26-man squad selected by head coach Sébastien Desabre to represent the DR Congo at the 2026 FIFA World Cup.

== Career statistics ==
=== Club ===
As of match played 11 September 2026

Appearances and goals by club, season and competition
Club	Season	League			National cup		Europe		Other		Total	
Club	Season	Division	Apps	Goals	Apps	Goals	Apps	Goals	Apps	Goals	Apps	Goals
Zulte Waregem	2013–14	Belgian Pro League	19	0	5	1	0	0	—		24	1
Zulte Waregem	2014–15	Belgian Pro League	14	3	2	0	3 (Note: Appearances in UEFA Europa League)	0	0	0	19	3
Zulte Waregem	Total		33	3	7	1	3	0	—		43	5
Celta Vigo	2014–15	La Liga	8	1	1	0	0	0	—		9	1
Celta Vigo	2015–16	La Liga	23	2	3	0	0	0	—		26	2
Celta Vigo	2016–17	La Liga	30	1	6	1	6	0	—		42	2
Celta Vigo	Total		61	4	10	1	6	0	—		77	5
Trabzonspor (loan)	2017–18	Süper Lig	3	0	3	2	0	0	—		6	2
Zulte Waregem (loan)	2017–18	Belgian Pro League	11	5	—		0	0	2	0	13	5
Zulte Waregem	2018–19	Belgian Pro League	28	8	2	0	0	0	9	6	39	14
Genk	2019–20	Belgian Pro League	22	5	1	0	6 (Note: Appearances in UEFA Champions League)	0	—		29	5
Genk	2020–21	Belgian Pro League	35	16	4	2	—		—		39	18
Genk	2021–22	Belgian Pro League	34	12	0	0	0	0	1 (Note: Appearance in Belgian Super Cup)	1	35	13
Genk	Total		91	33	5	2	6	0	1	1	103	36
Cádiz	2022–23	La Liga	31	4	1	0	—		—		32	4
Spartak Moscow	2023–24	Russian Premier League	25	7	10	1	—		—		35	8
Spartak Moscow	2024–25	Russian Premier League	27	7	7	1	—		—		34	8
Spartak Moscow	2025–26	Russian Premier League	4	0	2	0	—		—		6	0
Spartak Moscow	Total		56	14	19	2	—		—		75	16
Al Faisaly	2026–27	Saudi Pro League	5	2	0	0	—		—		5	2
Career total			319	73	47	8	15	0	12	7	393	88

=== International ===
As of match played 2 October 2026

Appearances and goals by national team and year
National team	Year	Apps	Goals
DR Congo	2022	3	0
DR Congo	2023	8	3
DR Congo	2024	15	1
DR Congo	2025	9	3
DR Congo	2026	8	0
Total		43	7

Scores and results list DR Congo's goal tally first.

List of international goals scored by Théo Bongonda
No.	Date	Venue	Opponent	Score	Result	Competition
1.	14 June 2023	Stade de la Réunification, Douala, Cameroon	Uganda	1–0	1–0	Friendly
2.	9 September 2023	Stade des Martyrs, Kinshasa, DR Congo	Sudan	1–0	2–0	2023 Africa Cup of Nations qualification
3.	15 November 2023	Stade des Martyrs, Kinshasa, DR Congo	Mauritania	2–0	2–0	2026 FIFA World Cup qualification
4.	9 September 2024	Benjamin Mkapa Stadium, Dar es Salaam, Tanzania	Ethiopia	1–0	2–0	2025 Africa Cup of Nations qualification
5.	21 March 2025	Stade des Martyrs, Kinshasa, DR Congo	South Sudan	1–0	1–0	2026 FIFA World Cup qualification
6.	14 October 2025	Stade des Martyrs, Kinshasa, DR Congo	Sudan	1–0	1–0	2026 FIFA World Cup qualification
7.	23 December 2025	Al Medina Stadium, Rabat, Morocco	Benin	1–0	1–0	2025 Africa Cup of Nations

== Honours ==
Genk

- Belgian Cup: 2020–21

Spartak Moscow

- Russian Cup: 2025–26
