= 2019 Belgian Super Cup =

Genk	Mechelen
League winners	Cup winners
3	0
- Date: 20 July 2019
- Venue: Luminus Arena, Genk
- Man of the Match: Sébastien Dewaest
- Referee: Lawrence Visser
- Attendance: 14,160
- Weather: Sunny

The 2019 Belgian Super Cup was a football match that took place on 20 July 2019 between Genk, the winners of the 2018–19 Belgian First Division A, and Mechelen, the winners of the 2018–19 Belgian Cup. In its eighth appearance, Genk won its second Belgian Super Cup after already winning the 2011 edition, by a convincing 3–0 margin. Defender Sébastien Dewaest was twice able to score from a set piece delivery, with Dante Vanzeir scoring the final goal in the closing minutes. Mechelen could have become only the ninth different club to win the Belgian Super Cup, but failed to win again after an earlier loss in the 1987 Belgian Super Cup. With the victory of Genk, the Belgian Super Cup was won for the 15th consecutive year by the league winners, as the 2004 Belgian Super Cup still marked the last year the cup winners overcame the league winners, when Club Brugge beat Anderlecht.

== Match ==
=== Details ===
20 July 2019
20:30 CEST

Genk	3–0	Mechelen
Dewaest 14', 60'; Vanzeir 83'	Sporza

Luminus Arena, Genk
Attendance: 14,160
Referee: Lawrence Visser

Genk	Mechelen

GK	1	(Australia) Danny Vukovic
RB	2	(Belgium) Casper de Norre
CB	6	(Belgium) Sébastien Dewaest (c)
CB	46	(Colombia) Carlos Cuesta
LB	21	(Finland) Jere Uronen
DM	25	(Norway) Sander Berge
CM	8	(Belgium) Bryan Heynen
CM	19	(Poland) Jakub Piotrowski		(substituted off) 63'
RW	7	(Japan) Junya Itō		(substituted off) 76'
LW	22	(Belgium) Manuel Benson
CF	10	(Tanzania) Mbwana Samatta		(substituted off) 71'
Substitutes:
DM	4	(Belgium) Dries Wouters
LW	11	(Ghana) Joseph Paintsil
CF	14	(Sweden) Benjamin Nygren	(yellow card) 88'	(substituted on) 63'
RW	16	(Belgium) Dante Vanzeir		(substituted on) 71'
AM	23	(Romania) Ianis Hagi
GK	28	(Belgium) Gaëtan Coucke
CB	33	(Colombia) Jhon Lucumí
RW	77	(Democratic Republic of the Congo) Dieumerci Ndongala		(substituted on) 76'
Manager:
(Belgium) Felice Mazzu

GK	34	(Netherlands) Michael Verrips
RB	2	(Belgium) Jules Van Cleemput	(yellow card) 90+1'
CB	23	(France) Thibault Peyre
CB	5	(Netherlands) Arjan Swinkels (c)
LB	3	(Netherlands) Lucas Bijker	(yellow card) 88'
CM	16	(Belgium) Rob Schoofs	(yellow card) 65'
CM	13	(Belgium) Joachim Van Damme		(substituted off) 88'
CM	22	(Belgium) Alexander Corryn
LW	11	(Belgium) Nikola Storm		(substituted off) 79'
FW	20	(Sweden) Gustav Engvall	(yellow card) 66'	(substituted off) 65'
FW	29	(Ivory Coast) William Togui
Substitutes:
CF	10	(Belgium) Igor de Camargo		(substituted on) 65'
GK	12	(Belgium) Sofiane Bouzian
DM	17	(Burkina Faso) Trova Boni
LB	19	(Belgium) Alec Van Hoorenbeeck
GK	28	(Belgium) Arno Valkenaers
AM	33	(Belgium) Gaétan Bosiers		(substituted on) 79'
MF	37	(Belgium) Mohamed Zeroual
AM	38	(Belgium) Arno Van Keilegom
CM	40	(Belgium) Aster Vranckx		(substituted on) 88'
Manager:
(Belgium) Wouter Vrancken

Match rules

- 90 minutes.
- Penalty shoot-out if scores level.
- Nine named substitutes.
- Maximum of three substitutions.

== See also ==
- 2019–20 Belgian First Division A
- 2019–20 Belgian Cup
