= 2019–20 KRC Genk season =

Genk
2019–20 season
- Chairman: Peter Croonen
- Head coach: Felice Mazzu
- Stadium: Luminus Arena
- Belgian First Division A: 7th
- Belgian Cup: Seventh round
- Belgian Super Cup: Winners
- UEFA Champions League: Group stage
- Top goalscorer: League: Paul Onuachu (9); All: Paul Onuachu; Mbwana Samatta (10 each)
Home colours	Away colours	Third colours

The 2019–20 season was K.R.C. Genk's 32nd season in existence and the club's 25th consecutive season in the top flight of Belgium football. It covered a period from 1 July 2019 to 30 June 2020. Genk competed in the Belgian First Division A, the Belgian Cup and the UEFA Champions League.

== Players ==
=== Current squad ===
As of 3 September 2019

Note: Flags indicate national team as defined under FIFA eligibility rules; some limited exceptions apply. Players may hold more than one non-FIFA nationality.

No.	Pos.	Nation	Player
1	GK	AUS	Danny Vukovic
2	DF	BEL	Casper de Norre
4	MF	BEL	Dries Wouters
5	DF	BRA	Neto Borges
6	DF	BEL	Sébastien Dewaest
7	FW	JPN	Junya Ito (on loan from Kashiwa Reysol)
8	MF	BEL	Bryan Heynen
10	FW	TAN	Mbwana Samatta
11	FW	GHA	Joseph Paintsil
14	FW	SWE	Benjamin Nygren
15	FW	NGR	Stephen Odey
17	MF	SVK	Patrik Hrošovský
18	FW	NGR	Paul Onuachu
19	MF	POL	Jakub Piotrowski

No.	Pos.	Nation	Player
21	DF	FIN	Jere Uronen
23	MF	ROU	Ianis Hagi
25	MF	NOR	Sander Berge
26	GK	BEL	Maarten Vandevoordt
27	FW	BEL	Theo Bongonda
28	GK	BEL	Gaëtan Coucke
31	DF	DEN	Joakim Mæhle
33	DF	COL	Jhon Lucumí
35	DF	BEL	Shawn Adewoye
40	GK	BEL	Tobe Leysen
46	DF	COL	Carlos Cuesta
54	MF	ROU	Vladimir Screciu
77	MF	COD	Dieumerci Ndongala

=== Out on loan ===
Note: Flags indicate national team as defined under FIFA eligibility rules; some limited exceptions apply. Players may hold more than one non-FIFA nationality.

No.	Pos.	Nation	Player
16	FW	BEL	Dante Vanzeir (at KV Mechelen until 30 June 2020)
20	MF	CRO	Ivan Fiolić (at AEK Larnaca until 31 May 2020)
24	DF	MAR	Amine Khammas (at Lommel until 30 June 2020)
30	GK	BEL	Nordin Jackers (at Waasland-Beveren until 30 June 2020)

No.	Pos.	Nation	Player
91	FW	BEL	Adriano Bertaccini (at Deinze until 30 June 2020)
93	FW	BEL	Zinho Gano (at Antwerp until 30 June 2020)
—	DF	BEL	Rubin Seigers (at Beerschot until 30 June 2020)
—	MF	KOS	Edon Zhegrova (at Basel until 30 June 2020)

== Pre-season and friendlies ==
Win Draw Loss

29 June 2019 Friendly	Eendracht Termien (Belgium)	2–5	(Belgium) Genk	Genk, Belgium
16:00 CEST (UTC+2)				Stadium: Terrain 't Heke

6 July 2019 Friendly	Beringen (Belgium)	0–12	(Belgium) Genk	Beringen, Belgium
18:00 CEST (UTC+2)				Stadium: Sportpark De Motbemden

14 July 2019 Friendly	Genk (Belgium)	3–0	(Croatia) NK Lokomotiva	Swolgen, Netherlands
16:00 CEST (UTC+2)				Stadium: Sportpark Sporting Swolgen Tienray

21 July 2019 Friendly	Westerlo (Belgium)	2–1	(Belgium) Genk	Westerlo, Belgium
16:00 CEST (UTC+2)				Stadium: Het Kuipje

10 January 2020 Friendly	1. FC Köln (Germany)	1–1	(Belgium) Genk	Benidorm, Spain
14:00 CET (UTC+1)	Jakobs 59'		Bongonda 71'	Stadium: Estadio Municipal Guillermo Amor

10 January 2020 Friendly	Ferencváros (Hungary)	1–2	(Belgium) Genk	La Nucia, Spain
17:30 CET (UTC+1)	Lovrencsics 28'		Oyen 81'; Odey 85'	Stadium: Estadio Camilo Cano

== Competitions ==
=== Overview ===
Competition	First match	Last match	Starting round	Final position	Record							
Competition	First match	Last match	Starting round	Final position	Pld	W	D	L	GF	GA	GD	Win %
Belgian First Division A	26 July 2019	7 March 2020	Matchday 1	7th	29	13	5	11	48	45	+3	44.83
Belgian Cup	24 September 2019	3 December 2019	Sixth round	Seventh round	2	1	1	0	6	3	+3	50.00
Super Cup	20 July 2019		Final	Winners	1	1	0	0	3	0	+3	100.00
UEFA Champions League	17 September 2019	10 December 2019	Group stage	Group stage	6	0	1	5	5	20	−15	0.00
Total					38	15	7	16	62	68	−6	39.47

Source: Soccerway

=== Belgian First Division A ===
==== League table ====
Pos	Team	Pld	W	D	L	GF	GA	GD	Pts	Qualification or relegation
5	Standard Liège	29	14	7	8	47	32	+15	49	Qualification for the Europa League second qualifying round
6	Mechelen	29	13	5	11	46	43	+3	44	
7	Genk	29	13	5	11	45	42	+3	44	
8	Anderlecht	29	11	10	8	45	29	+16	43	
9	Zulte Waregem	29	10	6	13	41	49	−8	36	

Source: Belgian First Division A (in Dutch), Soccerway
Rules for classification: 1) Points; 2) Matches won; 3) Goal difference; 4) Goals scored; 5) Away goals scored; 6) Away matches won; 7) Play-off.

==== Results summary ====
Overall								Home						Away					
Pld	W	D	L	GF	GA	GD	Pts	W	D	L	GF	GA	GD	W	D	L	GF	GA	GD
29	13	5	11	48	45	+3	44	8	1	5	21	18	+3	5	4	6	27	27	0

Last updated: 7 March 2020.
Source: Jupiler Pro League

==== Results by round ====
Round	1	2	3	4	5	6	7	8	9	10	11	12	13	14	15	16	17	18	19	20	21	22	23	24	25	26	27	28	29	30
Ground	H	A	H	A	H	A	A	H	A	H	A	H	H	A	H	A	H	A	H	A	H	A	A	H	A	H	A	H	A	H
Result	W	L	L	W	W	D	L	W	D	W	L	W	D	L	L	D	L	W	W	L	W	W	L	W	D	L	W	L	W	C
Position	5	8	10	8	6	6	9	7	6	7	6	7	8	9	9	8	8	6	8	8	6	6	6	6	6	6	6	7	7	7

Updated to match(es) played on 7 March 2020. Source: Jupiler Pro League
A = Away; H = Home; W = Win; D = Draw; L = Loss

==== Matches ====
On 2 April 2020, the Jupiler Pro League's board of directors proposed to cancel the season due to the COVID-19 pandemic. The General Assembly accepted the proposal on 15 May, and officially ended the 2019–20 season.

26 July 2019 1	Genk	2–1	Kortrijk	Genk
20:30 CEST (UTC+2)	Nygren 50'; Hagi 76'	Report	De Sart 13'; Golubović (yellow card) 86'	Stadium: Luminus Arena; Referee: Erik Lambrechts

3 August 2019 2	KV Mechelen	3–1	Genk	Mechelen
20:30 CEST (UTC+2)	Togui 18'; Engvall (yellow card) 54', (goal) 77'; De Camargo 80'	Report	Samatta 45+4'	Stadium: Achter de Kazerne; Referee: Bram Van Driessche

10 August 2019 3	Genk	0–2	Zulte Waregem	Genk
20:30 CEST (UTC+2)	Heynen (yellow card) 90+3'	Report	Bjørdal 6', (yellow card) 56'; Bürki (yellow card) 65'; Berahino 78'	Stadium: Luminus Arena; Referee: Lothar D'hondt

17 August 2019 4	Waasland-Beveren	0–4	Genk	Beveren
20:30 CEST (UTC+2)	Wiegel (yellow card) 52'; Heymans (yellow card) 90+2'	Report	Paintsil 21'; Samatta 53', 66', 86'	Stadium: Freethiel Stadion; Referee: Kevin Van Damme

23 August 2019 5	Genk	1–0	Anderlecht	Genk
20:30 CEST (UTC+2)	Samatta 55'	Report	Kana (yellow card) 90+3'	Stadium: Luminus Arena; Referee: Lawrence Visser

1 September 2019 6	Club Brugge	1–1	Genk	Bruges
14:30 CEST (UTC+2)	Deli 41'; Okereke (yellow card) 45+1'; Dennis (yellow card) 90+1'	Report	Piotrowski (yellow card) 21'; Berge (yellow card) 56'; Dewaest 67'; Ndongala (yellow card) 79'; Samatta (yellow card) 85'	Stadium: Jan Breydel Stadium; Referee: Erik Lambrechts

13 September 2019 7	Charleroi	2–1	Genk	Charleroi
20:30 CEST (UTC+2)	Morioka 26' (pen.); Nicholson 29'; Ilaimaharitra (yellow card) 51'; Bruno (yellow card) 69'; Dessoleil (yellow card) 73'; Marinos (yellow card) 81'; Busi (yellow card) 85'; Rezaei (yellow card) 90+5'	Report	Onuachu 61'; Dewaest (yellow card) 74'	Stadium: Stade du Pays de Charleroi; Referee: Nathan Verboomen

21 September 2019 8	Genk	3–1	Oostende	Genk
20:30 CEST (UTC+2)	Hagi (yellow card) 7'; Vargas 16' (o.g.); Onuachu 44'; Hrošovský (yellow card) 86'; Berge 90'	Report	Sylla 32', (yellow card) 75'; Vandendriessche (yellow card) 82'	Stadium: Luminus Arena; Referee: Bram Van Driessche

28 September 2019 9	Sint-Truiden	3–3	Genk	Sint-Truiden
20:30 CEST (UTC+2)	Janssens (yellow card) 25'; García (yellow card) 35', (goal) 80'; Botaka (yellow card) 47'; Mmaee (yellow card) 59'; De Smet (yellow card) 59'; Boli 63', 87'; Sousa (yellow card) 82'	Report	Bongonda 15'; Hagi 48' (pen.), 60' (pen.); Mæhle (yellow card) 79'	Stadium: Stayen; Referee: Lawrence Visser
Note: The match was abandoned in the final moments because of the behavior of the supporters of both teams. However, the result stood.

6 October 2019 10	Genk	2–1	Excel Mouscron	Genk
20:00 CEST (UTC+2)	Onuachu 75', 90+8'; Heynen (yellow card) 90+3'	Report	Osabutey 49'; Boya (yellow card) 54'; De Medina (yellow card) 62'	Stadium: Luminus Arena; Referee: Kevin Van Damme

19 October 2019 11	Standard Liège	1–0	Genk	Liège
18:00 CEST (UTC+2)	Cimirot (yellow card) 61'; Oularé (yellow card) 83'; Bastien 84'	Report	Dewaest (yellow card) 63'	Stadium: Stade Maurice Dufrasne; Referee: Nicolas Laforge

26 October 2019 12	Genk	1–0	Cercle Brugge	Genk
20:30 CEST (UTC+2)	Dewaest 8'	Report	Dekuyper (yellow card) 76'; Donsah (yellow card) 81'	Stadium: Luminus Arena; Referee: Bert Put

30 October 2019 13	Genk	2–2	Antwerp	Genk
20:30 CET (UTC+1)	Samatta 69'; Berge 90+6'	Report	Lamkel Zé 8', (yellow card) 45+1'; Rodrigues (yellow card) 33' (yellow-red card) 82', (goal) 47'; De Sart (yellow card) 63'	Stadium: Luminus Arena; Referee: Wesley Alen

2 November 2019 14	Eupen	2–0	Genk	Eupen
18:00 CET (UTC+1)	Bolingi 20'; Amat 23'	Report	Wouters (yellow card) 22'	Stadium: Kehrwegstadion; Referee: Wesli De Cremer

10 November 2019 15	Genk	0–2	Gent	Genk
18:00 CET (UTC+1)	Cuesta (yellow card) 53'; Heynen (yellow card) 66'; Dewaest (yellow card) 71'	Report	Depoitre 2'; Jonathan David 47'	Stadium: Luminus Arena; Referee: Erik Lambrechts

23 November 2019 16	Excel Mouscron	2–2	Genk	Mouscron
20:30 CET (UTC+1)	Perica 2'; De Medina (yellow card) 36'; Antonov 65'	Report	Dewaest 20'; Onuachu 54'	Stadium: Stade Le Canonnier; Referee: Wim Smet

30 November 2019 17	Genk	1–2	Sint-Truiden	Genk
20:30 CET (UTC+1)	Samatta 9'; Ito (yellow card) 76'	Report	Boli 17'; Suzuki 40'; Colombatto (yellow card) 55'	Stadium: Luminus Arena; Referee: Bram Van Driessche

7 December 2019 18	Cercle Brugge	1–2	Genk	Bruges
20:00 CET (UTC+1)	Somers 65'; Dekuyper (yellow card) 86'	Report	Ito 34'; Borges (yellow card) 45+7'; Mæhle (yellow card) 57'; Berge 70', (yellow card) 84'	Stadium: Jan Breydel Stadium; Referee: Nathan Verboomen

14 December 2019 19	Genk	4–1	Waasland-Beveren	Genk
20:30 CET (UTC+1)	Bongonda 10'; Onuachu 26'; Lucumí 35', (yellow card) 87'; Berge 70'	Report	Foulon (yellow card) 36'; Vukotić 88'; Koita (yellow card) 90+2'	Stadium: Luminus Arena; Referee: Erik Lambrechts

22 December 2019 20	Anderlecht	2–0	Genk	Anderlecht
20:00 CET (UTC+1)	Vlap 54', 61'	Report		Stadium: Constant Vanden Stock Stadium; Referee: Nicolas Laforge

26 December 2019 21	Genk	2–1	Eupen	Genk
14:30 CET (UTC+1)	Ito 12'; Dewaest (yellow card) 37'; Onuachu 60'	Report	Koch (yellow card) 5'; Lazare 63', (yellow card) 81'; Embaló (yellow card) 90+1'	Stadium: Luminus Arena; Attendance: 24,956; Referee: Lothar D'hondt

19 January 2020 22	Zulte Waregem	0–3	Genk	Waregem
20:00 CET (UTC+1)		Report	Thorstvedt 23'; Mæhle (yellow card) 50'; Ito 55'; Bongonda 63', (yellow card) 70'	Stadium: Regenboogstadion; Referee: Alexandre Boucaut

25 January 2020 23	Gent	4–1	Genk	Ghent
20:30 CET (UTC+1)	Mohammadi 45'; Bezus 52'; Odjidja-Ofoe 88'; Niangbo 90+4'	Report	Bongonda 16', (yellow card) 23'	Stadium: Ghelamco Arena; Referee: Erik Lambrechts

1 February 2020 24	Genk	1–0	Charleroi	Genk
18:00 CET (UTC+1)	Hrošovský 39'; Mæhle (yellow card) 59'; Onuachu (yellow card) 81'	Report	Willems (yellow card) 14'; Gholizadeh (yellow card) 43'; Penneteau (yellow card) 63'	Stadium: Luminus Arena; Referee: Jonathan Lardot

13 February 2020 25	Antwerp	1–1	Genk	Antwerp
20:30 CET (UTC+1)	Juklerød (yellow card) 30'; Mæhle 39' (o.g.); Buta (yellow card) 50'	Report	Onuachu 12'; Wouters (yellow card) 86'; Lucumí (yellow card) 88'	Stadium: Bosuilstadion; Referee: Jan Boterberg

16 February 2020 26	Genk	1–3	Standard Liège	Genk
18:00 CET (UTC+1)	Wouters (yellow card) 63'; Dewaest (yellow card) 69', (goal) 84'	Report	Vanheusden 31'; Laifis (yellow card) 34'; Cimirot (yellow card) 37'; Čop 42'; Boljević 90+2'	Stadium: Luminus Arena; Referee: Nicolas Laforge

21 February 2020 27	Kortrijk	0–1	Genk	Kortrijk
20:30 CET (UTC+1)	Van der Bruggen (yellow card) 54'; Derijck (yellow card) 57'; Tuta (yellow card) 90+4'	Report	Kouassi (yellow card) 19'; Wouters 58', (yellow card) 80'; Mæhle (yellow card) 76'; Odey (yellow card) 90+3'	Stadium: Guldensporen Stadion; Referee: Wesley Alen

1 March 2020 28	Genk	1–2	Club Brugge	Genk
14:30 CET (UTC+1)	Ito 9'; Wouters (yellow card) 62'; Kouassi (yellow card) 72'	Report	De Ketelaere 3'; Diatta (yellow card) 62'; Mata (yellow card) 64'; Álvarez (yellow card) 71'; Rits 89'; Sobol (yellow card) 90+4'	Stadium: Luminus Arena; Attendance: 24,956; Referee: Erik Lambrechts

7 March 2020 29	Oostende	2–4	Genk	Ostend
20:00 CET (UTC+1)	Verstraete (yellow card) 24' (yellow-red card) 45'; Sakala 43'; Marquet 76'	Report	Bongonda (yellow card) 45+4', (goal) 59'; Onuachu 48' (pen.); Ito 67'; Dæhli 70'	Stadium: Versluys Arena; Attendance: 5,532; Referee: Jonathan Lardot

15 March 2020 30	Genk	Cancelled	KV Mechelen	Genk
18:00 CET (UTC+1)				Stadium: Luminus Arena
Note: The match was cancelled due to the COVID-19 pandemic.

=== Belgian Cup ===
24 September 2019 Sixth round	Ronse	0–3	Genk	Ronse
20:30 CEST (UTC+2)	Pieters (yellow card) 71'	Report	Odey 58'; Heynen 72' (pen.); Onuachu 84'	Stadium: Orphale Cruckestadion; Referee: Jan Boterberg

3 December 2019 Seventh round	Antwerp	3–3 (a.e.t.) (4–3 p)	Genk	Antwerp
20:45 CET (UTC+1)	Juklerød 29'; Haroun (yellow card) 40'; Buta (yellow card) 64'; Mbokani 72', 105'; De Sart (yellow card) 96'; Hoedt (yellow card) 99'	Report	Mæhle 4'; Cuesta (yellow card) 70'; Dewaest (yellow card) 76'; Hoedt 80' (o.g.); Ndongala (yellow card) 83'; Borges (yellow card) 89'; Ito 105+1'	Stadium: Bosuilstadion; Referee: Lothar D'Hondt
	Penalties
	Refaelov (penalty scored); Hoedt (penalty missed); Buta (penalty scored); Juklerød (penalty scored); Mbokani (penalty scored)		(penalty scored) Samatta; (penalty scored) Berge; (penalty scored) Lucumí; (penalty missed) Ito; (penalty missed) Wouters

=== Belgian Super Cup ===
20 July 2019 Final	Genk	3–0	KV Mechelen	Genk
20:30 CEST (UTC+2)	Dewaest 14', 60'; Vanzeir 83'; Nygren (yellow card) 88'		Schoofs (yellow card) 65'; Engvall (yellow card) 66'; Bijker (yellow card) 88'; Van Cleemput (yellow card) 90+1'	Stadium: Luminus Arena; Attendance: 14,160; Referee: Lawrence Visser

=== UEFA Champions League ===
==== Group stage ====
Pos	Team	Pld	W	D	L	GF	GA	GD	Pts	Qualification	LIV	NAP	SAL	GNK
1	(England) Liverpool	6	4	1	1	13	8	+5	13	Advance to knockout phase	—	1–1	4–3	2–1
2	(Italy) Napoli	6	3	3	0	11	4	+7	12	Advance to knockout phase	2–0	—	1–1	4–0
3	(Austria) Red Bull Salzburg	6	2	1	3	16	13	+3	7	Transfer to Europa League	0–2	2–3	—	6–2
4	(Belgium) Genk	6	0	1	5	5	20	−15	1		1–4	0–0	1–4	—

Source: UEFA
Rules for classification: Group stage tiebreakers

17 September 2019 1	Red Bull Salzburg (Austria)	6–2	(Belgium) Genk	Wals-Siezenheim, Austria
21:00 CEST (UTC+2)	Haaland 2', 34', 45'; Hwang 36'; Szoboszlai 45+2', (yellow card) 62'; Nissen (yellow card) 47'; Bernède (yellow card) 50'; Ulmer 66'	Report	Lucumí 40'; Samatta 52', (yellow card) 83'; Bongonda (yellow card) 58'	Stadium: Stadion Wals-Siezenheim; Attendance: 29,520; Referee: Felix Zwayer (Germany)

2 October 2019 2	Genk (Belgium)	0–0	(Italy) Napoli	Genk, Belgium
18:55 CEST (UTC+2)	Ito (yellow card) 50'	Report	Milik (yellow card) 65'; Fabián (yellow card) 78'	Stadium: Luminus Arena; Attendance: 19,962; Referee: István Kovács (Romania)

23 October 2019 3	Genk (Belgium)	1–4	(England) Liverpool	Genk, Belgium
21:00 CEST (UTC+2)	Odey (yellow card) 84', (goal) 88'	Report	Oxlade-Chamberlain 2', 57'; Gomez (yellow card) 70'; Mané 77'; Salah 87'	Stadium: Luminus Arena; Attendance: 19,626; Referee: Slavko Vinčić (Slovenia)

5 November 2019 4	Liverpool (England)	2–1	(Belgium) Genk	Liverpool, England
21:00 CET (UTC+1)	Wijnaldum 14'; Oxlade-Chamberlain 53'	Report	Lucumí (yellow card) 22'; Samatta 40'; De Norre (yellow card) 83'	Stadium: Anfield; Attendance: 52,611; Referee: Ivan Kružliak (Slovakia)

27 November 2019 5	Genk (Belgium)	1–4	(Austria) Red Bull Salzburg	Genk, Belgium
21:00 CET (UTC+1)	Samatta (yellow card) 74', (goal) 85'	Report	Junuzović (yellow card) 21'; Daka 43'; Minamino 45'; Kristensen (yellow card) 46'; Hwang 69'; Haaland 87'	Stadium: Luminus Arena; Attendance: 17,284; Referee: Mattias Gestranius (Finland)

10 December 2019 6	Napoli (Italy)	4–0	(Belgium) Genk	Naples, Italy
18:55 CET (UTC+1)	Milik 3', 26', 38' (pen.); Mertens 74' (pen.); Mário Rui (yellow card) 80'; Koulibaly (yellow card) 87'	Report	Vandevoordt (yellow card) 37'; De Norre (yellow card) 74'; Paintsil (yellow card) 89'	Stadium: Stadio San Paolo; Attendance: 22,265; Referee: Cüneyt Çakır (Turkey)

== Statistics ==
=== Squad appearances and goals ===
Last updated on 7 March 2020.

No.	Pos	Nat	Player	Total		Belgian Division		Belgian Cup		Belgian Super Cup		UEFA Champions League	
No.	Pos	Nat	Player	Apps	Goals	Apps	Goals	Apps	Goals	Apps	Goals	Apps	Goals
Goalkeepers
1	GK	(Australia) AUS	Danny Vukovic	2	0	1	0	0	0	1	0	0	0
26	GK	(Belgium) BEL	Maarten Vandevoordt	7	0	4	0	2	0	0	0	1	0
28	GK	(Belgium) BEL	Gaëtan Coucke	23	0	18	0	0	0	0	0	5	0
30	GK	(France) FRA	Thomas Didillon	6	0	6	0	0	0	0	0	0	0
40	GK	(Belgium) BEL	Tobe Leysen	0	0	0	0	0	0	0	0	0	0
Defenders
2	DF	(Belgium) BEL	Casper de Norre	19	0	10+3	0	1+1	0	1	0	3	0
5	DF	(Brazil) BRA	Neto Borges	7	0	3+2	0	1	0	0	0	0+1	0
6	DF	(Belgium) BEL	Sébastien Dewaest	31	5	24	3	2	0	1	2	4	0
21	DF	(Finland) FIN	Jere Uronen	21	0	17	0	0	0	1	0	3	0
31	DF	(Denmark) DEN	Joakim Mæhle	33	1	23+2	0	2	1	0	0	6	0
33	DF	(Colombia) COL	Jhon Lucumí	29	2	21+1	1	1	0	0	0	6	1
35	DF	(Belgium) BEL	Shawn Adewoye	0	0	0	0	0	0	0	0	0	0
46	DF	(Colombia) COL	Carlos Cuesta	27	0	20	0	2	0	1	0	4	0
Midfielders
4	MF	(Belgium) BEL	Dries Wouters	15	1	9+4	1	1+1	0	0	0	0	0
8	MF	(Belgium) BEL	Bryan Heynen	20	2	11+3	1	1	1	1	0	3+1	0
17	MF	(Slovakia) SVK	Patrik Hrošovský	27	1	16+5	1	1	0	0	0	5	0
20	MF	(Norway) NOR	Mats Møller Dæhli	3	1	2+1	1	0	0	0	0	0	0
22	MF	(Belgium) BEL	Bryan Limbombe	5	0	0+5	0	0	0	0	0	0	0
38	MF	(Ivory Coast) CIV	Eboue Kouassi	4	0	3+1	0	0	0	0	0	0	0
42	MF	(Norway) NOR	Kristian Thorstvedt	8	1	5+3	1	0	0	0	0	0	0
Forwards
7	FW	(Japan) JPN	Junya Ito	38	6	26+3	5	0+2	1	1	0	6	0
11	FW	(Ghana) GHA	Joseph Paintsil	23	1	10+8	1	1+1	0	0	0	2+1	0
14	FW	(Sweden) SWE	Benjamin Nygren	4	1	2	1	1	0	0+1	0	0	0
15	FW	(Nigeria) NGR	Stephen Odey	13	2	1+10	0	1	1	0	0	0+1	1
18	FW	(Nigeria) NGR	Paul Onuachu	28	10	17+5	9	1	1	0	0	2+3	0
27	FW	(Belgium) BEL	Theo Bongonda	29	5	15+7	5	0+1	0	0	0	2+4	0
Players who have made an appearance this season but have left the club
10	FW	(Tanzania) TAN	Mbwana Samatta	28	10	17+3	7	1	0	1	0	6	3
16	FW	(Belgium) BEL	Dante Vanzeir	1	1	0	0	0	0	0+1	1	0	0
19	MF	(Poland) POL	Jakub Piotrowski	8	0	4+2	0	0+1	0	1	0	0	0
23	MF	(Romania) ROU	Ianis Hagi	19	3	6+8	3	0	0	0	0	1+4	0
25	MF	(Norway) NOR	Sander Berge	31	1	22+1	1	1	0	1	0	6	0
29	FW	(Belgium) BEL	Manuel Benson	4	0	1+2	0	0	0	1	0	0	0
54	MF	(Romania) ROU	Vladimir Screciu	0	0	0	0	0	0	0	0	0	0
77	MF	(Democratic Republic of the Congo) COD	Dieumerci Ndongala	17	0	5+6	0	2	0	0+1	0	1+2	0
