= 2018–19 KRC Genk season =

Genk
2018–19 season
- Chairman: Peter Croonen
- Head coach: Philippe Clement
- Stadium: Luminus Arena
- Belgian First Division A: 1st (champions)
- Belgian Cup: Quarter-finals
- UEFA Europa League: Round of 32
- Top goalscorer: League: Mbwana Samatta (23); All: Mbwana Samatta (32)
| Home colours | Away colours | Third colours |

The 2018–19 K.R.C. Genk season was the club's 31st season in existence and the 24th consecutive season in the top flight of Belgian football. In addition to the domestic league, Genk participated in this season's edition of the Belgian Cup and the UEFA Europa League. The season covered the period from 1 July 2018 to 30 June 2019.

== Players ==
=== First-team squad ===
As of 31 January 2019

Note: Flags indicate national team as defined under FIFA eligibility rules; some limited exceptions apply. Players may hold more than one non-FIFA nationality.

| No. | Pos. | Nation | Player |
|---|---|---|---|
| 1 | GK | AUS | Danny Vukovic |
| 2 | DF | BEL | Casper de Norre |
| 4 | MF | BEL | Dries Wouters |
| 5 | DF | BRA | Neto Borges |
| 6 | DF | BEL | Sébastien Dewaest |
| 7 | MF | JPN | Junya Ito (on loan from Kashiwa Reysol) |
| 9 | FW | DEN | Marcus Ingvartsen |
| 10 | FW | TAN | Mbwana Samatta |
| 11 | MF | GHA | Joseph Paintsil |
| 14 | MF | BEL | Leandro Trossard (captain) |
| 18 | MF | UKR | Ruslan Malinovskyi |
| 19 | MF | POL | Jakub Piotrowski |
| 20 | MF | CRO | Ivan Fiolić |

| No. | Pos. | Nation | Player |
|---|---|---|---|
| 21 | DF | FIN | Jere Uronen |
| 23 | DF | BEL | Rubin Seigers |
| 25 | MF | NOR | Sander Berge |
| 26 | GK | BEL | Maarten Vandevoordt |
| 28 | MF | BEL | Bryan Heynen |
| 30 | GK | BEL | Nordin Jackers |
| 31 | DF | DEN | Joakim Mæhle |
| 33 | DF | COL | Jhon Lucumí |
| 45 | DF | GHA | Joseph Aidoo |
| 54 | MF | ROU | Vladimir Screciu |
| 77 | MF | COD | Dieumerci Ndongala |
| 93 | FW | BEL | Zinho Gano |
| — | MF | CIV | Pierre Zebli |

=== Out on loan ===
Note: Flags indicate national team as defined under FIFA eligibility rules; some limited exceptions apply. Players may hold more than one non-FIFA nationality.

| No. | Pos. | Nation | Player |
|---|---|---|---|
| 3 | DF | BIH | Bojan Nastić (at Oostende until 30 June 2019) |
| 8 | MF | KOS | Edon Zhegrova (at Basel until 30 June 2020) |
| 15 | MF | SEN | Ibrahima Seck (at Zulte Waregem until 30 June 2019) |
| 16 | MF | BEL | Dante Vanzeir (at Beerschot Wilrijk until 30 June 2019) |
| 29 | MF | BEL | Manuel Benson (at Mouscron until 30 June 2019) |

| No. | Pos. | Nation | Player |
|---|---|---|---|
| 40 | GK | BEL | Gaëtan Coucke (at Lommel until 30 June 2019) |
| — | DF | MAR | Amine Khammas (at Den Bosch until 30 June 2019) |
| — | DF | CZE | Jakub Brabec (at Viktoria Plzeň until 30 June 2019) |
| — | FW | GRE | Nikos Karelis (at PAOK until 30 June 2019) |

== Competitions ==
=== Overview ===
| Competition | First match | Last match | Starting round | Final position | Record | | | | | | | |
| Competition | First match | Last match | Starting round | Final position | Pld | W | D | L | GF | GA | GD | Win % |
|---|---|---|---|---|---|---|---|---|---|---|---|---|
| Belgian First Division A | 29 July 2018 | 19 May 2019 | Matchday 1 | Winners | 40 | 24 | 11 | 5 | 72 | 39 | +33 | 60.00 |
| Belgian Cup | 26 September 2018 | 19 December 2018 | Sixth round | Quarter-finals | 3 | 2 | 1 | 0 | 9 | 3 | +6 | 66.67 |
| UEFA Europa League | 26 July 2018 | 21 February 2019 | Second qualifying round | Round of 32 | 14 | 9 | 3 | 2 | 37 | 18 | +19 | 64.29 |
| Total | | | | | 57 | 35 | 15 | 7 | 118 | 60 | +58 | 61.40 |

Source: Soccerway

=== Belgian First Division A ===
==== Regular season ====
| Pos | Team | Pld | W | D | L | GF | GA | GD | Pts | Qualification or relegation |
|---|---|---|---|---|---|---|---|---|---|---|
| 1 | Genk | 30 | 18 | 9 | 3 | 63 | 31 | +32 | 63 | Qualification for the championship play-offs |
| 2 | Club Brugge | 30 | 16 | 8 | 6 | 64 | 32 | +32 | 56 | Qualification for the championship play-offs |
| 3 | Standard Liège | 30 | 15 | 8 | 7 | 49 | 35 | +14 | 53 | Qualification for the championship play-offs |
| 4 | Anderlecht | 30 | 15 | 6 | 9 | 49 | 34 | +15 | 51 | Qualification for the championship play-offs |
| 5 | Gent | 30 | 15 | 5 | 10 | 53 | 45 | +8 | 50 | Qualification for the championship play-offs |

Source: Belgian First Division A (in Dutch), Soccerway
Rules for classification: 1) Points; 2) Matches won; 3) Goal difference; 4) Goals scored; 5) Away goals scored; 6) Away matches won; 7) Play-off.

==== Results summary ====
| Overall | | | | | | | | Home | | | | | | Away | | | | | |
| Pld | W | D | L | GF | GA | GD | Pts | W | D | L | GF | GA | GD | W | D | L | GF | GA | GD |
|---|---|---|---|---|---|---|---|---|---|---|---|---|---|---|---|---|---|---|---|
| 30 | 18 | 9 | 3 | 63 | 31 | +32 | 63 | 9 | 4 | 2 | 26 | 12 | +14 | 9 | 5 | 1 | 37 | 19 | +18 |

Source: Jupiler Pro League

==== Results by round ====
| Round | 1 | 2 | 3 | 4 | 5 | 6 | 7 | 8 | 9 | 10 | 11 | 12 | 13 | 14 | 15 | 16 | 17 | 18 | 19 | 20 | 21 | 22 | 23 | 24 | 25 | 26 | 27 | 28 | 29 | 30 |
|---|---|---|---|---|---|---|---|---|---|---|---|---|---|---|---|---|---|---|---|---|---|---|---|---|---|---|---|---|---|---|
| Ground | A | H | A | H | H | A | H | A | H | A | H | A | A | H | A | H | A | H | H | A | H | A | H | A | H | A | H | A | H | A |
| Result | W | D | W | W | W | D | W | W | W | W | W | D | W | D | D | L | W | D | W | W | W | W | L | W | W | L | D | D | W | D |
| Position | 1 | 3 | 3 | 2 | 1 | 2 | 2 | 2 | 2 | 1 | 1 | 1 | 1 | 1 | 1 | | | | | | | | | | | | | | | |

Source: Jupiler Pro League
A = Away; H = Home; W = Win; D = Draw; L = Loss

==== Matches ====
The league fixtures were announced on 12 June 2018.

| 29 July 2018 1 | Lokeren | 0–4 | Genk | Lokeren |
| 20:00 CEST (UTC+2) | | | | Stadium: Daknamstadion |

| 5 August 2018 2 | Genk | 1–1 | Sint-Truiden | Genk |
| 18:00 CEST (UTC+2) | | | | Stadium: Luminus Arena |

| 12 August 2018 3 | Oostende | 0–2 | Genk | Ostend |
| 14:30 CEST (UTC+2) | | | | Stadium: Versluys Arena |

| 19 August 2018 4 | Genk | 3–1 | Charleroi | Genk |
| 18:00 CEST (UTC+2) | | | | Stadium: Luminus Arena |

| 26 August 2018 5 | Genk | 3–2 | Waasland-Beveren | Genk |
| 20:00 CEST (UTC+2) | | | | Stadium: Luminus Arena |

| 2 September 2018 6 | Kortrijk | 3–3 | Genk | Kortrijk |
| 20:00 CEST (UTC+2) | | | | Stadium: Guldensporen Stadion |

| 15 September 2018 7 | Genk | 1–0 | Anderlecht | Genk |
| 20:30 CEST (UTC+2) | | | | Stadium: Luminus Arena |

| 23 September 2018 8 | Cercle Brugge | 2–5 | Genk | Bruges |
| 20:00 CEST (UTC+2) | | | | Stadium: Jan Breydel Stadium |

| 29 September 2018 9 | Genk | 4–0 | Zulte Waregem | Genk |
| 18:00 CEST (UTC+2) | | | | Stadium: Luminus Arena |

| 7 October 2018 10 | Gent | 1–5 | Genk | Ghent |
| 20:00 CEST (UTC+2) | | | | Stadium: Ghelamco Arena |

| 20 October 2018 11 | Genk | 2–1 | Eupen | Genk |
| 20:30 CEST (UTC+2) | | | | Stadium: Luminus Arena |

| 28 October 2018 12 | Standard Liège | 1–1 | Genk | Liège |
| 15:30 CEST (UTC+2) | | | | Stadium: Stade Maurice Dufrasne |

| 31 October 2018 13 | Antwerp | 2–4 | Genk | Antwerp |
| 21:30 CET (UTC+1) | | | | Stadium: Bosuilstadion |

| 3 November 2018 14 | Genk | 1–1 | Club Brugge | Genk |
| 19:00 CET (UTC+1) | | | | Stadium: Luminus Arena |

| 11 November 2018 15 | Excel Mouscron | 0–0 | Genk | Mouscron |
| 21:00 CET (UTC+1) | | | | Stadium: Stade Le Canonnier |

| 24 November 2018 16 | Genk | 1–2 | Cercle Brugge | Genk |
| 21:30 CET (UTC+1) | | | | Stadium: Luminus Arena |

| 2 December 2018 17 | Anderlecht | 0–1 | Genk | Anderlecht |
| 19:00 CET (UTC+1) | | | | Stadium: Constant Vanden Stock Stadium |

| 8 December 2018 18 | Genk | 1–1 | Kortrijk | Genk |
| 19:00 CET (UTC+1) | | | | Stadium: Luminus Arena |

| 16 December 2018 19 | Genk | 2–0 | Oostende | Genk |
| 19:00 CET (UTC+1) | | | | Stadium: Luminus Arena |

| 23 December 2018 20 | Eupen | 0–2 | Genk | Eupen |
| 19:00 CET (UTC+1) | | | | Stadium: Kehrweg Stadion |

| 26 December 2018 21 | Genk | 3–1 | Gent | Genk |
| 21:30 CET (UTC+1) | | | | Stadium: Luminus Arena |

| 18 January 2019 22 | Sint-Truiden | 2–3 | Genk | Sint-Truiden |
| 21:35 CET (UTC+1) | | | | Stadium: Stayen |

| 26 January 2019 23 | Genk | 1–2 | Excel Mouscron | Genk |
| 21:30 CET (UTC+1) | | | | Stadium: Luminus Arena |

| 2 February 2019 24 | Waasland-Beveren | 1–2 | Genk | Beveren |
| 21:30 CET (UTC+1) | | | | Stadium: Freethiel Stadion |

| 8 February 2019 25 | Genk | 2–0 | Standard Liège | Genk |
| 21:30 CET (UTC+1) | | | | Stadium: Luminus Arena |

| 17 February 2019 26 | Club Brugge | 3–1 | Genk | Bruges |
| 15:30 CET (UTC+1) | | | | Stadium: Jan Breydel Stadium |

| 24 February 2019 27 | Genk | 0–0 | Antwerp | Genk |
| 21:30 CET (UTC+1) | | | | Stadium: Luminus Arena |

| 2 March 2019 28 | Charleroi | 1–1 | Genk | Charleroi |
| 19:00 CET (UTC+1) | | | | Stadium: Stade du Pays de Charleroi |

| 10 March 2019 29 | Genk | 1–0 | Lokeren | Genk |
| 19:00 CET (UTC+1) | | | | Stadium: Luminus Arena |

| 17 March 2019 30 | Zulte Waregem | 3–3 | Genk | Waregem |
| 19:00 CET (UTC+1) | | | | Stadium: Regenboogstadion |

==== Championship play-offs ====
| Pos | Team | Pld | W | D | L | GF | GA | GD | Pts | Qualification |
|---|---|---|---|---|---|---|---|---|---|---|
| 1 | Genk (C) | 10 | 6 | 2 | 2 | 19 | 8 | +11 | 52 | Qualification for the Champions League group stage |
| 2 | Club Brugge | 10 | 7 | 1 | 2 | 19 | 11 | +8 | 50 | Qualification for the Champions League third qualifying round |
| 3 | Standard Liège | 10 | 4 | 1 | 5 | 17 | 16 | +1 | 40 | Qualification for the Europa League group stage |
| 4 | Antwerp (O) | 10 | 4 | 2 | 4 | 12 | 16 | −4 | 39 | Qualification for the Europa League play-off Final |
| 5 | Gent | 10 | 3 | 1 | 6 | 10 | 15 | −5 | 35 | Qualification for the Europa League second qualifying round |
| 6 | Anderlecht | 10 | 1 | 3 | 6 | 8 | 19 | −11 | 32 | |

Source: Sport.be
Rules for classification: 1) Points; 2) Points without (possible) half points added due to rounding; 3) Position obtained during the Regular season
(C) Champions; (O) Play-off winners

==== Results summary ====
| Overall | | | | | | | | Home | | | | | | Away | | | | | |
| Pld | W | D | L | GF | GA | GD | Pts | W | D | L | GF | GA | GD | W | D | L | GF | GA | GD |
|---|---|---|---|---|---|---|---|---|---|---|---|---|---|---|---|---|---|---|---|
| 10 | 6 | 2 | 2 | 19 | 8 | +11 | 20 | 4 | 1 | 0 | 12 | 2 | +10 | 2 | 1 | 2 | 7 | 6 | +1 |

Source: Jupiler Pro League

==== Results by round ====
| Round | 1 | 2 | 3 | 4 | 5 | 6 | 7 | 8 | 9 | 10 |
|---|---|---|---|---|---|---|---|---|---|---|
| Ground | H | A | H | H | A | A | H | A | A | H |
| Result | W | L | W | W | W | W | W | L | D | D |
| Position | 1 | 1 | 1 | 1 | 1 | 1 | 1 | 1 | 1 | 1 |

Source: Jupiler Pro League
A = Away; H = Home; W = Win; D = Draw; L = Loss

==== Matches ====
| 30 March 2019 1 | Genk | 3–0 | Anderlecht | Genk |
| 21:30 CEST (UTC+2) | | | | Stadium: Luminus Arena |

| 2 April 2019 2 | Antwerp | 1–0 | Genk | Antwerp |
| 20:30 CET (UTC+1) | | | | Stadium: Bosuilstadion |

| 6 April 2019 3 | Genk | 2–1 | Gent | Genk |
| 20:30 CEST (UTC+2) | | | | Stadium: Luminus Arena |

| 14 April 2019 4 | Genk | 3–1 | Club Brugge | Genk |
| 18:00 CEST (UTC+2) | | | | Stadium: Luminus Arena |

| 19 April 2019 5 | Standard Liège | 1–3 | Genk | Liège |
| 20:30 CEST (UTC+2) | | | | Stadium: Stade Maurice Dufrasne |

| 27 April 2019 6 | Gent | 0–1 | Genk | Ghent |
| 20:30 CEST (UTC+2) | | | | Stadium: Ghelamco Arena |

| 3 May 2019 7 | Genk | 4–0 | Antwerp | Genk |
| 20:30 CEST (UTC+2) | | | | Stadium: Luminus Arena |

| 12 May 2019 8 | Club Brugge | 3–2 | Genk | Bruges |
| 18:00 CET (UTC+1) | | | | Stadium: Jan Breydel Stadium |

| 16 May 2019 9 | Anderlecht | 1–1 | Genk | Anderlecht |
| 20:30 CET (UTC+1) | | | | Stadium: Constant Vanden Stock Stadium |

| 19 May 2019 10 | Genk | 0–0 | Standard Liège | Genk |
| 18:00 CEST (UTC+2) | | | | Stadium: Luminus Arena |

=== Belgian Cup ===
| 26 September 2018 Sixth round | Genk | 4–0 | Lommel | Genk |
| 20:00 CEST (UTC+2) | | | | Stadium: Luminus Arena |

| 5 December 2018 Seventh round | Charleroi | 1–3 | Genk | Charleroi |
| 20:45 CET (UTC+1) | Gholizadeh 35' | | Dewaest 54'; Mæhle 76'; Gano 90+3' | Stadium: Stade du Pays de Charleroi |

| 19 December 2018 Quarter-finals | Union SG | 2–2 (a.e.t.) (4–3 p) | Genk | Forest |
| 20:45 CET (UTC+1) | Tau 18'; Ferber 71' | | Gano 48', 76' | Stadium: Stade Joseph Marien; Attendance: 6,217; Referee: Erik Lambrechts |

=== UEFA Europa League ===
==== Second qualifying round ====
| 26 July 2018 First leg | Genk (Belgium) | 5–0 | (Luxembourg) Fola Esch | Genk, Belgium |
| 20:00 CEST (UTC+2) | | | | Stadium: Luminus Arena |

| 1 August 2018 Second leg | Fola Esch (Luxembourg) | 1–4 (1–9 agg.) | (Belgium) Genk | Esch-sur-Alzette, Luxembourg |
| 18:00 CEST (UTC+2) | | | | Stadium: Stade Émile Mayrisch |

==== Third qualifying round ====
| 9 August 2018 First leg | Genk (Belgium) | 2–0 | (Poland) Lech Poznań | Genk, Belgium |
| 20:00 CEST (UTC+2) | | | | Stadium: Luminus Arena |

| 16 August 2018 Second leg | Lech Poznań (Poland) | 1–2 (1–4 agg.) | (Belgium) Genk | Poznań, Poland |
| 18:00 CEST (UTC+2) | | | | Stadium: Stadion Miejski |

==== Third qualifying round ====
| 23 August 2018 First leg | Genk (Belgium) | 5–2 | (Denmark) Brøndby | Genk, Belgium |
| 20:30 CEST (UTC+2) | | | | Stadium: Luminus Arena |

| 30 August 2018 Second leg | Brøndby (Denmark) | 2–4 (4–9 agg.) | (Belgium) Genk | Brøndbyvester, Denmark |
| 20:30 CEST (UTC+2) | | | | Stadium: Brøndby Stadium |

==== Group stage ====
The draw for the group stage was held on 31 August 2018.

| Pos | Team | Pld | W | D | L | GF | GA | GD | Pts | Qualification | GNK | MAL | BES | SRP |
|---|---|---|---|---|---|---|---|---|---|---|---|---|---|---|
| 1 | (Belgium) Genk | 6 | 3 | 2 | 1 | 14 | 8 | +6 | 11 | Advance to knockout phase | — | 2–0 | 1–1 | 4–0 |
| 2 | (Sweden) Malmö FF | 6 | 2 | 3 | 1 | 7 | 6 | +1 | 9 | Advance to knockout phase | 2–2 | — | 2–0 | 1–1 |
| 3 | (Turkey) Beşiktaş | 6 | 2 | 1 | 3 | 9 | 11 | −2 | 7 | | 2–4 | 0–1 | — | 3–1 |
| 4 | (Norway) Sarpsborg 08 | 6 | 1 | 2 | 3 | 8 | 13 | −5 | 5 | | 3–1 | 1–1 | 2–3 | — |

Source: UEFA
Rules for classification: Group stage tiebreakers

| 20 September 2018 1 | Genk (Belgium) | 2–0 | (Sweden) Malmö FF | Genk, Belgium |
| 18:55 | Trossard 37'; Samatta 71' | Report | | Stadium: Luminus Arena; Attendance: 11,590; Referee: Aleksei Eskov (Russia) |

| 4 October 2018 2 | Sarpsborg 08 (Norway) | 3–1 | (Belgium) Genk | Sarpsborg, Norway |
| 21:00 | Mortensen 6', 63'; Zachariassen 54' | Report | Trossard 49' | Stadium: Sarpsborg Stadion; Attendance: 7,885; Referee: Ivan Bebek (Croatia) |

| 25 October 2018 3 | Beşiktaş (Turkey) | 2–4 | (Belgium) Genk | Istanbul, Turkey |
| 21:00 (22:00 TRT) | Vágner Love 74', 86' | Report | Samatta 23', 70'; Ndongala 81'; Piotrowski 83' | Stadium: Vodafone Park; Attendance: 25,209; Referee: Daniel Stefański (Poland) |

| 8 November 2018 4 | Genk (Belgium) | 1–1 | (Turkey) Beşiktaş | Genk, Belgium |
| 18:55 | Berge 87' | Report | Quaresma 16' | Stadium: Luminus Arena; Attendance: 14,292; Referee: Tobias Stieler (Germany) |

| 29 November 2018 5 | Malmö FF (Sweden) | 2–2 | (Belgium) Genk | Malmö, Sweden |
| 21:00 | Lewicki 65'; Antonsson 67' | Report | Pozuelo 42'; Paintsil 53' | Stadium: Stadion; Attendance: 16,117; Referee: Srđan Jovanović (Serbia) |

| 13 December 2018 6 | Genk (Belgium) | 4–0 | (Norway) Sarpsborg 08 | Genk, Belgium |
| 18:55 | Gano 3'; Paintsil 5'; Berge 64'; Aidoo 67' | Report | | Stadium: Luminus Arena; Attendance: 12,240; Referee: István Kovács (Romania) |

==== Knockout phase ====
===== Round of 32 =====
The draw for the round of 32 was held on 17 December 2018.

| 14 February 2019 First leg | Slavia Prague (Czech Republic) | 0–0 | (Belgium) Genk | Prague, Czech Republic |
| 18:55 | | Report | | Stadium: Sinobo Stadium; Attendance: 18,125; Referee: Andris Treimanis (Latvia) |

| 21 February 2019 Second leg | Genk (Belgium) | 1–4 (1–4 agg.) | (Czech Republic) Slavia Prague | Genk, Belgium |
| 21:00 | Trossard 10' | Report | Coufal 23'; Traoré 54'; Škoda 64', 69' | Stadium: Luminus Arena; Attendance: 13,688; Referee: Bobby Madden (Scotland) |
