= Sébastien Dewaest =

Belgian footballer (born 1991)

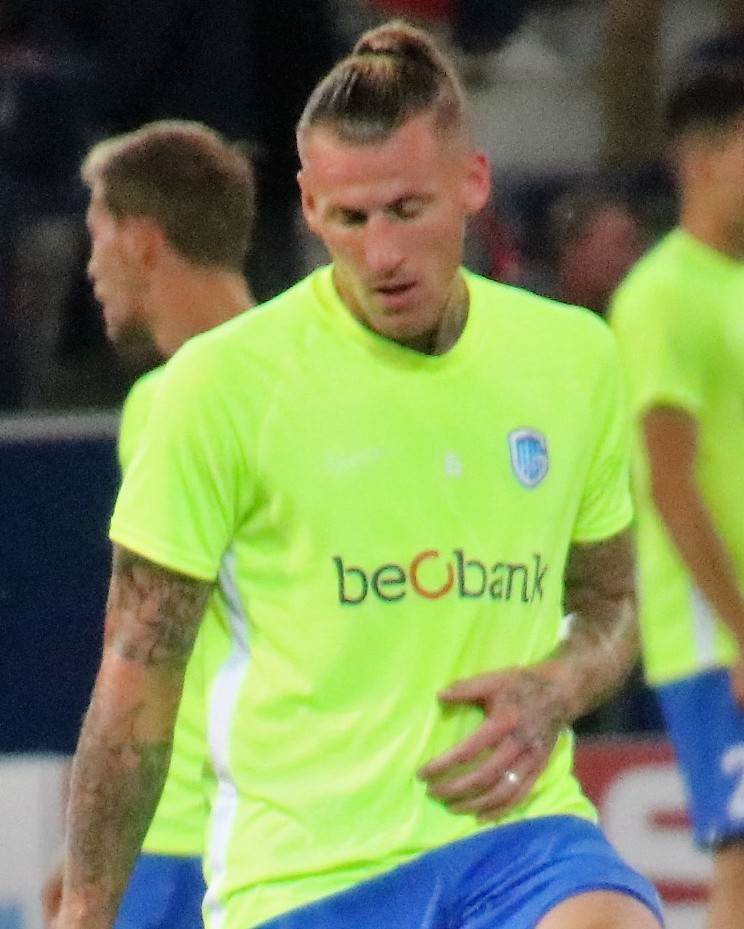
- Dewaest with Genk in 2019

Personal information
- Date of birth: 27 May 1991 (age 35)
- Place of birth: Poperinge, Belgium
- Height: 1.88 m (6 ft 2 in)
- Position: Centre-back

Team information
- Current team: Jong Genk (assistant coach)

Youth career
- –2011: Lille

Senior career*
Years	Team	Apps	(Gls)
2010–2011	Lille II	2	(0)
2011–2013	Roeselare	59	(4)
2013–2015	Charleroi	74	(8)
2015–2023	Genk	123	(9)
2021	→ Toulouse (loan)	16	(0)
2021–2022	→ OH Leuven (loan)	28	(0)
2022–2023	Jong Genk	2	(0)
2023–2024	AEL Limassol	26	(1)
2024–2026	Francs Borains	26	(0)

International career
2007	Belgium U16	3	(0)
2007–2008	Belgium U17	10	(2)
2008	Belgium U18	1	(0)
2009–2010	Belgium U19	4	(0)

Managerial career
- 2026–: Jong Genk (assistant)
- * Club domestic league appearances and goals

Sébastien Dewaest (born 27 May 1991) is a Belgian professional football coach and a former centre-back who is an assistant coach with Jong Genk.

== Club career ==
Dewaest comes from youth academy of Lille. In January 2011 he signed a professional contract with Roeselare. In his debut season he came in five games. In his second season, he played 22 league games in which he scored a goal. During 2012–13 season he scored four goals in 31 matches. In April 2013 Charleroi signed Dewaest. He signed a two-year contract with an option in two additional years.

In August 2024, Dewaest signed a one-year contract with Challenger Pro League club Francs Borains.

== Coaching career ==
On 2 July 2026, Dewaest returned to Genk as an assistant coach for their reserves team Jong Genk.

== Career statistics ==
As of match played 30 August 2024

Appearances and goals by club, season and competition
Club	Season	League			National cup		League cup		Continental		Other		Total	
Club	Season	Division	Apps	Goals	Apps	Goals	Apps	Goals	Apps	Goals	Apps	Goals	Apps	Goals
Roeselare	2010–11	Belgian First Division B	5	0	—		—		—		—		5	0
Roeselare	2011–12	Belgian Second Division	23	0	1	0	—		—		—		24	0
Roeselare	2012–13	Belgian Second Division	31	4	0	0	—		—		—		31	4
Roeselare	Total		59	4	1	0	—		—		—		60	4
Charleroi	2013–14	Belgian Pro League	31	5	1	0	—		—		—		32	5
Charleroi	2014–15	Belgian Pro League	40	3	4	0	—		—		—		44	3
Charleroi	2015–16	Belgian Pro League	3	0	—		—		4	0	—		7	0
Charleroi	Total		74	8	5	0	—		4	0	—		83	8
Genk	2015–16	Belgian Pro League	38	2	4	1	—		—		—		42	3
Genk	2016–17	Belgian First Division A	21	0	5	0	—		9	1	—		35	1
Genk	2017–18	Belgian First Division A	6	0	1	0	—		—		—		7	0
Genk	2018–19	Belgian First Division A	34	4	3	1	—		13	2	—		50	7
Genk	2019–20	Belgian First Division A	24	3	2	0	—		4	0	1	2	31	5
Genk	2022–23	Belgian First Division A	0	0	0	0	—		—		—		0	0
Genk	Total		123	9	15	2	—		26	3	1	2	165	16
Toulouse (loan)	2020–21	Ligue 1	16	0	1	0	0	0	—		—		17	0
OH Leuven (loan)	2021–22	Belgian First Division A	28	0	3	0	—		—		—		31	0
AEL Limassol	2022–23	Cypriot First Division	12	1	5	1	—		—		—		17	2
AEL Limassol	2023–24	Cypriot First Division	14	0	0	0	—		—		—		14	0
AEL Limassol	Total		26	1	5	1	—		—		—		31	2
Francs Borains	2024–25	Cypriot First Division	2	0	0	0	—		—		—		2	0
Career total			328	22	30	3	0	0	30	3	1	2	389	30

== Honours ==
Genk

- Belgian First Division A: 2018–19
- Belgian Super Cup: 2019
