= Jere Uronen =

Finnish footballer (born 1994)

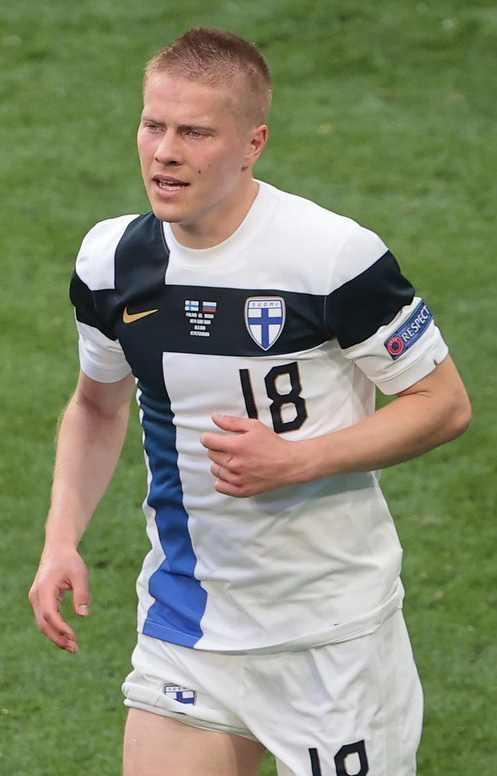
- Uronen playing with Finland in the UEFA Euro 2020

Personal information
- Full name: Jere Juhani Uronen
- Date of birth: 13 July 1994 (age 32)
- Place of birth: Turku, Finland
- Height: 1.77 m (5 ft 10 in)
- Position: Full-back

Team information
- Current team: Atromitos
- Number: 21

Youth career
- –2010: TPS

Senior career*
Years	Team	Apps	(Gls)
2010–2011	TPS	18	(1)
2010–2011	→ ÅIFK	19	(1)
2012–2016	Helsingborg	71	(5)
2016–2021	Genk	134	(3)
2021–2023	Brest	21	(0)
2023	→ Schalke 04 (loan)	11	(0)
2023–2024	Charlotte FC	35	(0)
2025	AIK	8	(0)
2025–	Atromitos	35	(0)

International career^{‡}
2009	Finland U15	4	(0)
2009–2010	Finland U16	16	(1)
2011	Finland U18	15	(0)
2011	Finland U19	4	(0)
2011–2012	Finland U21	5	(0)
2012−	Finland	75	(1)
- * Club domestic league appearances and goals as of 19 September 2026 ‡ National team caps and goals as of 7 September 2025

Jere Juhani Uronen (born 13 July 1994) is a Finnish professional footballer who plays as a full-back for Super League Greece club Atromitos and the Finland national team. He began his senior club career playing for TPS, before signing with Helsingborgs IF at age 17 in 2012.

Uronen made his international debut for Finland in May 2012, at the age of 17 and has since had over 70 caps, including appearing in 2014 and 2018 FIFA World Cup qualifications. He was a regular member of the national team in UEFA Euro 2020 qualification matches and helped Finland secure its first ever place in European Football Championship tournament's group stage.

== Club career ==
=== TPS ===
Born in Turku, Finland, Uronen was raised in the youth ranks of Turun Palloseura (TPS). He made his first team debut in top-tier Veikkausliiga on 12 June 2011, at the age of 16, in a match against FC Haka. On 31 July, he scored his first goal for TPS, in an eventual 4–2 home defeat against FC Honka. He made in total of 18 appearances – one goal – during his debut season.

=== Helsingborg ===
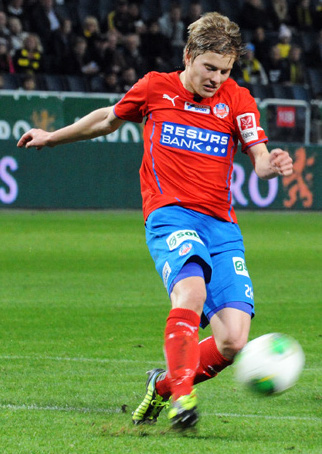
Uronen playing for Helsingborgs IF in 2013

In the early days of 2012 it was announced that Uronen had signed a contract with Helsingborg in the Allsvenskan, for a transfer fee of €700,000. He played his first game for Helsingborg in a friendly match against Dinamo Zagreb on 1 February, playing the full 90 minutes. He made his league debut on 2 April, coming on as a substitute, in a 1–0 away defeat against Norrköping. Uronen won the Svenska Supercupen with Helsingborg in 2012.

=== Genk ===
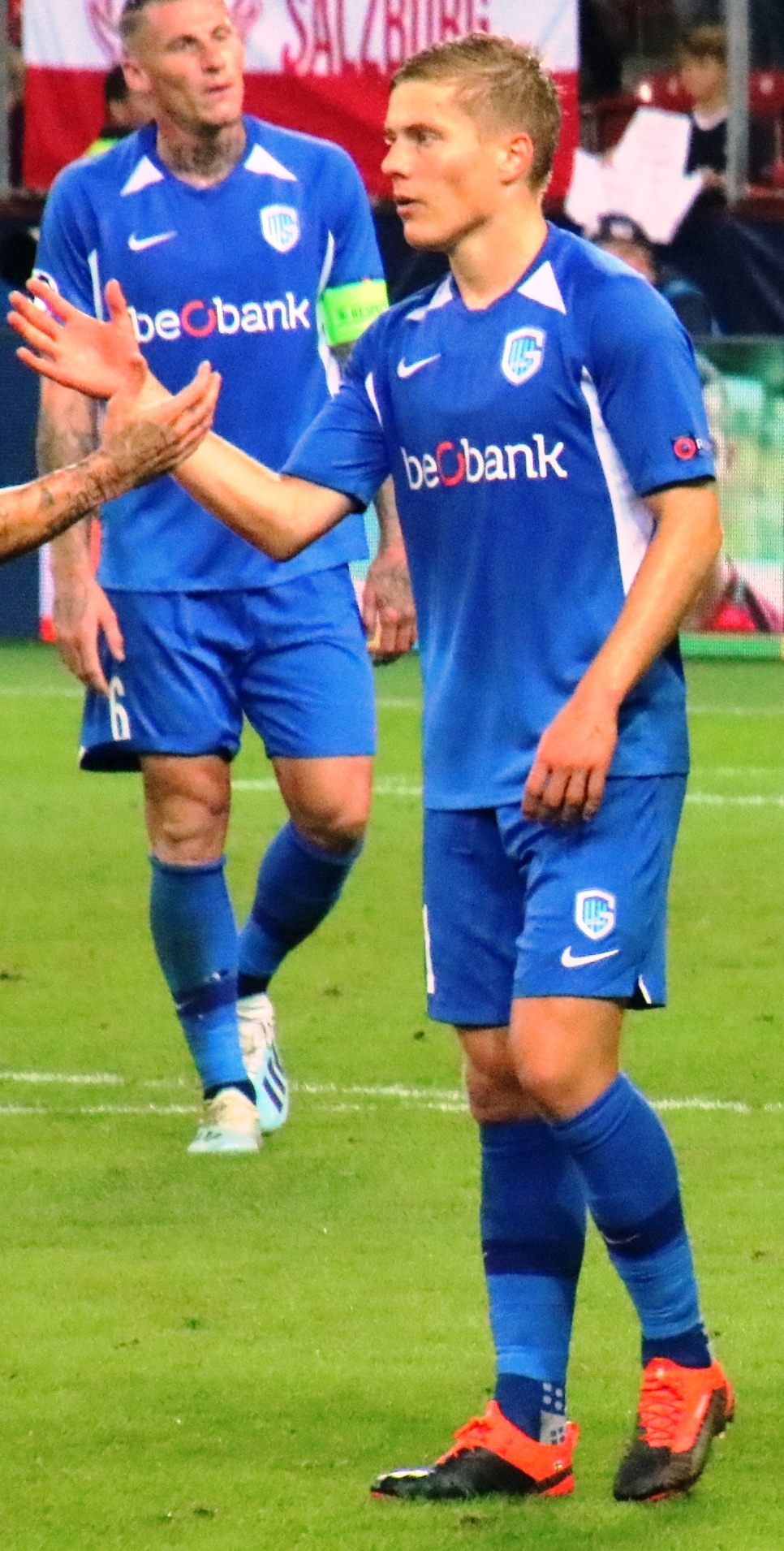
Uronen with Genk in Champions League in 2019

In January 2016, Uronen signed a contract with Belgian club KRC Genk for an undisclosed fee. He made his Belgian First Division A debut on 13 March 2016 in a match against Oostende. Uronen won the Belgian championship title with Genk in the 2018–19 season. They also won the Belgian Cup in 2021, and the Belgian Super Cup in 2019. Uronen represented Genk in the UEFA Champions League group stage in the 2019–20 season, and participated twice in the UEFA Europa League.

=== Brest ===
On 20 July 2021, it was announced that Uronen would join Ligue 1 club Brest, for a €1 million transfer fee. He made his debut on 7 August 2021 playing full 90 minutes in a match against Lyon. He suffered from injuries during his time with Brest.

==== Schalke 04 (loan) ====
On 7 January 2023, Uronen joined German Bundesliga side Schalke 04 on a loan until the end of the season, with an option to make the deal permanent. In the process, he became the second Finnish player in the history of the club, after Teemu Pukki.

=== Charlotte FC ===
On 2 August 2023, Uronen joined Major League Soccer (MLS) side Charlotte FC on a contract until the end of their 2025 season, for a €600,000 transfer fee.

=== AIK ===
On 8 January 2025, Uronen signed with Allsvenskan club AIK for a two-year deal with a one-year option, for an undisclosed fee, making his return to Sweden since playing for Helsingborg between 2012 and 2016. In the media, the transfer fee was estimated to be less than $1 million.

=== Atromitos ===
On 26 July 2025, Uronen joined Super League Greece club Atromitos on a two-year deal.

== International career ==
=== Finland youth teams ===
Uronen was chosen to represent Finland U21 in a qualifying match against Slovenia on 8 August 2011, only at the age of 17.

=== Finland first team ===
On 26 May 2012, Uronen made his debut for the Finland senior national team, playing full minutes in a 3−2 victory over Turkey and so he became the third youngest player in the history of the national team. Uronen made his FIFA World Cup qualification match debut on 12 October 2012 when Mixu Paatelainen chose him to the starting eleven for a match against Georgia. He made his first international goal in a friendly match against Belarus on Tampere Stadium on 9 June 2018.

Uronen was called up for the UEFA Euro 2020 pre-tournament friendly match against Sweden on 29 May 2021. Uronen played in all three international games at the UEFA Euro 2020 tournament. Finland was placed 3rd in Group B following a 2–0 defeat to Belgium on 21 June 2021. They were subsequently knocked out of the tournament.

== Career statistics ==
=== Club ===
As of 28 July 2025

Appearances and goals by club, season and competition
Club	Season	League			Cup		Europe		Other		Total	
Club	Season	Division	Apps	Goals	Apps	Goals	Apps	Goals	Apps	Goals	Apps	Goals
TPS	2010	Veikkausliiga	0	0	0	0	0	0	—		0	0
TPS	2011	Veikkausliiga	18	1	0	0	1 (Note: Appearances in the UEFA Europa League)	0	3 (Note: Appearances in the Finnish League Cup)	0	22	1
TPS	Total		18	1	0	0	1	0	3	0	22	1
ÅIFK (loan)	2010	Kakkonen	13	0	—		—		—		13	0
ÅIFK (loan)	2011	Kakkonen	6	1	—		—		—		6	1
ÅIFK (loan)	Total		19	1	—		—		—		19	1
Helsingborg	2012	Allsvenskan	17	2	1	0	10 (Note: Includes five appearances in the UEFA Champions League, and five appearances in the UEFA Europa League)	0	—		28	2
Helsingborg	2013	Allsvenskan	4	0	3	0	—		—		7	0
Helsingborg	2014	Allsvenskan	24	0	5	1	—		—		29	1
Helsingborg	2015	Allsvenskan	26	3	0	0	—		—		26	3
Helsingborg	Total		71	5	9	1	10	0	—		90	6
Genk	2015–16	Belgian First Division A	12	1	0	0	—		—		12	1
Genk	2016–17	Belgian First Division A	20	0	2	0	13	1	8 (Note: Appearances in the Belgian Europa League play-offs)	1	43	2
Genk	2017–18	Belgian First Division A	23	0	2	0	—		1	1	26	1
Genk	2018–19	Belgian First Division A	31	1	1	0	11	0	—		43	1
Genk	2019–20	Belgian First Division A	17	0	0	0	3 (Note: Appearances in the UEFA Champions League)	0	1 (Note: Appearance in the Belgian Super Cup)	0	21	0
Genk	2020–21	Belgian First Division A	22	0	1	0	—		—		23	0
Genk	2021–22	Belgian First Division A	0	0	0	0	0	0	1	1	1	1
Genk	Total		125	2	6	0	27	1	11	3	169	6
Brest	2021–22	Ligue 1	15	0	2	0	—		—		17	0
Brest	2022–23	Ligue 1	6	0	0	0	—		—		6	0
Brest	Total		21	0	2	0	—		—		23	0
Schalke 04 (loan)	2022–23	Bundesliga	11	0	—		—		—		11	0
Charlotte FC	2023	MLS	9	0	—		—		1 (Note: Appearance(s) in the MLS Cup Playoffs)	0	10	0
Charlotte FC	2024	MLS	26	0	0	0	—		2 (Note: Includes Leagues Cup)	0	28	0
Charlotte FC	Total		35	0	0	0	0	0	3	0	38	0
AIK	2025	Allsvenskan	8	0	0	0	0	0	–		8	0
Atromitos	2025–26	Super League Greece	0	0	0	0	–		–		0	0
Career total			300	9	17	1	38	1	16	3	371	14

=== International ===
As of match played on 21 March 2025

National team	Year	Competitive		Friendly		Total	
National team	Year	Apps	Goals	Apps	Goals	Apps	Goals
Finland	2012	1 (Note: Appearance in the 2014 FIFA World Cup qualification.)	0	3	0	4	0
Finland	2013	0	0	1	0	1	0
Finland	2014	2 (Note: Appearances in the UEFA Euro 2016 qualifying.)	0	2	0	4	0
Finland	2015	6	0	1	0	7	0
Finland	2016	1 (Note: Appearance in the 2018 FIFA World Cup qualification.)	0	4	0	5	0
Finland	2017	3 (Note: Appearances in the 2018 FIFA World Cup qualification)	0	2	0	5	0
Finland	2018	5 (Note: Appearances in the 2018–19 UEFA Nations League)	0	3	1	8	1
Finland	2019	6 (Note: Appearances in the UEFA Euro 2020 qualifying)	0	0	0	6	0
Finland	2020	6 (Note: Appearances in the 2020–21 UEFA Nations League.)	0	1	0	7	0
Finland	2021	7 (Note: Four appearances in the 2022 FIFA World Cup qualification, three appearances in UEFA Euro 2020.)	0	2	0	9	0
Finland	2022	3 (Note: Appearances in the 2022–23 UEFA Nations League.)	0	2	0	5	0
Finland	2023	6 (Note: Appearances in the UEFA Euro 2024 qualifying.)	0	0	0	6	0
Finland	2024	3	0	0	0	3	0
Finland	2025	1	0	0	0	1	0
Total		50	0	21	1	71	1

Notes

Scores and results list Finland's goal tally first, score column indicates score after each Uronen goal.

List of international goals scored by Jere Uronen
No.	Date	Venue	Opponent	Score	Result	Competition
1	9 June 2018	Tampere Stadium, Tampere, Finland	Belarus	1–0	2–0	Friendly

== Honours ==
Helsingborgs IF

- Svenska Supercupen: 2012

Genk

- Belgian First Division A: 2018–19
- Belgian Cup: 2020–21
- Belgian Super Cup: 2019

Individual

- Veikkausliiga September All Star Team: 2011
