= Jhon Lucumí =

Colombian footballer (born 1998)

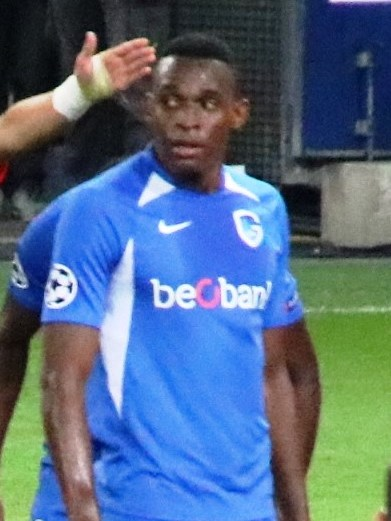
- Lucumí playing for Genk in 2019

Personal information
- Full name: Jhon Janer Lucumí Bonilla
- Date of birth: 26 June 1998 (age 28)
- Place of birth: Cali, Colombia
- Height: 1.87 m (6 ft 2 in)
- Position: Centre-back

Team information
- Current team: Juventus
- Number: 26

Senior career*
| Years | Team | Apps | (Gls) |
| 2015–2018 | Deportivo Cali | 42 | (0) |
| 2018–2022 | Genk | 91 | (2) |
| 2022–2026 | Bologna | 123 | (1) |
| 2026– | Juventus | 4 | (0) |

International career^{‡}
| 2015 | Colombia U17 | 8 | (0) |
| 2019– | Colombia | 43 | (1) |
Medal record
Representing Colombia
Men's football
Copa América
| Runner-up | 2024 United States |
| Third place | 2021 Brazil |
- * Club domestic league appearances and goals as of 20 September 2026 (UTC) ‡ National team caps and goals as of 2 October 2026 (UTC)

Jhon Janer Lucumí Bonilla (born 26 June 1998) is a Colombian professional footballer who plays as a centre-back for Serie A club Juventus and the Colombia national team.

A youth product of hometown club Deportivo Cali, Lucumí made his professional football debut with the first team in 2015. After three years with the club, he transferred to Belgian Pro League side Genk, where he achieved a league title along with the Belgian Super Cup in his first season. In 2021, Lucumí won the Belgian Cup before moving to Serie A to play for Bologna the following year. He was a fundamental part of the squad that won the Coppa Italia in 2025.

At youth level, Lucumí was part of the Colombia U-17 squad that won gold at the 2014 South American Games. Additionally, he represented his country at the 2015 South American U-17 Championship. In 2018, he received his first call-up to Colombia's senior team; however, his debut wouldn't come until a year later in a friendly against Panama. Lucumí participated in three editions of the Copa América, (2019, 2021, and 2024), earning a bronze medal in 2021 and finishing as runner-up in 2024. He also took part at the 2026 FIFA World Cup.

== Club career ==
=== Deportivo Cali ===
Deportivo Cali Jhon Lucumí joined the youth academy of his hometown club, Deportivo Cali, in 2007. After progressing through their ranks, he made his senior team debut for the club in 2015, featuring in the Liga Dimayor Finalización. He officially made his professional debut in the top flight on 17 February 2016, starting in a Liga Águila Apertura match against Fortaleza CEIF.

During his time at Deportivo Cali, Lucumí steadily established himself as a promising young defender. While he was part of the club's setup when they won the Liga Águila I-2015, his significant first-team involvement began in subsequent seasons. He made 8 appearances in the Liga Dimayor Finalización in 2015, 5 appearances in 2016, and 12 in 2017 in the Colombian domestic league.

In the 2018 season, his final year with the club, Lucumí made 20 appearances across all competitions. This included 18 matches in the Liga Águila Apertura and two appearances in the Copa Sudamericana against Danubio FC, where Deportivo Cali advanced in the tie. He also featured in one Copa Libertadores match in 2016.

Lucumí's consistent performances attracted interest from European clubs. On 18 July 2018, he departed Deportivo Cali to join Belgian club Genk.

=== Genk ===
On 17 July 2018, Lucumí completed a transfer to Belgian Pro League side Genk. In his debut 2018–19 season, Lucumí quickly established himself as a key defensive figure. He made 10 appearances in the Belgian Pro League, 8 in the UEFA Europa League, 2 in the Croky Cup, and 5 in the UEFA Europa League Qualifiers, contributing to Genk's triumph in winning the Belgian First Division A title. He also played in 7 Belgian Pro League Play-offs matches, bringing his total appearances for the season to 39. His strong performances also saw Genk lift the Belgian Super Cup in his first season, defeating Mechelen 3–0 on 20 July 2019.

The 2019–20 season saw Lucumí continue to feature prominently for Genk. He played 22 matches in the Belgian Pro League. He also gained valuable experience in the UEFA Champions League, making 6 appearances, where he scored his first goal for the club against RB Salzburg in a 6–2 away defeat on 17 September 2019. In addition, he made one appearance in the Croky Cup. He ended the season with 29 appearances and 1 goal.

During the 2020–21 campaign, Lucumí made 32 appearances in the Belgian Pro League, 3 in the Croky Cup, and 6 in the Belgian Pro League Play-offs, contributing to Genk's success in winning the Belgian Cup by defeating Standard Liège 2–1 in the final on 25 April 2021. He made a total of 41 appearances that season.

In his final full season, 2021–22, Lucumí played 24 times in the Belgian Pro League, scoring his second goal for the club against Zulte Waregem in a 2–6 away defeat on 31 October 2021. He also featured in 5 UEFA Europa League matches, 2 UEFA Champions League Qualifying matches, 1 Croky Cup match, and 5 Belgian Pro League Play-offs matches, accumulating 37 appearances and 1 goal for the season.

Lucumí began the 2022–23 season with Genk, making 3 appearances in the Belgian Pro League before his departure. His successful four-year stint at Genk concluded on 17 August 2022, when he transferred to Serie A club Bologna.

=== Bologna ===
On 18 August 2022, he moved to Italian club Bologna. He made his debut on 27 August, playing a full 90 minutes in a 2–0 home defeat to A.C. Milan. Lucumí made his first direct goal contribution for the club on 12 November 2022, in a league match against Sassuolo, centering a cross to Michel Aebischer who scored Bologna's first goal in a 3–0 home win. He concluded his first season (2022–23) having made 33 appearances in Serie A and one appearance in the Coppa Italia.

During the 2023–24 season, Lucumí continued as a regular defender for Bologna, making 29 appearances in Serie A and featuring in two Coppa Italia matches. He played a significant role in Bologna's historic campaign, which saw the club qualify for the UEFA Champions League for the first time in 60 years, having last participated in the 1964–65 European Cup.

Lucumí scored Bologna's first goal of their 2024–25 UEFA Champions League campaign during a 2–1 home defeat against Lille in the league phase on 27 November 2024. He was also part of the Bologna squad that won the club's first Coppa Italia since 1974, securing the trophy during the 2024–25 season with a 1–0 victory against A.C. Milan.

=== Juventus ===
On 17 August 2026, Lucumí joined Juventus on a four-year contract.

== International career ==
Lucumí has represented Colombia at various youth levels, including the U-17 squad. He was part of the team that won the gold medal at the 2014 South American Games, beating Argentina 2–1 in the final. He made his Colombia national team debut on 3 June 2019, in a friendly against Panama, as a starter under then-manager Carlos Queiroz. Later that month, he was included in Colombia's squad for the 2019 Copa América in Brazil, making one appearance in the group stage against Paraguay.

Lucumí was also named in the Colombia squad for the 2021 Copa América in Brazil. Although he was part of the squad that secured a bronze medal, he did not make any appearances in the tournament. Lucumí became a more regular fixture in the national team during the 2026 FIFA World Cup qualifiers. He has made 12 appearances in the qualification campaign as of May 2025.

On 14 June 2024, Lucumí was named into the 26-man squad for the 2024 Copa América held in the United States. He was a starter in the first match of the competition against Paraguay but left injured at the 25th minute due to a thigh injury. Although he returned on 10 July from his injury, he was subsequently substituted by Carlos Cuesta for the remainder of the matches in the tournament. Colombia ultimately finished as runners-up in the tournament.

On 25 May 2026, he was named in head coach Néstor Lorenzo's final 26-man squad for the 2026 FIFA World Cup. He made his FIFA World Cup debut as a starter on 17 June in a 3–1 victory over Uzbekistan, marking his first appearance at the tournament.

== Career statistics ==
=== Club ===
As of match played 20 September 2026

Appearances and goals by club, season and competition
| Club | Season | League | | | National cup | | Continental | | Other | | Total | |
| Club | Season | Division | Apps | Goals | Apps | Goals | Apps | Goals | Apps | Goals | Apps | Goals |
|---|---|---|---|---|---|---|---|---|---|---|---|---|
| Deportivo Cali | 2015 | Liga DIMAYOR | 9 | 0 | — | | — | | — | | 9 | 0 |
| Deportivo Cali | 2016 | Liga DIMAYOR | 4 | 0 | — | | 1 (Note: Appearance in Copa Libertadores) | 0 | 1 (Note: Appearance in Superliga Colombiana) | 0 | 6 | 0 |
| Deportivo Cali | 2017 | Liga DIMAYOR | 11 | 0 | 7 | 0 | 1 (Note: Appearance(s) in Copa Sudamericana) | 0 | — | | 19 | 0 |
| Deportivo Cali | 2018 | Liga DIMAYOR | 18 | 0 | 0 | 0 | 2 | 0 | — | | 20 | 0 |
| Deportivo Cali | Total | | 42 | 0 | 7 | 0 | 4 | 0 | 1 | 0 | 54 | 0 |
| Genk | 2018–19 | Belgian Pro League | 10 | 0 | 0 | 0 | 8 (Note: Appearances in UEFA Europa League) | 0 | 7 (Note: Appearances in Belgian Pro League play-offs) | 0 | 25 | 0 |
| Genk | 2019–20 | Belgian Pro League | 22 | 1 | 0 | 0 | 6 (Note: Appearances in UEFA Champions League) | 0 | 0 | 0 | 28 | 1 |
| Genk | 2020–21 | Belgian Pro League | 32 | 0 | 0 | 0 | 0 | 0 | 6 | 0 | 44 | 0 |
| Genk | 2021–22 | Belgian Pro League | 24 | 1 | 0 | 0 | 7 (Note: Five appearances in UEFA Europa League, two appearances in UEFA Champions League) | 0 | 5 | 0 | 36 | 1 |
| Genk | 2022–23 | Belgian Pro League | 3 | 0 | — | | — | | — | | 3 | 0 |
| Genk | Total | | 91 | 2 | 0 | 0 | 21 | 0 | 18 | 0 | 130 | 2 |
| Bologna | 2022–23 | Serie A | 33 | 0 | 1 | 0 | — | | — | | 34 | 0 |
| Bologna | 2023–24 | Serie A | 29 | 0 | 2 | 0 | — | | — | | 31 | 0 |
| Bologna | 2024–25 | Serie A | 32 | 0 | 5 | 0 | 7 | 1 | — | | 44 | 1 |
| Bologna | 2025–26 | Serie A | 29 | 1 | 2 | 0 | 10 | 0 | 2 (Note: Appearances in Supercoppa Italiana) | 0 | 43 | 1 |
| Bologna | Total | | 123 | 1 | 10 | 0 | 17 | 1 | 2 | 0 | 152 | 2 |
| Juventus | 2026–27 | Serie A | 4 | 0 | 0 | 0 | 1 | 0 | — | | 5 | 0 |
| Career total | | | 260 | 3 | 17 | 0 | 43 | 1 | 21 | 0 | 341 | 4 |

=== International ===
As of match played 2 October 2026

Appearances and goals by national team and year
| National team | Year | Apps | Goals |
|---|---|---|---|
| Colombia | 2019 | 4 | 0 |
| Colombia | 2020 | 0 | 0 |
| Colombia | 2021 | 0 | 0 |
| Colombia | 2022 | 4 | 0 |
| Colombia | 2023 | 8 | 0 |
| Colombia | 2024 | 10 | 0 |
| Colombia | 2025 | 8 | 1 |
| Colombia | 2026 | 10 | 0 |
| Total | | 44 | 1 |

Scores and results list Colombia's goal tally first, score column indicates score after each Lucumí goal.

List of international goals scored by Jhon Lucumí
| No. | Date | Venue | Cap | Opponent | Score | Result | Competition |
|---|---|---|---|---|---|---|---|
| 1 | 11 October 2025 | AT&T Stadium, Arlington, United States | 31 | Mexico | 1–0 | 4–0 | Friendly |

== Honours ==
Genk

- Belgian First Division A: 2018–19
- Belgian Cup: 2020–21

Bologna

- Coppa Italia: 2024–25
