= Ragnar Berge =

Norwegian footballer (1925-1995)

Personal information
- Date of birth: 15 January 1925
- Date of death: 3 February 1995 (aged 70)
- Position: Defender

Senior career*
Years	Team	Apps	(Gls)
1945–1957	Vålerenga		

International career
1955	Norway	1	(0)
- * Club domestic league appearances and goals

Ragnar Berge (15 January 1925 – 3 February 1995) was a Norwegian footballer who played for Vålerenga. His grandson, Sander Berge is a professional footballer who currently plays for Fulham.
