= Manuel Benson =

Angolan footballer (born 1997)

Personal information
- Full name: Manuel Benson Hedilazio
- Date of birth: 28 March 1997 (age 29)
- Place of birth: Lokeren, Belgium
- Height: 1.69 m (5 ft 7 in)
- Position: Winger

Youth career
- 2003–2007: Lokeren
- 2007–2010: Anderlecht
- 2010–2014: Lierse

Senior career*
Years	Team	Apps	(Gls)
2014–2017	Lierse	68	(9)
2017–2019	Genk	11	(0)
2018–2019	→ Royal Excel Mouscron (loan)	26	(4)
2019–2022	Royal Antwerp	51	(5)
2021	→ PEC Zwolle (loan)	13	(0)
2022–2026	Burnley	44	(12)
2025–2026	→ Swansea City (loan)	6	(0)
2026	Maccabi Haifa	10	(1)

International career^{‡}
2014	Belgium U19	2	(0)
2017–2019	Belgium U21	2	(0)
2024–	Angola	9	(0)
- * Club domestic league appearances and goals as of 23 June 2026 ‡ National team caps and goals as of 19:58, 29 April 2026 (UTC)

Manuel Benson Hedilazio (born 28 March 1997) is a professional footballer who plays as a winger. Born in Belgium, he plays for the Angola national team.

== Early life ==
Benson was born in Lokeren to an Angolan father, Jorge Hedilazio, and a Belgian mother, Gina Pieters. His parents met in the 1990s at Bobby's Club, a dance bar in Lokeren, while his father was playing for the local club.

== Club career ==
Benson made his top flight debut, playing for Lierse, on 19 April 2014 against KV Oostende in a 2–0 home defeat. He replaced Ahmed Sayed after 87 minutes. In the 2016–17 season he played 37 league games for Lierse, scoring 7 goals, four of which in 9 Europa League play-offs games. In this season Benson also tied with Kevin Kis for the league's top assist provider.

In 2017, he moved to RC Genk, and was loaned out to Royal Excel Mouscron for the 2018–19 season. He played a total of 28 games for Mouscron, scoring 6 goals. Benson had the most assists in the regular season behind Hans Vanaken and Alejandro Pozuelo with 8.

In September 2019, he moved to Royal Antwerp FC on a permanent move.

In the 2020–21 season, Benson played five games in the Belgian First Division A and 3 games in the UEFA Europa League, scoring one goal in Antwerp's 3–1 win over Ludogorets, which allowed them to advance to the Round of 32. On 26 January 2021, Benson moved to Eredivisie club PEC Zwolle on a loan deal until the end of the season. He had the most assists of his team in the 2020–21 Eredivisie, recording four assists in 13 league games.

On 4 August 2022, Benson joined EFL Championship club Burnley for an undisclosed fee on a four-year deal. He scored his first goal for Burnley in a 2–1 win against Bristol City on 17 September 2022. He scored his first FA Cup goals on 7 January 2023, notching a pair in an away game against Bournemouth.

== International career ==
Benson made his debut for the Angola national team on 7 June 2024 in a World Cup qualifier against Eswatini at the Estádio 11 de Novembro. He substituted Felício Milson in the 69th minute of Angola's 1–0 victory.

On 3 December 2025, Benson was called up to the Angola squad for the 2025 Africa Cup of Nations.

== Career statistics ==
=== Club ===
As of match played 23 June 2026

Appearances and goals by club, season and competition
Club	Season	League			National cup (Note: Includes Belgian Cup, FA Cup, Israel State Cup)		League cup (Note: Includes EFL Cup)		Europe		Other		Total	
Club	Season	Division	Apps	Goals	Apps	Goals	Apps	Goals	Apps	Goals	Apps	Goals	Apps	Goals
Lierse	2013–14	Belgian Pro League	1	0	0	0	—		—		—		1	0
Lierse	2014–15	Belgian Pro League	9	0	0	0	—		—		2 (Note: Appearances in Belgian Pro League relegation play-offs)	0	11	0
Lierse	2015–16	Belgian Second Division	21	2	0	0	—		—		—		21	2
Lierse	2016–17	Belgian First Division B	37	7	1	1	—		—		—		38	8
Lierse	Total		68	9	1	1	—		—		2	0	71	10
Genk	2017–18	Belgian First Division A	8	0	3	0	—		—		—		11	0
Genk	2018–19	Belgian First Division A	0	0	—		—		1 (Note: Appearance(s) in UEFA Europa League)	0	—		1	0
Genk	2019–20	Belgian First Division A	3	0	—		—		0	0	1 (Note: Appearance in Belgian Super Cup)	0	4	0
Genk	Total		11	0	3	0	—		1	0	1	0	16	0
Mouscron (loan)	2018–19	Belgian First Division A	26	4	2	2	—		—		—		28	6
Antwerp	2019–20	Belgian First Division A	11	0	5	1	—		0	0	—		16	1
Antwerp	2020–21	Belgian First Division A	5	0	0	0	—		3	1	—		8	1
Antwerp	2021–22	Belgian First Division A	34	5	1	0	—		7	1	—		42	6
Antwerp	2022–23	Belgian Pro League	1	0	—		—		2 (Note: Appearances in UEFA Europa Conference League)	0	—		3	0
Antwerp	Total		51	5	6	1	—		12	2	—		69	8
PEC Zwolle (loan)	2020–21	Eredivisie	13	0	—		—		—		—		13	0
Burnley	2022–23	Championship	33	11	1	2	3	0	—		—		37	13
Burnley	2023–24	Premier League	8	0	0	0	1	0	—		—		9	0
Burnley	2024–25	Championship	3	1	2	0	0	0	—		—		5	1
Burnley	2025–26	Premier League	0	0	0	0	0	0	—		—		0	0
Burnley	Total		44	12	3	2	4	0	—		—		51	14
Swansea City (loan)	2025–26	Championship	6	0	0	0	2	0	—		—		8	0
Maccabi Haifa (loan)	2025–26	Israeli Premier League	10	1	0	0	2	0	—		—		12	1
Career total			229	31	15	6	8	0	13	2	3	0	268	39

=== International ===
As of match played 29 December 2025

Appearances and goals by national team and year
National team	Year	Apps	Goals
Angola
Angola	2024	2	0
Angola	2025	7	0
Total		9	0

== Honours ==
Genk

- Belgian Super Cup: 2019

Antwerp

- Belgian Cup: 2019–20

Burnley

- EFL Championship: 2022–23

Individual

- Belgian Second Division top assist provider: 2016–17 (joint – 7 assists)
