= Joseph Paintsil =

Ghanaian footballer (born 1998)

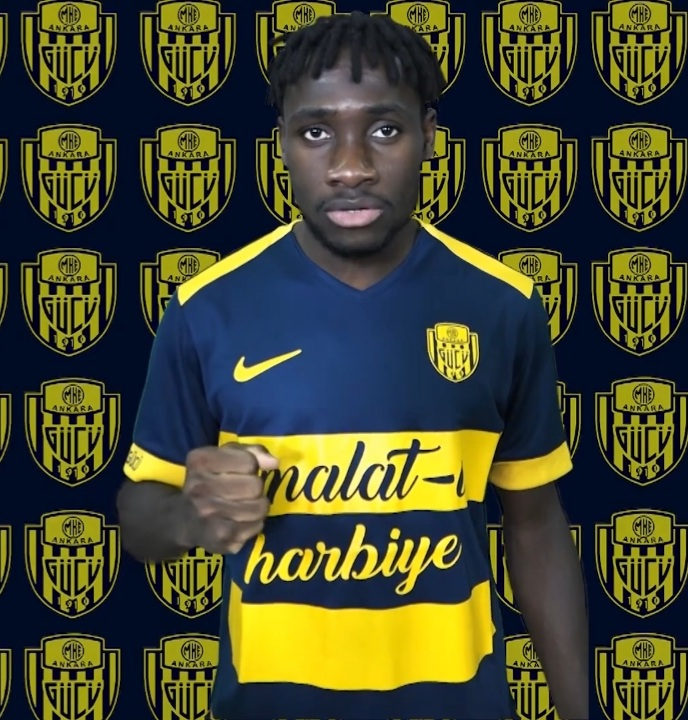
- Paintsil in his 2020 video presentation

Personal information
- Full name: Joseph Paintsil
- Date of birth: 1 February 1998 (age 28)
- Place of birth: Accra, Ghana
- Height: 1.70 m (5 ft 7 in)
- Position: Winger

Team information
- Current team: LA Galaxy
- Number: 28

Youth career
- –2014: Red Bull Ghana
- 2015–2017: Tema Youth

Senior career*
| Years | Team | Apps | (Gls) |
| 2016–2017 | Tema Youth | 22 | (10) |
| 2017–2018 | → Ferencváros (loan) | 25 | (10) |
| 2018–2024 | Genk | 130 | (30) |
| 2020–2021 | → Ankaragücü (loan) | 33 | (11) |
| 2024– | LA Galaxy | 74 | (25) |

International career^{‡}
| 2017– | Ghana | 15 | (0) |
- * Club domestic league appearances and goals as of 11:47, 10 September 2026 (UTC) ‡ National team caps and goals as of 23:52, 21 February 2024 (UTC)

Joseph Paintsil (born 1 February 1998) is a Ghanaian professional footballer who plays as a winger for Major League Soccer club LA Galaxy and the Ghana national team.

== Club career ==
=== Tema Youth ===
Paintsil made his Ghana Premier League debut with Tema Youth 12 February 2017 after the club were promoted from Division One the previous season. He scored 10 goals in 22 games during his only season, before leaving Ghana for Europe during the season's month-long break in August. Paintsil was fifth in the Golden Boot race at the time of his departure, and finished the season joint-eighth, top scorer for Tema.

=== Ferencvárosi (loan) ===
On 31 August, Paintsil signed with top Hungarian club Ferencváros, playing in the country's top-flight, the NBI. Initially signed on loan, Paintsil had an option with the club to be signed permanently at the end of the season. Paintsil made his debut on 9 September against Vasas, scoring the first goal in a 5–2 win, taking the place of Rui Pedro in the lineup. He scored four goals in his first five games, and was a mainstay in the lineup of manager Thomas Doll. On 2 December, Paintsil scored a goal on the counter-attack against Videoton that showcased his pace and ball control, and would later be voted as the Goal of the Year for 2017 by Hungarian football fans. At the halfway point of the season, Paintsil had six goals and four assists, and was rated by Nemzeti Sport as the league's top player. Paintsil split his time starting on the left and in the middle, as a #10. He finished the season with 10 goals in 25 games, good for third on the team and ninth in the league. Ferencváros finished the league in second, and after rumours of a winter transfer that was not allowed to go through by the club, Paintsil left the club after the season.

=== Genk ===
On 3 July 2018, Paintsil was unveiled as a player of Belgian club Genk, a few weeks after a contract had been agreed with the club. Paintsil began the season with an injury, missing three league games and four Europa League qualifiers. His debut came on 19 August in the First Division A against R. Charleroi S.C., and his full debut came the following week against Waasland-Beveren. His first goals came when he scored a brace against Gent on 7 October. His continental debut came when Paintsil was used off the bench in both legs of the play-off round against Danish side Brøndby. He came off the bench at half-time against Sarpsborg on 4 October, replacing Dieumerci Ndongala. After that, he started the remaining four group stage games, scoring in the last two, as Genk won their group. Genk drew Slavia Prague in the knockout stage, and Paintsil did not start either leg as Genk were eliminated 4–1 on aggregate. Paintsil also started all three games of Genk's campaign in the Belgian Cup, which ended in the quarterfinals with a penalty shootout defeat in which Paintsil scored to Union SG. His form in the league was not as strong, and the goals against Gent were his only goals during the regular season. Paintsil scored in the first match of the play-offs, a 3–0 win over Anderlecht on 30 March 2019. His first start in three months came on the final day of the season, after Genk had already clinched their first title in eight seasons. In the league, Paintsil made 25 appearances, scoring three times.

Paintsil was on the bench for the club's win in the Belgian Super Cup, but did not enter the game. Following the sale of Leandro Trossard to England in the off-season, Paintsil was given an opportunity to claim the left wing position, and scored his first goal on 17 August against Waasland-Beveren. He had a run of six games in the team to start the season until leaving the game on 13 September against Charleroi in the first half with an injury. Paintsil returned after nearly two months out with injury, starting against Mouscron on 23 November. His Champions League debut came on 2 October against Italian side Napoli, receiving the final minutes off the bench. He played twice more in the group stage, including starting the final game against Napoli, as the club were already eliminated from further continental play, impressing in the 4–0 defeat. Paintsil would only make two starts the rest of the season, which was suspended in March due to the COVID-19 pandemic in Belgium, his spot mostly taken by Théo Bongonda.

On 10 September 2020, he transferred to Süper Lig club MKE Ankaragücü on loan. He made his debut with a late substitute in a 2–1 home lose against Erzurumspor FK on 13 September 2020. He played one season with the club and scored 11 goals in 33 matches.

Returning to Genk, he helped inspire a major title challenge in 2022–23 season that saw Genk denied the title in the 94th minute of their final game against Royal Antwerp, with Toby Alderweireld scoring a last-gasp equaliser to wrest the title away to Antwerp. During that campaign, the Ghanaian scored 17 goals and 12 assists in his 36 league games, the second-most goal contributions across the whole Pro League that season.

=== LA Galaxy ===
On 21 February 2024, Paintsil signed a four-year deal with Major League Soccer side LA Galaxy for a reported $9 million transfer fee.

== Personal life ==
Born and raised in Fadama, a suburb of Accra, Paintsil models his game after his idol, Andrés Iniesta. His older brother Seth is also a footballer.

== Career statistics ==
As of match played 7 December 2024

Appearances and goals by club, season and competition
| Club | Season | League | | | National cup (Note: Includes Ghanaian FA Cup, Belgian Cup) | | Continental | | Other | | Total | |
| Club | Season | Division | Apps | Goals | Apps | Goals | Apps | Goals | Apps | Goals | Apps | Goals |
|---|---|---|---|---|---|---|---|---|---|---|---|---|
| Tema Youth | 2017 | Ghana Premier League | 22 | 10 | 2 | 0 | – | | – | | 24 | 10 |
| Ferencváros (loan) | 2017–18 | Nemzeti Bajnokság I | 25 | 10 | 0 | 0 | 0 | 0 | – | | 25 | 10 |
| Genk | 2018–19 | Belgian Pro League | 25 | 3 | 3 | 0 | 9 (Note: Appearances in UEFA Europa League) | 2 | – | | 37 | 5 |
| Genk | 2019–20 | Belgian Pro League | 18 | 1 | 2 | 0 | 3 (Note: Appearances in UEFA Champions League) | 0 | 0 | 0 | 23 | 1 |
| Genk | 2021–22 | Belgian Pro League | 28 | 3 | 2 | 3 | 5 (Note: One appearance in UEFA Champions League, four appearances and one goal in UEFA Europa League) | 1 | 1 (Note: Appearance in Belgian Super Cup) | 0 | 36 | 7 |
| Genk | 2022–23 | Belgian Pro League | 36 | 17 | 3 | 1 | – | | – | | 39 | 18 |
| Genk | 2023–24 | Belgian Pro League | 23 | 6 | 1 | 0 | 9 (Note: Two appearances in UEFA Champions League, two appearances and one goal in UEFA Europa League, five appearances and two goals in UEFA Europa Conference League) | 3 | – | | 33 | 9 |
| Genk | Total | | 130 | 30 | 11 | 4 | 26 | 6 | 1 | 0 | 167 | 40 |
| MKE Ankaragücü (loan) | 2020–21 | Süper Lig | 33 | 11 | 0 | 0 | – | | – | | 33 | 11 |
| LA Galaxy | 2024 | MLS | 29 | 10 | 0 | 0 | – | | 8 (Note: Three appearances and one goal in Leagues Cup, five appearances and four goals in MLS Cup Playoffs) | 5 | 37 | 15 |
| Career total | | | 215 | 63 | 13 | 4 | 26 | 6 | 9 | 5 | 270 | 78 |

== Honours ==
Genk

- Belgian First Division A: 2018–19
- Belgian Super Cup: 2019

LA Galaxy

- MLS Cup: 2024
- Western Conference (MLS): 2024
