= Sander Berge =

Norwegian footballer (born 1998)

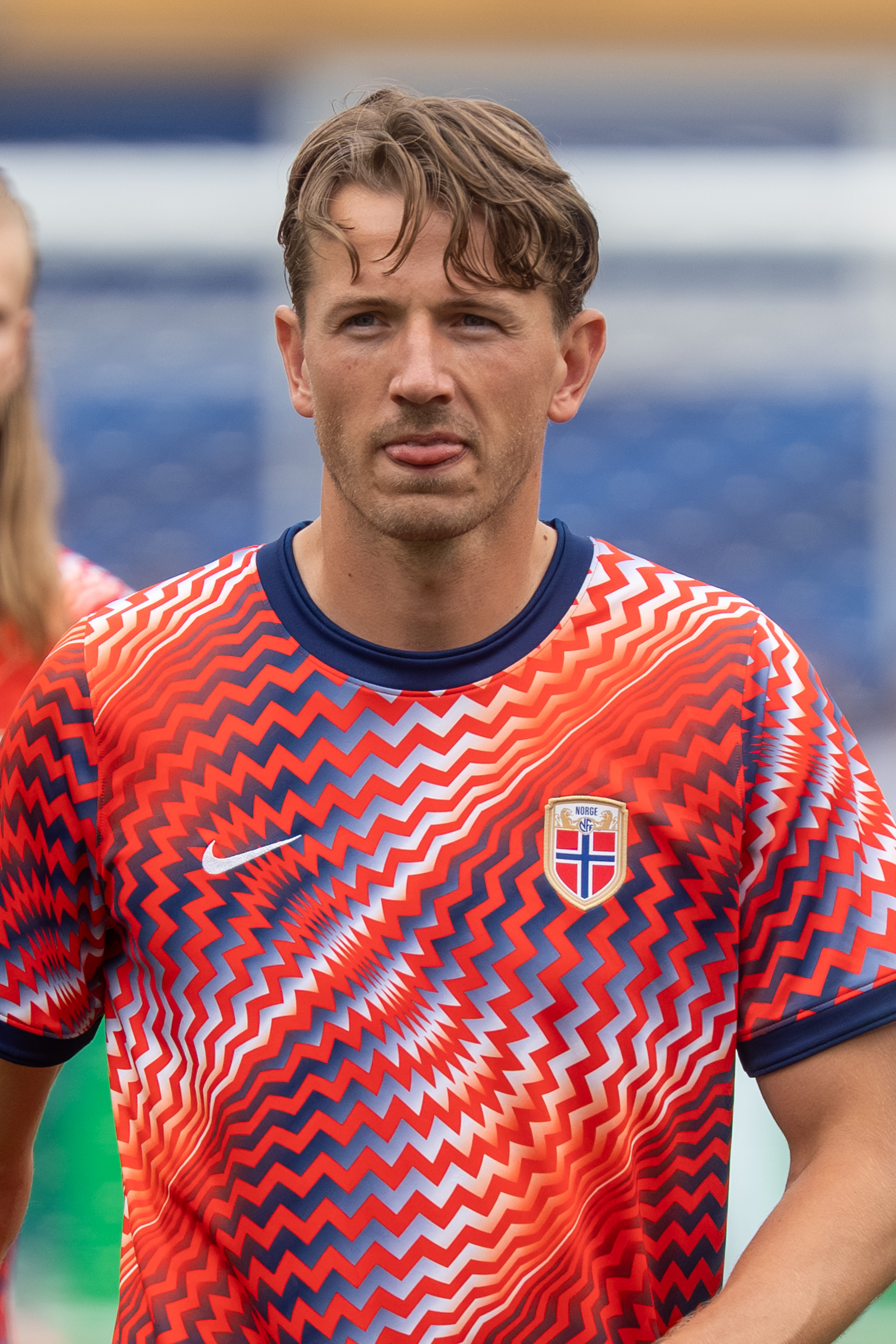
- Berge with Norway in 2026

Personal information
- Full name: Sander Gard Bolin Berge
- Date of birth: 14 February 1998 (age 28)
- Place of birth: Bærum, Norway
- Height: 1.95 m (6 ft 5 in)
- Position: Defensive midfielder

Team information
- Current team: Fulham
- Number: 16

Youth career
- Asker

Senior career*
Years	Team	Apps	(Gls)
2013–2014	Asker	8	(0)
2015–2017	Vålerenga	36	(0)
2017–2020	Genk	84	(4)
2020–2023	Sheffield United	97	(13)
2023–2024	Burnley	37	(1)
2024–	Fulham	75	(0)

International career^{‡}
2013	Norway U15	4	(1)
2014	Norway U16	8	(4)
2015	Norway U17	4	(0)
2015–2016	Norway U18	6	(0)
2016	Norway U19	1	(0)
2016	Norway U21	2	(0)
2017–	Norway	77	(1)
- * Club domestic league appearances and goals as of 22:01, 31 October 2026 (UTC) ‡ National team caps and goals as of 17 November 2026

Sander Gard Bolin Berge (born 14 February 1998) is a Norwegian professional footballer who plays as a defensive midfielder for Premier League club Fulham and the Norway national team.

== Club career ==
=== Early career ===
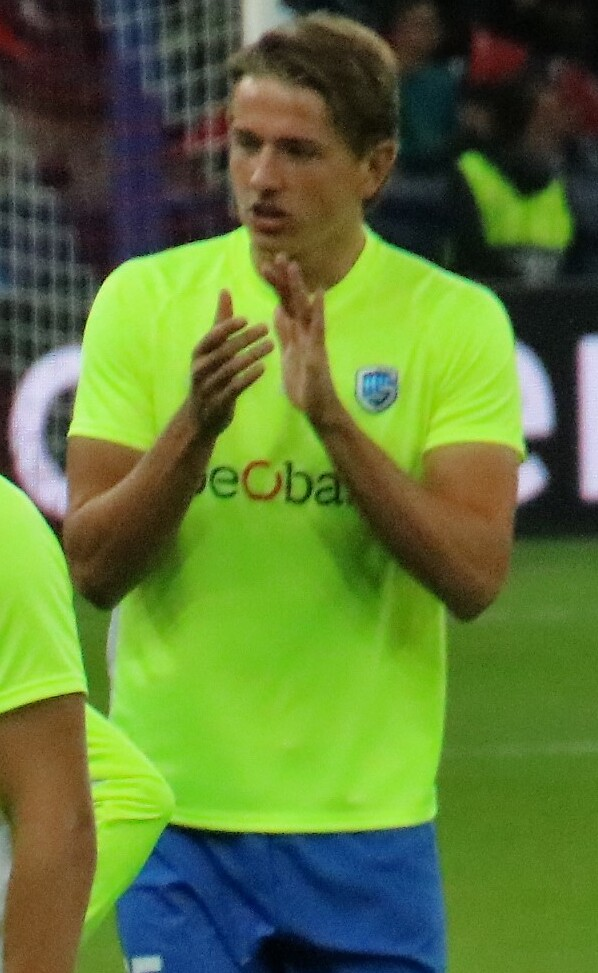
Berge training with Genk in 2019.

Berge was born in Bærum, Akershus. He started his career playing youth football for Asker, making his senior debut in the end of the 2013 season for the team then playing in the Norwegian 2. divisjon. He joined top flight team Vålerenga before the 2015 season and made his debut at the age of 17, scoring the opening goal of an 8–0 win over Lokomotiv Oslo in the first round of the Norwegian Cup.

Berge made his league debut for Vålerenga as a substitute against Sandefjord on 11 July 2015 and his first league start against Rosenborg on 16 August. He became established as a regular starter in the 2016 season and was named as the Norwegian league's young player of the year.

On 2 January 2017, he signed a four-year contract with Genk. He made his first team league debut on 21 January as a substitute in the 1–0 win away against Eupen. He earned his first start and full match against Mouscron on 17 February in a 1–0 win at home, becoming an integral part of the team for the remaining season, which included an impressive run in the Europa League, ending in the quarter finals against Celta Vigo.

During the 2018–19 season, Berge made 28 appearances as Genk won the Belgian championship.

Berge made his UEFA Champions League debut in a 6–2 loss to RB Salzburg on 17 September 2019. On 30 December, he was named by UEFA in the Champions League breakthrough team for 2019.

=== Sheffield United ===
On 30 January 2020, Berge signed for Premier League club Sheffield United, becoming the club's record signing. He joined on a four-and-a-half-year contract. On 2 July 2020, Berge scored his first goal for Sheffield United in a 3–1 win against Tottenham Hotspur.

On 17 December 2020, Berge suffered an injury in a 3–2 loss to Manchester United which led to him missing the majority of the 2020–21 Premier League season as Sheffield United were relegated to the EFL Championship.

During the 2022–23 season, Berge contributed six goals as Sheffield United were promoted back to the Premier League.

=== Burnley ===
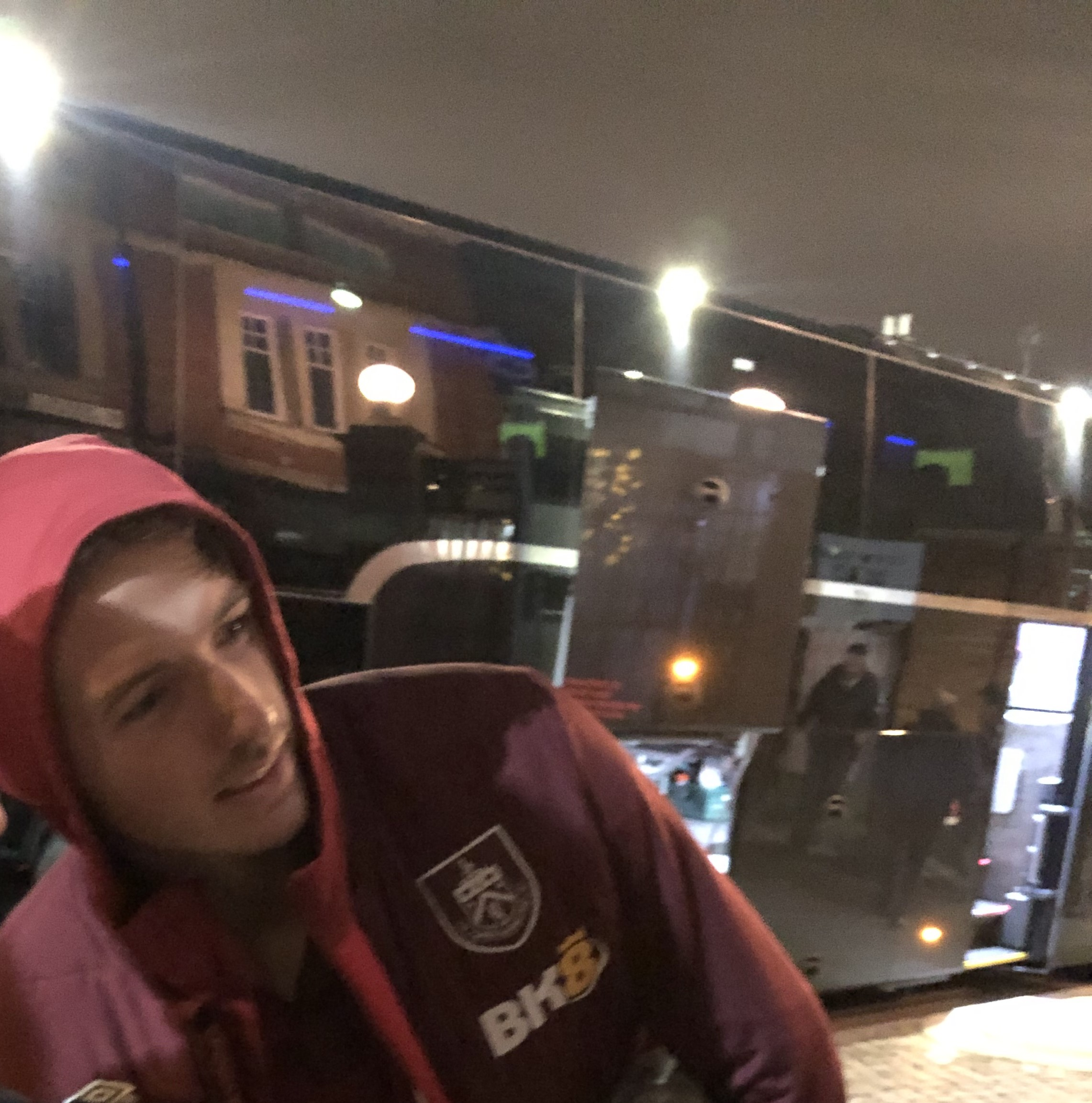
Berge pictured with a fan during his time at Burnley in 2023.

On 9 August 2023, Berge signed for Premier League club Burnley. Two days later, he made his debut for the team in their 3–0 loss to Manchester City in the opening game of the 2023–24 season. His first goal for the club came in a 4–0 EFL Cup win over Salford City on 26 September 2023.

Berge scored his first Premier League goal for Burnley in a 2–0 win at Fulham on 23 December 2023.

=== Fulham ===
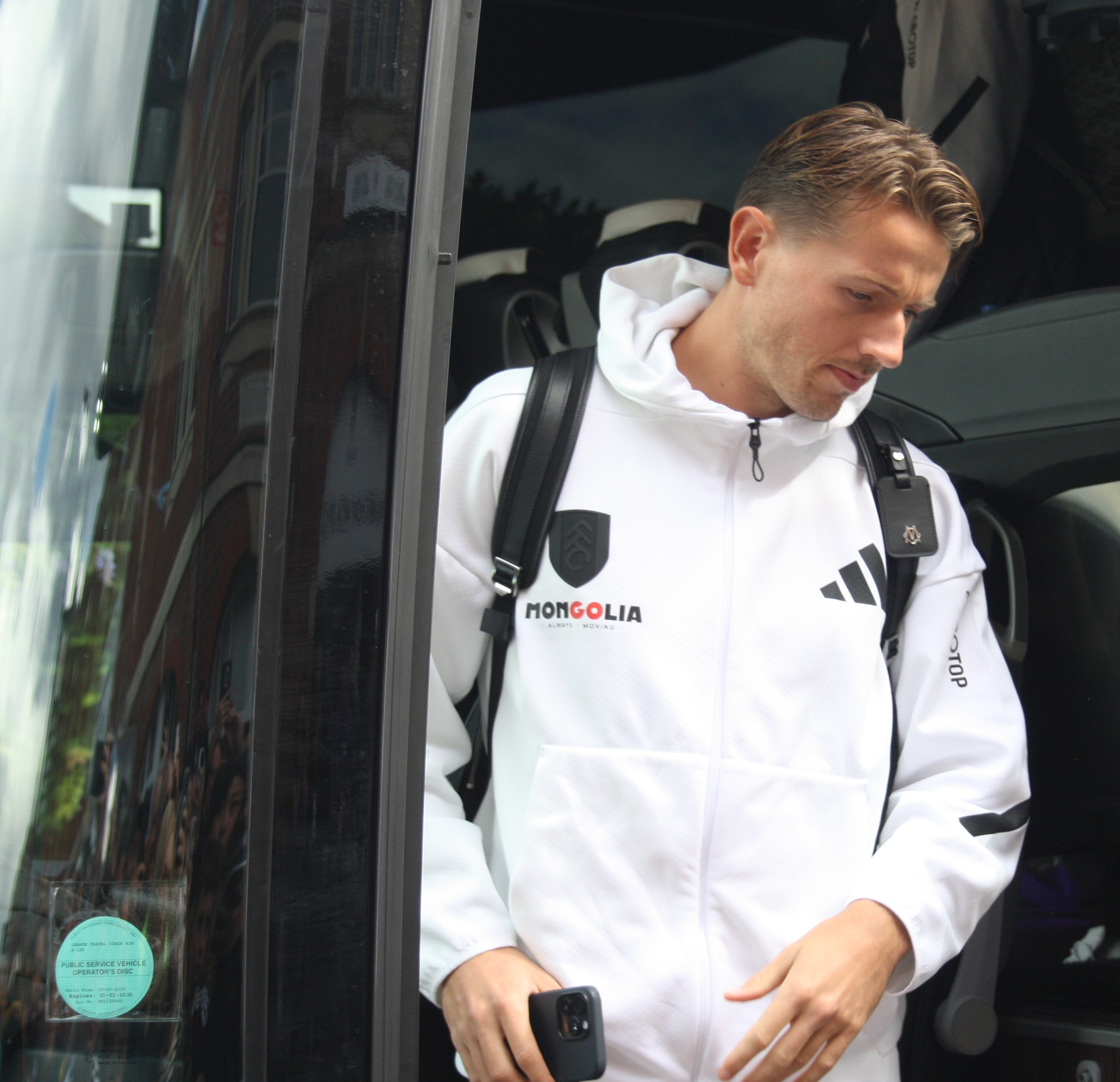
Berge with Fulham in 2025.

On 22 August 2024, Berge signed for Premier League side Fulham on a five-year deal for £20 million plus £5 million in add-ons. The club has the option to extend his contract by 12 months within the deal.

== International career ==
Berge made his debut for Norway when he played for the under-15 team against Canada U15 on 2 May 2013. He has since represented Norway at every level up to the senior national team. He made his senior international debut on 23 March 2017, aged 19, coming on as a substitute in the 76th minute of the Euro-qualifier against Northern Ireland.

On 5 September 2019, Berge scored his first senior international goal in the 34th minute of a game against Malta in the UEFA Euro 2020 qualifying rounds.

On 21 May 2026, Berge was included in the 26-man squad selected by Norway national team manager Ståle Solbakken for the 2026 FIFA World Cup.

== Personal life ==
Berge comes from a basketball-playing family, with his father, Swedish mother and older brother all having played basketball at international level. His brother has also played for top flight teams Centrum Tigers and Asker Aliens. Berge is also the grandson of Ragnar Berge, who played as a left-back for Vålerenga from 1945 until 1957, and was capped once by Norway (in 1955).

Berge and his partner Julie Karlsen's first child, a son, was born on 8 June 2025.

== Career statistics ==
=== Club ===
As of match played 31 October 2026

Appearances and goals by club, season and competition
Club	Season	League			National cup (Note: Includes Norwegian Cup, Belgian Cup, FA Cup)		League cup (Note: Includes EFL Cup)		Europe		Other		Total	
Club	Season	Division	Apps	Goals	Apps	Goals	Apps	Goals	Apps	Goals	Apps	Goals	Apps	Goals
Asker 2	2013	3. divisjon	10	0	—		—		—		—		10	0
Asker 2	2014	3. divisjon	5	0	—		—		—		—		5	0
Asker 2	Total		15	0	0	0	0	0	0	0	0	0	15	0
Asker	2013	2. divisjon	1	0	0	0	—		—		—		1	0
Asker	2014	2. divisjon	7	0	1	0	—		—		—		8	0
Asker	Total		8	0	1	0	0	0	0	0	0	0	9	0
Vålerenga 2	2015	2. divisjon	11	0	—		—		—		—		11	0
Vålerenga	2015	Tippeligaen	11	0	2	1	—		—		—		13	1
Vålerenga	2016	Tippeligaen	25	0	5	0	—		—		—		30	0
Vålerenga	Total		36	0	7	1	0	0	0	0	0	0	43	1
Genk	2016–17	Belgian Pro League	19	0	2	0	—		6 (Note: Appearances in UEFA Europa League)	0	—		27	0
Genk	2017–18	Belgian Pro League	14	0	1	0	—		—		—		15	0
Genk	2018–19	Belgian Pro League	28	0	2	0	—		10	2	—		40	2
Genk	2019–20	Belgian Pro League	23	4	1	0	—		6 (Note: Appearances in UEFA Champions League)	0	1 (Note: Appearance in Belgian Super Cup)	0	30	4
Genk	Total		84	4	6	0	0	0	22	2	1	0	113	6
Sheffield United	2019–20	Premier League	14	1	2	0	—		—		—		16	1
Sheffield United	2020–21	Premier League	15	1	0	0	1	0	—		—		16	1
Sheffield United	2021–22	Championship	31	5	1	0	0	0	—		2 (Note: Appearance in Championship play-offs)	1	34	6
Sheffield United	2022–23	Championship	37	6	5	1	1	0	—		—		43	7
Sheffield United	Total		97	13	8	1	2	0	0	0	2	1	109	15
Burnley	2023–24	Premier League	37	1	0	0	3	1	—		—		40	2
Fulham	2024–25	Premier League	31	0	3	0	2	0	—		—		36	0
Fulham	2025–26	Premier League	35	0	2	0	2	0	—		—		39	0
Fulham	2026–27	Premier League	9	0	0	0	1	0	—		—		10	0
Fulham	Total		75	0	5	0	5	0	—		—		85	0
Career total			363	18	26	2	10	1	22	2	3	1	425	24

=== International ===
As of match played 17 November 2026

Appearances and goals by national team and year
National team	Year	Apps	Goals
Norway	2017	7	0
Norway	2018	5	0
Norway	2019	8	1
Norway	2020	4	0
Norway	2021	0	0
Norway	2022	8	0
Norway	2023	10	0
Norway	2024	10	0
Norway	2025	10	0
Norway	2026	15	0
Total		77	1

As of match played 4 October 2026. Norway score listed first, score column indicates score after each Berge goal.

List of international goals scored by Sander Berge
No.	Date	Venue	Cap	Opponent	Score	Result	Competition	Ref.
1	5 September 2019	Ullevaal Stadion, Oslo, Norway	15	Malta	1–0	2–0	UEFA Euro 2020 qualification	

== Honours ==
Genk

- Belgian Pro League: 2018–19
- Belgian Super Cup: 2019
