= Dries Wouters =

Belgian footballer

Personal information
- Date of birth: 28 January 1997 (age 29)
- Place of birth: Tongeren, Belgium
- Height: 1.91 m (6 ft 3 in)
- Positions: Centre-back; defensive midfielder

Team information
- Current team: Lommel
- Number: 5

Youth career
- 2003–2006: KSK Jecora
- 2006–2014: Genk

Senior career*
Years	Team	Apps	(Gls)
2014–2021	Genk	52	(2)
2021–2023	Schalke 04	2	(0)
2022–2023	→ Mechelen (loan)	18	(1)
2023–	Lommel	87	(7)

International career
2012–2013	Belgium U16	12	(0)
2013–2014	Belgium U17	5	(0)
2014–2015	Belgium U18	6	(0)
2015–2016	Belgium U19	10	(0)
2018–2019	Belgium U21	4	(0)
- * Club domestic league appearances and goals as of 20 April 2026

Dries Wouters (born 28 January 1997) is a Belgian professional footballer who plays as a centre-back or defensive midfielder for Belgian club Lommel.

== Career ==
Wouters played with Genk as a junior. He made his Belgian Pro League debut with K.R.C. Genk on 10 May 2015 against SV Zulte Waregem.

He signed for Schalke 04, newly relegated to the 2. Bundesliga, in July 2021. On 12 January 2022, Wouters returned to Belgium to join Mechelen on loan until the end of the season. On 20 June 2022, the loan was extended.

On 27 June 2023, Wouters agreed to join Challenger Pro League club Lommel.

== Career statistics ==
As of 26 June 2023

Club	Season	League			Cup		Europe		Other		Total	
Club	Season	Division	Apps	Goals	Apps	Goals	Apps	Goals	Apps	Goals	Apps	Goals
Genk	2014–15	First Division A	1	0	0	0	—		—		1	0
Genk	2015–16	First Division A	1	0	2	0	—		—		3	0
Genk	2016–17	First Division A	7	0	0	0	3	0	1 (Note: Appearance in First Division A Europa League play-offs)	0	11	0
Genk	2017–18	First Division A	15	1	4	0	—		—		19	1
Genk	2018–19	First Division A	7	0	1	1	2	0	—		10	1
Genk	2019–20	First Division A	13	1	2	0	0	0	—		15	1
Genk	2020–21	First Division A	8	0	0	0	—		—		8	0
Genk	Total		52	2	9	1	5	0	1	0	67	3
Schalke 04	2021–22	2. Bundesliga	2	0	1	0	—		—		3	0
Mechelen (loan)	2021–22	First Division A	4	0	—		—		—		4	0
Mechelen (loan)	2022–23	First Division A	14	1	2	0	—		—		16	1
Mechelen (loan)	Total		18	1	2	0	—		—		20	1
Career total			72	2	12	1	5	0	1	0	90	4

== Honours ==
Genk

- Belgian First Division A: 2018–19
- Belgian Cup: 2020–21
- Belgian Super Cup: 2019
