= Bryan Heynen =

Belgian footballer

Personal information
- Date of birth: 6 February 1997 (age 29)
- Place of birth: Bree, Belgium
- Height: 1.83 m (6 ft 0 in)
- Position: Defensive midfielder

Team information
- Current team: Genk
- Number: 28

Youth career
- 2003–2015: Genk

Senior career*
Years	Team	Apps	(Gls)
2015–	Genk	317	(35)

International career^{‡}
2013	Belgium U16	3	(0)
2017–2019	Belgium U21	12	(0)
2025–	Belgium	1	(0)
- * Club domestic league appearances and goals as of 25 October 2026 ‡ National team caps and goals as of 23 March 2025

Bryan Heynen (born 6 February 1997) is a Belgian professional footballer who plays as a midfielder for Belgian Pro League club Genk and the Belgium national team.

== Career ==
Heynen came through the youth system at Genk to make his Belgian Pro League debut on 25 July 2015 in a 3–1 home win against OH Leuven. He replaced Wilfred Ndidi after 66 minutes.

In his second season at the club, Heynen had an elongated run in the first team under Peter Maes at the age of 19 as Genk finished eighth.

Due to a serious knee injury that he sustained in training in November 2017, he did not play much in the 2017–18 season, but was still offered a new five-year contract at the end of 2018.

With Philippe Clement now in charge, Heynen played all but five games as Genk stormed to the 2019 league title, the fourth in their history and their first for eight years.

Clement's departure for Club Brugge saw a period of instability and major change off the pitch as the club hired four first-team coaches in the space of 15 months - Felice Mazzu, Hannes Wolf, Jess Thorup and finally John van den Brom.

With Heynen now appointed captain by Mazzu, he featured in Genk's early UEFA Champions League exit in 2019–20 having been paired with Liverpool, Napoli and a Salzburg side containing Erling Haaland and Takumi Minamino.

When Thorup departed for FC Copenhagen in his native Denmark after six games, Genk finally found stability for the 2020–21 season under van den Brom, finishing runners-up behind Club Brugge in the League, and winning the 2020–21 Belgian Cup with Heynen as captain, beating Standard Liege 2–1 in the final.

After a disappointing campaign the following season where defensive frailty saw van den Brom dismissed mid-season, and Bernd Storck only able to guide Genk to the 2022 Belgian Pro League's European play-offs, Heynen's form surged under the tenureship of new coach Wouter Vrancken. Genk lost their opening league game of the season champions Club Brugge, before going on to win 15 of their next 16 league games - drawing the other one for an unbeaten run of 16 - to go ten points clear of second-placed Union St-Gilloise by Christmas 2022.

Genk remained in touch at the top and lying in third place heading into the final day, needed a home win over league leaders Royal Antwerp to clinch the club their first title since 2019, with Union dropping points to Club Brugge. Heynen headed Genk in front with 15 minutes to go, but with Union leading Club Brugge 1–0 in Brussels, were set to finish second. However, Club equalised in the 90th minute and went ahead in stoppage time at Duden Park. With Genk still leading going into stoppage time, Heynen's lead goal meant they were suddenly in pole position to win the league. However, Toby Alderweireld equalised in the 94th minute for Antwerp, denying Genk the crown.

Heynen was named by Belgium national team coach Roberto Martinez in the preliminary Belgian squad of 55 ahead of the 2022 FIFA World Cup, but didn't make the plane for Qatar. A continuation in strong form saw big calls for Heynen and team-mate Mike Trésor to be capped by new national team coach Domenico Tedesco for his first games in charge against Sweden and Germany in March 2023, but neither player was chosen.

Heynen battled through a muscle injury to score a late equaliser away to KVC Westerlo to squeeze Genk into the 2023-24 title play-offs, but the damage inflicted ruled him out for the rest of the season. Without him, Genk finished fifth and were beaten in the European play-off final by Gent.

Heynen made his 300th appearance in all competitions for Genk in a 4–0 win over Dender on 22 September 2024, a win that put the club top of the table.

== Career statistics ==
=== Club ===
As of match played 25 October 2026

Appearances and goals by club, season and competition
Club	Season	League			Belgian Cup		Europe		Total	
Club	Season	Division	Apps	Goals	Apps	Goals	Apps	Goals	Apps	Goals
Genk	2015–16	Belgian Pro League	10	0	2	0	—		12	0
Genk	2016–17	Belgian Pro League	33	0	4	0	13 (Note: Appearances in UEFA Europa League)	1	50	1
Genk	2017–18	Belgian Pro League	10	0	1	0	—		11	0
Genk	2018–19	Belgian Pro League	35	5	2	0	7	1	44	6
Genk	2019–20	Belgian Pro League	14	1	2	1	4 (Note: Appearances in UEFA Champions League)	0	20	2
Genk	2020–21	Belgian Pro League	29	2	4	0	0	0	33	2
Genk	2021–22	Belgian Pro League	38	5	2	0	7 (Note: Two appearances in UEFA Champions League, five appearances in UEFA Europa League)	0	47	5
Genk	2022–23	Belgian Pro League	39	11	3	0	0	0	42	11
Genk	2023–24	Belgian Pro League	25	6	1	0	9 (Note: Two appearances in UEFA Champions League, seven appearances and two goals in UEFA Europa Conference League)	2	35	8
Genk	2024–25	Belgian Pro League	36	0	4	0	—		40	0
Genk	2025–26	Belgian Pro League	38	4	2	1	14	2	54	7
Genk	2026–27	Belgian Pro League	9	1	1	0	0	0	10	1
Career total			317	35	28	2	54	6	399	43

=== International ===
As of match played 23 March 2025

Appearances and goals by national team and year
National team	Year	Apps	Goals
Belgium	2025	1	0
Total		1	0

== Honours ==
Genk

- Belgian First Division A: 2018–19
- Belgian Cup: 2020–21
- Goal of the Year: 2022 v Royal Antwerp
