= Jakub Piotrowski =

Polish footballer (born 1997)

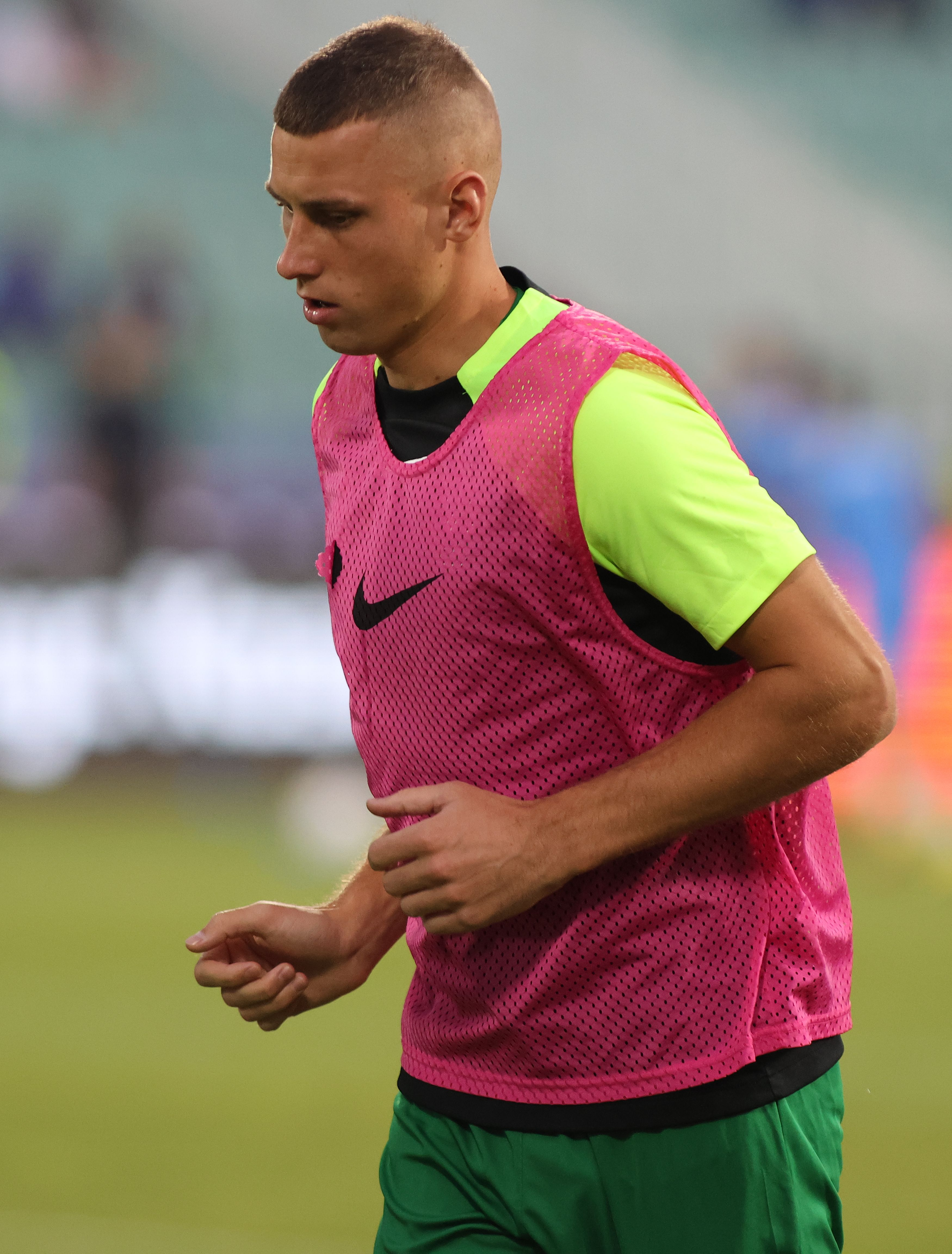
- Piotrowski with Ludogorets Razgrad in 2022

Personal information
- Full name: Jakub Piotrowski
- Date of birth: 4 October 1997 (age 29)
- Place of birth: Toruń, Poland
- Height: 1.88 m (6 ft 2 in)
- Position: Midfielder

Team information
- Current team: Udinese
- Number: 24

Youth career
- Unislavia Unisław
- 2009–2013: Chemik Bydgoszcz

Senior career*
Years	Team	Apps	(Gls)
2013–2014	Chemik Bydgoszcz	3	(1)
2014	Wda Świecie	10	(1)
2014–2016	Pogoń Szczecin II	25	(3)
2015–2018	Pogoń Szczecin	37	(3)
2017	→ Stomil Olsztyn (loan)	13	(0)
2018–2020	Genk	11	(0)
2020	→ Waasland-Beveren (loan)	5	(0)
2020–2022	Fortuna Düsseldorf	43	(1)
2021	Fortuna Düsseldorf II	1	(0)
2022–2025	Ludogorets Razgrad	86	(20)
2023–2024	Ludogorets Razgrad II	2	(1)
2025–	Udinese	33	(1)

International career^{‡}
2016	Poland U19	6	(0)
2016–2017	Poland U20	8	(0)
2017–2019	Poland U21	11	(0)
2023–	Poland	14	(2)
- * Club domestic league appearances and goals as of 25 May 2026 ‡ National team caps and goals as of 16:32, 31 May 2026 (UTC)

Jakub Piotrowski (born 4 October 1997) is a Polish professional footballer who plays as a midfielder for Serie A club Udinese and the Poland national team.

== Club career ==
Between 2015 and 2018, Piotrowski played for Polish side Pogoń Szczecin.

On 14 May 2018, he signed a three-year contract (with one year in option) with Belgian side KRC Genk.

On 28 July 2020, Piotrowski joined 2. Bundesliga club Fortuna Düsseldorf on a four-year contract.

On 28 July 2022, Piotrowski moved to Bulgaria to play for Ludogorets Razgrad in the Bulgarian First League.

On 2 August 2025, Piotrowski signed a four-year contract with Udinese in Italy.

== International career ==
From 2016 to 2019, Piotrowski played for various Polish youth national teams. He received his first call-up for the Poland senior squad for 2022–23 UEFA Nations League matches against Netherlands and Wales, played on 22 and 25 September 2022. Piotrowski was named in the provisional squad for the 2022 FIFA World Cup, however he was not included in the final 26-man squad.

On 12 October 2023, Piotrowski made his debut for the senior team against the Faroe Islands during a UEFA Euro 2024 qualifying match, a 2–0 victory.

On 7 June 2024, he was named in Poland's squad for UEFA Euro 2024.

== Career statistics ==
=== Club ===
As of match played 24 May 2026

Appearances and goals by club, season and competition
Club	Season	League			National cup (Note: Includes Polish Cup, Belgian Cup, DFB-Pokal, Bulgarian Cup, Coppa Italia)		Europe		Other		Total	
Club	Season	Division	Apps	Goals	Apps	Goals	Apps	Goals	Apps	Goals	Apps	Goals
Chemik Bydgoszcz	2013–14	Regional league	3	1	—		—		—		3	1
Wda Świecie	2014–15	III liga, gr. C	10	1	—		—		—		10	1
Pogoń Szczecin II	2014–15	III liga, gr. D	8	2	—		—		—		8	2
Pogoń Szczecin II	2015–16	III liga, gr. D	12	1	—		—		—		12	1
Pogoń Szczecin II	2016–17	III liga, gr. II	5	0	—		—		—		5	0
Pogoń Szczecin II	Total		25	3	—		—		—		25	3
Pogoń Szczecin	2015–16	Ekstraklasa	4	0	0	0	—		—		4	0
Pogoń Szczecin	2016–17	Ekstraklasa	4	0	3	0	—		—		7	0
Pogoń Szczecin	2017–18	Ekstraklasa	29	3	2	0	—		—		31	3
Pogoń Szczecin	Total		37	3	5	0	—		—		42	3
Stomil Olsztyn (loan)	2016–17	I liga	13	0	—		—		—		13	0
Genk	2018–19	Belgian Pro League	5	0	2	0	6 (Note: Appearance(s) in UEFA Europa League)	1	—		13	1
Genk	2019–20	Belgian Pro League	6	0	1	0	0	0	1 (Note: Appearance in Belgian Super Cup)	0	8	0
Genk	Total		11	0	3	0	6	1	1	0	26	1
Waasland-Beveren (loan)	2019–20	Belgian Pro League	5	0	—		—		—		5	0
Fortuna Düsseldorf	2020–21	2. Bundesliga	13	0	1	0	—		—		14	0
Fortuna Düsseldorf	2021–22	2. Bundesliga	28	1	2	0	—		—		30	1
Fortuna Düsseldorf	2022–23	2. Bundesliga	2	0	—		—		—		2	0
Fortuna Düsseldorf	Total		43	1	3	0	—		—		46	1
Fortuna Düsseldorf II	2020–21	Regionalliga West	1	0	—		—		—		1	0
Ludogorets Razgrad	2022–23	efbet Liga	30	3	6	0	11 (Note: Two appearances in UEFA Champions League, eight appearances in UEFA Europa League, one appearance in UEFA Europa Conference League)	0	1 (Note: Appearance in Bulgarian Supercup)	0	48	3
Ludogorets Razgrad	2023–24	efbet Liga	31	11	4	0	15 (Note: Three appearances in UEFA Champions League, four appearances and two goals in UEFA Europa League, eight appearances and four goals in UEFA Europa Conference League)	6	1	0	51	17
Ludogorets Razgrad	2024–25	efbet Liga	25	6	2	0	14 (Note: Six appearances in UEFA Champions League, eight appearances in UEFA Europa League)	0	1	1	42	7
Ludogorets Razgrad	2025–26	efbet Liga	0	0	—		4 (Note: Four appearances and one goal in UEFA Champions League)	1	—		4	1
Ludogorets Razgrad	Total		86	20	12	0	44	7	3	1	145	28
Ludogorets Razgrad II	2022–23	Second League	1	1	—		—		—		1	1
Ludogorets Razgrad II	2024–25	Second League	1	0	—		—		—		1	0
Ludogorets Razgrad II	Total		2	1	0	0	0	0	0	0	2	1
Udinese	2025–26	Serie A	33	1	2	0	—		—		35	1
Career total			269	31	25	0	50	8	4	1	348	40

=== International ===
As of match played 31 May 2026

Appearances and goals by national team and year
National team	Year	Apps	Goals
Poland	2023	3	1
Poland	2024	7	1
Poland	2025	3	0
Poland	2026	1	0
Total		14	2

Scores and results list Poland's goal tally first, score column indicates score after each Piotrowski goal.

List of international goals scored by Jakub Piotrowski
No.	Date	Venue	Opponent	Score	Result	Competition
1	17 November 2023	National Stadium, Warsaw, Poland	Czech Republic	1–0	1–1	UEFA Euro 2024 qualifying
2	24 March 2024	National Stadium, Warsaw, Poland	Estonia	3–0	5–1	UEFA Euro 2024 qualifying

== Honours ==
Genk

- Belgian First Division A: 2018–19

Ludogorets Razgrad

- Bulgarian First League: 2022–23, 2023–24, 2024–25
- Bulgarian Cup: 2022–23, 2024–25
- Bulgarian Supercup: 2022, 2023, 2024

Individual

- Bulgarian First League Best Midfielder: 2023
- Bulgarian First League Best Foreign Player: 2023
