= Sofiane Bouzian =

Belgian footballer

Personal information
- Full name: Sofiane Hassan Bouzian
- Date of birth: 13 July 2000 (age 26)
- Place of birth: Belgium
- Height: 1.87 m (6 ft 2 in)
- Position: Goalkeeper

Team information
- Current team: Wezel Sport
- Number: 1

Youth career
- Anderlecht
- 2015–2018: Mechelen

Senior career*
Years	Team	Apps	(Gls)
2019–2021	Mechelen	1	(0)
2021–2023	Tienen	43	(0)
2023–2025	Rupel Boom	24	(0)
2025–	Wezel Sport	0	(0)
- * Club domestic league appearances and goals as of 16 January 2026

Sofiane Hassan Bouzian (born 13 July 2000) is a Belgian professional footballer who plays as a Goalkeeper for Wezel Sport.

== Club career ==
On 27 August 2021, he signed a two-year contract with Tienen in the third-tier Belgian National Division 1.

== Personal life ==
Born in Belgium, Bouzian is of Moroccan descent.
