= Dieumerci Ndongala =

Congolese footballer (born 1991)

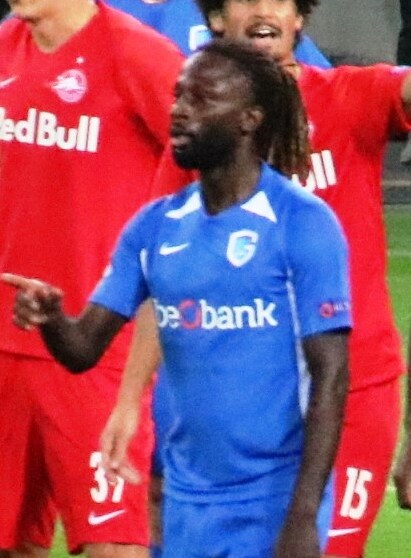
- Ndongala with Genk in 2019

Personal information
- Date of birth: 14 June 1991 (age 35)
- Place of birth: Kinshasa, Zaire
- Height: 1.70 m (5 ft 7 in)
- Position: Winger

Team information
- Current team: Francs Borains
- Number: 11

Youth career
- –2011: Standard Liège

Senior career*
Years	Team	Apps	(Gls)
2011–2013	Jeunesse Esch	33	(7)
2013–2014	La Louvière	26	(9)
2014–2016	Charleroi	74	(12)
2016–2017	Gent	9	(0)
2017–2018	Standard Liège	20	(0)
2018	→ Genk (loan)	15	(5)
2018–2020	Genk	47	(6)
2020	→ Kasımpaşa (loan)	14	(2)
2020–2025	APOEL	117	(14)
2025–2026	Bandırmaspor	46	(2)
2026–	Francs Borains	5	(0)

International career^{‡}
2015–	DR Congo	1	(0)
- * Club domestic league appearances and goals as of 18 September 2026 ‡ National team caps and goals as of 17:34, 20 August 2020 (UTC)

Dieumerci Ndongala (born 14 June 1991) is a Congolese professional footballer who plays as a winger for Challenger Pro League club Francs Borains in Belgium and the DR Congo national team.

== Club career ==
In 2014, Ndongala joined Belgian Pro League side Charleroi from La Louvière. He made his Belgian Pro League debut at 8 February 2014 in a 3–1 away defeat against Lokeren. He scored his first Belgian Pro League goal at 3 May 2014 in a 2–1 away defeat against K.V. Kortrijk.

On 31 January 2017, Ndongala returned to Standard Liège.

== Career statistics ==
As of match played 31 March 2024

Club	Season	League			Cup		Continental		Other		Total	
Club	Season	Division	Apps	Goals	Apps	Goals	Apps	Goals	Apps	Goals	Apps	Goals
Jeunesse Esch	2011–12	Luxembourg National Division	24	5	2	1	—		—		26	6
Jeunesse Esch	2012–13	Luxembourg National Division	9	2	0	0	2	0	—		11	2
Jeunesse Esch	Total		33	7	2	1	2	0	—		37	8
Charleroi	2013–14	Belgian Pro League	7	1	—		—		—		7	1
Charleroi	2014–15	Belgian Pro League	32	5	3	0	—		—		35	5
Charleroi	2015–16	Belgian Pro League	35	6	2	0	4	1	—		41	7
Charleroi	Total		74	12	5	0	4	1	—		83	13
Gent	2016–17	Belgian First Division A	9	0	1	0	3	0	—		13	0
Standard Liège	2016–17	Belgian First Division A	5	0	—		—		—		5	0
Standard Liège	2017–18	Belgian First Division A	15	0	2	0	—		—		17	0
Standard Liège	Total		20	0	2	0	—		—		22	0
Genk (loan)	2017–18	Belgian First Division A	16	5	1	0	—		—		17	5
Genk	2018–19	Belgian First Division A	31	4	1	0	11	2	—		43	6
Genk	2019–20	Belgian First Division A	11	0	2	0	3	0	1	0	17	0
Genk	Total		42	4	3	0	14	2	1	0	60	6
Kasımpaşa (loan)	2019–20	Süper Lig	14	2	2	0	—		—		16	2
APOEL	2020–21	Cypriot First Division	25	2	5	0	4	1	—		34	3
APOEL	2021–22	Cypriot First Division	23	4	3	0	—		—		26	4
APOEL	2022–23	Cypriot First Division	23	1	1	0	6	0	—		30	1
APOEL	2023–24	Cypriot First Division	30	7	0	0	3	1	—		33	8
APOEL	Total		101	14	9	0	13	2	0	0	123	16
Career total			309	44	25	1	36	5	1	0	371	50

== Honours ==
=== Club ===
APOEL

- Cypriot First Division: 2023–24

Genk

- Belgian First Division: 2018–19
