= 2025–26 UEFA Europa League league phase =

International football club competition in Europe

The 2025–26 UEFA Europa League league phase began on 24 September 2025 and ended on 29 January 2026. A total of 36 teams competed in the league phase to decide the 24 places in the knockout phase of the 2025–26 UEFA Europa League.

Aston Villa, Bologna, Brann, Go Ahead Eagles and Nottingham Forest made their debut appearances since the introduction of the group stage (although Aston Villa and Brann had previously appeared in the UEFA Cup group stage). Go Ahead Eagles and Nottingham Forest made their debut appearances in a major UEFA competition group or league phase.

A total of 23 national associations were represented in the league phase.

== Format ==
Each team played eight matches, four at home and four away, against eight different opponents, with all 36 teams ranked in a single league table (known as the Swiss system). Teams were separated into four pots based on their 2025 UEFA club coefficients, and each team played two teams from each of the four pots – one at home and one away. The top eight teams in the standings received a bye to the round of 16. The teams ranked from 9th to 24th contested the knockout phase play-offs, with the teams ranked from 9th to 16th seeded for the draw. Teams ranked from 25th to 36th were eliminated from European competition.

=== Tiebreakers ===
Teams were ranked according to points (3 points for a win, 1 point for a draw, 0 points for a loss). If two or more teams were equal on points upon completion of the league phase, the following tiebreaking criteria were applied, in the order given, to determine their rankings:

While the league phase was in progress, teams were ranked according to criteria 1–5 only, and if still tied, were given equal ranking and sorted alphabetically. Criteria 6–10 were only used after the final matches took place.

1. Goal difference;
2. Goals scored;
3. Away goals scored;
4. Wins;
5. Away wins;
6. Higher number of points obtained collectively by league phase opponents;
7. Superior collective goal difference of league phase opponents;
8. Higher number of goals scored collectively by league phase opponents;
9. Lower disciplinary points total (direct red card or expulsion for two yellow cards in one match = 3 points, yellow card = 1 point);
10. UEFA club coefficient.

== Teams and seeding ==
The 36 teams were divided into four pots of nine teams each, with teams allocated to pots based on their 2025 UEFA club coefficients. The participants included:

- 13 teams which entered at this stage
- 12 winners of the play-off round
- 7 losers of the Champions League play-off round (5 from the Champions Path, 2 from the League Path)
- 4 losers of the Champions League third qualifying round (League Path)

Key to colours
Teams ranked 1 to 8 advanced to the round of 16 as a seeded team
Teams ranked 9 to 16 advanced to the knockout phase play-offs as a seeded team
Teams ranked 17 to 24 advanced to the knockout phase play-offs as an unseeded team

Pot 1
Team	Notes	Coeff.
(Italian Football Federation) Roma		104.500
(Portuguese Football Federation) Porto		79.750
(Scottish Football Association) Rangers		71.250
(Royal Dutch Football Association) Feyenoord		71.000
(French Football Federation) Lille		66.000
(Croatian Football Federation) Dinamo Zagreb		56.000
(Royal Spanish Football Federation) Real Betis		52.250
(Austrian Football Association) Red Bull Salzburg		48.000
(The Football Association) Aston Villa		47.250

Pot 2
Team	Notes	Coeff.
(Turkish Football Federation) Fenerbahçe		47.250
(Portuguese Football Federation) Braga		46.000
(Football Association of Serbia) Red Star Belgrade		44.000
(French Football Federation) Lyon		43.750
(Hellenic Football Federation) PAOK		42.250
(Football Association of the Czech Republic) Viktoria Plzeň		39.250
(Hungarian Football Federation) Ferencváros		39.000
(Scottish Football Association) Celtic		38.000
(Israel Football Association) Maccabi Tel Aviv		37.500

Pot 3
Team	Notes	Coeff.
(Swiss Football Association) Young Boys		34.500
(Swiss Football Association) Basel		33.000
(Danish Football Association) Midtjylland		32.750
(German Football Association) SC Freiburg		28.000
(Bulgarian Football Union) Ludogorets Razgrad		24.000
(The Football Association) Nottingham Forest		23.039
(Austrian Football Association) Sturm Graz		23.000
(Romanian Football Federation) FCSB		22.500
(French Football Federation) Nice		20.000

Pot 4
Team	Notes	Coeff.
(Italian Football Federation) Bologna		19.446
(Royal Spanish Football Federation) Celta Vigo		18.890
(German Football Association) VfB Stuttgart		17.266
(Hellenic Football Federation) Panathinaikos		16.000
(Swedish Football Association) Malmö FF		14.500
(Royal Dutch Football Association) Go Ahead Eagles		13.430
(Royal Dutch Football Association) Utrecht		13.430
(Royal Belgian Football Association) Genk		11.370
(Norwegian Football Federation) Brann		7.937

Notes

1. ^{EL-PO} Winners of play-off round
2. ^{CL-CH} Losers of Champions League play-off round (Champions Path)
3. ^{CL-LP} Losers of Champions League play-off round (League Path)
4. ^{CL-L3} Losers of Champions League third qualifying round (League Path)

== Draw ==
The draw for the league phase pairings was held at the Grimaldi Forum in Monaco on 29 August 2025, 13:00 CEST, along with the draw for the Conference League league phase. The automated draw software instantly conducted the full digital draw at random, determining the home and away matches for all clubs. Each team faced two opponents from each of the four pots, one of which they faced at home and one away. Teams could not face opponents from their own association, and could only be drawn against a maximum of two sides from the same association. The draw results were then be revealed pot-by-pot, starting with Pot 1, with the intention of "maintaining suspense and clarity for viewers". This was a change of format from the previous season, where teams were individually drawn before their opponents were digitally determined.

League phase opponents by club
Club	Pot 1 opponents		Pot 2 opponents		Pot 3 opponents		Pot 4 opponents		Avg coeff.
Club	Home	Away	Home	Away	Home	Away	Home	Away	Avg coeff.
(Italian Football Federation) Roma	Lille	Rangers	Viktoria Plzeň	Celtic	Midtjylland	Nice	VfB Stuttgart	Panathinaikos	37.6
(Portuguese Football Federation) Porto	Rangers	Red Bull Salzburg	Red Star Belgrade	Viktoria Plzeň	Nice	Nottingham Forest	Malmö FF	Utrecht	34.2
(Scottish Football Association) Rangers	Roma	Porto	Braga	Ferencváros	Ludogorets Razgrad	Sturm Graz	Genk	Brann	41.9
(Royal Dutch Football Association) Feyenoord	Aston Villa	Real Betis	Celtic	Braga	Sturm Graz	FCSB	Panathinaikos	VfB Stuttgart	32.8
(French Football Federation) Lille	Dinamo Zagreb	Roma	PAOK	Red Star Belgrade	SC Freiburg	Young Boys	Brann	Celta Vigo	42.0
(Croatian Football Federation) Dinamo Zagreb	Real Betis	Lille	Fenerbahçe	Maccabi Tel Aviv	FCSB	Midtjylland	Celta Vigo	Malmö FF	36.5
(Royal Spanish Football Federation) Real Betis	Feyenoord	Dinamo Zagreb	Lyon	PAOK	Nottingham Forest	Ludogorets Razgrad	Utrecht	Genk	35.6
(Austrian Football Association) Red Bull Salzburg	Porto	Aston Villa	Ferencváros	Lyon	Basel	SC Freiburg	Go Ahead Eagles	Bologna	38.0
(The Football Association) Aston Villa	Red Bull Salzburg	Feyenoord	Maccabi Tel Aviv	Fenerbahçe	Young Boys	Basel	Bologna	Go Ahead Eagles	38.0
(Turkish Football Federation) Fenerbahçe	Aston Villa	Dinamo Zagreb	Ferencváros	Viktoria Plzeň	Nice	FCSB	VfB Stuttgart	Brann	31.2
(Portuguese Football Federation) Braga	Feyenoord	Rangers	Red Star Belgrade	Celtic	Nottingham Forest	Nice	Genk	Go Ahead Eagles	36.5
(Football Association of Serbia) Red Star Belgrade	Lille	Porto	Celtic	Braga	FCSB	Sturm Graz	Celta Vigo	Malmö FF	38.6
(French Football Federation) Lyon	Red Bull Salzburg	Real Betis	PAOK	Maccabi Tel Aviv	Basel	Young Boys	Go Ahead Eagles	Utrecht	34.3
(Hellenic Football Federation) PAOK	Real Betis	Lille	Maccabi Tel Aviv	Lyon	Young Boys	Ludogorets Razgrad	Brann	Celta Vigo	35.6
(Football Association of the Czech Republic) Viktoria Plzeň	Porto	Roma	Fenerbahçe	Ferencváros	SC Freiburg	Basel	Malmö FF	Panathinaikos	45.3
(Hungarian Football Federation) Ferencváros	Rangers	Red Bull Salzburg	Viktoria Plzeň	Fenerbahçe	Ludogorets Razgrad	Nottingham Forest	Panathinaikos	Genk	35.0
(Scottish Football Association) Celtic	Roma	Feyenoord	Braga	Red Star Belgrade	Sturm Graz	Midtjylland	Utrecht	Bologna	44.3
(Israel Football Association) Maccabi Tel Aviv	Dinamo Zagreb	Aston Villa	Lyon	PAOK	Midtjylland	SC Freiburg	Bologna	VfB Stuttgart	35.8
(Swiss Football Association) Young Boys	Lille	Aston Villa	Lyon	PAOK	Ludogorets Razgrad	FCSB	Panathinaikos	VfB Stuttgart	34.9
(Swiss Football Association) Basel	Aston Villa	Red Bull Salzburg	Viktoria Plzeň	Lyon	FCSB	SC Freiburg	VfB Stuttgart	Genk	32.2
(Danish Football Association) Midtjylland	Dinamo Zagreb	Roma	Celtic	Maccabi Tel Aviv	Sturm Graz	Nottingham Forest	Genk	Brann	37.7
(German Football Association) SC Freiburg	Red Bull Salzburg	Lille	Maccabi Tel Aviv	Viktoria Plzeň	Basel	Nice	Utrecht	Bologna	34.6
(Bulgarian Football Union) Ludogorets Razgrad	Real Betis	Rangers	PAOK	Ferencváros	Nice	Young Boys	Celta Vigo	Malmö FF	36.6
(The Football Association) Nottingham Forest	Porto	Real Betis	Ferencváros	Braga	Midtjylland	Sturm Graz	Malmö FF	Utrecht	37.6
(Austrian Football Association) Sturm Graz	Rangers	Feyenoord	Red Star Belgrade	Celtic	Nottingham Forest	Midtjylland	Brann	Panathinaikos	38.0
(Romanian Football Federation) FCSB	Feyenoord	Dinamo Zagreb	Fenerbahçe	Red Star Belgrade	Young Boys	Basel	Bologna	Go Ahead Eagles	39.8
(French Football Federation) Nice	Roma	Porto	Braga	Fenerbahçe	SC Freiburg	Ludogorets Razgrad	Go Ahead Eagles	Celta Vigo	45.2
(Italian Football Federation) Bologna	Red Bull Salzburg	Aston Villa	Celtic	Maccabi Tel Aviv	SC Freiburg	FCSB	Brann	Celta Vigo	31.0
(Royal Spanish Football Federation) Celta Vigo	Lille	Dinamo Zagreb	PAOK	Red Star Belgrade	Nice	Ludogorets Razgrad	Bologna	VfB Stuttgart	36.1
(German Football Association) VfB Stuttgart	Feyenoord	Roma	Maccabi Tel Aviv	Fenerbahçe	Young Boys	Basel	Celta Vigo	Go Ahead Eagles	45.0
(Hellenic Football Federation) Panathinaikos	Roma	Feyenoord	Viktoria Plzeň	Ferencváros	Sturm Graz	Young Boys	Go Ahead Eagles	Malmö FF	42.4
(Swedish Football Association) Malmö FF	Dinamo Zagreb	Porto	Red Star Belgrade	Viktoria Plzeň	Ludogorets Razgrad	Nottingham Forest	Panathinaikos	Genk	36.7
(Royal Dutch Football Association) Go Ahead Eagles	Aston Villa	Red Bull Salzburg	Braga	Lyon	FCSB	Nice	VfB Stuttgart	Panathinaikos	32.6
(Royal Dutch Football Association) Utrecht	Porto	Real Betis	Lyon	Celtic	Nottingham Forest	SC Freiburg	Genk	Brann	35.5
(Royal Belgian Football Association) Genk	Real Betis	Rangers	Ferencváros	Braga	Basel	Midtjylland	Malmö FF	Utrecht	37.8
(Norwegian Football Federation) Brann	Rangers	Lille	Fenerbahçe	PAOK	Midtjylland	Sturm Graz	Utrecht	Bologna	39.4

== League phase table ==
The top eight ranked teams receive a bye directly to the round of 16. Teams ranked from 9th to 24th contest the knockout phase play-offs, with teams ranked from 9th to 16th seeded for the draw, while those ranked from 17th to 24th are not. Teams ranked from 25th to 36th are eliminated from all competitions.

Pos	Team	Pld	W	D	L	GF	GA	GD	Pts	Qualification
1	(French Football Federation) Lyon	8	7	0	1	18	5	+13	21	Advance to round of 16 (seeded)
2	(The Football Association) Aston Villa	8	7	0	1	14	6	+8	21	Advance to round of 16 (seeded)
3	(Danish Football Association) Midtjylland	8	6	1	1	18	8	+10	19	Advance to round of 16 (seeded)
4	(Royal Spanish Football Federation) Real Betis	8	5	2	1	13	7	+6	17 (Note: Away goals scored: Real Betis 5, Porto 3.)	Advance to round of 16 (seeded)
5	(Portuguese Football Federation) Porto	8	5	2	1	13	7	+6	17	Advance to round of 16 (seeded)
6	(Portuguese Football Federation) Braga	8	5	2	1	11	5	+6	17	Advance to round of 16 (seeded)
7	(German Football Association) SC Freiburg	8	5	2	1	10	4	+6	17	Advance to round of 16 (seeded)
8	(Italian Football Federation) Roma	8	5	1	2	13	6	+7	16	Advance to round of 16 (seeded)
9	(Royal Belgian Football Association) Genk	8	5	1	2	11	7	+4	16	Advance to knockout phase play-offs (seeded)
10	(Italian Football Federation) Bologna	8	4	3	1	14	7	+7	15	Advance to knockout phase play-offs (seeded)
11	(German Football Association) VfB Stuttgart	8	5	0	3	15	9	+6	15	Advance to knockout phase play-offs (seeded)
12	(Hungarian Football Federation) Ferencváros	8	4	3	1	12	11	+1	15	Advance to knockout phase play-offs (seeded)
13	(The Football Association) Nottingham Forest	8	4	2	2	15	7	+8	14	Advance to knockout phase play-offs (seeded)
14	(Football Association of the Czech Republic) Viktoria Plzeň	8	3	5	0	8	3	+5	14	Advance to knockout phase play-offs (seeded)
15	(Football Association of Serbia) Red Star Belgrade	8	4	2	2	7	6	+1	14	Advance to knockout phase play-offs (seeded)
16	(Royal Spanish Football Federation) Celta Vigo	8	4	1	3	15	11	+4	13	Advance to knockout phase play-offs (seeded)
17	(Hellenic Football Federation) PAOK	8	3	3	2	17	14	+3	12	Advance to knockout phase play-offs (unseeded)
18	(French Football Federation) Lille	8	4	0	4	12	9	+3	12	Advance to knockout phase play-offs (unseeded)
19	(Turkish Football Federation) Fenerbahçe	8	3	3	2	10	7	+3	12	Advance to knockout phase play-offs (unseeded)
20	(Hellenic Football Federation) Panathinaikos	8	3	3	2	11	9	+2	12	Advance to knockout phase play-offs (unseeded)
21	(Scottish Football Association) Celtic	8	3	2	3	13	15	−2	11	Advance to knockout phase play-offs (unseeded)
22	(Bulgarian Football Union) Ludogorets Razgrad	8	3	1	4	12	15	−3	10	Advance to knockout phase play-offs (unseeded)
23	(Croatian Football Federation) Dinamo Zagreb	8	3	1	4	12	16	−4	10	Advance to knockout phase play-offs (unseeded)
24	(Norwegian Football Federation) Brann	8	2	3	3	9	11	−2	9	Advance to knockout phase play-offs (unseeded)
25	(Swiss Football Association) Young Boys	8	3	0	5	10	16	−6	9	
26	(Austrian Football Association) Sturm Graz	8	2	1	5	5	11	−6	7	
27	(Romanian Football Federation) FCSB	8	2	1	5	9	16	−7	7	
28	(Royal Dutch Football Association) Go Ahead Eagles	8	2	1	5	6	14	−8	7	
29	(Royal Dutch Football Association) Feyenoord	8	2	0	6	11	15	−4	6	
30	(Swiss Football Association) Basel	8	2	0	6	9	13	−4	6	
31	(Austrian Football Association) Red Bull Salzburg	8	2	0	6	10	15	−5	6	
32	(Scottish Football Association) Rangers	8	1	1	6	5	14	−9	4	
33	(French Football Federation) Nice	8	1	0	7	7	15	−8	3	
34	(Royal Dutch Football Association) Utrecht	8	0	1	7	5	15	−10	1	
35	(Swedish Football Association) Malmö FF	8	0	1	7	4	15	−11	1	
36	(Israel Football Association) Maccabi Tel Aviv	8	0	1	7	2	22	−20	1	

Source: UEFA
Rules for classification: League phase tiebreakers

== Results summary ==
=== By matchday ===
Matchday 1
Home team	Score	Away team
Midtjylland (Denmark)	2–0	(Austria) Sturm Graz
PAOK (Greece)	0–0	(Israel) Maccabi Tel Aviv
Red Star Belgrade (Serbia)	1–1	(Scotland) Celtic
Dinamo Zagreb (Croatia)	3–1	(Turkey) Fenerbahçe
Malmö FF (Sweden)	1–2	(Bulgaria) Ludogorets Razgrad
Nice (France)	1–2	(Italy) Roma
Real Betis (Spain)	2–2	(England) Nottingham Forest
Braga (Portugal)	1–0	(Netherlands) Feyenoord
SC Freiburg (Germany)	2–1	(Switzerland) Basel
Go Ahead Eagles (Netherlands)	0–1	(Romania) FCSB
Lille (France)	2–1	(Norway) Brann
Aston Villa (England)	1–0	(Italy) Bologna
Young Boys (Switzerland)	1–4	(Greece) Panathinaikos
Red Bull Salzburg (Austria)	0–1	(Portugal) Porto
Utrecht (Netherlands)	0–1	(France) Lyon
Ferencváros (Hungary)	1–1	(Czech Republic) Viktoria Plzeň
Rangers (Scotland)	0–1	(Belgium) Genk
VfB Stuttgart (Germany)	2–1	(Spain) Celta Vigo

Matchday 2
Home team	Score	Away team
Roma (Italy)	0–1	(France) Lille
Bologna (Italy)	1–1	(Germany) SC Freiburg
Celtic (Scotland)	0–2	(Portugal) Braga
Viktoria Plzeň (Czech Republic)	3–0	(Sweden) Malmö FF
Fenerbahçe (Turkey)	2–1	(France) Nice
FCSB (Romania)	0–2	(Switzerland) Young Boys
Panathinaikos (Greece)	1–2	(Netherlands) Go Ahead Eagles
Ludogorets Razgrad (Bulgaria)	0–2	(Spain) Real Betis
Brann (Norway)	1–0	(Netherlands) Utrecht
Basel (Switzerland)	2–0	(Germany) VfB Stuttgart
Porto (Portugal)	2–1	(Serbia) Red Star Belgrade
Feyenoord (Netherlands)	0–2	(England) Aston Villa
Genk (Belgium)	0–1	(Hungary) Ferencváros
Maccabi Tel Aviv (Israel)	1–3	(Croatia) Dinamo Zagreb
Nottingham Forest (England)	2–3	(Denmark) Midtjylland
Lyon (France)	2–0	(Austria) Red Bull Salzburg
Celta Vigo (Spain)	3–1	(Greece) PAOK
Sturm Graz (Austria)	2–1	(Scotland) Rangers

Matchday 3
Home team	Score	Away team
Red Bull Salzburg (Austria)	2–3	(Hungary) Ferencváros
Fenerbahçe (Turkey)	1–0	(Germany) VfB Stuttgart
FCSB (Romania)	1–2	(Italy) Bologna
Go Ahead Eagles (Netherlands)	2–1	(England) Aston Villa
Genk (Belgium)	0–0	(Spain) Real Betis
Lyon (France)	2–0	(Switzerland) Basel
Braga (Portugal)	2–0	(Serbia) Red Star Belgrade
Brann (Norway)	3–0	(Scotland) Rangers
Feyenoord (Netherlands)	3–1	(Greece) Panathinaikos
Roma (Italy)	1–2	(Czech Republic) Viktoria Plzeň
Young Boys (Switzerland)	3–2	(Bulgaria) Ludogorets Razgrad
Celtic (Scotland)	2–1	(Austria) Sturm Graz
Lille (France)	3–4	(Greece) PAOK
Maccabi Tel Aviv (Israel)	0–3	(Denmark) Midtjylland
Malmö FF (Sweden)	1–1	(Croatia) Dinamo Zagreb
Nottingham Forest (England)	2–0	(Portugal) Porto
Celta Vigo (Spain)	2–1	(France) Nice
SC Freiburg (Germany)	2–0	(Netherlands) Utrecht

Matchday 4
Home team	Score	Away team
Red Bull Salzburg (Austria)	2–0	(Netherlands) Go Ahead Eagles
Basel (Switzerland)	3–1	(Romania) FCSB
Midtjylland (Denmark)	3–1	(Scotland) Celtic
Utrecht (Netherlands)	1–1	(Portugal) Porto
Red Star Belgrade (Serbia)	1–0	(France) Lille
Dinamo Zagreb (Croatia)	0–3	(Spain) Celta Vigo
Malmö FF (Sweden)	0–1	(Greece) Panathinaikos
Nice (France)	1–3	(Germany) SC Freiburg
Sturm Graz (Austria)	0–0	(England) Nottingham Forest
Aston Villa (England)	2–0	(Israel) Maccabi Tel Aviv
Bologna (Italy)	0–0	(Norway) Brann
Viktoria Plzeň (Czech Republic)	0–0	(Turkey) Fenerbahçe
Ferencváros (Hungary)	3–1	(Bulgaria) Ludogorets Razgrad
PAOK (Greece)	4–0	(Switzerland) Young Boys
Rangers (Scotland)	0–2	(Italy) Roma
Real Betis (Spain)	2–0	(France) Lyon
Braga (Portugal)	3–4	(Belgium) Genk
VfB Stuttgart (Germany)	2–0	(Netherlands) Feyenoord

Matchday 5
Home team	Score	Away team
Roma (Italy)	2–1	(Denmark) Midtjylland
Aston Villa (England)	2–1	(Switzerland) Young Boys
Porto (Portugal)	3–0	(France) Nice
Viktoria Plzeň (Czech Republic)	0–0	(Germany) SC Freiburg
Fenerbahçe (Turkey)	1–1	(Hungary) Ferencváros
Feyenoord (Netherlands)	1–3	(Scotland) Celtic
Lille (France)	4–0	(Croatia) Dinamo Zagreb
PAOK (Greece)	1–1	(Norway) Brann
Ludogorets Razgrad (Bulgaria)	3–2	(Spain) Celta Vigo
Bologna (Italy)	4–1	(Austria) Red Bull Salzburg
Red Star Belgrade (Serbia)	1–0	(Romania) FCSB
Go Ahead Eagles (Netherlands)	0–4	(Germany) VfB Stuttgart
Genk (Belgium)	2–1	(Switzerland) Basel
Maccabi Tel Aviv (Israel)	0–6	(France) Lyon
Nottingham Forest (England)	3–0	(Sweden) Malmö FF
Panathinaikos (Greece)	2–1	(Austria) Sturm Graz
Rangers (Scotland)	1–1	(Portugal) Braga
Real Betis (Spain)	2–1	(Netherlands) Utrecht

Matchday 6
Home team	Score	Away team
Young Boys (Switzerland)	1–0	(France) Lille
Midtjylland (Denmark)	1–0	(Belgium) Genk
Utrecht (Netherlands)	1–2	(England) Nottingham Forest
Ferencváros (Hungary)	2–1	(Scotland) Rangers
Dinamo Zagreb (Croatia)	1–3	(Spain) Real Betis
Nice (France)	0–1	(Portugal) Braga
Ludogorets Razgrad (Bulgaria)	3–3	(Greece) PAOK
Sturm Graz (Austria)	0–1	(Serbia) Red Star Belgrade
VfB Stuttgart (Germany)	4–1	(Israel) Maccabi Tel Aviv
Celtic (Scotland)	0–3	(Italy) Roma
Porto (Portugal)	2–1	(Sweden) Malmö FF
Basel (Switzerland)	1–2	(England) Aston Villa
FCSB (Romania)	4–3	(Netherlands) Feyenoord
Lyon (France)	2–1	(Netherlands) Go Ahead Eagles
Panathinaikos (Greece)	0–0	(Czech Republic) Viktoria Plzeň
Celta Vigo (Spain)	1–2	(Italy) Bologna
SC Freiburg (Germany)	1–0	(Austria) Red Bull Salzburg
Brann (Norway)	0–4	(Turkey) Fenerbahçe

Matchday 7
Home team	Score	Away team
Bologna (Italy)	2–2	(Scotland) Celtic
Young Boys (Switzerland)	0–1	(France) Lyon
Viktoria Plzeň (Czech Republic)	1–1	(Portugal) Porto
Fenerbahçe (Turkey)	0–1	(England) Aston Villa
Feyenoord (Netherlands)	3–0	(Austria) Sturm Graz
Malmö FF (Sweden)	0–1	(Serbia) Red Star Belgrade
PAOK (Greece)	2–0	(Spain) Real Betis
SC Freiburg (Germany)	1–0	(Israel) Maccabi Tel Aviv
Brann (Norway)	3–3	(Denmark) Midtjylland
Roma (Italy)	2–0	(Germany) VfB Stuttgart
Red Bull Salzburg (Austria)	3–1	(Switzerland) Basel
Ferencváros (Hungary)	1–1	(Greece) Panathinaikos
Dinamo Zagreb (Croatia)	4–1	(Romania) FCSB
Nice (France)	3–1	(Netherlands) Go Ahead Eagles
Rangers (Scotland)	1–0	(Bulgaria) Ludogorets Razgrad
Celta Vigo (Spain)	2–1	(France) Lille
Braga (Portugal)	1–0	(England) Nottingham Forest
Utrecht (Netherlands)	0–2	(Belgium) Genk

Matchday 8
Home team	Score	Away team
Aston Villa (England)	3–2	(Austria) Red Bull Salzburg
Celtic (Scotland)	4–2	(Netherlands) Utrecht
Porto (Portugal)	3–1	(Scotland) Rangers
Basel (Switzerland)	0–1	(Czech Republic) Viktoria Plzeň
Midtjylland (Denmark)	2–0	(Croatia) Dinamo Zagreb
Red Star Belgrade (Serbia)	1–1	(Spain) Celta Vigo
FCSB (Romania)	1–1	(Turkey) Fenerbahçe
Go Ahead Eagles (Netherlands)	0–0	(Portugal) Braga
Genk (Belgium)	2–1	(Sweden) Malmö FF
Lille (France)	1–0	(Germany) SC Freiburg
Maccabi Tel Aviv (Israel)	0–3	(Italy) Bologna
Nottingham Forest (England)	4–0	(Hungary) Ferencváros
Lyon (France)	4–2	(Greece) PAOK
Panathinaikos (Greece)	1–1	(Italy) Roma
Ludogorets Razgrad (Bulgaria)	1–0	(France) Nice
Real Betis (Spain)	2–1	(Netherlands) Feyenoord
Sturm Graz (Austria)	1–0	(Norway) Brann
VfB Stuttgart (Germany)	3–2	(Switzerland) Young Boys

=== By team ===
Results by Pot 1 team
Team	Matchday							
Team	1	2	3	4	5	6	7	8
(Italy) Roma	NIC (A)	LIL (H)	PLZ (H)	RAN (A)	MID (H)	CEL (A)	STU (H)	PAN (A)
(Italy) Roma	2–1	0–1	1–2	2–0	2–1	3–0	2–0	1–1
(Portugal) Porto	SAL (A)	RSB (H)	NFO (A)	UTR (A)	NIC (H)	MAL (H)	PLZ (A)	RAN (H)
(Portugal) Porto	1–0	2–1	0–2	1–1	3–0	2–1	1–1	3–1
(Scotland) Rangers	GNK (H)	STM (A)	BRN (A)	ROM (H)	BRA (H)	FER (A)	LUD (H)	POR (A)
(Scotland) Rangers	0–1	1–2	0–3	0–2	1–1	1–2	1–0	1–3
(Netherlands) Feyenoord	BRA (A)	AVL (H)	PAN (H)	STU (A)	CEL (H)	FCSB (A)	STM (H)	BET (A)
(Netherlands) Feyenoord	0–1	0–2	3–1	0–2	1–3	3–4	3–0	1–2
(France) Lille	BRN (H)	ROM (A)	PAOK (H)	RSB (A)	DZG (H)	YB (A)	CLT (A)	FRE (H)
(France) Lille	2–1	1–0	3–4	0–1	4–0	0–1	1–2	1–0
(Croatia) Dinamo Zagreb	FEN (H)	MTA (A)	MAL (A)	CLT (H)	LIL (A)	BET (H)	FCSB (H)	MID (A)
(Croatia) Dinamo Zagreb	3–1	3–1	1–1	0–3	0–4	1–3	4–1	0–2
(Spain) Real Betis	NFO (H)	LUD (A)	GNK (A)	LYO (H)	UTR (H)	DZG (A)	PAOK (A)	FEY (H)
(Spain) Real Betis	2–2	2–0	0–0	2–0	2–1	3–1	0–2	2–1
(Austria) Red Bull Salzburg	POR (H)	LYO (A)	FER (H)	GAE (H)	BOL (A)	FRE (A)	BSL (H)	AVL (A)
(Austria) Red Bull Salzburg	0–1	0–2	2–3	2–0	1–4	0–1	3–1	2–3
(England) Aston Villa	BOL (H)	FEY (A)	GAE (A)	MTA (H)	YB (H)	BSL (A)	FEN (A)	SAL (H)
(England) Aston Villa	1–0	2–0	1–2	2–0	2–1	2–1	1–0	3–2

Results by Pot 2 team
Team	Matchday							
Team	1	2	3	4	5	6	7	8
(Turkey) Fenerbahçe	DZG (A)	NIC (H)	STU (H)	PLZ (A)	FER (H)	BRN (A)	AVL (H)	FCSB (A)
(Turkey) Fenerbahçe	1–3	2–1	1–0	0–0	1–1	4–0	0–1	1–1
(Portugal) Braga	FEY (H)	CEL (A)	RSB (H)	GNK (H)	RAN (A)	NIC (A)	NFO (H)	GAE (A)
(Portugal) Braga	1–0	2–0	2–0	3–4	1–1	1–0	1–0	0–0
(Serbia) Red Star Belgrade	CEL (H)	POR (A)	BRA (A)	LIL (H)	FCSB (H)	STM (A)	MAL (A)	CLT (H)
(Serbia) Red Star Belgrade	1–1	1–2	0–2	1–0	1–0	1–0	1–0	1–1
(France) Lyon	UTR (A)	SAL (H)	BSL (H)	BET (A)	MTA (A)	GAE (H)	YB (A)	PAOK (H)
(France) Lyon	1–0	2–0	2–0	0–2	6–0	2–1	1–0	4–2
(Greece) PAOK	MTA (H)	CLT (A)	LIL (A)	YB (H)	BRN (H)	LUD (A)	BET (H)	LYO (A)
(Greece) PAOK	0–0	1–3	4–3	4–0	1–1	3–3	2–0	2–4
(Czech Republic) Viktoria Plzeň	FER (A)	MAL (H)	ROM (A)	FEN (H)	FRE (H)	PAN (A)	POR (H)	BSL (A)
(Czech Republic) Viktoria Plzeň	1–1	3–0	2–1	0–0	0–0	0–0	1–1	1–0
(Hungary) Ferencváros	PLZ (H)	GNK (A)	SAL (A)	LUD (H)	FEN (A)	RAN (H)	PAN (H)	NFO (A)
(Hungary) Ferencváros	1–1	1–0	3–2	3–1	1–1	2–1	1–1	0–4
(Scotland) Celtic	RSB (A)	BRA (H)	STM (H)	MID (A)	FEY (A)	ROM (H)	BOL (A)	UTR (H)
(Scotland) Celtic	1–1	0–2	2–1	1–3	3–1	0–3	2–2	4–2
(Israel) Maccabi Tel Aviv	PAOK (A)	DZG (H)	MID (H)	AVL (A)	LYO (H)	STU (A)	FRE (A)	BOL (H)
(Israel) Maccabi Tel Aviv	0–0	1–3	0–3	0–2	0–6	1–4	0–1	0–3

Results by Pot 3 team
Team	Matchday							
Team	1	2	3	4	5	6	7	8
(Switzerland) Young Boys	PAN (H)	FCSB (A)	LUD (H)	PAOK (A)	AVL (A)	LIL (H)	LYO (H)	STU (A)
(Switzerland) Young Boys	1–4	2–0	3–2	0–4	1–2	1–0	0–1	2–3
(Switzerland) Basel	FRE (A)	STU (H)	LYO (A)	FCSB (H)	GNK (A)	AVL (H)	SAL (A)	PLZ (H)
(Switzerland) Basel	1–2	2–0	0–2	3–1	1–2	1–2	1–3	0–1
(Denmark) Midtjylland	STM (H)	NFO (A)	MTA (A)	CEL (H)	ROM (A)	GNK (H)	BRN (A)	DZG (H)
(Denmark) Midtjylland	2–0	3–2	3–0	3–1	1–2	1–0	3–3	2–0
(Germany) SC Freiburg	BSL (H)	BOL (A)	UTR (H)	NIC (A)	PLZ (A)	SAL (H)	MTA (H)	LIL (A)
(Germany) SC Freiburg	2–1	1–1	2–0	3–1	0–0	1–0	1–0	0–1
(Bulgaria) Ludogorets Razgrad	MAL (A)	BET (H)	YB (A)	FER (A)	CLT (H)	PAOK (H)	RAN (A)	NIC (H)
(Bulgaria) Ludogorets Razgrad	2–1	0–2	2–3	1–3	3–2	3–3	0–1	1–0
(England) Nottingham Forest	BET (A)	MID (H)	POR (H)	STM (A)	MAL (H)	UTR (A)	BRA (A)	FER (H)
(England) Nottingham Forest	2–2	2–3	2–0	0–0	3–0	2–1	0–1	4–0
(Austria) Sturm Graz	MID (A)	RAN (H)	CEL (A)	NFO (H)	PAN (A)	RSB (H)	FEY (A)	BRN (H)
(Austria) Sturm Graz	0–2	2–1	1–2	0–0	1–2	0–1	0–3	1–0
(Romania) FCSB	GAE (A)	YB (H)	BOL (H)	BSL (A)	RSB (A)	FEY (H)	DZG (A)	FEN (H)
(Romania) FCSB	1–0	0–2	1–2	1–3	0–1	4–3	1–4	1–1
(France) Nice	ROM (H)	FEN (A)	CLT (A)	FRE (H)	POR (A)	BRA (H)	GAE (H)	LUD (A)
(France) Nice	1–2	1–2	1–2	1–3	0–3	0–1	3–0	0–1

Results by Pot 4 team
Team	Matchday							
Team	1	2	3	4	5	6	7	8
(Italy) Bologna	AVL (A)	FRE (H)	FCSB (A)	BRN (H)	SAL (H)	CLT (A)	CEL (H)	MTA (A)
(Italy) Bologna	0–1	1–1	2–1	0–0	4–1	2–1	2–2	3–0
(Spain) Celta Vigo	STU (A)	PAOK (H)	NIC (H)	DZG (A)	LUD (A)	BOL (H)	LIL (H)	RSB (A)
(Spain) Celta Vigo	1–2	3–1	2–1	3–0	2–3	1–2	2–1	1–1
(Germany) VfB Stuttgart	CLT (H)	BSL (A)	FEN (A)	FEY (H)	GAE (A)	MTA (H)	ROM (A)	YB (H)
(Germany) VfB Stuttgart	2–1	0–2	0–1	2–0	4–0	4–1	0–2	3–2
(Greece) Panathinaikos	YB (A)	GAE (H)	FEY (A)	MAL (A)	STM (H)	PLZ (H)	FER (A)	ROM (H)
(Greece) Panathinaikos	4–1	1–2	1–3	1–0	2–1	0–0	1–1	1–1
(Sweden) Malmö FF	LUD (H)	PLZ (A)	DZG (H)	PAN (H)	NFO (A)	POR (A)	RSB (H)	GNK (A)
(Sweden) Malmö FF	1–2	0–3	1–1	0–1	0–3	1–2	0–1	1–2
(Netherlands) Go Ahead Eagles	FCSB (H)	PAN (A)	AVL (H)	SAL (A)	STU (H)	LYO (A)	NIC (A)	BRA (H)
(Netherlands) Go Ahead Eagles	0–1	2–1	2–1	0–2	0–4	1–2	0–3	0–0
(Netherlands) Utrecht	LYO (H)	BRN (A)	FRE (A)	POR (H)	BET (A)	NFO (H)	GNK (H)	CEL (A)
(Netherlands) Utrecht	0–1	0–1	0–2	1–1	1–2	1–2	0–2	2–4
(Belgium) Genk	RAN (A)	FER (H)	BET (H)	BRA (A)	BSL (H)	MID (A)	UTR (A)	MAL (H)
(Belgium) Genk	1–0	0–1	0–0	4–3	2–1	0–1	2–0	2–1
(Norway) Brann	LIL (A)	UTR (H)	RAN (H)	BOL (A)	PAOK (A)	FEN (H)	MID (H)	STM (A)
(Norway) Brann	1–2	1–0	3–0	0–0	1–1	0–4	3–3	0–1

Source: UEFA
Scores and legend colours are listed from the perspective of the team in the "Team" column.
Legend: H = home, A = away. Green = win; Yellow = draw; Red = loss.

== Matches ==
The fixture list was announced on 30 August 2025, the day after the draw. This was to ensure no calendar clashes with teams in the Champions League and Conference League playing in the same cities.

In principle, each team did not play more than two home matches or two away matches in a row, and played one home match and one away match across both the first and last two matchdays. The matches were played on 24–25 September (exclusive week), (Note: As part of the scheduling for the 2025–26 UEFA men's club season, each competition had an "exclusive week" in the calendar, with no other competitions scheduled during this week. For the Europa League, this took place on matchday 1 (24–25 September 2025).) 2 October, 23 October, 6 November, 27 November, 11 December 2025, 22 January and 29 January 2026. All matches were played on Thursdays, except for the competition's exclusive week, which also included Wednesday fixtures. In principle, the scheduled kick-off times were 16:30, 18:45 and 21:00 CET/CEST. All fixtures on the final matchday were played simultaneously at 21:00.

Times are CET or CEST, (Note: CEST (UTC+2) for dates up to 25 October 2025 (matchdays 1–3), and CET (UTC+1) for dates thereafter (matchdays 4–8).) as listed by UEFA (local times, if different, are in parentheses).

=== Matchday 1 ===
24 September 2025
18:45

Midtjylland (Danish Football Association)	2–0	(Austrian Football Association) Sturm Graz
Christensen 7' (o.g.); Diao 88'	Report

MCH Arena, Herning
Attendance: 8,331
Referee: Orel Grinfeld (Israel)

24 September 2025
18:45 (19:45 UTC+3)

PAOK (Hellenic Football Federation)	0–0	(Israel Football Association) Maccabi Tel Aviv
	Report

Toumba Stadium, Thessaloniki
Attendance: 19,667
Referee: Sven Jablonski (Germany)

24 September 2025
21:00

Red Star Belgrade (Football Association of Serbia)	1–1	(Scottish Football Association) Celtic
Arnautović 65'	Report	Iheanacho 55'

Red Star Stadium, Belgrade
Attendance: 35,721
Referee: Radu Petrescu (Romania)

24 September 2025
21:00

Dinamo Zagreb (Croatian Football Federation)	3–1	(Turkish Football Federation) Fenerbahçe
Beljo 21', 50'; Bakrar 90+5'	Report	Szymański 25'

Stadion Maksimir, Zagreb
Attendance: 13,926
Referee: Jérôme Brisard (France)

24 September 2025
21:00

Malmö FF (Swedish Football Association)	1–2	(Bulgarian Football Union) Ludogorets Razgrad
Berg Johnsen 78'	Report	Stanić 8' (pen.); Bile 23'

Stadion, Malmö
Attendance: 11,478
Referee: Manfredas Lukjančukas (Lithuania)

24 September 2025
21:00

Nice (French Football Federation)	1–2	(Italian Football Federation) Roma
Moffi 77' (pen.)	Report	Ndicka 52'; Mancini 55'

Allianz Riviera, Nice
Attendance: 23,089
Referee: Guillermo Cuadra Fernández (Spain)

24 September 2025
21:00

Real Betis (Royal Spanish Football Federation)	2–2	(The Football Association) Nottingham Forest
Bakambu 15'; Antony 85'	Report	Igor Jesus 18', 23'

La Cartuja, Seville (Note: Real Betis played their home matches at La Cartuja, Seville, instead of their regular stadium, Benito Villamarín, Seville, due to renovation works.)
Attendance: 57,257
Referee: Sascha Stegemann (Germany)

24 September 2025
21:00 (20:00 UTC+1)

Braga (Portuguese Football Federation)	1–0	(Royal Dutch Football Association) Feyenoord
Navarro 79'	Report

Estádio Municipal, Braga
Attendance: 12,769
Referee: Nikola Dabanović (Montenegro)

24 September 2025
21:00

SC Freiburg (German Football Association)	2–1	(Swiss Football Association) Basel
Osterhage 31'; Eggestein 57'	Report	Otele 84'

Europa-Park Stadion, Freiburg im Breisgau
Attendance: 34,300
Referee: Luís Godinho (Portugal)

25 September 2025
18:45

Go Ahead Eagles (Royal Dutch Football Association)	0–1	(Romanian Football Federation) FCSB
	Report	Miculescu 13'

De Adelaarshorst, Deventer
Attendance: 9,578
Referee: Kristo Tohver (Estonia)

25 September 2025
18:45

Lille (French Football Federation)	2–1	(Norwegian Football Federation) Brann
Igamane 54'; Giroud 80'	Report	Magnússon 60'

Stade Pierre-Mauroy, Villeneuve-d'Ascq
Attendance: 17,529
Referee: Allard Lindhout (Netherlands)

25 September 2025
21:00 (20:00 UTC+1)

Aston Villa (The Football Association)	1–0	(Italian Football Federation) Bologna
McGinn 13'	Report

Villa Park, Birmingham
Attendance: 30,909
Referee: Jesús Gil Manzano (Spain)

25 September 2025
21:00

Young Boys (Swiss Football Association)	1–4	(Hellenic Football Federation) Panathinaikos
Janko 25'	Report	Świderski 10'; Zaroury 13', 19', 68'

Stadion Wankdorf, Bern
Attendance: 20,023
Referee: Ricardo de Burgos Bengoetxea (Spain)

25 September 2025
21:00

Red Bull Salzburg (Austrian Football Association)	0–1	(Portuguese Football Federation) Porto
	Report	William Gomes 90+3'

Red Bull Arena, Salzburg
Attendance: 9,993
Referee: Vasilios Fotias (Greece)

25 September 2025
21:00

Utrecht (Royal Dutch Football Association)	0–1	(French Football Federation) Lyon
	Report	Tessmann 75'

Stadion Galgenwaard, Utrecht
Attendance: 22,083
Referee: Horațiu Feșnic (Romania)

25 September 2025
21:00

Ferencváros (Hungarian Football Federation)	1–1	(Football Association of the Czech Republic) Viktoria Plzeň
Pešić 90+4'	Report	Durosinmi 16'

Ferencváros Stadion, Budapest
Attendance: 16,117
Referee: Sander van der Eijk (Netherlands)

25 September 2025
21:00 (20:00 UTC+1)

Rangers (Scottish Football Association)	0–1	(Royal Belgian Football Association) Genk
	Report	Oh 55'

Ibrox Stadium, Glasgow
Attendance: 37,898
Referee: Matej Jug (Slovenia)

25 September 2025
21:00

VfB Stuttgart (German Football Association)	2–1	(Royal Spanish Football Federation) Celta Vigo
Bouanani 51'; El Khannouss 68'	Report	Iglesias 86'

MHPArena, Stuttgart
Attendance: 58,000
Referee: Nick Walsh (Scotland)

=== Matchday 2 ===
2 October 2025
18:45

Roma (Italian Football Federation)	0–1	(French Football Federation) Lille
	Report	Haraldsson 6'

Stadio Olimpico, Rome
Attendance: 61,561
Referee: Erik Lambrechts (Belgium)

2 October 2025
18:45

Bologna (Italian Football Federation)	1–1	(German Football Association) SC Freiburg
Orsolini 29'	Report	Adamu 57' (pen.)

Stadio Renato Dall'Ara, Bologna
Attendance: 24,428
Referee: Nenad Minaković (Serbia)

2 October 2025
18:45 (17:45 UTC+1)

Celtic (Scottish Football Association)	0–2	(Portuguese Football Federation) Braga
	Report	Horta 20'; Martínez 85'

Celtic Park, Glasgow
Attendance: 46,232
Referee: Tobias Stieler (Germany)

2 October 2025
18:45

Viktoria Plzeň (Football Association of the Czech Republic)	3–0	(Swedish Football Association) Malmö FF
Vydra 34'; Durosinmi 44'; Spáčil 53'	Report

Doosan Arena, Plzeň
Attendance: 10,811
Referee: Enea Jorgji (Albania)

2 October 2025
18:45 (19:45 UTC+3)

Fenerbahçe (Turkish Football Federation)	2–1	(French Football Federation) Nice
Aktürkoğlu 3', 25'	Report	Kevin Carlos 37' (pen.)

Şükrü Saracoğlu Stadium, Istanbul
Attendance: 35,523
Referee: Srđan Jovanović (Serbia)

2 October 2025
18:45 (19:45 UTC+3)

FCSB (Romanian Football Federation)	0–2	(Swiss Football Association) Young Boys
	Report	Monteiro 11', 36'

Arena Națională, Bucharest
Attendance: 25,056
Referee: Mohammed Al-Hakim (Sweden)

2 October 2025
18:45 (19:45 UTC+3)

Panathinaikos (Hellenic Football Federation)	1–2	(Royal Dutch Football Association) Go Ahead Eagles
Świderski 55'	Report	Smit 75', 82'

Olympic Stadium, Athens
Attendance: 18,808
Referee: Sebastian Gishamer (Austria)

2 October 2025
18:45 (19:45 UTC+3)

Ludogorets Razgrad (Bulgarian Football Union)	0–2	(Royal Spanish Football Federation) Real Betis
	Report	Lo Celso 31'; Son 53' (o.g.)

Huvepharma Arena, Razgrad
Attendance: 5,844
Referee: Julian Weinberger (Austria)

2 October 2025
18:45

Brann (Norwegian Football Federation)	1–0	(Royal Dutch Football Association) Utrecht
Magnússon 41'	Report

Brann Stadion, Bergen
Attendance: 15,366
Referee: Aliyar Aghayev (Azerbaijan)

2 October 2025
21:00

Basel (Swiss Football Association)	2–0	(German Football Association) VfB Stuttgart
Ajeti 3'; Shaqiri 84'	Report

St. Jakob-Park, Basel
Attendance: 33,650
Referee: Davide Massa (Italy)

2 October 2025
21:00 (20:00 UTC+1)

Porto (Portuguese Football Federation)	2–1	(Football Association of Serbia) Red Star Belgrade
William Gomes 8' (pen.); Mora 89'	Report	Kostov 32'

Estádio do Dragão, Porto
Attendance: 42,812
Referee: Harm Osmers (Germany)

2 October 2025
21:00

Feyenoord (Royal Dutch Football Association)	0–2	(The Football Association) Aston Villa
	Report	Buendía 61'; McGinn 79'

De Kuip, Rotterdam
Attendance: 42,634
Referee: Rade Obrenović (Slovenia)

2 October 2025
21:00

Genk (Royal Belgian Football Association)	0–1	(Hungarian Football Federation) Ferencváros
	Report	Varga 44'

Cegeka Arena, Genk
Attendance: 10,630
Referee: Anastasios Sidiropoulos (Greece)

2 October 2025
21:00

Maccabi Tel Aviv (Israel Football Association)	1–3	(Croatian Football Federation) Dinamo Zagreb
Abu Farchi 14'	Report	Lisica 16'; Ljubičić 19', 72'

TSC Arena, Bačka Topola, Serbia (Note: Due to the Gaza war, Israeli teams were required to play their home matches at neutral venues until further notice. Therefore, Maccabi Tel Aviv played their home matches at TSC Arena, Bačka Topola, Serbia, instead of their regular stadium, Bloomfield Stadium, Tel Aviv.)
Attendance: 255
Referee: António Nobre (Portugal)

2 October 2025
21:00 (20:00 UTC+1)

Nottingham Forest (The Football Association)	2–3	(Danish Football Association) Midtjylland
Ndoye 22'; Wood 90+3' (pen.)	Report	Diao 18'; Bech 24'; Byskov 88'

City Ground, West Bridgford
Attendance: 29,323
Referee: Willy Delajod (France)

2 October 2025
21:00

Lyon (French Football Federation)	2–0	(Austrian Football Association) Red Bull Salzburg
Satriano 11'; Kluivert 57'	Report

Parc Olympique Lyonnais, Décines-Charpieu
Attendance: 31,767
Referee: Andris Treimanis (Latvia)

2 October 2025
21:00

Celta Vigo (Royal Spanish Football Federation)	3–1	(Hellenic Football Federation) PAOK
Aspas 45+2'; Iglesias 53'; Swedberg 70'	Report	Giakoumakis 37'

Balaídos, Vigo
Attendance: 20,849
Referee: Igor Pajač (Croatia)

2 October 2025
21:00

Sturm Graz (Austrian Football Association)	2–1	(Scottish Football Association) Rangers
Horvat 7'; Kiteishvili 35'	Report	Gassama 49'

Liebenauer Stadium, Graz
Attendance: 15,532
Referee: Halil Umut Meler (Turkey)

=== Matchday 3 ===
23 October 2025
18:45

Red Bull Salzburg (Austrian Football Association)	2–3	(Hungarian Football Federation) Ferencváros
Baidoo 13'; Vertessen 72'	Report	Varga 50'; Zachariassen 56'; Yusuf 58'

Red Bull Arena, Salzburg
Attendance: 8,342
Referee: Goga Kikacheishvili (Georgia)

23 October 2025
18:45 (19:45 UTC+3)

Fenerbahçe (Turkish Football Federation)	1–0	(German Football Association) VfB Stuttgart
Aktürkoğlu 34' (pen.)	Report

Şükrü Saracoğlu Stadium, Istanbul
Attendance: 38,891
Referee: Jakob Kehlet (Denmark)

23 October 2025
18:45 (19:45 UTC+3)

FCSB (Romanian Football Federation)	1–2	(Italian Football Federation) Bologna
Bîrligea 54'	Report	Odgaard 9'; Dallinga 12'

Arena Națională, Bucharest
Attendance: 27,643
Referee: Andris Treimanis (Latvia)

23 October 2025
18:45

Go Ahead Eagles (Royal Dutch Football Association)	2–1	(The Football Association) Aston Villa
Suray 42'; Deijl 61'	Report	Guessand 4'

De Adelaarshorst, Deventer
Attendance: 9,598
Referee: Filip Glova (Slovakia)

23 October 2025
18:45

Genk (Royal Belgian Football Association)	0–0	(Royal Spanish Football Federation) Real Betis
	Report

Cegeka Arena, Genk
Attendance: 16,780
Referee: Elchin Masiyev (Azerbaijan)

23 October 2025
18:45

Lyon (French Football Federation)	2–0	(Swiss Football Association) Basel
Tolisso 3'; Moreira 90'	Report

Parc Olympique Lyonnais, Décines-Charpieu
Attendance: 35,860
Referee: Manfredas Lukjančukas (Lithuania)

23 October 2025
18:45 (17:45 UTC+1)

Braga (Portuguese Football Federation)	2–0	(Football Association of Serbia) Red Star Belgrade
Navarro 22'; Dorgeles 72'	Report

Estádio Municipal, Braga
Attendance: 10,056
Referee: Espen Eskås (Norway)

23 October 2025
18:45

Brann (Norwegian Football Federation)	3–0	(Scottish Football Association) Rangers
Kornvig 40'; Sørensen 55'; Holm 79'	Report

Brann Stadion, Bergen
Attendance: 15,800
Referee: Vasilios Fotias (Greece)

23 October 2025
21:00 (Note: The Feyenoord v Panathinaikos match was originally scheduled for 18:45. The day prior to the match, the kick-off was initially moved forward to 16:30 due to adverse weather conditions. However, on the day of the match, the kick-off time was pushed back to 21:00 due to a change in the weather forecast.)

Feyenoord (Royal Dutch Football Association)	3–1	(Hellenic Football Federation) Panathinaikos
Read 45+3'; Hadj Moussa 55'; Larin 90'	Report	Świderski 18'

De Kuip, Rotterdam
Attendance: 37,169
Referee: Harm Osmers (Germany)

23 October 2025
21:00

Roma (Italian Football Federation)	1–2	(Football Association of the Czech Republic) Viktoria Plzeň
Dybala 54' (pen.)	Report	Adu 20'; Souaré 22'

Stadio Olimpico, Rome
Attendance: 52,263
Referee: Halil Umut Meler (Turkey)

23 October 2025
21:00

Young Boys (Swiss Football Association)	3–2	(Bulgarian Football Union) Ludogorets Razgrad
Raveloson 45'; Fassnacht 53'; Bedia 63' (pen.)	Report	Stanić 26'; Yordanov 90+2'

Stadion Wankdorf, Bern
Attendance: 17,526
Referee: Mohammad Al-Emara (Finland)

23 October 2025
21:00 (20:00 UTC+1)

Celtic (Scottish Football Association)	2–1	(Austrian Football Association) Sturm Graz
Scales 61'; Nygren 64'	Report	Horvat 15'

Celtic Park, Glasgow
Attendance: 48,278
Referee: Juan Martínez Munuera (Spain)

23 October 2025
21:00

Lille (French Football Federation)	3–4	(Hellenic Football Federation) PAOK
André 57'; Igamane 68', 78'	Report	Meïté 18'; Živković 23', 74'; Konstantelias 42'

Stade Pierre-Mauroy, Villeneuve-d'Ascq
Attendance: 23,666
Referee: Nikola Dabanović (Montenegro)

23 October 2025
21:00

Maccabi Tel Aviv (Israel Football Association)	0–3	(Danish Football Association) Midtjylland
	Report	Djú 44', 84'; Billing 71'

TSC Arena, Bačka Topola, Serbia
Attendance: 487
Referee: Georgi Kabakov (Bulgaria)

23 October 2025
21:00

Malmö FF (Swedish Football Association)	1–1	(Croatian Football Federation) Dinamo Zagreb
Lewicki 45+1'	Report	Varela 90+6'

Stadion, Malmö
Attendance: 14,212
Referee: Willy Delajod (France)

23 October 2025
21:00 (20:00 UTC+1)

Nottingham Forest (The Football Association)	2–0	(Portuguese Football Federation) Porto
Gibbs-White 19' (pen.); Igor Jesus 77' (pen.)	Report

City Ground, West Bridgford
Attendance: 29,195
Referee: Radu Petrescu (Romania)

23 October 2025
21:00

Celta Vigo (Royal Spanish Football Federation)	2–1	(French Football Federation) Nice
Aspas 2'; Oppong 75' (o.g.)	Report	Cho 16'

Balaídos, Vigo
Attendance: 20,631
Referee: Sander van der Eijk (Netherlands)

23 October 2025
21:00

SC Freiburg (German Football Association)	2–0	(Royal Dutch Football Association) Utrecht
Suzuki 20'; Grifo 45'	Report

Europa-Park Stadion, Freiburg im Breisgau
Attendance: 34,195
Referee: Rohit Saggi (Norway)

=== Matchday 4 ===
6 November 2025
18:45

Red Bull Salzburg (Austrian Football Association)	2–0	(Royal Dutch Football Association) Go Ahead Eagles
Vertessen 59'; Terzić 80'	Report

Red Bull Arena, Salzburg
Attendance: 10,852
Referee: Giorgi Kruashvili (Georgia)

6 November 2025
18:45

Basel (Swiss Football Association)	3–1	(Romanian Football Federation) FCSB
Shaqiri 19' (pen.), 73'; Salah 88'	Report	Olaru 57'

St. Jakob-Park, Basel
Attendance: 21,925
Referee: Juxhin Xhaja (Albania)

6 November 2025
18:45

Midtjylland (Danish Football Association)	3–1	(Scottish Football Association) Celtic
Erlić 33'; Gogorza 35'; Djú 41'	Report	Hatate 81' (pen.)

MCH Arena, Herning
Attendance: 10,387
Referee: Nenad Minaković (Serbia)

6 November 2025
18:45

Utrecht (Royal Dutch Football Association)	1–1	(Portuguese Football Federation) Porto
Rodríguez 48'	Report	Sainz 66'

Stadion Galgenwaard, Utrecht
Attendance: 23,053
Referee: John Beaton (Scotland)

6 November 2025
18:45

Red Star Belgrade (Football Association of Serbia)	1–0	(French Football Federation) Lille
Arnautović 85' (pen.)	Report

Red Star Stadium, Belgrade
Attendance: 32,711
Referee: John Brooks (England)

6 November 2025
18:45

Dinamo Zagreb (Croatian Football Federation)	0–3	(Royal Spanish Football Federation) Celta Vigo
	Report	Durán 4', 44'; S. Domínguez 28' (o.g.)

Stadion Maksimir, Zagreb
Attendance: 19,431
Referee: Anastasios Papapetrou (Greece)

6 November 2025
18:45

Malmö FF (Swedish Football Association)	0–1	(Hellenic Football Federation) Panathinaikos
	Report	Đuričić 85'

Stadion, Malmö
Attendance: 12,531
Referee: Nick Walsh (Scotland)

6 November 2025
18:45

Nice (French Football Federation)	1–3	(German Football Association) SC Freiburg
Kevin Carlos 25'	Report	Manzambi 29'; Grifo 39' (pen.); Scherhant 42'

Allianz Riviera, Nice
Attendance: 15,274
Referee: Anastasios Sidiropoulos (Greece)

6 November 2025
18:45

Sturm Graz (Austrian Football Association)	0–0	(The Football Association) Nottingham Forest
	Report

Liebenauer Stadium, Graz
Attendance: 16,192
Referee: Mykola Balakin (Ukraine)

6 November 2025
21:00 (20:00 UTC+0)

Aston Villa (The Football Association)	2–0	(Israel Football Association) Maccabi Tel Aviv
Maatsen 45+1'; Malen 59' (pen.)	Report

Villa Park, Birmingham
Attendance: 29,429
Referee: Julian Weinberger (Austria)

6 November 2025
21:00

Bologna (Italian Football Federation)	0–0	(Norwegian Football Federation) Brann
	Report

Stadio Renato Dall'Ara, Bologna
Attendance: 22,508
Referee: Daniel Schlager (Germany)

6 November 2025
21:00

Viktoria Plzeň (Football Association of the Czech Republic)	0–0	(Turkish Football Federation) Fenerbahçe
	Report

Doosan Arena, Plzeň
Attendance: 11,090
Referee: Allard Lindhout (Netherlands)

6 November 2025
21:00

Ferencváros (Hungarian Football Federation)	3–1	(Bulgarian Football Union) Ludogorets Razgrad
Kanichowsky 32'; Cadu 53'; Joseph 87'	Report	Son 78'

Ferencváros Stadion, Budapest
Attendance: 18,789
Referee: Mohammed Al-Hakim (Sweden)

6 November 2025
21:00 (22:00 UTC+2)

PAOK (Hellenic Football Federation)	4–0	(Swiss Football Association) Young Boys
Bianco 54'; Giakoumakis 67'; Konstantelias 72'; Baba 76'	Report

Toumba Stadium, Thessaloniki
Attendance: 21,608
Referee: Srđan Jovanović (Serbia)

6 November 2025
21:00 (20:00 UTC+0)

Rangers (Scottish Football Association)	0–2	(Italian Football Federation) Roma
	Report	Soulé 13'; Pellegrini 36'

Ibrox Stadium, Glasgow
Attendance: 41,847
Referee: Morten Krogh (Denmark)

6 November 2025
21:00

Real Betis (Royal Spanish Football Federation)	2–0	(French Football Federation) Lyon
Ezzalzouli 30'; Antony 35'	Report

La Cartuja, Seville
Attendance: 55,836
Referee: Matej Jug (Slovenia)

6 November 2025
21:00 (20:00 UTC+0)

Braga (Portuguese Football Federation)	3–4	(Royal Belgian Football Association) Genk
Zalazar 30', 71'; Navarro 86'	Report	Heymans 45+2'; Sor 48'; Oh Hyeon-gyu 59'; Medina 72'

Estádio Municipal, Braga
Attendance: 11,265
Referee: Balázs Berke (Hungary)

6 November 2025
21:00

VfB Stuttgart (German Football Association)	2–0	(Royal Dutch Football Association) Feyenoord
El Khannouss 84'; Undav 90+1'	Report

MHPArena, Stuttgart
Attendance: 60,000
Referee: Horațiu Feșnic (Romania)

=== Matchday 5 ===
27 November 2025
18:45

Roma (Italian Football Federation)	2–1	(Danish Football Association) Midtjylland
El Aynaoui 7'; El Shaarawy 83'	Report	Paulinho 86'

Stadio Olimpico, Rome
Attendance: 61,653
Referee: Nikola Dabanović (Montenegro)

27 November 2025
18:45 (17:45 UTC+0)

Aston Villa (The Football Association)	2–1	(Swiss Football Association) Young Boys
Malen 27', 42'	Report	Monteiro 90'

Villa Park, Birmingham
Attendance: 32,158
Referee: Georgi Kabakov (Bulgaria)

27 November 2025
18:45 (17:45 UTC+0)

Porto (Portuguese Football Federation)	3–0	(French Football Federation) Nice
Veiga 1', 33'; Aghehowa 61' (pen.)	Report

Estádio do Dragão, Porto
Attendance: 37,254
Referee: Matej Jug (Slovenia)

27 November 2025
18:45

Viktoria Plzeň (Football Association of the Czech Republic)	0–0	(German Football Association) SC Freiburg
	Report

Doosan Arena, Plzeň
Attendance: 10,182
Referee: Morten Krogh (Denmark)

27 November 2025
18:45 (20:45 UTC+3)

Fenerbahçe (Turkish Football Federation)	1–1	(Hungarian Football Federation) Ferencváros
Talisca 69'	Report	Varga 66'

Şükrü Saracoğlu Stadium, Istanbul
Attendance: 37,898
Referee: Ricardo de Burgos Bengoetxea (Spain)

27 November 2025
18:45

Feyenoord (Royal Dutch Football Association)	1–3	(Scottish Football Association) Celtic
Ueda 11'	Report	Yang Hyun-jun 31'; Hatate 43'; Nygren 82'

De Kuip, Rotterdam
Attendance: 31,582
Referee: Sebastian Gishamer (Austria)

27 November 2025
18:45

Lille (French Football Federation)	4–0	(Croatian Football Federation) Dinamo Zagreb
Correia 21'; Mukau 36'; Igamane 69'; André 86'	Report

Stade Pierre-Mauroy, Villeneuve-d'Ascq
Attendance: 22,146
Referee: John Beaton (Scotland)

27 November 2025
18:45 (19:45 UTC+2)

PAOK (Hellenic Football Federation)	1–1	(Norwegian Football Federation) Brann
Ivanušec 64'	Report	Kornvig 89'

Toumba Stadium, Thessaloniki
Attendance: 16,005
Referee: Sascha Stegemann (Germany)

27 November 2025
18:45 (19:45 UTC+2)

Ludogorets Razgrad (Bulgarian Football Union)	3–2	(Royal Spanish Football Federation) Celta Vigo
Stanić 11' (pen.), 49', 62' (pen.)	Report	Durán 70'; El-Abdellaoui 90+6'

Huvepharma Arena, Razgrad
Attendance: 4,779
Referee: Balázs Berke (Hungary)

27 November 2025
21:00

Bologna (Italian Football Federation)	4–1	(Austrian Football Association) Red Bull Salzburg
Odgaard 26'; Dallinga 51'; Bernardeschi 53'; Orsolini 86'	Report	Vertessen 33'

Stadio Renato Dall'Ara, Bologna
Attendance: 21,025
Referee: Igor Pajač (Croatia)

27 November 2025
21:00

Red Star Belgrade (Football Association of Serbia)	1–0	(Romanian Football Federation) FCSB
Duarte 50'	Report

Red Star Stadium, Belgrade
Attendance: 26,054
Referee: Jérôme Brisard (France)

27 November 2025
21:00

Go Ahead Eagles (Royal Dutch Football Association)	0–4	(German Football Association) VfB Stuttgart
	Report	Leweling 20', 35'; El Khannouss 59'; Bouanani 90+3'

De Adelaarshorst, Deventer
Attendance: 9,448
Referee: Mohammed Al-Hakim (Sweden)

27 November 2025
21:00

Genk (Royal Belgian Football Association)	2–1	(Swiss Football Association) Basel
Oh Hyeon-gyu 14'; Karetsas 45+2'	Report	Otele 57'

Cegeka Arena, Genk
Attendance: 13,104
Referee: Orel Grinfeld (Israel)

27 November 2025
21:00

Maccabi Tel Aviv (Israel Football Association)	0–6	(French Football Federation) Lyon
	Report	Abner 4'; Tolisso 25', 51', 53'; Niakhaté 35' (pen.); Karabec 62'

TSC Arena, Bačka Topola, Serbia
Attendance: 320
Referee: Kristo Tohver (Estonia)

27 November 2025
21:00 (20:00 UTC+0)

Nottingham Forest (The Football Association)	3–0	(Swedish Football Association) Malmö FF
Yates 27'; Kalimuendo 44'; Milenković 59'	Report

City Ground, West Bridgford
Attendance: 28,941
Referee: Harm Osmers (Germany)

27 November 2025
21:00 (22:00 UTC+2)

Panathinaikos (Hellenic Football Federation)	2–1	(Austrian Football Association) Sturm Graz
Świderski 18'; Calabria 74'	Report	Kiteishvili 34'

Olympic Stadium, Athens
Attendance: 21,013
Referee: Simone Sozza (Italy)

27 November 2025
21:00 (20:00 UTC+0)

Rangers (Scottish Football Association)	1–1	(Portuguese Football Federation) Braga
Tavernier 45+3' (pen.)	Report	Martínez 69'

Ibrox Stadium, Glasgow
Attendance: 38,014
Referee: Allard Lindhout (Netherlands)

27 November 2025
21:00

Real Betis (Royal Spanish Football Federation)	2–1	(Royal Dutch Football Association) Utrecht
Hernández 42'; Ezzalzouli 50'	Report	Rodríguez 55'

La Cartuja, Seville
Attendance: 46,170
Referee: Nenad Minaković (Serbia)

=== Matchday 6 ===
11 December 2025
18:45

Young Boys (Swiss Football Association)	1–0	(French Football Federation) Lille
Maleš 61'	Report

Stadion Wankdorf, Bern
Attendance: 20,168
Referee: Sander van der Eijk (Netherlands)

11 December 2025
18:45

Midtjylland (Danish Football Association)	1–0	(Royal Belgian Football Association) Genk
Cho Gue-sung 17'	Report

MCH Arena, Herning
Attendance: 9,820
Referee: Vasilios Fotias (Greece)

11 December 2025
18:45

Utrecht (Royal Dutch Football Association)	1–2	(The Football Association) Nottingham Forest
Van der Hoorn 73'	Report	Kalimuendo 52'; Igor Jesus 88'

Stadion Galgenwaard, Utrecht
Attendance: 22,865
Referee: Irfan Peljto (Bosnia and Herzegovina)

11 December 2025
18:45

Ferencváros (Hungarian Football Federation)	2–1	(Scottish Football Association) Rangers
Ötvös 45+5'; Varga 72'	Report	Miovski 27'

Ferencváros Stadion, Budapest
Attendance: 19,567
Referee: Anastasios Papapetrou (Greece)

11 December 2025
18:45

Dinamo Zagreb (Croatian Football Federation)	1–3	(Royal Spanish Football Federation) Real Betis
Galešić 89'	Report	Domínguez 31' (o.g.); Riquelme 34'; Antony 38'

Stadion Maksimir, Zagreb
Attendance: 11,437
Referee: Goga Kikacheishvili (Georgia)

11 December 2025
18:45

Nice (French Football Federation)	0–1	(Portuguese Football Federation) Braga
	Report	Víctor 28'

Allianz Riviera, Nice
Attendance: 12,169
Referee: Giorgi Kruashvili (Georgia)

11 December 2025
18:45 (19:45 UTC+2)

Ludogorets Razgrad (Bulgarian Football Union)	3–3	(Hellenic Football Federation) PAOK
Stanić 33'; Verdon 70'; Chochev 77'	Report	Despodov 39'; Vogliacco 48'; Mythou 90'

Huvepharma Arena, Razgrad
Attendance: 6,433
Referee: Horațiu Feșnic (Romania)

11 December 2025
18:45

Sturm Graz (Austrian Football Association)	0–1	(Football Association of Serbia) Red Star Belgrade
	Report	Ivanić 55'

Liebenauer Stadium, Graz
Attendance: 16,077
Referee: Damian Sylwestrzak (Poland)

11 December 2025
18:45

VfB Stuttgart (German Football Association)	4–1	(Israel Football Association) Maccabi Tel Aviv
Assignon 24'; Tomás 37'; Mittelstädt 50' (pen.); Vagnoman 90+4'	Report	Revivo 52'

MHPArena, Stuttgart
Attendance: 57,000
Referee: Marian Barbu (Romania)

11 December 2025
21:00 (20:00 UTC+0)

Celtic (Scottish Football Association)	0–3	(Italian Football Federation) Roma
	Report	Scales 6' (o.g.); Ferguson 36', 45+1'

Celtic Park, Glasgow
Attendance: 56,188
Referee: István Kovács (Romania)

11 December 2025
21:00 (20:00 UTC+0)

Porto (Portuguese Football Federation)	2–1	(Swedish Football Association) Malmö FF
Aghehowa 30', 36'	Report	Moura 90+5' (o.g.)

Estádio do Dragão, Porto
Attendance: 33,364
Referee: Rohit Saggi (Norway)

11 December 2025
21:00

Basel (Swiss Football Association)	1–2	(The Football Association) Aston Villa
Daniliuc 34'	Report	Guessand 12'; Tielemans 53'

St. Jakob-Park, Basel
Attendance: 27,509
Referee: Halil Umut Meler (Turkey)

11 December 2025
21:00 (22:00 UTC+2)

FCSB (Romanian Football Federation)	4–3	(Royal Dutch Football Association) Feyenoord
Ngezana 11'; Toma 54'; Thiam 87'; Tănase 90+5'	Report	Tengstedt 41'; Timber 44'; Sauer 51'

Arena Națională, Bucharest
Attendance: 22,857
Referee: Mykola Balakin (Ukraine)

11 December 2025
21:00

Lyon (French Football Federation)	2–1	(Royal Dutch Football Association) Go Ahead Eagles
Moreira 3'; Šulc 11'	Report	Smit 6'

Parc Olympique Lyonnais, Décines-Charpieu
Attendance: 26,403
Referee: Juxhin Xhaja (Albania)

11 December 2025
21:00 (22:00 UTC+2)

Panathinaikos (Hellenic Football Federation)	0–0	(Football Association of the Czech Republic) Viktoria Plzeň
	Report

Olympic Stadium, Athens
Attendance: 17,335
Referee: António Nobre (Portugal)

11 December 2025
21:00

Celta Vigo (Royal Spanish Football Federation)	1–2	(Italian Football Federation) Bologna
Zaragoza 17'	Report	Bernardeschi 66' (pen.), 74'

Balaídos, Vigo
Attendance: 20,302
Referee: Radu Petrescu (Romania)

11 December 2025
21:00

SC Freiburg (German Football Association)	1–0	(Austrian Football Association) Red Bull Salzburg
Lienhart 50'	Report

Europa-Park Stadion, Freiburg im Breisgau
Attendance: 31,016
Referee: Elchin Masiyev (Azerbaijan)

11 December 2025
21:00

Brann (Norwegian Football Federation)	0–4	(Turkish Football Federation) Fenerbahçe
	Report	Aktürkoğlu 5'; Talisca 36', 44', 65'

Brann Stadion, Bergen
Attendance: 15,620
Referee: Willy Delajod (France)

=== Matchday 7 ===
22 January 2026
18:45

Bologna (Italian Football Federation)	2–2	(Scottish Football Association) Celtic
Dallinga 58'; Rowe 72'	Report	Hatate 6'; Trusty 40'

Stadio Renato Dall'Ara, Bologna
Attendance: 23,791
Referee: Vasilios Fotias (Greece)

22 January 2026
18:45

Young Boys (Swiss Football Association)	0–1	(French Football Federation) Lyon
	Report	Maitland-Niles 45+1'

Stadion Wankdorf, Bern
Attendance: 22,746
Referee: Aliyar Aghayev (Azerbaijan)

22 January 2026
18:45

Viktoria Plzeň (Football Association of the Czech Republic)	1–1	(Portuguese Football Federation) Porto
Červ 6'	Report	Gül 90'

Doosan Arena, Plzeň
Attendance: 11,108
Referee: Andris Treimanis (Latvia)

22 January 2026
18:45 (20:45 UTC+3)

Fenerbahçe (Turkish Football Federation)	0–1	(The Football Association) Aston Villa
	Report	Sancho 25'

Şükrü Saracoğlu Stadium, Istanbul
Attendance: 41,414
Referee: Luís Godinho (Portugal)

22 January 2026
18:45

Feyenoord (Royal Dutch Football Association)	3–0	(Austrian Football Association) Sturm Graz
Watanabe 5'; Hadj Moussa 68'; Borges 90'	Report

De Kuip, Rotterdam
Attendance: 32,858
Referee: Halil Umut Meler (Turkey)

22 January 2026
18:45

Malmö FF (Swedish Football Association)	0–1	(Football Association of Serbia) Red Star Belgrade
	Report	Kostov 16'

Stadion, Malmö
Attendance: 16,852
Referee: Sascha Stegemann (Germany)

22 January 2026
18:45 (19:45 UTC+2)

PAOK (Hellenic Football Federation)	2–0	(Royal Spanish Football Federation) Real Betis
Živković 67'; Giakoumakis 86' (pen.)	Report

Toumba Stadium, Thessaloniki
Attendance: 22,221
Referee: Simone Sozza (Italy)

22 January 2026
18:45

SC Freiburg (German Football Association)	1–0	(Israel Football Association) Maccabi Tel Aviv
Matanović 82'	Report

Europa-Park Stadion, Freiburg im Breisgau
Attendance: 17,956
Referee: Mohammed Al-Hakim (Sweden)

22 January 2026
18:45

Brann (Norwegian Football Federation)	3–3	(Danish Football Association) Midtjylland
Holm 19'; Kornvig 68' (pen.); Soltvedt 90+10' (pen.)	Report	Erlić 4', 70'; Júnior Brumado 31'

Brann Stadion, Bergen
Attendance: 15,385
Referee: Georgi Kabakov (Bulgaria)

22 January 2026
21:00

Roma (Italian Football Federation)	2–0	(German Football Association) VfB Stuttgart
Pisilli 40', 90+3'	Report

Stadio Olimpico, Rome
Attendance: 65,183
Referee: John Brooks (England)

22 January 2026
21:00

Red Bull Salzburg (Austrian Football Association)	3–1	(Swiss Football Association) Basel
Alajbegović 4', 12'; Krätzig 35'	Report	Agbonifo 56'

Red Bull Arena, Salzburg
Attendance: 6,741
Referee: Anastasios Papapetrou (Greece)

22 January 2026
21:00

Ferencváros (Hungarian Football Federation)	1–1	(Hellenic Football Federation) Panathinaikos
Yusuf 62' (pen.)	Report	Zaroury 86'

Ferencváros Stadion, Budapest
Attendance: 17,879
Referee: Mykola Balakin (Ukraine)

22 January 2026
21:00

Dinamo Zagreb (Croatian Football Federation)	4–1	(Romanian Football Federation) FCSB
Bakrar 7'; Beljo 11', 71'; Kulenović 90+3'	Report	Bîrligea 42'

Stadion Maksimir, Zagreb
Attendance: 9,040
Referee: Sander van der Eijk (Netherlands)

22 January 2026
21:00

Nice (French Football Federation)	3–1	(Royal Dutch Football Association) Go Ahead Eagles
Vanhoutte 10'; Gouveia 41', 59'	Report	Stokkers 68'

Allianz Riviera, Nice
Attendance: 13,037
Referee: Oleksiy Derevinskyi (Ukraine)

22 January 2026
21:00 (20:00 UTC+0)

Rangers (Scottish Football Association)	1–0	(Bulgarian Football Union) Ludogorets Razgrad
Diomande 33'	Report

Ibrox Stadium, Glasgow
Attendance: 37,105
Referee: Manfredas Lukjančukas (Lithuania)

22 January 2026
21:00

Celta Vigo (Royal Spanish Football Federation)	2–1	(French Football Federation) Lille
Swedberg 1'; Starfelt 69'	Report	Giroud 86'

Balaídos, Vigo
Attendance: 20,015
Referee: Harm Osmers (Germany)

22 January 2026
21:00 (20:00 UTC+0)

Braga (Portuguese Football Federation)	1–0	(The Football Association) Nottingham Forest
Yates 54' (o.g.)	Report

Estádio Municipal, Braga
Attendance: 12,377
Referee: Igor Pajač (Croatia)

22 January 2026
21:50 (Note: The Utrecht v Genk match, originally scheduled for 21:00, was delayed to 21:50 for safety reasons.)

Utrecht (Royal Dutch Football Association)	0–2	(Royal Belgian Football Association) Genk
	Report	El Ouahdi 54'; Heymans 83' (pen.)

Stadion Galgenwaard, Utrecht
Attendance: 21,416
Referee: Rob Hennessy (Republic of Ireland)

=== Matchday 8 ===
29 January 2026
21:00 (20:00 UTC+0)

Aston Villa (The Football Association)	3–2	(Austrian Football Association) Red Bull Salzburg
Rogers 64'; Mings 76'; Jimoh-Aloba 87'	Report	Lindelöf 33' (o.g.); Yeo 49'

Villa Park, Birmingham
Attendance: 37,457
Referee: Rohit Saggi (Norway)

29 January 2026
21:00 (20:00 UTC+0)

Celtic (Scottish Football Association)	4–2	(Royal Dutch Football Association) Utrecht
Nygren 6'; Viergever 10' (o.g.); Engels 19' (pen.); Trusty 66'	Report	De Wit 44'; Blake 62'

Celtic Park, Glasgow
Attendance: 55,559
Referee: Mohammad Al-Emara (Finland)

29 January 2026
21:00 (20:00 UTC+0)

Porto (Portuguese Football Federation)	3–1	(Scottish Football Association) Rangers
Mora 27'; Moura 36'; Fernandez 41' (o.g.)	Report	Gassama 6'

Estádio do Dragão, Porto
Attendance: 38,213
Referee: Jasper Vergoote (Belgium)

29 January 2026
21:00

Basel (Swiss Football Association)	0–1	(Football Association of the Czech Republic) Viktoria Plzeň
	Report	Panoš 39'

St. Jakob-Park, Basel
Attendance: 20,454
Referee: Giorgi Kruashvili (Georgia)

29 January 2026
21:00

Midtjylland (Danish Football Association)	2–0	(Croatian Football Federation) Dinamo Zagreb
Şimşir 49'; Bak 74'	Report

MCH Arena, Herning
Attendance: 8,297
Referee: Elchin Masiyev (Azerbaijan)

29 January 2026
21:00

Red Star Belgrade (Football Association of Serbia)	1–1	(Royal Spanish Football Federation) Celta Vigo
Duarte 89'	Report	López 88'

Red Star Stadium, Belgrade
Attendance: 39,116
Referee: Andrea Colombo (Italy)

29 January 2026
21:00 (22:00 UTC+2)

FCSB (Romanian Football Federation)	1–1	(Turkish Football Federation) Fenerbahçe
Cisotti 71'	Report	Yüksek 19'

Arena Națională, Bucharest
Attendance: 27,751
Referee: Nenad Minaković (Serbia)

29 January 2026
21:00

Go Ahead Eagles (Royal Dutch Football Association)	0–0	(Portuguese Football Federation) Braga
	Report

De Adelaarshorst, Deventer
Attendance: 9,480
Referee: Willy Delajod (France)

29 January 2026
21:00

Genk (Royal Belgian Football Association)	2–1	(Swedish Football Association) Malmö FF
Heymans 45' (pen.); Karetsas 82'	Report	Ali 4'

Cegeka Arena, Genk
Attendance: 11,450
Referee: Horațiu Feșnic (Romania)

29 January 2026
21:00

Lille (French Football Federation)	1–0	(German Football Association) SC Freiburg
Giroud 90+2' (pen.)	Report

Stade Pierre-Mauroy, Villeneuve-d'Ascq
Attendance: 22,583
Referee: Damian Sylwestrzak (Poland)

29 January 2026
21:00

Maccabi Tel Aviv (Israel Football Association)	0–3	(Italian Football Federation) Bologna
	Report	Rowe 35'; Orsolini 47'; Pobega 90+4'

TSC Arena, Bačka Topola, Serbia
Attendance: 81
Referee: Goga Kikacheishvili (Georgia)

29 January 2026
21:00 (20:00 UTC+0)

Nottingham Forest (The Football Association)	4–0	(Hungarian Football Federation) Ferencváros
Ötvös 17' (o.g.); Igor Jesus 21', 55'; McAtee 90' (pen.)	Report

City Ground, West Bridgford
Attendance: 26,304
Referee: Sebastian Gishamer (Austria)

29 January 2026
21:00

Lyon (French Football Federation)	4–2	(Hellenic Football Federation) PAOK
Himbert 34'; Merah 55'; Karabec 88'; Gomes Rodríguez 90+3'	Report	Giakoumakis 20'; Meïté 66'

Parc Olympique Lyonnais, Décines-Charpieu
Attendance: 26,149
Referee: Ricardo de Burgos Bengoetxea (Spain)

29 January 2026
21:00 (22:00 UTC+2)

Panathinaikos (Hellenic Football Federation)	1–1	(Italian Football Federation) Roma
Taborda 58'	Report	Ziółkowski 80'

Olympic Stadium, Athens
Attendance: 27,432
Referee: Juan Martínez Munuera (Spain)

29 January 2026
21:00 (22:00 UTC+2)

Ludogorets Razgrad (Bulgarian Football Union)	1–0	(French Football Federation) Nice
Stanić 42'	Report

Huvepharma Arena, Razgrad
Attendance: 4,792
Referee: Ondřej Berka (Czech Republic)

29 January 2026
21:00

Real Betis (Royal Spanish Football Federation)	2–1	(Royal Dutch Football Association) Feyenoord
Antony 17'; Ezzalzouli 32'	Report	Tengstedt 77'

La Cartuja, Seville
Attendance: 42,688
Referee: Nikola Dabanović (Montenegro)

29 January 2026
21:00

Sturm Graz (Austrian Football Association)	1–0	(Norwegian Football Federation) Brann
Kiteishvili 85'	Report

Liebenauer Stadium, Graz
Attendance: 19,752
Referee: Juxhin Xhaja (Albania)

29 January 2026
21:00

VfB Stuttgart (German Football Association)	3–2	(Swiss Football Association) Young Boys
Undav 6'; Demirović 7'; Andrés 90'	Report	Gigović 42'; Lauper 57'

MHPArena, Stuttgart
Attendance: 57,000
Referee: Javier Alberola Rojas (Spain)
