= 2025–26 UEFA Europa League =

55th season of the UEFA club football tournament

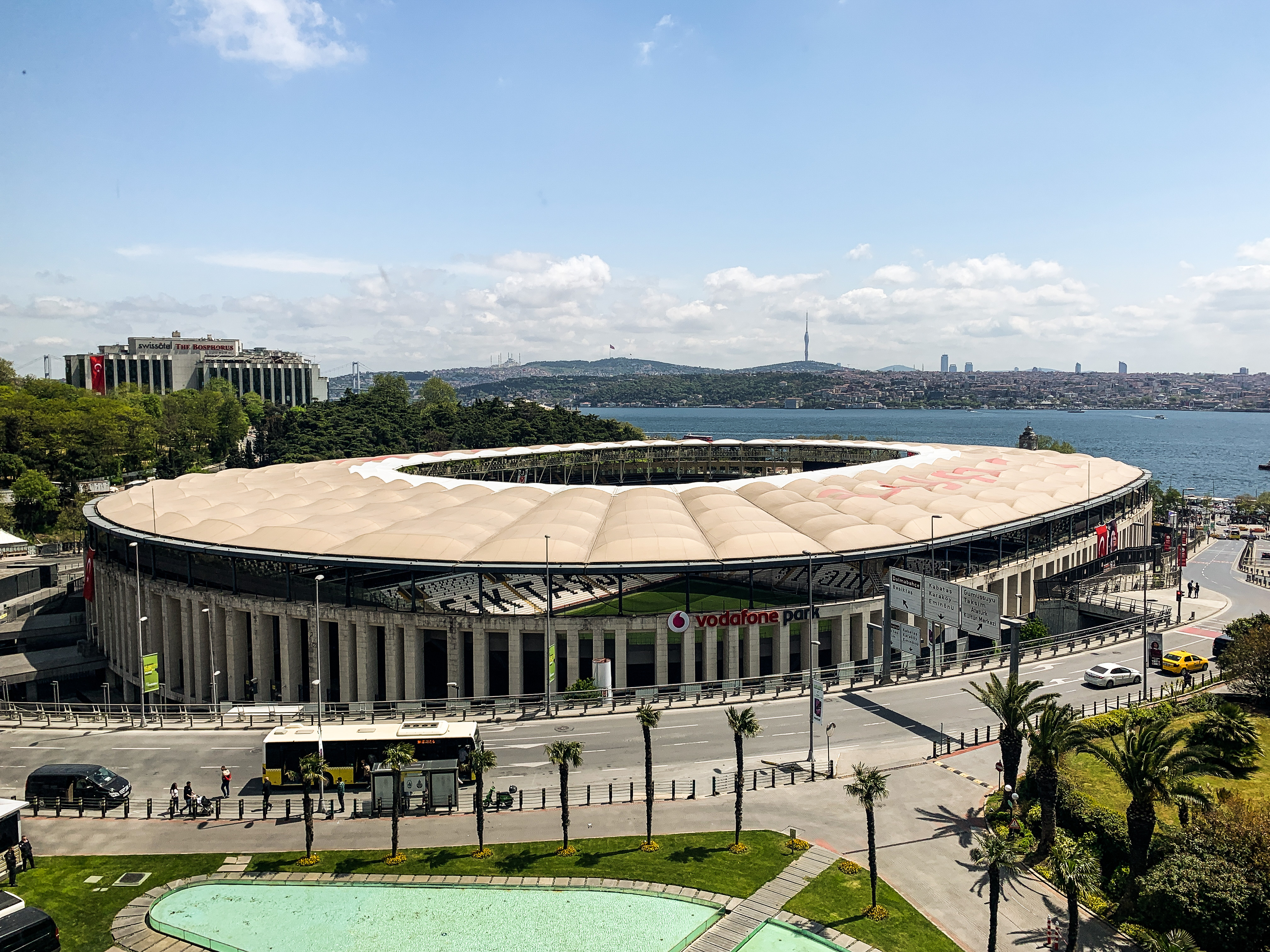
- Beşiktaş Stadium in Istanbul hosted the final

Tournament details
- Dates: Qualifying: 10 July – 28 August 2025; Competition proper: 24 September 2025 – 20 May 2026
- Teams: Competition proper: 25+11; Total: 45+32 (from 41 associations)

Final positions
- Champions: (England) Aston Villa (1st title)
- Runners-up: (Germany) SC Freiburg

Tournament statistics
- Matches played: 189
- Goals scored: 512 (2.71 per match)
- Attendance: 4,954,145 (26,212 per match)
- Top scorer(s): Igor Jesus (Nottingham Forest); Petar Stanić (Ludogorets Razgrad); 7 goals each
- Best player: Morgan Rogers (Aston Villa)
- Best young player: Johan Manzambi (SC Freiburg)

The 2025–26 UEFA Europa League was the 55th season of Europe's secondary club football tournament organised by UEFA, and the 17th season since it was renamed from the UEFA Cup to the UEFA Europa League. This was the second season played under a new format, which replaced the 32-team group stage with a 36-team league phase.

The final was played on 20 May 2026 at Beşiktaş Stadium in Istanbul, Turkey, with Aston Villa being crowned champions for the first time after defeating SC Freiburg 3–0 in the final.

As the reigning champions, Tottenham Hotspur automatically qualified for the Champions League league phase, and were unable to defend their title as the new format did not allow clubs to transfer from the Champions League into the Europa League from the league phase onwards.

== Association team allocation ==
A total of 77 teams from 41 of the 55 UEFA member associations participated in the 2025–26 UEFA Europa League. Among them, 32 associations had teams directly qualifying for the Europa League, while for the other 23 associations that did not have any teams directly qualifying, 9 of them had teams playing after being transferred from the Champions League. The association ranking based on the UEFA association coefficients was used to determine the number of participating teams for each association:

- The title holders of the UEFA Conference League were given an entry in the Europa League (if they did not qualify for the Champions League or Europa League via league position).
- Associations 1–12 each had two teams.
- Associations 13–33 (except Russia) each had one team.
- 32 teams eliminated from the 2025–26 UEFA Champions League qualifying phase and play-off round were transferred to the Europa League.

=== Association ranking ===
For the 2025–26 UEFA Europa League, the associations were allocated places according to their 2024 UEFA association coefficients, which took into account their performance in European competitions from 2019–20 to 2023–24.

Apart from the allocation based on the association coefficients, associations could have additional teams participating in the Europa League, as noted below:

- (UCL) – Additional teams transferred from the UEFA Champions League
- (CON) – Additional teams transferred from the UEFA Conference League

Association ranking for 2025–26 UEFA Europa League

Rank	Association	Coeff.	Teams	Notes
1	England	104.303	2	
2	Italy	90.284	2	
3	Spain	89.489	2	
4	Germany	86.624	2	
5	France	66.831	2	+1 (UCL)
6	Netherlands	61.300	2	+1 (UCL)
7	Portugal	56.316	2	
8	Belgium	48.800	2	
9	Turkey	38.600	2	+1 (UCL)
10	Czech Republic	36.050	2	+1 (UCL)
11	Scotland	36.050	2	+2 (UCL)
12	Switzerland	32.975	2	+2 (UCL)
13	Austria	32.600	1	+2 (UCL)
14	Norway	31.625	1	+1 (UCL)
15	Greece	31.525	1	+1 (UCL)
16	Denmark	31.450	1	
17	Israel	31.125	1	+1 (UCL)
18	Ukraine	28.000	1	+1 (UCL)
19	Serbia	27.775	1	+1 (UCL)

Rank	Association	Coeff.	Teams	Notes
20	Croatia	25.525	1	+1 (UCL)
21	Poland	25.375	1	+1 (UCL)
22	Russia	22.965	0	
23	Cyprus	22.100	1	
24	Hungary	21.875	1	+1 (UCL)
25	Sweden	21.500	1	+1 (UCL)
26	Romania	21.375	1	+1 (UCL)
27	Bulgaria	20.375	1	+1 (UCL)
28	Azerbaijan	20.125	1	
29	Slovakia	19.625	1	+1 (UCL)
30	Slovenia	13.250	1	
31	Moldova	13.125	1	
32	Kosovo	11.541	1	+1 (UCL)
33	Kazakhstan	11.500	1	
34	Finland	11.125	0	+1 (UCL) +1 (CON)
35	Republic of Ireland	10.875	0	+1 (UCL)
36	Armenia	10.625	0	+1 (UCL)
37	Latvia	10.625	0	+1 (UCL)

Rank	Association	Coeff.	Teams	Notes
38	Faroe Islands	10.375	0	
39	Bosnia and Herzegovina	10.000	0	+1 (UCL)
40	Liechtenstein	10.000	0	
41	Iceland	9.583	0	+1 (UCL)
42	Northern Ireland	9.208	0	
43	Luxembourg	8.625	0	
44	Lithuania	8.500	0	
45	Malta	8.250	0	+1 (UCL)
46	Georgia	7.625	0	
47	Albania	7.375	0	
48	Estonia	7.207	0	
49	Belarus	6.625	0	
50	North Macedonia	6.000	0	+1 (UCL)
51	Andorra	5.998	0	
52	Wales	5.791	0	
53	Montenegro	5.708	0	
54	Gibraltar	4.957	0	+1 (UCL)
55	San Marino	1.832	0	

=== Distribution ===
		Teams entering in this round	Teams advancing from the previous round	Teams transferred from Champions League
First qualifying round (16 teams)		16 domestic cup winners from associations 17–34 (except Russia and Croatia)		
Second qualifying round (16 teams)		1 domestic cup winner from association 16; 6 domestic league third-placed teams from associations 7–12; 1 domestic league fourth-placed team from association 6	8 winners from the first qualifying round	
Third qualifying round (26 teams)	Champions Path (12 teams)			12 losers from Champions League second qualifying round (Champions Path)
Third qualifying round (26 teams)	League Path (14 teams)	3 domestic cup winners from associations 13–15	8 winners from second qualifying round	3 losers from Champions League second qualifying round (League Path)
Play-off round (24 teams)		5 domestic cup winners from associations 8–12	13 winners from third qualifying round	6 losers from Champions League third qualifying round (Champions Path)
League phase (36 teams)		7 domestic cup winners from associations 1–7; 5 domestic league fifth-placed teams from associations 1–5; 1 cup winner from association 20 as the team with the highest club coefficient, originally from the first qualifying round	12 winners from play-off round	5 losers from Champions League play-off round (Champions Path); 4 losers from Champions League third qualifying round (League Path); 2 losers from Champions League play-off round (League Path)
Knockout phase play-offs (16 teams)			16 teams ranked 9–24 from the league phase	
Round of 16 (16 teams)			8 teams ranked 1–8 from the league phase; 8 winners from the knockout phase play-offs	

The information here reflects the ongoing suspension of Russia in European football, and so the following changes to the default access list were made:

- The cup winners of association 16 (Denmark) entered the second qualifying round instead of the first qualifying round.

As the Conference League title holders (Chelsea) qualified for the Champions League league phase via their domestic league's standard berth allocation, the following changes to the default access list were made:

- Dinamo Zagreb, as the club with the highest club coefficient that would otherwise have entered the qualifying phase or play-off round, entered the league phase instead of the first qualifying round.
- The cup winners of association 34 (Finland) entered the first qualifying round, instead of the Conference League second qualifying round.

=== Teams ===
The labels in the parentheses show how each team qualified for the place of its starting round:

- CON: Conference League title holders
- CW: Cup winners
- 3rd, 4th, 5th, etc.: League position of the previous season
- RL: Winners of the regular league phase
- CL: Transferred from the Champions League
  - CH/LP PO: Losers from the play-off round (Champions/League Path)
  - CH/LP Q3: Losers from the third qualifying round (Champions/League Path)
  - CH/LP Q2: Losers from the second qualifying round (Champions/League Path)

The third qualifying round was divided into Champions Path (CH) and Main Path (MP).

Qualified teams for 2025–26 UEFA Europa League
Entry round		Teams			
League phase		(England) Aston Villa (6th)	(England) Nottingham Forest (7th)	(Italy) Bologna (CW)	(Italy) Roma (5th)
League phase		(Spain) Real Betis (6th)	(Spain) Celta Vigo (7th)	(Germany) VfB Stuttgart (CW)	(Germany) SC Freiburg (5th)
League phase		(France) Lille (5th)	(France) Lyon (6th)	(Netherlands) Go Ahead Eagles (CW)	(Portugal) Porto (3rd)
League phase		(Croatia) Dinamo Zagreb (2nd)	(Scotland) Celtic (CL CH PO)	(Switzerland) Basel (CL CH PO)	(Austria) Sturm Graz (CL CH PO)
League phase		(Serbia) Red Star Belgrade (CL CH PO)	(Hungary) Ferencváros (CL CH PO)	(Turkey) Fenerbahçe (CL LP PO)	(Scotland) Rangers (CL LP PO)
League phase		(France) Nice (CL LP Q3)	(Netherlands) Feyenoord (CL LP Q3)	(Czech Republic) Viktoria Plzeň (CL LP Q3)	(Austria) Red Bull Salzburg (CL LP Q3)
Play-off round		(Belgium) Genk (3rd)	(Turkey) Samsunspor (3rd)	(Czech Republic) Sigma Olomouc (CW)	(Scotland) Aberdeen (CW)
Play-off round		(Switzerland) Young Boys (3rd)	(Ukraine) Dynamo Kyiv (CL CH Q3)	(Poland) Lech Poznań (CL CH Q3)	(Sweden) Malmö FF (CL CH Q3)
Play-off round		(Bulgaria) Ludogorets Razgrad (CL CH Q3)	(Slovakia) Slovan Bratislava (CL CH Q3)	(North Macedonia) Shkëndija (CL CH Q3)	
Third qualifying round	CH	(Israel) Maccabi Tel Aviv (CL CH Q2)	(Croatia) Rijeka (CL CH Q2)	(Romania) FCSB (CL CH Q2)	(Kosovo) Drita (CL CH Q2)
Third qualifying round	CH	(Finland) KuPS (CL CH Q2)	(Republic of Ireland) Shelbourne (CL CH Q2)	(Armenia) Noah (CL CH Q2)	(Latvia) RFS (CL CH Q2)
Third qualifying round	CH	(Bosnia and Herzegovina) Zrinjski Mostar (CL CH Q2)	(Iceland) Breiðablik (CL CH Q2)	(Malta) Hamrun Spartans (CL CH Q2)	(Gibraltar) Lincoln Red Imps (CL CH Q2)
Third qualifying round	MP	(Austria) Wolfsberger AC (CW)	(Norway) Fredrikstad (CW)	(Greece) PAOK (3rd)	(Switzerland) Servette (CL LP Q2)
Third qualifying round	MP	(Norway) Brann (CL LP Q2)	(Greece) Panathinaikos (CL LP Q2)		
Second qualifying round		(Netherlands) Utrecht (4th)	(Portugal) Braga (4th)	(Belgium) Anderlecht (4th)	(Turkey) Beşiktaş (4th)
Second qualifying round		(Czech Republic) Baník Ostrava (3rd)	(Scotland) Hibernian (3rd)	(Switzerland) Lugano (4th)	(Denmark) Midtjylland (2nd)
First qualifying round		(Israel) Hapoel Be'er Sheva (CW)	(Ukraine) Shakhtar Donetsk (CW)	(Serbia) Partizan (2nd)	(Poland) Legia Warsaw (CW)
First qualifying round		(Cyprus) AEK Larnaca (CW)	(Hungary) Paks (CW)	(Sweden) BK Häcken (CW)	(Romania) CFR Cluj (CW)
First qualifying round		(Bulgaria) Levski Sofia (2nd)	(Azerbaijan) Sabah (CW)	(Slovakia) Spartak Trnava (CW)	(Slovenia) Celje (CW)
First qualifying round		(Moldova) Sheriff Tiraspol (CW)	(Kosovo) Prishtina (CW)	(Kazakhstan) Aktobe (CW)	(Finland) Ilves (2nd)

Notes

1. England (ENG): Initially, Crystal Palace qualified for the Europa League as the winners of the 2024–25 FA Cup. However, UEFA ruled that Crystal Palace and Lyon were both part of a group owned by the same company prior to 1 March, and as such could not compete in the same competition under UEFA rules so their place in the Europa League was awarded to Nottingham Forest under a swap of European rights. Palace's appeal was rejected by the Court of Arbitration for Sport on 11 August, resulting in Forest's Europa League place being confirmed. Forest had previously gained entry to the Conference League based on their 2024–25 Premier League position, in lieu of 2024–25 EFL Cup winners Newcastle United, who qualified for the Champions League via league position.
2. Russia (RUS): On 28 February 2022, Russian football clubs and national teams were suspended from FIFA and UEFA competitions due to the Russian invasion of Ukraine. The tables reflect Russia's ongoing suspension from UEFA competitions.

== Schedule ==
The schedule of the competition was as follows. Matches were scheduled for Thursdays, apart from the final, which took place on a Wednesday, though exceptionally could take place on Tuesdays or Wednesdays due to scheduling conflicts. One exclusive week was held where both Wednesday and Thursdays were matchdays, on 24 and 25 September.

Schedule for 2025–26 UEFA Europa League
Phase	Round	Draw date	First leg	Second leg
Qualifying	First qualifying round	17 June 2025	10 July 2025	17 July 2025
Qualifying	Second qualifying round	18 June 2025	24 July 2025	31 July 2025
Qualifying	Third qualifying round	21 July 2025	7 August 2025	14 August 2025
Play-offs	Play-off round	4 August 2025	21 August 2025	28 August 2025
League phase	Matchday 1	29 August 2025	24–25 September 2025	
League phase	Matchday 2	29 August 2025	2 October 2025	
League phase	Matchday 3	29 August 2025	23 October 2025	
League phase	Matchday 4	29 August 2025	6 November 2025	
League phase	Matchday 5	29 August 2025	27 November 2025	
League phase	Matchday 6	29 August 2025	11 December 2025	
League phase	Matchday 7	29 August 2025	22 January 2026	
League phase	Matchday 8	29 August 2025	29 January 2026	
Knockout phase	Knockout round play-offs	30 January 2026	19 February 2026	26 February 2026
Knockout phase	Round of 16	27 February 2026	12 March 2026	19 March 2026
Knockout phase	Quarter-finals	—N/a	9 April 2026	16 April 2026
Knockout phase	Semi-finals	—N/a	30 April 2026	7 May 2026
Knockout phase	Final	—N/a	20 May 2026 at Beşiktaş Stadium, Istanbul	

== Qualifying rounds ==
=== First qualifying round ===
The draw for the first qualifying round was held on 17 June 2025. The first legs were played on 10 July, and the second legs were played on 17 July 2025.

The winners of the ties advanced to the second qualifying round. The losers were transferred to the Conference League Main Path second qualifying round.

First qualifying round
Team 1	Agg.	Team 2	1st leg	2nd leg
Shakhtar Donetsk (Ukraine)	6–0	(Finland) Ilves	6–0	0–0
Sheriff Tiraspol (Moldova)	5–2	(Kosovo) Prishtina	4–0	1–2
Spartak Trnava (Slovakia)	2–3	(Sweden) BK Häcken	0–1	2–2
Sabah (Azerbaijan)	5–6	(Slovenia) Celje	2–3	3–3 (a.e.t.)
Legia Warsaw (Poland)	2–0	(Kazakhstan) Aktobe	1–0	1–0
Levski Sofia (Bulgaria)	1–1 (3–1 p)	(Israel) Hapoel Be'er Sheva	0–0	1–1 (a.e.t.)
AEK Larnaca (Cyprus)	2–2 (6–5 p)	(Serbia) Partizan	1–0	1–2 (a.e.t.)
Paks (Hungary)	0–3	(Romania) CFR Cluj	0–0	0–3

=== Second qualifying round ===
The draw for the second qualifying round was held on 18 June 2025. The first legs were played on 24 July and the second legs were played on 31 July 2025.

The winners of the ties advanced to the Main Path third qualifying round. The losers were transferred to the Conference League Main Path third qualifying round.

Second qualifying round
Team 1	Agg.	Team 2	1st leg	2nd leg
Lugano (Switzerland)	0–1	(Romania) CFR Cluj	0–0	0–1 (a.e.t.)
Celje (Slovenia)	2–3	(Cyprus) AEK Larnaca	1–1	1–2
Levski Sofia (Bulgaria)	0–1	(Portugal) Braga	0–0	0–1 (a.e.t.)
Baník Ostrava (Czech Republic)	3–4	(Poland) Legia Warsaw	2–2	1–2
Anderlecht (Belgium)	2–2 (2–4 p)	(Sweden) BK Häcken	1–0	1–2 (a.e.t.)
Sheriff Tiraspol (Moldova)	2–7	(Netherlands) Utrecht	1–3	1–4
Midtjylland (Denmark)	3–2	(Scotland) Hibernian	1–1	2–1 (a.e.t.)
Beşiktaş (Turkey)	2–6	(Ukraine) Shakhtar Donetsk	2–4	0–2

=== Third qualifying round ===
The draw for the third qualifying round was held on 21 July 2025. The first legs were played on 5, 6 and 7 August, and the second legs were played on 12 and 14 August 2025.

The winners of the ties advanced to the play-off round. The losers were transferred to the Conference League play-off round.

Third qualifying round
Team 1	Agg.	Team 2	1st leg	2nd leg
Champions Path
Lincoln Red Imps (Gibraltar)	1–1 (6–5 p)	(Armenia) Noah	1–1	0–0 (a.e.t.)
Rijeka (Croatia)	4–3	(Republic of Ireland) Shelbourne	1–2	3–1
RFS (Latvia)	1–3	(Finland) KuPS	1–2	0–1
Hamrun Spartans (Malta)	2–5	(Israel) Maccabi Tel Aviv	1–2	1–3
Zrinjski Mostar (Bosnia and Herzegovina)	3–2	(Iceland) Breiðablik	1–1	2–1
FCSB (Romania)	6–3	(Kosovo) Drita	3–2	3–1
Main Path
AEK Larnaca (Cyprus)	5–3	(Poland) Legia Warsaw	4–1	1–2
Fredrikstad (Norway)	1–5	(Denmark) Midtjylland	1–3	0–2
CFR Cluj (Romania)	1–4	(Portugal) Braga	1–2	0–2
PAOK (Greece)	1–0	(Austria) Wolfsberger AC	0–0	1–0 (a.e.t.)
Servette (Switzerland)	2–5	(Netherlands) Utrecht	1–3	1–2
BK Häcken (Sweden)	1–2	(Norway) Brann	0–2	1–0
Panathinaikos (Greece)	0–0 (4–3 p)	(Ukraine) Shakhtar Donetsk	0–0	0–0 (a.e.t.)

== Play-off round ==
The draw for the play-off round was held on 4 August 2025. The first legs were played on 21 August, and the second legs were played on 27 and 28 August 2025.

The winners of the ties advanced to the league phase. The losers were transferred to the Conference League league phase.

Play-off round
Team 1	Agg.	Team 2	1st leg	2nd leg
Maccabi Tel Aviv (Israel)	3–2	(Ukraine) Dynamo Kyiv	3–1	0–1
Shkëndija (North Macedonia)	3–5	(Bulgaria) Ludogorets Razgrad	2–1	1–4 (a.e.t.)
Slovan Bratislava (Slovakia)	2–4	(Switzerland) Young Boys	0–1	2–3
Malmö FF (Sweden)	5–0	(Czech Republic) Sigma Olomouc	3–0	2–0
Panathinaikos (Greece)	2–1	(Turkey) Samsunspor	2–1	0–0
Aberdeen (Scotland)	2–5	(Romania) FCSB	2–2	0–3
Lech Poznań (Poland)	3–6	(Belgium) Genk	1–5	2–1
Midtjylland (Denmark)	6–0	(Finland) KuPS	4–0	2–0
Lincoln Red Imps (Gibraltar)	1–9	(Portugal) Braga	0–4	1–5
Zrinjski Mostar (Bosnia and Herzegovina)	0–2	(Netherlands) Utrecht	0–2	0–0
Brann (Norway)	6–1	(Cyprus) AEK Larnaca	2–1	4–0
Rijeka (Croatia)	1–5	(Greece) PAOK	1–0	0–5

== League phase ==
Location of Benelux teams in the 2025–26 UEFA Europa League league phase
Location of teams in the 2025–26 UEFA Europa League league phase

The league phase draw for the 2025–26 UEFA Europa League took place on 29 August 2025. The 36 teams were divided into four pots of nine teams each, based on their UEFA club coefficient.

The draw ceremony was held along with the league phase draw for the 2025–26 UEFA Conference League, as a change from the previous season. When the 36 teams were manually drawn one at a time, the draw was entirely computer generated with all 36 teams' opponents and home/away locations drawn at once, but revealed pot by pot. Each team faced two opponents from each of the four pots, one at home and one away. Teams could not face opponents from their own association, and could only be drawn against a maximum of two sides from the same association.

Aston Villa, Bologna, Brann, Go Ahead Eagles and Nottingham Forest made their debut appearances since the introduction of the group stage (although Aston Villa and Brann had previously appeared in the UEFA Cup group stage). Go Ahead Eagles and Nottingham Forest made their debut appearances in a major UEFA competition group or league phase.

A total of 23 national associations were represented in the league phase.

=== Table ===
Pos	Team	Pld	W	D	L	GF	GA	GD	Pts	Qualification
1	(French Football Federation) Lyon	8	7	0	1	18	5	+13	21	Advance to round of 16 (seeded)
2	(The Football Association) Aston Villa	8	7	0	1	14	6	+8	21	Advance to round of 16 (seeded)
3	(Danish Football Association) Midtjylland	8	6	1	1	18	8	+10	19	Advance to round of 16 (seeded)
4	(Royal Spanish Football Federation) Real Betis	8	5	2	1	13	7	+6	17 (Note: Away goals scored: Real Betis 5, Porto 3.)	Advance to round of 16 (seeded)
5	(Portuguese Football Federation) Porto	8	5	2	1	13	7	+6	17	Advance to round of 16 (seeded)
6	(Portuguese Football Federation) Braga	8	5	2	1	11	5	+6	17	Advance to round of 16 (seeded)
7	(German Football Association) SC Freiburg	8	5	2	1	10	4	+6	17	Advance to round of 16 (seeded)
8	(Italian Football Federation) Roma	8	5	1	2	13	6	+7	16	Advance to round of 16 (seeded)
9	(Royal Belgian Football Association) Genk	8	5	1	2	11	7	+4	16	Advance to knockout phase play-offs (seeded)
10	(Italian Football Federation) Bologna	8	4	3	1	14	7	+7	15	Advance to knockout phase play-offs (seeded)
11	(German Football Association) VfB Stuttgart	8	5	0	3	15	9	+6	15	Advance to knockout phase play-offs (seeded)
12	(Hungarian Football Federation) Ferencváros	8	4	3	1	12	11	+1	15	Advance to knockout phase play-offs (seeded)
13	(The Football Association) Nottingham Forest	8	4	2	2	15	7	+8	14	Advance to knockout phase play-offs (seeded)
14	(Football Association of the Czech Republic) Viktoria Plzeň	8	3	5	0	8	3	+5	14	Advance to knockout phase play-offs (seeded)
15	(Football Association of Serbia) Red Star Belgrade	8	4	2	2	7	6	+1	14	Advance to knockout phase play-offs (seeded)
16	(Royal Spanish Football Federation) Celta Vigo	8	4	1	3	15	11	+4	13	Advance to knockout phase play-offs (seeded)
17	(Hellenic Football Federation) PAOK	8	3	3	2	17	14	+3	12	Advance to knockout phase play-offs (unseeded)
18	(French Football Federation) Lille	8	4	0	4	12	9	+3	12	Advance to knockout phase play-offs (unseeded)
19	(Turkish Football Federation) Fenerbahçe	8	3	3	2	10	7	+3	12	Advance to knockout phase play-offs (unseeded)
20	(Hellenic Football Federation) Panathinaikos	8	3	3	2	11	9	+2	12	Advance to knockout phase play-offs (unseeded)
21	(Scottish Football Association) Celtic	8	3	2	3	13	15	−2	11	Advance to knockout phase play-offs (unseeded)
22	(Bulgarian Football Union) Ludogorets Razgrad	8	3	1	4	12	15	−3	10	Advance to knockout phase play-offs (unseeded)
23	(Croatian Football Federation) Dinamo Zagreb	8	3	1	4	12	16	−4	10	Advance to knockout phase play-offs (unseeded)
24	(Norwegian Football Federation) Brann	8	2	3	3	9	11	−2	9	Advance to knockout phase play-offs (unseeded)
25	(Swiss Football Association) Young Boys	8	3	0	5	10	16	−6	9	
26	(Austrian Football Association) Sturm Graz	8	2	1	5	5	11	−6	7	
27	(Romanian Football Federation) FCSB	8	2	1	5	9	16	−7	7	
28	(Royal Dutch Football Association) Go Ahead Eagles	8	2	1	5	6	14	−8	7	
29	(Royal Dutch Football Association) Feyenoord	8	2	0	6	11	15	−4	6	
30	(Swiss Football Association) Basel	8	2	0	6	9	13	−4	6	
31	(Austrian Football Association) Red Bull Salzburg	8	2	0	6	10	15	−5	6	
32	(Scottish Football Association) Rangers	8	1	1	6	5	14	−9	4	
33	(French Football Federation) Nice	8	1	0	7	7	15	−8	3	
34	(Royal Dutch Football Association) Utrecht	8	0	1	7	5	15	−10	1	
35	(Swedish Football Association) Malmö FF	8	0	1	7	4	15	−11	1	
36	(Israel Football Association) Maccabi Tel Aviv	8	0	1	7	2	22	−20	1	

Source: UEFA
Rules for classification: League phase tiebreakers

=== Results ===
Matchday 1
Home team	Score	Away team
Midtjylland (Denmark)	2–0	(Austria) Sturm Graz
PAOK (Greece)	0–0	(Israel) Maccabi Tel Aviv
Red Star Belgrade (Serbia)	1–1	(Scotland) Celtic
Dinamo Zagreb (Croatia)	3–1	(Turkey) Fenerbahçe
Malmö FF (Sweden)	1–2	(Bulgaria) Ludogorets Razgrad
Nice (France)	1–2	(Italy) Roma
Real Betis (Spain)	2–2	(England) Nottingham Forest
Braga (Portugal)	1–0	(Netherlands) Feyenoord
SC Freiburg (Germany)	2–1	(Switzerland) Basel
Go Ahead Eagles (Netherlands)	0–1	(Romania) FCSB
Lille (France)	2–1	(Norway) Brann
Aston Villa (England)	1–0	(Italy) Bologna
Young Boys (Switzerland)	1–4	(Greece) Panathinaikos
Red Bull Salzburg (Austria)	0–1	(Portugal) Porto
Utrecht (Netherlands)	0–1	(France) Lyon
Ferencváros (Hungary)	1–1	(Czech Republic) Viktoria Plzeň
Rangers (Scotland)	0–1	(Belgium) Genk
VfB Stuttgart (Germany)	2–1	(Spain) Celta Vigo

Matchday 2
Home team	Score	Away team
Roma (Italy)	0–1	(France) Lille
Bologna (Italy)	1–1	(Germany) SC Freiburg
Celtic (Scotland)	0–2	(Portugal) Braga
Viktoria Plzeň (Czech Republic)	3–0	(Sweden) Malmö FF
Fenerbahçe (Turkey)	2–1	(France) Nice
FCSB (Romania)	0–2	(Switzerland) Young Boys
Panathinaikos (Greece)	1–2	(Netherlands) Go Ahead Eagles
Ludogorets Razgrad (Bulgaria)	0–2	(Spain) Real Betis
Brann (Norway)	1–0	(Netherlands) Utrecht
Basel (Switzerland)	2–0	(Germany) VfB Stuttgart
Porto (Portugal)	2–1	(Serbia) Red Star Belgrade
Feyenoord (Netherlands)	0–2	(England) Aston Villa
Genk (Belgium)	0–1	(Hungary) Ferencváros
Maccabi Tel Aviv (Israel)	1–3	(Croatia) Dinamo Zagreb
Nottingham Forest (England)	2–3	(Denmark) Midtjylland
Lyon (France)	2–0	(Austria) Red Bull Salzburg
Celta Vigo (Spain)	3–1	(Greece) PAOK
Sturm Graz (Austria)	2–1	(Scotland) Rangers

Matchday 3
Home team	Score	Away team
Red Bull Salzburg (Austria)	2–3	(Hungary) Ferencváros
Fenerbahçe (Turkey)	1–0	(Germany) VfB Stuttgart
FCSB (Romania)	1–2	(Italy) Bologna
Go Ahead Eagles (Netherlands)	2–1	(England) Aston Villa
Genk (Belgium)	0–0	(Spain) Real Betis
Lyon (France)	2–0	(Switzerland) Basel
Braga (Portugal)	2–0	(Serbia) Red Star Belgrade
Brann (Norway)	3–0	(Scotland) Rangers
Feyenoord (Netherlands)	3–1	(Greece) Panathinaikos
Roma (Italy)	1–2	(Czech Republic) Viktoria Plzeň
Young Boys (Switzerland)	3–2	(Bulgaria) Ludogorets Razgrad
Celtic (Scotland)	2–1	(Austria) Sturm Graz
Lille (France)	3–4	(Greece) PAOK
Maccabi Tel Aviv (Israel)	0–3	(Denmark) Midtjylland
Malmö FF (Sweden)	1–1	(Croatia) Dinamo Zagreb
Nottingham Forest (England)	2–0	(Portugal) Porto
Celta Vigo (Spain)	2–1	(France) Nice
SC Freiburg (Germany)	2–0	(Netherlands) Utrecht

Matchday 4
Home team	Score	Away team
Red Bull Salzburg (Austria)	2–0	(Netherlands) Go Ahead Eagles
Basel (Switzerland)	3–1	(Romania) FCSB
Midtjylland (Denmark)	3–1	(Scotland) Celtic
Utrecht (Netherlands)	1–1	(Portugal) Porto
Red Star Belgrade (Serbia)	1–0	(France) Lille
Dinamo Zagreb (Croatia)	0–3	(Spain) Celta Vigo
Malmö FF (Sweden)	0–1	(Greece) Panathinaikos
Nice (France)	1–3	(Germany) SC Freiburg
Sturm Graz (Austria)	0–0	(England) Nottingham Forest
Aston Villa (England)	2–0	(Israel) Maccabi Tel Aviv
Bologna (Italy)	0–0	(Norway) Brann
Viktoria Plzeň (Czech Republic)	0–0	(Turkey) Fenerbahçe
Ferencváros (Hungary)	3–1	(Bulgaria) Ludogorets Razgrad
PAOK (Greece)	4–0	(Switzerland) Young Boys
Rangers (Scotland)	0–2	(Italy) Roma
Real Betis (Spain)	2–0	(France) Lyon
Braga (Portugal)	3–4	(Belgium) Genk
VfB Stuttgart (Germany)	2–0	(Netherlands) Feyenoord

Matchday 5
Home team	Score	Away team
Roma (Italy)	2–1	(Denmark) Midtjylland
Aston Villa (England)	2–1	(Switzerland) Young Boys
Porto (Portugal)	3–0	(France) Nice
Viktoria Plzeň (Czech Republic)	0–0	(Germany) SC Freiburg
Fenerbahçe (Turkey)	1–1	(Hungary) Ferencváros
Feyenoord (Netherlands)	1–3	(Scotland) Celtic
Lille (France)	4–0	(Croatia) Dinamo Zagreb
PAOK (Greece)	1–1	(Norway) Brann
Ludogorets Razgrad (Bulgaria)	3–2	(Spain) Celta Vigo
Bologna (Italy)	4–1	(Austria) Red Bull Salzburg
Red Star Belgrade (Serbia)	1–0	(Romania) FCSB
Go Ahead Eagles (Netherlands)	0–4	(Germany) VfB Stuttgart
Genk (Belgium)	2–1	(Switzerland) Basel
Maccabi Tel Aviv (Israel)	0–6	(France) Lyon
Nottingham Forest (England)	3–0	(Sweden) Malmö FF
Panathinaikos (Greece)	2–1	(Austria) Sturm Graz
Rangers (Scotland)	1–1	(Portugal) Braga
Real Betis (Spain)	2–1	(Netherlands) Utrecht

Matchday 6
Home team	Score	Away team
Young Boys (Switzerland)	1–0	(France) Lille
Midtjylland (Denmark)	1–0	(Belgium) Genk
Utrecht (Netherlands)	1–2	(England) Nottingham Forest
Ferencváros (Hungary)	2–1	(Scotland) Rangers
Dinamo Zagreb (Croatia)	1–3	(Spain) Real Betis
Nice (France)	0–1	(Portugal) Braga
Ludogorets Razgrad (Bulgaria)	3–3	(Greece) PAOK
Sturm Graz (Austria)	0–1	(Serbia) Red Star Belgrade
VfB Stuttgart (Germany)	4–1	(Israel) Maccabi Tel Aviv
Celtic (Scotland)	0–3	(Italy) Roma
Porto (Portugal)	2–1	(Sweden) Malmö FF
Basel (Switzerland)	1–2	(England) Aston Villa
FCSB (Romania)	4–3	(Netherlands) Feyenoord
Lyon (France)	2–1	(Netherlands) Go Ahead Eagles
Panathinaikos (Greece)	0–0	(Czech Republic) Viktoria Plzeň
Celta Vigo (Spain)	1–2	(Italy) Bologna
SC Freiburg (Germany)	1–0	(Austria) Red Bull Salzburg
Brann (Norway)	0–4	(Turkey) Fenerbahçe

Matchday 7
Home team	Score	Away team
Bologna (Italy)	2–2	(Scotland) Celtic
Young Boys (Switzerland)	0–1	(France) Lyon
Viktoria Plzeň (Czech Republic)	1–1	(Portugal) Porto
Fenerbahçe (Turkey)	0–1	(England) Aston Villa
Feyenoord (Netherlands)	3–0	(Austria) Sturm Graz
Malmö FF (Sweden)	0–1	(Serbia) Red Star Belgrade
PAOK (Greece)	2–0	(Spain) Real Betis
SC Freiburg (Germany)	1–0	(Israel) Maccabi Tel Aviv
Brann (Norway)	3–3	(Denmark) Midtjylland
Roma (Italy)	2–0	(Germany) VfB Stuttgart
Red Bull Salzburg (Austria)	3–1	(Switzerland) Basel
Ferencváros (Hungary)	1–1	(Greece) Panathinaikos
Dinamo Zagreb (Croatia)	4–1	(Romania) FCSB
Nice (France)	3–1	(Netherlands) Go Ahead Eagles
Rangers (Scotland)	1–0	(Bulgaria) Ludogorets Razgrad
Celta Vigo (Spain)	2–1	(France) Lille
Braga (Portugal)	1–0	(England) Nottingham Forest
Utrecht (Netherlands)	0–2	(Belgium) Genk

Matchday 8
Home team	Score	Away team
Aston Villa (England)	3–2	(Austria) Red Bull Salzburg
Celtic (Scotland)	4–2	(Netherlands) Utrecht
Porto (Portugal)	3–1	(Scotland) Rangers
Basel (Switzerland)	0–1	(Czech Republic) Viktoria Plzeň
Midtjylland (Denmark)	2–0	(Croatia) Dinamo Zagreb
Red Star Belgrade (Serbia)	1–1	(Spain) Celta Vigo
FCSB (Romania)	1–1	(Turkey) Fenerbahçe
Go Ahead Eagles (Netherlands)	0–0	(Portugal) Braga
Genk (Belgium)	2–1	(Sweden) Malmö FF
Lille (France)	1–0	(Germany) SC Freiburg
Maccabi Tel Aviv (Israel)	0–3	(Italy) Bologna
Nottingham Forest (England)	4–0	(Hungary) Ferencváros
Lyon (France)	4–2	(Greece) PAOK
Panathinaikos (Greece)	1–1	(Italy) Roma
Ludogorets Razgrad (Bulgaria)	1–0	(France) Nice
Real Betis (Spain)	2–1	(Netherlands) Feyenoord
Sturm Graz (Austria)	1–0	(Norway) Brann
VfB Stuttgart (Germany)	3–2	(Switzerland) Young Boys

== Knockout phase ==
In the knockout phase, teams played against each other over two legs on a home-and-away basis, except for the one-match final. The bracket structure for the knockout phase was partially fixed in advance using seeding, with teams' positions in the bracket determined by the final standings in the league phase. In the knockout phase, there was no country protection, with teams from the same association able to face each other in any round. Teams could also face opponents they played during the league phase.

The mechanism of the draws for each round was as follows:

- In the draw for the knockout phase play-offs, the eight teams finishing the league phase in positions 9–16 were seeded, and the eight teams finishing the league phase in positions 17–24 were unseeded. The draw was split into four sections based on the predetermined bracket, with the seeded teams in each section drawn against one of their two possible unseeded opponents. The seeded teams hosted the second leg.
- In the draw for the round of 16, the eight teams finishing the league phase in positions 1–8 were seeded, and the eight winners of the knockout phase play-offs were unseeded. Again, the draw was split into four sections based on the predetermined bracket, with the seeded teams in each section drawn against one of their two possible unseeded opponents. The seeded teams hosted the second leg.

In the quarter-finals and semi-finals, both the exact match pairings and order of legs were predetermined based on the tournament bracket. The teams with the better league phase ranking played the second leg of each round at home if they continued advancing. Should a seeded team have been beaten, the team that eliminated them took over their seeding position. The winner of semi-final 1 was designated as the "home" team for the final (for administrative purposes, as it was played at a neutral venue).

=== Bracket ===
Knockout phase play-offs
22	(Bulgaria) Ludogorets Razgrad	2	0	2
12	(Hungary) Ferencváros	1	2	3
20	(Greece) Panathinaikos (p)	2	1	3 (4)
14	(Czech Republic) Viktoria Plzeň	2	1	3 (3)
23	(Croatia) Dinamo Zagreb	1	3	4
9	(Belgium) Genk (a.e.t.)	3	3	6
17	(Greece) PAOK	1	0	1
16	(Spain) Celta Vigo	2	1	3
21	(Scotland) Celtic	1	1	2
11	(Germany) VfB Stuttgart	4	0	4
19	(Turkey) Fenerbahçe	0	2	2
13	(England) Nottingham Forest	3	1	4
24	(Norway) Brann	0	0	0
10	(Italy) Bologna	1	1	2
18	(France) Lille (a.e.t.)	0	2	2
15	(Serbia) Red Star Belgrade	1	0	1

Round of 16
12	(Hungary) Ferencváros	2	0	2
6	(Portugal) Braga	0	4	4
20	(Greece) Panathinaikos	1	0	1
4	(Spain) Real Betis	0	4	4
9	(Belgium) Genk	1	1	2
7	(Germany) SC Freiburg	0	5	5
16	(Spain) Celta Vigo	1	2	3
1	(France) Lyon	1	0	1
11	(Germany) VfB Stuttgart	1	0	1
5	(Portugal) Porto	2	2	4
13	(England) Nottingham Forest (p)	0	2	2 (3)
3	(Denmark) Midtjylland	1	1	2 (0)
10	(Italy) Bologna (a.e.t.)	1	4	5
8	(Italy) Roma	1	3	4
18	(France) Lille	0	0	0
2	(England) Aston Villa	1	2	3

Quarter-finals
6	(Portugal) Braga	1	4	5
4	(Spain) Real Betis	1	2	3
7	(Germany) SC Freiburg	3	3	6
16	(Spain) Celta Vigo	0	1	1
5	(Portugal) Porto	1	0	1
13	(England) Nottingham Forest	1	1	2
10	(Italy) Bologna	1	0	1
2	(England) Aston Villa	3	4	7

Semi-finals
6	(Portugal) Braga	2	1	3
7	(Germany) SC Freiburg	1	3	4
13	(England) Nottingham Forest	1	0	1
2	(England) Aston Villa	0	4	4

Final
20 May – Istanbul
7	(Germany) SC Freiburg	0
2	(England) Aston Villa	3

=== Knockout phase play-offs ===
The draw for the knockout phase play-offs was held on 30 January 2026, 13:00 CET. The first legs were played on 19 February, and the second legs were played on 26 February 2026.

Team 1	Agg.	Team 2	1st leg	2nd leg
Ludogorets Razgrad (Bulgaria)	2–3	(Hungary) Ferencváros	2–1	0–2
Panathinaikos (Greece)	3–3 (4–3 p)	(Czech Republic) Viktoria Plzeň	2–2	1–1 (a.e.t.)
Dinamo Zagreb (Croatia)	4–6	(Belgium) Genk	1–3	3–3 (a.e.t.)
PAOK (Greece)	1–3	(Spain) Celta Vigo	1–2	0–1
Celtic (Scotland)	2–4	(Germany) VfB Stuttgart	1–4	1–0
Fenerbahçe (Turkey)	2–4	(England) Nottingham Forest	0–3	2–1
Brann (Norway)	0–2	(Italy) Bologna	0–1	0–1
Lille (France)	2–1	(Serbia) Red Star Belgrade	0–1	2–0 (a.e.t.)

=== Round of 16 ===
The draw for the round of 16 was held on 27 February 2026, 13:00 CET. The first legs were played on 12 March, and the second legs were played on 18 and 19 March 2026.

Team 1	Agg.	Team 2	1st leg	2nd leg
Ferencváros (Hungary)	2–4	(Portugal) Braga	2–0	0–4
Panathinaikos (Greece)	1–4	(Spain) Real Betis	1–0	0–4
Genk (Belgium)	2–5	(Germany) SC Freiburg	1–0	1–5
Celta Vigo (Spain)	3–1	(France) Lyon	1–1	2–0
VfB Stuttgart (Germany)	1–4	(Portugal) Porto	1–2	0–2
Nottingham Forest (England)	2–2 (3–0 p)	(Denmark) Midtjylland	0–1	2–1 (a.e.t.)
Bologna (Italy)	5–4	(Italy) Roma	1–1	4–3 (a.e.t.)
Lille (France)	0–3	(England) Aston Villa	0–1	0–2

=== Quarter-finals ===
The first legs were played on 8 and 9 April, and the second legs were played on 16 April 2026.

Team 1	Agg.	Team 2	1st leg	2nd leg
Braga (Portugal)	5–3	(Spain) Real Betis	1–1	4–2
SC Freiburg (Germany)	6–1	(Spain) Celta Vigo	3–0	3–1
Porto (Portugal)	1–2	(England) Nottingham Forest	1–1	0–1
Bologna (Italy)	1–7	(England) Aston Villa	1–3	0–4

=== Semi-finals ===
The first legs were played on 30 April, and the second legs were played on 7 May 2026.

Team 1	Agg.	Team 2	1st leg	2nd leg
Braga (Portugal)	3–4	(Germany) SC Freiburg	2–1	1–3
Nottingham Forest (England)	1–4	(England) Aston Villa	1–0	0–4

=== Final ===
The final was played on 20 May 2026 at the Beşiktaş Stadium in Istanbul. The winner of semi-final 1 was designated as the "home" team for administrative purposes.

20 May 2026
21:00 (22:00 UTC+3)

SC Freiburg (Germany)	0–3	(The Football Association) Aston Villa
	Report	Tielemans 41'; Buendía 45+3'; Rogers 58'

Beşiktaş Stadium, Istanbul
Attendance: 37,324
Referee: François Letexier (France)

== Statistics ==
Statistics exclude qualifying rounds and play-off round.

=== Top goalscorers ===
Rank	Player	Team	Goals	Minutes played
1	(Brazil) Igor Jesus	(England) Nottingham Forest	7	797
1	(Serbia) Petar Stanić	(Bulgaria) Ludogorets Razgrad	7	858
3	(Turkey) Kerem Aktürkoğlu	(Turkey) Fenerbahçe	6	699
3	(Brazil) Antony	(Spain) Real Betis	6	788
5	(Croatia) Dion Drena Beljo	(Croatia) Dinamo Zagreb	5	492
5	(Sweden) Williot Swedberg	(Spain) Celta Vigo	5	585
5	(Morocco) Bilal El Khannouss	(Germany) VfB Stuttgart	5	644
5	(Scotland) John McGinn	(England) Aston Villa	5	716
5	(Italy) Federico Bernardeschi	(Italy) Bologna	5	772
5	(England) Ollie Watkins	(England) Aston Villa	5	913
5	(Italy) Vincenzo Grifo	(Germany) SC Freiburg	5	980

=== Team of the Season ===
The UEFA technical study group selected the following players as the team of the tournament.

Pos.	Player	Team
GK	(Argentina) Emiliano Martínez	(England) Aston Villa
DF	(Spain) Víctor Gómez	(Portugal) Braga
DF	(Germany) Matthias Ginter	(Germany) SC Freiburg
DF	(Brazil) Morato	(England) Nottingham Forest
DF	(Spain) Óscar Mingueza	(Spain) Celta Vigo
MF	(Germany) Maximilian Eggestein	(Germany) SC Freiburg
MF	(Scotland) John McGinn	(England) Aston Villa
MF	(England) Morgan Rogers	(England) Aston Villa
FW	(Brazil) Antony	(Spain) Real Betis
FW	(Brazil) Igor Jesus	(England) Nottingham Forest
FW	(Argentina) Emiliano Buendía	(England) Aston Villa

=== Player of the Season ===
- (England) Morgan Rogers ( (England) Aston Villa)

=== Young Player of the Season ===
- (Switzerland) Johan Manzambi ( (Germany) SC Freiburg)

== See also ==
- 2025–26 UEFA Champions League
- 2025–26 UEFA Conference League
- 2026 UEFA Super Cup
- 2025–26 UEFA Women's Champions League
- 2025–26 UEFA Women's Europa Cup
- 2025–26 UEFA Youth League
