= 2022–23 Sint-Truidense VV season =

Sint-Truidense V.V.
2022–23 season
- Chairman: David Meekers
- Manager: Bernd Hollerbach
- Stadium: Stayen
- Belgian Pro League: 12th
- Belgian Cup: Quarter-finals
- Top goalscorer: League: Gianni Bruno (18); All: Gianni Bruno (20)
Home colours	Away colours

The 2022–23 Sint-Truidense V.V. season was the club's 99th season in existence and the eighth consecutive season in the top flight of Belgian football. In addition to the domestic league, Sint-Truiden participated in the season's edition of the Belgian Cup. The season covers the period from 1 July 2022 to 30 June 2023.

== Players ==
=== First-team squad ===
As of 31 January 2023

Note: Flags indicate national team as defined under FIFA eligibility rules; some limited exceptions apply. Players may hold more than one non-FIFA nationality.

No.	Pos.	Nation	Player
1	GK	BEL	Kenny Steppe
4	DF	JPN	Daiki Hashioka
6	MF	GUI	Mory Konaté
7	FW	BEL	Aboubakary Koita
8	FW	JPN	Daichi Hayashi
9	FW	JPN	Taichi Hara (on loan from Alavés)
11	FW	GER	Fatih Kaya
12	GK	BEL	Jo Coppens
13	MF	GER	Rocco Reitz (on loan from Borussia Mönchengladbach)
14	MF	BEL	Olivier Dumont
16	MF	BEL	Matte Smets
18	DF	POR	Fábio Baptista
19	MF	BEL	Stan Van Dessel

No.	Pos.	Nation	Player
20	DF	GER	Robert Bauer
21	GK	JPN	Daniel Schmidt
22	DF	BEL	Wolke Janssens
26	DF	POR	Jorge Teixeira
27	MF	CMR	Frank Boya (on loan from Antwerp)
30	FW	JPN	Shinji Okazaki
32	FW	BEL	Andréa Librici
35	GK	BEL	Keo Boets
37	DF	GER	Toni Leistner
77	DF	FRA	Eric Bocat
91	FW	BEL	Gianni Bruno (on loan from Gent)
—	FW	UKR	Oleksandr Filippov

=== On loan ===
Note: Flags indicate national team as defined under FIFA eligibility rules; some limited exceptions apply. Players may hold more than one non-FIFA nationality.

No.	Pos.	Nation	Player
—	DF	BEL	Rein Van Helden (on loan at MVV until 30 June 2023)
—	MF	BEL	Jarne Steuckers (on loan at MVV until 30 June 2023)

No.	Pos.	Nation	Player
23	MF	BEL	Mathias Delorge (on loan at Lierse Kempenzonen until 30 June 2023)
—	FW	JPN	Tatsuya Ito (on loan at 1. FC Magdeburg until 30 June 2023)

== Transfers ==
=== In ===
Pos	Player	Transferred from	Fee	Date	Source
FW	(Germany) Fatih Kaya	(Germany) Ingolstadt	Free	25 May 2022	
MF	Olivier Dumont	Standard Liège	Free	8 June 2022	
GK	Jo Coppens	(Germany) MSV Duisburg	Free	21 June 2022	
MF	(Cameroon) Frank Boya	Antwerp	Loan	24 June 2022	
DF	(Portugal) Fábio Baptista	(Portugal) Benfica B	Free	1 July 2022	
DF	(France) Eric Bocat	Mouscron	Free	1 July 2022	
FW	Gianni Bruno	Gent	Loan	11 July 2022	
FW	(Japan) Shinji Okazaki	(Spain) Cartagena	Free	19 August 2022	
FW	(Ukraine) Oleksandr Filippov	(Latvia) Riga	End of loan	21 November 2022	
MF	(Germany) Rocco Reitz	(Germany) Borussia Mönchengladbach	Loan	17 January 2023	
FW	(Japan) Taichi Hara	(Spain) Alavés	Loan	23 January 2023	

=== Out ===
Pos	Player	Transferred to	Fee	Date	Source
DF	Arnaud Dony	Union SG	Free	9 June 2022	
DF	Dimitri Lavalée	(Germany) Mainz 05	End of loan	20 June 2022	
FW	(Democratic Republic of the Congo) Nelson Balongo	(Poland) ŁKS Łódź	Free	24 June 2022	
FW	(Brazil) João Klauss	(Germany) TSG Hoffenheim	End of loan	1 July 2022	
MF	Samuel Ntanda-Lukisa	(Italy) Sampdoria	Undisclosed	12 July 2022	
DF	(Japan) Ko Matsubara	(Japan) Júbilo Iwata	Free	23 July 2022	
DF	(Guinea) Malick Keita	Antwerp	Free	26 July 2022	
MF	Jarne Steuckers	(Netherlands) MVV	Loan	4 August 2022	
DF	Rein Van Helden	(Netherlands) MVV	Loan	13 August 2022	
DF	Dieter Reynders	Olympic Charleroi	Free	23 August 2022	
DF	(Angola) Jonathan Buatu	(France) Valenciennes	Free	2 September 2022	
FW	Steve De Ridder	Deinze	Loan (Note: During his loan, on 6 April 2023, De Ridder signed a two-year permanent contract with Deinze.)	7 September 2022	
MF	Christian Brüls	Zulte Waregem	Undisclosed	5 January 2023	
DF	Ameen Al-Dakhil	(England) Burnley	Undisclosed	13 January 2023	
MF	(Japan) Shinji Kagawa	(Japan) Cerezo Osaka	Free	31 January 2023	
MF	Mathias Delorge	Lierse Kempenzonen	Loan	31 January 2023	

== Pre-season and friendlies ==
Win Draw Loss Fixtures

11 June 2022	Zepperen-Brustem (Belgium)	2–2	(Belgium) Sint-Truiden	Sint-Truiden, Belgium
18:00 CEST (UTC+2)		Report		Stadium: Het Dekken

18 June 2022	Tienen (Belgium)	3–1	(Belgium) Sint-Truiden	Tienen, Belgium
18:00 CEST (UTC+2)		Report		Stadium: Bergéstadion

25 June 2022	Anderlecht (Belgium)	0–1	(Belgium) Sint-Truiden	Brussels, Belgium
17:00 CEST (UTC+2)		Report		Stadium: RSCA Football Academy

29 June 2022	Standard Liège (Belgium)	0–2	(Belgium) Sint-Truiden	Liège, Belgium
13:30 CEST (UTC+2)		Report		Stadium: Stade Maurice Dufrasne

3 July 2022	Dynamo Dresden (Germany)	0–0	(Belgium) Sint-Truiden	Bruckhäusl, Germany
16:00 CEST (UTC+2)		Report		Stadium: Sportplatz Bruckhäusl

6 July 2022	SV Wörgl (Austria)	0–6	(Belgium) Sint-Truiden	Wörgl, Austria
18:00 CEST (UTC+2)		Report		Stadium: Sportzentrum Wörgl

8 July 2022	Viktoria Plzeň (Czech Republic)	1–3	(Belgium) Sint-Truiden	Westendorf, Austria
18:00 CEST (UTC+2)	Mihálik 72'	Report	Al-Dakhil 18', 45'; Hayashi 43'	Stadium: Waldstadion

13 July 2022	Sint-Truiden (Belgium)	0–2	(Belgium) Seraing	Geel, Belgium
18:00 CEST (UTC+2)		Report	Mouandilmadji 19', 42'	Stadium: De Leunen

3 December 2022	Sint-Truiden (Belgium)	3–1	(Belgium) Eupen	Sint-Truiden, Belgium
11:00	Teixeira 23'; Bruno 72', 87'	Report	N'Dri 80'	Stadium: Stayen

13 December 2022	Sint-Truiden (Belgium)	3–0	(Netherlands) Waalwijk	Geel, Belgium
18:30	Konaté 11'; Hayashi 27'; Okazaki 78'	Report		Stadium: De Leunen

23 March 2023	1. FC Köln (Germany)	0–1	(Belgium) Sint-Truiden	Cologne, Germany
18:00 CET (UTC+1)		Report	Boya 34'	Stadium: Franz-Kremer-Stadion

== Competitions ==
=== Overview ===
Competition	First match	Last match	Starting round	Final position	Record							
Competition	First match	Last match	Starting round	Final position	Pld	W	D	L	GF	GA	GD	Win %
Belgian Pro League	23 July 2022	23 April 2023	Matchday 1	12th	34	11	9	14	37	40	−3	32.35
Belgian Cup	9 November 2022	11 January 2023	Sixth round	Quarter-finals	3	2	0	1	5	3	+2	66.67
Total					37	13	9	15	42	43	−1	35.14

Last updated: 23 April 2023
Source: Soccerway

=== Belgian Pro League ===
==== League table ====
Pos	Team	Pld	W	D	L	GF	GA	GD	Pts
10	OH Leuven	34	13	9	12	56	48	+8	48
11	Anderlecht	34	13	7	14	49	46	+3	46
12	Sint-Truiden	34	11	9	14	37	40	−3	42
13	Mechelen	34	11	7	16	49	63	−14	40
14	Kortrijk	34	8	7	19	37	61	−24	31

Source: Jupiler Pro League (in Dutch), Soccerway
Rules for classification: 1) Points; 2) Matches won; 3) Goal difference; 4) Goals scored; 5) Away matches won; 6) Away goal difference; 7) Away goals scored; 8) Play-off.

==== Results summary ====
Overall								Home						Away					
Pld	W	D	L	GF	GA	GD	Pts	W	D	L	GF	GA	GD	W	D	L	GF	GA	GD
26	9	8	9	26	29	−3	35	4	3	6	11	15	−4	5	5	3	15	14	+1

Last updated: 19 February 2023.
Source: Jupiler Pro League

==== Results by round ====
Round	1	2	3	4	5	6	7	8	9	10	11	12	13	14	15	16	17	18	19	20	21	22	23	24	25	26	27	28	29	30	31	32	33	34
Ground	H	A	A	H	A	H	A	H	A	H	A	H	A	H	A	A	H	H	A	A	H	H	A	H	A	H	A	H	A	H	A	H	A	H
Result	D	D	D	L	W	W	D	L	W	L	L	W	L	D	W	W	L	W	D	W	D	L	D	W	L	L	L	D	L	W	L	W	L	L
Position	11	15	17	17	12	9	10	11	9	11	11	10	11	11	9	8	10	10	8	8	7	8	9	8	9	10	11	12	12	12	12	12	12	12

Updated to match(es) played on 23 April 2023. Source: Jupiler Pro League
A = Away; H = Home; W = Win; D = Draw; L = Loss

==== Matches ====
The league fixtures were announced on 22 June 2022.

23 July 2022 1	Sint-Truiden	1–1	Union SG	Sint-Truiden
20:45	Hayashi 21'	Report	Adingra 71'	Stadium: Stayen; Referee: Jonathan Lardot

29 July 2022 2	Gent	1–1	Sint-Truiden	Ghent
14:45 CEST (UTC+2)	Cuypers 12'	Report	Hayashi 82'	Stadium: Ghelamco Arena; Attendance: 9,500; Referee: Jasper Vergoote

6 August 2022 3	Kortrijk	0–0	Sint-Truiden	Kortrijk
18:15		Report		Stadium: Guldensporen Stadion; Referee: Wesli De Cremer

14 August 2022 4	Sint-Truiden	0–3	Anderlecht	Sint-Truiden
13:30		Report	Refaelov 43'; Silva 45+5'; Raman 74'	Stadium: Stayen; Referee: Nicolas Laforge

20 August 2022 5	Oostende	0–1	Sint-Truiden	Ostend
16:00		Report	Leistner 17'	Stadium: Diaz Arena; Referee: Brent Staessens

27 August 2022 6	Sint-Truiden	3–1	Mechelen	Sint-Truiden
20:45	Kagawa 57' (pen.); Bruno 76', 90+5'	Report	Hairemans 53'	Stadium: Stayen; Referee: Wim Smet

3 September 2022 7	Genk	0–0	Sint-Truiden	Genk
16:00 CEST		Report		Stadium: Cegeka Arena; Attendance: 20,000; Referee: Jasper Vergoote

9 September 2022 8	Sint-Truiden	1–2	Standard Liège	Sint-Truiden
20:45	Brüls 63' (pen.)	Report	Drăguș 26'; Leistner 43' (o.g.)	Stadium: Stayen; Referee: Alexandre Boucaut

17 September 2022 9	Zulte Waregem	0–3	Sint-Truiden	Waregem
18:15		Report	Bruno 1', 58' (pen.); Okazaki 50'	Stadium: Elindus Arena; Referee: Brent Staessens

2 October 2022 10	Sint-Truiden	0–1	Eupen	Sint-Truiden
21:00 CEST		Report	N'Dri 76'	Stadium: Stayen; Referee: Lawrence Visser

7 October 2022 11	Antwerp	2–0	Sint-Truiden	Antwerp
20:45	Gerkens 8'; Scott 90+2'	Report		Stadium: Bosuilstadion; Referee: Nicolas Laforge

15 October 2022 12	Sint-Truiden	2–1	Charleroi	Sint-Truiden
18:15 CEST	Kagawa 12'; Boya 70'	Report	Hosseinzadeh 90+2'	Stadium: Stayen; Referee: Wim Smet

19 October 2022 13	Club Brugge	3–0	Sint-Truiden	Bruges
20:45	Vanaken 21'; Yaremchuk 66'; Skov Olsen 71'	Report		Stadium: Jan Breydel Stadium; Referee: Wesli De Cremer

22 October 2022 14	Sint-Truiden	0–0	OH Leuven	Sint-Truiden
18:15		Report		Stadium: Stayen; Referee: Lothar D'hondt

29 October 2022 15	Westerlo	2–3	Sint-Truiden	Westerlo
18:15	De Cuyper 54', 83' (pen.)	Report	Bruno 24', 45+3' (pen.); Hayashi 83'	Stadium: Het Kuipje; Referee: Jasper Vergoote

5 November 2022 16	Seraing	1–2	Sint-Truiden	Seraing
18:15	Vagner 45+2'	Report	Hayashi 77'; Bruno 79'	Stadium: Stade du Pairay; Referee: Jan Boterberg

12 November 2022 17	Sint-Truiden	0–1	Cercle Brugge	Sint-Truiden
18:15 CEST		Report	Ueda 69'	Stadium: Stayen; Referee: Erik Lambrechts

27 December 2022 18	Sint-Truiden	2–0	Zulte Waregem	Sint-Truiden
20:00	Hayashi 28'; Bruno 70'	Report		Stadium: Stayen; Referee: Jonathan Lardot

6 January 2023 19	Standard Liège	1–1	Sint-Truiden	Liège
20:45	Perica 90+2'	Report	Hayashi 61'	Stadium: Stade Maurice Dufrasne; Referee: Kevin Van Damme

14 January 2023 20	Eupen	0–2	Sint-Truiden	Eupen
18:15 CEST		Report	Bruno 44'; Davidson 68' (o.g.)	Stadium: Kehrwegstadion; Referee: Lawrence Visser

19 January 2023 21	Sint-Truiden	1–1	Club Brugge	Sint-Truiden
20:45	Bruno 77'	Report	Janssens 26' (o.g.)	Stadium: Stayen; Referee: Nicolas Laforge

22 January 2023 22	Sint-Truiden	0–3	Gent	Sint-Truiden
21:00 CEST (UTC+2)		Report	Salah 34'; Cuypers 44', 55'	Stadium: Stayen; Referee: Nathan Verboomen

28 January 2023 23	OH Leuven	1–1	Sint-Truiden	Leuven
18:15	Þorsteinsson 53' (pen.)	Report	Hayashi 9'	Stadium: Den Dreef; Referee: Jan Boterberg

4 February 2023 24	Sint-Truiden	1–0	Kortrijk	Sint-Truiden
20:45	Vandenberghe 45+4' (o.g.)	Report		Stadium: Stayen; Referee: Jasper Vergoote

12 February 2023 25	Anderlecht	3–1	Sint-Truiden	Anderlecht
16:00	Raman 66'; Slimani 81'; Dreyer 83'	Report	Bruno 88'	Stadium: Lotto Park; Referee: Bert Put

19 February 2023 26	Sint-Truiden	0–1	Westerlo	Sint-Truiden
19:15		Report	De Cuyper 41' (pen.)	Stadium: Stayen; Referee: Brent Staessens

26 February 2023 27	Charleroi	1–0	Sint-Truiden	Charleroi
19:15 CEST	Zorgane 69'	Report		Stadium: Stade du Pays de Charleroi; Referee: Jan Boterberg

5 March 2023 28	Sint-Truidense	2–2	Genk	Sint-Truiden
13:30 CEST	Konaté 45'; Bruno 77'	Report	Samatta 23', 62'	Stadium: Daio Wasabi Stayen Stadium; Attendance: 9,783; Referee: Erik Lambrechts

11 March 2023 29	Mechelen	1–0	Sint-Truiden	Mechelen
16:00	Hairemans 84' (pen.)	Report		Stadium: Achter de Kazerne; Referee: Wim Smet

18 March 2023 30	Sint-Truiden	2–1	Seraing	Sint-Truiden
18:15	Bruno 24', 83'	Report	Mouandilmadji 88'	Stadium: Stayen; Referee: Wesli De Cremer

2 April 2023 31	Union SG	2–1	Sint-Truiden	Brussels
19:15	Teuma 73'; Puertas 89'	Report	Bruno 57'	Stadium: Joseph Marien Stadium; Referee: Lawrence Visser

9 April 2023 32	Sint-Truiden	5–0	Oostende	Sint-Truiden
19:15	Teixeira 11'; Bruno 43' (pen.), 78'; Reitz 62'; Dumont 88'	Report		Stadium: Stayen; Referee: Wesli De Cremer

15 April 2023 33	Cercle Brugge	3–1	Sint-Truiden	Bruges
18:15 CEST	Ueda 41' (pen.), 45+2'; Denkey 84'	Report	Bruno 68' (pen.)	Stadium: Jan Breydel Stadium; Referee: Wim Smet

23 April 2023 34	Sint-Truiden	0–1	Antwerp	Sint-Truiden
13:30		Report	Balikwisha 48'	Stadium: Stayen; Referee: Jasper Vergoote

=== Belgian Cup ===
9 November 2022 Sixth round	Sint-Truiden	1–0	Meux	Sint-Truiden
20:30 CET	Kaya 83'	Report		Stadium: Stayen

21 December 2022 Seventh round	Club Brugge	1–4	Sint-Truiden	Bruges
20:00 CET	Lang 18'	Report	Brüls 34'; Bruno 63', 89'; Hayashi 70'	Stadium: Jan Breydel Stadium

11 January 2023 Quarter-finals	Zulte Waregem	2–0	Sint-Truiden	Waregem
20:00 CET	Fadera 42'; Vormer 63'	Report		Stadium: Elindus Arena; Referee: Alexandre Boucaut
