= 2023–24 Sint-Truidense VV season =

Sint-Truidense V.V.
2023–24 season
- Manager: Thorsten Fink
- Stadium: Stayen
- Belgian Pro League: 9th
- Belgian Cup: Eighth round
- Top goalscorer: League: Aboubakary Koita (15); All: Aboubakary Koita (15)

The 2023–24 season was Sint-Truidense V.V.'s 100th season in existence and ninth consecutive in the Belgian Pro League. They also competed in the Belgian Cup.

== Players ==
=== First-team squad ===
As of 5 September 2023

Note: Flags indicate national team as defined under FIFA eligibility rules; some limited exceptions apply. Players may hold more than one non-FIFA nationality.

| No. | Pos. | Nation | Player |
|---|---|---|---|
| 1 | GK | JPN | Zion Suzuki (on loan from Urawa Reds) |
| 2 | DF | JPN | Ryoya Ogawa (on loan from FC Tokyo) |
| 4 | DF | JPN | Daiki Hashioka |
| 6 | MF | JPN | Rihito Yamamoto (on loan from Gamba Osaka) |
| 7 | FW | BEL | Aboubakary Koita |
| 8 | MF | JPN | Joel Chima Fujita |
| 11 | FW | GER | Fatih Kaya |
| 12 | GK | BEL | Jo Coppens |
| 13 | MF | JPN | Ryotaro Ito |
| 14 | MF | BEL | Olivier Dumont |
| 15 | FW | USA | Kahveh Zahiroleslam |
| 16 | MF | BEL | Matte Smets |
| 17 | MF | BEL | Mathias Delorge |
| 18 | MF | BEL | Jarne Steuckers |
| 20 | DF | BEL | Rein Van Helden |

| No. | Pos. | Nation | Player |
|---|---|---|---|
| 21 | GK | JPN | Daniel Schmidt |
| 22 | DF | BEL | Wolke Janssens |
| 23 | MF | GHA | Joselpho Barnes |
| 24 | DF | BEL | David Mindombe |
| 25 | DF | BEL | Tristan Teuchy |
| 27 | DF | TOG | Frederic Ananou |
| 30 | FW | JPN | Shinji Okazaki |
| 31 | DF | BEL | Bruno Godeau |
| 32 | MF | BEL | Andréa Librici |
| 33 | DF | BEL | Alouis Diriken |
| 35 | GK | BEL | Siemen Buvé |
| 51 | GK | BEL | Matt Lendfers |
| 53 | FW | BEL | Adam Nhaili |
| 60 | DF | BEL | Robert-Jan Vanwesemael |
| 77 | DF | FRA | Eric Bocat |

=== On loan ===
Note: Flags indicate national team as defined under FIFA eligibility rules; some limited exceptions apply. Players may hold more than one non-FIFA nationality.

| No. | Pos. | Nation | Player |
|---|---|---|---|
| — | FW | JPN | Daichi Hayashi (at 1. FC Nürnberg until 30 June 2024) |

== Transfers ==
=== In ===
| Pos. | Player | Transferred from | Fee | Date | Source |
|---|---|---|---|---|---|
| FW | (Ghana) Joselpho Barnes | (Latvia) Riga FC | €60,000 | 1 July 2023 | |
| DF | (Togo) Frederic Ananou | (Germany) Hansa Rostock | Free | 1 July 2023 | |
| DF | (Belgium) Bruno Godeau | (Belgium) Gent | Free | 1 July 2023 | |
| MF | (Japan) Rihito Yamamoto | (Japan) Gamba Osaka | Loan | 1 July 2023 | |
| FW | (United States) Kahveh Zahiroleslam | (United States) Yale Bulldogs | Free | 4 August 2023 | |

=== Out ===
| Pos. | Player | Transferred to | Fee | Date | Source |
|---|---|---|---|---|---|
| DF | (Germany) Robert Bauer | (Saudi Arabia) Al-Tai | Free | 1 July 2023 | |
| DF | (Germany) Toni Leistner | (Germany) Hertha BSC | Free | 7 July 2023 | |
| MF | (Guinea) Mory Konaté | (Belgium) Mechelen | Free | 13 July 2023 | |

== Pre-season and friendlies ==
Win Draw Loss Fixtures

| 24 June 2023 Friendly | Sint-Truiden (Belgium) | 3–0 | (Belgium) Dessel Sport |
| 19:00 CEST (UTC+2) |

| 28 June 2023 Friendly | Thes Sport Tessenderlo (Belgium) | 0–3 | (Belgium) Sint-Truiden |
| 19:30 CEST (UTC+2) |

| 1 July 2023 Friendly | Westerlo (Belgium) | 2–2 | (Belgium) Sint-Truiden |
| 16:00 CEST (UTC+2) |

| 5 July 2023 Friendly | Patro Eisden (Belgium) | 0–0 | (Belgium) Sint-Truiden |
| 19:00 CEST (UTC+2) |

| 8 July 2023 Friendly | PSV (Netherlands) | 1–2 | (Belgium) Sint-Truiden | Eindhoven |
| 14:30 CEST (UTC+2) | El Ghazi 81' | | Bocat 38' (pen.); Nhaili 90' | Stadium: De Herdgang |

| 14 July 2023 Friendly | Sint-Truiden (Belgium) | 0–2 | (Netherlands) Helmond Sport | Horst |
| 17:00 CEST (UTC+2) | | | Kaars 56'; Lorentzen 70'; Çulhacı (yellow card) 75' | Stadium: Sportpark Ter Horst |

| 15 July 2023 Friendly | Wehen Wiesbaden (Germany) | 1–0 | (Belgium) Sint-Truiden |
| 15:30 CEST (UTC+2) |

| 19 July 2023 Friendly | Lierse Kempenzonen (Belgium) | 1–3 | (Belgium) Sint-Truiden |
| 18:00 CEST (UTC+2) |

| 22 July 2023 Friendly | Sint-Truiden (Belgium) | 2–0 | (Saudi Arabia) Al Taawoun | Dessel |
| 16:00 CEST (UTC+2) | 66'; 70' | | | Stadium: Armand Melis Stadion |

| 2 August 2023 Friendly | RB Leipzig (Germany) | 4–1 | (Belgium) Sint-Truiden |
| 15:00 CEST (UTC+2) |

| 7 September 2023 Friendly | VfL Bochum (Germany) | 1–1 | (Belgium) Sint-Truiden | Bochum |
| 14:00 CEST (UTC+2) | Loosli 88' | | Barnes 47' | Stadium: Leichtathletik-Platz am Vonovia Ruhrstadion |

| 9 October 2023 Friendly | Antwerp (Belgium) | 1–1 | (Belgium) Sint-Truiden |
| 13:00 CEST (UTC+2) | Valencia | Report | Zahiroleslam 80' |

| 12 October 2023 Friendly | Borussia Mönchengladbach (Germany) | 4–1 | (Belgium) Sint-Truiden |
| 13:00 CEST (UTC+2) |

| 14 November 2023 Friendly | Westerlo (Belgium) | 1–3 | (Belgium) Sint-Truiden |
| 13:00 CET (UTC+1) |

== Competitions ==
=== Overall record ===
| Competition | First match | Last match | Starting round | Final position | Record | | | | | | | |
| Competition | First match | Last match | Starting round | Final position | Pld | W | D | L | GF | GA | GD | Win % |
|---|---|---|---|---|---|---|---|---|---|---|---|---|
| Belgian Pro League | 30 July 2023 | 17 March 2024 | Matchday 1 | 9th | 30 | 10 | 10 | 10 | 35 | 46 | −11 | 33.33 |
| Europe Play-offs | 31 March 2024 | 25 May 2024 | Matchday 1 | | 9 | 3 | 4 | 2 | 14 | 13 | +1 | 33.33 |
| Belgian Cup | 31 October 2023 | 6 December 2023 | Seventh round | Eighth round | 2 | 1 | 0 | 1 | 3 | 1 | +2 | 50.00 |
| Total | | | | | 41 | 14 | 14 | 13 | 52 | 60 | −8 | 34.15 |

Source: Soccerway

=== Belgian Pro League ===
==== Regular season ====
| Pos | Team | Pld | W | D | L | GF | GA | GD | Pts | Qualification or relegation |
|---|---|---|---|---|---|---|---|---|---|---|
| 7 | Gent | 30 | 12 | 11 | 7 | 53 | 38 | +15 | 47 | Qualification for the Europe play-offs |
| 8 | Mechelen | 30 | 13 | 6 | 11 | 39 | 34 | +5 | 45 | Qualification for the Europe play-offs |
| 9 | Sint-Truiden | 30 | 10 | 10 | 10 | 35 | 46 | −11 | 40 | Qualification for the Europe play-offs |
| 10 | Standard Liège | 30 | 8 | 10 | 12 | 33 | 41 | −8 | 34 | Qualification for the Europe play-offs |
| 11 | Westerlo | 30 | 7 | 9 | 14 | 42 | 54 | −12 | 30 | Qualification for the Europe play-offs |

Source: Jupiler Pro League (in Dutch), Soccerway
Rules for classification: 1) Points; 2) Matches won; 3) Goal difference; 4) Goals scored; 5) Away matches won; 6) Away goal difference; 7) Away goals scored; 8) Play-off.

==== Results summary ====
| Overall | | | | | | | | Home | | | | | | Away | | | | | |
| Pld | W | D | L | GF | GA | GD | Pts | W | D | L | GF | GA | GD | W | D | L | GF | GA | GD |
|---|---|---|---|---|---|---|---|---|---|---|---|---|---|---|---|---|---|---|---|
| 30 | 10 | 10 | 10 | 35 | 46 | −11 | 40 | 8 | 4 | 3 | 18 | 14 | +4 | 2 | 6 | 7 | 17 | 32 | −15 |

Source: Worldfootball

==== Results by round ====
| Round | 1 | 2 | 3 | 4 | 5 | 6 | 7 | 8 | 9 | 10 | 11 | 12 | 13 | 14 | 15 | 16 | 17 | 18 | 19 | 20 | 21 | 22 | 23 | 24 | 25 | 26 | 27 | 28 | 29 | 30 |
|---|---|---|---|---|---|---|---|---|---|---|---|---|---|---|---|---|---|---|---|---|---|---|---|---|---|---|---|---|---|---|
| Ground | H | A | H | A | H | A | H | A | A | H | A | H | H | A | H | A | H | A | H | A | A | H | H | A | H | A | H | A | A | H |
| Result | W | W | L | D | L | D | W | D | D | L | L | W | D | D | D | W | D | L | W | D | L | D | W | L | W | L | W | L | L | W |
| Position | | | | | | | | | | | | | | | | | | | | | | | | | | | | | | |

Source: Worldfootball
A = Away; H = Home; W = Win; D = Draw; L = Loss

==== Matches ====
The league fixtures were unveiled on 22 June 2023.

| 29 July 2023 1 | Sint-Truiden | 1–0 | Standard Liège | Sint-Truiden |
| 19:15 | Godeau (yellow card) 57'; Koita 86' | Report | Barrett (yellow card) 26' | Stadium: Stayen; Referee: Jasper Vergoote |

| 27 August 2023 | Sint-Truiden | 0–2 | Cercle Brugge | Sint-Truiden |
| 16:00 | | | | Stadium: Stayen |

| 3 September 2023 | Charleroi | 1–1 | Sint-Truiden | Charleroi |
| 19:15 CEST (UTC+2) | | | | Stadium: Stade du Pays de Charleroi |

| 17 September 2023 | Sint-Truiden | 2–0 | Mechelen | Sint-Truiden |
| 19:15 | | | | Stadium: Stayen |

| 24 September 2023 8 | Genk | 3–3 | Sint-Truiden | Genk |
| 13:30 CEST (UTC+2) | | | | Stadium: Cegeka Arena |

| 1 October 2023 9 | Club Brugge | 1–1 | Sint-Truiden | Bruges |
| 18:30 CET (UTC+1) | Olsen 47' | Report | Koita 66' | Stadium: Jan Breydel Stadium; Referee: Nicolas Laforge |

| 8 October 2023 | Sint-Truiden | 0–4 | Union Saint-Gilloise | Sint-Truiden |
| 19:15 | | | | Stadium: Stayen |

| 22 October 2023 | OH Leuven | 4–0 | Sint-Truiden | Leuven |
| 19:15 |

| 27 October 2023 | Sint-Truiden | 2–1 | RWD Molenbeek | Sint-Truiden |
| 20:45 | | | | Stadium: Stayen |

| 3 November 2023 | Sint-Truiden | 1–1 | Eupen | Sint-Truiden |
| 20:45 | | | | Stadium: Stayen |

| 10 November 2023 | Westerlo | 3–3 | Sint-Truiden | Westerlo |
| 20:45 | | | | Stadium: Het Kuipje |

| 24 November 2023 15 | Sint-Truiden | v | Antwerp | Sint-Truiden |
| 20:45 | | | | Stadium: Stayen |

==== Results summary ====
| Overall | | | | | | | | Home | | | | | | Away | | | | | |
| Pld | W | D | L | GF | GA | GD | Pts | W | D | L | GF | GA | GD | W | D | L | GF | GA | GD |
|---|---|---|---|---|---|---|---|---|---|---|---|---|---|---|---|---|---|---|---|
| 9 | 3 | 4 | 2 | 14 | 13 | +1 | 13 | 2 | 2 | 1 | 8 | 7 | +1 | 1 | 2 | 1 | 6 | 6 | 0 |

Last updated: 17 May 2024.
Source: Worldfootball

==== Results by round ====
| Round | 1 | 2 | 3 | 4 | 5 | 6 | 7 | 8 | 9 | 10 |
|---|---|---|---|---|---|---|---|---|---|---|
| Ground | H | A | H | A | H | A | A | H | H | A |
| Result | W | W | D | L | L | D | D | W | D | |
| Position | | | | | | | | | | |

Updated to match(es) played on 17 May 2024. Source: Worldfootball
A = Away; H = Home; W = Win; D = Draw; L = Loss

==== Matches ====
| 31 March 2024 1 | Sint-Truiden | 2–0 | Westerlo | Sint-Truiden |
| 18:30 | Steuckers 8', 84' | Report | Jordanov (yellow card) 76' | Stadium: Stayen; Attendance: 3,895; Referee: Brent Staessens |

| 5 April 2024 2 | Mechelen | 2–3 | Sint-Truiden | Mechelen |
| 20:45 | Garananga (yellow card) 34'; Bates 45+5'; Bassette 56'; Foulon (yellow card) 72' | Report | Ito 67', 89'; Koita 76'; Janssens (yellow card) 78'; Delorge (yellow card) 90+1' | Stadium: AFAS Stadion; Attendance: 9,144; Referee: Sebastian Gishamer (Austria) |

| 12 April 2024 3 | Sint-Truiden | 3–3 | Standard Liège | Sint-Truiden |
| 20:45 | Bocat 3'; Koita (yellow card) 13', (penalty missed) 57'; Ananou (yellow card) 24'; Bertaccini 84', (yellow card) 90+6'; Kaya 88'; Barnes (yellow card) 89' | Report | Kanga 9', 81', (yellow card) 89'; Laifis (yellow card) 55'; Balikwisha 59'; Price (yellow card) 65'; Yeboah (yellow card) 72' | Stadium: Stayen; Attendance: 5,956; Referee: Wesli De Cremer |

| 20 April 2024 4 | OH Leuven | 1–0 | Sint-Truiden | Leuven |
| 16:00 | Sagrado (yellow card) 59'; Maziz 83' | Report | Dumont (yellow card) 41'; Janssens (yellow card) 80' | Stadium: Den Dreef; Referee: Brent Staessens |

| 23 April 2024 5 | Sint-Truiden | 0–2 | Gent | Sint-Truiden |
| 20:30 | Koita (penalty missed) 12'; Bocat (yellow card) 84'; Kaya (yellow card) 90' | Report | De Sart (yellow card) 9'; Tissoudali 44'; Mitrović 85' | Stadium: Stayen; Referee: Simon Bourdeaud'hui |

| 27 April 2024 6 | Standard Liège | 1–1 | Sint-Truiden | Liège |
| 18:15 | Panzo 63' | Report | Ogawa 13'; Zahiroleslam (yellow card) 23'; Delorge (yellow card) 37' | Stadium: Stade Maurice Dufrasne; Referee: Jan Boterberg |

| 3 May 2024 7 | Westerlo | 2–2 | Sint-Truiden | Westerlo |
| 20:45 | Bos 32'; Reynolds (yellow card) 42'; Stassin 47'; Sydorchuk (yellow card) 68' | Report | Ito 8'; Ananou (yellow card) 21'; Godeau (yellow card) 64'; Bertaccini 69' | Stadium: Het Kuipje; Referee: Simon Bourdeaud'Hui |

| 12 May 2024 8 | Sint-Truiden | 2–1 | Mechelen | Sint-Truiden |
| 16:00 | Bertaccini 17', 39'; Janssens (yellow card) 90' | Report | Konaté 9' | Stadium: Stayen; Referee: Ken Vermeiren |

| 17 May 2024 9 | Sint-Truiden | 1–1 | OH Leuven | Sint-Truiden |
| 20:45 | Bocat (yellow card) 37'; Kaya 66'; Smets (yellow card) 87' | Report | Dagur Þorsteinsson 74' | Stadium: Stayen; Referee: Arthur Denil |

| 25 May 2024 10 | Gent | – | Sint-Truiden | Gent |
| 20:30 | | Report | | Stadium: Planet Group Arena |

=== Belgian Cup ===
| 31 October 2023 Seventh round | Sint-Truiden | 3–0 (a.e.t.) | Francs Borains | Sint-Truiden |
| 20:30 CET (UTC+1) | Zahiroleslam 93'; Okazaki 111'; Steuckers 120+3' (pen.) | Report | | Stadium: Stayen; Referee: Massimiliano Ledda |

| 6 December 2023 Eighth round | Sint-Truiden | 0–1 | Gent | Sint-Truiden |
| 20:30 CET (UTC+1) | | Report | Cuypers 38' | Stadium: Stayen; Referee: Erik Lambrechts |
