= 2024–25 Sint-Truidense VV season =

Sint-Truidense V.V.
2024–25 season
- Manager: Christian Lattanzio (until 3 September); Felice Mazzù (5 September–10 April); Wouter Vrancken (from 15 April)
- Stadium: Stayen
- Belgian Pro League: 1th
- Belgian Cup: Quarter-finals
- Top goalscorer: League: Adriano Bertaccini (12); All: Adriano Bertaccini (12)

The 2024–25 season is the 101st season in the history of Sint-Truidense V.V., and the club's 10th consecutive season in Belgian Pro League. In addition to the domestic league, the team participated in the Belgian Cup, reaching the quarter-finals.

== Squad ==
As of 4 February 2025

Note: Flags indicate national team as defined under FIFA eligibility rules; some limited exceptions apply. Players may hold more than one non-FIFA nationality.

No.	Pos.	Nation	Player
2	DF	JPN	Ryoya Ogawa
4	DF	ALG	Zineddine Belaïd
5	DF	JPN	Shogo Taniguchi
6	MF	JPN	Rihito Yamamoto
7	MF	ALG	Billal Brahimi (on loan from Nice)
8	MF	JPN	Joel Chima Fujita
9	FW	URU	Andrés Ferrari (on loan from Villarreal)
10	FW	CMR	Didier Lamkel Zé
11	MF	ARG	Isaías Delpupo
12	GK	BEL	Jo Coppens
13	MF	JPN	Ryotaro Ito
14	MF	BEL	Olivier Dumont
15	FW	USA	Kahveh Zahiroleslam
16	GK	JPN	Leo Kokubo
18	DF	NOR	Simen Juklerød

No.	Pos.	Nation	Player
19	DF	BEL	Louis Patris (on loan from Anderlecht)
20	DF	BEL	Rein Van Helden
22	DF	BEL	Wolke Janssens
23	FW	GHA	Joselpho Barnes
26	DF	MKD	Visar Musliu
31	DF	BEL	Bruno Godeau (captain)
34	DF	BEL	Hugo Lambotte
37	MF	BEL	Arthur Alexis
41	FW	JPN	Hiiro Komori (on loan from JEF United Chiba)
51	GK	BEL	Matt Lendfers
53	FW	BEL	Adam Nhaili
60	DF	BEL	Robert-Jan Vanwesemael
91	FW	BEL	Adriano Bertaccini
94	MF	MAD	Loïc Lapoussin

== Transfers ==
=== In ===
Pos.	Player	Transferred from	Fee	Date	Source
GK	(Japan) Leo Kokubo	(Portugal) Benfica	Undisclosed	11 July 2024	
DF	(Algeria) Zineddine Belaïd	(Algeria) USM Alger		15 July 2024	
DF	(Japan) Shogo Taniguchi	(Qatar) Al-Rayyan	Free	19 July 2024	

=== Out ===
Pos.	Player	Transferred to	Fee	Date	Source
FW	(Mauritania) Aboubakary Koïta	(Greece) AEK Athens	€3,600,000	13 July 2024	
GK	(Japan) Zion Suzuki	(Italy) Parma	€7,500,000	15 July 2024	
MF	(Belgium) Mathias Delorge	(Belgium) Gent	€3,500,000	24 July 2024	

== Friendlies ==
=== Pre-season ===
29 June 2024 Friendly	KVK Tienen (Belgium)	0–6	(Belgium) Sint-Truiden
16:00

3 July 2024 Friendly	Patro Eisden (Belgium)	3–4	(Belgium) Sint-Truiden
19:00

6 July 2024 Friendly	FC Twente (Netherlands)	2–2	(Belgium) Sint-Truiden	Goor
14:00				Stadium: Sportpark Heeckeren

9 July 2024 Friendly	Ajax (Netherlands)	4–0	(Belgium) Sint-Truiden
18:00

12 July 2024 Friendly	FC Utrecht (Netherlands)	v	(Belgium) Sint-Truiden
15:00

== Competitions ==
=== Overall record ===
Competition	First match	Last match	Starting round	Record							
Competition	First match	Last match	Starting round	Pld	W	D	L	GF	GA	GD	Win %
Belgian Pro League regular season	27 July 2024	14–16 March 2025	Matchday 1	7	1	3	3	8	16	−8	14.29
Belgian Cup				0	0	0	0	0	0	+0	—
Total				7	1	3	3	8	16	−8	14.29

Last updated: 15 September 2024
Source: Soccerway

=== Belgian Pro League ===
==== League table ====
Pos	Team	Pld	W	D	L	GF	GA	GD	Pts	Qualification or relegation
12	Dender EH	30	8	8	14	33	51	−18	32	Qualification for the Europe play-offs
13	Cercle Brugge	30	7	11	12	29	44	−15	32	Qualification for the Relegation play-offs
14	Sint-Truiden	30	7	10	13	41	56	−15	31	Qualification for the Relegation play-offs
15	Kortrijk	30	7	5	18	28	55	−27	26	Qualification for the Relegation play-offs
16	Beerschot	30	3	9	18	26	60	−34	18	Qualification for the Relegation play-offs

Source: Jupiler Pro League (in Dutch), Soccerway
Rules for classification: 1) Points; 2) Matches won; 3) Goal difference; 4) Goals scored; 5) Away matches won; 6) Away goal difference; 7) Away goals scored; 8) Play-off.

Pos	Team	Pld	W	D	L	GF	GA	GD	Pts	Qualification or relegation	USG	CLU	GNK	AND	ANT	GNT
1	Union SG (C)	10	9	1	0	22	3	+19	56	Qualification for the Champions League league phase		0–0	1–0	2–0	5–1	3–1
2	Club Brugge	10	7	2	1	21	6	+15	53	Qualification for the Champions League third qualifying round	0–1		1–0	2–0	1–1	4–1
3	Genk	10	4	1	5	14	11	+3	47	Qualification for the Europa League play-off round (Note: Club Brugge won the 2024–25 Belgian Cup and qualified for the Champions League through finishing second, the Europa League play-off round berth was therefore transferred to regular season winners Genk.)	1–2	0–2		2–1	0–1	4–0
4	Anderlecht	10	3	1	6	12	13	−1	36	Qualification for the Europa League second qualifying round	0–1	1–3	1–2		0–0	5–0
5	Antwerp	10	2	3	5	10	18	−8	32	Qualification for the European competition play-off	0–4	2–3	1–1	1–3		0–1
6	Gent	10	1	0	9	4	32	−28	26		0–3	0–5	1–4	0–1	0–3	

Source: Jupiler Pro League (in Dutch), Soccerway
Legend: Blue = home team win; Yellow = draw; Red = away team win.
Rules for classification: 1) Points; 2) Points without (possible) half points added due to rounding; 3) Regular season finishing position.
(C) Champions
Notes:

Pos	Team	Pld	W	D	L	GF	GA	GD	Pts	Qualification or relegation	CHA	WES	MEC	DEN	STA	OHL
1	Charleroi (O)	10	6	3	1	19	10	+9	40	Qualification for the European competition play-off		4–3	3–0	4–1	1–0	2–1
2	Westerlo	10	3	5	2	19	16	+3	33		2–2		2–2	4–2	0–0	2–2
3	Mechelen	10	2	6	2	17	17	0	31		1–1	2–3		5–2	0–0	1–1
4	Dender EH	10	3	4	3	20	21	−1	29		2–1	1–0	2–2		1–1	5–0
5	Standard Liège	10	0	7	3	5	8	−3	27		0–1	1–1	2–2	0–0		0–1
6	OH Leuven	10	1	5	4	11	19	−8	27		0–0	0–2	1–2	4–4	1–1	

Source: Jupiler Pro League (in Dutch), Soccerway
Legend: Blue = home team win; Yellow = draw; Red = away team win.
Rules for classification: 1) Points; 2) Points without (possible) half points added due to rounding; 3) Regular season finishing position.
(O) Play-off winners

Pos	Team	Pld	W	D	L	GF	GA	GD	Pts	Qualification or relegation	STR	CER	KOR	BEE
1	Sint-Truiden	6	3	1	2	9	10	−1	41			3–1	0–3	2–1
2	Cercle Brugge (O)	6	2	1	3	10	13	−3	39	Qualification for the promotion/relegation play-offs	3–1		0–2	2–1
3	Kortrijk (R)	6	3	2	1	12	8	+4	37	Relegation to Challenger Pro League	2–2	2–2		3–2
4	Beerschot (R)	6	2	0	4	10	10	0	24	Relegation to Challenger Pro League	0–1	4–2	2–0	

Source: Jupiler Pro League (in Dutch), Soccerway
Legend: Blue = home team win; Yellow = draw; Red = away team win.
Rules for classification: 1) Points; 2) Regular season finishing position.
(O) Play-off winners; (R) Relegated

==== Results summary ====
Overall								Home						Away					
Pld	W	D	L	GF	GA	GD	Pts	W	D	L	GF	GA	GD	W	D	L	GF	GA	GD
7	1	3	3	8	16	−8	6	1	2	1	6	8	−2	0	1	2	2	8	−6

Last updated: 15 September 2024.

==== Results by round ====
Round	1	2	3	4	5	6	7	8
Ground	A	H	A	H	H	A	H	A
Result	L	L	L	D	D	D	W	
Position	13	15	16	16	15	15	14	

Updated to match(es) played on 15 September 2024. Source:
A = Away; H = Home; W = Win; D = Draw; L = Loss

==== Matches ====
The match schedule was released on 11 June 2024.

27 July 2024 1	Anderlecht	1–0	Sint-Truiden	Anderlecht
20:45	Stroeykens 90+2'			Stadium: Constant Vanden Stock Stadium; Attendance: 0 Referee: Jasper Vergoote
Note: The match was held behind closed doors as a result of a probationary sanction imposed due to unsportsmanlike behavior exhibited by fans from both teams during a match hosted by Standard in October 2022, as well as subsequent misconduct during a cup match against Standard last December.

3 August 2024 2	Sint-Truiden	1–4	Charleroi	Sint-Truiden
20:45				Stadium: Stayen

8 February 2025 25	Dender	2–1	Sint-Truiden

15 February 2025 26	Sint-Truiden	2–2	Club Brugge

21 February 2025 27	Mechelen	1–1	Sint-Truiden

1 March 2025 28	Sint-Truiden	4–2	Kortrijk

7 March 2025 29	Sint-Truiden	2–0	Beerschot

16 March 2025 30	OH Leuven	3–2	Sint-Truiden

==== Relegation play-offs ====
Pos	Team	Pld	W	D	L	GF	GA	GD	Pts	Qualification or relegation	STR	CER	KOR	BEE
1	Sint-Truiden	6	3	1	2	9	10	−1	41			3–1	0–3	2–1
2	Cercle Brugge (O)	6	2	1	3	10	13	−3	39	Qualification for the promotion/relegation play-offs	3–1		0–2	2–1
3	Kortrijk (R)	6	3	2	1	12	8	+4	37	Relegation to Challenger Pro League	2–2	2–2		3–2
4	Beerschot (R)	6	2	0	4	10	10	0	24	Relegation to Challenger Pro League	0–1	4–2	2–0	

Source: Jupiler Pro League (in Dutch), Soccerway
Legend: Blue = home team win; Yellow = draw; Red = away team win.
Rules for classification: 1) Points; 2) Regular season finishing position.
(O) Play-off winners; (R) Relegated

29 March 2025 1	Beerschot	0–1	Sint-Truiden

6 April 2025 2	Sint-Truiden	0–3	Kortrijk

12 April 2025 3	Sint-Truiden	3–1	Cercle Brugge

26 April 2025 4	Cercle Brugge	3–1	Sint-Truiden

4 May 2025 5	Sint-Truiden	2–1	Beerschot

10 May 2025 6	Kortrijk	2–2	Sint-Truiden
