= 2021–22 Sint-Truidense VV season =

Sint-Truidense V.V.
2021–22 season
- Owner: DMM.com
- Chairman: David Meekers
- Manager: Peter Maes
- Stadium: Stayen
- Belgian First Division A: 9th
- Belgian Cup: Sixth round
- Top goalscorer: League: Taichi Hara (8); All: Taichi Hara (8)
| Home colours | Away colours | Third colours |

The 2021–22 season was the 98th season in the existence of Sint-Truidense V.V. and the club's seventh consecutive season in the top flight of Belgian football. In addition to the domestic league, Sint-Truidense V.V. participated in this season's edition of the Belgian Cup.

== Players ==
=== First-team squad ===
Note: Flags indicate national team as defined under FIFA eligibility rules; some limited exceptions apply. Players may hold more than one non-FIFA nationality.

| No. | Pos. | Nation | Player |
|---|---|---|---|
| 1 | GK | BEL | Kenny Steppe |
| 2 | DF | JPN | Ko Matsubara |
| 3 | DF | BEL | Ameen Al-Dakhil |
| 4 | DF | JPN | Daiki Hashioka |
| 6 | MF | GUI | Mory Konaté |
| 8 | MF | GER | Rocco Reitz (on loan from Mönchengladbach) |
| 9 | FW | BRA | João Klauss (on loan from Hoffenheim) |
| 10 | MF | JPN | Shinji Kagawa |
| 14 | FW | BEL | Aboubakary Koita |
| 15 | FW | JPN | Daichi Hayashi |
| 16 | FW | BEL | Steve De Ridder (captain) |
| 18 | FW | JPN | Taichi Hara (on loan from Alavés) |
| 19 | MF | BEL | Stan Van Dessel |
| 20 | MF | GER | Robert Bauer |

| No. | Pos. | Nation | Player |
|---|---|---|---|
| 21 | GK | JPN | Daniel Schmidt |
| 22 | FW | BEL | Wolke Janssens |
| 26 | DF | POR | Jorge Teixeira |
| 27 | DF | BEL | Dimitri Lavalée (on loan from Mainz) |
| 30 | FW | COD | Nelson Balongo |
| 33 | GK | ITA | Alessandro Russo (on loan from Sassuolo) |
| 35 | GK | BEL | Wim Vanmarsenille |
| 37 | DF | GER | Toni Leistner |
| 40 | DF | NGR | Junior Pius (on loan from Antwerp) |
| 44 | MF | BEL | Christian Brüls |
| 61 | MF | BEL | Jarne Steuckers |
| 66 | MF | BEL | Mathias Delorge |
| 85 | DF | BEL | Arnaud Dony |

=== On loan ===
Note: Flags indicate national team as defined under FIFA eligibility rules; some limited exceptions apply. Players may hold more than one non-FIFA nationality.

| No. | Pos. | Nation | Player |
|---|---|---|---|
| — | DF | ANG | Jonathan Buatu (on loan at Eyüpspor until 30 June 2022) |
| — | DF | NZL | Liberato Cacace (on loan at Empoli until 30 June 2022) |
| — | MF | BRA | Jhonny Lucas (on loan at Londrina until 30 June 2022) |

| No. | Pos. | Nation | Player |
|---|---|---|---|
| — | FW | UKR | Oleksandr Filippov (on loan at Riga until 31 December 2022) |
| — | FW | JPN | Tatsuya Ito (on loan at 1. FC Magdeburg until 30 June 2022) |

== Pre-season and friendlies ==
Win Draw Loss

| 18 June 2021 Friendly | Zepperen-Brustem (Belgium) | 1–4 | (Belgium) Sint-Truiden | Sint-Truiden, Belgium |
| 19:30 CEST (UTC+2) | | | | Stadium: Het Dekken |

| 19 June 2021 Friendly | Berg en Dal (Belgium) | 1–4 | (Belgium) Sint-Truiden | Meerhout, Belgium |
| 18:00 CEST (UTC+2) | | | | Stadium: Kattenstadion |

| 25 June 2021 Friendly | Anderlecht (Belgium) | 1–1 | (Belgium) Sint-Truiden | Brussels, Belgium |
| 12:00 CEST (UTC+2) | Amuzu 14' | | Mboyo 37' | Stadium: RSCA Football Academy |

| 2 July 2021 Friendly | KV Mechelen (Belgium) | Cancelled | (Belgium) Sint-Truiden | Belgium |
| 14:00 CEST (UTC+2) |

| 10 July 2021 Friendly | Sint-Truiden (Belgium) | 2–1 | (Belgium) Westerlo | Sint-Truiden, Belgium |
| 16:00 CEST (UTC+2) | | | | Stadium: Stayen |

| 17 July 2021 Friendly | Eupen (Belgium) | 1–1 | (Belgium) Sint-Truiden | Belgium |
| 15:00 CEST (UTC+2) | 39' | | Brüls 89' |

| 2 September 2021 Friendly | Fortuna Düsseldorf (Germany) | 1–0 | (Belgium) Sint-Truiden | Düsseldorf, Germany |
| 14:00 CEST (UTC+2) | Kownacki 63' | | | Stadium: Paul-Janes-Stadion |

| 8 September 2021 Friendly | Westerlo (Belgium) | 0–5 | (Belgium) Sint-Truiden | Westerlo, Belgium |
| 14:30 CEST (UTC+2) | | Report | | Stadium: Het Kuipje |

== Competitions ==
=== Overall record ===
| Competition | First match | Last match | Starting round | Final position | Record | | | | | | | |
| Competition | First match | Last match | Starting round | Final position | Pld | W | D | L | GF | GA | GD | Win % |
|---|---|---|---|---|---|---|---|---|---|---|---|---|
| Belgian First Division A | 25 July 2021 | 10 April 2022 | Matchday 1 | 9th | 34 | 15 | 6 | 13 | 42 | 40 | +2 | 44.12 |
| Belgian Cup | 27 October 2021 | | Sixth round | Sixth round | 1 | 0 | 0 | 1 | 2 | 3 | −1 | 0.00 |
| Total | | | | | 35 | 15 | 6 | 14 | 44 | 43 | +1 | 42.86 |

Source: Soccerway

=== First Division A ===
==== League table ====
| Pos | Team | Pld | W | D | L | GF | GA | GD | Pts | Qualification or relegation |
|---|---|---|---|---|---|---|---|---|---|---|
| 7 | Mechelen | 34 | 15 | 7 | 12 | 57 | 61 | −4 | 52 | Qualification for the Play-offs II |
| 8 | Genk | 34 | 15 | 6 | 13 | 66 | 47 | +19 | 51 | Qualification for the Play-offs II |
| 9 | Sint-Truiden | 34 | 15 | 6 | 13 | 42 | 40 | +2 | 51 | |
| 10 | Cercle Brugge | 34 | 12 | 9 | 13 | 49 | 46 | +3 | 45 | |
| 11 | OH Leuven | 34 | 10 | 11 | 13 | 47 | 58 | −11 | 41 | |

Source: Jupiler Pro League (in Dutch), Soccerway
Rules for classification: 1) Points; 2) Matches won; 3) Goal difference; 4) Goals scored; 5) Away matches won; 6) Away goal difference; 7) Away goals scored; 8) Play-off.

==== Results summary ====
| Overall | | | | | | | | Home | | | | | | Away | | | | | |
| Pld | W | D | L | GF | GA | GD | Pts | W | D | L | GF | GA | GD | W | D | L | GF | GA | GD |
|---|---|---|---|---|---|---|---|---|---|---|---|---|---|---|---|---|---|---|---|
| 34 | 15 | 6 | 13 | 42 | 40 | +2 | 51 | 7 | 3 | 7 | 26 | 23 | +3 | 8 | 3 | 6 | 16 | 17 | −1 |

Source: Jupiler Pro League

==== Results by round ====
| Round | 1 | 2 | 3 | 4 | 5 | 6 | 7 | 8 | 9 | 10 | 11 | 12 | 13 | 14 | 15 | 16 | 17 | 18 | 19 | 20 | 21 | 22 | 23 | 24 | 25 | 26 | 27 | 28 | 29 | 30 | 31 | 32 | 33 | 34 |
|---|---|---|---|---|---|---|---|---|---|---|---|---|---|---|---|---|---|---|---|---|---|---|---|---|---|---|---|---|---|---|---|---|---|---|
| Ground | H | A | H | A | H | A | A | H | A | H | H | A | H | A | H | A | H | H | A | A | H | A | H | A | H | A | A | H | A | H | A | H | A | H |
| Result | W | D | L | L | L | W | W | L | W | D | D | L | L | W | W | L | L | L | L | L | W | L | W | D | L | W | W | W | D | D | W | W | W | W |
| Position | 5 | 6 | 11 | 13 | 16 | 14 | 9 | 11 | 8 | 9 | 11 | 12 | 13 | 11 | 10 | 11 | 11 | 12 | 13 | 15 | 13 | 13 | 11 | 11 | 11 | 12 | 11 | 10 | 10 | 10 | 10 | 9 | 9 | 9 |

Source: Jupiler Pro League
A = Away; H = Home; W = Win; D = Draw; L = Loss

==== Matches ====
The league fixtures were announced on 8 June 2021.

| 25 July 2021 1 | Sint-Truiden | 2–1 | Gent | Sint-Truiden |
| 21:00 CEST (UTC+2) | Mboyo 12'; Van Dessel (yellow card) 60'; Brüls 67'; Janssens (yellow card) 80' | Report | Hanche-Olsen 2', (yellow card) 66' | Stadium: Stayen; Attendance: 2,000; Referee: Jan Boterberg |

| 31 July 2021 2 | Charleroi | 0–0 | Sint-Truiden | Charleroi |
| 16:15 CEST (UTC+2) | | Report | | Stadium: Stade du Pays de Charleroi; Attendance: 4,648; Referee: Lawrence Visser |

| 7 August 2021 3 | Sint-Truiden | 1–3 | Zulte Waregem | Sint-Truiden |
| 16:15 CEST (UTC+2) | | Report | | Stadium: Stayen; Attendance: 2,700; Referee: Lothar D'hondt |

| 14 August 2021 4 | Eupen | 2–1 | Sint-Truiden | Eupen |
| 16:15 CEST (UTC+2) | | Report | | Stadium: Kehrwegstadion; Attendance: 1,335; Referee: Bram Van Driessche |

| 21 August 2021 5 | Sint-Truiden | 0–2 | Kortrijk | Sint-Truiden |
| 20:45 CEST (UTC+2) | | Report | Selemani 1'; Guèye 90+3' | Stadium: Stayen; Attendance: 2,243; Referee: Kevin Van Damme |

| 28 August 2021 6 | Cercle Brugge | 0–1 | Sint-Truiden | Bruges |
| 18:30 CEST (UTC+2) | | Report | Hayashi 7' | Stadium: Jan Breydel Stadium; Attendance: 2,200; Referee: Jan Boterberg |

| 13 September 2021 7 | Beerschot | 0–1 | Sint-Truiden | Antwerp |
| 16:30 CEST (UTC+2) | | Report | | Stadium: Olympic Stadium; Attendance: 8,500; Referee: Bert Put |

| 19 September 2021 8 | Sint-Truiden | 1–2 | Genk | Sint-Truiden |
| 13:30 CEST (UTC+2) | | Report | | Stadium: Stayen; Attendance: 6,000; Referee: Lothar D'hondt |

| 25 September 2021 9 | Standard Liège | 1–2 | Sint-Truiden | Liège |
| 18:30 CEST (UTC+2) | | Report | | Stadium: Stade Maurice Dufrasne; Attendance: 20,456; Referee: Wim Smet |

| 2 October 2021 10 | Sint-Truiden | 1–1 | Oostende | Sint-Truiden |
| 18:30 CEST (UTC+2) | | Report | | Stadium: Stayen; Attendance: 2,500; Referee: Jan Boterberg |

| 17 October 2021 11 | Sint-Truiden | 2–2 | Anderlecht | Sint-Truiden |
| CEST (UTC+2) | | Report | | Stadium: Stayen; Attendance: 6,500; Referee: Alexandre Boucaut |

| 24 October 2021 12 | OH Leuven | 4–1 | Sint-Truiden | Leuven |
| 20:45 CEST (UTC+2) | | Report | | Stadium: Den Dreef; Attendance: 5,100; Referee: Nicolas Laforge |

| 30 October 2021 13 | Sint-Truiden | 1–2 | Club Brugge | Sint-Truiden |
| 20:45 CEST (UTC+2) | Bauer 23' | Report | Dost 1', 49' | Stadium: Stayen; Attendance: 6,000; Referee: Bram Van Driessche |

| 6 November 2021 14 | Mechelen | 0–1 | Sint-Truiden | Mechelen |
| CET (UTC+1) | | Report | | Stadium: Achter de Kazerne; Attendance: 14,668; Referee: Jan Boterberg |

| 21 November 2021 15 | Sint-Truiden | 2–1 | Antwerp | Sint-Truiden |
| 16:00 CET (UTC+1) | Hayashi 31'; Koita 37'; Konaté (yellow card) 39'; Leistner (yellow card) 84' | Report | Samatta 82' | Stadium: Stayen; Attendance: 5,370; Referee: Erik Lambrechts |

| 27 November 2021 16 | Seraing | 2–0 | Sint-Truiden | Seraing |
| 20:45 CET (UTC+1) | Jallow 5'; Mikautadze 57' | Report | | Stadium: Stade du Pairay; Attendance: 1,200; Referee: Lothar D'hondt |

| 4 December 2021 17 | Sint-Truiden | 1–2 | Union Saint-Gilloise | Sint-Truiden |
| 20:45 CET (UTC+1) | Brüls 63'; Suzuki (yellow card) 65'; Leistner (yellow card) 77' | Report | Nieuwkoop (yellow card) 11'; Undav 32', 73'; Burgess (yellow card) 65' | Stadium: Stayen; Attendance: 4,238; Referee: Jasper Vergoote |

| 11 December 2021 18 | Sint-Truiden | 1–2 | Cercle Brugge | Sint-Truiden |
| 18:30 CET (UTC+1) | Brüls 58' (pen.) | Report | Utkus 50'; Matondo 75', (yellow card) 73' (yellow-red card) 90+4' | Stadium: Stayen; Attendance: 3,004; Referee: Kevin Van Damme |

| 14 December 2021 19 | Anderlecht | 2–0 | Sint-Truiden | Anderlecht |
| CET (UTC+1) | Refaelov 60'; Ashimeru 90+5' | Report | | Stadium: Constant Vanden Stock Stadium; Attendance: 13,500; Referee: Jonathan Lardot |

| 18 December 2021 20 | Gent | 2–1 | Sint-Truiden | Ghent |
| 20:45 CET (UTC+1) | Depoitre 27'; Tissoudali 64' | Report | Hara 85' | Stadium: Ghelamco Arena; Attendance: 16,485; Referee: Lothar D'hondt |

| 27 December 2021 21 | Sint-Truiden | 2–0 | Eupen | Sint-Truiden |
| 21:00 CEST (UTC+2) | | Report | | Stadium: Stayen; Attendance: 0 Referee: Bram Van Driessche |

| 15 January 2022 22 | Club Brugge | 2–0 | Sint-Truiden | Bruges |
| 20:45 CET (UTC+1) | De Ketelaere 29'; Dost 64' | Report | | Stadium: Jan Breydel Stadium; Attendance: 0 Referee: Erik Lambrechts |

| 22 January 2022 23 | Sint-Truiden | 3–1 | Seraing | Sint-Truiden |
| 20:45 CET (UTC+1) | | Report | | Stadium: Stayen; Attendance: 0 Referee: Arthur Denil |

| 25 January 2022 24 | Antwerp | 1–1 | Sint-Truiden | Antwerp |
| 18:45 CET (UTC+1) | Balikwisha 32' | Report | Hara (yellow card) 47', (goal) 54'; Cacace (yellow card) 50' | Stadium: Bosuilstadion; Attendance: 0 Referee: Kevin Van Damme |

| 28 January 2022 25 | Sint-Truiden | 0–1 | Charleroi | Sint-Truiden |
| 20:45 CET (UTC+1) | | Report | | Stadium: Stayen; Attendance: 2,000; Referee: Jonathan Lardot |

| 5 February 2022 26 | Kortrijk | 1–3 | Sint-Truiden | Kortrijk |
| CET (UTC+1) | | Report | | Stadium: Guldensporen Stadion; Attendance: 4,176; Referee: Erik Lambrechts |

| 13 February 2022 27 | Union Saint-Gilloise | 0–1 | Sint-Truiden | Brussels |
| 20:00 CET (UTC+1) | | Report | Brüls 54' (pen.) | Stadium: Stade Joseph Marien; Attendance: 7,491; Referee: Bert Put |

| 20 February 2022 28 | Sint-Truiden | 2–0 | OH Leuven | Sint-Truiden |
| 20:45 CET (UTC+1) | | Report | | Stadium: Stayen; Attendance: 2,471; Referee: Jasper Vergoote |

| 26 February 2022 29 | Oostende | 0–0 | Sint-Truiden | Ostend |
| 16:15 CET (UTC+1) | | Report | | Stadium: Versluys Arena; Attendance: 3,360; Referee: Kevin Van Damme |

| 4 March 2022 30 | Sint-Truiden | 1–1 | Mechelen | Sint-Truiden |
| 20:45 CET (UTC+1) | | Report | | Stadium: Stayen; Attendance: 4,628; Referee: Bert Put |

| 13 March 2022 31 | Genk | 0–1 | Sint-Truiden | Genk |
| 16:00 CET (UTC+1) | | Report | | Stadium: Luminus Arena; Attendance: 19,436; Referee: Christof Dierick |

| 20 March 2022 32 | Sint-Truiden | 3–2 | Beerschot | Sint-Truiden |
| 16:00 CET (UTC+1) | | Report | | Stadium: Stayen; Attendance: 2,000; Referee: Wesli De Cremer |

| 2 April 2022 33 | Zulte Waregem | 0–2 | Sint-Truiden | Waregem |
| 16:00 CEST (UTC+2) | | Report | | Stadium: Regenboogstadion; Attendance: 8,763; Referee: Lawrence Visser |

| 10 April 2022 34 | Sint-Truiden | 3–0 | Standard Liège | Sint-Truiden |
| 18:30 CEST (UTC+2) | | Report | | Stadium: Stayen; Attendance: 10,076; Referee: Lothar D'hondt |

=== Belgian Cup ===
| 27 October 2021 Sixth round | Seraing | 3–2 (a.e.t.) | Sint-Truiden | Seraing |
| 20:00 CEST (UTC+2) | Mouandilmadji 35'; Maziz 80', 104' | Report | Matsubara 53'; Koita 57' | Stadium: Stade du Pairay; Referee: Brent Staessens |
