= 2025–26 KAA Gent season =

KAA Gent
2025–26 season
- Manager: Ivan Leko (until 8 December 2025); Rik De Mil (from 10 December 2025)
- Stadium: Planet Group Arena
- All statistics correct as of 25 May 2025.

The 2025–26 season is the 126th season in the history of the KAA Gent as a football club, and the 37th consecutive season in Belgian Pro League. In addition to the domestic league, the team participated in the Belgian Cup.

== Squad ==
As of 3 February 2026

Note: Flags indicate national team as defined under FIFA eligibility rules; some limited exceptions apply. Players may hold more than one non-FIFA nationality.

No.	Pos.	Nation	Player
3	DF	EST	Maksim Paskotši
4	DF	JPN	Daiki Hashioka (on loan from Slavia Praha)
7	FW	CIV	Wilfried Kanga
8	FW	POL	Michał Skóraś
10	MF	NED	Aimé Omgba
11	FW	SWE	Momodou Sonko
15	MF	JPN	Atsuki Itō
17	MF	BEL	Mathias Delorge
18	MF	BEL	Matisse Samoise
19	FW	SEN	Moctar Diop
20	DF	POR	Tiago Araújo
21	FW	ENG	Max Dean
22	MF	POR	Leonardo Lopes
23	GK	BEL	Tom Vandenberghe
24	MF	KOR	Hong Hyun-seok (on loan from Mainz 05)

No.	Pos.	Nation	Player
25	DF	MAR	Hatim Essaouabi
27	MF	BEL	Tibe De Vlieger
28	MF	BEL	Mohammed El Âdfaoui
29	DF	HAI	Jean-Kévin Duverne (on loan from Nantes)
30	GK	BEL	Kjell Peersman
31	GK	BEL	Bas Evers
33	GK	BEL	Davy Roef (captain)
35	DF	BEL	Gilles De Meyer
37	MF	ALG	Abdelkahar Kadri
39	DF	BFA	Abdoul Ayinde
44	DF	BEL	Siebe Van der Heyden
45	FW	CIV	Hyllarion Goore
57	DF	BEL	Matties Volckaert
62	MF	BEL	Wout Asselman

=== Out on loan ===
Note: Flags indicate national team as defined under FIFA eligibility rules; some limited exceptions apply. Players may hold more than one non-FIFA nationality.

No.	Pos.	Nation	Player
—	DF	ANG	Núrio Fortuna (at Volos until 30 June 2026)
—	DF	CAF	Hugo Gambor (at Troyes until 30 June 2026)
—	DF	CMR	Samuel Kotto (at Reims until 30 June 2026)

No.	Pos.	Nation	Player
—	MF	BEL	Pieter Gerkens (at Cercle Brugge until 30 June 2026)
—	FW	JPN	Daisuke Yokota (at Hannover 96 until 30 June 2026)
—	FW	BEL	Dante Vanzeir (at Cercle Brugge until 30 June 2026)

== Transfers ==
=== In ===
Pos.	Player	Transferred from	Fee	Date	Source
GK	(Belgium) Kjell Peersman	(Netherlands) PSV Eindhoven	Transfer	25 July 2025	
DF	(Belgium) Siebe Van der Heyden	(Spain) RCD Mallorca	Transfer	25 July 2025	
MF	(Algeria) Abdelkahar Kadri	(Belgium) K.V. Kortrijk	Transfer	30 July 2025	
DF	(Estonia) Maksim Paskotši	(Switzerland) Grasshoppers	Undisclosed	4 August 2025	
MF	(Poland) Michał Skóraś	(Belgium) Club Brugge	3 million	6 September 2025	
DF	(Haiti) Jean-Kévin Duverne	(France) FC Nantes	Loan	8 September 2025	
FW	(South Korea) Hong Hyun-seok	(Germany) 1. FSV Mainz 05	Loan	14 January 2026	
FW	(Senegal) Moctar Diop	(Norway) Lillestrøm SK	Transfer	23 January 2026	
DF	(Japan) Daiki Hashioka	(Czech Republic) Slavia Prague	Loan	2 February 2026	

=== Out ===
Pos.	Player	Transferred to	Fee	Date	Source
DF	(Central African Republic) Hugo Gambor	(France) ES Troyes AC	Loan	27 August 2025	

== Belgian Pro League ==
=== Regular season ===
Pos	Team	Pld	W	D	L	GF	GA	GD	Pts	Qualification or relegation
2	Club Brugge	30	20	3	7	59	36	+23	63	Qualification for the Champions' play-offs
3	Sint-Truiden	30	18	3	9	47	35	+12	57	Qualification for the Champions' play-offs
4	Gent	30	13	6	11	49	43	+6	45	Qualification for the Champions' play-offs
5	Mechelen	30	12	9	9	39	37	+2	45	Qualification for the Champions' play-offs
6	Anderlecht	30	12	8	10	43	39	+4	44	Qualification for the Champions' play-offs

Source: Jupiler Pro League (in Dutch)
Rules for classification: 1) Points; 2) Matches won; 3) Goal difference; 4) Goals scored; 5) Away matches won; 6) Away goal difference; 7) Away goals scored; 8) Play-off.

==== Matches ====
27 July 2025 1	STVV	3–1	KAA Gent	Stayen
	Lopes 77' (o.g.); Bertaccini 88'; Itō 90+6'		Kanga 83' (pen.)	Referee: Put Bel

2 August 2025 2	Gent	1–0	La Louvière	Ghent
20:45	Ito 87'		Lahssaini (yellow card) 88'	Stadium: Planet Group Arena; Attendance: 10,412; Referee: Nathan Verboomen

9 August 2025 3	Gent	2–3	Union Saint-Gilloise	Ghent
20:45 CEST	Goore 81'; Samoise (yellow card) 85'; Paskotsi 90+5'		Leysen 27'; Khalaili (yellow card) 38'; Rodríguez 51'; Zorgane 73' (yellow card) 90+5'; Sykes (yellow card) 85'; Burgess (yellow card) 86'	Stadium: Ghelamco Arena

16 August 2025 4	Mechelen	1–1	KAA Gent	AFAS Stadion
	Bafdili 17'	Report	Gandelman 64'	Attendance: 11,905; Referee: Nicolas Laforge

31 August 2025 5	KAA Gent	1–1	Club Brugge
	Goore 90+9'	Report	Vanaken 54'

14 September 2025 6	Antwerp	1–2	Gent	Antwerp
13:30 CEST (UTC+2)	Tsunashima (yellow card) 17'; Foulon (yellow card) 29'; Bozhinov 36'; Hamdaoui (yellow card) 74'; Al-Sahafi (yellow card) 88'		Kotto (red card) 14'; Van der Heyden (yellow card) 31'; Skóraś 45+2'; Samoise 47'; Duverne (yellow card) 53'	Stadium: Bosuilstadion; Attendance: 13,650; Referee: Lawrence Visser

19 September 2025 7	Gent	3–0	F.C.V. Dender E.H.	Planet Group Arena
	Kanga 6', 48'; Kadri 83'	Report		Attendance: 10,923; Referee: Jan Boterberg

23 September 2025 8	Anderlecht	1–0	KAA Gent
	Stroeykens 68'	Report

28 September 2025 9	Cercle Brugge	2–4	Gent	Jan Breydel Stadium
	Ngoura 22' (pen.); Utkus 43'	Report	Skóraś 16'; Itō 45+1'; Gandelman 69'; Surdez 87'	Attendance: 5,061; Referee: Bert Put

3 October 2025 10	Gent	2–1	Charleroi	Ghent
20:45 UTC+2	Itō 9'; Samoise (yellow card) 26'; Kanga (yellow card) 69'; Gandelman 71'		Pflücke 28'; Titraoui (yellow card) 50'; Guiton (yellow card) 63'; Camara (yellow card) 81'; Blum (yellow card) 86'	Stadium: Planet Group Arena; Attendance: 12,412; Referee: Lawrence Visser

19 October 2025 11	SV Zulte Waregem	4–1	Gent	Elindus Arena
	Claes 15'; Araújo 25' (o.g.); Nyssen 41'; Erenbjerg 81'	Report	Gandelman 78'	Attendance: 9,577; Referee: Erik Lambrechts

25 October 2025 12	Gent	4–0	Standard Liège	Planet Group Arena
	Van der Heyden 7', 45+4'; Gandelman 17', 83'	Report		Attendance: 15,794; Referee: Nathan Verboomen

2 November 2025 13	OH Leuven	4–0	Gent	Den Dreef
	Ikwuemesi 32'; Łakomy 43'; Nyakossi 63'; Teklab 80'	Report	Dean (red card) 90+4'	Attendance: 6,343; Referee: Wesli De Cremer

9 November 2025 14	Gent	1–1	KRC Genk	Planet Group Arena
	Gandelman 56'	Report	Oh 24'	Attendance: 16,226; Referee: Jan Boterberg

22 November 2025 15	K.V.C. Westerlo	0–0	Gent
		Report		Attendance: 5,987; Referee: Bert Put

30 November 2025 16	KAA Gent	1–2	STVV	Planet Group Arena
	Kanga 21'	Report	Muja 59'; Gotō 66'	Attendance: 11,985; Referee: Lawrence Visser

6 December 2025 17	Union Saint-Gilloise	1–1	Gent	Brussels
18:15 CET	Mac Allister (yellow card) 70' (goal) 77'		Samoise 4'; Kanga (yellow card) 86'	Stadium: Joseph Marien Stadium; Attendance: 6,373; Referee: Simon Bourdeaud'Hui

14 December 2025 18	Gent	0–2	Antwerp	Ghent
13:30 CET (UTC+1)	Skóraś (red card) 90+1'		Kerk 30'; Janssen (yellow card) 74'; Valencia 83'	Stadium: Planet Group Arena; Attendance: 14,747; Referee: Nicolas Laforge

21 December 2025 19	Club Brugge	2–1	KAA Gent
13:30	Vermant 22'; Tresoldi 86'		Paskotši 53'

27 December 2025 20	Gent	2–0	K.V.C. Westerlo	Planet Group Arena
	Goore 18'; Paskotši 23'	Report		Attendance: 10,838; Referee: Simon Bourdeaud'hui

18 January 2026 21	KAA Gent	4–2	Anderlecht
	Kanga 37'; Tiago Araújo 81'; Dean 84'; Goore 94'	Report	Angulo 4', 43'

23 January 2026 22	Standard Liège	0–4	Gent	Stade Maurice Dufrasne
		Report	Kanga 11', 31', 84'; Paskotši 88'	Attendance: 15,559; Referee: Lothar D'Hondt

30 January 2026 23	RAAL La Louvière	1–1	Gent	Easi Arena
	Gillot 81'	Report	Hong 56'	Attendance: 5,021; Referee: Massimiliano Ledda

7 February 2026 24	Gent	1–3	OH Leuven	Planet Group Arena
	Goore 54'	Report	Nyakossi 17'; Schrijvers 25' (pen.); Maziz 70'	Attendance: 12,465; Referee: Kevin Van Damme

14 February 2026 25	Charleroi	2–3	Gent	Charleroi
18:15 UTC+2	Keita 67'; Ousou 88'	Report	Itō 11'; Dean 59', 71' (pen.)	Stadium: Stade du Pays de Charleroi; Attendance: 6,112; Referee: Erik Lambrechts

20 February 2026 26	Gent	0–1	Cercle Brugge	Planet Group Arena
	Essaoubi (red card) 52'	Report	Vanzeir 45+1'	Attendance: 13,072; Referee: Jan Boterberg

1 March 2026 27	KRC Genk	3–0	Gent	Cegeka Arena
	El Ouahdi 4'; Adedeji-Sternberg 48'; Sor 90+1'	Report		Attendance: 16,270; Referee: Nicolas Laforge

8 March 2026 28	Gent	3–1	Mechelen	Planet Group Arena
	Dean 31' (pen.); Lopes 45+2'; Cissé 83'	Report	van Brederode 69'	Attendance: 16,644; Referee: Lothar D'Hondt

13 March 2026 29	Gent	2–0	Zulte Waregem	Planet Group Arena
	Dean 38'; Kanga 68' (pen.)	Report		Attendance: 15,754; Referee: Simon Bourdeaud'hui

22 March 2026 30	F.C.V. Dender E.H.	1–3	Gent	Dender Football Complex
	Ferarro 14'	Report	Dean 11'; Kadri 65'; Kanga 89'	Attendance: 3,214; Referee: Wesli De Cremer

==== Champions' play-offs ====
===== League table =====
Pos	Team	Pld	W	D	L	GF	GA	GD	Pts	Qualification or relegation
3	Sint-Truiden	10	4	2	4	14	11	+3	43	Qualification for the Europa League play-off round (Note: Union SG won the 2025–26 Belgian Cup and qualified for the Champions League through finishing in the top two, the Europa League play-off round berth was therefore transferred to Sint-Truiden.)
4	Anderlecht	10	3	2	5	16	23	−7	33	Qualification for the Europa League second qualifying round
5	Gent (O)	10	0	6	4	4	14	−10	29	Qualification for the European competition play-off
6	Mechelen	10	1	3	6	9	24	−15	29	

Source: Jupiler Pro League (in Dutch), Soccerway
Rules for classification: 1) Points; 2) Points without (possible) half points added due to rounding; 3) Regular season finishing position.
(O) Play-off winners
Notes:

Round	1	2	3	4
Ground	H	A	H	A
Result	D	L	D	
Position				

Updated to match(es) played on 19 April 2026. Source:
A = Away; H = Home; W = Win; D = Draw; L = Loss

===== Matches =====
6 April 2026 1	KAA Gent	1–1	Mechelen	Planet Group Arena
	Dean 15'	Report	Antonio 90+5'	Attendance: 13,105; Referee: Jan Boterberg

12 April 2026 2	Anderlecht	3–1	KAA Gent	Constant Vanden Stock Stadium
	Verschaeren 79'; Degreef 90+3'; Bertaccini 90+6'	Report	Kanga 22' (pen.)	Attendance: 15,029; Referee: Lawrence Visser

19 April 2026 3	KAA Gent	0–0	STVV	Planet Group Arena
		Report		Attendance: 12,257; Referee: Jasper Vergoote

22 April 2026 4	Union Saint-Gilloise	0–0	Gent	Brussels
20:30 CEST		Report		Stadium: Joseph Marien Stadium; Attendance: Joseph Marien Stadium; Referee: Lothar D'Hondt

26 April 2026 5	KAA Gent	0–2	Club Brugge	Planet Group Arena
		Report	Vetlesen 4'; Tzolis 89'	Referee: Erik Lambrechts

3 May 2026 6	Mechelen	1–0	KAA Gent	Achter de Kazerne
	Boersma 16'	Report		Referee: Simon Bourdeaud'hui

10 May 2026 7	KAA Gent	1–1	Anderlecht	Planet Group Arena
	Duverne 44'	Report	Lopes 11' (o.g.); Cvetković (red card) 45+2'	Referee: Nathan Verboomen

16 May 2026 8	STVV	1–1	KAA Gent	Stayen
	Soh 69'	Report	Kanga 45'	Referee: Lawrence Visser

21 May 2026 9	KAA Gent	0–0	Union Saint-Gilloise	Ghent
13:30 CEST		Report		Stadium: Planet Group Arena; Referee: Jasper Vergoote

24 May 2026 10	Club Brugge	5–0	KAA Gent	Jan Breydel Stadium
	Forbs 21'; Tresoldi 33', 41', 53'; Tzolis 79'	Report		Referee: Erik Lambrechts

=== Belgian Cup ===
30 October 2025 Seventh round	Gent	5–0	Patro Eisden Maasmechelen	Gent
20:30 CET	Samoise 29'; Van der Heyden 63', 85'; Gandelman 81'; Itō 88'	Report		Stadium: Planet Group Arena

3 December 2025 Eighth round	Cercle Brugge	1–3	Gent	Bruges
20:30 CET	Adewumi 34'	Report	Van der Heyden 9'; Kadri 45+1'; Goore 90+4'	Stadium: Jan Breydel Stadium

15 January 2026 Quarter–finals	Anderlecht	1–0	Gent	Anderlecht
20:30 CET	Hazard 28' (pen.)	Report		Stadium: Constant Vanden Stock Stadium
