= Stan Van Dessel =

Belgian footballer (born 2001)

Personal information
- Date of birth: 24 July 2001 (age 25)
- Place of birth: Diest, Belgium
- Height: 1.69 m (5 ft 7 in)
- Position: Midfielder

Team information
- Current team: MVV
- Number: 8

Youth career
- 2007–2008: Langdorp
- 2008–2017: OH Leuven
- 2017–2020: Sint-Truiden

Senior career*
Years	Team	Apps	(Gls)
2019–2023	Sint-Truiden	40	(0)
2023–2024	Lierse	20	(2)
2024–	MVV	44	(8)

International career^{‡}
2017	Belgium U16	3	(0)
2018	Belgium U17	2	(0)
2019–2020	Belgium U19	2	(0)
- * Club domestic league appearances and goals as of 28 April 2026 ‡ National team caps and goals as of 20 February 2020

Stan Van Dessel (born 24 July 2001) is a Belgian professional footballer who plays as a midfielder for Dutch Eerste Divisie club MVV.

== Club career ==
He made his Belgian First Division A debut for Sint-Truiden on 2 August 2019 in a game against Club Brugge. He started the game and was substituted after 56 minutes.

On 6 September 2023, Van Dessel signed a one-season contract with Lierse.

On 25 June 2024 Van Dessel signed a three-year contract with Dutch Eerste Divisie club MVV. He made his competitive debut on 21 September, coming on as an 83rd-minute substitute for Marko Kleinen in a 1–0 derby defeat to Roda JC. On 2 December, during a 3–2 away victory against Jong AZ, he sustained a knee injury that ruled him out for six months.

== Career statistics ==
=== Club ===
As of match played 22 March 2026

Appearances and goals by club, season and competition
Club	Season	League			National cup (Note: Includes Belgian Cup and KNVB Cup)		Other		Total	
Club	Season	Division	Apps	Goals	Apps	Goals	Apps	Goals	Apps	Goals
Sint-Truidense	2019–20	Belgian First Division A	5	0	0	0	—		5	0
Sint-Truidense	2020–21	Belgian First Division A	6	0	0	0	—		6	0
Sint-Truidense	2021–22	Belgian First Division A	5	0	0	0	—		5	0
Sint-Truidense	2022–23	Belgian Pro League	20	0	1	0	—		21	0
Sint-Truidense	2023–24	Belgian Pro League	4	0	0	0	—		4	0
Sint-Truidense	Total		40	0	1	0	—		41	0
Lierse	2023–24	Challenger Pro League	20	2	2	0	—		22	2
MVV	2024–25	Eerste Divisie	8	1	0	0	—		8	1
MVV	2025–26	Eerste Divisie	32	7	1	0	—		33	7
MVV	Total		40	8	1	0	—		41	8
Career total			100	10	4	0	—		104	10
