= Ryoya Ogawa =

Japanese footballer

Ryoya Ogawa 小川 諒也
- Ogawa with Kashima Antlers in 2026

Personal information
- Date of birth: 24 November 1996 (age 29)
- Place of birth: Tokyo, Japan
- Height: 1.83 m (6 ft 0 in)
- Position: Left-back

Team information
- Current team: Kashima Antlers
- Number: 7

Youth career
- Colega SC
- –2011: Forza '02
- 2012–2014: RKU Kashiwa High School

Senior career*
Years	Team	Apps	(Gls)
2015–2024	FC Tokyo	133	(4)
2015	→ J.League U-22 Selection (loan)	1	(0)
2016–2019	FC Tokyo U-23	52	(1)
2022–2023	→ Vitória Guimarães (loan)	6	(0)
2022–2023	→ Vitória Guimarães B (loan)	3	(0)
2023–2024	→ Sint-Truiden (loan)	7	(1)
2024–2025	Sint-Truiden	35	(2)
2025–	Kashima Antlers	27	(0)

International career^{‡}
2021–	Japan	5	(0)
- * Club domestic league appearances and goals as of 9 August 2026 ‡ National team caps and goals as of 15 June 2021

Ryoya Ogawa (小川 諒也, Ogawa Ryōya; born 24 November 1996) is a Japanese professional footballer who plays as a left-back for J1 League club Kashima Antlers.

== Club career ==
Ogawa joined FC Tokyo in 2016 and made his league debut against Vegalta Sendai on 6 March 2016.

In June 2023, Ogawa signed for Belgian Pro League club Sint-Truiden on a season-long loan deal with the option to make the move permanent.

At the end of the 2024–25 Belgian league season, Ogawa returned to Japan, transferring to J1 League club Kashima Antlers for the remainder of their 2025 season.

== International career ==
Ogawa made his debut for Japan national team on 25 March 2021 in a friendly against South Korea.

== Career statistics ==
=== Club ===
As of 21 June 2025

Appearances and goals by club, season and competition
Club	Season	League			National cup (Note: Includes Emperor's Cup, Taça de Portugal, Belgian Cup.)		League cup (Note: Includes J.League Cup, Taça da Liga.)		Continental		Total	
Club	Season	Division	Apps	Goals	Apps	Goals	Apps	Goals	Apps	Goals	Apps	Goals
J.League U-22 Selection	2015	J3 League	1	0	—		—		—		1	0
FC Tokyo U-23	2016	J3 League	14	0	—		—		—		14	0
FC Tokyo U-23	2017	J3 League	26	1	—		—		—		26	1
FC Tokyo U-23	2018	J3 League	11	0	—		—		—		11	0
FC Tokyo U-23	2019	J3 League	1	0	—		—		—		1	0
FC Tokyo U-23	Total		52	1	—		—		—		52	1
FC Tokyo	2016	J1 League	18	0	2	0	2	0	4	0	26	0
FC Tokyo	2017	J1 League	5	0	1	0	7	1	—		13	1
FC Tokyo	2018	J1 League	15	0	1	0	4	0	—		20	0
FC Tokyo	2019	J1 League	22	1	2	0	3	0	—		27	1
FC Tokyo	2020	J1 League	28	0	—		3	0	7	0	38	0
FC Tokyo	2021	J1 League	30	1	0	0	3	0	—		33	1
FC Tokyo	2022	J1 League	15	2	2	0	2	1	—		19	3
FC Tokyo	Total		133	4	8	0	24	2	11	0	176	6
Vitória Guimarães (loan)	2022–23	Primeira Liga	6	0	0	0	1	0	4	0	11	0
Sint-Truiden (loan)	2023–24	Belgian Pro League	7	1	1	0	—		—		8	1
Sint-Truiden	2024–25	Belgian Pro League	35	2	2	0	—		—		37	2
Sint-Truiden	Sint-Truiden total		42	3	3	0	—		—		45	3
Kashima Antlers	2025	J1 League	15	0	3	1	0	0	—		18	1
Kashima Antlers	2026	J1 (100)	11	0	—		—		—		11	0
Kashima Antlers	2026–27	J1 League	1	0	0	0	0	0	0	0	1	0
Kashima Antlers	Total		27	0	3	1	0	0	0	0	30	1
Career total			261	8	14	1	25	2	15	0	315	11

== Honours ==
FC Tokyo

- J.League Cup: 2020

Kashima Antlers

- J1 League: 2025
