= Daiki Hashioka =

Japanese footballer (born 1999)

Daiki Hashioka 橋岡 大樹
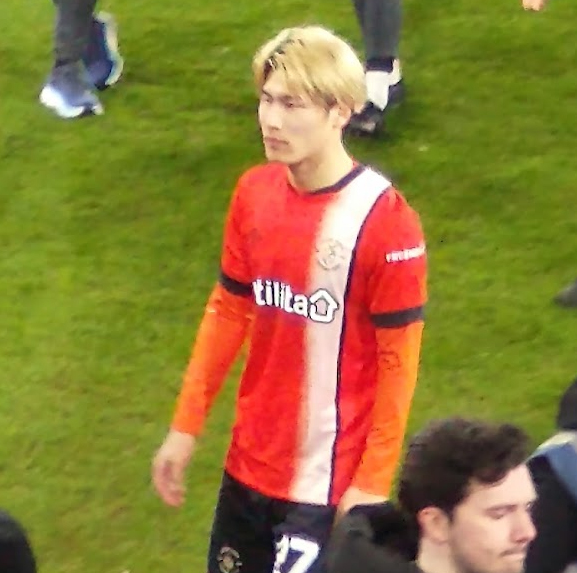
- Hashioka with Luton Town in 2024

Personal information
- Full name: Daiki Hashioka
- Date of birth: 17 May 1999 (age 27)
- Place of birth: Sakura-ku, Saitama, Japan
- Height: 1.84 m (6 ft 0 in)
- Positions: Right-back; centre-back

Team information
- Current team: Borussia Mönchengladbach (on loan from Slavia Prague)
- Number: 14

Youth career
- 2006–2011: Urawa Okubo SSS
- 2012–2017: Urawa Red Diamonds

Senior career*
Years	Team	Apps	(Gls)
2017–2021	Urawa Red Diamonds	74	(4)
2021	→ Sint-Truiden (loan)	6	(0)
2021–2024	Sint-Truiden	80	(2)
2024–2025	Luton Town	27	(0)
2025–	Slavia Prague	8	(0)
2026	→ Gent (loan)	16	(0)
2026–	→ Borussia Mönchengladbach (loan)	6	(0)

International career^{‡}
2021–	Japan U23	2	(0)
2019–	Japan	12	(0)
Medal record
Representing Japan
AFC U-19 Championship
Bronze medal – third place	2018
- * Club domestic league appearances and goals as of 17:30, 31 October 2026 (UTC) ‡ National team caps and goals as of 23:50, 28 March 2026 (UTC)

Daiki Hashioka (橋岡 大樹, Hashioka Daiki; born 17 May 1999) is a Japanese professional footballer who plays as a right-back or centre-back for Bundesliga club Borussia Mönchengladbach, on loan from Czech First League club Slavia Prague, and the Japan national team.

== Club career ==
=== Urawa Reds ===
Daiki Hashioka joined J1 League club Urawa Reds in 2017. On 30 August, he debuted in J.League Cup (v Cerezo Osaka). On 6 March 2019, Hashioka made his AFC Champions League debut, at 19 years old, scoring twice in a 3–0 victory over Thai club Buriram United.

=== Sint–Truiden ===
On 31 January 2021, Hashioka joined Sint-Truiden on loan for the remainder of the 2020–21 season. Hashioka made his debut in European football on 28 February 2021, as a substitute in a 2–0 defeat to Eupen. Hashioka joined Sint-Truiden permanently at the end of the season, scoring his first goal for the club on 17 September 2023, in a 2–0 victory over Mechelen.

=== Luton Town ===
On 30 January 2024, Hashioka signed with Luton Town, becoming the first ever Japanese player in the club history. He made his Hatters debut after coming off the bench in a 6–2 loss to holders Manchester City in the fifth round of the FA Cup. He then scored an own goal in the 2nd minute against Manchester City in the Premier League on 13 April 2024.

=== Slavia Prague ===
On 27 June 2025, following successive relegations with Luton Town, Hashioka signed for Slavia Prague for an undisclosed fee.

==== Loan to Gent ====
On 2 February 2026, Hashioka joined Belgian Pro League club Gent on a half-year loan deal with an option to make the transfer permanent.

==== Loan to Borussia Mönchengladbach ====
At the end of July, he has joined Borussia Mönchengladbach on a loan.

== International career ==
After playing for several youth teams, Hashioka made his first team debut for the Japan national team, on 10 December 2019, in a 2–1 victory over China.

== Personal life ==
He is the younger brother of fellow footballer Kazuki Hashioka and cousin of long jump athlete, Yuki Hashioka.

== Career statistics ==
=== Club ===
As of match played 31 October 2026

Appearances and goals by club, season and competition
Club	Season	League			National cup (Note: Includes Emperor's Cup, Belgian Cup, FA Cup, Czech Cup)		League cup (Note: Includes J. League Cup, EFL Cup)		Continental		Total	
Club	Season	Division	Apps	Goals	Apps	Goals	Apps	Goals	Apps	Goals	Apps	Goals
Urawa Red Diamonds	2017	J1 League	0	0	0	0	2	0	0	0	2	0
Urawa Red Diamonds	2018	J1 League	25	1	4	0	5	0	0	0	34	0
Urawa Red Diamonds	2019	J1 League	18	2	1	0	5	0	8 (Note: Appearances in AFC Champions League)	2	32	4
Urawa Red Diamonds	2020	J1 League	31	1	0	0	1	0	0	0	32	1
Urawa Red Diamonds	Total		74	4	5	0	13	0	8	2	100	5
Sint-Truiden (loan)	2020–21	Belgian Pro League	6	0	0	0	—		—		6	0
Sint-Truiden	2021–22	Belgian Pro League	30	0	1	0	—		—		31	0
Sint-Truiden	2022–23	Belgian Pro League	32	0	3	0	—		—		35	0
Sint-Truiden	2023–24	Belgian Pro League	18	2	1	0	—		—		19	2
Sint-Truiden	Total		80	2	5	0	0	0	0	0	85	2
Luton Town	2023–24	Premier League	10	0	1	0	—		—		11	0
Luton Town	2024–25	Championship	17	0	0	0	0	0	—		17	0
Luton Town	Total		27	0	1	0	0	0	—		28	0
Slavia Prague	2025–26	Czech First League	8	0	2	0	—		4 (Note: Appearances in UEFA Champions League)	0	14	0
Gent (loan)	2025–26	Belgian Pro League	16	0	—		—		—		16	0
Borussia Mönchengladbach	2026–27	Bundesliga	6	0	1	1	—		—		7	1
Total			217	6	14	1	13	0	12	2	250	9

=== International ===
As of match played 28 March 2026

Appearances and goals by national team and year
National team	Year	Apps	Goals
Japan	2019	2	0
Japan	2023	5	0
Japan	2024	4	0
Japan	2026	1	0
Total		12	0

== Honours ==
Urawa Red Diamonds

- J.League Cup / Copa Sudamericana Championship: 2017
- Emperor's Cup: 2018
- AFC Champions League runner-up: 2019

Japan

- EAFF E-1 Football Championship runner-up: 2019
