= Kahveh Zahiroleslam =

American soccer player

Personal information
- Full name: Kahveh Zahiroleslam
- Date of birth: June 13, 2002 (age 24)
- Place of birth: Saratoga, California, United States
- Height: 6 ft 4 in (1.93 m)
- Position: Striker

Team information
- Current team: Cracovia
- Number: 18

Youth career
- De Anza Force

College career
| Years | Team | Apps | (Gls) |
| 2021–2022 | Yale Bulldogs | 28 | (13) |

Senior career*
| Years | Team | Apps | (Gls) |
| 2022 | Chicago FC United | 12 | (9) |
| 2023–2025 | Sint-Truiden | 47 | (8) |
| 2025– | Cracovia | 23 | (3) |
| 2025– | Cracovia II | 3 | (2) |
- * Club domestic league appearances and goals as of May 29, 2026

Kahveh Zahiroleslam (Persian: کاوه ظهیرالاسلام; born June 13, 2002) is an American professional soccer player who plays as a striker for Polish Ekstraklasa club Cracovia.

== Early life ==
Kahveh Zahiroleslam was born and raised in Saratoga, California to an Iranian-American family. He attended Prospect High School and played youth soccer for De Anza Force in the U.S. Soccer Development Academy, helping the latter win the Northwest Division of USSDA Academy in the 2018–19 season.

== College career ==
He played college soccer for the Yale Bulldogs, scoring 13 goals and providing 4 assists in 28 games. During his first season at Yale, he received four Ivy League Rookie of the Week selections, and the conference named him to the All-Ivy second team. In 2022, he joined Chicago FC United in USL League Two during Yale's summer off-season, scoring 9 goals and providing 3 assists in 12 matches.

He completed his bachelor's degree in International Relations online, after going professional.

== Club career ==
=== Sint-Truiden ===
Following a successful trial with Belgian Pro League side Sint-Truiden, he signed a contract with the club ahead of the 2023–24 season. He made his league debut on September 24, 2023, against Genk at the Cegeka Arena, and scored his first goal for the club on October 31, 2023, in a Belgian Cup round of 32 match against Francs Borains. He provided his first league assist on November 10, 2023, against Westerlo, and scored his first league goal on December 9, 2023, against OH Leuven. He scored his following goal and his club's first league goal of the 2024 calendar year in his following match against league leaders Union Saint-Gilloise on January 21, 2024, at the Joseph Marien Stadium in Brussels. He scored his first brace for the club on February 1, 2024, against Gent, bringing his tally to 4 goals in 4 successive matches. Following his good performances, his contract was extended for another season.

The following season, he scored his first league goal of the season during their home opener on August 3, 2024 against Charleroi. He scored two goals and provided an assist in the following home match on August 17 against Dender to help his team to their first point of the season. In November 2024, he suffered a hamstring injury and missed two months due to the injury. After returning from injury, he was only given substitute appearances, and at the end of the 2024–25 season, he was reportedly not offered a contract extension and became a free agent. However, he later revealed he was omitted from the squad after he refused to extend his contract, which meant he would leave on a free transfer.

=== Cracovia ===
On July 31, 2025, he moved to the Polish top division, the Ekstraklasa, joining Cracovia on a two-year contract with an option to extend it for another two years. He made his club debut on August 10, 2025 as an 80th-minute substitute in a league match against Jagiellonia at the Stadion Miejski. The following week, he scored a goal on his debut for the Cracovia reserves on August 16, 2025 in a league match against Pogoń-Sokół Lubaczów. He made his home debut for the Cracovia first team on August 31, 2025 as a 90th-minute substitute in a league match against Legia Warsaw at the Józef Piłsudski Cracovia Stadium. On September 24, 2025, he scored his first goal for the Cracovia first team, scoring on his Polish Cup debut in a knockout fixture against Górnik Łęczna. Three days later in the following match, he scored his first Ekstraklasa goal on September 27, 2025 against league leaders Górnik Zabrze.

== Career statistics ==
As of match played May 23, 2026

Appearances and goals by club, season and competition
| Club | Season | League | | | National cup (Note: Includes Belgian Cup, Polish Cup) | | Other | | Total | |
| Club | Season | Division | Apps | Goals | Apps | Goals | Apps | Goals | Apps | Goals |
|---|---|---|---|---|---|---|---|---|---|---|
| Sint-Truidense | 2023–24 | Belgian Pro League | 27 | 5 | 1 | 1 | — | | 28 | 6 |
| Sint-Truidense | 2024–25 | Belgian Pro League | 20 | 3 | 1 | 0 | 0 | 0 | 21 | 3 |
| Sint-Truidense | Total | | 47 | 8 | 2 | 1 | 0 | 0 | 49 | 9 |
| Cracovia | 2025–26 | Ekstraklasa | 23 | 3 | 2 | 1 | — | | 25 | 4 |
| Cracovia II | 2025–26 | III liga, group IV | 3 | 2 | — | | — | | 3 | 2 |
| Career total | | | 73 | 13 | 4 | 2 | 0 | 0 | 77 | 15 |

== Honors ==
De Anza Force

- U.S. Soccer Development Academy Northwest Division: 2019

Individual

- All-Ivy Second Team: 2021
