= Hyllarion Goore =

Swedish footballer (born 2005)

- Goore during KAA Gent's summer 2026 squad presentation.

Personal information
- Full name: Bi Christ Hyllarion Goore
- Date of birth: 24 October 2005 (age 21)
- Height: 1.83 m (6 ft 0 in)
- Position: Striker

Team information
- Current team: Gent
- Number: 45

Youth career
- –2024: Bokakore Academy

Senior career*
Years	Team	Apps	(Gls)
2024	Ararat Yerevan	14	(6)
2025	Jong Gent	1	(2)
2025–	Gent	52	(5)

International career^{‡}
2026–	Ivory Coast	1	(0)
- * Club domestic league appearances and goals as of 25 October 2026 ‡ National team caps and goals as of 26 March 2026

Hyllarion Goore (born 24 August 2005) is an Ivorian professional footballer who plays as a striker for KAA Gent.

== Career ==
Born in Abidjan, he failed a trial at ASEC Mimosas and instead played for local Bokakore Academy. Stating that he played in the fifth tier of Côte d'Ivoire, he was able to move to Europe, albeit to the fringes of the continent and Armenian club Ararat Yerevan. He had never travelled abroad before, nor heard of Armenia. He found that the country could be hotter than Côte d'Ivoire in the summer, and resided with other African talents.

Goore scored 6 goals in 14 games, and his stats were discovered by scout Marco Verheuge. KAA Gent bought Goore, having only seen him on video, but following two goals in his debut match for Jong Gent, he was brought straight into the first team. Goore attracted interest from other clubs including SC Freiburg in the 2025–26 winter transfer window. More clubs were mentioned during the summer, which also saw the departure of Wilfried Kanga, who had been chosen over Goore the previous season. Goore scored during Gent's European campaign, the 2026–27 UEFA Conference League qualifying and league phase.

== Career statistics ==
As of match played 25 October 2026

Appearances and goals by club, season and competition
Club	Season	League			Cup		Europe		Other		Total	
Club	Season	Division	Apps	Goals	Apps	Goals	Apps	Goals	Apps	Goals	Apps	Goals
Ararat Yerevan	2024–25	Armenian Premier League	14	6	1	0	―		―		15	6
Jong Gent	2024–25	Belgian Division 1	1	2	―		―		―		1	2
Gent	2024–25	Belgian Pro League	13	0	―		2 (Note: Appearances in UEFA Conference League)	0	―		15	0
Gent	2025–26	Belgian Pro League	33	5	3	1	—		―		36	6
Gent	2026–27	Belgian Pro League	5	0	1	0	6	2	―		12	2
Gent	Total		51	5	4	1	6	2	―		61	8
Career total			66	13	5	1	8	0	0	0	79	16
