= Fábio Baptista =

Portuguese footballer

Fabinho
Personal information
- Full name: Fábio Pereira Baptista
- Date of birth: 29 March 2001 (age 25)
- Place of birth: Lisbon, Portugal
- Height: 1.81 m (5 ft 11 in)
- Position: Right-back

Team information
- Current team: Farul Constanța

Youth career
- 2009–2013: Sintrense
- 2013–2015: 1º Dezembro
- 2015–2019: Sintrense
- 2019–2020: Benfica

Senior career*
Years	Team	Apps	(Gls)
2020–2022	Benfica B	42	(1)
2022–2023	Sint-Truiden	0	(0)
2023–2024	Leixões	13	(0)
2024–2025	Mafra	8	(0)
2025–	Farul Constanța	7	(0)
2025–2026	→ Concordia Chiajna (loan)	13	(0)

International career
2020	Portugal U19	1	(0)
2019	Portugal U20	2	(0)
- * Club domestic league appearances and goals as of 2 May 2026

Fábio Pereira Baptista (born 29 March 2001), known as Fabinho, is a Portuguese professional footballer who plays as a right-back for Liga I club Farul Constanța.

== Club career ==
On 1 July 2022, Baptista signed with Sint-Truiden in Belgium.

On 30 January 2024, Fabinho left Leixões and joined fellow Liga Portugal 2 club Mafra.

On 11 February 2025, Fabinho left Mafra and joined fellow Romanian Liga I club Farul Constanța.
