= VK Zepperen =

Belgian football club

KVK Zepperen
- Full name: Koninklijke Voetbalkring Zepperen
- Founded: 1959
- Ground: Het Dekken, Zepperen
- Manager: Marcel Koppers
- League: 1ste Prov. Limburg
Home colours

KVK Zepperen is a Belgian football club from Zepperen (Sint-Truiden). The club is associated to the KBVB with number 6209 and has purple and white as their club colors.
