= Andréa Librici =

Belgian footballer (born 2004)

Personal information
- Full name: Andréa Giuseppe Librici
- Date of birth: 9 December 2004 (age 21)
- Place of birth: Liège, Belgium
- Height: 1.81 m (5 ft 11 in)
- Position: Right-back

Team information
- Current team: Houtvenne
- Number: 32

Youth career
- 2010–2012: Herstal
- 2012–2014: Visé
- 2014–2019: Sint-Truiden
- 2019–2021: OH Leuven
- 2021–2022: Sint-Truiden

Senior career*
Years	Team	Apps	(Gls)
2022–2024	Sint-Truiden	1	(0)
2024–2026	MVV	32	(1)
2026–	Houtvenne	2	(0)
- * Club domestic league appearances and goals as of 14:07, 30 April 2026 (UTC)

Andréa Giuseppe Librici (born 9 December 2004) is a Belgian professional footballer who plays as a right-back for Belgian Division 1 club Houtvenne.

== Club career ==
=== Sint-Truiden ===
Born in Liège, Andréa Librici first played with some local clubs, before joining Sint-Truiden as a 9-year-old. He spent all his youth years with the club from Limburg —except a hiatus at OH Leuven between 2019 and 2021—before entering the first team during the 2022 pre-season.

Librici made his professional debut for Sint-Truidense on 30 July 2022, replacing Shinji Kagawa during a 1–1 away draw to Gent. The following week, he signed his first professional contract with the club.

=== MVV ===
On 23 January 2024, Librici joined MVV in the Netherlands on an amateur basis. He made his competitive debut for the club three days later, replacing Tim Zeegers in the 79th minute of a 3–0 away win over Eindhoven.

Librici impressed during his first six months at the club, and signed a professional contract with MVV on 20 June 2024, keeping him at the club until 2026. On 4 November 2024, he scored his first goal for the club in a 4–3 loss to Jong Utrecht.

=== Return to Belgium ===
On 16 January 2026, Librici joined Belgian Division 1 club Houtvenne.

== Personal life ==
Born in Belgium, Librici is of Italian descent.

== Career statistics ==
As of match played 13 December 2024

Appearances and goals by club, season and competition
Club	Season	League			Cup		Other		Total	
Club	Season	Division	Apps	Goals	Apps	Goals	Apps	Goals	Apps	Goals
Sint-Truiden	2022–23	Belgian Pro League	1	0	1	0	—		2	0
MVV	2023–24	Eerste Divisie	13	0	0	0	—		13	0
MVV	2024–25	Eerste Divisie	15	1	1	0	—		16	1
MVV	Total		28	1	1	0	—		29	1
Career total			29	1	2	0	0	0	31	1
