= Bruno Godeau =

Belgian footballer (born 1992)

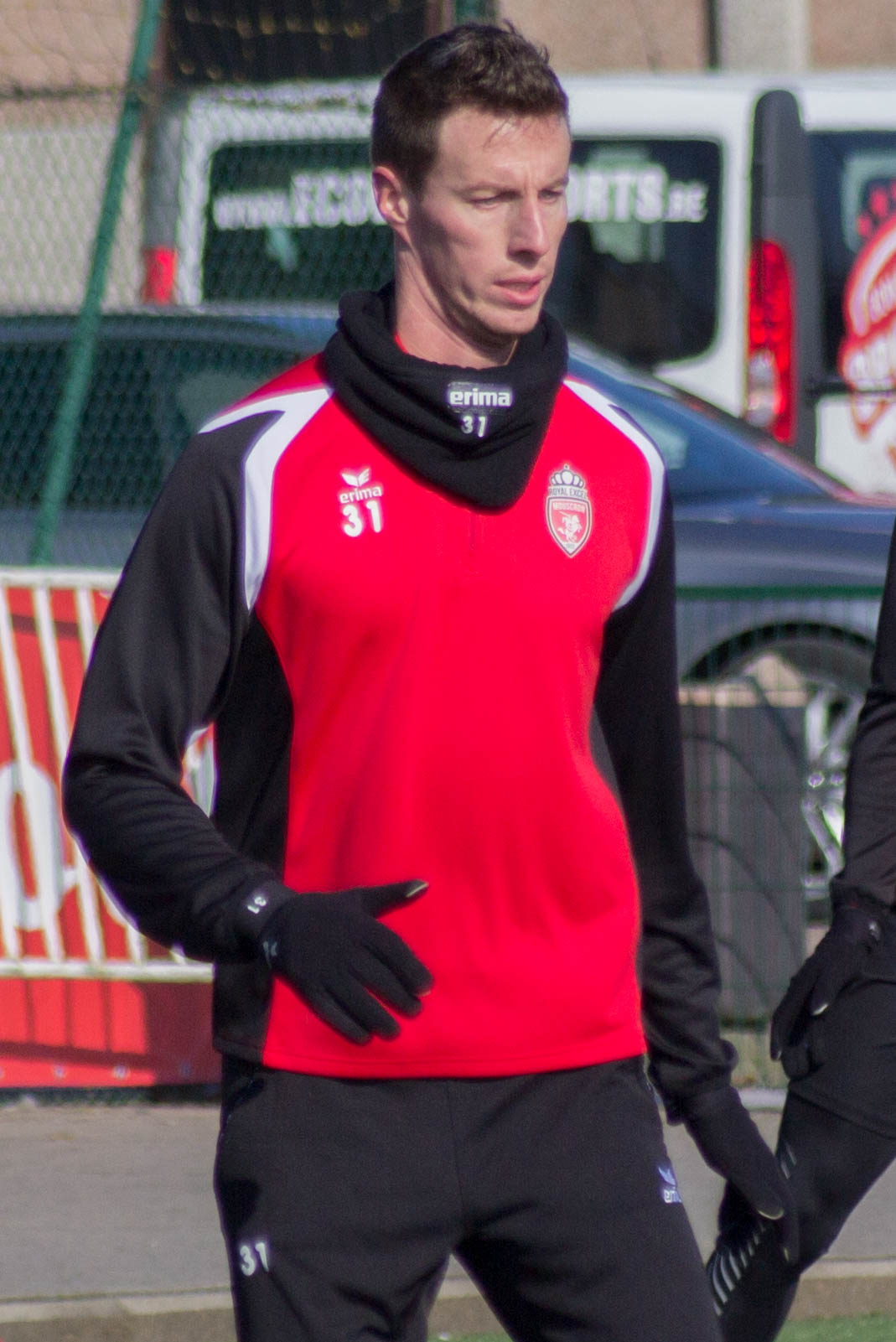
- Godeau training with Mouscron in February 2018

Personal information
- Date of birth: 10 May 1992 (age 34)
- Place of birth: Tubize, Belgium
- Height: 1.90 m (6 ft 3 in)
- Position: Centre back

Team information
- Current team: Beveren
- Number: 31

Youth career
- 1998–2000: RSD Jette
- 2000–2004: Anderlecht
- 2004–2006: MTK Budapest
- 2006–2012: Anderlecht

Senior career*
Years	Team	Apps	(Gls)
2012–2013	Anderlecht	0	(0)
2012–2013	→ Zulte-Waregem (loan)	11	(0)
2013–2016	Zulte-Waregem	17	(0)
2014–2015	→ Westerlo (loan)	20	(0)
2016–2017	Oostende	21	(1)
2017–2020	Mouscron	67	(3)
2020–2023	Gent	53	(1)
2023–2025	Sint-Truiden	67	(0)
2025–	Beveren	29	(4)

International career
2010	Belgium U18	1	(0)
2012–2014	Belgium U21	7	(0)
- * Club domestic league appearances and goals as of 19 April 2026

Bruno Godeau (born 10 May 1992) is a Belgian professional footballer who plays as a centre back for Beveren in the Challenger Pro League.

== Club career ==
Godeau started his football career where he was at a youth club at RSD Jette, Anderlecht, and MTK Budapest before returning to Anderlecht. Towards the end of the 2011–12 season, Godeau attracted interest from Lokeren and Heerenveen.

On the last day of the summer transfer window of 2012, Godeau joined Belgian Pro League rival Zulte-Waregem on loan for the remainder of the 2012–13 season. He made his debut for the club, in a 3–0 loss against Lokeren on 20 October 2012. Though receiving little first-team opportunities, Godeau's playing time would increase as the season progressed, under the management of Francky Dury. In the last game of the season, Godeau provided an assist for Jens Naessens to score the opener, in a 3–2 win over Mechelen on 16 March 2013. He then scored his first goal for the club with a header, though they would lose 4–3 to Standard Liège on 12 April 2013. Unfortunately, on 1 May 2014, Godeau scored an own goal, in a 4–0 loss against Genk, putting high doubt of winning the league for the first time in the club's history.

At the end of the 2012–13 season, with the good season finishing second place, Godeau would make twenty appearances and score once. On 20 April 2013, Godeau joined Zulte-Waregem on a four-year contract after the club exercise the right to sign Godeau. He made his Champions League debut in the third qualifying round second leg, as Zulte Waregem would lose 3–0 against PSV Eindhoven. He miss frequent of games, due to being on bench. Godeau had a history of injuries during the season when he suffered mononucleosis, which kept him out for three weeks.

After his first full season at Zulte Waregem, on 16 July 2014, Godeau joined Westerlo on a two-year contract, joining on an undisclosed fee. Upon joining Westerlo, Godeau was number five shirt. In late October, Goadeau made his return from injuries. Godeau have since made sporadic appearances, as he only made nine appearances in the 2013–14 season.

Before the 2023–24 season, Godeau joined Sint-Truiden.

On 28 July 2025, Godeau joined Beveren on a one-year contract.

== International career ==
Having represented Belgium U18 levels in 2010, Godeau was called up by the Belgium U21 squad by the head coach Johan Walem. He made his U21 debut coming on as a substitute for Dennis Praet in the 33rd minute of a 3–1 loss against Norway.

== Career statistics ==
=== Club ===
As of match played 23 August 2023

Appearances and goals by club, season and competition
Club	Season	League			National Cup (Note: Includes Belgian Cup)		Europe		Other		Total	
Club	Season	Division	Apps	Goals	Apps	Goals	Apps	Goals	Apps	Goals	Apps	Goals
Zulte Waregem	2012–13	Belgian Pro League	11	0	1	0	—		9 (Note: Appearance(s) in play-off)	1	21	1
Zulte Waregem	2013–14	Belgian Pro League	9	0	1	0	2 (Note: One appearance in UEFA Champions League, one in UEFA Europa League)	0	5	0	17	0
Zulte Waregem	2015–16	Belgian Pro League	8	0	1	0	—		—		9	0
Zulte Waregem	Total		28	0	3	0	2	0	14	1	47	1
Westerlo (loan)	2014–15	Belgian Pro League	20	0	1	0	—		2	0	23	0
KV Oostende	2015–16	Belgian Pro League	5	0	0	0	—		8	1	13	1
KV Oostende	2016–17	Belgian Pro League	16	1	5	0	—		4	0	25	1
KV Oostende	Total		21	1	5	0	—		12	1	38	2
Mouscron	2017–18	Belgian Pro League	19	1	2	0	—		7	0	28	1
Mouscron	2018–19	Belgian Pro League	28	1	1	0	—		6	0	35	1
Mouscron	2019–20	Belgian Pro League	20	1	2	0	—		—		22	1
Mouscron	Total		67	3	5	0	—		13	0	85	3
Gent	2019–20	Belgian Pro League	1	0	0	0	0	0	—		1	0
Gent	2020–21	Belgian Pro League	11	0	3	0	0	0	6	1	20	1
Gent	2021–22	Belgian Pro League	14	0	3	0	8 (Note: Appearance(s) in UEFA Conference League)	0	6	0	31	0
Gent	2022–23	Belgian Pro League	14	0	3	0	8 (Note: One appearance in UEFA Europa League, seven appearances and one goal in UEFA Conference League)	1	1	0	26	1
Gent	Total		40	0	9	0	16	1	13	1	78	2
Sint-Truiden	2023-24	Belgian Pro League	37	0	1	0	0	0	0	0	38	0
Sint-Truiden	Total		37	0	1	0	0	0	0	0	38	0
Career total			193	4	23	0	18	1	54	3	286	8
