= Aboubakary Koïta =

Mauritanian footballer (born 1998)

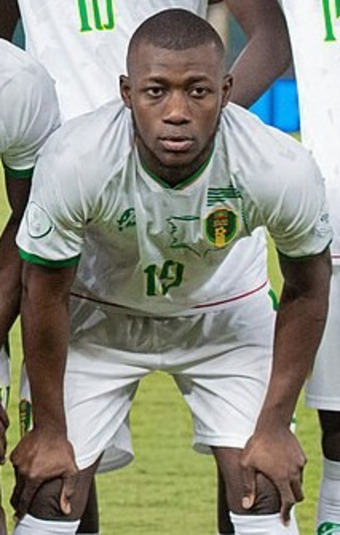

Personal information
- Full name: Aboubakary Yeli Koïta
- Date of birth: 20 September 1998 (age 28)
- Place of birth: Pikine, Senegal
- Height: 1.75 m (5 ft 9 in)
- Positions: Winger; forward

Team information
- Current team: AEK Athens
- Number: 11

Youth career
- 2011–2012: FC Merksem
- 2012–2014: Lyra-Lierse Berlaar
- 2014–2016: ASV Geel

Senior career*
Years	Team	Apps	(Gls)
2016–2017	ASV Geel	31	(5)
2017–2019	Gent	7	(0)
2019	→ Kortrijk (loan)	16	(2)
2019–2021	Waasland-Beveren	50	(9)
2021–2024	Sint-Truiden	90	(18)
2024–	AEK Athens	58	(8)

International career^{‡}
2023–	Mauritania	29	(5)
- * Club domestic league appearances and goals as of 20 September 2026 ‡ National team caps and goals as of 29 September 2026

Aboubakary Yeli Koïta (born 20 September 1998) is a professional footballer who plays as a winger for Greek Super League club AEK Athens. Born in Senegal into a family of Mauritanian origin, he plays for the Mauritania national team.

== Club career ==
Koïta began playing his football career at the youth academy of FC Merksem at the age of 13, and quickly moved to the academies of Lyra and Geel where he broke into the first team.

On 9 June 2017, Koïta signed a professional contract with Gent, keeping him at the club for 2 seasons. Koita made his professional debut with Gent in a 1–0 Belgian First Division A win over Anderlecht on 13 May 2018.

On 19 July 2019, he signed a 4-year contract with Waasland-Beveren. Under coach Nicky Hayen, Koita scored some important goals, often from outside the penalty area, which earned Waasland-Beveren important points in the battle against relegation. However, his good performances proved not to be enough to keep the club in the top division, Waasland-Beveren was relegated after losing in the relegation matches against RFC Seraing.

On 19 June 2021, he joined Sint-Truiden. He made his debut in the starting lineup on the first matchday of the 2021–22 season in the league match against KAA Gent.

=== AEK Athens ===
On 9 July 2024, AEK Athens reached an agreement with Sint-Truiden for the transfer of Koita to the former for a fee around €4 million and a 10% resale rate. Four days later, the Greek club officially announced the acquisition of the 25-year old winger until the summer of 2029.

== International career ==
Koïta was born in Senegal to a Mauritanian-Malian father and Senegalese mother, and moved to Belgium at a young age. In October 2023, he opted to play for the Mauritania national team.

On November 15, 2023, he made his debut in a match against the Democratic Republic of the Congo as part of the 2026 World Cup qualifiers. The Mourabitounes were defeated 2–0.

In December 2023, he was included in the list of twenty-five Mauritanian players selected by Amir Abdou to take part in the 2023 Africa Cup of Nations.

== Career statistics ==
As of match played 8 September 2026

Appearances and goals by club, season and competition
Club	Season	League			National cup (Note: Includes Belgian Cup, Greek Football Cup)		Continental		Other		Total	
Club	Season	Division	Apps	Goals	Apps	Goals	Apps	Goals	Apps	Goals	Apps	Goals
Sint-Truiden	2021–22	Belgian Pro League	24	3	1	1	–		–		25	4
Sint-Truiden	2022–23	Belgian Pro League	29	0	2	0	–		–		31	0
Sint-Truiden	2023–24	Belgian Pro League	37	15	1	0	–		–		38	15
Sint-Truiden	Total		90	18	4	1	–		–		94	19
AEK Athens	2024–25	Super League Greece	23	2	3	0	4 (Note: Appearances in UEFA Conference League)	0	–		30	2
AEK Athens	2025–26	Super League Greece	31	5	5	0	16	5	–		52	10
AEK Athens	2026–27	Super League Greece	2	1	0	0	3 (Note: Appearances in UEFA Champions League)	0	1 (Note: Appearance in Greek Super Cup)	0	6	1
AEK Athens	Total		56	8	8	0	23	5	1	0	88	13
Career total			146	26	12	1	23	5	1	0	182	32

== Honours ==
AEK Athens

- Super League Greece: 2025–26
