= Adriano Bertaccini =

Belgian footballer (born 2000)

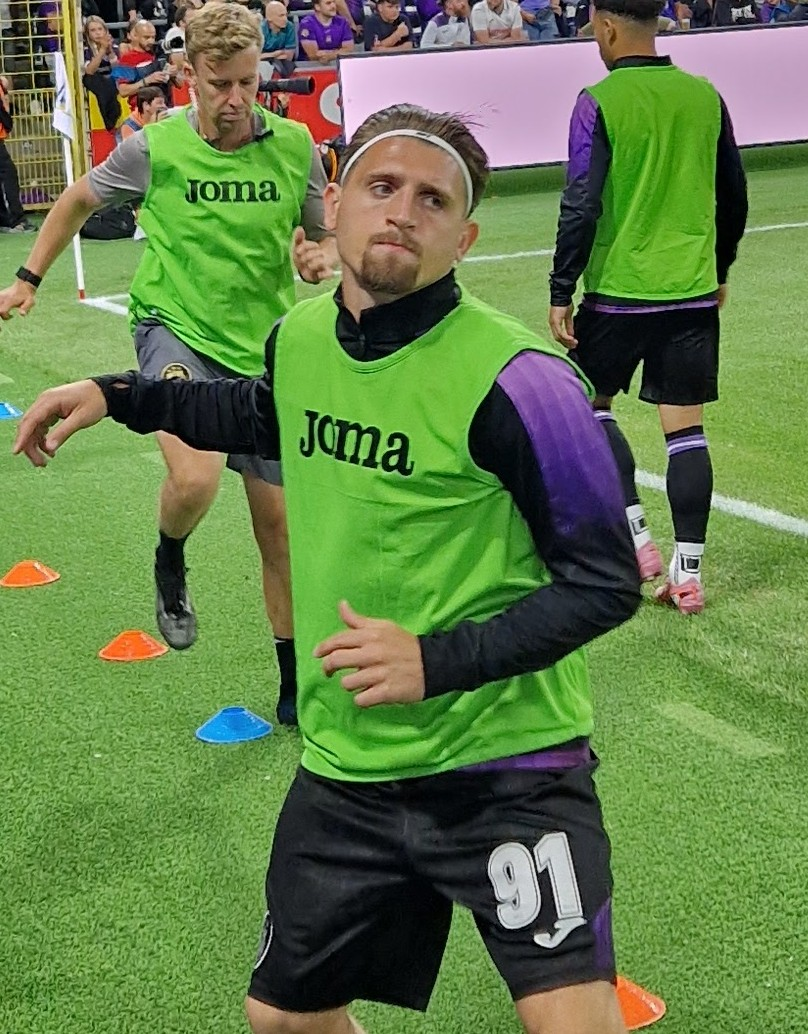
- Bertaccini with Anderlecht in 2025

Personal information
- Date of birth: 13 August 2000 (age 26)
- Place of birth: Charleroi, Belgium
- Height: 1.73 m (5 ft 8 in)
- Position: Forward

Team information
- Current team: Anderlecht
- Number: 91

Youth career
- Charleroi
- Standard Liège
- –2014: Club Brugge
- 2014–2019: Genk

Senior career*
Years	Team	Apps	(Gls)
2019–2020	Genk	0	(0)
2019–2020	→ Deinze (loan)	17	(3)
2020–2021	Austria Lustenau	21	(3)
2021–2023	Thes Sport	63	(37)
2023–2024	RFC Liège	17	(11)
2024–2025	Sint-Truiden	47	(26)
2025–	Anderlecht	36	(8)

International career
2014	Belgium U15	1	(0)
2015–2016	Belgium U16	7	(2)
2016–2017	Belgium U17	8	(2)
2017	Belgium U18	3	(0)
2018–2019	Belgium U19	5	(0)
- * Club domestic league appearances and goals as of 25 October 2026

Adriano Bertaccini (born 13 August 2000) is a Belgian professional footballer who plays as a forward for Belgian Pro League club Anderlecht.

== Club career ==
On 15 June 2023, Bertaccini signed a two-year contract with RFC Liège.

On 1 February 2024, Bertaccini moved to Sint-Truiden. He signed a contract until 2027.

On 1 August 2025, Bertaccini moved to Anderlecht, signing a contract until 2029.

His older brother Paolino Bertaccini is also a professional footballer.

== Personal life ==
Born in Belgium, Bertaccini is of Italian descent.

== Career statistics ==
As of match played 25 October 2026

Appearances and goals by club, season and competition
Club	Season	League			National cup (Note: Includes Belgian Cup)		Europe		Total	
Club	Season	Division	Apps	Goals	Apps	Goals	Apps	Goals	Apps	Goals
Genk	2019–20	Belgian Pro League	0	0	0	0	0	0	0	0
Deinze (loan)	2019–20	Belgian Division 1	17	3	0	0	—		17	3
Austria Lustenau	2020–21	2. Liga	21	3	0	0	—		21	3
Thes Sport	2021–22	Belgian National Division 1	26	11	1	1	—		27	12
Thes Sport	2022–23	Belgian National Division 1	36	26	4	4	—		40	30
Thes Sport	Total		62	37	5	5	—		67	42
RFC Liège	2023–24	Challenger Pro League	17	11	1	0	—		18	11
Sint-Truiden	2023–24	Belgian Pro League	13	4	0	0	—		13	4
Sint-Truiden	2024–25	Belgian Pro League	33	21	3	0	—		36	21
Sint-Truiden	2025–26	Belgian Pro League	1	1	0	0	—		1	1
Sint-Truiden	Total		47	26	3	0	—		50	26
Anderlecht	2025–26	Belgian Pro League	32	6	6	2	4 (Note: Appearances in UEFA Conference League)	0	42	8
Anderlecht	2026–27	Belgian Pro League	4	2	1	1	5 (Note: Appearances in UEFA Europa League)	0	10	3
Anderlecht	Total		36	8	7	3	9	0	52	11
Career total			200	88	16	8	9	0	225	96

== Honours ==
Individual

- Belgian Pro League top scorer: 2024–25 (shared)
