= Fatih Kaya =

German footballer

Personal information
- Date of birth: 13 November 1999 (age 26)
- Place of birth: Giessen, Germany
- Height: 1.83 m (6 ft 0 in)
- Position: Forward

Team information
- Current team: Samsunspor
- Number: 14

Youth career
- TSV Klein-Linden
- VfB Gießen
- –2016: Mainz 05
- 2016–2018: FC Ingolstadt

Senior career*
Years	Team	Apps	(Gls)
2018–2019	FC Ingolstadt II	20	(10)
2018–2022	FC Ingolstadt	91	(13)
2022–2024	Sint-Truiden	54	(2)
2024–2026	SV Wehen Wiesbaden	71	(31)
2026–	Samsunspor	2	(1)

International career^{‡}
2018	Germany U19	1	(0)
- * Club domestic league appearances and goals as of 22 August 2026 ‡ National team caps and goals as of 1 December 2018

Fatih Kaya (born 13 November 1999) is a German professional footballer who plays as a forward for Süper Lig club Samsunspor.

== Club career ==
Kaya began his youth career with TSV Klein-Linde and VfB Gießen, before later moving to the youth academy of Mainz 05. In 2016, he joined the youth team of FC Ingolstadt. In 2018, he began playing for Ingolstadt's reserve side.

Kaya made his professional debut for FC Ingolstadt in the 2. Bundesliga on 1 December 2018, starting in the match against Hamburger SV. He scored Ingolstadt's only goal of the match with a header in the 54th minute via an assist from Sonny Kittel. Kaya was substituted off in the 66th minute for Darío Lezcano, with the match finishing as a 2–1 home loss.

On 25 May 2022, Kaya signed with Belgian club Sint-Truiden.

On 23 July 2024, Kaya joined SV Wehen Wiesbaden in 3. Liga.

On 12 June 2026, Kaya signed with Samsunspor of the Süper Lig.

== International career ==
Born in Germany, Kaya is of Turkish descent. He made his youth international debut for Germany's under-19 team on 25 April 2018, coming on as a half-time substitute in a friendly against Denmark.
