= Joselpho Barnes =

Ghanaian footballer (born 2000)

Personal information
- Date of birth: 12 December 2001 (age 24)
- Place of birth: Oberhausen, Germany
- Height: 1.87 m (6 ft 2 in)
- Position: Forward

Youth career
- 2011–2012: SpVgg Ingelbach
- 2012–2013: SpVgg Lautzert
- 2013–2014: VfL Leverkusen
- 2014–2015: SV Bergisch Gladbach 09
- 2015–2016: Fortuna Köln
- 2016–2020: Schalke 04

Senior career*
Years	Team	Apps	(Gls)
2020–2021	Schalke 04 II	11	(0)
2021	Virton	0	(0)
2021–2023	Riga FC	29	(7)
2023–2025	Sint-Truiden	40	(1)

International career^{‡}
2021	Ghana U20	5	(1)
2021	Ghana U23	2	(1)
- * Club domestic league appearances and goals as of 11 May 2025 ‡ National team caps and goals as of 08:36, 2 August 2023 (UTC)

Joselpho Barnes (born 12 December 2001) is a professional footballer who plays as a forward. Born in Germany, he is a youth international for Ghana.

== Club career ==
Barnes is a youth product of SpVgg Ingelbach, SpVgg Lautzert, VfL Leverkusen, SV Bergisch Gladbach 09, Fortuna Köln before finishing his youth development at Schalke 04. He began his senior career with Schalke 04 II in 2020, but left the club in June 2021 after they could not agree on a contract extension.

Barnes shortly after joined the Belgian club Virton on trial, but after a short period moved to the Latvian club Riga FC. Having scored 7 goals and providing 4 assists in 29 games in Latvia, he transferred back to Belgium with Sint-Truiden on 30 June 2023 for two years.

== International career ==
Born in Germany, Barnes is of Ghanaian descent. He opted to represent Ghana internationally, and played for the Ghana U20s as they won the 2021 U-20 Africa Cup of Nations.

== Personal life ==
Barnes is the son of the Ghana international footballer Sebastian Barnes.

== Honours ==
Ghana U20

- U-20 Africa Cup of Nations: 2021
