= Mathias Delorge =

Belgian footballer (born 2004)

Personal information
- Full name: Mathias Delorge-Knieper
- Date of birth: 31 July 2004 (age 22)
- Place of birth: Sint-Truiden, Belgium
- Height: 1.89 m (6 ft 2 in)
- Position: Midfielder

Team information
- Current team: Gent
- Number: 17

Youth career
- 2009–2010: Heers VV
- 2011–2022: Sint-Truiden

Senior career*
Years	Team	Apps	(Gls)
2022–2024	Sint-Truiden	41	(1)
2023	→ Lierse Kempenzonen (loan)	10	(1)
2024–	Gent	65	(1)

International career^{‡}
2019–2020	Belgium U16	5	(0)
2021	Belgium U18	6	(0)
2023	Belgium U20	2	(0)
2024–	Belgium U21	10	(0)
- * Club domestic league appearances and goals as of 25 October 2026 ‡ National team caps and goals as of 15:27, 18 November 2026 (UTC)

Mathias Delorge-Knieper (born 31 July 2004) is a Belgian professional footballer who plays as a midfielder for Gent.

== Club career ==
Delorge is a youth product of Heers VV before moving to Sint-Truiden's academy in 2011. In November 2020, he started training with the senior team for the first time. On 15 January 2021, he signed his first professional contract with Sint-Truiden and started playing with their reserves. He was a part of the senior team for the preseason in the summer of 2021.

Delorge made his senior and professional debut with Sint-Truiden as a substitute in a 3–0 win over Standard Liège on 10 April 2022. In the summer of 2022 he tore his meniscus, which kept him out for 4 months. On January 31, 2023, he was loaned to Lierse Kempenzonen in the Challenger Pro League for the second half of the season. Making 10 appearances and scoring 1 goal on his loan, Delorge returned to Sint-Truiden for the 2023–24 season.

On 24 July 2024, Delorge signed a four-year contract with Gent.

== International career ==
Delorge is a youth international for Belgium, having played for the Belgium U20s in November 2023.

== Personal life ==
Mathias is the son of Peter Delorge and nephew of Kristof Delorge, both former professional footballers.

== Career statistics ==
As of match played 25 October 2026

Club	Season	League			National Cup		Europe		Other		Total	
Club	Season	Division	Apps	Goals	Apps	Goals	Apps	Goals	Apps	Goals	Apps	Goals
Sint-Truidense	2021–22	Belgian Pro League	1	0	0	0	—		—		1	0
Sint-Truidense	2023–24	Belgian Pro League	40	1	0	0	—		—		40	1
Sint-Truidense	Total		41	1	0	0	—		—		41	1
Lierse Kempenzonen (loan)	2022–23	Challenger Pro League	10	1	0	0	—		—		10	1
Gent	2024–25	Belgian Pro League	38	1	2	0	14 (Note: Appearances in UEFA Conference League)	1	—		54	2
Gent	2025–26	Belgian Pro League	18	0	1	0	—		—		19	0
Gent	2026–27	Belgian Pro League	9	0	1	0	8	0	—		18	0
Gent	Total		65	1	4	0	22	1	—		91	2
Career total			116	3	4	0	22	1	0	0	142	4
