= Mory Konaté =

Guinean footballer (born 1993)

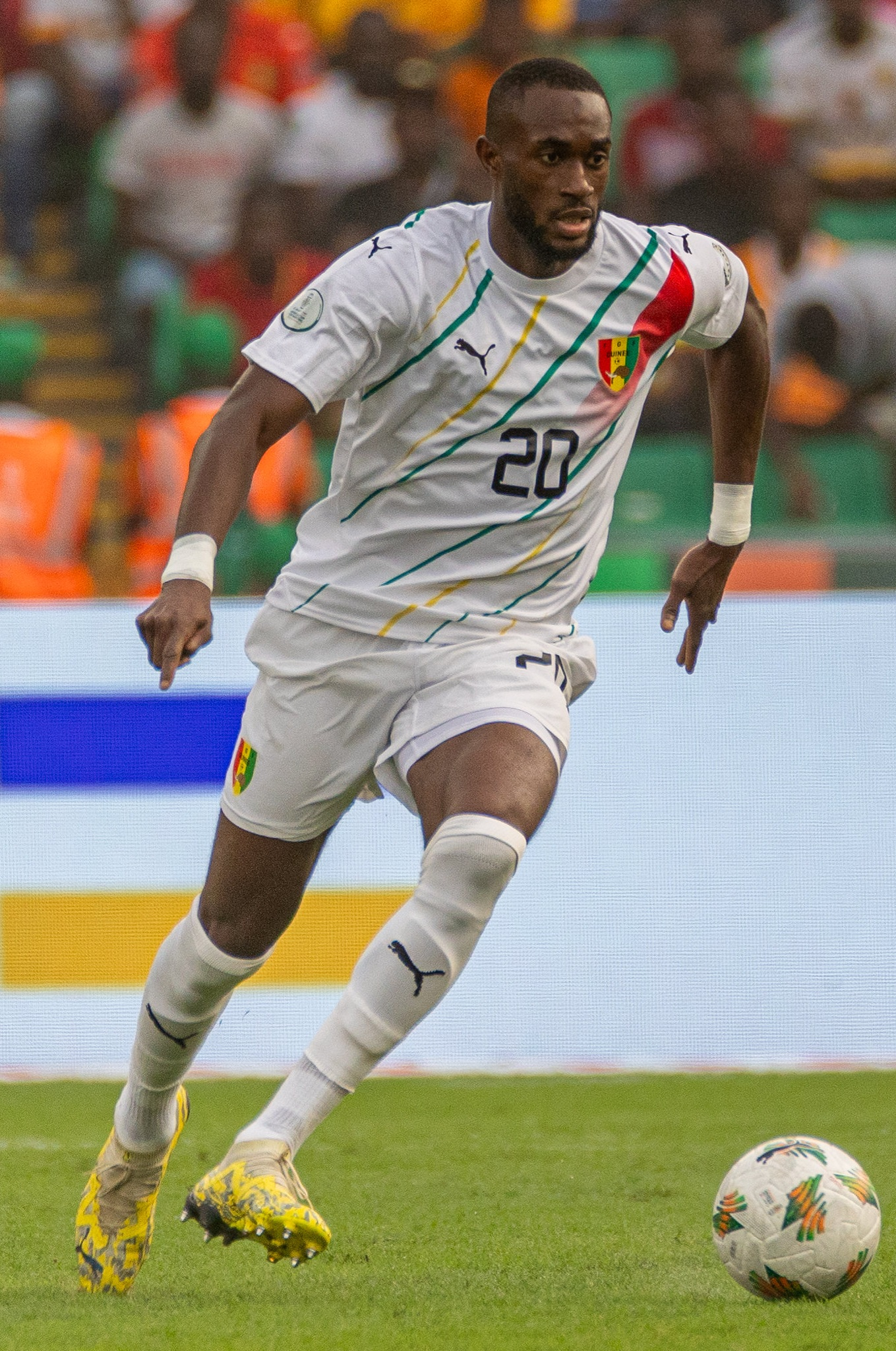
- Konaté with Guinea in 2024

Personal information
- Date of birth: 15 November 1993 (age 32)
- Place of birth: Conakry, Guinea
- Height: 1.91 m (6 ft 3 in)
- Position: Midfielder

Team information
- Current team: Al-Hazem
- Number: 8

Senior career*
Years	Team	Apps	(Gls)
2014–2017	Alfter	62	(9)
2017–2018	TuS Erndtebrück	26	(1)
2018–2019	Borussia Dortmund II	23	(3)
2019–2023	Sint-Truidense	64	(5)
2023–2026	Mechelen	63	(4)
2026–	Al-Hazem	2	(0)

International career^{‡}
2020–	Guinea	11	(0)
- * Club domestic league appearances and goals as of 21 August 2026 ‡ National team caps and goals as of 23:37, 28 January 2024 (UTC)

Mory Konaté (born 15 November 1993) is a Guinean professional footballer who plays as a midfielder for Saudi Pro League club Al-Hazem and the Guinea national team.

== Club career ==
Konaté began playing football late, and moved to Germany as student after his lack of footballing opportunities in Guinea. He began playing amateur football with Alfter in 2014, before signing a contract with Borussia Dortmund II in 2017. On 29 August 2019, Konaté transferred Sint-Truidense. Konaté made his professional debut with Sint-Truidense in a 5–2 Belgian First Division A win over K.A.S. Eupen on 8 February 2020, wherein he scored the opening goal.

On 13 July 2023, Konaté signed a three-season contract with Mechelen.

== International career ==
On 13 March 2020, Konaté was called up to represent the Guinea national team. On 27 December 2021, he was included in Guinea's extended 2021 Africa Cup of Nations squad. He debuted with the Guinea national team in a 3–0 friendly loss to Rwanda on 3 January 2022.

== Personal life ==
Konate is the older brother of fellow football player Sacko Konate.
