= Olivier Dumont =

Belgian footballer

Personal information
- Date of birth: 6 March 2002 (age 24)
- Place of birth: Visé, Belgium
- Height: 1.82 m (6 ft 0 in)
- Position: Midfielder

Team information
- Current team: MVV Maastricht
- Number: 10

Youth career
- 2011–2020: Standard Liège

Senior career*
Years	Team	Apps	(Gls)
2021–2022	Standard Liège	2	(0)
2022–2025	Sint-Truiden	40	(2)
2025–2026	RWDM Brussels	29	(1)
2026–	MVV Maastricht	9	(5)

International career^{‡}
2018–2019	Belgium U17	4	(2)
- * Club domestic league appearances and goals as of 3 October 2026 ‡ National team caps and goals as of 23 July 2021

Olivier Dumont (born 6 March 2002) is a Belgian professional football player who plays for Dutch Eerste Divisie club MVV Maastricht.

== Club career ==
A pure product of Standard Liège youth system, Dumont first joined the club's professional squad in the preparation of the 2021–22 season.

On 11 June 2020, Dumont signed his first professional contract with Standard Liège.

He made his professional debut for Standard Liège on the 23 July 2021, replacing João Klauss in the opening game of the 2021–22 Belgian First Division; a 1–1 home draw against KRC Genk.

On 21 October 2021, Dumont signed a new contract with Standard Liège.

On 8 June 2022, Dumont signed with Sint-Truiden.

On 16 July 2026, Dumont joined MVV Maastricht in the Dutch second tier, in the hometown of his mother.
