= Daichi Hayashi =

Japanese footballer (born 1997)

Personal information
- Date of birth: 23 May 1997 (age 29)
- Place of birth: Osaka, Japan
- Height: 1.78 m (5 ft 10 in)
- Position: Forward

Team information
- Current team: Gamba Osaka
- Number: 9

Youth career
- Senri Hijiri SC
- Gamba Osaka
- 2014–2016: Riseisha High School

College career
| Years | Team | Apps | (Gls) |
| 2017–2020 | Osaka University H&SS | | |

Senior career*
| Years | Team | Apps | (Gls) |
| 2019–2021 | Sagan Tosu | 52 | (14) |
| 2021–2024 | Sint-Truiden | 56 | (14) |
| 2023–2024 | → 1. FC Nürnberg (loan) | 14 | (2) |
| 2024– | Gamba Osaka | 1 | (0) |

International career^{‡}
| 2021 | Japan U23 | 8 | (1) |
- * Club domestic league appearances and goals as of 15 September 2025 ‡ National team caps and goals as of 6 August 2021

Daichi Hayashi (林 大地, Hayashi Daichi; born 23 May 1997) is a Japanese professional footballer who plays as a forward for J1 League club Gamba Osaka.

== Club career ==
=== Sagan Tosu ===
On 3 August 2019, it was announced that Hayashi would join the team for the 2020 season. He scored on his league debut against Cerezo Osaka on 11 August 2019, scoring in the 88th minute.

=== Sint-Truidense ===
On 7 August 2021, Hayashi joined Belgian club Sint-Truidense. He scored on his league debut against Cercle Brugge on 28 August 2021, scoring in the 7th minute.

=== 1. FC Nürnberg ===
On 20 June 2023, Hayashi joined 2. Bundesliga club 1. FC Nürnberg on a season-long loan deal. He made his league debut against Hansa Rostock on 30 July 2023. Hayashi scored his first league goal against Hertha BSC on 22 October 2023, scoring in the 84th minute.

=== Gamba Osaka ===
On 30 June 2024, Hayashi officially returned to J1 League side Gamba Osaka, joining the club on a permanent deal.

== International career ==
Due to an injury to Ritsu Dōan, Hayashi got a callup to the 2021 Saison Card Cup.

Hayashi was called up as a backup player for the 2020 Summer Olympics.

== Career statistics ==
=== Club ===
As of 28 April 2024

Appearances and goals by club, season and competition
| Club | Season | League | | | National Cup | | League Cup | | Continental | | Total | |
| Club | Season | Division | Apps | Goals | Apps | Goals | Apps | Goals | Apps | Goals | Apps | Goals |
|---|---|---|---|---|---|---|---|---|---|---|---|---|
| Sagan Tosu | 2019 | J1 League | 1 | 1 | 0 | 0 | 0 | 0 | 0 | 0 | 1 | 1 |
| Sagan Tosu | 2020 | J1 League | 31 | 9 | 0 | 0 | 1 (Note: Appearances in the J.League Cup) | 0 | 0 | 0 | 32 | 9 |
| Sagan Tosu | 2021 | J1 League | 20 | 4 | 0 | 0 | 1 | 1 | 0 | 0 | 21 | 5 |
| Career total | | | 52 | 14 | 0 | 0 | 2 | 1 | 0 | 0 | 54 | 15 |
| Sint-Truidense | 2021–22 | Belgian Pro League | 25 | 7 | 1 | 0 | – | | – | | 26 | 7 |
| Sint-Truidense | 2022–23 | Belgian Pro League | 31 | 7 | 3 | 1 | – | | – | | 34 | 8 |
| | | | 56 | 14 | 4 | 1 | 0 | 0 | 0 | 0 | 60 | 15 |
| 1. FC Nürnberg | 2023–24 | 2. Bundesliga | 14 | 2 | 3 | 1 | – | | – | | 17 | 3 |
| Career total | | | 122 | 30 | 7 | 2 | 2 | 1 | 0 | 0 | 131 | 33 |
