= Wolke Janssens =

Belgian footballer

Personal information
- Full name: Wolke Johannes Janssens
- Date of birth: 11 January 1995 (age 31)
- Place of birth: Peer, Belgium
- Height: 1.85 m (6 ft 1 in)
- Position: Defender

Team information
- Current team: Sint-Truiden
- Number: 22

Youth career
- 2001–2005: Peer SV
- 2005–2009: Bocholt
- 2009–2014: Genk

Senior career*
Years	Team	Apps	(Gls)
2014–2016	Dessel Sport	59	(9)
2016–	Sint-Truiden	145	(3)
2017–2018	→ Lierse (loan)	18	(1)
- * Club domestic league appearances and goals as of 31 May 2026

Wolke Johannes Janssens (born 11 January 1995) is a Belgian professional footballer who plays for Sint-Truiden as a defender.

Wolke is six years older than his brother Aster Janssens, who also played professional football.
