= Stayen =

Football stadium in Sint-Truiden, Belgium

Daio Wasabi Stayen Stadium
- Hel van Stayen; Staaienveld
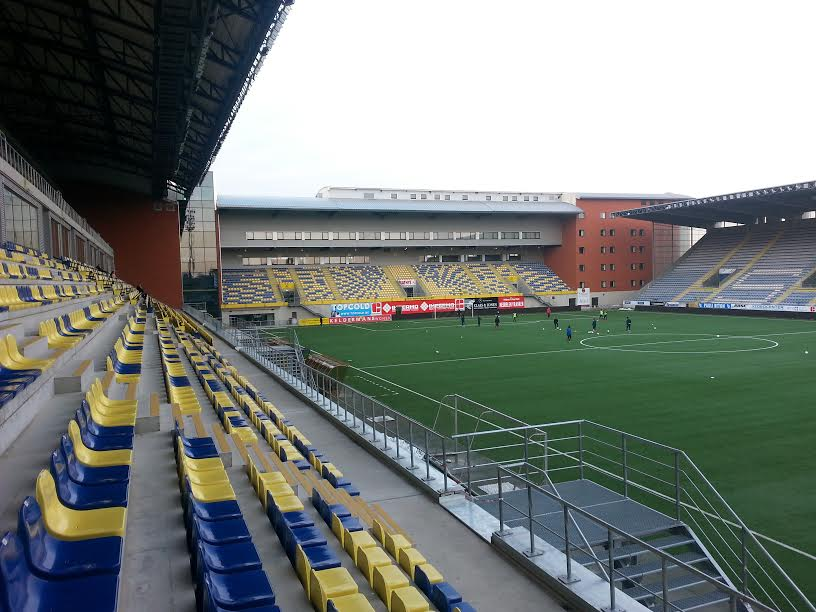
- UEFA Category 4 Stadium
- Interactive map of Daio Wasabi Stayen Stadium
- Location: Sint-Truiden, Belgium
- Coordinates: 50°48′49″N 5°09′59″E
- Capacity: 11,756
- Surface: Synthetic

Construction
- Opened: 1927
- Renovated: 2011

Tenant
- Sint-Truiden

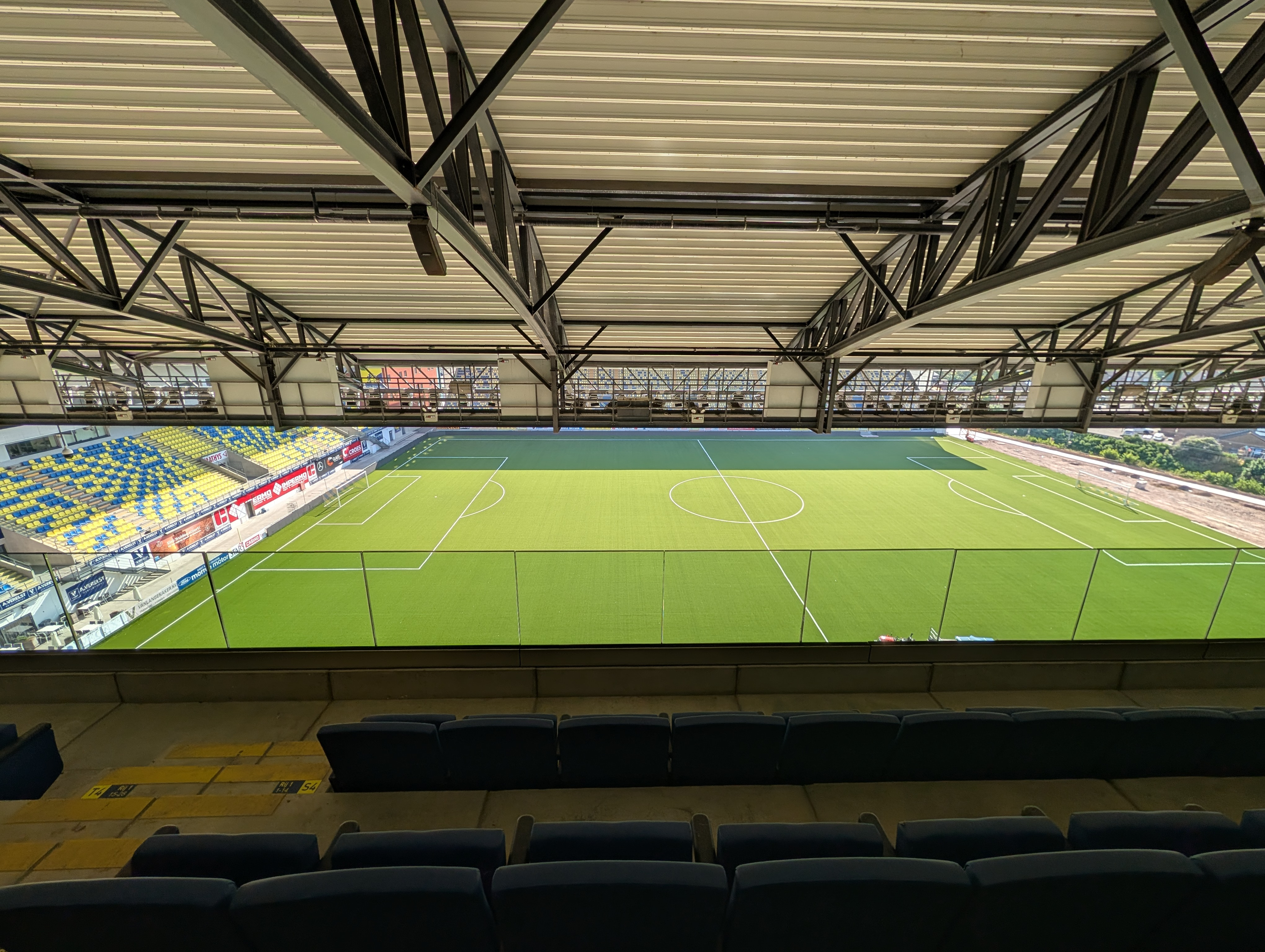
Aerial view of the Stayen stadium from one of the skyboxes.

The Daio Wasabi Stayen Stadium is a stadium in Sint-Truiden, the home ground of Belgian football club Sint-Truidense. Originally constructed in 1927, the stadium holds 14,600 after its most recent rebuild. The Stayen Hotel is built into its north side – 20 of its rooms overlook the pitch.

The name "Stayen" is a local dialect word for "Staden", an old quarter on Sint-Truiden's western side. Between the 1950s and 2009, the word was normally written as "Staaien". One regularly applied soubriquet is "Hel van Stayen" ("Hell of Stayen"), used on behalf of top teams that suffered notable defeats at the stadium.

From February 2023, Daio Wasabi Farm acquired the naming rights of the Stayen, the first by a Japanese firm in Belgian football history, and renamed it "Daio Wasabi Stayen Stadium".
