= 2025–26 KV Mechelen season =

K.V. Mechelen
2025–26 season
- Manager: Frederik Vanderbiest
- Stadium: Achter de Kazerne
- Belgian Pro League: th

The 2025–26 season is the 122nd season in the history of K.V. Mechelen, and the club's seventh consecutive season in the Belgian Pro League. In addition to the domestic league, the team will participate in the Belgian Cup. During the season, he club qualified for the Champions play-offs for the first time in the club's history.

== Summary ==
Fredrik Hammar was named club captain in September 2025.

== Current squad ==
As of 4 February, 2026

Note: Flags indicate national team as defined under FIFA eligibility rules; some limited exceptions apply. Players may hold more than one non-FIFA nationality.

No.	Pos.	Nation	Player
1	GK	BEL	Ortwin De Wolf
2	DF	MAR	Redouane Halhal
3	DF	ESP	José Marsà
4	DF	SEN	Gora Diouf
6	MF	SWE	Fredrik Hammar
7	DF	FRA	Thérence Koudou
8	MF	GUI	Mory Konaté
9	MF	NED	Myron van Brederode
10	MF	BLR	Maksim Kireev
11	MF	BEL	Bilal Bafdili
12	FW	BFA	Hassane Bandé
13	GK	ESP	Nacho Miras
14	FW	BEL	Benito Raman
15	GK	BEL	Tijn Van Ingelgom
17	MF	BEL	Mathis Servais

No.	Pos.	Nation	Player
18	DF	BEL	Ian Struyf
19	FW	SWE	Kerim Mrabti
21	FW	TUR	Halil Özdemir
22	DF	SLO	Lovro Golič
23	DF	MAR	Moncef Zekri
27	FW	BEL	Keano Vanrafelghem
28	FW	NED	Bouke Boersma
29	MF	TOG	Dikeni Salifou
32	GK	BEL	Axel Willockx
33	DF	CUW	Tommy St. Jago
34	FW	BEL	Xavi Everaert
38	FW	ZIM	Bill Antonio
39	MF	BEL	Massimo Decoene
40	MF	MAR	Amine Ouahabi
94	FW	BEL	Mauro Lenaerts

== Transactions ==
=== In ===
Pos.	Player	Transferred from	Notes	Date	Source
DF	(Netherlands) Tommy St. Jago	(Netherlands) Willem II	Transfer	18 June 2025	
DF	(Senegal) Gora Diouf	(Switzerland) FC Sion	Transfer	30 June 2025	
DF	(France) Thérence Koudou	(France) Pau FC	Transfer	23 July 2025	
FW	(Belarus) Maksim Kireev	(Belgium) Lierse	Transfer	25 August 2025	
MF	(Netherlands) Myron van Brederode	(Netherlands) AZ Alkmaar	Transfer	6 September 2025	
MF	(Togo) Dikeni Salifou	(Germany) SV Werder Bremen	Transfer	7 September 2025	
FW	(Belgium) Mathis Servais	(Belgium) Beveren	Transfer	9 September 2025	
FW	(Burkina Faso) Hassane Bandé	(Finland) HJK	Signed after a trial period	23 October 2025	

== Competitions ==
=== Belgian Pro League ===
==== League table ====
Pos	Team	Pld	W	D	L	GF	GA	GD	Pts	Qualification or relegation
3	Sint-Truiden	30	18	3	9	47	35	+12	57	Qualification for the Champions' play-offs
4	Gent	30	13	6	11	49	43	+6	45	Qualification for the Champions' play-offs
5	Mechelen	30	12	9	9	39	37	+2	45	Qualification for the Champions' play-offs
6	Anderlecht	30	12	8	10	43	39	+4	44	Qualification for the Champions' play-offs
7	Genk	30	11	9	10	46	47	−1	42	Qualification for the Europe play-offs

Source: Jupiler Pro League (in Dutch)
Rules for classification: 1) Points; 2) Matches won; 3) Goal difference; 4) Goals scored; 5) Away matches won; 6) Away goal difference; 7) Away goals scored; 8) Play-off.

==== Matches ====
26 July 2025 1	Zulte Waregem	1–1	Mechelen	Elindus Arena
	Vossen 90+9' (pen.)	Report	Lauberbach 16'	Attendance: 6,739; Referee: Kevin Van Damme

1 August 2025 2	K.V. Mechelen	2–1	Club Brugge	Mechelen
20:45	Mrabti 8'; Schoofs 51'	Report	Tzolis 71'	Stadium: Achter de Kazerne; Attendance: 14,275; Referee: Erik Lambrechts

9 August 2025 3	K.V.C. Westerlo	0–1	Mechelen	Het Kuipje
		Report	Raman 84'	Attendance: 6,509; Referee: Michiel Allaerts

16 August 2025 4	Mechelen	1–1	KAA Gent	AFAS Stadion
	Bafdili 17'	Report	Gandelman 64'	Attendance: 11,905; Referee: Nicolas Laforge

24 August 2025 5	Antwerp	2–1	Mechelen	Bosuilstadion
	Somers 27'; Praet (red card) 55'; Doumbia 80'	Report	Koudou 11'	Attendance: 12,818; Referee: Bram Van Driessche

30 August 2025 6	Mechelen	3–2	RAAL La Louvière	AFAS Stadion
	Schoofs 26'; Lauberbach 90', 90+5'	Report	De Wolf 69' (o.g.); Halhal 86' (o.g.)	Attendance: 11,069; Referee: Massimilano Ledda

12 September 2025 7	Standard Liège	1–1	Mechelen	Stade Maurice Dufrasne
	Ilaimaharitra 59' (pen.)	Report	Mrabti 73'	Attendance: 17,220; Referee: Nicolas Laforge

21 September 2025 8	Cercle Brugge K.S.V.	0–0	Mechelen	AFAS Stadion
		Report		Attendance: 11,093; Referee: Bert Verbeke

28 September 2025 9	Royal Charleroi S.C.	0–2	Mechelen	Stade du Pays de Charleroi
		Report	van Brederode 36'; Lauberbach 41'	Attendance: 6,524; Referee: Bram Van Driessche

4 October 2025 10	K.V. Mechelen	1–3	STVV	AFAS Stadion
	Taniguchi 40' (o.g.)	Report	Ferrari 90+5'; Muja 74' (pen.); Gotō 87'	Attendance: 12,122; Referee: Jasper Vergoote

19 October 2025 11	Dender E.H	1–3	Mechelen	Dender Football Complex
	Nsimba 90+7' (pen.)	Report	Konaté 7'; van Brederode 62'; Lauberbach 90+1'	Attendance: 3,341; Referee: Michiel Allaerts

25 October 2025 12	Mechelen	1–1	OH Leuven	AFAS Stadion
	Koudou 74'	Report	Pletinckx 90+5'	Attendance: 11,788; Referee: Kevin Van Damme

1 November 2025 13	Anderlecht	3–1	Mechelen	Constant Vanden Stock Stadium
	Bertaccini 12'; Cvetković 25'; Angulo 60'	Report	Servais 20'	Attendance: 16,295; Referee: Simon Bourdeaud'hui

9 November 2025 14	KV Mechelen	1–1	Union Saint-Gilloise	Mechelen
19:15 CET	Koudou (yellow card) 6'; Marsà (yellow card) 55'; van Brederode 90+3' (pen.) (yellow card) 90+6'		Niang (yellow card) 45+3'; Khalaili (yellow card) 68'; Florucz 85'	Stadium: Achter de Kazerne

23 November 2025 15	KRC Genk	0–1	Mechelen	Cegeka Arena
		Report	Marsà 35'	Attendance: 16,151; Referee: Bram Van Driessche

28 November 2025 16	Mechelen	0–1	Standard Liège	AFAS Stadion
		Report	Eckert 56'	Attendance: 12,944; Referee: Simon Bourdeaud'hui

7 December 2025 17	Mechelen	1–0	Royal Charleroi S.C.	AFAS Stadion
	Koudou 15'	Report		Attendance: 9,683; Referee: Nicolas Laforge

13 December 2025 18	Cercle Brugge	2–3	Mechelen	Jan Breydel Stadium
	Nazinho 46'; Magnée 90+7' (pen.)	Report	Hammar 34'; Lauberbach 39'; Diouf 48'	Attendance: 4,203; Referee: Kevin Van Damme

21 December 2025 19	STVV	1–0	K.V. Mechelen	Stayen
	Van Helden 8'	Report		Attendance: 9,416; Referee: Jan Boterberg

27 December 2025 20	Mechelen	1–1	F.C.V. Dender E.H.	AFAS Stadion
	Koudou 8'	Report	Toshevski 61'; de Fougerolles (yellow card) (red card) 88'	Attendance: 12,443; Referee: Massimilano Ledda

17 January 2026 21	Union Saint-Gilloise	1–0	KV Mechelen	Brussels
20:45 CET	David 35'; Mac Allister (yellow card) 45'; Sykes (yellow card) 76'; Khalaili (yellow card) 90+2'; Scherpen (yellow card) 90+2'		Kireev (yellow card) 31'; Halhal (yellow card) 83'	Stadium: Joseph Marien Stadium; Attendance: 8,000; Referee: Bram Van Driessche

25 January 2026 22	Mechelen	1–1	K.V.C. Westerlo	Achter de Kazerne
	Mrabti 88'	Report	Ferri 16'	Attendance: 12,955; Referee: Erik Lambrechts

1 February 2026 23	OH Leuven	2–2	Mechelen	Den Dreef
	Schrijvers; Ikwuemesi 52'	Report	Servais 61'; Vanrafelghem 79'	Attendance: 5,919; Referee: Lawrence Visser

8 February 2026 24	Mechelen	2–0	Antwerp	Mechelen
19:15 CET (UTC+1)	Van Brederode 11'; Vanrafelghem 65'; Decoene (yellow card) 71'		Verstraeten (yellow card) 62'	Stadium: Achter de Kazerne; Attendance: 14,003; Referee: Lothar D'Hondt

13 February 2026 25	Mechelen	2–3	KRC Genk	Achter de Kazerne
	van Brederode 19'; Mrabti 49'	Report	Bibout 26'; Heynen 61'; Heymans 76' (pen.)	Attendance: 13,769; Referee: Jan Boterberg

22 February 2026 26	RAAL La Louvière	0–2	Mechelen	Easi Arena
	Ashimeru (red card) 18'	Report	Mrabti 37'; Vanrafelghem 49'	Attendance: 4,827; Referee: Michiel Allaerts

28 February 2026 27	Mechelen	2–1	SV Zulte Waregem	Achter de Kazerne
	Halhal 7'; Raman 90+5'	Report	Erenbjerg 71'	Attendance: 14,034; Referee: Jasper Vergoote

8 March 2026 28	KAA Gent	3–1	Mechelen	Planet Group Arena
	Dean 31' (pen.); Lopes 45+2'; Cissé 83'	Report	van Brederode 69'	Attendance: 16,644; Referee: Lothar D'Hondt

15 March 2026 29	Mechelen	1–0	Anderlecht
	van Brederode 91'

22 March 2026 30	Club Brugge	4–1	K.V. Mechelen
	Tresoldi 2'; Sabbe 22', 38'; Mechele 71'		Raman 56'

==== Champions' play-offs ====
===== League table =====
Pos	Team	Pld	W	D	L	GF	GA	GD	Pts	Qualification or relegation	CLU	USG	STR	AND	GNT	MEC
3	Sint-Truiden	10	4	2	4	14	11	+3	43	Qualification for the Europa League play-off round (Note: Union SG won the 2025–26 Belgian Cup and qualified for the Champions League through finishing in the top two, the Europa League play-off round berth was therefore transferred to Sint-Truiden.)	1–2	2–1	—	2–0	1–1	3–0
4	Anderlecht	10	3	2	5	16	23	−7	33	Qualification for the Europa League second qualifying round	1–3	1–3	3–1	—	3–1	2–2
5	Gent (O)	10	0	6	4	4	14	−10	29	Qualification for the European competition play-off	0–2	0–0	0–0	1–1	—	1–1
6	Mechelen	10	1	3	6	9	24	−15	29		2–2	0–1	1–4	1–2	1–0	—

Source: Jupiler Pro League (in Dutch), Soccerway
Legend: Blue = home team win; Yellow = draw; Red = away team win.
Rules for classification: 1) Points; 2) Points without (possible) half points added due to rounding; 3) Regular season finishing position.
(O) Play-off winners

===== Matches =====
6 April 2026 1	KAA Gent	1–1	Mechelen	Planet Group Arena
	Dean 15'	Report	Antonio 90+5'	Attendance: 13,105; Referee: Jan Boterberg

12 April 2026 2	Mechelen	0–1	Union Saint-Gilloise	Mechelen
13:30 CEST	Servais (yellow card) 82'		Sykes 45+2'; Burgess (yellow card) 54'; Khalaili (yellow card) 90+1'; Florucz (yellow card) 90+4'; Pavlić (yellow card) 90+6'	Stadium: Achter de Kazerne

18 April 2026 3	Mechelen	1–2	Anderlecht	Achter de Kazerne
	Boersma 45+8'	Report	Cvetković 62'; Bertaccini 71'	Attendance: 13,827; Referee: Erik Lambrechts

22 April 2026 4	Club Brugge	6–1	Mechelen	Bruges
20:30	Vetlesen 4'; Stanković 46'; Forbs 56'; Tresoldi 60'; Vanaken 78'; Tzolis 90+5' (pen.)	Report	Konaté 10'; Diouf (red card) 90+5'	Stadium: Jan Breydel Stadium; Referee: Bram Van Driessche

26 April 2026 5	Mechelen	1–4	STVV	Achter de Kazerne
	Boersma 26'	Report	Pupe 44'; Merlen 49'; Sebaoui 63'; Itō 75'	Referee: Lawrence Visser

3 May 2026 6	Mechelen	1–0	KAA Gent	Achter de Kazerne
	Boersma 16'	Report		Referee: Simon Bourdeaud'hui

10 May 2026 7	Union Saint-Gilloise	3–0	Mechelen	Brussels
18:30 CEST	Biondic 11'; El Hadj 61'; Fuseini 90+1'	Report		Stadium: Joseph Marien Stadium; Referee: Erik Lambrechts

17 May 2026 8	Anderlecht	2–2	Mechelen	Constant Vanden Stock Stadium
	Saliba 17'; Camara 90+1'	Report	van Brederode 15'; Koudou 60'	Referee: Jan Boterberg

21 May 2026 9	Mechelen	2–2	Club Brugge	Achter de Kazerne
	van Brederode 48'; van den Heuvel 87' (o.g.)	Report	Tzolis 17'; Tresoldi 51'	Referee: Simon Bourdeaud'hui

24 May 2026 10	Sint-Truiden	3–0	Mechelen	Stayen
	Muja 24'; Hata 45+3'; Merlen 71'	Report		Referee: Jasper Vergoote

=== Belgian Cup ===
28 October 2025	Mechelen	2–1	Lierse	Mechelen
20:30 CET	Lauberbach 43'; Van Brederode 74'	Report	Lenaerts 23'	Stadium: Achter de Kazerne

4 December 2025	Charleroi	2–0	Mechelen	Charleroi
20:30 CET	Guiagon 52' (pen.); Nzita 74'	Report		Stadium: Stade du Pays de Charleroi
