= 2025–26 Sint-Truidense VV season =

Sint-Truidense V.V.
2025–26 season
- Manager: Wouter Vrancken
- Stadium: Stayen

The 2025–26 season is the 102nd season in the history of Sint-Truidense V.V., and the club's 11th consecutive season in Belgian Pro League. In addition to the domestic league, the team participated in the Belgian Cup.

== Current squad ==
As of 23 December 2025

Note: Flags indicate national team as defined under FIFA eligibility rules; some limited exceptions apply. Players may hold more than one non-FIFA nationality.

No.	Pos.	Nation	Player
3	DF	JPN	Taiga Hata
4	DF	FRA	Loïc Mbe Soh
5	DF	JPN	Shōgo Taniguchi (captain)
6	MF	JPN	Rihito Yamamoto
7	FW	ALB	Arbnor Muja (on loan from Samsunspor)
8	MF	FRA	Abdoulaye Sissako
10	FW	MAR	Ilias Sebaoui
11	MF	ARG	Isaías Delpupo
12	GK	BEL	Jo Coppens
13	MF	JPN	Ryōtarō Itō
14	MF	FRA	Ryan Merlen
16	GK	JPN	Leo Kokubo
18	DF	NOR	Simen Juklerød

No.	Pos.	Nation	Player
21	GK	BEL	Matt Lendfers
22	DF	BEL	Wolke Janssens
23	DF	BEL	Joedrick Pupe (on loan from Vancouver Whitecaps)
26	DF	MKD	Visar Musliu
31	FW	MAR	Illyès Benachour
33	MF	BEL	Alouis Diriken
34	DF	BEL	Hugo Lambotte
38	MF	JPN	Kaito Matsuzawa
42	FW	JPN	Keisuke Gotō (on loan from Anderlecht)
53	FW	BEL	Adam Nhaili
60	DF	BEL	Robert-Jan Vanwesemael
77	FW	SEN	Oumar Diouf
99	MF	JPN	Shion Shinkawa

=== Out on loan ===
Note: Flags indicate national team as defined under FIFA eligibility rules; some limited exceptions apply. Players may hold more than one non-FIFA nationality.

No.	Pos.	Nation	Player
9	FW	URU	Andrés Ferrari (on loan at Sporting Gijón)
32	FW	BEL	Jay-David Mbalanda (on loan at Olympic Charleroi)

== Transactions ==
=== Transfers in ===
Date	Position	Nationality	Name	From	Ref.
2 June 2025	MF	(France)	Abdoulaye Sissako	(Belgium) K.V. Kortrijk	
18 June 2025	MF	(Morocco)	Ilias Sebaoui	(Netherlands) Feyenoord	
21 June 2025	MF	(France)	Ryan Merlen	(Belgium) RFC Liège	
28 June 2025	MF	(Japan)	Kaito Matsuzawa	(Japan) V-Varen Nagasaki	
4 July 2025	DF	(Japan)	Taiga Hata	(Japan) Shonan Bellmare	
2025	FW	(Uruguay)	Andrés Ferrari	(Spain) Villarreal CF	
16 January 2026	MF	(Japan)	Shion Shinkawa	(Japan) Sagan Tosu	
20 January 2026	FW	(Senegal)	Oumar Diouf	(Belgium) RFC Liège	
21 January 2026	DF	(France)	Loïc Mbe Soh	(Belgium) K Beerschot VA	

=== Loans in ===
Date	Position	Nationality	Name	From	Until	Ref.
7 August 2025	FW	(Japan)	Keisuke Gotō	(Belgium) R.S.C. Anderlecht	End of season	
27 August 2025	MF	(Albania)	Arbnor Muja	(Turkey) Samsunspor	End of season	
29 January 2026	DF	(Belgium)	Joedrick Pupe	(United States) Vancouver Whitecaps FC	End of season	

=== Transfers out ===
Date	Position	Nationality	Name	To	Ref.
23 June 2025	DF	(Japan)	Ryoya Ogawa	(Japan) Kashima Antlers	
31 June 2025	FW	(United States)	Kahveh Zahiroleslam	(Poland) KS Cracovia	
28 July 2025	DF	(Belgium)	Bruno Godeau	(Belgium) S.K. Beveren	
1 August 2025	FW	(Belgium)	Adriano Bertaccini	(Belgium) R.S.C. Anderlecht	
20 August 2025	MF	(Japan)	Joel Chima Fujita	(Germany) FC St. Pauli	
23 August 2025	DF	(Algeria)	Zineddine Belaïd	(Algeria) JS Kabylie	
2025	MF	(Belgium)	Olivier Dumont	(Belgium) RWDM Brussels	
23 January 2026	DF	(Belgium)	Rein Van Helden	(Belgium) Royal Antwerp F.C.	

=== Loans out ===
Date	Position	Nationality	Name	To	Until	Ref.
23 January 2026	FW	(Uruguay)	Andrés Ferrari	(Spain) Sporting de Gijón	End of season	

== Competitions ==
=== Belgian Pro League ===
==== League table ====
Pos	Team	Pld	W	D	L	GF	GA	GD	Pts	Qualification or relegation
1	Union SG	30	19	9	2	50	17	+33	66	Qualification for the Europa League and Champions' play-offs (Note: The regular season winners will qualify for the 2026–27 UEFA Europa League if not earning a 2026–27 UEFA Champions League place in the playoff.)
2	Club Brugge	30	20	3	7	59	36	+23	63	Qualification for the Champions' play-offs
3	Sint-Truiden	30	18	3	9	47	35	+12	57	Qualification for the Champions' play-offs
4	Gent	30	13	6	11	49	43	+6	45	Qualification for the Champions' play-offs
5	Mechelen	30	12	9	9	39	37	+2	45	Qualification for the Champions' play-offs

Source: Jupiler Pro League (in Dutch)
Rules for classification: 1) Points; 2) Matches won; 3) Goal difference; 4) Goals scored; 5) Away matches won; 6) Away goal difference; 7) Away goals scored; 8) Play-off.

==== Matches ====
27 July 2025 1	Sint-Truiden	3–1	KAA Gent	Stayen
	Lopes 77' (o.g.); Bertaccini 88'; Itō 90+6'		Kanga 83' (pen.)	Referee: Put Bel

3 August 2025 2	Charleroi	1–1	Sint-Truiden	Charleroi
19:15 UTC+2	Štulić 41' (yellow card) 59' (red card) 65'		Ito 24' (pen.)	Stadium: Stade du Pays de Charleroi; Attendance: 6,000; Referee: Kevin Van Damme

8 August 2025 3	Sint-Truiden	2–0	Dender EH	Stayen
	Ferrari 28' (pen.); Itō 53'	Report	de Fougerolles (red card) 49'	Attendance: 5,432; Referee: Massimiliano Ledda

17 August 2025 4	Sint-Truiden	2–1	La Louvière	Sint-Truiden
16:00	Vanwesemael 20'; Goto 90+1'		Mendy 70'	Stadium: Stayen; Attendance: 6,047; Referee: Bert Verbeke

23 August 2025 5	SV Zulte Waregem	0–2	Sint-Truiden	Elindus Arena
	Hedl (red card) 52'		Yamamoto 72'; Gotō 81'	Attendance: 6,785; Referee: Kevin Van Damme

29 August 2025 6	Cercle Brugge K.S.V.	1–1	Sint-Truiden	Jan Breydel Stadium
	Minda 30'		Sebaoui 38'	Attendance: 4,761; Referee: Nicolas Laforge

14 September 2025 7	Sint-Truiden	0–3	Westerlo	Stayen
			Ferri 39'; Yow 50' (pen.); Bayram 58'	Attendance: 7,737; Referee: Bram Van Driessche

21 September 2025 8	Club Brugge	2–0	Sint-Truiden	Jan Breydel Stadium
	Mechele 45+1'; Tresoldi 59'	Report		Attendance: 20,759; Referee: Lothar D'Hondt

28 September 2025 9	Sint-Truiden	1–2	KRC Genk	Stayen
	Heynen 4' (o.g.); Van Helden (red card) 54'		Itō 57'; Oh 90+5'	Attendance: 10,129; Referee: Lawrence Visser

4 October 2025 10	K.V. Mechelen	1–3	Sint-Truiden	AFAS Stadion
	Taniguchi 40' (o.g.)	Report	Ferrari 90+5'; Muja 74' (pen.); Gotō 87'	Attendance: 12,122; Referee: Jasper Vergoote

19 October 2025 11	Sint-Truiden	2–2	Anderlecht	Stayen
	Yamamoto 18'; Matsuzawa 76'	Report	De Cat 11'; Cvetković 19'	Attendance: 9,466; Referee: Nicolas Laforge

26 October 2025 12	Union Saint-Gilloise	2–0	Sint-Truiden	Brussels
19:15 CET	Rodríguez 64'; Ait El Hadj (yellow card) 78'; Rodríguez 90+1'		Sebaoui (yellow card) 13'; Sissako (yellow card) 25'	Stadium: Joseph Marien Stadium

2 November 2025 13	Sint-Truiden	1–0	Antwerp	Sint-Truiden
18:30 CET (UTC+1)	Muja (yellow card) 13'; Ito 16'; Goto (yellow card) 71'; Kokubo (yellow card) 84'		Diawara (yellow card) 17'; Foulon (red card) 22'; Benítez (yellow card) 70'	Stadium: Stayen; Attendance: 6,489; Referee: Nathan Verboomen

9 November 2025 14	Sint-Truiden	1–0	Standard Liège	Stayen
	Gotō 57'	Report		Attendance: 8,499; Referee: Nicolas Laforge

23 November 2025 15	OH Leuven	1–2	Sint-Truiden	Den Dreef
	Verlinden 45+4'	Report	Itō 21' (pen.); Sebaoui 41'	Attendance: 5,592; Referee: Bert Verbeke

30 November 2025 16	KAA Gent	1–2	Sint-Truiden	Planet Group Arena
	Kanga 21'	Report	Muja 59'; Gotō 66'	Attendance: 11,985; Referee: Lawrence Visser

6 December 2025 17	Sint-Truiden	3–2	Club Brugge	Stayen
20:45	Muja 22'; Itō 32'; Ferrari 81'		Onyedika 16'; Furo 70'	Attendance: 10,076; Referee: Bram Van Driessche

13 December 2025 18	Anderlecht	2–1	Sint-Truiden	Constant Vanden Stock Stadium
	Saliba 68'; Angulo 71'	Report	Gotō 53'	Attendance: 15,845; Referee: Lothar D'Hondt

21 December 2025 19	Sint-Truiden	1–0	K.V. Mechelen	Stayen
	Van Helden 8'	Report		Attendance: 9,416; Referee: Jan Boterberg

26 December 2025 20	Standard Liège	1–2	Sint-Truiden	Stade Maurice Dufrasne
	Nielsen 20'; Nkada (red card) 25'	Report	Gotō 35', 63'	Attendance: 18,293; Referee: Jasper Vergoote

18 January 2026 21	Sint-Truiden	1–0	OH Leuven	Stayen
	Sebaoui 9'	Report		Attendance: 6,004; Referee: Massimilano Leeda

24 January 2026 22	RAAL La Louvière	1–2	Sint-Truiden	Easi Arena
	Fall 59'	Report	Taniguchi 63'; Diouf 89'	Attendance: 5,221; Referee: Kevin Van Damme

31 January 2026 23	Sint-Truiden	0–2	Charleroi	Sint-Truiden
20:45 UTC+2	Sebaoui (yellow card) 36'; Muja (red card) 39'; Gotō (yellow card) 80'	Report	Camara (yellow card) 36'; Bernier (yellow card) 40'; Khalifi (yellow card) 55'; Titraoui 62'; Romsaas 84'	Stadium: Stayen; Referee: Bert Verbeke

6 February 2026 24	Westerlo	0–4	Sint-Truiden	Het Kuipje
	Ourega (yellow card) (red card) 76'	Report	Yamamoto 10', 42'; Sissako 31'; Gotō 82'	Attendance: 5,629; Referee: Wesli De Cremer

15 February 2026 25	Sint-Truiden	3–2	SV Zulte Waregem	Stayen
	Gotō 45+1'; Juklerød 45+6'; Soh 85'	Report	Opoku 18', 25'; Kiilerich (red card) 44'	Attendance: 6,238; Referee: Nathan Verboomen

21 February 2026 26	FC Dender	1–4	Sint-Truiden	Dender Football Complex
	Mbamba 1'	Report	Sebaoui 24'; Itō 34'; Yamamoto 67'; Muja 87'	Attendance: 1,702; Referee: Simon Bourdeaud'hui

28 February 2026 27	Antwerp	1–0	Sint-Truiden	Antwerp
18:15 CET (UTC+1)	Janssen (yellow card) 26'; Van Den Bosch (yellow card) 45'; Valencia 51'		Muja (yellow card) 3'	Stadium: Bosuilstadion; Attendance: 13,272; Referee: Wesli De Cremer

8 March 2026 28	Sint-Truiden	2–1	Cercle Brugge	Stayen
	Muja 24'; Matsuzawa 81'	Report	Diop 57'	Attendance: 7,023; Referee: Bert Verbeke

15 March 2026 29	KRC Genk	1–0	Sint-Truiden	Cegeka Arena
	El Ouahdi 20'	Report		Attendance: 22,668; Referee: Lothar D'Hondt

22 March 2026 30	Sint-Truiden	1–3	Royale Union Saint-Gilloise	Stayen
	Diouf 79'	Report	Burgess 23'; Sykes 27'; Zeneli 56'	Attendance: 10,176; Referee: Jasper Vergoote

==== Champions' play-offs ====
===== League table =====
Pos	Team	Pld	W	D	L	GF	GA	GD	Pts	Qualification or relegation
1	Club Brugge (C)	10	8	1	1	32	9	+23	57	Qualification for the Champions League league phase
2	Union SG	10	6	2	2	16	10	+6	53	Qualification for the Champions League third qualifying round
3	Sint-Truiden	10	4	2	4	14	11	+3	43	Qualification for the Europa League play-off round (Note: Union SG won the 2025–26 Belgian Cup and qualified for the Champions League through finishing in the top two, the Europa League play-off round berth was therefore transferred to Sint-Truiden.)
4	Anderlecht	10	3	2	5	16	23	−7	33	Qualification for the Europa League second qualifying round
5	Gent (O)	10	0	6	4	4	14	−10	29	Qualification for the European competition play-off

Source: Jupiler Pro League (in Dutch), Soccerway
Rules for classification: 1) Points; 2) Points without (possible) half points added due to rounding; 3) Regular season finishing position.
(C) Champions; (O) Play-off winners

===== Matches =====
4 April 2026 1	Royale Union Saint-Gilloise	1–0	Sint-Truiden	Joseph Marien Stadium
	Smith 62'

11 April 2026 2	Sint-Truiden	1–2	Club Brugge	Stayen
	Itō 22'	Report	Vetlesen 48'; Tzolis 80' (pen.)	Referee: Lothar D'Hondt

19 April 2026 3	KAA Gent	0–0	Sint-Truiden	Planet Group Arena
		Report		Attendance: 12,257; Referee: Jasper Vergoote

23 April 2026 4	Sint-Truiden	2–0	Anderlecht	Stayen
	Gotō 75'; Merlen 90+2'	Report		Referee: Simon Bourdeaud'hui

26 April 2026 5	K.V. Mechelen	1–4	Sint-Truiden	Achter de Kazerne
	Boersma 26'	Report	Pupe 44'; Merlen 49'; Sebaoui 63'; Itō 75'	Referee: Lawrence Visser

2 May 2026 6	Sint-Truiden	2–1	Royale Union Saint-Gilloise	Stayen
	Diouf 86'; Itō 90+10'	Report	Mac Allister (red card) 12'; Rodríguez 90+2'	Referee: Jan Boterberg

9 May 2026 7	Club Brugge	2–0	Sint-Truiden	Jan Breydel Stadium
	Tresoldi 13'; Forbs 52'	Report	Merlen (red card) 63'	Referee: Jasper Vergoote

16 May 2026 8	Sint-Truiden	1–1	KAA Gent	Stayen
	Soh 69'	Report	Kanga 45'	Referee: Lawrence Visser

21 May 2026 9	Anderlecht	3–1	Sint-Truiden	Constant Vanden Stock Stadium
	Sikan 20', 45+2'; Bertaccini 90+2'	Report	Sissako 77'	Referee: Nicolas Laforge

24 May 2026 10	Sint-Truiden	3–0	Mechelen	Stayen
	Muja 24'; Hata 45+3'; Merlen 71'	Report		Referee: Jasper Vergoote

=== Belgian Cup ===
30 October 2025	Knokke	0–1	Sint-Truiden	Knokke
20:30 CET		Report	Diriken 49'	Stadium: Burgemeester Graaf Leopold Lippens Park

3 December 2025	Antwerp	3–3 (a.e.t.) (4–3 p)	Sint-Truiden	Antwerp
20:30 CET	Kerk 15', 62'; Scott 21'	Report	Gotō 17', 69'; Vanwesemael 45+4'	Stadium: Bosuilstadion
	Penalties
	Janssen (penalty scored); Corbanie (penalty scored); Babadi (penalty scored); Van Den Bosch (penalty scored)		(penalty missed) Merlen; (penalty scored) Ferrari; (penalty scored) Musliu; (penalty scored) Janssens; (penalty missed) Sebaoui
