= 2026–27 Sint-Truidense VV season =

Sint-Truidense VV
2026–27 season
- Belgian Pro League: Pre-season
- Belgian Cup: Pre-season
- UEFA Europa League: Play-off round

The 2026–27 season is the 103rd season in the history of Koninklijke Sint-Truidense Voetbalvereniging and their 12th consecutive season in the Belgian top division. The club will also compete in the Belgian Cup and, for the first time, the UEFA Europa League.

== Transfers ==
=== In ===
Pos.	Player	Transferred from	Fee	Date	Source
DF	(Belgium) Joedrick Pupe	(Canada) Vancouver Whitecaps FC	Loan made permanent	1 July 2026	

=== Out ===
Pos.	Player	Transferred to	Fee	Date	Source
FW	(Japan) Keisuke Gotō	(Belgium) Anderlecht	Loan return	30 June 2026	
DF	(Norway) Simen Juklerød	(Slovakia) DAC 1904 Dunajská Streda	Free	1 July 2026	
MF	(Japan) Rihito Yamamoto	(Germany) SC Freiburg	Undisclosed	1 July 2026	

== Pre-season and friendlies ==
1 July 2026 Friendly	Thes Sport (Belgium)	1–2	(Belgium) Sint-Truiden
19:30	1'		6'; 38'

4 July 2026 Friendly	VV Zepperen-Brustem (Belgium)	0–6	(Belgium) Sint-Truiden
17:00			6'; 15'; 33'; 49'; 65'; 69'

15 July 2026 Friendly	Patro Eisden Maasmechelen (Belgium)	0–4	(Belgium) Sint-Truiden
18:30

18 July 2026 Friendly	Luzern (Switzerland)	1–2	(Belgium) Sint-Truiden
14:30

22 July 2026 Friendly	RFC Liège (Belgium)	0–1	(Belgium) Sint-Truiden
18:00

25 July 2026 Friendly	Sint-Truiden (Belgium)	0–0	(United Arab Emirates) Al Jazira
16:00

== Competitions ==
=== Overall record ===
Competition	First match	Last match	Starting round	Record							
Competition	First match	Last match	Starting round	Pld	W	D	L	GF	GA	GD	Win %
Belgian Pro League	7–9 August 2026		Matchday 1	0	0	0	0	0	0	+0	—
Belgian Cup				0	0	0	0	0	0	+0	—
UEFA Europa League	20 August 2026		Play-off round	0	0	0	0	0	0	+0	—
Total				0	0	0	0	0	0	+0	—

Source: Competitions

=== Belgian Pro League ===
Pos	Team	Pld	W	D	L	GF	GA	GD	Pts	Qualification or relegation
13	Beveren	11	3	1	7	13	23	−10	10	
14	OH Leuven	10	2	3	5	10	17	−7	9	
15	Sint-Truiden	10	2	2	6	18	21	−3	8	
16	La Louvière	10	2	1	7	13	23	−10	7	
17	Cercle Brugge	10	1	3	6	13	22	−9	6	Relegation to Challenger Pro League

Updated to match(es) played on 6 November 2026. Source: Jupiler Pro League (in Dutch)
Rules for classification: 1) Points; 2) Matches won; 3) Goal difference; 4) Goals scored; 5) Away matches won; 6) Away goal difference; 7) Away goals scored; 8) Play-off.

==== Matches ====
The league schedule was released on 18 June 2026.

8 August 2026 1	Sint-Truidense	1–1	Lommel	Sint-Truiden
20:45 CEST (UTC+2)	Sebaoui 64'; Ishiwatari (yellow card) 75'	Report	Seuntjens 24' (pen.)	Stadium: Stayen; Attendance: 6,421; Referee: Anthony Letellier

14 August 2026 2	Cercle Brugge	3–3	Sint-Truidense	Bruges
20:45 CEST (UTC+2)	Ngoura 28'; Nunes 82'; Soh 90+3' (o.g.)	Report	Merlen 1', 37'; Ishiwatari (yellow card) 18', (goal) 47'; Pupe (yellow card) 57'; Soh (yellow card) 79'	Stadium: Jan Breydel Stadium; Attendance: 4,068; Referee: Jan Boterberg

30 August 2026 3	Antwerp	1–4	Sint-Truidense	Antwerp
16:00 CEST	Schelfhout (yellow card) 2'; Porozo 58'	Report	Araki 9'; Kokubo (yellow card) 28'; Baždar 73', 90', (yellow card) 79'; Matsuzawa 76'; Merlen (yellow card) 78'	Stadium: Bosuilstadion; Attendance: 15,089; Referee: Bram Van Driessche

2 September 2026 4	Sint-Truidense	0–3	Union Saint-Gilloise	Sint-Truiden
20:30 CEST	Sissako (yellow card) 47'; Vanwesemael (yellow card) 49'; Ishiwatari (yellow card) 54'	Report	Mac Allister (yellow card) 21', (goal) 55'; Patris 23'; Van de Perre (yellow card) 61'; Mofokeng 63'	Stadium: Stayen; Attendance: 6,918; Referee: Nathan Verboomen

5 September 2026 5	Sint-Truidense	4–0	La Louvière	Sint-Truiden
20:45 CEST	Sebaoui (yellow card) 13'; Merlen 41'; Vanwesemael 54'; Baždar 73', 78'	Report	Isah (yellow card) 9'; Delos (yellow card) 61'	Stadium: Stayen; Attendance: 6,323; Referee: Bert Verbeke

12 September 2026 6	Beveren	2–0	Sint-Truidense	Beveren
16:00 CEST	Lokesa 52' (pen.); Margaritha 55'; Janssens (yellow card) 84'; Slegers (yellow card) 86'	Report		Stadium: Freethiel Stadion; Attendance: 5,071; Referee: Kevin Van Damme

20 September 2026 7	Sint-Truidense	0–2	Westerlo	Sint-Truiden
16:00 CEST	Musliu (yellow card) 73'	Report	Bassette 36', (yellow card) 73'; Sandra 46'	Stadium: Stayen; Attendance: 8,692; Referee: Massimiliano Ledda

11 October 2026 8	Mechelen	4–3	Sint-Truidense	Mechelen
19:15 CEST	Takai 24' (o.g.); Michez 34'; Taniguchi 39' (o.g.); Decherf (yellow card) 53'; Raman 62'; Hammar (yellow card) 90+5'	Report	Takai (yellow card) 5'; Matsuzawa (yellow card) 42'; Baždar 44'; Sebaoui 49'; Soèllé 71'; Ishiwatari (yellow card) 84'; Taniguchi (yellow card) 88'	Stadium: AFAS-stadion Achter de Kazerne; Attendance: 11,300; Referee: Bert Verbeke

25 October 2026 9	Club Brugge	3–2	Sint-Truidense	Bruges
16:00 CET	Tresoldi 41', 43', 75'	Report	Sebaoui 55' (pen.); Vanwesemael (yellow card) 70' (yellow-red card) 90+5'; Merlen (yellow card) 88'; Taniguchi 90+3'; Muja (yellow card) 90+5'	Stadium: Jan Breydel Stadium; Attendance: 21,900; Referee: Nathan Verboomen

1 November 2026 10	Sint-Truidense	1–2	OH Leuven	Sint-Truiden
15:00 CET	Sebaoui (penalty missed) 24'; Mbuku (penalty missed) 32', 46'; Matsuzawa (yellow card) 84'	Report	Mirisola 53'; Lawrence (yellow card) 55'; Opoku 81', (yellow card) 88'; Nyakossi (yellow card) 90+3'	Stadium: Stayen; Attendance: 6,114; Referee: Michiel Allaerts

=== UEFA Europa League ===
==== Play-off round ====
20 August 2026	Sint-Truiden (Belgium)	1–0	(Cyprus) Omonia	Stayen, Sint-Truiden
20:00	Vanwesemael (yellow card) 49'; Taniguchi 90+4'	Report	Duverne (yellow card) 51'; Ewandro (yellow card) 85'	Attendance: 6,214; Referee: Georgi Kabakov (Bulgaria)

27 August 2026	Omonia (Cyprus)	4–2 (4–3 agg.)	(Belgium) Sint-Truiden	GSP Stadium, Nicosia, Cyprus
19:00 (20:00 UTC+3)	Diony 16' (pen.), 29', 50'; Coulibaly (yellow card) 32'; Panagiotou 83'	Report	Taniguchi (yellow card) 9'; Sebaoui 33' (pen.), 90+2', (yellow card) 40'; Baždar (yellow card) 64'; Sissako (yellow card) 83'; Diouf (yellow card) 87'	Attendance: 15,008; Referee: Damian Sylwestrzak (Poland)

=== UEFA Conference League ===
==== League phase ====
The league phase draw took place on 28 August 2026

Pos	Team	Pld	W	D	L	GF	GA	GD	Pts	Qualification
8	(Romania) Universitatea Craiova	3	2	1	0	6	2	+4	7	Advance to round of 16 (seeded)
9	(Sweden) Mjällby AIF	3	2	1	0	5	1	+4	7	Advance to knockout phase play-offs (seeded)
10	(Belgium) Sint-Truiden	3	2	1	0	4	1	+3	7	Advance to knockout phase play-offs (seeded)
11	(Netherlands) Ajax	3	2	0	1	9	3	+6	6	Advance to knockout phase play-offs (seeded)
12	(Turkey) Trabzonspor	3	2	0	1	6	3	+3	6	Advance to knockout phase play-offs (seeded)

Updated to match(es) played on 5 November 2026. Source: UEFA
Rules for classification: League phase tiebreakers

Round	1	2	3	4	5	6
Ground	H	A	H	A	H	A
Result	W	W	D			
Position		7	10			
Points	3	6	7			

Updated to match(es) played on 5 November 2026. Source: UEFA
A = Away; H = Home; W = Win; D = Draw; L = Loss

Win Draw Loss Fixtures

15 October 2026 1	Sint-Truidense (Belgium)	2–0	(Georgia (country)) Iberia 1999	Sint-Truiden, Belgium
21:00 CEST	Vanwesemael 12'; Ishwatari (yellow card) 36'; Sebaoui 88'	Report		Stadium: Stayen; Attendance: 5,185; Referee: Mehmet Türkmen (Turkey)

22 October 2026 2	Midtjylland (Denmark)	0–1	(Belgium) Sint-Truidense	Herning, Denmark
21:00 CEST	Bravo (yellow card) 22'	Report	Vanwesemael (yellow card) 9'; Soèllé 42'; Sebaoui (yellow card) 59'	Stadium: MCH Arena, Herning; Attendance: 7,336; Referee: Juxhin Xhaja (Albania)

5 November 2026 3	Sint-Truidense (Belgium)	1–1	(Norway) Brann	Sint-Truiden, Belgium
21:00 CET	Ishiwatari 48'; Muja (yellow card) 77'	Report	Mathisen 79'; Magnússon (yellow card) 89'	Stadium: Stayen; Attendance: 6,415; Referee: Oliver Reitala (Finland)
