= 2026 AFC U-23 Asian Cup qualification =

Age restricted continental qualification competition

تصفيات كأس آسيا 23 سنة 2026

Tournament details
- Host countries: Jordan (Group A); Myanmar (Group B); Vietnam (Group C); China (Group D); Kyrgyzstan (Group E); Thailand (Group F); Cambodia (Group G); Qatar (Group H); United Arab Emirates (Group I); Indonesia (Group J); Tajikistan (Group K)
- Dates: 3–9 September 2025
- Teams: 44 (from 1 confederation)
- Venues: 11 (in 11 host cities)

Tournament statistics
- Matches played: 66
- Goals scored: 271 (4.11 per match)
- Top scorer(s): (Australia) Nathanael Blair (Jordan) Odeh Al-Fakhouri (Iran) Kasra Taheri (5 goals)

The 2026 AFC U-23 Asian Cup qualification was an international men's under-23 football competition which decided the participating teams of the 2026 AFC U-23 Asian Cup.

A total of 16 teams qualified to play in the final tournament, including Saudi Arabia who qualified automatically as host country.

== Draw ==
Of the 47 AFC member associations, a total of 45 teams entered the competition.

A draw was held on 29 May 2025, at 15:00 (UTC+8) on the AFC House in Kuala Lumpur, Malaysia.

The teams were seeded based on a points system derived from their final rankings across the previous three editions of the Finals (2020, 2022, and 2024). Teams that indicated their intention to serve as qualification group hosts before the draw were placed in separate groups. Saudi Arabia automatically qualified for the final tournament as hosts, thus the remaining 44 teams entered the qualification.

	Pot 1	Pot 2	Pot 3	Pot 4
Host pot	Vietnam (5); Qatar (7); Thailand (8); Jordan (9); Tajikistan (10); United Arab Emirates (11)	Indonesia (12); China (17); Cambodia (22)	Myanmar (23); Kyrgyzstan (26)	
Remaining Teams	Uzbekistan (1); Japan (2); Iraq (3); South Korea (4); Australia (6)	Kuwait (13); Iran (14); Turkmenistan (15); Malaysia (16); Bahrain (18); Palestine (19); Syria (20); Yemen (21)	Oman (24); Singapore (25); India (27); Lebanon (28); Laos (29); Timor-Leste (30); Chinese Taipei (31); Philippines (32); Hong Kong (33)	Afghanistan (34); Bangladesh (35); Mongolia (36); Guam (37); Pakistan (38); Macau (39); Nepal (40); Brunei (41); Sri Lanka (42); Bhutan (43); Northern Mariana Islands (44)

Did not enter
- Maldives
- North Korea

== Eligibility ==
Players born on or after 1 January 2003 were eligible to participate, in accordance with the age criteria set by the Asian Football Confederation.

== Format ==
The 44 teams were divided into eleven groups of four teams each. In each group, teams played each other once at a centralized venue. The eleven group winners and the four best runners-up qualified for the final tournament.

=== Tiebreakers ===
Teams were ranked according to points (3 points for a win, 1 point for a draw, 0 points for a loss), and if tied on points, the following tiebreaking criteria were applied, in the order given, to determine the rankings:

1. Points in head-to-head matches among tied teams;
2. Goal difference in head-to-head matches among tied teams;
3. Goals scored in head-to-head matches among tied teams;
4. If more than two teams were tied, and after applying all head-to-head criteria above, a subset of teams were still tied, all head-to-head criteria above were reapplied exclusively to this subset of teams;
5. Goal difference in all group matches;
6. Goals scored in all group matches;
7. Penalty shoot-out if only two teams were tied and they met in the last round of the group;
8. Lower disciplinary points (yellow card = 1 point, red card as a result of two yellow cards = 3 points, direct red card = 3 points, yellow card followed by direct red card = 4 points);
9. Drawing of lots.

== Groups ==
All matches were played between 3 and 9 September 2025.

=== Group A ===
- All matches were held in Jordan.
- Times listed are UTC+3.

Pos	Team	Pld	W	D	L	GF	GA	GD	Pts	Qualification
1	Jordan (H)	3	3	0	0	19	1	+18	9	Final tournament
2	Turkmenistan	3	2	0	1	8	3	+5	6	
3	Bhutan	3	1	0	2	3	14	−11	3	
4	Chinese Taipei	3	0	0	3	2	14	−12	0	

Source: AFC
Rules for classification: Qualification tiebreakers
(H) Hosts
3 September 2025
17:00

Turkmenistan	5–1	Chinese Taipei
Meredow 19', 43', 48'; Durdyýew 32'; Annamyradow 90+2'	Report	Wei Chih-chuan 40'

Amman International Stadium, Amman
Attendance: 30
Referee: Songkran Bunmeekiart (Thailand)
3 September 2025
19:00

Jordan	11–0	Bhutan
Al-Fakhouri 3', 48', 56'; Sabra 15', 45', 51'; Abu Hazeem 18'; Al-Saket 79'; Al-Samamreh 90'; Al-Shanaineh 90+2'; Al-Mnayyes 90+4'	Report

King Abdullah II Stadium, Amman
Attendance: 1,250
Referee: Payam Heydari (Iran)

6 September 2025
17:00

Bhutan	0–2	Turkmenistan
	Report	Durdyýew 12' (pen.); Meredow 90+3'

Amman International Stadium, Amman
Attendance: 20
Referee: Mohamed Khaled (Bahrain)
6 September 2025
19:00

Chinese Taipei	0–6	Jordan
	Report	Al-Saket 32', 52'; Al-Fakhouri 36'; Al-Azaizeh 43'; Abu Hazeem 45+1'; Huang Chun-lin 81' (o.g.)

King Abdullah II Stadium, Amman
Attendance: 850
Referee: Nivon Robesh Gamini (Sri Lanka)

9 September 2025
16:00

Chinese Taipei	1–3	Bhutan
Lin Chen 33'	Report	Tenzin 62'; S. Dorji 81'; J. Dorji 90+1'

King Abdullah II Stadium, Amman
Attendance: 10
Referee: Payam Heydari (Iran)
9 September 2025
19:00

Jordan	2–1	Turkmenistan
Al-Azaizeh 27'; Al-Fakhouri 67' (pen.)	Report	Berenow 90+4'

King Abdullah II Stadium, Amman
Attendance: 950
Referee: Abdullah Jamali (Kuwait)

=== Group B ===
- All matches were held in Myanmar.
- Times listed are UTC+6:30.

Pos	Team	Pld	W	D	L	GF	GA	GD	Pts	Qualification
1	Japan	3	3	0	0	11	2	+9	9	Final tournament
2	Kuwait	3	1	1	1	2	6	−4	4	
3	Afghanistan	3	1	0	2	2	5	−3	3	
4	Myanmar (H)	3	0	1	2	2	4	−2	1	

Source: AFC
Rules for classification: Qualification tiebreakers
(H) Hosts
3 September 2025
16:00

Kuwait	0–0	Myanmar
	Report

Thuwunna Stadium, Yangon
Attendance: 1,800
Referee: Nasrullo Kabirov (Tajikistan)
3 September 2025
19:00

Japan	3–0	Afghanistan
Shinkawa 8'; Nawata 42'; Goto 90+4'	Report

Thuwunna Stadium, Yangon
Attendance: 340
Referee: Tuan Yaasin (Malaysia)

6 September 2025
16:00

Myanmar	1–2	Japan
Swan Htet 80'	Report	Okabe 52'; Nawata 90+2' (pen.)

Thuwunna Stadium, Yangon
Attendance: 7,300
Referee: Veronika Bernatskaia (Kyrgyzstan)
6 September 2025
19:00

Afghanistan	0–1	Kuwait
	Report	M. Al-Enezi 47'

Thuwunna Stadium, Yangon
Attendance: 37
Referee: Ahmed Eisa Darwish (United Arab Emirates)

9 September 2025
16:00

Myanmar	1–2	Afghanistan
Swan Htet 40'	Report	Mohammadi 18'; Safi 70'

Thuwunna Stadium, Yangon
Attendance: 952
Referee: Mohamad Issa (Lebanon)
9 September 2025
19:00

Japan	6–1	Kuwait
Kawai 19', 40', 56'; Nwadike 32' (pen.); Yada 42'; Goto 90+2'	Report	Boodai 10'

Thuwunna Stadium, Yangon
Attendance: 85
Referee: Tuan Yaasin (Malaysia)

=== Group C ===
- All matches were held in Vietnam.
- Times listed are UTC+7.

Pos	Team	Pld	W	D	L	GF	GA	GD	Pts	Qualification
1	Vietnam (H)	3	3	0	0	4	0	+4	9	Final tournament
2	Yemen	3	2	0	1	3	2	+1	6	
3	Bangladesh	3	1	0	2	4	4	0	3	
4	Singapore	3	0	0	3	2	7	−5	0	

Source: AFC
Rules for classification: Qualification tiebreakers
(H) Hosts
3 September 2025
16:00

Yemen	2–1	Singapore
Ebrahim 20'; Masnom 45+2' (pen.)	Report	Louka Tan 80'

Việt Trì Stadium, Việt Trì
Attendance: 322
Referee: Yahya Al-Balushi (Oman)
3 September 2025
19:00

Vietnam	2–0	Bangladesh
Nguyễn Ngọc Mỹ 15'; Viktor Le 83'	Report

Việt Trì Stadium, Việt Trì
Attendance: 3,019
Referee: Resul Mämmedow (Turkmenistan)

6 September 2025
16:00

Bangladesh	0–1	Yemen
	Report	Al-Awami 90+4'

Việt Trì Stadium, Việt Trì
Attendance: 365
Referee: Amir Arab Baraghi (Iran)
6 September 2025
19:00

Singapore	0–1	Vietnam
	Report	Lê Văn Thuận 79'

Việt Trì Stadium, Việt Trì
Attendance: 6,046
Referee: Choi Hyun-jai (South Korea)

9 September 2025
16:00

Singapore	1–4	Bangladesh
Khairin 90+1'	Report	Fahamedul 70'; Al-Amin 73'; Mohsin 80'; Morsalin 83'

Việt Trì Stadium, Việt Trì
Attendance: 459
Referee: Resul Mämmedow (Turkmenistan)
9 September 2025
19:00

Vietnam	1–0	Yemen
Nguyễn Thanh Nhàn 70'	Report

Việt Trì Stadium, Việt Trì
Attendance: 6,879
Referee: Thoriq Alkatiri (Indonesia)

=== Group D ===
- All matches were held in China.
- Times listed are UTC+8.

Pos	Team	Pld	W	D	L	GF	GA	GD	Pts	Qualification
1	Australia	3	2	1	0	20	0	+20	7	Final tournament
2	China (H)	3	2	1	0	12	1	+11	7	Final tournament
3	Timor-Leste	3	1	0	2	7	8	−1	3	
4	Northern Mariana Islands	3	0	0	3	0	30	−30	0	

Source: AFC
Rules for classification: Qualification tiebreakers
(H) Hosts
3 September 2025
15:30

Australia	14–0	Northern Mariana Islands
Blair 5', 20', 47', 49'; Reec 8', 12'; Alagich 17', 43'; Dukuly 35', 69'; Bozinovski 54'; Rawlins 60', 71'; Hammond 90+4'	Report

Xi'an Sports Training Center Pitch 1, Xi'an
Attendance: 89
Referee: Ahmed Khalil (Bahrain)
3 September 2025
19:35

China	2–1	Timor-Leste
Behram 41'; Wang Yudong 45'	Report	Freitas 52'

Xi'an International Football Center, Xi'an
Attendance: 23,802
Referee: Chae Sang-hyeop (South Korea)

6 September 2025
15:30

Timor-Leste	0–6	Australia
	Report	Paull 24', 90'; Blair 27' (pen.); Grimaldi 36'; Reec 68'; Hammond 90+3'

Xi'an Sports Training Center Pitch 1, Xi'an
Attendance: 120
Referee: Venkatesh Ramachandran (India)
6 September 2025
19:35

Northern Mariana Islands	0–10	China
	Report	Behram 45+4', 75', 84'; Li Xinxiang 46'; Zhu Pengyu 48', 87'; Wang Yudong 67' (pen.), 90+1'; Xiang Yuwang 70'; Kuai Jiwen 74'

Xi'an International Football Center, Xi'an
Attendance: 30,982
Referee: Wiwat Jumpao-on (Thailand)

9 September 2025
15:30

Timor-Leste	6–0	Northern Mariana Islands
Freitas 37'; Lemos 45+2', 83'; Ribeiro 81'; Da Silva 90+1'; Dos Santos 90+3'	Report

Xi'an Sports Training Center Pitch 1, Xi'an, Xi'an
Attendance: 69
Referee: Ahmed Khalil (Bahrain)
9 September 2025
19:35

Australia	0–0	China
	Report

Xi'an International Football Center, Xi'an
Attendance: 33,022
Referee: Asker Nadjafaliev (Uzbekistan)

=== Group E ===
- All matches were held in Kyrgyzstan.
- Times listed are UTC+6.

Pos	Team	Pld	W	D	L	GF	GA	GD	Pts	Qualification
1	Kyrgyzstan (H)	3	2	1	0	10	3	+7	7	Final tournament
2	Uzbekistan	3	2	1	0	8	3	+5	7	Final tournament
3	Palestine	3	1	0	2	7	4	+3	3	
4	Sri Lanka	3	0	0	3	0	15	−15	0	

Source: AFC
Rules for classification: Qualification tiebreakers
(H) Hosts
3 September 2025
16:00

Uzbekistan	4–0	Sri Lanka
Rakhmonaliev 38'; Turdimurodov 40', 53'; Bakhromov 70'	Report

Dolen Omurzakov Stadium, Bishkek
Attendance: 50
Referee: Du Jianxin (China)
3 September 2025
20:00

Palestine	1–2	Kyrgyzstan
Abu El Haija 90+3'	Report	Merk 81' (pen.), 90+5'

Dolen Omurzakov Stadium, Bishkek
Attendance: 7,113
Referee: Abdullah Al Shehri (Saudi Arabia)

6 September 2025
16:00

Sri Lanka	0–5	Palestine
	Report	Abu El Haija 5'; Al-Tamra 50'; Taha 72'; Abu Illan 85'; Hasoun 90+1'

Dolen Omurzakov Stadium, Bishkek
Attendance: 45
Referee: Ahmad Yacoub Ibrahim (Jordan)
6 September 2025
20:00

Kyrgyzstan	2–2	Uzbekistan
Almazbekov 1'; Sharshenbekov 56'	Report	Turdimurodov 11'; Askarov 42'

Dolen Omurzakov Stadium, Bishkek
Attendance: 9,547
Referee: Qasim Al-Hatmi (Oman)

9 September 2025
16:00

Uzbekistan	2–1	Palestine
Askarov 25'; Turdimurodov 85'	Report	Sandouqa 70'

Dolen Omurzakov Stadium, Bishkek
Attendance: 50
Referee: Ahmad Alaeddin (Lebanon)
9 September 2025
20:00

Kyrgyzstan	6–0	Sri Lanka
Murzakhmatov 14', 45+5'; Merk 46'; Brauzman 59'; Abduzhaparov 68'; Datsiev 75'	Report

Dolen Omurzakov Stadium, Bishkek
Attendance: 11,775
Referee: Du Jianxin (China)

=== Group F ===
- All matches were held in Pathum Thani, Thailand, at Thammasat Stadium, as there were problems with the pitch at the originally scheduled True BG Stadium.
- Times listed are UTC+7.

Pos	Team	Pld	W	D	L	GF	GA	GD	Pts	Qualification
1	Thailand (H)	3	2	1	0	10	3	+7	7	Final tournament
2	Lebanon	3	2	1	0	6	2	+4	7	Final tournament
3	Malaysia	3	1	0	2	8	3	+5	3	
4	Mongolia	3	0	0	3	0	16	−16	0	

Source: AFC
Rules for classification: Qualification tiebreakers
(H) Hosts
3 September 2025
16:00

Malaysia	0–1	Lebanon
	Report	El Fadl 84'

Thammasat Stadium, Pathum Thani
Attendance: 40
Referee: Kim Woo-sung (South Korea)
3 September 2025
19:30

Thailand	6–0	Mongolia
Iklas 2'; Seksan 18', 39', 57'; Chawanwit 69'; Yotsakorn 82'	Report

Thammasat Stadium, Pathum Thani
Attendance: 1,013
Referee: Mohammed Kanah (Syria)

6 September 2025
16:00

Mongolia	0–7	Malaysia
	Report	Aliff 12', 63'; Aysar 14'; Tierney 38', 48', 49'; Ziad 69'

Thammasat Stadium, Pathum Thani
Attendance: 126
Referee: Sultan Mohamed Al-Hammadi (United Arab Emirates)
6 September 2025
19:30

Lebanon	2–2	Thailand
Farhat 47', 85'	Report	Seksan 72'; Chanapach 88'

Thammasat Stadium, Pathum Thani
Attendance: 1,366
Referee: Abdulhadi Al-Ruaile (Qatar)

9 September 2025
16:00

Lebanon	3–0	Mongolia
Istambouli 8', 45+1'; El Fadl 10'	Report

Thammasat Stadium, Pathum Thani
Attendance: 75
Referee: Daniel Elder (Australia)
9 September 2025
21:00 (Note: The match, originally scheduled for 19:30, was delayed until 21:00 due to heavy rain.)

Thailand	2–1	Malaysia
Kakana 34', 90+2'	Report	Aysar 40'

Thammasat Stadium, Pathum Thani
Attendance: 1,494
Referee: Kim Woo-sung (South Korea)

=== Group G ===
- All matches were held in Cambodia.
- Times listed are UTC+7.

Pos	Team	Pld	W	D	L	GF	GA	GD	Pts	Qualification
1	Iraq	3	2	1	0	9	1	+8	7	Final tournament
2	Cambodia (H)	3	1	2	0	1	0	+1	5	
3	Oman	3	1	1	1	1	1	0	4	
4	Pakistan	3	0	0	3	1	10	−9	0	

Source: AFC
Rules for classification: Qualification tiebreakers
(H) Hosts
3 September 2025
16:00

Iraq	8–1	Pakistan
Faisal 32' (pen.); Jasim 47', 66', 72'; Aayed 78', 90+4'; Younis 83'; Sadeq 85'	Report	Abdullah 61' (pen.)

Olympic Stadium, Phnom Penh
Attendance: 325
Referee: Hanna Hattab (Syria)
3 September 2025
19:00

Cambodia	0–0	Oman
	Report

Olympic Stadium, Phnom Penh
Attendance: 1,578
Referee: Mohammed Al-Shammari (Qatar)

6 September 2025
16:00

Oman	0–1	Iraq
	Report	Qabeel 62'

Olympic Stadium, Phnom Penh
Attendance: 349
Referee: Hiroki Kasahara (Japan)
6 September 2025
19:00

Pakistan	0–1	Cambodia
	Report	Yem Davit 31'

Olympic Stadium, Phnom Penh
Attendance: 3,059
Referee: Dong Fangyu (China)

9 September 2025
16:00

Oman	1–0	Pakistan
Bait Rabie 16'	Report

Olympic Stadium, Phnom Penh
Attendance: 356
Referee: Meder Tayçiev (Kyrgyzstan)
9 September 2025
19:00

Iraq	0–0	Cambodia
	Report

Olympic Stadium, Phnom Penh
Attendance: 4,115
Referee: Mohammed Al-Shammari (Qatar)

=== Group H ===
- All matches were held in Qatar.
- Times listed are UTC+3.

Pos	Team	Pld	W	D	L	GF	GA	GD	Pts	Qualification
1	Qatar (H)	3	3	0	0	17	2	+15	9	Final tournament
2	India	3	2	0	1	9	2	+7	6	
3	Bahrain	3	1	0	2	11	4	+7	3	
4	Brunei	3	0	0	3	0	29	−29	0	

Source: AFC
Rules for classification: Qualification tiebreakers
(H) Hosts
3 September 2025
18:15

Bahrain	0–2	India
	Report	Suhail 32'; Shivaldo 90+5'

Suheim bin Hamad Stadium, Doha
Attendance: 112
Referee: Oh Hyeon-jeong (South Korea)
3 September 2025
20:00

Qatar	13–0	Brunei
El Sayed 4', 23', 54', 58'; Al-Sharshani 6'; Shanan 11' (pen.); Surag 13'; Al-Hussein 20'; Muhammed 35'; Tamer 56', 90+5'; Brimil 70', 83'	Report

Abdullah bin Khalifa Stadium, Doha
Attendance: 204
Referee: Faisal Al-Balawi (Saudi Arabia)

6 September 2025
18:15

Brunei	0–10	Bahrain
	Report	Khalaidat 2', 22'; Ebrahim 20'; Al-Khayyat 21'; Bin Ahmed 26', 48'; Al-Moosawi 61'; Al-Khalaf 72'; Al-Subaei 87', 90+6'

Suheim bin Hamad Stadium, Doha
Attendance: 50
Referee: Mohammad Ghabayen (Jordan)
6 September 2025
20:00

India	1–2	Qatar
Suhail 52'	Report	Al-Hussein 18'; Al-Sharshani 67' (pen.)

Abdullah bin Khalifa Stadium, Doha
Attendance: 1,143
Referee: Adam Kersey (Australia)

9 September 2025
18:15

India	6–0	Brunei
Vibin 5', 8', 62'; Chhetri 42'; Aimen 87', 90+7'	Report

Suheim bin Hamad Stadium, Doha
Attendance: 312
Referee: Faisal Al-Balawi (Saudi Arabia)
9 September 2025
20:00

Qatar	2–1	Bahrain
Al-Hussein 90+1'; Al-Sharshani 90+9' (pen.)	Report	Al-Khayyat 71'

Abdullah bin Khalifa Stadium, Doha
Attendance: 500
Referee: Fu Ming (China)

=== Group I ===
- All matches were held in United Arab Emirates.
- Times listed are UTC+4.

Pos	Team	Pld	W	D	L	GF	GA	GD	Pts	Qualification
1	Iran	3	3	0	0	13	2	+11	9	Final tournament
2	United Arab Emirates (H)	3	2	0	1	17	3	+14	6	Final tournament
3	Hong Kong	3	1	0	2	1	6	−5	3	
4	Guam	3	0	0	3	0	20	−20	0	

Source: AFC
Rules for classification: Qualification tiebreakers
(H) Hosts
3 September 2025
17:30

Iran	4–0	Hong Kong
Jafari 70'; Razzaghinia 73'; Taheri 87', 90+2'	Report

Al Nahyan Stadium, Abu Dhabi
Attendance: 145
Referee: Kim Yu-jeong (South Korea)
3 September 2025
21:30

United Arab Emirates	13–0	Guam
Ndiaye 5'; Al-Marzooqi 16'; Saeed 17', 43', 76'; Sosu 30'; Al-Menhali 34', 45+3'; Yadoo 37'; Juma 44', 49'; Fahad 62'; Al-Harasi 88'	Report

Al Nahyan Stadium, Abu Dhabi
Attendance: 271
Referee: Muath Owfi (Palestine)

6 September 2025
17:30

Guam	0–6	Iran
	Report	Safari 42'; Taheri 47', 73', 78'; Saharkhizan 84'; Hosseinnejad 90'

Al Nahyan Stadium, Abu Dhabi
Attendance: 70
Referee: Sashanka Madushanka (Sri Lanka)
6 September 2025
21:30

Hong Kong	0–2	United Arab Emirates
	Report	Ndiaye 58'; Al-Memari 81'

Al Nahyan Stadium, Abu Dhabi
Attendance: 254
Referee: Hussein Abo Yehia (Lebanon)

9 September 2025
17:30

Hong Kong	1–0	Guam
Lee Lok Him 3'	Report

Al Nahyan Stadium, Abu Dhabi
Attendance: 40
Referee: Kim Yu-jeong (South Korea)
9 September 2025
21:30

United Arab Emirates	2–3	Iran
Al-Kass 45+4'; Al-Mansoori 72'	Report	Razzaghinia 25'; Saharkhizan 36', 42' (pen.)

Al Nahyan Stadium, Abu Dhabi
Attendance: 467
Referee: Zaid Thamer Mohammed (Iraq)

=== Group J ===
- All matches were held in Indonesia.
- Times listed are UTC+7.

Pos	Team	Pld	W	D	L	GF	GA	GD	Pts	Qualification
1	South Korea	3	3	0	0	13	0	+13	9	Final tournament
2	Indonesia (H)	3	1	1	1	5	1	+4	4	
3	Laos	3	1	1	1	3	8	−5	4	
4	Macau	3	0	0	3	1	13	−12	0	

Source: AFC
Rules for classification: Qualification tiebreakers
(H) Hosts
3 September 2025
15:30

South Korea	5–0	Macau
Jeong Jae-sang 14', 49' (pen.); Park Seung-ho 45+4'; Kang Seong-jin 58'; Seo Jae-min 88'	Report

Gelora Delta Stadium, Sidoarjo
Attendance: 106
Referee: Lê Thị Ly (Vietnam)
3 September 2025
19:30

Indonesia	0–0	Laos
	Report

Gelora Delta Stadium, Sidoarjo
Attendance: 5,238
Referee: Mohamed Jafran (Sri Lanka)

6 September 2025
15:30

Laos	0–7	South Korea
	Report	Jeong Ji-hoon 44'; Lee Kyung-dong 45+4'; Cho Sang-hyeok 49', 60', 90+2'; Park Seung-ho 69' (pen.); Hwang Do-yun 70'

Gelora Delta Stadium, Sidoarjo
Attendance: 249
Referee: Rustam Lutfullin (Uzbekistan)
6 September 2025
19:30

Macau	0–5	Indonesia
	Report	Leong Lek Han 3' (o.g.); Arkhan 18'; Rayhan 47'; Zanadin 68'; Struick 75'

Gelora Delta Stadium, Sidoarjo
Attendance: 6,364
Referee: Sivakorn Pu-Udom (Thailand)

9 September 2025
15:30

Laos	3–1	Macau
Peter 65' (pen.); Khampane 68'; Huang Cho Fong 81' (o.g.)	Report	Lei Man Tek 90' (pen.)

Gelora Delta Stadium, Sidoarjo
Attendance: 168
Referee: Lê Thị Ly (Vietnam)
9 September 2025
19:30

South Korea	1–0	Indonesia
Hwang Do-yun 6'	Report

Gelora Delta Stadium, Sidoarjo
Attendance: 7,126
Referee: Jin Jingyuan (China)

=== Group K ===
- All matches were held in Tajikistan.
- Times listed are UTC+5.

Pos	Team	Pld	W	D	L	GF	GA	GD	Pts	Qualification
1	Syria	3	3	0	0	7	3	+4	9	Final tournament
2	Philippines	3	2	0	1	6	2	+4	6	
3	Tajikistan (H)	3	1	0	2	4	2	+2	3	
4	Nepal	3	0	0	3	2	12	−10	0	

Source: AFC
Rules for classification: Qualification tiebreakers
(H) Hosts
3 September 2025
18:00

Syria	2–1	Philippines
Al-Aswad 61'; Al-Mustafa 80'	Report	Reyes 78'

Republican Central Stadium, Dushanbe
Attendance: 44
Referee: Saeed Rashid Al-Marzooqi (United Arab Emirates)
3 September 2025
21:00

Tajikistan	4–0	Nepal
Azizboev 39', 58'; Rahmatzoda 89'; Sharipov 90+1'	Report

Republican Central Stadium, Dushanbe
Attendance: 4,822
Referee: Ahmad A'Qashah (Singapore)

6 September 2025
18:00

Nepal	2–4	Syria
Dhami 56'; Shrestha 66'	Report	Al-Mustafa 26'; Al-Rina 73'; Al-Aswad 81'; Nayef 90'

Republican Central Stadium, Dushanbe
Attendance: 200
Referee: Akobirkhuja Shukurullaev (Uzbekistan)
6 September 2025
21:00

Philippines	1–0	Tajikistan
Leddel 71'	Report

Republican Central Stadium, Dushanbe
Attendance: 5,340
Referee: Harish Kundu (India)

9 September 2025
18:00

Philippines	4–0	Nepal
Banatao 33'; Mariona 39' (pen.); Cariño 81'; Reyes 85'	Report

Republican Central Stadium, Dushanbe
Attendance: 50
Referee: Ahmad A'Qashah (Singapore)
9 September 2025
21:00

Tajikistan	0–1	Syria
	Report	Al-Sarakbi 90+8'

Republican Central Stadium, Dushanbe
Attendance: 6,750
Referee: Koki Nagamine (Japan)

== Ranking of second-placed teams ==
The four best-ranked runners-up also qualified for the final tournament.

Pos	Grp	Team	Pld	W	D	L	GF	GA	GD	Pts	Qualification
1	D	China	3	2	1	0	12	1	+11	7	Final tournament
2	E	Uzbekistan	3	2	1	0	8	3	+5	7	Final tournament
3	F	Lebanon	3	2	1	0	6	2	+4	7	Final tournament
4	I	United Arab Emirates	3	2	0	1	17	3	+14	6	Final tournament
5	H	India	3	2	0	1	9	2	+7	6	
6	A	Turkmenistan	3	2	0	1	8	3	+5	6	
7	K	Philippines	3	2	0	1	6	2	+4	6	
8	C	Yemen	3	2	0	1	3	2	+1	6	
9	G	Cambodia	3	1	2	0	1	0	+1	5	
10	J	Indonesia	3	1	1	1	5	1	+4	4	
11	B	Kuwait	3	1	1	1	2	6	−4	4	

Source: AFC
Rules for classification: 1) points; 2) goal difference; 3) goals scored; 4) disciplinary points; 5) drawing of lots.

== Goalscorers ==
There were 271 goals scored in 66 matches, for an average of 4.11 goals per match.

5 goals

- (Australia) Nathanael Blair
- (Iran) Kasra Taheri
- (Jordan) Odeh Al-Fakhouri

4 goals

- (China) Behram Abduweli
- (Qatar) Mostafa El Sayed
- (Thailand) Seksan Ratree
- (Turkmenistan) Daýanç Meredow
- (United Arab Emirates) Saeed Maqdami
- (Uzbekistan) Rustam Turdimurodov

3 goals

- (Australia) Jing Reec
- (China) Wang Yudong
- (India) Vibin Mohanan
- (Iran) Saeid Saharkhizan
- (Iraq) Ali Jasim
- (Japan) Tokumo Kawai
- (Jordan) Ibrahim Sabra
- (Jordan) Moamen Al-Saket
- (Kyrgyzstan) Kimi Merk
- (Malaysia) Fergus Tierney
- (Qatar) Hashmi Al-Hussein
- (Qatar) Jassem Al-Sharshani
- (South Korea) Cho Sang-hyeok
- (United Arab Emirates) Mohammed Al-Mansoori

2 goals

- (Australia) Ethan Alagich
- (Australia) Yaya Dukuly
- (Australia) Aydan Hammond
- (Australia) Nathan Paull
- (Australia) Joshua Rawlins
- (Bahrain) Mubarak Bin Ahmed
- (Bahrain) Abdulrahman Al-Khayyat
- (Bahrain) Abdullah Al-Subaei
- (China) Zhu Pengyu
- (Timor-Leste) Gali Freitas
- (Timor-Leste) Alexandro Lemos
- (India) Mohammed Aimen
- (India) Muhammad Suhail
- (Iran) Amirmohammad Razzaghinia
- (Iraq) Ahmed Aayed
- (Japan) Gaku Nawata
- (Japan) Keisuke Gotō
- (Jordan) Mohammad Abu Hazeem
- (Jordan) Ali Al-Azaizeh
- (Kyrgyzstan) Marlen Murzakhmatov
- (Lebanon) Ali El Fadl
- (Lebanon) Hasan Farhat
- (Lebanon) Danny Istambouli
- (Malaysia) Aysar Hadi
- (Malaysia) Aliff Izwan
- (Myanmar) Swan Htet
- (Palestine) Khalid Abu El Haija
- (Philippines) Sandro Reyes
- (Qatar) Marawan Brimil
- (Qatar) Noureldan Tamer
- (South Korea) Hwang Do-yoon
- (South Korea) Jeong Jae-sang
- (South Korea) Park Seung-ho
- (Syria) Mahmoud Al-Aswad
- (Syria) Mohammad Al-Mustafa
- (Tajikistan) Muhammadali Azizboev
- (Thailand) Kakana Khamyok
- (Turkmenistan) Söhbet Durdyýew
- (United Arab Emirates) Junior Ndiaye
- (Uzbekistan) Bekhruz Askarov

1 goal

- (Afghanistan) Maroof Mohammadi
- (Afghanistan) Yaser Safi
- (Australia) Rhys Bozinovski
- (Australia) Matthew Grimaldi
- (Bahrain) Saood Ebrahim
- (Bahrain) Abdullah Hesham Ghanem
- (Bahrain) Khaled Al-Khalaf
- (Bahrain) Hesham Khalaidat
- (Bahrain) Sayed Al-Moosawi
- (Bangladesh) Mohsin Ahmed
- (Bangladesh) Mohammed Al-Amin
- (Bangladesh) Fahamedul Islam
- (Bangladesh) Shekh Morsalin
- (Bhutan) Jetsuen Dorji
- (Bhutan) Sonam Dorji
- (Bhutan) Kinzang Tenzin
- (Cambodia) Yem Davit
- (China) Kuai Jiwen
- (China) Li Xinxiang
- (China) Xiang Yuwang
- (Chinese Taipei) Lin Chen
- (Chinese Taipei) Wei Chih-chuan
- (Timor-Leste) Luis Figo Ribeiro
- (Timor-Leste) Fretelian dos Santos
- (Timor-Leste) Oatnasio da Silva
- (Hong Kong) Lee Lok Him
- (India) Ayush Chhetri
- (India) Shivaldo Singh
- (Indonesia) Zanadin Fariz
- (Indonesia) Arkhan Fikri
- (Indonesia) Rayhan Hannan
- (Indonesia) Rafael Struick
- (Iran) Mohammadjavad Hosseinnejad
- (Iran) Farhan Jafari
- (Iran) Alireza Safari
- (Iraq) Amoori Faisal
- (Iraq) Mustafa Qabeel
- (Iraq) Ali Sadeq
- (Iraq) Dhulfiqar Younis
- (Japan) Uche Nwadike
- (Japan) Tariqkani Okabe
- (Japan) Shion Shinkawa
- (Japan) Ryunosuke Yada
- (Jordan) Abdallah Al-Mnayyes
- (Jordan) Ayham Al-Samamreh
- (Jordan) Amin Al-Shanaineh
- (Kuwait) Ahmad Boodai
- (Kuwait) Moath Al-Enezi
- (Kyrgyzstan) Erbol Abduzhaparov
- (Kyrgyzstan) Beknaz Almazbekov
- (Kyrgyzstan) Khristiyan Brauzman
- (Kyrgyzstan) Said Datsiev
- (Kyrgyzstan) Arsen Sharshenbekov
- (Laos) Khampane Douangvilay
- (Laos) Peter Phanthavong
- (Macau) Lei Man Tek
- (Malaysia) Ziad El Basheer
- (Nepal) Nirajan Dhami
- (Nepal) Sumit Shrestha
- (Oman) Turki Bait Rabie
- (Pakistan) McKeal Abdullah
- (Palestine) Ibrahim Abu Illan
- (Palestine) Oday Hasoun
- (Palestine) Mohammed Sandouqa
- (Palestine) Qais Taha
- (Palestine) Ali Al-Tamra
- (Philippines) Otu Banatao
- (Philippines) Dov Cariño
- (Philippines) Noah Leddel
- (Philippines) Javier Mariona
- (Qatar) Abdulaziz Muhammed
- (Qatar) Mobark Shanan
- (Qatar) Mohamed Surag
- (Singapore) Khairin Nadim
- (Singapore) Louka Tan
- (South Korea) Jeong Ji-hoon
- (South Korea) Kang Seong-jin
- (South Korea) Lee Kyung-dong
- (South Korea) Seo Jae-min
- (Syria) Ali Al-Rina
- (Syria) Mahmoud Nayef
- (Syria) Mohamad Al-Sarakbi
- (Tajikistan) Rahmatshoh Rahmatzoda
- (Tajikistan) Daler Sharipov
- (Thailand) Chanapach Buaphan
- (Thailand) Yotsakorn Burapha
- (Thailand) Chawanwit Saelao
- (Thailand) Iklas Sanron
- (Turkmenistan) Abdyrahman Annamyradow
- (Turkmenistan) Magtymberdi Berenow
- (United Arab Emirates) Eisa Al-Harasi
- (United Arab Emirates) Mayed Al-Kass
- (United Arab Emirates) Dhari Al-Maazmi
- (United Arab Emirates) Yousif Al-Marzooqi
- (United Arab Emirates) Ali Al-Memari
- (United Arab Emirates) Mansoor Al-Menhali
- (United Arab Emirates) Solomon Sosu
- (United Arab Emirates) Ahmed Yadoo
- (Uzbekistan) Sardorbek Bakhromov
- (Uzbekistan) Umarali Rakhmonaliev
- (Vietnam) Lê Văn Thuận
- (Vietnam) Viktor Le
- (Vietnam) Nguyễn Ngọc Mỹ
- (Vietnam) Nguyễn Thanh Nhàn
- (Yemen) Abdo Al-Awami
- (Yemen) Radhi Ebrahim
- (Yemen) Abdulaziz Masnom

1 own goal

- (Chinese Taipei) Huang Chun-lin (against Jordan)
- (Macau) Huang Cho Fong (against Laos)
- (Macau) Leong Lek Han (against Indonesia)

== Qualified teams ==
The following teams qualified for the 2026 AFC U-23 Asian Cup.

Team	Qualification method	Date of qualification	Appearance(s)			Previous best performance
Team	Qualification method	Date of qualification	Total	First	Last	Previous best performance
Saudi Arabia	Hosts	1 July 2023	7th	2013	2024	Champions (2022)
Jordan	Group A winners	9 September 2025	7th	2013	2024	Third place (2013)
Japan	Group B winners	9 September 2025	7th	2013	2024	Champions (2016, 2024)
Vietnam	Group C winners	9 September 2025	6th	2016	2024	Runners-up (2018)
Australia	Group D winners	9 September 2025	7th	2013	2024	Third place (2020)
Kyrgyzstan	Group E winners	9 September 2025	1st	None		Debut
Thailand	Group F winners	9 September 2025	6th	2016	2024	Quarter-finals (2020)
Iraq	Group G winners	9 September 2025	7th	2013	2024	Champions (2013)
Qatar	Group H winners	9 September 2025	6th	2016	2024	Third place (2018)
Iran	Group I winners	9 September 2025	5th	2013	2022	Quarter-finals (2016)
South Korea	Group J winners	9 September 2025	7th	2013	2024	Champions (2020)
Syria	Group K winners	9 September 2025	5th	2013	2020	Quarter-finals (2013, 2020)
China	Best runners-up	9 September 2025	6th	2013	2024	Group stage (2013, 2016, 2018, 2020, 2024)
Uzbekistan	Second-best runners-up	9 September 2025	7th	2013	2024	Champions (2018)
Lebanon	Third-best runners-up	9 September 2025	1st	None		Debut
United Arab Emirates	Fourth-best runners-up	9 September 2025	6th	2013	2024	Quarter-finals (2013, 2016, 2020)

== See also ==
- 2027 AFC Asian Cup qualification
- 2026 AFC U-17 Asian Cup qualification
- 2026 AFC Women's Asian Cup qualification
- 2026 AFC U-17 Women's Asian Cup qualification
- 2026 AFC U-20 Women's Asian Cup qualification
