= Mustafa Qabeel =

Iraqi footballer (born 2005)

Personal information
- Date of birth: 8 January 2005 (age 21)
- Place of birth: Erbil, Iraq
- Height: 1.82 m (6 ft 0 in)
- Position: Forward

Team information
- Current team: Erbil
- Number: 7

Youth career
- –2024: Erbil

Senior career*
Years	Team	Apps	(Gls)
2024-	Erbil	42	(11)

International career^{‡}
2023-	Iraq U20	11	(1)
2024-	Iraq U23	6	(1)
- * Club domestic league appearances and goals as of 5 April 2026 ‡ National team caps and goals as of 5 April 2026

Mustafa Qabeel (Arabic: مصطفى قابيل; born 8 January 2005) is an Iraqi professional footballer who plays as a forward for Iraq Stars League club Erbil and the Iraq U-23 national team.

== Club career ==
=== Erbil SC ===
Qabeel came up through the youth academy of Erbil and broke into the first team during the 2024-25 Iraq Stars League, scoring 6 goals in his debut season.

Mustafa had a very strong start in the 2025-26 Iraq Stars League, scoring three goals in his first two appearances and jumping to the top of the golden boot race while helping his club lead the Iraqi top flight.

Leading up to the 2026 winter transfer window, Qabeel was attracting interest from clubs in Saudi Arabia, Russia and Egypt, including Al-Ettifaq and Al-Ahly.

Egyptian giants Al-Ahly showed the strongest interest in Mustafa, travelling to Iraq to meet with Erbil's president and Mustafa's father to secure his transfer, with his contract at the Iraqi club, running until 2027, containing a release clause. Erbil would reject all offers for the winter transfer window, seeing Qabeel as a key part of the squad fighting for a first league title since 2012 during the second half of the season, having already registered 9 goal involvements in 12 matches.

== International career ==
=== Iraq U-20 ===
Qabeel represented Iraq at the AFC U-20 Asian Cup twice, in 2023 and in 2025, helping Iraq reach the final and quarter-final, respectively.

=== Iraq U-23 ===
Mustafa received his first call up to the Iraq U-23 national team in 2024 ahead of the U-23 West Asian Championship and made his debut against Australia.

In 2025, he was called up again for the U-23 Asian Cup qualifiers in Cambodia, where he got an assist in an 8–1 win over Pakistan and a goal in a 1–0 victory over Oman.

== Style of Play ==
Qabeel is a versatile player, capable of performing in multiple positions across the front line, as well as the “number 10” role in attacking midfield, due to his ability to link the midfield and attack and create chances.

== Career Statistics ==
=== Club ===
As of match played 5 April 2026

Appearances and goals by club, season and competition
Club	Season	League			National cup (Note: Includes Iraq FA Cup)		Continental		Total	
Club	Season	Division	Apps	Goals	Apps	Goals	Apps	Goals	Apps	Goals
Erbil	2024–25	Iraq Stars League	28	6	0	0	-	-	28	6
Duhok	2025–26	Iraq Stars League	14	5	0	0	-	-	14	5
Career total			42	11	0	0	0	0	42	11

== Honours ==
Iraq U20

- AFC U-20 Asian Cup second place: 2023
