= Fahamedul Islam =

Bangladeshi footballer (born 2006)

Personal information
- Date of birth: 30 June 2006 (age 20)
- Place of birth: Feni, Bangladesh
- Height: 1.70 m (5 ft 7 in)
- Positions: Left-back; left winger

Team information
- Current team: Sestri Levante

Youth career
- 2020–2022: Spezia
- 2022–2024: Sampdoria

Senior career*
| Years | Team | Apps | (Gls) |
| 2024 | Ligorna | 6 | (0) |
| 2024–2025 | Livorno | 2 | (0) |
| 2025–2026 | Olbia | 28 | (1) |
| 2026– | Sestri Levante | 2 | (0) |

International career^{‡}
| 2025– | Bangladesh U23 | 2 | (1) |
| 2025– | Bangladesh | 9 | (0) |
- * Club domestic league appearances and goals as of 18 October 2026 ‡ National team caps and goals as of 1 October 2026

Fahamedul Islam (Bengali: ফাহমিদুল ইসলাম; born 30 June 2006) is a Bangladeshi professional footballer who plays as a left-back or left winger for Italian Serie D club Sestri Levante and the Bangladesh national team.

== Club career ==
Islam was born in Feni, Bangladesh, and moved to Italy at a young age. He developed through the youth academies of Spezia and later Sampdoria, where he played for the under-18 team, making 25 appearances and scoring four goals in the 2023–24 season.

In 2024, he transitioned to senior football, joining Serie D club Ligorna, where he made six appearances. Later that year, he moved to Livorno, playing two matches before signing with Olbia on 5 February 2025. He made an immediate impact by scoring a hat-trick for the club's under-19 team, and almost scoring an equaliser in his first-team debut against Paganese a few days later.

He joined Sestri Levante in October 2026.

== International career ==
In 2025, Fahamedul was called up to the preliminary squad of the Bangladesh national team for the 2027 AFC Asian Cup qualifying game against India. He arrived in Taif, Saudi Arabia for training on 11 March 2025, and started training with the squad the following day. However, he failed to make the final 24 squad and returned to Italy. on May 27th 2025, Fahamedul was called again to the preliminary squad of Bangladesh against Bhutan and Singapore.

Islam made his first appearance and start for Bangladesh on 4 June 2025 against Bhutan for 60 minutes.

== Career statistics ==
As of match played 10 May 2026

=== Club ===
Appearances and goals by club, season and competition
| Club | Season | League | | |
| Club | Season | Division | Apps | Goals |
|---|---|---|---|---|
| Ligorna | 2024 | Serie D | 6 | 0 |
| Livorno | 2024–25 | Serie D | 2 | 0 |
| Olbia | 2024–25 | Serie D | 6 | 0 |
| Olbia | 2025–26 | Serie D | 22 | 1 |
| Career total | | | 36 | 1 |

=== International ===
Appearances and goals by national team and year
| National team | Year | Apps | Goals |
|---|---|---|---|
| Bangladesh | 2025 | 4 | 0 |
| Bangladesh | 2026 | 3 | 0 |
| Total | | 7 | 0 |

=== International goals ===
==== Youth ====
Scores and results list Bangladesh's goal tally first.

| No. | Date | Venue | Opponent | Score | Result | Competition |
|---|---|---|---|---|---|---|
| 1. | 9 September 2025 | Việt Trì Stadium, Phú Thọ, Vietnam | Singapore | 1–0 | 4–1 | AFC U-23 Asian Cup qualification |
