= Samed Baždar =

Bosnian footballer (born 2004)

Personal information
- Date of birth: 31 January 2004 (age 22)
- Place of birth: Novi Pazar, Serbia and Montenegro
- Height: 1.86 m (6 ft 1 in)
- Position: Forward

Team information
- Current team: Sint-Truiden
- Number: 9

Youth career
- Partizan

Senior career*
| Years | Team | Apps | (Gls) |
| 2021–2024 | Partizan | 58 | (11) |
| 2024–2026 | Zaragoza | 39 | (5) |
| 2026 | → Jagiellonia (loan) | 15 | (3) |
| 2026– | Sint-Truiden | 10 | (5) |

International career^{‡}
| 2019 | Serbia U15 | 1 | (0) |
| 2019 | Serbia U16 | 2 | (0) |
| 2020 | Serbia U17 | 2 | (1) |
| 2021–2022 | Serbia U19 | 14 | (2) |
| 2023–2024 | Serbia U21 | 4 | (1) |
| 2024 | Serbia | 1 | (0) |
| 2024– | Bosnia and Herzegovina | 16 | (1) |
- * Club domestic league appearances and goals as of 21 November 2026 ‡ National team caps and goals as of 17 November 2026

Samed Baždar (pronounced [sǎmed bǎʒdar]; born 31 January 2004) is a professional footballer who plays as a forward for Belgian Pro League club Sint-Truiden. Born in Serbia, he plays for the Bosnia and Herzegovina national team.

Baždar started his professional career at Partizan, before joining Zaragoza in 2024, who loaned him to Jagiellonia in 2026. Later that year, he signed with Sint-Truiden.

A former Serbian youth international, Baždar also made his senior international debut for Serbia, before switching his allegiance to Bosnia and Herzegovina in 2024, earning 16 caps since. He represented the nation at the 2026 FIFA World Cup.

== Club career ==
=== Partizan ===
Baždar started playing football at local clubs, before joining Partizan's youth academy in 2018. In December 2020, he signed his first professional contract with the team. He made his professional debut against Voždovac on 15 May 2021 at the age of 17. On 9 July 2022, he scored his first professional goal in a triumph over Javor.

In August, he signed a new four-year deal with the squad.

=== Zaragoza ===
In July 2024, Baždar was transferred to Spanish side Zaragoza for an undisclosed transfer fee. He made his official debut for the club on 16 August against Cádiz. On 21 September, he scored his first goal for Real Zaragoza against Levante, which secured the victory for his team.

In January 2026, he was loaned to Polish outfit Jagiellonia until the end of the season.

=== Sint-Truiden ===
In August, Baždar moved to Belgian club Sint-Truiden on a five-year contract. He made his competitive debut for the squad in a UEFA Europa League qualifier against Omonia on 20 August. A week later, he made his league debut against Antwerp and managed to score a brace, which were his first goals for Sint-Truiden.

== International career ==
After representing the Serbia at all youth levels, Baždar made his senior international debut in a friendly game against Cyprus on 25 March 2024. However, in October, he decided that he would play for Bosnia and Herzegovina in the future.

In November, his request to change sports citizenship from Serbian to Bosnian was approved by FIFA. Earlier that month, he received his first senior call up, for 2024–25 UEFA Nations League A matches against Germany and the Netherlands. He debuted against the former on 16 November.

On 6 September 2025, in a 2026 FIFA World Cup qualifier against San Marino, he scored his first senior international goal.

In June 2026, Baždar was named in Bosnia and Herzegovina's squad for the 2026 FIFA World Cup. He made his tournament debut in the opening group game against Canada on 12 June.

== Personal life ==
Baždar is a practising Muslim; together with international teammates Sead Kolašinac, Amar Memić, Tarik Muharemović, Haris Tabaković, Nail Omerović, Salko Hamzić, Zinedin Smajlović, Nihad Mujakić and Ermin Mahmić he visited a mosque in Ilidža during the national team's concentration.

== Career statistics ==
=== Club ===
As of match played 21 November 2026

Appearances and goals by club, season and competition
| Club | Season | League | | | National cup (Note: Includes Serbian Cup, Copa del Rey, Belgian Cup) | | Continental | | Total | |
| Club | Season | Division | Apps | Goals | Apps | Goals | Apps | Goals | Apps | Goals |
|---|---|---|---|---|---|---|---|---|---|---|
| Partizan | 2020–21 | Serbian SuperLiga | 1 | 0 | 0 | 0 | – | | 1 | 0 |
| Partizan | 2021–22 | Serbian SuperLiga | 5 | 0 | 1 | 0 | 2 (Note: Appearances in UEFA Conference League) | 0 | 8 | 0 |
| Partizan | 2022–23 | Serbian SuperLiga | 27 | 4 | 0 | 0 | 7 (Note: Five appearances in UEFA Europa League; two appearances in UEFA Conference League) | 0 | 34 | 4 |
| Partizan | 2023–24 | Serbian SuperLiga | 25 | 7 | 4 | 1 | 2 | 0 | 31 | 8 |
| Partizan | Total | | 58 | 11 | 5 | 1 | 11 | 0 | 74 | 12 |
| Zaragoza | 2024–25 | Segunda División | 31 | 4 | 0 | 0 | – | | 31 | 4 |
| Zaragoza | 2025–26 | Segunda División | 8 | 1 | 1 | 0 | – | | 9 | 1 |
| Zaragoza | Total | | 39 | 5 | 1 | 0 | – | | 40 | 5 |
| Jagiellonia (loan) | 2025–26 | Ekstraklasa | 15 | 3 | – | | 2 | 0 | 17 | 3 |
| Sint-Truiden | 2026–27 | Belgian Pro League | 10 | 5 | 1 | 0 | 5 (Note: Two appearances in UEFA Europa League; three appearances in UEFA Conference League) | 0 | 16 | 5 |
| Career total | | | 122 | 24 | 7 | 1 | 18 | 0 | 147 | 25 |

=== International ===
As of match played 17 November 2026

Appearances and goals by national team and year
| National team | Year | Apps | Goals |
|---|---|---|---|
Serbia
| Serbia | 2024 | 1 | 0 |
| Serbia | Total | 1 | 0 |
Bosnia and Herzegovina
| Bosnia and Herzegovina | 2024 | 2 | 0 |
| Bosnia and Herzegovina | 2025 | 9 | 1 |
| Bosnia and Herzegovina | 2026 | 5 | 0 |
| Bosnia and Herzegovina | Total | 16 | 1 |
| Career total | | 17 | 1 |

Scores and results list Bosnia and Herzegovina's goal tally first, score column indicates score after each Baždar goal.

List of international goals scored by Samed Baždar
| No. | Date | Venue | Cap | Opponent | Score | Result | Competition |
|---|---|---|---|---|---|---|---|
| 1 | 6 September 2025 | San Marino Stadium, Serravalle, San Marino | 7 | San Marino | 4–0 | 6–0 | 2026 FIFA World Cup qualification |
