= Isaías Delpupo =

Argentine footballer (born 2003)

Personal information
- Full name: Isaías Delpupo
- Date of birth: 31 March 2003 (age 23)
- Place of birth: El Socorro, Argentina
- Height: 1.76 m (5 ft 9 in)
- Position: Midfielder

Team information
- Current team: Patro Eisden
- Number: 77

Youth career
- General Gelly
- Rivadavia de Peyrano
- Trafico de Pergamino
- Provincial de Pergamino
- CA El Socorro
- 2017–2023: Cagliari

Senior career*
Years	Team	Apps	(Gls)
2023–2024	Cagliari	1	(0)
2023–2024	→ Pontedera (loan)	33	(9)
2024–2026	Sint-Truiden	12	(0)
2026–	Patro Eisden	1	(0)
- * Club domestic league appearances and goals as of 15 August 2026

Isaías Delpupo (born 31 March 2003) is an Argentine professional footballer who plays as a midfielder for Belgian club Patro Eisden.

== Club career ==
Delpupo began playing football in his native Argentina with the youth academies of General Gelly, Rivadavia de Peyrano, Trafico de Pergamino, Provincial de Pergamino and CA El Socorro. He moved to Italy at the age of 13 and joined Cagliari, where he worked his way up their youth categories. On 15 June 2021, he extended his contract until June 2023. On 17 June 2022, he again extended his contract with the club until June 2025. He made his senior and professional debut with Cagliari as a late substitute in a 2–0 Serie B loss to Modena on 3 February 2023.

On 31 July 2023, Delpupo joined Pontedera on loan.

On 9 August 2024, Delpupo signed with Sint-Truiden in Belgium, but was sent-off six minutes into his debut as substitute against Union Saint-Gilloise in a 0–0 draw later that month, and was not picked for a matchday squad for the next two months.

== International career ==
Born in Argentina, Delpupo is of Italian descent and holds dual citizenship. On 1 June 2022, he was called up to represent the Italy U19s. A couple of weeks later, on 24 June 2022, he was called up to the Argentina U20s.

== Playing style ==
Delpupo is a left-footed, quick, technical and physical attacking midfielder. He excels in dribbling and can quickly play a pass, assisting in the transition from midfield to attack.

== Career statistics ==
As of match played 22 March 2026

Appearances and goals by club, season and competition
Club	Season	League			National cup (Note: Includes Coppa Italia and Belgian Cup)		Other		Total	
Club	Season	Division	Apps	Goals	Apps	Goals	Apps	Goals	Apps	Goals
Cagliari	2022–23	Serie B	1	0	0	0	0	0	1	0
Cagliari	2023–24	Serie A	0	0	0	0	—		0	0
Cagliari	Total		1	0	0	0	0	0	1	0
Pontedera (loan)	2023–24	Serie C	33	9	—		3 (Note: Two appearances in Coppa Italia Serie C; One appearance, one goal in Serie C Promotion play-offs)	1	36	10
Sint-Truiden	2024–25	Belgian Pro League	8	0	2	0	—		10	0
Sint-Truiden	2025–26	Belgian Pro League	4	0	2	0	—		6	0
Sint-Truiden	Total		12	0	4	0	—		16	0
Career total			46	9	4	0	3	1	53	10
