= Nelson Ishiwatari =

Japanese footballer (born 2005)

Nelson Ishiwatari 石渡 ネルソン
Personal information
- Full name: Ischivatar Nelson Jujichirow
- Date of birth: 10 May 2005 (age 21)
- Place of birth: Kyoto, Japan
- Height: 1.85 m (6 ft 1 in)
- Position: Midfielder

Team information
- Current team: Sint-Truiden
- Number: 18

Youth career
- 2012–2017: Nishikyogoku JSC
- 2018–2023: Cerezo Osaka

Senior career*
Years	Team	Apps	(Gls)
2022–2026	Cerezo Osaka	18	(0)
2024	→ Ehime (loan)	12	(1)
2025	→ Iwaki (loan)	29	(4)
2026–	Sint-Truiden	7	(1)

International career^{‡}
2023	Japan U18	1	(0)
2025	Japan U20	8	(0)
2025–	Japan U22	1	(0)
2026–	Japan U23	8	(0)
Medal record
Men's football
Representing Japan
AFC U-23 Asian Cup
Gold medal – first place	2026 Saudi Arabia
Asian Games
Silver medal – second place	2026 Aichi–Nagoya
- * Club domestic league appearances and goals as of 11 October 2026 ‡ National team caps and goals as of 3 October 2026

Nelson Yuichiro Ishiwatari (石渡 ネルソン, Ishiwatari Neruson; born 10 May 2005) is a Japanese professional footballer who plays as a midfielder for Belgian Pro League club Sint-Truiden.

== Club career ==
Ishiwatari made his J1 League debut for Cerezo Osaka in a 4–0 loss to FC Tokyo.

On 17 July 2026, Ishiwatari signed with Sint-Truiden in Belgium, joining six other Japanese players on the club's squad.

== International career ==
Ishiwatari represented Japan at the 2025 FIFA U-20 World Cup, where they reached the Round of 16, and at the 2026 AFC U-23 Asian Cup, which Japan won.

== Personal life ==
Ishiwatari was born in Kyoto to a Nigerian father and Japanese mother.

== Career statistics ==
=== Club ===
As of 11 October 2026.

Appearances and goals by club, season and competition
Club	Season	League			National cup (Note: Includes Emperors Cup, Belgian Cup)		League cup (Note: Includes J.League Cup)		Continental		Total	
Club	Season	Division	Apps	Goals	Apps	Goals	Apps	Goals	Apps	Goals	Apps	Goals
Cerezo Osaka	2022	J1 League	1	0	0	0	1	0	—		2	0
Cerezo Osaka	2023	J1 League	0	0	1	1	1	0	—		2	1
Cerezo Osaka	2026	J1 (100)	17	0	0	0	0	0	—		17	0
Cerezo Osaka	Total		18	0	1	1	2	0	—		21	1
Ehime FC (loan)	2024	J2 League	12	1	2	0	—		—		14	1
Iwaki FC (loan)	2025	J2 League	29	4	—		1	2	—		30	6
Sint-Truiden	2026–27	Belgian Pro League	7	1	0	0	—		3 (Note: Two appearances in UEFA Europa League, one appearance in UEFA Conference League)	0	10	1
Career total			66	6	3	1	3	2	3	0	75	9

== Honours ==
Japan U23

- AFC U-23 Asian Cup: 2026
