= Maksim Kireev =

Belarusian footballer

Personal information
- Full name: Maksim Igorevich Kireev
- Date of birth: 9 July 2004 (age 22)
- Place of birth: Brussels, Belgium
- Height: 1.82 m (6 ft 0 in)
- Position: Striker

Team information
- Current team: Mechelen
- Number: 10

Youth career
- 2013–2022: Anderlecht

Senior career*
Years	Team	Apps	(Gls)
2023–2025	Lierse	39	(6)
2025–	Mechelen	13	(0)

International career^{‡}
2019	Belgium U15	1	(0)
2022–2023	Belarus U19	4	(0)
2024–	Belarus	6	(0)
- * Club domestic league appearances and goals as of 31 May 2026 ‡ National team caps and goals as of 8 September 2024

Maksim Igorevich Kireev (Belarusian: Максім Ігаравіч Кірэеў; Russian: Максим Игоревич Киреев; born 9 July 2004) is a football player who plays as a striker for Belgian Pro League club Mechelen. Born in Belgium, he represents the Belarus national team.

== Club career ==
On 25 August 2025, Kireev signed with Mechelen for four seasons.

== International career ==
Kireev made his debut for the senior Belarus national team on 21 March 2024 in a friendly against Montenegro.
