= Mohammad Abu Hazeem =

Jordanian footballer (born 2003)

Mohammad Kahlan
Personal information
- Full name: Mohammad Kahlan Abdelrahman Abu Hazeem
- Date of birth: 2 April 2003 (age 23)
- Place of birth: Amman, Jordan
- Height: 1.69 m (5 ft 7 in)
- Position: Midfielder

Team information
- Current team: Al-Wehdat

Youth career
- –2023: Al-Wehdat

Senior career*
| Years | Team | Apps | (Gls) |
| 2023–2024 | Al-Wehdat | | |
| 2024–2025 | Al-Faisaly | | |
| 2025 | Al-Ramtha | 1 | (0) |
| 2025– | Al-Wehdat | 8 | (1) |

International career^{‡}
| 2021 | Jordan U18 | 3 | (0) |
| 2022–2023 | Jordan U20 | 10 | (2) |
| 2023– | Jordan U23 | 12 | (2) |
- * Club domestic league appearances and goals as of 8 May 2026 ‡ National team caps and goals as of 9 September 2025

Mohammad Kahlan Abdelrahman Abu Hazeem (Arabic: محمد كحلان عبد الرحمن أبو هزيم; born 2 April 2003), also known as Mohammad Kahlan (Arabic: محمد كحلان), is a Jordanian professional footballer who plays as a midfielder for Jordanian Pro League club Al-Wehdat.

== Club career ==
=== Early career ===
Abu Hazeem began his career at Al-Wehdat, going through all the youth ranks at the club.

=== Al-Wehdat ===
Kahlan made his debut during the 2023–24 Jordanian Pro League season under Omani manager Rashid Jaber. Due to the continuous technical staff changes at Al-Wehdat during the season, Kahlan did not have the opportunity to prove himself and convince the coaches of his potential. As a result, he would find himself excluded by the club.

=== Al-Faisaly ===
On 5 March 2024, Kahlan joined Al-Faisaly from Al-Wehdat on a season and a half contract.

=== Al-Ramtha ===
On 25 June 2025, Al-Ramtha announced that they signed Mohammad Abu Hazeem for the 2024–25 Jordanian Pro League season. He would make one appearance for the club, before terminating his contract by mutual consent.

=== Al-Wehdat ===
On 5 August 2025, Abu Hazeem returned to Al-Wehdat signing on a two-year contract, after terminating with Al-Ramtha.

== International career ==
Kahlan was first called up to the Jordan U-23 in November 2023 for a training camp in Saudi Arabia. He would go on to get called up by the team for the 2024 WAFF U-23 Championship. He was also called up to the final roster for the 2024 AFC U-23 Asian Cup, but had to return to his club due to a minor heart problem which required treatment.

On 2 January 2025, Kahlan was called up to the Jordan national football team for a camp held in Amman. Kahlan was called up once again to the national team to participate in a training camp held in Doha.
