= Keano Vanrafelghem =

Belgian footballer (born 2003)

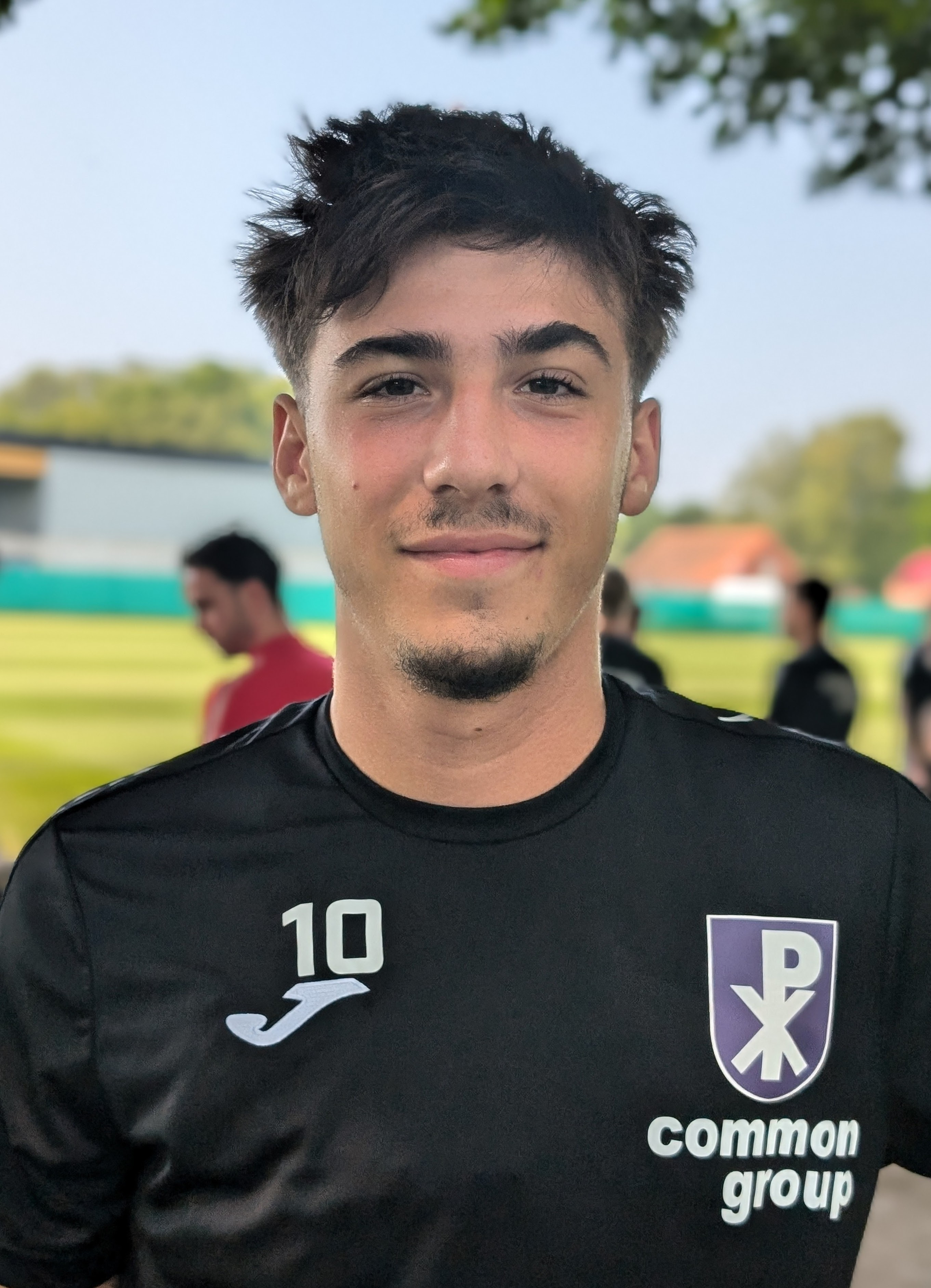
- Vanrafelghem in 2024

Personal information
- Date of birth: 2 August 2003 (age 23)
- Place of birth: Torhout, Belgium
- Height: 5 ft 7 in (1.70 m)
- Position: Forward

Team information
- Current team: Mechelen
- Number: 27

Youth career
- Club Brugge

Senior career*
Years	Team	Apps	(Gls)
2020–2023	Club NXT	12	(0)
2023–2025	Patro Eisden	19	(8)
2023–2024	→ Sporting Hasselt (loan)	32	(19)
2025–	Mechelen	27	(4)
2025	Mechelen II	4	(2)

International career
2018	Belgium U15	1	(0)
- * Club domestic league appearances and goals as of 31 May 2026

Keano Vanrafelghem (born 2 August 2003) is a Belgian professional footballer who plays as a forward for Belgian Pro League club Mechelen.

== Club career ==
Vanrafelghem began his career at the youth academy of Club Brugge. On 22 August 2020, he made his debut for Brugge's reserve side, Club NXT in the Belgian First Division B against RWDM47. He came on as an 85th-minute substitute as NXT lost 2–0.

On 31 January 2023, Vanrafelghem signed with Patro Eisden. On 31 August 2023, he was loaned to Sporting Hasselt.

On 16 January 2025, Vanrafelghem joined Mechelen on a four-and-a-half-year deal. He debuted ten days later, coming on at half-time in a 4–1 league defeat away to Anderlecht. On 29 March, he scored his first goal for the club, making it 2–2 in an away draw at Standard Liège. In May, he suffered an abdominal/adductor injury that curtailed his season, and in July the club announced he would undergo surgery, ruling him out for several months; the operation was performed successfully in early August.

== Career statistics ==
As of match played 26 April 2025

Appearances and goals by club, season and competition
Club	Season	League			Cup		Other		Total	
Club	Season	Division	Apps	Goals	Apps	Goals	Apps	Goals	Apps	Goals
Club NXT	2020–21	1B Pro League	10	0	—		—		10	0
Club NXT	2021–22	1B Pro League	0	0	—		—		0	0
Club NXT	2022–23	Challenger Pro League	2	0	—		—		2	0
Club NXT	Total		12	0	—		—		12	0
Patro Eisden	2022–23	National Division 1	4	0	0	0	—		4	0
Patro Eisden	2023–24	Challenger Pro League	0	0	0	0	—		0	0
Patro Eisden	2024–25	Challenger Pro League	15	8	3	0	—		18	8
Patro Eisden	Total		19	8	3	0	—		22	8
Sporting Hasselt (loan)	2023–24	Belgian Division 2	32	19	0	0	—		32	19
Mechelen	2024–25	Belgian Pro League	11	1	—		—		11	1
Career total			74	28	3	0	0	0	77	28
