= Mathis Servais =

Belgian footballer

Personal information
- Date of birth: 23 November 2004 (age 21)
- Place of birth: Namur, Belgium
- Height: 1.83 m (6 ft 0 in)
- Position: Midfielder

Team information
- Current team: Millwall
- Number: 8

Youth career
- –2020: Club Brugge

Senior career*
Years	Team	Apps	(Gls)
2020–2023	Club NXT	25	(4)
2021	Club Brugge	0	(0)
2023–2025	Beveren	55	(10)
2025–2026	Mechelen	32	(2)
2026–	Millwall	0	(0)

International career^{‡}
2019–2020	Belgium U16	7	(1)
2021–2022	Belgium U18	10	(2)
2025–	Belgium U21	6	(0)
- * Club domestic league appearances and goals as of 31 May 2026 ‡ National team caps and goals as of 08:25, 31 March 2026 (UTC)

Mathis Servais (born 23 November 2004) is a Belgian professional footballer who plays as a midfielder for EFL Championship side Millwall.

== Club career ==
On 8 June 2023, Servais signed a three-year contract with Beveren.

On 9 September 2025, Servais moved to Mechelen with a four-season contract.

== Career statistics ==
As of match played 29 August 2025

Appearances and goals by club, season and competition
Club	Season	League			Belgian Cup		Other		Total	
Club	Season	Division	Apps	Goals	Apps	Goals	Apps	Goals	Apps	Goals
Club NXT	2020–21	Belgian First Division B	10	2	—		—		10	2
Club NXT	2022–23	Challenger Pro League	15	2	—		—		15	2
Club NXT	Total		25	4	0	0	0	0	25	4
SK Beveren	2023–24	Challenger Pro League	22	1	3	0	—		25	1
SK Beveren	2024–25	Challenger Pro League	31	8	2	0	—		33	8
SK Beveren	2025–26	Challenger Pro League	4	1	0	0	—		4	1
SK Beveren	Total		57	10	5	0	0	0	62	10
Career total			1	0	0	0	0	0	1	0
