= Shion Shinkawa =

Japanese footballer (born 2007)

- Shinkawa at the Azerbaijan v. Japan U-20 tournament, 2026

Personal information
- Date of birth: 6 August 2007 (age 19)
- Place of birth: Osaka, Japan
- Height: 1.71 m (5 ft 7 in)
- Position: Midfielder

Team information
- Current team: Sint-Truiden
- Number: 99

Youth career
- –2025: Sagan Tosu

Senior career*
Years	Team	Apps	(Gls)
2025	Sagan Tosu	33	(5)
2026–	Sint-Truiden	4	(0)

International career^{‡}
2025	Japan U18	4	(0)
2025–	Japan U23	4	(0)
- * Club domestic league appearances and goals as of 31 May 2026 ‡ National team caps and goals as of 9 September 2025

Shion Shinkawa (新川 志音, Shinkawa Shion; born 6 August 2007) is a Japanese professional footballer who plays as a midfielder for Belgian Pro League club Sint-Truiden.

== Club career ==
As a youth player, Shinkawa joined the youth academy of Japanese side Sagan Tosu and was promoted to the club's senior team ahead of the 2025 season, where he made thirty-three league appearances and scored five goals. Following his stint there, he signed for Belgian side STVV in 2026.

== International career ==
Shinkawa is a Japan youth international. During September 2025, he played for the Japan national under-23 football team for 2026 AFC U-23 Asian Cup qualification.

== Style of play ==
Shinkawa plays as a midfielder. Japanese news website Shogun Soccer wrote in 2026 that he "is quite good at taking down lofted balls and is able to drive forward on the half turn when peeling out wide. In these situations he can take the ball in his stride with his good touch and shield the ball, riding contact with momentum in his favor".
