= Robert-Jan Vanwesemael =

French footballer (born 2002)

Personal information
- Date of birth: 11 May 2002 (age 24)
- Place of birth: Belgium
- Height: 1.76 m (5 ft 9 in)
- Position: Right-back

Team information
- Current team: STVV
- Number: 60

Youth career
- 2007–2009: SK Meldert
- 2009–2017: Genk
- 2017–2022: STVV

Senior career*
| Years | Team | Apps | (Gls) |
| 2022– | STVV | 88 | (2) |
| 2022–2023 | →Tienen (loan) | 37 | (2) |
- * Club domestic league appearances and goals as of 31 May 2026

Robert-Jan Vanwesemael (born 11 May 2002) is a Belgian professional football player who plays as a right-back for Belgian Pro League club STVV.

== Club career ==
Vanwesemael is a product of the youth academies of the Belgian clubs SK Meldert, Genk, and STVV. In April 2021, he signed his first professional contract with STVV. On 18 June 2022, he joined Tienen on a season-loan in the Belgian Division 1. On 28 April 2023, he extended his contract with STVV and was promoted to their senior side. On 15 August 2024, he extended his contract with the club until 2026.
