= Kaito Matsuzawa =

Japanese footballer (born 2001)

Personal information
- Date of birth: 5 February 2001 (age 25)
- Place of birth: Shizuoka Prefecture, Japan
- Height: 1.76 m (5 ft 9 in)
- Position: Midfielder

Team information
- Current team: Sint-Truiden
- Number: 38

Youth career
- 2016–2018: Fuji Municipal High School

College career
Years	Team	Apps	(Gls)
2019–2022	Nagoya University of Economics		

Senior career*
Years	Team	Apps	(Gls)
2023–2025	V-Varen Nagasaki	63	(4)
2025–	Sint-Truiden	32	(2)
- * Club domestic league appearances and goals as of 31 May 2026

Kaito Matsuzawa (松澤 海斗, Matsuzawa Kaito; born 5 February 2001) is a Japanese professional footballer who plays as a midfielder for Belgian Pro League club Sint-Truiden.

== Early life ==
Matsuzawa was born on 5 February 2001 in Shizuoka Prefecture, Japan. Growing up, he regarded Brazil international Neymar as his football idol and attended Fuji Municipal High School in Japan. Afterwards, he attended the Nagoya University of Economics in Japan.

== Career ==
Matsuzawa started his career with Japanese side V-Varen Nagasaki in 2023, where he made sixty-three league appearances and scored four goals. On 22 July 2023, he debuted for the club during a 1–5 away loss to Montedio Yamagata in the league.

Following his stint there, he signed for Belgian side Sint-Truiden ahead of the 2025–26 season.

== Style of play ==
Matsuzawa plays as a midfielder. Japanese news website Gekisaka wrote in 2025 that he "excels with his excellent technique and dribbling skills".
