= Taiga Hata =

Japanese association football player

Taiga Hata 畑 大雅
Personal information
- Full name: Taiga Hata
- Date of birth: 20 January 2002 (age 24)
- Place of birth: Nishitama District, Tokyo, Japan
- Height: 1.75 m (5 ft 9 in)
- Positions: Wing-back; winger

Team information
- Current team: Sint-Truiden
- Number: 3

Youth career
- 2008–2010: Matsubayashi Shonen
- 2011–2016: AZ'86 Tokyo Ome
- 2017–2019: Ichiritsu Funabashi High School

Senior career*
Years	Team	Apps	(Gls)
2020–2025	Shonan Bellmare	128	(4)
2025–	Sint-Truiden	32	(1)

International career
2018–2019	Japan U17	13	(0)
- * Club domestic league appearances and goals as of 31 May 2026

Taiga Hata (畑 大雅, Hata Taiga; born 20 January 2002) is a Japanese professional footballer who plays either as a wing-back or as a winger for Belgian Pro League club Sint-Truiden.

== Career ==
=== Shonan Bellmare ===
On 30 August 2019, it was announced that Hata would join Shonan Bellmare from the 2020 season.

=== Sint-Truiden ===
On 4 July 2025, Sint-Truiden announced the signing of Hata.

== International career ==
Hata was part of the Japan U-17 squad for the 2019 FIFA U-17 World Cup.

== Personal life ==
Born in Japan, Hata is of American descent through his grandfather, an American soldier stationed in Japan.

== Career statistics ==
As of match played 20 September 2026

Appearances and goals by club, season and competition
Club	Season	League			National cup (Note: Includes Emperor's Cup, Belgian Cup)		League cup (Note: Includes J.League Cup)		Other		Total	
Club	Season	Division	Apps	Goals	Apps	Goals	Apps	Goals	Apps	Goals	Apps	Goals
Shonan Bellmare	2020	J1 League	15	0	0	0	2	0	0	0	17	0
Shonan Bellmare	2021	J1 League	22	0	1	0	4	0	0	0	27	0
Shonan Bellmare	2022	J1 League	18	0	0	0	2	0	0	0	20	0
Shonan Bellmare	2023	J1 League	23	0	2	0	4	0	0	0	29	0
Shonan Bellmare	2024	J1 League	30	4	1	0	1	0	0	0	32	4
Shonan Bellmare	2025	J1 League	20	0	0	0	4	0	0	0	24	0
Shonan Bellmare	Total		128	4	4	0	17	0	0	0	149	4
Sint-Truiden	2025–26	Belgian Pro League	32	1	1	0	—		—		33	1
Sint-Truiden	2026–27	Belgian Pro League	7	0	0	0	—		1 (Note: Appearance in UEFA Europa League)	0	8	0
Sint-Truiden	Total		39	1	1	0	—		1	0	41	1
Career total			167	5	5	0	17	0	1	0	190	5
