= Keisuke Gotō =

Japanese footballer (born 2005)

Personal information
- Date of birth: 3 June 2005 (age 21)
- Place of birth: Hamamatsu, Shizuoka, Japan
- Height: 1.91 m (6 ft 3 in)
- Position: Forward

Team information
- Current team: SC Freiburg
- Number: 42

Youth career
- 2012–2017: Kawai SC
- 2018–2022: Júbilo Iwata

Senior career*
Years	Team	Apps	(Gls)
2022–2023	Júbilo Iwata	33	(7)
2024	→ RSCA Futures (loan)	14	(6)
2024–2026	RSCA Futures	16	(7)
2025–2026	Anderlecht	6	(2)
2025–2026	→ Sint-Truiden (loan)	38	(11)
2026–	SC Freiburg	7	(1)

International career^{‡}
2020	Japan U16	4	(0)
2022–2023	Japan U18	2	(1)
2025	Japan U20	1	(0)
2025–	Japan	6	(0)
- * Club domestic league appearances and goals as of 31 October 2026 ‡ National team caps and goals as of 28 September 2026

Keisuke Gotō (後藤 啓介, Gotō Keisuke; born 3 June 2005) is a Japanese professional footballer who plays as a forward for Bundesliga club SC Freiburg and the Japan national team.

== Club career ==
=== Júbilo Iwata ===
Born in Hamamatsu, Shizuoka Prefecture, Gotō joined Júbilo Iwata's academy in 2018; he then came through the club's youth ranks, while attending Iwata Higashi High School, and made his first-team debut on 20 July 2022, coming on as a substitute against Tokyo Verdy in the fourth round of the Emperor's Cup. In October of the same year, he signed his first professional contract with the club.

In January 2023, Gotō was officially promoted to Iwata's senior team ahead of the 2023 J2 League season. On 18 February 2023, he made his league debut aged 17 years and 260 days, coming on as a substitute for Kenyu Sugimoto in the 64th minute before scoring a brace in a 3–2 home defeat to Fagiano Okayama, breaking Iwata's club record for youngest scorer previously held by Naohiro Takahara, who scored aged 18 years and 290 days. On 18 March, Gotō made his first professional start in a 2–2 draw against Shimizu S-Pulse in the Shizuoka derby and scored in the 2nd minute. Throughout the season, the striker scored seven goals in 33 league appearances for Iwata, helping the team finish second in the league table and, as a result, gain promotion back to the J1 League after a single year of absence.

=== Anderlecht ===
On 28 November 2023, Belgian Pro League side Anderlecht announced that Gotō would join the team on a season-long loan, with an option to buy, starting from 1 January 2024. He was initially assigned to the club's reserve team, RSCA Futures.

On 12 January 2024, he made his debut for RSCA Futures, scoring a penalty kick in a 1–1 league draw against Beerschot. Gotō finished the season with six goals and one assist from 14 appearances. On 5 December, Anderlecht permanently signed Gotō until June 2028.

On 16 January 2025, he made his debut for Anderlecht, coming off the bench in the 40th minute in a 1–0 win against Antwerp in the 1st leg of the Belgian Cup semifinals. On 19 January, Gotō made his league debut against K.V. Kortrijk, replacing Luis Vázquez in the 83rd minute. On 26 January, he made his first start for Anderlecht, scoring a header in the 24th minute assisted by Thorgan Hazard in a 4–1 victory against K.V. Mechelen. On 30 January, Gotō made his UEFA Europa League debut against TSG 1899 Hoffenheim, in which he scored in the 79th minute, making the game 2–4. Anderlecht went on to lose the match 3–4. Gotō spent most of the 2024–25 season with RSCA Futures, making 16 appearances for them; scoring seven while assisting two. For Anderlecht, Gotō made ten appearances in all competitions and scored three goals.

==== Loan to Sint-Truiden ====
On 7 August 2025, Gotō was loaned out to fellow Belgian Pro League club Sint-Truiden on a deal excluding an option to buy. Gotō played his first game for Sint-Truiden on 8 August against Dender, coming on in the 80th minute for Andrés Ferrari. Gotō scored his first goal for Sint-Truiden against La Louvière in the 91st minute assisted by Rihito Yamamoto on 17 August, making the game 2–1. On 3 December, Gotō scored a brace in a 3–3 draw against Antwerp in the Croky Cup. However, Sint-Truiden lost the game on penalties, eliminating them from the tournament. On 26 December, Gotō scored another brace, this time against Standard Liège in a 2–1 win in the Pro League. On 16 January 2026, Gotō won the Pro League December Player of the Month award after scoring three goals with one assist. On 21 February, Gotō assisted twice in a 2–1 win against Dender. On 3 May, Gotō caused controversy after celebrating a 2–0 win against parent club Anderlecht at full-time after scoring in the 75th minute, which infuriated some players on the opposition side. This incident created speculation that Gotō might not play for Anderlecht again. On 12 May, Gotō helped Sint-Truiden secure their place in the 2026–27 UEFA Conference League after a 0–2 loss against Club Brugge, the first time they have participated in an European competition since 2003.

=== SC Freiburg ===
On 11 June 2026, Gotō signed for SC Freiburg of the Bundesliga for a fee around €13 million. Gotō's first official game was a 2026–27 UEFA Conference League qualifier match against Scottish side Motherwell, where he found the net, scoring a header from a corner in the 96th minute. Gotō also scored in the return fixture on 28 August, netting a goal in a 4–1 win. On 30 August, Gotō replaced Yuito Suzuki to make his Bundesliga debut against Werder Bremen in the 79th minute. He was booked for a challenge and failed to find the net. Gotō's first Bundesliga goal came on 11 October against Schalke 04, where he came on as a substitute in the 69th minute and headed a cross from Vincenzo Grifo past Loris Karius in the 85th minute. Gotō made his first league start of the year on 18 October against Bayer Leverkusen, but failed to take a shot on goal as he was substituted in the 64th minute for Lucas Höler. On 29 October, Gotō scored a brace in Freiburg's 3–2 win in the DFB-Pokal against 2. Bundesliga side VfL Wolfsburg after coming off the bench.

== Style of play ==
Gotō is a centre-forward known for his physical presence, aerial ability, movement off the ball and positional awareness in the penalty area. he combines considerable height and strength with notable pace for a player of his stature. His playing style blends the characteristics of a traditional target man with those of a mobile penalty-box striker, allowing him to operate both as a focal point for attacking play and as a forward who exploits space behind opposing defences.

One of his main strengths is his movement in and around the penalty area. He demonstrates an ability to time his runs behind defenders, exploit their blind spots and position himself effectively to receive crosses and through balls. He frequently attacks both the near and far posts, using his positional awareness to find space between opposing defenders. His movement allows him to create scoring opportunities without requiring prolonged involvement in possession.

Gotō is particularly effective in aerial situations. His height, jumping ability and timing enable him to compete for crosses and long balls, while his previous experience playing volleyball has helped develop his sense of timing when attacking aerial deliveries. In an interview, he explained that his volleyball background had influenced his heading ability, particularly his understanding of the optimal moment to make contact with the ball. He has also stated that he can reach running speeds of approximately 34–35 km/h, highlighting his pace as an additional asset alongside his physical presence.

Despite primarily developing as a striker, Gotō has experience playing in midfield and other positions during his youth career. He has described himself as aspiring to become a versatile player capable of performing in different roles. This background has contributed to his understanding of positional movement and the timing of passes and runs, although his development in European football has increasingly focused on his role as a centre-forward.

== International career ==
Gotō was a youth international for Japan, having represented the under-18 national team.

On 6 November 2025, Gotō was called up to play for Japan by head coach Hajime Moriyasu to play in the Kirin Challenge Cup for a set a matches against Ghana and Bolivia. On 15 November, Gotō made his national team debut when he replaced Ayase Ueda in the 75th minute in a 2–0 win against Ghana.

On 19 March 2026, Gotō was selected for Japan's friendlies against Scotland and England. On 29 March, Gotō made his first international start against Scotland, but failed to find the back of the net.

On 15 May 2026, Gotō was selected in Japan's 26-man roster for the 2026 FIFA World Cup. He was the youngest member of the squad. Gotō made his World Cup debut when he replaced Ayase Ueda in the 84th minute of a group stage fixture against Tunisia, which ended in a 4–0 win. Gotō's appearance at 21 years and 17 days old made him the second youngest Japanese player to feature in the World Cup.

== Personal life ==
On 31 March 2026, in response to being compared to Erling Haaland, Gotō revealed that his footballing idol was Harry Kane, who plays for Bundesliga club Bayern Munich. Gotō also mentioned that he tries to imitate Shunsuke Nakamura's free-kick technique.

== Career statistics ==
=== Club ===
As of match played 31 October 2026

Appearances and goals by club, season and competition
Club	Season	League			National cup (Note: Includes Emperor's Cup, Belgian Cup, DFB-Pokal)		League cup (Note: Includes J.League Cup)		Continental		Total	
Club	Season	Division	Apps	Goals	Apps	Goals	Apps	Goals	Apps	Goals	Apps	Goals
Júbilo Iwata	2022	J1 League	0	0	1	0	—		—		1	0
Júbilo Iwata	2023	J2 League	33	7	1	0	5	0	—		39	7
Júbilo Iwata	Total		33	7	2	0	5	0	—		40	7
RSCA Futures (loan)	2023–24	Challenger Pro League	14	6	—		—		—		14	6
RSCA Futures (loan)	2024–25	Challenger Pro League	15	5	—		—		—		15	5
RSCA Futures (loan)	Total		29	11	—		—		—		29	11
RSCA Futures	2024–25	Challenger Pro League	2	2	—		—		—		2	2
Anderlecht	2024–25	Belgian Pro League	7	2	1	0	—		2 (Note: Appearances in UEFA Europa League)	1	10	3
Sint-Truiden (loan)	2025–26	Belgian Pro League	38	11	2	2	—		—		40	13
SC Freiburg	2026–27	Bundesliga	7	1	3	3	—		3 (Note: Appearances in UEFA Conference League)	2	12	4
Career total			116	32	7	4	5	0	5	3	133	39
