= Rihito Yamamoto =

Japanese footballer (born 2001)

Rihito Yamamoto 山本 理仁
Personal information
- Date of birth: 12 December 2001 (age 24)
- Place of birth: Kanagawa, Japan
- Height: 1.79 m (5 ft 10 in)
- Position: Defensive midfielder

Team information
- Current team: SC Freiburg
- Number: 20

Youth career
- Tsukui Chuo FC
- –2019: Tokyo Verdy

Senior career*
| Years | Team | Apps | (Gls) |
| 2019–2022 | Tokyo Verdy | 104 | (3) |
| 2022–2024 | Gamba Osaka | 13 | (0) |
| 2023–2024 | → Sint-Truiden (loan) | 33 | (0) |
| 2024–2026 | Sint-Truiden | 59 | (5) |
| 2026– | SC Freiburg | 1 | (0) |
| 2026 | SC Freiburg II | 3 | (0) |

International career^{‡}
| 2016 | Japan U15 | 5 | (0) |
| 2017 | Japan U16 | 1 | (0) |
| 2018 | Japan U17 | 1 | (0) |
| 2018–2019 | Japan U18 | 6 | (0) |
| 2018 | Japan U19 | 1 | (0) |
| 2023 | Japan U22 | 2 | (1) |
| 2022–2024 | Japan U23 | 22 | (2) |
Medal record
Men's football
Representing Japan
AFC U-23 Asian Cup
| Bronze medal – third place | 2022 Uzbekistan | Team |
| Gold medal – first place | 2024 Qatar | Team |
- * Club domestic league appearances and goals as of 25 October 2026 ‡ National team caps and goals as of 2 August 2024

Rihito Yamamoto (山本 理仁, Yamamoto Rihito; born 12 December 2001) is a Japanese professional footballer who plays as a defensive midfielder for Bundesliga club SC Freiburg.

== Club career ==
On 27 May 2026, Yamamoto signed a contract with German club SC Freiburg.

== International career ==
On 4 April 2024, Yamamoto was called up to the Japan U23 squad for the 2024 AFC U-23 Asian Cup.

== Career statistics ==
As of match played 25 October 2026

Appearances and goals by club, season and competition
| Club | Season | League | | | National cup (Note: Includes Emperor's Cup, Belgian Cup) | | League cup (Note: Includes J.League Cup) | | Continental | | Other | | Total | |
| Club | Season | Division | Apps | Goals | Apps | Goals | Apps | Goals | Apps | Goals | Apps | Goals | Apps | Goals |
|---|---|---|---|---|---|---|---|---|---|---|---|---|---|---|
| Tokyo Verdy | 2019 | J2 League | 22 | 0 | 1 | 0 | — | | — | | — | | 23 | 0 |
| Tokyo Verdy | 2020 | J2 League | 35 | 1 | 0 | 0 | — | | — | | — | | 35 | 1 |
| Tokyo Verdy | 2021 | J2 League | 30 | 1 | 1 | 0 | — | | — | | — | | 31 | 1 |
| Tokyo Verdy | 2022 | J2 League | 17 | 1 | 0 | 0 | — | | — | | — | | 17 | 1 |
| Tokyo Verdy | Total | | 104 | 3 | 2 | 0 | — | | — | | — | | 106 | 3 |
| Gamba Osaka | 2022 | J1 League | 2 | 0 | 0 | 0 | — | | — | | — | | 2 | 0 |
| Gamba Osaka | 2023 | J1 League | 11 | 0 | 0 | 0 | 4 | 0 | — | | — | | 15 | 0 |
| Gamba Osaka | Total | | 13 | 0 | 0 | 0 | 4 | 0 | — | | — | | 17 | 0 |
| Sint-Truiden (loan) | 2023–24 | Belgian Pro League | 33 | 0 | 2 | 0 | — | | — | | — | | 35 | 0 |
| Sint-Truiden | 2024–25 | Belgian Pro League | 21 | 0 | 2 | 0 | — | | — | | — | | 23 | 0 |
| Sint-Truiden | 2025–26 | Belgian Pro League | 38 | 5 | 2 | 0 | — | | — | | — | | 40 | 5 |
| Sint-Truiden | Sint-Truiden total | | 92 | 5 | 6 | 0 | — | | — | | — | | 98 | 5 |
| SC Freiburg | 2026–27 | Bundesliga | 1 | 0 | 0 | 0 | — | | 0 | 0 | — | | 1 | 0 |
| SC Freiburg II | 2026–27 | Regionalliga Südwest | 3 | 0 | — | | — | | — | | — | | 3 | 0 |
| Career total | | | 213 | 8 | 8 | 0 | 4 | 0 | 0 | 0 | 0 | 0 | 225 | 8 |

== Honours ==
Japan U23

- AFC U-23 Asian Cup: 2024
