= Ryōtarō Itō =

Japanese footballer (born 1998)

Ryōtarō Itō 伊藤 涼太郎
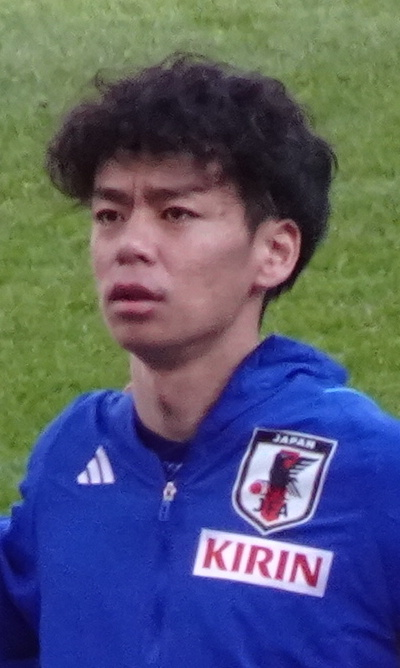

Personal information
- Date of birth: 6 February 1998 (age 28)
- Place of birth: Ōsaka, Ōsaka, Japan
- Height: 1.75 m (5 ft 9 in)
- Position: Midfielder

Team information
- Current team: Valladolid
- Number: 10

Youth career
- Avanti Kansai FC
- 2010–2012: Cerezo Osaka
- 2013–2015: Sakuyo High School

Senior career*
Years	Team	Apps	(Gls)
2016–2021	Urawa Red Diamonds	7	(0)
2017–2018	→ Mito HollyHock (loan)	40	(9)
2019	→ Oita Trinita (loan)	4	(0)
2021	→ Mito HollyHock (loan)	20	(4)
2022–2023	Albirex Niigata	58	(16)
2023–2026	Sint-Truiden	104	(19)
2026–	Valladolid	1	(0)

International career^{‡}
2024–	Japan	1	(0)
Medal record
Urawa Reds
Winner	AFC Champions League	2017
Runner-up	J1 League	2016
Winner	J.League Cup	2016
- * Club domestic league appearances and goals as of 14 November 2026 ‡ National team caps and goals as of 3 July 2024

Ryōtarō Itō (伊藤 涼太郎, Itō Ryōtarō; born 6 February 1998) is a Japanese professional footballer who plays as a midfielder for Real Valladolid.

== Club career ==
Ryōtarō made his league debut for Urawa against Nagoya Grampus on 29 April 2016.

Ryōtarō made his league debut for Mito against Thespa Gunma on 24 September 2017. He scored his first league goal for the club against Kamatamare Sanuki on 11 March 2018, scoring in the 83rd minute.

Ryōtarō made his league debut for Oita against Kashima Antlers on 23 February 2019.

During his second spell at the club, Ryōtarō made his league debut for Mito against Machida Zelvia on 11 July 2021. He scored his first league goal for the club against Zweigen Kanazawa on 26 September 2021, scoring a penalty in the 40th minute.

Ryōtarō made his league debut for Albirex against Vegalta Sendai on 20 February 2022. He scored his first league goal for the club against Ventforet Kofu on 19 March 2022, scoring in the 31st minute.

Ryōtarō made his league debut for Sint-Truiden vs Standard Liège on 30 July 2023. He scored his first league goal for the club against KV Mechelen on 17 September 2023, scoring in the 63rd minute.

On 29 September 2026, Ryōtarō joined Spanish Segunda División club Real Valladolid on a contract for the rest of the season.

== International career ==
Ryōtarō made his debut for Japan against Thailand on 1 January 2024.

== Career statistics ==
=== Club ===
As of 18 March 2026

Appearances and goals by club, season and competition
Club	Season	League			National cup (Note: Includes Emperor's Cup and Belgian Cup)		League cup (Note: Includes J.League Cup)		Continental		Total	
Club	Season	Division	Apps	Goals	Apps	Goals	Apps	Goals	Apps	Goals	Apps	Goals
Urawa Red Diamonds	2016	J1 League	1	0	0	0	0	0	—		1	0
Urawa Red Diamonds	2017	J1 League	0	0	0	0	1	0	—		1	0
Urawa Red Diamonds	2020	J1 League	5	0	0	0	1	0	—		6	0
Urawa Red Diamonds	2021	J1 League	1	0	0	0	4	0	—		5	0
Urawa Red Diamonds	Total		7	0	0	0	6	0	—		13	0
Mito Hollyhock (loan)	2017	J2 League	6	0	0	0	—		—		6	0
Mito Hollyhock (loan)	2018	J2 League	34	9	1	0	—		—		35	9
Mito Hollyhock (loan)	2021	J2 League	20	4	0	0	—		—		20	4
Mito Hollyhock (loan)	Total		60	13	1	0	0	0	—		61	13
Oita Trinita (loan)	2019	J1 League	4	0	3	2	4	1	—		11	3
Albirex Niigata	2022	J2 League	42	9	0	0	—		—		42	9
Albirex Niigata	2023	J1 League	16	7	0	0	2	0	—		18	7
Albirex Niigata	Total		62	16	3	2	6	1	—		71	19
Sint-Truiden	2023–24	Belgian Pro League	36	7	1	0	—		—		37	7
Sint-Truiden	2024–25	Belgian Pro League	33	2	3	0	—		—		36	2
Sint-Truiden	2025–26	Belgian Pro League	26	7	2	0	—		—		28	7
Sint-Truiden	Total		95	16	6	0	0	0	—		101	16
Career total			228	45	13	4	16	2	0	0	257	51

=== International ===
As of match played 1 January 2024

Appearances and goals by national team and year
National team	Year	Apps	Goals
Japan	2024	1	0
Total		1	0

== Honours ==
Urawa Red Diamonds

- J.League Cup: 2016
- J1 League: 2016 Runner-up
- AFC Champions League: 2017

Albirex Niigata

- J2 League: 2022

Individual

- J2 League Best XI: 2022
- Japan Pro-Footballers Association Best XI: 2023
- Belgian Pro League Team of the Season: 2025–26
