= Ryan Merlen =

French footballer (born 2002)

Personal information
- Full name: Ryan Dylan Merlen
- Date of birth: 11 May 2002 (age 24)
- Place of birth: Lens, France
- Height: 1.88 m (6 ft 2 in)
- Position: Midfielder

Team information
- Current team: Sint-Truiden
- Number: 14

Youth career
- 2007–2009: AMS Lensoise
- 2009–2020: Lens

Senior career*
Years	Team	Apps	(Gls)
2020–2022	Lens II	35	(5)
2022–2025	Liège	89	(12)
2025–	Sint-Truiden	33	(3)

International career^{‡}
2017–2018	France U16	5	(0)
- * Club domestic league appearances and goals as of 31 May 2026 ‡ National team caps and goals as of 13:25, 27 October 2025 (UTC)

Ryan Dylan Merlen (born 11 May 2002) is a French professional football player who plays as a midfielder for Belgian Pro League club Sint-Truiden.

== Club career ==
Merlen is a product of the youth academies of the French clubs AMS Lensoise and Lens. On 26 June 2019, he signed his first professional contract with Lens, and the following year was promoted to their reserves. On 20 June 2022, he joined Belgian Division 1 club Liège. He helped the club earn promotion to the Challenger Pro League in his first season, and in the second season was named the club's Player of the Season. On 21 June 2025, he transferred to Sint-Truidense in the Belgian Pro League.

== International career ==
Merlen was called up to the France U16s for a set of friendlies in May 2017.
