= Ilias Sebaoui =

Moroccan footballer (born 2001)

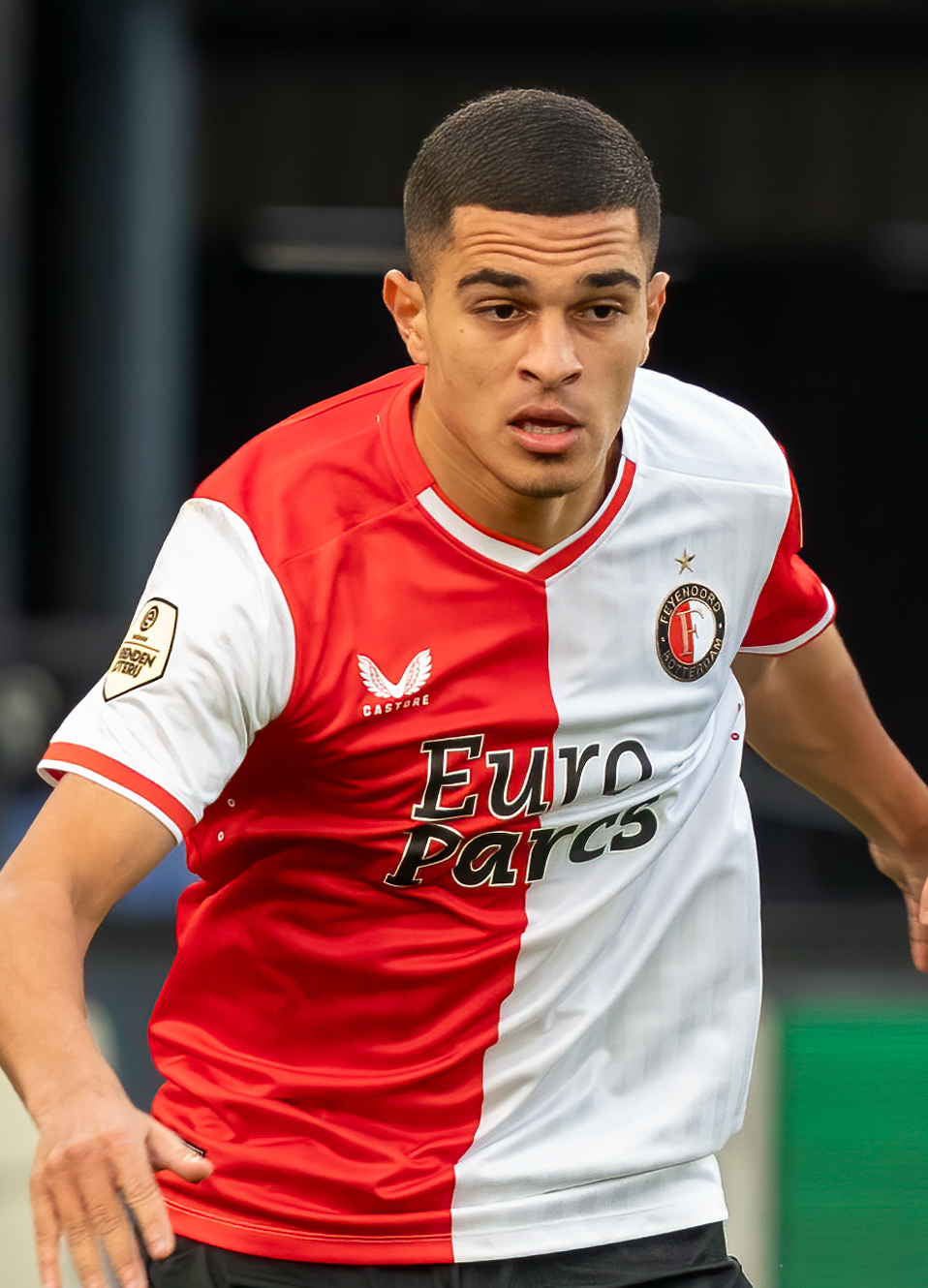
- Sebaoui with Feyenoord in 2023

Personal information
- Date of birth: 4 October 2001 (age 25)
- Place of birth: Antwerp, Belgium
- Height: 1.80 m (5 ft 11 in)
- Position: Attacking midfielder

Team information
- Current team: Sint-Truiden
- Number: 10

Youth career
- 2009–2013: Beerschot A.C.
- 2013–2015: Waasland-Beveren
- 2015–2021: Beerschot

Senior career*
Years	Team	Apps	(Gls)
2021–2023	Beerschot	38	(4)
2023–2025	Feyenoord	0	(0)
2023–2024	→ Dordrecht (loan)	38	(11)
2024–2025	→ Heerenveen (loan)	30	(3)
2025–	Sint-Truiden	40	(5)

International career
2022	Morocco U23	1	(0)
- * Club domestic league appearances and goals as of 31 May 2026

Ilias Sebaoui (Arabic: إلياس سبعاوي; born 4 October 2001) is a professional footballer who plays as an attacking midfielder for Belgian Pro League club Sint-Truiden VV. Born in Belgium, Sebaoui is a youth international for Morocco.

== Club career ==
Sebaoui began playing football with the academy of Beerschot A.C. at the age of 8, before a stint with Waasland-Beveren in 2013. In 2015, he moved to the newly formed Beerschot academy and worked his way up their youth categories often as the captain of these sides. On 27 October 2021, he debuted with Beerschot in a 4–0 Belgian Cup win over Francs Borains. On 6 February 2022, Sebaoui signed his first professional contract with Beerschot until 2025.

On 30 June 2023, Sebaoui joined Dutch club Feyenoord on a contract until 2025 with an option for another year, with him immediately going on loan to FC Dordrecht.

On 23 July 2024, Sebaoui joined Eredivisie club Heerenveen on a season-long loan deal.

On 18 June 2025, Sebaoui joined Belgian Pro League club Sint-Truiden.

== International career ==
Born in Belgium, Sebaoui is of Moroccan descent. He was called up to a training camp for the Morocco U23s in March 2022. He was then called up to the Belgium U21s for 2023 UEFA European Under-21 Championship qualification matches in June 2022. He opted to represent the Morocco U23s on 27 May 2022, for a set of friendlies with the team.

== Career statistics ==
As of match played 26 February 2024

Appearances and goals by club, season and competition
Club	Season	League			National Cup		Other		Total	
Club	Season	Division	Apps	Goals	Apps	Goals	Apps	Goals	Apps	Goals
Beerschot	2021-22	Belgian Pro League	10	3	2	0	0	0	12	3
Beerschot	2022-23	Challenger Pro League	28	1	1	0	0	0	29	1
Beerschot	Total		38	4	3	0	0	0	41	4
Feyenoord	2023-24	Eredivisie	0	0	0	0	0	0	0	0
Dordrecht (loan)	2023-24	Eerste Divisie	28	7	2	0	0	0	30	7
Career total			66	11	5	0	0	0	71	11
