= 2020–21 Waasland-Beveren season =

Waasland-Beveren
2020–21 season
- Chairman: Dirk Huyck
- Manager: Arnauld Mercier
- Stadium: Freethiel Stadion
- Belgian First Division A: 17th (relegated)
- Belgian Cup: Sixth round
- Top goalscorer: League: Daan Heymans (5); All: Daan Heymans (5)
- All statistics correct as of 8 May 2021.

The 2020–21 Waasland-Beveren season was the club's 85th season in existence and its ninth season in the top flight of Belgian football. In addition to the domestic league, Waasland-Beveren participated in this season's edition of the Belgian Cup. The season covered the period from 3 August 2020 to 30 June 2021.

== Players ==
=== First-team squad ===
As of 28 February 2021

Note: Flags indicate national team as defined under FIFA eligibility rules; some limited exceptions apply. Players may hold more than one non-FIFA nationality.

No.	Pos.	Nation	Player
1	GK	BEL	Nordin Jackers
2	DF	BEL	Vladimir Van De Wiel
3	DF	BEL	Brendan Schoonbaert
4	MF	CMR	Georges Mandjeck
6	MF	SUI	Leonardo Bertone
7	DF	GER	Andreas Wiegel
8	MF	RWA	Djihad Bizimana
9	FW	FRA	Jordan Faucher
10	FW	LUX	Danel Sinani (on loan from Norwich City)
11	FW	USA	Joseph Efford
12	FW	BEL	Alessandro Albanese
14	MF	BEL	Denzel Jubitana
15	DF	BEL	Dries Wuytens
16	MF	NOR	Sivert Heltne Nilsen
17	FW	BEL	Aboubakary Koita
18	MF	BEL	Daan Heymans

No.	Pos.	Nation	Player
20	MF	BEL	Nikola Pejcic
21	GK	BEL	Lucas Pirard
23	DF	CMR	Serge Leuko
24	DF	MAR	Amine Khammas
26	DF	SRB	Aleksandar Vukotić
27	DF	BEL	Jenthe Mertens
37	DF	POR	Miguel Vieira (on loan from İstanbul Başakşehir)
44	GK	BEL	Brent Gabriël
52	DF	BEL	Jur Schryvers
77	MF	BEL	Tom Reyners
88	MF	BEL	Milan De Mey
98	FW	ALB	Din Sula
99	FW	SUI	Michael Frey (on loan from Fenerbahçe)
—	FW	CUW	Jeremy Cijntje (on loan from Heracles Almelo)

=== Out on loan ===
Note: Flags indicate national team as defined under FIFA eligibility rules; some limited exceptions apply. Players may hold more than one non-FIFA nationality.

No.	Pos.	Nation	Player
—	DF	CRC	Alexis Gamboa (at Alajuelense)
—	MF	BEL	Matthias Verreth (at Kolding IF)
—	FW	MNE	Stefan Milošević (at Riga)

== Pre-season and friendlies ==
Win Draw Loss

11 July 2020 Friendly	Zulte Waregem (Belgium)	5–0	(Belgium) Waasland-Beveren	Belgium
16:00 CEST (UTC+2)	Bruno 28' (pen.); Berahino 45'; Vossen 61' (pen.); Sissako 78'; I. Sylla 80'

17 July 2020 Friendly	Paris Saint-Germain (France)	7–0	(Belgium) Waasland-Beveren	Paris, France
19:00 CEST (UTC+2)	Vukotić 21' (o.g.); Neymar 28' (pen.); Di María (yellow card) 43'; Icardi 47'; Mbappé 60'; Choupo-Moting 65', 67'; Mbe Soh 93'		Caufriez (yellow card) 27'; Vukotić (red card) 47'	Stadium: Parc des Princes; Attendance: 3,000; Referee: Stéphanie Frappart (France)

30 July 2020 Friendly	Sint-Truiden (Belgium)	4–1	(Belgium) Waasland-Beveren	Sint-Truiden, Belgium
15:00 CEST (UTC+2)	Ito 5', 47'; Nazon 30'; Lee 70'	Report	Milošević 51' (pen.)	Stadium: Stayen

4 August 2020 Friendly	Waasland-Beveren (Belgium)	0–2	(Belgium) Knokke	Beveren, Belgium
19:00 CEST (UTC+2)		Report	Savaete 30'; De Kuyffer 85'	Stadium: Freethiel Stadion; Attendance: 0

== Competitions ==
=== Overview ===
Competition	First match	Last match	Starting round	Final position	Record							
Competition	First match	Last match	Starting round	Final position	Pld	W	D	L	GF	GA	GD	Win %
Belgian First Division A	9 August 2020	18 April 2021	Matchday 1	17th	34	8	7	19	44	70	−26	23.53
Belgian First Division A relegation play-off	1 May 2021	8 May 2021	First leg	Runners-up	2	0	1	1	3	6	−3	0.00
Belgian Cup	3 February 2021		Sixth round	Sixth round	1	0	0	1	2	3	−1	0.00
Total					37	8	8	21	49	79	−30	21.62

Source: Soccerway

=== Belgian First Division A ===
==== League table ====
Pos	Team	Pld	W	D	L	GF	GA	GD	Pts	Qualification or relegation
14	Kortrijk	34	11	6	17	44	57	−13	39	
15	Sint-Truiden	34	10	8	16	41	52	−11	38	
16	Cercle Brugge	34	11	3	20	40	51	−11	36	
17	Waasland-Beveren (R)	34	8	7	19	44	70	−26	31	Qualification for the Relegation play-off
18	Excel Mouscron (Note: On 14 April 2021 news was released that both Excel Mouscron and Oostende had not received a Belgian professional football license for the coming season, a requirement to play at the top two levels of Belgian football. For Oostende, a lack of financial transparency, together with generally poor quality and incompleteness of the submitted report, was given as the main reason by the committee for not awarding a license, while Excel Mouscron was refused a license as besides insufficient transparency, the committee also questioned several cash flows and whether the club was creditworthy in general, also due to the fact that the wages for the months of February and March had not yet been paid at that point. For Excel Mouscron, it was already the sixth year running the license was (initially) refused, however, the club has appealed the decision with the Belgian Court for Sports Arbitrage (BAS) successfully on each occasion and intended to do so again. Oostende was planning to launch an appeal as well, with the BAS to rule on the matter for both clubs before the 10th of May. Both clubs were allowed to add new documents to their case, but in case they however still did not receive a license after appeal, knew they would have been forced to relegate to the 2021–22 Belgian Division 2 and start the season with a 3-point penalty. Both Excel Mouscron and Oostende were however eventually awarded a license after appeal, meaning Oostende remained at the top level, while Excel Mouscron only dropped one level.) (R)	34	7	10	17	32	54	−22	31	Relegation to First Division B

Source: Jupiler Pro League (in Dutch), Soccerway
Rules for classification: 1) Points; 2) Matches won; 3) Goal difference; 4) Goals scored; 5) Away matches won; 6) Away goal difference; 7) Away goals scored; 8) Play-off.
(R) Relegated

==== Results summary ====
Overall								Home						Away					
Pld	W	D	L	GF	GA	GD	Pts	W	D	L	GF	GA	GD	W	D	L	GF	GA	GD
34	8	7	19	44	70	−26	31	3	2	12	21	40	−19	5	5	7	23	30	−7

Source: Jupiler Pro League

==== Results by round ====
Round	1	2	3	4	5	6	7	8	9	10	11	12	13	14	15	16	17	18	19	20	21	22	23	24	25	26	27	28	29	30	31	32	33	34
Ground	A	H	A	H	A	H	A	H	H	A	H	A	H	A	H	A	A	H	A	A	H	A	A	H	A	H	H	H	A	H	H	A	H	A
Result	W	L	L	L	L	L	L	D	W	W	L	D	L	D	W	W	L	L	D	L	L	D	D	L	L	L	W	D	L	L	L	W	L	W
Position	1	8	13	15	17	17	18	17	17	17	17	17	17	16	15	14	15	15	15	16	17	17	18	18	18	18	17	18	18	18	18	18	18	17

Source: Jupiler Pro League
A = Away; H = Home; W = Win; D = Draw; L = Loss

==== Matches ====
The league fixtures were announced on 8 July 2020.

9 August 2020 1	Kortrijk	1–3	Waasland-Beveren	Kortrijk
20:45 CEST (UTC+2)	Lepoint (yellow card) 45+3'; Mboyo 54' (pen.); Selemani (yellow card) 90+5'	Report	Heymans 10', 90+1', (yellow card) 81'; Vukotić (yellow card) 45+1'; Albanese (yellow card) 51'; Caufriez (yellow card) 52'; Koita 68'	Stadium: Guldensporen Stadion; Referee: Kevin van Damme

17 August 2020 2	Waasland-Beveren	1–2	Standard Liège	Beveren
19:00 CEST (UTC+2)	Bizimana (yellow card) 27'; Schryvers 60'; Mertens (yellow card) 65'; Caufriez (yellow card) 90+4'	Report	Shamir (yellow card) 16'; Raskin (yellow card) 20'; Laifis (yellow card) 40'; Amallah 67'; Bastien 70'	Stadium: Freethiel Stadion; Attendance: 0 Referee: Frederik Geldhof

22 August 2020 3	Zulte Waregem	4–1	Waasland-Beveren	Waregem
16:15 CEST (UTC+2)	Vossen 28'; Govea (yellow card) 41', (goal) 63'; Bruno 49' (pen.), 90+5'; Seck (yellow card) 84'; De Bock (yellow card) 90'	Report	Heymans 76'; Wuytens (yellow card) 86'	Stadium: Regenboogstadion; Attendance: 0 Referee: Lothar D'hondt

29 August 2020 4	Waasland-Beveren	1–3	OH Leuven	Beveren
18:30 CEST (UTC+2)	Vukotić (yellow card) 45'; Efford 51'; Caufriez (red card) 90+6'	Report	Malinov (yellow card) 23'; Mercier 30', 58'; Henry 90'	Stadium: Freethiel Stadion; Attendance: 0 Referee: Wesli De Cremer

12 September 2020 5	Club Brugge	4–1	Waasland-Beveren	Bruges
20:45 CEST (UTC+2)	Vanaken 16' (pen.), 39'; Okereke 50'; Dennis (yellow card) 52'; Krmenčík 84'	Report	Heymans 30'; Sula (yellow card) 34'; Schoonbaert (yellow card) 40'	Stadium: Jan Breydel Stadium; Attendance: 9,200; Referee: Erik Lambrechts

19 September 2020 6	Waasland-Beveren	2–4	Anderlecht	Beveren
20:45 CEST (UTC+2)	Khammas (yellow card) 45'; Bertone (yellow card) 57'; Jackers (yellow card) 59'; Sula 64'; Wuytens (yellow card) 71'; Heymans 88'	Report	Trebel 3'; Nmecha (yellow card) 15', (goal) 60' (pen.); Doku 18'; Verschaeren 55'	Stadium: Freethiel Stadion; Attendance: 1,800; Referee: Lawrence Visser

26 September 2020 7	Beerschot	3–2	Waasland-Beveren	Antwerp
16:15 CEST (UTC+2)	Tissoudali 42'; Noubissi (yellow card) 64'; Suzuki 79'; Brogno 90+6'	Report	Efford 11'; Heymans 14'; Bertone (yellow card) 82'; Schryvers (yellow card) 90+7'	Stadium: Olympisch Stadion; Attendance: 3,200; Referee: Wesli De Cremer

3 October 2020 8	Waasland-Beveren	1–1	Genk	Beveren
16:15 CEST (UTC+2)	Vukotić (yellow card) 32', (goal) 90+6'; Wiegel (yellow card) 59'; Albanese (yellow card) 73'	Report	Vandevoordt (yellow card) 17'; Hrošovský (yellow card) 39'; Onuachu 67'; Ito (yellow card) 70'	Stadium: Freethiel Stadion; Attendance: 1,750; Referee: Wim Smet

1 November 2020 11	Waasland-Beveren	1–4	Gent	Beveren
20:45 CET (UTC+1)	Vukčević (yellow card) 21'; Wiegel (yellow card) 27'; Vukotić (yellow card) 28'; Sinani 51'; Gamboa (yellow card) 53'	Report	Dorsch 28'; Yaremchuk 29', 37', 44'	Stadium: Freethiel Stadion; Attendance: 0 Referee: Erik Lambrechts

7 November 2020 12	Eupen	1–1	Waasland-Beveren	Eupen
18:30 CET (UTC+1)	Peeters (yellow card) 74'; Koch 84'	Report	Frey 11'; Vukčević (yellow card) 88'; Vukotić (yellow card) 90+2'	Stadium: Kehrwegstadion; Attendance: 0 Referee: Lothar D'hondt

21 November 2020 13	Waasland-Beveren	0–2	Cercle Brugge	Beveren
18:30 CET (UTC+1)	Mandjeck (yellow card) 45'; Vukotić (yellow card) 84' (yellow-red card) 84'; Koita (yellow card) 85'	Report	Vitinho (yellow card) 4'; Ugbo 43', 82'; Biancone (yellow card) 52'; Somers (yellow card) 65'	Stadium: Freethiel Stadion; Attendance: 0 Referee: Bram van Driessche

24 November 2020 9	Waasland-Beveren	2–0	Oostende	Beveren
17:00 CET (UTC+1)	Albanese 46', (yellow card) 70'; Sinani 61'; Frey (yellow card) 78'	Report	Sakala (yellow card) 22'; Theate (yellow card) 79'	Stadium: Freethiel Stadion; Attendance: 0 Referee: Wim Smet

28 November 2020 14	Sint-Truiden	1–1	Waasland-Beveren	Sint-Truiden
16:15 CET (UTC+1)	García 7'; De Ridder (yellow card) 45'; Colidio (yellow card) 72'; Sankhon (yellow card) 88'	Report	Wuytens (yellow card) 29'; Koita 90+2'	Stadium: Stayen; Attendance: 0 Referee: Wesley Alen

2 December 2020 10	Charleroi	0–2	Waasland-Beveren	Charleroi
17:00 CET (UTC+1)	Ilaimaharitra (red card) 45+1'; Nkuba (yellow card) 87'	Report	Heymans (yellow card) 14'; Wiegel (yellow card) 30'; Koita 35', 90+1'; Bertone (yellow card) 84'	Stadium: Stade du Pays de Charleroi; Attendance: 0 Referee: Lothar D'hondt

5 December 2020 15	Waasland-Beveren	2–0	Excel Mouscron	Beveren
16:15 CET (UTC+1)	Koita 57'; Frey (yellow card) 89', (goal) 90+2'	Report	Onana (yellow card) 35'; Da Costa (yellow card) 67'	Stadium: Freethiel Stadion; Attendance: 0 Referee: Lawrence Visser

13 December 2020 16	KV Mechelen	2–3	Waasland-Beveren	Mechelen
20:45 CET (UTC+1)	Hairemans 27'; Voet (red card) 36'; Mrabti 60'	Report	Heymans 47'; Koita 49'; Bertone 67'	Stadium: Achter de Kazerne; Attendance: 0 Referee: Alexandre Boucaut

16 December 2020 17	Gent	3–0	Waasland-Beveren	Ghent
21:00 CET (UTC+1)	Castro-Montes 25'; Yaremchuk 53'; Hanche-Olsen (yellow card) 61'; Bukari 90+1'	Report	Wiegel (yellow card) 37'; Frey (yellow card) 66'	Stadium: Ghelamco Arena; Attendance: 0 Referee: Bert Put

20 December 2020 18	Waasland-Beveren	0–3	Antwerp	Beveren
20:45 CET (UTC+1)	Wiegel (yellow card) 57'	Report	Haroun (yellow card) 24'; Refaelov 25'; Ampomah 29'; Lukaku (yellow card) 35'; Mbokani 44'; Buta (yellow card) 67'; Seck (yellow card) 76'	Stadium: Freethiel Stadion; Attendance: 0 Referee: Jonathan Lardot

27 December 2020 19	Genk	1–1	Waasland-Beveren	Genk
16:00 CET (UTC+1)	Onuachu 24'	Report	Koita 45+2'; Wuytens (yellow card) 49'; Frey (yellow card) 80'; Heymans (yellow card) 85'	Stadium: Luminus Arena; Attendance: 0 Referee: Kevin Van Damme

11 January 2021 20	Standard Liège	3–1	Waasland-Beveren	Liège
20:45 CET (UTC+1)	Bastien (yellow card) 25'; Amallah 31', 66'; Muleka (yellow card) 33'; Siquet (yellow card) 68'; Bokadi 74'	Report	Vukotić (yellow card) 57'; Wuytens 84'	Stadium: Stade Maurice Dufrasne; Attendance: 0 Referee: Christof Dierick

16 January 2021 21	Waasland-Beveren	1–5	Zulte Waregem	Beveren
18:30 CET (UTC+1)				Stadium: Freethiel Stadion; Attendance: 0

19 January 2021 22	Excel Mouscron	1–1	Waasland-Beveren	Mouscron
18:45 CET (UTC+1)				Stadium: Stade Le Canonnier; Attendance: 0

22 January 2021 23	Anderlecht	0–0	Waasland-Beveren	Anderlecht
20:45 CET (UTC+1)	Mukairu (yellow card) 74'	Report		Stadium: Constant Vanden Stock Stadium; Attendance: 0 Referee: Nathan Verboomen

26 January 2021 24	Waasland-Beveren	2–3	KV Mechelen	Beveren
18:45 CET (UTC+1)	Mandjeck (yellow card) 29'; Faucher 60', 70'; Sinani (yellow card) 77'	Report	Walsh 8'; Shved 26', 90+2'; De Camargo (yellow card) 63'	Stadium: Freethiel Stadion; Attendance: 0 Referee: Jasper Vergoote

29 January 2021 25	Antwerp	3–2	Waasland-Beveren	Antwerp
20:45 CET (UTC+1)	Lamkel Zé 18', 57'; Lukaku (yellow card) 45'; Verstraete (yellow card) 68'; Batubinsika 87'	Report	Frey 44' (pen.), 71'; Albanese (yellow card) 85'	Stadium: Bosuilstadion; Attendance: 0 Referee: Wesley Alen

6 February 2021 26	Waasland-Beveren	0–2	Club Brugge	Beveren
18:30 CET (UTC+1)	Vieira (yellow card) 65'; Vukotić (yellow card) 84'	Report	Lang 12', 90+4'	Stadium: Freethiel Stadion; Attendance: 0 Referee: Alexandre Boucaut

17 February 2021 27	Waasland-Beveren	1–0	Eupen	Beveren
17:00 CET (UTC+1)	Frey 11'; Leuko (yellow card) 29'; Albanese (yellow card) 74'; Heltne Nilsen (yellow card) 85'	Report	Peeters (penalty missed) 30'; Prevljak (yellow card) 57'; N'Dri (yellow card) 90+2'	Stadium: Freethiel Stadion; Attendance: 0 Referee: Erik Lambrechts

20 February 2021 28	Waasland-Beveren	1–1	Charleroi	Beveren
20:45 CET (UTC+1)	Koita (yellow card) 48'; Bertone (yellow card) 78'; Vukotić 87'	Report	Bruno 90+1'	Stadium: Freethiel Stadion; Attendance: 0 Referee: Kevin Van Damme

27 February 2021 29	Cercle Brugge	2–0	Waasland-Beveren	Bruges
16:15 CET (UTC+1)	Lopes 29', (yellow card) 45'; Deman (yellow card) 63'; Denkey 82'	Report	Heltne Nilsen (yellow card) 24'; Bastians (yellow card) 55'; Wuytens (yellow card) 80'; Schryvers (yellow card) 86'; Leuko (yellow card) 90+5'	Stadium: Jan Breydel Stadium; Attendance: 0 Referee: Nicolas Laforge

6 March 2021 30	Waasland-Beveren	1–2	Beerschot	Beveren
18:30 CET (UTC+1)	Heymans 8', (yellow card) 13'; Vukotić (yellow card) 90+2'	Report	Dom 34'; Holzhauser 73'; Brogno (yellow card) 80'; Radić (yellow card) 90+2'	Stadium: Freethiel Stadion; Attendance: 0 Referee: Erik Lambrechts

3 April 2021 32	Oostende	0–2	Waasland-Beveren	Ostend
16:15 CEST (UTC+2)	Jäkel (yellow card) 45+3' (yellow-red card) 76'; Gueye (red card) 89'	Report	Sinani 23'; Vukotić (yellow card) 28'; Frey 41'; Bertone (yellow card) 74'	Stadium: Diaz Arena; Attendance: 0 Referee: Wesli De Cremer

6 April 2021 31	Waasland-Beveren	2–4	Sint-Truiden	Beveren
19:00 CEST (UTC+2)	Frey 2'; Sinani (yellow card) 14'; Vukotić (red card) 27'; Verstraete (yellow card) 60', (goal) 78'; Wuytens (yellow card) 70' (yellow-red card) 73'; Faucher (yellow card) 86'	Report	Mboyo (yellow card) 20', (goal) 51', 75'; Suzuki 32', 84'	Stadium: Freethiel Stadion; Attendance: 0 Referee: Nathan Verboomen

11 April 2021 33	Waasland-Beveren	3–4	Kortrijk	Beveren
16:00 CEST (UTC+2)	Frey 17', 44', 90+3' (pen.); Schoonbaert (yellow card) 58'	Report	Gano 3'; Dewaele (yellow card) 40'; De Sart 48'; Selemani 58' (pen.), 90+6'	Stadium: Freethiel Stadion; Attendance: 0 Referee: Erik Lambrechts

18 April 2021 34	OH Leuven	1–2	Waasland-Beveren	Leuven
18:00 CEST (UTC+2)	Malinov (yellow card) 7'; Henry (yellow card) 42'; Schrijvers 47'; Aguemon (yellow card) 90+6'	Report	Sinani (yellow card) 25'; Verstraete 30', 67', (yellow card) 55'; Koita (yellow card) 70'; Schryvers (yellow card) 88'	Stadium: Den Dreef; Attendance: 0 Referee: Kevin Van Damme

==== Relegation play-off ====
1 May 2021 First leg	Seraing	1–1	Waasland-Beveren	Seraing
18:30 CEST (UTC+2)	Kilota (yellow card) 23'; Mikautadze (yellow card) 86', (goal) 90+2' (pen.); Sanogo (yellow card) 86'	Report	Schryvers (yellow card) 28'; Khammas (yellow card) 49'; Frey 70' (pen.); Mertens (yellow card) 85'	Stadium: Stade du Pairay; Attendance: 0 Referee: Lawrence Visser

8 May 2021 Second leg	Waasland-Beveren	2–5 (3–6 agg.)	Seraing	Beveren
20:45 CEST (UTC+2)	Frey 15' (pen.), (yellow card) 52'; Wuytens (yellow card) 47'; Sinani 51'; Verstraete (yellow card) 55'; Mertens (yellow card) 76'	Report	Mikautadze 22' (pen.), 70', (yellow card) 71'; Sabaouni 45+4'; Faye 62'; Bernier (yellow card) 64', (goal) 90+5'; Dietsch (yellow card) 87'	Stadium: Freethiel Stadion; Attendance: 0 Referee: Alexandre Boucaut

=== Belgian Cup ===
3 February 2021 Sixth round	Waasland-Beveren	2–3	Oostende	Beveren
20:00 CET (UTC+1)	Frey 24'; Faucher 54'	Report	McGeehan (yellow card) 30'; Gueye 40', 72', (yellow card) 69'; Hjulsager 76', (yellow card) 88'	Stadium: Freethiel Stadion; Attendance: 0

== Statistics ==
=== Squad appearances and goals ===
Last updated on 9 August 2020.

No.	Pos	Nat	Player	Total		Belgian Division		Belgian Cup	
No.	Pos	Nat	Player	Apps	Goals	Apps	Goals	Apps	Goals
Goalkeepers
21	GK	(Belgium) BEL	Lucas Pirard	1	0	1	0	0	0
44	GK	(Belgium) BEL	Brent Gabriël	0	0	0	0	0	0
Defenders
3	DF	(Belgium) BEL	Vladimir Van De Wiel	1	0	1	0	0	0
3	DF	(Belgium) BEL	Brendan Schoonbaert	0	0	0	0	0	0
7	DF	(Germany) GER	Andreas Wiegel	0	0	0	0	0	0
15	DF	(Belgium) BEL	Dries Wuytens	0	0	0	0	0	0
19	DF	(Costa Rica) CRC	Alexis Gamboa	0	0	0	0	0	0
22	DF	(Montenegro) MNE	Andrija Vukčević	1	0	1	0	0	0
23	DF	(Belgium) BEL	Maximiliano Caufriez	1	0	1	0	0	0
26	DF	(Serbia) SRB	Aleksandar Vukotić	1	0	1	0	0	0
27	DF	(Belgium) BEL	Jenthe Mertens	1	0	1	0	0	0
28	DF	(Belgium) BEL	Daam Foulon	0	0	0	0	0	0
52	DF	(Belgium) BEL	Jur Schryvers	1	0	1	0	0	0
Midfielders
8	MF	(Rwanda) RWA	Djihad Bizimana	1	0	1	0	0	0
10	MF	(Japan) JPN	Yuki Kobayashi	0	0	0	0	0	0
14	MF	(Belgium) BEL	Denzel Jubitana	0	0	0	0	0	0
18	MF	(Belgium) BEL	Daan Heymans	1	2	1	2	0	0
20	MF	(Belgium) BEL	Nikola Pejcic	0	0	0	0	0	0
29	MF	(Belgium) BEL	Matthias Verreth	0	0	0	0	0	0
77	MF	(Belgium) BEL	Tom Reyners	0	0	0	0	0	0
88	MF	(Belgium) BEL	Milan De Mey	0	0	0	0	0	0
Forwards
9	FW	(France) FRA	Jordan Faucher	0	0	0	0	0	0
11	FW	(United States) USA	Joseph Efford	1	0	1	0	0	0
12	FW	(Belgium) BEL	Alessandro Albanese	1	0	1	0	0	0
17	FW	(Belgium) BEL	Aboubakary Koita	1	1	0+1	1	0	0
98	FW	(Albania) ALB	Din Sula	0	0	0	0	0	0
99	FW	(Montenegro) MNE	Stefan Milošević	0	0	0	0	0	0
Players who have made an appearance this season but have left the club

=== Goalscorers ===
As of 17 August 2020

Rank	No.	Pos	Nat	Name	Pro League	Belgian Cup	Total
1	19	MF	(Belgium)	Daan Heymans	2	0	2
2	52	DF	(Belgium)	Jur Schryvers	1	0	1
2	17	FW	(Belgium)	Aboubakary Koita	1	0	1
Totals					4	0	4
