= 2020–21 Sint-Truidense VV season =

Sint-Truiden
2020–21 season
- Owner: DMM.com
- Chairman: David Meekers
- Manager: Peter Maes
- Stadium: Stayen
- Belgian First Division A: 15th
- Belgian Cup: Seventh round
- Top goalscorer: League: Yuma Suzuki (17); All: Yuma Suzuki (17)
Home colours	Away colours	Third colours

The 2020–21 Sint-Truidense V.V. season was the club's 97th season in existence and its sixth consecutive season in the top flight of Belgian football. In addition to the domestic league, Sint-Truiden participated in this season's edition of the Belgian Cup. The season covered the period from 1 July 2020 to 30 June 2021.

== Players ==
=== First-team squad ===
As of 31 January 2021

Note: Flags indicate national team as defined under FIFA eligibility rules; some limited exceptions apply. Players may hold more than one non-FIFA nationality.

No.	Pos.	Nation	Player
1	GK	BEL	Kenny Steppe
2	DF	JPN	Ko Matsubara
3	DF	BEL	Maximiliano Caufriez
7	FW	BEL	Ilombe Mboyo
8	DF	GUI	Ibrahima Sory Sankhon
9	FW	JPN	Yuma Suzuki
11	FW	UKR	Oleksandr Filippov
12	MF	GHA	Samuel Asamoah
13	DF	NZL	Liberato Cacace
15	FW	JPN	Keito Nakamura (on loan from Gamba Osaka)
16	FW	BEL	Steve De Ridder (captain)
18	FW	ARG	Facundo Colidio (on loan from Inter Milan)
19	MF	BEL	Stan Van Dessel
21	GK	JPN	Daniel Schmidt

No.	Pos.	Nation	Player
22	FW	BEL	Wolke Janssens
23	FW	JPN	Tatsuya Ito
24	MF	GUI	Mory Konaté
26	DF	POR	Jorge Teixeira
27	DF	BEL	Dimitri Lavalée (on loan from Mainz)
30	FW	BEL	Nelson Balongo
32	MF	USA	Chris Durkin
33	MF	BRA	Jhonny Lucas
35	GK	BEL	Wim Vanmarsenille
39	DF	ANG	Jonathan Buatu
40	DF	NGR	Junior Pius (on loan from Antwerp)
44	MF	BEL	Christian Brüls
77	DF	GRE	Georgios Vagiannidis (on loan from Inter Milan)
90	FW	HAI	Duckens Nazon
—	DF	JPN	Daiki Hashioka (on loan from Urawa Reds)

=== On loan ===
Note: Flags indicate national team as defined under FIFA eligibility rules; some limited exceptions apply. Players may hold more than one non-FIFA nationality.

No.	Pos.	Nation	Player
5	MF	ARG	Santiago Colombatto (on loan at Club León)
10	MF	KOR	Lee Seung-woo (on loan at Portimonense SC)

== Transfers ==
=== In ===
No.	Pos	Player	Transferred from	Fee	Date	Source
13	DF	(New Zealand) Liberato Cacace	(New Zealand) Wellington Phoenix		1 July 2020	

=== Out ===
No.	Pos	Player	Transferred to	Fee	Date	Source
15			TBD		1 July 2020	

== Pre-season and friendlies ==
Win Draw Loss

8 July 2020 Friendly	Geel (Belgium)	1–2	(Belgium) Sint-Truiden	Geel, Belgium
19:00 CEST (UTC+2)		Report		Stadium: De Leunen

11 July 2020 Friendly	Anderlecht (Belgium)	2–0	(Belgium) Sint-Truiden	Brussels, Belgium
12:00 CEST (UTC+2)		Report		Stadium: Complexe Sportif Neerpede - Terrein 6

11 July 2020 Friendly	Anderlecht (Belgium)	1–0	(Belgium) Sint-Truiden	Brussels, Belgium
13:00 CEST (UTC+2)		Report		Stadium: Complexe Sportif Neerpede - Terrein 6

18 July 2020 Friendly	Sint-Truiden (Belgium)	0–0	(Belgium) Beerschot	Geel, Belgium
17:00 CEST (UTC+2)		Report		Stadium: De Leunen

22 July 2020 Friendly	Westerlo (Belgium)	0–1	(Belgium) Sint-Truiden	Westerlo, Belgium
16:00 CEST (UTC+2)		Report		Stadium: Het Kuipje

25 July 2020 Friendly	Zulte Waregem (Belgium)	2–3	(Belgium) Sint-Truiden	Waregem, Belgium
16:00 CEST (UTC+2)		Report		Stadium: Regenboogstadion

30 July 2020 Friendly	Sint-Truiden (Belgium)	4–1	(Belgium) Waasland-Beveren	Sint-Truiden, Belgium
15:00 CEST (UTC+2)	Ito 5', 47'; Nazon 30'; Lee 70'	Report	Milošević 51' (pen.)	Stadium: Stayen

31 July 2020 Friendly	Eupen (Belgium)	2–2	(Belgium) Sint-Truiden	Eupen, Belgium
18:00 CEST (UTC+2)		Report		Stadium: Kehrwegstadion

6 August 2020 Friendly	Sint-Truiden (Belgium)	4–0	(Belgium) Lommel	Sint-Truiden, Belgium
10:00 CEST (UTC+2)		Report		Stadium: Stayen

17 August 2020 Friendly	Sint-Truiden (Belgium)	1–1	(Belgium) Lommel	Sint-Truiden, Belgium
15:00 CEST (UTC+2)	Lee 5'	Report	Þórðarson 7'	Stadium: Stayen

4 September 2020 Friendly	Westerlo (Belgium)	1–2	(Belgium) Sint-Truiden	Westerlo, Belgium
11:00 CEST (UTC+2)				Stadium: Het Kuipje Terrein 3

== Competitions ==
=== Overview ===
Competition	First match	Last match	Starting round	Final position	Record							
Competition	First match	Last match	Starting round	Final position	Pld	W	D	L	GF	GA	GD	Win %
Belgian First Division A	9 August 2020	18 April 2021	Matchday 1	15th	34	10	8	16	41	52	−11	29.41
Belgian Cup	3 February 2021	10 February 2021	Sixth round	Seventh round	2	1	0	1	2	1	+1	50.00
Total					36	11	8	17	43	53	−10	30.56

Source: Soccerway

=== Belgian First Division A ===
==== League table ====
Pos	Team	Pld	W	D	L	GF	GA	GD	Pts	Qualification or relegation
13	Charleroi	34	11	9	14	46	49	−3	42	
14	Kortrijk	34	11	6	17	44	57	−13	39	
15	Sint-Truiden	34	10	8	16	41	52	−11	38	
16	Cercle Brugge	34	11	3	20	40	51	−11	36	
17	Waasland-Beveren (R)	34	8	7	19	44	70	−26	31	Qualification for the Relegation play-off

Source: Jupiler Pro League (in Dutch), Soccerway
Rules for classification: 1) Points; 2) Matches won; 3) Goal difference; 4) Goals scored; 5) Away matches won; 6) Away goal difference; 7) Away goals scored; 8) Play-off.
(R) Relegated

==== Results summary ====
Overall								Home						Away					
Pld	W	D	L	GF	GA	GD	Pts	W	D	L	GF	GA	GD	W	D	L	GF	GA	GD
34	10	8	16	41	52	−11	38	6	3	8	20	20	0	4	5	8	21	32	−11

Source: Jupiler Pro League

==== Results by round ====
Round	1	2	3	4	5	6	7	8	9	10	11	12	13	14	15	16	17	18	19	20	21	22	23	24	25	26	27	28	29	30	31	32	33	34
Ground	H	A	H	A	H	A	A	H	A	H	A	H	A	H	A	H	H	A	A	H	H	A	H	A	H	A	H	A	H	A	A	H	A	H
Result	W	L	D	D	L	L	L	D	L	W	L	L	D	D	L	L	W	W	W	L	W	W	L	D	W	L	L	D	L	D	W	W	L	L
Position	4	11	10	11	14	15	16	16	17	14	15	15	16	16					14	15	15	14	15	15	14	15	15	15	15	15	15	14	15	15

Source: Jupiler Pro League
A = Away; H = Home; W = Win; D = Draw; L = Loss

==== Matches ====
The league fixtures were announced on 8 July 2020.

9 August 2020 1	Sint-Truiden	2–1	Gent	Sint-Truiden
13:30 CEST (UTC+2)	Suzuki 2'; Colombatto (yellow card) 31'; Colidio 60', (yellow card) 90'	Report	Bezus (yellow card) 30'; Plastun 43'; Owusu (yellow card) 67'	Stadium: Stayen; Referee: Jan Boterberg

16 August 2020 2	Anderlecht	3–1	Sint-Truiden	Anderlecht
18:15 CEST (UTC+2)	Mykhaylichenko 41'; Dimata 50', (yellow card) 61'; Žulj (yellow card) 52'; Tau 90+3'	Report	Sankhon (red card) 47'; Balongo 88'	Stadium: Constant Vanden Stock Stadium; Attendance: 0 Referee: Lawrence Visser

24 August 2020 3	Sint-Truiden	0–0	Oostende	Sint-Truiden
20:45 CEST (UTC+2)	Lee (yellow card) 22'; Teixeira (red card) 42'	Report	Hjulsager (yellow card) 18'; Skúlason (yellow card) 33'; D'Arpino (yellow card) 44'; Bataille (yellow card) 59' (yellow-red card) 76'; Gueye (yellow card) 77'; Tanghe (yellow card) 83'	Stadium: Stayen; Attendance: 0 Referee: Frederik Geldhof

29 August 2020 4	Eupen	1–1	Sint-Truiden	Eupen
16:15 CEST (UTC+2)	Cools (yellow card) 10'; Ngoy 13'; Heris (red card) 25'; Beck (yellow card) 45+1'; Koné (yellow card) 82'; Poulain (yellow card) 84'	Report	Asamoah (yellow card) 16'; Lucas (yellow card) 58'; Mmaee (yellow card) 63'; Colidio (yellow card) 72'; Suzuki 85' (pen.)	Stadium: Kehrwegstadion; Attendance: 0 Referee: Bert Put

13 September 2020 5	Sint-Truiden	2–3	Antwerp	Sint-Truiden
16:00 CEST (UTC+2)	Lee 1', 23'; Durkin (yellow card) 25'; Konaté (yellow card) 70' (yellow-red card) 89'	Report	Juklerød 16', 88'; Seck 33'; Batubinsika (yellow card) 41' (yellow-red card) 72'; Haroun (yellow card) 53'; Miyoshi (yellow card) 75'	Stadium: Stayen; Attendance: 1,600; Referee: Wim Smet

21 September 2020 6	Cercle Brugge	3–0	Sint-Truiden	Bruges
20:45 CEST (UTC+2)	Hotić 25'; Ugbo 31' (pen.); Omolo (yellow card) 67'; Vitinho 90+1'	Report	Matsubara (yellow card) 13'; Colombatto (yellow card) 18'; Durkin (yellow card) 35'	Stadium: Jan Breydel Stadium; Attendance: 2,000; Referee: Wesli De Cremer

26 September 2020 7	KV Mechelen	2–0	Sint-Truiden	Mechelen
18:30 CEST (UTC+2)	Van Damme (yellow card) 23'; Vranckx 60', 64', (yellow card) 68'; Peyre (yellow card) 90+1'	Report	Colidio (yellow card) 12'; Lee (yellow card) 23'; Suzuki (yellow card) 43'; Durkin (yellow card) 45+1'; Konaté (yellow card) 65'; Sankhon (yellow card) 74'	Stadium: Achter de Kazerne; Attendance: 5,185; Referee: Nathan Verboomen

3 October 2020 8	Sint-Truiden	0–0	Kortrijk	Sint-Truiden
20:45 CEST (UTC+2)	Lee (yellow card) 44'; Asamoah (yellow card) 80'; Nazon (yellow card) 90+4'	Report	Van der Bruggen (yellow card) 27'; Selemani (red card) 71'; Jakubech (yellow card) 90+2'	Stadium: Stayen; Attendance: 1,550; Referee: Bert Put

17 October 2020 9	Beerschot	6–3	Sint-Truiden	Antwerp
18:30 CEST (UTC+2)	Holzhauser 2', 25' (pen.); Tissoudali 17', 34'; Brogno 40'; Coulibaly 57'	Report	Filippov 44'; Suzuki 49'; Nazon 74'	Stadium: Olympisch Stadion; Attendance: 3,200; Referee: Jan Boterberg

25 October 2020 10	Sint-Truiden	2–0	Standard Liège	Sint-Truiden
18:15 CET (UTC+1)	Nazon 37'; De Ridder 73', (yellow card) 80'	Report	Amallah (yellow card) 67'	Stadium: Stayen; Attendance: 0 Referee: Kevin Van Damme

7 November 2020 12	Sint-Truiden	1–2	Genk	Sint-Truiden
20:45 CET (UTC+1)	Sankhon (yellow card) 6'; Suzuki 28'; García (yellow card) 41'; De Ridder (yellow card) 53' (yellow-red card) 90+2'; Caufriez (yellow card) 87'	Report	Bongonda 4', 31', (yellow card) 81'; Thorstvedt (yellow card) 49'	Stadium: Stayen; Attendance: 0 Referee: Erik Lambrechts

23 November 2020 13	OH Leuven	2–2	Sint-Truiden	Leuven
20:45 CET (UTC+1)	Malinov (yellow card) 42'; Henry 45+2' (pen.); Eppiah 73'	Report	Nazon 27', 84', (yellow card) 28'; Durkin (yellow card) 61'; Cacace (yellow card) 90'; García (yellow card) 90+2'	Stadium: Den Dreef; Attendance: 0 Referee: Jasper Vergoote

28 November 2020 14	Sint-Truiden	1–1	Waasland-Beveren	Sint-Truiden
16:15 CET (UTC+1)	García 7'; De Ridder (yellow card) 45'; Colidio (yellow card) 72'; Sankhon (yellow card) 88'	Report	Wuytens (yellow card) 29'; Koita 90+2'	Stadium: Stayen; Attendance: 0 Referee: Wesley Alen

1 December 2020 11	Excel Mouscron	3–2	Sint-Truiden	Mouscron
17:00 CET (UTC+1)	Bakić (yellow card) 17', (goal) 18'; Koffi (yellow card) 34'; Da Costa 53'; Faraj 81'; Xadas (yellow card) 90+5'	Report	Sankhon (yellow card) 17'; García (yellow card) 37'; Suzuki 63' (pen.); Nakamura 90+1'; Janssens (yellow card) 90+2'	Stadium: Stade Le Canonnier; Attendance: 0 Referee: Christof Dierick

5 December 2020 15	Club Brugge	1–0	Sint-Truiden	Bruges
20:45 CET (UTC+1)	Okereke 57'	Report	Konaté (yellow card) 59'	Stadium: Jan Breydel Stadium; Attendance: 0 Referee: Bert Put

12 December 2020 16	Sint-Truiden	1–2	Charleroi	Sint-Truiden
20:45 CET (UTC+1)	Nazon 43'	Report	Fall 25'; Nicholson 51'	Stadium: Stayen; Attendance: 0 Referee: Bram Van Driessche

19 December 2020 18	Zulte Waregem	0–2	Sint-Truiden	Waregem
18:30 CET (UTC+1)		Report	Suzuki 56'; Caufriez 90+1'	Stadium: Regenboogstadion; Attendance: 0 Referee: Wesli De Cremer

26 December 2020 19	Standard Liège	1–2	Sint-Truiden	Liège
20:45 CET (UTC+1)	Amallah (yellow card) 39'; Muleka 71'; Balikwisha (yellow card) 75'	Report	Nazon 5'; Suzuki 16'; Asamoah (yellow card) 18'; Caufriez (red card) 53'; Konaté (yellow card) 71'	Stadium: Stade Maurice Dufrasne; Attendance: 0 Referee: Lothar D'hondt

30 December 2020 17	Sint-Truiden	1–0	Beerschot	Sint-Truiden
20:45 CET (UTC+1)	Suzuki 41'; Konaté (yellow card) 73'; Buatu (yellow card) 75'; Cacace (yellow card) 90+5'	Report		Stadium: Stayen; Attendance: 0 Referee: Christof Dierick

10 January 2021 20	Sint-Truiden	1–2	Club Brugge	Sint-Truiden
20:45 CET (UTC+1)	De Ridder (yellow card) 51'; Buatu 55'; Nazon (red card) 86'	Report	Dost 13'; Lang 35'; Mechele (yellow card) 42'; Balanta (yellow card) 77'	Stadium: Stayen; Attendance: 0 Referee: Bert Put

17 January 2021 21	Sint-Truiden	3–1	OH Leuven	Sint-Truiden
20:45 CET (UTC+1)	Suzuki 10', 53', (yellow card) 50'; Mboyo 39'; García (yellow card) 78'	Report	Henry 25'; Ngawa (red card) 37'	Stadium: Stayen; Attendance: 0 Referee: Wesli De Cremer

20 January 2021 22	Kortrijk	0–2	Sint-Truiden	Kortrijk
16:30 CET (UTC+1)				Stadium: Guldensporen Stadion; Attendance: 0

23 January 2021 23	Sint-Truiden	0–2	Excel Mouscron	Sint-Truiden
18:30 CET (UTC+1)				Stadium: Stayen; Attendance: 0

27 January 2021 24	Gent	1–1	Sint-Truiden	Ghent
21:00 CET (UTC+1)	Castro-Montes (yellow card) 78'; Schmidt 90+5' (o.g.)	Report	Colidio 23'; Teixeira (yellow card) 72'; Sankhon (yellow card) 90+4'	Stadium: Ghelamco Arena; Attendance: 0 Referee: Christof Dierick

31 January 2021 25	Sint-Truiden	3–0	Cercle Brugge	Sint-Truiden
20:45 CET (UTC+1)	Brüls 17'; Buatu (yellow card) 49'; Teixeira 64'; Cacace (yellow card) 83'; Colidio (yellow card) 90+1'; Durkin 90+4'	Report	Pavlović (yellow card) 28'; Marcelin (yellow card) 90+3'	Stadium: Stayen; Attendance: 0 Referee: Jonathan Lardot

6 February 2021 26	Oostende	3–1	Sint-Truiden	Ostend
16:15 CET (UTC+1)	Gueye 38', 60' (pen.); Sakala 74' (pen.)	Report	Lavalée (yellow card) 73'; Suzuki 90'	Stadium: Diaz Arena; Attendance: 0 Referee: Lothar D'hondt

13 February 2021 27	Sint-Truiden	1–2	Zulte Waregem	Sint-Truiden
18:30 CET (UTC+1)				Stadium: Stayen; Attendance: 0

21 February 2021 28	Antwerp	0–0	Sint-Truiden	Antwerp
20:45 CET (UTC+1)	De Laet (yellow card) 90+4'	Report	Lavalée (yellow card) 70'	Stadium: Bosuilstadion; Attendance: 0 Referee: Wesli De Cremer

28 February 2021 29	Sint-Truiden	0–2	Eupen	Sint-Truiden
20:45 CET (UTC+1)	Teixeira (red card) 61'; De Ridder (yellow card) 62'; Lavalée (yellow card) 78'	Report	Baby 41'; Miangué (yellow card) 80'; Prevljak 89'	Stadium: Stayen; Attendance: 0 Referee: Alexandre Boucaut

5 March 2021 30	Charleroi	0–0	Sint-Truiden	Charleroi
20:45 CET (UTC+1)	Rezaei (yellow card) 40'	Report	Hashioka (yellow card) 20'; Durkin (yellow card) 41'	Stadium: Stade du Pays de Charleroi; Attendance: 0 Referee: Lawrence Visser

3 April 2021 32	Sint-Truiden	2–1	KV Mechelen	Sint-Truiden
18:30 CEST (UTC+2)	Suzuki 11'; Mboyo 42' (pen.)	Report	Walsh (yellow card) 41'; Kaboré (yellow card) 65'; De Camargo 90'	Stadium: Stayen; Attendance: 0 Referee: Kevin Van Damme

6 April 2021 31	Waasland-Beveren	2–4	Sint-Truiden	Beveren
19:00 CEST (UTC+2)	Frey 2'; Sinani (yellow card) 14'; Vukotić (red card) 27'; Verstraete (yellow card) 60', (goal) 78'; Wuytens (yellow card) 70' (yellow-red card) 73'; Faucher (yellow card) 86'	Report	Mboyo (yellow card) 20', (goal) 51', 75'; Suzuki 32', 84'	Stadium: Freethiel Stadion; Attendance: 0 Referee: Nathan Verboomen

11 April 2021 33	Genk	4–0	Sint-Truiden	Genk
13:30 CEST (UTC+2)	Bongonda 21'; Heynen 24'; Thorstvedt 35'; Onuachu 53'	Report	Brüls (yellow card) 20'; Suzuki (penalty missed) 41'	Stadium: Luminus Arena; Attendance: 0 Referee: Alexandre Boucaut

18 April 2021 34	Sint-Truiden	0–1	Anderlecht	Sint-Truiden
18:00 CEST (UTC+2)	Durkin (yellow card) 33'	Report	Mykhaylichenko (yellow card) 6'; Verschaeren 80'	Stadium: Stayen; Attendance: 0 Referee: Nicolas Laforge

=== Belgian Cup ===
3 February 2021 Sixth round	Lokeren-Temse	0–2	Sint-Truiden	Lokeren
20:00 CET (UTC+1)	Nöstlinger (yellow card) 36'	Report	Nazon 8'; Ito 62'	Stadium: Daknamstadion; Attendance: 0

10 February 2021 Seventh round	Genk	1–0	Sint-Truiden	Genk
18:00 CET (UTC+1)	Thorstvedt (yellow card) 24'; Onuachu 87'	Report		Stadium: Luminus Arena; Attendance: 0 Referee: Alexandre Boucaut

== Statistics ==
=== Goalscorers ===
As of 16 August 2020

Rank	No.	Pos	Nat	Name	Pro League	Belgian Cup	Total
1	18	FW	(Argentina)	Facundo Colidio	1	0	1
1	9	FW	(Japan)	Yuma Suzuki	1	0	1
1	30	FW	(Belgium)	Nelson Balongo	1	0	1
Totals					3	0	3
