= 2019–20 Belgian First Division A =

117th season of top-tier football in Belgium

Belgian First Division A
- Season: 2019–20
- Dates: 26 July 2019 – 7 March 2020
- Champions: Club Brugge
- Champions League: Club Brugge; Gent
- Europa League: Charleroi; Antwerp; Standard Liège
- Matches: 232
- Goals: 658 (2.84 per match)
- Top goalscorer: Jonathan David; Dieumerci Mbokani (18 goals each)
- Biggest home win: Anderlecht 7–0 Zulte Waregem (7 March 2020)
- Biggest away win: Mechelen 0–5 Club Brugge (28 September 2019)
- Longest winning run: 5 matches Club Brugge
- Longest unbeaten run: 15 matches Club Brugge
- Longest winless run: 9 matches Waasland-Beveren
- Longest losing run: 5 matches Cercle Brugge
- Highest attendance: Regular season 26,769; Club Brugge 1–1 Genk (1 September 2019)
- Lowest attendance: Regular season 2,154; Eupen 1–1 Waasland-Beveren (2 August 2019)
- Total attendance: 1,011,903
- Average attendance: Regular season 10,765
- All statistics correct as of 6 October 2019.

The 2019–20 Belgian First Division A (officially known as Jupiler Pro League) was the 117th season of top-tier football in Belgium.

On 2 April 2020, the Jupiler Pro League's board of directors agreed to propose to cancel the season early during the COVID-19 pandemic. Should this proposal be accepted, Club Brugge will be awarded the title. In the meantime UEFA has threatened to ban teams in Europe in case their respective leagues were terminated early without trying to have all remaining matches completed. The decision of whether to accept this proposal was initially meant to be decided by a vote at a meeting on 15 April 2020, but had been postponed three times.

The proposal was finally accepted by the General Assembly on 15 May 2020, confirming Club Brugge as 2019–20 First Division A champions.

== Team changes ==
As 2018–19 Belgian First Division B champions, Mechelen would have replaced relegated Lokeren. However, as part of the 2017–19 Belgian football fraud scandal, Mechelen were found guilty of match-fixing at the end of the 2017–18 season, resulting in the club being relegated back to the First Division B and runners-up Beerschot taking the spot of Mechelen instead. Mechelen appealed the decision with the Belgian Court of Arbitration for Sports, which confirmed that KV Mechelen was indeed guilty of match-fixing, but that according to the rules of the Royal Belgian Football Association, relegation is no longer a possible penalty as the match-fixing occurred more than one season ago. KV Mechelen was thus allowed to play in the Belgian First Division A, but did get banned from participating in the UEFA Europa League and the Belgian Cup for one season.

== Format change ==
While the regular season remains unchanged, the end of season play-offs have been altered somewhat, specifically the Europa League play-offs will now be played by 16 instead of 12 teams. Taking part will be the bottom ten teams together with the six top teams from the Belgian First Division B, to be divided in four groups of four teams. The four group winners will play semi-finals and a final to determine the team which will play the fourth (or fifth) placed team from the championship play-offs for the remaining ticket into the UEFA Europa League. This change allows both the team relegating from the 2019–20 Belgian First Division A and the 2019–20 Belgian First Division B champion to take part in the Europa League play-offs, allowing these teams to bridge the gap of nearly six months without any matches as used to be the case in previous seasons.

== Teams ==
=== Stadiums and locations ===
Locations of the 2019–20 Belgian First Division A teams

Matricule	Club	Location	Venue	Capacity
35	Anderlecht	Anderlecht	Constant Vanden Stock Stadium	21,500
1	Antwerp	Antwerp	Bosuilstadion	12,975
12	Cercle Brugge	Bruges	Jan Breydel Stadium	29,042
22	Charleroi	Charleroi	Stade du Pays de Charleroi	14,000
3	Club Brugge	Bruges	Jan Breydel Stadium	29,042
4276	Eupen	Eupen	Kehrwegstadion	8,363
322	Genk	Genk	Luminus Arena	24,956
7	Gent	Ghent	Ghelamco Arena	20,000
19	Kortrijk	Kortrijk	Guldensporen Stadion	9,399
25	Mechelen	Mechelen	AFAS-stadion Achter de Kazerne	16,700
216	Mouscron	Mouscron	Stade Le Canonnier	10,571
31	Oostende	Ostend	Versluys Arena	8,432
373	Sint-Truiden	Sint-Truiden	Stayen	14,600
16	Standard Liège	Liège	Stade Maurice Dufrasne	30,023
4068	Waasland-Beveren	Beveren	Freethiel Stadion	8,190
5381	Zulte Waregem	Waregem	Regenboogstadion	12,500

=== Personnel and kits ===
Club	Manager	Kit Manufacturer	Sponsors
Anderlecht	(Belgium) Vincent Kompany (player/manager) and (Belgium) Franky Vercauteren (Note: Previous managers at Anderlecht during the 2019–20 season include Simon Davies & Vincent Kompany (matchday 1 to 9) and caretaker Jonas De Roeck & Vincent Kompany on matchday 10. Kompany & Vercauteren have been in charge from matchday 11.)	Joma	BNP Paribas Fortis
Antwerp	(Romania) László Bölöni	Jako	Ghelamco
Cercle Brugge	(Germany) Bernd Storck (Note: Prior to Storck, Fabien Mercadal was in charge for matchdays 1 through 10.)	Erima	Napoleon Games
Charleroi	(France) Karim Belhocine	Kappa	Proximus
Club Brugge	(Belgium) Philippe Clement	Macron	Unibet
Eupen	(Spain) Beñat San José	Nike	Aspire Academy
Excel Mouscron	(Germany) Bernd Hollerbach (Note: Hollerbach started the season at Excel Mouscron but became ill, with his duties taken over since matchday 22 by sports advisor Rudi Vata, without Vata being appointed officially as manager. For matchdays 24 through 27, Philippe Saint-Jean was in charge, having been appointed as caretaker manager. After having recovered, Hollerbach took up his position again from matchday 28.)	Uhlsport	Star Casino
Genk	(Germany) Hannes Wolf (Note: Felice Mazzù was in charge for matchdays 1 through 15, although Genk had at that point only played 14 matches as the away match at Antwerp had been postponed.)	Nike	Beobank
Gent	(Denmark) Jess Thorup	Craft	Vdk bank
Kortrijk	(Belgium) Yves Vanderhaeghe	Jako	AGO Jobs & HR
Mechelen	(Belgium) Wouter Vrancken	Jartazi	Telenet
Oostende	(Bosnia and Herzegovina) Adnan Čustović (Note: Kåre Ingebrigtsen was in charge for matchdays 1 through 21. For matchdays 22 through 28, Dennis van Wijk took over before being replaced by Adnan Čustović)	Joma	DIAZ Be
Sint-Truiden	(Slovenia) Miloš Kostić (Note: Marc Brys was in charge for matchdays 1 through 16, while Nicky Hayen held the caretaker position for matchdays 17 through 20.)	Umbro	Golden Palace
Standard Liège	(Belgium) Michel Preud'homme	New Balance	VOO
Waasland-Beveren	(Belgium) Dirk Geeraerd (caretaker) (Note: Previous managers at Waasland-Beveren during the 2019–20 season include Adnan Čustović (matchday 1 to 5), caretaker Dirk Geeraerd on matchday 6, Arnauld Mercier (matchday 7 to 27) and again Geeraerd from matchday 28.)	Uhlsport	Star Casino
Zulte-Waregem	(Belgium) Francky Dury	Patrick	Willy Naessens Group

=== Managerial changes ===
Team	Outgoing manager	Manner of departure	Date of vacancy	Position	Replaced by	Date of appointment
Oostende	(Belgium) Franky Van der Elst (caretaker)	Replaced	End of 2018–19 season	Pre-season	(Norway) Kåre Ingebrigtsen	6 May 2019
Mouscron	(Germany) Bernd Storck	End of contract	End of 2018–19 season	Pre-season	(Germany) Bernd Hollerbach	22 May 2019
Anderlecht	(France) Karim Belhocine (caretaker)	Replaced	End of 2018–19 season	Pre-season	(Wales) Simon Davies and (Belgium) Vincent Kompany	25 May 2019 and 19 May 2019
Club Brugge	(Croatia) Ivan Leko	End of contract	End of 2018–19 season	Pre-season	(Belgium) Philippe Clement	24 May 2019
Genk	(Belgium) Philippe Clement	Moved to Club Brugge	End of 2018–19 season	Pre-season	(Belgium) Felice Mazzù	3 June 2019
Cercle Brugge	(Belgium) José Jeunechamps (caretaker)	End of caretaker spell	End of 2018–19 season	Pre-season	(France) Fabien Mercadal	19 June 2019
Charleroi	(Belgium) Felice Mazzù	Moved to Genk	End of 2018–19 season	Pre-season	(France) Karim Belhocine	21 June 2019
Eupen	(France) Claude Makélélé	Mutual consent	14 June 2019	Pre-season	(Spain) Beñat San José	24 June 2019
Waasland-Beveren	(Bosnia and Herzegovina) Adnan Čustović	Sacked	26 August 2019	16th	(Belgium) Dirk Geeraerd (caretaker)	26 August 2019
Waasland-Beveren	(Belgium) Dirk Geeraerd (caretaker)	Caretaker replaced	2 September 2019 (Note: The announcement of Mercier coming in was made on 30 August 2019, however Geeraerd remained caretaker for the match of 31 August against Charleroi and Mercier would start the job only on September 2nd.)	16th	(France) Arnauld Mercier	2 September 2019
Anderlecht	(Wales) Simon Davies	Replaced	3 October 2019 (Note: The announcement of Vercauteren coming in was made on 3 October 2019, however Jonas De Roeck was appointed caretaker manager for the match of 4 October 2019 against Charleroi and Vercauteren would start the job only on October 7th.)	13th	(Belgium) Jonas De Roeck (caretaker)	3 October 2019
Anderlecht	(Belgium) Jonas De Roeck (caretaker)	Replaced	7 October 2019	13th	(Belgium) Franky Vercauteren	7 October 2019
Cercle Brugge	(France) Fabien Mercadal	Sacked	7 October 2019	16th	(Germany) Bernd Storck	12 October 2019
Genk	(Belgium) Felice Mazzù	Sacked	12 November 2019	9th	(Germany) Hannes Wolf	18 November 2019
Sint-Truiden	(Belgium) Marc Brys	Sacked	25 November 2019	11th	(Belgium) Nicky Hayen (caretaker)	25 November 2019
Oostende	(Norway) Kåre Ingebrigtsen	Became manager at APOEL FC	28 December 2019	14th	(Netherlands) Dennis van Wijk	31 December 2019
Sint-Truiden	(Belgium) Nicky Hayen (caretaker)	Caretaker replaced	2 January 2020	11th	(Slovenia) Miloš Kostić	2 January 2020
Mouscron	(Germany) Bernd Hollerbach	Temporarily replaced due to illness	5 February 2020	11th	(Belgium) Philippe Saint-Jean (caretaker)	5 February 2020
Waasland-Beveren	(France) Arnauld Mercier	Sacked	23 February 2020	16th	(Belgium) Dirk Geeraerd (caretaker)	23 February 2020
Mouscron	(Belgium) Philippe Saint-Jean (caretaker)	Hollerbach recovered from illness	25 February 2020	10th	(Germany) Bernd Hollerbach	25 February 2020
Oostende	(Netherlands) Dennis van Wijk	Sacked	2 March 2020	15th	(Bosnia and Herzegovina) Adnan Čustović	3 March 2020

== Regular season ==
=== League table ===
Pos	Team	Pld	W	D	L	GF	GA	GD	Pts	Qualification or relegation
1	Club Brugge (C)	29	21	7	1	58	14	+44	70	Qualification for the Champions League group stage
2	Gent	29	16	7	6	59	34	+25	55	Qualification for the Champions League third qualifying round
3	Charleroi	29	15	9	5	49	23	+26	54	Qualification for the Europa League third qualifying round
4	Antwerp (Y)	29	15	8	6	49	32	+17	53	Qualification for the Europa League group stage (Note: Antwerp qualified for the Europa League group stage as the 2019–20 Belgian Cup winners.)
5	Standard Liège	29	14	7	8	47	32	+15	49	Qualification for the Europa League second qualifying round
6	Mechelen	29	13	5	11	46	43	+3	44	
7	Genk	29	13	5	11	45	42	+3	44	
8	Anderlecht	29	11	10	8	45	29	+16	43	
9	Zulte Waregem	29	10	6	13	41	49	−8	36	
10	Excel Mouscron	29	9	9	11	38	40	−2	36	
11	Kortrijk	29	9	6	14	40	44	−4	33	
12	Sint-Truiden	29	9	6	14	36	53	−17	33	
13	Eupen	29	8	6	15	28	51	−23	30	
14	Cercle Brugge	29	7	2	20	27	54	−27	23	
15	Oostende	29	6	4	19	29	58	−29	22	
16	Waasland-Beveren (Note: Waasland-Beveren would have been relegated due to finishing last, however following legal proceedings the Belgian Pro League eventually voted in favour of expanding the 2020–21 Belgian First Division A to 18 teams, meaning Waasland-Beveren was spared and both OH Leuven and Beerschot were promoted from the 2019–20 Belgian First Division B.) (T)	29	5	5	19	21	60	−39	20	Reprieved from relegation

Source: Belgian First Division A (in Dutch), Soccerway
Rules for classification: 1) Points; 2) Matches won; 3) Goal difference; 4) Goals scored; 5) Away goals scored; 6) Away matches won; 7) Play-off.
(C) Champions; (T) Reprieved; (Y) Croky Cup winner

=== Results ===
Home \ Away	AND	ANT	CER	CHA	CLU	EUP	EXM	GNK	GNT	KVK	KVM	OOS	STA	STR	W-B	ZWA
Anderlecht	—	1–2	2–1	0–0	1–2	6–1	1–0	2–0	3–3	0–0	0–0	1–2	1–0	4–1	0–0	7–0
Antwerp	0–0	—	3–1	1–1	2–1	1–0	—	1–1	3–2	3–1	1–0	3–1	2–2	2–0	4–1	2–1
Cercle Brugge	1–2	1–2	—	0–3	0–2	1–2	2–2	1–2	1–0	1–3	3–2	—	0–2	2–1	1–0	2–0
Charleroi	1–2	2–1	3–0	—	0–0	1–0	1–0	2–1	1–1	—	2–1	5–0	2–0	0–3	2–0	4–0
Club Brugge	2–1	1–0	2–1	1–0	—	0–0	1–0	1–1	4–0	3–0	3–0	2–0	1–1	6–0	2–1	4–0
Eupen	0–0	1–4	1–0	1–1	—	—	2–1	2–0	2–3	1–2	0–2	1–0	1–2	0–2	1–1	1–1
Excel Mouscron	0–0	3–1	0–1	1–1	0–1	2–0	—	2–2	2–1	2–0	1–2	3–1	2–2	1–3	1–0	2–2
Genk	1–0	2–2	1–0	1–0	1–2	2–1	2–1	—	0–2	2–1	—	3–1	1–3	1–2	4–1	0–2
Gent	1–1	1–1	3–2	1–4	1–1	6–1	3–1	4–1	—	2–0	3–0	2–0	3–1	4–1	2–0	2–0
Kortrijk	4–2	0–1	1–0	1–1	2–2	1–2	1–2	0–1	0–2	—	2–3	2–2	3–1	4–0	1–3	2–0
Mechelen	2–0	3–1	3–1	2–2	0–5	1–1	2–2	3–1	0–3	1–1	—	1–0	2–3	1–2	4–0	0–2
Oostende	3–2	1–1	3–1	0–1	0–2	2–3	2–2	2–4	2–1	0–3	2–1	—	1–4	1–0	0–1	1–1
Standard Liège	1–1	1–0	2–1	1–1	0–0	3–0	4–1	1–0	0–1	2–1	1–2	2–1	—	0–0	2–0	4–0
Sint-Truiden	—	1–1	0–1	1–3	1–2	5–2	0–1	3–3 (Note: The match between Sint-Truiden and Genk was suspended with the score at 3–3 due to supporter violence. Initially, no points were awarded and the Belgian FA demanded to replay the match entirely behind closed doors and further penalize both clubs with an additional match behind closed doors, a two points penalty and a fine of 5000 Euro. On 4 December 2019, after both clubs had appealed the decision citing an incorrectly followed procedure in which the referee had stopped the match too soon, the final verdict was that the 3–3 result stood as final and both clubs were penalized 5000 Euro and were forced to play their next home match with part of their stand closed.)	0–0	2–0	0–3	1–0	2–1	—	1–1	0–0
Waasland-Beveren	0–3	0–4	1–1	0–4	1–3	0–1	1–1	0–4	—	1–2	1–3	3–1	2–1	1–0	—	1–2
Zulte Waregem	1–2	2–0	6–0	3–1	0–2	1–0	1–2	0–3	2–2	2–2	0–2	2–0	—	5–1	5–0	—

Source: Belgian Pro League (in Dutch)
Legend: Blue = home team win; Yellow = draw; Red = away team win.

== Season statistics ==
=== Top scorers ===
As of matches played on 7 March 2020.

Rank	Player	Club	Goals
1	(Democratic Republic of the Congo) Dieumerci Mbokani	Antwerp	18
1	(Canada) Jonathan David	Gent	18
3	(Belgium) Hans Vanaken	Club Brugge	13
4	(Iran) Kaveh Rezaei	Charleroi	12
5	(Israel) Lior Refaelov	Antwerp	11
6	(Ukraine) Roman Yaremchuk	Gent	10
6	(Netherlands) Michel Vlap	Anderlecht	10
6	(Belgium) Igor de Camargo	Mechelen	10
9	(Belgium) Gianni Bruno	Zulte Waregem	9

=== Clean sheets ===
As of matches played on 7 March 2020.

Rank	Player	Club	Clean sheets
1	(Belgium) Simon Mignolet	Club Brugge	16
2	(France) Nicolas Penneteau	Charleroi	12
2	(Belgium) Hendrik Van Crombrugge	Anderlecht	12
4	(Belgium) Thomas Kaminski	Gent	9
5	(Belgium) Sammy Bossut	Zulte Waregem	8
5	(Belgium) Arnaud Bodart	Standard Liège	8
7	(Belgium) Ortwin De Wolf	Eupen	6
8	(Japan) Daniel Schmidt	Sint-Truiden	5
8	(Turkey) Sinan Bolat	Antwerp	5
10	(Belgium) Gaëtan Coucke	Genk	4

=== Top assists ===
As of matches played on 7 March 2020.

Rank	Player	Club	Assists
1	(Netherlands) Ruud Vormer	Club Brugge	14
2	(Belgium) Vadis Odjidja-Ofoe	Gent	9
3	(Canada) Jonathan David	Gent	8
4	(Morocco) Mehdi Carcela	Standard Liège	7
4	(Bosnia and Herzegovina) Danijel Milićević	Eupen	7
4	(Japan) Junya Ito	Genk	7
7	(Argentina) Facundo Colidio	Sint-Truiden	6
7	(Iran) Ali Gholizadeh	Charleroi	6
7	(Belgium) Nikola Storm	Mechelen	6
7	(Belgium) Onur Kaya	Mechelen	6

== Awards ==
=== Annual awards ===
Award	Winner	Club
Golden Bull (Top scorer)	(Democratic Republic of the Congo) Dieumerci Mbokani	Antwerp
Belgian Golden Shoe	(Israel) Lior Refaelov	Antwerp

Team of the Season
Goalkeeper	(Belgium) Simon Mignolet (Club Brugge)			
Defence	(Kosovo) Mergim Vojvoda (Standard Liège)	(Belgium) Steeven Willems (Charleroi)	(Ivory Coast) Jhon Lucumí (Genk)	(Iran) Milad Mohammadi (Gent)
Midfield	(Belgium) Vadis Odjidja-Ofoe (Gent)		(Japan) Ryota Morioka (Charleroi)	(Canada) Jonathan David (Gent)
Attack	(Senegal) Krépin Diatta (Club Brugge)		(Iran) Kaveh Rezaei (Charleroi)	(Belgium) Nacer Chadli (Anderlecht)
