= 2019–20 1. FC Nürnberg season =

1. FC Nürnberg
2019–20 season
- Manager: Damir Canadi (until 5 November); Jens Keller (from 13 November until 29 June 2020); Michael Wiesinger (from 29 June)
- Stadium: Max-Morlock-Stadion
- 2. Bundesliga: 16th
- DFB-Pokal: Second round
- Top goalscorer: League: Robin Hack (10); All: Robin Hack (10)
- Highest home attendance: 44,497 vs Hamburg
- Lowest home attendance: 25,094 vs Sandhausen
- Average home league attendance: 29,618
Home colours	Away colours	Third colours

The 2019–20 1. FC Nürnberg season is the 120th season in the club's football history, having been relegated from the Bundesliga in the previous season. The season covers a period from 1 July 2019 to 30 June 2020.

== Players ==
Note: Flags indicate national team as defined under FIFA eligibility rules; some limited exceptions apply. Players may hold more than one non-FIFA nationality.

No.	Pos.	Nation	Player
1	GK	GER	Patric Klandt
3	DF	GRE	Konstantinos Mavropanos (on loan from Arsenal)
4	DF	DEN	Asger Sørensen
5	MF	GER	Johannes Geis
6	DF	GER	Tim Handwerker
7	FW	GER	Felix Lohkemper
8	MF	AUT	Nikola Dovedan
9	FW	SWE	Mikael Ishak
10	MF	GER	Sebastian Kerk
11	FW	SVK	Adam Zreľák
14	FW	SUI	Michael Frey (on loan from Fenerbahçe)
15	DF	GER	Fabian Nürnberger
16	MF	SVN	Adam Gnezda Čerin
17	MF	GER	Robin Hack

No.	Pos.	Nation	Player
18	MF	GER	Hanno Behrens (captain)
19	DF	GER	Philip Heise (on loan from Norwich City)
21	GK	GER	Felix Dornebusch
22	DF	GER	Enrico Valentini
23	FW	GER	Fabian Schleusener
24	FW	NED	Virgil Misidjan
25	DF	GER	Oliver Sorg
26	GK	GER	Christian Mathenia
28	DF	GER	Lukas Mühl
29	MF	GER	Patrick Erras
30	GK	AUT	Andreas Lukse
33	DF	AUT	Georg Margreitter (vice-captain)
40	MF	POR	Iuri Medeiros

== Review and events ==
In 2019–20 the club plays in the 2. Bundesliga.

The club also took part in the 2019–20 edition of the DFB-Pokal, the German Cup.

== Friendly matches ==
22 June 2019	1. FC Lichtenfels	0–8	1. FC Nürnberg	Lichtenfels
18:00 CEST (UTC+2)		Report	Hack 12'; Fuchs 15'; Palacios 23', 28'; Knöll 34'; 41' (o.g.); Kerk 54'; Behrens 80'	Stadium: Karl-Fleschutz-Stadion; Attendance: 3,478

26 June 2019	DJK Ammerthal	0–6	1. FC Nürnberg	Ammerthal
18:00 CEST (UTC+2)		Report	Lohkemper 13', 21', 30'; Behrens 51'; Knöll 59', 63'	Stadium: Sportgelände Pürschläger Weg; Attendance: 1,000

29 June 2019	SpVgg Bayreuth	2–1	1. FC Nürnberg	Bayreuth
18:00 CEST (UTC+2)	Wolf 32'; Kopp 72'	Report	Knöll 33'	Stadium: Hans-Walter-Wild-Stadion; Attendance: 3,521; Referee: Patrick Hanslbauer

3 July 2019	FC Basel	4–0	1. FC Nürnberg	Allershausen
17:30 CEST (UTC+2)	Riveros 53'; Widmer 64'; Pululu 74', 76'	Report		Stadium: Stadion am Amperknie; Attendance: 600; Referee: Michael Bacher

9 July 2019	FC Pinzgau Saalfelden	0–2	1. FC Nürnberg	Saalfelden, Austria
18:00 CEST (UTC+2)		Report	Kerk 34'; Ishak 80'	Stadium: SaalfeldenArena; Attendance: 530

10 July 2019	SK Bischofshofen	0–3	1. FC Nürnberg	Bischofshofen, Austria
18:30 CEST (UTC+2)		Report	Knöll 25'; Jäger 79', 85'	Stadium: Sportgelände SK; Attendance: 330

14 July 2019	SK Rapid Wien	2–1	1. FC Nürnberg	Vienna, Austria
18:45 CEST (UTC+2)	Murg 36'; Knasmüllner 80'	Report	Barać 15' (o.g.)	Stadium: Allianz Stadion; Attendance: 12,600

20 July 2019	1. FC Nürnberg	1–1	Paris St. Germain	Nuremberg
18:30 CEST (UTC+2)	Valentini 71' (pen.)	Report	Sarabia 43'	Stadium: Max-Morlock-Stadion; Attendance: 30,252

5 September 2019	SpVgg Landshut	0–14	1. FC Nürnberg	Landshut
18:30 CEST (UTC+2)		Report	Dovedan 17', 40'; Behrens 24', 26'; Geis 41'; Lohkemper 45', 48', 52', 57', 67'; Frey 64'; Valentini 69', 81'; Kerk 74'	Stadium: Hammerbachstadion; Attendance: 1,085; Referee: Thomas Berg

9 October 2019	1. FC Nürnberg	2–3	FC Ingolstadt 04	Nuremberg
13:00 CEST (UTC+2)	Kerk 14'; Besong 53'	Report	Kaya 23'; Kutschke 33'; Beister 72'	Stadium: Max-Morlock-Stadion; Attendance: 0

11 January 2020	1. FC Nürnberg	5–2	FC Bayern Munich	Nuremberg
15:30 CET (UTC+1)	Frey 22'; Ishak 46'; Zreľák 58'; Schleusener 61'; Hack 77'	Report	Davies 35'; Tillman 85'	Stadium: Max-Morlock-Stadion; Attendance: 27,409; Referee: Asmir Osmanagic

17 January 2020	NK Osijek	2–0	1. FC Nürnberg	Marbella, Spain
16:00 CET (UTC+1)	Ndockyt 55'; Špoljarić 62' (pen.)	Report		Stadium: Dama de Noche; Attendance: 300

21 January 2020	CSKA Sofia	0–5	1. FC Nürnberg	Marbella, Spain
16:00 CET (UTC+1)		Report	Lohkemper 29', 33'; Carey 66' (o.g.); Frey 72'; Geis 90' (pen.)	Stadium: Football Center; Attendance: 350

== Competitions ==
Win Draw Loss

=== 2. Bundesliga ===
==== League table ====
Pos	Team	Pld	W	D	L	GF	GA	GD	Pts	Promotion, qualification or relegation
14	FC St. Pauli	34	9	12	13	41	50	−9	39	
15	Karlsruher SC	34	8	13	13	45	56	−11	37	
16	1. FC Nürnberg (O)	34	8	13	13	45	58	−13	37	Qualification for relegation play-offs
17	Wehen Wiesbaden (R)	34	9	7	18	45	65	−20	34	Relegation to 3. Liga
18	Dynamo Dresden (R)	34	8	8	18	32	58	−26	32	Relegation to 3. Liga

Source: DFB
Rules for classification: 1) Points; 2) Goal difference; 3) Goals scored; 4) Head-to-head points; 5) Head-to-head goal difference; 6) Head-to-head away goals scored; 7) Away goals scored; 8) Play-off.
(O) Play-off winners; (R) Relegated

==== Matches ====
27 July 2019 1	Dynamo Dresden	0–1	1. FC Nürnberg	Dresden
13:00 CEST (UTC+02)		Report	Dovedan 53'	Stadium: Rudolf-Harbig-Stadion; Attendance: 29,753; Referee: Felix Zwayer; Man of the Match: Mathenia

5 August 2019 2	1. FC Nürnberg	0–4	Hamburger SV	Nuremberg
20:30 CEST (UTC+02)		Report	Dudziak 12'; Kittel 30'; Narey 72'; Handwerker 81' (ogg.)	Stadium: Max-Morlock-Stadion; Attendance: 44,497; Referee: Harm Osmers; Man of the Match: Fein

16 August 2019 3	SV Sandhausen	3–2	1. FC Nürnberg	Sandhausen
18:30 CEST (UTC+02)	Engels 25'; Behrens 35'; Türpitz 89'	Report	Kerk 45'; Sørensen 70'	Stadium: BWT-Stadion am Hardtwald; Attendance: 7,542; Referee: Robert Kampka; Man of the Match: Türpitz

25 August 2019 4	1. FC Nürnberg	1–0	VfL Osnabrück	Nuremberg
13:30 CEST (UTC+02)	Geis 80'	Report		Stadium: Max-Morlock-Stadion; Attendance: 27,083; Referee: Sven Waschitzki; Man of the Match: Geis

30 August 2019 5	1. FC Nürnberg	2–2	1. FC Heidenheim	Nuremberg
18:30 CEST (UTC+02)	Dovedan 30'; Geis 70'	Report	Dorsch 82'; Schimmer 84'	Stadium: Max-Morlock-Stadion; Attendance: 27,444; Referee: Florian Heft; Man of the Match: Dorsch

15 September 2019 6	SV Darmstadt 98	3–3	1. FC Nürnberg	Darmstadt
13:30 CEST (UTC+02)	Dursun 6', 82'; Đumić 72'	Report	Hack 9', 85'; Frey 45'	Stadium: Stadion am Böllenfalltor; Attendance: 15,200; Referee: Alexander Sather; Man of the Match: Dursun

21 September 2019 7	1. FC Nürnberg	1–1	Karlsruher SC	Nuremberg
13:00 CEST (UTC+02)	Geis 24', pen.'	Report	Stiefler 40'	Stadium: Max-Morlock-Stadion; Attendance: 30,332; Referee: Marco Fritz; Man of the Match: Stiefler

30 September 2019 8	Hannover 96	0–4	1. FC Nürnberg	Hannover
20:30 CEST (UTC+02)		Report	Margreitter 3', 83'; Behrens 26'; Hack 45'	Stadium: HDI Arena; Attendance: 26,800; Referee: Martin Petersen; Man of the Match: Margreitter

6 October 2019 9	1. FC Nürnberg	1–1	FC St. Pauli	Nuremberg
13:30 CEST (UTC+02)	Behrens 51'	Report	Gyökeres 23'	Stadium: Max-Morlock-Stadion; Attendance: 32,117; Referee: Lasse Koslowski; Man of the Match: Himmelmann

18 October 2019 10	FC Erzgebirge Aue	4–3	1. FC Nürnberg	Aue
18:30 CEST (UTC+02)	Nazarov 62', pen.' Hochscheidt 75'; Mihojević 86'; Krüger 90'	Report	Frey 51'; Geis 78', pen.', 90'	Stadium: Erzgebirgsstadion; Attendance: 14,000; Referee: Daniel Schlager; Man of the Match: Männel

27 October 2019 11	1. FC Nürnberg	1–1	SSV Jahn Regensburg	Nuremberg
13:30 CET (UTC+01)	Behrens 38'	Report	Schneider 90'	Stadium: Max-Morlock-Stadion; Attendance: 34,365; Referee: Patrick Alt; Man of the Match: Valentini

4 November 2019 12	VfL Bochum	3–1	1. FC Nürnberg	Bochum
20:30 CET (UTC+01)	Danilo 9'; Lorenz 40'; Wintzheimer 45'	Report	Sørensen 63'	Stadium: Ruhrstadion; Attendance: 16,046; Referee: Matthias Jöllenbeck; Man of the Match: Danilo

10 November 2019 13	1. FC Nürnberg	1–5	Arminia Bielefeld	Nuremberg
13:30 CET (UTC+01)	Sørensen 59'	Report	Clauss 10'; Voglsammer 13'; Klos 15' (60); Yabo 73'	Stadium: Max-Morlock-Stadion; Attendance: 28,624; Referee: Patrick Ittrich; Man of the Match: Klos

24 November 2019 14	SpVgg Greuther Fürth	0–0	1. FC Nürnberg	Fürth
13:30 CET (UTC+01)		Report		Stadium: Sportpark Ronhof; Attendance: 15,000 (sell-out); Referee: Manuel Gräfe; Man of the Match: Dornebusch

30 November 2019 15	1. FC Nürnberg	0–2	SV Wehen Wiesbaden	Nuremberg
13:00 CET (UTC+01)		Report	Schäffler 4'; Kyereh 48'	Stadium: Max-Morlock-Stadion; Attendance: 28,167; Referee: Sascha Stegemann; Man of the Match: Schäffler

9 December 2019 16	VfB Stuttgart	3–1	1. FC Nürnberg	Stuttgart
20:30 CET (UTC+01)	Silas 58' (pen.); Gómez 59'; Förster 72'	Report	Frey 10'	Stadium: Mercedes-Benz Arena; Attendance: 48,971; Referee: Robert Schröder; Man of the Match: Gómez

15 December 2019 17	1. FC Nürnberg	2–2	Holstein Kiel	Nuremberg
13:30 CET (UTC+01)	Sørensen 38'; Hack 67'	Report	Serra 77'; Thesker 90'	Stadium: Max-Morlock-Stadion; Attendance: 25,275; Referee: Timo Gerach; Man of the Match: Hack

20 December 2019 18	1. FC Nürnberg	2–0	Dynamo Dresden	Nuremberg
18:30 CET (UTC+01)	Hack 33', 53'	Report		Stadium: Max-Morlock-Stadion; Attendance: 29,741; Referee: Matthias Jöllenbeck; Man of the Match: Hack

30 January 2020 19	Hamburger SV	4–1	1. FC Nürnberg	Hamburg
20:30 CET (UTC+01)	Jatta 17'; Hinterseer 28' (pen.); Kittel 67' (pen.); Jung 82'	Report	Handwerker 51'	Stadium: Volksparkstadion; Attendance: 39,985; Referee: Markus Schmidt; Man of the Match: Dudziak

2 February 2020 20	1. FC Nürnberg	2–0	SV Sandhausen	Nuremberg
13:30 CET (UTC+01)	Frey 12'; Hack 52'	Report		Stadium: Max-Morlock-Stadion; Attendance: 25,094; Referee: Martin Thomsen; Man of the Match: Mavropanos

8 February 2020 21	VfL Osnabrück	0–1	1. FC Nürnberg	Osnabrück
13:00 CET (UTC+01)		Report	Behrens 60'	Stadium: Stadion an der Bremer Brücke; Attendance: 15,313; Referee: Tobias Reichel; Man of the Match: Hack

14 February 2020 22	1. FC Heidenheim	2–2	1. FC Nürnberg	Heidenheim
18:30 CET (UTC+01)	Kleindienst 45', 83'	Report	Dovedan 1'; Behrens 62'	Stadium: Voith-Arena; Attendance: 13,600; Referee: Timo Gerach; Man of the Match: Kleindienst

23 February 2020 23	1. FC Nürnberg	1–2	SV Darmstadt 98	Nuremberg
13:30 CET (UTC+01)	Dovedan 30'	Report	Kempe 55' (pen.); Đumić 89'	Stadium: Max-Morlock-Stadion; Attendance: 25,549; Referee: Patrick Alt; Man of the Match: Đumić

28 February 2020 24	Karlsruher SC	0–1	1. FC Nürnberg	Karlsruhe
18:30 CET (UTC+01)		Report	Erras 74'	Stadium: Wildparkstadion; Attendance: 14,450; Referee: Christof Günsch; Man of the Match: Geis

6 March 2020 25	1. FC Nürnberg	0–3	Hannover 96	Nuremberg
18:30 CET (UTC+01)		Report	Hübers 18'; Maina 27'; Weydandt 90'	Stadium: Max-Morlock-Stadion; Attendance: 26,745; Referee: Markus Schmidt; Man of the Match: Maina

17 May 2020 26	FC St. Pauli	1–0	1. FC Nürnberg	Hamburg
13:30 CEST (UTC+02)	Gyökeres 84'	Report		Stadium: Millerntor-Stadion; Attendance: 0 Referee: Daniel Siebert; Man of the Match: Mavropanos

22 May 2020 27	1. FC Nürnberg	1–1	FC Erzgebirge Aue	Nuremberg
18:30 CEST (UTC+02)	Gonther 63' (ogg.)	Report	Nazarov 51'	Stadium: Max-Morlock-Stadion; Attendance: 0 Referee: Felix Brych; Man of the Match: Männel

26 May 2020 28	SSV Jahn Regensburg	2–2	1. FC Nürnberg	Regensburg
18:30 CEST (UTC+02)	Albers 44'; Stolze 48'	Report	Ishak 11'; Knipping 90' (ogg.)	Stadium: Arena Regensburg; Attendance: 0 Referee: Michael Bacher; Man of the Match: Ishak

30 May 2020 29	1. FC Nürnberg	0–0	VfL Bochum	Nuremberg
13:00 CEST (UTC+02)		Report		Stadium: Max-Morlock-Stadion; Attendance: 0 Referee: Alexander Sather; Man of the Match: Losilla

6 June 2020 30	Arminia Bielefeld	1–1	1. FC Nürnberg	Bielefeld
13:00 CEST (UTC+02)	Klos 14'	Report	Erras 43'	Stadium: Schüco Arena; Attendance: 0 Referee: René Rohde; Man of the Match: Ortega

13 June 2020 31	1. FC Nürnberg	0–1	SpVgg Greuther Fürth	Nuremberg
13:00 CEST (UTC+02)		Report	Raum 56'	Stadium: Max-Morlock-Stadion; Attendance: 0 Referee: Tobias Reichel; Man of the Match: Mavraj

16 June 2020 32	SV Wehen Wiesbaden	0–6	1. FC Nürnberg	Wiesbaden
18:30 CEST (UTC+02)		Report	Hack 7', 41', 65'; Sørensen 38', 58'; Zreľák 83'	Stadium: Brita-Arena; Attendance: 0 Referee: Daniel Schlager; Man of the Match: Hack

21 June 2020 33	1. FC Nürnberg	0–6	VfB Stuttgart	Nuremberg
15:30 CEST (UTC+02)		Report	Silas 11'; Karazor 26', 63'; Kalajdžić 41'; González 52', 76'	Stadium: Max-Morlock-Stadion; Attendance: 0 Referee: Matthias Jöllenbeck; Man of the Match: González

28 June 2020 34	Holstein Kiel	1–1	1. FC Nürnberg	Kiel
15:30 CEST (UTC+02)	Lauberbach 67'	Report	Erras 3'	Stadium: Holstein-Stadion; Attendance: 0 Referee: Sven Jablonski; Man of the Match: Meffert

==== Relegation play-offs ====
7 July 2020 First leg	1. FC Nürnberg	2–0	FC Ingolstadt 04	Nuremberg
18:15 CEST (UTC+02:00)	Nürnberger 22', 45'	Report		Stadium: Max-Morlock-Stadion; Attendance: 0 Referee: Sascha Stegemann; Man of the Match: Nürnberger

11 July 2020 Second leg	FC Ingolstadt 04	3–1 (3–3 agg.)	1. FC Nürnberg	Ingolstadt
18:15 CEST (UTC+02:00)	Kutschke 53'; Schröck 62'; Krauße 66'	Report	Schleusener 90+6'	Stadium: Audi Arena; Attendance: 0 Referee: Christian Dingert; Man of the Match: Schleusener

=== DFB-Pokal ===
9 August 2019 First round	FC Ingolstadt 04	0–1	1. FC Nürnberg	Ingolstadt
20:45		Report	Dovedan 87'	Stadium: Audi Sportpark; Attendance: 14,348; Referee: Daniel Siebert

30 October 2019 Second round	1. FC Kaiserslautern	2–2 (a.e.t.) (6–5 p)	1. FC Nürnberg	Kaiserslautern
18:30	Thiele 8', pen.', 74', pen.'	Report	Jäger 15'; Frey 89'	Stadium: Fritz-Walter-Stadion; Attendance: 21,714; Referee: Guido Winkmann; Man of the Match: Thiele
	Penalties
	Kraus (penalty scored); Röser (penalty scored); Starke (penalty scored); Kühlwetter (penalty scored); Hemlein (penalty scored); Bjarnason (penalty scored)		(penalty scored) Geis; (penalty scored) Hack; (penalty scored) Dovedan; (penalty scored) Frey; (penalty scored) Sørensen; (penalty missed) } Handwerker

== Overall ==
Matches played	34
Matches won	8
Matches drawn	13
Matches lost	13
Goals scored	45
Goals conceded	58
Goal difference	-13
Clean sheets	10
Yellow cards	
Red cards	5
Best result(s)	6–0 vs Wehen Wiesbaden
Worst result(s)	0-6 vs Stuttgart
Points earned	37/102
