= Pol García =

Spanish footballer (born 1995)

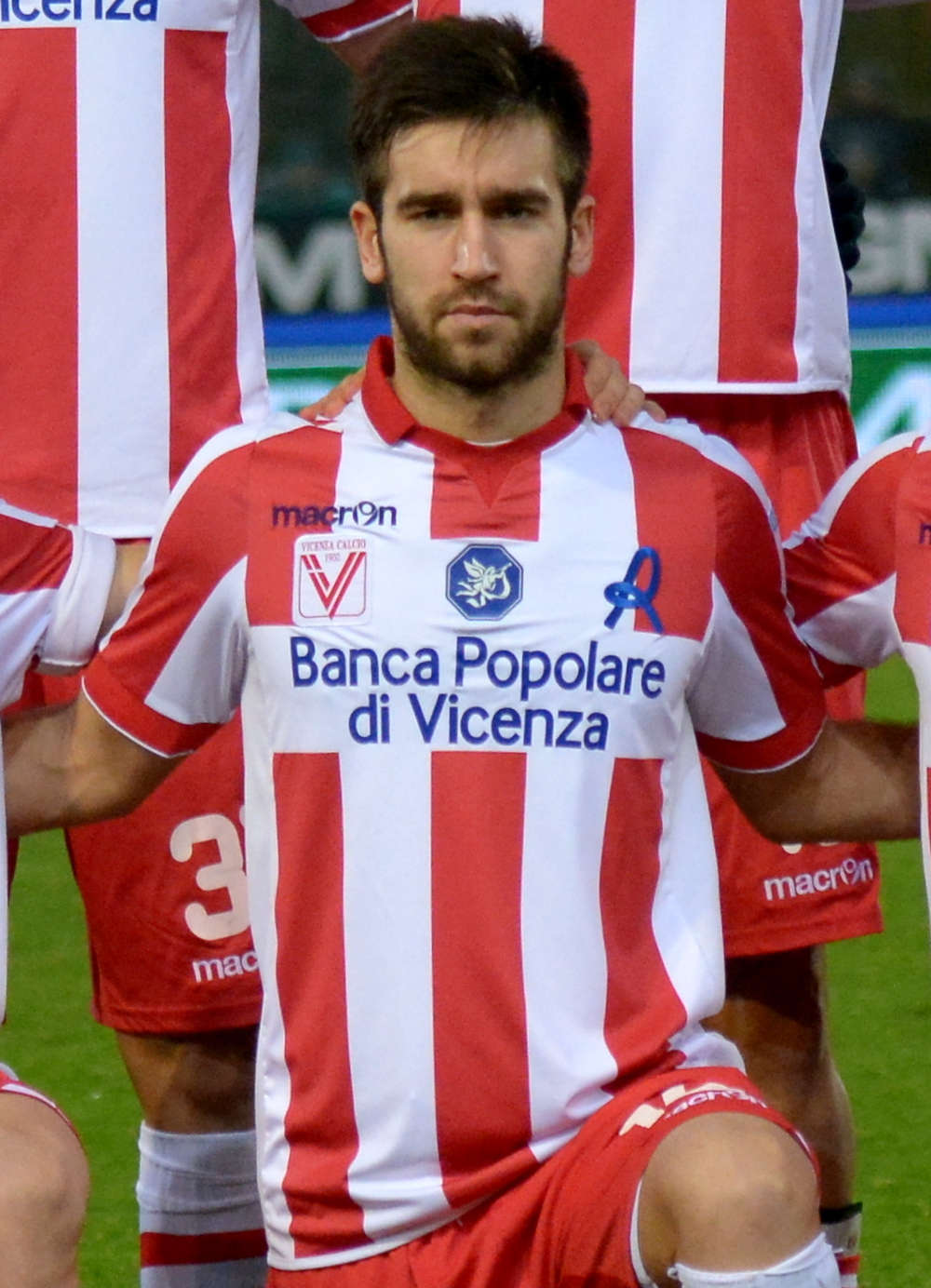

Personal information
- Full name: Pol García Tena
- Date of birth: 18 February 1995 (age 31)
- Place of birth: Terrassa, Spain
- Height: 1.85 m (6 ft 1 in)
- Position: Defender

Youth career
- 2009–2010: Espanyol
- 2010–2011: Barcelona
- 2011–2014: Juventus

Senior career*
Years	Team	Apps	(Gls)
2014–2018	Juventus	0	(0)
2014–2015	→ Vicenza (loan)	23	(1)
2015	→ Como (loan)	13	(0)
2016	→ Crotone (loan)	12	(1)
2016–2017	→ Latina (loan)	32	(1)
2017–2018	→ Cremonese (loan)	15	(0)
2018–2020	Sint-Truiden	61	(3)
2021	Juárez	17	(1)
2022	Lugo	2	(0)
2022–2024	Trento	41	(1)
2024–2025	Panachaiki	10	(0)

International career
2011	Spain U17	1	(0)
- * Club domestic league appearances and goals as of 5 July 2025

Pol García Tena (born 18 February 1995) is a Spanish professional footballer who plays as a left-back or a centre-back.

== Career ==
Born in Terrassa, Barcelona, Catalonia, García played for the youth teams of RCD Espanyol and FC Barcelona between 2009 and 2011 before being released by the latter. It was reported that he was close on joining Juventus. While asked about the reason for joining the Italian club he said "It's always a great experience"

On 19 January 2013, García was named in a matchday squad for the first time, remaining an unused substitute in Juventus' 4–0 Serie A home win over Udinese. Three days later he was included for the only other time that season, again unused in a 1–1 home draw against Lazio in the Coppa Italia semi-final first leg.

On 2 September 2014, he was loaned out to Serie B club Vicenza. He made his debut five days later in a 2–1 away defeat against Trapani, playing the final 21 minutes in place of Oualid El Hasni. He scored his first career goal on 25 October, an added-time consolation in a 1–3 loss at Catania. He spent the following years on loan at Como, Crotone, Latina and Cremonese - all in the same tier.

On 11 July 2018, García joined Belgian club Sint-Truiden on a two-year deal. On 31 January 2021, he moved to Mexican club FC Juárez, and made his debut against Mazatlán.

On 22 March 2022, García signed with CD Lugo until the end of the 2021–22 season.

On 24 August 2022, García moved to Trento in Italian Serie C on a two-year deal.

On 19 September 2024, García moved to Panachaiki F.C. in Super League Greece 2 on a one-year deal.

== Personal life ==
His brother Jesús is also a footballer.

== Career statistics ==
As of match played 28 January 2024

Appearances and goals by club, season and competition
Club	Season	League			National cup (Note: Includes Coppa Italia, Belgian Cup)		Other		Total	
Club	Season	Division	Apps	Goals	Apps	Goals	Apps	Goals	Apps	Goals
Vicenza (loan)	2014–15	Serie B	23	1	0	0	—		23	1
Como 1907 (loan)	2015–16	Serie B	13	0	1	0	—		14	0
Crotone (loan)	2015–16	Serie B	12	1	—		—		12	1
Latina (loan)	2016–17	Serie B	32	1	2	0	—		34	1
Cremonese (loan)	2017–18	Serie B	15	0	0	0	—		15	0
Sint-Truiden	2018–19	Belgian Pro League	22	1	2	0	2 (Note: Appearances in Belgian Pro League Europa League play-offs)	0	26	1
Sint-Truiden	2019–20	Belgian Pro League	21	1	2	0	—		23	1
Sint-Truiden	2020–21	Belgian Pro League	16	1	0	0	–		16	1
Sint-Truiden	Total		59	3	4	0	2	0	63	3
Lugo	2021–22	Segunda División	2	0	–		–		2	0
Trento	2022–23	Serie C	28	1	–		–		28	1
Trento	2023–24	Serie C	12	0	–		–		12	0
Trento	Total		40	1	0	0	0	0	40	1
Panachaiki F.C.	2024–25	Super League Greece 2	0	0	0	0	0	0	0	0
Career total			196	7	7	0	2	0	205	7
