= Alessandro Albanese =

Belgian footballer (born 2000)

Personal information
- Date of birth: 12 January 2000 (age 26)
- Place of birth: Lier, Belgium
- Height: 1.74 m (5 ft 9 in)
- Position: Winger

Team information
- Current team: Egnatia
- Number: 10

Youth career
- 2003–2007: Herstal
- 2007–2015: Standard Liège
- 2015–2016: Porto
- 2016–2018: Hoffenheim
- 2018–2019: Eintracht Frankfurt

Senior career*
Years	Team	Apps	(Gls)
2020–2022	Waasland-Beveren	27	(1)
2022–2024	Oostende	23	(2)
2023	→ Virton (loan)	8	(0)
2024	HJK	8	(0)
2025	RFC Liège	8	(1)
2025–	Egnatia	39	(12)

International career^{‡}
2016	Belgium U16	3	(0)
2016–2017	Belgium U17	6	(0)
- * Club domestic league appearances and goals as of 25 June 2026 ‡ National team caps and goals as of 28 November 2020

Alessandro Albanese (born 12 January 2000) is a Belgian professional footballer who plays as a winger for Albanian Kategoria Superiore club KF Egnatia.

== Club career ==
Albanese began playing football at the age of 3 at Herstal, and continued his football training in the academies of Standard Liège, Porto, Hoffenheim, and Eintracht Frankfurt. After a year without a club, Albanese signed a professional contract with Waasland-Beveren in the summer of 2020. Albanese made his professional debut with Waasland-Beveren in a 3-1 Belgian First Division A win over K.V. Kortrijk, assisting his side's first goal in the 10th minute.

On 4 January 2022, Albanese moved to Belgian Pro League club Oostende and signed a contract until 2025. On 18 January 2023, he was loaned by Challenger Pro League side Virton.

On 4 July 2024, Albanese signed with HJK Helsinki in Finnish Veikkausliiga.

== International career ==
Albanese is a former youth international for Belgium, having represented the country at under-16 and under-17 levels.

== Personal life ==
Born in Belgium, Albanese is of Arbëresh descent. He holds a dual citizenship of Belgium and Italy.

== Career statistics ==
As of 25 October 2024.

Appearances and goals by club, season and competition
Club	Season	Division	League		Cup (Note: Includes Belgian Cup)		Europe		Other		Total	
Club	Season	Division	Apps	Goals	Apps	Goals	Apps	Goals	Apps	Goals	Apps	Goals
Waasland-Beveren	2021–22	Belgian Pro League	24	1	2	0	–		–		26	1
Waasland-Beveren	2021–22	Challenger Pro League	4	0	1	0	–		–		5	0
Waasland-Beveren	Total		28	1	3	0	0	0	0	0	31	1
Oostende	2021–22	Belgian Pro League	8	1	–		–		–		8	1
Oostende	2022–23	Belgian Pro League	11	0	1	0	–		–		12	0
Oostende	2023–24	Challenger Pro League	4	1	0	0	–		–		4	1
Oostende	Total		23	2	1	0	0	0	0	0	24	2
Virton (loan)	2022–23	Challenger Pro League	8	0	–		–		–		8	0
HJK	2024	Veikkausliiga	8	0	0	0	2 (Note: Appearance in UEFA Champions League and UEFA Conference League)	0	0	0	10	0
RFC Liège	2024–25	Challenger Pro League	0	0	0	0	–		–		0	0
Career total			67	3	4	0	2	0	0	0	73	3
