= Jur Schryvers =

Belgian footballer

Personal information
- Full name: Jur Schryvers
- Date of birth: 11 March 1997 (age 29)
- Place of birth: Belgium
- Height: 1.81 m (5 ft 11 in)
- Position: Right-back

Team information
- Current team: Cappellen
- Number: 20

Youth career
- 2011–2013: Beerschot AC
- 2003–2017: Club Brugge

Senior career*
Years	Team	Apps	(Gls)
2017–2022	Waasland-Beveren	123	(3)
2022–2024	Deinze	27	(2)
2024–2025	Merelbeke	16	(1)
2025–	Cappellen	0	(0)

International career
2012	Belgium U15	1	(1)
2012	Belgium U16	1	(0)
2014	Belgium U17	3	(0)
2014–2015	Belgium U18	5	(0)
2015	Belgium U19	2	(0)
2018–2019	Belgium U21	6	(0)
- * Club domestic league appearances and goals as of 25 January 2026

Jur Schryvers (born 11 March 1997) is a Belgian footballer who plays as a right back for Cappellen.
