= Michael Frey (footballer) =

Swiss footballer (born 1994)

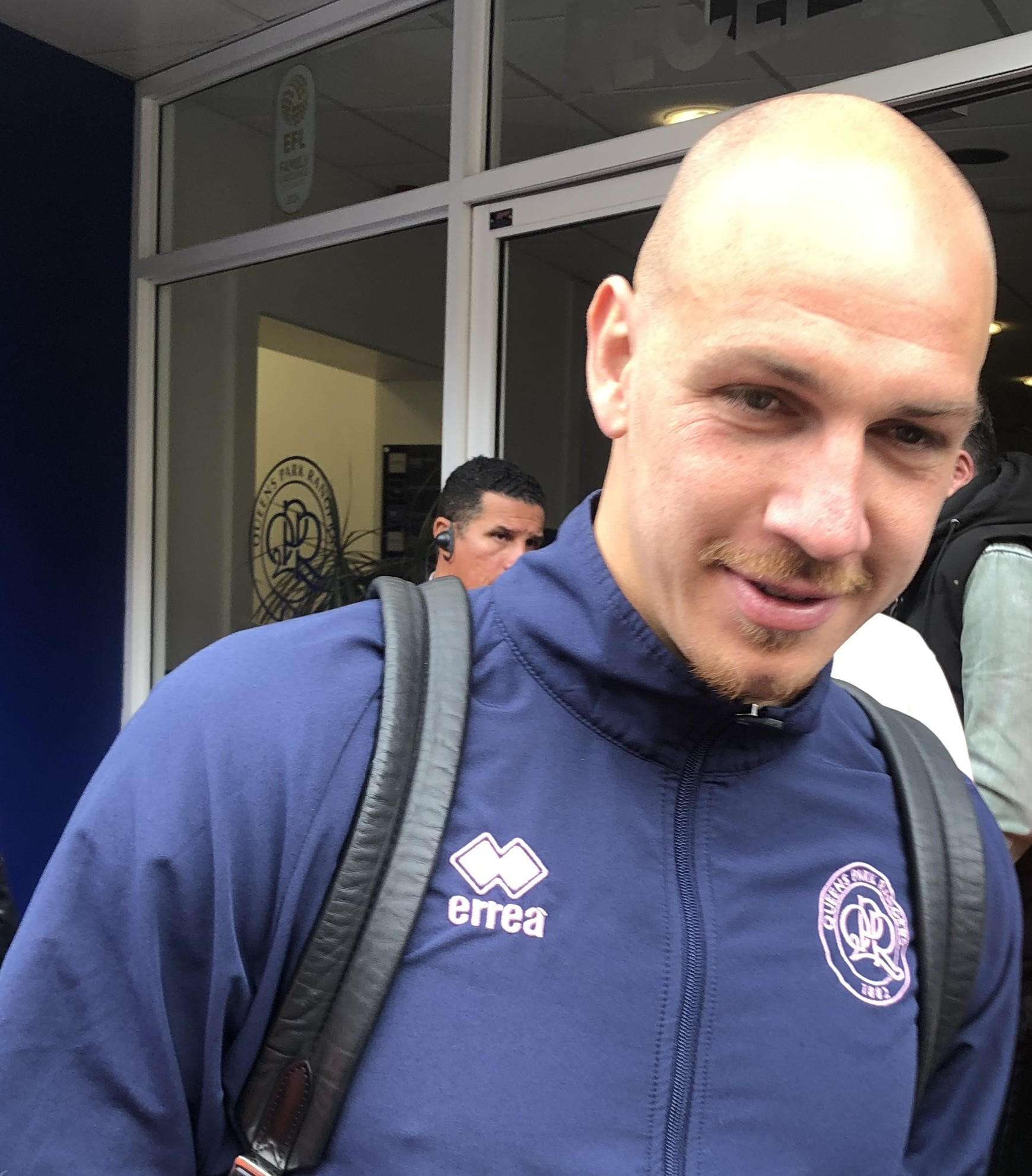
- Frey in 2025

Personal information
- Date of birth: 19 July 1994 (age 32)
- Place of birth: Münsingen, Switzerland
- Height: 1.88 m (6 ft 2 in)
- Position: Forward

Team information
- Current team: Royal Antwerp F.C.
- Number: 9

Youth career
- 2000–2006: FC Münsingen
- 2006–2010: Thun
- 2010–2012: Young Boys

Senior career*
Years	Team	Apps	(Gls)
2012–2014	Young Boys	73	(17)
2014–2016	Lille	15	(2)
2016	→ Luzern (loan)	16	(4)
2016–2017	Young Boys	29	(8)
2017–2018	FC Zürich	34	(12)
2018–2021	Fenerbahçe	15	(3)
2019–2020	→ 1. FC Nürnberg (loan)	29	(4)
2020–2021	→ Beveren (loan)	27	(12)
2021–2024	Royal Antwerp	53	(31)
2023	→ Schalke 04 (loan)	15	(0)
2024–2026	Queens Park Rangers	51	(9)
2026–2026	Grasshopper	12	(1)
2026–	Royal Antwerp	6	(4)

International career
2010–2011	Switzerland U17	4	(0)
2011–2013	Switzerland U19	12	(4)
2014	Switzerland U20	1	(1)
2013–2016	Switzerland U21	14	(2)
- * Club domestic league appearances and goals as of 17 May 2026

Michael Frey (born 19 July 1994) is a Swiss professional footballer who plays as a forward for Jupiler Pro League side Royal Antwerp FC.

== Club career ==
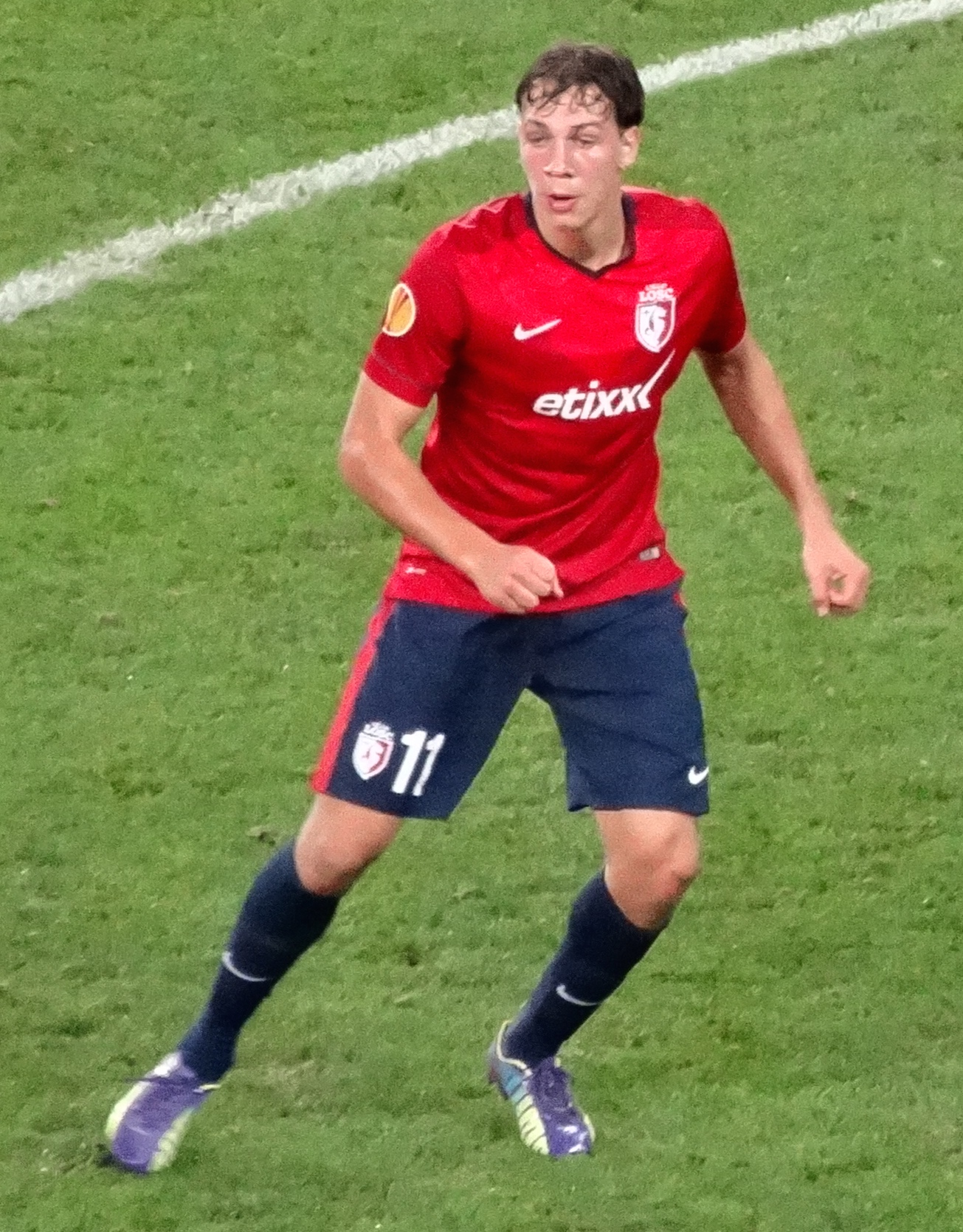
Frey playing for Lille in 2014.

A youth product of Young Boys, he scored 37 goals for the Bernese side in two stints at the club.

In June 2017, Frey signed a four-year contract with FC Zürich. In his only year at Zurich, he scored 16 goals and lifted the Swiss Cup.

In August 2018, Frey joined Turkish club Fenerbahçe for a reported transfer fee of €2.64 million. He signed a four-year deal. After his first season in Turkey, Frey joined 2. Bundesliga side 1. FC Nürnberg on loan for the 2019–20 season. The club retained an option to make the move permanent.

On 17 June 2021, Fenerbahçe announced that Frey had joined Antwerp on a permanent deal after an impressive loan spell with Beveren in the Belgian First Division A during the 2020–21 season. On 8 August 2021, Frey scored all five goals for Antwerp in their 5–2 league win over Standard Liège.

On 20 January 2023, after two and a half seasons in Belgium, he was loaned to the German side Schalke 04, newly promoted to the Bundesliga, with an option to make the deal permanent.

=== Queens Park Rangers ===
On 28 January 2024, Frey signed for English club Queens Park Rangers. Frey scored his first goal for QPR in a 2–2 draw with Norwich City on 10 February 2024.

Frey opened his account in the 2024–25 season with a goal in a 2–1 defeat of Cambridge United in the first round of the EFL Cup on 13 August. The victory earned QPR their first win in the competition for three years. He then scored his first league goal of the season in a 1–1 draw with Plymouth Argyle on 24 August. Six days later, he scored the winner in a come-from-behind 2–1 win over Luton Town in the league.

On 18th September 2025, he became the 1,187th player to play for Queens Park Rangers with his debut on 03/02/2024.

=== Return to Switzerland ===
On 26 January 2026, he signed with Swiss record champions Grasshopper Club Zurich on a two-year contract. A week later, on 31 January, he was nominated to the starting lineup in a 1–1 draw at home against FC Lugano. On 3 February, he started again in the mid-week Swiss Cup quarter-final tie against FC Sion and scored a stoppage time goal to equalize the match at 3–3. Grasshoppers would go on to win the game 4–3 in extra time, with Frey playing the full 120 minutes, and securing their place in the semi-final. He also supplied the assist for the 1–2 in the 76th minute of the game. On 11 April 2026, he scored his first goal in the Swiss Super League since 2018, with a long strike from his own half in the eleventh minute of stoppage time away against FC Winterthur for the final score of 0–2. Earlier he missed a penalty in the 91st minute of the game. He departed GC Zurich after just half a season on 18 June 2026 by mutual consent.

=== Return to Antwerp ===
On 30 July 2026, he returned to Belgium, rejoining his former club Royal Antwerp on a two-year contract.

== Style of play ==
Described as a "high energy," "decisive" and "burly" striker, Frey's height, speed and strength make him a classic number 9, with the ability to hold the ball up and take on defenders, allied to precision and power in front of goal.

== Career statistics ==
As of 31 May 2026

Appearances and goals by club, season and competition
Club	Season	League			National cup (Note: Includes Swiss Cup, Coupe de France, Turkish Cup, DFB-Pokal, Belgian Cup, FA Cup)		League cup (Note: Includes Coupe de la Ligue, EFL Cup)		Europe		Other		Total	
Club	Season	Division	Apps	Goals	Apps	Goals	Apps	Goals	Apps	Goals	Apps	Goals	Apps	Goals
Young Boys	2011–12	Swiss Super League	2	1	0	0	—		—		—		2	1
Young Boys	2012–13	Swiss Super League	31	4	2	4	—		10 (Note: Appearances in UEFA Europa League)	1	—		43	9
Young Boys	2013–14	Swiss Super League	33	9	2	0	—		—		—		35	9
Young Boys	2014–15	Swiss Super League	7	3	0	0	—		4	2	—		11	5
Young Boys	Total		73	17	4	4	—		14	3	—		91	24
Lille	2014–15	Ligue 1	15	2	1	0	2	1	3	0	—		21	3
Luzern (loan)	2015–16	Swiss Super League	16	4	1	0	—		—		—		17	4
Young Boys	2016–17	Swiss Super League	29	8	4	4	—		8 (Note: Two appearances in UEFA Champions League, six appearances and one goal in UEFA Europa League)	1	—		41	13
FC Zürich	2017–18	Swiss Super League	31	12	5	4	—		—		—		36	16
FC Zürich	2018–19	Swiss Super League	3	0	0	0	—		—		—		3	0
FC Zürich	Total		34	12	5	4	—		—		—		39	16
Fenerbahçe	2018–19	Süper Lig	14	3	3	0	—		5	2	—		22	5
Fenerbahçe	2020–21	Süper Lig	1	0	0	0	—		—		—		1	0
Fenerbahçe	Total		15	3	3	0	—		5	2	—		23	5
1. FC Nürnberg (loan)	2019–20	2. Bundesliga	29	4	1	1	—		—		2 (Note: Appearances in 2. Bundesliga relegation play-offs)	0	32	5
Beveren (loan)	2020–21	Belgian Pro League	27	12	2	3	—		—		2 (Note: Appearances in Belgian Pro League relegation play-offs)	2	31	17
Antwerp	2021–22	Belgian Pro League	39	24	1	0	—		6	0	—		46	24
Antwerp	2022–23	Belgian Pro League	14	7	3	1	—		6 (Note: Appearances in UEFA Europa Conference League)	2	—		23	10
Antwerp	Total		53	31	4	1	—		12	2	—		69	34
Schalke 04 (loan)	2022–23	Bundesliga	15	0	—		—		—		—		15	0
Queens Park Rangers	2023–24	Championship	9	1	—		—		—		—		9	1
Queens Park Rangers	2024–25	Championship	29	8	1	0	1	1	—		—		31	9
Queens Park Rangers	2025–26	Championship	13	0	0	0	0	0	—		—		13	0
Queens Park Rangers	Total		51	9	1	0	1	1	—		—		53	10
Grasshopper	2025–26	Swiss Super League	12	1	2	1	—		—		2 (Note: Two appearances in the relegation play-off.)	0	16	2
Antwerp	2026–27	Belgian Pro League	0	0	0	0	—		—		—		0	0
Career total			369	103	28	18	3	2	42	8	6	2	291	91

== Honours ==
FC Zürich

- Swiss Cup: 2017–18

Individual

- Swiss Super League Young Footballer of the Year: 2013–14
