= Dirk Geeraerd =

Belgian football manager (born 1963)

Personal information
- Date of birth: 2 December 1963 (age 62)
- Place of birth: Oudenaarde, Belgium
- Position: Defender

Senior career*
Years	Team	Apps	(Gls)
1973–1983	Oudenaarde		
1983–1985	DES Leupegem		
1985–1986	Sparta Wortegem		
1986–1987	KFC Nederename		

Managerial career
- 1988–1990: Oudenaarde (youth)
- 1990–1993: Gent-Zeehaven (assistant)
- 1993–2000: Eendracht Aalter (assistant)
- 2000–2001: Torhout 1992 KM
- 2001–2003: Deinze
- 2003–2005: Denderhoutem
- 2005–2006: Red Star Waasland
- 2006–2008: Roeselare
- 2009–2010: Ronse
- 2010–2012: Waasland-Beveren
- 2013: Ronse (sports advisor)
- 2013–2014: Berchem Sport
- 2015–2016: Eendracht Aalst
- 2017–2020: Waasland-Beveren (assistant)
- 2018: Waasland-Beveren (caretaker)
- 2019: Waasland-Beveren (caretaker)
- 2020: Waasland-Beveren (caretaker)
- * Club domestic league appearances and goals

Dirk Geeraerd (born 2 December 1963) is a Belgian football manager and former player.

== Career ==
Geeraerd was dismissed as Roeselare manager in October 2008.

In November 2012 he was sacked as a manager of Waasland-Beveren.
