= Dries Wuytens =

Belgian-Italian footballer

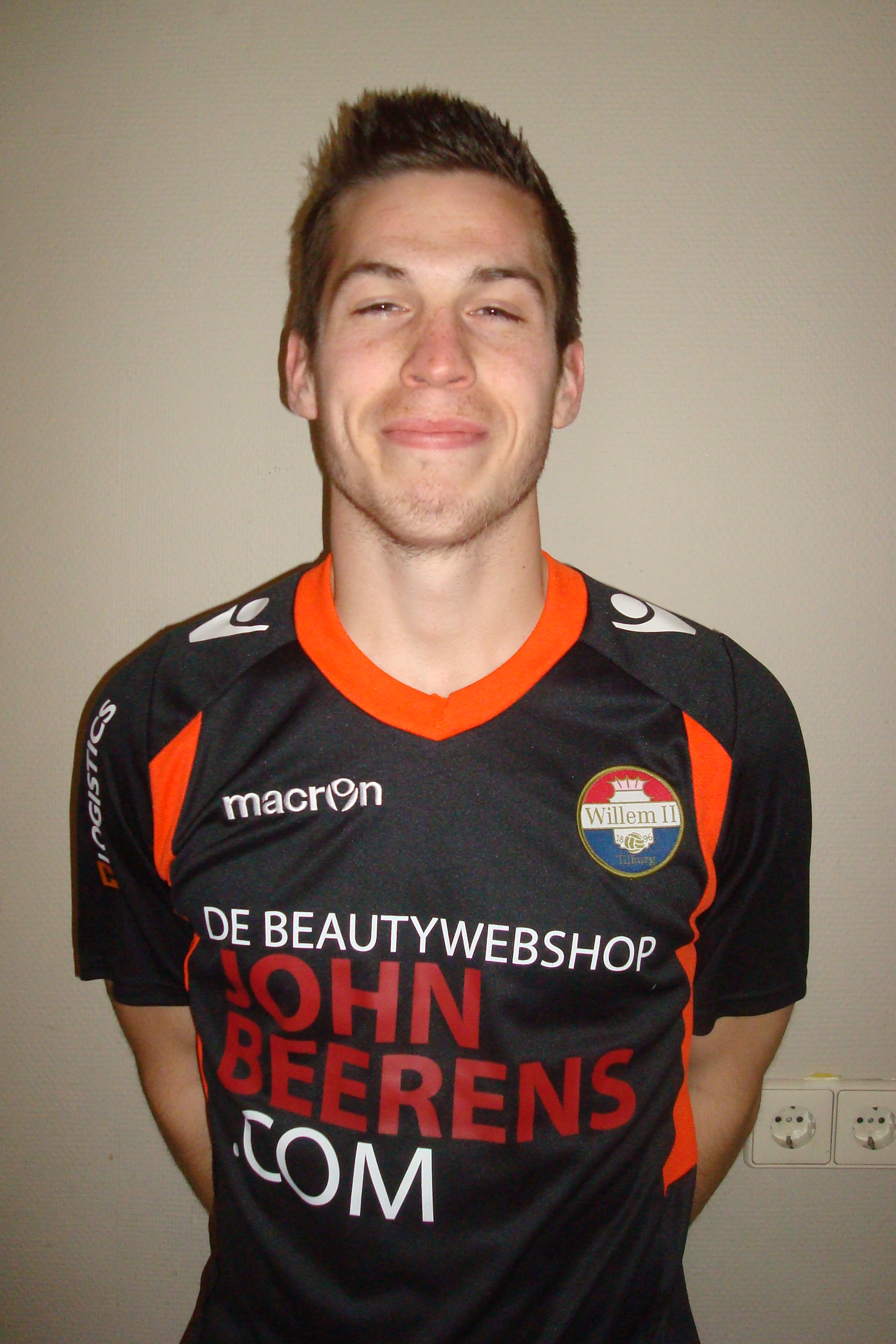

Personal information
- Date of birth: 18 March 1991 (age 35)
- Place of birth: Eksel, Belgium
- Height: 1.83 m (6 ft 0 in)
- Position: Centre back

Team information
- Current team: K Achel VV
- Number: 12

Youth career
- 2010–2011: PSV Eindhoven

Senior career*
Years	Team	Apps	(Gls)
2011–2013	Beerschot	23	(0)
2013–2017	Willem II	101	(8)
2017–2018	Heracles Almelo	18	(1)
2018–2019	Sparta Rotterdam	29	(1)
2019–2020	Sektzia Ness Ziona	28	(0)
2020–2025	Beveren	116	(3)
2025–	K Achel VV	0	(0)

International career
2009	Belgium U19	2	(0)
2010	Belgium U20	1	(0)
2010–2012	Belgium U21	9	(0)
- * Club domestic league appearances and goals as of 16 January 2026

Dries Wuytens (born 18 March 1991) is a Belgian professional footballer who plays as a centre-back for K Achel VV.

== Career statistics ==
As of match played 21 January 2018

Appearances and goals by club, season and competition
Club	Season	League			National Cup		Other		Total	
Club	Season	Division	Apps	Goals	Apps	Goals	Apps	Goals	Apps	Goals
Beerschot	2011–12	Pro League	22	0	2	0	0	0	24	0
Beerschot	2012–13	Pro League	1	0	0	0	0	0	1	0
Beerschot	Total		23	0	2	0	0	0	25	0
Willem II	2013–14	Eerste Divisie	34	3	0	0	0	0	34	3
Willem II	2014–15	Eredivisie	32	1	1	0	0	0	33	1
Willem II	2015–16	Eredivisie	33	4	3	0	3	0	39	4
Willem II	2016–17	Eredivisie	15	0	0	0	0	0	15	0
Willem II	Total		114	8	4	0	3	0	121	8
Heracles Almelo	2017–18	Eredivisie	9	1	2	0	0	0	11	1
Career total			146	9	8	0	3	0	157	9

== Honours ==
=== Club ===
Willem II

- Eerste Divisie (1): 2013–14
