= Nelson Balongo =

Congolese footballer (born 1999)

Personal information
- Full name: Nelson Felix Balongo Lissondja Vha
- Date of birth: 15 April 1999 (age 27)
- Place of birth: Tongeren, Belgium
- Height: 1.87 m (6 ft 2 in)
- Position: Forward

Team information
- Current team: Belisia Bilzen
- Number: 19

Youth career
- –2013: Standard Liège
- 2013–2017: Sint-Truiden
- 2017–2018: Boavista
- 2018–2019: Sint-Truiden

Senior career*
Years	Team	Apps	(Gls)
2019–2022	Sint-Truiden	24	(2)
2022–2023	ŁKS Łódź	23	(0)
2023	ŁKS Łódź II	16	(2)
2024	RFC Seraing	8	(0)
2025	Tienen	17	(6)
2026–	Belisia Bilzen	11	(2)

International career
2018	DR Congo U20	2	(0)
2019	DR Congo U23	2	(1)
- * Club domestic league appearances and goals as of 3 May 2026

Nelson Felix Balongo Lissondja Vha (born 15 April 1999) is a professional footballer who plays as a forward for Belgian club Belisia Bilzen. Born in Belgium, he represented the DR Congo at youth level.

== Club career ==
On 24 June 2022, it was announced he would join Polish I liga club ŁKS Łódź on a three-year deal. On 15 December 2023, his contract was terminated by mutual consent.

On 1 February 2024, Balongo joined Challenger Pro League side RFC Seraing.

== International career ==
Born in Belgium, Balongo is of Congolese descent. He has represented the DR Congo U20, and the DR Congo U23s.

== Honours ==
ŁKS Łódź

- I liga: 2022–23

ŁKS Łódź II

- III liga, group I: 2022–23
