= Chris Wolf =

German footballer (born 1991)

Personal information
- Date of birth: 23 February 1991 (age 35)
- Place of birth: Bayreuth, Germany
- Height: 1.83 m (6 ft 0 in)
- Position: Right-back

Youth career
- BSV Bayreuth
- FSV Bayreuth
- –2008: SpVgg Bayreuth

Senior career*
Years	Team	Apps	(Gls)
2008–2011	SpVgg Bayreuth	85	(2)
2011–2013	1860 Munich II	63	(2)
2013–2014	SV Elversberg II	2	(0)
2013–2014	SV Elversberg	17	(0)
2014–2022	SpVgg Bayreuth	191	(3)
Total		358	(7)
- * Club domestic league appearances and goals

Chris Wolf (born 23 February 1991) is a German former professional footballer who played as a right-back.

== Career ==
Wolf played most of his career for SpVgg Bayreuth. He retired from football after the club reached promotion to 3. Liga after the 2021–22 season, instead becoming a coach for the side.
