= Arnauld Mercier =

French footballer (born 1972)

Personal information
- Date of birth: 4 June 1972 (age 54)
- Place of birth: Bayeux, France
- Height: 1.86 m (6 ft 1 in)
- Position: Defender

Team information
- Current team: Seraing

Senior career*
Years	Team	Apps	(Gls)
1990–1993	Rouen		
1993–1996	Fécamp		
1996–1998	Valenciennes	60	(9)
1998–2001	Reggina	0	(0)
1998–1999	→ Andria (loan)	33	(2)
2000	→ Savoia (loan)	7	(0)
2000–2001	→ Cosenza (loan)	11	(0)
2002–2004	Valenciennes	43	(2)

Managerial career
- 2011–2014: Boussu-Dour
- 2014–2015: Seraing United
- 2016–2017: Roeselare
- 2019–2020: Waasland-Beveren
- 2022–2023: Francs Borains
- 2025: Olympic Charleroi
- 2026–: Seraing
- * Club domestic league appearances and goals

Arnauld Mercier (born 4 June 1972) is a French football manager and a former player. He is currently managing RFC Seraing.

He spent most of his career playing in the French Ligue 2 and Championnat National, but had a spell in Italy where he played three seasons in Serie B. After his playing career, he became a coach, and managed RBDB and Seraing United.

== Playing career ==
Born in Bayeux, Mercier began playing football for Ligue 2 side Rouen in 1990. After three seasons the club were relegated to the Championnat National, and he left for another third-tier club, Fécamp. Mercier spent three seasons with Fécamp and the following two with Valenciennes, continuing to play in the Championnat National.

In 1998, Mercier moved to Italy, joining Serie A side Reggina. He was unable to work his way into the first team and went on loan to Serie B sides Andria, Savoia and Cosenza. Disappointed, he returned to France and played two more seasons for Valenciennes.

== Coaching career ==
After he retired from playing, Mercier began coaching the youth side of Valenciennes. He was appointed manager of Belgian side Royal Boussu Dour Borinage in April 2011.

On 2 January 2019, Mercier returned to Seraing United, this time as a sporting director.
