= Freethiel Stadion =

Multi-use stadium in Beveren, Belgium

Freethielstadion
- Freethiel
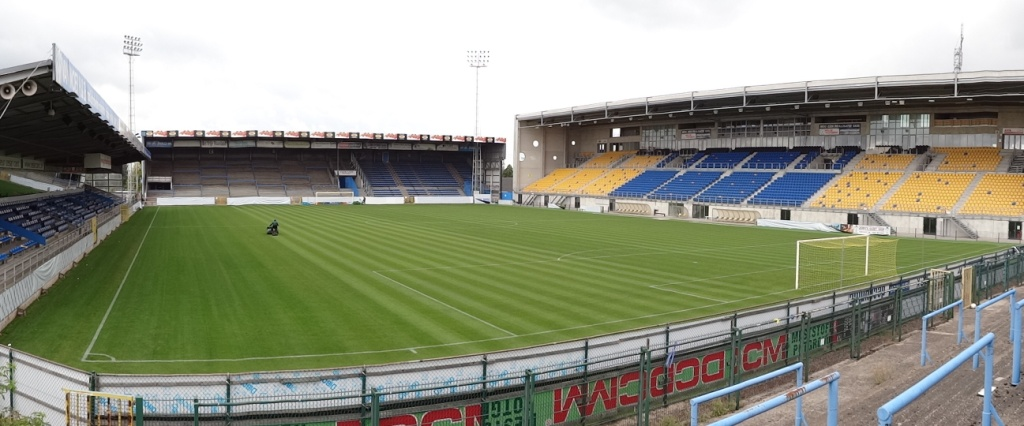
- Interactive map of Freethielstadion
- Location: Beveren, Belgium
- Coordinates: 51°12′51″N 4°14′38″E
- Capacity: 8,190
- Surface: Grass

Construction
- Opened: July 31, 1938
- Renovated: 1949, 1967, 1991, 2008-2009
- Expanded: 1967, 1972, 1974, 1979

Tenant
- Waasland-Beveren

Freethiel Stadion is a multi-use stadium in Beveren, Belgium. The Freethiel Stadium, also known as the Freethiel for short, is the football stadium where the Belgian football club SK Beveren (formerly known as Waasland-Beveren) plays its home games. The stadium was originally played by KSK Beveren, when that club temporarily stopped their men's team in 2010, Waasland-Beveren took its place. The whole complex includes 10 football fields and a fitness hall. It is currently used mostly for football matches. The stadium's name (Freethiel) is a contraction of the name Frederik Thielemans, the man who owned a cycling-track in the Klapperstraat, but made it available to the football club when it was established. The stadium is located in the Klapperstraat in Beveren, and has a capacity of 8,190

== Owner of the Freethiel Stadium ==
The owner of the Freethiel Stadium is the municipality of Beveren, which leaves its use and maintenance to Waasland-Beveren, which replaced KSK Beveren in 2010. On Saturday, September 14, after an agreement with Waasland-Beveren, KSK Beveren played an official match at the Freethiel against neighbor Svelta Melsele for the first time in 12 years. More than a thousand spectators saw KSK Beveren win 1-0.
