= SK Beveren =

Belgian association football club

Beveren
- Full name: Sportkring Beveren
- Founded: May 1936, 1; 90 years ago (as KFC Red Star Haasdonk)
- Ground: Freethiel Stadion, Beveren
- Capacity: 8,190
- Owners: David Blitzer; Jahm Najafi; Jeff Moorad
- Chairman: Jo Van Moer
- Head coach: Tim Bakens
- League: Belgian Pro League
- 2025–26: Challenger Pro League, 1st of 17 (promoted)
- Website: www.skbeveren.be

Sportkring Beveren (SK Beveren) is a Belgian professional association football club based in Beveren, East Flanders. The club is affiliated with the founded number 4068 and has yellow and blue as its colours. The team was founded in 1936 in Haasdonk and joined the Belgian Football Association in 1944 as FC Red Star Haasdonk. In 2002, the club moved to Sint-Niklaas and changed its name to KV Red Star Waasland. From 2010, it continued to play in Beveren under the name KVRS Waasland - SK Beveren until 2022, when it was renamed Sportkring Beveren. They play in the Belgian Pro League.

== History ==
The club was founded in 1936 as Red Star and registered to an amateur football association. In 1944, they joined the Royal Belgian Football Association and started playing in the lowest provincial league of East Flanders. Red Star Haasdonk first reached national football in 2000–01, and they finished first of the series in Promotion. They also reached the 2000–01 Belgian Cup round of 32, losing to first division club Gent. After their first season in the third division, they moved to the bigger stadium of defunct club Sint-Niklase SKE, the Puyenbekestadion, changing their name to KV Red Star Waasland.

In 2003–04, they finished first in their series of the third division and promoted for the first time to the second division. In their first season at the second-highest level of football, Red Star Waasland finished 5th and qualified for the final round. The next season, they finished 4th, their best result as of 2010 but did not qualify for the final round. They reached again the round of 32 of the 2005–06 Belgian Cup, losing to neighbours KSK Beveren. In the 2007–08 Belgian Cup, Red Star Waasland reached the round of 16, their best cup result, by eliminating Lokeren. They lost to Anderlecht in the round of 16. The following season, they finished 4th again in the second division. In the summer of 2010 Red Star Waasland changed its name to Waasland-Beveren and moved to the bigger stadium of Beveren, the Freethiel Stadion.

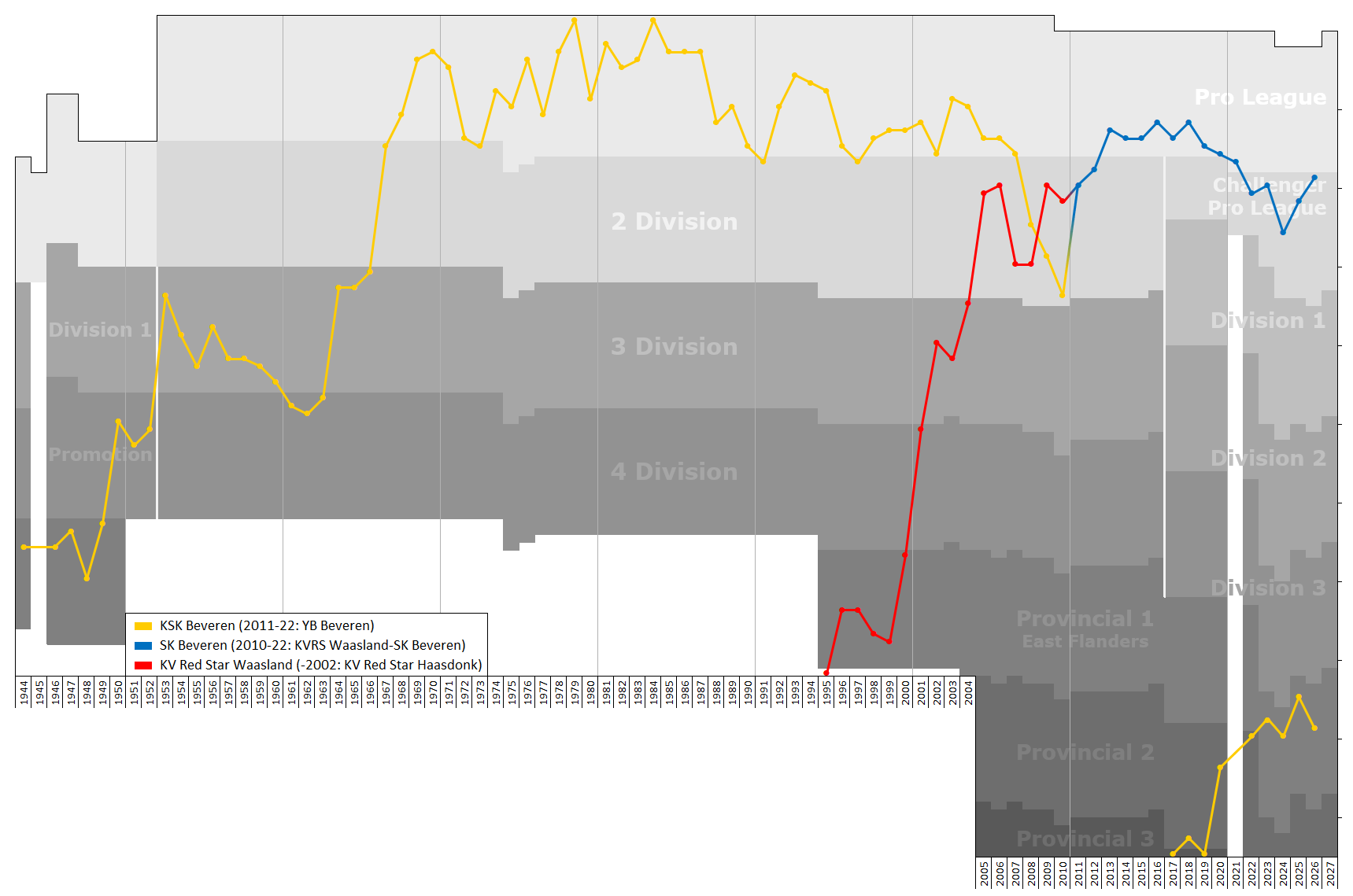
Historical league performance chart of SK Beveren and its predecessors

In 2019–20 Belgian First Division A due to the virus epidemic the league was forced to shut down its competition. At the time of the shut down Waasland Beveren was in 16th position and was expected to relegate having their last game scheduled against KAA Gent. After months of confusion the league decided to close the season the way it left off with one game remaining, without Waasland Beveren having a chance to save themselves competitively from relegation. Unfairly enough the first division B finalists were allowed to play their playoff games for promotion to the First Division A despite the league shutdown. Having seen the hypocrisy, Waasland Beveren decided to take legal action for unfair use of power. The court battle lasted for many weeks and finally justice was awarded in Waasland Beveren favour to remain in First Division. The league was forced to make reforms and change the way the league operated and thus the league comprised 18 teams instead of 16 which included Waasland Beveren and two finalists from First Division B.

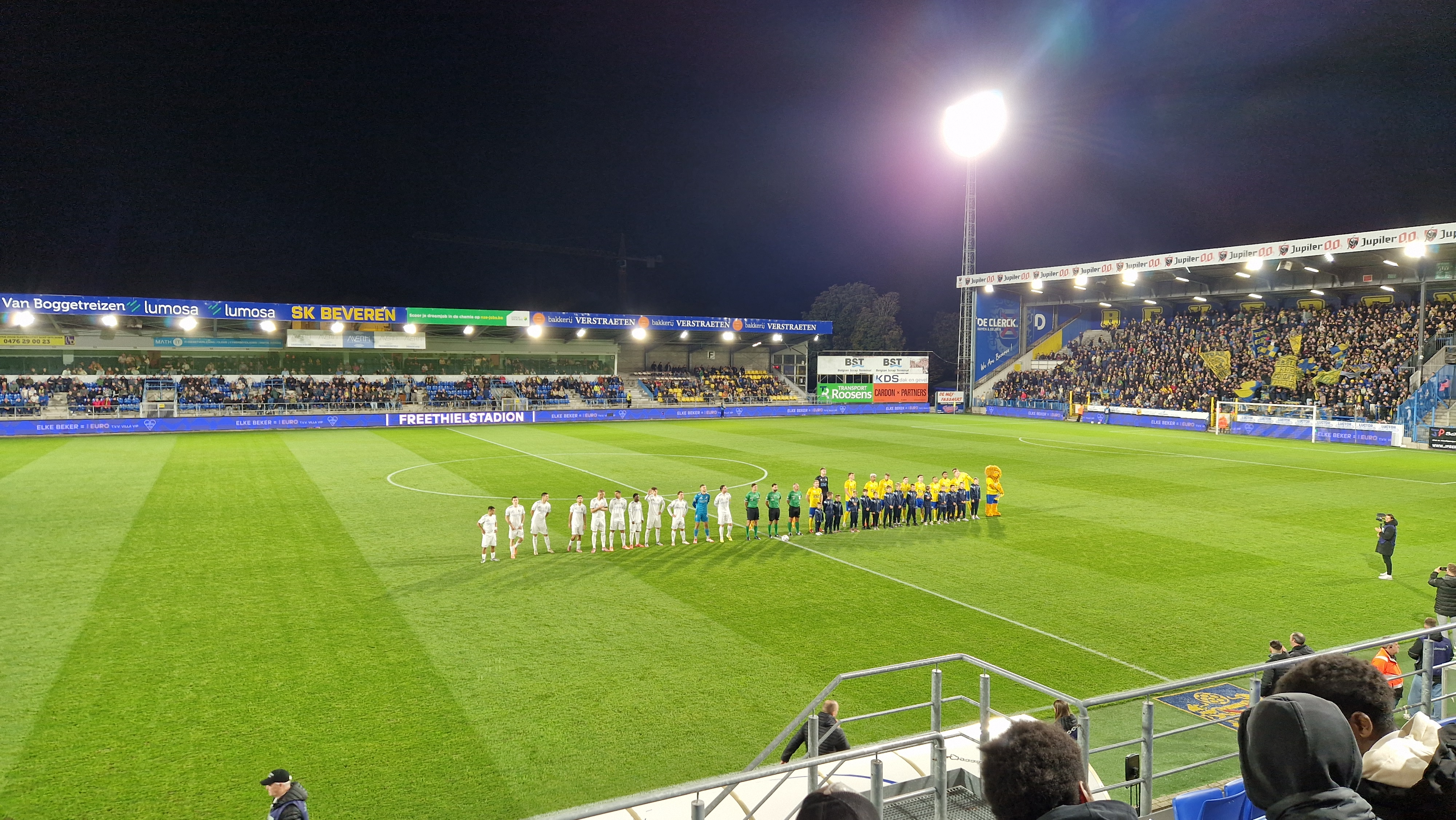
Home game against Patro Eisden, October 2025

In September 2020, an investment group consisting of American businessmen David Blitzer, Jahm Najafi, and Jeff Moorad purchased a 97% share in the club. In June 2022, the club announced it had come to an agreement with KSK Beveren to share the identity of the original club under that name, allowing Waasland-Beveren to be renamed and use the similar name SK Beveren in July 2022.

== Players ==
=== Current squad ===
As of 6 September 2026

Note: Flags indicate national team as defined under FIFA eligibility rules; some limited exceptions apply. Players may hold more than one non-FIFA nationality.

No.	Pos.	Nation	Player
1	GK	GER	Johannes Schenk (on loan from Preußen Münster)
2	DF	ENG	Dominic Thompson
3	DF	BEL	Viktor Boone
4	DF	BEL	Christophe Janssens
5	FW	BEL	Chris Lokesa
7	FW	FRA	Ilyes Najim
8	MF	BEL	Ferre Slegers
9	FW	BFA	Elohim Kaboré (on loan from Hammarby)
10	MF	BEL	Guillaume De Schryver
11	FW	SEN	Junior Diouf
14	MF	BEL	Léandre Kuavita
16	GK	BEL	Maxim Deman
17	FW	CUW	Jearl Margaritha
18	MF	BEL	Sieben Dewaele
20	GK	BEL	Milan De Schutter

No.	Pos.	Nation	Player
21	DF	LUX	Laurent Jans (captain)
22	MF	BEL	Christian Brüls
24	MF	BEL	Arno Verschueren
25	DF	MLI	Cheick Oumar Konaté
26	MF	COD	Noah Mawete
31	DF	BEL	Bruno Godeau
33	FW	NGR	Victor Olatunji (on loan from Real Salt Lake)
34	FW	RSA	Kurt Abrahams
35	DF	FRA	Yoni Gomis (on loan from Strasbourg)
44	MF	GUI	Cheick Condé
48	DF	AUT	Jannik Robatsch (on loan from St. Pauli)
77	DF	CMR	Stephane Keller (on loan from Al-Ittihad)
84	GK	COD	Josua Lusamba
92	FW	BEL	Lennart Mertens

== Club staff ==
Position	Staff
Chairman	(Belgium) Jo Van Moer
Chief Executive Officer	(Belgium) Bart Foubert
Sporting director	(Belgium) Bob Peeters
Head coach	(Netherlands) Marink Reedijk
Assistant head coach	(France) Flavien Le Postollec (Belgium) Gunter Vandebroeck
Goalkeeper coach	(Belgium) Kenny Steppe
Fitness coach	(Belgium) Frederik Bracke
Technical Assistant	(Belgium) Danny De Maesschalck (Belgium) Steven Van Puyvelde
Video analyst	(Belgium) Johan Verelst
Head of Scouting / Video & Performance Analyst	(Morocco) Rachid El hasnaoui
Physical Medicine & Rehabilitation	(France) Thomas Mathieu
Team Doctor	(Belgium) Jan Mathieu
Sports doctor	(Germany) Michael Saelemans
Physiotherapist	(Belgium) Xavier Verstraeten (Belgium) Charlotte Van De Vyvere
Sportsphysiotherapist	(Serbia) Arno Parmentier
Sportscaretaker	(Belgium) Tim De Doncker
Team Manager	(Belgium) Martijn De Jonge

== Managers ==
- (Belgium) Dirk Geeraerd (2005–2006)
- (Belgium) Regi Van Acker (2006–2007)
- (Belgium) Dirk Geeraerd (1 July 2010 – 18 November 2012)
- (Belgium) Glen De Boeck (19 November 2012 – 29 October 2013)
- (Belgium) Bob Peeters (5 November 2013 – 23 May 2014)
- (Belgium) Ronny Van Geneugden (28 May 2014 – 30 December 2014)
- (Belgium) Guido Brepoels (2015)
- (Belgium) Stijn Vreven (2015–2016)
- (North Macedonia) Čedomir Janevski (2017)
- (Belgium) Philippe Clement (2017)
- (Belgium) Sven Vermant (2018)
- (Belgium) Yannick Ferrera (2018)
- (Bosnia and Herzegovina) Adnan Čustović (17 November 2018 – 26 August 2019)
- (France) Arnauld Mercier (30 August 2019 – 2 March 2020)
- (Belgium) Nicky Hayen (4 May 2020 – 30 June 2021)
- (Switzerland) Marc Schneider (1 July 2021 – 27 Feb 2022)
- (Spain) Jordi Condom (28 Feb 2022 – 25 Jun 2022)
- (Belgium) Wim De Decker (2 July 2022 – 1 April 2024)
- (France) Flavien Le Postollec (1 April 2024 – 14 Jun 2024)
- (Belgium) Bob Peeters (1 April 2024 – )
