= List of Belgian football transfers summer 2022 =

This is a list of Belgian football transfers for the 2022 summer transfer window. Only transfers involving a team from the professional divisions are listed, including the 18 teams in the Belgian First Division A and the 8 teams playing in the Belgian First Division B.

The summer transfer window opened on 1 July 2022 and closed on 6 September 2022.

Note that several transfers were announced prior to the opening date. Furthermore, players without a club may join one at any time, either during or in between transfer windows. After the transfer window closes a few completed transfers might still be announced a few days later.

== Transfers ==
Date	Name	Moving from	Moving to	Fee	Note
2 May 2022	(United States) Jorge Hernandez	(Ukraine) FC Chornomorets Odesa	KV Mechelen	Free	
1 July 2022	Youssef Challouk	K.M.S.K. Deinze	KV Kortrijk	Undisclosed	
1 July 2022	Tom Vandenberghe	K.M.S.K. Deinze	KV Kortrijk	Undisclosed	
1 July 2022	Xander Blomme	Club Brugge KV	(Netherlands) Go Ahead Eagles	Free	
1 July 2022	Rayane Bounida	RSC Anderlecht	(Netherlands) AFC Ajax	Free	
1 July 2022	Viktor Boone	K.M.S.K. Deinze	Royale Union Saint-Gilloise	Free	
1 July 2022	Dion De Neve	SV Zulte Waregem	KV Kortrijk	Free	
1 July 2022	(Netherlands) Bjorn Meijer	(Netherlands) FC Groningen	Club Brugge	Undisclosed	
1 July 2022	David Mukuna Trouet	K Beerschot VA	KAA Gent	Undisclosed	
1 July 2022	Patryck Walicki	K Beerschot VA	KAA Gent	Undisclosed	
1 July 2022	Arnaud Dony	Sint-Truidense V.V.	Royale Union Saint-Gilloise	Free	
1 July 2022	Nick Gillekens	Royal Excel Mouscron	K.V.C. Westerlo	Undisclosed	
1 July 2022	Loris Henry	Royal Excel Mouscron	KAA Gent	Undisclosed	
1 July 2022	(Mali) Boubou Diallo	(Senegal) Africa Foot	Standard Liège	Undisclosed	
1 July 2022	Joren Dom	K Beerschot VA	OH Leuven	Free	
1 July 2022	Jules Van Bost	Club Brugge	OH Leuven	Free	
1 July 2022	Jesse De Kée	Club Brugge	OH Leuven	Free	
1 July 2022	Visar Shala	Olsa Brakel	Royal Antwerp F.C.	Free	
1 July 2022	Maxime De Bie	KV Mechelen	Lierse Kempenzonen	Free	
1 July 2022	Jarno Libert	RWDM47	Lierse Kempenzonen	Free	
1 July 2022	Daan Vekemans	OH Leuven	Lierse Kempenzonen	Free	
1 July 2022	Rune van Den Borre	KAA Gent	K.M.S.K. Deinze	Free	
1 July 2022	(Haiti) Rousseau De Poorter	SV Zulte Waregem	K.M.S.K. Deinze	Free	
1 July 2022	Mathis Sturbaut	Club Brugge	KAA Gent	Free	
1 July 2022	Ayman Rahbi	R Antwerp FC	KRC Genk	Undisclosed	
1 July 2022	Jens Heylen	R Antwerp FC	RSC Anderlecht	Undisclosed	
1 July 2022	Kenneth Schuermans	Lierse Kempenzonen	K.M.S.K. Deinze	Free	
1 July 2022	Nordin Jackers	Waasland-Beveren	OH Leuven	Undisclosed	
1 July 2022	Christophe Lepoint	Royal Excel Mouscron	R.F.C. Seraing (1922)	Free	
1 July 2022	Kristof Van Hout	KVC Westerlo	Lommel S.K.	Undisclosed	
1 July 2022	Rune Paeshuyse	KV Mechelen	KAS Eupen	Free	
1 July 2022	(Mali) Ibrahima Cissé	KAA Gent	(Germany) FC Schalke 04	Free	
1 July 2022	(Guinea) Ibrahima Berete	Free Agent	Sint-Truidense V.V.	Free	
1 July 2022	(Netherlands) Bryan Smeets	Lommel S.K.	RWDM47	Undisclosed	
1 July 2022	(Austria) Raphael Holzhauser	K Beerschot VA	OH Leuven	Undisclosed	
1 July 2022	(France) Benjamin Boulenger	R.F.C. Seraing (1922)	Francs Borains	Undisclosed	
1 July 2022	(Portugal) Aurélio Buta	R Antwerp FC	(Germany) Eintracht Frankfurt	Free	
1 July 2022	(Turkey) Sinan Bolat	KAA Gent	KVC Westerlo	Free	
1 July 2022	(Slovenia) Jan Gorenc	(Slovenia) NŠ Mura	KAS Eupen	Undisclosed	
1 July 2022	(Germany) Fatih Kaya	(Germany) FC Ingolstadt 04	Sint-Truidense V.V.	Free	
1 July 2022	(Senegal) Amadou Sagna	Club Brugge	(France) Chamois Niortais F.C.	Undisclosed	
1 July 2022	(Ivory Coast) Silas Gnaka	KAS Eupen	(Germany) 1. FC Magdeburg	Undisclosed	
1 July 2022	(France) Xavier Mercier	OH Leuven	(Hungary) Ferencvárosi TC	Undisclosed	
1 July 2022	Robbe Quirynen	KMSK Deinze	K Beerschot VA	Undisclosed	
1 July 2022	(Ivory Coast) Mamadou Koné	KAS Eupen	KMSK Deinze	Free	
1 July 2022	(Germany) Emilio Kehrer	(Germany) SC Freiburg	Cercle Brugge	Free	
1 July 2022	(Wales) Isaac Christie-Davies	(England) Barnsley F.C.	KAS Eupen	Free	
1 July 2022	(Grenada) Regan Charles-Cook	(Scotland) Ross County F.C.	KAS Eupen	Free	
1 July 2022	(Spain) Ferran Jutglà	(Spain) FC Barcelona	Club Brugge	Undisclosed	
1 July 2022	(Ecuador) Anthony Valencia	(Ecuador) C.S.D. Independiente del Valle	R Antwerp FC	Undisclosed	
1 July 2022	(Croatia) Leon Kreković	K Beerschot VA	(Croatia) HNK Šibenik	Undisclosed	
1 July 2022	(Brazil) Neto Borges	KRC Genk	(France) Clermont Foot	Free	
1 July 2022	Thibaud Verlinden	(Slovakia) FC DAC 1904 Dunajská Streda	K Beerschot VA	Undisclosed	
1 July 2022	Olivier Dumont	Standard Liège	Sint-Truidense V.V.	Undisclosed	
1 July 2022	Zakaria Atteri	Royal Excel Mouscron	F.C.V. Dender E.H.	Undisclosed	
1 July 2022	Kobe Cools	(Luxembourg) F91 Dudelange	F.C.V. Dender E.H.	Undisclosed	
1 July 2022	Stan Braem	SKV Zwevezele	SV Zulte Waregem	Undisclosed	
1 July 2022	Hugo Cuypers	KV Mechelen	KAA Gent	Undisclosed	
1 July 2022	Nicolas Rommens	RWDM47	SV Zulte Waregem	Undisclosed	
1 July 2022	Tom Pietermaat	K Beerschot VA	K. Patro Eisden Maasmechelen	Free	
1 July 2022	Ewoud Pletinckx	SV Zulte Waregem	OH Leuven	Undisclosed	
1 July 2022	(Israel) Yonas Malede	KAA Gent	KV Mechelen	Undisclosed	
1 July 2022	(France) Mike Bettinger	Standard Liège	(France) Le Mans FC	Free	
1 July 2022	Thibo Baeten	(Netherlands) NEC Nijmegen	K Beerschot VA	Loan	
1 July 2022	(Morocco) Ilyas Lefrancq	OH Leuven	KV Mechelen	Undisclosed	
1 July 2022	(Cyprus) Fanos Katelaris	(Cyprus) Apollon Limassol FC	KV Oostende	Free	
1 July 2022	(Spain) Borja López	(Spain) Sporting de Gijón	SV Zulte Waregem	Undisclosed	
1 July 2022	(Ukraine) Oleksandr Drambayev	(Ukraine) FC Shakhtar Donetsk	SV Zulte Waregem	Loan	
1 July 2022	(Germany) Andreas Beck	KAS Eupen	Unattached	Free	
1 July 2022	(Ivory Coast) Emmanuel Agbadou	KAS Eupen	(France) Stade de Reims	Undisclosed	
1 July 2022	(Netherlands) Vincent Janssen	(Mexico) C.F. Monterrey	Royal Antwerp F.C.	Undisclosed	
1 July 2022	(Germany) Lennart Moser	(Germany) 1. FC Union Berlin	KAS Eupen	Undisclosed	
1 July 2022	Jo Coppens	(Germany) MSV Duisburg	Sint-Truidense V.V.	Free	
1 July 2022	(Cameroon) Frank Boya	R Antwerp FC	Sint-Truidense V.V.	Loan	
1 July 2022	Lennart Mertens	KMSK Deinze	Club Brugge KV	Free	
1 July 2022	Owen Jochmans	KAA Gent	OH Leuven	Undisclosed	
1 July 2022	(England) Ross Sykes	(England) Accrington Stanley F.C.	Royale Union Saint-Gilloise	Undisclosed	
1 July 2022	(Burundi) Marco Weymans	(Sweden) Östersunds FK	K Beerschot VA	Free	
1 July 2022	(Mali) Habib Keïta	(France) Olympique Lyonnais	KV Kortrijk	Loan	
1 July 2022	(Czech Republic) Jan Král	(Czech Republic) FC Hradec Králové	KAS Eupen	Undisclosed	
1 July 2022	(Spain) Sergio Moyita	(Spain) UCAM Murcia CF	KMSK Deinze	Free	
1 July 2022	(Nigeria) Abdullahi Ibrahim Alhassan	(Portugal) C.D. Nacional	K Beerschot VA	Free	
1 July 2022	Thijs Lambrix	Lommel S.K.	(Netherlands) MVV Maastricht	Undisclosed	
1 July 2022	(England) Matthew Sorinola	Royale Union Saint-Gilloise	(Wales) Swansea City	Loan	
1 July 2022	(Democratic Republic of the Congo) Isaac Tshibangu	RSC Anderlecht	(Turkey) Bandırmaspor	Undisclosed	
1 July 2022	(Japan) Koki Saito	Lommel S.K.	(Netherlands) Sparta Rotterdam	Loan	
1 July 2022	Madi Monamay	KRC Genk	(Germany) Bayer Leverkusen	Undisclosed	
1 July 2022	Jonathan Heris	KAS Eupen	RWDM47	Free	
1 July 2022	Sam Valcke	F.C.V. Dender E.H.	K. Patro Eisden Maasmechelen	Free	
1 July 2022	(France) Valentin Vanbaleghem	R.E. Virton	(France) CS Sedan Ardennes	Free	
1 July 2022	(Denmark) Christoffer Remmer	KVC Westerlo	(Denmark) SønderjyskE Fodbold	Free	
1 July 2022	Flor Van Den Eynden	KV Mechelen	(Netherlands) Helmond Sport	Free	
1 July 2022	Hervé Matthys	(Netherlands) ADO Den Haag	K Beerschot VA	Free	
1 July 2022	(France) Marvin Tshibuabua	(France) AS Saint-Étienne	R.F.C. Seraing (1922)	Undisclosed	
1 July 2022	Yentl Van Genechten	KRC Genk	KAS Eupen	Undisclosed	
1 July 2022	Kevin Kis	Lommel S.K.	K. Patro Eisden Maasmechelen	Undisclosed	
1 July 2022	Jelle Van Neck	Club Brugge KV	(France) Olympique de Marseille	Undisclosed	
1 July 2022	(Netherlands) Achraf El Bouchataoui	(Netherlands) Feyenoord	KMSK Deinze	Undisclosed	
1 July 2022	(Germany) Christopher Scott	(Germany) Bayern Munich	R Antwerp FC	Undisclosed	
1 July 2022	(Tanzania) Novatus Dismas	(Israel) Maccabi Tel Aviv F.C.	SV Zulte Waregem	Undisclosed	
1 July 2022	(Germany) David Winke	(Germany) 1. FC Köln	KMSK Deinze	Free	
1 July 2022	Sebastiaan Brebels	(Iceland) Knattspyrnufélag Akureyrar	Lierse Kempenzonen	Undisclosed	
1 July 2022	Joedrick Pupe	Sint-Eloois-Winkel Sport	Lierse Kempenzonen	Free	
1 July 2022	Davino Verhulst	(Greece) Apollon Smyrnis F.C.	R Antwerp FC	Undisclosed	
1 July 2022	(Germany) Nazif Tchadjei	(Germany) Alemannia Aachen	KAS Eupen	Free	
1 July 2022	(Portugal) Sérgio Conceição	(Portugal) C.F. Estrela da Amadora	R.F.C. Seraing (1922)	Undisclosed	
1 July 2022	(Spain) Gonzalo Almenara	(Spain) Algeciras CF	KMSK Deinze	Undisclosed	
1 July 2022	Massimo Bruno	(Turkey) Bursaspor	KV Kortrijk	Undisclosed	
1 July 2022	Martin Delavallée	Royal Excel Mouscron	RSC Charleroi	Free	
1 July 2022	William Simba	Royal Excel Mouscron	Club Brugge KV	Free	
1 July 2022	(Democratic Republic of the Congo) Nelson Balongo	Sint-Truidense V.V.	(Poland) ŁKS Łódź	Free	
1 July 2022	(France) Prosper Mendy	RE Virton	(Bulgaria) FC Spartak Varna	Free	
1 July 2022	(Georgia (country)) Tsotne Bendianishvili	KV Kortrijk	Sint-Eloois-Winkel Sport	Free	
1 July 2022	(Cape Verde) Alexis Gonçalves	RWDM47	(France) GOAL FC	Undisclosed	
1 July 2022	Mehdi Tarfi	KMSK Deinze	Lierse Kempenzonen	Undisclosed	
1 July 2022	Victor Swinnen	Royale Union Saint-Gilloise	S.C. Eendracht Aalst	Undisclosed	
1 July 2022	Gaël Kakudji	R.F.C. Seraing (1922)	S.C. Eendracht Aalst	Free	
1 July 2022	(Senegal) Wagane Faye	R.F.C. Seraing (1922)	RAAL La Louvière	Free	
1 July 2022	Arthur Allemeersch	OH Leuven	(Netherlands) TOP Oss	Free	
1 July 2022	Valentin Guillaume	RE Virton	R.F.C. Seraing (1922)	Undisclosed	
1 July 2022	(Portugal) Leandro Rocha	KAS Eupen	Lierse Kempenzonen	Undisclosed	
1 July 2022	(Romania) Valentin Cojocaru	(Ukraine) SC Dnipro-1	OH Leuven	Undisclosed	
1 July 2022	(Germany) Dennis Eckert	(Germany) FC Ingolstadt 04	Royale Union Saint-Gilloise	Undisclosed	
1 July 2022	Dimitri Lavalée	(Germany) 1. FSV Mainz 05	KV Mechelen	Undisclosed	
1 July 2022	(Nigeria) Ishaq Abdulrazak	(Sweden) IFK Norrköping	RSC Anderlecht	Undisclosed	
1 July 2022	Lorenzo Noviello	KVC Westerlo	(Netherlands) MVV Maastricht	Free	
1 July 2022	(Czech Republic) Michael Krmenčík	Club Brugge KV	(Indonesia) Persija Jakarta	Undisclosed	
1 July 2022	(Germany) Johannes Eggestein	R Antwerp FC	(Germany) FC St. Pauli	Undisclosed	
1 July 2022	(Montenegro) Nikola Ivezić	(Montenegro) FK Podgorica	Lommel S.K.	Undisclosed	
1 July 2022	(Australia) Jason Davidson	(Australia) Melbourne Victory FC	KAS Eupen	Undisclosed	
1 July 2022	(Ecuador) Nilson Angulo	(Ecuador) L.D.U. Quito	RSC Anderlecht	Undisclosed	
1 July 2022	(United States) Bryan Reynolds	(Italy) AS Roma	KVC Westerlo	Loan	
1 July 2022	Mardochee Nzita	(Italy) Delfino Pescara 1936	K Beerschot VA	Undisclosed	
1 July 2022	Bill Lathouwers	S.K. Beveren	K Beerschot VA	Free	
1 July 2022	(Ghana) Osman Bukari	KAA Gent	(Serbia) Red Star Belgrade	Undisclosed	
1 July 2022	(France) Faitout Maouassa	Club Brugge KV	(France) Montpellier HSC	Loan	
1 July 2022	Nathan Rodes	RFC Liège	F.C.V. Dender E.H.	Free	
1 July 2022	Michaël Lallemand	RFC Liège	F.C.V. Dender E.H.	Free	
1 July 2022	(Turkey) Ravil Tagir	(Turkey) İstanbul Başakşehir F.K.	KVC Westerlo	Free	
1 July 2022	(Guinea-Bissau) Carlos Embaló	KAS Eupen	(Italy) A.S. Cittadella	Undisclosed	
1 July 2022	(Spain) Nacho Miras	(Spain) Real Balompédica Linense	KMSK Deinze	Undisclosed	
1 July 2022	Javan Ngoyi	Royale Union Saint-Gilloise	R. Olympic Charleroi	Free	
1 July 2022	(Guadeloupe) Lenny Nangis	RWDM47	(France) AS Nancy Lorraine	Free	
1 July 2022	(Mali) Dorgeles Nene	(Austria) FC Red Bull Salzburg	KVC Westerlo	Loan	
1 July 2022	(Togo) Euloge Placca Fessou	K Beerschot VA	(Belarus) FC Shakhtyor Soligorsk	Free	
1 July 2022	Maxime Mignon	R.F.C. Seraing (1922)	URSL Visé	Free	
1 July 2022	(Croatia) Matej Mitrović	Club Brugge KV	(Croatia) HNK Rijeka	Free	
1 July 2022	(Japan) Musashi Suzuki	K Beerschot VA	(Japan) Gamba Osaka	Free	
1 July 2022	(Japan) Ayase Ueda	(Japan) Kashima Antlers	Cercle Brugge	Undisclosed	
1 July 2022	(France) Sambou Sissoko	(France) Stade de Reims	R.F.C. Seraing (1922)	Undisclosed	
1 July 2022	(Senegal) Malick Fofana	(United Arab Emirates) Al Hilal United FC	S.K. Beveren	Undisclosed	
1 July 2022	(Portugal) Fábio Baptista	(Portugal) S.L. Benfica B	Sint-Truidense V.V.	Free	
1 July 2022	(France) Eric Bocat	Royal Excel Mouscron	Sint-Truidense V.V.	Free	
1 July 2022	(The Gambia) Muhammed Badamosi	KV Kortrijk	(Serbia) FK Čukarički	Loan	
2 July 2022	(Brazil) Metinho	(France) ES Troyes AC	Lommel S.K.	Loan	
2 July 2022	(Ivory Coast) Vakoun Issouf Bayo	RSC Charleroi	(England) Watford F.C.	Undisclosed	
2 July 2022	Babacar Dione	Royal Excel Mouscron	(Bulgaria) PFC Lokomotiv Plovdiv	Free	
3 July 2022	Noah Aelterman	Club Brugge KV	Royal Knokke F.C.	Undisclosed	
3 July 2022	Esteban Casagolda	F.C.V. Dender E.H.	K.S.C. Lokeren-Temse	Free	
3 July 2022	Joachim Carcela	Royal Excel Mouscron	KMSK Deinze	Free	
3 July 2022	(Ivory Coast) Simon Adingra	(England) Brighton & Hove Albion	Royale Union Saint-Gilloise	Loan	
4 July 2022	(Italy) Sebastiano Esposito	(Italy) Inter Milan	RSC Anderlecht	Loan	
4 July 2022	(Canada) Cyle Larin	(Turkey) Beşiktaş J.K.	Club Brugge KV	Free	
4 July 2022	(Curaçao) Joshua Zimmerman	(Netherlands) Almere City FC	OH Leuven	Undisclosed	
4 July 2022	(Iceland) Jón Dagur Þorsteinsson	(Denmark) AGF	OH Leuven	Free	
4 July 2022	Julien Ngoy	KAS Eupen	KV Mechelen	Free	
4 July 2022	(Georgia (country)) Giorgi Chakvetadze	KAA Gent	(Slovakia) ŠK Slovan Bratislava	Loan	
4 July 2022	(Netherlands) Michel Vlap	RSC Anderlecht	(Netherlands) FC Utrecht	Undisclosed	
5 July 2022	(Morocco) Hamza Mendyl	(Germany) FC Schalke 04	OH Leuven	Undisclosed	
5 July 2022	(United States) Griffin Yow	(United States) D.C. United	KVC Westerlo	Undisclosed	
5 July 2022	(France) Pierre Patron	(France) Le Mans FC	RSC Charleroi	Undisclosed	
5 July 2022	(Spain) Teo Quintero	(Spain) CE Sabadell FC	KMSK Deinze	Free	
5 July 2022	(Democratic Republic of the Congo) Samuel Bastien	Standard Liège	(England) Burnley FC	Undisclosed	
5 July 2022	(England) Cameron Humphreys	SV Zulte Waregem	(England) Rotherham United F.C.	Free	
5 July 2022	(Switzerland) Leonardo Bertone	S.K. Beveren	(Switzerland) FC Thun	Free	
5 July 2022	Brendan Schoonbaert	S.K. Beveren	Royal Knokke F.C.	Free	
5 July 2022	Andi Koshi	Cercle Brugge	K Beerschot VA	Undisclosed	
6 July 2022	Jonathan Mfumu	F.C.V. Dender E.H.	Royal Knokke F.C.	Free	
6 July 2022	Louis Franssen	Royal Excel Mouscron	UR La Louvière Centre	Free	
6 July 2022	(Guinea) Thierno Barry	(France) FC Sochaux-Montbéliard	S.K. Beveren	Free	
6 July 2022	(France) Sandro Trémoulet	(France) FC Sète 34	R.F.C. Seraing (1922)	Undisclosed	
6 July 2022	Loïs Openda	Club Brugge KV	(France) RC Lens	Undisclosed	
7 July 2022	Michiel De Looze	KMSK Deinze	Royal Knokke F.C.	Loan	
7 July 2022	Briek Morel	RSC Anderlecht	(Germany) TSG Hoffenheim	Undisclosed	
7 July 2022	Marciano Aziz	KAS Eupen	(Iceland) Ungmennafélagið Afturelding	Loan	
7 July 2022	(Nigeria) Adewale Oladoya	KAA Gent	(Slovakia) AS Trenčín	Free	
7 July 2022	(France) Frédéric Duplus	Royal Excel Mouscron	Standard Liège	Free	
7 July 2022	(Democratic Republic of the Congo) Jackson Muleka	Standard Liège	(Turkey) Beşiktaş J.K.	Undisclosed	
8 July 2022	(United States) Tyler Wolff	(United States) Atlanta United FC	S.K. Beveren	Loan	
8 July 2022	(Turkey) Halil Akbunar	(Turkey) Göztepe S.K.	K.V.C. Westerlo	Undisclosed	
8 July 2022	(Ivory Coast) Olivier N'Zi	(Austria) Kapfenberger SV	RWDM47	Loan	
8 July 2022	(Brazil) Vinícius Souza	Lommel S.K.	(Spain) RCD Espanyol	Loan	
8 July 2022	(Nigeria) Valentine Ozornwafor	RSC Charleroi	(France) FC Sochaux-Montbéliard	Loan	
9 July 2022	Arne Knollenburg	S.K. Beveren	K.R.C. Mechelen	Free	
10 July 2022	Alexander Corryn	Cercle Brugge	S.K. Beveren	Free	
10 July 2022	(France) Didier Desprez	RSC Charleroi	(France) Paris 13 Atletico	Loan	
10 July 2022	(Brazil) Everton Luiz	(United States) Real Salt Lake	S.K. Beveren	Undisclosed	
11 July 2022	Jorn Brondeel	(Netherlands) Willem II	S.K. Beveren	Undisclosed	
11 July 2022	(Portugal) João Gamboa	(Portugal) G.D. Estoril Praia	OH Leuven	Free	
11 July 2022	(France) Simon Elisor	(France) AC Ajaccio	R.F.C. Seraing (1922)	Undisclosed	
12 July 2022	(Norway) Kristian Thorstvedt	KRC Genk	(Italy) U.S. Sassuolo Calcio	Undisclosed	
12 July 2022	Boli Bolingoli	(Scotland) Celtic FC	KV Mechelen	Undisclosed	
12 July 2022	(Republic of Ireland) Josh Cullen	RSC Anderlecht	(England) Burnley F.C.	Undisclosed	
12 July 2022	Samuel Lukisa	Sint-Truidense V.V.	(Italy) U.C. Sampdoria	Undisclosed	
12 July 2022	(Netherlands) Alessio Da Cruz	(Italy) Parma Calcio 1913	KV Mechelen	Undisclosed	
12 July 2022	Wouter George	KAA Gent	OH Leuven	Undisclosed	
13 July 2022	(Bulgaria) Ivan Goranov	(Bulgaria) Levski Sofia	RSC Charleroi	End of loan	
13 July 2022	(Bulgaria) Ivan Goranov	RSC Charleroi	(Greece) PAS Lamia 1964	Undisclosed	
13 July 2022	(Denmark) Jonas Bager	Royale Union Saint-Gilloise	RSC Charleroi	Free	
13 July 2022	Gianni Bruno	KAA Gent	Sint-Truidense V.V.	Loan	
13 July 2022	Tibo Herbots	Royale Union Saint-Gilloise	K.V.K. Tienen-Hageland	Free	
13 July 2022	Tracy Mpati	RWDM47	Francs Borains	Free	
14 July 2022	(Germany) Jesaja Herrmann	KV Kortrijk	(Netherlands) NAC Breda	Loan	
14 July 2022	(Netherlands) Noah Ohio	(Germany) RB Leipzig	Standard Liège	Undisclosed	
14 July 2022	(France) Benoît Poulain	KAS Eupen	(France) Nîmes Olympique	Free	
14 July 2022	(France) Damien Marcq	Royale Union Saint-Gilloise	RSC Charleroi	Free	
14 July 2022	(Senegal) Franck Kanouté	Cercle Brugge	(France) FC Sochaux-Montbéliard	Loan	
15 July 2022	Yannick Put	K.R.C. Mechelen	S.K. Beveren	Free	
15 July 2022	Yannick Vandersmissen	Lommel S.K.	K. Bocholter V.V.	Free	
15 July 2022	(Portugal) João Silva	(Spain) Deportivo Alavés	KV Kortrijk	Undisclosed	
15 July 2022	(Tunisia) Mohamed Gouaida	(Germany) SV Waldhof Mannheim	RE Virton	Free	
15 July 2022	(France) Thomas Vincensini	(France) SC Bastia	RE Virton	Free	
15 July 2022	Kino Delorge	(Germany) SV 19 Straelen	RE Virton	Free	
15 July 2022	Sacha Banse	KAA Gent	Standard Liège	Free	
15 July 2022	Arne Cassaert	Cercle Brugge	RE Virton	Loan	
15 July 2022	Toby Alderweireld	(Qatar) Al-Duhail SC	R Antwerp FC	Undisclosed	
16 July 2022	(Japan) Shion Homma	(Japan) Albirex Niigata	Club Brugge KV	Undisclosed	
16 July 2022	Stallone Limbombe	Lierse Kempenzonen	(Cyprus) Nea Salamis Famagusta FC	Free	
17 July 2022	Mathieu De Smet	SV Zulte Waregem	(Netherlands) HSV Hoek	Free	
17 July 2022	Fabio Ferraro	RSC Charleroi	RWDM47	Free	
17 July 2022	(Martinique) Mickaël Biron	KV Oostende	RWDM47	Undisclosed	
17 July 2022	(Republic of the Congo) Guy Mbenza	R Antwerp FC	(Saudi Arabia) Al-Tai FC	Undisclosed	
17 July 2022	Arne Cuypers	KRC Genk	K. Patro Eisden Maasmechelen	Free	
18 July 2022	(Ivory Coast) William Togui	KV Mechelen	(Israel) Hapoel Jerusalem F.C.	Loan	
18 July 2022	(Denmark) Casper Nielsen	Royale Union Saint-Gilloise	Club Brugge KV	Undisclosed	
18 July 2022	(Argentina) Nicolás Castro	(Argentina) Newell's Old Boys	KRC Genk	Undisclosed	
18 July 2022	(Argentina) Santi Ramos Mingo	(Spain) FC Barcelona	OH Leuven	Free	
19 July 2022	(Austria) Luca Meisl	(Austria) SV Ried	K Beerschot VA	Undisclosed	
19 July 2022	(Netherlands) Beau Reus	(Netherlands) AZ Alkmaar	S.K. Beveren	Undisclosed	
19 July 2022	(Italy) Paul Okon Junior	Club Brugge KV	(Portugal) S.L. Benfica	Undisclosed	
19 July 2022	(France) Lucas Larade	(France) AS Monaco FC	Cercle Brugge	Undisclosed	
19 July 2022	(France) Louis Torres	(France) AS Monaco FC	Cercle Brugge	Undisclosed	
19 July 2022	(Portugal) Fábio Silva	(England) Wolverhampton Wanderers F.C.	RSC Anderlecht	Loan	
19 July 2022	(Brazil) Arthur Sales	Lommel S.K.	(Portugal) F.C. Paços de Ferreira	Loan	
20 July 2022	(Poland) Radosław Majecki	(France) AS Monaco FC	Cercle Brugge	Loan	
20 July 2022	(France) Thomas Didillon	Cercle Brugge	(France) AS Monaco FC	Loan	
20 July 2022	(Madagascar) Hakim Abdallah	Lierse Kempenzonen	RE Virton	Free	
20 July 2022	(Republic of the Congo) Yann Mabella	Racing FC Union Luxembourg	RE Virton	Free	
20 July 2022	(Nigeria) Ejaita Ifoni	(Mozambique) Associação Black Bulls	R.F.C. Seraing (1922)	Undisclosed	
20 July 2022	(Denmark) Nicolas Madsen	(Denmark) FC Midtjylland	KVC Westerlo	Undisclosed	
20 July 2022	(Scotland) Lawrence Shankland	K Beerschot VA	(Scotland) Heart of Midlothian F.C.	Undisclosed	
20 July 2022	(France) Mathieu Cafaro	Standard Liège	(France) AS Saint-Étienne	Loan	
21 July 2022	(Portugal) Guilherme Afonso	Standard Liège	(Portugal) S.L. Benfica	Undisclosed	
21 July 2022	(Ivory Coast) Aboubakar Keita	RSC Charleroi	(Israel) Sektzia Ness Ziona F.C.	Loan	
21 July 2022	(Guinea) Ibrahima Breze Fofana	Club Brugge KV	(Sweden) Hammarby Talang FF	Undisclosed	
21 July 2022	(Netherlands) Michael Mulder	(Netherlands) ADO Den Haag	S.K. Beveren	Undisclosed	
22 July 2022	(Ghana) Mohammed Dauda	RSC Anderlecht	(Spain) CD Tenerife	Loan	
22 July 2022	(France) Daniel Labila	Standard Liège	(Germany) TSG 1899 Hoffenheim	Undisclosed	
22 July 2022	(Algeria) Ahmed Nadhir Benbouali	(Algeria) Paradou AC	RSC Charleroi	Undisclosed	
22 July 2022	Djovkar Doudaev	RWDM47	SK Pepingen-Halle	Loan	
22 July 2022	Jeremie Manzangale Singa	RWDM47	SK Pepingen-Halle	Loan	
22 July 2022	Simon Paulet	KVC Westerlo	RE Virton	Loan	
22 July 2022	(Benin) Yannick Aguemon	OH Leuven	RE Virton	Loan	
22 July 2022	(France) Yanice Abbou	RWDM47	SK Pepingen-Halle	Loan	
23 July 2022	(Argentina) Gastón Ávila	(Argentina) Boca Juniors	R Antwerp FC	Undisclosed	
23 July 2022	(Japan) Ko Matsubara	Sint-Truidense V.V.	(Japan) Júbilo Iwata	Free	
23 July 2022	(Denmark) Jacob Barrett Laursen	(Germany) Arminia Bielefeld	Standard Liège	Undisclosed	
23 July 2022	(Brazil) Heitor	(Brazil) Sport Club Internacional	Cercle Brugge	Loan	
24 July 2022	Alessio Sternon	KAS Eupen	RRC Stockay-Warfusée	Free	
25 July 2022	Lucas Walbrecq	Union Rochefort	Lierse Kempenzonen	Free	
25 July 2022	Romain Donnez	RSC Charleroi	Francs Borains	Free	
26 July 2022	(Spain) Sergio Moyita	KMSK Deinze	(Spain) CD Alcoyano	Loan	
26 July 2022	(Turkey) Sidi Berat Haroun	Lommel SK	(Turkey) Manisa F.K.	Undisclosed	
26 July 2022	(Cameroon) Serge Tabekou	Royal Excel Mouscron	Lierse Kempenzonen	Free	
26 July 2022	(Guinea) Malick Keita	Sint-Truidense V.V.	R Antwerp FC	Free	
26 July 2022	Jens Cools	KAS Eupen	(Saudi Arabia) Al-Riyadh SC	Free	
27 July 2022	Kerian Atheba	Royale Union Saint-Gilloise	KAA Gent	Free	
27 July 2022	Dorian Dessoleil	R Antwerp FC	KV Kortrijk	Loan	
27 July 2022	(Ukraine) Bohdan Mykhaylichenko	RSC Anderlecht	(Ukraine) FC Shakhtar Donetsk	Loan	
27 July 2022	(England) Dillon Phillips	(England) Cardiff City F.C.	KV Oostende	Loan	
27 July 2022	(England) Osaze Urhoghide	(Scotland) Celtic F.C.	KV Oostende	Loan	
27 July 2022	(Guinea) Abdoulaye Sylla	(France) FC Nantes	R.F.C. Seraing (1922)	Undisclosed	
27 July 2022	(Sweden) Gustaf Nilsson	(Germany) SV Wehen Wiesbaden	Royale Union Saint-Gilloise	Undisclosed	
28 July 2022	(Brazil) Vitinho	Cercle Brugge	(England) Burnley F.C.	Undisclosed	
28 July 2022	(Nigeria) David Okereke	Club Brugge KV	(Italy) U.S. Cremonese	Undisclosed	
28 July 2022	(Scotland) Fraser Hornby	(France) Stade de Reims	KV Oostende	Loan	
29 July 2022	(Japan) Junya Ito	KRC Genk	(France) Stade de Reims	Undisclosed	
29 July 2022	(Republic of the Congo) Ravy Tsouka	(Sweden) Helsingborgs IF	SV Zulte Waregem	Undisclosed	
29 July 2022	(France) Leroy Abanda	(Italy) A.C. Milan	R.F.C. Seraing (1922)	Undisclosed	
29 July 2022	(Morocco) Nassim Chadli	(France) ES Troyes AC	Lommel SK	Loan	
29 July 2022	(Italy) Matteo Perri	(Italy) Pordenone Calcio	RE Virton	Free	
29 July 2022	Camil Mmaee	Standard Liège	(Italy) Bologna F.C. 1909	Free	
30 July 2022	(Poland) Krystian Borecki	RSC Anderlecht	(Italy) Venezia F.C.	Undisclosed	
30 July 2022	Junior Moné	R.E. Mouscron	Solières Sport	Free	
30 July 2022	Laurens De Bock	SV Zulte Waregem	(Greece) Atromitos F.C.	Undisclosed	
30 July 2022	(Netherlands) Oussama El Azzouzi	(Netherlands) FC Emmen	Royale Union Saint-Gilloise	Undisclosed	
1 August 2022	(Spain) Dani Ramírez	(Poland) Lech Poznań	SV Zulte Waregem	Free	
1 August 2022	(Turkey) Oğuz Kağan Güçtekin	KVC Westerlo	(Turkey) Bandırmaspor	Loan	
1 August 2022	(Algeria) Ishak Boussouf	Lommel SK	(Algeria) CR Belouizdad	Loan	
2 August 2022	(Italy) Lorenzo Paolucci	Royale Union Saint-Gilloise	(Italy) U.S. Ancona	Free	
2 August 2022	(Ecuador) Joel Ordoñez	(Ecuador) Independiente del Valle	Club Brugge KV	Undisclosed	
2 August 2022	Sander Coopman	R Antwerp FC	S.K. Beveren	Free	
2 August 2022	(Nigeria) Victor Boniface	(Norway) FK Bodø/Glimt	Royale Union Saint-Gilloise	Undisclosed	
2 August 2022	Charles De Ketelaere	Club Brugge KV	(Italy) A.C. Milan	Undisclosed	
3 August 2022	Zakaria Bakkali	RSC Anderlecht	(Netherlands) RKC Waalwijk	Free	
3 August 2022	(France) Stanley Nsoki	Club Brugge KV	(Germany) TSG 1899 Hoffenheim	Undisclosed	
3 August 2022	(Algeria) Réda Halaïmia	K Beerschot VA	(Algeria) MC Alger	Free	
3 August 2022	(Cameroon) Marius Noubissi	K Beerschot VA	(France) Valenciennes FC	Free	
3 August 2022	Antoine Lejoly	K Beerschot VA	RFC Liège	Free	
3 August 2022	Stef De Backer	FCV Dender	KVK Ninove	Free	
3 August 2022	Daan Van den Brande	Club Brugge KV	(Netherlands) PSV Eindhoven	Undisclosed	
4 August 2022	(Slovenia) Nicolas Rajsel	(Azerbaijan) Sabail FK	F.C.V. Dender E.H.	Free	
4 August 2022	Jarne Steuckers	Sint-Truidense V.V.	(Netherlands) MVV Maastricht	Loan	
4 August 2022	Mitchy Ntelo	Standard Liège	RSC Charleroi	Free	
4 August 2022	(Netherlands) Emanuel Emegha	R Antwerp FC	(Austria) SK Sturm Graz	Undisclosed	
4 August 2022	(Canada) Iké Ugbo	KRC Genk	(France) ES Troyes AC	Undisclosed	
4 August 2022	Manuel Benson	R Antwerp FC	(England) Burnley FC	Undisclosed	
4 August 2022	Maxime Delanghe	(Netherlands) PSV Eindhoven	Lierse Kempenzonen	Undisclosed	
4 August 2022	(Nigeria) Blessing Eleke	K Beerschot VA	(Japan) Kashima Antlers	Undisclosed	
4 August 2022	(Switzerland) Léo Seydoux	KVC Westerlo	K Beerschot VA	Loan	
5 August 2022	Jellert Van Landschoot	(Netherlands) Helmond Sport	KMSK Deinze	Free	
5 August 2022	(United States) Kyle Duncan	KV Oostende	(United States) New York Red Bulls	Loan	
5 August 2022	(Spain) Adrián Ortolá	(Spain) Girona FC	KMSK Deinze	Undisclosed	
5 August 2022	(Kosovo) Arbnor Muja	(Kosovo) FC Drita	R Antwerp FC	Undisclosed	
6 August 2022	(Moldova) Lado Akhalaia	(Italy) Torino F.C.	RE Virton	Loan	
6 August 2022	(Albania) Din Sula	RE Virton	Royal Knokke F.C.	Loan	
6 August 2022	(Ukraine) Roman Bezus	KAA Gent	(Cyprus) AC Omonia	Free	
7 August 2022	(Netherlands) Jurgen Ekkelenkamp	(Germany) Hertha BSC	R Antwerp FC	Undisclosed	
8 August 2022	(South Korea) Hong Hyun-seok	(Austria) LASK	KAA Gent	Undisclosed	
8 August 2022	(France) Michel Espinosa	Free Agent	RE Virton	Free	
8 August 2022	(France) Rayanne Khemais	Free Agent	RE Virton	Free	
8 August 2022	Matias Lloci	KVC Westerlo	RE Virton	Free	
9 August 2022	(Spain) Álex Granell	(Bolivia) Club Bolívar	Lommel S.K.	Undisclosed	
9 August 2022	(Denmark) Rasmus Carstensen	(Denmark) Silkeborg IF	KRC Genk	Undisclosed	
9 August 2022	(Thailand) Kawin Thamsatchanan	OH Leuven	(Thailand) Muangthong United F.C.	Undisclosed	
9 August 2022	Arno De Kuyffer	K.S.C. Lokeren-Temse	K Beerschot VA	Free	
10 August 2022	(Sweden) Gustav Engvall	KV Mechelen	(Norway) Sarpsborg 08 FF	Loan	
10 August 2022	(Nigeria) Cyriel Dessers	KRC Genk	(Italy) U.S. Cremonese	Undisclosed	
10 August 2022	(Argentina) Matías Galarza	(Argentina) Argentinos Juniors	KRC Genk	Undisclosed	
10 August 2022	(France) Kevin Ousmane	(France) Olympique Lyonnais	R.F.C. Seraing (1922)	Free	
10 August 2022	(Nigeria) Taofeek Ismaheel	(France) FC Lorient	S.K. Beveren	Loan	
11 August 2022	Mohamed Loua	(Luxembourg) FC Swift Hesperange	RE Virton	Free	
11 August 2022	(Luxembourg) Timothy Martin	RE Virton	R.F.C. Seraing (1922)	Loan	
11 August 2022	Jur Schryvers	SK Beveren	KMSK Deinze	Free	
12 August 2022	(Uruguay) Federico Ricca	Club Brugge KV	OH Leuven	Undisclosed	
12 August 2022	Thibault Vlietinck	Club Brugge KV	OH Leuven	Undisclosed	
12 August 2022	(Trinidad and Tobago) Sheldon Bateau	(Turkey) Samsunspor	S.K. Beveren	Loan	
12 August 2022	Daan Dierckx	(Italy) Parma Calcio 1913	KRC Genk	Loan	
12 August 2022	Rein Van Helden	Sint-Truidense V.V.	(Netherlands) MVV Maastricht	Loan	
12 August 2022	(Spain) José Rodríguez	(Israel) Maccabi Haifa F.C.	Royale Union Saint-Gilloise	Undisclosed	
13 August 2022	David Hubert	SV Zulte Waregem	RSC Anderlecht	Undisclosed	
13 August 2022	Elias Spago	R.F.C. Seraing (1922)	RE Virton	Loan	
14 August 2022	(Senegal) Ibrahima Sy	(England) Stoke City FC	KVC Westerlo	Undisclosed	
16 August 2022	(Democratic Republic of the Congo) Jordan Botaka	KAA Gent	(Israel) Hapoel Jerusalem F.C.	Loan	
16 August 2022	Michael Davis	SK Beveren	R Antwerp FC	Loan	
16 August 2022	Romain Turco	KAS Eupen	URSL Visé	Free	
16 August 2022	(Spain) Sergio Gómez	RSC Anderlecht	(England) Manchester City	Undisclosed	
16 August 2022	(Ivory Coast) Kader Keïta	KVC Westerlo	(Turkey) Sivasspor	Undisclosed	
16 August 2022	(Germany) Timon Wellenreuther	RSC Anderlecht	(Netherlands) Feyenoord	Loan	
16 August 2022	(Tanzania) Mbwana Samatta	(Turkey) Fenerbahçe S.K.	KRC Genk	Loan	
16 August 2022	(Norway) Jens Petter Hauge	(Germany) Eintracht Frankfurt	KAA Gent	Loan	
17 August 2022	(France) Nathan Bitumazala	(France) Paris Saint-Germain F.C.	KAS Eupen	Undisclosed	
17 August 2022	(Ukraine) Valeriy Dubko	(Ukraine) FC Zorya Luhansk	FCV Dender EH	Free	
18 August 2022	(Uruguay) Felipe Avenatti	Standard Liège	KV Kortrijk	Free	
18 August 2022	(France) Jean-Luc Dompé	SV Zulte Waregem	(Germany) Hamburg SV	Undisclosed	
18 August 2022	(Colombia) Jhon Lucumí	KRC Genk	(Italy) Bologna F.C. 1909	Undisclosed	
19 August 2022	(Georgia (country)) Levan Shengelia	OH Leuven	(Greece) Panetolikos F.C.	Undisclosed	
19 August 2022	(France) Yann Gboho	(France) Stade Rennais F.C.	Cercle Brugge	Undisclosed	
19 August 2022	(Ghana) Abu Francis	(Denmark) FC Nordsjælland	Cercle Brugge	Undisclosed	
19 August 2022	(Japan) Shinji Okazaki	Free Agent	Sint-Truidense V.V.	Free	
19 August 2022	Joachim Van Damme	Standard Liège	SK Beveren	Loan	
19 August 2022	Anas Hamzaoui	Royale Union Saint-Gilloise	RAAL La Louvière	Free	
20 August 2022	(Poland) Aleksander Buksa	(Italy) Genoa C.F.C.	OH Leuven	Loan	
20 August 2022	(Croatia) Davor Matijaš	R Antwerp FC	K Beerschot VA	Undisclosed	
20 August 2022	(Senegal) Sambou Soumano	(France) FC Lorient	KAS Eupen	Loan	
20 August 2022	(Mexico) Teun Wilke	(Italy) S.P.A.L.	Cercle Brugge	Loan	
22 August 2022	(Japan) Satoshi Tanaka	(Japan) Shonan Bellmare	KV Kortrijk	Loan	
22 August 2022	Dedryck Boyata	(Germany) Hertha BSC	Club Brugge KV	Undisclosed	
22 August 2022	(Iran) Amirhossein Hosseinzadeh	(Iran) Esteghlal F.C.	RSC Charleroi	Undisclosed	
23 August 2022	Milan Troonbeeckx	Lommel SK	K.V.V. Thes Sport Tessenderlo	Loan	
23 August 2022	Dieter Reynders	Sint-Truidense V.V.	R. Olympic Charleroi	Free	
23 August 2022	(Israel) Osher Davida	(Israel) Hapoel Tel Aviv	Standard Liège	Undisclosed	
23 August 2022	(Ukraine) Oleksandr Yakymenko	(Ukraine) FC Shakhtar Donetsk	Club Brugge KV	Undisclosed	
23 August 2022	(France) Jean Marcelin	(France) AS Monaco FC	Cercle Brugge	Loan	
23 August 2022	(Turkey) Muhammed Gümüşkaya	(Turkey) Fenerbahçe S.K.	KVC Westerlo	Undisclosed	
23 August 2022	(Senegal) Birame Diaw	(Spain) Granada CF	Standard Liège	Undisclosed	
23 August 2022	(Cameroon) Didier Lamkel Zé	R Antwerp FC	KV Kortrijk	Undisclosed	
24 August 2022	(Spain) Mario González	(Portugal) S.C. Braga	OH Leuven	Loan	
24 August 2022	Ilyes Ziani	Royale Union Saint-Gilloise	Standard Liège	Loan	
25 August 2022	Senne Ceulemans	KV Mechelen	Royal Knokke F.C.	Loan	
25 August 2022	(Senegal) Moussa N'Diaye	(Spain) FC Barcelona	RSC Anderlecht	Undisclosed	
26 August 2022	(Ivory Coast) Fernand Gouré	KVC Westerlo	(Hungary) Újpest FC	Loan	
26 August 2022	(Democratic Republic of the Congo) Théo Bongonda	KRC Genk	(Spain) Cádiz CF	Undisclosed	
26 August 2022	(Mexico) Dagoberto Espinoza	(Mexico) Club América	Cercle Brugge	Loan	
28 August 2022	(Brazil) Ênio	(Brazil) Botafogo FR	RWDM47	Loan	
28 August 2022	(Brazil) Barreto	(Brazil) Botafogo FR	RWDM47	Loan	
28 August 2022	(Brazil) Juninho	(Brazil) Botafogo FR	RWDM47	Loan	
28 August 2022	(Brazil) Rikelmi	(Brazil) Botafogo FR	RWDM47	Loan	
28 August 2022	(Brazil) Luís Oyama	(Brazil) Botafogo FR	RWDM47	Loan	
28 August 2022	(Republic of Ireland) Jake O'Brien	(England) Crystal Palace F.C.	RWDM47	Loan	
28 August 2022	(England) Luke Plange	(England) Crystal Palace F.C.	RWDM47	Loan	
28 August 2022	(Nigeria) Raphael Onyedika	(Denmark) FC Midtjylland	Club Brugge KV	Undisclosed	
29 August 2022	(Ukraine) Roman Yaremchuk	(Portugal) SL Benfica	Club Brugge KV	Undisclosed	
29 August 2022	(United States) Moses Nyeman	(United States) DC United	SK Beveren	Undisclosed	
29 August 2022	(Turkey) Tiago Cukur	(Turkey) Fenerbahçe S.K.	FCV Dender EH	Loan	
29 August 2022	(Spain) Eric Monjonell	(Spain) Girona FC	Lommel SK	Loan	
29 August 2022	Stefano Marzo	(Netherlands) Roda JC	FCV Dender EH	Free	
30 August 2022	(Morocco) Anass Zaroury	RSC Charleroi	(England) Burnley FC	Undisclosed	
30 August 2022	Antoine Colassin	RSC Anderlecht	(Netherlands) SC Heerenveen	Loan	
30 August 2022	(Netherlands) Calvin Stengs	(France) OGC Nice	R Antwerp FC	Loan	
30 August 2022	(Senegal) Pathé Mboup	Standard Liège	(France) Olympique Lyonnais	Free	
31 August 2022	(Iran) Kaveh Rezaei	OH Leuven	(Iran) Tractor S.C.	Free	
31 August 2022	(Norway) Simen Juklerød	KRC Genk	(Norway) Vålerenga Fotball	Undisclosed	
31 August 2022	(Switzerland) Bastien Toma	KRC Genk	(Portugal) F.C. Paços de Ferreira	Loan	
31 August 2022	Dylan Dassy	KV Mechelen	(Netherlands) Helmond Sport	Loan	
31 August 2022	Chris Kalulika	KV Mechelen	(Netherlands) Helmond Sport	Loan	
31 August 2022	Laurens Symons	KV Mechelen	Royal Cappellen F.C.	Free	
31 August 2022	(France) Andrew Jung	KV Oostende	(France) FUS Quevilly-Rouen	Loan	
31 August 2022	(Senegal) Makhtar Gueye	KV Oostende	(Spain) Real Zaragoza	Loan	
31 August 2022	(Sweden) Kristoffer Olsson	RSC Anderlecht	(Denmark) FC Midtjylland	Loan	
31 August 2022	Mohamed Bouchouari	RSC Anderlecht	(Netherlands) FC Emmen	Loan	
31 August 2022	Evan Patoulidis	KV Oostende	(Netherlands) FC Den Bosch	Loan	
31 August 2022	(Guinea) Amadou Diawara	(Italy) AS Roma	RSC Anderlecht	Undisclosed	
31 August 2022	(Italy) Filippo Melegoni	(Italy) Genoa C.F.C.	Standard Liège	Loan	
1 September 2022	(Ukraine) Marian Shved	KV Mechelen	(Ukraine) FC Shakhtar Donetsk	Undisclosed	
1 September 2022	(Scotland) Jack Hendry	Club Brugge KV	(Italy) U.S. Cremonese	Loan	
1 September 2022	(Senegal) Abdoulaye Seck	R Antwerp FC	(Israel) Maccabi Haifa F.C.	Undisclosed	
1 September 2022	Pierre Dwomoh	R Antwerp FC	(Portugal) S.C. Braga	Loan	
1 September 2022	(England) Marcel Lewis	Royale Union Saint-Gilloise	(England) Burnley F.C.	Loan	
1 September 2022	(Sierra Leone) Mustapha Bundu	RSC Anderlecht	(Spain) FC Andorra	Loan	
1 September 2022	(Mali) Moussa Sissako	Standard Liège	(Russia) PFC Sochi	Free	
1 September 2022	(Senegal) Moustapha Mbow	(France) Stade de Reims	R.F.C. Seraing (1922)	Loan	
1 September 2022	(France) Abou Ba	(France) FC Nantes	R.F.C. Seraing (1922)	Loan	
1 September 2022	(France) Garissone Innocent	(France) Paris Saint-Germain F.C.	KAS Eupen	Undisclosed	
1 September 2022	(France) Paul Nardi	(France) FC Lorient	KAA Gent	Undisclosed	
1 September 2022	(Scotland) David Bates	(Scotland) Aberdeen F.C.	KV Mechelen	Undisclosed	
1 September 2022	(Lithuania) Nauris Petkevičius	RSC Charleroi	K Beerschot VA	Loan	
1 September 2022	(The Gambia) Wally Fofana	KVC Westerlo	R. Olympic Charleroi	Loan	
2 September 2022	(France) Yanis Castagne	RE Virton	Royal FC Mandel United	Free	
2 September 2022	(Brazil) William de Camargo	(Spain) CD Leganés	KMSK Deinze	Loan	
2 September 2022	(Kosovo) Liridon Balaj	(Switzerland) FC Aarau	KMSK Deinze	Free	
2 September 2022	(Ghana) Mubarak Wakaso	(China) Shenzhen F.C.	KAS Eupen	Loan	
2 September 2022	(Croatia) Stipe Perica	(Israel) Maccabi Tel Aviv F.C.	Standard Liège	Undisclosed	
2 September 2022	(Montenegro) Lazar Mijović	(Montenegro) FK Budućnost Podgorica	Lommel SK	Undisclosed	
2 September 2022	(Morocco) Sofian Kiyine	(Italy) SS Lazio	OH Leuven	Undisclosed	
2 September 2022	Jan Vertonghen	(Portugal) SL Benfica	RSC Anderlecht	Free	
2 September 2022	(Angola) Jonathan Buatu	Sint-Truidense V.V.	(France) Valenciennes FC	Free	
2 September 2022	(Israel) Eden Shamir	Standard Liège	(Israel) Hapoel Be'er Sheva F.C.	Undisclosed	
3 September 2022	(Scotland) Dapo Mebude	(England) Watford FC	KV Oostende	Undisclosed	
5 September 2022	Toon Raemaekers	KV Mechelen	Lierse Kempenzonen	Loan	
5 September 2022	Othman El Ouamari	RWDM47	SK Pepingen-Halle	Loan	
5 September 2022	(France) Samed Kılıç	(France) FC Chambly Oise	RE Virton	Undisclosed	
5 September 2022	(France) Nathan Fuakala	KMSK Deinze	Francs Borains	Loan	
6 September 2022	(France) Corenthyn Lavie	RWDM47	Francs Borains	Free	
6 September 2022	(France) Teddy Alloh	(France) Paris Saint-Germain F.C.	KAS Eupen	Loan	
6 September 2022	(Mauritania) Djeidi Gassama	(France) Paris Saint-Germain F.C.	KAS Eupen	Loan	
6 September 2022	(Brazil) Vinícius Lopes	(Brazil) Botafogo FR	RWDM47	Loan	
6 September 2022	(United States) Evan Rotundo	(Germany) FC Schalke 04	KRC Genk	Undisclosed	
6 September 2022	(United States) Marlon Fossey	(England) Fulham F.C.	Standard Liège	Undisclosed	
6 September 2022	(England) Yeboah Amankwah	(England) Manchester City F.C.	Lommel S.K.	Free	
6 September 2022	(Senegal) Alioune Ndour	(Norway) FK Haugesund	SV Zulte Waregem	Undisclosed	
6 September 2022	(Iceland) Nökkvi Þeyr Þórisson	(Iceland) Knattspyrnufélag Akureyrar	K Beerschot VA	Undisclosed	
6 September 2022	(Cape Verde) Vagner Gonçalves	(France) FC Metz	R.F.C. Seraing (1922)	Loan	
6 September 2022	(Estonia) Kevor Palumets	(Estonia) Paide Linnameeskond	SV Zulte Waregem	Undisclosed	
6 September 2022	(Nigeria) Chinonso Offor	(Canada) CF Montréal	SV Zulte Waregem	Loan	
6 September 2022	(Senegal) Pape Diop	(Senegal) Diambars FC	SV Zulte Waregem	Undisclosed	
6 September 2022	(Denmark) Philip Zinckernagel	(Greece) Olympiacos F.C.	Standard Liège	Loan	
6 September 2022	(Ukraine) Oleksiy Sych	(Ukraine) FC Rukh Lviv	KV Kortrijk	Loan	
6 September 2022	(Zimbabwe) Bill Antonio	(Zimbabwe) Dynamos F.C.	KV Mechelen	Undisclosed	
6 September 2022	(Burkina Faso) Alassane Zeba	(Burkina Faso) AC Tenakourou	KV Mechelen	Undisclosed	
6 September 2022	(Cameroon) Stève Mvoué	(France) Toulouse FC	R.F.C. Seraing (1922)	Undisclosed	
6 September 2022	(France) Mahamadou Dembélé	(France) ES Troyes AC	R.F.C. Seraing (1922)	Free	
6 September 2022	(Nigeria) Victory Beniangba	(Egypt) Ceramica Cleopatra FC	KRC Genk	Undisclosed	
6 September 2022	(Colombia) Steven Alzate	(England) Brighton & Hove Albion F.C.	Standard Liège	Loan	
6 September 2022	(Brazil) Lucas Mineiro	(Portugal) S.C. Braga	KVC Westerlo	Loan	
6 September 2022	(Bosnia and Herzegovina) Stjepan Lončar	(Hungary) Ferencvárosi TC	KV Kortrijk	Loan	
6 September 2022	Nacer Chadli	(Turkey) İstanbul Başakşehir F.K.	KVC Westerlo	Loan	
6 September 2022	Youssef Challouk	KV Kortrijk	RWDM47	Loan	
6 September 2022	Brent Gabriël	S.K. Beveren	FCV Dender EH	Loan	
6 September 2022	Birger Verstraete	R Antwerp FC	KV Mechelen	Loan	
6 September 2022	Alexis De Sart	R Antwerp FC	RWDM47	Loan	
6 September 2022	Jamal Aabbou	RE Virton	Royal Knokke F.C.	Loan	
6 September 2022	Steve De Ridder	Sint-Truidense V.V.	K.M.S.K. Deinze	Loan	
6 September 2022	(Serbia) Damjan Pavlović	Standard Liège	(Croatia) HNK Rijeka	Undisclosed	
8 September 2022	(Austria) Marko Kvasina	KV Oostende	(Turkey) Göztepe S.K.	Undisclosed	
