= 2022–23 RFC Seraing (1922) season =

R.F.C. Seraing
2022–23 season
- Chairman: Mario Franchi
- Manager: Jean-Sébastien Legros
- Stadium: Stade du Pairay
- Belgian Pro League: 18th (relegated)
- Belgian Cup: Seventh round

The 2022–23 R.F.C. Seraing season was the club's 101st season in existence and the second consecutive season in the top flight of Belgian football. In addition to the domestic league, Seraing participated in this season's edition of the Belgian Cup. The season covered the period from 1 July 2022 to 30 June 2023.

== Players ==
=== First-team squad ===
As of 3 February 2023

Note: Flags indicate national team as defined under FIFA eligibility rules; some limited exceptions apply. Players may hold more than one non-FIFA nationality.

No.	Pos.	Nation	Player
1	GK	BEL	Timothy Galjé
2	DF	GUI	Abdoulaye Sylla
3	DF	COD	John Nekadio
4	DF	FRA	Marvin Tshibuabua
5	MF	CMR	Stève Mvoué
6	MF	BEL	Mathieu Cachbach
7	FW	CPV	Vagner Gonçalves (on loan from Metz)
8	DF	FRA	Gerald Kilota
10	FW	CHA	Marius Mouandilmadji
12	MF	BEL	Antoine Bernier
14	MF	BEL	Valentin Guillaume
15	MF	BEL	Sami Lahssaini (on loan from Metz)
16	GK	LUX	Timothy Martin (on loan from Virton)
17	DF	FRA	Sandro Trémoulet

No.	Pos.	Nation	Player
18	DF	CGO	Morgan Poaty
20	MF	FRA	Abou Ba (on loan from Nantes)
21	DF	BEL	Fabrice Sambu
23	MF	BEL	Christophe Lepoint
25	DF	FRA	Mahamadou Dembélé
27	MF	FRA	Sambou Sissoko
29	FW	NGR	Ejaita Ifoni
30	GK	FRA	Guillaume Dietsch (on loan from Metz)
40	DF	GHA	Daniel Opare
52	FW	BEL	Noah Serwy
61	FW	ALG	Zakaria Silini
67	MF	BEL	Matteo Renzulli
99	DF	SEN	Moustapha Mbow (on loan from Reims)

== Transfers ==
=== In ===
Pos	Player	Transferred from	Fee	Date	Source
MF	Christophe Lepoint	Unattached	Free	3 June 2022	
MF	Valentin Guillaume	Virton	Free	20 June 2022	
DF	(France) Marvin Tshibuabua	(France) Saint-Étienne	Free	27 June 2022	
DF	(Portugal) Sérgio Conceição	(Portugal) Estrela da Amadora	Free	29 June 2022	
MF	(France) Sambou Sissoko	(France) Reims	Free	30 June 2022	
DF	(France) Sandro Trémoulet	Unattached	Free	6 July 2022	
FW	(France) Simon Elisor	(France) Ajaccio	Free	12 July 2022	
FW	(Nigeria) Ejaita Ifoni	(Mozambique) Black Bulls	Free	20 July 2022	
MF	Sami Lahssaini	(France) Metz	Loan	22 July 2022	
DF	(Guinea) Abdoulaye Sylla	(France) Nantes	Free	27 July 2022	
DF	(France) Leroy Abanda	(Italy) AC Milan	Free	28 July 2022	
GK	(Luxembourg) Timothy Martin	Virton	Loan	11 August 2022	
MF	(France) Abou Ba	(France) Nantes	Loan	1 September 2022	
DF	(Senegal) Moustapha Mbow	(France) Reims	Loan	1 September 2022	
FW	(Cape Verde) Vagner Gonçalves	(France) Metz	Loan	6 September 2022	
MF	(Cameroon) Stève Mvoué	(France) Toulouse	Free	7 September 2022	
DF	(France) Mahamadou Dembélé	(France) Troyes	Free	7 September 2022	
DF	(Democratic Republic of the Congo) John Nekadio	Standard Liège	Undisclosed	1 February 2023	

=== Out ===
Pos	Player	Transferred to	Fee	Date	Source
DF	(France) Benjamin Boulenger	Francs Borains	Undisclosed	31 May 2022	
DF	(Senegal) Wagane Faye	RAAL La Louvière	Free	20 June 2022	
GK	Maxime Mignon	Visé	Free	30 June 2022	
DF	Elias Spago	Virton	Loan	13 August 2022	
DF	François D'Onofrio	Retired		2 November 2022	
FW	(France) Simon Elisor	(France) Laval	Loan	5 January 2023	
DF	(France) Leroy Abanda	(Greece) Lamia	Loan	14 January 2023	
DF	(Portugal) Sérgio Conceição	(Portugal) Portimonense	Free	1 February 2023	

== Pre-season and friendlies ==
Win Draw Loss Fixtures

18 June 2022	Verlaine (Belgium)	1–2	(Belgium) Seraing	Verlaine, Belgium
18:00 CEST (UTC+2)	Mievis 84'	Report	Mouandilmadji 11' (pen.); Bernier 21'	Stadium: Stade des Six Bonniers

25 June 2022	Wiltz (Luxembourg)	1–2	(Belgium) Seraing	Weidingen, Luxembourg
17:00 CEST (UTC+2)	? (?)	Report	Mouandilmadji 13'; Bernier 27'	Stadium: Stade Am Pëtz

2 July 2022	Differdange (Luxembourg)	0–0	(Belgium) Seraing	Differdange, Luxembourg
18:00 CEST (UTC+2)		Report		Stadium: Stade Municipal de la Ville de Differdange

8 July 2022	Charleroi (Belgium)	1–2	(Belgium) Seraing	Tubize, Belgium
11:00 CEST (UTC+2)	De Nève 80'	Report	Guillaume 4'; Mouandilmadji 44'	Stadium: Centre National de Football Euro 2000

13 July 2022	Sint-Truiden (Belgium)	0–2	(Belgium) Seraing	Geel, Belgium
18:00 CEST (UTC+2)		Report	Mouandilmadji 19', 42'	Stadium: De Leunen

17 July 2022	Genk (Belgium)	4–0	(Belgium) Seraing	Genk, Belgium
14:00 CEST (UTC+2)	? 32'; John 35'; Paintsil 43'; Juklerød 45'	Report		Stadium: Cegeka Arena

== Competitions ==
=== Overview ===
Competition	First match	Last match	Starting round	Final position	Record							
Competition	First match	Last match	Starting round	Final position	Pld	W	D	L	GF	GA	GD	Win %
Belgian Pro League	23 July 2023	22 April 2023	Matchday 1	18th	34	5	5	24	28	68	−40	14.71
Belgian Cup	6 September 2022	20 December 2022	Fifth round	Seventh round	3	2	0	1	6	2	+4	66.67
Total					37	7	5	25	34	70	−36	18.92

Last updated: 15 August 2023
Source: Soccerway

=== Belgian Pro League ===
==== League table ====
Pos	Team	Pld	W	D	L	GF	GA	GD	Pts	Qualification or relegation
14	Kortrijk	34	8	7	19	37	61	−24	31	
15	Eupen	34	7	7	20	40	75	−35	28	
16	Oostende (R)	34	7	6	21	37	76	−39	27	Relegation to Challenger Pro League
17	Zulte Waregem (R)	34	6	9	19	50	78	−28	27	Relegation to Challenger Pro League
18	Seraing (R)	34	5	5	24	28	68	−40	20	Relegation to Challenger Pro League

Source: Jupiler Pro League (in Dutch), Soccerway
Rules for classification: 1) Points; 2) Matches won; 3) Goal difference; 4) Goals scored; 5) Away matches won; 6) Away goal difference; 7) Away goals scored; 8) Play-off.
(R) Relegated

==== Results summary ====
Overall								Home						Away					
Pld	W	D	L	GF	GA	GD	Pts	W	D	L	GF	GA	GD	W	D	L	GF	GA	GD
34	5	5	24	28	68	−40	20	1	4	12	8	29	−21	4	1	12	20	39	−19

Last updated: 15 August 2023.
Source: Jupiler Pro League

==== Results by round ====
Round	1	2	3	4	5	6	7	8	9	10	11	12	13	14	15	16	17	18	19	20	21	22	23	24	25	26	27	28	29	30	31	32	33	34
Ground	A	H	A	H	A	H	A	H	A	A	H	A	H	A	H	H	A	H	A	H	A	H	A	H	A	H	H	A	H	A	H	A	A	H
Result	L	L	L	L	W	L	W	L	L	W	D	D	L	L	L	L	L	L	W	D	L	L	L	W	L	D	L	L	L	L	L	L	L	D
Position	16	18	18	18	17	18	16	16	16	16	14	14	15	16	17	18	18	18	18	18	18	18	18	17	18	18	18	18	18	18	18	18	18	18

Updated to match(es) played on 22 April 2023. Source: Jupiler Pro League
A = Away; H = Home; W = Win; D = Draw; L = Loss

==== Matches ====
The league fixtures were announced on 22 June 2022.

23 July 2022 1	Zulte Waregem	2–0	Seraing	Waregem
18:15	Fadera 74'; López 87'	Report		Stadium: Elindus Arena; Referee: Bert Put

31 July 2022 2	Seraing	0–1	Kortrijk	Seraing
18:30		Report	Watanabe 58'	Stadium: Stade du Pairay; Referee: Jonathan Lardot

7 August 2022 3	Anderlecht	3–1	Seraing	Anderlecht
18:30	Amuzu 4', 16'; Silva 30'	Report	Sissoko 57'	Stadium: Lotto Park; Referee: Lawrence Visser

13 August 2022 4	Seraing	0–1	Charleroi	Seraing
18:15 CEST		Report	Tchatchoua 85'	Stadium: Stade du Pairay; Referee: Bram Van Driessche

19 August 2022 5	Eupen	1–3	Seraing	Eupen
20:45 CEST	Magnée 60'	Report	Mouandilmadji 5' (pen.), 36'; Bernier 39'	Stadium: Kehrwegstadion; Referee: Arthur Denil

27 August 2022 6	Seraing	0–4	Genk	Seraing
16:00 CEST		Report	Ndayishimiye 30', 66'; Paintsil 57'; Lepoint 68' (o.g.)	Stadium: Stade du Pairay; Attendance: 1,800; Referee: Jan Boterberg

3 September 2022 7	Mechelen	2–3	Seraing	Mechelen
18:15	Peyre 27'; Walsh 44'	Report	Thoelen 22' (o.g.); Mouandilmadji 71' (pen.), 81'	Stadium: Achter de Kazerne; Referee: Brent Staessens

10 September 2022 8	Seraing	0–2	Club Brugge	Seraing
18:15		Report	Larin 52'; Vanaken 69'	Stadium: Stade du Pairay; Referee: Wesli De Cremer

16 September 2022 9	Antwerp	2–1	Seraing	Antwerp
20:45	Alderweireld 7'; Janssen 20'	Report	Bernier 43'	Stadium: Bosuilstadion; Referee: Kevin Van Damme

30 September 2022 10	Standard Liège	0–2	Seraing	Liège
20:45		Report	Mbow 9'; Poaty 54'	Stadium: Stade Maurice Dufrasne; Referee: Jan Boterberg

8 October 2022 11	Seraing	1–1	Oostende	Seraing
18:15	Mouandilmadji 55' (pen.)	Report	Medley 90+1'	Stadium: Stade du Pairay; Referee: Arthur Denil

14 October 2022 12	Westerlo	2–2	Seraing	Westerlo
20:45	Poaty 28' (o.g.); Nene 33'	Report	Bernier 12'; Mouandilmadji 48'	Stadium: Het Kuipje; Referee: Nicolas Laforge

18 October 2022 13	Seraing	0–1	Cercle Brugge	Seraing
20:45 CEST		Report	Popović 25'	Stadium: Stade du Pairay; Referee: Nathan Verboomen

23 October 2022 14	Gent	2–1	Seraing	Ghent
16:00 CEST (UTC+2)	Mbow 5' (o.g.); Depoitre 84'	Report	Mouandilmadji 38' (pen.)	Stadium: Ghelamco Arena; Referee: Jasper Vergoote

30 October 2022 15	Seraing	1–2	Union SG	Seraing
16:00	Elisor 75'	Report	Vanzeir 47'; Teuma 72' (pen.)	Stadium: Stade du Pairay; Referee: Bert Put

5 November 2022 16	Seraing	1–2	Sint-Truiden	Seraing
18:15	Vagner 45+2'	Report	Hayashi 77'; Bruno 79'	Stadium: Stade du Pairay; Referee: Jan Boterberg

11 November 2022 17	OH Leuven	5–0	Seraing	Leuven
20:45	Maertens 23'; González 29' (pen.); De Norre 42'; Kiyine 45+2' (pen.); Nsingi 89'	Report		Stadium: Den Dreef; Referee: Kevin Van Damme

23 December 2022 18	Seraing	0–1	Eupen	Seraing
18:30 CEST		Report	Charles-Cook 88'	Stadium: Stade du Pairay; Referee: Jasper Vergoote

7 January 2023 19	Oostende	1–2	Seraing	Ostend
18:15	Bätzner 2'	Report	Mvoué 44'; Vagner 75'	Stadium: Diaz Arena; Referee: Nicolas Laforge

14 January 2023 20	Seraing	1–1	Standard Liège	Seraing
16:00	Balikwisha 17' (o.g.)	Report	Dønnum 41'	Stadium: Stade du Pairay; Referee: Bram Van Driessche

18 January 2023 21	Kortrijk	3–2	Seraing	Kortrijk
20:45	Avenatti 9'; Messaoudi 23'; Selemani 63'	Report	Vagner 18' (pen.), 60'	Stadium: Guldensporen Stadion; Referee: Brent Staessens

22 January 2023 22	Seraing	0–1	Anderlecht	Seraing
16:00		Report	Stroeykens 76'	Stadium: Stade du Pairay; Referee: Kevin Van Damme

29 January 2023 23	Genk	4–0	Seraing	Genk
22:00 CEST	Onuachu 7' (pen.), 60'; Ndayishimiye 14'; Paintsil 64'	Report		Stadium: Cegeka Arena; Referee: Wesli De Cremer

4 February 2023 24	Seraing	2–1	OH Leuven	Seraing
18:15	Poaty 4'; Lepoint 85'	Report	Ricca 37'	Stadium: Stade du Pairay; Referee: Erik Lambrechts

11 February 2023 25	Charleroi	3–0	Seraing	Charleroi
18:15 CEST	Bayo 18'; Bager 52'; Ilaimaharitra 61' (pen.)	Report		Stadium: Stade du Pays de Charleroi; Referee: Jonathan Lardot

18 February 2023 26	Seraing	1–1	Zulte Waregem	Seraing
18:15	Poaty 86'	Report	Vossen 43' (pen.)	Stadium: Stade du Pairay; Referee: Kevin Van Damme

25 February 2023 27	Seraing	0–2	Mechelen	Seraing
16:00		Report	Hairemans 35'; Da Cruz 55'	Stadium: Stade du Pairay; Referee: Lothar D'hondt

4 March 2023 28	Cercle Brugge	3–1	Seraing	Bruges
18:15 CEST	Siquet 31'; Ueda 32', 55'	Report	Mouandilmadji 3'	Stadium: Jan Breydel Stadium; Referee: Wim Smet

11 March 2023 29	Seraing	0–2	Antwerp	Seraing
20:45		Report	Ekkelenkamp 15'; Janssen 19'	Stadium: Stade du Pairay; Referee: Nicolas Laforge

18 March 2023 30	Sint-Truiden	2–1	Seraing	Sint-Truiden
18:15	Bruno 24', 83'	Report	Mouandilmadji 88'	Stadium: Stayen; Referee: Wesli De Cremer

1 April 2023 31	Seraing	0–5	Gent	Seraing
18:15 CEST (UTC+2)		Report	Orban 18', 52'; Cuypers 54', 77'; Torunarigha 62'	Stadium: Stade du Pairay; Referee: Alexandre Boucaut

7 April 2023 32	Club Brugge	2–0	Seraing	Bruges
20:45	Jutglà 56'; Nusa 90'	Report		Stadium: Jan Breydel Stadium; Referee: Wim Smet

16 April 2023 33	Union SG	2–1	Seraing	Forest
19:15	Adingra 17'; Vertessen 34'	Report	Mouandilmadji 47'	Stadium: Joseph Marien Stadium; Referee: Kevin Van Damme

22 April 2023 34	Seraing	1–1	Westerlo	Seraing
18:15	Mouandilmadji 8' (pen.)	Report	Vetokele 35'	Stadium: Stade du Pairay; Referee: Nicolas Laforge

=== Belgian Cup ===
6 September 2022 Fifth round	Sint-Eloois-Winkel	0–2	Seraing	Sint-Eloois-Winkel
19:30 CET		Report	Sambu 29'; Bernier 90'	Stadium: Sportpark Terschueren; Referee: Bart Zeebroek

8 November 2022 Sixth round	Seraing	4–1 (a.e.t.)	Charleroi	Seraing
19:30 CET	Sambu 79'; Vagner 105', 110'; Abanda 106'	Report	Heymans 16'	Stadium: Stade du Pairay; Referee: Simon Bourdeaud'hui

20 December 2022 Seventh round	Mechelen	1–0	Seraing	Mechelen
20:00 CET	Mrabti 57'	Report		Stadium: Achter de Kazerne; Referee: Alexandre Boucaut
