= 2022–23 KAA Gent season =

KAA Gent
2022–23 season
- Chairman: Ivan De Witte
- Managing director: Michel Louwagie
- Manager: Hein Vanhaezebrouck
- Stadium: Ghelamco Arena
- Pro League: 5th
- Belgian Cup: Quarter-finals
- Belgian Super Cup: Runners-up
- UEFA Europa League: Play-off round
- UEFA Europa Conference League: Quarter-finals
- Top goalscorer: League: Hugo Cuypers (27); All: Hugo Cuypers (34)
Home colours	Away colours	Third colours

The 2022–23 season was the 120th season in the history of KAA Gent and their 34th consecutive season in the top flight. The club participated in the Belgian Pro League, Belgian Cup, the UEFA Europa League, and the UEFA Europa Conference League.

== Players ==
As of 30 May 2023

Note: Flags indicate national team as defined under FIFA eligibility rules; some limited exceptions apply. Players may hold more than one non-FIFA nationality.

No.	Pos.	Nation	Player
1	GK	FRA	Paul Nardi
2	DF	KEN	Joseph Okumu
4	DF	POL	Kamil Piątkowski (on loan from Red Bull Salzburg)
7	MF	KOR	Hong Hyun-seok
8	MF	BEL	Vadis Odjidja-Ofoe (captain)
9	FW	SRB	Darko Lemajić
10	FW	NOR	Jens Petter Hauge (on loan from Eintracht Frankfurt)
11	FW	BEL	Hugo Cuypers
13	MF	BEL	Julien De Sart
14	MF	BEL	Alessio Castro-Montes
17	MF	DEN	Andrew Hjulsager
18	MF	BEL	Matisse Samoise
19	FW	BEL	Malick Fofana

No.	Pos.	Nation	Player
20	FW	NGR	Gift Orban
22	MF	GAM	Sulayman Marreh
23	DF	GER	Jordan Torunarigha
24	MF	BEL	Sven Kums (vice-captain)
25	DF	ANG	Núrio Fortuna
26	GK	BEL	Louis Fortin
29	FW	BEL	Laurent Depoitre
30	GK	BEL	Célestin De Schrevel
31	DF	BEL	Bruno Godeau
33	GK	BEL	Davy Roef
34	FW	MAR	Tarik Tissoudali
—	MF	AUS	Keegan Jelacic

=== Other players under contract ===
Note: Flags indicate national team as defined under FIFA eligibility rules; some limited exceptions apply. Players may hold more than one non-FIFA nationality.

No.	Pos.	Nation	Player
—	FW	CIV	Anderson Niangbo

=== Out on loan ===
Note: Flags indicate national team as defined under FIFA eligibility rules; some limited exceptions apply. Players may hold more than one non-FIFA nationality.

No.	Pos.	Nation	Player
—	MF	GEO	Giorgi Chakvetadze (at Slovan Bratislava until 30 June 2023)
—	FW	COD	Jordan Botaka (at Hapoel Jerusalem until 30 June 2023)

No.	Pos.	Nation	Player
—	FW	BEL	Gianni Bruno (at Sint-Truiden until 30 June 2023)

== Transfers ==
=== In ===
Pos	Player	Transferred from	Fee	Date	Source
FW	Hugo Cuypers	Mechelen	Undisclosed	14 June 2022	
MF	(South Korea) Hong Hyun-seok	(Austria) LASK	Undisclosed	8 August 2022	
FW	(Norway) Jens Petter Hauge	(Germany) Eintracht Frankfurt	Loan	16 August 2022	
GK	(France) Paul Nardi	(France) Lorient	Undisclosed	31 August 2022	
DF	(Poland) Kamil Piątkowski	(Austria) Red Bull Salzburg	Loan	17 January 2023	
FW	(Nigeria) Gift Orban	(Norway) Stabæk	Undisclosed	31 January 2023	
MF	(Australia) Keegan Jelacic	(Australia) Perth Glory	Undisclosed	30 May 2023	

=== Out ===
Pos	Player	Transferred to	Fee	Date	Source
FW	(Israel) Yonas Malede	Mechelen	Undisclosed	15 June 2022	
FW	(Ghana) Osman Bukari	(Serbia) Red Star Belgrade	Undisclosed	21 June 2022	
DF	(France) Christopher Opéri	Unattached	Mutual contract termination	21 June 2022	
MF	(Georgia (country)) Giorgi Chakvetadze	(Slovakia) Slovan Bratislava	Loan	4 July 2022	
MF	(Nigeria) Adewale Oladoye	(Slovakia) Trenčín	Undisclosed	6 July 2022	
FW	Gianni Bruno	Sint-Truiden	Loan	11 July 2022	
FW	(Democratic Republic of the Congo) Jordan Botaka	(Israel) Hapoel Jerusalem	Loan	15 August 2022	
DF	(Norway) Andreas Hanche-Olsen	(Germany) Mainz 05	Undisclosed	13 January 2023	
MF	(Ghana) Elisha Owusu	(France) Auxerre	Undisclosed	16 January 2023	
FW	(Morocco) Ibrahim Salah	(France) Rennes	Undisclosed	31 January 2023	
DF	(Cameroon) Michael Ngadeu-Ngadjui	(China) Beijing Guoan	Undisclosed	29 March 2023	

== Pre-season and friendlies ==
Win Draw Loss Fixtures

18 June 2022 Friendly	Dikkelvenne (Belgium)	0–6	(Belgium) Gent	Dikkelvenne, Belgium
18:30 CEST (UTC+2)		Report	Van Hauter 3'; Salah 12', 30'; Bruno 28', 45'; Kums 66'	Stadium: Sportcomplex Marc Gevaert

24 June 2022 Friendly	Westerlo (Belgium)	6–2	(Belgium) Gent	Westerlo, Belgium
11:30 CEST (UTC+2)	Seigers 37'; Foster 56'; Vaesen 73', 98', 107'; Bernát 114'	Report	Fofana 79'; Arthur 106'	Stadium: Het Kuipje
Note: Match was played over two halves of 60 minutes each

1 July 2022 Friendly	Hajduk Split (Croatia)	0–3	(Belgium) Gent	Friedberg, Austria
11:30 CEST (UTC+2)		Report	Cuypers 28'; Bruno 43', 49'	Stadium: Sportzentrum Friedberg

4 July 2022 Friendly	Aris Thessaloniki (Greece)	1–0	(Belgium) Gent	Söchau, Austria
15:00 CEST (UTC+2)	García 34' (pen.)	Report		Stadium: Kräuterdorfstadion Söchau

9 July 2022 Friendly	Gent (Belgium)	2–1	(Denmark) Midtjylland	Ghent, Belgium
19:30 CEST (UTC+2)	Castro-Montes 55' (pen.); Tissoudali 78'	Report	Onyedika 30'	Stadium: Ghelamco Arena

12 July 2022 Friendly	Gent (Belgium)	2–2	(Belgium) Beveren	Ghent, Belgium
11:00 CEST (UTC+2)		Report		Stadium: Ghelamco Arena; Attendance: 0

7 December 2022 Friendly	K.R.C. Gent (Belgium)	0–5	(Belgium) Gent	Oostakker, Belgium
19:00 CET (UTC+1)				Stadium: Chillax Arena

14 December 2022 Friendly	Gent (Belgium)	4–1	(Netherlands) Heerenveen	Oliva, Spain
14:00 CET (UTC+1)	Cuypers 41', 45+2'; Salah 50'; Fofana 89'	Report	Van Hooijdonk 48'	Stadium: Oliva Nova Golf & Beach Resort Campo 1

== Competitions ==
=== Overall record ===
Competition	First match	Last match	Starting round	Final position	Record							
Competition	First match	Last match	Starting round	Final position	Pld	W	D	L	GF	GA	GD	Win %
Pro League	22 July 2022	23 April 2023	Matchday 1	5th	34	16	8	10	64	38	+26	47.06
Pro League Play-off II	29 April 2023	3 June 2023	1st	1st	6	5	1	0	17	6	+11	83.33
Belgian Cup	9 November 2022	12 January 2023	Sixth round	Quarter-finals	3	2	0	1	7	4	+3	66.67
Belgian Super Cup	17 July 2022		Final	Runners-up	1	0	0	1	0	1	−1	0.00
UEFA Europa League	18 August 2022	25 August 2022	Play-off round	Play-off round	2	0	0	2	0	4	−4	0.00
UEFA Europa Conference League	8 September 2022	20 April 2023	Group stage	Quarter-finals	12	4	4	4	18	14	+4	33.33
Total					58	27	13	18	106	67	+39	46.55

Last updated: 5 June 2023
Source: Soccerway

=== Pro League ===
==== League table ====
Pos	Team	Pld	W	D	L	GF	GA	GD	Pts	Qualification or relegation
3	Antwerp (C)	34	22	6	6	59	26	+33	72	Qualification for the Play-offs I
4	Club Brugge	34	16	11	7	61	36	+25	59	Qualification for the Play-offs I
5	Gent (U)	34	16	8	10	64	38	+26	56	Qualification for the Play-offs II
6	Standard Liège	34	16	7	11	58	45	+13	55	Qualification for the Play-offs II
7	Westerlo	34	14	9	11	61	53	+8	51	Qualification for the Play-offs II

Source: Jupiler Pro League (in Dutch), Soccerway
Rules for classification: 1) Points; 2) Matches won; 3) Goal difference; 4) Goals scored; 5) Away matches won; 6) Away goal difference; 7) Away goals scored; 8) Play-off.
(C) Play-off I winner; (U) Play-off II winner

==== Results summary ====
Overall								Home						Away					
Pld	W	D	L	GF	GA	GD	Pts	W	D	L	GF	GA	GD	W	D	L	GF	GA	GD
34	16	8	10	64	38	+26	56	9	4	4	28	16	+12	7	4	6	36	22	+14

Last updated: 7 June 2023 2022.
Source: Jupiler Pro League

==== Results by round ====
Round	1	2	3	4	6	5	7	8	9	10	11	12	13	14	15	16	17	18	19	20	21	22	23	24	25	26	27	28	29	30	31	32	33	34
Ground	A	H	H	A	H	A	A	H	A	H	A	H	A	H	A	H	A	H	A	H	H	A	A	H	A	H	A	H	A	H	A	H	A	H
Result	D	D	W	W	L	W	L	W	L	L	W	W	L	W	D	W	W	D	L	W	D	W	L	L	D	W	L	W	W	W	W	D	D	L
Position																																		5

Updated to match(es) played on 23 April 2023. Source: Jupiler Pro League
A = Away; H = Home; W = Win; D = Draw; L = Loss

==== Matches ====
The league fixtures were announced on 22 June 2022.

22 July 2022 1	Standard Liège	2–2	Gent	Liège
20:45 CEST (UTC+2)	Amallah 34' (pen.); Dussenne 89'	Report	Tissoudali 60'; Lemajić 79'	Stadium: Stade Maurice Dufrasne; Attendance: 18,918; Referee: Lawrence Visser

29 July 2022 2	Gent	1–1	Sint-Truiden	Ghent
14:45 CEST (UTC+2)	Cuypers 12'	Report	Hayashi 82'	Stadium: Ghelamco Arena; Attendance: 9,500; Referee: Jasper Vergoote

7 August 2022 3	Gent	2–1	Westerlo	Ghent
16:00 CEST (UTC+2)	Marreh 37'; Cuypers 48'	Report	Vetokele 5'	Stadium: Ghelamco Arena; Attendance: 11,138; Referee: Wim Smet

12 August 2022 4	Oostende	1–3	Gent	Ostend
20:45 CEST (UTC+2)	Atanga 13'	Report	Cuypers 24'; Hong 29'; Hjulsager 60'	Stadium: Diaz Arena; Attendance: 4,568; Referee: Jonathan Lardot

28 August 2022 6	Gent	1–2	Antwerp	Ghent
13:30 CEST (UTC+2)	Kums 10'	Report	Janssen 15'; Frey 27' (pen.)	Stadium: Ghelamco Arena; Referee: Nicolas Laforge

1 September 2022 5	Anderlecht	0–1	Gent	Anderlecht
20:30 CEST (UTC+2)		Report	Cuypers 69' (pen.)	Stadium: Lotto Park; Referee: Erik Lambrechts
Note: Match was postponed due to the UEFA Europa League play-off round.

4 September 2022 7	Charleroi	2–1	Gent	Charleroi
18:30 CEST	Morioka 37'; Zorgane 73'	Report	Hong 22'	Stadium: Stade du Pays de Charleroi; Referee: Lothar D'hondt

11 September 2022 8	Gent	2–0	Zulte Waregem	Ghent
21:00 CEST (UTC+2)	Cuypers 49'; Torunarigha 72'	Report		Stadium: Ghelamco Arena; Referee: Jan Boterberg

18 September 2022 9	Genk	1–0	Gent	Genk
13:30 CEST	Heynen 90'	Report		Stadium: Cegeka Arena; Attendance: 15,185; Referee: Erik Lambrechts

2 October 2022 10	Gent	3–4	Cercle Brugge	Ghent
16:00 CEST	Cuypers 49', 68'; Depoitre 77'	Report	Denkey 24'; Hotić 59', 75', 89' (pen.)	Stadium: Ghelamco Arena; Referee: Wim Smet

9 October 2022 11	Eupen	0–4	Gent	Eupen
16:00 CEST		Report	Torunarigha 26' (pen.); Depoitre 40'; Hong 50', 64'	Stadium: Kehrwegstadion; Referee: Brent Staessens

16 October 2022 12	Gent	3–0	Mechelen	Ghent
16:00 CEST (UTC+2)	Samoise 35'; Fortuna 64'; Odjidja-Ofoe 72'	Report		Stadium: Ghelamco Arena; Referee: Jan Boterberg

19 October 2022 13	Union SG	2–0	Gent	Brussels
18:30 CEST (UTC+2)	Amani 12'; Vanzeir 82'	Report		Stadium: Joseph Marien Stadium; Referee: Jonathan Lardot

23 October 2022 14	Gent	2–1	Seraing	Ghent
16:00 CEST (UTC+2)	Mbow 5' (o.g.); Depoitre 84'	Report	Mouandilmadji 38' (pen.)	Stadium: Ghelamco Arena; Referee: Jasper Vergoote

30 October 2022 15	OH Leuven	1–1	Gent	Heverlee
18:30 CEST (UTC+2)	González 73' (pen.)	Report	Cuypers 42'	Stadium: Den Dreef; Referee: Lawrence Visser

6 November 2022 16	Gent	2–0	Club Brugge	Ghent
13:30 CEST (UTC+2)	Cuypers 9'; Ngadeu-Ngadjui 29'	Report		Stadium: Ghelamco Arena; Referee: Lothar D'hondt

13 November 2022 17	Kortrijk	0–4	Gent	Kortrijk
21:00 CEST (UTC+2)		Report	Hjulsager 33'; Salah 40', 71'; Depoitre 69'	Stadium: Guldensporen Stadion; Referee: Bert Put

23 December 2022 18	Gent	0–0	Standard Liège	Ghent
20:30 CEST (UTC+2)		Report		Stadium: Ghelamco Arena; Referee: Erik Lambrechts

7 January 2023 19	Antwerp	2–0	Gent	Antwerp
20:45 CEST (UTC+2)	Balikwisha 10'; Janssen 64' (pen.)	Report		Stadium: Bosuilstadion; Referee: Lothar D'hondt

15 January 2023 20	Gent	2–1	Kortrijk	Ghent
16:00 CEST (UTC+2)	Cuypers 7', 69'	Report	Bruno 74'	Stadium: Ghelamco Arena; Referee: Bert Put

19 January 2023 21	Gent	0–0	Charleroi	Ghent
18:30 CEST		Report		Stadium: Ghelamco Arena; Referee: Kevin Van Damme

22 January 2023 22	Sint-Truiden	0–3	Gent	Sint-Truiden
21:00 CEST (UTC+2)		Report	Salah 34'; Cuypers 44', 55'	Stadium: Stayen; Referee: Nathan Verboomen

29 January 2023 23	Cercle Brugge	3–2	Gent	Bruges
16:00 CEST	Ueda 58'; Denkey 59'; Daland 90+4'	Report	De Sart 66'; Lemajić 90'	Stadium: Jan Breydel Stadium; Referee: Nicolas Laforge

5 February 2023 24	Gent	2–3	Genk	Ghent
19:30 CEST	Hong 9'; Depoitre 88'	Report	Paintsil 23'; Sor 67'; Arokodare 86'	Stadium: Ghelamco Arena; Referee: Lawrence Visser

11 February 2023 25	Westerlo	3–3	Gent	Westerlo
16:00 CEST (UTC+2)	Cuypers 14' (pen.); Orban 30', 66'	Report	De Cuyper 16'; Chadli 35'; Van Eenoo 47'	Stadium: Het Kuipje; Referee: Kevin Van Damme

19 February 2023 26	Gent	2–0	OH Leuven	Ghent
16:00 CEST (UTC+2)	Cuypers 49'; Kums 73'	Report		Stadium: Ghelamco Arena; Referee: Bert Put

26 February 2023 27	Club Brugge	2–0	Gent	Bruges
13:30 CEST (UTC+2)	Meijer 73'; Vanaken 90+3'	Report		Stadium: Jan Breydel Stadium; Referee: Erik Lambrechts

5 March 2023 28	Gent	1–0	Anderlecht	Ghent
18:30 CEST (UTC+2)	Orban 57'	Report		Stadium: Ghelamco Arena; Referee: Lothar D'hondt

12 March 2023 29	Zulte Waregem	2–6	Gent	Waregem
16:00 CEST (UTC+2)	Derijck 52'; Vossen 65'	Report	De Sart 37'; Castro-Montes 41'; Orban 53', 68', 75', 83'	Stadium: Elindus Arena; Referee: Jonathan Lardot

19 March 2023 30	Gent	3–0	Eupen	Ghent
19:15 CEST	Cuypers 45+1'; Davidson 77' (o.g.); Okumu 85'	Report		Stadium: Ghelamco Arena; Referee: Lawrence Visser

1 April 2023 31	Seraing	0–5	Gent	Seraing
18:15 CEST (UTC+2)		Report	Orban 18', 52'; Cuypers 54', 77'; Torunarigha 62'	Stadium: Stade du Pairay; Referee: Alexandre Boucaut

8 April 2023 32	Gent	1–1	Union SG	Ghent
20:45 CEST (UTC+2)	Cuypers 80' (pen.)	Report	Amani 1'	Stadium: Ghelamco Arena; Referee: Jan Boterberg

16 April 2023 33	Mechelen	1–1	Gent	Mechelen
16:00 CEST (UTC+2)	Wouters 45'	Report	Samoise 42'	Stadium: Achter de Kazerne; Referee: Nicolas Laforge

23 April 2023 34	Gent	1–2	Oostende	Ghent
18:30 CEST (UTC+2)	Cuypers 77'	Report	Hornby 52'; Bätzner 88'	Stadium: Ghelamco Arena; Referee: Lawrence Visser

==== Play-offs II ====
Points obtained during the regular season were halved (and rounded up) before the start of the play-offs. Gent and Standard started on 28 points, Westerlo on 26, and Cercle Brugge on 25. As the points of Standard and Westerlo were rounded up, in case of ties they would always be ranked below the team (or teams) they are tied with. The deciding factor after that would be finishing position in the regular season.

Pos	Team	Pld	W	D	L	GF	GA	GD	Pts	Qualification or relegation	GNT	CER	STA	WES
1	Gent (F)	6	5	1	0	17	6	+11	44	Qualification for the Europa Conference League second qualifying round	—	2–2	3–1	3–1
2	Cercle Brugge	6	3	2	1	13	9	+4	36		0–4	—	0–0	2–0
3	Standard Liège	6	0	2	4	4	14	−10	30 (Note: Tied on Points and Points without half points added due to rounding. Regular Season finishing position: Standard Liège 6, Westerlo 7)		1–2	0–4	—	2–2
4	Westerlo	6	1	1	4	10	15	−5	30		1–3	3–5	3–0	—

Source: Jupiler Pro League (in Dutch), Soccerway
Legend: Blue = home team win; Yellow = draw; Red = away team win.
Rules for classification: 1) Points; 2) Points without (possible) half points added due to rounding; 3) Regular season finishing position.
(F) Play-off II winner
Notes:

28 April 2023 1	Gent	3–1	Westerlo	Ghent
20:45 CEST	Hong 52'; Kums 55'; Orban 88'	Report	Fixelles 27'	Stadium: Ghelamco Arena; Referee: Jasper Vergoote

6 May 2023 2	Standard Liège	1–2	Gent	Liège
20:45 CEST	Alzate 56'	Report	Orban 31'; Cuypers 61'	Stadium: Stade Maurice Dufrasne; Referee: Jan Boterberg

13 May 2023 3	Cercle Brugge	0–4	Gent	Bruges
18:15 CEST		Report	Cuypers 41'; Orban 51', 64', 67'	Stadium: Jan Breydel Stadium; Referee: Jonathan Lardot

20 May 2023 4	Gent	2–2	Cercle Brugge	Ghent
20:45 CEST	Orban 49'; Cuypers 85'	Report	Denkey 18'; Ueda 70' (pen.)	Stadium: Ghelamco Arena; Referee: Erik Lambrechts

27 May 2023 5	Westerlo	1–3	Gent	Westerlo
18:15 CEST	Chadli 23'	Report	Hjulsager 27'; Cuypers 75'; Tissoudali 81'	Stadium: Het Kuipje; Referee: Wesli De Cremer

3 June 2023 6	Gent	3–1	Standard Liège	Ghent
20:30 CEST	Cuypers 23', 43', 79' (pen.)	Report	Balikwisha 11'	Stadium: Ghelamco Arena; Referee: Lothar D'hondt

=== Belgian Cup ===
9 November 2022 Sixth round	Dessel Sport	0–5	Gent	Dessel
20:30 CET		Report	Hong 1', 20'; Van Daele 7'; Depoitre 24'; Hjulsager 48'	Stadium: Armand Melis Stadion; Referee: Kevin Debeuckelaere

20 December 2022 Seventh round	Gent	2–0 (a.e.t.)	Cercle Brugge	Ghent
20:00 CET	Cuypers 110'; Fofana 120'	Report		Stadium: Ghelamco Arena; Referee: Nicolas Laforge

12 January 2023 Quarter-final	Union SG	4–0	Gent	Brussels
20:45 CET	Nilsson 3'; Lazare 33', 90+2'; Boniface 40'	Report		Stadium: Joseph Marien Stadium; Referee: Jonathan Lardot

=== Belgian Super Cup ===
17 July 2022 Final	Club Brugge	1–0	Gent	Bruges
18:00 CEST (UTC+2)	Skov Olsen 39'	Report		Stadium: Jan Breydel Stadium; Attendance: 18,166; Referee: Erik Lambrechts

=== UEFA Europa League ===
==== Play-off round ====
The draw for the play-off round was held on 2 August 2022.

18 August 2022 First leg	Gent (Belgium)	0–2	(Cyprus) Omonia	Ghent, Belgium
--:-- EEST (UTC+3)		Report	Charalambous 19'; Barker 76'	Stadium: Ghelamco Arena; Attendance: 10,496; Referee: Irfan Peljto (Bosnia and Herzegovina)

25 August 2022 Second leg	Omonia (Cyprus)	2–0 (4–0 agg.)	(Belgium) Gent	Nicosia, Cyprus
--:-- CEST (UTC+2)	Kakoullis 18'; Charalambous 36'	Report		Stadium: GSP Stadium; Attendance: 17,002; Referee: Georgi Kabakov (Bulgaria)

=== UEFA Europa Conference League ===
==== Group stage ====
The draw for the group stage was held on 26 August 2022.

Pos	Team	Pld	W	D	L	GF	GA	GD	Pts	Qualification	DJU	GNT	MOL	SHR
1	(Sweden) Djurgårdens IF	6	5	1	0	12	6	+6	16	Advance to round of 16	—	4–2	3–2	1–0
2	(Belgium) Gent	6	2	2	2	10	6	+4	8	Advance to knockout round play-offs	0–1	—	4–0	3–0
3	(Norway) Molde	6	2	1	3	9	10	−1	7		2–3	0–0	—	3–0
4	(Republic of Ireland) Shamrock Rovers	6	0	2	4	1	10	−9	2		0–0	1–1	0–2	—

Source: UEFA
Rules for classification: Group stage tiebreakers

8 September 2022 1	Molde (Norway)	0–0	(Belgium) Gent	Molde, Norway
21:00 CEST (UTC+2)		Report		Stadium: Aker Stadion; Attendance: 4,158; Referee: Petri Viljanen (Finland)

15 September 2022 2	Gent (Belgium)	3–0	(Republic of Ireland) Shamrock Rovers	Ghent, Belgium
18:45 CEST (UTC+2)	Cuypers 9'; Odjidja-Ofoe 18', 65'	Report		Stadium: Ghelamco Arena; Attendance: 7,813; Referee: Visar Kastrati (Kosovo)

6 October 2022 3	Gent (Belgium)	0–1	(Sweden) Djurgårdens IF	Ghent, Belgium
21:00 CEST (UTC+2)		Report	Danielson 37'	Stadium: Ghelamco Arena; Attendance: 10,896; Referee: Aleksei Kulbakov (Belarus)

13 October 2022 4	Djurgårdens IF (Sweden)	4–2	(Belgium) Gent	Stockholm, Sweden
18:45 CEST (UTC+2)	Holmberg 21'; Wikheim 42', 46'; Banda 45+4'	Report	Depoitre 61'; Cuypers 73'	Stadium: Tele2 Arena; Attendance: 16,822; Referee: Manfredas Lukjančukas (Lithuania)

27 October 2022 5	Shamrock Rovers (Republic of Ireland)	1–1	(Belgium) Gent	Dublin, Republic of Ireland
20:00 IST (UTC+1)	Gaffney 3'	Report	Hong 74'	Stadium: Tallaght Stadium; Attendance: 6,203; Referee: Julian Weinberger (Austria)

3 November 2022 6	Gent (Belgium)	4–0	(Norway) Molde	Ghent, Belgium
18:45 CET (UTC+1)	Hjulsager 52'; Godeau 62'; Kums 80'; Cuypers 89' (pen.)	Report		Stadium: Ghelamco Arena; Attendance: 12,000; Referee: Sebastian Gishamer (Austria)

==== Knockout round play-off ====
16 February 2023 First leg	Qarabağ (Azerbaijan)	1–0	(Belgium) Gent	Baku, Azerbaijan
21:45 AZT (UTC+4)	Andrade 78'	Report		Stadium: Tofiq Bahramov Republican Stadium; Attendance: 25,452; Referee: Mohammed Al-Hakim (Sweden)

24 February 2023 Second leg	Gent (Belgium)	1–0 (a.e.t.) (1–1 agg.) (5–3 p)	(Azerbaijan) Qarabağ	Ghent, Belgium
21:00 CET (UTC+1)	Orban 74'	Report		Stadium: Ghelamco Arena; Attendance: 11,724; Referee: Willie Collum (Scotland)
	Penalties
	De Sart (penalty scored); Cuypers (penalty scored); Orban (penalty scored); Marreh (penalty scored); Van Daele (penalty scored)		(penalty scored) Richard; (penalty scored) Diakhaby; (penalty scored) Bayramov; (penalty missed) Benzia
Note: 1–1 on aggregate. Gent won 5–3 on penalties

==== Round of 16 ====
9 March 2023 First leg	Gent (Belgium)	1–1	(Turkey) İstanbul Başakşehir	Ghent, Belgium
	Orban 35'	Report	Okaka 16'	Stadium: Ghelamco Arena; Attendance: 11,334; Referee: Kristo Tohver (Estonia)

15 March 2023 Second leg	İstanbul Başakşehir (Turkey)	1–4 (2–5 agg.)	(Belgium) Gent	Istanbul, Turkey
	Januzaj 88'	Report	Orban 31', 32', 34'; Cuypers 37'	Stadium: Başakşehir Fatih Terim Stadium; Attendance: 8,216; Referee: Benoît Bastien (France)
Note: Gent won 5–2 on aggregate

==== Quarter-finals ====
13 April 2023 First leg	Gent (Belgium)	1–1	(England) West Ham United	Ghent, Belgium
	Cuypers 57'	Report	Ings 45+3'	Stadium: Ghelamco Arena; Attendance: 19,037; Referee: Anastasios Sidiropoulos (Greece)

20 April 2023 Second leg	West Ham United (England)	4–1 (5–2 agg.)	(Belgium) Gent	London, England
	Antonio 37', 63'; Paquetá 55' (pen.); Rice 58'	Report	Cuypers 26'	Stadium: London Stadium; Attendance: 53,475; Referee: Orel Grinfeld (Israel)
Note: West Ham United won 5–2 on aggregate

== Statistics ==
=== Squad appearances and goals ===
Last updated on 3 June 2023

No.	Pos	Nat	Player	Total		Belgian Division		Belgian Cup		Belgian Super Cup		UEFA Europa League		UEFA Europa Conference League	
No.	Pos	Nat	Player	Apps	Goals	Apps	Goals	Apps	Goals	Apps	Goals	Apps	Goals	Apps	Goals
Goalkeepers
1	GK	(France) FRA	Paul Nardi	37	0	30	0	2	0	0	0	0	0	5	0
26	GK	(Belgium) BEL	Louis Fortin	0	0	0	0	0	0	0	0	0	0	0	0
30	GK	(Belgium) BEL	Célestin De Schrevel	0	0	0	0	0	0	0	0	0	0	0	0
33	GK	(Belgium) BEL	Davy Roef	22	0	10+1	0	1	0	1	0	2	0	7	0
Defenders
2	DF	(Kenya) KEN	Joseph Okumu	42	1	29+1	1	0	0	1	0	1+1	0	8+1	0
4	DF	(Poland) POL	Kamil Piątkowski	21	0	16+1	0	0	0	0	0	0	0	4	0
15	DF	(Belgium) BEL	Bram Lagae	3	0	0+3	0	0	0	0	0	0	0	0	0
23	DF	(Germany) GER	Jordan Torunarigha	45	3	33+1	3	1	0	0	0	2	0	8	0
25	DF	(Angola) ANG	Núrio Fortuna	29	1	11+5	1	1	0	1	0	1	0	3+7	0
31	DF	(Belgium) BEL	Bruno Godeau	27	1	4+11	0	2+1	0	0	0	1+1	0	4+3	1
35	DF	(Belgium) BEL	Cederick Van Daele	3	1	0+1	0	1	1	0	0	0	0	0+1	0
38	DF	(Senegal) SEN	Brian Agbor	3	0	0+3	0	0	0	0	0	0	0	0	0
Midfielders
7	MF	(South Korea) KOR	Hong Hyun-seok	54	9	34+3	6	3	2	0	0	2	0	11+1	1
8	MF	(Belgium) BEL	Vadis Odjidja-Ofoe	44	3	19+10	1	2+1	0	0	0	1+1	0	6+4	2
12	MF	(Belgium) BEL	Noah De Ridder	1	0	0+1	0	0	0	0	0	0	0	0	0
13	MF	(Belgium) BEL	Julien De Sart	39	2	22+5	2	2+1	0	0	0	0	0	6+3	0
14	MF	(Belgium) BEL	Alessio Castro-Montes	46	0	22+9	0	2+1	0	1	0	2	0	9	0
17	MF	(Denmark) DEN	Andrew Hjulsager	35	5	17+7	3	0+2	1	1	0	1+1	0	3+3	1
18	MF	(Belgium) BEL	Matisse Samoise	47	2	31+2	2	2	0	1	0	1+1	0	6+3	0
22	MF	(The Gambia) GAM	Sulayman Marreh	17	1	5+6	1	0+1	0	0	0	0+1	0	1+3	0
24	MF	(Belgium) BEL	Sven Kums	53	4	37+1	3	1	0	1	0	2	0	10+1	1
27	MF	(Belgium) BEL	Rune Van Den Bergh	4	0	0+3	0	0	0	0	0	0	0	0+1	0
Forwards
9	FW	(Serbia) SRB	Darko Lemajić	11	2	1+7	2	0	0	0+1	0	0+1	0	0+1	0
10	FW	(Norway) NOR	Jens Petter Hauge	29	0	1+18	0	1+1	0	0	0	1+1	0	3+3	0
11	FW	(Belgium) BEL	Hugo Cuypers	55	34	37+2	27	0+2	1	1	0	2	0	10+1	6
19	FW	(Belgium) BEL	Malick Fofana	33	1	8+14	0	2+1	1	0+1	0	0	0	4+3	0
20	FW	(Nigeria) NGR	Gift Orban	22	20	14+2	15	0	0	0	0	0	0	5+1	5
29	FW	(Belgium) BEL	Laurent Depoitre	44	7	7+21	5	2+1	1	0	0	1+1	0	5+6	1
34	FW	(Morocco) MAR	Tarik Tissoudali	15	2	4+8	2	0	0	1	0	0	0	0+2	0
39	FW	(Belgium) BEL	Matias Fernandez-Pardo	2	0	0+1	0	0	0	0	0	0	0	0+1	0
Players who have made an appearance this season but have left the club
5	DF	(Senegal) SEN	Michael Ngadeu-Ngadjui	45	1	30	1	3	0	1	0	2	0	9	0
6	MF	(Ghana) GHA	Elisha Owusu	15	0	6+3	0	1+1	0	0	0	0	0	1+3	0
16	FW	(Morocco) MAR	Ibrahim Salah	21	3	8+6	3	1+2	0	0	0	0	0	2+2	0
21	DF	(Norway) NOR	Andreas Hanche-Olsen	13	0	4+4	0	0	0	1	0	1+1	0	2	0
