= Pape M'Bow =

Senegalese footballer

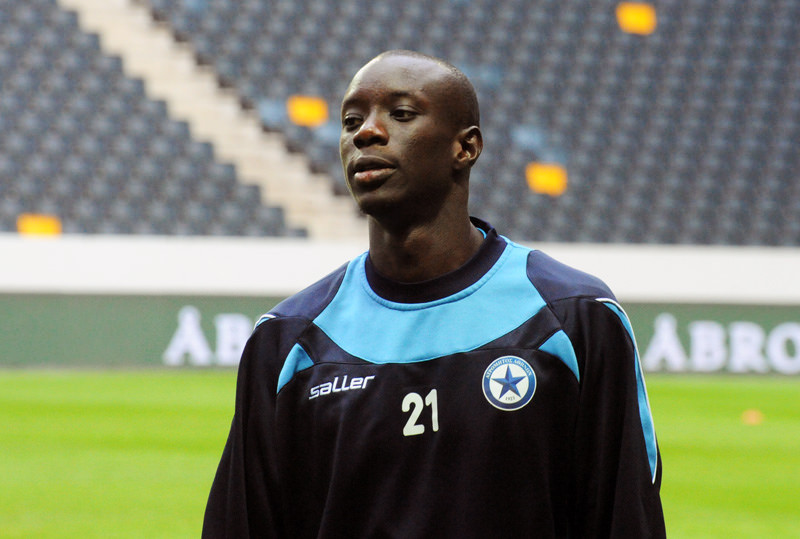
- M'Bow with Atromitos in July 2015

Personal information
- Full name: Pape Daouda M'Bow
- Date of birth: 22 May 1988 (age 38)
- Place of birth: Guédiawaye, Senegal
- Height: 1.91 m (6 ft 3 in)
- Position: Defender

Team information
- Current team: Reims Sainte-Anne

Youth career
- Marseille

Senior career*
Years	Team	Apps	(Gls)
2007–2009	Marseille B	16	(0)
2008–2013	Marseille	4	(0)
2009	→ Cannes (loan)	11	(0)
2010	→ Ajaccio (loan)	2	(0)
2011	→ Cannes (loan)	13	(2)
2011–2012	→ Mons (loan)	3	(0)
2013	→ Amiens (loan)	16	(1)
2013–2015	Panthrakikos	59	(2)
2015–2016	Atromitos	1	(0)
2016–2018	Créteil	23	(1)
2017–2018	Créteil B	10	(0)
2018–2019	Virton	23	(0)
2019–2020	Le Puy	7	(0)
2019–2020	Le Puy B	3	(0)
2020–2021	Reims Sainte-Anne	0	(0)

International career
2007–2009	Senegal U23	8	(0)
- * Club domestic league appearances and goals

Pape Daouda M'Bow (born 22 May 1988) is a Senegalese former professional footballer who played as a defender.

== Career ==
M'Bow was born in Guédiawaye, Senegal. He made his debut for Marseille on 13 January 2008 against Rennes, coming on as a 71st-minute substitute for Mathieu Valbuena. On 31 January, he was loaned out to Cannes for the rest of the season. On 21 September 2009, the defender signed his first professional contract, running until June 2012.

== Personal life ==
M'Bow's brothers Moustapha and Moussa are also professional footballers.
