= Malick Fofana =

Belgian footballer (born 2005)

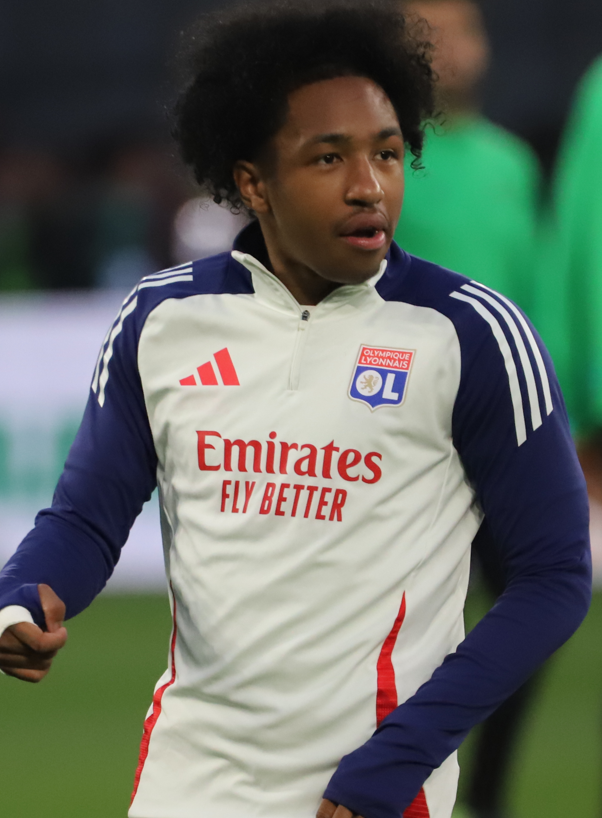
- Fofana with Lyon in 2025

Personal information
- Full name: Malick Martin Fofana
- Date of birth: 31 March 2005 (age 21)
- Place of birth: Aalst, Belgium
- Height: 1.69 m (5 ft 7 in)
- Position: Winger

Team information
- Current team: Sunderland
- Number: 39

Youth career
- 2009–2014: Eendracht Aalst
- 2014–2022: Gent

Senior career*
Years	Team	Apps	(Gls)
2022–2023	Jong Gent	13	(4)
2022–2024	Gent	41	(2)
2024–2026	Lyon	60	(11)
2026–	Sunderland	5	(0)

International career^{‡}
2020	Belgium U15	3	(0)
2021–2022	Belgium U17	10	(5)
2022–2023	Belgium U18	6	(2)
2022	Belgium U20	1	(0)
2023–	Belgium U21	11	(0)
2024–	Belgium	6	(1)
- * Club domestic league appearances and goals as of 17:03, 31 October 2026 (UTC) ‡ National team caps and goals as of 15:28, 18 November 2026 (UTC)

Malick Martin Fofana (born 31 March 2005) is a Belgian professional footballer who plays as a winger for Premier League club Sunderland and the Belgium national team.

== Club career ==
=== Gent ===
Fofana started playing football at Eendracht Aalst before joining Gent's youth academy at the age of nine. He signed his first professional contract there in January 2022.

After he already participated in the pre-season friendlies, Fofana made his professional debut for Gent on the 30 July 2022, replacing Hugo Cuypers during a 1–1 home Division A draw against Sint-Truiden. Only one week later, he was awarded his first start against Westerlo, leading his team to a 2–1 home victory.

=== Lyon ===
On 10 January 2024, Fofana joined Ligue 1 side Lyon for a fee of €17 million, plus €5 million in add-ons, and a 20% sell-on clause on a future sale in favor of Gent; he signed a contract until June 2028 with the French club. In the process, he became the third Belgian player in the history of Lyon, following Éric Deflandre and Jason Denayer.

=== Sunderland ===
On 1 September 2026, Fofana signed a long-term contract with Premier League side Sunderland. The transfer fee was reportedly £25.7m.

== International career ==
Fofana is a youth international for Belgium, having first established himself as a regular goalscorer with the under-17 national team, with whom he played the 2022 UEFA European Under-17 Championship.

In October 2024, Fofana received his first call-up to the senior Belgium national team for their 2024–25 UEFA Nations League matches against Italy and France. He debuted against the former opponent on 14 October.

== Personal life ==
Born in Belgium, Fofana is of Guinean, French and Filipino descent. Fofana holds Guinean and French nationalities from his parents.

== Career statistics ==
=== Club ===
As of match played 31 October 2026

Appearances and goals by club, season and competition
Club	Season	League			National cup (Note: Includes Belgian Cup, Coupe de France)		League cup (Note: Includes EFL Cup)		Europe		Other		Total	
Club	Season	Division	Apps	Goals	Apps	Goals	Apps	Goals	Apps	Goals	Apps	Goals	Apps	Goals
Jong Gent	2022–23	Belgian Division 1	13	4	—		—		—		—		13	4
Gent	2022–23	Belgian Pro League	22	0	3	1	—		7 (Note: Appearances in UEFA Europa Conference League)	0	1 (Note: Appearance in Belgian Super Cup)	0	33	1
Gent	2023–24	Belgian Pro League	19	2	2	0	—		10	2	—		31	4
Gent	Total		41	2	5	1	—		17	2	1	0	64	5
Lyon	2023–24	Ligue 1	17	3	4	1	—		—		—		21	4
Lyon	2024–25	Ligue 1	29	5	2	0	—		10 (Note: Appearances in UEFA Europa League)	6	—		41	11
Lyon	2025–26	Ligue 1	12	2	0	0	—		4	0	—		16	2
Lyon	2026–27	Ligue 1	2	1	—		—		4 (Note: Appearances in UEFA Champions League)	1	—		6	2
Lyon	Total		60	11	6	1	—		18	7	—		83	19
Sunderland	2026–27	Premier League	5	0	0	0	2	1	3	0	—		10	1
Career total			119	17	11	2	2	1	38	9	1	0	171	29

=== International ===
As of match played 2 October 2026

Appearances and goals by national team and year
National team	Year	Apps	Goals
Belgium	2024	1	0
Belgium	2025	4	1
Belgium	2026	1	0
Total		6	1

Scores and results list Belgium's goal tally first, score column indicates score after each Fofana goal.

List of international goals scored by Malick Fofana
No.	Date	Venue	Cap	Opponent	Score	Result	Competition
1	4 September 2025	Rheinpark Stadion, Vaduz, Liechtenstein	2	Liechtenstein	6–0	6–0	2026 FIFA World Cup qualification

== Honours ==
Lyon

- Coupe de France runner-up: 2023–24
