= Marsoni Sambu =

Angolan footballer

Personal information
- Full name: Junior Fabrice Marsoni Sambu Mansoni
- Date of birth: 3 June 1996 (age 30)
- Place of birth: Liège, Belgium
- Height: 1.81 m (5 ft 11 in)
- Position: Right-back

Team information
- Current team: Dender EH
- Number: 70

Senior career*
Years	Team	Apps	(Gls)
2013–2015	CS Visé	27	(6)
2015–2019	Seraing	87	(5)
2019–2020	URSL Visé	22	(4)
2020–2021	Cholet	26	(1)
2021–2023	Seraing	59	(1)
2023–2025	RWD Molenbeek	45	(2)
2025–	Dender EH	29	(0)

International career^{‡}
2024–	Angola	4	(0)
Medal record
Men's football
Representing Angola
COSAFA Cup
Winner	2024 South Africa
- * Club domestic league appearances and goals as of 11 May 2026 ‡ National team caps and goals as of 22:27, 26 September 2026 (UTC)

Junior Fabrice Marsoni Sambu Mansoni (born 3 June 1996) is a professional footballer who plays as a right-back for Belgian Pro League club Dender EH. Born in Belgium, he plays for the Angola national team.

== Career ==
Having played for CS Visé between 2013 and 2015, Sambu joined Seraing on a two-year contract on 23 April 2015. He joined URSL Visé on 30 August 2019, on a one-year contract with an option for an extra year. On 26 June 2020, Sambu moved to France, at Cholet.

On 24 June 2021, Sambu returned to Seraing.

On 23 August 2023, Sambu signed a two-year contract with RWD Molenbeek.

On 7 September 2025, Sambu moved to Dender EH on a two-season deal.

== International career ==
Born in Belgium, Marsoni Sambu is of Congolese and Angolan descent. He was called up to the Angola national team for the 2024 COSAFA Cup in June 2024.

== Honours ==
Angola

- COSAFA Cup: 2024
