= Morgan Poaty =

Congolese footballer (born 1997)

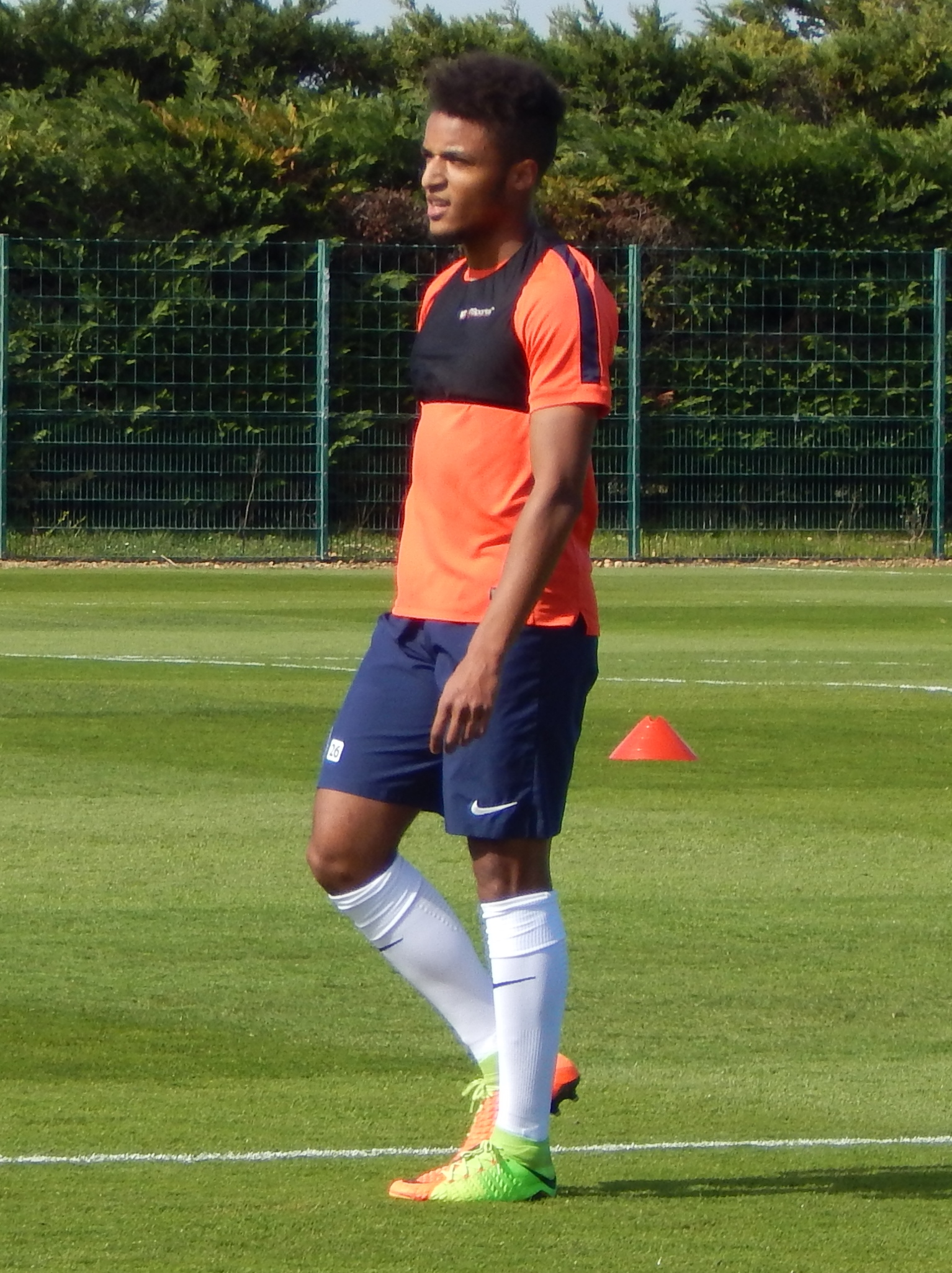
- Poaty training with Montpellier in 2017

Personal information
- Full name: Morgan Paul Poaty
- Date of birth: 15 July 1997 (age 29)
- Place of birth: Rodez, France
- Height: 1.75 m (5 ft 9 in)
- Position: Left-back

Team information
- Current team: Lausanne-Sport
- Number: 18

Youth career
- 2003–2009: US Espalionnaise
- 2009–2012: Rodez
- 2012–2016: Montpellier

Senior career*
Years	Team	Apps	(Gls)
2014–2016	Montpellier B	68	(0)
2016–2019	Montpellier	7	(0)
2018–2019	→ Troyes (loan)	15	(0)
2019–2020	Guingamp B	4	(0)
2019–2021	Guingamp	20	(0)
2021–2023	Seraing	63	(3)
2023–	Lausanne-Sport	109	(3)

International career^{‡}
2013	France U16	8	(0)
2021–2023	Congo	5	(0)
- * Club domestic league appearances and goals as of 28 September 2026 ‡ National team caps and goals as of 13 December 2023

Morgan Paul Poaty (born 15 July 1997) is a professional footballer who plays as a left-back for Swiss club Lausanne-Sport. Born in France, he played for the Congo national team.

== Club career ==
In September 2018, Poaty joined Ligue 2 side Troyes on a season-long loan from Montpellier.

In July 2021, Poaty signed for Belgian club Seraing on a two-year contract with an option for a third year.

On 22 August 2023, Poaty signed a two-year contract with Lausanne-Sport in Switzerland.

== International career ==
Poaty was born in France to a Congolese mother and French father. He is a youth international for France. He debuted with the Congo national team in a 1–1 2022 FIFA World Cup qualification tie with Togo on 9 October 2021.
