= Othman El Ouamari =

Belgian footballer

Personal information
- Date of birth: 27 October 2003 (age 23)
- Place of birth: Tubize, Belgium
- Position: Winger

Team information
- Current team: Tubize-Braine
- Number: 46

Youth career
- 2008–2017: Tubize-Braine
- 2017–2020: Standard
- 2020–2021: RWDM

Senior career*
| Years | Team | Apps | (Gls) |
| 2021–2023 | RWDM | 1 | (0) |
| 2023- | Tubize-Braine | | |
- * Club domestic league appearances and goals as of 29 January 2022

Othman El Ouamari (born 27 October 2003) is a Belgian professional footballer who plays for Tubize-Braine.

== Club career ==
Having started his career at Tubize as 4 years old, Othman El Ouamari joined the Standard de Liège academy as an under-15 before eventually choosing to leave for the Racing White Daring de Molenbeek as an under-18, to try to get to senior football more quickly.

Having made his first team debut during the pre-season and signed his first professional contract with the club from Molenbeek in December 2021, El Ouamari made his professional debut for RWDM47 on the 25 January 2022, replacing William Togui during a 2–0 1B Pro League loss against Westerlo.
