= Daniel Labila =

Congolese footballer (born 2003)

Personal information
- Full name: Daniel Labila Eyumpel
- Date of birth: 30 April 2003 (age 23)
- Place of birth: Kinshasa, DR Congo
- Height: 1.77 m (5 ft 10 in)
- Position: Winger

Youth career
- 2013–2016: Créteil
- 2016–2021: Paris Saint-Germain
- 2021–2022: Standard Liège

Senior career*
Years	Team	Apps	(Gls)
2022–2026	TSG Hoffenheim II	0	(0)
2022–2024	→ Académico de Viseu (loan)	17	(0)
- * Club domestic league appearances and goals as of 17 May 2026

Daniel Labila Eyumpel (born 30 April 2003) is a Congolese professional footballer who plays as a winger.

== Career ==
=== Youth career ===
Labila is a youth product of Paris Saint-Germain (PSG), having played in the academy of the club from 2016 to 2021. He had previously played for youth teams of Créteil. In the 2019–20 season with the under-17 squad of PSG, Labila scored 19 league goals. In April 2021, it was reported that Labila had rejected a professional contract at Paris Saint-Germain, with his “aspiring” youth contract coming to an end in June.

On 21 July 2021, Labila signed for Belgian club Standard Liège. He joined the under-21 reserve side of the club. PSG retained a percentage to a future sale of Labila.

=== TSG Hoffenheim ===
On 26 July 2022, TSG Hoffenheim announced that Labila had joined the club. To release him from his contract, Standard Liège was promised a percentage to a future sale.

==== Loan to Académico de Viseu ====
Following his arrival at Hoffenheim, Labila was immediately loaned out to Liga Portugal 2 club Académico de Viseu for the 2022–23 season. On 9 November 2022, he made his debut for the club in a 3–0 Taça de Portugal victory over Camacha, and scored the final goal of the match. On 16 January 2023, Labila made his league debut for Académico de Viseu as a late-match substitute in a 1–1 draw against Feirense.

== Career statistics ==
As of match played 6 January 2024

Appearances and goals by club, season and competition
Club	Season	League			National cup		League cup		Total	
Club	Season	Division	Apps	Goals	Apps	Goals	Apps	Goals	Apps	Goals
Académico de Viseu (loan)	2022–23	Liga Portugal 2	4	0	2	1	0	0	6	1
Académico de Viseu (loan)	2023–24	Liga Portugal 2	13	0	0	0	1	0	14	0
Career total			17	0	2	1	1	0	20	1
