= Moustapha Mbow =

Senegalese footballer (born 2000)

Personal information
- Full name: Mamadou Moustapha Mbow
- Date of birth: 8 March 2000 (age 26)
- Place of birth: Guédiawaye, Senegal
- Height: 1.92 m (6 ft 4 in)
- Position: Centre-back

Team information
- Current team: Paris FC
- Number: 5

Youth career
- Birane Ly
- 2011–2019: Darou Salam

Senior career*
Years	Team	Apps	(Gls)
2019–2021	Reims B	12	(0)
2021–2023	Reims	1	(0)
2022	→ Nîmes (loan)	12	(0)
2022	→ Nîmes B (loan)	1	(0)
2022–2023	→ Seraing (loan)	25	(1)
2023–	Paris FC	101	(2)

International career^{‡}
2019	Senegal U20	3	(0)
2026–	Senegal	1	(0)
- * Club domestic league appearances and goals as of 19 May 2026 ‡ National team caps and goals as of 31 May 2026

Mamadou Moustapha Mbow (born 8 March 2000) is a Senegalese professional footballer who plays as a centre-back for Ligue 1 club Paris FC and the Senegal national team.

== Club career ==
Mbow began playing football with the Senegalese football school Birane Ly, before moving to the academy Darou Salam in 2011. He signed a four-year contract with Reims on 16 January 2019. He made his professional debut with Reims in a 1–1 Ligue 1 tie with Marseille on 22 December 2021. On 27 January 2022, he signed a six-month loan deal with Nîmes in the Ligue 2.

On 1 September 2022, Mbow moved on a new loan to Seraing in the Belgian Pro League.

On 20 July 2023, Mbow signed a three-year contract with Paris FC.

== International career ==
Mbow is a youth international for Senegal, having represented the Senegal U20s at the 2019 U-20 Africa Cup of Nations.

== Personal life ==
His brothers Pape M'Bow and Moussa M'Bow were also professional footballers.

== Career statistics ==
=== Club ===
As of match played 21 May 2024

Appearances and goals by club, season, and competition
Club	Season	League			National cup		Other		Total	
Club	Season	Division	Apps	Goals	Apps	Goals	Apps	Goals	Apps	Goals
Reims B	2019–20	National 2	2	0	—		—		2	0
Reims B	2020–21	National 2	3	0	—		—		3	0
Reims B	2021–22	National 2	7	0	—		—		7	0
Reims B	Total		12	0	—		—		12	0
Reims	2021–22	Ligue 1	1	0	2	0	—		3	0
Nîmes (loan)	2021–22	Ligue 2	12	0	0	0	—		12	0
Nîmes B (loan)	2021–22	National 3	1	0	—		—		1	0
Seraing (loan)	2022–23	Belgian Pro League	25	1	2	0	—		27	1
Paris FC	2023–24	Ligue 2	38	0	3	1	1 (Note: Appearance in the Ligue 2 promotion play-offs)	0	42	1
Career total			89	1	7	1	1	0	97	2

== Honours ==
Senegal U20

- U-20 Africa Cup of Nations runner-up: 2019

Individual

- UNFP Ligue 2 Team of the Year: 2024–25
