= Marvin Tshibuabua =

French association football player (born 2002)

Personal information
- Full name: Marvin Silver Tshibuabua
- Date of birth: 8 January 2002 (age 24)
- Place of birth: Lyon, France
- Height: 1.90 m (6 ft 3 in)
- Position: Defender

Team information
- Current team: Villefranche
- Number: 4

Youth career
- 2008–2011: CASCOL
- 2011–2015: Lyon
- 2015–2016: FC Lyon
- 2016–2020: Saint-Étienne

Senior career*
Years	Team	Apps	(Gls)
2018–2022	Saint-Étienne B	31	(1)
2020	Saint-Étienne	1	(0)
2022–2025	Seraing	68	(5)
2025–2026	Ušće Novi Beograd	2	(0)
2026–	Villefranche	15	(0)

International career^{‡}
2017	France U16	1	(0)
2018–2019	France U17	2	(0)
2019–2020	France U18	6	(0)
- * Club domestic league appearances and goals as of 23 June 2026 ‡ National team caps and goals as of 25 October 2020

Marvin Silver Tshibuabua (born 8 January 2002) is a French professional footballer who plays as a defender for Ligue 3 club Villefranche.

== Club career ==
Tshibuabua made his professional debut for Saint-Étienne on 25 October 2020, in a Ligue 1 game against Metz.

== International career ==
Born in France, Tshibuabua is of Congolese descent. He is a youth international for France.
