= Ejaita Ifoni =

Nigerian footballer

Personal information
- Date of birth: 13 February 2000 (age 26)
- Place of birth: Delta State, Nigeria
- Height: 1.87 m (6 ft 2 in)
- Position: Forward

Team information
- Current team: Seraing

Youth career
- A & B Academy

Senior career*
Years	Team	Apps	(Gls)
2018–2022	Black Bulls	43	(38)
2018	→ Chibuto (loan)	4	(1)
2020	→ Costa do Sol (loan)	0	(0)
2022	→ Porto B (loan)	9	(1)
2022–2024	Seraing	9	(0)
2022–2023	Seraing U23	8	(3)
2024–	Maguary	1	(0)
- * Club domestic league appearances and goals as of 17 January 2024

Ejaita Ifoni (born 13 February 2000) is a Nigerian footballer who plays as a forward for Brazilian club Maguary.

== Club career ==
Born in Delta State, Nigeria, Ifoni moved to Mozambique and played for Costa do Sol, Chibuto and Black Bulls. He became top scorer in the 2020–21 Moçambola, with seventeen goals in fourteen games.

In January 2022, he moved to Portugal to sign for the 'B' team of FC Porto.

On 20 July 2022, Ifoni signed a three-season contract with Seraing in Belgium.

== Career statistics ==
=== Club ===
As of 6 May 2022.

Club	Season	League			Cup		Other		Total	
Club	Season	Division	Apps	Goals	Apps	Goals	Apps	Goals	Apps	Goals
Black Bulls	2018	Moçambola	0	0	–		0	0	0	0
Black Bulls	2019	Moçambola	29	21	–		0	0	29	21
Black Bulls	2020–21	Moçambola	14	17	–		0	0	14	17
Black Bulls	Total		43	38	0	0	0	0	43	38
Chibuto (loan)	2018	Moçambola	4	1	–		0	0	4	1
Costa do Sol (loan)	2020–21	Moçambola	0	0	–		0	0	0	0
Porto B (loan)	2021–22	Liga Portugal 2	9	1	–		0	0	9	1
Seraing	2022–23	Jupiler Pro League	0	0	–		0	0	0	0
Career total			56	40	0	0	0	0	56	40
