= Abdoulaye Sylla (footballer, born 2000) =

Guinean footballer

Personal information
- Date of birth: 10 April 2000 (age 26)
- Place of birth: Conakry, Guinea
- Height: 1.83 m (6 ft 0 in)
- Position: Defender

Team information
- Current team: Sigma Olomouc
- Number: 2

Youth career
- 2011–2020: Nantes

Senior career*
Years	Team	Apps	(Gls)
2018–2022	Nantes II	36	(1)
2021–2022	Nantes	4	(0)
2022–2023	Seraing	22	(0)
2023–2025	Vyškov	30	(5)
2025	→ Sigma Olomouc (loan)	8	(0)
2025	→ Sigma Olomouc B (loan)	3	(0)
2025–	Sigma Olomouc	27	(0)

International career^{‡}
2021–	Guinea	4	(0)
- * Club domestic league appearances and goals as of 26 May 2026 ‡ National team caps and goals as of 10:46, 6 June 2024 (UTC)

Abdoulaye Sylla (born 10 April 2000) is a Guinean professional footballer who plays as a defender for Czech club Sigma Olomouc and the Guinea national team.

== Club career ==
Sylla arrived to France in 2011 from Guinea, and that year joined the youth academy of Nantes. He signed his first professional contract with the club on 28 May 2020. He made his professional debut with Nantes in a 1–1 Ligue 1 tie with Nîmes on 28 February 2021.

On 27 July 2022, Sylla signed a two-year contract with Seraing in Belgium.

On 9 January 2025, Sylla signed a one-year loan deal with Czech club Sigma Olomouc with option to make transfer permanent.

On 11 September 2025, Sylla signed a multi-year contract with Sigma Olomouc.

== International career ==
Sylla debuted for the Guinea national team in a friendly 2–0 loss to Togo on 5 June 2021.
