= Leroy Abanda =

French footballer (born 2000)

Personal information
- Full name: Leroy Abanda Mfomo
- Date of birth: 7 June 2000 (age 26)
- Place of birth: Le Blanc-Mesnil, France
- Height: 1.80 m (5 ft 11 in)
- Position: Left-back

Team information
- Current team: A.E. Kifisia
- Number: 23

Youth career
- 2007–2010: AF Bobigny
- 2010–2015: Paris Université Club
- 2015–2019: Monaco
- 2019: AC Milan

Senior career*
Years	Team	Apps	(Gls)
2018–2019	Monaco B	3	(0)
2019–2022	AC Milan	0	(0)
2019–2020	→ Neuchâtel Xamax (loan)	9	(0)
2021–2022	→ Boulogne (loan)	19	(0)
2021–2022	→ Boulogne B (loan)	19	(0)
2022–2023	Seraing	17	(0)
2023	→ Lamia (loan)	15	(0)
2023–2025	OFI	34	(1)
2025	Suwon FC	5	(0)
2025–2026	Le Mans	6	(0)
2026	Volos	16	(0)
2026–	A.E. Kifisia	5	(0)

International career
2016	France U16	7	(0)
2016–2017	France U17	4	(0)
- * Club domestic league appearances and goals as of 19 September 2026

Leroy Abanda Mfomo (born 7 June 2000) is a French professional footballer who plays as a left-back for Super League Greece club A.E. Kifisia.

== Club career ==
On 28 July 2022, Abanda signed a two-year contract with Seraing in Belgium.

=== OFI ===
On 27 June 2023, he joined OFI on a two-year deal. On 3 September 2023, Abanda scored a late winner against PAOK.

=== Le Mans ===
On 28 July 2025, Abanda signed with Le Mans in Ligue 2.

== International career ==
Abanda was born in France to a Cameroonian father and a Polish mother. He appeared four times for the France U17 national team, including two UEFA Under-17 Championship qualification fixtures.

== Career statistics ==
As of 14 September 2023

Club	Season	League			Cup		Continental		Other		Total	
Club	Season	Division	Apps	Goals	Apps	Goals	Apps	Goals	Apps	Goals	Apps	Goals
Neuchâtel Xamax (loan)	2019–20	Swiss Super League	9	0	0	0	—		—		9	0
Boulogne (loan)	2021–22	Championnat National	19	0	0	0	—		—		19	0
Seraing	2022–23	Belgian Pro League	17	0	3	0	—		—		20	0
Lamia (loan)	2022–23	Superleague Greece	15	0	2	0	—		—		17	0
OFI	2023–24	Superleague Greece	3	1	0	0	—		—		3	1
Career total			63	1	5	0	0	0	0	0	68	1
