= 2018–19 Royal Charleroi SC season =

Charleroi
2018–19 season
- Chairman: Fabien Debecq
- Managing director: Mehdi Bayat
- Head coach: Felice Mazzu
- Stadium: Stade du Pays de Charleroi
- First Division A: 9th
- Belgian Cup: Seventh round
- Top goalscorer: League: Victor Osimhen (12); All: Victor Osimhen (20)
- Biggest win: Charleroi 4–0 Beerschot Wilrijk
- Biggest defeat: Excel Mouscron 3–0 Charleroi
Home colours	Away colours	Third colours

The 2018–19 season was the 115th in the history of Royal Charleroi Sporting Club and the club's seventh consecutive season in the top flight of Belgian football.

== Players ==
=== First-team squad ===
Updated 31 January 2019.

Note: Flags indicate national team as defined under FIFA eligibility rules; some limited exceptions apply. Players may hold more than one non-FIFA nationality.

No.	Pos.	Nation	Player
1	GK	FRA	Nicolas Penneteau
4	DF	BEL	Maxime Busi
6	DF	MKD	Gjoko Zajkov
7	MF	BEL	David Henen
8	DF	ESP	Francisco Martos
9	FW	MLI	Adama Niane
10	FW	FRA	Jérémy Perbet
12	GK	SWE	Joachim Imbrechts
13	MF	SEN	Christophe Diandy
15	GK	BEL	Valentin Baume
17	DF	GRE	Stergos Marinos
20	MF	BEL	Nathan Rodes
22	MF	BEL	Gaëtan Hendrickx

No.	Pos.	Nation	Player
23	DF	FRA	Steeven Willems
24	DF	BEL	Dorian Dessoleil
25	DF	ANG	Núrio Fortuna
26	MF	MAD	Marco Ilaimaharitra
33	DF	ITA	Gabriele Angella (on loan from Udinese)
35	GK	COD	Parfait Mandanda
44	MF	JPN	Ryota Morioka (on loan from Anderlecht)
45	FW	NGR	Victor Osimhen (on loan from Wolfsburg)
69	GK	FRA	Rémy Riou
70	MF	IRI	Younes Delfi
77	MF	BEL	Massimo Bruno
88	MF	IRI	Ali Gholizadeh

=== On loan ===
Note: Flags indicate national team as defined under FIFA eligibility rules; some limited exceptions apply. Players may hold more than one non-FIFA nationality.

No.	Pos.	Nation	Player
5	DF	FRA	Dorian Dervite (at NAC Breda until 30 June 2019)
28	MF	BEL	Enes Sağlık (at AFC Tubize until 30 June 2019)
29	MF	FRA	Romain Grange (at Grenoble Foot 38 until 30 June 2019)
—	FW	CIV	Chris Bedia (at S.V. Zulte Waregem until 30 June 2019)
—	FW	BEL	David Pollet (at KAS Eupen until 30 June 2019)
—	MF	IRI	Omid Noorafkan (at Esteghlal until 30 June 2019)

== Pre-season and friendlies ==
Win Draw Loss

30 June 2018 Friendly	Cercle Brugge (Belgium)	0–2	(Belgium) Charleroi	Kortemark, Belgium
18:00 CEST (UTC+2)		Report		Stadium: Sportcomplex Kortemark

6 July 2018 Friendly	Charleroi (Belgium)	1–1	(Belgium) Tubize-Braine	Mariembourg, Belgium
16:30 CEST (UTC+2)		Report		Stadium: Stade du Roi Soleil

11 July 2018 Friendly	Valenciennes (France)	0–1	(Belgium) Charleroi	Swolgen, Netherlands
18:00 CEST (UTC+2)		Report		Stadium: Sportpark Sporting Swolgen Tienray

13 July 2018 Friendly	Mainz 05 (Germany)	2–0	(Belgium) Charleroi	Tegelen, Netherlands
18:30 CEST (UTC+2)		Report		Stadium: Sportpark de Bakenbos

18 July 2018 Friendly	Dijon (France)	2–2	(Belgium) Charleroi	Dijon, France
16:30 CEST (UTC+2)		Report		Stadium: Stade Gaston-Gérard

21 July 2018 Friendly	Charleroi (Belgium)	2–2	(France) Nice	Charleroi, Belgium
18:00 CEST (UTC+2)		Report		Stadium: Stade du Pays de Charleroi

11 January 2019 Friendly	FC St. Pauli (Germany)	2–3	(Belgium) Charleroi	Spain
15:00 CET (UTC+1)		Report

== Competitions ==
=== Overall record ===
Competition	First match	Last match	Starting round	Final position	Record							
Competition	First match	Last match	Starting round	Final position	Pld	W	D	L	GF	GA	GD	Win %
First Division A	29 July 2018	17 March 2019	Matchday 1	9th	30	12	6	12	43	43	+0	40.00
Europa League play-offs	31 March 2019	26 May 2019	Matchday 1	Runners-up	12	8	1	3	24	11	+13	66.67
Belgian Cup	26 September 2018	5 December 2018	Sixth round	Seventh round	2	1	0	1	3	3	+0	50.00
Total					44	21	7	16	70	57	+13	47.73

Source: Soccerway

=== First Division A ===
==== League table ====
Pos	Team	Pld	W	D	L	GF	GA	GD	Pts	Qualification or relegation
7	Sint-Truiden	30	12	11	7	47	36	+11	47	Qualification for the Europa League play-offs
8	Kortrijk	30	12	7	11	44	42	+2	43	Qualification for the Europa League play-offs
9	Charleroi	30	12	6	12	43	43	0	42	Qualification for the Europa League play-offs
10	Excel Mouscron	30	11	7	12	33	33	0	40	Qualification for the Europa League play-offs
11	Zulte Waregem	30	8	9	13	49	60	−11	33	Qualification for the Europa League play-offs

Source: Belgian First Division A (in Dutch), Soccerway
Rules for classification: 1) Points; 2) Matches won; 3) Goal difference; 4) Goals scored; 5) Away goals scored; 6) Away matches won; 7) Play-off.

==== Results summary ====
Overall								Home						Away					
Pld	W	D	L	GF	GA	GD	Pts	W	D	L	GF	GA	GD	W	D	L	GF	GA	GD
30	12	6	12	43	43	0	42	7	3	5	22	18	+4	5	3	7	21	25	−4

==== Matches ====
29 July 2018 1	Charleroi	0–1	Antwerp	Charleroi
--:-- CEST (UTC+2)				Stadium: Stade du Pays de Charleroi

4 August 2018 2	Eupen	1–4	Charleroi	Eupen
--:-- CEST (UTC+2)				Stadium: [[]]

12 August 2018 3	Charleroi	1–2	Anderlecht	Charleroi
--:-- CEST (UTC+2)				Stadium: Stade du Pays de Charleroi

19 August 2018 4	Genk	3–1	Charleroi	Genk
--:-- CEST (UTC+2)				Stadium: [[]]

25 August 2018 5	Charleroi	0–2	Kortrijk	Charleroi
--:-- CEST (UTC+2)				Stadium: Stade du Pays de Charleroi

1 September 2018 6	Charleroi	3–1	Excel Mouscron	Charleroi
--:-- CEST (UTC+2)				Stadium: Stade du Pays de Charleroi

15 September 2018 7	Standard Liège	0–0	Charleroi	Liège
--:-- CEST (UTC+2)				Stadium: [[]]

22 September 2018 8	Waasland-Beveren	1–1	Charleroi	Beveren
--:-- CEST (UTC+2)				Stadium: [[]]

29 September 2018 9	Charleroi	2–1	Lokeren	Charleroi
--:-- CEST (UTC+2)				Stadium: Stade du Pays de Charleroi

5 October 2018 10	Cercle Brugge	2–1	Charleroi	Bruges
--:-- CEST (UTC+2)				Stadium: [[]]

21 October 2018 11	Charleroi	3–2	Zulte Waregem	Charleroi
--:-- CEST (UTC+2)				Stadium: Stade du Pays de Charleroi

26 October 2018 12	Gent	2–1	Charleroi	Charleroi
--:-- CEST (UTC+2)				Stadium: Stade du Pays de Charleroi

30 October 2018 13	Charleroi	1–0	Sint-Truiden	Charleroi
--:-- CEST (UTC+2)				Stadium: Stade du Pays de Charleroi

2 November 2018 14	Oostende	2–1	Charleroi	Ostend
--:-- CET (UTC+1)				Stadium: [[]]

10 November 2018 15	Charleroi	2–1	Club Brugge	Charleroi
--:-- CET (UTC+1)				Stadium: Stade du Pays de Charleroi

25 November 2018 16	Lokeren	2–4	Charleroi	Lokeren
--:-- CET (UTC+1)				Stadium: [[]]

1 December 2018 17	Charleroi	3–1	Cercle Brugge	Charleroi
--:-- CET (UTC+1)				Stadium: Stade du Pays de Charleroi

9 December 2018 18	Anderlecht	1–1	Charleroi	Anderlecht
--:-- CET (UTC+1)				Stadium: [[]]

14 December 2018 19	Charleroi	2–0	Gent	Charleroi
--:-- CET (UTC+1)				Stadium: Stade du Pays de Charleroi

23 December 2018 20	Zulte Waregem	3–1	Charleroi	Waregem
--:-- CET (UTC+1)				Stadium: [[]]

26 December 2018 21	Charleroi	0–1	Standard Liège	Charleroi
--:-- CET (UTC+1)				Stadium: Stade du Pays de Charleroi

20 January 2019 22	Club Brugge	0–1	Charleroi	Bruges
--:-- CET (UTC+1)				Stadium: [[]]

26 January 2019 23	Charleroi	2–2	Waasland-Beveren	Charleroi
--:-- CET (UTC+1)				Stadium: Stade du Pays de Charleroi

1 February 2019 24	Excel Mouscron	3–0	Charleroi	Mouscron
--:-- CET (UTC+1)				Stadium: [[]]

9 February 2019 25	Charleroi	1–1	Oostende	Charleroi
--:-- CET (UTC+1)				Stadium: Stade du Pays de Charleroi

16 February 2019 26	Kortrijk	1–2	Charleroi	Kortrijk
--:-- CET (UTC+1)				Stadium: Guldensporen Stadion

24 February 2019 27	Sint-Truiden	3–1	Charleroi	Sint-Truiden
--:-- CET (UTC+1)				Stadium: [[]]

2 March 2019 28	Charleroi	1–1	Genk	Charleroi
--:-- CET (UTC+1)				Stadium: Stade du Pays de Charleroi

10 March 2019 29	Antwerp	1–2	Charleroi	Antwerp
--:-- CET (UTC+1)				Stadium: [[]]

17 March 2019 30	Charleroi	1–2	Eupen	Charleroi
--:-- CET (UTC+1)				Stadium: Stade du Pays de Charleroi

==== Europa League play-offs ====
Pos	Team	Pld	W	D	L	GF	GA	GD	Pts	Qualification
1	Charleroi	10	7	1	2	20	7	+13	22	Qualification for the Europa League play-off semi-final
2	Sint-Truiden	10	4	5	1	16	13	+3	17	
3	Westerlo	10	3	3	4	13	12	+1	12	
4	Oostende	10	3	3	4	12	15	−3	12	
5	Eupen	10	3	2	5	9	15	−6	11	
6	Beerschot Wilrijk	10	2	2	6	11	19	−8	8	

Updated to match(es) played on completed. Source:
Rules for classification: 1) Points; 2) Matches won; 3) Goal difference; 4) Goals scored; 5) Away goals scored; 6) Away matches won; 7) Play-off.

===== Matches =====
31 March 2019 1	Sint-Truiden	3–1	Charleroi	Sint-Truiden
--:-- CEST (UTC+2)				Stadium: [[]]

3 April 2019 2	Charleroi	1–2	Oostende	Charleroi
--:-- CEST (UTC+2)				Stadium: Stade du Pays de Charleroi

7 April 2019 3	Eupen	0–1	Charleroi	Eupen
--:-- CEST (UTC+2)				Stadium: [[]]

14 April 2019 4	Charleroi	2–0	Westerlo	Charleroi
--:-- CEST (UTC+2)				Stadium: Stade du Pays de Charleroi

22 April 2019 5	Charleroi	4–0	Beerschot Wilrijk	Charleroi
--:-- CEST (UTC+2)				Stadium: Stade du Pays de Charleroi

27 April 2019 6	Oostende	2–2	Charleroi	Ostend
--:-- CEST (UTC+2)				Stadium: [[]]

4 May 2019 7	Charleroi	2–0	Sint-Truiden	Charleroi
--:-- CEST (UTC+2)				Stadium: Stade du Pays de Charleroi

11 May 2019 8	Beerschot Wilrijk	0–3	Charleroi	Antwerp
--:-- CEST (UTC+2)				Stadium: Olympisch Stadion

15 May 2019 9	Westerlo	0–2	Charleroi	Westerlo
--:-- CEST (UTC+2)				Stadium: Het Kuipje

18 May 2019 10	Charleroi	2–0	Eupen	Charleroi
--:-- CEST (UTC+2)				Stadium: Stade du Pays de Charleroi

===== Semi-final =====
22 May 2019 Semi-final	Kortrijk	1–2	Charleroi	Kortrijk
20:30 CEST (UTC+2)				Stadium: Guldensporen Stadion

===== Final =====
26 May 2019 Final	Antwerp	3–2	Charleroi	Antwerp
18:00 CEST (UTC+2)				Stadium: Bosuilstadion

=== Belgian Cup ===
26 September 2018 Sixth round	Eendracht Aalst	0–2	Charleroi	Aalst
20:30 CEST (UTC+2)			Osimhen 90+2'; Benavente 90+5'	Stadium: Pierre Cornelisstadion

5 December 2018 Seventh round	Charleroi	1–3	Genk	Charleroi
20:45 CET (UTC+1)	Gholizadeh 35'		Dewaest 54'; Mæhle 76'; Gano 90+3'	Stadium: Stade du Pays de Charleroi
