= 2020–21 Royal Charleroi SC season =

Charleroi
2020–21 season
- Chairman: Fabien Debecq
- Managing director: Mehdi Bayat
- Head coach: Karim Belhocine
- Stadium: Stade du Pays de Charleroi
- Belgian First Division A: 13th
- Belgian Cup: Seventh round
- UEFA Europa League: Play-off round
- Top goalscorer: League: Mamadou Fall; Shamar Nicholson (9 each); All: Mamadou Fall; Shamar Nicholson (10 each)
Home colours	Away colours	Third colours

The 2020–21 Royal Charleroi Sporting Club season was the club's 117th season in existence and the 9th consecutive season in the top flight of Belgian football. In addition to the domestic league, Charleroi participated in this season's editions of the Belgian Cup and the UEFA Europa League. The season covered the period from 1 July 2020 to 30 June 2021.

== Players ==
=== First-team squad ===
Note: Flags indicate national team as defined under FIFA eligibility rules; some limited exceptions apply. Players may hold more than one non-FIFA nationality.

No.	Pos.	Nation	Player
1	GK	FRA	Nicolas Penneteau
2	DF	BUL	Ivan Goranov
3	DF	BIH	Ognjen Vranješ (on loan from Anderlecht)
4	DF	BEL	Jules Van Cleemput
5	DF	SEN	Modou Diagne
6	DF	MKD	Gjoko Zajkov
7	FW	COD	Jordan Botaka (on loan from Gent)
8	MF	IRI	Ali Gholizadeh
10	FW	IRI	Kaveh Rezaei (on loan from Brugge)
12	MF	BEL	Joris Kayembe
13	MF	SEN	Christophe Diandy
14	GK	SWE	Joachim Imbrechts
15	FW	BEL	Anthony Descotte
16	FW	JAM	Shamar Nicholson
18	DF	BEL	Levi Malungu
19	MF	BRA	Lucas Ribeiro Costa
20	DF	ENG	Jon Flanagan

No.	Pos.	Nation	Player
22	MF	BEL	Gaëtan Hendrickx
23	DF	FRA	Steeven Willems
24	DF	BEL	Dorian Dessoleil
26	MF	MAD	Marco Ilaimaharitra
27	MF	SEN	Mamadou Fall
28	MF	BEL	Ken Nkuba
29	MF	PER	Cristian Benavente (on loan from Pyramids)
30	DF	BEL	Guillaume Gillet
33	DF	CIV	Cédric Kipré (on loan from West Bromwich Albion)
34	MF	MAR	Amine Benchaib
38	FW	BDI	Saido Berahino (on loan from Zulte Waregem)
40	GK	FRA	Rémy Descamps
42	DF	BEL	Yunus Bahadir
44	MF	JPN	Ryota Morioka
77	MF	BEL	Massimo Bruno
91	FW	POL	Łukasz Teodorczyk (on loan from Udinese)

=== On loan ===
Note: Flags indicate national team as defined under FIFA eligibility rules; some limited exceptions apply. Players may hold more than one non-FIFA nationality.

No.	Pos.	Nation	Player
20	MF	CIV	Jean Thierry Lazare (at Estoril Praia until 30 June 2021)
35	GK	COD	Parfait Mandanda (at Hartford Athletic until 31 December 2020)
70	MF	IRI	Younes Delfi (at HNK Gorica until 30 June 2021)
—	FW	CMR	Arnold Garita (at FC Villefranche until 30 June 2021)

== Pre-season and friendlies ==
Win Draw Loss

4 July 2020 Friendly	Anderlecht (Belgium)	0–1	(Belgium) Charleroi	Brussels, Belgium
12:00 CEST (UTC+2)				Stadium: Complexe Sportif Neerpede - Terrein 6

7 July 2020 Friendly	Zulte Waregem (Belgium)	1–2	(Belgium) Charleroi	Waregem, Belgium
16:00 CEST (UTC+2)				Stadium: Regenboogstadion

10 July 2020 Friendly	Kortrijk (Belgium)	1–1	(Belgium) Charleroi	Kortrijk, Belgium
15:00 CEST (UTC+2)				Stadium: Guldensporen Stadion

15 July 2020 Friendly	Saint-Étienne (France)	4–0	(Belgium) Charleroi	L'Étrat, France
17:30 CEST (UTC+2)	Fofana 44'; Krasso 78'; Boudebouz 82', 84' (pen.)			Stadium: Centre sportif Robert-Herbin

21 July 2020 Friendly	URSL Visé (Belgium)	1–1	(Belgium) Charleroi	Liège, Belgium
16:00 CEST (UTC+2)				Stadium: Terrain Rue de Liège

24 July 2020 Friendly	Metz (France)	3–0	(Belgium) Charleroi	Metz, France
16:00 CEST (UTC+2)	Ambrose 53'; Boulaya 87'; Gueye 113'			Stadium: Stade Saint-Symphorien

31 July 2020 Friendly	R.O.C. Charleroi (Belgium)	0–4	(Belgium) Charleroi	Charleroi, Belgium
17:00 CEST (UTC+2)				Stadium: Stade de la Neuville

1 August 2020 Friendly	Charleroi (Belgium)	2–2	(France) Ajaccio	Charleroi, Belgium
19:00 CEST (UTC+2)				Stadium: Stade du Pays de Charleroi

3 September 2020 Friendly	Lens (France)	5–2	(Belgium) Charleroi	Lens, France
12:00 CEST (UTC+2)	Banza 4'; Kakuta 31' (pen.); Robail 63'; Sotoca 88'; Clauss 90+5'		Nicholson 54'; Costa 61'	Stadium: La Gaillette; Attendance: 0

3 September 2020 Friendly	Lens (France)	Cancelled	(Belgium) Charleroi	Lens, France
13:15 CEST (UTC+2)				Stadium: La Gaillette

== Competitions ==
=== Overview ===
Competition	First match	Last match	Starting round	Final position	Record							
Competition	First match	Last match	Starting round	Final position	Pld	W	D	L	GF	GA	GD	Win %
Belgian First Division A	8 August 2020	17 April 2021	Matchday 1	13th	34	11	9	14	46	49	−3	32.35
Belgian Cup	3 February 2021	11 February 2021	Sixth round	Seventh round	2	1	0	1	2	3	−1	50.00
UEFA Europa League	24 September 2020	1 October 2020	Third qualifying round	Play-off round	2	1	0	1	3	3	+0	50.00
Total					38	13	9	16	51	55	−4	34.21

Source: Soccerway

=== Belgian First Division A ===
==== League table ====
Pos	Team	Pld	W	D	L	GF	GA	GD	Pts
11	OH Leuven	34	12	9	13	54	59	−5	45
12	Eupen	34	10	13	11	44	55	−11	43
13	Charleroi	34	11	9	14	46	49	−3	42
14	Kortrijk	34	11	6	17	44	57	−13	39
15	Sint-Truiden	34	10	8	16	41	52	−11	38

Source: Jupiler Pro League (in Dutch), Soccerway
Rules for classification: 1) Points; 2) Matches won; 3) Goal difference; 4) Goals scored; 5) Away matches won; 6) Away goal difference; 7) Away goals scored; 8) Play-off.

==== Results summary ====
Overall								Home						Away					
Pld	W	D	L	GF	GA	GD	Pts	W	D	L	GF	GA	GD	W	D	L	GF	GA	GD
34	11	9	14	46	49	−3	42	5	6	6	18	16	+2	6	3	8	28	33	−5

Source: Jupiler Pro League

==== Results by round ====
Round	1	2	3	4	5	6	7	8	9	10	11	12	13	14	15	16	17	18	19	20	21	22	23	24	25	26	27	28	29	30	31	32	33	34
Ground	A	H	A	H	A	H	A	H	A	H	H	A	H	A	H	A	A	H	A	A	H	A	A	H	A	H	H	A	H	H	A	H	A	H
Result	W	W	W	W	W	W	D	L	L	L	W	D	L	L	D	W	W	W	L	L	L	L	L	D	W	D	D	D	L	D	L	D	L	L
Position	5	3	2	1	1	1	1	1	2	3	2	2	4	6	6	5	3	3	3	3	4	4	4	4	5	6	7	9	9	9	10	11	12	13

Source: Jupiler Pro League
A = Away; H = Home; W = Win; D = Draw; L = Loss

==== Matches ====
The league fixtures were announced on 8 July 2020.

8 August 2020 1	Club Brugge	0–1	Charleroi	Bruges
16:30 CEST (UTC+2)	Sobol (yellow card) 42'; Dennis (yellow card) 54'	Report	Ilaimaharitra (yellow card) 17'; Busi (yellow card) 35'; Willems (yellow card) 64'; Morioka 78'	Stadium: Jan Breydel Stadium; Attendance: 0 Referee: Lawrence Visser

15 August 2020 2	Charleroi	1–0	KV Oostende	Charleroi
19:00 CEST (UTC+2)	Rezaei 76'; Morioka (yellow card) 80'	Report	Bataille (yellow card) 50'; Gueye (yellow card) 57'	Stadium: Stade du Pays de Charleroi; Attendance: 0 Referee: Wesli De Cremer

22 August 2020 3	OH Leuven	1–3	Charleroi	Leuven
18:30 CEST (UTC+2)	Mercier 34'; Sowah (yellow card) 59'	Report	Dessoleil 6'; Fall 49', (red card) 64'; Gholizadeh (yellow card) 59'; Ilaimaharitra (yellow card) 69'; Rezaei 80'; Busi (yellow card) 82'; Hendrickx (yellow card) 90+2'	Stadium: Den Dreef; Attendance: 0 Referee: Erik Lambrechts

30 August 2020 4	Charleroi	2–0	Antwerp	Charleroi
18:15 CEST (UTC+2)	Dessoleil (yellow card) 13'; Nicholson 17', 90+1'; Busi (yellow card) 30'; Morioka (yellow card) 39'; Penneteau (yellow card) 83'	Report	Batubinsika (yellow card) 12'; Verstraete (red card) 22'; Gerkens (yellow card) 40'; Haroun (yellow card) 44'	Stadium: Stade du Pays de Charleroi; Attendance: 0 Referee: Alexandre Boucaut

13 September 2020 5	Zulte Waregem	0–2	Charleroi	Waregem
18:15 CEST (UTC+2)		Report	Rezaei 71'; Willems (yellow card) 84'; Nicholson 88'	Stadium: Regenboogstadion; Attendance: 3,498; Referee: Jan Boterberg

18 September 2020 6	Charleroi	3–1	Beerschot	Charleroi
20:45 CEST (UTC+2)	Rezaei 29', 87' (pen.); Gholizadeh 55'	Report	Sanusi (yellow card) 54'; Suzuki 90+1'	Stadium: Stade du Pays de Charleroi; Attendance: 4,706; Referee: Kevin van Damme

27 September 2020 7	Excel Mouscron	1–1	Charleroi	Mouscron
19:45 CEST (UTC+2)	Tabekou 45+2'; Ciranni (yellow card) 78'; Hočko (yellow card) 89'	Report	Fall 30'; Kayembe (yellow card) 68'	Stadium: Stade Le Canonnier; Attendance: 1,000; Referee: Bram Van Driessche

4 October 2020 8	Charleroi	1–2	Standard Liège	Charleroi
18:15 CEST (UTC+2)	Nicholson (yellow card) 46'; Fall 87'; Ilaimaharitra (yellow card) 89'	Report	Tapsoba (yellow card) 32'; Amallah (yellow card) 44'; Vanheusden (yellow card) 72'; Balikwisha 79'; Raskin 84'	Stadium: Stade du Pays de Charleroi; Attendance: 5,261; Referee: Lawrence Visser

18 October 2020 9	Genk	2–1	Charleroi	Genk
18:15 CEST (UTC+2)	Onuachu 25', (yellow card) 82'; Ito (yellow card) 28' (yellow-red card) 82'; Mæhle 63'; Hrošovský (yellow card) 89'	Report	Willems (yellow card) 34'; Berahino 48'; Van Cleemput (yellow card) 60'	Stadium: Luminus Arena; Attendance: 2,743; Referee: Jonathan Lardot

31 October 2020 11	Charleroi	3–0	Cercle Brugge	Charleroi
18:30 CET (UTC+1)	Gholizadeh 53'; Berahino 58'; Morioka (yellow card) 68'; Nicholson 82'; Kayembe (yellow card) 90+2'	Report	Bates (yellow card) 48'	Stadium: Stade du Pays de Charleroi; Attendance: 0 Referee: Christof Dierick

6 November 2020 12	KV Mechelen	3–3	Charleroi	Mechelen
20:45 CET (UTC+1)	Hairemans 9'; De Camargo 32'; Voet (yellow card) 58'; Defour (yellow card) 61'; Van Damme 83'	Report	Fall (yellow card) 8'; Rezaei 20'; Vanlerberghe 57' (o.g.); Ilaimaharitra (yellow card) 68'; Gholizadeh 72'; Willems (yellow card) 82'	Stadium: Achter de Kazerne; Attendance: 0 Referee: Bert Put

22 November 2020 13	Charleroi	0–1	Gent	Charleroi
18:15 CET (UTC+1)	Rezaei (yellow card) 37'	Report	Ngadeu-Ngadjui (yellow card) 34'; Bukari 45'; Fortuna (yellow card) 61'	Stadium: Stade du Pays de Charleroi; Attendance: 0 Referee: Nathan Verboomen

27 November 2020 14	Eupen	3–1	Charleroi	Eupen
20:45 CET (UTC+1)	Prevljak 18'; Penneteau 48' (o.g.); Ngoy 75'; Heris (yellow card) 90+2'	Report	Willems (yellow card) 45+1'; Gillet (yellow card) 52'; Morioka (yellow card) 70'; Kayembe 85'; Gholizadeh (yellow card) 87'; Nkuba (yellow card) 90'	Stadium: Kehrwegstadion; Attendance: 0 Referee: Nicolas Laforge

2 December 2020 10	Charleroi	0–2	Waasland-Beveren	Charleroi
17:00 CET (UTC+1)	Ilaimaharitra (red card) 45+1'; Nkuba (yellow card) 87'	Report	Heymans (yellow card) 14'; Wiegel (yellow card) 30'; Koita 35', 90+1'; Bertone (yellow card) 84'	Stadium: Stade du Pays de Charleroi; Attendance: 0 Referee: Lothar D'hondt

7 December 2020 15	Charleroi	0–0	Kortrijk	Charleroi
20:45 CET (UTC+1)	Ilaimaharitra (yellow card) 47'; Nicholson (yellow card) 52'; Willems (yellow card) 75'; Gillet (yellow card) 84'	Report	Mboyo (penalty missed) 33', (yellow card) 70'; Sainsbury (yellow card) 34'	Stadium: Stade du Pays de Charleroi; Attendance: 0 Referee: Kevin Van Damme

12 December 2020 16	Sint-Truiden	1–2	Charleroi	Sint-Truiden
20:45 CET (UTC+1)	Nazon 43'	Report	Fall 25'; Nicholson 51'	Stadium: Stayen; Attendance: 0 Referee: Bram Van Driessche

15 December 2020 17	Cercle Brugge	3–4	Charleroi	Bruges
18:45 CET (UTC+1)	Ugbo 17', 25'; Musaba 85'	Report	Gholizadeh 63'; Nicholson 64'; Morioka 70'; Bruno 87'	Stadium: Jan Breydel Stadium; Attendance: 0 Referee: Wesley Alen

18 December 2020 18	Charleroi	1–0	Anderlecht	Charleroi
20:45 CET (UTC+1)	Gholizadeh 90+3'	Report		Stadium: Stade du Pays de Charleroi; Attendance: 0 Referee: Lawrence Visser

27 December 2020 19	Antwerp	2–1	Charleroi	Antwerp
13:30 CET (UTC+1)	Benavente 73'; Mbokani 78', (yellow card) 87'	Report	Seck 51' (o.g.); Diagne (yellow card) 90+1'	Stadium: Bosuilstadion; Attendance: 0 Referee: Alexandre Boucaut

9 January 2021 30	Oostende	3–2	Charleroi	Ostend
20:45 CET (UTC+1)				Stadium: Diaz Arena; Attendance: 0

16 January 2021 20	Charleroi	0–1	KV Mechelen	Charleroi
20:45 CET (UTC+1)	Nicholson (yellow card) 46'	Report	Schoofs (yellow card) 30'; Hairemans 59'	Stadium: Stade du Pays de Charleroi; Attendance: 0 Referee: Nicolas Laforge

19 January 2021 21	Anderlecht	3–0	Charleroi	Anderlecht
21:00 CET (UTC+1)	Nmecha 23' (pen.); Vlap 45+1' (pen.); Amuzu 81'	Report	Dessoleil (yellow card) 45'; Ilaimaharitra (yellow card) 45+2'; Kayembe (yellow card) 50'	Stadium: Constant Vanden Stock Stadium; Attendance: 0 Referee: Bram van Driessche

24 January 2021 22	Standard Liège	3–2	Charleroi	Liège
18:15 CET (UTC+1)	Klauss 13'; Balikwisha 38'; Carcela (yellow card) 73'; Muleka 80'	Report	Fall 30', 65'; Benchaib (yellow card) 50'; Penneteau (yellow card) 90+2', (red card) 90+5'	Stadium: Stade Maurice Dufrasne; Attendance: 0 Referee: Jonathan Lardot

27 January 2021 23	Charleroi	1–1	OH Leuven	Charleroi
21:00 CET (UTC+1)	Gillet (yellow card) 46'; Fall (yellow card) 49'; Dessoleil 61'	Report	Sowah 12'; Tshimanga (yellow card) 60'; Malinov (yellow card) 64'; Al-Taamari (yellow card) 90'	Stadium: Stade du Pays de Charleroi; Attendance: 0 Referee: Kevin Van Damme

30 January 2021 24	Kortrijk	1–3	Charleroi	Kortrijk
20:45 CET (UTC+1)	Derijck (red card) 60'; Jonckheere (yellow card) 76'; Guèye 81'	Report	Gholizadeh 22'; Fall 55', 62'; Benchaib (yellow card) 58'	Stadium: Guldensporen Stadion; Attendance: 0 Referee: Wim Smet

7 February 2021 25	Charleroi	1–1	Zulte Waregem	Charleroi
16:00 CET (UTC+1)	Benchaib 1'; Descamps (yellow card) 89'	Report	Dompé (yellow card) 82'; Bruno 90+2'	Stadium: Stade du Pays de Charleroi; Attendance: 0 Referee: Wesli De Cremer

20 February 2021 27	Waasland-Beveren	1–1	Charleroi	Beveren
20:45 CET (UTC+1)	Koita (yellow card) 48'; Bertone (yellow card) 78'; Vukotić 87'	Report	Bruno 90+1'	Stadium: Freethiel Stadion; Attendance: 0 Referee: Kevin Van Damme

26 February 2021 28	Charleroi	1–2	Genk	Charleroi
20:45 CET (UTC+1)	Gholizadeh 52'; Ilaimaharitra (yellow card) 77'; Van Cleemput (yellow card) 86'	Report	Onuachu 17' (pen.); Heynen (yellow card) 59'; Thorstvedt (yellow card) 77', (goal) 83'	Stadium: Stade du Pays de Charleroi; Attendance: 0 Referee: Jan Boterberg

5 March 2021 29	Charleroi	0–0	Sint-Truiden	Charleroi
20:45 CET (UTC+1)	Rezaei (yellow card) 40'	Report	Hashioka (yellow card) 20'; Durkin (yellow card) 41'	Stadium: Stade du Pays de Charleroi; Attendance: 0 Referee: Lawrence Visser

12 March 2021 26	Charleroi	1–1	Club Brugge	Charleroi
20:45 CET (UTC+1)	Dessoleil (yellow card) 57'; Kipré (yellow card) 64'; Nicholson 90'; Vranješ (yellow card) 90+2'	Report	Dessoleil 7' (o.g.)	Stadium: Stade du Pays de Charleroi; Attendance: 0 Referee: Lothar D'hondt
Note: The match was originally scheduled for 14 February 2021, but was postponed due to unsuitable ground.

4 April 2021 32	Charleroi	1–1	Excel Mouscron	Charleroi
20:45 CEST (UTC+2)	Botaka (yellow card) 9'; Fall 88'	Report	Quirynen (yellow card) 21'; Lepoint (yellow card) 58'; Hočko (yellow card) 76'; Da Costa 85'	Stadium: Stade du Pays de Charleroi; Attendance: 0 Referee: Christof Dierick

7 April 2021 31	Beerschot	2–1	Charleroi	Antwerp
19:00 CEST (UTC+2)	Holzhauser 34' (pen.), 90+4' (pen.), (yellow card) 90+4'; Van den Bergh (yellow card) 90+7'	Report	Fall (yellow card) 26'; Van Cleemput (yellow card) 33'; Nicholson 70'	Stadium: Olympisch Stadion; Attendance: 0 Referee: Jonathan Lardot

10 April 2021 33	Gent	4–0	Charleroi	Ghent
20:45 CEST (UTC+2)	Bezus 4', 8' (pen.); Godeau (yellow card) 61'; Tissoudali 64'; Yaremchuk (yellow card) 79'; De Bruyn 86'; Dorsch (yellow card) 88'	Report	Kipré (yellow card) 37'; Van Cleemput (yellow card) 45+2'	Stadium: Ghelamco Arena; Attendance: 0 Referee: Nathan Verboomen

17 April 2021 34	Charleroi	2–3	Eupen	Charleroi
18:30 CEST (UTC+2)	Kipré (yellow card) 19'; Gholizadeh 32'; Ilaimaharitra (yellow card) 33', (goal) 81' (pen.); Teodorczyk (yellow card) 46'	Report	Prevljak (penalty missed) 19', 20', 28', 45+1'	Stadium: Stade du Pays de Charleroi; Attendance: 0 Referee: Bram Van Driessche

=== Belgian Cup ===
3 February 2021 Sixth round	Charleroi	1–0	Westerlo	Charleroi
18:00 CET (UTC+1)	Teodorczyk 87'	Report		Stadium: Stade du Pays de Charleroi; Attendance: 0

11 February 2021 Seventh round	Gent	3–1	Charleroi	Ghent
20:45 CET (UTC+1)	Yaremchuk 74'; Odjidja-Ofoe 81'; Tissoudali (yellow card) 83'; Berahino 83' (o.g.)	Report	Nicholson 1'; Fall (yellow card) 72'	Stadium: Ghelamco Arena; Attendance: 0 Referee: Lawrence Visser

=== UEFA Europa League ===
24 September 2020 Third qualifying round	Charleroi (Belgium)	2–1 (a.e.t.)	(Serbia) Partizan	Charleroi, Belgium
19:00 CEST (UTC+2)	Dessoleil 10'; Gholizadeh (yellow card) 93'; Rezaei 108'	Report	Soumah 53'; Marković (yellow card) 54'; Ostojić (yellow card) 106'	Stadium: Stade du Pays de Charleroi; Attendance: 0 Referee: Bobby Madden (Scotland)

1 October 2020 Play-off round	Charleroi (Belgium)	1–2	(Poland) Lech Poznań	Charleroi, Belgium
19:00 CEST (UTC+2)	Rezaei (yellow card) 20'; Fall 56'; Nicholson (yellow card) 90'; Belhocine (yellow card) 90+1'	Report	Ramírez (yellow card) 32', (goal) 34'; Puchacz 41'; Šatka (yellow card) 50' (yellow-red card) 77'	Stadium: Stade du Pays de Charleroi; Attendance: 0 Referee: Felix Zwayer (Germany)

== Statistics ==
=== Goalscorers ===
As of 17 September 2020

Rank	No.	Pos	Nat	Name	Pro League	Belgian Cup	Europa League	Total
1	10	FW	(Iran)	Kaveh Rezaei	5	0	0	5
1	16	FW	(Jamaica)	Shamar Nicholson	3	0	0	3
2	24	DF	(Belgium)	Dorian Dessoleil	1	0	0	1
2	27	MF	(Senegal)	Mamadou Fall	1	0	0	1
2	44	MF	(Japan)	Ryota Morioka	1	0	0	1
Totals					9	0	0	9
