= 2019–20 Royal Charleroi SC season =

R. Charleroi S.C.
2019–20 season
- Owner: Fabien Debecq
- Managing director: Mehdi Bayat
- Head coach: Karim Belhocine
- Stadium: Stade du Pays de Charleroi
- First Division A: 3rd
- Belgian Cup: Quarter-finals
| Home colours | Away colours | Third colours |

The 2019–20 season was the 116th season in the existence of R. Charleroi S.C. and the club's 8th consecutive season in the top flight of Belgian football. In addition to the domestic league, R. Charleroi S.C. participated in this season's edition of the Belgian Cup.

== Players ==
=== First-team squad ===
Note: Flags indicate national team as defined under FIFA eligibility rules; some limited exceptions apply. Players may hold more than one non-FIFA nationality.

| No. | Pos. | Nation | Player |
|---|---|---|---|
| 1 | GK | FRA | Nicolas Penneteau |
| 4 | DF | BEL | Maxime Busi |
| 5 | DF | SEN | Modou Diagne |
| 6 | DF | MKD | Gjoko Zajkov |
| 7 | MF | TOG | David Henen |
| 8 | MF | IRI | Ali Gholizadeh |
| 10 | FW | IRI | Kaveh Rezaei (on loan from Club Brugge) |
| 12 | MF | BEL | Joris Kayembe |
| 13 | MF | SEN | Christophe Diandy |
| 14 | GK | SWE | Joachim Imbrechts |
| 15 | FW | BEL | Anthony Descotte |
| 16 | FW | JAM | Shamar Nicholson |
| 17 | DF | GRE | Stergos Marinos |

| No. | Pos. | Nation | Player |
|---|---|---|---|
| 18 | FW | ITA | Frank Tsadjout (on loan from Milan) |
| 22 | MF | BEL | Gaëtan Hendrickx |
| 23 | DF | FRA | Steeven Willems |
| 24 | DF | BEL | Dorian Dessoleil |
| 25 | DF | ANG | Núrio Fortuna |
| 26 | MF | MAD | Marco Ilaimaharitra |
| 27 | MF | SEN | Mamadou Fall |
| 28 | MF | BEL | Ken Nkuba |
| 40 | GK | FRA | Rémy Descamps |
| 44 | MF | JPN | Ryota Morioka |
| 70 | MF | IRI | Younes Delfi |
| 77 | MF | BEL | Massimo Bruno |

=== On loan ===
Note: Flags indicate national team as defined under FIFA eligibility rules; some limited exceptions apply. Players may hold more than one non-FIFA nationality.

| No. | Pos. | Nation | Player |
|---|---|---|---|
| 35 | GK | COD | Parfait Mandanda (at Hartford Athletic until 31 December 2020) |
| — | GK | BEL | Ilias Moutha-Sebtaoui (at F91 Dudelange until 30 June 2020) |
| — | MF | IRI | Omid Noorafkan (at Sepahan FC until 30 June 2020) |
| — | MF | BEL | Nathan Rodes (at Union Titus Pétange until 30 June 2020) |

| No. | Pos. | Nation | Player |
|---|---|---|---|
| — | FW | CMR | Arnold Garita (at US Boulogne until 30 June 2020) |
| — | FW | FRA | Jérémy Perbet (at Oud-Heverlee Leuven until 30 June 2020) |
| — | FW | MLI | Adama Niane (at KV Oostende until 30 June 2020) |

== Pre-season and friendlies ==
Win Draw Loss

| 16 July 2019 Friendly | Metz (France) | 2–1 | Charleroi | Homécourt, France |
| 18:00 CEST (UTC+2) | | Report | | Stadium: Stade Yvan Tepus |

| 7 January 2020 Friendly | 1. FC Köln (Germany) | 1–2 | Charleroi | Benidorm, Spain |
| 12:00 CET (UTC+1) | Lemperle 67' | Report | Gholizadeh 21'; Rezaei 52'; Busi (yellow card) 59'; Núrio (yellow card) 81' | Stadium: Estadio Municipal Guillermo Amor |

== Competitions ==
=== Overall record ===
| Competition | First match | Last match | Starting round | Final position | Record | | | | | | | |
| Competition | First match | Last match | Starting round | Final position | Pld | W | D | L | GF | GA | GD | Win % |
|---|---|---|---|---|---|---|---|---|---|---|---|---|
| First Division A | 28 July 2019 | 7 March 2020 | Matchday 1 | 3rd | 29 | 15 | 9 | 5 | 49 | 23 | +26 | 51.72 |
| Belgian Cup | 25 September 2019 | 17 December 2019 | Sixth round | Quarter-finals | 3 | 2 | 0 | 1 | 4 | 4 | +0 | 66.67 |
| Total | | | | | 32 | 17 | 9 | 6 | 53 | 27 | +26 | 53.13 |

Source: Soccerway

=== First Division A ===
==== League table ====
| Pos | Team | Pld | W | D | L | GF | GA | GD | Pts | Qualification or relegation |
|---|---|---|---|---|---|---|---|---|---|---|
| 1 | Club Brugge (C) | 29 | 21 | 7 | 1 | 58 | 14 | +44 | 70 | Qualification for the Champions League group stage |
| 2 | Gent | 29 | 16 | 7 | 6 | 59 | 34 | +25 | 55 | Qualification for the Champions League third qualifying round |
| 3 | Charleroi | 29 | 15 | 9 | 5 | 49 | 23 | +26 | 54 | Qualification for the Europa League third qualifying round |
| 4 | Antwerp (Y) | 29 | 15 | 8 | 6 | 49 | 32 | +17 | 53 | Qualification for the Europa League group stage (Note: Antwerp qualified for the Europa League group stage as the 2019–20 Belgian Cup winners.) |
| 5 | Standard Liège | 29 | 14 | 7 | 8 | 47 | 32 | +15 | 49 | Qualification for the Europa League second qualifying round |

Source: Belgian First Division A (in Dutch), Soccerway
Rules for classification: 1) Points; 2) Matches won; 3) Goal difference; 4) Goals scored; 5) Away goals scored; 6) Away matches won; 7) Play-off.
(C) Champions; (Y) Croky Cup winner

==== Results summary ====
| Overall | | | | | | | | Home | | | | | | Away | | | | | |
| Pld | W | D | L | GF | GA | GD | Pts | W | D | L | GF | GA | GD | W | D | L | GF | GA | GD |
|---|---|---|---|---|---|---|---|---|---|---|---|---|---|---|---|---|---|---|---|
| 26 | 12 | 7 | 7 | 42 | 33 | +9 | 43 | 5 | 4 | 4 | 16 | 13 | +3 | 7 | 3 | 3 | 26 | 20 | +6 |

Source: Jupiler Pro League

==== Results by round ====
| Round | 1 | 2 | 3 | 4 | 5 | 6 | 7 | 8 | 9 | 10 | 11 | 12 | 13 | 14 | 15 | 16 | 17 | 18 | 19 | 20 | 21 | 22 | 23 | 24 | 25 | 26 | 27 | 28 | 29 | 30 |
|---|---|---|---|---|---|---|---|---|---|---|---|---|---|---|---|---|---|---|---|---|---|---|---|---|---|---|---|---|---|---|
| Ground | H | A | H | A | H | A | H | H | A | H | A | H | A | A | A | H | A | H | A | H | A | H | A | H | A | H | A | H | A | H |
| Result | D | D | W | L | D | W | W | L | D | L | W | W | W | D | W | W | W | D | W | D | W | D | W | L | W | D | L | W | W | C |
| Position | | | | | | | | | | | | | | | | | | | | | | | | | | | | | | |

Source: Jupiler Pro League
A = Away; H = Home; W = Win; D = Draw; L = Loss

==== Matches ====
On 2 April 2020, the Jupiler Pro League's board of directors proposed to cancel the season due to the COVID-19 pandemic. The General Assembly accepted the proposal on 15 May, and officially ended the 2019–20 season.

| 28 July 2019 1 | Charleroi | 1–1 | Gent | Charleroi |
| 18:00 CEST (UTC+2) | Bruno 89' | Report | Asare (yellow card) 53'; Ngadeu-Ngadjui 56'; Plastun (yellow card) 78' | Stadium: Stade du Pays de Charleroi; Attendance: 8,760; Referee: Nicolas Laforge |

| 3 August 2019 2 | Kortrijk | 1–1 | Charleroi | Kortrijk |
| 20:00 CEST (UTC+2) | | | | Stadium: Guldensporen Stadion |

| 11 August 2019 3 | Charleroi | 2–1 | Antwerp | Charleroi |
| 18:00 CEST (UTC+2) | | | | Stadium: Stade du Pays de Charleroi |

| 19 August 2019 4 | Zulte Waregem | 3–1 | Charleroi | Waregem |
| 20:30 CEST (UTC+2) | | | | Stadium: Regenboogstadion |

| 29 January 2020 5 | Charleroi | 0–0 | Club Brugge | Charleroi |
| 20:30 CET (UTC+1) | Nicholson (yellow card) 61' | Report | Vormer (yellow card) 71'; Mata (yellow card) 86' | Stadium: Stade du Pays de Charleroi; Attendance: 12,090; Referee: Nicolas Laforge |

| 31 August 2019 6 | Waasland-Beveren | 0–4 | Charleroi | Beveren |
| 20:30 CET (UTC+1) | | | | Stadium: Freethiel Stadion |

| 13 September 2019 7 | Charleroi | 2–1 | Genk | Charleroi |
| 20:30 CEST (UTC+2) | Morioka 26' (pen.); Nicholson 29'; Ilaimaharitra (yellow card) 51'; Bruno (yellow card) 69'; Dessoleil (yellow card) 73'; Marinos (yellow card) 81'; Busi (yellow card) 85'; Rezaei (yellow card) 90+5' | Report | Onuachu 61'; Dewaest (yellow card) 74' | Stadium: Stade du Pays de Charleroi; Referee: Nathan Verboomen |

| 21 September 2019 8 | Charleroi | 0–3 | Sint-Truiden | Charleroi |
| CEST (UTC+2) | | | | Stadium: Stade du Pays de Charleroi |

| 29 September 2019 9 | Standard Liège | 1–1 | Charleroi | Liège |
| 20:00 CEST (UTC+2) | Carcela (yellow card) 59'; Amallah (yellow card) 85'; M'Poku 90' | Report | Diagne (yellow card) 2'; Ilaimaharitra (yellow card) 31' (yellow-red card) 90+3'; Morioka 45+1'; Fortuna (yellow card) 63' | Stadium: Stade Maurice Dufrasne; Attendance: 26,932; Referee: Bram Van Driessche |

| 4 October 2019 10 | Charleroi | 1–2 | Anderlecht | Charleroi |
| 20:30 CEST (UTC+2) | | | | Stadium: Stade du Pays de Charleroi; Referee: Wesley Alen |

| 20 October 2019 11 | Cercle Brugge | 0–3 | Charleroi | Brugge |
| 20:00 CEST (UTC+2) | | | | Stadium: Jan Breydel Stadium |

| 26 October 2019 12 | Charleroi | 1–0 | Excel Mouscron | Charleroi |
| 18:00 CEST (UTC+2) | | | | Stadium: Stade du Pays de Charleroi |

| 29 October 2019 13 | Oostende | 0–1 | Charleroi | Ostend |
| 20:30 CET (UTC+1) | | | | Stadium: Diaz Arena |

| 3 November 2019 14 | Mechelen | 2–2 | Charleroi | Mechelen |
| 20:00 CET (UTC+1) | | | | Stadium: Achter de Kazerne |

| 9 November 2019 15 | Charleroi | 1–0 | Eupen | Charleroi |
| 18:00 CET (UTC+1) | | | | Stadium: Stade du Pays de Charleroi |

| 24 November 2019 16 | Sint-Truiden | 1–3 | Charleroi | Sint-Truiden |
| 20:00 CET (UTC+1) | | | | Stadium: Stayen |

| 30 November 2019 17 | Charleroi | 2–0 | Waasland-Beveren | Charleroi |
| 20:00 CET (UTC+1) | | | | Stadium: Stade du Pays de Charleroi; Referee: Frederik Goldhof |

| 8 December 2019 18 | Anderlecht | 0–0 | Charleroi | Anderlecht |
| 18:00 CET (UTC+1) | | | | Stadium: Constant Vanden Stock Stadium; Referee: Bram Van Driessche |

| 14 December 2019 19 | Charleroi | 3–0 | Cercle Brugge | Charleroi |
| 20:00 CET (UTC+1) | | | | Stadium: Stade du Pays de Charleroi; Referee: Nicolas Laforge |

| 21 December 2019 20 | Excel Mouscron | 1–1 | Charleroi | Mouscron |
| 18:00 CET (UTC+1) | | | | Stadium: Stade Le Canonnier; Referee: Jasper Vergoote |

| 27 December 2019 21 | Charleroi | 5–0 | Oostende | Charleroi |
| 18:00 CET (UTC+1) | | | | Stadium: Stade du Pays de Charleroi; Referee: Wesli De Cremer |

| 18 January 2020 22 | Eupen | 1–1 | Charleroi | Eupen |
| 18:00 CET (UTC+1) | | | | Stadium: Kehrwegstadion; Referee: Wim Smet |

| 11 February 2020 23 | Charleroi | 2–1 | Mechelen | Charleroi |
| 20:30 CET (UTC+1) | | | | Stadium: Stade du Pays de Charleroi |

| 1 February 2020 24 | Genk | 1–0 | Charleroi | Genk |
| 18:00 CET (UTC+1) | Hrošovský 39'; Mæhle (yellow card) 59'; Onuachu (yellow card) 81' | Report | Willems (yellow card) 14'; Gholizadeh (yellow card) 43'; Penneteau (yellow card) 63' | Stadium: Luminus Arena; Referee: Jonathan Lardot |

| 8 February 2020 25 | Charleroi | 4–0 | Zulte Waregem | Charleroi |
| 18:00 CET (UTC+1) | | | | Stadium: Stade du Pays de Charleroi |

| 16 February 2020 26 | Antwerp | 1–1 | Charleroi | Antwerp |
| 18:00 CET (UTC+1) | | | | Stadium: Bosuilstadion |

| 23 February 2020 27 | Club Brugge | 1–0 | Charleroi | Bruges |
| 14:30 CET (UTC+1) | Álvarez 1' | Report | Ilaimaharitra (yellow card) 87' | Stadium: Jan Breydel Stadium; Attendance: 27,039; Referee: Lothar D'hondt |

| 1 March 2020 28 | Charleroi | 2–0 | Standard Liège | Charleroi |
| 18:00 CET (UTC+1) | Dessoleil 32'; Nicholson 56'; Ilaimaharitra (yellow card) 61' | Report | Laifis (yellow card) 31'; Vojvoda (yellow card) 67'; Vanheusden (yellow card) 90+1' | Stadium: Stade du Pays de Charleroi; Attendance: 13,304; Referee: Alexandre Boucaut |

| 7 March 2020 29 | Gent | 1–4 | Charleroi | Ghent |
| 20:00 CET (UTC+1) | Owusu (yellow card) 17'; Mohammadi (yellow card) 41' (yellow-red card) 84'; Niangbo 59' | Report | Nicholson 39'; Ilaimaharitra 44' (pen.); Fall 57'; Morioka (yellow card) 67'; Rezaei 89' (pen.) | Stadium: Ghelamco Arena; Attendance: 15,661; Referee: Jan Boterberg |

| 15 March 2020 30 | Charleroi | Cancelled | Kortrijk | Charleroi |
| 18:00 CET (UTC+1) | | | | Stadium: Stade du Pays de Charleroi |

=== Belgian Cup ===
| 25 September 2019 Sixth round | Rupel Boom | 2–3 | Charleroi | Boom |
| 20:00 CEST (UTC+2) | Laureys 41', 88' | Report | Rezaei 31', 86'; Gholizadeh 50' | Stadium: Gemeentelijk Parkstadion |

| 4 December 2019 Seventh round | Charleroi | 1–0 | Gent | Charleroi |
| 20:45 CET (UTC+1) | Bruno 84' | Report | | Stadium: Stade du Pays de Charleroi |

| 17 December 2019 Quarter-finals | Zulte Waregem | 2–0 | Charleroi | Waregem |
| 20:45 CET (UTC+1) | Berahino 48'; Larin 90+3' | Report | | Stadium: Regenboogstadion; Referee: Jan Boterberg |
