= Ali Gholizadeh =

Iranian footballer (born 1996)

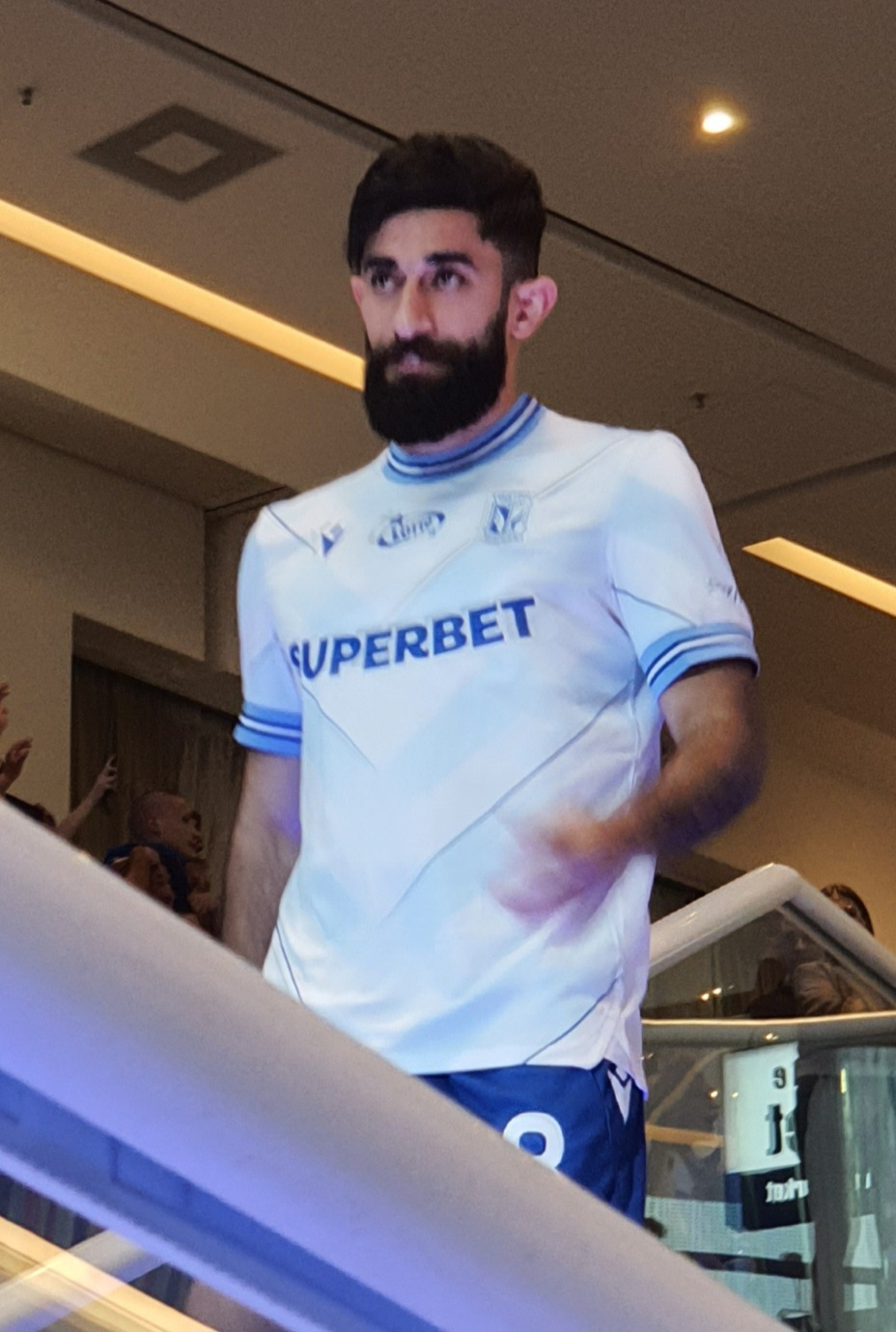
- Ali Gholizadeh with Lech Poznań in 2023

Personal information
- Full name: Ali Gholizadeh Nojedeh
- Date of birth: 10 March 1996 (age 30)
- Place of birth: Ardabil, Iran
- Height: 1.76 m (5 ft 9 in)
- Positions: Forward; winger

Team information
- Current team: Lech Poznań
- Number: 8

Youth career
- 2007–2012: Saipa

Senior career*
Years	Team	Apps	(Gls)
2013–2018	Saipa	67	(8)
2018–2023	Charleroi	134	(21)
2023	→ Kasımpaşa (loan)	4	(0)
2023–	Lech Poznań	62	(14)
2023	Lech Poznań II	1	(0)

International career^{‡}
2010–2013	Iran U17	13	(4)
2013–2015	Iran U20	1	(1)
2017	Iran U21	2	(1)
2017	Iran U23	3	(1)
2018–	Iran	44	(7)
- * Club domestic league appearances and goals as of 13:35, 4 May 2026 (UTC) ‡ National team caps and goals as of 17:46, 31 March 2026 (UTC)

Ali Gholizadeh Nojedeh (Persian: علی قلی‌زاده, romanized: 'Ali Qolizâde; born 10 March 1996) is an Iranian professional footballer who plays as a winger for Ekstraklasa club Lech Poznań and the Iran national team.

Gholizadeh is a product of the Saipa youth system and broke into the club's first team at 18. He went on to play for five seasons at Saipa before transferring to Belgian side Charleroi in 2018. He has represented Iran at every level, debuting for the senior national team in March 2018 under then-head coach Carlos Queiroz.

== Club career ==
=== Saipa ===
Gholizadeh started his career with Saipa youth levels. He was promoted to the first team by Engin Firat and made his debut for Saipa in last fixture of 2013–14 Iran Pro League against Saba Qom as a substitute. After scoring six times in 28 games, Gholizadeh was named the Persian Gulf Pro League Young Player of the Season for 2017–18.

=== Charleroi ===
On 30 May 2018, Gholizadeh joined Belgian First Division A club Charleroi, joining compatriot Omid Noorafkan. Gholizadeh scored his first goal for the club on 25 November 2018 in a league match against Lokeren. In January 2020, Gholizadeh extended his contract with Charleroi until June 2024.

==== Loan to Kasımpaşa ====
On 2 February 2023, Gholizadeh was loaned to Kasımpaşa in Turkey, with an option to buy.

=== Lech Poznań ===
On 10 July 2023, Polish Ekstraklasa side Lech Poznań announced the signing of Gholizadeh on a three-year contract, for a reported club record fee of approximately €1.8 million. Initially expected to make a debut in August that year, his prolonged recovery from a knee injury suffered in March kept Gholizadeh out of play until 31 October, when he entered the pitch in the 65th minute of a 0–4 away win over Zawisza Bydgoszcz in the round of 32 of the Polish Cup. After suffering another knee injury which required surgery in a goalless draw against Stal Mielec on 1 April 2024, Gholizadeh was ruled out for the remainder of the season. Overall, in his first season in Poland, he made a total of 13 appearances across all competitions, without scoring or providing an assist.

In his second season with the club, Gholizadeh was mainly used as a substitute in the early stages before establishing himself as a starter in Niels Frederiksen's line-up in late 2024. He scored eight goals and made five assists in 33 league appearances as Lech won their ninth Ekstraklasa title at the end of the season.

A rocky start to the 2025–26 campaign saw Gholizadeh sidelined for three months after picking up a thigh injury in mid-August. After recovering, Gholizadeh returned to the starting line-up. In the following months, he scored six league goals and provided four assists, and was named Ekstraklasa's Player of the Month in April for his efforts. On 2 May 2026, Gholizadeh tore his ACL during a 1–0 win over Motor Lublin, causing his season to end prematurely. Despite the injury, he signed a new one-year contract with Lech on 13 May.

== International career ==
=== Youth ===
Gholizadeh was part of Iran U17 in 2012 AFC U-16 Championship and 2013 FIFA U-17 World Cup. He invited to Iran U20 by Ali Dousti Mehr to preparation for 2014 AFC U-19 Championship.

=== Senior ===
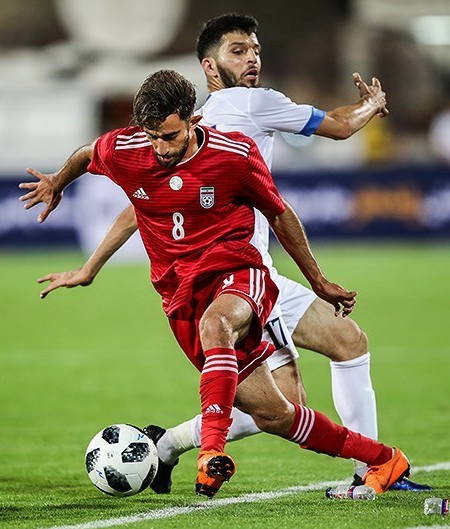
Gholizadeh with Iran in 2018

Gholizadeh debuted for the Iran national team on 17 March 2018 against Sierra Leone and scored two goals. In May 2018, he was named in Team Melli's preliminary squad for the 2018 FIFA World Cup in Russia. In November 2022, he was named by Carlos Queiroz in Iran's final squad which would compete for the 2022 World Cup in Qatar.

== Personal life ==
Gholizadeh married fellow Iranian footballer Yasaman Farmani in February 2019.

On 8 February 2026, in light of the 2025–2026 Iranian protests, wrote in response to the protests' high casualty rate: "Stop writing 'homeland' with a 'T'. Many bodies have died in its arms."

== Career statistics ==
=== Club ===
As of match played 2 May 2026

Appearances and goals by club, season and competition
Club	Season	League			National cup (Note: Includes Hazfi Cup, Belgian Cup, Polish Cup)		Continental		Other		Total	
Club	Season	Division	Apps	Goals	Apps	Goals	Apps	Goals	Apps	Goals	Apps	Goals
Saipa	2013–14	Persian Gulf Pro League	1	0	0	0	—		—		1	0
Saipa	2014–15	Persian Gulf Pro League	3	0	0	0	—		—		3	0
Saipa	2015–16	Persian Gulf Pro League	12	1	1	0	—		—		13	1
Saipa	2016–17	Persian Gulf Pro League	23	1	2	0	—		—		25	1
Saipa	2017–18	Persian Gulf Pro League	28	6	1	0	—		—		29	6
Saipa	Total		67	8	4	0	0	0	0	0	71	8
Charleroi	2018–19	Belgian First Division A	22	1	1	1	—		0	0	23	2
Charleroi	2019–20	Belgian First Division A	22	3	3	1	—		—		25	4
Charleroi	2020–21	Belgian First Division A	34	8	1	0	2 (Note: Appearances in UEFA Europa League)	0	—		37	8
Charleroi	2021–22	Belgian First Division A	36	8	1	0	—		—		37	8
Charleroi	2022–23	Belgian First Division A	20	1	1	0	—		—		21	1
Charleroi	Total		134	21	7	2	2	0	0	0	143	23
Kasımpaşa (loan)	2022–23	Süper Lig	4	0	—		—		0	0	4	0
Lech Poznań	2023–24	Ekstraklasa	10	0	2	0	0	0	—		12	0
Lech Poznań	2024–25	Ekstraklasa	33	8	1	0	—		—		34	8
Lech Poznań	2025–26	Ekstraklasa	19	6	2	0	8 (Note: Two appearances in UEFA Champions League, six appearances in UEFA Conference League)	0	0	0	29	6
Lech Poznań	2026–27	Ekstraklasa	0	0	0	0	0	0	0	0	0	0
Lech Poznań	Total		62	14	5	0	8	0	0	0	75	14
Lech Poznań II	2023–24	II liga	1	0	0	0	—		—		1	0
Career total			268	43	16	2	10	0	0	0	294	45

=== International ===
As of match played 31 March 2026

Appearances and goals by national team and year
National team	Year	Apps	Goals
Iran
Iran	2018	6	3
Iran	2020	2	0
Iran	2021	11	3
Iran	2022	10	0
Iran	2023	1	0
Iran	2024	10	0
Iran	2025	2	0
Iran	2026	2	1
Total		44	7

Scores and results list Iran's goal tally first, score column indicates score after each Gholizadeh goal.

List of international goals scored by Ali Gholizadeh
No	Date	Venue	Opponent	Score	Result	Competition
1	17 March 2018	Azadi Stadium, Tehran, Iran	Sierra Leone	2–0	4–0	Friendly
2	17 March 2018	Azadi Stadium, Tehran, Iran	Sierra Leone	4–0	4–0	Friendly
3	20 November 2018	Hamad bin Khalifa Stadium, Doha, Qatar	Venezuela	1–1	1–1	Friendly
4	3 June 2021	Al Muharraq Stadium, Arad, Bahrain	Hong Kong	1–0	3–1	2022 FIFA World Cup qualification
5	7 September 2021	Khalifa International Stadium, Doha, Qatar	Iraq	3–0	3–0	2022 FIFA World Cup qualification
6	16 November 2021	King Abdullah II Stadium, Amman, Jordan	Syria	3–0	3–0	2022 FIFA World Cup qualification
7	31 March 2026	Corendon Airlines Park, Antalya, Turkey	Costa Rica	1–0	5–0	2026 Jordan International Tournament

== Honours ==
Lech Poznań

- Ekstraklasa: 2024–25, 2025–26

Individual

- Iranian Young Player of the Year: 2017–18
- Ekstraklasa Player of the Month: May 2025, April 2026
