= Núrio Fortuna =

Angolan footballer (born 1995)

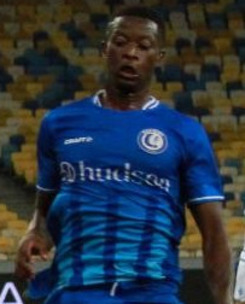

Personal information
- Full name: Núrio Domingos Matias Fortuna
- Date of birth: 24 March 1995 (age 31)
- Place of birth: Luanda, Angola
- Height: 1.77 m (5 ft 10 in)
- Position: Left-back

Team information
- Current team: Petro Atlético
- Number: 2

Youth career
- 2005–2007: Núcleo Sintra
- 2008: Benfica
- 2008–2011: Real Massamá
- 2011–2012: Sporting CP
- 2012–2014: Braga

Senior career*
Years	Team	Apps	(Gls)
2013–2016	Braga B	86	(1)
2014–2017	Braga	7	(0)
2016–2017	→ AEL Limassol (loan)	33	(0)
2017–2020	Charleroi	67	(1)
2020–2026	Gent	79	(4)
2025	→ Dunkerque (loan)	5	(0)
2025–2026	→ Volos (loan)	18	(1)
2026–	Petro Atlético		

International career^{‡}
2019–	Angola	28	(1)
- * Club domestic league appearances and goals as of 00:05, 24 March 2026 (UTC) ‡ National team caps and goals as of 18:10, 29 December 2025 (UTC)

Núrio Domingos Matias Fortuna (born 24 March 1995) is an Angolan professional footballer who plays as a left-back for Girabola club Atlético Petróleos de Luanda and the Angola national team.

== Club career ==
=== Braga ===
Fortuna was born in Luanda. Having played for five Portuguese clubs as a youth, he finished his development at S.C. Braga.

Fortuna spent three full seasons in the Segunda Liga with the reserve team. He made his debut in the competition on 21 August 2013, coming on as a second-half substitute in a 2–0 home win against C.F. União.

In one week in February 2014, Fortuna played his first match with the main squad in three different competitions. He started in the Taça de Portugal against C.D. Aves (3–1 win, after extra time), doing the same in the 4–1 Primeira Liga victory over Gil Vicente F.C. and the 2–1 away loss to Rio Ave F.C. in the semi-finals of the Taça da Liga.

On 14 June 2016, Fortuna was loaned to AEL Limassol of the Cypriot First Division.

=== Belgium ===
In the summer of 2017, Fortuna signed a three-year contract with Royal Charleroi SC with a two-year option. He scored his first goal in the Belgian Pro League on 4 May 2019, in the 2–0 home defeat of Sint-Truidense VV.

Fortuna joined KAA Gent of the same country and league on 25 June 2020, for a fee of €6 million. He contributed four appearances in the 2021–22 edition of the Belgian Cup; this included an injury-time one in the penalty shoot-out win over RSC Anderlecht in the final.

On 3 February 2025, Fortuna was loaned to USL Dunkerque of French Ligue 2 until the end of the season. Still owned by Gent, he represented Volos F.C. in the 2025–26 season on another temporary deal, terminating his contract at his parent club in April 2026.

=== Later career ===
On 16 May 2026, Fortuna returned to Angola on a deal at Atlético Petróleos de Luanda.

== International career ==
In September 2015, shortly after having received his Portuguese passport, Fortuna was called by Portugal under-21 manager Rui Jorge for a 2017 UEFA European Championship qualifier against Albania. He never played any matches for the country at that or any other level, however.

Fortuna won his first cap for Angola on 6 September 2019, featuring the entire 1−0 away win over Gambia for the 2022 FIFA World Cup qualifying stage. He scored his first goal on 10 January 2024, closing the 3−0 friendly victory against Bahrain in Dubai.

Fortuna was included in the squads for the 2023 and 2025 Africa Cup of Nations.

== Career statistics ==
As of 23 May 2025

Appearances and goals by club, season and competition
Club	Season	League			National Cup (Note: Includes Taça de Portugal, Belgian Cup)		League Cup (Note: Includes Taça da Liga)		Europe		Other		Total	
Club	Season	Division	Apps	Goals	Apps	Goals	Apps	Goals	Apps	Goals	Apps	Goals	Apps	Goals
Braga	2013–14	Primeira Liga	6	0	1	0	1	0	0	0	—		8	0
Braga	2014–15	Primeira Liga	1	0	0	0	0	0	—		—		1	0
Braga	Total		7	0	1	0	1	0	0	0	—		9	0
Braga B	2013–14	Liga Portugal 2	19	0	—		—		—		—		19	0
Braga B	2014–15	Liga Portugal 2	32	0	—		—		—		—		32	0
Braga B	2015–16	Liga Portugal 2	35	1	—		—		—		—		35	1
Braga B	Total		86	1	—		—		—		—		86	1
AEL Limassol (loan)	2016–17	Cypriot First Division	33	0	—		—		—		—		33	0
Charleroi	2017–18	Belgian Pro League	18	0	1	0	—		—		8 (Note: Appearances in Belgian Pro League play-offs)	0	27	0
Charleroi	2018–19	Belgian Pro League	21	0	1	0	—		—		10	1	32	1
Charleroi	2019–20	Belgian Pro League	28	1	3	0	—		—		—		31	1
Charleroi	Total		67	1	5	0	—		—		18	1	90	2
Gent	2020–21	Belgian Pro League	25	1	2	0	—		8 (Note: Two appearances in UEFA Champions League, six appearances and one goal in UEFA Europa League)	1	1	0	36	2
Gent	2021–22	Belgian Pro League	27	2	4	0	—		10 (Note: Appearances in UEFA Conference League)	0	5	0	46	2
Gent	2022–23	Belgian Pro League	15	1	1	0	—		11 (Note: One appearance in UEFA Europa League, ten appearances in UEFA Conference League)	0	2 (Note: One appearance in Belgian Pro League play-offs, one appearance in Belgian Super Cup)	0	29	1
Gent	2023–24	Belgian Pro League	10	0	2	0	—		6	0	5 (Note: Four appearances in Belgian Pro League Europe play-offs, one appearance in European competition play-offs)	0	23	0
Gent	2024–25	Belgian Pro League	2	0	0	0	—		4	0	0	0	6	0
Gent	Total		79	4	9	0	—		39	1	13	0	140	5
Dunkerque (loan)	2024–25	Ligue 2	5	0	0	0	—		—		0	0	5	0
Career total			277	6	15	0	1	0	39	1	31	1	363	8

== Honours ==
Gent

- Belgian Cup: 2021–22

Petro Atlético

- Supertaça de Angola: 2026
