= Shamar Nicholson =

Jamaican footballer (born 1997)

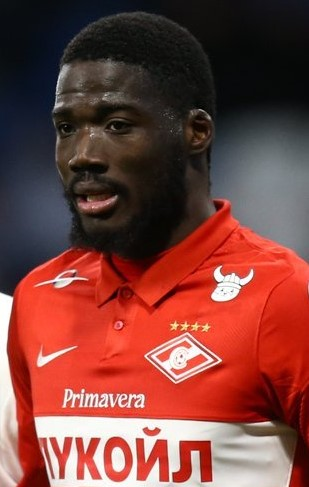
- Nicholson with Spartak Moscow in 2022

Personal information
- Full name: Shamar Amaro Nicholson
- Date of birth: 16 March 1997 (age 29)
- Place of birth: Kingston, Jamaica
- Height: 1.92 m (6 ft 4 in)
- Position: Forward

Team information
- Current team: Tijuana

Youth career
- 2011–2014: Trench Town High School

Senior career*
Years	Team	Apps	(Gls)
2014–2017	Boys' Town	75	(28)
2017–2019	Domžale	47	(18)
2019–2021	Charleroi	76	(30)
2022–2025	Spartak Moscow	43	(11)
2023–2024	→ Clermont (loan)	26	(4)
2025–	Tijuana	18	(2)
2026	→ Maxline Vitebsk (loan)	13	(0)

International career^{‡}
2015	Jamaica U20	1	(0)
2017–	Jamaica	62	(21)
Medal record
Men's football
Representing Jamaica
CONCACAF Gold Cup
Runner-up	2017 United States	Team
CONCACAF Nations League
Bronze medal – third place	2024 United States	Team
- * Club domestic league appearances and goals as of 25 September 2026 ‡ National team caps and goals as of 23:00, 18 November 2025 (UTC)

Shamar Amaro Nicholson (born 16 March 1997) is a Jamaican professional footballer who plays as a forward for Liga MX club Tijuana. He also plays for the Jamaica national team.

== Club career ==
=== Boys' Town ===
Nicholson was developed in the Boys' Town youth system and made the transition to the first team in 2015–16. He had a trial with Real Salt Lake in 2015, but it was ultimately decided that he would stay with Boys' Town Nicholson played 75 matches for the team, scoring 28 goals.

=== Domžale ===
In September 2017, Nicholson signed with Domžale in Slovenia. He ultimately played 47 league matches and scored 18 goals.

=== Charleroi ===
Nicholson joined Belgian club Charleroi in August 2019, signing a four-year deal. Prior to his departure in 2021, Nicholson played more league games for Charleroi than for any other club in his career. He scored 30 goals in the competition.

=== Spartak Moscow ===
On 21 December 2021, Nicholson signed for Russian Premier League club Spartak Moscow on a four-and-a-half-year contract. He scored his first hat-trick on 2 March 2022, in his second game for the club during a 6–1 Cup win over PFC Kuban Krasnodar. He also went on to win the Russian Cup that season in a 2–1 win over Dynamo Moscow.

On 1 September 2023, hours before the closing of the summer transfer window, Nicholson made a loan move to Clermont of Ligue 1.

Nicholson's contract with Spartak was terminated by mutual consent on 2 February 2025.

=== Tijuana ===
On 5 February 2025, Nicholson signed with Tijuana in Mexico.

== International career ==
Nicholson played for the Jamaica U20 national team at the 2015 CONCACAF U-20 Championship.

He made his senior national team debut in February 2017. Nicholson scored his first goal for Jamaica on 5 June 2019 in a friendly against the United States.

== Career statistics ==
=== Club ===
As of match played 4 July 2026

Appearances and goals by club, season and competition
Club	Season	League			National cup (Note: Includes Slovenian Cup, Belgian Cup, Russian Cup, Coupe de France, Belarusian Cup)		Continental		Other		Total	
Club	Season	Division	Apps	Goals	Apps	Goals	Apps	Goals	Apps	Goals	Apps	Goals
Boys' Town	2014–15	National Premier League	20	7			—		—		20	7
Boys' Town	2015–16	National Premier League	24	6			—		—		24	6
Boys' Town	2016–17	National Premier League	31	15			—		—		31	15
Boys' Town	Total		75	28			—		—		75	28
Domžale	2017–18	Slovenian PrvaLiga	15	5	—		—		—		15	5
Domžale	2018–19	Slovenian PrvaLiga	29	13	2	0	4	0	—		35	13
Domžale	2019–20	Slovenian PrvaLiga	3	0	—		3 (Note: Appearances in UEFA Europa League)	2	—		6	2
Domžale	Total		47	18	2	0	7	2	—		56	20
Charleroi	2019–20	Belgian Pro League	25	8	3	0	—		—		28	8
Charleroi	2020–21	Belgian Pro League	33	9	2	1	2	0	—		37	10
Charleroi	2021–22	Belgian Pro League	18	13	0	0	—		—		18	13
Charleroi	Total		76	30	5	1	2	0	—		83	31
Spartak Moscow	2021–22	Russian Premier League	12	5	4	3	—		—		16	8
Spartak Moscow	2022–23	Russian Premier League	22	3	4	1	—		1 (Note: Appearance in Russian Super Cup)	0	27	4
Spartak Moscow	2024–25	Russian Premier League	9	3	5	1	—		—		14	4
Spartak Moscow	Total		43	11	13	5	—		1	0	57	16
Clermont (loan)	2023–24	Ligue 1	26	4	2	0	—		—		28	4
Tijuana	2024–25	Liga MX	9	1	—		—		—		9	1
Tijuana	2025–26	Liga MX	9	1	—		—		3 (Note: Appearances in Leagues Cup)	0	12	1
Tijuana	Total		18	2	—		—		3	0	21	2
Maxline Vitebsk (loan)	2026	Belarusian Premier League	13	0	3	0	—		—		16	0
Career total			298	93	25	6	9	2	4	0	336	101

=== International ===
As of match played 18 November 2025

Appearances and goals by national team and year
National team	Year	Apps	Goals
Jamaica	2017	6	0
Jamaica	2019	12	7
Jamaica	2021	11	3
Jamaica	2022	3	0
Jamaica	2023	14	6
Jamaica	2024	10	3
Jamaica	2025	6	2
Total		62	21

Scores and results list Jamaica's goal tally first, score column indicates score after each Nicholson goal.

List of international goals scored by Shamar Nicholson
No.	Date	Venue	Opponent	Score	Result	Competition
1	5 June 2019	Audi Field, Washington, D.C., United States	United States	1–0	1–0	Friendly
2	25 June 2019	Banc of California Stadium, Los Angeles, United States	Curaçao	1–0	1–1	2019 CONCACAF Gold Cup
3	3 July 2019	Nissan Stadium, Nashville, United States	United States	1–2	1–3	2019 CONCACAF Gold Cup
4	6 September 2019	Montego Bay Sports Complex, Montego Bay, Jamaica	Antigua and Barbuda	1–0	6–0	2019–20 CONCACAF Nations League B
5	6 September 2019	Montego Bay Sports Complex, Montego Bay, Jamaica	Antigua and Barbuda	3–0	6–0	2019–20 CONCACAF Nations League B
6	12 October 2019	Independence Park, Kingston, Jamaica	Aruba	2–0	2–0	2019–20 CONCACAF Nations League B
7	15 October 2019	Ergilio Hato Stadium, Willemstad, Curaçao	Aruba	4–0	6–0	2019–20 CONCACAF Nations League B
8	12 July 2021	Exploria Stadium, Orlando, United States	Suriname	1–0	2–0	2021 CONCACAF Gold Cup
9	2 September 2021	Estadio Azteca, Mexico City, Mexico	Mexico	1–1	1–2	2022 FIFA World Cup qualification
10	8 September 2021	Estadio Nacional, San José, Costa Rica	Costa Rica	1–1	1–1	2022 FIFA World Cup qualification
11	15 June 2023	Wiener Neustadt Ergo Arena, Wiener Neustadt, Austria	Qatar	0–1	1–1	Friendly
12	13 October 2023	Kirani James Athletic Stadium, St. George's, Grenada	Grenada	3–1	4–1	2023–24 CONCACAF Nations League A
13	16 October 2023	Trinidad Stadium, Port of Spain, Trinidad and Tobago	Haiti	3–2	3–2	2023–24 CONCACAF Nations League A
14	18 November 2023	Independence Park, Kingston, Jamaica	Canada	1–1	1–2	2023–24 CONCACAF Nations League A
15	21 November 2023	BMO Field, Toronto, Canada	Canada	1–1	3–2	2023–24 CONCACAF Nations League A
16	21 November 2023	BMO Field, Toronto, Canada	Canada	2–1	3–2	2023–24 CONCACAF Nations League A
17	6 June 2024	Independence Park, Kingston, Jamaica	Dominican Republic	1–0	1–0	2026 FIFA World Cup qualification
18	9 June 2024	Windsor Park, Roseau, Dominica	Dominica	1–0	3–2	2026 FIFA World Cup qualification
19	9 June 2024	Windsor Park, Roseau, Dominica	Dominica	3–0	3–2	2026 FIFA World Cup qualification
20	6 September 2025	Bermuda National Stadium, Hamilton, Bermuda	Bermuda	1–0	4–0	2026 FIFA World Cup qualification
21	14 October 2025	Independence Park, Kingston, Jamaica	Bermuda	3–0	4–0	2026 FIFA World Cup qualification

== Honours ==
Spartak Moscow

- Russian Cup: 2021–22

Jamaica

- CONCACAF Gold Cup runner-up: 2017
- Caribbean Cup runner-up: 2017
