= Cristian Benavente =

Peruvian footballer (born 1994)

Personal information
- Full name: Cristian Benavente Bristol
- Date of birth: 19 May 1994 (age 32)
- Place of birth: Alcalá de Henares, Spain
- Height: 1.72 m (5 ft 8 in)
- Position: Attacking midfielder

Team information
- Current team: Sporting Cristal
- Number: 14

Youth career
- 1999–2000: Vallecana
- 2000–2002: Santa Eugenia
- 2002–2013: Real Madrid

Senior career*
Years	Team	Apps	(Gls)
2013–2015	Real Madrid B	33	(3)
2015–2016	Milton Keynes Dons	2	(0)
2016–2019	Charleroi	77	(21)
2019–2022	Pyramids	12	(3)
2019–2020	→ Nantes (loan)	12	(0)
2020–2021	→ Antwerp (loan)	9	(2)
2021	→ Charleroi (loan)	3	(0)
2022–2023	Alianza Lima	26	(6)
2024–2025	Universidad César Vallejo	5	(0)
2024–2025	→ Sport Boys (loan)	8	(0)
2025	Gloria Buzău	9	(0)
2025-	Sporting Cristal	13	(1)

International career^{‡}
2010–2011	Peru U17	4	(0)
2013	Peru U20	9	(2)
2013–2019	Peru	19	(2)
- * Club domestic league appearances and goals as of 3 March 2026 ‡ National team caps and goals as of 15 November 2019

Cristian Benavente Bristol (born 19 May 1994) is a Peruvian professional footballer who plays as an attacking midfielder for Sporting Cristal. Born in Spain, he played for the Peru national team.

== Club career ==
=== Real Madrid ===
Born in Alcalá de Henares, to Peruvian parents of Quechua descent. Benavente joined Real Madrid's youth system in 2002, aged 8. In the 2013 summer, while still a junior, he was named to Real Madrid Castilla's pre-season squad for the 2012–13 season. In the same campaign he also was Juvenil A topscorer, netting 18 goals.

In July 2013, Benavente was promoted to Castilla, and made his professional debut on 24 August, playing the last 11 minutes of a 0–1 home loss against AD Alcorcón, in the Segunda División championship.

=== Milton Keynes Dons ===
On 17 July 2015, Benavente joined English Championship club Milton Keynes Dons, signing a two-year deal on a free transfer. On 11 August 2015, Benavente made his debut in a 2–1 League Cup first round win over Leyton Orient. On 5 January 2016, following limited first team opportunities, Benavente was released from the club.

=== Charleroi ===
Benavente then signed for Belgian club Charleroi in 2016.

=== Pyramids ===
In January 2019, he moved to Egyptian club Pyramids FC.

=== Nantes ===
In August 2019, he was loaned to French club FC Nantes

=== Royal Antwerp ===
In October 2020, he was loaned out to Belgian side Royal Antwerp On 31 January 2021, Benavente left Royal Antwerp, due to a lack of playing time.

=== Charleroi ===
On 1 February 2021, Benavente moved to Belgium club Charleroi, on a loan deal with an option to buy.

=== Alianza Lima ===
On 2 February 2022, Benavente was signed for Peruvian club Alianza Lima, signing a one-year contract. He scored a free kick in his debut.

=== Later career ===
On 4 January 2024, Benanvente joined Universidad César Vallejo after a year of inactivity due to a knee injury. On 26 December, he was loaned out to Sport Boys, after Universidad César Vallejo was relegated.

On 14 February 2025, Benavente joined Romanian club Gloria Buzău on a short term contract until the end of the season. On 8 August, he returned to Perú, joining Sporting Cristal and signing a contract until December 2026.

== International career ==
After appearing with the under-17 and under-20 teams, Benavente made his full squad debut on 18 April 2013, as a half-time substitute in a 0–0 friendly draw against Mexico at Candlestick Park in San Francisco. He scored his first international goal on 1 June 2013, the winner in a 2–1 victory over Panama.

== Personal life ==
His mother, Magali Bristol, was a retired volleyball player for Peru's U15 and U20 teams, and is a part owner of Zest nightclub in Ipswich.

== Career statistics ==
=== Club ===
As of 3 March 2026

Appearances and goals by club, season and competition
Club	Season	League			Cup (Note: Appearances in Belgian Cup, English League Cup, and Coupe de la Ligue)		Other		Total	
Club	Season	Division	Apps	Goals	Apps	Goals	Apps	Goals	Apps	Goals
Real Madrid Castilla	2013–14	Segunda División	8	0	—		—		8	0
Real Madrid Castilla	2014–15	Segunda División B	25	3	—		—		25	3
Real Madrid Castilla	Total		33	3	—		—		33	3
Milton Keynes Dons	2015–16	Championship	2	0	—		3 (Note: Appearances in EFL Cup)	0	5	0
Charleroi	2015–16	Belgian Pro League	9	2	—		2 (Note: Appearances in Belgian Pro League European play-offs)	0	11	2
Charleroi	2016–17	Belgian First Division A	19	2	3	2	6 (Note: Appearances in Belgian First Division A Championship play-offs)	2	28	6
Charleroi	2017–18	Belgian First Division A	27	8	3	2	9	1	39	11
Charleroi	2018–19	Belgian First Division A	22	9	2	1	—		24	10
Charleroi	Total		77	21	8	5	17	3	102	29
Pyramids	2018–19	Egyptian Premier League	12	3	—		—		12	3
Nantes (loan)	2019–20	Ligue 1	12	0	0	0	1 (Note: Appearances in Coupe de la Ligue)	0	13	0
Antwerp (loan)	2020–21	Belgian First Division A	9	2	—		6 (Note: Appearances in UEFA Europa League)	0	15	2
Charleroi (loan)	2020–21	Belgian First Division A	3	0	2	0	—		5	0
Alianza Lima	2022	Peruvian Primera División	26	6	—		4 (Note: Appearances in Copa Libertadores)	0	30	6
Universidad César Vallejo	2024	Peruvian Primera División	5	0	—		3 (Note: Appearances in Copa Sudamericana)	0	8	0
Sport Boys (loan)	2024	Peruvian Primera División	8	0	—		—		8	0
Gloria Buzău	2024–25	Liga I	9	0	—		—		9	0
Sporting Cristal	2025	Peruvian Primera División	11	1	—		—		11	1
Sporting Cristal	2026	Peruvian Primera División	2	0	—		1	0	3	0
Sporting Cristal	Total		13	1	0	0	1	0	14	1
Career total			163	29	12	5	18	3	194	37

=== International ===
As of match played 15 November 2019

Appearances and goals by national team and year
National team	Year	Apps	Goals
Peru
Peru	2013	4	1
Peru	2014	4	0
Peru	2015	1	0
Peru	2016	5	1
Peru	2017	0	0
Peru	2018	4	0
Peru	2019	1	0
Total		19	2

Scores and results list Peru' goal tally first, score column indicates score after each Benavente goal.

List of international goals scored by Cristian Benavente
No.	Date	Venue	Opponent	Score	Result	Competition
1	1 June 2013	Estadio Rommel Fernández, Panama City, Panama	Panama	2–1	2–1	Friendly
2	23 May 2016	Estadio Nacional, Lima, Peru	Trinidad and Tobago	4–0	4–0	Friendly
