= Stergos Marinos =

Greek footballer

Personal information
- Date of birth: 17 September 1987 (age 39)
- Place of birth: Kos, Greece
- Height: 1.78 m (5 ft 10 in)
- Position: Right-back

Youth career
- 2001–2004: Asklipios Ko
- 2004–2005: Chalkidona

Senior career*
Years	Team	Apps	(Gls)
2005–2009	Atromitos	38	(0)
2009–2013	Panathinaikos	77	(1)
2013–2020	Charleroi	170	(4)

International career
2005	Greece U19	1	(0)
2010	Greece	1	(0)
Medal record
Atromitos
Gold medal – first place	Beta Ethniki	2009
Panathinaikos
Gold medal – first place	Super League Greece	2010
Gold medal – first place	Greek Cup	2010
- * Club domestic league appearances and goals

Stergos Marinos (Greek: Στέργος Μαρίνος; born 17 September 1987) is a Greek former professional footballer who played as a right-back.

== Club career ==
=== Youth career & Atromitos ===
He was born on the Greek island of Kos and started his career in 2001 at local team Asklipios Ko. In 2004, he moved to Nikea-based club Chalkidona and when Chalkidona merged with Atromitos, he was transferred to the latter.

Marinos won the 2008–09 Beta Ethniki championship with Atromitos.

=== Panathinaikos ===
On 24 August 2009, Marinos signed a contract with Panathinaikos as a replacement for Bryce Moon, who was sent away on loan to PAOK the same year. It was agreed that Atromitos would receive a fee of €200K. He joined Panathinaikos a week later, on 31 August, and made his league debut on 13 September 2009 in an away game against Panthrakikos, playing a full 90 minutes.

He was a member of the Panathinaikos team that won the double in 2010.

=== Charleroi ===
On 14 July 2013 Marinos signed a two-year contract for an undisclosed fee with the Belgian club Charleroi. He made his debut with the club on 17 August 2013 in a 1–2 home loss against Kortrijk and scored his first goal on 29 November 2014 in a 2–3 away win against Westerlo. On 12 August 2015, after a remarkable year with the club, Marinos extended his contract till the summer 2018. He returned to the squad after three months playing as a starter in a 3–2 home loss against Waasland-Beveren. On 21 April 2016, almost at the end of the 2015–16 season, Frédéric Borlée, doctor of the club, summarises the doctoral report:" He suffers from the disease of Haglund . Basically, it has a bony outgrowth at the back of the calcaneus (heel) which caused partial rupture of the Achilles tendon. The operation is necessary." Furthermore, "...the Greek midfielder had several injuries in the last few months and his return to the squad should not occur before 4–5 months", the doctor concluded. Marinos will therefore miss the summer preparation as well as the beginning of 2016–17 season. After a very difficult period for the defender marred by injury (252 days to be exact), on 17 December 2016, he returned to the squad as a starter in a 2–0 home win against Royal Excel Mouscron. On 19 February 2017, in a 1–1 away draw against rivals K.R.C. Genk, he scored his first goal in the season as a substitute, helping his club to climb in the 5th position of the League. He started the 2017–18 season as a starter. On 1 December 2017, in a home game draw against rivals K.V. Oostende reached 100 League appearances with the club's jersey. On 28 March 2018, during an impressive season, Marinos renew his contract with Charleroi for three years (plus an optional year) for an undisclosed fee.

== International career ==
Marinos was a Greece U19 international. In 2010, he was called up to the Greece national team by Otto Rehhagel however did not make an appearance. He was called again by Fernando Santos and he made his debut for Greece on 11 August 2010 during a friendly match against Serbia, coming as a late substitute.

== Club statistics ==
As of 11 February 2020

Club performance			League		Cup		Europe		Total	
Season	Club	League	Apps	Goals	Apps	Goals	Apps	Goals	Apps	Goals
Greece			League		Greek Cup		Europe		Total	
2005–06	Atromitos	Super League Greece	3	0	–		–		3	0
2006–07	Atromitos	Super League Greece	5	0	–		–		5	0
2007–08	Atromitos	Super League Greece	16	0	–		–		16	0
2008–09	Atromitos	Beta Ethniki	12	0	–		–		12	0
2009–10	Atromitos	Super League Greece	2	0	–		–		2	0
2009–10	Panathinaikos	Super League Greece	9	0	1	0	3	0	13	0
2010–11	Panathinaikos	Super League Greece	26	0	2	0	6	0	34	0
2011–12	Panathinaikos	Super League Greece	21	0	1	0	2	0	24	0
2012–13	Panathinaikos	Super League Greece	21	1	2	0	5	0	28	1
Belgium			Pro League		Belgian Cup		Europe		Total	
2013–14	Charleroi	Belgian Pro League	17	0	1	0	0	0	18	0
2014–15	Charleroi	Belgian Pro League	35	3	3	0	0	0	38	3
2015–16	Charleroi	Belgian Pro League	20	0	0	0	4	0	24	0
2016–17	Charleroi	Belgian Pro League	11	1	0	0	0	0	11	1
2017–18	Charleroi	Belgian Pro League	39	0	3	0	0	0	42	0
2018–19	Charleroi	Belgian Pro League	37	0	1	0	0	0	38	0
2019–20	Charleroi	Belgian Pro League	11	0	1	0	0	0	12	0
Career total			285	4	14	0	20	0	319	4

== Honours ==
=== Atromitos ===
- Beta Ethniki: 2008–09

=== Panathinaikos ===
- Super League Greece: 2009–10
- Greek Football Cup: 2009–10
