= Marco Ilaimaharitra =

Malagasy footballer (born 1995)

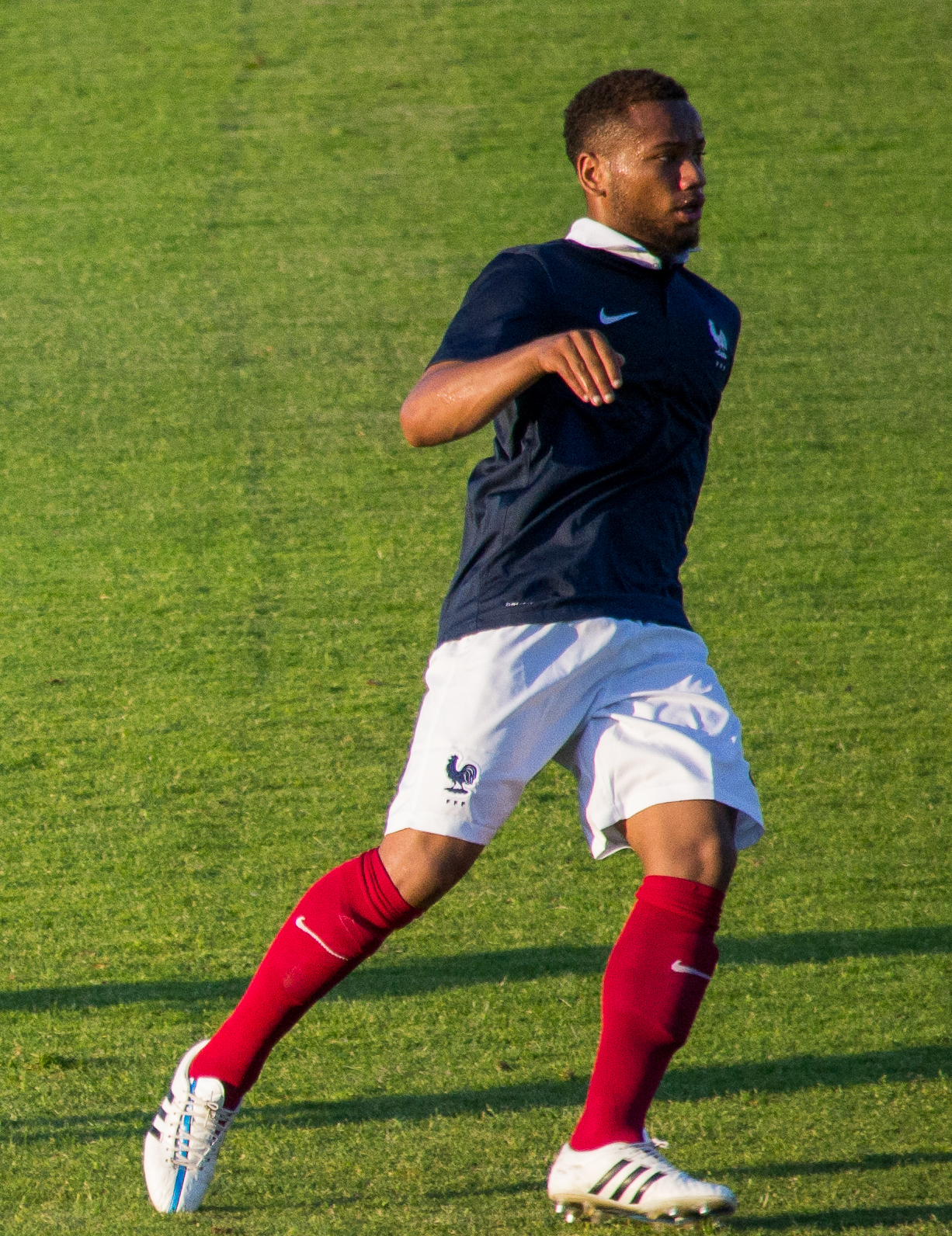
- Ilaimaharitra in 2015

Personal information
- Date of birth: 26 July 1995 (age 31)
- Place of birth: Mulhouse, France
- Height: 1.77 m (5 ft 10 in)
- Position: Defensive midfielder

Team information
- Current team: Standard Liège
- Number: 23

Youth career
- 2003: AS Coteaux Mulhouse
- 2004–2008: Mulhouse
- 2008–2013: Sochaux

Senior career*
Years	Team	Apps	(Gls)
2013–2017	Sochaux	91	(1)
2017–2024	Sporting Charleroi	215	(15)
2025	Kortrijk	13	(1)
2025–	Standard Liège	31	(3)

International career^{‡}
2013	France U19	5	(0)
2014–2015	France U20	6	(0)
2017–	Madagascar	31	(3)
- * Club domestic league appearances and goals as of 31 May 2026 ‡ National team caps and goals as of 8 July 2025

Marco Ilaimaharitra (born 26 July 1995) is a professional footballer who plays as a defensive midfielder for Belgian Pro League club Standard Liège. Born in France, he is a former member of its under-19 and under-20 national teams but represents Madagascar at senior international level.

== Club career ==
Born in Mulhouse, Ilaimaharitra started his career with his hometown club, AS Coteaux Mulhouse. Later, he joined FC Mulhouse. In 2008, he joined the youth team of FC Sochaux-Montbéliard. His professional debut came on 14 December 2013, in a 1–0 away defeat against OGC Nice. Four days later, he featured in the Coupe de la Ligue against OGC Nice.

On 15 January 2025, Ilaimaharitra signed a contract with Kortrijk until the end of the 2024–25 season, with an option to extend for 2025–26. However, he instead joined Standard Liège.

== International career ==
Ilaimaharitra was born in France, and is of Malagasy and Réunionnais descent. Previously a youth international for France, he made his debut for Madagascar in a friendly match against Comoros on 11 November 2017.

On 27 June 2019, Ilaimaharitra scored a late 76th minute free-kick against Burundi to secure a 1–0 win and historic first ever win for Madagascar in the 2019 Africa Cup of Nations.

== Career statistics ==
=== Club ===
As of match played 19 July 2019

Appearances and goals by club, season and competition
Club	Season	League			National Cup		League Cup		Other		Total	
Club	Season	Division	Apps	Goals	Apps	Goals	Apps	Goals	Apps	Goals	Apps	Goals
Sochaux II	2012–13	CFA	4	0	–		–		–		4	0
Sochaux II	2013–14	CFA	7	0	–		–		–		7	0
Sochaux II	2014–15	CFA	3	0	–		–		–		3	0
Sochaux II	2015–16	CFA	2	0	–		–		–		2	0
Sochaux II	2016–17	CFA2	4	0	–		–		–		4	0
Sochaux II	Total		20	0	0	0	0	0	0	0	20	0
Sochaux	2013–14	Ligue 1	12	0	2	0	1	0	–		15	0
Sochaux	2014–15	Ligue 2	27	1	0	0	1	0	–		28	1
Sochaux	2015–16	Ligue 2	29	0	5	0	2	0	–		36	0
Sochaux	2016–17	Ligue 2	23	0	0	0	4	0	–		27	0
Sochaux	Total		91	1	7	0	8	0	0	0	106	1
Charleroi	2017–18	Belgian First Division A	23	1	3	0	–		10	1	36	2
Charleroi	2018–19	Belgian First Division A	25	1	2	0	–		9	0	36	1
Charleroi	Total		48	2	5	0	0	0	19	1	72	3
Career total			159	3	12	0	8	0	19	1	198	4

=== International ===
As of matches played on 24 March 2025

Appearances and goals by national team and year
National team	Year	Apps	Goals
Madagascar national team	2017	1	0
Madagascar national team	2018	4	0
Madagascar national team	2019	8	1
Madagascar national team	2020	3	1
Madagascar national team	2021	4	0
Madagascar national team	2022	2	1
Madagascar national team	2023	3	0
Madagascar national team	2024	4	0
Madagascar national team	2025	2	0
Total		31	3

=== International goals ===
Scores and results list Madagascar's goal tally first, score column indicates score after each Ilaimaharitra goal.

List of international goals scored by Marco Ilaimaharitra
No.	Date	Venue	Opponent	Score	Result	Competition
1.	27 June 2019	Alexandria Stadium, Alexandria, Egypt	Burundi	1–0	1–0	2019 Africa Cup of Nations
2.	12 October 2020	Stade El Abdi, El Jadida, Morocco	Burkina Faso	1–1	2–1	Friendly
3.	24 September 2022	Stade El Bachir, Mohammedia, Morocco	Congo	3–3	3–3	Friendly

== Honours ==
=== Individual ===
National Team

- Man of the Match Burundi group B (1) : Africa Cup Of Nation 2019
- Knight Order of Madagascar: 2019
