= Dorian Dessoleil =

Belgian footballer

Personal information
- Date of birth: 7 August 1992 (age 34)
- Place of birth: Charleroi, Belgium
- Height: 1.88 m (6 ft 2 in)
- Position: Centre-back

Team information
- Current team: Francs Borains
- Number: 24

Senior career*
Years	Team	Apps	(Gls)
2010–2013	Sporting Charleroi	5	(0)
2013–2014	Sint-Truidense	21	(0)
2014–2015	Royal Excelsior Virton	34	(6)
2015–2021	Sporting Charleroi	183	(12)
2021–2024	Antwerp	22	(0)
2022–2023	→ Kortrijk (loan)	13	(0)
2023–2024	Young Reds	5	(0)
2024–	Francs Borains	57	(3)
- * Club domestic league appearances and goals as of 20 April 2026

Dorian Dessoleil (born 7 August 1992) is a Belgian professional footballer who plays for Francs Borains.

== Club career ==
On 27 August 2021, he joined Antwerp on a three-year contract.

On 27 July 2022, Dessoleil moved on a one-season loan to Kortrijk. After returning to Royal Antwerp from his loan spell, Dessoleil was - for unknown reasons - relegated to the club's B team, the Young Reds.

== Career statistics ==
=== Club ===
As of match played 5 August 2017

Club	Season	League			Belgian Cup		Europe		Other		Total	
Club	Season	Division	Apps	Goals	Apps	Goals	Apps	Goals	Apps	Goals	Apps	Goals
Charleroi	2012–13	Pro League	5	0	0	0	~	~	0	0	5	0
Excelsior Virton	2013–14	Second Division	21	0	0	0	~	~	1 (Note: Appearance in the Second Division promotion play-offs)	0	22	0
Sint-Truidense	2014–15	Second Division	34	6	0	0	~	~	0	0	34	6
Charleroi	2015–16	Pro League	24	3	2	0	0	0	0	0	26	3
Charleroi	2016–17	First Division A	19	1	2	0	~	~	0	0	21	1
Charleroi	2017–18	First Division A	2	1	0	0	~	~	0	0	2	1
Charleroi	Standard Charleroi		45	5	4	0	0	0	0	0	49	5
Career total			105	11	4	0	0	0	1	0	106	11
