= 2017–18 Belgian First Division A =

115th season of top-tier football in Belgium

Belgian First Division A
- Season: 2017–18
- Dates: 28 July 2017 – 20 May 2018
- Champions: Club Brugge
- Relegated: Mechelen
- Champions League: Club Brugge; Standard Liège
- Europa League: Anderlecht; Gent; Genk
- Matches: 240
- Goals: 687 (2.86 per match)
- Top goalscorer: Hamdi Harbaoui (22 goals)
- Biggest home win: Club Brugge 5–0 Anderlecht (17 December 2017)
- Biggest away win: Eupen 0–5 Zulte Waregem (29 July 2017)
- Highest scoring: Antwerp 3–5 Genk (13 August 2017); Sint-Truiden 4–4 Eupen (4 November 2017); Anderlecht 5–3 Excel Mouscron (25 February 2018)
- Longest winning run: 5 matches Club Brugge; Charleroi
- Longest unbeaten run: 11 matches Club Brugge
- Longest winless run: 10 matches Excel Mouscron
- Longest losing run: 6 matches Mechelen
- Highest attendance: Regular season 27,531; Club Brugge 2–2 Genk (17 February 2018); Play-offs; 27,531; Club Brugge 1–0 Genk (2 April 2018)
- Lowest attendance: Regular season 2,100; Eupen 0–0 Sint-Truiden (16 December 2017); Play-offs; 1,498; Lierse 0–3 Excel Mouscron (31 March 2018)
- Average attendance: Regular season 10,867; Play-offs; 8,789
- All statistics correct as of 11 March 2018.

The 2017–18 Belgian First Division A was the 115th season of top-tier football in Belgium. The season began on 28 July 2017 and concluded on 20 May 2018. The fixtures were announced in early June 2017. Anderlecht were the defending champions but had to settle for third place with Club Brugge taking their 15th title.

== Team changes ==
- Westerlo was relegated after finishing last in the 2016–17 Belgian First Division A.
- Antwerp was promoted after winning the promotion play-offs against Roeselare.

== Teams ==
=== Stadiums and locations ===
Locations of the 2017–18 Belgian First Division A teams

Matricule	Club	Location	Venue	Capacity
35	Anderlecht	Anderlecht	Constant Vanden Stock Stadium	21,500
1	Antwerp	Antwerp	Bosuilstadion	12,975
22	Charleroi	Charleroi	Stade du Pays de Charleroi	14,000
3	Club Brugge	Bruges	Jan Breydel Stadium	29,042
4276	Eupen	Eupen	Kehrweg Stadion	8,363
322	Genk	Genk	Luminus Arena	24,956
7	Gent	Ghent	Ghelamco Arena	20,000
19	Kortrijk	Kortrijk	Guldensporen Stadion	9,399
282	Lokeren	Lokeren	Daknamstadion	12,000
25	Mechelen	Mechelen	AFAS-stadion Achter de Kazerne	16,700
216	Excel Mouscron	Mouscron	Stade Le Canonnier	10,571
31	Oostende	Ostend	Versluys Arena	8,432
373	Sint-Truiden	Sint-Truiden	Stayen	14,600
16	Standard Liège	Liège	Stade Maurice Dufrasne	30,023
4068	Waasland-Beveren	Beveren	Freethiel Stadion	8,190
5381	Zulte Waregem	Waregem	Regenboogstadion	12,500

=== Personnel and kits ===
Club	Manager	Captain	Kit manufacturer	Sponsors
Anderlecht	(Belgium) Hein Vanhaezebrouck	(Belgium) Leander Dendoncker	Adidas	BNP Paribas Fortis
Antwerp	(Romania) László Bölöni	(Belgium) Faris Haroun	Jako	Star Casino
Charleroi	(Belgium) Felice Mazzu	(Spain) Francisco Martos	Hungaria	Proximus
Club Brugge	(Croatia) Ivan Leko	(Netherlands) Ruud Vormer	Macron	Daikin
Eupen	(France) Claude Makélélé	(Spain) Luis García	Nike	Aspire Academy
Excel Mouscron	(Belgium) Frank Defays	(France) Dimitri Mohamed	Erima	Star Casino
Genk	(Belgium) Philippe Clement	(Belgium) Thomas Buffel	Nike	Beobank
Gent	(Belgium) Yves Vanderhaeghe	(Ghana) Nana Akwasi Asare	Jartazi	VDK Spaarbank
Kortrijk	(Belgium) Glen De Boeck	(Belgium) Hannes Van der Bruggen	Jako	AGO Jobs & HR
Lokeren	(Belgium) Peter Maes	(Belgium) Killian Overmeire	Jartazi	QTeam
Mechelen	(Netherlands) Dennis van Wijk	(Belgium) Seth De Witte	Jartazi	Telenet
Oostende	(Bosnia and Herzegovina) Adnan Čustović	(Belgium) Nicolas Lombaerts	Joma	Willems Veranda's
Sint-Truiden	(Belgium) Jonas De Roeck	(Belgium) Steven De Petter	Kappa	Golden Palace
Standard Liège	(Portugal) Ricardo Sá Pinto	(Belgium) Sébastien Pocognoli	New Balance	BASE
Waasland-Beveren	(Belgium) Dirk Geeraerd	(France) Rudy Camacho	Kappa	Circus
Zulte-Waregem	(Belgium) Francky Dury	(Belgium) Davy De fauw	Patrick	Record Bank

=== Managerial changes ===
Team	Outgoing manager	Manner of departure	Date of vacancy	Position	Replaced by	Date of appointment
Waasland-Beveren	(North Macedonia) Čedomir Janevski	Mutual consent	End of 2016–17 season	Pre-season	(Belgium) Philippe Clement	24 May 2017
Club Brugge	(Belgium) Michel Preud'homme	Mutual consent	End of 2016–17 season	Pre-season	(Croatia) Ivan Leko	8 June 2017
Kortrijk	(France) Karim Belhocine	Replaced	End of 2016–17 season	Pre-season	(Greece) Yannis Anastasiou	20 May 2017 (Note: Anastasiou was announced as manager on 24 April 2017 but only replaced Karim Belhocine after the final match of the season.)
Standard Liège	(Belgium) José Jeunechamps (caretaker)	Caretaker replaced	End of 2016–17 season	Pre-season	(Portugal) Ricardo Sá Pinto	11 June 2017
Sint-Truiden	(Croatia) Ivan Leko	Signed by Club Brugge	8 June 2017	Pre-season	(Spain) Tintín Márquez	22 June 2017
Antwerp	(Belgium) Wim De Decker	Demoted to assistant coach	16 June 2017	Pre-season	(Romania) László Bölöni	16 June 2017
Sint-Truiden	(Spain) Tintín Márquez	Sacked	7 August 2017	8th	(Belgium) Jonas De Roeck	10 August 2017
Lokeren	(Iceland) Rúnar Kristinsson	Sacked	9 August 2017	15th	(Belgium) Peter Maes	9 August 2017
Anderlecht	(Switzerland) René Weiler	Sacked	18 September 2017	9th	(Argentina) Nicolás Frutos (caretaker)	18 September 2017
Oostende	(Belgium) Yves Vanderhaeghe	Sacked	19 September 2017	16th	(Bosnia and Herzegovina) Adnan Čustović	19 September 2017
Gent	(Belgium) Hein Vanhaezebrouck	Mutual consent	27 September 2017	14th	(Belgium) Yves Vanderhaeghe	4 October 2017
Anderlecht	(Argentina) Nicolás Frutos	Caretaker replaced	3 October 2017	7th	(Belgium) Hein Vanhaezebrouck	3 October 2017
Mechelen	(Belgium) Yannick Ferrera	Sacked	23 October 2017	15th	(Belgium) Tom Caluwé (caretaker)	23 October 2017
Mechelen	(Belgium) Tom Caluwé (caretaker)	Caretaker replaced	1 November 2017	16th	(Serbia) Aleksandar Janković	1 November 2017
Eupen	(Spain) Jordi Condom	Sacked	6 November 2017	16th	(France) Claude Makélélé	6 November 2017
Kortrijk	(Greece) Yannis Anastasiou	Sacked	8 November 2017	15th	(Belgium) Glen De Boeck	8 November 2017
Genk	(Netherlands) Albert Stuivenberg	Sacked	10 December 2017	9th	(Belgium) Philippe Clement	19 December 2017
Waasland-Beveren	(Belgium) Philippe Clement	Signed for Genk	19 December 2017	7th	(Belgium) Sven Vermant	5 January 2018
Mechelen	(Serbia) Aleksandar Janković	Sacked	24 January 2018	15th	(Netherlands) Dennis van Wijk	24 January 2018
Excel Mouscron	(Romania) Mircea Rednic	Sacked	14 February 2018	12th	(Belgium) Frank Defays	14 February 2018
Waasland-Beveren	(Belgium) Sven Vermant	Sacked	9 May 2018	Regular season: 12th Europa League POs: 6th	(Belgium) Dirk Geeraerd (caretaker)	9 May 2018

== Regular season ==
=== League table ===
Pos	Team	Pld	W	D	L	GF	GA	GD	Pts	Qualification or relegation
1	Club Brugge	30	20	7	3	68	33	+35	67	Qualification for the championship play-offs
2	Anderlecht	30	16	7	7	49	42	+7	55	Qualification for the championship play-offs
3	Charleroi	30	13	12	5	46	30	+16	51	Qualification for the championship play-offs
4	Gent	30	14	8	8	45	27	+18	50	Qualification for the championship play-offs
5	Genk	30	11	11	8	44	36	+8	44	Qualification for the championship play-offs
6	Standard Liège	30	11	11	8	43	41	+2	44	Qualification for the championship play-offs
7	Kortrijk	30	12	6	12	42	39	+3	42	Qualification for the Europa League play-offs
8	Antwerp	30	10	11	9	38	40	−2	41	Qualification for the Europa League play-offs
9	Zulte Waregem	30	11	4	15	47	52	−5	37	Qualification for the Europa League play-offs
10	Sint-Truiden	30	9	10	11	29	41	−12	37	Qualification for the Europa League play-offs
11	Oostende	30	10	6	14	42	41	+1	36	Qualification for the Europa League play-offs
12	Waasland-Beveren	30	9	8	13	50	51	−1	35	Qualification for the Europa League play-offs
13	Lokeren	30	8	7	15	33	49	−16	31	Qualification for the Europa League play-offs
14	Excel Mouscron	30	8	6	16	40	59	−19	30	Qualification for the Europa League play-offs
15	Eupen	30	6	9	15	40	57	−17	27	Qualification for the Europa League play-offs
16	Mechelen (R)	30	6	9	15	31	49	−18	27	Relegation to First Division B

Source: Belgian First Division A (in Dutch), Soccerway
Rules for classification: 1) Points; 2) Matches won; 3) Goal difference; 4) Goals scored; 5) Away goals scored; 6) Away matches won; 7) Play-off.
(R) Relegated

=== Results ===
Home \ Away	AND	ANT	BRU	CHA	EUP	EXM	GNK	GNT	KVK	LOK	KVM	OOS	STA	STR	W-B	ZWA
Anderlecht	—	2–1	0–0	1–3	1–0	5–3	0–1	1–0	4–0	3–2	2–2	1–0	1–0	2–3	2–2	2–0
Antwerp	0–0	—	2–2	1–3	2–0	1–0	3–5	1–1	3–0	1–2	0–0	0–0	0–0	1–1	1–2	3–0
Club Brugge	5–0	1–0	—	3–3	3–1	4–2	2–2	2–1	2–1	3–1	2–0	3–2	4–0	4–1	3–0	3–2
Charleroi	2–0	1–1	1–2	—	2–2	2–0	1–1	2–1	1–0	1–1	2–0	1–1	1–1	0–0	2–2	3–2
Eupen	2–3	0–1	2–2	1–0	—	4–0	3–3	1–1	1–2	3–2	4–1	2–1	1–1	0–0	1–0	0–5
Excel Mouscron	1–2	2–2	2–1	2–5	3–2	—	0–1	3–2	0–3	1–2	2–2	1–0	1–3	1–1	2–2	2–1
Genk	0–1	4–0	2–0	0–1	1–1	1–1	—	1–2	2–3	0–0	1–0	1–1	0–2	1–1	3–3	3–1
Gent	0–0	0–1	2–0	1–0	3–0	3–1	1–1	—	2–1	3–0	2–2	2–3	1–0	3–0	2–0	0–1
Kortrijk	2–2	4–0	1–2	2–0	0–0	1–1	0–0	1–1	—	1–0	2–0	1–2	2–1	3–2	4–1	0–1
Lokeren	1–2	1–1	0–4	1–1	3–0	0–2	1–2	0–3	0–1	—	2–0	0–3	0–3	1–1	1–1	0–2
Mechelen	3–4	1–2	0–3	1–1	1–0	0–2	3–1	1–1	2–0	0–2	—	1–1	1–1	2–0	2–0	0–2
Oostende	2–0	3–4	2–3	3–0	1–0	0–1	1–2 (Note: The match between Oostende and Genk of 27 December was cancelled as a heavy storm caused parts of the roof to come down shortly before the start of the match. As safety to supporters and players could not be guaranteed, the match was postponed until 16 January.)	0–2	2–1	2–3	0–1	—	2–3	2–0	0–3	4–2
Standard Liège	3–3	1–1	1–1	0–0	3–2	4–3	2–1	0–0	3–1	2–1	3–2	0–0	—	1–1	3–1	0–4
Sint-Truiden	1–0	0–3	0–1	0–1	4–4	1–0	2–1	3–2	0–2	0–0	2–0	1–0	1–0	—	1–0	1–1
Waasland-Beveren	1–2	3–0	1–1	0–2	5–1	2–0	0–1	1–2	2–1	2–3	2–2	1–3	3–1	3–1	—	2–2
Zulte Waregem	2–3	1–2	1–2	0–4	3–2	2–1	0–1	0–1	2–2	1–3	2–1	1–1	2–1	2–0	2–5	—

Source: Belgian Pro League (in Dutch)
Legend: Blue = home team win; Yellow = draw; Red = away team win.

== Championship play-offs ==
The points obtained during the regular season were halved (and rounded up) before the start of the playoff. As a result, the teams started with the following points before the playoff: Club Brugge 34 points, Anderlecht 28, Charleroi 26, Gent 25, Genk 22 and Standard Liège 22. The points of Club Brugge, Anderlecht and Charleroi were rounded up, therefore in case of any ties on points at the end of the playoffs, the half point would be deducted for these teams.

=== League table ===
Pos	Team	Pld	W	D	L	GF	GA	GD	Pts	Qualification	CLU	STA	AND	GNT	GNK	CHA
1	Club Brugge (C)	10	3	3	4	17	12	+5	46	Qualification for the Champions League group stage	—	4–4	1–2	0–1	1–0	6–0
2	Standard Liège	10	6	3	1	20	9	+11	43	Qualification for the Champions League third qualifying round	1–1	—	2–1	1–0	5–0	1–0
3	Anderlecht	10	4	0	6	12	15	−3	40	Qualification for the Europa League group stage	1–0	1–3	—	0–2	1–2	3–1
4	Gent	10	4	2	4	8	8	0	39	Qualification for the Europa League third qualifying round	1–0	1–3	1–0	—	0–0	0–1
5	Genk (O)	10	4	4	2	13	13	0	38	Qualification for the Europa League play-off final	1–1	1–0	2–1	1–1	—	4–1
6	Charleroi	10	2	2	6	9	22	−13	34		1–3	0–0	1–2	2–1	2–2	—

Source: Soccerway
Rules for classification: 1) Points; 2) Points without (possible) half points added due to rounding; 3) Position obtained during the Regular season
(C) Champions; (O) Play-off winners

== Europa League play-offs ==
Group A of the play-offs consisted of the teams finishing in positions 7, 9, 12 and 14 during the regular season, and the first and third placed team in the qualifying positions in the 2017–18 Belgian First Division B. The teams finishing in positions 8, 10, 11, 13 and 15 joined the second placed qualifier from the 2017–18 Belgian First Division B in group B.

=== Group A ===
Pos	Team	Pld	W	D	L	GF	GA	GD	Pts	Qualification	ZWA	KVK	EXM	OHL	W-B	LIE
1	Zulte Waregem	10	9	1	0	35	8	+27	28	Qualification for the Europa League play-off semi-final	—	3–0	5–1	2–2	8–0	5–0 FF (Note: Following the bankruptcy of Lierse, the team folded and forfeited its two remaining matches of the season.)
2	Kortrijk	10	6	1	3	18	12	+6	19		1–2	—	1–1	2–1	4–1	2–1
3	Excel Mouscron	10	4	2	4	18	16	+2	14		1–2	2–1	—	5–0	1–1	1–0
4	OH Leuven	10	2	3	5	12	18	−6	9		1–2	0–2	3–1	—	0–0	1–2
5	Waasland-Beveren	10	2	2	6	12	23	−11	8		1–2	1–3	3–2	0–2	—	0–1
6	Lierse	10	2	1	7	7	25	−18	7		1–4	0–2	0–3	2–2	0–5 FF	—

Rules for classification: 1) Points; 2) Matches won; 3) Goal difference; 4) Goals scored; 5) Away goals scored; 6) Away matches won; 7) Play-off.

=== Group B ===
Pos	Team	Pld	W	D	L	GF	GA	GD	Pts	Qualification	LOK	STR	ANT	OOS	EUP	B-W
1	Lokeren	10	6	3	1	21	11	+10	21	Qualification for the Europa League play-off semi-final	—	1–0	1–2	2–2	3–0	4–2
2	Sint-Truiden	10	5	2	3	22	15	+7	17		1–1	—	4–0	4–1	2–3	3–2
3	Antwerp	10	4	2	4	13	16	−3	14		1–2	1–2	—	3–3	2–1	2–0
4	Oostende	10	3	5	2	21	18	+3	14		1–3	2–2	3–1	—	1–1	2–2
5	Eupen	10	2	2	6	11	21	−10	8		0–2	3–1	0–1	0–4	—	2–2
6	Beerschot Wilrijk	10	1	4	5	14	21	−7	7		2–2	1–3	0–0	0–2	3–1	—

Rules for classification: 1) Points; 2) Matches won; 3) Goal difference; 4) Goals scored; 5) Away goals scored; 6) Away matches won; 7) Play-off.

=== Semi-final ===
The winners of both play-off groups competed in one match to play the fourth-placed or fifth-placed team of the championship play-offs for a spot in the final. Zulte Waregem received home advantage as they finished higher in the regular season. Despite going down twice with 10 men, Zulte Waregem won, which meant they advanced to the final to play for a spot in the second qualifying round of the 2018–19 UEFA Europa League.

23 May 2018
20:30 CEST

Zulte Waregem	2–2 (a.e.t.)	Lokeren
De fauw 90+3'; Šaponjić 114'	Sporza	Cevallos 89'; Mareček 96'
Penalties
Derijck (penalty scored); De fauw (penalty missed); Hämäläinen (penalty scored); Šaponjić (penalty scored); Harbaoui (penalty scored)	4–3	(penalty missed) Skúlason; (penalty scored) Rassoul; (penalty missed) Mareček; (penalty scored) Söder; (penalty scored) Cevallos

Regenboogstadion, Waregem
Referee: Sébastien Delferière

=== Final ===
The winners of the Europa League play-off semi-final and the fifth-placed team of the championship play-offs played one match to determine the Europa League play-off winners. The winners qualified for the second qualifying round of the 2018–19 UEFA Europa League.

27 May 2018
18:00 CEST

Genk	2–0	Zulte-Waregem
Samatta 17'; Trossard 28'	Report

Luminus Arena, Genk
Referee: Bart Vertenten

== Number of teams by provinces ==
Number of teams	Province or region	Team(s)
4	West Flanders	Club Brugge, Kortrijk, Oostende and Zulte Waregem
3	East Flanders	Gent, Lokeren and Waasland-Beveren
2	Antwerp	Antwerp and Mechelen
2	Hainaut	Charleroi and Excel Mouscron
2	Liège	Eupen and Standard Liège
2	Limburg	Genk and Sint-Truiden
1	Brussels	Anderlecht

== Season statistics ==
=== Top scorers ===
As of matches played on 23 May 2018.

Rank	Player	Club	Goals
1	(Tunisia) Hamdi Harbaoui	Zulte Waregem	22
2	(France) Teddy Chevalier	KV Kortrijk	21
3	(Sweden) Isaac Kiese Thelin	Waasland-Beveren	19
4	(Iran) Kaveh Rezaei	Sporting Charleroi	16
5	(Poland) Lukasz Teodorczyk	RSC Anderlecht	15
5	(Mali) Abdoulay Diaby	Club Brugge	15

=== Hat-tricks ===
Rnd	Player	Club	Goals	Date	Home	Score	Away
11	(Sweden) Isaac Kiese Thelin	Waasland-Beveren	7' 20' 46' 87'	22 October 2017	Zulte Waregem	2 – 5	Waasland-Beveren
12	(Belgium) Brecht Capon	KV Oostende	23' 49' 71'	24 October 2017	KV Oostende	3 – 0	Sporting Charleroi
24	(Algeria) Sofiane Hanni	RSC Anderlecht	14' 41' 44'	28 January 2018	Standard Liège	3 – 3	RSC Anderlecht
26	(France) Teddy Chevalier	KV Kortrijk	38' 69' 83'	10 February 2018	KV Kortrijk	4 – 0	Royal Antwerp
28	(Poland) Łukasz Teodorczyk	RSC Anderlecht	45+2' (pen.) 57' 61'	25 February 2018	RSC Anderlecht	5 – 3	Excel Mouscron
30	(Japan) Yuta Toyokawa	KAS Eupen	73' 80' 89'	11 March 2018	KAS Eupen	4 – 0	Excel Mouscron
33	(Tunisia) Hamdi Harbaoui	S.V. Zulte Waregem	23' 61' 78' 85'	14 April 2018	S.V. Zulte Waregem	5 – 1	Excel Mouscron
34	(Tunisia) Hamdi Harbaoui	S.V. Zulte Waregem	53' (pen.) 54' 76'	17 April 2018	Lierse S.K.	1 – 4	S.V. Zulte Waregem

Updated to match(es) played on 14 April 2018.

=== Top assists ===
As of matches played on 30 April 2018.

Rank	Player	Club	Assists
1	(Netherlands) Ruud Vormer	Club Brugge KV	16
2	(Japan) Ryota Morioka	Waasland-Beveren/RSC Anderlecht	13
3	(Belgium) Hans Vanaken	Club Brugge KV	11
4	(Algeria) Idir Ouali	KV Kortrijk	8
4	(Romania) Răzvan Marin	Standard Liège	8

=== Clean sheets ===
As of matches played on 30 April 2018.

Rank	Player	Club	Clean sheets
1	(Turkey) Sinan Bolat	Royal Antwerp FC	14
2	(Croatia) Lovre Kalinić	KAA Gent	13
3	(Australia) Danny Vukovic	KRC Genk	10
4	(Belgium) Matz Sels	RSC Anderlecht	9
4	(France) Nicolas Penneteau	Sporting Charleroi	9

== Awards ==
=== Annual awards ===
Award	Winner	Club
Belgian Professional Footballer of the Year	(Belgium) Hans Vanaken	Club Brugge
Belgian Professional Football Manager of the Year	(Croatia) Ivan Leko	Club Brugge
Belgian Professional Football Young Player of the Year	(Brazil) Wesley Moraes	Club Brugge

=== Team of the Season ===
Team of the Season
Goalkeeper	(Turkey) Sinan Bolat (Antwerp)			
Defence	(Belgium) Luis Pedro Cavanda (Standard Liège)	(Angola) Christian Luyindama (Standard Liège)	(Belgium) Brandon Mechele (Club Brugge)	(Finland) Jere Uronen (Genk)
Midfield	(Netherlands) Ruud Vormer (Club Brugge)		(Zambia) Marvelous Nakamba (Club Brugge)	
Attack	(Belgium) Stallone Limbombe (Antwerp)		(Belgium) Geoffry Hairemans (Antwerp)	(Belgium) Leandro Trossard (Genk)
Striker	(Tunisia) Hamdi Harbaoui (Zulte Waregem)			

== Attendances ==
No.	Club	Average attendance	Change	Highest
1	Club Brugge	26,183	-2,4%	28,500
2	Standard de Liège	21,985	19,5%	27,602
3	Anderlecht	19,275	2,2%	21,000
4	Gent	18,571	-6,3%	20,000
5	Genk	15,623	2,2%	19,755
6	Mechelen	12,998	12,9%	16,713
7	Royal Antwerp	12,214	5,7%	16,649
8	Charleroi	10,502	7,7%	14,330
9	Zulte Waregem	8,809	-8,8%	12,300
10	Kortrijk	6,922	31,0%	9,340
11	STVV	6,396	0,5%	14,600
12	Oostende	5,773	-20,9%	8,432
13	Lokeren	5,749	-6,3%	12,000
14	Mouscron	5,497	92,8%	10,571
15	Waasland-Beveren	4,592	17,4%	8,235
16	Eupen	3,315	13,6%	8,300
