= Karim Belhocine =

French footballer and coach (born 1978)

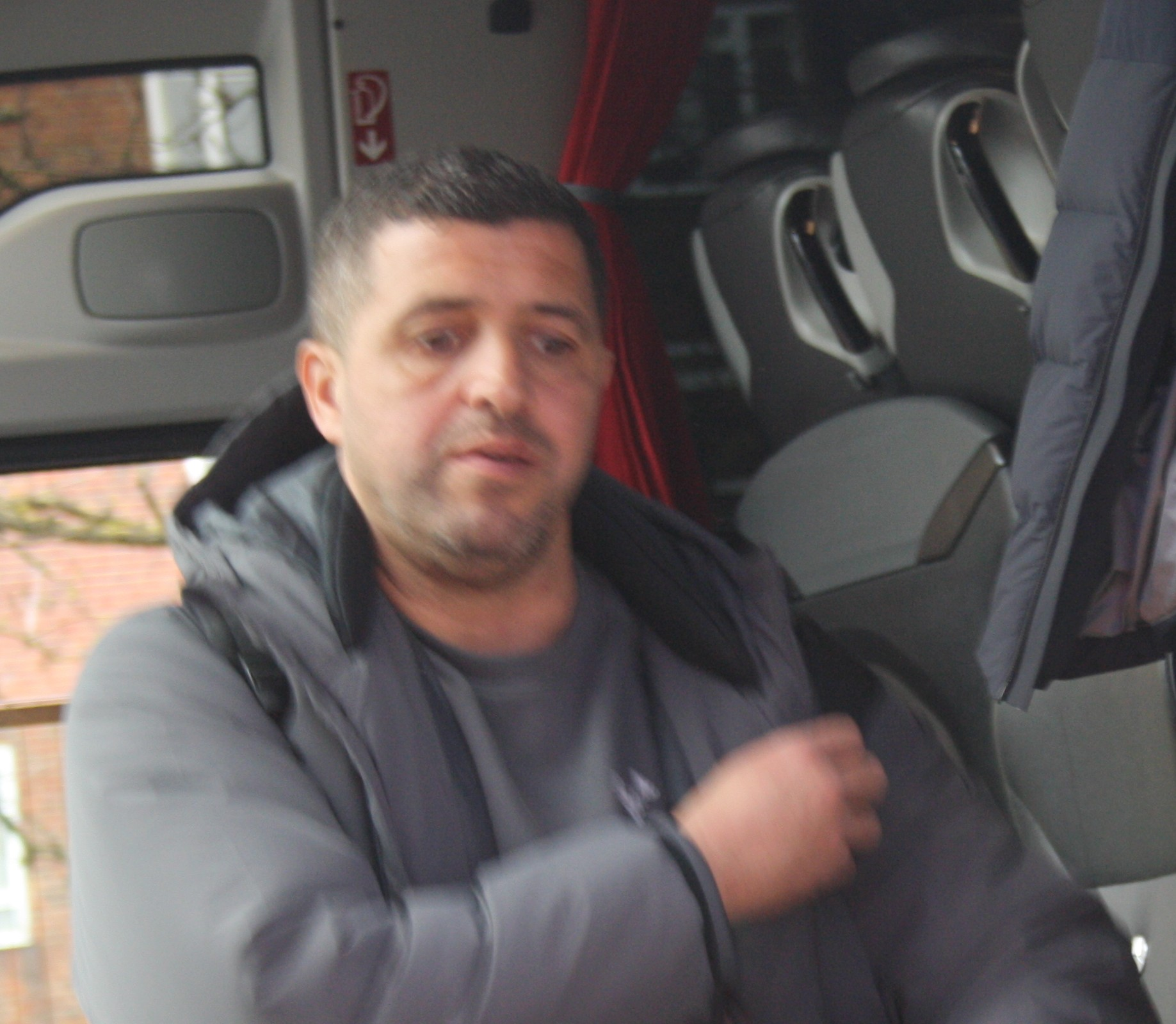
- Belhocine in April 2026

Personal information
- Date of birth: 2 April 1978 (age 48)
- Place of birth: Vénissieux, France
- Height: 1.87 m (6 ft 2 in)
- Position: Centre-back

Team information
- Current team: JS Kabylie (head coach)

Youth career
- 1995–1998: Saint-Priest
- 1998–2001: FC Vaulx-en-Velin

Senior career*
Years	Team	Apps	(Gls)
2001–2002	Espinho	4	(0)
2002–2003	Forbach	20	(5)
2003–2005	Trélissac	60	(2)
2005–2008	Virton	93	(12)
2008–2011	Kortrijk	92	(4)
2011–2012	Standard Liège	14	(0)
2012–2014	Waasland-Beveren	51	(1)
2014–2015	Gent	7	(0)
Total		341	(24)

Managerial career
- 2016–2017: Kortrijk
- 2019: Anderlecht (caretaker)
- 2019–2021: Charleroi
- 2021–2022: Kortrijk
- 2024–2025: Francs Borains
- 2026: Watford (assistant)
- 2026–: JS Kabylie
- * Club domestic league appearances and goals

Karim Belhocine (Tamazight: ⴽⴰⵔⵉⵎ ⴱⴻⵍⵀⵓⵙⵉⵏ; born 2 April 1978) is a French football coach and former professional player who played as a centre-back. He is the current head coach of JS Kabylie.

== Early life ==
Belhocine was born in Vénissieux, France, to Algerian parents from Kabylia. His father is from Lakhdaria (Bouira), while his mother is from Akbou (Béjaïa).

== Playing career ==
Belhocine previously played for the Belgian side RE Virton, the Portuguese club S.C. Espinho, as well as the French amateur clubs US Forbach and Trélissac . On 8 May 2008, he joined K.V. Kortrijk, which gained promotion to the Belgian First Division, on a free transfer from Virton.

On 19 July 2011, Belhocine signed a two-year contract with Belgian Pro League side Standard Liège.

== Coaching career ==
On 12 October 2021, he returned to Kortrijk as a manager.

On 12 November 2024, Belhocine was hired to manage Francs Borains in Challenger Pro League.

Belhocine later worked as a first-team coach under manager Edward Still at Watford, a role he held for less than three months until early May 2026.

On 4 July 2026, Belhocine was appointed as head coach of JS Kabylie, until June 2028.

== Managerial statistics ==
As of matches played 19 November 2026

Managerial record by team and tenure
Team	From	To	Record								Ref
Team	From	To	G	W	D	L	GF	GA	GD	Win %	Ref
Kortijk	9 February 2016	30 June 2017	43	13	10	20	56	81	−25	30.23	
Anderlecht (caretaker)	16 April 2019	30 June 2019	6	1	3	2	5	6	−1	16.67	
Charleroi	1 July 2019	30 June 2021	70	30	18	22	104	82	+22	42.86	
Kortrijk	12 October 2021	28 August 2022	35	9	7	19	36	54	−18	25.71	
Francs Borains	12 November 2024	30 June 2025	18	6	4	8	22	28	−6	33.33	
JS Kabylie	4 July 2026	Present	9	6	2	1	13	3	+10	66.67	
Career totals			181	65	44	72	239	254	−15	35.91	

== Honours ==
Gent

- Belgian Pro League: 2014–15
