= Gaëtan Hendrickx =

Belgian footballer

Personal information
- Date of birth: 30 March 1995 (age 31)
- Place of birth: Braine-l'Alleud, Belgium
- Height: 1.75 m (5 ft 9 in)
- Position: Midfielder

Team information
- Current team: Eupen
- Number: 22

Senior career*
Years	Team	Apps	(Gls)
2014–2016	Sint-Truiden	42	(4)
2016–2021	Sporting Charleroi	92	(4)
2021	→ Kortrijk (loan)	6	(0)
2021–2024	Deinze	95	(13)
2025–	Eupen	4	(0)

International career
	Belgium U16	9	(0)
	Belgium U17	2	(0)
	Belgium U18	6	(0)
	Belgium U19	6	(0)
- * Club domestic league appearances and goals as of 5 May 2025

Gaëtan Hendrickx (born 30 March 1995) is a Belgian professional footballer who plays as a midfielder for Eupen.

He is the younger brother of fellow professional footballer Jonathan Hendrickx.

== Club career ==
On 14 August 2021, he signed a contract with Deinze for the term of two years with an option for the third.
