= Steeven Willems =

French footballer (born 1990)

Personal information
- Date of birth: 31 August 1990 (age 36)
- Place of birth: Seclin, France
- Height: 1.80 m (5 ft 11 in)
- Position: Centre back

Senior career*
| Years | Team | Apps | (Gls) |
| 2011–2013 | Lille B | 43 | (0) |
| 2013–2022 | Charleroi | 119 | (2) |
- * Club domestic league appearances and goals as of 25 February 2022

Steeven Willems (born 31 August 1990) is a French footballer who plays as a centre back.
