= Ryota Morioka =

Japanese footballer

Personal information
- Date of birth: 12 April 1991 (age 35)
- Place of birth: Jōyō, Kyoto, Japan
- Height: 1.80 m (5 ft 11 in)
- Position: Midfielder

Youth career
- 1998–2000: Seido Canga FC
- 2000–2003: FC Solceu
- 2004–2006: Higashi Joyo Junior High School
- 2007–2009: Kumiyama High School

Senior career*
Years	Team	Apps	(Gls)
2010–2015	Vissel Kobe	131	(17)
2016–2017	Śląsk Wrocław	51	(15)
2017–2018	Waasland-Beveren	24	(7)
2018–2019	Anderlecht	22	(6)
2019	→ Charleroi (loan)	15	(4)
2019–2024	Charleroi	138	(15)
2024–2025	Vissel Kobe	0	(0)
Total		381	(64)

International career
2014–2018	Japan	5	(0)
- * Club domestic league appearances and goals

Ryota Morioka (森岡 亮太, Morioka Ryōta; born 12 April 1991) is a Japanese former professional footballer who played as a midfielder.

== Career ==
After six seasons with Vissel Kobe, Morioka moved to Śląsk Wrocław in January 2016.

On 6 July 2017, he became Belgian club Waasland-Beveren's record signing.

In late January 2018, Morioka was transferred to fellow Belgian First Division A side RSC Anderlecht for €2.5 million.

A year later, he was loaned to Charleroi, and was later acquired by them on permanent basis for €1.5 million in mid-2019.

On 11 October 2021, he extended his contract at Charleroi until 2024.

On 13 August 2024, Morioka returned to Vissel Kobe.

On 31 March 2025, Morioka announced his retirement from football, ending his 14-year-long professional career.

== Career statistics ==
=== Club ===
Appearances and goals by club, season and competition
Club	Season	League			National cup (Note: Includes Emperor's Cup, Polish Cup, Belgian Cup)		League cup (Note: Includes J. League Cup)		Continental		Total	
Club	Season	Division	Apps	Goals	Apps	Goals	Apps	Goals	Apps	Goals	Apps	Goals
Vissel Kobe	2010	J. League Div 1	8	0	0	0	0	0	—		8	0
Vissel Kobe	2011	J. League Div 1	21	2	1	3	2	0	—		24	5
Vissel Kobe	2012	J. League Div 1	20	1	1	0	5	1	—		26	2
Vissel Kobe	2013	J. League Div 2	18	5	1	0	—		—		19	5
Vissel Kobe	2014	J. League Div 1	34	4	1	0	6	2	—		41	6
Vissel Kobe	2015	J1 League	30	5	2	1	10	2	—		42	8
Vissel Kobe	Total		131	17	6	4	23	5	—		160	26
Śląsk Wrocław	2015–16	Ekstraklasa	15	7	0	0	—		—		15	7
Śląsk Wrocław	2016–17	Ekstraklasa	36	8	2	0	—		—		38	8
Śląsk Wrocław	Total		51	15	2	0	—		—		53	15
Waasland-Beveren	2017–18	First Division A	24	7	3	2	—		—		27	9
Anderlecht	2017–18	First Division A	16	6	0	0	—		0	0	16	6
Anderlecht	2018–19	First Division A	6	0	1	0	—		3 (Note: Appearances in UEFA Europa League)	0	10	0
Anderlecht	Total		22	6	1	0	—		3	0	26	6
Charleroi (loan)	2018–19	First Division A	15	4	0	0	—		—		15	4
Charleroi	2019–20	First Division A	29	6	2	0	—		—		31	6
Charleroi	2020–21	First Division A	28	2	1	0	—		2	0	31	2
Charleroi	2021–22	First Division A	36	4	1	0	—		—		37	4
Charleroi	2022–23	Belgian Pro League	22	3	1	0	—		—		23	3
Charleroi	2023–24	Belgian Pro League	23	0	0	0	—		—		23	0
Charleroi	Total		153	19	5	0	—		2	0	160	19
Vissel Kobe	2024	J1 League	0	0	1	1	—		1 (Note: Appearance in AFC Champions League Elite)	0	2	1
Career total			381	64	18	7	23	5	6	0	428	76

=== International ===
Appearances and goals by national team and year
National team	Year	Apps	Goals
Japan	2014	2	0
Japan	2017	2	0
Japan	2018	1	0
Total		5	0

== Honours ==
Vissel Kobe

- J1 League: 2024
- Emperor's Cup: 2024
