= Nicolas Penneteau =

French footballer (born 1981)

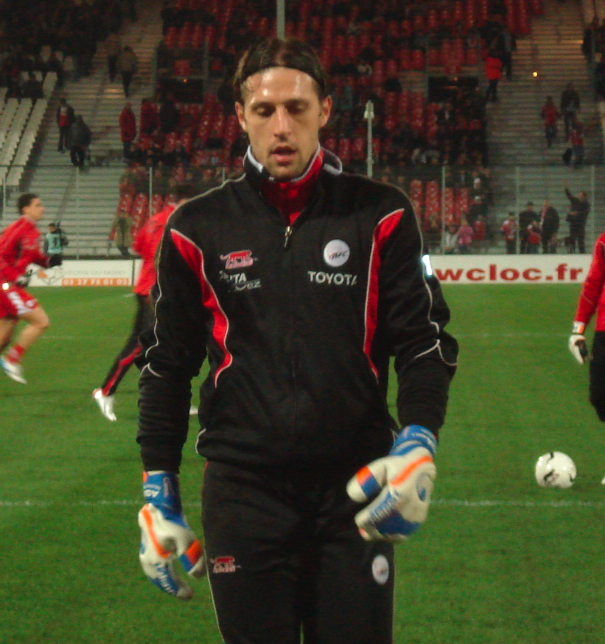
- Penneteau with Valenciennes in 2007

Personal information
- Date of birth: 20 February 1981 (age 45)
- Place of birth: Marseille, France
- Height: 1.85 m (6 ft 1 in)
- Position: Goalkeeper

Senior career*
Years	Team	Apps	(Gls)
1998–2006	Bastia	180	(0)
2006–2014	Valenciennes	266	(0)
2014–2021	Charleroi	176	(0)
2021–2023	Reims	0	(0)
Total		622	(0)

International career
2001–2002	France U20	11	(0)
2002–2003	France U21	12	(0)
2009–	Corsica	5	(0)
- * Club domestic league appearances and goals

Nicolas Penneteau (born 20 February 1981) is a French former professional footballer who played as a goalkeeper.

== Career ==
Penneteau was born in Marseille. By March 2014, he had made over 400 Ligue 1 appearances in a career with Bastia and Valenciennes.

He joined Corsican football team Bastia to play with them in the Corsica Cup 2010.

He made 159 consecutive Ligue 1 appearances for Valenciennes from 2010 to 2014.

In August 2014, Penneteau left France for the first time, signing a two-year contract with Sporting Charleroi.

== See also ==
- List of Corsican people
