= Stade du Pays de Charleroi =

Football stadium in Charleroi, Belgium

Coordinates: 50°24′53″N 4°27′14″E

- Mambourg
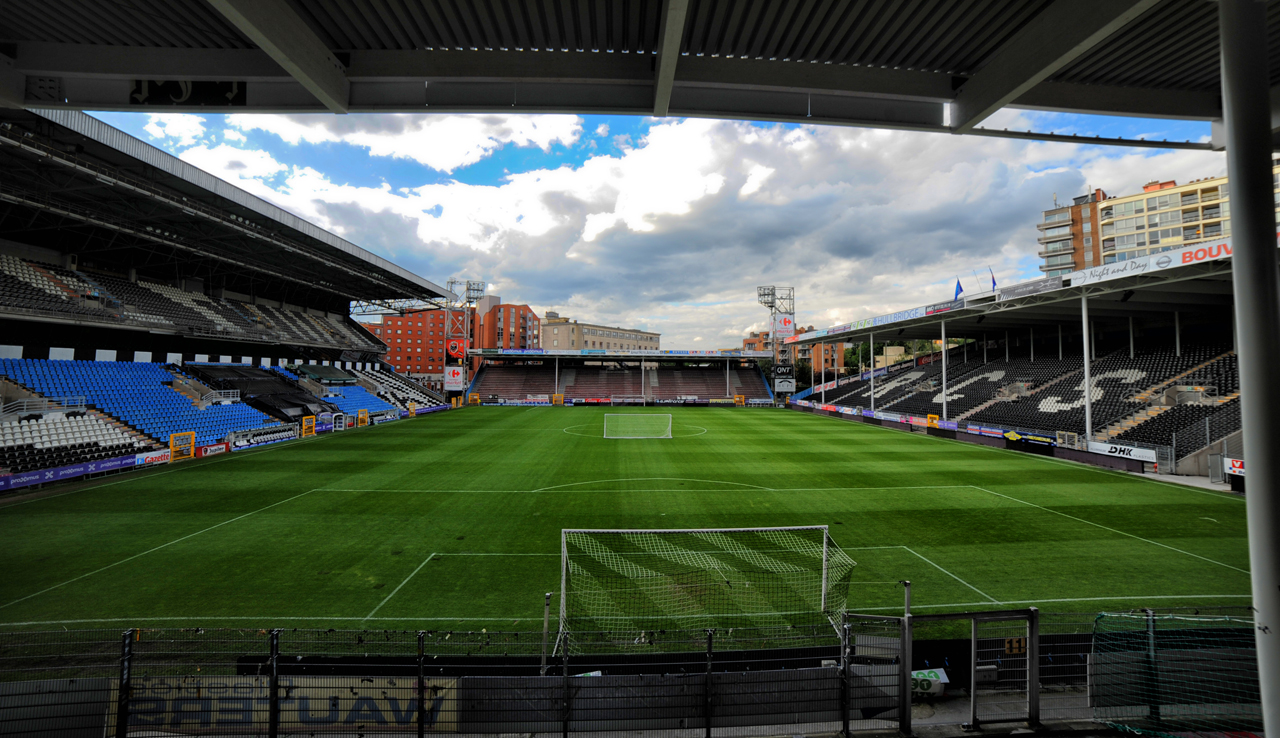
- Interactive map of Stade du Pays de Charleroi
- Location: Boulevard Zoé Drio, Charleroi, Belgium
- Capacity: 15,000

Construction
- Opened: 1939

Tenants
- Sporting Charleroi

Stade du Pays de Charleroi is a football stadium in the city of Charleroi, Belgium. It was built for the 2000 UEFA European Championship in Belgium and the Netherlands in replacement of the old stadium known as Mambourg. The name Stade du Mambourg officially changed in front of 25,000 spectators on 24 May 1999 during the inaugural match between Sporting and Metz. It is the home of Sporting Charleroi. Its capacity was 30,000 for Euro 2000 but was reduced shortly after to 25,000 in line with Charleroi's average attendances. The capacity was reduced again in 2013 to 15,000. After the capacity reduction, the stands T2, T3, T4 were covered by a new roof. Between 2014 and 2015, minor adjustments to the seating and compliance of the stands for European competitions have been made. The future of this structure of Charleroi is in doubt as the club plans to move to a brand new stadium in the periphery of the city.

== Important matches ==
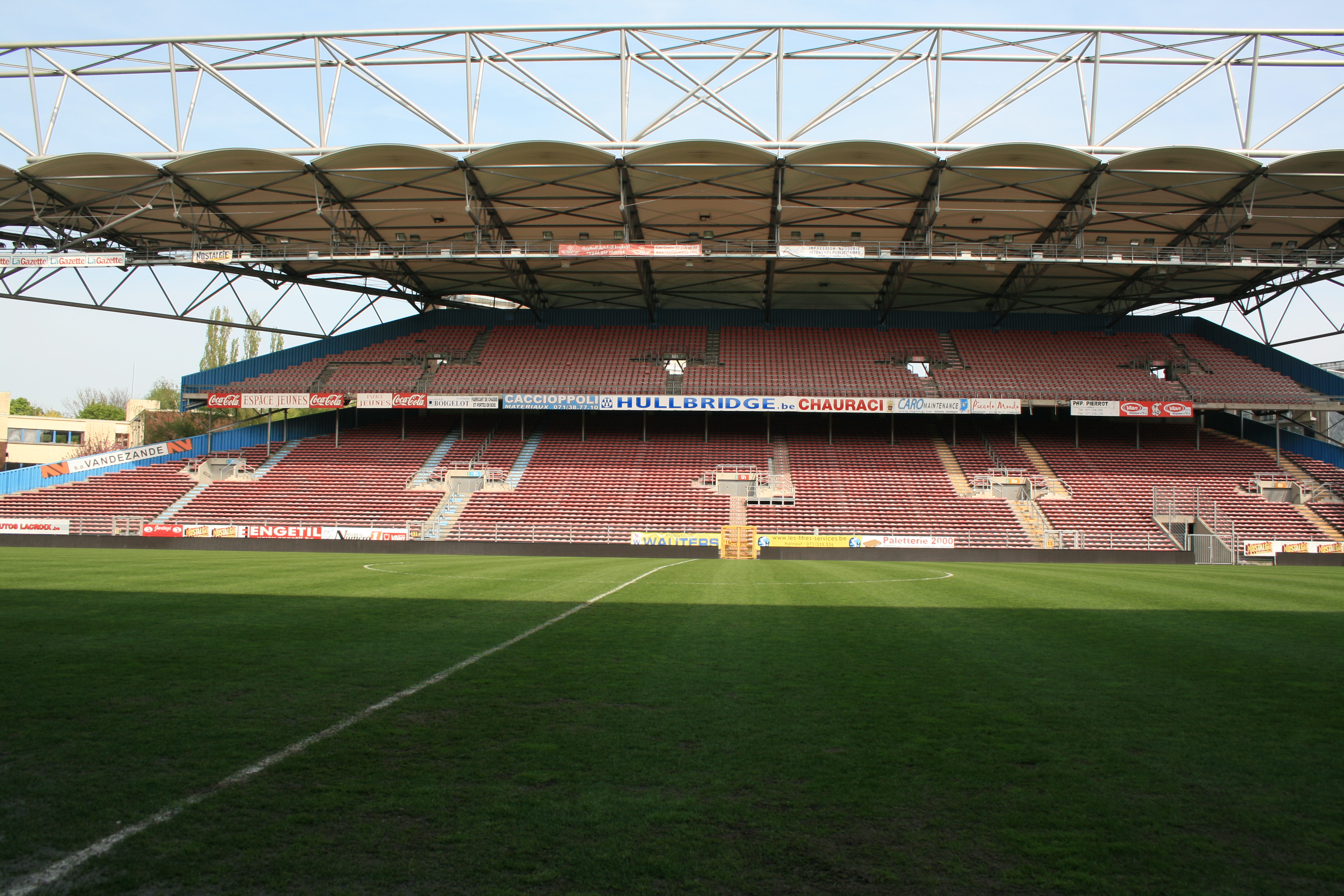
Stade du Pays de Charleroi in 2011 prior to reconstruction

- 2000 UEFA European Championship Group Stage:

Date		Result		Round
13 June 2000	FR Yugoslavia	3–3	Slovenia	Group C
17 June 2000	England	1–0	Germany	Group A
20 June 2000	England	2–3	Romania	Group A

- 2003-04 UEFA Cup
  - R.A.A. Louviéroise 1 - 1 S.L. Benfica
- Football World Cup 2006 - European Qualification Groups
  - Belgium 1 - 1 Lithuania
