= 2025–26 Royal Charleroi SC season =

Charleroi
2025–26 season
- Manager: Rik De Mil (until 10 December); Hans Cornelis (10 December (Note: Interim until 6 January.)–7 April); Mario Kohnen (caretaker, from 8 April)
- Stadium: Stade du Pays de Charleroi
- Belgian Pro League Regular season: 11th
- Belgian Pro League Europe play-offs: 3rd
- Belgian Cup: Semi-finals
- UEFA Conference League: Second qualifying round
- Biggest win: Charleroi 3–1 Dender

The 2025–26 Royal Charleroi S.C. season was the club's 122nd season in existence, as well as its 14th consecutive season in the Belgian Pro League, the highest level of the Belgian football league system. Charleroi also took part in the 2025-26 Belgian Cup and the 2025-26 UEFA Conference League.

== Transfers ==
=== In ===
Pos.	Player	Transferred from	Fee	Date	Source
FW	(Algeria) Ahmed Nadhir Benbouali	(Hungary) Győri ETO FC	Loan return	30 June 2025	
DF	(Morocco) Mehdi Boukamir	(Cyprus) Pafos	Loan return	30 June 2025	
FW	(Palestine) Oday Dabbagh	(Scotland) Aberdeen	Loan return	30 June 2025	
FW	(Belgium) Anthony Descotte	(Netherlands) FC Utrecht	Loan return	30 June 2025	
FW	(Haiti) Mondy Prunier	(Belgium) Francs Borains	Loan return	30 June 2025	
FW	(Belgium) Youssuf Sylla	(Netherlands) Willem II	Loan return	30 June 2025	
FW	(Norway) Jakob Napoleon Romsaas	(Norway) Tromsø	€2,000,000	1 July 2025	
FW	(France) Freddy Mbemba	(France) Versailles 78	Undisclosed	4 July 2025	
FW	(Belgium) Antoine Colassin	(Belgium) Beerschot	Undisclosed	8 July 2025	
FW	(France) Aurélien Scheidler	(Belgium) FCV Dender	€1,700,000	19 August 2025	
DF	(Algeria) Kevin Van Den Kerkhof	(France) FC Metz	Loan	20 August 2025	
DF	(France) Jules Gaudin	(France) Paris FC	Undisclosed	21 August 2025	
MF	(Germany) Patrick Pflücke	(Belgium) Mechelen	€400,000	2 September 2025	
FW	(Poland) Filip Szymczak	(Poland) Lech Poznań	Loan	3 September 2025	
DF	(Switzerland) Lewin Blum	(Switzerland) Young Boys	Loan	6 September 2025	
FW	(Serbia) Slobodan Stanojlović	(Serbia) OFK Beograd	Undisclosed	21 January 2026	

=== Out ===
Pos.	Player	Transferred to	Fee	Date	Source
MF	(France) Alexis Flips	(Belgium) Anderlecht	Loan return	30 June 2025	
FW	(France) Grejohn Kyei	(Belgium) Standard de Liège	Loan return	30 June 2025	
MF	(Belgium) Daan Heymans	(Belgium) Genk	€3,000,000	1 July 2025	
MF	(Algeria) Adem Zorgane	(Belgium) Union Saint-Gilloise	€4,300,000	1 July 2025	
FW	(Algeria) Ahmed Nadhir Benbouali	(Hungary) Győri ETO FC	Undisclosed	17 July 2025	
FW	(Palestine) Oday Dabbagh	(Egypt) Zamalek	€350,000	5 August 2025	
DF	(Cyprus) Stelios Andreou	(Poland) Widzew Łódź	Undisclosed	12 August 2025	
DF	(Norway) Vetle Dragsnes	(Norway) SK Brann	Undisclosed	19 August 2025	
FW	(Belgium) Anthony Descotte	(Netherlands) FC Volendam	Loan	19 August 2025	
FW	(Serbia) Nikola Štulić	(Italy) Lecce	€5,000,000	27 August 2025	
FW	(Belgium) Youssuf Sylla	(Poland) Jagiellonia Białystok	Free	31 August 2025	
DF	(Martinique) Jeremy Petris	(England) Watford	€2,000,000	1 September 2025	
FW	(France) Freddy Mbemba	(France) Guingamp	Loan	1 September 2025	
FW	(Haiti) Mondy Prunier	(Belgium) Eupen	Loan	2 September 2025	
DF	(Slovenia) Žan Rogelj	(Poland) Wisła Płock	Loan	8 September 2025	
FW	(Serbia) Slobodan Stanojlović	(Belgium) Francs Borains	Loan	22 January 2026	

== Friendlies ==
27 June 2025	Mons (Belgium)	2–2	(Belgium) Charleroi
20:00			Romsaas 23'; Sylla 53'

5 July 2025	Charleroi (Belgium)	1–1	(Belgium) Gent
Note: The match was played in two halves of 60 minutes each.

8 July 2025	Charleroi (Belgium)	4–1	(Belgium) Beveren
12:30	Stulic 37'; Dabbagh 51', 74'; Descotte 53'

12 July 2025	Charleroi (Belgium)	4–1	(Belgium) RWDM	Marcinelle
	Stulic; Romsaas

12 July 2025	Charleroi (Belgium)	2–1	(Belgium) RFC Liège
	Descotte; Okumu

18 July 2025	sc Heerenveen (Netherlands)	1–0	(Belgium) Charleroi
12:30

18 July 2025	FC Utrecht (Netherlands)	1–2	(Belgium) Charleroi
16:30

== Competitions ==
=== Overall record ===
Competition	First match	Last match	Starting round	Final position	Record							
Competition	First match	Last match	Starting round	Final position	Pld	W	D	L	GF	GA	GD	Win %
Belgian Pro League Regular season	27 July 2025	22 March 2026	Matchday 1	11th	30	9	7	14	38	41	−3	30.00
Europe play-offs	5 April 2026	23 May 2026	Matchday 1	3rd	10	5	2	3	12	8	+4	50.00
Belgian Cup	28 October 2025	11 February 2026	Seventh Round	Semi-finals	5	3	1	1	6	4	+2	60.00
UEFA Conference League	24 July 2025	31 July 2025	Second qualifying round	Second qualifying round	2	0	1	1	1	2	−1	0.00
Total					47	17	11	19	57	55	+2	36.17

Source: Competitions

=== Belgian Pro League ===
==== Regular season ====
Pos	Team	Pld	W	D	L	GF	GA	GD	Pts	Qualification or relegation
9	Westerlo	30	10	9	11	36	40	−4	39	Qualification for the Europe play-offs
10	Antwerp	30	9	8	13	31	32	−1	35	Qualification for the Europe play-offs
11	Charleroi	30	9	7	14	38	42	−4	34	Qualification for the Europe play-offs
12	OH Leuven	30	9	7	14	32	43	−11	34	Qualification for the Europe play-offs
13	Zulte Waregem	30	8	8	14	38	47	−9	32	Qualification for the Relegation play-offs

Source: Jupiler Pro League (in Dutch)
Rules for classification: 1) Points; 2) Matches won; 3) Goal difference; 4) Goals scored; 5) Away matches won; 6) Away goal difference; 7) Away goals scored; 8) Play-off.

==== Results by round ====
The color of the Position cell refers to being in Champions' Play-offs (green), Europe Play-offs (blue), or Relegation play-offs (red). Blank Position cells are rounds where not all teams have played the same number of matches, so a true ranking was not possible.

Round	1	2	3	4	5	6	7	8	9	10	11	12	13	14	15	16	17	18	19	20	21	22	23	24	25	26	27	28	29	30
Ground	A	H	A	H	A	H	A	H	H	A	A	H	A	H	A	H	A	H	H	A	H	A	A	H	H	A	H	A	H	A
Result	D	D	L	D	W	W	W	L	L	L	L	W	L	W	L	D	L	D	D	W	W	W	W	L	L	L	L	D	L	L
Position	5	9	12	14				6	8	10	12	10	12	9	9	10	12	12	12	11	9	7	6	7	8	10	11	11	11	11

Updated to match(es) played on 22 March 2026. Source: soccerstats.com
A = Away; H = Home; W = Win; D = Draw; L = Loss; P = Postponed

==== Matches ====
27 July 2025 1	OH Leuven	2–2	Charleroi	Leuven
16:00 UTC+2	Maertens 3', (yellow card) 61'; Gil (yellow card) 70'; Maziz 79'		Camara (yellow card) 77'; Bernier 90'; Dragsnes 90+4'; Romsaas (yellow card) 90+5'	Stadium: Den Dreef; Referee: Nathan Verboomen

3 August 2025 2	Charleroi	1–1	Sint-Truiden	Charleroi
19:15 UTC+2	Štulić 41' (yellow card) 59' (red card) 65'		Ito 24' (pen.)	Stadium: Stade du Pays de Charleroi; Attendance: 6,000; Referee: Kevin Van Damme

10 August 2025 3	La Louvière	1–0	Charleroi	La Louvière
13:30 UTC+2	Camara 16' (o.g.)			Stadium: Easi Arena; Attendance: 8,001; Referee: Nicolas Laforge

17 August 2025 4	Charleroi	1–1	Antwerp	Charleroi
18:30 UTC+2	Guiagon 34'		Adekami 13'	Stadium: Stade du Pays de Charleroi; Attendance: 8,001; Referee: Simon Bourdeaud'hui

30 August 2025 6	Charleroi	3–1	Dender	Charleroi
20:45 UTC+2	Guiagon 5' (pen.), 88'; Bernier 50'		Kadiri 67'	Stadium: Stade du Pays de Charleroi; Referee: Wesli De Cremer

14 September 2025 7	Cercle Brugge	2–3	Charleroi	Bruges
16:00 UTC+2	Ngoura 54'; Gerkens 87'; Nazinho (yellow card) 90+3'		Pflücke 2'; Titraoui 39'; Ousou (yellow card) 51'; Scheidler 56'; Camara (yellow card) 90'	Stadium: Jan Breydel Stadium; Attendance: 4,999; Referee: Jasper Vergoote

17 September 2025 5	Genk	0–1	Charleroi	Genk
20:30 UTC+2			Scheidler 16'; Camara (yellow card) 45+1'; Blum (yellow card) 53'	Stadium: Cegeka Arena

20 September 2025 8	Charleroi	1–2	Zulte Waregem	Charleroi
18:15 UTC+2	Pflücke 15'; Ousou (red card) 24'; Keita (yellow card) 62'; Van Den Kerkhof (yellow card) 73'; Blum (yellow card) 80'		Opoku 62'; Kiilerich (yellow card) 67'; Vossen 90+4'	Stadium: Stade du Pays de Charleroi

28 September 2025 9	Charleroi	0–2	Mechelen	Charleroi
18:30 UTC+2			van Brederode 35'; Lauberbach 40', (yellow card) 70'; Mirás (yellow card) 83'; Mrabti (yellow card) 90'; Servais (yellow card) 90+3'	Stadium: Stade du Pays de Charleroi; Referee: Bram van Driessche

3 October 2025 10	Gent	2–1	Charleroi	Ghent
20:45 UTC+2	Itō 9'; Samoise (yellow card) 26'; Kanga (yellow card) 69'; Gandelman 71'		Pflücke 28'; Titraoui (yellow card) 50'; Guiton (yellow card) 63'; Camara (yellow card) 81'; Blum (yellow card) 86'	Stadium: Planet Group Arena; Attendance: 12,412; Referee: Lawrence Visser

18 October 2025 11	Union SG	3–1	Charleroi	Brussels
20:45 UTC+2	Florucz 16'; Niang 48'; Rasmussen 74'		Nzita (yellow card) 11'; Ousou (yellow card) 18', (goal) 45+2'; Guiagon (yellow card) 58'	Stadium: Joseph Marien Stadium; Attendance: 6,942; Referee: Simon Bourdeaud'Hui

24 October 2025 12	Charleroi	1–0	Anderlecht	Charleroi
20:45 UTC+2	Guiagon (yellow card) 49'; Keita 82'; Guiton (yellow card) 90+5'		N'Diaye (yellow card) 90+1'; Bertaccini (yellow card) 90+5'	Stadium: Stade du Pays de Charleroi; Attendance: 9,984; Referee: Lawrence Visser

31 October 2025 13	Standard Liège	3–1	Charleroi	Liège
20:45 UTC+2	Karamoko (yellow card) 24'; Nzita 26' (o.g.); Henry 47'; Said 58'; Kuavita (yellow card) 83'		Guiagon 40'; Titraoui (yellow card) 55'; Khalifi (yellow card) 88'; Ousou (yellow card) 90+4'	Stadium: Stade Maurice Dufrasne; Attendance: 20,999; Referee: Erik Lambrechts

8 November 2025 14	Charleroi	2–0	Westerlo	Charleroi
18:15 UTC+2	Titraoui 44', (yellow card) 78'; Guiagon (yellow card) 64'; Scheidler 70'		Sayyadmanesh (yellow card) 82'	Stadium: Stade du Pays de Charleroi; Attendance: 5,461; Referee: Bert Verbeke

22 November 2025 15	Club Brugge	1–0	Charleroi	Bruges
20:45 UTC+2	Vanaken 59'; Onyedika (yellow card) 88'; Vetlesen (yellow card) 90+7'		Ousou (yellow card) 90+7'	Stadium: Jan Breydel Stadium; Attendance: 18,640; Referee: Simon Bourdeaud'Hui

29 November 2025 16	Charleroi	0–0	La Louvière	Charleroi
20:45 UTC+2			Okou (yellow card) 39'	Stadium: Stade du Pays de Charleroi; Attendance: 8,454; Referee: Bram van Driessche

7 December 2025 17	Mechelen	1–0	Charleroi	Mechelen
13:30 UTC+2	Koudou 15', (yellow card) 89'; Struyf (yellow card) 29'; Mrabti (yellow card) 35'; van Brederode (yellow card) 71'		Scheidler (yellow card) 84'; Szymczak (yellow card) 90+4'	Stadium: AFAS Stadion; Attendance: 9,683; Referee: Nicolas Laforge

14 December 2025 18	Charleroi	1–1	Union SG	Charleroi
18:30 UTC+2	Colassin 81'; Bernier (yellow card) 84'		David 39'; Mac Allister (yellow card) 48'; Sykes (yellow card) 90+3'	Stadium: Stade du Pays de Charleroi; Attendance: 7,425; Referee: Lawrence Visser

19 December 2025 19	Charleroi	2–2	Genk	Charleroi
20:45 UTC+2	Keita (yellow card) 23'; Titraoui 42', (yellow card) 73'; Guiagon 89'		Heynen 14', 69'	Stadium: Stade du Pays de Charleroi; Attendance: 6,140; Referee: Simon Bourdeaud'Hui

26 December 2025 20	Anderlecht	1–2	Charleroi	Anderlecht
20:45 UTC+2	Hazard 24' (pen.); Hey (yellow card) 25'		Camara 12', (yellow card) 38'; Guiagon 15'; Bernier (yellow card) 44'; Blum (yellow card) 77'; Titraoui (yellow card) 90+2'	Stadium: Lotto Park; Referee: Bram van Driessche

18 January 2026 21	Charleroi	2–0	Standard Liège	Charleroi
18:30 UTC+2	Scheidler 6'; Bernier 23'; Ousou (yellow card) 83'; Gaudin (yellow card) 90+3'	Report	Teuma (yellow card) 83'	Stadium: Stade du Pays de Charleroi; Referee: Jasper Vergoote

25 January 2026 22	Antwerp	0–2	Charleroi	Antwerp
13:30 UTC+2	Scheidler 8'; Camara (yellow card) 45'; Titraoui (yellow card) 50'; Guiagon 56' (pen.)	Report	Somers (yellow card) 36'; Janssen (yellow card) 72'	Stadium: Bosuilstadion; Referee: Jan Boterberg

31 January 2026 23	Sint-Truiden	0–2	Charleroi	Sint-Truiden
20:45 UTC+2	Sebaoui (yellow card) 36'; Muja (red card) 39'; Gotō (yellow card) 80'	Report	Camara (yellow card) 36'; Bernier (yellow card) 40'; Khalifi (yellow card) 55'; Titraoui 62'; Romsaas 84'	Stadium: Stayen; Referee: Bert Verbeke

7 February 2026 24	Charleroi	3–4	Cercle Brugge	Charleroi
18:15 UTC+2	Scheidler 16' (pen.); Guiagon 57', (yellow card) 83'; Cornelis (yellow card) 66'; Van Den Kerkhof 79'; Ousou (yellow card) 90+4'; Gaudin (red card) 90+9'		Magnée 10' (pen.), 67' (pen.); Nazinho 27', (yellow card) 90+1'; O. Diakité 33', (red card) 45+1'; I. Diakité (yellow card) 76'; De Wilde (yellow card) 90'	Stadium: Stade du Pays de Charleroi; Referee: Bert Put

14 February 2026 25	Charleroi	2–3	Gent	Charleroi
18:15 UTC+2	Keita 66'; Ousou 87'	Report	Itō 10', (yellow card) 90+1'; Skóraś (yellow card) 37'; Dean 58', (yellow card) 59', (goal) 70' (pen.)	Stadium: Stade du Pays de Charleroi; Referee: Erik Lambrechts

22 February 2026 26	Westerlo	2–1	Charleroi	Westerlo
19:15 UTC+2	Sayyadmanesh 41' (pen.); Haspolat (yellow card) 60'; Sakamoto 90+2'; Bayram (yellow card) 90+5'	Report	Van Den Kerkhof 29'; Nzita (yellow card) 54'; Ousou (yellow card) 76'	Stadium: Het Kuipje; Referee: Kevin Van Damme

1 March 2026 27	Charleroi	1–2	Club Brugge	Charleroi
18:30 UTC+2	Keita 35', (yellow card) 90+13'; Camara (yellow card) 45'; Van Den Kerkhof (red card) 61'; Koné (yellow card) 90+7'; Blum (yellow card) 90+8'; Scheidler (yellow card) 90+13'	Report	Tzolis 74' (pen.); Forbs (yellow card) 90+3'; Ordóñez 90+10'	Stadium: Stade du Pays de Charleroi; Referee: Bert Verbeke

7 March 2026 28	Dender	2–2	Charleroi	Denderleeuw
18:15 UTC+2	Květ 21'; Hrnčár 39'; Kadiri (yellow card) 90+6'	Report	Scheidler 6'; Colassin 78'; Titraoui (yellow card) 90+3'	Stadium: Dender Football Complex; Referee: Jan Boterberg

14 March 2026 29	Charleroi	0–2	OH Leuven	Charleroi
16:00 UTC+2	Guiagon (yellow card) 51'	Report	Gil (yellow card) 36', (goal) 70'; Dussenne 74'	Stadium: Stade du Pays de Charleroi; Referee: Jasper Vergoote

22 March 2026 30	Zulte Waregem	1–0	Charleroi	Waregem
18:30 UTC+2	Erenbjerg 41'; Gabriël (yellow card) 85'	Report	Keita (yellow card) 27'; Ousou (yellow card) 71'	Stadium: Elindus Arena; Referee: Bram Van Driessche

==== Europe play-offs ====
Pos	Team	Pld	W	D	L	GF	GA	GD	Pts	Qualification or relegation
1	Genk	10	4	5	1	11	6	+5	38	Qualification for the European competition play-off
2	Standard Liège	10	5	2	3	17	11	+6	37	
3	Charleroi	10	5	2	3	12	8	+4	34	
4	Westerlo	10	4	1	5	14	17	−3	33	
5	Antwerp	10	4	1	5	12	16	−4	31	
6	OH Leuven	10	1	3	6	9	17	−8	23	

Source: Jupiler Pro League (in Dutch), Soccerway
Rules for classification: 1) Points; 2) Points without (possible) half points added due to rounding; 3) Regular season finishing position.

=== Belgian Cup ===
28 October 2025 Seventh Round	RFC Liège	0–1	Charleroi	Liège
20:30 CET (UTC+1)	Shkurti (yellow card) 82'	Report	Camara (yellow card) 31'; Romsaas (yellow card) 36'; Keita (yellow card) 89'; Khalifi 90+1'; Blum (yellow card) 90+3'	Stadium: Stade de Rocourt; Attendance: 1,000; Referee: Massimiliano Medda

4 December 2025 Round of 16	Charleroi	2–0	Mechelen	Charleroi
20:30 CET (UTC+1)	Guiagon 52' (pen.); Nzita (yellow card) 68', (goal) 75'; Camara (yellow card) 82'	Report	Zekri (yellow card) 51'; Hammar (yellow card) 90+1'	Stadium: Stade du Pays de Charleroi; Attendance: 9,684; Referee: Lothar D'Hondt

13 January 2026 Quarter-finals	Charleroi	2–0	Club Brugge	Charleroi
20:30 CET (UTC+1)	Guiagon 21' (pen.), 45+3'; Gaudin (yellow card) 90+8'	Report	Tzolis (yellow card) 90+7'; Campbell (red card) 90+7'	Stadium: Stade du Pays de Charleroi; Attendance: 15,000; Referee: Erik Lambrechts

4 February 2026 Semi-finals First Leg	Charleroi	0–0	Union SG	Charleroi
20:30 CET (UTC+1)	Camara (yellow card) 89'	Report	Sykes (yellow card) 37'	Stadium: Stade du Pays de Charleroi

11 February 2026 Semi-finals Second Leg	Union SG	4–1 (4–1 agg.)	Charleroi	Forest
20:30 CET (UTC+1)	David 1'; Mac Allister (yellow card) 19'; Fuseini 50'; Sykes 84'; Khalaili (yellow card) 90+2'; Florucz 90+3'	Report	Scheidler 3'; Titraoui (yellow card) 27'; Boukamir (yellow card) 57'; Blum (yellow card) 80'	Stadium: Joseph Marien Stadium

=== UEFA Conference League ===
==== Second qualifying round ====
24 July 2025 First leg	Hammarby (Sweden)	0–0	(Belgium) Charleroi	Stockholm, Sweden
19:00	Abraham (yellow card) 11'; Pinas (yellow card) 58'; Madjed (yellow card) 89'; Tounekti (yellow card) 90+7'		Štulić (yellow card) 19'; Guiagon (yellow card) 63'; Titraoui (yellow card) 79'; Petris (yellow card) 89'	Stadium: 3Arena; Attendance: 20,855; Referee: Mathieu Vernice (France)

31 July 2025 Second leg	Charleroi (Belgium)	1–2 (a.e.t.) (1–2 agg.)	(Sweden) Hammarby	Charleroi
20:00	Štulić 47'		Erabi 21'; Eriksson 119'	Stadium: Stade du Pays de Charleroi; Attendance: 12,842; Referee: Vitālijs Spasjoņņikovs (Latvia)
