= 2024–25 Royal Charleroi SC season =

Charleroi
2024–25 season
- Chairman: Fabien Debecq
- Managing Director: Mehdi Bayat
- Manager: Rik De Mil
- Stadium: Stade du Pays de Charleroi
- Belgian Pro League: 10th
- Europe play-offs: Winners
- Belgian Cup: Seventh round
- Top goalscorer: League: Nikola Štulić (16); All: Nikola Štulić (16)
Home colours	Away colours

The 2024–25 season was the 121st season in the history of the Royal Charleroi S.C., and the club's 13th consecutive season in Belgian Pro League. In addition to the domestic league, the team participated in the Belgian Cup.

== Squad ==
Position	Number	Player	Date joined	Further data
GK	12	(Belgium) Nicolas Closset		
GK	55	(Belgium) Martin Delavallée		
GK	33	(Belgium) Théo Defourny	2024	
DF	15	(Norway) Vetle Dragsnes	2023	
DF	21	(Cyprus) Stelios Andreou	2021	
DF	24	(Belgium) Mardochee Nzita	2024	
DF		(Syria) Aiham Ousou	2024	
MF	5	(France) Etienne Camara	2024	
MF	6	(Algeria) Adem Zorgane	2021	
MF	8	(Belgium) Parfait Guiagon	2023	
MF	17	(Belgium) Antoine Bernier	2023	
MF	18	(Belgium) Daan Heymans	2022	
MF	29	(Slovenia) Žan Rogelj	2023	
MF	98	(France) Jeremy Petris	2024	
MF		(Belgium) Noam Mayoka-Tika	2024	
FW	7	(Belgium) Isaac Mbenza	2022	
FW	9	(Palestine) Oday Dabbagh	2023	
FW	19	(Serbia) Nikola Štulić	2023	

== Transfers ==
=== In ===
Pos.	Player	Transferred from	Fee	Date	Source
DF	(Belgium) Martin Wasinski	(Belgium) Kortrijk	Loan return	30 June 2024	
MF	(France) José Capon	(France) Stade Rennais B	Free	1 July 2024	
DF	(Belgium) Mardochee Nzita	(Belgium) Beerschot	Undisclosed	1 July 2024	
GK	(Belgium) Théo Defourny	(Belgium) RWDM	Undisclosed	1 July 2024	
MF	(Belgium) Noam Mayoka-Tika	(France) Olympique de Marseille	Undisclosed	1 July 2024	
GK	(Ivory Coast) Mohamed Koné	(France) Le Havre AC	Undisclosed	2 July 2024	
DF	(France) Cheick Keita	(France) Reims	Undisclosed	4 July 2024	
MF	(Ghana) Raymond Asante	(Italy) Udinese Primavera	Loan	12 July 2024	
MF	(Algeria) Yacine Titraoui	(Algeria) Paradou AC	Undisclosed	12 July 2024	
FW	(Haiti) Mondy Prunier	(France) FC Versailles	Undisclosed	31 July 2024	
DF	(Syria) Aiham Ousou	(Czech Republic) Slavia Prague	Loan	31 July 2024	
DF	(Syria) Aiham Ousou	(Czech Republic) Slavia Prague	€1,800,000	1 January 2025	

=== Out ===
Pos.	Player	Transferred to	Fee	Date	Source
DF	(Morocco) Achraf Dari	(France) Brest	Loan return	30 June 2024	
DF	(Belgium) Martin Wasinski	(Germany) Schalke 04	End of contract	1 July 2024	
DF	(Cameroon) Jackson Tchatchoua	(Italy) Hellas Verona	Undislosed	1 July 2024	
GK	(Burkina Faso) Hervé Koffi	(France) RC Lens	Undislosed	1 July 2024	
DF	(Denmark) Jonas Bager	(Sweden) IFK Göteborg	End of contract	1 July 2024	
MF	(Japan) Ryota Morioka	(Japan) Vissel Kobe	End of contract	1 July 2024	
DF	(Belgium) Roméo Monticelli	(Belgium) OH Leuven U23	End of contract	1 July 2024	
DF	(Nigeria) Valentine Ozornwafor		End of contract	1 July 2024	
MF	(Madagascar) Marco Ilaimaharitra	(Belgium) Kortrijk	End of contract	1 July 2024	
DF	(Belgium) Jules Van Cleemput	(Belgium) KV Mechelen	End of contract	1 July 2024	
DF	(France) Damien Marcq		End of contract	1 July 2024	
GK	(France) Pierre Patron	(France) Quevilly-Rouen	End of contract	1 July 2024	
DF	(Switzerland) Stefan Knežević	(Switzerland) FC Luzern	End of contract	1 July 2024	
FW	(Haiti) Mondy Prunier	(Belgium) Francs Borains	Loan	31 July 2024	
FW	(Senegal) Youssouph Badji	(Denmark) AGF	€1,400,000	2 September 2024	
FW	(Algeria) Ahmed Nadhir Benbouali	(Hungary) Győri ETO FC	Loan	3 September 2024	
DF	(Morocco) Mehdi Boukamir	(Cyprus) Pafos	Loan	9 September 2024	
FW	(Belgium) Youssuf Sylla	(Netherlands) Willem II	Loan	4 January 2025	
FW	(Palestine) Oday Dabbagh	(Scotland) Aberdeen	Loan	3 February 2025	

== Friendlies ==
28 June 2024 Friendly	RAEC Mons (Belgium)	0–3	(Belgium) Charleroi	Mons
20:00			Štulić; Zorgane	Stadium: Stade Charles Tondreau

6 July 2024 Friendly	Genk (Belgium)	3–3	(Belgium) Charleroi	Genk
12:00	Nkuba 37'; Zeqiri 91'; El Ouahdi 103'		Guiagon 42'; Heymans 60'; Benbouali 65'	Stadium: Jos Vaessen Talent Academy
Note: 2 x 60 minutes

9 July 2024 Friendly	Charleroi (Belgium)	3–0	(Luxembourg) Swift Hesperange	Marcinelle
	Mbenza 24'; Heymans 48' (pen.); Guiagon 63'	Report
Note: One period of 60 minutes and a second period of 45 minutes.

13 July 2024 Friendly	Charleroi (Belgium)	3–0	(Belgium) Beerschot	Tubize
11:00	Heymans 15', 80'; Guiagon 29'	Report
Note: Behind closed doors

13 July 2024 Friendly	Charleroi (Belgium)	2–0	(Belgium) Zulte Waregem	Tubize
14:30	Nzita 39'; Sow 67'
Note: Behind closed doors

17 July 2024 Friendly	RKC Waalwijk (Netherlands)	1–1	(Belgium) Charleroi	Netherlands
			Štulić

19 July 2024 Friendly	NAC Breda (Netherlands)	1–2	(Belgium) Charleroi	Zundert, Netherlands
UTZ	Boere 80'		Sylla 58'; Zorgane 73'

30 July 2024 Friendly	Charleroi (Belgium)	3–1	(Belgium) RFC Liège	Marcinelle
	Badji; Asante; Dalle Molle	Report

4 August 2024 Friendly	Francs Borains (Belgium)	1–2	(Belgium) Charleroi
18:30	Lavie 83'		Badji 11'; Benaets 16'

19 August 2024 Friendly	Charleroi (Belgium)	2–1	(Belgium) RAEC Mons	Marcinelle
12:00	Dabbagh; Mbenza

6 January 2025 Friendly	Charleroi (Belgium)	2–1	(Belgium) Kortrijk	Tubize
	Dabbagh; Mbenza	Report		Stadium: National Centre

== Competitions ==
=== Overall record ===
Competition	First match	Last match	Starting round	Final position	Record							
Competition	First match	Last match	Starting round	Final position	Pld	W	D	L	GF	GA	GD	Win %
Belgian Pro League regular season	28 July 2024	14–16 March 2025	Matchday 1	10th	30	10	7	13	36	36	+0	33.33
Europe play-offs	28 March 2025	29 May 2025	Matchday 1	Winners	11	7	3	1	21	11	+10	63.64
Belgian Cup	29 October 2024		Seventh round	Seventh round	1	0	0	1	1	4	−3	0.00
Total					42	17	10	15	58	51	+7	40.48

Source: Soccerway

=== Belgian Pro League ===
==== Regular season ====
Pos	Team	Pld	W	D	L	GF	GA	GD	Pts	Qualification or relegation
8	Mechelen	30	10	8	12	45	40	+5	38	Qualification for the Europe play-offs
9	Westerlo	30	10	7	13	50	49	+1	37	Qualification for the Europe play-offs
10	Charleroi	30	10	7	13	36	36	0	37	Qualification for the Europe play-offs
11	OH Leuven	30	8	13	9	28	33	−5	37	Qualification for the Europe play-offs
12	Dender EH	30	8	8	14	33	51	−18	32	Qualification for the Europe play-offs

Source: Jupiler Pro League (in Dutch), Soccerway
Rules for classification: 1) Points; 2) Matches won; 3) Goal difference; 4) Goals scored; 5) Away matches won; 6) Away goal difference; 7) Away goals scored; 8) Play-off.

==== Results summary ====
Overall								Home						Away					
Pld	W	D	L	GF	GA	GD	Pts	W	D	L	GF	GA	GD	W	D	L	GF	GA	GD
20	8	3	9	21	23	−2	27	5	2	2	10	6	+4	3	1	7	11	17	−6

==== Results by round ====
Round	1
Ground	
Result	
Position	

Updated to match(es) played on 26 December 2024. Source:
A = Away; H = Home; W = Win; D = Draw; L = Loss

==== Matches ====
The schedule was released on 11 June 2024.

28 July 2024 1	Charleroi	0–1	Antwerp	Charleroi
18:30	Petris (yellow card) 15'; Camara (yellow card) 64'; Dragsnes (yellow card) 76'; Titraoui (yellow card) 88'; Heymans (yellow card) 90+1'		Janssen 10', (yellow card) 83'; Odoi (yellow card) 90+2'	Stadium: Stade du Pays de Charleroi; Attendance: 8,000; Referee: Lawrence Visser

3 August 2024 2	Sint-Truiden	1–4	Charleroi	Sint-Truiden
20:45	Van Helden (yellow card) 40'; Zahiroleslam 61'		Heymans 18' (pen.), 30'; Guiagon 43'; Bernier 45+1'; Camara (yellow card) 68'	Stadium: Stayen; Attendance: 4,348; Referee: Bert Put

11 August 2024 3	Charleroi	1–0	Gent	Charleroi
18:30	Camara (yellow card) 32'; Bernier (yellow card) 87'; Heymans 90', (yellow card) 90+7'		Fernandez-Pardo (yellow card) 45+1'	Stadium: Stade du Pays de Charleroi; Referee: Lothar D'Hondt

16 August 2024 4	Union Saint-Gilloise	1–0	Charleroi	Forest
20:45	Moris (yellow card) 90'; Fuseini 90+3' (pen.)		Koné (yellow card) 34'; Keita (yellow card) 47'; Camara (yellow card) 49'; Petris (yellow card) 54'	Stadium: Joseph Marien Stadium; Referee: Nathan Verboomen

25 August 2024 5	Charleroi	1–0	Kortrijk	Charleroi
19:15				Stadium: Stade du Pays de Charleroi; Referee: Kevin Van Damme

31 August 2024 6	Mechelen	5–2	Charleroi	Mechelen
16:00				Stadium: Achter de Kazerne

15 September 2024 7	Charleroi	3–0	Beerschot	Charleroi
18:30				Stadium: Stade du Pays de Charleroi

21 September 2024 8	Anderlecht	0–0	Charleroi	Anderlecht
20:45				Stadium: Lotto Park; Attendance: 16,841; Referee: Jasper Vergoote

27 September 2024 9	Charleroi	1–1	Club Brugge	Charleroi
20:45	Guiagon 48'		Onyedika (red card) 55'; Vanaken 90+1'	Stadium: Stade du Pays de Charleroi; Attendance: 8,450; Referee: Nathan Verboomen

5 October 2024 10	Dender	1–0	Charleroi	Denderleeuw
20:45	Koné 13' (o.g.)			Stadium: Van Roystadion; Referee: Michiel Allaerts

20 October 2024 11	Standard Liège	2–1	Charleroi	Liège
18:30				Stadium: Stade Maurice Dufrasne; Referee: Erik Lambrechts

26 October 2024 12	Charleroi	0–2	OH Leuven	Charleroi
16:00			Ikwuemesi 32', 45+2'	Stadium: Stade du Pays de Charleroi; Referee: Kevin Van Damme

3 November 2024 13	Cercle Brugge	2–0	Charleroi	Bruges
16:00	Denkey 67'; Van der Bruggen 72'			Stadium: Jan Breydel Stadium; Referee: Jasper Vergoote

9 November 2024 14	Charleroi	1–0	Westerlo	Charleroi
20:45	Heymans 67'			Stadium: Stade du Pays de Charleroi; Referee: Bert Put

23 November 2024 15	Genk	3–0	Charleroi	Genk
20:45	Arokodare 77'; Steuckers 83'; Adedeji-Sternberg 90'			Stadium: Cegeka Arena; Referee: Bram Van Driessche

30 November 2024 16	Charleroi	1–1	Standard Liège	Charleroi
20:45	Dabbagh 90+4'		Kuavita 36'	Stadium: Stade du Pays de Charleroi; Referee: Jasper Vergoote

8 December 2024 17	Antwerp	1–3	Charleroi	Antwerp
13:30				Stadium: Bosuilstadion

14 December 2024 18	OH Leuven	1–0	Charleroi	Leuven
18:15

21 December 2024 19	Charleroi	2–1	Sint-Truiden	Charleroi
16:00				Stadium: Stade du Pays de Charleroi

26 December 2024 20	Kortrijk	0–1	Charleroi	Kortrijk
16:00				Stadium: Guldensporen Stadion

11 January 2025 21	Charleroi	1–2	Union Saint-Gilloise	Charleroi
20:45				Stadium: Stade du Pays de Charleroi

9 February 2025 25	Beerchot	1–1	Charleroi

16 February 2025 26	Charleroi	0–1	Anderlecht

22 February 2025 27	Westerlo	1–3	Charleroi

28 February 2025 28	Charleroi	1–1	Genk

8 March 2025 29	Charleroi	0–1	Mechelen

16 March 2025 30	Club Brugge	4–2	Charleroi

==== Europe play-offs ====
Pos	Team	Pld	W	D	L	GF	GA	GD	Pts	Qualification or relegation
1	Charleroi (O)	10	6	3	1	19	10	+9	40	Qualification for the European competition play-off
2	Westerlo	10	3	5	2	19	16	+3	33	
3	Mechelen	10	2	6	2	17	17	0	31	
4	Dender EH	10	3	4	3	20	21	−1	29	

Source: Jupiler Pro League (in Dutch), Soccerway
Rules for classification: 1) Points; 2) Points without (possible) half points added due to rounding; 3) Regular season finishing position.
(O) Play-off winners

===== Results by round =====
Round	1	2	3	4	5	6	7	8	9	10
Ground	A	H	A	H	A	H	A	H	A	H
Result	D	W	D	W	L	W	W	W	D	W
Position										

A = Away; H = Home; W = Win; D = Draw; L = Loss

28 March 2025 1	OH Leuven	0–0	Charleroi

6 April 2025 2	Charleroi	1–0	Standard Liège

11 April 2025 3	Westerlo	2–2	Charleroi

19 April 2025 4	Charleroi	3–0	Mechelen

22 April 2025 5	Dender	2–1	Charleroi

26 April 2025 6	Charleroi	4–1	Dender

4 May 2025 7	Standard Liège	0–1	Charleroi

9 May 2025 8	Charleroi	4–3	Westerlo

18 May 2025 9	Mechelen	1–1	Charleroi

24 May 2025 10	Charleroi	2–1	OH Leuven

===== European competition play-off =====
29 May 2025	Antwerp	1–2	Charleroi	Antwerp
18:30				Stadium: Bosuilstadion

=== Belgian Cup ===
29 October 2024 Seventh round	Patro Eisden	4–1	Charleroi	Maasmechelen
20:00				Stadium: Patro-Stadion

== Statistics ==
=== Goalscorers ===
As of match played 26 December 2024

Rank	Pos.	No.	Nat.	Player	Pro League	Play-offs	Belgian Cup	Total
1	MF	18	(Belgium)	Daan Heymans	8	0	1	9
2	MF	17	(Belgium)	Antoine Bernier	3	0	0	3
2	MF	8	(Ivory Coast)	Parfait Guiagon	3	0	0	3
2	FW	19	(Serbia)	Nikola Štulić	3	0	0	3
5	DF	21	(Cyprus)	Stelios Andreou	1	0	0	1
5	FW	9	(Palestine)	Oday Dabbagh	1	0	0	1
5	FW	99	(France)	Grejohn Kyei	1	0	0	1
5	FW	7	(Belgium)	Isaac Mbenza	1	0	0	1
Own goals					0	0	0	0
Totals					21	0	1	22
