= 2023–24 Royal Charleroi SC season =

Charleroi
2023–24 season
- Chairman: Fabien Debecq
- Managing Director: Mehdi Bayat
- Manager: Felice Mazzù (until 20 March); Rik De Mil (from 22 March)
- Stadium: Stade du Pays de Charleroi
- Belgian Pro League: 13th
- Relegation play-offs: 1st
- Belgian Cup: Eighth round
- Top goalscorer: League: Parfait Guiagon (6); All: Oday Dabbagh; Parfait Guiagon (6 each)
- Average home league attendance: 8,827
- Biggest win: Thes Sport Tessenderlo 0–3 Charleroi
Home colours	Away colours

The 2023–24 season was Royal Charleroi S.C.'s 120th season in existence and 12th consecutive in the Belgian Pro League. They also competed in the Belgian Cup, being knocked out in the eighth round.

== Players ==
=== First-team squad ===
As of 10 February 2024

Note: Flags indicate national team as defined under FIFA eligibility rules; some limited exceptions apply. Players may hold more than one non-FIFA nationality.

No.	Pos.	Nation	Player
1	GK	FRA	Pierre Patron
2	DF	DEN	Jonas Bager
3	DF	SUI	Stefan Knezevic
4	DF	BEL	Jules Van Cleemput
5	MF	FRA	Etienne Camara
6	MF	ALG	Adem Zorgane
7	MF	BEL	Isaac Mbenza
8	MF	CIV	Parfait Guiagon
9	FW	PLE	Oday Dabbagh
10	FW	SEN	Youssouph Badji
12	GK	BEL	Nicolas Closset
13	FW	ALG	Nadhir Benbouali
15	DF	NOR	Vetle Dragsnes
16	GK	BFA	Hervé Koffi
17	MF	BEL	Antoine Bernier
18	MF	BEL	Daan Heymans

No.	Pos.	Nation	Player
19	FW	SRB	Nikola Štulić
21	DF	CYP	Stelios Andreou
22	MF	FRA	Adrien Trebel
25	DF	FRA	Damien Marcq
26	MF	MAD	Marco Ilaimaharitra (captain)
27	DF	BEL	Roméo Monticelli
29	DF	SLO	Žan Rogelj
32	DF	BEL	Mehdi Boukamir
37	DF	MAR	Achraf Dari (on loan from Brest)
42	MF	BEL	Thomas Lutte
44	MF	JPN	Ryota Morioka
55	GK	BEL	Martin Delavallée
66	DF	NGR	Valentine Ozornwafor
80	FW	BEL	Youssuf Sylla
98	DF	FRA	Jeremy Petris

=== On loan ===
Note: Flags indicate national team as defined under FIFA eligibility rules; some limited exceptions apply. Players may hold more than one non-FIFA nationality.

No.	Pos.	Nation	Player
—	DF	BEL	Martin Wasinski (at Kortrijk until 30 June 2024)
—	MF	BEL	Jackson Tchatchoua (at Hellas Verona until 30 June 2024)

== Transfers ==
=== In ===
Pos.	Player	Transferred from	Fee	Date	Source
FW	(Palestine) Oday Dabbagh	(Portugal) Arouca	Free	1 July 2023	
MF	(Slovenia) Žan Rogelj	(Austria) WSG Tirol	Free	1 July 2023	
MF	(Belgium) Antoine Bernier	(Belgium) RFC Seraing	Free	1 July 2023	
FW	(Senegal) Youssouph Badji	(Belgium) Club Brugge	Undisclosed	6 July 2023	
FW	(Belgium) Youssuf Sylla	(Belgium) Zulte Waregem		30 August 2023	
DF	(Norway) Vetle Dragsnes	(Norway) Lillestrøm	€250,000	31 August 2023	
DF	(Martinique) Jeremy Petris	(Bulgaria) Levski Sofia	Undisclosed	30 January 2024	
DF	(Morocco) Achraf Dari	(France) Brest	Loan	1 February 2024	
MF	(France) Etienne Camara	(Italy) Udinese	Undisclosed	1 February 2024	

=== Out ===
Pos.	Player	Transferred to	Fee	Date	Source
MF	(Iran) Ali Gholizadeh	(Poland) Lech Poznań	€1,800,000	1 July 2023	
MF	(Democratic Republic of the Congo) Joris Kayembe	(Belgium) Genk	Undisclosed	1 July 2023	
MF	(Lithuania) Nauris Petkevičius	(Lithuania) FC Hegelmann	Free	6 July 2023	
GK	(France) Didier Desprez	(Luxembourg) F91 Dudelange	Free	11 July 2023	
FW	(Iran) Amirhossein Hosseinzadeh	(Iran) Tractor	€800,000	25 July 2023	
MF	(France) Julien Maggiotti	(France) Bastia	Undisclosed	26 July 2023	
DF	(Cameroon) Jackson Tchatchoua	(Italy) Hellas Verona	Loan	31 August 2023	
DF	(Togo) Loïc Bessilé	(France) USL Dunkerque	Undisclosed	1 January 2024	
MF	(Belgium) Ken Nkuba	(Belgium) Genk	€3,800,000	30 January 2024	

== Pre-season and friendlies ==
On 8 June 2023, it was announced that their first friendly of the upcoming season, will be a trip to Mons to play fifth division side R.A.E.C. Mons.

25 June 2023 Friendly	Mons (Belgium)	0–1	(Belgium) Charleroi	Mons, Belgium
15:00 UTC+2			Badji 68'	Stadium: Stade Charles Tondreau

1 July 2023 Friendly	Charleroi (Belgium)	5–0	(Belgium) Tournai	Marcinelle, Belgium
15:00 UTC+2	Morioka 43'; Dabbagh 50'; Marcq 60'; Ntelo 70', 75'			Attendance: 0

6 July 2023 Friendly	Oostende (Belgium)	1–3	(Belgium) Charleroi	Ostend, Belgium
15:00 UTC+2	Albanese 15'		Van Cleemput 55'; Štulić 77'; Monticelli 79'	Attendance: 0

8 July 2023 Friendly	Eupen (Belgium)	4–0	(Belgium) Charleroi	Eupen, Belgium
14:00 UTC+2	Davidson 24'; N'Dri 65'; Nuhu 69'; Youndje 73'			Stadium: Kehrwegstadion

12 July 2023 Friendly	Charleroi (Belgium)	2–1	(Croatia) Lokomotiva Zagreb	Burgh-Haamstede, Netherlands
18:30 UTC+2	Marcq 75'; Štulić 90'		Marić 65'

15 July 2023 Friendly	Utrecht (Netherlands)	1–2	(Belgium) Charleroi	Burgh-Haamstede, Netherlands
13:30 UTC+2	Toornstra 29'		Dabbagh 11'; Heymans 37'	Stadium: Sportpark Van Zuyen

19 July 2023 Friendly	Reims (France)	3–1	(Belgium) Charleroi	Bétheny, France
17:00 UTC+2	Diakité 21'; Munetsi 34'; Sekongo 72'		Maggiotti 90' (pen.)	Stadium: Stade Louis Blériot N°1

22 July 2023 Friendly	Charleroi (Belgium)	1–1	(Spain) Rayo Vallecano	Charleroi
19:00 UTC+2	Ilaimaharitra 32' (pen.), (yellow card) 80'		García 6'; Aridane (yellow card) 58'; Montiel (yellow card) 81'; Chavarría (yellow card) 90'	Stadium: Stade du Pays de Charleroi

15 November 2023 Friendly	Charleroi (Belgium)	1–3	(Belgium) Beveren	Charleroi
13:00 UTC+1	Badji 40'		Salech 47'; Kyeremateng 88'	Stadium: jeugdcomplex van Sporting Charleroi
Note: Four periods of 30 minutes.

11 October 2023 Friendly	Francs Borains (Belgium)	0–3	(Belgium) Charleroi	Boussu
11:00				Stadium: Stade Robert Urbain

12 January 2024 Friendly	Charleroi (Belgium)	6–2	(Romania) Dinamo București	Antalya, Turkey
13:00	Guiagon 25'; Štulić 64', 69', 86'; Benbouali 72'; Heymans 90+1'		Gregório 9' (pen.); Abdallah 40'
Note: Two halves of 60 minutes

== Competitions ==
=== Overall record ===
Competition	First match	Last match	Starting round	Final position	Record							
Competition	First match	Last match	Starting round	Final position	Pld	W	D	L	GF	GA	GD	Win %
Belgian Pro League	29 July 2023	17 March 2024	Matchday 1	13th	30	7	8	15	26	48	−22	23.33
Relegation play-offs	6 April 2024	11 May 2024	Matchday 1	1st	6	5	1	0	11	3	+8	83.33
Belgian Cup	31 October 2023	6 December 2023	Seventh round	Eighth round	2	1	0	1	5	5	+0	50.00
Total					38	13	9	16	42	56	−14	34.21

Source: Soccerway

=== Belgian Pro League ===
==== Regular season ====
Pos	Team	Pld	W	D	L	GF	GA	GD	Pts	Qualification or relegation
11	Westerlo	30	7	9	14	42	54	−12	30	Qualification for the Europe play-offs
12	OH Leuven	30	7	8	15	34	47	−13	29	Qualification for the Europe play-offs
13	Charleroi	30	7	8	15	26	48	−22	29	Qualification for the relegation play-offs
14	Eupen	30	7	3	20	24	58	−34	24	Qualification for the relegation play-offs
15	Kortrijk	30	6	6	18	22	57	−35	24	Qualification for the relegation play-offs

Source: Jupiler Pro League (in Dutch), Soccerway
Rules for classification: 1) Points; 2) Matches won; 3) Goal difference; 4) Goals scored; 5) Away matches won; 6) Away goal difference; 7) Away goals scored; 8) Play-off.

==== Results summary ====
Overall								Home						Away					
Pld	W	D	L	GF	GA	GD	Pts	W	D	L	GF	GA	GD	W	D	L	GF	GA	GD
30	7	8	15	26	48	−22	29	6	4	5	20	23	−3	1	4	10	6	25	−19

Source: Worldfootball

==== Results by round ====
Round	1	2	3	4	5	6	7	8	9	10	11	12	13	14	15	16	17	18	19	20	21	22	23	24	25	26	27	28	29	30
Ground	H	A	H	A	A	H	A	H	A	H	H	A	H	A	H	A	H	A	A	H	A	H	H	A	H	A	H	A	H	A
Result	D	L	D	D	L	D	L	W	L	W	W	L	L	L	W	D	L	D	L	W	L	L	W	L	L	D	L	W	D	L
Position	8	14	11	12	12	13	14	14	14	12	9	10	12	13	12	12	12	12	13	12	12	12	12	13	13	13	13	12	12	13

Source: Worldfootball
A = Away; H = Home; W = Win; D = Draw; L = Loss

==== Matches ====
The league fixtures were unveiled on 22 June 2023.

29 July 2023 1	Charleroi	1–1	OH Leuven	Charleroi
18:15	Dabbagh 9'; Štulić (red card) 17'; Mbenza (yellow card) 39'; Ilaimaharitra (yellow card) 52'; Heymans (yellow card) 79'	Report	Maertens (yellow card) 62'; Opoku 84' (pen.)	Stadium: Stade du Pays de Charleroi; Referee: Nathan Verboomen

5 August 2023 2	Cercle Brugge	2–0	Charleroi	Bruges
18:15	Somers 16'; Denkey 43' (pen.)	Report	Knežević (yellow card) 58'; Boukamir (yellow card) 76'; Heymans (yellow card) 80'	Stadium: Jan Breydel Stadium; Referee: Lothar D'hondt

13 August 2023 3	Charleroi	1–1	Standard Liège	Charleroi
18:30		Report		Stadium: Stade du Pays de Charleroi; Referee: Nicolas Laforge

20 August 2023 4	Genk	0–0	Charleroi	Genk
16:00		Report		Stadium: Cegeka Arena; Referee: Kevin Van Damme

27 August 2023 5	Anderlecht	2–1	Charleroi	Brussels
18:30		Report		Stadium: Lotto Park; Referee: Lothar D'Hondt

3 September 2023 6	Charleroi	1–1	Sint-Truiden	Charleroi
19:15		Report		Stadium: Stade du Pays de Charleroi; Referee: Wim Smet

16 September 2023 7	Club Brugge	4–2	Charleroi	Brugge
20:45		Report		Stadium: Jan Breydel Stadium; Referee: Bram Van Driessche

23 September 2023 8	Charleroi	1–0	Kortrijk	Charleroi
16:00		Report		Stadium: Stade du Pays de Charleroi; Referee: Simon Bourdeaud'Hui

1 October 2023 9	Union Saint-Gilloise	3–1	Charleroi	Brussels
13:30		Report		Stadium: Joseph Marien Stadium; Referee: Jasper Vergoote

6 October 2023 10	Charleroi	2–1	RWDM	Charleroi
20:45	Dabbagh 90+3'; Dragsnes (yellow card) 90+6', (goal) 90+11'	Report	Camara (yellow card) 65'; Gueye 82', (yellow card) 90+4' (yellow-red card) 90+6'	Stadium: Stade du Pays de Charleroi; Referee: Lawrence Visser, Theophile Diskeuve
Note: Due to injury the referee Lawrence Visser was replaced at half-time.

21 October 2023 11	Charleroi	3–2	Antwerp	Charleroi
20:45		Report		Stadium: Stade du Pays de Charleroi; Referee: Wesli De Cremer

28 October 2023 12	Eupen	2–0	Charleroi	Eupen
18:15 CEST (UTC+2)	Král 45'; Möhwald 54'	Report		Stadium: Kehrwegstadion; Referee: Jasper Vergoote

5 November 2023 13	Charleroi	1–3	Gent	Charleroi
19:15		Report		Stadium: Stade du Pays de Charleroi; Referee: Jonathan Lardot

11 November 2023 14	Mechelen	1–0	Charleroi	Mechelen
20:45		Report		Stadium: AFAS Stadion; Referee: Wesli De Cremer

25 November 2023 15	Charleroi	3–2	Westerlo	Charleroi
18:15	Heymans 59'; Dabbagh 66'; Sylla 90+6'	Report	Madsen 24'; Yow 90+1'	Stadium: Stade du Pays de Charleroi; Referee: Bram Van Driessche

2 December 2023 16	RWD Molenbeek	0–0	Charleroi	Molenbeek-Saint-Jean
16:00		Report		Stadium: Edmond Machtens Stadium; Referee: Jonathan Lardot

10 December 2023 17	Charleroi	1–3	Union Saint-Gilloise	Charleroi
19:15		Report		Stadium: Stade du Pays de Charleroi; Referee: Erik Lambrechts

16 December 2023 18	Standard Liège	0–0	Charleroi	Liège
20:45		Report		Stadium: Stade Maurice Dufrasne; Referee: Lothar D'Hondt

23 December 2023 19	Sint-Truiden	1–0	Charleroi	Sint-Truiden
18:15		Report		Stadium: Stayen; Referee: Simon Bourdeaud'Hui

27 December 2023 20	Charleroi	3–1	Mechelen	Charleroi
20:45		Report		Stadium: Stade du Pays de Charleroi; Referee: Wesli De Cremer

21 January 2024 21	Antwerp	4–1	Charleroi	Antwerp
13:30		Report		Stadium: Bosuilstadion; Referee: Erik Lambrechts

27 January 2024 22	Charleroi	1–4	Club Brugge	Charleroi
20:45 CET (UTC+1)		Report		Stadium: Stade du Pays de Charleroi; Referee: Bert Put

31 January 2024 23	Charleroi	1–0	Eupen	Charleroi
18:45 CET (UTC+1)		Report		Stadium: Stade du Pays de Charleroi; Referee: Lothar D'hondt

3 February 2024 24	Kortrijk	1–0	Charleroi	Kortrijk
18:15	Davies 45'	Report		Stadium: Guldensporen Stadion; Referee: Brent Staessens

11 February 2024 25	Charleroi	1–3	Anderlecht	Charleroi
18:30	Dari 42'	Report	Van Cleemput 6' (o.g.); Dolberg 29'; Vázquez 85'	Stadium: Stade du Pays de Charleroi; Referee: Erik Lambrechts

17 February 2024 26	OH Leuven	0–0	Charleroi	Leuven
18:15		Report		Stadium: Den Dreef; Referee: Nicolas Laforge

23 February 2024 27	Charleroi	0–1	Genk	Charleroi
20:45		Report	Sor 71'	Stadium: Stade du Pays de Charleroi; Referee: Kevin Van Damme

1 March 2024 28	Westerlo	0–1	Charleroi	Westerlo
20:45		Report	Guiagon 65'	Stadium: Het Kuipje; Referee: Bram Van Driessche

9 March 2024 29	Charleroi	0–0	Cercle Brugge	Charleroi
18:15	Ilaimaharitra (penalty missed) 61'	Report	Popović (red card) 40'	Stadium: Stade du Pays de Charleroi; Referee: Lothar D'hondt

17 March 2024 30	Gent	5–0	Charleroi	Ghent
18:30	Fernandez-Pardo 38'; Gandelman 41', 48', 55', 67'	Report		Stadium: Ghelamco Arena; Referee: Jan Boterberg

==== Results summary ====
Overall								Home						Away					
Pld	W	D	L	GF	GA	GD	Pts	W	D	L	GF	GA	GD	W	D	L	GF	GA	GD
6	5	1	0	11	4	+7	16	2	1	0	4	1	+3	3	0	0	7	3	+4

Last updated: 11 May 2024.

==== Results by round ====
Round	1	2	3	4	5	6
Ground	H	A	H	A	A	H
Result	D	W	W	W	W	W
Position	1	1	1	1	1	1

Updated to match(es) played on 11 May 2024. Source:
A = Away; H = Home; W = Win; D = Draw; L = Loss

==== Matches ====
6 April 2024 1	Charleroi	0–0	RWDM	Charleroi
16:00	Guiagon (yellow card) 20'	Report	Biron (yellow card) 17', (penalty missed) 56'; Abner (yellow card) 45+2'; Dwomoh (yellow card) 67'; Makosso (yellow card) 78'	Stadium: Stade du Pays de Charleroi; Attendance: 7,035; Referee: Wesli De Cremer

14 April 2024 2	Kortrijk	1–2	Charleroi	Kortrijk
16:00	Davies 45+2'	Report	Camara (yellow card) 32'; Bernier 54'; Dari 90+4'	Stadium: Guldensporen Stadion; Attendance: 6,691; Referee: Nicolas Laforge

21 April 2024 3	Charleroi	1–0	Eupen	Charleroi
19:15	Heymans 14'; Bager (yellow card) 90+2'	Report	Nuhu (yellow card) 18'	Stadium: Stade du Pays de Charleroi; Attendance: 7,333; Referee: Wim Smet

26 April 2024 4	Eupen	1–2	Charleroi	Eupen
20:45	Baiye (yellow card) 33'; Białek 86'; Král (yellow card) 89'	Report	Bernier 11'; Dabbagh 41'; Camara (yellow card) 56'	Stadium: Kehrwegstadion; Referee: Bert Put

4 May 2024 5	RWDM	1–3	Charleroi	Molenbeek-Saint-Jean
16:00	Gueye 63'	Report	Dari 7'; Dragsnes 35'; Guiagon 39'; Andreou (yellow card) 87'	Stadium: Edmond Machtens Stadium; Referee: Kevin van Damme

11 May 2024 6	Charleroi	3–1	Kortrijk	Charleroi
18:15	Heymans 24' (pen.); Bernier 38'; Sylla 70'	Report	Davies 58'; Kadri (yellow card) 90+2'	Stadium: Stade du Pays de Charleroi; Referee: Wim Smet

=== Belgian Cup ===
31 October 2023 Seventh round	Thes Sport Tessenderlo	0–3	Charleroi	Tessenderlo
20:30 CET (UTC+1)		Report	Badji 38'; Rogelj 55'; Heymans 57'	Stadium: Gemeentelijk Sportpark Tessenderlo; Referee: Jordy Vermeire

6 December 2023 Eighth round	Antwerp	5–2	Charleroi	Antwerp
20:30 CET (UTC+1)	Ejuke 45'; Boukamir 57' (o.g.); Janssen 71', 90+2'; Ilenikhena 76'	Report	Dabbagh 28'; Heymans 31'; Ilaimaharitra (penalty missed) 90'	Stadium: Bosuilstadion; Referee: Jan Boterberg
