= List of French football transfers summer 2024 =

This is a list of French football transfers for the 2024 summer transfer window. Only transfers featuring Ligue 1 and Ligue 2 are listed.

== Ligue 1 ==
Note: Flags indicate national team as has been defined under FIFA eligibility rules. Players may hold more than one non-FIFA nationality.

=== Paris Saint-Germain ===
In:

No.	Pos.	Nation	Player
14	MF	FRA	Désiré Doué (from Rennes)
39	GK	RUS	Matvei Safonov (from (Russia) Krasnodar)
51	DF	ECU	Willian Pacho (from (Germany) Eintracht Frankfurt)
87	MF	POR	João Neves (from (Portugal) Benfica)

Out:

No.	Pos.	Nation	Player
1	GK	CRC	Keylor Navas (released)
4	MF	URU	Manuel Ugarte (to (England) Manchester United)
7	FW	FRA	Kylian Mbappé (to (Spain) Real Madrid)
16	GK	ESP	Sergio Rico (released)
26	DF	FRA	Nordi Mukiele (on loan to (Germany) Bayer Leverkusen)
38	MF	FRA	Ethan Mbappé (to Lille)
90	GK	FRA	Alexandre Letellier (released)
97	DF	FRA	Layvin Kurzawa (released)
—	MF	FRA	Édouard Michut (to (Turkey) Adana Demirspor, previously on loan)
—	FW	FRA	Hugo Ekitike (to (Germany) Eintracht Frankfurt, previously on loan)
—	MF	GAB	Noha Lemina (to Annecy, previously on loan at (England) Wolverhampton Wanderers)
—	MF	NED	Xavi Simons (on loan extended to (Germany) RB Leipzig)
—	MF	POR	Renato Sanches (on loan to (Portugal) Benfica, previously on loan at (Italy) Roma)
—	MF	ITA	Cher Ndour (on loan to (Turkey) Beşiktaş, previously on loan at (Portugal) Braga)
—	MF	BRA	Gabriel Moscardo (on loan to Reims, previously on loan at (Brazil) Corinthians)
—	GK	FRA	Lucas Lavallée (on loan to Aubagne, previously on loan at Dunkerque)
—	DF	ESP	Juan Bernat (on loan to (Spain) Villarreal, previously on loan at (Portugal) Benfica)

=== Monaco ===
In:

No.	Pos.	Nation	Player
4	DF	NED	Jordan Teze (from (Netherlands) PSV)
5	DF	GER	Thilo Kehrer (from (England) West Ham United, previously on loan)
13	DF	FRA	Christian Mawissa (from Toulouse)
15	MF	SEN	Lamine Camara (from Metz)
21	FW	FRA	George Ilenikhena (from (Belgium) Royal Antwerp)
—	FW	GER	Paris Brunner (from (Germany) Borussia Dortmund II)

Out:

No.	Pos.	Nation	Player
3	DF	CHI	Guillermo Maripán (to (Italy) Torino)
4	MF	MLI	Mohamed Camara (to (Qatar) Al Sadd)
10	FW	FRA	Wissam Ben Yedder (released)
19	MF	FRA	Youssouf Fofana (to (Italy) Milan)
—	FW	NED	Myron Boadu (on loan to (Germany) Vfl Bochum, previously on loan at (Netherlands) Twente)
—	MF	FRA	Félix Lemaréchal (to Strasbourg, previously on loan at (Belgium) Cercle Brugge)
—	FW	GER	Paris Brunner (on loan to (Belgium) Cercle Brugge)

=== Brest ===
In:

No.	Pos.	Nation	Player
3	DF	SEN	Abdoulaye Ndiaye (on loan from Troyes)
17	FW	SEN	Abdallah Sima (on loan from (England) Brighton & Hove Albion)
19	FW	FRA	Ludovic Ajorque (on loan from (Germany) 1. FSV Mainz 05)
21	MF	FRA	Romain Faivre (on loan from (England) Bournemouth)
23	DF	FRA	Jordan Amavi (from Marseille, previously on loan)
25	DF	FRA	Julien Le Cardinal (from Lens, previously on loan)
34	FW	MAR	Ibrahim Salah (on loan from Rennes)
44	DF	FRA	Soumaila Coulibaly (on loan from (Germany) Borussia Dortmund)

Out:

No.	Pos.	Nation	Player
3	DF	FRA	Lilian Brassier (on loan to Marseille)
7	FW	URU	Martín Satriano (loan return to (Italy) Inter Milan, later on loan to Lens)
9	FW	BEN	Steve Mounié (to (Germany) FC Augsburg)
14	FW	FRA	Adrien Lebeau (to (Germany) Hansa Rostock)
16	GK	FRA	Yan Marillat (released)
22	FW	FRA	Jérémy Le Douaron (to (Italy) Palermo)
—	FW	GLP	Taïryk Arconte (to Pau, previously on loan at Rodez)
—	MF	ENG	Karamoko Dembélé (on loan to (England) QPR, previously on loan at (England) Blackpool)
—	DF	FRA	Josué Escartin (to Red Star, previously on loan at Ajaccio)
—	DF	MAR	Achraf Dari (to (Egypt) Al Ahly SC, previously on loan at (Belgium) Charleroi)

=== Lille ===
In:

No.	Pos.	Nation	Player
2	DF	ALG	Aïssa Mandi (from (Spain) Villarreal)
11	FW	NOR	Osame Sahraoui (from (Netherlands) Heereenveen)
12	DF	BEL	Thomas Meunier (from (Turkey) Trabzonspor)
17	MF	COD	Ngal'ayel Mukau (from (Belgium) Mechelen)
29	MF	FRA	Ethan Mbappé (from Paris Saint-Germain)

Out:

No.	Pos.	Nation	Player
11	MF	ALG	Adam Ounas (released)
12	MF	TUR	Yusuf Yazıcı (released)
15	DF	FRA	Leny Yoro (to (England) Manchester United)
16	GK	SVK	Adam Jakubech (released)
17	FW	POR	Ivan Cavaleiro (released)
19	FW	POR	Tiago Morais (on loan to (Portugal) Rio Ave)
20	MF	ARG	Ignacio Miramón (on loan to (Argentina) Boca Juniors)
—	FW	FRA	Alan Virginius (on loan to (Switzerland) Young Boys, previously on loan at Clermont)

=== Nice ===
In:

No.	Pos.	Nation	Player
5	DF	EGY	Mohamed Abdelmonem (from (Egypt) Al Ahly)
11	MF	FRA	Morgan Sanson (from (England) Aston Villa, previously on loan)
15	FW	GER	Youssoufa Moukoko (on loan from (Germany) Borussia Dortmund)
22	MF	FRA	Tanguy Ndombele (from (England) Tottenham Hotspur)
64	DF	CAN	Moïse Bombito (from (United States) Colorado Rapids)
92	DF	FRA	Jonathan Clauss (from Marseille)

Out:

No.	Pos.	Nation	Player
2	DF	FRA	Valentin Rosier (loan return to (Turkey) Beşiktaş, later to (Spain) Leganés)
6	DF	FRA	Jean-Clair Todibo (on loan to (England) West Ham United)
15	DF	FRA	Romain Perraud (loan return to (England) Southampton, later to (Spain) Real Betis)
18	FW	FRA	Alexis Claude-Maurice (released)
19	MF	FRA	Khéphren Thuram (to (Italy) Juventus)
21	MF	FRA	Alexis Beka Beka (released)
27	FW	GUI	Aliou Baldé (on loan to (Germany) VfL Bochum)
—	DF	BRA	Robson Bambu (to (Portugal) Braga, previously on loan at (Portugal) Arouca)
—	DF	ITA	Mattia Viti (on loan to (Italy) Empoli, previously on loan at (Italy) Sassuolo)
—	DF	MAR	Ayoub Amraoui (on loan to Martigues, previously on loan at Amiens)

=== Lyon ===
In:

No.	Pos.	Nation	Player
7	FW	GNB	Mama Baldé (from Troyes, previously on loan)
15	MF	USA	Tanner Tessmann (from (Italy) Venezia)
16	DF	BRA	Abner (from (Spain) Real Betis)
17	FW	ALG	Saïd Benrahma (from (England) West Ham United, previously on loan)
19	DF	SEN	Moussa Niakhaté (from (England) Nottingham Forest)
25	MF	BEL	Orel Mangala (from (England) Nottingham Forest, previously on loan)
37	FW	GHA	Ernest Nuamah (from (Belgium) Molenbeek, previously on loan)
40	GK	FRA	Rémy Descamps (from Nantes)
55	DF	CRO	Duje Ćaleta-Car (from (England) Southampton, previously on loan)
69	FW	GEO	Georges Mikautadze (from Metz)

Out:

No.	Pos.	Nation	Player
12	DF	IRL	Jake O'Brien (to (England) Everton)
21	DF	BRA	Henrique (released)
24	MF	FRA	Johann Lepenant (on loan to Nantes)
84	MF	FRA	Mohamed El Arouch (to (Brazil) Botafogo)
—	FW	ZIM	Tino Kadewere (to Nantes, previously on loan)
—	GK	FRA	Mathieu Patouillet (on loan extended to Sochaux)
—	MF	FRA	Skelly Alvero (to (Germany) Werder Bremen, previously on loan)
—	DF	FRA	Mamadou Sarr (to Strasbourg, previously on loan at (Belgium) Molenbeek)
—	DF	MAR	Achraf Laâziri (on loan to (Belgium) Molenbeek, previously on loan at Dunkerque)
—	MF	FRA	Islamdine Halifa (on loan to (Belgium) Molenbeek)
—	FW	SWE	Amin Sarr (on loan to (Italy) Hellas Verona, previously on loan at (Germany) VfL Wolfsburg)

=== Lens ===
In:

No.	Pos.	Nation	Player
1	GK	SVN	Denis Petrić (from Nantes)
8	FW	ANG	M'Bala Nzola (on loan from (Italy) Fiorentina)
9	FW	URU	Martín Satriano (on loan from (Italy) Inter Milan)
13	DF	ECU	Jhoanner Chávez (from (Brazil) Bahia, previously on loan)
16	GK	BFA	Hervé Koffi (from (Belgium) Charleroi)
20	DF	FRA	Malang Sarr (from (England) Chelsea)
38	FW	MAR	Anass Zaroury (from (England) Burnley)

Out:

No.	Pos.	Nation	Player
9	FW	FRA	Elye Wahi (to Marseille)
16	GK	FRA	Jean-Louis Leca (retired)
27	FW	GUI	Morgan Guilavogui (on loan to (Germany) FC St. Pauli)
36	FW	FRA	Ibrahima Baldé (to Rodez)
40	GK	COM	Yannick Pandor (on loan to Boulogne)
—	DF	FRA	Julien Le Cardinal (to Brest, previously on loan)
—	MF	COL	Óscar Cortés (on loan extended to (Scotland) Rangers)
—	MF	POL	Łukasz Poręba (to (Germany) Hamburger SV, previously on loan)
—	FW	POL	Adam Buksa (to (Denmark) Midtjylland, previously on loan at (Turkey) Antalyaspor)
—	MF	NED	Stijn Spierings (to (Denmark) Brøndby IF, previously on loan at Toulouse FC)

=== Marseille ===
In:

No.	Pos.	Nation	Player
1	GK	ARG	Gerónimo Rulli (from (Netherlands) Ajax)
7	MF	ARG	Valentín Carboni (on loan from (Italy) Inter Milan)
9	FW	FRA	Elye Wahi (from Lens)
10	FW	ENG	Mason Greenwood (from (England) Manchester United)
12	GK	NED	Jeffrey de Lange (from (Netherlands) Go Ahead Eagles)
13	DF	CAN	Derek Cornelius (from (Sweden) Malmö)
17	FW	ENG	Jonathan Rowe (on loan from (England) Norwich City)
18	DF	CIV	Bamo Meïté (from Lorient, previously on loan)
20	DF	FRA	Lilian Brassier (on loan from Brest)
23	MF	DEN	Pierre-Emile Højbjerg (on loan from (England) Tottenham Hotspur)
32	FW	FRA	Neal Maupay (on loan from (England) Everton)
51	MF	CAN	Ismaël Koné (from (England) Watford)

Out:

No.	Pos.	Nation	Player
1	GK	CMR	Simon Ngapandouetnbu (on loan to Nîmes)
7	DF	FRA	Jonathan Clauss (to Nice)
10	FW	GAB	Pierre-Emerick Aubameyang (to (Saudi Arabia) Al Qadsiah)
16	GK	ESP	Pau López (on loan to (Spain) Girona)
20	FW	ARG	Joaquin Correa (loan return to (Italy) Inter Milan)
22	MF	SEN	Pape Gueye (to (Spain) Villarreal)
23	FW	SEN	Ismaïla Sarr (to (England) Crystal Palace)
29	MF	SEN	Iliman Ndiaye (to (England) Everton)
—	MF	FRA	Mattéo Guendouzi (to (Italy) Lazio, previously on loan)
—	FW	POR	Vitinha (to (Italy) Genoa, previously on loan)
—	FW	USA	Konrad de la Fuente (to (Switzerland) Lausanne, previously on loan at (Spain) Eibar)
—	DF	FRA	Jordan Amavi (to Brest, previously on loan)

=== Reims ===
In:

No.	Pos.	Nation	Player
13	DF	POR	Aurélio Buta (on loan from (Germany) Eintracht Frankfurt)
19	MF	BRA	Gabriel Moscardo (on loan from Paris Saint-Germain)
21	DF	CIV	Cédric Kipré (from (England) West Bromwich Albion)

Out:

No.	Pos.	Nation	Player
5	DF	MAR	Yunis Abdelhamid (to Saint-Étienne)
8	MF	MAR	Amir Richardson (to (Italy) Fiorentina)
32	DF	BEL	Thomas Foket (to (Belgium) Anderlecht)
—	DF	FRA	Thérence Koudou (to Pau, previously on loan)
—	DF	GUI	Ibrahim Diakité (to (Belgium) Cercle Brugge, previously on loan at (Switzerland) SLO)
—	DF	FRA	Cheick Keita (to (Belgium) Charleroi, previously on loan at Bastia)
—	GK	FRA	Ewen Jaouen (on loan to Dunkerque)

=== Rennes ===
In:

No.	Pos.	Nation	Player
7	MF	DEN	Albert Grønbæk (from (Norway) Bodø/Glimt)
13	DF	MAR	Mohamed Jaouab (from Amiens)
15	DF	NED	Hans Hateboer (from (Italy) Atalanta)
17	MF	WAL	Jordan James (from (England) Birmingham City)
19	FW	DEN	Henrik Meister (from (Norway) Sarpsborg)
20	FW	COL	Andrés Gómez (from (United States) Real Salt Lake)
28	MF	FIN	Glen Kamara (from (England) Leeds United)
33	DF	SEN	Mikayil Faye (from (Spain) Barcelona)
55	DF	NOR	Leo Østigård (from (Italy) Napoli)

Out:

No.	Pos.	Nation	Player
5	DF	BEL	Arthur Theate (on loan to (Germany) Eintracht Frankfurt)
7	FW	FRA	Martin Terrier (to (Germany) Bayer Leverkusen)
14	MF	FRA	Benjamin Bourigeaud (to (Qatar) Al-Duhail)
16	DF	FRA	Jeanuël Belocian (to (Germany) Bayer Leverkusen)
17	DF	CIV	Guéla Doué (to Strasbourg)
28	MF	FRA	Enzo Le Fée (to (Italy) Roma)
32	MF	SUI	Fabian Rieder (on loan to (Germany) VfB Stuttgart)
33	MF	FRA	Désiré Doué (to Paris Saint-Germain)
34	FW	MAR	Ibrahim Salah (on loan to Brest)
39	FW	FRA	Mathis Lambourde (to (Italy) Hellas Verona)
99	FW	TUR	Bertuğ Yıldırım (on loan to (Spain) Getafe)
—	GK	SEN	Alfred Gomis (to (Italy) Palermo, previously on loan at Lorient)
—	FW	FRA	Matthis Abline (to Nantes, previously on loan)

=== Toulouse ===
In:

No.	Pos.	Nation	Player

Out:

No.	Pos.	Nation	Player
3	DF	DEN	Mikkel Desler (to (United States) Austin)
—	DF	FRA	Anthony Rouault (to (Germany) VfB Stuttgart, previously on loan)
—	MF	SRB	Veljko Birmančević (to (Czech Republic) Sparta Prague, previously on loan)
—	FW	MAR	Yanis Begraoui (to (Portugal) Estoril, previously on loan at Pau)

=== Montpellier ===
In:

No.	Pos.	Nation	Player
19	MF	FRA	Rabby Nzingoula (on loan from Strasbourg)
20	MF	MLI	Birama Touré (from (Saudi Arabia) Al-Riyadh)
52	DF	SRB	Nikola Maksimović (from (Turkey) Hatayspor)

Out:

No.	Pos.	Nation	Player
18	MF	FRA	Léo Leroy (to (Switzerland) Basel)
—	MF	FRA	Maxime Estève (to (England) Burnley)
—	MF	FRA	Sacha Delaye (to Austria Lustenau)

=== Strasbourg ===
In:

No.	Pos.	Nation	Player
20	FW	COL	Oscar Perea (from (Colombia) Atlético Nacional)

Out:

No.	Pos.	Nation	Player
6	MF	CIV	Jean-Eudes Aholou (to Angers)
27	MF	MLI	Ibrahima Sissoko (to (Germany) VfL Bochum)
30	GK	HAI	Alexandre Pierre (to Sochaux)

=== Nantes ===
In:

No.	Pos.	Nation	Player
39	FW	FRA	Matthis Abline (from Rennes, previously on loan)

Out:

No.	Pos.	Nation	Player
—	MF	FRA	Lohann Doucet (to Paris FC, previously on loan)

=== Le Havre ===
In:

No.	Pos.	Nation	Player
44	MF	FRA	Ismail Bouneb (from Valenciennes)

Out:

No.	Pos.	Nation	Player
—	GK	CIV	Mohamed Koné (to (Belgium) Charleroi, previously on loan at Dunkerque)
—	DF	FRA	Djamal Moussadek (to Versailles, previously on loan at Villefranche)

=== Auxerre ===
In:

No.	Pos.	Nation	Player
21	MF	CIV	Lasso Coulibaly (from (Denmark) Nordsjælland, previously on loan at (Denmark) Randers)

Out:

No.	Pos.	Nation	Player
—	DF	FRA	Brayann Pereira (to (Netherlands) NEC, previously on loan)

=== Angers ===
In:

No.	Pos.	Nation	Player
—	MF	CIV	Jean-Eudes Aholou (from Strasbourg)
—	FW	GAB	Jim Allevinah (from Clermont)
—	DF	HAI	Carlens Arcus (from (Netherlands) Vitesse)

Out:

No.	Pos.	Nation	Player
2	DF	TUN	Yan Valery (to (England) Sheffield Wednesday)
—	FW	CRO	Marin Jakoliš (to (Australia) Macarthur, previously on loan at (Australia) Melbourne City)

=== Saint-Étienne ===
In:

No.	Pos.	Nation	Player

Out:

No.	Pos.	Nation	Player
14	MF	FRA	Dylan Chambost (to (United States) Columbus Crew)
20	MF	FRA	Maxence Rivera (to Dunkerque)

== Ligue 2 ==
Note: Flags indicate national team as has been defined under FIFA eligibility rules. Players may hold more than one non-FIFA nationality.

=== Metz ===
In:

No.	Pos.	Nation	Player

Out:

No.	Pos.	Nation	Player
1	GK	FRA	Guillaume Dietsch (to (Belgium) Dender EH)
10	FW	GEO	Georges Mikautadze (to Lyon)
11	FW	CMR	Didier Lamkel Zé (loan return to (Turkey) Hatayspor)
—	DF	MAR	Sofiane Alakouch (to Paris FC, previously on loan)
—	MF	FRA	Maïdine Douane (to Clermont)
—	MF	BEL	Sami Lahssaini (to (Belgium) RAAL La Louvière, previously on loan)
—	FW	MTN	Pape Ndiaga Yade (to (Moldova) Sheriff Tiraspol, previously on loan at Quevilly-Rouen)

=== Lorient ===
In:

No.	Pos.	Nation	Player
32	DF	GHA	Nathaniel Adjei (from (Sweden) Hammarby, previously on loan)

Out:

No.	Pos.	Nation	Player
—	DF	CIV	Bamo Meïté (to Marseille, previously on loan)

=== Clermont ===
In:

No.	Pos.	Nation	Player
11	MF	FRA	Maïdine Douane (from Metz)

Out:

No.	Pos.	Nation	Player
11	FW	GAB	Jim Allevinah (to Angers)

=== Rodez ===
In:

No.	Pos.	Nation	Player
22	FW	FRA	Ibrahima Baldé (from Lens)

Out:

No.	Pos.	Nation	Player

=== Paris FC ===
In:

No.	Pos.	Nation	Player
18	MF	FRA	Lohann Doucet (from Nantes, previously on loan)
22	DF	MAR	Sofiane Alakouch (from Metz, previously on loan)

Out:

No.	Pos.	Nation	Player

=== Caen ===
In:

No.	Pos.	Nation	Player

Out:

No.	Pos.	Nation	Player

=== Laval ===
In:

No.	Pos.	Nation	Player

Out:

No.	Pos.	Nation	Player

=== Amiens ===
In:

No.	Pos.	Nation	Player

Out:

No.	Pos.	Nation	Player
13	DF	MAR	Mohamed Jaouab (to Rennes)

=== Guingamp ===
In:

No.	Pos.	Nation	Player

Out:

No.	Pos.	Nation	Player

=== Pau ===
In:

No.	Pos.	Nation	Player

Out:

No.	Pos.	Nation	Player
9	FW	MAR	Yanis Begraoui (loan return to Toulouse)

=== Grenoble ===
In:

No.	Pos.	Nation	Player

Out:

No.	Pos.	Nation	Player

=== Bordeaux ===
In:

No.	Pos.	Nation	Player

Out:

No.	Pos.	Nation	Player

=== Bastia ===
In:

No.	Pos.	Nation	Player

Out:

No.	Pos.	Nation	Player

=== Annecy ===
In:

No.	Pos.	Nation	Player

Out:

No.	Pos.	Nation	Player

=== Dunkerque ===
In:

No.	Pos.	Nation	Player
—	MF	FRA	Maxence Rivera (from Saint-Étienne)

Out:

No.	Pos.	Nation	Player
30	GK	CIV	Mohamed Koné (loan return to Le Havre)

=== Red Star ===
In:

No.	Pos.	Nation	Player

Out:

No.	Pos.	Nation	Player

=== Martigues ===
In:

No.	Pos.	Nation	Player

Out:

No.	Pos.	Nation	Player

=== Troyes ===
In:

No.	Pos.	Nation	Player

Out:

No.	Pos.	Nation	Player
—	FW	GNB	Mama Baldé (to Lyon, previously on loan)
—	FW	BRA	Sávio (to (England) Manchester City, previously on loan at (Spain) Girona)

== See also ==
- 2024–25 Ligue 1
- 2024–25 Ligue 2
