= Cheick Keita =

Cheick Keita is a name. People with that name include

- Cheick Keita (footballer, born 1996), Malian football left-back for Termoli
- Cheick Keita (footballer, born 2003), Malian football centre-back for Charleroi
