= Nikola Štulić =

Serbian footballer

Personal information
- Date of birth: 8 September 2001 (age 25)
- Place of birth: Sremska Mitrovica, FR Yugoslavia
- Height: 1.88 m (6 ft 2 in)
- Position: Forward

Team information
- Current team: Lecce
- Number: 9

Youth career
- 2015–2020: Partizan

Senior career*
Years	Team	Apps	(Gls)
2020–2021	Partizan	22	(1)
2022	Radnički Niš	32	(10)
2023–2025	Charleroi	55	(18)
2025–	Lecce	42	(4)

International career^{‡}
2021	Serbia U21	2	(0)
2023–	Serbia	4	(0)
- * Club domestic league appearances and goals as of 4 November 2026 ‡ National team caps and goals as of 5 June 2026

Nikola Štulić (Serbian Cyrillic: Никола Штулић; born 8 September 2001) is a Serbian professional footballer who plays as a forward for Serie A club Lecce and the Serbia national team.

== Club career ==
=== Partizan ===
A graduate of Partizan's youth academy, Štulić made his professional debut for the club on 14 June 2020, coming on as a 69th-minute substitute for Bojan Matić in a 4–1 victory over Čukarički. In July of that year, he signed his first professional contract with the club; a four-year deal.

=== Charleroi ===
On 31 January 2023, Štulić signed a contract with Belgian side Charleroi until June 2026 for an estimated fee of around €750,000.

== Career statistics ==
=== Club ===
As of match played 17 May 2026

Appearances and goals by club, season and competition
Club	Season	League			Cup		Continental		Other		Total	
Club	Season	Division	Apps	Goals	Apps	Goals	Apps	Goals	Apps	Goals	Apps	Goals
Partizan	2019–20	Serbian SuperLiga	2	0	0	0	0	0	—		2	0
Partizan	2020–21	Serbian SuperLiga	19	1	4	0	0	0	—		23	1
Partizan	2021–22	Serbian SuperLiga	1	0	0	0	0	0	—		1	0
Partizan	Total		22	1	4	0	0	0	—		26	1
Radnički Niš	2021–22	Serbian SuperLiga	13	0	1	0	—		—		14	0
Radnički Niš	2022–23	Serbian SuperLiga	19	10	2	1	2	1	—		23	12
Radnički Niš	Total		32	10	3	1	2	1	—		37	12
Charleroi	2022–23	Belgian Pro League	8	0	0	0	—		—		8	0
Charleroi	2023–24	Belgian Pro League	16	1	0	0	—		—		16	1
Charleroi	2024–25	Belgian Pro League	28	16	0	0	—		1	0	29	16
Charleroi	2025–26	Belgian Pro League	3	1	0	0	2	1	0	0	5	2
Charleroi	Total		55	18	0	0	2	1	1	0	58	19
Lecce	2025–26	Serie A	34	4	0	0	—		—		34	4
Career total			143	33	7	1	4	2	1	0	155	36

=== International ===
As of 5 June 2026

Serbia
Year	Apps	Goals
2023	1	0
2025	1	0
2026	2	0
Total	4	0

== Honours ==
Individual

- Serbian SuperLiga Player of the Week: 2022–23 Round 5, Round 7,
- Serbian SuperLiga Player of the Month: August 2022
