= Jeremy Petris =

Martiniquais footballer (born 1998)

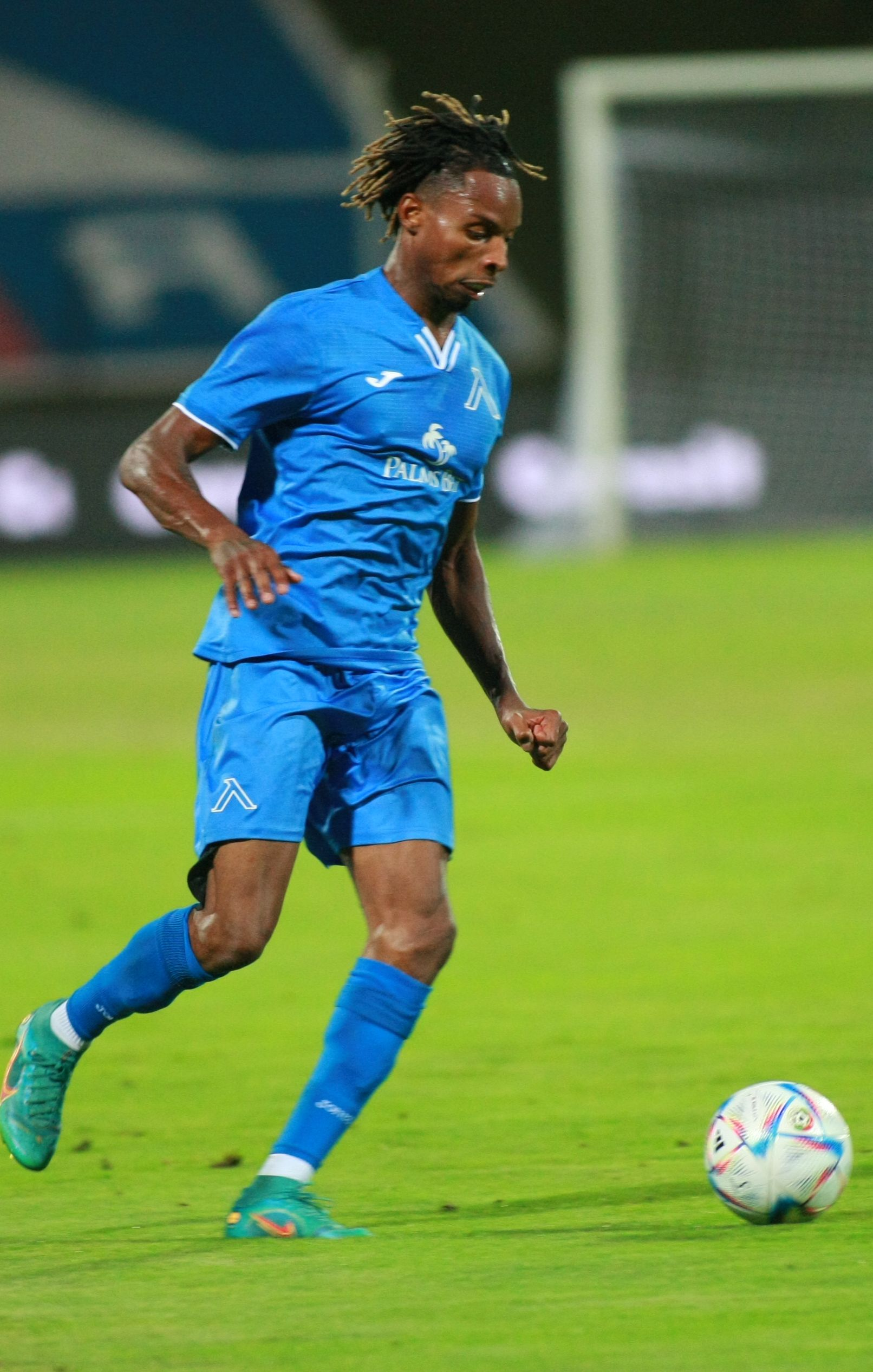
- Petris with Levski Sofia in 2022

Personal information
- Full name: Jeremy Arnaud Petris
- Date of birth: 28 January 1998 (age 28)
- Place of birth: Bagnolet, France
- Height: 1.83 m (6 ft 0 in)
- Position: Right-back

Team information
- Current team: Aris
- Number: 2

Youth career
- –2017: Paris FC

Senior career*
Years	Team	Apps	(Gls)
2016–2017	Paris FC II	7	(0)
2017–2019	Gozzano	45	(1)
2019–2022	Crotone	0	(0)
2019	→ Gozzano (loan)	8	(0)
2020	→ Bisceglie (loan)	9	(0)
2020–2021	→ Pro Vercelli (loan)	9	(0)
2022	Tsarsko Selo	10	(0)
2022–2024	Levski Sofia	43	(1)
2024–2025	Charleroi	54	(0)
2025–2026	Watford	12	(0)
2026–	Aris	6	(1)
- * Club domestic league appearances and goals as of 26 October 2026

Jeremy Arnaud Petris (born 28 January 1998) is a French professional footballer who plays as a right-back for Super League Greece club Aris.

== Club career ==
=== Gozzano ===
After two years with Paris FC II, Petris joined Italian side Gozzano in July 2017. He made his professional debut for the club on 27 August with a 3–0 cup win over Borgosesia. He scored his first league goal against Carrarese on 12 December 2018.

=== Crotone ===
Petris moved to Crotone in Serie B on 30 January 2019 and remained on loan with Gozzano until the end of the season.

=== Bisceglie (loan) ===
In January 2020, Petris went on loan to Bisceglie in Serie C. He debuted against Rende on 22 January.

=== Pro Vercelli (loan) ===
In September 2020, he again went on loan to Pro Vercelli in Serie C. He played his first match on 4 October in a league draw with Pro Patria.

=== Tsarsko Selo ===
In February 2022, Petris transferred permanently to Bulgarian First League club Tsarsko Selo for free. He made his league debut on 20 February against Beroe.

=== Levski Sofia ===
On 14 July 2022, he moved to Levski Sofia on a free transfer. He made his league debut on 16 July against Spartak Varna. He made his European debut on 21 July against PAOK in a UEFA Conference League qualifying match.

=== Charleroi ===
On 30 January 2024, Petris signed a contract with Charleroi in Belgium for three seasons, with an option for two more.

=== Watford ===
On 1 September 2025, Petris officially signed for EFL Championship club Watford, for an undisclosed fee. He has signed a four-year contract.

== International career ==
In March 2023, Petris received his first call-up for Martinique for the Nations League match against Costa Rica on 25 March.

== Career statistics ==
=== Club ===
As of match played 3 February 2026

Club	Season	League			National Cup (Note: Includes Bulgarian Supercup)		League cup		Other (Note: Includes UEFA Conference League)		Total	
Club	Season	Division	Apps	Goals	Apps	Goals	Apps	Goals	Apps	Goals	Apps	Goals
Paris FC II	2015–16	CFA 2	3	0	–		–		0	0	3	0
Paris FC II	2016–17	CFA 2	4	0	–		–		0	0	4	0
Paris FC II	Total		7	0	0	0	0	0	0	0	7	0
Gozzano	2017–18	Serie D	33	0	0	0	2 (Note: Appearances in the Coppa Italia Serie D)	0	1 (Note: Appearances in the Scudetto Serie D)	0	36	0
Gozzano	2018–19	Serie C	12	1	0	0	2 (Note: Appearances in the Coppa Italia Serie C)	0	0	0	14	1
Gozzano	Total		45	1	0	0	4	0	1	0	50	1
Crotone	2018–19	Serie B	0	0	0	0	–		0	0	0	0
Crotone	2019–20	Serie B	0	0	0	0	–		0	0	0	0
Crotone	2020–21	Serie A	0	0	0	0	–		0	0	0	0
Crotone	2021–22	Serie B	0	0	0	0	–		0	0	0	0
Crotone	Total		0	0	0	0	0	0	0	0	0	0
Gozzano (loan)	2018–19	Serie C	8	0	0	0	0	0	0	0	8	0
Bisceglie (loan)	2019–20	Serie C	9	0	0	0	0	0	2 (Note: Appearances in the Relegation play-outs)	0	11	0
Pro Vercelli (loan)	2020–21	Serie C	9	0	0	0	0	0	0	0	9	0
Tsarsko Selo	2021–22	First League	10	0	0	0	–		–		10	0
Levski Sofia	2022–23	First League	26	1	1	0	–		4	0	31	1
Levski Sofia	2023–24	First League	4	0	0	0	–		2	0	6	0
Levski Sofia	Total		30	1	1	0	0	0	6	0	37	1
Charleroi	2023–24	Belgian Pro League	12	0	–		–		–		12	0
Charleroi	2024–25	Belgian Pro League	37	0	0	0	–		–		37	0
Charleroi	2025–26	Belgian Pro League	5	0	0	0	–		2	0	7	0
Charleroi	Total		54	0	0	0	–		2	0	56	0
Watford	2025–26	EFL Championship	17	0	1	0	0	0	—		18	0
Career total			189	2	2	0	4	0	11	0	206	2
