= Etienne Camara =

French footballer (born 2003)

Personal information
- Full name: Etienne Amara Camara
- Date of birth: 30 March 2003 (age 23)
- Place of birth: Noisy-le-Grand, France
- Height: 1.91 m (6 ft 3 in)
- Position: Midfielder

Team information
- Current team: Panathinaikos
- Number: 22

Youth career
- 2009–2018: US Torcy
- 2018–2020: Angers
- 2020–2021: Huddersfield Town

Senior career*
Years	Team	Apps	(Gls)
2021–2023	Huddersfield Town	20	(0)
2023–2024	Udinese	1	(0)
2024–2026	Charleroi	79	(2)
2026–	Panathinaikos	9	(0)

International career^{‡}
2023–2024	France U20	4	(0)
- * Club domestic league appearances and goals as of 14 November 2026 ‡ National team caps and goals as of 11 September 2026

Etienne Amara Camara (born 30 March 2003) is a French professional footballer who plays as a midfielder for Super League Greece club Panathinaikos.

== Club career ==
Born in Noisy-le-Grand, France, Camara started his football career at US Torcy and Angers SCO, before moving to Huddersfield Town in October 2020. He made his senior debut for Huddersfield on 9 January 2021, when he made a substitute appearance in a 3–2 FA Cup defeat against Plymouth Argyle.

On 13 August 2022, Camara made his league debut as an 83rd minute substitute, replacing Sorba Thomas, in a 3–1 win against Stoke City at the John Smith’s Stadium.

On 14 July 2023, Camara officially joined Italian side Udinese for an undisclosed fee, signing a four-year contract with the club. In the first half of the 2023–24 season, he appeared for Udinese once in Coppa Italia and remained on the bench in all the league games.

On 1 February 2024, Camara moved to Charleroi in Belgium and signed a three-and-a-half-year contract.

On 20 June 2026, moved to Panathinaikos on a four-year deal.

== International career ==
Born in France, Camara is of Guinean descent. He was called up to the France U20s for the 2023 FIFA U-20 World Cup, where the Bleuets got eliminated in the group stage.

== Career statistics ==
As of 28 October 2026

Appearances and goals by club, season and competition
Club	Season	League			National cup (Note: Includes FA Cup, Coppa Italia, Belgian Cup,Greek Cup)		League Cup		Continental		Other		Total	
Club	Season	Division	Apps	Goals	Apps	Goals	Apps	Goals	Apps	Goals	Apps	Goals	Apps	Goals
Huddersfield Town	2020–21	Championship	0	0	1	0	—		—		—		1	0
Huddersfield Town	2021–22	Championship	0	0	—		—		—		—		0	0
Huddersfield Town	2022–23	Championship	20	0	1	0	1	0	—		—		22	0
Huddersfield Town	Total		20	0	2	0	1	0	0	0	0	0	23	0
Udinese	2023–24	Serie A	0	0	1	0	—		—		—		1	0
Charleroi	2023–24	Belgian Pro League	6	0	—		—		—		6 (Note: Appearance(s) in Belgian Pro League relegation playoffs)	0	12	0
Charleroi	2024–25	Belgian Pro League	20	0	0	0	—		—		9 (Note: Appearance(s) in Belgian Pro League Europe playoffs)	0	29	0
Charleroi	2025–26	Belgian Pro League	29	1	4	0	—		2 (Note: Appearance(s) in UEFA Conference League)	0	9	1	44	2
Charleroi	Total		55	1	4	0	0	0	2	0	24	1	85	2
Panathinaikos	2026–27	Super League Greece	7	0	2	0	—		8	0	0	0	17	0
Career total			82	1	9	0	1	0	10	0	24	1	126	2
