= Stelios Andreou =

Cypriot footballer (born 2002)

Personal information
- Date of birth: 24 July 2002 (age 24)
- Place of birth: Nicosia, Cyprus
- Height: 1.88 m (6 ft 2 in)
- Position: Centre back

Team information
- Current team: Estoril (on loan from Widzew Łódź)

Senior career*
Years	Team	Apps	(Gls)
2020–2021	Olympiakos Nicosia	34	(1)
2021–2025	Charleroi	120	(3)
2025–	Widzew Łódź	18	(0)
2026–	→ Estoril (loan)	0	(0)

International career^{‡}
2018	Cyprus U17	4	(0)
2019	Cyprus U19	6	(0)
2020–2023	Cyprus U21	3	(0)
2021–	Cyprus	30	(1)
- * Club domestic league appearances and goals as of 17:26, 29 May 2026 (UTC) ‡ National team caps and goals as of 16:47, 7 June 2026 (UTC)

Stelios Andreou (Greek: Στέλιος Ανδρέου; born 24 July 2002) is a Cypriot professional footballer who plays as a centre-back for Primeira Liga club Estoril, on loan from Widzew Łódź, and the Cyprus national team.

== International career ==
Andreoumade his debut for the Cyprus national team on 27 March 2021 in a World Cup qualifier against Croatia.

== Career statistics ==
=== Club ===
As of match played 23 May 2026

Appearances and goals by club, season and competition
Club	Season	League			National cup (Note: Includes Cypriot Cup, Belgian Cup, Polish Cup)		Europe		Other		Total	
Club	Season	Division	Apps	Goals	Apps	Goals	Apps	Goals	Apps	Goals	Apps	Goals
Olympiakos Nicosia	2019–20	Cypriot First Division	0	0	0	0	—		0	0	0	0
Olympiakos Nicosia	2020–21	Cypriot First Division	34	1	6	1	—		0	0	40	2
Olympiakos Nicosia	Total		34	1	6	1	—		0	0	40	2
Charleroi	2021–22	Belgian First Division A	27	1	1	0	—		0	0	28	1
Charleroi	2022–23	Belgian First Division A	23	0	1	0	—		0	0	24	0
Charleroi	2023–24	Belgian First Division A	33	1	2	0	—		0	0	35	1
Charleroi	2024–25	Belgian First Division A	37	1	1	0	—		1 (Note: Appearance in European competition play-off)	0	39	1
Charleroi	Total		120	3	5	0	—		1	0	126	3
Widzew Łódź	2025–26	Ekstraklasa	18	0	4	0	—		—		22	0
Career total			172	4	15	1	0	0	1	0	188	5

=== International ===
As of match played 7 June 2026

Appearances and goals by national team and year
National team	Year	Apps	Goals
Cyprus
Cyprus	2021	5	0
Cyprus	2022	4	0
Cyprus	2023	7	0
Cyprus	2024	8	0
Cyprus	2025	4	1
Cyprus	2026	2	0
Total		30	1

Scores and results list Cyprus’ goal tally first, score column indicates score after each Andreou goal.

List of international goals scored by Stelios Andreou
No.	Date	Venue	Opponent	Score	Result	Competition
1	12 October 2025	San Marino Stadium, Serravalle, San Marino	San Marino	2–0	4–0	2026 FIFA World Cup qualification
