= AS Carrefour =

Haitian football club

- Full name: Association Sportive Carrefour
- Founded: 15 February 2000
- Manager: Jean-Claude Josephat
- League: Championnat National D3
- 2014: Championnat National D2, 37th (relegated)
Home colours

Association Sportive de Carrefour (French pronunciation: [asɔsjɑsjɔ̃ spɔʁtiv də kaʁfuʁ]; commonly referred to as AS Carrefour or ASCAR) is a professional football club based in Carrefour, Haiti. The club was promoted to the highest division of Haitian football for the first time in 2002. After 2011, Carrefour was relegated to Division 2, and again to Division 3 concluding the 2014 season.
