= Oday Dabbagh =

Palestinian footballer (born 1998)

Personal information
- Full name: Oday Ibrahim Mohammad Dabbagh
- Date of birth: 3 December 1998 (age 27)
- Place of birth: Jerusalem
- Height: 1.83 m (6 ft 0 in)
- Position: Forward

Team information
- Current team: Zamalek
- Number: 98

Youth career
- Shabab Al-Ram
- 2015: Hilal Al-Quds

Senior career*
Years	Team	Apps	(Gls)
2015–2019	Hilal Al-Quds	77	(40)
2019	Al-Salmiya	1	(1)
2019–2021	Qadsia	10	(3)
2020–2021	→ Al-Yarmouk (loan)	9	(6)
2021	Al-Arabi	18	(13)
2021–2023	Arouca	37	(11)
2023–2025	Charleroi	42	(6)
2025	→ Aberdeen (loan)	13	(1)
2025–	Zamalek	32	(9)

International career^{‡}
2015	Palestine U19	3	(0)
2017–2021	Palestine U23	15	(5)
2018–	Palestine	59	(21)
- * Club domestic league appearances and goals as of 28 October 2026 ‡ National team caps and goals as of 17 November 2026

Oday Ibrahim Mohammad Dabbagh, also Al-Dabbagh, (Arabic: عدي الدباغ; born 3 December 1998) is a Palestinian professional footballer who plays as a forward for Egyptian Premier League club Zamalek and the Palestine national team.

Dabbagh won the top scorer award in the 2020–21 Kuwaiti Premier League with Al-Arabi. With a tally of 21 goals, Al-Dabbagh stands as the all-time leading scorer in the history of the national team.

== Club career ==
=== Hilal Al-Quds ===
Dabbagh made his professional debut at the age of 16 for Hilal Al Quds in the 2015–16 season. He scored his first professional goal on 26 December 2015 during the 2–1 victory against Shabab Al-Khader.

He scored two more goals that season, narrowly helping Hilal Al-Quds avoid relegation. The following season saw Hilal Al-Quds increase their goalscoring tally with 9, 12 and 16 goals respectively as Hilal Al-Quds won the West Bank Premier League for the third time in a row. He won the WBPL Golden Boot Award for scoring 16 goals in the 2018–19 season. On 6 May 2019, Dabbagh became Palestine's all-time top scorer in the AFC Cup with a double goal against Lebanon's Nejmeh.

=== Al-Arabi ===
Dabbagh joined Al-Arabi on 14 January 2021, until the end of the season. Dabbagh helped Al-Arabi win the 2020–21 Kuwaiti Premier League title, and finished the season as league top-scorer with 13 goals.

=== Arouca ===
On 21 August 2021, Dabbagh joined Arouca in the Portuguese Primeira Liga, on a two-year contract. He made his debut on 28 August, as an 80th-minute substitute in a 3–0 defeat to Porto. On 18 September, Dabbagh scored his first goal in a 2–2 draw to Vitória de Guimarães.

In a 2–0 win over Estoril on 7 January 2023, he scored his first brace for the club. Two games later he scored twice in a 4–0 victory over Portimonense.

=== Charleroi ===
On 1 July 2023, Dabbagh officially signed for Charleroi in the Belgian Pro League on a three-year contract. He scored his first competitive goal for the Zebras on his debut in a 1–1 draw against OH Leuven.

=== Aberdeen ===
On 2 February 2025, Dabbagh was loaned to Aberdeen in the Scottish Premiership until the end of the season, with an option to buy. On 24 May 2025, he won the Scottish Cup title, converting a penalty in the shootout following a 1–1 draw. He had earlier contributed to their run to the final when during the semi-final match against Hearts, he scored a last-minute extra time goal to fire Aberdeen into the final.

=== Zamalek ===
In August 2025, Dabbagh signed a four-year contract with Egyptian Premier League side Zamalek. On 20 May 2026, he netted the only goal in a 1–0 victory over Ceramica Cleopatra on the final matchday, securing his club's 15th Egyptian Premier League title.

== International career ==
Dabbagh made his Palestine national team debut on 27 March 2018, in a 2019 AFC Asian Cup qualification match against Oman. He later appeared with the senior national team in the 2018 Bangabandhu Cup, which Palestine won. Dabbagh's first senior goal came on 6 September 2018, in a 1–1 draw with Kyrgyzstan.

At 20 years of age, Dabbagh was called up for the 2019 AFC Asian Cup, and appeared against Australia and Jordan. On 1 January 2024, he was named in the Palestinian squad for the 2023 AFC Asian Cup in Qatar. On 23 January 2024, he scored a brace in a 3–0 victory over Hong Kong, which granted his country their first win in the competition, and first ever qualification to the knockout phase as one of the best third-placed teams.

On 21 March 2024, Dabbagh scored his first international hat-trick during the 2026 FIFA World Cup qualification match against Bangladesh in a 5–0 victory.

== Personal life ==
Dabbagh was born in the Old City of Jerusalem. As a child, he admired Dutch striker Robin van Persie.

== Career statistics ==
=== Club ===
As of 20 May 2026

Appearances and goals by club, season and competition
Club	League	Season			National cup (Note: Includes Taça de Portugal, Belgian Cup, Scottish Cup)		Continental		Other		Total	
Club	League	Division	Apps	Goals	Apps	Goals	Apps	Goals	Apps	Goals	Apps	Goals
Arouca	2021–22	Primeira Liga	23	4	1	0	—		—		24	4
Arouca	2022–23	Primeira Liga	14	7	2	1	—		5 (Note: Appearances in Taça da Liga)	3	21	11
Arouca	Total		37	11	3	1	—		5	3	45	15
Charleroi	2023–24	Belgian Pro League	27	5	2	1	—		—		29	6
Charleroi	2024–25	Belgian Pro League	15	1	0	0	—		—		15	1
Charleroi	Total		42	6	2	1	—		—		44	7
Aberdeen (loan)	2024–25	Scottish Premiership	13	1	3	3	—		—		16	4
Zamalek	2025–26	Egyptian Premier League	24	10	2	0	12 (Note: Appearance in CAF Confederation Cup)	4	5 (Note: One appearance in Egyptian Super Cup, four appearances in Egyptian League Cup)	0	43	14
Career total			116	28	10	5	12	4	10	3	148	40

=== International ===
As of match played 2 October 2026
Scores and results list Palestine's goal tally first, score column indicates score after each Dabbagh goal.

List of international goals scored by Oday Dabbagh
No.	Date	Venue	Opponent	Score	Result	Competition
1	6 September 2018	Dolen Omurzakov Stadium, Bishkek, Kyrgyzstan	Kyrgyzstan	1–1	1–1	Friendly
2	11 August 2019	Karbala International Stadium, Karbala, Iraq	Syria	2–1	4–3	2019 WAFF Championship
3	11 August 2019	Karbala International Stadium, Karbala, Iraq	Syria	3–1	4–3	2019 WAFF Championship
4	5 September 2019	Faisal Al-Husseini International Stadium, Al-Ram, Palestine	Uzbekistan	1–0	2–0	2022 FIFA World Cup qualification
5	3 June 2021	King Fahd International Stadium, Riyadh, Saudi Arabia	Singapore	2–0	4–0	2022 FIFA World Cup qualification
6	15 June 2021	King Fahd International Stadium, Riyadh, Saudi Arabia	Yemen	1–0	3–0	2022 FIFA World Cup qualification
7	15 June 2021	King Fahd International Stadium, Riyadh, Saudi Arabia	Yemen	3–0	3–0	2022 FIFA World Cup qualification
8	24 June 2021	Jassim bin Hamad Stadium, Doha, Qatar	Comoros	2–1	5–1	2021 FIFA Arab Cup qualification
9	8 June 2022	MFF Football Centre, Ulaanbaatar, Mongolia	Mongolia	1–0	1–0	2023 AFC Asian Cup qualification
10	11 June 2022	MFF Football Centre, Ulaanbaatar, Mongolia	Yemen	1–0	5–0	2023 AFC Asian Cup qualification
11	23 January 2024	Abdullah bin Khalifa Stadium, Doha, Qatar	Hong Kong	1–0	3–0	2023 AFC Asian Cup
12	23 January 2024	Abdullah bin Khalifa Stadium, Doha, Qatar	Hong Kong	3–0	3–0	2023 AFC Asian Cup
13	29 January 2024	Al Bayt Stadium, Al Khor, Qatar	Qatar	1–0	1–2	2023 AFC Asian Cup
14	21 March 2024	Jaber Al-Ahmad International Stadium, Kuwait City, Kuwait	Bangladesh	1–0	5–0	2026 FIFA World Cup qualification
15	21 March 2024	Jaber Al-Ahmad International Stadium, Kuwait City, Kuwait	Bangladesh	4–0	5–0	2026 FIFA World Cup qualification
16	21 March 2024	Jaber Al-Ahmad International Stadium, Kuwait City, Kuwait	Bangladesh	5–0	5–0	2026 FIFA World Cup qualification
17	11 December 2025	Lusail Stadium, Lusail, Qatar	Saudi Arabia	1–1	1–2 (a.e.t.)	2025 FIFA Arab Cup
18	24 September 2026	Tongliang Long Stadium, Chongqing, China	New Zealand	2–2	2–2	Friendly
19	28 September 2026	Tongliang Long Stadium, Chongqing, China	Tajikistan	4–2	4–2	Friendly
20	2 October 2026	Longxing Football Stadium, Chongqing, China	China	3–0	5–0	Friendly
21	2 October 2026	Longxing Football Stadium, Chongqing, China	China	4–0	5–0	Friendly

== Honours ==
Hilal Al-Quds

- West Bank Premier League: 2016–17, 2017–18, 2018–19
- Palestine Cup: 2017–18
- West Bank Cup: 2017–18

Qadsia

- Kuwait Super Cup: 2019

Al-Arabi

- Kuwaiti Premier League: 2020–21

Aberdeen

- Scottish Cup: 2024–25

Zamalek

- Egyptian Premier League: 2025–26
- CAF Confederation Cup runner-up: 2025–26

Palestine

- Bangabandhu Cup: 2018

Individual

- Islamic Solidarity Games top goalscorer: 2017
- Kuwaiti Premier League top goalscorer: 2020–21
