= Noam Mayoka-Tika =

Belgian footballer

Personal information
- Date of birth: 2 November 2003 (age 23)
- Place of birth: Charleroi, Belgium
- Height: 1.84 m (6 ft 0 in)
- Position: Midfielder

Team information
- Current team: Lierse (on loan from Charleroi)
- Number: 3

Youth career
- –2022: Mouscron
- 2022–2023: Westerlo

Senior career*
Years	Team	Apps	(Gls)
2021–2022	Mouscron	3	(0)
2022–2023	Westerlo	0	(0)
2023	Marseille B	12	(0)
2024	Marseille	1	(0)
2024–	Charleroi	1	(0)
2024–	Zébra Élites	22	(2)
2025–	→ Lierse (loan)	29	(0)
- * Club domestic league appearances and goals as of 20 April 2026

Noam Mayoka-Tika (born 2 November 2003) is a Belgian professional footballer who plays as a midfielder for Challenger Pro League club Lierse on loan from Charleroi.

== Club career ==
On 29 July 2025, Mayoka-Tika joined Lierse on loan with an option to buy.

== Personal life ==
Born in Belgium, Mayoka-Tika is of DR Congolese and Algerian descent.

== Career statistics ==
As of 12 January 2024

Appearances and goals by club, season and competition
Club	Season	League			Cup		Other		Total	
Club	Season	Division	Apps	Goals	Apps	Goals	Apps	Goals	Apps	Goals
Mouscron	2021–22	First Division B	3	0	0	0	0	0	3	0
Marseille B	2023–24	CFA 2	12	0	—		—		12	0
Marseille	2023–24	Ligue 1	1	0	0	0	0	0	1	0
Career total			16	0	0	0	0	0	16	0
