= Daan Heymans =

Belgian footballer

Personal information
- Date of birth: 15 June 1999 (age 27)
- Place of birth: Turnhout, Belgium
- Height: 1.86 m (6 ft 1 in)
- Position: Attacking midfielder

Team information
- Current team: Genk
- Number: 38

Youth career
- 2005−2009: KSK Retie
- 2009−2016: Westerlo

Senior career*
Years	Team	Apps	(Gls)
2016–2018	Westerlo	25	(4)
2018–2021	Waasland-Beveren	37	(8)
2019	→ Lommel SK (loan)	12	(1)
2021–2022	Venezia	7	(0)
2022	→ Charleroi (loan)	16	(4)
2022–2025	Charleroi	107	(22)
2025–	Genk	38	(11)

International career^{‡}
2017	Belgium U18	2	(0)
- * Club domestic league appearances and goals as of 25 October 2026 ‡ National team caps and goals as of 15 April 2019

Daan Heymans (born 15 June 1999) is a Belgian professional footballer who plays as an attacking midfielder for Belgian Pro League club Genk.

== Club career ==
On 27 January 2022, Heymans joined Charleroi on a 1.5-year loan with an option to buy. On 3 July 2022, he moved to Charleroi on a permanent basis and signed a three-year contract.

On 18 June 2025, Heymans signed a four-year contract with Genk.

== Career statistics ==
=== Club ===
As of match played 25 October 2026

Appearances and goals by club, season and competition
Club	Season	League			National Cup (Note: Includes Belgian Cup, Coppa Italia)		Europe		Other		Total	
Club	Season	Division	Apps	Goals	Apps	Goals	Apps	Goals	Apps	Goals	Apps	Goals
Westerlo	2016–17	Belgian Pro League	1	0	0	0	—		—		1	0
Westerlo	2017–18	Challenger Pro League	24	4	2	0	—		—		26	4
Westerlo	Total		25	4	2	0	—		—		27	4
Waasland-Beveren	2018–19	Belgian Pro League	2	0	0	0	—		—		2	0
Waasland-Beveren	2019–20	Belgian Pro League	5	0	0	0	—		—		5	0
Waasland-Beveren	2020–21	Belgian Pro League	32	8	2	1	—		—		34	9
Waasland-Beveren	Total		39	8	2	1	—		—		41	9
Lommel (loan)	2018–19	Challenger Pro League	12	1	0	0	—		—		12	1
Venezia	2021–22	Serie A	7	0	3	1	—		—		10	1
Charleroi	2021–22	Belgian Pro League	10	2	0	0	—		6 (Note: Appearance(s) in play-off)	2	16	4
Charleroi	2022–23	Belgian Pro League	33	6	1	1	—		—		34	7
Charleroi	2023–24	Belgian Pro League	35	3	2	2	—		—		37	5
Charleroi	2024–25	Belgian Pro League	29	11	1	1	—		10 (Note: Nine appearances and three goals in European play-offs, One appearance in Europa League play-offs)	3	40	15
Charleroi	Total		107	22	4	4	—		16	5	133	31
Genk	2025–26	Belgian Pro League	29	10	2	2	10 (Note: Appearance(s) in UEFA Europa League)	4	—		41	16
Genk	2026–27	Belgian Pro League	9	1	1	1	—		—		10	2
Genk	Total		38	11	3	3	10	4	—		51	18
Career total			228	46	14	9	10	4	16	5	268	64
