= Mondy Prunier =

Haitian footballer (born 1999)

Personal information
- Date of birth: 22 December 1999 (age 26)
- Place of birth: Carrefour, Port-au-Prince, Haiti
- Height: 1.88 m (6 ft 2 in)
- Position: Forward

Team information
- Current team: Orléans
- Number: 9

Senior career*
Years	Team	Apps	(Gls)
2015–2016	Truitier	20	(26)
2017–2018	Carrefour	19	(20)
2019	Red Star Baie-Mahault	6	(7)
2019–2021	Red Star Baie-Mahault	42	(44)
2021–2022	Rouen	20	(9)
2022–2024	Versailles	58	(14)
2024–2026	Charleroi	0	(0)
2024–2025	→ Francs Borains (loan)	28	(10)
2025	→ Eupen (loan)	10	(0)
2026	→ Francs Borains (loan)	14	(2)
2026–	Orléans	1	(0)

International career^{‡}
2022–	Haiti	14	(7)
- * Club domestic league appearances and goals as of 5 September 2026 ‡ National team caps and goals as of 10 June 2025

Mondy Prunier (born 22 December 1999) is a Haitian professional footballer who plays as a forward for Ligue 3 club Orléans and the Haiti national team.

== Early life ==
Born in Bergamote, a district of Carrefour in the Port-au-Prince Arrondissement of Haiti, Prunier grew up without his parents.

== Club career ==
Prunier began his footballing career with AS Truitier, where he spent two seasons under coach Jean Romel Anéas. In his first two seasons, he scored twenty-six goals in just twenty league games, and this prolific form continued at AS Carrefour, where he spent another two seasons before departing for Guadeloupean side Red Star Baie-Mahault. Red Star president Paulin Éric had attended a Carrefour game, and invited Prunier to join the club after being impressed by his performance.

Prunier joined the club on an internship basis in January 2019, scoring seven goals in six games before having to return to Haiti as his visa had expired. Despite his contribution, Red Star were relegated to the Guadeloupe Regional Honorary Promotion Championship, the country's second division, though Prunier returned for the 2019–20 season, scoring twenty-seven goals in nineteen appearances to guide Red Star to first place and promotion.

Though he had a contract with Red Star, his visa expired again in July 2021, and having scored seventeen goals in twenty-three games in his last season, Prunier left the club. He had trialled with French side Boulogne in February 2020, and returned to the country in June 2021, signing a two-year professional deal with Championnat National 2 side Rouen. In his first and only season with the club, he finished as their top scorer, with nine goals in twenty appearances.

These impressive performances reportedly attracted the attention of a number of clubs in France, with Ligue 2 side Metz touted as one of the clubs interested. He went on to join Versailles in the Championnat National, signing a three-year deal with the Île-de-France club. A transfer fee was paid by Versailles, a rarity in the lower divisions of France.

Having scored on his debut against Martigues on 12 August 2022, he only played once more before a month-long period without featuring - which he later revealed was due to issues with his residency permit. At the conclusion of the 2022–23 season, he was awarded Versailles' player of the year award, having scored seven goals in twenty-seven appearances.

On 31 July 2024, Prunier joined Belgian club Charleroi and was immediately loaned to Francs Borains. On 2 September 2025, he moved on a new loan to Eupen.

== International career ==
Having not been called up for Haiti at youth international level, he received his first call up to the full national team in May 2022, ahead of fixtures against Montserrat and Guyana the following month. He marked his international debut with a goal against Montserrat, taking only five minutes to find the back of the net in a 3–2 win, before following this up with two goals in a 6–0 win against Guyana. He scored his fourth goal for Haiti in a 4–0 win against Montserrat, which guaranteed Haiti qualification for the 2023 CONCACAF Gold Cup.

== Career statistics ==
=== Club ===
As of 18 April 2025.

Appearances and goals by club, season and competition
Club	Season	League			Cup		Other		Total	
Club	Season	Division	Apps	Goals	Apps	Goals	Apps	Goals	Apps	Goals
Truitier	2015	Haitian Third Division	15	20	0	0	0	0	15	20
Truitier	2016	Haitian Second Division	5	6	0	0	0	0	5	6
Truitier	Total		20	26	0	0	0	0	20	26
Carrefour	2017	Haitian Second Division	10	11	0	0	0	0	10	11
Carrefour	2018	Haitian Second Division	9	9	0	0	0	0	9	9
Carrefour	Total		19	20	0	0	0	0	19	20
Red Star Baie-Mahault	2018–19	Guadeloupe Division of Honour	6	7	0	0	0	0	6	7
Red Star Baie-Mahault	2019–20	Honorary Promotion Championship	19	27	0	0	0	0	19	27
Red Star Baie-Mahault	2020–21	Guadeloupe Division of Honour	23	17	0	0	0	0	23	17
Red Star Baie-Mahault	Total		48	51	0	0	0	0	48	51
Rouen	2021–22	Championnat National 2	20	9	2	2	0	0	22	11
Versailles	2022–23	Championnat National	27	7	1	2	0	0	28	9
Versailles	2023–24	Championnat National	31	7	2	2	0	0	33	9
Versailles	Total		58	14	3	4	0	0	61	18
Francs Borains (loan)	2024–25	Challenger Pro League	28	10	0	0	0	0	28	10
Career total			193	130	5	6	0	0	198	136

=== International ===
National team	Year	Apps	Goals
Haiti	2022	2	3
Haiti	2023	7	2
Haiti	2024	5	1
Haiti	2025	1	0
Total		15	6

Scores and results list Haiti's goal tally first, score column indicates score after each Haiti goal.

List of international goals scored by Mondy Prunier
No.	Date	Venue	Opponent	Score	Result	Competition
1	7 June 2022	Félix Sánchez Olympic Stadium, Dominican Republic	Montserrat	1–0	3–2	2022–23 CONCACAF Nations League B
2	14 June 2022	Félix Sánchez Olympic Stadium, Dominican Republic	Guyana	2–0	6–0	2022–23 CONCACAF Nations League B
3	14 June 2022	Félix Sánchez Olympic Stadium, Dominican Republic	Guyana	4–0	6–0	2022–23 CONCACAF Nations League B
4	25 March 2023	Blakes Estate Stadium, Montserrat	Montserrat	4–0	4–0	2022–23 CONCACAF Nations League B
5	13 June 2023	Stade Sylvio Cator, Haiti	Saint Kitts and Nevis	2–1	3–1	Friendly
6	15 November 2024	Mayagüez Athletics Stadium, Puerto Rico	Saint Martin	8–0	8–0	2024–25 CONCACAF Nations League B
7	7 June 2025	Trinidad Stadium, Aruba	Aruba	5–0	5–0	2026 FIFA World Cup qualification
