= Cheick Keita (footballer, born 2003) =

Malian footballer (born 2003)

Personal information
- Full name: Cheick Keita
- Date of birth: 2 April 2003 (age 23)
- Place of birth: Champigny-sur-Marne, France
- Height: 1.85 m (6 ft 1 in)
- Position: Centre-back

Team information
- Current team: Charleroi
- Number: 95

Youth career
- 2013–2016: Saint-Leu FC
- 2016–2019: Saint-Brice FC
- 2019–2020: Reims

Senior career*
Years	Team	Apps	(Gls)
2020–2024	Reims II	13	(0)
2022–2024	Reims	9	(0)
2023–2024	→ Bastia (loan)	27	(1)
2024–	Charleroi	69	(7)

International career^{‡}
2022–2024	France U20	10	(1)
2025–	Mali	2	(0)
- * Club domestic league appearances and goals as of 19 September 2026 ‡ National team caps and goals as of 21:02, 5 October 2026 (UTC)

Cheick Keita (born 2 April 2003) is a professional footballer who plays as a centre-back for Belgian Pro League club Charleroi. Born in France, he plays for the Mali national team.

== Club career ==
Keita is a youth product of the Reims youth academy. He began his senior career with their reserves in 2020. On 30 October 2022, he made his senior and professional debut with Reims in a 2–1 Ligue 1 win over Auxerre on 23 October 2022.

On 4 July 2024, Keita signed a contract with Charleroi in Belgium for three seasons, with an optional fourth.

== International career ==
Born in France, Keita holds French and Malian nationalities. He is a youth international for France, having played up to the France U20s. He was called up to the Mali national team for a set of friendlies in June 2025.

== Career statistics ==
=== Club ===
As of match played 19 September 2026

Appearances and goals by club, season and competition
Club	Season	League			National cup		Europe		Total	
Club	Season	Division	Apps	Goals	Apps	Goals	Apps	Goals	Apps	Goals
Reims II	2020–21	CFA	1	0	—		—		1	0
Reims II	2021–22	CFA	1	0	—		—		1	0
Reims II	2022–23	CFA	11	0	—		—		11	0
Reims II	Total		13	0	—		—		13	0
Reims	2022–23	Ligue 1	9	0	1	0	—		10	0
Bastia (loan)	2023–24	Ligue 2	27	1	1	0	—		28	1
Bastia B (loan)	2023–24	CFA 2	1	0	—		—		1	0
Charleroi	2024–25	Belgian Pro League	23	0	1	0	—		24	0
Charleroi	2025–26	Belgian Pro League	40	3	5	0	2 (Note: Appearances in UEFA Conference League)	0	47	3
Charleroi	2026–27	Belgian Pro League	6	1	0	0	—		6	1
Charleroi	Total		69	4	6	0	2	0	77	4
Career total			119	5	8	0	2	0	129	5

=== International ===
As of match played 4 October 2026

Appearances and goals by national team and year
National team	Year	Apps	Goals
Mali	2025	1	0
Mali	2026	1	0
Total		2	0
