= Mohamed Koné (footballer, born 2002) =

Footballer (born 2002)

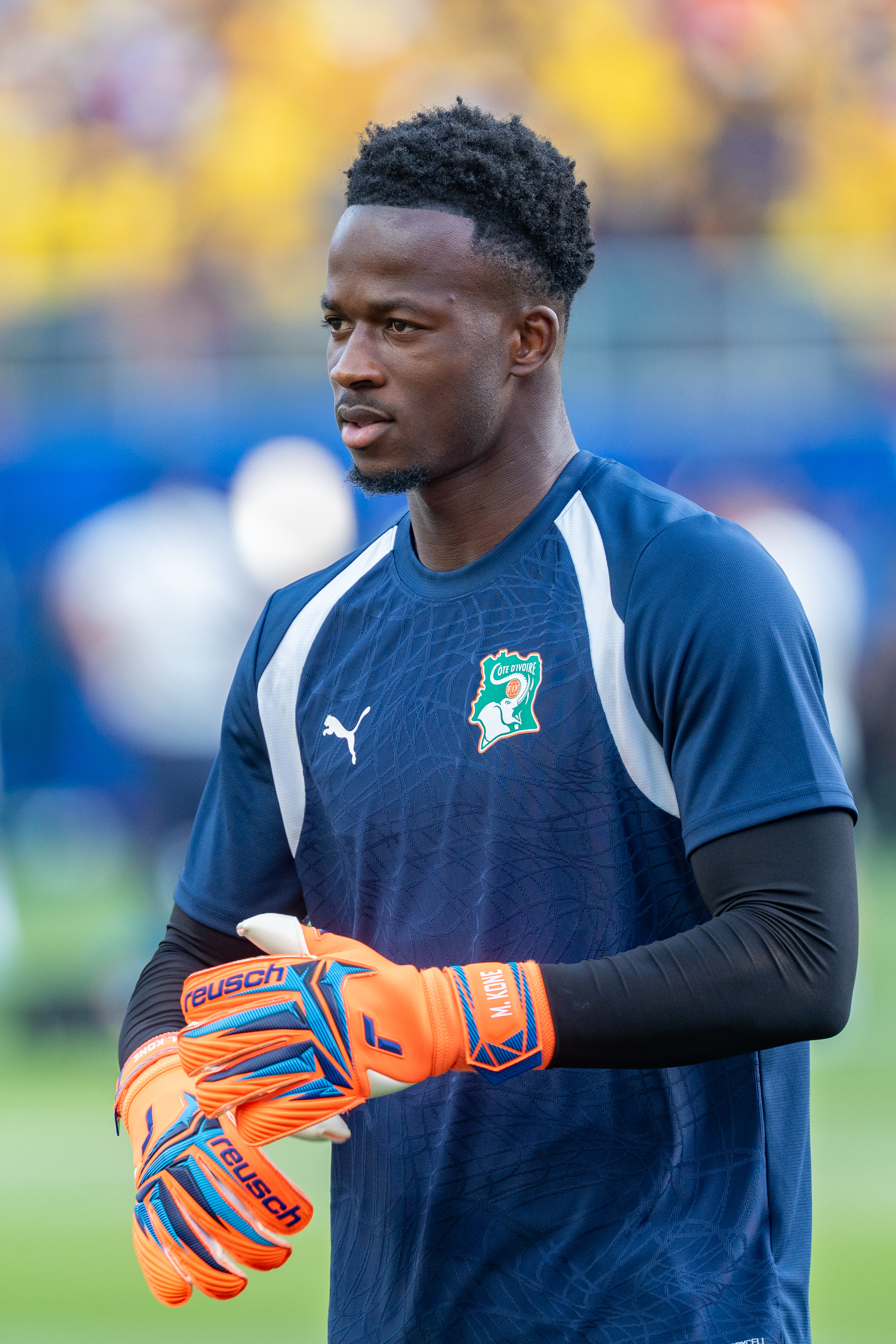
- Koné with Ivory Coast in 2026

Personal information
- Date of birth: 7 March 2002 (age 24)
- Place of birth: Adjamé, Ivory Coast
- Height: 1.90 m (6 ft 3 in)
- Position: Goalkeeper

Team information
- Current team: Charleroi
- Number: 30

Youth career
- Neuilly Plaisance FC
- 2019–2020: Torcy

Senior career*
Years	Team	Apps	(Gls)
2020–2023	Le Havre B	41	(0)
2021–2024	Le Havre	0	(0)
2024	→ Dunkerque (loan)	15	(0)
2024–	Charleroi	40	(0)

International career
2023	Ivory Coast U23	4	(0)
- * Club domestic league appearances and goals as of 1 June 2026

Mohamed Koné (born 7 March 2002) is an Ivorian professional footballer who plays as a goalkeeper for Belgian club Charleroi.

== Club career ==
A youth product of Torcy, Koné transferred to Le Havre in 2020 and began playing with their reserves. He made appearances on the bench for the senior team in 2021, and on 1 July 2022 signed a 3-year professional contract with the club. He made his senior and professional debut with the senior Le Havre side in a 2–1 Coupe de la Ligue win over Caen on 7 January 2024. On 17 January 2024, he joined Dunkerque for the second half of the 2023–24 season in the Ligue 2.

On 2 July 2024, Charleroi signed Koné on a three-year deal.

== International career ==
In March 2022, Koné received his first call-up to the senior Ivory Coast national team. In June 2023, he was called up to the final Ivory Coast U23 squad for the 2023 Maurice Revello Tournament.

Koné was again called up for 2025 Africa Cup of Nations qualification games against Sierra Leone in October 2024, but remained on the bench for both games.

On May 15, 2026, Koné was integrated by Ivory Coast coach Emerse Faé in his list of 26 players in order to participate in the 2026 World Cup.

== Career statistics ==
=== Club ===
As of match played 17 May 2024

Appearances and goals by club, season and competition
Club	Season	League			Cup		Europe		Other		Total	
Club	Season	Division	Apps	Goals	Apps	Goals	Apps	Goals	Apps	Goals	Apps	Goals
Le Havre B	2020–21	Championnat National 3	1	0	—		—		—		1	0
Le Havre B	2021–22	Championnat National 3	21	0	—		—		—		21	0
Le Havre B	2022–23	Championnat National 3	16	0	—		—		—		16	0
Le Havre B	2023–24	Championnat National 3	3	0	—		—		—		3	0
Le Havre B	Total		41	0	—		—		—		41	0
Le Havre	2021–22	Ligue 2	0	0	0	0	—		—		0	0
Le Havre	2023–24	Ligue 1	0	0	1	0	—		—		1	0
Le Havre	Total		0	0	1	0	—		—		1	0
Dunkerque (loan)	2023–24	Ligue 2	15	0	0	0	—		—		15	0
Royal Charleroi	2024–25	Belgian Pro League	0	0	0	0	—		—		0	0
Career total			56	0	1	0	0	0	0	0	57	0

== Honours ==
Le Havre

- Ligue 2: 2022–23
