= Pierre Patron =

French footballer (born 1997)

Personal information
- Date of birth: 20 August 1997 (age 29)
- Place of birth: Vannes, France
- Height: 1.91 m (6 ft 3 in)
- Position: Goalkeeper

Team information
- Current team: Concarneau
- Number: 40

Youth career
- –2013: Vannes
- 2013–2016: Brest

Senior career*
Years	Team	Apps	(Gls)
2015–2016	Brest B	1	(0)
2016–2019	Clermont	0	(0)
2016–2019	Clermont B	41	(0)
2019–2022	Le Mans	81	(0)
2019	Le Mans B	3	(0)
2022–2024	Charleroi	10	(0)
2022–2024	Zébra Élites	12	(0)
2024–2025	Quevilly-Rouen	11	(0)
2025–	Concarneau	7	(0)
- * Club domestic league appearances and goals as of 23 June 2026

Pierre Patron (born 20 August 1997) is a French professional footballer who plays as a goalkeeper for Ligue 3 club Concarneau.

== Life and career ==
Patron was born in Vannes in 1997, and raised in Saint-Avé. His father was a driving instructor and his mother a childminder. He played football for his hometown club, Vannes OC from age 10 to 15, before spending the next four years with Brest. During that time, he passed his baccalauréat and began a college course in sports studies. As a 17-year-old, he played in the senior squad that won the 2015 Coupe de Bretagne Senior, and the following season, he made one appearance in the fifth-tier Championnat de France Amateur 2 (CFA2) and was part of the under-19 squad that reached the semi-final of that season's Coupe Gambardella, in which they lost to a Monaco under-19 side featuring the already first-team regular Kylian Mbappé. He was however second-choice goalkeeper behind Gautier Larsonneur at under-19 level, and was released in 2016.

After trials with Lorient, Angers and Clermont, Patron signed for the latter as fourth-choice goalkeeper, with the prospect of moving up the pecking order if he had a good season with the B-team in the CFA2. He played 19 matches, and in his second season trained regularly with the professional group while playing 20 matches in the 2017–18 Championnat National 3 (successor to the CFA2). In August 2019, he was one of several younger players selected to start the Coupe de la Ligue first round match against third-tier Laval, which Clermont won 3–0. He was named as substitute goalkeeper for the Ligue 2 team on 12 occasions that season, but never took the field.

He signed for Le Mans, newly promoted to Ligue 2, in June 2019. Initially third choice goalkeeper, a dislocated finger for Yoann Thuram gave Patron a seat on the bench, and when Jérémy Aymes was injured while making a clearance 11 minutes into the Coupe de la Ligue round of 32 match against Nice on 30 October, Patron made an unexpected first-team debut. He conceded twice in his first few minutes on the field, but kept a clean sheet thereafter as Le Mans beat the Ligue 1 side 3–2 to go through to the next round. Three days later, Patron made his first appearance in Ligue 2, away to Clermont where he had spent the previous three years; he kept a clean sheet as Le Mans won 1–0.

On 4 July 2022, Patron signed a contract with Charleroi in Belgium for the term of 2 years, with an option for 2 more.

On 19 June 2024, Patron agreed to move to Quevilly-Rouen for two seasons.
