= Jules Van Cleemput =

Belgian footballer

Personal information
- Date of birth: 11 April 1997 (age 29)
- Place of birth: Belgium
- Height: 1.82 m (6 ft 0 in)
- Position: Right back

Youth career
- –2015: Mechelen

Senior career*
Years	Team	Apps	(Gls)
2015–2020	Mechelen	54	(0)
2016	→ Heist (loan)	12	(1)
2020–2024	Charleroi	56	(2)
2024–2025	Mechelen	10	(0)

International career
2012	Belgium U15	1	(0)
2015–2016	Belgium U19	8	(0)
- * Club domestic league appearances and goals

Jules Van Cleemput (born 11 April 1997) is a Belgian former football player who played as centre back.

== Club career ==
=== Mechelen ===
In 2015, Van Cleemput was called up for Mechelen first team. He had ridden the pine in the two games in 2015, but he didn't play any games in the first team.

==== Heist (loan) ====
On 4 January 2016, Van Cleemput was loaned to Heist in Belgian Second Division for six months. On 17 January 2016, Van Cleemput made his Belgian Second Division debut against Deinze at Burgemeester Van de Wiele Stadion, playing the game as a starter for full-time game. In the game, he was shown a yellow card. On 20 February 2016, Van Cleemput scored his first league goal against ASV Geel at 68th minute. In 2015–16 season, Van Cleemput played twelve games and scored a goal and he was shown six yellow card and even a red card once. In the season Heist relegated to the 2016–17 Belgian First Amateur Division.

==== Return from loan spell ====
As the loan term was expired, Van Cleemput returned to Mechelen on 1 July 2016. On 2 December 2016, Van Cleemput made his Belgian First Division A debut against K.A.S. Eupen at AFAS-stadion Achter de Kazerne, replacing Xavier Chen at the 38th minute.

=== Return to Mechelen ===
On 15 July 2024, Van Cleemput returned to Mechelen. On 28 February 2025, he retired from playing due to persistent injuries.

== International career ==
Van Cleemput was a member of Belgium national under-19 football team in the 2016 UEFA European Under-19 Championship qualification.
