= Martin Delavallée =

Belgian footballer (born 2004)

Personal information
- Date of birth: 18 March 2004 (age 22)
- Place of birth: Charleroi, Belgium
- Height: 1.85 m (6 ft 1 in)
- Position: Goalkeeper

Team information
- Current team: Royal Charleroi
- Number: 55

Youth career
- 2009–2019: CS Entité Manageoise
- 2019–2022: Mouscron

Senior career*
Years	Team	Apps	(Gls)
2022	Mouscron	1	(0)
2022–	Zebra Elites	37	(0)
2023–	Royal Charleroi	42	(0)

International career^{‡}
2021	Belgium U18	1	(0)
2026–	Belgium U21	1	(0)
- * Club domestic league appearances and goals as of 1 June 2026 ‡ National team caps and goals as of 22:15, 9 November 2025 (UTC)

Martin Delavallée (born 18 March 2004) is a Belgian professional football player who plays as a goalkeeper for the Belgian Pro League club Royal Charleroi.

== Club career ==
Delavallée is a product of the academies of the Belgian clubs CS Entité Manageoise and Mouscron. On 11 June 2021, he signed his first professional contract with Mouscron. On 17 April 2022, he debuted with Mouscron as a substitute in a 2–0 loss to S.K. Beveren in the Challenger Pro League. On 19 June 2022 he transferred to Royal Charleroi on a 1+1 year contract, and started playing for their reeserves. On 3 April 2023, his contract was renewed an additional year. Shortly after on 4 July 2023, he extended his contract until 2025 and started playing with their senior team. On 14 December 2024, he again extended his contract with the club until 2027. In the second half of the 2024–25 season he was started playing as their starting goalkeeper.

== International career ==
On 21 October 2021, Delavallée debuted with the Belgium U18s for a friendly against the Czechia U18s.

== Personal life ==
Before committing to football, Delavallée was a renowned player for the Belgian game Balle pelote.
