= Mardochee Nzita =

Belgian footballer

Personal information
- Full name: Mardochée Nzita Theto
- Date of birth: 24 February 2000 (age 26)
- Place of birth: Kinshasa, DR Congo
- Height: 1.78 m (5 ft 10 in)
- Position: Defender

Team information
- Current team: Charleroi
- Number: 24

Youth career
- 2004-2005: Asse-Zellik 2002
- 2005-2019: Anderlecht

Senior career*
Years	Team	Apps	(Gls)
2019–2021	Perugia	13	(0)
2020–2021	→ Pescara (loan)	20	(0)
2021–2022	Pescara	21	(1)
2022–2024	Beerschot	43	(5)
2024–	Charleroi	60	(0)

International career^{‡}
2017	Belgium U17	1	(0)
- * Club domestic league appearances and goals as of 1 June 2026 ‡ National team caps and goals as of 3 February 2017

Mardochée Nzita Theto (born 24 February 2000) is a football player who plays for Charleroi. Born in the DR Congo, he is a youth international for Belgium.

== Club career ==
He was raised in the youth teams of Anderlecht and represented the club in the 2018–19 UEFA Youth League.

On 16 July 2019 he signed a contract with Italian Serie B club Perugia for a term of 3 years with an additional 1-year extension option.

He made his Serie B debut for Perugia on 21 September 2019 in a game against Spezia. He started the game and played the whole match.

On 5 October 2020 he joined Pescara on loan with an obligation to buy.

On 10 April 2022 Nzita signed a contract with Beerschot, effective from 1 July 2022 to June 2025.

On 15 June 2024, Nzita agreed to move to Charleroi on a four-year contract.
