= Žan Rogelj =

Slovenian footballer (born 1999)

Personal information
- Date of birth: 25 November 1999 (age 26)
- Place of birth: Kranj, Slovenia
- Height: 1.75 m (5 ft 9 in)
- Positions: Right-back; right midfielder

Team information
- Current team: Wisła Płock
- Number: 21

Youth career
- –2018: Triglav Kranj

Senior career*
| Years | Team | Apps | (Gls) |
| 2017–2020 | Triglav Kranj | 52 | (1) |
| 2020–2023 | WSG Tirol | 90 | (7) |
| 2023–2026 | Charleroi | 56 | (2) |
| 2025–2026 | → Wisła Płock (loan) | 26 | (3) |
| 2026– | Wisła Płock | 1 | (1) |

International career
| 2015–2016 | Slovenia U17 | 9 | (0) |
| 2016–2017 | Slovenia U18 | 9 | (0) |
| 2017 | Slovenia U19 | 7 | (1) |
| 2019–2021 | Slovenia U21 | 12 | (0) |
| 2021 | Slovenia | 3 | (0) |
- * Club domestic league appearances and goals as of 27 July 2026

Žan Rogelj (born 25 November 1999) is a Slovenian professional footballer who plays as a right-back or right midfielder for Ekstraklasa club Wisła Płock.

== Club career ==
Rogelj started the 2018–19 season as a reserve player for the Slovenian top flight side Triglav Kranj but ended the season as a starter, making 22 league appearances.

In August 2020, he signed for WSG Tirol in the Austrian Bundesliga.

== International career ==
Rogelj debuted with the senior Slovenia national team in a friendly 6–0 win over Gibraltar on 4 June 2021.

== Career statistics ==
=== International ===
Appearances and goals by national team and year
| National team | Year | Apps | Goals |
|---|---|---|---|
Slovenia
| Slovenia | 2021 | 3 | 0 |
| Total | | 3 | 0 |
