= Parfait Guiagon =

Ivorian footballer (born 2001)

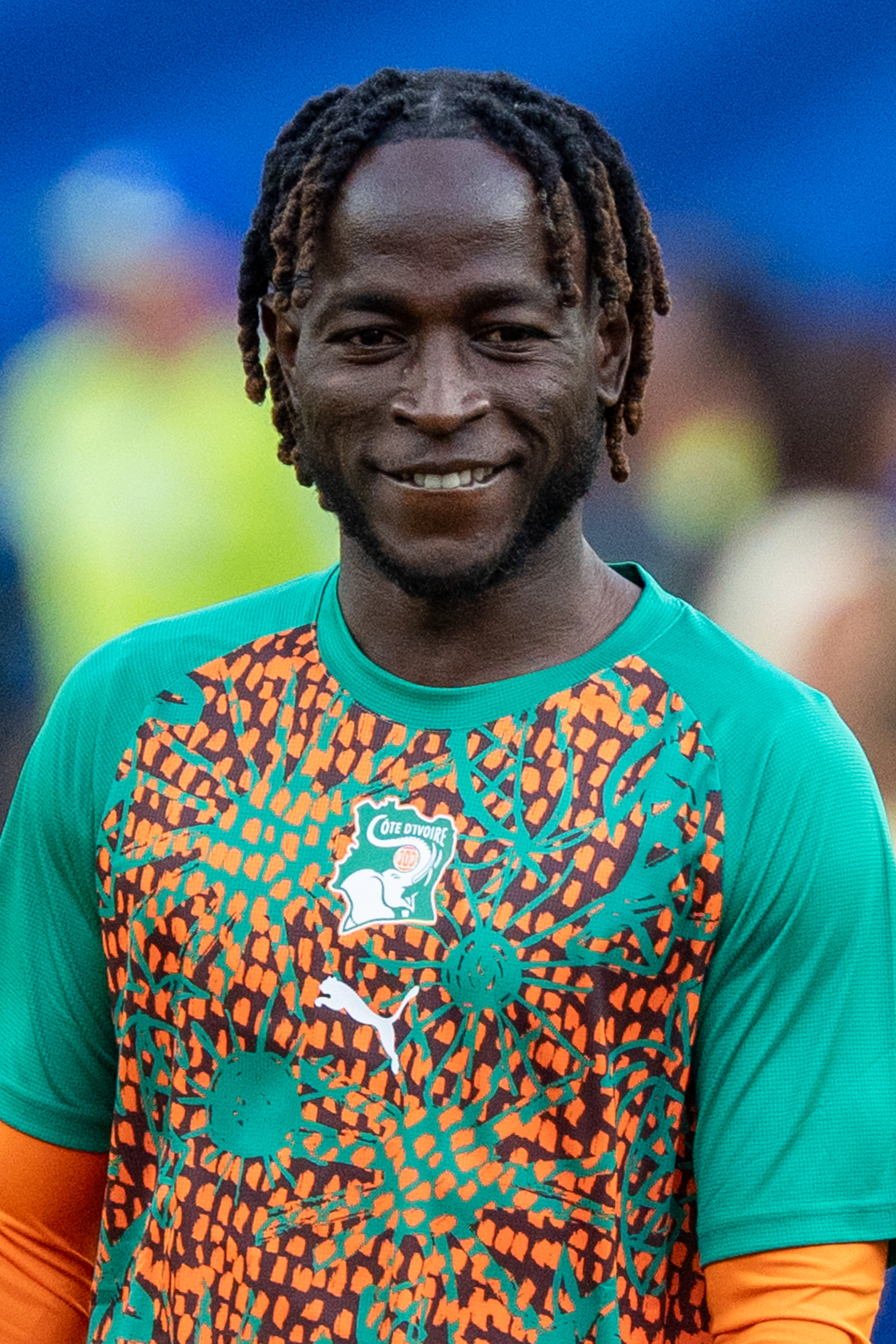
- Guiagon with the Ivory Coast in 2026

Personal information
- Date of birth: 22 February 2001 (age 25)
- Place of birth: Logoualé, Ivory Coast
- Height: 1.69 m (5 ft 7 in)
- Position: Midfielder

Team information
- Current team: Al Taawoun
- Number: 8

Youth career
- Africa Sports
- 2019–2020: Maccabi Tel Aviv

Senior career*
Years	Team	Apps	(Gls)
2020	Africa Sports		
2020	→ Maccabi Tel Aviv (loan)	3	(0)
2020–2023	Maccabi Tel Aviv	35	(4)
2020–2021	→ Beitar Tel Aviv Bat Yam (loan)	26	(4)
2021–2022	→ Maccabi Netanya (loan)	28	(5)
2023–2026	Charleroi	98	(22)
2026–	Al Taawoun	4	(0)

International career^{‡}
2025–	Ivory Coast	5	(0)
- * Club domestic league appearances and goals as of 12 September 2026 ‡ National team caps and goals as of 28 March 2026

Parfait Guiagon (born 22 February 2001) is an Ivorian professional footballer who plays as a midfielder for Saudi Pro League club Al Taawoun and the Ivory Coast national team. He was included in The Guardian's "Next Generation 2018".

== Club career ==
Born in Ivory Coast, Guiagon was developed in the youth academy of local club Africa Sports, where he was named the league's Best Young Player for the 2016–17 season. He underwent trials with AS Monaco, Barcelona, and Club Brugge, signing a pre-contract with the latter, but ultimately moved to Israel on 31 August 2019 to join Maccabi Tel Aviv.

Guiagon made his debut for Maccabi Tel Aviv on 20 June 2020, coming on as a substitute in a 2–0 victory over Hapoel Tel Aviv.

On 31 August 2021, Guiagon joined Maccabi Netanya on a season-long loan. He scored his first goal for the club on 2 October 2021 in a 3–1 league win against Bnei Sakhnin.

Guiagon returned to Maccabi Tel Aviv ahead of the 2022–23 season and signed a contract extension on 28 June 2022, keeping him at the club until June 2025.

On 29 August 2023, Guiagon signed for Belgian club Charleroi on a three-year contract running until June 2026, with an option for an additional season.

He scored his first goal for Charleroi in his second appearance for the club on 16 September 2023, opening the scoring in a league match against Club Brugge. However, Charleroi went on to lose the match 4–2.

On 26 August 2026, Guaiagon moved to Al Taawoun in Saudi Arabia.

== International career ==
On 11 June 2025, Guiagon made his senior debut for the Ivory Coast national team in a friendly against Canada. He started the match as Ivory Coast won following a penalty shoot-out.

On 15 May 2026, Guiagon was named in Emerse Faé's 26-man Ivory Coast squad for the 2026 FIFA World Cup.

== Career statistics ==
=== Club ===
As of 1 June 2023

Appearances and goals by club, season and competition
Club	Season	League			National cup		League cup		Continental		Other		Total	
Club	Season	Division	Apps	Goals	Apps	Goals	Apps	Goals	Apps	Goals	Apps	Goals	Apps	Goals
Maccabi Tel Aviv	2019–20	Israeli Premier League	3	0	0	0	0	0	–		0	0	3	0
Maccabi Tel Aviv	2022–23	Israeli Premier League	32	4	2	0	2	1	–		0	0	36	5
Maccabi Tel Aviv	Total		35	4	2	0	2	1	0	0	0	0	39	5
Beitar Tel Aviv Bat Yam (loan)	2020–21	Liga Leumit	26	4	4	2	0	0	–		0	0	30	6
Maccabi Netanya (loan)	2021–22	Israeli Premier League	28	5	1	0	0	0	–		0	0	29	5
Charleroi	2023–24	Belgian Pro League	0	0	0	0	0	0	–		0	0	0	0
Career total			89	13	7	2	2	1	0	0	0	0	98	16
