= Youssuf Sylla =

Belgian footballer (born 2002)

Personal information
- Date of birth: 19 December 2002 (age 23)
- Place of birth: Grimbergen, Belgium
- Height: 1.91 m (6 ft 3 in)
- Position: Centre forward

Team information
- Current team: Jagiellonia Białystok
- Number: 17

Youth career
- KFC Strombeek
- 2010–2011: KVK Wemmel
- 2011–2012: KSC Grimbergen
- 2012–2013: Woluwe-Zaventem
- 2013–2015: Lierse
- 2015–2019: Standard Liège
- 2019–2020: Torino
- 2020–2021: Zulte Waregem

Senior career*
Years	Team	Apps	(Gls)
2021–2023	Zulte Waregem	4	(0)
2022–2023	Jong Essevee	29	(22)
2023–2024	Zébra Élites	15	(3)
2023–2025	Charleroi	34	(3)
2025	→ Willem II (loan)	12	(0)
2025–	Jagiellonia Białystok	11	(2)
2025–	Jagiellonia Białystok II	6	(2)

International career
2023–2024	Belgium U21	11	(1)
- * Club domestic league appearances and goals as of 18:51, 20 September 2026 (UTC)

Youssuf Sylla (born 19 December 2002) is a Belgian professional footballer who plays as a centre forward for Ekstraklasa club Jagiellonia Białystok.

== Club career ==
On 30 August 2023, Sylla signed a two-year contract with Charleroi and was initially assigned to their reserve team Zébra Élites.

On 5 January 2025, Sylla joined Eredivisie side Willem II on loan for the remainder of the season with the option to buy.

On 29 August 2025, Sylla moved on a free transfer to Ekstraklasa club Jagiellonia Białystok on a three-year deal, with Charleroi retaining a percentage of a future sale.

== Personal life ==
Sylla is the son of the Guinean footballer Atiebou Sympa.
