= Antoine Bernier =

Belgian footballer

Personal information
- Date of birth: 10 September 1997 (age 29)
- Place of birth: Dinant, Belgium
- Height: 1.71 m (5 ft 7 in)
- Position: Winger

Team information
- Current team: Charleroi
- Number: 17

Youth career
- –2013: RCS Onhaye

Senior career*
Years	Team	Apps	(Gls)
2013–2014	RCS Onhaye		
2014–2018	Anderlecht	0	(0)
2018–2020	Antwerp	0	(0)
2019	→ Lierse (loan)	14	(5)
2019–2020	→ Dudelange (loan)	14	(1)
2020–2023	RFC Seraing	77	(9)
2023–	Charleroi	103	(17)
- * Club domestic league appearances and goals as of 1 June 2026

Antoine Bernier (born 10 September 1997) is a Belgian professional footballer who plays as a winger for Charleroi.

== Career ==
Bernier, born in Dinant, began his career at RSC Onhaye in Belgium's fourth tier, making his debut aged 16. In 2014 he made a significant move to RSC Anderlecht's youth and signed his first professional contract with the club two years later, in May 2016. However, his time with Anderlecht came to an end in June 2018, leading him to join Royal Antwerp. In January 2019, he embarked on a loan with Lierse SK until the end of the season. The following summer, he joined F91 Dudelange on a season-long loan. In the summer of 2020, he joined RFC Seraing on a permanent basis. In his debut season at the club he achieved promotion to the Belgian First Division A . In July 2021, Bernier made a commitment to RFC Seraing by extending his contract for an additional two seasons.

On 23 June 2023, Bernier signed a three-year contract with Charleroi.

== Personal life ==
Bernier is the younger brother of fellow footballer Florent Bernier.
