= 2022–23 KV Kortrijk season =

K.V. Kortrijk
2022–23 season
- Owner: Vincent Tan
- Chairman: Ronny Verhelst
- Manager: Karim Belhocine (until 29 August); Adnan Čustović (from 1 September until 14 November); Bernd Storck (from 18 November)
- Stadium: Guldensporen Stadion
- Belgian Pro League: 14th
- Belgian Cup: Quarter-finals
- Top goalscorer: League: Faïz Selemani (4); All: Massimo Bruno; Faïz Selemani (4 each)

The 2022–23 K.V. Kortrijk season was the club's 122nd season in existence and the 15th consecutive season in the top flight of Belgian football. In addition to the domestic league, Kortrijk participated in this season's edition of the Belgian Cup. The season covered the period from 1 July 2022 to 30 June 2023.

== Players ==
=== First-team squad ===
As of 1 October 2022

Note: Flags indicate national team as defined under FIFA eligibility rules; some limited exceptions apply. Players may hold more than one non-FIFA nationality.

No.	Pos.	Nation	Player
1	GK	BEL	Tom Vandenberghe
4	DF	JPN	Tsuyoshi Watanabe
5	DF	GER	Christalino Atemona
6	DF	UKR	Oleksiy Sych (on loan from Rukh Lviv)
7	FW	BEL	Dylan Mbayo
9	FW	ALG	Billel Messaoudi
10	FW	COM	Faïz Selemani
11	MF	BEL	Amine Benchaib
12	MF	MLI	Habib Keïta (on loan from Lyon)
16	GK	BEL	Maxim Deman
17	FW	SEN	Pape Habib Guèye
18	MF	ALG	Abdelkahar Kadri
20	FW	URU	Felipe Avenatti
21	DF	BEL	Martin Wasinski (on loan from Charleroi)
22	FW	CMR	Didier Lamkel Zé

No.	Pos.	Nation	Player
23	MF	BEL	Dion De Neve
24	DF	BEL	Dorian Dessoleil (on loan from Antwerp)
25	DF	CHI	Nayel Mehssatou
26	MF	FRA	Kévin Vandendriessche
28	GK	FRA	Joris Delle
29	FW	SVK	Martin Regáli
30	DF	BEL	Kristof D'haene (captain)
31	GK	SRB	Marko Ilić
32	MF	JPN	Satoshi Tanaka (on loan from Shonan Bellmare)
33	MF	BIH	Stjepan Lončar (on loan from Ferencváros)
44	DF	POR	João Silva
51	FW	GHA	Eric Ocansey
54	FW	GHA	Jonah Osabutey
70	FW	BEL	Massimo Bruno
77	FW	TOG	David Henen

=== Out on loan ===
Note: Flags indicate national team as defined under FIFA eligibility rules; some limited exceptions apply. Players may hold more than one non-FIFA nationality.

No.	Pos.	Nation	Player
—	DF	SRB	Aleksandar Radovanović (at Austin FC until 30 June 2023)
—	MF	BEL	Youssef Challouk (at RWDM47 until 30 June 2023)
—	MF	MLI	Sambou Sissoko (at Čukarički until 30 June 2023)
—	MF	BEL	Alexandre De Bruyn (at Dender EH until 30 June 2023)

No.	Pos.	Nation	Player
—	FW	GAM	Muhammed Badamosi (at Čukarički until 30 June 2023)
—	FW	GER	Jesaja Herrmann (at NAC Breda until 30 June 2023)
—	FW	MAS	Luqman Hakim Shamsudin (at Njarðvík until 30 June 2023)

== Transfers ==
=== In ===
Pos	Player	Transferred from	Fee	Date	Source
GK	Tom Vandenberghe	Deinze	Free	9 February 2022	
MF	Youssef Challouk	Deinze	Free	15 February 2022	
DF	Dion De Neve	Zulte Waregem	Free	4 April 2022	
DF	(Georgia (country)) Jemal Tabidze	Unattached	Free	11 June 2022	
MF	(Mali) Habib Keïta	(France) Lyon	Loan	25 June 2022	
MF	Massimo Bruno	(Turkey) Bursaspor	Free	29 June 2022	
DF	(Portugal) João Silva	(Spain) Alavés	Free	15 July 2022	
DF	Dorian Dessoleil	Antwerp	Loan	27 July 2022	
FW	(Uruguay) Felipe Avenatti	Standard Liège	Free	18 August 2022	
FW	(Cameroon) Didier Lamkel Zé	Antwerp	Undisclosed	23 August 2022	
MF	(Japan) Satoshi Tanaka	(Japan) Shonan Bellmare	Loan	24 August 2022	
DF	(Ukraine) Oleksiy Sych	(Ukraine) Rukh Lviv	Loan	6 September 2022	
MF	(Bosnia and Herzegovina) Stjepan Lončar	(Hungary) Ferencváros	Loan	6 September 2022	
FW	(Slovakia) Martin Regáli	(Slovakia) Ružomberok	Undisclosed	3 January 2023	
DF	(Germany) Christalino Atemona	(Germany) Hertha Berlin	Undisclosed	3 January 2023	
DF	Martin Wasinski	Charleroi	Loan	6 January 2023	
FW	(Cameroon) Didier Lamkel Zé	(Morocco) Wydad	End of loan	8 April 2023	

=== Out ===
Pos	Player	Transferred to	Fee	Date	Source
MF	(Georgia (country)) Tsotne Bendianishvili	Unattached	End of contract	13 June 2022	
DF	(Australia) Trent Sainsbury	Unattached	End of contract	13 June 2022	
MF	Michiel Jonckheere	Unattached	End of contract	13 June 2022	
DF	(United States) Bryan Reynolds	(Italy) Roma	End of loan	13 June 2022	
MF	(Croatia) Ante Palaversa	(England) Manchester City	End of loan	13 June 2022	
MF	(Denmark) Victor Torp	(Denmark) Midtjylland	End of loan	13 June 2022	
FW	(Morocco) Rachid Alioui	(France) Angers	End of loan	13 June 2022	
FW	(Colombia) Marlos Moreno	(England) Manchester City	End of loan	13 June 2022	
DF	(France) Lucas Rougeaux	Unattached	End of contract	30 June 2022	
FW	(The Gambia) Muhammed Badamosi	(Serbia) Čukarički	Loan	1 July 2022	
FW	(Germany) Jesaja Herrmann	(Netherlands) NAC Breda	Loan	14 July 2022	
DF	(Georgia (country)) Jemal Tabidze	(Georgia (country)) Dinamo Tbilisi	Mutual contract termination	15 July 2022	
MF	Youssef Challouk	RWDM47	Loan	7 September 2022	
MF	(Mali) Sambou Sissoko	(Serbia) Čukarički	Loan	15 September 2022	
FW	(Cameroon) Didier Lamkel Zé	(Morocco) Wydad	Loan	12 January 2023	
MF	Alexandre De Bruyn	Dender EH	Loan	17 January 2023	
FW	(Malaysia) Luqman Hakim Shamsudin	(Iceland) Njarðvík	Loan	7 February 2023	
DF	(Serbia) Aleksandar Radovanović	(United States) Austin FC	Loan	22 March 2023	

== Pre-season and friendlies ==
Win Draw Loss Fixtures

17 June 2022	Heule (Belgium)	0–7	(Belgium) Kortrijk	Kortrijk, Belgium
19:00		Report	Messaoudi 53'; De Meulenaere 59'; Herrmann 65'; A. Desot 75'; Watanabe 86'; J. Desot 88'; Benchaib 90'	Stadium: Kouterveld

25 June 2022	Kortrijk (Belgium)	3–1	(Belgium) Mechelen	Kortrijk, Belgium
15:30	Guèye 10', 41'; Henen 35'	Report	Malede 75'	Stadium: Guldensporen Stadion

2 July 2022	Dordrecht (Netherlands)	4–2	(Belgium) Kortrijk	Dordrecht, Netherlands
14:00	Savastano 7'; Pinas 14'; Meijer 23'; Schuurman 78'	Report	Mbayo 13'; Keïta 83'

8 July 2022	Beveren (Belgium)	Cancelled	(Belgium) Kortrijk	Kallo, Belgium
		Cancellation

9 July 2022	Kortrijk (Belgium)	0–0	(Belgium) Virton	Harelbeke, Belgium
17:00		Report		Stadium: Forestier Stadium

15 July 2022	Oostende (Belgium)	4–5	(Belgium) Kortrijk	Ostend, Belgium
	Albanese 14'; Sissoko 30' (o.g.); Kvasina 61'; Berte 63'	Report	Henen 8', 18'; ? 57'; ? 74'; ? 90'	Stadium: Diaz Arena

16 July 2022	Kortrijk (Belgium)	2–1	(Netherlands) Utrecht	Kortrijk, Belgium
16:00	Benchaib 35'; Guèye 81'	Report	Boussaid 78'	Stadium: Guldensporen Stadion

4 December 2022	Kortrijk (Belgium)	1–0	(Netherlands) Excelsior	Kortrijk, Belgium
12:00	Mehssatou 72'	Report		Stadium: Guldensporen Stadion

10 December 2022	Kortrijk (Belgium)	2–3	(Belgium) Cercle Brugge	Mouscron, Belgium
13:30	Kadri 37'; Mbayo 92'	Report	Hotić 29' (pen.); Decostere 90'; Ueda 118'	Stadium: Stade Le Canonnier; Attendance: 0 (behind closed doors)
Note: The match was played over 120 minutes

14 December 2022	Antwerp (Belgium)	2–0	(Belgium) Kortrijk	Antwerp, Belgium
13:00	Ekkelenkamp 55'; Bataille 89'	Report		Stadium: Bosuilstadion; Attendance: 0 (behind closed doors)

6 January 2023	Kortrijk (Belgium)	1–2	(Belgium) Westhoek	Kortrijk, Belgium
19:30		Report		Stadium: KV Kortrijk Jeugdcomplex Stade

== Competitions ==
=== Overview ===
Competition	First match	Last match	Starting round	Final position	Record							
Competition	First match	Last match	Starting round	Final position	Pld	W	D	L	GF	GA	GD	Win %
Belgian Pro League	23 July 2022	23 April 2023	Matchday 1	14th	34	8	7	19	37	61	−24	23.53
Belgian Cup	10 November 2022	11 January 2023	Sixth round	Quarter-finals	3	2	0	1	6	3	+3	66.67
Total					37	10	7	20	43	64	−21	27.03

Last updated: 13 July 2023
Source: Soccerway

=== Belgian Pro League ===
==== League table ====
Pos	Team	Pld	W	D	L	GF	GA	GD	Pts	Qualification or relegation
12	Sint-Truiden	34	11	9	14	37	40	−3	42	
13	Mechelen	34	11	7	16	49	63	−14	40	
14	Kortrijk	34	8	7	19	37	61	−24	31	
15	Eupen	34	7	7	20	40	75	−35	28	
16	Oostende (R)	34	7	6	21	37	76	−39	27	Relegation to Challenger Pro League

Source: Jupiler Pro League (in Dutch), Soccerway
Rules for classification: 1) Points; 2) Matches won; 3) Goal difference; 4) Goals scored; 5) Away matches won; 6) Away goal difference; 7) Away goals scored; 8) Play-off.
(R) Relegated

==== Results summary ====
Overall								Home						Away					
Pld	W	D	L	GF	GA	GD	Pts	W	D	L	GF	GA	GD	W	D	L	GF	GA	GD
34	8	7	19	37	61	−24	31	4	5	8	16	29	−13	4	2	11	21	32	−11

Last updated: 25 July 2023.
Source: Jupiler Pro League

==== Results by round ====
Round	1	2	3	4	5	6	7	8	9	10	11	12	13	14	15	16	17	18	19	20	21	22	23	24	25	26	27	28	29	30	31	32	33	34
Ground	H	A	H	A	A	H	A	H	A	H	A	H	A	H	H	A	H	H	A	A	H	A	H	A	A	H	A	H	A	H	A	H	A	H
Result	L	W	D	L	L	L	W	L	L	W	L	L	D	L	D	L	L	W	W	L	W	L	D	L	W	D	D	L	L	W	L	D	L	L
Position	14	13	10	14	13	17	12	14	14	14	15	16	16	17	16	16	17	16	15	15	14	14	14	15	15	14	14	14	15	14	14	14	14	14

Updated to match(es) played on 23 April 2023. Source: Jupiler Pro League
A = Away; H = Home; W = Win; D = Draw; L = Loss

==== Matches ====
The league fixtures were announced on 22 June 2022.

23 July 2022 1	Kortrijk	0–2	OH Leuven	Kortrijk
18:15		Report	Maertens 72'; Al-Taamari 90+3'	Stadium: Guldensporen Stadion; Referee: Lothar D'hondt

31 July 2022 2	Seraing	0–1	Kortrijk	Seraing
18:30		Report	Watanabe 58'	Stadium: Stade du Pairay; Referee: Jonathan Lardot

6 August 2022 3	Kortrijk	0–0	Sint-Truiden	Kortrijk
18:15		Report		Stadium: Guldensporen Stadion; Referee: Wesli De Cremer

13 August 2022 4	Union SG	2–1	Kortrijk	Brussels
20:45	Teuma 9' (pen.), 58'	Report	Selemani 63'	Stadium: Joseph Marien Stadium; Referee: Alexandre Boucaut

21 August 2022 5	Club Brugge	2–1	Kortrijk	Bruges
13:30	Jutglà 4'; Meijer 45+3'	Report	Guèye 33'	Stadium: Jan Breydel Stadium; Referee: Jan Boterberg

28 August 2022 6	Kortrijk	0–1	Standard Liège	Kortrijk
16:00		Report	Amallah 83'	Stadium: Guldensporen Stadion; Referee: Lothar D'hondt

3 September 2022 7	Eupen	0–1	Kortrijk	Eupen
18:15 CEST		Report	Mbayo 81'	Stadium: Kehrwegstadion; Referee: Bert Put

10 September 2022 8	Kortrijk	1–4	Mechelen	Kortrijk
16:00	Lamkel Zé 63' (pen.)	Report	Walsh 37'; Schoofs 41', 90+3'; Hairemans 53'	Stadium: Guldensporen Stadion; Referee: Nicolas Laforge

18 September 2022 9	Anderlecht	4–1	Kortrijk	Anderlecht
21:00	Verschaeren 27'; Ashimeru 59'; Vertonghen 64'; Refaelov 75' (pen.)	Report	Selemani 61'	Stadium: Lotto Park; Referee: Nathan Verboomen

2 October 2022 10	Kortrijk	2–1	Antwerp	Kortrijk
18:30	Avenatti 21'; Selemani 42'	Report	Janssen 90+2' (pen.)	Stadium: Guldensporen Stadion; Referee: Bram Van Driessche

8 October 2022 11	Genk	2–1	Kortrijk	Genk
16:00 CEST	Onuachu 37', 79' (pen.)	Report	Selemani 58'	Stadium: Cegeka Arena; Attendance: 15,108; Referee: Jonathan Lardot

15 October 2022 12	Kortrijk	1–3	Zulte Waregem	Kortrijk
16:00	Keïta 25'	Report	Tambedou 60'; Offor 65'; Gano 87' (pen.)	Stadium: Guldensporen Stadion; Referee: Bert Put

18 October 2022 13	Charleroi	2–2	Kortrijk	Charleroi
18:30 CEST	Heymans 27'; Ilaimaharitra 42'	Report	Guèye 52'; Avenatti 87'	Stadium: Stade du Pays de Charleroi; Referee: Brent Staessens

22 October 2022 14	Kortrijk	0–2	Westerlo	Kortrijk
16:00		Report	Madsen 48'; Nene 83'	Stadium: Guldensporen Stadion; Referee: Wim Smet

29 October 2022 15	Kortrijk	1–1	Cercle Brugge	Kortrijk
18:15 CEST	Messaoudi 79'	Report	Popović 9'	Stadium: Guldensporen Stadion; Referee: Lothar D'hondt

6 November 2022 16	Oostende	3–1	Kortrijk	Ostend
21:00	Hornby 8'; McGeehan 54', 90+6'	Report	Bruno 19'	Stadium: Diaz Arena; Referee: Wim Smet

13 November 2022 17	Kortrijk	0–4	Gent	Kortrijk
21 :00		Report	Hjulsager 33'; Salah 40', 71'; Depoitre 69'	Stadium: Guldensporen Stadion; Referee: Bert Put

26 December 2022 18	Kortrijk	1–0	Genk	Kortrijk
19:15 CEST	Avenatti 83'	Report		Stadium: Guldensporen Stadion; Referee: Kevin Van Damme

8 January 2023 19	OH Leuven	2–3	Kortrijk	Leuven
21:00	Al-Taamari 9'; Patris 76'	Report	Avenatti 43', 92'; Sych 51'	Stadium: Den Dreef; Referee: Jan Boterberg

15 January 2023 20	Gent	2–1	Kortrijk	Ghent
16:00	Cuypers 7', 69'	Report	Bruno 74'	Stadium: Ghelamco Arena; Referee: Bert Put

18 January 2023 21	Kortrijk	3–2	Seraing	Kortrijk
20:45	Avenatti 9'; Messaoudi 23'; Selemani 63'	Report	Vagner 18' (pen.), 60'	Stadium: Guldensporen Stadion; Referee: Brent Staessens

21 January 2023 22	Mechelen	3–2	Kortrijk	Mechelen
18:15	Storm 37'; Mrabti 45+2'; Ngoy 73'	Report	De Neve 33'; Kadri 57'	Stadium: Achter de Kazerne; Referee: Arthur Denil

28 January 2023 23	Kortrijk	2–2	Oostende	Kortrijk
18:15	Selemani 20'; Guèye 89'	Report	Bätzner 45+5'; Ambrose 84'	Stadium: Guldensporen Stadion; Referee: Alexandre Boucaut

4 February 2023 24	Sint-Truiden	1–0	Kortrijk	Sint-Truiden
20:45	Vandenberghe 45+4' (o.g.)	Report		Stadium: Stayen; Referee: Jasper Vergoote

12 February 2023 25	Standard Liège	0–2	Kortrijk	Liège
18:30		Report	Wasinski 67'; Selemani 84' (pen.)	Stadium: Stade Maurice Dufrasne; Referee: Lothar D'hondt

19 February 2023 26	Kortrijk	2–2	Anderlecht	Kortrijk
18:30	Kadri 57'; Silva 67'	Report	Dreyer 41'; Murillo 83'	Stadium: Guldensporen Stadion; Referee: Nathan Verboomen

24 February 2023 27	Zulte Waregem	3–3	Kortrijk	Waregem
20:45	Ciranni 30'; Ndour 49'; Gano 83'	Report	Kadri 15'; Selemani 44'; Avenatti 65'	Stadium: Elindus Arena; Referee: Lawrence Visser

4 March 2023 28	Kortrijk	0–1	Charleroi	Kortrijk
16:00 CEST		Report	Badji 73'	Stadium: Guldensporen Stadion; Referee: Nicolas Laforge

11 March 2023 29	Westerlo	3–1	Kortrijk	Westerlo
18:15	Watanabe 45+4' (o.g.); Vaesen 60', 73'	Report	Bruno 63'	Stadium: Het Kuipje; Referee: Wesli De Cremer

18 March 2023 30	Kortrijk	1–0	Club Brugge	Kortrijk
16:00	Kadri 31'	Report		Stadium: Guldensporen Stadion; Referee: Bram Van Driessche

1 April 2023 31	Cercle Brugge	2–0	Kortrijk	Bruges
16:00 CEST	Somers 16'; Ueda 36' (pen.)	Report		Stadium: Jan Breydel Stadium; Referee: Nathan Verboomen

8 April 2023 32	Kortrijk	0–0	Eupen	Kortrijk
16:00 CEST		Report		Stadium: Guldensporen Stadion; Referee: Jonathan Lardot

16 April 2023 33	Antwerp	1–0	Kortrijk	Antwerp
18:30	Muja 70'	Report		Stadium: Bosuilstadion; Referee: Jan Boterberg

23 April 2023 34	Kortrijk	2–4	Union SG	Kortrijk
18:30	Silva 24'; D'haene 38'	Report	Terho 16', 72'; Watanabe 67' (o.g.); Adingra 84'	Stadium: Guldensporen Stadion; Referee: Wesli De Cremer

=== Belgian Cup ===
10 November 2022 Sixth round	RWDM	1–3	Kortrijk	Brussels
20:00 CET	Botella 55'	Report	Bruno 69', 84'; Messaoudi 90+3'	Stadium: Edmond Machtens Stadium; Referee: Arthur Denil

20 December 2022 Seventh round	OH Leuven	1–3	Kortrijk	Leuven
20:00 CET	González 90+5'	Report	Bruno 55'; Keïta 82'; Avenatti 87'	Stadium: Den Dreef; Referee: Jasper Vergoote

11 January 2023 Quarter-final	Kortrijk	0–1	Mechelen	Kortrijk
18:30 CET		Report	Walsh 90+1'	Stadium: Guldensporen Stadion; Referee: Jasper Vergoote
