= 2023–24 KV Kortrijk season =

K.V. Kortrijk
2023–24 season
- Manager: Edward Still (until 25 September); Glen De Boeck (from 2 October until 5 December); Joseph Akpala (caretaker); Freyr Alexandersson (from 6 January)
- Stadium: Guldensporen Stadion
- Belgian Pro League: 15th
- Relegation play-offs: 2nd
- Belgian Cup: Eighth round
- Top goalscorer: League: Isaak Davies (9); All: Isaak Davies (9)
- Average home league attendance: 6,588
- Biggest win: Kortrijk 4–2 Lommel
- Biggest defeat: Antwerp 6–0 Kortrijk

The 2023–24 season was K.V. Kortrijk's 123rd season in existence and 16th consecutive in the Belgian Pro League. They also competed in the Belgian Cup.

== Players ==
=== First-team squad ===
As of 29 December 2023

Note: Flags indicate national team as defined under FIFA eligibility rules; some limited exceptions apply. Players may hold more than one non-FIFA nationality.

No.	Pos.	Nation	Player
1	GK	BEL	Tom Vandenberghe
2	DF	ENG	Ryan Alebiosu
4	DF	UKR	Mark Mampassi (on loan from Lokomotiv Moscow)
5	DF	GER	Christalino Atemona
6	DF	CHI	Nayel Mehssatou
7	FW	BEL	Dylan Mbayo
8	MF	BEL	Youssef Challouk
9	FW	IRL	Jonathan Afolabi
10	MF	ALG	Abdelkahar Kadri
11	MF	BEL	Dion De Neve
13	GK	BEL	Ebbe De Vlaeminck
15	MF	BUL	Kristiyan Malinov
16	MF	BEL	Marco Kana (on loan from Anderlecht)
20	FW	URU	Felipe Avenatti
21	DF	BEL	Martin Wasinski (on loan from Charleroi)
23	FW	ENG	Alex Mighten (on loan from Nottingham Forest)

No.	Pos.	Nation	Player
27	MF	FRA	Abdoulaye Sissako
29	FW	SVK	Martin Regáli
39	FW	WAL	Isaak Davies (on loan from Cardiff City)
44	DF	POR	João Silva
54	FW	ENG	Sheyi Ojo (on loan from Cardiff City)
66	DF	SRB	Aleksandar Radovanović
68	FW	GLP	Thierry Ambrose
70	MF	BEL	Massimo Bruno
76	FW	SEN	Djibi Seck
77	FW	TOG	David Henen
89	MF	BEL	Lynnt Audoor (on loan from Club Brugge)
95	GK	BEL	Lucas Pirard
98	DF	ROU	Raul Opruț
99	FW	FRA	Mounaïm El Idrissy

=== Out on loan ===
Note: Flags indicate national team as defined under FIFA eligibility rules; some limited exceptions apply. Players may hold more than one non-FIFA nationality.

No.	Pos.	Nation	Player
—	MF	BEL	Massimo Decoene (at Oostende until 30 June 2024)
—	FW	ALG	Billel Messaoudi (at Göztepe until 30 June 2024)

No.	Pos.	Nation	Player
—	FW	MAS	Luqman Hakim Shamsudin (at Njarðvík until 31 December 2023)

== Transfers ==
=== In ===
Pos.	Player	Transferred from	Fee	Date	Source
DF	(Romania) Raul Opruț	(Romania) FC Hermannstadt	€400,000	31 July 2023	
MF	(England) Sheyi Ojo	(Wales) Cardiff City	Loan	16 August 2023	
MF	(Bulgaria) Kristiyan Malinov	(Belgium) OH Leuven	Free	18 August 2023	
MF	(Belgium) Marco Kana	(Belgium) Anderlecht	Loan	1 September 2023	
DF	(Northern Ireland) Craig Cathcart	(England) Watford	Free	5 September 2023	
MF	(England) Alex Mighten	(England) Nottingham Forest	Loan	5 September 2023	
FW	(Morocco) Mounaïm El Idrissy	(France) Ajaccio		6 September 2023	
FW	(Republic of Ireland) Jonathan Afolabi	(Republic of Ireland) Bohemians	Undisclosed	29 December 2023	
DF	(Japan) Haruya Fujii	(Japan) Nagoya Grampus	Loan	10 January 2024	
DF	(Japan) Ryotaro Tsunoda	(Wales) Cardiff City	Loan	23 January 2024	
MF	(Zambia) Kings Kangwa	(Serbia) Red Star Belgrade	Loan	1 February 2024	

=== Out ===
Pos.	Player	Transferred to	Fee	Date	Source
FW	(Algeria) Billel Messaoudi	(Turkey) Göztepe	Loan	14 August 2023	
DF	(Northern Ireland) Craig Cathcart	Retired		19 September 2023	
DF	(Romania) Raul Opruț	(Romania) FC Hermannstadt	Loan	8 January 2024	
MF	(England) Alex Mighten	(England) Nottingham Forest	Loan return	9 January 2024	
FW	(Malaysia) Luqman Hakim Shamsudin	(Japan) YSCC Yokohama	Loan	16 January 2024	
DF	(Serbia) Aleksandar Radovanović	(Spain) Almería	Free	20 January 2024	

== Pre-season and friendlies ==
Win Draw Loss

17 June 2023 Friendly	KE Wervik (Belgium)	2–1	(Belgium) Kortrijk	Wervik
17:00				Stadium: Sportcentrum Virovios Terrein 1

24 June 2023 Friendly	KRC Harelbeke (Belgium)	2–6	(Belgium) Kortrijk	Harelbeke
17:00				Stadium: Forestiersstadion

28 June 2023 Friendly	Oudenaarde (Belgium)	2–4	(Belgium) Kortrijk	Oudenaarde
19:00				Stadium: Burgemeester Thienpontstadion

1 July 2023 Friendly	Kortrijk (Belgium)	0–2	(Belgium) SK Beveren	Kortrijk
17:00				Stadium: Guldensporenstadion

5 July 2023 Friendly	Kortrijk (Belgium)	2–1	(Belgium) RWDM	Harelbeke
19:00				Stadium: Forestiersstadion

8 July 2023 Friendly	RKC Waalwijk (Netherlands)	0–0	(Belgium) Kortrijk	Waalwijk, Netherlands
14:00				Stadium: Sportpark Olympia Waalwijk

14 July 2023 Friendly	Beerschot (Belgium)	1–0	(Belgium) Kortrijk
19:00

22 July 2023 Friendly	Kortrijk (Belgium)	2–1	(Netherlands) Volendam	Kortrijk
15:00				Stadium: Guldensporenstadion

== Competitions ==
=== Overall record ===
Competition	First match	Last match	Starting round	Final position	Record							
Competition	First match	Last match	Starting round	Final position	Pld	W	D	L	GF	GA	GD	Win %
Belgian Pro League regular season	30 July 2023	16 March 2024	Matchday 1	15th	30	6	6	18	22	57	−35	20.00
Relegation play-offs	7 April 2024	11 May 2024	Matchday 1	2nd	6	2	1	3	7	10	−3	33.33
Promotion/relegation play-offs	19 May 2024		First leg	Winners	2	2	0	0	5	2	+3	100.00
Belgian Cup	1 November 2023		Seventh round	Eighth round	2	0	1	1	1	2	−1	0.00
Total					40	10	8	22	35	71	−36	25.00

Source: Soccerway

=== Belgian Pro League ===
==== Regular season ====
Pos	Team	Pld	W	D	L	GF	GA	GD	Pts	Qualification or relegation
12	OH Leuven	30	7	8	15	34	47	−13	29	Qualification for the Europe play-offs
13	Charleroi	30	7	8	15	26	48	−22	29	Qualification for the relegation play-offs
14	Eupen	30	7	3	20	24	58	−34	24	Qualification for the relegation play-offs
15	Kortrijk	30	6	6	18	22	57	−35	24	Qualification for the relegation play-offs
16	RWD Molenbeek	30	5	8	17	31	67	−36	23	Qualification for the relegation play-offs

Source: Jupiler Pro League (in Dutch), Soccerway
Rules for classification: 1) Points; 2) Matches won; 3) Goal difference; 4) Goals scored; 5) Away matches won; 6) Away goal difference; 7) Away goals scored; 8) Play-off.

==== Results summary ====
Overall								Home						Away					
Pld	W	D	L	GF	GA	GD	Pts	W	D	L	GF	GA	GD	W	D	L	GF	GA	GD
30	6	6	18	22	57	−35	24	4	3	8	13	24	−11	2	3	10	9	33	−24

Source: Worldfootball

==== Results by round ====
Round	1	2	3	4	5	6	7	8	9	10	11	12	13	14	15	16	17	18	19	20	21	22	23	24	25	26	27	28	29	30
Ground	A	H	A	H	H	A	H	A	H	A	H	H	A	A	H	A	H	A	A	H	A	H	A	H	A	H	A	H	H	A
Result	L	L	L	L	D	L	D	L	W	L	W	L	D	L	L	D	L	L	L	L	W	D	D	W	L	L	L	W	L	W
Position	12	15	16	16	16	16	15	16	15	16	15	15	16	16	16	16	16	16	16	16	16	16	16	16	16	16	16	16	16	15

Source: Worldfootball
A = Away; H = Home; W = Win; D = Draw; L = Loss

==== Matches ====
The league fixtures were unveiled on 22 June 2023.

30 July 2023 1	Gent	3–2	Kortrijk	Ghent
16:00	Radovanović 8' (o.g.); Castro-Montes (yellow card) 24'; Cuypers 30'; Orban 71'	Report	Kadri 5'; Montegnies (yellow card) 30'; Mehssatou (yellow card) 56'; Avenatti (yellow card) 40', (goal) 86'; João Silva (yellow card) 90+5'	Stadium: Ghelamco Arena; Attendance: 12,595; Referee: Lawrence Visser

6 August 2023 2	Kortrijk	0–1	Sint-Truiden	Kortrijk
19:15				Stadium: Guldensporen Stadion

11 August 2023 3	Antwerp	6–0	Kortrijk	Antwerp
20:45				Stadium: Den Dreef

20 August 2023 4	Kortrijk	1–3	Eupen	Kortrijk
19:15 CEST (UTC+2)	Wasinski (yellow card) 49'; Audoor (yellow card) 54'; Malinov (yellow card) 65'; Kadri 66'; João Silva (yellow card) 80'; Mehssatou (yellow card) 90+2'; Avenatti (red card) 90+9'	Report	Paeshuyse (yellow card) 53'; Magnée 56'; Keita 60', (yellow card) 67'; Král (yellow card) 90+5'; Slonina (yellow card) 90+9'; Déom 90+11'	Stadium: Guldensporen Stadion; Attendance: 4,419; Referee: Arthur Denil

26 August 2023 5	Kortrijk	1–1	Standard Liège	Kortrijk
20:45				Stadium: Guldensporen Stadion

1 September 2023 6	OH Leuven	3–0	Kortrijk	Leuven
20:45				Stadium: Den Dreef

17 September 2023 7	Kortrijk	2–2	Anderlecht	Kortrijk
16:00				Stadium: Guldensporen Stadion

23 September 2023 8	Charleroi	1–0	Kortrijk	Charleroi
16:00				Stadium: Stade du Pays de Charleroi

29 September 2023 9	Kortrijk	2–1	Cercle Brugge	Kortrijk
20:45		Report		Stadium: Guldensporen Stadion; Referee: Erik Lambrechts

7 October 2023 10	Westerlo	1–0	Kortrijk	Westerlo
18:15		Report		Stadium: Het Kuipje; Referee: Nathan Verboomen

29 October 2023 11	Kortrijk	1–0	Club Brugge	Kortrijk
16:00				Stadium: Guldensporen Stadion

29 October 2023 12	Kortrijk	0–3	Genk	Kortrijk
19:15		Report		Stadium: Guldensporen Stadion

4 November 2023 13	RWD Molenbeek	1–1	Kortrijk	Molenbeek-Saint-Jean
16:00		Report		Stadium: Edmond Machtens Stadium

12 November 2023 14	Union Saint-Gilloise	3–0	Kortrijk	Brussels
19:15		Report		Stadium: Joseph Marien Stadium

26 November 2023 15	Kortrijk	0–3	Mechelen	Kortrijk
19:15		Report	Bassette 6'; Schoofs 16'; Mrabti 79'	Stadium: Guldensporen Stadion

2 December 2023 16	Eupen	1–1	Kortrijk	Eupen
18:15	Pálsson 69'	Report	Vandenberghe 90+3'	Stadium: Kehrwegstadion

8 December 2023 17	Kortrijk	1–2	Westerlo	Kortrijk
20:45	Davies 66'	Report	Frigan 33'; Daci 87'	Stadium: Guldensporen Stadion; Referee: Brent Staessens

17 December 2023 18	Genk	4–0	Kortrijk	Genk
19:15		Report		Stadium: Cegeka Arena; Referee: Bram Van Driessche

20 December 2023 19	Cercle Brugge	3–2	Kortrijk	Bruges
18:30		Report		Stadium: Jan Breydel Stadium; Referee: Wim Smet

26 December 2023 20	Kortrijk	0–2	Gent	Kortrijk
16:00			Tissoudali 7', 56'	Stadium: Guldensporen Stadion; Referee: Jan Boterberg

20 January 2024 21	Standard Liège	0–1	Kortrijk	Liège
18:15		Report	Avenatti 45'	Stadium: Stade Maurice Dufrasne; Referee: Bert Put

27 January 2024 22	Kortrijk	0–0	OH Leuven	Kortrijk
16:00		Report		Stadium: Guldensporen Stadion; Referee: Nicolas Laforge

30 January 2024 23	Club Brugge	3–3	Kortrijk	Bruges
20:30 CET (UTC+1)	Zinckernagel 16'; Mechele 77'; Thiago 86'	Report	Afolabi 53'; Bruno 68'; Seck 90+7'	Stadium: Jan Breydel Stadium; Referee: Jonathan Lardot

3 February 2024 24	Kortrijk	1–0	Charleroi	Kortrijk
18:15	Davies 45'	Report		Stadium: Guldensporen Stadion; Referee: Brent Staessens

9 February 2024 25	Sint-Truiden	1–0	Kortrijk	Sint-Truiden
20:45	Fujii 40' (o.g.)	Report	Sissako (yellow card) 83'; João Silva (yellow card) 87'	Stadium: Stayen; Referee: Wim Smet

18 February 2024 26	Kortrijk	1–3	Union Saint-Gilloise	Kortrijk
16:00	Davies 54'	Report	Rasmussen 8'; Castro-Montes 17'; Amoura 52'	Stadium: Guldensporen Stadion; Referee: Nathan Verboomen

24 February 2024 27	Mechelen	3–0	Kortrijk	Mechelen
20:45	Antonio 31'; Vandenberghe 79' (o.g.); Bafdili 90+3'	Report		Stadium: AFAS Stadion; Referee: Lawrence Visser

3 March 2024 28	Kortrijk	3–2	RWDM	Kortrijk
19:15	Davies 9'; Kadri 63', 74' (pen.)	Report	Biron 24'; Reine-Adélaïde 65'	Stadium: Guldensporen Stadion; Referee: Jonathan Lardot

9 March 2024 29	Kortrijk	0–1	Antwerp	Kortrijk
16:00		Report	Ilenikhena 31'; Van Den Bosch (yellow card) 40'	Stadium: Guldensporen Stadion; Referee: Bert Put

16 March 2024 30	Anderlecht	0–1	Kortrijk	Anderlecht
20:45	Rits (yellow card) 62'	Report	Davies 79'; Malinov (yellow card) 88'; Alebiosu (yellow card) 89'	Stadium: Lotto Park; Referee: Erik Lambrechts

==== Results summary ====
Overall								Home						Away					
Pld	W	D	L	GF	GA	GD	Pts	W	D	L	GF	GA	GD	W	D	L	GF	GA	GD
6	2	1	3	7	10	−3	7	1	0	2	4	6	−2	1	1	1	3	4	−1

Last updated: 11 May 2024.

==== Results by round ====
Round	1	2	3	4	5	6
Ground	A	H	H	A	H	A
Result	D	L	L	W	W	L
Position	3	4	4	3	2	2

Updated to match(es) played on 11 May 2024. Source:
A = Away; H = Home; W = Win; D = Draw; L = Loss

==== Matches ====
7 April 2024 1	Eupen	1–1	Kortrijk	Eupen
16:00	Keita (yellow card) 28'; Charles-Cook 80'	Report	Davies 50'; Kana (yellow card) 55'; Ojo (yellow card) 65'	Stadium: Kehrwegstadion; Attendance: 2,525; Referee: Lawrence Visser

14 April 2024 2	Kortrijk	1–2	Charleroi	Kortrijk
16:00	Davies 45+2'	Report	Camara (yellow card) 32'; Bernier 54'; Dari 90+4'	Stadium: Guldensporen Stadion; Attendance: 6,691; Referee: Nicolas Laforge

21 April 2024 3	Kortrijk	2–4	RWDM	Kortrijk
16:00	João Silva (yellow card) 23'; Ambrose 37'; Sissako (yellow card) 46'; Davies 66'	Report	Gueye 11', (yellow card) 67'; Sousa 14', (yellow card) 29'; Carlos Alberto 24' (pen.); Abe (yellow card) 44'; Sambu (yellow card) 62'; Reine-Adélaïde 90+8'	Stadium: Guldensporen Stadion; Attendance: 6,951; Referee: Jan Boterberg

28 April 2024 4	RWDM	0–1	Kortrijk	Molenbeek-Saint-Jean
19:15	Adaramola (yellow card) 17'; Mboup (yellow card) 79'	Report	Mehssatou 16'; Davies (yellow card) 21'; Kadri (yellow card) 57'	Stadium: Edmond Machtens Stadium; Referee: Jonathan Lardot

5 May 2024 5	Kortrijk	1–0	Eupen	Kortrijk
19:15	Sissako (yellow card) 14'; Davies (yellow card) 45+5'; João Silva 45+10'; Pirard (yellow card) 69'; Mehssatou (yellow card) 82'	Report	Emond (yellow card) 16'; Lambert (red card) 29'; Filin (yellow card) 45+6'; Youndje (yellow card) 81'	Stadium: Guldensporen Stadion; Referee: Nathan Verboomen

11 May 2024 6	Charleroi	3–1	Kortrijk	Charleroi
18:15	Heymans 24' (pen.); Bernier 38'; Sylla 70'	Report	Davies 58'; Kadri (yellow card) 90+2'	Stadium: Stade du Pays de Charleroi; Referee: Wim Smet

==== Promotion/relegation play-offs ====
===== Barrage =====
19 May 2024 First leg	Lommel	0–1	Kortrijk	Lommel
18:30	Rosa (yellow card) 8'; Wouters (yellow card) 30'; Schoofs (yellow card) 77'		Kadri 14' (pen.); De Neve (yellow card) 36'; Sissako (yellow card) 45'; Ambrose (yellow card) 69'; Silva (yellow card) 84'; Pirard (yellow card) 90+2'	Stadium: Soevereinstadion; Attendance: 4,436; Referee: Lawrence Wisser

26 May 2024 Second leg	Kortrijk	4–2 (5–2 agg.)	Lommel	Kortrijk
13:30	Ambrose 96', 101', 117', (yellow card) 118'; Malinov (yellow card) 45'; Avenatti (yellow card) 107'; Silva 109'	Report	Rosa 3'; Oware (yellow card) 45+3' (yellow-red card) 98'; Dermane (yellow card) 66'; Sales (yellow card) 85'; Schoofs 105' (pen.); Granell (yellow card) 105+3'	Stadium: Guldensporen Stadion; Referee: Bert Put

=== Belgian Cup ===
1 November 2023 Seventh round	Dender	1–1 (a.e.t.) (3–4 p)	Kortrijk	Denderleeuw
19:00	Rajsel 10', (yellow card) 101'; Masangu (yellow card) 11' (yellow-red card) 37'; Ruyssen (yellow card) 80'; Rôdes (yellow card) 85'; Pupe (yellow card) 90'; Myny (yellow card) 107'; Akman (yellow card) 116'	Report	Kadri 28' (pen.), (yellow card) 110'; Bruno (yellow card) 44'; Mbayo (yellow card) 120+2' (yellow-red card) 120+5'	Stadium: Van Roystadion; Referee: Hannes De Couvreur

5 December 2023 Seventh round	Kortrijk	0–1	RWDM	Kortrijk
20:00	Henen (yellow card) 42'	Report	Sissako (yellow card) 24'; Del Piage (yellow card) 27'; Reine-Adélaïde 84', (yellow card) 85'; Koné (yellow card) 90+3'	Stadium: Guldensporen Stadion; Referee: Wesli De Cremer
