= List of Belgian football transfers winter 2024–25 =

This is a list of Belgian football transfers in the winter transfer window 2024–25 by club. Only transfers of the Jupiler Pro League are included.

== Jupiler Pro League ==
Note: Flags indicate national team as has been defined under FIFA eligibility rules. Players may hold more than one non-FIFA nationality.

=== Club Brugge ===
In:

No.	Pos.	Nation	Player
24	DF	NGR	Vince Osuji (from (Sweden) Kalmar)

Out:

No.	Pos.	Nation	Player
7	FW	DEN	Andreas Skov Olsen (to (Germany) VfL Wolfsburg)
28	DF	BEL	Dedryck Boyata (free agent)
—	FW	GHA	Kamal Sowah (to (Netherlands) NAC Breda)
—	FW	DEN	Philip Zinckernagel (to (United States) Chicago Fire, previously on loan at (Norway) Bodø/Glimt)

=== Union SG ===
In:

No.	Pos.	Nation	Player
20	FW	SUI	Marc Giger (from (Switzerland) Schaffhausen)
—	DF	SEN	Mamadou Thierno Barry (from (Norway) Tromsø)

Out:

No.	Pos.	Nation	Player
7	FW	BEL	Elton Kabangu (on loan to (Scotland) Hearts)
8	MF	CIV	Jean Thierry Lazare (on loan to Standard Liège)
15	FW	MLI	Mamadou Traoré (to (Spain) Castellón)
17	FW	FIN	Casper Terho (on loan to (Germany) SC Paderborn)
94	MF	MAD	Loïc Lapoussin (to Sint-Truiden)

=== Anderlecht ===
In:

No.	Pos.	Nation	Player
3	DF	DEN	Lucas Hey (from (Denmark) Nordsjælland)
21	MF	MEX	César Huerta (from (Mexico) UNAM)
22	FW	MAR	Elyess Dao (from (France) Amiens)
34	DF	BRA	Adryelson (on loan from (France) Lyon, previously on loan at (Brazil) Botafogo)
—	MF	NED	Cedric Hatenboer (from (Netherlands) Excelsior)

Out:

No.	Pos.	Nation	Player
7	FW	BEL	Francis Amuzu (to (Brazil) Grêmio)
13	DF	DEN	Mathias Jørgensen (to (United States) LA Galaxy)
21	MF	GUI	Amadou Diawara (to (Spain) Eldense)
36	FW	DEN	Anders Dreyer (to (United States) San Diego)
—	MF	NED	Cedric Hatenboer (on loan to (Netherlands) Excelsior)
—	MF	NGR	Ishaq Abdulrazak (to (Sweden) Värnamo, previously on loan at (Norway) Odd)

=== Cercle Brugge ===
In:

No.	Pos.	Nation	Player
5	DF	FRA	Lucas Perrin (on loan from (Germany) Hamburger SV)
14	DF	BEL	Beni Mpanzu (from Lierse)
23	MF	MEX	Heriberto Jurado (from (Mexico) Necaxa)
77	FW	FRA	Steve Ngoura (from (France) Le Havre)
89	GK	CUW	Eloy Room (free agent)

Out:

No.	Pos.	Nation	Player
9	FW	TOG	Kévin Denkey (to (United States) Cincinnati)
19	FW	BEL	Kazeem Olaigbe (to (France) Rennes)

=== Genk ===
In:

No.	Pos.	Nation	Player
19	DF	ECU	Yaimar Medina (from (Ecuador) Independiente del Valle)

Out:

No.	Pos.	Nation	Player
46	DF	COL	Carlos Cuesta (to (Turkey) Galatasaray)

=== Antwerp ===
In:

No.	Pos.	Nation	Player
5	DF	BEL	Olivier Deman (on loan from (Germany) Werder Bremen)
11	MF	ENG	Kadan Young (on loan from (England) Aston Villa)
15	GK	BEL	Yannick Thoelen (from Mechelen)
16	MF	ARG	Mauricio Benítez (on loan from (Argentina) Boca Juniors)
27	FW	GUI	Mohamed Bayo (on loan from (France) Lille)
76	MF	NGR	Orseer Achihi (from (Nigeria) PSF Academy)
92	FW	NGR	Gabriel David (on loan from (Nigeria) PSF Academy)

Out:

No.	Pos.	Nation	Player
1	GK	FRA	Jean Butez (to (Italy) Como)
5	DF	ARG	Ayrton Costa (to (Argentina) Boca Juniors)
11	FW	SWE	Jacob Ondrejka (to (Italy) Parma)
19	FW	NGR	Victor Udoh (to (England) Southampton)

=== Gent ===
In:

No.	Pos.	Nation	Player
2	DF	CMR	Samuel Kotto (from (Sweden) Malmö, previously on loan at (Sweden) Värnamo)
5	MF	POR	Leonardo Lopes (free agent)
14	FW	BEL	Dante Vanzeir (from (United States) New York Red Bulls)
32	GK	BEL	Tom Vandenberghe (from Kortrijk)
45	FW	CIV	Hyllarion Goore (from (Armenia) Ararat Yerevan)

Out:

No.	Pos.	Nation	Player
1	GK	JPN	Daniel Schmidt (to (Japan) Nagoya Grampus)
7	FW	HUN	Zalán Vancsa (loan return to Lommel)
25	DF	ANG	Núrio Fortuna (on loan to (France) Dunkerque)

=== Mechelen ===
In:

No.	Pos.	Nation	Player
21	DF	SCO	Stephen Welsh (on loan from (Scotland) Celtic)
22	GK	ESP	Nacho Miras (from Deinze)
27	MF	BEL	Keano Vanrafelghem (from Patro Eisden)
33	MF	SWE	Fredrik Hammar (from (Sweden) Hammarby)

Out:

No.	Pos.	Nation	Player
2	DF	BEL	Jules Van Cleemput (retired)
5	DF	IDN	Sandy Walsh (to (Japan) Yokohama F. Marinos)
15	GK	BEL	Yannick Thoelen (to Antwerp)
39	MF	GHA	Isaac Asante (to (Lithuania) Panevėžys)

=== Sint-Truiden ===
In:

No.	Pos.	Nation	Player
10	FW	CMR	Didier Lamkel Zé (from (Turkey) Fatih Karagümrük)
18	DF	NOR	Simen Juklerød (from (Norway) Vålerenga)
26	DF	MKD	Visar Musliu (from (Germany) SC Paderborn)
41	FW	JPN	Hiiro Komori (on loan from (Japan) JEF United Chiba)
94	MF	MAD	Loïc Lapoussin (from Union SG)

Out:

No.	Pos.	Nation	Player
24	DF	BEL	David Mindombe (to RAEC Mons)
27	DF	TOG	Frederic Ananou (to (Germany) Jahn Regensburg)

=== OH Leuven ===
In:

No.	Pos.	Nation	Player
7	FW	BEL	Thibaud Verlinden (from Beerschot)
9	FW	NED	Lequincio Zeefuik (on loan from (Netherlands) AZ)
22	FW	SRB	Jovan Mijatović (on loan from (United States) New York City)
34	DF	SUI	Roggerio Nyakossi (from (France) Marseille B)
66	DF	JPN	Ayumu Ōhata (from (Japan) Urawa Red Diamonds)

Out:

No.	Pos.	Nation	Player
11	FW	CIV	Konan N'Dri (to (Italy) Lecce)
17	FW	THA	Suphanat Mueanta (loan return to (Thailand) Buriram United)
20	DF	MAR	Hamza Mendyl (to (Greece) Aris Thessaloniki)
22	FW	MTQ	Mickaël Biron (loan return to RWDM)
—	FW	BEL	Nachon Nsingi (on loan to (Portugal) Marítimo, previously on loan at (France) Dunkerque)

=== Westerlo ===
In:

No.	Pos.	Nation	Player
13	FW	JPN	Isa Sakamoto (on loan from (Japan) Gamba Osaka)
19	FW	ALG	Islam Slimani (on loan from (Algeria) Belouizdad)
73	DF	BEL	Amando Lapage (from RSCA Futures)
99	GK	DEN	Andreas Jungdal (on loan from (Italy) Cremonese)

Out:

No.	Pos.	Nation	Player
1	GK	TUR	Sinan Bolat (on loan to (Turkey) Kasımpaşa)
2	DF	TUR	Emir Ortakaya (loan return to (Turkey) Fenerbahçe)
11	MF	TUR	Muhammed Gümüşkaya (on loan to (Turkey) Gaziantep)
47	FW	SCO	Adedire Mebude (on loan to (Germany) Hamburger SV)

=== Standard Liège ===
In:

No.	Pos.	Nation	Player
8	MF	CIV	Jean Thierry Lazare (on loan from Union SG)
20	MF	FRA	Ibrahim Karamoko (from (France) Versailles)
31	GK	IRL	Gavin Bazunu (on loan from (England) Southampton)
41	DF	HUN	Attila Szalai (on loan from (Germany) TSG Hoffenheim)
77	FW	BEN	Andréas Hountondji (on loan from (England) Burnley)

Out:

No.	Pos.	Nation	Player
8	MF	NIR	Isaac Price (to (England) West Bromwich Albion)
10	MF	MNE	Viktor Đukanović (loan return to (Sweden) Hammarby)
15	DF	CIV	Souleyman Doumbia (on loan to (United States) Charlotte)
16	GK	BEL	Arnaud Bodart (to (France) Metz)
19	FW	GAM	Muhammed Badamosi (loan return to (Serbia) Čukarički)
21	FW	MAR	Soufiane Benjdida (on loan to RWDM)
33	MF	RWA	Hakim Sahabo (on loan to Beerschot)

=== Charleroi ===
In:

No.	Pos.	Nation	Player
4	DF	SYR	Aiham Ousou (from (Czech Republic) Slavia Prague, previously on loan)
28	FW	GHA	Raymond Asante (from (Italy) Udinese U20, previously on loan)

Out:

No.	Pos.	Nation	Player
9	FW	PLE	Oday Dabbagh (on loan to (Scotland) Aberdeen)
80	FW	BEL	Youssuf Sylla (on loan to (Denmark) Willem II)

=== Kortrijk ===
In:

No.	Pos.	Nation	Player
5	DF	CMR	James Ndjeungoue (from (Slovakia) Žilina)
8	MF	TOG	Dermane Karim (on loan from Lommel)
9	FW	POL	Karol Czubak (from (Poland) Arka Gdynia)
18	FW	NED	Koen Kostons (on loan from (Germany) SC Paderborn 07)
23	MF	MAD	Marco Ilaimaharitra (free agent)
32	MF	SEN	Mouhamed Guèye (from (Austria) Rapid Wien II)
33	DF	JPN	Ryotaro Tsunoda (on loan from (Wales) Cardiff City)
41	GK	SRB	Marko Ilić (from (Serbia) Red Star Belgrade)
93	DF	HAI	Jean-Kévin Duverne (on loan from (France) Nantes)

Out:

No.	Pos.	Nation	Player
1	GK	BEL	Tom Vandenberghe (to Gent)
2	DF	ENG	Ryan Alebiosu (on loan to (Scotland) St. Mirren)
7	FW	FRA	Mounaïm El Idrissy (to (France) Troyes)
9	FW	CRO	Roko Šimić (loan return to (Wales) Cardiff City)
14	MF	NOR	Iver Fossum (to (Norway) Rosenborg)
15	MF	BUL	Kristiyan Malinov (to (Hungary) Debrecen)
23	MF	JPN	Tomoki Takamine (to (Japan) Hokkaido Consadole Sapporo)
30	MF	JPN	Takuro Kaneko (to (Japan) Urawa Red Diamonds)
44	DF	POR	João Silva (to (Brazil) Sport Recife)
45	FW	ALG	Billel Messaoudi (on loan to (Turkey) Bandırmaspor)
—	DF	BEL	Massimo Decoene (on loan to (Slovenia) Mura, previously on loan at Lokeren-Temse)

=== Beerschot ===
In:

No.	Pos.	Nation	Player
3	DF	TUR	Emir Ortakaya (on loan from (Turkey) Fenerbahçe, previously on loan at Westerlo)
10	FW	SUR	Daishawn Redan (on loan from (Italy) Avellino)
11	DF	SUR	Djevencio van der Kust (on loan from (Netherlands) Sparta Rotterdam)
23	MF	RWA	Hakim Sahabo (on loan from Standard Liège)
77	MF	NED	Rajiv van La Parra (free agent)
—	FW	SRB	Ensar Brahić (from (Serbia) Novi Pazar)

Out:

No.	Pos.	Nation	Player
3	DF	BEL	Hervé Matthys (to (Poland) Motor Lublin)
10	FW	BEL	Thibaud Verlinden (to OH Leuven)
11	FW	GER	Florian Krüger (on loan to (Germany) 1. FC Saarbrücken)
27	FW	CIV	Charly Keita (to (Turkey) Amed)

=== Dender ===
In:

No.	Pos.	Nation	Player
17	MF	BEL	Noah Mbamba (on loan from (Germany) Bayer Leverkusen, previously on loan at (Germany) Fortuna Düsseldorf)
19	FW	NGR	Jordan Kadiri (free agent)
29	DF	ENG	Tom Holmes (on loan from (England) Luton Town)

Out:

No.	Pos.	Nation	Player
17	FW	CMR	Abdoulaye Yahaya (on loan to Francs Borains)
19	FW	TUR	Ali Akman (to (Turkey) Çorum)
98	FW	BEL	Jordy Soladio (to (Israel) Maccabi Petah Tikva)

== See also ==
- 2024–25 Belgian Pro League
