= 2024–25 KV Kortrijk season =

K.V. Kortrijk
2024–25 season
- Manager: Freyr Alexandersson (until 17 December); Yves Vanderhaeghe (18 December–19 February); Bernd Storck (from 20 February)
- Stadium: Guldensporen Stadion
- Belgian Pro League: Regular season: 15th Relegation play-offs 3rd (relegated)
- Belgian Cup: Round of 16
- Top goalscorer: League: Thierry Ambrose; Nacho Ferri (6); All: Nacho Ferri (7)

The 2024–25 season marks the 104th season in the history of KV Kortrijk and the 17th consecutive season in the Belgian Pro League. The team also competed in the Belgian Cup.

On 17 December, following a 0–3 home defeat to Dender and the team's dwindling chances of avoiding relegation, head coach Freyr Alexandersson was dismissed. He was succeeded by Yves Vanderhaeghe for his third tenure.

On 4 May 2025, KV Kortrijk was formally relegated to the Belgian second division, marking its first return to that level since 2008.

== Transfers ==
=== In ===
Pos.	Player	Transferred from	Fee	Date	Source
MF	(Senegal) Mouhamed Guèye	(Austria) SK Rapid Wien II	Undisclosed	5 January 2025	
DF	(Japan) Ryotaro Tsunoda	(Wales) Cardiff City	Loan	7 January 2025	
MF	(Togo) Karim Dermane	(Belgium) Lommel	Loan	14 January 2025	
MF	(Madagascar) Marco Ilaimaharitra	Unattached	Free	15 January 2025	
FW	(Netherlands) Koen Kostons	(Germany) SC Paderborn	Loan	30 January 2025	
DF	(Belgium) Massimo Decoene	(Belgium) Lokeren-Temse	Loan return	4 February 2025	

=== Out ===
Pos.	Player	Transferred to	Fee	Date	Source
MF	(Bulgaria) Kristiyan Malinov	(Hungary) Debreceni VSC	Undisclosed	1 January 2025	
MF	(Japan) Takuro Kaneko	(Japan) Urawa Red Diamonds	Undisclosed	4 January 2025	
MF	(Japan) Tomoki Takamine	(Japan) Hokkaido Consadole Sapporo	Undisclosed	5 January 2025	
GK	(Belgium) Tom Vandenberghe	(Belgium) Gent	Undisclosed	7 January 2025	
MF	(England) Ryan Alebiosu	(Scotland) St Mirren	Loan	3 February 2025	
DF	(Belgium) Massimo Decoene	(Slovenia) NŠ Mura	Loan	5 February 2025	
DF	(Portugal) João Silva	(Brazil) Sport Recife	Undisclosed	13 February 2025	

== Friendlies ==
6 July 2024 Friendly	Lens (France)	6–3	(Belgium) Kortrijk

13 July 2024 Friendly	Cardiff City (Wales)	3–1	(Belgium) Kortrijk

17 July 2024 Friendly	Kortrijk (Belgium)	5–0	(France) Amiens

20 July 2024 Friendly	AZ Alkmaar (Netherlands)	3–0	(Belgium) Kortrijk

6 January 2025 Friendly	Charleroi (Belgium)	2–1	(Belgium) Kortrijk	Tubize
	Dabbagh; Mbenza	Report		Stadium: National Centre

== Competitions ==
=== Overall record ===
Competition	First match	Last match	Starting round	Final position	Record							
Competition	First match	Last match	Starting round	Final position	Pld	W	D	L	GF	GA	GD	Win %
Belgian Pro League	28 July 2024	16 March 2025	Matchday 1	15th	30	7	5	18	28	55	−27	23.33
Relegation play-offs	30 March 2025	10 May 2025	Matchday 1	3rd	5	3	1	1	10	6	+4	60.00
Belgian Cup	30 October 2024	4 December 2024	Seventh round	Round of 16	2	1	1	0	1	0	+1	50.00
Total					37	11	7	19	39	61	−22	29.73

Last updated: 3 May 2025
Source: Competitions

=== Belgian Pro League ===
==== League table ====
Pos	Team	Pld	W	D	L	GF	GA	GD	Pts	Qualification or relegation
12	Dender EH	30	8	8	14	33	51	−18	32	Qualification for the Europe play-offs
13	Cercle Brugge	30	7	11	12	29	44	−15	32	Qualification for the Relegation play-offs
14	Sint-Truiden	30	7	10	13	41	56	−15	31	Qualification for the Relegation play-offs
15	Kortrijk	30	7	5	18	28	55	−27	26	Qualification for the Relegation play-offs
16	Beerschot	30	3	9	18	26	60	−34	18	Qualification for the Relegation play-offs

Source: Jupiler Pro League (in Dutch), Soccerway
Rules for classification: 1) Points; 2) Matches won; 3) Goal difference; 4) Goals scored; 5) Away matches won; 6) Away goal difference; 7) Away goals scored; 8) Play-off.

==== Results summary ====
Overall								Home						Away					
Pld	W	D	L	GF	GA	GD	Pts	W	D	L	GF	GA	GD	W	D	L	GF	GA	GD
30	7	5	18	28	55	−27	26	5	2	8	14	20	−6	2	3	10	14	35	−21

==== Results by round ====
Round	1	2	3	4	5	6	7	8	9	10	11	12	13	14	15	16	17	18	19	20
Ground	H	A	A	H	A	H	H	A	A	H	A	H	A	H	A	H	A	H	A	H
Result	L	W	L	W	L	D	L	D	L	W	L	W	L	L	L	W	L	L	D	L
Position																				

Updated to match(es) played on 26 December 2024. Source:
A = Away; H = Home; W = Win; D = Draw; L = Loss

==== Matches ====
The league schedule was released on 11 June 2024.

28 July 2024 1	Kortrijk	0–1	Gent	Kortrijk
				Stadium: Guldensporen Stadion

4 August 2024 2	Cercle Brugge	1–2	Kortrijk	Bruges
				Stadium: Jan Breydel Stadium

10 August 2024 3	Dender	4–1	Kortrijk	Denderleeuw
				Stadium: Dender Football Complex

18 August 2024 4	Kortrijk	1–0	Standard Liège	Kortrijk
				Stadium: Guldensporen Stadion

25 August 2024 5	Charleroi	1–0	Kortrijk	Charleroi
				Stadium: Stade du Pays de Charleroi

1 September 2024 6	Kortrijk	1–1	Sint-Truiden	Kortrijk
				Stadium: Guldensporen Stadion

14 September 2024 7	Kortrijk	0–3	Club Brugge	Kortrijk
				Stadium: Guldensporen Stadion

22 September 2024 8	OH Leuven	1–1	Kortrijk	Leuven
				Stadium: Den Dreef

29 September 2024 9	Union Saint-Gilloise	3–0	Kortrijk	Forest
				Stadium: Joseph Marien Stadium

5 October 2024 10	Kortrijk	2–1	Genk	Kortrijk
				Stadium: Guldensporen Stadion

20 October 2024 11	Mechelen	3–0	Kortrijk	Mechelen
				Stadium: Achter de Kazerne

25 October 2024 12	Kortrijk	1–0	Beerschot	Kortrijk
				Stadium: Guldensporen Stadion

3 November 2024 13	Anderlecht	4–0	Kortrijk	Anderlecht

9 November 2024 14	Kortrijk	1–2	Royal Antwerp F.C.	Kortrijk
				Stadium: Guldensporen Stadion

24 November 2024 15	Westerlo	4–0	Kortrijk	Westerlo
19:15				Referee: Wim Smet

29 November 2024 16	Kortrijk	3–1	Mechelen	Kortrijk
20:45				Stadium: Guldensporen Stadion; Referee: Nathan Verboomen

7 December 2024 17	Genk	3–2	Kortrijk	Genk
16:00				Stadium: Cegeka Arena; Referee: Simon Bourdeaud'hui

14 December 2024 18	Kortrijk	0–3	Dender	Kortrijk
20:45			Berte 15'; Scheidler 17', 45+1'	Stadium: Guldensporen Stadion; Referee: Lawrence Visser

21 December 2024 19	Beerschot	2–2	Kortrijk	Antwerp
20:45	Reyners (yellow card) 43'; Colassin 55'; Verlinden 62', (yellow card) 90'; Weymans (yellow card) 88'		Messaoudi (yellow card) 45'; Sissako 49'; Ferri (yellow card) 52', (goal) 83'	Stadium: Olympisch Stadion; Referee: Nicolas Laforge

26 December 2024 20	Kortrijk	0–1	Charleroi	Kortrijk
16:00				Stadium: Guldensporen Stadion

10 January 2025 21	Standard Liège	1–0	Kortrijk	Liège
20:45	Eckert 50'			Stadium: Stade Maurice Dufrasne

19 January 2025 22	Kortrijk	0–2	Anderlecht	Kortrijk
13:30				Stadium: Guldensporen Stadion

25 January 2025 23	Club Brugge	1–1	Kortrijk	Bruges
20:45				Stadium: Jan Breydel Stadium

2 February 2025 24	Kortrijk	1–2	Westerlo	Kortrijk
				Stadium: Guldensporen Stadion

9 February 2025 25	Kortrijk	1–2	Union Saint-Gilloise	Kortrijk
				Stadium: Guldensporen Stadion

15 February 2025 26	Antwerp	2–1	Kortrijk	Antwerp

23 February 2025 27	Kortrijk	1–1	Cercle Brugge	Kortrijk
				Stadium: Guldensporen Stadion

1 March 2025 28	Sint-Truiden	4–2	Kortrijk	Sint-Truiden
				Stadium: Stayen

8 March 2025 29	Kortrijk	2–0	OH Leuven	Kortrijk
16:00				Stadium: Guldensporen Stadion

16 March 2025 30	Gent	1–2	Kortrijk	Ghent
18:30				Stadium: Planet Group Arena

==== Relegation play-offs ====
Pos	Team	Pld	W	D	L	GF	GA	GD	Pts	Qualification or relegation	STR	CER	KOR	BEE
1	Sint-Truiden	6	3	1	2	9	10	−1	41			3–1	0–3	2–1
2	Cercle Brugge (O)	6	2	1	3	10	13	−3	39	Qualification for the promotion/relegation play-offs	3–1		0–2	2–1
3	Kortrijk (R)	6	3	2	1	12	8	+4	37	Relegation to Challenger Pro League	2–2	2–2		3–2
4	Beerschot (R)	6	2	0	4	10	10	0	24	Relegation to Challenger Pro League	0–1	4–2	2–0	

Source: Jupiler Pro League (in Dutch), Soccerway
Rules for classification: 1) Points; 2) Regular season finishing position.
(O) Play-off winners; (R) Relegated

===== Results by round =====
Round	1	2	3	4
Ground	H	A	H	A
Result	D	W	W	L
Position	3	3	3	3

Updated to match(es) played on 25 April 2025. Source:
A = Away; H = Home; W = Win; D = Draw; L = Loss

30 March 2025 1	Kortrijk	2–2	Cercle Brugge	Kortrijk
16:00	Lagae 14', (red card) 33'; Kadri 90'		Agyekum 54'; Somers 80'; Francis (yellow card) 90+3' (yellow-red card) 90+5'	Stadium: Guldensporen Stadion; Attendance: 6,913; Referee: Lawrence Visser

6 April 2025 2	Sint-Truiden	0–3	Kortrijk	Sint-Truiden
16:00			Kadri 17'; Ferri 22'; Mehssatou 27'	Stadium: Stayen; Attendance: 4,595; Referee: Nicolas Laforge

12 April 2025 3	Kortrijk	3–2	Beerschot	Kortrijk
16:00	Duverne 39'; Ferri 43'; Mehssatou 82'		Henderson 17'; Colassin 45'	Stadium: Guldensporen Stadion; Referee: Wim Smet

25 April 2025 4	Beerschot	2–0	Kortrijk	Antwerp
20:45	Colassin 10'; Al-Sahafi 40'			Stadium: Olympisch Stadion; Referee: Nathan Verboomen

=== Belgian Cup ===
30 October 2024 Round of 32	Kortrijk	1–0	Lokeren-Temse	Kortrijk
	Kadri 46'			Stadium: Guldensporen Stadion

4 December 2024 Round of 16	Kortrijk	0–0 (a.e.t.) (3–4 p)	Antwerp	Kortrijk
20:30				Stadium: Guldensporen Stadion
