= 2022–23 Royal Charleroi SC season =

Royal Charleroi S.C.
2022–23 season
- Manager: Felice Mazzu
- Stadium: Stade du Pays de Charleroi
- Belgian Pro League: 9th
- Belgian Cup: Sixth round
- Top goalscorer: League: Daan Heymans (6); All: Daan Heymans (7)

The 2022–23 Royal Charleroi S.C. season was the club's 119th season in existence and the 11th consecutive season in the top flight of Belgian football. In addition to the domestic league, Charleroi participated in this season's edition of the Belgian Cup. The season covered the period from 1 July 2022 to 30 June 2023.

== Players ==
=== First-team squad ===
As of 2 February 2023

Note: Flags indicate national team as defined under FIFA eligibility rules; some limited exceptions apply. Players may hold more than one non-FIFA nationality.

No.	Pos.	Nation	Player
1	GK	FRA	Pierre Patron
2	DF	DEN	Jonas Bager
3	DF	SUI	Stefan Knezevic
4	DF	BEL	Jules Van Cleemput
6	MF	ALG	Adem Zorgane
7	FW	BEL	Isaac Mbenza
9	FW	CIV	Vakoun Issouf Bayo (on loan from Watford)
10	FW	SEN	Youssouph Badji (on loan from Club Brugge)
12	DF	BEL	Joris Kayembe
16	GK	BFA	Hervé Koffi
18	MF	BEL	Daan Heymans
19	FW	SRB	Nikola Štulić

No.	Pos.	Nation	Player
21	DF	CYP	Stelios Andreou
25	MF	FRA	Damien Marcq
26	MF	MAD	Marco Ilaimaharitra (captain)
28	FW	BEL	Ken Nkuba
32	DF	BEL	Mehdi Boukamir
38	MF	BEL	Jackson Tchatchoua
40	GK	BEL	Matteo Chiacig
44	MF	JPN	Ryota Morioka
45	FW	ALG	Ahmed Nadhir Benbouali
55	GK	BEL	Martin Delavallée
99	MF	IRI	Amirhossein Hosseinzadeh
—	DF	NGR	Valentine Ozornwafor

=== On loan ===
Note: Flags indicate national team as defined under FIFA eligibility rules; some limited exceptions apply. Players may hold more than one non-FIFA nationality.

No.	Pos.	Nation	Player
—	GK	FRA	Didier Desprez (at Paris 13 Atletico until 30 June 2023)
—	GK	BEL	Martin Wasinski (at Kortrijk until 30 June 2023)
—	DF	TOG	Loïc Bessilé (at Eupen until 30 June 2023)
—	MF	IRI	Ali Gholizadeh (at Kasımpaşa until 30 June 2023)

No.	Pos.	Nation	Player
—	MF	FRA	Julien Maggiotti (at Laval until 30 June 2023)
—	FW	BEL	Anthony Descotte (at Utrecht until 30 June 2023)
—	FW	LTU	Nauris Petkevičius (at Žalgiris until 31 December 2023)

== Transfers ==
=== In ===
Pos	Player	Transferred from	Fee	Date	Source
GK	Martin Delavallée	Royal Excel Mouscron	Free	19 June 2022	
MF	(France) Julien Maggiotti	(France) Laval	Undisclosed	21 June 2022	
GK	(France) Pierre Patron	(France) Le Mans	Undisclosed	4 July 2022	
DF	(Bulgaria) Ivan Goranov	(Bulgaria) Levski Sofia	End of loan	13 July 2022	
DF	(Denmark) Jonas Bager	Union SG	Free	13 July 2022	
MF	(France) Damien Marcq	Union SG	Free	14 July 2022	
FW	(Algeria) Ahmed Nadhir Benbouali	(Algeria) Paradou AC	Undisclosed	22 July 2022	
FW	Mitchy Ntelo	Standard Liège	Free	4 August 2022	
MF	(Iran) Amirhossein Hosseinzadeh	(Iran) Esteghlal	Undisclosed	22 August 2022	
FW	(Ivory Coast) Vakoun Issouf Bayo	(England) Watford	Loan	30 January 2023	
FW	(Serbia) Nikola Štulić	(Serbia) Radnički Niš	Undisclosed	31 January 2023	
DF	(Nigeria) Valentine Ozornwafor	(France) Sochaux	End of loan	31 January 2023	
MF	(Ivory Coast) Aboubakar Keita	(Israel) Sektzia Ness Ziona	End of loan	1 February 2023	
FW	(Lithuania) Nauris Petkevičius	Beerschot	End of loan	3 February 2023	

=== Out ===
Pos	Player	Transferred to	Fee	Date	Source
MF	(France) Julien Maggiotti	(France) Laval	Loan	21 June 2022	
FW	(Ivory Coast) Vakoun Issouf Bayo	(England) Watford	Undisclosed	2 July 2022	
DF	(Nigeria) Valentine Ozornwafor	(France) Sochaux	Loan	8 July 2022	
DF	(Bulgaria) Ivan Goranov	(Greece) Lamia	Undisclosed	13 July 2022	
GK	(France) Didier Desprez	(France) Paris 13 Atletico	Loan	13 July 2022	
FW	Fabio Ferraro	RWDM	Free	17 July 2022	
MF	(Ivory Coast) Aboubakar Keita	(Israel) Sektzia Ness Ziona	Loan	19 July 2022	
DF	Romain Donnez	Francs Borains	Free	25 July 2022	
MF	(Morocco) Anass Zaroury	(England) Burnley	Undisclosed	30 August 2022	
FW	(Lithuania) Nauris Petkevičius	Beerschot	Loan	1 September 2022	
MF	Martin Wasinski	Kortrijk	Loan	6 January 2023	
DF	(Ivory Coast) Benjamin Karamoko	(Bulgaria) Spartak Varna	Undisclosed	11 January 2023	
FW	Anthony Descotte	(Netherlands) Utrecht	Loan	31 January 2023	
FW	(Togo) Loïc Bessilé	Eupen	Loan	31 January 2023	
MF	(Ivory Coast) Aboubakar Keita	(Sweden) AIK	Free	1 February 2023	
FW	(Iran) Ali Gholizadeh	(Turkey) Kasımpaşa	Loan	2 February 2023	
FW	(Lithuania) Nauris Petkevičius	(Lithuania) Žalgiris	Loan	3 February 2023	

== Pre-season and friendlies ==
Win Draw Loss

25 June 2022 Friendly	Racing-Union (Luxembourg)	1–3	(Belgium) Charleroi	Luxembourg City, Luxembourg
18:00 CEST (UTC+2)	Nakache 88'	Report	Descotte 44'; Tchatchoua 71'; De Nève 77'	Stadium: Stade Achille Hammerel

29 June 2022 Friendly	Zulte Waregem (Belgium)	1–1	(Belgium) Charleroi	Ingelmunster, Belgium
18:00 CEST (UTC+2)	Vossen 55' (pen.)	Report	Morioka 3'	Stadium: OMS Ingelmunster Stadion

2 July 2022 Friendly	OH Leuven (Belgium)	3–1	(Belgium) Charleroi	Leuven, Belgium
17:30 CEST (UTC+2)	Holzhauser 31' (pen.); Nsingi 58'; Kukharevych 90'	Report	Zaroury 53'	Stadium: Den Dreef

8 July 2022 Friendly	Charleroi (Belgium)	1–2	(Belgium) Seraing	Tubize, Belgium
11:00 CEST (UTC+2)	De Nève 80'	Report	Guillaume 4'; Mouandilmadji 44'	Stadium: Centre National de Football Euro 2000

16 July 2022 Friendly	Charleroi (Belgium)	1–2	(France) Strasbourg	Charleroi, Belgium
19:00 CEST (UTC+2)	Ilaimaharitra 47'	Report	Diarra 49'; Prcić 53'	Stadium: Stade du Pays de Charleroi; Attendance: 3,000; Referee: Ken Vermeiren (Belgium)

8 December 2022 Friendly	Beşiktaş (Turkey)	2–1	(Belgium) Charleroi	Belek, Turkey
19:00 CET (UTC+1)	Muleka 16'; Sanuç 39'	Report	Hosseinzadeh 50'	Stadium: Gloria Sports Arena; Referee: Ömer Faruk Turtay (Turkey)

16 December 2022 Friendly	Reims (France)	3–0	(Belgium) Charleroi	Bétheny, France
15:00 CET (UTC+1)	Balogun 37'; Adeline 60'; Zeneli 75'	Report		Stadium: Stade Louis Blériot N°1

== Competitions ==
=== Overview ===
Competition	First match	Last match	Starting round	Final position	Record							
Competition	First match	Last match	Starting round	Final position	Pld	W	D	L	GF	GA	GD	Win %
Belgian Pro League	23 July 2022	23 April 2023	Matchday 1	9th	34	14	6	14	45	52	−7	41.18
Belgian Cup	8 November 2022	8 November 2022	Sixth round	Sixth round	1	0	0	1	1	4	−3	0.00
Total					35	14	6	15	46	56	−10	40.00

Last updated: 23 April 2023
Source: [ Soccerway]

=== Belgian Pro League ===
==== League table ====
Pos	Team	Pld	W	D	L	GF	GA	GD	Pts	Qualification or relegation
7	Westerlo	34	14	9	11	61	53	+8	51	Qualification for the Play-offs II
8	Cercle Brugge	34	13	11	10	50	46	+4	50	Qualification for the Play-offs II
9	Charleroi	34	14	6	14	45	52	−7	48	
10	OH Leuven	34	13	9	12	56	48	+8	48	
11	Anderlecht	34	13	7	14	49	46	+3	46	

Source: Jupiler Pro League (in Dutch), Soccerway
Rules for classification: 1) Points; 2) Matches won; 3) Goal difference; 4) Goals scored; 5) Away matches won; 6) Away goal difference; 7) Away goals scored; 8) Play-off.

==== Results summary ====
Overall								Home						Away					
Pld	W	D	L	GF	GA	GD	Pts	W	D	L	GF	GA	GD	W	D	L	GF	GA	GD
34	14	6	14	45	52	−7	48	7	2	8	23	27	−4	7	4	6	22	25	−3

Last updated: 10 May 2023.
Source: Jupiler Pro League

==== Results by round ====
Round	1	2	3	4	5	6	7	8	9	10	11	12	13	14	15	16	17	18	19	20	21	22	23	24	25	26	27	28	29	30	31	32	33	34
Ground	H	A	H	A	A	H	H	A	H	A	H	A	H	A	H	A	H	H	A	H	A	A	H	A	H	A	H	A	H	A	A	H	A	H
Result	W	L	L	W	W	L	W	L	L	W	L	L	D	L	W	L	L	L	W	W	D	D	L	D	W	D	W	W	L	W	W	W	L	D
Position																																		9

Updated to match(es) played on 11 May 2023. Source: Jupiler Pro League
A = Away; H = Home; W = Win; D = Draw; L = Loss

==== Matches ====
The league fixture was announced on 22 June 2022.

23 July 2022 1	Charleroi	3–1	Eupen	Charleroi
16:00 CEST	Zaroury 18'; Bessilé 50'; Gholizadeh 90+4'	Report	N'Dri 76'	Stadium: Stade du Pays de Charleroi; Referee: Bram Van Driessche

29 July 2022 2	Union SG	1–0	Charleroi	Brussels
20:45 CEST	Sykes 56'	Report		Stadium: Joseph Marien Stadium; Referee: Nicolas Laforge

6 August 2022 3	Charleroi	1–3	Oostende	Charleroi
18:15 CEST	Nkuba 55'	Report	D'Haese 28'; Bätzner 66'; Ndicka 90+6'	Stadium: Stade du Pays de Charleroi; Referee: Kevin Van Damme

13 August 2022 4	Seraing	0–1	Charleroi	Seraing
18:15 CEST		Report	Tchatchoua 85'	Stadium: Stade du Pairay; Referee: Bram Van Driessche

21 August 2022 5	Zulte Waregem	1–3	Charleroi	Waregem
16:00 CEST	Fadera 5'	Report	Heymans 36'; Kayembe 83'; Zaroury 89'	Stadium: Elindus Arena; Referee: Erik Lambrechts

26 August 2022 6	Charleroi	1–3	Club Brugge	Charleroi
20:45 CEST	Morioka 9'	Report	Jutglà 32', 36'; Nielsen 58'	Stadium: Stade du Pays de Charleroi; Referee: Jasper Vergoote

4 September 2022 7	Charleroi	2–1	Gent	Charleroi
18:30 CEST	Morioka 37'; Zorgane 73'	Report	Hong 22'	Stadium: Stade du Pays de Charleroi; Referee: Lothar D'hondt

10 September 2022 8	OH Leuven	3–2	Charleroi	Leuven
20:45 CEST	Maertens 22'; González 62', 85'	Report	Heymans 13'; Ilaimaharitra 76' (pen.)	Stadium: Den Dreef; Referee: Bram Van Driessche

17 September 2022 9	Charleroi	2–3	Westerlo	Charleroi
20:45 CEST	Mbenza 36'; Badji 88'	Report	Reynolds 3'; De Cuyper 10'; Vaesen 89'	Stadium: Stade du Pays de Charleroi; Referee: Arthur Denil

2 October 2022 10	Anderlecht	0–1	Charleroi	Brussels
13:30 CEST		Report	Morioka 65'	Stadium: Lotto Park; Referee: Lothar D'hondt

9 October 2022 11	Charleroi	0–1	Standard Liège	Charleroi
18:30 CEST		Report	Tchatchoua 45+2' (o.g.)	Stadium: Stade du Pays de Charleroi; Referee: Nathan Verboomen

15 October 2022 12	Sint-Truiden	2–1	Charleroi	Sint-Truiden
18:15 CEST	Kagawa 12'; Boya 70'	Report	Hosseinzadeh 90+2'	Stadium: Stayen; Referee: Wim Smet

18 October 2022 13	Charleroi	2–2	Kortrijk	Charleroi
18:30 CEST	Heymans 27'; Ilaimaharitra 42'	Report	Guèye 52'; Avenatti 87'	Stadium: Stade du Pays de Charleroi; Referee: Brent Staessens

21 October 2022 14	Cercle Brugge	4–1	Charleroi	Bruges
20:45 CEST	Ueda 32', 57'; Gboho 73'; Kehrer 90'	Report	Heymans 67' (pen.)	Stadium: Jan Breydel Stadium; Referee: Lawrence Visser

30 October 2022 15	Charleroi	1–0	Antwerp	Charleroi
21:00 CEST	Benbouali 35'	Report		Stadium: Stade du Pays de Charleroi; Referee: Bram Van Driessche

4 November 2022 16	Genk	4–1	Charleroi	Genk
20:45 CEST	Onuachu 9' (pen.), 35', 71', 90+5'	Report	Heymans 66'	Stadium: Cegeka Arena; Referee: Alexandre Boucaut

12 November 2022 17	Charleroi	0–5	Mechelen	Charleroi
20:45 CEST	Benbouali 52'	Report		Stadium: Stade du Pays de Charleroi; Referee: Jan Boterberg
Note: The match was stopped at the 67th minute while Charleroi led 1–0, due to Charleroi supporters throwing pyrotechnics on to the pitch. On 23 November 2022, Charleroi was penalized with a fine of €75,000 and a threat of three matches behind closed doors. A few months later following appeals, the Belgian Court of Arbitration for Sport ruled a forfeit victory for Mechelen.

26 December 2022 18	Charleroi	0–1	Anderlecht	Charleroi
20:45 CEST		Report	Zorgane 85' (o.g.)	Stadium: Stade du Pays de Charleroi; Referee: Lawrence Visser

7 January 2023 19	Eupen	1–2	Charleroi	Eupen
16:00 CEST	Lambert 42'	Report	Nkuba 55'; Marcq 88'	Stadium: Kehrwegstadion; Referee: Alexandre Boucaut

15 January 2023 20	Charleroi	2–1	Cercle Brugge	Charleroi
21:00 CEST	Mbenza 44'; Hosseinzadeh 51'	Report	Vanhoutte 27'	Stadium: Stade du Pays de Charleroi; Referee: Arthur Denil

19 January 2023 21	Gent	0–0	Charleroi	Ghent
18:30 CEST		Report		Stadium: Ghelamco Arena; Referee: Kevin Van Damme

22 January 2023 22	Club Brugge	2–2	Charleroi	Bruges
18:30 CEST	Lang 45+2' (pen.); Skov Olsen 50'	Report	Badji 13'; Mechele 16' (o.g.)	Stadium: Jan Breydel Stadium; Referee: Jonathan Lardot

28 January 2023 23	Charleroi	0–1	Union SG	Charleroi
20:45 CEST		Report	Nilsson 24'	Stadium: Stade du Pays de Charleroi; Referee: Lawrence Visser

5 February 2023 24	Mechelen	2–2	Charleroi	Mechelen
16:00 CEST	Storm 5'; Hairemans 27'	Report	Zorgane 66', 67'	Stadium: Achter de Kazerne; Referee: Nicolas Laforge

11 February 2023 25	Charleroi	3–0	Seraing	Charleroi
18:15 CEST	Bayo 18'; Bager 52'; Ilaimaharitra 61' (pen.)	Report		Stadium: Stade du Pays de Charleroi; Referee: Jonathan Lardot

18 February 2023 26	Oostende	0–0	Charleroi	Ostend
18:15 CEST		Report		Stadium: Diaz Arena; Referee: Arthur Denil

26 February 2023 27	Charleroi	1–0	Sint-Truiden	Charleroi
19:15 CEST	Zorgane 69'	Report		Stadium: Stade du Pays de Charleroi; Referee: Jan Boterberg

4 March 2023 28	Kortrijk	0–1	Charleroi	Kortrijk
16:00 CEST		Report	Badji 73'	Stadium: Guldensporen Stadion; Referee: Nicolas Laforge

10 March 2023 29	Charleroi	0–1	OH Leuven	Charleroi
20:45 CEST		Report	Al-Taamari 16'	Stadium: Stade du Pays de Charleroi; Referee: Bram Van Driessche

19 March 2023 30	Antwerp	0–1	Charleroi	Antwerp
13:30 CEST		Report	Badji 15'	Stadium: Bosuilstadion; Referee: Nathan Verboomen

1 April 2023 31	Westerlo	2–3	Charleroi	Westerlo
18:15 CEST	Fixelles 8'; Dierckx 89' (pen.)	Report	Bayo 35'; Heymans 39'; Badji 90+2'	Stadium: Het Kuipje; Referee: Erik Lambrechts

8 April 2023 32	Charleroi	3–2	Zulte Waregem	Charleroi
18:15 CEST	Bayo 66'; Mbenza 73'; Marcq 90+6'	Report	Ndour 27'; Fadera 80'	Stadium: Stade du Pays de Charleroi; Referee: Nathan Verboomen

14 April 2023 33	Standard Liège	3–1	Charleroi	Liège
20:45 CEST	Ohio 14'; Fossey 82'; Emond 90+1'	Report	Nkuba 86'	Stadium: Stade Maurice Dufrasne; Referee: Lawrence Visser

23 April 2023 34	Charleroi	2–2	Genk	Charleroi
18:30 CEST	Mbenza 3'; Nkuba 51'	Report	McKenzie 2'; Samatta 31'	Stadium: Stade du Pays de Charleroi; Referee: Bram Van Driessche

=== Belgian Cup ===
8 November 2022 Sixth round	Seraing	4–1 (a.e.t.)	Charleroi	Seraing
19:30 CET	Sambu 79'; Vagner 105', 110'; Abanda 106'	Report	Heymans 16'	Stadium: Stade du Pairay; Referee: Simon Bourdeaud'hui
