= Dion De Neve =

Belgian footballer (born 2001)

Personal information
- Full name: Dion De Neve
- Date of birth: 12 June 2001 (age 25)
- Place of birth: Aalst, Belgium
- Height: 1.80 m (5 ft 11 in)
- Positions: Winger; wing-back

Team information
- Current team: Blackburn Rovers
- Number: 14

Youth career
- –2021: Zulte Waregem

Senior career*
Years	Team	Apps	(Gls)
2021–2022	Zulte Waregem	17	(2)
2022–2025	Kortrijk	75	(5)
2025–	Blackburn Rovers	28	(0)

International career^{‡}
2017	Belgium U16	3	(0)
2018	Belgium U17	5	(0)
- * Club domestic league appearances and goals as of 00:49, 25 October 2026 (UTC) ‡ National team caps and goals as of 12 April 2018

Dion De Neve (born 12 June 2001) is a Belgian footballer who plays as a winger or wing-back for EFL Championship club Blackburn Rovers.

== Club career ==
He made his Belgian First Division A debut for Zulte Waregem on 24 July 2021 in a game against OH Leuven.

On 4 April 2022, De Neve signed a three-year contract with Kortrijk, effective from the 2022–23 season.

On 10 June 2025, De Neve signed with EFL Championship club Blackburn Rovers on a three-year contract with a club option for a one-year extension.

De Neve scored the winning goal in Blackburn Rovers' 1–0 pre-season victory over Everton. He made his Championship debut in a 1–0 defeat to West Bromwich Albion at The Hawthorns, before being substituted at half-time for Augustus Kargbo. He scored his first competitive goal for the club in a 2–1 loss to Bradford City in the EFL Cup. On 21 October, De Neve recorded his first assist for Blackburn, setting up Yūki Ōhashi for the opening goal in a 3–1 defeat to Sheffield United at Ewood Park.

De Neve was primarily deployed as a Left-back under Valérien Ismaël and was later used as a left wing-back by Michael O'Neill. De Neve started nine Championship matches and made 29 appearances in all competitions, recording one assist.

== Career statistics ==
As of match played 24 October 2026

Appearances and goals by club, season and competition
Club	Season	League			National cup (Note: Includes Belgian Cup, FA Cup)		League cup		Other		Total	
Club	Season	Division	Apps	Goals	Apps	Goals	Apps	Goals	Apps	Goals	Apps	Goals
Zulte Waregem	2021–22	Belgian Pro League	17	2	0	0	—		—		17	2
Kortrijk	2022–23	Belgian Pro League	14	1	1	0	—		—		15	1
Kortrijk	2023–24	Belgian Pro League	31	2	2	0	—		2 (Note: Appearances in relegation play-offs)	0	35	2
Kortrijk	2024–25	Belgian Pro League	30	2	2	0	—		—		32	2
Kortrijk	Total		75	5	5	0	—		2	0	82	5
Blackburn Rovers	2025–26	Championship	27	0	1	0	1	1	—		29	1
Blackburn Rovers	2026–27	Championship	1	0	0	0	1	0	—		2	0
Blackburn Rovers	Total		28	0	1	0	2	1	—		31	1
Career total			120	7	6	0	2	1	2	0	130	8
