= Avenatti =

Avenatti is a surname. Notable people with the surname include:

- Felipe Avenatti (born 1993), Uruguayan footballer
- Michael Avenatti (born 1971), American attorney and convicted felon
