= Abdelkahar Kadri =

Algerian footballer (born 2000)

Personal information
- Date of birth: 24 June 2000 (age 26)
- Place of birth: Hammamet, Algeria
- Height: 1.78 m (5 ft 10 in)
- Position: Midfielder

Team information
- Current team: KAA Gent
- Number: 37

Youth career
- 2012–2019: Paradou AC

Senior career*
Years	Team	Apps	(Gls)
2019–2021	Paradou AC	46	(5)
2021–2025	Kortrijk	100	(14)
2025–	Gent	35	(2)

International career^{‡}
2021	Algeria A'	1	(0)
2022–	Algeria	3	(0)
- * Club domestic league appearances and goals as of 25 October 2026 ‡ National team caps and goals as of 17:07 , 15 August 2025 (UTC)

Abdelkahar Kadri (Arabic: عبد القهار قادري; born 24 June 2000) is an Algerian professional footballer who plays for Belgian Pro League club Gent and the Algeria national team.

== Club career ==
On 12 August 2021, Kadri joined Belgian club Kortrijk from Paradou AC, signing a four-year contract.

On 30 July 2025, he joined fellow Belgian side Gent, signing on contract until the summer of 2029.

== International career ==
Kadri was called up to the Algeria national team in May 2022. He debutes his national career in a friendly match against Iran which is ended 2–1 for Algeria on 12 June 2022.

== Career statistics ==
=== Club ===
As of match played 25 October 2026

Appearances and goals by club, season and competition
Club	Season	League			Cup		Continental		Other		Total	
Club	Season	Division	Apps	Goals	Apps	Goals	Apps	Goals	Apps	Goals	Apps	Goals
Paradou AC	2019–20	Algerian Ligue 1	17	2	3	2	8 (Note: Appearances in CAF Confederation Cup)	2	—		28	6
Paradou AC	2020–21	Algerian Ligue 1	29	3	1	0	—		—		30	3
Paradou AC	Total		46	5	4	2	8	2	—		58	9
Kortrijk	2021–22	Belgian Pro League	22	1	3	1	—		—		25	2
Kortrijk	2022–23	Belgian Pro League	16	4	1	0	—		—		17	4
Kortrijk	2023–24	Belgian Pro League	33	4	2	0	—		2 (Note: Appearances in Relegation play-offs)	1	37	5
Kortrijk	2024–25	Belgian Pro League	29	5	2	1	—		—		31	6
Kortrijk	Total		100	14	8	2	—		2	1	110	17
Gent	2025–26	Belgian Pro League	31	1	2	1	—		—		33	2
Gent	2026–27	Belgian Pro League	4	1	1	0	5 (Note: Appearances in UEFA Conference League)	0	—		10	1
Gent	Total		35	2	3	1	5	0	—		43	3
Career total			181	21	15	5	13	2	2	1	211	29

=== International ===
As of match played 7 September 2023

Appearances and goals by national team and year
National team	Year	Apps	Goals
Algeria	2022	1	0
Algeria	2023	2	0
Total		3	0
