= Raul Opruț =

Romanian footballer (born 1998)

Personal information
- Full name: Raul Marian Opruț
- Date of birth: 4 January 1998 (age 28)
- Place of birth: Caransebeș, Romania
- Height: 1.84 m (6 ft 0 in)
- Position: Defender

Team information
- Current team: Dinamo București
- Number: 31

Youth career
- 2011–2014: LPS Banatul Timișoara
- 2014–2016: Chievo
- 2016–2018: Genoa
- 2016–2017: → Chievo (loan)

Senior career*
| Years | Team | Apps | (Gls) |
| 2018–2019 | Genoa | 0 | (0) |
| 2018–2019 | → Albissola (loan) | 25 | (0) |
| 2019–2023 | Hermannstadt | 132 | (4) |
| 2023–2025 | Kortrijk | 3 | (0) |
| 2024 | → Hermannstadt (loan) | 17 | (1) |
| 2024–2025 | → Dinamo București (loan) | 35 | (1) |
| 2025– | Dinamo București | 53 | (5) |

International career^{‡}
| 2016 | Romania U19 | 3 | (0) |
| 2020–2021 | Romania U21 | 2 | (0) |
| 2022– | Romania | 5 | (0) |
- * Club domestic league appearances and goals as of 6 November 2026 ‡ National team caps and goals as of 9 October 2025

Raul Marian Opruț (born 4 January 1998) is a Romanian professional footballer who plays as a defender for Liga I club Dinamo București and the Romania national team.

== Club career ==
=== Early career ===
Opruț started his youth career in the academies of LPS Banatul Timișoara, Chievo, and Genoa. He made his senior debut while on loan at Serie C club Albissola in the 2018–19 season, starting in a 2–3 home league loss to Olbia on 19 September 2018.

=== Hermannstadt ===
On 12 July 2019, Opruț returned to his native country by joining Liga I team Hermannstadt. He made his league debut on 28 July, in a 2–3 away loss to Viitorul Constanța. On 10 January 2021, he scored his first senior goal against the same opponent, in a 1–2 away Liga I defeat.

=== Kortrijk ===
On 31 July 2023, Opruț signed a three-year contract with Belgian side Kortrijk for a fee of €400,000 plus 15% interest. On 16 January 2024, he was sent on loan to his previous club Hermannstadt for the remainder of the campaign.

=== Dinamo București ===
On 19 June 2024, it was announced that Opruț went on a season loan to Dinamo București. He made his debut for the team on 14 July, in the 2-3 loss against CFR Cluj. On 2 August, he scored his first goal for Dinamo in the 4–1 home win against Gloria Buzău, being named in the Liga 1 Team of the Week. He imposed himself as the first choice left-back, appearing in 38 games in a season where the team finished 6th. On 15 May 2025, the club announced signing Opruț on a long time contract, until 2029, for a reported fee of €200,000.

His influence in the team continued to grow in the 2025-26 season, when he scored 6 goals in 45 appearances, including a brace against his former team Hermannstadt. At the end of the season, following a finish in 4th place for Dinamo, he was named in Liga I Team of the Season.

== International career ==
Opruț made his debut for the Romania national team on 17 November 2022, coming on as a 60th-minute substitute for Bogdan Vătăjelu in a 1–2 friendly loss to Slovenia.

== Career statistics ==
=== Club ===
As of match played 6 November 2026

Appearances and goals by club, season and competition
| Club | Season | League | | | National cup (Note: Includes Coppa Italia Serie C, Cupa României) | | Europe | | Other | | Total | |
| Club | Season | Division | Apps | Goals | Apps | Goals | Apps | Goals | Apps | Goals | Apps | Goals |
|---|---|---|---|---|---|---|---|---|---|---|---|---|
| Albissola (loan) | 2018–19 | Serie C | 25 | 0 | 3 | 0 | — | | — | | 28 | 0 |
| Hermannstadt | 2019–20 | Liga I | 33 | 0 | 0 | 0 | — | | — | | 33 | 0 |
| Hermannstadt | 2020–21 | Liga I | 37 | 1 | 0 | 0 | — | | 2 (Note: Appearance in Liga I promotion-relegation play-offs) | 0 | 39 | 1 |
| Hermannstadt | 2021–22 | Liga II | 26 | 1 | 1 | 0 | — | | — | | 27 | 1 |
| Hermannstadt | 2022–23 | Liga I | 34 | 2 | 5 | 0 | — | | — | | 39 | 2 |
| Hermannstadt | 2023–24 | Liga I | 2 | 0 | 0 | 0 | — | | — | | 2 | 0 |
| Hermannstadt | Total | | 132 | 4 | 6 | 0 | — | | 2 | 0 | 140 | 4 |
| Kortrijk | 2023–24 | Belgian Pro League | 3 | 0 | 0 | 0 | — | | — | | 3 | 0 |
| Hermannstadt (loan) | 2023–24 | Liga I | 17 | 1 | 0 | 0 | — | | — | | 17 | 1 |
| Dinamo București (loan) | 2024–25 | Liga I | 35 | 1 | 3 | 0 | — | | — | | 38 | 1 |
| Dinamo București | 2025–26 | Liga I | 39 | 5 | 5 | 1 | — | | 1 (Note: Appearances in Liga I European play-offs) | 0 | 45 | 6 |
| Dinamo București | 2026–27 | Liga I | 14 | 0 | 2 | 0 | — | | — | | 16 | 0 |
| Dinamo București | Total | | 88 | 6 | 10 | 1 | — | | 1 | 0 | 99 | 7 |
| Career Total | | | 265 | 11 | 19 | 1 | — | | 3 | 0 | 287 | 12 |

=== International ===
As of match played 9 October 2025

Appearances and goals by national team and year
| National team | Year | Apps | Goals |
|---|---|---|---|
Romania
| Romania | 2022 | 2 | 0 |
| Romania | 2023 | 1 | 0 |
| Romania | 2024 | 1 | 0 |
| Romania | 2025 | 1 | 0 |
| Total | | 5 | 0 |

== Honours ==
Individual

- Liga I Team of the Season: 2025–26
