= Martin Wasinski =

Belgian footballer (born 2004)

Personal information
- Full name: Martin Jean Wasinski
- Date of birth: 7 April 2004 (age 22)
- Place of birth: Liege, Belgium
- Height: 1.85 m (6 ft 1 in)
- Position: Centre-back

Team information
- Current team: Almere City (on loan from Schalke 04)
- Number: 2

Youth career
- 2010–2014: US Hesbignonne
- 2014–2018: Stade Waremmien
- 2018–2021: Charleroi

Senior career*
Years	Team	Apps	(Gls)
2021–2024	Charleroi	22	(0)
2023–2024	→ KV Kortrijk (loan)	22	(1)
2024–	Schalke 04	1	(0)
2024–	Schalke 04 II	11	(0)
2025	→ Jong Genk (loan)	10	(0)
2025–2026	→ RFC Liège (loan)	28	(0)
2026–	→ Almere City (loan)	0	(0)

International career
2019–2020	Belgium U16	3	(0)
2021	Belgium U18	2	(0)
2021–2023	Belgium U19	9	(0)
2022–2023	Belgium U20	3	(0)
- * Club domestic league appearances and goals as of 21 August 2026

Martin Jean Wasinski (born 7 April 2004) is a Belgian professional footballer who plays as a centre-back for Eerste Divisie club Almere City, on loan from Bundesliga club Schalke 04.

== Club career ==
=== Charleroi ===
Having joined Charleroi at under-15 level, he progressed through the club's youth ranks, making his professional debut in the 2–2 Belgian First Division A draw with Zulte Waregem on 22 August 2021, aged 17. Used in a variety of positions across defence and midfield, and having to split his time between football and school, Wasinski made 15 league appearances during the 2021–22 season. In August 2022, Wasinski extended his contract with Charleroi until summer 2025.

==== Loan to KV Kortrijk ====
On 6 January 2023, he was loaned to KV Kortrijk until the end of the 2022–23 season. On 17 July 2023, it was announced that the loan-deal was extended for the next season also.

=== Schalke 04 ===
On 21 June 2024, German 2. Bundesliga club Schalke 04 announced that they had signed Wasinski on a free transfer until 30 June 2028.

==== Loan to Genk ====
On 24 January 2025, he was loaned to Genk until the end of the season with an option to make the move permanent, where he was initially supposed to play for their second team Jong Genk in the Challenger Pro League.

==== Loan to RFC Liège ====
On 2 September 2025, he moved to RFC Liège on a season-long loan with an option to buy.

==== Loan to Almere City ====
On 25 August 2026, Wasinski was loaned to Almere City in the Dutch second tier, with an option to buy.

== International career ==
Born in Belgium, Wasinski is of Polish descent. He was called up to the Belgian under-16 team in November 2019 for a youth tournament in Paraguay. He has also represented Belgium at under-18, under-19 and under-20 levels.

== Career statistics ==
As of match played 21 August 2026

Appearances and goals by club, season and competition
Club	Season	League			Cup (Note: Includes Belgian Cup, DFB-Pokal)		Other		Total	
Club	Season	Division	Apps	Goals	Apps	Goals	Apps	Goals	Apps	Goals
Charleroi	2021–22	Belgian Pro League	15	0	1	0	—		16	0
Charleroi	2022–23	Belgian Pro League	7	0	1	0	—		8	0
Charleroi	Total		22	0	2	0	—		24	0
Kortrijk (loan)	2022–23	Belgian Pro League	15	1	1	0	—		16	1
Kortrijk (loan)	2023–24	Belgian Pro League	7	0	1	0	—		8	0
Kortrijk (loan)	Total		22	1	2	0	—		24	1
Schalke 04	2024–25	2. Bundesliga	1	0	2	0	—		3	0
Schalke 04 II	2024–25	Regionalliga West	5	0	—		—		5	0
Schalke 04 II	2025–26	Regionalliga West	4	0	—		—		4	0
Schalke 04 II	2026–27	Regionalliga West	2	0	—		—		2	0
Schalke 04 II	Total		11	0	—		—		11	0
Jong Genk (loan)	2024–25	Challenger Pro League	10	0	—		—		10	0
RFC Liège (loan)	2025–26	Challenger Pro League	28	0	2	1	2 (Note: Appearances in Challenger Pro League promotion play-offs)	0	32	1
Almere City (loan)	2026–27	Eerste Divisie	0	0	0	0	—		0	0
Career total			94	1	8	1	2	0	104	2
