= Habib Keïta =

Malian footballer (born 2002)

Personal information
- Full name: Habib Ali Keïta
- Date of birth: 5 February 2002 (age 24)
- Place of birth: Bamako, Mali
- Height: 1.82 m (6 ft 0 in)
- Position: Midfielder

Youth career
- –2020: JMG Academy Bamako
- 2020–2021: Lyon

Senior career*
Years	Team	Apps	(Gls)
2020–2022	Lyon B	17	(2)
2020–2023	Lyon	4	(0)
2022–2023	→ Kortrijk (loan)	18	(1)
2023	Clermont B	1	(0)
2023–2026	Clermont	58	(2)
2025–2026	→ Kocaelispor (loan)	28	(1)
2026	Kocaelispor	0	(0)
- * Club domestic league appearances and goals as of 29 August 2026

Habib Ali Keïta (born 5 February 2002) is a Malian professional football player who plays as a midfielder.

== Career ==
Habib Keïta joined Lyon Academy in October 2020, arriving from Mali, where he was in the same youth system as his Lyon teammate Sinaly Diomandé. His transfer fee was of €1 million, not including bonuses.

He made his professional debut for Lyon on the 8 May 2021, replacing Lucas Paquetá in a 4–1 home Ligue 1 win against Lorient.

For the 2022–23 season, Keïta joined Kortrijk in Belgium on loan.

On 4 July 2023, Keïta signed for Ligue 1 club Clermont on a four-year contract. The transfer was for an initial fee of €1.2 million with potential future add-ons worth €1 million as well as Lyon receiving 20% of future profit.

On 12 September 2025, Keïta was loaned to Turkish club Kocaelispor for the 2025–26 season, with an option to buy.

Keïta was consistently starting for the club during the 2025–26 season, and Kocaelispor acquired his rights permanently at the end of the season. However, Keïta did not arrive to the club for the pre-season, or even after the 2026–27 season started and the first three games were played. On 5 September 2026, Kocaelispor terminated his contract and announced the club will file lawsuits in Court of Arbitration for Sport for compensation if Keïta joins any other club.

== Career statistics ==
=== Club ===
As of match played 23 August 2025

Appearances and goals by club, season and competition
Club	Season	League			National Cup (Note: Including Coupe de France, Belgian Cup)		Europe		Other		Total	
Club	Season	Division	Apps	Goals	Apps	Goals	Apps	Goals	Apps	Goals	Apps	Goals
Lyon B	2020–21	National 2	1	0	0	0	—		—		1	0
Lyon B	2021–22	National 2	16	2	0	0	—		—		16	2
Lyon B	Total		17	2	0	0	—		—		17	2
Lyon	2020–21	Ligue 1	1	0	0	0	—		—		1	0
Lyon	2021–22	Ligue 1	3	0	0	0	3 (Note: Appearance(s) in UEFA Europa League)	0	—		6	0
Lyon	Total		4	0	0	0	3	0	—		7	0
KV Kortrijk (loan)	2022–23	JPL	18	0	3	1	—		—		21	1
Clermont B	2023–24	National 3	1	0	0	0	—		—		1	0
Clermont	2023–24	Ligue 1	27	1	2	0	—		—		29	1
Clermont	2024–25	Ligue 2	27	1	3	0	—		—		30	1
Clermont	2025–26	Ligue 2	4	0	0	0	—		—		4	0
Clermont	Total		58	2	5	0	—		—		63	2
Career total			98	4	8	1	3	0	—		109	5
