= Sambou Sissoko (Malian footballer) =

Malian footballer

Personal information
- Full name: Sambou Sissoko
- Date of birth: 29 June 2000 (age 26)
- Place of birth: Kayes, Mali
- Height: 1.81 m (5 ft 11 in)
- Position: Defensive midfielder

Team information
- Current team: Čukarički
- Number: 14

Senior career*
Years	Team	Apps	(Gls)
2019	USFAS Bamako		
2019–2020	Djoliba AC		
2020–2023	Kortrijk	17	(0)
2022–2023	→ Čukarički (loan)	24	(0)
2023–	Čukarički	124	(4)

International career^{‡}
2019	Mali U20	8	(0)
- * Club domestic league appearances and goals as of 25 July 2026 ‡ National team caps and goals as of 7 June 2019

Sambou Sissoko (born 29 June 2000) is a Malian professional footballer who plays as a defensive midfielder for Serbian SuperLiga club Čukarički.

== Club career ==
On 5 October 2020, Sissoko signed a two-year contract with Kortrijk in Belgium. Due to visa complications, he did not arrive to the club until two months later.

He made his Belgian First Division A debut for Kortrijk on 23 January 2021 in a game against Cercle Brugge.

On 15 September 2022, Sissoko joined Čukarički in Serbia on loan.During the 2025–26 season, Sissoko made 33 appearances across all competitions and scored two goals. On 30 June 2026, he signed a one-year contract extension to remain with the club.

== International career ==
Sissoko represented Mali at the 2019 Africa U-20 Cup of Nations, which they won, and the 2019 FIFA U-20 World Cup, where Mali reached the quarterfinals. He scored the decisive goal in the penalty shoot-out to eliminate Argentina in the Round of 16.

== Honours ==
Mali U20

- U-20 Africa Cup of Nations: 2019
