= João Silva (footballer, born 1999) =

Portuguese footballer

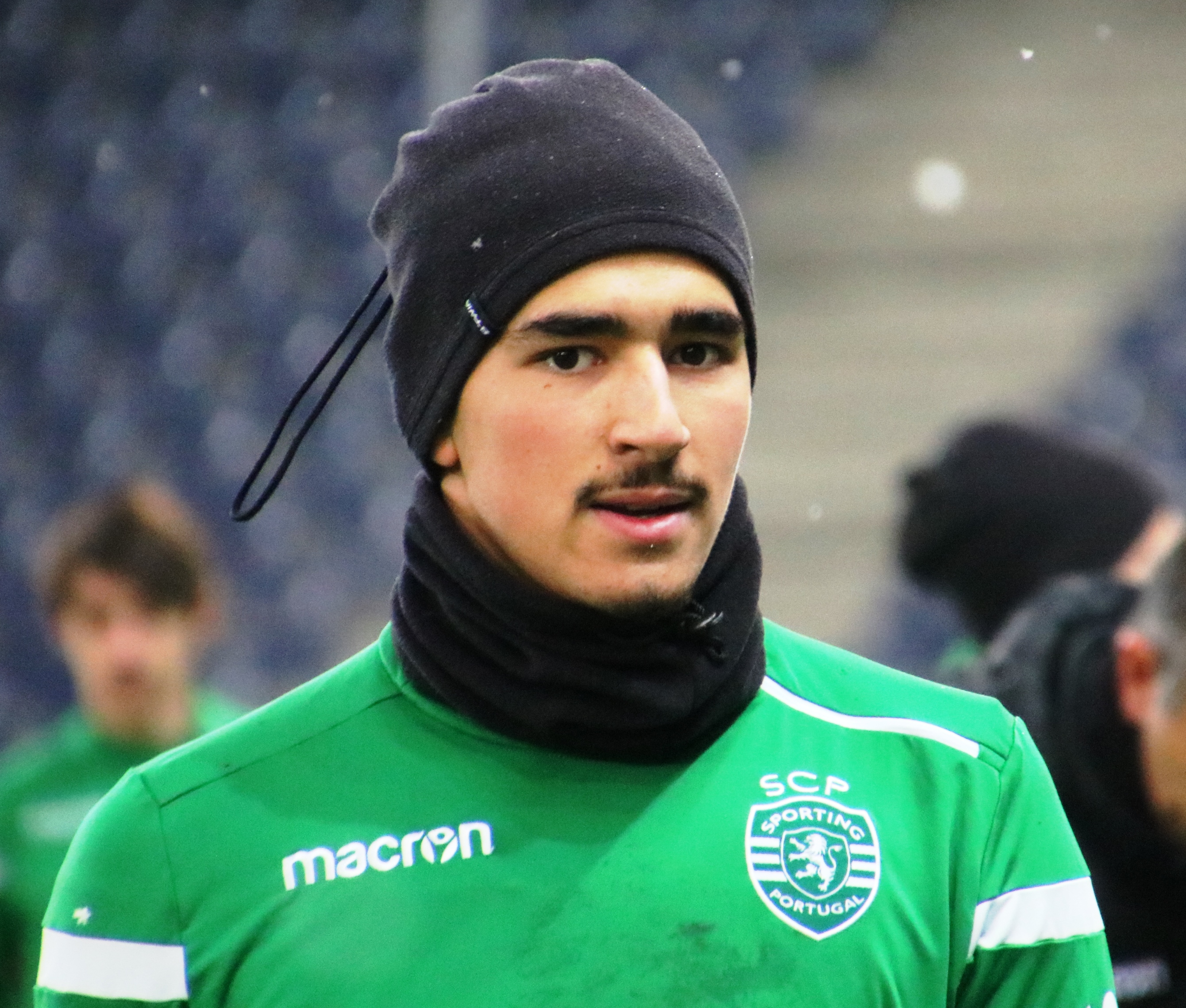
- Silva with Sporting U19 in 2018

Personal information
- Full name: João Pedro Eira Antunes da Silva
- Date of birth: 14 January 1999 (age 27)
- Place of birth: Braga, Portugal
- Height: 1.89 m (6 ft 2 in)
- Position: Centre-back

Team information
- Current team: Orenburg
- Number: 44

Youth career
- 2009–2015: Braga
- 2014–2015: → Palmeiras Braga (loan)
- 2015–2020: Sporting CP

Senior career*
| Years | Team | Apps | (Gls) |
| 2020–2021 | Sporting CP B | 11 | (1) |
| 2020–2021 | Sporting CP | 0 | (0) |
| 2021–2022 | Alavés | 0 | (0) |
| 2021–2022 | → Istra 1961 (loan) | 40 | (1) |
| 2022–2025 | Kortrijk | 74 | (3) |
| 2025–2026 | Sport Recife | 18 | (1) |
| 2026 | → Tondela (loan) | 12 | (1) |
| 2026– | Orenburg | 2 | (0) |
- * Club domestic league appearances and goals as of 8 November 2026

João Pedro Eira Antunes da Silva (born 14 January 1999) is a Portuguese professional footballer who plays as a centre-back for Russian Premier League club Orenburg.

== Career ==
Born in Braga, Silva began as a youth at hometown club S.C. Braga before moving to Sporting CP's academy in 2015. He began playing senior football for the B-team in the Campeonato de Portugal in 2020–21. He was one of several players called up to the first team in September 2020 for a UEFA Europa League third qualifying game at home to Aberdeen, due to a COVID-19 outbreak; he was unused in the 1–0 win on 24 September. The following 15 January, he had his one Primeira Liga call-up, remaining on the bench for a 1–1 draw with Rio Ave F.C. at the Estádio José Alvalade.

In January 2021, Silva transferred to NK Istra 1961 in the Croatian top league, on loan from Spanish club Deportivo Alavés, under the same ownership. He totalled 44 games, but was unused in their 6–3 loss to GNK Dinamo Zagreb in the cup final on 19 May; his first senior goal came on 2 October to open a 6–3 home loss to local rivals HNK Rijeka.

On 15 July 2022, Silva signed a three-year deal with Kortrijk in the Belgian Pro League.

On 13 February 2025, after two-and-a-half years in Belgium, Silva moved to Brazil, joining recently-promoted Série A club Sport Recife on a two-year contract. At the end of the 2025 season, following Sport's relegation to Série B, he was considered surplus to requirements, along with countryman Sérgio Oliveira.

On 30 January 2026, Silva returned to Portugal, joining Primeira Liga club Tondela on loan until the end of the 2025–26 season.

On 10 September 2026, Silva signed with Orenburg in Russia.

== Career statistics ==
As of 8 November 2026

| Club | Season | League | | | Cup | | Continental | | Other | | Total | |
| Club | Season | Division | Apps | Goals | Apps | Goals | Apps | Goals | Apps | Goals | Apps | Goals |
|---|---|---|---|---|---|---|---|---|---|---|---|---|
| Sporting CP B | 2020–21 | Campeonato de Portugal | 11 | 1 | — | | — | | — | | 11 | 1 |
| Sporting CP | 2020–21 | Primeira Liga | 0 | 0 | 0 | 0 | 0 | 0 | 0 | 0 | 0 | 0 |
| Istra 1961 (loan) | 2020–21 | First Football League | 10 | 0 | 1 | 0 | — | | — | | 11 | 0 |
| Istra 1961 (loan) | 2021–22 | First Football League | 30 | 1 | 3 | 0 | — | | — | | 33 | 1 |
| Istra 1961 (loan) | Total | | 40 | 1 | 4 | 0 | 0 | 0 | 0 | 0 | 44 | 1 |
| Kortrijk | 2022–23 | Belgian Pro League | 22 | 2 | 3 | 0 | — | | — | | 25 | 2 |
| Kortrijk | 2023–24 | Belgian Pro League | 30 | 0 | 2 | 0 | — | | 8 (Note: Appearances in relegation play-offs and relegation/promotion play-offs) | 2 | 40 | 2 |
| Kortrijk | 2024–25 | Belgian Pro League | 22 | 1 | 1 | 0 | — | | — | | 23 | 1 |
| Kortrijk | Total | | 74 | 3 | 6 | 0 | 0 | 0 | 8 | 2 | 88 | 5 |
| Sport Recife | 2025 | Série A | 14 | 0 | 1 | 0 | — | | 7 (Note: Four appearances, one goal in Campeonato Pernambucano, three appearances in Copa do Nordeste) | 1 | 22 | 1 |
| Tondela (loan) | 2025–26 | Primeira Liga | 12 | 1 | — | | — | | — | | 12 | 1 |
| Orenburg | 2026–27 | Russian Premier League | 2 | 0 | 1 | 0 | — | | — | | 3 | 0 |
| Career total | | | 153 | 6 | 12 | 0 | 0 | 0 | 15 | 3 | 180 | 9 |
