= Tom Vandenberghe =

Belgian footballer

Personal information
- Date of birth: 17 August 1992 (age 34)
- Place of birth: Waregem, Belgium
- Height: 1.90 m (6 ft 3 in)
- Position: Goalkeeper

Team information
- Current team: Gent
- Number: 32

Senior career*
Years	Team	Apps	(Gls)
2014–2015	Sparta Petegem		
2015–2022	Deinze	161	(0)
2022–2025	Kortrijk	47	(1)
2025–	Gent	13	(0)
- * Club domestic league appearances and goals as of 5 June 2025

Tom Vandenberghe (born 17 August 1992) is a Belgian footballer who plays as a goalkeeper for Gent in the Belgian Pro League.

== Career ==
=== Deinze ===
Vandenberghe signed with Deinze in 2015. He made his debut for the club on 24 October 2015 in a 1–1 draw with Antwerp. In March 2019, Vandenberghe signed a three-year extension with the club.

=== Kortrijk ===
On 9 February 2022, Vandenberghe signed a three-year contract with Kortrijk, beginning in the 2022–23 season.

=== Gent ===
On 7 January 2025, Vandenberghe joined Gent on a 2.5-year contract.

== Career statistics ==
=== Club ===
As of match played 25 May 2025

Appearances and goals by club, season and competition
Club	Season	League			Cup		Other		Total	
Club	Season	Division	Apps	Goals	Apps	Goals	Apps	Goals	Apps	Goals
Deinze	2015–16	Challenger Pro League	17	0	0	0	—		17	0
Deinze	2016–17	Belgian First Amateur Division	30	0	1	0	—		31	0
Deinze	2017–18	Belgian First Amateur Division	30	0	—		4	0	34	0
Deinze	2018–19	Belgian First Amateur Division	30	0	3	0	4	0	37	0
Deinze	2019–20	Belgian First Amateur Division	24	0	—		—		24	0
Deinze	2020–21	Challenger Pro League	10	0	1	0	—		11	0
Deinze	2021–22	Challenger Pro League	22	0	1	0	—		23	0
Deinze	Total		161	0	6	0	8	0	175	0
Kortrijk	2022–23	Belgian Pro League	17	0	3	0	—		20	0
Kortrijk	2023–24	Belgian Pro League	21	1	2	0	0	0	23	1
Kortrijk	2024–25	Belgian Pro League	9	0	1	0	—		10	0
Kortrijk	Total		47	1	6	0	—		53	1
Gent	2024–25	Belgian Pro League	13	0	—		—		13	0
Career total			221	1	12	0	8	0	241	1
