= Ryan Alebiosu =

Footballer (born 2001)

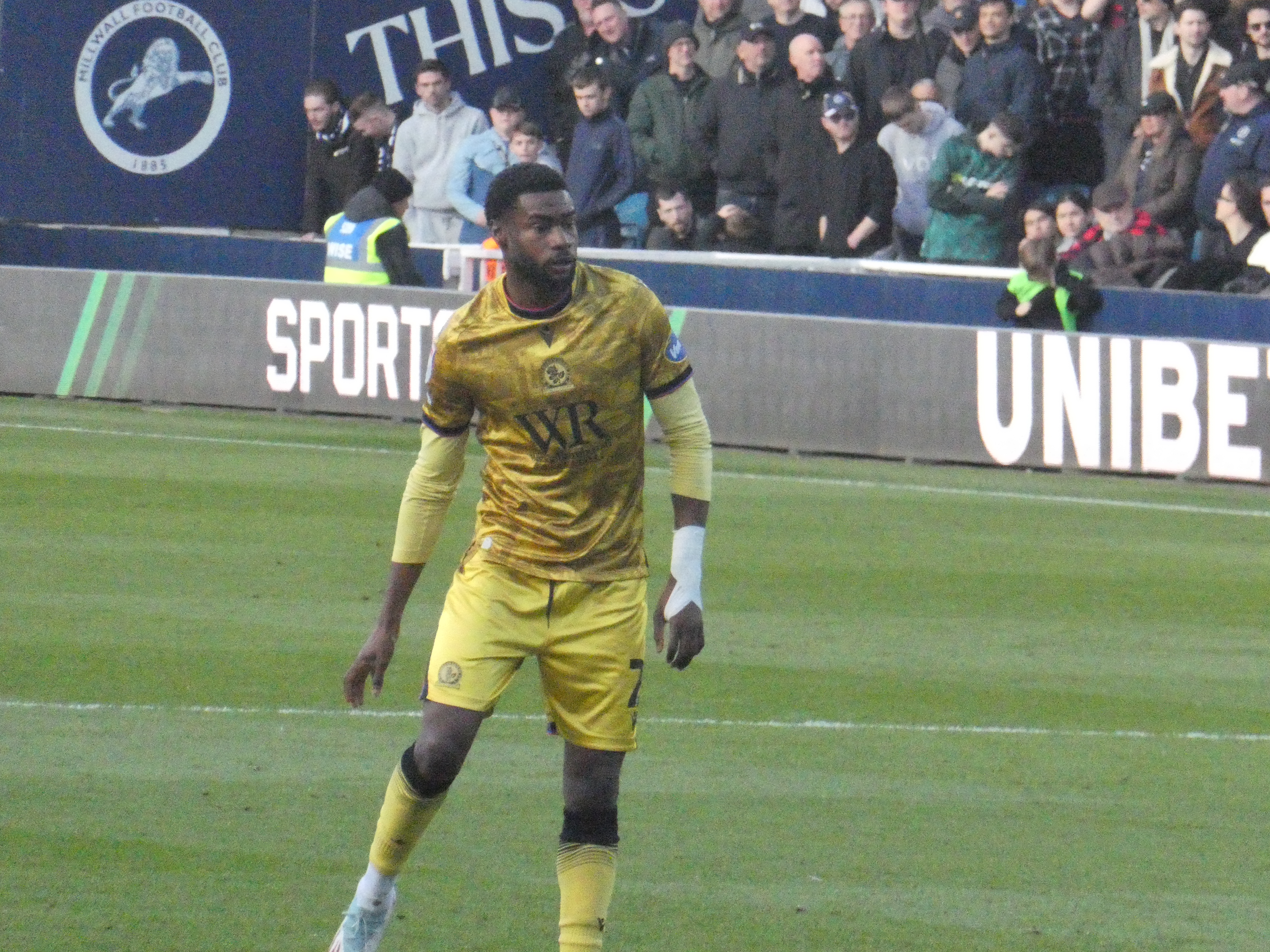
- Alebiosu playing for Blackburn Rovers in 2026.

Personal information
- Full name: Ryan Fiyinfoluwa Alebiosu
- Date of birth: 17 December 2001 (age 24)
- Place of birth: Islington, England
- Height: 1.88 m (6 ft 2 in)
- Position: Right back

Team information
- Current team: Blackburn Rovers
- Number: 2

Youth career
- 2010–2021: Arsenal

Senior career*
Years	Team	Apps	(Gls)
2021–2023	Arsenal	0	(0)
2022	→ Crewe Alexandra (loan)	6	(0)
2022–2023	→ Kilmarnock (loan)	23	(0)
2023–2025	Kortrijk	25	(0)
2025	→ St Mirren (loan)	13	(0)
2025–	Blackburn Rovers	53	(1)

International career^{‡}
2025–	Nigeria	1	(0)
Medal record
Men's football
Representing Nigeria
Africa Cup of Nations
Third place	2025
- * Club domestic league appearances and goals as of 21:27, 3 November 2026 (UTC) ‡ National team caps and goals as of 18:03, 30 December 2025 (UTC)

Ryan Fiyinfoluwa Alebiosu (born 17 December 2001) is a professional footballer who plays as a right back for EFL Championship club Blackburn Rovers. Born in England, he represents Nigeria at international level.

== Club career ==
Born in London, Alebiosu joined Arsenal in 2010, at the age of 8, turning professional in 2020.

He signed on loan for EFL League One side Crewe Alexandra in January 2022, and made his full professional debut in Crewe's 1–0 league defeat at Gillingham on 1 February 2022. He moved on loan to Kilmarnock in July 2022.

In September 2023 he signed for Belgian Pro League club Kortrijk. On 3 February 2025, Alebiosu moved on loan to St Mirren.

On 11 July 2025, Alebiosu signed for EFL Championship side Blackburn Rovers on an initial three-year contract with the option of an extra 12 months. On 25 October 2025, Alebiosu scored his first goal for Blackburn Rovers, an equaliser in a 2–1 victory over Southampton.

== International career ==
Alebiosu is eligible to represent both England and Nigeria at international level, having been born in England to Nigerian parents. He obtained a Nigerian passport ahead of the 2025 Africa Cup of Nations, and was named in Nigeria’s 28-man final squad for the tournament, marking his first senior call-up for the Super Eagles.

On 30 December 2025, Alebiosu made his senior debut for Nigeria, playing the full match in their final group-stage game, a 3–1 win over the Uganda, which secured Nigeria’s progression to the round of 16.

== Career statistics ==
=== Club ===
As of match played 3 November 2026

Club	Season	Division	League		National cup (Note: Includes Scottish Cup, Belgian Cup, FA Cup)		League cup (Note: Includes Scottish League Cup, EFL Cup)		Other		Total	
Club	Season	Division	Apps	Goals	Apps	Goals	Apps	Goals	Apps	Goals	Apps	Goals
Arsenal U21s	2021–22	–	–		–		–		4 (Note: Appearances in the EFL Trophy.)	0	4	0
Arsenal	2021–22	Premier League	0	0	0	0	0	0	0	0	0	0
Arsenal	2022–23	Premier League	0	0	0	0	0	0	0	0	0	0
Arsenal	Total		0	0	0	0	0	0	0	0	0	0
Crewe Alexandra (loan)	2021–22	League One	6	0	0	0	0	0	0	0	6	0
Kilmarnock (loan)	2022–23	Scottish Premiership	23	0	2	0	4	0	–		29	0
KV Kortrijk	2023–24	Belgian Pro League	12	0	0	0	–		–		12	0
KV Kortrijk	2024–25	Belgian Pro League	13	0	0	0	–		–		13	0
KV Kortrijk	Total		25	0	0	0	0	0	0	0	25	0
St Mirren (loan)	2024–25	Scottish Premiership	13	0	1	0	0	0	–		14	0
Blackburn Rovers	2025–26	Championship	39	1	0	0	1	0	–		40	1
Blackburn Rovers	2026–27	Championship	14	0	0	0	1	0	–		15	0
Blackburn Rovers	Total		53	1	0	0	2	0	0	0	55	1
Career total			120	1	3	0	6	0	4	0	133	1

=== International ===
As of match played 30 December 2025

Appearances and goals by national team and year
National team	Year	Apps	Goals
Nigeria	2025	1	0
Total		1	0

== Honours ==
Nigeria

- Africa Cup of Nations third place: 2025
