= Youssef Challouk =

Belgian footballer

Personal information
- Date of birth: 28 August 1995 (age 31)
- Place of birth: Boom, Belgium
- Height: 1.73 m (5 ft 8 in)
- Position: Midfielder

Senior career*
Years	Team	Apps	(Gls)
–2016	Rupel Boom		
2016–2017	Heist	34	(18)
2017–2022	Deinze	130	(43)
2022–2026	Kortrijk	15	(0)
2022–2023	→ RWDM47 (loan)	27	(6)
2024–2025	→ Zulte Waregem (loan)	15	(2)
- * Club domestic league appearances and goals as of 19 April 2026

Youssef Challouk (born 28 August 1995) is a Belgian footballer who plays as a midfielder.

== Club career ==
On 15 February 2022, Challouk signed a four-year contract with Kortrijk, beginning in the 2022–23 season. On 7 September 2022, Challouk moved on loan to RWDM47.

On 4 September 2024, Challouk was loaned to Zulte Waregem, with an option to buy.

== Personal life ==
Born in Belgium, Challouk is of Moroccan descent. “
