= Dylan Mbayo =

Belgian footballer (born 2001)

Personal information
- Date of birth: 11 October 2001 (age 25)
- Place of birth: Belgium
- Height: 1.75 m (5 ft 9 in)
- Position: Winger

Team information
- Current team: PEC Zwolle

Youth career
- Lokeren

Senior career*
Years	Team	Apps	(Gls)
2019	Lokeren	6	(1)
2019–2021	Gent	8	(0)
2021–2025	Kortrijk	56	(3)
2024	→ Dordrecht (loan)	17	(2)
2024–2025	→ PEC Zwolle (loan)	34	(4)
2025–	PEC Zwolle	14	(0)
2026	→ Laval (loan)	14	(1)

International career
2018–2019	Belgium U18	3	(0)
2019–2020	Belgium U19	10	(1)
- * Club domestic league appearances and goals as of 12 May 2026

Dylan Mbayo (born 11 October 2001) is a Belgian professional footballer who plays for Eredivisie club PEC Zwolle.

== Early life ==
Born in Belgium, Mbayo is of Congolese descent. He is the son of retired footballer Marcel Kimemba Mbayo, who also played for Lokeren.

== Club career ==
On 3 August 2021, Mbayo signed a five-year contract with Kortrijk.

On 5 January 2024, he joined Dordrecht in the Netherlands on loan. On 7 August 2024, Mbayo returned to the Netherlands and joined PEC Zwolle on loan with an option to buy. On 25 May 2025, PEC Zwolle made the transfer permanent and signed a one-season contract with Mbayo. On 19 January 2026, PEC Zwolle extended his contract for the 2026–27 season and loaned him to Laval in France for 6 months.

== Career statistics ==
=== Club ===
As of match played 23 August 2023

Appearances and goals by club, season and competition
Club	Season	League			National Cup (Note: Includes Belgian Cup)		Europe		Other		Total	
Club	Season	Division	Apps	Goals	Apps	Goals	Apps	Goals	Apps	Goals	Apps	Goals
Sporting Lokeren	2018–19	Belgian Pro League	2	0	0	0	—		—		2	0
Sporting Lokeren	2019–20	Challenger Pro League	4	1	1	0	—		—		5	1
Sporting Lokeren	Total		6	1	1	0	—		—		7	1
Gent	2019–20	Belgian Pro League	4	0	2	1	0	0	—		6	1
Gent	2020–21	Belgian Pro League	4	0	1	1	0	0	—		5	1
Gent	Total		8	0	3	2	0	0	—		11	2
Kortrijk	2021–22	Belgian Pro League	28	2	3	0	—		—		31	2
Kortrijk	2022–23	Belgian Pro League	19	1	1	0	—		—		20	1
Kortrijk	Total		47	3	4	0	—		—		51	3
Career total			61	4	8	2	0	0	—		69	6

== Honours ==
Individual

- Eredivisie Player of the Month: November 2024
- Eredivisie Team of the Month: November 2024
