= Ryotaro Tsunoda =

Japanese footballer

Ryotaro Tsunoda 角田 涼太朗
Personal information
- Date of birth: 27 June 1999 (age 27)
- Place of birth: Saitama, Japan
- Height: 1.85 m (6 ft 1 in)
- Positions: Centre-back; left-back

Team information
- Current team: Yokohama F. Marinos
- Number: 22

Youth career
- Kitaurawa SSS
- Urawa Red Diamonds
- 2015–2017: Maebashi Ikuei High School

College career
| Years | Team | Apps | (Gls) |
| 2018–2020 | University of Tsukuba | | |

Senior career*
| Years | Team | Apps | (Gls) |
| 2020–2024 | Yokohama F. Marinos | 36 | (0) |
| 2024–2025 | Cardiff City | 0 | (0) |
| 2024 | → Kortrijk (loan) | 9 | (0) |
| 2025 | → Kortrijk (loan) | 12 | (0) |
| 2025– | Yokohama F. Marinos | 25 | (2) |

International career^{‡}
- Japan U18
| 2019 | Japan U20 | 2 | (0) |
- * Club domestic league appearances and goals as of 11 August 2026 ‡ National team caps and goals as of 17:04, 13 October 2020 (UTC)

Ryotaro Tsunoda (角田 涼太朗, Tsunoda Ryotaro; born 27 June 1999) is a Japanese professional footballer who plays as a centre-back or a left-back for Yokohama F. Marinos.

== Club career ==
On 23 January 2024, Tsunoda signed for Championship club Cardiff City. Upon his arrival at the club, he immediately joined Belgian Pro League club KV Kortrijk on loan for the remainder of the season. On 16 March, Tsunoda suffered a hamstring injury in match against Anderlecht and missed the remainder of the season.

On 6 January 2025, Tsunoda returned to Kortrijk on a new loan.

== International career ==
In March 2023, Tsunoda was called up to the Japan national team for the first time by manager Hajime Moriyasu to play in the 2023 Kirin Challenge Cup.

== Career statistics ==
=== Club ===
As of 16 March 2024

Appearances and goals by club, season and competition
| Club | Season | League | | | National cup (Note: Includes Emperor's Cup, FA Cup, Belgian Cup) | | League cup (Note: Includes J.League Cup, EFL Cup) | | Other | | Total | |
| Club | Season | Division | Apps | Goals | Apps | Goals | Apps | Goals | Apps | Goals | Apps | Goals |
|---|---|---|---|---|---|---|---|---|---|---|---|---|
| University of Tsukuba | 2020 | – | | | 5 | 0 | – | | 0 | 0 | 5 | 0 |
| Yokohama F. Marinos | 2020 | J1 League | 1 | 0 | 0 | 0 | 0 | 0 | 0 | 0 | 1 | 0 |
| Yokohama F. Marinos | 2021 | J1 League | 1 | 0 | 0 | 0 | 0 | 0 | 0 | 0 | 1 | 0 |
| Yokohama F. Marinos | 2022 | J1 League | 18 | 0 | 2 | 0 | 2 | 0 | 5 (Note: Appearances in the AFC Champions League) | 1 | 27 | 1 |
| Yokohama F. Marinos | 2023 | J1 League | 16 | 0 | 0 | 0 | 3 | 0 | 4 (Note: One appearance in Japanese Super Cup, three appearances in AFC Champions League) | 0 | 23 | 0 |
| Yokohama F. Marinos | Total | | 36 | 0 | 2 | 0 | 5 | 0 | 9 | 1 | 52 | 1 |
| Cardiff City | 2023–24 | EFL Championship | 0 | 0 | 0 | 0 | 0 | 0 | 0 | 0 | 0 | 0 |
| Cardiff City | 2024–25 | EFL Championship | 0 | 0 | 0 | 0 | 0 | 0 | 0 | 0 | 0 | 0 |
| Cardiff City | Total | | 0 | 0 | 0 | 0 | 0 | 0 | 0 | 0 | 0 | 0 |
| Kortrijk (loan) | 2023–24 | Belgian First Division | 9 | 0 | 0 | 0 | 0 | 0 | 0 | 0 | 9 | 0 |
| Career total | | | 45 | 0 | 7 | 0 | 5 | 0 | 9 | 1 | 66 | 1 |

== Honours ==
Yokohama F. Marinos

- J1 League: 2022
