= Christalino Atemona =

German footballer (born 2002)

Personal information
- Date of birth: 6 May 2002 (age 24)
- Place of birth: Zwiesel, Germany
- Height: 1.87 m (6 ft 2 in)
- Position: Centre-back

Team information
- Current team: Bravo
- Number: 3

Youth career
- 2013–2014: Reinickendorfer Berlin
- 2014–2020: Hertha BSC

Senior career*
Years	Team	Apps	(Gls)
2020–2023	Hertha BSC II	16	(1)
2023–2024	Kortrijk	12	(0)
2025–	Bravo	14	(1)

International career^{‡}
2019	Germany U18	1	(0)
2020	Germany U19	1	(0)
2021–2022	Germany U20	4	(0)
- * Club domestic league appearances and goals as of 25 June 2025 ‡ National team caps and goals as of 20:14, 12 March 2023 (UTC)

Christalino Atemona (born 6 May 2002) is a German professional footballer who plays as a centre-back for Slovenian PrvaLiga club Bravo.

== Club career ==
Atemona is a youth product of Reinickendorfer Berlin, before moving to the youth academy of Hertha BSC in 2014. He began his senior career with Hertha BSC II in 2020, and was promoted to train with the senior team in September 2021. On 3 January 2023, he transferred to the Belgian club Kortrijk. He made his professional debut with Kortrijk in a 1–0 Belgian Cup loss to Mechelen on 11 January 2023.

== International career ==
Born in Germany, Atemona is of Angolan descent. He is a youth international for Germany, having played up to the Germany U20s.
