= Nayel Mehssatou =

Chilean footballer (born 2002)

Personal information
- Full name: Nayel Rayan Mehssatou Sepúlveda
- Date of birth: 8 August 2002 (age 24)
- Place of birth: Brussels, Belgium
- Height: 1.72 m (5 ft 8 in)
- Positions: Right-back; midfielder

Team information
- Current team: Kortrijk
- Number: 8

Youth career
- 2008–2009: Toekomst Relegem
- 2009–2022: Anderlecht

Senior career*
Years	Team	Apps	(Gls)
2019–2022	Anderlecht	0	(0)
2022–2025	Kortrijk	101	(5)
2025–2026	Standard Liège	29	(0)
2026–	Kortrijk	2	(0)

International career^{‡}
2017	Morocco U15	1	(0)
2017	Belgium U15	0	(0)
2019	Chile U17	2	(0)
2019	Belgium U18	4	(1)
2022–	Chile	6	(0)
- * Club domestic league appearances and goals as of 15 August 2026 ‡ National team caps and goals as of 21:42, 6 May 2023 (UTC)

Nayel Rayan Mehssatou Sepúlveda (born 8 August 2002) is a professional footballer who plays as a right-back or as a defensive midfielder for Belgian Pro League club Kortrijk. Born in Belgium, he represented Morocco, Belgium, and Chile as a junior internationally, before switching allegiance on the senior level to the Chile national team.

== Career ==
Mehssatou is a youth product of Toekomst Relegem and Anderlecht, having stayed in Anderlecht's youth academy for 13 years. He signed his first professional contract with Anderlecht on 18 December 2019. On 18 January 2022, he moved to Kortrijk, signing a 3.5 year contract. He made his professional debut with Kortrijk in a 3–2 Belgian First Division A loss to Union Saint-Gilloise on 5 March 2022.

On 20 June 2025, Mehssatou joined Standard Liège on a three-year contract. He moved back to KV Kortrijk on 16 July 2026.

== International career ==
Born in Belgium to a Moroccan father and a Chilean mother, Mehssataou was eligible to play for Belgium, Morocco and Chile. Mehssatou first represented Morocco and Belgium at under-15 level in 2017, switching to the Chile under-U17 in October 2019. He then switched back to Belgium, representing the Belgium under-18 that same year, scoring once in 4 appearances.

Mehssatou was called up to the senior Chile national team for friendlies and the 2022 Kirin Cup Soccer tournament in June 2022.
He made his debut for Chile on 6 June 2022, starting in a 2–0 loss to South Korea.

== Personal life ==
Mehssatou was born in Belgium to a Moroccan father and a Chilean mother. His mother, Michelle Sepúlveda, was born in Santiago and moved to Brussels in 1975 along with her Chilean family.
