= Guldensporen Stadion =

Football stadium in Kortrijk, Belgium

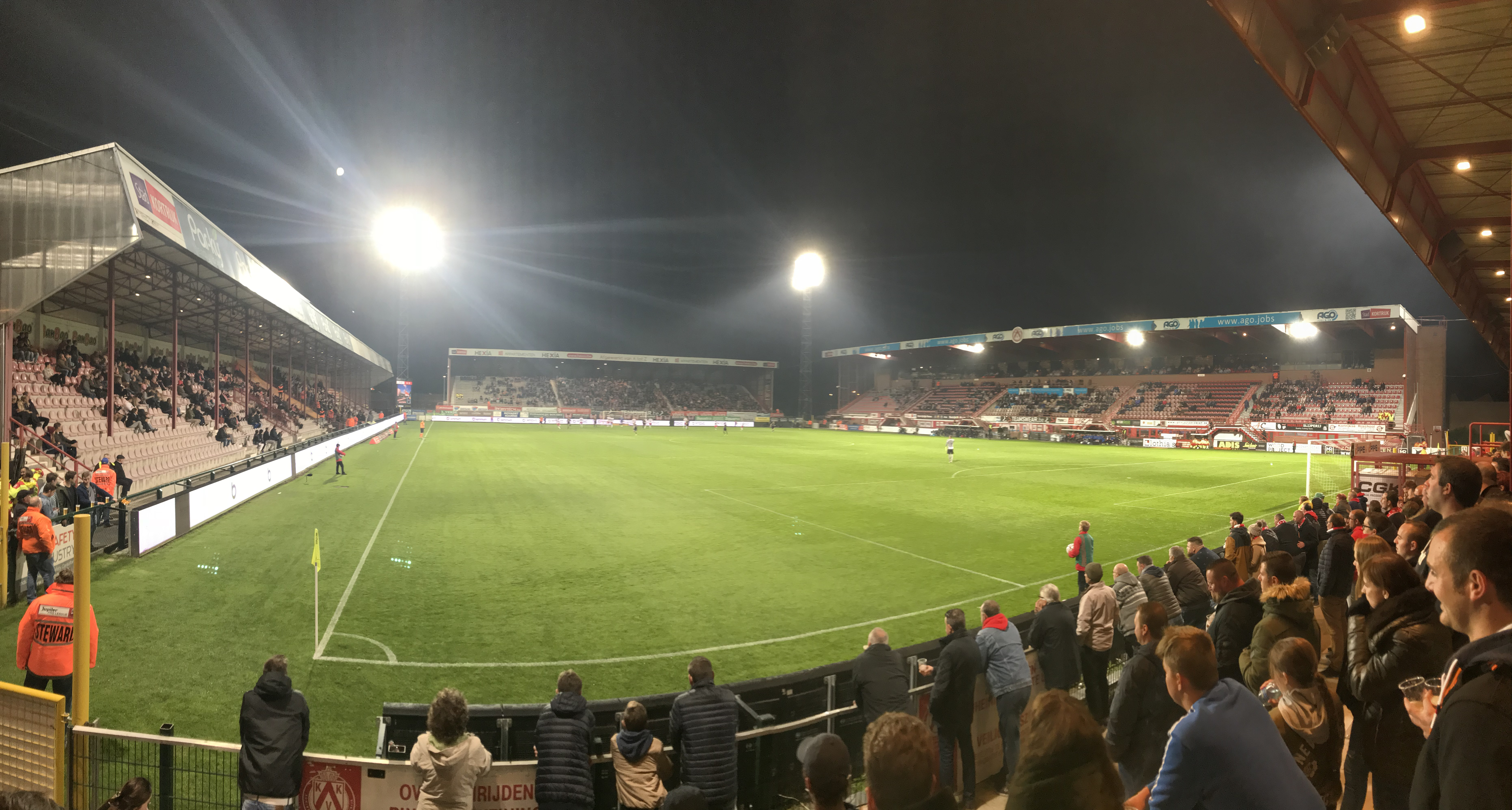
- Guldensporenstadion
- Interactive map of Guldensporen Stadion
- Location: Kortrijk, Belgium
- Coordinates: 50°49′50″N 3°14′56″E
- Capacity: 9,399
- Surface: Grass

Construction
- Groundbreaking: 10 May 1946
- Opened: 17 August 1947
- Renovated: 1988, 2008
- Architect: Maurice Delahousse

Tenant
- K.V. Kortrijk

Guldensporen Stadion (Dutch pronunciation: [ˈɣʏldə(n)spoːrə(n) ˌstaːdijɔn]) is a multi-use stadium in Kortrijk, Belgium. It is currently used mostly for football matches and is the home ground of K.V. Kortrijk. In the summer of 2008, following the promotion of KV Kortrijk to the Belgian First Division, the capacity of the stadium was increased from 6,896 to around 9,399.

The name Guldensporenstadion means "Stadium of the Golden Spurs," a reference to the medieval Battle of the Golden Spurs, fought in Kortrijk in 1302.
