= Felipe Avenatti =

Uruguayan footballer (born 1993)

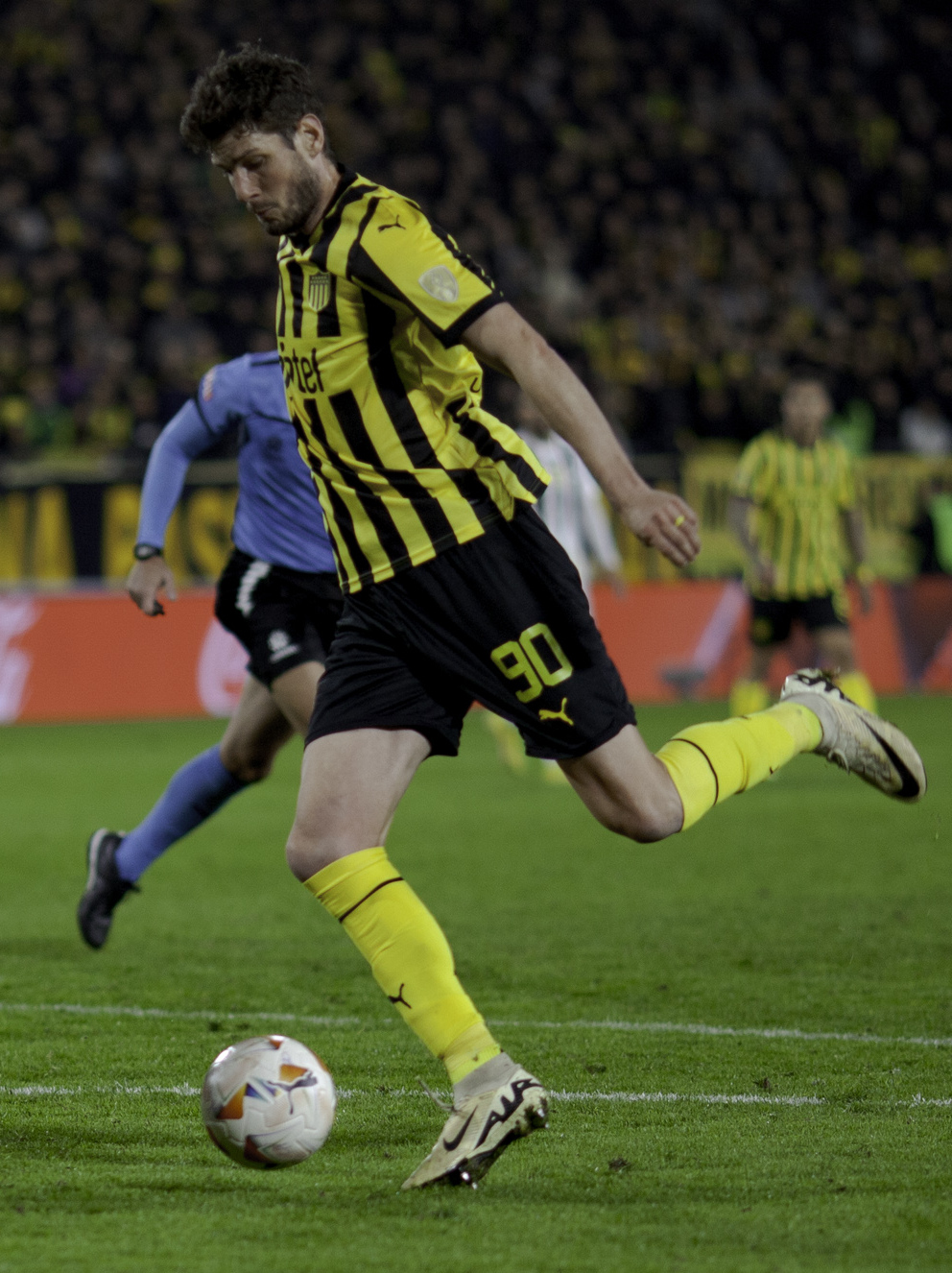
- Avenatti with Peñarol in 2024

Personal information
- Full name: Felipe Nicolás Avenatti Dovillabichus
- Date of birth: 26 April 1993 (age 33)
- Place of birth: Montevideo, Uruguay
- Height: 1.96 m (6 ft 5 in)
- Position: Striker

Team information
- Current team: Boston River
- Number: 20

Youth career
- Unión Vecinal
- River Plate Montevideo

Senior career*
Years	Team	Apps	(Gls)
2012–2013	River Plate Montevideo	34	(12)
2013–2017	Ternana	137	(29)
2017–2018	Luqueño	0	(0)
2017–2018	→ Bologna (loan)	11	(0)
2018–2019	Bologna	0	(0)
2018–2019	→ Kortrijk (loan)	29	(15)
2019–2022	Standard Liège	28	(3)
2021	→ Antwerp (loan)	4	(0)
2021–2022	→ Union SG (loan)	14	(0)
2022	→ Beerschot (loan)	9	(1)
2022–2024	Kortrijk	61	(10)
2024–2025	Peñarol	12	(1)
2025	Boston River	15	(5)
2026	Avaí	12	(1)
2026–	Boston River	1	(0)

International career
2012–2013	Uruguay U20	18	(3)
Medal record
Representing Uruguay
Men's Football
FIFA U-20 World Cup
Runner-up	2013 Turkey
- * Club domestic league appearances and goals as of 18 June 2026

Felipe Nicolás Avenatti Dovillabichus (born 26 April 1993) is a Uruguayan professional footballer who plays as a striker for Boston River.

== Club career ==
=== River Plate ===
Avenatti made his professional debut for River Plate on 19 February 2012, in a 2–3 home defeat against Nacional. He scored his first professional goal on 3 June, against Defensor Sporting. He scored 12 goals in 33 games for the River Plate side.

=== Ternana ===
On 21 August 2013, Avenatti signed a four-year deal with Italian Serie B side Ternana Calcio for €4 million, signing a four-year contract by his manager Paco Casal (which made him the most expensive purchase in the history of Ternana Calcio). He marked his first goal with the rossoverdi in Serie B on the 17 of November 2013 against Pescara. The first season at Ternana he played 25 appearances and 2 goals.

The 2014–2015 season, he scored with a brace at Catanzaro in Italian Cup. In the championship will mark the first day, the network of 2–0 Crotone. After a good start to the season, he scored for Ternana at the umbrian derby on 22 November 2014 against Perugia, after an incredible assist from fellow Uruguayan César Falletti who had dribbled past 5 players plus the goalkeeper, putting the ball near the goal line for Avenatti to score. He concludes the 2014–15 season in Ternana with 12 goals in 39 games in all competitions.

=== Union SG ===
On 2 July 2021, he joined Union SG on loan.

=== Beerschot ===
On 16 January 2022, Avenatti moved on a new loan to Beerschot.

=== Return to Kortrijk ===
On 18 August 2022, Avenatti signed a two-year contract with Kortrijk.

== International career ==
Avenatti is a former Uruguay youth international. He made his Uruguay under-20 team debut on 5 September 2012 in a 2–0 win against Paraguay. He was part of Uruguay squad which finished as runners-up at the 2013 FIFA U-20 World Cup.

== Career statistics ==
As of match played 9 February 2019

Appearances and goals by club, season and competition
Club	Season	League			National Cup		Continental		Other		Total	
Club	Season	Division	Apps	Goals	Apps	Goals	Apps	Goals	Apps	Goals	Apps	Goals
River Plate	2011–12	Primera División	5	1	0	0	—		—		5	1
River Plate	2012–13	Primera División	29	11	0	0	—		—		29	11
River Plate	Total		34	12	0	0	0	0	0	0	34	12
Ternana	2013–14	Serie B	25	2	0	0	—		—		25	2
Ternana	2014–15	Serie B	37	11	2	2	—		—		39	13
Ternana	2015–16	Serie B	35	5	2	1	—		—		37	6
Ternana	2016–17	Serie B	40	12	0	0	—		—		40	12
Ternana	Total		137	30	4	3	0	0	0	0	141	33
Bologna	2017–18	Serie A	11	0	0	0	—		—		11	0
KV Kortrijk (loan)	2018–19	Pro League	24	12	3	0	—		—		27	12
Career total			206	54	7	3	0	0	0	0	213	57

== Honours ==
Uruguay U20

- FIFA U-20 World Cup runner-up: 2013
