= 2020–21 KV Kortrijk season =

K.V. Kortrijk
2020–21 season
- Owner: Vincent Tan
- Chairman: Joseph Allijns
- Manager: Yves Vanderhaeghe
- Stadium: Guldensporen Stadion
- Belgian First Division A: 14th
- Belgian Cup: Seventh round

The 2020–21 K.V. Kortrijk season was the club's 120th season in existence and its 13th consecutive season in the top flight of Belgian football. In addition to the domestic league, Kortrijk participated in this season's edition of the Belgian Cup. The season covered the period from 1 July 2020 to 30 June 2021.

== Players ==
=== First-team squad ===
As of 29 January 2021

Note: Flags indicate national team as defined under FIFA eligibility rules; some limited exceptions apply. Players may hold more than one non-FIFA nationality.

No.	Pos.	Nation	Player
1	GK	SVK	Adam Jakubech (on loan from Lille)
2	DF	SRB	Petar Golubović
4	DF	BEL	Gilles Dewaele
5	DF	AUS	Trent Sainsbury
6	DF	FRA	Lucas Rougeaux
8	MF	CRO	Ante Palaversa (on loan from Manchester City)
9	FW	FRA	Teddy Chevalier
10	FW	COM	Faïz Selemani
11	MF	SRB	Jovan Stojanović
16	GK	BEL	Maxim Deman
17	FW	SEN	Pape Habib Guèye
19	FW	GAM	Muhammed Badamosi
20	MF	MLI	Sambou Sissoko

No.	Pos.	Nation	Player
22	MF	BEL	Gaëtan Hendrickx (on loan from Charleroi)
23	MF	BEL	Julien De Sart
25	DF	UKR	Yevhenii Makarenko (on loan from Anderlecht)
27	MF	BEL	Michiel Jonckheere
30	DF	BEL	Kristof D'haene
31	GK	SRB	Marko Ilić
37	MF	BEL	Brice Verkerken
41	MF	BEL	Yani Van den Bossche
51	FW	GHA	Eric Ocansey
66	DF	SRB	Aleksandar Radovanović
76	DF	BEL	Timothy Derijck (captain)
93	FW	BEL	Zinho Gano (on loan from Genk)
99	FW	MAS	Luqman Hakim

=== Out on loan ===
Note: Flags indicate national team as defined under FIFA eligibility rules; some limited exceptions apply. Players may hold more than one non-FIFA nationality.

No.	Pos.	Nation	Player
3	DF	USA	Brendan Hines-Ike (at D.C. United until 31 December 2021)

== Pre-season and friendlies ==
Win Draw Loss

4 July 2020 Friendly	Standard Liège (Belgium)	3–2	(Belgium) Kortrijk	Angleur, Belgium
16:00 CEST (UTC+2)				Stadium: Académie Robert Louis-Dreyfus

10 July 2020 Friendly	Kortrijk (Belgium)	1–1	(Belgium) Charleroi	Kortrijk, Belgium
15:00 CEST (UTC+2)				Stadium: Guldensporen Stadion

11 July 2020 Friendly	Kortrijk (Belgium)	0–1	(Belgium) Cercle Brugge	Kortrijk, Belgium
15:00 CEST (UTC+2)				Stadium: Guldensporen Stadion

24 July 2020 Friendly	Kortrijk (Belgium)	Cancelled	(Belgium) RWDM Brussels	Kortrijk, Belgium
15:00 CEST (UTC+2)				Stadium: Guldensporen Stadion

25 July 2020 Friendly	Beerschot (Belgium)	Cancelled	(Belgium) Kortrijk	Antwerp, Belgium
18:00 CEST (UTC+2)				Stadium: Olympisch Stadion

31 July 2020 Friendly	Kortrijk (Belgium)	Cancelled	(France) Lille	Kortrijk, Belgium
16:00 CEST (UTC+2)				Stadium: Guldensporen Stadion

1 August 2020 Friendly	Kortrijk (Belgium)	0–1	(Belgium) Deinze	Kortrijk, Belgium
10:30 CEST (UTC+2)				Stadium: Guldensporen Stadion

26 March 2021 Friendly	Anderlecht (Belgium)	1–2	(Belgium) Kortrijk	Anderlecht, Belgium
12:00 CET (UTC+1)	38' (pen.)		Hendrickx 45'; Guèye 60'	Stadium: RSCA Football Academy

== Competitions ==
=== Overview ===
Competition	First match	Last match	Starting round	Final position	Record							
Competition	First match	Last match	Starting round	Final position	Pld	W	D	L	GF	GA	GD	Win %
Belgian First Division A	9 August 2020	18 April 2021	Matchday 1	14th	34	11	6	17	44	57	−13	32.35
Belgian Cup	2 February 2021	9 February 2021	Sixth round	Seventh round	2	1	1	0	4	2	+2	50.00
Total					36	12	7	17	48	59	−11	33.33

Last updated: 18 April 2021
Source: Soccerway

=== Belgian First Division A ===
==== League table ====
Pos	Team	Pld	W	D	L	GF	GA	GD	Pts
12	Eupen	34	10	13	11	44	55	−11	43
13	Charleroi	34	11	9	14	46	49	−3	42
14	Kortrijk	34	11	6	17	44	57	−13	39
15	Sint-Truiden	34	10	8	16	41	52	−11	38
16	Cercle Brugge	34	11	3	20	40	51	−11	36

Source: Jupiler Pro League (in Dutch), Soccerway
Rules for classification: 1) Points; 2) Matches won; 3) Goal difference; 4) Goals scored; 5) Away matches won; 6) Away goal difference; 7) Away goals scored; 8) Play-off.

==== Results summary ====
Overall								Home						Away					
Pld	W	D	L	GF	GA	GD	Pts	W	D	L	GF	GA	GD	W	D	L	GF	GA	GD
34	11	6	17	44	57	−13	39	5	2	10	24	35	−11	6	4	7	20	22	−2

Last updated: 18 April 2021.
Source: Jupiler Pro League

==== Results by round ====
Round	1	2	3	4	5	6	7	8	9	10	11	12	13	14	15	16	17	18	19	20	21	22	23	24	25	26	27	28	29	30	31	32	33	34
Ground	H	A	H	A	H	A	H	A	A	H	A	H	A	H	A	H	H	A	H	H	A	H	H	A	H	A	A	A	H	A	A	H	A	H
Result	L	W	D	W	W	L	L	D	W	L	D	D	L	W	D	L	W	L	W	W	L	L	L	D	L	W	L	W	L	L	L	L	W	L
Position	18	10	9	4	3	6	8	10	8	11	10	9	12	8	9	11	9	10	8	8	11	12	13	14	15	13	13	13	14	14	14	15	14	14

Updated to match(es) played on 18 April 2021. Source: Jupiler Pro League
A = Away; H = Home; W = Win; D = Draw; L = Loss

==== Matches ====
The league fixtures were announced on 8 July 2020.

9 August 2020 1	Kortrijk	1–3	Waasland-Beveren	Kortrijk
20:45 CEST (UTC+2)	Lepoint (yellow card) 45+3'; Mboyo 54' (pen.); Selemani (yellow card) 90+5'	Report	Heymans 10', 90+1', (yellow card) 81'; Vukotić (yellow card) 45+1'; Albanese (yellow card) 51'; Caufriez (yellow card) 52'; Koita 68'	Stadium: Guldensporen Stadion; Attendance: 0 Referee: Kevin van Damme

15 August 2020 2	Gent	1–2	Kortrijk	Ghent
19:00 CEST (UTC+2)	Plastun 59'	Report	Moffi 22'; Makarenko (yellow card) 45+1'; Van der Bruggen 83'	Stadium: Ghelamco Arena; Attendance: 0 Referee: Nicolas Laforge

21 August 2020 3	Kortrijk	0–0	Eupen	Kortrijk
19:00 CEST (UTC+2)	Selemani (yellow card) 72'; Rougeaux (yellow card) 88'	Report	Musona (yellow card) 30'; Cools (yellow card) 90+3'	Stadium: Guldensporen Stadion; Attendance: 0 Referee: Jan Boterberg

29 August 2020 4	Cercle Brugge	0–1	Kortrijk	Bruges
18:30 CEST (UTC+2)	Omolo (yellow card) 39'; Vanhoutte (yellow card) 42'	Report	Makarenko (yellow card) 23'; D'haene (yellow card) 31'; Golubović (yellow card) 51'; Selemani 67'	Stadium: Jan Breydel Stadium; Attendance: 0 Referee: Christof Dierick

13 September 2020 5	Kortrijk	3–0	Excel Mouscron	Kortrijk
20:45 CEST (UTC+2)	Ocansey (yellow card) 50', (goal) 83'; Mboyo (yellow card) 52', (goal) 59'; Dewaele 63'	Report	Onana (red card) 32'; Hočko (yellow card) 67' (yellow-red card) 85'	Stadium: Guldensporen Stadion; Attendance: 3,725; Referee: Kevin Van Damme

20 September 2020 6	Standard Liège	2–1	Kortrijk	Liège
16:00 CEST (UTC+2)	Amallah 31' (pen.); Oularé 35'	Report	Mboyo 36'; D'haene (yellow card) 38'; Jonckheere (yellow card) 84'; Rougeaux (yellow card) 90'	Stadium: Stade Maurice Dufrasne; Attendance: 6,723; Referee: Jan Boterberg

25 September 2020 7	Kortrijk	1–3	Antwerp	Kortrijk
20:45 CEST (UTC+2)	Mboyo 3'; De Sart (yellow card) 69'; D'haene (yellow card) 83'	Report	Sainsbury 63' (o.g.); Refaelov 82'; Mbokani 90+2'	Stadium: Guldensporen Stadion; Attendance: 2,800; Referee: Alexandre Boucaut

3 October 2020 8	Sint-Truiden	0–0	Kortrijk	Sint-Truiden
20:45 CEST (UTC+2)	Lee (yellow card) 44'; Asamoah (yellow card) 80'; Nazon (yellow card) 90+4'	Report	Van der Bruggen (yellow card) 27'; Selemani (red card) 71'; Jakubech (yellow card) 90+2'	Stadium: Stayen; Attendance: 1,550; Referee: Bert Put

17 October 2020 9	KV Mechelen	1–2	Kortrijk	Mechelen
18:30 CEST (UTC+2)	Voet 53'	Report	Jonckheere 71'; Makarenko 74'	Stadium: Achter de Kazerne; Attendance: 5,160; Referee: Lawrence Visser

23 October 2020 10	Kortrijk	1–3	Anderlecht	Kortrijk
20:45 CEST (UTC+2)	Mboyo 87'	Report	Nmecha 6', 65'; Tau 30'	Stadium: Guldensporen Stadion; Attendance: 0 Referee: Jonathan Lardot

2 November 2020 11	Zulte Waregem	1–1	Kortrijk	Waregem
20:45 CET (UTC+1)	Chorý 77', (yellow card) 88'; Opare (yellow card) 90+6'; Dompé (red card) 90+6'	Report	Mboyo 90+7'	Stadium: Regenboogstadion; Attendance: 0 Referee: Wesli De Cremer

7 November 2020 12	Kortrijk	5–5	Beerschot	Kortrijk
16:15 CET (UTC+1)	Jonckheere 1'; Selemani 8'; Mboyo 57' (pen.); Gueye 68'; Sainsbury (yellow card) 84', (goal) 90+4'; De Sart (yellow card) 87'	Report	Vorogovskiy (yellow card) 28'; Bourdin 39', 74'; Sanusi (yellow card) 43'; Holzhauser 49' (pen.); Tissoudali 50'; Frans 88'	Stadium: Guldensporen Stadion; Attendance: 0 Referee: Jasper Vergoote

21 November 2020 13	Club Brugge	1–0	Kortrijk	Bruges
20:45 CET (UTC+1)	Lang 60'	Report	Van der Bruggen (yellow card) 23'; Stojanović (yellow card) 55'; Sainsbury (yellow card) 68'	Stadium: Jan Breydel Stadium; Attendance: 0 Referee: Lothar D'Hondt

29 November 2020 14	Kortrijk	3–1	Oostende	Kortrijk
20:45 CET (UTC+1)	Dewaele 4'; Guèye 49'; Mboyo 80'	Report	McGeehan (yellow card) 17'; Hjulsager 32', (yellow card) 57'; Hendry (yellow card) 77'	Stadium: Guldensporen Stadion; Attendance: 0 Referee: Nathan Verboomen

7 December 2020 15	Charleroi	0–0	Kortrijk	Charleroi
20:45 CET (UTC+1)	Ilaimaharitra (yellow card) 47'; Nicholson (yellow card) 52'; Willems (yellow card) 75'; Gillet (yellow card) 84'	Report	Mboyo (penalty missed) 33', (yellow card) 70'; Sainsbury (yellow card) 34'	Stadium: Stade du Pays de Charleroi; Attendance: 0 Referee: Kevin Van Damme

12 December 2020 16	Kortrijk	0–3	OH Leuven	Kortrijk
18:30 CET (UTC+1)	Golubović (yellow card) 49'; Hines-Ike (yellow card) 82'	Report	Henry 47', 64', 89'; Kotysch (yellow card) 65'	Stadium: Guldensporen Stadion; Attendance: 0 Referee: Wesli De Cremer

16 December 2020 17	Kortrijk	2–1	Standard Liège	Kortrijk
21:00 CET (UTC+1)	Dewaele 2'; Makarenko 39'; Derijck (yellow card) 43'; Ocansey (yellow card) 55'; Lepoint (yellow card) 90+9'	Report	Lestienne 76'; Jans (yellow card) 79'	Stadium: Guldensporen Stadion; Attendance: 0 Referee: Jasper Vergoote

19 December 2020 18	Genk	2–0	Kortrijk	Genk
20:45 CET (UTC+1)	Arteaga 1'; Hrošovský (yellow card) 35'; Bongonda 78'	Report	De Sart (yellow card) 77'; Ocansey (yellow card) 87'	Stadium: Luminus Arena; Attendance: 0 Referee: Alexandre Boucaut

26 December 2020 19	Kortrijk	1–0	Gent	Kortrijk
18:30 CET (UTC+1)	De Sart (yellow card) 31'; Ocansey (yellow card) 34'; Selemani 49'; Lepoint (yellow card) 82'	Report	Yaremchuk (red card) 21'	Stadium: Guldensporen Stadion; Attendance: 0 Referee: Wim Smet

9 January 2021 20	Kortrijk	2–1	Genk	Kortrijk
18:30 CET (UTC+1)	Gueye 23', 54'; Hines-Ike (yellow card) 57'	Report	Onuachu 41'; Kouassi (yellow card) 60'; Ito (yellow card) 73'	Stadium: Guldensporen Stadion; Attendance: 0 Referee: Wesli De Cremer

16 January 2021 21	Oostende	2–1	Kortrijk	Ostend
16:15 CET (UTC+1)				Stadium: Diaz Arena; Attendance: 0

20 January 2021 22	Kortrijk	0–2	Sint-Truiden	Kortrijk
16:30 CET (UTC+1)				Stadium: Guldensporen Stadion; Attendance: 0

23 January 2021 23	Kortrijk	1–2	Cercle Brugge	Kortrijk
18:30 CET (UTC+1)				Stadium: Guldensporen Stadion; Attendance: 0

27 January 2021 24	Beerschot	0–0	Kortrijk	Antwerp
18:45 CET (UTC+1)				Stadium: Olympisch Stadion; Attendance: 0

30 January 2021 25	Kortrijk	1–3	Charleroi	Kortrijk
20:45 CET (UTC+1)	Derijck (red card) 60'; Jonckheere (yellow card) 76'; Guèye 81'	Report	Gholizadeh 22'; Fall 55', 62'; Benchaib (yellow card) 58'	Stadium: Guldensporen Stadion; Attendance: 0 Referee: Wim Smet

5 February 2021 26	Excel Mouscron	0–3	Kortrijk	Mouscron
20:45 CET (UTC+1)				Stadium: Stade Le Canonnier; Attendance: 0

12 February 2021 27	OH Leuven	3–1	Kortrijk	Leuven
20:45 CET (UTC+1)	Henry 10', 20'; Malinov (yellow card) 34' (yellow-red card) 36'; Sowah 40'	Report	Makarenko (yellow card) 38'; Gano 52'; Stojanović (yellow card) 85'; Guèye (yellow card) 87'	Stadium: Den Dreef; Attendance: 0 Referee: Wesley Alen

21 February 2021 28	Anderlecht	0–2	Kortrijk	Anderlecht
13:30 CET (UTC+1)		Report	Sainsbury 45+2'; Palaversa (yellow card) 60'; Gano 74'; Hendrickx (yellow card) 88'; Rougeaux (yellow card) 90'	Stadium: Constant Vanden Stock Stadium; Attendance: 0 Referee: Lawrence Visser

27 February 2021 29	Kortrijk	1–2	Zulte Waregem	Kortrijk
20:45 CET (UTC+1)	Palaversa 20'; Derijck (yellow card) 22'	Report	Bruno 23' (pen.), (yellow card) 62'; Marcq (yellow card) 52'; Chorý 65'; Vossen (yellow card) 67'; De Bock (yellow card) 77'	Stadium: Guldensporen Stadion; Attendance: 0 Referee: Jonathan Lardot

6 March 2021 30	Antwerp	4–2	Kortrijk	Antwerp
20:45 CET (UTC+1)	Seck (red card) 20'; Refaelov 28' (pen.); Lukaku (penalty missed) 54'; Le Marchand 55'; Lamkel Zé 72'; Mbokani (yellow card) 75'; Verstraete 85'	Report	De Sart (yellow card) 27'; Selemani 56'; Gano 67'	Stadium: Bosuilstadion; Attendance: 0 Referee: Christof Dierick

20 March 2021 31	Eupen	2–0	Kortrijk	Eupen
18:30 CET (UTC+1)	Ngoy 52'; Musona (yellow card) 78', (goal) 80'; Heris (yellow card) 90+1'	Report	Makarenko (yellow card) 70'; Radovanović (yellow card) 90+4'	Stadium: Kehrwegstadion; Attendance: 0 Referee: Bram van Driessche

3 April 2021 32	Kortrijk	1–2	Club Brugge	Kortrijk
20:45 CEST (UTC+2)	Gano 18'; Sissoko (yellow card) 45+2'; Ocansey (yellow card) 63'; Selemani (yellow card) 73'; Golubović (yellow card) 90'	Report	Sobol 21'; Vormer (yellow card) 52'; Vanaken 77' (pen.); Pérez (yellow card) 90'	Stadium: Guldensporen Stadion; Attendance: 0 Referee: Jasper Vergoote

11 April 2021 33	Waasland-Beveren	3–4	Kortrijk	Beveren
16:00 CEST (UTC+2)	Frey 17', 44', 90+3' (pen.); Schoonbaert (yellow card) 58'	Report	Gano 3'; Dewaele (yellow card) 40'; De Sart 48'; Selemani 58' (pen.), 90+6'	Stadium: Freethiel Stadion; Attendance: 0 Referee: Erik Lambrechts

18 April 2021 34	Kortrijk	1–4	KV Mechelen	Kortrijk
18:00 CEST (UTC+2)	Selemani 10' (pen.); Jonckheere (yellow card) 74'	Report	Defour (yellow card) 14'; Mrabti 28' (pen.); Storm 35', 46'; Schoofs 82'	Stadium: Guldensporen Stadion; Attendance: 0 Referee: Wim Smet

=== Belgian Cup ===
2 February 2021 Sixth round	Lommel	1–3	Kortrijk	Lommel
18:00 CET (UTC+1)	Henkens (yellow card) 40'; Kis 71' (pen.); Þórðarson (yellow card) 73'	Report	Guèye 14'; Selemani (yellow card) 37', (penalty missed) 75', 90+3'; Stojanović (yellow card) 38'; Dewaele (yellow card) 44'; Chevalier 61'	Stadium: Soevereinstadion; Attendance: 0

9 February 2021 Seventh round	Kortrijk	1–1 (a.e.t.) (5–6 p)	Standard Liège	Kortrijk
20:00 CET (UTC+1)	Selemani 90+2'	Report	Laifis 36'; Tapsoba (yellow card) 82'; Siquet (yellow card) 98'	Stadium: Guldensporen Stadion; Attendance: 0 Referee: Lothar D'hondt
	Penalties
	Chevalier (penalty scored); Makarenko (penalty scored); Stojanović (penalty scored); Derijck (penalty missed); Selemani (penalty scored); Guèye (penalty scored); Sainsbury (penalty missed)		(penalty scored) Bastien; (penalty scored) Klauss; (penalty scored) Dussenne; (penalty missed) Muleka; (penalty scored) Raskin; (penalty scored) Laifis; (penalty scored) Siquet

== Statistics ==
=== Goalscorers ===
As of 15 August 2020

Rank	No.	Pos	Nat	Name	Pro League	Belgian Cup	Total
1	14	MF	(Belgium)	Hannes Van der Bruggen	1	0	1
1	7	FW	(Belgium)	Ilombe Mboyo	1	0	1
1	20	FW	(Nigeria)	Terem Moffi	1	0	1
Totals					3	0	3
