= 2021–22 KV Kortrijk season =

K.V. Kortrijk
2021–22 season
- Owner: Vincent Tan
- Chairman: Ronny Verhelst
- Manager: Karim Belhocine
- Stadium: Guldensporen Stadion
- Belgian First Division A: 13th
- Belgian Cup: Quarter-finals
- Top goalscorer: League: Faïz Selemani (13); All: Faïz Selemani (13)
Home colours	Away colours	Third colours

The 2021–22 season was the 118th season in the existence of K.V. Kortrijk and the club's 10th consecutive season in the top flight of Belgian football. In addition to the domestic league, K.V. Kortrijk participated in this season's edition of the Belgian Cup.

== Players ==
=== First-team squad ===
Note: Flags indicate national team as defined under FIFA eligibility rules; some limited exceptions apply. Players may hold more than one non-FIFA nationality.

No.	Pos.	Nation	Player
2	DF	USA	Bryan Reynolds (on loan from Roma)
4	DF	JPN	Tsuyoshi Watanabe
5	DF	AUS	Trent Sainsbury
6	DF	FRA	Lucas Rougeaux
7	FW	BEL	Dylan Mbayo
8	MF	CRO	Ante Palaversa (on loan from Manchester City)
9	MF	ALG	Billel Messaoudi (on loan from JS Saoura)
10	FW	COM	Faïz Selemani
11	MF	BEL	Amine Benchaib
16	GK	BEL	Maxim Deman
17	FW	SEN	Pape Habib Guèye
18	MF	ALG	Abdelkahar Kadri
19	FW	GAM	Muhammed Badamosi
20	MF	BEL	Alexandre De Bruyn
21	MF	DEN	Victor Torp (on loan from Midtjylland)

No.	Pos.	Nation	Player
22	MF	GEO	Tsotne Bendianishvili
23	FW	MAR	Rachid Alioui (on loan from Angers)
25	DF	CHI	Nayel Mehssatou
26	MF	FRA	Kévin Vandendriessche
27	MF	BEL	Michiel Jonckheere
28	GK	FRA	Joris Delle
29	FW	COL	Marlos Moreno (on loan from Manchester City)
30	DF	BEL	Kristof D'haene (captain)
31	GK	SRB	Marko Ilić
39	FW	GER	Jesaja Herrmann
54	FW	GHA	Jonah Osabutey
66	DF	SRB	Aleksandar Radovanović
77	FW	TOG	David Henen
99	FW	MAS	Luqman Hakim Shamsudin

=== Out on loan ===
Note: Flags indicate national team as defined under FIFA eligibility rules; some limited exceptions apply. Players may hold more than one non-FIFA nationality.

No.	Pos.	Nation	Player
—	FW	GHA	Eric Ocansey (at Waasland-Beveren)

== Pre-season and friendlies ==
Win Draw Loss Fixtures

6 July 2021 Friendly	Kortrijk (Belgium)	0–1	(France) Valenciennes	Kortrijk, Belgium
11:00 CEST (UTC+2)		Report		Stadium: Guldensporenstadion

10 July 2021 Friendly	SC Heerenveen (Netherlands)	2–2	(Belgium) Kortrijk	Jubbega, Netherlands
15:30 CEST (UTC+2)	Halilović 50', 60'	Report	Chevalier 4'; Guèye 79'	Stadium: Sportpark 't Heidefjild

17 July 2021 Friendly	Kortrijk (Belgium)	1–1	(France) Lille	Kortrijk, Belgium
18:30 CEST (UTC+2)	Chevalier 19'	Report	Djaló (red card) 45'; Xeka (red card) 45'; Yazıcı 84' (pen.)	Stadium: Guldensporenstadion

== Competitions ==
=== Overall record ===
Competition	First match	Last match	Starting round	Final position	Record							
Competition	First match	Last match	Starting round	Final position	Pld	W	D	L	GF	GA	GD	Win %
Belgian First Division A	24 July 2021	10 April 2022	Matchday 1	13th	34	9	10	15	43	48	−5	26.47
Belgian Cup	27 October 2021	23 December 2021	Sixth round	Quarter-finals	3	1	1	1	2	4	−2	33.33
Total					37	10	11	16	45	52	−7	27.03

Source: Soccerway

=== Belgian First Division A ===
==== League table ====
Pos	Team	Pld	W	D	L	GF	GA	GD	Pts
11	OH Leuven	34	10	11	13	47	58	−11	41
12	Oostende	34	10	7	17	34	61	−27	37
13	Kortrijk	34	9	10	15	43	48	−5	37
14	Standard Liège	34	9	9	16	32	51	−19	36
15	Eupen	34	8	8	18	37	61	−24	32

Source: Jupiler Pro League (in Dutch), Soccerway
Rules for classification: 1) Points; 2) Matches won; 3) Goal difference; 4) Goals scored; 5) Away matches won; 6) Away goal difference; 7) Away goals scored; 8) Play-off.

==== Results summary ====
Overall								Home						Away					
Pld	W	D	L	GF	GA	GD	Pts	W	D	L	GF	GA	GD	W	D	L	GF	GA	GD
34	9	10	15	43	48	−5	37	5	4	8	23	24	−1	4	6	7	20	24	−4

Source: Jupiler Pro League

==== Results by round ====
Round	1	2	3	4	5	6	7	8	9	10	11	12	13	14	15	16	17	18	19	20	21	22	23	24	25	26	27	28	29	30	31	32	33	34
Ground	H	A	H	A	A	H	A	H	A	H	A	H	A	H	A	A	H	H	A	A	H	A	H	A	H	H	A	H	A	H	A	H	A	H
Result	W	W	L	L	W	D	L	W	D	D	L	W	D	D	D	D	L	W	W	W	L	D	D	D	L	L	L	W	L	L	L	L	L	L
Position	3	1	2	9	5	5	8	6	7	8	10	8	9	9	11	9	10	9	8	7	8	9	8	8	9	10	12	11	11	11	12	12	12	13

Source: Jupiler Pro League
A = Away; H = Home; W = Win; D = Draw; L = Loss

==== Matches ====
The league fixtures were announced on 8 June 2021.

24 July 2021 1	Kortrijk	2–0	RFC Seraing	Kortrijk
18:30 CEST (UTC+2)	Derijck (yellow card) 28'; Chevalier 31'; Vandendriessche (yellow card) 44'; Rougeaux (yellow card) 51'; Selemani 88' (pen.); Palaversa (yellow card) 90+4'	Report	Marius (yellow card) 54'; Nadrani (yellow card) 86'	Stadium: Guldensporen Stadion; Attendance: 2,744; Referee: Christof Dierick

1 August 2021 2	Antwerp	0–1	Kortrijk	Antwerp
21:00 CEST (UTC+2)	L. Verstraete (yellow card) 25'; Soussi (yellow card) 90+2'	Report	Palaversa (yellow card) 13'; D'haene (yellow card) 19'; Rougeaux (yellow card) 32'; Selemani (yellow card) 60', (goal) 87'; Guèye (yellow card) 76'	Stadium: Bosuilstadion; Attendance: 5,000; Referee: Erik Lambrechts

7 August 2021 3	Kortrijk	1–2	Genk	Kortrijk
20:45 CEST (UTC+2)	Chevalier 18'	Report	Onuachu 52'; Muñoz 90+2'	Stadium: Guldensporen Stadion; Attendance: 2,800; Referee: Nicolas Laforge

14 August 2021 4	Union Saint-Gilloise	2–0	Kortrijk	Brussels
16:15 CEST (UTC+2)	Vanzeir 9'; Lynen 52'	Report	Palaversa (yellow card) 10'; Derijck (yellow card) 15'; Sainsbury (yellow card) 39'; Rougeaux (yellow card) 43'; Chevalier (yellow card) 54'; Fixelles (red card) 64'; Moreno (yellow card) 83'	Stadium: Stade Joseph Marien; Attendance: 4,500; Referee: Wesli De Cremer

21 August 2021 5	Sint-Truiden	0–2	Kortrijk	Sint-Truiden
20:45 CEST (UTC+2)		Report	Selemani 1'; Guèye 90+3'	Stadium: Stayen; Attendance: 2,243; Referee: Kevin Van Damme

27 August 2021 6	Kortrijk	2–2	Mechelen	Kortrijk
20:45 CEST (UTC+2)		Report		Stadium: Guldensporen Stadion; Attendance: 3,493; Referee: Alexandre Boucaut

12 September 2021 7	OH Leuven	2–1	Kortrijk	Leuven
21:00 CEST (UTC+2)	De Sart 50'; Schrijvers 78'	Report	Selemani 62'; Radovanović (red card) 90+2'	Stadium: Den Dreef; Attendance: 3,200; Referee: Wim Smet

19 September 2021 8	Kortrijk	1–0	Gent	Kortrijk
21:00 CEST (UTC+2)	Selemani 9' (pen.)	Report		Stadium: Guldensporen Stadion; Attendance: 5,053; Referee: Jasper Vergoote

25 September 2021 9	Zulte Waregem	2–2	Kortrijk	Waregem
18:30 CEST (UTC+2)	Pletinckx 84'; Vossen 88' (pen.)	Report	Guèye 57'; Ocansey 71'	Stadium: Regenboogstadion; Attendance: 8,231; Referee: Jan Boterberg

2 October 2021 10	Kortrijk	2–2	Charleroi	Kortrijk
16:15 CEST (UTC+2)	Selemani 45' (pen.); Alioui 73'	Report	Nicholson 64'; Gholizadeh 90+5'	Stadium: Guldensporen Stadion; Attendance: 4,494; Referee: Bram Van Driessche

15 October 2021 11	Club Brugge	2–0	Kortrijk	Bruges
CEST (UTC+2)		Report		Stadium: Jan Breydel Stadium; Attendance: 26,352; Referee: Bert Put

23 October 2021 12	Kortrijk	1–0	Oostende	Kortrijk
CEST (UTC+2)		Report		Stadium: Guldensporen Stadion; Attendance: 3,357; Referee: Jonathan Lardot

30 October 2021 13	Standard Liège	1–1	Kortrijk	Liège
18:30 CEST (UTC+2)	Bokadi 82'	Report	Moreno 52'	Stadium: Stade Maurice Dufrasne; Attendance: 16,852; Referee: Erik Lambrechts

6 November 2021 14	Kortrijk	1–1	Beerschot	Kortrijk
CET (UTC+1)		Report		Stadium: Guldensporen Stadion; Attendance: 5,803; Referee: Arthur Denil

21 November 2021 15	Anderlecht	1–1	Kortrijk	Anderlecht
13:30 CET (UTC+1)		Report		Stadium: Constant Vanden Stock Stadium; Attendance: 18,000; Referee: Wim Smet

27 November 2021 16	Eupen	2–2	Kortrijk	Eupen
CET (UTC+1)		Report		Stadium: Kehrwegstadion; Attendance: 1,650; Referee: Jan Boterberg

4 December 2021 17	Kortrijk	0–2	Cercle Brugge	Kortrijk
18:30 CET (UTC+1)		Report	Matondo 28', 74'	Stadium: Guldensporen Stadion; Attendance: 4,311; Referee: Bert Put

11 December 2021 18	Kortrijk	2–1	OH Leuven	Kortrijk
16:15 CET (UTC+1)	Sekidika (red card) 3'; Sainsbury 63'; Selemani 89'	Report	Sekidika (red card) 39'; Sekidika 72'	Stadium: Guldensporen Stadion; Attendance: 4,321; Referee: Jasper Vergoote

14 December 2021 19	Oostende	0–2	Kortrijk	Ostend
21:00 CET (UTC+1)		Report	D'haene 45'; Vandendriessche 63'	Stadium: Versluys Arena; Attendance: 1,756; Referee: Lothar D'hondt

17 December 2021 20	Seraing	0–2	Kortrijk	Seraing
20:45 CET (UTC+1)		Report	Palaversa 54'; Selemani 59' (pen.)	Stadium: Stade du Pairay; Attendance: 1,400; Referee: Wim Smet

14 January 2022 22	Gent	2–2	Kortrijk	Ghent
20:45 CET (UTC+1)	Castro-Montes 44'; Mboyo 52'	Report	Mbayo 8', 90+1'	Stadium: Ghelamco Arena; Attendance: 0 Referee: Wim Smet

22 January 2022 23	Kortrijk	1–1	Eupen	Kortrijk
16:15 CET (UTC+1)	Messaoudi 52'	Report	Ngoy 23'	Stadium: Guldensporen Stadion; Attendance: 0 Referee: Lawrence Visser

25 January 2022 24	Charleroi	1–1	Kortrijk	Charleroi
21:00 CET (UTC+1)	Bayo 21'	Report	Rougeaux 14'	Stadium: Stade du Pays de Charleroi; Attendance: 0 Referee: Lothar D'hondt

30 January 2022 25	Kortrijk	0–1	Club Brugge	Kortrijk
21:00 CET (UTC+1)		Report	Dost 54'	Stadium: Guldensporen Stadion; Attendance: 6,214; Referee: Alexandre Boucaut

2 February 2022 21	Kortrijk	0–2	Antwerp	Kortrijk
18:45 CET (UTC+1)	Torp (yellow card) 57'; Kadri (red card) 68'; D'haene (yellow card) 70'	Report	B. Verstraete (red card) 10'; Samatta 18'; Dessoleil (yellow card) 59'; Gerkens 90+1'	Stadium: Guldensporen Stadion; Attendance: 4,411; Referee: Jasper Vergoote

5 February 2022 26	Kortrijk	1–3	Sint-Truiden	Kortrijk
16:15 CET (UTC+1)	Kadri 61'	Report	Koita 11'; Brüls 39' (pen.); Hayashi 86'	Stadium: Guldensporen Stadion; Attendance: 4,176; Referee: Erik Lambrechts

13 February 2022 27	Beerschot	2–1	Kortrijk	Antwerp
21:00 CET (UTC+1)	Avenatti 30'; Sebaoui 42'	Report	Moreno 10'	Stadium: Olympic Stadium; Attendance: 3,200; Referee: Wesli De Cremer

19 February 2022 28	Kortrijk	5–0	Zulte Waregem	Kortrijk
18:30 CET (UTC+1)	Sainsbury 17', 44'; Selemani 53' (pen.), 64'; Badamosi 61'	Report	Humphreys (yellow card) 6' (yellow-red card) 36'	Stadium: Guldensporen Stadion; Attendance: 6,226; Referee: Lawrence Visser

27 February 2022 29	Genk	2–0	Kortrijk	Genk
16:00 CET (UTC+1)	Onuachu 16'; Paintsil 22'	Report		Stadium: Luminus Arena; Attendance: 13,834; Referee: Lothar D'hondt

5 March 2022 30	Kortrijk	2–3	Union Saint-Gilloise	Kortrijk
18:30 CET (UTC+1)	Selemani 8', 76'	Report	Nielsen 13'; Kandouss 67'; Undav 87'	Stadium: Guldensporen Stadion; Attendance: 6,682; Referee: Jan Boterberg

12 March 2022 31	Cercle Brugge	2–0	Kortrijk	Bruges
18:30 CET (UTC+1)	Hotić 50' (pen.); Denkey 66'	Report		Stadium: Jan Breydel Stadium; Attendance: 4,000; Referee: Nathan Verboomen

20 March 2022 32	Kortrijk	0–1	Standard Liège	Kortrijk
16:00 CET (UTC+1)		Report	Amallah 77'	Stadium: Guldensporen Stadion; Attendance: 6,576; Referee: Kevin Van Damme

2 April 2022 33	Mechelen	3–2	Kortrijk	Mechelen
18:30 CEST (UTC+2)	Walsh 15'; Cuypers 53'; Hairemans 56'	Report	Benchaib 7', 47'	Stadium: Achter de Kazerne; Attendance: 9,679; Referee: Christof Dierick

10 April 2022 34	Kortrijk	2–3	Anderlecht	Bruges
18:30 CEST (UTC+2)	Sainsbury 20' (pen.); Reynolds 67'	Report	Zirkzee 25'; Ait El Hadj 52'; Kouamé 57'	Stadium: Jan Breydel Stadium; Attendance: 8,950; Referee: Jan Boterberg

=== Belgian Cup ===
27 October 2021 Sixth round	Knokke	1–1 (a.e.t.) (1–2 p)	Kortrijk	Knokke
20:00 CEST (UTC+2)	Lambo 79'		Kadri 51'	Stadium: Burgemeester Graaf Leopold Lippens Park
	Penalties
	Mariën (penalty missed); Binst (penalty missed); Van den Bossche (penalty missed); Vanraefelghem (penalty scored); Bailly (penalty missed)		(penalty missed) D'haene; (penalty missed) Rougeaux; (penalty scored) Palaversa; (penalty scored) Sainsbury

1 December 2021 Seventh round	Kortrijk	1–0	Oostende	Kortrijk
20:30 CET (UTC+1)	Guèye 53'			Stadium: Guldensporen Stadion

23 December 2021 Quarter-finals	Anderlecht	3–0	Kortrijk	Anderlecht
18:45 CET (UTC+1)	Kouamé 35', 76'; Gómez 43'	Report		Stadium: Constant Vanden Stock Stadium; Referee: Erik Lambrechts
