= List of Belgian football transfers winter 2020–21 =

This is a list of Belgian football transfers for the 2020–21 winter transfer window. Only transfers involving a team from the professional divisions are listed, including the 16 teams in the 2020–21 Belgian First Division A and the 8 teams playing in the 2020–21 Belgian First Division B.

The winter transfer window opens on 1 January 2021, although a few transfers may take place before that date. The window closes at midnight on 31 January 2021 although outgoing transfers might still happen to leagues in which the window is still open. Players without a club may join teams, either during or in between transfer windows.

== Transfers ==
| Date | Name | Moving from | Moving to | Fee | Note |
|---|---|---|---|---|---|
| 4 July 2020 | Victor Wernersson | Göteborg | KV Mechelen | Free | |
| 18 December 2020 | Sébastien Bruzzese | KV Kortrijk | Cercle Brugge | Free | |
| 24 December 2020 | Bas Dost | Eintracht Frankfurt | Club Brugge | Undisclosed | |
| 24 December 2020 | Nils Schouterden | Eupen | AEK Larnaca | Undisclosed | |
| 28 December 2020 | Ángelo Preciado | Independiente DV | Genk | Undisclosed | |
| 29 December 2020 | Warner Hahn | Heerenveen | Anderlecht | Free | |
| 31 December 2020 | Christian Brüls | Westerlo | Sint-Truiden | Undisclosed | |
| 4 January 2021 | Michael Krmenčík | Club Brugge | PAOK | Loan | |
| 4 January 2021 | Joakim Mæhle | Genk | Atalanta | Undisclosed | |
| 5 January 2021 | Isaac Kiese Thelin | Anderlecht | Kasımpaşa | Loan | |
| 5 January 2021 | Andy King | Leicester City | OH Leuven | Free | |
| 5 January 2021 | Eric Smith | Gent | FC St. Pauli | Loan | |
| 7 January 2021 | Teddy Chevalier | Valenciennes | KV Kortrijk | Undisclosed | |
| 7 January 2021 | Stefano Denswil | Bologna | Club Brugge | Loan | |
| 7 January 2021 | Sébastien Dewaest | Genk | Toulouse | Loan | |
| 7 January 2021 | Mark McKenzie | Philadelphia Union | Genk | Undisclosed | |
| 8 January 2021 | Anders Kristiansen | Union SG | Sarpsborg 08 | Undisclosed | |
| 8 January 2021 | Ilombe Mboyo | KV Kortrijk | Sint-Truiden | Undisclosed | |
| 9 January 2021 | Antonio Milić | Anderlecht | (Poland) Lech Poznań | Undisclosed | |
| 10 January 2021 | Kévin Denkey | Nîmes | Cercle Brugge | Undisclosed | |
| 11 January 2021 | George Broadbent | Sheffield United | Beerschot | Loan | |
| 11 January 2021 | Jordy Gillekens | OH Leuven | Lierse Kempenzonen | Loan | |
| 11 January 2021 | Peter Žulj | Anderlecht | (Turkey) Göztepe | Loan | |
| 12 January 2021 | Filip Benković | Leicester City | OH Leuven | Loan | |
| 13 January 2021 | Majeed Ashimeru | Red Bull Salzburg | Anderlecht | Loan | |
| 13 January 2021 | Santiago Colombatto | Sint-Truiden | León | Loan | |
| 13 January 2021 | Ferdy Druijf | AZ | KV Mechelen | Loan | |
| 13 January 2021 | Klauss | 1899 Hoffenheim | Standard Liège | Loan | |
| 13 January 2021 | Johanna Omolo | Cercle Brugge | BB Erzurumspor | Undisclosed | |
| 14 January 2021 | Hamdi Harbaoui | Al-Arabi | Royal Excel Mouscron | Undisclosed | |
| 15 January 2021 | Yonas Malede | Maccabi Netanya | Gent | Undisclosed | |
| 15 January 2021 | Ivo Rodrigues | Royal Antwerp | Famalicão | Undisclosed | |
| 15 January 2021 | Siebe Schrijvers | Club Brugge | OH Leuven | Undisclosed | |
| 17 January 2021 | Christophe Lepoint | Kortrijk | Mouscron | Undisclosed | |
| 18 January 2021 | Abdoulay Diaby | Sporting CP | Anderlecht | Loan | |
| 18 January 2021 | Dimitri Lavalée | Mainz 05 | Sint-Truiden | Loan | |
| 18 January 2021 | Naomichi Ueda | Cercle Brugge | Nîmes | Loan | |
| 19 January 2021 | Hannes Van der Bruggen | Kortrijk | Cercle Brugge | Undisclosed | |
| 20 January 2021 | Mitja Križan | Lommel | NK Bravo | Loan | |
| 20 January 2021 | Lucas Pirard | Waasland-Beveren | Union SG | Loan | |
| 20 January 2021 | Koki Saito | Yokohama | Lommel | Undisclosed | |
| 20 January 2021 | Rubin Seigers | Genk | Westerlo | Undisclosed | |
| 21 January 2021 | Antoine Colassin | Anderlecht | Zulte Waregem | Loan | |
| 21 January 2021 | Krépin Diatta | Club Brugge | Monaco | Undisclosed | |
| 21 January 2021 | Strahinja Pavlović | Monaco | Cercle Brugge | Loan | |
| 22 January 2021 | Stélvio | RWDM Brussels | Jeunesse Esch | Undisclosed | |
| 23 January 2021 | Jordan Botaka | Gent | Charleroi | Loan | |
| 23 January 2021 | Jacob Bruun Larsen | 1899 Hoffenheim | Anderlecht | Loan | |
| 25 January 2021 | Emmanuel Dennis | Club Brugge | 1. FC Köln | Loan | |
| 25 January 2021 | Mats Møller Dæhli | Genk | 1. FC Nürnberg | Loan | |
| 25 January 2021 | Bubacarr Sanneh | Anderlecht | AGF | Loan | |
| 25 January 2021 | Ognjen Vranješ | Anderlecht | Charleroi | Loan | |
| 26 January 2021 | Manuel Benson | Royal Antwerp | PEC Zwolle | Loan | |
| 26 January 2021 | Mustapha Bundu | Anderlecht | Copenhagen | Loan | |
| 26 January 2021 | Rocky Bushiri | Norwich City | Eupen | Loan | |
| 26 January 2021 | Zinho Gano | Genk | Kortrijk | Loan | |
| 26 January 2021 | Ante Palaversa | Manchester City | Kortrijk | Loan | |
| 28 January 2021 | Luka Adžić | Anderlecht | Emmen | Loan | |
| 28 January 2021 | Felipe Avenatti | Standard Liège | Royal Antwerp | Loan | |
| 28 January 2021 | Aleksandar Radovanović | Lens | Kortrijk | Undisclosed | |
| 29 January 2021 | Aleksandar Boljević | Standard Liège | Eupen | Loan | |
| 29 January 2021 | Carlos Embaló | Eupen | Alcorcón | Loan | |
| 29 January 2021 | Prince Ibara | Beerschot | Châteauroux | Loan | |
| 29 January 2021 | Dario Van den Buijs | Beerschot | Fortuna Sittard | Loan | |
| 30 January 2021 | Tahith Chong | Manchester United | Club Brugge | Loan | |
| 30 January 2021 | Nabil Dirar | Fenerbahçe | Club Brugge | Loan | |
| 30 January 2021 | Alexis Gamboa | Waasland-Beveren | Alajuelense | Loan | |
| 30 January 2021 | Daiki Hashioka | Urawa Red | Sint-Tuiden | Loan | |
| 30 January 2021 | Tim Kleindienst | Gent | 1. FC Heidenheim | Loan | |
| 30 January 2021 | Sivert Heltne Nilsen | Elfsborg | Waasland-Beveren | Undisclosed | |
| 31 January 2021 | Shawn Adewoye | Genk | RKC Waalwijk | Undisclosed | |
| 31 January 2021 | Jeremy Cijntje | Heracles Almelo | Waasland-Beveren | Loan | |
| 31 January 2021 | Virgiliu Postolachi | Mouscron | Vendsyssel | Loan | |
| 1 February 2021 | Yunus Bahadir | Genk | Charleroi | Undisclosed | |
| 1 February 2021 | Zakaria Bakkali | Anderlecht | Beerschot | Loan | |
| 1 February 2021 | Cristian Benavente | Pyramids | Charleroi | Loan | |
| 1 February 2021 | Lucas Ribeiro Costa | Charleroi | RWD Molenbeek | Loan | |
| 1 February 2021 | Ortwin De Wolf | Eupen | Royal Antwerp | Loan | |
| 1 February 2021 | Simon Deli | Club Brugge | Slavia Prague | Loan | |
| 1 February 2021 | Landry Dimata | Anderlecht | Espanyol | Loan | |
| 1 February 2021 | Pol García | Sint-Truiden | (Mexico) Juárez | Undisclosed | |
| 1 February 2021 | Gaëtan Hendrickx | Charleroi | Kortrijk | Loan | |
| 1 February 2021 | Robin Himmelmann | FC St. Pauli | Eupen | Free | |
| 1 February 2021 | Cédric Kipré | (England) West Bromwich Albion | Charleroi | Loan | |
| 1 February 2021 | Maxime Le Marchand | (England) Fulham | Royal Antwerp | Loan | |
| 1 February 2021 | Junior Pius | Royal Antwerp | Sint-Truiden | Loan | |
| 1 February 2021 | Stipe Radić | Hajduk Split | Beerschot | Undisclosed | |
| 1 February 2021 | Lee Seung-woo | Sint-Truiden | (Portugal) Portimonense | Loan | |
| 1 February 2021 | Elias Sierra | Genk | Heracles Almelo | Undisclosed | |
| 1 February 2021 | Tarik Tissoudali | Beerschot | Gent | Undisclosed | |
| 1 February 2021 | William Togui | KV Mechelen | ES Tunis | Loan | |
| 1 February 2021 | Matthias Verreth | Waasland-Beveren | Kolding IF | Loan | |
| 1 February 2021 | Louis Verstraete | Royal Antwerp | Waasland-Beveren | Loan | |
| 1 February 2021 | Michel Vlap | Anderlecht | Arminia Bielefeld | Loan | |
| 1 February 2021 | Anass Zaroury | Lommel | Charleroi | Undisclosed | |
| 1 February 2021 | Anass Zaroury | Charleroi | Lommel | Loan | |
| 3 February 2021 | Samy Mmaee | Sint-Truiden | Ferencváros | Unidsclosed | |
| 5 February 2021 | Jonathan Bolingi | Royal Antwerp | Lausanne-Sport | Loan | |
| 12 February 2021 | Luan Peres | Club Brugge | Santos | Undisclosed | |
| 17 February 2021 | Guy Mbenza | Royal Antwerp | Stade Lausanne Ouchy | Loan | |
| 25 February 2021 | Menno Koch | Eupen | CSKA Sofia | Unidsclosed | |
| 8 March 2021 | Brendan Hines-Ike | KV Kortrijk | D.C. United | Loan | |
