= Tsotne Bendianishvili =

Georgian footballer

Personal information
- Date of birth: 27 December 2002 (age 23)
- Place of birth: Kortrijk, Belgium
- Height: 1.82 m (6 ft 0 in)
- Position: Midfielder

Team information
- Current team: Harelbeke

Youth career
- Kortrijk

Senior career*
Years	Team	Apps	(Gls)
2021–2022	Kortrijk	1	(0)
2022–2024	Winkel Sport	21	(0)
2024–	Harelbeke		

International career^{‡}
2019–	Georgia U17	1	(0)
2020–	Georgia U18	11	(1)
- * Club domestic league appearances and goals as of 16 August 2023 ‡ National team caps and goals as of 10 February 2022

Tsotne Bendianishvili (Georgian: ცოტნე ბენდიანიშვილი; born 27 December 2002) is a Georgian/Belgian professional footballer who plays for Belgian club Harelbeke.

== Club career ==
Having already made a few bench appearances and signed his first contract for Kortrijk during the 2021–22 season, Tsotne Bendianishvili made his professional debut for the club on the 2 February 2022, replacing Michiel Jonckheere in the extra-time of a 2–0 home D1A loss to Antwerp.
