= Terem Moffi =

Nigerian footballer (born 1999)

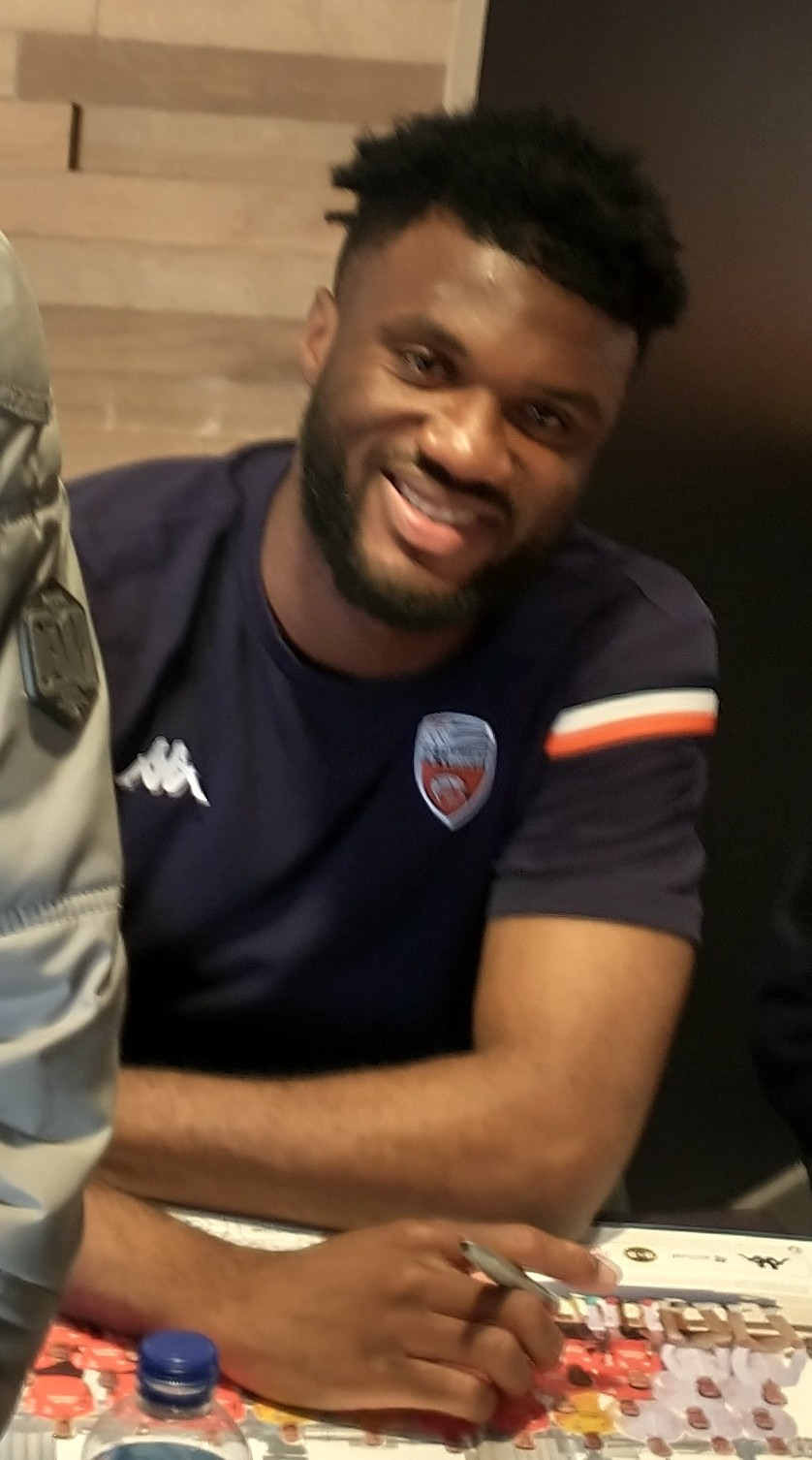
- Moffi with Lorient in 2022

Personal information
- Full name: Terem Igobor Moffi
- Date of birth: 25 May 1999 (age 27)
- Place of birth: Calabar, Nigeria
- Height: 1.88 m (6 ft 2 in)
- Position: Forward

Team information
- Current team: Hamburger SV
- Number: 9

Youth career
- 2016–2017: Buckswood FA

Senior career*
Years	Team	Apps	(Gls)
2017	Kauno Žalgiris	16	(1)
2019–2020	Riteriai	29	(20)
2020	Kortrijk	9	(5)
2020–2023	Lorient	87	(34)
2023	→ Nice (loan)	16	(6)
2023–2026	Nice	45	(14)
2026	→ Porto (loan)	9	(1)
2026–	Hamburger SV	8	(2)

International career^{‡}
2021–	Nigeria	23	(6)
Medal record
Men's football
Representing Nigeria
Africa Cup of Nations
Runner-up	2023 Ivory Coast
- * Club domestic league appearances and goals as of 1 November 2026 ‡ National team caps and goals as of 00:53, 10 June 2026 (UTC)

Terem Igobor Moffi MON (born 25 May 1999) is a Nigerian professional footballer who plays as a forward for Bundesliga club Hamburger SV and the Nigeria national team.

== Club career ==
=== Kortrijk ===
Moffi left Nigeria and moved to England to join the Buckswood Football Academy at Hastings, East Sussex at the age of 17, and thereafter moved to Lithuania with Kauno Žalgiris. He eventually joined Riteriai, but had visa issues that delayed his debut. Moffi eventually scored 20 goals in 29 leagues games for Riteriai, and transferred to Belgian club Kortrijk in January 2020.

=== Lorient ===
On 1 October 2020, Moffi joined Ligue 1 side Lorient on a permanent deal.

=== Nice ===
On 31 January 2023, he signed for Nice on loan until the end of the season, with an obligation-to-buy for €30 million and a 15% sell-on clause in favor of Lorient. In the 2023–24 season, he became his club's top scorer with 11 goals.

On 30 November 2025, after a run of six consecutive defeats, Moffi and several other Nice players were attacked by supporters as they got off the team bus following their 3–1 loss away to his former side Lorient. As a result, Moffi was placed on sick leave for one week.

==== Porto (loan) ====
On 30 January 2026, Moffi joined Portuguese Primeira Liga club Porto on loan until the end of the 2025–26 season, with an optional buy-clause of €8 million.

== International career ==
On 14 May 2021, Nigeria head coach Gernot Rohr included Moffi in his 31-man list for friendlies in June. Moffi debuted with the Super Eagles in a 1–0 loss to Cameroon on 4 June 2021.

Moffi scored his first two goals for Nigeria on June 13, 2022, against São Tomé and Príncipe. With his brace, he contributed to his team's 10–0 victory.

Initially left out of the list of twenty-five Nigerian players selected by José Peseiro to take part in the 2023 Africa Cup of Nations, Terem Moffi was later called up to replace the injured Victor Boniface.

== Personal life ==
Moffi's father, Leo, was a professional footballer in Nigeria and played as a goalkeeper. Moffi's mother is Margaret, who is blessed with four children, with Moffi being the third. Moffi lives a quiet life and keeps his social life private.

== Career statistics ==
=== Club ===
As of match played 1 November 2026

Appearances and goals by club, season and competition
Club	Season	League			National cup (Note: Includes Belgian Cup, Coupe de France, Taça de Portugal)		Europe		Total	
Club	Season	Division	Apps	Goals	Apps	Goals	Apps	Goals	Apps	Goals
Kauno Žalgiris	2017	A Lyga	8	1	0	0	—		8	1
Riteriai	2019	A Lyga	29	20	0	0	2 (Note: Appearances in UEFA Europa League)	0	31	20
Kortrijk	2019–20	Belgian Pro League	7	4	2	0	—		9	4
Kortrijk	2020–21	Belgian Pro League	2	1	0	0	—		2	1
Kortrijk	Total		9	5	2	0	—		11	5
Lorient	2020–21	Ligue 1	32	14	2	1	—		34	15
Lorient	2021–22	Ligue 1	37	8	1	0	—		38	8
Lorient	2022–23	Ligue 1	18	12	0	0	—		18	12
Lorient	Total		87	34	3	1	—		90	35
Nice (loan)	2022–23	Ligue 1	16	6	0	0	4 (Note: Appearances in UEFA Europa Conference League)	3	20	9
Nice	2023–24	Ligue 1	30	11	2	0	—		32	11
Nice	2024–25	Ligue 1	5	1	0	0	—		5	1
Nice	2025–26	Ligue 1	10	2	0	0	5 (Note: Two appearances in UEFA Champions League, three appearances and one goal in UEFA Europa League)	1	15	3
Nice	Nice total		61	20	2	0	9	4	72	24
Porto (loan)	2025–26	Primeira Liga	9	1	2	0	4	1	15	2
Hamburger SV	2026–27	Bundesliga	8	2	1	1	—		9	3
Career total			211	83	10	2	15	5	236	90

=== International ===
As of match played 10 June 2026

Appearances and goals by national team and year
National team	Year	Apps	Goals
Nigeria	2021	3	0
Nigeria	2022	6	3
Nigeria	2023	5	1
Nigeria	2024	4	0
Nigeria	2025	1	0
Nigeria	2026	4	2
Total		23	6

Scores and results list Nigeria's goal tally first.

List of international goals scored by Terem Moffi
No.	Date	Venue	Opponent	Score	Result	Competition
1	13 June 2022	Stade Adrar, Agadir, Morocco	São Tomé and Príncipe	3–0	10–0	2023 Africa Cup of Nations qualification
2	13 June 2022	Stade Adrar, Agadir, Morocco	São Tomé and Príncipe	6–0	10–0	2023 Africa Cup of Nations qualification
3	27 September 2022	Miloud Hadefi Stadium, Bir El Djir, Algeria	Algeria	1–0	1–2	Friendly
4	16 October 2023	Estádio Municipal de Portimão, Portimão, Portugal	Mozambique	1–1	3–2	Friendly
5	30 May 2026	The Valley, London, England	Jamaica	2–0	3–0	2026 Unity Cup
6	3 June 2026	Stadion Narodowy, Warsaw, Poland	Poland	1–0	2–2	Friendly

== Honours ==
Porto

- Primeira Liga: 2025–26

Nigeria

- Africa Cup of Nations runner-up: 2023

Individual

- UEFA Europa Conference League Goal of the Season: 2022–23

Orders

- Member of the Order of the Niger
