= Pape Habib Guèye =

Senegalese footballer

Personal information
- Date of birth: 20 September 1999 (age 27)
- Place of birth: Ziguinchor, Senegal
- Height: 1.88 m (6 ft 2 in)
- Position: Forward

Team information
- Current team: Esenler Erokspor (on loan from Kasımpaşa)
- Number: 99

Youth career
- Académie Darou Salam

Senior career*
Years	Team	Apps	(Gls)
2018–2020	Aalesund	57	(25)
2020–2023	KV Kortrijk	78	(14)
2023–2025	Aberdeen	24	(6)
2024	→ Kristiansund (loan)	15	(4)
2025–	Kasımpaşa	26	(5)
2026–	→ Esenler Erokspor (loan)	2	(0)

International career
2017	Senegal U20	8	(0)
- * Club domestic league appearances and goals as of 15 October 2026

Pape Habib Guèye (born 20 September 1999) is a Senegalese professional footballer who plays as a forward for Turkish TFF 1. Lig club Esenler Erokspor on loan from Kasımpaşa.

== Career ==
=== Early career ===
Playing his youth career with Académie Darou Salam, he was a squad member for the 2017 Africa U-20 Cup of Nations, where Senegal finished as runners-up.

He joined Norwegian second-tier side Aalesund ahead of the 2018 season. He scored 22 goals for Aalesund in two seasons, but also had disciplinary issues.

In January 2020, during the winter transfer window, he was bought by K.V. Kortrijk of the top-tier Belgian First Division A.

==== Aberdeen ====
On 29 August 2023, Guèye affectionately known to the Dons fans as Mpape signed for Scottish Premiership club Aberdeen for an undisclosed fee on a three-year contract.

On February 19, 2024, Guèye joined Norwegian side Kristiansund BK on loan, with Aberdeen manager Neil Warnock stating "Pape needs to get out and play some regular football".

On 19 July 2024 It was announced that Guèye had returned to Aberdeen. Guèye scored five goals in the first five matches of the 2024–25 Scottish Premiership season. On 2 October, it was reported that Guèye was ruled out until January 2025 with a quad muscle tear he picked up in training. On 24 May 2025, he won the Scottish Cup title.

==== Kasımpaşa ====
On 1 August 2025, Gueye joined Süper Lig club Kasımpaşa on a permanent transfer. He made his debut for his new club on 9 August, scoring in his side's 2–1 defeat to Antalyaspor in the league.

== Career statistics ==
As of match played 18 August 2025

Appearances and goals by club, season and competition
Club	Season	League			National cup (Note: Includes Norwegian Football Cup, Belgian Cup, Scottish Cup)		League cup (Note: Includes Scottish League Cup)		Europe		Total	
Club	Season	Division	Apps	Goals	Apps	Goals	Apps	Goals	Apps	Goals	Apps	Goals
Aalesund	2018	Norwegian First Division	28	12	0	0	–		–		28	12
Aalesund	2019	Norwegian First Division	29	13	2	0	–		–		31	13
Aalesund	Total		57	25	2	0	–		–		59	25
KV Kortrijk	2019–20	Belgian Pro League	4	1	0	0	–		–		4	1
KV Kortrijk	2020–21	Belgian Pro League	31	5	2	1	–		–		33	6
KV Kortrijk	2021–22	Belgian Pro League	16	5	2	1	–		–		18	6
KV Kortrijk	2022–23	Belgian Pro League	26	3	2	0	–		–		28	3
KV Kortrijk	2023–24	Belgian Pro League	1	0	0	0	–		–		1	0
KV Kortrijk	Total		78	14	6	2	–		–		84	16
Aberdeen	2023–24	Scottish Premiership	4	0	1	0	1	0	1 (Note: Appearance in UEFA Conference League)	0	7	0
Aberdeen	2024–25	Scottish Premiership	20	6	5	1	3	1	–		28	8
Aberdeen	Total		24	6	6	1	4	1	1	0	35	8
Kristiansund (loan)	2024	Eliteserien	15	4	3	2	–		–		18	6
Kasımpaşa	2025–26	Süper Lig	26	5	0	0	–		–		26	5
Career total			174	49	15	5	4	1	1	0	195	54

== Honours ==
Aberdeen

- Scottish Cup: 2024–25
