= Trent Sainsbury =

Australian soccer player (born 1992)

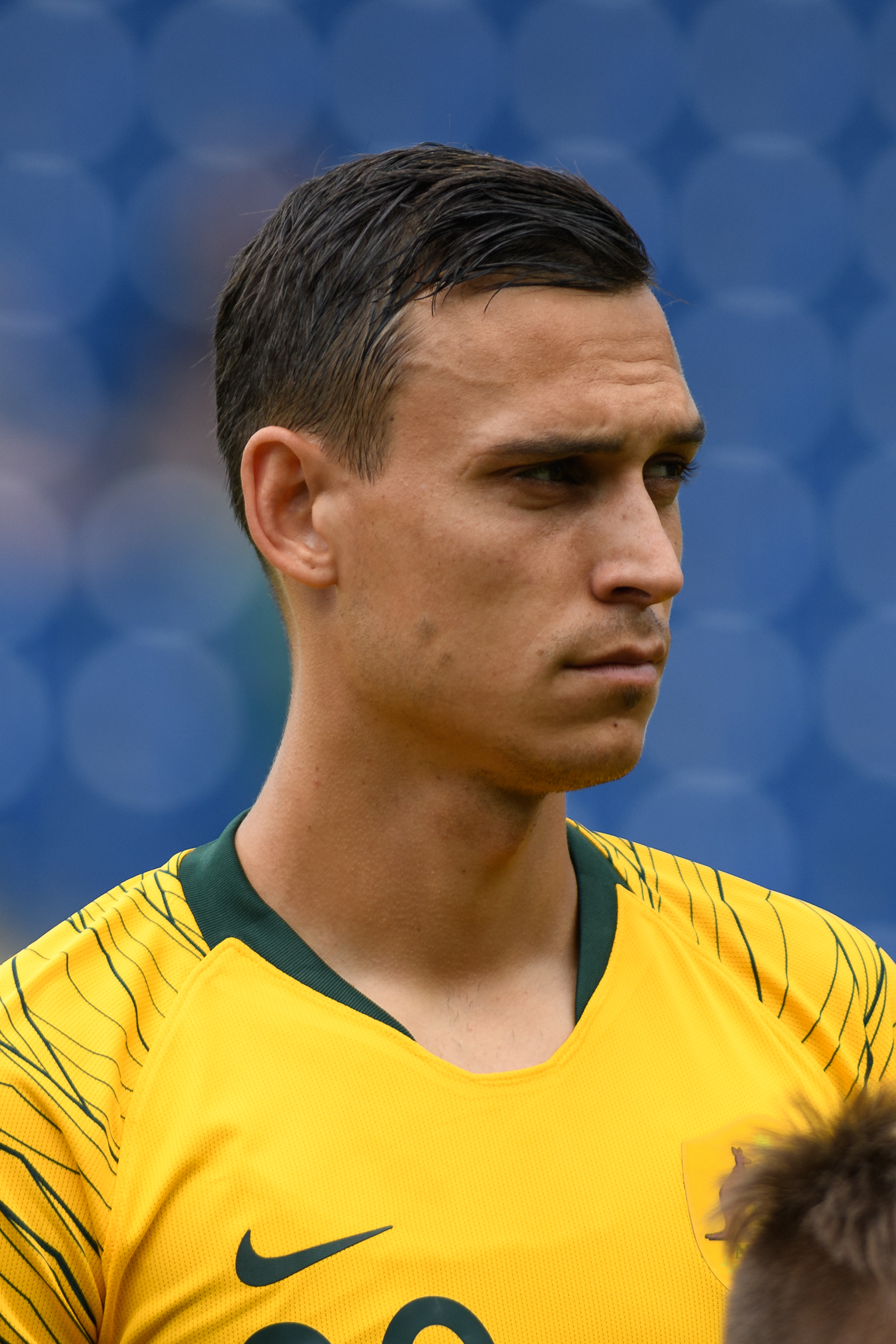
- Sainsbury with Australia in 2018

Personal information
- Full name: Trent Lucas Sainsbury
- Date of birth: 5 January 1992 (age 34)
- Place of birth: Thornlie, Western Australia, Australia
- Height: 1.83 m (6 ft 0 in)
- Position: Centre-back

Team information
- Current team: Central Coast Mariners
- Number: 4

Youth career
- Armadale SC
- 2008–2009: Perth Glory
- 2009–2010: AIS

Senior career*
Years	Team	Apps	(Gls)
2010–2014	Central Coast Mariners	60	(1)
2014–2016	PEC Zwolle	28	(1)
2016–2018	Jiangsu Suning	34	(2)
2017	→ Inter Milan (loan)	1	(0)
2018	→ Grasshoppers (loan)	9	(0)
2018–2019	PSV Eindhoven	6	(0)
2019–2020	Maccabi Haifa	31	(2)
2020–2022	Kortrijk	45	(6)
2022–2024	Al-Wakrah	39	(2)
2024–	Central Coast Mariners	16	(1)

International career^{‡}
2007–2009	Australia U17	12	(1)
2009–2011	Australia U20	9	(0)
2014–2022	Australia	61	(4)
Medal record
Representing Australia
AFC Asian Cup
Winner	2015 Australia
- * Club domestic league appearances and goals as of 21 April 2025 ‡ National team caps and goals as of 25 May 2024

Trent Lucas Sainsbury (born 5 January 1992) is an Australian professional soccer player who plays for Central Coast Mariners.

Sainsbury was born in Thornlie, Perth and played youth football with Perth Glory and the Australian Institute of Sport before starting his professional career with Central Coast Mariners. Sainsbury moved to PEC Zwolle in 2014.

Sainsbury made 61 appearances for the Australian national team. He was a member of the Australia team which won the 2015 AFC Asian Cup.

== Early life ==
Sainsbury was born in Thornlie, Perth, Western Australia. He attended Forest Crescent Primary School and Kelmscott Senior High School.

Trent started playing football at a very early age at Armadale Junior Soccer Club in Armadale, Western Australia.

== Club career ==
=== Youth ===
Sainsbury began his youth career at Perth Glory in 2008 before moving a year later to the AIS where he was part of their National Youth League squad in the 2009–10 season.

=== Central Coast Mariners ===
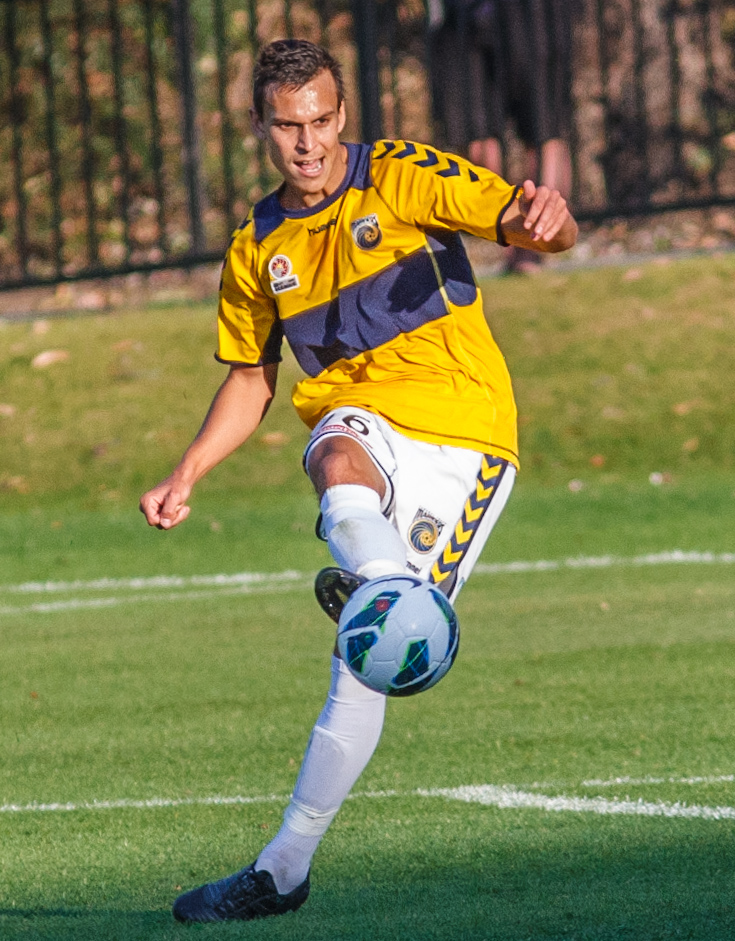
Sainsbury with the Mariners in 2012

In 2010, Sainsbury was signed by the Central Coast Mariners along with Sam Gallagher. Trent and Mariners teammate Marc Warren were selected to spend two weeks at Sheffield United's Academy as part of the two clubs' partnership. His senior debut came for the Mariners on 24 November 2010 in an F3 Derby draw with Newcastle Jets, with Sainsbury earning praise from coach Graham Arnold for his performance. Trent went on to make a total of nine appearances in the first team that year.

During the successful 2011–12 campaign, it was announced that Sainsbury had signed a two-year contract extension with the club. The Mariners went on to win the 2011–12 A-League Premiership. Trent again made nine league appearances for the club in this season.

After breaking into the first team in the 2012-13 A-League season, Sainsbury formed a formidable partnership alongside Dutch defender Patrick Zwaanswijk. This unit was central in helping the Mariners secure their maiden A-League Championship against Western Sydney Wanderers in the 2013 A-League Grand Final. The Mariners won the game 2–0 in front of 42,102 spectators at the Sydney Football Stadium. Commentator and former Socceroo Mark Bosnich rated Sainsbury as his man of the match. The official award went to Daniel McBreen. Following the game, it was speculated that Sainsbury had attracted serious interest from European clubs including Southampton, Roda JC, Basel and Middlesbrough.

In March 2013, Sainsbury was nominated for the NAB Young Footballer of the Year which was eventually won by Marco Rojas. Sainsbury was named the Mariners Player of the Year for the 2012–13 season. He was also named in the PFA A-League Team of the Season for 2012–13.

After the announcement of the first A-League All Stars match, Sainsbury was considered one of the main contenders for a place in the squad. He did not end up playing in the match due to international selection.

Sainsbury scored his first competitive goal for the Mariners on 3 April 2013, in a win over Guizhou Renhe in the 2013 AFC Champions League, his header with under ten minutes remaining proving to be the winner. His first A-League goal for the side came from a corner in a 2–1 win over Perth Glory in December 2013.

=== PEC Zwolle ===
==== 2013–14 season ====
Sainsbury signed for PEC Zwolle in the Dutch Eredivisie on a two and half year deal in January 2014. Sainsbury was immediately placed in the starting line-up, making his Eredivisie debut on 6 February 2014 in an away game against FC Utrecht. PEC won the game 2–1, but Sainsbury had to be replaced after 72 minutes after falling on a depressed sprinkler, hurting his knee in the process. It was discovered after the match that Sainsbury had fractured his kneecap on the sprinkler, an injury that would end up ruling him out for the remainder of the season. Fellow Australians Tommy Oar and Adam Sarota played in the match for Utrecht.

His club PEC did end the season on a high note when they won their first major trophy in the club's history by defeating league champions Ajax 5–1 in the 2014 KNVB Cup Final, also securing European football for the first time.

==== 2014–15 season ====
Recovered from his knee injury, Sainsbury was reinstated in PEC's starting lineup for their first game of the season - the 2014 Dutch Supercup. The game was played against the same team that PEC defeated to win the KNVB Cup, 2013–14 league champions Ajax. Sainsbury was part of a defence that kept a clean sheet in a 1–0 win, securing PEC's second major trophy in the club's history in the space of 4 months.

Sainsbury retained his place in the starting line-up for the first league game, at home against FC Utrecht. Lightning would strike again, as Sainsbury was subbed off with an ankle injury after 30 minutes of play, making it the second time in a row Sainsbury was forced out of a league game with an injury, both times against Utrecht. PEC won the game 2–0.

=== Jiangsu Suning ===
In January 2016, Sainsbury left PEC Zwolle on a $1.5 million transfer and signed a 3-year deal with Chinese Super League club Jiangsu Suning.

==== Loan to Inter Milan ====
On 31 January 2017, it was confirmed that Jiangsu Suning loaned Sainsbury to sister club Inter Milan until 30 June 2017. He made his debut on 28 May 2017 in a 5–2 win over Udinese in the last round of the season, coming on as a substitute for Davide Santon with twenty minutes to play. This made him the first Australian to make a senior appearance for Inter Milan (Nathan Coe and Carl Valeri, former Australian internationals, only played for their reserves).

==== Loan to Grasshoppers ====
In February 2018, Sainsbury moved on loan to Grasshoppers for the remainder of the 2017–18 Swiss Super League season.

=== PSV Eindhoven ===
In August 2018, Sainsbury signed a 3-year contract with Dutch champions, PSV Eindhoven.

=== Maccabi Haifa ===
On 30 August 2019, Sainsbury departed PSV for Israeli club Maccabi Haifa, joining the club on a two-year contract. Following new coach Barak Bakhar not being impressed with Sainsbury's conduct and following a groin injury during a training camp, Sainsbury was released in August 2020 after 31 appearances in which he scored twice.

=== Kortrijk ===
After leaving Maccabi Haifa, Sainsbury joined Belgian First Division A club Kortrijk on a two-year deal. He scored his first goal for Kortrijk, the final goal in a 5–5 draw against Beerschot on 10 November 2020.

=== Al-Wakrah ===
On 2 August 2022, he signed for Qatari club Al-Wakrah.

=== Return to Central Coast Mariners ===
On 23 August 2024, it was announced that Sainsbury had returned to the Central Coast Mariners, after ten years playing overseas. He joined on a three year contract. Sainsbury was named as the captain of the team for his first season back.

On 17 September 2024, Sainsbury played his first competitive match for the club since 2014, an AFC Champions League Elite match against Shandong Taishan in China. However, on the eve of the A-League season, Sainsbury suffered a pectoral injury which ruled him out for the first half of the season. Sainsbury returned from injury on 23 December 2024, against Macarthur FC at Campbelltown Sports Stadium. This marked Sainsbury's first appearance in the A-League since January 2014.

In the Mariners' second last game of the season, against Macarthur FC, Sainsbury scored his first goal for the club since 2013, but unfortunately ruptured his achilles tendon late in the match.

== International career ==
=== Under-17 ===
Sainsbury was a member of the Australia U-17 team which attended the 2008 AFF U-16 Youth Championship. The team won the tournament after beating Bahrain in a penalty shootout in the final. He also played for the squad for the 2008 AFC U-16 Championship, scoring a goal in a loss to the UAE in the quarter-finals which saw Australia miss out on qualification for the 2009 FIFA U-17 World Cup.

=== Under-20 ===
Sainsbury was selected in Australia's squad for the 2011 FIFA U-20 World Cup where Australia finished bottom of their group with one draw and two losses. He played in all three of Australia's matches.

=== Senior ===
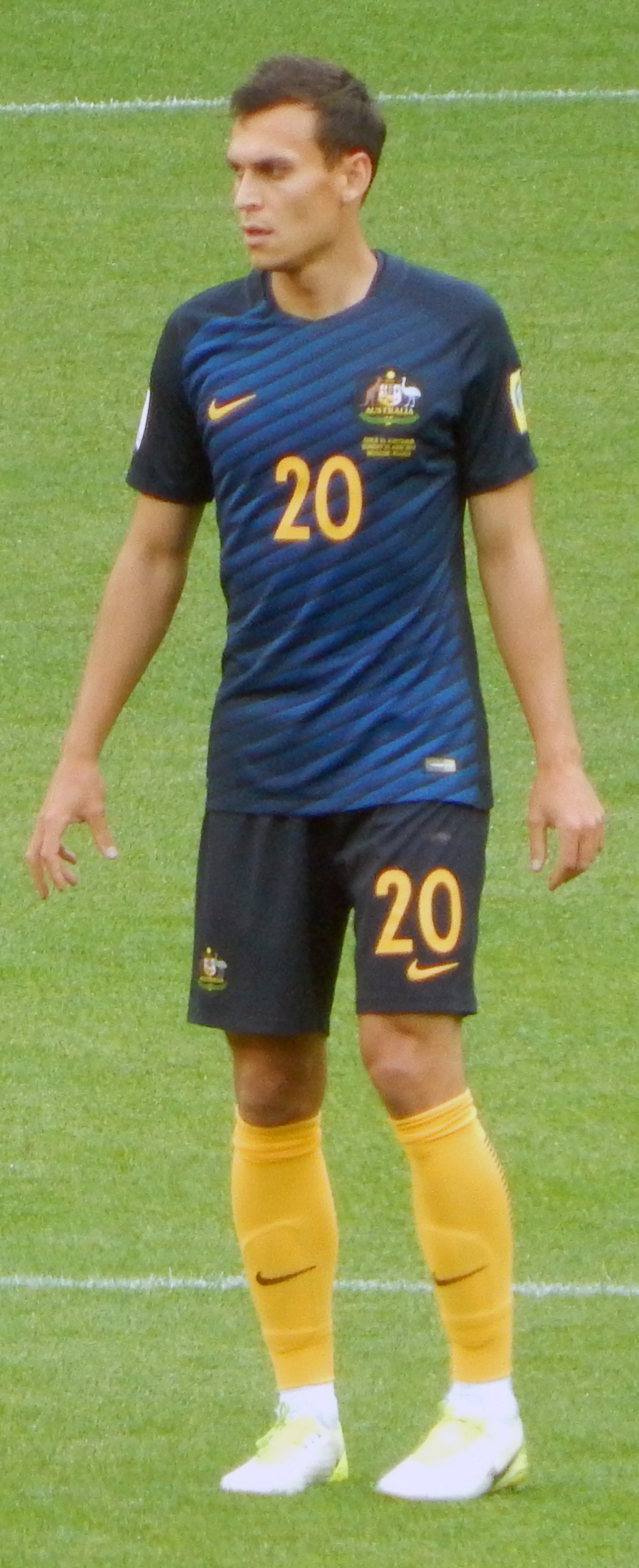
Trent playing for Australia at the 2017 Confederations Cup

In May 2013, Trent was selected in a Socceroos Australian-based training squad for upcoming World Cup qualifiers. In July 2013, he made Australia's squad for the 2013 EAFF East Asian Cup. Despite strong club form, Sainsbury was the only outfield player in the squad not to be used by coach Holger Osieck in the tournament, which he suggested may have been due to Osieck mistaking his laid-back attitude for a lack of commitment.

Sainsbury's chances of playing in the 2014 FIFA World Cup were ultimately ended by a knee injury suffered playing for PEC Zwolle.

In September 2014, Sainsbury made his International debut for Australia in a 2–0 loss to Belgium in a friendly. He later admitted to having been nervous before the game but earned praise from coach Ange Postecoglou for his performance against a strong opponent.

Sainsbury was selected as part of Australia's 2015 AFC Asian Cup squad. He started in Australia's first group game against Kuwait, a match which Australia won 4-1. He also started Australia's second group game against Oman, providing the assist for Matt McKay to open the scoring in a 4-0 win by heading a Massimo Luongo corner goalwards. Sainsbury scored his first ever international goal in the semi-final against the United Arab Emirates. Under three minutes into the game, he headed a corner from Massimo Luongo in at the far post to give Australia the lead in a match they ultimately won 2–0. He also played for Australia in the Final victory over South Korea and was named as Man of the Match following an imposing defensive display. Trent was named in the official team of the tournament after a number of solid performances.

In May 2018, he was named in Australia's 23-man squad for the 2018 FIFA World Cup in Russia. In November 2022, he was not included in Australia's 26-man squad for the 2022 FIFA World Cup in Qatar.

== Personal life ==
Sainsbury's partner, Elissa, is the daughter of Australian football manager and former Socceroos coach Graham Arnold.

In addition to holding an Australian passport, Sainsbury also holds a UK passport.

== Career statistics ==
=== Club ===
As of 19 May 2023

Club	Season	League			Cup		League Cup		Continental		Total	
Club	Season	Division	Apps	Goals	Apps	Goals	Apps	Goals	Apps	Goals	Apps	Goals
Central Coast Mariners	2010–11	A-League	9	0	0	0	—		0	0	9	0
Central Coast Mariners	2011–12	A-League	9	0	0	0	—		2	0	11	0
Central Coast Mariners	2012–13	A-League	26	0	0	0	—		7	1	33	1
Central Coast Mariners	2013–14	A-League	16	1	0	0	—		0	0	16	1
Central Coast Mariners	Total		60	1	0	0	0	0	9	1	69	2
PEC Zwolle	2013–14	Eredivisie	1	0	0	0	—		—		1	0
PEC Zwolle	2014–15	Eredivisie	18	0	4	0	—		2	0	24	0
PEC Zwolle	2015–16	Eredivisie	9	1	0	0	—		—		9	1
PEC Zwolle	Total		28	1	4	0	0	0	2	0	34	1
Jiangsu Suning	2016	Chinese Super League	29	2	6	0	—		6	0	41	2
Jiangsu Suning	2017	Chinese Super League	5	0	0	0	—		0	0	5	0
Jiangsu Suning	Total		34	2	6	0	0	0	6	0	46	2
Inter Milan (loan)	2016–17	Serie A	1	0	0	0	—		0	0	1	0
Grasshoppers (loan)	2017–18	Swiss Super League	9	0	0	0	—		0	0	9	0
PSV Eindhoven	2018–19	Eredivisie	5	0	2	1	—		2	0	9	1
PSV Eindhoven	2019–20	Eredivisie	1	0	0	0	—		0	0	1	0
PSV Eindhoven	Total		6	0	2	1	0	0	2	0	10	1
Maccabi Haifa	2019–20	Israeli Premier League	31	2	2	0	—		—		33	2
Kortrijk	2020–21	Belgian First Division A	17	2	2	0	—		—		19	2
Kortrijk	2021–22	Belgian First Division A	28	4	3	0	—		—		31	4
Kortrijk	Total		45	6	5	0	0	0	0	0	50	6
Al-Wakrah	2022–23	Qatar Stars League	20	2	1	0	2	0	—		23	2
Career total			233	14	20	1	2	0	19	1	274	16

=== International ===
As of 7 June 2021

Australia
Year	Apps	Goals
2014	4	0
2015	8	1
2016	9	2
2017	12	0
2018	9	0
2019	6	0
2021	8	1
2022	5	0
Total	61	4

As of match played 22 September 2022. Australia score listed first, score column indicates score after each Sainsbury goal.

International goals by date, venue, cap, opponent, score, result and competition
No.	Date	Venue	Cap	Opponent	Score	Result	Competition
1	27 January 2015	Newcastle International Sports Centre, Newcastle, Australia	9	United Arab Emirates	1–0	2–0	2015 AFC Asian Cup
2	7 June 2016	Docklands Stadium, Melbourne, Australia	16	Greece	1–2	1–2	Friendly
3	6 October 2016	King Abdullah Sports City, Jeddah, Saudi Arabia	19	Saudi Arabia	1–1	2–2	2018 FIFA World Cup qualification
4	7 June 2021	Jaber Al-Ahmad International Stadium, Kuwait City, Kuwait	49	Chinese Taipei	3–0	5–1	2022 FIFA World Cup qualification

== Honours ==
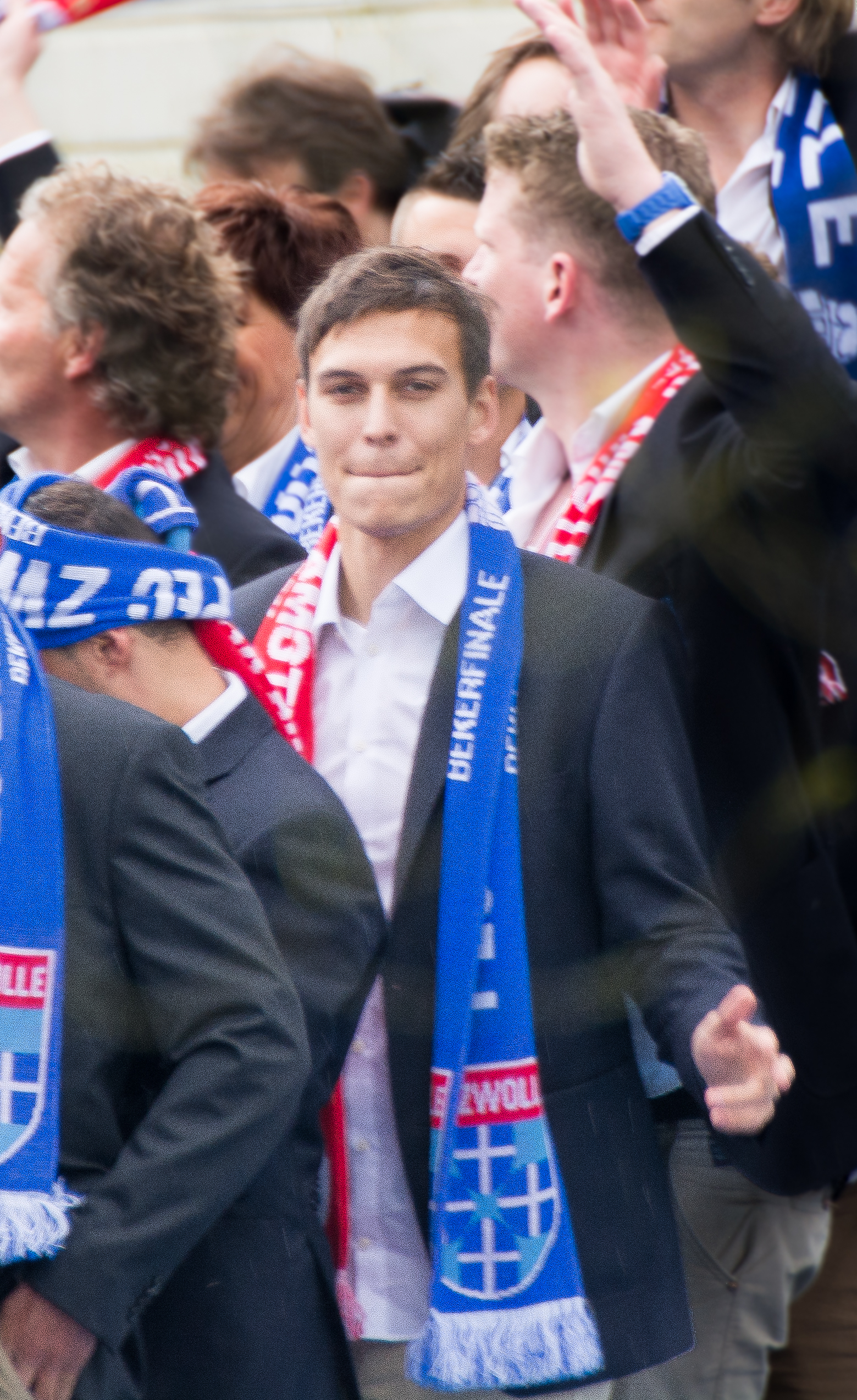
Sainsbury after PEC Zwolle won the 2013–14 KNVB Cup.

=== Club ===
Central Coast Mariners

- A-League Premiership: 2011–12
- A-League Championship: 2012–13

=== International ===
Australia

- AFC Asian Cup: 2015
- AFF U-16 Youth Championship: 2008

=== Individual ===
- Mariners Medal: 2012–13
- Oceania Footballer of the Year: 2013
- PFA A-League Team of the Season: 2012–13
- 2015 AFC Asian Cup Man of the Match: Final vs. South Korea
- AFC Asian Cup Team of the Tournament: 2015

== See also ==
- List of Central Coast Mariners FC players
- List of foreign football players in the Netherlands
