= Ante Palaversa =

Croatian footballer (born 2000)

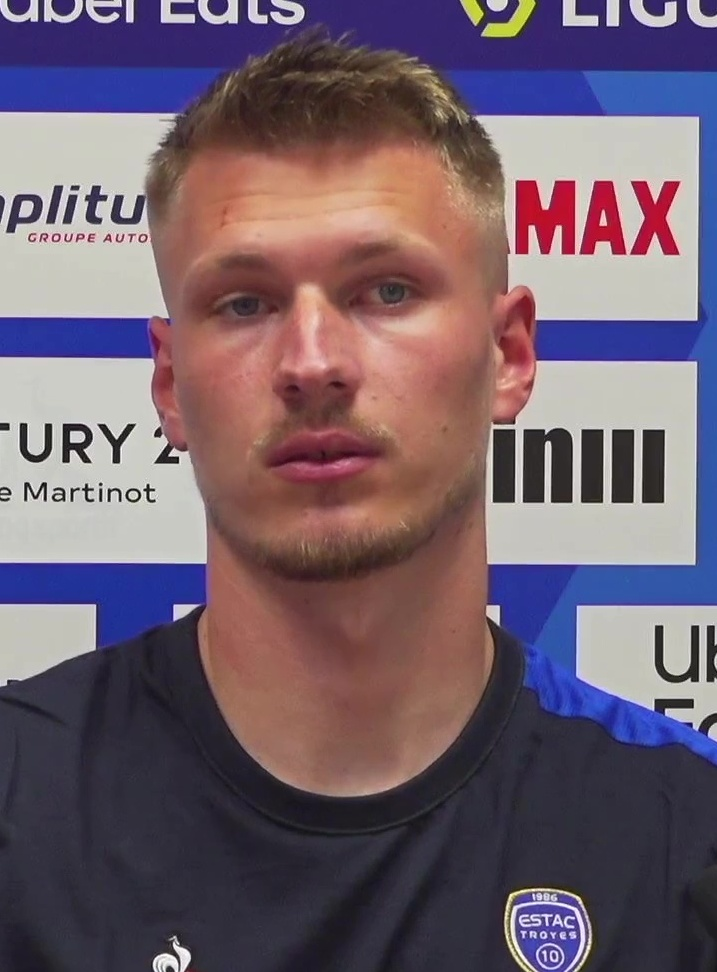
- Palaversa with Troyes in 2022

Personal information
- Full name: Ante Palaversa
- Date of birth: 6 April 2000 (age 26)
- Place of birth: Split, Croatia
- Height: 1.87 m (6 ft 2 in)
- Position: Defensive midfielder

Team information
- Current team: Aberdeen
- Number: 18

Youth career
- Hajduk Split

Senior career*
Years	Team	Apps	(Gls)
2017–2018	Hajduk Split II	19	(2)
2018–2019	Hajduk Split	14	(2)
2019–2022	Manchester City	0	(0)
2019	→ Hajduk Split (loan)	11	(0)
2019–2020	→ Oostende (loan)	19	(2)
2020–2021	→ Getafe (loan)	2	(0)
2021–2022	→ Kortrijk (loan)	39	(3)
2022–2024	Troyes	9	(1)
2022–2024	Troyes B	3	(0)
2024–	Aberdeen	44	(2)

International career^{‡}
2014	Croatia U14	2	(0)
2015	Croatia U15	5	(1)
2015–2016	Croatia U16	12	(2)
2016	Croatia U17	12	(0)
2017–2018	Croatia U18	4	(1)
2017–2019	Croatia U19	14	(4)
2021	Croatia U20	4	(0)
2021–2023	Croatia U21	12	(0)
- * Club domestic league appearances and goals as of 20 May 2026 ‡ National team caps and goals as of 27 June 2023

Ante Palaversa (born 6 April 2000) is a Croatian professional footballer who plays as a defensive midfielder for Scottish Premiership club Aberdeen.

== Club career ==
=== Hajduk Split ===
Born in Split, Croatia, Palaversa started his youth career with the Hajduk Split academy. At the end of the 2016–17 season, he won the Best Player of the Youth League award and was subsequently promoted to the reserve team. After playing regularly for the reserve team in the second tier, he was promoted to the senior team in June 2018 by manager Željko Kopić. On 26 July 2018, Palaversa made his first team debut, coming on as a substitute in a 1–0 victory over Bulgarian club Slavia Sofia in a UEFA Europa League qualifying match. On 26 August, he scored his first goal for the club in a 2–2 draw against Inter Zaprešić, scoring a volley from 21-metres.

=== Manchester City ===
On 28 January 2019, it was announced that Palaversa would be joining Manchester City for an eventual fee of €7 million, instantly returning to Hajduk on loan. He completed the move on 31 January.

==== Loan to Getafe ====
On 31 August 2020, Palaversa joined Getafe on loan.

==== Loan to KV Kortrijk ====
On 26 January 2021, Palaversa moved to Belgian club KV Kortrijk on loan until the end of the season.

=== Troyes ===
On 31 August 2022, having never made an appearance for City, Palaversa joined Troyes, another club within the City Football Group, on a three-year contract.

=== Aberdeen ===
On 8 August 2024, Palaversa signed for Scottish Premiership club Aberdeen on a one-year contract, with the Scottish Premiership club having the option of a further two years, which was exercised in January 2025 with the club extending his stay until summer 2027.

== Career statistics ==
As of match played on 24 May 2025

Appearances and goals by club, season and competition
Club	Season	League			National cup (Note: Includes Croatian Football Cup, Copa del Rey, Belgian Cup, Scottish Cup)		League cup (Note: Includes Scottish League Cup)		Europe		Total	
Club	Season	Division	Apps	Goals	Apps	Goals	Apps	Goals	Apps	Goals	Apps	Goals
Hajduk Split	2018–19	Prva HNL	12	2	2	0	–		1 (Note: Appearance in UEFA Europa League)	0	15	2
Getafe (loan)	2020–21	La Liga	2	0	1	0	–		–		3	0
Kortrijk (loan)	2020–21	Belgian Pro League	9	2	1	0	–		–		10	2
Kortrijk (loan)	2021–22	Belgian Pro League	30	1	3	0	–		–		33	1
Kortrijk (loan)	Total		39	3	4	0	–		–		43	3
Troyes	2022–23	Ligue 1	2	1	0	0	–		–		2	1
Troyes	2023–24	Ligue 2	7	0	0	0	–		–		7	0
Troyes	Total		9	1	0	0	–		–		9	1
Aberdeen	2024–25	Scottish Premiership	30	2	5	0	2	0	–		37	2
Career total			92	8	12	0	2	0	1	0	107	8

== Honours ==
Aberdeen

- Scottish Cup: 2024–25
