= Yani Van den Bossche =

Belgian footballer

Personal information
- Date of birth: 1 June 2001 (age 25)
- Place of birth: Belgium
- Height: 1.75 m (5 ft 9 in)
- Position: Winger

Team information
- Current team: Gullegem
- Number: 10

Youth career
- Kortrijk

Senior career*
Years	Team	Apps	(Gls)
2020–2021	Kortrijk	8	(0)
2021–2023	Knokke	61	(4)
2023–2024	KSV Oostkamp	34	(2)
2024–2025	Harelbeke	30	(3)
2025–	Gullegem	0	(0)
- * Club domestic league appearances and goals as of 12:19, 22 January 2026 (UTC)

Yani Van den Bossche (born 1 June 2001) is a Belgian professional footballer who plays as a winger for Gullegem.

== Club career ==
Van den Bossche made his professional debut for Kortrijk in a 2-1 Belgian First Division A win over K.V. Mechelen on 17 October 2020.

On 17 August 2021, he signed a two-year contract with Knokke in the third-tier Belgian National Division 1.
