= Faïz Selemani =

Footballer (born 1993)

Personal information
- Date of birth: 14 November 1993 (age 33)
- Place of birth: Marseille, France
- Height: 1.82 m (6 ft 0 in)
- Position: Winger

Team information
- Current team: Qatar SC
- Number: 7

Youth career
- Marseille

Senior career*
Years	Team	Apps	(Gls)
2014–2015	Consolat Marseille	25	(6)
2015–2016	Chamois Niortais	30	(3)
2016–2018	Lorient	19	(2)
2017	→ Tours (loan)	16	(2)
2018	→ Ajaccio (loan)	13	(1)
2018–2019	Union SG	31	(19)
2019–2023	Kortrijk	94	(30)
2023–2024	Al-Hazem	26	(7)
2024–2025	Al-Riyadh	28	(6)
2025–	Qatar SC	27	(3)

International career^{‡}
2017–2025	Comoros	41	(7)
- * Club domestic league appearances and goals as of 17 November 2026 ‡ National team caps and goals as of 17 November 2026

Faïz Selemani (born 14 November 1993) is a professional footballer who plays as a winger for Qatar Stars League club Qatar SC. Born in France, he plays for the Comoros national team.

== Club career ==
As a youth, Selemani played with Marseille up to under-18 level before dropping into lower-league local football. He joined Championnat National side Consolat Marseille ahead of the 2014–15 season and scored two goals in 21 league appearances during his first year at the club. After scoring four goals in the first four games of the 2015–16 campaign, Selemani was signed by Ligue 2 club Chamois Niortais on 31 August 2015 on a three-year contract.

On 24 June 2016, Selemani joined Ligue 1 side Lorient on a four-year contract.

On 19 August 2019, Selemani signed a three-year contract with Belgian club Kortrijk. He joined Saudi Professional League club Al-Hazem on 23 July 2023 for a transfer fee of €1.5 million.

On 18 August 2024, Selemani joined Al-Riyadh.

On 1 July 2025, Selemani joined Qatar Stars League club Qatar SC.

On 11 December 2025, Selemani was called up to the Comoros squad for the 2025 Africa Cup of Nations.

== International career ==
Selemani was called up to the Comoros for 2019 Africa Cup of Nations qualifier against Malawi on 10 June 2017. He made his debut in a friendly 1–1 against Madagascar on 11 November 2017, wherein he assisted his side's only goal.

== Career statistics ==
=== Club ===
As of match played 26 May 2025

Appearances and goals by club, season and competition
Club	Season	League			National cup (Note: Includes Coupe de France, Belgian Cup)		League cup (Note: Includes Coupe de la Ligue)		Other		Total	
Club	Season	Division	Apps	Goals	Apps	Goals	Apps	Goals	Apps	Goals	Apps	Goals
Consolat Marseille	2014–15	National	21	2	5	0	0	0	—		26	2
Consolat Marseille	2015–16	National	4	4	0	0	0	0	—		4	4
Consolat Marseille	Total		25	6	5	0	0	0	—		30	6
Chamois Niortais	2015–16	Ligue 2	30	3	3	1	0	0	—		33	4
Lorient	2016–17	Ligue 1	3	0	0	0	0	0	—		3	0
Lorient	2017–18	Ligue 2	16	2	0	0	3	0	—		19	2
Lorient	Total		19	2	0	3	0	0	—		22	2
Tours (loan)	2016–17	Ligue 2	16	2	0	0	0	0	—		16	2
Ajaccio (loan)	2017–18	Ligue 2	12	1	0	0	0	0	1	0	13	1
Union SG	2018–19	Belgian First Division B	20	9	4	0	—		10	8	34	17
Union SG	2019–20	Belgian First Division B	1	2	0	0	—		—		1	2
Union SG	Total		21	11	4	0	—		10	8	35	19
Kortrijk	2019–20	Belgian First Division A	7	1	2	0	—		—		9	1
Kortrijk	2020–21	Belgian First Division A	30	8	2	2	—		—		32	10
Kortrijk	2021–22	Belgian First Division A	29	13	3	0	—		—		32	13
Kortrijk	2022–23	Belgian Pro League	28	8	2	0	—		—		30	8
Kortrijk	Total		94	30	9	2	—		—		103	32
Al-Hazem	2023–24	Saudi Pro League	26	7	2	2	—		—		28	9
Al-Riyadh	2024–25	Saudi Pro League	28	6	2	1	—		—		30	7
Career total			271	68	25	6	3	0	11	8	310	82

=== International ===
As of match played 9 June 2025

Appearances and goals by national team and year
National team	Year	Apps	Goals
Comoros	2017	1	0
Comoros	2018	3	0
Comoros	2019	6	1
Comoros	2020	1	0
Comoros	2021	6	2
Comoros	2022	6	1
Comoros	2023	5	0
Comoros	2024	10	3
Comoros	2025	3	0
Total		41	7

Scores and results list Comoros goal tally first, score column indicates score after each Selemani goal.

List of international goals scored by Faïz Selemani
No.	Date	Venue	Opponent	Score	Result	Competition
1.	14 November 2019	Stade de Kégué, Lomé, Togo	Togo	1–0	1–0	2021 Africa Cup of Nations qualification
2.	1 September 2021	Stade Omnisports de Malouzini, Moroni, Comoros	Seychelles	1–0	7–1	Friendly
3.	31 December 2021	Prince Abdullah Al-Faisal Sports City, Jeddah, Saudi Arabia	Malawi	1–2	1–2	Friendly
4.	27 September 2022	Père Jégo Stadium, Casablanca, Morocco	Burkina Faso	1–2	1–2	Friendly
5.	22 March 2024	Marrakesh Stadium, Marrakesh, Morocco	Uganda	2–0	4–0	Friendly
6.	22 March 2024	Marrakesh Stadium, Marrakesh, Morocco	Uganda	4–0	4–0	Friendly
7.	15 October 2024	Felix Houphouet Boigny Stadium, Abidjan, Ivory Coast	Tunisia	1–0	1–1	2025 Africa Cup of Nations qualification
