= Teddy Chevalier =

French footballer (born 1987)

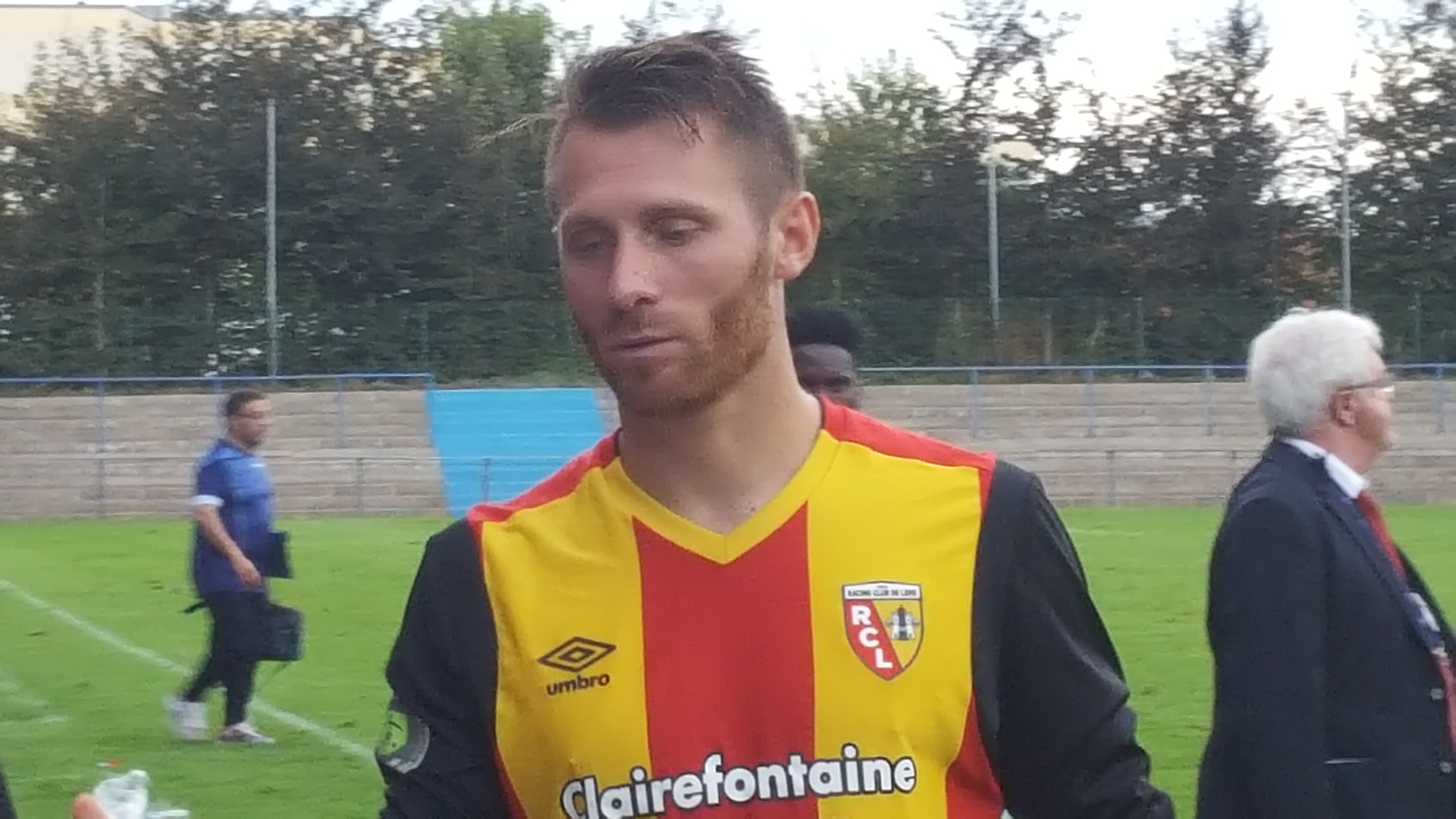
- Chevalier with Lens B in 2016

Personal information
- Full name: Teddy Étienne Chevalier
- Date of birth: 28 June 1987 (age 39)
- Place of birth: Denain, Nord, France
- Height: 1.80 m (5 ft 11 in)
- Position: Forward

Team information
- Current team: Cambrai

Senior career*
Years	Team	Apps	(Gls)
2007–2009	Gueugnon	25	(0)
2009	Boussu Dour Borinage	5	(2)
2009–2012	Zulte Waregem	94	(19)
2012–2013	RKC Waalwijk	29	(8)
2013–2015	Kortrijk	59	(18)
2015–2016	Çaykur Rizespor	23	(1)
2016–2017	Lens	2	(0)
2016–2017	Lens B	4	(3)
2017–2019	Kortrijk	105	(34)
2019–2021	Valenciennes	44	(15)
2021	Kortrijk	21	(2)
2021–2022	Mouscron	25	(5)
2022–2023	Francs Borains	44	(31)
2024–2025	Mons	37	(11)
2025	Saint-Amand FC		
2025–	Cambrai	0	(0)
- * Club domestic league appearances and goals as of 1 February 2026

Teddy Étienne Chevalier (born 28 June 1987) is a French professional footballer who plays as a forward for Cambrai.

== Club career ==
=== Early career in France ===
Chevalier started out at FC Denain, US Denain, AC Cambrai and Valenciennes. However, he left Valenciennes after Manager Antoine Kombouaré decided to let him go. He then joined Gueugnon on 7 August 2007, where he signed a two–year contract, which was his first professional contract.

Chevalier made his Gueugon debut on 24 August 2007, where he came on as late substitute, in a 1–0 loss against Stade de Reims. After spending seven months away from the first team, he made his first appearance on 21 March 2008, in a 1–1 draw against Grenoble. At the end of the season, where he made 13 appearances in all competitions, mostly coming on as a substitute, the club were relegated to the third tier National.

After making 16 appearances for the side in all competitions during the 2008–09 season, it was announced on 6 January 2009 that Chevalier was loaned out to Boussu Dour Borinage for the rest of the season, where they were playing in Belgian Third Division. He later describe this as “career a new boost”. During his time at Boussu Dour Borinage, Chevalier scored twice in five appearances against Wezel Sport and VW Hamme. At the end of the season, the club were promoted to the Second Division for the first time in their history.

=== Zulte Waregem ===
On 12 June 2009, Chevalier joined Belgian Pro League side Zulte Waregem, signing a three–year contract with the club.

Chevalier made his Zulte Waregem debut in the opening game of the season, where he came on as a substitute in the 60th minute, in a 1–1 draw against Lokeren. He then scored his first goal in a follow–up match against Genk and then Cercle Brugge. Since making his debut, he quickly established himself in the first team, playing as a striker. Chevalier scored between 26 September 2009 and 17 October 2009 against Gent, Sint-Truidense and Germinal Beerschot. By the end of 2009, he went to score nine goals for the side. His performance attracted interest from league's rival, Anderlecht in January but the move never happened and he stayed at the club. Amid to the transfer move, he added his 11th and 12th goal in two matches against Germinal Beerschot and Standard Liège on 7 March 2010 and 14 March 2010 respectively. Despite suffering an injury later in the season, Chevalier finished his first season at Zulte Waregem, making 36 appearances and scoring 13 goals in all competitions.

Ahead of the 2010–11 season, Chevalier was linked a move to Eredivisie side FC Twente. Although the move never happened, he, however, missed several matches in the pre–season as a result of a second-degree burns on both of his legs. He made his return on 10 August 2010, coming on as a substitute for Jeremy Bokila in the 64th minute, in a 2–1 win over KV Mechelen. It wasn't until on 19 September 2010 when he scored his first goal of the season, in a 5–3 loss against Gent. In a follow up match against Germinal Beerschot three days later, on 22 September 2010, Chevalier set up two late goals, in a 4–3 win. After appearing twice as unused substitute around between late–October and early–November, Chevalier scored his second goal of the season on 21 November 2010, in a 2–0 win over Standard Liège. He continued to remain in the first team for the side until he was demoted to the reserve for his unprofessional behaviour along with Ernest Webnje Nfor and Rémi Maréval. Chevalier didn't return to the first team in mid–March after the club recalled him back. Since returning to the first team, Chevalier helped the side win three matches in a row for the Group B of Europa League Playoff, but finished second place, failing to qualify for the UEFA Europa League playoff final. At the end of the 2010–11 season, Chevalier went on to make 31 appearances and scoring 4 times in all competitions.

In the 2011–12 season, Chevalier continued to feature in the first team despite being placed on the substitute bench in number of matches. It wasn't until on 26 November 2011 when Chevalier scored his first goal of the season, in a 3–2 loss against Anderlecht. Three weeks later, on 17 December 2011, he scored again, in a 3–2 loss against R.A.E.C. Mons. A month later, on 25 January 2012, Chevalier scored his third goal of the season, in a 1–0 win over Beerschot AC. As the season progressed, Chevalier continued to remain in the first team until he was suspended for the rest of the season, due to disciplinary problems. At the end of the 2011–12 season, he went on to make 31 appearances and scoring 3 times in all competitions.

=== RKC Waalwijk ===
On 25 July 2012, Chevalier moved to Netherlands when he joined Eredivisie side RKC Waalwijk, signing a three–year contract with the club after a successful trial. It came after when Zulte Waregem told him that he can leave the club.

Chevalier made his RKC Waalwijk debut in the opening game of the season against PSV Eindhoven, where he started the whole game and set up a goal for Rodney Sneijder, who scored the winning goal, in a 3–2 win. In a follow up match against ADO Den Haag, he scored his first goals, in a 2–2 draw. He then scored in a 1–1 draw against VVV-Venlo on 22 September 2012, followed by scoring twice against FC Lisse, in a 5–1 win in the second round of KNVB Beker and then scoring five days later, in a 3–3 draw against AZ Alkmaar. Between 4 November 2012 and 10 November 2012, he scored two goals in two matches against NAC Breda and FC Utrecht. His eighth goal came on 16 December 2012, in a 2–2 draw against SBV Vitesse. However, in a follow–up match against Willem II on 23 December 2012, he was sent–off for a second bookable offence, in a 0–0 draw. After the match, his sending–off against Willem II received criticism from Manager Erwin Koeman.

After making amends with Koeman and serving a one match suspension, Chevalier returned to the first team on 26 January 2013, in a 4–0 loss against NAC Breda. However, he struggled to score more goals for the rest of the season. However, before the match against ADO Den Haag on 31 March 2013, Chevalier was suspended for poor attitude at training and was dropped from the first team. After missing two matches, he returned to the first team on 14 April 2013, in a 1–1 draw against Feyenoord.

On 8 May 2013, it was announced that Chevalier and the club agreed to terminate his contract, effective immediately. By the time of his departure, Chevalier made 31 appearances and scoring 11 times in all competitions for RKC Waalwijk

=== KV Kortrijk ===
After leaving RKC Waalwijk, Chevalier returned to Belgium, where he signed for Kortrijk, having agreed a three–year contract.

Chevalier made his Kortijk debut in the opening game of the season, where he started and played 65 minutes, in a 1–0 win over OH Leuven. In a match against Lokeren on 9 August 2013, he set up a goal for Ivan Santini, who went on to score a hat–trick, in a 3–3 draw. Since joining the club, he established himself in the first team, where he played as a striker and formed a partnership with Santini. Although he struggled to score, as well as, being on the substitute bench in September, his first goal for the club didn't come until on 21 December 2013, in a 5–2 loss against KV Mechelen. However, he remained out of the first team, due to his own injury concern and being on the substitute bench for several games. In the league's playoff for the UEFA Europa League spot, he quickly made an impressive display for the side when he set up a goal for Thomas Matton, who scored twice, in a 4–0 win over Cercle Brugge on 29 March 2014. On 12 April 2014, he scored his first goal (and his first goal in four months), in a 4–1 win over Mechelen. Two weeks later, on 26 April 2014, Chevalier scored twice and set up one of the goals, in a 4–0 win over Cercle Brugge. This followed up by scoring twice, in a 2–1 win over Charleroi, a win that saw Kortrijk reach the league's playoff final for the UEFA Europa League spot against Oostende. Six days later in the first leg against Oostende, he scored the club's first goal of the game, in a 2–2 draw. However, the club played in the second leg and ultimately lost after Oostende won on penalties after drawing 4–4 on aggregate, with Chevalier successfully converting one of the penalty shoot–out. In his first season at Kortrijk, Chevalier went on to make 26 appearances and scoring 7 times in all competitions.

However, ahead of the 2014–15 season, Chevalier was suspended for two matches after footage shown him making contact on Michiel Jonckheere and was spotted unnoticed by the referee during a second leg match against Oostende. After serving a two match suspension, he made his first appearance of the season, where he started the whole game, in a 2–1 win over Mechelen on 9 August 2014. It wasn't until on 14 September 2014 when he scored his first goal for the club, as well as, setting up another goal, in a 3–2 loss against Lokeren. Two weeks later, on 27 September 2014, he scored twice, as well as, setting up another goal, in a 3–0 win over Royal Excel Mouscron. Chevalier continued to feature as a striker in the first team. He then scored two goals in two matches between 30 November 2014 and 6 December 2014 against Standard Liège and Mechelen. Over the next two months, Chevalier scored a brace on two occasions against Oostende on 17 January 2015 and Westerlo on 21 February 2015, both of which were heavy victories for Kortrijk. He then played a vital role when he scored the only goal in the game, in a 1–0 win over Cercle Brugge to ensure their place in the Championship Playoff on 7 March 2015. In the Championship Play-offs, he scored once, which was against Anderlecht, in a 5–1 loss on 25 April 2015. However, the club finished last place in the Championship Play–Off. At the end of the 2014–15 season, Chevalier went on to make 39 appearances and scoring 12 times in all competitions.

=== Çaykur Rizespor ===
Although he was offered a new contract by K.V. Kortrijk, Chevalier was linked a move away, as clubs from Turkish Süper Lig were keen on signing him. It was announced that he moved to Çaykur Rizespor for transfer fee of 750,000 euros on 30 July 2015.

Chevalier made his Çaykur Rizespor debut, where he started and played 45 minutes before coming off in the second half, in a 3–2 win over Gençlerbirliği in the opening game of the season. After being sidelined due to a health problem, he made his return from the sidelines, where he came on as a substitute in the 68th minute, in a 0–0 draw against Kayserispor on 28 October 2015. In a follow up match against Galatasaray on 7 November 2015, he set up a goal for Mehmet Akyüz, who scored twice, in a 4–2 win. Later in December, he scored three times in the Turkish Cup against Konyaspor and Bucaspor (twice). It wasn't until on 12 March 2016 when he scored again, in a 2–1 loss against Beşiktaş. However, towards the end of the 2015–16 season, he was plagued by injury. Despite this, he went on to make 30 appearances and scoring 4 times in all competitions.

=== Lens ===
On 19 June 2016, Chevalier returned to France since 2009 when he signed for RC Lens, signing a two–years contract.

Chevalier made his RC Lens debut, where he came on as a late substitute, in a 2–0 win over Nîmes Olympique on 15 August 2016. In the second round of the Coupe De La Ligue, he made his first start for the side against Paris, but the match saw Lens eliminated after losing 7–6 in the penalty shoot–out, which Chevalier missed the deciding penalty. However, he only made three appearances for the side. As of a result, Chevalier was sent to the reserve side. By January, without making another appearance for RC Lens since August, he was expected to leave the club. Since leaving the club, Chevalier reflected about his time there and his falling out with Manager Alain Casanova.

=== KV Kortrijk ===
With his first team opportunities at RC Lens became limited, Chevalier moved back to Belgium, where he re–joined KV Kortrijk on 6 January 2017, signing a two–year contract.

Chevalier scored on his second debut for KV Kortrijk on 21 January 2017, where he started and played 73 minutes before coming off, due to an injury, in a 3–2 loss against Zulte Waregem. Although he recovered shortly after from an injury, he scored twice on 28 January 2017, in a 2–1 win over Lokeren. In a follow up against Standard Liège on 4 February 2017, he scored and set up of the goals, in a 3–0 win. Having established himself in the first team at KV Kortrijk, he went on to make 19 appearances and scoring 4 times in all competitions this season.

In the 2017–18 season, Chevalier continued to feature in the first team for the side and then scored his first goal of the season, in a 2–1 win over Eupen on 12 August 2017. He then scored two goals in two games on 9 September 2017 and 16 September 2017 against Zulte Waregem and Anderlecht. Over the next two months, he suffered a goal drought and didn't score again until 18 November 2017, in a 3–2 win over Sint-Truidense. Throughout December, he went on a goalscoring streak, scoring against Waasland-Beveren, Gent, KV Mechelen and Genk (twice). In a follow up match against Standard Liège on 27 December 2017, he captained the side for the first time, in a 2–1 win. After this, he then scored two goals in two games on 20 January 2018 and 23 January 2018 against Oostende and Royal Excel Mouscron. On 10 February 2018, Chevalier scored a hat–trick (and first in his professional career), in a 4–0 win over Royal Antwerp. Shortly after, he signed a contract with the club, keeping him until 2021. In a follow up match against Lokeren on 17 February 2018, he scored again, in a 1–0 win. In the league's playoff final for the UEFA Europa League spot, Chevalier scored five goals, including a brace against Waasland-Beveren and OH Leuven. At the end of the 2017–18 season, Chevalier finished the season as the second top–scorer with twenty–one, just behind Zulte-Waregem's Hamdi Harbaoui with one goal.

=== Mouscron ===
On 31 August 2021, Chevalier moved to Mouscron in the Belgian First Division B on a two-year contract.

=== Francs Borains ===
On 12 August 2022, Belgian National Division 1 club Francs Borains announced the signing of Chevalier.

== Personal life ==
Chevalier said about his ambitions about soccer, saying: “'Soccer is my life. I believe in my qualities, but I realize that I will have to keep working hard to be able to develop my talents at the highest level. Hard work always pays off.”. Growing up in Denain, France, he supported RC Lens.

On 14 May 2010, Chevalier suffered second-degree burns on both of his legs after his car caught fire as he stepped in and tried to extinguish the fire. After being taken to the hospital, he was discharged from the hospital. A month later, Chevalier spoke about the incident. Chevalier was in Belgium the 2016 Brussels bombings occurred, and left the airport 15 minutes before the attack.

Chevalier has one child: a daughter (born in 2017).

== Career statistics ==
As of match played 22 May 2019

Club statistics
Club	Season	League			Cup		League Cup		Continental		Other		Total	
Club	Season	Division	Apps	Goals	Apps	Goals	Apps	Goals	Apps	Goals	Apps	Goals	Apps	Goals
Zulte Waregem	2009–10	Belgian Pro League	34	12	2	1	—						36	13
Zulte Waregem	2010–11	Belgian Pro League	30	4	1	0	—						31	4
Zulte Waregem	2011–12	Belgian Pro League	30	3	1	0	—						31	3
Zulte Waregem	Total		94	19	4	1	0	0	0	0	0	0	98	20
RKC Waalwijk	2012–13	Eredivisie	29	8	2	3	—						31	11
Kortrijk	2013–14	Belgian Pro League	22	6	2	0	—				2 (Note: Appearances in the 2014 Belgian Europa League play-offs)	1	26	7
Kortrijk	2014–15	Belgian Pro League	37	12	2	0	—						39	12
Kortrijk	Total		59	18	4	0	0	0	0	0	2	1	65	19
Çaykur Rizespor	2015–16	Süper Lig	23	1	7	3	—						30	4
Lens	2016–17	Ligue 2	2	0	0	0	1	0	—				3	0
Lens II	2016–17	CFA	4	3	—								4	3
Kortrijk	2016–17	Belgian First Division A	9	4	0	0	—						9	4
Kortrijk	2017–18	Belgian First Division A	40	21	4	0	—						44	21
Kortrijk	2018–19	Belgian First Division A	38	8	3	1	—				1 (Note: Appearance in the 2019 Belgian Europa League play-offs)	0	42	9
Kortrijk	Total		97	33	7	1	0	0	0	0	1	0	105	34
Career total			308	82	24	8	1	0	0	0	3	1	336	91
