= Lucas Rougeaux =

French footballer (born 1994)

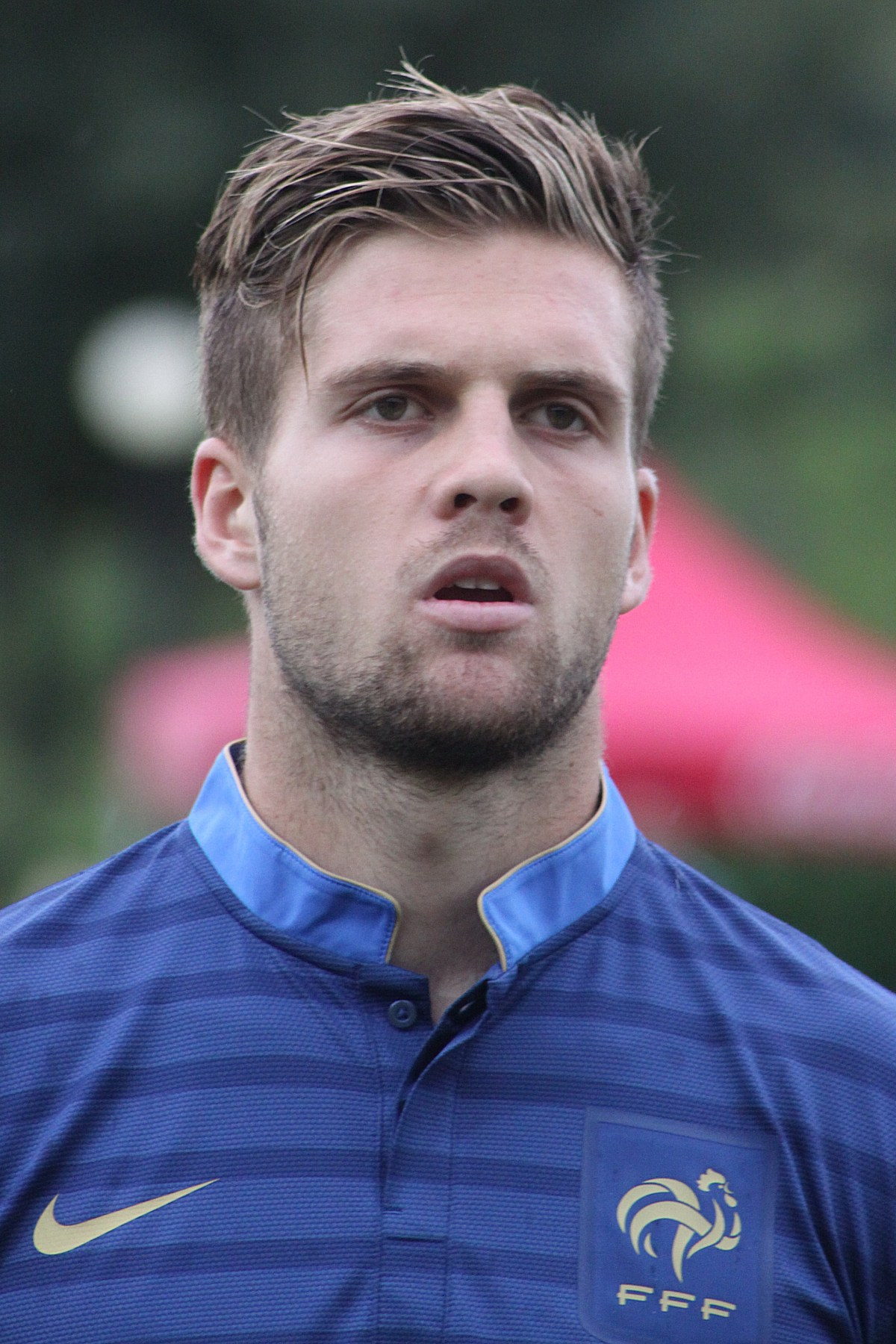
- Rougeaux playing for France U19

Personal information
- Date of birth: 10 March 1994 (age 32)
- Place of birth: Grasse, Alpes-Maritimes, France
- Height: 1.86 m (6 ft 1 in)
- Position: Centre-back

Youth career
- 2004–2008: Grasse
- 2008–2012: Nice

Senior career*
Years	Team	Apps	(Gls)
2012–2016	Nice	1	(0)
2014–2015	→ Fréjus St-Raphaël (loan)	23	(2)
2015–2016	→ Boulogne (loan)	12	(0)
2016–2022	KV Kortrijk	68	(1)

International career^{‡}
2012	France U18	2	(0)
2012–2013	France U19	11	(2)
2013	France U20	3	(0)
- * Club domestic league appearances and goals as of 10 April 2022 ‡ National team caps and goals as of 9 May 2014

Lucas Rougeaux (born 10 March 1994) is a French professional footballer who plays as a centre-back.

Rougeaux joined the OGC Nice academy in 2008 and made his Ligue 1 debut for the club as a late substitute in a 4–0 loss to Evian on 12 May 2013. He has represented France at under-18, under-19 and under-20 levels. He was a member of the under-19 squad that reached the final of the 2013 UEFA European Under-19 Championship.

Rougeaux joined third-level club Fréjus Saint-Raphaël on loan for the 2014–15 season.

== Career statistics ==
As of 10 June 2016

Appearances and goals by club, season and competition
Club	Season	League			National cup (Note: Includes Coupe de France.)		League cup (Note: Includes Coupe de la Ligue.)		Total	
Club	Season	Division	Apps	Goals	Apps	Goals	Apps	Goals	Apps	Goals
Nice	2012–13	Ligue 1	1	0	0	0	0	0	1	0
Fréjus Saint-Raphaël (loan)	2014–15	National	23	2	2	0	0	0	25	2
Boulogne (loan)	2015–16	National	12	0	3	0	0	0	15	0
Career total			36	2	5	0	0	0	41	2
