= Habib Guèye =

French footballer (born 1999)

Personal information
- Date of birth: 8 March 1999 (age 27)
- Place of birth: Meaux, France
- Height: 1.88 m (6 ft 2 in)
- Position: Forward

Team information
- Current team: Sarre-Union

Youth career
- Reims
- 2014–2017: Bastia
- 2017–2018: Vitesse

Senior career*
Years	Team	Apps	(Gls)
2017	Bastia II	1	(0)
2018–2019	Niort II	18	(0)
2018–2019	Niort	6	(0)
2019–2020	Bastia-Borgo	11	(0)
2020–2021	Hyères	3	(0)
2021–2023	Saint-Priest	15	(0)
2023–2024	Reims Sainte-Anne	16	(0)
2024–	Sarre-Union	7	(0)
- * Club domestic league appearances and goals as of 7 December 2024

Habib Guèye (born 8 March 1999) is a French professional footballer who plays for Championnat National 3 club Sarre-Union as a centre-back.

== Club career ==
Guèye was part of the Bastia youth academy, and joined Niort in 2018. He made his professional debut with Niort in a 1–0 Ligue 2 win over Paris FC on 5 October 2018.

== International career ==
Born in France, Guèye is of Senegalese descent.
