= Zinho Gano =

Bissau-Guinean footballer

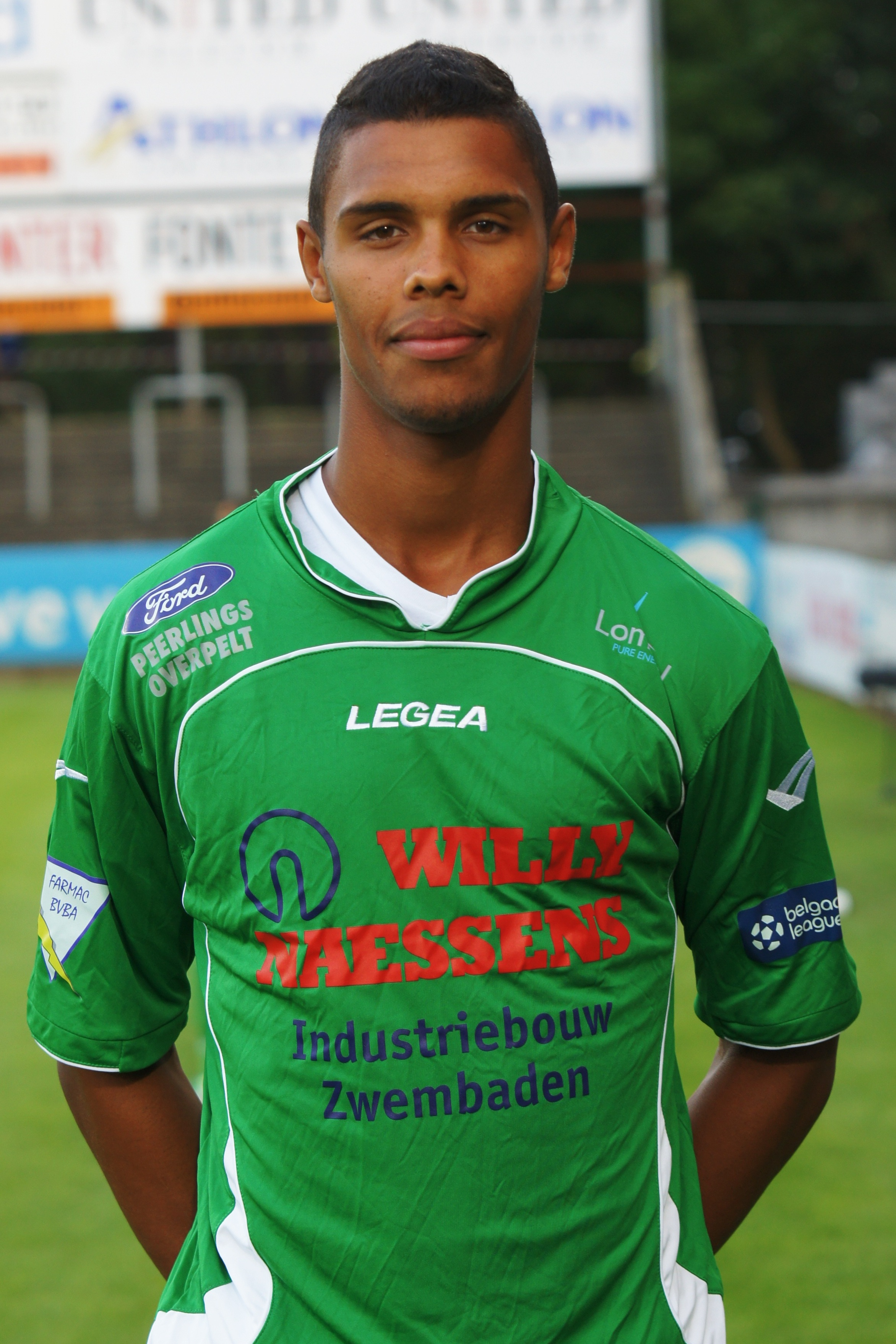
- Gano as a SV Zulte Waregem player in 2021

Personal information
- Date of birth: 13 October 1993 (age 33)
- Place of birth: Sint-Katelijne-Waver, Belgium
- Height: 1.98 m (6 ft 6 in)
- Position: Forward

Youth career
- Club Brugge

Senior career*
Years	Team	Apps	(Gls)
2013–2015	Club Brugge	0	(0)
2013–2014	→ Lommel United (loan)	22	(6)
2014–2015	→ Mouscron-Péruwelz (loan)	17	(5)
2015–2017	Waasland-Beveren	73	(25)
2017–2018	Oostende	31	(8)
2018–2021	Genk	21	(1)
2019–2020	→ Antwerp (loan)	11	(2)
2021	→ Kortrijk (loan)	11	(6)
2021–2024	Zulte Waregem	67	(33)
2024–2025	Al-Hazem	15	(16)
2025–2026	Al-Raed	29	(24)

International career^{‡}
2011	Belgium U18	2	(1)
2011–2012	Belgium U19	11	(1)
2022–2024	Guinea-Bissau	7	(4)
- * Club domestic league appearances and goals as of 7 March 2026 ‡ National team caps and goals as of 22 January 2024

Zinho Gano (born 13 October 1993) is a professional footballer who plays as a forward for Al-Raed. Born in Belgium, he plays for the Guinea-Bissau national team.

== Early life ==
Gano was born in Sint-Katelijne-Waver, Belgium to a Bissau-Guinean father and a Belgian Flemish mother.

== Club career ==
Gano is a youth exponent from Brugge. During the 2013–14 season, he scored six goals out of 22 league games with Belgian Second Division side Lommel United, on loan from Brugge. Then he played on loan for Mouscron in the Belgian Pro League. He made his top division debut at 27 July 2014 against Anderlecht. On 2 July 2018 he joined Genk from fellow Pro League side Oostende for a value of £1.62 million.

On 2 September 2019, he joined Antwerp on a season-long loan with an option to buy.

On 5 September 2025, Gano joined Al-Raed.

== International career ==
Gano made his senior debut for Guinea-Bissau on 23 March 2022, starting in a 3–0 friendly win over Equatorial Guinea.

In December 2023, he was selected from the list of 25 Bissao-Guinean players selected by Baciro Candé to compete in the 2023 Africa Cup of Nations.

== Honours ==
Genk

- Belgian First Division A: 2018–19
