= Ilombe Mboyo =

Belgian footballer (born 1987)

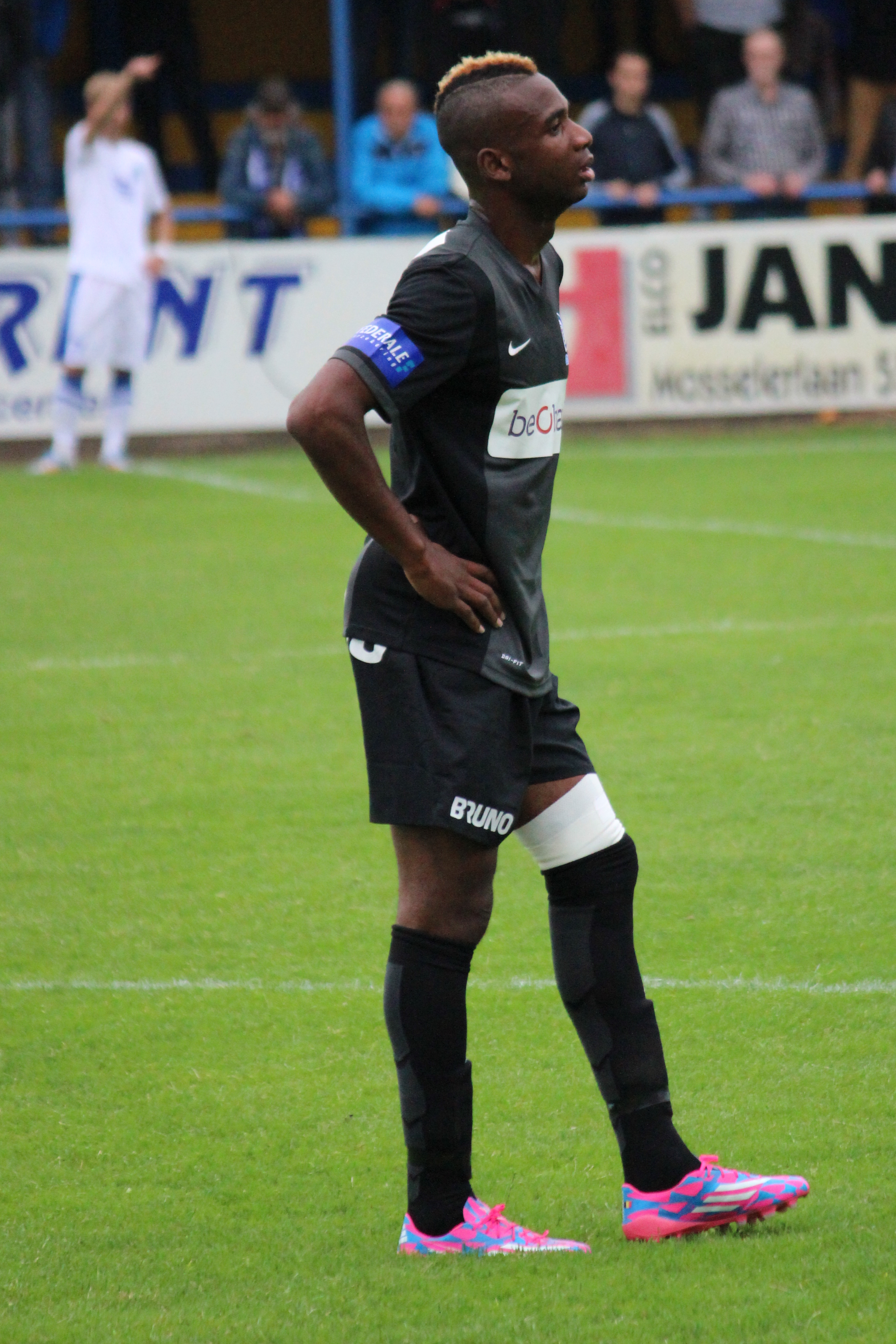
- Mboyo with Genk in 2014

Personal information
- Date of birth: 22 April 1987 (age 39)
- Place of birth: Kinshasa, DR Congo (then Zaire)
- Height: 1.90 m (6 ft 3 in)
- Position: Striker

Team information
- Current team: Virton
- Number: 19

Youth career
- 1997–2001: Anderlecht
- 2001–2002: Eendracht Aalst
- 2002–2005: Club Brugge
- 2005–2008: Charleroi

Senior career*
Years	Team	Apps	(Gls)
2008–2010	Charleroi	40	(3)
2010–2011	Kortrijk	21	(6)
2011–2013	Gent	80	(37)
2013–2015	Genk	43	(13)
2015–2018	Sion	24	(4)
2017–2018	→ Cercle Brugge (loan)	10	(4)
2018–2021	Kortrijk	66	(23)
2019	→ Al-Raed (loan)	13	(2)
2021	Sint-Truiden	21	(5)
2021–2022	Gent	8	(1)
2022	URSL Visé	8	(3)
2023–	Virton	13	(3)

International career
2011	DR Congo	1	(0)
2012	Belgium	2	(0)
- * Club domestic league appearances and goals as of 15 June 2023

Ilombe Mboyo (born 22 April 1987) is a professional footballer who plays as a striker for Virton. Born in Zaire and raised in Belgium, Mboyo originally represented DR Congo internationally before switching to represent the Belgium national team.

== Club career ==
Born in Kinshasa, Democratic Republic of the Congo, Mboyo moved to Belgium during his childhood. He began his youth football career at Zellik Sport before joining Anderlecht, Eendracht Aalst and Club Brugge.

In 2005, at the age of 17, Mboyo was convicted of offences committed in 2004 and sentenced to seven years' imprisonment, three of which were suspended.

During his imprisonment, he participated in "Foot en Prison", a football rehabilitation programme, where his talent was recognised by Pierre Bodenghien, who was also a scout for Sporting Charleroi. Following his conditional release in 2009, Mboyo resumed his football career, making his professional debut with Sporting Charleroi before going on to play for several Belgian and international clubs. In 2012, he was selected to represent the Belgian national team. He joined Kortrijk on loan in May 2010; the deal was made permanent in September 2010 He moved to Gent in January 2011.

He quickly became an important player for Gent and received the captain's armband. However, two months later, in a game against Waasland-Beveren, Mboyo missed a carelessly taken penalty and provoked his own supporters after being booed. The club forced him to apologize for his behaviour and youngster Hannes van der Bruggen became the new captain.

On 3 February 2019, Al-Raed signed Mboyo for one season from Kortrijk.

In January 2021, Mboyo joined fellow Belgian First Division A side Sint-Truiden on a permanent deal.

On 31 August 2021, he returned to Gent on a two-year contract.

On 26 December 2022, Mboyo signed with Virton.

== International career ==
In August 2011 Mboyo played for the DR Congo national team in the 3–0 defeat against Gambia. However, as this was a friendly game, he remained eligible for Belgium. In October 2012, Mboyo was called up to the senior Belgium national team. Due to his conviction, the selection was controversial. Assistant manager Vital Borkelmans said that he deserved a second chance, while François De Keersmaecker, President of the Royal Belgian Football Association, said that his presence could set a good example. He made his debut on the 16th in a 2–0 win over Scotland in 2014 FIFA World Cup qualification, replacing Christian Benteke for the final four minutes at the King Baudouin Stadium in Brussels.

== Career statistics ==
As of match played 16 May 2019

Appearances and goals by club, season and competition
Club	Season	League			Cup		Other		Total	
Club	Season	Division	Apps	Goals	Apps	Goals	Apps	Goals	Apps	Goals
Sporting Charleroi	2008–09	Belgian First Division	15	3	0	0	0	0	15	3
Sporting Charleroi	2009–10	Belgian Pro League	25	0	1	0	0	0	26	0
Sporting Charleroi	Total		40	3	1	0	0	0	41	3
Kortrijk	2010–11	Belgian Pro League	21	6	2	0	0	0	23	6
Gent	2010–11	Belgian Pro League	12	2	1	1	0	0	13	3
Gent	2011–12	Belgian Pro League	32	14	3	0	0	0	35	14
Gent	2012–13	Belgian Pro League	34	20	3	1	0	0	37	21
Gent	2013–14	Belgian Pro League	2	1	0	0	0	0	2	1
Gent	Total		80	37	7	2	0	0	87	39
Genk	2013–14	Belgian Pro League	24	5	1	0	4 (Note: Appearances in UEFA Europa League)	0	29	5
Genk	2014–15	Belgian Pro League	19	8	1	0	0	0	20	8
Genk	Total		43	13	2	0	0	0	45	13
Sion	2017–18	Swiss Super League	24	4	1	1	0	0	25	5
Cercle Brugge (loan)	2016–17	Belgian First Division A	10	4	0	0	0	0	10	4
Kortrijk	2018–19	Belgian First Division A	20	7	2	0	0	0	22	7
Al-Raed (loan)	2018–19	Saudi Professional League	13	2	0	0	0	0	13	2
Career total			251	76	15	3	4	0	270	79
