= Michiel Jonckheere =

Belgian footballer

Personal information
- Date of birth: 3 January 1990 (age 36)
- Place of birth: Ostend, Belgium
- Height: 1.80 m (5 ft 11 in)
- Position: Midfielder

Youth career
- 1996–1998: KRC De Panne
- 1998–2010: Club Brugge
- 2010–2011: Zulte Waregem

Senior career*
Years	Team	Apps	(Gls)
2010–2011	Zulte Waregem	0	(0)
2011–2020	Oostende	105	(11)
2020–2022	Kortrijk	38	(2)
2022–2023	KSV Bredene		

International career
2005	Belgium U15	2	(0)
2005	Belgium U16	3	(0)
2005	Belgium U18	2	(0)

Managerial career
- 2022–2023: Oostende (U18)
- 2023–2024: Oostende (assistant)
- 2023–2024: Oostende (caretaker)
- 2024: Club Brugge (U18)
- 2024–2025: Club Brugge (assistant)
- 2025–2026: Kortrijk
- * Club domestic league appearances and goals

Michiel Jonckheere (born 3 January 1990) is a Belgian football coach and a former player. He is currently unemployed after resigning from Belgian Pro League club Kortrijk.
