= 2016–17 SV Zulte Waregem season =

S.V. Zulte Waregem
2016–17 season
- Chairman: Willy Naessens
- Manager: Francky Dury
- Stadium: Regenboogstadion
- Belgian First Division A: 6th
- Belgian Cup: Winners
Home colours	Away colours	Third colours

The 2016–17 season was the 16th season in the existence of S.V. Zulte Waregem and the club's 12th consecutive season in the top flight of Belgian football. In addition to the domestic league, S.V. Zulte Waregem participated in this season's edition of the Belgian Cup.

== Players ==
=== First-team squad ===
Note: Flags indicate national team as defined under FIFA eligibility rules; some limited exceptions apply. Players may hold more than one non-FIFA nationality.

No.	Pos.	Nation	Player
1	GK	BEL	Sammy Bossut
2	DF	BEL	Davy De fauw
3	DF	CGO	Marvin Baudry
4	DF	ITA	Luca Marrone (on loan from Juventus)
5	DF	FRA	Yoan Severin
6	DF	BEL	Timothy Derijck
7	FW	NGR	Aliko Bala
8	MF	DEN	Lukas Lerager
9	FW	SEN	Mbaye Leye (captain)
10	MF	BEL	Onur Kaya
11	FW	BEL	Jens Naessens (on loan from Mechelen)
14	DF	DEN	Henrik Dalsgaard
15	DF	NGR	Kingsley Madu

No.	Pos.	Nation	Player
17	MF	FRA	Souahilo Meïté (on loan from Lille)
19	FW	SEN	Babacar Guèye (on loan from Hannover 96)
22	GK	BEL	Kenny Steppe
23	MF	BEL	Christophe Lepoint
25	GK	BEL	Louis Bostyn
29	MF	BEL	Alessandro Cordaro
30	MF	DEN	Jakob Ankersen
31	DF	DEN	Brian Hämäläinen
43	MF	BEL	Sander Coopman (on loan from Brugge)
44	DF	BEL	Azzedine Zaidi
45	DF	BEL	Pieter De Smet
—	FW	NED	Robert Mühren

=== On loan ===
Note: Flags indicate national team as defined under FIFA eligibility rules; some limited exceptions apply. Players may hold more than one non-FIFA nationality.

No.	Pos.	Nation	Player
—	DF	BEL	Charni Ekangamene (at NAC Breda until 30 June 2017)
—	DF	BEL	Bryan Verboom (at Roda JC Kerkrade until 30 June 2017)

== Pre-season and friendlies ==
Win Draw Loss

== Competitions ==
=== Overall record ===
Competition	First match	Last match	Starting round	Final position	Record							
Competition	First match	Last match	Starting round	Final position	Pld	W	D	L	GF	GA	GD	Win %
First Division A	30 July 2016	21 May 2017	Matchday 1	6th	40	16	12	12	61	59	+2	40.00
Belgian Cup	21 September 2016	18 March 2017	Sixth round	Winners	6	5	1	0	12	5	+7	83.33
Total					46	21	13	12	73	64	+9	45.65

Source: Soccerway

=== First Division A ===
==== Regular season ====
Pos	Team	Pld	W	D	L	GF	GA	GD	Pts	Qualification or relegation
1	Anderlecht	30	18	7	5	67	30	+37	61	Qualification for the championship play-offs
2	Club Brugge	30	18	5	7	56	24	+32	59	Qualification for the championship play-offs
3	Zulte Waregem	30	15	9	6	49	38	+11	54	Qualification for the championship play-offs
4	Gent	30	14	8	8	45	29	+16	50	Qualification for the championship play-offs
5	Oostende	30	14	8	8	52	37	+15	50	Qualification for the championship play-offs

Source: Belgian First Division A (in Dutch), Soccerway
Rules for classification: 1) Points; 2) Matches won; 3) Goal difference; 4) Goals scored; 5) Away goals scored; 6) Away matches won; 7) Play-off.

==== Results summary ====
Overall								Home						Away					
Pld	W	D	L	GF	GA	GD	Pts	W	D	L	GF	GA	GD	W	D	L	GF	GA	GD
0	0	0	0	0	0	0	0	0	0	0	0	0	0	0	0	0	0	0	0

==== Results by round ====
Round	1	2	3	4	5	6	7	8	9	10	11	12	13	14	15	16	17	18	19	20	21	22	23	24	25	26	27	28	29	30
Ground	H	A	H	H	A	A	H	A	H	A	H	A	H	A	H	A	H	A	A	H	H	A	H	A	H	A	H	A	H	A
Result	W	W	W	D	L	W	W	W	D	L	W	W	D	W	W	L	D	D	D	W	D	W	W	L	D	L	W	L	D	W
Position																														

A = Away; H = Home; W = Win; D = Draw; L = Loss

==== Matches ====
30 July 2016 1	Zulte Waregem	3–0	Eupen	Waregem
CEST (UTC+2)				Stadium: Regenboogstadion

6 August 2016 2	Waasland-Beveren	0–2	Zulte Waregem	Beveren
CEST (UTC+2)

14 August 2016 3	Zulte Waregem	1–0	Standard Liège	Waregem
CEST (UTC+2)				Stadium: Regenboogstadion

20 August 2016 4	Zulte Waregem	1–1	Oostende	Waregem
CEST (UTC+2)				Stadium: Regenboogstadion

28 August 2016 5	Genk	1–0	Zulte Waregem	Genk
CEST (UTC+2)				Stadium: Cristal Arena

10 September 2016 6	Excel Mouscron	1–5	Zulte Waregem	Mouscron
CEST (UTC+2)				Stadium: Stade Le Canonnier

17 September 2016 7	Zulte Waregem	2–1	Kortrijk	Waregem
CEST (UTC+2)				Stadium: Regenboogstadion

24 September 2016 8	Mechelen	2–3	Zulte Waregem	Mechelen
CEST (UTC+2)				Stadium: AFAS-stadion Achter de Kazerne

1 October 2016 9	Zulte Waregem	1–1	Charleroi	Waregem
CEST (UTC+2)				Stadium: Regenboogstadion

16 October 2016 10	Gent	3–0	Zulte Waregem	Ghent
CEST (UTC+2)				Stadium: Ghelamco Arena

22 October 2016 11	Zulte Waregem	2–0	Lokeren	Waregem
CEST (UTC+2)				Stadium: Regenboogstadion

26 October 2016 12	Sint-Truiden	0–2	Zulte Waregem	Sint-Truiden
CEST (UTC+2)				Stadium: Stayen

29 October 2016 13	Zulte Waregem	0–0	Club Brugge	Waregem
CEST (UTC+2)				Stadium: Regenboogstadion

5 November 2016 14	Westerlo	1–2	Zulte Waregem	Westerlo
CET (UTC+1)				Stadium: Het Kuipje

20 November 2016 15	Zulte Waregem	3–2	Anderlecht	Waregem
CET (UTC+1)				Stadium: Regenboogstadion

27 November 2016 16	Standard Liège	4–1	Zulte Waregem	Liège
CET (UTC+1)				Stadium: Stade Maurice Dufrasne

3 December 2016 17	Zulte Waregem	1–1	Waasland-Beveren	Waregem
CET (UTC+1)				Stadium: Regenboogstadion

9 December 2016 18	Lokeren	1–1	Zulte Waregem	Lokeren
CET (UTC+1)				Stadium: Daknamstadion

17 December 2016 19	Oostende	1–1	Zulte Waregem	Ostend
CET (UTC+1)				Stadium: Versluys Arena

21 December 2016 20	Zulte Waregem	1–0	Genk	Waregem
CET (UTC+1)				Stadium: Regenboogstadion

26 December 2016 21	Zulte Waregem	0–0	Mechelen	Waregem
CET (UTC+1)				Stadium: Regenboogstadion

21 January 2017 22	Kortrijk	2–3	Zulte Waregem	Kortrijk
CET (UTC+1)				Stadium: Guldensporen Stadion

24 January 2017 23	Zulte Waregem	1–0	Excel Mouscron	Waregem
CET (UTC+1)				Stadium: Regenboogstadion

27 January 2017 24	Charleroi	2–1	Zulte Waregem	Charleroi
CET (UTC+1)				Stadium: Stade du Pays de Charleroi

5 February 2017 25	Zulte Waregem	1–1	Gent	Waregem
CET (UTC+1)				Stadium: Regenboogstadion

12 February 2017 26	Anderlecht	4–2	Zulte Waregem	Anderlecht
CET (UTC+1)				Stadium: Constant Vanden Stock Stadium

18 February 2017 27	Zulte Waregem	4–1	Sint-Truiden	Waregem
CET (UTC+1)				Stadium: Regenboogstadion

24 February 2017 28	Club Brugge	5–0	Zulte Waregem	Bruges
CET (UTC+1)				Stadium: Jan Breydel Stadium

4 March 2017 29	Zulte Waregem	2–2	Westerlo	Waregem
20:00 CET (UTC+1)				Stadium: Regenboogstadion

12 March 2017 30	Eupen	1–3	Zulte Waregem	Eupen
14:30 CET (UTC+1)				Stadium: Kehrweg Stadion

==== Championship play-offs ====
Pos	Team	Pld	W	D	L	GF	GA	GD	Pts	Qualification	AND	CLU	GNT	OOS	CHA	ZWA
1	Anderlecht (C)	10	6	3	1	14	6	+8	52	Qualification for the Champions League group stage	—	2–0	0–0	3–2	0–1	2–0
2	Club Brugge	10	4	3	3	16	14	+2	45	Qualification for the Champions League third qualifying round	1–1	—	2–1	3–1	1–1	2–1
3	Gent	10	4	4	2	16	11	+5	41	Qualification for the Europa League third qualifying round	0–0	2–1	—	1–1	1–1	5–2
4	Oostende (O)	10	3	3	4	14	17	−3	37	Qualification for the Europa League play-off final	0–1	2–1	4–3	—	1–0	1–1
5	Charleroi	10	2	4	4	10	13	−3	35		1–3	1–3	0–1	1–1	—	2–0
6	Zulte Waregem	10	1	3	6	12	21	−9	33	Qualification for the Europa League group stage (Note: Zulte Waregem qualified for the Europa League group stage by winning the 2016–17 Belgian Cup.)	1–2	2–2	0–2	3–1	2–2	—

Source: Soccerway
Rules for classification: 1) Points; 2) Points without (possible) half points added due to rounding; 3) Matches won; 4) Goal difference; 5) Goals scored; 6) Away goals scored; 7) Away matches won; 8) Play-off.
(C) Champions; (O) Play-off winners

==== Results summary ====
Overall								Home						Away					
Pld	W	D	L	GF	GA	GD	Pts	W	D	L	GF	GA	GD	W	D	L	GF	GA	GD
0	0	0	0	0	0	0	0	0	0	0	0	0	0	0	0	0	0	0	0

==== Results by round ====
Round	1	2	3	4	5	6	7	8	9	10
Ground	H	A	H	A	H	A	A	H	A	H
Result	L	D	D	L	L	L	L	W	L	D
Position										

A = Away; H = Home; W = Win; D = Draw; L = Loss

==== Matches ====
31 March 2017 1	Zulte Waregem	1–2	Anderlecht	Waregem
20:30 CEST (UTC+2)				Stadium: Regenboogstadion

7 April 2017 2	Oostende	1–1	Zulte Waregem	Ostend
CEST (UTC+2)				Stadium: Versluys Arena

17 April 2017 3	Zulte Waregem	2–2	Club Brugge	Waregem
CEST (UTC+2)				Stadium: Regenboogstadion

22 April 2017 4	Charleroi	2–0	Zulte Waregem	Charleroi
CEST (UTC+2)				Stadium: Stade du Pays de Charleroi

25 April 2017 5	Zulte Waregem	0–2	Gent	Waregem
CEST (UTC+2)				Stadium: Regenboogstadion

1 May 2017 6	Club Brugge	2–1	Zulte Waregem	Bruges
CEST (UTC+2)				Stadium: Jan Breydel Stadium

7 May 2017 7	Anderlecht	2–0	Zulte Waregem	Anderlecht
CEST (UTC+2)				Stadium: Constant Vanden Stock Stadium

13 May 2017 8	Zulte Waregem	3–1	Oostende	Waregem
CEST (UTC+2)				Stadium: Regenboogstadion

18 May 2017 9	Gent	5–2	Zulte Waregem	Ghent
CEST (UTC+2)				Stadium: Ghelamco Arena

21 May 2017 10	Zulte Waregem	2–2	Charleroi	Waregem
CEST (UTC+2)				Stadium: Regenboogstadion

=== Belgian Cup ===
21 September 2016 Sixth round	Cappellen	1–2	Zulte Waregem	Kapellen
20:30 CEST (UTC+2)	Van den Heuvel 76'		Vetokele 39'; Leye 89'	Stadium: Stadion Jos Van Wellen

30 November 2016 Seventh round	ASV Geel	1–2 (a.e.t.)	Zulte Waregem	Geel
20:30 CET (UTC+1)	Bangoura 9'		Derijck 36' (pen.); Meïté 114'	Stadium: De Leunen; Referee: Joeri Van de Velde

14 December 2016 Quarter-finals	Zulte Waregem	2–0	Sint-Truiden	Waregem
20:00 CET (UTC+1)	Leye 23'; Madu 90+1'			Stadium: Regenboogstadion; Referee: Alexandre Boucaut

18 January 2017 Semi-finals; First leg	Zulte Waregem	1–0	Eupen	Waregem
20:45 CET (UTC+1)	Coopman 87'			Stadium: Regenboogstadion; Referee: Nicolas Laforge

1 February 2017 Semi-finals; Second leg	Eupen	0–2 (0–3 agg.)	Zulte Waregem	Eupen
20:30 CET (UTC+1)			Hämäläinen 78'; Marrone 90'	Stadium: Kehrwegstadion; Referee: Serge Gumienny

18 March 2017 Final	Oostende	3–3 (a.e.t.) (2–4 p)	Zulte Waregem	Brussels
20:45 CET (UTC+1)	Dimata 19', 54'; Musona 116' (pen.)		Derijck 25'; Coopman 64'; Guèye 111'	Stadium: King Baudouin Stadium; Attendance: 35,000; Referee: Sébastien Delferière
	Penalties
	Siani (penalty scored); Canesin (penalty missed); Marušić (penalty scored); Musona (penalty missed)		(penalty scored) Derijck; (penalty scored) Mühren; (penalty scored) Meïté; (penalty scored) Hämäläinen
