= 2017 Belgian Cup final =

- Event: 2016–17 Belgian Cup
| Oostende | Zulte Waregem |
| 3 | 3 |
- After extra time Zulte Waregem won 4–2 on penalties
- Date: 18 March 2017
- Venue: King Baudouin Stadium, Brussels
- Man of the Match: Sammy Bossut
- Referee: Sébastien Delferière
- Attendance: 35,000

The 2017 Belgian Cup final, named Croky Cup after the sponsor, was the 62nd Belgian Cup final and took place on 18 March 2017 between Oostende and Zulte Waregem. Oostende qualified for the final for the first time in its history, while Zulte Waregem already played two finals, winning against Mouscron in 2006 but losing against Lokeren in 2014. In a spectacular match, Oostende twice took the lead but Zulte Waregem returned to force 2–2 after 90 minutes. During the extra-time, both teams scored once more. Zulte Waregem finally won 4–2 on penalties and thereby qualified for the 2017–18 UEFA Europa League Group stage.

== Route to the final ==
| Oostende | | | | | Zulte Waregem |
|---|---|---|---|---|---|---|---|---|
| Opponent | Result | Legs | Scorers | Round | Opponent | Result | Legs | Scorers |
| Antwerp (II) | 2–0 | 2–0 away | Berrier, Musona | Sixth round | Capellen (IV) | 2–1 | 2–1 away | Vetokele, Leye |
| Tubize (II) | 4–3 (a.e.t.) | 4–3 away | Cyriac (2), Pedersen, Siani (pen.) | Seventh round | ASV Geel (III) | 2–1 (a.e.t.) | 2–1 away | Derijck (pen.), Meïté |
| Gent | 1–0 | 1–0 home | Cyriac | Quarter-finals | Sint-Truiden | 2–0 | 2–0 home | Leye, Madu |
| Genk | 2–1 | 1–1 home; 1–0 away | Vandendriessche; Musona | Semi-finals | Eupen | 3–0 | 1–0 home; 2–0 away | Coopman; Hämäläinen, Marrone |

== Match ==
=== Summary ===
Harsh fouls by Michiel Jonckheere and Timothy Derijck in the opening minutes set the tone, with neither team intending to give away any opportunities. After the initial ten minutes, Oostende started to take the initiative, with Franck Berrier missing the target on a cross from Brecht Capon and Knowledge Musona nearly taking advantage of a mistake by Sammy Bossut. With nearly twenty minutes played, Marvin Baudry slipped, allowing Landry Dimata to run away with the ball and shoot it into the far corner to open the scoring for Oostende.

Zulte Waregem quickly responded as William Dutoit could only deflect a free-kick by Brian Hämäläinen against the post, which gave Derijck an easy tap in to score the equaliser. Oostende responded immediately, with Musona hitting the cross bar from 20 meters. The game was now flowing up and down with many chances on both sides of the pitch. Before half time spectators witnessed a header by Dimata, a save by Dutoit on another Hämäläinen free-kick and a shot from Musona, but the score remained 1–1 going into the break.

The second half started immediately where the first half had left off. Henrik Dalsgaard missed a header for Zulte Waregem, but following an attacking combination, Dimata scored his second of the night, back-heeling the cross from Adam Marušić into the net to give Oostende the lead again with 54 minutes played. Oostende pushed and when Franck Berrier and Musona ripped open the Zulte Waregem defence it looked like Oostende was going to score again soon. Zulte Waregem manager Francky Dury brought in Coopman and Guèye to turn the tide and when Marušić' header back to Dutoit fell short, Coopman exploited the mistake to score the equalizer a few minutes past the hour mark.

Even at 2–2 both teams kept attacking, with first Onur Kaya missing a huge opportunity for Zulte Wargem followed by Sammy Bossut having to throw himself in the line of fire three times to deny Oostende a third goal. In the added time, both teams had an excellent opportunity to score the winning goal, as both Dimata and Mbaye Leye failed to score from a header.

During the first half of extra-time, both teams seemed to have used up most of their energy, with some players suffering cramps and others barely able to run. Out of the blue, Guèye headed in a free-kick in the second half of extra-time with less than ten minutes to play, forcing Oostende to hunt for the late equalizer but failing to create big chances until Dalsgaard touched the ball with his hand in the penalty area, forcing referee Sébastien Delferière to award a penalty to Oostende, which Musona converted to set the final score to 3–3.

During the penalty shoot-out, Sammy Bossut saved the penalty kicks from both Fernando Canesin and Musona, allowing Hämäläinen to score the winning goal, thereby handing Zulte Waregem their second cup victory.

=== Details ===
18 March 2017
20:45

| Oostende | 3–3 (a.e.t.) | Zulte Waregem |
|---|---|---|
| Dimata 19', 54'; Musona 116' (pen.) | report | Derijck 25'; Coopman 64'; Guèye 111' |
Penalties
| Siani (penalty scored); Canesin (penalty missed); Marušić (penalty scored); Musona (penalty missed) | 2–4 | (penalty scored) Derijck; (penalty scored) Mühren; (penalty scored) Meïté; (penalty scored) Hämäläinen |

King Baudouin Stadium, Brussels
Attendance: 35,000
Referee: Sébastien Delferière

| Oostende | Zulte Waregem |

| GK | 28 | (France) William Dutoit |
| RB | 27 | (Belgium) Brecht Capon |
| CB | 18 | (Czech Republic) David Rozehnal |
| CB | 31 | (Belgium) Bruno Godeau |
| LB | 77 | (Montenegro) Adam Marušić |
| MF | 7 | (Cameroon) Sébastien Siani |
| MF | 20 | (Belgium) Michiel Jonckheere | (yellow card) 1' | (substituted off) 71' |
| MF | 10 | (France) Franck Berrier | | (substituted off) 87' |
| RW | 26 | (France) Kévin Vandendriessche |
| CF | 19 | (Belgium) Landry Dimata | | (substituted off) 97' |
| LW | 11 | (Zimbabwe) Knowledge Musona | (yellow card) 120' |
Substitutes:
| GK | 1 | (Belgium) Silvio Proto |
| DF | 4 | (France) Fabien Antunes |
| DF | 6 | (Belgium) Mathias Bossaerts |
| FW | 8 | (Belgium) Yassine El Ghanassy | | (substituted on) 87' |
| MF | 15 | (South Africa) Andile Jali |
| FW | 17 | (Nigeria) Joseph Akpala | | (substituted on) 97' |
| FW | 55 | (Brazil) Fernando Canesin | | (substituted on) 71' |
Manager:
(Belgium) Yves Vanderhaeghe

| GK | 1 | (Belgium) Sammy Bossut |
| RW | 14 | (Denmark) Henrik Dalsgaard |
| CB | 6 | (Belgium) Timothy Derijck | (yellow card) 11' |
| CB | 3 | (Republic of the Congo) Marvin Baudry |
| LB | 31 | (Denmark) Brian Hämäläinen |
| CM | 8 | (Denmark) Lukas Lerager |
| CM | 23 | (Belgium) Christophe Lepoint | | (substituted off) 57' |
| CM | 17 | (France) Soualiho Meïté |
| RW | 29 | (Belgium) Alessandro Cordaro | | (substituted off) 57' |
| CF | 9 | (Senegal) Mbaye Leye |
| LW | 10 | (Belgium) Onur Kaya | | (substituted off) 83' |
Substitutes:
| DF | 4 | (Italy) Luca Marrone |
| FW | 7 | (Nigeria) Aliko Bala |
| DF | 15 | (Nigeria) Kingsley Madu |
| FW | 19 | (Senegal) Babacar Guèye | | (substituted on) 57' |
| FW | 21 | (Netherlands) Robert Mühren | (yellow card) 112' | (substituted on) 83' |
| GK | 22 | (Belgium) Kenny Steppe |
| MF | 43 | (Belgium) Sander Coopman | | (substituted on) 57' |
Manager:
(Belgium) Francky Dury

Match rules

- 90 minutes.
- 30 minutes of extra time if necessary.
- Penalty shoot-out if scores still level.
- Seven named substitutes.
- Maximum of three substitutions.
