= Chris O'Loughlin =

Chris O'Loughlin may refer to:

- Chris O'Loughlin (fencer) (born 1967), American fencer
- Chris O'Loughlin (football coach) (born 1978), association football coach from the Republic of Ireland
