= 2015–16 Belgian Pro League =

113th season of top-tier football in Belgium

Jupiler Pro League
- Season: 2015–16
- Dates: 24 July 2015 – 22 May 2016
- Champions: Club Brugge
- Relegated: OH Leuven
- Champions League: Club Brugge; Anderlecht
- Europa League: Standard Liège; Gent; Genk
- Matches: 184
- Goals: 517 (2.81 per match)
- Top goalscorer: Jérémy Perbet (22 goals)
- Biggest home win: Club Brugge 7–1 Standard Liège
- Biggest away win: Waasland-Beveren 1–5 Oostende; Zulte-Waregem 0–4 Anderlecht
- Highest scoring: Club Brugge 7–1 Standard Liège
- Longest winning run: 7 games Club Brugge
- Longest unbeaten run: 14 games K.A.A. Gent
- Longest winless run: 8 games Standard Liège and Westerlo
- Longest losing run: 6 games OH Leuven

The 2015–16 season of the Belgian Pro League (also known as Jupiler Pro League for sponsorship reasons) was the 113th season of top-tier football in Belgium. It started in the last week of July 2015 and finished in May 2016. Gent were the defending champions.

This marked the final season under the "Pro League" name, until the name was restored in 2022. A reorganization of the Belgian professional leagues ensued after the season, leading to the top league being renamed "First Division A" from the 2016–17 season.

== Changes from 2014–15 ==
=== Structural changes ===
Some changes have been introduced compared to the previous season, with the most significant one being the relegation rules. Instead of organizing a relegation playoff between the teams finishing in the two last positions, this season will see the last team relegated immediately, while the team placed 15th will not participate in any playoff and will remain in the renamed Belgian First Division A.

Several other smaller changes were introduced, namely:

- The team finishing on top of the table following the regular season, will be assured at least place in the 2016–17 UEFA Europa League in case they drop out of the top two positions and thereby miss out on the 2016–17 UEFA Champions League. They will be awarded a spot in the 2016–17 UEFA Europa League Third qualifying round, or even the Group stage in case the 2015–16 Belgian Cup winners finish in the top two.
- In case two or more teams finish with equal points after the Championship Playoff, the first tiebreaker will now be the finishing position during the regular season.
- The disciplinary record (number of yellow cards) will now be erased for all players after conclusion of the regular season. Any suspensions already obtained will be kept. In addition, during the playoffs, players will now pick up a one match ban already after three yellow cards, rather than five as during the regular season.

The first two of these rules were implemented as compensation for the rule that halves the points obtained during the regular season prior to the start of the championship playoff. This rule had been subject to complaints from several teams that had been leading after the regular season in recent seasons. The third rule was introduced to prevent players from intentionally receiving yellow cards near the end of the regular season. This tactic aimed to ensure they would be suspended before the playoffs, particularly against weaker teams, allowing them to start the deciding playoffs with a clean disciplinary record.

=== Team changes ===
- Cercle Brugge and Lierse were relegated. Cercle Brugge after losing the relegation playoff series against Lierse, while Lierse lost the promotion playoff.
- Sint-Truiden was promoted as 2014–15 Belgian Second Division champions.
- OH Leuven who won the promotion playoff and returned to the Belgian Pro League just one season after their relegation.

== Teams ==
=== Stadiums and locations ===
Location of the 2015–16 Belgian Pro League teams

Club	Location	Venue	Capacity
Anderlecht	Anderlecht	Constant Vanden Stock Stadium	21,000
Charleroi	Charleroi	Stade du Pays de Charleroi	14,000
Club Brugge	Brugge	Jan Breydel Stadium	29,042
Genk	Genk	Cristal Arena	24,956
Gent	Ghent	Ghelamco Arena	19,999
Kortrijk	Kortrijk	Guldensporen Stadion	9,399
Lokeren	Lokeren	Daknamstadion	9,560
Mechelen	Mechelen	AFAS-stadion Achter de Kazerne	13,213
Mouscron-Péruwelz	Mouscron	Stade Le Canonnier	10,571
Oostende	Ostend	Albertpark	8,000
Oud-Heverlee Leuven	Leuven	Den Dreef	9,493
Sint-Truiden	Sint-Truiden	Stayen	14,600
Standard Liège	Liège	Stade Maurice Dufrasne	28,278
Waasland-Beveren	Beveren	Freethiel Stadion	8,190
Westerlo	Westerlo	Het Kuipje	8,035
Zulte Waregem	Waregem	Regenboogstadion	9,540

=== Personnel and kits ===
Club	Manager	Captain	Kit Manufacturer	Sponsors
Anderlecht	(Kosovo) Besnik Hasi	(Belgium) Silvio Proto	adidas	BNP Paribas Fortis
Charleroi	(Belgium) Felice Mazzu	(Spain) Francisco Martos	MAPS	Proximus
Club Brugge	(Belgium) Michel Preud'homme	(Belgium) Timmy Simons	Nike	Daikin
Genk	(Belgium) Peter Maes	(Belgium) Thomas Buffel	Nike	Beobank
Gent	(Belgium) Hein Vanhaezebrouck	(Belgium) Sven Kums	Jartazi	VDK Spaarbank
Kortrijk	(France) Karim Belhocine	(Serbia) Nebojša Pavlović	Jako	AGO Jobs & HR
Lokeren	(Belgium) Georges Leekens	(Belgium) Killian Overmeire	Jartazi	QTeam
Mechelen	(Serbia) Aleksandar Janković	(Belgium) Steven De Petter	Kappa	Telenet
Mouscron-Péruwelz	(Belgium) Glen De Boeck	(Belgium) Noë Dussenne	Patrick	Trba
Oostende	(Belgium) Yves Vanderhaeghe	(Cameroon) Sébastien Siani	Joma	Willems Veranda's
OH Leuven	(Belgium) Emilio Ferrera	(France) Romain Reynaud	Vermarc	Just Eat
Sint-Truiden	(Northern Ireland) Chris O'Loughlin	(Belgium) Rob Schoofs	Kappa	Golden Palace
Standard Liège	(Belgium) Yannick Ferrera	(France) Adrien Trebel	Kappa	BASE
Waasland-Beveren	(Belgium) Stijn Vreven	(Serbia) Miloš Marić	Kappa	Aims Tools; Star Casino
Westerlo	(Belgium) Bob Peeters	(Belgium) Filip Daems	Saller	Soudal
Zulte-Waregem	(Belgium) Francky Dury	(Senegal) Mbaye Leye	Patrick	Record Bank

=== Managerial changes ===
Team	Outgoing manager	Manner of departure	Date of vacancy	Position	Replaced by	Date of appointment
Waasland-Beveren	(Belgium) Guido Brepoels	Contract not prolonged	End of 2014–15 season	Pre-season	(Belgium) Stijn Vreven	29 April 2015
Oostende	(Belgium) Frederik Vanderbiest	Replaced by Vanderhaeghe	End of 2014–15 season	Pre-season	(Belgium) Yves Vanderhaeghe	11 May 2015
Genk	(Scotland) Alex McLeish	Resigned	End of 2014–15 season	Pre-season	(Belgium) Peter Maes	26 May 2015
Kortrijk	(Belgium) Yves Vanderhaeghe	Signed by Oostende	End of 2014–15 season	Pre-season	(Belgium) Johan Walem	29 May 2015
Lokeren	(Belgium) Peter Maes	Signed by Genk	End of 2014–15 season	Pre-season	(Belgium) Bob Peeters	3 June 2015
Mouscron-Péruwelz	(France) Fernando Da Cruz	Contract not prolonged	End of 2014–15 season	Pre-season	(North Macedonia) Čedomir Janevski	4 June 2015
Standard Liège	(Belgium) José Riga	Resigned	End of 2014–15 season	Pre-season	(Serbia) Slavoljub Muslin	5 June 2015
Standard Liège	(Serbia) Slavoljub Muslin	Sacked	28 August 2015	8th	(Belgium) Éric Deflandre (caretaker)	28 August 2015
Standard Liège	(Belgium) Éric Deflandre (caretaker)	Caretaker replaced	7 September 2015	11th	(Belgium) Yannick Ferrera	7 September 2015
Sint-Truiden	(Belgium) Yannick Ferrera	Signed by Standard Liège	7 September 2015	5th	(Northern Ireland) Chris O'Loughlin	8 September 2015
Lokeren	(Belgium) Bob Peeters	Sacked	24 October 2015	14th	(Belgium) Georges Leekens	25 October 2015
OH Leuven	(Belgium) Jacky Mathijssen	Sacked	24 November 2015	15th	(Belgium) Emilio Ferrera	26 November 2015
Westerlo	(Netherlands) Harm van Veldhoven	Sacked	25 November 2015	16th	(Belgium) Bob Peeters	26 November 2015
Mouscron-Péruwelz	(North Macedonia) Čedomir Janevski	Sacked	19 January 2016	15th	(Belgium) Glen De Boeck	20 January 2016
Kortrijk	(Belgium) Johan Walem	Sacked	8 February 2016	9th	(France) Karim Belhocine	8 February 2016
Kortrijk	(France) Karim Belhocine	Becomes technical director	1 April 2016	9th	(Belgium) Patrick De Wilde	1 April 2016

== Regular season ==
=== League table ===
Pos	Team	Pld	W	D	L	GF	GA	GD	Pts	Qualification or relegation
1	Club Brugge	30	21	1	8	64	30	+34	64	Qualification for the Championship play-offs
2	Gent	30	17	9	4	56	29	+27	60	Qualification for the Championship play-offs
3	Anderlecht	30	15	10	5	51	29	+22	55	Qualification for the Championship play-offs
4	Oostende	30	14	7	9	55	44	+11	49	Qualification for the Championship play-offs
5	Genk	30	14	6	10	42	30	+12	48	Qualification for the Championship play-offs
6	Zulte Waregem	30	12	7	11	51	50	+1	43	Qualification for the Championship play-offs
7	Standard Liège	30	12	5	13	41	51	−10	41	Qualification for the Europa League play-offs
8	Charleroi	30	10	9	11	36	39	−3	39	Qualification for the Europa League play-offs
9	Kortrijk	30	10	9	11	31	35	−4	39	Qualification for the Europa League play-offs
10	Mechelen	30	10	7	13	48	50	−2	37	Qualification for the Europa League play-offs
11	Lokeren	30	8	10	12	35	40	−5	34	Qualification for the Europa League play-offs
12	Waasland-Beveren	30	9	6	15	40	57	−17	33	Qualification for the Europa League play-offs
13	Sint-Truiden	30	8	6	16	28	47	−19	30	Qualification for the Europa League play-offs
14	Mouscron-Péruwelz	30	7	9	14	39	51	−12	30	Qualification for the Europa League play-offs
15	Westerlo	30	7	9	14	35	59	−24	30	
16	OH Leuven (R)	30	7	8	15	42	53	−11	29	Relegation to First Division B

Source: Belgian Pro League, Soccerway
Rules for classification: 1) Points; 2) Matches won; 3) Goal difference; 4) Goals scored; 5) Away goals scored; 6) Away matches won; 7) Play-off.
(R) Relegated

=== Positions by round ===
Note: The classification was made after the weekend (or midweek) of each matchday, so postponed matches were only processed at the time they were played to represent the real evolution in standings.

- On matchday 16, the matches Lokeren - Anderlecht and Mouscron-Péruwelz - Charleroi were postponed due to increased safety measures following the November 2015 Paris attacks. These matches were played on 22 and 23 December, between matchdays 20 and 21.

Team ╲ Round	1	2	3	4	5	6	7	8	9	10	11	12	13	14	15	16	17	18	19	20	21	22	23	24	25	26	27	28	29	30
Club Brugge	11	6	7	3	6	3	7	7	5	6	5	6	5	4	4	2	2	1	2	3	3	2	2	2	1	1	1	1	1	1
Gent	8	5	6	2	4	8	6	6	4	2	2	3	2	1	2	1	1	2	1	1	1	1	1	1	2	2	2	2	2	2
Anderlecht	4	1	1	6	3	1	2	2	2	3	3	1	3	2	3	4	4	4	4	4	2	3	3	3	3	3	3	3	3	3
Oostende	1	1	1	1	1	2	1	1	1	1	1	2	1	3	1	3	3	3	3	2	4	4	4	4	4	4	4	4	4	4
Genk	1	8	9	4	9	6	5	5	7	4	4	4	6	6	9	6	7	7	6	6	7	6	6	6	5	5	5	5	5	5
Zulte Waregem	1	7	8	11	5	4	3	4	3	5	6	5	4	5	5	5	5	5	5	5	5	5	5	5	6	7	8	6	7	6
Standard Liège	11	10	4	7	8	11	13	15	15	15	16	15	11	13	11	12	9	9	7	7	8	7	7	7	8	8	7	7	6	7
Charleroi	5	4	5	10	10	13	14	13	9	8	9	10	9	9	8	9	10	13	10	11	6	8	8	8	7	6	6	8	9	8
Kortrijk	5	10	11	13	14	9	9	9	8	10	7	9	8	8	7	7	6	6	8	8	12	13	10	10	10	10	10	9	8	9
Mechelen	14	16	13	15	11	10	11	12	14	13	12	12	13	11	13	11	13	11	12	13	10	11	11	11	12	9	9	10	10	10
Lokeren	14	13	14	9	13	14	10	10	12	14	15	14	15	12	12	13	12	10	11	12	9	9	9	9	11	12	11	12	12	11
Waasland-Beveren	10	9	12	8	7	7	8	8	10	9	10	8	10	10	10	10	11	12	13	10	13	12	13	13	13	13	13	11	11	12
Sint-Truiden	5	3	3	5	2	5	4	3	6	7	8	7	7	7	6	8	8	8	9	9	11	10	12	12	9	11	12	13	14	13
Mouscron-Péruwelz	11	14	16	16	16	16	16	11	11	11	13	11	12	14	14	14	14	14	14	14	14	15	15	15	15	16	14	15	13	14
Westerlo	8	12	10	12	12	15	15	16	16	16	14	16	16	16	16	16	16	16	16	16	16	16	16	16	16	14	15	16	16	15
OH Leuven	14	15	15	14	15	12	12	14	13	12	11	13	14	15	15	15	15	15	15	15	15	14	14	14	14	15	16	14	15	16

Source: soccerassociation.com

=== Results ===
Home \ Away	AND	CHA	BRU	GNK	GNT	KVK	OHL	LOK	KVM	MOU	KVO	STV	STA	WBE	WES	ZWA
Anderlecht		2–1	3–1	0–0	1–1	3–0	3–2	1–0	1–1	2–0	1–1	1–0	3–3	3–2	2–1	3–0
Charleroi	1–1		0–0	1–0	1–1	1–1	2–1	1–2	3–2	2–1	1–1	0–0	2–3	2–3	0–0	3–0
Club Brugge	1–4	2–1		1–0	1–0	2–1	2–0	2–1	3–0	3–0	1–0	3–0	7–1	5–1	6–0	3–0
Genk	0–0	2–0	3–2		0–1	1–0	3–1	0–2	3–1	0–4	4–1	3–0	3–1	6–1	2–1	2–1
Gent	2–0	1–3	4–1	1–0		3–0	1–1	3–1	2–2	2–0	2–2	1–0	4–1	2–1	5–0	2–2
Kortrijk	1–1	2–0	1–4	1–0	0–0		0–0	0–0	1–0	1–3	2–1	3–0	2–1	3–1	1–1	1–0
OH Leuven	0–2	2–0	0–1	1–3	0–2	1–0		3–3	3–1	1–1	4–1	1–0	0–2	0–2	5–1	2–3
Lokeren	1–1 (Note: The matches Lokeren - Anderlecht (21 November) and Mouscron-Péruwelz - Charleroi (22 November) were postponed due to increased safety measures following the November 2015 Paris attacks. These matches were rescheduled to 22 and 23 December.)	2–2	0–1	0–0	1–2	3–1	1–2		2–0	1–2	0–1	1–1	0–2	1–2	2–1	1–1
Mechelen	2–2	0–1	1–4	1–1	2–0	0–2	2–1	1–1		3–1	2–1	3–0	4–0	2–0	2–2	3–4
Mouscron-Péruwelz	2–1	0–1	2–1	0–1	1–2	0–1	3–1	1–1	2–3		2–2	0–2	1–1	0–1	2–2	2–2
Oostende	3–1	2–1	0–2	3–2	5–2	1–0	3–0	2–0	3–1	3–3		1–2	4–1	3–3	2–1	0–2
Sint-Truiden	1–2	1–1	2–1	3–1	0–2	2–1	2–2	1–1	0–3	0–1	1–1		1–0	1–3	1–2	1–2
Standard Liège	1–0	3–0	2–0	2–1	0–3	1–1	2–2	0–1	2–1	3–0	1–2	1–2		1–0	1–2	2–1
Waasland-Beveren	1–0	0–1	1–2	0–1	1–3	2–1	2–2	2–3	0–0	3–3	1–5	2–1	0–0		2–2	2–1
Westerlo	0–3	2–1	0–2	0–0	1–1	1–1	3–2	1–2	3–2	2–2	0–1	0–3	2–0	1–0		1–2
Zulte Waregem	0–4	2–3	2–0	0–0	1–1	2–2	2–2	3–1	2–3	3–0	1–0	4–0	2–3	2–1	4–2	

Updated to match(es) played on 13 March 2016. Source: Belgian Pro League
Legend: Blue = home team win; Yellow = draw; Red = away team win.

== Championship play-offs ==
The points obtained during the regular season were halved (and rounded up) before the start of the playoff. As a result, the teams started with the following points before the playoff: Club Brugge 32 points, Gent 30, Anderlecht 28, Oostende 25, Genk 24 and Zulte Waregem 22.

=== Play-off table ===
Pos	Team	Pld	W	D	L	GF	GA	GD	Pts	Qualification	CLU	AND	GNT	GNK	OOS	ZWA
1	Club Brugge (C)	10	7	1	2	25	9	+16	54	Qualification for the Champions League group stage	—	4–0	2–0	3–1	2–2	5–0
2	Anderlecht	10	6	1	3	15	16	−1	47	Qualification for the Champions League third qualifying round	1–0	—	2–0	1–0	2–1	2–0
3	Gent	10	3	3	4	10	15	−5	42	Qualification for the Europa League third qualifying round	1–4	1–1	—	0–0	2–0	1–1
4	Genk (O)	10	5	1	4	20	13	+7	40	Qualification for the play-off final	4–2	5–2	1–2	—	4–0	2–0
5	Oostende	10	3	2	5	14	19	−5	36		0–1	4–2	0–1	2–1	—	3–3
6	Zulte Waregem	10	1	2	7	11	23	−12	27		0–2	1–2	4–2	1–2	1–2	—

Source: Belgian Pro League, Soccerway
Rules for classification: 1) Points; 2) Points without (possible) half points added due to rounding; 3) Matches won; 4) Goal difference; 5) Goals scored; 6) Away goals scored; 7) Away matches won; 8) Play-off.
(C) Champions; (O) Play-off winners

=== Positions by round ===
Below the positions per round are shown. As teams did not all start with an equal number of points, the initial pre-playoffs positions are also given.

Team ╲ Round	Initial	1	2	3	4	5	6	7	8	9	10
Club Brugge	1	1	1	1	1	1	1	1	1	1	1
Anderlecht	3	3	2	2	2	3	2	2	2	2	2
Gent	2	2	3	3	3	2	3	3	3	3	3
Genk	5	5	4	4	4	4	4	4	4	4	4
Oostende	4	4	5	5	5	5	5	5	5	5	5
Zulte Waregem	6	6	6	6	6	6	6	6	6	6	6

Source: Soccerway

== Europa League play-offs ==
Group A contains the teams finishing the regular season in positions 7, 9, 12 and 14. The teams that finish in positions 8, 10, 11 and 13 are placed in Group B.

=== Group A ===
Pos	Team	Pld	W	D	L	GF	GA	GD	Pts	Qualification	KVK	STA	RMP	W-B
1	Kortrijk	6	4	2	0	13	5	+8	14	Qualification for the play-off semi finals	—	1–0	0–0	5–0
2	Standard Liège	6	3	1	2	8	5	+3	10	Qualification for the Europa League group stage (Note: Standard Liège qualified for the Europa League group stage by winning the 2015–16 Belgian Cup.)	1–1	—	4–1	2–0
3	Mouscron-Péruwelz	6	1	2	3	5	8	−3	5		2–3	2–0	—	0–0
4	Waasland-Beveren	6	1	1	4	3	11	−8	4		2–3	0–1	1–0	—

Source: Belgian Pro League, Soccerway
Rules for classification: 1) Points; 2) Matches won; 3) Goal difference; 4) Goals scored; 5) Away goals scored; 6) Away matches won; 7) Play-off.

=== Group B ===
Pos	Team	Pld	W	D	L	GF	GA	GD	Pts	Qualification	CHA	LOK	KVM	STR
1	Charleroi	6	3	2	1	13	6	+7	11	Qualification for the play-off semi finals	—	2–2	4–0	1–1
2	Lokeren	6	3	2	1	12	7	+5	11		1–0	—	5–1	1–0
3	Mechelen	6	2	1	3	7	14	−7	7		2–3	2–1	—	1–1
4	Sint-Truiden	6	0	3	3	4	9	−5	3		0–3	2–2	0–1	—

Source: Belgian Pro League, Soccerway
Rules for classification: 1) Points; 2) Matches won; 3) Goal difference; 4) Goals scored; 5) Away goals scored; 6) Away matches won; 7) Play-off.

=== Play off Semi finals ===
The winners of both playoff groups compete in a two-legged match to play the fourth-placed team of the championship play-offs, called 2015–16 Belgian Pro League#Play off final. The winner of this Testmatch was granted an entry to the second qualifying round of the 2016–17 UEFA Europa League.

13 May 2016
20:30

Charleroi	1–0	Kortrijk
Perbet 90'	Report

Stade du Pays de Charleroi, Charleroi
Attendance: 7,038
Referee: Alexandre Boucaut

21 May 2016
20:00

Kortrijk	1–2	Charleroi
Sarr 74'	Report	Perbet 53'; Baby 90+4'

Guldensporen Stadion, Kortrijk
Attendance: 7,100
Referee: Serge Gumienny

Charleroi won 3–1 on aggregate.

=== Play off final ===
The matches were played over two legs between the Europa League play-off final winners and the fourth-placed team of the championship play-offs. The winner qualified for the second qualifying round of the 2016–17 UEFA Europa League.

26 May 2016
20:30

Charleroi	2–0	Genk
Baby 43'; Perbet 50'	Report

Stade du Pays de Charleroi, Charleroi
Attendance: 8,733
Referee: Erik Lambrechts

29 May 2016
14:30

Genk	5–1	Charleroi
Karelis 20' (pen.), 56', 71'; Samatta 27'; Walsh 45+3'	Report	Perbet 40'

Cristal Arena, Genk
Attendance: 14,635
Referee: Wim Smet

Genk won 5–3 on aggregate.

== Season statistics ==
=== Top scorers ===
As of matches played on 7 May 2016.

Rank	Player	Club	Goals
1	(France) Jérémy Perbet	Charleroi	20
2	(Senegal) Mbaye Leye	Zulte Waregem	18
3	(Algeria) Sofiane Hanni	Mechelen	17
4	(Italy) Stefano Okaka	Anderlecht	14
5	(Ivory Coast) Cyriac	Oostende	13
5	(Belgium) Laurent Depoitre	Gent	13
5	(Mali) Abdoulay Diaby	Club Brugge	13
5	(Benin) Frédéric Gounongbe	Westerlo	13
5	(Belgium) Sven Kums	Gent	13
5	(Belgium) Jelle Vossen	Club Brugge	13

=== Top assists ===
As of matches played on 8 April 2016.

Rank	Player	Club	Assists
1	(Turkey) Onur Kaya	Zulte Waregem	12
2	(Togo) Mathieu Dossevi	Standard Liège	10
3	(France) Thibault Moulin	Waasland-Beveren	9
4	(Jamaica) Leon Bailey	Genk	7
4	(Algeria) Sofiane Hanni	Mechelen	7
4	(Switzerland) Danijel Milićević	Gent	7
4	(South Africa) Ayanda Patosi	Lokeren	7
8	(France) Franck Berrier	Oostende	6
8	(Belgium) Steven Defour	Anderlecht	6
8	(France) Anthony Knockaert	Standard Liège	6
8	(Belgium) Jordan Lukaku	Oostende	6
8	(Belgium) Tim Matthys	Mechelen	6
8	(Belgium) Dennis Praet	Anderlecht	6
8	(Belgium) Jordan Remacle	OH Leuven	6
8	(France) Clément Tainmont	Charleroi	6
8	(Belgium) Leandro Trossard	OH Leuven	6

=== Multiple goals in one match ===
Key
^{3}	Player scored three goals, completing a hat-trick.
^{4}	Player scored four goals.
*	The home team

Player	For	Against	Goals	Match Result	Date
(Belgium) Igor de Camargo	Genk*	OH Leuven	26' (1–0), 81' (3–1)	3–1	25 July 2015
(Luxembourg) Maxime Chanot	Kortrijk*	Standard Liège	40' (1–0), 64' (2–1)	2–1	25 July 2015
(North Macedonia) Jovan Kostovski	OH Leuven	Westerlo*	21' (0–1), 78' (3–2)	3–2	8 August 2015
(Zimbabwe) Knowledge Musona	Oostende*	Anderlecht	3' (1–0), 89' (3–1, pen.)	3–1	16 August 2015
(France) Steeven Langil	Waasland-Beveren*	Mouscron-Péruwelz	6' (1–0), 90+2' (3–3)	3–3	22 August 2015
(Belgium) Laurent Depoitre	Gent*	Mechelen	49' (1–1), 90+3' (2–2)	2–2	29 August 2015
(Belgium) Christophe Lepoint	Zulte Waregem	Oostende*	42' (0–1), 68' (0–2)	0–2	29 August 2015
(Mali) Abdoulay Diaby ^{4}	Club Brugge*	Standard Liège	8' (1–0), 37' (4–1), 77' (6–1), 90+1' (7–1)	7–1	30 August 2015
(Ivory Coast) Cyriac ^{3}	Oostende	Waasland-Beveren*	34' (0–2, pen.), 48' (0–3), 52' (0–4)	1–5	12 September 2015
(Belgium) Thomas Matton	Gent*	Standard Liège	62' (3–1), 90' (4–1)	4–1	20 September 2015
(Belgium) Tuur Dierckx	Club Brugge*	Waasland-Beveren	40' (1–0), 46' (3–0)	5–1	20 September 2015
(Senegal) Mbaye Leye	Zulte Waregem*	Westerlo	42' (2–1), 49' (3–1, pen.)	4–2	25 September 2015
(Belgium) Sven Kums ^{3}	Gent*	Club Brugge	15' (1–0, pen.), 51' (2–0, pen.), 62' (3–0)	4–1	4 October 2015
(Belgium) Benjamin De Ceulaer	Westerlo	Standard Liège*	9' (0–1), 44' (0–2)	1–2	17 October 2015
(France) Yohan Croizet	OH Leuven	Lokeren*	3' (0–1), 73' (0–2)	1–2	17 October 2015
(Italy) Stefano Okaka	Anderlecht	Zulte Waregem*	14' (0–1), 52' (0–3)	0–4	18 October 2015
(Algeria) Sofiane Hanni	Mechelen*	Zulte Waregem	35' (2–1), 66' (3–3)	3–4	24 October 2015
(Senegal) Mame Thiam	Zulte Waregem	Mechelen*	16' (1–1), 70' (3–4)	3–4	24 October 2015
(France) Yohan Boli	Sint-Truiden*	Kortrijk	48' (1–1), 52' (2–1)	2–1	25 October 2015
(Brazil) Fernando Canesin	Oostende*	Genk	27' (1–0), 35' (2–0)	3–2	27 October 2015
(Mali) Abdoulay Diaby	Club Brugge*	OH Leuven	41' (1–0), 69' (2–0)	2–0	28 October 2015
(Honduras) Andy Najar	Anderlecht*	Mouscron-Péruwelz	51' (1–0), 90+3' (2–0)	2–0	1 November 2015
(Benin) Frédéric Gounongbe	Westerlo	Waasland-Beveren*	43' (0–1), 58' (0–2)	2–2	7 November 2015
(France) Jérémy Perbet	Charleroi	Gent*	23' (0–1), 61' (1–3)	1–3	8 November 2015
(Belgium) Sven Kums	Gent*	Westerlo	68' (4–0, pen.), 77' (5–0)	5–0	20 November 2015
(Guinea) Idrissa Sylla	Anderlecht*	OH Leuven	39' (2–1), 68' (3–2)	3–2	29 November 2015
(Belgium) Jelle Vossen	Club Brugge	Mechelen*	66' (1–1), 73' (1–2)	1–4	29 November 2015
(North Macedonia) Jovan Kostovski	OH Leuven*	Westerlo	9' (1–0), 24' (2–0)	5–1	5 December 2015
(Serbia) Marko Šćepović	Mouscron-Péruwelz	Kortrijk*	15' (0–1), 84' (1–3)	1–3	12 December 2015
(Benin) Frédéric Gounongbe	Westerlo*	Charleroi	41' (1–1), 70' (2–1, pen.)	2–1	19 December 2015
(Belgium) Dennis Praet	Anderlecht	Club Brugge*	35' (0–2), 90+3' (1–4)	1–4	20 December 2015
(Zimbabwe) Knowledge Musona	Oostende*	Standard Liège	31' (2–1), 50' (3–1)	4–1	20 December 2015
(Belgium) Laurent Depoitre	Gent*	Anderlecht	10' (1–0), 89' (2–0)	2–0	17 January 2016
(Croatia) Ivan Santini	Standard Liège	Lokeren*	56' (0–1), 65' (0–2)	0–2	17 January 2016
(Belgium) Siebe Schrijvers	Waasland-Beveren	Oostende*	7' (0–1), 17' (1–2)	3–3	17 January 2016
(Israel) Lior Refaelov	Club Brugge*	Lokeren	12' (1–1), 28' (2–1)	2–1	31 January 2016
(Ghana) Frank Acheampong	Anderlecht	Mechelen*	18' (1–1), 70' (1–2)	2–2	5 February 2016
(Germany) Nick Proschwitz	Sint-Truiden	Standard Liège*	43' (1–1), 60' (1–2)	1–2	7 February 2016
(Greece) Nikos Karelis	Genk*	Waasland-Beveren	9' (1–0), 26' (2–1, pen.)	6–1	13 February 2016
(Belgium) Hans Vanaken	Club Brugge*	Westerlo	25' (2–0), 71' (4–0)	6–0	19 February 2016
(Greece) Thanasis Papazoglou	Kortrijk*	Sint-Truiden	17' (1–0), 51' (3–0)	3–0	20 February 2016
(Tunisia) Anice Badri	Mouscron-Péruwelz*	OH Leuven	88' (2–1), 90+3' (3–1)	3–1	20 February 2016
(Belgium) Michiel Jonckheere	Oostende*	Gent	13' (1–1), 54' (4–2)	5–2	21 February 2016
(England) John Bostock	OH Leuven*	Oostende	27' (1–0, pen.), 56' (3–0)	4–1	27 February 2016
(France) Yohan Croizet	OH Leuven*	Oostende	29' (2–0), 59' (4–0)	4–1	27 February 2016
(France) Thibault Moulin	Waasland-Beveren	Charleroi*	48' (1–1, pen.), 90+3' (2–3, pen.)	2–3	28 February 2016
(Ivory Coast) Cyriac	Oostende*	Charleroi	77' (1–1), 83' (2–1, pen.)	2–1	5 March 2016
(France) Nicolas Verdier	Mechelen*	Standard Liège	15' (2–0), 42' (3–0)	4–0	13 March 2016
(Algeria) Sofiane Hanni	Mechelen*	Standard Liège	12' (1–0), 78' (4–0)	4–0	13 March 2016
(Algeria) Sofiane Hanni	Mechelen*	Charleroi	77' (1–3), 85' (2–3, pen.)	2–3	16 April 2016
(Belgium) Jelle Vossen	Club Brugge*	Zulte Waregem	75' (4–0), 86' (5–0)	5–0	23 April 2016
(Democratic Republic of the Congo) Hervé Kage	Kortrijk*	Waasland-Beveren	28' (2–0), 37' (4–0, pen.)	5–0	23 April 2016
(France) Jérémy Perbet	Charleroi*	Mechelen	25' (2–0), 81' (4–0)	4–0	23 April 2016
(Belgium) Yassine El Ghanassy	Oostende*	Anderlecht	45+1' (3–0), 81' (4–1)	4–2	24 April 2016
(Tunisia) Hamdi Harbaoui	Lokeren	Charleroi*	6' (0–1), 8' (0–2)	2–2	29 April 2016
(France) Jérémy Perbet	Charleroi*	Lokeren	12' (1–2), 90+4' (2–2)	2–2	29 April 2016
(Democratic Republic of the Congo) Hervé Kage	Kortrijk	Mouscron-Péruwelz*	52' (1–1), 73' (1–2)	2–3	7 May 2016
(France) Julian Michel	Mouscron-Péruwelz*	Kortrijk	4' (1–0), 83' (2–2)	2–3	7 May 2016
(Tunisia) Hamdi Harbaoui ^{4}	Lokeren*	Mechelen	25' (1–0), 53' (3–0), 73' (4–1), 83' (5–1)	5–1	7 May 2016

== Attendances ==
No.	Club	Average attendance	Change	Highest
1	Club Brugge	26,129	0,5%	28,000
2	Standard de Liège	22,443	-8,6%	27,750
3	Anderlecht	20,118	-3,9%	21,500
4	Gent	19,911	7,8%	20,050
5	Genk	17,276	-0,8%	20,969
6	Mechelen	9,963	4,9%	12,000
7	STVV	8,910	36,9%	12,500
8	Charleroi	8,863	-3,4%	14,950
9	Zulte Waregem	8,616	2,5%	9,550
10	Lokeren	8,104	0,1%	10,700
11	Kortrijk	7,637	-4,1%	9,200
12	OH Leuven	7,173	36,3%	8,350
13	Westerlo	6,433	7,7%	8,000
14	Oostende	6,297	4,6%	7,450
15	Waasland-Beveren	5,031	-3,2%	7,900
16	Mouscron	3,283	-11,5%	7,500
