= Soualiho Meïté =

French footballer (born 1994)

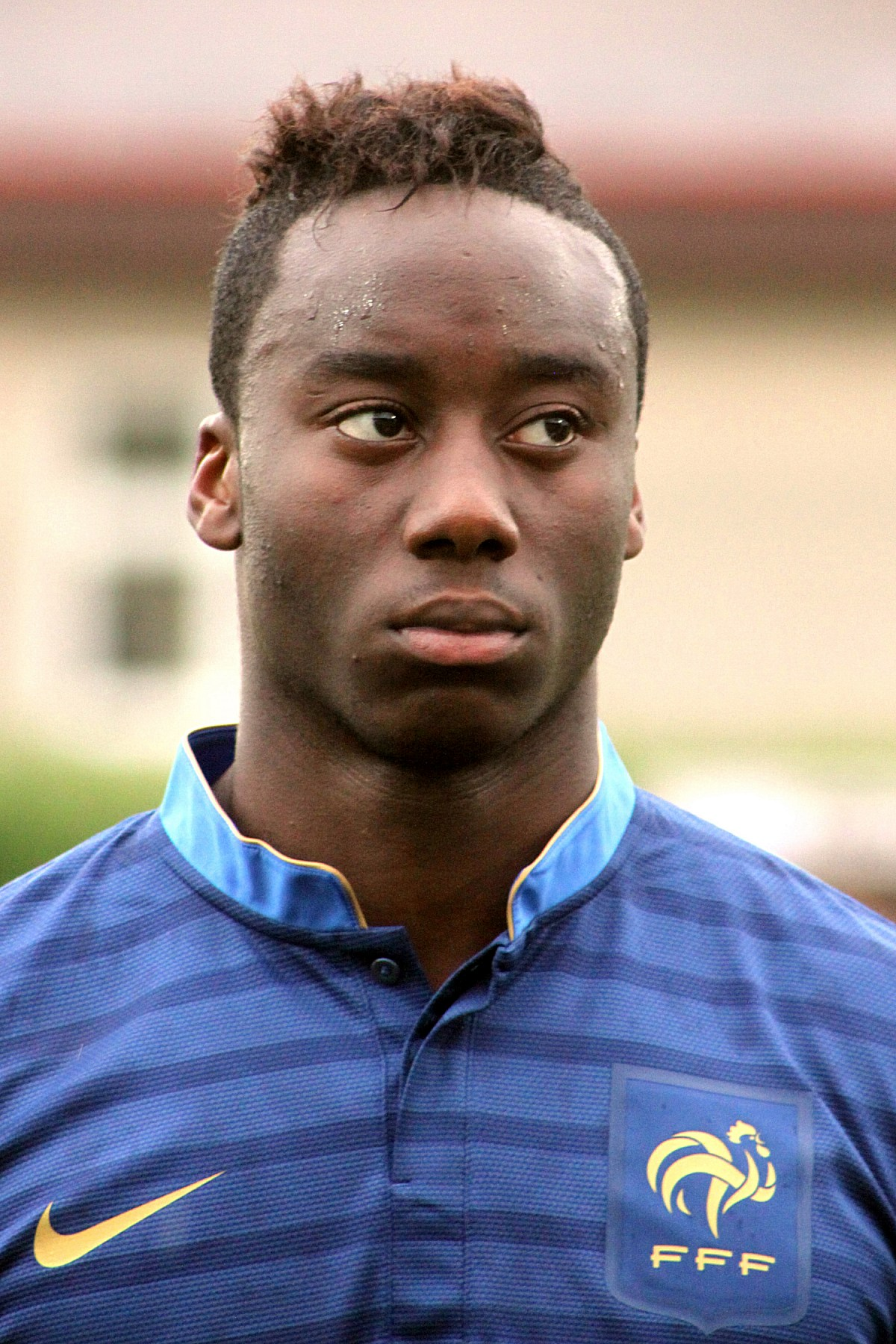

Personal information
- Date of birth: 17 March 1994 (age 32)
- Place of birth: Paris, France
- Height: 1.87 m (6 ft 2 in)
- Position: Midfielder

Team information
- Current team: PAOK
- Number: 8

Youth career
- 2002–2006: Gobelins
- 2006–2007: Vincennes
- 2007–2011: Auxerre

Senior career*
Years	Team	Apps	(Gls)
2011–2013	Auxerre B	30	(2)
2011–2013	Auxerre	24	(2)
2013–2016	Lille B	19	(2)
2013–2017	Lille	41	(0)
2016–2017	→ Zulte Waregem (loan)	58	(2)
2017–2018	Monaco	3	(0)
2018	→ Bordeaux (loan)	19	(1)
2018–2021	Torino	94	(3)
2021	→ AC Milan (loan)	21	(0)
2021–2025	Benfica	27	(0)
2022–2023	→ Cremonese (loan)	35	(0)
2023–2024	→ PAOK (loan)	30	(1)
2025	→ PAOK (loan)	10	(0)
2025–	PAOK	22	(0)

International career^{‡}
2009	France U16	5	(0)
2010–2011	France U17	17	(1)
2012–2013	France U19	7	(0)
2013–2014	France U20	2	(1)
- * Club domestic league appearances and goals as of 13 May 2026 ‡ National team caps and goals as of 2 May 2014

Soualiho Meïté (born 17 March 1994) is a French professional footballer who plays as a midfielder for Super League Greece club PAOK.

== Club career ==
=== Early career ===
On 14 March 2011, Meïté signed his first professional contract agreeing to a three-year deal with Auxerre. He was subsequently promoted to the senior team by manager Laurent Fournier and assigned the number 32 shirt. Meïté made his professional debut on 20 November in a 2–1 defeat against Valenciennes, appearing as a substitute.

=== Monaco ===
On 17 June 2017, Meïté was transferred to Monaco for €8 million. He made his debut for the club on 16 September that year.

On 2 January 2018, Meïté was loaned to Bordeaux. He scored his first goal on 15 April in a 3–1 away win against Montpellier.

=== Torino ===
On 10 July, Meïté was signed by Italian club Torino through an equal exchange with full-back Antonio Barreca, who moved to Monaco. He made his debut for the Granata on 12 August during Coppa Italia against Cosenza (4–0) as a starter. He scored his first goal for the club on 26 August in a 2–2 draw against Inter Milan at San Siro.

On 14 January, Meïté signed with AC Milan, on loan from Torino with an option to buy.

=== Benfica ===
Meïté joined Portuguese club Benfica in July 2021, signing a contract until 2026. The next stop in Meite's career was Benfica. In Lisbon he made 27 appearances before leaving on loan for Cremonese in the 2022–23 season, where he made 35 appearances and produced two assists.

=== PAOK ===
On 27 August 2023, Meïté joined PAOK on loan with an option to buy. The agreement for the 29-year-old French midfielder is for an option of four million euros, with the Lusitanians retaining a resale percentage (30%). Meïté made his debut with PAOK against OFI as a substitute on 3 September 2023. On 5 October Soualiho was named Fans' Man of the Match with a percentage of 31% against Eintracht Frankfurt in Toumba for the 2nd matchday of the UEFA Europa Conference League 2023-24 group stage. He scored his first goal for the club on 14 January in a 4–0 win against PAS Giannina at Toumba.

On 26 June 2025, PAOK triggered the option to buy Meïté. The French midfielder signed a contract for one year with the option for another year.

== International career ==
Born in France, Meïté is of Ivorian descent. A former France youth international, he represented his nation at under-16 and under-17 level. He played with the under-17 team at the 2011 FIFA U-17 World Cup.

== Career statistics ==
As of match played 24 October 2025

Appearances and goals by club, season and competition
Club	Season	League			National cup (Note: Includes Coupe de France, Belgian Cup, Coppa Italia, Taça de Portugal, Greek Football Cup)		League cup (Note: Includes Coupe de la Ligue, Taça da Liga)		Continental		Total	
Club	Season	Division	Apps	Goals	Apps	Goals	Apps	Goals	Apps	Goals	Apps	Goals
Auxerre B	2010–11	CFA	4	0	—		—		—		4	0
Auxerre B	2011–12	CFA	20	2	—		—		—		20	2
Auxerre B	2012–13	CFA	6	0	—		—		—		6	0
Auxerre B	Total		30	2	—		—		—		30	2
Auxerre	2011–12	Ligue 1	2	0	0	0	0	0	—		2	0
Auxerre	2012–13	Ligue 2	20	1	0	0	2	1	—		22	2
Auxerre	Total		22	1	0	0	2	1	—		24	2
Lille	2013–14	Ligue 1	19	0	3	0	1	0	—		23	0
Lille	2014–15	Ligue 1	8	0	1	0	2	0	3 (Note: Two appearances in UEFA Champions League, one appearance in UEFA Europa League)	0	14	0
Lille	2015–16	Ligue 1	3	0	—		1	0	—		4	0
Lille	Total		30	0	4	0	4	0	3	0	41	0
Lille B	2013–14	CFA	2	0	—		—		—		2	0
Lille B	2014–15	CFA	8	0	—		—		—		8	0
Lille B	2015–16	CFA 2	9	2	—		—		—		9	2
Lille B	Total		19	2	—		—		—		19	2
Zulte Waregem (loan)	2015–16	Belgian Pro League	12	0	—		—		—		12	0
Zulte Waregem (loan)	2016–17	Belgian Pro League	40	1	6	1	—		—		46	2
Zulte Waregem (loan)	Total		52	1	6	1	—		—		58	2
Monaco	2017–18	Ligue 1	2	0	—		0	0	1 (Note: Appearance(s) in UEFA Champions League)	0	3	0
Bordeaux (loan)	2017–18	Ligue 1	18	1	1	0	—		—		19	1
Torino	2018–19	Serie A	35	2	3	0	—		—		38	2
Torino	2019–20	Serie A	33	0	1	0	—		6 (Note: Appearances in UEFA Europa League)	0	40	0
Torino	2020–21	Serie A	14	1	2	0	—		—		16	1
Torino	Total		82	3	6	0	—		6	0	94	3
AC Milan (loan)	2020–21	Serie A	16	0	1	0	—		4	0	21	0
Benfica	2021–22	Primeira Liga	17	0	1	0	4	0	5	0	27	0
Cremonese (loan)	2022–23	Serie A	31	0	4	0	—		—		35	0
PAOK (loan)	2023–24	Super League Greece	30	1	5	0	—		7 (Note: Appearances in UEFA Europa Conference League)	0	42	1
PAOK (loan)	2024–25	Super League Greece	6	0	—		—		2	0	8	0
PAOK (loan)	Total		36	1	5	0	—		9	0	50	1
PAOK	2025–26	Super League Greece	7	0	1	0	—		7	2	15	2
Career total			352	11	29	1	10	1	33	2	436	15

== Honours ==
Zulte Waregem

- Belgian Cup: 2016–17

Benfica

- Supertaça Cândido de Oliveira: 2023

PAOK

- Super League Greece: 2023–24
