= Timothy Derijck =

Belgian footballer (born 1987)

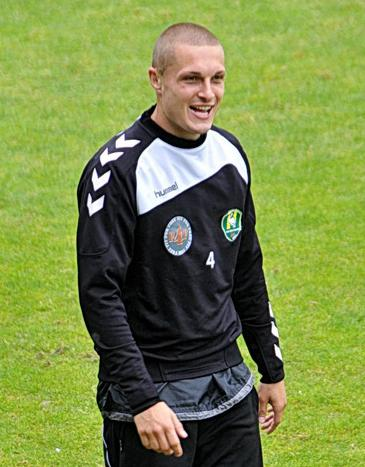
- Derijck in 2011

Personal information
- Date of birth: 25 May 1987 (age 39)
- Place of birth: Liedekerke, Belgium
- Height: 1.87 m (6 ft 2 in)
- Position: Centre-back

Youth career
- 1994–2000: Denderleeuw
- 2000–2005: Anderlecht

Senior career*
Years	Team	Apps	(Gls)
2005–2009	Feyenoord	23	(1)
2006	→ NAC Breda (loan)	12	(1)
2007–2008	→ Dender (loan)	30	(1)
2009–2011	ADO Den Haag	82	(8)
2011–2014	PSV	43	(4)
2013–2014	→ Utrecht (loan)	16	(0)
2014	Jong PSV	1	(0)
2014–2016	ADO Den Haag	49	(3)
2016–2018	Zulte Waregem	43	(7)
2018–2020	Gent	9	(0)
2020–2022	Kortrijk	45	(1)
2022–2024	Zulte Waregem	44	(1)
2024	ADO Den Haag	8	(2)

International career
2003	Belgium U16	19	(0)
2003–2004	Belgium U17	17	(3)
2004	Belgium U18	1	(0)
2004–2006	Belgium U19	24	(8)
2007	Belgium U21	4	(0)
- * Club domestic league appearances and goals as of 10 May 2024

Timothy Derijck (born 25 May 1987) is a Belgian football coach and former professional footballer who played as a centre-back and current assistant coach of KAA Gent.

== Club career ==
=== Early career ===
Derijck is a product of the Anderlecht youth academy, but left the Brussels giants for Feyenoord before making it into the first team. He also wore the jerseys of Dender and NAC Breda before joining ADO Den Haag in January 2009. It was where he developed himself into one of the most consistent defenders in the Eredivisie.

=== PSV Eindhoven ===
On 15 August 2011, PSV Eindhoven announced the signing of Derijck on a four-year contract from ADO Den Haag for a fee of €750,000. He was given the number 18 shirt. He made his debut on 21 August 2011 in PSV's 3–0 win over his former club Den Haag. He scored his first competitive goal for PSV in a 3–2 win over Achilles '29 on 27 September in the 2012–13 KNVB Beker. His first Eredivise goal for PSV was an equalizer against PEC Zwolle on 28 October 2012.

On 19 July 2013, it was announced that Derijck was sent on loan to FC Utrecht until the end of the season.

=== Return to ADO Den Haag ===
On 26 August 2014, Derijck returned to his former club ADO Den Haag. He signed a two-year deal on a free transfer.

=== Zulte Waregem ===
In June 2016, Derijck joined Belgian side Zulte Waregem.

=== Gent ===
In August 2018, Derijck joined Gent.

=== Return to Zulte Waregem ===
On 6 January 2022, Derijck returned to Zulte Waregem on a one-year contract, with an option for a second year. He returned to the pitch as a starter for Waregem in a 0–0 home draw against Oostende on 9 February. Derijck was a starter for the club for the remainder of the 2021–22 season, but saw himself increasingly demoted to the bench after suffering some injuries early on in the 2022–23 season as Modou Tambedou and Borja López were preferred at centre-back under new head coach Mbaye Leye. In October and November 2022, Lukas Willen also surpassed Derijck in the depth chart.

== International career ==
On 5 September 2011, he received his first call up to the senior Belgium national team for the friendly match against the United States. Coach Georges Leekens called him to replace the injured Jan Vertonghen. However, he was an unused substitute in a 1–1 draw.

== Career statistics ==
As of match played 29 March 2024

Appearances and goals by club, season and competition
Club	Season	League			National cup		Continental		Other		Total	
Club	Season	Division	Apps	Goals	Apps	Goals	Apps	Goals	Apps	Goals	Apps	Goals
Feyenoord	2005–06	Eredivisie	1	0	0	0	0	0	—		1	0
Feyenoord	2006–07	Eredivisie	18	1	0	0	2 (Note: Appearances in UEFA Cup)	0	0	0	20	1
Feyenoord	2008–09	Eredivisie	4	0	0	0	1	0	0	0	5	0
Feyenoord	Total		23	1	0	0	3	0	0	0	26	1
NAC Breda (loan)	2005–06	Eredivisie	12	1	—		—		5 (Note: Appearances in Eredivisie promotion/relegation play-offs)	0	17	1
Dender (loan)	2007–08	Belgian First Division	30	1	4	0	—		—		34	1
ADO Den Haag	2008–09	Eredivisie	17	3	0	0	—		—		17	3
ADO Den Haag	2009–10	Eredivisie	32	2	1	0	—		—		33	2
ADO Den Haag	2010–11	Eredivisie	33	3	2	0	—		4 (Note: Appearances in European play-offs)	0	39	3
ADO Den Haag	Total		82	8	3	0	0	0	4	0	89	8
PSV	2011–12	Eredivisie	20	0	2	0	6 (Note: Appearances in UEFA Europa League)	0	—		28	0
PSV	2012–13	Eredivisie	23	4	4	1	7	0	0	0	34	5
PSV	Total		43	4	6	1	13	0	0	0	62	5
FC Utrecht (loan)	2013–14	Eredivisie	16	0	3	0	—		—		19	0
Jong PSV	2014–15	Eerste Divisie	1	0	—		—		—		1	0
ADO Den Haag	2014–15	Eredivisie	22	0	1	0	—		—		23	0
ADO Den Haag	2015–16	Eredivisie	27	3	0	0	—		—		27	3
ADO Den Haag	Total		49	3	1	0	—		—		50	3
Zulte Waregem	2016–17	Belgian Pro League	30	7	4	2	—		—		34	9
Zulte Waregem	2017–18	Belgian Pro League	26	1	0	0	3	0	1 (Note: Appearance in Belgian Super Cup)	0	30	1
Zulte Waregem	2018–19	Belgian Pro League	5	1	0	0	—		—		5	1
Zulte Waregem	Total		61	9	4	2	3	0	1	0	69	11
Gent	2018–19	Belgian Pro League	17	1	4	0	—		—		21	1
Gent	2019–20	Belgian Pro League	0	0	1	0	0	0	—		1	0
Gent	Total		17	1	5	0	0	0	0	0	22	1
Kortrijk	2019–20	Belgian Pro League	7	0	2	0	—		—		9	0
Kortrijk	2020–21	Belgian Pro League	33	1	2	0	—		—		35	1
Kortrijk	2021–22	Belgian Pro League	5	0	0	0	—		—		5	0
Kortrijk	Total		45	1	4	0	0	0	0	0	49	1
Zulte Waregem	2021–22	Belgian Pro League	12	0	—		—		—		12	0
Zulte Waregem	2022–23	Belgian Pro League	22	1	3	0	—		—		25	1
Zulte Waregem	2023–24	Challenger Pro League	10	0	2	0	—		—		12	0
Zulte Waregem	Total		44	1	5	0	—		0	0	49	1
ADO Den Haag	2023–24	Eerste Divisie	8	2	—		—		—		8	2
Career total			431	32	35	3	19	0	10	0	495	35

== Honours ==
PSV Eindhoven

- KNVB Cup: 2011–12
- Johan Cruyff Shield: 2012

Zulte Waregem

- Belgian Cup: 2016–17
