= Aliko Bala =

Nigerian footballer (born 1997)

Personal information
- Full name: Aliko Mohammad Bala
- Date of birth: 27 February 1997 (age 29)
- Place of birth: Jos, Nigeria
- Height: 1.80 m (5 ft 11 in)
- Position: Winger

Team information
- Current team: Plateau United
- Number: 33

Youth career
- GBS Football Academy

Senior career*
Years	Team	Apps	(Gls)
2015–2016	AS Trenčín	32	(6)
2017–2019	Zulte Waregem	0	(0)
2018	→ Hapoel Acre	13	(1)
2018–2019	→ Hapoel Marmorek	29	(2)
2020–2021	Aswan	0	(0)
- * Club domestic league appearances and goals as of 20:42, 4 November 2019 (UTC)

Aliko Bala (born 27 February 1997) is a Nigerian professional footballer who plays as a winger.

== Club career ==
=== FK AS Trenčín ===
He came to AS Trenčín in summer 2015 together with his compatriot John Chia. He made his professional debut for AS against Ružomberok on 23 August 2015 as a substitute in the 67th minute of the match.

== Honours ==
Zulte Waregem

- Belgian Cup: 2016–17
