= Brian Hämäläinen =

Danish footballer (born 1989)

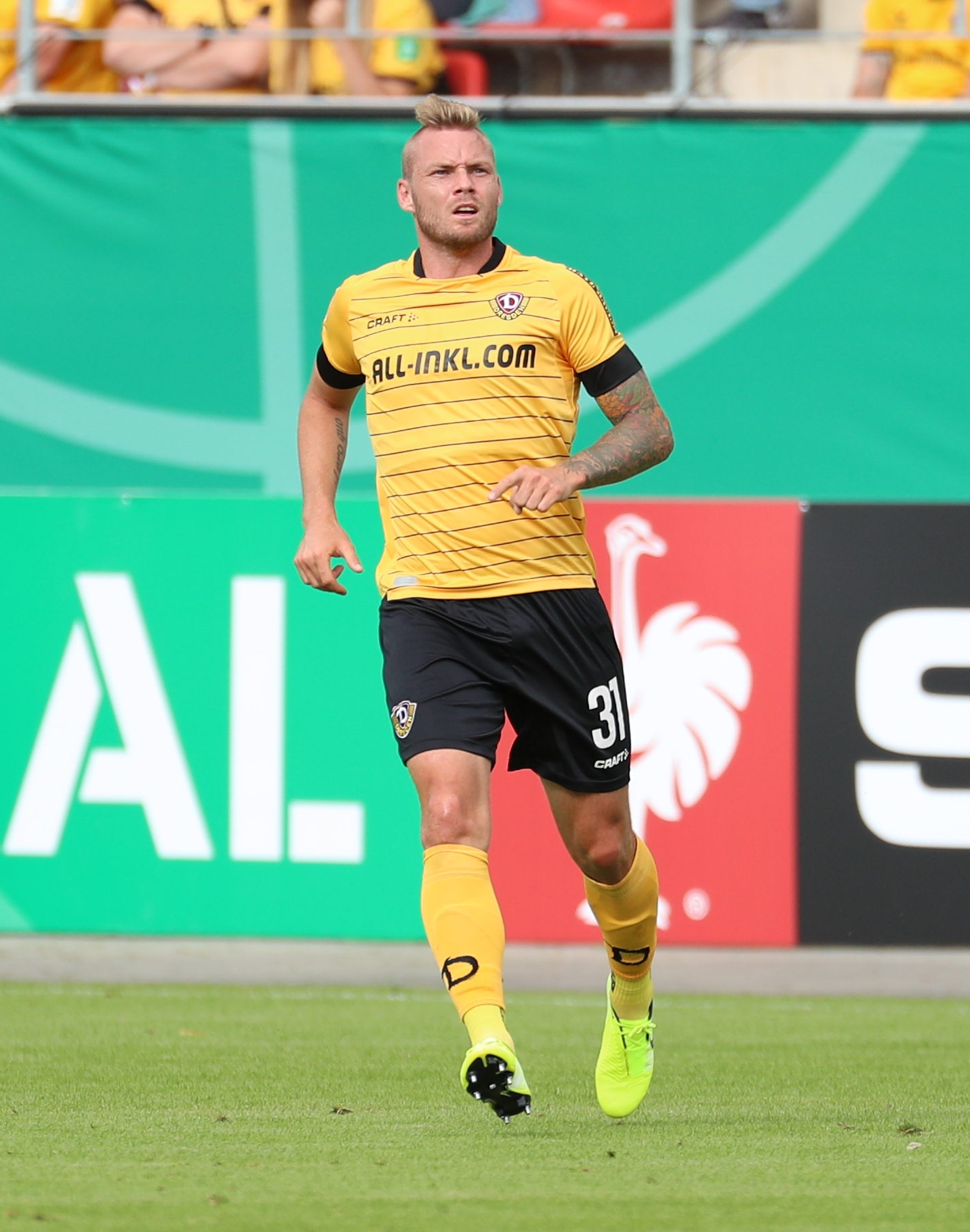

Personal information
- Full name: Brian Tømming Hämäläinen
- Date of birth: 29 May 1989 (age 37)
- Place of birth: Lillerød, Denmark
- Height: 1.76 m (5 ft 9 in)
- Position: Left-back

Youth career
- 1994–2003: Allerød FK
- 2003–2007: Lyngby

Senior career*
Years	Team	Apps	(Gls)
2007–2011	Lyngby	97	(4)
2011–2012	Zulte Waregem	39	(2)
2012–2016	Genk	42	(0)
2016–2018	Zulte Waregem	67	(6)
2018–2020	Dynamo Dresden	39	(1)
2020–2025	Lyngby	82	(0)
Total		366	(13)

International career
2004	Denmark U16	3	(0)
2005	Denmark U17	14	(1)
2006	Denmark U18	2	(0)
2006	Denmark U19	3	(0)
2008–2011	Denmark U21	10	(1)
- * Club domestic league appearances and goals as of 29 May 2025

Brian Tømming Hämäläinen (born 29 May 1989) is a Danish former professional footballer who played as a left-back. He last played for Lyngby Boldklub.

A former Denmark youth international, Hämäläinen made his breakthrough as part of Lyngby Boldklub before moving to Belgian Pro League club Zulte Waregem in 2011. After one season, he moved to Genk where he failed to establish himself as a starter. After four years, he returned to Zulte Waregem, before playing two years for Dynamo Dresden in the German 2. Bundesliga. He returned to Lyngby in 2020.

== Career ==
=== Lyngby ===
Hämäläinen began playing in the youth department of Allerød FK from 1994. In 2003, he moved to the youth academy of Lyngby. On 20 August 2007, he made his debut in a 1–6 loss to Esbjerg fB, coming on as a substitute for Andreas Bjelland in the 82nd minute.

He impressed and grew into a starter at the club, reaching almost 100 matches in the top two Danish leagues. In May 2009, he went on trial with Lille but later declined an offer to sign with the French side.

=== Zulte Waregem ===
In July 2011, Hämäläinen was signed by Belgian Pro League club Zulte Waregem. He started all matches in his first season at Zulte, and made five more appearances for the club the following season.

=== Genk ===
In August 2012, Hämäläinen moved to Genk. In the 2013–14 season, he made four appearances in the UEFA Europa League – where Genk were eliminated in the round of 32 against VfB Stuttgart – and ten games in the league, in which his club finished third. Thereby, the club took part in the championship play-offs and finished fifth. There, Hämäläinen was used in four games. He made three appearances in the Belgian Cup, which Genk won. In the following season, Hämäläinen played in two games in the Belgian Cup and was eliminated with Genk in the quarter-finals, while in the UEFA Europa League the club reached the last sixteen.

At Genk, Hämäläinen appeared in only 31 league matches during his four-year spell there.

=== Return to Zulte Waregem ===
In June 2016, Hämäläinen returned to Zulte Waregem on a two-year contract. He made three appearances in the Belgian cup competition, in which the club were eliminated by Standard Liège, and 16 total appearances in the league.

In the 2016–17 season, Hämäläinen won his second Belgian Cup as part of Zulte Waregem, beating Oostende in the final.

=== Dynamo Dresden ===
Between 2018 and 2020 he played for German 2. Bundesliga club Dynamo Dresden.

=== Return to Lyngby ===
In September 2020, Hämäläinen returned to Lyngby BK on a deal until the summer 2022. In January 2021, he suffered a knee injury in practice; tests later confirmed that he had sustained ligament damage which would sideline him for an extended period of time. At the end of the season, Lyngby suffered relegation to the Danish 1st Division after a loss to last placed AC Horsens.

On 4 March 2022, Hämäläinen made his first appearance for Lyngby since returning from injury, coming off the bench in injury time for Adam Sørensen in a 3–0 away win over Fremad Amager. After the club had won promotion back to the Superliga, Hämäläinen signed a one-year contract extension, keeping him in Lyngby until 2023.

On 12 May 2025, Hämäläinen announced that he would retire after the season.

== Personal life ==
Hämäläinen is of Finnish descent through his maternal great-grandfather. He was approached by Hasse Backe, coach of the Finland national team in 2016, but expressed that he did not consider himself Finnish.

== Career statistics ==
As of match played 12 November 2022

Appearances and goals by club, season and competition
Club	Season	League			National cup (Note: Includes Danish Cup, Belgian Cup, DFB-Pokal)		Europe		Other		Total	
Club	Season	Division	Apps	Goals	Apps	Goals	Apps	Goals	Apps	Goals	Apps	Goals
Lyngby	2007–08	Danish Superliga	12	0	0	0	—		—		12	0
Lyngby	2008–09	1st Division	25	1	3	0	—		—		28	1
Lyngby	2009–10	1st Division	27	1	0	0	—		—		27	1
Lyngby	2010–11	Superliga	33	2	2	0	—		—		34	2
Lyngby	Total		97	4	5	0	—		—		103	4
Zulte Waregem	2011–12	Pro League	34	2	2	0	—		—		36	2
Zulte Waregem	2012–13	Pro League	5	0	0	0	—		—		5	0
Zulte Waregem	Total		39	2	2	0	—		—		41	2
Genk	2012–13	Pro League	14	0	3	0	4 (Note: Appearance(s) in the UEFA Europa League)	0	—		21	0
Genk	2013–14	Pro League	11	0	2	0	3	0	0	0	16	0
Genk	2014–15	Pro League	1	0	0	0	—		—		1	0
Genk	2015–16	Pro League	16	0	2	0	—		1 (Note: Appearance in Belgian Pro League Europa League play-off)	0	19	0
Genk	Total		42	0	7	0	7	0	1	0	57	0
Zulte Waregem	2016–17	First Division A	35	2	4	1	—		—		39	3
Zulte Waregem	2017–18	First Division A	32	4	2	1	6	1	2 (Note: One appearance in Belgian Super Cup, one appearance in Belgian First Division A Europa League play-off)	0	42	6
Zulte Waregem	Total		67	6	6	2	6	1	2	0	81	9
Dynamo Dresden	2018–19	2. Bundesliga	21	1	1	0	—		—		22	1
Dynamo Dresden	2019–20	2. Bundesliga	18	0	2	0	—		—		20	3
Dynamo Dresden	Total		39	1	2	0	—		—		41	1
Lyngby	2020–21	Superliga	13	0	1	0	—		—		14	0
Lyngby	2021–22	1st Division	10	0	0	0	—		—		10	0
Lyngby	2022–23	Superliga	12	0	0	0	—		—		12	0
Lyngby	Total		35	0	1	0	—		—		36	0
Career total			319	13	23	2	13	1	3	0	358	16

== Honours ==
Genk

- Belgian Cup: 2012–13

Zulte Waregem

- Belgian Cup: 2016–17
