= Kenny Steppe =

Belgian footballer

Personal information
- Date of birth: 14 November 1988 (age 37)
- Place of birth: Antwerp, Belgium
- Height: 1.85 m (6 ft 1 in)
- Position: Goalkeeper

Youth career
- Germinal Beerschot
- Royal Antwerp

Senior career*
Years	Team	Apps	(Gls)
2006–2008	Germinal Beerschot	33	(0)
2008–2013	Heerenveen	14	(0)
2013–2015	Waasland-Beveren	17	(0)
2015–2017	Zulte Waregem	31	(0)
2017–2023	Sint-Truidense	67	(0)

International career
2007	Belgium U21	1	(0)
2007–2009	Belgium U23	1	(0)
- * Club domestic league appearances and goals as of 16:36, 5 April 2023 (UTC)

Kenny Steppe (born 14 November 1988) is a Belgian professional footballer who plays as a goalkeeper.

== Club career ==
As a child, Steppe played in the Germinal Beerschot youth ranks. However, after a few years, he came around to play for rivals Royal Antwerp FC, returning to Germinal in the 2006–07 season as a free agent.

He debuted on 3 February 2007 against Mons due to the injury of Luciano Da Silva.

The 2007–08 season proved to be his great breakthrough, becoming the first goalie after 6 matchdays. He also won the Belgian Goalkeeper of the Year award.

On the last weekend of the 2008 summer transfer window, he was sold to Heerenveen.

After years of injuries and competition, Steppe left Heerenveen on a free transfer and he signed with Waasland-Beveren to make a new start in his career.

== Honours ==
SC Heerenveen

- KNVB Cup: 2008–09

Zulte Waregem

- Belgian Cup: 2016–17
