= Sander Coopman =

Belgian footballer (born 1995)

Personal information
- Date of birth: 12 March 1995 (age 31)
- Place of birth: Ooigem, Belgium
- Height: 1.83 m (6 ft 0 in)
- Position: Attacking midfielder

Team information
- Current team: KVV Berg en Dal
- Number: 5

Youth career
- 2001–2007: Zulte-Waregem
- 2007–2013: Club Brugge

Senior career*
Years	Team	Apps	(Gls)
2013–2018	Club Brugge	11	(0)
2016–2018	→ Zulte Waregem (loan)	82	(5)
2018–2019	Oostende	23	(2)
2019–2022	Antwerp	10	(0)
2022–2025	Beveren	51	(5)
2025–2026	Borac Banja Luka	3	(0)
2026–	KVV Berg en Dal	0	(0)

International career
2013	Belgium U19	6	(2)
- * Club domestic league appearances and goals as of 3 February 2026

Sander Coopman (born 12 March 1995) is a Belgian professional footballer who plays as an attacking midfielder for Belgian club KVV Berg en Dal.

== Club career ==
Coopman joined Brugge at the age of 12 from S.V. Zulte Waregem. He made his senior debut at 11 December 2014 in the UEFA Europa League against HJK Helsinki. Brugge manager Michel Preud'homme gave him a place in his starting line-up. He was later sent on loan to his former club Zulte Waregem.

On 4 July 2019, he signed a three-year contract with Antwerp.

Coopman joined Challenger Pro League club Beveren on 2 August 2022, signing a one-year contract after a successful trial.

On 1 July 2025, Coopman signed a one-season contract with Borac Banja Luka in Bosnia and Herzegovina.

== Honours ==
Club Brugge

- Belgian Pro League: 2015–16
- Belgian Cup: 2014–15

Zulte Waregem

- Belgian Cup: 2016–17
