= Alessandro Cordaro =

Belgian footballer

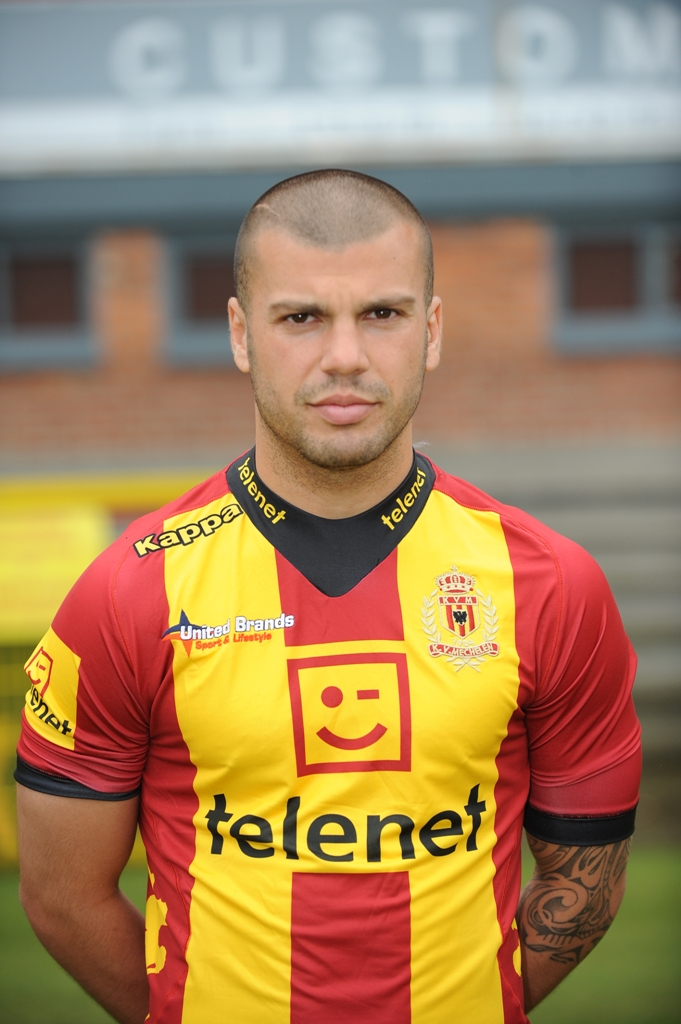

Personal information
- Full name: Alessandro Cordaro
- Date of birth: 2 May 1986 (age 40)
- Place of birth: La Louvière, Belgium
- Height: 1.75 m (5 ft 9 in)
- Position: Winger

Team information
- Current team: Swift Hesperange

Youth career
- 1992–2002: La Louvière

Senior career*
Years	Team	Apps	(Gls)
2002–2009	Mons	137	(10)
2009–2011	Charleroi	62	(4)
2011–2015	K.V. Mechelen	118	(12)
2015–2018	Zulte Waregem	46	(6)
2018–2019	Virton	16	(0)
2019–	Swift Hesperange	0	(0)

International career
2008–2009	Belgium U21	9	(0)
- * Club domestic league appearances and goals as of 20 November 2016

Alessandro Cordaro (born 2 May 1986) is a Belgian winger who plays for Swift Hesperange in the Luxembourg Division of Honour.

== Career ==
Cordaro began his career 1992 with R.A.A. Louviéroise and joined than in 2002 to Mons, here climbed 2006 with the team in the Jupiler League.

On 1 April 2009 R. Charleroi S.C. engaged the midfielder, who arrives from Mons and signed a three-year contract between 30 June 2012.

On 16 May 2011 he signed a 3-year contract with K.V. Mechelen

== Statistics ==
Season	Club	League	Games	Goals
2002/03	R.A.E.C. Mons	Jupiler League	2	0
2003/04	R.A.E.C. Mons	Jupiler League	3	0
2004/05	R.A.E.C. Mons	Jupiler League	18	0
2005/06	R.A.E.C. Mons	Tweede klasse	32	6
2006/07	R.A.E.C. Mons	Jupiler League	24	1
2007/08	R.A.E.C. Mons	Jupiler League	30	2
2008/09	R.A.E.C. Mons	Jupiler League	14	2
2009/10	R. Charleroi S.C.	Jupiler League	30	2
2010/11	R. Charleroi S.C.	Jupiler League	32	2
2011/12	K.V. Mechelen	Jupiler League	0	0

== International ==
Cordaro is of Italian descent. He has also played for Belgium U21 and holds nine games.

== Honours ==
Zulte Waregem

- Belgian Cup: 2016–17
