= Onur Kaya =

Belgian footballer

Personal information
- Date of birth: 20 April 1986 (age 40)
- Place of birth: Brussels, Belgium
- Height: 1.67 m (5 ft 6 in)
- Position: Attacking midfielder

Youth career
- 1993–2002: Anderlecht
- 2002–2005: Vitesse

Senior career*
Years	Team	Apps	(Gls)
2005–2010	Vitesse	76	(7)
2010–2014	Charleroi	100	(10)
2014–2015	Lokeren	20	(0)
2015–2018	Zulte Waregem	131	(12)
2018–2022	Mechelen	85	(5)
2022–2023	FC Kosova Schaerbeek		
Total		412	(34)

International career
2002	Belgium U17	5	(1)
- * Club domestic league appearances and goals

Onur Kaya (born 20 April 1986) is a Belgian former professional footballer who plays as a midfielder.

== Career ==
Kaya, who has dual Belgian-Turkish nationality, was born and raised in Brussels, but moved to the youth academy of Dutch Eredivisie club Vitesse in 2002. There, he made his professional debut on 11 February 2006 in the away game against Heerenveen. In May 2006, a few months after his debut, Kaya signed a contract four-year contract extension with Vitesse until the summer of 2010. He played a key role for the team in the following years alongside Mads Junker, Theo Janssen and Ruud Knol. However, in the 2007–08 and 2008–09 seasons, Kaya was mainly used as a substitute. In the 2009–10 season, he scored twice in the away match against Heracles Almelo and thus won a starting spot in the next games.

Before the start of the 2010–11 season, Kaya moved to Charleroi. He immediately suffered relegation to the Belgian Second Division with the club in his first season. After one season in the second tier, Charleroi immediately promoted back to the Belgian First Division A. In the 2012–13 season, he grew out to become the main force in midfield for the club.

In January 2014, Kaya signed with Lokeren. There, however, manager Peter Maes preferred other players in midfield and, partly due to the emerging talent Hans Vanaken, Kaya never won a place in the starting eleven.

On 8 January 2015, he signed a two-and-a-half-year contract with Zulte Waregem. On 18 March 2017, the club won the Belgian Cup, beating Oostende in the final. A penalty shootout after a match with extra time (2–2 after regular time, 3–3 after 120 min) resulted in the second cup win in club history. With this result, Zulte Waregem qualified for the group stage of the UEFA Europa League. There, Kaya played his former team Vitesse.

On 24 July 2018, Kaya joined Mechelen on a three-year deal after four seasons with Zulte Waregem. He grew into a team captain at the club.

On 24 August 2022, Kaya came out of retirement and joined FC Kosova Schaerbeek in the Belgian sixth tier league.

== Career statistics ==
As of match played on 17 April 2018

Appearances and goals by club, season and competition
Club	Season	League			Cup		League Cup		Other		Total	
Club	Season	Division	Apps	Goals	Apps	Goals	Apps	Goals	Apps	Goals	Apps	Goals
Vitesse	2005–06	Eredivisie	9	0	0	0	—				9	0
Vitesse	2006–07	Eredivisie	29	3	0	0	—				29	3
Vitesse	2007–08	Eredivisie	12	0	0	0	—				12	0
Vitesse	2008–09	Eredivisie	7	0	0	0	—				7	0
Vitesse	2009–10	Eredivisie	19	4	1	1	—				20	5
Vitesse	Total		76	7	1	1	0	0	0	0	77	8
Sporting Charleroi	2010–11	Belgian Pro League	29	2	1	0	—				30	2
Sporting Charleroi	2011–12	Belgian Second Division	19	3	1	0	—				20	3
Sporting Charleroi	2012–13	Belgian Pro League	34	4	2	0	—				36	4
Sporting Charleroi	2013–14	Belgian Pro League	18	1	0	0	—				18	1
Sporting Charleroi	Total		100	10	4	0	0	0	0	0	104	10
Lokeren	2013–14	Belgian Pro League	12	0	4	0	—				16	0
Lokeren	2014–15	Belgian Pro League	8	0	1	0	—		1	0	10	0
Lokeren	Total		20	0	5	0	0	0	1	0	26	0
Zulte Waregem	2014–15	Belgian Pro League	13	2	1	0	—				14	2
Zulte Waregem	2015–16	Belgian Pro League	38	1	2	1	—				40	2
Zulte Waregem	2016–17	Belgian First Division A	40	4	4	0	—				44	4
Zulte Waregem	2017–18	Belgian First Division A	28	3	1	0	—		10	1	39	4
Zulte Waregem	Total		119	10	8	1	0	0	10	1	137	12
Career totals			315	27	18	2	0	0	11	1	344	30

== International career ==
Kaya was a youth international for Belgium, at the U19 level.

== Honours ==
Lokeren

- Belgian Cup: 2013–14

Zulte Waregem

- Belgian Cup: 2016-17

=== Individual ===
- Belgian Pro League top assist provider: 2015–16
