= Sammy Bossut =

Belgian association football player

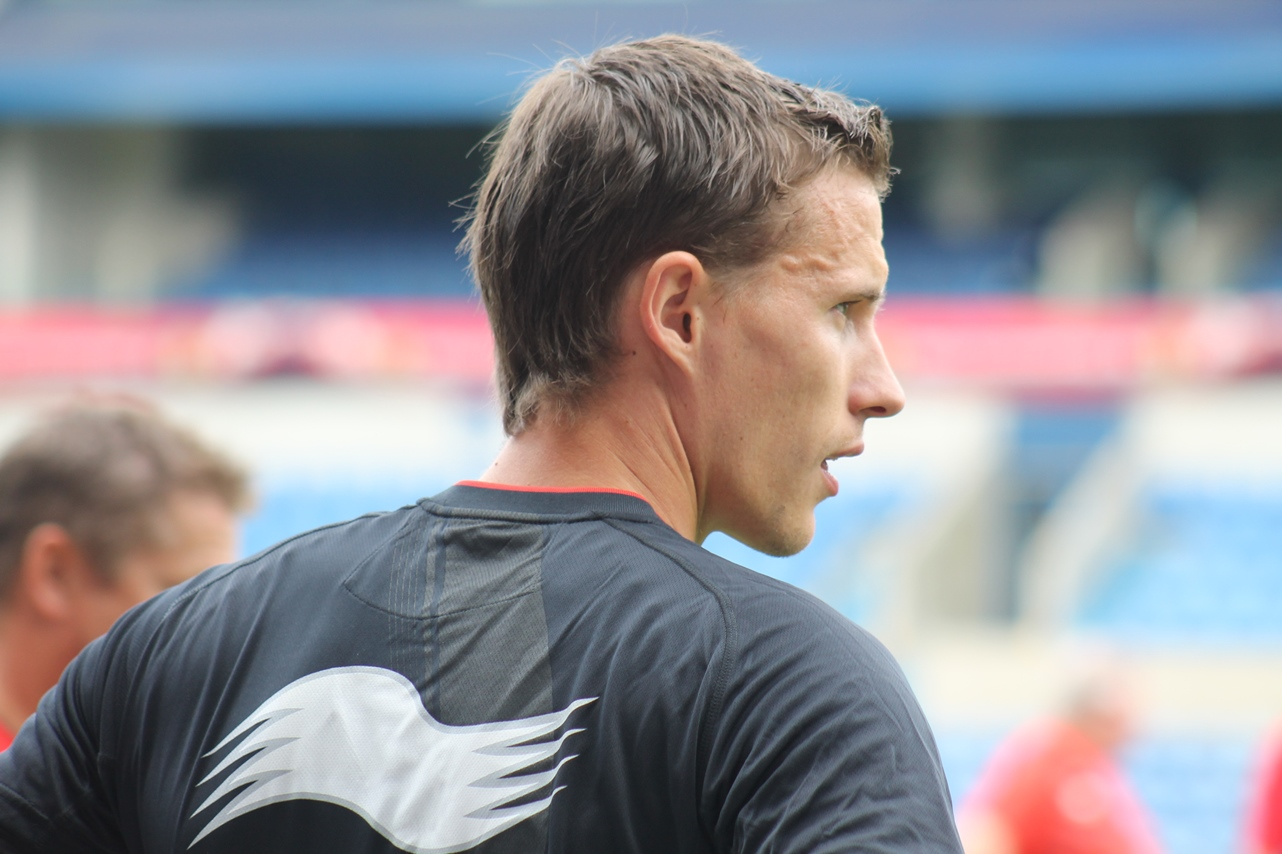
- Bossut in 2014

Personal information
- Full name: Sammy Andre Bossut
- Date of birth: 11 August 1985 (age 41)
- Place of birth: Tielt, Belgium
- Height: 1.87 m (6 ft 2 in)
- Position: Goalkeeper

Youth career
- 1993–1997: SC Oostrozebeke
- 1997–1999: Waregem
- 1999–2003: Ingelmunster

Senior career*
Years	Team	Apps	(Gls)
2003–2006	SW Ingelmunster-Harelbeke	8	(0)
2006–2023	Zulte Waregem	429	(0)
2023–2025	Harelbeke	34	(0)

International career
2014	Belgium XI	1	(0)
- * Club domestic league appearances and goals as of 3 July 2025

Sammy Andre Bossut (born 11 August 1985) is a Belgian retired footballer who played the majority of his career as a goalkeeper for Zulte Waregem.

== Club career ==
He was a first team surprise in the 2006–07 UEFA Cup return against Newcastle United in St James' Park.

At the end of the 2007–08 league season, Zulte Waregem chose not to prolong the contract of Geert De Vlieger, who was until then first choice goalkeeper. Bossut started the last matches of that season to gain more first team experience. Instead of signing a new goalkeeper, Bossut was awarded his spot in the starting eleven for the 2008–09 season.

In July 2023, Bossut returned to Harelbeke.

== International career ==
After Silvio Proto got injured, national manager Marc Wilmots called up Bossut as potential third goalkeeper for the Belgium national football team at the 2014 FIFA World Cup. Bossut played his first game with the national team against Luxembourg on 26 May 2014. Though considered official by the Royal Belgian Football Association, FIFA did not recognise the match as Wilmots made 7 substitutions while only 6 are allowed in international friendlies.

== Honours ==
Zulte Waregem

- Belgian Cup: 2016–17
