= Yady Bangoura =

Guinean footballer (born 1996)

Personal information
- Date of birth: 30 June 1996 (age 30)
- Place of birth: Coyah, Guinea
- Height: 1.86 m (6 ft 1 in)
- Position: Forward

Team information
- Current team: Tongeren
- Number: 81

Youth career
- 2013–2014: RAS Jodoigne
- 2014–2015: Arsenal Oplinter

Senior career*
Years	Team	Apps	(Gls)
2015–2016	Tienen	30	(13)
2016–2017	Geel	15	(5)
2017–2018	Union SG	0	(0)
2017–2018	→ Eendracht Aalst (loan)	18	(5)
2018–2020	RFC Liège	48	(28)
2020–2021	RWDM	6	(0)
2021	Patro Eisden	0	(0)
2021–2022	Thes	14	(3)
2022–2023	URSL Visé	8	(1)
2023	RAAL La Louvière	16	(4)
2023–2024	Union Namur	27	(8)
2024–2025	RAEC Mons	5	(0)
2025–	Tongeren	0	(0)

International career
2020–2021	Guinea	3	(1)
- * Club domestic league appearances and goals as of 13:13, 22 January 2026 (UTC)

Yady Bangoura (born 30 June 1996) is a Guinean professional footballer who plays as forward for Tongeren.

== Club career ==
Bangoura was born in Coyah, Guinea.

In summer 2017, Bangoura signed for Union SG on a one-year contract with an option for a further year.

After playing with various amateur teams in Belgium, Bangoura signed a professional contract with RWDM on 27 May 2020. He made his professional debut with RWDM in a 2–0 Belgian Second Division win over Club Brugge II on 22 August 2020.

On 12 January 2023, Bangoura joined Belgian National Division 1 club RAAL La Louvière.

== International career ==
Bangoura first represented the Guinea national team in a friendly 2–1 win over Cape Verde on 10 October 2020, scoring a goal in his debut.
