= Jérémy Perbet =

French footballer (born 1984)

- Perbet in 2016

Personal information
- Full name: Jérémy Louis Perbet
- Date of birth: 12 December 1984 (age 41)
- Place of birth: Le Puy-en-Velay, France
- Height: 1.84 m (6 ft 0 in)
- Position: Forward

Youth career
- Le Puy Foot 43

Senior career*
Years	Team	Apps	(Gls)
2003–2005	Clermont	60	(9)
2005–2006	Moulins	31	(23)
2006–2008	Strasbourg	7	(1)
2007	→ Charleroi (loan)	13	(6)
2007–2008	→ Angers SCO (loan)	11	(0)
2008–2010	Tubize	47	(24)
2010–2011	Lokeren	12	(1)
2011–2013	Mons	64	(51)
2013	→ Villarreal (loan)	18	(11)
2013–2014	Villarreal	26	(10)
2014–2016	İstanbul Başakşehir	22	(4)
2015–2016	→ Charleroi (loan)	33	(24)
2016–2017	Gent	27	(10)
2017–2018	Club Brugge	0	(0)
2017–2018	→ Kortrijk (loan)	29	(11)
2018–2020	Charleroi	37	(8)
2019–2020	→ OH Leuven (loan)	17	(5)
2020–2021	OH Leuven	2	(0)
2021–2023	RFC Liège	54	(40)
2023–2024	Sint-Eloois-Winkel	34	(12)
2024	Roeselare	0	(0)
2024	RCS Braine	0	(0)
- * Club domestic league appearances and goals as of 11:15, 1 May 2023 (UTC)

Jérémy Louis Perbet (born 12 December 1984) is a French professional footballer who plays as a forward. He is currently unemployed after most recently playing for RCS Braine in the Belgian Division 3.

== Career ==
=== Clermont and Moulins ===
Perbet was born in Le Puy-en-Velay, Haute-Loire. He finished his youth graduation with his hometown's Le Puy Foot 43 Auvergne, joining Ligue 2 side Clermont Foot in the summer of 2003. On 2 August 2003, he made his professional debut, playing the last ten minutes in a 0–0 home draw against FC Rouen; his first professional goal came on 27 September, netting the game's only in a home success over FC Gueugnon. Perbet finished his first season with 26 league appearances and 4 goals.

In the 2004–05 season, Clermont finished 18th, only one point above relegation, and despite the club reaching the quarter-finals in both Coupe de la Ligue and Coupe de France, Perbet's contribution was limited, only finding the net five times in 32 matches, rarely being a starter.

In August 2005, after appearing two times for Clermont during the season, Perbet joined Championnat National side AS Moulins. He found a goalscoring touch during his one-season spell at the Auvergne side, scoring 23 goals in only 31 appearances, and finishing the season as a top scorer alongside Jawad El Hajri of US Boulogne. Despite Perbet's contribution, Moulins finished the season 19th and was relegated.

=== Strasbourg and loans ===
On 30 May 2006, Perbet joined RC Strasbourg in a three-year deal. He made his debut in a pre-season friendly against Bayern Munich, netting the last of a 2–0 success. However, he was sparingly used during the campaign (seven games, one goal), and was assigned to the reserves in the fourth division.

On 5 January 2007, Perbet moved to Charleroi on loan until the end of the season. After helping the Belgian side finish 5th by scoring six goals in 13 matches, he returned to his parent club, freshly promoted to Ligue 1. On 14 July, Perbet joined Angers SCO, also in a temporary deal. After only appearing 11 times and without scoring, he returned to Strasbourg. In January 2008, due to Perbet's limited playing time, he was linked with a move to Austrian Bundesliga team Rapid Wien; however, nothing came of it.

=== Belgium ===
On 8 July 2008, Perbet moved to Belgian Pro League side Tubize. In his first season he scored 13 goals in 31 appearances, but could not prevent his side's relegation; in his second, Perbet maintained his goalscoring touch, netting 11 goals in 16 matches.

On 7 January 2010, Perbet moved back to the top level, signing a two-and-a-half-year deal with Lokeren for a rumored €350,000 fee. He appeared ten times in 2009–10, scoring against Mechelen on 17 April. In late July, Perbet suffered a knee injury which left him sidelined for some of the 2010–11 season.

On 5 January 2011, Perbet joined Mons on loan until the end of the season. He was a key offensive unit during the promotion campaign, scoring 14 goals in 14 matches. On 3 August, he signed a three-year permanent deal with Mons, netting a career-best 28 goals (22 in the league, including a hat-trick against Sint-Truiden on 13 August) during the season.

=== Villarreal ===
On 25 January 2013, Perbet moved teams and countries again, joining Villarreal CF on loan until the end of the season. He made his debut on 9 February, starting and scoring twice in a 3–0 home win over SD Ponferradina. He finished the season with 11 goals in 18 matches, as the Amarillos returned to La Liga at first attempt.

On 7 July, Villarreal exercised the buyout option and signed Perbet until 2016, for a rumoured €1.4 million fee. He made his debut in the Spanish top flight on 24 August, playing the entire second half in a 2–1 home success over Real Valladolid; his first top flight goal came seven days later, the first of a 3–0 win at CA Osasuna.

=== Istanbul Başakşehir ===
On 8 July 2014, Perbet signed a three-year deal with İstanbul Başakşehir, freshly promoted to Süper Lig.

=== RFC Liège ===
Perbet joined RFC Liège on a two-year contract in 2021.
