= Amara Baby =

Senegalese footballer (born 1989)

Personal information
- Date of birth: 23 February 1989 (age 37)
- Place of birth: Le Blanc-Mesnil, France
- Height: 1.83 m (6 ft 0 in)
- Position: Midfielder

Youth career
- Châteauroux

Senior career*
Years	Team	Apps	(Gls)
2008–2014	Châteauroux	87	(8)
2012–2013	→ Le Mans (loan)	32	(1)
2013–2014	→ Laval (loan)	25	(6)
2014–2015	Auxerre	25	(7)
2015–2018	Charleroi	99	(16)
2018–2020	Antwerp	33	(3)
2020–2021	Eupen	24	(2)

International career^{‡}
2015–	Senegal	1	(0)
- * Club domestic league appearances and goals as of 10:54, 27 April 2021 (UTC) ‡ National team caps and goals as of 17 April 2018

Amara Baby (born 23 February 1989) is a Senegalese professional footballer who plays as a midfielder.

== Club career ==
On 8 June 2020, Baby completed a free transfer from Antwerp to Eupen.

== International career ==
Born in France, Baby is Senegalese by descent. He made his international debut for the Senegal national football team in a 3–1 2017 Africa Cup of Nations qualification win over Burundi on 13 June 2015.
