= Chris O'Loughlin (football manager) =

Irish association football coach (born 1978)

Personal information
- Date of birth: 6 August 1978 (age 48)
- Place of birth: Limerick, Ireland

Team information
- Current team: Royal Union SG (Sporting Director)

Senior career*
Years	Team	Apps	(Gls)
- Cliftonville
- Larne

Managerial career
- 2007: Orlando Pirates (assistant)
- 2008: Supersport United (academy)
- 2009: AS Vita
- 2011: AS Vita
- 2012: Melbourne Victory (assistant)
- 2013–2015: Sint-Truiden (assistant)
- 2015–2016: Sint-Truiden
- 2016–2017: Charlton Athletic (assistant)
- 2017–2018: Sint-Truiden (assistant)
- 2017: → Sint-Truiden (caretaker)
- 2018–2019: Kortrijk (assistant)
- 2019–present: Union Saint-Gilloise (Sporting Director)
- * Club domestic league appearances and goals

Chris O'Loughlin (born 6 August 1978) is a professional football coach born in Limerick, Ireland.

== Career ==
O'Loughlin played for Cliftonville reserves and Larne in Northern Ireland.

O'Loughlin, who had lived for much of his childhood in South Africa, started his coaching career as an assistant coach with the Orlando Pirates in 2007. In 2008, he became an academy coach for Supersport United. In 2009, he was named head coach of the Democratic Republic of Congo club AS Vita and brought them to the quarter-final of the CAF Cup. He came back to AS Vita for the 2011 season and qualified them for the CAF Champions League. In 2012, he was named assistant coach of the Melbourne Victory by Jim Magilton. For the 2013–14 season he was appointed as assistant coach of K. Sint-Truidense V.V. to head coach Yannick Ferrera in Belgium. In June 2014 his contract was extended by the club for another season up to June 2015.

O'Loughlin was appointed manager of Sint-Truiden in September 2015, after Ferrera moved to manage Standard Liège. He was replaced by Ivan Leko at the end of the 2015–16 season. He joined the coaching staff at Charlton Athletic F.C. in December 2016 and was named as first team coach until the end of the 2016–17 season.

On 24 May 2019, Royale Union Saint-Gilloise confirmed that O'Loughlin had joined the club as the new sporting director.

As Sporting Director, O’Loughlin guided RUSG to promotion to the top tier of Belgian football in the 2020/2021 season.

The 2021/2022 season would see RUSG finish top of the league, dominating the division, and the first team in the history of the championship to top the league after being promoted the previous year.
