= 2016–17 Belgian Cup =

Tournament details
- Country: Belgium
- Dates: 30 July 2016 – 18 March 2017
- Teams: 312

Final positions
- Champions: Zulte Waregem (2nd title)
- Runners-up: Oostende

The 2016–17 Belgian Cup, called the Croky Cup for sponsorship reasons, is the 62nd season of Belgium's annual football cup competition. The competition began on 30 July 2016 and is scheduled to end with the final in March 2017. The winners of the competition will qualify for the 2017–18 UEFA Europa League Group Stage. Standard Liège were the defending champions, but were eliminated in the 6th round by ASV Geel.

== Competition format ==
The competition consists of ten rounds. Except for the semi-finals, all rounds are single-match elimination rounds. When tied after 90 minutes in the first three rounds, penalties are taken immediately. In rounds four to seven and the quarterfinals, when tied after 90 minutes first an extra time period of 30 minutes are played, then penalties are taken if still necessary. The semi-finals will be played over two legs, where the team winning on aggregate advances. The final will be played as a single match.

Teams enter the competition in different rounds, based upon their 2016–17 league affiliation. Teams from the fifth-level Belgian Third Amateur Division or lower began in round 1. Belgian Second Amateur Division teams entered in round 2, Belgian First Amateur Division teams entered in round 3, Belgian First Division B teams in round 5 and finally the Belgian First Division A teams enter in round 6.

| Round | Clubs remaining | Clubs involved | Winners from previous round | New entries this round | Leagues entering at this round |
|---|---|---|---|---|---|
| Round 1 | 312 | 224 | none | 224 | Belgian Third Amateur Division and Belgian Provincial Leagues |
| Round 2 | 200 | 160 | 112 | 48 | Belgian Second Amateur Division |
| Round 3 | 120 | 96 | 80 | 16 | Belgian First Amateur Division |
| Round 4 | 72 | 48 | 48 | none | none |
| Round 5 | 48 | 32 | 24 | 8 | Belgian First Division B |
| Round 6 | 32 | 32 | 16 | 16 | Belgian First Division A |
| Round 7 | 16 | 16 | 16 | none | none |
| Quarter-Finals | 8 | 8 | 8 | none | none |
| Semi-Finals | 4 | 4 | 4 | none | none |
| Final | 2 | 2 | 2 | none | none |

== Round and draw dates ==
The schedule is as follows.

| Round | Draw date | Match date |
|---|---|---|
| First Round | 26 June 2016 | 30 and 31 July 2016 |
| Second Round | 26 June 2016 | 6 and 7 August 2016 |
| Third Round | 26 June 2016 | 13 and 14 August 2016 |
| Fourth Round | 26 June 2016 | 20 and 21 August 2016 |
| Fifth Round | 26 June 2016 | 26, 27 and 28 August 2016 |
| Sixth Round | 29 August 2016 | 20 and 21 September 2016 |
| Seventh Round | 21 September 2016 | 29 November 2016 to 1 December 2016 |
| Quarter-finals | 1 December 2016 | 13 and 14 December 2016 |
| Semi-finals | 14 December 2016 | Leg 1: 17 January 2017 |
| Semi-finals | 14 December 2016 | Leg 2: 1 February 2017 |
| Final | 14 December 2016 | 18 March 2017 |

== First round ==
This round of matches was played on 30 & 31 July 2016 and includes teams playing in the Belgian Third Amateur Division and Belgian Provincial Leagues. Teams from the Belgian Third Amateur Division were seeded and could not play each other.

Four teams from the lowest division at level nine of the Belgian football pyramid participated, namely Hermalienne, Lacs de l'eau d'heure, Negenmanneke and Pulle. These all got eliminated.

| Tie | Home team (tier) | Score | Away team (tier) |
| 1 | Francs Borains (5) | 2–1 | Montkainoise (6) |
| 2 | Paturageois (6) | 3–3 (5–4 p) | Eendracht Wervik (5) |
| 3 | Westkapelle (6) | 2–2 (4–5 p) | OMS Ingelmunster (5) |
| 4 | Kanegem (8) | 0–8 | Tournai (5) |
| 5 | Vlamertinge (5) | 1–3 | Lauwe (6) |
| 6 | RUS Beloeil (6) | 1–1 (3–1 p) | Eernegem (6) |
| 7 | Péruwelz (6) | 5–0 | Olympic Warcoing (8) |
| 8 | Kortemark (6) | 1–1 (5–4 p) | SVV Damme (6) |
| 9 | Estaimbourg (7) | 1–2 | Rumbeke (6) |
| 10 | Sassport Boezinge (6) | 2–1 | Zwevegem (7) |
| 11 | Wingene (6) | 0–0 (4–1 p) | Oostnieuwkerke (6) |
| 12 | Loppem (8) | 1–4 | Antoinien (7) |
| 13 | Racing Waregem (6) | 5–1 | USG Tertre-Hautrage (6) |
| 14 | Wielsbeke (6) | 4–0 | Lauwe (6) |
| 15 | Oostduinkerke (6) | 2–3 | Oostkamp (6) |
| 16 | SV Kortrijk (8) | 4–0 | Neufvilloise (7) |
| 17 | Havelange (7) | 1–4 | Tamines (5) |
| 18 | Jumet (7) | 0–3 | Solrezienne (5) |
| 19 | Anderlues (7) | 0–0 (5–6 p) | Profondeville (5) |
| 20 | Aische (5) | 1–0 | Conruzien (7) |
| 21 | Courcelles (6) | 0–4 | Onhaye (5) |
| 22 | Manage (5) | 1–0 | Assesse (6) |
| 23 | Rochefort (6) | 1–0 | Quevy-Mons (5) |
| 24 | Lacs de l'eau d'heure (9) | 1–5 | Beauraing 61 A (7) |
| 25 | Grand-Leez (6) | 1–3 | Gerpinnes (7) |
| 26 | Nismes (6) | 1–2 | Ransartoise B (8) |
| 27 | Houdinois (6) | 3–0 | Floreffe (8) |
| 28 | Beauraing 61 B (8) | 2–2 (1–3 p) | Flavion Sport (6) |
| 29 | Andenne (6) | 2–2 (3–4 p) | Fosses (6) |
| 30 | ES de la Molignée (6) | 2–5 | Thudinienne (7) |
| 31 | Stade Gedinnois (7) | 2–0 | Ligny (6) |
| 32 | Flawinne (7) | 0–3 | Saint-Hadelin Haversin (7) |
| 33 | Lebbeke (5) | 3–0 | Melsele (6) |
| 34 | Bambrugge (6) | 2–2 (3–4 p) | Lede (5) |
| 35 | Ninove (5) | 7–1 | Adegem (7) |
| 36 | Stekene (6) | 0–3 | Sint-Lenaarts (5) |
| 37 | Oudenhove (8) | 2–5 | Sint-Gillis Waas (5) |
| 38 | Berlare (5) | 3–0 | Kruibeke (6) |
| 39 | Elene-Grotenberge (6) | 1–5 | Wetteren-Kwatrecht (5) |
| 40 | Zele (5) | 6–2 | Merendree (7) |
| 41 | Maldegem (6) | 0–3 | Merelbeke (5) |
| 42 | Ronse (5) | 1–0 | Lovendegem (6) |
| 43 | Voorde (6) | 1–1 (2–4 p) | Dikkelvenne (5) |
| 44 | Drongen (7) | 10–1 | Asse-Terheide (8) |
| 45 | Belzele (7) | 1–4 | Eine (7) |
| 46 | Aalter (6) | 2–1 | Appelterre-Eichem (6) |
| 47 | Kemzeke (6) | 4–0 | Zelzate (6) |
| 48 | De Pinte (7) | 0–1 | Lochristi (6) |
| 49 | Diest (5) | 4–1 | Stade Everois (7) |
| 50 | Rebecq (5) | 5–0 | Huldenberg (7) |
| 51 | Betekom (5) | 3–3 (4–2 p) | Braine (6) |
| 52 | Machelen (7) | 2–2 (6–5 p) | Diegem Sport (5) |
| 53 | Ways-Genappe (7) | 0–5 | Wolvertem Merchtem (5) |
| 54 | Waterloo (5) | 1–0 | Melsbroek (7) |
| 55 | Roosbeek (8) | 1–4 | Léopold (5) |
| 56 | Aarschot (7) | 3–0 | Sterrebeek (5) |

| Tie | Home team (tier) | Score | Away team (tier) |
| 57 | Tremelo (8) | 1–1 (4–5 p) | Ganshoren (5) |
| 58 | Pepingen (5) | 5–0 | Negenmanneke (9) |
| 59 | Eppegem (5) | 5–1 | Ophain (8) |
| 60 | RWDM47 (5) | 2–1 | Wambeek (7) |
| 61 | Wolfsdonk Sport (7) | 0–1 | Racing Jet Wavre (5) |
| 62 | Saint-Michel (8) | 0–5 | Stockel B (7) |
| 63 | Zuun (8) | 0–1 | Etterbeek (7) |
| 64 | Beigem (8) | 2–2 (4–5 p) | Ixelles (7) |
| 65 | Huy (5) | 1–0 | Geer (7) |
| 66 | Cointe-Liège A (5) | 3–1 | Ougrée (7) |
| 67 | Cointe-Liège B (8) | 2–4 | Herstal (5) |
| 68 | Strée (7) | 1–2 | Richelle (5) |
| 69 | Seraing Athlétique (7) | 0–0 (2–4 p) | Warnant (5) |
| 70 | Verlaine (5) | 3–1 (Note: Match played on the pitch of Andrimont.) | Andrimont (7) |
| 71 | Tilleur (5) | 8–0 | Étoile Verviétoise (8) |
| 72 | Weywertz (6) | 4–1 | Chênéenne (7) |
| 73 | Beaufays B (7) | 2–0 | Milanello Milmort (6) |
| 74 | Eupen 1963 (7) | 5–2 | Hermalienne (9) |
| 75 | Union Rutten (8) | 1–2 | Stade Disonais (6) |
| 76 | URSL Visé (6) (Note: Originally URS Lixhe-Lanaye was drawn against Ster-Francorchamps, but they merged with CS Visé to become URSL Visé) | 6–1 | Ster-Francorchamps (7) |
| 77 | Jeunesse Lorraine Arlonaise (5) | 2–1 | Marloie Sport (6) |
| 78 | Sibret (7) | 1–1 (4–3 p) | Longlier (5) |
| 79 | Mormont (5) | 0–1 | Ethe Belmont (6) |
| 80 | Durbuy (5) | 2–1 | Gouvy (7) |
| 81 | Compogne Bertogne (8) | 0–4 | Bertrix (5) |
| 82 | Meix-Devant-Virton (6) | 0–0 (2–4 p) | Aywaille (5) |
| 83 | Libramont (6) | 2–1 | Habaysienne (7) |
| 84 | Wellinoise (6) | 0–1 | Habay-La-Neuve (6) |
| 85 | Champlonaise (6) | 4–0 | Saint-Pierre (8) |
| 86 | Rochois (6) | 3–1 | Nothomb-Post (7) |
| 87 | Bercheux (7) | 1–3 | Florenvillois (6) |
| 88 | Harzé (8) | 0–0 (11–10 p) | Freylangeoise (6) |
| 89 | Meeuwen (7) | 0–3 | Helson Helchteren (5) |
| 90 | Esperanza Pelt (5) | 1–0 | Zepperen-Brustem (6) |
| 91 | Herk-De-Stad (6) | 0–4 | Wellen (5) |
| 92 | Zonhoven (6) | 0–3 | Leopoldsburg (5) |
| 93 | Opitter (8) | 2–1 | Gestel (8) |
| 94 | Peerder Sportvrienden (8) | 1–3 | Witgoor Sport Dessel (7) |
| 95 | Herselt (7) | 1–5 | Bilzerse Waltwilder (6) |
| 96 | Vlijtingen (6) | 2–0 | Zonhoven (6) |
| 97 | Beekhoek Sport (7) | 1–1 (5–6 p) | Bolderberg (8) |
| 98 | Weerstand Koersel (7) | 3–1 | Grimbie 69 (7) |
| 99 | Eendracht Termien (6) | 6–1 | Thor Hasselt (7) |
| 100 | Heur-Tongeren (6) | 2–0 | Lutlommel (6) |
| 101 | Turnhout (5) | 4–1 | Lyra (6) |
| 102 | Racing Mechelen (5) | 1–3 | Schriek (6) |
| 103 | Lille (6) | 2–1 | Nijlen (5) |
| 104 | Katelijne (6) | 2–0 | City Pirates Antwerpen (5) |
| 105 | Vosselaar (5) | 6–2 | Willebroek (8) |
| 106 | Minderhout (7) | 1–4 | Mariekerke (5) |
| 107 | Linda Olen (7) | 2–5 | Houtvenne (5) |
| 108 | Brasschaat (6) | 1–3 | Mariaburg (7) |
| 109 | Retie Branddonk (6) | 4–0 | Pulle (9) |
| 110 | Wavria (7) | 2–2 (3–4 p) | Ekeren (8) |
| 111 | Ternesse Wommelgem (6) | 1–3 | Zwijndrecht (6) |
| 112 | Antonia (6) | 2–1 | Dosko Baarle-Hertog (8) |

== Second round ==
The lowest ranked clubs still in the tournament were six teams from the third provincial level (level 8), of which only Ransartoise B managed to progress.

| Tie | Home team (tier) | Score | Away team (tier) |
| 113 | Tienen (4) | 2–0 | Florenvillois (6) |
| 114 | Hoogstraten (4) | 5–3 | Leopoldsburg (5) |
| 115 | Wolvertem Merchtem (5) | 2–1 | Solières Sport (4) |
| 116 | Opitter (8) | 1–3 | Sportkring Sint-Niklaas (4) |
| 117 | Warnant (5) | 1–3 | RFC Liège (4) |
| 118 | Givry (4) | 4–1 | Stade Gedinnois (7) |
| 119 | Zwijndrecht (6) | 1–2 | Spouwen-Mopertingen (4) |
| 120 | Sibret (7) | 1–7 | Eendracht Aalst (4) |
| 121 | Turnhout (5) | 1–1 (8–7 p) | Grimbergen (4) |
| 122 | Charleroi Couillet Fleurus (4) | 2–1 | Houtvenne (5) |
| 123 | Torhout (4) | 3–1 | Aywaille (5) |
| 124 | Tessenderlo (4) | 1–1 (2–3 p) | Eupen 1963 (7) |
| 125 | Tamines (5) | 2–2 (4–5 p) | Tempo Overijse (4) |
| 126 | Bornem (4) | 1–1 (3–5 p) | RUS Beloeil (6) |
| 127 | Bolderberg (7) | 1–2 | La Louvière Centre (4) |
| 128 | Waremme (4) | 10–1 | Libramont (6) |
| 129 | Châtelet (4) | 2–0 | Zele (5) |
| 130 | Menen (4) | 3–1 | Wingene (6) |
| 131 | Heur-Tongeren (6) | 4–0 | Rupel Boom (4) |
| 132 | Lauwe (6) | 2–4 | Hades (4) |
| 133 | Union La Calamine (4) | 0–1 | Aische (5) |
| 134 | Flavion Sport (6) | 0–6 | Izegem (4) |
| 135 | Francs Borains (5) | 4–1 | Duffel (4) |
| 136 | Olsa Brakel (4) | 4–1 | Rochefort (6) |
| 137 | Etterbeek (7) | 0–8 (Note: The game was played at the ground of Walhain.) | Walhain (4) |
| 138 | Stockel B (7) | 0–6 | Sint-Eloois-Winkel (4) |
| 139 | Mariekerke (5) | 0–1 | Westhoek (4) |
| 140 | Ciney (4) | 2–1 | Ninove (5) |
| 141 | Harelbeke (4) | 7–1 | SV Kortrijk (8) |
| 142 | Hamoir (4) | 5–0 | Ekeren (8) |
| 143 | Diest (5) | 1–1 (2–4 p) | Halle (4) |
| 144 | Olympic Charleroi (4) | 0–3 | Wetteren-Kwatrecht (5) |
| 145 | Londerzeel (4) | 1–1 (5–4 p) | Vosselaar (5) |
| 146 | Saint-Hadelin Haversin (7) | 0–3 | Namur (4) |
| 147 | Racing Waregem (6) | 2–1 | Olympia Wijgmaal (4) |
| 148 | Beauraing 61 A (7) | 0–0 (5–6 p) | Woluwe-Zaventem (4) |
| 149 | Sparta Petegem (4) | 1–0 | Herstal (5) |
| 150 | Antoinien (7) | 1–1 (4–5 p) | Zwarte Leeuw (4) |
| 151 | Acren Lessines (4) | 3–1 | Wielsbeke (6) |
| 152 | Gullegem (4) | 0–1 | Helson Helchteren (5) |

| Tie | Home team (tier) | Score | Away team (tier) |
| 153 | Cointe-Liège A (5) | 2–7 | Knokke (4) |
| 154 | Profondeville (5) | 0–2 | Meux (4) |
| 155 | Berchem Sport (4) | 0–1 | Sint-Gillis Waas (5) |
| 156 | Temse (4) | 2–2 (4–2 p) | Onhaye (5) |
| 157 | Machelen (7) | 0–9 | Gent-Zeehaven (4) |
| 158 | Couvin-Mariembourg (4) | 7–1 | Witgoor Sport Dessel (7) |
| 159 | Bocholt (4) | 10–0 | Harzé (8) |
| 160 | Drongen (7) | 0–3 | Cappellen (4) |
| 161 | Jeunesse Lorraine Arlonaise (5) | 0–4 | Durbuy (5) |
| 162 | Oostkamp (6) | 2–2 (3–4 p) | Rebecq (5) |
| 163 | Tournai (5) | 0–2 | Lochristi (6) |
| 164 | Gerpinnes (7) | 1–3 | URSL Visé (6) |
| 165 | Solrezienne (5) | 1–3 | Waterloo (6) |
| 166 | Ronse (5) | 4–1 | Weerstand Koersel (7) |
| 167 | Lede (5) | 2–1 | Léopold (5) |
| 168 | Verlaine (5) | 1–0 | Eendracht Termien (6) |
| 169 | RWDM47 (5) | 2–0 | Dikkelvenne (5) |
| 170 | Weywertz (6) | 1–1 (14–13 p) | Aarschot (6) |
| 171 | Wellen (5) | 2–0 | Bertrix (5) |
| 172 | Vlijtingen (6) | 2–0 | Stade Disonais (6) |
| 173 | Rumbeke (6) | 1–2 | Betekom (5) |
| 174 | Kemzeke (6) | 0–5 | Paturageois (6) |
| 175 | Tilleur (5) | 1–3 | Ingelmunster (5) |
| 176 | Beaufays B (7) | 1–4 | Sassport Boezinge (6) |
| 177 | Pepingen (5) | 1–1 (4–5 p) | Katelijne (6) |
| 178 | Richelle (5) | 1–0 | Kortemark (6) |
| 179 | Champlonaise (6) | 1–2 | Bilzerse Waltwilder (6) |
| 180 | Manage (5) | 1–2 | Merelbeke (5) |
| 181 | Fosses (6) | 1–4 | Antonia (6) |
| 182 | Berlare (5) | 4–0 | Rochois (6) |
| 183 | Esperanza Pelt (5) | 1–1 (5–4 p) | Eppegem (5) |
| 184 | Lebbeke (5) | 2–0 | Aalter (6) |
| 185 | Ganshoren (5) | 2–0 | Racing Jet Wavre (5) |
| 186 | Huy (5) | 1–3 | Sint-Lenaarts (5) |
| 187 | Ixelles (7) | 1–3 | Houdinois (6) |
| 188 | Schriek (6) | 3–1 | Eine (7) |
| 189 | Ethe Belmont (6) | 3–0 | Péruwelz (6) |
| 190 | Mariaburg (7) | 1–6 | Lille (6) |
| 191 | Retie Branddonk (6) | 0–3 | Habay-La-Neuve (6) |
| 192 | Thudinienne (7) | 0–3 | Ransartoise B (8) |

== Third round ==
Ransartoise B was the lowest ranked team still in the tournament at this point being the only team from level 8, but they got eliminated by Ingelmunster.

| Tie | Home team (tier) | Score | Away team (tier) |
| 193 | Antonia (6) | 0–3 | Hamme (3) |
| 194 | Tienen (4) | 0–0 (3–4 p) | Dender EH (3) |
| 195 | Virton (3) | 0–0 (3–4 p) | Torhout (4) |
| 196 | Sprimont-Comblain (3) | 2–1 | Ciney (4) |
| 197 | ASV Geel (3) | 2–0 | URSL Visé (6) |
| 198 | Weywertz (6) | 0–3 | WS Brussels (3) |
| 199 | Turnhout (5) | 2–1 | Heist (3) |
| 200 | Bilzerse Waltwilder (6) | 0–3 | Seraing (3) |
| 201 | Deinze (3) | 2–0 | Richelle (5) |
| 202 | Merelbeke (5) | 1–1 (3–5 p) | Oudenaarde (3) |
| 203 | Ganshoren (5) | 1–4 | Sporting Hasselt (3) |
| 204 | Hades (4) | 1–2 | Patro Eisden Maasmechelen (3) |
| 205 | Coxyde (3) | 0–6 | Londerzeel (4) |
| 206 | Beerschot Wilrijk (3) | 2–0 | Châtelet (4) |
| 207 | Westhoek (4) | 1–2 | Dessel Sport (3) |
| 208 | Walhain (4) | 1–2 | Oosterzonen Oosterwijk (3) |
| 209 | Olsa Brakel (4) | 3–3 (3–4 p) | Hoogstraten (4) |
| 210 | Sint-Lenaarts (5) | 1–0 | RUS Beloeil (6) |
| 211 | Aische (5) | 1–3 | Charleroi Couillet Fleurus (4) |
| 212 | Ingelmunster (5) | 0–0 (4–2 p) | Ransartoise B (8) |
| 213 | Katelijne (6) | 3–2 | Heur-Tongeren (6) |
| 214 | Vlijtingen (6) | 3–0 | Habay-La-Neuve (6) |
| 215 | Sportkring Sint-Niklaas (4) | 4–1 | La Louvière Centre (4) |
| 216 | Rebecq (5) | 4–1 | Schriek (6) |

| Tie | Home team (tier) | Score | Away team (tier) |
| 217 | Wetteren-Kwatrecht (5) | 1–1 (6–5 p) | Wellen (5) |
| 218 | Houdinois (6) | 0–4 | Ronse (5) |
| 219 | RFC Liège (4) | 1–2 | Eendracht Aalst (4) |
| 220 | Lille (6) | 5–5 (4–5 p) | Spouwen-Mopertingen (4) |
| 221 | Durbuy (5) | 0–1 | Racing Waregem (6) |
| 222 | Sint-Gillis Waas (5) | 1–2 | Helson Helchteren (4) |
| 223 | Ethe Belmont (6) | 0–2 | Givry (4) |
| 224 | Knokke (4) | 3–2 | Sparta Petegem (4) |
| 225 | Verlaine (5) | 1–2 | Harelbeke (4) |
| 226 | Namur (4) | 2–2 (3–0 p) | Menen (4) |
| 227 | Esperanza Pelt (5) | 1–5 | Couvin-Mariembourg (4) |
| 228 | Waremme (4) | 3–0 | Lede (5) |
| 229 | Paturageois (6) | 2–0 | Wolvertem Merchtem (5) |
| 230 | Tempo Overijse (4) | 4–1 | Temse (4) |
| 231 | Zwarte Leeuw (4) | 0–0 (4–3 p) | Izegem (4) |
| 232 | Woluwe-Zaventem (4) | 0–0 (1–3 p) | Lochristi (6) |
| 233 | Gent-Zeehaven (4) | 3–3 (2–4 p) | Sint-Eloois-Winkel (4) |
| 234 | Waterloo (5) | 1–3 | Bocholt (4) |
| 235 | Betekom (5) | 1–3 | Lebbeke (5) |
| 236 | Eupen 1963 (7) | 0–4 | Meux (4) |
| 237 | Cappellen (4) | 3–0 | Hamoir (4) |
| 238 | Sassport Boezinge (6) | 1–4 | Acren Lessines (4) |
| 239 | Berlare (5) | 0–2 | Halle (4) |
| 240 | Francs Borains (5) | 4–1 | RWDM47 (5) |

== Fourth round ==
The lowest ranked clubs in this round were five teams from level 6, namely Katelijne, Lochristi, Paturageois, Racing Waregem and Vlijtingen. They all failed to progress.

| Tie | Home team (tier) | Score | Away team (tier) |
| 241 | Rebecq (5) | 2–0 | Couvin-Mariembourg (4) |
| 242 | Katelijne (6) | 2–4 | Cappellen (4) |
| 243 | Ingelmunster (5) | 1–2 | Sint-Eloois-Winkel (4) |
| 244 | Beerschot Wilrijk (3) | 3–3 (4–1 p) | Hamme (3) |
| 245 | Racing Waregem (6) | 0–3 | Eendracht Aalst (4) |
| 246 | Helson Helchteren (5) | 3–3 (4–2 p) | Ronse (5) |
| 247 | Deinze (3) | 2–2 (4–3 p) | Wetteren-Kwatrecht (5) |
| 248 | Hoogstraten (4) | 0–3 (a.e.t.) | Dessel Sport (3) |
| 249 | Lochristi (6) | 1–4 (a.e.t.) | Charleroi Couillet Fleurus (4) |
| 250 | Zwarte Leeuw (4) | 1–0 | Sint-Lenaarts (5) |
| 251 | Waremme (4) | 3–2 | Knokke (4) |
| 252 | Torhout (4) | 1–2 (a.e.t.) | Francs Borains (5) |

| Tie | Home team (tier) | Score | Away team (tier) |
| 253 | Spouwen-Mopertingen (4) | 2–3 | Harelbeke (4) |
| 254 | Givry (4) | 0–1 | Oudenaarde (3) |
| 255 | ASV Geel (3) | 3–2 (a.e.t.) | Acren Lessines (4) |
| 256 | WS Brussels (3) | 0–1 | Patro Eisden Maasmechelen (3) |
| 257 | Dender EH (3) | 2–3 | Turnhout (5) |
| 258 | Meux (5) | 4–3 | Halle (4) |
| 259 | Namur (4) | 0–2 | Sprimont-Comblain (3) |
| 260 | Vlijtingen (6) | 1–2 | Oosterzonen Oosterwijk (3) |
| 261 | Paturageois (6) | 0–3 | Sporting Hasselt (3) |
| 262 | Sportkring Sint-Niklaas (4) | 2–0 | Tempo Overijse (4) |
| 263 | Bocholt (4) | 2–1 | Seraing (3) |
| 264 | Lebbeke (5) | 0–1 | Londerzeel (4) |

== Fifth Round ==
Four teams from the Belgian Third Amateur Division (level 5) had managed to progress to this round but were all eliminated at this point: Francs Borains, Helchteren, Rebecq and Turnhout.

| Tie | Home team (tier) | Score | Away team (tier) |
| 265 | Beerschot Wilrijk (3) | 1–2 | Cercle Brugge (2) |
| 266 | Antwerp (2) | 4–1 | Zwarte Leeuw (4) |
| 267 | Deinze (3) | 1–3 | Lommel United (2) |
| 268 | Francs Borains (5) | 0–4 | Tubize (2) |
| 269 | Londerzeel (4) | 1–2 | Roeselare (2) |
| 270 | Waremme (4) | 2–8 | Lierse (2) |
| 271 | Rebecq (5) | 1–1 (3–5 p) | Oud-Heverlee Leuven (2) |
| 272 | Oosterzonen Oosterwijk (3) | 3–2 | Union SG (2) |

| Tie | Home team (tier) | Score | Away team (tier) |
| 273 | Sprimont-Comblain (3) | 2–2 (7–6 p) | Turnhout (5) |
| 274 | Sportkring Sint-Niklaas (4) | 0–1 | Sporting Hasselt (3) |
| 275 | Patro Eisden Maasmechelen (3) | 0–6 | Dessel Sport (3) |
| 276 | Charleroi Couillet Fleurus (4) | 0–2 | Harelbeke (4) |
| 277 | Bocholt (4) | 4–2 | Oudenaarde (3) |
| 278 | Helson Helchteren (5) | 1–2 | Eendracht Aalst (4) |
| 279 | Sint-Eloois-Winkel (4) | 0–1 | ASV Geel (3) |
| 280 | Meux (5) | 4–5 | Cappellen (4) |

== Sixth Round ==
The sixth round saw the entry of the Belgian First Division A teams. The matches were played on 20 and 21 September 2016.

| 20 September 2016 | Club Brugge | 3–1 | Lommel United (2) | Bruges |
| 20:00 | Vormer 38'; Gedoz 45+2'; Limbombe 63' | Report | Adesanya 26' | Stadium: Jan Breydel Stadium |

| 20 September 2016 | Dessel Sport (3) | 3–3 (a.e.t.) (7–8 p) | Excel Mouscron | Dessel |
| 20:30 | Njengo 24'; Dreesen 90+1'; Breugelmans 112' | Report | Simić 19'; Marković 55'; Trézéguet 110' | Stadium: Armand Melisstadion |
| | Penalties |
| | Janssens (penalty scored); Jutten (penalty scored); Smet (penalty scored); Njengo (penalty scored); Boiten (penalty missed); Breugelmans (penalty scored); Tilburgs (penalty scored); Dreesen (penalty scored); Remen (penalty missed) | | (penalty scored) Simić; (penalty scored) Hubert; (penalty missed) Marković; (penalty scored) Mohamed; (penalty scored) Stojanović; (penalty scored) Diedhiou; (penalty scored) Vojvoda; (penalty scored) Peyre; (penalty scored) Trézéguet |

| 21 September 2016 | Anderlecht | 1–0 | Oud-Heverlee Leuven (2) | Anderlecht |
| 19:30 | Harbaoui 16' | Report | | Stadium: Constant Vanden Stock Stadium |

| 21 September 2016 | Lokeren | 3–2 | Cercle Brugge (2) | Lokeren |
| 20:00 | De Ridder 12', 45+2'; De Schryver 84' (o.g.) | Report | Bourdin 59'; Kiš 62' | Stadium: Daknamstadion |

| 21 September 2016 | Roeselare (2) | 2–3 | Eupen | Roeselare |
| 20:00 | Diallo 85' (o.g.); Van Eenoo 90+3' | Report | Mouchamps 6'; Dufour 54', 76' | Stadium: Schiervelde Stadion |

| 21 September 2016 | Kortrijk | 2–0 | Sprimont-Comblain (3) | Kortrijk |
| 20:00 | Kage 80', 88' | Report | | Stadium: Guldensporen Stadion |

| 21 September 2016 | Waasland-Beveren | 2–0 | Oosterzonen Oosterwijk (3) | Beveren |
| 20:00 | Marquet 19'; Jans 73' | Report | | Stadium: Freethiel Stadion |

| 21 September 2016 | Harelbeke (4) | 1–6 | Sint-Truiden | Harelbeke |
| 20:30 | Descheemaecker 69' | Report | Proschwitz 7', 18'; Bezus 8'; Ceballos 10'; Tchenkoua 24'; Boli 80' | Stadium: Forestiersstadion |

| 21 September 2016 | Westerlo | 0–1 | Tubize (2) | Westerlo |
| 20:30 | | Report | Diallo 82' | Stadium: Het Kuipje |

| 21 September 2016 | Cappellen (4) | 1–2 | Zulte Waregem | Kapellen |
| 20:30 | Van den Heuvel 76' | Report | Vetokele 39'; Leye 89' | Stadium: Stadion Jos Van Wellen |

| 21 September 2016 | Lierse (2) | 1–2 | Gent | Lier |
| 20:30 | Zizo 15' | Report | Schoofs 65'; Perbet 90+1' | Stadium: Herman Vanderpoortenstadion |

| 21 September 2016 | Sporting Hasselt (3) | 2–3 | KV Mechelen | Hasselt |
| 20:30 | Sidibe 12'; Caratta 20' | Report | Croizet 53', 74'; Kolovos 88' | Stadium: Stedelijk Sportstadion Hasselt |

| 21 September 2016 | Eendracht Aalst (4) | 0–4 | Genk | Aalst |
| 20:30 | | Report | Karelis 16', 24', 45', 51' | Stadium: Pierre Cornelisstadion |

| 21 September 2016 | Antwerp (2) | 0–2 | Oostende | Antwerp |
| 20:30 | | Report | Berrier 18'; Musona 64' | Stadium: Bosuilstadion |

| 21 September 2016 | ASV Geel (3) | 2–1 | Standard Liège | Geel |
| 20:30 | Damblon 33', 40' | Report | Raman 58' | Stadium: De Leunen |

| 21 September 2016 | Charleroi | 5–0 | Bocholt (4) | Charleroi |
| 20:30 | Diandy 27'; Bedia 39'; Benavente 43', 68'; Fall 73' | Report | | Stadium: Stade du Pays de Charleroi |

== Seventh Round ==
| 29 November 2016 | Eupen | 3–2 | Club Brugge | Eupen |
| 20:00 | García 21'; Onyekuru 51'; Blondelle 90+7' | Report | Vanaken 63'; Vossen 68' | Stadium: Kehrwegstadion; Referee: Jonathan Lardot |

| 29 November 2016 | Sint-Truiden | 2–2 (4–3 p) | KV Mechelen | Sint-Truiden |
| 20:45 | Kotysch 62'; Boli 81' | Report | Vitas 26'; El Messaoudi 65' | Stadium: Stayen; Referee: Frederik Geldhof |
| | Penalties |
| | Peeters (penalty missed); Fernandes (penalty scored); Ono (penalty scored); Boli (penalty missed); De Petter (penalty scored); Cuevas (penalty scored) | | (penalty scored) Vitas; (penalty missed) Matthys; (penalty scored) Croizet; (penalty missed) Kolovos; (penalty scored) Bjelica; (penalty missed) El Messaoudi |

| 30 November 2016 | Kortrijk | 1–0 | Excel Mouscron | Kortrijk |
| 20:00 | Totovytskyi 78' | Report | | Stadium: Guldensporen Stadion; Referee: Lawrence Visser |

| 30 November 2016 | Tubize (2) | 3–4 (a.e.t.) | Oostende | Tubize |
| 20:00 | Keita 56' (pen.); Q. Laurent 58'; Diallo 64' | Report | Cyriac 1', 47'; Pedersen 40'; Siani 119' (pen.) | Stadium: Stade Leburton; Referee: Nathan Verboomen |

| 30 November 2016 | Waasland-Beveren | 1–3 | Genk | Beveren |
| 20:00 | Gano 89' | Report | Samatta 15', 42'; Ndidi 80' | Stadium: Freethiel Stadion; Referee: Sébastien Delferière |

| 30 November 2016 | ASV Geel (3) | 1–2 (a.e.t.) | Zulte Waregem | Geel |
| 20:30 | Bangoura 9' | Report | Derijck 36' (pen.); Meïté 114' | Stadium: De Leunen; Referee: Joeri Van de Velde |

| 30 November 2016 | Gent | 1–0 | Lokeren | Ghent |
| 20:45 | Perbet 78' | Report | | Stadium: Ghelamco Arena; Referee: Nicolas Laforge |

| 1 December 2016 | Charleroi | 2–2 (4–3 p) | Anderlecht | Charleroi |
| 20:30 | Marcq 5'; Baby 90+3' | Report | Spajić 13'; Teodorczyk 82' | Stadium: Stade du Pays de Charleroi; Referee: Luc Wouters |
| | Penalties |
| | Pollet (penalty scored); Benavente (penalty scored); Marcq (penalty scored); Bedia (penalty scored); Hendrickx (penalty scored) | | (penalty scored) Tielemans; (penalty missed) Teodorczyk; (penalty scored) Stanciu; (penalty scored) Bruno |

== Quarter-finals ==
The matches were played on 13 and 14 December 2016.

| 13 December 2016 | Eupen | 4–0 | Kortrijk | Eupen |
| 20:30 | Diallo 9'; García 57' (pen.); Sylla 70' (pen.); Onyekuru 90' | Report | | Stadium: Kehrwegstadion; Referee: Wim Smet |

| 14 December 2016 | Zulte Waregem | 2–0 | Sint-Truiden | Waregem |
| 20:00 | Leye 23'; Madu 90+1' | Report | | Stadium: Regenboogstadion; Referee: Alexandre Boucaut |

| 14 December 2016 | Charleroi | 1–3 (a.e.t.) | Genk | Charleroi |
| 20:30 | Willems 84' | Report | Karelis 70', 95', 117' | Stadium: Stade du Pays de Charleroi; Referee: Christof Dierick |

| 14 December 2016 | Oostende | 1–0 | Gent | Ostend |
| 20:45 | Cyriac 66' | Report | | Stadium: Albertpark; Referee: Jonathan Lardot |

== Semi-finals ==
The semi-finals will be played over two legs, with the first legs played on 17 and 18 January 2017 and the second legs on 31 January and 1 February 2017.

=== First Legs ===
| 17 January 2017 | Oostende | 1–1 | Genk | Ostend |
| 20:30 | Vandendriessche 22' | report | Malinovskyi 56' | Stadium: Albertpark; Referee: Bart Vertenten |

| 18 January 2017 | Zulte Waregem | 1–0 | Eupen | Waregem |
| 20:45 | Coopman 87' | report | | Stadium: Regenboogstadion; Referee: Nicolas Laforge |

=== Second Legs ===
| 31 January 2017 | Genk | 0–1 (1–2 agg.) | Oostende | Genk |
| 20:30 | | Report | Musona 9' | Stadium: Luminus Arena; Attendance: 8,687; Referee: Alexandre Boucaut |

| 1 February 2017 | Eupen | 0–2 (0–3 agg.) | Zulte Waregem | Eupen |
| 20:30 | | | Hämäläinen 78'; Marrone 90' | Stadium: Kehrwegstadion; Referee: Serge Gumienny |

== Final ==
The final took place on 18 March 2017 at the King Baudouin Stadium in Brussels.

18 March 2017
20:45

| Oostende | 3–3 (a.e.t.) | Zulte Waregem |
|---|---|---|
| Dimata 19', 54'; Musona 116' (pen.) | report | Derijck 25'; Coopman 64'; Guèye 111' |
Penalties
| Siani (penalty scored); Canesin (penalty missed); Marušić (penalty scored); Musona (penalty missed) | 2–4 | (penalty scored) Derijck; (penalty scored) Mühren; (penalty scored) Meïté; (penalty scored) Hämäläinen |

King Baudouin Stadium, Brussels
Attendance: 35,000
Referee: Sébastien Delferière
