= Sébastien Delferière =

Belgian football referee

Sébastien Delferiere
- Full name: Sébastien Delferiere
- Born: 2 July 1981 (age 45); Hainaut, Belgium

Domestic
Years	League	Role
2009–2018	Belgian Pro League	Referee

International
Years	League	Role
2010–2018	FIFA listed	Referee

Sébastien Delferiere (born 2 July 1981) is a Belgian former football referee.

Delferiere became a FIFA referee in 2010.

After being involved in a football scandal involving match fixing, the Royal Belgian Football Association has made the decision to ban Sébastien Delferière for life from refereeing any matches in the Belgian competition.

== Match-fixing-scandal ==
In October 2018, Delferière was interrogated as part of an investigation into corruption. He was accused of match-fixing and bribery. A month later, the Royal Belgian Football Association's executive committee denied Delferière FIFA badge by; therefore, he could no longer act as referee of international matches. In the same month Delferière resumed part of his activity for the Belgian federation having been charged with match-fixing and corruption in Belgian soccer in October.

Delferière announced via Facebook that he would prove he had not done anything illegal in April 2019.

In February 2020, it was reported that Delferière's name had been mentioned in Operation "Clean hands" and that he had been fired by KBVB. However, no evidence was provided to the public.

== Other career events ==
In October 2019, Delferière resigned from his position as President of Stade Brainois. In February 2020 Delferière assumed his position as the new sports director for Soignies Sports.
