= 2014–15 Club Brugge KV season =

Club Brugge
2014–15 season
- Head coach: Michel Preud'homme
- Stadium: Jan Breydel Stadium
- Belgian Pro League: 2nd
- Belgian Cup: Winners
- Europa League: Quarter-finals
- Top goalscorer: League: José Izquierdo (13); All: Lior Refaelov (18)
Home colours	Away colours

== Players ==
=== First-team squad ===
Note: Flags indicate national team as defined under FIFA eligibility rules; some limited exceptions apply. Players may hold more than one non-FIFA nationality.

No.	Pos.	Nation	Player
1	GK	AUS	Mathew Ryan
2	DF	BEL	Davy De fauw
3	MF	BEL	Timmy Simons (Captain)
4	DF	CRC	Óscar Duarte
5	MF	CHI	Francisco 'Gato' Silva (on loan from (Spain) Osasuna)
6	MF	BRA	Claudemir
7	MF	ESP	Víctor Vázquez (Vice-captain)
8	FW	ISR	Lior Refaelov
9	FW	BEL	Tom De Sutter
13	GK	GRE	Sokratis Dioudis
14	FW	CRO	Fran Brodić
15	MF	CHN	Shangyuan Wang
18	MF	BRA	Felipe Gedoz
19	DF	BEL	Thomas Meunier
21	FW	MAS	Dion Cools

No.	Pos.	Nation	Player
22	FW	COL	José Izquierdo
24	DF	NED	Stefano Denswil
25	MF	NED	Ruud Vormer
28	DF	BEL	Laurens De Bock
33	GK	SRB	Vladan Kujović
40	DF	BEL	Björn Engels
42	FW	BEL	Nikola Storm
43	MF	BEL	Sander Coopman
44	DF	BEL	Brandon Mechele
53	DF	BEL	Dario Van den Buijs
55	FW	BEL	Tuur Dierckx
57	MF	BEL	Yannick Reuten
58	FW	BEL	Mamadou Obbi Oulare
63	DF	BEL	Boli Bolingoli-Mbombo

=== Transfers in ===
Note: Flags indicate national team as defined under FIFA eligibility rules; some limited exceptions apply. Players may hold more than one non-FIFA nationality.

No.	Pos.	Nation	Player
2	DF	BEL	Davy De fauw (from (Belgium) Zulte Waregem)
5	MF	CHI	Francisco 'Gato' Silva (on loan from (Spain) Osasuna)
6	MF	BRA	Fernando Menegazzo (free transfer)
6	MF	BRA	Claudemir (from (Denmark) FC Copenhagen)
13	GK	GRE	Sokratis Dioudis (from (Greece) Aris)
14	FW	CRO	Fran Brodić (from (Croatia) Dinamo Zagreb)
18	MF	BRA	Felipe Gedoz (from (Uruguay) Defensor Sporting)

No.	Pos.	Nation	Player
22	FW	COL	José Izquierdo (from (Colombia) Once Caldas)
24	DF	NED	Stefano Denswil (from (Netherlands) Ajax)
25	MF	NED	Ruud Vormer (from (Netherlands) Feyenoord)
53	DF	BEL	Dario Van den Buijs (from (Belgium) Club Brugge U21)
55	FW	BEL	Tuur Dierckx (loan return in January 2015 from (Belgium) Kortrijk)
57	MF	BEL	Yannick Reuten (from (Belgium) Club Brugge U21)
58	FW	BEL	Mamadou Obbi Oulare (from (Belgium) Club Brugge U21)

=== Transfers out ===
Note: Flags indicate national team as defined under FIFA eligibility rules; some limited exceptions apply. Players may hold more than one non-FIFA nationality.

No.	Pos.	Nation	Player
2	DF	NOR	Tom Høgli (to (Denmark) FC Copenhagen)
5	DF	SWE	Fredrik Stenman (end of contract)
6	MF	GHA	Enoch Adu (to (Sweden) Malmö, previous season on loan to (Norway) Stabæk)
6	MF	BRA	Fernando Menegazzo (free release due to personal reasons)
7	FW	BDI	Mohammed Tchité (free release)
10	MF	DEN	Jesper Jørgensen (to (Belgium) Zulte Waregem)
11	MF	BEL	Jonathan Blondel (Retired)
14	DF	DEN	Jim Larsen (to (Denmark) FC Midtjylland)
16	FW	BEL	Maxime Lestienne (to (Qatar) Al-Arabi)
17	FW	POL	Waldemar Sobota (on loan to (Germany) St. Pauli)
20	FW	LAT	Valērijs Šabala (first 6 months on loan to (Cyprus) Anorthosis Famagusta, now on loan to (Czech Republic) Jablonec. Previous season on loan to (Latvia) Skonto Riga)
22	FW	ISL	Eiður Guðjohnsen (end of contract)
24	DF	GRE	Valentinos Vlachos (free release, previous season on loan to (Greece) Aris)

No.	Pos.	Nation	Player
27	DF	POR	Elton Monteiro (to (Portugal) Braga, previous season on loan to (Portugal) Académica de Coimbra)
29	FW	BEL	Zinho Gano (on loan to (Belgium) Mouscron-Péruwelz, previous season on loan to (Belgium) Lommel United)
30	FW	CHI	Nicolás Castillo (on loan to (Germany) Mainz)
32	MF	BEL	Vadis Odjidja-Ofoe (to (England) Norwich City)
41	MF	BEL	Birger Verstraete (on loan to (Belgium) Mouscron-Péruwelz)
50	GK	BEL	Sven Dhoest (on loan to (Belgium) Mouscron-Péruwelz)
61	GK	FRA	Martin Sourzac (trial return to (France) AS Monaco)
90	FW	NGR	Kehinde Fatai (loan return to (Romania) Astra Giurgiu)
--	FW	NOR	Mushaga Bakenga (first 8 months on loan to (Germany) Eintracht Braunschweig, now on loan to (Norway) Molde. Previous season on loan to (Denmark) Esbjerg)
--	MF	BEL	Jimmy De Jonghe (on loan to (Belgium) Roeselare, previous season on loan to (Belgium) Lierse)
--	MF	GRE	Spyros Fourlanos (to (Greece) Panionios, previous season on loan to (Greece) AEL Kalloni)
--	FW	MKD	Ivan Tričkovski (free release, previous season on loan to (Belgium) Waasland-Beveren)

== Staff ==
=== Coaching staff ===
- (Belgium) Michel Preud'homme (Head coach T1)
- (Belgium) Philippe Clement (Assistant coach T2)
- (Belgium) Stan Van den Buijs (Assistant coach T3)
- (Belgium) Stéphane Van der Heyden (Assistant coach T4)
- (Belgium) Jan Van Steenberghe (Goalkeeping coach)
- (Belgium) Joost Desender (Physical coach)
- (Belgium) Renaat Philippaerts (Physical coach)
- (Belgium) Siebe Hannoset (Performance coach)

=== Medical staff ===
- (Belgium) Karel Watteyne (Doctor)
- (Belgium) Thierry Dalewyn (Doctor)
- (Belgium) Jan Van Damme (Physiotherapist)
- (Belgium) Dimitri Dobbenie (Physiotherapist)
- (Belgium) Valentijn Deneulin (Physiotherapist)
- (Belgium) Peter Destickere (Masseur)

=== Team Support ===
- (Belgium) Dévy Rigaux (Team manager)
- (Belgium) Pascal Plovie (Kit man)
- (Belgium) Michel Dierings (Assistant kit man)
- (Belgium) Herman Brughmans (Assistant kit man)

== Results ==
=== Belgian Pro League ===
==== League table ====
Pos	Team	Pld	W	D	L	GF	GA	GD	Pts	Qualification	GNT	CLU	AND	STA	CHA	KOR
1	Gent (C)	10	6	2	2	18	11	+7	49	Qualification for the Champions League group stage	—	2–2	2–1	2–0	1–1	2–0
2	Club Brugge	10	5	1	4	16	16	0	47	Qualification for the Champions League third qualifying round	2–3	—	2–1	2–1	3–1	1–0
3	Anderlecht	10	5	2	3	18	13	+5	46	Qualification for the Europa League group stage (Note: Since winners of the 2014–15 Belgian Cup, Club Brugge, qualified for the Champions League based on league position, the spot awarded to the Cup winner (Europa League group stage) was passed to the third-placed team and the other spots were adjusted accordingly.)	2–1	3–1	—	1–1	1–0	5–1
4	Standard Liège	10	4	1	5	14	13	+1	40	Qualification for the Europa League third qualifying round	1–3	1–0	3–1	—	2–0	4–0
5	Charleroi	10	3	2	5	13	15	−2	36	Qualification for the Testmatches to Europa League (Note: The team finishing in fifth place, Charleroi, will play the testmatches against the winner of the Belgian Europa League playoff final, for a spot in the Europa League second qualifying round.)	2–1	2–3	0–1	1–0	—	5–2
6	Kortrijk	10	2	2	6	11	22	−11	34		0–1	2–0	2–2	3–1	1–1	—

Source: soccerway.com
Rules for classification: 1) points; 2) points after deduction of (possible) half points added due to rounding; 3) number of wins; 4) goal difference; 5) number of goals scored; 6) number of away goals scored; 7) number of away wins.
(C) Champions

=== Belgian Cup ===
==== Final ====
The final took place on 22 March 2015 at the King Baudouin Stadium in Brussels.

22 March 2015 Final	Club Brugge	2–1	Anderlecht	Brussels
18:00	De Sutter 12'; Refaelov 90+2'	Report	Mitrović 89'	Stadium: King Baudouin Stadium; Referee: Serge Gumienny

=== UEFA Europa League ===
==== Group stage ====
Pos	Team	Pld	W	D	L	GF	GA	GD	Pts	Qualification	BRU	TOR	HJK	KOB
1	(Belgium) Club Brugge	6	3	3	0	10	2	+8	12	Advance to knockout phase	—	0–0	2–1	1–1
2	(Italy) Torino	6	3	2	1	9	3	+6	11	Advance to knockout phase	0–0	—	2–0	1–0
3	(Finland) HJK	6	2	0	4	5	11	−6	6		0–3	2–1	—	2–1
4	(Denmark) Copenhagen	6	1	1	4	5	13	−8	4		0–4	1–5	2–0	—

Source: Soccerway
Rules for classification: Group stage tiebreakers

==== Knockout phase ====
19 February 2015 Round of 32, first leg	AaB (Denmark)	1–3	(Belgium) Club Brugge	Nordjyske Arena, Aalborg
19:00	Helenius 71' (pen.)	Report	Oulare 25'; Refaelov 29'; Petersen 61' (o.g.)	Attendance: 8,102; Referee: Tom Harald Hagen (Norway)

26 February 2015 Round of 32, second leg	Club Brugge (Belgium)	3–0 (6–1 agg.)	(Denmark) AaB	Jan Breydel Stadium, Bruges
21:05	Vázquez 11'; Oularé 64'; Bolingoli-Mbombo 74'	Report		Attendance: 11,804; Referee: Anastasios Sidiropoulos (Greece)

12 March 2015 Round of 16, second leg	Club Brugge (Belgium)	2–1	(Turkey) Beşiktaş	Jan Breydel Stadium, Bruges
19:00	De Sutter 62'; Refaelov 79' (pen.)	Report	Töre 46'	Attendance: 12,977; Referee: Craig Thomson (Scotland)

19 March 2015 Round of 16, second leg	Beşiktaş (Turkey)	1–3 (2–5 agg.)	(Belgium) Club Brugge	Atatürk Olympic Stadium, Istanbul
21:05	Ramon 48'	Report	De Sutter 61'; Bolingoli-Mbombo 80', 90'	Attendance: 65,110; Referee: Sergei Karasev (Russia)

16 April 2015 Quarter-finals, second leg	Club Brugge (Belgium)	0–0	(Ukraine) Dnipro Dnipropetrovsk	Jan Breydel Stadium, Bruges
21:05		Report		Attendance: 29,000; Referee: Damir Skomina (Slovenia)

23 April 2015 Quarter-finals, second leg	Dnipro Dnipropetrovsk (Ukraine)	1–0 (1–0 agg.)	(Belgium) Club Brugge	Olympic Stadium, Kyiv
21:05	Shakhov 82'	Report		Attendance: 16,234; Referee: Alberto Undiano Mallenco (Spain)
