= 2015 Belgian Cup final =

- Event: 2014–15 Belgian Cup
Club Brugge	Anderlecht
2	1
- Date: 22 March 2015
- Venue: King Baudouin Stadium, Brussels
- Referee: Serge Gumienny

The 2015 Belgian Cup final, named Cofidis Cup after the sponsor, was the 60th Belgian Cup final and took place on 22 March 2015 between Club Brugge and Anderlecht. It was the first time the two giants of Belgian football met in the final since the 1993–94 Belgian Cup. The match finished in a dramatic way as Anderlecht looked to have taken the game to overtime through a last minute equalizer by Aleksandar Mitrović, cancelling out the earlier goal by Tom De Sutter, however in added time Lior Refaelov struck goal from outside the penalty area.

== Route to the final ==
Club Brugge				Anderlecht
Opponent	Result	Legs	Round	Opponent	Result	Legs
Aalst (II)	6–1	6–1 away	Sixth round	Patro Eisden Maasmechelen (II)	5–3 (a.e.t.)	5–3 away (a.e.t.)
Kortrijk	3–0	3–0 away	Seventh round	KRC Mechelen (II)	4–1	4–1 home
KV Mechelen	3–2	0–0 away; 3–2 home	Quarter-finals	Zulte Waregem	7–2	3–0 away; 4–2 home
Cercle Brugge	8–3	5–1 home; 3–2 away	Semi-finals	Gent	5–0	2–0 away; 3–0 home

== Match ==
=== Details ===
22 March 2015
18:30 CET (Note: The match was scheduled to start at 18:00, but postponed with 30 minutes due to traffic jams around the stadium.)

Club Brugge	2–1	Anderlecht
De Sutter 12'; Refaelov 90+2'	Report	Mitrović 89'

King Baudouin Stadium, Brussels
Referee: Serge Gumienny

Club Brugge	Anderlecht

GK	1	(Australia) Mathew Ryan
RB	19	(Belgium) Thomas Meunier
CB	4	(Costa Rica) Óscar Duarte
CB	44	(Belgium) Brandon Mechele
LB	28	(Belgium) Laurens De Bock
MF	22	(Colombia) José Izquierdo		(substituted off) 81'
MF	25	(Netherlands) Ruud Vormer
MF	3	(Belgium) Timmy Simons (c)
MF	8	(Israel) Lior Refaelov	(yellow card) 90+3'
FW	63	(Belgium) Boli Bolingoli		(substituted off) 59'
FW	9	(Belgium) Tom De Sutter		(substituted off) 73'
Substitutes:
DF	2	(Belgium) Davy De fauw
DF	5	(Chile) Francisco Silva
MF	6	(Brazil) Claudemir		(substituted on) 81'
MF	18	(Brazil) Felipe Gedoz	(yellow card) 69'	(substituted on) 59'
GK	33	(Serbia) Vladan Kujović
FW	55	(Belgium) Tuur Dierckx
FW	58	(Belgium) Obbi Oulare		(substituted on) 73'
Manager:
(Belgium) Michel Preud'homme

GK	1	(Belgium) Silvio Proto (c)
RB	32	(Belgium) Leander Dendoncker
CB	13	(Portugal) Rolando
CB	3	(Belgium) Olivier Deschacht
LB	2	(France) Fabrice Nsakala		(substituted off) 76'
CM	16	(Belgium) Steven Defour
CM	10	(Belgium) Dennis Praet
RW	12	(France) Maxime Colin	(yellow card) 11'	(substituted off) 85'
AM	11	(Germany) Marko Marin		(substituted off) 58'
LW	7	(Honduras) Andy Najar	(yellow card) 60'
CF	45	(Serbia) Aleksandar Mitrović
Substitutes:
DF	14	(Netherlands) Bram Nuytinck
MF	18	(Ghana) Frank Acheampong		(substituted on) 58'
MF	20	(Guinea) Ibrahima Conté		(substituted on) 85'
MF	31	(Belgium) Youri Tielemans
GK	33	(Belgium) Davy Roef
FW	35	(Belgium) Aaron Leya Iseka		(substituted on) 76'
DF	39	(Belgium) Anthony Vanden Borre
Manager:
(Albania) Besnik Hasi

Assistant referees:
(Belgium) Jimmy Cremers
(Belgium) Yves De Neve
Fourth official:
(Belgium) Styn Hutsebaut

Match rules

- 90 minutes.
- 30 minutes of extra time if necessary.
- Penalty shoot-out if scores still level.
- Seven named substitutes.
- Maximum of three substitutions.

== See also ==
- R.S.C. Anderlecht–Club Brugge KV rivalry
