= 2013–14 Club Brugge KV season =

Club Brugge
2013–14 season
- Manager: Michel Preud'homme
- Stadium: Jan Breydel Stadium
- Belgian Pro League: 2nd
- Belgian Cup: Round 7
- Europa League: Third qualifying round
Home colours	Away colours	Third colours

The 2013–14 Club Brugge K.V. season was the club's 111th season since establishment in 1891. They competed in the Belgian Pro League, the Belgian Cup as well as the UEFA Europa League.

== Players ==
=== First-team squad ===
Note: Flags indicate national team as defined under FIFA eligibility rules; some limited exceptions apply. Players may hold more than one non-FIFA nationality.

No.	Pos.	Nation	Player
2	DF	NOR	Tom Høgli
3	MF	BEL	Timmy Simons (captain)
4	DF	CRC	Óscar Duarte
6	MF	GHA	Enoch Adu
7	FW	BDI	Mohammed Tchité
8	FW	ISR	Lior Refaelov
9	FW	BEL	Tom De Sutter
10	MF	DEN	Jesper Jørgensen
11	MF	BEL	Jonathan Blondel
13	MF	ESP	Víctor Vázquez
14	DF	DEN	Jim Larsen
15	MF	CHN	Shangyuan Wang
16	FW	BEL	Maxime Lestienne
17	MF	POL	Waldemar Sobota
19	DF	BEL	Thomas Meunier
21	GK	AUS	Mathew Ryan

No.	Pos.	Nation	Player
22	FW	ISL	Eiður Guðjohnsen
27	DF	POR	Elton Monteiro
28	DF	BEL	Laurens De Bock
30	FW	CHI	Nicolás Castillo
32	MF	BEL	Vadis Odjidja-Ofoe
33	GK	SRB	Vladan Kujović
40	DF	BEL	Björn Engels
41	MF	BEL	Birger Verstraete
42	FW	BEL	Nikola Storm
43	MF	BEL	Sander Coopman
44	DF	BEL	Brandon Mechele
50	GK	BEL	Sven Dhoest
55	FW	BEL	Tuur Dierckx
63	FW	BEL	Boli Bolingoli-Mbombo
77	DF	SWE	Fredrik Stenman
90	FW	NGR	Kehinde Fatai (on loan from Astra Giurgiu)

=== Reserve squad ===
Note: Flags indicate national team as defined under FIFA eligibility rules; some limited exceptions apply. Players may hold more than one non-FIFA nationality.

No.	Pos.	Nation	Player
—	GK	BEL	Sven Delarbre
—	GK	BEL	Arthur Hannes
—	DF	BEL	Alexander Embrechts
—	DF	BEL	Gauthier Libbrecht
—	MF	BEL	Tom Pacquet

No.	Pos.	Nation	Player
—	MF	BEL	Yannick Reuten
—	FW	BEL	Hakim Borahsasar
—	FW	BEL	Daan Debouver
—	FW	BEL	Aaron Vanfleteren

=== Transfers in ===
No.	Pos.	Nation	Player
3	DF	BEL	Timmy Simons (from (Germany) Nürnberg)
9	FW	BEL	Tom De Sutter (from (Belgium) Anderlecht)
15	FW	CHN	Wang Shangyuan (free agent)
20	MF	GRE	Spyros Fourlanos (from (Greece) Panathinaikos)
21	GK	AUS	Mathew Ryan (from (Australia) Central Coast Mariners)
24	DF	GRE	Valentinos Vlachos (from (Greece) AEK Athens)
27	DF	POR	Elton Monteiro (from (England) Arsenal Academy)
90	FW	NGR	Kehinde Fatai (on loan from (Romania) Astra Giurgiu)
—	FW	GUI	Obbi Oulare (from (France) Lille)
—	FW	POL	Waldemar Sobota (from (Poland) Śląsk Wrocław)
30	FW	CHI	Nicolás Castillo (from (Chile) Universidad Católica)

=== Transfers out ===
No.	Pos.	Nation	Player
3	DF	SWE	Michael Almebäck (to (Denmark) Brøndby)
4	DF	BEL	Carl Hoefkens (to (Belgium) Lierse)
9	FW	BEL	Björn Vleminckx (was on loan to (Turkey) Gençlerbirliği, now sold to (Turkey) Kayseri Erciyesspor)
17	FW	MKD	Ivan Tričkovski (on loan to (Belgium) Waasland-Beveren)
18	DF	NED	Ryan Donk (to (Turkey) Kasımpaşa)
20	MF	BEL	Thibaut Van Acker (was on loan to (Belgium) Beerschot, now sold to (Belgium) Cercle Brugge)
21	DF	BEL	Bart Buysse (to (Belgium) Cercle Brugge)
22	DF	ESP	Jordi Figueras (was on loan to (Spain) Rayo Vallecano, now sold to (Spain) Betis Sevilla)
25	FW	NOR	Mushaga Bakenga (was on loan to (Belgium) Cercle Brugge, now loaned to (Denmark) Esbjerg)
28	DF	BEL	Jannes Vansteenkiste (to (Belgium) Antwerp)
39	GK	SRB	Bojan Jorgačević (to (Turkey) Kayseri Erciyesspor)
70	FW	COL	Carlos Bacca (to (Spain) Sevilla)
—	FW	NED	Jordan Botaka (was on loan to (Portugal) Belenenses, now sold to (Netherlands) Excelsior)
—	GK	BEL	Colin Coosemans (was on loan to (Belgium) Waasland-Beveren, now sold)
—	MF	BEL	Jimmy De Jonghe (was on loan to (Belgium) Zulte Waregem, now loaned to (Belgium) Lierse)
—	FW	BEL	Zinho Gano (on loan to (Belgium) Lommel United)
—	DF	BEL	Maxime Gunst (was on loan to (Belgium) Eendracht Aalst, now sold to (Netherlands) FC Eindhoven)
6	MF	GHA	Enoch Kofi Adu (on loan to (Norway) Stabæk)
20	MF	GRE	Spyros Fourlanos (on loan to (Greece) AEL Kalloni)
24	DF	GRE	Valentinos Vlachos (on loan to (Greece) Aris)
27	DF	POR	Elton Monteiro (on loan to (Portugal) Académica de Coimbra)
—	FW	LAT	Valērijs Šabala (signed from (Latvia) Skonto, but immediately loaned out to the same team)

== Results ==
=== Belgian Pro League ===
==== Regular season ====
27 July 2013 1	Club Brugge	2 – 0	Charleroi	Bruges
	Simons (red card) 21'; Wang Shangyuan 66'; Blondel 90+2'	Report	Marcq (yellow card) 36' (yellow-red card) 45'	Stadium: Jan Breydel Stadium; Attendance: 25,000; Referee: Jonathan Lardot

5 August 2013 2	Oostende	1 – 2	Club Brugge	Ostend
	Brillant 24'	Report	Engels 3'; Bolingoli 64'	Stadium: Albertpark; Attendance: 7,382; Referee: Joeri Van De Velde

11 August 2013 3	Club Brugge	1 – 1	Zulte Waregem	Bruges
	Simons 18' (pen.)	Report	Naessens 77'	Stadium: Jan Breydel Stadium; Attendance: 23,466; Referee: Serge Gumienny

18 August 2013 4	Mechelen	1 – 2	Club Brugge	Mechelen
	de Witte 71' (pen.)	Report	De Sutter 38'; De Bock (yellow card) 58' (red card) 76'; Simons 85' (pen.)	Stadium: Argosstadion Achter de Kazerne; Attendance: 10,653; Referee: Luc Wouters

25 August 2013 5	Club Brugge	1 – 1	Gent	Bruges
	Høgli 12'	Report	Pedersen 45'; González Pirez (yellow card) 41' (yellow-red card) 90'	Stadium: Jan Breydel Stadium; Attendance: 23,000; Referee: Jérôme Efong Nzolo

2 September 2013 6	Waasland-Beveren	1 – 2	Club Brugge	Beveren
	Oumarou (red card) 76'; Blondelle 90+3'	Report	Lestienne 1'; Jørgensen 56'	Stadium: Freethiel Stadion; Attendance: 8,000; Referee: Sébastien Delferiere

15 September 2013 7	Club Brugge	4 – 1	Lierse	Bruges
	Lestienne 42'; Jørgensen 62'; De Sutter 80', 90'	Report	Bourabia 70'	Stadium: Jan Breydel Stadium; Attendance: 23,000; Referee: Johan Verbist

22 September 2013 8	Club Brugge	4 – 0	Anderlecht	Bruges
	Simons 31' (pen.); Lestienne 59', 75'; Fatai 87'	Report	Mitrović (red card) 90+2'	Stadium: Jan Breydel Stadium; Attendance: 27,024; Referee: Serge Gumienny

29 September 2013 9	Mons	0 – 1	Club Brugge	Mons
		Report	Lestienne 2'	Stadium: Stade Charles Tondreau; Attendance: 4,100; Referee: Jérôme Efong Nzolo

6 October 2013 10	Club Brugge	1 – 0	OH Leuven	Bruges
	Odjidja-Ofoe 33'; Lestienne (yellow card) 47' (yellow-red card) 55'	Report		Stadium: Jan Breydel Stadium; Attendance: 23,000; Referee: Sébastien Delferiere

21 October 2013 11	Kortrijk	4 – 1	Club Brugge	Kortrijk
	Santini 22' (pen.), 65', 90+5' (pen.); Coulibaly 57'	Report	Engels 32' (red card) 90+2'; De Sutter (yellow card) 8' (yellow-red card) 37'	Stadium: Guldensporen Stadion; Attendance: 9,000; Referee: Luc Wouters

28 October 2013 12	Club Brugge	0 – 2	Genk	Bruges
		Report	Vossen 42'; Hyland 84'	Stadium: Jan Breydel Stadium; Attendance: 28,000; Referee: Joeri Van De Velde

1 November 2013 13	Cercle Brugge	2 – 0	Club Brugge	Bruges
	Buyl 22'; Kabanaga 79'	Report	Vázquez (red card) 40'	Stadium: Jan Breydel Stadium; Attendance: 14,500; Referee: Frederik Geldhof

4 November 2013 14	Club Brugge	1 – 0	Lokeren	Bruges
	De Sutter 21'	Report		Stadium: Jan Breydel Stadium; Attendance: 24,000; Referee: Jérôme Efong Nzolo

11 November 2013 15	Standard Liège	0 – 0	Club Brugge	Liège
		Report		Stadium: Stade Maurice Dufrasne; Attendance: 25,805; Referee: Alexandre Boucaut

25 November 2013 16	Lokeren	0 – 3	Club Brugge	Lokeren
		Report	Lestienne 36'; De Sutter 45'; Simons 86' (pen.)	Stadium: Daknamstadion; Attendance: 8,700; Referee: Johan Verbist

30 November 2013 17	Club Brugge	2 – 0	Oostende	Bruges
20:00	Mechele (yellow card) 59'; De Sutter 66', 90+3'	Summary	Niels De Schutter (yellow card) 37'; Luissint (yellow card) 55'; Berrier (yellow card) 62'	Stadium: Jan Breydel Stadium; Attendance: 24,095; Referee: (Belgium) Wim Smet

7 December 2013 18	Club Brugge	3 – 0	KV Mechelen	Bruges
20:00	Odjidja-Ofoe 23'; Guðjohnsen 34'; Jørgensen 70'	Summary	Ghomsi (red card) 63'	Stadium: Jan Breydel Stadium; Attendance: 24,000; Referee: (Belgium) Joeri Van De Velde

15 December 2013 19	RCSC	2 – 2	Club Brugge	Stade du Pays de Charleroi
20:30	Pollet 61'; Kaya 69' (yellow card) 70'; François (yellow card) 81'; Kebano (yellow card) 85'	Summary	Sobota 30'; Lestienne 45+1'; De Bock (yellow card) 60'; Engels (yellow card) 68'; Odjidja-Ofoe (yellow card) 84'	Attendance: 6,312; Referee: (Belgium) Serge Gumienny

22 December 2013 20	KAA Gent	1 – 3	Club Brugge	Ghelamco Arena
14:30	Pedersen 31' van der Bruggen (yellow card) 63'	Summary	Sobota 10', 53' (yellow card) 57'; Engels (yellow card) 63'; Lestienne 64'; Høgli (red card) 85'	Attendance: 19,866; Referee: (Belgium) Jerome Efong Nzolo

26 December 2014 21	Club Brugge	1 – 2	Waasland-Beveren	Bruges
20:30	Simons 2' (pen.); Tchité (yellow card) 19'; De Bock (yellow card) 59'	Summary	Bojović 4'; Veselinović (yellow card) 24'; Tričkovski 51'	Stadium: Jan Breydel Stadium; Attendance: 29,042; Referee: (Belgium) Christof Virant

18 January 2014 22	Lierse S.K.	1 – 1	Club Brugge	Herman Vanderpoortenstadion
20:00	Wils (yellow card) 64'; Vercauteren (yellow card) 66'; Hazurov 90+2'	Summary	Vázquez 51'; Sobota (yellow card) 89'	Attendance: 8,666; Referee: (Belgium) Jonathan Lardot

26 January 2014 23	Anderlecht	2 – 0	Club Brugge	Constant Vanden Stock Stadium
18:00	Mitrović 39'; N'Sakala 88' de Zeeuw (yellow card) 90'	Summary	Engels (yellow card) 90'	Attendance: 19,873; Referee: (Belgium) Serge Gumienny

1 February 2014 24	Club Brugge	2 – 1	Mons	Bruges
20:00	Guðjohnsen 82'; Refaelov 88'	Summary	Monteyne (yellow card) 31'; Spungin (yellow card) 67'; Adrien Saussez (yellow card) 76'; Chatelle 86'	Stadium: Jan Breydel Stadium; Attendance: 25,000; Referee: (Belgium) Jerome Efong Nzolo

10 February 2014 25	1 – 3	Club Brugge

15 February 2014 26	Club Brugge	3 – 1	Bruges
			Stadium: Jan Breydel Stadium

24 February 2013 27	2 – 5	Club Brugge

3 March 2013 28	Club Brugge	1 – 0	Bruges
			Stadium: Jan Breydel Stadium

9 March 2013 29	1 – 1

17 March 2013 30	Club Brugge	2 – 0	Bruges
			Stadium: Jan Breydel Stadium

==== Championship playoff ====
29 March 2014 1	Club Brugge	5 – 1	Lokeren	Bruges
		Report		Stadium: Jan Breydel Stadium

7 April 2014 2	Anderlecht	3 – 0	Club Brugge
		Report

13 April 2014 3	Zulte-Waregem	2 – 1	Club Brugge
		Report

17 April 2014 4	Club Brugge	2 – 0	Genk	Bruges
		Report		Stadium: Jan Breydel Stadium

21 April 2014 5	Club Brugge	0 – 0	Standard Liège	Bruges
		Report		Stadium: Jan Breydel Stadium

27 April 2014 6	Lokeren	1 – 3	Club Brugge
		Report

5 May 2014 7	Club Brugge	0 – 1	Anderlecht	Bruges
		Report		Stadium: Jan Breydel Stadium

11 May 2014 8	Standard Liège	0 – 1	Club Brugge
		Report

16 May 2014 9	Genk	2 – 3	Club Brugge
		Report

18 May 2014 10	Club Brugge	2 – 0	Zulte-Waregem	Bruges
		Report		Stadium: Jan Breydel Stadium

=== Belgian Cup ===
25 September 2013 Round 6	Oudenaarde	0 − 1	Club Brugge	Oudenaarde
20:45 CEST			Jørgensen 59'	Stadium: Burgemeester Thienpontstadion

4 December 2013 Round 7	Kortrijk	1 − 0 (a.e.t.)	Club Brugge	Kortrijk
20:45 CET	Santini 98'			Stadium: Guldensporen Stadion

=== UEFA Europa League ===
==== Third qualifying round ====
1 August 2013 First leg	Śląsk Wrocław (Poland)	1 – 0	(Belgium) Club Brugge	Wrocław, Poland
20:45	Plaku 64'	Report		Stadium: Stadion Miejski; Attendance: 17,132; Referee: Anthony Taylor (England)

8 August 2013 Second leg	Club Brugge (Belgium)	3 – 3 (4 – 3 agg.)	(Poland) Śląsk Wrocław	Bruges, Belgium
20:45	Refaelov 58'; Duarte 80'; De Sutter 90+1'	Report	Sobota 9', 76'; Paixão 60'	Stadium: Jan Breydel Stadium; Attendance: 25,945; Referee: Miroslav Zelinka (Czech Republic)
