= 2015–16 Club Brugge KV season =

Club Brugge
2015–16 season
- Head coach: Michel Preud'homme
- Stadium: Jan Breydel Stadium
- Belgian Pro League: 1st
- Belgian Cup: Runners-up
- Belgian Super Cup: Runners-up
- UEFA Europa League: Group stage
- Top goalscorer: Abdoulay Diaby; Jelle Vossen (13 each)
Home colours	Away colours	Third colours

During the 2015–16 Belgian football season, Club Brugge competed in the Belgian Pro League.

== First team squad ==
Note: Flags indicate national team as defined under FIFA eligibility rules; some limited exceptions apply. Players may hold more than one non-FIFA nationality.

No.	Pos.	Nation	Player
2	DF	BEL	Davy De fauw
3	MF	BEL	Timmy Simons (captain)
4	DF	CRC	Óscar Duarte
5	DF	FRA	Jean-Charles Castelletto
6	MF	BRA	Claudemir
7	MF	ESP	Víctor Vázquez (vice-captain)
8	MF	ISR	Lior Refaelov
9	FW	BEL	Jelle Vossen
10	FW	MLI	Abdoulay Diaby
11	FW	AUS	Bernie Ibini
16	GK	BEL	Sébastien Bruzzese
17	FW	BRA	Leandro Pereira
18	MF	BRA	Felipe Gedoz
19	DF	BEL	Thomas Meunier
20	MF	BEL	Hans Vanaken
21	DF	BEL	Dion Cools

No.	Pos.	Nation	Player
22	FW	COL	José Izquierdo
24	DF	NED	Stefano Denswil
25	MF	NED	Ruud Vormer
27	GK	BEL	Michael Cordier
28	DF	BEL	Laurens De Bock
30	MF	NGA	Mikel Agu (on loan from Porto)
38	GK	TUR	Sinan Bolat (on loan from Porto)
40	DF	BEL	Björn Engels
41	GK	BEL	Jens Teunckens
43	MF	BEL	Sander Coopman
44	DF	BEL	Brandon Mechele
45	DF	BEL	Lennert De Smul
46	FW	BEL	Dylan Seys
55	FW	BEL	Tuur Dierckx
63	DF	BEL	Boli Bolingoli

== Competitions ==
Competition	Started round	Final position / round	First match	Last match
2015–16 Belgian Pro League	—	Champions	25 July 2015	14 March 2016
2015–16 Belgian Cup	6th round	Runner Up	23 September 2015	20 March 2016
UEFA Champions League	Third qualifying	Play-off round	16 September 2015	16 March 2016
UEFA Europa League	Group stage	Group stage	17 September 2015	10 December 2015

Updated to match played 15 May 2016
Source: Competitions

== Results ==
=== Belgian Pro League ===
==== Regular season ====
Pos	Team	Pld	W	D	L	GF	GA	GD	Pts	Qualification or relegation
1	Club Brugge	30	21	1	8	64	30	+34	64	Qualification for the Championship play-offs
2	Gent	30	17	9	4	56	29	+27	60	Qualification for the Championship play-offs
3	Anderlecht	30	15	10	5	51	29	+22	55	Qualification for the Championship play-offs
4	Oostende	30	14	7	9	55	44	+11	49	Qualification for the Championship play-offs
5	Genk	30	14	6	10	42	30	+12	48	Qualification for the Championship play-offs

Source: Belgian Pro League, Soccerway
Rules for classification: 1) Points; 2) Matches won; 3) Goal difference; 4) Goals scored; 5) Away goals scored; 6) Away matches won; 7) Play-off.

==== Championship play-offs ====
Pos	Team	Pld	W	D	L	GF	GA	GD	Pts	Qualification	CLU	AND	GNT	GNK	OOS	ZWA
1	Club Brugge (C)	10	7	1	2	25	9	+16	54	Qualification for the Champions League group stage	—	4–0	2–0	3–1	2–2	5–0
2	Anderlecht	10	6	1	3	15	16	−1	47	Qualification for the Champions League third qualifying round	1–0	—	2–0	1–0	2–1	2–0
3	Gent	10	3	3	4	10	15	−5	42	Qualification for the Europa League third qualifying round	1–4	1–1	—	0–0	2–0	1–1
4	Genk (O)	10	5	1	4	20	13	+7	40	Qualification for the play-off final	4–2	5–2	1–2	—	4–0	2–0
5	Oostende	10	3	2	5	14	19	−5	36		0–1	4–2	0–1	2–1	—	3–3
6	Zulte Waregem	10	1	2	7	11	23	−12	27		0–2	1–2	4–2	1–2	1–2	—

Source: Belgian Pro League, Soccerway
Rules for classification: 1) Points; 2) Points without (possible) half points added due to rounding; 3) Matches won; 4) Goal difference; 5) Goals scored; 6) Away goals scored; 7) Away matches won; 8) Play-off.
(C) Champions; (O) Play-off winners

=== UEFA Europa League ===
Pos	Team	Pld	W	D	L	GF	GA	GD	Pts	Qualification	NAP	MID	BRU	LEG
1	(Italy) Napoli	6	6	0	0	22	3	+19	18	Advance to knockout phase	—	5–0	5–0	5–2
2	(Denmark) Midtjylland	6	2	1	3	6	12	−6	7	Advance to knockout phase	1–4	—	1–1	1–0
3	(Belgium) Club Brugge	6	1	2	3	4	11	−7	5		0–1	1–3	—	1–0
4	(Poland) Legia Warsaw	6	1	1	4	4	10	−6	4		0–2	1–0	1–1	—

Source: Soccerway
Rules for classification: Group stage tiebreakers
