= Tuur Dierckx =

Belgian footballer (born 1995)

Personal information
- Date of birth: 9 May 1995 (age 31)
- Place of birth: Broechem, Belgium
- Height: 1.71 m (5 ft 7 in)
- Position: Winger

Team information
- Current team: Sporting Hasselt
- Number: 55

Youth career
- 2009–2013: Club Brugge

Senior career*
Years	Team	Apps	(Gls)
2013–2016	Club Brugge	44	(6)
2014–2015	→ Kortrijk (loan)	17	(3)
2016–2017	Antwerp	25	(5)
2017–2020	Waasland-Beveren	44	(5)
2020–2023	Westerlo	61	(9)
2023–2024	Atromitos	13	(0)
2024	Deinze	9	(2)
2025–	Sporting Hasselt	34	(8)

International career
2010	Belgium U15	1	(0)
2010–2011	Belgium U16	5	(1)
2011–2012	Belgium U17	9	(5)
2013–2014	Belgium U19	13	(7)
2015–2016	Belgium U21	4	(0)
- * Club domestic league appearances and goals as of 22:05, 26 October 2026 (UTC)

Tuur Dierckx (born 9 May 1995) is a Belgian professional footballer who plays as a winger for Sporting Hasselt.

== Career ==
Dierckx made his debut on 26 July 2013 in the first game of the 2013–14 season against Charleroi. He replaced Lior Refaelov after 81 minutes as Club Brugge won the game 2–0.

Dierckx signed for Antwerp in 2016.

On 1 August 2023, Atromitos officially announced the signing of Dierckx on a two-year contract.

In June 2025, it was confirmed that Tuur Dierckx would join Sporting Hasselt.

== Personal life ==
In March 2021, Dierckx was sentenced to one month in prison for hosting a party during lockdown amid the COVID-19 pandemic in Belgium. He also received a fine of €800.

== Career statistics ==
=== Club ===
As of match played 5 August 2023

Appearances and goals by club, season and competition
Club	Season	League			Cup		Continental		Other		Total	
Club	Season	Division	Apps	Goals	Apps	Goals	Apps	Goals	Apps	Goals	Apps	Goals
Club Brugge	2013–14	Pro League	6	0	0	0	1 (Note: Appearances in the Europa League)	0	—		7	0
Club Brugge	2014–15	Pro League	13	1	2	0	5	0	—		20	1
Club Brugge	2015–16	Pro League	25	5	4	0	5 (Note: Three appearances in the Champions League and two in the Europa League)	0	0	0	34	5
Club Brugge	Total		44	6	6	0	11	0	0	0	61	6
Kortrijk (loan)	2014–15	Belgian Pro League	17	3	2	2	—		—		19	5
Antwerp	2016–17	Belgian First Division B	25	5	2	1	—		—		27	6
Waasland-Beveren	2017–18	Belgian First Division A	20	2	3	1	—		—		23	3
Waasland-Beveren	2018–19	Belgian First Division A	7	0	0	0	—		—		7	0
Waasland-Beveren	2019–20	Belgian First Division A	17	3	0	0	—		—		17	4
Waasland-Beveren	Total		44	5	3	1	—		—		47	6
Westerlo	2020–21	Belgian First Division B	22	1	0	0	—		—		22	1
Westerlo	2021–22	Belgian First Division B	7	3	1	2	—		—		8	5
Westerlo	2022–23	Belgian First Division A	32	5	2	1	—		—		34	6
Westerlo	Total		61	9	3	3	—		—		64	12
Career total			191	28	16	7	11	0	0	0	218	35

== Honours ==
Club Brugge

- Belgian First Division: 2015–16
- Belgian Cup: 2014–15

Westerlo

- Belgian First Division B: 2021–22
