= Víctor Vázquez (footballer, born 1987) =

Spanish footballer (born 1987)

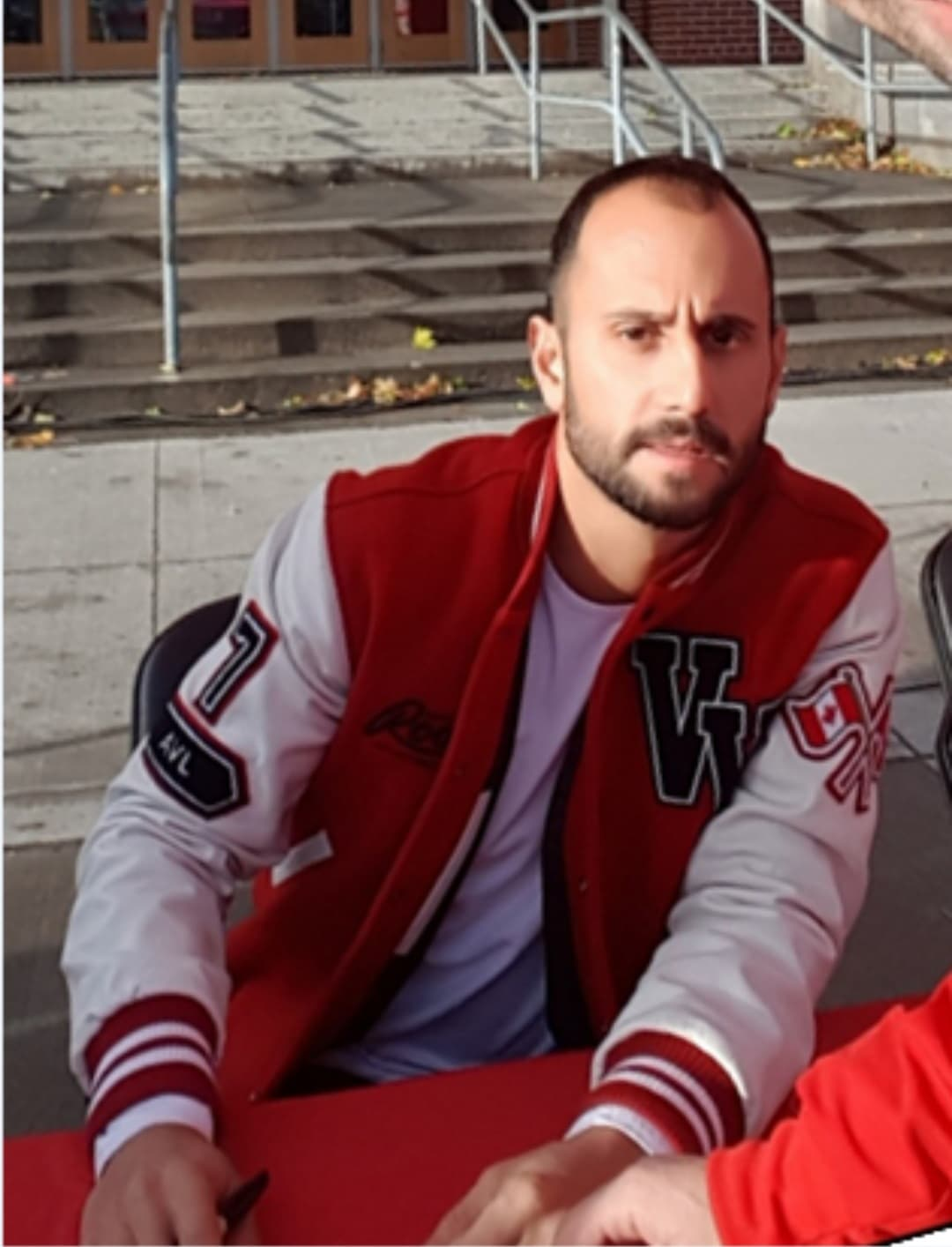
- Vázquez at an autograph signing for Toronto FC in 2018

Personal information
- Full name: Víctor Vázquez Solsona
- Date of birth: 20 January 1987 (age 39)
- Place of birth: Barcelona, Spain
- Height: 1.80 m (5 ft 11 in)
- Position: Attacking midfielder

Youth career
- 1993–1996: Martinenc
- 1996–1998: Damm
- 1998–2005: Barcelona

Senior career*
Years	Team	Apps	(Gls)
2005–2006	Barcelona C	29	(7)
2006–2011	Barcelona B	118	(12)
2008–2010	Barcelona	1	(0)
2011–2015	Club Brugge	121	(15)
2016–2017	Cruz Azul	19	(1)
2017–2018	Toronto FC	52	(16)
2019	Al-Arabi	7	(2)
2019–2020	Umm Salal	9	(0)
2020	Eupen	1	(0)
2021–2022	LA Galaxy	54	(5)
2023	Toronto FC	12	(0)
2024	East Bengal	10	(0)
2024–2025	Santa Coloma	18	(0)
Total		451	(58)

International career
2002	Spain U16	1	(0)
- * Club domestic league appearances and goals

Víctor Vázquez Solsona (born 20 January 1987) is a Spanish former professional footballer who played as an attacking midfielder.

After starting out at Barcelona, he went on to spend most of his career with Club Brugge, appearing in 165 competitive games with the latter club and winning the 2014–15 Belgian Cup. He also competed in Mexico, Canada, the United States, Qatar and Andorra, winning a domestic treble with Toronto FC in 2017.

== Club career ==
=== Barcelona ===
Born in Barcelona, Catalonia, Vázquez joined the youth system of FC Barcelona at the age of 11. At La Masia, he was part of the iconic class of 1987 team, playing alongside future first team players Cesc Fàbregas, Lionel Messi and Gerard Piqué, and being considered at one point to be the best player of the group, ahead of Messi. He progressed through the youth ranks, making his debut for the first team on 12 April 2008 after coming on as a substitute for Santiago Ezquerro in the final 15 minutes in a 2–2 La Liga away draw against Recreativo de Huelva. Pep Guardiola called him for the team's pre-season in the following campaign, where he appeared in three official games, but none in the domestic league.

Vázquez started and finished the 3–2 home loss to FC Shakhtar Donetsk on 9 December 2008, in the last UEFA Champions League group stage match, but was again mainly registered with the reserves. On 8 February of the following year he suffered a serious knee injury in a game with the latter, going on to miss the remainder of the season in Segunda División B.

Due to the lengthy calendar in 2009–10, many first-team players were given breaks towards the end of the year. Thus, on 29 December 2009, four Barça B players were called by Guardiola: Thiago Alcântara, Gai Assulin, Jonathan dos Santos and Vázquez; all returned to where they had come from the following month.

On 7 December 2010, after coming from the bench for fellow youth graduate Jeffrén Suárez, who suffered an early injury, Vázquez scored his first goal for Barcelona's first team, contributing to a 2–0 home win against FC Rubin Kazan in the Champions League group stage, as the hosts had already secured the first place in their group.

=== Club Brugge ===
In late April 2011, after 14 years at the Camp Nou (including youth years), Vázquez agreed to join Club Brugge KV, and a three-year contract was signed the following month. In March 2013 he extended his link until 2016, being considered a key player and essential to the further development of the squad according to sporting director Arnar Grétarsson.

At the end of the 2014–15 season, after again being first choice as his team won the regular season in the Belgian Pro League, eventually finishing second, and also capturing the Belgian Cup, Vázquez was voted the Belgian Professional Footballer of the Year. He also helped his side to a quarter-final run in the UEFA Europa League in his last year with the club and, across all competitions, made 173 appearances over five seasons, scored 25 goals and provided 50 assists, including seven goals and four assists in 33 matches in the latter tournament.

=== Cruz Azul ===
On 30 December 2015, Cruz Azul signed Vázquez to a three-year contract for US$1.5 million. His time in Mexico was largely unsuccessful, however, and he only made a limited number of appearances before leaving; he played 23 competitive games during his spell at the Estadio Azul, scoring once and providing one assist.

=== Toronto FC ===
Vázquez transferred to Canadian club Toronto FC on 20 February 2017. He scored his first goal on 18 March in a 2–0 away win over Vancouver Whitecaps FC. Throughout his first season in Major League Soccer, he drew praise in the media for adding depth to his new team's attacking play, courtesy of his vision and distribution, and formed a notable partnership in midfield with captain Michael Bradley, who was in turn freed from much of the team's creative responsibilities and played more of a defensive role, while still sharing some of the playmaking duties with the Spaniard; Vázquez's playmaking ability and link-up play with forwards Sebastian Giovinco and Jozy Altidore saw him finish as the second highest assist provider of the regular season (16) while also notching eight goals, as Toronto captured the Canadian Championship followed by the Supporters' Shield for most points in the league, after a 4–2 home win over New York Red Bulls on 30 September in which he scored from an injury time penalty.

In Toronto's last match of the regular season on 22 October 2017, a 2–2 away draw to Atlanta United FC, the former club broke the league's point record of 68 points, set by LA Galaxy in 1998, by one point. Eight days later, in the first leg of the Eastern Conference semi-finals in the play-offs, Vázquez scored the opening goal in a 2–1 away win over the New York Red Bulls. On 29 November, in the return leg of the Eastern final against Columbus Crew SC, at BMO Field, he missed a penalty in the 26th minute, but later set up the only goal of the match scored by Altidore, which saw his side emerge conference winners for the second consecutive year and earn a place in the MLS Cup Final. On 9 December, in the decisive match played at the same venue, he was involved in Altidore's opener and subsequently scored the final goal in a 2–0 win over the Seattle Sounders FC for an unprecedented domestic treble.

Vázquez's second season at the club was less successful however, as he struggled with injuries, collecting eight goals and nine assists in 21 MLS appearances and totalling matches 26 across all competitions. Although Toronto defended their Canadian Championship title, and even reached the final of the CONCACAF Champions League in 2018, with him starting in the second leg, they missed out on the playoffs for the first time in four years.

=== Qatar ===
On 15 January 2019, Vázquez signed with Al-Arabi SC of the Qatar Stars League. At the end of the season, he transferred to Umm Salal SC in the same competition.

=== Eupen ===
Vázquez returned to the Belgian top division in August 2020, joining K.A.S. Eupen on a two-year contract. Two months later, he asked to be released for personal reasons and left the club.

=== LA Galaxy ===
On 16 March 2021, Vázquez returned to MLS by signing with LA Galaxy, reuniting with former Toronto head coach Greg Vanney. He made his debut on 18 April against Inter Miami CF, and scored his first goal on 22 July in a 2–2 away draw with Real Salt Lake.

=== Return to Toronto ===
In November 2022, Toronto FC claimed the negotiation rights to Vázquez at the 2022 MLS Re-Entry Draft. The following month, he signed a one-year contract with an option for a further season to return to the club.

At the end of the 2023 campaign, Vázquez was not retained.

=== Later career ===
On 31 January 2024, Vázquez joined East Bengal FC from the Indian Super League, coached by his compatriot Carles Cuadrat who was also a product of Barcelona's youth system. That summer, the 37-year-old moved to the Andorran Primera Divisió with FC Santa Coloma.

== Style of play ==
A skilful and creative playmaker, Vázquez was noted for his vision, technique, passing and his composure in possession, which enabled him to link-up with other players, distribute the ball quickly and create goalscoring opportunities for his teammates. A team player, he also drew praise for his intelligence, work-rate, stamina, awareness, selflessness, movement off the ball and positional sense on the pitch, as well as for being a key dressing room personality. Although he was primarily known for his ability to create goals, he was capable of scoring them himself, and was also an accurate free kick and penalty taker. An experienced and versatile midfielder, he usually played as an attacking midfielder behind the strikers, but was also capable of playing in the centre in a 3–5–2 formation, or on the left wing in a 4–4–2 formation.

Vázquez was also occasionally used in a more advanced position, operating in a free, creative role, playing behind or off of another forward as a second striker.

== Personal life ==
Vázquez is married to Andrea. Their son Leo (born 2013) was named in honour of his childhood friend and former Barcelona teammate Messi.

Vázquez had the words "solo el mas fuerte sobrevive" (only the strongest survives) tattooed on his arm as he recovered from his second knee surgery. He also had several other tattoos which reference his wife, son, grandmother and sister, including the text "Life is meaningless without you, forever yours" on his back, dedicated to his wife.

== Career statistics ==
Appearances and goals by club, season and competition
Club	Season	League			National cup		Continental		Other (Note: Includes Supercopa de España, UEFA Super Cup, FIFA Club World Cup and MLS Cup playoffs)		Total	
Club	Season	Division	Apps	Goals	Apps	Goals	Apps	Goals	Apps	Goals	Apps	Goals
Barcelona C	2005–06	Tercera División	29	7	—		—		—		29	7
Barcelona B	2006–07	Segunda División B	29	1	—		—		—		29	1
Barcelona B	2007–08	Tercera División	27	9	—		—		—		27	9
Barcelona B	2008–09	Segunda División B	19	0	—		—		—		19	0
Barcelona B	2009–10	Segunda División B	18	1	—		—		—		18	1
Barcelona B	2010–11	Segunda División	25	1	—		—		—		25	1
Barcelona B	Total		118	12	—		—		—		118	12
Barcelona	2007–08	La Liga	1	0	0	0	0	0	0	0	1	0
Barcelona	2008–09	La Liga	0	0	0	0	1	0	0	0	1	0
Barcelona	2009–10	La Liga	0	0	0	0	0	0	0	0	0	0
Barcelona	2010–11	La Liga	0	0	0	0	1	1	0	0	1	1
Barcelona	Total		1	0	0	0	2	1	0	0	3	1
Club Brugge	2011–12	Belgian Pro League	35	6	1	0	11	1	—		47	7
Club Brugge	2012–13	Belgian Pro League	28	3	1	0	5	1	—		34	4
Club Brugge	2013–14	Belgian Pro League	20	2	1	0	1	0	—		22	2
Club Brugge	2014–15	Belgian Pro League	24	4	4	2	12	5	—		37	11
Club Brugge	2015–16	Belgian Pro League	14	0	1	0	8	1	—		23	1
Club Brugge	Total		121	15	8	2	37	8	—		166	25
Cruz Azul	2015–16	Liga MX	14	1	4	0	—		—		18	1
Cruz Azul	2016–17	Liga MX	5	0	0	0	—		—		5	0
Cruz Azul	Total		19	1	0	0	—		—		23	1
Toronto FC	2017	Major League Soccer	31	8	3	0	—		5	2	39	10
Toronto FC	2018	Major League Soccer	21	8	0	0	5	0	0	0	26	8
Toronto FC	Total		52	16	3	0	5	0	5	2	65	18
Al-Arabi	2018–19	Qatar Stars League	7	2	0	0	—		—		7	2
Umm Salal	2019–20	Qatar Stars League	9	0	3	0	—		—		12	0
Eupen	2020–21	Belgian Pro League	1	0	0	0	—		—		1	0
LA Galaxy	2021	Major League Soccer	28	3	—		—		—		28	3
LA Galaxy	2022	Major League Soccer	26	2	1	0	—		1	0	28	2
LA Galaxy	Total		54	5	1	0	—		1	0	56	5
Toronto FC	2023	Major League Soccer	12	0	0	0	—		0	0	12	0
East Bengal	2023–24	Indian Super League	10	0	0	0	—		0	0	10	0
Santa Coloma	2024–25	Primera Divisió	16	0	1	0	—		—		17	0
Santa Coloma	2025–26	Primera Divisió	2	0	0	0	0	0	—		2	0
Santa Coloma	Total		18	0	1	0	0	0	—		19	0
Career total			451	58	20	2	44	9	6	2	521	71

== Honours ==
Barcelona

- UEFA Champions League: 2008–09, 2010–11

Club Brugge

- Belgian Pro League: 2015–16
- Belgian Cup: 2014–15

Toronto FC

- MLS Cup: 2017
- Canadian Championship: 2017, 2018
- Supporters' Shield: 2017
- Trillium Cup: 2017
- Eastern Conference Championship (Playoffs): 2017

Individual

- Belgian Footballer of the Year: 2014–15
- MLS Best XI: 2017
- Red Patch Boys Player of the Year: 2017
