= Vadis Odjidja-Ofoe =

Belgian footballer

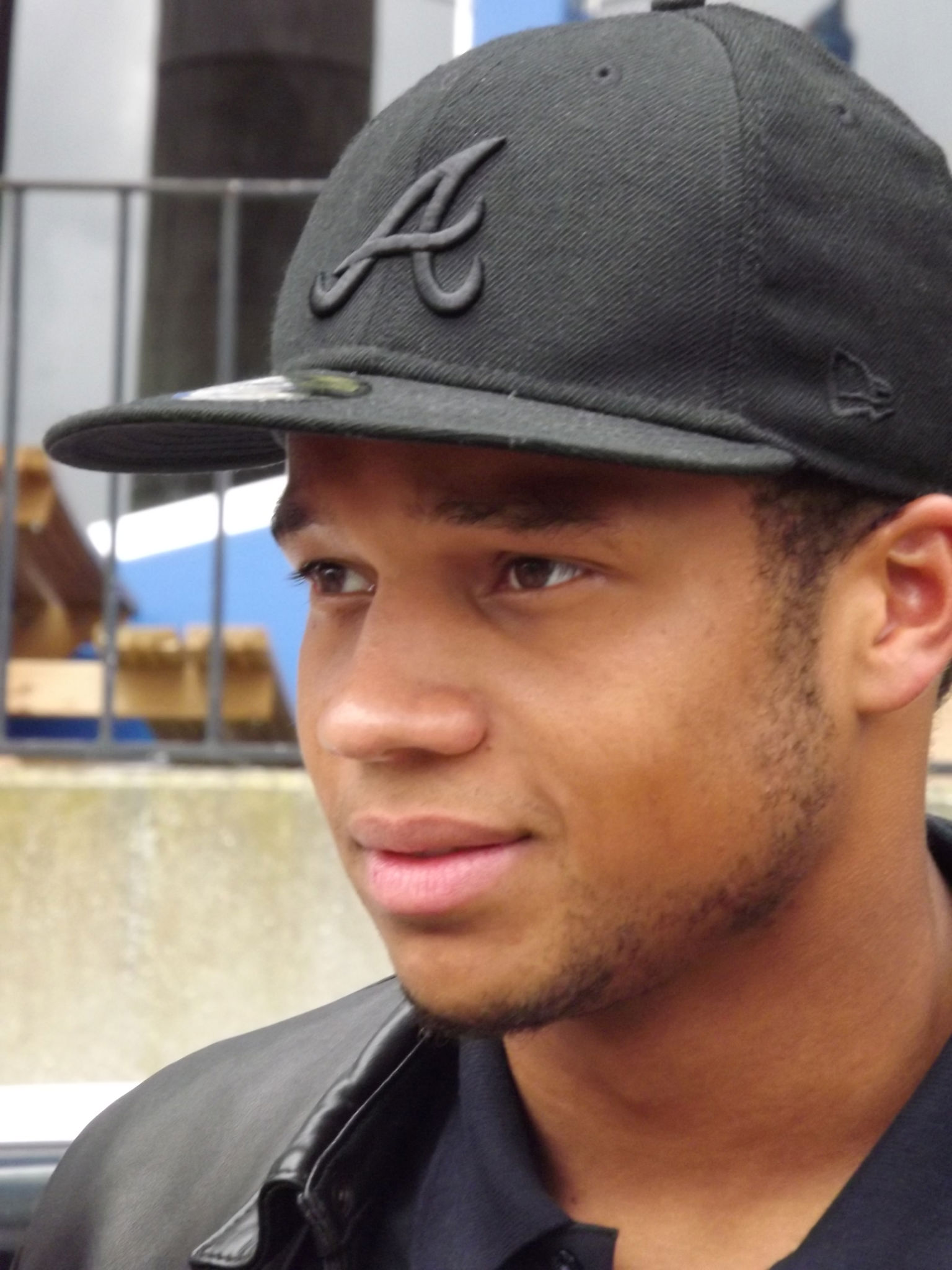
- Odjidja-Ofoe in 2012

Personal information
- Date of birth: 21 February 1989 (age 37)
- Place of birth: Ghent, Belgium
- Height: 1.85 m (6 ft 1 in)
- Position: Midfielder

Youth career
- 1994–1999: Gent
- 1999–2007: Anderlecht

Senior career*
Years	Team	Apps	(Gls)
2007–2008	Anderlecht	3	(1)
2008–2009	Hamburger SV	2	(0)
2008–2009	Hamburger SV II	12	(0)
2009–2014	Club Brugge	181	(22)
2014–2016	Norwich City	15	(0)
2015–2016	→ Rotherham United (loan)	4	(1)
2016–2017	Legia Warsaw	31	(4)
2017–2018	Olympiacos	18	(2)
2018–2023	Gent	137	(12)
2023–2024	Hajduk Split	25	(0)
2025–2026	Eendracht Aalst Lede	20	(0)

International career
2004	Belgium U15	3	(0)
2007	Belgium U18	3	(0)
2007	Belgium U19	9	(3)
2007–2009	Belgium U21	10	(0)
2010–2012	Belgium	3	(0)
- * Club domestic league appearances and goals

Vadis Odjidja-Ofoe (born 21 February 1989) is a former Belgian professional footballer who played as a midfielder.

== Club career ==
Odjidja-Ofoe joined the team of his birth area Gent at the age of five. Later on, he was transferred to Anderlecht. He was part of the 2006–07 Anderlecht reserves team that won the reserves championship. In the 2007–08 season, he was promoted to the first team of Anderlecht. On 22 December 2007, he scored his first goal on his full debut for RSCA against RAEC Mons.

In January 2008, he was signed by Hamburger SV. On 9 January 2009, he left Hamburg and moved for €900,000 to Club Brugge K.V. after one year in the Bundesliga.

Odjidja-Ofoe completed his move to English Championship side Norwich City in August 2014. He made his league debut for Norwich City on 16 September 2014 after coming on as a substitute in an away league match against Brentford. Injury hampered much of Odjidja-Ofoe's first season at Norwich City as they gained promotion to the Premier League. In September 2015, Odjidja-Ofoe moved to Rotherham United on a one-month loan, making four appearances and scoring one goal against Cardiff City.

In August 2016, Odjidja-Ofoe was transferred to Legia Warsaw for an undisclosed fee. Scoring five goals and providing 14 assists in 42 official appearances for Legia during the 2016–17 season, he was named Ekstraklasa Player of the Season and Midfielder of the Season.

On 9 July 2017, Olympiacos officially announced the purchase of Odjidja-Ofoe from Legia Warsaw for an estimated amount of €2.5 million. The 28-year-old Belgian international signed a three-year contract with the team managed by Besnik Hasi. On 16 August 2017, he scored his first goal with the club in a 2–1 comeback win over Rijeka in the first leg of UEFA Champions League play-offs. On 22 November 2017, in an away 3–1 loss UEFA Champions League Group stage game against Sporting, Odjidja-Ofoe bagged the only goal of the Reds.

On 21 July 2018, Gent officially announced the acquisition of Odjidja-Ofoe from Olympiacos on a two-year contract. Before the end of the previous season, Olympiacos had put the player out of Pedro Martins' plans for the coming season, forcing him to find a club to continue his career. Odjidja-Ofoe came close to Sporting CP, but the change in the executive staff of the club and the immediate removal of Siniša Mihajlović broke down the Belgian player's transfer to the Portuguese team. Eventually, the 29-year-old returned to his home country on behalf of Gent, with the transfer fee close to €2.2 million. He then played for Hajduk Split for one season, spent a year without a club, and finished his career with a season at Eendracht Aalst Lede, before retiring in 2026.

== International career ==
Odjidja-Ooe was called up to the Belgium national under 23 team for the 2008 Summer Olympics tournament. He participated in two games; a group stage win over hosts China and a 1–4 semi-final defeat against Nigeria.

In November 2010, he applied for a Ghanaian passport and suggested that he could be considered for representing Ghana at international football in the future. On 17 November, he made his debut for Belgium in an international friendly against Russia. He came on as a substitute for Eden Hazard in the 90th minute.

He made his second appearance for Belgium in an UEFA Euro 2012 qualifying game against Azerbaijan in March 2011, again coming on as a substitute in the 90th minute, this to replace Steven Defour. In his next international outing, he again replaced Defour, in the 63rd minute of a match against Kazakhstan. As a result of playing in the UEFA Euro 2012 qualifying games, Odjidja was no longer eligible to play for Ghana.

== Career statistics ==
As of match played 25 May 2024

Appearances and goals by club, season and competition
Club	Season	League			National cup (Note: Includes Belgian Cup, FA Cup, Polish Cup, Greek Football Cup, Croatian Football Cup)		League cup (Note: Includes EFL Cup)		Europe		Other		Total	
Club	Season	Division	Apps	Goals	Apps	Goals	Apps	Goals	Apps	Goals	Apps	Goals	Apps	Goals
Anderlecht	2006–07	Belgian First Division	0	0	0	0	—		0	0	1 (Note: Appearance in Belgian Super Cup)	0	1	0
Anderlecht	2007–08	Belgian First Division	3	1	1	0	—		0	0	0	0	4	1
Anderlecht	Total		3	1	1	0	—		0	0	1	0	5	1
Hamburger SV	2007–08	Bundesliga	2	0	0	0	—		1 (Note: Appearance in UEFA Cup)	0	—		3	0
Hamburger SV II	2007–08	Regionalliga	8	0	—		—		—		—		8	0
Hamburger SV II	2008–09	Regionalliga	4	0	—		—		—		—		4	0
Hamburger SV II	Total		12	0	—		—		—		—		12	0
Club Brugge	2008–09	Belgian Pro League	16	0	0	0	—		—		—		16	0
Club Brugge	2009–10	Belgian Pro League	35	4	3	0	—		12 (Note: Appearances in UEFA Europa League)	1	—		50	5
Club Brugge	2010–11	Belgian Pro League	37	6	2	0	—		7	0	—		46	6
Club Brugge	2011–12	Belgian Pro League	29	4	2	0	—		10	1	—		41	5
Club Brugge	2012–13	Belgian Pro League	31	5	2	1	—		9 (Note: Two appearances and one goal in UEFA Champions League, seven appearances in UEFA Europa League)	1	—		42	7
Club Brugge	2013–14	Belgian Pro League	30	3	2	0	—		—		—		32	3
Club Brugge	2014–15	Belgian Pro League	3	0	0	0	—		1	0	—		4	0
Club Brugge	Total		181	22	11	1	—		39	3	—		231	26
Norwich City	2014–15	Championship	5	0	0	0	1	0	—		—		6	0
Norwich City	2015–16	Premier League	10	0	1	0	2	0	—		—		13	0
Norwich City	Total		15	0	1	0	3	0	—		—		19	0
Rotherham United (loan)	2015–16	Championship	4	1	0	0	0	0	—		—		4	1
Legia Warsaw	2016–17	Ekstraklasa	31	4	1	0	—		10 (Note: Eight appearances and one goal in UEFA Champions League, two appearances in UEFA Europa League)	1	0	0	42	5
Olympiacos	2017–18	Super League Greece	18	2	1	0	—		10 (Note: Appearances in UEFA Champions League)	2	—		29	4
Gent	2018–19	Belgian Pro League	28	4	5	0	—		4	0	—		37	4
Gent	2019–20	Belgian Pro League	26	3	2	0	—		14	0	—		42	3
Gent	2020–21	Belgian Pro League	25	2	2	1	—		6 (Note: Two appearances in UEFA Champions League, four appearances and one goal in UEFA Europa League)	1	—		33	4
Gent	2021–22	Belgian Pro League	29	2	6	2	—		13 (Note: Appearances in UEFA Europa Conference League)	2	—		48	6
Gent	2022–23	Belgian Pro League	29	1	3	0	—		17 (Note: Two appearances in UEFA Europa League, fifteen appearances and two goals in UEFA Europa Conference League)	2	—		44	3
Gent	Total		137	12	18	3	—		54	5	—		204	20
Hajduk Split	2023–24	Croatian Football League	25	0	2	0	—		2	0	1 (Note: Appearance in Croatian Football Super Cup)	0	30	0
Eendracht Aalst Lede	2025–26	Belgian Division 3	19	0	1	0	—		0	0	—		20	0
Career total			446	42	35	4	3	0	116	11	2	0	599	57

== Honours ==
Anderlecht

- Belgian Super Cup: 2006

Legia Warsaw

- Ekstraklasa: 2016–17

Gent

- Belgian Cup: 2021–22

Individual

- Ekstraklasa Player of the Season: 2016–17
- Ekstraklasa Midfielder of the Season: 2016–17
- Ekstraklasa Player of the Month: November 2016
