= Boli Bolingoli =

Belgian footballer (born 1995)

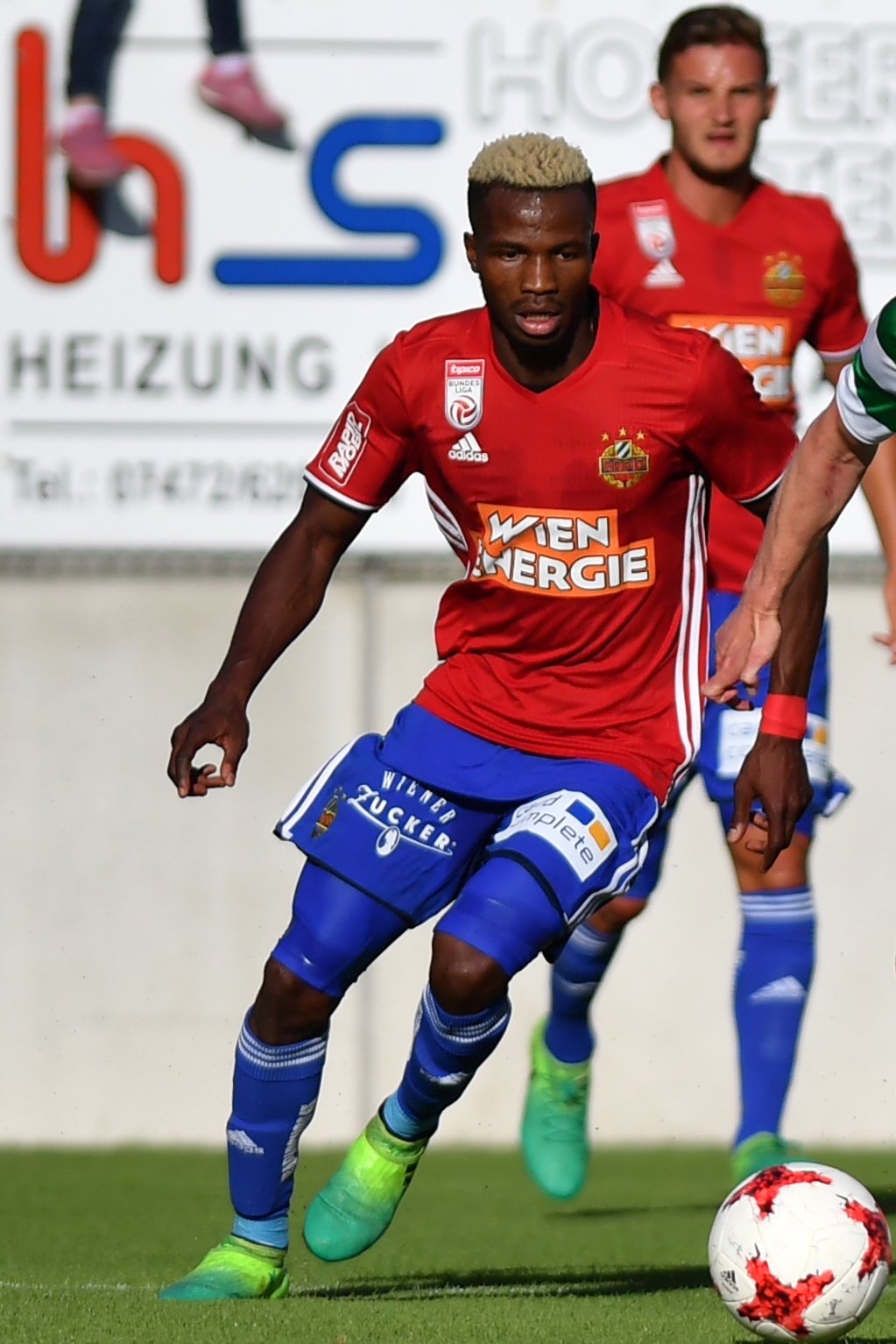
- Bolingoli with Rapid Wien in 2017

Personal information
- Date of birth: 1 July 1995 (age 31)
- Place of birth: Kinshasa, Zaire
- Height: 1.81 m (5 ft 11 in)
- Position: Left-back

Youth career
- 2010–2013: Club Brugge

Senior career*
Years	Team	Apps	(Gls)
2013–2017	Club Brugge	40	(1)
2017	→ Sint-Truiden (loan)	18	(0)
2017–2019	Rapid Wien	56	(3)
2019–2022	Celtic	17	(0)
2020–2021	→ İstanbul Başakşehir (loan)	12	(0)
2022	→ Ufa (loan)	0	(0)
2022–2024	Mechelen	31	(0)
2024–2026	Standard Liège	21	(0)
- * Club domestic league appearances and goals as of 23 May 2026

Boli Bolingoli-Mbombo (born 1 July 1995) is a professional footballer who plays as a left back.

== Career ==
=== Club Brugge ===
Bolingoli made his debut with Club Brugge on 26 July 2013 in the first game of the 2013–14 season against Sporting Charleroi replacing Maxime Lestienne in the 88th minute. Club Brugge won the game 2–0.

On 19 March 2015, he scored a brace against Beşiktaş in the UEFA Europa League round of 16, leading his team to qualify for the quarter-finals.

=== Celtic ===
On 3 July 2019, Bolingoli signed a four-year deal with Celtic.

On 19 September 2021, Bolingoli made his first competitive Celtic appearance back at the club following his loan spell at İstanbul Başakşehir, playing the full game against Livingston in a 1–0 defeat.

On 22 February 2022, Bolingoli was loaned to Russian Premier League club FC Ufa. On 1 April 2022, the loan was terminated early.

=== Mechelen ===
On 12 July 2022, Bolingoli joined Belgian First Division A club Mechelen on a permanent deal, signing a two-year deal and returning to Belgium after five years.

=== Standard Liège ===
On 5 July 2024, Bolingoli signed a two-year contract with Standard Liège.

== Personal life ==
Boli Bolingoli-Mbombo was born in Kinshasa, Democratic Republic of the Congo, on 1 July 1995. His younger brother, Emeraude, and his two cousins, Romelu and Jordan Lukaku, are also footballers, as was his uncle Roger Lukaku.

In August 2020, Bolingoli broke COVID-19 quarantine rules by making a trip to Spain, without notifying his club, before returning and playing against Kilmarnock on 9 August 2020. His actions caused First Minister, Nicola Sturgeon to call for the postponement of Celtic's next two games. He received a three-match ban from the Scottish FA for his actions.

Bolingoli is eligible to play for DR Congo through his parents.

== Career statistics ==
As of match played as of 14 November 2022

Appearances and goals by club, season and competition
Club	Season	League			National Cup		League Cup		Other		Total	
Club	Season	Division	Apps	Goals	Apps	Goals	Apps	Goals	Apps	Goals	Apps	Goals
Club Brugge	2013–14	Belgian Pro League	7	1	1	0	0	0	1 (Note: Appearance in UEFA Europa League)	0	9	1
Club Brugge	2014–15	Belgian Pro League	11	0	3	2	0	0	6	3	20	5
Club Brugge	2015–16	Belgian Pro League	14	0	1	0	1	0	7 (Note: Four appearances in UEFA Champions League, Three appearances in UEFA Europa League)	1	23	1
Club Brugge	2016–17	Belgian First Division A	8	0	1	0	0	0	3 (Note: Three appearances in UEFA Champions League, One appearance in Belgian Super Cup)	0	12	0
Club Brugge	Total		40	1	6	2	1	0	17	4	64	7
Sint-Truiden (loan)	2016–17	Belgian First Division A	8	0	0	0	0	0	10 (Note: Appearances in Europa League play-offs)	0	18	0
Rapid Wien	2017–18	Austrian Football Bundesliga	28	1	3	0	3	0	0	0	34	1
Rapid Wien	2018–19	Austrian Football Bundesliga	28	2	4	0	3	1	10 (Note: Appearances in Europa League)	0	45	3
Rapid Wien	Total		56	3	7	0	6	1	10	0	79	4
Celtic	2019–20	Scottish Premiership	14	0	1	0	2	0	11 (Note: Appearances in UEFA Champions League qualifiers)	0	28	0
Celtic	2020–21	Scottish Premiership	1	0	0	0	0	0	0	0	1	0
Celtic	2021–22	Scottish Premiership	2	0	0	0	0	0	0	0	2	0
Celtic	Total		17	0	1	0	2	0	11	0	31	0
İstanbul Başakşehir (loan)	2020–21	Süper Lig	12	0	0	0	—		6 (Note: Appearances in UEFA Champions League)	0	18	0
Mechelen	2022–23	Belgian Pro League	14	0	0	0	—		0	0	14	0
Career total			147	4	14	2	9	1	54	4	224	11

== Honours ==
Club Brugge

- Belgian Cup: 2014–15
- Belgian First Division A: 2015–16
- Belgian Super Cup: 2016

Celtic

- Scottish Premiership: 2019–20, 2021–22
- Scottish League Cup: 2019–20
