= Kehinde Fatai =

Nigerian footballer (born 1990)

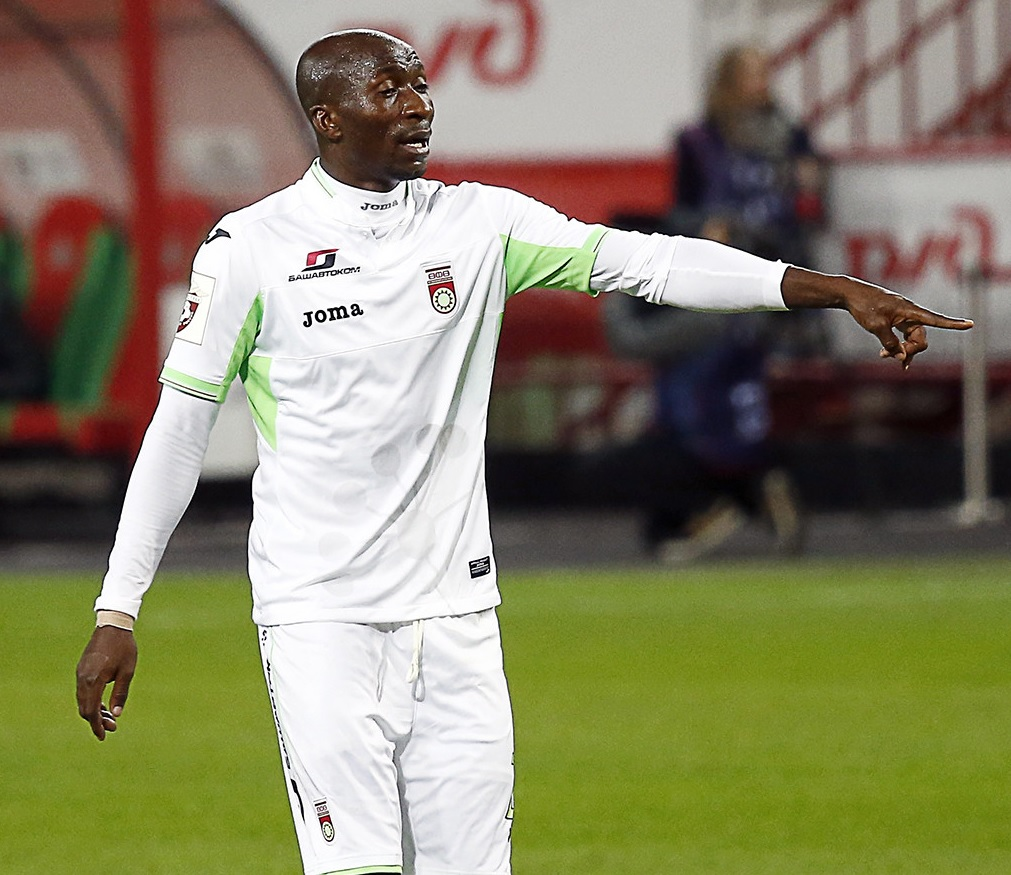
- Fatai with Ufa in 2016

Personal information
- Full name: Kehinde Abdul Feyi Fatai
- Date of birth: 19 February 1990 (age 36)
- Place of birth: Abuja, Nigeria
- Height: 1.78 m (5 ft 10 in)
- Position: Striker

Youth career
- –2007: JUTH
- 2007–2008: Farul Constanța

Senior career*
Years	Team	Apps	(Gls)
2007–2008	Farul II Constanța	20	(11)
2008–2010	Farul Constanța	46	(7)
2010–2015	Astra Giurgiu	114	(41)
2013–2014	→ Club Brugge (loan)	8	(1)
2015–2016	Sparta Prague	24	(8)
2016–2018	Ufa	41	(6)
2018–2019	Dinamo Minsk	32	(8)
2020–2021	Astra Giurgiu	14	(2)
2021–2022	Argeș Pitești	21	(2)
2022	Turan	5	(0)
2023–2024	Oțelul Galați	30	(4)
2024–2025	AEL	15	(6)
2025–2026	Afumați	20	(4)

International career
2009	Nigeria U20	3	(1)
2011–2012	Nigeria U23	7	(4)
- * Club domestic league appearances and goals as of 9 May 2026

Kehinde Abdul Feyi Fatai (born 19 February 1990) is a Nigerian professional footballer who plays as a forward.

== Club career ==
=== Early career and Farul Constanța ===
Fatai was born on 19 February 1990 in Abuja, Nigeria. He played junior-level football at JUTH. In July 2007, Fatai participated in a trial in Jos and was selected alongside three other compatriots by coach Marin Ion to be brought to Farul Constanța. Because the players were minors, Ion had to become their parent in order to transfer them to Farul.

Fatai helped Farul win the national junior championship in 2008 under the guidance of coach Gheorghe Butoiu. Simultaneously, he played senior-level football for the club's third-tier satellite team. Fatai made his Liga I debut for Farul's main squad on 20 April 2008, when Marin Ion sent him in the 90th minute to replace Marius Nae in a 3–2 away victory against Dacia Mioveni. Farul suffered relegation at the end of the 2008–09 season, but Fatai stayed with the club for one more season in the second league.

=== Astra Giurgiu and Club Brugge ===
On 16 June 2010, Fatai signed with Liga I club Astra Giurgiu on a free transfer, after his contract with Farul ended. He scored his first league goal for them by closing the scoring in a 2–2 draw against CFR Cluj. During the 2012–13 season, he netted a career-best 14 goals. Subsequently, he played six matches in the 2013–14 Europa League qualifying rounds, helping the team get past Domžale, Omonia Nicosia and AS Trenčín —with Fatai scoring once against the latter— before Astra was defeated by Maccabi Haifa in the play-off.

On 1 September 2013, Club Brugge confirmed Fatai's signing on a season long-loan from Astra for a €400,000 fee, with an option to buy. His debut in the Belgian Pro League took place on 22 September, as coach Michel Preud'homme sent him in the 80th minute to replace Tom De Sutter and seven minutes later he scored the final goal of the 4–0 win over rivals Anderlecht.

In 2014, Fatai returned to Astra and helped the team win the 2014 Supercupa României, during which coach Daniel Isăilă sent him on at halftime to replace Sadat Bukari in the victory against Steaua București. He scored a hat-trick against Slovan Liberec and one goal against Lyon, as his side got past those clubs in the 2014–15 Europa League qualifiers, reaching the group stage.

=== Sparta Prague ===
In May 2015, Fatai signed for Sparta Prague, which paid a €500,000 fee to Astra. His debut in the Czech First League took place on 24 July, when coach Zdeněk Ščasný sent him on at halftime to replace Markus Steinhöfer in a 0–0 draw against Vysočina Jihlava. In his following appearance, he closed the scoring in a 3–1 win over Baník Ostrava. Subsequently, he scored two goals in the 5–4 aggregate loss to CSKA Moscow in the 2015–16 Champions League third qualifying round. Because, as a striker, he scored only one goal in his first eight league matches for Sparta Prague, Fatai moved to play as a wide midfielder instead and went on to score five goals in three matches. Afterwards, he scored a goal in a victory over APOEL and a draw against Schalke 04, helping Sparta get past the 2015–16 Europa League group stage. The team then eliminated FC Krasnodar —against whom Fatai scored once— and Lazio before they were defeated by Villarreal in the quarter-finals.

=== Ufa ===
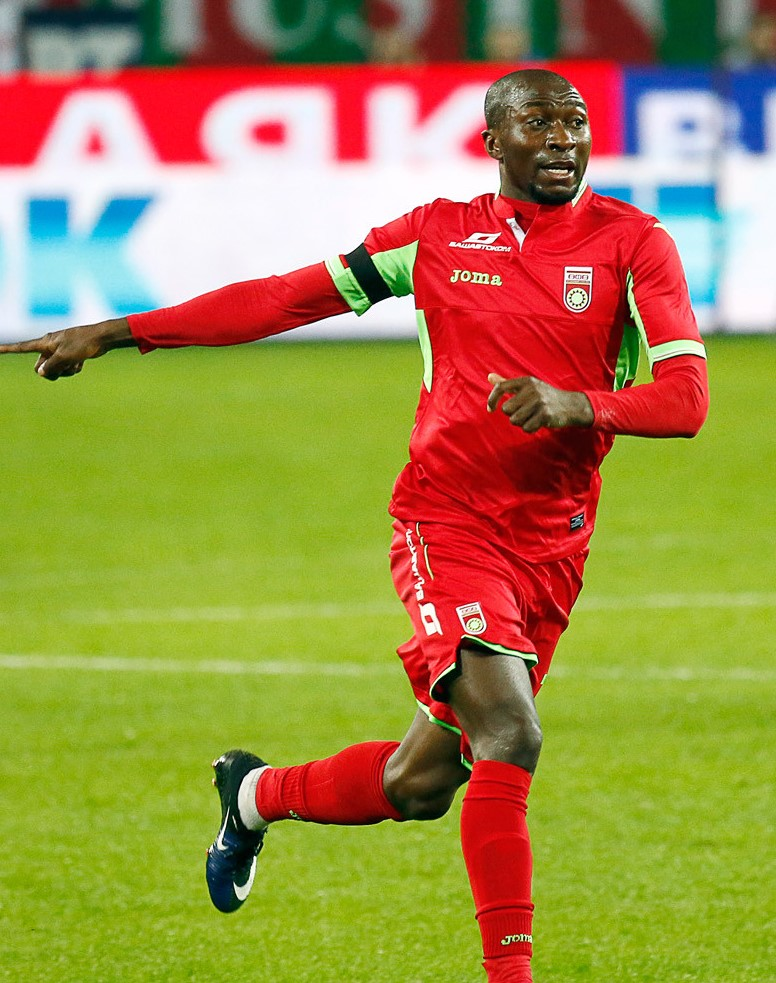
Fatai playing for Ufa

On 12 August 2016, Fatai joined Ufa, which paid €900,000 to Sparta for his transfer. He made his Russian Premier League debut on 20 August when coach Viktor Goncharenko sent him on as a 57th-minute substitute for Vyacheslav Krotov, and he managed to score a goal in a 3–1 loss to Terek Grozny. On 25 September, he netted the only goal of a 1–0 win over Spartak Moscow. He was released from his Ufa contract by mutual consent on 14 August 2018.

=== Dinamo Minsk ===
In August 2018, Fatai signed with Dinamo Minsk. His debut in the Belarusian First League took place on 15 September under coach Sergei Gurenko in a 0–0 draw against Shakhtyor Soligorsk. He scored his first goal in the competition on 30 September in a 2–1 away loss to BATE Borisov. On 20 October, he netted a hat-trick in a 3–3 draw against FC Minsk.

=== Return to Astra ===
In January 2020, Fatai returned to Astra Giurgiu. His first goal for them came on 23 February in a 2–2 draw against Sepsi Sfântu Gheorghe. In September 2020, Fatai and teammates Alexandru Ioniță and Takayuki Seto were provisionally suspended from playing due to intravenous vitamin therapy. On 9 April, Fatai received a one-year ban for doping from the Romanian Anti-Doping National Agency. Due to this suspension, he could not play in the 2021 Cupa României final, which was lost to Universitatea Craiova.

=== Argeș Pitești ===
On 24 September 2021, Fatai signed with Argeș Pitești. He netted his first goal for the team on 21 November in a 3–2 win against Universitatea Craiova.

=== Turan ===
In September 2022, Fatai went to play for Turan. On 11 September, he made his Kazakhstan Premier League debut, when coach Aleksandr Kuchma sent him on at halftime to replace Artyom Gurenko in a 3–1 home loss to Kairat. He played five matches in the competition without scoring.

=== Oțelul Galați ===
On 23 February 2023, Fatai returned to Romania and signed a contract with Oțelul Galați in Liga II. In the 2022–23 season, he helped the club gain promotion to the first league. Subsequently, Fatai made his last Liga I appearance on 27 January 2024 in Oțelul's 0–0 draw against Petrolul Ploiești, totaling 194 matches with 46 goals in the competition.

=== AEL and Afumați ===
On 1 February 2024, Fatai moved to the Greek second-tier club AEL. He helped the team gain promotion to the first league at the end of the 2024–25 season.

In July 2025, Fatai returned to Romania and joined Afumați for the 2025–26 Liga II season.

== International career ==
Fatai played three matches for Nigeria's under-20 team in the group stage of the 2009 FIFA U-20 World Cup, scoring once in a 5–0 win over Tahiti. He also played seven matches and scored four goals for Nigeria's under-23 side. In 2014, Fatai wanted to play for Romania, but FIFA rejected the move.

== Personal life ==
Fatai has a total of five brothers and a sister. His twin brother, Taiye, was a footballer who spent most of his career in the lower leagues of Romania. Another two of his brothers, Yunus and Kazeem, were also footballers who played mostly in the lower leagues of Romania.

== Career statistics ==
=== Club ===
Appearances and goals by club, season and competition
Club	Season	League			National cup (Note: Includes Cupa României, Belgian Cup, Czech Cup, Russian Cup, Belarusian Cup, Greek Cup)		Europe		Other		Total	
Club	Season	Division	Apps	Goals	Apps	Goals	Apps	Goals	Apps	Goals	Apps	Goals
Farul II Constanța	2007–08	Liga III	20	11	0	0	–		–		20	11
Farul Constanța	2007–08	Liga I	5	0	0	0	–		–		5	0
Farul Constanța	2008–09	Liga I	23	0	1	0	–		–		24	0
Farul Constanța	2009–10	Liga II	18	7	0	0	–		–		18	7
Farul Constanța	Total		46	7	1	0	–		–		47	7
Astra Giurgiu	2010–11	Liga I	27	7	1	0	–		–		28	7
Astra Giurgiu	2011–12	Liga I	30	10	2	1	–		–		32	11
Astra Giurgiu	2012–13	Liga I	33	14	4	2	–		–		37	16
Astra Giurgiu	2013–14	Liga I	3	3	–		6 (Note: Appearances in UEFA Europa League)	1	–		9	4
Astra Giurgiu	2014–15	Liga I	21	7	0	0	6	4	5 (Note: One appearance in Supercupa României, four appearances in Cupa Ligii and three goals)	3	32	14
Astra Giurgiu	Total		114	41	7	3	12	5	5	3	138	52
Club Brugge (loan)	2013–14	Belgian Pro League	8	1	2	0	–		–		10	1
Sparta Prague	2015–16	Czech First League	24	8	6	1	16 (Note: Two appearances and two goals in UEFA Champions League, fourteen appearances and three goals in UEFA Europa League)	5	–		46	14
Sparta Prague	2016–17	Czech First League	0	0	–		1 (Note: Appearance in UEFA Champions League)	0	–		1	0
Sparta Prague	Total		24	8	6	1	17	5	–		47	14
Ufa	2016–17	Russian Premier League	22	6	2	0	-		–		24	6
Ufa	2017–18	Russian Premier League	17	0	0	0	–		–		17	0
Ufa	2018–19	Russian Premier League	2	0	–		3	0	–		5	0
Ufa	Total		41	6	2	0	3	0	–		46	6
Dinamo Minsk	2018	Belarusian Premier League	9	5	3	0	–		–		12	5
Dinamo Minsk	2019	Belarusian Premier League	23	3	1	1	2	0	–		26	4
Dinamo Minsk	Total		32	8	4	1	2	0	–		38	9
Astra Giurgiu	2019–20	Liga I	10	2	–		–		–		10	2
Astra Giurgiu	2020–21	Liga I	4	0	0	0	–		–		4	0
Astra Giurgiu	Total		14	2	0	0	–		–		14	2
Argeș Pitești	2021–22	Liga I	21	2	2	0	–		–		23	2
Turan	2022	Kazakhstan Premier League	5	0	–		–		–		5	0
Oțelul Galați	2022–23	Liga II	12	3	–		–		–		12	3
Oțelul Galați	2023–24	Liga I	18	1	3	0	–		–		21	1
Oțelul Galați	Total		30	4	3	0	–		–		33	4
AEL	2023–24	Super League Greece 2	10	6	–		–		–		10	6
AEL	2024–25	Super League Greece 2	5	0	2	0	–		–		7	0
AEL	Total		15	6	2	0	–		–		17	6
Afumați	2025–26	Liga II	20	4	1	1	–		–		21	5
Career total			390	100	30	6	34	10	5	3	462	118

== Honours ==
Astra Giurgiu

- Cupa României runner-up: 2020–21
- Supercupa României: 2014

AEL

- Super League Greece 2: 2024–25
