= José Izquierdo (footballer, born 1992) =

Colombian footballer (born 1992)

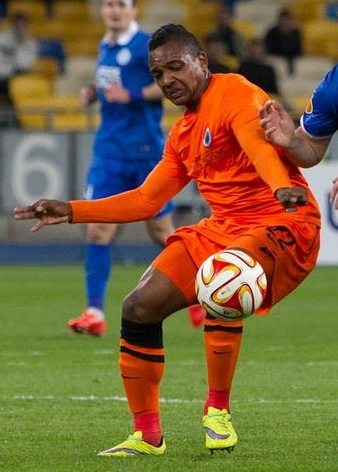
- Izquierdo playing for Club Brugge in 2015

Personal information
- Full name: José Heriberto Izquierdo Mena
- Date of birth: 7 July 1992 (age 34)
- Place of birth: Pereira, Colombia
- Height: 1.71 m (5 ft 7 in)
- Position: Left winger

Senior career*
Years	Team	Apps	(Gls)
2010–2013	Deportivo Pereira	69	(14)
2013–2014	Once Caldas	40	(12)
2014–2017	Club Brugge	84	(34)
2017–2021	Brighton & Hove Albion	48	(5)
2021–2022	Club Brugge	2	(0)
Total		243	(65)

International career^{‡}
2017–2018	Colombia	6	(1)
- * Club domestic league appearances and goals as of 15:16, 18 November 2021 (UTC) ‡ National team caps and goals as of 17 October 2018

José Heriberto Izquierdo Mena (born 7 July 1992) is a Colombian former professional footballer who played as a left winger.

== Club career ==
Izquierdo started playing football at an early age, starting out as a goalkeeper before moving outfield into a midfield and winger position. His parents initially wanted him to become a tennis player, however Izquierdo "constantly preferred to kick tennis balls with his feet rather than use rackets, and his teacher promptly advised him to switch to his natural sport". Izquierdo would subsequently abandon football for several years following his brother's death in a traffic accident, before eventually returning to join Deportivo Pereira.

Izquierdo joined Once Caldas in 2013 from Deportivo Pereira, and moved to Club Brugge one year later.

=== Club Brugge ===
In his first season with Club Brugge, the 2014–15 season, Izquierdo scored 13 Belgian Pro League goals for the club, and also made six UEFA Europa League appearances as Brugge finished top of their group in the group stage of the competition, advancing through to the quarter-finals before being knocked out by Ukrainian club FC Dnipro 1–0 on aggregate. Izquierdo started in both legs of the quarter-final.

Izquierdo won the Belgian Pro League with Club Brugge in the 2015–16 season, finishing top of the table in the regular season and winning the Championship play-offs with the club. He contributed 7 league goals in 24 Pro League appearances, and also made several appearances in Brugge's UEFA Europa League campaign. He was also the winner of the Belgian Golden Shoe award for 2016 in recognition of his performances throughout the season at Brugge.

Throughout the 2016–17 season, Izquierdo made 32 appearances for Club Brugge, scoring 14 Belgian First Division A goals to help them finish second in the league's regular season, these including braces against Oostende and Mouscron, as well as a hat-trick against Charleroi on 5 May 2017. He also scored one UEFA Champions League goal in a 2–1 defeat to English champions Leicester City on 22 November 2016. Izquierdo's goal against Leicester was described as "a thumping finish following a terrific solo run".

=== Brighton & Hove Albion ===
On 10 August 2017, it was announced that newly promoted Premier League club Brighton & Hove Albion had agreed a club record transfer fee with Club Brugge for Izquierdo, reported to be around £13.5 million. He joined Brighton subject to a medical, international clearance and a successful work permit application. Izquierdo passed his Brighton medical on 12 August 2017, with his work permit hearing scheduled for the following Wednesday. On 16 August 2017, Club Brugge confirmed that Izquierdo's work permit had been granted and that he would be joining Brighton. He was officially unveiled as a Brighton player on 21 August, taking the number 19 shirt and signing a four-year contract with the Albion.

Izqueirdo made his Premier League debut for Brighton on 26 August 2017, coming on as a second-half substitute in a 0–0 away draw against Watford.

On 20 October 2017, Izquierdo scored his first goal for Brighton in a 3–0 away win against West Ham United, a spectacular curled effort from distance. He scored his second league goal of the season on 20 November, the equalising goal in a 2–2 home draw against Stoke City. He scored another spectacular goal against West Ham on 3 February 2018, producing a moment of quality, curling it over everyone from the corner edge of the penalty area putting the Seagulls 2–1 ahead in an eventual 3–1 victory.

On 1 January 2018, Izquierdo provided two assists in Brighton's 2–2 home draw against AFC Bournemouth, winning the Man of the Match award.

Izquierdo has been hit by many injuries during his time in Sussex including having to have knee surgery and as a result of this and his other injuries he didn't play any games for the Seagulls in the 2019–20 season.

Izquierdo was still recovering from his injuries at the start of the 2020–21 season, however he returned to action with Brighton's U23s in the Premier League 2 picking up one goal and an assist in five appearances before another injury set back, this time to his hamstring in December 2020. He made his return to the senior matchday squad on 31 January 2021 in a home fixture against Tottenham Hotspur in which he remained an unused substitute in the 1–0 win.

Izquierdo made his first appearance for the first team in two–and–a–half years, returning from his injuries, coming on as a substitute in the 82nd minute for Leandro Trossard in the 1–0 away loss to already relegated Sheffield United on 24 April 2021. Speaking to The Argus during the week after his return to action, Izquierdo admitted that whilst injured he feared his career was over being told, "that there was the possibility of not playing again." In the same interview commenting on his speculation about his future at the club he admitted, "I'd prefer to stay in the Premier League for the rest of my life. For me it's the best league in the world."

After playing one game in the 2020–21 season after returning from a long period out due to injuries, it was announced on 4 June 2021 that Izquierdo was to be released when his contract expired on 30 June. With his injury-hit spell at the Seagulls lasting four seasons, he made 54 appearances, scoring five times and helping the club establish itself in the Premier League.

=== Return to Brugge ===
On 31 August 2021, Izquierdo returned to Club Brugge, where at first he was expected to continue recovering from his injuries and not immediately play. Nevertheless, Brugge registered him as a player with the league.

== International career ==
Izquierdo received his first callup to the Colombia national team for friendlies in June 2017 against Spain and Cameroon. He scored his first goal at international level in the friendly against Cameroon on 13 June 2017, the fourth goal in a 4–0 victory.

In June 2018 he was named in Colombia's 23-man squad for the 2018 FIFA World Cup in Russia. His only game was where Colombia lost to Japan 2–1 in their opening group game.

== Career statistics ==
=== Club ===
As of 24 November 2021

Appearances and goals by club, season and competition
Club	Season	League			National Cup		League Cup		Continental		Other		Total	
Club	Season	Division	Apps	Goals	Apps	Goals	Apps	Goals	Apps	Goals	Apps	Goals	Apps	Goals
Deportivo Pereira	2010	Categoría Primera A	9	1	0	0	—		—		—		9	1
Deportivo Pereira	2011	Categoría Primera A	21	1	6	1	—		—		—		27	2
Deportivo Pereira	2012	Categoría Primera B	24	10	2	0	—		—		—		26	10
Deportivo Pereira	2013	Categoría Primera B	15	2	6	0	—		—		—		21	2
Deportivo Pereira	Total		69	14	14	1	—		—		—		83	15
Once Caldas	2013	Categoría Primera A	16	3	5	1	—		—		—		21	4
Once Caldas	2014	Categoría Primera A	24	9	0	0	—		—		—		24	9
Once Caldas	Total		40	12	5	1	—		—		—		45	13
Club Brugge	2014–15	Pro League	32	13	6	2	—		6 (Note: Appearances in UEFA Europa League)	0	—		44	15
Club Brugge	2015–16	Pro League	24	7	6	0	—		6 (Note: One appearance in UEFA Champions League, five appearances in UEFA Europa League)	0	1 (Note: Appearances in the Belgian Super Cup)	0	37	7
Club Brugge	2016–17	First Division A	28	14	1	0	—		4 (Note: Appearances in UEFA Champions League)	1	1	1	34	16
Club Brugge	2017–18	First Division A	0	0	0	0	—		2	0	—		2	0
Club Brugge	Total		84	34	13	2	—		18	1	2	1	117	38
Brighton & Hove Albion	2017–18	Premier League	32	5	3	0	1	0	—		—		36	5
Brighton & Hove Albion	2018–19	Premier League	15	0	2	0	0	0	—		—		17	0
Brighton & Hove Albion	2019–20	Premier League	0	0	0	0	0	0	—		—		0	0
Brighton & Hove Albion	2020–21	Premier League	1	0	0	0	0	0	—		—		1	0
Brighton & Hove Albion	Total		48	5	5	0	1	0	0	0	0	0	54	5
Club Brugge	2021–22	First Division A	2	0	1	1	—		1	0	—		4	1
Career total			243	65	38	5	1	0	19	1	2	1	303	72

=== International ===
As of 3 July 2018

Colombia
Year	Apps	Goals
2017	2	1
2018	4	0
Total	6	1

Scores and results list Colombia's goal tally first.

No.	Date	Venue	Opponent	Score	Result	Competition
1	13 June 2017	Coliseum Alfonso Pérez, Getafe, Spain	Cameroon	4–0	4–0	Friendly

== Honours ==
Club Brugge

- Belgian First Division: 2015–16, 2021–22
- Belgian Cup: 2014–15
- Belgian Super Cup: 2016

Individual

- Belgian Golden Shoe: 2016
