= Brandon Mechele =

Belgian footballer (born 1993)

- Mechele with Belgium in 2026

Personal information
- Full name: Brandon Erik Mechele
- Date of birth: 28 January 1993 (age 33)
- Place of birth: Bredene, Belgium
- Height: 1.90 m (6 ft 3 in)
- Position: Centre-back

Team information
- Current team: Club Brugge
- Number: 44

Youth career
- 1999–2013: Club Brugge

Senior career*
Years	Team	Apps	(Gls)
2013–	Club Brugge	410	(24)
2016–2017	→ Sint-Truidense (loan)	18	(2)

International career^{‡}
2013–2014	Belgium U21	8	(0)
2019–	Belgium	21	(1)
- * Club domestic league appearances and goals as of 31 October 2026 ‡ National team caps and goals as of 15 November 2026

Brandon Erik Mechele (Dutch pronunciation: [ˈbrɛndən ˈmɛxələ]; born 28 January 1993) is a Belgian professional footballer who plays as a centre-back for Belgian Pro League side Club Brugge and the Belgium national team.

== Club career ==
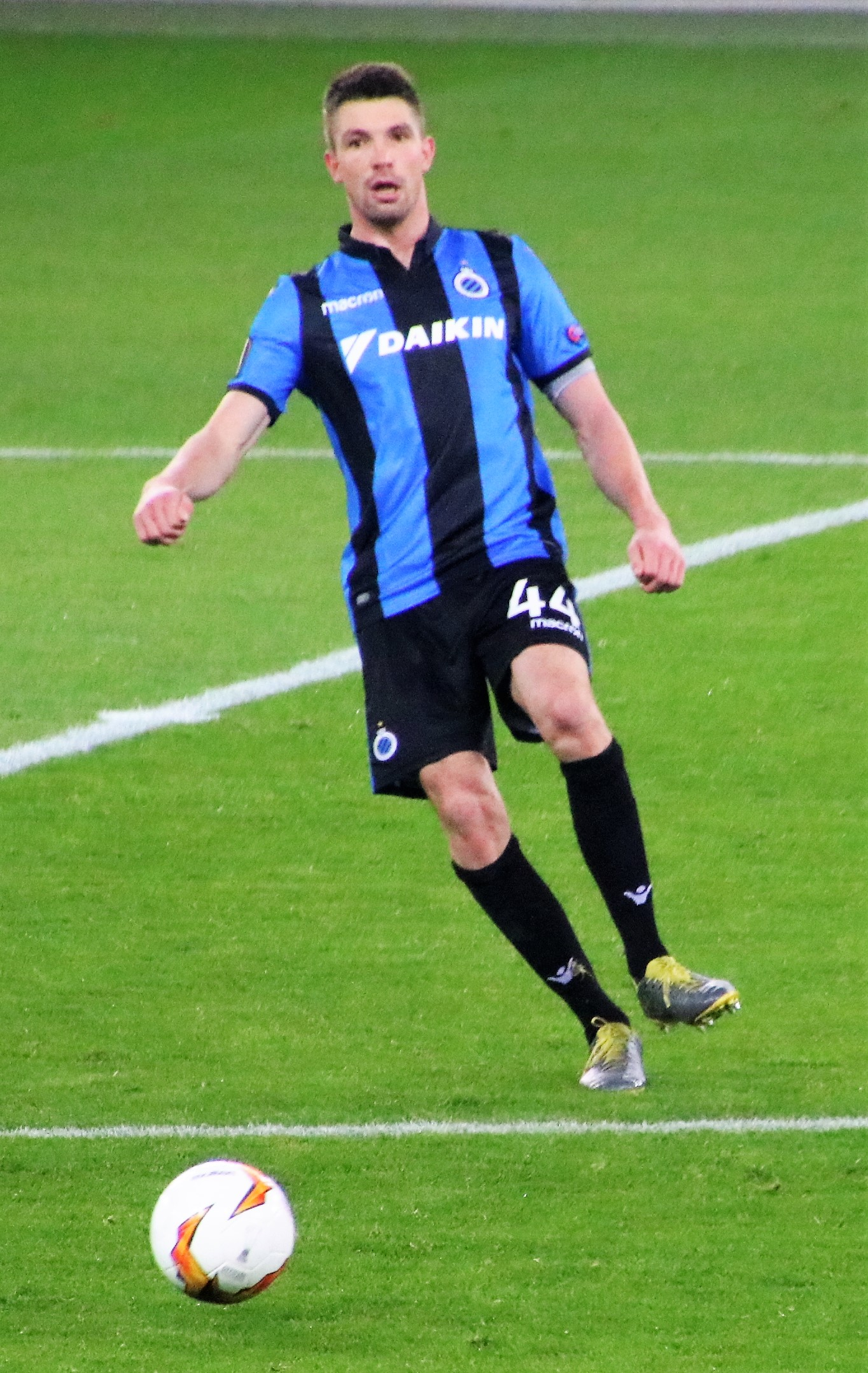
Mechele with Club Brugge in an UEFA Europa League game in 2019

Mechele joined Club Brugge at the age of six, progressing through the youth teams before making his senior debut against Lokeren in the Belgian Pro League play-offs in May 2013. He became a regular starter for Brugge in the 2013–14 season, making 28 appearances in all competitions. During the 2014–15 season, Mechele scored his first goal in a 2–1 win over Zulte Waregem and won his first trophy after beating Anderlecht in the final of the Belgian Cup. The following season, Mechele played 18 matches as Brugge won the 2015–16 Belgian Pro League.

After losing his place in the starting XI under coach Michel Preud'homme, Mechele spent the second half of the 2016–17 season on loan at Sint-Truiden. On his return to Brugge in 2017–18, Mechele played all 30 matches in the league and the ten play-off matches as the Blauw-Zwit won another Belgian championship. He went on to win three consecutive league titles between 2019–20 and 2021–22 as well as another title in 2023–24 and the 2024–25 Belgian Cup.

On 20 August 2025, Mechele made his 500th appearance for Brugge in a match against Rangers in UEFA Champions League qualifying, scoring the third goal of a 3–1 win in Glasgow.

== International career ==
Mechele playing for Belgium at the 2026 FIFA World Cup

Mechele earned his first full international call-up when Roberto Martínez named him in the Belgium national team squad in October 2018. He made his debut on 13 October 2019 in a Euro 2020 qualifier against Kazakhstan as a stoppage time substitute for Thomas Vermaelen.

On 18 November 2025, Mechele scored his first international goal in a 7–0 win over Liechtenstein during 2026 FIFA World Cup qualification.

On 15 May 2026, he was named in Belgium's squad for the 2026 FIFA World Cup. Aged 33, Mechele was the only player to complete all six of Belgium's matches, and also proved to be one of the revelations of the team.

== Career statistics ==
=== Club ===
As of match played 31 October 2026

Appearances and goals by club, season and competition
Club	Season	League			Belgian Cup		Europe		Other		Total	
Club	Season	Division	Apps	Goals	Apps	Goals	Apps	Goals	Apps	Goals	Apps	Goals
Club Brugge	2012–13	Belgian Pro League	3	0	0	0	0	0	—		3	0
Club Brugge	2013–14	Belgian Pro League	25	0	1	0	2 (Note: Appearances in UEFA Europa League)	0	—		28	0
Club Brugge	2014–15	Belgian Pro League	30	2	6	1	13	0	—		49	3
Club Brugge	2015–16	Belgian Pro League	18	0	2	0	9 (Note: Three appearances in UEFA Champions League, six appearances in UEFA Europa League)	0	1 (Note: Appearance in Belgian Super Cup)	0	30	0
Club Brugge	2016–17	Belgian Pro League	0	0	—		2 (Note: Appearances in UEFA Champions League)	0	0	0	2	0
Club Brugge	2017–18	Belgian Pro League	40	3	5	2	3 (Note: Two appearances in UEFA Champions League, one appearance in UEFA Europa League)	0	—		48	5
Club Brugge	2018–19	Belgian Pro League	32	0	1	0	7 (Note: Five appearances in UEFA Champions League, two appearances in UEFA Europa League)	0	0	0	40	0
Club Brugge	2019–20	Belgian Pro League	24	0	6	1	8 (Note: Six appearances in UEFA Champions League, two appearances in UEFA Europa League)	0	—		38	1
Club Brugge	2020–21	Belgian Pro League	35	2	3	0	4 (Note: Two appearances in UEFA Champions League, two appearances and one goal in UEFA Europa League)	1	—		42	3
Club Brugge	2021–22	Belgian Pro League	38	0	4	0	3	0	1	0	46	0
Club Brugge	2022–23	Belgian Pro League	36	2	2	0	8	0	1	0	47	2
Club Brugge	2023–24	Belgian Pro League	40	5	5	0	16 (Note: Appearances in UEFA Europa Conference League)	1	—		61	6
Club Brugge	2024–25	Belgian Pro League	40	3	5	0	12	0	1	0	58	3
Club Brugge	2025–26	Belgian Pro League	39	5	3	1	14	2	1	0	57	8
Club Brugge	2026–27	Belgian Pro League	10	2	0	0	3	0	1	0	14	2
Club Brugge	Total		410	24	43	5	104	4	6	0	563	33
Sint-Truidense (loan)	2016–17	Belgian Pro League	17	2	0	0	—		1 (Note: Appearance in Belgian Pro League Europa League play-offs)	0	18	2
Career total			427	26	43	5	104	4	7	0	581	35

=== International ===
As of match played 15 November 2026

Appearances and goals by national team and year
National team	Year	Apps	Goals
Belgium	2019	1	0
Belgium	2020	2	0
Belgium	2021	0	0
Belgium	2022	0	0
Belgium	2023	0	0
Belgium	2024	0	0
Belgium	2025	3	1
Belgium	2026	15	0
Total		21	1

Scores and results list Belgium's goal tally first.

List of international goals scored by Brandon Mechele
No.	Date	Venue	Opponent	Score	Result	Competition
1.	18 November 2025	Stade Maurice Dufrasne, Liège, Belgium	Liechtenstein	4–0	7–0	2026 FIFA World Cup qualification

== Honours ==
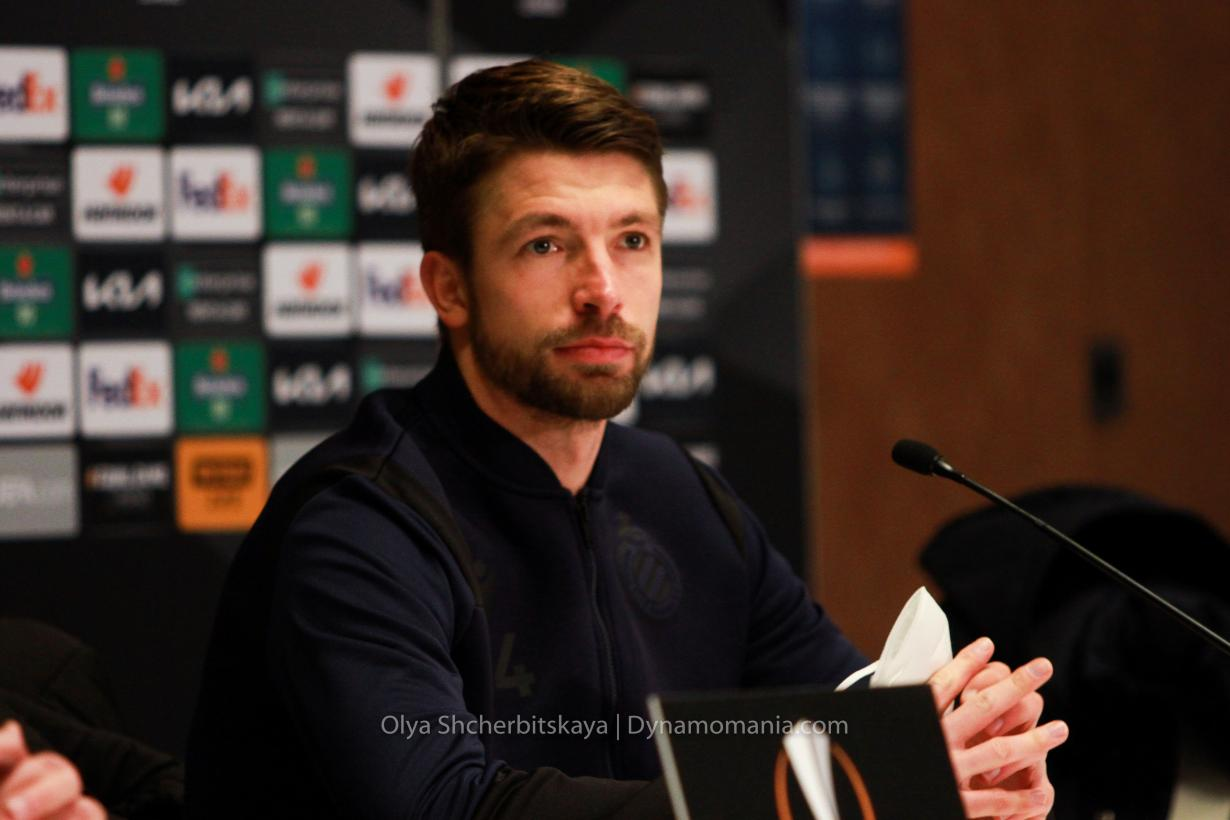
Mechele during an interview in 2021

Club Brugge

- Belgian Pro League: 2015–16, 2017–18, 2019–20, 2020–21, 2021–22, 2023–24, 2025–26
- Belgian Cup: 2014–15, 2024–25
- Belgian Super Cup: 2021, 2022, 2025

Individual

- Honorary Citizen of Bredene, Belgium: 2019
