= Jesper Jørgensen =

Danish footballer (born 1984)

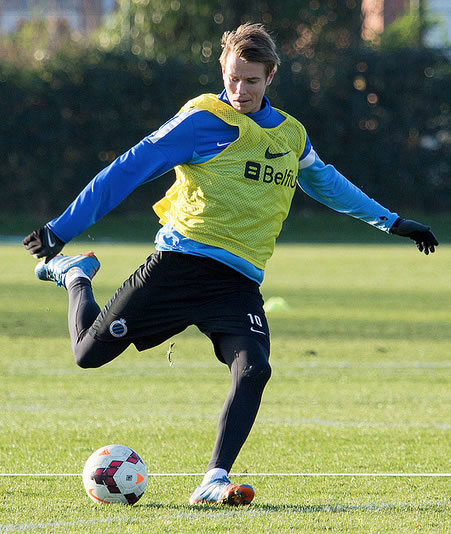
- Jørgensen with Club Brugge in 2014

Personal information
- Full name: Jesper Jørgensen
- Date of birth: 9 May 1984 (age 42)
- Place of birth: Varde, Denmark
- Height: 1.84 m (6 ft 0 in)
- Position: Midfielder

Youth career
- JBS
- 2002–2003: Varde IF

Senior career*
Years	Team	Apps	(Gls)
2003–2010	Esbjerg fB	173	(9)
2011–2012	Gent	60	(14)
2012–2014	Club Brugge	75	(10)
2014–2016	Zulte Waregem	36	(2)
2016–2018	Esbjerg fB	34	(1)
Total		378	(36)

International career
2001–2002	Denmark U19	4	(0)
2003	Denmark U20	4	(0)
- * Club domestic league appearances and goals

Jesper Jørgensen (Danish pronunciation: [ˈjespɐ ˈjɶɐ̯ˀɐnsn̩]; born 9 May 1984) is a Danish former professional footballer who played as a midfielder.

== Club career ==
=== Esbjerg ===
Jørgensen began his career with Janderup Billum Samarbejde (JBS) and signed for local rivals Varde IF in July 2002. After one year, Jørgensen left his hometown Varde to sign with regional powerhouse Esbjerg fB in summer 2003. On 5 January 2005, he signed a two-and-a-half-year contract extension with the club. He lost two cup finals with Esbjerg, both in 2005–06 and 2007–08.

=== Belgium ===
After 201 matches for Esbjerg, Jørgensen announced his move to Belgian club Gent on 10 December 2010, where he would sign a two-and-a-half-year contract. He made his first-team debut on 20 January 2011 against Sint-Truiden. He remained, except for the away game against Germinal Beerschot, in the starting lineup for the rest of the regular season. He also remained a starter in the relatively unsuccessful play-offs for Gent.

Jørgensen also remained a starter under new head coaches Francky Dury and Trond Sollied. He also hardly missed a game in the Belgian First Division A in the 2011–12 season. He also managed to significantly improve his scoring ability compared to his first six months at the club by scoring 13 times in 39 league games that season and was thus one of the key players in the team.

In June 2012, Club Brugge announced that Jørgensen signed a three-year contract with the club. In 2014, Jørgensen signed a two-year contract with Zulte Waregem on 1 September 2014.

=== Return to Esbjerg ===
On 11 January 2016, Jørgensen's move back to Esbjerg fB was confirmed by the club. He joined on an agreement that valid until the summer of 2018.

He left Esbjerg fB in February 2018 due to a recurring knee injury, which also resulted in him retiring from football.

== International career ==
Jørgensen played internationally for the Denmark under-19 team in four matches and also gained four caps for the under-20 team.
