= Lior Refaelov =

Israeli footballer (born 1986)

Lior Refaelov ליאור רפאלוב
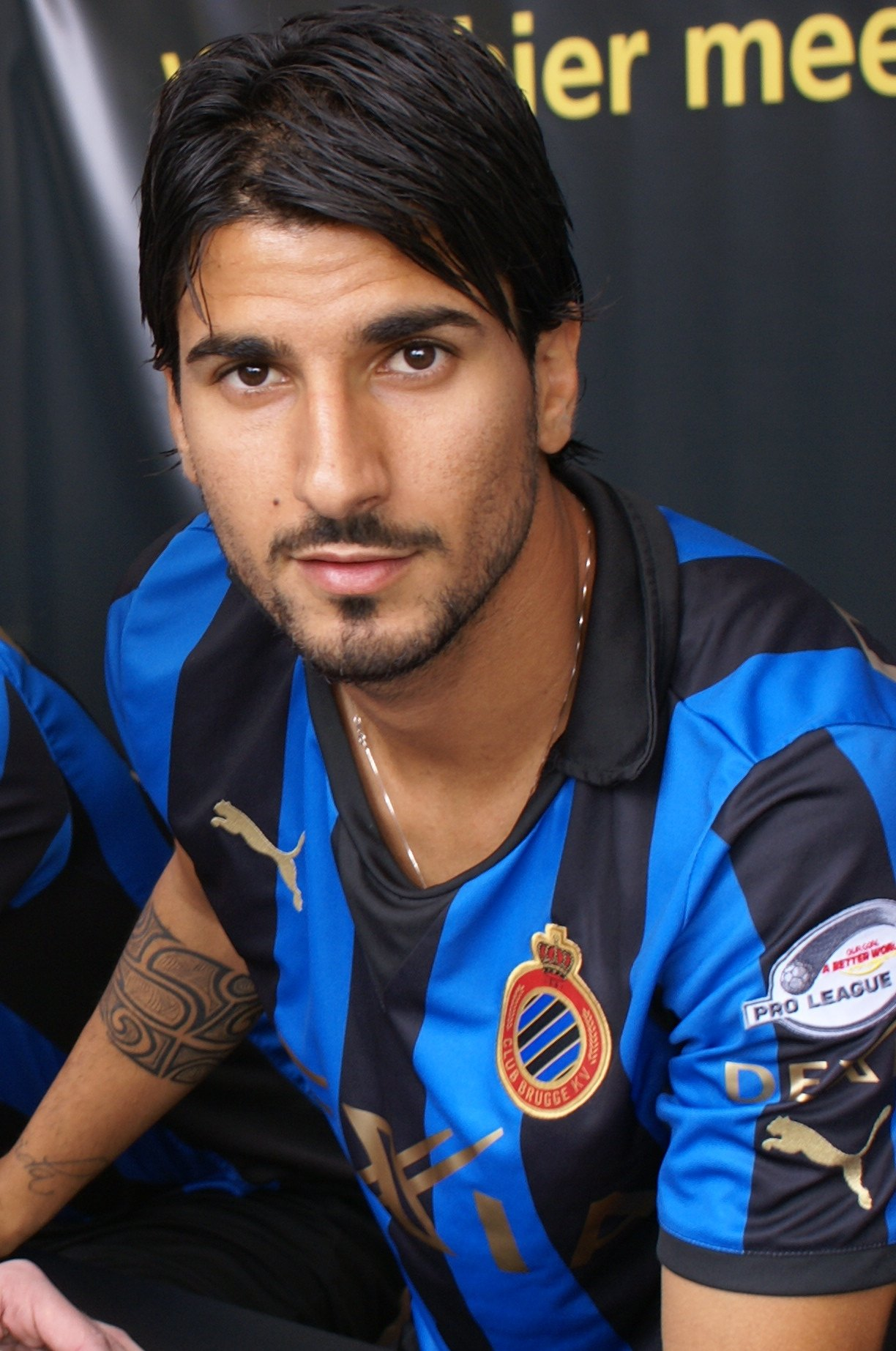
- Refaelov with Club Brugge in 2011

Personal information
- Full name: Lior Refaelov
- Date of birth: 26 April 1986 (age 40)
- Place of birth: Or Akiva, Israel
- Height: 1.76 m (5 ft 9 in)
- Positions: Attacking midfielder; winger

Youth career
- 1998–2004: Maccabi Haifa

Senior career*
Years	Team	Apps	(Gls)
2004–2011	Maccabi Haifa	194	(32)
2011–2018	Club Brugge	234	(53)
2018–2021	Royal Antwerp	112	(38)
2021–2023	Anderlecht	91	(25)
2023–2025	Maccabi Haifa	54	(18)
Total		685	(158)

International career^{‡}
2002–2003	Israel U17	13	(4)
2004	Israel U18	4	(1)
2004	Israel U19	9	(2)
2006–2008	Israel U21	17	(4)
2007–2017	Israel	40	(6)
- * Club domestic league appearances and goals as of 22 June 2025 ‡ National team caps and goals as of 14 April 2017

Lior Refaelov (or Rafaelov, Hebrew: ליאור רפאלוב; born 26 April 1986) is an Israeli former professional footballer who plays as an attacking midfielder or as a winger.

He began his career at Maccabi Haifa, where he won the Israeli Premier League three times. In 2011, he transferred to Club Brugge for €2.5 million. With the Belgian side, he won two first division titles in 2016 and 2018 and scored the winning goal in the Belgian Cup final in 2015.

Refaelov made his senior international debut in 2007, and has since earned 40 caps and scored 6 goals for the Israel national team.

== Early and personal life ==
Refaelov was born in Or Akiva, Israel, to Mountain Jewish (Kavkazim) parents who immigrated from Derbent, Dagestan to Israel prior to his birth.

He married his Israeli girlfriend Gal (née Aviv) in 2012.

== Club career ==
In 1998, Refaelov began to play in Maccabi Haifa youth teams. In the 2002–03 season he moved up from the under-16 team to the youth team of the club, and scored in his first match against Neve Yossef.

During the 2003–04 season he scored 7 goals in the youth team, lead it to the youth championship and won the best player award.

=== Maccabi Haifa ===
Refaelov scored his first goal in the senior during the 2005–06 season on a penalty kick against Hapoel Nazareth Illit, a game which Haifa won 6–0.

In the 2008–09 season, he finished with 9 goals as Maccabi Haifa won the Israeli league championship for the 11th time.

At the conclusion of the 2010–11 season, he was voted 'Player of the Year' in the Israeli football.

Between 2004 and 2011, he proudly wore the Maccabi Haifa Football Club jersey, contributing significantly to the team's triumphs in the Israeli Premier League, securing the title thrice.

=== Club Brugge ===
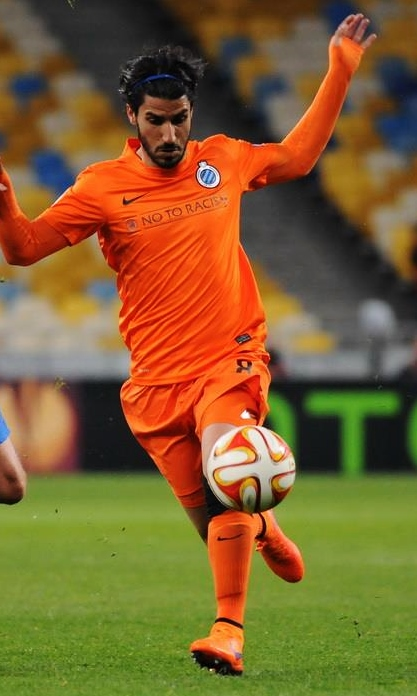
Refaelov playing for Club Brugge in 2015

On 20 June 2011, Refaelov signed with Belgian Pro League side Club Brugge for a fee of €4 million euro and 15% from the next sale.

In his first season with the Brugge he scored 7 goals and made 9 assists in all club competition as the club finished as runners-up in the Belgian league. In the next season, Refalov had a great form as he scored 12 goals and made 10 assists. In the 2013–14 season he scored 5 goals and made 14 assists and was one of the most valuable players of the club as they finished third in the league.

On 6 November 2014, he scored a hat-trick as Brugge won 4–0 away to FC Copenhagen to go top of their UEFA Europa League group.

On 22 March 2015, he scored with an added-time volley the winning goal in the Belgian Cup final, as Brugge defeated Anderlecht for their first trophy in eight years.

A year later he repeated the feat, scoring in the 2016 Belgian Cup Final, however this time around Club Brugge lost the final 1–2 to Standard Liège. That same season, he helped Club Brugge win their first league title in 11 years, making 15 league appearances as the club edged out Gent in the final days of the campaign.

=== Royal Antwerp ===
On 30 August 2018, Refaelov joined fellow Belgian First Division A side Royal Antwerp on an initial season-long loan. He scored his first goal for the club in a 5–1 league victory over Zulte Waregem on 16 September. On 9 December, Refaelov netted twice in a 3–0 victory over Cercle Brugge K.S.V., moving within four points of league leaders Genk through 18 matches.

In May 2019, Refaelov made his move to Antwerp permanent, signing a contract with the club until 2021. On 1 August 2020, Refaelov scored the only goal in a 1–0 win over his former team Club Brugge in the 2020 Belgian Cup Final. On 29 October 2020, he scored the only goal in a 1–0 win over Tottenham Hotspur in the 2020–21 UEFA Europa League.

In January 2021, he was awarded with the Belgian Golden Shoe for 2020. He became the third Antwerp player to win the Golden Boot and the first since Wilfried Van Moer in 1966. Refaelov collected 271 points from the 196 ballots, ahead of Beerschot midfielder Raphael Holzhauser (187) and the prolific Genk striker Paul Onuachu (86).

Refaelov helped Antwerp qualify for the 2020-21 Belgian Pro League title play-offs, but was dropped from the squad completely after announcing he would be moving to Anderlecht in the summer.

=== Anderlecht ===
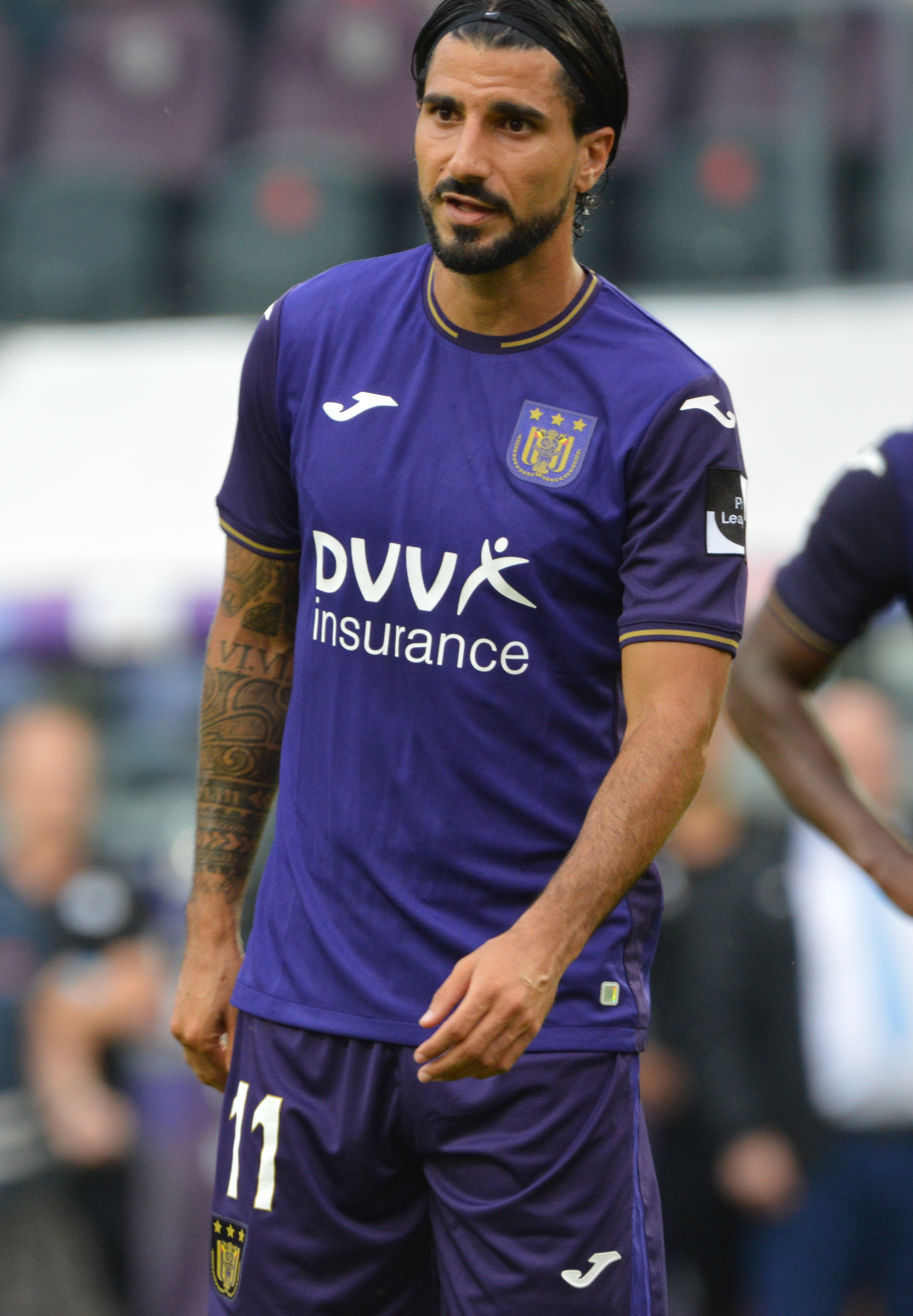
Refaelov playing for RSC Anderlecht in 2021

On 26 April 2021, it was announced that Refaelov would move to Belgian First Division A side Anderlecht on 1 July, signing a two-year contract. On 5 December 2021, Refaelov scored a brace in a 3–2 home win against Zulte Waregem.

Refaelov was a regular starter under Vincent Kompany as Anderlecht finished third in the Israeli's first season at the club for 2021–22, scoring 19 goals and supplying six assists in all competitions in the process, Refaelov's best-ever goals tally for a single season.

But continuing boardroom upheaval and the re-emergence as a force of neighbours Union St-Gilloise, who had beaten Anderlecht a record four times in the league campaign, resulting in Kompany being let go at the end of the season, moving to Burnley. Replacements Felice Mazzu and Brian Riemer failed to make waves domestically with Anderlecht slumping to 11th in 2022–23, their lowest finish since 1937.

Despite reaching the quarter-finals of the UEFA Conference League, only losing to AZ Alkmaar on penalties in the last-eight, Refaelov was released at the end of the 2022–23 season.

== International career ==
Refaelov represented Israel in the 2003 UEFA European Under-17 Championship in Portugal, scoring his international youth side's only goal in the tournament in a 1–2 loss to England U-17 on 7 May 2003.

As part of the Israel U-21, he won the Valeri Lobanovsky Memorial Tournament 2006.

He made his debut for the Israeli senior national side in a friendly against Belarus on 22 August 2007, replacing Idan Tal for the last nine minutes of a 1–2 away defeat. His next appearance came in another friendly match on 27 May 2010, against Uruguay at the Estadio Centenario in Montevideo; he scored the equaliser in a 1–4 away defeat.

On 15 March 2022, Refaelov announced his retirement from the Israel national team.

== Career statistics ==
=== Club ===
As of match played 26 February 2022

Appearances and goals by club, season and competition
Club	Season	League			National Cup		Europe		Other		Total	
Club	Season	Division	Apps	Goals	Apps	Goals	Apps	Goals	Apps	Goals	Apps	Goals
Maccabi Haifa	2004–05	Israeli Premier League	2	0			—				2	0
Maccabi Haifa	2005–06	Israeli Premier League	19	1			—				19	1
Maccabi Haifa	2006–07	Israeli Premier League	25	1			—				25	1
Maccabi Haifa	2007–08	Israeli Premier League	27	3			—				27	3
Maccabi Haifa	2008–09	Israeli Premier League	33	9			—				33	9
Maccabi Haifa	2009–10	Israeli Premier League	34	7			12 (Note: Appearance(s) in UEFA Champions League)	1			46	8
Maccabi Haifa	2010–11	Israeli Premier League	27	11			2 (Note: Appearance(s) in UEFA Europa League)	0			29	11
Maccabi Haifa	Total		167	32			14	1			181	33
Club Brugge	2011–12	Belgian Pro League	32	6	2	0	12	1	6 (Note: Appearances in Belgian Pro League play-offs)	0	46	7
Club Brugge	2012–13	Belgian Pro League	28	10	1	0	7 (Note: Two appearances in UEFA Champions League, five appearances and two goals in UEFA Europa League)	2	8	1	36	12
Club Brugge	2013–14	Belgian Pro League	33	4	2	0	2	1	9	2	37	5
Club Brugge	2014–15	Belgian Pro League	30	10	4	2	14	6	9	4	38	18
Club Brugge	2015–16	Belgian Pro League	15	6	5	1	1	0	4	1	21	7
Club Brugge	2016–17	Belgian Pro League	21	2	1	0	1	0	4 (Note: One appearance in Belgian Super Cup, three appearances in Belgian Pro League play-offs)	0	24	2
Club Brugge	2017–18	Belgian Pro League	18	2	0	0	4	0	7	2	22	4
Club Brugge	Total		177	40	15	3	41	10	47	10	224	53
Royal Antwerp (loan)	2018–19	Belgian Pro League	34	10	1	0	0	0	1	1	36	11
Royal Antwerp	2019–20	Belgian Pro League	24	11	5	2	4	0	—		33	13
Royal Antwerp	2020–21	Belgian Pro League	33	9	2	0	8	5	—		43	14
Royal Antwerp	Total		91	30	8	2	12	5	1	1	112	38
Anderlecht	2021–22	Belgian Pro League	37	12	6	5	3 (Note: Appearances in UEFA Europa Conference League)	2	0	0	46	19
Career total			406	102	27	10	70	18	48	11	551	141

=== International ===
Scores and results list Israel's goal tally first, score column indicates score after each Refaelov goal.

List of international goals scored by Lior Refaelov
No.	Date	Venue	Opponent	Score	Result	Competition
1	26 May 2010	Estadio Centenario, Montevideo, Uruguay	Uruguay	1–1	1–4	Friendly
2	17 November 2010	Bloomfield Stadium, Tel Aviv, Israel	Iceland	3–0	3–2	Friendly
3	11 October 2011	Ta' Qali National Stadium, Mdina, Malta	Malta	1–0	2–0	UEFA Euro 2012 qualification
4	6 February 2013	Netanya Stadium, Netanya, Israel	Finland	2–1	2–1	Friendly
5	26 March 2013	Windsor Park, Belfast, Northern Ireland	Northern Ireland	1–0	2–0	2014 FIFA World Cup qualification – UEFA
6	24 March 2017	El Molinón, Gijón, Spain	Spain	1–3	1–4	2018 FIFA World Cup qualification – UEFA

== Honours ==
Maccabi Haifa

- Israeli Premier League: 2005–06, 2008–09, 2010–11
- Israel Toto Cup (Ligat Ha'Al): 2005–06
- Israel Super Cup: 2023

Club Brugge

- Belgian Pro League: 2015–16, 2017–18
- Belgian Cup: 2014–15
- Belgian Super Cup: 2016

Royal Antwerp

- Belgian Cup: 2019–20

Individual

- Footballer of the Year in Israel: 2010–11
- Belgian Pro League Player of the Month: March 2014
- Belgian Golden Shoe: 2020

== See also ==
- List of Jewish footballers
- List of Jews in sports
- List of Israelis

Sporting positions
Preceded by Tjaronn Chery	Maccabi Haifa F.C. captain 2024–2025	Succeeded by Dolev Haziza
