= Vladan Kujović =

Serbian footballer

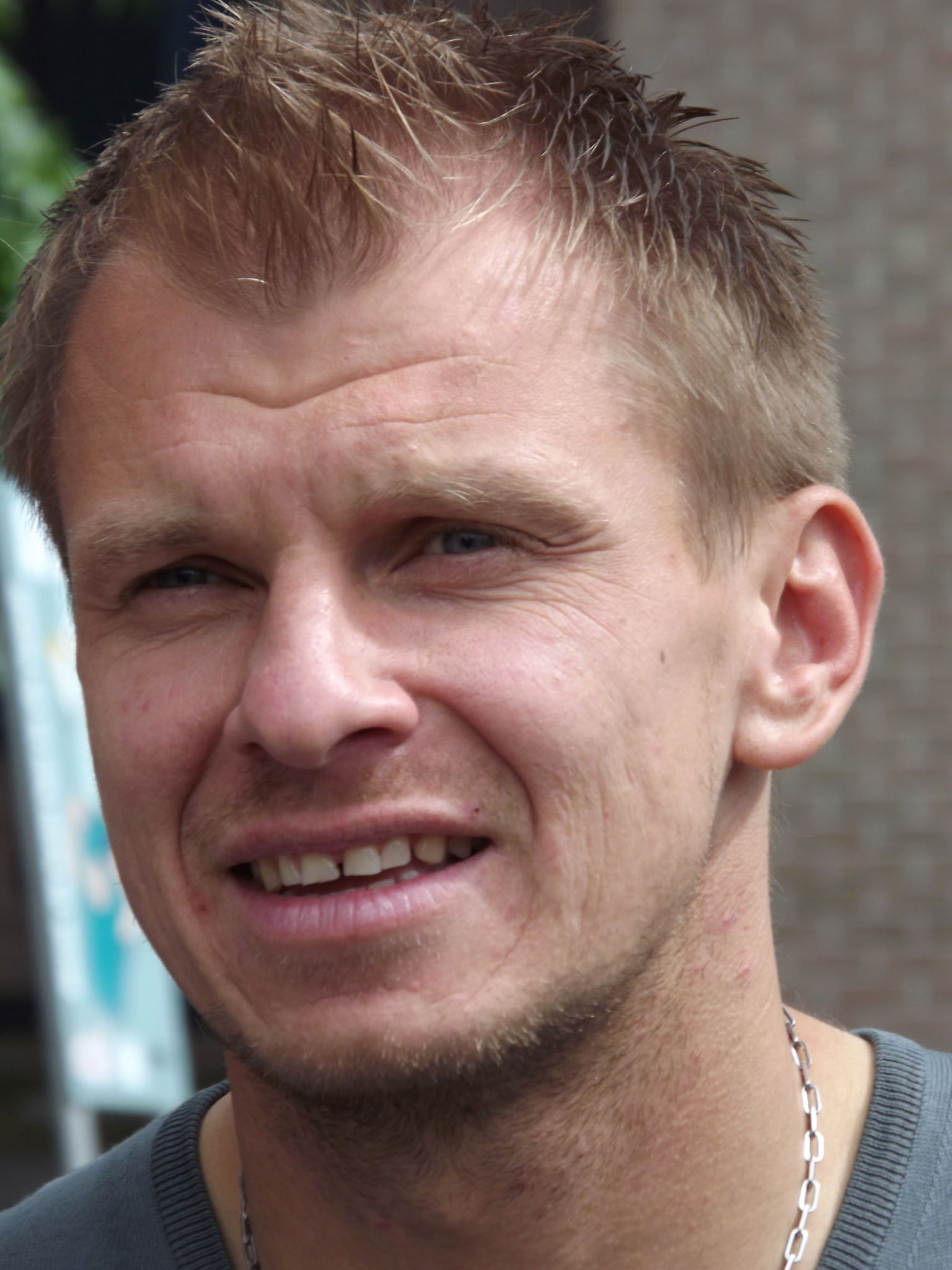
- Kujović in 2012

Personal information
- Full name: Vladan Kujović
- Date of birth: 23 August 1978 (age 48)
- Place of birth: Niš, SFR Yugoslavia
- Height: 1.85 m (6 ft 1 in)
- Position: Goalkeeper

Youth career
- Radnički Niš

Senior career*
Years	Team	Apps	(Gls)
1996–1997	Sinđelić Niš		
1997–2002	Eendracht Aalst	69	(0)
2002–2007	Roda JC	142	(0)
2007–2008	Levante	13	(0)
2008–2011	Lierse SK	75	(1)
2011	Willem II	8	(0)
2011–2015	Club Brugge	33	(0)
2019–2020	MVV	0	(0)
Total		340	(1)

International career
1996–1997	FR Yugoslavia U18	5	(0)
1999–2000	FR Yugoslavia U21	5	(0)

Managerial career
- 2019-2020: MVV (gk coach)
- 2020-2024: Lommel (gk coach)
- 2024-: Westerlo (gk coach)
- * Club domestic league appearances and goals

Vladan Kujović (Serbian Cyrillic: Владан Кујовић; born 23 August 1978) is a Serbian retired footballer who played as a goalkeeper.

== Career ==
Having already made his senior debut for his hometown club Sinđelić Niš, Kujović moved abroad at an early age and signed for Belgian side Eendracht Aalst in 1997. He spent the next five seasons at the club, before transferring to Dutch side Roda JC in 2002. After playing for five years in the Netherlands, Kujović moved to La Liga club Levante in 2007. He spent just one season in Spain, before returning to Belgium and signing for Lierse. In early 2011, Kujović switched to Dutch side Willem II. He subsequently joined Club Brugge and stayed there until his retirement in 2015.

Internationally, Kujović was capped for FR Yugoslavia at under-18 and under-21 level.

== Coaching career ==
On 8 July 2019 MVV Maastricht announced, that Kujović had joined the club as a goalkeeper coach. However, Kujović was also registered as a player and become the third choice, after MVV-keeper, Lars Van Meurs, got seriously injured while playing with his dog. He joined Westerlo in summer 2024 after a four-year stint as goalkeepercoach at Lommel.

== Personal life ==
Kujović was diagnosed with kidney cancer and had one of his kidneys removed in summer 2014.

== Honours ==
Club Brugge

- Belgian Cup: 2014–15
