= Tom De Sutter =

Belgian footballer

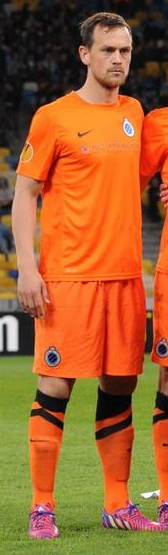
- De Sutter at Club Brugge

Personal information
- Full name: Tom De Sutter
- Date of birth: 3 July 1985 (age 41)
- Place of birth: Ghent, Belgium
- Height: 1.92 m (6 ft 3 1/2 in)
- Position: Forward

Youth career
- 1992–1997: KVV Balegem
- 1997–2001: Standaard Wetteren
- 2001–2005: Club Brugge

Senior career*
Years	Team	Apps	(Gls)
2005–2006	KM Torhout	26	(10)
2006–2009	Cercle Brugge	61	(20)
2009–2013	Anderlecht	118	(36)
2013–2015	Club Brugge	66	(23)
2015–2016	Bursaspor	11	(0)
2016–2018	Lokeren	62	(12)
2019	Oostende	16	(2)
2019–2020	Knokke	20	(15)

International career
2006–2008	Belgium U21	4	(0)
2008–2009	Belgium	14	(0)
- * Club domestic league appearances and goals as of 15:46, 6 November 2019 (UTC)

Tom De Sutter (born 3 July 1985) is a Belgian former footballer who played as a forward.

== Early career ==
De Sutter started his football activities at his local team KVV Balegem, where he was discovered by third division side Standaard Wetteren. From there, he moved to Club Brugge where he couldn't manage to get a place in the first team, so he moved back to a team in the third division, KM Torhout 1992 this time. De Sutter only stayed there for one top-scoring season, as he was discovered by Clubs city rivals, Cercle Brugge, after a friendly match in which De Sutter scored a hat-trick. At Cercle, he managed a breakthrough almost immediately, scoring in his first official match against Excelsior Mouscron.

On 27 November 2007, De Sutter scored 4 goals in 21 minutes in a Belgian Cup game, playing away against KV Mechelen. In the next round, his goal decided the derby against Cercles main rival Club Brugge, one of De Sutter's former youth teams. The stronger and stronger performances by De Sutter didn't go unnoticed during the 2007–08 mid season break. De Sutter raised the interest from RSC Anderlecht and Trabzonspor, and he was voted Best Player of the First Half of the Season by Belgian football fans and media. He also made an unexpected third place in the Golden Shoe election of 2007.

On 1 February, Cercle Brugge announced that after the cup match at home against Standard Liège, in which De Sutter scored the final 4–1 goal, Cercle received some bids for De Sutter. The highest bid was rumoured to be one of € 7.5 million from Zenit Saint Petersburg, although head coach Dick Advocaat denied this. Cercle Brugge spokesman Pol Van Den Driessche confirmed in één program De Zevende Dag that it was not a bid by Zenit, but that it was an Eastern European team and that it was a bid between €5 and 10 million. However, De Sutter decided to stay with Cercle. At the end of January 2008, national coach Rene Vandereycken included De Sutter in his team for Belgium's unofficial friendly match against Standard Liège. One day before the match, he tore one of his knee ligaments, forcing him to six months of absence. He was back for the beginning of season 2008–2009 still playing in Cercle.

=== Bursaspor ===
On 13 August 2015, De Sutter signed a three-year contract with Turkish club Bursaspor.

=== Knokke ===
On 4 July 2019, he joined Knokke on a 2-year contract. However, he decided to retire at the end of the season.

== International career ==
De Sutters performances were also noticed by Jean-François De Sart, the Belgian national under-21 coach, selecting him for the team after his transfer from Cercle. He was part of the squad that qualified for the 2008 Summer Olympics in Beijing.

=== Honours ===
R.S.C. Anderlecht

- Belgian First Division: 2009–10, 2011–12, 2012–13
- Belgian Supercup: 2010, 2012

Club Brugge

- Belgian Cup (1): 2014–15

Sporting positions
Preceded by Darko Pivaljević	Cercle Brugge top scorer alongside Stijn De Smet and Oleg Iachtchouk; 2008	Succeeded by Oleg Iachtchouk
