= Ethan Horvath =

American soccer player (born 1995)

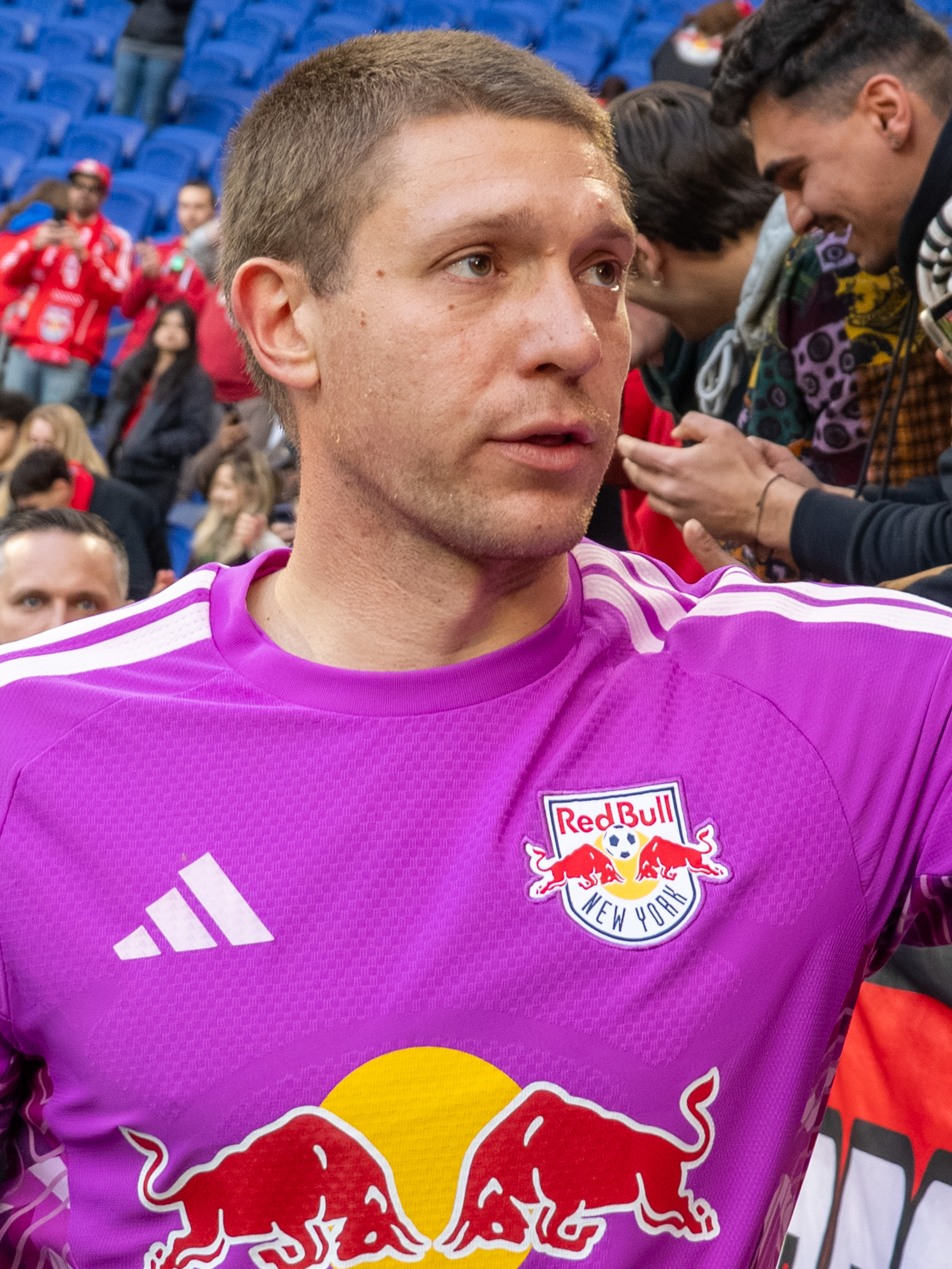
- Horvath with the New York Red Bulls in 2026

Personal information
- Full name: Ethan Shea Horvath
- Date of birth: June 9, 1995 (age 31)
- Place of birth: Highlands Ranch, Colorado, U.S.
- Height: 6 ft 4 in (1.93 m)
- Position: Goalkeeper

Team information
- Current team: New York Red Bulls
- Number: 34

Youth career
- 1999–2012: Real Colorado

Senior career*
| Years | Team | Apps | (Gls) |
| 2013–2017 | Molde | 39 | (0) |
| 2017–2021 | Club Brugge | 51 | (0) |
| 2021–2024 | Nottingham Forest | 6 | (0) |
| 2022–2023 | → Luton Town (loan) | 44 | (0) |
| 2024–2026 | Cardiff City | 33 | (0) |
| 2025–2026 | → Sheffield Wednesday (loan) | 14 | (0) |
| 2026– | New York Red Bulls | 34 | (0) |

International career^{‡}
| 2014–2015 | United States U20 | 2 | (0) |
| 2015–2016 | United States U23 | 6 | (0) |
| 2016–2024 | United States | 10 | (0) |
Medal record
Representing United States
Men's soccer
CONCACAF Under-20 Championship
| Bronze medal – third place | 2015 Jamaica |
CONCACAF Nations League
| Winner | 2021 United States |
| Winner | 2024 United States |
- * Club domestic league appearances and goals as of November 15, 2026 ‡ National team caps and goals as of June 27, 2024

Ethan Shea Horvath (born June 9, 1995) is an American professional soccer player who plays as a goalkeeper for Major League Soccer club New York Red Bulls.

== Early years ==
Horvath was born and raised in Highlands Ranch, Colorado. His father, Peter, played college soccer with the Midwestern State Mustangs and professionally with Major Indoor Soccer League club Denver Avalanche, and his mother, Deana, played high school soccer. Horvath himself grew up playing with U.S. Soccer Development Academy side Real Colorado and for Arapahoe High School. He also trained with Bristol City, Manchester City, and Stoke City in England. He is of Hungarian ancestry on his father's side.

== Club career ==
=== Molde FK ===
Horvath signed his first professional contract in 2013 with Tippeligaen club Molde in Norway, having been recruited by Molde manager and former Manchester United player Ole Gunnar Solskjær. Horvath first appeared in a Molde matchday squad on August 10, 2013. He made his professional debut on May 16, 2015, replacing Ørjan Nyland in the 55th minute of the match. On July 1, 2015, Nyland was sold to Bundesliga club Ingolstadt 04, leaving Horvath as Molde's starting goalkeeper at age 20. By the conclusion of the 2015 Tippeligaen, Horvath had helped Molde concede just 31 goals for the season, the second-best mark in the league only behind champions Rosenborg.

Horvath backstopped Molde to a 5–1 aggregate victory over Pyunik in the second qualifying round of the 2015–16 UEFA Champions League, before a 4–4 aggregate loss on the away goals rule to Dinamo Zagreb in the third qualifying round. Later, in the playoff round of the 2015–16 UEFA Europa League, Horvath and Molde had a 3–3 aggregate win on away goals over Standard Liège. With Molde thus qualifying for Europa League Group A, Horvath joined Brad Friedel, Kasey Keller, Tim Howard, and Brad Guzan as the only American goalkeepers ever to play in the UEFA Europa League/UEFA Cup group stage.

On October 2, 2015, Horvath was named to the Europa League Team of the Week, a day after being named Man of the Match for a 1–1 draw against Ajax in which he notched 10 saves, most notably from a point-blank header from Viktor Fischer. Horvath led Molde to a first-place finish in Europa League Group A with successful two-legged fixtures against Ajax, Celtic, and Fenerbahçe, the latter of which featured two saves on Robin van Persie and three saves on Nani. Combining his play in the Tippeligaen and in the Europa League, he had not allowed multiple goals in a match for over two months. In February 2016, Horvath faced eventual Europa League champions Sevilla in the knockout phase and was unable to prevent a 1–3 aggregate defeat of Molde, although he kept a clean sheet in the second leg.

=== Club Brugge ===
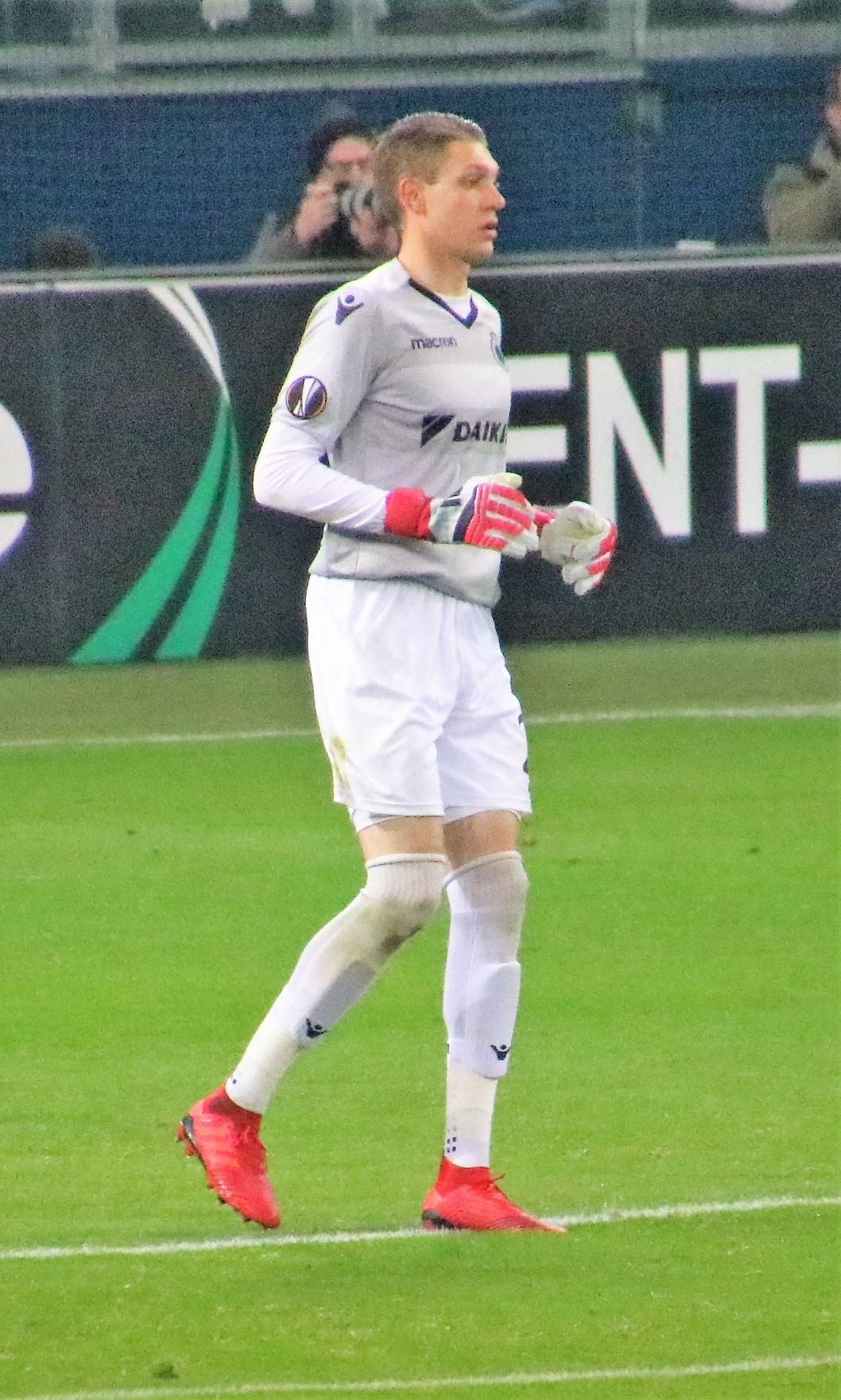
Horvath with Club Brugge in 2019.

On January 3, 2017, Horvath signed with Belgium's Club Brugge on a four-and-a-half-year contract. He debuted as Club Brugge's starting goalkeeper on May 5 in the Championship playoffs. After initially letting in a goal due to confusing a whistle from the stands as the referee's whistle, Horvath rebounded to make three saves, and even notched an assist to José Izquierdo off a punt, in a 3–1 victory over Charleroi. The following match, in a 1–1 draw against Anderlecht, Horvath made four saves, including on a penalty kick attempted by Youri Tielemans. Horvath continued to start in goal to close out the season, helping Club Brugge secure a place in the 2017–18 UEFA Champions League third qualifying round.

At the start of the 2017–18 season, Horvath resumed his position as the starting goalkeeper for Club Brugge, starting in the first twelve league matches including ten victories. He also started the Champions League qualifying matches against İstanbul Başakşehir and Europa League qualifying matches against AEK Athens, both of which were defeats on aggregate. However, he was eventually benched and then kept out of the squad for much of the season, not receiving another run of starts until May 2018 in the Belgian First Division A Championship Play-offs. He started three matches in the league play-offs as Club Brugge finished as champions and thus qualified for the 2018–19 UEFA Champions League group stage.

Horvath began on the bench for Club Brugge in the 2018–19 season behind Croatian international goalkeeper Karlo Letica, but Horvath soon regained the starting job. Horvath posted a trio of consecutive clean sheets against AS Monaco, Borussia Dortmund, and Atlético Madrid in the UEFA Champions League group stage.

With Simon Mignolet joining Club Brugge ahead of the 2019–20 season, Horvath was once again relegated to the second-choice goalkeeper, being only used sparingly by the club.

=== Nottingham Forest ===
On July 13, 2021, Horvath joined EFL Championship side Nottingham Forest on a free transfer following the expiration of his contract at Club Brugge. On May 29, 2022, Horvath came on as a substitute in Forest's 1–0 play-off final victory over Huddersfield Town at Wembley Stadium in the 90th minute, due to an injury for starting goalkeeper Brice Samba.

On July 2, 2022, Horvath was loaned to Championship side Luton Town for the 2022–23 season, helping them to promotion via the play-offs.

=== Cardiff City ===
On February 1, 2024, Horvath signed a three-and-a-half-year deal with Welsh EFL Championship side Cardiff City for an undisclosed fee.

On August 22, 2025, Hovarth signed for EFL Championship club Sheffield Wednesday on a loan until 2 January 2026 following the injury to Pierce Charles and Sheffield Wednesday having no other senior goalkeeper. He made his debut the following day in a 2–2 draw against Wrexham. The next game he would save 2 penalties in a penalty shootout to help Wednesday beat Leeds United in the EFL Cup. He was sent off late against Charlton Athletic for a late challenge and would serve a one-match ban. He returned to Cardiff City in January as expected having played 16 games in all competitions for Sheffield Wednesday.

=== New York Red Bulls ===
On January 29, 2026, Horvath signed a one-and-a-half-year contract through June 2027 with options for 2027–28 and 2028–29 with Major League Soccer club New York Red Bulls on a free transfer.

== International career ==
Horvath has represented United States youth teams at every level since U-14. He was named to the U.S. under-20 squad for the 2015 FIFA U-20 World Cup in New Zealand, although his club did not release him. He was the U.S. under-23 starting goalkeeper for the CONCACAF–CONMEBOL Olympic qualifying playoff against Colombia, conceding two goals in two matches as U.S. lost on aggregate.

Horvath was named to the 23-man U.S. squad for the Copa América Centenario held in June 2016. Head coach Jürgen Klinsmann called Horvath one of his "biggest hopes for the future" at the goalkeeper position. On October 7, 2016, Horvath made his U.S. debut, playing the full match and keeping a clean sheet in a 2–0 victory over Cuba.

On May 24, 2021, Horvath was named to the United States' roster for the 2021 CONCACAF Nations League Finals. In the 2021 CONCACAF Nations League Final on June 6, 2021, Horvath was substituted on in the second half after starting goalkeeper Zack Steffen suffered a non-contact knee injury. Horvath proved to be instrumental to the United States' 3–2 victory, as he made several key saves, including saving Andrés Guardado's penalty late into extra time which would have tied up the score and most likely sent the game to a penalty shoot-out. For his efforts, he was subsequently named the man of the match.

On November 9, 2022, Horvath was named to the United States' roster for the 2022 FIFA World Cup in Qatar. During the tournament, Horvath saw no playing time, serving as backup to Matt Turner.

== Personal life ==
Born to a Hungarian father, Horvath also holds a Hungarian passport.

== Career statistics ==
=== Club ===
As of match played November 6, 2026

Appearances and goals by club, season and competition
| Club | Season | League | | | National cup (Note: Includes Norwegian Cup, Belgian Cup, FA Cup) | | League cup (Note: Includes EFL Cup) | | Continental | | Other | | Total | |
| Club | Season | Division | Apps | Goals | Apps | Goals | Apps | Goals | Apps | Goals | Apps | Goals | Apps | Goals |
|---|---|---|---|---|---|---|---|---|---|---|---|---|---|---|
| Molde | 2013 | Tippeligaen | 0 | 0 | 0 | 0 | — | | 0 | 0 | 0 | 0 | 0 | 0 |
| Molde | 2014 | Tippeligaen | 0 | 0 | 2 | 0 | — | | 0 | 0 | — | | 2 | 0 |
| Molde | 2015 | Tippeligaen | 17 | 0 | 2 | 0 | — | | 13 (Note: Three appearances in the UEFA Champions League and ten appearances in the UEFA Europa League) | 0 | 0 | 0 | 32 | 0 |
| Molde | 2016 | Tippeligaen | 22 | 0 | 0 | 0 | — | | 0 | 0 | — | | 22 | 0 |
| Molde | Total | | 39 | 0 | 4 | 0 | — | | 13 | 0 | — | | 56 | 0 |
| Club Brugge | 2016–17 | Belgian Pro League | 4 | 0 | 0 | 0 | — | | 0 | 0 | — | | 4 | 0 |
| Club Brugge | 2017–18 | Belgian Pro League | 15 | 0 | 0 | 0 | — | | 4 (Note: Appearance(s) in the UEFA Champions League) | 0 | — | | 19 | 0 |
| Club Brugge | 2018–19 | Belgian Pro League | 28 | 0 | 1 | 0 | — | | 5 (Note: Three appearances in the UEFA Champions League and two appearances in the UEFA Europa League) | 0 | 0 | 0 | 34 | 0 |
| Club Brugge | 2019–20 | Belgian Pro League | 2 | 0 | 1 | 0 | — | | 0 | 0 | — | | 3 | 0 |
| Club Brugge | 2020–21 | Belgian Pro League | 2 | 0 | 1 | 0 | — | | 1 | 0 | — | | 4 | 0 |
| Club Brugge | Total | | 51 | 0 | 3 | 0 | — | | 10 | 0 | — | | 64 | 0 |
| Nottingham Forest | 2021–22 | Championship | 6 | 0 | 2 | 0 | 2 | 0 | — | | 1 (Note: Appearance(s) in the EFL Championship play-offs) | 0 | 11 | 0 |
| Nottingham Forest | 2023–24 | Premier League | 0 | 0 | — | | — | | — | | — | | 0 | 0 |
| Nottingham Forest | Total | | 6 | 0 | 2 | 0 | 2 | 0 | — | | 1 | 0 | 11 | 0 |
| Luton Town (loan) | 2022–23 | Championship | 44 | 0 | 4 | 0 | — | | — | | 3 | 0 | 51 | 0 |
| Cardiff City | 2023–24 | Championship | 16 | 0 | — | | — | | — | | — | | 16 | 0 |
| Cardiff City | 2024–25 | Championship | 17 | 0 | 3 | 0 | — | | — | | — | | 20 | 0 |
| Cardiff City | Total | | 33 | 0 | 3 | 0 | 0 | 0 | — | | 0 | 0 | 36 | 0 |
| Sheffield Wednesday (loan) | 2025–26 | Championship | 14 | 0 | — | | 2 | 0 | — | | — | | 16 | 0 |
| New York Red Bulls | 2026 | Major League Soccer | 34 | 0 | 0 | 0 | — | | — | | — | | 34 | 0 |
| Career total | | | 212 | 0 | 16 | 0 | 4 | 0 | 23 | 0 | 4 | 0 | 259 | 0 |

=== International ===
As of match played June 27, 2024

Appearances and goals by national team and year
| National team | Year | Apps | Goals |
|---|---|---|---|
| United States | 2016 | 1 | 0 |
| United States | 2017 | 1 | 0 |
| United States | 2018 | 1 | 0 |
| United States | 2019 | 1 | 0 |
| United States | 2020 | 0 | 0 |
| United States | 2021 | 3 | 0 |
| United States | 2022 | 1 | 0 |
| United States | 2023 | 1 | 0 |
| United States | 2024 | 1 | 0 |
| Total | | 10 | 0 |

== Honors ==
Molde

- Norwegian Premier League: 2014
- Norwegian Football Cup: 2014

Club Brugge

- Belgian Pro League: 2017–18, 2019–20, 2020–21
- Belgian Super Cup: 2018

Nottingham Forest

- EFL Championship play-offs: 2022

Luton Town

- EFL Championship play-offs: 2023

United States U20

- CONCACAF Under-20 Championship bronze: 2015

United States

- CONCACAF Nations League: 2019–20, 2023–24
