= 2018–19 Club Brugge KV season =

Club Brugge
2018–19 season
- Chairman: Bart Verhaeghe
- Stadium: Jan Breydel Stadium
- Belgian Pro League: 2nd
- Belgian Cup: Sixth round
- Belgian Super Cup: Winners
- UEFA Champions League: Group stage
- UEFA Europa League: Round of 32
- Top goalscorer: League: Hans Vanaken (14); All: Hans Vanaken; Wesley (17 each)
Home colours	Away colours	Third colours

The 2018–19 season was Club Brugge's 127th season in existence and the club's 59th consecutive season in the top flight of Belgian football.

== Players ==
=== First-team squad ===
As of 6 February 2019

Note: Flags indicate national team as defined under FIFA eligibility rules; some limited exceptions apply. Players may hold more than one non-FIFA nationality.

No.	Pos.	Nation	Player
1	GK	CRO	Karlo Letica
4	DF	BRA	Luan Peres
5	DF	FRA	Benoît Poulain
6	MF	MAR	Sofyan Amrabat
7	FW	BRA	Wesley
9	FW	BEL	Jelle Vossen
10	FW	IRI	Kaveh Rezaei
11	FW	SEN	Krépin Diatta
15	DF	CRO	Matej Mitrović
16	FW	BEL	Siebe Schrijvers
18	MF	ZIM	Marvelous Nakamba
19	DF	BEL	Thibault Vlietinck
20	MF	BEL	Hans Vanaken (Vice-captain)
21	DF	BEL	Dion Cools

No.	Pos.	Nation	Player
22	GK	USA	Ethan Horvath
24	DF	NED	Stefano Denswil (3rd captain)
25	MF	NED	Ruud Vormer (Captain)
26	MF	BEL	Mats Rits
28	GK	BEL	Guillaume Hubert
34	GK	BEL	Brent Gabriel
35	DF	SUI	Saulo Decarli
42	FW	NGR	Emmanuel Dennis
44	DF	BEL	Brandon Mechele
47	FW	NED	Arnaut Danjuma
77	DF	ANG	Clinton Mata
80	FW	BEL	Loïs Openda
98	MF	BEL	Brandon Baiye

==== Out on loan ====
No.	Pos.	Nation	Player
8	MF	ISR	Lior Refaelov (on loan to (Belgium) Antwerp until 30 June 2019)
29	FW	ROU	Dorin Rotariu (on loan to (Netherlands) AZ until 30 June 2019)
33	MF	AUS	Riley McGree (on loan to (Australia) Melbourne City until 30 June 2019)
40	MF	BEL	Jordi Vanlerberghe (on loan to (Belgium) Oostende until 30 June 2019)

No.	Pos.	Nation	Player
55	DF	SRB	Erhan Mašović (on loan to (Slovakia) Trenčín until 30 June 2019)
96	DF	BEL	Ahmed Touba (on loan to (Belgium) Leuven until 30 June 2019)

== Competitions ==
=== Belgian First Division A ===
==== League table ====
Regular season

Pos	Team	Pld	W	D	L	GF	GA	GD	Pts	Qualification or relegation
1	Genk	30	18	9	3	63	31	+32	63	Qualification for the championship play-offs
2	Club Brugge	30	16	8	6	64	32	+32	56	Qualification for the championship play-offs
3	Standard Liège	30	15	8	7	49	35	+14	53	Qualification for the championship play-offs
4	Anderlecht	30	15	6	9	49	34	+15	51	Qualification for the championship play-offs
5	Gent	30	15	5	10	53	45	+8	50	Qualification for the championship play-offs

Source: Belgian First Division A (in Dutch), Soccerway
Rules for classification: 1) Points; 2) Matches won; 3) Goal difference; 4) Goals scored; 5) Away goals scored; 6) Away matches won; 7) Play-off.

Championship play-offs

Pos	Team	Pld	W	D	L	GF	GA	GD	Pts	Qualification	GNK	CLU	STA	ANT	GNT	AND
1	Genk (C)	10	6	2	2	19	8	+11	52	Qualification for the Champions League group stage	—	3–1	0–0	4–0	2–1	3–0
2	Club Brugge	10	7	1	2	19	11	+8	50	Qualification for the Champions League third qualifying round	3–2	—	4–0	3–2	3–0	1–0
3	Standard Liège	10	4	1	5	17	16	+1	40	Qualification for the Europa League group stage	1–3	2–0	—	3–1	2–3	5–0 FF (Note: Match was abandoned near the end of the first half as Anderlecht supporters had been throwing flares and smoke bombs on the pitch. At that time Standard was leading 2–0. A few weeks later Anderlecht was fined 5.000 Euro and forced to play one match behind closed doors, with the match result set to a 5–0 win for Standard.)
4	Antwerp (O)	10	4	2	4	12	16	−4	39	Qualification for the Europa League play-off Final	1–0	0–0	2–1	—	1–2	1–1
5	Gent	10	3	1	6	10	15	−5	35	Qualification for the Europa League second qualifying round	0–1	0–1	1–2	1–2	—	2–1
6	Anderlecht	10	1	3	6	8	19	−11	32		1–1	2–3	2–1	1–2	0–0	—

Source: Sport.be
Rules for classification: 1) Points; 2) Points without (possible) half points added due to rounding; 3) Position obtained during the Regular season
(C) Champions; (O) Play-off winners

=== Belgian Cup ===
26 September 2018 Sixth round	Deinze	2–0	Club Brugge	Deinze
20:30 CEST	Tarfi 33'; De Greef 70'	Report		Stadium: Burgemeester Van de Wiele Stadion

=== Belgian Super Cup ===
22 July 2018	Club Brugge	2–1	Standard Liège	Jan Breydelstadion, Bruges
20:00 CEST	Vanaken 39'; Wesley 43'		Edmilson 49'	Attendance: 16,000; Referee: Bart Vertenten

=== UEFA Champions League ===
Pos	Team	Pld	W	D	L	GF	GA	GD	Pts	Qualification
1	(Germany) Borussia Dortmund	6	4	1	1	10	2	+8	13 (Note: Head-to-head goal difference: Borussia Dortmund +2, Atlético Madrid –2.)	Advance to knockout phase
2	(Spain) Atlético Madrid	6	4	1	1	9	6	+3	13	Advance to knockout phase
3	(Belgium) Club Brugge	6	1	3	2	6	5	+1	6	Transfer to Europa League
4	(France) Monaco	6	0	1	5	2	14	−12	1	

Source: UEFA
Rules for classification: Group stage tiebreakers
Notes:

18 September 2018 1	Club Brugge (Belgium)	0–1	(Germany) Borussia Dortmund	Jan Breydel Stadium, Bruges
21:00		Report	Pulisic 85'	Attendance: 25,181; Referee: Danny Makkelie (Netherlands)

3 October 2018 2	Atlético Madrid (Spain)	3–1	(Belgium) Club Brugge	Metropolitano Stadium, Madrid
21:00	Griezmann 28', 67'; Koke 90+4'	Report	Danjuma 39'	Attendance: 55,742; Referee: Ivan Kružliak (Slovakia)

24 October 2018 3	Club Brugge (Belgium)	1–1	(France) Monaco	Jan Breydel Stadium, Bruges
18:55	Wesley 39'	Report	Sylla 31'	Attendance: 23,957; Referee: Michael Oliver (England)

6 November 2018 4	Monaco (France)	0–4	(Belgium) Club Brugge	Stade Louis II, Monaco
18:55		Report	Vanaken 12', 17' (pen.); Wesley 24'; Vormer 85'	Attendance: 8,347; Referee: Artur Soares Dias (Portugal)

28 November 2018 5	Borussia Dortmund (Germany)	0–0	(Belgium) Club Brugge	Westfalenstadion, Dortmund
21:00		Report		Attendance: 66,099; Referee: Gediminas Mažeika (Lithuania)

11 December 2018 6	Club Brugge (Belgium)	0–0	(Spain) Atlético Madrid	Jan Breydel Stadium, Bruges
21:00		Report		Attendance: 25,645; Referee: Davide Massa (Italy)

=== UEFA Europa League ===
14 February 2019 Round of 32 1st leg	Club Brugge (Belgium)	2–1	(Austria) Red Bull Salzburg	Jan Breydel Stadium, Bruges
21:00	Denswil 64'; Wesley 81'	Report	Junuzović 17'	Attendance: 16,457; Referee: Georgi Kabakov (Bulgaria)

21 February 2019 Round of 32 2nd leg	Red Bull Salzburg (Austria)	4–0 (5–2 agg.)	(Belgium) Club Brugge	Stadion Wals-Siezenheim, Salzburg
18:55	Schlager 17'; Daka 29', 43'; Dabbur 90+4'	Report		Attendance: 24,717; Referee: Daniel Siebert (Germany)

== Statistics ==
=== Squad appearances and goals ===
Last updated in May 2019.

No.	Pos	Nat	Player	Total		Belgian Division		Belgian Cup		Belgian Super Cup		UEFA Champions League		UEFA Europa League	
No.	Pos	Nat	Player	Apps	Goals	Apps	Goals	Apps	Goals	Apps	Goals	Apps	Goals	Apps	Goals
Goalkeepers
1	GK	(Croatia) CRO	Karlo Letica	16	0	12	0	0	0	1	0	3	0	0	0
22	GK	(United States) USA	Ethan Horvath	34	0	27+1	0	1	0	0	0	3	0	2	0
28	GK	(Belgium) BEL	Guillaume Hubert	0	0	0	0	0	0	0	0	0	0	0	0
34	GK	(Belgium) BEL	Brent Gabriel	0	0	0	0	0	0	0	0	0	0	0	0
Defenders
4	DF	(Brazil) BRA	Luan Peres	6	0	0+4	0	1	0	0	0	0+1	0	0	0
5	DF	(France) FRA	Benoît Poulain	32	1	23+1	1	0	0	0	0	6	0	1+1	0
15	DF	(Croatia) CRO	Matej Mitrović	13	0	11+1	0	0	0	1	0	0	0	0	0
19	DF	(Belgium) BEL	Thibault Vlietinck	15	1	6+5	1	0	0	0	0	3+1	0	0	0
21	DF	(Belgium) BEL	Dion Cools	20	1	1+14	1	1	0	0+1	0	0+2	0	1	0
24	DF	(Netherlands) NED	Stefano Denswil	44	2	35	1	0	0	1	0	6	0	2	1
35	DF	(Switzerland) SUI	Saulo Decarli	12	0	5+4	0	1	0	1	0	0+1	0	0	0
44	DF	(Belgium) BEL	Brandon Mechele	40	0	32	0	1	0	0	0	5	0	2	0
77	DF	(Angola) ANG	Clinton Mata	28	2	22+2	2	0	0	0	0	2+2	0	0	0
Midfielders
6	MF	(Morocco) MAR	Sofyan Amrabat	29	1	10+14	1	1	0	0	0	2	0	2	0
18	MF	(Zimbabwe) ZIM	Marvelous Nakamba	23	0	13+5	0	0	0	0	0	4+1	0	0	0
20	MF	(Belgium) BEL	Hans Vanaken	50	17	40	14	0+1	0	1	1	6	2	2	0
25	MF	(Netherlands) NED	Ruud Vormer	47	7	36+2	6	0	0	1	0	6	1	2	0
26	MF	(Belgium) BEL	Mats Rits	48	3	35+4	3	1	0	1	0	3+2	0	2	0
98	MF	(Belgium) BEL	Brandon Baiye	2	0	0+1	0	0	0	0+1	0	0	0	0	0
Forwards
7	FW	(Brazil) BRA	Wesley	48	17	37+1	13	0+1	0	1	1	6	2	2	1
9	FW	(Belgium) BEL	Jelle Vossen	18	5	4+10	5	1	0	1	0	1	0	0+1	0
10	FW	(Iran) IRI	Kaveh Rezaei	13	1	4+7	1	0	0	0	0	1+1	0	0	0
11	FW	(Senegal) SEN	Krépin Diatta	28	2	21+2	2	0	0	1	0	1+1	0	0+2	0
16	FW	(Belgium) BEL	Siebe Schrijvers	38	12	25+7	12	1	0	0+1	0	1+1	0	2	0
27	FW	(Belgium) BEL	Cyril Ngonge	5	0	1+3	0	0	0	0	0	1	0	0	0
42	FW	(Nigeria) NGR	Emmanuel Dennis	32	7	20+6	7	1	0	0	0	2+1	0	2	0
47	FW	(Netherlands) NED	Arnaut Danjuma	24	6	13+7	5	0+1	0	1	0	2	1	0	0
80	FW	(Belgium) BEL	Loïs Openda	28	4	3+17	4	1	0	0	0	1+4	0	0+2	0
Players who have made an appearance this season but have left the club
2	DF	(Denmark) DEN	Alexander Scholz	1	0	1	0	0	0	0	0	0	0	0	0
14	DF	(Croatia) CRO	Ivan Tomečak	3	0	2+1	0	0	0	0	0	0	0	0	0
