= 2019–20 Club Brugge KV season =

Club Brugge
2019–20 season
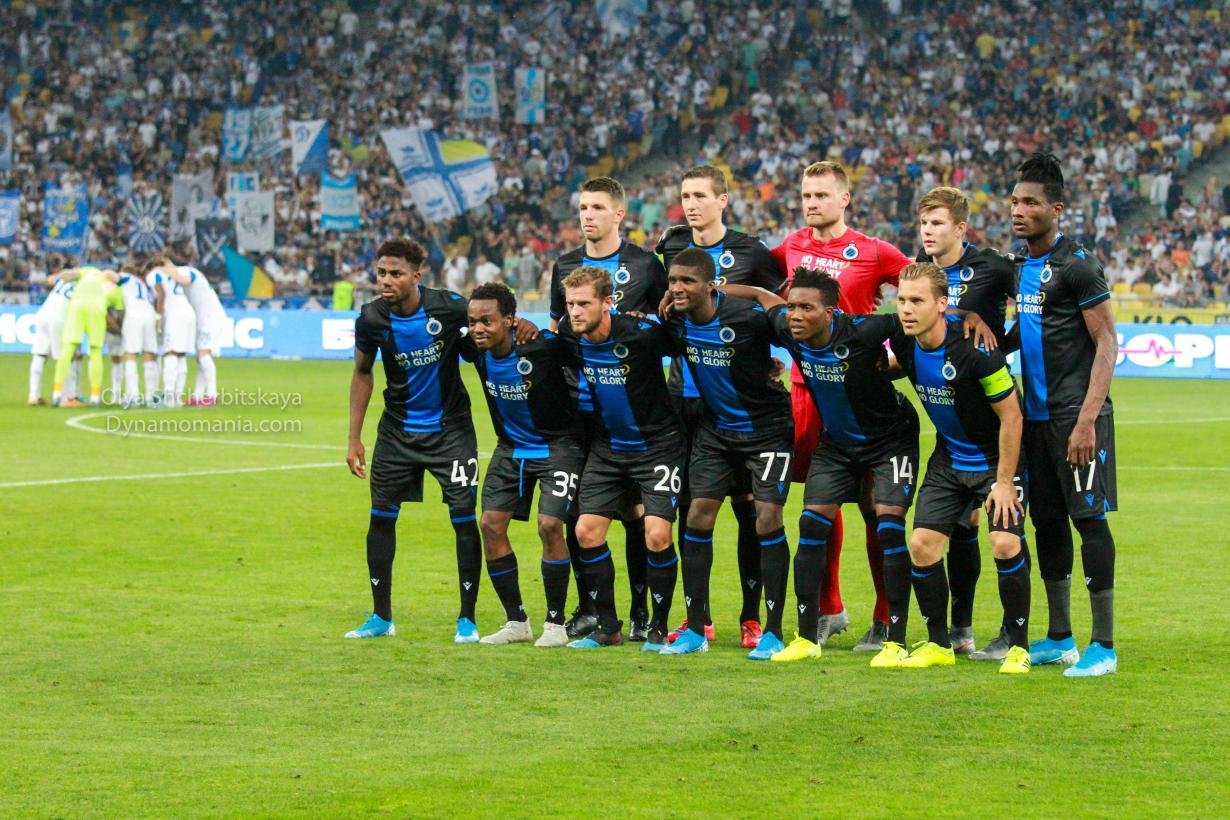
- Chairman: Bart Verhaeghe
- Head Coach: Philippe Clement
- Stadium: Jan Breydel Stadium
- Belgian Pro League: 1st
- Belgian Cup: Runners-up
- UEFA Champions League: Group stage
- UEFA Europa League: Round of 32
- Top goalscorer: League: Hans Vanaken (13); All: Hans Vanaken (17)
colours	Away colours	Third colours

The 2019–20 season was Club Brugge's 128th season in existence and the club's 60th consecutive season in the top flight of Belgian football. In addition to the domestic league, Club Brugge participated in this season's editions of the Belgian Cup, the UEFA Champions League, and the UEFA Europa League. The season covered the period from 1 July 2019 to 1 August 2020.

== Players ==
=== Current squad ===
As of 3 September 2019

Note: Flags indicate national team as defined under FIFA eligibility rules; some limited exceptions apply. Players may hold more than one non-FIFA nationality.

No.	Pos.	Nation	Player
2	DF	UKR	Eduard Sobol (on loan from Shakhtar)
3	MF	COL	Éder Balanta
5	DF	CIV	Odilon Kossounou
7	FW	SEN	Amadou Sagna
9	FW	BEL	Jelle Vossen
10	FW	SEN	Mbaye Diagne (on loan from Galatasaray)
11	FW	SEN	Krépin Diatta
14	FW	NGR	David Okereke
15	DF	CRO	Matej Mitrović
16	MF	BEL	Siebe Schrijvers
17	DF	CIV	Simon Deli
18	DF	URU	Federico Ricca
19	DF	BEL	Thibault Vlietinck

No.	Pos.	Nation	Player
20	MF	BEL	Hans Vanaken (Vice-captain)
21	DF	MAS	Dion Cools
22	GK	USA	Ethan Horvath
25	MF	NED	Ruud Vormer (Captain)
26	MF	BEL	Mats Rits
33	GK	BEL	Nick Shinton
35	FW	RSA	Percy Tau (on loan from Brighton)
42	FW	NGR	Emmanuel Dennis
44	DF	BEL	Brandon Mechele
77	DF	ANG	Clinton Mata
80	FW	BEL	Loïs Openda
88	GK	BEL	Simon Mignolet

=== Out on loan ===
No.	Pos.	Nation	Player
1	GK	CRO	Karlo Letica (on loan to (Italy) S.P.A.L. until 30 June 2020)
4	DF	BRA	Luan Peres (on loan to (Brazil) Santos until 31 December 2020)
6	MF	MAR	Sofyan Amrabat (on loan to (Italy) Hellas Verona until 30 June 2020)
27	FW	BEL	Cyril Ngonge (on loan to (Netherlands) Jong PSV until 30 June 2020)
28	GK	BEL	Guillaume Hubert (on loan to (Belgium) Cercle Brugge until 30 June 2020)

No.	Pos.	Nation	Player
40	MF	BEL	Jordi Vanlerberghe (on loan to (Belgium) KV Mechelen until 30 June 2020)
55	DF	SRB	Erhan Mašović (on loan to (Denmark) Horsens until 30 June 2020)
99	DF	BEL	Noah Fadiga (on loan to (Netherlands) Volendam until 30 June 2020)
—	FW	IRI	Kaveh Rezaei (on loan to (Belgium) Charleroi until 30 June 2020)
—	DF	BEL	Ahmed Touba (on loan to (Bulgaria) Beroe until 30 June 2020)

== Pre-season and friendlies ==
Win Draw Loss

3 July 2019 Friendly	Heracles (Netherlands)	0–1	(Belgium) Club Brugge	Garderen, Netherlands
18:30 CEST (UTC+2)				Stadium: Sportpark De Westeneng

6 July 2019 Friendly	AZ (Netherlands)	5–2	(Belgium) Club Brugge	Garderen, Netherlands
16:30 CEST (UTC+2)				Stadium: Sportpark De Westeneng

12 July 2019 Friendly	Club Brugge (Belgium)	1–1	(Croatia) Lokomotiva	Deinze, Belgium
18:30 CEST (UTC+2)				Stadium: Burgemeester Van de Wielestadion

15 July 2019 Friendly	Club Brugge (Belgium)	3–2	(Belgium) Union Saint-Gilloise	Knokke-Heist, Belgium
19:00 CEST (UTC+2)				Stadium: Stadion de Taeye

19 July 2019 Friendly	Club Brugge (Belgium)	2–2 (4–3 p)	(Portugal) Sporting CP	Bruges, Belgium
20:30 CEST (UTC+2)	Okereke 16'; Vanaken 62' (pen.)		Fernandes 45+2' (pen.); Cabral 53'	Stadium: Jan Breydel Stadium
	Penalties
	Vossen (penalty scored); Schrijvers (penalty scored); Danjuma (penalty missed); Mitrović (penalty scored); Deli (penalty missed); Okereke (penalty scored)		(penalty scored) Phellype; (penalty scored) Plata; (penalty missed) Luís; (penalty scored) Cabral; (penalty missed) Henrique; (penalty missed) Bragança

9 January 2020 Friendly	PSV (Netherlands)	1–2	(Belgium) Club Brugge	Doha, Qatar
17:30 AST (UTC+3)	Teze (yellow card) 47'; Doan 79'		Vossen 53'; Sobol 73'	Stadium: ASPIRE Academy Pitch 1

11 January 2020 Friendly	Ajax (Netherlands)	3–1	(Belgium) Club Brugge	Al Wakrah, Qatar
19:00 AST (UTC+3)	Kossounou 13' (o.g.); Ziyech 15'; Promes 52'		Van den Keybus 83'	Stadium: Al Janoub Stadium

4 July 2020 Friendly	Club Brugge (Belgium)	4–1	(Belgium) OH Leuven	Knokke-Heist, Belgium
18:00 CEST (UTC+2)				Stadium: Complex Molenhoek

8 July 2020 Friendly	Club Brugge (Belgium)	1–1	(Belgium) Beerschot	Knokke-Heist, Belgium
17:00 CEST (UTC+2)				Stadium: Complex Molenhoek

11 July 2020 Friendly	Club Brugge (Belgium)	6–0	(Belgium) Mechelen	Knokke-Heist, Belgium
18:00 CEST (UTC+2)				Stadium: Complex Molenhoek

18 July 2020 Friendly	Club Brugge (Belgium)	2–3	(Belgium) Gent	Knokke-Heist, Belgium
18:00 CEST (UTC+2)				Stadium: Complex Molenhoek

22 July 2020 Friendly	Club Brugge (Belgium)	1–0	(Belgium) Deinze	Knokke-Heist, Belgium
18:00 CEST (UTC+2)	Schrijvers 44'			Stadium: Complex Molenhoek

25 July 2020 Friendly	Club Brugge (Belgium)	2–0	(France) Lille	Bruges, Belgium
18:00 CEST (UTC+2)	Rits 11'; Schrijvers 79'			Stadium: Jan Breydel Stadium

26 July 2020 Friendly	Club Brugge (Belgium)	5–0	(Belgium) Knokke	Knokke-Heist, Belgium
15:00 CEST (UTC+2)	Schrijvers 8', 56'; Aelterman 37'; Krmenčík 65'; Sandra 71'			Stadium: Complex Molenhoek

== Competitions ==
Win Draw Loss Fixtures

=== Overview ===
Competition	First match	Last match	Starting round	Final position	Record							
Competition	First match	Last match	Starting round	Final position	Pld	W	D	L	GF	GA	GD	Win %
Belgian Division	27 July 2019	7 March 2020	Matchday 1	Winners	29	21	7	1	58	14	+44	72.41
Belgian Cup	25 September 2019	1 August 2020	Sixth round	Runners-up	6	3	2	1	9	4	+5	50.00
Champions League	6 August 2019	11 December 2019	Third qualifying round	Group stage	10	3	4	3	11	15	−4	30.00
Europa League	20 February 2020	27 February 2020	Round of 32	Round of 32	2	0	1	1	1	6	−5	0.00
Total					47	27	14	6	79	39	+40	57.45

Last updated: 1 August 2020
Source: Soccerway

=== Belgian Division ===
==== League table ====
Pos	Team	Pld	W	D	L	GF	GA	GD	Pts	Qualification or relegation
1	Club Brugge (C)	29	21	7	1	58	14	+44	70	Qualification for the Champions League group stage
2	Gent	29	16	7	6	59	34	+25	55	Qualification for the Champions League third qualifying round
3	Charleroi	29	15	9	5	49	23	+26	54	Qualification for the Europa League third qualifying round
4	Antwerp (Y)	29	15	8	6	49	32	+17	53	Qualification for the Europa League group stage (Note: Antwerp qualified for the Europa League group stage as the 2019–20 Belgian Cup winners.)
5	Standard Liège	29	14	7	8	47	32	+15	49	Qualification for the Europa League second qualifying round

Source: Belgian First Division A (in Dutch), Soccerway
Rules for classification: 1) Points; 2) Matches won; 3) Goal difference; 4) Goals scored; 5) Away goals scored; 6) Away matches won; 7) Play-off.
(C) Champions; (Y) Croky Cup winner

==== Results summary ====
Overall								Home						Away					
Pld	W	D	L	GF	GA	GD	Pts	W	D	L	GF	GA	GD	W	D	L	GF	GA	GD
29	21	7	1	58	14	+44	70	12	3	0	33	5	+28	9	4	1	25	9	+16

Last updated: 7 March 2020.
Source: Jupiler Pro League

==== Results by round ====
Matchday	1	2	3	4	5	6	7	8	9	10	11	12	13	14	15	16	17	18	19	20	21	22	23	24	25	26	27	28	29	30
Ground	A	H	A	H	H	A	H	A	H	A	H	A	H	A	H	H	A	H	A	H	A	A	A	H	A	H	H	A	H	A
Result	W	W	W	D	D	W	W	W	W	W	D	W	W	L	W	W	W	W	D	W	W	D	D	W	D	W	W	W	W	C
Position	2	1	1	1	2	2	2	1	1	1	1	1	1	1	1	1	1	1	1	1	1	1	1	1	1	1	1	1	1	1

Updated to match(es) played on 7 March 2020. Source: Jupiler Pro League
A = Away; H = Home; W = Win; D = Draw; L = Loss

==== Matches ====
On 2 April 2020, the Jupiler Pro League's board of directors proposed to cancel the season due to the COVID-19 pandemic. The General Assembly accepted the proposal on 15 May, and officially ended the 2019–20 season.

27 July 2019 1	Waasland-Beveren	1–3	Club Brugge	Beveren
18:00 CEST (UTC+2)	Bizimana (yellow card) 7'; Foulon (yellow card) 25'; Forte 32' (pen.); Caufriez (yellow card) 45+1'	Report	Vanaken (yellow card) 42', (goal) 45+2' (pen.), 70'; Okereke 48'	Stadium: Freethiel Stadion; Attendance: 5,229; Referee: Lothar D'hondt

2 August 2019 2	Club Brugge	6–0	Sint-Truiden	Bruges
20:30 CEST (UTC+2)	Okereke 16', 20'; Vanaken 39'; Tau 44'; Rits (yellow card) 67'; Dennis 72'; Schrijvers 83'; Openda (red card) 89'	Report	García (yellow card) 23'; De Smet (yellow card) 64'; Boli (yellow card) 73'; Teixeira (yellow card) 75'	Stadium: Jan Breydel Stadium; Attendance: 24,600; Referee: Nicolas Laforge

10 August 2019 3	Oostende	0–2	Club Brugge	Ostend
18:00 CEST (UTC+2)		Report	Okereke 72'; Tau 82'	Stadium: Versluys Arena; Attendance: 6,753; Referee: Erik Lambrechts

16 August 2019 4	Club Brugge	0–0	Eupen	Bruges
20:30 CEST (UTC+2)	Mata (yellow card) 82'; Vanaken (yellow card) 90+4'; Vormer (yellow card) 90+4'	Report	Koch (yellow card) 29'; Gnaka (yellow card) 57'; Toyokawa (yellow card) 59'; Rocha (yellow card) 89'	Stadium: Jan Breydel Stadium; Attendance: 27,000; Referee: Bram Van Driessche

1 September 2019 5	Club Brugge	1–1	Genk	Bruges
14:30 CEST (UTC+2)	Deli 41'; Okereke (yellow card) 45+1'; Dennis (yellow card) 90+1'	Report	Piotrowski (yellow card) 21'; Berge (yellow card) 56'; Dewaest 67'; Ndongala (yellow card) 79'; Samatta (yellow card) 85'	Stadium: Jan Breydel Stadium; Attendance: 27,774; Referee: Erik Lambrechts

14 September 2019 6	Cercle Brugge	0–2	Club Brugge	Bruges
20:30 CEST (UTC+2)	Biancone (yellow card) 13'	Report	Diatta 32'; Álvarez (yellow card) 53'; Dennis 61', (yellow card) 62'	Stadium: Jan Breydel Stadium; Attendance: 12,120; Referee: Nicolas Laforge

22 September 2019 7	Club Brugge	2–1	Anderlecht	Bruges
18:00 CEST (UTC+2)	Diatta 6', 69'; Mata (yellow card) 78'	Report	Chadli 5'; Trebel (yellow card) 63'; Sandler (yellow card) 86'	Stadium: Jan Breydel Stadium; Attendance: 26,500; Referee: Alexandre Boucaut

28 September 2019 8	Mechelen	0–5	Club Brugge	Mechelen
18:00 CEST (UTC+2)	Van Damme (yellow card) 20'; Schoofs (red card) 30'; Corryn (yellow card) 79'	Report	Diatta 19'; Diagne 63', 70'; Schrijvers 77'; Vanaken 82'; Openda (yellow card) 88'	Stadium: Achter de Kazerne; Attendance: 16,500; Referee: Nicolas Laforge

6 October 2019 9	Club Brugge	4–0	Gent	Bruges
14:30 CEST (UTC+2)	Vanaken 11'; Diatta 28'; Dennis 51'; Mata (yellow card) 62'; Okereke (yellow card) 80'; Schrijvers (yellow card) 88'; Diagne 90+2', (yellow card) 90+2'	Report	Yaremchuk (yellow card) 33'; Jonathan David (yellow card) 35'; Asare (yellow card) 89'	Stadium: Jan Breydel Stadium; Attendance: 27,000; Referee: Jonathan Lardot

18 October 2019 10	Mouscron	0–1	Club Brugge	Mouscron
20:30 CEST (UTC+2)		Report	Rits (yellow card) 33'; Vanaken 40'	Stadium: Stade Le Canonnier; Attendance: 8,051; Referee: Lothar D'hondt

27 October 2019 11	Club Brugge	1–1	Standard Liège	Bruges
14:30 CET (UTC+1)	Okereke 47'; Álvarez (yellow card) 65'	Report	Bastien 5'; Gavory (yellow card) 39'; Bodart (yellow card) 90+3'	Stadium: Jan Breydel Stadium; Attendance: 28,000; Referee: Lawrence Visser

30 October 2019 12	Zulte Waregem	0–2	Club Brugge	Waregem
20:30 CET (UTC+1)	Seck (yellow card) 25'	Report	Okereke 23'; Kossounou (yellow card) 34'; Mechele (yellow card) 90+2'; Diagne 90+3'	Stadium: Regenboogstadion; Attendance: 11,000; Referee: Erik Lambrechts

2 November 2019 13	Club Brugge	3–0	Kortrijk	Bruges
20:30 CET (UTC+1)	Vanaken 3', 21'; Okereke 69'	Report	D'haene (yellow card) 14'; Rougeaux (yellow card) 39'; Kagelmacher (yellow card) 65'; De Sart (yellow card) 71'	Stadium: Jan Breydel Stadium; Attendance: 21,139; Referee: Nathan Verboomen

10 November 2019 14	Antwerp	2–1	Club Brugge	Antwerp
14:30 CET (UTC+1)	Haroun (yellow card) 33'; Bolat (yellow card) 42'; Miyoshi (yellow card) 45+1'; Mbokani 49' (pen.); Mignolet 64' (o.g.); Lamkel Zé (yellow card) 65'; De Sart (yellow card) 78'; Hoedt (yellow card) 79'	Report	Schrijvers 25'; Álvarez (yellow card) 61'; Vanaken (yellow card) 75'; Vormer (yellow card) 77'	Stadium: Bosuilstadion; Attendance: 16,649; Referee: Bram Van Driessche

22 November 2019 15	Club Brugge	2–0	Oostende	Bruges
20:30 CET (UTC+1)	Rits 29'; Schrijvers 47'; Dennis (yellow card) 90'	Report	Vargas (red card) 36'	Stadium: Jan Breydel Stadium; Attendance: 21,307; Referee: Jan Boterberg

30 November 2019 16	Club Brugge	1–0	Mouscron	Bruges
18:00 CET (UTC+1)	Vanaken 18'	Report	Osabutey (yellow card) 24'; Campins (yellow card) 87'	Stadium: Jan Breydel Stadium; Attendance: 29,472; Referee: Wesley Alen

7 December 2019 17	Sint-Truiden	1–2	Club Brugge	Sint-Truiden
20:30 CET (UTC+1)	Boli 20', (yellow card) 54'; Colombatto (yellow card) 53'	Report	Mechele (yellow card) 23'; Álvarez 44', (yellow card) 74'; Ricca (yellow card) 70', (goal) 85'; Mata (yellow card) 78'; Janssens (yellow card) 88'	Stadium: Stayen; Attendance: 9,893; Referee: Lothar D'hondt

15 December 2019 18	Club Brugge	3–0	Mechelen	Bruges
18:00 CET (UTC+1)	Dennis (yellow card) 25', (goal) 30'; Tau 28'; Rits 80'	Report	Togui (yellow card) 20'; Kaya (yellow card) 45+1'; Peyre (yellow card) 77'	Stadium: Jan Breydel Stadium; Attendance: 27,000; Referee: Nathan Verboomen

22 December 2019 19	Gent	1–1	Club Brugge	Ghent
14:30 CET (UTC+1)	Depoitre (yellow card) 59'; Jonathan David (yellow card) 71'; Odjidja-Ofoe 73', (yellow card) 86'; Bezus (yellow card) 90+3'	Report	Dennis 57'; Álvarez (yellow card) 89'	Stadium: Ghelamco Arena; Attendance: 20,000; Referee: Lawrence Visser

26 December 2019 20	Club Brugge	4–0	Zulte Waregem	Bruges
18:00 CET (UTC+1)	Diatta 30'; Mata (yellow card) 45+2'; Okereke 61', 64'; Vormer 90+2'	Report	Sissako (yellow card) 22'; Govea (yellow card) 32'	Stadium: Jan Breydel Stadium; Attendance: 29,472; Referee: Jonathan Lardot

19 January 2020 21	Anderlecht	1–2	Club Brugge	Anderlecht
18:00 CET (UTC+1)	Colassin 21'	Report	Vanaken 40', 80'; Mechele (yellow card) 67'; Sobol (yellow card) 90+5'	Stadium: Constant Vanden Stock Stadium; Attendance: 20,394; Referee: Lawrence Visser

26 January 2020 22	Kortrijk	2–2	Club Brugge	Kortrijk
18:00 CET (UTC+1)	Kage (yellow card) 17'; Ezekiel (yellow card) 31'; Mboyo 42', (yellow card) 56'; Moffi 47'; Van der Bruggen (yellow card) 61'; Golubović (yellow card) 86'	Report	Deli 8'; Ricca 39', (yellow card) 85'	Stadium: Guldensporen Stadion; Attendance: 9,399; Referee: Bram Van Driessche

29 January 2020 23	Sporting Charleroi	0–0	Club Brugge	Charleroi
20:30 CET (UTC+1)	Nicholson (yellow card) 61'	Report	Vormer (yellow card) 71'; Mata (yellow card) 86'	Stadium: Stade du Pays de Charleroi; Attendance: 12,090; Referee: Nicolas Laforge

2 February 2020 24	Club Brugge	1–0	Antwerp	Bruges
14:30 CET (UTC+1)	Dennis (yellow card) 27'; Vanaken 84'; Sobol (yellow card) 90+1'	Report	Rodrigues (yellow card) 27'; Arslanagić (yellow card) 28'	Stadium: Jan Breydel Stadium; Attendance: 26,000; Referee: Erik Lambrechts

12 February 2020 25	Standard Liège	0–0	Club Brugge	Liège
20:30 CET (UTC+1)	Oularé (yellow card) 53'; Amallah (yellow card) 64'	Report	Deli (yellow card) 49'; Vormer (yellow card) 53'	Stadium: Stade Maurice Dufrasne; Attendance: 27,145; Referee: Lawrence Visser

15 February 2020 26	Club Brugge	2–1	Waasland-Beveren	Bruges
18:00 CET (UTC+1)	Rits 41', 90+6'; Sobol (yellow card) 55'; Diatta (yellow card) 79'	Report	Schryvers (yellow card) 27'; Bizimana (yellow card) 35'; Sula (yellow card) 45+1'; Dierckx 53'; Kobayashi (yellow card) 57'; Jackers (yellow card) 82'; Agyepong (yellow card) 90' (yellow-red card) 90+1'	Stadium: Jan Breydel Stadium; Attendance: 21,644; Referee: Nathan Verboomen

23 February 2020 27	Club Brugge	1–0	Sporting Charleroi	Bruges
14:30 CET (UTC+1)	Álvarez 1'	Report	Ilaimaharitra (yellow card) 87'	Stadium: Jan Breydel Stadium; Attendance: 27,039; Referee: Lothar D'hondt

1 March 2020 28	Genk	1–2	Club Brugge	Genk
14:30 CET (UTC+1)	Ito 9'; Wouters (yellow card) 62'; Kouassi (yellow card) 72'	Report	De Ketelaere 3'; Diatta (yellow card) 62'; Mata (yellow card) 64'; Álvarez (yellow card) 71'; Rits 89'; Sobol (yellow card) 90+4'	Stadium: Luminus Arena; Attendance: 24,956; Referee: Erik Lambrechts

7 March 2020 29	Club Brugge	2–1	Cercle Brugge	Bruges
20:00 CET (UTC+1)	Vanaken 39'; Diatta 59'	Report	Hazard 90+1'	Stadium: Jan Breydel Stadium; Referee: Wesley Alen

15 March 2020 30	Eupen	Cancelled	Club Brugge	Eupen
18:00 CET (UTC+1)				Stadium: Kehrwegstadion
Note: The match was cancelled due to the COVID-19 pandemic.

=== Belgian Cup ===
25 September 2019 Sixth round	Francs Borains	0–3	Club Brugge	Boussu
20:30 CEST (UTC+2)	Vandermeulen (yellow card) 82'	Report	Tau 72'; Vormer (yellow card) 73'; Okereke 81', 85'	Stadium: Stade Robert Urbain; Referee: Frederik Geldhof

4 December 2019 Seventh round	Oostende	1–1 (a.e.t.) (2–4 p)	Club Brugge	Ostend
20:30 CET (UTC+1)	Sylla 3'; Sané (yellow card) 74' (yellow-red card) 76'; Faes (yellow card) 108'	Report	Diatta 73'; Openda (yellow card) 74'	Stadium: Versluys Arena; Attendance: 6,004; Referee: Jonathan Lardot
	Penalties
	Neto (penalty missed); Milović (penalty scored); Palaversa (penalty scored); Ndenbe (penalty missed)		(penalty scored) Vanaken; (penalty scored) Vormer; (penalty scored) Schrijvers; (penalty scored) Álvarez

19 December 2019 Quarter-final	Anderlecht	0–2	Club Brugge	Anderlecht
20:45 CET (UTC+1)	Saelemaekers (yellow card) 67'	Report	Vormer 48'; Álvarez 65'	Stadium: Constant Vanden Stock Stadium; Attendance: 20,000; Referee: Bram Van Driessche

22 January 2020 Semi-final 1st leg	Club Brugge	1–1	Zulte Waregem	Bruges
20:45 CET (UTC+1)	Rits 54'; Mata (yellow card) 76'	Report	Berahino 60'; Walsh (yellow card) 70'; Deschacht (yellow card) 89'	Stadium: Jan Breydel Stadium; Attendance: 20,000; Referee: Wesley Alen

5 February 2020 Semi-final 2nd leg	Zulte Waregem	1–2 (2–3 agg.)	Club Brugge	Waregem
20:45 CET (UTC+1)	Oberlin 78'	Report	Krmenčík (yellow card) 44'; Mechele 54'; De Ketelaere 87'	Stadium: Regenboogstadion; Attendance: 10,353; Referee: Alexandre Boucaut

1 August 2020 Final	Club Brugge	0–1	Antwerp	Brussels
20:30 CEST (UTC+2)	Balanta (yellow card) 39'; Sobol (yellow card) 60'; Rits (yellow card) 76'; Vormer (yellow card) 90+8'	Report	Refaelov 25'; Pius (yellow card) 32'; Matijaš (yellow card) 82'; Haroun (yellow card) 90+8'	Stadium: King Baudouin Stadium; Attendance: 0 Referee: Nicolas Laforge
Note: The match was postponed due to the COVID-19 pandemic, and rescheduled to 1 August.

=== UEFA Champions League ===
==== Third qualifying round ====
6 August 2019 First leg	Club Brugge (Belgium)	1–0	(Ukraine) Dynamo Kyiv	Bruges, Belgium
20:30 CEST (UTC+2)	Deli (yellow card) 20'; Vanaken 67' (pen.); Dennis (yellow card) 39'	Report	Harmash (yellow card) 41'; Kędziora (yellow card) 44'; Rodrigues (yellow card) 68'; Sydorchuk (yellow card) 79'; Kádár (yellow card) 82'	Stadium: Jan Breydel Stadium; Attendance: 27,018; Referee: Xavier Estrada Fernández (Spain)

13 August 2019 Second leg	Dynamo Kyiv (Ukraine)	3–3 (3–4 agg.)	(Belgium) Club Brugge	Kyiv, Ukraine
19:30 CEST (UTC+2)	Buyalskyi 6'; Shepelyev 50'; Mykolenko (yellow card) 55'; Kádár (yellow card) 57'; Burda (yellow card) 60' (yellow-red card) 82'; Mechele 90+3' (o.g.)	Report	Tau (yellow card) 9' (yellow-red card) 84'; Mata (yellow card) 22'; Deli 38'; Okereke (yellow card) 79'; Vanaken (yellow card) 86'; Vormer 88'; Openda 90+5', (yellow card) 90+6'	Stadium: NSC Olimpiyskiy; Attendance: 42,152; Referee: Ivan Bebek (Croatia)

==== Play-off round ====
20 August 2019 First leg	LASK (Austria)	0–1	(Belgium) Club Brugge	Linz, Austria
21:00 CEST (UTC+2)	Renner (yellow card) 16'; Trauner (yellow card) 51'; Wiesinger (yellow card) 73'; Frieser (yellow card) 79'	Report	Vanaken 10' (pen.); Mata (yellow card) 53'	Stadium: Linzer Stadion; Attendance: 12,637; Referee: Szymon Marciniak (Poland)

28 August 2019 Second leg	Club Brugge (Belgium)	2–1 (3–1 agg.)	(Austria) LASK	Bruges, Belgium
21:00 CEST (UTC+2)	Vanaken 70'; Rits (yellow card) 73'; Dennis 89'	Report	Michorl (yellow card) 55'; Trauner (yellow card) 72' (yellow-red card) 81'; Klauss 74' (pen.); Wiesinger (yellow card) 90+4'	Stadium: Jan Breydel Stadium; Attendance: 25,319; Referee: Felix Brych (Germany)

==== Group stage ====
Pos	Team	Pld	W	D	L	GF	GA	GD	Pts	Qualification	PAR	RMA	BRU	GAL
1	(France) Paris Saint-Germain	6	5	1	0	17	2	+15	16	Advance to knockout phase	—	3–0	1–0	5–0
2	(Spain) Real Madrid	6	3	2	1	14	8	+6	11	Advance to knockout phase	2–2	—	2–2	6–0
3	(Belgium) Club Brugge	6	0	3	3	4	12	−8	3	Transfer to Europa League	0–5	1–3	—	0–0
4	(Turkey) Galatasaray	6	0	2	4	1	14	−13	2		0–1	0–1	1–1	—

Source: UEFA
Rules for classification: Group stage tiebreakers

18 September 2019 1	Club Brugge (Belgium)	0–0	(Turkey) Galatasaray	Bruges, Belgium
21:00 CEST (UTC+2)	Openda (yellow card) 73'; Vormer (yellow card) 81'	Report	Lemina (yellow card) 56'; Nzonzi (yellow card) 73'; Donk (yellow card) 90+4'	Stadium: Jan Breydel Stadium; Attendance: 26,616; Referee: Slavko Vinčić (Slovenia)

1 October 2019 2	Real Madrid (Spain)	2–2	(Belgium) Club Brugge	Madrid, Spain
18:55 CEST (UTC+2)	Ramos 55'; Casemiro 85'; Hazard (yellow card) 90+2'	Report	Dennis 9', 39'; Mignolet (yellow card) 69'; Openda (yellow card) 77'; Vormer (yellow card) 78' (yellow-red card) 84'	Stadium: Santiago Bernabéu; Attendance: 65,112; Referee: Georgi Kabakov (Bulgaria)

22 October 2019 3	Club Brugge (Belgium)	0–5	(France) Paris Saint-Germain	Bruges, Belgium
21:00 CEST (UTC+2)	De Katelaere (yellow card) 33'; Rits (yellow card) 77'	Report	Icardi 7', 63'; Choupo-Moting (yellow card) 15'; Mbappé 61', 79', 83'; Verratti (yellow card) 73'; Meunier (yellow card) 85'	Stadium: Jan Breydel Stadium; Attendance: 26,946; Referee: Daniel Siebert (Germany)

6 November 2019 4	Paris Saint-Germain (France)	1–0	(Belgium) Club Brugge	Paris, France
21:00 CET (UTC+1)	Icardi 22'; Verratti (yellow card) 54'; Thiago Silva (yellow card) 74'	Report	Álvarez (yellow card) 26'	Stadium: Parc des Princes; Attendance: 47,418; Referee: Bobby Madden (Scotland)

26 November 2019 5	Galatasaray (Turkey)	1–1	(Belgium) Club Brugge	Istanbul, Turkey
18:55 CET (UTC+1)	Büyük 11'; Lemina (yellow card) 14'; Mariano (yellow card) 33'; Nagatomo (yellow card) 84'; Mor (yellow card) 90'; Muslera (yellow card) 90+1'	Report	Ricca (yellow card) 28'; Mata (yellow card) 31' (yellow-red card) 90+3'; Diatta (yellow card) 66' (yellow-red card) 90+3', (goal) 90+2'	Stadium: Türk Telekom Stadium; Attendance: 34,500; Referee: Ivan Kružliak (Slovakia)

11 December 2019 6	Club Brugge (Belgium)	1–3	(Spain) Real Madrid	Bruges, Belgium
21:00 CET (UTC+1)	Balanta (yellow card) 15'; Kossounou (yellow card) 22'; Sobol (yellow card) 34'; Vanaken 55'	Report	Modrić (yellow card) 6', (goal) 90+1'; Casemiro (yellow card) 37'; Rodrygo 53'; Vinícius 64'	Stadium: Jan Breydel Stadium; Attendance: 27,308; Referee: Tobias Stieler (Germany)

=== UEFA Europa League ===
==== Knockout phase ====
===== Round of 32 =====
20 February 2020 First leg	Club Brugge (Belgium)	1–1	(England) Manchester United	Bruges, Belgium
18:55 CET (UTC+1)	Dennis 15'; Álvarez (yellow card) 39'; Vanaken (yellow card) 53'; Mechele (yellow card) 90+3'	Report	Martial 36'; Pereira (yellow card) 69'	Stadium: Jan Breydel Stadium; Attendance: 27,006; Referee: Aleksei Kulbakov (Belarus)

27 February 2020 Second leg	Manchester United (England)	5–0 (6–1 agg.)	(Belgium) Club Brugge	Manchester, England
21:00 CET (UTC+1)	Fernandes 27' (pen.); Ighalo 34'; McTominay 41'; Fred 82', 90+3'	Report	Deli (red card) 23'	Stadium: Old Trafford; Attendance: 70,397; Referee: Serdar Gözübüyük (Netherlands)

== Statistics ==
=== Squad appearances and goals ===
Last updated on 7 March 2020.

No.	Pos	Nat	Player	Total		Belgian Division		Belgian Cup		UEFA Champions League		UEFA Europa League	
No.	Pos	Nat	Player	Apps	Goals	Apps	Goals	Apps	Goals	Apps	Goals	Apps	Goals
Goalkeepers
22	GK	(United States) USA	Ethan Horvath	3	0	2	0	1	0	0	0	0	0
33	GK	(Belgium) BEL	Nick Shinton	0	0	0	0	0	0	0	0	0	0
88	GK	(Belgium) BEL	Simon Mignolet	43	0	27	0	4	0	10	0	2	0
Defenders
2	DF	(Ukraine) UKR	Eduard Sobol	35	0	23+2	0	3+1	0	6	0	0	0
5	DF	(Ivory Coast) CIV	Odilon Kossounou	12	0	4+3	0	1	0	2	0	2	0
15	DF	(Croatia) CRO	Matej Mitrović	12	0	6+1	0	0	0	4	0	0+1	0
17	DF	(Ivory Coast) CIV	Simon Deli	42	3	26	2	4	0	10	1	2	0
18	DF	(Uruguay) URU	Federico Ricca	15	2	7+1	2	1	0	4+1	0	1	0
19	DF	(Belgium) BEL	Thibault Vlietinck	7	0	2+3	0	1	0	1	0	0	0
21	DF	(Belgium) BEL	Dion Cools	3	0	1+1	0	0	0	0+1	0	0	0
44	DF	(Belgium) BEL	Brandon Mechele	37	1	24	0	5	1	6	0	2	0
77	DF	(Angola) ANG	Clinton Mata	39	0	24+1	0	4	0	8	0	2	0
92	DF	(Belgium) BEL	Ignace Van der Brempt	2	0	0+1	0	1	0	0	0	0	0
95	DF	(Belgium) BEL	Maxim De Cuyper	2	0	0	0	0	0	0	0	2	0
Midfielders
3	MF	(Colombia) COL	Éder Balanta	25	3	13+3	2	3	1	3+2	0	1	0
16	MF	(Belgium) BEL	Siebe Schrijvers	33	4	13+9	4	1+4	0	0+5	0	0+1	0
20	MF	(Belgium) BEL	Hans Vanaken	46	17	28+1	13	4+1	0	10	4	2	0
25	MF	(Netherlands) NED	Ruud Vormer	40	3	26+1	1	5	1	7	1	0+1	0
26	MF	(Belgium) BEL	Mats Rits	34	6	17+3	5	3	1	9	0	2	0
90	MF	(Belgium) BEL	Charles De Ketelaere	24	2	8+5	1	1+4	1	1+3	0	0+2	0
Forwards
7	FW	(Senegal) SEN	Amadou Sagna	0	0	0	0	0	0	0	0	0	0
9	FW	(Czech Republic) CZE	Michael Krmenčík	7	0	2+4	0	1	0	0	0	0	0
10	FW	(Senegal) SEN	Mbaye Diagne	9	4	1+5	4	1	0	0+2	0	0	0
11	FW	(Senegal) SEN	Krépin Diatta	34	9	19+3	7	3	1	6+2	1	0+1	0
14	FW	(Nigeria) NGR	David Okereke	34	11	13+9	9	3	2	6+2	0	1	0
35	FW	(South Africa) RSA	Percy Tau	30	4	12+6	3	2+2	1	5+1	0	2	0
42	FW	(Nigeria) NGR	Emmanuel Dennis	33	9	15+5	5	2	0	9+1	3	1	1
80	FW	(Belgium) BEL	Loïs Openda	25	1	3+12	0	1+2	0	3+4	1	0	0
Players who have made an appearance this season but have left the club
9	FW	(Belgium) BEL	Jelle Vossen	2	0	1+1	0	0	0	0	0	0	0
10	FW	(Iran) IRI	Kaveh Rezaei	1	0	0	0	0	0	0+1	0	0	0
