= Wesley (footballer, born November 1996) =

Brazilian footballer

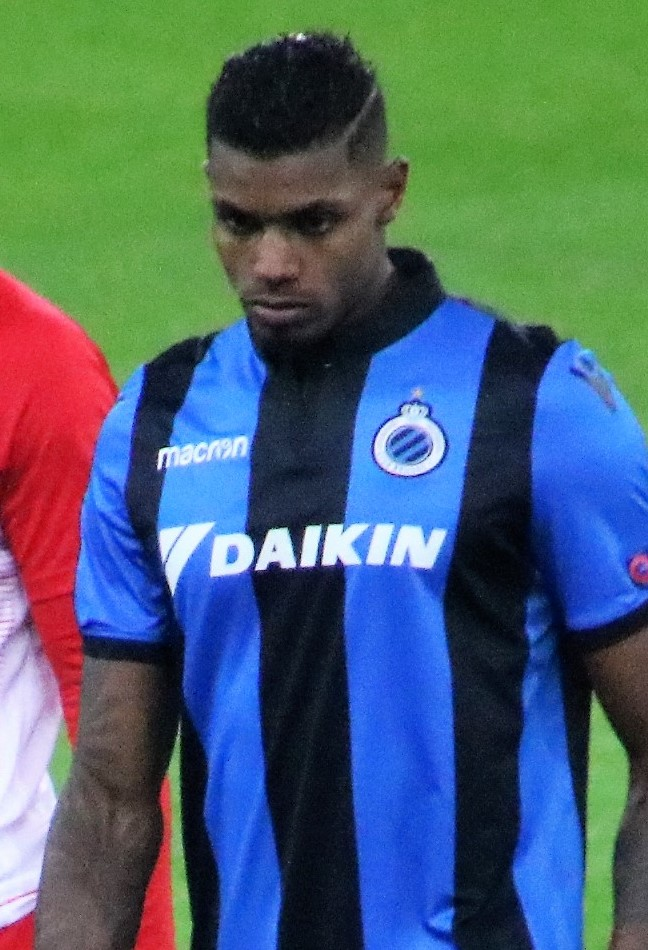
- Wesley with Club Brugge in 2019

Personal information
- Full name: Wesley Moraes Ferreira da Silva
- Date of birth: 24 November 1996 (age 29)
- Place of birth: Juiz de Fora, Brazil
- Height: 1.91 m (6 ft 3 in)
- Position: Forward

Team information
- Current team: Shenzhen Peng City
- Number: 7

Youth career
- 2010: Uberabinha
- 2011: Sport Juiz de Fora
- 2012: Uberabinha
- 2013: Sport Juiz de Fora
- 2013: Atlético Mineiro
- 2013: Tupi

Senior career*
| Years | Team | Apps | (Gls) |
| 2014 | Itabuna | 0 | (0) |
| 2015–2016 | Trenčín | 18 | (6) |
| 2016–2019 | Club Brugge | 107 | (32) |
| 2019–2023 | Aston Villa | 25 | (5) |
| 2021–2022 | → Club Brugge (loan) | 3 | (0) |
| 2022 | → Internacional (loan) | 8 | (0) |
| 2022–2023 | → Levante (loan) | 37 | (3) |
| 2023–2024 | Stoke City | 20 | (0) |
| 2024–2025 | Fatih Karagümrük | 35 | (22) |
| 2025– | Shenzhen Peng City | 41 | (24) |

International career
| 2019 | Brazil | 1 | (0) |
- * Club domestic league appearances and goals as of 8 November 2026

Wesley Moraes Ferreira da Silva (born 24 November 1996), known as Wesley or Wesley Moraes, is a Brazilian professional footballer who plays as a centre forward for Chinese Super League club Shenzhen Peng City.

He began his career at Brazilian side Itabuna before moving to Trenčín in the Slovak Super Liga and subsequently Club Brugge where he won two league titles and was named Belgian Young Professional Footballer of the Year in 2018. He made his international debut for Brazil in November 2019.

== Club career ==
=== Youth career and Itabuna ===
As a youngster Moraes played futsal around his hometown of Juiz de Fora. Moving to football, he represented both Associação Esportiva Uberabinha and Sport Club Juiz de Fora for different periods. In 2013, he also spent three months at Atlético Mineiro, but was released; in that year, he also played for Tupi.

Having joined local side Itabuna at eighteen, Wesley played semi-professionally in the state level Campeonato Baiano in 2014, but stayed at the club for just three months. He later went on trial with European clubs including a lengthy six-month trial at Atlético Madrid's academy side where he played in tournaments in Bilbao and Croatia, and later a three-month trial at AS Nancy; neither club offered him a professional contract. Wesley also trialled with then Ligue 2 side Evian.

=== Trenčín ===
Wesley joined AS Trenčín of the Slovak Super Liga in July 2015, who had become aware of him after his trials in Europe. On 14 July 2015, he played for Trenčín against FCSB in the second round of qualification of the 2015–2016 Champions League. He scored twice for Trenčín in the return match against FCSB, helping his side to a 3–2 win but the club did not proceed to the next round.

=== Club Brugge ===
Wesley moved to Club Brugge on 29 January 2016. He scored his first goal in his debut match against KVC Westerlo. Brugges worked to tone down his aggression during games which led to a number of yellow cards and a sending off in his first season, he wore tape on his hands in a match against Royal Antwerp as a reminder to not react.

=== Aston Villa ===
On 13 June 2019, Wesley signed for Aston Villa in the Premier League, for a fee of £22,000,000. Following a week-long training camp with the rest of the squad, Wesley made his debut for Villa in a friendly match against Minnesota United on 17 July 2019. Wesley scored his first Villa goal in his third appearance, opening the scoring in the 2–0 win over Everton on 23 August, with a first time strike beating Jordan Pickford.

On 1 January 2020, Wesley suffered a severe cruciate knee ligament injury after a tackle from Burnley's Ben Mee. Wesley had scored earlier in the game, a 2–1 win. His injury was initially predicted to take around nine months to recover from. However, the injury was more severe than first thought, and Wesley's time on the sidelines was much longer. He made his return to football on 26 March 2021, over a year later, playing for 45 minutes in a training ground friendly against West Bromwich Albion.

Wesley made his return to competitive football on 25 April 2021, 480 days since his last game, as a late substitute in a 2–2 Premier League draw against West Bromwich Albion.

==== Loans ====
On 28 August 2021, Wesley rejoined Club Brugge on a season-long loan. He made his second debut for Brugge on 18 September 2021, in a 1–0 victory over Charleroi.

On 7 January 2022, Wesley was recalled from his Club Brugge loan, and joined Brazilian club Internacional on a 12-month loan. On 29 January 2022, Wesley made his debut for Internacional – scoring a penalty in a 2–0 victory over Frederiquense in the Campeonato Gaúcho.

On 22 July 2022, Wesley was recalled from his Brazilian loan and moved on loan to Segunda División club Levante. He made his debut on 12 August 2022, in a 0–0 draw with Huesca. Wesley scored his first goal for the club on 3 January 2023, an injury time winner in a 3–2 Copa del Rey victory over Getafe.

=== Stoke City ===
On 28 July 2023, Wesley signed a one-year contract with Stoke City. After failing to score a single goal in 23 appearances for Stoke, Wesley was released at the end of his contract.

=== Fatih Karagümrük ===
On 10 August 2024, Wesley signed for TFF First League club Fatih Karagümrük on a free transfer. The following day, Wesley made his debut as a substitute in a 0–0 draw against Amed. On 18 August 2024, in his first start for Karagümrük, Wesley scored a brace in a 2–2 draw against Çorum.

=== Shenzhen Peng City ===
On 2 July 2025, Wesley joined Chinese Super League club Shenzhen Peng City

== International career ==
Wesley made his international debut for Brazil on 15 November 2019, coming off the bench in a 1–0 loss to Argentina.

== Style of play ==
Wesley was born with one leg almost three centimetres shorter than the other, which has led to comparisons in his movement to legendary compatriot Garrincha. He was also compared with former Aston Villa striker Christian Benteke by Joseph Chapman from the Birmingham Mail, for his strong aerial threat while being confident with the ball at his feet.

== Personal life ==
Wesley grew up in the city of Juiz de Fora, around 200 kilometres from Rio de Janeiro. His father was a footballer who played as a midfielder but only made a small amount of money from playing; Wesley credited his father as having taught him the game of football. His father became partially disabled later in his life and died following a brain tumour when Wesley was nine years of age.

Wesley has three children from different relationships. He fathered his first two children, Yan and Maria Eduarda, as a teenager. He had his first child at the age of 14 and his second at the age of 16. As a sixteen-year-old he worked in a factory sorting screws to support his family between football trials before his move to AS Trencin. He had another child with his new partner, Izadora Magluf, in December 2021.

== Career statistics ==
=== Club ===
As of match played 8 November 2026

Appearances and goals by club, season and competition
| Club | Season | League | | | State League | | National Cup | | League Cup | | Continental | | Other | | Total | |
| Club | Season | Division | Apps | Goals | Apps | Goals | Apps | Goals | Apps | Goals | Apps | Goals | Apps | Goals | Apps | Goals |
|---|---|---|---|---|---|---|---|---|---|---|---|---|---|---|---|---|
| Itabuna | 2014 | Baiano 2ª Divisão | — | | 1 | 0 | — | | — | | — | | — | | 1 | 0 |
| Trenčín | 2015–16 | Slovak Super Liga | 18 | 6 | — | | 2 | 0 | — | | 2 (Note: Appearances in UEFA Champions League) | 2 | — | | 22 | 8 |
| Club Brugge | 2015–16 | Belgian First Division A | 6 | 2 | — | | 0 | 0 | — | | — | | — | | 6 | 2 |
| Club Brugge | 2016–17 | Belgian First Division A | 25 | 6 | — | | 1 | 0 | — | | 5 | 0 | 1 (Note: Appearance in Belgian Super Cup) | 0 | 32 | 6 |
| Club Brugge | 2017–18 | Belgian First Division A | 38 | 11 | — | | 5 | 2 | — | | 1 (Note: Appearance in UEFA Europa League) | 0 | — | | 44 | 13 |
| Club Brugge | 2018–19 | Belgian First Division A | 38 | 13 | — | | 1 | 0 | — | | 8 (Note: Six appearances and two goals in UEFA Champions League, two appearances and one goal in UEFA Europa League) | 3 | 1 | 1 | 48 | 17 |
| Club Brugge | Total | | 107 | 32 | — | | 7 | 2 | — | | 14 | 3 | 2 | 1 | 130 | 38 |
| Aston Villa | 2019–20 | Premier League | 21 | 5 | — | | 0 | 0 | 1 | 1 | — | | — | | 22 | 6 |
| Aston Villa | 2020–21 | Premier League | 3 | 0 | — | | 0 | 0 | 0 | 0 | — | | — | | 3 | 0 |
| Aston Villa | 2021–22 | Premier League | 1 | 0 | — | | 0 | 0 | 0 | 0 | — | | — | | 1 | 0 |
| Aston Villa | 2022–23 | Premier League | 0 | 0 | — | | 0 | 0 | 0 | 0 | — | | — | | 0 | 0 |
| Aston Villa | Total | | 25 | 5 | — | | 0 | 0 | 1 | 1 | — | | — | | 26 | 6 |
| Club Brugge (loan) | 2021–22 | Belgian First Division A | 3 | 0 | — | | 1 | 0 | — | | 0 | 0 | 0 | 0 | 4 | 0 |
| Internacional (loan) | 2022 | Série A | 8 | 0 | 9 | 1 | 1 | 0 | — | | 3 (Note: Appearances in Copa Sudamericana) | 1 | 0 | 0 | 21 | 2 |
| Levante (loan) | 2022–23 | Segunda División | 37 | 3 | — | | 4 | 1 | — | | — | | 2 (Note: Appearances in 2023 Segunda División play-offs) | 0 | 43 | 4 |
| Stoke City | 2023–24 | Championship | 20 | 0 | — | | 1 | 0 | 2 | 0 | — | | — | | 23 | 0 |
| Fatih Karagümrük | 2024–25 | TFF First League | 35 | 22 | — | | 1 | 0 | — | | — | | — | | 36 | 22 |
| Shenzhen Peng City | 2025 | Chinese Super League | 13 | 10 | — | | — | | — | | — | | — | | 13 | 10 |
| Shenzhen Peng City | 2026 | Chinese Super League | 28 | 14 | — | | 2 | 1 | — | | — | | — | | 27 | 13 |
| Shenzhen Peng City | Total | | 41 | 24 | — | | 2 | 1 | — | | — | | — | | 43 | 25 |
| Career total | | | 294 | 92 | 11 | 1 | 18 | 4 | 3 | 1 | 19 | 6 | 4 | 1 | 349 | 104 |

=== International ===
Appearances and goals by national team and year
| National team | Year | Apps | Goals |
|---|---|---|---|
Brazil
| Brazil | 2019 | 1 | 0 |
| Total | | 1 | 0 |

== Honours ==
AS Trenčín

- Slovak League: 2015–16
- Slovak Cup: 2015–16

Club Brugge

- Belgian First Division A: 2015–16, 2017–18
- Belgian Super Cup: 2016, 2018

Individual

- Belgian Young Professional Footballer of the Year: 2017–18
