= 2019–20 Aston Villa F.C. season =

English football club season

Aston Villa
2019–20 season
- Chairman: Nassef Sawiris
- Manager: Dean Smith
- Stadium: Villa Park
- Premier League: 17th
- FA Cup: Third round
- League Cup: Runners-up
- Top goalscorer: League: Jack Grealish (8); All: Jack Grealish (10)
- Highest home attendance: 42,010 (vs. West Ham, 16 September 2019)
- Lowest home attendance: Before Suspension: 40,867 (vs. Watford, 21 January 2020); 0 (All games following suspension)
- Average home league attendance: Before Suspension: 41,661
Home colours	Away colours	Third colours

The 2019–20 Premier League season was Villa's 145th season in English football. It was the club's 25th season in the Premier League, and their 106th season in the top flight, following their promotion from the EFL Championship by winning the play-offs.

On 29 November 2019, midway through his first Premier League season with the club, manager Dean Smith signed a contract extension lasting until 2023.

In the EFL Cup, Villa advanced past Crewe Alexandra of League Two and four Premier League sides in Brighton & Hove Albion, Wolverhampton Wanderers, Liverpool and Leicester City to reach the final at Wembley Stadium; they lost the final 2–1 to Manchester City.

As a result of the suspension of competitive football in March 2020 due to the COVID-19 pandemic, Villa were unable to play any match for 3 months since the Premier League match on 9 March. A restart of the league was made on 17 June, with Villa returning to action on the same day.

Villa were four points deep inside the relegation zone with four games left to play of the 2019–20 season, but pulled off what Smith described as a "magnificent achievement" to clinch survival on the last day with a 1–1 draw at West Ham United.

This season was the first since 2010-11 without Alan Hutton, who departed following the expiration of his contract before retiring in February 2020, and Gary Gardner, who joined Birmingham City after spending the previous season on loan at the club, and the first since 2014–15 without Mark Bunn and Micah Richards, who both retired following the expiration of their contracts.

== Pre-season ==
On 7 June 2019, Aston Villa announced its pre-season schedule.

Win Loss Draw

July

17 July 2019	Minnesota United (United States)	0–3	Aston Villa	St Paul, MN
19:00 CDT	Ng'anzi (yellow card) 75'	Report	Grealish 35'; Lansbury 82'; Bjarnason 85'	Stadium: Allianz Field; Attendance: 18,335

21 July 2019	Shrewsbury Town	0–1	Aston Villa	Shrewsbury
14:00 BST	Williams (yellow card) 88'	Report	Grealish (yellow card) 12'; Steer (yellow card) 63'; Hogan 65'	Stadium: New Meadow; Attendance: 9,322; Referee: John Brooks

24 July 2019	Walsall	1–5	Aston Villa	Walsall
19:45 BST	Sinclair 26'	Report	Jota 7', 42'; Wesley 9', 25' (pen.); Grealish 59'	Stadium: Bescot Stadium; Attendance: 8,400

27 July 2019	Charlton Athletic	1–4	Aston Villa	Charlton, London
15:00 BST	Taylor 64' (pen.)	Report	El Ghazi 43'; Green 54'; McGinn 56', 82'	Stadium: The Valley; Attendance: 7,532; Referee: Charles Breakspear

August

3 August 2019	RB Leipzig (Germany)	1–3	Aston Villa	Leipzig
15:30 CEST	Poulsen 28'; Konate (yellow card) 79'; Werner (yellow card) 81'	Report	Hourihane 16', 82'; Guilbert (yellow card) 63'; El Ghazi (yellow card) 78'; Mings (yellow card) 81'; McGinn 89'	Stadium: Red Bull Arena; Attendance: 15,811; Referee: Steven Greif

4 August 2019	RB Leipzig (Germany)	0–1	Aston Villa	Leipzig
12:00 CEST		Report	Kodjia 87'	Stadium: RB Leipzig Training Centre, Cottaweg; Attendance: 0

June

6 June 2020	Aston Villa	2–2	West Bromwich Albion	Aston, Birmingham
15:00 BST	Davis; Grealish	Report	Grosicki; Krovinovic	Stadium: Villa Park; Attendance: 0
Note: Friendly organised as a way to regain fitness before the resumption of the Premier League and Championship.

10 June 2020	Leicester City	0–3	Aston Villa	Leicester
18:00 BST		Report	Trézéguet; Unknown; Unknown	Stadium: King Power Stadium; Attendance: 0
Note: Friendly organised as a way to regain fitness before the resumption of the Premier League.

== Premier League ==
Villa were four points deep inside the relegation zone with four games left to play of the 2019–20 season, but pulled off what Smith described as a "magnificent achievement" to clinch survival on the last day with a 1–1 draw at West Ham United.

Pos	Team	Pld	W	D	L	GF	GA	GD	Pts	Qualification or relegation
15	Brighton & Hove Albion	38	9	14	15	39	54	−15	41	
16	West Ham United	38	10	9	19	49	62	−13	39	
17	Aston Villa	38	9	8	21	41	67	−26	35	
18	Bournemouth (R)	38	9	7	22	40	65	−25	34	Relegation to EFL Championship
19	Watford (R)	38	8	10	20	36	64	−28	34	Relegation to EFL Championship

Source: Premier League
Rules for classification: 1) Points; 2) Goal difference; 3) Goals scored; 4) If the champions, relegated teams or qualified teams for UEFA competitions cannot be determined by rules 1 to 3, rules 4.1 to 4.3 are applied – 4.1) Points gained in head to head record between such teams; 4.2) Away goals scored in head to head record between such teams; 4.3) Play-offs
(R) Relegated

Results summary

Overall								Home						Away					
Pld	W	D	L	GF	GA	GD	Pts	W	D	L	GF	GA	GD	W	D	L	GF	GA	GD
38	9	8	21	41	67	−26	35	7	3	9	22	30	−8	2	5	12	19	37	−18

Last updated: 26 July 2020.

=== Matches ===
On 13 June 2019, the Premier League fixtures were announced. On 5 April 2020, the season was suspended indefinitely due to the COVID-19 pandemic in the United Kingdom. On 28 May 2020, a date for the resumption of the Premier League was given as the 17 June 2020. A full fixture list was confirmed on 4 June 2020 - which had the season returning at 6 PM on 17 June.

10 August 2019 1	Tottenham Hotspur	3–1	Aston Villa	Tottenham, London
17:30 BST	Ndombele 73'; Kane 86', 90'; Lamela (yellow card) 87'	Report	McGinn 9'	Stadium: Tottenham Hotspur Stadium; Attendance: 44,426 (344 away); Referee: Chris Kavanagh
Note: Live on Sky Sports

17 August 2019 2	Aston Villa	1–2	Bournemouth	Aston, Birmingham
15:00 BST	Douglas Luiz 71'	Report	King 2' (pen.); H. Wilson 12'; Billing (yellow card) 36'; Aké (yellow card) 59'	Stadium: Villa Park; Attendance: 32,665 (2,745 away); Referee: Martin Atkinson

23 August 2019 3	Aston Villa	2–0	Everton	Aston, Birmingham
20:00 BST	Guilbert (yellow card) 5'; Wesley 22'; Trézéguet (yellow card) 85'; El Ghazi 90+5'	Report	Calvert-Lewin (yellow card) 52'; Gomes (yellow card) 80'; Coleman (yellow card) 85'	Stadium: Villa Park; Attendance: 43,640 (2,936 away); Referee: Michael Oliver
Note: Live on Sky Sports

31 August 2019 4	Crystal Palace	1–0	Aston Villa	Selhurst, London
15:00 BST	Milivojević (yellow card) 58'; Kouyaté (yellow card) 71'; Ayew 73'	Report	Douglas Luiz (yellow card) 17'; Taylor (yellow card) 35'; Guilbert (yellow card) 40'; Trézéguet (yellow card) 44' (yellow-red card) 54'; Grealish (yellow card) 90+6'	Stadium: Selhurst Park; Attendance: 25,248 (3,015 away); Referee: Kevin Friend

16 September 2019 5	Aston Villa	0–0	West Ham United	Aston, Birmingham
20:00 BST	Grealish (yellow card) 28'; Mings (yellow card) 77'	Report	Masuaku (yellow card) 23' (yellow-red card) 67'; Noble (yellow card) 29'	Stadium: Villa Park; Attendance: 42,010 (3,000 away); Referee: Mike Dean
Note: Live on Sky Sports

22 September 2019 6	Arsenal	3–2	Aston Villa	Islington, London
16:30 BST	Maitland-Niles (yellow card) 11' (yellow-red card) 41'; Xhaka (yellow card) 35'; Guendouzi (yellow card) 44'; Pépé 59' (pen.), (yellow card) 85'; Chambers 81'; Aubameyang 84', (yellow card) 90+5'; Leno (yellow card) 90+2'	Report	McGinn 20'; Wesley 60'; Engels (yellow card) 83'	Stadium: Emirates Stadium; Attendance: 60,331 (3,003 away); Referee: Jonathan Moss

28 September 2019 7	Aston Villa	2–2	Burnley	Aston, Birmingham
15:00 BST	El Ghazi 33'; McGinn 79'; Trézéguet (yellow card) 86'	Report	Barnes (yellow card) 23'; Tarkowski (yellow card) 44'; Rodriguez 68', (yellow card) 90+7'; Westwood (yellow card) 77'; Wood 81'	Stadium: Villa Park; Attendance: 41,546 (2,965 away); Referee: Lee Mason

5 October 2019 8	Norwich City	1–5	Aston Villa	Norwich
15:00 BST	Pukki (yellow card) 32'; Drmić 87'	Report	Wesley 14', 30'; McGinn (yellow card) 42'; Grealish 49'; Hourihane 61', (yellow card) 62'; Guilbert (yellow card) 73'; Douglas Luiz 83'	Stadium: Carrow Road; Attendance: 27,045 (2,669 away); Referee: Andrew Madley

19 October 2019 9	Aston Villa	2–1	Brighton & Hove Albion	Aston, Birmingham
15:00 BST	Hourihane (yellow card) 19'; Grealish 45+2'; Targett 90+4'	Report	Webster 21'; Mooy (yellow card) 30' (yellow-red card) 35'; Montoya (yellow card) 53'; March (yellow card) 87'	Stadium: Villa Park; Attendance: 41,826 (3,000 away); Referee: David Coote

26 October 2019 10	Manchester City	3–0	Aston Villa	Manchester
12:30 BST	Sterling 46'; Fernandinho (yellow card) 57' (yellow-red card) 87'; D. Silva 65'; Gündoğan 70', (yellow card) 81'	Report	Grealish (yellow card) 36'	Stadium: Etihad Stadium; Attendance: 54,506 (3,010 away); Referee: Graham Scott
Note: Live on BT Sport

2 November 2019 11	Aston Villa	1–2	Liverpool	Aston, Birmingham
15:00 GMT	Trézéguet 21'; El Ghazi (yellow card) 81'	Report	Mané (yellow card) 37', (goal) 90+4'; Van Dijk (yellow card) 58'; Robertson 87'	Stadium: Villa Park; Attendance: 41,878 (3,001 away); Referee: Jonathan Moss

10 November 2019 12	Wolverhampton Wanderers	2–1	Aston Villa	Wolverhampton
14:00 GMT	Saïss (yellow card) 12'; Neves 41'; Jota (yellow card) 74'; Jiménez 84'; Moutinho (yellow card) 87'; Jonny (yellow card) 90+1'	Report	Guilbert (yellow card) 10'; Nakamba (yellow card) 27'; Mings (yellow card) 40'; Trézéguet 90+2'	Stadium: Molineux Stadium; Attendance: 31,607 (2,970 away); Referee: Anthony Taylor
Note: Live on Sky Sports

25 November 2019 13	Aston Villa	2–0	Newcastle United	Aston, Birmingham
20:00 GMT	Hourihane 32'; El Ghazi 36'; Wesley (yellow card) 80'	Report	Fernández (yellow card) 35'	Stadium: Villa Park; Attendance: 41,821 (3,000 away); Referee: Lee Mason
Note: Live on Sky Sports

1 December 2019 14	Manchester United	2–2	Aston Villa	Greater Manchester
16:30 GMT	Maguire (yellow card) 7'; Fred (yellow card) 24'; Heaton 42' (o.g.); Williams (yellow card) 62'; Lindelöf 64'; Shaw (yellow card) 89'	Report	Grealish 11'; Guilbert (yellow card) 45+3'; Mings 66'	Stadium: Old Trafford; Attendance: 73,381 (3,101 away); Referee: Craig Pawson

4 December 2019 15	Chelsea	2–1	Aston Villa	Fulham, London
19:30 GMT	Abraham 24'; Mount (yellow card) 45', (goal) 48'; Kovačić (yellow card) 81'	Report	Trézéguet 41'; Targett (yellow card) 64'	Stadium: Stamford Bridge; Attendance: 40,628 (2,990 away); Referee: Chris Kavanagh
Note: Live on Amazon Prime

8 December 2019 16	Aston Villa	1–4	Leicester City	Aston, Birmingham
14:00 GMT	Mings (yellow card) 13'; Nakamba (yellow card) 36'; Grealish 45+2', (yellow card) 90+1'; Wesley (yellow card) 45+3'; Targett (yellow card) 50'; McGinn (yellow card) 60'	Report	Vardy 21', 75'; Iheanacho (yellow card) 38', (goal) 41'; Pereira (yellow card) 45+1'; Evans 49'	Stadium: Villa Park; Attendance: 41,908 (3,012 away); Referee: Michael Oliver
Note: Live on Sky Sports

14 December 2019 17	Sheffield United	2–0	Aston Villa	Sheffield
15:00 GMT	Norwood (yellow card) 12'; Fleck (yellow card) 16', (goal) 50', 73'	Report	Hause (yellow card) 64'; Targett (yellow card) 69'	Stadium: Bramall Lane; Attendance: 30,396 (2,865 away); Referee: Peter Bankes

21 December 2019 18	Aston Villa	1–3	Southampton	Aston, Birmingham
15:00 GMT	El Ghazi (yellow card) 67'; Grealish 75'; Kodjia (yellow card) 87'	Report	Ings 21', 51'; Stephens 31'; Ward-Prowse (yellow card) 44'	Stadium: Villa Park; Attendance: 41,834 (3,000 away); Referee: Craig Pawson

26 December 2019 19	Aston Villa	1–0	Norwich City	Aston, Birmingham
15:00 GMT	Hourihane 64'; Wesley (yellow card) 88'; Douglas Luiz (yellow card) 89'	Report	Tettey (yellow card) 35'; Pukki (yellow card) 42'; Trybull (yellow card) 74'	Stadium: Villa Park; Attendance: 41,289 (1,568 away); Referee: Chris Kavanagh

28 December 2019 20	Watford	3–0	Aston Villa	Watford
15:00 GMT	Deeney 42', 67' (pen.), (yellow card) 90+2'; Mariappa (yellow card) 51' (yellow-red card) 57'; Sarr 71', (yellow card) 84'; Capoue (yellow card) 75'	Report	Grealish (yellow card) 90+5'	Stadium: Vicarage Road; Attendance: 21,348 (2,204 away); Referee: Simon Hooper

1 January 2020 21	Burnley	1–2	Aston Villa	Burnley
12:30 GMT	Tarkowski (yellow card) 60'; Wood 80'	Report	Wesley 27'; Grealish 41'; Taylor (yellow card) 48'	Stadium: Turf Moor; Attendance: 19,561 (2,166 away); Referee: Michael Oliver
Note: Live on BT Sport

12 January 2020 22	Aston Villa	1–6	Manchester City	Aston, Birmingham
16:30 GMT	El Ghazi (yellow card) 53', (goal) 90+1' (pen.); Grealish (yellow card) 80'	Report	Mahrez 18', 24'; Agüero 28', 57', 81'; Gabriel Jesus 45+1'; Fernandinho (yellow card) 50'	Stadium: Villa Park; Attendance: 41,823 (3,012 away); Referee: Jonathan Moss
Note: Live on Sky Sports

18 January 2020 23	Brighton & Hove Albion	1–1	Aston Villa	Brighton
15:00 GMT	Trossard 38'; Dunk (yellow card) 43'; Webster (yellow card) 90+1'; Maupay (yellow card) 90+5'	Report	Drinkwater (yellow card) 14'; Grealish 75'; Nakamba (yellow card) 81'; Hourihane (yellow card) 90+5'	Stadium: Falmer Stadium; Attendance: 30,551 (3,097 away); Referee: Andrew Madley

21 January 2020 24	Aston Villa	2–1	Watford	Aston, Birmingham
19:30 GMT	Mings (yellow card) 45+1', (goal) 90+5'; Douglas Luiz 68', (yellow card) 68'	Report	Deeney 38'; Cathcart (yellow card) 77'; Doucouré (yellow card) 81'	Stadium: Villa Park; Attendance: 40,867 (2,527 away); Referee: Martin Atkinson

1 February 2020 25	Bournemouth	2–1	Aston Villa	Bournemouth
15:00 GMT	Lerma (yellow card) 18' (yellow-red card) 51'; Billing 37'; Aké 44'; C. Wilson (yellow card) 65'	Report	Mings (yellow card) 36'; Douglas Luiz (yellow card) 43'; Samatta 70'; Hause (yellow card) 90+1'	Stadium: Vitality Stadium; Attendance: 10,722 (1,325 away); Referee: Anthony Taylor

16 February 2020 26	Aston Villa	2–3	Tottenham Hotspur	Aston, Birmingham
14:00 GMT	Alderweireld 9' (o.g.); Engels 53'; Guilbert (yellow card) 86'; Nakamba (yellow card) 90+2'	Report	Alderweireld 27'; Son 45+2', 90+4'	Stadium: Villa Park; Attendance: 41,874 (3,012 away); Referee: Martin Atkinson
Note: Live on Sky Sports

22 February 2020 27	Southampton	2–0	Aston Villa	Southampton
15:00 GMT	Long 8'; Armstrong 90+5', (yellow card) 90+6'	Report	Konsa (yellow card) 45+4'; Reina (yellow card) 72'; Guilbert (yellow card) 90'; Grealish (yellow card) 90+6'	Stadium: St Mary's Stadium; Attendance: 31,478 (3,345 away); Referee: Craig Pawson

9 March 2020 28	Leicester City	4–0	Aston Villa	Leicester
20:00 GMT	Barnes 40', 85'; Vardy 63' (pen.), 79'; Praet (yellow card) 71'; Evans (yellow card) 76'	Report	Hourihane (yellow card) 43'	Stadium: King Power Stadium; Attendance: 32,125 (3,305 away); Referee: Michael Oliver
Note: Live on Sky Sports

17 June 2020 29	Aston Villa	0–0	Sheffield United	Aston, Birmingham
18:00 BST	Douglas Luiz (yellow card) 27'	Report	Lundstram (yellow card) 36'	Stadium: Villa Park; Attendance: 0 Referee: Michael Oliver
Note: The match was postponed due to Aston Villa's participation in the EFL Cup Final on 1 March, then again because of the COVID-19 pandemic. It was rescheduled to 17 June. Live on Sky Sports.

21 June 2020 30	Aston Villa	1–2	Chelsea	Aston, Birmingham
16:15 BST	Hause 43'; Konsa (yellow card) 45'; Grealish (yellow card) 90+6'	Report	Pulisic 60'; Giroud 62'; Kanté (yellow card) 90+4'	Stadium: Villa Park; Attendance: 0 Referee: Paul Tierney
Note: The match was postponed on 13 March due to concerns over the COVID-19 pandemic. It was rescheduled to 21 June. Live on Sky Sports.

24 June 2020 31	Newcastle United	1–1	Aston Villa	Newcastle upon Tyne
18:00 BST	Lascelles (yellow card) 59'; Gayle 68'; Fernández (yellow card) 74'	Report	Douglas Luiz (yellow card) 45+1'; Elmohamady 83'; Hause (yellow card) 90'	Stadium: St James' Park; Attendance: 0 Referee: Chris Kavanagh
Note: The match was postponed on 13 March due to concerns over the COVID-19 pandemic. It was rescheduled to 24 June. Live on BT Sport.

27 June 2020 32	Aston Villa	0–1	Wolverhampton Wanderers	Aston, Birmingham
12:30 BST	Mings (yellow card) 18'	Report	Dendoncker 62'; Neves (yellow card) 90+4'	Stadium: Villa Park; Attendance: 0 Referee: Craig Pawson
Note: The match was postponed on 13 March due to concerns over the COVID-19 pandemic. It was rescheduled to 27 June. Live on BT Sport.

5 July 2020 33	Liverpool	2–0	Aston Villa	Liverpool
16:30 BST	Robertson (yellow card) 20'; Mané 71'; Jones 89'	Report	McGinn (yellow card) 36'	Stadium: Anfield; Attendance: 0 Referee: Paul Tierney
Note: The match was postponed on 19 March due to concerns over the COVID-19 pandemic. It was rescheduled to 5 July. Live on Sky Sports.

9 July 2020 34	Aston Villa	0–3	Manchester United	Aston, Birmingham
20:15 BST	Konsa (yellow card) 52'; Nakamba (yellow card) 81'	Report	Fernandes 27' (pen.); Wan-Bissaka (yellow card) 40'; Matić (yellow card) 45+3'; Greenwood 45+5'; Pogba 58'; Fred (yellow card) 87'	Stadium: Villa Park; Attendance: 0 Referee: Jonathan Moss
Note: The match was postponed on 19 March due to concerns over the COVID-19 pandemic. It was rescheduled to 9 July. Live on Sky Sports.

12 July 2020 35	Aston Villa	2–0	Crystal Palace	Aston, Birmingham
14:15 BST	Mings (yellow card) 27'; Trézéguet 45+4', 59'; Douglas Luiz (yellow card) 90+1'	Report	Zaha (yellow card) 27'; Sakho (yellow card) 27'; Kouyaté (yellow card) 54'; Milivojević (yellow card) 67'; Benteke (red card) 90+6'	Stadium: Villa Park; Attendance: 0 Referee: Martin Atkinson
Note: The match was postponed on 19 March due to concerns over the COVID-19 pandemic. It was rescheduled to 12 July. Live on Sky Sports.

16 July 2020 36	Everton	1–1	Aston Villa	Liverpool
18:00 BST	Digne (yellow card) 56'; Richarlison (yellow card) 61'; Walcott 87'	Report	Elmohamady (yellow card) 71'; Konsa 72'	Stadium: Goodison Park; Attendance: 0 Referee: Anthony Taylor
Note: The match was postponed on 3 April due to concerns over the COVID-19 pandemic. It was rescheduled to 16 July. Live on Sky Sports.

21 July 2020 37	Aston Villa	1–0	Arsenal	Aston, Birmingham
20:15 BST	Trézéguet 27'; Douglas Luiz (yellow card) 71'; Targett (yellow card) 87'	Report	Torreira (yellow card) 35'; Lacazette (yellow card) 61'; Kolašinac (yellow card) 80'; Willock (yellow card) 90+1'	Stadium: Villa Park; Attendance: 0 Referee: Chris Kavanagh
Note: The match was postponed on 3 April due to concerns over the COVID-19 pandemic. It was rescheduled to 21 July.

26 July 2020 38	West Ham United	1–1	Aston Villa	Stratford, London
16:00 BST	Antonio (yellow card) 23'; Fredericks (yellow card) 51'; Yarmolenko 85'	Report	Samatta (yellow card) 41'; Grealish 84'	Stadium: London Stadium; Attendance: 0 Referee: Michael Oliver
Note: Villa pulled off what Smith described as a "magnificent achievement" to clinch survival on the last day. The match was postponed on 3 April due to concerns over the COVID-19 pandemic. It was rescheduled to 26 July.

== EFL Cup ==
On 13 August 2019, the Second Round of the EFL Cup was drawn by Gary Neville and Paul Robinson at Salford City's Moor Lane stadium. The Third Round draw was held on 28 August 2019 at Lincoln City's Sincil Bank stadium. The Fourth Round draw was held on 25 September 2019 at MK Dons' Stadium MK. The Quarter-Final draw was held on 31 October 2019, by David James and Zoe Ball on BBC Radio 2. The Semi-Final draw was held on 18 December 2019, at Oxford United's Kassam Stadium by Dennis Wise and Chris Kamara.

27 August 2019 Second Round	Crewe Alexandra	1–6	Aston Villa	Crewe
19:45 BST	Lancashire (yellow card) 71'; Wintle 84'	Report	Konsa 4'; Hourihane 24', 45+3'; Lansbury (yellow card) 58'; Davis 69'; Guilbert 76'; Grealish 87'	Stadium: Gresty Road; Attendance: 7,173; Referee: Jarred Gillett

25 September 2019 Third Round	Brighton & Hove Albion	1–3	Aston Villa	Falmer
19:45 BST	Roberts 61', (yellow card) 90+2'; Richards (yellow card) 79'	Report	Jota 22'; Hourihane 33'; Grealish 78'; Konsa (yellow card) 85'	Stadium: Falmer Stadium; Attendance: 14,982; Referee: Graham Scott

30 October 2019 Fourth Round	Aston Villa	2–1	Wolverhampton Wanderers	Aston, Birmingham
19:45 GMT	El Ghazi 28'; Elmohamady 57'; McGinn (yellow card) 84'	Report	Cutrone 54'	Stadium: Villa Park; Attendance: 34,962 (5,326 away); Referee: Lee Mason

17 December 2019 Quarter-final	Aston Villa	5–0	Liverpool	Aston, Birmingham
19:45 GMT	Hourihane 14'; Boyes 17' (o.g.); Kodjia 37', 45'; Wesley 90+2'	Report	Christie-Davies (yellow card) 41'	Stadium: Villa Park; Attendance: 30,323; Referee: Lee Mason

8 January 2020 Semi-final First Leg	Leicester City	1–1	Aston Villa	Leicester
19:45 GMT	Vardy (yellow card) 39'; Iheanacho 74'	Report	Guilbert 28'; El Ghazi (yellow card) 36'; Konsa (yellow card) 74'	Stadium: King Power Stadium; Attendance: 31,280; Referee: Chris Kavanagh

28 January 2020 Semi-final Second Leg	Aston Villa	2–1 (3–2 agg.)	Leicester City	Aston, Birmingham
19:45 GMT	Targett 12'; Konsa (yellow card) 57'; Douglas Luiz (yellow card) 60'; Trézéguet 90+3'	Report	Iheanacho 72'; Söyüncü (yellow card) 76'	Stadium: Villa Park; Attendance: 39,300; Referee: Mike Dean

1 March 2020 Final	Aston Villa	1–2	Manchester City	London
16:30 GMT	Samatta 41'; Elmohamady (yellow card) 68'; Nakamba (yellow card) 72'; Mings (yellow card) 90+3'	Report	Agüero 20'; Rodri 30', (yellow card) 60'; Sterling (yellow card) 57'	Stadium: Wembley Stadium; Attendance: 82,145; Referee: Lee Mason

Results by matchday

Matchday	1	2	3	4	5	6	7	8	9	10	11	12	13	14	15	16	17	18	19	20	21	22	23	24	25	26	27	28	29	30	31	32	33	34	35	36	37	38
Ground	A	H	H	A	H	A	H	A	H	A	H	A	H	A	A	H	A	H	H	A	A	H	A	H	A	H	A	H	A	H	A	H	A	H	H	A	H	A
Result	L	L	W	L	D	L	D	W	W	L	L	L	W	D	L	L	L	L	W	L	W	L	D	W	L	L	L	L	D	L	D	L	L	L	W	D	W	D
Position	15	17	16	18	17	18	18	15	11	15	16	17	15	15	15	17	17	18	18	18	17	18	18	16	17	17	17	19	19	19	19	18	18	19	19	19	17	17

Updated to match(es) played on 26 July 2020. Source: Premier League
A = Away; H = Home; W = Win; D = Draw; L = Loss

== FA Cup ==
On 2 December 2019, the draw was made for the Third Round of the FA Cup at the Etihad Stadium by Tony Adams and former Villa player, Micah Richards.

4 January 2020 Third Round	Fulham	2–1	Aston Villa	Fulham
15:01 GMT	McDonald (yellow card) 47'; Knockaert 54', (yellow card) 88'; Arter 74'; Hector (yellow card) 90+7'	Report	Nakamba (yellow card) 6'; Taylor (yellow card) 21'; El Ghazi 63'; Lansbury (yellow card) 90+6'	Stadium: Craven Cottage; Attendance: 12,980; Referee: Craig Pawson

== Squad statistics ==
=== Appearances and goals ===
No.	Pos	Nat	Player	Total		Premier League		FA Cup		League Cup		Other	
No.	Pos	Nat	Player	Apps	Goals	Apps	Goals	Apps	Goals	Apps	Goals	Apps	Goals
Goalkeepers
1	GK	(England) ENG	Tom Heaton	20	0	20	0	0	0	0	0	0	0
12	GK	(England) ENG	Jed Steer	4	0	1	0	0	0	3	0	0	0
25	GK	(Norway) NOR	Ørjan Nyland	12	0	5+2	0	1	0	4	0	0	0
29	GK	(Spain) ESP	Pepe Reina	12	0	12	0	0	0	0	0	0	0
31	GK	(Montenegro) MNE	Matija Sarkic	0	0	0	0	0	0	0	0	0	0
Defenders
3	DF	(Wales) WAL	Neil Taylor	18	0	11+3	0	1	0	3	0	0	0
15	DF	(England) ENG	Ezri Konsa	31	2	24+1	1	0	0	6	1	0	0
18	DF	(England) ENG	Matt Targett	32	2	27+1	1	0	0	4	1	0	0
22	DF	(Belgium) BEL	Björn Engels	19	1	15+2	1	1	0	1	0	0	0
24	DF	(France) FRA	Frédéric Guilbert	29	2	22+3	0	0	0	3+1	2	0	0
27	DF	(Egypt) EGY	Ahmed Elmohamady	25	2	11+7	1	1	0	5+1	1	0	0
30	DF	(England) ENG	Kortney Hause	24	1	17+1	1	0	0	5+1	0	0	0
40	DF	(England) ENG	Tyrone Mings	36	2	33	2	0	0	3	0	0	0
Midfielders
4	MF	(England) ENG	Danny Drinkwater	4	0	4	0	0	0	0	0	0	0
6	MF	(Brazil) BRA	Douglas Luiz	42	3	28+8	3	0	0	6	0	0	0
7	MF	(Scotland) SCO	John McGinn	30	3	27+1	3	0	0	1+1	0	0	0
8	MF	(England) ENG	Henri Lansbury	15	0	2+8	0	1	0	3+1	0	0	0
10	MF	(England) ENG	Jack Grealish	41	10	36	8	0	0	3+2	2	0	0
11	MF	(Zimbabwe) ZIM	Marvelous Nakamba	34	0	19+10	0	1	0	4	0	0	0
14	MF	(Republic of Ireland) IRL	Conor Hourihane	34	7	18+9	3	1	0	4+2	4	0	0
17	MF	(Egypt) EGY	Trézéguet	41	7	20+14	6	0+1	0	4+2	1	0	0
21	MF	(Netherlands) NED	Anwar El Ghazi	40	6	26+8	4	1	1	5	1	0	0
23	MF	(Spain) ESP	Jota	14	1	4+6	0	1	0	3	1	0	0
Forwards
9	FW	(Brazil) BRA	Wesley	22	6	21	5	0	0	0+1	1	0	0
19	FW	(Spain) ESP	Borja Bastón	2	0	0+2	0	0	0	0	0	0	0
20	FW	(Tanzania) TAN	Mbwana Samatta	16	2	11+3	1	0	0	2	1	0	0
36	FW	(United States) USA	Indiana Vassilev	6	0	0+4	0	0+1	0	0+1	0	0	0
39	FW	(England) ENG	Keinan Davis	23	1	4+14	0	0	0	3+2	1	0	0
51	FW	(England) ENG	Cameron Archer	1	0	0	0	0	0	0+1	0	0	0
Players transferred or loaned out during the season
5	DF	(Wales) WAL	James Chester	2	0	0	0	1	0	1	0	0	0
26	FW	(Ivory Coast) CIV	Jonathan Kodjia	9	2	0+6	0	1	0	1+1	2	0	0
28	GK	(Croatia) CRO	Lovre Kalinić	0	0	0	0	0	0	0	0	0	0
41	MF	(England) ENG	Jacob Ramsey	2	0	0	0	0+1	0	0+1	0	0	0

Disciplinary Records
Player	Position	Premier League		EFL Cup		FA Cup		Other		Total	
Player	Position	Y	R	Y	R	Y	R	Y	R	Y	R
(Brazil) Douglas Luiz	CDM	8	0	1	0	0	0	0	0	9	0
(England) Jack Grealish	CAM	8	0	0	0	0	0	0	0	8	0
(England) Tyrone Mings	CB	7	0	1	0	0	0	0	0	8	0
(France) Frédéric Guilbert	RB	7	0	0	0	0	0	0	0	7	0
(Zimbabwe) Marvelous Nakamba	CDM	5	0	1	0	1	0	0	0	7	0
(England) Ezri Konsa	CB	3	0	3	0	0	0	0	0	6	0
(Egypt) Trézéguet	LW	4	1	0	0	0	0	0	0	4	1
(Netherlands) Anwar El Ghazi	RW	3	0	1	0	0	0	0	0	4	0
(Republic of Ireland) Conor Hourihane	CM	4	0	0	0	0	0	0	0	4	0
(Scotland) John McGinn	CM	3	0	1	0	0	0	0	0	4	0
(England) Matt Targett	LB	4	0	0	0	0	0	0	0	4	0
(England) Kortney Hause	CB	3	0	0	0	0	0	0	0	3	0
(Wales) Neil Taylor	LB	2	0	0	0	1	0	0	0	3	0
(Brazil) Wesley	CF	3	0	0	0	0	0	0	0	3	0
(Egypt) Ahmed Elmohamady	RB	1	0	1	0	0	0	0	0	2	0
(England) Henri Lansbury	CM	0	0	1	0	1	0	0	0	2	0
(Belgium) Björn Engels	CB	1	0	0	0	0	0	0	0	1	0
(England) Danny Drinkwater	CDM	1	0	0	0	0	0	0	0	1	0
(Ivory Coast) Jonathan Kodjia	CF	1	0	0	0	0	0	0	0	1	0
(Tanzania) Mbwana Samatta	CF	1	0	0	0	0	0	0	0	1	0
(Spain) Pepe Reina	GK	1	0	0	0	0	0	0	0	1	0
TOTAL		70	1	10	0	3	0	0	0	83	1

Based on matches played until 26 July 2020

Top Scorers
Player	Position	Premier League		EFL Cup		FA Cup		Other		Total	
		Goals	Assists	Goals	Assists	Goals	Assists	Goals	Assists	Goals	Assists
(England) Jack Grealish	CM	8	6	2	2	0	0	0	0	10	8
(Republic of Ireland) Conor Hourihane	CM	3	5	4	0	0	0	0	0	7	5
(Egypt) Trézéguet	LW	6	1	1	1	0	0	0	0	7	2
(Netherlands) Anwar El Ghazi	LW	4	4	1	3	1	0	0	0	6	7
(Brazil) Wesley	CF	5	1	1	0	0	0	0	0	6	1
(Scotland) John McGinn	CM	3	3	0	0	0	0	0	0	3	3
(Brazil) Douglas Luiz	CM	3	2	0	0	0	0	0	0	3	2
(Egypt) Ahmed Elmohamady	RB	1	1	1	2	0	0	0	0	2	3
(England) Ezri Konsa	CB	1	2	1	0	0	0	0	0	2	2
(France) Frédéric Guilbert	RB	0	2	2	0	0	0	0	0	2	2
(England) Matt Targett	LB	1	2	1	0	0	0	0	0	2	2
(England) Tyrone Mings	CB	2	2	0	0	0	0	0	0	2	2
(Ivory Coast) Jonathan Kodjia	CF	0	0	2	0	0	1	0	0	2	1
(Tanzania) Mbwana Samatta	CF	1	0	1	0	0	0	0	0	2	0
Own goal	N/A	1	0	1	0	0	0	0	0	2	0
(Spain) Jota	RW	0	1	1	1	0	0	0	0	1	2
(England) Keinan Davis	CF	0	0	1	1	0	0	0	0	1	1
(Belgium) Björn Engels	CB	1	0	0	0	0	0	0	0	1	0
(England) Kortney Hause	CB	1	0	0	0	0	0	0	0	1	0
(England) Henri Lansbury	CM	0	0	0	5	0	0	0	0	0	5
TOTAL		41	32	20	15	1	1	0	0	62	48

Based on matches played until 26 July 2020

=== Transfers ===
Transfers in

Date from	Position	Nationality	Name	From	Fee	Ref.
5 June 2019	RW	(Spain)	Jota	(England) Birmingham City	Undisclosed	
10 June 2019	LW	(Netherlands)	Anwar El Ghazi	(France) Lille	Undisclosed	
13 June 2019	CF	(Brazil)	Wesley	(Belgium) Club Brugge	£22,000,000	
17 June 2019	CB	(England)	Kortney Hause	(England) Wolverhampton Wanderers	£3,000,000	
1 July 2019	LB	(England)	Matt Targett	(England) Southampton	£11,500,000	
8 July 2019	CB	(England)	Tyrone Mings	(England) Bournemouth	£20,000,000	
11 July 2019	CB	(England)	Ezri Konsa	(England) Brentford	£12,000,000	
16 July 2019	CB	(Belgium)	Björn Engels	(France) Reims	£9,000,000	
24 July 2019	LW	(Egypt)	Trézéguet	(Turkey) Kasımpaşa	£8,750,000	
25 July 2019	DM	(Brazil)	Douglas Luiz	(England) Manchester City	£15,000,000	
1 August 2019	GK	(England)	Tom Heaton	(England) Burnley	£8,000,000	
1 August 2019	DM	(Zimbabwe)	Marvelous Nakamba	(Belgium) Club Brugge	£10,200,000	
20 January 2020	CF	(Tanzania)	Mbwana Samatta	(Belgium) Genk	£8,500,000	
23 January 2020	CF	(England)	Louie Barry	(Spain) Barcelona	£880,000	
31 January 2020	CF	(Spain)	Borja Bastón	(Wales) Swansea City	Free Transfer	

Transfers out

Date from	Position	Nationality	Name	To	Fee	Ref.
5 June 2019	CM	(England)	Gary Gardner	(England) Birmingham City	Undisclosed	
1 July 2019	RW	(Ghana)	Albert Adomah	(England) Nottingham Forest	Free Transfer	
1 July 2019	RW	(England)	Corey Blackett-Taylor	(England) Tranmere Rovers	Free transfer	
1 July 2019	GK	(England)	Mark Bunn	Retired	Released	
1 July 2019	RB	(Wales)	Mitch Clark	(England) Leicester City	Released	
1 July 2019	RB	(Belgium)	Ritchie De Laet	(Belgium) Antwerp	Free transfer	
1 July 2019	CB	(England)	Tommy Elphick	(England) Huddersfield Town	Free transfer	
1 July 2019	RB	(Scotland)	Alan Hutton	Free agent	Released	
1 July 2019	DM	(Australia)	Mile Jedinak	Free agent	Released	
1 July 2019	CF	(England)	Harvey Knibbs	(England) Cambridge United	Free transfer	
1 July 2019	GK	(England)	Sam Lomax	(England) Stratford Town	Free transfer	
1 July 2019	DM	(Australia)	Jordan Lyden	(England) Swindon Town	Released	
1 July 2019	SS	(Scotland)	Ross McCormack	Free agent	Released	
1 July 2019	CF	(England)	Harry McKirdy	(England) Carlisle United	Free transfer	
1 July 2019	CM	(England)	Alexander Prosser	(England) Kidderminster Harriers	Free transfer	
1 July 2019	RB	(England)	Micah Richards	Retired	Released	
1 July 2019	DM	(Republic of Ireland)	Glenn Whelan	(Scotland) Heart of Midlothian	Released	
3 July 2019	CB	(England)	Luke Ige	(England) Colchester United	Free transfer	
8 August 2019	CM	(Iceland)	Birkir Bjarnason	Free agent	Mutual consent	
29 August 2019	CM	(Democratic Republic of the Congo)	Aaron Tshibola	(Belgium) Waasland Beveren	Undisclosed	
19 January 2020	CF	(Ivory Coast)	Jonathan Kodjia	(Qatar) Al-Gharafa	Undisclosed	
21 January 2020	CB	(England)	Easah Suliman	(Portugal) Vitória de Guimarães	Undisclosed	
29 January 2020	CF	(Scotland)	Aaron Pressley	(England) Brentford	Undisclosed	

Loans in

Date from	Position	Nationality	Name	From	Until	Ref.
7 January 2020	CM	(England)	Danny Drinkwater	(England) Chelsea	30 June 2020	
13 January 2020	GK	(Spain)	Pepe Reina	(Italy) Milan	30 June 2020	

Loans out

Date from	Position	Nationality	Name	To	Until	Ref.
26 June 2019	GK	(Montenegro)	Matija Sarkic	(Scotland) Livingston	3 January 2020	
1 August 2019	CM	(Republic of Ireland)	Jake Doyle-Hayes	(England) Cheltenham Town	30 June 2020	
1 August 2019	LW	(England)	Andre Green	(England) Preston North End	31 December 2019	
2 August 2019	CF	(England)	Rushian Hepburn-Murphy	(England) Tranmere Rovers	31 January 2020	
7 August 2019	CF	(Republic of Ireland)	Scott Hogan	(England) Stoke City	29 January 2020	
8 August 2019	RB	(England)	James Bree	(England) Luton Town	30 June 2020	
22 August 2019	AM	(England)	Callum O'Hare	(England) Coventry City	30 June 2020	
2 January 2020	LW	(England)	Andre Green	(England) Charlton Athletic	30 June 2020	
20 January 2020	GK	(Croatia)	Lovre Kalinić	(France) Toulouse	30 June 2020	
22 January 2020	CB	(England)	Jake Walker	(England) Banbury United	30 June 2020	
24 January 2020	CM	(England)	Lewis Brunt	(England) Gloucester City	30 June 2020	
29 January 2020	CF	(Republic of Ireland)	Scott Hogan	(England) Birmingham City	30 June 2020	
31 January 2020	CB	(Wales)	James Chester	(England) Stoke City	30 June 2020	
31 January 2020	CF	(England)	Rushian Hepburn-Murphy	(England) Derby County	30 June 2020	
31 January 2020	CM	(England)	Jacob Ramsey	(England) Doncaster Rovers	30 June 2020	
31 January 2020	AM	(England)	Ben Guy	(England) Belper Town	30 June 2020	
