= Arnaut Danjuma =

Netherlands international footballer (born 1997)

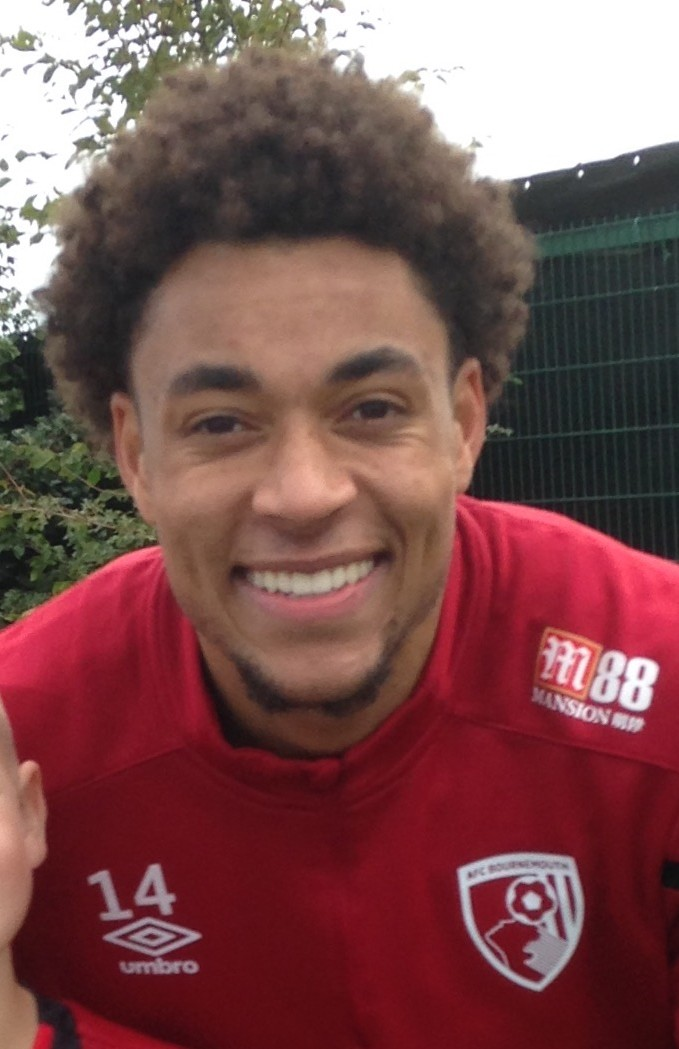
- Danjuma with AFC Bournemouth in 2019

Personal information
- Full name: Arnaut Danjuma Groeneveld
- Date of birth: 31 January 1997 (age 29)
- Place of birth: Lagos, Nigeria
- Height: 1.78 m (5 ft 10 in)
- Positions: Left winger; forward

Team information
- Current team: Valencia
- Number: 7

Youth career
- 2008: TOP Oss
- 2008–2016: PSV
- 2016–2017: NEC

Senior career*
Years	Team	Apps	(Gls)
2015	Jong PSV	1	(0)
2016–2018	NEC	40	(12)
2018–2019	Club Brugge	21	(5)
2019–2021	AFC Bournemouth	47	(15)
2021–2025	Villarreal	36	(14)
2023	→ Tottenham Hotspur (loan)	9	(1)
2023–2024	→ Everton (loan)	14	(1)
2024–2025	→ Girona (loan)	25	(2)
2025–	Valencia	42	(3)

International career
2018	Netherlands U21	4	(2)
2018–2022	Netherlands	6	(2)
- * Club domestic league appearances and goals as of 23:37, 15 November 2026 (UTC)

Arnaut Danjuma Groeneveld (born 31 January 1997) is a professional footballer who plays as a left winger for La Liga club Valencia. Born in Nigeria, he has represented the Netherlands national team.

After making one substitute appearance for Jong PSV in the Eerste Divisie, he played for NEC in the Eredivisie and Eerste Divisie, Club Brugge in the Belgian Pro League and AFC Bournemouth in the Premier League and EFL Championship. He signed for Villarreal for an estimated €25 million in 2021.

Born in Nigeria and raised mainly in the Netherlands, Danjuma earned his first cap for the Netherlands national team in October 2018. He was recalled to the team three years later.

== Club career ==
=== Early career ===
Danjuma was born in Lagos, Nigeria to a Dutch father and a Nigerian mother. After his parents' divorce, he was briefly homeless and spent time in foster care. He joined PSV in 2008 from TOP Oss; he made his professional debut for Jong PSV in the Eerste Divisie on 7 December 2015 against NAC, replacing Moussa Sanoh after 65 minutes of a 3–0 home loss.

In the summer of 2016, Danjuma signed for NEC where he was expected to play for the second team. On 10 September, he made his debut and first Eredivisie appearance against his former club PSV; he was an 85th-minute substitute for Reagy Ofosu in a 4–0 home loss. In 16 appearances in his first season, he scored once to open a 2–0 win at Heerenveen on the final day of the season; the team were relegated through the playoffs.

=== Club Brugge ===
In July 2018, Danjuma signed for Club Brugge. He made his debut on 22 July in the 2018 Belgian Super Cup, helping his team to a 2–1 win over Standard Liège. On 3 October, he scored a goal against Atlético Madrid in a 3–1 loss in the Champions League group stage. In his only full season in the Belgian First Division A, he scored five goals, starting with two in a 3–0 home win over Kortrijk on 10 August.

=== AFC Bournemouth ===
On 1 August 2019, Danjuma joined Premier League club AFC Bournemouth for a fee of £13.7 million, signing a long-term contract. He made his debut against Burton Albion in the third round of the EFL Cup on 25 September, as a 61st-minute substitute for Dominic Solanke in a 2–0 away loss; his first goal was in a 3–2 win against Blackburn Rovers on 12 September 2020.

After ten goal contributions in a month, Danjuma was awarded the Championship Player of the Month award for April 2021. He was awarded the Bournemouth Player of the Year award after receiving 40% of the supporters' vote, narrowly beating Asmir Begović who had 38% of the vote.

=== Villarreal ===
On 19 August 2021, Danjuma joined La Liga club Villarreal for a fee believed to be in the region of €25 million, signing a contract until June 2026. He scored his first goal for the club in a 1–1 draw with reigning league champions Atlético Madrid on 29 August, and his first UEFA Champions League goal in a 2–2 draw against Atalanta on 14 September. On 19 February 2022, he scored a hat-trick in a 4–1 league victory over Granada; two months later he contributed both goals of a home win against regional rivals Valencia.

Danjuma scored six Champions League goals in his first season at Villarreal. His brace in a 3–2 win at Atalanta on 9 December put the team into the last 16 as group runners-up. On 6 April 2022, he scored the only goal against Bayern Munich at the Estadio de la Cerámica in the quarter-finals first leg; he missed the second leg of the semi-final elimination by Liverpool through a muscle injury.

==== Loan to Tottenham Hotspur ====
During January 2023, Danjuma was set to return to England to join Everton, before Tottenham Hotspur hijacked the deal. On 25 January 2023, he joined Tottenham on loan until the end of the season. Three days later Danjuma was added to the squad as a substitute for the FA Cup game. He came off the bench marking his debut and scored a goal in the 3–0 victory away against Preston North End. He scored his first Premier League goal on 15 April 2023 in a 3–2 home defeat by Bournemouth. Tottenham confirmed the end of Danjuma's loan spell on 15 June 2023.

==== Loan to Everton ====
On 23 July 2023, Danjuma joined Everton on a season-long loan from Villarreal, taking the number 10 shirt. He made his first appearance against Stoke City in a pre-season friendly on 29 July, playing 45 minutes before being substituted in sigame a 1–0 away win. Danjuma made his debut in a 1–0 league defeat against Fulham at Goodison Park.

==== Loan to Girona ====
On 30 August 2024, Danjuma was loaned to fellow La Liga club Girona on a season-long loan.

=== Valencia ===
On 10 August 2025, Danjuma joined Valencia on a three-year deal.

== International career ==
Danjuma was born in Nigeria to a Dutch father and Nigerian mother, and was eligible for either national team. He was first called up for the Netherlands national team by Ronald Koeman in October 2018. He made his debut on 13 October in a 3–0 UEFA Nations League home win over Germany, as a 68th-minute substitute for former Jong PSV teammate Steven Bergwijn. Three days later, he scored his first international goal to equalise in a 1–1 friendly draw away to neighbours Belgium.

After nearly three years without a cap, Danjuma returned to the squad as a replacement for Cody Gakpo. On 11 October 2021 in a 2022 FIFA World Cup qualifier at home to Gibraltar, he came off the bench and scored in a 6–0 win. Louis van Gaal did not call him up for the final tournament in Qatar.

== Personal life ==
Arnaut and Danjuma are the player's first names, with him describing the latter as his Nigerian name; he also uses Adam as his Islamic name. He was raised Muslim but stated that he did not become a practising Muslim until he was an adult; he celebrates goals by saying the Tahmid.

== Career statistics ==
=== Club ===
As of match played 10 October 2026

Appearances and goals by club, season and competition
Club	Season	League			National cup (Note: Includes KNVB Cup, Belgian Cup, FA Cup, Copa del Rey)		League cup (Note: Includes EFL Cup)		Europe		Other		Total	
Club	Season	Division	Apps	Goals	Apps	Goals	Apps	Goals	Apps	Goals	Apps	Goals	Apps	Goals
Jong PSV	2015–16	Eerste Divisie	1	0	—		—		—		—		1	0
NEC	2016–17	Eredivisie	12	1	0	0	—		—		4 (Note: Appearances in Eredivisie relegation play-offs)	0	16	1
NEC	2017–18	Eerste Divisie	28	11	2	2	—		—		0	0	30	13
NEC	Total		40	12	2	2	—		—		4	0	46	14
Club Brugge	2018–19	Belgian Pro League	20	5	1	0	—		2 (Note: Appearance(s) in UEFA Champions League)	1	1 (Note: Appearance in Belgian Super Cup)	0	24	6
Club Brugge	2019–20	Belgian Pro League	1	0	0	0	—		0	0	—		1	0
Club Brugge	Total		21	5	1	0	—		2	1	1	0	25	6
AFC Bournemouth	2019–20	Premier League	14	0	0	0	1	0	—		—		15	0
AFC Bournemouth	2020–21	Championship	33	15	2	0	0	0	—		2 (Note: Appearances in Championship play-offs)	2	37	17
AFC Bournemouth	Total		47	15	2	0	1	0	—		2	2	52	17
Villarreal	2021–22	La Liga	23	10	0	0	—		11	6	—		34	16
Villarreal	2022–23	La Liga	10	2	2	2	—		5 (Note: Appearances in UEFA Europa Conference League)	2	—		17	6
Villarreal	2024–25	La Liga	3	2	—		—		—		—		3	2
Villarreal	Total		36	14	2	2	—		16	8	0	0	54	24
Tottenham Hotspur (loan)	2022–23	Premier League	9	1	2	1	—		1	0	—		12	2
Everton (loan)	2023–24	Premier League	14	1	2	0	4	1	—		—		20	2
Girona (loan)	2024–25	La Liga	25	2	2	0	—		7	1	—		34	3
Valencia	2025–26	La Liga	30	3	4	1	—		—		—		34	4
Valencia	2026–27	La Liga	12	0	1	0	—		—		—		13	0
Valencia	Total		42	3	5	1	—		—		—		47	4
Career total			235	52	18	6	5	1	26	10	7	2	291	71

=== International ===
As of match played 26 March 2022

Appearances and goals by national team and year
National team	Year	Apps	Goals
Netherlands	2018	2	1
Netherlands	2021	3	1
Netherlands	2022	1	0
Total		6	2

As of match played 11 October 2021. Netherlands score listed first, score column indicates score after each Danjuma goal.

List of international goals scored by Arnaut Danjuma
No.	Date	Venue	Cap	Opponent	Score	Result	Competition
1	16 October 2018	King Baudouin Stadium, Brussels, Belgium	2	Belgium	1–1	1–1	Friendly
2	11 October 2021	De Kuip, Rotterdam, Netherlands	3	Gibraltar	5–0	6–0	2022 FIFA World Cup qualification

== Honours ==
Club Brugge

- Belgian Super Cup: 2018

Individual

- EFL Championship Player of the Month: April 2021
- AFC Bournemouth Player of the Year: 2020–21
- EFL Championship Team of the Season: 2020–21
