= 2018 Belgian Super Cup =

Club Brugge	Standard Liège
League winners	Cup winners
2	1
- Date: 22 July 2018
- Venue: Jan Breydel Stadium, Bruges
- Man of the Match: Hans Vanaken (Club Brugge)
- Referee: Bart Vertenten
- Attendance: 16,000
- Weather: Sunny

The 2018 Belgian Super Cup was a football match that took place on 22 July 2018, between the 2017–18 Belgian First Division A winners Club Brugge and Standard Liège, the winners of the 2017–18 Belgian Cup. Club Brugge won the match 2–1. For Club Brugge, the victory meant a record 15th Super Cup. Standard Liège featured for the ninth time. The match was a repetition of the 2016 Belgian Super Cup, when Club Brugge also beat Standard 2–1.

== Match ==
=== Details ===
22 July 2018
20:00 CEST

Club Brugge	2–1	Standard Liège
Vanaken 39'; Wesley 43'	Report	Edmilson 49'

Jan Breydelstadion, Bruges
Attendance: 16,000
Referee: Bart Vertenten

Club Brugge	Standard Liège

GK	1	(Croatia) Karlo Letica
RB	35	(Switzerland) Saulo Decarli
CB	15	(Croatia) Matej Mitrović
CB	24	(Netherlands) Stefano Denswil
LB	11	(Senegal) Krépin Diatta
CM	25	(Netherlands) Ruud Vormer (c)
CM	26	(Belgium) Mats Rits
AM	20	(Belgium) Hans Vanaken
RW	47	(Netherlands) Arnaut Danjuma
CF	9	(Belgium) Jelle Vossen
LW	7	(Brazil) Wesley
Substitutes:
GK	22	(United States) Ethan Horvath
CB	2	(Denmark) Alexander Scholz
CB	4	(Brazil) Luan Peres
CB	5	(France) Benoît Poulain
CB	14	(Croatia) Ivan Tomečak
MF	16	(Belgium) Siebe Schrijvers
CB	21	(Belgium) Dion Cools
FW	80	(Belgium) Loïs Openda
MF	98	(Belgium) Brandon Baiye
Manager:
(Croatia) Ivan Leko

GK	1	(Belgium) Jean-François Gillet
RB	29	(Belgium) Luis Pedro Cavanda
CB	26	(Democratic Republic of the Congo) Christian Luyindama
DF	34	(Cyprus) Constantinos Laifis
LB	15	(Belgium) Sébastien Pocognoli (c)
CM	5	(Nigeria) Uche Henry Agbo
CM	28	(Belgium) Samuel Bastien
AM	18	(Romania) Răzvan Marin
RW	40	(Democratic Republic of the Congo) Paul-José M'Poku
CF	7	(Croatia) Duje Čop
LW	22	(Belgium) Edmilson
Substitutes:
GK	16	(Belgium) Arnaud Bodart
DF	3	(Belgium) Zinho Vanheusden
DF	6	(Serbia) Miloš Kosanović
FW	9	(Belgium) Renaud Emond
MF	11	(Brazil) Carlinhos
MF	19	(Mali) Moussa Djenepo
DF	21	(Cameroon) Collins Fai
Manager:
(Belgium) Michel Preud'homme

Match rules

- 90 minutes.
- Penalty shoot-out if scores level.
- Seven named substitutes.
- Maximum of three substitutions.

== See also ==
- 2018–19 Belgian First Division A
- 2018–19 Belgian Cup
