= Karlo Letica =

Croatian footballer (born 1997)

Personal information
- Date of birth: 11 February 1997 (age 29)
- Place of birth: Split, Croatia
- Height: 2.01 m (6 ft 7 in)
- Position: Goalkeeper

Team information
- Current team: FC Luzern
- Number: 30

Youth career
- 2005–2008: Omiš
- 2008–2014: Hajduk Split

Senior career*
Years	Team	Apps	(Gls)
2015–2018	Hajduk Split	19	(1)
2015	→ Mosor (loan)	16	(0)
2015	→ Val (loan)	13	(0)
2016	→ Rudeš (loan)	18	(0)
2018–2021	Club Brugge	12	(0)
2019–2020	→ SPAL (loan)	10	(0)
2020–2021	→ Sampdoria (loan)	1	(0)
2021–2022	CFR Cluj	4	(0)
2022–2023	Hermannstadt	30	(0)
2023–2026	Lausanne-Sport	103	(0)
2026–	Luzern	10	(0)

International career
2015–2016	Croatia U19	14	(0)
2017–2018	Croatia U21	1	(0)
- * Club domestic league appearances and goals as of 7 November 2026

Karlo Letica (Croatian pronunciation: [kâːrlo lětitsa]; born 11 February 1997) is a Croatian professional footballer who plays as a goalkeeper for Swiss Super League side FC Luzern.

== Club career ==
=== Hajduk Split and lower division loans ===
Letica kicked off his career with Hajduk Split in 2015 after arriving to the academy in 2008. He spent the initial years in loan spells. His first loan spell came in February 2015, when he joined Mosor of the third tier along with five other Hajduk players. His second loan spell was to NK Val of the same tier. In August 2016, he was loaned off again, this time to second tier club Rudeš where he made his debut in the Croatian Football Cup qualifiers.

In August 2017, Letica made his debut for Hajduk when he featured in a 1–0 league victory against Slaven Belupo where he kept a clean sheet. On 11 March 2018, Letica scored his first professional goal in additional time against Istra 1961 for a 3–2 victory. During that time, he was linked with Real Madrid.

=== Club Brugge and loans ===
On 15 June 2018, Letica moved abroad and signed a four-year contract with Belgian club Club Brugge.

On 20 August 2019, Letica joined Italian Serie A club SPAL on loan with an option to buy.

On 5 October 2020, Letica joined Italian Serie A club Sampdoria on loan with an option to buy.

=== CFR Cluj ===
On 11 October 2021, he moved to Romania to sign with defending Liga I champions CFR Cluj.

=== Hermannstadt ===
On 12 October 2022, Letica joined Romanian Liga I club Hermannstadt agreeing to a one-year deal, with an option to extend for a further year.

=== Lausanne-Sport ===
Letica joined Swiss Super League side Lausanne-Sport on 24 August 2023, signing through June 2026. He established himself as the club's first-choice goalkeeper, amassing 66 league appearances by 15 June 2025.

During his time at Lausanne-Sport, Letica's performances between the posts earned him the title of Swiss Super League Goalkeeper of the Year for both the 2023–24 and 2024–25 seasons.

=== FC Luzern ===
After not renewing his contract with Lausanne-Sport, Letica moved to league rivals FC Luzern in August 2026, signing a contract until summer 2028.

== International career ==
Letica was a part of the Croatia U19 team that played in 2016 UEFA European Under-19 Championship. In August 2017, he was called to the Croatia U21 for matches against Moldova and Austria. He made his debut against Austria which ended in a 1–1 draw.

In May 2018 he was named in the Croatia national team's preliminary 32-man squad for the 2018 World Cup in Russia, but did not make the final 23.

In June 2025, Letica was again included in the senior national team squad for a UEFA Euro 2025 qualifier against Gibraltar.

== Career statistics ==
As of match played 10 February 2026

Appearances and goals by club, season and competition
Club	Season	League			National cup (Note: Includes Croatian Cup, Coppa Italia, Cupa României, Swiss Cup)		Continental		Other		Total	
Club	Season	Division	Apps	Goals	Apps	Goals	Apps	Goals	Apps	Goals	Apps	Goals
Rudeš (loan)	2016–17	Druga HNL	18	0	2	0	—		—		20	0
Hajduk Split	2017–18	Prva HNL	19	1	3	0	0	0	—		22	1
Club Brugge	2018–19	Belgian First Division A	12	0	0	0	3 (Note: Appearances in UEFA Champions League)	0	1 (Note: Appearance in Belgian Supercup)	0	16	0
SPAL (loan)	2019–20	Serie A	10	0	0	0	—		—		10	0
Sampdoria (loan)	2020–21	Serie A	1	0	1	0	—		—		2	0
CFR Cluj	2021–22	Liga I	4	0	0	0	—		—		4	0
Hermannstadt	2022–23	Liga I	25	0	2	0	—		—		27	0
Hermannstadt	2023–24	Liga I	5	0	0	0	—		—		5	0
Hermannstadt	Total		30	0	2	0	—		0	0	32	0
Lausanne-Sport	2023–24	Swiss Super League	32	0	2	0	—		—		34	0
Lausanne-Sport	2024-25	Swiss Super League	34	0	2	0	—		—		36	0
Lausanne-Sport	2025-26	Swiss Super League	22	0	2	0	12	0	—		36	0
Lausanne-Sport	Total		88	0	6	0	12	0	—		106	0
Career total			182	1	14	0	15	0	1	0	212	1

== Honours ==
Club Brugge

- Belgian Super Cup: 2018

CFR Cluj

- Liga I: 2021–22
