= 2016–17 Club Brugge KV season =

Club Brugge
2016–17 season
- President: Bart Verhaeghe
- Manager: Michel Preud'homme
- Stadium: Jan Breydel Stadium
- Belgian First Division A: 2nd
- Belgian Cup: Seventh Round
- Belgian Super Cup: Winners
- UEFA Champions League: Group stage
- Top goalscorer: League: Ruud Vormer (7)
- Average home league attendance: 27,313
- Biggest win: 6–1 v Mechelen (Home, 25 November 2016, Belgian First Division A); 5–0 v Zulte Waregem (Home, 24 February 2017, Belgian First Division A)
- Biggest defeat: 0–4 v Copenhagen (Away, 27 September 2016, UEFA Champions League)
| Home colours | Away colours | Third colours |

The 2016–17 season was Club Brugge Koninklijke Voetbalvereniging's 58th consecutive season in the Belgian First Division A and 112th season in existence as a football club. In addition to the domestic league, Club Brugge participated in the Belgian Cup, the Belgian Super Cup and the UEFA Champions League.

== Squad ==
Squad at end of season

Note: Flags indicate national team as defined under FIFA eligibility rules; some limited exceptions apply. Players may hold more than one non-FIFA nationality.

| No. | Pos. | Nation | Player |
|---|---|---|---|
| 1 | GK | FRA | Ludovic Butelle |
| 2 | DF | NED | Ricardo van Rhijn |
| 3 | MF | BEL | Timmy Simons |
| 4 | DF | BEL | Björn Engels |
| 5 | DF | FRA | Benoît Poulain |
| 6 | MF | BRA | Claudemir |
| 7 | FW | BRA | Wesley |
| 8 | FW | ISR | Lior Refaelov |
| 9 | FW | BEL | Jelle Vossen |
| 10 | FW | MLI | Abdoulay Diaby |
| 11 | FW | COL | José Izquierdo |
| 13 | DF | COL | Helibelton Palacios |

| No. | Pos. | Nation | Player |
|---|---|---|---|
| 15 | MF | ESP | Tomás Pina |
| 17 | FW | BEL | Anthony Limbombe |
| 20 | MF | BEL | Hans Vanaken |
| 21 | DF | BEL | Dion Cools |
| 22 | GK | USA | Ethan Horvath |
| 24 | DF | NED | Stefano Denswil |
| 25 | MF | NED | Ruud Vormer |
| 27 | MF | NED | Lex Immers |
| 28 | DF | BEL | Laurens De Bock |
| 29 | FW | ROU | Dorin Rotariu |
| 41 | GK | BEL | Jens Teunckens |

== Competitions ==
=== Overview ===
| Competition | First match | Last match | Starting round | Final position | Record | | | | | | | |
| Competition | First match | Last match | Starting round | Final position | Pld | W | D | L | GF | GA | GD | Win % |
|---|---|---|---|---|---|---|---|---|---|---|---|---|
| Belgian First Division A | 29 July 2016 | 21 May 2017 | Matchday 1 | 2nd | 40 | 22 | 8 | 10 | 72 | 38 | +34 | 55.00 |
| Belgian Cup | 20 September 2016 | 29 November 2016 | Sixth Round | Seventh Round | 2 | 1 | 0 | 1 | 5 | 4 | +1 | 50.00 |
| Belgian Super Cup | 23 July 2016 | | Final | Winners | 1 | 1 | 0 | 0 | 2 | 1 | +1 | 100.00 |
| UEFA Champions League | 14 September 2016 | 7 December 2016 | Group stage | Group stage | 6 | 0 | 0 | 6 | 2 | 14 | −12 | 0.00 |
| Total | | | | | 49 | 24 | 8 | 17 | 81 | 57 | +24 | 48.98 |

Source: Competitions

=== Belgian First Division A ===
==== Regular season ====
===== League table =====
| Pos | Team | Pld | W | D | L | GF | GA | GD | Pts | Qualification or relegation |
|---|---|---|---|---|---|---|---|---|---|---|
| 1 | Anderlecht | 30 | 18 | 7 | 5 | 67 | 30 | +37 | 61 | Qualification for the championship play-offs |
| 2 | Club Brugge | 30 | 18 | 5 | 7 | 56 | 24 | +32 | 59 | Qualification for the championship play-offs |
| 3 | Zulte Waregem | 30 | 15 | 9 | 6 | 49 | 38 | +11 | 54 | Qualification for the championship play-offs |
| 4 | Gent | 30 | 14 | 8 | 8 | 45 | 29 | +16 | 50 | Qualification for the championship play-offs |
| 5 | Oostende | 30 | 14 | 8 | 8 | 52 | 37 | +15 | 50 | Qualification for the championship play-offs |

Source: Belgian First Division A (in Dutch), Soccerway
Rules for classification: 1) Points; 2) Matches won; 3) Goal difference; 4) Goals scored; 5) Away goals scored; 6) Away matches won; 7) Play-off.

===== Results summary =====
| Overall | | | | | | | | Home | | | | | | Away | | | | | |
| Pld | W | D | L | GF | GA | GD | Pts | W | D | L | GF | GA | GD | W | D | L | GF | GA | GD |
|---|---|---|---|---|---|---|---|---|---|---|---|---|---|---|---|---|---|---|---|
| 30 | 18 | 5 | 7 | 56 | 24 | +32 | 59 | 12 | 3 | 0 | 39 | 12 | +27 | 6 | 2 | 7 | 17 | 12 | +5 |

Source: Worldfootball

===== Results by round =====
| Round | 1 | 2 | 3 | 4 | 5 | 6 | 7 | 8 | 9 | 10 | 11 | 12 | 13 | 14 | 15 | 16 | 17 | 18 | 19 | 20 | 21 | 22 | 23 | 24 | 25 | 26 | 27 | 28 | 29 | 30 |
|---|---|---|---|---|---|---|---|---|---|---|---|---|---|---|---|---|---|---|---|---|---|---|---|---|---|---|---|---|---|---|
| Ground | A | A | H | A | H | A | H | A | H | A | H | H | A | H | A | H | H | A | H | A | H | A | H | A | H | A | A | H | A | H |
| Result | W | L | W | L | D | L | W | W | W | L | W | W | D | D | W | W | W | D | W | W | W | W | W | L | W | L | W | W | L | D |
| Position | 2 | 5 | 4 | 7 | 9 | 9 | 8 | 6 | 3 | 6 | 4 | 4 | 5 | 4 | 4 | 3 | 2 | 2 | 1 | 1 | 1 | 1 | 1 | 1 | 1 | 2 | 2 | 2 | 2 | 2 |
| Points | 3 | 3 | 6 | 6 | 7 | 7 | 10 | 13 | 16 | 16 | 19 | 22 | 23 | 24 | 27 | 30 | 33 | 34 | 37 | 40 | 43 | 46 | 49 | 49 | 52 | 52 | 55 | 58 | 58 | 59 |

Source: Worldfootball
A = Away; H = Home; W = Win; D = Draw; L = Loss

===== Matches =====
| 29 July 2016 1 | Mechelen | 0–2 | Club Brugge | Mechelen |
| 20:30 CEST (UTC+2) | Paulussen (yellow card) 39'; Cocalić (yellow card) 53'; De Witte (yellow card) 66' | Report | Izquierdo 27'; D. Cools 30'; Vossen (yellow card) 67'; Limbombe (yellow card) 80' | Stadium: AFAS-stadion Achter de Kazerne; Attendance: 15,136; Referee: C. Dierick |

| 5 August 2016 2 | Oostende | 1–0 | Club Brugge | Ostend |
| 20:30 CEST (UTC+2) | Marušić (yellow card) 22'; El Ghanassy 90+1' | Report | Claudemir (yellow card) 80' | Stadium: Versluys Arena; Attendance: 8,432; Referee: J. van de Velde |

| 14 August 2016 3 | Club Brugge | 1–0 | Lokeren | Bruges |
| 18:00 CEST (UTC+2) | Refaelov 22' (pen.); Vossen (yellow card) 90' | Report | De Sutter (yellow card) 26'; Bolbat (yellow card) 61'; Overmeire (yellow card) 90' | Stadium: Jan Breydel Stadium; Attendance: 26,004; Referee: E. Lambrechts |

| 20 August 2016 4 | Kortrijk | 2–1 | Club Brugge | Kortrijk |
| 18:00 CEST (UTC+2) | Saadi 7', 11'; Rolland (yellow card) 40'; Kaminski (yellow card) 86' | Report | Vanaken 33'; Vormer (yellow card) 42'; Engels (yellow card) 43'; Bolingoli (yellow card) 54' | Stadium: Guldensporen Stadion; Attendance: 8,235; Referee: N. Laforge |

| 28 August 2016 5 | Club Brugge | 2–2 | Standard Liège | Bruges |
| 14:30 CEST (UTC+2) | De Bock (yellow card) 15'; Gedoz (yellow card) 43', (goal) 52'; Engels 90+4' | Report | Touré 14'; Hubert (yellow card) 39'; Dossevi (yellow card) 45+2'; Goreux (yellow card) 67'; Edmilson 85' | Stadium: Jan Breydel Stadium; Attendance: 28,000; Referee: B. Vertenten |

| 9 September 2016 6 | Waasland-Beveren | 1–0 | Club Brugge | Beveren |
| 20:30 CEST (UTC+2) | J. Cools (yellow card) 26'; Schrijvers 58', (yellow card) 59'; Camacho (yellow card) 77'; Köteles (yellow card) 83' | Report | | Stadium: Freethiel Stadion; Attendance: 7,073; Referee: S. Delferiere |

| 17 September 2016 7 | Club Brugge | 3–2 | Eupen | Bruges |
| 18:00 CEST (UTC+2) | Vossen 27' (pen.), 81' (pen.); Vormer (yellow card) 31'; Denswil 64'; Butelle (yellow card) 87' | Report | Onyekuru 9', (yellow card) 87'; Sylla (yellow card) 25'; Taulemesse (yellow card) 26'; García 88' (pen.) | Stadium: Jan Breydel Stadium; Attendance: 29,472; Referee: L. Wouters |

| 23 September 2016 8 | Excel Mouscron | 0–3 | Club Brugge | Mouscron |
| 20:30 CEST (UTC+2) | Marković (yellow card) 32' | Report | Izquierdo 19', 54'; Van Rhijn (yellow card) 33'; Vossen 76' | Stadium: Stade Le Canonnier; Attendance: 10,571; Referee: E. Lambrechts |

| 2 October 2016 9 | Club Brugge | 1–0 | Gent | Bruges |
| 14:30 CEST (UTC+2) | Van Rhijn 42'; Denswil (yellow card) 68'; Diaby (yellow card) 89' | Report | Rabiu (yellow card) 84'; Gershon (red card) 86' | Stadium: Jan Breydel Stadium; Attendance: 27,814; Referee: A. Boucaut |

| 14 October 2016 10 | Charleroi | 1–0 | Club Brugge | Charleroi |
| 20:30 CEST (UTC+2) | Bedia 90' | Report | Claudemir (yellow card) 56'; Simons (yellow card) 56' | Stadium: Stade du Pays de Charleroi; Attendance: 11,616; Referee: J. van de Velde |

| 23 October 2016 11 | Club Brugge | 2–1 | Anderlecht | Bruges |
| 14:30 CEST (UTC+2) | Vanaken 9'; D. Cools (yellow card) 32'; Vormer 47'; Vossen (yellow card) 64'; Claudemir (yellow card) 71'; Wesley (red card) 72' | Report | Teodorczyk (yellow card) 21', (goal) 87'; Nuytinck (yellow card) 35'; Mbodji (yellow card) 74' | Stadium: Jan Breydel Stadium; Attendance: 27,106; Referee: E. Lambrechts |

| 26 October 2016 12 | Club Brugge | 4–0 | Westerlo | Bruges |
| 20:30 CEST (UTC+2) | D. Cools 13', 88'; Vormer (yellow card) 45+1'; Pina (yellow card) 77' | Report | Ganvoula (red card) 34'; Heylen (yellow card) 69'; Hyland (red card) 69' | Stadium: Jan Breydel Stadium; Attendance: 25,781; Referee: J. Lardot |

| 29 October 2016 13 | Zulte Waregem | 0–0 | Club Brugge | Waregem |
| 18:00 CEST (UTC+2) | Derijck (yellow card) 90+3' | Report | Pina (yellow card) 83' | Stadium: Regenboogstadion; Attendance: 12,123; Referee: S. Gumienny |

| 6 November 2016 14 | Club Brugge | 1–1 | Genk | Bruges |
| 14:30 CET (UTC+1) | D. Cools (yellow card) 27'; Denswil (yellow card) 74'; Vossen 85' | Report | Ndidi (yellow card) 9'; Buffel 49'; Bizot (yellow card) 76'; Samatta (yellow card) 90' | Stadium: Jan Breydel Stadium; Attendance: 27,033; Referee: N. Laforge |

| 18 November 2016 15 | Sint-Truiden | 0–1 | Club Brugge | Sint-Truiden |
| 20:30 CET (UTC+1) | Bezus (yellow card) 29'; Cuevas (yellow card) 53'; Peeters (yellow card) 83'; Djené (yellow card) 90+5' | Report | Izquierdo (yellow card) 27'; Vossen (yellow card) 46', (goal) 90+5' (pen.); Van Rhijn (yellow card) 83'; Claudemir (yellow card) 90' | Stadium: Stayen; Attendance: 8,252; Referee: L. Visser |

| 25 November 2016 16 | Club Brugge | 6–1 | Mechelen | Bruges |
| 20:30 CET (UTC+1) | Vossen 39' (pen.), 52', 64', 82'; Izquierdo 49'; Denswil (yellow card) 60'; Vanaken 79' | Report | Chen (yellow card) 38'; Bjelica 51'; Veselinović (penalty missed) 59'; Filipović (yellow card) 76' | Stadium: Jan Breydel Stadium; Attendance: 28,500; Referee: W. Smet |

| 3 December 2016 17 | Club Brugge | 2–0 | Oostende | Bruges |
| 18:00 CET (UTC+1) | Denswil (yellow card) 52'; Izquierdo 58'; Poulain (yellow card) 76'; Vossen 90+4' (pen.) | Report | Berrier (yellow card) 50'; Milić (yellow card) 70'; Marušić (yellow card) 90+2' | Stadium: Jan Breydel Stadium; Attendance: 28,000; Referee: L. Wouters |

| 11 December 2016 18 | Anderlecht | 0–0 | Club Brugge | Anderlecht |
| 14:30 CET (UTC+1) | Badji (yellow card) 50' | Report | Denswil (yellow card) 24' | Stadium: Constant Vanden Stock Stadium; Attendance: 20,000; Referee: S. Delferiere |

| 18 December 2016 19 | Club Brugge | 5–1 | Kortrijk | Bruges |
| 18:00 CET (UTC+1) | Van Rhijn 13'; Refaelov 21'; D. Cools (yellow card) 28'; Vormer (yellow card) 58', (goal) 85'; Vanaken (yellow card) 70'; Vossen (penalty missed) 73', 81'; Claudemir (yellow card) 79' | Report | Verstraete (yellow card) 12'; Métanire (yellow card) 30'; Rolland (yellow card) 59'; Kaminski 90+2' | Stadium: Jan Breydel Stadium; Attendance: 26,294; Referee: E. Lambrechts |

| 21 December 2016 20 | Eupen | 1–4 | Club Brugge | Eupen |
| 20:30 CET (UTC+1) | Sylla 11'; Bassey (yellow card) 27'; Diallo (yellow card) 71'; García (yellow card) 71' | Report | Vormer 15', 40', (yellow card) 86'; Blondelle 25' (o.g.); Izquierdo 54', (yellow card) 73' | Stadium: Kehrweg Stadion; Attendance: 4,266; Referee: B. Vertenten |

| 26 December 2016 21 | Club Brugge | 2–1 | Excel Mouscron | Bruges |
| 20:30 CET (UTC+1) | D. Cools (yellow card) 56'; Van Rhijn 61'; Vossen 68' | Report | Nkaka (yellow card) 8', (yellow card) 74'; Mohamed (yellow card) 60' | Stadium: Jan Breydel Stadium; Attendance: 27,000; Referee: L. Visser |

| 22 January 2017 22 | Standard Liège | 0–3 | Club Brugge | Liège |
| 14:30 CET (UTC+1) | Goreux (yellow card) 71' | Report | Vossen 22'; Denswil (yellow card) 33'; Vormer 66'; Wesley 70' | Stadium: Stade Maurice Dufrasne; Attendance: 27,000; Referee: S. Gumienny |

| 25 January 2017 23 | Club Brugge | 2–1 | Waasland-Beveren | Bruges |
| 20:30 CET (UTC+1) | Immers 9'; Vanaken (yellow card) 65'; Izquierdo 74' | Report | Gano 54' | Stadium: Jan Breydel Stadium; Attendance: 26,000; Referee: B. Van Driessche |

| 29 January 2017 24 | Gent | 2–0 | Club Brugge | Ghent |
| 14:30 CET (UTC+1) | Coulibaly (yellow card) 14', (goal) 90+3'; Kubo 53'; Asare (yellow card) 85'; Neto (yellow card) 90+2' | Report | Refaelov (yellow card) 45'; D. Cools (yellow card) 56'; Palacios (yellow card) 72' | Stadium: Ghelamco Arena; Attendance: 19,999; Referee: N. Laforge |

| 5 February 2017 25 | Club Brugge | 1–0 | Charleroi | Bruges |
| 14:30 CET (UTC+1) | Vossen 72'; Izquierdo (yellow card) 87' | Report | Harbaoui (yellow card) 80' | Stadium: Jan Breydel Stadium; Attendance: 28,000; Referee: B. Vertenten |

| 12 February 2017 26 | Lokeren | 1–0 | Club Brugge | Lokeren |
| 18:00 CET (UTC+1) | De Sutter 27'; De Ridder (yellow card) 75'; Persoons (yellow card) 75' | Report | Izquierdo (yellow card) 90' | Stadium: Daknamstadion; Attendance: 9,022; Referee: E. Lambrechts |

| 17 February 2017 27 | Westerlo | 1–2 | Club Brugge | Westerlo |
| 20:30 CET (UTC+1) | Ganvoula 16' | Report | Vanaken 72', 83' | Stadium: Het Kuipje; Attendance: 8,000; Referee: J. Lardot |

| 24 February 2017 28 | Club Brugge | 5–0 | Zulte Waregem | Bruges |
| 20:30 CET (UTC+1) | Vormer 4', 41'; Engels 28'; Izquierdo 31'; Vossen 50' (pen.) | Report | Lerager (yellow card) 82' | Stadium: Jan Breydel Stadium; Attendance: 28,000; Referee: S. Gumienny |

| 4 March 2017 29 | Genk | 2–1 | Club Brugge | Genk |
| 20:00 CET (UTC+1) | Samatta 5', 42'; Malinovskyi (yellow card) 73' | Report | De Bock (yellow card) 20'; Izquierdo 43'; Van Rhijn (yellow card) 64' (yellow-red card) 90+2' | Stadium: Fenix Stadion; Attendance: 19,350; Referee: S. Delferiere |

| 12 March 2017 30 | Club Brugge | 2–2 | Sint-Truiden | Bruges |
| 14:30 CET (UTC+1) | Butelle (yellow card) 38'; Vanaken 52'; Claudemir 57' | Report | De Petter 38'; Ceballos (yellow card) 49'; Djené (yellow card) 68'; Gerkens 84'; Cuevas (yellow card) 86' | Stadium: Jan Breydel Stadium; Attendance: 26,605; Referee: N. Laforge |

==== Championship play-offs ====
===== League table =====
| Pos | Team | Pld | W | D | L | GF | GA | GD | Pts | Qualification | AND | CLU | GNT | OOS | CHA | ZWA |
|---|---|---|---|---|---|---|---|---|---|---|---|---|---|---|---|---|
| 1 | Anderlecht (C) | 10 | 6 | 3 | 1 | 14 | 6 | +8 | 52 | Qualification for the Champions League group stage | — | 2–0 | 0–0 | 3–2 | 0–1 | 2–0 |
| 2 | Club Brugge | 10 | 4 | 3 | 3 | 16 | 14 | +2 | 45 | Qualification for the Champions League third qualifying round | 1–1 | — | 2–1 | 3–1 | 1–1 | 2–1 |
| 3 | Gent | 10 | 4 | 4 | 2 | 16 | 11 | +5 | 41 | Qualification for the Europa League third qualifying round | 0–0 | 2–1 | — | 1–1 | 1–1 | 5–2 |
| 4 | Oostende (O) | 10 | 3 | 3 | 4 | 14 | 17 | −3 | 37 | Qualification for the Europa League play-off final | 0–1 | 2–1 | 4–3 | — | 1–0 | 1–1 |
| 5 | Charleroi | 10 | 2 | 4 | 4 | 10 | 13 | −3 | 35 | | 1–3 | 1–3 | 0–1 | 1–1 | — | 2–0 |
| 6 | Zulte Waregem | 10 | 1 | 3 | 6 | 12 | 21 | −9 | 33 | Qualification for the Europa League group stage (Note: Zulte Waregem qualified for the Europa League group stage by winning the 2016–17 Belgian Cup.) | 1–2 | 2–2 | 0–2 | 3–1 | 2–2 | — |

Source: Soccerway
Rules for classification: 1) Points; 2) Points without (possible) half points added due to rounding; 3) Matches won; 4) Goal difference; 5) Goals scored; 6) Away goals scored; 7) Away matches won; 8) Play-off.
(C) Champions; (O) Play-off winners

===== Results summary =====
| Overall | | | | | | | | Home | | | | | | Away | | | | | |
| Pld | W | D | L | GF | GA | GD | Pts | W | D | L | GF | GA | GD | W | D | L | GF | GA | GD |
|---|---|---|---|---|---|---|---|---|---|---|---|---|---|---|---|---|---|---|---|
| 10 | 4 | 3 | 3 | 16 | 14 | +2 | 15 | 3 | 2 | 0 | 9 | 5 | +4 | 1 | 1 | 3 | 7 | 9 | −2 |

Source: Worldfootball

===== Results by round =====
| Round | 1 | 2 | 3 | 4 | 5 | 6 | 7 | 8 | 9 | 10 |
|---|---|---|---|---|---|---|---|---|---|---|
| Ground | A | H | A | A | H | H | A | H | A | H |
| Result | L | D | D | L | W | W | W | D | L | W |
| Position | 2 | 2 | 3 | 3 | 3 | 2 | 2 | 2 | 2 | 2 |
| Points | 30 | 31 | 32 | 32 | 35 | 38 | 41 | 42 | 42 | 45 |

Source: Worldfootball
A = Away; H = Home; W = Win; D = Draw; L = Loss

===== Matches =====
| 2 April 2017 1 | Gent | 2–1 | Club Brugge | Ghent |
| 18:00 CEST (UTC+2) | Kalu (yellow card) 3'; Simon 25', 45+1' (pen.); Dejaegere (yellow card) 41'; Troost-Ekong (yellow card) 47'; Coulibaly (yellow card) 50' (yellow-red card) 55' | Report | Wesley 8'; Vossen (yellow card) 39'; Poulain (yellow card) 41'; Claudemir (yellow card) 45' | Stadium: Ghelamco Arena; Attendance: 19,999; Referee: B. Vertenten |

| 8 April 2017 2 | Club Brugge | 1–1 | Charleroi | Bruges |
| 18:00 CEST (UTC+2) | Wesley 48'; Simons (yellow card) 86' | Report | Bedia 75' (pen.); Diandy (yellow card) 81'; Willems (yellow card) 90+5' | Stadium: Jan Breydel Stadium; Attendance: 27,225; Referee: L. Wouters |

| 17 April 2017 3 | Zulte Waregem | 2–2 | Club Brugge | Waregem |
| 14:30 CEST (UTC+2) | Leye 14' (pen.), (yellow card) 77'; Dalsgaard 27'; Lepoint (yellow card) 62' | Report | Vanaken 33'; Wesley 54'; Simons (yellow card) 60'; Claudemir (yellow card) 65'; Immers (yellow card) 90+3' | Stadium: Regenboogstadion; Attendance: 10,560; Referee: L. Visser |

| 23 April 2017 4 | Anderlecht | 2–0 | Club Brugge | Anderlecht |
| 18:00 CEST (UTC+2) | Dendoncker 21', (yellow card) 28'; Mbodji 34'; Teodorczyk (yellow card) 39' | Report | Izquierdo (yellow card) 38'; Vormer (yellow card) 39' (yellow-red card) 45'; Limbombe (yellow card) 74' | Stadium: Constant Vanden Stock Stadium; Attendance: 26,361; Referee: S. Gumienny |

| 26 April 2017 5 | Club Brugge | 3–1 | Oostende | Bruges |
| 20:30 CEST (UTC+2) | Vossen 32'; Izquierdo 33', 69'; Simons (yellow card) 71' | Report | Dimata 15', (yellow card) 90+6'; Musona (yellow card) 57'; Godeau (yellow card) 90+1' | Stadium: Jan Breydel Stadium; Attendance: 27,060; Referee: W. Smet |

| 1 May 2017 6 | Club Brugge | 2–1 | Zulte Waregem | Bruges |
| 18:00 CEST (UTC+2) | Vanaken 21'; Rotariu 40' | Report | Derijck 6' | Stadium: Jan Breydel Stadium; Attendance: 27,074; Referee: A. Boucaut |

| 5 May 2017 7 | Charleroi | 1–3 | Club Brugge | Charleroi |
| 20:30 CEST (UTC+2) | Pollet 47' | Report | Izquierdo 45+1', 48', 77' | Stadium: Stade du Pays de Charleroi; Attendance: 11,163; Referee: J. Lardot |

| 14 May 2017 8 | Club Brugge | 1–1 | Anderlecht | Bruges |
| 18:00 CEST (UTC+2) | Vormer 36'; Vanaken (yellow card) 39'; Engels (yellow card) 64' | Report | Hanni 9', (yellow card) 73'; Mbodji (yellow card) 39'; Tielemans (penalty missed) 65'; Chipciu (yellow card) 76'; Appiah (yellow card) 81'; Acheampong (yellow card) 90+1' | Stadium: Jan Breydel Stadium; Attendance: 27,490; Referee: S. Delferiere |

| 18 May 2017 9 | Oostende | 2–1 | Club Brugge | Ostend |
| 20:30 CEST (UTC+2) | Rozehnal 30'; Akpala 82'; Musona (yellow card) 90' | Report | Rotariu (yellow card) 23'; Touba (yellow card) 29'; Palacios (yellow card) 42'; Wesley 72'; Claudemir (yellow card) 90+4' | Stadium: Versluys Arena; Attendance: 7,027; Referee: C. Dierick |

| 21 May 2017 10 | Club Brugge | 2–1 | Gent | Bruges |
| 14:30 CEST (UTC+2) | Vossen (yellow card) 14'; Wesley (yellow card) 24', (yellow card) 61'; Vanaken (yellow card) 57', (yellow card) 90+1' | Report | Neto (yellow card) 60'; Saief (yellow card) 70'; Mitrović (yellow card) 85' | Stadium: Jan Breydel Stadium; Attendance: 27,800; Referee: B. Vertenten |

=== Belgian Cup ===
| 20 September 2016 Sixth Round | Club Brugge | 3–1 | Lommel United | Bruges |
| 20:00 CEST (UTC+2) | Vormer 39'; Gedoz 45+2'; Limbombe 62' | Report | Adesanya 14' | Stadium: Jan Breydel Stadium |

| 29 November 2016 Seventh Round | Eupen | 3–2 | Club Brugge | Eupen |
| 20:00 CET (UTC+1) | García 21'; Onyekuru 47'; Blondelle 90+4' | Report | Vanaken 60'; Vossen 65' | Stadium: Kehrweg Stadion |

=== Belgian Super Cup ===
| 23 July 2016 Final | Club Brugge | 2–1 | Standard Liège | Bruges |
| 20:00 CEST (UTC+2) | Vanaken (red card) 41'; Izquierdo 51'; Vormer 62'; Claudemir (yellow card) 71'; Vossen (yellow card) 85' | Report | Santini 39'; Cissé (yellow card) 44'; Yattara (yellow card) 90+3' | Stadium: Jan Breydel Stadium; Attendance: 15,000; Referee: W. Smet |

=== UEFA Champions League ===
==== Group stage ====
| Pos | Team | Pld | W | D | L | GF | GA | GD | Pts | Qualification | LEI | POR | CPH | BRU |
|---|---|---|---|---|---|---|---|---|---|---|---|---|---|---|
| 1 | (England) Leicester City | 6 | 4 | 1 | 1 | 7 | 6 | +1 | 13 | Advance to knockout phase | — | 1–0 | 1–0 | 2–1 |
| 2 | (Portugal) Porto | 6 | 3 | 2 | 1 | 9 | 3 | +6 | 11 | Advance to knockout phase | 5–0 | — | 1–1 | 1–0 |
| 3 | (Denmark) Copenhagen | 6 | 2 | 3 | 1 | 7 | 2 | +5 | 9 | Transfer to Europa League | 0–0 | 0–0 | — | 4–0 |
| 4 | (Belgium) Club Brugge | 6 | 0 | 0 | 6 | 2 | 14 | −12 | 0 | | 0–3 | 1–2 | 0–2 | — |

Source: UEFA
Rules for classification: Group stage tiebreakers

| 14 September 2016 1 | Club Brugge (Belgium) | 0–3 | (England) Leicester City | Bruges, Belgium |
| 20:45 CEST (UTC+2) | Simons (yellow card) 28'; Engels (yellow card) 35'; Butelle (yellow card) 60'; Vormer (yellow card) 90+3' | Report | Albrighton 5'; Mahrez 29', 61' (pen.); Slimani (yellow card) 48'; Ulloa (yellow card) 90' | Stadium: Jan Breydel Stadium; Attendance: 20,917; Referee: Anastasios Sidiropoulos (Greece); Assistant referees: Damianos Efthimiadis (Greece), Polychronis Kostaras (Greece); Fourth official: Lazaros Dimitriadis (Greece); Goal-line assistants: Charalampos Kalogeropoulos (Greece), Alexandros Aretopoulos (Greece) |

| 27 September 2016 2 | Copenhagen (Denmark) | 4–0 | (Belgium) Club Brugge | Copenhagen, Denmark |
| 20:45 CEST (UTC+2) | Denswil 53' (o.g.); Jørgensen (yellow card) 56', (goal) 90+2'; Augustinsson (penalty missed) 61'; Delaney 64'; Santander 69' | Report | Vormer (yellow card) 58'; Simons (yellow card) 65'; Claudemir (yellow card) 88' | Stadium: Parken Stadium; Attendance: 25,605; Referee: Craig Thomson (Scotland); Assistant referees: David McGeachie (Scotland), Alan Mulvanny (Scotland); Fourth official: Graeme Stewart (Scotland); Goal-line assistants: Steven McLean (Scotland), Andrew Dallas (Scotland) |

| 18 October 2016 3 | Club Brugge (Belgium) | 1–2 | (Portugal) Porto | Bruges, Belgium |
| 20:45 CEST (UTC+2) | Vossen 12'; Limbombe (yellow card) 43'; Simons (yellow card) 83' | Report | Layún (yellow card) 41', (goal) 68'; Silva (yellow card) 90+3' | Stadium: Jan Breydel Stadium; Attendance: 23,325; Referee: Paolo Tagliavento (Italy); Assistant referees: Alessandro Costanzo (Italy), Filippo Meli (Italy); Fourth official: Alessandro Giallatini (Italy); Goal-line assistants: Paolo Valeri (Italy), Davide Massa (Italy) |

| 2 November 2016 4 | Porto (Portugal) | 1–0 | (Belgium) Club Brugge | Porto, Portugal |
| 19:45 WET (UTC) | Herrera (yellow card) 3'; Felipe (yellow card) 35'; Silva 37' | Report | Denswil (yellow card) 34'; Diaby (yellow card) 41'; Vormer (yellow card) 86'; Claudemir (yellow card) 88' | Stadium: Estádio do Dragão; Attendance: 32,310; Referee: Alberto Undiano Mallenco (Spain); Assistant referees: Raúl Cabañero (Spain), Diego Barbero (Spain); Fourth official: Ángel Nevado (Spain); Goal-line assistants: David Fernández Borbalán (Spain), José María Sánchez Martínez (Spain) |

| 22 November 2016 5 | Leicester City (England) | 2–1 | (Belgium) Club Brugge | Leicester, England |
| 19:45 GMT (UTC) | Okazaki 5'; Mahrez 30' (pen.); Zieler (yellow card) 90' | Report | Izquierdo 52' | Stadium: King Power Stadium; Attendance: 31,443; Referee: Ruddy Buquet (France); Assistant referees: Guillaume Debart (France), Frédéric Cano (France); Fourth official: Cyril Gringore (France); Goal-line assistants: Tony Chapron (France), Amaury Delerue (France) |

| 7 December 2016 6 | Club Brugge (Belgium) | 0–2 | (Denmark) Copenhagen | Bruges, Belgium |
| 20:45 CET (UTC+1) | Denswil (yellow card) 83' | Report | Mechele 8' (o.g.); Pavlović (yellow card) 10'; Jørgensen 15'; Kvist (yellow card) 45' | Stadium: Jan Breydel Stadium; Attendance: 18,981; Referee: Michael Oliver (England); Assistant referees: Gary Beswick (England), Simon Bennett (England); Fourth official: Ian Hussin (England); Goal-line assistants: Craig Pawson (England), Jonathan Moss (England) |
