= Marvelous Nakamba =

Zimbabwean footballer (born 1994)

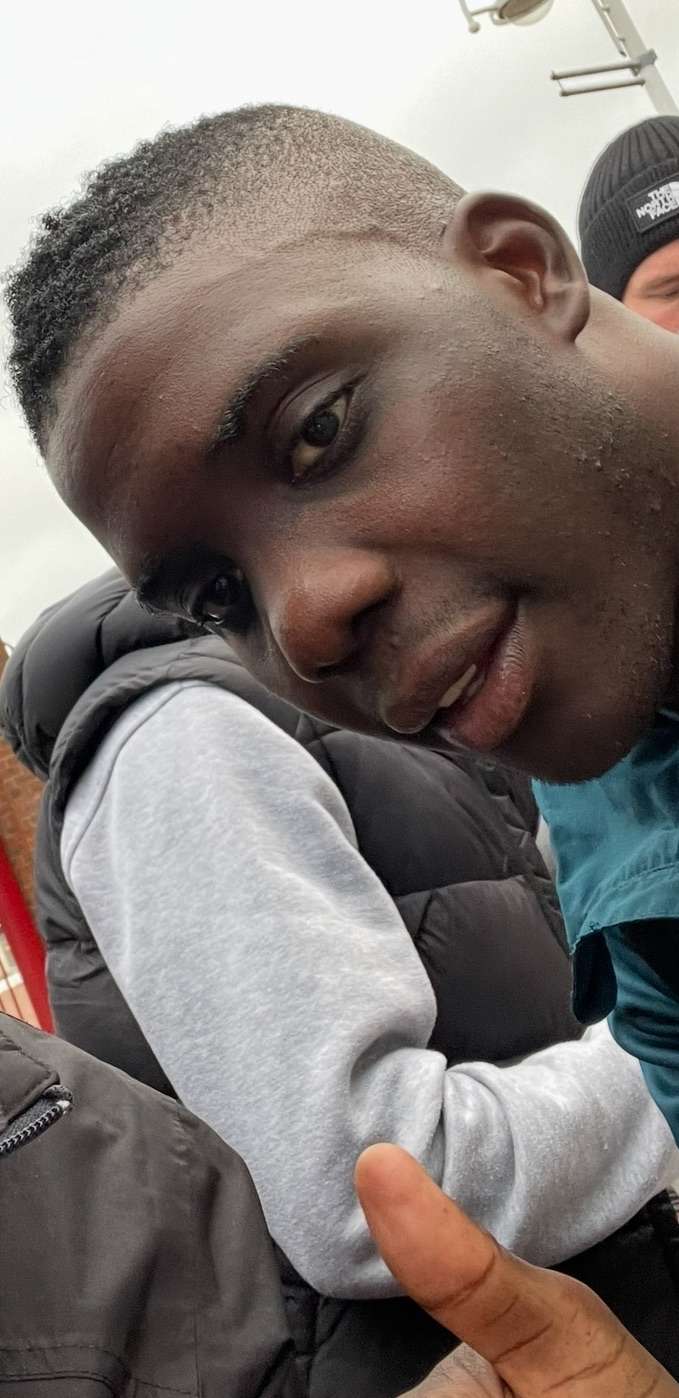
- Nakamba with Luton Town in 2024

Personal information
- Full name: Marvelous Nakamba
- Date of birth: 19 January 1994 (age 32)
- Place of birth: Hwange, Zimbabwe
- Height: 1.78 m (5 ft 10 in)
- Position: Defensive midfielder

Team information
- Current team: Panetolikos
- Number: 6

Youth career
- –2008: Highlanders

Senior career*
Years	Team	Apps	(Gls)
2009–2012	Bantu Rovers		
2012–2014	Nancy II	32	(1)
2014	Nancy	2	(0)
2014–2017	Vitesse	67	(2)
2017–2019	Club Brugge	53	(0)
2019–2023	Aston Villa	58	(0)
2023	→ Luton Town (loan)	17	(0)
2023–2026	Luton Town	35	(0)
2026	Sheffield Wednesday	5	(0)
2026–	Panetolikos	10	(0)

International career^{‡}
2012	Zimbabwe U20		
2015–	Zimbabwe	40	(0)
- * Club domestic league appearances and goals as of 18:30, 22 November 2026 (UTC) ‡ National team caps and goals as of 14:09, 1 April 2026 (UTC)

Marvelous Nakamba (born 19 January 1994) is a Zimbabwean professional footballer who plays as a defensive midfielder for Greek Super League club Panetolikos and the Zimbabwe national team.

Nakamba started his career in his native Zimbabwe with Bantu Rovers before moving to Nancy in 2012. After mainly playing for Nancy's second team, he moved to Vitesse, where he became a regular player for the club. Nakamba would later join Club Brugge, winning the 2017–18 Belgian First Division A in his first season with the club. In 2019, he moved to Premier League side Aston Villa, before joining Luton Town on loan, being part of the squad that achieved promotion via the playoffs. He has been part of three Africa Cup of Nations squads with Zimbabwe.

== Club career ==
=== Early career ===
Born in Hwange near Victoria Falls in Zimbabwe, Nakamba made his senior debut with local team Bantu Rovers in 2010, aged 16. He left the country in July 2012, and had trials at French side Nancy.

Nakamba officially joined Nancy on 24 December 2012, aged 18, for an undisclosed fee. He received the international clearance seven days later, and was assigned to the reserve team in CFA.

On 9 May 2014, Nakamba played his first match as a professional, starting in a 3–1 home win against Angers SCO. He played his second match seven days later, coming on as a late substitute in a 0–0 away draw against AJ Auxerre, and a new deal was offered to him on 19 May.

=== Vitesse ===
In July 2014, Nakamba went on a trial at Eredivisie side Vitesse. On 13 August, he signed a four-year deal with the Arnhem side aged 20 years. Nakamba made his debut for the club on 27 September, coming on as a late substitute for Kelvin Leerdam in a 6–2 away win against Dordrecht. Nakamba started to establish himself in Vitesse's starting eleven during the 2015–16 campaign and went on to appear thirty times, scoring once against local rivals De Graafschap in a 2–2 draw.

He played as Vitesse won the final of the KNVB Beker 2–0 against AZ Alkmaar on 30 April 2017 to lead the club, three-time runners up, to the title for the first time in its 125-year history.

=== Club Brugge ===
On 20 June 2017, Nakamba joined Belgian side Club Brugge on a four-year deal for a fee around the margin of £4 million, aged 23 years. He made his league debut for the club on 29 July 2017 in a 4–0 away victory over Sporting Lokeren. He was replaced by Hans Vanaken in the 75th minute, having picked up a yellow card.

=== Aston Villa ===
On 1 August 2019, Marvelous Nakamba signed for Aston Villa aged 25 years, for a fee of €12 million. He joined up with former Club Brugge team-mate Wesley Moraes and former Club Brugge player Björn Engels, who had already joined Villa in that transfer window. Nakamba made his first appearance for Villa in a 6–1 emphatic victory against Crewe Alexandra in an EFL Cup game. Nakamba made his Premier League debut on 16 September 2019, in a 0–0 draw against West Ham at Villa Park.

In October 2019, a video purportedly showing racist chants from Aston Villa fans about Nakamba and teammate John McGinn surfaced, and was condemned by the club.

Nakamba was voted by fans as player of the month for November 2021, following a string of good performances under new Aston Villa manager Steven Gerrard. On 11 December 2021, Nakamba suffered a serious knee injury in a 1–0 defeat to Liverpool, the injury required surgery, with an estimated recovery time of three to four months, ruling Nakamba out of the 2021 Africa Cup of Nations.

==== Loan to Luton Town ====
On 31 January 2023, having not made an appearance for Aston Villa so far that season, Nakamba joined EFL Championship club Luton Town on loan for the remainder of the season. On 4 February 2023, he made his debut in a 1–0 victory over Stoke City. On 27 May 2023, Nakamba and his team secured promotion to the Premier League against Coventry City in the 2023 EFL Championship play-off final.

=== Luton Town ===
On 20 July 2023, Nakamba joined Luton Town on a permanent deal for an undisclosed fee. His contract was mutually terminated on 2 February 2026 having made 61 appearances in a Luton Town shirt.

=== Sheffield Wednesday ===
On 2 February 2026, Nakamba joined Championship side, Sheffield Wednesday for the remainder of the season. He made his debut coming off the bench in the 0–4 defeat to Swansea City on 8 February 2026. He wouldn't make his first start until April, when they lost 1–0 to Middlesbrough. At the end of the 2025–26 season, it was confirmed that he would be leaving at the end of his contract.

=== Panetolikos ===
On 7 August 2026, Nakamba joined Greek Super League club club Panetolikos on a two-year contract.

== International career ==
Nakamba is a Zimbabwe international, having represented the country in the under-20 level. On 13 June 2015, aged 21 years, he made his debut with the main squad, coming on as a second-half substitute in a 2–1 win against Malawi.

Nakamba competed for the Africa Cup of Nations in 2017 and 2019 with Zimbabwe.

On 11 December 2025, Nakamba was called up to the Zimbabwe squad for the 2025 Africa Cup of Nations.

== Personal life ==
Nakamba was born in Hwange in north-western Zimbabwe. He secretly married his long-term girlfriend Chipo Primrose Makurumure in 2020 during a short visit to Bulawayo. His father Anthony was also a footballer, playing as a goalkeeper for Hwange Colliery F.C. and his mother Charity worked as a maid for a family in South Africa. As a child his family experienced poverty, living together in a one-bedroom home in Bulawayo with his younger brother Junior. His mother worked overtime to buy Marvelous his first pair of Puma football boots.

After Nakamba's Premier League debut on 16 September 2019, Zimbabwean footballer Peter Ndlovu confirmed that Nakamba would have a statue built in his honour in Hwange, as he was only the 4th Zimbabwean player to play in the English Football League.

== Charitable work ==
In March 2020, Nakamba created the Marvelous Nakamba Foundation - an organisation funded by Nakamba which aimed to help improve the lives of young people in Zimbabwe. On 22 March 2020, Nakamba paid the tuition and examination fees of 1000 pupils from underprivileged backgrounds in Bulawayo. His goal was to reach 100,000 pupils by December 2021 and then 1 million pupils by 2024. On 5 May 2021, Nakamba met Prince William, Duke of Cambridge, after the Marvelous Nakamba foundation had been involved in several projects around Zimbabwe, including working to revamp Hwange Hospital, feed programmes for children at rural schools, the provision of personal protective equipment for schools during the COVID-19 pandemic in Zimbabwe.

In May 2021, Nakamba announced the creation of the Marvelous Nakamba Foundation Youth Invitational Tournament - an under-17 football tournament. It was originally scheduled for June 2021, however this was postponed due to the COVID-19 pandemic. On 5 June 2022, Nakamba announced that he had finally received clearance from authorities for the tournament to go ahead at the White City Stadium in Bulawayo on 25 & 26 June. The tournament went ahead as planned, with the youth academy of Majesa defeating Highlanders academy in the final.

In June 2021, Nakamba's charitable works were recognised by Zimbabwean President Emmerson Mnangagwa, who said that he was "eager to plough [his earnings] back into the community"

On 13 June 2022, the Marvelous Nakamba Foundation started construction work on a multi-sports complex in Bulawayo with football, tennis, basketball, volleyball and swimming facilities. Nakamba took part in a groundbreaking ceremony on the first day of building.

On 16 June 2022, International Day of the African Child, Nakamba announced that he was working with UNICEF on projects to help protect young girls from child marriage in Zimbabwe.

== Career statistics ==
=== Club ===
As of 22 November 2026

Appearances and goals by club, season and competition
Club	Season	League			National cup (Note: Includes KNVB Cup, Belgian Cup, FA Cup)		League cup (Note: Includes EFL Cup)		Europe		Other		Total	
Club	Season	Division	Apps	Goals	Apps	Goals	Apps	Goals	Apps	Goals	Apps	Goals	Apps	Goals
Nancy II	2012–13	CFA Group B	12	0	—		—		—		—		12	0
Nancy II	2013–14	CFA 2 Group C	20	1	—		—		—		—		20	1
Nancy II	Total		32	1	—		—		—		—		32	1
Nancy	2013–14	Ligue 2	2	0	0	0	0	0	—		—		2	0
Vitesse	2014–15	Eredivisie	6	0	0	0	—		—		2 (Note: Appearances in Eredivisie European play-offs)	0	8	0
Vitesse	2015–16	Eredivisie	30	1	1	0	—		2 (Note: Appearances in UEFA Europa League)	0	—		33	1
Vitesse	2016–17	Eredivisie	31	1	5	1	—		—		—		36	2
Vitesse	Total		67	2	6	1	—		2	0	2	0	77	3
Club Brugge	2017–18	Belgian Pro League	35	0	5	0	—		4 (Note: Two appearances in UEFA Champions League, two appearances in UEFA Europa League)	0	—		44	0
Club Brugge	2018–19	Belgian Pro League	18	0	0	0	—		5 (Note: Appearances in UEFA Champions League)	0	0	0	23	0
Club Brugge	Total		53	0	5	0	—		9	0	0	0	67	0
Aston Villa	2019–20	Premier League	29	0	1	0	4	0	—		—		34	0
Aston Villa	2020–21	Premier League	13	0	0	0	3	0	—		—		16	0
Aston Villa	2021–22	Premier League	16	0	0	0	2	0	—		—		18	0
Aston Villa	2022–23	Premier League	0	0	0	0	0	0	—		—		0	0
Aston Villa	Total		58	0	1	0	9	0	—		—		68	0
Luton Town (loan)	2022–23	Championship	17	0	0	0	—		—		3 (Note: Appearances in Championship play-offs)	0	20	0
Luton Town	2023–24	Premier League	13	0	0	0	1	0	—		—		14	0
Luton Town	2024–25	Championship	21	0	1	0	1	0	—		—		23	0
Luton Town	2025–26	League One	1	0	0	0	0	0	—		3 (Note: Appearances in EFL Trophy)	0	4	0
Luton Town	Luton Town total		52	0	1	0	2	0	—		6	0	60	0
Sheffield Wednesday	2025–26	Championship	5	0	—		—		—		—		5	0
Panetolikos	2026–27	Greek Super League	10	0	0	0	—		—		—		10	0
Career total			277	3	13	1	11	0	11	0	8	0	320	4

=== International ===
As of match played 31 March 2026

Appearances and goals by national team and year
National team	Year	Apps	Goals
Zimbabwe	2015	1	0
Zimbabwe	2016	4	0
Zimbabwe	2017	5	0
Zimbabwe	2018	5	0
Zimbabwe	2019	5	0
Zimbabwe	2020	3	0
Zimbabwe	2021	3	0
Zimbabwe	2023	2	0
Zimbabwe	2024	3	0
Zimbabwe	2025	7	0
Zimbabwe	2026	2	0
Total		40	0

== Honours ==
Vitesse

- KNVB Cup: 2016–17

Club Brugge

- Belgian First Division A: 2017–18

Aston Villa

- EFL Cup runner-up: 2019–20

Luton Town

- EFL Championship play-offs: 2023
