= 2017–18 Club Brugge KV season =

Club Brugge
2017–18 season
- Chairman: Bart Verhaeghe
- Head coach: Ivan Leko
- Stadium: Jan Breydel Stadium
- Belgian First Division A: 1st
- Belgian Cup: Semi-finals
- UEFA Champions League: Third qualifying round
- UEFA Europa League: Play-off round
- Top goalscorer: League: Abdoulay Diaby (15); All: Abdoulay Diaby (16)
colours	colours	Third colours

The 2017–18 season was Club Brugge's 126th season in existence and the club's 58th consecutive season in the top flight of Belgian football. Club Brugge participated in the Belgian First Division A, Belgian Cup and on the European stage in the UEFA Champions League and UEFA Europa League.

The club would win their 15th league this season, edging out closest competitors Standard Liège by 3 points following the championship round. The result was clinched in the penultimate match of the season, after a 1–1 draw away to Standard.

The season covered the period from 1 July 2017 to 30 June 2018.

== First-team squad ==
As of 15 January 2018

Note: Flags indicate national team as defined under FIFA eligibility rules; some limited exceptions apply. Players may hold more than one non-FIFA nationality.

No.	Pos.	Nation	Player
1	GK	RUS	Vladimir Gabulov
3	MF	BEL	Timmy Simons
5	DF	FRA	Benoît Poulain
6	MF	NED	Jordy Clasie (on loan from Southampton)
7	FW	BRA	Wesley
8	FW	ISR	Lior Refaelov (Vice-captain)
9	FW	BEL	Jelle Vossen
10	FW	MLI	Abdoulay Diaby
11	FW	SEN	Krépin Diatta
14	DF	CRO	Ivan Tomečak
17	FW	BEL	Anthony Limbombe
18	GK	BEL	Guillaume Hubert
19	FW	BEL	Thibault Vlietinck
20	MF	BEL	Hans Vanaken

No.	Pos.	Nation	Player
21	DF	BEL	Dion Cools
22	GK	USA	Ethan Horvath
24	DF	NED	Stefano Denswil
25	MF	NED	Ruud Vormer (Captain)
30	MF	ZIM	Marvelous Nakamba
32	GK	NED	Kenneth Vermeer (on loan from Feyenoord)
35	DF	SUI	Saulo Decarli
40	MF	BEL	Jordi Vanlerberghe
42	FW	NGR	Emmanuel Dennis
44	DF	BEL	Brandon Mechele
55	DF	SRB	Erhan Mašović
96	DF	BEL	Ahmed Touba
TBD	DF	CRO	Matej Mitrovic (on loan from Beşiktaş)
TBD	DF	DEN	Alexander Scholz

== Club friendlies ==
24 June 2017	(Belgium) Club Brugge	9–0	(Belgium) VV Westkapelle
19:00		Summary

28 June 2017	(Belgium) Oudenaarde	0–6	(Belgium) Club Brugge
19:00		Summary

1 July 2017	(Belgium) Torhout	0–2	(Belgium) Club Brugge
19:00		Summary

15 July 2017	(Belgium) Club Brugge	1–3	(Netherlands) AZ
19:00		Summary

21 July 2017	(Belgium) Club Brugge	0–2	(Spain) Athletic Bilbao
19:00		Summary

== Competitions ==
=== Belgian First Division A ===
==== Regular season ====
===== Results summary =====
Pos	Team	Pld	W	D	L	GF	GA	GD	Pts	Qualification or relegation
1	Club Brugge	30	20	7	3	68	33	+35	67	Qualification for the championship play-offs
2	Anderlecht	30	16	7	7	49	42	+7	55	Qualification for the championship play-offs
3	Charleroi	30	13	12	5	46	30	+16	51	Qualification for the championship play-offs
4	Gent	30	14	8	8	45	27	+18	50	Qualification for the championship play-offs
5	Genk	30	11	11	8	44	36	+8	44	Qualification for the championship play-offs

Source: Belgian First Division A (in Dutch), Soccerway
Rules for classification: 1) Points; 2) Matches won; 3) Goal difference; 4) Goals scored; 5) Away goals scored; 6) Away matches won; 7) Play-off.

Overall								Home						Away					
Pld	W	D	L	GF	GA	GD	Pts	W	D	L	GF	GA	GD	W	D	L	GF	GA	GD
30	20	7	3	68	33	+35	67	13	2	0	44	16	+28	7	5	3	24	17	+7

Last updated: 11 March 2018.

===== Results by matchday =====
Matchday	1	2	3	4	5	6	7	8	9	10	11	12	13	14	15	16	17	18	19	20	21	22	23	24	25	26	27	28	29	30
Ground	A	H	A	A	H	A	H	A	H	A	H	A	H	A	H	H	A	H	H	A	H	A	H	A	H	A	H	A	H	A
Result	W	W	W	W	W	L	W	W	W	W	W	L	W	D	W	W	D	W	W	W	W	D	W	L	D	D	D	D	W	W
Position	2	2	1	1	1	2	1	1	1	1	1	1	1	1	1	1	1	1	1	1	1	1	1	1	1	1	1	1	1	1

Updated to match(es) played on 16 April 2018. Source:
A = Away; H = Home; W = Win; D = Draw; L = Loss

==== Play-offs ====
Pos	Team	Pld	W	D	L	GF	GA	GD	Pts	Qualification	CLU	STA	AND	GNT	GNK	CHA
1	Club Brugge (C)	10	3	3	4	17	12	+5	46	Qualification for the Champions League group stage	—	4–4	1–2	0–1	1–0	6–0
2	Standard Liège	10	6	3	1	20	9	+11	43	Qualification for the Champions League third qualifying round	1–1	—	2–1	1–0	5–0	1–0
3	Anderlecht	10	4	0	6	12	15	−3	40	Qualification for the Europa League group stage	1–0	1–3	—	0–2	1–2	3–1
4	Gent	10	4	2	4	8	8	0	39	Qualification for the Europa League third qualifying round	1–0	1–3	1–0	—	0–0	0–1
5	Genk (O)	10	4	4	2	13	13	0	38	Qualification for the Europa League play-off final	1–1	1–0	2–1	1–1	—	4–1
6	Charleroi	10	2	2	6	9	22	−13	34		1–3	0–0	1–2	2–1	2–2	—

Source: Soccerway
Rules for classification: 1) Points; 2) Points without (possible) half points added due to rounding; 3) Position obtained during the Regular season
(C) Champions; (O) Play-off winners

===== Results summary =====
Overall								Home						Away					
Pld	W	D	L	GF	GA	GD	Pts	W	D	L	GF	GA	GD	W	D	L	GF	GA	GD
10	3	3	4	17	12	+5	12	2	1	2	12	7	+5	1	2	2	5	5	0

Last updated: 20 May 2018.

===== Results by matchday =====
Matchday	1	2	3	4	5	6	7	8	9	10
Ground	H	A	A	H	H	A	H	A	A	H
Result	W	L	L	W	D	D	L	W	D	L
Position	1	1	1	1	1	1	1	1	1	1

Updated to match(es) played on 20 May 2018. Source:
A = Away; H = Home; W = Win; D = Draw; L = Loss

===== Matches =====
29 July 2017 1	Lokeren	0–4	Club Brugge	Lokeren
18:00	Kehli (yellow card) 35'; Marić (yellow card) 81'; Mpati (yellow card) 83'	Report	Mechele 5'; Dennis 17', 24'; Palacios (red card) 32'; Nakamba (yellow card) 45+1'; Mirić 55' (o.g.)	Stadium: Daknamstadion; Attendance: 7,441; Referee: Sébastien Delferière

6 August 2017 2	Club Brugge	3–1	Eupen	Bruges
20:00	Vossen 32' (pen.); Dennis 65'; Limbombe (yellow card) 86'; Diaby 90+1'	Report	Diagne 19'; Blondelle (yellow card) 28' (yellow-red card); Lotiès (yellow card) 90+3'	Stadium: Jan Breydel Stadium; Attendance: 25,723; Referee: Alexandre Boucaut

=== Belgian Cup ===
20 September 2017 Round of 32	Roeselare	1–5	Club Brugge	Roeselare
20:30	Dufour (yellow card) 35' (goal) 42'	Report	Dennis 5' 30'; Vormer 16'; Wesley 38'; Vossen 82'	Stadium: Schiervelde Stadion; Referee: (Belgium) Jonathan Lardot

30 November 2017 Round of 16	Zulte Waregem	2–3 (a.e.t.)	Club Brugge	Waregem
20:45	Baudry (yellow card) 35'; De fauw 67' (pen.); Leya 72'; Šaponjić (yellow card) 86'; Kaya (yellow card) 90+1'	Report	Vossen 4'; Cools (yellow card) 26'; Mechele (yellow card) 53'; Nakamba (yellow card) 63'; Dennis 83' 106' (yellow card) 107'; Limbombe (yellow card) 98'	Stadium: Regenboogstadion; Attendance: 6,268; Referee: (Belgium) Sébastien Delferière

16 January 2018 Quarter-finals	Club Brugge	5–1	Sporting Charleroi	Bruges
20:45	Vanaken 11' 63'; Mechele 22' 33'; Wesley 35'	Report	N'Ganga 24'	Stadium: Jan Breydel Stadium; Attendance: 15,000; Referee: (Belgium) Bart Vertenten

31 January 2018 Semi-finals 1st Leg	Standard Liège	4–1	Club Brugge	Liège
20:45	Emond 19' 25' 54'; Cavanda (yellow card) 30'; Edmilson Junior 57' (yellow card) 72'	Summary	Clasie (yellow card) 41'; Vormer (yellow card) 72'; Dennis (yellow card) 76'; Mitrović 82'	Stadium: Stade Maurice Dufrasne; Attendance: 15,000; Referee: (Belgium) Nicolas Laforge

8 February 2018 Semi-finals 2nd Leg	Club Brugge	3–2 (4–6 agg.)	Standard Liège	Bruges
21:00	Vanaken 41' (yellow card) 90+5'; Vormer (yellow card) 60'; Abdoulay Diaby 62'; Clasie 75'	Summary	Orlando Sá 4' (yellow card) 42'; M'Poku (yellow card) 15'; Gillet (yellow card) 34'; Laifis (yellow card) 44'; Agbo (yellow card) 55'; Marin (yellow card) 63'; Emond 71'	Stadium: Jan Breydel Stadium; Attendance: 22,000; Referee: (Belgium) Bart Vertenten

=== UEFA Champions League ===
26 July 2017 Third qualifying round 1st Leg	(Belgium) Club Brugge	3–3	(Turkey) İstanbul Başakşehir	Bruges
21:00	Dennis 5'; Denswil 16' 78'	Summary	Mossoró 59' 73'; Epureanu (yellow card) 60'; Elia 63'	Stadium: Jan Breydel Stadium; Attendance: 26,788; Referee: (Italy) Paolo Mazzoleni

2 August 2017 Third qualifying round 2nd Leg	(Turkey) İstanbul Başakşehir	2–0 (5–3 agg.)	(Belgium) Club Brugge	Istanbul
19:45	Adebayor 7'; Júnior Caiçara (yellow card) 10'; Clichy (yellow card) 24'; Višća 34'	Summary	Dennis (yellow card) 23'; Denswil (yellow card) 42'; Vormer (yellow card) 65'	Stadium: Başakşehir Fatih Terim Stadium; Attendance: 9,168; Referee: (Romania) István Kovács (referee)

=== UEFA Europa League ===
17 August 2017 Play-off round 1st Leg	(Belgium) Club Brugge	0–0	(Greece) AEK Athens	Bruges
20:45	Wesley (yellow card) 66'; Vormer (yellow card) 74'; Denswil (yellow card) 90'	Report	Livaja (yellow card) 15' (yellow-red card); Vranješ (yellow card) 23'; Hélder Lopes (yellow card) 54'; Ćosić (yellow card) 68'	Stadium: Jan Breydel Stadium; Attendance: 27,115; Referee: (Hungary) Viktor Kassai

24 August 2017 Play-off round 2nd leg	(Greece) AEK Athens	3–0 (3–0 agg.)	(Belgium) Club Brugge	Athens
20:00	Christodoulopoulos 27' (pen.); André Simões 39' 90+1'; Bakakis (yellow card) 50'	Report	Palacios (yellow card) 25'; Nakamba (yellow card) 63'	Stadium: Olympic Stadium; Attendance: 14,275; Referee: (Spain) Jesús Gil Manzano

== Statistics ==
=== Squad appearances and goals ===
Last updated on 20 May 2018.

No.	Pos	Nat	Player	Total		Belgian Division		Belgian Cup		UEFA Champions League		UEFA Europa League	
No.	Pos	Nat	Player	Apps	Goals	Apps	Goals	Apps	Goals	Apps	Goals	Apps	Goals
Goalkeepers
1	GK	(Russia) RUS	Vladimir Gabulov	10	0	9	0	1	0	0	0	0	0
18	GK	(Belgium) BEL	Guillaume Hubert	6	0	4	0	2	0	0	0	0	0
22	GK	(United States) USA	Ethan Horvath	19	0	15	0	0	0	2	0	2	0
32	GK	(Netherlands) NED	Kenneth Vermeer	8	0	7	0	1	0	0	0	0	0
Defenders
2	DF	(Denmark) DEN	Alexander Scholz	6	0	3+2	0	1	0	0	0	0	0
5	DF	(France) FRA	Benoît Poulain	20	1	17+1	1	2	0	0	0	0	0
14	DF	(Croatia) CRO	Ivan Tomečak	6	1	3+2	1	0+1	0	0	0	0	0
15	DF	(Croatia) CRO	Matej Mitrovic	12	1	10	0	1+1	1	0	0	0	0
21	DF	(Belgium) BEL	Dion Cools	41	3	32+3	3	5	0	0	0	0+1	0
24	DF	(Netherlands) NED	Stefano Denswil	40	4	33	2	3	0	2	2	2	0
35	DF	(Switzerland) SUI	Saulo Decarli	13	1	10+1	1	2	0	0	0	0	0
44	DF	(Belgium) BEL	Brandon Mechele	48	5	40	3	5	2	2	0	1	0
55	DF	(Serbia) SRB	Erhan Mašović	0	0	0	0	0	0	0	0	0	0
96	DF	(Belgium) BEL	Ahmed Touba	5	0	2+1	0	0	0	1+1	0	0	0
Midfielders
3	MF	(Belgium) BEL	Timmy Simons	9	0	3+5	0	0	0	0	0	1	0
6	MF	(Netherlands) NED	Jordy Clasie	25	1	10+10	0	2+3	1	0	0	0	0
20	MF	(Belgium) BEL	Hans Vanaken	48	14	36+3	11	5	3	0+2	0	2	0
25	MF	(Netherlands) NED	Ruud Vormer	49	14	38+2	13	5	1	2	0	2	0
30	MF	(Zimbabwe) ZIM	Marvelous Nakamba	44	0	31+4	0	4+1	0	2	0	2	0
40	MF	(Belgium) BEL	Jordi Vanlerberghe	8	0	2+5	0	1	0	0	0	0	0
Forwards
7	FW	(Brazil) BRA	Wesley	44	13	29+9	11	3+2	2	0	0	0+1	0
8	FW	(Israel) ISR	Lior Refaelov	22	2	5+13	2	0	0	2	0	0+2	0
9	FW	(Belgium) BEL	Jelle Vossen	35	9	11+17	7	1+3	2	1	0	2	0
10	FW	(Mali) MLI	Abdoulay Diaby	41	16	26+8	15	4	1	0+1	0	1+1	0
11	FW	(Senegal) SEN	Krépin Diatta	8	0	6+2	0	0	0	0	0	0	0
17	FW	(Belgium) BEL	Anthony Limbombe	39	6	29+3	6	5	0	0	0	1+1	0
19	FW	(Belgium) BEL	Thibault Vlietinck	4	0	2+2	0	0	0	0	0	0	0
42	FW	(Nigeria) NGR	Emmanuel Dennis	38	12	12+18	7	1+3	4	2	1	2	0
Players who have made an appearance this season but have left the club
1	GK	(France) FRA	Ludovic Butelle	6	0	5	0	1	0	0	0	0	0
4	DF	(Belgium) BEL	Björn Engels	5	0	2	0	0	0	2	0	1	0
11	FW	(Colombia) COL	José Izquierdo	2	0	0	0	0	0	0	0	0+2	0
13	DF	(Colombia) COL	Helibelton Palacios	10	0	3+2	0	0+1	0	2	0	2	0
16	DF	(Colombia) COL	Germán Mera	2	0	1+1	0	0	0	0	0	0	0
28	DF	(Belgium) BEL	Laurens De Bock	8	0	4+2	0	0	0	1	0	1	0
43	FW	(France) FRA	Jérémy Perbet	1	0	0	0	0	0	1	0	0	0
