= Claudemir (footballer, born 1988) =

Brazilian footballer

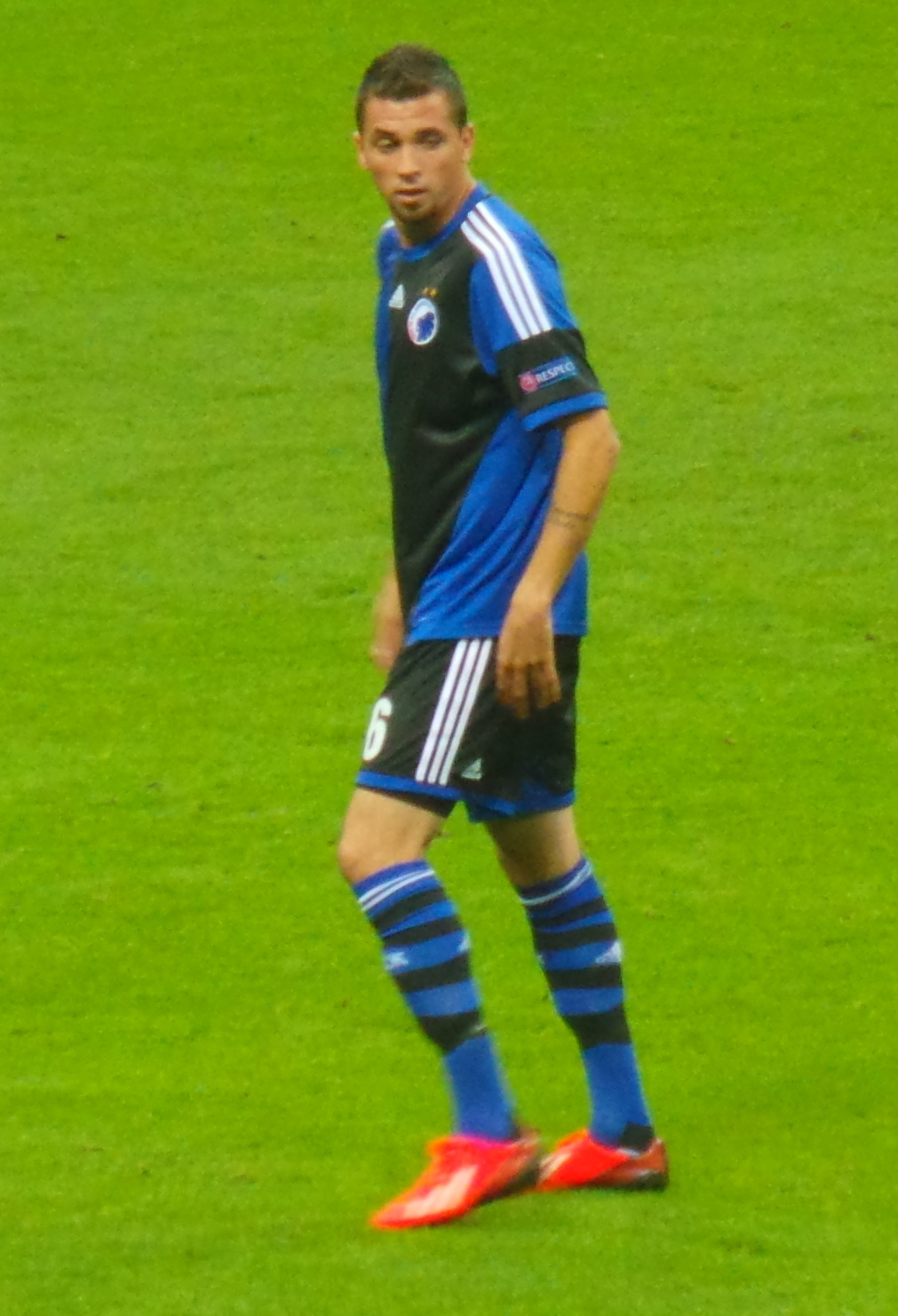
- Claudemir playing for Copenhagen

Personal information
- Full name: Claudemir Domingues de Souza
- Date of birth: 27 March 1988 (age 38)
- Place of birth: Macaúbas, Brazil
- Height: 1.85 m (6 ft 1 in)
- Position: Midfielder

Team information
- Current team: Comercial-SP
- Number: 22

Senior career*
Years	Team	Apps	(Gls)
2007	São Carlos		
2008–2010	Vitesse	76	(9)
2010–2015	Copenhagen	131	(10)
2015–2017	Club Brugge	70	(4)
2017–2018	Al-Ahli	20	(2)
2018–2020	Braga	35	(2)
2020–2021	Sivasspor	41	(0)
2021–2023	Vizela	48	(0)
2023–2024	Slaven Belupo	0	(0)
2024–	Comercial-SP	7	(1)
- * Club domestic league appearances and goals as of 3 March 2024

Claudemir Domingues de Souza (born 27 March 1988), commonly known as Claudemir, is a Brazilian professional footballer who plays as a midfielder for Comercial-SP.

== Career ==
Born in Macaúbas, Claudemir began his career with São Carlos, before joining Dutch club Vitesse in February 2008. He moved to Danish club Copenhagen in June 2010, and Belgian club Club Brugge in January 2015.

On 18 July 2017, Claudemir signed a two season-contract with Saudi club Al-Ahli.

After just one season in Saudi Arabia, he joined Portuguese side Braga. In January 2020 he moved from Braga to Turkish side Sivasspor.

On 27 July 2021 he joined Portuguese club Vizela.

On 30 August 2023, Claudemir signed a one-year contract with Croatian Football League club Slaven Belupo.

== Career statistics ==
As of 19 May 2023

Appearances and goals by club, season and competition
Club	Season	League			National Cup		League Cup		Continental		Other		Total	
Club	Season	Division	Apps	Goals	Apps	Goals	Apps	Goals	Apps	Goals	Apps	Goals	Apps	Goals
Vitesse	2007–08	Eredivisie	9	3	—		—		—		—		9	3
Vitesse	2008–09	Eredivisie	33	2	2	0	—		—		—		35	2
Vitesse	2009–10	Eredivisie	34	4	2	1	—		—		—		36	5
Vitesse	Total		76	9	4	1	—		—		—		81	10
Copenhagen	2010–11	Danish Superliga	32	4	1	0	—		12	1	—		45	5
Copenhagen	2011–12	Danish Superliga	24	2	4	1	—		7	0	—		35	3
Copenhagen	2013–14	Danish Superliga	31	2	1	0	—		10	1	—		42	3
Copenhagen	2013–14	Danish Superliga	30	1	4	0	—		6	1	—		40	2
Copenhagen	2014–15	Danish Superliga	14	1	1	0	—		7	0	—		22	1
Copenhagen	Total		131	10	11	1	—		42	3	—		184	14
Club Brugge	2014–15	Belgian First Division A	11	1	3	0	—		—		—		14	1
Club Brugge	2015–16	Belgian First Division A	26	2	2	0	—		5	0	0	0	33	2
Club Brugge	2016–17	Belgian First Division A	33	1	2	0	—		5	0	1	0	41	1
Club Brugge	Total		70	4	7	0	—		10	0	1	0	88	4
Al-Ahli	2017–18	Saudi Pro League	20	2	1	0	—		9	1	—		30	3
Braga	2018–19	Primeira Liga	30	2	4	0	3	0	1	0	—		38	2
Braga	2019–20	Primeira Liga	5	0	1	0	1	0	0	0	—		7	0
Braga	Total		35	2	5	0	4	0	1	0	—		45	2
Sivasspor	2019–20	Süper Lig	11	0	1	0	—		—		—		12	0
Sivasspor	2020–21	Süper Lig	30	0	0	0	—		6	0	—		36	0
Sivasspor	Total		41	0	1	0	—		6	0	—		48	0
Vizela	2021–22	Primeira Liga	26	0	0	0	—		—		—		26	0
Vizela	2022–23	Primeira Liga	22	0	1	0	3	0	—		—		26	0
Vizela	Total		48	0	1	0	3	0	—		—		52	0
Career total			421	27	30	2	7	0	58	4	1	0	517	33

== Honours ==
FC Copenhagen

- Danish Superliga: 2010–11, 2012–13
- Danish Cup: 2011–12

Club Brugge

- Belgian First Division: 2015–16
- Belgian Cup: 2014–15
- Belgian Supercup: 2016
