= Elohim Rolland =

French footballer (born 1989)

Personal information
- Full name: Elohim Rolland
- Date of birth: 3 March 1989 (age 37)
- Place of birth: Chamonix, France
- Height: 1.83 m (6 ft 0 in)
- Position: Midfielder

Team information
- Current team: FC Bondues
- Number: 8

Youth career
- 1999–2010: Nîmes

Senior career*
Years	Team	Apps	(Gls)
2009–2010	Nîmes B	1	(0)
2010–2011	Villefranche	17	(1)
2011–2014	AS Lyon-Duchère	59	(11)
2014–2015	Boulogne	29	(5)
2015–2020	Kortrijk	89	(9)
2021	Olympique Marcquois		
2021–	FC Bondues		
- * Club domestic league appearances and goals as of 3 September 2017

Elohim Rolland (born 3 March 1989) is a French footballer who plays as a midfielder. He is currently playing for [Le Touquet AC] in France.

== Personal life ==
Rolland was born in Chamonix, France, and is of Algerian descent.

== Career ==
In July 2021, Rolland joined Olympique Marcquois. Already in October 2021, he moved to FC Bondues.
