= Ricardo van Rhijn =

Dutch footballer (born 1991)

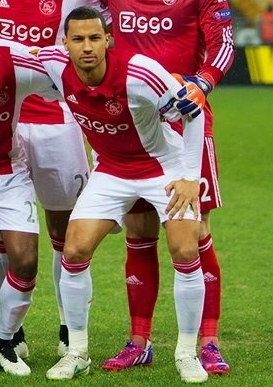
- Van Rhijn lining up for Ajax in 2015

Personal information
- Date of birth: 13 June 1991 (age 35)
- Place of birth: Leiden, Netherlands
- Height: 1.83 m (6 ft 0 in)
- Position: Right-back

Team information
- Current team: AFC
- Number: 23

Youth career
- 1996–2002: RKSV DoCoS
- 2002–2011: Ajax

Senior career*
Years	Team	Apps	(Gls)
2011–2016	Ajax	117	(4)
2014–2016	Jong Ajax	6	(1)
2016–2018	Club Brugge	15	(2)
2017–2018	→ AZ (loan)	11	(0)
2017–2018	→ Jong AZ (loan)	8	(0)
2018–2019	AZ	14	(1)
2019–2020	Heerenveen	19	(0)
2020–2021	Emmen	15	(0)
2021–2022	Karlsruher SC	16	(0)
2023–2024	Lisse	17	(0)
2024–	AFC	33	(0)

International career
2005–2006	Netherlands U15	3	(0)
2006–2007	Netherlands U16	6	(0)
2007–2008	Netherlands U17	13	(1)
2009	Netherlands U18	2	(0)
2009–2010	Netherlands U19	14	(0)
2012	Netherlands U20	1	(1)
2011–2013	Netherlands U21	9	(0)
2012–2014	Netherlands	8	(0)
- * Club domestic league appearances and goals as of 12:06, 14 November 2025 (UTC)

Ricardo van Rhijn (born 13 June 1991) is a Dutch professional footballer who plays as a right-back for Tweede Divisie club AFC.

== Club career ==
=== Early career ===
Born to an Antillean mother and a Dutch father, Van Rhijn began his football career at RKSV DoCoS, where he left a lasting impression as a central defender on the DoCoS sportspark. In 2002, at age 12, Van Rhijn transferred to the youth squad of Ajax, turning down offers from other clubs, such as ADO Den Haag and Feyenoord.

=== Ajax ===
Three years after transferring to the Amsterdam-based club, Van Rhijn began playing for the Ajax B1 team in the youth ranks, winning the national championship under coach Robin Pronk. After this successful season, Van Rhijn was offered his first contract, moving up to the Ajax A1 selection—skipping past the Ajax B1 selection, which is the usual next step—and signing a three-year contract.

Under then-youth coach Frank de Boer, Van Rhijn enjoyed two successful seasons with Ajax A1, defending alongside Timothy van der Meulen in his first year and Bryan Ottenhoff the following season. This led to a contract extension for one additional year. On 21 September 2011, Van Rhijn made his debut for the senior squad in a KNVB Cup match against VV Noordwijk, helping his side to a 3–1 away win after coming on as a substitute for Toby Alderweireld in the 65th minute.

On 18 December 2011, Van Rhijn made his first team debut in the Eredivisie, against ADO Den Haag. The match ended in a 4–0 win for Ajax at the Amsterdam Arena, which saw Van Rhijn playing the full 90 minutes in place of Alderweireld, who was sidelined due to an injury. Moving from the centre back role to the right back position, Ajax has used Van Rhijn extensively as a replacement for an injured Gregory van der Wiel. The 2012–13 season saw Van Rhijn becoming the first-choice right back under manager Frank de Boer following the departure of Van der Wiel. Van Rhijn scored his first official goal for Ajax in a UEFA Europa League home match against Steaua București in the round of 32 on 14 February 2013. The match ended in a 2–0 home win for Ajax, with Van Rhijn scoring in the 48th minute.

Van Rhijn would score his first Eredivisie goal the following season on 2 August 2013 in the season opener against Roda JC at home, scoring the opening goal in the ninth minute in the 3–0 win. The following match day would see Van Rhijn receive a red card for a challenge against AZ defender Nick Viergever in a 3–2 away loss, resulting in his suspension for the Klassieker against Feyenoord on 17 August 2013. On 14 September 2013, Van Rhijn competed in his 50th Eredivisie match in Ajax's 2–1 home win against PEC Zwolle. On 16 March 2014, he became the 151st Ajax player to be inducted into the club's illustrious Club van 100 after making his 100th appearance for the side in its 0–0 away draw against NAC Breda.

=== Club Brugge ===
On 20 July 2016, van Rhijn transferred to Club Brugge KV in Belgium's Jupiler Pro League for €1.8 million. He scored his first goal for the club on 2 October 2016 on a free kick against KAA Gent.

==== AZ (loan) ====
On 30 August 2017 it was announced that Van Rhijn would serve a season long loan spell with Dutch Eredivisie club AZ Alkmaar.

=== Heerenveen ===
He moved to sc Heerenveen in July 2019.

=== Emmen ===
He moved to FC Emmen in October 2020.

=== Karlsruher SC ===
On 19 October 2021, it was announced that Van Rhijn had signed a two-year contract with German 2. Bundesliga side Karlsruher SC.

== International career ==
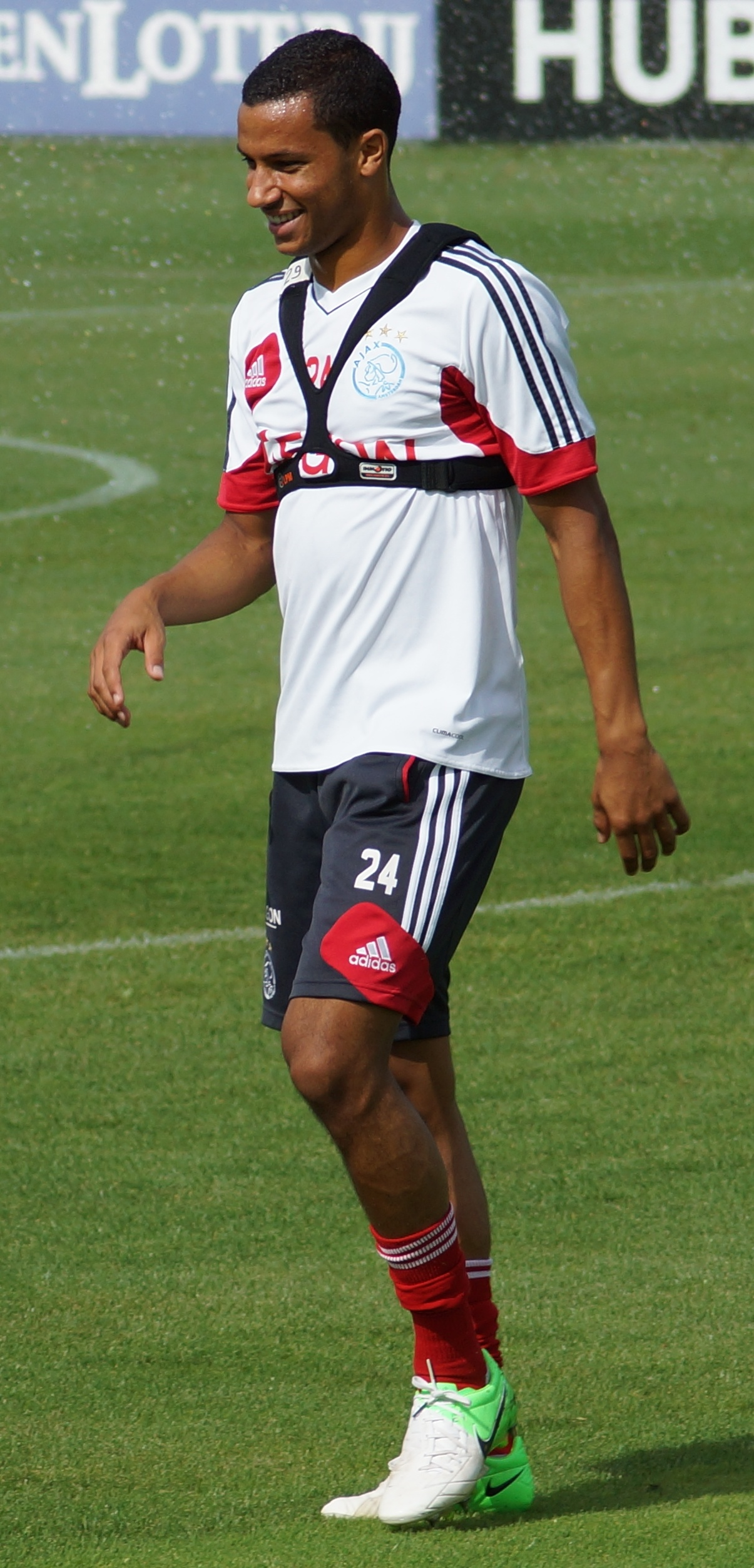
Van Rhijn training with Ajax in August 2012

=== Netherlands youth teams ===
Van Rhijn received his first international call-up for the Netherlands for the under-15 squad under then-coach Wim van Zwam. He made his debut on 6 December 2005 for the Netherlands U-15 in a friendly match against Ireland, which ended in a 3–1 win, making a total of three appearances for the under-15 side. He made his first appearance for the Netherlands U-16 team under coach Ruud Dokter on 14 November 2006 in a 0–0 draw against Ukraine, making a total of six appearances altogether.

Van Rhijn debuted for the under-17 squad under head coach Albert Stuivenberg on 20 September 2007 in a 2–0 loss against Germany at the U17 Four Nations Tournament in the Czech Republic, where he captained his side. He made a total of 13 appearances for the U17 squad, also competing in the 2008 UEFA European Under-17 Championship in Turkey where he captained the Dutch to the semi-finals, where they lost to the eventual champions Spain. Van Rhijn scored his first goal for the Netherlands during this tournament, scoring in the group stage 2–0 victory over Scotland. Making a total of two appearances for the Netherlands U-18 squad under coach Kees Zwamborn, he made his debut in a 2–1 loss to Luxembourg U-18 on 11 February 2009.

With Wim van Zwam taking over as head coach for the under-19 team, Van Rhijn made his first appearance at the U19 Four Nations Tournament in Ireland, drawing 1–1 against the host nation. He played an instrumental role in the qualification process, as well as in the main tournament of the 2010 UEFA European Under-19 Championship in France, making a total of 14 appearances for the U19s. While initially skipping the under-20 team and going straight to the under-21 selection, he was later called up for one appearance for the U20 side under head coach Adrie Koster on 29 February 2012 in a friendly match against Denmark that ended in a 3–0 win for the Dutch, with Van Rhijn scoring the final goal. He made his first appearance for the under-21 team, however, one year prior on 27 May 2011 in a friendly match against Israel, a 2–0 win. He competed in the qualifications for the 2013 UEFA European Under-21 Championship under head coach Cor Pot, participating in the main tournament in Israel as well, where the Dutch were eliminated in the semi-finals by Italy. All together, Van Rhijn made nine appearances for the Dutch under-21 side.

=== Netherlands first team ===
Van Rhijn received his first call up for the Netherlands senior team under manager Louis van Gaal, replacing his teammate Gregory van der Wiel as the first choice at right back against Belgium in a 4–2 friendly defeat on 15 August 2012. He was previously able to impress the head coach due to his high performance while playing for Ajax in a period when Van der Wiel was sidelined due to an injury. Fellow Dutch international players Stefan de Vrij, Nick Viergever, Bruno Martins Indi and Adam Maher all made their debut for the first team in that same fixture. In August 2013, Van Rhijn was called up once more ahead of a friendly match against Portugal, and although he was initially not selected for the final squad ahead of the fixture. He was later added to the section to replace injured Daryl Janmaat instead, and joined the team at their training camp in Noordwijk on 11 August. Previously on that same day, he was substituted off the pitch in a match against AZ due to the call-up for the national team.

== Career statistics ==
=== Club ===
As of match played 7 March 2020

Appearances and goals by club, season and competition
Club	Season	League			Cup		Continental		Other		Total	
Club	Season	Division	Apps	Goals	Apps	Goals	Apps	Goals	Apps	Goals	Apps	Goals
Ajax	2011–12	Eredivisie	14	0	1	0	2 (Note: Appearances in the Europa League)	0	0	0	17	0
Ajax	2012–13	Eredivisie	31	0	4	0	8 (Note: Two appearances in the Europa League and six in the Champions League)	1	1 (Note: Appearances in the Johan Cruyff Shield)	0	44	1
Ajax	2013–14	Eredivisie	32	2	5	1	8	0	1	0	46	3
Ajax	2014–15	Eredivisie	28	2	2	0	10 (Note: Four appearances in the Europa League and six in the Champions League)	0	0	0	40	2
Ajax	2015–16	Eredivisie	12	0	1	0	3	0	0	0	16	0
Ajax	Total		117	4	13	1	31	1	2	0	163	6
Jong Ajax	2014–15	Eerste Divisie	1	0	–		–		–		1	0
Jong Ajax	2015–16	Eerste Divisie	5	1	–		–		–		5	1
Jong Ajax	Total		6	1	0	0	0	0	0	0	6	1
Club Brugge	2016–17	Belgian First Division A	21	3	2	0	6 (Note: Appearances in the Champions League)	0	0	0	29	3
AZ Alkmaar (loan)	2017–18	Eredivisie	11	0	4	0	—		—		15	0
AZ Alkmaar	2018–19	Eredivisie	14	1	4	0	0	0	—		18	1
Heerenveen	2019–20	Eredivisie	19	0	4	0	—		—		23	0
Career total			182	8	27	1	37	1	2	0	248	10

=== International ===
As of matches played on 12 November 2014

Appearances and goals by national team and year
National team	Year	Apps	Goals
Netherlands	2012	5	0
Netherlands	2013	2	0
Netherlands	2014	1	0
Total		8	0

== Honours ==
Ajax

- Eredivisie: 2011–12, 2012–13, 2013–14
- Johan Cruijff Shield: 2013

Club Brugge

- Belgian Super Cup: 2016

Individual

- AFC Ajax Talent of the Year: 2011–12
