= Björn Engels =

Belgian footballer (born 1994)

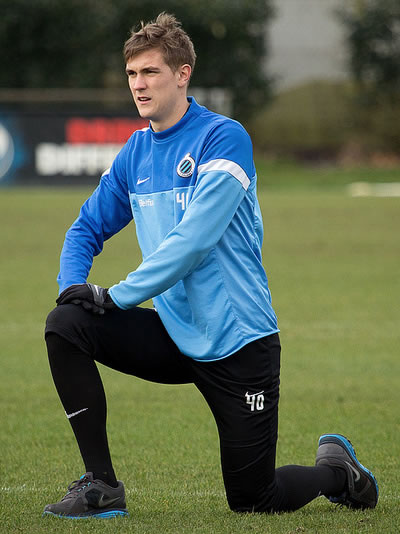
- Engels with Club Brugge

Personal information
- Full name: Björn Lionel G. Engels
- Date of birth: 15 September 1994 (age 32)
- Place of birth: Kaprijke, Belgium
- Height: 1.93 m (6 ft 4 in)
- Position: Centre-back

Youth career
- 2006–2013: Club Brugge

Senior career*
Years	Team	Apps	(Gls)
2012–2017	Club Brugge	57	(11)
2017–2019	Olympiacos	17	(3)
2018–2019	→ Reims (loan)	33	(1)
2019	Reims	0	(0)
2019–2021	Aston Villa	17	(1)
2021–2026	Royal Antwerp	16	(2)

International career^{‡}
2011	Belgium U17	1	(0)
2011	Belgium U18	1	(0)
2012	Belgium U19	5	(1)
2016	Belgium U21	2	(1)
- * Club domestic league appearances and goals as of 11:46, 13 December 2022 (UTC) ‡ National team caps and goals as of 18:46, 6 September 2016 (UTC)

Björn Lionel G. Engels (born 15 September 1994) is a Belgian professional footballer who plays as a centre-back.

== Club career ==
=== Club Brugge ===
Born in Kaprijke, Belgium, Engels first played for FC Kaprijke-Bentille, FC Lembeke and Lokeren as a youth. In 2006, at the age of 12, he joined Club Brugge.

After progressing through the ranks of the academy, Engels appeared as an unused substitute, in a match against Gent on 29 October 2011, which saw Club Brugge win 5–4. On 20 September 2012, he made his professional debut in the UEFA Europa League against Girondins de Bordeaux coming on at half-time for Thibaut Van Acker. Only one minute later he scored an own goal. After the match, Engels described his Club Brugge debut as "very painful". Having finished the 2012–13 season with one appearance, Engels signed his first professional contract with Club Brugge, agreeing a three–year deal.

Engels made his league debut on 4 August 2013 in the second game of the 2013–14 season against Oostende. He played the full game and scored the opening goal in the third minute. Club Brugge won the game with 2–1. After scoring his second against Kortrijk on 20 October 2013, Engels’ performance at the club earned him a contract extension in November 2013, which would keep him until 2017. Later in the 2013–14 season, Engels went on to score three more goals against Genk, Zulte Waregem and Lokeren. Despite being sidelined due to injury and suspension, he continued to be a first team regular and finished the 2013–14 season with 35 appearances and 5 goals in all competitions. For his performances he was nominated for the Young Professional Footballer of the Year, but lost out to Youri Tielemans.

After missing out the opening game of the 2014–15 season, due to an injury, Engels managed to regain his first team position making his first appearance of the season against Brøndby. He then scored against Anderlecht on 31 August 2014 and a brace against Oostende on 28 September 2014. In the next match against Standard Liège on 5 October 2014, which Club Brugge won 3–0, Engels suffered both a knee and an ankle injury despite playing the whole game. Initially out between three and six weeks, Engels’ recovery was delayed throughout 2014. While recovering from both injuries, Engels signed a contract extension until 2019 in January 2015. In March, a scan revealed Engels’ recovery would be delayed again and he would be out for the rest of the season. Engels finished the 2014–15 season making twelve appearances and scoring three times in all competitions while winning the Belgian Cup.

Ahead of the 2015–16 season, Engels appeared to have recovered from his injuries when he returned to training in the pre–season. However, at the start of the 2015–16 season, Engels’ hopes of returning suffered a setback when he was out for several months, delaying his return again following a scan. He returned to training from injury around October. On 10 December 2015, he made his first appearance in a year, coming on as a late substitute in a 1–1 draw against Midtjylland on matchday 6 of the UEFA Europa League Group stage. Engels then made his first league appearance in a year against Anderlecht on 20 December 2015, where he set up a goal for the club in a 4–1 loss. On 16 January 2016, Engels scored his first goal of the season, in a 3–0 win over Mouscron, followed up by scoring his second in the next game on 24 January 2016, in a 2–1 win over Waasland-Beveren. Despite suffering two separate injuries towards the end of the 2015–16 season, Engels helped the club win the league in the 2015–16 season, earning him the winner's medal, and made 21 appearances and scoring twice in all competitions.

Ahead of the 2016–17 season, Engels was linked a move away from Club Brugge, prompting a response from Filip Joos, who stated that Engels would be worth €60 million (in China). Engels remained at the club and signed a contract extension with the club, keeping him until 2020. After being left out of the squad for the first three matches at the start of the season, including Belgium Super Cup, he then scored his first goal of the season on 28 August 2016, in a 2–2 draw against Standard Liège. On 14 September 2016, he made his Champions League debut against Leicester City, earning a booking in the 35th minutes, in a 3–0 loss. During the match, Engels suffered a shoulder injury and was substituted in the 53rd minute. After the match, it was announced he would be sidelined for months with the injury. On 18 December 2016, he made his return from injury, making his first start in months, in a 5–1 win over Kortrijk. After returning to the first team, Engels regained his place for the rest of the season despite suffering from an abductor injury and appearing on the substitute bench. He later scored again on 24 February 2017, in a 5–0 win over Zulte Waregem. At the end of the 2016–17 season, Engels had scored twice in 23 appearances.

In the 2017–18 season, Engels continued to remain in the first team, making five appearances by the end of August.

=== Olympiacos ===
In the summer transfer window of 2017, Engels was linked with a move to English sides Arsenal, Fulham and Stoke City. Ultimately, Greek Super League side Olympiacos agreed with the player's side on 29 August 2017, while Club Brugge agreed on the transfer with Olympiacos for an estimated €7.1 million fee on 30 August 2017. The following day, on 31 August 2017, Olympiacos announced the signing of Engels. Upon joining Olympiacos, Engels said of the move, quoting: "this seems to me the perfect step in my career. Olympiakos is the most important team in Greece, and I'm very happy to be here." On 22 October 2017, Engels's goal earned the victory in the derby against rivals PAOK. Belgian centre-back struck six minutes after half-time, bundling the ball home after a Kostas Fortounis free-kick caused panic in the PAOK penalty box to win three vital points for the defending champions.

On summer 2018, after being told he was not part of new manager Pedro Martins's plans, Engels tried to find a new club to continue his career.

==== Loan to Reims ====
In August 2018, Engels joined Reims, newly promoted to Ligue 1 at the end of the 2017–18 season, on a season-long loan from Olympiacos. Engels performed solidly with Reims throughout the year, playing in 33 Ligue 1 games. Engels helped Reims rise to eighth position in the table.

=== Reims ===
On 28 March 2019, Reims announced they had triggered the option-to-buy clause in Engels’ contract for an estimated €4 million fee following a strong 2018–19 Ligue 1 campaign.

=== Aston Villa ===
On 16 July 2019, Engels signed for Premier League side Aston Villa for an estimated €8 million fee. Reims' director-general Mathieu Lacour and president Jean-Pierre Caillot described that Engels' short time with the club was due to an agreement to allow him to join any Premier League club that made a considerable offer. Engels made his debut on the first day of the 2019–20 season, in a 3–1 away defeat to Tottenham Hotspur. On 16 February 2020, he scored his first goal for Aston Villa in a 3–2 home defeat, also to Tottenham Hotspur, a game in which he also made a mistake in injury time to allow Son Heung-min to score the winning goal.

Engels missed the end of the season and the start of the following after suffering a serious thigh injury in a behind-closed-doors training match. He was in contention for a start once again in early 2021, but did not receive any playing time, as he had fallen behind Ezri Konsa, Tyrone Mings and Kortney Hause in the pecking order.

=== Royal Antwerp ===
On 18 June 2021, Aston Villa announced that a transfer had been agreed for Engels to return to Belgium and join Royal Antwerp.

== International career ==
After going through the ranks of Belgium U17, Belgium U18 and Belgium U19, Engels received his first call up to the senior Belgium squad in March 2016 for a friendly against Portugal, but didn't play. Two months later, Engels was again called up for the senior Belgium squad ahead of the Euro 2016 tournament. However, Engels suffered a thigh injury that ruled him out of the tournament.

After being left out the senior squad, Engels was called up by the Belgium U21 for the first time on 26 August 2016 and made his Belgium U21 debut on 2 September 2016 against Malta U21, scoring a winning goal, in a 3–2 win.

== Personal life ==
Engels has a brother named Manice. He is in a relationship with his partner, Evangalista from Liverpool, whom he has been dating since 2012. The couple have a son born in July 2017.

== Career statistics ==
=== Club ===
As of match played 5 February 2022

Appearances and goals by club, season and competition
Club	Season	League			National cup (Note: Includes Belgian Cup, Greek Football Cup, Coupe de France, FA Cup)		League cup (Note: Includes EFL Cup)		Europe		Other		Total	
Club	Season	Division	Apps	Goals	Apps	Goals	Apps	Goals	Apps	Goals	Apps	Goals	Apps	Goals
Club Brugge	2012–13	Belgian Pro League	0	0	0	0	—		1 (Note: Appearance(s) in UEFA Europa League)	0	0	0	1	0
Club Brugge	2013–14	Belgian Pro League	23	4	2	0	—		0	0	10 (Note: Appearances in Pro League playoffs)	1	35	5
Club Brugge	2014–15	Belgian Pro League	7	3	1	0	—		4	0	0	0	12	3
Club Brugge	2015–16	Belgian Pro League	10	2	4	0	—		1	0	6	0	21	2
Club Brugge	2016–17	Belgian Pro League	15	2	0	0	—		1 (Note: Appearance(s) in UEFA Champions League)	0	7	0	23	2
Club Brugge	2017–18	Belgian Pro League	2	0	0	0	—		3	0	0	0	5	0
Club Brugge	Total		57	11	7	0	—		10	0	23	1	97	12
Olympiacos	2017–18	Super League Greece	17	3	2	0	—		5	0	–		24	2
Reims	2018–19	Ligue 1	33	1	2	0	0	0	0	0	—		35	1
Aston Villa	2019–20	Premier League	17	1	1	0	1	0	—		—		19	1
Aston Villa	2020–21	Premier League	0	0	0	0	0	0	—		—		0	0
Aston Villa	Total		17	1	1	0	1	0	—		—		19	1
Royal Antwerp	2021–22	Belgian Pro League	16	2	1	0	—		3	0	0	0	20	2
Royal Antwerp	2022–23	Belgian Pro League	0	0	0	0	—		0	0	0	0	0	0
Royal Antwerp	2023–24	Belgian Pro League	0	0	0	0	—		0	0	0	0	0	0
Royal Antwerp	Total		16	2	1	0	—		3	0	0	0	20	2
Career total			140	18	13	0	1	0	18	0	23	1	195	19

== Honours ==
Club Brugge

- Belgian Pro League: 2015–16
- Belgian Cup: 2014–15
- Belgian Super Cup: 2016

Aston Villa

- EFL Cup runner-up: 2019–20

Antwerp

- Belgian Cup: 2022–23
