= Ruud Vormer =

Dutch footballer (born 1988)

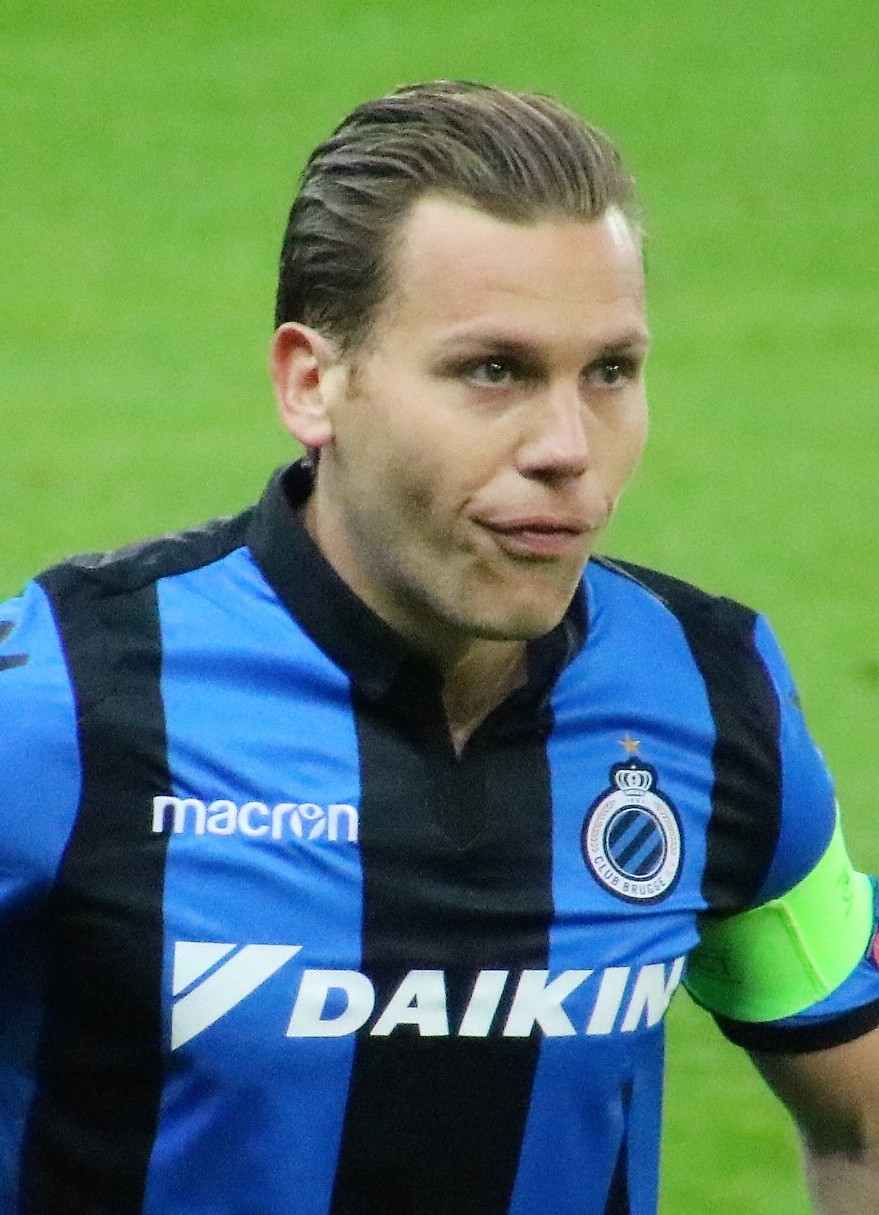
- Vormer playing for Club Brugge in 2019

Personal information
- Full name: Rudy Willem Vormer
- Date of birth: 11 May 1988 (age 38)
- Place of birth: Hoorn, Netherlands
- Height: 1.78 m (5 ft 10 in)
- Position: Central midfielder

Team information
- Current team: Zulte Waregem
- Number: 25

Youth career
- 1994-1998: Hollandia
- 1994-1998: VV De Blokkers
- 2000-2006: AZ

Senior career*
Years	Team	Apps	(Gls)
2007–2008	AZ	19	(0)
2008–2012	Roda JC	120	(9)
2012–2014	Feyenoord	39	(3)
2014–2023	Club Brugge	254	(52)
2023	→ Zulte Waregem (loan)	10	(1)
2023–2024	Zulte Waregem	24	(3)
Total		466	(68)

International career^{‡}
2018	Netherlands	4	(0)

Managerial career
- 2026–: Royal Knokke FC
- * Club domestic league appearances and goals as of 2 May 2024 ‡ National team caps and goals as of 9 September 2018

Ruud Vormer (born 11 May 1988) is a Dutch former professional footballer who played as a central midfielder, most notably for Club Brugge. He is currently the manager of Royal Knokke FC.

== Club career ==
=== Early career ===
As a youngster, Vormer played for two amateur clubs from his hometown of Hoorn, Hollandia and De Blokkers. Although he attracted interest from other Dutch clubs, he transferred to AZ in February 2000.

Vormer was promoted to the AZ first team in 2006 and made his debut for the club aged 18. However, did not consistently play and was not given a new contract by AZ, so two years later he joined Roda JC on a free transfer. At Kerkrade, he soon became an important player, making the Roda JC team of the season in 2011-12. He then joined Feyenoord on a free transfer in the summer of 2012, after rejecting a three year extension from Roda JC. However, Vormer struggled for regular gametime at the Rotterdam club, and told Feyenoord he was open to a transfer.

=== Club Brugge ===
Vormer joined Belgian side Club Brugge on 1 September 2014 on a three-year deal.

Vormer was named Club Brugge's player of the season during the 2015–16 campaign, featuring in 3,547 minutes or 69.1% of the club's play, and also contributed with seven goals and added a further six assists.

On 24 February 2017, Vormer scored twice in a 5–0 win over Zulte Waregem. He would go on to win the Belgian Golden Shoe in 2017. Vormer followed this up with a career best 13 league goals in the 2017–18 season, helping Club Brugge to a 15th Belgian First Division title. On 22 July 2018, Vormer signed a new contract with Club Brugge, keeping him at the club until 2022.

Vormer continued being an influential member for Club Brugge, contributing to their 17th league title success during the 2020–21 season and was named the club's player of the month for March 2021. Vormer signed a one-year contract extension on 14 June 2021, keeping him at the club until 2023.

=== Zulte Waregem ===
On 3 January 2023, Vormer officially joined fellow Belgian side Zulte Waregem on a loan until the end of the season, with the deal set to become permanent once his contract with Club Brugge would expire. As Zulte Waregem relegated at the end of that season, Vormer was a free agent. Despite him having indicated upon his initial arrival that he would not stay with the club in case of relegation, Zulte Waregem was able to convince Vormer of signing a two-year deal on 30 May 2023. Despite this, Vormer announced his retirement a year later in 2024.

== Managerial career ==
After retiring from playing football, Vormer became a youth coach at Royal Knokke FC. in May 2026, it was announced he would be the team's new head coach.

== International career ==
Vormer made his debut for the Netherlands national team in a 1–1 draw with Slovakia on 31 May 2018, coming on at half-time for Donny van de Beek.

== Career statistics ==
As of match played 2 May 2024

Appearances and goals by club, season and competition
Club	Season	League			National cup (Note: Includes KNVB Cup, Belgian Cup)		Europe		Other		Total	
Club	Season	Division	Apps	Goals	Apps	Goals	Apps	Goals	Apps	Goals	Apps	Goals
AZ	2006–07	Eredivisie	3	0	0	0	1 (Note: Appearances in UEFA Europa League)	0	0	0	4	0
AZ	2007–08	Eredivisie	16	0	0	0	1	0	—		17	0
AZ	Total		19	0	0	0	2	0	0	0	21	0
Roda JC Kerkrade	2008–09	Eredivisie	28	0	2	0	—		2 (Note: Appearances in Eredivisie playoffs)	0	32	0
Roda JC Kerkrade	2009–10	Eredivisie	30	1	2	0	—		4	0	36	1
Roda JC Kerkrade	2010–11	Eredivisie	33	3	3	1	—		—		36	4
Roda JC Kerkrade	2011–12	Eredivisie	29	5	2	1	—		—		31	6
Roda JC Kerkrade	Total		120	9	9	2	0	0	6	0	135	11
Feyenoord	2012–13	Eredivisie	20	0	4	1	4 (Note: Two appearances in UEFA Champions League, two appearances in UEFA Europa League)	0	—		28	1
Feyenoord	2013–14	Eredivisie	17	3	3	0	2	0	—		22	3
Feyenoord	2014–15	Eredivisie	2	0	—		1	0	—		3	0
Feyenoord	Total		39	3	7	1	7	0	0	0	53	4
Club Brugge	2014–15	Belgian Pro League	29	7	6	0	10	1	—		45	8
Club Brugge	2015–16	Belgian Pro League	28	7	5	0	8 (Note: Four appearances in UEFA Champions League, four appearances in UEFA Europa League)	0	1 (Note: Appearance in Belgian Super Cup)	0	42	7
Club Brugge	2016–17	Belgian Pro League	38	9	2	1	5 (Note: Appearances in UEFA Champions League)	0	1	1	46	11
Club Brugge	2017–18	Belgian First Division A	40	13	5	1	4 (Note: Two appearances in UEFA Champions League, two appearances in UEFA Europa League)	0	0	0	49	14
Club Brugge	2018–19	Belgian First Division A	38	6	0	0	8 (Note: Six appearances and one goal in UEFA Champions League, two appearances in UEFA Europa League)	1	1	0	46	7
Club Brugge	2019–20	Belgian First Division A	27	1	4	1	8 (Note: Seven appearances and one goal in UEFA Champions League, one appearance in UEFA Europa League)	1	0	0	39	3
Club Brugge	2020–21	Belgian First Division A	23	4	1	1	7 (Note: Six appearances and one goal in UEFA Champions League, one appearance in UEFA Europa League)	1	—		31	6
Club Brugge	2021–22	Belgian First Division A	29	5	3	0	4	0	—		36	5
Club Brugge	2022–23	Belgian First Division A	2	0	0	0	0	0	1	0	3	0
Club Brugge	Total		254	52	26	4	54	4	4	1	337	61
Zulte Waregem (loan)	2022–23	Belgian Pro League	10	1	2	0	—		—		12	1
Zulte Waregem	2023–24	Challenger Pro League	24	3	3	0	—		—		27	3
Career total			466	68	42	7	63	4	10	1	577	80

== Honours ==
Club Brugge

- Belgian Pro League: 2015–16, 2017–18, 2019–20, 2020–21, 2021–22
- Belgian Cup: 2014–15
- Belgian Super Cup: 2016, 2018, 2021, 2022

Individual

- Belgian Golden Shoe: 2017
- Club Brugge Player of the Season: 2015–16, 2016–17
- Belgian Pro League top assist provider: 2017–18, 2019–20
