= Child marriage in Zimbabwe =

Child marriage in Zimbabwe is common. As of 2019, approximately 1 in 3 girls in Zimbabwe are married before age 18.

Early pregnancy can pose a health risk. In July 2021, a 15-year-old girl, who was married to a 26-year-old man, died giving birth inside a church.

== 2016 key indicators of child marriage in Zimbabwe ==
Indicator	Gender/current age	Percentage
Marriage or union before age 15	Women aged 15–49 years Men aged 15–49 years Men aged 15–54 years	5.0% 0.3% 0.3%
Marriage or union before age of 18	Women aged 20–49 years Men aged 20–49 years Men aged 20–54 years	32.8% 3.7% 3.9%
Young people age 15–19 years currently married or in union	Women; Men	24.5% 1.7%
In a polygynous union	Women aged 15–49 years Men aged 15–49 years Men aged 15–54 years	10.1% 3.8% 4.1%
Spousal age difference	Young women married or in union and whose spouse is 10 or more years older: among women aged 15–19 years among women aged 20-24 years	19.9% 17.5%
