= Stefano Denswil =

Surinamese footballer (born 1993)

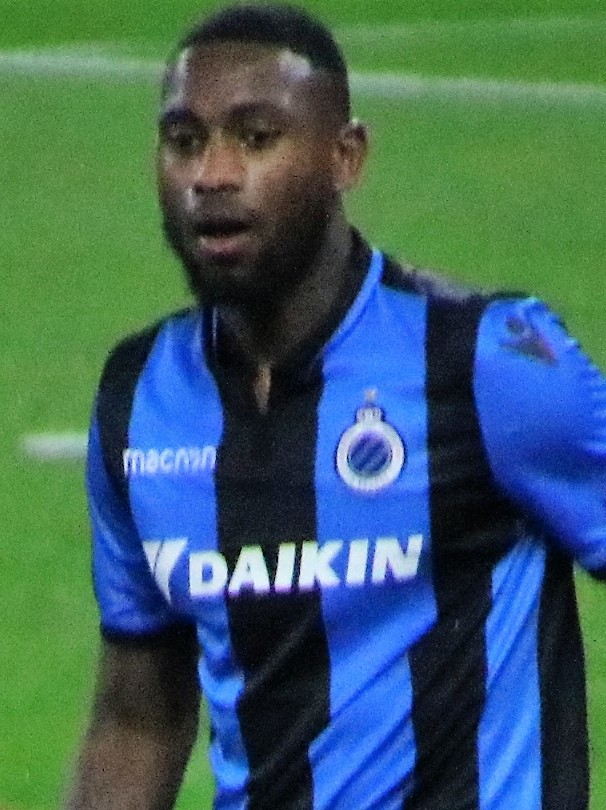
- Denswil in with Club Brugge in 2019

Personal information
- Full name: Stefano Wilfred Denswil
- Date of birth: 7 May 1993 (age 33)
- Place of birth: Zaandam, Netherlands
- Height: 1.88 m (6 ft 2 in)
- Position: Centre-back

Team information
- Current team: AEL Limassol
- Number: 4

Youth career
- –2001: Hellas Sport
- 2001–2012: Ajax

Senior career*
| Years | Team | Apps | (Gls) |
| 2012–2015 | Ajax | 22 | (1) |
| 2015–2019 | Club Brugge | 144 | (6) |
| 2019–2022 | Bologna | 31 | (0) |
| 2021 | → Club Brugge (loan) | 12 | (0) |
| 2021–2022 | → Trabzonspor (loan) | 28 | (0) |
| 2022–2025 | Trabzonspor | 82 | (3) |
| 2025–2026 | Kayserispor | 31 | (1) |
| 2026– | AEL Limassol | 3 | (0) |

International career^{‡}
| 2007–2008 | Netherlands U15 | 5 | (0) |
| 2009 | Netherlands U16 | 2 | (0) |
| 2009–2010 | Netherlands U17 | 11 | (0) |
| 2010 | Netherlands U18 | 1 | (0) |
| 2011–2012 | Netherlands U19 | 6 | (0) |
| 2012–2013 | Netherlands U20 | 4 | (1) |
| 2013 | Netherlands U21 | 7 | (0) |
| 2023– | Suriname | 15 | (0) |
- * Club domestic league appearances and goals as of 18 September 2026 ‡ National team caps and goals as of 26 March 2026

Stefano Wilfred Denswil (born 7 May 1993) is a professional footballer who plays as a centre-back for Cypriot First Division club AEL Limassol. Born in the Netherlands, he plays for the Suriname national team.

== Club career ==
=== Ajax ===
Denswil began his footballing career with local amateur side Hellas Sport in Zaandam, before being recruited to join the youth ranks of Ajax in 2001. In the 2011–12 season, Denswil helped the Ajax A1 team win the Nike Eredivisie league title as well as reach the finals of the NextGen Series, the Champions League equivalent for under-20 youth squads. Ajax lost the final to Inter Milan 5–3 on penalties, following a 1–1 draw after extra time. Denswil scored the only goal in regular time from a free kick in the 48th minute, with his team finishing the tournament as runners-up.

Denswil was promoted to the first team squad and was given the number 34 shirt by manager Frank de Boer in the 2012–13 season. He made his debut for the first team in the third round of the KNVB Cup against ONS Sneek on 31 October 2012. It was an away match the Amsterdam side won 2–0, with Denswil scoring off a free kick in the 88th minute. On 3 November 2012, he made his league debut in the home fixture against SBV Vitesse, starting as left center back in place of Niklas Moisander, who was side-lined due to a red card from the club's previous fixture against Feyenoord.

On 18 September 2013, Denswil made his continental debut for the Ajax during the group stage of the 2013–14 UEFA Champions League campaign in the 4–0 away loss to Barcelona, in which he formed a central defensive partnership with Niklas Moisander. On 2 October 2013 he made his second appearance in the Champions League group stage against AC Milan. Denswil scored through a header in the 90th minute but his goal would not be decisive as Mario Balotelli converted a penalty in the 94th minute of a 1–1 draw. Following the match against AC Milan, it was announced on 5 October 2013, that Denswil had been included in the official UEFA Champions League Team of the Week, finding himself mentioned amongst the likes of Mesut Özil, Arjen Robben as well as former Ajax players Gregory van der Wiel and Zlatan Ibrahimović.

=== Club Brugge ===
On 3 January 2015, it was announced that Stefano Denswil would transfer to Belgian Pro League side Club Brugge, signing a 3.5-year contract with the Belgian club. He made his league debut on 16 January 2015 in a 1–1 draw against KV Mechelen. On 3 February 2015, Denswil played his first Bruges derby against crosstown rivals Cercle Brugge, playing the full 90-minutes in the 5–1 win at home.

=== Bologna ===
On 6 July 2019, Denswill signed for Italian club Bologna on a three-year contract with the option of a further year.

==== Loan return to Club Brugge ====
On 7 January 2021, Denswil returned to Club Brugge on loan for the remainder of the season.

=== Trabzonspor ===
On 21 August 2021, Denswil was loaned to Trabzonspor for the duration of the 2021–22 Süper Lig season. On 16 June 2022, Denswil announced a signing of a three-year contract with Trabzonspor.

=== Kayserispor ===
In August 2025, Denswil moved to Central Anatolian side Kayserispor, signing a one-year contract.

== International career ==
Denswil was born in the Netherlands to Surinamese parents. He has represented the Netherlands, his country of birth on various youth levels, making his debut for the Netherlands U-15 team in a friendly match against Slovakia on 27 November 2007. That season, Denswil went on to appear in three more friendly fixtures for the U-15 team, once against Belgium and twice against Switzerland. On 10 February 2009, he made his debut for the Netherlands U-16 team in a friendly match against Ukraine, which ended in a 3–1 victory for the Dutch. He made his second appearance two days later in another friendly fixture against Ukraine in a 2–0 victory.

Denswil made his debut for the U-17 team in a friendly match against France on 22 September 2009. He made a total of six appearances in 2010 UEFA European Under-17 Championship campaign and also competed in the La Manga Cup in Murcia, Spain. On 17 November 2010, he made his debut for the under-18 team against Romania, in a match that ended in a 3–0 away win for the Netherlands. On 9 February 2011, he debuted for the U-19 team in a friendly match against France. He also played in the 2011 UEFA European Under-19 Championship qualification matches against Israel and the Czech Republic, making a total of six appearances while also appearing in four friendly matches for the under-19 team that season.

Denswil switched sporting nationalities to play for the Suriname national team in May 2023.

== Personal life ==
=== Kickboxing ===
Outside of football, Denswil has actively pursued his passion for kickboxing. The intensity of his practice has slowed down immensely in order to avoid unnecessary injuries as he progressed through the youth ranks of Ajax. However Denswil still practices on a regular basis in order to sharpen his condition and footwork. His shared passion of both football and martial arts were revealed in a Voetbal International report where the magazine took a closer look at Denswil.

=== Instagram incident ===
On 15 July 2013, a naked photograph of Denswil with a girl appeared on the website Instagram. The photo had been taken by the girl who, after having slept with Denswil, uploaded the picture to the site with the tagline "Lekker ploppen met Stefano Denswil". Although the photograph was removed from the site the same day, the picture appeared on several websites shortly thereafter, eventually making headlines in the Netherlands. Ajax manager Frank de Boer was not amused by the incident but acknowledged that there was little Denswil could have done to prevent it from happening, and asked that he stay focused on his career and not let the incident be a distraction.

== Career statistics ==
As of match played 11 April 2026

Appearances and goals by club, season and competition
| Club | Season | League | | | National cup (Note: Includes KNVB Cup, Belgian Cup, Coppa Italia, Turkish Cup) | | Europe | | Other | | Total | |
| Club | Season | Division | Apps | Goals | Apps | Goals | Apps | Goals | Apps | Goals | Apps | Goals |
|---|---|---|---|---|---|---|---|---|---|---|---|---|
| Ajax | 2012–13 | Eredivisie | 4 | 0 | 1 | 1 | 0 | 0 | 0 | 0 | 5 | 1 |
| Ajax | 2013–14 | Eredivisie | 17 | 1 | 4 | 0 | 7 (Note: Six appearances, one goal in UEFA Champions League, one appearance in UEFA Europa League) | 1 | 0 | 0 | 28 | 2 |
| Ajax | 2014–15 | Eredivisie | 1 | 0 | 3 | 0 | 2 | 0 | 0 | 0 | 6 | 0 |
| Ajax | Total | | 22 | 1 | 8 | 1 | 9 | 1 | 0 | 0 | 39 | 3 |
| Jong Ajax | 2013–14 | Eerste Divisie | 9 | 1 | — | | — | | — | | 9 | 1 |
| Jong Ajax | 2014–15 | Eerste Divisie | 7 | 1 | — | | — | | — | | 7 | 1 |
| Jong Ajax | Total | | 16 | 2 | — | | — | | — | | 16 | 2 |
| Club Brugge | 2014–15 | Belgian Pro League | 11 | 0 | 2 | 0 | 0 | 0 | — | | 13 | 0 |
| Club Brugge | 2015–16 | Belgian Pro League | 26 | 2 | 3 | 1 | 4 (Note: Appearances in UEFA Europa League) | 0 | 1 (Note: Appearance in Belgian Super Cup) | 0 | 34 | 3 |
| Club Brugge | 2016–17 | Belgian Pro League | 39 | 1 | 1 | 0 | 5 (Note: Appearances in UEFA Champions League) | 0 | 1 | 0 | 46 | 1 |
| Club Brugge | 2017–18 | Belgian Pro League | 33 | 2 | 3 | 0 | 4 (Note: Two appearances and two goals in UEFA Champions League, two appearances in UEFA Europa League) | 2 | — | | 40 | 4 |
| Club Brugge | 2018–19 | Belgian Pro League | 35 | 1 | 0 | 0 | 8 (Note: Six appearances in UEFA Champions League, two appearances and one goal in UEFA Europa League) | 1 | 1 | 0 | 44 | 2 |
| Club Brugge | Total | | 144 | 6 | 9 | 1 | 21 | 3 | 3 | 0 | 177 | 10 |
| Bologna | 2019–20 | Serie A | 26 | 0 | 2 | 0 | — | | — | | 28 | 0 |
| Bologna | 2020–21 | Serie A | 5 | 0 | 2 | 0 | — | | — | | 7 | 0 |
| Bologna | Total | | 31 | 0 | 4 | 0 | — | | — | | 35 | 0 |
| Club Brugge (loan) | 2020–21 | Belgian Pro League | 12 | 0 | 3 | 0 | 0 | 0 | — | | 15 | 0 |
| Trabzonspor | 2021–22 | Süper Lig | 28 | 0 | 1 | 0 | 0 | 0 | — | | 29 | 0 |
| Trabzonspor | 2022–23 | Süper Lig | 19 | 1 | 1 | 0 | 8 (Note: Two appearances in UEFA Champions League, four appearances in UEFA Europa League, two appearances in UEFA Europa Conference League) | 0 | 0 | 0 | 28 | 1 |
| Trabzonspor | 2023–24 | Süper Lig | 26 | 1 | 5 | 1 | — | | — | | 31 | 2 |
| Trabzonspor | 2024–25 | Süper Lig | 9 | 1 | 0 | 0 | 6 (Note: Four appearances in UEFA Europa League, two appearances in UEFA Conference League) | 0 | — | | 15 | 1 |
| Trabzonspor | Total | | 82 | 3 | 7 | 1 | 14 | 0 | — | | 103 | 4 |
| Kayserispor | 2025–26 | Süper Lig | 28 | 1 | 0 | 0 | — | | — | | 28 | 1 |
| Career total | | | 335 | 13 | 31 | 3 | 44 | 4 | 3 | 0 | 413 | 20 |

== Honours ==
Ajax

- Eredivisie: 2012–13, 2013–14
- Johan Cruijff Shield: 2013

Club Brugge

- Belgian Pro League: 2015–16, 2017–18, 2020–21
- Belgian Cup: 2014–15
- Belgian Super Cup: 2016, 2018

Trabzonspor

- Süper Lig: 2021–22
- Turkish Super Cup: 2022
