= Laurens De Bock =

Belgian footballer

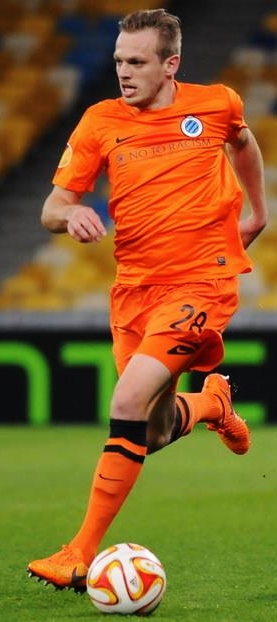
- De Bock playing for Club Brugge in 2015

Personal information
- Full name: Laurence Henry Cristine De Bock
- Date of birth: 7 November 1992 (age 33)
- Place of birth: Dendermonde, Belgium
- Height: 1.79 m (5 ft 10 in)
- Position: Left-back

Team information
- Current team: KFC HO Kalken
- Number: 28

Youth career
- 1997–2000: HO Kalken
- 2000–2003: Standaard Wetteren
- 2003–2009: Lokeren

Senior career*
| Years | Team | Apps | (Gls) |
| 2009–2013 | Lokeren | 80 | (1) |
| 2013–2018 | Club Brugge | 130 | (1) |
| 2018–2022 | Leeds United | 7 | (0) |
| 2018–2019 | → Oostende (loan) | 20 | (1) |
| 2019–2020 | → Sunderland (loan) | 5 | (0) |
| 2020 | → ADO Den Haag (loan) | 8 | (0) |
| 2020–2022 | → Zulte Waregem (loan) | 59 | (2) |
| 2022 | Zulte Waregem | 0 | (0) |
| 2022–2024 | Atromitos | 56 | (0) |
| 2025– | KFC HO Kalken | 14 | (1) |

International career
| 2008 | Belgium U16 | 9 | (0) |
| 2008–2009 | Belgium U17 | 14 | (1) |
| 2009–2010 | Belgium U18 | 10 | (1) |
| 2010–2011 | Belgium U19 | 10 | (1) |
| 2012–2014 | Belgium U21 | 12 | (0) |
- * Club domestic league appearances and goals as of 21 January 2026

Laurence Henry Cristine De Bock (born 7 November 1992), known as Laurens De Bock, is a Belgian professional footballer who plays as a left-back for KFC HO Kalken.

He has represented Belgium at various youth levels including Belgium U21s. He has been named in the Belgium national team but remains uncapped.

== Club career ==
=== Early career ===
De Bock joined HO Kalken in his youth. After three years, the defender made the switch to the neighboring Standaard Wetteren, where he was discovered at the age of 11 by scouts of KSC Lokeren. De Bock combined football with his studies at the top sports school in Ghent.

=== KSC Lokeren ===
After coming through the Lokeren youth set up, manager Georges Leekens brought then 16-year-old De Bock to the first team squad. In the 2009–10 season, in the first match of the play-offs, De Bock made his debut at the highest level under manager Emilio Ferrera. During the 2011–12 season he won the Belgian Cup.

=== Club Brugge ===
After being linked with Anderlecht, on 5 January, De Bock joined Club Brugge, where he signed a contract until the end of the 2017 season, for a transfer fee of €3.5 million. He won the Belgian Cup with Brugge during the 2014–15 season and followed this up by winning the Belgian Pro League in the 2015–16 season and then the Belgian Super Cup in 2016.

=== Leeds United ===
On 11 January 2018, De Bock signed for Championship club Leeds United on a four-and-a-half-year contract. De Bock was handed the number 12 shirt. He made his debut for Leeds on 20 January 2018 in a dramatic 4–3 loss against Millwall.

De Bock featured in seven games, including having a 'tough game' against Derby County, before losing his starting place to 19-year-old Tom Pearce.

==== Loan to Oostende ====
After falling behind left backs Barry Douglas, Leif Davis and Tom Pearce in the pecking order under new head coach Marcelo Bielsa for the start of the 2018–19 season, on 21 August 2018, De Bock joined Belgian First Division A side Oostende on a season-long loan. De Bock revealed that he had turned down a loan move to Israeli Premier League side Beitar Jerusalem F.C. to join K.V. Oostende.

In total, he made 20 appearances scoring 1 goal for K.V. Oostende in Belgian First Division A.

==== Loan to Sunderland ====
On 2 September 2019, De Bock signed for Sunderland on a season-long loan. He made his league debut for the club on 28 September in their 2–1 defeat of Milton Keynes Dons.

==== Loan to ADO Den Haag ====
On 13 January 2020, De Bock joined Eredivisie club ADO Den Haag on loan until the end of the season.

==== Loan to Zulte Waregem ====
He joined Zulte Waregem on a season-long loan in July 2020. He subsequently rejoined Zulte Waregem on a fresh season-long loan agreement in July 2021.

Having not made an appearance for Leeds since January 2018, De Bock's time with the Yorkshire club concluded in June 2022 with the end of his contract.

=== Zulte Waregem ===
It was announced on 20 May 2022 that De Bock had signed a permanent 1-year deal for the 2022–23 season with Zulte Waregem, with the option of a further year.

=== Atromitos ===
On 30 July 2022, De Bock signed a two-year contract with Atromitos in Greece, moving on a free transfer.

== International career ==
De Bock has represented Belgium at various age levels including Under 21.

In November 2014, De Bock was named in the Belgium squad for a friendly against Romania, however was unused. In November 2014 De Bock was recalled into the senior Belgium squad as injury cover for Vincent Kompany in their UEFA Euro 2016 qualifier against Wales, and was called up again in March 2015.

== Career statistics ==
As of match played 13 November 2022

Appearances and goals by club, season and competition
| Club | Season | League | | | National Cup | | Europe | | Other | | Total | |
| Club | Season | Division | Apps | Goals | Apps | Goals | Apps | Goals | Apps | Goals | Apps | Goals |
|---|---|---|---|---|---|---|---|---|---|---|---|---|
| Lokeren | 2009–10 | Pro League | 5 | 0 | 0 | 0 | — | | — | | 5 | 0 |
| Lokeren | 2010–11 | Pro League | 25 | 0 | 2 | 0 | — | | — | | 27 | 0 |
| Lokeren | 2011–12 | Pro League | 29 | 1 | 6 | 0 | — | | — | | 35 | 1 |
| Lokeren | 2012–13 | Pro League | 21 | 0 | 1 | 0 | 2 (Note: Appearances in the Europa League) | 0 | 1 (Note: Appearances in the Belgian Super Cup) | 0 | 25 | 0 |
| Lokeren | Total | | 80 | 1 | 7 | 0 | 2 | 0 | 1 | 0 | 90 | 1 |
| Club Brugge | 2012–13 | Pro League | 11 | 0 | — | | — | | — | | 11 | 0 |
| Club Brugge | 2013–14 | Pro League | 33 | 0 | 1 | 0 | 2 | 0 | — | | 36 | 0 |
| Club Brugge | 2014–15 | Pro League | 36 | 0 | 5 | 0 | 13 | 1 | — | | 54 | 1 |
| Club Brugge | 2015–16 | Pro League | 31 | 1 | 4 | 0 | 8 (Note: Four appearances in the Europa League and four in the Champions League) | 0 | 1 | 0 | 44 | 1 |
| Club Brugge | 2016–17 | Belgian First Division A | 18 | 0 | 2 | 0 | 3 (Note: Appearances in the Champions League) | 0 | 1 | 0 | 24 | 0 |
| Club Brugge | 2017–18 | Belgian First Division A | 6 | 0 | 0 | 0 | 2 (Note: One appearance in the Champions League and one in the Europa League) | 0 | — | | 8 | 0 |
| Club Brugge | Total | | 135 | 1 | 12 | 0 | 28 | 1 | 2 | 0 | 177 | 2 |
| Leeds United | 2017–18 | Championship | 7 | 0 | 0 | 0 | — | | 0 | 0 | 7 | 0 |
| Oostende (loan) | 2018–19 | Belgian First Division A | 20 | 1 | 0 | 0 | — | | — | | 20 | 1 |
| Sunderland (loan) | 2019–20 | League One | 5 | 0 | 2 | 0 | — | | 3 (Note: Two appearances in the EFL Trophy and one in the EFL Cup) | 0 | 10 | 0 |
| ADO Den Haag (loan) | 2019–20 | Eredivisie | 8 | 0 | — | | — | | — | | 8 | 0 |
| Zulte Waregem (loan) | 2020–21 | Belgian First Division A | 31 | 2 | 1 | 0 | — | | — | | 32 | 2 |
| Zulte Waregem (loan) | 2021–22 | Belgian First Division A | 28 | 0 | 2 | 0 | — | | — | | 30 | 0 |
| Zulte Waregem (loan) | 2022–23 | Belgian First Division A | 1 | 0 | 0 | 0 | — | | — | | 1 | 0 |
| Zulte Waregem (loan) | Total | | 60 | 2 | 3 | 0 | — | | — | | 63 | 2 |
| Atromitos | 2022–23 | Super League Greece | 12 | 0 | 0 | 0 | — | | — | | 12 | 0 |
| Career total | | | 327 | 5 | 24 | 0 | 30 | 1 | 5 | 0 | 387 | 6 |

== Honours ==
KSC Lokeren

- Belgian Cup: 2011–12

Club Brugge

- Belgian First Division: 2015–16
- Belgian Cup: 2014–15
- Belgian Super Cup: 2016
