= Benoît Poulain =

French footballer (born 1987)

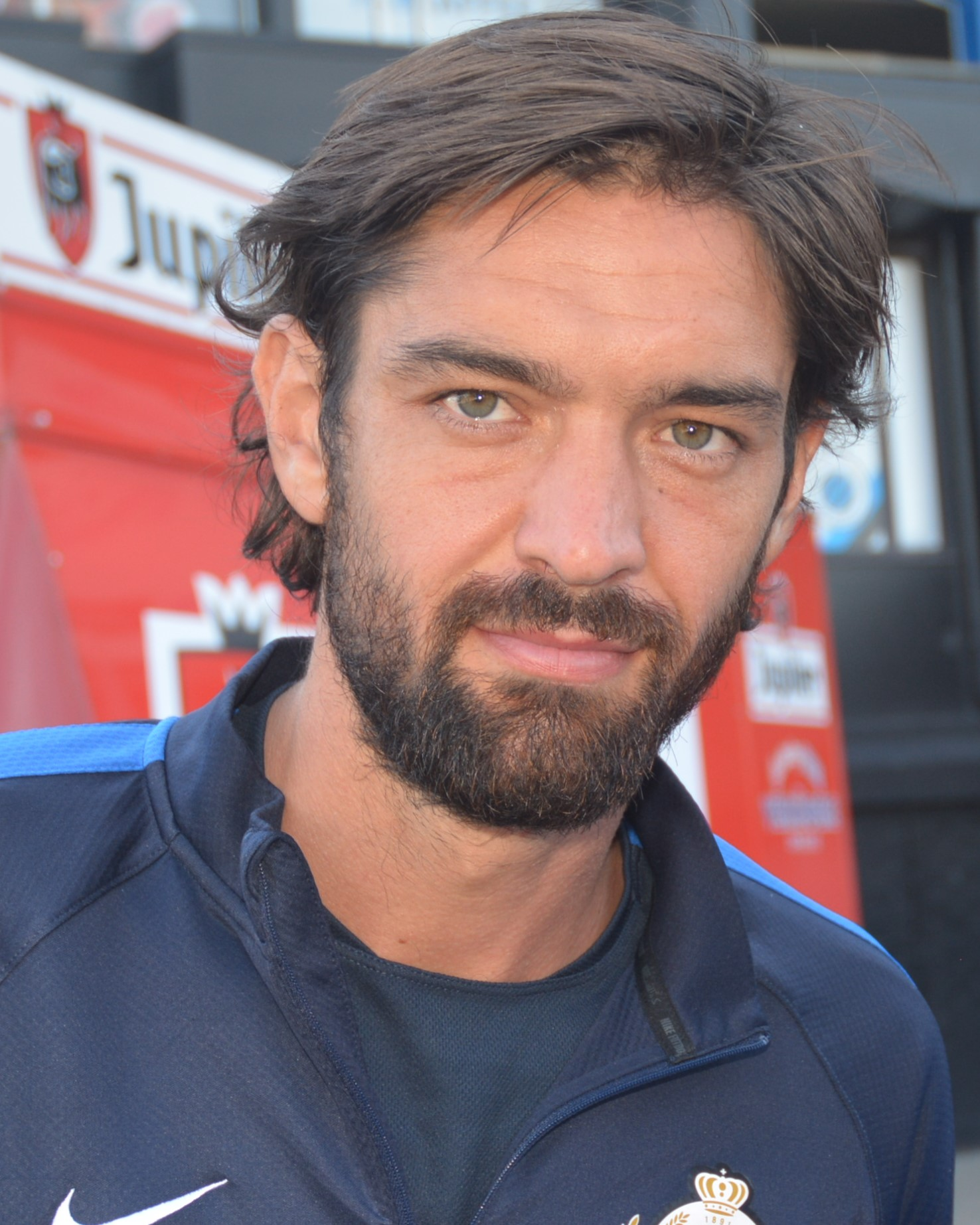
- Poulain with Club Brugge in 2017

Personal information
- Full name: Benoît Guy Jean Poulain
- Date of birth: 27 July 1987 (age 39)
- Place of birth: Montpellier, France
- Height: 1.88 m (6 ft 2 in)
- Position: Centre-back

Senior career*
Years	Team	Apps	(Gls)
2006–2014	Nîmes	177	(5)
2014–2016	Kortrijk	45	(2)
2016–2019	Club Brugge	69	(2)
2019–2020	Kayserispor	14	(1)
2020–2022	Eupen	21	(0)
2022–2023	Nîmes	20	(1)
- * Club domestic league appearances and goals as of 28 June 2023

Benoît Guy Jean Poulain (born 27 July 1987) is a French professional footballer who plays as a centre-back.

== Career ==
On 14 July 2022, Poulain returned to Nîmes on a one-season deal.

== Career statistics ==
As of match played 2 August 2017

Appearances and goals by club, season and competition
Club	Season	League			National cup		League cup		Europe		Other		Total	
Club	Season	Division	Apps	Goals	Apps	Goals	Apps	Goals	Apps	Goals	Apps	Goals	Apps	Goals
Nîmes	2008–09	Ligue 2	20	1	0	0	0	0	–		–		20	1
Nîmes	2009–10	Ligue 2	32	0	0	0	2	0	–		–		34	0
Nîmes	2010–11	Ligue 2	29	1	3	0	2	0	–		–		34	1
Nîmes	2011–12	CFA	32	2	0	0	1	0	–		–		33	2
Nîmes	2012–13	Ligue 2	35	0	2	0	1	0	–		–		38	0
Nîmes	2013–14	Ligue 2	29	1	0	0	0	0	–		–		29	1
Nîmes	Total		177	5	5	0	6	0	0	0	0	0	188	5
Kortrijk	2014–15	Belgian Pro League	26	2	2	0	–		–		–		28	2
Kortrijk	2015–16	Belgian Pro League	19	0	3	1	–		–		–		22	1
Kortrijk	Total		45	2	5	1	0	0	0	0	0	0	50	3
Club Brugge	2015–16	Belgian Pro League	7	0	1	0	–		0	0	0	0	8	0
Club Brugge	2016–17	Belgian First Division A	20	0	2	0	–		5 (Note: Appearances in the Champions League)	0	0	0	27	0
Club Brugge	2017–18	Belgian First Division A	0	0	0	0	–		0	0	0	0	0	0
Club Brugge	Total		27	0	3	0	0	0	5	0	0	0	35	0
Career total			249	7	13	1	6	0	5	0	0	0	273	8

== Honours ==
Club Brugge

- Belgian Super Cup: 2016, 2018
- Belgian Pro League: 2016, 2018
