= 2016 Belgian Super Cup =

Club Brugge	Standard Liège
League winners	Cup winners
2	1
- Date: 23 July 2016
- Venue: Jan Breydel Stadium, Bruges
- Man of the Match: Izquierdo (Club Brugge)
- Referee: Wim Smet
- Attendance: 15,000

The 2016 Belgian Super Cup was a football match that took take place on 23 July 2016, between the 2015–16 Belgian Pro League winners Club Brugge and Standard Liège, the winners of the 2015–16 Belgian Cup. Club Brugge played their 17th Super Cup and featured in their second consecutive Super Cup after losing the 2015 Belgian Super Cup to Gent, while Standard Liège played their 8th Belgian Super Cup after last appearing in 2011 when they lost to Genk. Although together both teams have already played 23 times the Belgian Super Cup, they have never met each other in this competition. Standard Liège last success in the competition dates from a 2-0 win in 2009, against Genk, while Club Brugge last won in 2005 against the now defunct team Germinal Beerschot. The match was however a replay of the 2016 Belgian Cup Final, won by Standard Liège in March 2016.

== Match ==
=== Details ===
23 July 2016
20:00 CEST

Club Brugge	2–1	Standard Liège
Izquierdo 51'; Vormer 62'	Report	Santini 39'

Jan Breydelstadion, Bruges
Referee: Wim Smet

Club Brugge	Standard Liège

GK	1	(France) Ludovic Butelle
RB	21	(Belgium) Dion Cools
CB	3	(Belgium) Timmy Simons (c)
CB	24	(Netherlands) Stefano Denswil
LB	28	(Belgium) Laurens De Bock
CM	6	(Brazil) Claudemir	(yellow card) 71'
CM	25	(Netherlands) Ruud Vormer
AM	20	(Belgium) Hans Vanaken	(red card) 41'
RW	8	(Israel) Lior Refaelov		(substituted off) 63'
CF	9	(Belgium) Jelle Vossen	(yellow card) 85'	(substituted off) 90+2'
LW	22	(Colombia) José Izquierdo		(substituted off) 78'
Substitutes:
GK	16	(Belgium) Sébastien Bruzzese
DF	2	(Netherlands) Ricardo van Rhijn
CB	5	(France) Benoît Poulain
LB	63	(Belgium) Boli Bolingoli-Mbombo		(substituted on) 78'
MF	7	(Brazil) Wesley		(substituted on) 90+2'
FW	42	(Belgium) Nikola Storm
FW	10	(Mali) Abdoulay Diaby		(substituted on) 63'
Manager:
(Belgium) Michel Preud'homme

GK	1	(Belgium) Jean-François Gillet
RB	32	(Cameroon) Collins Fai
CB	36	(Belgium) Dino Arslanagić
CB	13	(Denmark) Alexander Scholz
LB	27	(Colombia) Darwin Andrade
CM	44	(Belgium) Ibrahima Cissé	(yellow card) 44'	(substituted off) 76'
CM	23	(France) Adrien Trebel (c)
AM	15	(Uganda) Farouk Miya		(substituted off) 66'
RW	7	(Togo) Mathieu Dossevi
CF	18	(Croatia) Ivan Santini		(substituted off) 59'
LW	22	(Belgium) Edmilson
Substitutes:
GK	28	(Belgium) Guillaume Hubert
DF	2	(Haiti) Réginal Goreux
DF	34	(Cyprus) Constantinos Laifis
MF	21	(Cameroon) Eyong Enoh
MF	30	(Belgium) Jonathan Legear		(substituted on) 66'
FW	9	(Belgium) Renaud Emond		(substituted on) 59'
FW	19	(Guinea) Mohamed Yattara	(yellow card) 90+3'	(substituted on) 76'
Manager:
(Belgium) Yannick Ferrera

Match rules

- 90 minutes.
- Penalty shoot-out if scores level.
- Seven named substitutes.
- Maximum of three substitutions.

== See also ==
- 2016–17 Belgian Pro League
- 2016–17 Belgian Cup
