= 2022–23 Club Brugge KV season =

Club Brugge KV
2022–23 season
- President: Bart Verhaeghe
- Manager: Carl Hoefkens (until 27 December); Scott Parker (from 31 December to 8 March); Rik De Mil (caretaker, from 8 March)
- Stadium: Jan Breydel Stadium
- Pro League: 4th
- Belgian Cup: Seventh round
- Belgian Super Cup: Winners
- UEFA Champions League: Round of 16
- Top goalscorer: League: Ferran Jutglà (13); All: Ferran Jutglà (15)
| Home colours | Away colours | Third colours |

The 2022–23 season was the 131st in the history of Club Brugge KV and their 63rd consecutive season in the top flight. In addition to the domestic league, they participated in the Belgian Cup, Belgian Super Cup and UEFA Champions League.

== Players ==
As of 29 August 2022

Note: Flags indicate national team as defined under FIFA eligibility rules; some limited exceptions apply. Players may hold more than one non-FIFA nationality.

| No. | Pos. | Nation | Player |
|---|---|---|---|
| 2 | DF | UKR | Eduard Sobol |
| 3 | MF | COL | Éder Balanta |
| 4 | DF | ECU | Joel Ordóñez |
| 5 | DF | SCO | Jack Hendry |
| 6 | DF | GHA | Denis Odoi |
| 7 | FW | DEN | Andreas Skov Olsen |
| 8 | MF | USA | Owen Otasowie |
| 9 | FW | ESP | Ferran Jutglà |
| 10 | FW | NED | Noa Lang |
| 11 | FW | CAN | Cyle Larin |
| 14 | DF | NED | Bjorn Meijer |
| 17 | FW | CAN | Tajon Buchanan |
| 19 | MF | GHA | Kamal Sowah |
| 20 | MF | BEL | Hans Vanaken (vice-captain) |
| 22 | GK | BEL | Simon Mignolet |

| No. | Pos. | Nation | Player |
|---|---|---|---|
| 25 | MF | NED | Ruud Vormer (captain) |
| 26 | MF | BEL | Mats Rits |
| 27 | MF | DEN | Casper Nielsen |
| 28 | DF | BEL | Dedryck Boyata |
| 30 | FW | VEN | Daniel Pérez |
| 32 | FW | NOR | Antonio Nusa |
| 33 | GK | BEL | Nick Shinton |
| 44 | DF | BEL | Brandon Mechele |
| 77 | DF | ANG | Clinton Mata |
| 89 | MF | BEL | Lynnt Audoor |
| 91 | GK | BEL | Senne Lammens |
| 92 | DF | BEL | Ibe Hautekiet |
| 94 | DF | CIV | Abakar Sylla |
| 98 | MF | BEL | Cisse Sandra |
| 70 | FW | UKR | Roman Yaremchuk |

== Transfers ==
=== In ===
| Date | Position | Name | From | Fee | Ref. |
|---|---|---|---|---|---|
| 1 July 2022 | MF | (Ghana) Kamal Sowah | (Netherlands) AZ | Loan return | |
| 1 July 2022 | DF | (Netherlands) Bjorn Meijer | (Netherlands) Groningen | £5,400,000 | |
| 1 July 2022 | FW | (Spain) Ferran Jutglà | (Spain) Barcelona | £4,500,000 | |
| 4 July 2022 | FW | (Canada) Cyle Larin | (Turkey) Beşiktaş | Free | |
| 17 July 2022 | MF | (Denmark) Casper Nielsen | (Belgium) Union SG | £4,950,000 | |
| 22 August 2022 | DF | (Belgium) Dedryck Boyata | (Germany) Hertha BSC | £1,800,000 | |
| 29 August 2022 | FW | (Ukraine) Roman Yaremchuk | (Portugal) Benfica | £13,670,000 | |

=== Out ===
| Date | Position | Player | To | Fee | Ref. |
|---|---|---|---|---|---|
| 1 July 2022 | FW | (Czech Republic) Michael Krmenčík | (Indonesia) Persija Jakarta | £1,530,000 | |
| 1 July 2022 | DF | (Netherlands) Bas Dost | (Netherlands) Utrecht | Free | |
| 1 July 2022 | DF | (Croatia) Matej Mitrović | (Croatia) Rijeka | Free | |
| 1 July 2022 | FW | (Armenia) Sargis Adamyan | (Germany) 1. FC Köln | Loan return | |
| 1 July 2022 | MF | (Belgium) Tibo Persyn | (Italy) Inter Milan | Loan return | |
| 1 July 2022 | DF | (France) Faitout Maouassa | (France) Montpellier | Loan | |
| 6 July 2022 | FW | (Belgium) Loïs Openda | (France) Lens | £8,820,000 | |
| 2 August 2022 | FW | (Belgium) Charles De Ketelaere | (Italy) AC Milan | £28,800,000 | |
| 4 August 2022 | DF | (France) Stanley Nsoki | (Germany) 1899 Hoffenheim | £10,800,000 | |
| 1 September 2022 | DF | (Scotland) Jack Hendry | (Italy) Cremonese | Loan | |
| 14 January 2023 | DF | (Belgium) Noah Mbamba | (Germany) Bayer Leverkusen | €100,000 | |

== Pre-season and friendlies ==
Win Draw Loss Fixtures

| 29 June 2022 Friendly | Club Brugge (Belgium) | 1–1 | (Belgium) Lierse | Brussels |
| 15:30 CEST (UTC+2) | | | | Stadium: Complexe Sportif Neerpede |

| 2 July 2022 Friendly | Club Brugge (Belgium) | 2–1 | (Belgium) Beerschot | Roeselare |
| 15:30 CEST (UTC+2) | | | | Stadium: The Nest |
Note: Match was played in two 60-minute halves.

| 9 July 2022 Friendly | Club Brugge (Belgium) | 2–4 | (Denmark) Copenhagen | Doorwerth |
| 12:30 CEST (UTC+2) | Vormer 22'; Jutglà 31' | | Biel 70' (pen.), 76'; Bøving 109'; Bardghji 113' | Stadium: Sportpark De Waayenberg; Attendance: 50 |

| 13 July 2022 Friendly | Club Brugge (Belgium) | 4–2 | (Netherlands) Utrecht | Knokke-Heist |
| 15:30 CEST (UTC+2) | Lang 13'; Viergever 20' (o.g.); Jutglà 68', 73' | | Van der Hoorn (yellow card); Douvikas 28'; Mahi 88' | Stadium: Belfius Basecamp; Attendance: 0 Referee: Kevin Debeuckelaere |

| 18 July 2022 Friendly | Club Brugge (Belgium) | 4–3 | (France) Lille | Knokke-Heist |
| 11:30 CEST (UTC+2) | Okereke 18'; Engels 19'; Audoor 80'; Vermant 90+3' | Report | Zhegrova 22'; David 43'; Gomes 88' | Stadium: Belfius Basecamp |

== Competitions ==
=== Overall record ===
| Competition | First match | Last match | Starting round | Final position | Record | | | | | | | |
| Competition | First match | Last match | Starting round | Final position | Pld | W | D | L | GF | GA | GD | Win % |
|---|---|---|---|---|---|---|---|---|---|---|---|---|
| Pro League | 24 July 2022 | 4 June 2023 | Matchday 1 | 4th | 40 | 18 | 11 | 11 | 71 | 48 | +23 | 45.00 |
| Belgian Cup | 9 November 2022 | 21 December 2022 | Sixth round | Seventh round | 2 | 1 | 0 | 1 | 3 | 4 | −1 | 50.00 |
| Belgian Super Cup | 17 July 2022 | | Final | Winners | 1 | 1 | 0 | 0 | 1 | 0 | +1 | 100.00 |
| UEFA Champions League | 7 September 2022 | 7 March 2023 | Group stage | Round of 16 | 8 | 3 | 2 | 3 | 8 | 11 | −3 | 37.50 |
| Total | | | | | 51 | 23 | 13 | 15 | 83 | 63 | +20 | 45.10 |

Source: Soccerway

=== Pro League ===
==== League table ====
| Pos | Team | Pld | W | D | L | GF | GA | GD | Pts | Qualification or relegation |
|---|---|---|---|---|---|---|---|---|---|---|
| 2 | Union SG | 34 | 23 | 6 | 5 | 70 | 41 | +29 | 75 | Qualification for the Play-offs I |
| 3 | Antwerp (C) | 34 | 22 | 6 | 6 | 59 | 26 | +33 | 72 | Qualification for the Play-offs I |
| 4 | Club Brugge | 34 | 16 | 11 | 7 | 61 | 36 | +25 | 59 | Qualification for the Play-offs I |
| 5 | Gent (U) | 34 | 16 | 8 | 10 | 64 | 38 | +26 | 56 | Qualification for the Play-offs II |
| 6 | Standard Liège | 34 | 16 | 7 | 11 | 58 | 45 | +13 | 55 | Qualification for the Play-offs II |

Source: Jupiler Pro League (in Dutch), Soccerway
Rules for classification: 1) Points; 2) Matches won; 3) Goal difference; 4) Goals scored; 5) Away matches won; 6) Away goal difference; 7) Away goals scored; 8) Play-off.
(C) Play-off I winner; (U) Play-off II winner

==== Results summary ====
| Overall | | | | | | | | Home | | | | | | Away | | | | | |
| Pld | W | D | L | GF | GA | GD | Pts | W | D | L | GF | GA | GD | W | D | L | GF | GA | GD |
|---|---|---|---|---|---|---|---|---|---|---|---|---|---|---|---|---|---|---|---|
| 17 | 10 | 3 | 4 | 34 | 20 | +14 | 33 | 6 | 2 | 1 | 22 | 10 | +12 | 4 | 1 | 3 | 12 | 10 | +2 |

Last updated: 13 November 2022.
Source: Jupiler Pro League

==== Results by round ====
| Round | 1 | 2 | 3 | 4 | 5 | 6 | 7 | 8 | 9 | 10 | 11 | 12 | 13 | 14 | 15 | 16 | 17 | 18 | 19 | 20 | 21 | 22 | 23 | 24 | 25 | 26 | 27 | 28 | 29 | 30 | 31 | 32 | 33 | 34 |
|---|---|---|---|---|---|---|---|---|---|---|---|---|---|---|---|---|---|---|---|---|---|---|---|---|---|---|---|---|---|---|---|---|---|---|
| Ground | H | A | H | A | H | A | H | A | A | H | H | A | H | A | H | A | H | H | A | H | A | H | A | A | H | A | H | A | H | A | A | H | A | H |
| Result | W | L | D | W | W | W | W | W | L | W | L | W | W | D | W | L | D | D | L | D | D | D | W | D | D | D | W | L | W | | | | | |
| Position | 7 | 8 | 8 | 5 | 4 | 3 | 3 | 3 | 3 | 3 | 3 | 3 | 3 | 3 | 3 | 4 | 4 | 4 | 4 | 4 | 4 | 5 | 4 | 4 | 4 | 4 | 4 | 4 | 4 | | | | | |

Updated to match(es) played on 13 March 2023. Source: Jupiler Pro League
A = Away; H = Home; W = Win; D = Draw; L = Loss

==== Matches ====
The league fixtures were announced on 22 June 2022.

| 24 July 2022 1 | Club Brugge | 3–2 | Genk | Bruges |
| 13:30 CEST (UTC+2) | Olsen 22' 90+2'; Vanaken 60' | Report | Dessers 30'; Trésor 47' | Stadium: Jan Breydel Stadium; Attendance: 19,209; Referee: Nicolas Laforge |

| 31 July 2022 2 | Eupen | 2–1 | Club Brugge | Eupen |
| 16:00 CEST (UTC+2) | Magnée 1'; Prevljak 19' | Report | Jutglà 7' | Stadium: Kehrwegstadion; Attendance: 3,080; Referee: Kevin Van Damme |

| 5 August 2022 3 | Club Brugge | 1–1 | Zulte Waregem | Bruges |
| 20:45 CEST (UTC+2) | Olsen 47' | Report | Drambayev 69' | Stadium: Jan Breydel Stadium; Attendance: 20,665; Referee: Nathan Verboomen |

| 14 August 2022 4 | OH Leuven | 0–3 | Club Brugge | Leuven |
| 18:30 CEST (UTC+2) | | Report | Nielsen 33'; Jutglà 42'; Lang 53' | Stadium: Den Dreef; Attendance: 9,000; Referee: Lothar D'hondt |

| 21 August 2022 5 | Club Brugge | 2–1 | Kortrijk | Bruges |
| 13:30 CEST (UTC+2) | Jutglà 4'; Meijer 9' | Report | Guèye 33' | Stadium: Jan Breydel Stadium; Attendance: 20,328; Referee: Jan Boterberg |

| 26 August 2022 6 | Charleroi | 1–3 | Club Brugge | Charleroi |
| 20:45 CEST (UTC+2) | Morioka 9' | Report | Jutglà 32' 36'; Nielsen 58' | Stadium: Stade du Pays de Charleroi; Attendance: 8,500; Referee: Jasper Vergoote |

| 2 September 2022 7 | Club Brugge | 4–0 | Cercle Brugge | Bruges |
| 20:45 CEST (UTC+2) | Olsen 43'; Marcelin 59' (o.g.); Nielsen 67'; Yaremchuk 82' | Report | | Stadium: Jan Breydel Stadium; Attendance: 23,243; Referee: Lawrence Visser |

| 10 September 2022 8 | Seraing | 0–2 | Club Brugge | Seraing |
| 18:15 CEST (UTC+2) | | Report | Larin 52'; Vanaken 69' | Stadium: Stade du Pairay; Attendance: 2,000; Referee: Wesli De Cremer |

| 18 September 2022 9 | Standard Liège | 3–0 | Club Brugge | Liège |
| 18:30 CEST (UTC+2) | Zinckernagel 30' 64'; Balikwisha 90+2' | Report | | Stadium: Stade Maurice Dufrasne; Attendance: 25,893; Referee: Jasper Vergoote |

| 1 October 2022 10 | Club Brugge | 3–0 | Mechelen | Bruges |
| 20:45 CEST (UTC+2) | Jutglà 37'; Sobol 53'; Buchanan 86' | Report | | Stadium: Jan Breydel Stadium; Attendance: 20,076; Referee: Kevin Van Damme |

| 8 October 2022 11 | Club Brugge | 0–2 | Westerlo | Bruges |
| 20:45 CEST (UTC+2) | | Report | Foster 53' 86' | Stadium: Jan Breydel Stadium; Attendance: 19,261; Referee: Bert Put |

| 16 October 2021 12 | Anderlecht | 0–1 | Club Brugge | Anderlecht |
| 18:30 CEST (UTC+2) | | Report | Nielsen 69' | Stadium: Constant Vanden Stock Stadium; Attendance: 18,000; Referee: Lawrence Visser |

| 19 October 2022 13 | Club Brugge | 3–0 | Sint-Truiden | Bruges |
| 18:45 CEST (UTC+2) | Vanaken 21'; Yaremchuk 66'; Olsen 71' | Report | | Stadium: Jan Breydel Stadium; Attendance: 29,042; Referee: Wim de Cremer |

| 22 October 2022 14 | Union Saint-Gilloise | 2–2 | Club Brugge | Brussels |
| 20:45 CEST (UTC+2) | Adingra (red card) 14'; Burgess (yellow card) 16' (goal) 32'; Moris (yellow card) 43'; Amani (yellow card) 45'; Nieuwkoop 80' (yellow card) 83' | Report | Skov Olsen 1'; Vanaken 16' (pen.) (yellow card) 45+1'; Meijer (yellow card) 56' | Stadium: Joseph Marien Stadium; Attendance: 7,184; Referee: (Belgium) Kevin Van Damme |

| 29 October 2022 15 | Club Brugge | 4–2 | KV Oostende | Bruges |
| 20:45 CEST (UTC+2) | Vanaken 34'; Ferran Jutglà 39'; Nielsen (yellow card) 59' (goal) 73'; Katelaris 80' (o.g.); Buchanan (yellow card) 84' | Report | Katelaris (yellow card) 20'; Hornby 57' 65' (pen.); Albanese (yellow card) 90+3' | Stadium: Jan Breydel Stadium; Attendance: 19,469; Referee: (Belgium) Brent Staessens |

| 6 November 2022 16 | Gent | 2–0 | Club Brugge | Ghent |
| 13:30 CET (UTC+1) | Cuypers 9'; Ngadeu 29'; Núrio Fortuna (yellow card) 52' | Report | Onyedika (yellow card) 36'; Vanaken (yellow card) 38'; Odoi (yellow card) 61'; Buchanan (yellow card) 87'; Skov Olsen (yellow card) 90+2' | Stadium: Ghelamco Arena; Attendance: 18,418; Referee: (Belgium) Lothar D'hondt |

| 13 November 2022 17 | Club Brugge | 2–2 | Antwerp | Bruges |
| 13:30 CET (UTC+1) | Mechele 34' (yellow card) 76'; Lang 62' (yellow card) 85'; Sylla (yellow card) 87'; Onyedika (yellow card) 90+5' | Report | De Laet (yellow card) 6'; Frey 75'; Janssen 78' (pen.); Yusuf (yellow card) 88' | Stadium: Jan Breydel Stadium; Attendance: 29,000; Referee: (Belgium) Jonathan Lardot |

| 26 December 2022 18 | Club Brugge | 1–1 | OH Leuven | Bruges |
| 13:30 CET (UTC+1) | Mata (yellow card) 22'; Sylla (yellow card) 34'; Jutglà 43' (pen.); Onyedika (yellow card) 85' | Report | Þorsteinsson (yellow card) 16'; Malinov (yellow card) 24'; Nsingi 90+4' | Stadium: Jan Breydel Stadium; Attendance: 18,241; Referee: (Belgium) Bert Put |

| 8 January 2023 19 | Genk | 3–1 | Club Brugge | Genk |
| 13:30 CET (UTC+1) | Cuesta 25'; Paintsil (yellow card) 28'; Muñoz (yellow card) 36'; Onuachu 67'; Heynen 81' | Report | Vanaken 21'; Lang (yellow card) 28'; Buchanan (yellow card) 33'; Sylla (yellow card) 40' (yellow-red card) 75' | Stadium: Cegeka Arena; Referee: Lawrence Visser |

| 15 January 2023 20 | Club Brugge | 1–1 | Anderlecht | Bruges |
| 13:30 CET (UTC+1) | Yaremchuk (yellow card) 7'; Nielsen 69'; Buchanan (yellow card) 27' | Report | Mechele 79' (o.g.); Sardella (yellow card) 51'; Arnstad (yellow card) 70'; Murillo (yellow card) 73' | Stadium: Jan Breydel Stadium; Attendance: 29,042; Referee: (Belgium) Nathan Verboomen |

==== Play-Off I ====
| Pos | Team | Pld | W | D | L | GF | GA | GD | Pts | Qualification or relegation | ANT | GNK | USG | CLU |
|---|---|---|---|---|---|---|---|---|---|---|---|---|---|---|
| 1 | Antwerp (C) | 6 | 3 | 2 | 1 | 10 | 8 | +2 | 47 | Qualification for the Champions League play-off round | — | 2–1 | 1–1 | 3–2 |
| 2 | Genk (K) | 6 | 2 | 2 | 2 | 10 | 10 | 0 | 46 (Note: Tied on Points and Points without half points added due to rounding. Regular Season finishing position: Genk 1, Union SG 2.) | Qualification for the Champions League second qualifying round | 2–2 | — | 1–1 | 3–1 |
| 3 | Union SG | 6 | 2 | 2 | 2 | 8 | 8 | 0 | 46 | Qualification for the Europa League play-off round | 0–2 | 3–0 | — | 1–3 |
| 4 | Club Brugge | 6 | 2 | 0 | 4 | 10 | 12 | −2 | 36 | Qualification for the Europa Conference League second qualifying round | 2–0 | 1–3 | 1–2 | — |

Source: Jupiler Pro League (in Dutch), Soccerway
Legend: Blue = home team win; Yellow = draw; Red = away team win.
Rules for classification: 1) Points; 2) Points without (possible) half points added due to rounding; 3) Regular season finishing position.
(C) Champions; (K) Regular season winner

=== Belgian Cup ===
| 9 November 2022 Sixth round | Patro Eisden | 0–2 (a.e.t.) | Club Brugge | Maasmechelen |
| 20:45 | Bounou (yellow card) 64'; Yassin Gueroui (yellow card) 71'; Sam (yellow card) 73'; Dijkhuizen (yellow card) 94' | Report | Onyedika (yellow card) 29'; Vanaken (yellow card) 68'; Lang 103' 118' | Stadium: Patro Stadion; Referee: (Belgium) Quentin Pirard |

| 21 December 2022 Seventh round | Club Brugge | 1–4 | Sint-Truiden | Brugge |
| 20:00 | Lang 17'; Onyedika (yellow card) 34' | Report | Brüls 33'; Bruno 62', 88'; Hayashi 69'; Hashioka (yellow card) 83' | Stadium: Jan Breydel Stadium; Referee: (Belgium) Lothar D'hondt |

=== Belgian Super Cup ===
| 17 July 2022 Final | Club Brugge | 1–0 | Gent | Bruges |
| 18:00 CEST (UTC+2) | Skov Olsen 39' | Report | | Stadium: Jan Breydel Stadium; Attendance: 18,166; Referee: Erik Lambrechts |

=== UEFA Champions League ===
==== Group stage ====
The draw for the group stage was held on 25 August 2022.

| Pos | Team | Pld | W | D | L | GF | GA | GD | Pts | Qualification | POR | BRU | LEV | ATM |
|---|---|---|---|---|---|---|---|---|---|---|---|---|---|---|
| 1 | (Portugal) Porto | 6 | 4 | 0 | 2 | 12 | 7 | +5 | 12 | Advance to knockout phase | — | 0–4 | 2–0 | 2–1 |
| 2 | (Belgium) Club Brugge | 6 | 3 | 2 | 1 | 7 | 4 | +3 | 11 | Advance to knockout phase | 0–4 | — | 1–0 | 2–0 |
| 3 | (Germany) Bayer Leverkusen | 6 | 1 | 2 | 3 | 4 | 8 | −4 | 5 (Note: Head-to-head points: Bayer Leverkusen 4, Atlético Madrid 1.) | Transfer to Europa League | 0–3 | 0–0 | — | 2–0 |
| 4 | (Spain) Atlético Madrid | 6 | 1 | 2 | 3 | 5 | 9 | −4 | 5 | | 2–1 | 0–0 | 2–2 | — |

Source: UEFA
Rules for classification: Group stage tiebreakers
Notes:

| 7 September 2022 1 | Club Brugge (Belgium) | 1–0 | (Germany) Bayer Leverkusen | Bruges, Belgium |
| 21:00 CEST (UTC+2) | Sylla 42'; Sowah (yellow card) 78' | Report | Palacios (yellow card) 59'; Andrich (yellow card) 62'; Demirbay (yellow card) 68' | Stadium: Jan Breydel Stadium; Attendance: 21,235; Referee: Irfan Peljto (Bosnia and Herzegovina) |

| 13 September 2022 2 | Porto (Portugal) | 0–4 | (Belgium) Club Brugge | Porto, Portugal |
| 20:00 WEST (UTC+1) | João Mário (yellow card) 14'; Carmo (yellow card) 77' | Report | Jutglà 15' (pen.); Onyedika (yellow card) 19'; Odoi (yellow card) 27'; Nielsen (yellow card) 45+1'; Sowah 47'; Skov Olsen 52'; Sylla (yellow card) 54'; Nusa 89' | Stadium: Estádio do Dragão; Attendance: 39,225; Referee: Anastasios Sidiropoulos (Greece) |

| 4 October 2022 3 | Club Brugge (Belgium) | 2–0 | (Spain) Atlético Madrid | Bruges, Belgium |
| 21:00 CEST (UTC+2) | Sowah 36'; Odoi (yellow card) 37'; Onyedika (yellow card) 45+1'; Jutglà 62'; Buchanan (yellow card) 70'; Mignolet (yellow card) 75'; Sylla (yellow card) 88' | Report | Mandava (yellow card) 53'; Savić (yellow card) 61'; Griezmann (penalty missed) 76' | Stadium: Jan Breydel Stadium; Attendance: 25,667; Referee: István Kovács (Romania) |

| 12 October 2022 4 | Atlético Madrid (Spain) | 0–0 | (Belgium) Club Brugge | Madrid, Spain |
| 18:45 CEST (UTC+2) | Savić (yellow card) 45+2'; Kondogbia (yellow card) 80' | Report | Buchanan (yellow card) 44'; Sowah (yellow card) 45+2' (yellow-red card) 82'; Vanaken (yellow card) 46'; Mignolet (yellow card) 90' | Stadium: Wanda Metropolitano; Attendance: 60,810; Referee: Danny Makkelie (Netherlands) |

| 26 October 2022 5 | Club Brugge (Belgium) | 0–4 | (Portugal) Porto | Bruges, Belgium |
| 18:45 CEST (UTC+2) | Odoi (yellow card) 28'; Sylla (yellow card) 54'; Onyedika (yellow card) 56' | Report | Eustáquio (yellow card) 29', (goal) 60'; Taaremi 29', 70'; Otávio (yellow card) 42'; Carmo (yellow card) 49'; Evanilson 57'; Uribe (yellow card) 65' | Stadium: Jan Breydel Stadium; Attendance: 26,144; Referee: Michael Oliver (England) |

| 1 November 2022 6 | Bayer Leverkusen (Germany) | 0–0 | (Belgium) Club Brugge | Leverkusen, Germany |
| 18:45 CET (UTC+1) | Palacios (yellow card) 43'; Andrich (yellow card) 63' | Report | Sobol (yellow card) 36'; Boyata (yellow card) 82'; Nielsen (yellow card) 84' | Stadium: BayArena; Attendance: 30,210; Referee: Maurizio Mariani (Italy) |

==== Knockout stage ====
===== Round of 16 =====
The draw for the round of 16 was held on 7 November 2022.

| 15 February 2023 First leg | Club Brugge (Belgium) | 0–2 | (Portugal) Benfica | Bruges, Belgium |
| 21:00 CET (UTC+01:00) | Odoi (yellow card) 9'; Sowah (yellow card) 29' | Report | Otamendi (yellow card) 43'; João Mário 51' (pen.); Neres 88' | Stadium: Jan Breydel Stadium; Attendance: 24,136; Referee: Davide Massa (Italy) |

| 7 March 2023 Second leg | Benfica (Portugal) | 5–1 (7–1 agg.) | (Belgium) Club Brugge | Lisbon, Portugal |
| 20:00 WET (UTC±00:00) | Otamendi (yellow card) 29'; R. Silva 38'; Ramos 45+2', 57'; João Mário 71' (pen.); Neres 77' | Report | Yaremchuk (yellow card) 17'; Lang (yellow card) 20'; Sylla (yellow card) 43'; Meijer (yellow card) 48', (goal) 87' | Stadium: Estádio da Luz; Attendance: 60,960; Referee: Halil Umut Meler (Turkey) |

== Statistics ==
=== Squad appearances and goals ===
Last updated on 4 June 2023

| No. | Pos | Nat | Player | Total | | Pro League | | Belgian Cup | | Belgian Super Cup | | UEFA Champions League | |
| No. | Pos | Nat | Player | Apps | Goals | Apps | Goals | Apps | Goals | Apps | Goals | Apps | Goals |
Goalkeepers
| 21 | GK | (England) ENG | Josef Bursik | 0 | 0 | 0 | 0 | 0 | 0 | 0 | 0 | 0 | 0 |
| 22 | GK | (Belgium) BEL | Simon Mignolet | 51 | 0 | 40 | 0 | 2 | 0 | 1 | 0 | 8 | 0 |
| 33 | GK | (Belgium) BEL | Nick Shinton | 0 | 0 | 0 | 0 | 0 | 0 | 0 | 0 | 0 | 0 |
| 91 | GK | (Belgium) BEL | Senne Lammens | 0 | 0 | 0 | 0 | 0 | 0 | 0 | 0 | 0 | 0 |
Defenders
| 4 | DF | (Ecuador) ECU | Joel Ordóñez | 0 | 0 | 0 | 0 | 0 | 0 | 0 | 0 | 0 | 0 |
| 5 | DF | (Scotland) SCO | Jack Hendry | 7 | 0 | 6+1 | 0 | 0 | 0 | 0 | 0 | 0 | 0 |
| 6 | DF | (Ghana) GHA | Denis Odoi | 38 | 0 | 23+6 | 0 | 1 | 0 | 0+1 | 0 | 6+1 | 0 |
| 14 | DF | (Netherlands) NED | Bjorn Meijer | 46 | 4 | 33+2 | 3 | 2 | 0 | 1 | 0 | 6+2 | 1 |
| 28 | DF | (Belgium) BEL | Dedryck Boyata | 14 | 0 | 6+5 | 0 | 0 | 0 | 0 | 0 | 1+2 | 0 |
| 44 | DF | (Belgium) BEL | Brandon Mechele | 47 | 2 | 34+2 | 2 | 2 | 0 | 1 | 0 | 8 | 0 |
| 58 | DF | (Belgium) BEL | Jorne Spileers | 12 | 0 | 10+1 | 0 | 0 | 0 | 0 | 0 | 0+1 | 0 |
| 64 | DF | (Belgium) BEL | Kyriani Sabbe | 3 | 0 | 1+2 | 0 | 0 | 0 | 0 | 0 | 0 | 0 |
| 77 | DF | (Angola) ANG | Clinton Mata | 30 | 1 | 23+2 | 1 | 1 | 0 | 1 | 0 | 2+1 | 0 |
| 94 | DF | (Ivory Coast) CIV | Abakar Sylla | 27 | 1 | 16+4 | 0 | 1 | 0 | 0 | 0 | 6 | 1 |
Midfielders
| 8 | MF | (United States) USA | Owen Otasowie | 2 | 0 | 1 | 0 | 0 | 0 | 1 | 0 | 0 | 0 |
| 15 | MF | (Nigeria) NGR | Raphael Onyedika | 40 | 0 | 26+5 | 0 | 2 | 0 | 0 | 0 | 6+1 | 0 |
| 19 | MF | (Ghana) GHA | Kamal Sowah | 36 | 2 | 14+13 | 0 | 1 | 0 | 0+1 | 0 | 7 | 2 |
| 20 | MF | (Belgium) BEL | Hans Vanaken | 51 | 14 | 40 | 14 | 1+1 | 0 | 1 | 0 | 8 | 0 |
| 26 | MF | (Belgium) BEL | Mats Rits | 21 | 2 | 14+6 | 2 | 0 | 0 | 0 | 0 | 0+1 | 0 |
| 27 | MF | (Denmark) DEN | Casper Nielsen | 46 | 9 | 31+5 | 9 | 2 | 0 | 0 | 0 | 7+1 | 0 |
| 62 | MF | (Japan) JPN | Shion Homma | 2 | 1 | 0+2 | 1 | 0 | 0 | 0 | 0 | 0 | 0 |
| 68 | MF | (Belgium) BEL | Chemsdine Talbi | 5 | 0 | 0+5 | 0 | 0 | 0 | 0 | 0 | 0 | 0 |
| 89 | MF | (Belgium) BEL | Lynnt Audoor | 9 | 0 | 0+6 | 0 | 0+1 | 0 | 0+1 | 0 | 0+1 | 0 |
| 98 | MF | (Belgium) BEL | Cisse Sandra | 13 | 1 | 1+10 | 1 | 0+1 | 0 | 0 | 0 | 0+1 | 0 |
Forwards
| 7 | FW | (Denmark) DEN | Andreas Skov Olsen | 30 | 9 | 18+5 | 7 | 0+1 | 0 | 1 | 1 | 4+1 | 1 |
| 9 | FW | (Spain) ESP | Ferran Jutglà | 44 | 15 | 28+6 | 13 | 1 | 0 | 1 | 0 | 6+2 | 2 |
| 10 | FW | (Netherlands) NED | Noa Lang | 40 | 12 | 25+8 | 9 | 2 | 3 | 1 | 0 | 4 | 0 |
| 17 | FW | (Canada) CAN | Tajon Buchanan | 32 | 1 | 19+5 | 1 | 2 | 0 | 0 | 0 | 6 | 0 |
| 30 | FW | (Venezuela) VEN | Daniel Pérez | 0 | 0 | 0 | 0 | 0 | 0 | 0 | 0 | 0 | 0 |
| 32 | FW | (Norway) NOR | Antonio Nusa | 32 | 2 | 7+19 | 1 | 1 | 0 | 0+1 | 0 | 0+4 | 1 |
| 70 | FW | (Ukraine) UKR | Roman Yaremchuk | 27 | 2 | 9+14 | 2 | 0 | 0 | 0 | 0 | 1+3 | 0 |
| 76 | FW | (Belgium) BEL | Romeo Vermant | 10 | 0 | 1+9 | 0 | 0 | 0 | 0 | 0 | 0 | 0 |
Players who have made an appearance this season but have left the club
| 3 | MF | (Colombia) COL | Éder Balanta | 13 | 0 | 3+6 | 0 | 0 | 0 | 0 | 0 | 0+4 | 0 |
| 2 | DF | (Ukraine) UKR | Eduard Sobol | 14 | 1 | 5+4 | 1 | 0+1 | 0 | 0 | 0 | 1+3 | 0 |
| 4 | DF | (France) FRA | Stanley Nsoki | 2 | 0 | 2 | 0 | 0 | 0 | 0 | 0 | 0 | 0 |
| 11 | FW | (Canada) CAN | Cyle Larin | 13 | 1 | 1+8 | 1 | 1+1 | 0 | 0+1 | 0 | 0+1 | 0 |
| 25 | MF | (Netherlands) NED | Ruud Vormer | 3 | 0 | 1+1 | 0 | 0 | 0 | 1 | 0 | 0 | 0 |
| 72 | DF | (Belgium) BEL | Noah Mbamba | 3 | 0 | 1+1 | 0 | 0 | 0 | 1 | 0 | 0 | 0 |
