= 2021–22 Club Brugge KV season =

Club Brugge
2021–22 season
- President: Bart Verhaeghe
- Manager: Philippe Clement (until 3 January); Alfred Schreuder (from 3 January)
- Stadium: Jan Breydel Stadium
- First Division A: 1st
- Belgian Cup: Semi-finals
- Belgian Super Cup: Winners
- UEFA Champions League: Group stage
- Top goalscorer: League: Charles De Ketelaere (14); All: Charles De Ketelaere (18)
- Biggest win: Seraing 0–5 Club Brugge
- Biggest defeat: Gent 6–1 Club Brugge
Home colours	Away colours	Third colours

The 2021–22 season was the 130th season in the existence of Club Brugge KV and the club's 62nd consecutive season in the top flight of Belgian football. In addition to the domestic league, Club Brugge participated in this season's editions of the Belgian Cup, the Belgian Super Cup, and the UEFA Champions League.

On 17 July 2021, Club Brugge won their first trophy of the season, defeating Genk in the 2021 Belgian Super Cup.

On 15 May 2022, Club Brugge secured their third consecutive and 18th overall league title in history with a 3–1 win in Antwerp.

== Players ==
=== First-team squad ===
As of 3 February 2022

Note: Flags indicate national team as defined under FIFA eligibility rules; some limited exceptions apply. Players may hold more than one non-FIFA nationality.

No.	Pos.	Nation	Player
2	DF	UKR	Eduard Sobol
3	MF	COL	Éder Balanta
4	DF	FRA	Stanley Nsoki
5	DF	SCO	Jack Hendry
6	DF	BEL	Denis Odoi
7	FW	DEN	Andreas Skov Olsen
8	MF	USA	Owen Otasowie
9	FW	ARM	Sargis Adamyan (on loan from Hoffenheim)
10	FW	NED	Noa Lang
11	MF	FRA	Faitout Maouassa
15	DF	CRO	Matej Mitrović
17	FW	CAN	Tajon Buchanan
18	DF	URU	Federico Ricca
20	MF	BEL	Hans Vanaken (vice-captain)

No.	Pos.	Nation	Player
21	FW	COL	José Izquierdo
22	GK	BEL	Simon Mignolet
25	MF	NED	Ruud Vormer (captain)
26	MF	BEL	Mats Rits
29	FW	NED	Bas Dost
30	FW	VEN	Daniel Pérez
32	FW	NOR	Antonio Nusa
33	GK	BEL	Nick Shinton
44	DF	BEL	Brandon Mechele
72	DF	BEL	Noah Mbamba
77	DF	ANG	Clinton Mata
90	MF	BEL	Charles De Ketelaere
91	GK	BEL	Senne Lammens
98	MF	BEL	Cisse Sandra

=== Out on loan ===
No.	Pos.	Nation	Player
9	FW	CZE	Michael Krmenčík (on loan to (Czech Republic) Slavia Prague until 30 June 2022)
16	MF	BEL	Tibo Persyn (on loan to (Belgium) Westerlo until 30 June 2022)
19	MF	BEL	Thibault Vlietinck (on loan to (Belgium) OH Leuven until 30 June 2022)
21	FW	NGR	David Okereke (on loan to (Italy) Venezia until 30 June 2022)
27	FW	SEN	Youssouph Badji (on loan to (Belgium) Charleroi until 30 June 2023)

No.	Pos.	Nation	Player
55	DF	BEL	Maxim De Cuyper (on loan to (Belgium) Westerlo until 30 June 2022)
80	FW	BEL	Loïs Openda (on loan to (Netherlands) Vitesse until 30 June 2022)
97	MF	BEL	Thomas Van den Keybus (on loan to (Belgium) Westerlo until 30 June 2022)
—	MF	GHA	Kamal Sowah (on loan to (Netherlands) AZ until 30 June 2022)

== Transfers ==
=== In ===
No.	Pos	Player	Transferred from	Fee	Date	Source
	GK	(Croatia) Karlo Letica	(Italy) Sampdoria	Loan Return	30 June 2021	
2	DF	(Ukraine) Eduard Sobol	(Ukraine) Shakhtar Donetsk	€3,200,000	30 June 2021	
	DF	(Ivory Coast) Simon Deli	(Czech Republic) Slavia Prague	Loan Return	30 June 2021	
	FW	(Nigeria) Emmanuel Dennis	(Germany) FC Köln	Loan Return	30 June 2021	
	FW	(Czech Republic) Michael Krmenčík	(Greece) PAOK	Loan Return	30 June 2021	
	FW	(Iran) Kaveh Rezaei	(Belgium) Charleroi	Loan Return	30 June 2021	
16	MF	(Belgium) Tibo Persyn	(Italy) Inter Milan	Loan	29 July 2021	
8	MF	(United States) Owen Otasowie	(England) Wolverhampton Wanderers	Undisclosed	20 August 2021	
4	DF	(France) Stanley Nsoki	(France) Nice	Undisclosed	24 August 2021	
17	MF	(Canada) Tajon Buchanan	(United States) New England Revolution	Undisclosed	24 August 2021 (Note: Move takes place following completion of the 2021 MLS season)	
19	MF	(Ghana) Kamal Sowah	(England) Leicester City	Undisclosed	27 August 2021	
7	FW	(Brazil) Wesley	(England) Aston Villa	Loan	28 August 2021	
5	DF	(Scotland) Jack Hendry	(Belgium) Oostende	Undisclosed	31 August 2021	
7	FW	(Denmark) Andreas Skov Olsen	(Italy) Bologna	Undisclosed	28 January 2022	
9	FW	(Armenia) Sargis Adamyan	(Germany) 1899 Hoffenheim	Loan	31 January 2022	
6	DF	(Ghana) Denis Odoi	(England) Fulham	Undisclosed	1 February 2022	

=== Out ===
No.	Pos	Player	Transferred to	Fee	Date	Source
	FW	(Nigeria) Emmanuel Dennis	(England) Watford	Undisclosed	21 June 2021	
	FW	(Belgium) Loïs Openda	(Netherlands) SBV Vitesse	Loan	23 June 2021	
7	FW	(Netherlands) Tahith Chong	(England) Manchester United	End of loan	30 June 2021	
24	DF	(Netherlands) Stefano Denswil	(Italy) Bologna	End of loan	30 June 2021	
22	GK	(United States) Ethan Horvath	(England) Nottingham Forest	Free	13 July 2021	
5	DF	(Ivory Coast) Odilon Kossounou	(Germany) Bayer Leverkusen	€23,000,000	22 July 2021	
	FW	(Czech Republic) Michael Krmenčík	(Czech Republic) Slavia Prague	Loan	23 July 2021	
55	DF	(Belgium) Maxim De Cuyper	(Belgium) Westerlo	Loan	2 August 2021	
	FW	(Iran) Kaveh Rezaei	(Belgium) OH Leuven	Undisclosed	4 August 2021	
21	FW	(Nigeria) David Okereke	(Italy) Venezia	Loan	12 August 2021	
	MF	(Belgium) Thomas Van den Keybus	(Belgium) Westerlo	Loan	13 August 2021	
1	GK	(Croatia) Karlo Letica	(Romania) CFR Cluj	Undisclosed	11 October 2021	
7	FW	(Brazil) Wesley	(England) Aston Villa	Loan Recall	7 January 2022	
19	MF	(Ghana) Kamal Sowah	(Netherlands) AZ	Loan	31 January 2022	
28	FW	(Belgium) Ignace Van Der Brempt	(Austria) Red Bull Salzburg	Undisclosed	1 February 2022	

== Pre-season and friendlies ==
Win Draw Loss Fixtures

26 June 2021 Friendly	Club Brugge (Belgium)	1–1	(Belgium) Beerschot	Knokke-Heist, Belgium
18:00 CEST (UTC+2)	Okereke 88'	Report	Sanusi 30'	Stadium: Complex Molenhoek; Attendance: 0 Referee: Jasper Vergote

30 June 2021 Friendly	Club Brugge (Belgium)	2–1	(Croatia) Lokomotiva Zagreb	Knokke-Heist, Belgium
18:00 CEST (UTC+2)	Dost 45+1'; De Ketelaere 87'	Report	Kačavenda 11'	Stadium: Complex Molenhoek; Attendance: 0 Referee: Bram Van Driessche

3 July 2021 Friendly	Club Brugge (Belgium)	0–1	(Belgium) Kortrijk	Knokke-Heist, Belgium
19:00 CEST (UTC+2)		Report	Mujakić 90'	Stadium: Complex Molenhoek; Attendance: 0

7 July 2021 Friendly	Club Brugge (Belgium)	2–1	(Belgium) Zulte Waregem	Knokke-Heist, Belgium
18:00 CEST (UTC+2)	Pérez 67', 80'	Report	Vossen 3'	Stadium: Complex Molenhoek; Attendance: 0

9 July 2021 Friendly	Club Brugge (Belgium)	2–1	(Greece) AEK Athens	Knokke-Heist, Belgium
16:00 CEST (UTC+2)	De Ketelaere 2'; Pérez 85'	Report	Mitrović 60' (o.g.)	Stadium: Complex Molenhoek; Attendance: 0

13 July 2021 Friendly	Club Brugge (Belgium)	2–4	(Netherlands) FC Utrecht	Knokke-Heist, Belgium
18:00 CEST (UTC+2)	Rits 51'; Audoor 79'	Report	Balk 32'; Van der Kust 65'; Douvikas 76' (pen.); Gustafson 83'	Stadium: Belfius Basecamp; Attendance: 0 Referee: Christophe Windels

18 July 2021 Friendly	Club Brugge (Belgium)	3–0	(Belgium) Lierse	Knokke-Heist, Belgium
15:00 CEST (UTC+2)	Pérez 7'; Sandra 80'; Badji 84'	Report		Stadium: Complex Molenhoek; Attendance: 0

7 August 2021 Friendly	Club Brugge (Belgium)	2–1	(Belgium) Westerlo	Knokke-Heist, Belgium
14:30 CEST (UTC+2)				Stadium: Complex Molenhoek

16 August 2021 Friendly	Club Brugge (Belgium)	7–2	(Belgium) Deinze	Knokke-Heist, Belgium
14:30 CEST (UTC+2)				Stadium: Complex Molenhoek

5 January 2022 Friendly	Club Brugge (Belgium)	0–0	(Germany) Karlsruher SC	San Pedro de Alcántara, Spain
15:30 CET (UTC+1)				Stadium: Marbella Football Center - Sur 1

8 January 2022 Friendly	Puskás Akadémia (Hungary)	0–1	(Belgium) Club Brugge	Sotogrande, Spain
12:30 CET (UTC+1)				Stadium: Santa Maria Polo Cancha

8 January 2022 Friendly	Feyenoord (Netherlands)	Cancelled	(Belgium) Club Brugge	San Pedro de Alcántara, Spain
12:30 CET (UTC+1)				Stadium: Marbella Football Center - Sur 1

16 April 2022 Friendly	Oostende (Belgium)	1–3	(Belgium) Club Brugge	Ostend, Belgium
12:00 CEST (UTC+2)	Ambrose 9'		De Ketelaere 1'; Adamyan 47'; Ricca 68'	Stadium: Diaz Arena

== Competitions ==
=== Overall record ===
Competition	First match	Last match	Starting round	Final position	Record							
Competition	First match	Last match	Starting round	Final position	Pld	W	D	L	GF	GA	GD	Win %
Belgian First Division A	25 July 2021	22 May 2022	Matchday 1	Winners	40	25	11	4	80	39	+41	62.50
Belgian Cup	27 October 2021	2 March 2022	Sixth round	Semi-finals	5	3	1	1	11	7	+4	60.00
Belgian Super Cup	17 July 2021		Final	Winners	1	1	0	0	3	2	+1	100.00
UEFA Champions League	15 September 2021	7 December 2021	Group stage	Group stage	6	1	1	4	6	20	−14	16.67
Total					52	30	13	9	100	68	+32	57.69

Last updated: 22 May 2022
Source: Soccerway

=== First Division A ===
==== League table ====
Pos	Team	Pld	W	D	L	GF	GA	GD	Pts	Qualification or relegation
1	Union SG	34	24	5	5	78	27	+51	77	Qualification for the Europa Conference League and Play-offs I (Note: The regular season winners will qualify for the 2022–23 UEFA Europa Conference League if they do not qualify for the 2022–23 UEFA Champions League in the playoffs.)
2	Club Brugge (C)	34	21	9	4	72	37	+35	72	Qualification for the Play-offs I
3	Anderlecht	34	18	10	6	72	36	+36	64	Qualification for the Play-offs I
4	Antwerp	34	19	6	9	55	38	+17	63	Qualification for the Play-offs I
5	Gent	34	18	8	8	56	30	+26	62	Qualification for the Play-offs II

Source: Jupiler Pro League (in Dutch), Soccerway
Rules for classification: 1) Points; 2) Matches won; 3) Goal difference; 4) Goals scored; 5) Away matches won; 6) Away goal difference; 7) Away goals scored; 8) Play-off.
(C) Champions

==== Results summary ====
Overall								Home						Away					
Pld	W	D	L	GF	GA	GD	Pts	W	D	L	GF	GA	GD	W	D	L	GF	GA	GD
34	21	9	4	72	37	+35	72	10	6	1	36	16	+20	11	3	3	36	21	+15

Last updated: 10 April 2022.
Source: Jupiler Pro League

==== Results by round ====
Round	1	2	3	4	5	6	7	8	9	10	11	12	13	14	15	16	17	18	19	20	21	22	23	24	25	26	27	28	29	30	31	32	33	34
Ground	H	A	H	A	H	A	H	A	H	A	H	A	A	H	A	A	H	H	A	H	A	H	A	H	A	H	H	A	H	A	A	H	A	H
Result	D	W	D	W	W	L	W	W	D	D	W	D	W	D	L	W	W	W	W	D	L	W	D	D	W	L	W	W	W	W	W	W	W	W
Position	7	4	6	3	2	3	1	1	4	4	2	2	2	3	3	3	3	2	2	2	2	2	2	2	2	3	3	2	2	2	2	2	2	2

Updated to match(es) played on 10 April 2022. Source: Jupiler Pro League
A = Away; H = Home; W = Win; D = Draw; L = Loss

==== Matches ====
The league fixtures were announced on 8 June 2021.

25 July 2021 1	Club Brugge	2–2	Eupen	Bruges
20:45 CEST (UTC+2)	Vormer (yellow card) 40'; Dost 56' (pen.); Lang (yellow card) 85'; Pérez (yellow card) 85'; De Ketelaere 90+13'	Report	Heris (yellow card) 34'; Agbadou (yellow card) 55'; Kayembe 60'; Ngoy 77'; Beck (yellow card) 85'; Nuhu (yellow card) 90+3'; Cools (yellow card) 90+4'; Déom (yellow card) 90+5'; Prevljak (yellow card) 90+14'	Stadium: Jan Breydel Stadium; Attendance: 10,000; Referee: Bram Van Driessche

1 August 2021 2	Union Saint-Gilloise	0–1	Club Brugge	Brussels
13:30 CEST (UTC+2)	Avenatti (yellow card) 37'; Van der Heyden (yellow card) 80'	Report	Nsoki (yellow card) 82'; Sobol 84'; Pérez (yellow card) 90'	Stadium: Stade Joseph Marien; Attendance: 3,200; Referee: Wim Smet

6 August 2021 3	Club Brugge	1–1	Cercle Brugge	Bruges
20:45 CEST (UTC+2)	Vormer 35'	Report	Waldo 90+1'	Stadium: Jan Breydel Stadium; Attendance: 10,000; Referee: Kevin Van Damme

15 August 2021 4	Zulte Waregem	0–4	Club Brugge	Waregem
21:00 CEST (UTC+2)		Report	Lang 42'; Vormer 65'; Vanaken 69'; De Ketelaere 75'	Stadium: Regenboogstadion; Attendance: 4,580; Referee: Lawrence Visser

22 August 2021 5	Club Brugge	3–2	Beerschot	Bruges
18:30 CEST (UTC+2)	Álvarez 4'; De Ketelaere 30'; Persyn 55'	Report	Dom 37'; Van den Bergh 76'	Stadium: Jan Breydel Stadium; Attendance: 26,000; Referee: Lothar D'hondt

29 August 2021 6	Gent	6–1	Club Brugge	Ghent
13:30 CEST (UTC+2)	Tissoudali 9'; De Sart 15' (pen.); Fortuna 38'; Bezus 61'; Depoitre 66'; Mignolet 79' (o.g.)	Report	Vanaken 65'	Stadium: Ghelamco Arena; Referee: Erik Lambrechts

10 September 2021 7	Club Brugge	3–0	Oostende	Bruges
20:45 CEST (UTC+2)	Lang 23' 80'; Vanaken 56'	Report	Steven Fortès (red card) 45'; Bätzner (yellow card) 48'; Gueye (yellow card) 56'; Kenny Rocha Santos (yellow card) 70'	Stadium: Jan Breydel Stadium; Attendance: 26,000; Referee: (Belgium) Nathan Verboomen

18 September 2021 8	Charleroi	0–1	Club Brugge	Charleroi
20:45 CEST (UTC+2)	Kayembe (yellow card) 62'	Report	De Ketelaere (yellow card) 60' (goal) 90+2'; Balanta (yellow card) 87'	Stadium: Stade du Pays de Charleroi; Attendance: 8,554; Referee: (Belgium) Jonathan Lardot

24 September 2021 9	Club Brugge	1–1	OH Leuven	Bruges
CEST (UTC+2)				Stadium: Jan Breydel Stadium

3 October 2021 10	Anderlecht	1–1	Club Brugge	Anderlecht
13:30 CEST (UTC+2)				Stadium: Constant Vanden Stock Stadium; Referee: Lawrence Visser

15 October 2021 11	Club Brugge	2–0	Kortrijk	Bruges
CEST (UTC+2)				Stadium: Jan Breydel Stadium

24 October 2021 12	Antwerp	1–1	Club Brugge	Antwerp
13:30 CEST (UTC+2)	Engels (yellow card) 21', (goal) 35', (red card) 82'; De Laet (yellow card) 39'	Report	Mata (yellow card) 2'; Balanta (yellow card) 39'; Vanaken 45+2'; N'Soki (yellow card) 59' (yellow-red card) 90'	Stadium: Bosuilstadion; Attendance: 15,734; Referee: Nathan Verboomen

30 October 2021 13	Sint-Truiden	1–2	Club Brugge	Sint-Truiden
20:45 CEST (UTC+2)	Bauer 23'	Report	Dost 1', 49'	Stadium: Stayen; Attendance: 6,000; Referee: Bram Van Driessche

7 November 2021 14	Club Brugge	2–2	Standard Liège	Bruges
13:30 CET (UTC+1)	Dost 15'; De Ketelaere 35'	Report	Dønnum 39'; Dussenne 52' (pen.)	Stadium: Jan Breydel Stadium; Attendance: 26,305; Referee: Lothar D'hondt

19 November 2021 15	Mechelen	2–1	Club Brugge	Mechelen
20:45 CET (UTC+1)		Report		Stadium: Achter de Kazerne; Attendance: 16,254; Referee: Nathan Verboomen

28 November 2021 16	Genk	2–3	Club Brugge	Genk
13:30 CET (UTC+1)		Report		Stadium: Luminus Arena; Attendance: 16,000; Referee: Lawrence Visser

4 December 2021 17	Club Brugge	3–2	Seraing	Bruges
20:45 CET (UTC+1)	Bas Dost 17' (pen.), 30'; Sandra 44'	Report	Jallow 42'; Del Fabro 45+1'	Stadium: Jan Breydel Stadium; Attendance: 24,100; Referee: Alexandre Boucaut

12 December 2021 18	Club Brugge	3–0	Zulte Waregem	Bruges
21:00 CET (UTC+1)		Report		Stadium: Jan Breydel Stadium; Attendance: 16,323; Referee: Wim Smet

15 December 2021 19	OH Leuven	1–4	Club Brugge	Leuven
21:00 CET (UTC+1)		Report		Stadium: Den Dreef; Attendance: 8,643; Referee: Lawrence Visser

19 December 2021 20	Club Brugge	2–2	Anderlecht	Bruges
13:30 CET (UTC+1)	De Ketelaere 9'; Vanaken 85'	Report	Amuzu 73'; Hoedt 80'	Stadium: Jan Breydel Stadium; Attendance: 28,000; Referee: Nathan Verboomen

26 December 2021 21	Cercle Brugge	2–0	Club Brugge	Bruges
13:30 CET (UTC+1)	Miangue 53'; Albino 90'	Report	Lang (yellow card) 26' (yellow-red card) 90+4'	Stadium: Jan Breydel Stadium; Attendance: 0 Referee: Nicolas Laforge

15 January 2022 22	Club Brugge	2–0	Sint-Truiden	Bruges
20:45 CET (UTC+1)	De Ketelaere 29'; Dost 64'	Report		Stadium: Jan Breydel Stadium; Attendance: 0 Referee: Erik Lambrechts

23 January 2022 23	Standard Liège	2–2	Club Brugge	Liège
13:30 CET (UTC+1)	Cafaro 10'; Emond 48'	Report	Dost 40', 59'	Stadium: Stade Maurice Dufrasne; Attendance: 0 Referee: Jonathan Lardot

27 January 2022 24	Club Brugge	0–0	Union Saint-Gilloise	Bruges
20:45 CET (UTC+1)		Report		Stadium: Jan Breydel Stadium; Attendance: 0 Referee: Lawrence Visser

30 January 2022 25	Kortrijk	0–1	Club Brugge	Kortrijk
21:00 CET (UTC+1)		Report	Dost 54'	Stadium: Guldensporen Stadion; Attendance: 6,214; Referee: Alexandre Boucaut

6 February 2022 26	Club Brugge	1–2	Gent	Bruges
13:30 CET (UTC+1)	De Ketelaere 76'	Report	Hjulsager 36'; Tissoudali 67'	Stadium: Jan Breydel Stadium; Attendance: 14,647; Referee: Nicolas Laforge

13 February 2022 27	Club Brugge	2–0	Charleroi	Bruges
18:30 CET (UTC+1)	Rits 36', 57'	Report		Stadium: Jan Breydel Stadium; Attendance: 15,000; Referee: Erik Lambrechts

20 February 2022 28	Eupen	1–3	Club Brugge	Eupen
16:00 CET (UTC+1)	Prevljak 62'	Report	Vanaken 8'; De Ketelaere 57'; Adamyan 90'	Stadium: Kehrwegstadion; Attendance: 3,087; Referee: Jan Boterberg

27 February 2022 29	Club Brugge	4–1	Antwerp	Bruges
13:30 CET (UTC+1)	Odoi 31'; Vanaken 37' (pen.), (yellow card) 87'; Rits (yellow card) 43'; Adamyan (yellow card) 54', (goal) 59'; Skov Olsen 64'	Report	Frey 29'; B. Verstraete (yellow card) 36'; Haroun (yellow card) 90+2'	Stadium: Jan Breydel Stadium; Attendance: 23,157; Referee: Lawrence Visser

5 March 2022 30	Seraing	0–5	Club Brugge	Seraing
20:45 CET (UTC+1)		Report	Skov Olsen 3', 83'; Rits 29'; Dyrestam 45' (o.g.); Dost 73'	Stadium: Stade du Pairay; Attendance: 2,400; Referee: Bram Van Driessche

12 March 2022 31	Oostende	1–3	Club Brugge	Ostend
20:45 CET (UTC+1)	Jäkel 22'	Report	Adamyan 17', 32'; Skov Olsen 63'	Stadium: Diaz Arena; Attendance: 6,402; Referee: Alexandre Boucaut

20 March 2022 32	Club Brugge	3–1	Genk	Bruges
13:30 CET (UTC+1)	Vanaken 4'; De Ketelaere 49'; Adamyan 74'	Report	Ito 39'	Stadium: Jan Breydel Stadium; Attendance: 21,496; Referee: Nicolas Laforge

1 April 2022 33	Beerschot	1–3	Club Brugge	Antwerp
20:45 CEST (UTC+2)	Shankland 66' (pen.)	Report	Lang 19'; Rits 49'; De Ketelaere 54'	Stadium: Olympic Stadium; Referee: Bert Put

10 April 2022 34	Club Brugge	2–0	Mechelen	Bruges
18:30 CEST (UTC+2)	Rits 32'; Skov Olsen 76'	Report		Stadium: Jan Breydel Stadium; Attendance: 21,802; Referee: Bram Van Driessche

==== Play-Off I ====
Pos	Team	Pld	W	D	L	GF	GA	GD	Pts	Qualification or relegation	CLU	USG	AND	ANT
1	Club Brugge (C)	6	4	2	0	8	2	+6	50	Qualification for the Champions League group stage	—	1–0	1–1	1–0
2	Union SG	6	2	1	3	5	5	0	46	Qualification for the Champions League third qualifying round	0–2	—	3–1	0–1
3	Anderlecht	6	2	2	2	8	7	+1	40	Qualification for the Europa Conference League third qualifying round	0–0	0–2	—	2–1
4	Antwerp	6	1	1	4	3	10	−7	36	Qualification for the Europa Conference League second qualifying round	1–3	0–0	0–4	—

Source: Jupiler Pro League (in Dutch), Soccerway
Legend: Blue = home team win; Yellow = draw; Red = away team win.
Rules for classification: 1) Points; 2) Points without (possible) half points added due to rounding; 3) Regular season finishing position.
(C) Champions

==== Results summary ====
Overall								Home						Away					
Pld	W	D	L	GF	GA	GD	Pts	W	D	L	GF	GA	GD	W	D	L	GF	GA	GD
6	4	2	0	8	2	+6	14	2	1	0	3	1	+2	2	1	0	5	1	+4

Last updated: 22 May 2022.
Source: Jupiler Pro League

==== Results by round ====
Round	1	2	3	4	5	6
Ground	H	A	A	H	A	H
Result	W	D	W	W	W	D
Position	2	2	1	1	1	1

Updated to match(es) played on 22 May 2022. Source: Jupiler Pro League
A = Away; H = Home; W = Win; D = Draw; L = Loss

==== Matches ====
24 April 2022 1	Club Brugge	1–0	Antwerp	Bruges
13:30 CEST (UTC+2)	Buchanan 37'; Nsoki (yellow card) 59'	Report	Nainggolan (yellow card) 29'; Dessoleil (yellow card) 41'; Seck (yellow card) 71' (yellow-red card) 90'; De Laet (yellow card) 78'	Stadium: Jan Breydel Stadium; Attendance: 24,616; Referee: Erik Lambrechts

1 May 2022 2	Anderlecht	0–0	Club Brugge	Anderlecht
18:30 CEST (UTC+2)	Magallán (yellow card) 14'; Kouamé (yellow card) 86'	Report	Nsoki (yellow card) 73'; Balanta (yellow card) 86'	Stadium: Constant Vanden Stock Stadium; Attendance: 19,000; Referee: Nathan Verboomen

8 May 2022 3	Union Saint-Gilloise	0–2	Club Brugge	Brussels
13:30 CEST (UTC+2)	Teuma (yellow card) 5'; Vanzeir (penalty missed) 55'; Lapoussin (yellow card) 59'; Mitoma (yellow card) 78'; Undav (yellow card) 90+1'	Report	Mata (yellow card) 40'; Odoi (yellow card) 57'; Vanaken 74'; Nsoki (yellow card) 90+1'; Sobol (yellow card) 90+5'; Nusa 90+8'	Stadium: Stade Joseph Marien; Attendance: 9,000; Referee: Lawrence Visser

11 May 2022 4	Club Brugge	1–0	Union Saint-Gilloise	Bruges
20:30 CEST (UTC+2)	Balanta (yellow card) 35'; Moris 65' (o.g.); Mignolet (yellow card) 76'; Buchanan (yellow card) 83' (yellow-red card) 90+3'	Report	Machida (yellow card) 12' (yellow-red card) 59'; Lazare (yellow card) 18'; Nielsen (yellow card) 77'	Stadium: Jan Breydel Stadium; Referee: Erik Lambrechts

15 May 2022 5	Antwerp	1–3	Club Brugge	Antwerp
13:30 CEST (UTC+2)	Frey 19'	Report	Vanaken 49' (pen.); Hendry 64'; Adamyan 66'	Stadium: Bosuilstadion; Attendance: 15,126; Referee: Lawrence Visser

22 May 2022 6	Club Brugge	1–1	Anderlecht	Bruges
18:30 CEST (UTC+2)	Skov Olsen 39'	Report	Hendry 87' (o.g.)	Stadium: Jan Breydel Stadium; Referee: Lothar D'Hondt

=== Belgian Cup ===
27 October 2021 Sixth round	Club Brugge	3–0	Deinze	Bruges
20:45 CEST (UTC+2)	Izquierdo 48'; Dost 74', 77'			Stadium: Jan Breydelstadion

1 December 2021 Seventh round	Genk	3–3 (a.e.t.) (3–5 p)	Club Brugge	Genk
20:45 CET (UTC+1)	Thorstvedt 29'; Paintsil 45+2', 71'		Balanta 7'; De Ketelaere 69', 90'	Stadium: Cegeka Arena
	Penalties
	Hrošovský (penalty missed); Lucumí (penalty scored); Bongonda (penalty scored); Thorstvedt (penalty scored)		(penalty scored) Dost; (penalty scored) De Ketelaere; (penalty scored) Rits; (penalty scored) Ricca; (penalty scored) Lang

23 December 2021 Quarter-finals	Club Brugge	4–1	OH Leuven	Bruges
21:00 CET (UTC+1)	De Ketelaere 41'; Balanta 45+6'; Lang 65'; Vanaken 90+2'		Mercier 59'	Stadium: Jan Breydel Stadium; Referee: Bram van Driessche

2 February 2022 Semi-finals; First leg	Gent	0–1	Club Brugge	Ghent
20:45 CET (UTC+1)			De Ketelaere 56'	Stadium: Ghelamco Arena; Referee: Nathan Verboomen

2 March 2022 Semi-finals; Second leg	Club Brugge	0–3 (1–3 agg.)	Gent	Bruges
20:45 CET (UTC+1)			Odjidja-Ofoe 3'; Castro-Montes 36'; Depoitre 55'	Stadium: Jan Breydel Stadium; Attendance: 20,000; Referee: Erik Lambrechts

=== Belgian Super Cup ===
17 July 2021 Final	Club Brugge	3–2	Genk	Bruges
20:45 CEST (UTC+2)	Mitrović 45+3'; Lang 48' (pen.), (yellow card) 49'; Mata 50'; De Ketelaere (yellow card) 65'	Report	Bongonda 44'; Uronen 90+3'	Stadium: Jan Breydel Stadium; Attendance: 10,000; Referee: Jonathan Lardot

=== UEFA Champions League ===
==== Group stage ====
The draw for the group stage was held on 26 August 2021.

Pos	Team	Pld	W	D	L	GF	GA	GD	Pts	Qualification	MCI	PAR	RBL	BRU
1	(England) Manchester City	6	4	0	2	18	10	+8	12	Advance to knockout phase	—	2–1	6–3	4–1
2	(France) Paris Saint-Germain	6	3	2	1	13	8	+5	11	Advance to knockout phase	2–0	—	3–2	4–1
3	(Germany) RB Leipzig	6	2	1	3	15	14	+1	7	Transfer to Europa League	2–1	2–2	—	1–2
4	(Belgium) Club Brugge	6	1	1	4	6	20	−14	4		1–5	1–1	0–5	—

Source: UEFA
Rules for classification: Group stage tiebreakers

15 September 2021 1	Club Brugge (Belgium)	1–1	(France) Paris Saint-Germain	Bruges, Belgium
21:00 CEST (UTC+2)	Vanaken 27'; Lang (yellow card) 62'; Balanta (yellow card) 76'	Report	Paredes (yellow card) 12'; Herrera 15'; Messi (yellow card) 72'	Stadium: Jan Breydel Stadium; Attendance: 27,546; Referee: Sandro Schärer (Switzerland)

28 September 2021 2	RB Leipzig (Germany)	1–2	(Belgium) Club Brugge	Leipzig, Germany
21:00 CEST (UTC+2)	Nkunku 5'	Report	Vanaken 22'; Rits 41'; Balanta (yellow card) 87'; Mignolet (yellow card) 90+6'	Stadium: Red Bull Arena; Attendance: 23,500; Referee: Slavko Vinčić (Slovenia)

19 October 2021 3	Club Brugge (Belgium)	1–5	(England) Manchester City	Bruges, Belgium
18:45 CEST (UTC+1)	Mata (yellow card) 24'; Nsoki (yellow card) 45'; Balanta (yellow card) 65'; Vanaken 81'	Report	Cancelo 30'; Laporte (yellow card) 32'; Mahrez 43' (pen.), 84'; Walker 53'; Palmer 67'	Stadium: Jan Breydel Stadium; Attendance: 24,915; Referee: István Kovács (Romania)

3 November 2021 4	Manchester City (England)	4–1	(Belgium) Club Brugge	Manchester, England
21:00 BST (UTC+1)	Foden 15'; Mahrez 45'; Sterling 72'; Gabriel Jesus 90+2'	Report	Stones 17' (o.g.)	Stadium: City of Manchester Stadium; Attendance: 50,228; Referee: Antonio Mateu Lahoz (Spain)

24 November 2021 5	Club Brugge (Belgium)	0–5	(Germany) RB Leipzig	Bruges, Belgium
21:00 CET (UTC+1)	Lang (yellow card) 63'; Balanta (yellow card) 85'; Wesley (yellow card) 86'	Report	Nkunku 12', 90+3'; Forsberg 17' (pen.), 45+1'; Silva 26'; Moriba (yellow card) 86'	Stadium: Jan Breydel Stadium; Attendance: 24,072; Referee: Davide Massa (Italy)

7 December 2021 6	Paris Saint-Germain (France)	4–1	(Belgium) Club Brugge	Paris, France
18:45 CET (UTC+1)	Mbappé 2', 7', (yellow card) 70'; Messi 38', 76' (pen.); Kehrer (yellow card) 55'	Report	Lang (yellow card) 61'; Rits 68'	Stadium: Parc de Princes; Attendance: 47,492; Referee: Jesús Gil Manzano (Spain)

== Statistics ==
=== Squad appearances and goals ===
Last updated on 22 May 2022

No.	Pos	Nat	Player	Total		Belgian Division		Belgian Cup		Belgian Super Cup		UEFA Champions League	
No.	Pos	Nat	Player	Apps	Goals	Apps	Goals	Apps	Goals	Apps	Goals	Apps	Goals
Goalkeepers
22	GK	(Belgium) BEL	Simon Mignolet	49	0	39	0	4	0	0	0	6	0
33	GK	(Belgium) BEL	Nick Shinton	0	0	0	0	0	0	0	0	0	0
91	GK	(Belgium) BEL	Senne Lammens	4	0	1+1	0	1	0	1	0	0	0
Defenders
2	DF	(Ukraine) UKR	Eduard Sobol	36	1	20+8	1	3+1	0	0	0	4	0
4	DF	(France) FRA	Stanley Nsoki	40	0	30+1	0	3	0	0	0	6	0
5	DF	(Scotland) SCO	Jack Hendry	32	1	18+5	1	3	0	0	0	6	0
6	DF	(Ghana) GHA	Denis Odoi	16	1	13+1	1	1+1	0	0	0	0	0
15	DF	(Croatia) CRO	Matej Mitrović	6	1	3+1	0	1	0	1	1	0	0
18	DF	(Uruguay) URU	Federico Ricca	19	1	4+6	1	0+4	0	1	0	1+3	0
44	DF	(Belgium) BEL	Brandon Mechele	46	0	34+4	0	4	0	1	0	1+2	0
72	DF	(Belgium) BEL	Noah Mbamba	21	0	3+11	0	1+2	0	1	0	0+3	0
77	DF	(Angola) ANG	Clinton Mata	50	2	38	1	5	0	1	1	6	0
94	DF	(Ivory Coast) CIV	Loubadhe Abakar Sylla	1	0	0+1	0	0	0	0	0	0	0
Midfielders
3	MF	(Colombia) COL	Éder Balanta	37	3	21+8	1	2+1	2	0+1	0	4	0
8	MF	(United States) USA	Owen Otasowie	0	0	0	0	0	0	0	0	0	0
11	MF	(France) FRA	Faitout Maouassa	9	0	4+3	0	1	0	0	0	0+1	0
20	MF	(Belgium) BEL	Hans Vanaken	50	14	36+3	11	4+1	1	0	0	6	2
25	MF	(Netherlands) NED	Ruud Vormer	36	5	22+7	5	3	0	0	0	1+3	0
26	MF	(Belgium) BEL	Mats Rits	45	9	26+7	7	4+1	0	1	0	5+1	2
90	MF	(Belgium) BEL	Charles De Ketelaere	49	18	37+2	14	3	4	1	0	6	0
98	MF	(Belgium) BEL	Cisse Sandra	12	1	2+5	1	1+2	0	0+1	0	1	0
Forwards
7	FW	(Denmark) DEN	Andreas Skov Olsen	17	6	12+3	6	1+1	0	0	0	0	0
9	FW	(Armenia) ARM	Sargis Adamyan	16	6	7+8	6	1	0	0	0	0	0
10	FW	(Netherlands) NED	Noa Lang	48	9	33+4	7	3+1	1	1	1	6	0
17	FW	(Canada) CAN	Tajon Buchanan	15	1	13+1	1	1	0	0	0	0	0
21	FW	(Colombia) COL	José Izquierdo	4	1	0+2	0	1	1	0	0	0+1	0
29	FW	(Netherlands) NED	Bas Dost	35	14	11+15	12	2+3	2	1	0	1+2	0
30	FW	(Venezuela) VEN	Daniel Pérez	6	0	0+4	0	0+1	0	0+1	0	0	0
32	FW	(Norway) NOR	Antonio Nusa	4	1	1+2	1	0+1	0	0	0	0	0
Players who have made an appearance this season but have left the club
1	GK	(Croatia) CRO	Karlo Letica	0	0	0	0	0	0	0	0	0	0
5	DF	(Ivory Coast) CIV	Simon Deli	1	0	0	0	0	0	1	0	0	0
7	FW	(Brazil) BRA	Wesley	6	0	1+2	0	0+1	0	0	0	0+2	0
14	FW	(France) FRA	Ruben Providence	0	0	0	0	0	0	0	0	0	0
16	MF	(Belgium) BEL	Tibo Persyn	2	1	1+1	1	0	0	0	0	0	0
19	MF	(Ghana) GHA	Kamal Sowah	17	0	5+4	0	2+1	0	0	0	4+1	0
21	FW	(Nigeria) NGR	David Okereke	1	0	1	0	0	0	0	0	0	0
28	DF	(Belgium) BEL	Ignace Van Der Brempt	20	0	4+8	0	0+2	0	0+1	0	1+4	0
55	MF	(Belgium) BEL	Maxim De Cuyper	0	0	0	0	0	0	0	0	0	0
97	MF	(Belgium) BEL	Thomas Van den Keybus	0	0	0	0	0	0	0	0	0	0

=== Goal scorers ===
As of 29 August 2021

Rank	No.	Pos	Nat	Name	Pro League	Belgian Cup	Belgian Super Cup	Champions League	Total
1	90	MF	(Belgium)	Charles De Ketelaere	3	0	0	0	3
2	10	FW	(Netherlands)	Noa Lang	1	0	1	0	2
2	20	MF	(Belgium)	Hans Vanaken	2	0	0	0	2
2	25	MF	(Netherlands)	Ruud Vormer	2	0	0	0	2
5	2	DF	(Ukraine)	Eduard Sobol	1	0	0	0	1
5	3	MF	(Colombia)	Éder Álvarez Balanta	1	0	0	0	1
5	15	DF	(Croatia)	Matej Mitrović	0	0	1	0	1
5	16	MF	(Belgium)	Tibo Persyn	1	0	0	0	1
5	29	FW	(Netherlands)	Bas Dost	1	0	0	0	1
5	77	DF	(Belgium)	Clinton Mata	0	0	1	0	1
Own goal					0	0	0	0	0
Total					12	0	3	0	15

=== Clean sheets ===
As of 15 August 2021

Rank	No.	Pos	Nat	Name	Pro League	Belgian Cup	Belgian Super Cup	Champions League	Total
1	22	GK	(Belgium)	Simon Mignolet	2	0	0	0	2
Totals					2	0	0	0	2
