= 2022 Belgian Super Cup =

Club Brugge	Gent
League winners	Cup winners
1	0
- Date: 17 July 2022
- Venue: Jan Breydel Stadium, Bruges
- Referee: Erik Lambrechts
- Attendance: 18,166
- Weather: Sunny

The 2022 Belgian Super Cup was a football match that took place on 17 July 2022 between Club Brugge, the winners of the 2021–22 Belgian First Division A, and Gent, the winners of the 2021–22 Belgian Cup. Club Brugge played its 20th Belgian Super Cup, having won 16 of the 19 previous occasions. Gent appeared for the fourth time, winning once before, against Club Brugge in 2015 Belgian Super Cup.

== Pre-match ==
During the pre-match press conference by Gent, manager Hein Vanhaezebrouck stated that to him the match was considered a friendly game, as he complained the match was not being played on neutral ground, meaning it appeared to be the pre-season Bruges Matins rather than an official duel. Furthermore, he noted that while he was still suspended for one match following a red card during a match of their previous season, this suspension this not apply for the Super Cup, again making it seem as it was regarded more as a friendly. Gent midfielder Sven Kums did however state it was still an award which could be won, and the willingness to win it as a result. From a personnel perspective, the only first team newcomer for Gent to look out for was Hugo Cuypers, while the most notable leavers included Sinan Bolat, Roman Bezus, Jordan Torunarigha and Yonas Malede.

League champions Club Brugge had undergone quite some changes compared to the end of last season. Former player Carl Hoefkens had been appointed manager following the departure of Alfred Schreuder and several transfers had taken place already, most notably strikers Ferran Jutglà and Cyle Larin had been signed to replace the departures of Sargis Adamyan and Bas Dost. Fan-favorites Charles De Ketelaere and Noa Lang were still with the club, despite both considered to probably be leaving over the summer. Lang had explicitly mentioned he would move to a bigger club, while interest from AC Milan was noted for De Ketelaere. Hoefkens stated that he definitely did not consider the match to be a preparation match, as the clear intention was to win, but that in reality with most of the internationals only back on the training pitch for about two weeks, it did serve as preparation for them in the end.

== Match ==
=== Summary ===
Club Brugge started with newcomers Bjorn Meijer and Ferran Jutglà in the lineup. Ruud Vormer nearly scored the opening goal, but was denied by a save by Davy Roef. Gent replied with a cross by Hugo Cupers and a shot by Núrio Fortuna. With over 30 minutes played, Tarik Tissoudali managed to put the ball into the net for Gent, after an assist by Andrew Hjulsager, but the goal was disallowed for offside. Just a few minutes later, Andreas Skov Olsen shot for Club Brugge; it deflected off the foot of Michael Ngadeu-Ngadjui.

Gent had some minor attempts in the second half, but Club Brugge held on to win the Belgian Super Cup for a record 17th time.

=== Details ===
17 July 2022
18:00 CEST

Club Brugge	1–0	Gent
Skov Olsen 39'	Report

Jan Breydel Stadium
Attendance: 18,166
Referee: Erik Lambrechts

Club Brugge	Gent

GK	22	(Belgium) Simon Mignolet
CB	77	(Angola) Clinton Mata
CB	44	(Belgium) Brandon Mechele
CB	8	(United States) Owen Otasowie		(substituted off) 59'
RW	7	(Denmark) Andreas Skov Olsen		(substituted off) 59'
MF	25	(Netherlands) Ruud Vormer (c)
MF	72	(Belgium) Noah Mbamba		(substituted off) 66'
MF	20	(Belgium) Hans Vanaken
LW	14	(Netherlands) Bjorn Meijer	(yellow card) 72'	(substituted off) 83'
CF	10	(Netherlands) Noa Lang
CF	9	(Spain) Ferran Jutglà	(yellow card) 58'	(substituted off) 66'
Substitutes:
DF	6	(Ghana) Denis Odoi		(substituted on) 59'
CF	11	(Canada) Cyle Larin		(substituted on) 66'
MF	19	(Ghana) Kamal Sowah		(substituted on) 83'
CF	32	(Norway) Antonio Nusa		(substituted on) 59'
MF	89	(Belgium) Lynnt Audoor		(substituted on) 66'
GK	33	(Belgium) Nick Shinton
MF	90	(Belgium) Charles De Ketelaere
GK	91	(Belgium) Senne Lammens
Manager:
(Belgium) Carl Hoefkens

GK	33	(Belgium) Davy Roef
CB	21	(Norway) Andreas Hanche-Olsen	(yellow card) 76'
CB	2	(Kenya) Joseph Okumu
CB	5	(Cameroon) Michael Ngadeu-Ngadjui	(yellow card) 52'
RW	18	(Belgium) Matisse Samoise	(yellow card) 90+4'
MF	14	(Belgium) Alessio Castro-Montes		(substituted off) 46'
MF	24	(Belgium) Sven Kums (c)		(substituted off) 90+5'
MF	17	(Denmark) Andrew Hjulsager		(substituted off) 84'
LW	25	(Angola) Núrio Fortuna	(yellow card) 90+2'
CF	11	(Belgium) Hugo Cuypers
CF	34	(Morocco) Tarik Tissoudali
Substitutes:
MF	9	(The Gambia) Sulayman Marreh		(substituted on) 46'
FW	17	(Serbia) Darko Lemajić		(substituted on) 84'
MF	20	(Belgium) Malick Fofana		(substituted on) 90+5'
GK	30	(Belgium) Célestin De Schrevel
DF	31	(Belgium) Bruno Godeau
Manager:
(Belgium) Hein Vanhaezebrouck

Match rules

- 90 minutes.
- 30 minutes of extra time if necessary.
- Penalty shoot-out if scores still level.
- Maximum of ten named substitutes.
- Maximum of five substitutions.

== See also ==
- 2022–23 Belgian First Division A
- 2022–23 Belgian Cup
