= Andreas Skov Olsen =

Danish footballer (born 1999)

Personal information
- Full name: Andreas Skov Olsen
- Date of birth: 29 December 1999 (age 26)
- Place of birth: Hillerød, Denmark
- Height: 1.87 m (6 ft 2 in)
- Position: Right winger

Team information
- Current team: İstanbul Başakşehir (on loan from VfL Wolfsburg)
- Number: 70

Youth career
- Alsønderup SG&I
- 2012–2018: Nordsjælland

Senior career*
Years	Team	Apps	(Gls)
2017–2019	Nordsjælland	41	(22)
2019–2022	Bologna	70	(3)
2022–2025	Club Brugge	90	(35)
2025–	VfL Wolfsburg	21	(2)
2026	→ Rangers (loan)	9	(1)
2026–	→ İstanbul Başakşehir (loan)	6	(1)

International career^{‡}
2017	Denmark U18	1	(0)
2017–2018	Denmark U19	10	(7)
2017–2020	Denmark U21	18	(9)
2020–	Denmark	42	(8)
- * Club domestic league appearances and goals as of 21:02, 27 September 2026 (UTC) ‡ National team caps and goals as of 22:50, 14 November 2026 (UTC)

Andreas Skov Olsen (Danish pronunciation: [ˈskʌwˀ ˈoˀlsn̩]; born 29 December 1999) is a Danish professional footballer who plays as a right winger for Süper Lig club İstanbul Başakşehir, on loan from 2. Bundesliga club VfL Wolfsburg, and the Denmark national team.

== Youth career ==
Olsen started his career at local club, ASGI from Alsønderup, outside of Hillerød, but later joined the FC Nordsjælland at the age of 12.

== Club career ==
=== Nordsjælland ===
Already at the age of 17, Olsen was called up by the coach of the Danish national under-21 football team, to replace an injured Kasper Junker in June 2017. He then got his debut for the U21 national team in a game against Sweden U21.

The winger got his first senior call up on 17 July 2017, where he sat on the bench for the whole game against OB. He was also with the first team squad in Sweden in the summer 2017, where he played a in a friendly match.

Olsen got his debut for FC Nordsjælland on 23 July 2017 at the age of 17. He started on the bench, but replaced Emiliano Marcondes in the 95th minute in a 3–2 victory against Brøndby IF in the Danish Superliga. Few days later, he played 72 minutes in a Danish Cup game against amateur side Vejgaard B, where he both scored and assisted a goal.

On 12 July 2018, Olsen scored his first European goal in a Europa League Qualifier against Cliftonville.

Olsen was officially promoted to the first team squad from the summer 2018. Olsen had a turbulent first half season in the Danish Superliga scoring 11 goals despite his young age. He ended the season scoring 22 league goals.

=== Bologna ===
On 24 July 2019, it was confirmed, that Olsen had left Denmark after two seasons in the Danish Superliga, to join Italian Serie A club Bologna.

=== Club Brugge ===
On 28 January 2022, Bologna announced Olsen's transfer to Club Brugge in Belgium, where he signed a four-and-a-half-year contract. He made his debut on 2 February in a Belgian Cup match against Gent, coming off the bench for Ruud Vormer at half-time and providing the decisive assist for Charles De Ketelaere, securing a 1–0 win for his team. On 17 July 2022, Olsen scored the winning goal for Club in the 2022 Belgian Super Cup against Gent.

=== VfL Wolfsburg ===
On 17 January 2025, Skov Olsen joined Bundesliga side VfL Wolfsburg on a deal until the summer of 2029.

==== Loan to Rangers ====
On 16 January 2026, Skov Olsen signed on loan for Rangers. He was unveiled at Ibrox in a Scottish Cup game against Annan Athletic, alongside new teammates Tochi Chukwuani and Tuur Rommens.

Skov Olsen scored his first goal for Rangers in a 5–1 win over Kilmarnock in the Scottish Premiership.

==== Loan to İstanbul Başakşehir ====
On 28 July 2026, Skov Olsen joined Süper Lig club İstanbul Başakşehir on a one-year loan deal.

== International career ==
Olsen was called up to the senior Denmark squad for the UEFA Nations League matches against Belgium and England in September 2020. He made his debut on 7 October 2020 in a friendly against Faroe Islands and scored a goal in a 4–0 win.

In June 2021, he was included in the national team's bid for 2020 UEFA Euro, where the team reached the semi-finals.

== Career statistics ==
=== Club ===
As of match played 4 May 2026

Appearances and goals by club, season and competition
Club	Season	League			National cup (Note: Includes Danish Cup, Coppa Italia, Belgian Cup, DFB-Pokal, Scottish Cup)		Europe		Other		Total	
Club	Season	Division	Apps	Goals	Apps	Goals	Apps	Goals	Apps	Goals	Apps	Goals
Nordsjælland	2017–18	Danish Superliga	5	0	2	1	–		–		7	1
Nordsjælland	2018–19	Danish Superliga	36	22	2	1	6 (Note: Appearances in UEFA Europa League)	3	–		44	26
Nordsjælland	Total		41	22	4	2	6	3	–		51	27
Bologna	2019–20	Serie A	26	1	0	0	–		–		26	1
Bologna	2020–21	Serie A	26	2	0	0	–		–		26	2
Bologna	2021–22	Serie A	18	0	1	0	–		–		19	0
Bologna	Total		70	3	1	0	–		–		71	3
Club Brugge	2021–22	Belgian Pro League	15	6	2	0	–		–		17	6
Club Brugge	2022–23	Belgian Pro League	23	7	1	0	5 (Note: Appearances in UEFA Champions League)	1	1 (Note: Appearance in Belgian Super Cup)	1	30	9
Club Brugge	2023–24	Belgian Pro League	33	14	5	5	12 (Note: Appearances in UEFA Europa Conference League)	7	–		50	26
Club Brugge	2024–25	Belgian Pro League	19	8	2	0	6	0	0	0	27	8
Club Brugge	Total		90	35	10	5	23	8	1	1	124	49
VfL Wolfsburg	2024–25	Bundesliga	13	1	1	0	–		–		14	1
VfL Wolfsburg	2025–26	Bundesliga	8	1	2	1	–		–		10	2
VfL Wolfsburg	Total		21	2	3	1	–		–		24	3
Rangers (loan)	2025–26	Scottish Premiership	9	1	2	0	—		—		11	1
İstanbul Başakşehir (loan)	2026–27	Süper Lig	4	0	0	0	—		—		0	0
Career total			231	63	20	8	29	11	1	1	281	83

=== International ===
As of match played 14 November 2026

Appearances and goals by national team and year
National team	Year	Apps	Goals
Denmark	2020	2	1
Denmark	2021	13	5
Denmark	2022	10	2
Denmark	2023	4	0
Denmark	2024	8	0
Denmark	2025	3	0
Denmark	2026	2	0
Total		42	8

Scores and results list Denmark's goal tally first, score column indicates score after each Skov Olsen goal.

List of international goals scored by Andreas Skov Olsen
No.	Date	Venue	Cap	Opponent	Score	Result	Competition
1	7 October 2020	MCH Arena, Herning, Denmark	1	Faroe Islands	1–0	4–0	Friendly
2	31 March 2021	Ernst-Happel-Stadion, Vienna, Austria	5	Austria	1–0	4–0	2022 FIFA World Cup qualification
3	31 March 2021	Ernst-Happel-Stadion, Vienna, Austria	5	Austria	4–0	4–0	2022 FIFA World Cup qualification
4	7 September 2021	Parken Stadium, Copenhagen, Denmark	11	Israel	3–0	5–0	2022 FIFA World Cup qualification
5	9 October 2021	Zimbru Stadium, Chișinău, Moldova	12	Moldova	1–0	4–0	2022 FIFA World Cup qualification
6	12 November 2021	Parken Stadium, Copenhagen, Denmark	14	Faroe Islands	1–0	3–1	2022 FIFA World Cup qualification
7	13 June 2022	Parken Stadium, Copenhagen, Denmark	21	Austria	2–0	2–0	2022–23 UEFA Nations League A
8	25 September 2022	Parken Stadium, Copenhagen, Denmark	23	France	2–0	2–0	2022–23 UEFA Nations League A

== Honours ==
Club Brugge

- Belgian Pro League: 2021–22, 2023–24
- Belgian Super Cup: 2022
