= Bjorn Meijer =

Dutch footballer

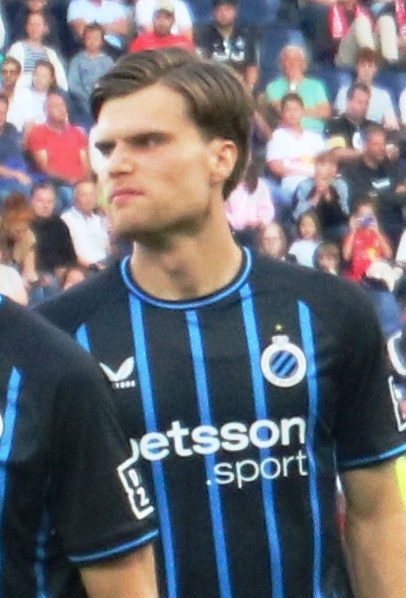
- Meijer with Club Brugge in 2025

Personal information
- Full name: Bjorn Thomas Meijer
- Date of birth: 18 March 2003 (age 23)
- Place of birth: Groningen, Netherlands
- Height: 1.90 m (6 ft 3 in)
- Position: Defender

Team information
- Current team: Sampdoria
- Number: 5

Youth career
- 2012–2021: Groningen

Senior career*
Years	Team	Apps	(Gls)
2021–2022	Groningen	24	(2)
2022–2026	Club Brugge	101	(6)
2026–	Sampdoria	0	(0)

International career^{‡}
2021	Netherlands U-19	2	(0)
2022–2025	Netherlands U-21	13	(2)
- * Club domestic league appearances and goals as of 17 August 2026 ‡ National team caps and goals as of 25 June 2025

Bjorn Thomas Meijer (born 18 March 2003) is a Dutch professional footballer who plays as a defender for Serie B club Sampdoria in Italy.

== Career ==
On 19 April 2022, Meijer signed a four-year contract with Club Brugge in Belgium.

On 12 August 2026, Meijer moved to Italy and joined Sampdoria on a four-season deal.

== Career statistics ==
As of match played 7 August 2026

Appearances and goals by club, season and competition
Club	Season	League			National cup (Note: Includes KNVB Cup, Belgian Cup)		Europe		Other		Total	
Club	Season	Division	Apps	Goals	Apps	Goals	Apps	Goals	Apps	Goals	Apps	Goals
Groningen	2020–21	Eredivisie	1	0	0	0	—		—		1	0
Groningen	2021–22	Eredivisie	23	2	3	0	—		—		26	2
Groningen	Total		24	2	3	0	0	0	0	0	27	2
Club Brugge	2022–23	Belgian Pro League	35	3	2	0	8 (Note: Appearances in UEFA Champions League)	1	0	0	45	4
Club Brugge	2023–24	Belgian Pro League	27	2	5	0	6 (Note: Appearances in UEFA Europa Conference League)	0	0	0	38	2
Club Brugge	2024–25	Belgian Pro League	11	0	2	0	2	0	0	0	15	0
Club Brugge	2025–26	Belgian Pro League	26	1	1	0	10	0	1 (Note: Appearance in Belgian Super Cup)	0	38	1
Club Brugge	2026–27	Belgian Pro League	1	0	0	0	0	0	0	0	1	0
Club Brugge	Total		100	6	10	0	26	1	1	0	137	7
Club NXT	2023–24	Challenger Pro League	1	0	—		—		—		1	0
Career total			125	8	13	0	26	1	1	0	163	9

== Honours ==
Club Brugge

- Belgian Pro League: 2023–24
- Belgian Cup: 2024–25
- Belgian Super Cup: 2022

Individual

- Eredivisie Team of the Month: February 2022
