= Owen Otasowie =

American soccer player (born 2001)

Personal information
- Full name: Ebeguowen Otasowie
- Date of birth: January 6, 2001 (age 25)
- Place of birth: New York City, United States
- Height: 6 ft 2 in (1.88 m)
- Position: Defensive midfielder

Youth career
- 2015–2017: Mass Elite Academy
- 2017–2019: Wolverhampton Wanderers

Senior career*
Years	Team	Apps	(Gls)
2019–2021	Wolverhampton Wanderers	6	(0)
2021–2022	Club Brugge	1	(0)
2022	→ Club NXT	4	(0)

International career
2018	United States U18	3	(0)
2020	United States	1	(0)
- * Club domestic league appearances and goals

Ebeguowen "Owen" Otasowie (born January 6, 2001) is an American former professional soccer player who played as a defensive midfielder.

== Early life ==
Otasowie was born in New York City to Nigerian parents, and moved to Peckham at a young age to live with his aunt and cousins. He didn't take up soccer until his early teens when he started playing with his friends, and quickly realized he was quite good.

== Club career ==
At the age of 14, Otasowie joined the Mass Elite Academy, based in Battersea, which recruits youngsters from local Saturday and Sunday teams. The academy was established in 2013 to provide a developmental pathway for young, unsigned players, helping them secure professional club contracts. The academy would arrange friendlies against youth academies of professional clubs. He went on trial with Birmingham City and Ipswich Town, even training with West Ham United.

He was spotted by staff from Wolverhampton Wanderers in a friendly against Wolves' academy at the under-16 level and was offered a scholarship to join them in 2016.

=== Wolverhampton Wanderers ===
Otasowie immediately impressed at the academy. In early 2018, it was rumoured he had interest from numerous clubs across Europe including Everton, Juventus, Ajax, and Schalke 04 but continued with Wolves. Otasowie had a serious knee injury while with the academy which required multiple operations, eventually recovering in 2019 and playing for the U-23 side.

After progressing from the youth academy, Otasowie made his senior debut for the side as a substitute in Wolves' final UEFA Europa League group match of the 2019–20 edition against Beşiktaş on December 12, 2019. On January 1, 2020, Otasowie signed a new two-and-a-half-year contract with Wolves.

On December 15, 2020, Otasowie made his Premier League debut for Wolves as a substitute on for Leander Dendoncker in a 2–1 home win over Chelsea, providing an assist for Daniel Podence. Otasowie had his first Premier League start in their following game, away at Burnley, on December 21, 2020.

=== Club Brugge ===
On August 20, 2021, Otasowie made a permanent move to Club Brugge of the Belgian First Division A for a reported fee of £3.5 million. Otasowie made his debut for Club on July 17, 2022, during their 2022 Belgian Super Cup victory over Gent.

In November 2022, Belgian newspaper Het Nieuwsblad reported Otasowie had stopped being paid by Club Brugge after going absent without leave a number of times.

== International career ==
Otasowie is eligible to represent the United States, England or Nigeria.

After representing the United States at the under-18 level, Otasowie received his first call up to the senior United States squad for matches against Wales and Panama in November 2020. He made his senior debut on November 12, 2020, coming on in the 87th minute of a 0–0 draw against Wales in Swansea.

== Personal life ==
He is a Burberry model. In 2021, Otasowie founded fashion brand Carsicko.

== Career statistics ==
=== Club ===
As of match played September 17, 2022

Appearances and goals by club, season and competition
Club	Season	League			National cup (Note: Includes FA Cup and Belgian Cup)		League cup (Note: Includes EFL Cup)		Europe		Other		Total	
Club	Season	Division	Apps	Goals	Apps	Goals	Apps	Goals	Apps	Goals	Apps	Goals	Apps	Goals
Wolverhampton Wanderers	2019–20	Premier League	0	0	0	0	0	0	1 (Note: Appearance in UEFA Europa League)	0	—		1	0
Wolverhampton Wanderers	2020–21	Premier League	6	0	0	0	0	0	—		—		6	0
Wolverhampton Wanderers	Total		6	0	0	0	0	0	1	0	0	0	7	0
Wolverhampton Wanderers U21s	2019–20 EFL Trophy		—		—		—		—		3 (Note: Appearances in EFL Trophy)	0	3	0
Wolverhampton Wanderers U21s	2020–21 EFL Trophy		—		—		—		—		2	0	2	0
Wolverhampton Wanderers U21s	Total		—		—		—		—		5	0	5	0
Club Brugge	2021–22	Belgian Pro League	0	0	0	0	—		0	0	—		0	0
Club Brugge	2022–23	Belgian Pro League	1	0	0	0	—		0	0	1 (Note: Appearance in Belgian Super Cup)	0	2	0
Club Brugge	Total		1	0	0	0	—		0	0	1	0	2	0
Club NXT	2022–23	Challenger Pro League	4	0	—		—		—		—		4	0
Career total			11	0	0	0	0	0	1	0	6	0	18	0

=== International ===
As of match played November 12, 2020

Appearances and goals by national team and year
National team	Year	Apps	Goals
United States	2020	1	0
Total		1	0

== Honors ==
Club Brugge

- Belgian Super Cup: 2022
