= Simon Mignolet =

Belgian footballer (born 1988)

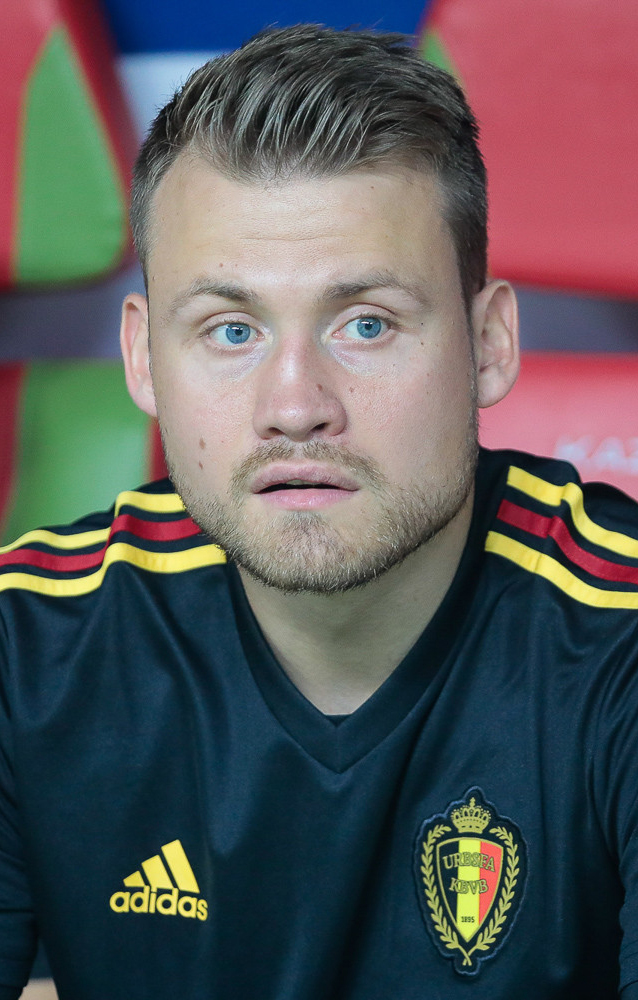
- Mignolet with Belgium at the 2018 FIFA World Cup

Personal information
- Full name: Simon Luc Hildebert Mignolet
- Date of birth: 6 March 1988 (age 38)
- Place of birth: Sint-Truiden, Belgium
- Height: 1.93 m (6 ft 4 in)
- Position: Goalkeeper

Youth career
- 2004–2006: Sint-Truiden

Senior career*
Years	Team	Apps	(Gls)
2006–2010	Sint-Truiden	100	(1)
2010–2013	Sunderland	90	(0)
2013–2019	Liverpool	155	(0)
2019–2026	Club Brugge	223	(0)
Total		568	(1)

International career
2003	Belgium U16	1	(0)
2004	Belgium U17	2	(0)
2005–2006	Belgium U18	11	(0)
2006–2007	Belgium U19	3	(0)
2009	Belgium U20	1	(0)
2008–2010	Belgium U21	10	(0)
2011–2022	Belgium	35	(0)
Medal record
Men's football
Representing Belgium
FIFA World Cup
Third place	2018 Russia
- * Club domestic league appearances and goals

Simon Luc Hildebert Mignolet (born 6 March 1988) is a Belgian former professional footballer who played as a goalkeeper.

Mignolet started his career with Belgian Second Division side Sint-Truiden in 2004, and spent six years with the club, making 100 senior league appearances and scoring a goal. He moved to Premier League side Sunderland in June 2010 for £2 million, spending three years with them and making 101 appearances across all competitions. Following a move to Liverpool in June 2013 for £9 million, Mignolet made over 200 appearances and stayed for six years at the club. After spending seven seasons back in Belgium with Club Brugge, he retired from professional football in 2026.

Mignolet represented the Belgium national team at every level from under-16 upwards. He made his senior debut in 2011, and went on to earn over 30 caps. He was also named to Belgium's squad for the 2014, 2018 and 2022 FIFA World Cup, and UEFA Euro 2016 and 2020.

== Club career ==
=== Sint-Truiden ===
Mignolet was born in Sint-Truiden. He first joined his local football team, Belgian Second Division side Sint-Truiden, in 2004, eventually rising through their youth system to become their first-choice goalkeeper in 2006 at age 18 after the departure of Dušan Belić. In 2009, he made 29 appearances and scored a rebound after his penalty was saved during a 5–1 away win in the league against K.S.K. Ronse, as he helped Sint-Truiden to win the Belgian Second Division, and was named Belgian Goalkeeper of the Year the following year after he helped Sint-Truiden avoid relegation.

=== Sunderland ===
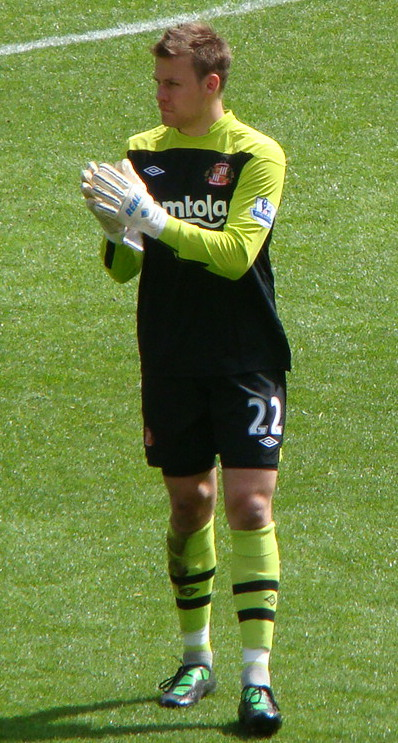
Mignolet with Sunderland in 2011

After being invited for a training ground tour, Mignolet signed a five-year contract with English Premier League club Sunderland on 17 June 2010 in a deal worth £2 million. It was later confirmed by Sint-Truiden that Sunderland had beaten PSV, Twente and Udinese to secure Mignolet's signature.

Mignolet made his Sunderland debut in a 2–2 draw against Birmingham City on 15 August 2010, and was named man of the match for his performance. In the next home match, a 1–0 victory against Manchester City, Mignolet kept his first clean sheet for Sunderland, following an excellent reaction save to deny Emmanuel Adebayor a goal. Mignolet put in another fine performance against Arsenal, as Sunderland drew 1–1 after Darren Bent equalised in the 95th minute. However, Craig Gordon would replace Mignolet in goal several weeks later, and remained first-choice thereafter. Mignolet did not feature again until 8 January 2011, when Sunderland suffered a loss at home to Notts County in the third round of the FA Cup. Mignolet would become first-choice goalkeeper again after a knee injury to Gordon in February, and earned a string of rave reviews for his performances. Following the draw, Sunderland manager Steve Bruce hailed the young goalkeeper's fine start to life in English football. Mignolet cemented his position as first-choice goalkeeper the following season, being preferred to new signing Keiren Westwood.

On 29 October 2011, Mignolet was injured during a 2–2 draw with Aston Villa, suffering a broken nose following a collision with Emile Heskey. Mignolet played every single match of the following season, keeping a large number of clean sheets and producing several man of the match performances. His form prompted Manchester City and England goalkeeper Joe Hart to praise Mignolet in December 2012 as being the best goalkeeper in the league so far that season. On 21 June 2013, it was reported Liverpool had agreed a deal to sign the player for around £9 million.

=== Liverpool ===
==== 2013–14 season ====
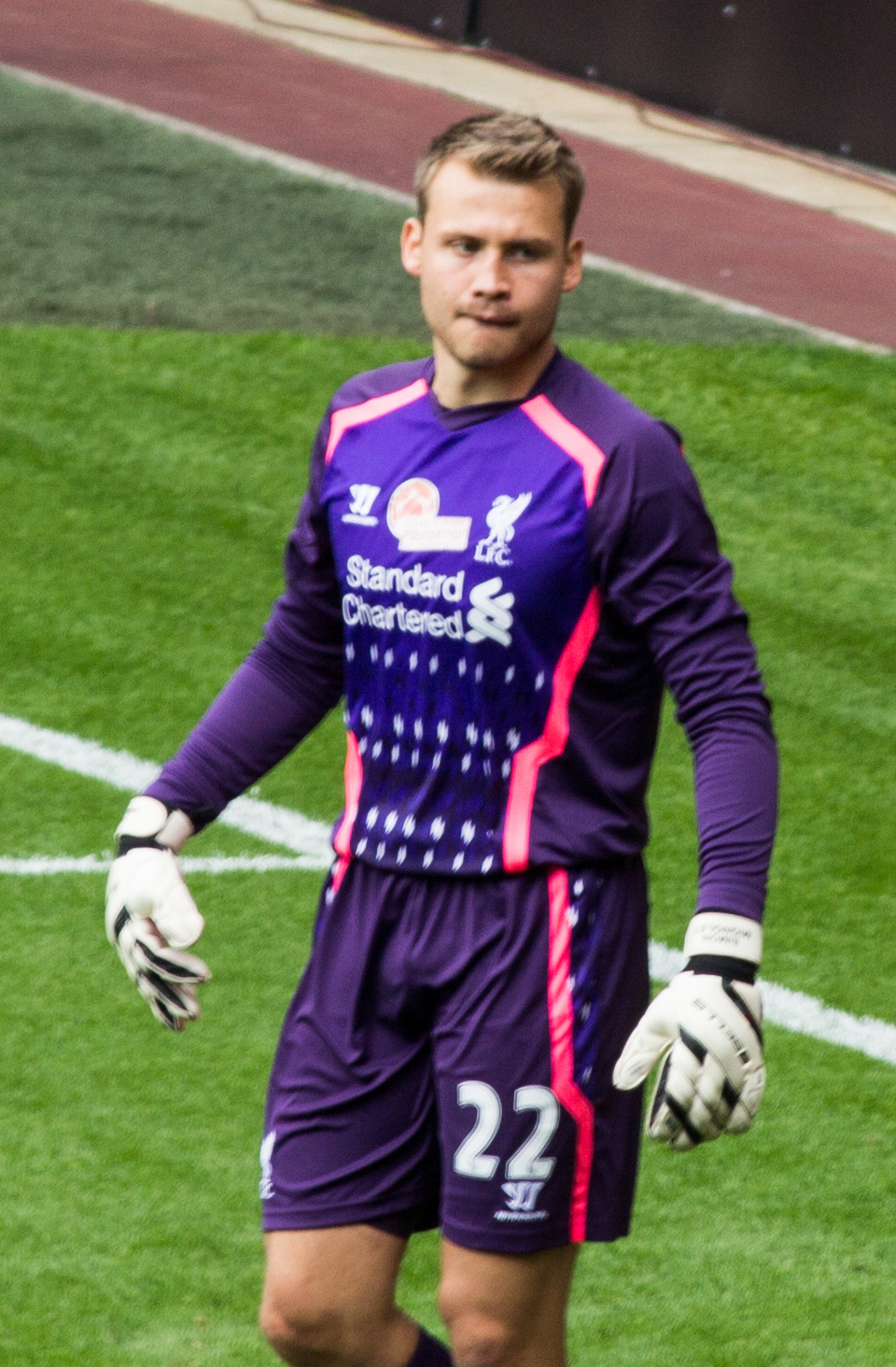
Mignolet with Liverpool in 2013 during Steven Gerrard's testimonial match

On 25 June 2013, Mignolet signed with Liverpool for a reported fee of £9 million on a five-year contract. Liverpool manager Brendan Rodgers hailed Mignolet as being "one of the top goalkeepers in the Premier League". On 13 July 2013, he made his unofficial debut for Liverpool in a 4–0 win in a pre-season friendly over Preston North End. On 17 August 2013, Mignolet made his official debut in the 1–0 home win against Stoke City at Anfield. In the 89th minute of the match, he saved a Jonathan Walters penalty, as well as Kenwyne Jones' follow-up shot, to preserve Liverpool's lead and effectively win the match. He then recorded two more clean sheets against Aston Villa and Manchester United, with both matches ending 1–0 in favour of Liverpool. Two weeks later, he conceded his first goals for Liverpool in the Premier League in a 2–2 draw with Swansea City, though he was still named man of the match for the fixture. Mignolet was also named man of the match in the 3–3 draw with Everton, making nine saves throughout the match.

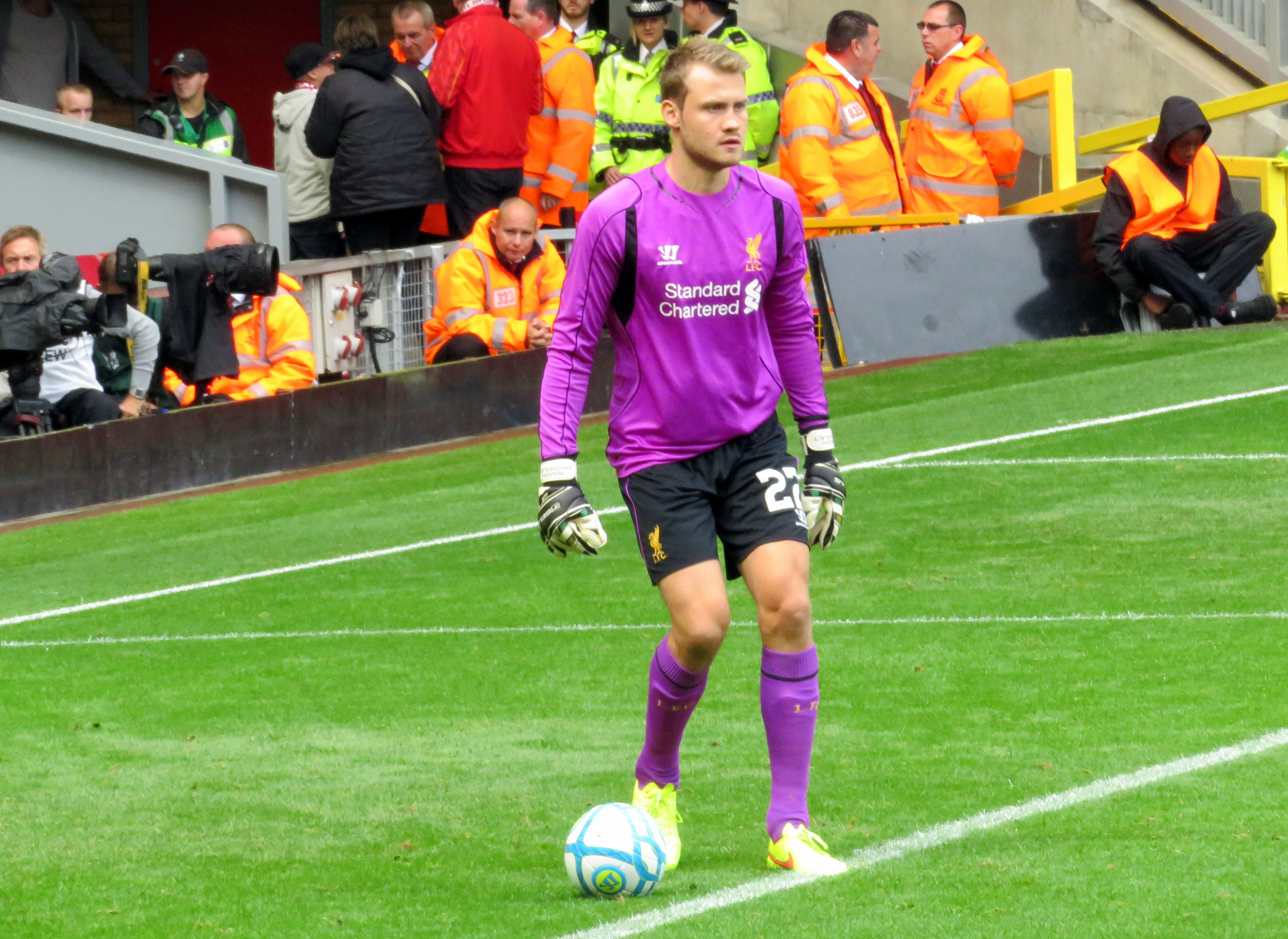
Mignolet playing for Liverpool in 2014

==== 2014–15 season ====
On 14 December 2014, Mignolet's run of 53 consecutive Premier League starts came to an end as he was replaced by Brad Jones in the starting 11 against Manchester United, with Brendan Rodgers saying Mignolet would be dropped for an "indefinite period". However, 12 days later, Jones went off injured after 16 minutes away at Burnley, and despite some errors, Mignolet kept a clean sheet in a 1–0 victory. After this match, Mignolet kept four consecutive clean sheets against Sunderland, Aston Villa, West Ham United and Everton respectively. On 10 February, Mignolet made some outstanding saves against Tottenham Hotspur in a 3–2 win. On 16 March, Mignolet continued his resurgence in a 1–0 victory against Swansea City, keeping a clean sheet as part of a strong performance. On 22 March, he saved a penalty taken by Wayne Rooney in a 2–1 defeat against Manchester United.

==== 2015–2019 ====
On 18 January 2016, Mignolet signed a new five-year deal with the club. Eight days later, he saved a penalty from Stoke City's Peter Crouch and Marc Muniesa in a penalty shoot-out to send Liverpool to the 2016 Football League Cup final at Wembley Stadium.

Although he started the first five matches of the season, Liverpool manager Jürgen Klopp dropped Mignolet in favour of new signing Loris Karius on 24 September 2016 for the match against Hull City. On 24 October 2016, Klopp confirmed Mignolet was no longer Liverpool's first-choice goalkeeper and that he would be given cup matches instead. However, Mignolet returned to the starting lineup for the team in Premier League in December 2016.

On 23 September 2017, Mignolet saved his club-record 8th penalty taken by Jamie Vardy, preserving a 3–2 victory over Leicester City.On 4 November, Mignolet captained Liverpool for the first time in a 4–1 win against West Ham United. On 26 December, Mignolet and teammate Philippe Coutinho both made their 200th appearances for Liverpool in a 5–0 Premier League win over Swansea City.

Liverpool signed Alisson Becker as their first choice goalkeeper which led to Mignolet playing domestic cup games only. He started the 2–1 defeat to Chelsea in the EFL Cup on 26 September 2018. Mignolet also started in the 2–1 defeat to Wolverhampton Wanderers in the FA Cup on 7 January 2019. Mignolet was an unused substitute in the 2019 UEFA Champions League final, which Liverpool won 2–0.

=== Club Brugge ===
On 4 August 2019, following the 2019 FA Community Shield, Mignolet signed a five-year contract with Belgian side Club Brugge, for a reported fee of £6.4 million.

On 2 April 2026, Club Brugge announced that Mignolet would be retiring from professional play at the end of the 2025–26 season. On 24 May 2026, after the 2025–26 Belgian Pro League Champions' play-offs final match against Gent, he retired.

== International career ==
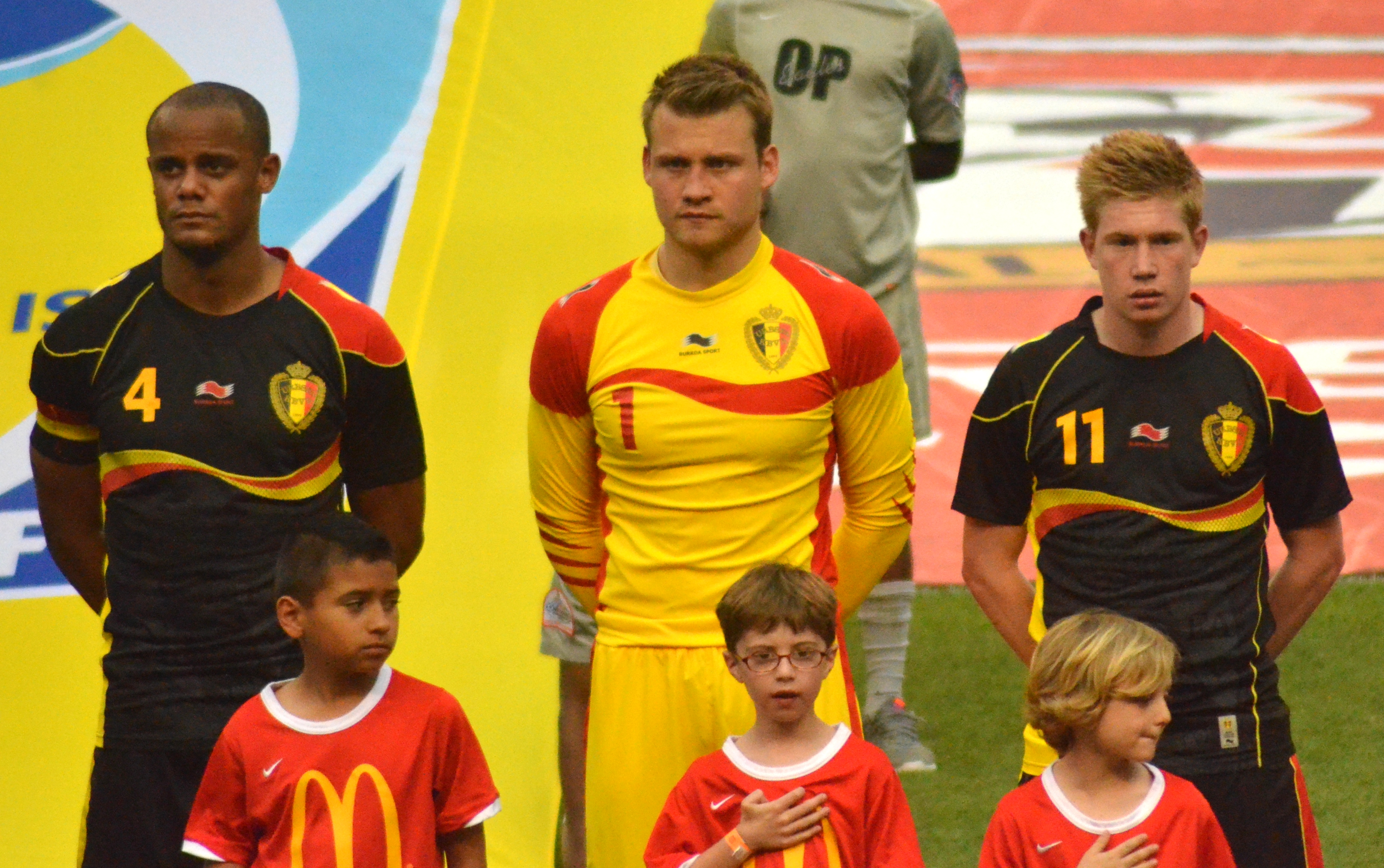
Mignolet (middle) with Belgian teammates Vincent Kompany (left) and Kevin De Bruyne in 2013

Mignolet first represented the Belgian under-21 side in 2008, and went on to make ten appearances for the side. On 1 September 2010, he won his first call up to the Belgian senior squad after a good run of form for Sunderland. He made his full international debut in a 2–0 victory over Austria on 25 March 2011 in a UEFA Euro 2012 qualifying match. He remained in the starting line-up for each of the four remaining qualifying matches, in addition to playing in three friendly matches during the qualifying campaign. However, he was unable to help Belgium qualify for the Euro 2012 finals, as a 3–1 defeat against Germany saw them finish third in their qualifying group.

Mignolet played in two further friendly internationals during the 2011–12 season, starting against Greece and England. However, following the match against England, he did not play an international match for four months, with Thibaut Courtois being preferred instead. He returned to the starting lineup on 14 November 2012 in a 1–2 friendly loss over Romania. His next international match came over six months later in a 4–2 friendly victory over the United States on 29 May 2013.

Mignolet served as back-up goalkeeper during the 2014 FIFA World Cup qualification campaign, with Courtois playing every minute as Belgium qualified for its first major tournament since the 2002 World Cup.

On 10 October 2015, Mignolet started for an injured Courtois in Belgium's last two Euro 2016 qualifying matches: a 4–1 win over Andorra and a 3–1 victory over Israel, helping seal Belgium's qualification for the first time since co-hosting Euro 2000.

In May 2018, Mignolet was named in Belgium's preliminary squad for the 2018 World Cup in Russia, and later appeared on their final 23-man squad as a goalkeeper together with Thibaut Courtois and Koen Casteels. He would go on to be named in the final squads for UEFA Euro 2020 and the 2022 World Cup, but again did not make an appearance at either tournament.

On 14 March 2023, Mignolet officially announced his retirement from international football at the age of 35.

== Personal life ==
Mignolet can speak Dutch, English, French and German. He has a degree in political science from the Catholic University of Leuven. On 20 June 2015, Mignolet married his girlfriend Jasmien Claes in his hometown. Their son, Lex, was born in October 2019. Their second son, Vin, was born in March 2022.

== Career statistics ==
=== Club ===
Appearances and goals by club, season and competition
Club	Season	League			National cup (Note: Includes Belgian Cup, FA Cup)		League cup (Note: Includes Football League/EFL Cup)		Europe		Other		Total	
Club	Season	Division	Apps	Goals	Apps	Goals	Apps	Goals	Apps	Goals	Apps	Goals	Apps	Goals
Sint-Truiden	2005–06	Belgian Pro League	0	0	0	0	—		—		—		0	0
Sint-Truiden	2006–07	Belgian Pro League	2	0	0	0	—		—		—		2	0
Sint-Truiden	2007–08	Belgian Pro League	25	0	1	0	—		—		—		26	0
Sint-Truiden	2008–09	Belgian Second Division	35	1	1	0	—		—		—		36	1
Sint-Truiden	2009–10	Belgian Pro League	39	0	1	0	—		—		—		40	0
Sint-Truiden	Total		100	1	4	0	—		—		—		104	1
Sunderland	2010–11	Premier League	23	0	1	0	2	0	—		—		26	0
Sunderland	2011–12	Premier League	29	0	6	0	0	0	—		—		35	0
Sunderland	2012–13	Premier League	38	0	2	0	0	0	—		—		40	0
Sunderland	Total		90	0	9	0	2	0	—		—		101	0
Liverpool	2013–14	Premier League	38	0	0	0	2	0	—		—		40	0
Liverpool	2014–15	Premier League	36	0	7	0	3	0	8 (Note: Six appearances in UEFA Champions League, two appearances in UEFA Europa League)	0	—		54	0
Liverpool	2015–16	Premier League	34	0	3	0	3	0	15 (Note: Appearances in UEFA Europa League)	0	—		55	0
Liverpool	2016–17	Premier League	28	0	0	0	3	0	—		—		31	0
Liverpool	2017–18	Premier League	19	0	1	0	0	0	2 (Note: Appearances in UEFA Champions League)	0	—		22	0
Liverpool	2018–19	Premier League	0	0	1	0	1	0	0	0	—		2	0
Liverpool	Total		155	0	12	0	12	0	25	0	—		204	0
Club Brugge	2019–20	Belgian Pro League	27	0	5	0	—		12 (Note: Ten appearances in UEFA Champions League, two appearances in UEFA Europa League)	0	—		44	0
Club Brugge	2020–21	Belgian Pro League	38	0	2	0	—		7 (Note: Five appearances in UEFA Champions League, two appearances in UEFA Europa League)	0	—		47	0
Club Brugge	2021–22	Belgian Pro League	39	0	4	0	—		6	0	0	0	49	0
Club Brugge	2022–23	Belgian Pro League	40	0	2	0	—		8	0	1 (Note: Appearance in Belgian Super Cup)	0	51	0
Club Brugge	2023–24	Belgian Pro League	32	0	5	0	—		14 (Note: Appearances in UEFA Europa Conference League)	0	—		51	0
Club Brugge	2024–25	Belgian Pro League	35	0	0	0	—		12	0	1	0	48	0
Club Brugge	2025–26	Belgian Pro League	12	0	0	0	—		8	0	1	0	21	0
Club Brugge	Total		223	0	18	0	—		67	0	3	0	311	0
Career total			568	1	43	0	14	0	92	0	3	0	720	1

=== International ===
Appearances and goals by national team and year
National team	Year	Apps	Goals
Belgium	2011	8	0
Belgium	2012	3	0
Belgium	2013	3	0
Belgium	2014	0	0
Belgium	2015	3	0
Belgium	2016	1	0
Belgium	2017	2	0
Belgium	2018	2	0
Belgium	2019	1	0
Belgium	2020	6	0
Belgium	2021	2	0
Belgium	2022	4	0
Total		35	0

== Honours ==
Sint-Truiden

- Belgian Second Division: 2008–09

Liverpool

- UEFA Champions League: 2018–19; runner-up: 2017–18
- Football League Cup runner-up: 2015–16
- UEFA Europa League runner-up: 2015–16

Club Brugge

- Belgian Pro League: 2019–20, 2020–21, 2021–22, 2023–24, 2025–26
- Belgian Cup: 2024–25; runner-up: 2019–20
- Belgian Super Cup: 2022, 2025

Belgium

- FIFA World Cup third place: 2018

Individual

- Belgian Goalkeeper of the Year: 2009–10, 2020–21, 2021–22
- Sint-Truiden Player of the Year: 2008–09, 2009–10
- North-East FWA Player of the Year: 2012
- Sunderland Player of the Year: 2012–13
- MOTD Keeper of the Year: 2013
- Belgian First Division A Goalkeeper of the Year: 2019, 2020, 2021, 2022, 2024
- Club Brugge Player of the Year: 2022
- Belgian Golden Shoe: 2022
- Honorary Citizen of Sint-Truiden, Belgium: 2024
