= Kamal Sowah =

Ghanaian footballer

Personal information
- Full name: Kamal Sowah
- Date of birth: 9 January 2000 (age 26)
- Place of birth: Sabon Zango, Ghana
- Height: 1.79 m (5 ft 10 in)
- Position: Forward

Team information
- Current team: NAC Breda
- Number: 55

Youth career
- –2018: Right to Dream Academy

Senior career*
Years	Team	Apps	(Gls)
2018–2021	Leicester City	0	(0)
2018–2021	→ OH Leuven (loan)	67	(11)
2021–2025	Club Brugge	36	(0)
2022	→ AZ (loan)	8	(0)
2023–2024	→ Standard Liège (loan)	27	(2)
2025–	NAC Breda	45	(1)

International career^{‡}
2022–	Ghana	1	(0)
- * Club domestic league appearances and goals as of 21 May 2026 ‡ National team caps and goals as of 18 November 2022

Kamal Sowah (born 9 January 2000) is a Ghanaian professional footballer who plays as a forward for Dutch Eerste Divisie club NAC Breda and the Ghana national team.

== Club career ==
=== Leicester City ===
Following a successful trail, Sowah signed his first successful professional contract with Leicester City on 31 January 2018, keeping him at the club until mid-2022. Later that same day Sowah was loaned to Oud-Heverlee Leuven, a club also owned by King Power, for one and a half seasons to gain more experience. Sowah played his first match on 14 April 2018, coming on as a substitute for Joeri Dequevy in a 2–0 win at Waasland-Beveren. On 23 August 2019, Sowah scored his first two professional goals in a 6–0 victory against RFC Wetteren in the Belgian Cup.

=== Club Brugge ===
On 27 August 2021, Sowah joined Club Brugge for an undisclosed fee.

==== AZ Alkmaar (loan) ====
On 31 January 2022, Sowah was loaned to AZ Alkmaar in Dutch Eredivisie until the end of the season.

==== Return to Club Brugge ====
In the 2022–23 season Sowah returned to Club Brugge. On 13 September 2022, he scored his first goal for the club, in a 4–0 away win at FC Porto in the UEFA Champions League. On 4 October, Sowah scored again in the competition, in a 2–0 home win over Atlético Madrid.

==== Standard Liège (loan) ====
On 6 September 2023, Club Brugge sent Sowah on a season-long loan with an option-to-buy to fellow Belgian Pro League side Standard Liège.

==== Release by Club Brugge ====
On 16 January 2025, the contract with Club Brugge was terminated by mutual consent, Sowah did not appear for the club in the 2024–25 season.

=== NAC Breda ===
On 3 February 2025, Sowah signed with NAC Breda in the Netherlands for two and a half seasons.

== Career statistics ==
As of match played 7 March 2023

Appearances and goals by club, season and competition
Club	Season	League			National cup		League cup		Continental		Other		Total	
Club	Season	Division	Apps	Goals	Apps	Goals	Apps	Goals	Apps	Goals	Apps	Goals	Apps	Goals
Leicester City	2017–18	Premier League	0	0	0	0	0	0	—		—		0	0
OH Leuven (loan)	2017–18	Belgian First Division B	4	0	0	0	—		—		—		4	0
OH Leuven (loan)	2018–19	Belgian First Division B	2	0	1	0	—		—		—		3	0
OH Leuven (loan)	2019–20	Belgian First Division B	27	3	2	2	—		—		—		29	5
OH Leuven (loan)	2020–21	Belgian First Division A	34	8	2	0	—		—		—		36	8
OH Leuven (loan)	Total		67	11	5	2	—		—		—		72	13
Club Brugge	2021–22	Belgian First Division A	9	0	3	0	—		5 (Note: Appearance(s) in UEFA Champions League)	0	0	0	17	0
Club Brugge	2022–23	Belgian Pro League	27	0	1	0	—		7	2	1 (Note: Appearance in Belgian Super Cup)	0	36	2
Club Brugge	Total		36	0	4	0	—		12	2	1	0	53	2
AZ Alkmaar (loan)	2021–22	Eredivisie	8	0	1	0	—		2 (Note: Appearance(s) in UEFA Europa Conference League)	0			11	0
Standard Liège (loan)	2023–24	Belgian Pro League	0	0	0	0	—		—		—		0	0
Career total			111	11	10	2	0	0	14	2	1	0	136	15

== Honours ==
Club Brugge

- Belgian Pro League: 2021–22
- Belgian Super Cup: 2022
