= Antonio Nusa =

Norwegian footballer (born 2005)

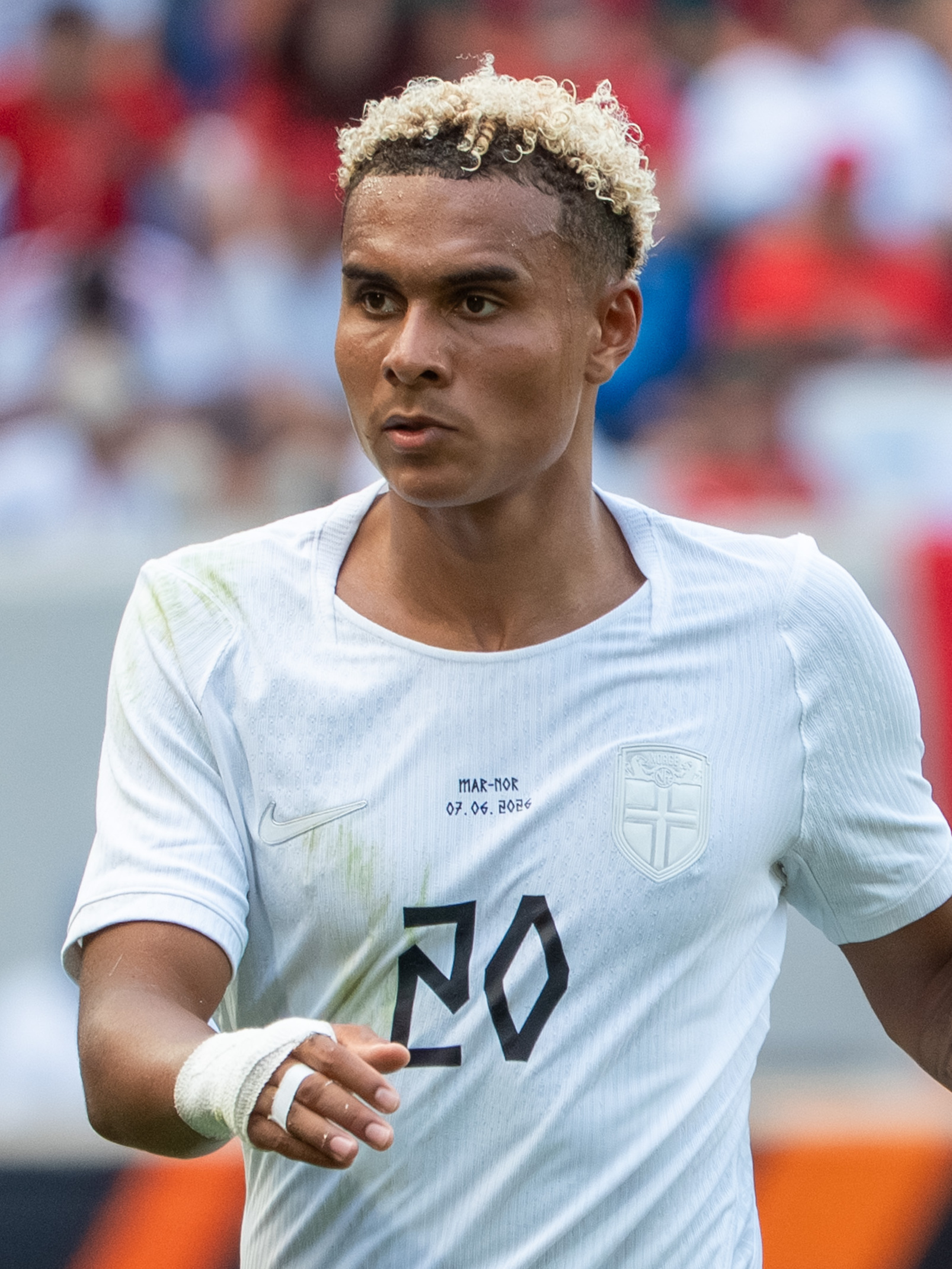
- Nusa with Norway in 2026

Personal information
- Full name: Antonio Eromonsele Nordby Nusa
- Date of birth: 17 April 2005 (age 21)
- Place of birth: Langhus, Norway
- Height: 1.83 m (6 ft 0 in)
- Positions: Winger; attacking midfielder

Team information
- Current team: RB Leipzig
- Number: 7

Youth career
- 2015–2017: Langhus
- 2018–2021: Stabæk

Senior career*
Years	Team	Apps	(Gls)
2020–2021	Stabæk	11	(3)
2021–2024	Club Brugge	62	(5)
2022–2023	Club NXT	2	(4)
2024–	RB Leipzig	64	(11)

International career^{‡}
2021	Norway U16	2	(1)
2022	Norway U18	6	(2)
2022–2023	Norway U19	5	(3)
2023	Norway U21	3	(0)
2023–	Norway	36	(10)
- * Club domestic league appearances and goals as of 17:30, 31 October 2026 (UTC) ‡ National team caps and goals as of 21:50, 17 November 2026 (UTC)

Antonio Eromonsele Nordby Nusa (born 17 April 2005) is a Norwegian professional footballer who plays as a winger or attacking midfielder for Bundesliga club RB Leipzig and the Norway national team.

== Club career ==
Starting his career at Langhus, he moved to Stabæk's youth section at the age of 13. He signed his first professional contract with Stabæk in May 2020.

He was given the chance to train with the senior team in early 2021, and subsequently given a new three-year contract in May of that year. On 30 May 2021, he made his Eliteserien debut against Rosenborg. On 27 June 2021, he scored his first goal for the club in a 4–1 defeat against Bodø/Glimt. He made his full debut three days later, scoring two goals against Viking FK.

During the last transfer day of summer 2021, he signed a contract with Club Brugge. On 13 September 2022, he scored a goal on his Champions League debut in a 4–0 away win against Porto, becoming the youngest Norwegian player to feature, and the second youngest player of any nationality to score in the competition.

On 13 August 2024, Nusa signed a five-year contract with RB Leipzig in Germany. Later that month, on 24 August, he scored a goal on his Bundesliga debut in a 1–0 victory over VfL Bochum.

== International career ==
Nusa with Norway in 2026

Nusa was called up by the Norway U19s for the elite qualifying round for the 2023 UEFA European Under-19 Championship, and scored the winner in a 2–1 win over France in Orléans.

In August 2023, Nusa received his first call-up to the Norway senior national team by head coach Ståle Solbakken, for a friendly match against Jordan and a UEFA Euro 2024 qualifying match against Georgia. He scored his first international goal for Norway in his debut match against Jordan, which they won by 6–0.

On 21 May 2026, Nusa was included in the 26-man squad selected by Norway national team manager Ståle Solbakken for the 2026 FIFA World Cup.

== Style of play ==
Unlike many wingers who struggle when switched flanks, Nusa is equally effective on both wings. Renowned for his explosive pace and direct playing style, he offers a significant threat on the counter-attack. His technical ability and skilful nature have earned him the nickname "Norwegian Neymar."

== Personal life ==
Nusa was born in Norway to a Norwegian mother and a Nigerian father.

== Career statistics ==
=== Club ===
As of match played 4 November 2026

Appearances and goals by club, season and competition
Club	Season	League			National cup (Note: Includes Norwegian Cup, Belgian Cup, DFB-Pokal)		Europe		Other		Total	
Club	Season	Division	Apps	Goals	Apps	Goals	Apps	Goals	Apps	Goals	Apps	Goals
Stabæk	2021	Eliteserien	11	3	2	0	—		—		13	3
Club Brugge	2021–22	Belgian Pro League	3	1	1	0	0	0	—		4	1
Club Brugge	2022–23	Belgian Pro League	26	1	1	0	4 (Note: Appearances in UEFA Champions League)	1	1 (Note: Appearance in Belgian Super Cup)	0	32	2
Club Brugge	2023–24	Belgian Pro League	30	3	3	0	13 (Note: Appearances in UEFA Europa Conference League)	1	—		46	4
Club Brugge	2024–25	Belgian Pro League	3	0	—		—		1	0	4	0
Club Brugge	Total		62	5	5	0	17	2	2	0	86	7
Club NXT	2022–23	Challenger Pro League	2	0	—		—		—		2	0
RB Leipzig	2024–25	Bundesliga	25	3	3	2	8	0	—		36	5
RB Leipzig	2025–26	Bundesliga	31	4	4	1	—		—		35	5
RB Leipzig	2026–27	Bundesliga	8	4	2	1	4	1	—		14	6
RB Leipzig	Total		64	11	9	4	12	1	—		85	16
Career total			139	19	16	4	29	3	2	0	186	26

=== International ===
As of match played 17 November 2026

Appearances and goals by national team and year
National team	Year	Apps	Goals
Norway	2023	4	1
Norway	2024	9	3
Norway	2025	7	3
Norway	2026	16	3
Total		36	10

Scores and results list Norway's goal tally first, score column indicates score after each Nusa goal.

List of international goals scored by Antonio Nusa
No.	Date	Venue	Cap	Opponent	Score	Result	Competition
1	7 September 2023	Ullevaal Stadion, Oslo, Norway	1	Jordan	1–0	6–0	Friendly
2	14 November 2024	Stožice Stadium, Ljubljana, Slovenia	12	Slovenia	1–0	4–1	2024–25 UEFA Nations League B
3	14 November 2024	Stožice Stadium, Ljubljana, Slovenia	12	Slovenia	3–1	4–1	2024–25 UEFA Nations League B
4	17 November 2024	Ullevaal Stadion, Oslo, Norway	13	Kazakhstan	5–0	5–0	2024–25 UEFA Nations League B
5	6 June 2025	Ullevaal Stadion, Oslo, Norway	14	Italy	2–0	3–0	2026 FIFA World Cup qualification
6	14 October 2025	Ullevaal Stadion, Oslo, Norway	18	New Zealand	1–1	1–1	Friendly
7	16 November 2025	San Siro, Milan, Italy	20	Italy	1–1	4–1	2026 FIFA World Cup qualification
8	1 June 2026	Ullevaal Stadion, Oslo, Norway	23	Sweden	2–0	3–1	Friendly
9	30 June 2026	AT&T Stadium, Arlington, United States	28	Ivory Coast	1–0	2–1	2026 FIFA World Cup
10	14 November 2026	Ullevaal Stadion, Oslo, Norway	35	Wales	1–0	3–1	2026–27 UEFA Nations League

== Honours ==
Club Brugge

- Belgian Pro League: 2021–22, 2023–24
- Belgian Super Cup: 2022
