= Ferran Jutglà =

Spanish footballer (born 1999)

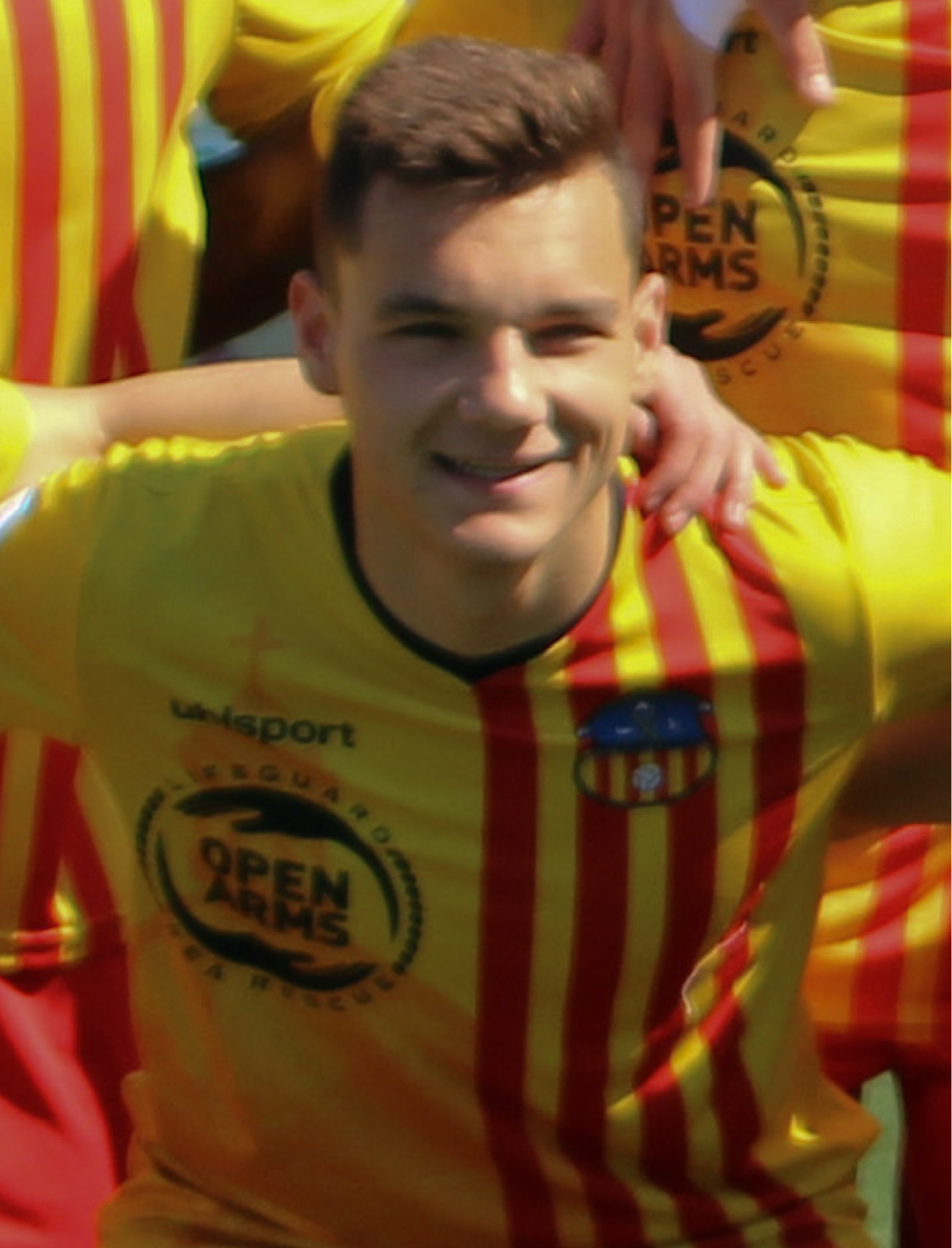
- Jutglà lining up for Sant Andreu in 2019

Personal information
- Full name: Ferran Jutglà Blanch
- Date of birth: 1 February 1999 (age 27)
- Place of birth: Sant Julià de Vilatorta, Spain
- Height: 1.75 m (5 ft 9 in)
- Position: Forward

Team information
- Current team: Celta
- Number: 9

Youth career
- Sant Julià de Vilatorta
- Vic Riuprimer
- 2012–2015: Espanyol
- 2015–2016: Vic Riuprimer
- 2016–2017: Unificación Bellvitge
- 2017: Sant Julià de Vilatorta
- 2017–2018: Sant Andreu
- 2018: Valencia

Senior career*
Years	Team	Apps	(Gls)
2017	Sant Julià de Vilatorta	6	(0)
2017–2018	Sant Andreu	8	(1)
2018–2021	Espanyol B	52	(12)
2018–2019	→ Sant Andreu (loan)	39	(7)
2021–2022	Barcelona B	32	(19)
2021–2022	Barcelona	6	(1)
2022–2025	Club Brugge	105	(31)
2025–	Celta	30	(9)

International career^{‡}
2022–	Catalonia	3	(2)
- * Club domestic league appearances and goals as of 27 May 2026 ‡ National team caps and goals as of 28 May 2025

Ferran Jutglà Blanch (born 1 February 1999) is a Spanish professional footballer who plays as a forward for La Liga club Celta de Vigo.

Jutglà spent most of his youth at Espanyol, but made no first-team appearances and was released in 2021, going on to play nine games and score twice for Barcelona. In 2022, he signed for Club Brugge for €5.5 million, winning the Belgian Super Cup in his first game. In 2025, he returned to his home country after signing for Celta.

== Club career ==
=== Early career ===
Born in Sant Julià de Vilatorta, Barcelona, Catalonia, Jutglà joined Espanyol's youth setup in 2012, after representing CF Sant Julià de Vilatorta and Vic Riuprimer REFO FC. He was released by the former club in 2015, and subsequently returned to Vic. In 2017, after being a part of the squad of Unificación Bellvitge in the División de Honor, he returned to his hometown club Sant Julià to play in the last matches of the season; he played as a winger for the youth sides, while also featuring as a centre-back for the first team in Tercera Catalana.

In 2017, Jutglà signed for Sant Andreu. Initially joining the Juvenil A squad, he made his senior debut on 20 August of that year, playing the last 12 minutes in a 0–0 Tercera División home draw against Santboià. He scored his first senior goal on 3 September, netting his team's second in a 2–0 home win over Pobla de Mafumet.

On 14 February 2018, after eight first team matches, Jutglà was transferred to Valencia and immediately returned to the youth setup.

=== Espanyol ===
Released by Valencia, Jutglà returned to Espanyol on 18 July 2018, but was immediately loaned back to Sant Andreu for the 2018–19 season. There, he earned a monthly wage of € 700, which he spent in gas coming and going to trainings; he would later work as a lifeguard in three different pools in Osona to earn more money.

Back to the Pericos in July 2019, Julià was assigned to the B-team in Segunda División B. In July 2020, he was called up for the first team under manager Francisco Rufete for a La Liga game against Eibar, but did not play. On 22 June 2021, despite featuring regularly for the B's, Espanyol announced that Jutglà would leave the club at the expiration of his contract on 30 June.

=== Barcelona ===
On 22 June 2021, just hours after announcing his departure from Espanyol, Jutglà signed a one-year contract with city rivals FC Barcelona, being initially assigned to the reserves in Primera División RFEF. He made his debut for Barça B on 28 August, starting in a 1–1 home draw against Algeciras CF.

Jutglà scored his first goal for the B's on 24 September 2021, netting his team's second in a 2–1 home win over Linense. On 11 December, he was called up by first team manager Xavi to trainings.

On 12 December 2021, Jutglà made his first team – and La Liga – debut for Barcelona, coming on as a late substitute for goalscorer Abde Ezzalzouli in a 2–2 away draw against Osasuna. On his first match as a starter six days later, he scored the opener of a 3–2 home win over Elche. On 26 May, he announced his departure from the club in a Twitter post.

=== Club Brugge ===
On 8 June 2022, Club Brugge announced the signing of Jutglà on a four-year deal for a transfer fee of €5 million. He made his debut on 17 July, starting in their 1–0 Belgian Super Cup victory over Gent. On 13 September, he converted a penalty in a 4–0 away Champions League group win away to Porto, his first goal in the competition. He was the league season's joint ninth top scorer with 13 goals, including his first career hat-trick on 23 April 2023 in a 7–0 win at home to Eupen.

Jutglà scored both goals on 18 April 2024 in the UEFA Europa Conference League quarter-final second leg away to PAOK in Greece, making Club Brugge the first Belgian club to reach the last four of a European competition since 1993.

=== Celta ===
On 24 June 2025, RC Celta de Vigo announced the signing of Jutglà in a four-year contract.

== International career ==
On 24 May 2022, Jutglà was called up by manager Gerard López of the unofficial Catalonia national football team for a match against Jamaica in Girona, replacing Dani Olmo. In the game the following day, he came on in the 59th minute for hat-trick scorer Gerard Deulofeu and scored the fifth goal of a 6–0 win.

== Career statistics ==
=== Club ===
As of match played 23 May 2026

Appearances and goals by club, season and competition
Club	Season	League			National cup (Note: Includes Copa del Rey, Belgian Cup)		Europe		Other		Total	
Club	Season	Division	Apps	Goals	Apps	Goals	Apps	Goals	Apps	Goals	Apps	Goals
Sant Julià de Vilatorta	2016–17	Tercera Catalana	6	0	—		—		—		6	0
Sant Andreu	2017–18	Tercera División	8	1	—		—		—		8	1
Sant Andreu	2018–19	Tercera División	39	7	4	0	—		—		43	7
Sant Andreu	Total		47	8	4	0	—		—		51	8
Espanyol B	2019–20	Segunda División B	24	7	—		—		—		24	7
Espanyol B	2020–21	Segunda División B	28	5	—		—		—		28	5
Espanyol B	Total		52	12	—		—		—		52	12
Barcelona B	2021–22	Primera División RFEF	32	19	—		—		—		32	19
Barcelona	2021–22	La Liga	6	1	2	1	0	0	1 (Note: Appearance in Supercopa de España)	0	9	2
Club Brugge	2022–23	Belgian Pro League	34	13	1	0	8 (Note: Appearances in UEFA Champions League)	2	1 (Note: Appearance in Belgian Super Cup)	0	44	15
Club Brugge	2023–24	Belgian Pro League	35	8	3	1	12 (Note: Appearances in UEFA Europa Conference League)	2	—		50	11
Club Brugge	2024–25	Belgian Pro League	36	10	5	2	12	2	1	0	54	14
Club Brugge	Total		105	31	9	3	32	6	2	0	148	40
Celta Vigo	2025–26	La Liga	30	9	2	0	12 (Note: Appearances in UEFA Europa League)	1	—		44	10
Career total			278	80	17	4	44	7	3	0	342	91

== Honours ==
Club Brugge

- Belgian Pro League: 2023–24
- Belgian Cup: 2024–25
- Belgian Super Cup: 2022

Individual

- Pro League Awards Goal of the Season: 2023–24
