= Lynnt Audoor =

Belgian footballer

Personal information
- Date of birth: 13 October 2003 (age 23)
- Place of birth: Merelbeke, Belgium
- Height: 6 ft 0 in (1.84 m)
- Position: Midfielder

Team information
- Current team: Club Brugge
- Number: 62

Youth career
- Club Brugge

Senior career*
Years	Team	Apps	(Gls)
2020–2025	Club NXT	50	(10)
2022–	Club Brugge	12	(0)
2023–2024	→ Kortrijk (loan)	11	(0)

International career^{‡}
2018–2019	Belgium U16	2	(0)
2019–2020	Belgium U17	7	(0)
2021–2022	Belgium U19	10	(1)
- * Club domestic league appearances and goals as of 9 May 2026 ‡ National team caps and goals as of 29 March 2022

Lynnt Audoor (born 13 October 2003) is a Belgian professional footballer who plays as a midfielder for Belgian Pro League club Club Brugge.

== Club career ==
Audoor began his career at the youth academy of Club Brugge. On 20 September 2020, Audoor made his debut for Brugge's reserve side, Club NXT in the Belgian First Division B against Lierse. He came on as a 78th-minute substitute as NXT lost 1–2.

On 12 July 2023, Audoor joined Kortrijk on a season-long loan.

== Career statistics ==
=== Club ===
As of match played 9 May 2026

Appearances and goals by club, season and competition
Club	Season	League			Cup		Continental		Other		Total	
Club	Season	Division	Apps	Goals	Apps	Goals	Apps	Goals	Apps	Goals	Apps	Goals
Club NXT	2020–21	Challenger Pro League	17	0	—		—		—		17	0
Club NXT	2022–23	Challenger Pro League	7	1	—		—		—		7	1
Club NXT	2024–25	Challenger Pro League	20	7	—		—		—		20	7
Club NXT	Total		44	8	—		—		—		44	8
Club Brugge	2022–23	Belgian Pro League	6	0	1	0	1 (Note: Appearances in UEFA Champions League)	0	1 (Note: Appearance in Belgian Super Cup)	0	9	0
Club Brugge	2025–26	Belgian Pro League	6	0	0	0	4	0	1	0	11	0
Club Brugge	Total		12	0	1	0	5	0	2	0	20	0
Kortrijk (loan)	2023–24	Belgian Pro League	11	0	—		—		—		11	0
Career total			67	8	1	0	5	0	2	0	75	8

== Honours ==
Club Brugge

- Belgian Cup: 2024–25
