= Nick Shinton =

Belgian footballer

Personal information
- Date of birth: 10 May 2001 (age 25)
- Place of birth: Aalst, Belgium
- Height: 1.93 m (6 ft 4 in)
- Position: Goalkeeper

Team information
- Current team: Sønderjyske

Youth career
- Dender
- Gent
- 2016–2020: Club Brugge

Senior career*
Years	Team	Apps	(Gls)
2020–2021	Club NXT	49	(0)
2020–2024	Club Brugge	0	(0)
2024–2026	Beerschot	53	(0)
2026–	Sønderjyske	0	(0)

International career^{‡}
2015–2016	Belgium U15	3	(0)
2016–2017	Belgium U16	3	(0)
2017–2018	Belgium U17	8	(0)
2018–2019	Belgium U18	5	(0)
2019–2020	Belgium U19	5	(0)
- * Club domestic league appearances and goals as of 19 April 2026 ‡ National team caps and goals as of 18:32, 2 November 2020 (UTC)

Nick Shinton (born 10 May 2001) is a Belgian professional footballer who plays as a goalkeeper for Danish Superliga club Sønderjyske.

== Club career ==
Shinton joined the youth academy of Club Brugge in 2016. On 22 August 2020, Shinton made his debut for Brugge's reserve side, Club NXT in the Belgian First Division B against RWDM47. He started as NXT lost 0–2.

On 23 July 2024, Shinton signed a multi-year contract with Beerschot.

On 4 September 2026, Shinton joined Sønderjyske in Denmark on a three-season deal.

== Career statistics ==
As of match played 16 October 2020

Appearances and goals by club, season and competition
Club	Season	League			Cup		Other		Total	
Club	Season	Division	Apps	Goals	Apps	Goals	Apps	Goals	Apps	Goals
Club NXT	2020–21	Belgian First Division B	4	0	—		—		4	0
Career total			4	0	0	0	0	0	4	0

== Honours ==
Club Brugge

- Belgian Super Cup: 2021
