= 2023–24 Club Brugge KV season =

Club Brugge KV
2023–24 season
- President: Bart Verhaeghe
- Head coach: Ronny Deila (until 17 March); Nicky Hayen (from 18 March)
- Stadium: Jan Breydel Stadium
- Champions' Play-offs: 1st
- Belgian Pro League Regular season: 4th
- Belgian Cup: Semi-finals
- UEFA Europa Conference League: Semi-finals
- Top goalscorer: League: Igor Thiago (18); All: Igor Thiago (29)
- Highest home attendance: 24,206 vs Osasuna
- Lowest home attendance: 15,835 vs Bodø/Glimt
- Average home league attendance: 21,702
- Biggest win: Club Brugge 7–1 RWD Molenbeek
Home colours	Away colours	Third colours

The 2023–24 season was Club Brugge KV's 132nd season in existence and 64th consecutive in the Belgian Pro League. They also competed in the Belgian Cup and the UEFA Europa Conference League.

== Players ==
=== First-team squad ===
As of 22 January 2024

Note: Flags indicate national team as defined under FIFA eligibility rules; some limited exceptions apply. Players may hold more than one non-FIFA nationality.

No.	Pos.	Nation	Player
4	DF	ECU	Joel Ordóñez
6	DF	GHA	Denis Odoi
7	FW	DEN	Andreas Skov Olsen
8	FW	POL	Michał Skóraś
9	FW	ESP	Ferran Jutglà
10	MF	NOR	Hugo Vetlesen
11	FW	ESP	Víctor Barberà
14	DF	NED	Bjorn Meijer
15	MF	NGR	Raphael Onyedika
20	MF	BEL	Hans Vanaken (captain)
21	GK	ENG	Josef Bursik
22	GK	BEL	Simon Mignolet
27	MF	DEN	Casper Nielsen

No.	Pos.	Nation	Player
28	DF	BEL	Dedryck Boyata
29	GK	BEL	Nordin Jackers (on loan from OH Leuven)
32	FW	NOR	Antonio Nusa
33	GK	BEL	Nick Shinton
39	MF	COL	Éder Álvarez Balanta
44	DF	BEL	Brandon Mechele
55	DF	BEL	Maxim De Cuyper
58	DF	BEL	Jorne Spileers
62	FW	JPN	Shion Homma
64	DF	BEL	Kyriani Sabbe
68	FW	BEL	Chemsdine Talbi
77	MF	DEN	Philip Zinckernagel
99	FW	BRA	Igor Thiago

=== Other players under contract ===
Note: Flags indicate national team as defined under FIFA eligibility rules; some limited exceptions apply. Players may hold more than one non-FIFA nationality.

No.	Pos.	Nation	Player
—	MF	USA	Owen Otasowie

=== Out on loan ===
Note: Flags indicate national team as defined under FIFA eligibility rules; some limited exceptions apply. Players may hold more than one non-FIFA nationality.

No.	Pos.	Nation	Player
—	MF	BEL	Lynnt Audoor (at Kortrijk until 30 June 2024)
—	MF	BEL	Cisse Sandra (at Excelsior until 30 June 2024)
—	MF	GHA	Kamal Sowah (at Standard Liège until 30 June 2024)

No.	Pos.	Nation	Player
—	FW	FRA	Faitout Maouassa (at Granada until 30 June 2024)
—	FW	BEL	Romeo Vermant (at Westerlo until 30 June 2024)
—	FW	UKR	Roman Yaremchuk (at Valencia until 30 June 2024)

== Transfers ==
=== In ===
Pos.	Player	Transferred from	Fee	Date	Source
FW	(Brazil) Igor Thiago	(Bulgaria) Ludogorets Razgrad	€7,900,000	1 July 2023	
MF	(Poland) Michał Skóraś	(Poland) Lech Poznań	€6,000,000	1 July 2023	
MF	(Norway) Hugo Vetlesen	(Norway) Bodø/Glimt	€7,750,000	3 July 2023	
MF	(Denmark) Philip Zinckernagel	(Greece) Olympiacos	€2,500,000	1 August 2023	
GK	(Belgium) Nordin Jackers	(Belgium) OH Leuven	Loan	1 August 2023	

=== Out ===
Pos.	Player	Transferred to	Fee	Date	Source
DF	(Angola) Clinton Mata	(France) Lyon	€5,000,000	6 July 2023	
FW	(Netherlands) Noa Lang	(Netherlands) PSV	€12,500,000	8 July 2023	
DF	(Ivory Coast) Abakar Sylla	(France) Strasbourg	€20,000,000	15 July 2023	
FW	(Ukraine) Roman Yaremchuk	(Spain) Valencia	Loan	1 September 2023	
DF	(France) Faitout Maouassa	(France) Lens	Loan	2 September 2023	

== Kits ==
Home	Away	Third	7 April 2024 (Note: Uniquely worn for the home game against Anderlecht during the Champions' Play-offs on April 7, 2024 that Brugge won 3–1. Context behind its creation was a special contest for the occasion held by the club. Kit designed by a 14-year old fan, a girl named Stien.)	Goalkeeper 1	Goalkeeper 2

== Pre-season and friendlies ==
Win Draw Loss

1 July 2023 Friendly	Club Brugge (Belgium)	0–1	(Belgium) Zulte Waregem	Roeselare
16:00 CEST (UTC+2)		Report	Demuynck 65'	Stadium: The NEST; Attendance: 5,000

8 July 2023 Friendly	Club Brugge (Belgium)	3–0	(Belgium) Beerschot	Knokke-Heist
13:00 CEST (UTC+2)	Vanaken 26'; Thiago 35'; Yaremchuk 53'	Report		Stadium: Complex Molenhoek; Attendance: 0

12 July 2023 Friendly	Feyenoord (Netherlands)	2–0	(Belgium) Club Brugge	Barendrecht
16:00 CEST (UTC+2)	Danilo 35'; Igor Paixão 38'	Report	Vermant (penalty missed) 67'; Sandra (penalty missed) 85'	Stadium: Sportpark Smitshoek

15 July 2023 Friendly	Go Ahead Eagles (Netherlands)	1–2	(Belgium) Club Brugge	Barendrecht
12:30 CEST (UTC+2)	Edvardsen 23'	Report	Onyedika 70'; Homma 85'	Stadium: Sportpark Smitshoek

22 July 2023 Friendly	Club Brugge (Belgium)	1–2	(Netherlands) AZ Alkmaar	Bruges
15:00 CEST (UTC+2)	Skov Olsen 3'		De Wit 9'; Sugawara 64'	Stadium: Jan Breydel Stadium

10 January 2024 Friendly	Club Brugge (Belgium)	3–0	(Germany) 1. FC Nürnberg	Marbella, Spain
14:00 CET (UTC+1)	Vanaken 16'; Jutglà 69'; Barberà 82'
Note: Three periods of 45 minutes

== Competitions ==
=== Overall record ===
Competition	First match	Last match	Starting round	Final position	Record							
Competition	First match	Last match	Starting round	Final position	Pld	W	D	L	GF	GA	GD	Win %
Belgian Pro League Regular season	30 July 2023	17 March 2024	Matchday 1	4th	30	14	9	7	62	29	+33	46.67
Champions' Play-offs	1 April 2024	26 May 2024	Matchday 1	Winners	10	7	3	0	21	6	+15	70.00
Belgian Cup	1 November 2023	28 February 2024	Seventh round	Semi-finals	5	4	0	1	12	3	+9	80.00
UEFA Europa Conference League	27 July 2023	8 May 2024	Second qualifying round	Semi-finals	18	12	3	3	42	15	+27	66.67
Total					63	37	15	11	137	53	+84	58.73

Source: Soccerway

=== Belgian Pro League ===
==== Regular season ====
Pos	Team	Pld	W	D	L	GF	GA	GD	Pts	Qualification or relegation
2	Anderlecht	30	18	9	3	58	30	+28	63	Qualification for the champions' play-offs
3	Antwerp	30	14	10	6	55	27	+28	52	Qualification for the champions' play-offs
4	Club Brugge	30	14	9	7	62	29	+33	51	Qualification for the champions' play-offs
5	Cercle Brugge	30	14	5	11	44	34	+10	47	Qualification for the champions' play-offs
6	Genk	30	12	11	7	51	31	+20	47	Qualification for the champions' play-offs

Source: Jupiler Pro League (in Dutch), Soccerway
Rules for classification: 1) Points; 2) Matches won; 3) Goal difference; 4) Goals scored; 5) Away matches won; 6) Away goal difference; 7) Away goals scored; 8) Play-off.

==== Results summary ====
Overall								Home						Away					
Pld	W	D	L	GF	GA	GD	Pts	W	D	L	GF	GA	GD	W	D	L	GF	GA	GD
30	14	9	7	62	29	+33	51	8	6	1	35	14	+21	6	3	6	27	15	+12

Source: Worldfootball

==== Results by round ====
Round	1	2	3	4	5	6	7	8	9	10	11	12	13	14	15	16	17	18	19	20	21	22	23	24	25	26	27	28	29	30
Ground	H	A	A	H	H	A	H	A	H	A	A	H	A	H	A	H	A	H	A	H	H	A	H	A	H	A	H	A	H	A
Result	D	W	W	W	D	L	W	D	D	L	L	W	L	D	W	W	D	W	W	D	W	W	D	L	W	D	L	W	W	L
Position	11	5	3	1	2	4	3	3	4	5	7	6	7	7	7	5	6	6	4	4	4	3	3	4	4	3	4	4	4	4

Source: Worldfootball
A = Away; H = Home; W = Win; D = Draw; L = Loss

==== Matches ====
The league fixtures were unveiled on 22 June 2023.

30 July 2023 1	Club Brugge	1–1	Mechelen	Bruges
18:30 CEST (UTC+2)	De Cuyper (yellow card) 37' (yellow-red card) 77'; Thiago 65'	Report	Ngoy (yellow card) 14'; Foulon (yellow card) 26'; Schoofs 38'	Stadium: Jan Breydel Stadium; Attendance: 19,593; Referee: Bert Put

6 August 2023 2	Westerlo	0–1	Club Brugge	Westerlo
18:30 CEST (UTC+2)	Van den Keybus (yellow card) 79'	Report	Thiago 36'	Stadium: Het Kuipje; Attendance: 8,034; Referee: Jan Boterberg

13 August 2023 3	Eupen	0–5	Club Brugge	Eupen
16:00 CEST (UTC+2)		Report	Skov Olsen 6' (pen.), 62'; Zinckernagel 17', 66'; Buchanan 29'; Mechele (yellow card) 59'; Yaremchuk (yellow card) 90+1'	Stadium: Kehrwegstadion; Attendance: 4,364; Referee: Lothar D'hondt

20 August 2023 4	Club Brugge	7–1	RWD Molenbeek	Bruges
18:30 CEST (UTC+2)	Zinckernagel 15'; Skov Olsen 19', 62'; Thiago 52'; Nusa 74'; Buchanan 78'; Abner 90+2' (o.g.)	Report	Da Silva 17'; Diallo (yellow card) 29'	Stadium: Jan Breydel Stadium; Attendance: 20,399; Referee: Wesli De Cremer

3 September 2023 6	Gent	2–1	Club Brugge	Ghent
13:30 CEST (UTC+2)	Hong 25', 49'; Fadiga (yellow card) 79' (yellow-red card) 82'	Report	Vanaken 43'	Stadium: Ghelamco Arena; Attendance: 19,507; Referee: Jasper Vergoote

16 September 2023 7	Club Brugge	4–2	Charleroi	Bruges
20:45 CEST (UTC+2)	Thiago 27'; Mechele 45'; Vanaken (yellow card) 74'; Onyedika (yellow card) 76'; Nusa 87'; Jutglà 90+5'	Report	Guiagon 5'; Dragsnes 42'; Andreou (yellow card) 58'; Bager (yellow card) 62'; Zorgane (yellow card) 76'	Stadium: Jan Breydel Stadium; Attendance: 18,878; Referee: Bram Van Driessche

24 September 2023 8	Anderlecht	1–1	Club Brugge	Anderlecht
18:30 CEST (UTC+2)	Dolberg 40'	Report	Vetlesen (yellow card) 13'; Skov Olsen 64'	Stadium: Constant Vanden Stock Stadium; Attendance: 19,364; Referee: Lawrence Visser

28 September 2023 5	Club Brugge	1–1	Genk	Bruges
20:45 CEST (UTC+2)	Vanaken 67'	Report	El Khannous 45+1'	Stadium: Jan Breydel Stadium; Attendance: 20,220; Referee: Jonathan Lardot
Note: The match scheduled for 27 August 2023 was postponed due to the UEFA Conference League play-offs.

1 October 2023 9	Club Brugge	1–1	Sint-Truiden	Bruges
18:30 CET (UTC+1)	Skov Olsen 47'	Report	Koita 66'	Stadium: Jan Breydel Stadium; Attendance: 20,146; Referee: Nicolas Laforge

8 October 2023 10	Standard Liège	2–1	Club Brugge	Liège
13:30 CEST (UTC+2)	Bokadi 12'; Price 90'	Report	Skov Olsen 86'	Stadium: Stade Maurice Dufrasne; Referee: Erik Lambrechts

21 October 2023 11	Kortrijk	1–0	Club Brugge	Kortrijk
16:00 CEST (UTC+2)	Davies 36'	Report	Skov Olsen (penalty missed) 72'	Stadium: Guldensporen Stadion; Referee: Kevin Van Damme

29 October 2023 12	Club Brugge	2–1	Antwerp	Bruges
13:30 CET (UTC+1)	Jutglà 45'; Vanaken 90'	Report	Ilenikhena 72'	Stadium: Jan Breydel Stadium; Attendance: 23,724; Referee: Bram Van Driessche

5 November 2023 13	Union Saint-Gilloise	2–1	Club Brugge	Brussels
18:30 CET (UTC+1)	Amoura 22', 68'; Rodríguez (penalty missed) 90+6'	Report	De Cuyper 60'	Stadium: Joseph Marien Stadium; Referee: Jasper Vergoote

12 November 2023 14	Club Brugge	0–0	Cercle Brugge	Bruges
13:30 CET (UTC+1)		Report		Stadium: Jan Breydel Stadium; Attendance: 24,323; Referee: Erik Lambrechts

26 November 2023 15	OH Leuven	0–1	Club Brugge	Leuven
16:00 CET (UTC+1)		Report	Jutglà 45+2'	Stadium: Den Dreef; Attendance: 8,138; Referee: Nathan Verboomen

3 December 2023 16	Club Brugge	2–0	Standard Liège	Bruges
18:30 CET (UTC+1)	Thiago 3'; Zinckernagel 55'	Report		Stadium: Jan Breydel Stadium; Attendance: 19,471; Referee: Jasper Vergoote

10 December 2023 17	Mechelen	0–0	Club Brugge	Mechelen
13:30 CET (UTC+1)		Report		Stadium: AFAS Stadion; Attendance: 14,725; Referee: Nicolas Laforge

17 December 2023 18	Club Brugge	2–0	Gent	Bruges
13:30 CET (UTC+1)	Thiago 24' (pen.), 41' (pen.)	Report	Kandouss (red card) 40'	Stadium: Jan Breydel Stadium; Referee: Jonathan Lardot

22 December 2023 19	RWDM	1–6	Club Brugge	Molenbeek-Saint-Jean
20:45 CET (UTC+1)	Camara 56'	Report	Thiago 9', 55' (pen.), 64'; Zinckernagel 13'; Skov Olsen 45+1'; Vanaken 72'	Stadium: Edmond Machtens Stadium; Referee: Brent Staessens

26 December 2023 20	Club Brugge	1–1	Union Saint-Gilloise	Bruges
20:45 CET (UTC+1)	Thiago 56' (pen.), (yellow card) 90+10'; Odoi (yellow card) 75'; Spileers (yellow card) 84'	Report	Burgess (yellow card) 21'; Nilsson 27'; Vanhoutte (yellow card) 66'; Amani (yellow card) 70'; Mac Allister (yellow card) 77'; Puertas (yellow card) 89'; Moris (red card) 90+5'; Lapoussin (yellow card) 90+10'	Stadium: Jan Breydel Stadium; Referee: Jasper Vergoote

20 January 2024 21	Club Brugge	3–0	Westerlo	Bruges
20:45 CET (UTC+1)	Thiago 37', 65' (pen.); Nusa 80'	Report		Stadium: Jan Breydel Stadium; Referee: Nicolas Laforge

27 January 2024 22	Charleroi	1–4	Club Brugge	Charleroi
20:45 CET (UTC+1)	Bernier 90+4'	Report	Mechele 12'; Nielsen 22'; Thiago 34', 54'; Álvarez Balanta (yellow card) 67'	Stadium: Stade du Pays de Charleroi; Referee: Bert Put

30 January 2024 23	Club Brugge	3–3	Kortrijk	Bruges
20:30 CET (UTC+1)	Zinckernagel 16'; Mechele 77'; Thiago 86'	Report	Afolabi 53'; Bruno 68'; Seck 90+7'	Stadium: Jan Breydel Stadium; Attendance: 16,106; Referee: Jonathan Lardot

4 February 2024 24	Antwerp	2–1	Club Brugge	Antwerp
13:30 CET (UTC+1)	Janssen (yellow card) 19'; Corbanie 86'; Ondrejka 90+9'; Muja (yellow card) 90+12'	Report	Vetlesen (yellow card) 25'; Skóraś (yellow card) 27'; Thiago (yellow card) 45'; De Cuyper 54'; Boyata (yellow card) 82'; Vanaken (yellow card) 90+13' (yellow-red card) 90+13'	Stadium: Bosuilstadion; Attendance: 14,753; Referee: Jasper Vergoote

10 February 2024 25	Club Brugge	4–0	Eupen	Bruges
20:45 CET (UTC+1)	Nielsen 14'; Jutglà 30'; Skov Olsen 75'; Mechele 78'	Report	Baiye (yellow card) 73'	Stadium: Jan Breydel Stadium; Referee: Jan Boterberg

18 February 2024 26	Cercle Brugge	1–1	Club Brugge	Bruges
13:30 CET (UTC+1)	Minda 58'	Report	Thiago (yellow card) 44' (yellow-red card) 90+7'; Jutglà 81'; Odoi (yellow card) 90+5'	Stadium: Jan Breydel Stadium; Referee: Jonathan Lardot

25 February 2024 27	Club Brugge	1–2	Anderlecht	Bruges
13:30 CET (UTC+1)	Jutglà 18'	Report	Vázquez 79'; Angulo 90+1'	Stadium: Jan Breydel Stadium; Referee: Erik Lambrechts

3 March 2024 28	Genk	0–3	Club Brugge	Genk
13:30 CET (UTC+1)	Arokodare (penalty missed) 18'	Report	Vetlesen 26'; Odoi 73'; Skov Olsen 85' (pen.)	Stadium: Cegeka Arena; Referee: Jasper Vergoote

10 March 2024 29	Club Brugge	3–1	OH Leuven	Bruges
16:00 CET (UTC+1)	Leysen 40' (o.g.); Vanaken 62'; Meijer 64'	Report	Pletinckx 31'	Stadium: Jan Breydel Stadium; Referee: Jan Boterberg

17 March 2024 30	Sint-Truiden	2–1	Club Brugge	Sint-Truiden
13:30 CET (UTC+1)	Zahiroleslam 59'; Kaya (penalty missed) 81'; Koita 85'	Report	Jutglà 6'	Stadium: Stayen; Referee: Kevin van Damme

==== Results summary ====
Overall								Home						Away					
Pld	W	D	L	GF	GA	GD	Pts	W	D	L	GF	GA	GD	W	D	L	GF	GA	GD
10	7	3	0	21	6	+15	24	3	2	0	12	3	+9	4	1	0	9	3	+6

Source: Worldfootball

==== Results by round ====
Round	1	2	3	4	5	6	7	8	9	10
Ground	A	H	H	A	H	A	A	H	A	H
Result	D	W	W	W	W	W	W	D	W	D
Position	3	3	3	2	2	2	1	2	1	1

Source: Worldfootball
A = Away; H = Home; W = Win; D = Draw; L = Loss

==== Matches ====
1 April 2024 1	Cercle Brugge	1–1	Club Brugge	Bruges
13:30 CEST (UTC+2)	Denkey 32'	Report	Onyedika (yellow card) 64'; Skov Olsen 83'	Stadium: Jan Breydel Stadium; Attendance: 8,762; Referee: Erik Lambrechts

7 April 2024 2	Club Brugge	3–1	Anderlecht	Bruges
18:30 CEST (UTC+2)	Mechele 3'; Onyedika 61', 89', (yellow card) 90+1'	Report	Hazard (yellow card) 29'; Delaney (yellow card) 45+1'; Ashimeru (yellow card) 66'; Sardella (yellow card) 84'; Dreyer 90+1'; Augustinsson (yellow card) 90+5'	Stadium: Jan Breydel Stadium; Attendance: 24,166; Referee: Jonathan Lardot

14 April 2024 3	Club Brugge	3–0	Antwerp	Bruges
13:30 CEST (UTC+2)	Onyedika 44', (yellow card) 51'; Thiago (yellow card) 49'; Skóraś 60'; Zinckernagel 90+6'	Report	Van Den Bosch (yellow card) 60'; Balikwisha (yellow card) 81'	Stadium: Jan Breydel Stadium; Attendance: 22,934; Referee: Bram van Driessche

21 April 2024 4	Union Saint-Gilloise	1–2	Club Brugge	Brussels
18:30 CEST (UTC+2)	Amoura (yellow card) 60'; Puertas 82'; Lapoussin (yellow card) 90+2'; Castro-Montes (yellow card) 90+4'	Report	Vetlesen (yellow card) 49' (yellow-red card) 65', (goal) 52'; Meijer 74'; Odoi (yellow card) 90+5'	Stadium: Joseph Marien Stadium; Attendance: 7,417; Referee: Jasper Vergoote

24 April 2024 5	Club Brugge	4–0	Genk	Bruges
20:30 CEST (UTC+2)	Jutglà 6'; Skóraś 51'; Thiago 57'; De Cuyper 67'	Report	Arokodare (yellow card) 43'	Stadium: Jan Breydel Stadium; Attendance: 22,122; Referee: Lothar D'hondt

28 April 2024 6	Genk	0–3	Club Brugge	Genk
13:30 CEST (UTC+2)	Cuesta (yellow card) 22'	Report	Sabbe 38'; Vetlesen (yellow card) 61', (goal) 67'; Thiago 71'; Nielsen (yellow card) 90'	Stadium: Cegeka Arena; Attendance: 18,569; Referee: Lawrence Wisser

5 May 2024 7	Antwerp	1–2	Club Brugge	Antwerp
13:30 CEST (UTC+2)	Janssen (yellow card) 1'; Van Den Bosch (yellow card) 55'; Balikwisha 67' (pen.); Coulibaly (yellow card) 90+4'	Report	Alderweireld 48' (o.g.); Skov Olsen 63'; Ordóñez (yellow card) 65'	Stadium: Bosuilstadion; Attendance: 13,100; Referee: Jasper Vergoote

13 May 2024 8	Club Brugge	2–2	Union Saint-Gilloise	Bruges
20:30 CEST (UTC+2)	Onyedika (yellow card) 33'; Skov Olsen 57', 72'	Report	Teklab 48'; Castro-Montes (yellow card) 71'; Machida 84'; Burgess (yellow card) 90+5'	Stadium: Jan Breydel Stadium; Attendance: 24,526; Referee: Jonathan Lardot

19 May 2024 9	Anderlecht	0–1	Club Brugge	Anderlecht
18:30 CEST (UTC+2)	Debast (yellow card) 88'	Report	Vetlesen (yellow card) 4'; Odoi 29', (yellow card) 83'; De Cuyper (yellow card) 85'	Stadium: Lotto Park; Attendance: 19,632; Referee: Erik Lambrechts

26 May 2024 10	Club Brugge	0–0	Cercle Brugge	Bruges
18:30 CEST (UTC+2)	Odoi (yellow card) 60'	Report		Stadium: Jan Breydel Stadium; Referee: Jonathan Lardot

=== Belgian Cup ===
1 November 2023 Seventh round	Beerschot	0–6	Club Brugge	Antwerp
20:45 CET (UTC+1)	Van Himbeeck (yellow card) 48'	Report	Thiago 4'; Skov Olsen 22', 43'; Odoi 30'; Vetlesen 33', 54'	Stadium: Olympisch Stadion; Referee: Simon Bourdeaud'hui

6 December 2023 Eighth round	Club Brugge	4–0	Zulte Waregem	Bruges
20:45 CET (UTC+1)	Skov Olsen 16'; Skóraś 20'; Thiago 50', 58'	Report	Tambedou (yellow card) 11'	Stadium: Jan Breydel Stadium; Referee: Lothar D'hondt

16 January 2024 Quarter-finals	Gent	0–1	Club Brugge	Ghent
20:45 CET (UTC+1)	De Sart (yellow card) 37'; Samoise (yellow card) 68'; Brown (yellow card) 75'; Orban (yellow card) 79'	Report	Thiago 17'; Skov Olsen (yellow card) 60'; Álvarez Balanta (yellow card) 75'	Stadium: Ghelamco Arena; Referee: Erik Lambrechts

7 February 2024 Semi-finals; First leg	Club Brugge	2–1	Union Saint-Gilloise	Brugge
20:45	Skov Olsen 10', (yellow card) 67'; Mechele (yellow card) 30'; Spileers (yellow card) 36'; Blanch 46'; Odoi (yellow card) 78'	Report	Lapoussin (yellow card) 31'; Amoura (yellow card) 67'; Machida 90+2'; Burgess (yellow card) 90+3'	Stadium: Jan Breydel Stadium; Referee: Bram Van Driessche

28 February 2024 Semi-finals; Second leg	Union Saint-Gilloise	2–0 (3–2 agg.)	Club Brugge	Brussels
20:30	Rasmussen (yellow card) 50'; Amoura 73'; Vanhoutte (yellow card) 86'; Sykes 90+2'	Report	Vanaken (yellow card) 43'; De Cuyper (red card) 90+9'	Stadium: Joseph Marien Stadium; Referee: Lothar D'hondt

=== UEFA Europa Conference League ===
==== Second qualifying round ====
The draw for the second qualifying round was held on 21 June 2023.

27 July 2023 First leg	Club Brugge (Belgium)	3–0	(Denmark) AGF	Bruges
20:00 CEST (UTC+2)	Mechele (yellow card) 5'; Buchanan 10'; Rits 48'; Vetlesen 76'	Report	Mølgaard (yellow card) 29'; Kristensen (yellow card) 53'	Stadium: Jan Breydel Stadium; Attendance: 18,925; Referee: Goga Kikacheishvili (Georgia)

3 August 2023 Second leg	AGF (Denmark)	1–0 (1–3 agg.)	(Belgium) Club Brugge	Aarhus, Denmark
20:00 CEST (UTC+2)	Beijmo 3'; Bech (yellow card) 41'; Akoto (yellow card) 44'; Knudsen (yellow card) 61'	Report	Skov Olsen (yellow card) 41'; Vermant (yellow card) 45+1'; Rits (yellow card) 90+3'	Stadium: Aarhus Stadium; Attendance: 12,651; Referee: Atilla Karaoğlan (Turkey)

==== Third qualifying round ====
The draw for the third qualifying round was held on 24 July 2023.

10 August 2023 First leg	Club Brugge (Belgium)	5–1	(Iceland) KA	Bruges
20:00 CEST (UTC+2)	Vetlesen (yellow card) 2'; Spileers 10'; Vanaken 40'; Skov Olsen 41'; Thiago 45' (pen.); Yaremchuk 77'	Report	Sigurgeirsson (yellow card) 31'; Willard 60', (yellow card) 90+2'	Stadium: Jan Breydel Stadium; Attendance: 16,811; Referee: Miloš Milanović (Serbia)

17 August 2023 Second leg	KA (Iceland)	1–5 (2–10 agg.)	(Belgium) Club Brugge	Reykjavík, Iceland
18:00 UTC+0	Aðalsteinsson (yellow card) 10'; Petersen 59'; Elísson (yellow card) 63'; Edmundsson (yellow card) 76' (yellow-red card) 90+2'	Report	Boyata 7'; Odoi (yellow card) 41'; Skóraś 45+3'; Yaremchuk 57', 66', 75'; Zinckernagel (yellow card) 60'	Stadium: Laugardalsvöllur; Attendance: 935; Referee: Michael Fabbri (Italy)
Note: KA played their third qualifying round home match at the Laugardalsvöllur in Reykjavík, instead of their regular stadium, the Greifavöllurinn in Akureyri, which does not meet UEFA requirements

==== Play-off round ====
The draw for the play-off round was held on 7 August 2023.

24 August 2023 First leg	Osasuna (Spain)	1–2	(Belgium) Club Brugge	Pamplona, Spain
20:30 CEST (UTC+2)	Mojica (yellow card) 29'; D. García (yellow card) 37'; Ávila 78'	Report	Buchanan (yellow card) 45+3'; Skov Olsen 50', (yellow card) 67'; Onyedika (yellow card) 51'; Thiago (yellow card) 52'; De Cuyper 80'; Mignolet (yellow card) 88'	Stadium: El Sadar Stadium; Attendance: 21,985; Referee: Benoît Millot (France)

31 August 2023 Second leg	Club Brugge (Belgium)	2–2 (4–3 agg.)	(Spain) Osasuna	Bruges
20:00 CEST (UTC+2)	Mechele (yellow card) 10'; De Cuyper (yellow card) 30'; Skov Olsen (yellow card) 45', (goal) 76'; Vetlesen (yellow card) 71'; Thiago 73', (yellow card) 74'; Mignolet (yellow card) 90+12'	Report	Mojica 27', (yellow card) 76'; Ávila (yellow card) 30'; Gómez (yellow card) 45+1'; Moncayola (yellow card) 45+4'; Budimir 53'; Fernández (yellow card) 66'; Herrera (yellow card) 67'; D. García (yellow card) 87'; Catena (yellow card) 90+8'	Stadium: Jan Breydel Stadium; Attendance: 24,206; Referee: Daniel Stefański (Poland)

==== Group stage ====
The draw for the group stage was held on 1 September 2023.

Pos	Team	Pld	W	D	L	GF	GA	GD	Pts	Qualification	BRU	BOD	BEŞ	LUG
1	(Belgium) Club Brugge	6	5	1	0	15	3	+12	16	Advance to round of 16	—	3–1	1–1	2–0
2	(Norway) Bodø/Glimt	6	3	1	2	11	8	+3	10	Advance to knockout round play-offs	0–1	—	3–1	5–2
3	(Turkey) Beşiktaş	6	1	1	4	7	14	−7	4 (Note: Ranked on head-to-head goal difference: Beşiktaş +1, Lugano –1.)		0–5	1–2	—	2–3
4	(Switzerland) Lugano	6	1	1	4	6	14	−8	4		1–3	0–0	0–2	—

Source: UEFA
Rules for classification: Group stage tiebreakers
Notes:

21 September 2023 1	Club Brugge (Belgium)	1–1	(Turkey) Beşiktaş	Bruges
21:00 CEST (UTC+2)	Mechele (yellow card) 40'; Onyedika (yellow card) 74'; Vanaken 77', (yellow card) 90+1'; Vetlesen (yellow card) 79'; Spileers (yellow card) 86'; Mignolet (yellow card) 89'	Report	Amartey (yellow card) 45+2'; Tosun 88'	Stadium: Jan Breydel Stadium; Attendance: 18,442; Referee: Aleksei Kulbakov (Belarus)

5 October 2023 2	Bodø/Glimt (Norway)	0–1	(Belgium) Club Brugge	Bodø, Norway
18:45 CEST (UTC+2)		Report	Vanaken 20'	Stadium: Aspmyra Stadion; Attendance: 7,481; Referee: Ondřej Berka (Czech Republic)

26 October 2023 3	Lugano (Switzerland)	1–3	(Belgium) Club Brugge	Geneva, Switzerland
18:45 CEST (UTC+2)	Vladi 74'	Report	Balanta 15'; Skov Olsen 50'; Vanaken 87'	Stadium: Stade de Genève; Attendance: 4,037; Referee: Ovidiu Hațegan (Romania)

9 November 2023 4	Club Brugge (Belgium)	2–0	(Switzerland) Lugano	Bruges
21:00 CET (UTC+1)	Thiago 62' (pen.); Vanaken 90+6'	Report		Stadium: Jan Breydel Stadium; Attendance: 16,493; Referee: Tamás Bognár (Hungary)

30 November 2023 5	Beşiktaş (Turkey)	0–5	(Belgium) Club Brugge	Istanbul, Turkey
18:45 TRT (UTC+3)		Report	Nielsen 4'; Thiago 14', 46'; Onyedika 50'; Skov Olsen 70'	Stadium: Beşiktaş Stadium; Attendance: 13,021; Referee: David Šmajc (Slovenia)

14 December 2023 6	Club Brugge (Belgium)	3–1	(Norway) Bodø/Glimt	Bruges
21:00 CET (UTC+1)	Nusa 26'; Thiago 58'; Mechele 89'	Report	Pellegrino 57' (pen.)	Stadium: Jan Breydel Stadium; Attendance: 15,835; Referee: Anastasios Papapetrou (Greece)

==== Knockout phase ====
===== Round of 16 =====
The draw for the round of 16 was held on 23 February 2024.

7 March 2024 First leg	Molde (Norway)	2–1	(Belgium) Club Brugge	Molde, Norway
18:45	Stenevik 43'; Hagelskjær (yellow card) 79'; Gulbrandsen 90+2'	Report	De Cuyper 85' (pen.)	Stadium: Aker Stadion; Attendance: 9,267; Referee: Filip Glova (Slovakia)

14 March 2024 Second leg	Club Brugge (Belgium)	3–0 (4–2 agg.)	(Norway) Molde	Bruges
21:00	Skov Olsen 45+1', 48'; Skóraś 70'; De Cuyper (yellow card) 88'	Report	Gulbrandsen (yellow card) 88'	Stadium: Jan Breydel Stadium; Attendance: 11,858; Referee: Radu Petrescu (Romania)

===== Quarter-finals =====
The draw for the quarter-finals was held on 15 March 2024.

11 April 2024 First leg	Club Brugge (Belgium)	1–0	(Greece) PAOK	Bruges
21:00	Vetlesen 6'; Thiago (yellow card) 25', (penalty missed) 78'; De Cuyper (yellow card) 84'; Mechele (yellow card) 90'; Skóraś (yellow card) 90+2'	Report	Samatta (yellow card) 50'; Brandon (yellow card) 89'	Stadium: Jan Breydel Stadium; Attendance: 19,917; Referee: Daniel Siebert (Germany)

18 April 2024 Second leg	PAOK (Greece)	0–2 (0–3 agg.)	(Belgium) Club Brugge	Thessaloniki, Greece
21:00 (22:00 EEST)		Report	Jutglà 33', 45'	Stadium: Toumba Stadium; Attendance: 24,738; Referee: Davide Massa (Italy)

===== Semi-finals =====
The draw for the semi-finals was held on 15 March 2024, after the quarter-final draw.

2 May 2024 First leg	Fiorentina (Italy)	3–2	(Belgium) Club Brugge	Florence, Italy
21:00	Sottil 5'; González (yellow card) 36'; Belotti 37'; Martínez Quarta (yellow card) 70'; Nzola 90+1'	Report	Vanaken 17' (pen.); Onyedika (yellow card) 58' (yellow-red card) 61'; Thiago 63'; Jackers (yellow card) 85'	Stadium: Stadio Artemio Franchi; Attendance: 27,516; Referee: Michael Oliver (England)

8 May 2024 Second leg	Club Brugge (Belgium)	1–1 (3–4 agg.)	(Italy) Fiorentina	Bruges
18:45	De Cuyper 20'; Ordóñez (yellow card) 43'; Thiago (yellow card) 52'; Vetlesen (yellow card) 62'; Odoi (yellow card) 72' (yellow-red card) 90+4'; Mechele (yellow card) 82'	Report	Beltrán 85' (pen.); Milenković (yellow card) 88'; Dodô (yellow card) 90+4'; Nzola (yellow card) 90+6'	Stadium: Jan Breydel Stadium; Attendance: 26,936; Referee: Halil Umut Meler (Turkey)

== Statistics ==
=== Squad appearances and goals ===
Last updated on 26 May 2024

No.	Pos	Nat	Player	Total		Pro League		Belgian Cup		UEFA Europa Conference League	
No.	Pos	Nat	Player	Apps	Goals	Apps	Goals	Apps	Goals	Apps	Goals
Goalkeepers
21	GK	(England) ENG	Josef Bursik	0	0	0	0	0	0	0	0
22	GK	(Belgium) BEL	Simon Mignolet	51	0	32	0	5	0	14	0
29	GK	(Belgium) BEL	Nordin Jackers	14	0	8+1	0	0+1	0	4	0
33	GK	(Belgium) BEL	Nick Shinton	0	0	0	0	0	0	0	0
Defenders
4	DF	(Ecuador) ECU	Joel Ordóñez	33	0	15+4	0	3	0	6+5	0
6	DF	(Ghana) GHA	Denis Odoi	39	3	10+14	2	3	1	6+6	0
14	DF	(Netherlands) NED	Bjorn Meijer	41	2	21+6	2	5	0	6+3	0
28	DF	(Belgium) BEL	Dedryck Boyata	12	1	2+3	0	0+3	0	1+3	1
44	DF	(Belgium) BEL	Brandon Mechele	61	6	40	5	5	0	16	1
55	DF	(Belgium) BEL	Maxim De Cuyper	55	5	30+7	3	2	0	14+2	2
58	DF	(Belgium) BEL	Jorne Spileers	43	1	23+6	0	2	0	12	1
64	DF	(Belgium) BEL	Kyriani Sabbe	33	1	10+11	1	0	0	6+6	0
66	DF	(Ivory Coast) CIV	Bi Abdoul Kader Yameogo	1	0	0+1	0	0	0	0	0
Midfielders
10	FW	(Norway) NOR	Hugo Vetlesen	56	7	31+6	3	2+1	2	14+2	2
15	MF	(Nigeria) NGR	Raphael Onyedika	52	4	28+5	3	0+2	0	14+3	1
20	MF	(Belgium) BEL	Hans Vanaken	59	12	37+1	5	5	0	16	7
27	MF	(Denmark) DEN	Casper Nielsen	48	3	16+15	2	4	0	5+8	1
39	MF	(Colombia) COL	Éder Álvarez Balanta	32	1	4+17	0	4+1	0	2+4	1
77	MF	(Denmark) DEN	Philip Zinckernagel	44	7	21+8	7	0+3	0	7+5	0
Forwards
7	FW	(Denmark) DEN	Andreas Skov Olsen	50	26	27+6	14	5	5	11+1	7
8	FW	(Poland) POL	Michał Skóraś	47	4	12+16	2	1+3	0	9+6	2
9	FW	(Spain) ESP	Ferran Jutglà	50	11	17+18	8	2+1	1	6+6	2
11	FW	(Spain) ESP	Víctor Barberà	7	0	0+4	0	0+2	0	0+1	0
32	FW	(Norway) NOR	Antonio Nusa	46	4	15+15	3	2+1	0	5+8	1
62	FW	(Japan) JPN	Shion Homma	5	0	0+2	0	0+1	0	0+2	0
68	FW	(Belgium) BEL	Chemsdine Talbi	4	0	0+3	0	0	0	0+1	0
99	FW	(Brazil) BRA	Igor Thiago	55	29	29+5	18	5	4	14+2	7
Players who have made an appearance this season but have left the club
17	FW	(Canada) CAN	Tajon Buchanan	20	3	11+1	2	0	0	7+1	1
26	MF	(Belgium) BEL	Mats Rits	4	1	1+1	0	0	0	1+1	1
70	FW	(Ukraine) UKR	Roman Yaremchuk	5	4	0+3	0	0	0	1+1	4
76	FW	(Belgium) BEL	Romeo Vermant	3	0	0+1	0	0	0	1+1	0
