= 2024–25 Club Brugge KV season =

Club Brugge KV
2024–25 season
- President: Bart Verhaeghe
- Manager: Nicky Hayen
- Stadium: Jan Breydel Stadium
- Belgian Pro League: 2nd
- Belgian Cup: Winners
- Belgian Super Cup: Runners-up
- UEFA Champions League: Round of 16
- Top goalscorer: League: Christos Tzolis (16); All: Christos Tzolis (21)
- Highest home attendance: 25,978 vs Anderlecht
- Lowest home attendance: 18,000 vs Union Saint-Gilloise
- Average home league attendance: 22,496
- Biggest win: Club Brugge 7–0 Sint-Truiden
- Biggest defeat: Club Brugge 0–3 Borussia Dortmund; Aston Villa 3–0 Club Brugge
Home colours	Away colours	Third colours

The 2024–25 season was the 134th season in the history of Club Brugge KV, and the club's 65th consecutive season in the Belgian Pro League. In addition to the domestic league, the club participated in the Belgian Cup, the Belgian Super Cup and the UEFA Champions League.

== Summary ==
On 30 June, Club Brugge presented its new Argentine player, defender Zaid Romero, coming from Estudiantes de la Plata. On 4 July, Cisse Sandra extended his contract with the Blue and Black until 2027 and was sent on loan to the newcomer to the Dutch League, Willem II. On 23 July, goalkeeper Nick Shinton moved to newly promoted Beerschot. On 30 July, striker Roman Yaremchuk, who returned from loan, moved to Olympiacos permanently. On 13 August, winger Antonio Nusa moved permanently to RB Leipzig in the Bundesliga.

== Squad ==
Position	Number	Player	Date joined	Further data
GK	22	(Belgium) Simon Mignolet	2019	
GK	29	(Belgium) Nordin Jackers	2024	
GK	71	(Belgium) Axl De Corte	2023	
DF	65	(Belgium) Joaquin Seys	2024	
DF	4	(Ecuador) Joel Ordóñez	2023	
DF	14	(Netherlands) Bjorn Meijer	2022	
DF	44	(Belgium) Brandon Mechele	2013	
DF	55	(Belgium) Maxim De Cuyper	2020	
DF	58	(Belgium) Jorne Spileers	2022	
DF	64	(Belgium) Kyriani Sabbe	2023	
DF	2	(Argentina) Zaid Romero	2024	
DF	41	(Belgium) Hugo Siquet	2024	
MF	10	(Norway) Hugo Vetlesen	2023	
MF	15	(Nigeria) Raphael Onyedika	2022	
MF	20	(Belgium) Hans Vanaken	2015	Captain
MF	27	(Denmark) Casper Nielsen	2022	
MF	39	(Colombia) Éder Álvarez Balanta	2019	
MF	68	(Belgium) Chemsdine Talbi	2023	
MF	30	(Switzerland) Ardon Jashari	2024	
MF	8	(Greece) Christos Tzolis	2024	
FW	7	(Denmark) Andreas Skov Olsen	2022	
FW	21	(Poland) Michał Skóraś	2023	
FW	9	(Spain) Ferran Jutglà	2022	
FW	17	(Belgium) Romeo Vermant	2023	
FW	19	(Sweden) Gustaf Nilsson	2024	

== Transfers ==
=== In ===
Pos.	Player	Transferred from	Fee	Date	Source
FW	(Belgium) Romeo Vermant	(Belgium) Westerlo	Loan return	30 June 2024	
MF	(Belgium) Lynnt Audoor	(Belgium) Kortrijk	Loan return	30 June 2024	
FW	(Ghana) Kamal Sowah	(Belgium) Standard Liège	Loan return	30 June 2024	
FW	(Ukraine) Roman Yaremchuk	(Spain) Valencia	Loan return	30 June 2024	
DF	(France) Faitout Maouassa	(Spain) Granada	Loan return	30 June 2024	
MF	(Switzerland) Ardon Jashari	(Switzerland) Luzern	Undisclosed	1 July 2024	
DF	(Argentina) Zaid Romero	(Argentina) Estudiantes de La Plata	€5,500,000	1 July 2024	
MF	(Greece) Christos Tzolis	(Germany) Fortuna Düsseldorf	€6,600,000	4 July 2024	
FW	(Sweden) Gustaf Nilsson	(Belgium) Union Saint-Gilloise	€6,400,000	12 July 2024	
DF	(Belgium) Hugo Siquet	(Germany) SC Freiburg	€3,000,000	23 July 2024	
GK	(Netherlands) Dani van den Heuvel	(England) Leeds U21	Free	7 August 2024	

=== Out ===
Pos.	Player	Transferred to	Fee	Date	Source
GK	(England) Josef Bursik	(Scotland) Hibernian	Loan	1 July 2024	
MF	(Colombia) Éder Balanta	(Colombia) América de Cali	End of contract	1 July 2024	
FW	(Brazil) Igor Thiago	(England) Brentford	£31,000,000	1 July 2024	
MF	(Japan) Shion Homma	(Japan) Urawa Red Diamonds	Undisclosed	1 July 2024	
DF	(Ghana) Denis Odoi	(Belgium) Royal Antwerp	End of contract	1 July 2024	
MF	(Belgium) Cisse Sandra	(Netherlands) Willem II	Loan	4 July 2024	
GK	(Belgium) Nick Shinton	(Belgium) Beerschot	Undisclosed	23 July 2024	
FW	(Ukraine) Roman Yaremchuk	(Greece) Olympiacos	€2,000,000	30 July 2024	
MF	(Norway) Antonio Nusa	(Germany) RB Leipzig	Undisclosed	13 August 2024	
MF	(Denmark) Philip Zinckernagel	(Norway) Bodø/Glimt	Loan	17 August 2024	
FW	(Spain) Víctor Barberà	(Spain) Barcelona Atlètic	Undisclosed	27 August 2024	
DF	(France) Faitout Maouassa		Contract terminated	1 September 2024	
DF	(Belgium) Dedryck Boyata		Contract terminated	3 January 2025	
MF	(Denmark) Philip Zinckernagel	(United States) Chicago Fire FC	Free	6 January 2025	
MF	(Ghana) Kamal Sowah		Contract terminated	16 January 2025	
MF	(Denmark) Andreas Skov Olsen	(Germany) VfL Wolfsburg	€14,000,000	17 January 2025	

== Friendlies ==
=== Pre-season ===
29 June 2024 Friendly	Knokke (Belgium)	1–1	(Belgium) Club Brugge	Knokke-Heist
15:30	Cooman 76'	Report	Bisiwu 60'	Stadium: Stadion De Taeye

6 July 2024 Friendly	Club Brugge (Belgium)	4–1	(Greece) AEK Athens	Knokke-Heist
14:00	Ljubičić 13' (o.g.); Jutglà 29'; Et Taïbi 45'; Barberà 80'	Report	García 12'	Stadium: Complex Molenhoek
Note: A period of 45 minutes is followed by a period of 30 minutes and a final period of 45 minutes.

13 July 2024 Friendly	PSV (Netherlands)	1–1	(Belgium) Club Brugge	Eindhoven, Netherlands
13:00	Saibari 57'		Nielsen 48'
Note: Behind closed doors

17 July 2024 Friendly	Club Brugge (Belgium)	0–0	(Belgium) FCV Dender	Roeselare
11:00		Report		Stadium: Schiervelde Stadion
Note: Behind closed doors

17 July 2024 Friendly	Club Brugge (Belgium)	3–0	(England) Norwich City	Roeselare
18:30	Vanaken 4'; Nilsson 8'; Jutglà 58'			Stadium: Schiervelde Stadion

=== Mid-season ===
20 March 2025 Friendly	Club Brugge (Belgium)	2–1	(Netherlands) NAC Breda
12:00

== Competitions ==
=== Overall record ===
Competition	First match	Last match	Starting round	Final position	Record							
Competition	First match	Last match	Starting round	Final position	Pld	W	D	L	GF	GA	GD	Win %
Belgian Pro League regular season	26 July 2024	14–16 March 2025	Matchday 1		37	22	9	6	80	40	+40	59.46
Belgian Cup	30 October 2024		Seventh round		5	4	1	0	15	4	+11	80.00
Belgian Super Cup	20 July 2024		Final	Runners-up	1	0	0	1	1	2	−1	0.00
UEFA Champions League	18 September 2024		League phase		10	5	2	3	12	13	−1	50.00
Total					53	31	12	10	108	59	+49	58.49

Last updated: 21 January 2025
Source: Soccerway

=== Belgian Pro League ===
==== Regular season ====
Pos	Team	Pld	W	D	L	GF	GA	GD	Pts	Qualification or relegation
1	Genk	30	21	5	4	55	33	+22	68	Qualification for the Champions' Play-offs (Note: The regular season winner will qualify for the 2025–26 UEFA Europa League if not earning 2025–26 UEFA Champions League in the playoff.)
2	Club Brugge	30	17	8	5	65	36	+29	59	Qualification for the Champions' play-offs
3	Union SG	30	15	10	5	49	25	+24	55	Qualification for the Champions' play-offs
4	Anderlecht	30	15	6	9	50	27	+23	51	Qualification for the Champions' play-offs
5	Antwerp	30	12	10	8	47	32	+15	46	Qualification for the Champions' play-offs

Source: Jupiler Pro League (in Dutch), Soccerway
Rules for classification: 1) Points; 2) Matches won; 3) Goal difference; 4) Goals scored; 5) Away matches won; 6) Away goal difference; 7) Away goals scored; 8) Play-off.

==== Results summary ====
Overall								Home						Away					
Pld	W	D	L	GF	GA	GD	Pts	W	D	L	GF	GA	GD	W	D	L	GF	GA	GD
22	14	5	3	51	25	+26	47	8	2	1	31	13	+18	6	3	2	20	12	+8

Last updated: 18 January 2025.
Source: Worldfootball

==== Results by round ====
Round	1	2	3	4	5	6	7	8	9	10	11	12	13	14	15	16	17	18	19	20	21	22	23
Ground	H	A	A	H	A	H	A	H	A	H	A	H	A	A	H	H	A	H	A	H	A	H	H
Result	D	L	L	W	W	W	W	L	D	D	W	W	W	D	W	W	W	W	D	W	W	W	
Position	6	11	14	13	8	3	1	4	4	5	4	3	2	3	2	2	2	2	2	2	2	2	

Updated to match(es) played on 18 January 2025. Source: Worldfootball
A = Away; H = Home; W = Win; D = Draw; L = Loss

==== Matches ====
The match schedule was released on 11 June 2024.

26 July 2024 1	Club Brugge	1–1	Mechelen	Bruges
20:45 UTC+2	Seys 51'; Siquet (yellow card) 72'		Walsh (yellow card) 50'; Pflücke 65'; Konaté (yellow card) 82'	Stadium: Jan Breydel Stadium; Attendance: 21,813; Referee: Erik Lambrechts

4 August 2024 2	Standard Liège	1–0	Club Brugge	Liège
18:30 UTC+2	Bulat 64'		Mechele (yellow card) 72'; Jutglà (yellow card) 89'	Stadium: Stade Maurice Dufrasne; Attendance: 19,873; Referee: Lawrence Visser

11 August 2024 3	Genk	3–2	Club Brugge	Genk
13:30 UTC+2	Nkuba (yellow card) 38'; Steuckers 68' (pen.); Arokodare 83'; Hrošovský 90+4'; Kayembe (yellow card) 90+12'		Vetlesen (yellow card) 16'; Skov Olsen 45', 60'; Tzolis (yellow card) 74'	Stadium: Cegeka Arena; Attendance: 15,942; Referee: Nicolas Laforge

18 August 2024 4	Club Brugge	1–0	Antwerp	Bruges
13:30 UTC+2	Nilsson 81' (pen.)			Stadium: Jan Breydel Stadium; Attendance: 22,877; Referee: Lothar D'Hondt

25 August 2024 5	Dender	1–2	Club Brugge	Denderleeuw
13:30 UTC+2	Rodes 45+1'		Nilsson 8'; Tzolis 13'	Stadium: Van Roystadion; Attendance: 5,998; Referee: Erik Lambrechts

1 September 2024 6	Club Brugge	3–0	Cercle Brugge	Bruges
13:30 UTC+2	Mechele 39'; Tzolis 45+3'; Skov Olsen 55'			Stadium: Jan Breydel Stadium; Attendance: 24,400; Referee: Jasper Vergoote

14 September 2024 7	Kortrijk	0–3	Club Brugge	Kortrijk
18:15 UTC+2			Vanaken 13', 90+3'; Talbi 83'	Stadium: Guldensporen Stadion; Attendance: 8,014; Referee: Lothar D'Hondt

22 September 2024 8	Club Brugge	2–4	Gent	Bruges
13:30 UTC+2	Vetlesen (yellow card) 24'; Skov Olsen 48'; Nilsson (yellow card) 66', (goal) 70'; De Cuyper (yellow card) 85'		Ito (yellow card) 18'; Dean 40', (yellow card) 61'; Ordóñez 44' (o.g.); Gandelman 47', 64'; Delorge (yellow card) 85'; Samoise (yellow card) 85'; Araújo (yellow card) 90+4'	Stadium: Jan Breydel Stadium; Attendance: 23,502; Referee: Nicolas Laforge

27 September 2024 9	Charleroi	1–1	Club Brugge	Charleroi
20:45 UTC+2	Andreou (yellow card) 34'; Heymans (yellow card) 36'; Guiagon 48', (yellow card) 74'		Onyedika (red card) 55'; Vermant (yellow card) 76'; Vanaken 90+1'	Stadium: Stade du Pays de Charleroi; Attendance: 8,450; Referee: Nathan Verboomen

6 October 2024 10	Club Brugge	1–1	Union Saint-Gilloise	Bruges
18:30 UTC+2	Mechele 82'; Jashari (yellow card) 85'		Castro-Montes (yellow card) 32'; Fuseini (yellow card) 35'; Niang (yellow card) 48'; Ivanović 52', (yellow card) 58'; Mac Allister (yellow card) 83'; Amani (yellow card) 86'	Stadium: Jan Breydel Stadium; Attendance: 22,433; Referee: Erik Lambrechts

19 October 2024 11	Westerlo	1–2	Club Brugge	Westerlo
16:00 UTC+2	Sayyadmanesh 41' (pen.); Bayram (yellow card) 50' (yellow-red card) 90+1'		Spileers 4'; Vanaken 24'	Stadium: Het Kuipje; Attendance: 8,034; Referee: Nicolas Laforge

27 October 2024 12	Club Brugge	2–1	Anderlecht	Bruges
13:30 UTC+1	Vermant 8'; Talbi 76'		Leoni (yellow card) 45+2'; Dendoncker (yellow card) 54'; Dolberg (yellow card) 55'; Simić 88'	Stadium: Jan Breydel Stadium; Attendance: 25,978; Referee: Jasper Vergoote

2 November 2024 13	OH Leuven	0–1	Club Brugge	Leuven
18:15 UTC+1	Balikwisha (yellow card) 35'; Kuruçay (yellow card) 41'		Jashari (yellow card) 45'; Skov Olsen 58'; Mignolet (yellow card) 90'	Stadium: Den Dreef; Attendance: 7,895; Referee: Simon Bourdeaud'hui

10 November 2024 14	Beerschot	2–2	Club Brugge	Antwerp
19:15 UTC+1	Huiberts (yellow card) 34'; Al-Sahafi 53', 55'		Vermant 3'; Seys 14'; Ordóñez (yellow card) 16'; Tzolis (yellow card) 23'; Mechele (yellow card) 28'	Stadium: Olympisch Stadion; Attendance: 6,822; Referee: Bram Van Driessche

23 November 2024 15	Club Brugge	7–0	Sint-Truiden	Bruges
16:00 UTC+1	Tzolis 12', 22', 42' (pen.), 48'; Onyedika 51'; Jashari 57'; Vanaken 77'		Patris (yellow card) 25'; Delpupo (red card) 87'	Stadium: Jan Breydel Stadium; Attendance: 19,127; Referee: Jasper Vergoote

30 November 2024 16	Club Brugge	4–1	Dender	Bruges
18:15 UTC+1	Jutglà 24'; Skov Olsen 33'; Talbi 89', 90+1'		Květ 16'	Stadium: Jan Breydel Stadium; Attendance: 18,275; Referee: Bert Put

7 December 2024 17	Mechelen	1–2	Club Brugge	Mechelen
18:15 UTC+1	Raman 90+5'; Marsà (yellow card) 90+10'		De Cuyper 45+2' (pen.); Ordóñez 90+11'	Stadium: Achter de Kazerne; Attendance: 16,248; Referee: Bram Van Driessche

15 December 2024 18	Club Brugge	2–0	Genk	Bruges
13:30 UTC+1	Ordóñez (yellow card) 70'; Mechele 77'; Vanaken (yellow card) 81'; Skov Olsen 86', (yellow card) 90+3'		Sadick (yellow card) 39'; Arokodare (penalty missed) 73'	Stadium: Jan Breydel Stadium; Attendance: 24,325; Referee: Jasper Vergoote

22 December 2024 19	Union Saint-Gilloise	2–2	Club Brugge	Forest
18:30 UTC+1	Ivanović 45+3'; Nielsen 59' (o.g.)		Talbi 66'; Nilsson 78'	Stadium: Joseph Marien Stadium; Attendance: 7,235; Referee: Lawrence Visser

26 December 2024 20	Club Brugge	4–3	Westerlo	Bruges
16:00 UTC+1	Skov Olsen 5'; Tzolis 16'; Siquet 64', 90+4', (penalty missed) 90+4'		Yow 45+2'; Vušković 56'; Devine 71'	Stadium: Jan Breydel Stadium; Attendance: 22,234; Referee: Nathan Verboomen

12 January 2025 21	Anderlecht	0–3	Club Brugge	Anderlecht
18:30 UTC+1	Rits (yellow card) 71'		Jutglà 10', 41'; Nilsson 79'	Stadium: Lotto Park; Attendance: 18,502; Referee: Jasper Vergoote

18 January 2025 22	Club Brugge	4–2	Beerschot	Bruges
20:45 UTC+1	Nilsson 19', 90+5'; Vetlesen 22'; Vanaken 77'		Kosiah 80'; Weymans 90+2'	Stadium: Jan Breydel Stadium; Referee: Wim Smet

25 January 2025 23	Club Brugge	1–1	Kortrijk	Bruges
20:45 UTC+1				Stadium: Jan Breydel Stadium

8 February 2025 25	Club Brugge	1–0	OH Leuven

15 February 2025 26	Sint-Truiden	2–2	Club Brugge

23 February 2025 27	Club Brugge	1–2	Standard Liège

1 March 2025 28	Gent	1–1	Club Brugge

9 March 2025 29	Cercle Brugge	1–3	Club Brugge

16 March 2025 30	Club Brugge	4–2	Charleroi

==== Champions' play-offs ====
Pos	Team	Pld	W	D	L	GF	GA	GD	Pts	Qualification or relegation
1	Union SG (C)	10	9	1	0	22	3	+19	56	Qualification for the Champions League league phase
2	Club Brugge	10	7	2	1	21	6	+15	53	Qualification for the Champions League third qualifying round
3	Genk	10	4	1	5	14	11	+3	47	Qualification for the Europa League play-off round (Note: Club Brugge won the 2024–25 Belgian Cup and qualified for the Champions League through finishing second, the Europa League play-off round berth was therefore transferred to regular season winners Genk.)
4	Anderlecht	10	3	1	6	12	13	−1	36	Qualification for the Europa League second qualifying round

Source: Jupiler Pro League (in Dutch), Soccerway
Rules for classification: 1) Points; 2) Points without (possible) half points added due to rounding; 3) Regular season finishing position.
(C) Champions
Notes:

30 March 2025 1	Club Brugge	2–0	Anderlecht	Bruges
13:30				Stadium: Jan Breydel Stadium; Referee: Jasper Vergoote

6 April 2025 2	Antwerp	v	Club Brugge	Antwerp
13:30

=== Belgian Cup ===
30 October 2024 Seventh round	Club Brugge	6–1	Belisia Bilzen	Bruges
20:30 UTC+1	Jutglà 15', 17'; Romero 25'; Nilsson 64'; Meijer 68'; Skóraś 87'		Valcke 36'	Stadium: Jan Breydel Stadium; Referee: Hannes De Couvreur

3 December 2024 Round of 16	Patro Eisden	1–3	Club Brugge	Maasmechelen
20:45 UTC+1	Van Eenoo 31'		Nielsen 13'; Vanaken 48'; Jashari 81'	Stadium: Patro-Stadion; Referee: Lothar D'hondt

7 January 2025 Quarter-finals	Club Brugge	3–0	OH Leuven	Bruges
20:45 UTC+1	Tzolis 23', 69'; Sabbe (yellow card) 35'; Spileers (yellow card) 74'; Skóraś 86' (pen.)		Mitrović (yellow card) 42'; Kuruçay (yellow card) 85'	Stadium: Jan Breydel Stadium; Referee: Lothar D'hondt

15 January 2025 Semi-finals; First leg	Club Brugge	2–1	Genk	Bruges
20:45 UTC+1	Ordóñez 34'; Tzolis 74' (pen.); Vanaken (yellow card) 82'; De Cuyper (yellow card) 90+1'; Vermant (yellow card) 90+2'		Arokodare 28'; Sadick (yellow card) 30'; Bonsu Baah (yellow card) 35'; Sory Bangoura (yellow card) 40'	Stadium: Jan Breydel Stadium; Referee: Lawrence Visser

5 February 2025 Semi-finals; Second leg	Genk	1-1 (2–3 agg.)	Club Brugge	Genk
20:45 UTC+1				Stadium: Cegeka Arena

Final	Anderlecht	1-2	Club Brugge	Genk
				Stadium: King Baudouin Stadium

=== Belgian Super Cup ===
20 July 2024 Final	Club Brugge	1–2	Union Saint-Gilloise	Bruges
20:00	Romero (yellow card) 11'; Tzolis 79'		Leysen (yellow card) 13', (goal) 47'; Puertas 40' (pen.); Vanhoutte (yellow card) 42'; Sadiki (yellow card) 49'; Moris (yellow card) 50'; Kabangu (yellow card) 58'; Terho (yellow card) 90'	Stadium: Jan Breydel Stadium; Attendance: 18,000; Referee: Bram Van Driessche

=== UEFA Champions League ===
==== League phase ====
Pos	Team	Pld	W	D	L	GF	GA	GD	Pts	Qualification
22	(The Football Association) Manchester City	8	3	2	3	18	14	+4	11	Advance to knockout phase play-offs (unseeded)
23	(Portuguese Football Federation) Sporting CP	8	3	2	3	13	12	+1	11	Advance to knockout phase play-offs (unseeded)
24	(Royal Belgian Football Association) Club Brugge	8	3	2	3	7	11	−4	11	Advance to knockout phase play-offs (unseeded)
25	(Croatian Football Federation) Dinamo Zagreb	8	3	2	3	12	19	−7	11	
26	(German Football Association) VfB Stuttgart	8	3	1	4	13	17	−4	10	

Source: UEFA
Rules for classification: League phase tiebreakers

Round	1	2	3	4	5	6	7	8
Ground	H	A	A	H	A	H	H	A
Result	L	W	L	W	D	W	D	L
Position	31	21	26	22	23	19	20	24

Updated to match(es) played on 29 January 2025. Source: UEFA
A = Away; H = Home; W = Win; D = Draw; L = Loss

18 September 2024 1	Club Brugge (Belgium)	0–3	(Germany) Borussia Dortmund	Bruges, Belgium
21:00 UTC+2	Vetlesen (yellow card) 53'	Report	Bynoe-Gittens 76', 86'; Ryerson (yellow card) 84'; Guirassy 90+5' (pen.)	Stadium: Jan Breydel Stadium; Attendance: 19,961; Referee: Irfan Peljto (Bosnia and Herzegovina)

2 October 2024 2	Sturm Graz (Austria)	0–1	(Belgium) Club Brugge	Klagenfurt, Austria
21:00 UTC+2	Aiwu (yellow card) 51'; Geyrhofer (yellow card) 66'; Yalcouyé (yellow card) 70'; Chukwuani (yellow card) 70'; Gazibegović (yellow card) 90+4'	Report	Tzolis 23'; Skóraś (yellow card) 73'	Stadium: Wörthersee Stadion; Attendance: 23,205; Referee: Aliyar Aghayev (Azerbaijan)

22 October 2024 3	Milan (Italy)	3–1	(Belgium) Club Brugge	Milan, Italy
18:45 UTC+2	Pulisic 34'; Leão (yellow card) 50'; Morata (yellow card) 59'; Reijnders 61', 71'; Gabbia (yellow card) 71'; Camarda (yellow card) 88'	Report	Seys (yellow card) 20'; Jashari (yellow card) 23'; Onyedika (red card) 40'; Sabbe 51'; Skóraś (yellow card) 73'	Stadium: San Siro; Attendance: 58,649; Referee: Felix Zwayer (Germany)

6 November 2024 4	Club Brugge (Belgium)	1–0	(England) Aston Villa	Bruges, Belgium
18:45 UTC+1	Nielsen (yellow card) 17'; Vanaken 52' (pen.); Vetlesen (yellow card) 78'	Report	Mings (yellow card) 25'; Carlos (yellow card) 25'; Kamara (yellow card) 90+1'; Konsa (yellow card) 90+5'	Stadium: Jan Breydel Stadium; Attendance: 23,466; Referee: Tobias Stieler (Germany)

27 November 2024 5	Celtic (Scotland)	1–1	(Belgium) Club Brugge	Glasgow, Scotland
20:00 UTC+0	Maeda 60'; Bernardo (yellow card) 84'	Report	Carter-Vickers 26' (o.g.); Ordóñez (yellow card) 48'; Mechele (yellow card) 76'; Seys (yellow card) 90+2'	Stadium: Celtic Park; Attendance: 57,456; Referee: Georgi Kabakov (Bulgaria)

10 December 2024 6	Club Brugge (Belgium)	2–1	(Portugal) Sporting CP	Bruges, Belgium
21:00 UTC+1	Quaresma 24' (o.g.); Skov Olsen (yellow card) 26'; Tzolis (yellow card) 43'; Onyedika (yellow card) 45+4'; Mignolet (yellow card) 52'; Nielsen 83'	Report	Catamo 3'; Gyökeres (yellow card) 34'; St. Juste (yellow card) 50'; Araújo (yellow card) 78'; Hjulmand (yellow card) 83'	Stadium: Jan Breydel Stadium; Attendance: 22,254; Referee: Anthony Taylor (England)

21 January 2025 7	Club Brugge (Belgium)	0–0	(Italy) Juventus	Bruges, Belgium
21:00 UTC+1		Report		Stadium: Jan Breydel Stadium; Referee: Benoît Bastien (France)

29 January 2025 8	Manchester City (England)	3–1	(Belgium) Club Brugge	Manchester, England
20:00 UTC+0	Kovačić 53'; Ordóñez 62' (o.g.); Savinho 77'	Report	Onyedika 45'	Stadium: City of Manchester Stadium; Referee: José María Sánchez Martínez (Spain)

==== Knockout phase play-offs ====
The draw for the knockout phase play-offs was held on 31 January 2025.

12 February 2025 First leg	Club Brugge (Belgium)	2–1	(Italy) Atalanta	Bruges, Belgium
18:45 CET (UTC+1)	Jutglà 15'; Nilsson 90+4' (pen.)	Report	Pašalić 41'; Tolói (yellow card) 90+1'; Cuadrado (yellow card) 90+2'; Hien (yellow card) 90+2'	Stadium: Jan Breydel Stadium; Attendance: 24,242; Referee: Halil Umut Meler (Turkey)

18 February 2025 Second leg	Atalanta (Italy)	1–3 (2–5 agg.)	(Belgium) Club Brugge	Bergamo, Italy
21:00 CET (UTC+1)	Kolašinac (yellow card) 11'; Lookman 46', (penalty missed) 61'; Djimsiti (yellow card) 80'; Tolói (red card) 87'; de Roon (yellow card) 87'	Report	Talbi 3', 27'; Onyedika (yellow card) 36'; Jutglà 45+3'; Tzolis (yellow card) 60'; De Cuyper (yellow card) 87'; Nilsson (yellow card) 87'	Stadium: Stadio Atleti Azzurri d'Italia; Referee: Felix Zwayer (Germany)

===== Round of 16 =====
The draw for the round of 16 will be held on 21 February 2025.

4 March 2025 First leg	Club Brugge (Belgium)	1–3	(England) Aston Villa	Bruges, Belgium
18:45 CET (UTC+1)	De Cuyper 12'	Report	Bailey 3'; Mechele 82' (o.g.); Asensio 88' (pen.)	Stadium: Jan Breydel Stadium; Attendance: 26,890; Referee: João Pinheiro (Portugal)

12 March 2025 Second leg	Aston Villa (England)	3–0 (6–1 agg.)	(Belgium) Club Brugge	Birmingham, England
20:00 GMT (UTC+0)	Asensio 50', 61'; Maatsen 57'	Report	Sabbe (red card) 16'; Vanaken (yellow card) 69'	Stadium: Villa Park; Referee: Daniel Siebert (Germany)

== Statistics ==
=== Squad appearances and goals ===
Last updated on 18 February 2025

No.	Pos	Nat	Player	Total		Pro League		Belgian Cup		Belgian Super Cup		UEFA Champions League	
No.	Pos	Nat	Player	Apps	Goals	Apps	Goals	Apps	Goals	Apps	Goals	Apps	Goals
Goalkeepers
22	GK	(Belgium) BEL	Simon Mignolet	37	0	26	0	0	0	1	0	10	0
33	GK	(Netherlands) NED	Dani van den Heuvel	0	0	0	0	0	0	0	0	0	0
29	GK	(Belgium) BEL	Nordin Jackers	0	0	0	0	0	0	0	0	0	0
Defenders
2	DF	(Argentina) ARG	Zaid Romero	4	0	2+1	0	0	0	1	0	0	0
4	DF	(Ecuador) ECU	Joel Ordóñez	7	1	5	1	0	0	0	0	2	0
14	DF	(Netherlands) NED	Bjorn Meijer	0	0	0	0	0	0	0	0	0	0
41	DF	(Belgium) BEL	Hugo Siquet	6	0	2+4	0	0	0	0	0	0	0
44	DF	(Belgium) BEL	Brandon Mechele	7	1	6	1	0	0	1	0	0	0
55	DF	(Belgium) BEL	Maxim De Cuyper	7	1	5+1	1	0	0	0	0	1	0
58	DF	(Belgium) BEL	Jorne Spileers	1	0	0	0	0	0	0+1	0	0	0
64	DF	(Belgium) BEL	Kyriani Sabbe	0	0	0	0	0	0	0	0	0	0
65	DF	(Belgium) BEL	Joaquin Seys	7	1	5+1	1	0	0	1	0	0	0
66	DF	(Ivory Coast) CIV	Bi Abdoul Kader Yameogo	0	0	0	0	0	0	0	0	0	0
67	DF	(Morocco) MAR	Amine Et-Taïbi	1	0	0	0	0	0	1	0	0	0
Midfielders
10	FW	(Norway) NOR	Hugo Vetlesen	7	1	5+1	1	0	0	1	0	0	0
15	MF	(Nigeria) NGR	Raphael Onyedika	6	1	5	1	0	0	0+1	0	0	0
20	MF	(Belgium) BEL	Hans Vanaken	11	9	9	8	0	0	1	0	1	1
27	MF	(Denmark) DEN	Casper Nielsen	3	0	1+1	0	0	0	1	0	0	0
30	MF	(Switzerland) SUI	Ardon Jashari	3	1	1+2	1	0	0	0	0	0	0
Forwards
8	FW	(Greece) GRE	Christos Tzolis	13	10	10+1	8	0	0	1	1	1	1
9	FW	(Spain) ESP	Ferran Jutglà	11	6	2+6	4	0	0	1	0	2	2
17	FW	(Belgium) BEL	Romeo Vermant	5	2	1+3	2	0	0	0+1	0	0	0
19	FW	(Sweden) SWE	Gustaf Nilsson	7	2	6	2	0	0	0+1	0	0	0
21	FW	(Poland) POL	Michał Skóraś	5	0	1+4	0	0	0	0	0	0	0
68	FW	(Belgium) BEL	Chemsdine Talbi	11	6	0+1	4	0	0	0+1	0	9	2
Players who have made an appearance this season but have left the club
32	MF	(Norway) NOR	Antonio Nusa	4	0	2+1	0	0	0	1	0	0	0
28	DF	(Belgium) BEL	Dedryck Boyata	0	0	0	0	0	0	0	0	0	0
7	FW	(Denmark) DEN	Andreas Skov Olsen	6	3	4+2	3	0	0	0	0	0	0

=== Goalscorers ===
As of match played 18 January 2025

Rank	Pos.	No.	Nat.	Player	Pro League	Play-offs	Belgian Cup	Super Cup	Champions League	Total
1	MF	8	(Greece)	Christos Tzolis	16	0	3	1	1	21
2	FW	9	(Spain)	Ferran Jutglà	10	0	2	0	2	14
3	MF	20	(Belgium)	Hans Vanaken	10	0	1	0	1	12
4	FW	19	(Sweden)	Gustaf Nilsson	9	0	1	0	1	11
5	FW	17	(Belgium)	Romeo Vermant	8	0	2	0	0	10
6	FW	7	(Denmark)	Andreas Skov Olsen	8	0	0	0	0	8
7	MF	68	(Belgium)	Chemsdine Talbi	5	0	0	0	2	7
8	MF	30	(Switzerland)	Ardon Jashari	3	0	1	0	0	4
8	DF	55	(Belgium)	Maxim De Cuyper	3	0	0	0	1	4
10	DF	44	(Belgium)	Brandon Mechele	3	0	0	0	0	3
11	DF	4	(Ecuador)	Joel Ordóñez	1	0	1	0	0	2
11	FW	10	(Norway)	Hugo Vetlesen	2	0	0	0	0	2
11	MF	15	(Nigeria)	Raphael Onyedika	1	0	0	0	1	2
11	FW	21	(Poland)	Michał Skóraś	0	0	2	0	0	2
11	MF	27	(Norway)	Casper Nielsen	0	0	1	0	1	2
11	DF	65	(Belgium)	Joaquin Seys	2	0	0	0	0	2
Own goals					0	0	0	0	2	2
Totals					81	0	13	1	12	108
