= 2022–23 Challenger Pro League =

Challenger Pro League
- Season: 2022–23
- Champions: RWD Molenbeek
- Promoted: RWD Molenbeek
- Relegated: Virton

The 2022–23 season of the Challenger Pro League began in August 2022 and ended in May 2023. It was the first season under its new name after being renamed from First Division B.

== Team changes ==
=== In ===
- Dender EH were promoted as champions of the 2021–22 Belgian National Division 1.
- Beerschot were relegated from the 2021–22 Belgian First Division A.
- RSCA Futures, Club NXT, Jong Genk and SL16 FC were added to the league as the league was expanded with four U23 teams and they finished as the top four teams in the 2021–22 Belgian U23 league.

=== Out ===
- Westerlo were promoted from the 2021–22 Belgian First Division B as champions.
- Royal Excel Mouscron folded as a team and ceased to exist.

=== Name change ===
- Waasland-Beveren found an agreement with the owners of the rights to the former club K.S.K. Beveren, which allowed it to change its name to S.K. Beveren.

== Format changes ==
Four U23 teams were added to the league as part of a two-season trial, expanding the league from 8 to 12 teams. These twelve teams will play each other twice in a regular competition, after which the league is split, with the top and bottom six teams playing separate competitions from that point, continuing with the points gained. At the top end, only the champion is promoted as three teams are relegated from the 2022–23 Belgian First Division A to reduce the size back from 18 to 16 teams. At the bottom end, the team finishing last will be relegated. U23 teams cannot be promoted to the Belgian First Division A, but can suffer relegation, furthermore they always have to play at least one level below their A team counterparts, hence could be relegated despite not finishing last.

== Team information ==
=== Stadiums and locations ===
Locations of the 2022–23 Challenger Pro League teams

Matricule	Club	City	First season of current spell at second level	Coming from	2021-22 result	Stadium	Capacity
35	RSCA Futures	Anderlecht, Brussels	2022–23	U23 competition	2nd U23 competition	King Baudouin Stadium	38,000
13	K Beerschot VA	Antwerp	2022–23	Belgian First Division A	18th (D1A)	Olympic Stadium	12,771
4068	S.K. Beveren	Beveren	2021–22	Belgian First Division B	3rd (D1B)	Freethiel Stadion	8,190
3	Club NXT	Bruges (Note: Club NXT did not play its home matches at the same venue as the A-squad of Club Brugge (the Jan Breydel Stadium) but rather they moved to Roeselare to play in the Schiervelde Stadion.)	2022–23	U23 competition	3rd U23 competition	Schiervelde Stadion	8,340
818	K.M.S.K. Deinze	Deinze	2020–21	Belgian First Amateur Division	4th (D1B)	Burgemeester Van de Wiele Stadion	7,515
3900	F.C.V. Dender E.H.	Denderleeuw	2022–23	Belgian National Division 1	1st (NatD1)	Van Roystadion	6,429
322	Jong Genk	Genk	2022–23	U23 competition	1st U23 competition	Luminus Arena	24,956
3970	Lierse Kempenzonen	Lier	2020–21	Belgian First Amateur Division	5th (D1B)	Herman Vanderpoortenstadion	14,538
2554	Lommel SK	Lommel	2018–19	Belgian First Amateur Division	6th (D1B)	Soevereinstadion	8,000
5479	RWD Molenbeek	Molenbeek, Brussels	2020–21	Belgian First Amateur Division	2nd (D1B)	Edmond Machtens Stadium	12,266
16	SL16 FC	Liège	2022–23	U23 competition	4th U23 competition	Stade Maurice Dufrasne	30,023
200	R.E. Virton	Virton	2021–22	Belgian Division 2	8th (D1B)	Stade Yvan Georges	4,015

=== Personnel and kits ===
Club	Manager	Kit Manufacturer	Sponsors
Beerschot	(Austria) Andreas Wieland	Erreà	Yelo
Beveren	(Belgium) Wim De Decker	Uhlsport	Star Casino
Club NXT	(Belgium) Hayk Milkon (Note: Nicky Hayen was the manager for the regular season and the first three matchdays of the promotion play-off.)	Macron	Alheembouw
Deinze	(Belgium) Marc Grosjean (Note: Takahisa Shiraishi was the manager for matchdays 1 through 6, Antonio Calderón was caretaker manager from matchday 7 to 9.)	Jako	PlaysiaTV
Dender EH	(Belgium) Regi Van Acker	Nike	Drankendiscount Stravbier
Jong Genk	(Belgium) Hans Somers	Nike	Beobank
Lierse Kempenzonen	(Belgium) Tom Van Imschoot	Jako	Keukens Van Lommel
Lommel	(England) Steve Bould	Masita	Bingoal
RSCA Futures	(Belgium) Guillaume Gillet (Note: Robin Veldman was the manager for matchdays 1 through 10.)	Joma	DVV Insurance (home); Candriam (away)
RWD Molenbeek	(Belgium) Vincent Euvrard	Joma	Facebank
SL16 FC	(Germany) Joseph Laumann	Adidas	VOO
Virton	(Belgium) José Jeunechamps (Note: Christian Bracconi was the manager for matchdays 1 through 16.)	Kipsta	Leopard Natural

=== Managerial changes ===
Team	Outgoing manager	Manner of departure	Date of vacancy	Position	Replaced by	Date of appointment
Deinze	(Belgium) Wim De Decker	Mutual consent	End of 2021–22 season	Pre-season	(Japan) Takahisa Shiraishi	19 May 2022
Beerschot	(Belgium) Greg Vanderidt	Replaced	End of 2021–22 season	Pre-season	(Austria) Andreas Wieland	23 May 2022
Lommel	(England) Brian Eastick	End of contract	End of 2021–22 season	Pre-season	(England) Steve Bould	3 June 2022
Beveren	(Spain) Jordi Condom	End of contract	End of 2021–22 season	Pre-season	(Belgium) Wim De Decker	5 June 2022
Club NXT	(Belgium) Rik De Mil	Promoted to Club Brugge as assistant	End of 2021–22 season	Pre-season	(Belgium) Nicky Hayen	15 June 2022
Virton	(Uruguay) Pablo Correa	End of contract	End of 2021–22 season	Pre-season	(France) Christian Bracconi	9 July 2022
SL16 FC	(Belgium) Geoffrey Valenne	Replaced	End of 2021–22 season	Pre-season	(Germany) Joseph Laumann	11 July 2022
Deinze	(Japan) Takahisa Shiraishi	Resigned	29 September 2022	12th	(Spain) Antonio Calderón (caretaker)	30 September 2022
Deinze	(Spain) Antonio Calderón (caretaker)	Caretaker replaced	24 October 2022	12th	(Belgium) Marc Grosjean	24 October 2022
RSCA Futures	(Netherlands) Robin Veldman	Promoted to Anderlecht as caretaker	24 October 2022	5th	(Belgium) Guillaume Gillet	24 October 2022
Dender EH	(Belgium) Regi Van Acker	Sacked	7 February 2023	9th	(Belgium) Pieter De Bot (caretaker)	7 February 2023
Virton	(France) Christian Bracconi	Sacked	7 February 2023	12th	(Belgium) José Jeunechamps	7 February 2023
Dender EH	(Belgium) Pieter De Bot	Caretaker replaced	13 February 2023	10th	(Belgium) Timmy Simons	13 February 2023
Club NXT	(Belgium) Nicky Hayen	Promoted to Club Brugge as assistant	15 March 2023	4th	(Belgium) Hayk Milkon	15 March 2023

== League table ==
Pos	Team	Pld	W	D	L	GF	GA	GD	Pts	Qualification
1	RWD Molenbeek (C, P)	32	21	6	5	65	29	+36	69	Promoted to Pro League
2	Beveren	32	20	8	4	75	33	+42	68	
3	Beerschot	32	15	4	13	43	41	+2	49	
4	Club NXT (Note: ineligible for promotion.)	32	14	7	11	51	48	+3	49	
5	Lierse Kempenzonen	32	14	4	14	53	59	−6	46	
6	RSCA Futures	32	9	10	13	45	55	−10	37	
7	Lommel	32	16	3	13	53	46	+7	51	
8	Deinze	32	15	4	13	49	47	+2	49	
9	Dender EH	32	11	6	15	41	47	−6	39	
10	SL16 FC	32	5	12	15	31	60	−29	27	
11	Jong Genk	32	6	8	18	35	57	−22	26	
12	Virton (R)	32	5	10	17	32	51	−19	25	Relegated to National Division 1

Source: Challenger Pro League
Rules for classification: 1) Points; 2) Matches won; 3) Goal difference; 4) Goals scored; 5) Away goals scored; 6) Away matches won; 7) Play-off.
(C) Champions; (P) Promoted; (R) Relegated

=== Positions by round ===
The table lists the positions of teams after the completion of each matchday, even if due to postponed matches this means the teams have an unequal number of games played. Coloured cells for matchdays 1 through 22 refer to being in the promotion play-offs (green) or relegation play-offs (red), after that only the 1st and last position are highlighted as these mean promotion and relegation respectively.

Team ╲ Round	1	2	3	4	5	6	7	8	9	10	11	12	13	14	15	16	17	18	19	20	21	22	23	24	25	26	27	28	29	30	31	32
RWD Molenbeek	6	4	7	7	4	7	6	6	4	3	2	2	2	2	3	3	3	3	2	1	1	1	1	1	1	1	1	1	1	1	1	1
Beveren	10	10	11	6	3	5	5	3	1	2	1	1	1	1	2	2	2	2	1	2	2	2	2	2	2	2	2	2	2	2	2	2
Beerschot	3	2	6	2	5	2	1	4	5	4	5	5	3	3	1	1	1	1	3	3	3	3	3	3	3	4	4	4	4	3	3	3
Club NXT	5	11	8	10	9	9	10	7	6	6	6	6	6	9	8	7	6	6	6	7	4	5	4	4	4	3	3	3	3	4	4	4
Lierse Kempenzonen	11	7	2	1	1	1	4	2	2	1	3	3	5	5	4	4	4	5	5	5	5	4	5	5	5	5	5	5	5	5	5	5
RSCA Futures	9	1	3	4	6	3	2	1	3	5	4	4	4	4	5	5	7	7	7	6	7	6	6	6	6	6	6	6	6	6	6	6
Lommel	1	6	1	3	2	4	3	5	7	7	7	7	7	6	6	6	5	4	4	4	6	7	7	7	7	7	7	7	7	7	7	7
Deinze	8	3	5	8	10	11	12	9	11	12	10	8	9	8	7	8	8	8	8	8	8	8	8	8	8	8	8	8	8	8	8	8
Dender EH	12	12	12	12	12	12	9	11	12	9	8	9	8	7	9	9	9	9	9	9	9	10	10	11	9	9	9	9	9	9	9	9
SL16 FC	4	8	4	5	8	6	7	8	8	8	9	10	10	10	10	10	10	10	10	10	10	11	11	10	11	11	11	11	11	11	10	10
Jong Genk	2	5	9	9	11	10	11	12	10	11	12	12	11	11	11	11	11	11	12	11	11	9	9	9	10	10	10	10	10	10	11	11
Virton	7	9	10	11	7	8	8	10	9	10	11	11	12	12	12	12	12	12	11	12	12	12	12	12	12	12	12	12	12	12	12	12

Source: worldfootball.net

=== Results ===
==== Matches 1–22 ====
Home \ Away	RWD	BEV	BEE	LIE	NXT	AND	LOM	DEI	GNK	DEN	STA	VIR
RWD Molenbeek		3–1	2–0	3–0	0–2	2–2	5–0	2–1	1–1	1–0	3–1	3–1
Beveren	1–1		2–0	5–0	1–0	4–1	2–3	2–1	3–0	5–2	2–1	2–2
Beerschot	0–1	1–0		2–3	1–0	1–2	0–2	2–0	3–2	1–1	1–0	3–0
Lierse Kempenzonen	1–2	1–5	1–0		3–1	2–3	3–1	4–1	4–2	2–1	2–0	2–2
Club NXT	2–1	2–2	1–2	1–0		2–2	2–1	2–0	3–1	4–1	2–2	1–0
RSCA Futures	1–2	2–2	1–2	3–3	1–1		2–2	0–0	2–0	0–2	3–0	3–1
Lommel	2–1	0–2	1–3	0–2	3–4	0–2		1–0	2–1	1–1	0–1	3–1
Deinze	1–2	1–4	3–2	2–1	2–1	2–3	3–0		3–2	0–2	4–1	1–1
Jong Genk	2–0	2–2	1–2	4–1	1–2	3–2	0–3	0–0		0–2	2–2	0–1
Dender EH	0–1	0–3	2–3	2–3	3–2	2–1	1–4	0–1	0–1		0–1	3–4
SL16 FC	1–4	2–2	2–2	2–4	0–0	1–3	0–3	1–2	2–2	1–1		2–1
Virton	1–1	0–0	1–2	0–0	3–3	1–3	0–1	0–1	0–1	1–1	0–2	

Source: Flashscore
Legend: Blue = home team win; Yellow = draw; Red = away team win.

==== Top six ====
Home \ Away	RWD	BEV	BEE	NXT	LIE	AND
RWD Molenbeek		1–1	4–0	3–2	3–1	1–0
Beveren	2–1		3–0	4–1	2–0	4–1
Beerschot	1–1	0–1		4–0	1–2	0–0
Club NXT	1–3	3–0	2–1		0–1	0–0
Lierse Kempenzonen	0–3	2–3	0–1	1–2		2–0
RSCA Futures	0–4	0–4	0–2	1–2	2–2	

Source: Flashscore
Legend: Blue = home team win; Yellow = draw; Red = away team win.

==== Bottom six ====
Home \ Away	LOM	DEI	DEN	STA	GNK	VIR
Lommel		4–1	1–0	6–1	2–0	1–2
Deinze	1–1		3–2	5–0	1–3	3–1
Dender EH	2–1	1–0		0–0	1–0	2–1
SL16 FC	1–0	1–2	1–1		0–0	1–1
Jong Genk	2–3	0–2	0–4	1–1		1–1
Virton	0–1	1–2	0–1	1–0	3–1	

Source: Flashscore
Legend: Blue = home team win; Yellow = draw; Red = away team win.

== Season statistics ==
=== Top scorers ===
As of end of season

Rank	Player	Club	Goals
1	(France) Thierno Barry	Beveren	20
2	(Martinique) Mickaël Biron	RWD Molenbeek	16
3	(Belgium) Lucas Stassin	RSCA Futures	15
4	(Democratic Republic of the Congo) Dieumerci Mbokani	Beveren	14
5	(Belgium) Thibo Baeten	Beerschot	13
5	(Brazil) Lucas Ribeiro Costa	Beveren	13
5	(Belgium) Thibaut Van Acker	Lierse Kempenzonen	13
8	(Portugal) Leandro Rocha	Lierse Kempenzonen	12
9	(Brazil) Cauê	Lommel	9
9	(Belgium) Romeo Vermant	Club NXT	9

8 goals (4 players)
- (France) Kévin Hoggas (Beveren)
- (Belgium) Lennart Mertens (Deinze) (includes 5 goals for Club NXT)
- (Costa Rica) Alonso Martínez (Lommel)
- (Mauritania) Souleymane Anne (Virton)
7 goals (3 players)
- (Iceland) Nökkvi Þórisson (Beerschot)
- (Belgium) Mika Godts (Jong Genk)
- (Belgium) Zakaria El Ouahdi (RWD Molenbeek)
6 goals (12 players)
- (Guinea) Bafodé Dansoko (Deinze)
- (Belgium) Dylan De Belder (Deinze)
- (Belgium) Alessio Staelens (Deinze)
- (Belgium) Jellert Van Landschoot (Deinze)
- (Nigeria) Victory Beniangba (Jong Genk)
- (Belgium) Guillaume De Schryver (Lierse Kempenzonen)
- (Cameroon) Serge Tabekou (Lierse Kempenzonen)
- (Argentina) Agustin Anello (Lommel)
- (Algeria) Rafik Belghali (Lommel)
- (Belgium) Youssef Challouk (RWD Molenbeek)
- (Belgium) Kylian Hazard (RWD Molenbeek)
- (Belgium) Ilyes Ziani (SL16 FC)
5 goals (8 players)
- (Belgium) Thibaud Verlinden (Beerschot)
- (Belgium) Cisse Sandra (Club NXT)
- (Belgium) Chemsdine Talbi (Club NXT)
- (Turkey) Tiago Cukur (Dender EH)
- (Belgium) Stefano Marzo (Dender EH)
- (Slovenia) Nicolas Rajsel (Dender EH)
- (Belgium) Jay-Dee Geusens (Jong Genk)
- (Madagascar) Hakim Abdallah (Virton)
4 goals (12 players)
- (Belgium) Ryan Sanusi (Beerschot)
- (Belgium) Sander Coopman (Beveren)
- (Japan) Shion Homma (Club NXT)
- (Belgium) Gaëtan Hendrickx (Deinze)
- (Belgium) Zakaria Atteri (Dender EH)
- (Belgium) Michaël Lallemand (Dender EH)
- (Belgium) Ridwane M'Barki (Dender EH)
- (Belgium) Sekou Diawara (Jong Genk)
- (Brazil) Metinho (Lommel)
- (Belgium) Enock Agyei (RSCA Futures)
- (France) Ivann Botella (RWD Molenbeek)
- (Brazil) Luís Oyama (RWD Molenbeek)
3 goals (25 players)
- (Slovakia) David Hrnčár (Beveren)
- (Austria) Daniel Maderner (Beveren)
- (Belgium) Bruny Nsimba (Beveren)
- (Belgium) Lenn De Smet (Club NXT)
- (Belgium) Noah Mbamba (Club NXT)
- (Venezuela) Daniel Pérez (Club NXT)
- (Venezuela) Teo Quintero (Deinze)
- (Belgium) Lennard Hens (Dender EH)
- (Switzerland) Bastien Toma (Jong Genk)
- (Belgium) Nils Schouterden (Lierse Kempenzonen)
- (Belgium) Daan Vekemans (Lierse Kempenzonen)
- (Sweden) Amar Fatah (Lommel)
- (Finland) Juho Talvitie (Lommel)
- (Cameroon) Simion Michez (RSCA Futures)
- (Belgium) Killian Sardella (RSCA Futures)
- (France) Florian Le Joncour (RWD Molenbeek)
- (Republic of Ireland) Jake O'Brien (RWD Molenbeek)
- (Kazakhstan) Yan Vorogovsky (RWD Molenbeek)
- (Belgium) Anisse Brrou (SL16 FC)
- (Poland) Aleksander Buksa (SL16 FC)
- (Belgium) Brahim Ghalidi (SL16 FC)
- (Belgium) Léandre Kuavita (SL16 FC)
- (Benin) Yannick Aguemon (Virton)
- (Republic of the Congo) Yann Mabella (Virton)
- (Belgium) Ilombe Mboyo (Virton)
2 goals (41 players)
- (Liberia) Ayouba Kosiah (Beerschot)
- (Belgium) Hervé Matthys (Beerschot)
- (Belgium) Dante Rigo (Beerschot)
- (Belgium) Jan Van den Bergh (Beerschot)
- (Brazil) Everton Luiz (Beveren)
- (Belgium) Joachim Van Damme (Beveren)
- (Serbia) Aleksandar Vukotić (Beveren)
- (Belgium) Arne Engels (Club NXT)
- (Belgium) Ibe Hautekiet (Club NXT)
- (Belgium) Kyriani Sabbe (Club NXT)
- (Belgium) Mathis Servais (Club NXT)
- (Belgium) Joachim Carcela (Deinze)
- (Belgium) Ayman Kassimi (Deinze)
- (Ivory Coast) Mamadou Koné (Deinze)
- (Belgium) Jur Schryvers (Deinze)
- (Belgium) Kjetil Borry (Dender EH)
- (Belgium) Kobe Cools (Dender EH)
- (Belgium) Olivier Myny (Dender EH)
- (Belgium) Dario Cutillas Carpe (Jong Genk)
- (Belgium) Matisse Didden (Jong Genk)
- (Belgium) Jamie Yayi Mpie (Jong Genk)
- (Belgium) Joedrick Pupe (Lierse Kempenzonen)
- (Belgium) Toon Raemaekers (Lierse Kempenzonen)
- (Nigeria) Jordan Attah Kadiri (Lommel)
- (Iceland) Kolbeinn Þórðarson (Lommel)
- (Nigeria) Ishaq Abdulrazak (RSCA Futures)
- (Belgium) Anouar Ait El Hadj (RSCA Futures)
- (Ecuador) Nilson Angulo (RSCA Futures)
- (Sweden) Henrik Bellman (RSCA Futures)
- (Belgium) David Hubert (RSCA Futures)
- (Belgium) Amando Lapage (RSCA Futures)
- (Belgium) Lucas Lissens (RSCA Futures)
- (Belgium) Chris Lokesa (RSCA Futures)
- (England) Luke Plange (RWD Molenbeek)
- (Brazil) Rikelmi (RWD Molenbeek)
- (Belgium) Gilles Ruyssen (RWD Molenbeek)
- (Belgium) Alexandro Calut (SL16 FC)
- (Netherlands) Noah Ohio (SL16 FC)
- (Burkina Faso) Abdoul Tapsoba (SL16 FC)
- (Morocco) Ayyoub Allach (Virton)
- (France) Emeric Dudouit (Virton)
1 goal (57 players)
- (Nigeria) Abdullahi Ibrahim Alhassan (Beerschot)
- (Switzerland) Chris Kablan (Beerschot)
- (Belgium) Andi Koshi (Beerschot)
- (Morocco) Ilias Sebaoui (Beerschot)
- (Switzerland) Léo Seydoux (Beerschot)
- (Belgium) Axl Van Himbeeck (Beerschot)
- (Burundi) Marco Weymans (Beerschot)
- (Nigeria) Taofeek Ismaheel (Beveren)
- (Belgium) Sem Audoor (Club NXT)
- (Belgium) Liam De Smet (Club NXT)
- (Ecuador) Joel Ordóñez (Club NXT)
- (Belgium) Jorne Spileers (Club NXT)
- (Belgium) Jano Willems (Club NXT)
- (Indonesia) Marselino Ferdinan (Deinze)
- (Ukraine) Denys Prychynenko (Deinze)
- (Belgium) Kenneth Schuermans (Deinze)
- (Belgium) Jannes Vansteenkiste (Deinze)
- (Belgium) Alexandre De Bruyn (Dender EH)
- (Belgium) Joachim Ngongo (Dender EH)
- (Belgium) Jasper Van Oudenhove (Dender EH)
- (Tanzania) Kelvin John (Jong Genk)
- (Hungary) András Németh (Jong Genk)
- (Belgium) Cédric Nuozzi (Jong Genk)
- (Belgium) Tuur Rommens (Jong Genk)
- (Belgium) Mathias Delorge (Lierse Kempenzonen)
- (Belgium) Pieter De Schrijver (Lierse Kempenzonen)
- (Belgium) Brent Laes (Lierse Kempenzonen)
- (Belgium) Jarno Libert (Lierse Kempenzonen)
- (Belgium) Jens Naessens (Lierse Kempenzonen)
- (Belgium) Lucas Walbrecq (Lierse Kempenzonen)
- (Morocco) Nassim Chadli (Lommel)
- (Czech Republic) Christophe Kabongo (Lommel)
- (Belgium) Laurent Lemoine (Lommel)
- (Spain) Eric Monjonell (Lommel)
- (Belgium) Glenn Neven (Lommel)
- (Brazil) Caio Roque (Lommel)
- (Hungary) Zalán Vancsa (Lommel)
- (Belgium) Stijn Wuytens (Lommel)
- (Belgium) Mohamed Bouchouari (RSCA Futures)
- (Belgium) Nils De Wilde (RSCA Futures)
- (Belgium) Amadou Diallo (RSCA Futures)
- (Belgium) Julien Duranville (RSCA Futures)
- (Belgium) Théo Leoni (RSCA Futures)
- (Brazil) Barreto (RWD Molenbeek)
- (Belgium) Alexis De Sart (RWD Molenbeek)
- (Belgium) Jonathan Heris (RWD Molenbeek)
- (Belgium) Sacha Banse (SL16 FC)
- (Luxembourg) Rayan Berberi (SL16 FC)
- (Senegal) Birame Diaw (SL16 FC)
- (Belgium) Noah Dodeigne (SL16 FC)
- (Belgium) Mouad El Fanis (SL16 FC)
- (Belgium) Massis Guluk (SL16 FC)
- (France) Pierre Bourdin (Virton)
- (France) Marc-Olivier Doué (Virton)
- (France) Ruben Droehnlé (Virton)
- (France) Karim Ilunga (Virton)
- (Belgium) Kéres Masangu (Virton)
1 own goal (11 players)
- (Nigeria) Abdullahi Ibrahim Alhassan (Beerschot, scored for Beveren)
- (Greece) Apostolos Konstantopoulos (Beerschot, scored for RWD Molenbeek)
- (Belgium) Joachim Van Damme (Beveren, scored for RWD Molenbeek)
- (United States) Owen Otasowie (Club NXT, scored for Beveren)
- (Belgium) Xavier Gies (Dender EH, scored for Club NXT)
- (Belgium) Amine Et Taïbi (Jong Genk, scored for Dender EH)
- (Belgium) Maxime Delanghe (Lierse Kempenzonen, scored for RWD Molenbeek)
- (Montenegro) Nikola Ivezić (Lommel, scored for RWD Molenbeek)
- (Spain) Eric Monjonell (Lommel, scored for RWD Molenbeek)
- (Senegal) Birame Diaw (SL16 FC, scored for Deinze)
- (Belgium) Jonas Vinck (Virton, scored for Lommel)

=== Team of the season ===
Upon completion of the regular season a team of the season award was compiled, based upon the results of the team of the week results throughout the season, constructed based on nominations from managers, assistant-managers, journalists and analysts. The results were announced from 22 May 2023, with one player revealed each day.

Pos		Player	Club	Ref
GK	(Netherlands)	Beau Reus	Beveren	
RB	(Algeria)	Rafik Belghali	Lommel	
CB	(Republic of Ireland)	Jake O'Brien	RWD Molenbeek	
CB	(Serbia)	Aleksandar Vukotić	Beveren	
LB	(Belgium)	Joaquin Seys	Club NXT	
MF	(Belgium)	Ryan Sanusi	Beerschot	
MF	(Belgium)	Youssef Challouk	RWD Molenbeek	
MF	(Belgium)	Guillaume De Schryver	Lierse Kempenzonen	
LW	(Belgium)	Kylian Hazard	RWD Molenbeek	
FW	(France)	Thierno Barry	Beveren	
RW	(Belgium)	Zakaria El Ouahdi	RWD Molenbeek	

== Number of teams by provinces ==
Number of teams	Province or region	Team(s)
3	East Flanders	Deinze, Dender EH and Beveren
2	Antwerp	Beerschot and Lierse Kempenzonen
2	Brussels	RSCA Futures and RWD Molenbeek
2	Limburg	Jong Genk and Lommel
1	Liège	SL16 FC
1	Luxembourg	Virton
1	West Flanders	Club NXT

== Attendances ==
#	Club	Average
1	Beerschot	3,366
2	Beveren	3,108
3	RWDM	2,798
4	Lierse	2,397
5	Virton	1,392
6	Dender	1,021
7	Lommel	963
8	RSCA Futures	861
9	Jong Genk	674
10	Club NXT	650
11	Deinze	578
12	SL16	425
