= Joaquin Seys =

Belgian footballer (born 2005)

- Seys with Belgium in 2026

Personal information
- Full name: Joaquin Ronny Seys
- Date of birth: 28 March 2005 (age 21)
- Place of birth: Ostend, Belgium
- Height: 1.78 m (5 ft 10 in)
- Position: Left-back

Team information
- Current team: Club Brugge
- Number: 65

Youth career
- 2011–2012: Oostende
- 2012–2022: Club Brugge

Senior career*
| Years | Team | Apps | (Gls) |
| 2022–2024 | Club NXT | 51 | (1) |
| 2024– | Club Brugge | 76 | (4) |

International career^{‡}
| 2022–2023 | Belgium U18 | 5 | (0) |
| 2023–2024 | Belgium U19 | 8 | (0) |
| 2025– | Belgium | 8 | (0) |
- * Club domestic league appearances and goals as of 31 October 2026 ‡ National team caps and goals as of 6 October 2026

Joaquin Ronny Seys (Dutch pronunciation: [ɟoːɑˈkɪm ˈsɛjs]; born 28 March 2005) is a Belgian professional footballer who plays as a left-back for Belgian Pro League club Club Brugge and the Belgium national team.

== Club career ==
Seys began playing football with Oostende, before joining the academy of Club Brugge in 2012. On 31 March 2022, Seys signed his first professional contract with Club Brugge until 2024, and was promoted to their reserves Club NXT where he became a starter. On 10 May 2023, he extended his contract with the club until 2026.

With his Club NXT coach Nicky Hayen promoted to senior first-team head coach, Seys made his senior debut with Club Brugge at the 2024 Belgian Super Cup on 20 July 2024, starting in a 2–1 loss to Union Saint-Gilloise.

Seys scored on his league debut a week later against KV Mechelen in a 1–1 draw, again as a starter. His selections continued into Club Brugge's UEFA Champions League campaign, making his debut in the competition against Borussia Dortmund, going off with the score 0–0 with 15 minutes to go. Without Seys, Club fell to a 3–0 home loss.

== International career ==
Seys is a youth international for Belgium, having played up to the Belgium U18s.

Following a series of notable displays, including a 1–0 Champions League win over Aston Villa, Seys was called up to the Belgium senior squad by coach Domenico Tedesco for UEFA Nations League ties in November 2024 against Italy and Israel. In his next match after the announcement, Seys scored against Beerschot in a 2–2 draw only to go off with a leg injury that forced him to withdraw from the squad.

On 15 May 2026, he was named in Belgium's squad for the 2026 FIFA World Cup.

== Career statistics ==
=== Club ===
As of match played 31 October 2026

Appearances and goals by club, season and competition
| Club | Season | League | | | Belgian Cup | | Europe | | Other | | Total | |
| Club | Season | Division | Apps | Goals | Apps | Goals | Apps | Goals | Apps | Goals | Apps | Goals |
|---|---|---|---|---|---|---|---|---|---|---|---|---|
| Club NXT | 2022–23 | Challenger Pro League | 24 | 0 | — | | — | | — | | 24 | 0 |
| Club NXT | 2023–24 | Challenger Pro League | 27 | 1 | — | | — | | — | | 27 | 1 |
| Club NXT | Total | | 51 | 1 | — | | — | | — | | 51 | 1 |
| Club Brugge | 2024–25 | Belgian Pro League | 27 | 2 | 2 | 0 | 10 (Note: Appearances in UEFA Champions League) | 0 | 1 (Note: Appearance in Belgian Super Cup) | 0 | 40 | 2 |
| Club Brugge | 2025–26 | Belgian Pro League | 39 | 2 | 2 | 0 | 13 | 3 | 1 | 0 | 55 | 5 |
| Club Brugge | 2026–27 | Belgian Pro League | 10 | 0 | 1 | 0 | 3 | 1 | 1 | 0 | 15 | 1 |
| Club Brugge | Total | | 76 | 4 | 5 | 0 | 26 | 4 | 3 | 0 | 110 | 8 |
| Career total | | | 127 | 5 | 5 | 0 | 26 | 4 | 3 | 0 | 161 | 9 |

=== International ===
As of match played 5 October 2026

Appearances and goals by national team and year
| National team | Year | Apps | Goals |
|---|---|---|---|
| Belgium | 2025 | 2 | 0 |
| Belgium | 2026 | 6 | 0 |
| Total | | 8 | 0 |

== Honours ==
Club Brugge

- Belgian Pro League: 2025–26
- Belgian Cup: 2024–25
- Belgian Super Cup: 2025

Individual

- Dominique D'Onofrio Award: 2024
