= Chemsdine Talbi =

Footballer (born 2005)

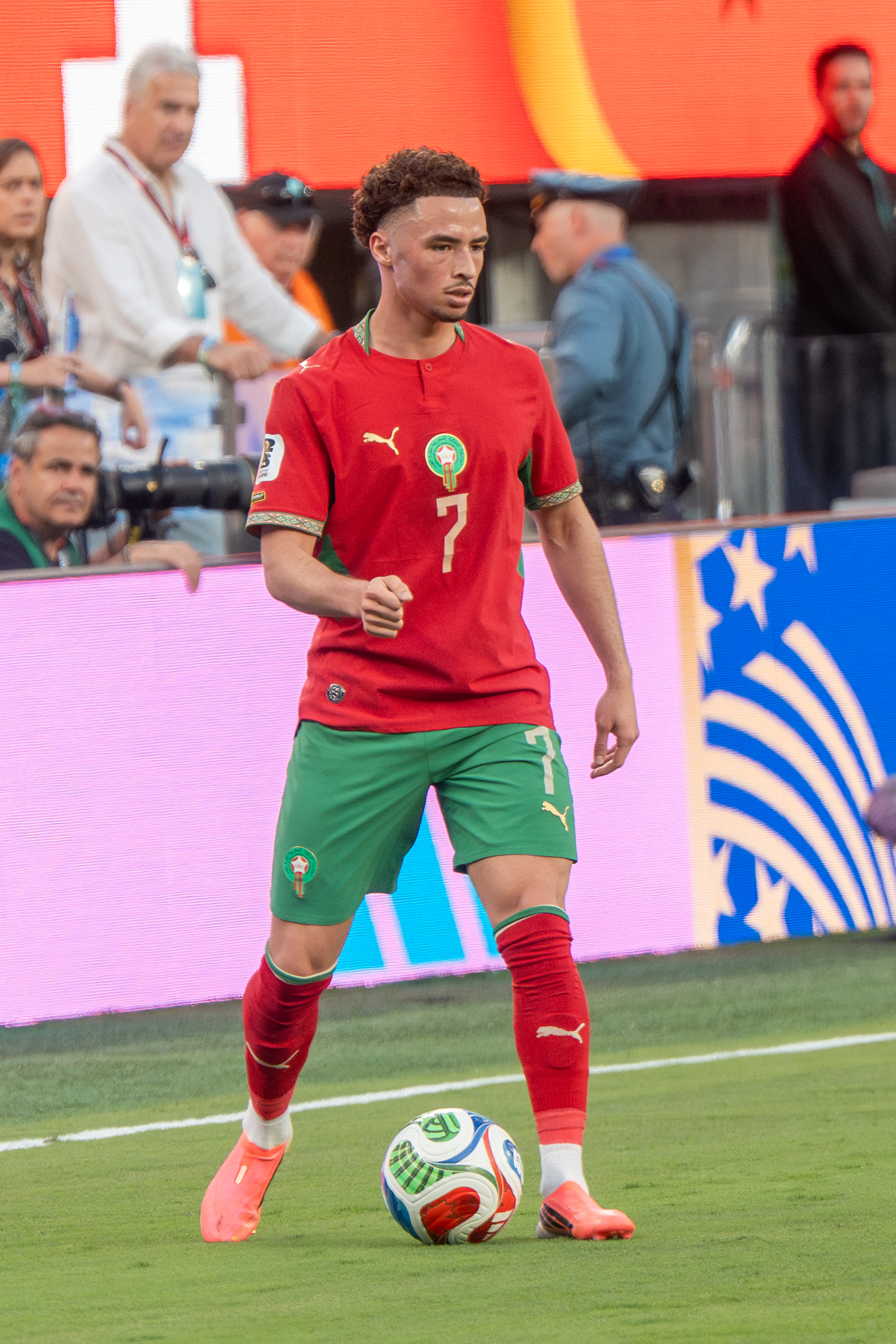
- Talbi with Morocco in 2026

Personal information
- Date of birth: 9 May 2005 (age 21)
- Place of birth: Sambreville, Belgium
- Height: 1.75 m (5 ft 9 in)
- Position: Winger

Team information
- Current team: Sunderland
- Number: 7

Youth career
- 2011-2014: KFC Rhodienne - de Hoek
- 2015–2022: Club Brugge

Senior career*
Years	Team	Apps	(Gls)
2022–2023	Club NXT	33	(6)
2023–2025	Club Brugge	35	(4)
2025–	Sunderland	32	(4)

International career^{‡}
2020	Belgium U15	3	(0)
2021–2022	Belgium U17	11	(4)
2022–2023	Belgium U18	6	(3)
2025–	Morocco	10	(0)
Medal record
Men's football
Representing Morocco
Africa Cup of Nations
Winner	2025 Morocco
- * Club domestic league appearances and goals as of 18:18, 8 November 2026 (UTC) ‡ National team caps and goals as of 9 July 2026 (UTC)

Chemsdine Talbi (Note: Arabic: شَمْس الدِّين الطَّالِبِيّ) (born 9 May 2005) is a professional footballer who plays as a winger for Premier League club Sunderland. Born in Belgium, he plays for the Morocco national team.

== Club career ==
=== Club NXT ===
Talbi played with KFC Rhodienne de Hoek as a junior, playing for one year with Royale Union Tubize-Braine until 2015 when he joined Club Brugge. In July 2022 Talbi signed a three-year professional contract with Club Brugge into 2025. He started the 2022–23 season playing for Club NXT, in the Challenger Pro League, Belgian football's second division. He scored on his professional debut against SL16 FC in August 2022, and again the following week against Lierse Kempenzonen.

=== Club Brugge ===
In February 2023, Talbi began training as part of the first team squad of Club Brugge. This was reported as a reward for his playing form. He made his league debut for Club Brugge on 18 March 2023 when he came on as a second-half substitute against KV Kortrijk.

Talbi would also score his first professional goal against Kortrijk in a 3–0 away win at the Guldensporen Stadion on 14 September 2024, Four days later, he made his UEFA Champions League debut as a substitute in a 3–0 loss to Borussia Dortmund.

On 18 February 2025, he scored his first Champions League goals, netting a brace in a 3–1 away victory against Atalanta in the second leg of the knockout play-offs, contributing to his team's progression to the Round of 16 with a 5–2 aggregate win, which earned him the player of the match award.

=== Sunderland ===
On 9 July 2025, Talbi signed for newly promoted Premier League club Sunderland on a five-year deal for an undisclosed fee, reported to be worth £16.5 million plus a potential £2.5 million in add-ons. Later that year, on 25 October, he scored his first goal for the club in the stoppage time of a 2–1 away win over Chelsea.

== International career ==
Talbi was born in Belgium, the son of a Moroccan father and Belgian mother. He played for Belgium U17 in the 2022 UEFA European Under-17 Championship, scoring a goal in a 3–1 victory against Turkey U17.

On 3 March 2025, Talbi chose to represent Morocco. On 19 March, after he received his first call-up to the Morocco national team he described it as a "childhood dream come true".

On 11 December 2025, Talbi was called up to the Morocco squad for the 2025 Africa Cup of Nations. He was therefore called up to play at the 2026 FIFA World Cup.

On 26 May 2026, Talbi was selected in the 26-man squad for the 2026 FIFA World Cup.

In Morocco's Round of 32 match against the Netherlands, he assisted the only goal for Morocco, a stoppage-time cross to Issa Diop in the 90+1 minute, and scored his penalty attempt in the shootout, which Morocco ultimately won, 3–2.

== Career statistics ==
=== Club ===
As of match played 31 October 2026

Appearances and goals by club, season and competition
Club	Season	League			National cup (Note: Includes Belgian Cup, FA Cup)		League cup (Note: Includes EFL Cup)		Europe		Other		Total	
Club	Season	Division	Apps	Goals	Apps	Goals	Apps	Goals	Apps	Goals	Apps	Goals	Apps	Goals
Club NXT	2022–23	Challenger Pro League	28	5	—		—		—		—		28	5
Club NXT	2023–24	Challenger Pro League	5	1	—		—		—		—		5	1
Club NXT	Total		33	6	—		—		—		—		33	6
Club Brugge	2022–23	Belgian Pro League	5	0	0	0	—		0	0	0	0	5	0
Club Brugge	2023–24	Belgian Pro League	3	0	0	0	—		1 (Note: Appearance in UEFA Europa Conference League)	0	—		4	0
Club Brugge	2024–25	Belgian Pro League	27	4	4	0	—		11 (Note: Appearances in UEFA Champions League)	2	1 (Note: Appearance in Belgian Super Cup)	0	43	6
Club Brugge	Total		35	4	4	0	—		12	2	1	0	52	6
Sunderland	2025–26	Premier League	28	4	2	0	0	0	—		—		30	4
Sunderland	2026–27	Premier League	3	0	0	0	2	2	0	0	—		5	2
Sunderland	Total		31	4	2	0	2	2	0	0	—		35	6
Career total			99	14	6	0	2	2	12	2	1	0	120	18

=== International ===
As of match played 9 July 2026

Appearances and goals by national team and year
National team	Year	Apps	Goals
Morocco	2025	3	0
Morocco	2026	7	0
Total		10	0

== Honours ==
Club Brugge

- Belgian Pro League: 2023–24
- Belgian Cup: 2024–25

Morocco

- Africa Cup of Nations: 2025

== Notes ==
1. Arabic: شَمْس الدِّين الطَّالِبِيّ
