= Joel Ordóñez =

Ecuadorian footballer (born 2004)

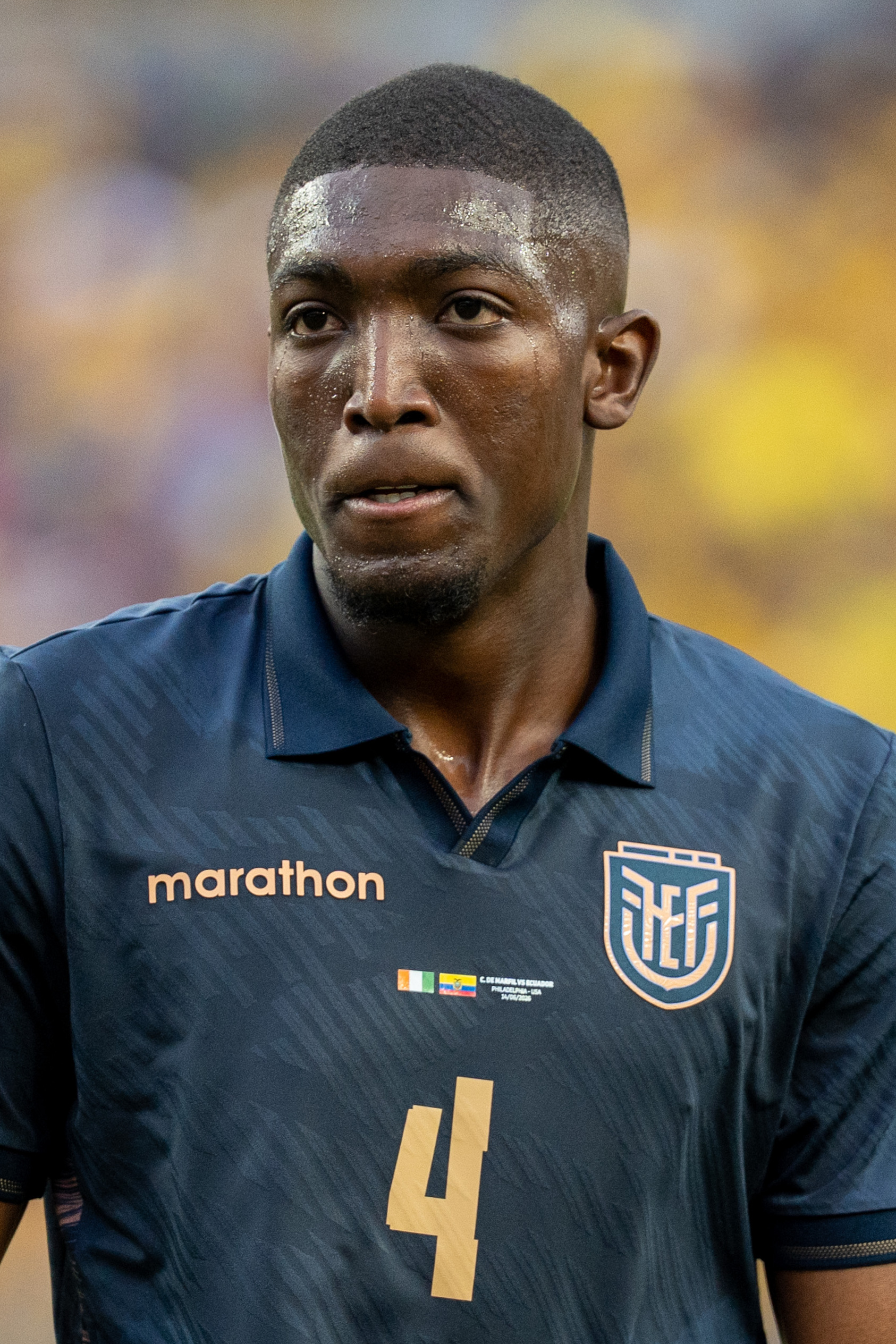
- Ordóñez with Ecuador in 2026

Personal information
- Full name: Joel Leandro Ordóñez Guerrero
- Date of birth: 21 April 2004 (age 22)
- Place of birth: Guayaquil, Ecuador
- Height: 1.88 m (6 ft 2 in)
- Position: Centre-back

Team information
- Current team: Club Brugge
- Number: 4

Youth career
- Deportivo Azogues
- 2015–2022: Independiente del Valle

Senior career*
Years	Team	Apps	(Gls)
2022	Independiente del Valle	8	(0)
2022–2023	Club NXT	32	(2)
2023–	Club Brugge	83	(4)

International career^{‡}
2019	Ecuador U15	4	(0)
2023	Ecuador U20	4	(0)
2024–	Ecuador	20	(0)
- * Club domestic league appearances and goals as of 22:42, 21 May 2026 (UTC) ‡ National team caps and goals as of 16:11, 1 July 2026 (UTC)

Joel Leandro Ordóñez Guerrero (born 21 April 2004) is an Ecuadorian professional footballer who plays as a centre-back for Belgian Pro League club Club Brugge and the Ecuador national team.

== Club career ==
=== Independiente del Valle ===
Ordóñez is a youth product of Deportivo Azogues and Independiente del Valle. He began his senior career with Independiente del Valle in 2022. He made his senior and professional debut for them in a 0–0 Ecuadorian Serie A draw with Guayaquil City on 9 April 2022.

=== Club Brugge ===
On 2 August 2022, Ordóñez joined Belgian Pro League side Club Brugge for a reported fee of €4 million, initially being assigned to Club NXT, their reserve side in the Challenger Pro League. He scored his first goal for Club NXT in a 1–0 win at home against Virton. On 19 August 2022, Ordóñez was promoted to the senior team of Club Brugge.

On 16 September 2025, Ordóñez extended his contract with Club Brugge until 2029.

== International career ==
Ordóñez first represented Ecuador internationally with the Ecuador U15s as captain at the 2019 South American U-15 Championship. He was called up to the Ecuador U20s for the South American Youth Football Championship, but was not released by his club for the tournament. He made his debut for Ecuador on 21 March 2024, starting and playing the full 90 minutes in a 2–0 friendly match victory against Guatemala.

On 31 May 2026, Ordóñez was selected in the 26-man squad for the 2026 FIFA World Cup.

== Career statistics ==
=== Club ===
As of match played 21 May 2026

Appearances and goals by club, season and competition
Club	Season	League			National cup		Continental		Other		Total	
Club	Season	Division	Apps	Goals	Apps	Goals	Apps	Goals	Apps	Goals	Apps	Goals
Independiente	2022	Ecuadorian Serie A	8	0	1	0	3 (Note: Appearances in Copa Libertadores)	0	—		12	0
Club NXT	2022–23	Challenger Pro League	29	1	—		—		—		29	1
Club NXT	2023–24	Challenger Pro League	3	1	—		—		—		3	1
Club NXT	Total		32	2	—		—		—		32	2
Club Brugge	2023–24	Belgian Pro League	19	0	3	0	11 (Note: Appearances in UEFA Europa Conference League)	0	0	0	33	0
Club Brugge	2024–25	Belgian Pro League	33	1	3	1	12 (Note: Appearances in UEFA Champions League)	0	0	0	47	2
Club Brugge	2025–26	Belgian Pro League	31	3	1	0	10	1	1 (Note: Appearance in Belgian Super Cup)	0	43	4
Club Brugge	Total		83	4	7	1	33	1	1	0	124	6
Career total			123	6	8	1	36	1	1	0	168	8

=== International ===
As of match played 30 June 2026

Appearances and goals by national team and year
National team	Year	Apps	Goals
Ecuador	2024	4	0
Ecuador	2025	10	0
Ecuador	2026	6	0
Total		20	0

== Honours ==
Club Brugge

- Belgian Pro League: 2023–24
- Belgian Cup: 2024–25
- Belgian Super Cup: 2025
