= Nordin Jackers =

Belgian footballer

Personal information
- Date of birth: 5 September 1997 (age 29)
- Place of birth: Veldwezelt, Belgium
- Height: 1.87 m (6 ft 2 in)
- Position: Goalkeeper

Team information
- Current team: Club Brugge
- Number: 29

Youth career
- Genk

Senior career*
Years	Team	Apps	(Gls)
2014–2019	Genk	9	(0)
2019–2020	→ Waasland-Beveren (loan)	16	(0)
2020–2022	Waasland-Beveren	74	(0)
2022–2024	OH Leuven	0	(0)
2023	OH Leuven U23	1	(0)
2023–2024	→ Club Brugge (loan)	9	(0)
2024–	Club Brugge	29	(0)

International career
2012–2013	Belgium U16	3	(0)
2013–2014	Belgium U17	5	(0)
2014	Belgium U18	1	(0)
2014–2016	Belgium U19	13	(0)
2017–2019	Belgium U21	12	(0)
- * Club domestic league appearances and goals as of 3 May 2026

Nordin Jackers (born 5 September 1997) is a Belgian professional footballer who plays as a goalkeeper for Club Brugge.

== Club career ==
On 2 September 2019, Jackers joined Waasland-Beveren on a season-long loan with an option to buy.

== International career ==
In June 2025 he was called up to the senior Belgium squad for the 2026 FIFA World Cup qualifying matches against North Macedonia and Wales on 6 and 9 June 2025, respectively.

== Career statistics ==
As of match played 3 May 2026

Appearances and goals by club, season and competition
Club	Season	League			Cup		Europe		Other		Total	
Club	Season	Division	Apps	Goals	Apps	Goals	Apps	Goals	Apps	Goals	Apps	Goals
Genk	2016–17	Belgian Pro League	4	0	0	0	1 (Note: Appearances in UEFA Europa League)	0	—		5	0
Genk	2017–18	Belgian Pro League	2	0	0	0	—		—		2	0
Genk	2018–19	Belgian Pro League	3	0	1	0	3	0	—		7	0
Genk	Total		9	0	1	0	4	0	—		14	0
Waasland-Beveren (loan)	2019–20	Belgian Pro League	16	0	0	0	—		—		16	0
Waasland-Beveren	2020–21	Belgian Pro League	28	0	1	0	—		2 (Note: Appearances in relegation play-offs)	0	31	0
Waasland-Beveren	2021–22	Challenger Pro League	26	0	1	0	—		—		27	0
Waasland-Beveren	Total		74	0	2	0	—		2	0	78	0
OH Leuven B	2022–23	Belgian National Division 1	1	0	—		—		—		1	0
Club Brugge (loan)	2023–24	Belgian Pro League	9	0	1	0	4 (Note: Appearances in UEFA Conference League)	0	—		14	0
Club Brugge	2024–25	Belgian Pro League	7	0	5	0	0	0	—		12	0
Club Brugge	2025–26	Belgian Pro League	21	0	0	0	6 (Note: Appearances in UEFA Champions League)	0	—		27	0
Club Brugge	Total		28	0	5	0	6	0	—		39	0
Career total			118	0	7	0	14	0	2	0	142	0

== Honours ==
Genk

- Belgian First Division: 2018–19
- Belgian Cup: 2024–25
