= Kyriani Sabbe =

Belgian footballer

Personal information
- Date of birth: 26 January 2005 (age 21)
- Place of birth: Ghent, Belgium
- Height: 1.75 m (5 ft 9 in)
- Positions: Full-back; wing-back

Team information
- Current team: Club Brugge
- Number: 64

Youth career
- KVC Ichtegem
- 2018–2020: Club Brugge

Senior career*
Years	Team	Apps	(Gls)
2020–2023	Club NXT	33	(2)
2023–	Club Brugge	82	(5)

International career^{‡}
2020	Belgium U15	2	(0)
2021–2022	Belgium U17	10	(0)
2022–2023	Belgium U18	5	(0)
2023–2024	Belgium U19	3	(0)
2025–	Belgium U21	4	(0)
- * Club domestic league appearances and goals as of 30 October 2026 ‡ National team caps and goals as of 15:09, 30 March 2026 (UTC)

Kyriani Sabbe (born 26 January 2005) is a Belgian professional footballer who plays as a full-back or wing-back for Club Brugge.

== Club career ==
On 31 January 2021, Sabbe made his debut for Brugge's reserve side, Club NXT in the Belgian First Division B against Seraing.

== International career ==
In September 2026, Sabbe was one of the players who were called up to the Belgium national team for the UEFA Nations League matches against Italy, France (home and away) and Turkey on 25 and 28 September and 2 and 5 October 2026.

== Personal life ==
Sabbe is of Guadeloupean descent through his father.

== Career statistics ==
=== Club ===
As of match played 30 October 2026

Appearances and goals by club, season and competition
Club	Season	League			Cup		Continental		Other		Total	
Club	Season	Division	Apps	Goals	Apps	Goals	Apps	Goals	Apps	Goals	Apps	Goals
Club NXT	2020–21	Challenger Pro League	7	0	—		—		—		7	0
Club NXT	2022–23	Challenger Pro League	23	2	—		—		—		23	2
Club NXT	2022–23	Challenger Pro League	3	0	—		—		—		3	0
Club NXT	Total		33	2	—		—		—		33	2
Club Brugge	2022–23	Belgian Pro League	3	0	0	0	0	0	—		3	0
Club Brugge	2023–24	Belgian Pro League	21	1	0	0	12 (Note: Appearances in UEFA Conference League)	0	—		33	1
Club Brugge	2024–25	Belgian Pro League	24	1	4	0	6 (Note: Appearances in UEFA Champions League)	1	0	0	34	2
Club Brugge	2025–26	Belgian Pro League	25	3	0	0	12	0	0	0	37	3
Club Brugge	2026–27	Belgian Pro League	9	0	0	0	3	0	1 (Note: Appearance in Belgian Super Cup)	0	13	0
Club Brugge	Total		82	5	4	0	33	1	1	0	120	6
Career total			115	7	4	0	33	1	1	0	153	8
