= Hans Vanaken =

Belgian footballer (born 1992)

- Vanaken with Belgium in 2026

Personal information
- Full name: Hans Vanaken
- Date of birth: 24 August 1992 (age 34)
- Place of birth: Pelt, Belgium
- Height: 1.95 m (6 ft 5 in)
- Position: Attacking midfielder

Team information
- Current team: Club Brugge
- Number: 20

Youth career
- 2002–2008: PSV Eindhoven
- 2008–2010: Lommel United

Senior career*
Years	Team	Apps	(Gls)
2010–2013	Lommel United	80	(21)
2013–2015	Lokeren	76	(19)
2015–	Club Brugge	423	(117)

International career^{‡}
2012	Belgium U20	2	(0)
2013–2014	Belgium U21	3	(0)
2018–	Belgium	45	(8)
- * Club domestic league appearances and goals as of 22:45, 30 October 2026 (UTC) ‡ National team caps and goals as of 19:19, 12 November 2026 (UTC)

Hans Vanaken (Dutch pronunciation: [ˈɦɑns vɑnˈaːkə(n)]; born 24 August 1992) is a Belgian professional footballer who plays as an attacking midfielder for Belgian Pro League club Club Brugge and the Belgium national team.

== Club career ==
=== Early career ===
Vanaken began his career at the youth team of Lommel United before leaving the club to join the PSV Eindhoven academy in 2002 when the former declared bankruptcy. He returned to a revamped Lommel in 2008 and made his senior debut for the club in the Belgian Second Division in 2010. He caught the eye of a number of top division clubs after a string of standout performances for Lommel and joined Lokeren in 2013.

He made top flight debut for Lokeren on 28 July 2013, when he scored two goals in a 3–2 win against defending champions Anderlecht. Vanaken was instrumental in Lokeren's run to the final of the 2013–14 Belgian Cup, playing in six of their seven matches and scoring one goal as his side edged out Zulte Waregem for the title. Vanaken further excelled in his second season in the top flight, scoring eight league goals and finishing third in the voting for the Belgian Golden Shoe award.

=== Club Brugge ===
It was announced in May 2015 that Lokeren had reached an agreement with Club Brugge over the transfer of Vanaken to the latter with the player signing a five-year deal subject to a medical. His maiden season at Club Brugge came with a spot in the starting line-up, where he proved instrumental in helping the club lift their 14th league championship.

In 2018, Vanaken scored 21 goals and provided a further 21 assists as he helped his team to its 15th league title and the Belgian Supercup. On 16 January 2019, Vanaken won the Belgian Golden Shoe award after having won the Belgian Professional Footballer of the Year award in May 2018.

Vanaken signed a new contract with Brugge on 9 August 2019, tying him to the club until 2024.

On 11 December 2019, Vanaken scored Brugge's equalizing goal in their Champions League home match against Spanish club Real Madrid; but Brugge would eventually fall to a 3–1 defeat and be parachuted into the UEFA Europa League Round of 32.

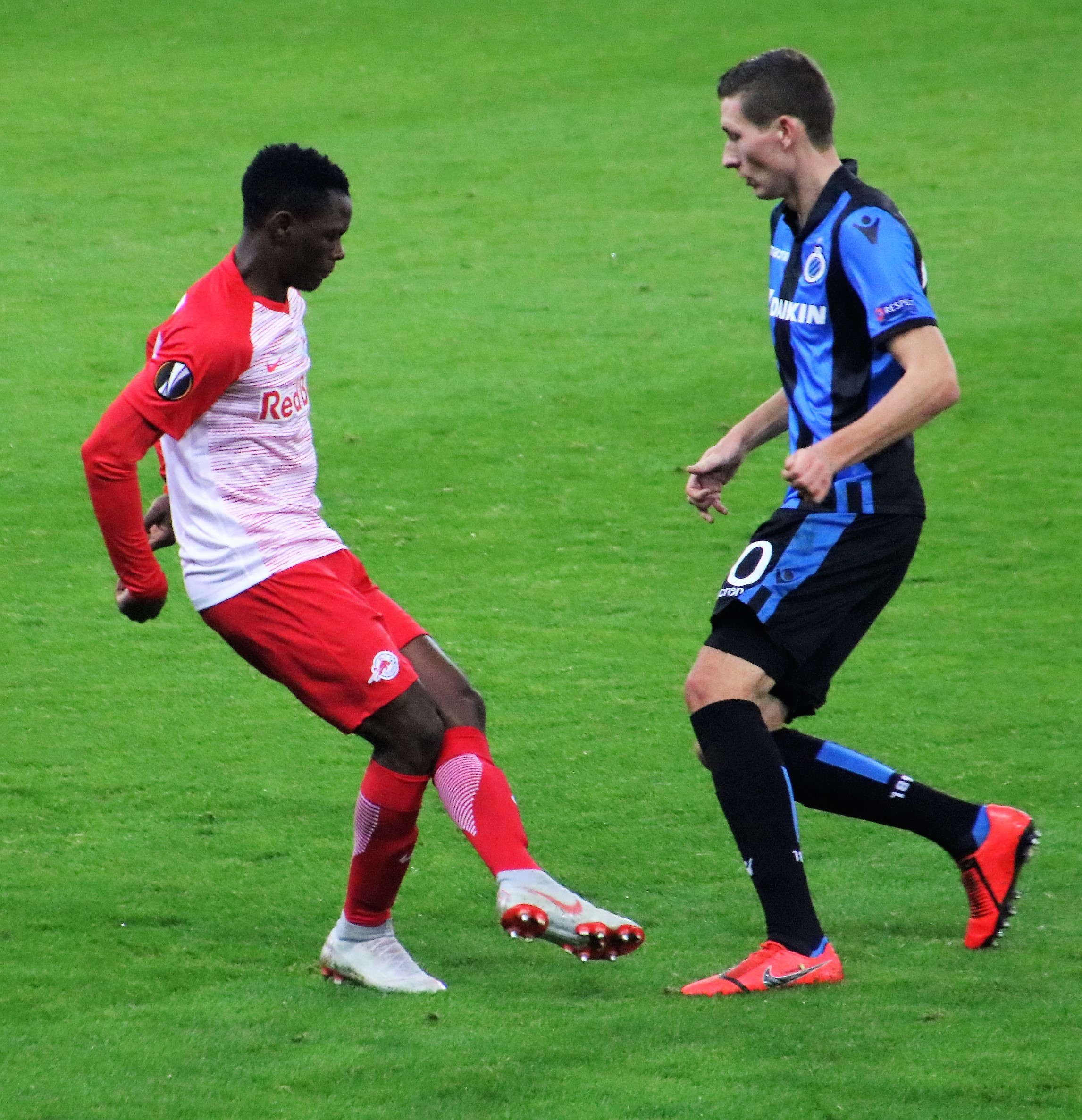
Vanaken with Club Brugge against Red Bull Salzburg in the 2018–19 Europa League

On 15 January 2020, Vanaken became the first player since Jan Ceulemans in 1986 to win back-to-back Belgian Golden Shoe awards. Vanaken won the award on the back of 20 goals and 7 assists during 2019. Club Brugge would win their third title in five seasons when the 2019-20 campaign was halted in March due to the COVID-19 pandemic, with one round to go in the regular season. The play-offs were cancelled, and the club were crowned champions by virtue of being top.

On 20 May 2021, Vanaken scored twice as Brugge drew 3–3 with rivals Anderlecht to retain the Belgian First Division A title, winning it for the fourth time in six years and 17th time overall. It was the first time since 1973 that Club Brugge had been crowned champions at Anderlecht's ground and the first time since 1976–77 and 1977–78 that Brugge had won back-to-back league titles.

Vanaken went on to help inspire Club to a third successive title in 2022, their first three-in-a-row since the 1970s, as they overhauled long-time leaders Union Saint-Gilloise in the play-offs, something that would happen again for Club's next title in 2023-24. On 6 November 2024, Vanaken scored the winning goal from the penalty spot in a 1–0 win over Aston Villa in the UEFA Champions League.

Vanaken won his third golden shoe in February 2025, which brought him level with Jan Ceulemans and Wilfried Van Moer. Only Paul Van Himst has won the award more times (4 times).

== International career ==
Vanaken with Belgium at the 2026 FIFA World Cup

Vanaken made his debut for the Belgium national team on 7 September 2018, replacing Eden Hazard in a 4–0 victory against Scotland at Hampden Park.

He scored his first two goals for Belgium on 30 March 2021, coming in an 8–0 win over Belarus in qualifying for the 2022 FIFA World Cup.

On 17 May 2021, Vanaken was one of two Belgium-based players to be selected for the final 26-man squad for the UEFA Euro 2020, along with club teammate Simon Mignolet.

Vanaken was named in Belgium's squad for the 2022 FIFA World Cup. In May 2026, he was selected in the 26-man squad for the 2026 FIFA World Cup. He scored his first World Cup goal in a 4–1 Round of 16 victory over hosts the United States, finding the net from 31.1 metres (102 ft) after capitalizing on an error by goalkeeper Matt Freese. At 33 years and 316 days old, he also became the second-oldest Belgian player to score at a World Cup, behind only Kevin De Bruyne, who had set the record earlier in the tournament.

== Style of play ==
Standing at 1.95 m (6 ft 5 in) tall, Vanaken is an imposing presence on the pitch. Praised for his vision and intelligence, he is a ball-retaining midfielder who can score, too. Pep Guardiola, Vincent Kompany, and Hansi Flick have all described Vanaken as a great player. Former Belgian international, Radja Nainggolan has called Vanaken "The most intelligent player he has ever seen on the Belgian fields".

Vanaken also has great passing ability. He is renowned for his ability to make passes under high pressure. His combination of vision, intelligence and a "wand of a left foot", make of Vanaken a key player for Club Brugge. He is the orchestrator of the team, often dictating the pace.

== Career statistics ==
=== Club ===
As of match played 30 October 2026

Appearances and goals by club, season and competition
Club	Season	League			Belgian Cup		Europe		Other		Total	
Club	Season	Division	Apps	Goals	Apps	Goals	Apps	Goals	Apps	Goals	Apps	Goals
Lommel United	2010–11	Belgian Second Division	16	1	0	0	–		–		16	1
Lommel United	2011–12	Belgian Second Division	32	10	2	0	–		–		34	10
Lommel United	2012–13	Belgian Second Division	32	10	0	0	–		–		32	10
Lommel United	Total		80	21	2	0	–		–		82	21
Lokeren	2013–14	Belgian Pro League	39	11	6	1	–		–		45	12
Lokeren	2014–15	Belgian Pro League	37	8	3	0	6 (Note: Appearances in UEFA Europa League)	2	1 (Note: Appearance in Belgian Super Cup)	0	47	10
Lokeren	Total		76	19	9	1	6	2	1	0	92	22
Club Brugge	2015–16	Belgian Pro League	36	10	6	2	8 (Note: Four appearances in UEFA Champions League, four appearances in UEFA Europa League)	0	1	0	51	12
Club Brugge	2016–17	Belgian Pro League	39	9	2	1	6 (Note: Appearances in UEFA Champions League)	0	1	0	48	10
Club Brugge	2017–18	Belgian Pro League	39	11	5	3	4 (Note: Two appearances in UEFA Champions League, two appearances in UEFA Europa League)	0	0	0	48	14
Club Brugge	2018–19	Belgian Pro League	40	14	1	0	8	2	1	1	50	17
Club Brugge	2019–20	Belgian Pro League	29	13	6	0	12 (Note: Ten appearances and four goals in UEFA Champions League, two appearances in UEFA Europa League)	4	–		47	17
Club Brugge	2020–21	Belgian Pro League	36	11	3	2	6	3	–		45	16
Club Brugge	2021–22	Belgian Pro League	39	11	5	1	6	3	0	0	50	15
Club Brugge	2022–23	Belgian Pro League	40	14	2	0	8	0	1	0	51	14
Club Brugge	2023–24	Belgian Pro League	38	5	5	0	16 (Note: Appearances in UEFA Europa Conference League)	7	–		59	12
Club Brugge	2024–25	Belgian Pro League	39	10	6	1	12	1	1	0	58	12
Club Brugge	2025–26	Belgian Pro League	39	7	3	0	14	4	1	1	57	12
Club Brugge	2026–27	Belgian Pro League	9	2	1	0	3	1	1	0	14	3
Club Brugge	Total		423	117	45	10	104	25	7	2	578	154
Career total			579	157	56	11	109	27	8	2	751	196

=== International ===
As of match played 12 November 2026

Appearances and goals by national team and year
National team	Year	Apps	Goals
Belgium	2018	2	0
Belgium	2019	2	0
Belgium	2020	4	0
Belgium	2021	9	3
Belgium	2022	6	2
Belgium	2023	0	0
Belgium	2024	0	0
Belgium	2025	9	2
Belgium	2026	13	1
Total		45	8

As of match played 6 July 2026
Scores and results list Belgium's goal tally first, score column indicates score after each Vanaken goal.

List of international goals scored by Hans Vanaken
No.	Date	Venue	Cap	Opponent	Score	Result	Competition	Ref.
1	30 March 2021	Den Dreef, Leuven, Belgium	9	Belarus	2–0	8–0	2022 FIFA World Cup qualification	
2	30 March 2021	Den Dreef, Leuven, Belgium	9	Belarus	8–0	8–0	2022 FIFA World Cup qualification	
3	2 September 2021	A. Le Coq Arena, Tallinn, Estonia	12	Estonia	1–1	5–2	2022 FIFA World Cup qualification	
4	26 March 2022	Aviva Stadium, Dublin, Ireland	18	Republic of Ireland	2–1	2–2	Friendly	
5	29 March 2022	Constant Vanden Stock Stadium, Anderlecht, Belgium	19	Burkina Faso	1–0	3–0	Friendly	
6	15 November 2025	Astana Arena, Astana, Kazakhstan	31	Kazakhstan	1–1	1–1	2026 FIFA World Cup qualification	
7	18 November 2025	Stade Maurice Dufrasne, Liège, Belgium	32	Liechtenstein	1–0	7–0	2026 FIFA World Cup qualification	
8	6 July 2026	Lumen Field, Seattle, United States	39	United States	3–1	4–1	2026 FIFA World Cup	

== Honours ==
Lokeren

- Belgian Cup: 2013–14

Club Brugge

- Belgian Pro League: 2015–16, 2017–18, 2019–20, 2020–21, 2021–22, 2023–24, 2025–26
- Belgian Cup: 2024–25
- Belgian Super Cup: 2016, 2018, 2021, 2022, 2025

Individual

- Belgian Professional Footballer of the Year: 2017–18, 2018–19
- Belgian Golden Shoe: 2018, 2019, 2024
- Belgian Pro League top assist provider: 2018–19
- Honorary Citizen of Lommel, Belgium: 2021
- UEFA Europa Conference League Team of the Season: 2023–24
