= Jorne Spileers =

Belgian footballer

Personal information
- Date of birth: 21 January 2005 (age 21)
- Height: 1.88 m (6 ft 2 in)
- Position: Defender

Team information
- Current team: Club Brugge
- Number: 58

Youth career
- Zulte Waregem
- 2014–2021: Club Brugge

Senior career*
Years	Team	Apps	(Gls)
2021–2023	Club NXT	21	(1)
2022–	Club Brugge	77	(1)

International career^{‡}
2020	Belgium U15	2	(1)
2021–2022	Belgium U17	8	(1)
2022–2023	Belgium U19	4	(0)
2023–	Belgium U21	19	(0)
- * Club domestic league appearances and goals as of 30 October 2026 ‡ National team caps and goals as of 08:24, 31 March 2026 (UTC)

Jorne Spileers (born 21 January 2005) is a Belgian footballer who plays as a defender for Club Brugge.

== International career ==
In November 2023 he was called up to the senior Belgium squad for a Friendly against Serbia, after Zinho Vanheusden left the squad due to injury.

== Career statistics ==
=== Club ===
As of 30 October 2026

Appearances and goals by club, season and competition
Club	Season	League			Cup		Continental		Other		Total	
Club	Season	Division	Apps	Goals	Apps	Goals	Apps	Goals	Apps	Goals	Apps	Goals
Club NXT	2020–21	Challenger Pro League	1	0	–		–		0	0	1	0
Club NXT	2021–22	Challenger Pro League	16	1	–		–		0	0	16	1
Club NXT	2021–22	Challenger Pro League	2	0	–		–		–		2	0
Club NXT	Total		19	1	–		–		0	0	19	1
Club Brugge	2022–23	Belgian Pro League	11	0	0	0	1 (Note: Appearances in UEFA Champions League)	0	–		12	0
Club Brugge	2023–24	Belgian Pro League	29	0	2	0	12 (Note: Appearances in UEFA Conference League)	1	–		43	1
Club Brugge	2024–25	Belgian Pro League	9	1	2	0	0	0	1 (Note: Appearance in Belgian Super Cup)	0	12	1
Club Brugge	2025–26	Belgian Pro League	22	0	1	0	8	1	1	0	32	1
Club Brugge	2026–27	Belgian Pro League	6	0	1	0	2	0	1	0	10	0
Club Brugge	Total		77	1	6	0	23	2	3	0	109	3
Career total			96	2	6	0	23	2	3	0	128	4

== Honours ==
Club Brugge

- Belgian Cup: 2024–25
