= Víctor Barberá =

Spanish footballer

Personal information
- Full name: Víctor Barberá Romero
- Date of birth: 20 August 2004 (age 22)
- Place of birth: Barcelona, Spain
- Height: 1.77 m (5 ft 10 in)
- Position: Striker

Team information
- Current team: Valladolid

Youth career
- 2012–2019: Sant Gabriel
- 2019–2020: Damm
- 2020–2022: Barcelona

Senior career*
Years	Team	Apps	(Gls)
2022–2023	Barcelona B	23	(8)
2023–2024	Club Brugge	4	(0)
2023–2024	Club NXT	19	(6)
2024–2026	Barcelona B	24	(11)
2026–	Valladolid	0	(0)

International career^{‡}
2022–2023	Spain U19	17	(9)
- * Club domestic league appearances and goals as of 15 May 2026 ‡ National team caps and goals as of 23:43, 26 March 2024 (UTC)

Víctor Barberá Romero (born 20 August 2004) is a Spanish professional footballer who plays as a striker for Real Valladolid.

== Club career ==
Born in Barcelona, Catalonia, Barberá is a youth product of Sant Gabriel, and moved to Damm in 2019. The following year in 2020 he joined Barcelona's youth academy, and in his first year was the top scorer of the División de Honor Juvenil de Fútbol with 19 goals.

Barberá was promoted to the reserves ahead of the 2022–23 season, and made his senior debut in a 0–0 Primera Federación tie with CD Alcoyano on 4 September 2022. On 14 June 2023, it was announced he was joining Club Brugge KV on a free transfer until 2027.

On 27 August 2024, Barberá returned to Barcelona Atlètic on a two-year contract. Despite featuring rarely in the following two years, he scored in a regular basis in the 2025–26 campaign, netting nine goals in 14 matches.

On 1 July 2026, Barberá signed a three-year contract with Segunda División side Real Valladolid.

== International career ==
Barberá was called up to the Spain U19s in September 2022.

== Playing style ==
Barberá is adept at pouncing on balls in the box and rebounds. An intelligent player, he often appears behind the defense and is a strong finisher. He's quick and can play out wide, but prefers to stay in the opponent's box. He has earned comparison in playstyle to Robert Lewandowski.

== Career statistics ==
=== Club ===
As of match played 19 October 2025

Appearances and goals by club, season and competition
Club	Season	League			Cup		Europe		Other		Total	
Club	Season	Division	Apps	Goals	Apps	Goals	Apps	Goals	Apps	Goals	Apps	Goals
Barcelona Atlètic	2022–23	Primera Federación	23	8	—		—		—		23	8
Club NXT	2023–24	Challenger Pro League	19	6	—		—		—		19	6
Club Brugge	2023–24	Belgian Pro League	4	0	2	0	1	0	—		7	0
Barcelona Atlètic	2024–25	Primera Federación	10	2	—		—		—		10	2
Barcelona Atlètic	2025–26	Segunda Federación	7	6	—		—		—		7	6
Barcelona Atlètic	Total		17	8	0	0	0	0	0	0	17	8
Career total			63	22	2	0	1	0	0	0	66	22

== Honours ==
Club Brugge

- Belgian Pro League: 2023–24

Individual

- UEFA European Under-19 Championship Top Scorer: 2023
- UEFA European Under-19 Championship Team of the Tournament: 2023
