= Shion Homma =

Japanese footballer (born 2000)

Shion Homma 本間 至恩
Personal information
- Full name: Shion Homma
- Date of birth: 9 August 2000 (age 26)
- Place of birth: Murakami, Niigata, Japan
- Height: 1.64 m (5 ft 4 1/2 in)
- Position: Midfielder

Team information
- Current team: FC Tokyo
- Number: 19

Youth career
- 2013–2018: Albirex Niigata

Senior career*
Years	Team	Apps	(Gls)
2017–2022	Albirex Niigata	123	(21)
2022–2024	Club Brugge	4	(1)
2022–2024	Club NXT	47	(7)
2024–2026	Urawa Red Diamonds	3	(0)
2025–2026	→ Cerezo Osaka (loan)	33	(2)
2026–	FC Tokyo	7	(1)
- * Club domestic league appearances and goals as of 22:35, 3 October 2026 (UTC)

Shion Homma (本間 至恩, Homma Shion; born 9 August 2000) is a Japanese professional football player who plays as a midfielder for J1 League club FC Tokyo.

== Club career ==
Homma joined J1 League club Albirex Niigata in 2017.

On 7 July 2022, he joined Belgian Pro League side Club Brugge. Having originally been assigned to the club's reserve team, Club NXT, he was subsequently promoted to the first team. On 4 June 2023, he scored a goal and served an assist to Noa Lang in a 2–1 league win over Union Saint-Gilloise.

On 1 July 2024, Homma joined J1 League club Urawa Red Diamonds on a permanent deal.

== Career statistics ==
As of 3 October 2026.

Appearances and goals by club, season and competition
Club	Season	League			National cup (Note: Includes Emperors Cup, Belgian Cup)		League cup (Note: Includes J.League Cup)		Continental		Total	
Club	Season	Division	Apps	Goals	Apps	Goals	Apps	Goals	Apps	Goals	Apps	Goals
Albirex Niigata	2017	J2 League	0	0	0	0	1	0	–		1	0
Albirex Niigata	2018	J2 League	1	1	0	0	4	0	–		5	1
Albirex Niigata	2019	J2 League	28	3	0	0	0	0	–		28	3
Albirex Niigata	2020	J2 League	40	7	0	0	0	0	–		40	7
Albirex Niigata	2021	J2 League	32	5	2	1	0	0	–		34	6
Albirex Niigata	2022	J2 League	22	5	0	0	0	0	–		22	5
Albirex Niigata	Total		123	20	2	1	5	0	0	0	130	21
Club Brugge KV	2022–23	Belgian Pro League	2	1	0	0	–		0	0	2	1
Club Brugge KV	2023–24	Belgian Pro League	2	0	1	0	–		2 (Note: Appearances in UEFA Conference League)	0	5	0
Club Brugge KV	Total		4	1	1	0	0	0	2	0	7	1
Club NXT	2022–23	Challenger Pro League	23	4	0	0	–		–		23	4
Club NXT	2023–24	Challenger Pro League	24	3	0	0	–		–		24	3
Club NXT	Total		47	7	0	0	0	0	0	0	47	7
Urawa Reds	2024	J1 League	3	0	0	0	0	0	–		3	0
Cerezo Osaka (loan)	2025	J1 League	18	0	2	0	0	0	–		20	0
Cerezo Osaka (loan)	2026	J1 (100)	15	2	–		–		–		15	2
Cerezo Osaka (loan)	Total		33	2	2	0	0	0	0	0	35	2
FC Tokyo	2026–27	J1 League	7	1	1	1	0	0	–		8	2
Career total			217	32	6	2	5	0	2	0	230	34
