= 2025–26 UEFA Champions League league phase =

International football club competition in Europe

The 2025–26 UEFA Champions League league phase began on 16 September 2025 and ended on 28 January 2026. A total of 36 teams competed in the league phase to decide the 24 places in the knockout phase of the 2025–26 UEFA Champions League.

Bodø/Glimt, Kairat, Pafos and Union Saint-Gilloise made their debut appearances in the league phase/group stage, with Kairat, based in Almaty, becoming the easternmost team to ever qualify for the Champions League since the introduction of the group stage. In addition, Bodø/Glimt, based in Bodø within the Arctic Circle, became the northernmost European team to ever compete in the Champions League. This marked the first time a Norwegian team participated in the competition proper since the 2007–08 season. This was also the first season since 2005–06 in which no Ukrainian sides qualified for the group stage/league phase. After being drawn to play away against Sporting CP, Kairat broke the record for the longest trip in UEFA competitions, travelling 6,911 kilometres (4,294 mi) from Almaty to Lisbon.

A total of 16 national associations were represented in the league phase.

== Format ==
Each team played eight matches, four at home and four away, against eight different opponents, with all 36 teams ranked in a single league table. Teams were separated into four pots based on their 2025 UEFA club coefficients, and each team played two teams from each of the four pots – one at home and one away. The top eight teams in the standings received a bye to the round of 16. The teams ranked from 9th to 24th contested the knockout phase play-offs, with the teams ranked from 9th to 16th seeded for the draw. Teams ranked from 25th to 36th were eliminated from European competition.

=== Tiebreakers ===
Teams were ranked according to points (3 points for a win, 1 point for a draw, 0 points for a loss). If two or more teams were equal on points upon completion of the league phase, the following tiebreaking criteria were applied, in the order given, to determine their rankings:

While the league phase was in progress, teams were ranked according to criteria 1–5 only, and if still tied, were given equal ranking and sorted alphabetically. Criteria 6–10 were only used after the final matches took place.

1. Goal difference;
2. Goals scored;
3. Away goals scored;
4. Wins;
5. Away wins;
6. Higher number of points obtained collectively by league phase opponents;
7. Superior collective goal difference of league phase opponents;
8. Higher number of goals scored collectively by league phase opponents;
9. Lower disciplinary points total (direct red card or expulsion for two yellow cards in one match = 3 points, yellow card = 1 point);
10. UEFA club coefficient.

== Teams and seeding ==
The 36 teams were divided into four pots of nine teams each, with the Champions League title holders automatically placed as the top seed of pot 1. All remaining teams were allocated to pots based on their 2025 UEFA club coefficients. The participants included:

- 29 teams which entered at this stage
- 7 winners of the play-off round (5 from the Champions Path, 2 from the League Path)

Key to colours
Teams ranked 1 to 8 advanced to the round of 16 as a seeded team
Teams ranked 9 to 16 advanced to the knockout phase play-offs as a seeded team
Teams ranked 17 to 24 advanced to the knockout phase play-offs as an unseeded team

Pot 1
Team	Notes	Coeff.
(French Football Federation) Paris Saint-Germain		118.500
(Royal Spanish Football Federation) Real Madrid		143.500
(The Football Association) Manchester City		137.750
(German Football Association) Bayern Munich		135.250
(The Football Association) Liverpool		125.500
(Italian Football Federation) Inter Milan		116.250
(The Football Association) Chelsea		109.000
(German Football Association) Borussia Dortmund		106.750
(Royal Spanish Football Federation) Barcelona		103.250

Pot 2
Team	Notes	Coeff.
(The Football Association) Arsenal		98.000
(German Football Association) Bayer Leverkusen		95.250
(Royal Spanish Football Federation) Atlético Madrid		93.500
(Portuguese Football Federation) Benfica		87.750
(Italian Football Federation) Atalanta		82.000
(Royal Spanish Football Federation) Villarreal		82.000
(Italian Football Federation) Juventus		74.250
(German Football Association) Eintracht Frankfurt		74.000
(Royal Belgian Football Association) Club Brugge		71.750

Pot 3
Team	Notes	Coeff.
(The Football Association) Tottenham Hotspur		70.250
(Royal Dutch Football Association) PSV Eindhoven		69.250
(Royal Dutch Football Association) Ajax		67.250
(Italian Football Federation) Napoli		61.000
(Portuguese Football Federation) Sporting CP		59.000
(Hellenic Football Federation) Olympiacos		56.500
(Football Association of the Czech Republic) Slavia Prague		51.000
(Norwegian Football Federation) Bodø/Glimt		49.000
(French Football Federation) Marseille		48.000

Pot 4
Team	Notes	Coeff.
(Danish Football Association) Copenhagen		44.875
(French Football Federation) Monaco		41.000
(Turkish Football Federation) Galatasaray		38.250
(Royal Belgian Football Association) Union Saint-Gilloise		36.000
(Association of Football Federations of Azerbaijan) Qarabağ		32.000
(Royal Spanish Football Federation) Athletic Bilbao		26.750
(The Football Association) Newcastle United		23.039
(Cyprus Football Association) Pafos		11.125
(Kazakhstan Football Federation) Kairat		5.500

Notes

1. ^{TH} Champions League title holders (automatic top seed of pot 1)
2. ^{EL} Europa League title holders
3. ^{CH} Winners of the play-off round (Champions Path)
4. ^{LP} Winners of play-off round (League Path)

== Draw ==
The draw for the league phase pairings was held at the Grimaldi Forum in Monaco on 28 August 2025, 18:00 CEST, with Zlatan Ibrahimović, the UEFA President's Awardee, and Kaká as drawing guests. All 36 teams were manually drawn using physical balls. For every team manually drawn, a guest on stage pressed a button for the automated software to digitally draw their opponents at random, determining which of their matches would be at home and which ones away. Each team faced two opponents from each of the four pots, one of which they faced at home and one away. Teams could not face opponents from their own association, and could only be drawn against a maximum of two sides from the same association. The draw started with Pot 1, assigning opponents to all teams, one after the other, and continued with the other pots in descending order until all teams were assigned their opponents. Due to the number of English clubs competing in the League Phase, all non-English clubs in Pot 1 were required to draw two English fixtures to avoid deadlocking the draw.

League phase opponents by club
Club	Pot 1 opponents		Pot 2 opponents		Pot 3 opponents		Pot 4 opponents		Avg coeff.
Club	Home	Away	Home	Away	Home	Away	Home	Away	Avg coeff.
(French Football Federation) Paris Saint-Germain	Bayern Munich	Barcelona	Atalanta	Bayer Leverkusen	Tottenham Hotspur	Sporting CP	Newcastle United	Athletic Bilbao	74.3
(Royal Spanish Football Federation) Real Madrid	Manchester City	Liverpool	Juventus	Benfica	Marseille	Olympiacos	Monaco	Kairat	72.0
(The Football Association) Manchester City	Borussia Dortmund	Real Madrid	Bayer Leverkusen	Villarreal	Napoli	Bodø/Glimt	Galatasaray	Monaco	77.1
(German Football Association) Bayern Munich	Chelsea	Paris Saint-Germain	Club Brugge	Arsenal	Sporting CP	PSV Eindhoven	Union Saint-Gilloise	Pafos	71.6
(The Football Association) Liverpool	Real Madrid	Inter Milan	Atlético Madrid	Eintracht Frankfurt	PSV Eindhoven	Marseille	Qarabağ	Galatasaray	76.8
(Italian Football Federation) Inter Milan	Liverpool	Borussia Dortmund	Arsenal	Atlético Madrid	Slavia Prague	Ajax	Kairat	Union Saint-Gilloise	72.9
(The Football Association) Chelsea	Barcelona	Bayern Munich	Benfica	Atalanta	Ajax	Napoli	Pafos	Qarabağ	72.5
(German Football Association) Borussia Dortmund	Inter Milan	Manchester City	Villarreal	Juventus	Bodø/Glimt	Tottenham Hotspur	Athletic Bilbao	Copenhagen	75.1
(Royal Spanish Football Federation) Barcelona	Paris Saint-Germain	Chelsea	Eintracht Frankfurt	Club Brugge	Olympiacos	Slavia Prague	Copenhagen	Newcastle United	68.6
(The Football Association) Arsenal	Bayern Munich	Inter Milan	Atlético Madrid	Club Brugge	Olympiacos	Slavia Prague	Kairat	Athletic Bilbao	69.6
(German Football Association) Bayer Leverkusen	Paris Saint-Germain	Manchester City	Villarreal	Benfica	PSV Eindhoven	Olympiacos	Newcastle United	Copenhagen	77.5
(Royal Spanish Football Federation) Atlético Madrid	Inter Milan	Liverpool	Eintracht Frankfurt	Arsenal	Bodø/Glimt	PSV Eindhoven	Union Saint-Gilloise	Galatasaray	75.8
(Portuguese Football Federation) Benfica	Real Madrid	Chelsea	Bayer Leverkusen	Juventus	Napoli	Ajax	Qarabağ	Newcastle United	75.7
(Italian Football Federation) Atalanta	Chelsea	Paris Saint-Germain	Club Brugge	Eintracht Frankfurt	Slavia Prague	Marseille	Athletic Bilbao	Union Saint-Gilloise	66.9
(Royal Spanish Football Federation) Villarreal	Manchester City	Borussia Dortmund	Juventus	Bayer Leverkusen	Ajax	Tottenham Hotspur	Copenhagen	Pafos	75.9
(Italian Football Federation) Juventus	Borussia Dortmund	Real Madrid	Benfica	Villarreal	Sporting CP	Bodø/Glimt	Pafos	Monaco	72.5
(German Football Association) Eintracht Frankfurt	Liverpool	Barcelona	Atalanta	Atlético Madrid	Tottenham Hotspur	Napoli	Galatasaray	Qarabağ	75.7
(Royal Belgian Football Association) Club Brugge	Barcelona	Bayern Munich	Arsenal	Atalanta	Marseille	Sporting CP	Monaco	Kairat	71.5
(The Football Association) Tottenham Hotspur	Borussia Dortmund	Paris Saint-Germain	Villarreal	Eintracht Frankfurt	Slavia Prague	Bodø/Glimt	Copenhagen	Monaco	70.9
(Royal Dutch Football Association) PSV Eindhoven	Bayern Munich	Liverpool	Atlético Madrid	Bayer Leverkusen	Napoli	Olympiacos	Union Saint-Gilloise	Newcastle United	78.3
(Royal Dutch Football Association) Ajax	Inter Milan	Chelsea	Benfica	Villarreal	Olympiacos	Marseille	Galatasaray	Qarabağ	71.2
(Italian Football Federation) Napoli	Chelsea	Manchester City	Eintracht Frankfurt	Benfica	Sporting CP	PSV Eindhoven	Qarabağ	Copenhagen	76.7
(Portuguese Football Federation) Sporting CP	Paris Saint-Germain	Bayern Munich	Club Brugge	Juventus	Marseille	Napoli	Kairat	Athletic Bilbao	67.6
(Hellenic Football Federation) Olympiacos	Real Madrid	Barcelona	Bayer Leverkusen	Arsenal	PSV Eindhoven	Ajax	Pafos	Kairat	74.1
(Football Association of the Czech Republic) Slavia Prague	Barcelona	Inter Milan	Arsenal	Atalanta	Bodø/Glimt	Tottenham Hotspur	Athletic Bilbao	Pafos	69.6
(Norwegian Football Federation) Bodø/Glimt	Manchester City	Borussia Dortmund	Juventus	Atlético Madrid	Tottenham Hotspur	Slavia Prague	Monaco	Galatasaray	76.6
(French Football Federation) Marseille	Liverpool	Real Madrid	Atalanta	Club Brugge	Ajax	Sporting CP	Newcastle United	Union Saint-Gilloise	76.0
(Danish Football Association) Copenhagen	Borussia Dortmund	Barcelona	Bayer Leverkusen	Villarreal	Napoli	Tottenham Hotspur	Kairat	Qarabağ	69.5
(French Football Federation) Monaco	Manchester City	Real Madrid	Juventus	Club Brugge	Tottenham Hotspur	Bodø/Glimt	Galatasaray	Pafos	74.5
(Turkish Football Federation) Galatasaray	Liverpool	Manchester City	Atlético Madrid	Eintracht Frankfurt	Bodø/Glimt	Ajax	Union Saint-Gilloise	Monaco	78.0
(Royal Belgian Football Association) Union Saint-Gilloise	Inter Milan	Bayern Munich	Atalanta	Atlético Madrid	Marseille	PSV Eindhoven	Newcastle United	Galatasaray	75.7
(Association of Football Federations of Azerbaijan) Qarabağ	Chelsea	Liverpool	Eintracht Frankfurt	Benfica	Ajax	Napoli	Copenhagen	Athletic Bilbao	74.5
(Royal Spanish Football Federation) Athletic Bilbao	Paris Saint-Germain	Borussia Dortmund	Arsenal	Atalanta	Sporting CP	Slavia Prague	Qarabağ	Newcastle United	71.3
(The Football Association) Newcastle United	Barcelona	Paris Saint-Germain	Benfica	Bayer Leverkusen	PSV Eindhoven	Marseille	Athletic Bilbao	Union Saint-Gilloise	73.1
(Cyprus Football Association) Pafos	Bayern Munich	Chelsea	Villarreal	Juventus	Slavia Prague	Olympiacos	Monaco	Kairat	69.3
(Kazakhstan Football Federation) Kairat	Real Madrid	Inter Milan	Club Brugge	Arsenal	Olympiacos	Sporting CP	Pafos	Copenhagen	75.1

== League phase table ==
Pos	Team	Pld	W	D	L	GF	GA	GD	Pts	Qualification
1	(The Football Association) Arsenal	8	8	0	0	23	4	+19	24	Advance to round of 16 (seeded)
2	(German Football Association) Bayern Munich	8	7	0	1	22	8	+14	21	Advance to round of 16 (seeded)
3	(The Football Association) Liverpool	8	6	0	2	20	8	+12	18	Advance to round of 16 (seeded)
4	(The Football Association) Tottenham Hotspur	8	5	2	1	17	7	+10	17	Advance to round of 16 (seeded)
5	(Royal Spanish Football Federation) Barcelona	8	5	1	2	22	14	+8	16	Advance to round of 16 (seeded)
6	(The Football Association) Chelsea	8	5	1	2	17	10	+7	16	Advance to round of 16 (seeded)
7	(Portuguese Football Federation) Sporting CP	8	5	1	2	17	11	+6	16	Advance to round of 16 (seeded)
8	(The Football Association) Manchester City	8	5	1	2	15	9	+6	16	Advance to round of 16 (seeded)
9	(Royal Spanish Football Federation) Real Madrid	8	5	0	3	21	12	+9	15	Advance to knockout phase play-offs (seeded)
10	(Italian Football Federation) Inter Milan	8	5	0	3	15	7	+8	15	Advance to knockout phase play-offs (seeded)
11	(French Football Federation) Paris Saint-Germain	8	4	2	2	21	11	+10	14	Advance to knockout phase play-offs (seeded)
12	(The Football Association) Newcastle United	8	4	2	2	17	7	+10	14	Advance to knockout phase play-offs (seeded)
13	(Italian Football Federation) Juventus	8	3	4	1	14	10	+4	13	Advance to knockout phase play-offs (seeded)
14	(Royal Spanish Football Federation) Atlético Madrid	8	4	1	3	17	15	+2	13	Advance to knockout phase play-offs (seeded)
15	(Italian Football Federation) Atalanta	8	4	1	3	10	10	0	13	Advance to knockout phase play-offs (seeded)
16	(German Football Association) Bayer Leverkusen	8	3	3	2	13	14	−1	12	Advance to knockout phase play-offs (seeded)
17	(German Football Association) Borussia Dortmund	8	3	2	3	19	17	+2	11	Advance to knockout phase play-offs (unseeded)
18	(Hellenic Football Federation) Olympiacos	8	3	2	3	10	14	−4	11	Advance to knockout phase play-offs (unseeded)
19	(Royal Belgian Football Association) Club Brugge	8	3	1	4	15	17	−2	10	Advance to knockout phase play-offs (unseeded)
20	(Turkish Football Federation) Galatasaray	8	3	1	4	9	11	−2	10	Advance to knockout phase play-offs (unseeded)
21	(French Football Federation) Monaco	8	2	4	2	8	14	−6	10	Advance to knockout phase play-offs (unseeded)
22	(Association of Football Federations of Azerbaijan) Qarabağ	8	3	1	4	13	21	−8	10	Advance to knockout phase play-offs (unseeded)
23	(Norwegian Football Federation) Bodø/Glimt	8	2	3	3	14	15	−1	9	Advance to knockout phase play-offs (unseeded)
24	(Portuguese Football Federation) Benfica	8	3	0	5	10	12	−2	9	Advance to knockout phase play-offs (unseeded)
25	(French Football Federation) Marseille	8	3	0	5	11	14	−3	9	
26	(Cyprus Football Association) Pafos	8	2	3	3	8	11	−3	9	
27	(Royal Belgian Football Association) Union Saint-Gilloise	8	3	0	5	8	17	−9	9	
28	(Royal Dutch Football Association) PSV Eindhoven	8	2	2	4	16	16	0	8	
29	(Royal Spanish Football Federation) Athletic Bilbao	8	2	2	4	9	14	−5	8	
30	(Italian Football Federation) Napoli	8	2	2	4	9	15	−6	8	
31	(Danish Football Association) Copenhagen	8	2	2	4	12	21	−9	8	
32	(Royal Dutch Football Association) Ajax	8	2	0	6	8	21	−13	6	
33	(German Football Association) Eintracht Frankfurt	8	1	1	6	10	21	−11	4	
34	(Football Association of the Czech Republic) Slavia Prague	8	0	3	5	5	19	−14	3	
35	(Royal Spanish Football Federation) Villarreal	8	0	1	7	5	18	−13	1	
36	(Kazakhstan Football Federation) Kairat	8	0	1	7	7	22	−15	1	

Source: UEFA
Rules for classification: League phase tiebreakers

== Results summary ==
=== By matchday ===
Matchday 1
Home team	Score	Away team
Athletic Bilbao (Spain)	0–2	(England) Arsenal
PSV Eindhoven (Netherlands)	1–3	(Belgium) Union Saint‑Gilloise
Juventus (Italy)	4–4	(Germany) Borussia Dortmund
Real Madrid (Spain)	2–1	(France) Marseille
Benfica (Portugal)	2–3	(Azerbaijan) Qarabağ
Tottenham Hotspur (England)	1–0	(Spain) Villarreal
Olympiacos (Greece)	0–0	(Cyprus) Pafos
Slavia Prague (Czech Republic)	2–2	(Norway) Bodø/Glimt
Ajax (Netherlands)	0–2	(Italy) Inter Milan
Bayern Munich (Germany)	3–1	(England) Chelsea
Liverpool (England)	3–2	(Spain) Atlético Madrid
Paris Saint-Germain (France)	4–0	(Italy) Atalanta
Club Brugge (Belgium)	4–1	(France) Monaco
Copenhagen (Denmark)	2–2	(Germany) Bayer Leverkusen
Eintracht Frankfurt (Germany)	5–1	(Turkey) Galatasaray
Manchester City (England)	2–0	(Italy) Napoli
Newcastle United (England)	1–2	(Spain) Barcelona
Sporting CP (Portugal)	4–1	(Kazakhstan) Kairat

Matchday 2
Home team	Score	Away team
Atalanta (Italy)	2–1	(Belgium) Club Brugge
Kairat (Kazakhstan)	0–5	(Spain) Real Madrid
Atlético Madrid (Spain)	5–1	(Germany) Eintracht Frankfurt
Chelsea (England)	1–0	(Portugal) Benfica
Inter Milan (Italy)	3–0	(Czech Republic) Slavia Prague
Bodø/Glimt (Norway)	2–2	(England) Tottenham Hotspur
Galatasaray (Turkey)	1–0	(England) Liverpool
Marseille (France)	4–0	(Netherlands) Ajax
Pafos (Cyprus)	1–5	(Germany) Bayern Munich
Qarabağ (Azerbaijan)	2–0	(Denmark) Copenhagen
Union Saint-Gilloise (Belgium)	0–4	(England) Newcastle United
Arsenal (England)	2–0	(Greece) Olympiacos
Monaco (France)	2–2	(England) Manchester City
Bayer Leverkusen (Germany)	1–1	(Netherlands) PSV Eindhoven
Borussia Dortmund (Germany)	4–1	(Spain) Athletic Bilbao
Barcelona (Spain)	1–2	(France) Paris Saint-Germain
Napoli (Italy)	2–1	(Portugal) Sporting CP
Villarreal (Spain)	2–2	(Italy) Juventus

Matchday 3
Home team	Score	Away team
Barcelona (Spain)	6–1	(Greece) Olympiacos
Kairat (Kazakhstan)	0–0	(Cyprus) Pafos
Arsenal (England)	4–0	(Spain) Atlético Madrid
Bayer Leverkusen (Germany)	2–7	(France) Paris Saint‑Germain
Copenhagen (Denmark)	2–4	(Germany) Borussia Dortmund
Newcastle United (England)	3–0	(Portugal) Benfica
PSV Eindhoven (Netherlands)	6–2	(Italy) Napoli
Union Saint-Gilloise (Belgium)	0–4	(Italy) Inter Milan
Villarreal (Spain)	0–2	(England) Manchester City
Athletic Bilbao (Spain)	3–1	(Azerbaijan) Qarabağ
Galatasaray (Turkey)	3–1	(Norway) Bodø/Glimt
Monaco (France)	0–0	(England) Tottenham Hotspur
Atalanta (Italy)	0–0	(Czech Republic) Slavia Prague
Chelsea (England)	5–1	(Netherlands) Ajax
Eintracht Frankfurt (Germany)	1–5	(England) Liverpool
Bayern Munich (Germany)	4–0	(Belgium) Club Brugge
Real Madrid (Spain)	1–0	(Italy) Juventus
Sporting CP (Portugal)	2–1	(France) Marseille

Matchday 4
Home team	Score	Away team
Slavia Prague (Czech Republic)	0–3	(England) Arsenal
Napoli (Italy)	0–0	(Germany) Eintracht Frankfurt
Atlético Madrid (Spain)	3–1	(Belgium) Union Saint-Gilloise
Bodø/Glimt (Norway)	0–1	(France) Monaco
Juventus (Italy)	1–1	(Portugal) Sporting CP
Liverpool (England)	1–0	(Spain) Real Madrid
Olympiacos (Greece)	1–1	(Netherlands) PSV Eindhoven
Paris Saint-Germain (France)	1–2	(Germany) Bayern Munich
Tottenham Hotspur (England)	4–0	(Denmark) Copenhagen
Pafos (Cyprus)	1–0	(Spain) Villarreal
Qarabağ (Azerbaijan)	2–2	(England) Chelsea
Ajax (Netherlands)	0–3	(Turkey) Galatasaray
Club Brugge (Belgium)	3–3	(Spain) Barcelona
Inter Milan (Italy)	2–1	(Kazakhstan) Kairat
Manchester City (England)	4–1	(Germany) Borussia Dortmund
Newcastle United (England)	2–0	(Spain) Athletic Bilbao
Marseille (France)	0–1	(Italy) Atalanta
Benfica (Portugal)	0–1	(Germany) Bayer Leverkusen

Matchday 5
Home team	Score	Away team
Ajax (Netherlands)	0–2	(Portugal) Benfica
Galatasaray (Turkey)	0–1	(Belgium) Union Saint‑Gilloise
Borussia Dortmund (Germany)	4–0	(Spain) Villarreal
Chelsea (England)	3–0	(Spain) Barcelona
Bodø/Glimt (Norway)	2–3	(Italy) Juventus
Manchester City (England)	0–2	(Germany) Bayer Leverkusen
Marseille (France)	2–1	(England) Newcastle United
Slavia Prague (Czech Republic)	0–0	(Spain) Athletic Bilbao
Napoli (Italy)	2–0	(Azerbaijan) Qarabağ
Copenhagen (Denmark)	3–2	(Kazakhstan) Kairat
Pafos (Cyprus)	2–2	(France) Monaco
Arsenal (England)	3–1	(Germany) Bayern Munich
Atlético Madrid (Spain)	2–1	(Italy) Inter Milan
Eintracht Frankfurt (Germany)	0–3	(Italy) Atalanta
Liverpool (England)	1–4	(Netherlands) PSV Eindhoven
Olympiacos (Greece)	3–4	(Spain) Real Madrid
Paris Saint-Germain (France)	5–3	(England) Tottenham Hotspur
Sporting CP (Portugal)	3–0	(Belgium) Club Brugge

Matchday 6
Home team	Score	Away team
Kairat (Kazakhstan)	0–1	(Greece) Olympiacos
Bayern Munich (Germany)	3–1	(Portugal) Sporting CP
Monaco (France)	1–0	(Turkey) Galatasaray
Atalanta (Italy)	2–1	(England) Chelsea
Barcelona (Spain)	2–1	(Germany) Eintracht Frankfurt
Inter Milan (Italy)	0–1	(England) Liverpool
PSV Eindhoven (Netherlands)	2–3	(Spain) Atlético Madrid
Union Saint-Gilloise (Belgium)	2–3	(France) Marseille
Tottenham Hotspur (England)	3–0	(Czech Republic) Slavia Prague
Qarabağ (Azerbaijan)	2–4	(Netherlands) Ajax
Villarreal (Spain)	2–3	(Denmark) Copenhagen
Athletic Bilbao (Spain)	0–0	(France) Paris Saint-Germain
Bayer Leverkusen (Germany)	2–2	(England) Newcastle United
Borussia Dortmund (Germany)	2–2	(Norway) Bodø/Glimt
Club Brugge (Belgium)	0–3	(England) Arsenal
Juventus (Italy)	2–0	(Cyprus) Pafos
Real Madrid (Spain)	1–2	(England) Manchester City
Benfica (Portugal)	2–0	(Italy) Napoli

Matchday 7
Home team	Score	Away team
Kairat (Kazakhstan)	1–4	(Belgium) Club Brugge
Bodø/Glimt (Norway)	3–1	(England) Manchester City
Copenhagen (Denmark)	1–1	(Italy) Napoli
Inter Milan (Italy)	1–3	(England) Arsenal
Olympiacos (Greece)	2–0	(Germany) Bayer Leverkusen
Real Madrid (Spain)	6–1	(France) Monaco
Sporting CP (Portugal)	2–1	(France) Paris Saint-Germain
Tottenham Hotspur (England)	2–0	(Germany) Borussia Dortmund
Villarreal (Spain)	1–2	(Netherlands) Ajax
Galatasaray (Turkey)	1–1	(Spain) Atlético Madrid
Qarabağ (Azerbaijan)	3–2	(Germany) Eintracht Frankfurt
Atalanta (Italy)	2–3	(Spain) Athletic Bilbao
Chelsea (England)	1–0	(Cyprus) Pafos
Bayern Munich (Germany)	2–0	(Belgium) Union Saint-Gilloise
Juventus (Italy)	2–0	(Portugal) Benfica
Newcastle United (England)	3–0	(Netherlands) PSV Eindhoven
Marseille (France)	0–3	(England) Liverpool
Slavia Prague (Czech Republic)	2–4	(Spain) Barcelona

Matchday 8
Home team	Score	Away team
Ajax (Netherlands)	1–2	(Greece) Olympiacos
Arsenal (England)	3–2	(Kazakhstan) Kairat
Monaco (France)	0–0	(Italy) Juventus
Athletic Bilbao (Spain)	2–3	(Portugal) Sporting CP
Atlético Madrid (Spain)	1–2	(Norway) Bodø/Glimt
Bayer Leverkusen (Germany)	3–0	(Spain) Villarreal
Borussia Dortmund (Germany)	0–2	(Italy) Inter Milan
Club Brugge (Belgium)	3–0	(France) Marseille
Eintracht Frankfurt (Germany)	0–2	(England) Tottenham Hotspur
Barcelona (Spain)	4–1	(Denmark) Copenhagen
Liverpool (England)	6–0	(Azerbaijan) Qarabağ
Manchester City (England)	2–0	(Turkey) Galatasaray
Pafos (Cyprus)	4–1	(Czech Republic) Slavia Prague
Paris Saint-Germain (France)	1–1	(England) Newcastle United
PSV Eindhoven (Netherlands)	1–2	(Germany) Bayern Munich
Union Saint-Gilloise (Belgium)	1–0	(Italy) Atalanta
Benfica (Portugal)	4–2	(Spain) Real Madrid
Napoli (Italy)	2–3	(England) Chelsea

=== By team ===
Results by Pot 1 team
Team	Matchday							
Team	1	2	3	4	5	6	7	8
(France) Paris Saint-Germain	ATA (H)	BAR (A)	LEV (A)	BAY (H)	TOT (H)	ATH (A)	SPO (A)	NEW (H)
(France) Paris Saint-Germain	4–0	2–1	7–2	1–2	5–3	0–0	1–2	1–1
(Spain) Real Madrid	MAR (H)	KAI (A)	JUV (H)	LIV (A)	OLY (A)	MCI (H)	MON (H)	BEN (A)
(Spain) Real Madrid	2–1	5–0	1–0	0–1	4–3	1–2	6–1	2–4
(England) Manchester City	NAP (H)	MON (A)	VIL (A)	DOR (H)	LEV (H)	RMA (A)	BOD (A)	GAL (H)
(England) Manchester City	2–0	2–2	2–0	4–1	0–2	2–1	1–3	2–0
(Germany) Bayern Munich	CHE (H)	PAF (A)	BRU (H)	PAR (A)	ARS (A)	SPO (H)	USG (H)	PSV (A)
(Germany) Bayern Munich	3–1	5–1	4–0	2–1	1–3	3–1	2–0	2–1
(England) Liverpool	ATM (H)	GAL (A)	FRA (A)	RMA (H)	PSV (H)	INT (A)	MAR (A)	QRB (H)
(England) Liverpool	3–2	0–1	5–1	1–0	1–4	1–0	3–0	6–0
(Italy) Inter Milan	AJX (A)	SLP (H)	USG (A)	KAI (H)	ATM (A)	LIV (H)	ARS (H)	DOR (A)
(Italy) Inter Milan	2–0	3–0	4–0	2–1	1–2	0–1	1–3	2–0
(England) Chelsea	BAY (A)	BEN (H)	AJX (H)	QRB (A)	BAR (H)	ATA (A)	PAF (H)	NAP (A)
(England) Chelsea	1–3	1–0	5–1	2–2	3–0	1–2	1–0	3–2
(Germany) Borussia Dortmund	JUV (A)	ATH (H)	CPH (A)	MCI (A)	VIL (H)	BOD (H)	TOT (A)	INT (H)
(Germany) Borussia Dortmund	4–4	4–1	4–2	1–4	4–0	2–2	0–2	0–2
(Spain) Barcelona	NEW (A)	PAR (H)	OLY (H)	BRU (A)	CHE (A)	FRA (H)	SLP (A)	CPH (H)
(Spain) Barcelona	2–1	1–2	6–1	3–3	0–3	2–1	4–2	4–1

Results by Pot 2 team
Team	Matchday							
Team	1	2	3	4	5	6	7	8
(England) Arsenal	ATH (A)	OLY (H)	ATM (H)	SLP (A)	BAY (H)	BRU (A)	INT (A)	KAI (H)
(England) Arsenal	2–0	2–0	4–0	3–0	3–1	3–0	3–1	3–2
(Germany) Bayer Leverkusen	CPH (A)	PSV (H)	PAR (H)	BEN (A)	MCI (A)	NEW (H)	OLY (A)	VIL (H)
(Germany) Bayer Leverkusen	2–2	1–1	2–7	1–0	2–0	2–2	0–2	3–0
(Spain) Atlético Madrid	LIV (A)	FRA (H)	ARS (A)	USG (H)	INT (H)	PSV (A)	GAL (A)	BOD (H)
(Spain) Atlético Madrid	2–3	5–1	0–4	3–1	2–1	3–2	1–1	1–2
(Portugal) Benfica	QRB (H)	CHE (A)	NEW (A)	LEV (H)	AJX (A)	NAP (H)	JUV (A)	RMA (H)
(Portugal) Benfica	2–3	0–1	0–3	0–1	2–0	2–0	0–2	4–2
(Italy) Atalanta	PAR (A)	BRU (H)	SLP (H)	MAR (A)	FRA (A)	CHE (H)	ATH (H)	USG (A)
(Italy) Atalanta	0–4	2–1	0–0	1–0	3–0	2–1	2–3	0–1
(Spain) Villarreal	TOT (A)	JUV (H)	MCI (H)	PAF (A)	DOR (A)	CPH (H)	AJX (H)	LEV (A)
(Spain) Villarreal	0–1	2–2	0–2	0–1	0–4	2–3	1–2	0–3
(Italy) Juventus	DOR (H)	VIL (A)	RMA (A)	SPO (H)	BOD (A)	PAF (H)	BEN (H)	MON (A)
(Italy) Juventus	4–4	2–2	0–1	1–1	3–2	2–0	2–0	0–0
(Germany) Eintracht Frankfurt	GAL (H)	ATM (A)	LIV (H)	NAP (A)	ATA (H)	BAR (A)	QRB (A)	TOT (H)
(Germany) Eintracht Frankfurt	5–1	1–5	1–5	0–0	0–3	1–2	2–3	0–2
(Belgium) Club Brugge	MON (H)	ATA (A)	BAY (A)	BAR (H)	SPO (A)	ARS (H)	KAI (A)	MAR (H)
(Belgium) Club Brugge	4–1	1–2	0–4	3–3	0–3	0–3	4–1	3–0

Results by Pot 3 team
Team	Matchday							
Team	1	2	3	4	5	6	7	8
(England) Tottenham Hotspur	VIL (H)	BOD (A)	MON (A)	CPH (H)	PAR (A)	SLP (H)	DOR (H)	FRA (A)
(England) Tottenham Hotspur	1–0	2–2	0–0	4–0	3–5	3–0	2–0	2–0
(Netherlands) PSV Eindhoven	USG (H)	LEV (A)	NAP (H)	OLY (A)	LIV (A)	ATM (H)	NEW (A)	BAY (H)
(Netherlands) PSV Eindhoven	1–3	1–1	6–2	1–1	4–1	2–3	0–3	1–2
(Netherlands) Ajax	INT (H)	MAR (A)	CHE (A)	GAL (H)	BEN (H)	QRB (A)	VIL (A)	OLY (H)
(Netherlands) Ajax	0–2	0–4	1–5	0–3	0–2	4–2	2–1	1–2
(Italy) Napoli	MCI (A)	SPO (H)	PSV (A)	FRA (H)	QRB (H)	BEN (A)	CPH (A)	CHE (H)
(Italy) Napoli	0–2	2–1	2–6	0–0	2–0	0–2	1–1	2–3
(Portugal) Sporting CP	KAI (H)	NAP (A)	MAR (H)	JUV (A)	BRU (H)	BAY (A)	PAR (H)	ATH (A)
(Portugal) Sporting CP	4–1	1–2	2–1	1–1	3–0	1–3	2–1	3–2
(Greece) Olympiacos	PAF (H)	ARS (A)	BAR (A)	PSV (H)	RMA (H)	KAI (A)	LEV (H)	AJX (A)
(Greece) Olympiacos	0–0	0–2	1–6	1–1	3–4	1–0	2–0	2–1
(Czech Republic) Slavia Prague	BOD (H)	INT (A)	ATA (A)	ARS (H)	ATH (H)	TOT (A)	BAR (H)	PAF (A)
(Czech Republic) Slavia Prague	2–2	0–3	0–0	0–3	0–0	0–3	2–4	1–4
(Norway) Bodø/Glimt	SLP (A)	TOT (H)	GAL (A)	MON (H)	JUV (H)	DOR (A)	MCI (H)	ATM (A)
(Norway) Bodø/Glimt	2–2	2–2	1–3	0–1	2–3	2–2	3–1	2–1
(France) Marseille	RMA (A)	AJX (H)	SPO (A)	ATA (H)	NEW (H)	USG (A)	LIV (H)	BRU (A)
(France) Marseille	1–2	4–0	1–2	0–1	2–1	3–2	0–3	0–3

Results by Pot 4 team
Team	Matchday							
Team	1	2	3	4	5	6	7	8
(Denmark) Copenhagen	LEV (H)	QRB (A)	DOR (H)	TOT (A)	KAI (H)	VIL (A)	NAP (H)	BAR (A)
(Denmark) Copenhagen	2–2	0–2	2–4	0–4	3–2	3–2	1–1	1–4
(France) Monaco	BRU (A)	MCI (H)	TOT (H)	BOD (A)	PAF (A)	GAL (H)	RMA (A)	JUV (H)
(France) Monaco	1–4	2–2	0–0	1–0	2–2	1–0	1–6	0–0
(Turkey) Galatasaray	FRA (A)	LIV (H)	BOD (H)	AJX (A)	USG (H)	MON (A)	ATM (H)	MCI (A)
(Turkey) Galatasaray	1–5	1–0	3–1	3–0	0–1	0–1	1–1	0–2
(Belgium) Union Saint-Gilloise	PSV (A)	NEW (H)	INT (H)	ATM (A)	GAL (A)	MAR (H)	BAY (A)	ATA (H)
(Belgium) Union Saint-Gilloise	3–1	0–4	0–4	1–3	1–0	2–3	0–2	1–0
(Azerbaijan) Qarabağ	BEN (A)	CPH (H)	ATH (A)	CHE (H)	NAP (A)	AJX (H)	FRA (H)	LIV (A)
(Azerbaijan) Qarabağ	3–2	2–0	1–3	2–2	0–2	2–4	3–2	0–6
(Spain) Athletic Bilbao	ARS (H)	DOR (A)	QRB (H)	NEW (A)	SLP (A)	PAR (H)	ATA (A)	SPO (H)
(Spain) Athletic Bilbao	0–2	1–4	3–1	0–2	0–0	0–0	3–2	2–3
(England) Newcastle United	BAR (H)	USG (A)	BEN (H)	ATH (H)	MAR (A)	LEV (A)	PSV (H)	PAR (A)
(England) Newcastle United	1–2	4–0	3–0	2–0	1–2	2–2	3–0	1–1
(Cyprus) Pafos	OLY (A)	BAY (H)	KAI (A)	VIL (H)	MON (H)	JUV (A)	CHE (A)	SLP (H)
(Cyprus) Pafos	0–0	1–5	0–0	1–0	2–2	0–2	0–1	4–1
(Kazakhstan) Kairat	SPO (A)	RMA (H)	PAF (H)	INT (A)	CPH (A)	OLY (H)	BRU (H)	ARS (A)
(Kazakhstan) Kairat	1–4	0–5	0–0	1–2	2–3	0–1	1–4	2–3

Source: UEFA
Scores and legend colours are listed from the perspective of the team in the "Team" column.
Legend: H = home, A = away. Green = win; Yellow = draw; Red = loss.

== Matches ==
The fixture list was announced on 30 August 2025, two days after the draw. This was to ensure no calendar clashes with teams in the Europa League and Conference League playing in the same cities.

In principle, each team did not play more than two home matches or two away matches in a row, and played one home match and one away match across both the first and last two matchdays. The matches were played on 16–18 September (exclusive week), (Note: As part of the scheduling for the 2025–26 UEFA men's club season, each competition had an "exclusive week" in the calendar, with no other competitions scheduled during this week. For the Champions League, this took place on matchday 1 (16–18 September 2025).) 30 September – 1 October, 21–22 October, 4–5 November, 25–26 November, 9–10 December 2025, 20–21 January and 28 January 2026. All matches were played on Tuesdays and Wednesdays, except for the competition's exclusive week, which also included Thursday fixtures. The scheduled kick-off times were generally 18:45 (two matches on each day) and 21:00 (remaining matches) CET/CEST. The only exception was the final matchday, where all fixtures were played simultaneously at 21:00.

Times are CET or CEST, (Note: CEST (UTC+2) for dates up to 25 October 2025 (matchdays 1–3), and CET (UTC+1) for dates thereafter (matchdays 4–8).) as listed by UEFA (local times, if different, are in parentheses).

=== Matchday 1 ===
16 September 2025
18:45

Athletic Bilbao (Royal Spanish Football Federation)	0–2	(The Football Association) Arsenal
	Report	Martinelli 72'; Trossard 87'

San Mamés, Bilbao
Attendance: 51,059
Referee: Donatas Rumšas (Lithuania)

16 September 2025
18:45

PSV Eindhoven (Royal Dutch Football Association)	1–3	(Royal Belgian Football Association) Union Saint-Gilloise
Van Bommel 90'	Report	David 9' (pen.); Ait El Hadj 39'; Mac Allister 81'

Philips Stadion, Eindhoven
Attendance: 35,000
Referee: Anthony Taylor (England)

16 September 2025
21:00

Juventus (Italian Football Federation)	4–4	(German Football Association) Borussia Dortmund
Yıldız 63'; Vlahović 67', 90+4'; Kelly 90+6'	Report	Adeyemi 52'; Nmecha 65'; Couto 74'; Bensebaini 86' (pen.)

Juventus Stadium, Turin
Attendance: 41,497
Referee: François Letexier (France)

16 September 2025
21:00

Real Madrid (Royal Spanish Football Federation)	2–1	(French Football Federation) Marseille
Mbappé 29' (pen.), 81' (pen.)	Report	Weah 22'

Santiago Bernabéu, Madrid
Attendance: 74,610
Referee: Irfan Peljto (Bosnia and Herzegovina)

16 September 2025
21:00 (20:00 UTC+1)

Benfica (Portuguese Football Federation)	2–3	(Association of Football Federations of Azerbaijan) Qarabağ
Barrenechea 6'; Pavlidis 16'	Report	Andrade 30'; Durán 48'; Kashchuk 86'

Estádio da Luz, Lisbon
Attendance: 53,257
Referee: Erik Lambrechts (Belgium)

16 September 2025
21:00 (20:00 UTC+1)

Tottenham Hotspur (The Football Association)	1–0	(Royal Spanish Football Federation) Villarreal
Luiz Júnior 4' (o.g.)	Report

Tottenham Hotspur Stadium, London
Attendance: 54,755
Referee: Rade Obrenović (Slovenia)

17 September 2025
18:45 (19:45 UTC+3)

Olympiacos (Hellenic Football Federation)	0–0	(Cyprus Football Association) Pafos
	Report

Karaiskakis Stadium, Piraeus
Attendance: 32,050
Referee: István Kovács (Romania)

17 September 2025
18:45

Slavia Prague (Football Association of the Czech Republic)	2–2	(Norwegian Football Federation) Bodø/Glimt
Mbodji 23', 74'	Report	Bassi 78'; Fet 90'

Fortuna Arena, Prague
Attendance: 18,922
Referee: Marian Barbu (Romania)

17 September 2025
21:00

Ajax (Royal Dutch Football Association)	0–2	(Italian Football Federation) Inter Milan
	Report	Thuram 42', 47'

Johan Cruyff Arena, Amsterdam
Attendance: 52,288
Referee: Michael Oliver (England)

17 September 2025
21:00

Bayern Munich (German Football Association)	3–1	(The Football Association) Chelsea
Chalobah 20' (o.g.); Kane 27' (pen.), 63'	Report	Palmer 29'

Allianz Arena, Munich
Attendance: 75,000
Referee: José María Sánchez Martínez (Spain)

17 September 2025
21:00 (20:00 UTC+1)

Liverpool (The Football Association)	3–2	(Royal Spanish Football Federation) Atlético Madrid
Robertson 4'; Salah 6'; Van Dijk 90+2'	Report	Llorente 45+3', 81'

Anfield, Liverpool
Attendance: 59,507
Referee: Maurizio Mariani (Italy)

17 September 2025
21:00

Paris Saint-Germain (French Football Federation)	4–0	(Italian Football Federation) Atalanta
Marquinhos 3'; Kvaratskhelia 39'; Mendes 51'; Ramos 90+1'	Report

Parc des Princes, Paris
Attendance: 47,151
Referee: Sandro Schärer (Switzerland)

18 September 2025
18:45

Club Brugge (Royal Belgian Football Association)	4–1	(French Football Federation) Monaco
Tresoldi 32'; Onyedika 39'; Vanaken 42'; Diakhon 75'	Report	Fati 90+1'

Jan Breydel Stadium, Bruges
Attendance: 25,007
Referee: Simone Sozza (Italy)

18 September 2025
18:45

Copenhagen (Danish Football Association)	2–2	(German Football Association) Bayer Leverkusen
Larsson 9'; Robert 87'	Report	Grimaldo 82'; Hatzidiakos 90+1' (o.g.)

Parken Stadium, Copenhagen
Attendance: 34,504
Referee: Aliyar Aghayev (Azerbaijan)

18 September 2025
21:00

Eintracht Frankfurt (German Football Association)	5–1	(Turkish Football Federation) Galatasaray
Sánchez 37' (o.g.); Uzun 45+2'; Singo 45+4' (o.g.); Burkardt 66'; Knauff 75'	Report	Akgün 8'

Waldstadion, Frankfurt
Attendance: 58,700
Referee: Marco Guida (Italy)

18 September 2025
21:00 (20:00 UTC+1)

Manchester City (The Football Association)	2–0	(Italian Football Federation) Napoli
Haaland 56'; Doku 65'	Report

City of Manchester Stadium, Manchester
Attendance: 49,531
Referee: Felix Zwayer (Germany)

18 September 2025
21:00 (20:00 UTC+1)

Newcastle United (The Football Association)	1–2	(Royal Spanish Football Federation) Barcelona
Gordon 90'	Report	Rashford 58', 67'

St James' Park, Newcastle upon Tyne
Attendance: 52,084
Referee: Glenn Nyberg (Sweden)

18 September 2025
21:00 (20:00 UTC+1)

Sporting CP (Portuguese Football Federation)	4–1	(Kazakhstan Football Federation) Kairat
Trincão 44', 65'; Alisson 67'; Quenda 68'	Report	Edmilson 86'

Estádio José Alvalade, Lisbon
Attendance: 38,696
Referee: Damian Sylwestrzak (Poland)

=== Matchday 2 ===
30 September 2025
18:45

Atalanta (Italian Football Federation)	2–1	(Royal Belgian Football Association) Club Brugge
Samardžić 74' (pen.); Pašalić 87'	Report	Tzolis 38'

Stadio Atleti Azzurri d'Italia, Bergamo
Attendance: 21,950
Referee: Espen Eskås (Norway)

30 September 2025
18:45 (21:45 UTC+5)

Kairat (Kazakhstan Football Federation)	0–5	(Royal Spanish Football Federation) Real Madrid
	Report	Mbappé 25' (pen.), 52', 73'; Camavinga 83'; Brahim 90+3'

Central Stadium, Almaty
Attendance: 22,788
Referee: Marco Guida (Italy)

30 September 2025
21:00

Atlético Madrid (Royal Spanish Football Federation)	5–1	(German Football Association) Eintracht Frankfurt
Raspadori 4'; Le Normand 33'; Griezmann 45+1'; Simeone 70'; Alvarez 82' (pen.)	Report	Burkardt 57'

Metropolitano Stadium, Madrid
Attendance: 59,401
Referee: Slavko Vinčić (Slovenia)

30 September 2025
21:00 (20:00 UTC+1)

Chelsea (The Football Association)	1–0	(Portuguese Football Federation) Benfica
Ríos 18' (o.g.)	Report

Stamford Bridge, London
Attendance: 38,636
Referee: Daniel Siebert (Germany)

30 September 2025
21:00

Inter Milan (Italian Football Federation)	3–0	(Football Association of the Czech Republic) Slavia Prague
L. Martínez 30', 65'; Dumfries 34'	Report

San Siro, Milan
Attendance: 62,317
Referee: Chris Kavanagh (England)

30 September 2025
21:00

Bodø/Glimt (Norwegian Football Federation)	2–2	(The Football Association) Tottenham Hotspur
Hauge 53', 66'	Report	Van de Ven 68'; Gundersen 89' (o.g.)

Aspmyra Stadion, Bodø
Attendance: 7,988
Referee: Ivan Kružliak (Slovakia)

30 September 2025
21:00 (22:00 UTC+3)

Galatasaray (Turkish Football Federation)	1–0	(The Football Association) Liverpool
Osimhen 16' (pen.)	Report

Rams Park, Istanbul
Attendance: 50,651
Referee: Clément Turpin (France)

30 September 2025
21:00

Marseille (French Football Federation)	4–0	(Royal Dutch Football Association) Ajax
Paixão 6', 12'; Greenwood 26'; Aubameyang 52'	Report

Stade Vélodrome, Marseille
Attendance: 65,771
Referee: Anthony Taylor (England)

30 September 2025
21:00 (22:00 UTC+3)

Pafos (Cyprus Football Association)	1–5	(German Football Association) Bayern Munich
Oršić 45'	Report	Kane 15', 34'; Guerreiro 20'; Jackson 31'; Olise 68'

Alphamega Stadium, Limassol (Note: Pafos played their home matches at Alphamega Stadium, Limassol, instead of their regular stadium, Stelios Kyriakides Stadium, Paphos, which did not meet UEFA requirements.)
Attendance: 9,187
Referee: Manfredas Lukjančukas (Lithuania)

1 October 2025
18:45 (20:45 UTC+4)

Qarabağ (Association of Football Federations of Azerbaijan)	2–0	(Danish Football Association) Copenhagen
Zoubir 28'; Addai 83'	Report

Tofiq Bahramov Republican Stadium, Baku
Attendance: 30,250
Referee: Serdar Gözübüyük (Netherlands)

1 October 2025
18:45

Union Saint-Gilloise (Royal Belgian Football Association)	0–4	(The Football Association) Newcastle United
	Report	Woltemade 17'; Gordon 43' (pen.), 64' (pen.); Barnes 80'

Constant Vanden Stock Stadium, Brussels (Note: Union Saint-Gilloise played their home matches at Constant Vanden Stock Stadium, Brussels, instead of their regular stadium, Joseph Marien Stadium, Brussels, which did not meet UEFA requirements.)
Attendance: 16,038
Referee: Urs Schnyder (Switzerland)

1 October 2025
21:00 (20:00 UTC+1)

Arsenal (The Football Association)	2–0	(Hellenic Football Federation) Olympiacos
Martinelli 12'; Saka 90+2'	Report

Emirates Stadium, London
Attendance: 56,820
Referee: François Letexier (France)

1 October 2025
21:00

Monaco (French Football Federation)	2–2	(The Football Association) Manchester City
Teze 18'; Dier 90' (pen.)	Report	Haaland 15', 44'

Stade Louis II, Monaco
Attendance: 11,275
Referee: Jesús Gil Manzano (Spain)

1 October 2025
21:00

Bayer Leverkusen (German Football Association)	1–1	(Royal Dutch Football Association) PSV Eindhoven
Kofane 65'	Report	Saibari 72'

BayArena, Leverkusen
Attendance: 30,210
Referee: Glenn Nyberg (Sweden)

1 October 2025
21:00

Borussia Dortmund (German Football Association)	4–1	(Royal Spanish Football Federation) Athletic Bilbao
Svensson 28'; Chukwuemeka 50'; Guirassy 82'; Brandt 90+1'	Report	Guruzeta 61'

Westfalenstadion, Dortmund
Attendance: 81,365
Referee: Szymon Marciniak (Poland)

1 October 2025
21:00

Barcelona (Royal Spanish Football Federation)	1–2	(French Football Federation) Paris Saint-Germain
Torres 19'	Report	Mayulu 38'; Ramos 90'

Estadi Olímpic Lluís Companys, Barcelona (Note: Barcelona played their two first home matches at Estadi Olímpic Lluís Companys, Barcelona, instead of their regular stadium, Camp Nou, Barcelona, which was being renovated.)
Attendance: 50,207
Referee: Michael Oliver (England)

1 October 2025
21:00

Napoli (Italian Football Federation)	2–1	(Portuguese Football Federation) Sporting CP
Højlund 36', 79'	Report	Suárez 62' (pen.)

Stadio Diego Armando Maradona, Naples
Attendance: 47,364
Referee: Danny Makkelie (Netherlands)

1 October 2025
21:00

Villarreal (Royal Spanish Football Federation)	2–2	(Italian Football Federation) Juventus
Mikautadze 18'; Veiga 90'	Report	Gatti 49'; Conceição 56'

Estadio de la Cerámica, Villarreal
Attendance: 20,087
Referee: István Kovács (Romania)

=== Matchday 3 ===
21 October 2025
18:45

Barcelona (Royal Spanish Football Federation)	6–1	(Hellenic Football Federation) Olympiacos
López 7', 39', 76'; Yamal 68' (pen.); Rashford 74', 79'	Report	El Kaabi 54' (pen.)

Estadi Olímpic Lluís Companys, Barcelona
Attendance: 46,264
Referee: Urs Schnyder (Switzerland)

21 October 2025
18:45 (21:45 UTC+5)

Kairat (Kazakhstan Football Federation)	0–0	(Cyprus Football Association) Pafos
	Report

Central Stadium, Almaty
Attendance: 16,478
Referee: Chris Kavanagh (England)

21 October 2025
21:00 (20:00 UTC+1)

Arsenal (The Football Association)	4–0	(Royal Spanish Football Federation) Atlético Madrid
Gabriel 57'; Martinelli 64'; Gyökeres 67', 70'	Report

Emirates Stadium, London
Attendance: 59,200
Referee: Davide Massa (Italy)

21 October 2025
21:00

Bayer Leverkusen (German Football Association)	2–7	(French Football Federation) Paris Saint-Germain
García 38' (pen.), 54'	Report	Pacho 7'; Doué 41', 45+3'; Kvaratskhelia 44'; Mendes 50'; Dembélé 66'; Vitinha 90'

BayArena, Leverkusen
Attendance: 30,210
Referee: Jesús Gil Manzano (Spain)

21 October 2025
21:00

Copenhagen (Danish Football Association)	2–4	(German Football Association) Borussia Dortmund
Anton 33' (o.g.); Daðason 90'	Report	Nmecha 20', 76'; Bensebaini 61' (pen.); Silva 87'

Parken Stadium, Copenhagen
Attendance: 35,058
Referee: Danny Makkelie (Netherlands)

21 October 2025
21:00 (20:00 UTC+1)

Newcastle United (The Football Association)	3–0	(Portuguese Football Federation) Benfica
Gordon 32'; Barnes 70', 83'	Report

St James' Park, Newcastle upon Tyne
Attendance: 52,073
Referee: Szymon Marciniak (Poland)

21 October 2025
21:00

PSV Eindhoven (Royal Dutch Football Association)	6–2	(Italian Football Federation) Napoli
Buongiorno 35' (o.g.); Saibari 38'; Man 54', 80'; Pepi 87'; Driouech 89'	Report	McTominay 31', 86'

Philips Stadion, Eindhoven
Attendance: 34,700
Referee: Daniel Siebert (Germany)

21 October 2025
21:00

Union Saint-Gilloise (Royal Belgian Football Association)	0–4	(Italian Football Federation) Inter Milan
	Report	Dumfries 41'; L. Martínez 45+1'; Çalhanoğlu 53' (pen.); Esposito 76'

Constant Vanden Stock Stadium, Brussels
Attendance: 16,632
Referee: Glenn Nyberg (Sweden)

21 October 2025
21:00

Villarreal (Royal Spanish Football Federation)	0–2	(The Football Association) Manchester City
	Report	Haaland 17'; Silva 40'

Estadio de la Cerámica, Villarreal
Attendance: 20,539
Referee: Serdar Gözübüyük (Netherlands)

22 October 2025
18:45

Athletic Bilbao (Royal Spanish Football Federation)	3–1	(Association of Football Federations of Azerbaijan) Qarabağ
Guruzeta 40', 88'; Navarro 70'	Report	Andrade 1'

San Mamés, Bilbao
Attendance: 50,471
Referee: Igor Pajač (Croatia)

22 October 2025
18:45 (19:45 UTC+3)

Galatasaray (Turkish Football Federation)	3–1	(Norwegian Football Federation) Bodø/Glimt
Osimhen 3', 33'; Akgün 60'	Report	Helmersen 75'

Rams Park, Istanbul
Attendance: 45,275
Referee: Michael Oliver (England)

22 October 2025
21:00

Monaco (French Football Federation)	0–0	(The Football Association) Tottenham Hotspur
	Report

Stade Louis II, Monaco
Attendance: 11,365
Referee: Marco Guida (Italy)

22 October 2025
21:00

Atalanta (Italian Football Federation)	0–0	(Football Association of the Czech Republic) Slavia Prague
	Report

Stadio Atleti Azzurri d'Italia, Bergamo
Attendance: 22,152
Referee: Ricardo de Burgos Bengoetxea (Spain)

22 October 2025
21:00 (20:00 UTC+1)

Chelsea (The Football Association)	5–1	(Royal Dutch Football Association) Ajax
Guiu 18'; Caicedo 27'; Fernández 45' (pen.); Estêvão 45+6' (pen.); George 48'	Report	Weghorst 33' (pen.)

Stamford Bridge, London
Attendance: 38,947
Referee: Felix Zwayer (Germany)

22 October 2025
21:00

Eintracht Frankfurt (German Football Association)	1–5	(The Football Association) Liverpool
Kristensen 26'	Report	Ekitike 35'; Van Dijk 39'; Konaté 44'; Gakpo 66'; Szoboszlai 70'

Waldstadion, Frankfurt
Attendance: 58,700
Referee: François Letexier (France)

22 October 2025
21:00

Bayern Munich (German Football Association)	4–0	(Royal Belgian Football Association) Club Brugge
Karl 5'; Kane 14'; Díaz 34'; Jackson 79'	Report

Allianz Arena, Munich
Attendance: 75,000
Referee: Donatas Rumšas (Lithuania)

22 October 2025
21:00

Real Madrid (Royal Spanish Football Federation)	1–0	(Italian Football Federation) Juventus
Bellingham 57'	Report

Santiago Bernabéu, Madrid
Attendance: 76,521
Referee: Slavko Vinčić (Slovenia)

22 October 2025
21:00 (20:00 UTC+1)

Sporting CP (Portuguese Football Federation)	2–1	(French Football Federation) Marseille
Catamo 69'; Alisson 86'	Report	Paixão 14'

Estádio José Alvalade, Lisbon
Attendance: 46,766
Referee: Rade Obrenović (Slovenia)

=== Matchday 4 ===
4 November 2025
18:45

Slavia Prague (Football Association of the Czech Republic)	0–3	(The Football Association) Arsenal
	Report	Saka 32' (pen.); Merino 46', 68'

Fortuna Arena, Prague
Attendance: 19,222
Referee: Aliyar Aghayev (Azerbaijan)

4 November 2025
18:45

Napoli (Italian Football Federation)	0–0	(German Football Association) Eintracht Frankfurt
	Report

Stadio Diego Armando Maradona, Naples
Attendance: 45,840
Referee: João Pinheiro (Portugal)

4 November 2025
21:00

Atlético Madrid (Royal Spanish Football Federation)	3–1	(Royal Belgian Football Association) Union Saint-Gilloise
Alvarez 39'; Gallagher 72'; Llorente 90+6'	Report	Sykes 80'

Metropolitano Stadium, Madrid
Attendance: 59,347
Referee: Espen Eskås (Norway)

4 November 2025
21:00

Bodø/Glimt (Norwegian Football Federation)	0–1	(French Football Federation) Monaco
	Report	Balogun 43'

Aspmyra Stadion, Bodø
Attendance: 7,842
Referee: Damian Sylwestrzak (Poland)

4 November 2025
21:00

Juventus (Italian Football Federation)	1–1	(Portuguese Football Federation) Sporting CP
Vlahović 34'	Report	Araújo 12'

Juventus Stadium, Turin
Attendance: 40,729
Referee: Daniel Siebert (Germany)

4 November 2025
21:00 (20:00 UTC+0)

Liverpool (The Football Association)	1–0	(Royal Spanish Football Federation) Real Madrid
Mac Allister 61'	Report

Anfield, Liverpool
Attendance: 59,916
Referee: István Kovács (Romania)

4 November 2025
21:00 (22:00 UTC+2)

Olympiacos (Hellenic Football Federation)	1–1	(Royal Dutch Football Association) PSV Eindhoven
Martins 17'	Report	Pepi 90+3'

Karaiskakis Stadium, Piraeus
Attendance: 32,570
Referee: Clément Turpin (France)

4 November 2025
21:00

Paris Saint-Germain (French Football Federation)	1–2	(German Football Association) Bayern Munich
Neves 74'	Report	Díaz 4', 32'

Parc des Princes, Paris
Attendance: 45,747
Referee: Maurizio Mariani (Italy)

4 November 2025
21:00 (20:00 UTC+0)

Tottenham Hotspur (The Football Association)	4–0	(Danish Football Association) Copenhagen
Johnson 19'; Odobert 51'; Van de Ven 64'; Palhinha 67'	Report

Tottenham Hotspur Stadium, London
Attendance: 49,565
Referee: Erik Lambrechts (Belgium)

5 November 2025
18:45 (19:45 UTC+2)

Pafos (Cyprus Football Association)	1–0	(Royal Spanish Football Federation) Villarreal
Luckassen 46'	Report

Alphamega Stadium, Limassol
Attendance: 6,314
Referee: Sven Jablonski (Germany)

5 November 2025
18:45 (21:45 UTC+4)

Qarabağ (Association of Football Federations of Azerbaijan)	2–2	(The Football Association) Chelsea
Andrade 29'; Janković 39' (pen.)	Report	Estêvão 16'; Garnacho 53'

Tofiq Bahramov Republican Stadium, Baku
Attendance: 30,887
Referee: Sebastian Gishamer (Austria)

5 November 2025
21:00

Ajax (Royal Dutch Football Association)	0–3	(Turkish Football Federation) Galatasaray
	Report	Osimhen 59', 66' (pen.), 78' (pen.)

Johan Cruyff Arena, Amsterdam
Attendance: 51,000
Referee: Benoît Bastien (France)

5 November 2025
21:00

Club Brugge (Royal Belgian Football Association)	3–3	(Royal Spanish Football Federation) Barcelona
Tresoldi 6'; Forbs 17', 63'	Report	Torres 8'; Yamal 61'; Tzolis 77' (o.g.)

Jan Breydel Stadium, Bruges
Attendance: 27,037
Referee: Anthony Taylor (England)

5 November 2025
21:00

Inter Milan (Italian Football Federation)	2–1	(Kazakhstan Football Federation) Kairat
L. Martínez 45'; Carlos Augusto 67'	Report	Arad 55'

San Siro, Milan
Attendance: 69,983
Referee: Luis Godinho (Portugal)

5 November 2025
21:00 (20:00 UTC+0)

Manchester City (The Football Association)	4–1	(German Football Association) Borussia Dortmund
Foden 22', 57'; Haaland 29'; Cherki 90+1'	Report	Anton 72'

City of Manchester Stadium, Manchester
Attendance: 50,513
Referee: Szymon Marciniak (Poland)

5 November 2025
21:00 (20:00 UTC+0)

Newcastle United (The Football Association)	2–0	(Royal Spanish Football Federation) Athletic Bilbao
Burn 11'; Joelinton 49'	Report

St James' Park, Newcastle upon Tyne
Attendance: 51,923
Referee: Ivan Kružliak (Slovakia)

5 November 2025
21:00

Marseille (French Football Federation)	0–1	(Italian Football Federation) Atalanta
	Report	Samardžić 90'

Stade Vélodrome, Marseille
Attendance: 64,319
Referee: José María Sánchez Martínez (Spain)

5 November 2025
21:00 (20:00 UTC+0)

Benfica (Portuguese Football Federation)	0–1	(German Football Association) Bayer Leverkusen
	Report	Schick 65'

Estádio da Luz, Lisbon
Attendance: 55,796
Referee: Simone Sozza (Italy)

=== Matchday 5 ===
25 November 2025
18:45

Ajax (Royal Dutch Football Association)	0–2	(Portuguese Football Federation) Benfica
	Report	Dahl 6'; Barreiro 90'

Johan Cruyff Arena, Amsterdam
Attendance: 51,154
Referee: Sven Jablonski (Germany)

25 November 2025
18:45 (20:45 UTC+3)

Galatasaray (Turkish Football Federation)	0–1	(Royal Belgian Football Association) Union Saint-Gilloise
	Report	David 57'

Rams Park, Istanbul
Attendance: 45,444
Referee: José María Sánchez Martínez (Spain)

25 November 2025
21:00

Borussia Dortmund (German Football Association)	4–0	(Royal Spanish Football Federation) Villarreal
Guirassy 45+2', 54'; Adeyemi 58'; Svensson 90+5'	Report

Westfalenstadion, Dortmund
Attendance: 81,365
Referee: Davide Massa (Italy)

25 November 2025
21:00 (20:00 UTC+0)

Chelsea (The Football Association)	3–0	(Royal Spanish Football Federation) Barcelona
Koundé 27' (o.g.); Estêvão 55'; Delap 73'	Report

Stamford Bridge, London
Attendance: 39,323
Referee: Slavko Vinčić (Slovenia)

25 November 2025
21:00

Bodø/Glimt (Norwegian Football Federation)	2–3	(Italian Football Federation) Juventus
Blomberg 27'; Fet 87' (pen.)	Report	Openda 48'; McKennie 59'; David 90+1'

Aspmyra Stadion, Bodø
Attendance: 7,824
Referee: Danny Makkelie (Netherlands)

25 November 2025
21:00 (20:00 UTC+0)

Manchester City (The Football Association)	0–2	(German Football Association) Bayer Leverkusen
	Report	Grimaldo 23'; Schick 54'

City of Manchester Stadium, Manchester
Attendance: 50,592
Referee: João Pinheiro (Portugal)

25 November 2025
21:00

Marseille (French Football Federation)	2–1	(The Football Association) Newcastle United
Aubameyang 46', 50'	Report	Barnes 6'

Stade Vélodrome, Marseille
Attendance: 64,521
Referee: Maurizio Mariani (Italy)

25 November 2025
21:00

Slavia Prague (Football Association of the Czech Republic)	0–0	(Royal Spanish Football Federation) Athletic Bilbao
	Report

Fortuna Arena, Prague
Attendance: 19,169
Referee: Donatas Rumšas (Lithuania)

25 November 2025
21:00

Napoli (Italian Football Federation)	2–0	(Association of Football Federations of Azerbaijan) Qarabağ
McTominay 65'; Janković 72' (o.g.)	Report

Stadio Diego Armando Maradona, Naples
Attendance: 32,019
Referee: Szymon Marciniak (Poland)

26 November 2025
18:45

Copenhagen (Danish Football Association)	3–2	(Kazakhstan Football Federation) Kairat
Daðason 26'; Larsson 59' (pen.); Robert 73'	Report	Satpayev 81'; Baybek 90'

Parken Stadium, Copenhagen
Attendance: 30,231
Referee: Nick Walsh (Scotland)

26 November 2025
18:45 (19:45 UTC+2)

Pafos (Cyprus Football Association)	2–2	(French Football Federation) Monaco
David Luiz 18'; Salisu 88' (o.g.)	Report	Minamino 5'; Balogun 26'

Alphamega Stadium, Limassol
Attendance: 8,347
Referee: Ivan Kružliak (Slovakia)

26 November 2025
21:00 (20:00 UTC+0)

Arsenal (The Football Association)	3–1	(German Football Association) Bayern Munich
Timber 22'; Madueke 69'; Martinelli 77'	Report	Karl 32'

Emirates Stadium, London
Attendance: 58,780
Referee: Marco Guida (Italy)

26 November 2025
21:00

Atlético Madrid (Royal Spanish Football Federation)	2–1	(Italian Football Federation) Inter Milan
Alvarez 9'; Giménez 90+3'	Report	Zieliński 54'

Metropolitano Stadium, Madrid
Attendance: 68,069
Referee: François Letexier (France)

26 November 2025
21:00

Eintracht Frankfurt (German Football Association)	0–3	(Italian Football Federation) Atalanta
	Report	Lookman 60'; Éderson 62'; De Ketelaere 65'

Waldstadion, Frankfurt
Attendance: 59,500
Referee: Chris Kavanagh (England)

26 November 2025
21:00 (20:00 UTC+0)

Liverpool (The Football Association)	1–4	(Royal Dutch Football Association) PSV Eindhoven
Szoboszlai 16'	Report	Perišić 6' (pen.); Til 56'; Driouech 73', 90+1'

Anfield, Liverpool
Attendance: 59,964
Referee: Alejandro Hernández Hernández (Spain)

26 November 2025
21:00 (22:00 UTC+2)

Olympiacos (Hellenic Football Federation)	3–4	(Royal Spanish Football Federation) Real Madrid
Chiquinho 8'; Taremi 52'; El Kaabi 81'	Report	Mbappé 22', 24', 29', 60'

Karaiskakis Stadium, Piraeus
Attendance: 32,325
Referee: Michael Oliver (England)

26 November 2025
21:00

Paris Saint-Germain (French Football Federation)	5–3	(The Football Association) Tottenham Hotspur
Vitinha 45', 53', 76' (pen.); Fabián 59'; Pacho 65'	Report	Richarlison 35'; Kolo Muani 50', 73'

Parc des Princes, Paris
Attendance: 47,574
Referee: Felix Zwayer (Germany)

26 November 2025
21:00 (20:00 UTC+0)

Sporting CP (Portuguese Football Federation)	3–0	(Royal Belgian Football Association) Club Brugge
Quenda 24'; Suárez 31'; Trincão 70'	Report

Estádio José Alvalade, Lisbon
Attendance: 41,634
Referee: Tobias Stieler (Germany)

=== Matchday 6 ===
9 December 2025
16:30 (20:30 UTC+5)

Kairat (Kazakhstan Football Federation)	0–1	(Hellenic Football Federation) Olympiacos
	Report	Martins 73'

Astana Arena, Astana (Note: Kairat played their last two league phase matches at Astana Arena, Astana, instead of their regular stadium, Central Stadium, Almaty, due to extreme winter weather conditions.)
Attendance: 19,463
Referee: Juan Martínez Munuera (Spain)

9 December 2025
18:45

Bayern Munich (German Football Association)	3–1	(Portuguese Football Federation) Sporting CP
Gnabry 65'; Karl 69'; Tah 77'	Report	Kimmich 54' (o.g.)

Allianz Arena, Munich
Attendance: 75,000
Referee: Nick Walsh (Scotland)

9 December 2025
21:00

Monaco (French Football Federation)	1–0	(Turkish Football Federation) Galatasaray
Balogun 68'	Report

Stade Louis II, Monaco
Attendance: 9,887
Referee: Danny Makkelie (Netherlands)

9 December 2025
21:00

Atalanta (Italian Football Federation)	2–1	(The Football Association) Chelsea
Scamacca 55'; De Ketelaere 83'	Report	João Pedro 25'

Stadio Atleti Azzurri d'Italia, Bergamo
Attendance: 20,685
Referee: Alejandro Hernández Hernández (Spain)

9 December 2025
21:00

Barcelona (Royal Spanish Football Federation)	2–1	(German Football Association) Eintracht Frankfurt
Koundé 50', 53'	Report	Knauff 21'

Camp Nou, Barcelona
Attendance: 38,439
Referee: Davide Massa (Italy)

9 December 2025
21:00

Inter Milan (Italian Football Federation)	0–1	(The Football Association) Liverpool
	Report	Szoboszlai 88' (pen.)

San Siro, Milan
Attendance: 73,892
Referee: Felix Zwayer (Germany)

9 December 2025
21:00

PSV Eindhoven (Royal Dutch Football Association)	2–3	(Royal Spanish Football Federation) Atlético Madrid
Til 10'; Pepi 85'	Report	Alvarez 37'; Hancko 52'; Sørloth 56'

Philips Stadion, Eindhoven
Attendance: 34,800
Referee: Michael Oliver (England)

9 December 2025
21:00

Union Saint-Gilloise (Royal Belgian Football Association)	2–3	(French Football Federation) Marseille
Khalaily 5', 71'	Report	Paixão 15'; Greenwood 41', 58'

Constant Vanden Stock Stadium, Brussels
Attendance: 16,214
Referee: João Pinheiro (Portugal)

9 December 2025
21:00 (20:00 UTC+0)

Tottenham Hotspur (The Football Association)	3–0	(Football Association of the Czech Republic) Slavia Prague
Zima 26' (o.g.); Kudus 50' (pen.); Simons 79' (pen.)	Report

Tottenham Hotspur Stadium, London
Attendance: 47,281
Referee: Benoît Bastien (France)

10 December 2025
18:45 (21:45 UTC+4)

Qarabağ (Association of Football Federations of Azerbaijan)	2–4	(Royal Dutch Football Association) Ajax
Durán 10'; Silva 47'	Report	Dolberg 39'; Gloukh 79', 90'; Gaaei 83'

Tofiq Bahramov Republican Stadium, Baku
Attendance: 31,090
Referee: Rade Obrenović (Slovenia)

10 December 2025
18:45

Villarreal (Royal Spanish Football Federation)	2–3	(Danish Football Association) Copenhagen
Comesaña 47'; Oluwaseyi 56'	Report	Elyounoussi 2'; Achouri 48'; Cornelius 90'

Estadio de la Cerámica, Villarreal
Attendance: 17,023
Referee: Ivan Kružliak (Slovakia)

10 December 2025
21:00

Athletic Bilbao (Royal Spanish Football Federation)	0–0	(French Football Federation) Paris Saint-Germain
	Report

San Mamés, Bilbao
Attendance: 51,772
Referee: Daniel Siebert (Germany)

10 December 2025
21:00

Bayer Leverkusen (German Football Association)	2–2	(The Football Association) Newcastle United
Bruno Guimarães 13' (o.g.); Grimaldo 88'	Report	Gordon 51' (pen.); Miley 74'

BayArena, Leverkusen
Attendance: 30,210
Referee: Serdar Gözübüyük (Netherlands)

10 December 2025
21:00

Borussia Dortmund (German Football Association)	2–2	(Norwegian Football Federation) Bodø/Glimt
Brandt 18', 51'	Report	Aleesami 42'; Hauge 75'

Westfalenstadion, Dortmund
Attendance: 81,365
Referee: Erik Lambrechts (Belgium)

10 December 2025
21:00

Club Brugge (Royal Belgian Football Association)	0–3	(The Football Association) Arsenal
	Report	Madueke 25', 47'; Martinelli 56'

Jan Breydel Stadium, Bruges
Attendance: 26,464
Referee: Sven Jablonski (Germany)

10 December 2025
21:00

Juventus (Italian Football Federation)	2–0	(Cyprus Football Association) Pafos
McKennie 67'; David 73'	Report

Juventus Stadium, Turin
Attendance: 40,336
Referee: Jesús Gil Manzano (Spain)

10 December 2025
21:00

Real Madrid (Royal Spanish Football Federation)	1–2	(The Football Association) Manchester City
Rodrygo 28'	Report	O'Reilly 35'; Haaland 43' (pen.)

Bernabéu, Madrid
Attendance: 76,977
Referee: Clément Turpin (France)

10 December 2025
21:00 (20:00 UTC+0)

Benfica (Portuguese Football Federation)	2–0	(Italian Football Federation) Napoli
Ríos 20'; Barreiro 49'	Report

Estádio da Luz, Lisbon
Attendance: 54,353
Referee: Slavko Vinčić (Slovenia)

=== Matchday 7 ===
20 January 2026
16:30 (20:30 UTC+5)

Kairat (Kazakhstan Football Federation)	1–4	(Royal Belgian Football Association) Club Brugge
Sadybekov 90+2'	Report	Stanković 32'; Vanaken 38'; Vermant 74'; Mechele 84'

Astana Arena, Astana
Attendance: 11,324
Referee: Donatas Rumšas (Lithuania)

20 January 2026
18:45

Bodø/Glimt (Norwegian Football Federation)	3–1	(The Football Association) Manchester City
Høgh 22', 24'; Hauge 58'	Report	Cherki 60'

Aspmyra Stadion, Bodø
Attendance: 8,016
Referee: Sven Jablonski (Germany)

20 January 2026
21:00

Copenhagen (Danish Football Association)	1–1	(Italian Football Federation) Napoli
Larsson 72'	Report	McTominay 39'

Parken Stadium, Copenhagen
Attendance: 35,022
Referee: Irfan Peljto (Bosnia and Herzegovina)

20 January 2026
21:00

Inter Milan (Italian Football Federation)	1–3	(The Football Association) Arsenal
Sučić 18'	Report	Gabriel Jesus 10', 31'; Gyökeres 84'

San Siro, Milan
Attendance: 72,649
Referee: João Pinheiro (Portugal)

20 January 2026
21:00 (22:00 UTC+2)

Olympiacos (Hellenic Football Federation)	2–0	(German Football Association) Bayer Leverkusen
Costinha 2'; Taremi 45+1'	Report

Karaiskakis Stadium, Piraeus
Attendance: 32,400
Referee: Maurizio Mariani (Italy)

20 January 2026
21:00

Real Madrid (Royal Spanish Football Federation)	6–1	(French Football Federation) Monaco
Mbappé 5', 26'; Mastantuono 51'; Kehrer 55' (o.g.); Vinícius 63'; Bellingham 80'	Report	Teze 72'

Bernabéu, Madrid
Attendance: 73,599
Referee: Espen Eskås (Norway)

20 January 2026
21:00 (20:00 UTC+0)

Sporting CP (Portuguese Football Federation)	2–1	(French Football Federation) Paris Saint-Germain
Suárez 74', 90'	Report	Kvaratskhelia 79'

Estádio José Alvalade, Lisbon
Attendance: 51,428
Referee: Anthony Taylor (England)

20 January 2026
21:00 (20:00 UTC+0)

Tottenham Hotspur (The Football Association)	2–0	(German Football Association) Borussia Dortmund
Romero 14'; Solanke 37'	Report

Tottenham Hotspur Stadium, London
Attendance: 52,713
Referee: Glenn Nyberg (Sweden)

20 January 2026
21:00

Villarreal (Royal Spanish Football Federation)	1–2	(Royal Dutch Football Association) Ajax
Oluwaseyi 49'	Report	Gloukh 61'; Edvardsen 90'

Estadio de la Cerámica, Villarreal
Attendance: 14,023
Referee: Nick Walsh (Scotland)

21 January 2026
18:45 (20:45 UTC+3)

Galatasaray (Turkish Football Federation)	1–1	(Royal Spanish Football Federation) Atlético Madrid
Llorente 20' (o.g.)	Report	Simeone 4'

Rams Park, Istanbul
Attendance: 48,443
Referee: István Kovács (Romania)

21 January 2026
18:45 (21:45 UTC+4)

Qarabağ (Association of Football Federations of Azerbaijan)	3–2	(German Football Association) Eintracht Frankfurt
Durán 4', 80'; Mustafazade 90+4'	Report	Uzun 10'; Chaïbi 78' (pen.)

Tofiq Bahramov Republican Stadium, Baku
Attendance: 27,820
Referee: Sandro Schärer (Switzerland)

21 January 2026
21:00

Atalanta (Italian Football Federation)	2–3	(Royal Spanish Football Federation) Athletic Bilbao
Scamacca 16'; Krstović 88'	Report	Guruzeta 58'; Serrano 70'; Navarro 74'

Stadio Atleti Azzurri d'Italia, Bergamo
Attendance: 21,462
Referee: Danny Makkelie (Netherlands)

21 January 2026
21:00 (20:00 UTC+0)

Chelsea (The Football Association)	1–0	(Cyprus Football Association) Pafos
Caicedo 78'	Report

Stamford Bridge, London
Attendance: 30,774
Referee: Erik Lambrechts (Belgium)

21 January 2026
21:00

Bayern Munich (German Football Association)	2–0	(Royal Belgian Football Association) Union Saint-Gilloise
Kane 52', 55' (pen.)	Report

Allianz Arena, Munich
Attendance: 66,000
Referee: Rade Obrenović (Slovenia)

21 January 2026
21:00

Juventus (Italian Football Federation)	2–0	(Portuguese Football Federation) Benfica
Thuram 55'; McKennie 64'	Report

Juventus Stadium, Turin
Attendance: 41,626
Referee: Serdar Gözübüyük (Netherlands)

21 January 2026
21:00 (20:00 UTC+0)

Newcastle United (The Football Association)	3–0	(Royal Dutch Football Association) PSV Eindhoven
Wissa 8'; Gordon 30'; Barnes 65'	Report

St James' Park, Newcastle upon Tyne
Attendance: 52,076
Referee: Daniel Siebert (Germany)

21 January 2026
21:00

Marseille (French Football Federation)	0–3	(The Football Association) Liverpool
	Report	Szoboszlai 45+1'; Rulli 72' (o.g.); Gakpo 90+3'

Stade Vélodrome, Marseille
Attendance: 65,631
Referee: Slavko Vinčić (Slovenia)

21 January 2026
21:00

Slavia Prague (Football Association of the Czech Republic)	2–4	(Royal Spanish Football Federation) Barcelona
Kušej 10'; Lewandowski 44' (o.g.)	Report	López 34', 42'; Olmo 63'; Lewandowski 71'

Fortuna Arena, Prague
Attendance: 19,242
Referee: Chris Kavanagh (England)

=== Matchday 8 ===
28 January 2026
21:00

Ajax (Royal Dutch Football Association)	1–2	(Hellenic Football Federation) Olympiacos
Dolberg 69' (pen.)	Report	Martins 52'; Hezze 79'

Johan Cruyff Arena, Amsterdam
Attendance: 51,719
Referee: François Letexier (France)

28 January 2026
21:00 (20:00 UTC+0)

Arsenal (The Football Association)	3–2	(Kazakhstan Football Federation) Kairat
Gyökeres 3'; Havertz 15'; Martinelli 36'	Report	Jorginho 7' (pen.); Ricardinho 90+4'

Emirates Stadium, London
Attendance: 50,200
Referee: Urs Schnyder (Switzerland)

28 January 2026
21:00

Monaco (French Football Federation)	0–0	(Italian Football Federation) Juventus
	Report

Stade Louis II, Monaco
Attendance: 10,287
Referee: José María Sánchez Martínez (Spain)

28 January 2026
21:00

Athletic Bilbao (Royal Spanish Football Federation)	2–3	(Portuguese Football Federation) Sporting CP
Sancet 3'; Guruzeta 28'	Report	Diomande 12'; Trincão 62'; Alisson 90+4'

San Mamés, Bilbao
Attendance: 52,065
Referee: Felix Zwayer (Germany)

28 January 2026
21:00

Atlético Madrid (Royal Spanish Football Federation)	1–2	(Norwegian Football Federation) Bodø/Glimt
Sørloth 15'	Report	Sjøvold 34'; Høgh 59'

Metropolitano Stadium, Madrid
Attendance: 58,910
Referee: Maurizio Mariani (Italy)

28 January 2026
21:00

Bayer Leverkusen (German Football Association)	3–0	(Royal Spanish Football Federation) Villarreal
Tillman 12', 35'; Grimaldo 57'	Report

BayArena, Leverkusen
Attendance: 30,210
Referee: Espen Eskås (Norway)

28 January 2026
21:00

Borussia Dortmund (German Football Association)	0–2	(Italian Football Federation) Inter Milan
	Report	Dimarco 81'; Diouf 90+4'

Westfalenstadion, Dortmund
Attendance: 81,365
Referee: István Kovács (Romania)

28 January 2026
21:00

Club Brugge (Royal Belgian Football Association)	3–0	(French Football Federation) Marseille
Diakhon 4'; Vermant 11'; Stanković 79'	Report

Jan Breydel Stadium, Bruges
Attendance: 26,361
Referee: Marco Guida (Italy)

28 January 2026
21:00

Eintracht Frankfurt (German Football Association)	0–2	(The Football Association) Tottenham Hotspur
	Report	Kolo Muani 47'; Solanke 77'

Waldstadion, Frankfurt
Attendance: 58,000
Referee: Jesús Gil Manzano (Spain)

28 January 2026
21:00

Barcelona (Royal Spanish Football Federation)	4–1	(Danish Football Association) Copenhagen
Lewandowski 48'; Yamal 60'; Raphinha 69' (pen.); Rashford 85'	Report	Daðason 4'

Camp Nou, Barcelona
Attendance: 44,609
Referee: Benoît Bastien (France)

28 January 2026
21:00 (20:00 UTC+0)

Liverpool (The Football Association)	6–0	(Association of Football Federations of Azerbaijan) Qarabağ
Mac Allister 15', 61'; Wirtz 21'; Salah 50'; Ekitike 57'; Chiesa 90'	Report

Anfield, Liverpool
Attendance: 60,043
Referee: Ivan Kružliak (Slovakia)

28 January 2026
21:00 (20:00 UTC+0)

Manchester City (The Football Association)	2–0	(Turkish Football Federation) Galatasaray
Haaland 11'; Cherki 29'	Report

City of Manchester Stadium, Manchester
Attendance: 35,259
Referee: Alejandro Hernández Hernández (Spain)

28 January 2026
21:00 (22:00 UTC+2)

Pafos (Cyprus Football Association)	4–1	(Football Association of the Czech Republic) Slavia Prague
Dragomir 17'; Bruno 53'; Anderson 84'; Oršić 87'	Report	Chaloupek 44'

Alphamega Stadium, Limassol
Attendance: 5,109
Referee: Tobias Stieler (Germany)

28 January 2026
21:00

Paris Saint-Germain (French Football Federation)	1–1	(The Football Association) Newcastle United
Vitinha 8'	Report	Willock 45+2'

Parc des Princes, Paris
Attendance: 47,637
Referee: Slavko Vinčić (Slovenia)

28 January 2026
21:00

PSV Eindhoven (Royal Dutch Football Association)	1–2	(German Football Association) Bayern Munich
Saibari 78'	Report	Musiala 58'; Kane 84'

Philips Stadion, Eindhoven
Attendance: 35,000
Referee: João Pinheiro (Portugal)

28 January 2026
21:00

Union Saint-Gilloise (Royal Belgian Football Association)	1–0	(Italian Football Federation) Atalanta
Khalaily 70'	Report

Constant Vanden Stock Stadium, Brussels
Attendance: 15,010
Referee: Michael Oliver (England)

28 January 2026
21:00 (20:00 UTC+0)

Benfica (Portuguese Football Federation)	4–2	(Royal Spanish Football Federation) Real Madrid
Schjelderup 36', 54'; Pavlidis 45+5' (pen.); Trubin 90+8'	Report	Mbappé 30', 58'

Estádio da Luz, Lisbon
Attendance: 64,305
Referee: Davide Massa (Italy)

28 January 2026
21:00

Napoli (Italian Football Federation)	2–3	(The Football Association) Chelsea
Vergara 33'; Højlund 43'	Report	Fernández 19' (pen.); João Pedro 61', 82'

Stadio Diego Armando Maradona, Naples
Attendance: 46,513
Referee: Clément Turpin (France)
