= 2025–26 Club Brugge KV season =

Club Brugge KV
2025–26 season
- President: Bart Verhaeghe
- Manager: Nicky Hayen (until 8 December); Ivan Leko (from 8 December)
- Stadium: Jan Breydel Stadium
- Belgian Pro League: 1st
- Belgian Cup: Quarter-finals
- Belgian Super Cup: Winners
- UEFA Champions League: Knockout phase play-offs
- Top goalscorer: League: Nicolò Tresoldi (19); All: Nicolò Tresoldi (23)
- Average home league attendance: 24,049
Home colours	Away colours	Third colours

The 2025–26 season was the 135th season in the history of Club Brugge KV, and the club's 66th consecutive season in the Belgian Pro League. In addition to the domestic league, the club participated in the Belgian Cup, the Belgian Super Cup and the UEFA Champions League.

== Summary ==
On 8 December 2025, Leko joined Club Brugge, replacing Nicky Hayen.

== Squad ==
As of 24 January 2026

Note: Flags indicate national team as defined under FIFA eligibility rules; some limited exceptions apply. Players may hold more than one non-FIFA nationality.

No.	Pos.	Nation	Player
4	DF	ECU	Joel Ordóñez
6	MF	NED	Ludovit Reis
7	FW	GER	Nicolò Tresoldi
8	FW	GRE	Christos Tzolis
9	FW	POR	Carlos Forbs
10	MF	NOR	Hugo Vetlesen
11	MF	BEL	Cisse Sandra
14	DF	NED	Bjorn Meijer
15	MF	NGR	Raphael Onyedika
16	GK	NED	Dani van den Heuvel
17	FW	BEL	Romeo Vermant
19	FW	SWE	Gustaf Nilsson
20	MF	BEL	Hans Vanaken (captain)
22	GK	BEL	Simon Mignolet

No.	Pos.	Nation	Player
24	DF	NGR	Vince Osuji
25	MF	SRB	Aleksandar Stanković
29	GK	BEL	Nordin Jackers
41	DF	BEL	Hugo Siquet
44	DF	BEL	Brandon Mechele
58	DF	BEL	Jorne Spileers
62	MF	BEL	Lynnt Audoor
64	DF	BEL	Kyriani Sabbe
65	DF	BEL	Joaquin Seys
67	FW	SEN	Mamadou Diakhon
70	MF	ESP	Alejandro Granados
80	MF	FRA	Félix Lemaréchal
84	FW	RSA	Shandre Campbell

== Transfers ==
=== In ===
Pos.	Player	Transferred from	Fee	Date	Source
FW	(Germany) Nicolò Tresoldi	(Germany) Hannover 96		7 June 2025	
MF	(Netherlands) Ludovit Reis	(Germany) Hamburger SV		25 June 2025	
FW	(Portugal) Carlos Forbs	(Netherlands) Ajax		17 July 2025	
MF	(Serbia) Aleksandar Stanković	(Italy) Inter Milan		24 July 2025	
FW	(Senegal) Mamadou Diakhon	(France) Reims		18 August 2025	

=== Out ===
Pos.	Player	Transferred to	Fee	Date	Source
FW	(Spain) Ferran Jutglà	(Spain) Celta Vigo		24 June 2025	
MF	(Denmark) Casper Nielsen	(Belgium) Standard Liège		2 July 2025	
DF	(Belgium) Maxim De Cuyper	(England) Brighton & Hove Albion		5 July 2025	
MF	(Morocco) Chemsdine Talbi	(England) Sunderland		9 July 2025	
MF	(Switzerland) Ardon Jashari	(Italy) Milan		6 August 2025	
GK	(England) Josef Bursik	(England) Portsmouth		1 September 2025	
MF	(Poland) Michał Skóraś	(Belgium) Gent		6 September 2025	

== Friendlies ==
28 June 2025 Friendly	Club Brugge	2–0	K.V. Kortrijk
	Osuji 45', 45+1'	Report

6 July 2025 Friendly	Rangers	2–2	Club Brugge	Glasgow, Scotland
14:00 BST (UTC+1)	Diomande 51'; Curtis 89'	Report	Vetlesen 10'; Reis 13'	Stadium: Ibrox Stadium; Attendance: 29,480; Referee: Don Robertson

11 July 2025 Friendly	Club Brugge	1–1	Raków Częstochowa
	Reis 21'	Report	Brunes 3'

16 July 2025 Friendly	Club Brugge	3–0	Lokomotiva Zagreb
	Vanaken 61'; Vetlesen 71'; Campbell 90+13'	Report

23 July 2025 Friendly	Club Brugge	1–3	Patro Eisden
	Goal	Report	Goal

27 July 2025 Friendly	Club Brugge	2–1	KRC Genk
	Ordóñez 64'; Mechele 82'	Report	Hyeon-gyu 9'

== Competitions ==
=== Belgian Pro League ===
==== Regular season ====
Pos	Team	Pld	W	D	L	GF	GA	GD	Pts	Qualification or relegation
1	Union SG	30	19	9	2	50	17	+33	66	Qualification for the Europa League and Champions' play-offs (Note: The regular season winners will qualify for the 2026–27 UEFA Europa League if not earning a 2026–27 UEFA Champions League place in the playoff.)
2	Club Brugge	30	20	3	7	59	36	+23	63	Qualification for the Champions' play-offs
3	Sint-Truiden	30	18	3	9	47	35	+12	57	Qualification for the Champions' play-offs
4	Gent	30	13	6	11	49	43	+6	45	Qualification for the Champions' play-offs
5	Mechelen	30	12	9	9	39	37	+2	45	Qualification for the Champions' play-offs

Source: Jupiler Pro League (in Dutch)
Rules for classification: 1) Points; 2) Matches won; 3) Goal difference; 4) Goals scored; 5) Away matches won; 6) Away goal difference; 7) Away goals scored; 8) Play-off.

==== Matches ====
27 July 2025 1	Club Brugge	2–1	Genk	Bruges
18:30	Ordóñez 62'; Mechele 81'	Report	Oh 9'; Fink (yellow card) 74'	Stadium: Jan Breydel Stadium; Attendance: 24,073; Referee: Jasper Vergoote

1 August 2025 2	K.V. Mechelen	2–1	Club Brugge	Mechelen
20:45	Mrabti 8'; Schoofs 51'	Report	Tzolis 71'	Stadium: Achter de Kazerne; Attendance: 14,275; Referee: Erik Lambrechts

9 August 2025 3	Club Brugge	2–0	Cercle Brugge
	Vanaken 60'; Tzolis 65'	Report

16 August 2025 4	Zulte Waregem	0–1	Club Brugge
		Report	Campbell 90+3'

31 August 2025 6	KAA Gent	1–1	Club Brugge
	Goore 90+9'	Report	Vanaken 54'

13 September 2025 7	La Louvière	1–0	Club Brugge
	Faye 20'	Report	Spileers (yellow card) 26'

21 September 2025 8	Club Brugge	2–0	Sint-Truiden
	Mechele 45+1'; Tresoldi 59'	Report

24 September 2025 5	Club Brugge	5–5	Westerlo	Westerlo
20:45	Tresoldi 45+4', 86'; Forbs 49'; Seys 55'; Bayram 90+2' (o.g.)	Report	Alcócer 1'; Ferri 45+2', 61'; Sakamoto 68'; Bayram 90+8'	Stadium: Het Kuipje; Attendance: 24,000; Referee: Lawrence Visser

27 September 2025 9	Standard Liège	1–2	Club Brugge	Liège
18:15	Saïd 8'; Fossey (red card) 62'	Report	Tzolis 10'; Vermant 90+1'	Stadium: Stade Maurice Dufrasne; Attendance: 25,000; Referee: Jasper Vergoote

5 October 2025 10	Club Brugge	1–0	Union Saint-Gilloise
	Forbs 78'	Report

18 October 2025 11	OH Leuven	0–1	Club Brugge
		Report	Tzolis 74'

26 October 2025 12	Antwerp	0–1	Club Brugge	Antwerp
13:30 CET (UTC+1)	Benítez (yellow card) 27'; Somers (yellow card) 72'		Vermant 12'; Jackers (yellow card) 90+5'	Stadium: Bosuilstadion; Attendance: 14,036; Referee: Nicolas Laforge

1 November 2025 13	Club Brugge	2–1	Dender
18:15	Tresoldi 19'; Tzolis 30'		Berte 90+1'

9 November 2025 14	RSC Anderlecht	1–0	Club Brugge
13:30	Cvetković 6'

22 November 2025 15	Club Brugge	1–0	Charleroi
20:45	Vanaken 60'

30 November 2025 16	Club Brugge	0–1	Antwerp	Bruges
13:30 CET (UTC+1)			Benítez (yellow card) 68', (goal) 88'; Kouyaté (yellow card) 90+3'; Nozawa (yellow card) 90+7'	Stadium: Jan Breydel Stadium; Attendance: 29,042; Referee: Lothar D'Hondt

6 December 2025 17	Sint-Truidense	3–2	Club Brugge
20:45	Muja 22'; Itō 32'; Ferrari 81'		Onyedika 16'; Furo 70'

14 December 2025 18	Dender	1–5	Club Brugge
16:00	Nsimba 24'		Tzolis 45+4', 51'; Vermant 70', 74'; Stanković 90+3'

21 December 2025 19	Club Brugge	2–1	KAA Gent
13:30	Vermant 22'; Tresoldi 86'		Paskotši 53'

26 December 2025 20	Genk	3–5	Club Brugge
13:30	Sor 25'; Heymans 51'; Itō 76'		Vetlesen 14'; Vermant 23'; Vanaken 44'; Stanković 81'; Sandra 90+3'

16 January 2026 21	Club Brugge	2–3	RAAL La Louvière
	Vermant 23'; Vetlesen 30'; Ordóñez (red card) 39'		Afriyie 61'; Lahssaini 81'; Fall 89'

24 January 2026 22	Club Brugge	4–3	Zulte Waregem
	Mechele 47'; Stanković 6', 60'; Tresoldi 78'		Aké 39'; Ementa 40'; Opoku 80'

1 February 2026 23	Union Saint-Gilloise	1–0	Club Brugge
	Zorgane 31'

8 February 2026 24	Club Brugge	3–0	Standard Liège
	Tresoldi 34'; Bates 45' (o.g.); Ordóñez 45+2'

15 February 2026 25	Cercle Brugge	1–2	Club Brugge
	Nazinho 72'		Tresoldi 52'; Forbs 55'

21 February 2026 26	Club Brugge	2–1	OH Leuven
	Meijer 53'; Tresoldi 62'		Ikwuemesi 56'

1 March 2026 27	SC Charleroi	1–2	Club Brugge
	Keita 36'; Kerkhof (red card)		Tzolis 74'; Ordóñez 90+10'

8 March 2026 28	Club Brugge	2–2	Anderlecht
	Tresoldi 42', 85'	Report	De Cat 36'; Degreef 53'

14 March 2026 29	K.V.C. Westerlo	1–2	Club Brugge
	Kimura 64'		Tzolis 8'; Tresoldi 39'

22 March 2026 30	Club Brugge	4–1	K.V. Mechelen
	Tresoldi 2'; Sabbe 22', 38'; Mechele 71'		Raman 56'

==== Champions' play-offs ====
Pos	Team	Pld	W	D	L	GF	GA	GD	Pts	Qualification or relegation
1	Club Brugge (C)	10	8	1	1	32	9	+23	57	Qualification for the Champions League league phase
2	Union SG	10	6	2	2	16	10	+6	53	Qualification for the Champions League third qualifying round
3	Sint-Truiden	10	4	2	4	14	11	+3	43	Qualification for the Europa League play-off round (Note: Union SG won the 2025–26 Belgian Cup and qualified for the Champions League through finishing in the top two, the Europa League play-off round berth was therefore transferred to Sint-Truiden.)
4	Anderlecht	10	3	2	5	16	23	−7	33	Qualification for the Europa League second qualifying round

Source: Jupiler Pro League (in Dutch), Soccerway
Rules for classification: 1) Points; 2) Points without (possible) half points added due to rounding; 3) Regular season finishing position.
(C) Champions
Notes:

Round	1	2	3	4	5	6	7	8	9	10
Ground	H	A	A	H	A	A	H	H	A	H
Result	W	W	L	W	W	W	W	W	D	W
Position	2	2	2	2	2	1	1	1	1	1

Updated to match(es) played on 19 April 2026. Source:
A = Away; H = Home; W = Win; D = Draw; L = Loss

===== Matches =====
6 April 2026 1	Club Brugge	4–2	Anderlecht	Jan Breydel Stadium
13:30	Sabbe 15'; Stanković 29'; Tzolis 37'; Vermant 90+4'	Report	Hazard 55'; Cvetković 90+1'	Attendance: 24,484; Referee: Jasper Vergoote

11 April 2026 2	Sint-Truiden	1–2	Club Brugge	Stayen
20:45	Itō 22'	Report	Vetlesen 48'; Tzolis 80' (pen.)	Referee: Lothar D'Hondt

19 April 2026 3	Union Saint-Gilloise	2–1	Club Brugge	Joseph Marien Stadium
18:30	Biondic 29'; Zeneli 81'	Report	Mechele 15'	Attendance: 7,858; Referee: Lawrence Visser

22 April 2026 4	Club Brugge	6–1	Mechelen	Bruges
20:30	Vetlesen 4'; Stanković 46'; Forbs 56'; Tresoldi 60'; Vanaken 78'; Tzolis 90+5' (pen.)	Report	Konaté 10'; Diouf (red card) 90+5'	Stadium: Jan Breydel Stadium; Referee: Bram Van Driessche

26 April 2026 5	KAA Gent	0–2	Club Brugge	Planet Group Arena
		Report	Vetlesen 4'; Tzolis 89'	Referee: Erik Lambrechts

3 May 2026 6	Anderlecht	1–3	Club Brugge	Constant Vanden Stock Stadium
	Cvetković 83'	Report	Angély 8' (o.g.); Forbs 59'; Tzolis 61'	Referee: Nicolas Laforge

9 May 2026 7	Club Brugge	2–0	Sint-Truiden	Jan Breydel Stadium
	Tresoldi 13'; Forbs 52'	Report	Merlen (red card) 63'	Referee: Jasper Vergoote

17 May 2026 8	Club Brugge	5–0	Union Saint-Gilloise	Jan Breydel Stadium
	Vanaken 31', 45+1'; Seys 38'; Tzolis 87'; Forbs 90+5'	Report		Referee: Lothar D'Hondt

21 May 2026 9	Mechelen	2–2	Club Brugge	Achter de Kazerne
	van Brederode 48'; van den Heuvel 87' (o.g.)	Report	Tzolis 17'; Tresoldi 51'	Referee: Simon Bourdeaud'hui

24 May 2026 10	Club Brugge	5–0	KAA Gent	Jan Breydel Stadium
	Forbs 21'; Tresoldi 33', 41', 53'; Tzolis 79'	Report		Referee: Erik Lambrechts

=== Belgian Cup ===
29 October 2025	Club Brugge	6–1	Eendracht Aalst Lede	Bruges
20:30 CET	Mechele 7'; Campbell 14'; Wantens 38' (o.g.); Bauwens 57' (o.g.); Sandra 70', 90'	Report	Triest 51'	Stadium: Jan Breydel Stadium

3 December 2025	OH Leuven	1–2	Club Brugge	Leuven
20:30 CET	Kaba 71'	Report	Vetlesen 34'; Tzolis 82' (pen.)	Stadium: Den Dreef

13 January 2026	Charleroi	2–0	Club Brugge	Charleroi
20:30 CET	Guiagon 20' (pen.), 45+4'	Report	Campbell (red card) 90+6'	Stadium: Stade du Pays de Charleroi

=== Belgian Super Cup ===
20 July 2025 Final	Union SG	1–2	Club Brugge	Joseph Marien Stadium, Forest
18:30 CEST	Ivanović 15'		Tzolis 31' (pen.); Vanaken 45+1'	Referee: Lawrence Visser

=== UEFA Champions League ===
==== League phase ====
Pos	Team	Pld	W	D	L	GF	GA	GD	Pts	Qualification
17	(German Football Association) Borussia Dortmund	8	3	2	3	19	17	+2	11	Advance to knockout phase play-offs (unseeded)
18	(Hellenic Football Federation) Olympiacos	8	3	2	3	10	14	−4	11	Advance to knockout phase play-offs (unseeded)
19	(Royal Belgian Football Association) Club Brugge	8	3	1	4	15	17	−2	10	Advance to knockout phase play-offs (unseeded)
20	(Turkish Football Federation) Galatasaray	8	3	1	4	9	11	−2	10	Advance to knockout phase play-offs (unseeded)
21	(French Football Federation) Monaco	8	2	4	2	8	14	−6	10	Advance to knockout phase play-offs (unseeded)

Source: UEFA
Rules for classification: League phase tiebreakers

18 September 2025	Club Brugge	4–1	(France) Monaco	Jan Breydel Stadium, Bruges
18:45	Tresoldi 32'; Onyedika 39'; Vanaken 42'; Diakhon 75'	Report	Fati 90+1'	Attendance: 25,007; Referee: Simone Sozza (Italy)

30 September 2025	Atalanta (Italy)	2–1	Club Brugge	Stadio Atleti Azzurri d'Italia, Bergamo
18:45	Samardžić 74' (pen.); Pašalić 87'	Report	Tzolis 38'	Attendance: 21,950; Referee: Espen Eskås (Norway)

22 October 2025	Bayern Munich (Germany)	4–0	Club Brugge	Allianz Arena, Munich
21:00	Karl 5'; Kane 14'; Díaz 34'; Jackson 79'	Report		Attendance: 75,000; Referee: Donatas Rumšas (Lithuania)

5 November 2025	Club Brugge	3–3	(Spain) Barcelona	Jan Breydel Stadium, Bruges
21:00	Tresoldi 6'; Forbs 17', 63'	Report	Torres 8'; Yamal 61'; Tzolis 77' (o.g.)	Attendance: 27,037; Referee: Anthony Taylor (England)

26 November 2025	Sporting CP (Portugal)	3–0	Club Brugge	Estádio José Alvalade, Lisbon
21:00 (20:00 UTC+0)	Quenda 24'; Suárez 31'; Trincão 70'	Report		Attendance: 41,634; Referee: Tobias Stieler (Germany)

10 December 2025	Club Brugge (Belgium)	0–3	(England) Arsenal	Jan Breydel Stadium, Bruges
21:00		Report	Madueke 25', 47'; Martinelli 56'	Attendance: 26,464; Referee: Sven Jablonski (Germany)

20 January 2026	Kairat (Kazakhstan)	1–4	Club Brugge	Astana Arena, Astana (Note: Match was played in Astana, instead of Kairat's regular stadium, Central Stadium, Almaty, due to the potential for extreme winter weather conditions.)
16:30 (20:30 UTC+5)	Sadybekov 90+2'	Report	Stanković 32'; Vanaken 38'; Vermant 74'; Mechele 84'	Attendance: 11,324; Referee: Donatas Rumšas (Lithuania)

28 January 2026	Club Brugge (Belgium)	3–0	(France) Marseille	Jan Breydel Stadium, Bruges
21:00	Diakohn 4'; Vermant 11'; Vanaken (yellow card) 50'; Stanković 79'	Report	Murillo (yellow card) 22'; Gouiri (yellow card) 80'	Attendance: 26,361; Referee: Marco Guida (Italy)

==== Knockout phase ====
18 February 2026	Club Brugge	3–3	Atlético Madrid	Jan Breydel Stadium, Bruges
21:00	Onyedika 52'; Tresoldi 60'; Tzolis 89'	Report	Alvarez 8' (pen.); Lookman 45+4'; Ordóñez 79' (o.g.)	Attendance: 25,235; Referee: Glenn Nyberg (Sweden)

24 February 2026	Atlético Madrid	4–1 (7–4 agg.)	Club Brugge	Metropolitano Stadium, Madrid
18:45	Sørloth 23', 76', 87'; Cardoso 48'	Report	Ordóñez 36'	Attendance: 66,756; Referee: Clément Turpin (France)

== Statistics ==
Last updated on 20 July 2025

No.	Pos	Nat	Player	Total		Pro League		Belgian Cup		Belgian Super Cup		UEFA Champions League	
No.	Pos	Nat	Player	Apps	Goals	Apps	Goals	Apps	Goals	Apps	Goals	Apps	Goals
Goalkeepers
22	GK	(Belgium) BEL	Simon Mignolet	0	0	0	0	0	0	0	0	0	0
33	GK	(Netherlands) NED	Dani van den Heuvel	0	0	0	0	0	0	0	0	0	0
29	GK	(Belgium) BEL	Nordin Jackers	0	0	0	0	0	0	0	0	0	0
Defenders
2	DF	(Argentina) ARG	Zaid Romero	0	0	0	0	0	0	0	0	0	0
4	DF	(Ecuador) ECU	Joel Ordóñez	0	0	0	0	0	0	0	0	0	0
14	DF	(Netherlands) NED	Bjorn Meijer	0	0	0	0	0	0	0	0	0	0
41	DF	(Belgium) BEL	Hugo Siquet	0	0	0	0	0	0	0	0	0	0
44	DF	(Belgium) BEL	Brandon Mechele	0	0	0	0	0	0	0	0	0	0
58	DF	(Belgium) BEL	Jorne Spileers	0	0	0	0	0	0	0	0	0	0
64	DF	(Belgium) BEL	Kyriani Sabbe	0	0	0	0	0	0	0	0	0	0
65	DF	(Belgium) BEL	Joaquin Seys	0	0	0	0	0	0	0	0	0	0
66	DF	(Ivory Coast) CIV	Bi Abdoul Kader Yameogo	0	0	0	0	0	0	0	0	0	0
Midfielders
10	FW	(Norway) NOR	Hugo Vetlesen	0	0	0	0	0	0	0	0	0	0
15	MF	(Nigeria) NGR	Raphael Onyedika	0	0	0	0	0	0	0	0	0	0
20	MF	(Belgium) BEL	Hans Vanaken	0	0	0	0	0	0	0	0	0	0
Forwards
8	FW	(Greece) GRE	Christos Tzolis	0	0	0	0	0	0	0	0	0	0
17	FW	(Belgium) BEL	Romeo Vermant	0	0	0	0	0	0	0	0	0	0
19	FW	(Sweden) SWE	Gustaf Nilsson	0	0	0	0	0	0	0	0	0	0
Players who have made an appearance this season but have left the club
