= Carlos Forbs =

Portuguese footballer (born 2004)

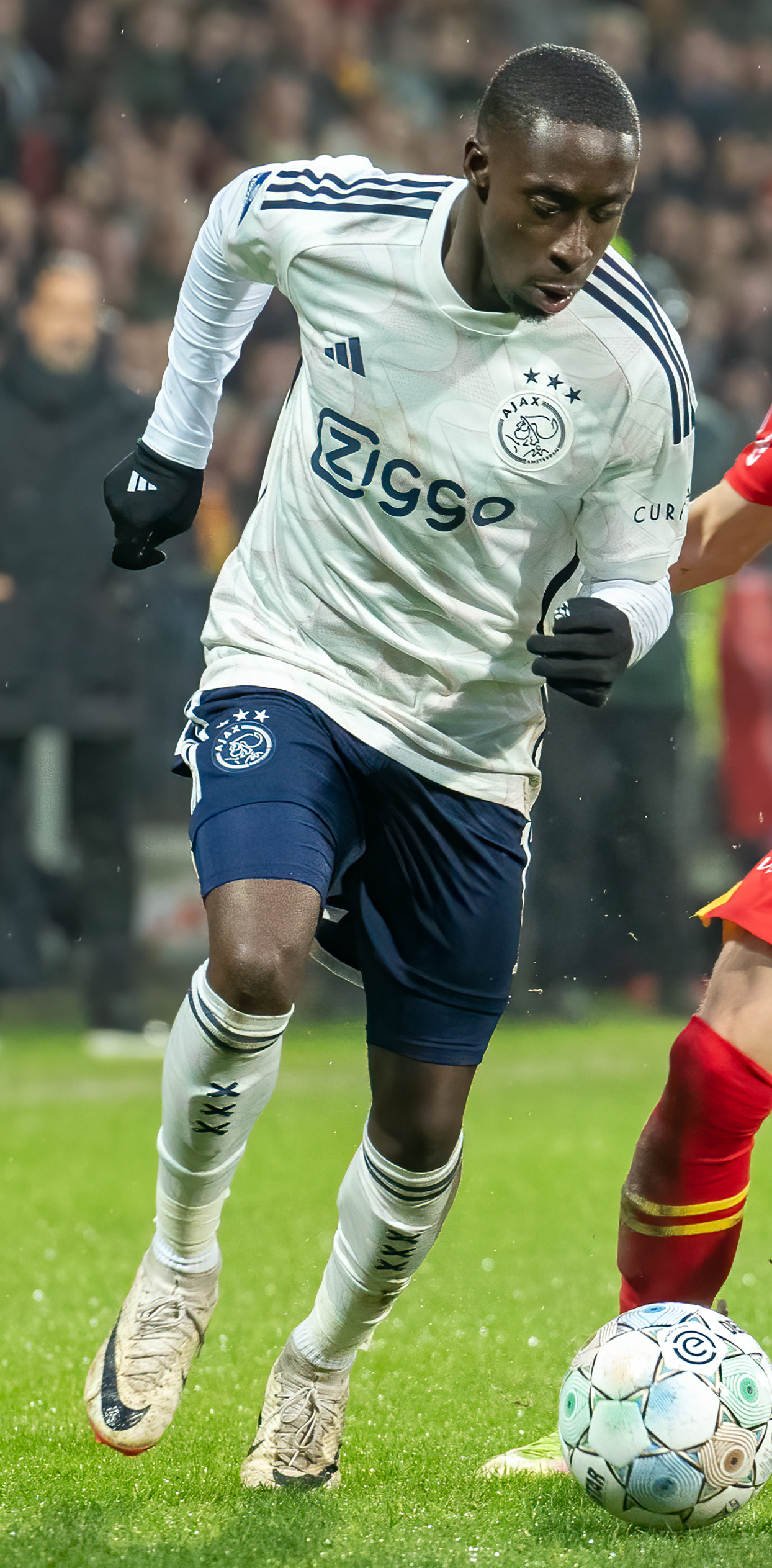
- Forbs with Ajax in 2024

Personal information
- Full name: Carlos Roberto Forbs Borges
- Date of birth: 19 March 2004 (age 22)
- Place of birth: Sintra, Portugal
- Height: 1.69 m (5 ft 7 in)
- Position: Winger

Team information
- Current team: Club Brugge
- Number: 9

Youth career
- 2011–2014: NADCC Sintra
- 2014–2015: Sporting CP
- 2015–2023: Manchester City

Senior career*
Years	Team	Apps	(Gls)
2023–2025	Ajax	22	(2)
2024	Jong Ajax	2	(1)
2024–2025	→ Wolverhampton Wanderers (loan)	10	(0)
2025–	Club Brugge	44	(10)

International career^{‡}
2020	Portugal U16	3	(1)
2022	Portugal U18	3	(1)
2022–2023	Portugal U19	16	(2)
2023–	Portugal U21	18	(5)
2025–	Portugal	3	(1)
Medal record
Men's football
Representing Portugal
UEFA European Under-19 Championship
Runner-up	2023 Malta
- * Club domestic league appearances and goals as of 31 October 2026 ‡ National team caps and goals as of 23:05, 17 November 2026 (UTC)

Carlos Roberto Forbs Borges (born 19 March 2004) is a Portuguese professional footballer who plays as a winger for Belgian Pro League club Club Brugge and the Portugal national team.

== Club career ==
=== Early career ===
Born in Sintra, Lisboa Region, Forbs started playing football there, before enjoying a season-short spell at Sporting CP in the capital. He moved to England at the age of around 11, where he attended high-school at the Cooperative Academy of Leeds, but soon caught the eye of many Premier League scouts, joining the Manchester City academy in 2015.

In Manchester, he progressed through all of the youth categories, becoming a regular provider of goals and assists with the under-18 and under-23 teams, as City won both national tournaments between 2020 and 2022. He was named under-18 player of the season for Manchester City in May 2021.

By the end of 2021, he made his Youth League debut, scoring the only goal in a 1–0 away pool win against RB Leipzig.

He made headlines in September 2022, as he scored a hat-trick and delivered an assist during Manchester City's opening game of the Youth League, a 5–1 away win against Sevilla. He also proved to be instrumental a month later, with a goal and an assist in the 3–1 win at Copenhagen. In the 2022–23 season, he scored 25 goals and provided 13 assists in all competitions for Manchester City U21.

=== Ajax ===
On 3 August 2023, Forbs signed for Eredivisie club Ajax on a five-year contract in a €14 million deal, which could rise to €19 million with variables. Nine days later, he made his professional debut for the Amsterdam side, coming off the bench to replace Brian Brobbey in the final minutes of a 4–1 home victory over Heracles Almelo, in the 2023–24 Eredivisie's opening game-week.

Ten days later, in the next league match, away to Excelsior, Forbs started and assisted Brobbey's opener, before being replaced by Davy Klaassen in the 60th minute; the game ended in a 2–2 draw. On 24 August, he made his debut in European competitions, coming on as a second-half substitute in a 4–1 win away at Ludogorets Razgrad, in the UEFA Europa League play-off round.

On 21 September, in an Europa League group stage match at home to Marseille, Forbs scored his first professional goal and also provided an assist; the game ended in a 3–3 draw.

=== Wolverhampton Wanderers ===
On 30 August 2024, Forbs returned to England and joined Premier League club Wolverhampton Wanderers on an initial season-long loan.

=== Club Brugge ===
On 17 July 2025, Forbs joined Belgian Pro League side Club Brugge for a reported fee close to €8 million, signing a four-year contract. He made his debut for the club as a 46th minute substitute for Hugo Vetlesen against Genk on 27 July, entering the field while his team was 0–1 down in an eventual 2–1 win.

On 5 November 2025, Forbs scored twice and provided an assist in a 3–3 draw against Barcelona in the Champions League league phase, being named Player of the Match for his efforts.

== International career ==
Born in Portugal, Forbs is of Guinea-Bissau descent. He is a youth international for Portugal. By 2022, he became a regular starter with the Portuguese under-19s.

On 8 September 2023, Forbs made his debut for Portugal's under-21s, coming on as a second-half substitute in a 3–0 home win over Andorra, in a qualifier for the 2025 UEFA European Under-21 Championship.

Forbs was called up to the Portugal senior team on 8 November 2025 for the 2025 FIFA World Cup qualification matches against Republic of Ireland and Armenia respectively. He made his senior national debut on 16 November, coming off the bench to replace Bernardo Silva and winning a penalty in a 9–1 victory over Armenia, at the Estádio do Dragão, as Portugal secured qualification for the 2026 World Cup.

On 14 November 2026, Forbs became the first player to wear the number 7 shirt for the Portugal national team following Cristiano Ronaldo's retirement in a 4–1 loss to Denmark in the 2026–27 UEFA Nations League. The new shirt features a horizontal slash through the number 7, visually distinguishing it from the number previously worn by Ronaldo.

On 17 November 2026, Portugal defeated Wales 3–2 at Cardiff City Stadium, in the sixth and final matchday of the 2026–27 UEFA Nations League group stage, securing first place in Group A4. Carlos Forbs came on in the 59th minute and scored the winning goal in the 70th minute, marking his first goal for the national team and making him the first player to score wearing the new number 7 shirt.

== Personal life ==
Formerly known as Carlos Borges, the player has opted to play using his mother's surname as Carlos Forbs since he joined Ajax in August 2023.

== Career statistics ==
=== Club ===
As of match played 4 November 2026

Appearances and goals by club, season and competition
Club	Season	League			National cup (Note: Includes KNVB Cup)		League cup (Note: Includes EFL Cup)		Europe		Other		Total	
Club	Season	Division	Apps	Goals	Apps	Goals	Apps	Goals	Apps	Goals	Apps	Goals	Apps	Goals
Manchester City U21	2022–23	–			–		–		–		3 (Note: Appearances in EFL Trophy)	4	3	4
Ajax	2023–24	Eredivisie	21	2	1	0	–		10 (Note: Eight appearances and one goal in UEFA Europa League, two appearances in UEFA Europa Conference League)	1	–		32	3
Ajax	2024–25	Eredivisie	1	0	—		–		5 (Note: Apperanaces in UEFA Europa League)	0	–		6	0
Ajax	Total		22	2	1	0	–		15	1	–		38	3
Jong Ajax	2023–24	Eerste Divisie	2	1	–		–		–		–		2	1
Wolverhampton Wanderers (loan)	2024–25	Premier League	10	0	0	0	1	0	–		–		11	0
Club Brugge	2025–26	Belgian Pro League	35	7	0	0	–		13 (Note: Appearances in UEFA Champions League)	3	0	0	48	10
Club Brugge	2026–27	Belgian Pro League	9	3	0	0	–		4	2	1 (Note: Appearance in Belgian Super Cup)	0	14	5
Club Brugge	Total		44	10	0	0	—		17	5	1	0	62	15
Career total			78	13	1	0	1	0	32	6	4	4	116	23

=== International ===
As of match played 17 November 2026

Appearances and goals by national team and year
National team	Year	Apps	Goals
Portugal	2025	1	0
Portugal	2026	2	1
Total		3	1

Scores and results list Portugal's goal tally first, score column indicates score after each Forbs goal.

List of international goals scored by Carlos Forbs
No.	Date	Venue	Cap	Opponent	Score	Result	Competition
1	17 November 2026	Cardiff City Stadium, Cardiff, Wales	3	Wales	3–2	3–2	2026–27 UEFA Nations League A

== Honours ==
Individual

- UEFA European Under-19 Championship Team of the Tournament: 2023
