= Aleksandar Stanković (footballer, born 2005) =

Serbian footballer (born 2005)

Personal information
- Date of birth: 3 August 2005 (age 21)
- Place of birth: Milan, Italy
- Height: 1.85 m (6 ft 1 in)
- Position: Defensive midfielder

Team information
- Current team: Inter Milan
- Number: 5

Youth career
- 2016–2024: Inter Milan

Senior career*
Years	Team	Apps	(Gls)
2024–2025	Inter Milan	0	(0)
2024–2025	→ Luzern (loan)	38	(3)
2025–2026	Club Brugge	39	(6)
2026–	Inter Milan	5	(0)

International career^{‡}
2021	Serbia U16	3	(3)
2021–2022	Serbia U17	11	(1)
2022	Serbia U18	2	(1)
2023–2024	Serbia U19	11	(2)
2025–	Serbia	10	(1)
- * Club domestic league appearances and goals as of 22 November 2026 ‡ National team caps and goals as of 4 October 2026

Aleksandar Stanković (Serbian Cyrillic: Александар Станковић, Serbian pronunciation: [alɛksǎːndar stǎŋkoʋitɕ]; born 3 August 2005) is a professional footballer who plays as a defensive midfielder for Serie A club Inter Milan. Born in Italy, he plays for the Serbia national team. He is a son of former Inter Milan and Serbian international footballer Dejan Stanković.

== Club career ==
=== Inter Milan ===
On 1 October 2022, Stanković made his debut in the Inter Milan first team match day squad, being named on the substitute bench in Serie A match against Roma at the San Siro. He was part of the match day squad, but an unused substitute, as Inter won the 2022–23 Coppa Italia title with a 2–1 victory over Fiorentina.

==== Loan to Luzern ====
On 3 July 2024, Stanković joined Swiss Super League club Luzern on a season-long loan, with an option to buy and a buyback clause in favour of Inter. The same on 26 October, he scored his first goal in a 3–2 defeat against Yverdon Sport.

=== Club Brugge ===
On 24 July 2025, Stanković officially joined Belgian Pro League side Club Brugge, signing a contract until 2029. Inter Milan maintained a buyback option to sign Stanković for €22m in 2026 and €25m in 2027. One month later, on 27 August, he scored his first goal for the club in a 6–0 victory against Rangers in the second leg of the Champions League qualifying play-off round.

=== Return to Inter Milan ===
On 5 June 2026, Inter Milan exercised their €23 million buy-back clause to re-sign Stanković, who subsequently signed a contract with the club until 2031.

== International career ==
In February 2020, Stanković was called up to the Serbia U15 squad. He represented Serbia under-16 and Serbia U17, and became captain of the youth team for the first time in May 2021. Stanković served as captain to the Serbian team that reached the semi-finals of the 2022 UEFA European Under-17 Championship. He received his first call-up in September 2022 and played as captain for the Serbia U18 national team in a 1–0 defeat against Italy U18. Against the same opponent four days later, he scored the first goal in a 2–1 win for his country.

== Style of play ==
Whilst he was captaining the Serbia U17 team to the semi-finals of the 2022 UEFA European Under-17 Championship, Stanković was described by the UEFA website as having set-piece delivery that would "be a menace to any opponent" and "a blend of finesse and fight in midfield [which] makes it clear why he wears the captain's armband".

== Personal life ==
His brother Filip plays as a goalkeeper for Venezia. They are both sons of former Inter and Serbian international footballer Dejan Stanković. His mother Ana is Slovenian, and the family spend some time in Ljubljana. His maternal uncle is a Slovenian former professional footballer Milenko Ačimovič.

On 11 October 2025, Stanković debuted for the Serbian senior team in a 0–1 2026 FIFA World Cup qualification home loss against Albania.

== Career statistics ==
=== Club ===
As of match played 28 October 2026

Appearances and goals by club, season and competition
Club	Season	League			National cup (Note: Includes Swiss Cup, Belgian Cup, Coppa Italia)		Europe		Other		Total	
Club	Season	Division	Apps	Goals	Apps	Goals	Apps	Goals	Apps	Goals	Apps	Goals
Inter Milan	2022–23	Serie A	0	0	0	0	0	0	0	0	0	0
Inter Milan	2023–24	Serie A	0	0	0	0	0	0	0	0	0	0
Inter Milan	Total		0	0	0	0	0	0	0	0	0	0
Luzern (loan)	2024–25	Swiss Super League	38	3	2	0	—		—		40	3
Club Brugge	2025–26	Belgian Pro League	39	6	2	0	14 (Note: Appearances in UEFA Champions League)	3	—		55	9
Inter Milan	2026–27	Serie A	4	0	0	0	2	0	0	0	6	0
Career total			81	9	4	0	16	3	0	0	101	12

=== International ===
As of match played 4 October 2026

Appearances and goals by national team and year
National team	Year	Apps	Goals
Serbia	2025	4	1
Serbia	2026	6	0
Total		10	1

Scores and results list Serbia's goal tally first.

List of international goals scored by Aleksandar Stanković
No.	Date	Venue	Opponent	Score	Result	Competition
1.	16 November 2025	Dubočica Stadium, Leskovac, Serbia	Latvia	2–1	2–1	2026 FIFA World Cup qualification

== Honours ==
Inter Milan

- Coppa Italia: 2022–23
- Supercoppa Italiana: 2023

Club Brugge

- Belgian Pro League: 2025–26

Individual

- Belgian Young Professional Footballer of the Year: 2025–26
