= Christos Tzolis =

Greek footballer (born 2002)

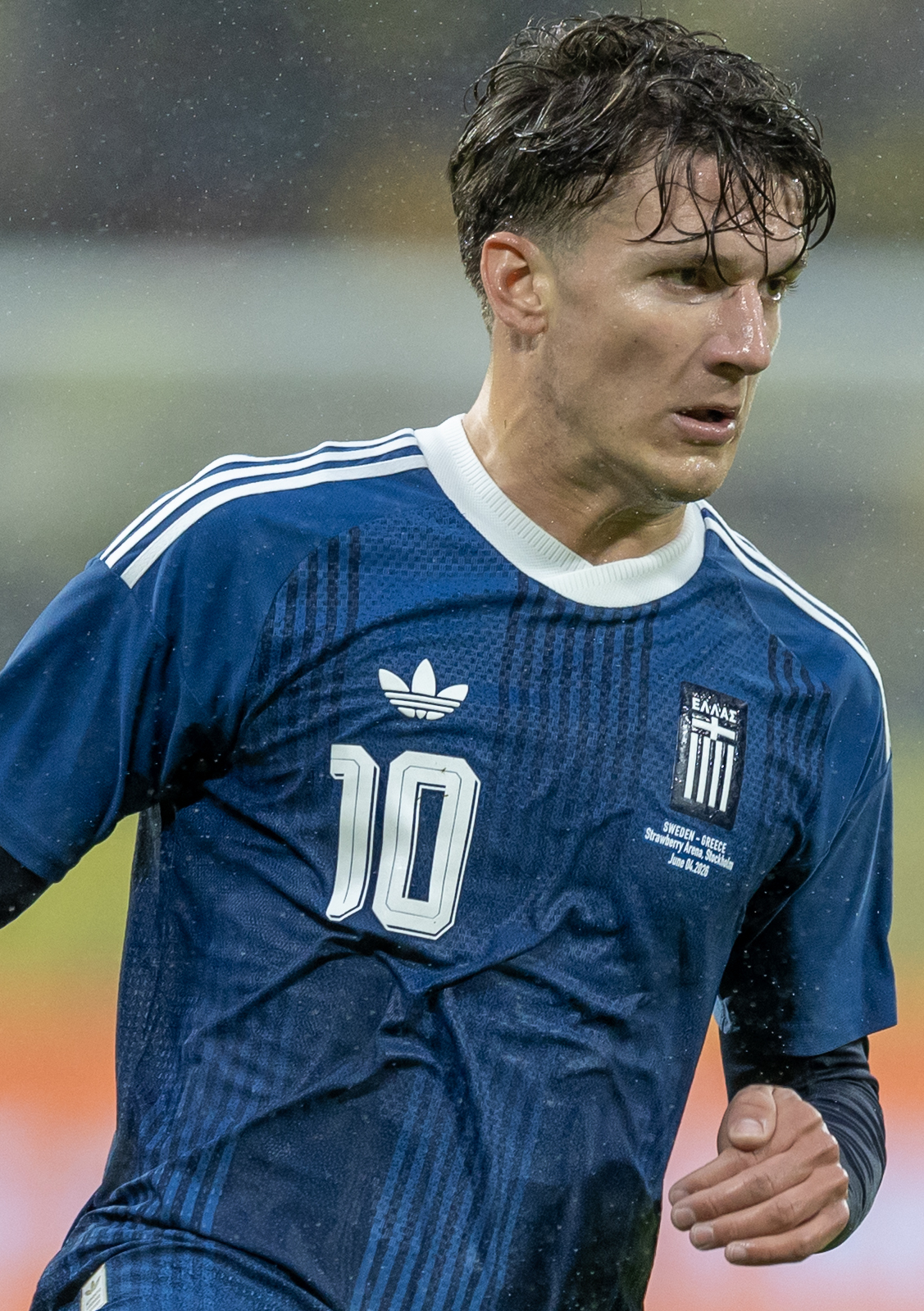
- Tzolis with Greece in 2026

Personal information
- Full name: Christos Tzolis
- Date of birth: 30 January 2002 (age 24)
- Place of birth: Thessaloniki, Greece
- Height: 1.79 m (5 ft 10 in)
- Position: Left winger

Team information
- Current team: Arsenal
- Number: 17

Youth career
- 2006–2010: Doxa Pentalofou
- 2010–2016: PAOK
- 2016–2017: SG Rosenhöhe Offenbach
- 2017–2018: SV Alemannia Königstädten
- 2018–2020: PAOK

Senior career*
Years	Team	Apps	(Gls)
2019–2021	PAOK	42	(7)
2021–2024	Norwich City	27	(1)
2022–2023	→ Twente (loan)	10	(1)
2023–2024	→ Fortuna Düsseldorf (loan)	30	(22)
2024–2026	Club Brugge	74	(33)
2026–	Arsenal	8	(0)

International career^{‡}
2018–2019	Greece U17	12	(6)
2019–2020	Greece U19	3	(0)
2022–2023	Greece U21	7	(6)
2020–	Greece	37	(10)
- * Club domestic league appearances and goals as of 19:42, 21 November 2026 (UTC) ‡ National team caps and goals as of 1 October 2026

Christos Tzolis (Greek: Χρήστος Τζόλης [ˈxristos ˈd͡zolis]; born 30 January 2002) is a Greek professional footballer who plays as a left winger for Premier League club Arsenal and the Greece national team.

Tzolis began his professional career playing for PAOK, before joining Premier League side Norwich City in 2021. After two seasons in England and a loan spell at Twente, Tzolis joined 2. Bundesliga side Fortuna Düsseldorf on loan, where he finished the season as the league's joint-top scorer with 22 goals.

In July 2024, Tzolis joined Belgian side Club Brugge for a reported €6 million. He helped the club win the Belgian Pro League title in the 2025–26 season, scoring 22 goals and providing 29 assists in all competitions, and being named the league's Player of the Season. In 2026, Tzolis joined Arsenal for a reported £34 million.

== Club career ==
=== PAOK ===
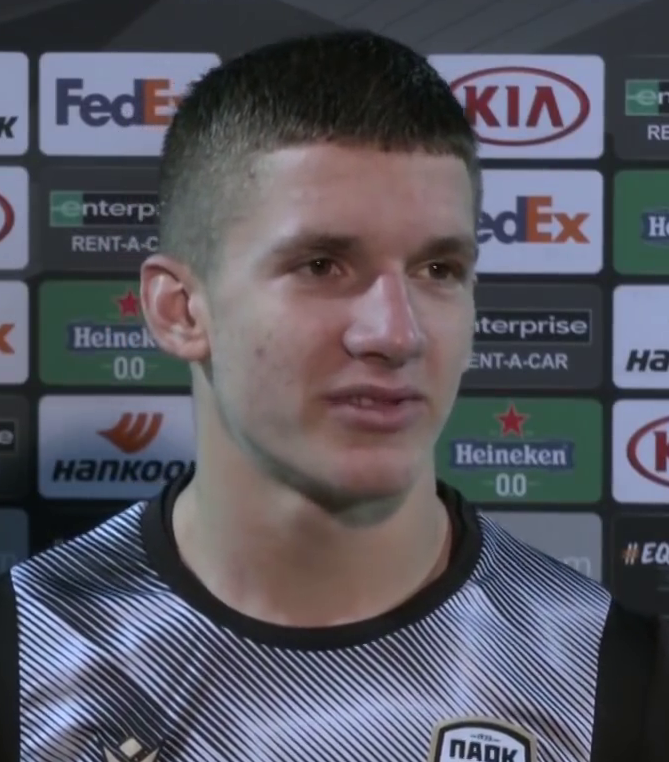
Tzolis with PAOK in 2020

On 25 August 2020, Tzolis scored a brace for 2020–21 UEFA Champions League qualifying phase and play-off round against Beşiktaş. Tzolis also added an assist for Dimitrios Pelkas. On 11 September 2020, he scored the only goal against AEL in the 2020–21 season opener, named MVP of the game. On 17 September 2020, Tzolis renew his contract with the club until 2024 without a buy out clause. On 5 November 2020, he scored in a 4–1 home win 2020–21 UEFA Europa League group stage game against PSV Eindhoven helping PAOK to increase the possibility of qualifying for the next phase of the UEFA Europa League.

=== Norwich City ===
On 12 August 2021, Tzolis left PAOK to join Premier League club Norwich City on a five-year deal for an undisclosed fee. He made an impressive debut for the Canaries on 24 August, as he scored a brace and assisted a further two goals, to help his team seal an emphatic 6–0 win over Bournemouth and progress to the third round of the EFL Cup. Following his impressive performance, manager Daniel Farke praised him as one of Europe's top prospects for his age, highlighting his pace, goal-scoring ability, and potential.

==== Loan to Twente ====
On 22 July 2022, Tzolis joined Twente in the Netherlands on a season-long loan. He returned from his loan spell on 31 January 2023, after a mutual agreement was reached to cut short his loan spell. During his time at Twente, the left winger scored three goals in 15 appearances.

==== Return to Norwich City ====
Tzolis scored his first goal for Norwich since his return from loan, and his first goal for Norwich in the league, in a 3–1 win against Birmingham City on 21 February 2023.

==== Loan to Fortuna Düsseldorf ====
On 6 August 2023, Tzolis moved to 2. Bundesliga club Fortuna Düsseldorf on a one-year loan, with an option to buy. During the 2023–24 season, he finished as one of the league's top scorers with 22 goals, alongside Robert Glatzel and Haris Tabaković. On 30 May 2024, Fortuna Düsseldorf exercised their buy option.

=== Club Brugge ===
On 1 July 2024, Tzolis signed a four-year contract with the Belgian side Club Brugge, for a reported transfer fee of €6 million. He won his first title at the club by achieving the 2024–25 Belgian Cup.

In the 2025–26 season, Tzolis helped Club Brugge win the league title, scoring 23 goals and providing 29 assists in all competitions, while being named Belgian Pro League Player of the Season.

=== Arsenal ===
On 23 July 2026, Arsenal confirmed the signing of Tzolis on a long-term contract, for a reported transfer fee of £34 million. A month later, on 16 August, he provided two assists on his debut in a 3–0 win over Manchester City in the FA Community Shield, becoming the first player to achieve this feat in the competition since David Beckham in 1996.

== International career ==
Tzolis has represented Greece at the under-17 level and under-19 level. At the under-17 level, he appeared in 9 matches and scored 6 goals. On 7 October 2020, Tzolis made his debut for the senior national team in a 2–1 loss to Austria after being substituted on in the 82nd minute for Dimitrios Limnios. At the time of his debut, Tzolis became the 7th youngest player in the history of the Greece national team. On 11 November 2020, Tzolis scored his first international goal in a 2–1 victory against Cyprus.

== Personal life ==
His parents are from Dhrovjan, Vlorë County and belong to the Greek minority in Albania.

== Career statistics ==
=== Club ===
As of match played 7 November 2026

Appearances and goals by club, season and competition
Club	Season	League			National cup (Note: Includes Greek Cup, FA Cup, KNVB Cup, DFB-Pokal, Belgian Cup)		League cup (Note: Includes EFL Cup)		Europe		Other		Total	
Club	Season	Division	Apps	Goals	Apps	Goals	Apps	Goals	Apps	Goals	Apps	Goals	Apps	Goals
PAOK	2019–20	Super League Greece	9	1	1	0	—		0	0	—		10	1
PAOK	2020–21	Super League Greece	33	6	4	5	—		9 (Note: Four appearances and two goals in UEFA Champions League, five appearances and three goals in UEFA Europa League)	5	—		46	16
PAOK	2021–22	Super League Greece	—		—		—		1 (Note: Appearance(s) in UEFA Europa Conference League)	0	—		1	0
PAOK	Total		42	7	5	5	—		10	5	—		57	17
Norwich City	2021–22	Premier League	14	0	1	0	2	2	—		—		17	2
Norwich City	2022–23	Championship	13	1	—		—		—		—		13	1
Norwich City	Total		27	1	1	0	2	2	—		—		30	3
Twente (loan)	2022–23	Eredivisie	10	1	1	0	—		4	2	—		15	3
Fortuna Düsseldorf (loan)	2023–24	2. Bundesliga	30	22	5	2	—		—		—		35	24
Club Brugge	2024–25	Belgian Pro League	38	16	5	3	—		12 (Note: Appearances in UEFA Champions League)	1	1 (Note: Appearance in Belgian Super Cup)	1	56	21
Club Brugge	2025–26	Belgian Pro League	36	17	2	1	—		13	3	1	1	52	22
Club Brugge	Total		74	33	7	4	—		25	4	2	2	108	43
Arsenal	2026–27	Premier League	7	0	0	0	1	0	2	0	1 (Note: Appearance in FA Community Shield)	0	11	0
Career total			190	64	19	11	3	2	41	11	3	2	256	90

=== International ===
As of match played 27 September 2026

Appearances and goals by national team and year
National team	Year	Apps	Goals
Greece	2020	4	1
Greece	2021	9	0
Greece	2022	0	0
Greece	2023	0	0
Greece	2024	7	3
Greece	2025	10	5
Greece	2026	6	1
Total		36	10

Scores and results list Greece's goal tally first, score column indicates score after each Tzolis goal

List of international goals scored by Christos Tzolis
No.	Date	Venue	Cap	Opponent	Score	Result	Competition	Ref.
1	11 November 2020	Georgios Kamaras Stadium, Athens, Greece	2	Cyprus	1–0	2–1	Friendly	
2	11 June 2024	Untersberg-Arena, Grödig, Austria	15	Malta	2–0	2–0	Friendly	
3	10 September 2024	Aviva Stadium, Dublin, Ireland	16	Republic of Ireland	2–0	2–0	2024–25 UEFA Nations League B	
4	17 November 2024	Helsinki Olympic Stadium, Helsinki, Finland	20	Finland	2–0	2–0	2024–25 UEFA Nations League B	
5	23 March 2025	Hampden Park, Glasgow, Scotland	22	Scotland	3–0	3–0	2024–25 UEFA Nations League promotion/relegation play-offs	
6	11 June 2025	Pankritio, Heraklion, Greece	24	Bulgaria	3–0	4–0	Friendly	
7	5 September 2025	Karaiskakis Stadium, Piraeus, Greece	25	Belarus	5–0	5–1	2026 FIFA World Cup qualification	
8	12 October 2025	Parken Stadium, Copenhagen, Denmark	28	Denmark	1–3	1–3	2026 FIFA World Cup qualification	
9	15 November 2025	Karaiskakis Stadium, Piraeus, Greece	29	Scotland	3–0	3–2	2026 FIFA World Cup qualification	
10	24 September 2026	Red Star Stadium, Belgrade, Serbia	35	Serbia	1–1	2–1	2026–27 UEFA Nations League A	

== Honours ==
PAOK

- Greek Cup: 2020–21

Club Brugge

- Belgian Pro League: 2025–26
- Belgian Cup: 2024–25
- Belgian Super Cup: 2025

Arsenal

- FA Community Shield: 2026

Individual

- PAOK Player of the Season: 2020–21
- Super League Greece Young Player of the Season: 2020–21
- Greek Cup top scorer: 2020–21
- 2. Bundesliga top scorer: 2023–24
- Belgian Pro League Goal of the Year: 2025
- Belgian Professional Footballer of the Year: 2025–26
