= Romeo Vermant =

Belgian footballer

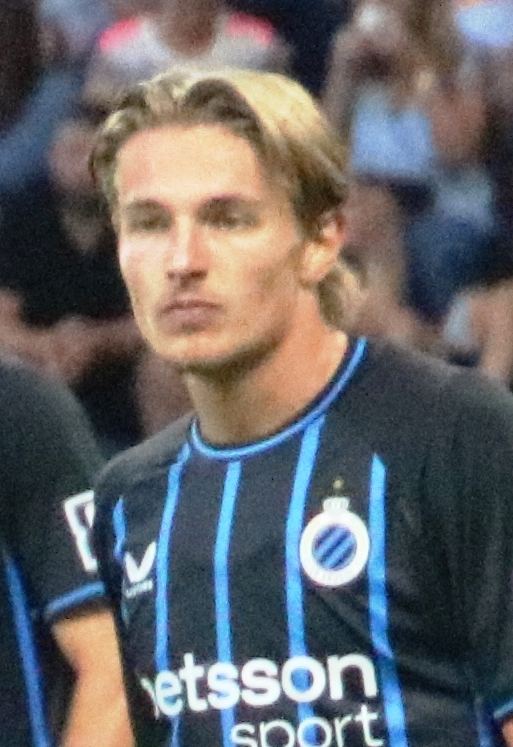
- Vermant with Club Brugge in 2025

Personal information
- Date of birth: 24 January 2004 (age 22)
- Place of birth: Gelsenkirchen, Germany
- Height: 1.84 m (6 ft 0 in)
- Position: Forward

Team information
- Current team: Club Brugge
- Number: 17

Youth career
- 2018–2020: Club Brugge

Senior career*
| Years | Team | Apps | (Gls) |
| 2020– | Club NXT | 48 | (16) |
| 2023– | Club Brugge | 82 | (16) |
| 2024 | → Westerlo (loan) | 12 | (3) |

International career^{‡}
| 2019–2020 | Belgium U16 | 2 | (0) |
| 2021–2022 | Belgium U18 | 4 | (3) |
| 2022–2023 | Belgium U19 | 5 | (2) |
| 2023– | Belgium U21 | 17 | (4) |
| 2025– | Belgium | 1 | (0) |
- * Club domestic league appearances and goals as of 31 October 2026 ‡ National team caps and goals as of 15:36, 18 November 2026 (UTC)

Romeo Vermant (Dutch pronunciation: [ˈvɛrmɑnt]; born 24 January 2004) is a Belgian professional footballer who plays as a forward for Club Brugge and the Belgium national team.

== Club career ==
Vermant began his career at the youth academy of Club Brugge. On 22 January 2021, Vermant made his debut for Brugge's reserve side, Club NXT in the Belgian First Division B against Lierse. On 5 January 2022, he signed a professional contract with the club tying him until 2024.

On 22 January 2024, Vermant moved on loan to Westerlo until the end of the season. Following his return to Club Brugge in the 2024–25 season, he netted his first goal for the club in a 2–1 win over Anderlecht on 27 October, in addition to making his UEFA Champions League debut. On 4 May 2025, he scored a brace in a 2–1 victory over Anderlecht in the Belgian Cup final.

== International career ==
Vermant was called up to the senior Belgium national team for a set of 2026 FIFA World Cup qualification matches in November 2025.

== Personal life ==
Vermant is the son of former Belgian international Sven Vermant. He was born in Gelsenkirchen, Germany when his father was playing for Schalke 04. His maternal grandfather Eric Van Vyve and great-grandfather Marcel Van Vyve were also footballers for Club Brugge, making him a fourth generation footballer.

== Career statistics ==
=== Club ===
As of match played 31 October 2026

Appearances and goals by club, season and competition
| Club | Season | League | | | Belgian Cup | | Europe | | Other | | Total | |
| Club | Season | Division | Apps | Goals | Apps | Goals | Apps | Goals | Apps | Goals | Apps | Goals |
|---|---|---|---|---|---|---|---|---|---|---|---|---|
| Club NXT | 2020–21 | Challenger Pro League | 10 | 1 | — | | — | | — | | 10 | 1 |
| Club NXT | 2022–23 | Challenger Pro League | 26 | 9 | — | | — | | — | | 26 | 9 |
| Club NXT | 2023–24 | Challenger Pro League | 12 | 6 | — | | — | | — | | 12 | 6 |
| Club NXT | Total | | 48 | 16 | — | | — | | — | | 48 | 16 |
| Club Brugge | 2022–23 | Belgian Pro League | 10 | 0 | 0 | 0 | 0 | 0 | — | | 10 | 0 |
| Club Brugge | 2023–24 | Belgian Pro League | 1 | 0 | 0 | 0 | 2 (Note: Appearances in UEFA Europa Conference League) | 0 | — | | 3 | 0 |
| Club Brugge | 2024–25 | Belgian Pro League | 28 | 8 | 3 | 2 | 5 (Note: Appearances in UEFA Champions League) | 0 | 1 (Note: Appearance in Belgian Super Cup) | 0 | 37 | 11 |
| Club Brugge | 2025–26 | Belgian Pro League | 33 | 7 | 1 | 0 | 11 | 4 | 1 | 0 | 46 | 11 |
| Club Brugge | 2026–27 | Belgian Pro League | 10 | 0 | 1 | 0 | 3 | 1 | 1 | 0 | 15 | 1 |
| Club Brugge | Total | | 82 | 16 | 5 | 2 | 21 | 5 | 3 | 0 | 111 | 23 |
| Westerlo (loan) | 2023–24 | Belgian Pro League | 12 | 3 | — | | — | | — | | 12 | 3 |
| Career total | | | 142 | 36 | 5 | 2 | 21 | 5 | 3 | 0 | 171 | 43 |

=== International ===
As of match played 15 November 2025

Appearances and goals by national team and year
| National team | Year | Apps | Goals |
|---|---|---|---|
| Belgium | 2025 | 1 | 0 |
| Total | | 1 | 0 |

== Honours ==
Club Brugge

- Belgian Cup: 2024–25
