= Donatas Rumšas =

Lithuanian football referee

- Born: March 21, 1988 (age 38); Palanga, Lithuanian SSR, Soviet Union
- Occupation: Football referee
- Years active: 2005–

Donatas Rumšas (born 21 March 1988) is a Lithuanian association football referee who officiates in domestic and international competitions, and presently is ranked as a UEFA elite category referee.

== Biography ==
Rumšas was born on 21 March 1988 in Palanga, then part of the Lithuanian SSR in the Soviet Union. He completed secondary education and subsequently studied civil engineering at Klaipėda University, graduating in 2011 with a bachelor's degree.

He began his refereeing career in 2005, initially officiating in Lithuanian domestic football. He has been a regular referee in Lithuania's top division, the A Lyga, since 2011.

In 2016, Rumšas was included on the FIFA International Referees List, enabling him to officiate international matches in UEFA and FIFA competitions. Since then, he has taken charge of matches in UEFA Europa League and UEFA Champions League competitions.

He has officiated club fixtures involving teams from different European leagues, including UEFA Champions League group stage matches in the 2025–26 season. Rumšas also refereed in the UEFA Europa League and qualifying competitions in multiple seasons. He has also officiated matches involving national teams in UEFA Nations League and qualifiers.

== Professional life ==
Alongside his refereeing career, Rumšas has also worked as a civil engineer and project manager in the construction industry.
