= 2020–21 Club Brugge KV season =

Club Brugge
2020–21 season
- President: Bart Verhaeghe
- Manager: Philippe Clement
- Stadium: Jan Breydel Stadium
- Belgian First Division A: 1st
- Belgian Cup: Quarter-finals
- Belgian Super Cup: Cancelled
- UEFA Champions League: Group stage
- UEFA Europa League: Round of 32
- Top goalscorer: League: Noa Lang (16); All: Noa Lang (17)
Home colours	Away colours	Third colours

The 2020–21 season was the 129th season in the existence of Club Brugge KV and the club's 61st consecutive season in the top flight of Belgian football. In addition to the domestic league, Club Brugge participated in this season's editions of the Belgian Cup, the Belgian Super Cup, the UEFA Champions League, and the UEFA Europa League. The season covered the period from 1 July 2020 to 30 June 2021.

== Players ==
=== First-team squad ===
As of 26 February 2021

Note: Flags indicate national team as defined under FIFA eligibility rules; some limited exceptions apply. Players may hold more than one non-FIFA nationality.

No.	Pos.	Nation	Player
2	DF	UKR	Eduard Sobol (on loan from Shakhtar Donetsk)
3	MF	COL	Éder Balanta
5	DF	CIV	Odilon Kossounou
7	FW	NED	Tahith Chong (on loan from Manchester United)
8	MF	MAR	Nabil Dirar (on loan from Fenerbahçe)
10	FW	NED	Noa Lang (on loan from Ajax)
15	DF	CRO	Matej Mitrović
18	DF	URU	Federico Ricca
20	MF	BEL	Hans Vanaken (Vice-captain)
21	FW	NGR	David Okereke
22	GK	USA	Ethan Horvath
24	DF	NED	Stefano Denswil (on loan from Bologna)
25	MF	NED	Ruud Vormer (Captain)

No.	Pos.	Nation	Player
26	MF	BEL	Mats Rits
27	FW	SEN	Youssouph Badji
28	DF	BEL	Ignace Van Der Brempt
29	FW	NED	Bas Dost
30	FW	VEN	Daniel Pérez
33	GK	BEL	Nick Shinton
44	DF	BEL	Brandon Mechele
55	MF	BEL	Maxim De Cuyper
77	DF	ANG	Clinton Mata
88	GK	BEL	Simon Mignolet
90	MF	BEL	Charles De Ketelaere
97	MF	BEL	Thomas Van den Keybus
98	MF	BEL	Cisse Sandra

=== Out on loan ===
No.	Pos.	Nation	Player
1	GK	CRO	Karlo Letica (on loan to (Italy) Sampdoria until 30 June 2021)
9	FW	CZE	Michael Krmenčík (on loan to (Greece) PAOK until 30 June 2021)
17	DF	CIV	Simon Deli (on loan to (Czech Republic) Slavia Prague until 30 June 2021)
19	MF	BEL	Thibault Vlietinck (on loan to (Belgium) OH Leuven until 30 June 2021)

No.	Pos.	Nation	Player
40	DF	BEL	Siemen Voet (on loan to (Belgium) K.V. Mechelen until 30 June 2021)
42	FW	NGR	Emmanuel Dennis (on loan to (Germany) Köln until 30 June 2021)
80	FW	BEL	Loïs Openda (on loan to (Netherlands) Vitesse until 30 June 2021)
—	FW	IRI	Kaveh Rezaei (on loan to (Belgium) Charleroi until 30 June 2021)

== Transfers ==
=== In ===
No.	Pos	Player	Transferred from	Fee	Date	Source
15			TBD		1 July 2020	

=== Out ===
No.	Pos	Player	Transferred to	Fee	Date	Source
15			TBD		1 July 2020	

== Pre-season and friendlies ==
Win Draw Loss Fixtures

4 August 2020 Friendly	Club Brugge (Belgium)	3–0	(Luxembourg) Union Titus Pétange	Knokke-Heist, Belgium
15:00 CEST (UTC+2)	Krmenčík 5', 14', 36'			Stadium: Complex Molenhoek

== Competitions ==
=== Overview ===
Competition	First match	Last match	Starting round	Final position	Record							
Competition	First match	Last match	Starting round	Final position	Pld	W	D	L	GF	GA	GD	Win %
Belgian First Division A	8 August 2020	23 May 2021	Matchday 1	Winners	40	25	7	8	81	37	+44	62.50
Belgian Cup	3 February 2021	4 March 2021	Sixth round	Quarter-finals	3	2	0	1	9	3	+6	66.67
UEFA Champions League	20 October 2020	8 December 2020	Group stage	Group stage	6	2	2	2	8	10	−2	33.33
UEFA Europa League	18 February 2021	25 February 2021	Round of 32	Round of 32	2	0	1	1	1	2	−1	0.00
Total					51	29	10	12	99	52	+47	56.86

Last updated: 23 May 2021
Source: Soccerway

=== Belgian First Division A ===
==== Regular season ====
Pos	Team	Pld	W	D	L	GF	GA	GD	Pts	Qualification or relegation
1	Club Brugge (C)	34	24	4	6	73	26	+47	76	Qualification for the Europa Conference League and Play-offs I (Note: The regular season winners will qualify for the 2021–22 UEFA Europa Conference League if they do not qualify for the 2021–22 UEFA Champions League in the playoffs or for the 2021–22 UEFA Europa League through the 2020–21 Belgian Cup.)
2	Antwerp	34	18	6	10	57	48	+9	60	Qualification for the Play-offs I
3	Anderlecht	34	15	13	6	51	34	+17	58	Qualification for the Play-offs I
4	Genk (Note: Genk qualifies for at least the play-off round of the Europa League through winning the 2021 Belgian Cup.)	34	16	8	10	67	48	+19	56	Qualification for the Play-offs I
5	Oostende (Note: On 14 April 2021 news was released that both Excel Mouscron and Oostende had not received a Belgian professional football license for the coming season, a requirement to play at the top two levels of Belgian football. For Oostende, a lack of financial transparency, together with generally poor quality and incompleteness of the submitted report, was given as the main reason by the committee for not awarding a license, while Excel Mouscron was refused a license as besides insufficient transparency, the committee also questioned several cash flows and whether the club was creditworthy in general, also due to the fact that the wages for the months of February and March had not yet been paid at that point. For Excel Mouscron, it was already the sixth year running the license was (initially) refused, however, the club has appealed the decision with the Belgian Court for Sports Arbitrage (BAS) successfully on each occasion and intended to do so again. Oostende was planning to launch an appeal as well, with the BAS to rule on the matter for both clubs before the 10th of May. Both clubs were allowed to add new documents to their case, but in case they however still did not receive a license after appeal, knew they would have been forced to relegate to the 2021–22 Belgian Division 2 and start the season with a 3-point penalty. Both Excel Mouscron and Oostende were however eventually awarded a license after appeal, meaning Oostende remained at the top level, while Excel Mouscron only dropped one level.)	34	15	8	11	49	41	+8	53	Qualification for the Play-offs II

Source: Jupiler Pro League (in Dutch), Soccerway
Rules for classification: 1) Points; 2) Matches won; 3) Goal difference; 4) Goals scored; 5) Away matches won; 6) Away goal difference; 7) Away goals scored; 8) Play-off.
(C) Champions

==== Results summary ====
Overall								Home						Away					
Pld	W	D	L	GF	GA	GD	Pts	W	D	L	GF	GA	GD	W	D	L	GF	GA	GD
34	24	4	6	73	26	+47	76	13	1	4	36	15	+21	11	3	2	37	11	+26

Last updated: 18 April 2021.
Source: Jupiler Pro League

==== Results by round ====
Round	1	2	3	4	5	6	7	8	9	10	11	12	13	14	15	16	17	18	19	20	21	22	23	24	25	26	27	28	29	30	31	32	33	34
Ground	H	A	H	A	H	A	H	H	A	A	H	A	H	A	H	A	H	A	H	A	H	A	H	A	H	A	H	A	H	A	H	A	A	H
Result	L	W	L	W	W	W	W	W	D	L	D	W	W	D	W	W	L	W	W	W	W	W	W	W	W	D	W	W	W	W	L	W	L	W
Position	17	7	11	5	4	3	2	2	1	2	5	1	1	3	2	1	1	1	1	1	1	1	1	1	1	1	1	1	1	1	1	1	1	1

Updated to match(es) played on 18 April 2021. Source: Jupiler Pro League
A = Away; H = Home; W = Win; D = Draw; L = Loss

==== Matches ====
The league fixtures were announced on 8 July 2020.

8 August 2020 1	Club Brugge	0–1	Charleroi	Bruges
16:30 CEST (UTC+2)	Sobol (yellow card) 42'; Dennis (yellow card) 54'	Report	Ilaimaharitra (yellow card) 17'; Busi (yellow card) 35'; Willems (yellow card) 64'; Morioka 78'	Stadium: Jan Breydel Stadium; Attendance: 0 Referee: Lawrence Visser

16 August 2020 2	Eupen	0–4	Club Brugge	Eupen
16:00 CEST (UTC+2)		Report	Badji 14'; Diatta 59', 69'; Vormer 76'	Stadium: Kehrwegstadion; Attendance: 0 Referee: Erik Lambrechts

23 August 2020 3	Club Brugge	0–1	Beerschot	Bruges
16:00 CEST (UTC+2)	Balanta (yellow card) 76'	Report	Holzhauser 28'	Stadium: Jan Breydel Stadium; Attendance: 0 Referee: Alexandre Boucaut

30 August 2020 4	Genk	1–2	Club Brugge	Genk
13:30 CEST (UTC+2)	Kouassi (yellow card) 54'; Bongonda 60' (pen.); Mæhle (yellow card) 81'; Uronen (yellow card) 90'; Arteaga (yellow card) 90+6'	Report	Vanaken 22'; Deli (yellow card) 28'; Mignolet (yellow card) 60'; Vormer (yellow card) 80'; Badji 83'	Stadium: Luminus Arena; Attendance: 0 Referee: Bram van Driessche

12 September 2020 5	Club Brugge	4–1	Waasland-Beveren	Bruges
20:45 CEST (UTC+2)	Vanaken 16' (pen.), 39'; Okereke 50'; Dennis (yellow card) 52'; Krmenčík 84'	Report	Heymans 30'; Sula (yellow card) 34'; Schoonbaert (yellow card) 40'	Stadium: Jan Breydel Stadium; Attendance: 9,200; Referee: Erik Lambrechts

20 September 2020 6	Zulte Waregem	0–6	Club Brugge	Waregem
13:30 CEST (UTC+2)	Humphreys (yellow card) 84'	Report	Deschacht 6' (o.g.); Krmenčík 19', 41'; Vanaken 31'; De Ketelaere 67'; Balanta 74'; Kossounou (yellow card) 81'	Stadium: Regenboogstadion; Referee: Nathan Verboomen

27 September 2020 7	Club Brugge	2–1	Cercle Brugge	Bruges
18:15 CEST (UTC+2)	Diatta 22'; Deli 68'; Krmenčík (yellow card) 90+6'	Report	Musaba 46'; Marcelin (yellow card) 58'; Hazard (yellow card) 69'	Stadium: Jan Breydel Stadium; Attendance: 9,500; Referee: Lawrence Visser

4 October 2020 8	Club Brugge	3–0	Anderlecht	Bruges
13:30 CEST (UTC+2)	Diatta 23'; Vanaken 48' (pen.); Rits (yellow card) 63'; Vormer 90+4'	Report	Sambi Lokonga (yellow card) 47' (yellow-red card) 72'; Luckassen (yellow card) 58'; Arnstad (yellow card) 85'	Stadium: Jan Breydel Stadium; Attendance: 9,000; Referee: Erik Lambrechts

17 October 2020 9	Standard Liège	1–1	Club Brugge	Liège
20:45 CEST (UTC+2)	Lestienne (yellow card) 20'; Gavory 90+3' (pen.); Raskin (yellow card) 90+7'	Report	Mata (yellow card) 33'; Diatta 40'; Rits (yellow card) 71'; Badji (yellow card) 90+7'	Stadium: Stade Maurice Dufrasne; Attendance: 10,000; Referee: Nicolas Laforge

24 October 2020 10	OH Leuven	2–1	Club Brugge	Leuven
20:45 CEST (UTC+2)	Henry 21' (pen.); Malinov (yellow card) 30'; Duplus (yellow card) 39'; Mercier 57'	Report	Ricca (yellow card) 12'; Sobol (yellow card) 19'; Lang 45' (pen.), (yellow card) 55'	Stadium: Den Dreef; Attendance: 0 Referee: Alexandre Boucaut

31 October 2020 11	Club Brugge	2–2	KV Mechelen	Bruges
20:45 CET (UTC+1)	Vormer 13', (yellow card) 20'; Lang 28'	Report	De Camargo 42'; Schoofs 81'	Stadium: Jan Breydel Stadium; Attendance: 0 Referee: Jonathan Lardot

8 November 2020 12	Oostende	1–3	Club Brugge	Ostend
16:00 CET (UTC+1)	Gueye 38'; Bataille (yellow card) 59' (yellow-red card) 76'; Ndicka (yellow card) 68'	Report	Rits 32'; Diatta 81'; Badji 90'	Stadium: Versluys Arena; Attendance: 0 Referee: Kevin Van Damme

21 November 2020 13	Club Brugge	1–0	Kortrijk	Bruges
20:45 CET (UTC+1)	Lang 60'	Report	Van der Bruggen (yellow card) 23'; Stojanović (yellow card) 55'; Sainsbury (yellow card) 68'	Stadium: Jan Breydel Stadium; Attendance: 0 Referee: Lothar D'Hondt

28 November 2020 14	Excel Mouscron	0–0	Club Brugge	Mouscron
20:45 CET (UTC+1)	Capita (yellow card) 76'; Mohamed (yellow card) 82'	Report	Dennis (yellow card) 87'; Balanta (yellow card) 87'; Mata (yellow card) 90+4'	Stadium: Stade Le Canonnier; Attendance: 0 Referee: Wesli De Cremer

5 December 2020 15	Club Brugge	1–0	Sint-Truiden	Bruges
20:45 CET (UTC+1)	Okereke 57'	Report	Konaté (yellow card) 59'	Stadium: Jan Breydel Stadium; Attendance: 0 Referee: Bert Put

13 December 2020 16	Antwerp	0–2	Club Brugge	Antwerp
13:30 CET (UTC+1)	Gelin (red card) 16'; Hongla (yellow card) 50'; Batubinsika (yellow card) 78'; Mbokani (yellow card) 83'	Report	Diatta 2'; Rits 49'; Balanta (yellow card) 56'	Stadium: Bosuilstadion; Attendance: 0 Referee: Nicolas Laforge

17 December 2020 18	KV Mechelen	0–3	Club Brugge	Mechelen
20:45 CET (UTC+1)	Peyre (yellow card) 41'; Storm (yellow card) 45'; Bushiri (yellow card) 63'	Report	Diatta 69', 74'; Okereke 89'	Stadium: Achter de Kazerne; Attendance: 0 Referee: Jonathan Lardot

20 December 2020 17	Club Brugge	0–1	Gent	Bruges
13:30 CET (UTC+1)	Vanaken (yellow card) 47'; Deli (yellow card) 62'; Lang (yellow card) 83'	Report	Mohammadi (yellow card) 26'; Dorsch (yellow card) 64'; Ricca 68' (o.g.); Kleindienst (yellow card) 90+2'	Stadium: Jan Breydel Stadium; Attendance: 0 Referee: Erik Lambrechts

26 December 2020 19	Club Brugge	3–0	Eupen	Bruges
20:00 CET (UTC+1)	Lang 52', 58'; Vanaken (red card) 79'; Okereke 82'	Report	Cools (yellow card) 45+2'; Koch (yellow card) 49'	Stadium: Jan Breydel Stadium; Attendance: 0 Referee: Nathan Verboomen

10 January 2021 30	Sint-Truiden	1–2	Club Brugge	Sint-Truiden
20:45 CET (UTC+1)	De Ridder (yellow card) 51'; Buatu 55'; Nazon (red card) 86'	Report	Dost 13'; Lang 35'; Mechele (yellow card) 42'; Balanta (yellow card) 77'	Stadium: Stayen; Attendance: 0 Referee: Bert Put

17 January 2021 20	Beerschot	0–3	Club Brugge	Antwerp
18:15 CET (UTC+1)	Van den Buijs (yellow card) 43'; Coulibaly (yellow card) 66'; Van den Bergh (yellow card) 67'	Report	Dost 15'; Kossounou 19'; Sobol (yellow card) 48'; Lang 82', (yellow card) 83'	Stadium: Olympisch Stadion; Attendance: 0 Referee: Lothar D'hondt

20 January 2021 25	Club Brugge	2–1	Oostende	Bruges
21:00 CET (UTC+1)	Lang (yellow card) 32'; Dost 38'; Diatta 49'	Report	Mata 14' (o.g.); Jäkel (yellow card) 40'; Sakala (penalty missed) 52'	Stadium: Jan Breydel Stadium; Attendance: 0 Referee: Wim Smet

24 January 2021 21	Club Brugge	3–2	Genk	Bruges
13:30 CET (UTC+1)	Dost 7'; Vormer 65'; Mechele 77'	Report	Ito 24'; Toma 34'; Thorstvedt (yellow card) 90+3'	Stadium: Jan Breydel Stadium; Attendance: 0 Referee: Lawrence Visser

28 January 2021 22	Cercle Brugge	1–2	Club Brugge	Bruges
18:45 CET (UTC+1)	Musaba 28'	Report	Mechele 37'; Denswil (yellow card) 54'; Lang 58'; Rits (yellow card) 79'	Stadium: Jan Breydel Stadium; Attendance: 0 Referee: Nathan Verboomen

31 January 2021 23	Club Brugge	3–1	Standard Liège	Bruges
13:30 CET (UTC+1)	Vanaken 19'; Dost 41'; Lang 49'; Kossounou (yellow card) 73'	Report	Bokadi 3'; Bastien (yellow card) 62'; Carcela (yellow card) 88'; Dussenne (yellow card) 88'; Pavlovic (yellow card) 90+2'	Stadium: Jan Breydel Stadium; Attendance: 0 Referee: Nicolas Laforge

6 February 2021 24	Waasland-Beveren	0–2	Club Brugge	Beveren
18:30 CET (UTC+1)	Vieira (yellow card) 65'; Vukotić (yellow card) 84'	Report	Lang 12', 90+4'	Stadium: Freethiel Stadion; Attendance: 0 Referee: Alexandre Boucaut

22 February 2021 27	Club Brugge	3–0	OH Leuven	Bruges
20:45 CET (UTC+1)	Van Der Brempt 8', (yellow card) 67'; Vormer 39' (pen.); Mata 90+3'	Report	Hubert (yellow card) 50'; Jemelka (yellow card) 76'; Asante (yellow card) 86'	Stadium: Jan Breydel Stadium; Attendance: 0 Referee: Jan Boterberg

7 March 2021 29	Club Brugge	3–0	Zulte Waregem	Bruges
16:00 CET (UTC+1)	Badji 21'; Sobol 37'; Lang 63'	Report	Govea (yellow card) 76'	Stadium: Jan Breydel Stadium; Attendance: 0 Referee: Kevin Van Damme

12 March 2021 26	Charleroi	1–1	Club Brugge	Charleroi
20:45 CET (UTC+1)	Dessoleil (yellow card) 57'; Kipré (yellow card) 64'; Nicholson 90'; Vranješ (yellow card) 90+2'	Report	Dessoleil 7' (o.g.)	Stadium: Stade du Pays de Charleroi; Attendance: 0 Referee: Lothar D'hondt
Note: The match was originally scheduled for 14 February 2021, but was postponed due to unsuitable ground.

15 March 2021 28	Gent	0–4	Club Brugge	Ghent
20:45 CET (UTC+1)		Report	Vanaken (yellow card) 19'; Dost 52', 67'; De Ketelaere 63'; Pérez 81'	Stadium: Ghelamco Arena; Attendance: 0 Referee: Bram van Driessche
Note: The match was originally scheduled for 28 February 2021, but was postponed after more than seven Club Brugge players tested positive for COVID-19.

21 March 2021 31	Club Brugge	0–2	Antwerp	Bruges
13:30 CET (UTC+1)	Mata (yellow card) 40'; Lang (yellow card) 46' (yellow-red card) 89'; Mechele (yellow card) 60'	Report	Lamkel Zé 9'; Hongla (yellow card) 32'; Refaelov 43' (pen.); De Pauw (yellow card) 60'	Stadium: Jan Breydel Stadium; Attendance: 0 Referee: Nicolas Laforge

3 April 2021 32	Kortrijk	1–2	Club Brugge	Kortrijk
20:45 CEST (UTC+2)	Gano 18'; Sissoko (yellow card) 45+2'; Ocansey (yellow card) 63'; Selemani (yellow card) 73'; Golubović (yellow card) 90'	Report	Sobol 21'; Vormer (yellow card) 52'; Vanaken 77' (pen.); Pérez (yellow card) 90'	Stadium: Guldensporen Stadion; Attendance: 0 Referee: Jasper Vergoote

11 April 2021 33	Anderlecht	2–1	Club Brugge	Anderlecht
18:15 CEST (UTC+2)	Nmecha 72'; Lokonga 76'; Miazga (yellow card) 90'	Report	Kossounou (yellow card) 49'; Lang 53'; Sobol (yellow card) 79'; Mata (yellow card) 81'	Stadium: Constant Vanden Stock Stadium; Attendance: 0 Referee: Lawrence Visser

18 April 2021 34	Club Brugge	4–2	Excel Mouscron	Bruges
18:00 CEST (UTC+2)	Mata (yellow card) 9'; De Ketelaere 55'; Vanaken 64'; Lang 85'; Dost 89'	Report	Harbaoui (yellow card) 47', (goal) 51'; Silvestre 72'	Stadium: Jan Breydel Stadium; Attendance: 0 Referee: Jonathan Lardot

==== Play-Off I ====
Pos	Team	Pld	W	D	L	GF	GA	GD	Pts	Qualification or relegation	CLU	GNK	ANT	AND
1	Club Brugge (C)	6	1	3	2	8	11	−3	44	Qualification for the Champions League group stage	—	1–2	2–1	2–2
2	Genk	6	5	1	0	15	5	+10	44	Qualification for the Champions League third qualifying round	3–0	—	4–0	1–1
3	Antwerp	6	1	2	3	6	11	−5	35	Qualification for the Europa League play-off round	0–0	2–3	—	1–0
4	Anderlecht	6	0	4	2	9	11	−2	33	Qualification for the Europa Conference League third qualifying round	3–3	1–2	2–2	—

Source: Jupiler Pro League (in Dutch), Soccerway
Legend: Blue = home team win; Yellow = draw; Red = away team win.
Rules for classification: 1) Points; 2) Points without (possible) half points added due to rounding; 3) Regular season finishing position.
(C) Champions

==== Results summary ====
Overall								Home						Away					
Pld	W	D	L	GF	GA	GD	Pts	W	D	L	GF	GA	GD	W	D	L	GF	GA	GD
6	1	3	2	8	11	−3	6	1	1	1	5	5	0	0	2	1	3	6	−3

Last updated: 23 May 2021.
Source: Jupiler Pro League

==== Results by round ====
Round	1	2	3	4	5	6
Ground	H	A	A	H	A	H
Result	D	L	D	W	D	L
Position	1	1	1	1	1	1

Updated to match(es) played on 23 May 2021. Source: Jupiler Pro League
A = Away; H = Home; W = Win; D = Draw; L = Loss

==== Matches ====
2 May 2021 1	Club Brugge	2–2	Anderlecht	Bruges
18:30 CEST (UTC+2)	Kossounou (yellow card) 37'; Lang 49'; Vormer (yellow card) 65'; Vanaken (yellow card) 84'; Dost 89'	Report	Nmecha 64'; Cobbaut (yellow card) 76'; Cullen (yellow card) 78'; Bruun Larsen 86'	Stadium: Jan Breydel Stadium; Attendance: 0 Referee: Jonathan Lardot

7 May 2021 2	Genk	3–0	Club Brugge	Genk
20:45 CEST (UTC+2)	Onuachu 57', (yellow card) 68'; Ito 74'; Thorstvedt 75'	Report	Vanaken (yellow card) 69'; Lang (yellow card) 81'; Sobol (yellow card) 84'	Stadium: Luminus Arena; Attendance: 0 Referee: Lawrence Visser

13 May 2021 3	Antwerp	0–0	Club Brugge	Antwerp
18:30 CEST (UTC+2)	Verstraete (yellow card) 75'	Report	Mata (yellow card) 38'; Lang (yellow card) 75'	Stadium: Bosuilstadion; Attendance: 0 Referee: Bram van Driessche

16 May 2021 4	Club Brugge	2–1	Antwerp	Bruges
18:30 CEST (UTC+2)	Balanta (yellow card) 34'; Butez 60' (o.g.); Vanaken 66' (pen.); Van Der Brempt (yellow card) 81'	Report	Le Marchand (yellow card) 12'; Hongla (yellow card) 45'; Mbokani 62', (yellow card) 89'; De Laet (yellow card) 82'	Stadium: Jan Breydel Stadium; Attendance: 0 Referee: Nicolas Laforge

20 May 2021 5	Anderlecht	3–3	Club Brugge	Anderlecht
21:00 CEST (UTC+2)	Nmecha 45+2' (pen.), 65', (yellow card) 76'; Sambi Lokonga (yellow card) 87'; Bruun Larsen 90+4'	Report	Vanaken 13', 54'; Lang 57'; Balanta (yellow card) 70'	Stadium: Constant Vanden Stock Stadium; Attendance: 0 Referee: Lawrence Visser

23 May 2021 6	Club Brugge	1–2	Genk	Bruges
18:30 CEST (UTC+2)	Vanaken (penalty missed) 34'; Sobol (yellow card) 71'; Vormer 80'	Report	Toma 61'; Dessers 85' (pen.)	Stadium: Jan Breydel Stadium; Attendance: 0 Referee: Kevin Van Damme

=== Belgian Cup ===
3 February 2021 Sixth round	Club Brugge	6–1	Olsa Brakel	Bruges
19:30 CET (UTC+1)	Vanaken 2'; Badji 21', 60', 74'; Nelis 51' (o.g.); Chong 69'	Report	Haezebroeck 9', (yellow card) 56'	Stadium: Jan Breydel Stadium; Attendance: 0

10 February 2021 Seventh round	Club Brugge	3–1	Antwerp	Bruges
20:45 CET (UTC+1)	Vanaken 49'; Dost 81'; Vormer 85'	Report	Verstraete (yellow card) 33'; De Laet (yellow card) 43'; Seck (yellow card) 62'; Lamkel Zé 83'	Stadium: Jan Breydel Stadium; Attendance: 0 Referee: Erik Lambrechts

4 March 2021 Quarter-finals	Standard Liège	1–0	Club Brugge	Liège
20:45 CET (UTC+1)	Muleka (yellow card) 39', (goal) 49'; Bodart (yellow card) 74'; Siquet (yellow card) 78'; Amallah (yellow card) 79'; Laifis (yellow card) 90+4'	Report	Mechele (yellow card) 45'; Kossounou (red card) 81'; Balanta (yellow card) 88'	Stadium: Stade Maurice Dufrasne; Attendance: 0 Referee: Nathan Verboomen

=== UEFA Champions League ===
==== Group stage ====
The group stage draw was held on 1 October 2020.

Pos	Team	Pld	W	D	L	GF	GA	GD	Pts	Qualification	DOR	LAZ	BRU	ZEN
1	(Germany) Borussia Dortmund	6	4	1	1	12	5	+7	13	Advance to knockout phase	—	1–1	3–0	2–0
2	(Italy) Lazio	6	2	4	0	11	7	+4	10	Advance to knockout phase	3–1	—	2–2	3–1
3	(Belgium) Club Brugge	6	2	2	2	8	10	−2	8	Transfer to Europa League	0–3	1–1	—	3–0
4	(Russia) Zenit Saint Petersburg	6	0	1	5	4	13	−9	1		1–2	1–1	1–2	—

Source: UEFA
Rules for classification: Group stage tiebreakers

20 October 2020 1	Zenit Saint Petersburg (Russia)	1–2	(Belgium) Club Brugge	Saint Petersburg, Russia
18:55 CEST (UTC+2)	Lovren (yellow card) 53'; Horvath 74' (o.g.)	Report	Mata (yellow card) 12'; Dennis (yellow card) 14', (goal) 63'; Rits (yellow card) 33'; Vanaken (yellow card) 85'; De Ketelaere 90+3'	Stadium: Krestovsky Stadium; Attendance: 16,682; Referee: Benoît Bastien (France)

28 October 2020 2	Club Brugge (Belgium)	1–1	(Italy) Lazio	Bruges, Belgium
21:00 CET (UTC+1)	Diatta (yellow card) 32'; Vanaken 42' (pen.); Dennis (yellow card) 69'; Rits (yellow card) 88'	Report	Correa 14'; Farès (yellow card) 35'; Patric (yellow card) 40'; Hoedt (yellow card) 45'; Akpa Akpro (yellow card) 59'; Czyż (yellow card) 76'	Stadium: Jan Breydel Stadium; Attendance: 0 (Note: Due to the COVID-19 pandemic in Europe, the match was played behind closed doors.); Referee: Anthony Taylor (England)

4 November 2020 3	Club Brugge (Belgium)	0–3	(Germany) Borussia Dortmund	Bruges, Belgium
21:00 CET (UTC+1)		Report	Hazard 14'; Haaland 18', 32'	Stadium: Jan Breydel Stadium; Attendance: 0 Referee: Damir Skomina (Slovenia)

24 November 2020 4	Borussia Dortmund (Germany)	3–0	(Belgium) Club Brugge	Dortmund, Germany
21:00 CET (UTC+1)	Haaland 18', 60'; Sancho 45'	Report	Rits (yellow card) 71'	Stadium: Westfalenstadion; Attendance: 0 Referee: Ivan Kružliak (Slovakia)

2 December 2020 5	Club Brugge (Belgium)	3–0	(Russia) Zenit Saint Petersburg	Bruges, Belgium
21:00 CET (UTC+1)	De Ketelaere 33'; Vanaken 58' (pen.); Lang 73'	Report	Sutormin (yellow card) 67'; Prokhin (yellow card) 90'	Stadium: Jan Breydel Stadium; Attendance: 0 Referee: Serdar Gözübüyük (Netherlands)

8 December 2020 6	Lazio (Italy)	2–2	(Belgium) Club Brugge	Rome, Italy
18:55 CET (UTC+1)	Correa 12'; Immobile 27' (pen.); Hoedt (yellow card) 36'; Marušić (yellow card) 90'	Report	Sobol (yellow card) 2' (yellow-red card) 39'; Vormer 15'; Vanaken 76'	Stadium: Stadio Olimpico; Attendance: 0 Referee: Cüneyt Çakır (Turkey)

=== UEFA Europa League ===
==== Knockout phase ====
===== Round of 32 =====
The draw for the round of 32 was held on 14 December 2020.

18 February 2021 First leg	Dynamo Kyiv (Ukraine)	1–1	(Belgium) Club Brugge	Kyiv, Ukraine
16:00 CET (UTC+1) (Note: The Dynamo Kyiv v Club Brugge match, originally scheduled at 18:55 CET (19:55 EET), was moved to 16:00 CET (17:00 EET), due to the very cold temperatures.)	Shaparenko (yellow card) 28'; Buyalskyi 62'; Mykolenko (yellow card) 90+3'	Report	Ricca (yellow card) 32'; Mechele 67'	Stadium: NSC Olimpiyskiy Stadium; Referee: Mattias Gestranius (Finland)

25 February 2021 Second leg	Club Brugge (Belgium)	0–1 (1–2 agg.)	(Ukraine) Dynamo Kyiv	Bruges, Belgium
21:00 CET (UTC+1)	Van den Keybus (yellow card) 19'	Report	Besyedin (yellow card) 49'; Buyalskyi 83'	Stadium: Jan Breydel Stadium; Referee: Srđan Jovanović (Serbia)

== Statistics ==
=== Squad appearances and goals ===
Last updated on 23 May 2021.

No.	Pos	Nat	Player	Total		Belgian Division		Belgian Cup		UEFA Champions League		UEFA Europa League	
No.	Pos	Nat	Player	Apps	Goals	Apps	Goals	Apps	Goals	Apps	Goals	Apps	Goals
Goalkeepers
22	GK	(United States) USA	Ethan Horvath	4	0	2	0	1	0	1	0	0	0
33	GK	(Belgium) BEL	Nick Shinton	0	0	0	0	0	0	0	0	0	0
88	GK	(Belgium) BEL	Simon Mignolet	47	0	38	0	2	0	5	0	2	0
91	GK	(Belgium) BEL	Senne Lammens	0	0	0	0	0	0	0	0	0	0
Defenders
2	DF	(Ukraine) UKR	Eduard Sobol	37	2	26+4	2	1	0	4+1	0	1	0
5	DF	(Ivory Coast) CIV	Odilon Kossounou	42	1	30+3	1	2	0	5	0	2	0
15	DF	(Croatia) CRO	Matej Mitrović	7	0	4+2	0	1	0	0	0	0	0
18	DF	(Uruguay) URU	Federico Ricca	20	0	9+5	0	1	0	3	0	2	0
24	DF	(Netherlands) NED	Stefano Denswil	15	0	5+7	0	2+1	0	0	0	0	0
28	DF	(Belgium) BEL	Ignace Van Der Brempt	14	1	4+5	1	2	0	0+1	0	0+2	0
44	DF	(Belgium) BEL	Brandon Mechele	42	3	35	2	2+1	0	2	0	2	1
75	DF	(Belgium) BEL	Noah Mbamba	1	0	1	0	0	0	0	0	0	0
77	DF	(Angola) ANG	Clinton Mata	49	1	36+3	1	2	0	6	0	2	0
Midfielders
3	MF	(Colombia) COL	Éder Balanta	34	1	13+12	1	2+1	0	3+1	0	2	0
8	MF	(Morocco) MAR	Nabil Dirar	5	0	0+2	0	0+1	0	0	0	2	0
20	MF	(Belgium) BEL	Hans Vanaken	45	16	34+2	11	3	2	6	3	0	0
25	MF	(Netherlands) NED	Ruud Vormer	47	8	36+1	6	2	1	6	1	2	0
26	MF	(Belgium) BEL	Mats Rits	44	2	32+5	2	1+1	0	3+2	0	0	0
55	MF	(Belgium) BEL	Maxim De Cuyper	3	0	0	0	0+1	0	0	0	0+2	0
90	MF	(Belgium) BEL	Charles De Ketelaere	46	6	26+12	4	1	0	5+1	2	1	0
97	MF	(Belgium) BEL	Thomas Van Den Keybus	5	0	0+2	0	1	0	0+1	0	1	0
98	MF	(Belgium) BEL	Cisse Sandra	0	0	0	0	0	0	0	0	0	0
Forwards
7	FW	(Netherlands) NED	Tahith Chong	13	1	5+5	0	2+1	1	0	0	0	0
10	FW	(Netherlands) NED	Noa Lang	37	17	26+3	16	1+1	0	4+2	1	0	0
21	FW	(Nigeria) NGR	David Okereke	35	4	7+21	4	1+1	0	0+3	0	1+1	0
27	FW	(Senegal) SEN	Youssouph Badji	32	7	12+14	4	2	3	0+2	0	0+2	0
29	FW	(Netherlands) NED	Bas Dost	22	10	17+2	9	1	1	0	0	2	0
30	FW	(Venezuela) VEN	Daniel Pérez	8	1	0+7	1	0+1	0	0	0	0	0
Players who have made an appearance this season but have left the club
17	DF	(Ivory Coast) CIV	Simon Deli	17	1	11+2	1	0	0	3+1	0	0	0
11	MF	(Senegal) SEN	Krépin Diatta	24	9	17+2	9	0	0	5	0	0	0
9	FW	(Czech Republic) CZE	Michael Krmenčík	12	3	5+4	3	0	0	1+2	0	0	0
16	FW	(Belgium) BEL	Siebe Schrijvers	13	0	3+7	0	0	0	0+3	0	0	0
42	FW	(Nigeria) NGR	Emmanuel Dennis	13	1	6+3	0	0	0	4	1	0	0

=== Goalscorers ===
As of 20 May 2021

Rank	No.	Pos	Nat	Name	Pro League	Belgian Cup	Champions League	Europa League	Total
1	10	FW	(Netherlands)	Noa Lang	16	0	1	0	17
2	20	FW	(Belgium)	Hans Vanaken	11	2	3	0	16
3	11	MF	(Senegal)	Krépin Diatta	10	0	0	0	10
3	29	FW	(Netherlands)	Bas Dost	9	1	0	0	10
5	25	MF	(Netherlands)	Ruud Vormer	5	1	1	0	7
5	27	FW	(Senegal)	Youssouph Badji	4	3	0	0	7
7	90	MF	(Belgium)	Charles De Ketelaere	3	0	2	0	5
8	21	FW	(Nigeria)	David Okereke	4	0	0	0	4
9	9	FW	(Czech Republic)	Michael Krmenčík	3	0	0	0	3
9	44	DF	(Belgium)	Brandon Mechele	2	0	0	1	3
11	2	DF	(Ukraine)	Eduard Sobol	2	0	0	0	2
11	26	MF	(Belgium)	Mats Rits	2	0	0	0	2
11	42	FW	(Nigeria)	Emmanuel Dennis	1	0	1	0	2
14	3	MF	(Colombia)	Éder Álvarez Balanta	1	0	0	0	1
14	5	DF	(Ivory Coast)	Odilon Kossounou	1	0	0	0	1
14	7	MF	(Netherlands)	Tahith Chong	0	1	0	0	1
14	17	DF	(Ivory Coast)	Simon Deli	1	0	0	0	1
14	28	DF	(Belgium)	Ignace Van Der Brempt	1	0	0	0	1
14	30	FW	(Venezuela)	Daniel Pérez	1	0	0	0	1
Own goal					1	1	0	0	2
Totals					80	9	8	1	98
