= 2021 Belgian Super Cup =

Club Brugge	Genk
League winners	Cup winners
3	2
- Date: 17 July 2021
- Venue: Jan Breydel Stadium, Bruges
- Referee: Jonathan Lardot
- Attendance: 10,000

The 2021 Belgian Super Cup was a football match that took place on 17 July 2021 between Club Brugge, the winners of the 2020–21 Belgian First Division A, and Genk, the winners of the 2020–21 Belgian Cup. Genk made its ninth Super Cup appearance after beating Standard Liège in the 2021 Belgian Cup Final on 25 April 2021. For Club Brugge it was its nineteenth Super Cup appearance, and subsequent sixteenth win.

== Match ==
=== Summary ===
Both clubs were missing several key players going into the match, most notably Simon Mignolet, Eduard Sobol, Hans Vanaken and Ruud Vormer for Club Brugge; and Gerardo Arteaga, Carlos Cuesta, Eboue Kouassi, Jhon Lucumí, Daniel Muñoz and Kristian Thorstvedt for Genk. As a result, both managers were forced to experiment.

Despite starting with youngsters Noah Mbamba (16) and Odilon Kossounou (20) in central midfield, Club Brugge started strongly and pinned Genk to its own half, however without creating any chances. It was instead Genk who managed to create some danger first, as Paul Onuachu's diving header, following a cross by Ángelo Preciado, sailed narrowly over the bar. Club Brugge kept controlling the match, but with limited attempts on goal to threaten Genk-goalie Maarten Vandevoordt. Just before halftime, Genk again managed to set up a dangerous attack, with new signing Mike Trésor finding Bryan Heynen whose pass split open the Club Brugge defense to find Théo Bongonda who easily slotted the ball past 19-year old goalkeeper Senne Lammens. Still before half time, Club Brugge managed to equalize as a corner kick was headed in by Matej Mitrović via Vandevoort. Trésor was just late in kicking the ball away as it had already crossed the line.

Club Brugge started the second half in overdrive, knocking out Genk in just a few minutes: Noa Lang was fouled by Preciado in the penalty area and converted the penalty kick himself in absence of Vormer and Vanaken. Immediately thereafter, Clinton Mata extended the lead with a powerful strike which deflected via goalkeeper Vandevoort and the underside of the crossbar into the goal: 3–1. Manager John van den Brom tried to turn the tide using a few substitutions, but could only notice Club Brugge getting stronger and continuing to dominate the match. Mats Rits came close to a fourth for Club Brugge with some 20 minutes to play, but his sneaky freekick hit the outside of the post. Towards the very end of the match, Genk finally was able to create some pressure, with Lammens required to make several strong saves. Eventually, a misunderstanding between Lammens and Mitrović allowed Jere Uronen to score with a blistering strike from about 20 meters, but after that Club Brugge easily held on to win 3–2.

=== Details ===
17 July 2021
20:45

Club Brugge	3–2	Genk
Mitrović 45+3'; Lang 48' (pen.); Mata 50'	Report	Bongonda 44'; Uronen 90+3'

Jan Breydel Stadium, Bruges
Attendance: 10,000
Referee: Jonathan Lardot

Club Brugge	Genk

GK	91	(Belgium) Senne Lammens
RB	77	(Angola) Clinton Mata		(substituted off) 88'
CB	15	(Croatia) Matej Mitrović
CB	44	(Belgium) Brandon Mechele (c)
LB	18	(Uruguay) Federico Ricca
MF	90	(Belgium) Charles De Ketelaere	(yellow card) 66'
MF	72	(Belgium) Noah Mbamba		(substituted off) 77'
MF	26	(Belgium) Mats Rits
MF	5	(Ivory Coast) Odilon Kossounou
CF	10	(Netherlands) Noa Lang	(yellow card) 49'	(substituted off) 85'
MF	29	(Netherlands) Bas Dost		(substituted off) 77'
Substitutes:
MF	3	(Colombia) Éder Álvarez Balanta		(substituted on) 77'
FW	21	(Nigeria) David Okereke
FW	27	(Senegal) Youssouph Mamadou Badji
DF	28	(Belgium) Ignace Van Der Brempt		(substituted on) 88'
FW	30	(Venezuela) Daniel Pérez		(substituted on) 77'
GK	33	(Belgium) Nick Shinton
MF	39	(Belgium) Thomas Van den Keybus
MF	55	(Belgium) Maxim De Cuyper
GK	81	(Belgium) Henri Maton
MF	98	(Belgium) Cisse Sandra		(substituted on) 85'
Manager:
(Belgium) Philippe Clement

GK	26	(Belgium) Maarten Vandevoordt
RB	77	(Ecuador) Ángelo Preciado	(substituted off) 64'
CB	3	(Spain) Mujaid Sadick
CB	2	(United States) Mark McKenzie
LB	6	(Norway) Simen Juklerød
MF	8	(Belgium) Bryan Heynen (c)	(substituted off) 59'
MF	11	(Belgium) Mike Trésor
MF	14	(Switzerland) Bastien Toma
MF	7	(Japan) Junya Ito	(substituted off) 59'
FW	18	(Nigeria) Paul Onuachu	(substituted off) 45'
FW	10	(Belgium) Théo Bongonda	(substituted off) 75'
Substitutes:
FW	9	(Nigeria) Cyriel Dessers	(substituted on) 45'
MF	17	(Slovakia) Patrik Hrošovský	(substituted on) 59'
MF	20	(Netherlands) Carel Eiting	(substituted on) 59'
DF	21	(Finland) Jere Uronen	(substituted on) 64'
MF	24	(Belgium) Luca Oyen
DF	25	(Belgium) Tuur Rommens
MF	28	(Ghana) Joseph Paintsil	(substituted on) 75'
GK	40	(Belgium) Tobe Leysen
Manager:
(Netherlands) John van den Brom

Match rules

- 90 minutes.
- 30 minutes of extra time if necessary.
- Penalty shoot-out if scores still level.
- Maximum of ten named substitutes.
- Maximum of five substitutions.

== See also ==
- 2021–22 Belgian First Division A
- 2021–22 Belgian Cup
