= Noa Lang =

Dutch footballer (born 1999)

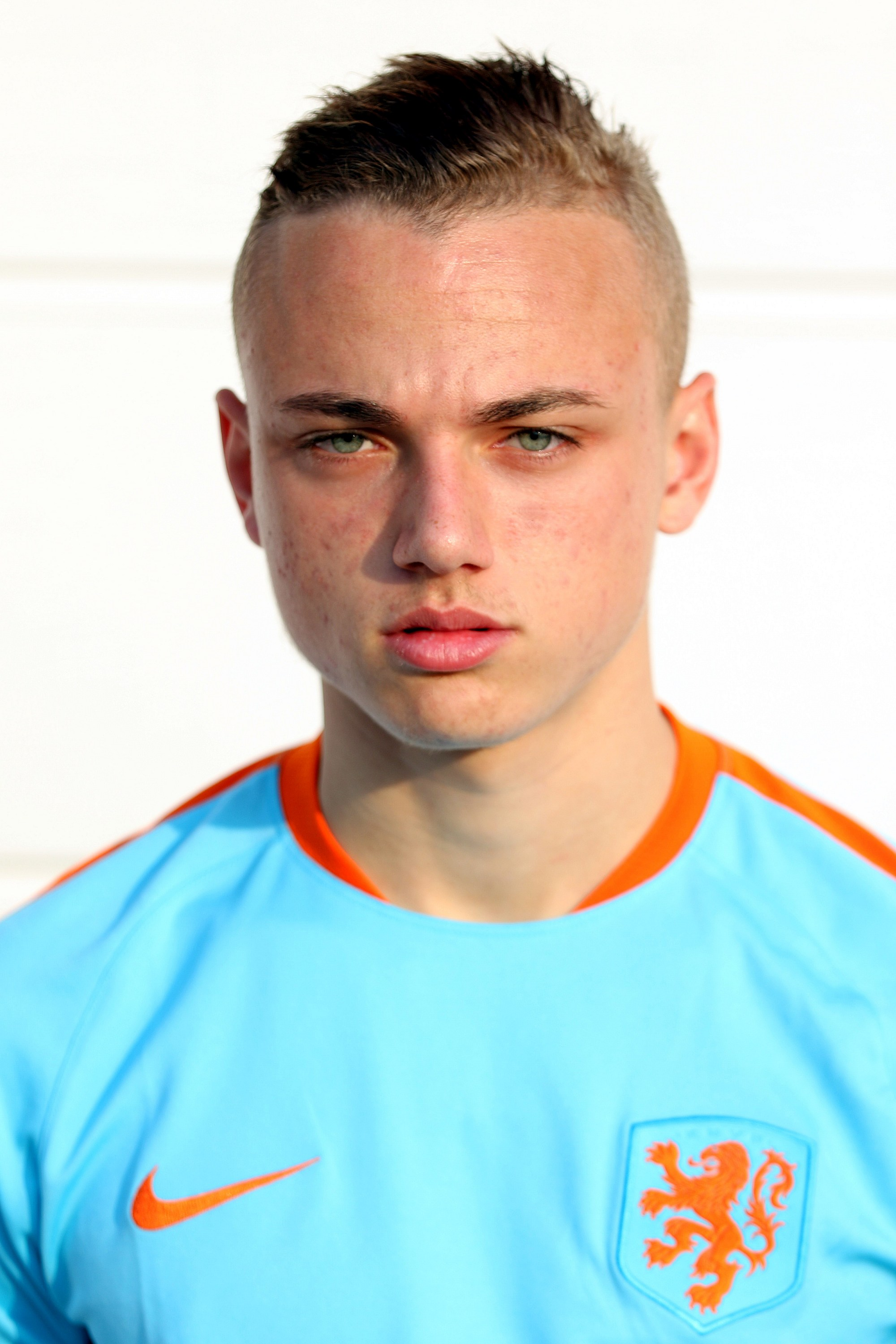
- Lang with Netherlands U18 in 2017

Personal information
- Full name: Noa Noëll Lang
- Date of birth: 17 June 1999 (age 27)
- Place of birth: Capelle aan den IJssel, Netherlands
- Height: 1.70 m (5 ft 7 in)
- Positions: Left winger; left midfielder

Team information
- Current team: Napoli
- Number: 70

Youth career
- 2003–2005: HION
- 2005–2010: Feyenoord
- 2010: Beşiktaş
- 2010–2013: Feyenoord
- 2013–2017: Ajax

Senior career*
Years	Team	Apps	(Gls)
2017–2021	Jong Ajax	47	(12)
2019–2021	Ajax	9	(4)
2019–2020	→ Twente (loan)	7	(1)
2020–2021	→ Club Brugge (loan)	29	(16)
2021–2023	Club Brugge	70	(16)
2023–2025	PSV	40	(15)
2025–	Napoli	28	(2)
2026	→ Galatasaray (loan)	13	(0)

International career^{‡}
2014–2015	Netherlands U16	6	(0)
2017–2018	Netherlands U18	2	(3)
2017–2019	Netherlands U19	6	(3)
2018–2019	Netherlands U20	8	(2)
2019–2021	Netherlands U21	8	(1)
2021–	Netherlands	20	(3)
- * Club domestic league appearances and goals as of 23:49, 21 November 2026 (UTC) ‡ National team caps and goals as of 13 November 2026

Noa Noëll Lang (born 17 June 1999) is a Dutch professional footballer who plays as a left winger for Serie A club Napoli and the Netherlands national team.

== Club career ==
=== Ajax ===
On 1 December 2019, Lang became the first Ajax player to score a hat-trick on his first league start in 60 years as Ajax came from two goals down to beat Twente 5–2. Later that month, Lang scored his first goal in the KNVB Cup for Ajax, netting the opening goal in a 4–3 away win over Telstar in the second round.

In January 2020, following Ajax's signing of Ryan Babel in Lang's position, he was loaned out to fellow Eredivisie side Twente for the remainder of the season.

=== Club Brugge ===
==== 2020–21 season: Loan and league title ====
On 5 October 2020, Ajax and Club Brugge reached a transfer agreement for Lang to move to Brugge on an initial loan with an obligation to make the signing permanent by 1 July 2021. Three weeks later, he scored his first goal for the club from the penalty-spot in a losing effort against OH Leuven. Lang scored in Club Brugge's 3–0 victory over Zenit Saint Petersburg in their penultimate UEFA Champions League group stage match on 2 December to keep alive Club Brugge's hopes of qualifying for the knock-out round. However, Club Brugge could only manage a 2–2 draw in the final match against Italian side Lazio and were parachuted down to the Europa League for the Round of 32.

On 28 January 2021, in his first appearance in a Bruges derby against Cercle, Lang scored the winning goal as Club Brugge came back from 1–0 down to win 1–2.

On 20 May, Lang scored as Brugge drew 3–3 with rivals Anderlecht to win the Belgian First Division A title for the fourth time in six years and 17th time overall. Lang was involved in 28 goal contributions during his first campaign with Club Brugge, scoring 17 goals and adding a further 11 assists.

==== 2021–22 season ====
On 17 July 2021, Lang scored in Club Brugge's 3–2 win over Genk in the Belgian Super Cup. On 15 September, he earned the player of the match award in a 1–1 draw against Paris Saint-Germain (PSG) in the UEFA Champions League.

=== PSV ===
On 8 July 2023, Dutch side PSV announced the signing of Lang on a five-year deal for a club record fee of €15 million. In his first training session, he suffered an injury. At first, the injury looked serious, but shortly after, Noa Lang was spotted training alone. His first game for the Dutch side was the 2023 Johan Cruyff Shield, which he decided by scoring the only goal.

=== Napoli ===
On 17 July 2025, Lang joined Serie A club Napoli on a five-year contract for a reported fee of €25 million. Later that year, on 22 November, he netted his first goal in a 3–1 win over Atalanta.

==== Loan to Galatasaray ====
On 23 January 2026, Lang signed on loan for Galatasaray until the end of the 2025–26 season, with a non-mandatory purchase option.

He made his debut for Galatasaray in a 4–0 Süper Lig win over Kayserispor on 1 February 2026. His first goals for the club came in a 5–2 win over Juventus in the Champions League on 17 February. A month later, on 18 March, he suffered a hand injury involving partial severing of his thumb as a result of a collision with an advertisement board during a Champions League match against Liverpool at Anfield.

== International career ==
Born in the Netherlands, Lang is of Surinamese descent through his biological father. He is a youth international for the Netherlands. Lang considers himself Dutch, Surinamese and Moroccan but can't internationally represent the latter due to not having Moroccan citizenship.

Lang represented the Netherlands at youth level. He appeared at both the 2017 UEFA European Under-19 Championship and the 2021 UEFA European Under-21 Championship.

On 8 October 2021, he made his debut for the Netherlands national team in a World Cup qualifier against Latvia. His first senior international goal came in a UEFA Nations League fixture against Wales on 14 June 2022.

Lang was named in the final Netherlands squad for the 2022 FIFA World Cup. His only appearance of the tournament came in the quarter-final loss to Argentina, where he appeared as an 113th-minute substitute for Cody Gakpo.

In June 2023, he represented the Netherlands at the 2023 UEFA Nations League Finals, scoring an equaliser in the sixth minute of stoppage time in the eventual 4–2 loss to Croatia at the semi-final stage.

Lang was not a member of the Dutch squad for UEFA Euro 2024 due to injury.

On 27 May 2026, Lang was named in the Netherlands' squad for the 2026 FIFA World Cup.

== Personal life ==
Lang was born in the Netherlands. His father is Surinamese, while his mother is Dutch. His stepfather was Moroccan international footballer Nourdin Boukhari. During the spring season of 2025, while officiating a match, his father Jeffrey Lang was physically assaulted although he declined to press charges.

During the 2009–10 football season, Boukhari and Lang resided in Turkey, playing for Kasımpaşa and Beşiktaş junior team respectively.

== Controversy ==
In May 2021, a video circulated online showing Lang joining an antisemitic chant of the Club Brugge supporters aimed at rival Anderlecht, who is seen as historically linked to the Jewish community. He was investigated by the Royal Belgian Football Association. While ignoring calls to apologize, Lang justified his chantings with supporters as "a nickname" claiming that "racism and prejudice are well known to me [...] I didn’t want to offend anyone with that. I’m done with the subject and won’t be revisiting it." Lang, who played with Ajax, before joining Club Brugge, was defended by the team's organisation claiming that "there was no anti-Semitic undertone". The Club Brugge fans have been noticed by the press for racist chants.

The RBFA condemned his behavior, the Belgian Foreign Minister Sophie Wilmès declared: "Unacceptable, unbearable and it has no place in our society. We must fight it as vigorously as all other forms of racism", political parties condemned the chant, while he was obliged by the Federal prosecutor's office to visit the Kazerne Dossin Centre as a disciplinary measure.

== Career statistics ==
=== Club ===
As of match played 21 November 2026

Appearances and goals by club, season and competition
Club	Season	League			National cup (Note: Includes KNVB Cup, Belgian Cup, Coppa Italia, Turkish Cup)		Europe		Other		Total	
Club	Season	Division	Apps	Goals	Apps	Goals	Apps	Goals	Apps	Goals	Apps	Goals
Jong Ajax	2016–17	Eerste Divisie	2	0	—		—		—		2	0
Jong Ajax	2017–18	Eerste Divisie	14	2	—		—		—		14	2
Jong Ajax	2018–19	Eerste Divisie	22	5	—		—		—		22	5
Jong Ajax	2019–20	Eerste Divisie	9	5	—		—		—		9	5
Jong Ajax	Total		47	12	—		—		—		47	12
Ajax	2018–19	Eredivisie	3	0	1	0	0	0	—		4	0
Ajax	2019–20	Eredivisie	5	3	1	1	3 (Note: Appearances in UEFA Champions League)	0	0	0	9	4
Ajax	2020–21	Eredivisie	1	0	—		—		—		1	0
Ajax	Total		9	3	2	1	3	0	0	0	14	4
Twente (loan)	2019–20	Eredivisie	7	1	—		—		—		7	1
Club Brugge (loan)	2020–21	Belgian Pro League	29	16	2	0	6	1	—		37	17
Club Brugge	2021–22	Belgian Pro League	37	7	4	1	6	0	1 (Note: Appearance in Belgian Super Cup)	1	48	9
Club Brugge	2022–23	Belgian Pro League	33	9	2	3	4	0	1	0	40	12
Club Brugge	Club Brugge total		99	32	8	4	16	1	2	1	125	38
PSV	2023–24	Eredivisie	11	4	2	0	5	0	1 (Note: Appearance in Johan Cruyff Shield)	1	19	5
PSV	2024–25	Eredivisie	29	11	4	0	10	2	1	1	44	14
PSV	Total		40	15	6	0	15	2	2	2	63	19
Napoli	2025–26	Serie A	18	1	1	0	6	0	2 (Note: Appearances in Supercoppa Italiana)	0	27	1
Napoli	2026–27	Serie A	10	1	0	0	3	0	—		13	1
Napoli	Total		28	2	1	0	9	0	2	0	40	2
Galatasaray (loan)	2025–26	Süper Lig	13	0	2	0	4	2	—		19	2
Career total			243	65	19	5	47	5	6	3	315	78

=== International ===
As of match played 13 November 2026

Appearances and goals by national team and year
National team	Year	Apps	Goals
Netherlands	2021	3	0
Netherlands	2022	3	1
Netherlands	2023	4	1
Netherlands	2024	2	0
Netherlands	2025	3	1
Netherlands	2026	5	0
Total		20	3

As of match played 10 June 2025
Netherlands score listed first, score column indicates score after each Lang goal.

List of international goals scored by Noa Lang
No.	Date	Venue	Cap	Opponent	Score	Result	Competition
1	14 June 2022	De Kuip, Rotterdam, Netherlands	5	Wales	1–0	3–2	2022–23 UEFA Nations League A
2	14 June 2023	De Kuip, Rotterdam, Netherlands	7	Croatia	2–2	2–4 (a.e.t.)	2023 UEFA Nations League Finals
3	10 June 2025	Euroborg, Groningen, Netherlands	14	Malta	6–0	8–0	2026 FIFA World Cup qualification

== Honours ==
Jong Ajax

- Eerste Divisie: 2017–18

Ajax

- Eredivisie: 2018–19
- KNVB Cup: 2018–19
- Johan Cruyff Shield: 2019

Club Brugge

- Belgian Pro League: 2020–21, 2021–22
- Belgian Super Cup: 2021, 2022

PSV

- Eredivisie: 2023–24, 2024–25
- Johan Cruyff Shield: 2023

Napoli

- Supercoppa Italiana: 2025–26

Galatasaray

- Süper Lig: 2025–26

Individual

- Belgian Young Professional Footballer of the Year: 2020–21
- Eredivisie Team of the Month: December 2024, May 2025,
