= Mats Rits =

Belgian footballer

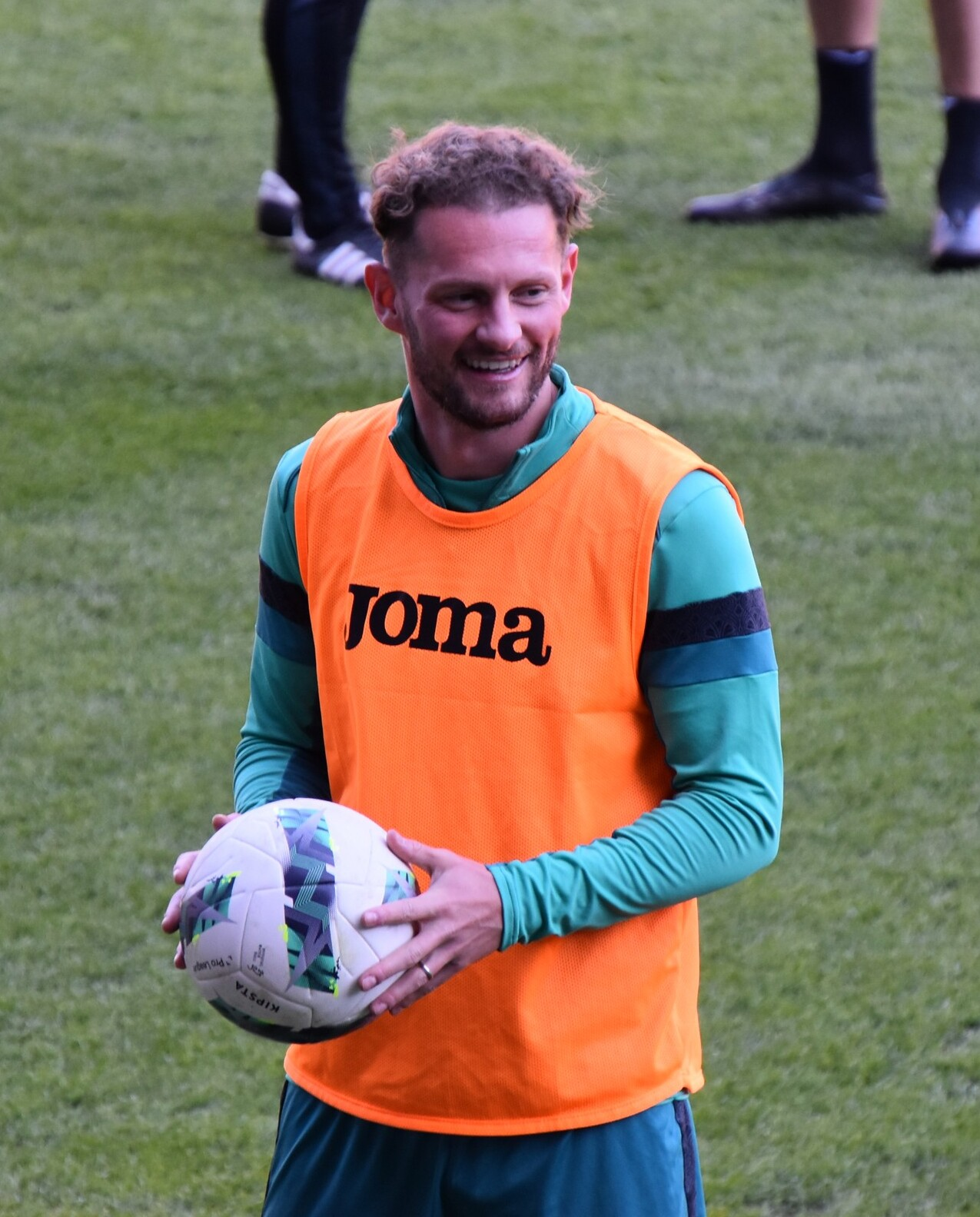
- Rits with Anderlecht in 2025

Personal information
- Date of birth: 18 July 1993 (age 33)
- Place of birth: Antwerp, Belgium
- Height: 1.78 m (5 ft 10 in)
- Position: Central midfielder

Team information
- Current team: Beerschot
- Number: 20

Youth career
- 1999–2001: FC Walem
- 2001–2004: Lierse
- 2004–2009: Germinal Beerschot

Senior career*
Years	Team	Apps	(Gls)
2009–2011	Germinal Beerschot	23	(2)
2011–2013	Ajax	0	(0)
2013–2018	Mechelen	143	(16)
2018–2023	Club Brugge	151	(19)
2023–2026	Anderlecht	67	(1)
2026	RSCA Futures	2	(0)
2026–	Beerschot	1	(0)

International career^{‡}
2008	Belgium U15	7	(3)
2008–2009	Belgium U16	12	(3)
2008–2009	Belgium U17	5	(1)
2011–2012	Belgium U19	6	(2)
- * Club domestic league appearances and goals as of 4 September 2026 ‡ National team caps and goals as of 11:12, 4 October 2018 (UTC)

Mats Rits (born 18 July 1993) is a Belgian professional footballer who plays as a central midfielder for Challenger Pro League club Beerschot.

Rits made his professional debut at age 16 at Germinal Beerschot, where he was formed. He then moved to the famed Ajax academy system before moving back to his native Belgium to play in the Belgian Pro League.

== Career ==
=== Germinal Beerschot ===
Rits made his debut at the highest level of Belgian football in a 3–1 win over VC Westerlo. He came on the pitch in the 30th minute as a replacement for the injured Daniel Cruz. Mats Rits scored the equalizer and the last goal of the match.

During his youth career, several bigger clubs showed interest in the Belgium youth international, who had captained his country at the Under-17 level. RSC Anderlecht, Real Madrid, and Ajax were all clubs that expressed an interest in Rits.

=== Ajax ===
On 28 June 2011, Rits signed a contract with Ajax. He scored his first goal for Ajax in a friendly match against VV Buitenpost on 2 July 2011 in the 75th minute, with the match ending in a 4–0 away win for Ajax. Four days later on 6 July 2011, Rits scored an additional two goals in the 64th and 70th minutes in a friendly fixture against AZSV Aalten. The match ended in a 11–0 away win for the Amsterdam side. Suffering a back injury during practice, Rits was sidelined for the entire 2011–12 season, and for the first half of the 2012–13 season. He appeared in a couple more friendly fixtures for Ajax while recuperating, but was unable to find his way back into the A-Selection. On 9 October 2012, Rits scored the only goal for Ajax in a 1–1 draw at home, in the 76th minute, in a friendly match against Slovakia club AS Trenčín.

=== KV Mechelen ===
Unable to break through into the first team in Amsterdam following his injury, Rits returned to Belgium, signing a 2.5-year contract with KV Mechelen during the Winter transfer window, on 6 January 2013.

=== Club Brugge ===
In the 2018 Summer transfer window, Rits was transferred to Club Brugge.

=== Anderlecht ===
On 15 August 2023, Rits was transferred from Club Brugge to Anderlecht, signing a 3-year contract.

=== Beerschot ===
On 27 August 2026, Rits was announced at K Beerschot VA.

== Career statistics ==
As of match played 24 May 2026

Appearances and goals by club, season and competition
Club	Season	League			National cup (Note: Includes Belgian Cup)		Europe		Other		Total	
Club	Season	Division	Apps	Goals	Apps	Goals	Apps	Goals	Apps	Goals	Apps	Goals
Germinal Beerschot	2009–10	Belgian Pro League	12	2	1	0	—		—		13	2
Germinal Beerschot	2010–11	Belgian Pro League	11	0	1	0	—		—		12	0
Germinal Beerschot	Total		23	2	2	0	—		—		25	2
Ajax	2011–12	Eredivisie	0	0	0	0	0	0	0	0	0	0
Ajax	2012–13	Eredivisie	0	0	0	0	0	0	0	0	0	0
Ajax	Total		0	0	0	0	0	0	0	0	0	0
K.V. Mechelen	2012–13	Belgian Pro League	12	0	0	0	—		—		12	0
K.V. Mechelen	2013–14	Belgian Pro League	25	1	2	0	—		—		27	1
K.V. Mechelen	2014–15	Belgian Pro League	24	2	3	0	—		—		27	2
K.V. Mechelen	2015–16	Belgian Pro League	28	4	3	0	—		—		31	4
K.V. Mechelen	2016–17	Belgian Pro League	37	5	1	0	—		—		38	5
K.V. Mechelen	2017–18	Belgian Pro League	29	4	2	0	—		—		31	4
K.V. Mechelen	Total		155	16	11	0	—		—		166	16
Club Brugge	2018–19	Belgian Pro League	39	3	1	0	7 (Note: Five appearances in UEFA Champions League, two appearances in UEFA Europa League)	0	1 (Note: Appearance in Belgian Super Cup)	0	48	3
Club Brugge	2019–20	Belgian Pro League	20	5	4	1	11 (Note: Nine appearances in UEFA Champions League, two appearances in UEFA Europa League)	0	0	0	35	6
Club Brugge	2020–21	Belgian Pro League	37	2	2	0	5 (Note: Appearances in UEFA Champions League)	0	0	0	44	2
Club Brugge	2021–22	Belgian Pro League	33	7	5	0	6	2	1	0	45	9
Club Brugge	2022–23	Belgian Pro League	20	2	0	0	1	0	0	0	21	2
Club Brugge	2023–24	Belgian Pro League	2	0	0	0	2 (Note: Appearances in UEFA Conference League)	1	0	0	4	1
Club Brugge	Total		151	19	12	1	32	3	2	0	197	23
Anderlecht	2023–24	Belgian Pro League	35	0	2	0	—		—		37	0
Anderlecht	2024–25	Belgian Pro League	29	1	5	0	9 (Note: Appearances in UEFA Europa League)	0	—		43	1
Anderlecht	2025–26	Belgian Pro League	3	0	—		0	0	—		3	0
Anderlecht	Total		67	1	7	0	9	0	—		83	1
RSCA Futures	2025–26	Challenger Pro League	2	0	—		—		—		2	0
Career total			397	38	32	1	41	3	2	0	472	42

== Honours ==
Club Brugge

- Belgian First Division A: 2019–20, 2020–21, 2021–22
- Belgian Super Cup: 2018, 2021
