= Odilon Kossounou =

Ivorian footballer (born 2001)

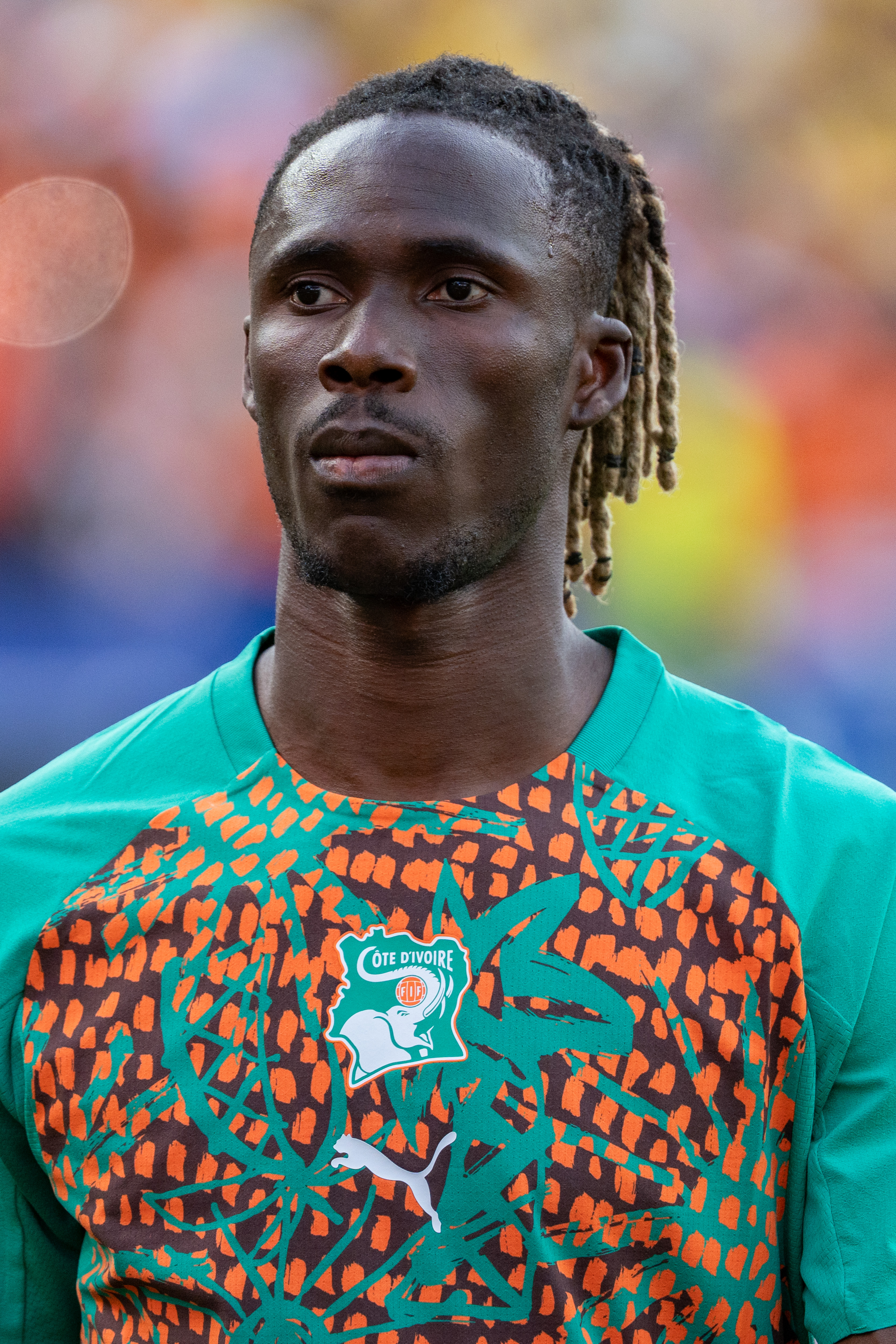
- Kossounou with the Ivory Coast in 2026

Personal information
- Full name: Kouakou Odilon Dorgeless Kossounou
- Date of birth: 4 January 2001 (age 25)
- Place of birth: Abidjan, Ivory Coast
- Height: 1.91 m (6 ft 3 in)
- Position: Centre-back

Team information
- Current team: Atalanta
- Number: 3

Youth career
- –2019: ASEC Mimosas

Senior career*
Years	Team	Apps	(Gls)
2019	Hammarby IF	9	(0)
2019–2021	Club Brugge	40	(1)
2021–2025	Bayer Leverkusen	73	(1)
2024–2025	→ Atalanta (loan)	18	(0)
2025–	Atalanta	19	(1)

International career^{‡}
2020–	Ivory Coast	40	(0)
Medal record
Representing Ivory Coast
Men's football
Africa Cup of Nations
Winner	2023 Ivory Coast
- * Club domestic league appearances and goals as of 23:42, 10 May 2026 (UTC) ‡ National team caps and goals as of 19:10, 30 June 2026 (UTC)

Kouakou Odilon Dorgeless Kossounou ([ɔdilɔ̃ kɔsunu]; born 4 January 2001) is an Ivorian professional footballer who plays as a centre-back for Serie A club Atalanta and the Ivory Coast national team.

== Club career ==
=== Early career ===
Kossounou started his career in the academy of ASEC Mimosas in Abidjan. After having been discovered at the youth tournament Gothia Cup in 2016, he was first invited to train with Swedish Allsvenskan club Hammarby IF. He went on to visit the club on numerous occasions throughout the next few years.

=== Hammarby IF ===
On 11 January 2019, shortly after his 18th birthday, Kossounou signed a four-year contract with Hammarby. He made his competitive debut for the club on 18 February, in the main domestic cup Svenska Cupen, providing an assist to Mats Solhem in a 3–0 win against Varbergs BoIS. Kossounou went on to make nine league appearances in Allsvenskan for the club, most notably being voted man of the match in a 2–2 home draw against IFK Norrköping. On 8 May 2019, Hammarby reached an agreement with Belgian side Club Brugge for the transfer of Kossonou, effective on 1 July the same year. The club received a record-breaking fee for the player, reportedly for a fee of around €4 million (or 44 million SEK) that could rise higher subject to bonuses, plus a 10 percent sell-on clause.

=== Club Brugge ===
On 1 July 2019, Kossounou completed his transfer to Club Brugge. In his first season at the club, Kossounou picked up a league winner's medal as Club Brugge were declared champions in April 2020 with the Pro League being cut short by the COVID-19 pandemic in Belgium.

=== Bayer Leverkusen ===
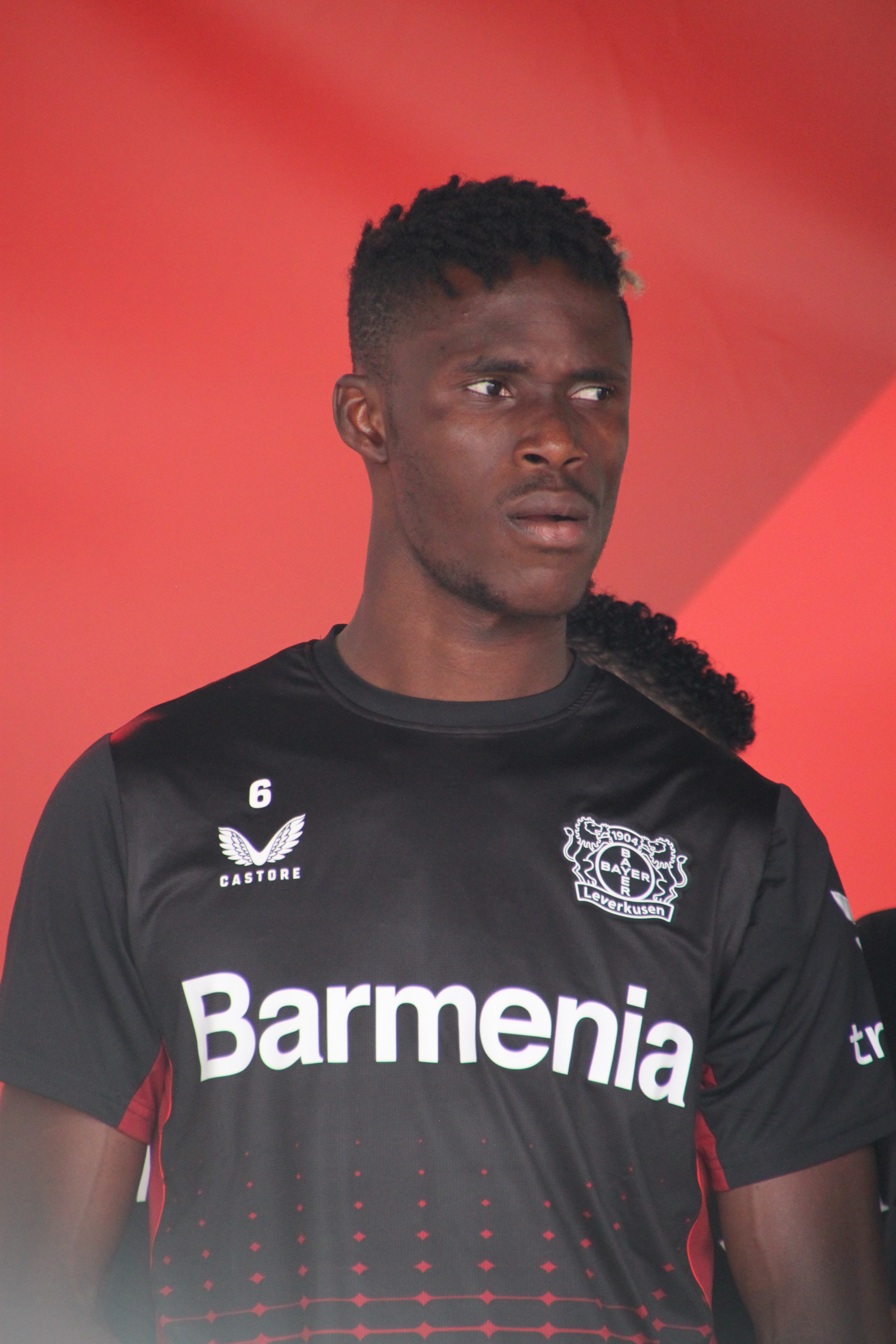
Kossounou with Bayer Leverkusen in 2022

On 22 July 2021, Kossounou joined Bundesliga club Bayer Leverkusen on a five-year deal for a reported €23 million fee.

=== Atalanta ===
On 28 August 2024, Kossounou joined Atalanta in Italy on loan with an option to buy. On 14 June 2025, after his loan ended, Atalanta decided to buy Kossounou, signing a four-year contract with the Italian club.

== International career ==
Kossounou debuted with the Ivory Coast national team in a 1–1 friendly draw with Belgium on 8 October 2020.

Kossounou was a member of the Ivory Coast's squad for the 2021 Africa Cup of Nations and made two appearances, starting once in a 3–1 win over Algeria in the group stage

In December 2023, Kossounou was named in the Ivory Coast's squad for the 2023 Africa Cup of Nations. He went on to start three games, including the final where Ivory Coast won against Nigeria by a score of 2–1.

Kossounou was on the list of Ivorian players selected by the coach Emerse Faé to participate in the 2025 Africa Cup of Nations.

On May 15, 2026, Kossounou was integrated by Ivory Coast coach Emerse Faé in his list of 26 players in order to participate in the 2026 World Cup.

== Playing style ==
Kossounou prevalently plays primarily as centre-back but can also play as a right-back, and excels in his tackling: his long limbs and the excellent timing of his interventions gives him one of the highest tackle success ratios in Europe.

== Outside football ==
In 2020, Kossounou was the subject of a TV-documentary on Swedish television titled "Det vackra spelet" (The beautiful game), that for three years followed him on his transfer to Hammarby and then on to Club Brugge.

== Career statistics ==
=== Club ===
As of match played 10 May 2026

Appearances and goals by club, season and competition
Club	Season	League			National cup (Note: Includes Svenska Cupen, Belgian Cup, DFB-Pokal, Coppa Italia)		Europe		Other		Total	
Club	Season	Division	Apps	Goals	Apps	Goals	Apps	Goals	Apps	Goals	Apps	Goals
Hammarby IF	2019	Allsvenskan	9	0	4	0	—		—		13	0
Club Brugge	2019–20	Belgian Pro League	7	0	1	0	4 (Note: Two appearances in UEFA Champions League, two appearances in UEFA Europa League)	0	—		12	0
Club Brugge	2020–21	Belgian Pro League	33	1	2	0	7 (Note: Five appearances in UEFA Champions League, two appearances in UEFA Europa League)	0	—		42	1
Club Brugge	2021–22	Belgian Pro League	0	0	0	0	0	0	1 (Note: Appearance in Belgian Super Cup)	0	1	0
Club Brugge	Total		40	1	3	0	11	0	1	0	55	1
Bayer Leverkusen	2021–22	Bundesliga	27	0	1	0	5 (Note: Appearances in UEFA Europa League)	0	—		33	0
Bayer Leverkusen	2022–23	Bundesliga	24	0	1	0	10 (Note: Five appearances in UEFA Champions League, five appearances in UEFA Europa League)	0	—		35	0
Bayer Leverkusen	2023–24	Bundesliga	22	1	4	0	8	0	—		34	1
Bayer Leverkusen	Total		73	1	6	0	23	0	—		102	1
Atalanta (loan)	2024–25	Serie A	18	0	0	0	4 (Note: Appearances in UEFA Champions League)	0	1 (Note: Appearance in Supercoppa Italiana)	0	23	0
Atalanta	2025–26	Serie A	19	1	3	0	10	0	—		32	1
Atalanta	Atalanta total		37	1	3	0	14	0	1	0	55	1
Career total			159	3	16	0	48	0	2	0	225	3

=== International ===
As of match played 30 June 2026

Appearances and goals by national team and year
National team	Year	Apps	Goals
Ivory Coast	2020	4	0
Ivory Coast	2021	7	0
Ivory Coast	2022	5	0
Ivory Coast	2023	2	0
Ivory Coast	2024	7	0
Ivory Coast	2025	8	0
Ivory Coast	2026	7	0
Total		40	0

== Honours ==
Club Brugge

- Belgian Pro League: 2019–20, 2020–21
- Belgian Super Cup: 2021

Bayer Leverkusen

- Bundesliga: 2023–24
- DFB-Pokal: 2023–24
- DFL-Supercup: 2024

Ivory Coast

- Africa Cup of Nations: 2023
