= Maxim De Cuyper =

Belgian footballer (born 2000)

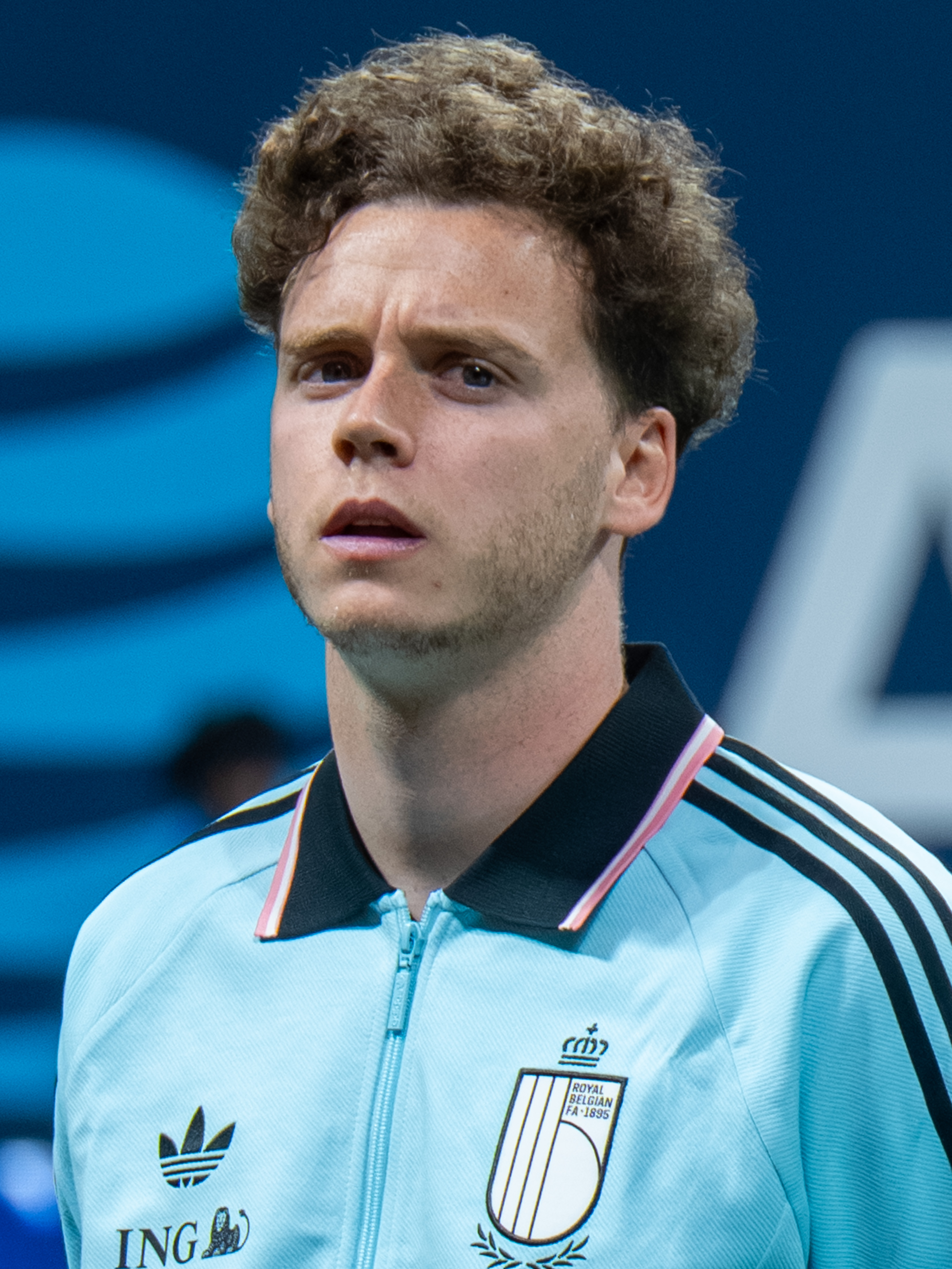
- De Cuyper with Belgium in 2026

Personal information
- Full name: Maxim Peter M. De Cuyper
- Date of birth: 22 December 2000 (age 25)
- Place of birth: Knokke-Heist, Belgium
- Height: 1.82 m (6 ft 0 in)
- Positions: Full-back; left midfielder

Team information
- Current team: Brighton & Hove Albion
- Number: 29

Youth career
- KFC Heist
- Blauw-Zwart
- 2016–2020: Club Brugge

Senior career*
Years	Team	Apps	(Gls)
2020–2025	Club Brugge	74	(6)
2020–2021	Club NXT	20	(5)
2021–2023	→ Westerlo (loan)	64	(15)
2025–	Brighton & Hove Albion	40	(4)

International career^{‡}
2016	Belgium U16	3	(0)
2018	Belgium U19	1	(0)
2022–2023	Belgium U21	8	(1)
2024–	Belgium	30	(5)
- * Club domestic league appearances and goals as of 8 November 2026 ‡ National team caps and goals as of 15 November 2026

Maxim Peter M. De Cuyper (Dutch pronunciation: [ˈmɑksɪm də ˈkœypər]; born 22 December 2000) is a Belgian professional footballer who plays as a full-back or left midfielder for Premier League club Brighton & Hove Albion and the Belgium national team.

== Club career ==
=== Club Brugge ===
De Cuyper began his career at the youth academy of Club Brugge. On 20 February 2020, De Cuyper made his professional debut for Brugge against Manchester United in the first-leg of the UEFA Europa League Round of 32. He started and played 73 minutes as Club Brugge drew 1–1. De Cuyper was then a starter again for Brugge in the second leg of the tie and played the whole match as Brugge fell 0–5. On 30 August 2020, De Cuyper made his debut for Club NXT, Brugge's reserve team, in Belgian First Division B. He came on as a 64th-minute substitute as Brugge were defeated 2–2. On 4 February 2022, Club Brugge announced that they had extended de Cuyper's contract through 2025.

==== Westerlo (loan) ====
On 2 August 2021, he joined Westerlo on loan for the 2021–22 season. The loan was extended for the 2022–23 season.

=== Brighton & Hove Albion ===
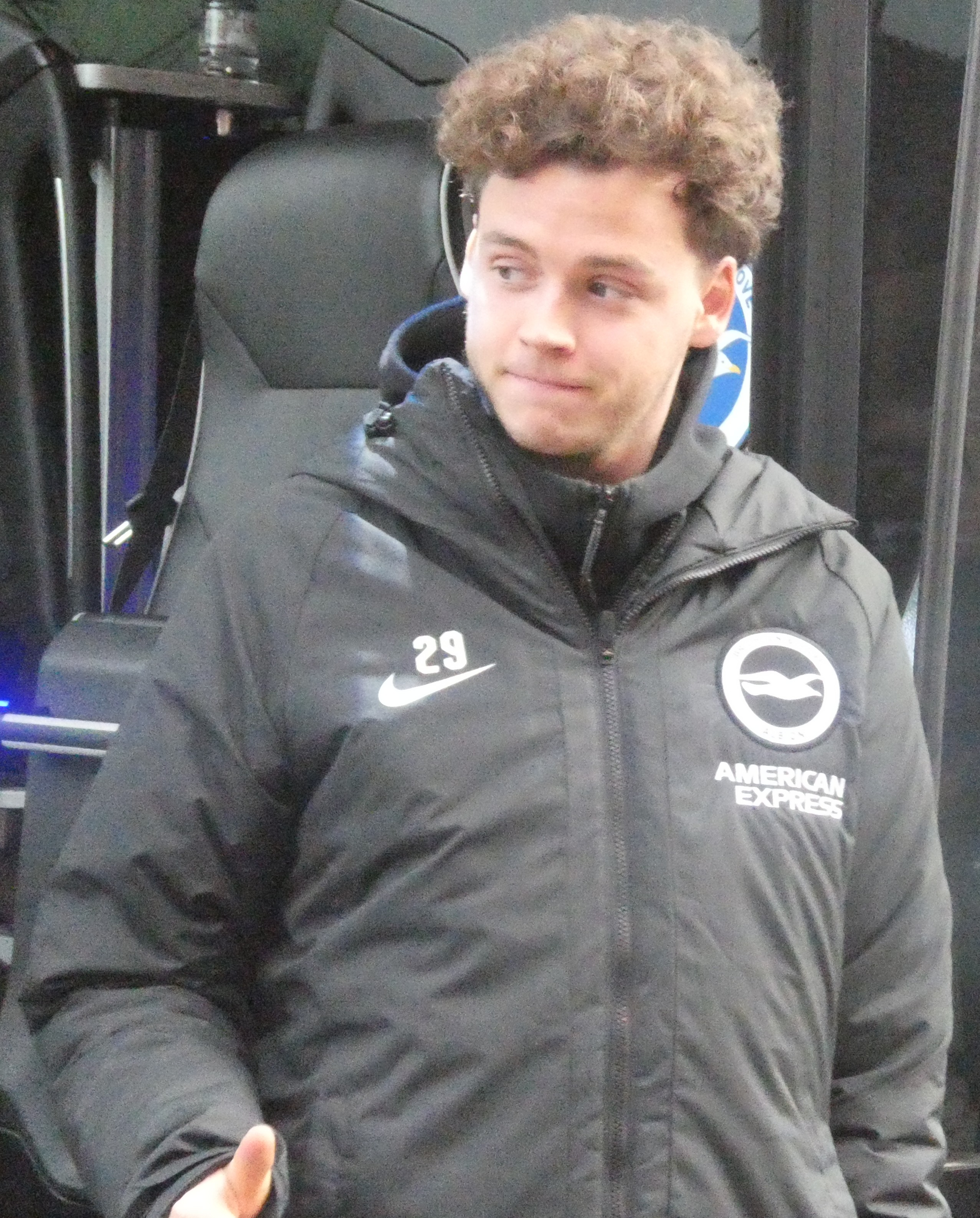
De Cuyper with Brighton & Hove Albion in 2026.

On 5 July 2025, De Cuyper transferred to Premier League club Brighton & Hove Albion for an undisclosed transfer fee, signing a five-year contract. On 16 August, he made his debut for the club in a 1–1 draw against Fulham in the league. His first goal for Brighton was in a comeback against Chelsea FC, as he won a comeback at Stamford Bridge.

== International career ==
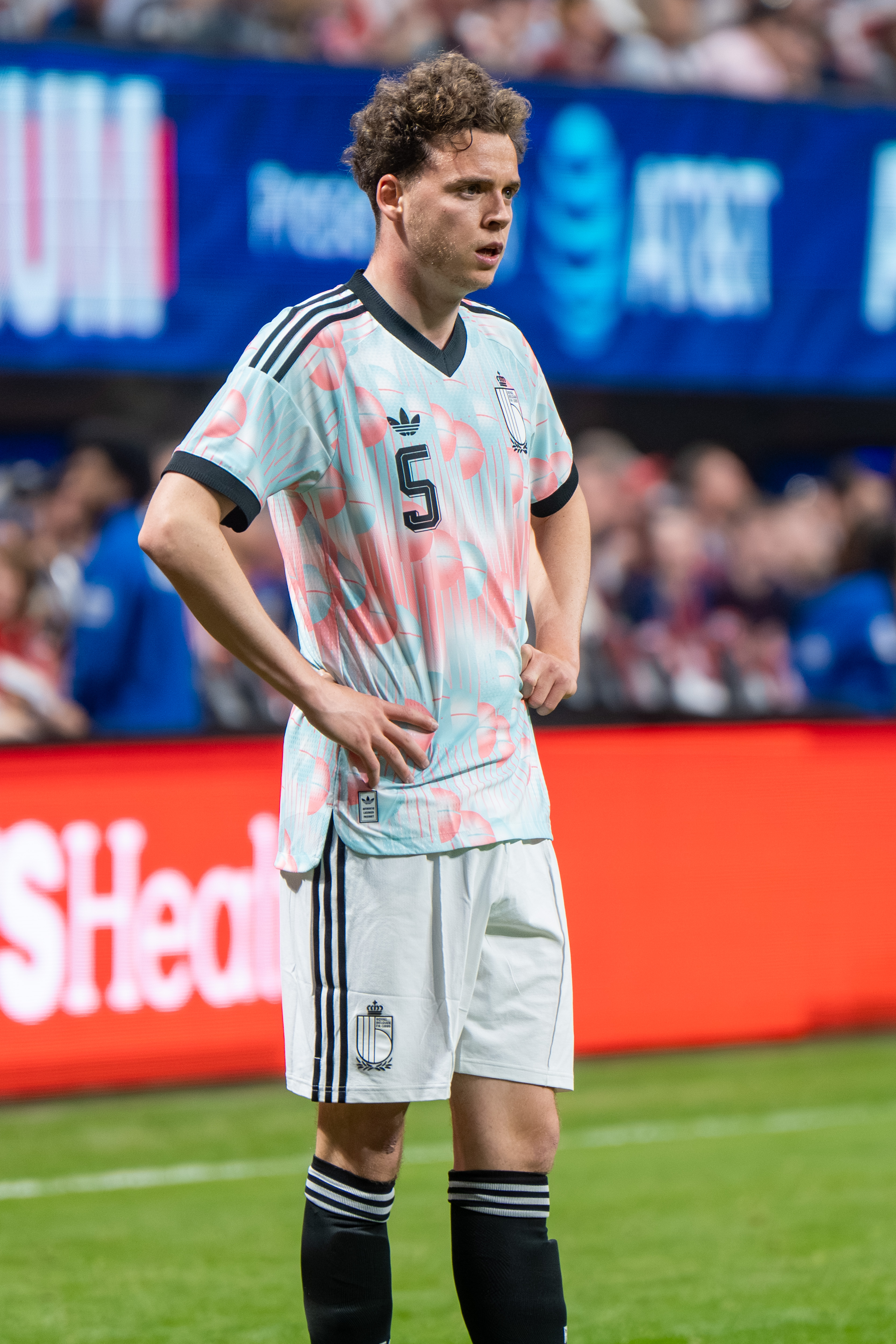
De Cuyper playing with Belgium in 2026

De Cuyper made his debut for the Belgium national team on 5 June 2024 in a friendly against Montenegro. He played the full game in a 2–0 victory at King Baudouin Stadium. De Cuyper was selected for the Belgium National team for the 2024 Euros, but was an unused substitute in all 4 of Belgium's games. De Cuyper scored his first goal for Belgium in a 2–2 draw against Italy on 10 October 2024.

On 15 May 2026, he was named in the 26-man squad for the 2026 FIFA World Cup, where he helped the national team, playing six matches, mostly in rotation.

== Career statistics ==
=== Club ===
As of match played 8 November 2026

Appearances and goals by club, season and competition
Club	Season	League			National cup (Note: Includes Belgian Cup)		League cup (Note: Includes EFL Cup)		Europe		Other		Total	
Club	Season	Division	Apps	Goals	Apps	Goals	Apps	Goals	Apps	Goals	Apps	Goals	Apps	Goals
Club Brugge	2019–20	Belgian Pro League	0	0	0	0	—		2 (Note: Appearances in UEFA Europa League)	0	—		2	0
Club Brugge	2020–21	Belgian Pro League	0	0	1	0	—		2	0	—		3	0
Club Brugge	2023–24	Belgian Pro League	37	3	2	0	—		16 (Note: Appearances in UEFA (Europa) Conference League)	2	—		55	5
Club Brugge	2024–25	Belgian Pro League	37	3	5	0	—		12 (Note: Appearances in UEFA Champions League)	1	0	0	54	4
Club Brugge	Total		74	6	8	0	—		32	3	0	0	114	9
Club NXT	2020–21	Belgian First Division B	20	5	—		—		—		—		20	5
Westerlo (loan)	2021–22	Belgian First Division B	25	6	3	0	—		—		—		28	6
Westerlo (loan)	2022–23	Belgian Pro League	39	9	2	0	—		—		—		41	9
Westerlo (loan)	Total		64	15	5	0	—		—		—		69	15
Brighton & Hove Albion	2025–26	Premier League	30	2	0	0	1	0	—		—		31	2
Brighton & Hove Albion	2026–27	Premier League	10	2	0	0	2	1	4	1	—		16	4
Brighton & Hove Albion	Total		40	4	0	0	3	1	4	1	—		47	6
Career total			198	30	13	0	3	1	36	4	0	0	250	35

=== International ===
As of match played 15 November 2026

Appearances and goals by national team and year
National team	Year	Apps	Goals
Belgium	2024	6	1
Belgium	2025	9	3
Belgium	2026	15	1
Total		30	5

As of match played 15 November 2025
Belgium score listed first, score column indicates score after each De Cuyper goal.

List of international goals scored by Maxim De Cuyper
No.	Date	Venue	Cap	Opponent	Score	Result	Competition	Ref.
1	10 October 2024	Stadio Olimpico, Rome, Italy	3	Italy	1–2	2–2	2024–25 UEFA Nations League A	
2	23 March 2025	Cegeka Arena, Genk, Belgium	8	Ukraine	1–0	3–0	2024–25 UEFA Nations League promotion/relegation play-offs	
3	6 June 2025	Toše Proeski Arena, Skopje, North Macedonia	9	North Macedonia	1–0	1–1	2026 FIFA World Cup qualification	
4	4 September 2025	Rheinpark Stadion, Vaduz, Liechtenstein	11	Liechtenstein	1–0	6–0	2026 FIFA World Cup qualification	
5	15 November 2026	King Baudouin Stadium, Brussels, Belgium	30	Italy	1–1	4–1	2026-27 UEFA Nations League A	

== Honours ==
Club Brugge

- Belgian Pro League: 2023–24
- Belgian Cup: 2024–25
- Belgian Super Cup: 2021

Westerlo

- Belgian First Division B: 2021–22
