= Clinton Mata =

Belgian-Angolan footballer (born 1992)

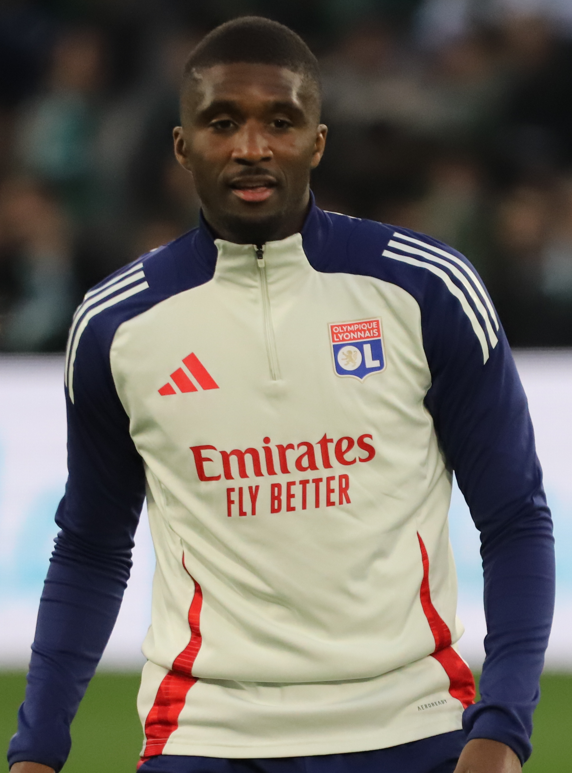
- Mata with Lyon in 2025

Personal information
- Full name: Clinton Mukoni Mata Pedro Lourenço
- Date of birth: 7 November 1992 (age 34)
- Place of birth: Verviers, Belgium
- Height: 1.80 m (5 ft 11 in)
- Position: Right-back

Team information
- Current team: Lyon
- Number: 22

Youth career
- 2000–2003: Royal Battice
- 2003–2004: Entente Rechaintoise
- 2004: Royal Battice
- 2004–2008: Etoile Elsautoise
- 2008–2010: Visé
- 2010–2011: Eupen

Senior career*
Years	Team	Apps	(Gls)
2011–2014	Eupen	62	(2)
2014–2018	Charleroi	82	(1)
2017–2018	→ Genk (loan)	25	(0)
2018–2023	Club Brugge	151	(5)
2023–	Lyon	91	(0)

International career^{‡}
2014–	Angola	18	(0)
- * Club domestic league appearances and goals as of 18 October 2026 ‡ National team caps and goals as of 26 December 2025

Clinton Mukoni Mata Pedro Lourenço (born 7 November 1992) is a professional footballer who plays as a right-back for Ligue 1 club Lyon. Born in Belgium, he played for the Angola national team.

== Club career ==
=== Early years ===
Born in Verviers, Belgium, Mata started playing football with local clubs Royal Battice, Entente Rechaintoise, Etoile Elsautoise and Visé before moving to Eupen in 2010. On 17 February 2012, he made his professional debut in a 2–1 win over Waasland-Beveren in the Belgian Second Division. Afterwards, Mata was not always in the starting eleven, first winning a regular place in the starting lineup in the second half of the 2013–14 season, where Eupen qualified as runner-up for the final round for promotion to the first Belgian league. This ended in a disappointing 2–1 defeat to OH Leuven.

=== Charleroi ===
In the summer of 2014, Mata moved to Belgian Pro League club Charleroi, where he was mainly a substitute as before in Eupen, before coming closer to a regular starting spot in the second half of the 2015–16 season. As group winners in play-off 2, Charleroi qualified for the play-off for participation in the final for qualifying for the UEFA Europa League. In the playoff match, Mata and his club beat Kortrijk, but lost in the final Europa League play-off match against Genk. The following season marked the breakthrough of Mata for Charleroi, and in August 2017 he moved to Genk on loan. Mata was part of the team qualifying for the UEFA Europa League after Zulte Waregem were beaten 2–0 in the decisive play-off game.

=== Club Brugge ===
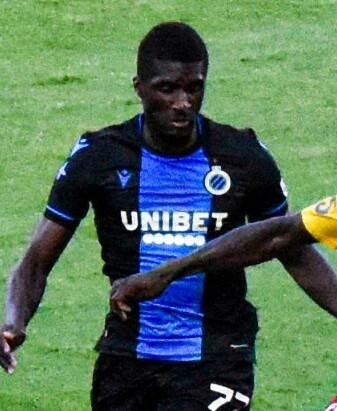
Mata playing for Club Brugge in 2020.

Mata then joined the defending Belgian champions, Club Brugge, but only made his debut on the ninth matchday in the derby against Cercle Brugge due to an injury. Mata evolved into a starter for the club during his first season, where they finished runner-up in the league. He was also utilised in Club Brugge's UEFA Champions League campaign. In the following season, Mata had experienced his breakthrough when he played almost every game and won the Belgian championship with Club Brugge after the COVID-19 pandemic had resulted in the season being abandoned.

=== Lyon ===
On 6 July 2023, Mata signed for Ligue 1 club Lyon on a three-year contract. The transfer fee was a reported €5 million.

== International career ==
In July 2014 Mata was asked to switch his international allegiance to Angola. He made his debut for the Angola national team later that year, earning 8 caps over two years.

Belgium national team manager Roberto Martínez said he had been particularly impressed by Mata, and had regretted learning of his choice for Angola; Mata stated that he had no regrets playing for Angola.

In June 2024, Mata returned to the Angolan national team.

On 3 December 2025, Mata was called up to the Angola squad for the 2025 Africa Cup of Nations.

== Career statistics ==
=== Club ===
As of match played 18 October 2026

Appearances and goals by club, season and competition
Club	Season	League			National cup (Note: Includes Belgian Cup, Coupe de France)		Continental		Other		Total	
Club	Season	Division	Apps	Goals	Apps	Goals	Apps	Goals	Apps	Goals	Apps	Goals
Eupen	2010–11	Belgian Second Division	11	0	–		–		–		11	0
Eupen	2011–12	Belgian Second Division	0	0	–		–		2	0	2	0
Eupen	2012–13	Belgian Second Division	26	0	–		–		–		36	1
Eupen	2013–14	Belgian Second Division	26	2	1	0	–		6	0	33	2
Eupen	Total		62	2	1	0	–		8	0	71	2
Charleroi	2014–15	Belgian Pro League	19	0	2	0	–		–		21	0
Charleroi	2014–15	Belgian Pro League	26	0	1	0	0	0	–		27	0
Charleroi	2016–17	Belgian Pro League	36	1	2	0	–		–		38	1
Charleroi	2017–18	Belgian Pro League	1	0	0	0	–		–		1	0
Charleroi	Total		82	1	5	0	0	0	–		87	1
Genk (loan)	2017–18	Belgian Pro League	25	0	4	0	—		0	0	29	0
Club Brugge	2018–19	Belgian Pro League	24	2	0	0	4 (Note: Appearances in UEFA Champions League)	0	0	0	28	2
Club Brugge	2019–20	Belgian Pro League	25	0	5	0	10 (Note: Eight appearances in UEFA Champions League, two appearances in UEFA Europa League)	0	0	0	40	0
Club Brugge	2020–21	Belgian Pro League	39	1	2	0	8 (Note: Six appearances in UEFA Champions League, two appearances in UEFA Europa League)	0	0	0	49	1
Club Brugge	2021–22	Belgian Pro League	38	1	5	0	6	0	1 (Note: Appearance in Belgian Super Cup)	0	50	1
Club Brugge	2022–23	Belgian Pro League	25	1	1	0	3	0	1	0	30	1
Club Brugge	Total		151	5	13	0	31	0	2	0	197	5
Lyon	2023–24	Ligue 1	28	0	5	0	–		–		33	0
Lyon	2024–25	Ligue 1	29	0	1	0	9 (Note: Appearances in UEFA Europa League)	0	–		39	0
Lyon	2025–26	Ligue 1	32	0	3	0	9	0	—		44	0
Lyon	2026–27	Ligue 1	2	0	0	0	4 (Note: Three appearances in UEFA Champions League, one appearance in UEFA Europa League)	0	—		6	0
Lyon	Total		91	0	10	0	22	0	–		122	0
Career total			411	8	33	0	53	0	10	0	507	8

=== International ===
As of match played 26 December 2025

Appearances and goals by national team and year
National team	Year	Apps	Goals
Angola	2014	3	0
Angola	2015	3	0
Angola	2016	2	0
Angola	2024	4	0
Angola	2025	6	0
Total		18	0

== Honours ==
Club Brugge

- Belgian Pro League: 2019–20, 2020–21
- Belgian Super Cup: 2018, 2021, 2022

Lyon

- Coupe de France runner-up: 2023–24
