= Daniel Pérez (footballer, born 2002) =

Venezuelan footballer

Personal information
- Full name: Daniel Alejandro Pérez Córdova
- Date of birth: 17 January 2002 (age 24)
- Place of birth: Caracas, Venezuela
- Height: 1.89 m (6 ft 2 in)
- Position: Forward

Team information
- Current team: Vllaznia Shkodër

Senior career*
| Years | Team | Apps | (Gls) |
| 2018–2020 | Metropolitanos | 26 | (8) |
| 2021–2022 | Club Brugge | 14 | (1) |
| 2021–2025 | Club NXT | 31 | (3) |
| 2023–2024 | → Oostende (loan) | 31 | (5) |
| 2025 | → Lokeren-Temse (loan) | 11 | (3) |
| 2025–2026 | Nea Salamina | 15 | (6) |
| 2026– | Vllaznia Shkodër | 1 | (0) |

International career^{‡}
| 2019 | Venezuela U17 | 3 | (0) |
| 2022 | Venezuela U21 | 5 | (2) |
| 2023 | Venezuela U23 | 4 | (0) |
- * Club domestic league appearances and goals as of 3 May 2026 ‡ National team caps and goals as of 15 June 2023

Daniel Alejandro Pérez Córdova (born 17 January 2002) is a Venezuelan professional footballer who plays as a forward for Vllaznia Shkodër.

== Career statistics ==
=== Club ===
As of 2 May 2021

Appearances and goals by club, season and competition
| Club | Season | League | | | National cup | | Continental | | Other | | Total | |
| Club | Season | Division | Apps | Goals | Apps | Goals | Apps | Goals | Apps | Goals | Apps | Goals |
|---|---|---|---|---|---|---|---|---|---|---|---|---|
| Metropolitanos | 2018 | Venezuelan Primera División | 4 | 0 | 0 | 0 | – | | – | | 4 | 0 |
| Metropolitanos | 2019 | Venezuelan Primera División | 11 | 1 | 3 | 0 | – | | – | | 14 | 1 |
| Metropolitanos | 2020 | Venezuelan Primera División | 11 | 7 | – | | – | | – | | 11 | 7 |
| Metropolitanos | Total | | 22 | 8 | 3 | 0 | 0 | 0 | 0 | 0 | 25 | 8 |
| Club NXT | 2020–21 | Belgian First Division B | 1 | 1 | – | | – | | – | | 1 | 1 |
| Club Brugge | 2020–21 | Belgian First Division A | 7 | 1 | 1 | 0 | – | | – | | 8 | 1 |
| Career total | | | 34 | 10 | 4 | 0 | 0 | 0 | 0 | 0 | 38 | 10 |

== Honours ==
Club Brugge

- Belgian First Division A: 2020–21
- Belgian Super Cup: 2021
