= Eduard Sobol =

Ukrainian footballer

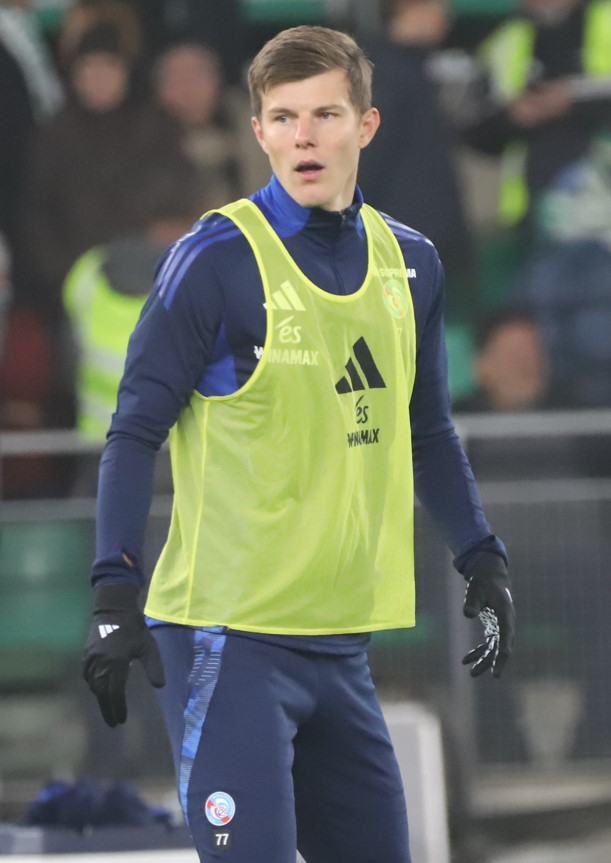
- Sobol in 2024

Personal information
- Full name: Eduard Oleksandrovych Sobol
- Date of birth: 20 April 1995 (age 31)
- Place of birth: Vilniansk, Ukraine
- Height: 1.86 m (6 ft 1 in)
- Position: Left-back

Team information
- Current team: Jablonec
- Number: 23

Youth career
- 2008–2011: Metalurh Zaporizhzhia

Senior career*
Years	Team	Apps	(Gls)
2011	Metalurh-2 Zaporizhzhia	3	(1)
2011–2013	Metalurh Zaporizhzhia	23	(2)
2013–2021	Shakhtar Donetsk	14	(0)
2014–2015	→ Metalurh Donetsk (loan)	15	(0)
2015–2016	→ Metalist Kharkiv (loan)	21	(0)
2016–2017	→ Zorya Luhansk (loan)	21	(1)
2017–2018	→ Slavia Prague (loan)	20	(1)
2018–2019	→ Jablonec (loan)	21	(1)
2019–2021	→ Club Brugge (loan)	56	(2)
2021–2023	Club Brugge	37	(2)
2023–2026	Strasbourg	28	(0)
2024	→ Genk (loan)	13	(0)
2026–	Jablonec	12	(1)

International career^{‡}
2010–2011	Ukraine U16	11	(0)
2010–2012	Ukraine U17	5	(0)
2012–2013	Ukraine U18	7	(1)
2012–2014	Ukraine U19	15	(0)
2012	Ukraine U21	1	(0)
2016–	Ukraine	29	(0)
- * Club domestic league appearances and goals as of 27 May 2026 ‡ National team caps and goals as of 16 June 2023

Eduard Oleksandrovych Sobol (Ukrainian: Едуард Олекса́ндрович Со́боль; born 20 April 1995) is a Ukrainian professional footballer who plays as a left-back for Czech club Jablonec, and the Ukraine national team.

== Club career ==
Sobol was born in Vilniansk, Zaporizhzhia Oblast, Ukraine, in a family of the professional footballer Oleksandr Sobol. He is a product of Metalurh Zaporizhzhia's youth system. Sobol made his debut for FC Metalurhon on 5 November 2011, against FC Enerhetyk Burshtyn in the Ukrainian First League.

In February 2013, Sobol signed a three-year contract with Shakhtar Donetsk.

On 9 May 2018, he played as Slavia Prague won the 2017–18 Czech Cup final against FK Jablonec.

On 4 July 2019, Sobol joined Club Brugge on loan. On 24 October 2022, Sobol signed a three year contract extension with the club. He left Club Brugge after playing over 120 matches for the club.

In January 2023, Sobol joined Ligue 1 club Strasbourg on a three-and-a-half-year deal.

On 23 January 2024, Sobol returned to Belgium and joined Genk on loan with an option to buy.

On 15 January 2026, Sobol returned to the Czech Republic and signed a contract with FK Jablonec until 30 June 2027.

== International career ==
Sobol was named in the 31-player Ukraine national team squad for the 2018 FIFA World Cup qualification match against Iceland on 5 September 2016.

On 17 November 2020, he tested positive for COVID-19 whilst on international duty with Ukraine.

On 1 June 2021, Sobol was called up to the Ukraine squad for the delayed UEFA Euro 2020.

== Career statistics ==
=== Club ===
As of 12 April 2025

Appearances and goals by club, season and competition
Club	Season	League			National cup		Continental		Other		Total	
Club	Season	Division	Apps	Goals	Apps	Goals	Apps	Goals	Apps	Goals	Apps	Goals
Metalurh-2 Zaporizhzhia	2011–12	Ukrainian Second League	3	1	—		—		—		3	1
Metalurh Zaporizhzhia	2011–12	Ukrainian First League	14	2	0	0	—		—		14	2
Metalurh Zaporizhzhia	2012–13	Ukrainian Premier League	9	0	0	0	—		—		9	0
Metalurh Zaporizhzhia	Total		23	2	0	0	—		—		23	2
Shakhtar Donetsk	2012–13	Ukrainian Premier League	5	0	1	0	0	0	0	0	6	0
Shakhtar Donetsk	2013–14	Ukrainian Premier League	9	0	1	0	0	0	0	0	10	0
Shakhtar Donetsk	Total		14	0	2	0	0	0	0	0	16	0
Metalurh Donetsk (loan)	2014–15	Ukrainian Premier League	15	0	0	0	—		—		15	0
Metalist Kharkiv (loan)	2015–16	Ukrainian Premier League	21	0	0	0	—		—		21	0
Zorya Luhansk (loan)	2016–17	Ukrainian Premier League	21	1	1	0	5 (Note: Appearances in UEFA Europa League)	0	—		27	1
Slavia Prague (loan)	2017–18	Czech First League	20	1	2	0	6	0	—		28	1
Jablonec (loan)	2018–19	Czech First League	21	1	2	0	4	0	—		27	1
Club Brugge (loan)	2019–20	Belgian First Division A	26	0	5	0	6 (Note: Appearances in UEFA Champions League)	0	—		37	0
Club Brugge (loan)	2020–21	Belgian First Division A	30	2	1	0	6 (Note: Five appearances in UEFA Champions League, one appearance in UEFA Europa League)	0	—		31	2
Club Brugge (loan)	Total		56	2	6	0	12	0	—		74	2
Club Brugge	2021–22	Belgian First Division A	28	1	4	0	4	0	0	0	36	1
Club Brugge	2022–23	Belgian Pro League	9	1	1	0	4	0	0	0	14	1
Club Brugge	Total		37	2	5	0	8	0	0	0	50	2
Strasbourg	2022–23	Ligue 1	15	0	0	0	—		—		15	0
Strasbourg	2023–24	Ligue 1	3	0	1	0	—		—		4	0
Strasbourg	2024–25	Ligue 1	10	0	2	0	—		—		12	0
Strasbourg	Total		28	0	3	0	—		—		31	0
Genk (loan)	2023–24	Belgian Pro League	13	0	—		—		—		13	0
Career total			270	9	21	0	35	0	0	0	326	10

=== International ===
As of 16 November 2021

Appearances and goals by national team and year
National team	Year	Apps	Goals
Ukraine	2016	4	0
Ukraine	2017	3	0
Ukraine	2018	3	0
Ukraine	2019	4	0
Ukraine	2020	4	0
Ukraine	2021	9	0
Total		27	0

== Honours ==
Shakhtar Donetsk

- Ukrainian Premier League: 2012–13, 2013–14
- Ukrainian Cup: 2012–13
- Ukrainian Super Cup: 2012, 2013, 2014

Slavia Prague

- Czech Cup: 2017–18

Club Brugge

- Belgian First Division A: 2019–20, 2020–21, 2021–22
- Belgian Super Cup: 2021

Individual

- Golden talent of Ukraine: 2013 (U-19)
