= Noah Mbamba =

Belgian footballer

Personal information
- Full name: Noah Mbamba-Muanda
- Date of birth: 5 January 2005 (age 21)
- Place of birth: Ixelles, Belgium
- Height: 1.87 m (6 ft 2 in)
- Positions: Defensive midfielder; centre-back

Team information
- Current team: Lorient (on loan from Bayer Leverkusen)
- Number: 72

Youth career
- 2019–2020: Genk
- 2020–2021: Club Brugge

Senior career*
Years	Team	Apps	(Gls)
2020–2021	Club NXT	20	(3)
2021–2023	Club Brugge	16	(0)
2023–	Bayer Leverkusen	4	(0)
2024–2025	→ Fortuna Düsseldorf (loan)	6	(0)
2024–2025	→ Fortuna Düsseldorf II (loan)	2	(1)
2025–2026	→ Dender (loan)	42	(2)
2026–	→ Lorient (loan)	0	(0)

International career^{‡}
2020	Belgium U15	2	(0)
2021–2023	Belgium U19	12	(0)
2024	Belgium U21	1	(0)
2026–	DR Congo	1	(0)
- * Club domestic league appearances and goals as of 11 May 2026 ‡ National team caps and goals as of 15:11, 25 May 2024 (UTC)

Noah Mbamba-Muanda (born 5 January 2005) is a professional footballer who plays as a defensive midfielder and centre-back for Ligue 1 club Lorient, on loan from Bundesliga club Bayer Leverkusen. Born in Belgium, he represents the DR Congo national team.

== Club career ==
=== Club Brugge ===
On 22 January 2021, Mbamba made his debut for Club Brugge's reserve side, Club NXT in the Belgian First Division B against Lierse. He made his league debut for the senior squad of Brugge in the Belgian First Division A on 23 May 2021, when he started in the game against Genk, at the age of 16. He made his Champions league debut on 3 November 2021 against Manchester City at the age of 16.

=== Bayer Leverkusen ===
On 14 January 2023, Mbamba joined German club Bayer Leverkusen for an undisclosed fee, signing a contract until June 2028.

==== Loan to Düsseldorf ====
On 19 June 2024, Mbamba joined Fortuna Düsseldorf on loan for the 2024–25 season.

==== Loan to Dender ====
On 4 February 2025, he returned to Belgium on a new loan to Dender. On 9 April 2025, the loan to Dender was extended for the 2025–26 season.

== International career ==
Born in Belgium, Mbamba is of Congolese descent. He is a youth international for Belgium.

Mbamba was one of the players who were called up with the DR Congo national team by head coach Sébastien Desabre for the 2027 Africa Cup of Nations qualification matches against Equatorial Guinea (24 September 2026), Zimbabwe (28 September) and the 2 friendlies against Uganda (2 and 5 October).

He made his debut on 12 November 2026 in an AFCON qualifier against Sierra Leone.

== Career statistics ==
=== Club ===
As of match played 3 February 2024

Appearances and goals by club, season and competition
Club	Season	League			National cup (Note: Includes Belgian Cup, DFB-Pokal)		Continental		Other		Total	
Club	Season	Division	Apps	Goals	Apps	Goals	Apps	Goals	Apps	Goals	Apps	Goals
Club NXT	2020–21	Belgian First Division B	11	0	—		—		—		11	0
Club NXT	2022–23	Belgian First Division B	9	3	—		—		—		9	3
Club NXT	Total		20	3	—		—		—		20	3
Club Brugge	2020–21	Belgian Pro League	0	0	0	0	0	0	2 (Note: Appearances in Belgian Pro League playoff)	0	2	0
Club Brugge	2021–22	Belgian Pro League	14	0	3	0	3 (Note: Appearances in UEFA Champions League)	0	1 (Note: Appearance in Belgian Super Cup)	0	21	0
Club Brugge	2022–23	Belgian Pro League	2	0	1	0	0	0	1	0	4	0
Club Brugge	Total		16	0	4	0	3	0	4	0	27	0
Bayer Leverkusen	2022–23	Bundesliga	1	0	—		—		—		1	0
Bayer Leverkusen	2023–24	Bundesliga	3	0	1	0	2 (Note: Appearances in UEFA Europa League)	0	—		6	0
Bayer Leverkusen	Total		4	0	1	0	2	1	—		7	0
Career total			40	3	5	0	5	0	4	0	54	3

== Honours ==
Club Brugge

- Belgian Super Cup: 2021

Bayer Leverkusen

- Bundesliga: 2023–24
