= Charles De Ketelaere =

Belgian footballer (born 2001)

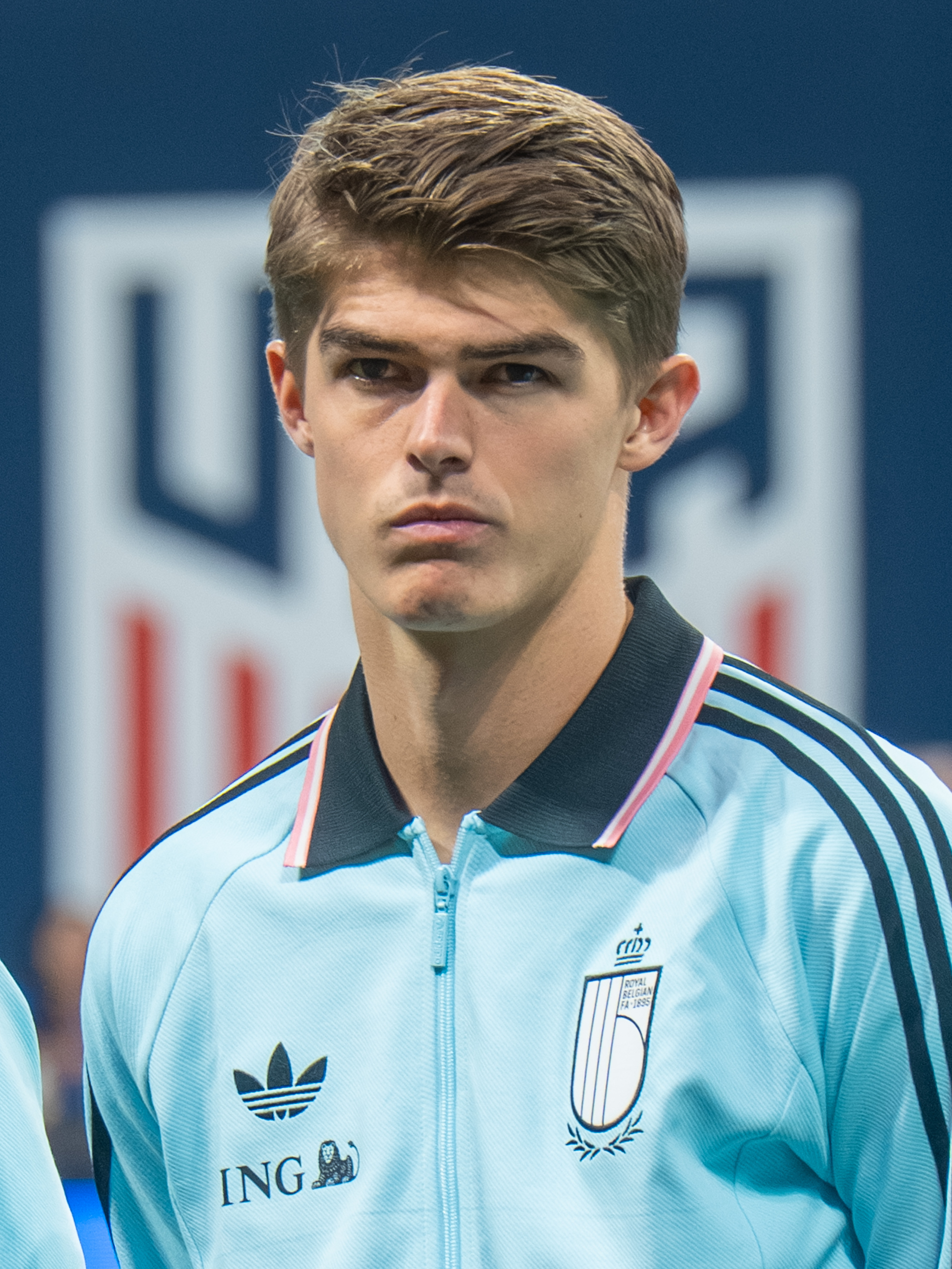
- De Ketelaere with Belgium in 2026

Personal information
- Full name: Charles Marc S. De Ketelaere
- Date of birth: 10 March 2001 (age 25)
- Place of birth: Bruges, Belgium
- Height: 1.93 m (6 ft 4 in)
- Positions: Attacking midfielder; forward

Team information
- Current team: Atalanta
- Number: 17

Youth career
- 2008–2019: Club Brugge

Senior career*
Years	Team	Apps	(Gls)
2019–2022	Club Brugge	90	(19)
2022–2024	AC Milan	32	(0)
2023–2024	→ Atalanta (loan)	35	(10)
2024–	Atalanta	79	(13)

International career^{‡}
2017	Belgium U16	4	(1)
2018	Belgium U17	1	(0)
2019	Belgium U19	6	(3)
2020–2023	Belgium U21	10	(1)
2020–	Belgium	41	(9)
- * Club domestic league appearances and goals as of 23:07, 22 November 2026 (UTC) ‡ National team caps and goals as of 15 November 2026 (UTC)

Charles Marc S. De Ketelaere (Dutch pronunciation: [ˈʃɑrlə də ˈkeːtəˌlaːrə]; born 10 March 2001) is a Belgian professional footballer who plays as an attacking midfielder or forward for Serie A club Atalanta and the Belgium national team.

== Club career ==
=== Club Brugge ===
De Ketelaere joined Club Brugge at the age of seven, also working as a ball boy. He also played tennis as a youth, but chose to pursue football.

He made his senior debut on 25 September 2019, when he played the full game in the 2019–20 Belgian Cup matchup against Francs Borains.

On 22 October 2019, he made his UEFA Champions League debut against Paris Saint-Germain. He started the game and was substituted in the 57th minute with the score of 1–0 to Paris Saint-Germain, the game eventually ended with a 5–0 loss. On 5 February 2020, he scored a goal in a 2–1 win against Zulte Waregem to reach the Belgian Cup final.

On 20 October 2020, De Ketelaere scored the game-winning goal in the 93rd minute to defeat Zenit St. Petersburg 2–1 in the group stage of the 2020–21 UEFA Champions League.

=== AC Milan ===
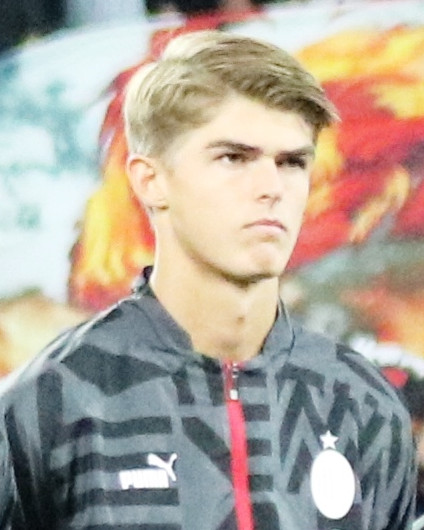
De Ketelaere with AC Milan in 2022

On 2 August 2022, De Ketelaere joined Serie A club AC Milan on a contract until 30 June 2027. Signed for a fee reported to be in the range of €35 million, De Ketelaere however failed to fulfill the initial expectations of the Rossoneri, scoring no goals throughout the entire season and making only nine league starts.

=== Atalanta ===
On 16 August 2023, Atalanta formally confirmed the signing of De Ketelaere from AC Milan on a loan move with an option to buy. On 20 August 2023, De Ketelaere came off the bench during Atalanta's Serie A match against Sassuolo, striking the crossbar before sealing his debut Serie A goal with a precise header. The match ended 2–0 in Atalanta's favour. On 21 September, De Ketelaere marked his presence by netting his first goal in a UEFA Europa League group stage match against Raków Częstochowa, contributing to Atalanta's 2–0 victory. De Ketelaere scored 14 goals and provided 11 assists in all competitions during his first season at Atalanta; the club made his move permanent on 15 June 2024. Later that year, on 26 November, he scored a brace and provided a hat-trick of assists in a 6–1 away victory over Young Boys in the Champions League.

== International career ==
De Ketelaere playing for Belgium in 2026

In November 2020, De Ketelaere debuted for the Belgian senior squad as a substitute in a loss to Switzerland for the 2020–21 UEFA Nations League. On 10 October 2021, he scored his first international goal in the third place playoff match loss to Italy for the Nations League, 2–1. In a 2022 FIFA World Cup match against Morocco, De Ketelaere came on as a substitute for Michy Batshuayi in the 75th minute.

At the 2026 FIFA World Cup, he scored two goals, provided an assist and was named Man of the Match in a 4–1 victory against host nation the United States in the round of 16. He scored the equalizing goal in the quarter-final against Spain, although Belgium eventually succumbed to a 2–1 defeat. It was the only goal Spain conceded in their ultimately victorious World Cup campaign. Hence, he equalled Romelu Lukaku's record of three goals for the most knockout-stage goals by a Belgian player in World Cup history.

== Career statistics ==
=== Club ===
As of match played 22 November 2026

Appearances and goals by club, season and competition
Club	Season	League			National cup (Note: Includes Belgian Cup, Coppa Italia)		Europe		Other		Total	
Club	Season	Division	Apps	Goals	Apps	Goals	Apps	Goals	Apps	Goals	Apps	Goals
Club Brugge	2019–20	Belgian Pro League	13	1	6	1	6 (Note: Four appearances in UEFA Champions League, two appearances in UEFA Europa League)	0	—		25	2
Club Brugge	2020–21	Belgian Pro League	38	4	1	0	7 (Note: Six appearances and two goals in UEFA Champions League, one appearance in UEFA Europa League)	2	—		46	6
Club Brugge	2021–22	Belgian Pro League	39	14	3	4	6 (Note: Appearances in UEFA Champions League)	0	1 (Note: Appearance in Belgian Super Cup)	0	49	18
Club Brugge	Total		90	19	10	5	19	2	1	0	120	26
AC Milan	2022–23	Serie A	32	0	1	0	6	0	1 (Note: Appearance in Supercoppa Italiana)	0	40	0
Atalanta (loan)	2023–24	Serie A	35	10	4	2	11 (Note: Appearances in UEFA Europa League)	2	—		50	14
Atalanta	2024–25	Serie A	36	7	2	2	10	4	2 (Note: One appearance in UEFA Super Cup, one appearance in Supercoppa Italiana)	0	50	13
Atalanta	2025–26	Serie A	31	3	3	0	8	2	—		42	5
Atalanta	2026–27	Serie A	12	3	0	0	4 (Note: Appearances in UEFA Conference League)	0	—		16	3
Atalanta	Atalanta total		114	23	9	4	33	8	2	0	158	35
Career total			236	42	20	9	58	10	4	0	318	61

=== International ===
As of match played 15 November 2026

Appearances and goals by national team and year
National team	Year	Apps	Goals
Belgium	2020	1	0
Belgium	2021	3	1
Belgium	2022	7	0
Belgium	2023	3	1
Belgium	2024	6	0
Belgium	2025	6	1
Belgium	2026	15	6
Total		41	9

Scores and results list Belgium's goal tally first, score column indicates score after each De Ketelaere goal.

List of international goals scored by Charles De Ketelaere
No.	Date	Venue	Cap	Opponent	Score	Result	Competition
1	10 October 2021	Juventus Stadium, Turin, Italy	2	Italy	1–2	1–2	2021 UEFA Nations League Finals
2	12 September 2023	King Baudouin Stadium, Brussels, Belgium	13	Estonia	5–0	5–0	UEFA Euro 2024 qualifying
3	18 November 2025	Stade Maurice Dufrasne, Liège, Belgium	26	Liechtenstein	6–0	7–0	2026 FIFA World Cup qualification
4	18 November 2025	Stade Maurice Dufrasne, Liège, Belgium	26	Liechtenstein	7–0	7–0	2026 FIFA World Cup qualification
5	28 March 2026	Mercedes-Benz Stadium, Atlanta, United States	27	United States	3–1	5–2	Friendly
6	6 June 2026	King Baudouin Stadium, Brussels, Belgium	30	Tunisia	2–0	5–0	Friendly
7	6 July 2026	Lumen Field, Seattle, United States	34	United States	1–0	4–1	2026 FIFA World Cup
8	6 July 2026	Lumen Field, Seattle, United States	34	United States	2–1	4–1	2026 FIFA World Cup
9	10 July 2026	SoFi Stadium, Inglewood, United States	35	Spain	1–1	1–2	2026 FIFA World Cup
10	12 November 2026	Gürsel Aksel Stadium, İzmir, Turkey	40	Turkey	2–1	2–1	2026–27 UEFA Nations League A

== Honours ==
Club Brugge

- Belgian First Division A: 2019–20, 2020–21, 2021–22
- Belgian Super Cup: 2021

Atalanta

- UEFA Europa League: 2023–24
- Coppa Italia runner-up: 2023–24

Individual

- Belgian Promising Talent of the Year: 2020
- Best Youngster of the Belgian Pro League: 2020, 2021
- Dominique D'Onofrio Award: 2020
- Belgian Young Professional Footballer of the Year: 2021–22
- Golden Shoe Best Belgian Abroad: 2024
