= Youssouph Badji =

Senegalese footballer (born 2001)

Personal information
- Full name: Youssouph Mamadou Badji
- Date of birth: 20 December 2001 (age 24)
- Place of birth: Ziguinchor, Senegal
- Height: 1.92 m (6 ft 4 in)
- Position: Forward

Team information
- Current team: Panetolikos (on loan from AGF)
- Number: 20

Senior career*
Years	Team	Apps	(Gls)
2018–2020	Casa Sports		
2020–2023	Club Brugge	26	(4)
2020	Club NXT	2	(1)
2021–2022	→ Brest (loan)	9	(0)
2021–2022	→ Brest II (loan)	1	(1)
2022–2023	→ Charleroi (loan)	37	(5)
2023–2024	Charleroi	27	(0)
2024–	AGF	21	(1)
2026–	→ Panetolikos (loan)	19	(2)

International career
2019	Senegal U20	10	(3)
2019	Senegal	3	(0)
- * Club domestic league appearances and goals as of 20 September 2026

Youssouph Mamadou Badji (born 20 December 2001) is a Senegalese professional footballer who plays as a forward for Greek Super League club Panetolikos, on loan from Danish Superliga side AGF.

== Club career ==
On 30 August 2021, he joined Brest in Ligue 1 for a season-long loan.

On 31 January 2022, Badji moved on a new one-and-a-half-year loan to Charleroi, with an option to buy. On 6 July 2023, Charleroi confirmed that they had signed the forward on an initial three-year contract.

On 2 September 2024, Badji signed for Danish Superliga club AGF on a five-year contract. On 28 January 2026, Badji joined Greek Super League side Panetolikos on loan for the rest of the season.

== International career ==
Badji made his senior debut for Senegal in August 2019, playing in a 2020 African Nations Championship qualification match against Liberia.

== Honours ==
Senegal

- WAFU Nations Cup : 2019

Club Brugge

- Belgian First Division A: 2020–21
- Belgian Super Cup: 2021
