= Thomas Van den Keybus =

Senegalese footballer

Personal information
- Date of birth: 25 April 2001 (age 25)
- Place of birth: Mortsel, Belgium
- Height: 1.81 m (5 ft 11 in)
- Position: Winger

Team information
- Current team: Westerlo
- Number: 39

Youth career
- 2008–2013: Beerschot
- 2013–2014: Mechelen
- 2014–2020: Club Brugge

Senior career*
Years	Team	Apps	(Gls)
2020–2021	Club NXT	18	(2)
2020–2023	Club Brugge	2	(0)
2021–2023	→ Westerlo (loan)	56	(5)
2023–	Westerlo	87	(4)

International career
2017	Belgium U17	1	(1)
2019–2020	Belgium U19	4	(0)
- * Club domestic league appearances and goals as of 1 June 2026

Thomas Van den Keybus (born 25 April 2001) is a Belgian professional footballer who plays as a winger for Belgian Pro League club Westerlo.

== Club career ==
=== Club Brugge ===
Van den Keybus made his professional debut with Club Brugge II in a 2–0 Belgian First Division B loss to RWDM47 on 22 August 2020. The following week, Club Brugge announced that they had extended Van den Keybus' contract through 2023. A month after his professional debut, on 27 September 2020, he also made his debut for the first team of Club Brugge in a league match against Cercle Brugge, where he came on as a substitute for Ruud Vormer four minutes before time. On 4 February 2022, Club announced that they had extended their contract with Van den Keybus for a second time, this time through 2025.

=== Westerlo ===
On 13 August 2021, Van den Keybus joined Westerlo on a season-long loan. Van den Keybus debuted for Westerlo on 15 August 2021, during a 2–0 victory over Virton. On 4 February 2022, the same day that Van den Keybus extended his contract with Club, it was announced that his loan at Westerlo would be extended through the 2022-23 season.

On 5 July 2023, Van den Keybus returned to Westerlo on a permanent basis and signed a three-year contract.

== Honors ==
Westerlo

- Belgian First Division B: 2021–22
