= 2025–26 Belgian Pro League =

121st season of top-tier football in Belgium

Belgian Pro League
- Season: 2025–26
- Dates: 25 July 2025 – 31 May 2026
- Champions: Club Brugge; 20th title
- Relegated: Dender EH
- Champions League: Club Brugge; Union SG
- Europa League: Sint-Truiden; Anderlecht
- Conference League: Gent
- Matches: 135
- Goals: 362 (2.68 per match)
- Top goalscorer: Nicolò Tresoldi (19 goals)
- Biggest home win: Union SG 5–0 OH Leuven (3 August 2025)
- Biggest away win: Royal Antwerp 0–5 Standard Liège (3 May 2026)
- Highest scoring: Club Brugge 5–5 Westerlo (24 September 2025); La Louvière 5–5 Genk (22 March 2026)
- Longest unbeaten run: 9 matches Union SG
- Longest winless run: 14 matches Dender EH
- Total attendance: 2,682,161
- Average attendance: 11,175

The 2025–26 Belgian Pro League (officially known as the Jupiler Pro League due to sponsorship reasons) was the 123rd season of top-tier football in Belgium.

== Format change ==
The Belgian Pro League was scheduled to expand to 18 teams for the upcoming 2026–27 season. Therefore, for this season, after completion of the relegation play-offs, no teams will be relegated automatically and only the last-placed team was required to play a promotion/relegation decider against the winner of the 2025–26 Challenger Pro League promotion play-offs. The winner of this decider plays in the 2026–27 Belgian Pro League.

== Teams ==
Zulte Waregem and La Louvière were promoted respectively as champions and runners-up of the 2024–25 Challenger Pro League. Zulte Waregem returned to the top level after just two seasons, while La Louvière play in top tier for the first time in their history for this season since folding of RAA Louviéroise (including four seasons playing at the third level). If counting the predecessor, they returned after a 19 year absence. They replaced Beerschot and Kortrijk who were relegated at the end of previous season.

=== Stadiums and locations ===
Locations of the 2025–26 Belgian Pro League teams

Matricule	Club	Location	Venue	Capacity	2024–25	2025–26
35	Anderlecht	Anderlecht, Brussels	Constant Vanden Stock Stadium	21,500	4th	details
1	Antwerp	Antwerp	Bosuilstadion	16,144	5th	details
12	Cercle Brugge	Bruges	Jan Breydel Stadium	29,042	14th	details
22	Charleroi	Charleroi	Stade du Pays de Charleroi	14,000	7th	details
3	Club Brugge	Bruges	Jan Breydel Stadium	29,042	2nd	details
3900	Dender EH	Denderleeuw	Van Roystadion	6,429	10th	details
322	Genk	Genk	Cegeka Arena	24,956	3rd	details
7	Gent	Ghent	Planet Group Arena	20,000	6th	details
94	La Louvière	La Louvière	Easi Arena	8,050	2nd (CPL)	details
25	Mechelen	Mechelen	AFAS-stadion Achter de Kazerne	16,700	9th	details
18	OH Leuven	Leuven	Den Dreef	10,000	12th	details
373	Sint-Truiden	Sint-Truiden	Stayen	14,600	13th	details
16	Standard Liège	Liège	Stade Maurice Dufrasne	30,023	11th	details
10	Union SG	Forest, Brussels	Stade Joseph Marien	9,400	1st	details
2024	Westerlo	Westerlo	Het Kuipje	8,035	8th	details
5381	Zulte Waregem	Waregem	Regenboogstadion	12,500	1st (CPL)	details

=== Number of teams by area ===
#	Province or region	Team(s)
3	Antwerp	Antwerp, Mechelen and Westerlo
3	West Flanders	Cercle Brugge, Club Brugge and Zulte Waregem
2	Brussels	Anderlecht and Union SG
2	East Flanders	Dender EH and Gent
2	Hainaut	Charleroi and La Louvière
2	Limburg	Genk and Sint-Truiden
1	Flemish Brabant	OH Leuven
1	Liège	Standard Liège

=== Personnel and kits ===
Club	Manager	Captain	Kit Manufacturer	Shirt sponsors (front)	Shirt sponsors (back)	Shirt sponsors (sleeve)	Shorts sponsor
Anderlecht	(France) Jérémy Taravel (caretaker) (Note: Besnik Hasi was the manager for matchdays 1 through 23, and Edward Still acted as caretaker manager on matchday 24.)	(Belgium) Colin Coosemans	Joma	Sunweb	Napoleon Sports & Casino	None	None
Antwerp	(Belgium) Faris Haroun (caretaker) (Note: Stef Wils was the manager for matchdays 1 through 15, Faris Haroun and Robert Molenaar acted as caretaker managers on matchday 16, Joseph Oosting was the manager for matchdays 17 through 30 of the regular season, and 1 through 8 of the Europe play-offs.)	(Netherlands) Vincent Janssen	Stanno	Circus Daily	Heylen Vastgoed, Ghelamco	None	None
Cercle Brugge	(Denmark) Lars Friis (Note: Onur Cinel was the manager for matchdays 1 through 29, Jimmy De Wulf was the caretaker manager on matchday 30.)	(Belgium) Hannes Van der Bruggen	Puma	Golden Palace News, Volvo Automobilia	Callant Insurance	Golden Palace Casino Sports	voetbalshop.be, Autoverhuur Meerschaert, Callant Insurance, Rodenbach
Charleroi	(Belgium) Mario Kohnen	(Syria) Aiham Ousou	Kipsta	Napoleon Score	Unibet, QNT Sport	None	
Club Brugge	(Croatia) Ivan Leko (Note: Nicky Hayen was the manager for matchdays 1 through 17.)	(Belgium) Hans Vanaken	Castore	Betsson.sport	Allianz	None	None
Dender EH	(Belgium) Yannick Ferrera (caretaker) (Note: Vincent Euvrard was the manager for matchdays 1 through 5, Frédéric Stilmant & Steve Colpaert were joint caretaker managers on matchday 6, Hayk Milkon was the manager for matchdays 7 through 26.)	(Belgium) Kobe Cools	Mills	STAR SPORT TV	Star Casino, Valckenier	None	None
Genk	(Belgium) Nicky Hayen (Note: Thorsten Fink was the manager for matchdays 1 through 18 and Domenico Olivieri was the caretaker manager on matchday 19.)	(Belgium) Bryan Heynen	Nike	Beobank, Wilms NV	STAR SPORT TV, Carglass	STAR SPORT TV	Cegeka, Carglass
Gent	(Belgium) Rik De Mil (Note: Ivan Leko was the manager for matchdays 1 through 17.)	(Belgium) Davy Roef	Craft	baloise			
La Louvière	(Belgium) Frédéric Taquin	(Argentina) Marcos Peano	Puma	Golden Palace News, Wanty			
Mechelen	(Belgium) Frederik Vanderbiest	(Sweden) Fredrik Hammar	Erreà	Telenet			
OH Leuven	(Belgium) Felice Mazzù (Note: David Hubert was the manager for matchdays 1 through 10, Hans Somers was the caretaker manager on matchdays 11 and 12.)	(Belgium) Mathieu Maertens	Stanno	STAR SPORT TV	Tegelconcept, banqup	Star Casino	None
Sint-Truiden	(Belgium) Wouter Vrancken	(Japan) Shogo Taniguchi	Olympic Sportswear	Maruhan, DMM.com	All Ads, PepperMill Casino	STAR SPORT TV	Septeni, Pauli Beton
Standard Liège	(Belgium) Vincent Euvrard (Note: Mircea Rednic was the manager for matchdays 1 through 5.)	(United States) Marlon Fossey	Macron	Circus Daily	None	None	None
Union SG	(Belgium) David Hubert (Note: Sébastien Pocognoli was the manager for matchdays 1 through 10.)	(England) Christian Burgess	Nike	Lotto			
Westerlo	(Belgium) Issame Charaï	(Turkey) Doğucan Haspolat	Nike	Soudal		Keukens Van Lommel	
Zulte Waregem	(Belgium) Steve Colpaert (Note: Sven Vandenbroeck was the manager for matchdays 1 through 28.)	(Belgium) Jelle Vossen	Patrick	_lamett, Elindus			DL Chemicals, Nollens

=== Managerial changes ===
Team	Outgoing manager	Manner of departure	Date of vacancy	Position	Replaced by	Date of appointment
Gent	(Bosnia and Herzegovina) Danijel Milićević	Sacked	30 June 2025	Pre-season	(Croatia) Ivan Leko	5 June 2025
Standard Liège	(Croatia) Ivan Leko	Signed by Gent	30 June 2025	Pre-season	(Romania) Mircea Rednic	16 June 2025
OH Leuven	(Wales) Chris Coleman	Sacked	30 June 2025	Pre-season	(Belgium) David Hubert	16 June 2025
Westerlo	(Belgium) Timmy Simons	Mutual consent	30 June 2025	Pre-season	(Belgium) Issame Charaï	17 June 2025
Cercle Brugge	(Germany) Bernd Storck	Mutual consent	30 June 2025	Pre-season	(Germany) Onur Cinel	19 June 2025
Antwerp	(Netherlands) Andries Ulderink	End of contract	30 June 2025	Pre-season	(Belgium) Stef Wils	22 June 2025
Dender EH	(Belgium) Vincent Euvrard	Signed by Standard Liège	27 August 2025	16th	(Belgium) Frédéric Stilmant & (Belgium) Steve Colpaert (caretakers)	27 August 2025
Standard Liège	(Romania) Mircea Rednic	Sacked	27 August 2025	8th	(Belgium) Vincent Euvrard	27 August 2025
Dender EH	(Belgium) Frédéric Stilmant & (Belgium) Steve Colpaert (caretakers)	Caretakers replaced	6 September 2025	16th	(Belgium) Hayk Milkon	6 September 2025
Union SG	(Belgium) Sébastien Pocognoli	Signed by Monaco	9 October 2025	1st	(Belgium) David Hubert	13 October 2025
OH Leuven	(Belgium) David Hubert	Signed by Union SG	13 October 2025	15th	(Belgium) Hans Somers (caretaker)	13 October 2025
OH Leuven	(Belgium) Hans Somers	Caretaker replaced	26 October 2025	15th	(Belgium) Felice Mazzù	26 October 2025
Antwerp	(Belgium) Stef Wils	Sacked	23 November 2025	14th	(Belgium) Faris Haroun & (Netherlands) Robert Molenaar (caretakers)	23 November 2025
Antwerp	(Belgium) Faris Haroun & (Netherlands) Robert Molenaar (caretakers)	Caretakers replaced	27 November 2025	14th	(Netherlands) Joseph Oosting	27 November 2025 (Note: While the announcement of Joseph Oosting's signature at Antwerp was already made on 27 November 2025, caretakers Haroun and Molenaar remained in charge as caretaker managers for the upcoming match three days later against Club Brugge. Oosting only officially took up the position on 1 December 2025.)
Club Brugge	(Belgium) Nicky Hayen	Sacked	8 December 2025	3rd	(Croatia) Ivan Leko	8 December 2025
Gent	(Croatia) Ivan Leko	Signed by Club Brugge	8 December 2025	7th	(Belgium) Rik De Mil	10 December 2025
Charleroi	(Belgium) Rik De Mil	Signed by Gent	10 December 2025	12th	(Belgium) Hans Cornelis (Note: Hans Cornelis was initially appointed as caretaker manager, but on 6 January 2026, Charleroi appointed Cornelis as full-time manager.)	10 December 2025
Genk	(Germany) Thorsten Fink	Sacked	15 December 2025	7th	(Belgium) Domenico Olivieri (caretaker)	15 December 2025
Genk	(Belgium) Domenico Olivieri (caretaker)	Caretaker replaced	22 December 2025	7th	(Belgium) Nicky Hayen	22 December 2025
Anderlecht	(Kosovo) Besnik Hasi	Sacked	1 February 2026	4th	(Belgium) Edward Still (caretaker)	1 February 2026
Anderlecht	(Belgium) Edward Still	Signed by Watford	9 February 2026	4th	(France) Jérémy Taravel (caretaker)	9 February 2026
Dender EH	(Belgium) Hayk Milkon	Sacked	25 February 2026	16th	(Belgium) Yannick Ferrera	26 February 2026
Zulte Waregem	(Belgium) Sven Vandenbroeck	Sacked	9 March 2026	12th	(Belgium) Steve Colpaert (Note: Steve Colpaert was initially appointed as caretaker manager, but on 26 March 2026, Zulte Waregem appointed Colpaert as full-time manager.)	9 March 2026
Cercle Brugge	(Germany) Onur Cinel	Sacked	18 March 2026	15th	(Belgium) Jimmy De Wulf (caretaker)	18 March 2026
Cercle Brugge	(Belgium) Jimmy De Wulf	Caretaker replaced	20 March 2026	15th	(Denmark) Lars Friis	20 March 2026 (Note: While the announcement of Lars Friis' signature at Cercle Brugge was already made on 20 March 2026, caretaker Jimmy De Wulf remained in charge as caretaker manager for the upcoming match two days later against Anderlecht. Friis only officially took up the position on 23 March 2026.)
Charleroi	(Belgium) Hans Cornelis	Sacked	7 April 2026	5th (Europe play-offs)	(Belgium) Mario Kohnen (Note: Mario Kohnen was initially appointed as caretaker manager, but on 17 June 2026, Charleroi appointed Kohnen as full-time manager.)	7 April 2026
La Louvière	(Belgium) Frédéric Taquin	Sacked	9 May 2026 (Note: While the announcement of the split with Frédéric Taquin was already made on 8 May 2026, he remained in charge for the final match one day later on 9 May 2026.)	3rd (Relegation play-offs)	not replaced (season ended)	
Antwerp	(Netherlands) Joseph Oosting	Sacked	17 May 2026	5th (Europe play-offs)	(Belgium) Faris Haroun (caretaker)	17 May 2026

== Regular season ==
=== League table ===
Pos	Team	Pld	W	D	L	GF	GA	GD	Pts	Qualification or relegation
1	Union SG	30	19	9	2	50	17	+33	66	Qualification for the Europa League and Champions' play-offs (Note: The regular season winners will qualify for the 2026–27 UEFA Europa League if not earning a 2026–27 UEFA Champions League place in the playoff.)
2	Club Brugge	30	20	3	7	59	36	+23	63	Qualification for the Champions' play-offs
3	Sint-Truiden	30	18	3	9	47	35	+12	57	Qualification for the Champions' play-offs
4	Gent	30	13	6	11	49	43	+6	45	Qualification for the Champions' play-offs
5	Mechelen	30	12	9	9	39	37	+2	45	Qualification for the Champions' play-offs
6	Anderlecht	30	12	8	10	43	39	+4	44	Qualification for the Champions' play-offs
7	Genk	30	11	9	10	46	47	−1	42	Qualification for the Europe play-offs
8	Standard Liège	30	11	7	12	27	35	−8	40	Qualification for the Europe play-offs
9	Westerlo	30	10	9	11	36	40	−4	39	Qualification for the Europe play-offs
10	Antwerp	30	9	8	13	31	32	−1	35	Qualification for the Europe play-offs
11	Charleroi	30	9	7	14	38	42	−4	34	Qualification for the Europe play-offs
12	OH Leuven	30	9	7	14	32	43	−11	34	Qualification for the Europe play-offs
13	Zulte Waregem	30	8	8	14	38	47	−9	32	Qualification for the Relegation play-offs
14	Cercle Brugge	30	7	10	13	39	47	−8	31	Qualification for the Relegation play-offs
15	La Louvière	30	6	13	11	30	37	−7	31	Qualification for the Relegation play-offs
16	Dender EH	30	3	10	17	24	51	−27	19	Qualification for the Relegation play-offs

Source: Jupiler Pro League (in Dutch)
Rules for classification: 1) Points; 2) Matches won; 3) Goal difference; 4) Goals scored; 5) Away matches won; 6) Away goal difference; 7) Away goals scored; 8) Play-off.

=== Positions by round ===
The table lists the positions of teams after each round, with postponed matches and points deductions included only when they occur. Teams with fewer matches played are shown with their position underlined, with each line representing one fewer match.

Colored cells refer to being in Champions' Play-offs (green), in Europe Play-offs (blue), or Relegation play-offs (red).

Team ╲ Round	1	2	3	4	5	6	7	8	9	10	11	12	13	14	15	16	17	18	19	20	21	22	23	24	25	26	27	28	29	30
Union SG	7	2	1	1	2	1	1	1	1	1	1	1	1	1	1	1	1	1	1	1	1	1	1	1	1	1	1	1	1	1
Club Brugge	4	6	6	4	4	4	5	3	2	2	2	2	2	2	2	2	3	2	2	2	3	3	3	3	3	3	2	2	2	2
Sint-Truiden	2	3	2	2	1	2	2	2	6	5	5	7	4	4	4	4	2	4	3	3	2	2	2	2	2	2	3	3	3	3
Gent	14	8	10	10	10	13	11	7	5	4	7	3	5	5	6	7	7	9	10	8	6	5	5	6	5	6	7	6	6	4
Mechelen	7	5	4	5	6	3	3	4	3	6	4	4	6	6	5	5	5	5	5	5	5	6	7	5	6	5	5	5	4	5
Anderlecht	1	1	5	3	3	5	4	6	4	3	3	5	3	3	3	3	4	3	4	4	4	4	4	4	4	4	4	4	5	6
Genk	13	12	14	8	9	8	10	14	9	7	8	8	7	7	8	6	8	7	7	9	11	11	10	8	7	7	6	8	7	7
Standard Liège	3	4	3	6	8	9	12	8	11	12	12	11	9	10	10	8	6	6	6	6	7	8	8	9	9	8	8	7	8	8
Westerlo	16	7	9	13	14	11	6	12	12	9	9	9	11	12	12	13	11	11	9	10	12	12	11	12	10	9	9	9	9	9
Antwerp	9	10	7	7	5	6	8	11	13	13	14	14	15	14	14	12	10	8	8	7	8	9	9	10	11	11	10	10	10	10
Charleroi	5	9	12	14	15	12	7	5	8	10	11	10	12	9	9	10	12	12	12	11	9	7	6	7	8	10	11	11	11	11
OH Leuven	6	15	16	16	13	10	15	15	15	15	15	15	13	13	13	14	14	13	13	13	14	14	14	13	13	13	13	13	12	12
Zulte Waregem	9	13	8	11	12	15	13	9	7	8	6	6	8	8	7	9	9	10	11	12	10	10	12	11	12	12	12	12	14	13
Cercle Brugge	11	14	15	9	7	7	9	13	14	14	13	13	14	15	15	15	15	15	15	15	15	15	15	14	15	14	14	14	15	14
La Louvière	15	16	11	12	11	14	14	10	10	11	10	12	10	11	11	11	13	14	14	14	13	13	13	15	14	15	15	15	13	15
Dender EH	11	11	13	15	16	16	16	16	16	16	16	16	16	16	16	16	16	16	16	16	16	16	16	16	16	16	16	16	16	16

Source: vbal4.be

=== Results ===
Home \ Away	USG	CLU	STR	GNT	MEC	AND	GNK	STA	WES	ANT	CHA	OHL	ZWA	CER	LAL	DEN
Union SG		1–0	2–0	1–1	1–0	2–0	2–1	3–0	2–0	2–1	3–1	5–0	2–0	2–0	2–1	2–0
Club Brugge	1–0		2–0	2–1	4–1	2–2	2–1	3–0	5–5	0–1	1–0	2–1	4–3	2–0	2–3	2–1
Sint-Truiden	1–3	3–2		3–1	1–0	2–2	1–2	1–0	0–3	1–0	0–2	1–0	3–2	2–1	2–1	2–0
Gent	2–3	1–1	1–2		3–1	4–2	1–1	4–0	2–0	0–2	2–1	1–3	2–0	0–1	1–0	3–0
Mechelen	1–1	2–1	1–3	1–1		1–0	2–3	0–1	1–1	2–0	1–0	1–1	2–1	0–0	3–2	1–1
Anderlecht	1–0	1–0	2–1	1–0	3–1		1–1	1–0	5–2	0–0	1–2	5–1	2–3	2–3	0–0	0–0
Genk	1–2	3–5	1–0	3–0	0–1	2–0		0–3	1–1	1–1	0–1	2–1	3–2	1–1	1–1	2–1
Standard Liège	1–1	1–2	1–2	0–4	1–1	2–0	2–1		0–0	1–0 (Note: The match Standard Liège–Antwerp of matchday 11 (17 October 2025) was abandoned at a score of 1–0 with 88 minutes played as the referee stopped the match after being hit by a cup, with the match already having been halted temporarily two times earlier. As per the rules of the Pro League, the match was continued behind closed doors on Monday 20 October for the final few minutes.)	3–1	0–1	0–0	0–3	1–1	1–1
Westerlo	0–0	1–2	0–4	0–0	0–1	4–0	0–1	0–2		2–0	2–1	2–0	3–1	0–2	2–1	1–1
Antwerp	1–1	0–1	1–0	1–2	2–1	2–2	3–0	1–1	0–2		0–2	3–1	2–1	1–1	3–1	1–2
Charleroi	1–1	1–2	1–1	2–3	0–2	1–0	2–2	2–0	2–0	1–1		0–2	1–2	3–4	0–0	3–1
OH Leuven	0–0	0–1	1–2	4–0	2–2	1–1	1–2	1–0	0–1	1–0	2–2		1–1	0–2	1–2	3–2
Zulte Waregem	1–4	0–1	0–2	4–1	1–1	2–4	2–1	0–1	0–1	2–0	1–0	2–0		1–1	2–2	1–0
Cercle Brugge	1–1	1–2	1–1	2–4	2–3	0–2	2–2	1–2	4–1	0–4	2–3	1–2	1–1		1–3	0–0
La Louvière	0–0	1–0	1–2	1–1	0–2	0–1	5–5	0–2	0–0	0–0	1–0	0–0	0–0	2–1		1–2
Dender EH	0–1	1–5	1–4	1–3	1–3	0–2	1–2	0–1	2–2	1–0	2–2	0–1	2–2	0–0	0–0	

Source: Kalender Pro League 2025-26
Legend: Blue = home team win; Yellow = draw; Red = away team win.

== Play-offs ==
=== Champions' play-offs ===
The champions' play-offs decide the overall league champion. The top six teams of the Regular season play a round-robin tournament, with each team starting with half the points obtained during the regular season. The starting points are rounded up, in case of ties in standings at the end of the champions' play-offs, any half points gained at the start are deducted first. The points of Club Brugge, Sint-Truiden, Gent, and Mechelen were rounded up, and thus in the event of a tie on points, Union SG and Anderlecht would always be ranked ahead of those four teams.

The teams finishing in the top three positions after conclusion of the champions' play-offs qualify for European football, with the team in position four facing the winner of the Europe play-offs for the final ticket, unless the winner of the Belgian Cup finishes in one of the top four positions, in which case the fifth team will take part instead.

Pos	Team	Pld	W	D	L	GF	GA	GD	Pts	Qualification or relegation	CLU	USG	STR	AND	GNT	MEC
1	Club Brugge (C)	10	8	1	1	32	9	+23	57	Qualification for the Champions League league phase	—	5–0	2–0	4–2	5–0	6–1
2	Union SG	10	6	2	2	16	10	+6	53	Qualification for the Champions League third qualifying round	2–1	—	1–0	5–1	0–0	3–0
3	Sint-Truiden	10	4	2	4	14	11	+3	43	Qualification for the Europa League play-off round (Note: Union SG won the 2025–26 Belgian Cup and qualified for the Champions League through finishing in the top two, the Europa League play-off round berth was therefore transferred to Sint-Truiden.)	1–2	2–1	—	2–0	1–1	3–0
4	Anderlecht	10	3	2	5	16	23	−7	33	Qualification for the Europa League second qualifying round	1–3	1–3	3–1	—	3–1	2–2
5	Gent (O)	10	0	6	4	4	14	−10	29	Qualification for the European competition play-off	0–2	0–0	0–0	1–1	—	1–1
6	Mechelen	10	1	3	6	9	24	−15	29		2–2	0–1	1–4	1–2	1–0	—

Source: Jupiler Pro League (in Dutch), Soccerway
Legend: Blue = home team win; Yellow = draw; Red = away team win.
Rules for classification: 1) Points; 2) Points without (possible) half points added due to rounding; 3) Regular season finishing position.
(C) Champions; (O) Play-off winners

=== Europe play-offs ===
The Europe play-offs will be played by the teams in positions 7 through 12 at the conclusion of the Regular season. Teams will play round-robin tournament, with each team starting with half the points obtained during the regular season. The starting points are rounded up, in case of ties in standings at the end of the Europe play-offs, any half points gained at the start will be deducted first. The points of Westerlo and Antwerp were rounded up, and thus in the event of a tie on points, Genk, Standard Liège, Charleroi and OH Leuven would always be ranked ahead of those three teams.

The winner of the Europe play-offs will face the team finishing fourth in the champions' play-offs to decide which team qualifies for European football.

Pos	Team	Pld	W	D	L	GF	GA	GD	Pts	Qualification or relegation	GNK	STA	CHA	WES	ANT	OHL
1	Genk	10	4	5	1	11	6	+5	38	Qualification for the European competition play-off	—	1–1	1–1	3–0	0–0	0–0
2	Standard Liège	10	5	2	3	17	11	+6	37		0–0	—	0–2	1–2	1–2	2–1
3	Charleroi	10	5	2	3	12	8	+4	34		2–0	1–2	—	0–1	2–1	1–1
4	Westerlo	10	4	1	5	14	17	−3	33		1–2	1–2	2–0	—	2–4	3–3
5	Antwerp	10	4	1	5	12	16	−4	31		1–2	0–5	0–1	2–0	—	2–0
6	OH Leuven	10	1	3	6	9	17	−8	23		0–2	1–3	0–2	0–2	3–0	—

Source: Jupiler Pro League (in Dutch), Soccerway
Legend: Blue = home team win; Yellow = draw; Red = away team win.
Rules for classification: 1) Points; 2) Points without (possible) half points added due to rounding; 3) Regular season finishing position.

=== European competition play-off ===
A single match will be played between the fifth-place finisher of the Champions' play-offs (Gent) and the winner of the Europe play-offs (Genk), with home advantage for the team from the Champions' play-offs. The winner will qualify for the Conference League second qualifying round.

31 May 2026
18:30 CEST

Gent	1−1 (a.e.t.)	Genk
De Vlieger 120' (pen.)	Report	Mirisola 95'
Penalties
De Vlieger (penalty scored); Goore (penalty scored); Lopes (penalty scored); Omgba (penalty scored); Sonko (penalty scored)	5−4	(penalty scored) Heynen; (penalty scored) Mirisola; (penalty scored) Sattlberger; (penalty scored) Yokoyama; (penalty missed) De Wannemacker

Planet Group Arena, Ghent
Referee: Lothar D'Hondt

=== Relegation play-offs ===
The bottom four teams after the regular season will play the relegation play-offs, a round-robin tournament in which they start with the full points obtained during the regular season. Due to the league reform and the expansion to 18 teams from the 2026–27 season, only the bottom team after the conclusion of the relegation play-offs has a chance of relegation, by having to play the winner of the promotion play-offs, with only the winner of that match playing in the 2026–27 Belgian Pro League.

Pos	Team	Pld	W	D	L	GF	GA	GD	Pts	Qualification or relegation	ZWA	CER	LAL	DEN
1	Zulte Waregem	6	5	1	0	15	6	+9	48		—	2–2	4–0	2–1
2	Cercle Brugge	6	3	1	2	14	11	+3	41		2–3	—	3–0	2–1
3	La Louvière	6	1	0	5	5	13	−8	34		0–2	4–1	—	0–1
4	Dender EH (R)	6	2	0	4	7	11	−4	25	Qualification for the promotion/relegation play-offs	1–2	1–4	2–1	—

Source: Jupiler Pro League (in Dutch), Soccerway
Legend: Blue = home team win; Yellow = draw; Red = away team win.
Rules for classification: 1) Points; 2) Regular season finishing position.
(R) Relegated

=== Promotion/relegation play-offs ===
The promotion/relegation play-offs will be contested by the four highest-eligible finishers who are not already promoted directly. Normally, this will be the teams in positions 3 to 6 in the 2025–26 Challenger Pro League, unless one of the U23-teams would end up in the top six positions, in which case the next eligible team will take their spot. These four teams are to meet in a knockout tournament with both quarter-finals and semi-finals over two legs, and the highest season finisher always has home advantage in the return leg. The winner of the semi-finals will play the 16th place finisher of the 2025–26 Belgian Pro League over two legs. The Belgian Pro League team will have home advantage in the return leg; the winner of the final will qualify to play in the 2026–27 Belgian Pro League, with the loser playing in the 2026–27 Challenger Pro League.

==== Bracket ====
Quarter-finals
6	Patro Eisden Maasmechelen	1	2	3
3	Beerschot (a.e.t.)	1	3	4
5	Lommel	3	2	5
4	RFC Liège	0	1	1

Semi-finals
3	Beerschot	1	1	2
5	Lommel	3	3	6

Final
16	Dender	2	0	2
5	Lommel	3	0	3

==== Quarter-finals ====
23 April 2026
20:30 CEST

Patro Eisden Maasmechelen	1–1	Beerschot
Renson 18'		Brahic 90+3'

Gemeentelijk Sportparkstadion, Maasmechelen
27 April 2026
20:30 CEST

Beerschot	3–2 (a.e.t.)	Patro Eisden Maasmechelen
Plat 2' (pen.); Brahic 90+2'; Haraguchi 116'	Report	Asante 48'; Nainggolan 63'

Olympisch Stadion, Antwerp
Referee: Simon Bourdeaud'Hui

Beerschot won 4–3 on aggregate.

23 April 2026
20:30 CEST

Lommel	3–0	RFC Liège
Schoofs 12'; van Duiven 17'; de Grand 50'

Soevereinstadion, Lommel
27 April 2026
20:30 CEST

RFC Liège	1–2	Lommel
Hazard 29'		Vancsa 8', 18'

Stade de Rocourt, Liège

Lommel won 5–1 on aggregate.

==== Semi-finals ====
2 May 2026
20:00 CEST

Lommel	3–1	Beerschot
Schoofs 14'; Reyners 15'; de Grand 85'		Van Eenoo 24'

Soevereinstadion, Lommel
9 May 2026
18:15 CEST

Beerschot	1–3	Lommel
Wright-Phillips 83'	Report	van Duiven 48'; Schoofs 74'; Vancsa 76'

Olympisch Stadion, Antwerp

Lommel won 6–2 on aggregate.

==== Finals ====
17 May 2026
16:00 CEST

Lommel	3–2	Dender
Seuntjens 55', 86'; Vancsa 90+6'	Report	Acquah 34'; Berte 83'

Soevereinstadion, Lommel
Attendance: 6,090
Referee: Wesli De Cremer
23 May 2026
18:15 CEST

Dender	0–0	Lommel

Dender Football Complex, Denderleeuw

Lommel won 3–2 on aggregate.

== Season statistics ==
=== Scoring ===
- First goal of the season:
  (Netherlands) Vincent Janssen (Antwerp) against Union SG (25 July 2025)

Despite teams not playing the same number of matches due to the play-offs, goals and assists during the play-offs do count in determining the top scorer and top assists.

=== Top goalscorers ===
Rank	Player	Club	Goals
1	(Germany) Nicolò Tresoldi	Club Brugge	19
2	(Greece) Christos Tzolis	Club Brugge	17
3	(Denmark) Jeppe Erenbjerg	Zulte Waregem	13
3	(Belgium) Thorgan Hazard	Anderlecht	13
5	(Ivory Coast) Wilfried Kanga	Gent	12
6	(Senegal) Pape Moussa Fall	RAAL La Louvière	11
6	(Spain) Nacho Ferri	Westerlo	11
6	(Japan) Keisuke Gotō	Sint-Truiden	11
9	(Belgium) Daan Heymans	Genk	10
9	(Japan) Ryōtarō Itō	Sint-Truiden	10
9	(Netherlands) Vincent Janssen	Antwerp	10
9	(Belgium) Joseph Opoku	Zulte Waregem	10
9	(Ecuador) Kevin Rodríguez	Union SG	10

=== Hat-tricks ===
Date	Player	For	Against	Result
23 January 2026	(Ivory Coast) Wilfried Kanga	Gent	Standard Liège	4–0 (A)
22 February 2026	(Belgium) Thorgan Hazard	Anderlecht	Zulte Waregem	4–2 (A)
24 May 2026	(Germany) Nicolò Tresoldi	Club Brugge	Gent	5–0 (H)

=== Clean sheets ===
Rank	Player	Club	Clean sheets
1	(Netherlands) Kjell Scherpen	Union SG	16
2	(Denmark) Andreas Jungdal	Westerlo	14
3	(Belgium) Colin Coosemans	Anderlecht	10
3	(Argentina) Marcos Peano	RAAL La Louvière	10
3	(Belgium) Davy Roef	Gent	10
6	(Japan) Leo Kokubo	Sint-Truiden	9
7	(Belgium) Brent Gabriël	Zulte Waregem	8
7	(Democratic Republic of the Congo) Matthieu Epolo	Standard Liège	8
7	(Belgium) Nordin Jackers	Club Brugge	8
7	(Spain) Nacho Miras	Mechelen	8

== Awards ==
=== Annual ===
Award	Winner	Club	Ref.
Player of the Season	(Greece) Christos Tzolis	Club Brugge	
Young Player of the Season	(Greece) Konstantinos Karetsas	Club Brugge	
Goal of the Season	(Belgium) Hans Vanaken	Club Brugge	
Manager of the Season	(Belgium) Wouter Vrancken	Sint-Truiden	

Team of the Year
Goalkeeper	(Spain) Nacho Miras (KV Mechelen)			
Defenders	(Morocco) Zakaria El Ouahdi (Genk)	(Argentina) Kevin Mac Allister (Union SG)	(Israel) Anan Khalaili (Genk)	(Greece) Konstantinos Karetsas (Genk)
Midfielders	(Algeria) Yassine Titraoui (Charleroi)	(Algeria) Adem Zorgane (Union SG)		(Belgium) Hans Vanaken (Club Brugge)
Forwards	(Japan) Ryōtarō Itō (Sint-Truiden)	(Greece) Christos Tzolis (Club Brugge)		(Belgium) Thorgan Hazard (Anderlecht)

== Attendances ==
Belgian Pro League clubs listed by average home league attendance:

Pos	Club	Average attendance
1	Club Brugge	24,049
2	RSC Anderlecht	20,199
3	Standard de Liège	17,173
4	KRC Genk	16,689
5	KAA Gent	14,647
6	RAFC	13,857
7	KV Mechelen	12,870
8	STVV	8,394
9	RUSG	7,822
10	RCSC	7,517
11	Oud-Heverlee Leuven	7,263
12	Zulte Waregem	7,010
13	RAAL	6,572
14	KVC Westerlo	6,283
15	Cercle Brugge	5,280
16	FCV Dender	2,782

== See also ==
- 2025–26 Challenger Pro League
- 2025–26 Belgian Division 1
- 2025–26 Belgian Division 2
- 2025–26 Belgian Division 3
- 2025–26 Belgian Cup
