= 2025–26 in Belgian football =

Football in Belgium
- Season: 2025–26

Men's football
- Pro League: Club Brugge
- Challenger Pro League: Beveren
- Division 1: VV: Hasselt; FFA: Virton
- Division 2: VV A: Mandel United; VV B: Heist; FFA: Onhaye
- Division 3: VV A: Overijse; VV B: De Kempen; FFA A: Stade Mouscronnois; FFA B: Eupen U23
- Cup: Union SG
- Super Cup: Club Brugge

The following article is a summary of the 2025–26 football season in Belgium, which is the 123rd season of competitive football in the country and runs from July 2025 until June 2026.

== National teams ==
=== Belgium national football team ===
==== Results and fixtures ====
===== Friendlies =====
28 March 2026 Friendly	United States	2–5	Belgium	Atlanta, United States
15:30 (UTC−4)	McKennie 39'; Agyemang 87'	Report	Debast 45'; Onana 53'; De Ketelaere 59' (pen.); Lukébakio 68', 82'	Stadium: Mercedes-Benz Stadium; Attendance: 66,867; Referee: Esteban Ostojich (Uruguay)

31 March 2026 Friendly	Mexico	1–1	Belgium	Chicago, United States
20:00 (UTC−5)	J. Sánchez 19'	Report	Lukébakio 47'	Stadium: Soldier Field; Attendance: 52,412; Referee: Rosendo Mendoza (United States)

2 June 2026 Friendly	Croatia	0–2	Belgium	Rijeka, Croatia
18:00		Report	Tielemans 38'; Lukaku 90+6'	Stadium: Stadion Rujevica; Attendance: 7,555; Referee: Rade Obrenović (Slovenia)

6 June 2026 Friendly	Belgium	5–0	Tunisia	Brussels, Belgium
15:00	Trossard 28'; De Ketelaere 53'; De Bruyne 65'; Lukébakio 85'; Raskin 87'	Report		Stadium: King Baudouin Stadium; Attendance: 40,236; Referee: Anastasios Sidiropoulos (Greece)

===== 2026 FIFA World Cup qualification =====
====== Group J ======
Pos	Team	Pld	W	D	L	GF	GA	GD	Pts	Qualification	(Belgium national football team)	(Wales national football team)	(North Macedonia national football team)	(Kazakhstan national football team)	(Liechtenstein national football team)
1	Belgium	8	5	3	0	29	7	+22	18	Qualification for 2026 FIFA World Cup	—	4–3	0–0	6–0	7–0
2	Wales	8	5	1	2	21	11	+10	16	Advance to play-offs	2–4	—	7–1	3–1	3–0
3	North Macedonia	8	3	4	1	13	10	+3	13	Advance to play-offs via Nations League	1–1	1–1	—	1–1	5–0
4	Kazakhstan	8	2	2	4	9	13	−4	8		1–1	0–1	0–1	—	4–0
5	Liechtenstein	8	0	0	8	0	31	−31	0		0–6	0–1	0–3	0–2	—

Source: FIFA, UEFA

4 September 2025 2026 FIFA World Cup qualification	Liechtenstein	0–6	Belgium	Vaduz, Liechtenstein
20:45		Report	De Cuyper 29'; Tielemans 46', 70' (pen.); Theate 60'; De Bruyne 62'; Fofana 90+1'	Stadium: Rheinpark Stadion; Attendance: 3,158; Referee: Morten Krogh (Denmark)

7 September 2025 2026 FIFA World Cup qualification	Belgium	6–0	Kazakhstan	Anderlecht, Belgium
20:45	De Bruyne 42', 84'; Doku 44', 60'; Raskin 51'; Meunier 87'	Report		Stadium: Constant Vanden Stock Stadium; Attendance: 15,119; Referee: Radu Petrescu (Romania)

10 October 2025 2026 FIFA World Cup qualification	Belgium	0–0	North Macedonia	Ghent, Belgium
20:45		Report		Stadium: Planet Group Arena; Attendance: 18,583; Referee: Halil Umut Meler (Turkey)

13 October 2025 2026 FIFA World Cup qualification	Wales	2–4	Belgium	Cardiff, Wales
19:45	Rodon 8'; Broadhead 89'	Report	De Bruyne 18' (pen.), 76' (pen.); Meunier 24'; Trossard 90'	Stadium: Cardiff City Stadium; Attendance: 32,803; Referee: Daniel Siebert (Germany)

15 November 2025 2026 FIFA World Cup qualification	Kazakhstan	1–1	Belgium	Astana, Kazakhstan
19:00	Satpayev 9'	Report	Vanaken 48'	Stadium: Astana Arena; Attendance: 28,012; Referee: Donatas Rumšas (Lithuania)

18 November 2025 2026 FIFA World Cup qualification	Belgium	7–0	Liechtenstein	Liège, Belgium
20:45	Vanaken 3'; Doku 34', 41'; Mechele 52'; Saelemaekers 55'; De Ketelaere 57', 59'	Report		Stadium: Stade Maurice Dufrasne; Attendance: 26,253; Referee: Mohammed Al-Hakim (Sweden)

===== 2026 FIFA World Cup =====
====== 2026 FIFA World Cup Group G ======
Pos	Team	Pld	W	D	L	GF	GA	GD	Pts	Qualification
1	Belgium	3	1	2	0	6	2	+4	5 (Note: Tied on head-to-head result (Belgium 1–1 Egypt). Overall goal difference was used as the tiebreaker.)	Advance to knockout stage
2	Egypt	3	1	2	0	5	3	+2	5	Advance to knockout stage
3	Iran	3	0	3	0	3	3	0	3	
4	New Zealand	3	0	1	2	4	10	−6	1	

Source: FIFA
Rules for classification: Group stage tiebreakers
Notes:

15 June 2026 2026 FIFA World Cup Group G	Belgium	1–1	Egypt	Seattle, United States
12:00 (UTC−7)	Hany 66' (o.g.)	Report	Ashour 19'	Stadium: Lumen Field; Attendance: 66,775; Referee: Ramon Abatti (Brazil)

21 June 2026 2026 FIFA World Cup Group G	Belgium	0–0	Iran	Inglewood, United States
12:00 (UTC−7)		Report		Stadium: SoFi Stadium; Attendance: 70,317; Referee: Darío Herrera (Argentina)

26 June 2026 2026 FIFA World Cup Group G	New Zealand	1–5	Belgium	Vancouver, Canada
20:00 (UTC−7)	Just 84'	Report	Trossard 28', 50'; De Bruyne 66'; Lukaku 86'; Saelemaekers 90+4'	Stadium: BC Place; Attendance: 52,497; Referee: Adham Makhadmeh (Jordan)

===== 2026 FIFA World Cup knockout stage =====
1 July 2026 2026 FIFA World Cup Round of 32	Belgium	3–2 (a.e.t.)	Senegal	Seattle, United States
13:00 (UTC−7)	Lukaku 86'; Tielemans 89', 120+5' (pen.)	Report	Diarra 25'; I. Sarr 51'	Stadium: Lumen Field; Attendance: 66,925; Referee: Saíd Martínez (Honduras)

6 July 2026 2026 FIFA World Cup Round of 16	United States	1–4	Belgium	Seattle, United States
17:00 (UTC−7)	Tillman 31'	Report	De Ketelaere 9', 33'; Vanaken 57'; Lukaku 90+3'	Stadium: Lumen Field; Attendance: 66,925; Referee: Adham Makhadmeh (Jordan)

10 July 2026 2026 FIFA World Cup Quarter-finals	Spain	2–1	Belgium	Inglewood, United States
12:00 (UTC−7)	Fabián 30'; Merino 88'	Report	De Ketelaere 41'	Stadium: SoFi Stadium; Attendance: 70,492; Referee: Michael Oliver (England)

=== Belgium women's national football team ===
==== Results and fixtures ====
===== Friendlies =====
28 November Friendly	Switzerland	1–2	Belgium	Jerez, Spain
19:00 UTC+0				Stadium: Estadio Municipal de Chapín

1 December Friendly	Finland	1–1	Belgium	Sanlúcar de Barrameda, Spain
19:00	Sevenius 34'		Janssens 12'	Stadium: Estadio El Pamar

===== 2025 UEFA Women's Nations League =====
====== 2025 UEFA Women's Nations League promotion/relegation matches ======
24 October 2025 UEFA Women's Nations League Play-offs	Republic of Ireland	4–2	Belgium	Dublin, Ireland
19:00 IST	McCabe 45' (pen.), 62'; Evrard 54' (o.g.); Sheva 66'	Report	Wullaert 52'; Detruyer 82'	Stadium: Aviva Stadium; Attendance: 14,180; Referee: Franziska Wildfeuer (Germany)

28 October 2025 UEFA Women's Nations League Play-offs	Belgium	2–1 (4–5 agg.)	Republic of Ireland	Leuven, Belgium
20:30 CET	Wullaert 33', 39'	Report	Larkin 90'	Stadium: Den Dreef; Attendance: 7,700; Referee: Stéphanie Frappart (France)

===== 2027 FIFA Women's World Cup qualification =====
====== 2027 FIFA Women's World Cup qualification – UEFA League B Group B4 ======
Pos	Team	Pld	W	D	L	GF	GA	GD	Pts	Promotion, qualification or relegation
1	Scotland (P)	6	4	2	0	24	2	+22	14	Advance to play-offs and promotion to League A
2	Belgium	6	4	2	0	22	1	+21	14	Advance to play-offs
3	Israel (R)	6	2	0	4	10	20	−10	6	Advance to play-offs and relegation to League C
4	Luxembourg (R)	6	0	0	6	1	34	−33	0	Relegation to League C

Source: UEFA
Rules for classification: Tiebreakers
(P) Promoted; (R) Relegated

3 March 2027 FIFA Women's World Cup qualification	Israel	0–3	Belgium	Budaörs (Hungary) (Note: Due to the Gaza war, Israel are required to play their home matches at neutral venues until further notice.)
19:30		Report (FIFA); Report (UEFA)	Wullaert 26'; Eurlings 42'; Janssen 89'	Stadium: BSC Stadium; Attendance: 0 Referee: Michaela Pachtová (Czech Republic)

7 March 2027 FIFA Women's World Cup qualification	Belgium	5–0	Israel	Budaörs, Hungary
17:00	Wullaert 10', 16', 66' (pen.); Mertens 19'; Missipo 90+3'	Report (FIFA); Report (UEFA)		Stadium: BSC Stadium; Attendance: 0 Referee: Rasa Grigonė (Lithuania)

14 April 2027 FIFA Women's World Cup qualification	Scotland	1–1	Belgium	Edinburgh, Scotland
20:30	McGovern 90+5'	Report (FIFA); Report (UEFA)	Kees 15'	Stadium: Easter Road; Attendance: 4,522; Referee: Lotta Vuorio (Finland)

18 April 2027 FIFA Women's World Cup qualification	Belgium	0–0	Scotland	Leuven, Belgium
20:30		Report (FIFA); Report (UEFA)		Stadium: Den Dreef; Attendance: 4,052; Referee: Réka Molnar (Hungary)

5 June 2027 FIFA Women's World Cup qualification	Belgium	6–0	Luxembourg	Leuven, Belgium
20:15				Stadium: Den Dreef

9 June 2027 FIFA Women's World Cup qualification	Luxembourg	0–7	Belgium	Esch-sur-Alzette, Luxembourg
				Stadium: Stade de la Frontière

== UEFA competitions ==
=== UEFA Champions League ===
Belgian clubs participating in the 2025–26 UEFA Champions League:

- Union Saint-Gilloise (entered league phase)
- Club Brugge (entered third qualifying round)

==== Qualifying phase and play-off round ====
Club Brugge KV entered the Champions League in the third qualifying round.

===== Third qualifying round =====
Team 1	Agg.	Team 2	1st leg	2nd leg
Red Bull Salzburg (Austria)	2–4	(Belgium) Club Brugge	0–1	2–3

==== League phase ====
Royale Union Saint-Gilloise entered the Champions League in the league phase.

===== Club Brugge =====
Pos	Team	Pld	W	D	L	GF	GA	GD	Pts	Qualification
17	(German Football Association) Borussia Dortmund	8	3	2	3	19	17	+2	11	Advance to knockout phase play-offs (unseeded)
18	(Hellenic Football Federation) Olympiacos	8	3	2	3	10	14	−4	11	Advance to knockout phase play-offs (unseeded)
19	(Royal Belgian Football Association) Club Brugge	8	3	1	4	15	17	−2	10	Advance to knockout phase play-offs (unseeded)
20	(Turkish Football Federation) Galatasaray	8	3	1	4	9	11	−2	10	Advance to knockout phase play-offs (unseeded)
21	(French Football Federation) Monaco	8	2	4	2	8	14	−6	10	Advance to knockout phase play-offs (unseeded)

Source: UEFA
Rules for classification: League phase tiebreakers

Home team	Score	Away team
Club Brugge (Belgium)	4–1	(France) Monaco
Atalanta (Italy)	2–1	(Belgium) Club Brugge
Bayern Munich (Germany)	4–0	(Belgium) Club Brugge
Club Brugge (Belgium)	3–3	(Spain) Barcelona
Sporting CP (Portugal)	3–0	(Belgium) Club Brugge
Club Brugge (Belgium)	0–3	(England) Arsenal
Kairat (Kazakhstan)	1–4	(Belgium) Club Brugge
Club Brugge (Belgium)	3–0	(France) Marseille

===== Union Saint-Gilloise =====
Pos	Team	Pld	W	D	L	GF	GA	GD	Pts
25	(French Football Federation) Marseille	8	3	0	5	11	14	−3	9
26	(Cyprus Football Association) Pafos	8	2	3	3	8	11	−3	9
27	(Royal Belgian Football Association) Union Saint-Gilloise	8	3	0	5	8	17	−9	9
28	(Royal Dutch Football Association) PSV Eindhoven	8	2	2	4	16	16	0	8
29	(Royal Spanish Football Federation) Athletic Bilbao	8	2	2	4	9	14	−5	8

Source: UEFA
Rules for classification: League phase tiebreakers

Home team	Score	Away team
PSV Eindhoven (Netherlands)	1–3	(Belgium) Union Saint‑Gilloise
Union Saint-Gilloise (Belgium)	0–4	(England) Newcastle United
Union Saint-Gilloise (Belgium)	0–4	(Italy) Inter Milan
Atlético Madrid (Spain)	3–1	(Belgium) Union Saint-Gilloise
Galatasaray (Turkey)	0–1	(Belgium) Union Saint‑Gilloise
Union Saint-Gilloise (Belgium)	2–3	(France) Marseille
Bayern Munich (Germany)	2–0	(Belgium) Union Saint-Gilloise
Union Saint-Gilloise (Belgium)	1–0	(Italy) Atalanta

==== Knockout phase ====
===== Knockout phase play-offs =====
Team 1	Agg.	Team 2	1st leg	2nd leg
Club Brugge (Belgium)	4–7	(Spain) Atlético Madrid	3–3	1–4

=== UEFA Europa League ===
Belgian clubs participating in the 2025–26 UEFA Europa League:

- Genk (entered play-off round)
- Anderlecht (entered second qualifying round, lost and transferred to 2025–26 UEFA Conference League)

==== Second qualifying round ====
Team 1	Agg.	Team 2	1st leg	2nd leg
Anderlecht (Belgium)	2–2 (2–4 p)	(Sweden) BK Häcken	1–0	1–2 (a.e.t.)

==== Play-off round ====
Team 1	Agg.	Team 2	1st leg	2nd leg
Lech Poznań (Poland)	3–6	(Belgium) Genk	1–5	2–1

==== League phase ====
===== Genk =====
Pos	Team	Pld	W	D	L	GF	GA	GD	Pts	Qualification
7	(German Football Association) SC Freiburg	8	5	2	1	10	4	+6	17	Advance to round of 16 (seeded)
8	(Italian Football Federation) Roma	8	5	1	2	13	6	+7	16	Advance to round of 16 (seeded)
9	(Royal Belgian Football Association) Genk	8	5	1	2	11	7	+4	16	Advance to knockout phase play-offs (seeded)
10	(Italian Football Federation) Bologna	8	4	3	1	14	7	+7	15	Advance to knockout phase play-offs (seeded)
11	(German Football Association) VfB Stuttgart	8	5	0	3	15	9	+6	15	Advance to knockout phase play-offs (seeded)

Source: UEFA
Rules for classification: League phase tiebreakers

Home team	Score	Away team
Rangers (Scotland)	0–1	(Belgium) Genk
Genk (Belgium)	0–1	(Hungary) Ferencváros
Genk (Belgium)	0–0	(Spain) Real Betis
Braga (Portugal)	3–4	(Belgium) Genk
Genk (Belgium)	2–1	(Switzerland) Basel
Midtjylland (Denmark)	1–0	(Belgium) Genk
Utrecht (Netherlands)	0–2	(Belgium) Genk
Genk (Belgium)	2–1	(Sweden) Malmö FF

==== Knockout phase ====
===== Knockout phase play-offs =====
Team 1	Agg.	Team 2	1st leg	2nd leg
Dinamo Zagreb (Croatia)	4–6	(Belgium) Genk	1–3	3–3 (a.e.t.)

===== Round of 16 =====
Team 1	Agg.	Team 2	1st leg	2nd leg
Genk (Belgium)	2–5	(Germany) SC Freiburg	1–0	1–5

=== UEFA Conference League ===
Belgian clubs participating in the 2025–26 UEFA Conference League:

- Anderlecht (entered third qualifying round)
- Charleroi (entered second qualifying round)

==== Second qualifying round ====
Team 1	Agg.	Team 2	1st leg	2nd leg
Hammarby IF (Sweden)	2–1	(Belgium) Charleroi	0–0	2–1 (a.e.t.)

==== Third qualifying round ====
Team 1	Agg.	Team 2	1st leg	2nd leg
Anderlecht (Belgium)	4–1	(Moldova) Sheriff Tiraspol	3–0	1–1

==== Play-off round ====
Team 1	Agg.	Team 2	1st leg	2nd leg
Anderlecht (Belgium)	1–3	(Greece) AEK Athens	1–1	0–2

=== UEFA Women's Champions League ===
==== Qualifying rounds ====
===== Second qualifying round =====
====== Semi-finals ======
Semi-finals
Team 1	Score	Team 2
SFK 2000 (Bosnia and Herzegovina)	1–2 (a.e.t.)	(Belgium) OH Leuven

====== Final ======
Final
Team 1	Score	Team 2
OH Leuven (Belgium)	3–2	(Sweden) Rosengård

===== Third qualifying round =====
Third qualifying round
Team 1	Agg.	Team 2	1st leg	2nd leg
Vorskla Poltava (Ukraine)	0–2	(Belgium) OH Leuven	0–2	0–0

==== League stage ====
===== OH Leuven =====
Pos	Team	Pld	W	D	L	GF	GA	GD	Pts	Qualification
10	(French Football Federation) Paris FC	6	2	2	2	6	9	−3	8	Advance to the knockout phase play-offs (unseeded)
11	(Royal Spanish Football Federation) Atlético Madrid	6	2	1	3	13	9	+4	7	Advance to the knockout phase play-offs (unseeded)
12	(Royal Belgian Football Association) OH Leuven	6	1	3	2	5	10	−5	6	Advance to the knockout phase play-offs (unseeded)
13	(Norwegian Football Federation) Vålerenga	6	1	1	4	4	9	−5	4	
14	(Italian Football Federation) Roma	6	1	1	4	9	19	−10	4	

Source: UEFA
Rules for classification: League phase tiebreakers

Home team	Score	Away team
Paris FC (France)	2–2	(Belgium) OH Leuven
OH Leuven (Belgium)	2–1	(Netherlands) Twente
Barcelona (Spain)	3–0	(Belgium) OH Leuven
OH Leuven (Belgium)	1–1	(Italy) Roma
Paris Saint-Germain (France)	0–0	(Belgium) OH Leuven
OH Leuven (Belgium)	0–3	(England) Arsenal

==== Knockout phase ====
===== Knockout phase play-offs =====
Team 1	Agg.	Team 2	1st leg	2nd leg
OH Leuven (Belgium)	1–7	(England) Arsenal	0–4	1–3

=== UEFA Women's Europa Cup ===
==== Qualifying rounds ====
===== First qualifying round =====
Team 1	Agg.	Team 2	1st leg	2nd leg
Aris Limassol (Cyprus)	0–14	(Belgium) Anderlecht	0–5	0–9

===== Second qualifying round =====
Team 1	Agg.	Team 2	1st leg	2nd leg
Anderlecht (Belgium)	4–3	(Portugal) Braga	1–1	3–2 (aet)

==== Knockout phase ====
===== Round of 16 =====
Team 1	Agg.	Team 2	1st leg	2nd leg
Anderlecht (Belgium)	1–3	Austria Wien	0–1	1–2

== Men's football ==
League Division	Promoted to league ▲	Relegated from league ▼
Belgian Pro League	Zulte Waregem ▲; La Louvière ▲	Beerschot ▼; Kortrijk ▼
Challenger Pro League	Olympic Charleroi ▲; Jong KAA Gent ▲	Deinze (dissolved) ▼
Division 1	Roeselare ▲; Houtvenne ▲; Zelzate ▲; Diegem ▲	Cappellen ▼; Heist ▼; Young Reds Antwerp ▼; Binche ▼; Tournai ▼
Division 2	Mandel United ▲; Londerzeel ▲; Richelle United ▲; Braine ▲; Diksmuide-Oostende ▲; Hamme ▲; Kalken ▲; Nijlen ▲; Wetteren ▲; Flénu ▲; Tilff ▲; Sporting Bruxelles ▲; Rotselaar ▲	Olsa Brakel ▼; Lille ▼; Pelt ▼; Voorde-Appelterre ▼; Wezel Sport ▼; La Louvière Centre ▼; Verlaine ▼; Eupen U23 ▼; Westerlo (folded) ▼; Seraing (folded) ▼; Dikkelvenne (voluntary) ▼
Division 3	Huldenberg ▲; Rumbeke ▲; Wambeek Ternat ▲; Boezinge ▲; Beigem Humbeek ▲; Berlare ▲; Wilrijk ▲; Elewijt ▲; Turkse Rangers ▲; Haasdonk ▲; Evelette-Jallet ▲; Saint-Michel ▲; FC Kosova Schaerbeek ▲; Stade Mouscronnois ▲; Messancy ▲; Houffaloise ▲; Momalloise ▲; La Louvière U23 ▲	Wielsbeke ▼; Beerschot U23 ▼; Stekene ▼; Wervik ▼; Lommel SK B ▼; Betekom ▼; Bevel ▼; Rebecq ▼; Perwez ▼; Belœil ▼; Jodoigne ▼; Gouvy ▼; Hamoir ▼; Oppagne-Wéris ▼

=== Pro League ===
==== Regular season ====
Pos	Team	Pld	W	D	L	GF	GA	GD	Pts	Qualification or relegation
1	Union SG	30	19	9	2	50	17	+33	66	Qualification for the Europa League and Champions' play-offs (Note: The regular season winners will qualify for the 2026–27 UEFA Europa League if not earning a 2026–27 UEFA Champions League place in the playoff.)
2	Club Brugge	30	20	3	7	59	36	+23	63	Qualification for the Champions' play-offs
3	Sint-Truiden	30	18	3	9	47	35	+12	57	Qualification for the Champions' play-offs
4	Gent	30	13	6	11	49	43	+6	45	Qualification for the Champions' play-offs
5	Mechelen	30	12	9	9	39	37	+2	45	Qualification for the Champions' play-offs
6	Anderlecht	30	12	8	10	43	39	+4	44	Qualification for the Champions' play-offs
7	Genk	30	11	9	10	46	47	−1	42	Qualification for the Europe play-offs
8	Standard Liège	30	11	7	12	27	35	−8	40	Qualification for the Europe play-offs
9	Westerlo	30	10	9	11	36	40	−4	39	Qualification for the Europe play-offs
10	Antwerp	30	9	8	13	31	32	−1	35	Qualification for the Europe play-offs
11	Charleroi	30	9	7	14	38	42	−4	34	Qualification for the Europe play-offs
12	OH Leuven	30	9	7	14	32	43	−11	34	Qualification for the Europe play-offs
13	Zulte Waregem	30	8	8	14	38	47	−9	32	Qualification for the Relegation play-offs
14	Cercle Brugge	30	7	10	13	39	47	−8	31	Qualification for the Relegation play-offs
15	La Louvière	30	6	13	11	30	37	−7	31	Qualification for the Relegation play-offs
16	Dender EH	30	3	10	17	24	51	−27	19	Qualification for the Relegation play-offs

Source: Jupiler Pro League (in Dutch)
Rules for classification: 1) Points; 2) Matches won; 3) Goal difference; 4) Goals scored; 5) Away matches won; 6) Away goal difference; 7) Away goals scored; 8) Play-off.

==== Champions play-offs ====
Pos	Team	Pld	W	D	L	GF	GA	GD	Pts	Qualification or relegation	CLU	USG	STR	AND	GNT	MEC
1	Club Brugge (C)	10	8	1	1	32	9	+23	57	Qualification for the Champions League league phase	—	5–0	2–0	4–2	5–0	6–1
2	Union SG	10	6	2	2	16	10	+6	53	Qualification for the Champions League third qualifying round	2–1	—	1–0	5–1	0–0	3–0
3	Sint-Truiden	10	4	2	4	14	11	+3	43	Qualification for the Europa League play-off round (Note: Union SG won the 2025–26 Belgian Cup and qualified for the Champions League through finishing in the top two, the Europa League play-off round berth was therefore transferred to Sint-Truiden.)	1–2	2–1	—	2–0	1–1	3–0
4	Anderlecht	10	3	2	5	16	23	−7	33	Qualification for the Europa League second qualifying round	1–3	1–3	3–1	—	3–1	2–2
5	Gent (O)	10	0	6	4	4	14	−10	29	Qualification for the European competition play-off	0–2	0–0	0–0	1–1	—	1–1
6	Mechelen	10	1	3	6	9	24	−15	29		2–2	0–1	1–4	1–2	1–0	—

Source: Jupiler Pro League (in Dutch), Soccerway
Rules for classification: 1) Points; 2) Points without (possible) half points added due to rounding; 3) Regular season finishing position.
(C) Champions; (O) Play-off winners

==== Europe play-offs ====
Pos	Team	Pld	W	D	L	GF	GA	GD	Pts	Qualification or relegation	GNK	STA	CHA	WES	ANT	OHL
1	Genk	10	4	5	1	11	6	+5	38	Qualification for the European competition play-off	—	1–1	1–1	3–0	0–0	0–0
2	Standard Liège	10	5	2	3	17	11	+6	37		0–0	—	0–2	1–2	1–2	2–1
3	Charleroi	10	5	2	3	12	8	+4	34		2–0	1–2	—	0–1	2–1	1–1
4	Westerlo	10	4	1	5	14	17	−3	33		1–2	1–2	2–0	—	2–4	3–3
5	Antwerp	10	4	1	5	12	16	−4	31		1–2	0–5	0–1	2–0	—	2–0
6	OH Leuven	10	1	3	6	9	17	−8	23		0–2	1–3	0–2	0–2	3–0	—

Source: Jupiler Pro League (in Dutch), Soccerway
Rules for classification: 1) Points; 2) Points without (possible) half points added due to rounding; 3) Regular season finishing position.

==== Relegation play-offs ====
Pos	Team	Pld	W	D	L	GF	GA	GD	Pts	Qualification or relegation	ZWA	CER	LAL	DEN
1	Zulte Waregem	6	5	1	0	15	6	+9	48		—	2–2	4–0	2–1
2	Cercle Brugge	6	3	1	2	14	11	+3	41		2–3	—	3–0	2–1
3	La Louvière	6	1	0	5	5	13	−8	34		0–2	4–1	—	0–1
4	Dender EH (R)	6	2	0	4	7	11	−4	25	Qualification for the promotion/relegation play-offs	1–2	1–4	2–1	—

Source: Jupiler Pro League (in Dutch), Soccerway
Rules for classification: 1) Points; 2) Regular season finishing position.
(R) Relegated

=== Challenger Pro League ===
==== Regular season ====
Pos	Team	Pld	W	D	L	GF	GA	GD	Pts	Qualification
1	Beveren (C, P)	32	28	4	0	74	23	+51	88	Promoted to Pro League
2	Kortrijk (P)	32	21	4	7	59	33	+26	67	Promoted to Pro League
3	Beerschot	32	19	7	6	52	31	+21	64	Qualification for promotion play-offs
4	RFC Liège	32	16	5	11	44	39	+5	53	Qualification for promotion play-offs
5	Lommel (P)	32	15	8	9	59	46	+13	53	Qualification for promotion play-offs
6	Patro Eisden Maasmechelen	32	14	9	9	44	40	+4	51	Qualification for promotion play-offs
7	Eupen	32	12	11	9	44	36	+8	47	
8	Lokeren	32	10	12	10	45	45	0	42	
9	Jong KAA Gent^{U23} (Note: Ineligible for promotion or promotion play-offs; During the season, U23-teams also could not be relegated unless a U23-team from the same wing (ACFF/VV) finished in the top three of Division 1. However towards the end of the season, first the BMA (Belgian Competition Authority) had ruled that it was illegal to make some teams ineligible for relegation while others could be relegated, penalizing the Pro League (organization of professional football teams) with a yearly 12 million Euro fine as long as they kept the rule in place. Then, at the end of the season, the BMA intervened and abolished the rule themselves, overriding the authority of the Pro League by citing urgency. The urgency in this case being the precarious financial state of RWDM Brussels, which claimed to have found an investor who was willing to take over the club and prevent it from going bankrupt, under the condition that the club remained at the second level and did not get relegated to the amateur levels. As a result, with the rule abolished, RWDM Brussels remained in the Challenger Pro League and 16th-place finisher Club NXT was relegated instead. Two weeks later, RWDM Brussels was not awarded a professional football licence and hence was relegated to the Belgian Division 1, which meant Club NXT was spared after all. Another few weeks later, to avoid the fine, the Pro League voted to abolish the rule that prevented U23-teams to be relegated from the 2026-27 season. This puts the whole reform (removal of playoffs and return to 18 teams) under uncertainty, as this was allegedly voted as one package, and legal proceedings to reverse the decision have been started.)	32	12	5	15	42	51	−9	41	
10	Lierse	32	10	8	14	35	42	−7	38	
11	Seraing	32	8	11	13	37	44	−7	35	
12	Francs Borains	32	9	8	15	33	47	−14	34 (Note: For not complying with the rules of financial stability, in February 2025 it was announced that Francs Borains were to be deducted 1 point from the start of the 2025–26 season.)	
13	RWDM Brussels (Note: RWDM was not granted a license for either First Division B or Division 1 for the 2026-27 season. As a result, the club is relegated to the Second Division and is considered to have finished last. As a result, Club NXT was spared of relegation.) (R)	32	9	9	14	50	54	−4	33 (Note: After already having been penalized with one point for the coming 2026–27 season, on 3 March 2026 RWDM Brussels was also penalized three points with immediate effect for not being able to prove that certain debts had been paid before the deadline of 2 March 2026.)	Relegated to Belgian Division 1
14	RSCA Futures^{U23}	32	7	10	15	46	55	−9	31	
15	Jong Genk^{U23}	32	7	10	15	42	59	−17	31	
16	Club NXT^{U23}	32	5	6	21	33	55	−22	21	
17	Olympic Charleroi (R)	32	3	7	22	26	68	−42	16	Relegated to Belgian Division 1

Source: Challenger Pro League
Rules for classification: 1) Points; 2) Matches won; 3) Goal difference; 4) Goals scored; 5) Away matches won; 6) Away goal difference; 7) Away goals made.
(C) Champions; (P) Promoted; (R) Relegated

=== Amateur Leagues ===
==== Belgian Division 1 ====
===== VV =====
Pos	Team	Pld	W	D	L	GF	GA	GD	Pts	Qualification or relegation
1	Hasselt (Note: Hasselt was initially refused a license, which would have meant third-placed Roeselare would be promoted instead, as runners-up Knokke did not apply for a license. Hasselt however appealed the decision and were ultimately awarded a license.) (C, P)	30	19	5	6	76	28	48	62	Promotion to the Challenger Pro League
2	Knokke	30	19	4	7	56	44	12	61	
3	Roeselare	30	15	9	6	52	33	19	54	
4	Belisia	30	15	7	8	62	43	19	52	
5	Hoogstraten	30	14	9	7	54	42	12	51	
6	Thes	30	14	8	8	44	34	10	50	
7	Lyra-Lierse	30	12	7	11	45	44	1	43	
8	Dessel	30	11	6	13	61	65	−4	39	
9	Tienen	30	11	5	14	38	46	−8	38	
10	Jong Cercle^{U23}	30	10	8	12	41	53	−12	38	
11	Merelbeke	30	11	3	16	42	49	−7	36	
12	Zelzate	30	10	6	14	52	61	−9	36	
13	OH Leuven U-23^{U23}	30	10	3	17	56	64	−8	33	
14	Houtvenne	30	8	7	15	40	53	−13	31	
15	Diegem (R)	30	7	7	16	52	69	−17	28	Relegation to Division 2
16	Ninove (R)	30	5	4	21	40	83	−43	19	Relegation to Division 2

Rules for classification: 1) Points; 2) Matches won; 3) Goal difference; 4) Goals scored; 5) Away goals scored; 6) Away matches won.
(C) Champion; (P) Promoted; (R) Relegated

===== ACFF =====
====== Regular season ======
Pos	Team	Pld	W	D	L	GF	GA	GD	Pts	Qualification or relegation
1	Tubize-Braine	22	14	5	3	49	20	29	47	Qualification for Promotion play-offs
2	Virton	22	14	5	3	61	35	26	47	Qualification for Promotion play-offs
3	Mons	22	13	5	4	42	17	25	44	Qualification for Promotion play-offs
4	Meux	22	10	6	6	38	28	10	36	Qualification for Promotion play-offs
5	Habay-la-Neuve	22	10	6	6	38	35	3	36	Qualification for Promotion play-offs
6	Rochefort	22	9	4	9	33	40	−7	31	Qualification for Promotion play-offs
7	Zébra Élites	22	9	3	10	36	38	−2	30	Qualification for Relegation play-offs
8	Stockay	22	7	5	10	22	35	−13	26	Qualification for Relegation play-offs
9	Union SG B	22	7	3	12	36	45	−9	24	Qualification for Relegation play-offs
10	Union Namur	22	4	4	14	30	50	−20	16	Qualification for Relegation play-offs
11	Crossing Schaerbeek	22	4	4	14	24	44	−20	16	Qualification for Relegation play-offs
12	SL16 FC	22	3	6	13	25	47	−22	15	Qualification for Relegation play-offs

Source: Nationaal : 1st klasse ACFF (in French)
Rules for classification: 1) Points; 2) Matches won; 3) Goal difference; 4) Goals scored; 5) Away goals scored; 6) Away matches won.

====== Promotion play-offs ======
Pos	Team	Pld	W	D	L	GF	GA	GD	Pts	Qualification or relegation	VIR	MON	TUB	MEU	HAB	ROC
1	Virton (C, P)	10	7	0	3	18	13	5	45	Promoted to Challenger Pro League	—	0–3	1–0	2–0	2–0	2–1
2	Mons	10	6	3	1	19	8	11	43		0–2	—	0–0	3–0	0–0	3–0
3	Tubize-Braine	10	4	4	2	13	11	2	40		2–1	2–2	—	1–0	2–0	3–2
4	Meux	10	4	1	5	15	16	−1	31		1–2	3–4	2–2	—	3–1	3–0
5	Habay-la-Neuve	10	3	1	6	9	15	−6	28		3–1	0–1	2–0	1–2	—	1–0
6	Rochefort	10	1	1	8	12	23	−11	20		3–5	1–3	1–1	0–1	4–1	—

Source: Nationaal : 1ste Nationale acff PO+ (in Dutch)
Rules for classification: 1) Points; 2) Points after deduction of possible half point gained through rounding; 3) Matches won.
(C) Champion; (P) Promoted

====== Relegation play-offs ======
Pos	Team	Pld	W	D	L	GF	GA	GD	Pts	Qualification or relegation	USG^{U23}	ZEB^{U23}	STL^{U23}	STO	SCH	UNA
1	Union SG B^{U23}	10	6	2	2	18	8	10	32		—	0–3	1–1	2–1	3–0	5–0 (Note: The match played on 8 March 2026 was stopped after 77 minutes played at a score of 3–0, following a severe leg injury of Jérémie Mugabo. It was decided to replay the match in full, on 4 April 2026, which ended 5–0.)
2	Zébra Élites^{U23}	10	5	1	4	13	13	0	31		0–0	—	0–2	3–2	2–0	0–3
3	SL16 FC^{U23}	10	5	3	2	14	9	5	26		1–0	1–0	—	3–0	1–1	3–1
4	Stockay (R)	10	3	1	6	16	18	−2	23	Relegated to Division 2	1–3	0–1	3–0	—	2–2	3–0
5	Crossing Schaerbeek (R)	10	3	3	4	15	19	−4	20	Relegated to Division 2	0–1	2–3	3–2	2–1	—	3–2
6	Union Namur (R)	10	2	2	6	14	23	−9	16	Relegated to Division 2	1–3	3–1	0–0	2–3	2–2	—

Source: Nationaal : 1ste Nationale acff PO– (in Dutch)
Rules for classification: 1) Points; 2) Points after deduction of possible half point gained through rounding; 3) Matches won.
(R) Relegated

==== Belgian Division 2 ====
===== VV A =====
Pos	Team	Pld	W	D	L	GF	GA	GD	Pts	Qualification or relegation
1	Mandel United (Note: The match between Mandel United and Oostkamp on Matchday 28 was suspended after 82 minutes, with the score at 1-1, due to an alleged racist incident. Oostkamp walked off the pitch and refused to continue play. One week later, Mandel United was acquitted due to insufficient evidence. As Oostkamp had abandoned the match, they were penalized with a 5-0 loss and a 250 Euro fine.) (C, P)	30	20	8	2	60	21	+39	68	Promotion to the 2026–27 Belgian Division 1
2	Diksmuide-Oostende (Note: Only five clubs had applied for a license to play in Division 1, including champions Mandel United. The other four clubs, therefore automatically qualified.)	30	19	4	7	56	27	+29	61	Qualification for the Promotion play-offs VV
3	Lebbeke	30	13	7	10	38	40	−2	46	
4	Wetteren	30	13	6	11	50	47	+3	45	
5	Oostkamp	30	13	5	12	50	48	+2	44	
6	Torhout	30	13	2	15	54	60	−6	41	
7	Petegem	30	12	5	13	43	46	−3	41	
8	Harelbeke (O, P)	30	10	11	9	57	47	+10	41	Qualification for the Promotion play-offs VV
9	Kalken	30	11	6	13	42	58	−16	39	
10	Hamme	30	10	6	14	45	56	−11	36	
11	Jong Essevee	30	8	12	10	57	53	+4	36	Qualification for the Promotion play-offs VV
12	Jong KV Mechelen	30	10	5	15	51	58	−7	35	Qualification for the Promotion play-offs VV
13	Oudenaarde	30	9	8	13	39	54	−15	35	
14	Racing Gent	30	9	7	14	46	66	−20	34	Qualification for the Relegation play-offs
15	Westhoek (R)	30	9	6	15	45	46	−1	33	Relegation to the 2026–27 Belgian Division 3
16	Gullegem (R)	30	8	8	14	47	53	−6	32	Relegation to the 2026–27 Belgian Division 3

Updated to match(es) played on 27 April 2026. Source: RBFA
Rules for classification: 1) Points; 2) Matches won; 3) Goal difference; 4) Goals scored; 5) Away matches won; 6) Goal difference in away matches; 7) Away goals scored.
(C) Champions; (O) Play-off winners; (P) Promoted; (R) Relegated

===== VV B =====
Pos	Team	Pld	W	D	L	GF	GA	GD	Pts	Qualification or relegation
1	Heist (P, C)	30	20	5	5	85	28	+57	65	Promotion to the 2026–27 Belgian Division 1
2	Londerzeel	30	20	5	5	68	39	+29	65	Qualification for the Promotion play-offs VV
3	Young Reds Antwerp^{U23}	30	19	4	7	62	27	+35	61	Qualification for the Promotion play-offs VV
4	Termien	30	17	4	9	70	48	+22	55	
5	Rupel Boom	30	16	5	9	53	42	+11	53	Qualification for the Promotion play-offs VV
6	Bocholt	30	15	3	12	52	41	+11	48	Qualification for the Promotion play-offs VV
7	Hades	30	12	5	13	38	56	−18	41	
8	Wellen	30	11	6	13	34	47	−13	39	
9	Racing Mechelen	30	9	9	12	38	40	−2	36	
10	Nijlen	30	8	10	12	49	64	−15	34	
11	STVV Youth^{U23}	30	9	6	15	62	74	−12	33	
12	Tongeren	30	7	12	11	39	54	−15	33	
13	Cappellen	30	9	4	17	49	70	−21	31	
14	Rotselaar	30	7	9	14	45	59	−14	30	Qualification for the Relegation play-offs
15	Berchem (R)	30	5	10	15	36	53	−17	25	Relegation to the 2026–27 Belgian Division 3
16	Berg en Dal (R)	30	6	3	21	34	72	−38	21	Relegation to the 2026–27 Belgian Division 3

Source: RBFA
Rules for classification: 1) Points; 2) Matches won; 3) Goal difference; 4) Goals scored; 5) Away matches won; 6) Goal difference in away matches; 7) Away goals scored.
(C) Champions; (P) Promoted; (R) Relegated

===== ACFF =====
Pos	Team	Pld	W	D	L	GF	GA	GD	Pts	Qualification or relegation
1	Onhaye (C, P)	34	20	7	7	61	46	+15	67	Promotion to the 2026–27 Belgian Division 1
2	Ganshoren	34	19	8	7	67	32	+35	65	Qualification for the Promotion play-offs FFA
3	Verviers	34	19	8	7	45	30	+15	65	Qualification for the Promotion play-offs FFA
4	Flénu (O, P)	34	18	6	10	75	45	+30	60	Qualification for the Promotion play-offs FFA
5	Braine	34	18	5	11	63	40	+23	59	
6	Union Hutoise	34	15	12	7	47	37	+10	57	
7	Ostiches-Ath	34	15	10	9	46	33	+13	55	
8	Raeren-Eynatten (Note: Raeren-Eynatten chose to restart at the provincial level) (R)	34	14	9	11	40	39	+1	51	Relegation to Belgian Provincial Leagues
9	Jette	34	11	16	7	53	43	+10	49	
10	La Calamine	34	13	8	13	45	43	+2	47	
11	Acren-Lessines	34	13	6	15	70	69	+1	45	
12	Richelle United	34	12	7	15	49	44	+5	43	
13	Manageoise	34	11	8	15	47	62	−15	41	
14	Binche	34	12	7	15	39	46	−7	40 (Note: Binche were deducted three points before the start of the season)	
15	Aywaille	34	9	8	17	49	60	−11	35	
16	Sporting Bruxelles (R)	34	8	5	21	36	66	−30	29	Relegation to the 2026–27 Belgian Division 3
17	Tilff (R)	34	7	5	22	27	62	−35	26	Relegation to the 2026–27 Belgian Division 3
18	Tournai (Note: Tournai relegated to the provincial level due to going into administration) (R)	34	2	5	27	32	94	−62	11	Relegation to Belgian Provincial Leagues

Source: RBFA
Rules for classification: 1) Points; 2) Matches won; 3) Goal difference; 4) Goals scored; 5) Away matches won; 6) Goal difference in away matches; 7) Away goals scored.
(C) Champions; (O) Play-off winners; (P) Promoted; (R) Relegated

==== Belgian Division 3 ====
===== VV A =====
Pos	Team	Pld	W	D	L	GF	GA	GD	Pts	Qualification or relegation
1	Overijse (C, P)	30	22	6	2	70	26	+44	72	Promotion to the 2026–27 Belgian Division 2
2	Voorde-Appelterre (O, P)	30	18	6	6	54	29	+25	60	Qualification for the Promotion play-offs VV
3	St-Denijs Sport	30	16	7	7	54	39	+15	55	Qualification for the Promotion play-offs VV
4	Rumbeke	30	15	10	5	68	34	+34	55	Qualification for the Promotion play-offs VV
5	Eendracht Aalst Lede (O, P)	30	15	9	6	54	28	+26	54	Qualification for the Promotion play-offs VV
6	Olsa Brakel	30	13	8	9	53	43	+10	47	
7	Lauwe	30	10	8	12	43	43	0	38	
8	Huldenberg	30	9	11	10	35	43	−8	38	
9	Wambeek Ternat	30	9	9	12	41	54	−13	36	
10	Drongen	30	9	9	12	49	48	+1	36	
11	Blankenberge	30	9	8	13	34	47	−13	35	
12	Elene Grotenberge	30	9	8	13	45	59	−14	35	
13	Erpe-Mere	30	10	3	17	36	49	−13	33	Qualification for the Relegation play-offs VV
14	Boezinge (R)	30	6	7	17	35	63	−28	25	Relegation to the 2026–27 Belgian Provincial Leagues
15	Fenixx BeigHum (R)	30	7	3	20	30	53	−23	24	Relegation to the 2026–27 Belgian Provincial Leagues
16	Berlare (R)	30	5	4	21	31	74	−43	19	Relegation to the 2026–27 Belgian Provincial Leagues

Updated to match(es) played on 26 April 2026. Source: RBFA
Rules for classification: 1) Points; 2) Matches won; 3) Goal difference; 4) Goals scored; 5) Away matches won; 6) Goal difference in away matches; 7) Away goals scored.
(C) Champions; (O) Play-off winners; (P) Promoted; (R) Relegated

===== VV B =====
Pos	Team	Pld	W	D	L	GF	GA	GD	Pts	Qualification or relegation
1	De Kempen (C, P)	30	21	3	6	66	35	+31	66	Promotion to the 2026–27 Belgian Division 2
2	Wilrijk (O, P)	30	16	8	6	55	41	+14	56	Qualification for the Promotion play-offs VV
3	Schoonbeek-Beverst	30	17	4	9	57	44	+13	55	Qualification for the Promotion play-offs VV
4	Wezel	30	15	10	5	58	26	+32	55	Qualification for the Promotion play-offs VV
5	Zepperen-Brustem	30	16	6	8	65	38	+27	54	Qualification for the Promotion play-offs VV
6	Geel	30	13	8	9	50	37	+13	47	
7	City Pirates	30	12	7	11	45	38	+7	43	
8	Sint-Lenaarts	30	11	9	10	59	50	+9	42	
9	Lille United	30	9	14	7	43	43	0	41	
10	Achel	30	11	7	12	38	37	+1	40	
11	Turnhout	30	11	4	15	64	59	+5	37	
12	Elewijt	30	10	7	13	46	49	−3	37	
13	Pelt	30	7	4	19	30	71	−41	25	Qualification for the Relegation play-offs VV
14	Zwarte Leeuw (R)	30	6	7	17	22	51	−29	25	Relegation to the 2026–27 Belgian Provincial Leagues
15	Haasdonk (R)	30	6	6	18	42	64	−22	24	Relegation to the 2026–27 Belgian Provincial Leagues
16	Turkse Rangers (Note: Turkse Rangers did not apply for a license to compete at this level next season and therefore will be relegated regardless of their finishing position.) (R)	30	5	4	21	26	83	−57	19	Relegation to the 2026–27 Belgian Provincial Leagues

Source: RBFA
Rules for classification: 1) Points; 2) Matches won; 3) Goal difference; 4) Goals scored; 5) Away matches won; 6) Goal difference in away matches; 7) Away goals scored.
(C) Champions; (O) Play-off winners; (P) Promoted; (R) Relegated

===== ACFF A =====
Pos	Team	Pld	W	D	L	GF	GA	GD	Pts	Qualification or relegation
1	Stade Mouscronnois (C, P)	32	21	5	6	87	46	+41	68	Promotion to the 2026–27 Belgian Division 2
2	St-Ghislain Tertre Hautrage (O, P)	32	21	4	7	77	47	+30	67	Qualification for the Promotion play-offs ACFF
3	Arquet	32	19	5	8	68	49	+19	62	Qualification for the Promotion play-offs ACFF
4	Stade Everois	32	18	6	8	59	43	+16	60	Qualification for the Promotion play-offs ACFF
5	La Louvière Centre	32	18	5	9	71	69	+2	59	Qualification for the Promotion play-offs ACFF
6	Evelette-Jallet	32	15	8	9	84	63	+21	53	
7	Monceau	32	15	6	11	69	54	+15	51	
8	La Louvière U23	32	14	4	14	76	56	+20	46	
9	Biesme	32	14	2	16	71	58	+13	44	
10	Kosova Schaerbeek	32	12	7	13	56	62	−6	43	
11	Saint-Michel	32	11	6	15	50	55	−5	39	
12	Buzet	32	9	10	13	40	51	−11	37	
13	Ciney (O)	32	9	8	15	59	77	−18	35	Qualification for the Relegation play-offs ACFF
14	Aische (R)	32	8	5	19	51	83	−32	29	Relegation to the 2026–27 Belgian Provincial Leagues
15	Condruzien (R)	32	8	4	20	44	72	−28	28	Relegation to the 2026–27 Belgian Provincial Leagues
16	Loyers (R)	32	7	7	18	49	83	−34	28	Relegation to the 2026–27 Belgian Provincial Leagues
17	Jodoigne (R)	32	5	4	23	33	76	−43	19	Relegation to the 2026–27 Belgian Provincial Leagues

Source: RBFA
Rules for classification: 1) Points; 2) Matches won; 3) Goal difference; 4) Goals scored; 5) Away matches won; 6) Goal difference in away matches; 7) Away goals scored.
(C) Champions; (O) Play-off winners; (P) Promoted; (R) Relegated

===== ACFF B =====
Pos	Team	Pld	W	D	L	GF	GA	GD	Pts	Qualification or relegation
1	Eupen U23 (C, P)	30	22	3	5	91	42	+49	69	Promotion to the 2026–27 Belgian Division 2
2	Verlaine	30	18	8	4	66	32	+34	62	Qualification for the Promotion play-offs ACFF
3	Momalloise	30	16	8	6	64	39	+25	56	Qualification for the Promotion play-offs ACFF
4	Stade Waremmien	30	16	4	10	59	46	+13	52	Qualification for the Promotion play-offs ACFF
5	Du Geer (Note: As Geer and Aubel finished tied on points and matches won, a test-match was organized to determine which of both teams would take the final spot in the Promotion play-offs ACFF. The match will be played at a neutral venue, the Stade de la Cité de l'Oie in Visé.)	30	13	7	10	51	46	+5	46	Test-match to qualify for the Promotion play-offs ACFF
6	Aubel	30	13	7	10	51	54	−3	46	Test-match to qualify for the Promotion play-offs ACFF
7	Sprimont	30	12	7	11	54	52	+2	43	
8	Elsautoise	30	12	6	12	60	57	+3	42	
9	Meix-dt-Virton	30	10	10	10	48	50	−2	40	
10	Libramontois	30	11	5	14	43	50	−7	38	
11	Messancy	30	9	10	11	49	51	−2	37	
12	Mormont	30	9	9	12	44	51	−7	36	
13	Harre-Manhay	30	10	4	16	42	59	−17	34	Qualification for the Relegation play-offs ACFF
14	Houffalize (R)	30	6	7	17	36	61	−25	25	Relegation to the 2026–27 Belgian Provincial Leagues
15	Marloie Sport (R)	30	7	3	20	48	78	−30	24	Relegation to the 2026–27 Belgian Provincial Leagues
16	Eupen 1963 (R)	30	4	6	20	42	80	−38	18	Relegation to the 2026–27 Belgian Provincial Leagues

Source: RBFA
Rules for classification: 1) Points; 2) Matches won; 3) Goal difference; 4) Goals scored; 5) Away matches won; 6) Goal difference in away matches; 7) Away goals scored.
(C) Champions; (P) Promoted; (R) Relegated

=== Cup competitions ===
Competition	Winner	Score	Runner-up
2025–26 Belgian Cup	Union Saint-Gilloise	3–1 (a.e.t.)	Anderlecht
2025 Belgian Super Cup	Club Brugge	2–1	Union Saint-Gilloise

=== Managerial changes ===
This is a list of changes of managers within Belgian professional league football:

==== Pro League ====
Team	Outgoing manager	Manner of departure	Date of vacancy	Position	Replaced by	Date of appointment
Gent	(Bosnia and Herzegovina) Danijel Milićević	Sacked	30 June 2025	Pre-season	(Croatia) Ivan Leko	5 June 2025
Standard Liège	(Croatia) Ivan Leko	Signed by Gent	30 June 2025	Pre-season	(Romania) Mircea Rednic	16 June 2025
OH Leuven	(Wales) Chris Coleman	Sacked	30 June 2025	Pre-season	(Belgium) David Hubert	16 June 2025
Westerlo	(Belgium) Timmy Simons	Mutual consent	30 June 2025	Pre-season	(Belgium) Issame Charaï	17 June 2025
Cercle Brugge	(Germany) Bernd Storck	Mutual consent	30 June 2025	Pre-season	(Germany) Onur Cinel	19 June 2025
Antwerp	(Netherlands) Andries Ulderink	End of contract	30 June 2025	Pre-season	(Belgium) Stef Wils	22 June 2025
Dender EH	(Belgium) Vincent Euvrard	Signed by Standard Liège	27 August 2025	16th	(Belgium) Frédéric Stilmant & (Belgium) Steve Colpaert (caretakers)	27 August 2025
Standard Liège	(Romania) Mircea Rednic	Sacked	27 August 2025	8th	(Belgium) Vincent Euvrard	27 August 2025
Dender EH	(Belgium) Frédéric Stilmant & (Belgium) Steve Colpaert (caretakers)	Caretakers replaced	6 September 2025	16th	(Belgium) Hayk Milkon	6 September 2025
Union SG	(Belgium) Sébastien Pocognoli	Signed by Monaco	9 October 2025	1st	(Belgium) David Hubert	13 October 2025
OH Leuven	(Belgium) David Hubert	Signed by Union SG	13 October 2025	15th	(Belgium) Hans Somers (caretaker)	13 October 2025
OH Leuven	(Belgium) Hans Somers	Caretaker replaced	26 October 2025	15th	(Belgium) Felice Mazzù	26 October 2025
Antwerp	(Belgium) Stef Wils	Sacked	23 November 2025	14th	(Belgium) Faris Haroun & (Netherlands) Robert Molenaar (caretakers)	23 November 2025
Antwerp	(Belgium) Faris Haroun & (Netherlands) Robert Molenaar (caretakers)	Caretakers replaced	27 November 2025	14th	(Netherlands) Joseph Oosting	27 November 2025 (Note: While the announcement of Joseph Oosting's signature at Antwerp was already made on 27 November 2025, caretakers Haroun and Molenaar remained in charge as caretaker managers for the upcoming match three days later against Club Brugge. Oosting only officially took up the position on 1 December 2025.)
Club Brugge	(Belgium) Nicky Hayen	Sacked	8 December 2025	3rd	(Croatia) Ivan Leko	8 December 2025
Gent	(Croatia) Ivan Leko	Signed by Club Brugge	8 December 2025	7th	(Belgium) Rik De Mil	10 December 2025
Charleroi	(Belgium) Rik De Mil	Signed by Gent	10 December 2025	12th	(Belgium) Hans Cornelis (Note: Hans Cornelis was initially appointed as caretaker manager, but on 6 January 2026, Charleroi appointed Cornelis as full-time manager.)	10 December 2025
Genk	(Germany) Thorsten Fink	Sacked	15 December 2025	7th	(Belgium) Domenico Olivieri (caretaker)	15 December 2025
Genk	(Belgium) Domenico Olivieri (caretaker)	Caretaker replaced	22 December 2025	7th	(Belgium) Nicky Hayen	22 December 2025
Anderlecht	(Albania) Besnik Hasi	Sacked	1 February 2026	4th	(Belgium) Edward Still (caretaker)	1 February 2026
Anderlecht	(Belgium) Edward Still	Signed by Watford	9 February 2026	4th	(France) Jérémy Taravel (caretaker)	9 February 2026
Dender EH	(Belgium) Hayk Milkon	Sacked	25 February 2026	16th	(Belgium) Yannick Ferrera	26 February 2026
Zulte Waregem	(Belgium) Sven Vandenbroeck	Sacked	9 March 2026	12th	(Belgium) Steve Colpaert (Note: Steve Colpaert was initially appointed as caretaker manager, but on 26 March 2026, Zulte Waregem appointed Colpaert as full-time manager.)	9 March 2026
Cercle Brugge	(Germany) Onur Cinel	Sacked	18 March 2026	15th	(Belgium) Jimmy De Wulf (caretaker)	18 March 2026
Cercle Brugge	(Belgium) Jimmy De Wulf	Caretaker replaced	20 March 2026	15th	(Denmark) Lars Friis	20 March 2026 (Note: While the announcement of Lars Friis' signature at Cercle Brugge was already made on 20 March 2026, caretaker Jimmy De Wulf remained in charge as caretaker manager for the upcoming match two days later against Anderlecht. Friis only officially took up the position on 23 March 2026.)
Charleroi	(Belgium) Hans Cornelis	Sacked	7 April 2026	5th (Europe play-offs)	(Belgium) Mario Kohnen (Note: Mario Kohnen was initially appointed as caretaker manager, but on 17 June 2026, Charleroi appointed Kohnen as full-time manager.)	7 April 2026
La Louvière	(Belgium) Frédéric Taquin	Sacked	9 May 2026 (Note: While the announcement of the split with Frédéric Taquin was already made on 8 May 2026, he remained in charge for the final match one day later on 9 May 2026.)	3rd (Relegation play-offs)	not replaced (season ended)	
Antwerp	(Netherlands) Joseph Oosting	Sacked	17 May 2026	5th (Europe play-offs)	(Belgium) Faris Haroun (caretaker)	17 May 2026

== Women's football ==
=== Super League ===
==== Regular season ====
Pos	Team	Pld	W	D	L	GF	GA	GD	Pts	Qualification
1	Oud-Heverlee Leuven	21	19	1	1	52	14	+38	58	Qualification for Champions play-offs
2	Anderlecht	21	14	3	4	41	23	+18	45	Qualification for Champions play-offs
3	Club YLA	21	10	4	7	41	30	+11	34	Qualification for Champions play-offs
4	Standard Liège	21	7	5	9	24	29	−5	26	Qualification for Champions play-offs
5	Zulte Waregem	21	6	8	7	31	29	+2	26	Qualification for Play-offs 2
6	Ladies Genk	21	5	5	11	31	45	−14	20	Qualification for Play-offs 2
7	Gent Ladies	21	4	4	13	20	44	−24	16	Qualification for Play-offs 2
8	Westerlo	21	2	4	15	20	46	−26	10	Qualification for Play-offs 2

Source: proleague.be
Rules for classification: 1) points; 2) goal difference; 3) goals scored

==== Championship Play-offs ====
Pos	Team	Pld	W	D	L	GF	GA	GD	Pts	Qualification	OHL	AND	YLA	STA
1	Oud-Heverlee Leuven (C)	6	3	3	0	10	6	+4	41	Qualification for UEFA Women's Champions League	—	1–1	2–1	3–2
2	Anderlecht	6	2	4	0	8	4	+4	33	Qualification for UEFA Women's Europa Cup	1–1	—	1–1	2–0
3	Club YLA	6	1	2	3	6	10	−4	22		0–2	0–2	—	2–1
4	Standard Liège	6	0	3	3	7	11	−4	16		1–1	1–1	2–2	—

Source: proleague.com
Rules for classification: 1) Points; 2) Points without (possible) half points added due to rounding; 3) Regular season finishing position
(C) Champions

==== Play-offs 2 ====
Pos	Team	Pld	W	D	L	GF	GA	GD	Pts	ZWA	GNK	GNT	WES
1	Zulte Waregem	6	4	1	1	12	6	+6	26	—	0–0	4–1	4–2
2	Ladies Genk	6	3	2	1	10	4	+6	21	1–2	—	2–2	2–0
3	Gent Ladies	5	1	1	3	4	9	−5	12	0–1	0–2	—	1–0
4	Westerlo	5	1	0	4	4	11	−7	8	2–1	0–3	22 May	—

Updated to match(es) played on 22 May 2026. Source: proleague.com
Rules for classification: 1) points; 2) goal difference; 3) goals scored

== See also ==
- 2025–26 Belgian Pro League
- 2025–26 Challenger Pro League
- 2025–26 Belgian Division 1
- 2025–26 Belgian Division 2
- 2025–26 Belgian Division 3
- 2025–26 Belgian Cup
- 2025 Belgian Super Cup
