= Taquin (surname) =

Taquin is a French surname. Notable people with the surname include:

- Caroline Taquin (born 1977), Belgian politician
- Frédéric Taquin (born 1975), Belgian football manager, brother of Caroline
