= 2025–26 F.C.V. Dender E.H. season =

FCV Dender
- Manager: Vincent Euvrard (until 26 August)
- Stadium: Dender Football Complex
- Belgian Pro League: 14th
- Belgian Cup: TBD

The 2025–26 season is the 91st season in the history of Football Club Verbroedering Dender Eendracht Hekelgem and the club’s second consecutive season in the Belgian Pro League. The team will also participate in the Belgian Cup.

== Squad ==
=== Transfers In ===
Pos.	Player	Transferred from	Fee	Date	Source
MF	(Cameroon) Abdoulaye Yahaya	(Belgium) Francs Borains	Loan	30 June 2025	
FW	(France) Aurélien Scheidler	(Italy) Bari	Undisclosed	1 July 2025	
DF	(Morocco) Nail Moutha-Sebtaoui	(Belgium) RSCA Futures	Undisclosed	1 July 2025	
MF	(Poland) Krzysztof Koton	(Poland) Polonia Warsaw	Undisclosed	15 July 2025	
DF	(Nigeria) Benjamin Fredrick	(England) Brentford B	Loan	25 July 2025	
FW	(Ivory Coast) Moïse Sahi Dion	(France) RC Strasbourg	Free	29 July 2025	
DF	(Canada) Luc de Fougerolles	(England) Fulham U21	Loan	30 July 2025	
GK	(Belgium) Louis Fortin	(Belgium) Gent	Free	5 August 2025	
DF	(Angola) Marsoni Sambu	(Belgium) RWDM Brussels	€200,000	7 September 2025	

=== Transfers Out ===
Pos.	Player	Transferred to	Fee	Date	Source
MF	(Belgium) Lennard Hens	(Belgium) Kortrijk		1 July 2025	
MF	(Belgium) Jasper Van Oudenhove	(Belgium) Francs Borains	End of contract	1 July 2025	
DF	(Belgium) Ridwane M'Barki	(Belgium) Patro Eisden Maasmechelen	Undisclosed	12 July 2025	
DF	(Poland) Karol Fila	(Poland) Wieczysta Kraków	Free	12 July 2025	
MF	(Cameroon) Abdoulaye Yahaya	(Portugal) Leixões	Loan	17 July 2025	
GK	(Belgium) Julien Devriendt	(Belgium) Patro Eisden Maasmechelen	Undisclosed	25 July 2025	
FW	(Belgium) Michaël Lallemand	(Belgium) Stockay	Free	10 August 2025	
FW	(France) Aurélien Scheidler	(Belgium) Charleroi	€1,700,000	19 August 2025	
DF	(Belgium) Joedrick Pupe	(Canada) Vancouver Whitecaps	Undisclosed	21 August 2025	
MF	(Belgium) Kéres Masangu	(Belgium) Patro Eisden Maasmechelen	Undisclosed	8 September 2025	

== Friendlies ==
25 June 2025	VC Leeuwkens Teralfene	0–12	FCV Dender

28 June 2025	Merelbeke	4–0	FCV Dender

5 July 2025	Lierse	1–5	FCV Dender

9 July 2025	Groningen	2–0	FCV Dender

12 July 2025	Heracles Almelo	2–1	FCV Dender

19 July 2025	Anderlecht	1–0	FCV Dender

19 July 2025	PEC Zwolle	2–0	FCV Dender

4 September 2025	Jong KAA Gent	0–3	FCV Dender
11:30

== Competitions ==
=== Belgian Pro League ===
==== League table ====
Pos	Team	Pld	W	D	L	GF	GA	GD	Pts	Qualification or relegation
12	OH Leuven	30	9	7	14	32	43	−11	34	Qualification for the Europe play-offs
13	Zulte Waregem	30	8	8	14	38	47	−9	32	Qualification for the Relegation play-offs
14	Cercle Brugge	30	7	10	13	39	47	−8	31	Qualification for the Relegation play-offs
15	La Louvière	30	6	13	11	30	37	−7	31	Qualification for the Relegation play-offs
16	Dender EH	30	3	10	17	24	51	−27	19	Qualification for the Relegation play-offs

Source: Jupiler Pro League (in Dutch)
Rules for classification: 1) Points; 2) Matches won; 3) Goal difference; 4) Goals scored; 5) Away matches won; 6) Away goal difference; 7) Away goals scored; 8) Play-off.

==== Results summary ====
Overall								Home						Away					
Pld	W	D	L	GF	GA	GD	Pts	W	D	L	GF	GA	GD	W	D	L	GF	GA	GD
8	0	2	6	2	13	−11	2	0	1	3	0	4	−4	0	1	3	2	9	−7

Last updated: 19 September 2025.

==== Results by round ====
Round	1	2	3	4	5	6	7	8
Ground	H	A	A	H	H	A	H	A
Result	D	D	L	L	L	L	L	L
Position								

Updated to match(es) played on 19 September 2025. Source:
A = Away; H = Home; W = Win; D = Draw; L = Loss

==== Matches ====
26 July 2025 1	FCV Dender	0–0	Cercle Brugge	Denderleeuw
16:00				Stadium: Dender Football Complex; Attendance: 2,300; Referee: Michiel Allaerts

2 August 2025 2	Standard Liège	1–1	FCV Dender	Liège
18:15

8 August 2025 3	Sint-Truiden	2–0	FCV Dender	Sint-Truiden
20:45

17 August 2025 4	FCV Dender	0–2	Anderlecht	Denderleeuw
13:30			Huerta 71'; Hazard 84'	Stadium: Dender Football Complex; Attendance: 5,957; Referee: Lawrence Visser

24 August 2025 5	FCV Dender	0–1	OH Leuven	Denderleeuw
19:15				Stadium: Dender Football Complex; Referee: Jasper Vergoote

30 August 2025 6	Charleroi	3–1	FCV Dender	Charleroi
20:45				Stadium: Stade du Pays de Charleroi; Referee: Wesli De Cremer

13 September 2025 7	FCV Dender	0–1	Union Saint-Gilloise	Denderleeuw
18:15			Rodríguez 87'	Stadium: Dender Football Complex; Referee: Bert Verbeke

19 September 2025 8	Gent	3–0	FCV Dender	Ghent
20:45				Stadium: Planet Group Arena; Referee: Jan Boterberg

=== Belgian Cup ===
28 October 2025 Round of 16	FCV Dender	v	Olympic Charleroi
