= Luc de Fougerolles =

British-Canadian soccer player (born 2005)

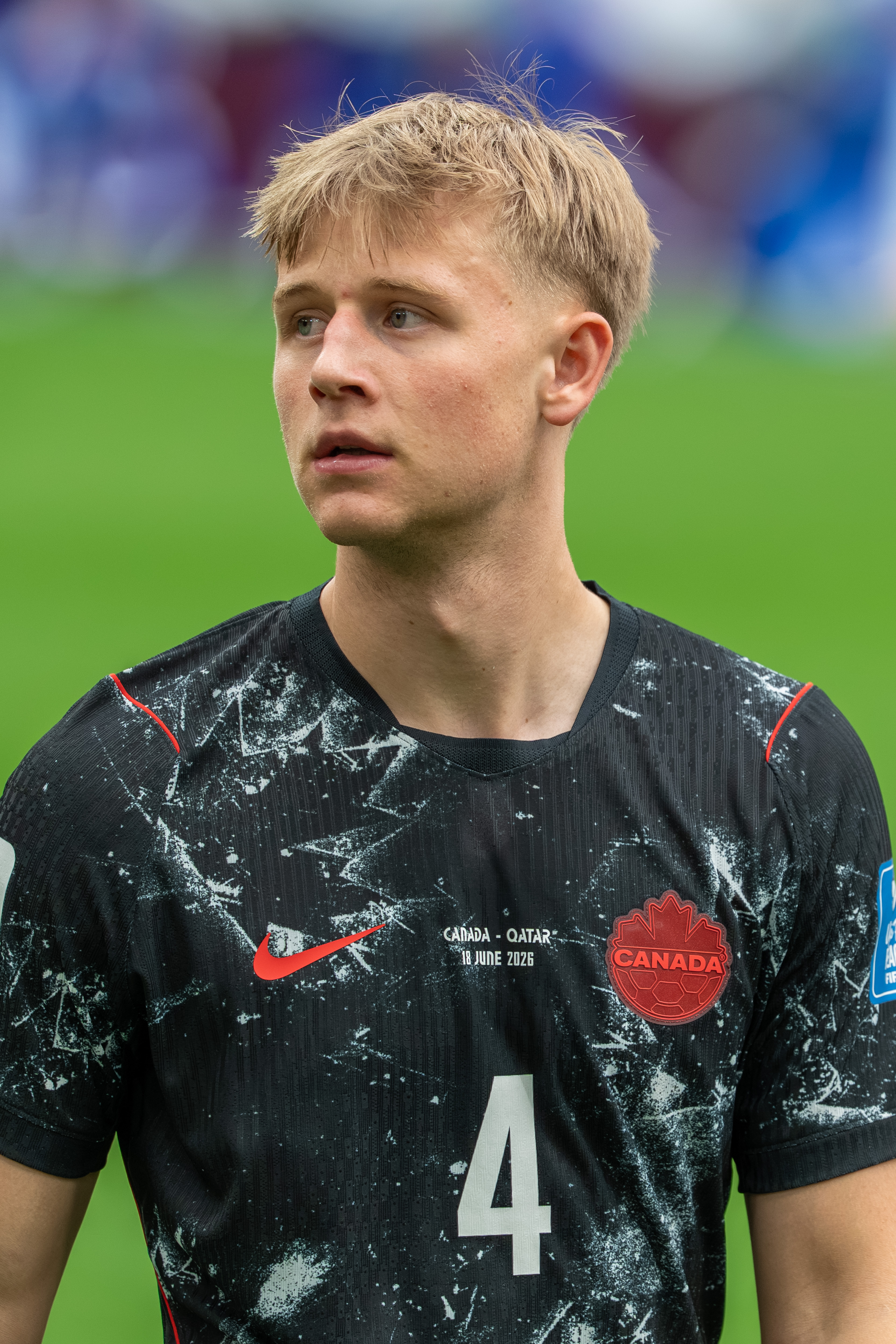
- De Fougerolles with Canada in 2026

Personal information
- Full name: Luc Rollet de Fougerolles
- Date of birth: 12 October 2005 (age 21)
- Place of birth: London, England
- Height: 1.83 m (6 ft 0 in)
- Position: Defender

Team information
- Current team: Real Salt Lake (on loan from Fulham)
- Number: 44

Youth career
- 2013–2023: Fulham

Senior career*
Years	Team	Apps	(Gls)
2023–	Fulham	0	(0)
2025–2026	→ Dender EH (loan)	28	(0)
2026–	→ Real Salt Lake (loan)	7	(1)

International career^{‡}
2024–	Canada	23	(0)
- * Club domestic league appearances and goals as of 7 November 2026 ‡ National team caps and goals as of 16 November 2026

Luc Rollet de Fougerolles (French pronunciation: [lyk d(ə) fuʒʁɔl]; born 12 October 2005) is a professional soccer player who plays as a defender for Major League Soccer club Real Salt Lake, on loan from Premier League club Fulham. Born in England, he represents the Canada national team, with whom he played at the 2026 FIFA World Cup.

== Early life ==
De Fougerolles began playing football as a 5 year old with BHFC Battersea. He moved to the Fulham Academy at the age of 8, and worked his way through their youth categories.

== Club career ==
=== Fulham ===
On 6 April 2023, he signed a professional contract with Fulham. On 20 June 2023, he was named "Scholar of the Year" by Fulham. He was called up to Fulham's senior team for their preseason in the summer of 2023. He made his senior and professional debut with Fulham in a 3–1 EFL Cup win over Ipswich Town on 1 November 2023.

On 11 July 2025, de Fougerolles signed a contract extension with Fulham, keeping him at the club until 2029.

==== Loan to Dender EH ====
On 30 July 2025, it was announced that de Fougerolles had joined Belgian Pro League club Dender EH on a season-long loan. He made his debut for Dender on 2 August 2025, starting the match against Standard Liège and playing 76 minutes. He was a regular starter during his loan spell, making 30 appearances across all competitions as Dender finished bottom of the league and were relegated at the end of the season.

==== Loan to Real Salt Lake ====
On 2 September 2026, it was announced that de Fougerolles had joined Major League Soccer club Real Salt Lake on a season-long loan. He made his debut on October 10 against the Philadelphia Union as a second-half substitute and assisted on a late goal in an eventual 2-1 defeat.

== International career ==
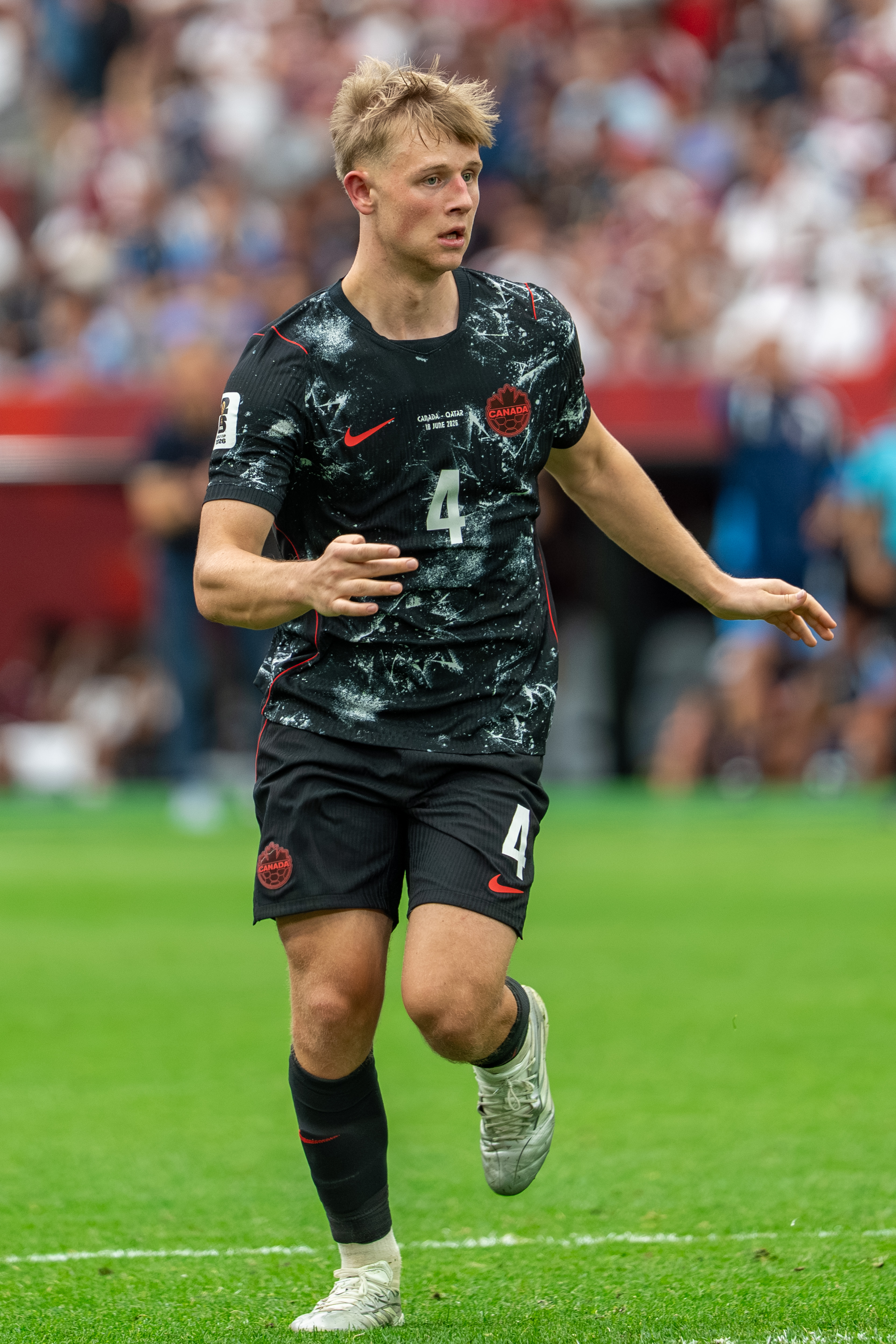
De Fougerolles with Canada at the 2026 FIFA World Cup

De Fougerolles was born in England to a Quebecois Canadian father and an Iranian-born English mother, and therefore holds dual British and Canadian citizenship.

In October 2023, de Fougerolles accepted a call-up to the senior Canada side ahead of a friendly against Japan in Niigata. He made his debut for Canada as a late substitute against Trinidad and Tobago in their 2024 Copa América qualifying play-off on 23 March 2024. In June 2024, de Fougerolles was named to Canada's squad for the 2024 Copa América and was named to the starting XI for the 3rd place game against Uruguay.

In July 2025, de Fougerolles was called up to represent Canada at the 2025 CONCACAF Gold Cup. At the end of the year, he was named the Canada Soccer Young Player of the Year for 2025. In May 2026, de Fougerolles was named to Canada's 26-man squad for the 2026 FIFA World Cup.

At the World Cup, de Fougerolles started Canada's opening match of the tournament, playing the full 90 minutes of a 1–1 draw with Bosnia and Herzegovina in Toronto on 12 June 2026. He also featured in Canada's 6–0 group stage win over Qatar. He returned to the starting lineup for the round of 16 match against Morocco on 4 July 2026, a 3–0 defeat that ended Canada's run at the tournament, the deepest in the nation's history at a men's World Cup.

== Playing style ==
De Fougerolles is a versatile player who can be deployed as full-back, centre-back or midfielder. He demonstrates proficiency in one-on-one defending, a technical first touch, and explosive movement, which allows him to contribute to ball progression from the back. He is also noted for his composure during build-up play and his mental resilience.

== Career statistics ==
=== Club ===
As of match played 19 November 2026

Appearances and goals by club, season and competition
Club	Season	League			National cup (Note: Includes Belgian Cup)		League cup (Note: Includes EFL Cup)		Other		Total	
Club	Season	Division	Apps	Goals	Apps	Goals	Apps	Goals	Apps	Goals	Apps	Goals
Fulham	2023–24	Premier League	0	0	0	0	1	0	—		1	0
Fulham	2024–25	Premier League	0	0	0	0	0	0	—		0	0
Fulham	2026–27	Premier League	0	0	—		1	0	—		1	0
Fulham	Total		0	0	0	0	2	0	—		2	0
Dender EH (loan)	2025–26	Belgian Pro League	27	0	2	0	—		1 (Note: Appearance in Belgian Pro League relegation play-offs)	0	30	0
Real Salt Lake (loan)	2026	Major League Soccer	7	1	—		—		1 (Note: Appearance in MLS Cup playoffs)	0	8	1
Career total			34	1	2	0	2	0	2	0	40	1

=== International ===
As of match played 16 November 2026

Appearances and goals by national team and year
National team	Year	Apps	Goals
Canada	2024	2	0
Canada	2025	9	0
Canada	2026	12	0
Total		23	0

== Honours ==
Individual

- Canada Soccer Youth Player of the Year: 2025
