= Hayk Milkon =

Belgian association football manager

Personal information
- Full name: Hayk Melkonian
- Date of birth: 24 August 1993 (age 33)
- Place of birth: Beirut, Lebanon

Team information
- Current team: Urartu (manager)

Managerial career
- Years: Team
- 2017: KV Zaventem
- 2017–2019: KFC Turnhout
- 2023: Club NXT
- 2025–2026: Dender EH
- 2026–: FC Urartu

Hayk Melkonian (Armenian: Հայկ Մելքոնյան; born 24 August 1993), known in Belgium as Hayk Milkon, is a football manager. He is the manager of Urartu in the Armenian Premier League. Born in Lebanon to an Armenian family, he moved to Belgium aged 3.

== Early and personal life ==
Milkon was born in Beirut, Lebanon, to an Armenian family, and moved to Antwerp in Belgium at age 3. He stopped playing football at 17, due to injuries. In 2011, he enrolled at KU Leuven to study sports science. Milkon is a native speaker of Armenian and speaks English, Dutch, German, Spanish, French, Italian, Russian, and Arabic to differing levels.

== Career ==
In 2011, Milkon began coaching under-7s at OH Leuven, followed by the youth of VK Linden, before joining Royal Antwerp to coach up to under-11s from 2013 to 2015. From 2015 to 2017 he was coaching up to under-16s at K.V. Mechelen, and achieved his UEFA Pro Licence in 2016; the following year he was hired as a scout for the Royal Belgian Football Association.

Milkon's career with senior teams began aged 23 in 2017, when he became the youngest manager in the fourth tier, for K.V. Woluwe-Zaventem. A year later he moved to KFC Turnhout in the third tier, keeping their place in the division. In 2020, he signed for KAA Gent to coach their under-15 team and be sporting director of lower age groups. In 2021, he moved to Club Brugge, initially in the youth team. In March 2023, the 29-year-old became the youngest manager in Belgian professional football, for the reserve team Club NXT in the second-tier Challenger Pro League. He became first-team assistant manager in January 2024.

On 6 September 2025, Milkon was hired by Dender EH of the Belgian Pro League, who were in last place after six games and had lost previous manager Vincent Euvrard to Standard Liège. Having just turned 32, he became the youngest manager in the league. He lost 1–0 at home to Union SG on his debut on 13 September and did not win until his ninth league game, 2–1 away to Royal Antwerp on 23 November. On 25 February 2026, he was dismissed with the club in last place and on a four-game losing streak.

On 3 November 2026, Milkon was hired by Urartu in the Armenian Premier League.
