= Nacho Miras =

Spanish footballer (born 1997)

Personal information
- Full name: Ignacio Miras Blanco
- Date of birth: 19 July 1997 (age 29)
- Place of birth: Úbeda, Spain
- Height: 1.87 m (6 ft 2 in)
- Position: Goalkeeper

Team information
- Current team: Mechelen
- Number: 13

Youth career
- 2011–2012: Guadalcacín
- 2012–2014: Granada
- 2014–2015: Atlético Sanluqueño
- 2017: North Carolina FC

College career
Years	Team	Apps	(Gls)
2015–2019	Valparaiso Crusaders	7	(0)

Senior career*
Years	Team	Apps	(Gls)
2019–2022	Linense	53	(0)
2022–2025	Deinze	72	(0)
2025–	Mechelen	34	(0)
- * Club domestic league appearances and goals as of 31 May 2026

Ignacio Miras Blanco (born 19 July 1997) is a Spanish professional footballer who plays as a goalkeeper for Belgian Pro League club Mechelen.

== Club career ==
Miras is a product of the youth academies of the Spanish clubs Guadalcacín, Granada, and Atlético Sanluqueño. In 2015, he went to college in the United States with Valparaiso University, and joined their college team the Valparaiso Crusaders. In 2017, he joined USL League 2 club North Carolina FC's youth academy. On 10 July 2019, he returned to Spain signing with Linense in the Segunda Federación. On 6 June 2020, he extended his contract with Linense for 2 seasons. On 24 June 2022, he moved to the Belgian club Deinze in the Challenger Pro League on a 2+1 year contract.

On 14 January 2025, Miras moved to the Belgian Pro League club Mechelen on a free transfer. On 12 June 2025, he extended his contract with Mechelen for 2 seasons.
