= Caroline Taquin =

Belgian politician

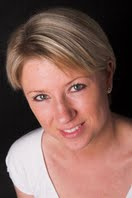

Caroline Taquin (born 1977) is a Belgian politician of the Reformist Movement (MR).

== Career ==
A teacher by profession, Taquin became involved in politics in 2006, and stood in local and provincial elections. In 2010, she became a provincial councillor after the death of Jean-Louis Allard.

Taquin was elected mayor of Courcelles in 2012, forming government with CDH and Ecolo. The former mining town had been governed by the Socialist Party (PS) for over 60 years. Six years later, she was re-elected with an absolute majority of 18 out of 31 seats. In the local elections in 2024, her party rose to 20 seats.

Having missed out on election to the Chamber of Representatives in 2014, Taquin was one of three MR candidates from Hainaut Province to be elected in 2019. In the 2024 Belgian regional elections, she was second on the MR list for the Parliament of Wallonia and was elected.

== Personal life ==
Taquin's older brother is Frédéric Taquin, a football manager for RAAL La Louvière.
