= Jimmy De Wulf =

Belgian footballer (born 1980)

Personal information
- Date of birth: 9 June 1980 (age 46)
- Place of birth: Blankenberge, Belgium
- Height: 1.89 m (6 ft 2 in)
- Position: Defender

Team information
- Current team: Cercle Brugge

Youth career
- SV Blankenberge
- Club Brugge

Senior career*
Years	Team	Apps	(Gls)
1998–2004	Club Brugge	1	(0)
2001	→ Tromsø IL	11	(0)
2003–2004	→ Cercle Brugge	33	(3)
2004–2009	Cercle Brugge	105	(0)
2008–2009	→ KV Oostende	33	(0)
2009–2012	Enosis Neon Paralimni	88	(5)
2012–2013	KVV Coxyde	20	(0)

Managerial career
- 2014–2015: Cercle Brugge (U17)
- 2015–2021: Cercle Brugge (U21)
- 2021: Cercle Brugge (caretaker)
- 2021–2025: Cercle Brugge (assistant)
- 2025: Cercle Brugge
- * Club domestic league appearances and goals

Jimmy De Wulf (born 9 June 1980) is a Belgian professional football coach and a former player who is coach with Cercle Brugge. De Wulf played as a central defender.

== Career ==
=== Club career ===
De Wulf's career took off when Belgian top teams Club Brugge and Standard Liège discovered him at the age of 12, playing for his local team SV Blankenberge. Given the fact that Liège was lying much further away from Blankenberge than Bruges, De Wulf chose to join Club. During his youth, De Wulf has been selected many times to play for the national team.

When De Wulf reached the age of 18, he was offered a contract for 5-year. Despite the promising prospects, De Wulf did not play much for Club Brugge under the coaching of Trond Sollied, and he was loaned for six months to Tromsø IL. At the end of his loan, Tromsø wanted to buy De Wulf, but Club halted his transfer. De Wulf, tired of not playing for the first team, decided to put pressure on the management. Eventually, De Wulf was loaned for one season to Cercle Brugge, thanks to the good relations between the chairmen of both teams. When the season ended, De Wulf was definitively transferred to Cercle for a fair price.

A minority of Cercle Brugge fans responded negatively to this transfer. The point of discussion was that De Wulf probably was a fan of Club Brugge, considering his choice to play for the rivals of Cercle Brugge in his youth. These rumours faded out thanks to De Wulf's great team spirit on the pitch. De Wulf used to be vice-captain of the team, but in July 2007, the new Cercle Brugge manager Glen De Boeck named De Wulf as captain instead of Denis Viane.

His contract with Cercle ended in June 2009 and was not renewed.
