= Domenico Olivieri (footballer) =

Belgian footballer

Personal information
- Date of birth: 16 January 1968 (age 58)
- Place of birth: Genk, Belgium
- Height: 1.76 m (5 ft 9 in)
- Position: Defender

Team information
- Current team: Genk

Youth career
- 1978–1984: Park Houthalen
- 1984–1986: Waterschei Thor

Senior career*
Years	Team	Apps	(Gls)
1986–1988	Waterschei Thor	32	(0)
1988–1990	Genk	36	(0)
1990–1994	Seraing		
1994–2000	Genk	180	(6)
2000–2003	Louviéroise	73	(0)

Managerial career
- 2006–2017: Genk U23
- 2017–: Genk (assistant)
- 2019: Genk (caretaker)
- 2020: Genk (caretaker)
- 2024: Genk (caretaker)
- 2025: Genk (caretaker)
- * Club domestic league appearances and goals

Domenico Olivieri (born 16 January 1968) is a Belgian football manager, and former player who played as a defender. He is caretaker manager of Genk.

== Playing career ==
Olivieri played for Waterschei Thor, Genk, Seraing, and Louviéroise. He was best known for his stint at Genk, where he became their captain and led them to their first ever Belgian First Division A trophy in the 1998–99 season.

== Managerial career ==
Olivieri coached the reserves of Genk from 2006 to 2017. In 2017, he was promoted as Genk's assistant manager. He was briefly appointed the interim manager for Genk in November 2019, and again in September 2020. He was once again made caretaker manager in December 2025.

== Personal life ==
Born in Belgium, Olivieri is of Italian descent. His son Livio played football in the youth of K.R.C. Genk, as well Senior sides of K. Bocholter V.V., FC Torpedo Hasselt and currently at KFC Park Houthalen .

== Honours ==
Seraing

- Belgian Third Division: 1990–91
- Belgian Second Division: 1992–93

Genk

- Belgian First Division A: 1998–99
- Belgian Cup: 1997–98, 1999–00

La Louvière

- Belgian Cup: 2002–03
