= Steve Colpaert =

Belgian footballer

Personal information
- Date of birth: 13 September 1986 (age 40)
- Place of birth: Etterbeek, Belgium
- Position: Center back

Senior career*
Years	Team	Apps	(Gls)
2003–2008	FC Brussels	61	(1)
2008–2015	Zulte Waregem	206	(0)
2015–2016	Royal Antwerp	49	(1)
2020–2021	Eendracht Aalst		

International career
2004	Belgium U18	6	(0)
2004–2005	Belgium U19	9	(1)
2005–2008	Belgium U21	6	(0)
2010	Belgium	1	(0)

Managerial career
- 2026: Zulte Waregem
- * Club domestic league appearances and goals

Steve Colpaert (born 13 September 1986) is a Belgian football coach and former player.

He played professionally as a defender.

== Club career ==
Born in Etterbeek, Colpaert began his senior career during the 2003–04 season with FC Brussels, before moving to Zulte Waregem in 2008. In 2020 he signed for Eendracht Aalst.

== International career ==
Colpaert represented Belgium at the 2007 UEFA European Under-21 Championship, and made his full international debut in 2010.

== Coaching career ==
After retiring as a player in 2021, Colpaert worked as an assistant coach at Club NXT for three years, and also worked as a coach at Westerlo, as a talent manager at Club Brugge, and as an assistant coach at Dender, before returning to former club Zulte Waregem as an assistant coach in January 2026. By March 2026 he had become the club's head coach, until the end of the season. He guided the team to avoid relegation. He was replaced by Michael Beale in May 2026.
