= Issame Charaï =

Belgian football player and coach (born 1982)

Personal information
- Date of birth: 11 May 1982 (age 44)
- Place of birth: Merksem, Belgium
- Position: Forward

Team information
- Current team: Westerlo (head coach)

Youth career
- Berchem Sport

Senior career*
Years	Team	Apps	(Gls)
2000–2003	Berchem Sport	37	(9)
2003–2006	Lierse	5	(0)
2006	Geel	18	(7)
2006–2008	K.V. Mechelen	46	(11)
2008–2010	Sint-Truidense	29	(3)
2010–2011	KVK Tienen	25	(3)
2011–2012	ASV Geel		

Managerial career
- 2012–2013: Al-Faisaly (assistant)
- 2013: Al-Faisaly (caretaker)
- 2016–2018: Beerschot (assistant)
- 2018–2019: Sint-Truidense (assistant)
- 2020–2022: OH Leuven (assistant)
- 2022–2024: Morocco U23
- 2025: Rangers (assistant)
- 2025–: Westerlo
Medal record
Men's football
Representing Morocco (as manager)
U-23 Africa Cup of Nations
Winner	2023 Morocco
- * Club domestic league appearances and goals

Issame Charaï (born 11 May 1982) is a Belgian-Moroccan football coach and former player who is the head coach of Belgian club Westerlo.

== Coaching career ==
=== Al-Faisaly ===
After his playing career ended in 2012, he immediately became an assistant coach at Al-Faisaly under newly appointed Belgian manager Marc Brys who Charaï previously had worked together with at Berchem Sport. The duo left Saudi Arabia at the end of 2013.

=== Beerschot ===
In July 2016, Charaï once again became Brys' assistant coach, this time at Beerschot. After two seasons, they left the club.

=== Sint-Truidense ===
At the end of May 2018, Brys was announced manager of Sint-Truidense and took Charaï with him again as his assistant. On 26 November 2019, Brys and his staff, including Charaï, was fired.

=== OH Leuven ===
In the summer of 2020, Charaï joined OH Leuven, once again as an assistant to Marc Brys.

=== Morocco Under-23's ===
On 8 July 2023, Charaï led Morocco's under-23 national team to U-23 Africa Cup of Nations success by beating Egypt in the final. Due to his AFCON success the U23's qualified for the 2024 Summer Olympics in Paris.

=== Rangers ===
Charaï was an assistant manager at Scottish club Rangers under Philippe Clement, and remained at the club following Clement's departure in February 2025.

On 13 June 2025, it was announced that Charaï had "mutually agreed" to leave Rangers.

=== Westerlo ===
On 17 June 2025, Charaï was hired as a head coach by Belgian Pro League club Westerlo.

== Personal life ==
Born in Belgium, Charaï is of Moroccan descent and holds dual Belgian-Moroccan citizenship.

== Honours ==
Morocco U23

- U-23 Africa Cup of Nations: 2023
