= Dender Football Complex =

Football stadium in Denderleeuw, Belgium

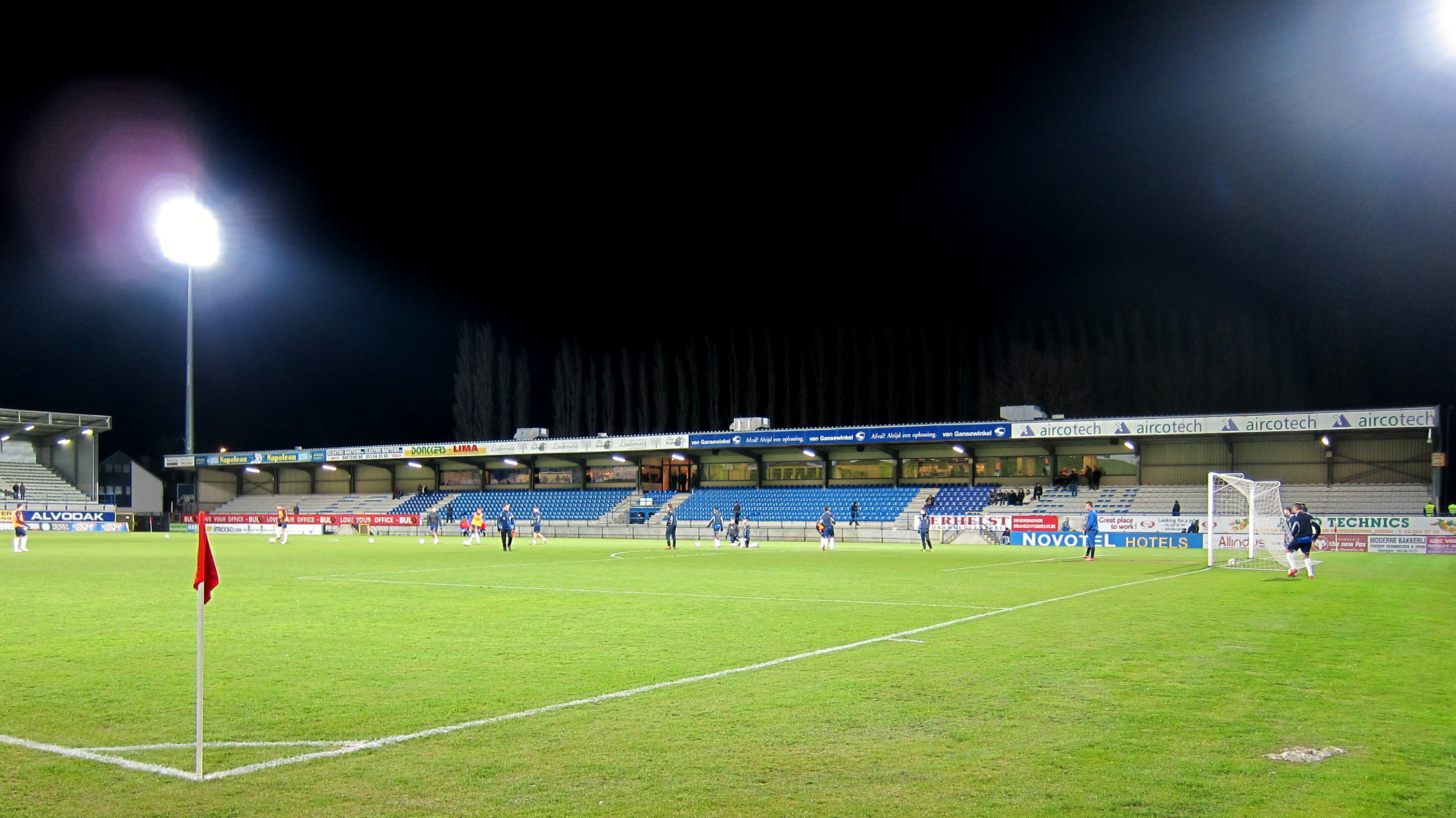
- Interactive map of Dender Football Complex
- Full name: Dender Football Complex
- Location: Denderleeuw, Belgium
- Coordinates: 50°53′01″N 4°04′16″E
- Operator: Dender EH
- Capacity: 6,429
- Surface: grass

Construction
- Built: 1997

The Dender Football Complex is a stadium in Denderleeuw, Belgium. It is mainly used for football and is the home stadium of Dender EH. Built in 1997, it has a capacity of 6,429. In 2008, Dender EH decided to build a new stadium, because the old one didn't adhere to top division requirements. Local architect Frank Leenknegt designed it. The stadium was initially known as the Florent Beeckmanstadion, renamed in 2011 to Van Roystadion and finally in 2022, it was renamed to its current name.
