= Frédéric Stilmant =

Belgian footballer

Frédéric Stilmant (born 1 May 1979) is a Belgian football player who plays as a midfielder for URS Centre in the Belgian Second Division.

== Career ==
Stilmant played for Oostende in the Belgian First Division during the 2004–05 season. He previously played for R.O.C. de Charleroi-Marchienne.
