= Joseph Oosting =

Dutch footballer and manager

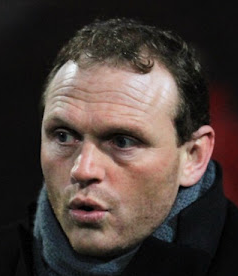
- Oosting in 2012

Personal information
- Full name: Joseph Oosting
- Date of birth: 29 January 1972 (age 54)
- Place of birth: Emmen, Netherlands
- Height: 1.80 m (5 ft 11 in)
- Position: Midfielder

Team information
- Current team: Go Ahead Eagles (head coach)

Senior career*
Years	Team	Apps	(Gls)
1988–1993	FC Emmen	92	(5)
1994–1999	BV Veendam	160	(32)
1999–2006	FC Emmen	139	(25)
Total		391	(62)

Managerial career
- 2008–2009: CVV Germanicus
- 2010–2011: WKE
- 2012–2013: ACV
- 2013–2014: WKE
- 2014–2016: Vitesse (U17)
- 2015–2016: Vitesse (U19)
- 2016: HHC Hardenberg
- 2017: Vitesse (U17 assistant)
- 2017–2021: Jong Vitesse
- 2018: Vitesse (assistant)
- 2019: Vitesse (caretaker)
- 2019–2021: Vitesse (assistant)
- 2021–2023: RKC Waalwijk
- 2023–2025: Twente
- 2025–2026: Antwerp
- 2026–: Go Ahead Eagles
- * Club domestic league appearances and goals

Joseph Oosting (born 29 January 1972) is a Dutch football manager and former player, who is currently head coach at Eredivisie club Go Ahead Eagles.

== Club career ==
He played professional football from 1988 to 2006 for BV Veendam and FC Emmen.

== Coaching career ==
In July 2021, Oosting was appointed as head coach of RKC Waalwijk. In April 2023, he agreed to sign a two-year contract as the head coach of Twente. In November 2025, he reached an agreement to join Belgian side Antwerp. He was dismissed by Royal Antwerp in May 2026 after the end of the season.

On 11 June 2026, Oosting was announced as the new head coach of Eredivisie club Go Ahead Eagles.

== Personal life ==
His son Thijs Oosting is also a professional footballer now and represented Netherlands internationally on junior levels.

== Managerial Statistics ==
As of 13 September 2025

Team	From	To	Record				
Team	From	To	G	W	D	L	Win %
WKE	September 2013	June 2014	5	3	0	2	60.00
Vitesse (U19)	February 2015	June 2016	40	22	5	13	55.00
HHC Hardenberg	July 2016	November 2016	11	0	4	7	0.00
Jong Vitesse	July 2017	June 2020	83	41	18	24	49.40
Vitesse (caretaker)	September 2019	September 2019	4	3	1	0	75.00
RKC Waalwijk	July 2021	June 2023	72	23	19	30	31.94
Twente	July 2023	September 2025	94	45	21	28	47.87
Career total			309	137	68	104	44.34
