= Sven Vandenbroeck =

Belgian football player and coach (born 1979)

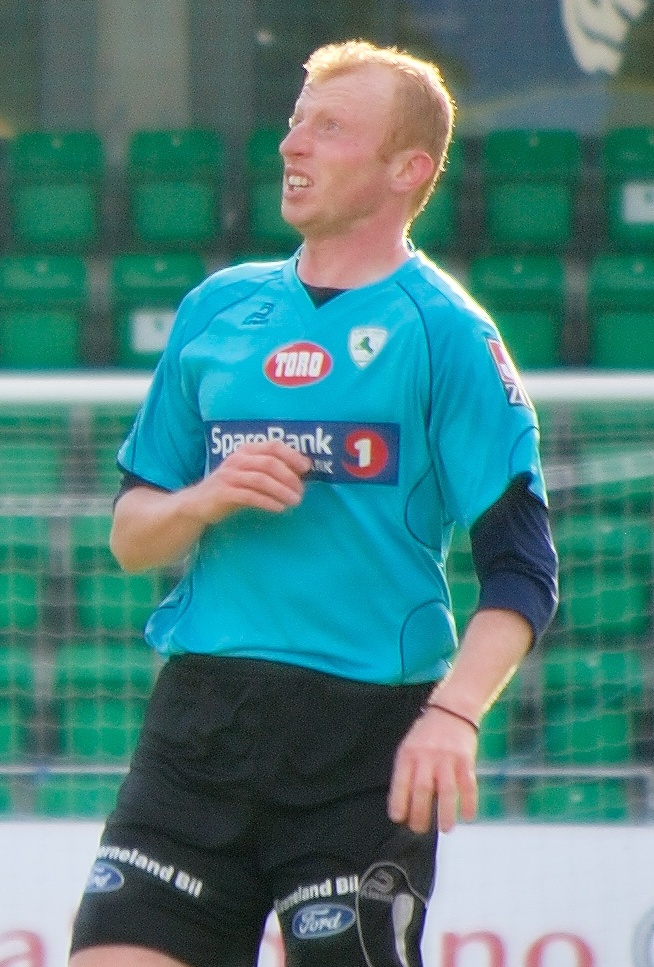
- Vandenbroeck with Løv-Ham in 2009

Personal information
- Full name: Sven Ludwig Vandenbroeck
- Date of birth: 22 September 1979 (age 47)
- Place of birth: Vilvoorde, Belgium
- Height: 1.81 m (5 ft 11 in)
- Position: Defensive midfielder

Team information
- Current team: La Louvière (head coach)

Senior career*
Years	Team	Apps	(Gls)
1996–2000	Mechelen		
2000–2004	Roda JC	55	(1)
2004–2005	De Graafschap	19	(0)
2005	Akratitos	1	(0)
2006–2007	Lierse	23	(0)
2007–2008	Visé		
2009	Løv-Ham	3	(0)

Managerial career
- 2014: Niki Volos (caretaker)
- 2016–2017: Cameroon
- 2018–2019: Zambia
- 2019–2021: Simba
- 2021–2022: AS FAR
- 2022: Abha
- 2023: Wydad AC
- 2023: CR Belouizdad
- 2024: Lierse
- 2024–2026: Zulte Waregem
- 2026–: La Louvière
- * Club domestic league appearances and goals

Sven Ludwig Vandenbroeck (born 22 September 1979) is a Belgian football coach and former player who is the head coach of Belgian Pro League club La Louvière.

== Playing career ==
Born in Vilvoorde, Vandenbroeck played as a defensive midfielder for Mechelen, Roda JC, De Graafschap, Akratitos, Lierse, Visé and Løv-Ham.

== Coaching career ==
Vandenbroeck served as manager of Niki Volos, and assistant manager to Oud-Heverlee Leuven and the Cameroonian national team. He was the assistant to Hugo Broos when Cameroon won the 2017 Africa Cup of Nations.

He was appointed manager of the Zambia national team in July 2018. He said he would be starting from "year zero". In February 2019 it was announced that the Football Association of Zambia would not renew Vandenbroeck's contract in March 2019, due to his failure to qualify for the 2019 Africa Cup of Nations. Vandenbroeck later claimed that he had already resigned but had agreed to stay on until the end of his contract. He was then placed on administrative leave. He said that his eight months in Zambia were "positive".

In December 2019 he was appointed manager of Tanzanian club Simba. He left the club on 7 January 2021, becoming manager of Moroccan club AS FAR two days later.

On 16 July 2022, Vandenbroeck was appointed as manager of Saudi Arabian club Abha. On 8 October 2022, Vandenbroeck was sacked after a 3–0 defeat to Al-Nassr.

In May 2023, he was appointed as manager of Moroccan club Wydad AC.

In July 2023 he was appointed as manager of Algerian club CR Belouizdad. On 8 October 2023, Vandenbroeck was sacked after a 3–2 defeat to USM Khenchela.

On 15 June 2024, Vandenbroeck was hired as head coach of Zulte Waregem in Challenger Pro League. He was sacked in March 2026 after a string of successive defeats, with Zulte Waregem just one point above the relegation group.

In November 2026 he became head coach of La Louvière.
