= Onur Cinel =

German football manager (born 1985)

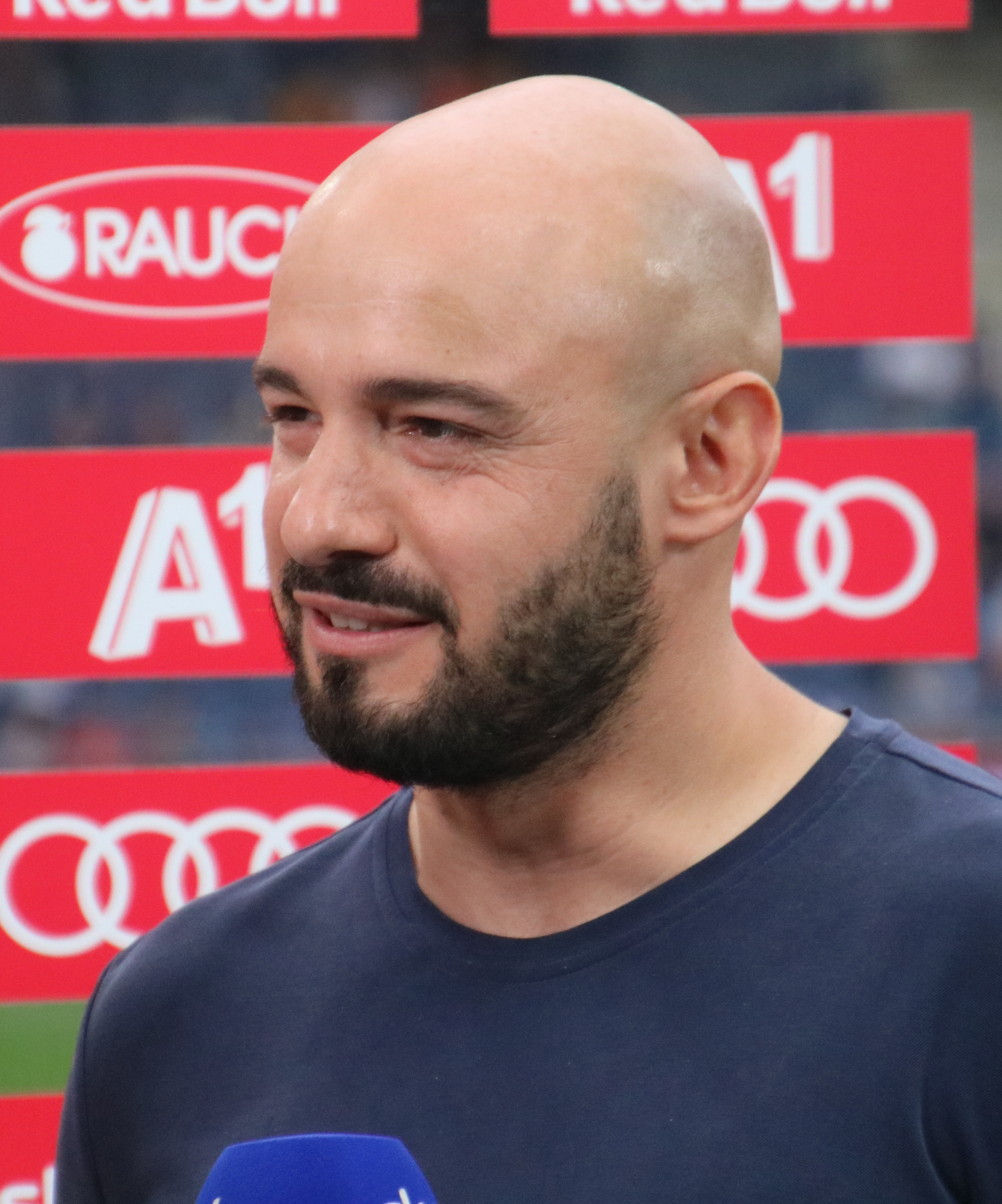
- Cinel in 2024

Personal information
- Date of birth: 17 June 1985 (age 41)
- Place of birth: Essen, Germany

Managerial career
- Years: Team
- 2009–2011: Essen (youth)
- 2012: TuS Heven 09
- 2012–2023: Schalke 04 (youth)
- 2022–: Austria (assistant)
- 2023–2024: FC Liefering
- 2024: Red Bull Salzburg (interim)
- 2024–2025: Red Bull Salzburg (assistant)
- 2025–2026: Cercle Brugge

Onur Cinel (Turkish: Çinel; born 17 June 1985) is a German football manager who is the assistant coach of the Austria national football team.

== Career ==
In 2009, Cinel was appointed as youth manager of the German side Essen.

Three years later, in 2012, he took over as manager of TuS Heven 09. Later that year, he joined Schalke 04 as a youth coach, initially assisting the U17 team before becoming head coach. He also held various roles at the club, including as assistant manager for Schalke's second team and reserve team coach.

In 2022, he was appointed assistant manager of the Austria national football team, a role he would continue to hold while also working with other teams.

In 2023, Cinel was appointed head coach of the Austrian side FC Liefering. The following year, he took over as head coach of Red Bull Salzburg. Subsequently, he transitioned into the role of assistant manager for the team.

Cinel was regarded as a promising German coaching talent, having completed internships at Chelsea and Ajax, as well as with Pep Guardiola at Manchester City.

In 2025 he was appointed Cercle Brugge manager. He was sacked on the 18th of March 2026, one game before the end of the regular league season, with Cercle penultimate in the ranking.

== Personal life ==
Cinel was born on 1 January 1989 in Essen, Germany. He is of Turkish descent through his parents.

== Managerial statistics ==
As of match played 15 March 2026

Managerial record by team and tenure
Team	From	To	Record				
Team	From	To	G	W	D	L	Win %
Essen	1 July 2009	30 June 2011	35	14	10	11	40.00
TuS Heven 09	10 March 2012	30 June 2012	1	1	0	0	100.00
FC Liefering	1 July 2023	15 April 2024	23	9	6	8	39.13
Red Bull Salzburg (caretaker)	15 April 2024	30 June 2024	6	3	1	2	50.00
Cercle Brugge	1 July 2025	18 March 2026	31	7	10	14	22.58
Total			96	34	27	35	35.42
