= Frédéric Taquin =

Belgian football manager (born 1975)

Personal information
- Date of birth: 2 June 1975 (age 51)
- Place of birth: Nivelles, Belgium

Managerial career
- Years: Team
- 2010–2013: Sartois
- 2013–2017: Villers
- 2017–2026: La Louvière

Frédéric Taquin (born 2 June 1975) is a Belgian football manager.

Taquin worked for Carglass while managing Sartois, earning promotion from the fourth to second division of the Belgian Provincial Leagues in Walloon Brabant, and retaining his role as manager of Villers following a merger in 2015. He was appointed at La Louvière following their re-establishment in 2017, and led them to four promotions in eight years from the national fifth tier to the Belgian Pro League, including three titles.

== Early and personal life ==
Taquin was born in Nivelles in Walloon Brabant. He has two sisters, including Caroline Taquin, mayor of Courcelles and former member of the Chamber of Representatives.

Taquin had been a youth player at Anderlecht and joined Olympic Charleroi at 16. A skiing accident ruled him out for 18 months with a knee injury, of which the effects lasted for decades.

Taquin worked as a flight attendant. He was an employee of Carglass for 19 years up to 2020, working in management in the Brussels area.

== Career ==
=== Sartois / Villers ===
Taquin began coaching at RC Sartois, a team in the fourth provincial division. He worked for 40 to 50 hours per week at Carglass while coaching two nights a week, studying coaching courses a further two nights, and leading his team at the weekend. In June 2013, the club finished in 4th place, their best position in their 50-year history; mergers of other clubs meant that they were promoted to the second provincial division. In April 2015, his club merged with Villers Matima to make RC Villers-la-Ville, with him in charge.

=== La Louvière ===
Taquin was appointed as manager of the re-established RAAL La Louvière in February 2017, being informed of the news while he watched a Bayern Munich match at the Allianz Arena. Starting in the fifth tier, he won promotion as champions in 2017–18. Following two seasons curtailed by the COVID-19 pandemic, a second promotion as champions of the fourth tier followed in 2021–22. The team returned to professional football by winning the third tier in 2023–24. On 10 March 2024, in a 1–0 win away to Royal Cappellen, he was in charge of the club for the 200th time. In 2024–25, the club were promoted from the Challenger Pro League as runners-up to SV Zulte Waregem, concluding a run of four promotions in eight years and three titles.

On 26 July 2025, in La Louvière's first Belgian Pro League game since 2006, Taquin lost 2–0 at home to Standard Liège. The team gained a first victory in the third game on 10 August, 1–0 at home to Royal Charleroi via an Etienne Camara own goal; their previous win on 3 December 2005 was against the same team. On 4 October, he marked his 250th game with a goalless draw against visitors Zulte Waregem. On 8 May 2026, with the club's place in the league secure, La Louvière announced that Taquin would leave. The following day, in his last match and the end of the season, his team won 4–1 at home to Cercle Brugge.
