= Vincent Euvrard =

Belgian footballer

Personal information
- Date of birth: 12 March 1982 (age 44)
- Place of birth: Veurne, Belgium
- Height: 1.84 m (6 ft 0 in)
- Position: Defender

Team information
- Current team: Standard Liège (manager)

Senior career*
Years	Team	Apps	(Gls)
2000–2002	Cercle Brugge	34	(3)
2002–2005	Genk	3	(0)
2003–2004	→ Heusden-Zolder (loan)	24	(1)
2005	Den Bosch	10	(0)
2005–2008	KVSK United	78	(5)
2008–2009	→ Sint-Truiden (loan)	34	(2)
2009–2013	Sint-Truiden	73	(3)
Total		256	(14)

Managerial career
- 2014–2015: Sporting Hasselt
- 2015–2016: ASV Geel
- 2016: Cercle Brugge
- 2017–2018: Cercle Brugge (assistant)
- 2018: Al-Batin (assistant)
- 2019–2020: OH Leuven
- 2020–2023: RWD Molenbeek
- 2023–2024: Zulte Waregem
- 2024–2025: Dender EH
- 2025–: Standard Liège
- * Club domestic league appearances and goals

Vincent Euvrard (born 12 March 1982) is a Belgian professional football manager and former player who is currently manager of Belgian Pro League club Standard Liège.

== Managerial career ==
Euvrard was officially announced as the new head coach of Challenger Pro League club, RWD Molenbeek. In 2022–23, Euvrard guided RWDM to the Belgian Pro League as champions of Challenger Pro League for the first time in history. One week before the start of the new season however, Euvrard was sacked.

== Honours ==
=== Manager ===
RWD Molenbeek

- Challenger Pro League: 2022–23
