= List of current Belgian Football League managers =

There are 32 association football teams in the top two tiers of Belgian football, all of whom have a manager, although the terms head coach and trainer are more commonly used for the position. The Belgian Pro League and Challenger Pro League are the only fully professional football leagues in Belgium. The Belgian Pro League consists of 18 clubs at the top of the Belgian football league system, while 15 clubs play in the second tier.

Some of these managers were appointed as caretaker managers prior to being given a permanent position; if so their caretaker appointment date is denoted in italics. Some managers listed have had more than one spell in charge at their current club, however, their time as manager is counted only from the date of their last appointment.

== Managers ==
As of 17 November 2026

Name	Nat.	Date of birth	Club	Division	Appointed	Time as manager	Source
Gaëtan Englebert	Belgium	11 June 1976	RFC Liège	Challenger Pro League	14 March 2022	4 years, 248 days	
Thomas Matton	Belgium	24 October 1985	Jong KAA Gent	Challenger Pro League	24 July 2024	2 years, 116 days	
Stijn Vreven	Belgium	18 July 1973	Lokeren	Challenger Pro League	11 February 2025	1 year, 279 days	
Frederik Vanderbiest	Belgium	10 October 1977	KV Mechelen	Belgian Pro League	4 March 2025 (Note: Vanderbiest was initially appointed caretaker manager at KV Mechelen following the sacking of Besnik Hasi, but has remained in charge since.)	1 year, 258 days	
Lee Johnson	England	7 June 1981	Lommel	Belgian Pro League	5 March 2025 (Note: Johnson was initially appointed caretaker manager at Lommel to replace caretaker Ryan Garry, but has remained in charge since.)	1 year, 257 days	
Issame Charaï	Belgium	11 May 1982	Westerlo	Belgian Pro League	17 June 2025	1 year, 153 days	
Mohamed Messoudi	Belgium	7 January 1984	Beerschot	Challenger Pro League	20 June 2025	1 year, 150 days	
Jo Christiaens	Belgium	17 April 1988	Hasselt	Challenger Pro League	8 August 2025	1 year, 101 days	
Vincent Euvrard	Belgium	12 March 1982	Standard Liège	Belgian Pro League	27 August 2025	1 year, 82 days	
David Hubert	Belgium	12 February 1988	Union SG	Belgian Pro League	13 October 2025	1 year, 35 days	
Yves Vanderhaeghe	Belgium	30 January 1970	Francs Borains	Challenger Pro League	12 November 2025	1 year, 5 days	
Ivan Leko	Croatia	7 February 1978	Club Brugge	Belgian Pro League	8 December 2025	344 days	
Rik De Mil	Belgium	15 September 1981	Gent	Belgian Pro League	10 December 2025	342 days	
Arnauld Mercier	France	4 June 1972	Seraing	Challenger Pro League	19 February 2026	271 days	
Mario Kohnen	Belgium	7 October 1986	Charleroi	Belgian Pro League	7 April 2026 (Note: Kohnen was initially appointed caretaker manager at Charleroi on 7 April 2026 following the sacking of Hans Cornelis, but was officially appointed on 17 June 2026.)	224 days	
Marvin Compper	Germany	14 June 1985	Antwerp	Belgian Pro League	3 August 2026	106 days	
Felice Mazzù	Belgium	12 March 1966	Eupen	Challenger Pro League	22 June 2026	148 days	
Vítor Bruno	Portugal	2 December 1982	Anderlecht	Belgian Pro League	23 June 2026	147 days	
Piet Cremers	Netherlands	27 October 1994	Club NXT	Challenger Pro League	3 July 2026	137 days	
Jonathan Alves	Portugal	2 December 1982	Dender EH	Challenger Pro League	20 August 2026	89 days	
Karim Mokeddem	France	24 November 1973	RSCA Futures	Challenger Pro League	29 September 2026	49 days	
Emilio Ferrera	Belgium	19 June 1967	Patro Eisden Maasmechelen	Challenger Pro League	2 October 2026	46 days	
Daniel Beichler	Austria	13 October 1988	Kortrijk	Belgian Pro League	7 October 2026	41 days	
Pedro Caixinha	Portugal	15 November 1970	Cercle Brugge	Belgian Pro League	2 November 2026	15 days	
Pedro Resende	Portugal	19 April 1977	Virton	Challenger Pro League	2 November 2026	15 days	
Jonas De Roeck	Belgium	20 December 1979	Sint-Truiden	Belgian Pro League	6 November 2026	11 days	
position vacant (Note: Position vacant since the sacking of Arno Van Den Abbeel on 10 November 2026.)			Lierse	Challenger Pro League	10 November 2026	7 days	
position vacant (Note: Position vacant since the sacking of Tim Bakens on 11 November 2026.)			Beveren	Belgian Pro League	11 November 2026	6 days	
Sven Vandenbroeck	Belgium	22 September 1979	La Louvière	Belgian Pro League	12 November 2026	5 days	
position vacant (Note: Position vacant since the risngation of Michael Beale on 12 November 2026.)			Zulte Waregem	Belgian Pro League	12 November 2026	5 days	
Timmy Simons	Belgium	11 December 1976	Genk	Belgian Pro League	17 November 2026	0 days	
position vacant (Note: Position vacant since Timmy Simons was signed by Genk on 17 November 2026.)			OH Leuven	Belgian Pro League	17 November 2026	0 days	
position vacant (Note: Position vacant since Igor de Camargo was signed by Genk as assistant manager on 17 November 2026.)			Jong Genk	Challenger Pro League	17 November 2026	0 days	
