= Etterbeek =

Municipality of the Brussels-Capital Region, Belgium

- Municipality
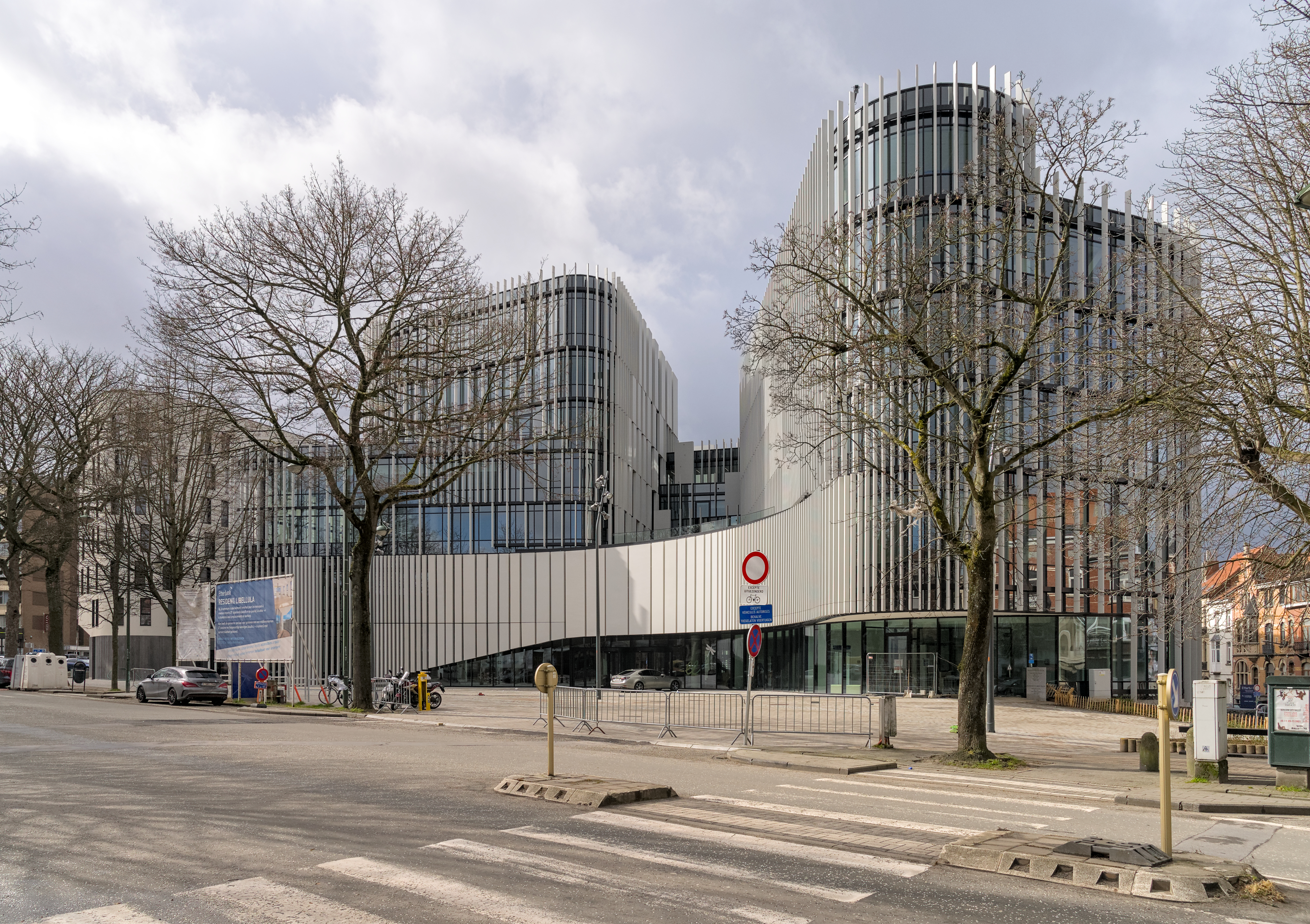
- Etterbeek's Municipal Hall

- Flag Coat of arms

- Etterbeek municipality in the Brussels-Capital Region
- Interactive map of Etterbeek
- Location in Belgium
- Coordinates: 50°50′N 04°23′E
- Country: Belgium
- Community: Flemish Community; French Community
- Region: Brussels-Capital
- Arrondissement: Brussels-Capital

Government
  - Mayor: Vincent De Wolf (MR)
  - Governing party: LB-Ecolo-PS

Area
  - Total: 3.17 km^{2} (1.22 sq mi)

Population (2020-01-01)
  - Total: 48,473
  - Density: 15,300/km^{2} (39,600/sq mi)
- Postal codes: 1040
- NIS code: 21005
- Area codes: 02
- Website: www.etterbeek.be/fr (in French) www.etterbeek.be/nl (in Dutch)

Etterbeek (French: [etœʁbek, -bɛk]; Dutch: [ˈɛtərˌbeːk]) is one of the 19 municipalities of the Brussels-Capital Region, Belgium. Located in the eastern part of the region, it is bordered by the municipalities of Auderghem, the City of Brussels, Ixelles, Schaerbeek, Woluwe-Saint-Lambert and Woluwe-Saint-Pierre. Like all municipalities in Brussels, it is officially bilingual (French–Dutch).

== History ==
=== Origins and etymology ===
According to legend, Saint Gertrude of Nivelles, daughter of Pippin of Landen, founded a chapel there in the 8th century. A document by Otto I, Holy Roman Emperor, dated 966, mentions the church of Iatrebache. The name Ietrebecca—possibly from the Celtic root ett meaning "rapid movement" and the Dutch word beek meaning "stream"—is found for the first time in a document dated 1127. The current spelling appears eleven years later in 1138, around which time a newer and larger church was built.

=== Middle Ages ===
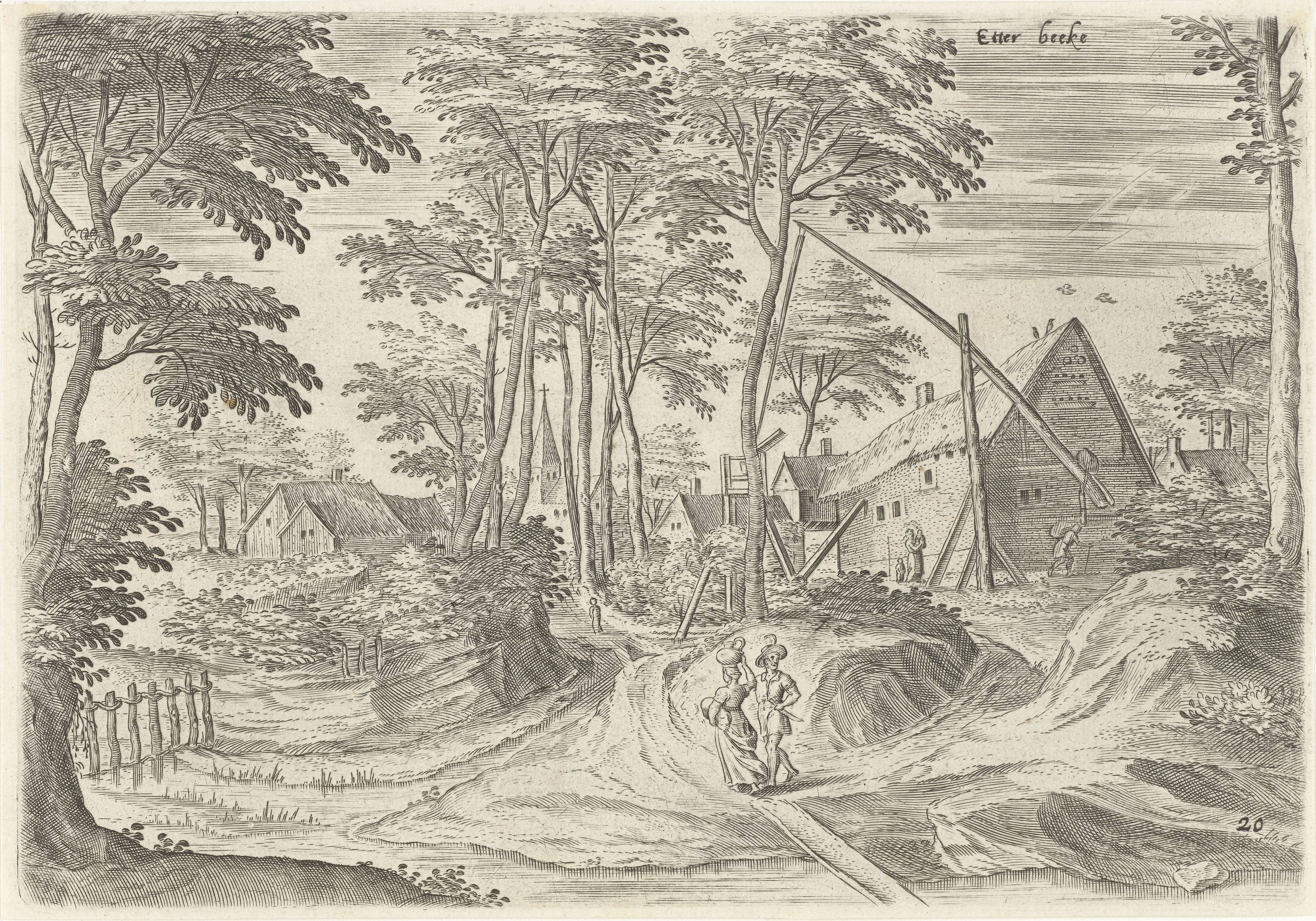
Etterbeek in the 16th century

In the Middle Ages, Etterbeek was a rural hamlet mostly independent of Brussels, aside from taxation rights on beer given to Brussels around 1300 by John II, Duke of Brabant. The following two centuries counted several grievous moments: in 1489, Albert III, Duke of Saxony, ravaged Etterbeek in his pursuit of the rebels who fought against Holy Roman Emperor Maximilian; in 1580, the village was destroyed again, this time by iconoclasts during the wars of religion. Peace returned under the reigns of the Archdukes Albert VII and Isabella.

=== Barony and municipality ===
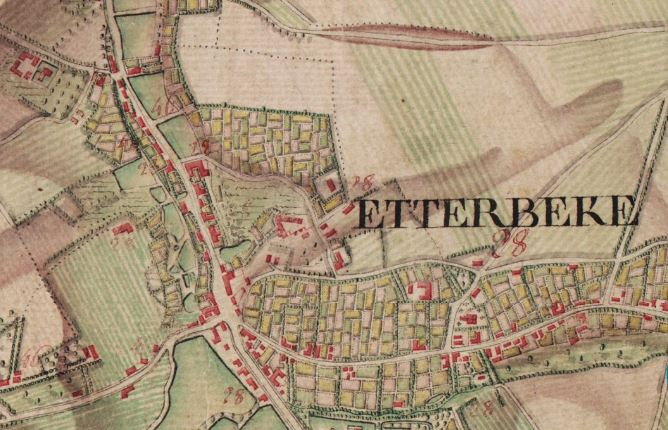
The village of Etterbeek (spelled Etterbeke) marked on the 18th-century Ferraris map

In 1673, Etterbeek gained its independence from neighbouring Sint-Genesius-Rode, when King Charles II of Spain promoted it into a barony. The first baron was Don Diego-Henriquez de Castro, general treasurer of the Spanish Netherlands armies. The Barony House was sold in 1767 and can still be seen today as Etterbeek's oldest building.

Under the French regime, Etterbeek was made into a commune, within the canton of Sint-Stevens-Woluwe. From then on, and especially after the Belgian Revolution of 1830 and the development of Brussels as a capital city, the population of Etterbeek grew quickly. In 1876, there were more than 10,000 inhabitants, in 1900 more than 20,000, and in 1910 more than 33,000. In the 1900s (decade), during the reign of King Leopold II, construction boomed and changed the town's character with the addition of the broad avenues and residential areas that exist today.

=== 21st century ===
In 2010, the municipal council approved the initial stages of a large-scale urban development project on the site of the Public Centre for Social Welfare (CPAS/OCMW), near the Avenue des Casernes/Kazernelaan. This project, called the Jardins de la Chasse in French or Tuinen van de Jacht in Dutch, consisted of the construction of a new administrative centre, including a modern Municipal Hall, a police station, new CPAS/OCMW headquarters, housing, shops, and a green area. Demolition of the former CPAS/OCMW building began in 2014, and building of houses started in 2016, with construction of the new Municipal Hall completed in 2021. The site of the former Municipal Hall may be used for further residential development in the future.

== Main sights ==
Etterbeek has a rich cultural and architectural heritage. Some of the main points of interest include:

- The Church of St. Anthony of Padua, a Catholic parish church designed in neo-Gothic style and built between 1905 and 1935, which has been listed as a protected monument since 2004.
- The Church of Our Lady of the Sacred Heart, located on the Rue de Tervaete/Tervaetestraat, a neo-Romanesque building completed in 1954.
- A third church—the Church of St. Gertrude—was demolished in 1993, as it was in danger of collapsing.
- The Cauchie House, a town house built in 1905 by the Art Nouveau architect, painter, and designer Paul Cauchie. Its facade is remarkable for its allegorical sgraffiti.
- Of a completely different character, the Barony House dates from 1680 and is the municipality's oldest surviving dwelling.
- The Fondation René Carcan, a foundation and museum in the engraver and sculptor René Carcan's old studio, was located in Etterbeek.
- The Chaussée de Wavre/Waversesteenweg has, since 27 September 2014, featured a series of large scale Le Chat drawings by the cartoonist Philippe Geluck, who was born and raised in this neighbourhood. The 24 drawings extend over a total length of 120 metres (390 ft).
- Etterbeek has a few green areas, including Jean-Félix Hap Garden. The better known Parc du Cinquantenaire/Jubelpark lies on the territory of both the City of Brussels and Etterbeek, and Leopold Park borders the municipality's territory.

The main university campus of the Vrije Universiteit Brussel (VUB) is called Campus Etterbeek, although it is geographically not within Etterbeek but in the adjacent Ixelles.

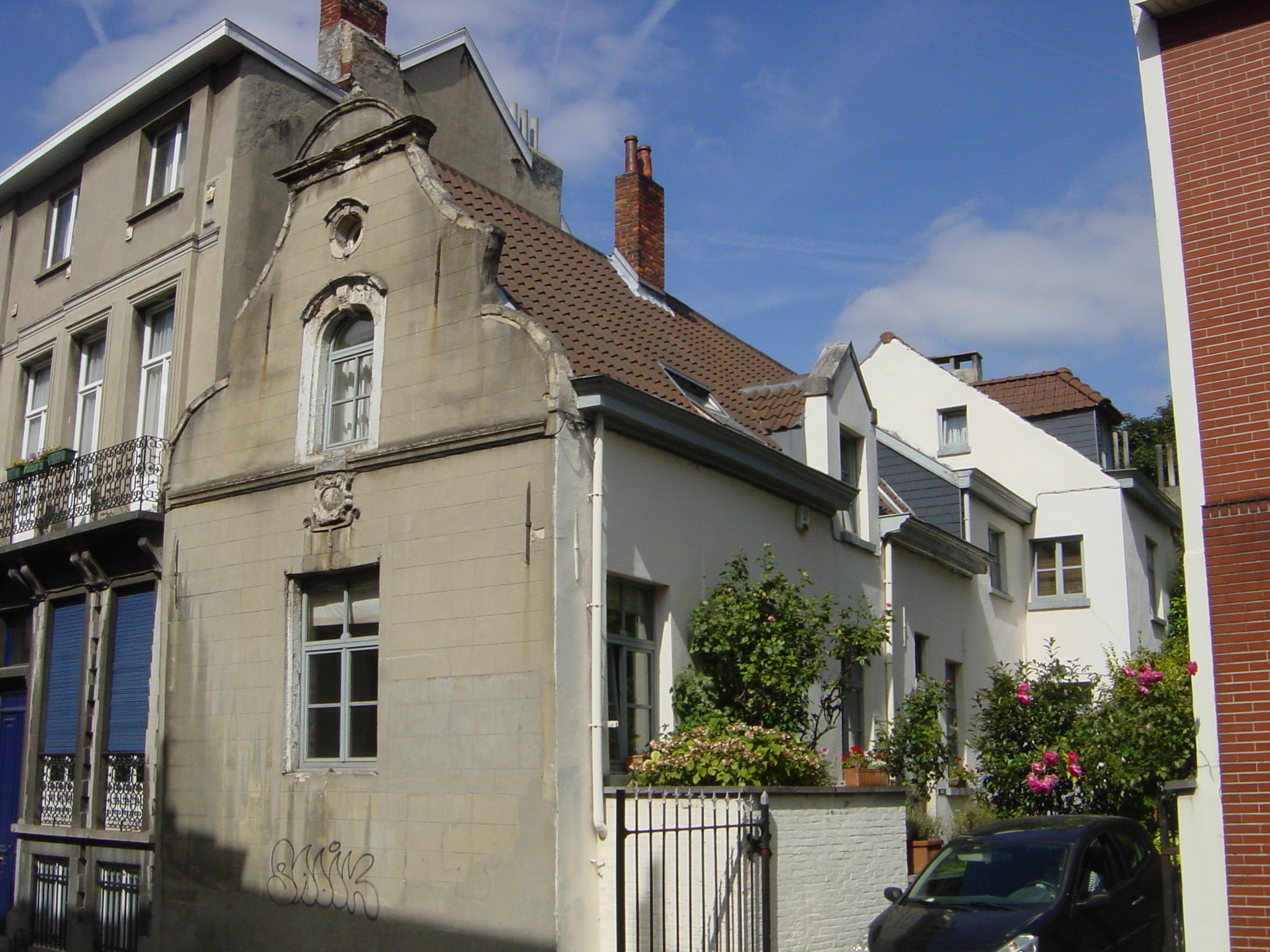
Barony House (1680)

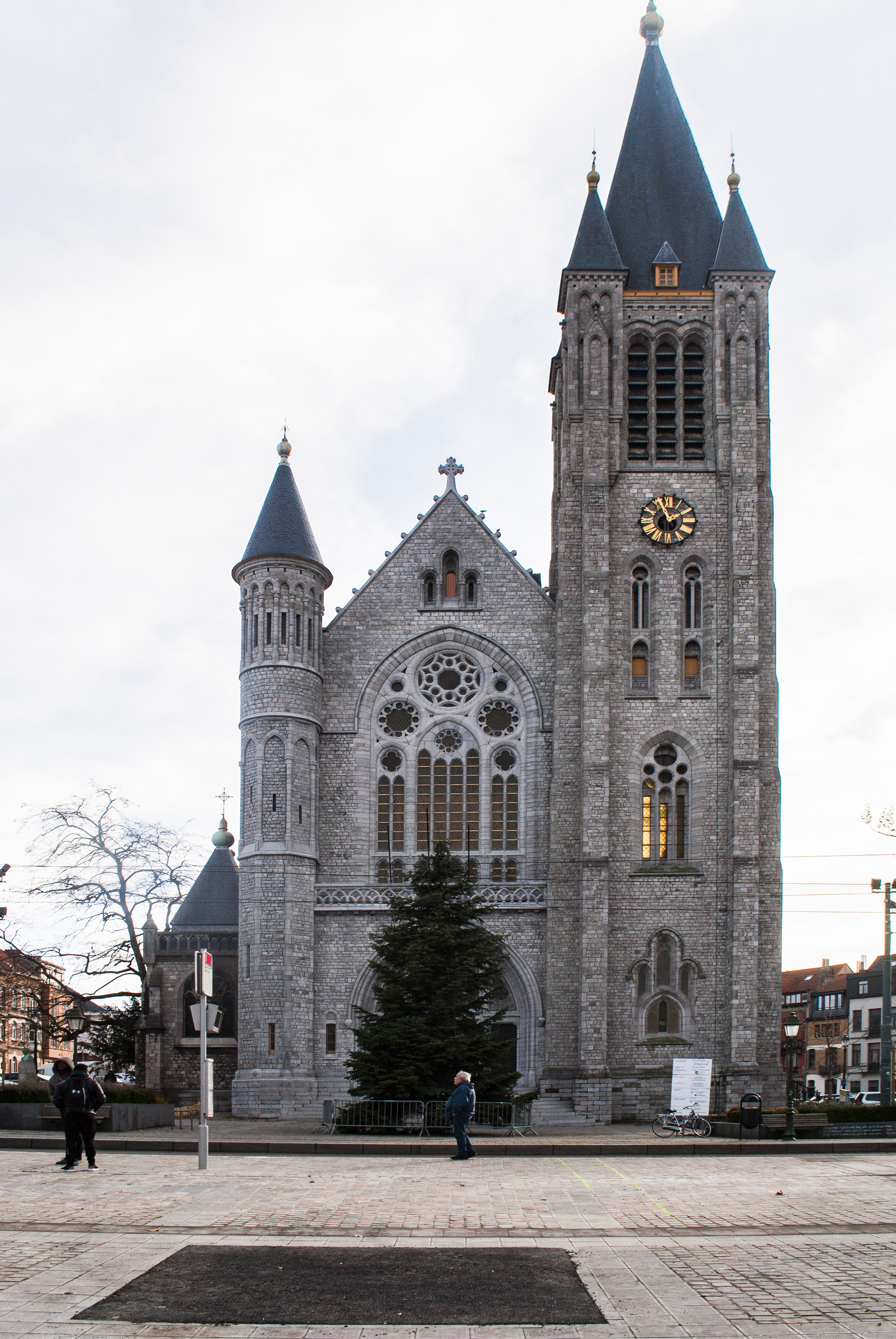
Church of St. Anthony of Padua

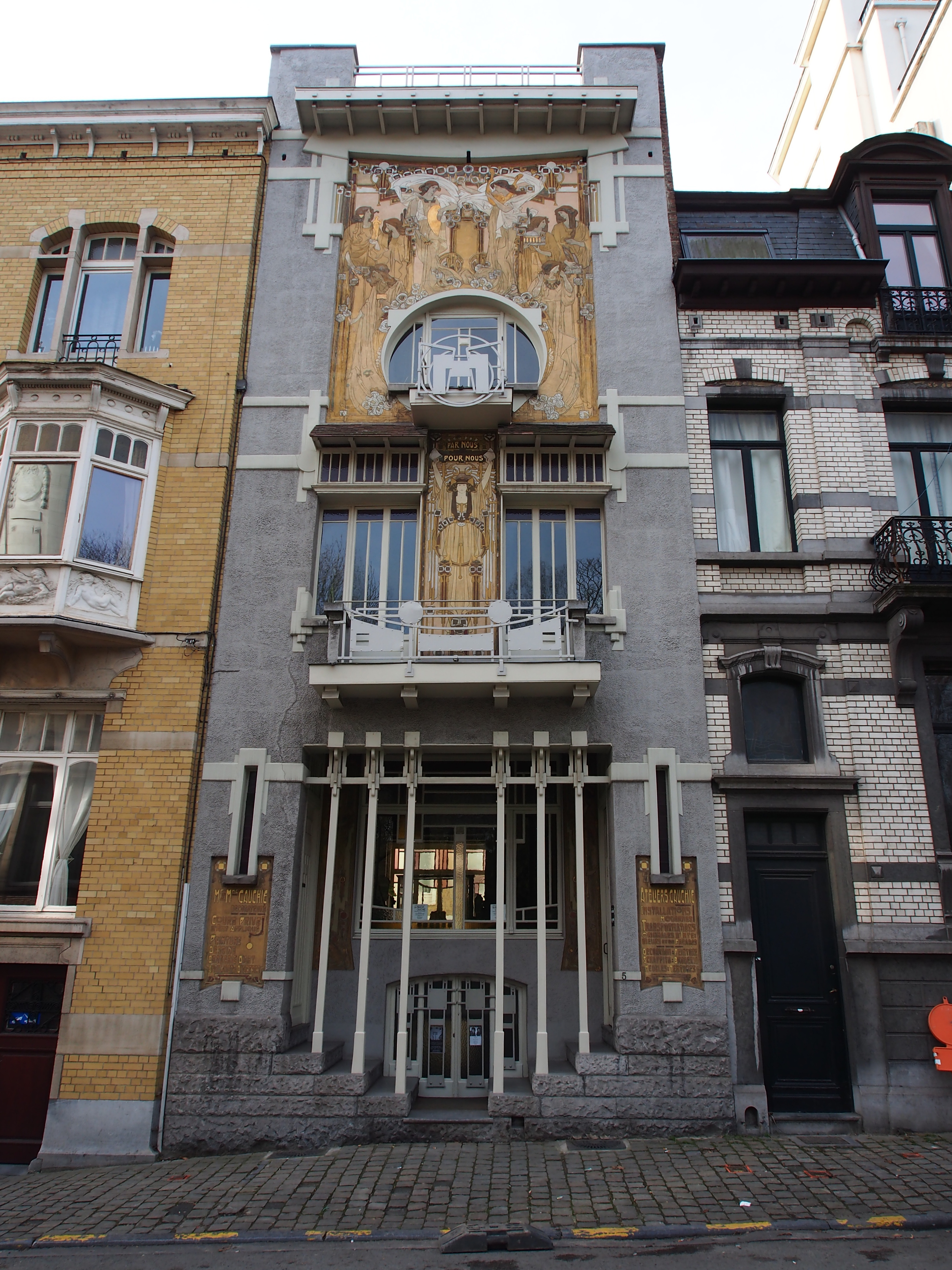
Cauchie House

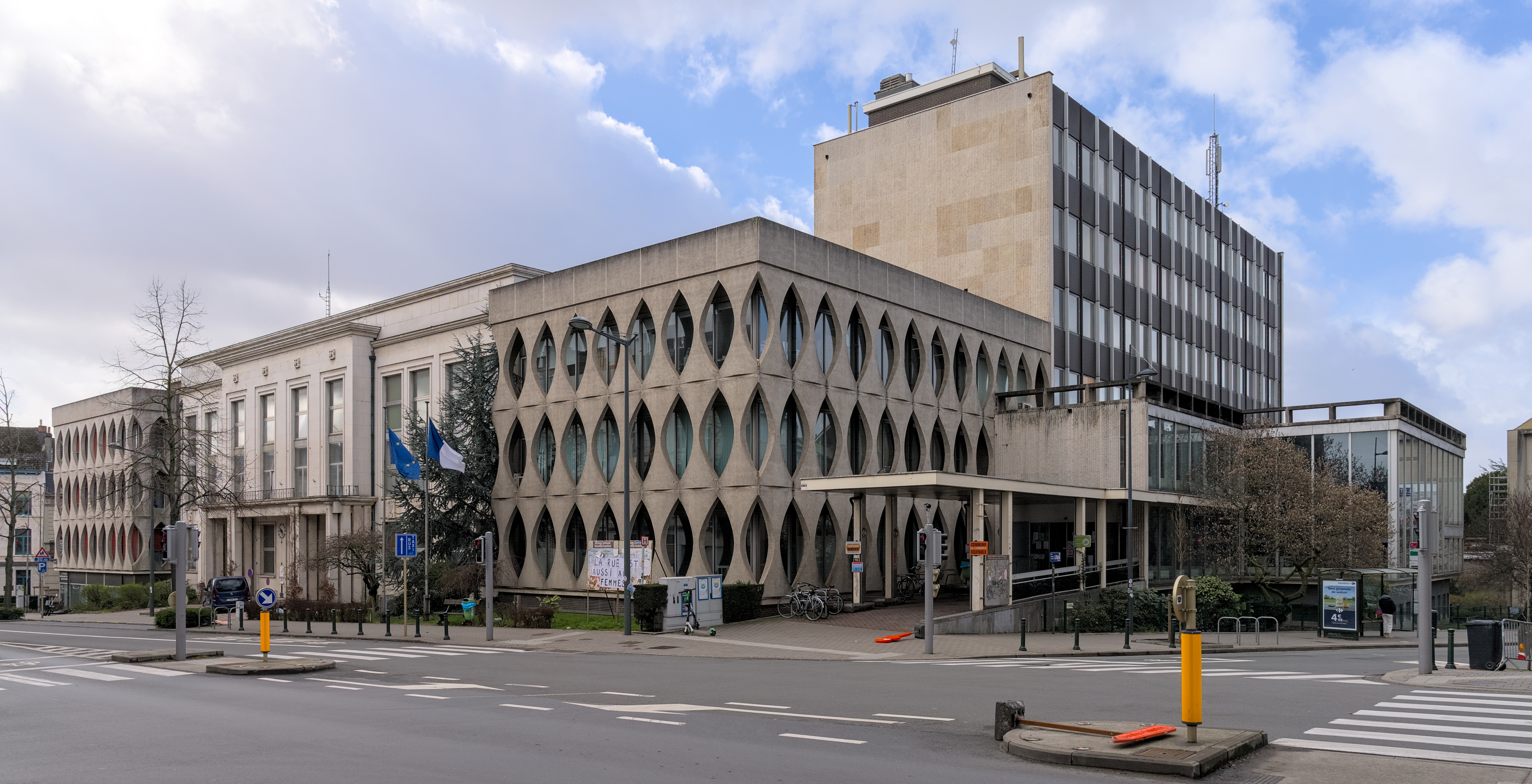
Former Municipal Hall

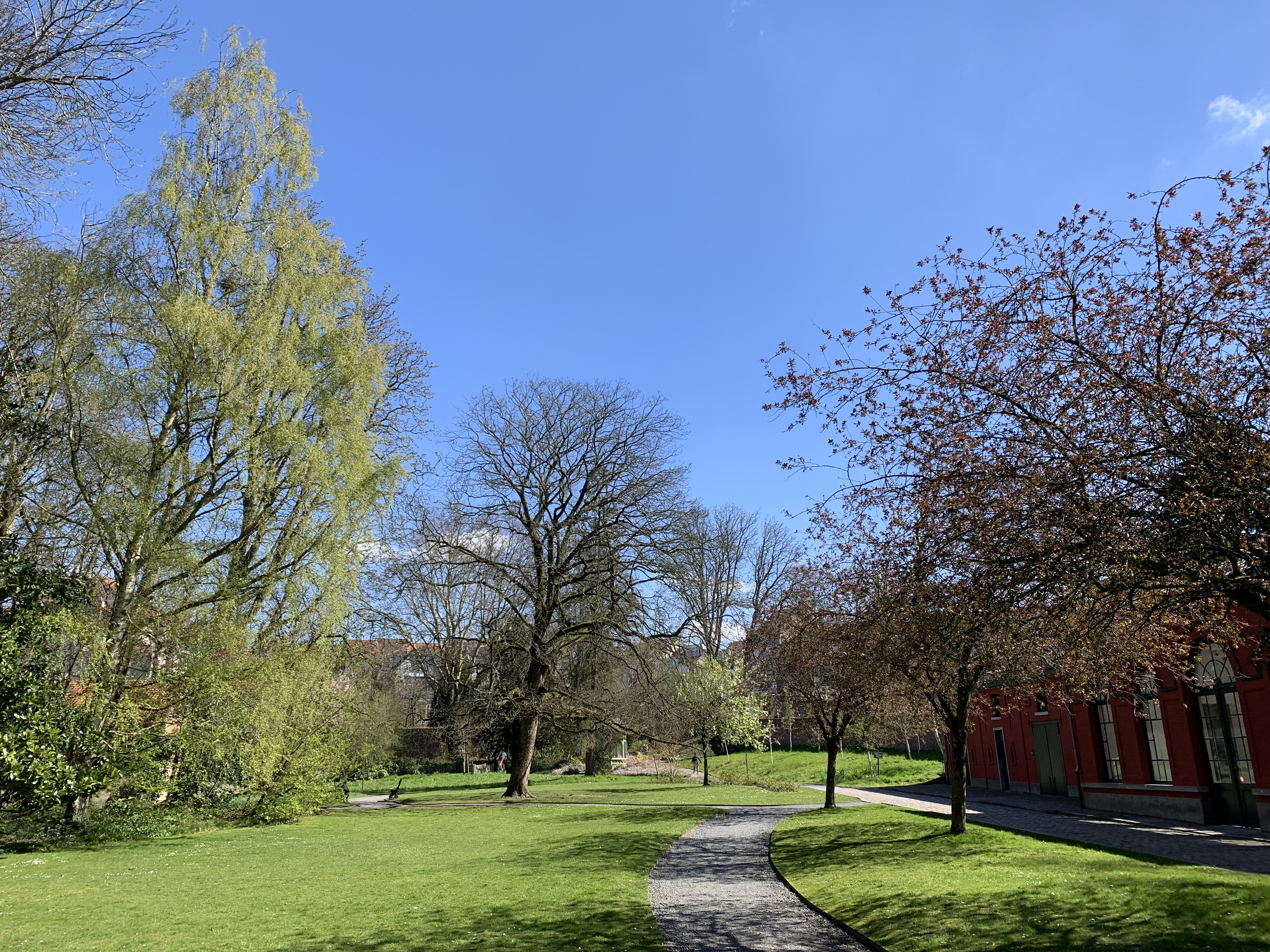
Jean-Félix Hap Garden

== Demographics ==
Etterbeek has a large immigrant population, with both the EU and non-European migrant communities outnumbering the native Belgians. Akin to neighbouring Ixelles and Schaerbeek, Etterbeek also has a large Muslim population, mainly of Moroccan origin.

Group of origin	Year	
Group of origin	2023	
Group of origin	Number	%
Belgians with Belgian background	11,169	22.54%
Belgians with foreign background	13,191	26.62%
Neighbouring country	1,695	3.42%
EU27 (excluding neighbouring country)	2,207	4.45%
Outside EU 27	9,289	18.74%
Non-Belgians	25,198	50.85%
Neighbouring country	6,233	12.58%
EU27 (excluding neighboring country)	11,734	23.68%
Outside EU 27	7,231	14.59%
Total	49,558	100%

== Transport ==
Etterbeek is served by Etterbeek railway station but, like the neighbouring campus of the Vrije Universiteit Brussel (VUB), it is also located in Ixelles. Etterbeek currently has one railway station (Merode) and three metro stations (Merode, Thieffry and Pétillon).

== Sports ==
- Etterbeek hosts two football clubs (R.R.C. Etterbeek and Armenia) playing in Belgian Provincial leagues at the Guy Thys Stadium, thus named after the famous Belgian manager since 2003. He led the Belgium national football team to fourth place at the 1986 FIFA World Cup.
- In the summer of 1996, the municipal swimming pool burnt down. It has now been rebuilt and is again open to the public.

== Events ==
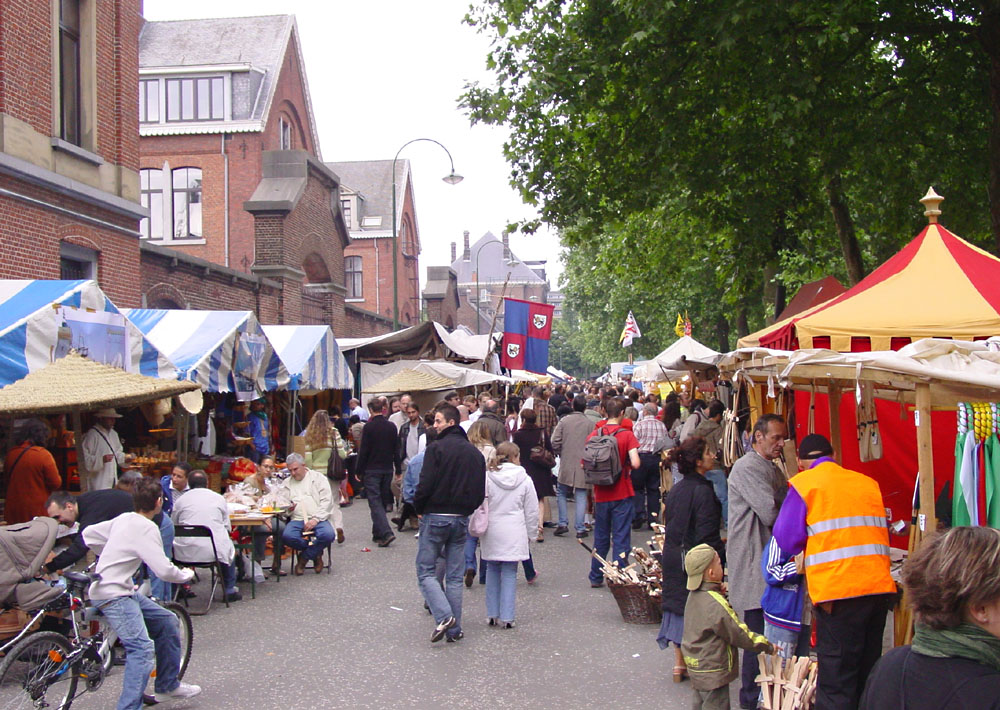
Etterbeek Medieval Market in 2007

Etterbeek hosts an annual medieval market. Previously held at the end of May on the Avenue du Deuxième Régiment de Lanciers/Tweede Lansiers Regimentelaan in the south of the municipality, in recent years, it has taken place at the Cinquantenaire.

== Notable inhabitants ==
Born in Etterbeek:

- Jérôme d'Ambrosio (born 1985), racing driver
- Jean Brachet (1909–1998), biochemist
- Misha Defonseca (Monique De Wael) (born 1937), writer of Misha: A Mémoire of the Holocaust Years
- Pierre Deligne (born 1944), Fields Medal-winning mathematician
- François Englert (1932–2026), Nobel Prize-winning physicist
- Giani Esposito (1930–1974), actor
- Lara Fabian (born 1970), singer-songwriter
- Annie Fargé (1934–2011), actress
- Marouane Fellaini (born 1987), football player
- Philippe Francq (born 1961), cartoonist
- André Franquin (1924–1997), cartoonist, creator of Gaston and Marsupilami
- Philippe Geluck (born 1954), cartoonist, creator of Le Chat
- Georges Grün (born 1962), football player
- Arthur Maurice Hocart (1883–1939), anthropologist
- Daniel Hulet (1942–2011), cartoonist
- René Kalisky (1936–1981), playwright, novelist, essayist, journalist, and historian
- Michel Ledent, also known as Midam (born 1963), cartoonist
- Roland Lethem (born 1942), filmmaker and writer
- Charles Lambert Manneback (1894–1975), physicist, mining engineer, and mathematician
- Alexandre de Merode (1934–2002), member of the International Olympic Committee (IOC)
- Constantin Meunier (1831–1905), painter and sculptor
- Eliane Morissens (1927–2006), LGBT activist known for protests on employment discrimination
- Fabrice Mvemba (born 1980), football player
- Amélie Nothomb (born 1966), writer
- Charles Picqué (born 1948), politician, freemason, and mayor of Saint-Gilles
- Godelieve Quisthoudt-Rowohl (born 1947), German politician
- Wolfgang Reip (born 1986), racing driver
- Georges Remi, also known as Hergé (1907–1983), cartoonist, creator of The Adventures of Tintin
- Andre Sapir (born 1950), economist
- Stromae (Paul Van Haver) (born 1985), singer-songwriter, rapper, and producer
- Herman Van Rompuy (born 1947), politician, Prime Minister, and first permanent President of the European Council
- Corneille Wellens (1905–1994), field hockey player
- Hiraç Yagan (born 1989), Belgian-born football player who competed internationally for Armenia

Lived part of their life in Etterbeek:

- Jean Absil (1893–1974), composer and organist
- Jean-Baptiste Baronian (born 1942), Belgian-Armenian writer
- René Carcan (1925–1993), engraver and sculptor
- Adrien de Gerlache (1866–1934), officer of the Belgian Navy and leader of the Belgian Antarctic Expedition
- Luigi Di Maio (born 1986), Italian Minister of Foreign Affairs, EU Special Envoy to Arab Gulf States
- W.F. Hermans (1921–1995), Dutch writer
- Edgar Pierre Jacobs (1904–1987), cartoonist, creator of Blake and Mortimer
- Gaston Salmon (1878–1917), épée fencer, Olympic champion

Buried in Etterbeek:

- Moise Tshombe (1919–1969), Congolese politician

== International relations ==
=== Twin towns and sister cities ===
Etterbeek is twinned with:

- Fontenay-sous-Bois, France
- Forte dei Marmi, Italy
- Beauport, Quebec, Canada
- Essaouira, Morocco
