= Godelieve Quisthoudt-Rowohl =

German politician (born 1947)

Godelieve Quisthoudt-Rowohl MEP
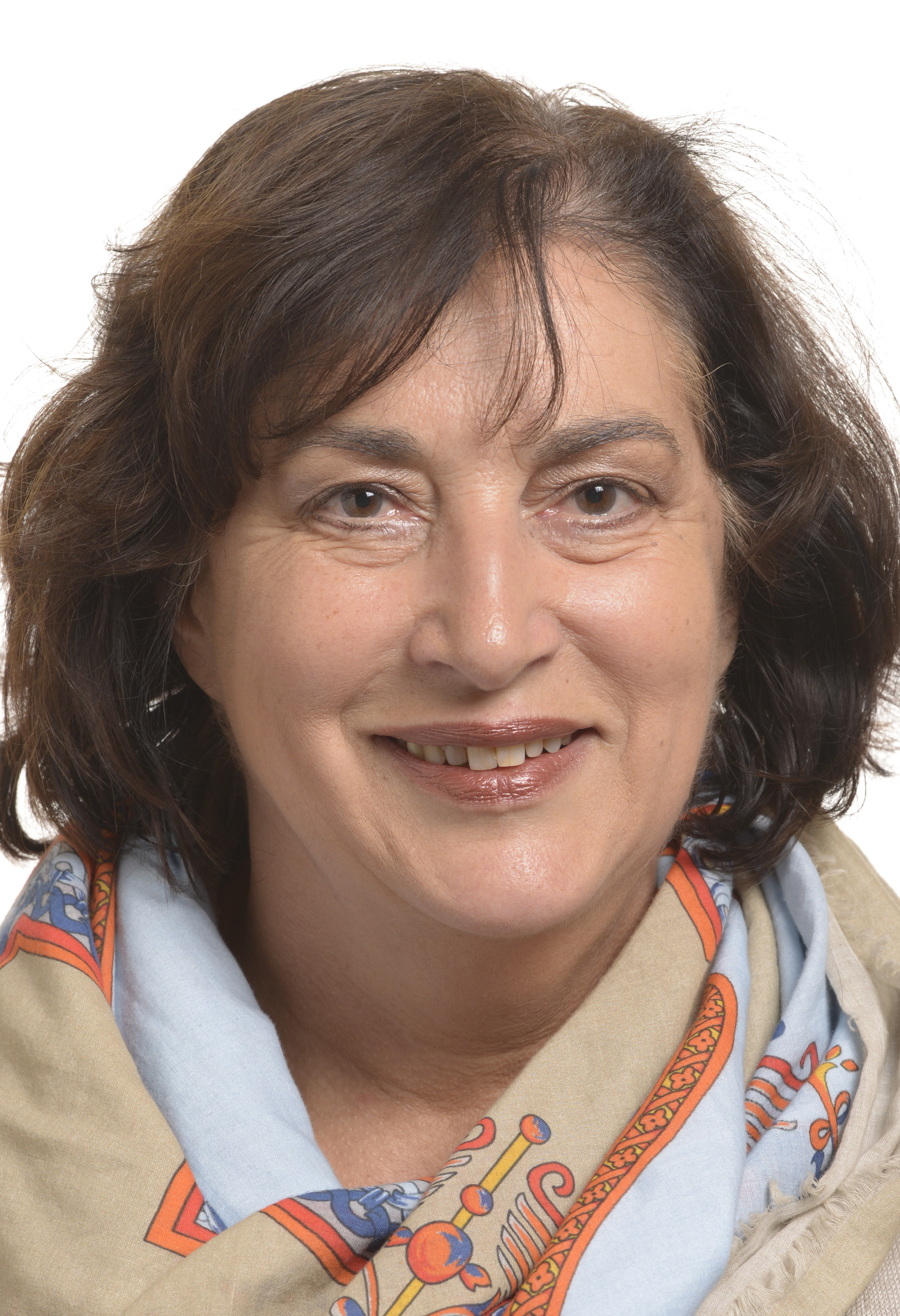

Member of the European Parliament
- In office 1 July 1989 – 1 July 2019
- Constituency: Germany

Personal details
- Born: Godelieve Quisthoudt; 18 June 1947 (age 79) Etterbeek, Brussels, Belgium
- Party: German; Christian Democratic Union; EU; European People's Party
- Children: 4
- Education: Katholieke Universiteit Leuven
- Website: www.quisthoudt-rowohl.de

Godelieve Quisthoudt-Rowohl is a German politician who served as a Member of the European Parliament from 1989 until 2019. She is a member of the Christian Democratic Union in Lower Saxony, which is a part of the European People's Party. She most recently served as the European People's Party's coordinator of the International Trade Committee (INTA), chairwoman of the UK Monitoring Group of INTA, vice-coordinator of the Committee on Human Rights (DROI) and vice-chairwoman of the Delegation for relations with Canada.

== Education and career ==
Quisthoudt-Rowohl studied chemistry at University of Leuven. After graduating, she did a PhD at the Max Planck Institute for Biophysical Chemistry in Göttingen from 1972 to 1973.

From 1974 to 1978 Quisthoudt-Rowohl continued researching at the Hannover Medical School. From 1979 to 1989 she served as Akademische Rätin of the University of Hildesheim. There she also worked as an academic employee at the institute for applied glottology and later became an academic council at the institute for applied glottology. From 2002, she was teaching at its Institute of Social Sciences. On 6 March 2009, she became a professor at the department of education and social sciences. She gave guest lectures at the University of Kaliningrad, at the European Business School and at Harvard University.

== Political career ==
=== Career in national politics ===
In 1990 Quisthoudt-Rowohl was a CDU board member in Lower Saxony. From 1994 to 2012 she was national board member for the CDU. She is counted as one of the principal supporters of Angela Merkel's bid for Chancellorship in 2004.

From 1990 to 1996 Quisthoudt-Rowohl was a national board member of the Frauen Union for the CDU. She was assistant member of the European committee of the German Bundestag. From 2005 to 2009 she was the leader of the city association CDU in Hildesheim. From 1990 to 1996 she served on the national board of the Frauen Union.

=== Member of the European Parliament, 1989–2019 ===
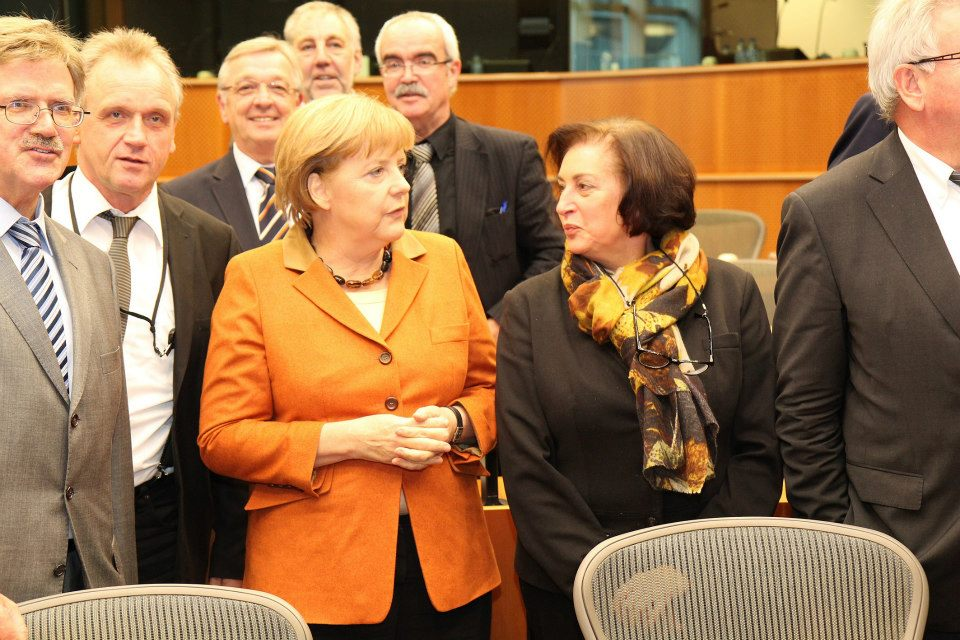
Quisthoudt-Rowohl with Angela Merkel

From 1989 Quisthoudt-Rowohl was a member of the European Parliament where she was one of the senior deputies for the CDU in the European Parliament with Elmar Brok and Karl-Heinz Florenz. She was a member of the executive board (Quaestor) from 1997 to 2007 and was a member of the board of the EPP.

As member of the Committee on International Trade, she advocated European car manufacturers against dumping prices of aluminium rims by Chinese manufacturers. At her request, the committee decided to criticize Turkey urgently because Turkey still does not allow Cyprus to export goods to Turkey. Further, Turkey should ratify the Ankara Protocol as soon as possible. Finally she urged Turkey to enforce copyrights effectively and so to stop brand piracy. Quisthoudt-Rowohl holds the European ban on incandescent lamps for patronizing and undemocratic, because the parliament and the public were not involved. Ms Quisthoudt-Rowohl was also involved in the ceilings for the mobile phone fees in the EU.

She wants to strengthen small and medium enterprises (SMEs) by increasing participation in international trade and by an intensification of relations to the USA. She was involved in a new energy agreement between Russia and the EU.

Quisthoudt-Rowohl was formally a member of the Committee on Development. There, she brought European student exchanges and projects to promote democracy in China and India on the way (since 2010). In 1999 she ensured that the Commission gave higher priority to children's rights. Quisthoudt-Rowohl works on the implementation of the Gender-Mainstreaming, in particular she speaks up for boys and young men to end their current discrimination. In 2003 she suggested a review of the use of EU funds for the Palestinian Authority, to ensure that the money is not wasted for corruption or funding of terrorist groups.

From 1994 to 1999, Quisthoudt-Rowohl was Deputy Chairman of the Committee on Energy, Research and Technology. 2005 she initiated the first talks between European institutes for oceanography and the European Parliament to discuss the rapidly advancing climate change, global sea level rise, marine resources, the increasing threat and damage from tsunamis, earthquakes and extreme weather events and the continuing destruction of the marine environment in order to discuss sustainable use and work on a consensus on priorities for future research.

In June 2018, Quisthoudt-Rowohl announced that she would not stand in the 2019 European elections but instead resign from active politics by the end of the parliamentary term.

=== Committee assignments and Delegations ===
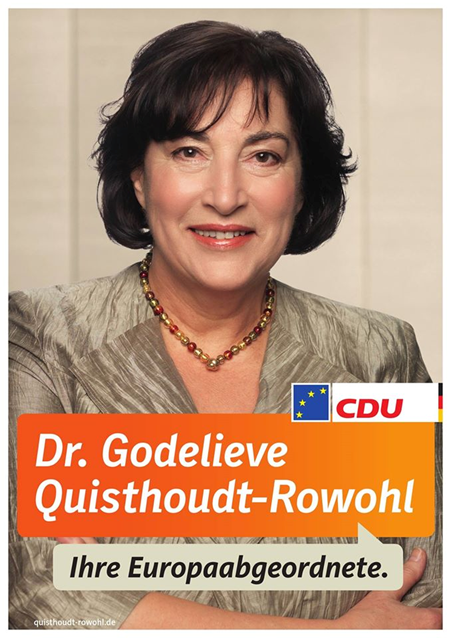
MEP Quisthoudt-Rowohl's Election Poster

Committees

1989-1991 Committee on Industry, Research and Energy (Member)

1991-1999 Committee on Industry, Research and Energy (Vice-chairwoman and coordinator)

1989-1999 Committee for Commerce and Currency (Deputy member)

2004-2007 Committee on Development (Deputy member)

2004-today Committee on International Trade (Member)

2007-2009 Committee on International Trade (Vice-chairwoman)

2009-2014 Committee on Foreign Affairs (Member)

2009-2014 Subcommittee on Human Rights (Deputy member)

Today

Committee on International Trade (Member and coordinator)

Committee on Foreign Affairs (Deputy member)

Subcommittee on Human Rights (Member and vice-coordinator)

Delegations

2009-2014

Delegation for relations with the United States (Deputy member)

Delegation for the Euro-Latin American Parliamentary Assembly (Member)

Delegation for relations with the countries of Andean community (Member)

Delegation for relations with the NATO Parliamentary Assembly (Member)

2012-2014

Surveillance group for trade relations between Australia and New Zealand (chairwoman)

Today

Delegation for relations with Canada (First vice-chairwoman)

Delegation for relations with India (Deputy member)

== Political positions ==
In 2011 Quisthoudt-Rowohl proposed changes to the Parliament's international trade committees (INTA) guidelines for the rights of foreign investors under future EU trade deals that were said to be in line with industry demands.

== Recognition ==
Transparency International awarded Quisthoudt-Rowohl in line of the Integrity Watch Program with best mark of 0 at the External Activity Indicator. Being present at 85% of the plenary sittings she is one of the front-runners in the EPP group.

== Personal life ==
Quisthoudt-Rowohl is married and has four adult children. She lives in Hildesheim in Lower-Saxony. Quisthoudt-Rowohl is chairman of the advisory board of the Hildesheim Episcopal Foundation "Gemeinsam für das Leben" (German: Together for life). She is decorated with the Order of Merit of the Federal Republic of Germany. Quisthoudt-Rowohl is a native Dutch and French Speaker as well as completely fluent in German, she can also speak English and Italian.

== Academic literature ==
- Godelieve Quisthoudt-Rowohl; Benjamin Fairbrother: Europäische Handelspolitik: von Rom bis Lissabon. Berlin : Konrad-Adenauer-Stiftung, 2010, ISBN 978-3-941904-28-6
- Godelieve Quisthoudt-Rowohl: Bericht über die Wirtschafts- und Handelsbeziehungen zwischen der EU und Russland In: Berichte des Europäischen Parlaments. Europäisches Parlament, 2007 (Deutsch und Englisch)
- Godelieve Quisthoudt-Rowohl: Politik für ein innovatives Europa. In: Günter Rinsche, Ingo Friedrich: Weichenstellung für das 21. Jahrhundert: Erfordernisse und Perspektiven der europäischen Integration. Böhlau, 1998, ISBN 3-412-14297-2, ISBN 978-3-412-14297-1
- Godelieve Quisthoudt-Rowohl: Europäische Forschungspolitik. In: Günter Rinsche, Ingo Friedrich: Europa als Auftrag: die Politik deutscher Christdemokraten im Europäischen Parlament 1957-1997 : von den Römischen Verträgen zur politischen Union. Böhlau, 1997, ISBN 3-412-00897-4, ISBN 978-3-412-00897-0, p. 171 ff.
- Godelieve Quisthoudt-Rowohl; Ingo Beckedarf: Europäische Forschungspolitik. In: Europa zwischen Alltag und Vision: neun Beiträge von Abgeordneten des Europäischen Parlaments und ein Szenario aus dem dritten Jahrtausend. Bloch, 1996, ISBN 3-929686-04-X, ISBN 978-3-929686-04-3, p. 169-184
- Godelieve Quisthoudt-Rowohl: Bericht zur Mitteilung der Kommission über die Perspektiven für die wissenschaftlich-technische Zusammenarbeit mit den Neuen Unabhängigen Staaten. Europäisches Parlament, 1995
- Godelieve Quisthoudt-Rowohl: Spezifisches Programm für Forschung, technologische Entwicklung und Demonstration im Bereich fortgeschrittener Kommunikationstechnologien und -dienste. Europäisches Parlament, 1994
- Godelieve Quisthoudt-Rowohl: Spezifisches Programm für Forschung, technologische Entwicklung und Demonstration im Bereich fortgeschrittener Kommunikationstechnologien und -dienste. Europäisches Parlament, 1994
- Godelieve Quisthoudt-Rowohl: Bericht: über den Vorschlag der Kommission für einen Beschluß des Rates über die Bereitstellung zusätzlicher Mittel für das Dritte Gemeinschaftliche Rahmenprogramm im Bereich der Forschung und technologischen Entwicklung. Europäisches Parlament, 1992
- Godelieve Quisthoudt-Rowohl: Der Umgang mit Briten und anderen exoten. Erfahrungen aus dem Europa-Parlament. In: Jürgen Beneke: Kultur, Mentalität, Nationale Identität. Bonn, Dümmler 1992, ISBN 3-427-63111-7, p. 7–13
- Godelieve Quisthoudt-Rowohl: Empfehlung des Ausschusses für Energie, Forschung und Technologie betreffend den Gemeinsamen Standpunkt des Rates im Hinblick auf die Annahme einer Entscheidung über die Verbreitung und Nutzung der Kenntnisse aus den spezifischen Programmen der Gemeinschaft für Forschung und technologische Entwicklung. Europäisches Parlament, 1992
- Godelieve Quisthoudt-Rowohl: Bericht des Ausschusses für Energie, Forschung und Technologie über den Vorschlag der Kommission für eine Entscheidung des Rates über die Verbreitung und Nutzung der Kenntnisse aus spezifischen Programmen der Gemeinschaft für Forschung und technologische Entwicklung. Europäisches Parlament, 1991
