= Red berry =

Redberry or Red Berry may refer to:

- Rhamnus crocea, a Northwest American shrub in the buckthorn family
- Vaccinium vitis-idaea, commonly called lingonberry or cowberry
- Red Berry (Texas politician) (1899–1969), member of Texas House of Representatives and Senate
- Red Berry (wrestler) (1906–1973), American professional wrestler
- Redberry Lake (Saskatchewan)
- Rural Municipality of Redberry No. 435, Saskatchewan, Canada
- Redberry (electoral district), a former electoral district in Saskatchewan, Canada
- RedBerry, a competitor to the BlackBerry wireless e-mail device in China

== See also ==
- Ardisia crenata
- Redberry mite, a pest that plagues commercial blackberry growers in the United States
- Redberry moonseed
- Red olive berry
- Raspberry
- Redcurrant
- Strawberry
