= Carcan =

Carcan may refer to:

- Carcan, an iron ring used for a form of public humiliation by exposition at a pole, (see pillory or stocks)
- René Carcan (May 25, 1925—1993), a Belgian engraver and sculptor, who thrived in the late 20th century
- "Carcan", a track by the electronic music group Boards of Canada on their album Boc Maxima
- Operation Carcan, 1972 British Army operation in Derry, Northern Ireland.
