= Graciela Rodo Boulanger =

Bolivian painter (born 1935)

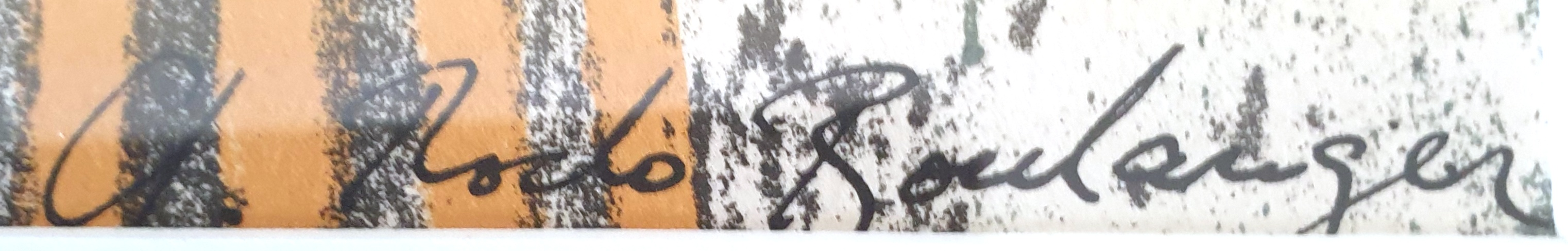
signature of Graciela Rodo Boulanger

Graciela Rodo (born 1935 in La Paz) is a Bolivian painter. She is noted for her artworks featuring stylized renderings of children.

== Early life ==
Her love of art was influenced by her mother, a concert pianist, and her father, a businessman and art connoisseur. She studied music and art throughout childhood, giving her first piano recital at age 15, and her first art exhibitions in Vienna and Salzburg at age 18.

== Artistic career ==
Pursuing her dream to be both a great artist and musician, Rodo soon found that time would not permit the necessary devotion to both her passions. At 22, she turned all of her energy to painting. She studied etching and printmaking along with René Carcan under Johnny Friedlaender in Paris. She married a Frenchman, Boulanger, so that her public name became Graciela Rodo de Boulanger (Spanish) and Graciela Rodo Boulanger (French). In 1966, her artistic ambition began to be realized when she published her first editions of engravings and first exhibited in the United States. In 1979, UNICEF designated her official artist for the International Year of the Child poster, and two of her tapestries were presented in the hall of the UN General Assembly. The Museum of Modern Art of Latin America, in Washington, DC, gave a retrospective of her oeuvre in 1983. In 1986, the Metropolitan Opera of New York commissioned her poster for Mozart’s The Magic Flute, and her paintings were shown by the Art Gallery of Lincoln Center. In 1993, the World Federation of the UN Associations chose one of her paintings to illustrate both a stamp and a limited-edition print on endangered species. A Fifty year retrospective entitled Five Decades took place at Gallery 444, San Francisco in 2006. More than 200 exhibitions of works by the artist Graciela Rodo Boulanger have been held on five continents of the globe.
