= Kobe Cools =

Belgian footballer (born 1997)

Personal information
- Date of birth: 25 July 1997 (age 29)
- Place of birth: Hingene, Belgium
- Height: 1.92 m (6 ft 4 in)
- Position: Centre-back

Team information
- Current team: Dender
- Number: 21

Youth career
- K.V.K. Hingene
- KSV Bornem
- 2005–2006: Anderlecht
- 2006–2011: Beerschot
- 2011–2018: Anderlecht

Senior career*
Years	Team	Apps	(Gls)
2018–2019	Anderlecht	0	(0)
2018–2019	→RWDM Brussels (loan)	11	(1)
2019–2022	F91 Dudelange	68	(7)
2022–	Dender	104	(5)
- * Club domestic league appearances and goals as of 11 May 2026

Kobe Cools (born 25 July 1997) is a Belgian professional football player who plays as a centre-back for Belgian Pro League club Dender, whom he captains.

== Career ==
Cools is a youth product of the Belgian clubs K.V.K. Hingene, KSV Bornem, Beerschot and Anderlecht. On 24 November 2017, he signed his first professional contract with Anderlecht until 2020, with an option to extend for another season. On 31 August 2018, he joined RWDM Brussels on a year-long loan where he made his senior debut.

On 6 August 2019, Cools transferred to the Luxembourg National Division club F91 Dudelange. He helped them win the 2021–22 Luxembourg National Division. On 13 June 2022, he signed a 2-year contract with Dender in the Challenger Pro League, and in his debut season helped them get promoted to the Belgian Pro League. On 30 August 2024, he extended his contract with Dender until 2026.

== Honours ==
F91 Dudelange

- Luxembourg National Division: 2021–22
