= Brigitte Coudrain =

French engraver and illustrator

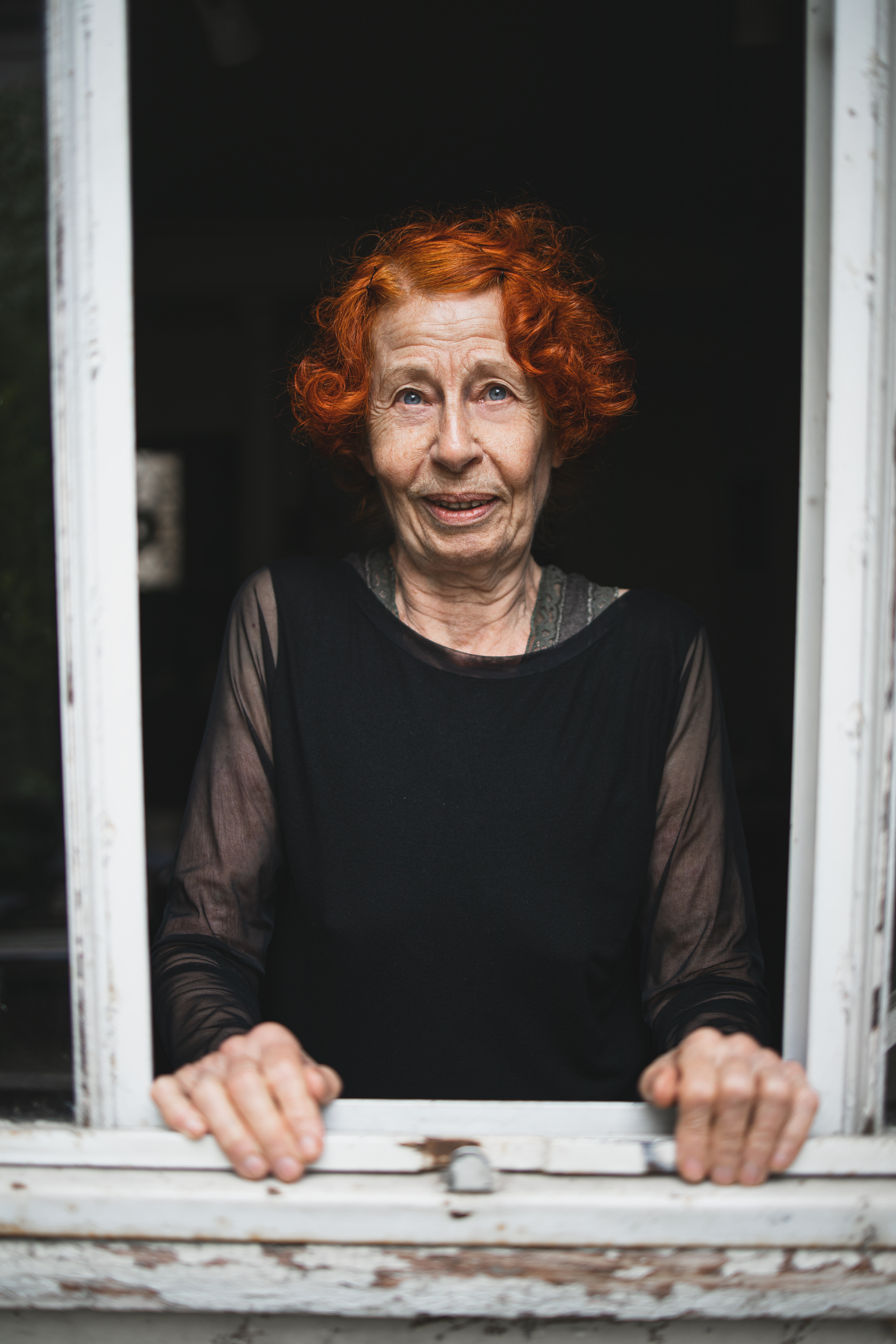
- Born: October 21, 1934 (age 90); Paris

Brigitte Coudrain (born 21 October 1934) is a French engraver, painter and illustrator.

In 1954 she studied in the studio of Johnny Friedlaender.

== Collections ==
- Smithsonian American Art Museum
- Metropolitan Museum of Art, New York
- Minneapolis Institute of Art
- Cantor Arts Center, Stanford University
- Ackland Art Museum
- McNay Art Museum
