= Andreas Nottebohm =

American and German artist (born 1944)

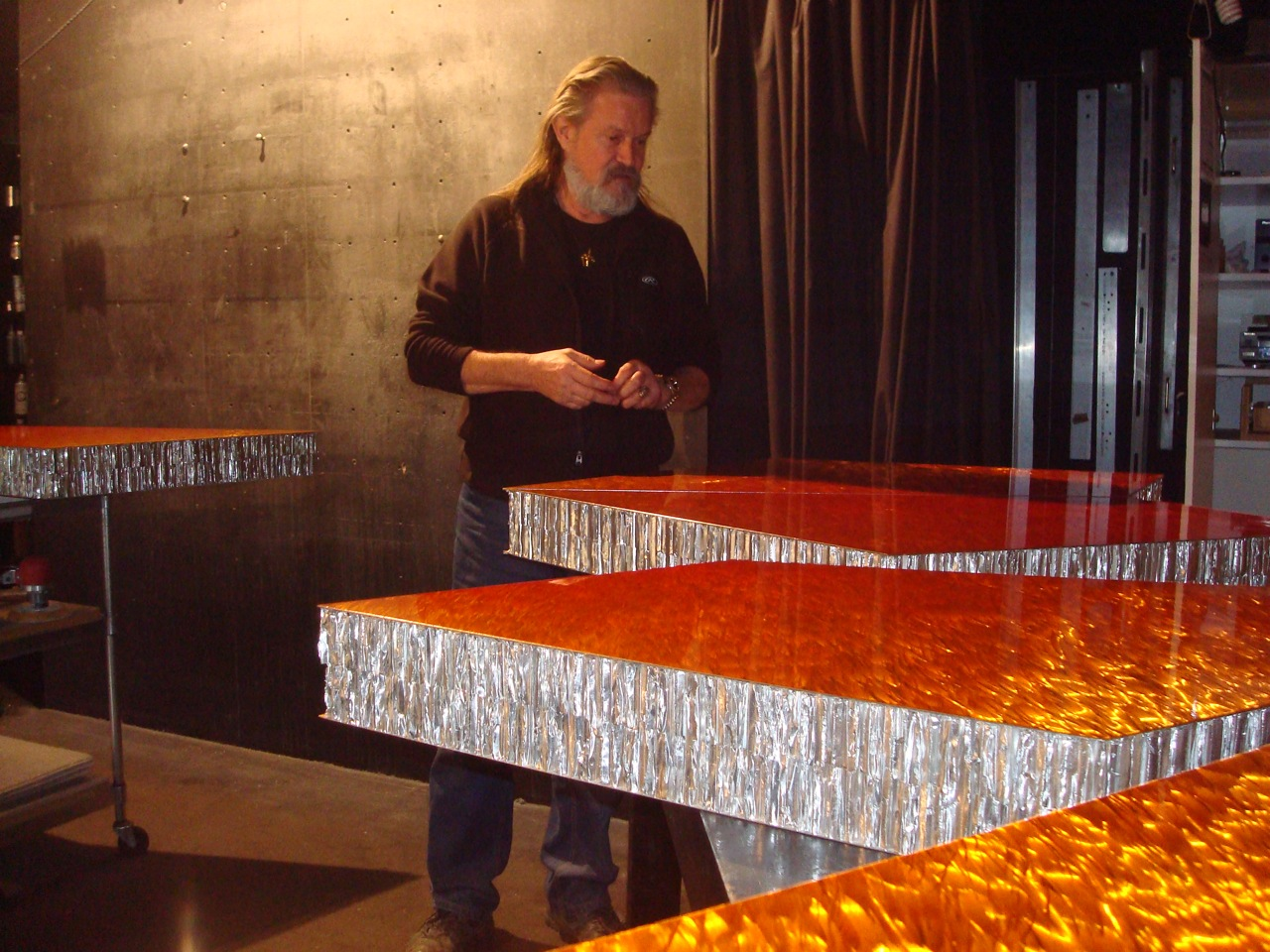
- Nottebohm sculpting in 2010
- Born: October 13, 1944; Eisenach, East Germany
- Education: Academy of Fine Arts, Munich
- Known for: Painting, Sculpture
- Movement: Op Art, Space Art

Andreas Nottebohm (born October 13, 1944) is an American / German artist who is considered the key innovator of Metal Art, and associated with Op art, visionary art, and space art.

== Life ==
Born and raised in Eisenach, East Germany, he moved to Munich, West Germany, as a teenager. From 1965 to 1969, he studied at the Academy of Fine Arts in Munich under surrealist painter Mac Zimmermann. In 1968, he studied etching at Johnny Friedlaender's workshop in Paris, France. From 1971 to 1974, he studied lithography in Salzburg, Austria. He returned to Munich in 1974. During the early 1970s, he first experimented with using metal as a canvas by utilizing used etching plates for his paintings. Nottebohm first visited the United States for a one-man exhibition in 1978. After traveling throughout the United States, he chose to make the San Francisco Bay Area his home.

== Career ==
Andreas Nottebohm first visited the United States for a one-man show with Galerie Ernst Hilger [Vienna] at WASH-ART in Washington, D.C., in 1978. Starting in 1981, NASA commissioned Nottebohm to create major works, including official paintings to commemorate the first launch of the Space Shuttle Columbia in 1981. His work has been featured in museums and galleries around the world including the permanent collections of the Crocker Art Museum in California, the Nevada Museum of Art, and the Air and Space Museum of the Smithsonian Institution. He has had over one hundred one-man shows in Europe and the United States.

== Critical assessment ==
- "Andreas Nottebohm, a true Art Prophet. He is an alchemist who transforms shimmering sheets of aluminum into what resemble the crosscurrents of life. If art is about getting the viewer to connect with an image, he's managed to do so---these works are mesmerizing."
- "The artist has refined his rotary-sander technique over four decades to create calligraphic works on metal that possess dazzling depth and movement. As you move, so do the curvilinear ripple patterns. Layers of hologram-like depth testify to the artist’s interest in astrophysics and fractals, and make these “windows on the universe” infinitely variable."
- "Andreas' abstract metal artwork hang on your wall much like a painting with a 3-dimensional movement to it. Andreas is the innovator of this process."
- "The gravitational pull of Nottebohm’s “Raw Metal Works” commands and compels beyond mere abstraction. The viewer is presented with the luminescence of space, its limitless volume – and a sense of wonder at being on the threshold of exploration."
- “The compelling metallic constructions of Andreas Nottebohm are at once seductive yet unnerving. They appear complex in their illusion of movement and yet seemingly elemental in form and texture.” Robert Flynn Johnson, Curator Emeritus, Achenbach Foundation for Graphic Arts, Fine Arts Museums of San Francisco
- "Nottebohm’s paintings go beyond the dialogue on painting’s nature to argue that there is more to the act of seeing than contemporary art criticism has recognized. He asserts with each reflection, and push-pull between surface and depth, that while infinite complexity may escape our reading, it nonetheless may be understood.” Lial A. Jones, Crocker Art Museum Director
- "Nottebohm’s raw yet refined paintings on aluminum lend themselves to rich multi-layered metaphors seemingly capable of continual regeneration that give viewers something very complex to look at and think about over time."
- "If Nottebohm's work is to be compared, it might be with the Bauhaus-inspired "Op-Art" movement of Vasarely, Stella, Reilly and others in the mid-1960s..."
- “Experiencing Nottebohm’s work is to take yourself on a journey to the unknowable... It is a journey of amazement.”
- “The painter Nottebohm penetrates into the inner secrets of the cosmos.”

== Selected museums and collections ==
- Adonal Foyle, Oakland, California
- Art in Embassies, U.S. Department of State
- Association of the Friends Haus der Kunst, Munich
- Bell Atlantic
- Crocker Art Museum, Sacramento, California
- Embassy of Germany, Canberra, Australia
- German Bundestag (Congress), Bonn
- Geico
- Hughes Aircraft
- Iomega, Utah
- iSearch Media, Inc., San Francisco, California
- Karl Kreuzer, Germany
- Kennedy Space Center, NASA Art Gallery
- Museum of Modern Art, Rio de Janeiro
- Nevada Museum of Art, Reno, Nevada
- Collection of the Free Library of Philadelphia
- City of Salzburg
- Satellite Business Systems
- Smithsonian Institution
- Sparkasse Schweinfurt-Haßberge, Schweinfurt
- Stephen W. Hawking: Portfolio A Brief History of My Time

== Selected productions and credits ==
- NASA 25th Anniversary CNN television special
- "In the Stream of Stars", a Soviet-American space art book.
- Painting "Dreams of Space" official poster of EXPO 86 World's Fair in Vancouver, British Columbia, Canada.
- Painting "First Night Launch" used as center foldout by OMNI magazine for May 1986 issue dedicated to the memory of the Challenger Seven crew.
- Lecture and slide show of photos from the launch of Columbia and paintings with astronomer Reinhard Breuer, from the Max Planck Institute
- Article in Zoom Magazine on Space Shuttle Columbia launch and Closest Encounter with Saturn.
- "Astropoeticon, Hommage a Pink Floyd", hardcover artbook with 39 original paintings and text by H.F. Franke

== Current project ==
Nottebohm is currently in the process of completing a ten-year project with Pete Sears of Jefferson Starship, Hot Tuna, and Moonalice, which combines twelve pure metal artworks with twelve "out-on-the-edge" pieces of experimental music.

== 30-year retrospective ==
Nottebohm's first museum retrospective opened at the University of Arizona Art Museum, on May 28, 2011, and ran through September 2011.
