= Jonathan Alves =

Portuguese football manager (born 1982)

Personal information
- Full name: Jonathan Juveliano Silva Oliveira Alves
- Date of birth: 2 December 1982 (age 43)
- Place of birth: Choisy-le-Roi, France

Team information
- Current team: Dender EH (manager)

Managerial career
- Years: Team
- 2026–: Dender EH

Jonathan Juveliano Silva Oliveira Alves (born 2 December 1982) is a Portuguese football manager. He is the manager of Belgian club Dender EH.

== Career ==
Alves was born in Choisy-le-Roi, France, to Portuguese parents and raised in Portugal. After assisting Bruno Cardoso at União da Madeira and Penafiel, he was assistant to Vítor Oliveira at Arouca in 2012–13, earning promotion to the Primeira Liga. He then assisted Paulo Alves at Nassaji Mazandaran in Iran, and spent four years alongside Alain Casanova at Lens and Toulouse of France and Lausanne-Sport in Switzerland.

In September 2022, Alves moved to Belgium, where he assisted Vincent Euvrard at RWDM and Zulte Waregem. He was hired by Anderlecht to assist David Hubert in September 2024. In July 2025, he joined Club Brugge as part of Ivan Leko's staff.

On 1 July 2026, Alves had his first appointment as a head coach, at Dender EH, newly relegated to Belgium's second-tier Challenger Pro League. His debut on 14 August was a 1–0 loss away to Sporting Hasselt.

== Personal life ==
As of his appointment at Dender EH, Alves spoke Portuguese, French, Spanish and English, had a command of Italian and was looking to learn Dutch.
