= Daniel Hulet =

Belgian cartoonist

Daniel Hulet (25 August 1945 in Etterbeek – 9 September 2011 in Ostend) was a Belgian cartoonist.

He began his career in advertising before collaborating with several weekly The Adventures of Tintin and Spirou comic strips. In 1980, he began Pharaoh with André-Paul Duchateau. In 1985, he joined the monthly publication Lived, where he created The Paths of Glory with Jan Bucquoy. Two years later, he began Morbid State, a post-industrial trilogy, for publisher Glénat. He returned to Pharoh in 1996.

In 2003, he moved to a new publisher, Casterman, and created the comic Extra-Muros. He died in 2011.
