= Johnny Friedlaender =

German painter (1912–1992)

- Born: Gotthard Joachim Friedlaender; 26 December 1912; Pleß, Province of Silesia, German Empire
- Died: 18 June 1992 (aged 79); 14th arrondissement of Paris, French Fifth Republic
- Education: Staatliche Akademie für Kunst und Kunstgewerbe Breslau
- Known for: Aquatint
- Movement: New School of Paris
- Spouse: Helfrida Wenzel
- Partner: Brigitte Coudrain
- Website: johnnyfriedlaender.eu

Signature
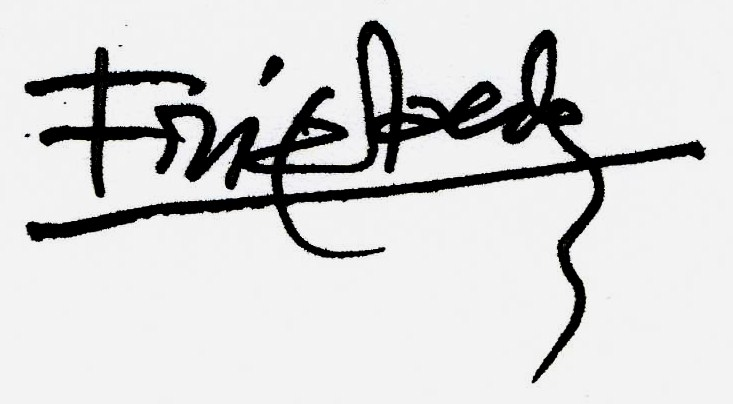

Johnny Friedlaender (26 December 1912 – 18 June 1992) was a leading German/French 20th-century artist, whose works have been exhibited in Germany, France, Netherlands, Italy, Japan and the United States. He has been influential upon other notable artists, who were students in his Paris gallery. Johnny painted using oils and watercolors but his preferred medium was aquatint etching which is a technically difficult artistic process, of which Friedlaender has been a pioneer.

== Early years ==
Friedlaender was born in Pless, Prussian Silesia, as the son of a pharmacist. He graduated from a Breslau high school in 1922 and then attended the Staatliche Akademie für Kunst und Kunstgewerbe Breslau, where he studied under Otto Mueller. He graduated from the academy as a master student in 1928. In 1930 he moved to Dresden where he held exhibitions at the J. Sandel Gallery and at the Dresden Art Museum. He was in Berlin for part of 1933, and then journeyed to Paris. After two years in a Nazi concentration camp, he emigrated to Czechoslovakia, where he settled in Ostrava, where he held the first one-man show of his etchings.

== Re-entry to Paris ==
In 1936 Friedlaender journeyed to Czechoslovakia, Switzerland, Austria, France and Belgium. At The Hague, he held a successful exhibition of etchings and watercolours. He fled to Paris in 1937 as a political refugee of the Nazi regime with his young wife, who was an actress. In that year he held an exhibition of his etchings which included the works: L 'Equipe and Matieres et Formes. From 1939 to 1943, he was interned in a series of concentration camps, but survived against poor odds.

After freedom in 1944, Friedlaender began a series of twelve etchings entitled Images du Malheur, with Sagile as his publisher. In the same year he received a commission to illustrate four books by the brothers Jean and Jérôme Tharaud of the French Academy. In 1945 he worked for several newspapers including Cavalcade and Carrefour. He produced the work Rêves Cosmiques in 1947 and the same year became a member of the Salon de Mai, a position he held until 1969. In 1948, he began a friendship with the painter Nicolas de Staël and held his first exhibition in Copenhagen at Galerie Birch. The following year he showed for the first time in Galerie La Hune in Paris. After living in Paris for 13 years, Friedlaender acquired French nationality by naturalization on 28 November 1952.

Friedlaender expanded his geographic scope in 1951 and exhibited in Tokyo in a modern art show. In the same year he was a participant in the XI Triennale in Milan, Italy. By 1953 he had produced works for a one-man show at the Museum of Neuchâtel and exhibited at the Galerie Moers in Amsterdam, the II Camino Gallery in Rome, in São Paulo, Brazil and in Paris. He was a participant of the French Italian Art Conference in Turin, Italy that same year.

== International recognition ==
Friedlaender accepted an international art award in 1957, becoming the recipient of the Biennial Kakamura Prize in Tokyo. In 1959 he received a teaching post awarded by UNESCO at the Museum of Modern Art in Rio de Janeiro. By 1968 Friedlaender was travelling to Puerto Rico, New York City and Washington, D.C. to hold exhibitions. That year he also purchased a home in the Burgundy region of France. 1971 was another year of diverse international travel including shows in Bern, Milan, Paris, Krefeld and again New York. In the latter city he exhibited paintings at the Far Gallery, a venue becoming well known for its patronage of important twentieth-century artists.

From his atelier in Paris Friedlaender instructed younger artists who themselves went on to become noteworthy, among them Arthur Luiz Piza, Brigitte Coudrain, Rene Carcan, Andreas Nottebohm, and Graciela Rodo Boulanger. Like Friedlaender, these students were expert in the lithographic and etching arts. He also taught printmaker Martha Zelt.

1978 brought a retrospective of Friedlaender's works at the Musee d’Art Moderne de la Ville de Paris. He was awarded the Lovis Corinth Prize in Regensburg three years later. On his 75th birthday, Friedlaender was given a retrospective in the Bremen Art Museum. On his 80th birthday a retrospective exhibition was held in Bonn, Germany at the municipal council offices. Friedlaender died in Paris at the age of 80.

== Art Value ==
Since 2000 the record price for works by Johnny Friedlaender at auction is US$8,828 for an oil painting titled PAYSAGE VII, VII 1979 which sold at Artcurial in 2007.

== Selected works ==
- Enigme handsigned edition of 150 (1991)
- Jeux, handsigned edition of 150
- Sonnette für Orpheus, handsigned edition of 135
- Radierungen 1949-1989: Eine Auswahl, colour album published by Peerlings Gallery

== See also ==
- List of German painters
