= Fabrice Mvemba =

Democratic Republic of the Congo footballer

Personal information
- Full name: Fabrice Mvemba
- Date of birth: December 20, 1980 (age 45)
- Place of birth: Etterbeek, Belgium
- Height: 1.82 m (6 ft 0 in)
- Position: Defender

Youth career
- 1999–2000: Tubize

Senior career*
Years	Team	Apps	(Gls)
2000–2007	Tubize	161	(15)
2007–2009	Dender EH	11	(0)

International career
2008–	Congo DR	7	(0)
- * Club domestic league appearances and goals

Fabrice Mvemba (born 20 December 1980) is a retired football defender from Congo DR. He last played for Dender EH in Belgium.

== Career ==
Mvemba began his career 1999 by Tubize, before signing a contract with Dender EH in July 2007. He retired in 2009.
