= Cauchie House =

Historic Art Nouveau house in Brussels, Belgium

- Maison Cauchie (French); Huis Cauchie (Dutch)
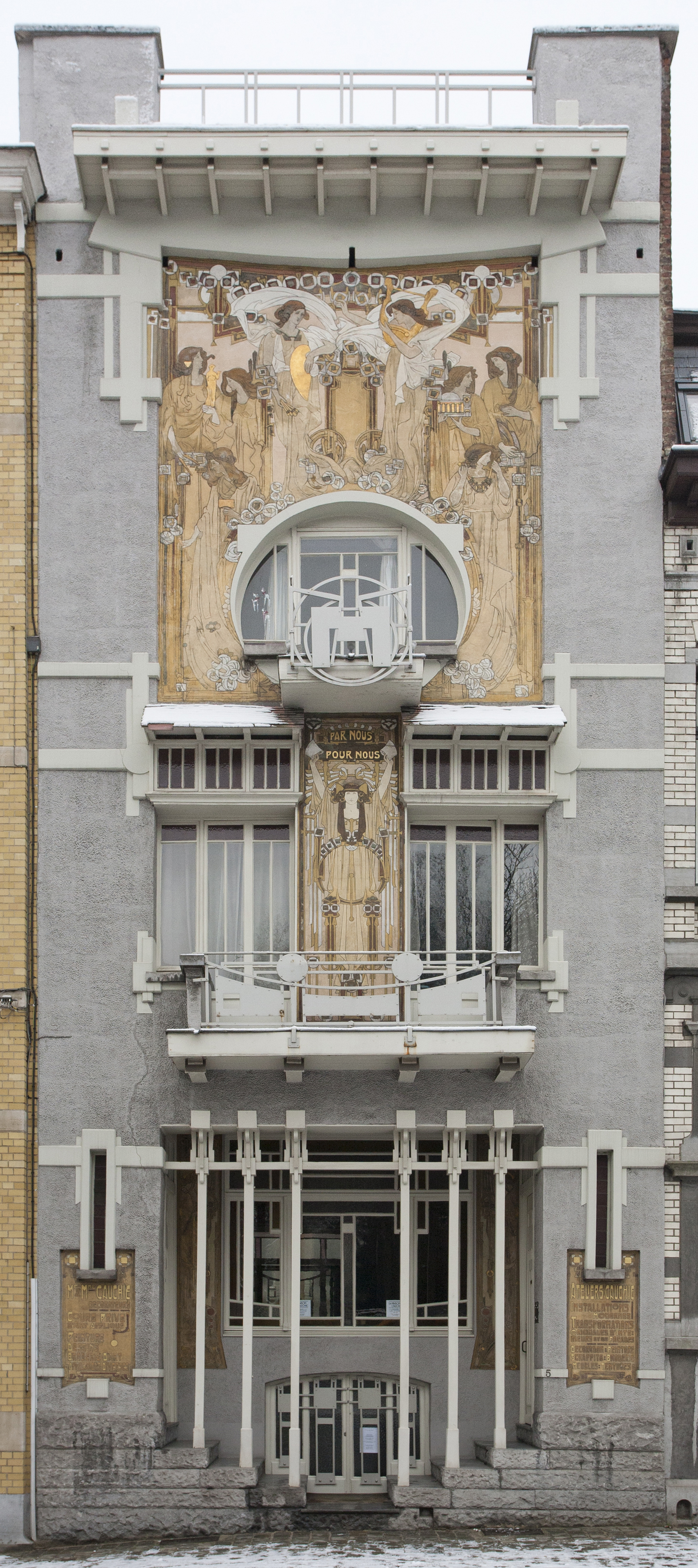
- Main façade of the Cauchie House
- Interactive map of the Cauchie House area

General information
- Type: Town house
- Architectural style: Art Nouveau
- Location: Rue des Francs / Frankenstraat 5, 1040 Etterbeek, Brussels-Capital Region, Belgium
- Coordinates: 50°50′18″N 4°23′43″E
- Current tenants: Dessicy family
- Completed: 1905
- Client: Paul Cauchie

Design and construction
- Architect: Paul Cauchie
- Other designers: Caroline Voet

Website
- cauchie.be/en/the-cauchie-house

The Cauchie House (French: Maison Cauchie; Dutch: Huis Cauchie or Cauchiehuis) is a historic town house in Brussels, Belgium. It was designed by the architect, painter, and designer Paul Cauchie, and built in 1905, in Art Nouveau style. Its façade is remarkable for its allegorical sgraffito decoration.

The house is located at 5, rue des Francs/Frankenstraat in the municipality of Etterbeek, next to the Parc du Cinquantenaire/Jubelpark.

== Background ==
Paul Cauchie was sixteen when he began his architectural studies at the Royal Academy of Fine Arts in Antwerp (in the classes of Joseph Schadde and Léonard Blomme). Very soon afterwards, he enrolled at the Royal Academy of Fine Arts in Brussels (in the class of Constant Montald), where he studied painting (as a pupil of Jean Portaels) and the sgraffito technique, and followed courses in decorative painting between 1893 and 1898. From 1895, whilst still pursuing his studies, Cauchie started to work for a living. Apart from his own house, only three houses built by Cauchie are known: two others in Brussels and one at Duinbergen, next to Knokke-Heist, in West Flanders, Belgium. As Cauchie was more of a decorator than an architect, he specialised in designing sgraffito for architecture.

Cauchie met his future wife in the Royal Academy of Fine Arts. Carolina 'Lina' Voet achieved a very good level in painting, enabling her to teach drawing and painting privately. They married in 1905 and decided to build a house on the 6-metre-wide (20 ft) plot of land Cauchie bought at 5, rue des Francs/Frankenstraat, next to the Parc du Cinquantenaire/Jubelpark in Brussels. He designed the front of the house with the intention of advertising and selling their work: sgraffito for him and art teaching for her. As the house was easily seen from the neighbouring roads, it drew the attention of passers-by and demonstrated their know-how.

== Building ==
At the very centre of the façade, Cauchie drew the words "Par Nous — Pour Nous" (English: By Us — For Us). The house was designed, from the very beginning, as a joint work intended for private use. Cauchie did the drawings for the house but worked together with his wife to design and decorate their home-workshop. Cauchie and his wife filled the house with their multiple works of art (i.e. paintings, wall coverings, furniture, etc.)

The Cauchie House is a good example of the application of the principle of a unified work of art or Gesamtkunstwerk ("total work of art") in architecture. Cauchie and his wife wanted that the distinction between the main art forms (architecture, painting, sculpture) and the minor art forms (decorative arts) disappeared to become part of the global œuvre.

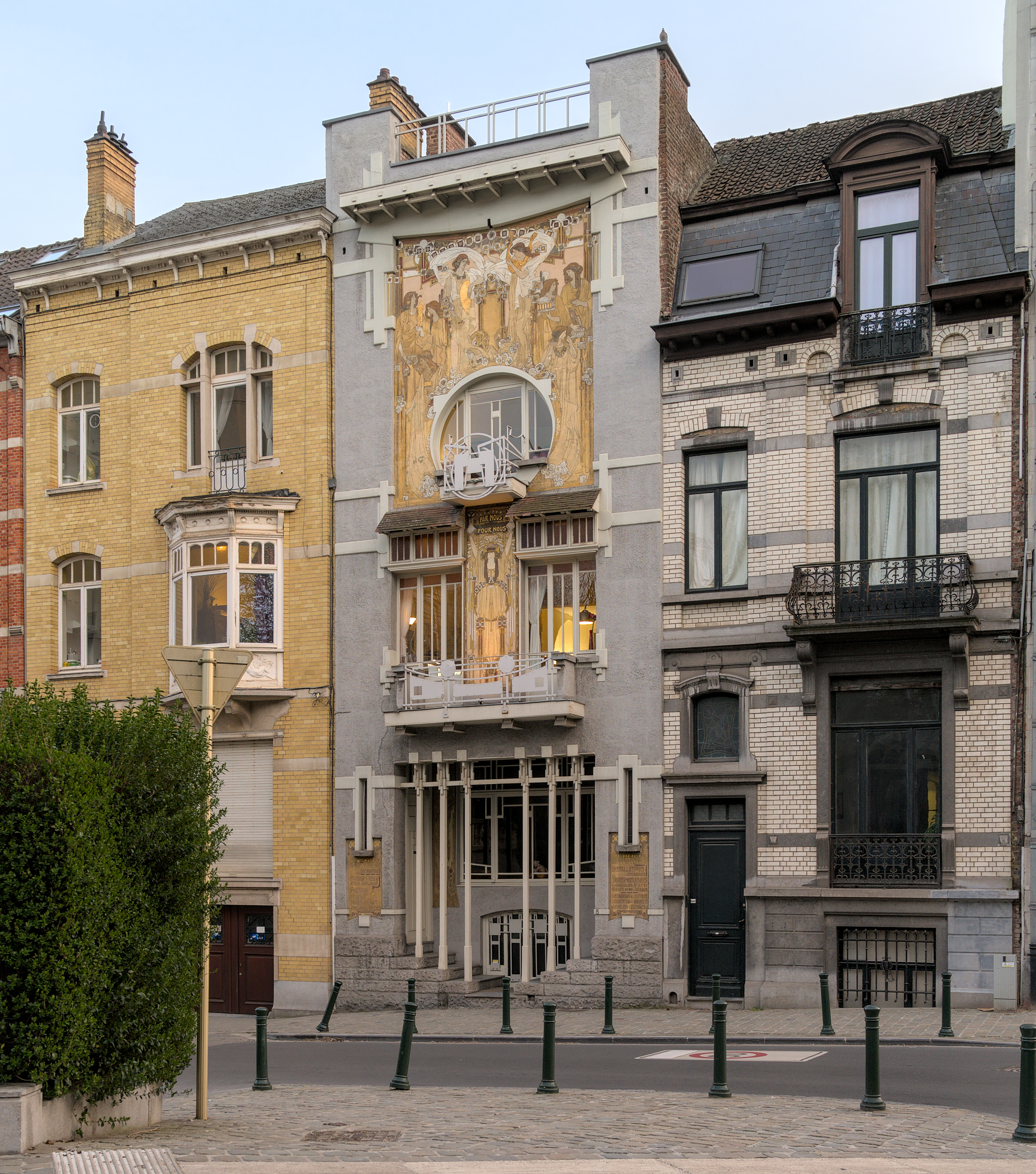
The Cauchie House (centre) with its two neighbours

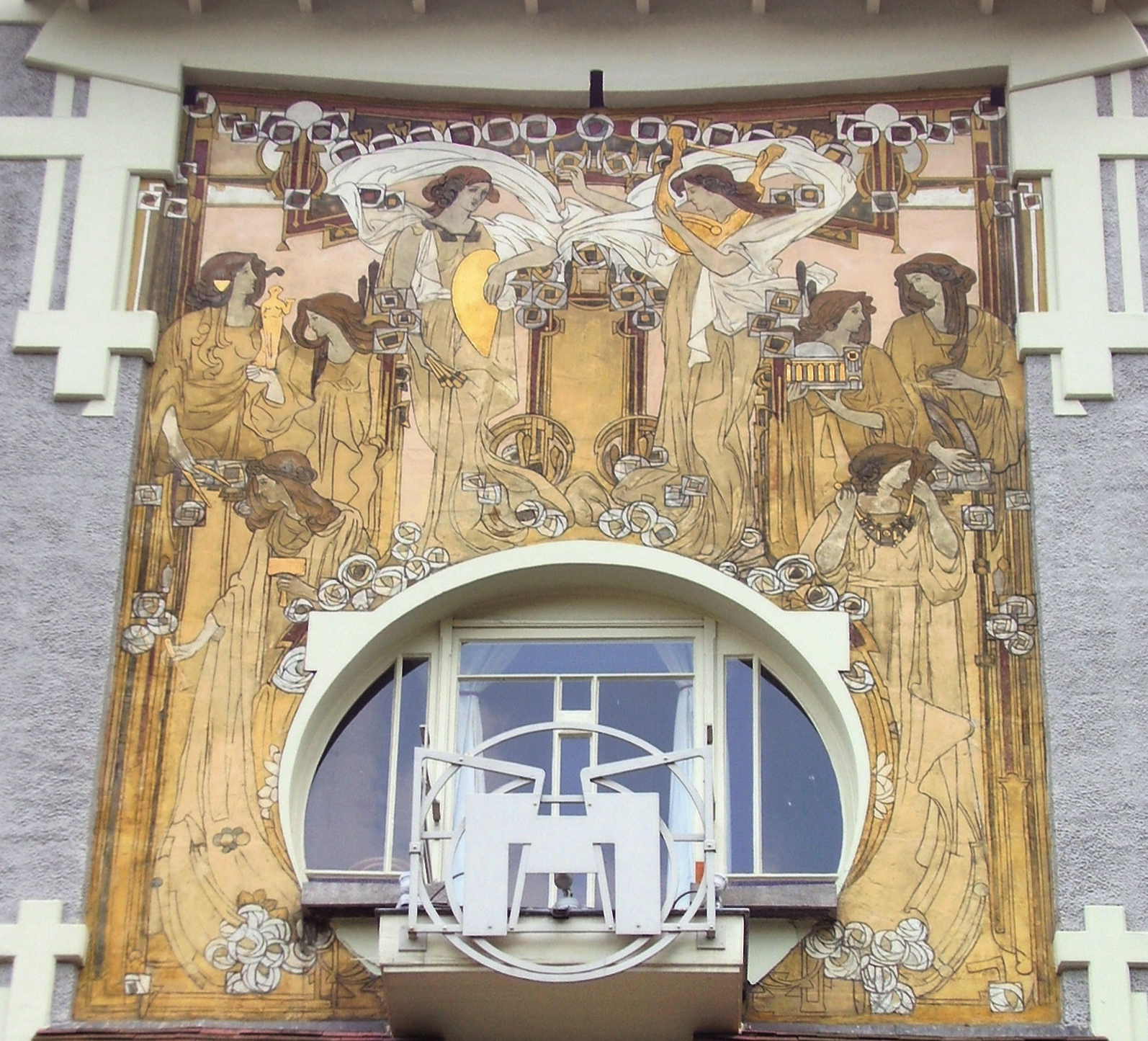
Sgraffito by Cauchie on his residence and studio

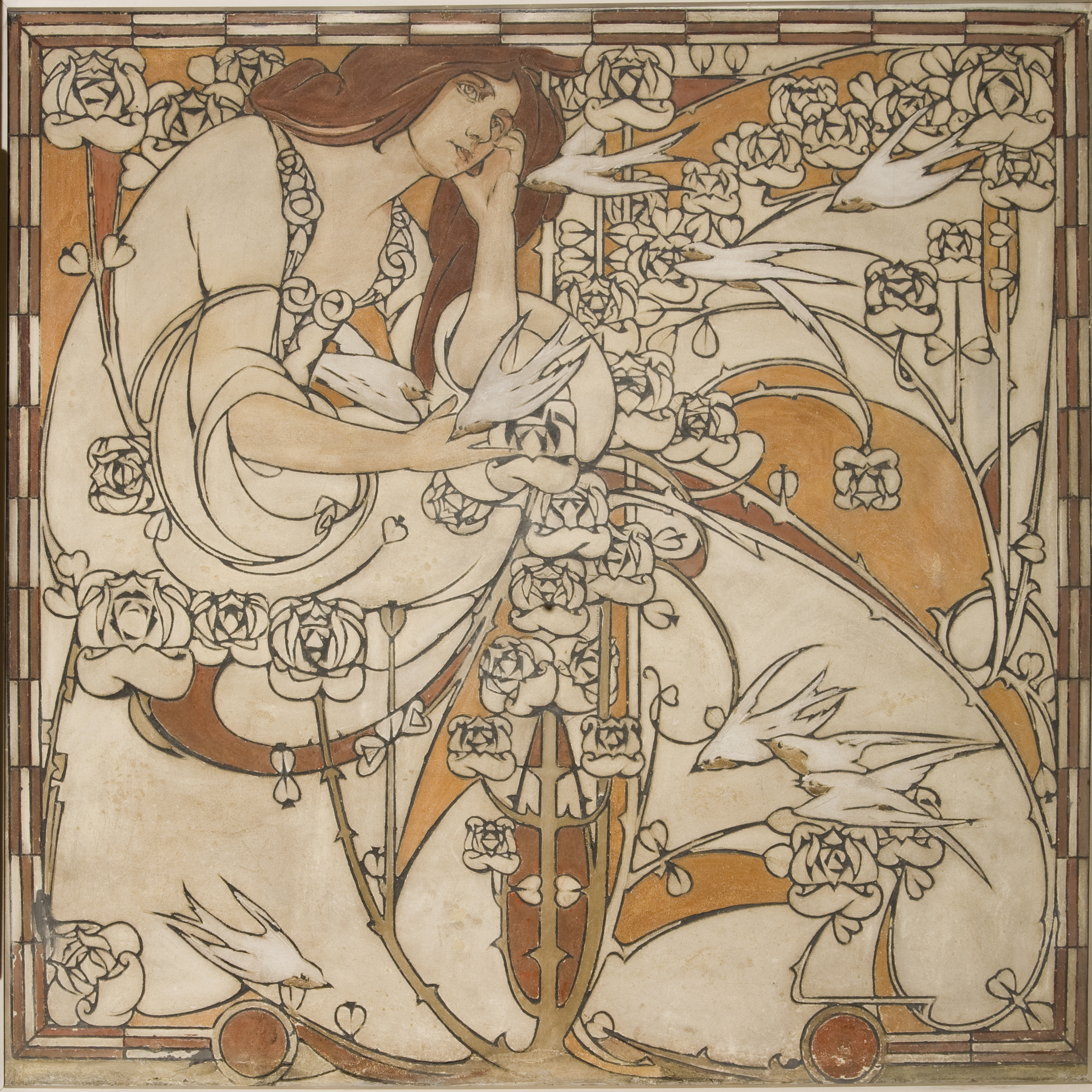
Sgraffito panel in the Cauchie House

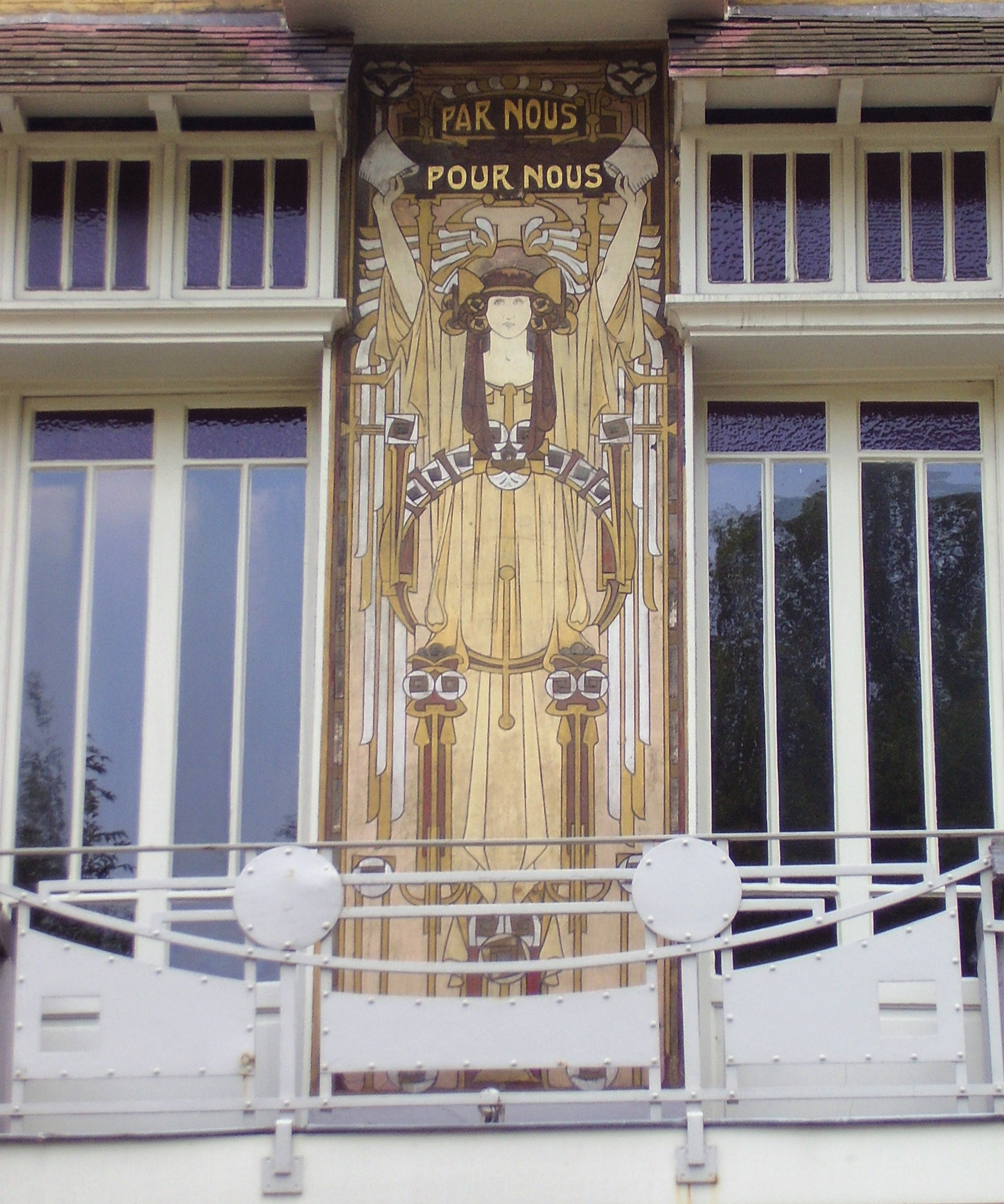
"Par Nous — Pour Nous" (English: By Us — For Us), a joint work intended for private use

== Tintin Museum ==
In 1979, the Cauchie House's saving led to the idea of using it to house an Adventures of Tintin museum in cooperation with their creator, Hergé. Symbolically, on Christmas Day, 1980, Hergé gave Dessicy his official agreement to the project. Dessicy undertook an intensive study with Bob De Moor, who laid the bases of the scenography. A scale model was made by the Studios Hergé. Dessicy started looking for sponsors and supports. In the meantime, he devoted himself to saving another building, the former Magasins Waucquez, work of the Belgian architect Victor Horta. Despite many steps taken to find sponsors, Dessicy did not succeed in creating sufficient interest to complete his project of a Tintin Museum at the Cauchie House. Eventually, Desiccy succeeded in turning the Magasins Waucquez into the Belgian Comic Strip Center.

== Today ==
The basement, containing the cellars and Paul Cauchie's workshop, has been converted into a vast gallery, exhibiting photos, paintings, and archive documents, meticulously collected over the years by the Maison Cauchie ASBL. They illustrate the stages of the house's restoration and the artistic activities of Paul and Lina Cauchie. The ground floor freed of the unfortunate alteration carried out by the successive occupants after Paul's death has recovered its original appearance. The two upper floors of the house have been converted into apartments and renovated in accordance with contemporary needs.

== See also ==
- Art Nouveau in Brussels
- History of Brussels
- Culture of Belgium
- Belgium in the long nineteenth century
