= RedBerry =

Blackberry's competitor in China

RedBerry is BlackBerry's competitor in China. Like the Research in Motion (RIM) technology, it also features push e-mail service through a low-cost RedBerry package.

== Background ==
RedBerry was launched by China Unicom, a state-run telecommunications company and the second largest in China. It was announced to counter the announced entry of RIM's (Research In Motion) wireless email device in China in 2006. RedBerry's introduction immediately acknowledged that it is an imitation of BlackBerry, citing that it is the most successful application of push-email service. In a statement, China Unicom said that the "RedBerry name extends the vivid name of Blackberry that people are already familiar with" while adding that the branding also integrated the red symbol of China Unicom.

Upon launch, RedBerry devices were sold for less than a dollar a month (5 renminbi/$0.62) per month and charged 0.30 renminbi for each email sent. Incoming emails were free. During this period, BlackBerry users in Hong Kong paid $64 for unlimited email monthly.

== See also ==
- Brand piracy
