= Mehdi Bounou =

Belgian footballer (born 1997)

Personal information
- Date of birth: 8 December 1997 (age 28)
- Height: 1.60 m (5 ft 3 in)
- Position: Midfielder

Team information
- Current team: Hasselt
- Number: 10

Youth career
- –2014: Mons
- 2014–2017: OH Leuven

Senior career*
Years	Team	Apps	(Gls)
2016–2017	OH Leuven	1	(0)
2017–2018	Heist	18	(2)
2018–2019	Eendracht Aalst	23	(0)
2019–2020	Hasselt	14	(3)
2020–2024	Patro Eisden	74	(11)
2024	→ Belisia Bilzen (loan)	14	(6)
2024–	Hasselt	55	(26)
- * Club domestic league appearances and goals as of 2 May 2026

Mehdi Bounou (born 2 May 1997) is a Belgian professional footballer who plays as a midfielder for Hasselt.

== Career ==
Bounou made his professional debut for OH Leuven on 8 January 2017, being in the starting lineup in the away match against Union SG. Following the 2016–17 season, he was released to Heist.
