= Philippe Geluck =

Belgian comedian, humorist, television writer and cartoonist

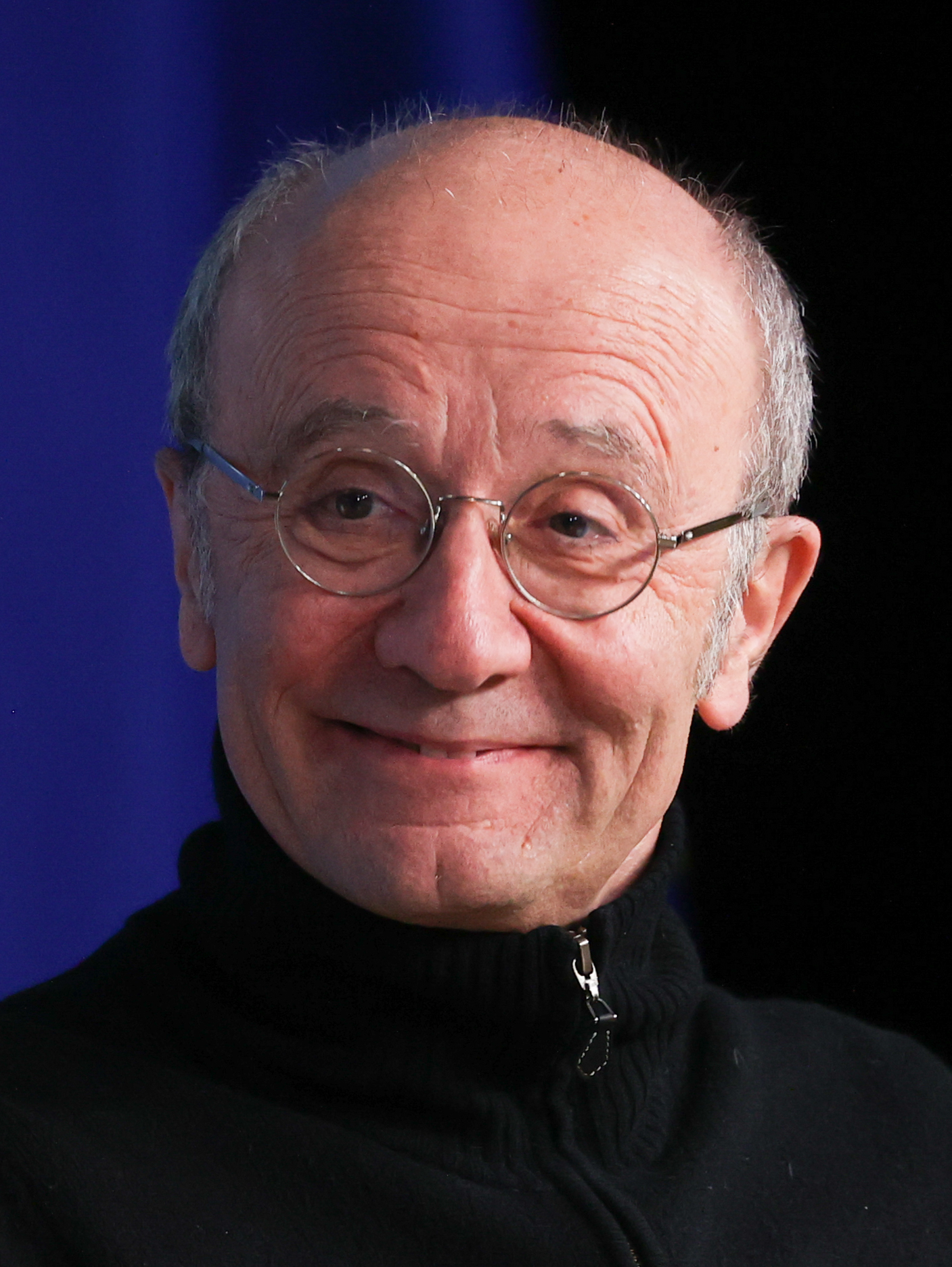
- Philippe Geluck in 2024
- Born: 7 May 1954 (age 72); Brussels, Belgium
- Education: INSAS
- Occupations: Comedian; cartoonist; humorist; writer
- Website: www.geluck.com

Philippe Geluck (born 7 May 1954 in Belgium) is a Belgian comedian, humorist, television writer and cartoonist, who sold more than 14 million albums worldwide. He studied at the INSAS. His best-known work is the comic strip Le Chat (Le Cat in English-language editions), which is one of the ten bestselling Franco-Belgian comics series.

Geluck created Le Chat in 1983, for publication in the daily newspaper Le Soir. By 1987, the strip is published in multiple newspapers and the first album in what will become a long series is put in print. In the 2000s, Le Chat went global, being translated into several languages and reproduced beyond French-speaking regions, such as the United States and Iran.

While drawing Le Chat, Geluck also published other albums and series: Le Fils du Chat, Docteur G, Encyclopédies Universelles, Les Aventures de Scott Leblanc, Geluck se lâche.

Geluck is also a theatre actor, and well known to the French-speaking public as a television personality, with his own shows (Lollipop, L’esprit de famille, La Semaine infernale, Le Jeu des dictionnaire) and as co-host with Laurent Ruquier and Michel Drucker.

In addition to having received other honours, King Albert II of Belgium made him a Commander of the Order of the Crown (Belgium) in 2009.
