= FCV Dender EH =

Belgian football club

Dender
- Full name: Football Club Verbroedering (Dender Eendracht Hekelgem)
- Founded: 1935; 91 years ago
- Ground: Florent Beeckmanstadion, Denderleeuw
- Capacity: 6,429
- Owner: Sihar Sitorus
- CEO: Belinda Siahaan
- Head coach: Jonathan Alves
- League: Challenger Pro League
- 2025–26: Belgian Pro League, 16th of 16 (relegated via play-offs)
- Website: www.fcvdendereh.be
Home colours	Away colours

Football Club Verbroedering Dender Eendracht Hekelgem, also simply known as Dender or FCV Dender EH, is a Belgian professional football club based in Denderleeuw. The club will play in the Challenger Pro League following their loss against Lommel SK in the relegation play-offs.

The club is named after former clubs KFC Denderleeuw Eendracht Hekelgem and Verbroedering Denderhoutem, which merged at the end of the 2004–05 season, and after the river Dender, which crosses the town of Denderleeuw. The home stadium of the club is Florent Beeckmanstadion, located in Denderleeuw. Their best league ranking was 12th place in the first division (in 2024–25). The club colours are blue, red, white and black.

== History ==
=== Early history ===
Verbroedering Denderhoutem was founded in 1935 and registered to the Royal Belgian Football Association in 1943. They first reached the Promotion (4th-highest level in Belgian football) in the 1980s. After several relegations and promotions in the provincial leagues and Promotion, the club finally reached the third division in 1998–99. They remained at that level except for one season in 2003–04 when they played in the Promotion. After one season back at the third level, Denderhoutem merged with fellow club KFC Denderleeuw EH from the third division.

=== Rise to the top tier ===
Verbroedering Dender won consecutively the third division A title (in 2005–06) and the second division title (in 2006–07), to reach the first division in 2007–08 for the first time in their history. They achieved promotion after beating Dessel 0–2 on the second division's 33rd match day on 13 May 2007. They finished at the 15th place in 2007–08 and again in 2008–09, though the club was relegated at the end of the 2008–09 season because the number of clubs in the first division was reduced from 18 to 16.

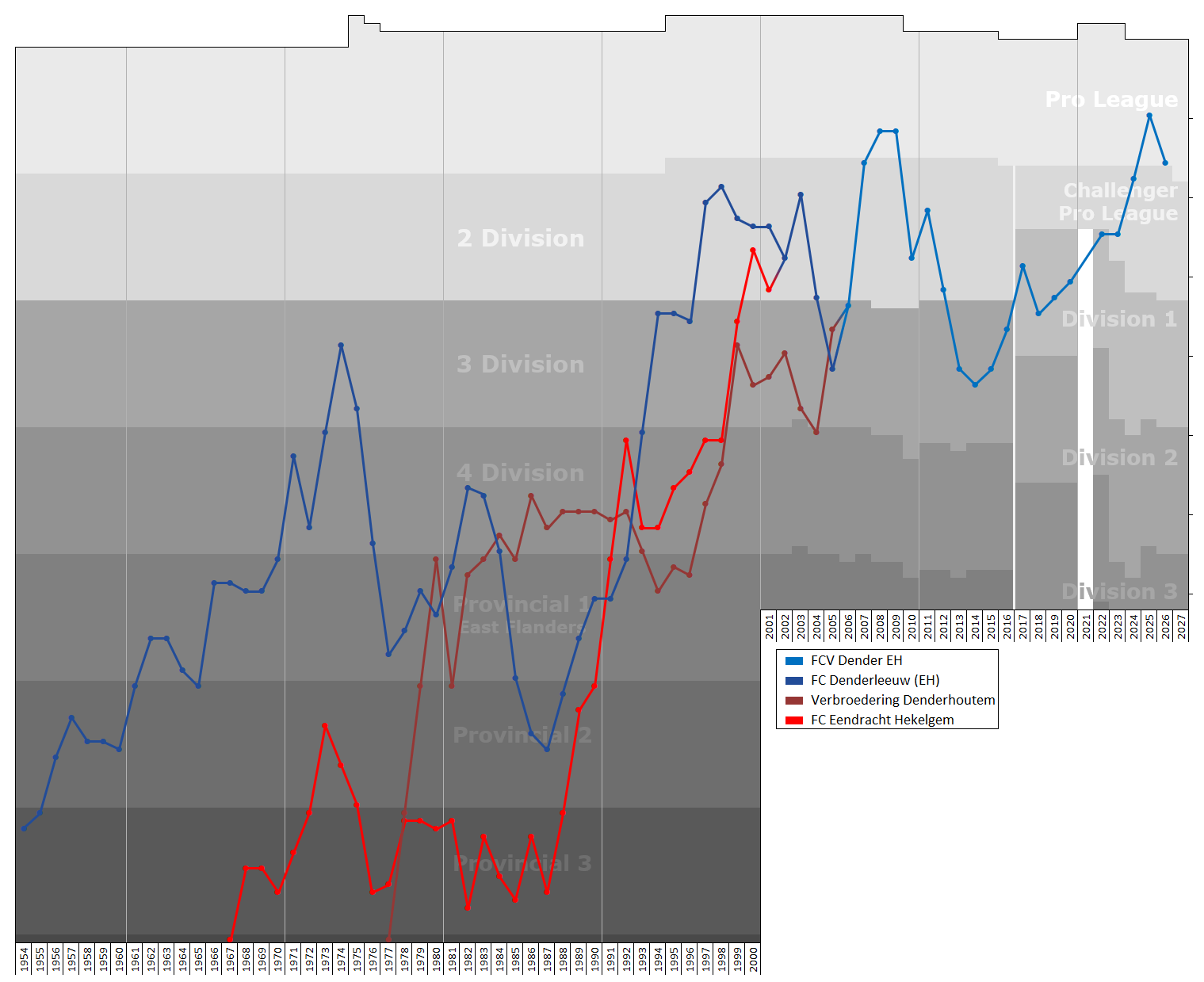
Historical chart of Dender league performance

=== Post–top division history ===
The club was relegated from the Second Division in the 2011–12 season after finishing second bottom.

In the 2015–16 season, Dender qualified for the newly formed Belgian third tier named Belgian First Amateur Division. In the 2020–21 season, the division was renamed Belgian National Division 1 but the season was cancelled after one game due to the COVID-19 pandemic in Belgium.

They won promotion back to the second tier, now renamed the Challenger Pro League, in the 2021–22 season. The promotion was not without controversy. On the penultimate game of the promotion play-offs against RFC Liège on 22 May 2022, Dender lost 1–0 which saw them move into second place and Liège move to first place. The following day, it was announced that Liège would receive a three-point deduction and a €1000 fine after failing to field enough U21 players in their 3–0 win against Dender back in March 2022. As a result, Dender were awarded a 5–0 win and moved back to the top of the table. Liège released a statement to say that they would be appealing the decision. However, the points deduction would turn out to be irrelevant. This is because Liège lost on the final game of the season against Knokke, while Dender won 1–0 against Dessel Sport.

=== Return to top flight and relegation ===
Dender won promotion back to the Belgian Pro League in the 2023–24 season. They finished second in the Challenger Pro League to secure their promotion. This meant it would be the first time that the club had played in the top flight since 2009. Before the start of the season, the club was dealt with the blow of the departure of manager Timmy Simons who left to join fellow top tier side Westerlo. Vincent Euvrard, then manager of Zulte Waregem, was appointed manager of the club. The club would stay up in their first season back in the top flight, finishing 12th. The next season, Euvrard would leave to join fellow pro league club Standard Liège. Hayk Milkon, assistant manager of Club Brugge, was brought in as his replacement. On 25 February 2026, Milkon was dismissed with the club in last place and on a four-game losing streak. He was replaced by Yannick Ferrera on 26 February 2026. The club finished last place in the regular season and later last place in the relegation play-offs. However, due to the expansion of the league from 16 to 18 clubs at the start of the 2026-27 season, they qualified for the promotion/relegation play-offs against Lommel SK. They lost the first leg 2-3, and drew the second leg 0-0, confirming their relegation to the 2026-27 Challenger Pro League.

== Honours ==
- Belgian Second Division / Challenger Pro League (level 2)
  - Winners: 2006–07
  - Runners-up: 2023–24
- Belgian Third Division A / Belgian National Division 1 (level 3)
  - Winners: 2005–06, 2021–22

== Coaching staff ==
Position	Name
Head coach	(Portugal) Jonathan Alves
Assistant coach	(Belgium) Killian Overmeire
First Team Coach	(Belgium) Mario Kohnen
Goalkeeping Coach	(Belgium) Dany Verlinden
Fitness coach	(France) Barthélémy Delecroix
Video Analyst	(Belgium) Arthur Snoeks

== Players ==
=== Current squad ===
As of 25 September 2026

Note: Flags indicate national team as defined under FIFA eligibility rules; some limited exceptions apply. Players may hold more than one non-FIFA nationality.

No.	Pos.	Nation	Player
1	GK	BEL	Louis Fortin
2	DF	GLP	Christopher Jullien
6	DF	BEL	Bo De Kerf
7	FW	CMR	Emmanuel Mballa Amougou
8	MF	POL	Oskar Szulc
9	FW	MKD	David Toshevski
11	MF	FRA	Kembo Diliwidi
12	DF	POR	Pedro Gomes
13	GK	BDI	Mattéo Nkurunziza
14	FW	BEL	Gerard Vandeplas (on loan from Antwerp)
15	MF	POL	Krzysztof Koton
16	GK	BEL	Julien Devriendt
17	MF	BEL	Pjotr Kestens

No.	Pos.	Nation	Player
18	MF	BEL	Nathan Rodes
20	DF	SVK	David Hrnčár
21	DF	BEL	Kobe Cools (captain)
22	DF	BEL	Ilias Breugelmans
23	DF	HAI	Martin Expérience
24	MF	FRA	Malcolm Viltard
45	MF	BEL	Amine Daali
50	GK	BEL	Yannick Conde
53	MF	BEL	Adam Nhaili (on loan from Sint-Truiden)
60	MF	BEL	Oumar Balde
67	DF	MAR	Nail Moutha-Sebtaoui
70	DF	ANG	Marsoni Sambu

== Notable players ==
Had international caps for their respective countries, held any club record, or had more than 100 league appearances. Players whose name is listed in bold represented their countries.

- (Angola) **Marsoni Sambu**
- (Belgium) **Senne Lammens**
- (Belgium) Xavier Gies
- (Belgium) Ridwane M'Barki
- (Belgium) Lennard Hens
- (Belgium) Nathan Rodes
- (Belgium) Kobe Cools
- (Belgium) Kenneth Houdret
- (Bosnia and Herzegovina) **Sulejman Smajic**
- (Bosnia and Herzegovina) **Ervin Zukanović**
- (Bosnia and Herzegovina) **Admir Aganović**
- (Burundi) **Emmanuel Ngama**
- (Canada) **Luc de Fougerolles**
- (Chad) **Kevin Nicaise**
- (Chad) **Nadjim Haroun**
- (Democratic Republic of the Congo) **Patrick Dimbala**
- (Democratic Republic of the Congo) **Ibrahim Somé**
- (Democratic Republic of the Congo) **Fabrice Mvemba**
- (Gabon) **Alexander N'Doumbou**
- (Guadeloupe) **Alexandre Arenate**
- (Guinea) **Norman Sylla**
- (Guinea) **Dembo Sylla**
- (Guinea) **Ibrahima Sankhon**
- (Indonesia) **Ragnar Oratmangoen**
- (Iran) **Alireza Jahanbakhsh**
- (Italy) Ignazio Cocchiere
- (Japan) **Kosei Tani**
- (Madagascar) **Younous Oumouri**
- (Nigeria) **Benjamin Fredrick**
- (North Macedonia) **David Toshevski**
- (Poland) **Marcin Zewlakow**
- (Rwanda) **Henri Munyaneza**
- (Slovakia) **David Hrnčár**
- (Suriname) **Dennis Baino**
- (Turkey) **Tiago Çukur**
