= René Carcan =

Belgian engraver and sculptor

René Carcan (25 May 1925 – 1993) was a prominent Belgian engraver and sculptor, who studied under Léon Devos, Jacques Maes and Johnny Friedlaender. His works have been showcased at numerous international exhibitions including Galerie La Proue, and are closely associated with the work of Graciela Rodo Boulanger, who was also in the Friedlaender school.

== Life ==
Carcan was born in Saint-Josse-ten-Noode. He studied at the Académie Royale des Beaux-Arts and Saint-Josse-ten-Noode. His main sculpting study was under D. Jacobs.

He developed an artistic style which has been compared to Henri Matisse's; of distilling a vision to an essential essence. His use of colour was influenced by Wassily Kandinsky and Paul Klee.

A museum was established in Brussels at the site of Carcan's old studio, the Fondation René Carcan (Rue Champ-de-Roi 122, Etterbeek), for the preservation and study of his life's works. This was both a museum and a foundation, which exhibited works of his lithography, sculpting and jewellery design, until it closed in 2006.

The Fondation René Carcan subsequently became the Espace René Carcan and established the "René Carcan International Prize for Printmaking," intended to encourage printmaking. The first edition of this biennial award took place in 2014.

He died in Etterbeek, Belgium.
