= Le Chat =

- Main character with the series logo

Publication information
- Publisher: Casterman (Belgium)
- First appearance: Le Soir (March 22, 1983)
- Created by: Philippe Geluck

Le Chat (Le Cat in English-language editions) is a Belgian comic strip, created by Philippe Geluck. Foremost published daily in the newspaper Le Soir from March 22, 1983, until March 23, 2013, it is since issued directly as complete albums.

Right from the start, it quickly became one of the bestselling Franco-Belgian comics series and the mascot of Le Soir. While virtually an icon in Francophone Belgium, he is far less well known in Flanders.

== Concept ==
Le Chat is an adult, human-sized obese, anthropomorphic cat who typically wears a suit. He always has the same physical expression. He often comes up with elaborate reasonings which lead to hilariously absurd conclusions e.g. by taking metaphors literally or by adding increasingly unlikely what-ifs to ordinary situations.

One page in length, it appeared weekly in the "Victor" supplement of Belgian newspaper Le Soir. For Le Chat's 20th anniversary in 2003, Le Soir allowed Geluck to illustrate that day's entire newspaper. An exhibition of Le Chat's history (and that of his creator), "Le Chat s'expose", was first held at the Autoworld Motor Museum in Brussels in Spring 2004, and has since toured Europe. In March–October 2006 it appeared at Les Champs Libres in Rennes.

== In popular culture ==
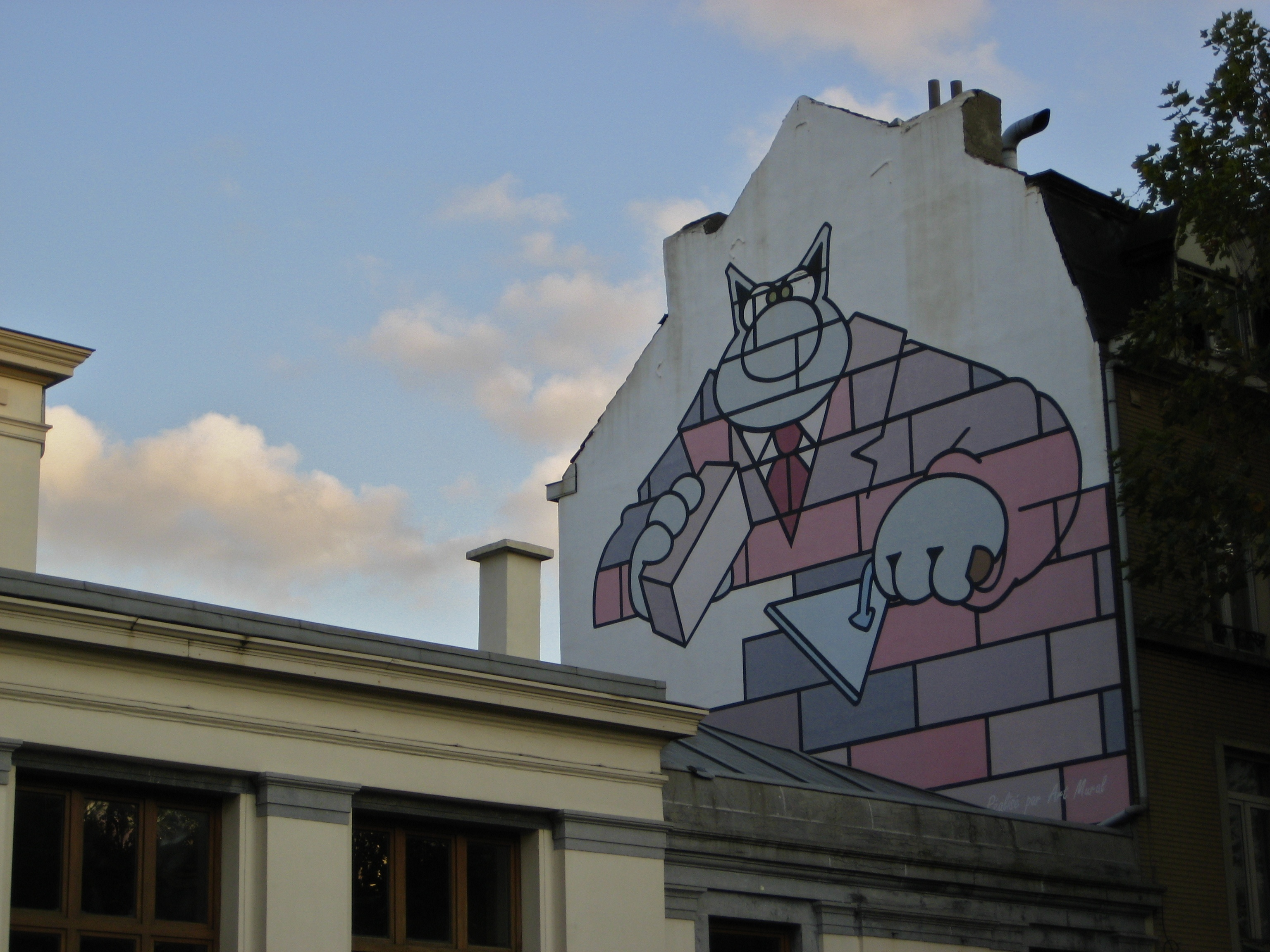
The Brussels' Comic Book Route mural dedicated to Le Chat.

As part of the Brussels' Comic Book Route a wall in the Zuidlaan/Boulevard du Midi in Brussels was dedicated to "Le Chat" in August 1993.

On October 11, 2008, Le Chat received his own market place in Hotton in the Belgian province Luxembourg. A statue of him, sculpted by François Deboucq, was placed in the center, depicting him holding an umbrella which rains water down from inside.

In 2015, "Le Chat" received his own museum.

== Bibliography ==
1. Le Chat, 2001
2. Le Retour du Chat, 2001
3. La Vengeance du Chat, 2002
4. Le Quatrième Chat, 2002
5. Le Chat au Congo, 2003
6. Ma langue au Chat, 2004
7. Le Chat à Malibu, 2005
8. Le Chat 1999,9999, 1999
9. L'Avenir du Chat, 1999
10. Le Chat est content, 2000
11. L'Affaire le Chat, 2001 (Available in English as "The Cat's travels" in 2010)
12. Et vous, chat va?, 2003
13. Le Chat a encore frappé, 2005
14. La Marque du Chat, 2007
15. Une Vie de Chat, 2008
16. Le Chat, Acte XVI, 2010
17. Le Meilleur du Chat, 1994 (Available in English as "God save the Cat" in 2008)
18. L'Excellent du Chat, 1996
19. Le Succulent du Chat, 1999
20. Entrechats, 1999
21. Le Top du Chat, 2009
22. La Rumba du Chat, 2019
23. Le Chat est parmi nous, 2020
24. Le Chat déambule, 2021

== Sources ==
- Gaumer, Patrick (2010). "Chat (Le)". Dictionnaire mondial de la BD (in French). Paris: Éditions Larousse. ISBN 978-2035843319.
