= Jo Christiaens =

Belgian football manager (born 1988)

Personal information
- Date of birth: 17 April 1988 (age 38)
- Place of birth: Belgium
- Height: 1.88 m (6 ft 2 in)
- Position: Centre-back

Team information
- Current team: Hasselt (head coach)

Youth career
- Westerlo

Senior career*
Years	Team	Apps	(Gls)
2008–2010	Westerlo	3	(0)
2010–2017	ASV Geel	212	(23)
2017–2018	Oosterwijk	10	(1)
2018–2020	Thes Sport	52	(2)
Total		277	(26)

Managerial career
- 2020–2022: Turnhout
- 2022–2023: Heist
- 2023–2024: Lierse Kempenzonen
- 2024–2025: Dessel
- 2025–: Hasselt
- * Club domestic league appearances and goals

Jo Christiaens (born 17 April 1988) is a Belgian professional football coach and a former player who played as a defender. He is the manager of Challenger Pro League club Hasselt.

== Managerial career ==
Having retired at the end of the 2019–20 season, Christiaens was appointed head coach of KFC Turnhout on 5 March 2020 for the 2020–21 season.
