= Sporting Hasselt =

Belgian football club

- Full name: Koninklijke Sporting Hasselt
- Founded: 2001; 25 years ago
- Ground: Stedelijk Sportstadion Hasselt, Hasselt
- Capacity: 8,800
- Chairman: Sam Kerkhofs & Rik Verheye
- Manager: Jo Christiaens
- League: Challenger Pro League
- 2025–26: Division 1 VV, 1st of 18 (promoted)
Home colours	Away colours

Koninklijke Sporting Hasselt, known simply as Sporting Hasselt are a Belgian football team based in Hasselt, capital of the Limburg province, Belgium. They compete in Challenger Pro League, second tier of Belgian football from 2026–27 after promotion from Belgian Division 1 in 2025–26.

== History ==
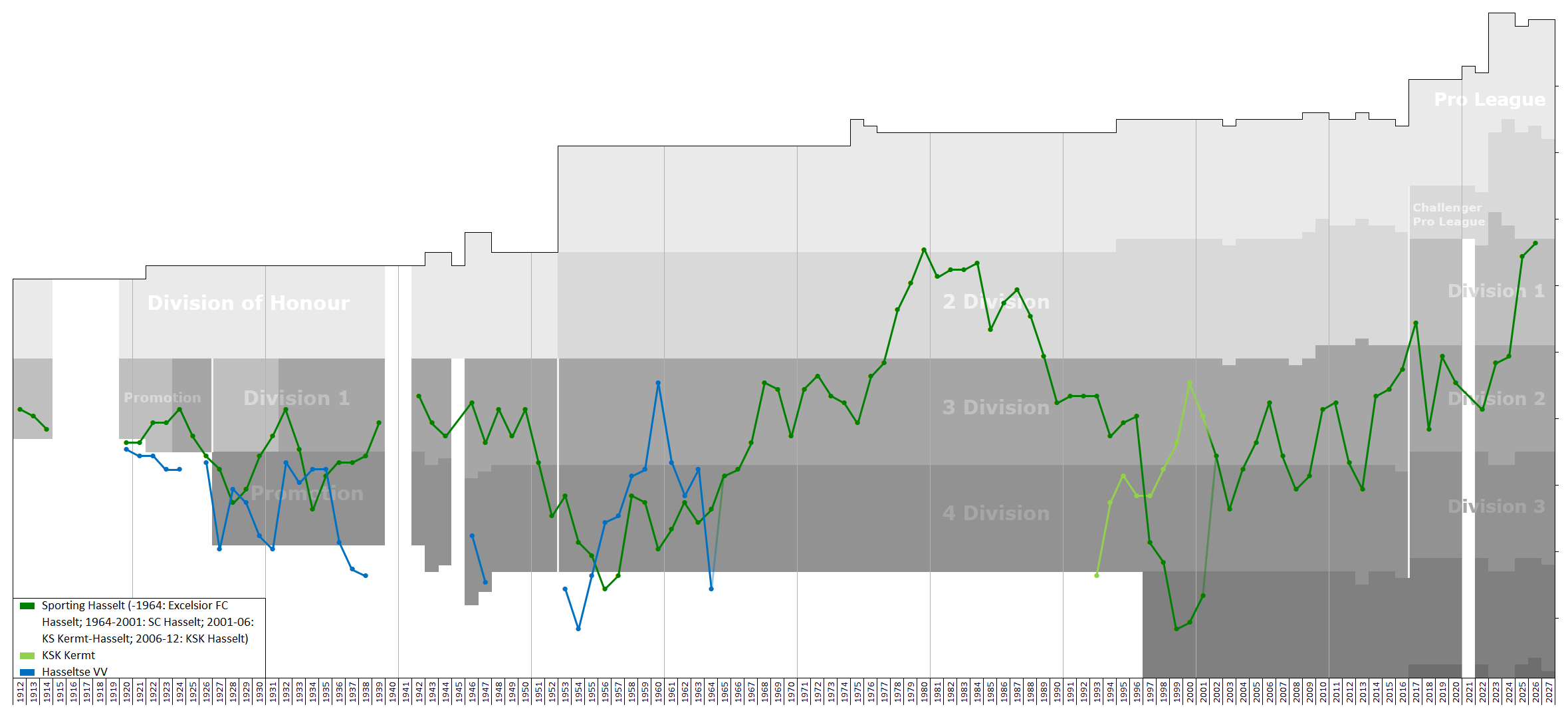
Historical chart of Sporting Hasselt league performance

The club was first founded in 1926 but merged in 2001 with Kermt and was refounded as KSK Hasselt-Kermt.

In 2023–24, Sporting Hasselt secure promotion to Belgian National Division 1 from next season after finishing runner-up in Belgian Division 2 VV B.

In 2025–26, Sporting Hasselt secured promotion to the Challenger Pro League for the first time in their history after winning the Belgian Division 1 VV. Initially, the club was denied a professional licence required for the club to be promoted, but a licence was obtained on appeal.

== Honours ==
- Belgian Division 1
  - Champions (1): 2025–26
- Belgian Division 2
  - Runner-up (1): 2023–24

== Current squad ==
As of 25 September 2026

Note: Flags indicate national team as defined under FIFA eligibility rules; some limited exceptions apply. Players may hold more than one non-FIFA nationality.

No.	Pos.	Nation	Player
3	DF	GUI	Cheick Thiam
4	DF	BEL	Jérémie Mugabo
5	DF	BEL	Lucca Lucker
6	MF	BEL	Niels Verburgh
7	MF	BEL	Geoffry Hairemans
8	DF	BEL	Loïc Masscho
9	FW	BEL	Siebe Van Keymolen
10	MF	BEL	Mehdi Bounou
11	FW	BEL	Livio Milts
13	MF	BEL	Ryan Sanusi
14	FW	BEL	Nicolas Orye
15	DF	BEL	Andres Labie
17	MF	BEL	Lucas Vankerkhoven
18	FW	BEL	Javan Ngoyi

No.	Pos.	Nation	Player
22	DF	BEL	Mathisse Dassen
23	MF	BEL	Nicolas Gerits
24	DF	BEL	Jarno Jourquin
27	GK	BEL	Milo Roekaerts
29	FW	BEL	Wilson Da Costa
30	MF	BEL	Robbe Haven
31	GK	BEL	Lars Geluykens
37	DF	BEL	Japhet Muanza
55	FW	BEL	Tuur Dierckx
74	DF	BEL	Ethan Butera
80	MF	BEL	Alain Matoka
97	FW	BEL	Lino Decresson
99	GK	BEL	Leonardo Cascio
—	GK	BEL	Joren Op De Beeck
