= Brand piracy =

Brand piracy is the act of naming a product in a manner which can result in confusion with other better known brands. According to author Robert Tönnis The term brand piracy is unauthorized usage of protected brand names, labels, designs or description of trade. Annika Kristin states "brand Piracy is considered to be the premeditated use of registered trademark, its name, its tradename or the packaging and presentation of its products". It is a major loss to MNEs around the world as it causes a loss of revenue and image of the brand.

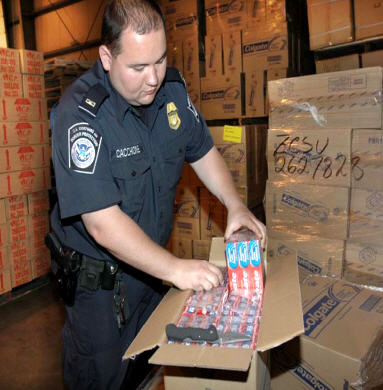
Counterfeit toothpaste

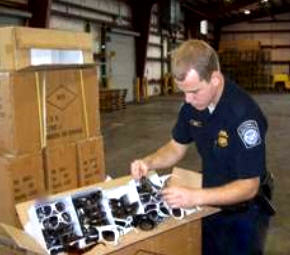
Counterfeit sunglasses

Tönnis describes the consequence of brand piracy as the consumption of fake, untested and poor quality goods by consumers. This can damage the reputation of brands and even result in damage to people's health. In 2012 the CBP promised to protect the economy, the people of the US and their national security "against harm from counterfeit and pirated goods".

== Examples ==
Examples for imitation and counterfeiting of branded products have been noted as early as 1912.

- Louis Vuitton had to fight for its brand image after consumers (mistakenly) lost interest in them due to the availability of cheap counterfeits.
- Forged Rolex watches can be purchased for a fraction of the original's price in many places of the world.
- In Mexico Cartier have had to fight the piracy of their own brand.
- Benetton, Levi Strauss & Co. and Lacoste have all been victims of counterfeiting in which the label has been altered of an obviously inferior product.
- Examples of Coalgate (as against Colgate), Del Mundo (instead of Del Monte), as well as knockoff Sharpie markers branded under fake names such as "Sharpei", "Sherpie", "Shoupie", or "Skerple" all fall into the category of piracy where the product is different but the trademark looks the same.
- The music industry claims that brand piracy causes a loss of US$4.6 Billion in market share alone. It also states that 7 out of 10 CDs sold around the world are pirated.

== Consequences ==
- Loss of revenue of billions of dollars for the original manufacturers.
- Damage to the reputation of the authentic products and their manufacturers.
- It acts as a barrier to the entry of trademark owners to those markets where their brands are pirated.
- It closes off competition as competitors first get attracted by the high price margin being enjoyed by the original and then have to wage a price war against low price counterfeiters.

Over the last decade, the counterfeiting and piracy phenomenon has risen to very dangerous dimensions and has become one of the most devastating problems facing world business.

— European Commission– Official Homepage

== Strategies for handling brand piracy ==
While some experts suggest the company to go the extremes of punishing the counterfeiter, others also suggest takeover or franchisee agreements with them. Some other authors suggest web based web crawlers that can identify and delete any promotional material that infringes with the product of the company. Some authors suggest recourse to legal action and a study of legal protections available in those markets where Piracy is prevalent. Since 1977 obvious plagiarism in regards to established design is also exposed in public by awarding the negative prize Plagiarius.
