= 2024–25 Belgian Pro League =

121st season of top-tier football in Belgium

Belgian Pro League
- Season: 2024–25
- Dates: 26 July 2024 – 29 May 2025
- Champions: Union SG; 12th title
- Relegated: Beerschot; Kortrijk
- Champions League: Union SG; Club Brugge
- Europa League: Genk; Anderlecht
- Conference League: Charleroi
- Matches: 292
- Goals: 839 (2.87 per match)
- Top goalscorer: Tolu Arokodare; Adriano Bertaccini (21 goals each)

The 2024–25 Belgian Pro League (officially known as the Jupiler Pro League due to sponsorship reasons) was the 122nd season of top-tier football in Belgium.

== Teams ==
Beerschot and Dender EH were promoted respectively as champions and runners-up of the 2023–24 Challenger Pro League. Beerschot returned to the top level after just two seasons, while Dender EH needed 15 seasons to return (including four seasons playing at the third level). They replaced Eupen and RWD Molenbeek who were relegated at the end of the previous season.

=== Stadiums and locations ===
Locations of the 2024–25 Belgian Pro League teams

Matricule	Club	Location	Venue	Capacity
35	Anderlecht	Anderlecht, Brussels	Lotto Park	21,500
1	Antwerp	Antwerp	Bosuilstadion	16,144
13	Beerschot	Antwerp	Olympisch Stadion	12,771
12	Cercle Brugge	Bruges	Jan Breydel Stadium	29,042
22	Charleroi	Charleroi	Stade du Pays de Charleroi	14,000
3	Club Brugge	Bruges	Jan Breydel Stadium	29,042
3900	Dender EH	Denderleeuw	Van Roystadion	6,429
322	Genk	Genk	Cegeka Arena	24,956
7	Gent	Ghent	Planet Group Arena	20,000
19	Kortrijk	Kortrijk	Guldensporen Stadion	9,399
25	Mechelen	Mechelen	AFAS-stadion Achter de Kazerne	16,700
18	OH Leuven	Leuven	Den Dreef	10,000
373	Sint-Truiden	Sint-Truiden	Stayen	14,600
16	Standard Liège	Liège	Stade Maurice Dufrasne	30,023
10	Union SG	Forest, Brussels	Stade Joseph Marien	9,400
2024	Westerlo	Westerlo	Het Kuipje	8,035

=== Number of teams by area ===
#	Province or region	Team(s)
4	Antwerp	Antwerp, Beerschot, Mechelen and Westerlo
3	West Flanders	Cercle Brugge, Club Brugge and Kortrijk
2	Brussels	Anderlecht and Union SG
2	East Flanders	Dender EH and Gent
2	Limburg	Genk and Sint-Truiden
1	Flemish Brabant	Oud-Heverlee Leuven
1	Liège	Standard Liège
1	Hainaut	Charleroi

=== Personnel and kits ===
Club	Manager	Captain	Kit Manufacturer	Shirt sponsors (front)	Shirt sponsors (back)	Shirt sponsors (sleeve)	Shorts sponsor
Anderlecht	(Kosovo) Besnik Hasi (Note: Brian Riemer was the manager for matchdays 1 through 7, David Hubert managed the club for matchdays 8 through 30.)	(Belgium) Jan Vertonghen	Joma	Napoleon Sports & Casino	None	None	None
Antwerp	(Netherlands) Andries Ulderink (Note: Jonas De Roeck was the manager for matchdays 1 through 28.)	(Belgium) Toby Alderweireld	Jako	betFIRST	Heylen Vastgoed, Ghelamco	AntwerpFirst, betFIRST	None
Beerschot	(Netherlands) Dirk Kuyt	(Belgium) Ryan Sanusi	Erreà	Star Casino, Wolf Lubricants	Yelo Rent a Car, Mystershirt	Wolf Lubricants	Yelo Rent a Car, Green House Solutions
Cercle Brugge	(Germany) Bernd Storck (Note: Miron Muslic was the manager for matchdays 1 through 16, Jimmy De Wulf acted as caretaker manager on matchday 17, and Ferdinand Feldhofer was the manager for the rest of the regular season. Jimmy De Wulf then managed the club during the relegation playoffs, leaving the Promotion/relegation play-offs for Storck.)	(Belgium) Thibo Somers	Kappa	Golden Palace Casino Sports, Volvo Automobilia	Liantis, Callant Insurance	Golden Palace Casino Sports	Autoverhuur Meerschaert, Rodenbach
Charleroi	(Belgium) Rik De Mil	(Algeria) Adem Zorgane	Kipsta	Unibet, R-Aqua, Cairox	QNT Sport	None	UMons
Club Brugge	(Belgium) Nicky Hayen	(Belgium) Hans Vanaken	Castore	Unibet	Allianz	Unibet	None
Dender EH	(Belgium) Vincent Euvrard	(Belgium) Lennard Hens	Jako	Star Casino, Valckenier	None	None	None
Genk	(Germany) Thorsten Fink	(Belgium) Bryan Heynen	Nike	Beobank, ITZU Foreign	Wilms NV, Carglass	ACEG	Cegeka, Carglass
Gent	(Bosnia and Herzegovina) Danijel Milićević (caretaker) (Note: Wouter Vrancken was the manager for matchdays 1 through 22.)	(Belgium) Sven Kums	Craft	Bâloise/Hamann International Logistics (in UEFA matches)	Circus Belgium, Vdk bank	Hyundai	APF Autoparts, Vdk bank
Kortrijk	(Germany) Bernd Storck (Note: Freyr Alexandersson was the manager for matchdays 1 through 18, Yves Vanderhaeghe managed the club for matchdays 19 through 26.) (Note: After conclusion of the relegation play-offs, with Kortrijk relegated and their season over, Bernd Storck took charge of Cercle Brugge who still needed to play promotion/relegation play-offs, hence Storck is listed as manager of both Cercle Brugge and Kortrijk at the end of the season.)	(Portugal) João Silva	Erreà	AGO Jobs & HR, Unibet	Brustor, EARTH Solar Solution, Caps Fuel Card	NOVY	Unibet, Caps Fuel Card
Mechelen	(Belgium) Frederik Vanderbiest (caretaker) (Note: Besnik Hasi was the manager for matchdays 1 through 28.)	(Belgium) Rob Schoofs	Erreà	Telenet, Groep Verelst, Play Sports, AFAS Software	AFAS Software, EnergyKing	Golden Palace Casino Sports	Arco Information, Golden Palace Casino Sports
OH Leuven	(Wales) Chris Coleman (Note: Óscar García was the manager for matchdays 1 through 14, Hans Somers was caretaker manager on matchdays 15 and 16.)	(Belgium) Mathieu Maertens	Stanno	Star Casino	Banqup, Tegel Concept	Star Casino	None
Sint-Truiden	(Belgium) Wouter Vrancken (Note: Christian Lattanzio was the manager for matchdays 1 through 6, Felice Mazzù was the manager for the rest of the regular competition (matchdays 7-30) and the first two matchdays of the relegation playoffs, Frédéric De Meyer was caretaker manager for the third match of the relegation playoffs.)	(Belgium) Bruno Godeau	Olympic Sportswear	Maruhan, DMM.com, Oliverhood, Crafty Inc.	Sint Truiden	Asahi Kasei, Maruhan	Pauli Beton, SEPTENI, Shin Takarajima Holdings, All Ads Inc.
Standard Liège	(Croatia) Ivan Leko	(Belgium) Arnaud Bodart	Adidas	Circus Belgium	None	None	None
Union SG	(Belgium) Sébastien Pocognoli	(Luxembourg) Anthony Moris	Nike	Loterie Nationale/Hey! Telecom (in UEFA matches)	Hey! Telecom	Cupra	None
Westerlo	(Belgium) Timmy Simons	(Turkey) Sinan Bolat	Nike	Soudal	Casino777, Arma Global	Keukens Vanlommel, Voetbalshop.be	Soloya

=== Managerial changes ===
Team	Outgoing manager	Manner of departure	Date of vacancy	Position	Replaced by	Date of appointment
Gent	(Belgium) Hein Vanhaezebrouck	End of contract	30 June 2024	Pre-season	(Belgium) Wouter Vrancken	5 June 2024
Genk	(Belgium) Domenico Olivieri (Belgium) Michel Ribeiro (Belgium) Eddy Vanhemel	End of caretaker spell	30 June 2024	Pre-season	(Germany) Thorsten Fink	5 June 2024
Westerlo	(Belgium) Bart Goor	End of caretaker spell	30 June 2024	Pre-season	(Belgium) Timmy Simons	23 May 2024 (Note: While the announcement of Timmy Simons's signature at Westerlo was already made on 23 May 2024, Bart Goor remained in charge as caretaker manager for the last match of the season and Simons thus only officially took up the position as soon as the 2023–24 season ended.)
Dender	(Belgium) Timmy Simons	Signed by Westerlo	30 June 2024	Pre-season	(Belgium) Vincent Euvrard	31 May 2024
Antwerp	(Netherlands) Mark van Bommel	End of contract	30 June 2024	Pre-season	(Belgium) Jonas De Roeck	4 June 2024
Sint-Truiden	(Germany) Thorsten Fink	Signed by Genk	30 June 2024	Pre-season	(Italy) Christian Lattanzio	14 June 2024
Union SG	(Germany) Alexander Blessin	Signed by St. Pauli	30 June 2024	Pre-season	(Belgium) Sébastien Pocognoli	7 July 2024
Sint-Truiden	(Italy) Christian Lattanzio	Sacked	3 September 2024	15th	(Belgium) Felice Mazzù	5 September 2024
Anderlecht	(Denmark) Brian Riemer	Sacked	19 September 2024	4th	(Belgium) David Hubert (Note: David Hubert was initially appointed as caretaker manager, but on 10 October 2024 it was confirmed he was appointed as full time manager.)	19 September 2024
OH Leuven	(Spain) Óscar García	Sacked	22 November 2024	13th	(Belgium) Hans Somers (caretaker)	22 November 2024
OH Leuven	(Belgium) Hans Somers (caretaker)	End of caretaker spell	2 December 2024	13th	(Wales) Chris Coleman	2 December 2024 (Note: While the announcement of Chris Coleman's signature at OH Leuven was already made on 30 November 2024, Hans Somers remained in charge as caretaker manager for the upcoming match two days later against Anderlecht and Coleman only officially took up the position the day after that match.)
Cercle Brugge	(Austria) Miron Muslić	Sacked	2 December 2024	15th	(Belgium) Jimmy De Wulf (caretaker)	2 December 2024
Cercle Brugge	(Belgium) Jimmy De Wulf	End of caretaker spell	10 December 2024	15th	(Austria) Ferdinand Feldhofer	10 December 2024
Kortrijk	(Iceland) Freyr Alexandersson	Sacked	17 December 2024	14th	(Belgium) Yves Vanderhaeghe	18 December 2024
Gent	(Belgium) Wouter Vrancken	Mutual consent	21 January 2025	6th	(Bosnia and Herzegovina) Danijel Milićević (caretaker)	21 January 2025
Kortrijk	(Belgium) Yves Vanderhaeghe	Sacked	19 February 2025	15th	(Germany) Bernd Storck	20 February 2025
Antwerp	(Belgium) Jonas De Roeck	Sacked	3 March 2025	5th	(Netherlands) Andries Ulderink	4 March 2025
Mechelen	(Kosovo) Besnik Hasi	Sacked	4 March 2025	10th	(Belgium) Frederik Vanderbiest (caretaker)	4 March 2025
Cercle Brugge	(Austria) Ferdinand Feldhofer	Sacked	17 March 2025	13th	(Belgium) Jimmy De Wulf	21 March 2025
Anderlecht	(Belgium) David Hubert	Replaced	20 March 2025	4th	(Kosovo) Besnik Hasi	20 March 2025
Sint-Truiden	(Belgium) Felice Mazzù	Sacked	10 April 2025	2nd (relegation play-offs)	(Belgium) Frédéric De Meyer (caretaker)	10 April 2025
Sint-Truiden	(Belgium) Frédéric De Meyer (caretaker)	End of caretaker spell	15 April 2025	1st (relegation play-offs)	(Belgium) Wouter Vrancken	15 April 2025
Kortrijk	(Germany) Bernd Storck	Signed by Cercle Brugge	12 May 2025	3rd (relegation play-offs)	not replaced (season ended)	
Cercle Brugge	(Belgium) Jimmy De Wulf	Replaced	12 May 2025	2nd (relegation play-offs)	(Germany) Bernd Storck	12 May 2025

== Regular season ==
=== League table ===
Pos	Team	Pld	W	D	L	GF	GA	GD	Pts	Qualification or relegation
1	Genk	30	21	5	4	55	33	+22	68	Qualification for the Champions' Play-offs (Note: The regular season winner will qualify for the 2025–26 UEFA Europa League if not earning 2025–26 UEFA Champions League in the playoff.)
2	Club Brugge	30	17	8	5	65	36	+29	59	Qualification for the Champions' play-offs
3	Union SG	30	15	10	5	49	25	+24	55	Qualification for the Champions' play-offs
4	Anderlecht	30	15	6	9	50	27	+23	51	Qualification for the Champions' play-offs
5	Antwerp	30	12	10	8	47	32	+15	46	Qualification for the Champions' play-offs
6	Gent	30	11	12	7	41	33	+8	45	Qualification for the Champions' play-offs
7	Standard Liège	30	10	9	11	22	35	−13	39	Qualification for the Europe play-offs
8	Mechelen	30	10	8	12	45	40	+5	38	Qualification for the Europe play-offs
9	Westerlo	30	10	7	13	50	49	+1	37	Qualification for the Europe play-offs
10	Charleroi	30	10	7	13	36	36	0	37	Qualification for the Europe play-offs
11	OH Leuven	30	8	13	9	28	33	−5	37	Qualification for the Europe play-offs
12	Dender EH	30	8	8	14	33	51	−18	32	Qualification for the Europe play-offs
13	Cercle Brugge	30	7	11	12	29	44	−15	32	Qualification for the Relegation play-offs
14	Sint-Truiden	30	7	10	13	41	56	−15	31	Qualification for the Relegation play-offs
15	Kortrijk	30	7	5	18	28	55	−27	26	Qualification for the Relegation play-offs
16	Beerschot	30	3	9	18	26	60	−34	18	Qualification for the Relegation play-offs

Source: Jupiler Pro League (in Dutch), Soccerway
Rules for classification: 1) Points; 2) Matches won; 3) Goal difference; 4) Goals scored; 5) Away matches won; 6) Away goal difference; 7) Away goals scored; 8) Play-off.

=== Positions by round ===
The table lists the positions of teams after the completion of each round, with postponed matches and points deductions only included when occurring. Teams with fewer matches played are shown with their position underlined, with each line representing one fewer match.

- Due to their taking parts in the qualifying rounds for European football, several matches of matchday 5 were postponed: Anderlecht vs Genk and Cercle Brugge vs Gent. The first match was rescheduled for the midweek of 17 September, in between matchdays 7 and 8. The second match was rescheduled for the midweek of 26 September, in between matchdays 8 and 9.

Colored cells refer to being in Champions' Play-offs (green), in Europe Play-offs (blue) or Relegation play-offs (red).

Team ╲ Round	1	2	3	4	5	6	7	8	9	10	11	12	13	14	15	16	17	18	19	20	21	22	23	24	25	26	27	28	29	30
Genk	7	13	9	5	7	5	2	1	1	1	1	1	1	1	1	1	1	1	1	1	1	1	1	1	1	1	1	1	1	1
Club Brugge	6	11	14	13	8	3	1	4	4	5	4	3	2	3	2	2	2	2	2	2	2	2	2	2	2	2	2	2	2	2
Union SG	7	3	8	4	5	8	11	12	8	10	10	10	10	7	9	7	7	6	6	5	3	3	3	3	3	3	3	3	3	3
Anderlecht	4	2	3	1	1	2	4	6	7	4	6	6	5	4	4	4	3	3	3	3	5	4	4	5	4	4	4	4	4	4
Antwerp	2	9	4	6	10	11	8	3	2	2	2	2	3	2	3	3	4	4	4	4	4	5	5	4	5	5	5	5	5	5
Gent	2	9	11	7	11	12	9	2	3	3	3	5	6	5	6	6	5	5	5	6	6	6	7	6	6	6	6	6	6	6
Standard Liège	7	6	7	11	6	10	7	7	9	11	9	9	8	9	8	9	8	9	10	10	8	7	6	7	7	7	7	7	7	7
Mechelen	5	12	13	14	13	9	12	9	11	8	5	4	4	6	5	5	6	7	7	8	10	10	11	12	13	10	10	10	9	8
Westerlo	1	1	1	2	2	4	5	8	6	6	8	8	7	8	7	8	9	10	11	12	13	13	13	13	10	12	13	13	10	9
Charleroi	13	7	5	8	3	7	3	5	5	9	11	12	13	10	11	10	10	12	8	7	9	8	8	8	8	8	8	8	8	10
OH Leuven	7	3	6	10	9	6	10	10	12	14	12	11	12	13	13	13	12	11	12	11	11	12	12	10	12	9	9	9	11	11
Dender EH	7	5	2	3	4	1	6	11	10	7	7	7	9	12	10	11	11	8	9	9	7	9	9	11	9	11	11	11	12	12
Cercle Brugge	16	16	10	12	14	14	15	15	14	15	15	15	11	14	15	15	15	15	13	13	12	11	10	9	11	13	12	12	13	13
Sint-Truiden	13	15	16	16	15	15	14	13	13	13	14	14	15	11	12	12	13	13	15	14	14	14	14	14	14	14	14	14	14	14
Kortrijk	13	8	12	9	12	13	13	14	15	12	13	13	14	15	15	14	14	14	14	15	15	15	15	15	15	15	15	15	15	15
Beerschot	7	13	15	15	16	16	16	16	16	16	16	16	16	16	16	16	16	16	16	16	16	16	16	16	16	16	16	16	16	16

Source: vbal4.be

=== Results ===
Home \ Away	GNK	CLU	USG	AND	ANT	GNT	STA	MEC	WES	CHA	OHL	DEN	CER	STR	KOR	BEE
Genk		3–2	2–1	2–0	2–0	0–0	0–0	2–1	1–0	3–0	2–0	4–0	2–1	3–2	3–2	1–0
Club Brugge	2–0		1–1	2–1	1–0	2–4	1–2	1–1	4–3	4–2	1–0	4–1	3–0	7–0	1–1	4–2
Union SG	4–0	2–2		0–0	2–1	0–0	3–0	0–1	3–1	1–0	1–0	4–1	1–3	2–1	3–0	3–1
Anderlecht	0–2 (Note: The match Anderlecht-Genk of matchday 5 (23 August) was postponed to 17 September (between matchdays 7 and 8) due to Anderlecht taking part in the qualifying rounds for European football.)	0–3	0–2		2–0	6–0	3–0	4–1	2–2	0–0	1–1	2–3	3–0	1–0	4–0	2–1
Antwerp	2–2	2–1	2–0	1–2		0–1	3–0	0–1	3–2	1–3	2–2	1–1	3–0	6–1	2–1	5–0 (Note: The match Antwerp-Beerschot of matchday 9 (29 September) was abandoned at a score of 4–0 with 75 minutes played as the away fans kept throwing flares on the pitch. As per the rules of the Pro League, the match would have been continued behind closed doors on 30 September or 1 October, but Beerschot decided to forfeit the match, handing Antwerp a 5–0 win. On 30 September, the Pro League fined Beerschot 50.000 € for the irregularities and on 4 October 2024 the Prosecutor's Office of the Belgian FA also fined the club an additional 10.000 €, and additionally prohibited Beerschot from bringing away fans in their three next away fixtures (at Kortrijk, Mechelen, and Anderlecht).)
Gent	0–2	1–1	1–3	1–0	1–1		5–0	2–0	4–1	1–1	3–0	1–2	1–1	2–0	1–2	3–2
Standard Liège	1–2	1–0	0–0	0–2	0–0	0–1		0–0	1–2	2–1	1–1	1–0	1–0	2–1	1–0	1–0
Mechelen	1–2	1–2	1–1	1–3	1–1	3–3	0–0		2–4	5–2	5–0	2–1	2–0	1–1	3–0	3–0
Westerlo	1–2	1–2	4–3	2–0	1–2	2–2	4–2	1–1		1–3	1–1	2–0	3–0	1–2	4–0	2–2
Charleroi	1–1	1–1	1–2	0–1	0–1	1–0	1–1	0–1	1–0		0–2	5–0	1–1	2–1	1–0	3–0
OH Leuven	3–1	0–1	1–1	0–0	1–1	0–0	2–0	1–0	0–0	1–0		3–2	1–1	3–2	1–1	2–0
Dender EH	0–1	1–2	0–0	1–1	1–3	0–0	0–2	2–5	1–0	1–0	1–1		0–1	2–1	4–1	0–0
Cercle Brugge	2–3	1–3	0–0	0–5	0–0	2–1 (Note: The match Cercle Brugge-Gent of matchday 5 (24 August) was postponed to 26 September (between matchdays 8 and 9) due to both clubs taking part in the qualifying rounds for European football.)	1–1	1–0	1–1	2–0	1–0	0–0		1–1	1–2	4–1
Sint-Truiden	2–2	2–2	0–0	0–2	1–1	1–1	1–2	2–1	2–0	1–4	2–1	3–3	1–1		4–2	2–0
Kortrijk	2–1	0–3	1–2	0–2	1–2	0–1	1–0	3–1	1–2	0–1	2–0	0–3	1–1	1–1		1–0
Beerschot	3–4	2–2	0–4	2–1	1–1	0–0	0–0	1–0	1–2	1–1	0–0	1–2	3–2	0–3	2–2	

Updated to match(es) played on 16 March 2025. Source: Kalender Pro League 2024-25
Legend: Blue = home team win; Yellow = draw; Red = away team win.

== Play-offs ==
=== Champions' play-offs ===
The champions' play-offs decided the overall league champion. The top six teams of the regular season qualified and played a round-robin tournament, with each team starting with half the points obtained during the regular season. The starting points were rounded up, and in case of ties in standings at the end of the champions' play-offs, any half points gained at the start were deducted first.

The points of Club Brugge, Union SG, Anderlecht and Gent were rounded up, and thus in the event of a tie on points, Genk and Antwerp would always be ranked ahead of those four teams. The teams finishing in the top three positions after conclusion of the champions' play-offs qualified for European football, with the team in position four facing the winner of the Europe play-offs for the final ticket, unless the winner of the Belgian Cup finished in one of the top four positions, in which case the fifth team took part instead.

Pos	Team	Pld	W	D	L	GF	GA	GD	Pts	Qualification or relegation	USG	CLU	GNK	AND	ANT	GNT
1	Union SG (C)	10	9	1	0	22	3	+19	56	Qualification for the Champions League league phase		0–0	1–0	2–0	5–1	3–1
2	Club Brugge	10	7	2	1	21	6	+15	53	Qualification for the Champions League third qualifying round	0–1		1–0	2–0	1–1	4–1
3	Genk	10	4	1	5	14	11	+3	47	Qualification for the Europa League play-off round (Note: Club Brugge won the 2024–25 Belgian Cup and qualified for the Champions League through finishing second, the Europa League play-off round berth was therefore transferred to regular season winners Genk.)	1–2	0–2		2–1	0–1	4–0
4	Anderlecht	10	3	1	6	12	13	−1	36	Qualification for the Europa League second qualifying round	0–1	1–3	1–2		0–0	5–0
5	Antwerp	10	2	3	5	10	18	−8	32	Qualification for the European competition play-off	0–4	2–3	1–1	1–3		0–1
6	Gent	10	1	0	9	4	32	−28	26		0–3	0–5	1–4	0–1	0–3	

Source: Jupiler Pro League (in Dutch), Soccerway
Legend: Blue = home team win; Yellow = draw; Red = away team win.
Rules for classification: 1) Points; 2) Points without (possible) half points added due to rounding; 3) Regular season finishing position.
(C) Champions

=== Europe play-offs ===
The Europe play-offs were played by the teams in positions 7 through 12 at the conclusion of the regular season. Teams played a round-robin tournament, with each team starting with half the points obtained during the regular season. The starting points were rounded up, and in case of ties in standings at the end of the Europe play-offs, any half points gained at the start were deducted first.

The points of Standard, Westerlo, Charleroi and OH Leuven were rounded up, and thus in the event of a tie on points, Mechelen and Dender EH would always be ranked ahead of those three teams.

The winner of the Europe play-offs faced the team finishing fourth in the champions' play-offs to decide which team qualified for European football.

Pos	Team	Pld	W	D	L	GF	GA	GD	Pts	Qualification or relegation	CHA	WES	MEC	DEN	STA	OHL
1	Charleroi (O)	10	6	3	1	19	10	+9	40	Qualification for the European competition play-off		4–3	3–0	4–1	1–0	2–1
2	Westerlo	10	3	5	2	19	16	+3	33		2–2		2–2	4–2	0–0	2–2
3	Mechelen	10	2	6	2	17	17	0	31		1–1	2–3		5–2	0–0	1–1
4	Dender EH	10	3	4	3	20	21	−1	29		2–1	1–0	2–2		1–1	5–0
5	Standard Liège	10	0	7	3	5	8	−3	27		0–1	1–1	2–2	0–0		0–1
6	OH Leuven	10	1	5	4	11	19	−8	27		0–0	0–2	1–2	4–4	1–1	

Source: Jupiler Pro League (in Dutch), Soccerway
Legend: Blue = home team win; Yellow = draw; Red = away team win.
Rules for classification: 1) Points; 2) Points without (possible) half points added due to rounding; 3) Regular season finishing position.
(O) Play-off winners

=== European competition play-off ===
A single match was played between Antwerp, the fifth place finisher of the Champions' play-offs, and Charleroi, the winner of the Europe play-offs, with home advantage to the team from the Champions' play-offs. The winner qualified for European football.

Normally the fourth team of the champions' play-offs would have faced the winner of the Europe play-offs, but as Club Brugge won the 2024–25 Belgian Cup on 4 May 2025 and was already guaranteed of finishing in the top four, instead the fifth-placed team of the champions' play-offs faced Charleroi.

29 May 2025
18:30 CEST

Antwerp	1–2	Charleroi
Bayo 86'	Report	Keita 67'; Guiagon 90+5'

Bosuilstadion, Antwerp
Attendance: 14,008
Referee: Erik Lambrechts

=== Relegation play-offs ===
The bottom four teams after the regular season played the relegation play-offs, a round-robin tournament in which they started with the full points obtained during the regular season. The teams finishing in third and fourth at the conclusion of the relegation play-offs were relegated to the 2025–26 Challenger Pro League, and the team finishing in second place had to play the winner of the promotion play-offs, with the winner of that match playing in the 2025–26 Belgian Pro League.

Pos	Team	Pld	W	D	L	GF	GA	GD	Pts	Qualification or relegation	STR	CER	KOR	BEE
1	Sint-Truiden	6	3	1	2	9	10	−1	41			3–1	0–3	2–1
2	Cercle Brugge (O)	6	2	1	3	10	13	−3	39	Qualification for the promotion/relegation play-offs	3–1		0–2	2–1
3	Kortrijk (R)	6	3	2	1	12	8	+4	37	Relegation to Challenger Pro League	2–2	2–2		3–2
4	Beerschot (R)	6	2	0	4	10	10	0	24	Relegation to Challenger Pro League	0–1	4–2	2–0	

Source: Jupiler Pro League (in Dutch), Soccerway
Legend: Blue = home team win; Yellow = draw; Red = away team win.
Rules for classification: 1) Points; 2) Regular season finishing position.
(O) Play-off winners; (R) Relegated

=== Promotion/relegation play-offs ===
The promotion/relegation play-offs are contested by the four highest eligible finishers not already promoted directly. Normally this would be the teams in positions 3 to 6 in the 2024–25 Challenger Pro League, but as Club NXT (6th, U23-team) was ineligible, Lokeren-Temse (7th) took the final spot. At the time the play-offs started however, Lokeren-Temse had not been awarded a license to play at the highest level for the coming season which would have made them ineligible to compete. The club launched an appeal against this decision however which meant that the negative license decision was suspended and they could take part. Should the appeal however be rejected, the club will not be able to promote. These four teams meet in a knockout tournament with both quarter-finals and semi-finals over two legs, and the highest season finisher always having home advantage in the return leg. The winner of the semi-finals will play the 14th place finisher of the 2024–25 Belgian Pro League over two legs. The Belgian Pro League team will have home advantage in the return leg; the winner of the final will qualify to play in the 2025–26 Belgian Pro League, with the loser playing in the 2025–26 Challenger Pro League.

==== Bracket ====
Quarter-finals
7	Lokeren-Temse	2	2	4
3	RWD Molenbeek	0	3	3
5	Patro Eisden Maasmechelen	3	2	5
4	Beveren	2	1	3

Semi-finals
7	Lokeren-Temse	1	1	2
5	Patro Eisden Maasmechelen	2	1	3

Finals
14	Cercle Brugge	5	3	8
5	Patro Eisden Maasmechelen	1	1	2

==== Quarter-finals ====
24 April 2025
20:30 CEST

Lokeren-Temse	2–0	RWD Molenbeek
Preijs 10' (o.g.); Vinck 14'	Report

Daknamstadion, Lokeren
Attendance: 2,676
Referee: Massimiliano Ledda
27 April 2025
19:15 CEST

RWD Molenbeek	3–2	Lokeren-Temse
Biron 34' (pen.); Sapata 53'; Robail 71'	Report	Nainggolan 85'; Ntamack 88'

Edmond Machtens Stadium, Molenbeek-Saint-Jean
Attendance: 2,869
Referee: Klass Clerkx

Lokeren-Temse won 4–3 on aggregate.

24 April 2025
20:30 CEST

Patro Eisden Maasmechelen	3–2	Beveren
Kiankaulua 25'; Abid 40', 51'; Kis (yellow card) 49' (yellow-red card) 70'	Report	Mertens 38'; Jans 71'

Patro Stadion, Maasmechelen
Attendance: 1,011
Referee: Wesli De Cremer
27 April 2025
19:15 CEST

Beveren	1–2	Patro Eisden Maasmechelen
Brüls (red card) 32'; Mertens 86'	Report	Kiankaulua 33'; Peeters 56'

Freethiel Stadion, Beveren
Attendance: 4,346
Referee: Kevin Van Damme

Patro Eisden Maasmechelen won 5–3 on aggregate.

==== Semi-finals ====
3 May 2025
16:00 CEST

Lokeren-Temse	1–2	Patro Eisden Maasmechelen
Ntamack 63' (pen.)	Report	Bammens 34', 78'

Daknamstadion, Lokeren
Attendance: 5,062
Referee: Bert Verbeke
11 May 2025
16:00 CEST

Patro Eisden Maasmechelen	1–1	Lokeren-Temse
Kis 38' (pen.), (yellow card) 45+2' (yellow-red card) 64'	Report	Brebels 5'; Boonen (red card) 79'

Patro Stadion, Maasmechelen
Attendance: 2,385
Referee: Nathan Verboomen

Patro Eisden Maasmechelen won 3–2 on aggregate.

==== Finals ====
18 May 2025
19:15 CEST

Patro Eisden Maasmechelen	1–5	Cercle Brugge
Mabanza 90+3'	Report	Agyekum 8'; Brunner 25', 51'; Felipe Augusto 58'; Somers 84'

Patro Stadion, Maasmechelen
Attendance: 5,000
Referee: Nicolas Laforge
23 May 2025
20:45 CEST

Cercle Brugge	3–1	Patro Eisden Maasmechelen
Nazinho 5'; Felipe Augusto 24' (pen.); Nunes 78'	Report	Van Landschoot 67'

Jan Breydel Stadium, Brugge
Attendance: 7,932
Referee: Wim Smet

Cercle Brugge won 8–2 on aggregate.

== Season statistics ==
Despite teams not playing the same number of matches due to the play-offs, goals during the play-offs do count in determining the top scorer.

=== Top goalscorers ===
Rank	Player	Club	Goals
1	(Belgium) Adriano Bertaccini	Sint-Truiden	21
1	(Nigeria) Tolu Arokodare	Genk	21
3	(Denmark) Kasper Dolberg	Anderlecht	18
4	(Canada) Promise David	Union SG	17
5	(Serbia) Nikola Štulić	Charleroi	16
6	(Croatia) Franjo Ivanović	Union SG	15
6	(Greece) Christos Tzolis	Club Brugge	15
8	(Suriname) Tjaronn Chery	Antwerp	14
8	(Belgium) Daan Heymans	Charleroi	14
10	(Belgium) Benito Raman	Mechelen	13
10	(Croatia) Matija Frigan	Westerlo	13

==== Hat-tricks ====
Player	For	Against	Result	Date
(Sweden) Jacob Ondrejka	Antwerp	Sint-Truiden	6–1 (H)	11 August 2024
(Denmark) Kasper Dolberg	Anderlecht	Cercle Brugge	0–5 (A)	10 November 2024
(Greece) Christos Tzolis^{4}	Club Brugge	Sint-Truiden	7–0 (H)	23 November 2024
(Denmark) Kasper Dolberg^{4}	Anderlecht	Cercle Brugge	5–0 (H)	23 April 2025

Note: ^{4} – player scored 4 goals

=== Clean sheets ===
Rank	Player	Club	Clean sheets
1	(Luxembourg) Anthony Moris	Union SG	20
2	(Belgium) Colin Coosemans	Anderlecht	17
3	(Belgium) Davy Roef	Gent	11
3	(Belgium) Tobe Leysen	OH Leuven	11
5	(Belgium) Matthieu Epolo	Standard Liege	10
5	(Belgium) Simon Mignolet	Club Brugge	10
5	(Belgium) Ortwin De Wolf	Mechelen	10
8	(Belgium) Senne Lammens	Antwerp	9
9	(Belgium) Hendrik van Crombrugge	Genk	8
9	(Netherlands) Michael Verrips	Dender EH	8

=== Discipline ===
==== Player ====
- Most yellow cards: 12
  - (Belgium) Birger Verstraete (OH Leuven)
- Most red cards: 2
  - 6 players

==== Club ====
- Most yellow cards: 96
  - Westerlo
- Fewest yellow cards: 54
  - Genk
- Most red cards: 7
  - Beerschot
  - OH Leuven
- Fewest red cards: 2
  - 3 clubs

== Awards ==
Award	Winner	Club
Player of the Season	(Switzerland) Ardon Jashari	Club Brugge
Talent of the Season	(Switzerland) Ardon Jashari	Club Brugge
Goal of the Season	(Greece) Konstantinos Karetsas	Genk
Coach of the Season	(Belgium) Sébastien Pocognoli	Union Saint-Gilloise

Team of the Season
Goalkeeper	(Belgium) Colin Coosemans (Anderlecht)			
Defenders	(Morocco) Zakaria El Ouahdi (Genk)	(Belgium) Brandon Mechele (Club Brugge)	(Argentina) Kevin Mac Allister (Union Saint-Gilloise)	(Belgium) Maxim De Cuyper (Club Brugge)
Midfielders	(Belgium) Noah Sadiki (Union Saint-Gilloise)	(Switzerland) Ardon Jashari (Club Brugge)	(Belgium) Hans Vanaken (Club Brugge)	
Forwards	(Greece) Christos Tzolis (Club Brugge)	(Belgium) Tjaronn Chery (Royal Antwerp)	(Nigeria) Tolu Arokodare (Genk)	

== Attendances ==
The clubs are listed by average home league attendance.

No.	Club	Average attendance	Change	Highest
1	Club Brugge	22,496	3,7%	25,900
2	RSC Anderlecht	17,977	3,8%	21,900
3	KRC Genk	17,829	-3,0%	23,187
4	Standard de Liège	14,859	-8,8%	23,675
5	KAA Gent	13,779	-5,4%	17,674
6	Royal Antwerp FC	13,196	0,4%	16,144
7	KV Mechelen	12,213	-1,3%	16,248
8	Sporting de Charleroi	7,600	2,4%	11,793
9	RUSG	7,433	12,9%	8,610
10	Oud-Heverlee Leuven	6,938	9,9%	9,930
11	KV Kortrijk	6,844	2,6%	8,901
12	STVV	5,723	-0,2%	10,073
13	Beerschot	5,707	17,2%	11,256
14	KVC Westerlo	5,630	2,7%	8,035
15	Cercle Brugge	5,584	-5,9%	10,606
16	FCV Dender	3,373	173,0%	6,429

== See also ==
- 2024–25 Challenger Pro League
- 2024–25 Belgian Division 1
- 2024–25 Belgian Division 2
- 2024–25 Belgian Division 3
- 2024–25 Belgian Cup
