= 2023–24 Belgian Pro League =

121st season of top-tier football in Belgium

Belgian Pro League
- Season: 2023–24
- Dates: 28 July 2023 – 2 June 2024
- Champions: Club Brugge; 19th title
- Relegated: RWD Molenbeek; Eupen
- Champions League: Club Brugge; Union SG
- Europa League: Anderlecht; Cercle Brugge
- Conference League: Gent
- Matches: 312
- Goals: 886 (2.84 per match)
- Top goalscorer: Kévin Denkey (27 goals)
- Biggest home win: Antwerp 6–0 Kortrijk (11 August 2023); Club Brugge 7–1 RWDM (20 August 2023); Antwerp 6–0 Standard Liège (11 November 2023)
- Biggest away win: Eupen 0–5 Club Brugge (13 August 2023); RWD Molenbeek 1–6 Club Brugge (22 December 2023) Standard Liège 0–5 KVC Westerlo (10 May 2024)
- Highest scoring: Club Brugge 7–1 RWD Molenbeek (20 August 2023)
- Longest winning run: 8 matches Union SG
- Longest unbeaten run: 24 matches Union SG
- Longest winless run: 13 matches RWDM
- Longest losing run: 6 matches Westerlo; Eupen
- Highest attendance: 27,645; Club Brugge 0–0 Cercle Brugge (26 May 2024)
- Lowest attendance: 0 (behind closed doors); Sporting Charleroi 1–1 OH Leuven (29 July 2023); Standard Liège 0–0 OH Leuven (6 April 2024)
- Total attendance: 3,261,502 (312 matches)
- Average attendance: 10,454

The 2023–24 Belgian Pro League (officially known as the Jupiler Pro League due to sponsorship reasons) was the 121st season of top-tier football in Belgium. Club Brugge were crowned champions for the 19th time in their history having come back from fourth at the start of the title play-offs. For the second time in three seasons, Union Saint-Gilloise finished top at the end of the regular season, but did not win the league.

== Format change ==
After 3 seasons, the Belgian Pro League returned to the "old" format, featuring the number of teams reduced from 18 to 16, and with similar play-offs as it was pre-COVID-19. After the regular season, the top six teams qualified for the champions' play-offs (commonly called "Play-offs I"), teams from 7th to 12th place qualified for the Europe play-offs (commonly called "Play-offs II"), but most importantly the number of teams relegating increased from one to either two or three, as the bottom four teams (13th through 16th) played relegation play-offs after completion, of which the bottom two teams were relegated directly, with the team finishing 14th overall playing the 3rd-place finisher of the 2023–24 Challenger Pro League for the final spot in the 2024–25 Belgian Pro League.

== Teams ==
Due to the league format change which reduced the number of teams back from 18 to 16, the bottom three teams had been relegated to the Challenger Pro League: Oostende (after ten seasons), Seraing (after two seasons) and Zulte Waregem (after 18 seasons). They were replaced by RWD Molenbeek, the winner of the 2022–23 Challenger Pro League. Officially, this RWD Molenbeek played their first-ever season in the top flight, however the club saw itself as the successor of the former RWD Molenbeek, one-time Belgian champion, which last played at the highest level in 2002. Another distinct successor team with similar name RWDM Brussels also played four seasons at the highest level from 2004 to 2008.

=== Stadiums and locations ===
Locations of the 2023–24 Belgian Pro League teams

Matricule	Club	Location	Venue	Capacity
35	Anderlecht	Anderlecht, Brussels	Constant Vanden Stock Stadium	21,500
1	Antwerp	Antwerp	Bosuilstadion	16,144
12	Cercle Brugge	Bruges	Jan Breydel Stadium	29,042
22	Charleroi	Charleroi	Stade du Pays de Charleroi	14,000
3	Club Brugge	Bruges	Jan Breydel Stadium	29,042
4276	Eupen	Eupen	Kehrwegstadion	8,363
322	Genk	Genk	Cegeka Arena	24,956
7	Gent	Ghent	Ghelamco Arena	20,000
19	Kortrijk	Kortrijk	Guldensporen Stadion	9,399
25	Mechelen	Mechelen	AFAS-stadion Achter de Kazerne	16,700
18	OH Leuven	Leuven	Den Dreef	10,000
5479	RWD Molenbeek	Molenbeek, Brussels	Edmond Machtens Stadium	12,266
373	Sint-Truiden	Sint-Truiden	Stayen	14,600
16	Standard Liège	Liège	Stade Maurice Dufrasne	30,023
10	Union SG	Forest, Brussels	Stade Joseph Marien	9,400
2024	Westerlo	Westerlo	Het Kuipje	8,035

=== Number of teams by provinces ===
Number of teams	Province or region	Team(s)
3	Antwerp	Antwerp, Mechelen and Westerlo
3	Brussels	Anderlecht, RWD Molenbeek and Union SG
3	West Flanders	Cercle Brugge, Club Brugge and Kortrijk
2	Limburg	Genk and Sint-Truiden
2	Liège	Eupen and Standard Liège
1	East Flanders	Gent
1	Flemish Brabant	Oud-Heverlee Leuven
1	Hainaut	Charleroi

=== Personnel and kits ===
Club	Manager	Kit Manufacturer	Shirt sponsors (front)	Shirt sponsors (back)	Shirt sponsors (sleeve)	Shorts sponsor
Anderlecht	(Denmark) Brian Riemer	Joma	DVV Insurance (H)/Candriam (A)	None	Napoleon Games	None
Antwerp	(Netherlands) Mark van Bommel	Jako	betFIRST	Heylen Vastgoed, Ghelamco	None	None
Cercle Brugge	(Austria) Miron Muslic	Kappa	Golden Palace Casino Sports	Liantis, Callant Insurance	Volvo Automobilia, Brugge	Autoverhuur Meerschaert, Callant Insurance
Charleroi	(Belgium) Rik De Mil (Note: Felice Mazzù managed the team during the regular season but was sacked before the start of the play-offs.)	Kipsta	Unibet, R-Aqua, Cairox	QNT Sport	None	UMons
Club Brugge	(Belgium) Nicky Hayen (Note: Ronny Deila managed the team during the regular season but was sacked before the start of the play-offs.)	Macron	Unibet	Allianz	BWT	None
Eupen	(Belgium) Kristoffer Andersen & (France) Raphaël Fèvre (Note: Florian Kohfeldt managed the team during the regular season but left before the start of the play-offs.)	Adidas	Aspire Academy, Ostbelgien	None	Johnen Automobile	None
Genk	(Belgium) Domenico Olivieri, (Belgium) Michel Ribeiro & (Belgium) Eddy Vanhemel (caretakers) (Note: Wouter Vrancken managed the team during the regular season and the first 7 matchdays of the champions' play-offs.)	Nike	Beobank, EAZER	CEO's 4 Climate, Carglass	Aqua-Step HDM	Cegeka, Carglass
Gent	(Belgium) Hein Vanhaezebrouck	Craft	Bâloise	Circus Belgium, Vdk bank	Hyundai	APF Autoparts, Vdk bank
Kortrijk	(Iceland) Freyr Alexandersson (Note: Edward Still was the manager for matchdays 1 through 8, Joseph Akpala was caretaker manager on matchday 9 and again from matchday 17 to 20, and Glen De Boeck managed the team from matchday 10 to 16.)	Erreà	AGO Jobs & HR, Unibet	Brustor, Earth Belgium, Caps Fuel Card	NOVA	Unibet, Caps Fuel Card
Mechelen	(Kosovo) Besnik Hasi (Note: Steven Defour was the manager for matchdays 1 through 12, Frederik Vanderbiest acted as caretaker manager for matchdays 12 through 14)	Erreà	Telenet, Groep Verelst, Play Sports, AFAS Software	AFAS Software	None	Arco Information, Golden Palace Casino Sports
OH Leuven	(Spain) Óscar García (Note: Marc Brys was the manager for matchdays 1 through 10, Eddy Vanhemel acted as caretaker manager on matchdays 11 through 13.)	Stanno	Star Casino	Tegel Concept	Banqup	None
RWD Molenbeek	(Belgium) Yannick Ferrera (Note: Caçapa was the manager for matchdays 1 through 25, Bruno Irles managed the team for matchdays 26 through 30 but was replaced before the start of the play-offs.)	Kipsta	Golden Palace Casino Sports	M&G Cleaning	None	Liften De Weghe, Tadal
Sint-Truiden	(Germany) Thorsten Fink	Macron	Nishitan Clinic, DMM.com, City Creation, Maruhan	Sint Truiden	Asahi Kasei, Maruhan	Pauli Beton, Star Casino
Standard Liège	(Croatia) Ivan Leko (Note: Carl Hoefkens was the manager for matchdays 1 through 20.)	Adidas	VOO	Circus Belgium	Cainiao	None
Union SG	(Germany) Alexander Blessin	Nike	Loterie Nationale/Hey! Telecom (in UEFA matches)	Hey! Telecom	None	None
Westerlo	(Belgium) Bart Goor (Note: Jonas De Roeck was the manager for matchdays 1 through 16, Bart Goor took up the caretaker position of matchday 17, and Rik De Mil managed the team for matchdays 18 through 30.)	Nike	Soudal	Casino777, Arma Global	Keukens Vanlommel, Voetbalshop.be	None

=== Managerial changes ===
Team	Outgoing manager	Manner of departure	Date of vacancy	Position	Replaced by	Date of appointment
Club Brugge	(Belgium) Rik De Mil	Caretaker replaced	End of 2022–23 season	Pre-season	(Norway) Ronny Deila	5 June 2023 (Note: While the announcement of Ronny Deila's signature at Club Brugge was already made on 25 May 2023, Rik De Mil remained in charge for the last few matches of the season and Deila thus only officially took up the position as soon as the 2022–23 season ended.)
Eupen	(Belgium) Edward Still	Mutual consent	End of 2022–23 season	Pre-season	(Germany) Florian Kohfeldt	8 June 2023
Kortrijk	(Germany) Bernd Storck	Mutual consent	End of 2022–23 season	Pre-season	(Belgium) Edward Still	2 July 2023
Sint-Truiden	(Germany) Bernd Hollerbach	Mutual consent	End of 2022–23 season	Pre-season	(Germany) Thorsten Fink	16 May 2023
Standard Liège	(Belgium) Geoffrey Valenne	Caretaker replaced	End of 2022–23 season	Pre-season	(Belgium) Carl Hoefkens	16 June 2023
Union SG	(Belgium) Karel Geraerts	No extension agreement found	21 June 2023	Pre-season	(Germany) Alexander Blessin	3 July 2023
RWD Molenbeek	(Belgium) Vincent Euvrard	Sacked	24 July 2023	Pre-season	(Brazil) Caçapa	25 July 2023
Kortrijk	(Belgium) Edward Still	Sacked	25 September 2023	16th	(Nigeria) Joseph Akpala (caretaker)	25 September 2023
Kortrijk	(Nigeria) Joseph Akpala (caretaker)	Caretaker replaced	2 October 2023 (Note: While the announcement of Glen De Boeck's signature at Kortrijk was already made on 28 September 2023, it was added that he would only take over on 2 October 2023, meaning caretaker Joseph Akpala remained in charge for the match of 29 September 2023.)	16th (Note: At the time of the announcement of Glen De Boeck's signature at Kortrijk the team was in last place. When he actually took over a few days later the team had moved into 15th.)	(Belgium) Glen De Boeck	2 October 2023
OH Leuven	(Belgium) Marc Brys	Sacked	13 October 2023	14th	(Belgium) Eddy Vanhemel (caretaker)	13 October 2023
Mechelen	(Belgium) Steven Defour	Sacked	2 November 2023	13th	(Belgium) Frederik Vanderbiest (caretaker)	2 November 2023
OH Leuven	(Belgium) Eddy Vanhemel	Caretaker replaced	5 November 2023 (Note: While the announcement of Óscar García's signature at OH Leuven was already made on 3 November 2023, caretaker Vanhemel remained in charge for the match of 4 November and García took over only after that match.)	13th	(Spain) Óscar García	5 November 2023
Mechelen	(Belgium) Frederik Vanderbiest	Caretaker replaced	8 November 2023 (Note: While the announcement of Besnik Hasi's signature at KV Mechelen was already made on 8 November 2023, caretaker Vanderbiest remained in charge for the match of 11 November and Hasi took over only after that match.)	14th (Note: At the time of the announcement of Besnik Hasi's signature at Mechelen the team was in 14th place. When he actually took over a few days later the team had moved into 11th.)	(Kosovo) Besnik Hasi	8 November 2023
Westerlo	(Belgium) Jonas De Roeck	Sacked	2 December 2023	15th	(Belgium) Bart Goor (caretaker)	2 December 2023
Kortrijk	(Belgium) Glen De Boeck	Sacked	6 December 2023	16th	(Nigeria) Joseph Akpala (caretaker)	6 December 2023
Westerlo	(Belgium) Bart Goor (caretaker)	Caretaker replaced	12 December 2023	14th	(Belgium) Rik De Mil	12 December 2023
Standard Liège	(Belgium) Carl Hoefkens	Sacked	31 December 2023	9th	(Croatia) Ivan Leko	4 January 2024
Kortrijk	(Nigeria) Joseph Akpala (caretaker)	Caretaker replaced	5 January 2024	16th	(Iceland) Freyr Alexandersson	5 January 2024
RWD Molenbeek	(Brazil) Caçapa	Sacked	11 February 2024	14th	(France) Bruno Irles	14 February 2024
Eupen	(Germany) Florian Kohfeldt	Resigned	16 March 2024	14th	(Belgium) Kristoffer Andersen & (France) Raphaël Fèvre	25 March 2024
Club Brugge	(Norway) Ronny Deila	Sacked	18 March 2024	4th	(Belgium) Nicky Hayen (caretaker)	18 March 2024
Westerlo	(Belgium) Rik De Mil	Sacked	19 March 2024	11th	(Belgium) Bart Goor (caretaker)	19 March 2024
Charleroi	(Belgium) Felice Mazzù	Sacked	20 March 2024	13th	(Belgium) Rik De Mil	22 March 2024
RWD Molenbeek	(France) Bruno Irles	Sacked	23 March 2024	16th	(Belgium) Yannick Ferrera	23 March 2024
Genk	(Belgium) Wouter Vrancken	Mutual consent	9 May 2024	4th (Champions' play-offs)	(Belgium) Domenico Olivieri, (Belgium) Michel Ribeiro & (Belgium) Eddy Vanhemel (caretakers)	9 May 2024

== Regular season ==
=== League table ===
Pos	Team	Pld	W	D	L	GF	GA	GD	Pts	Qualification or relegation
1	Union SG	30	21	7	2	63	31	+32	70	Qualification for the Europa League and champions' play-offs (Note: The regular season winner qualified for the 2024–25 UEFA Europa League if not earning 2024–25 UEFA Champions League in the play-off.)
2	Anderlecht	30	18	9	3	58	30	+28	63	Qualification for the champions' play-offs
3	Antwerp	30	14	10	6	55	27	+28	52	Qualification for the champions' play-offs
4	Club Brugge	30	14	9	7	62	29	+33	51	Qualification for the champions' play-offs
5	Cercle Brugge	30	14	5	11	44	34	+10	47	Qualification for the champions' play-offs
6	Genk	30	12	11	7	51	31	+20	47	Qualification for the champions' play-offs
7	Gent	30	12	11	7	53	38	+15	47	Qualification for the Europe play-offs
8	Mechelen	30	13	6	11	39	34	+5	45	Qualification for the Europe play-offs
9	Sint-Truiden	30	10	10	10	35	46	−11	40	Qualification for the Europe play-offs
10	Standard Liège	30	8	10	12	33	41	−8	34	Qualification for the Europe play-offs
11	Westerlo	30	7	9	14	42	54	−12	30	Qualification for the Europe play-offs
12	OH Leuven	30	7	8	15	34	47	−13	29	Qualification for the Europe play-offs
13	Charleroi	30	7	8	15	26	48	−22	29	Qualification for the relegation play-offs
14	Eupen	30	7	3	20	24	58	−34	24	Qualification for the relegation play-offs
15	Kortrijk	30	6	6	18	22	57	−35	24	Qualification for the relegation play-offs
16	RWD Molenbeek	30	5	8	17	31	67	−36	23	Qualification for the relegation play-offs

Source: Jupiler Pro League (in Dutch), Soccerway
Rules for classification: 1) Points; 2) Matches won; 3) Goal difference; 4) Goals scored; 5) Away matches won; 6) Away goal difference; 7) Away goals scored; 8) Play-off.

=== Results ===
Home \ Away	USG	AND	ANT	CLU	CER	GNK	GNT	MEC	STR	STA	WES	OHL	CHA	EUP	KVK	RWD
Union SG		2–0	2–2	2–1	2–1	0–2	1–1	1–0	2–1	2–1	2–2	5–1	3–1	4–1	3–0	3–2
Anderlecht	2–2		1–0	1–1	2–0	2–1	1–0	3–1	4–1	2–2	2–1	5–1	2–1	1–0	0–1	2–1
Antwerp	1–1	1–1		2–1	1–0	3–2	0–0	0–1	3–0	6–0	2–2	1–0	4–1	4–1	6–0	0–0
Club Brugge	1–1	1–2	2–1		0–0	1–1	2–0	1–1	1–1	2–0	3–0	3–1	4–2	4–0	3–3	7–1
Cercle Brugge	0–2	0–3	1–3	1–1		0–1	2–0	2–3	4–1	1–1	2–1	3–2	2–0	2–0	3–0	4–0
Genk	0–1	1–1	3–0	0–3	1–1		2–2	4–0	3–3	1–0	3–3	3–1	0–0	0–1	4–0	3–1
Gent	1–1	1–1	2–2	2–1	1–2	1–1		1–2	2–2	3–1	2–2	4–0	5–0	2–1	3–2	4–0
Mechelen	4–0	2–2	0–0	0–0	0–2	1–1	0–1		0–2	3–0	3–1	1–2	1–0	1–0	3–0	3–1
Sint-Truiden	0–4	0–1	1–1	2–1	0–2	1–1	4–1	2–0		1–0	1–0	1–1	1–0	1–1	1–0	2–1
Standard Liège	0–1	3–2	0–1	2–1	0–1	1–0	4–2	1–1	1–1		0–0	1–0	0–0	4–0	0–1	1–1
Westerlo	1–3	1–3	0–3	0–1	4–2	1–1	1–3	2–3	3–3	2–1		0–3	0–1	2–0	1–0	3–0
OH Leuven	0–2	1–1	1–1	0–1	1–2	2–1	1–1	1–0	4–0	1–2	0–2		0–0	3–0	3–0	1–2
Charleroi	1–3	1–3	3–2	1–4	0–0	0–1	1–3	3–1	1–1	1–1	3–2	1–1		1–0	1–0	2–1
Eupen	1–2	1–3	1–0	0–5	0–2	1–3	0–2	0–1	1–0	1–3	2–2	3–1	2–0		1–1	1–3
Kortrijk	1–3	2–2	0–1	1–0	2–1	0–3	0–2	0–3	0–1	1–1	1–2	0–0	1–0	1–3		3–2
RWD Molenbeek	2–3	0–3	0–4	1–6	2–1	0–4	1–1	1–0	3–0	2–2	1–1	1–1	0–0	0–1	1–1	

Source: Kalender eerste klasse A 2023-24
Legend: Blue = home team win; Yellow = draw; Red = away team win.

== Play-offs ==
=== Champions' play-offs ===
The champions' play-offs decided the overall league champion. The top six teams of the Regular season qualified and played a round-robin tournament, with each team starting with half the points obtained during the regular season. The starting points were rounded up, in case of ties in standings at the end of the champions' play-offs, any half points gained were deducted first.

The points of Anderlecht, Club Brugge, Cercle Brugge and Genk were rounded up, and thus in the event of a tie on points, Union SG and Antwerp would always be ranked ahead of those four teams.

The teams finishing in the top four positions after conclusion of the champions' play-offs qualified for European football, with the team in position five facing the winner of the Europe play-offs for the final ticket.

Pos	Team	Pld	W	D	L	GF	GA	GD	Pts	Qualification or relegation	CLU	USG	AND	CER	GNK	ANT
1	Club Brugge (C)	10	7	3	0	21	6	+15	50	Qualification for the Champions League league stage	—	2–2	3–1	0–0	4–0	3–0
2	Union SG	10	4	2	4	17	12	+5	49	Qualification for the Champions League third qualifying round	1–2	—	0–0	2–3	2–0	4–1
3	Anderlecht	10	4	2	4	12	12	0	46	Qualification for the Europa League play-off round	0–1	2–1	—	3–0	2–1	1–0
4	Cercle Brugge	10	3	4	3	13	13	0	37	Qualification for the Europa League second qualifying round (Note: Union SG qualified for the Europa League play-off round by winning the 2023–24 Belgian Cup. The Europa League second qualifying spot and the European competition play-off spot were thus passed to the next two highest-placed teams that did not qualify for European competitions.)	1–1	1–2	1–1	—	4–1	0–1
5	Genk	10	4	1	5	8	17	−9	37	Qualification for the European competition play-off	0–3	1–0	2–1	1–1	—	1–0
6	Antwerp	10	2	0	8	7	18	−11	32		1–2	0–3	3–1	1–2	0–1	—

Source: Jupiler Pro League (in Dutch), Soccerway
Legend: Blue = home team win; Yellow = draw; Red = away team win.
Rules for classification: 1) Points; 2) Points without (possible) half points added due to rounding; 3) Regular season finishing position.
(C) Champions

=== Europe play-offs ===
The Europe play-offs were played by the teams in positions 7 through 12 at the conclusion of the Regular season. Teams played a round-robin tournament, with each team starting with half the points obtained during the regular season. The starting points were rounded up, in case of ties in standings at the end of the Europe play-offs, any half points gained were deducted first.

The points of Gent, Mechelen and OH Leuven were rounded up, and thus in the event of a tie on points, Sint-Truiden, Standard Liège and Westerlo would always be ranked ahead of those three teams.

The winner of the Europe play-offs faced the team finishing fifth in the champions' play-offs to decide which team qualified for European football.

Pos	Team	Pld	W	D	L	GF	GA	GD	Pts	Qualification or relegation	GNT	MEC	STR	OHL	WES	STA
1	Gent (O)	10	8	0	2	27	10	+17	48	Qualification for the European competition play-off	—	3–1	2–0	0–1	3–2	5–1
2	Mechelen	10	5	1	4	20	18	+2	39		2–4	—	2–3	3–0	3–2	3–2
3	Sint-Truiden	10	3	4	3	14	15	−1	33		0–2	2–1	—	1–1	2–0	3–3
4	OH Leuven	10	4	3	3	12	12	0	30		2–1	2–3	1–0	—	1–2	3–1
5	Westerlo	10	2	3	5	17	20	−3	24		0–3	0–2	2–2	1–1	—	3–3
6	Standard Liège	10	0	5	5	12	27	−15	22		1–4	0–0	1–1	0–0	0–5 (Note: Supporters of Standard Liège prevented the start of the game by blocking Standard's team bus's departure. On 28 May 2024, the Royal Belgian Football Association ruled that Standard had done too little to prevent this situation. As a result, the match was not replayed and Westerlo was awarded a 5–0 forfeit win.)	—

Source: Jupiler Pro League (in Dutch), Soccerway
Legend: Blue = home team win; Yellow = draw; Red = away team win.
Rules for classification: 1) Points; 2) Points without (possible) half points added due to rounding; 3) Regular season finishing position.
(O) Play-off winners

=== European competition play-off ===
A single match was played between the fifth place finisher of the champions' play-offs and Gent, the winner of the Europe play-offs, with home advantage to the team from the champions' play-offs. The winner qualified for European football.

Normally the fourth team of the champions' play-offs would be facing the winner of the Europe play-offs, but as Union SG won the 2023–24 Belgian Cup on 9 May 2024 and was already guaranteed of finishing in the top four, instead the fifth-placed team of the champions' play-offs, Genk, faced Gent.

2 June 2024
13:30 CEST

Genk	0–1	Gent
	Report	Hjulsager 60'

Cegeka Arena, Genk
Referee: Nicolas Laforge

=== Relegation play-offs ===
The bottom four teams after the regular season played the relegation play-offs, a round-robin tournament in which they started with the full points obtained during the regular season. The teams finishing in third and fourth at the conclusion of the relegation play-offs were relegated to the 2024–25 Challenger Pro League, and the team finishing in second place had to play the winner of the promotion play-offs, with the winner of that match playing in the 2024–25 Belgian Pro League.

Charleroi did not lose a single match during the play-offs and was already mathematically certain after four matchdays of not being relegated. Eupen was relegated after five matchdays, following a loss at Kortrijk. On the final matchday on 11 May 2024, to avoid direct relegation, RWD Molenbeek needed to win (at Eupen) and hope Kortrijk would not win (at Charleroi). Kortrijk did lose, but so did RWDM, sending Kortrijk to the promotion/relegation play-offs for an ultimate chance at avoiding relegation, while directly relegating RWD Molenbeek back to the Challenger Pro League.

Pos	Team	Pld	W	D	L	GF	GA	GD	Pts	Qualification or relegation	CHA	KVK	RWD	EUP
1	Charleroi	6	5	1	0	11	4	+7	45		—	3–1	0–0	1–0
2	Kortrijk (O)	6	2	1	3	7	10	−3	31	Qualification for the promotion/relegation play-offs	1–2	—	2–4	1–0
3	RWD Molenbeek (R)	6	2	1	3	8	9	−1	30	Relegation to Challenger Pro League	1–3	0–1	—	3–1
4	Eupen (R)	6	1	1	4	5	8	−3	28	Relegation to Challenger Pro League	1–2	1–1	2–0	—

Source: Jupiler Pro League (in Dutch), Soccerway
Legend: Blue = home team win; Yellow = draw; Red = away team win.
Rules for classification: 1) Points; 2) Regular season finishing position.
(O) Play-off winners; (R) Relegated

=== Promotion/relegation play-offs ===
The promotion/relegation play-offs were contested by the teams finishing in positions 3 to 6 in the 2023–24 Challenger Pro League, who met in a knockout tournament with both quarter-finals and semi-finals over two legs, and the highest season finisher always having home advantage in the return leg. The winner of the semi-finals played the 14th place finisher of the 2023–24 Belgian Pro League over two legs. The Belgian Pro League team had home advantage in the return leg; the winner of the final would play in the 2024–25 Belgian Pro League, with the loser playing in the 2024–25 Challenger Pro League.

==== Bracket ====
Quarter-finals
5	Zulte Waregem	1	0	1
4	Lommel	1	1	2
6	Patro Eisden Maasmechelen	0	1	1
3	Deinze	4	2	6

Semi-finals
4	Lommel	1	2	3
3	Deinze	1	1	2

Finals
14	Kortrijk (a.e.t.)	1	4	5
4	Lommel	0	2	2

==== Quarter-finals ====
27 April 2024
16:00 CEST

Patro Eisden Maasmechelen	0–4	Deinze
	Report	Almenara 42'; Kehrer 53', 78'; Mertens 63' (pen.)

Patrostadion, Maasmechelen
Referee: Wim Smet
1 May 2024
16:00 CEST

Deinze	2–1	Patro Eisden Maasmechelen
Schuermans 62'; Van Landschoot 71'	Report	Noubissi 18'

Dakota Arena, Deinze
Referee: Jan Boterberg

Deinze won 6–1 on aggregate.

27 April 2024
20:00 CEST

Zulte Waregem	1–1	Lommel
Vossen 66' (pen.)	Report	Dermane 89'

Elindus Arena, Waregem
Referee: Michiel Allaerts
1 May 2024
20:00 CEST

Lommel	1–0	Zulte Waregem
Schoofs 78'	Report

Soevereinstadion, Lommel
Referee: Wesli De Cremer

Lommel won 2–1 on aggregate.

==== Semi-finals ====
5 May 2024
16:00 CEST

Lommel	1–1	Deinze
Vancsa 55'	Report	Braken 76'

Soevereinstadion, Lommel
Referee: Lothar D'Hondt
12 May 2024
16:00 CEST

Deinze	1–2	Lommel
Mertens 66'	Report	Talvitie 41'; Rosa 80'

Dakota Arena, Deinze
Referee: Wesli De Cremer

Lommel won 3–2 on aggregate.

==== Finals ====
19 May 2024
19:15 CEST

Lommel	0–1	Kortrijk
	Report	Kadri 14' (pen.)

Soevereinstadion, Lommel
Referee: Lawrence Visser
26 May 2024
13:30 CEST

Kortrijk	4–2 (a.e.t.)	Lommel
Ambrose 96', 101', 117'; Silva 109'	Report	Rosa 3'; Schoofs 105' (pen.)

Guldensporen Stadion, Kortrijk
Referee: Bert Put

Kortrijk won 5–2 on aggregate.

== Season statistics ==
Despite teams not playing the same number of matches due to the play-offs, goals during the play-offs did count in determining the top scorer.

=== Top goalscorers ===
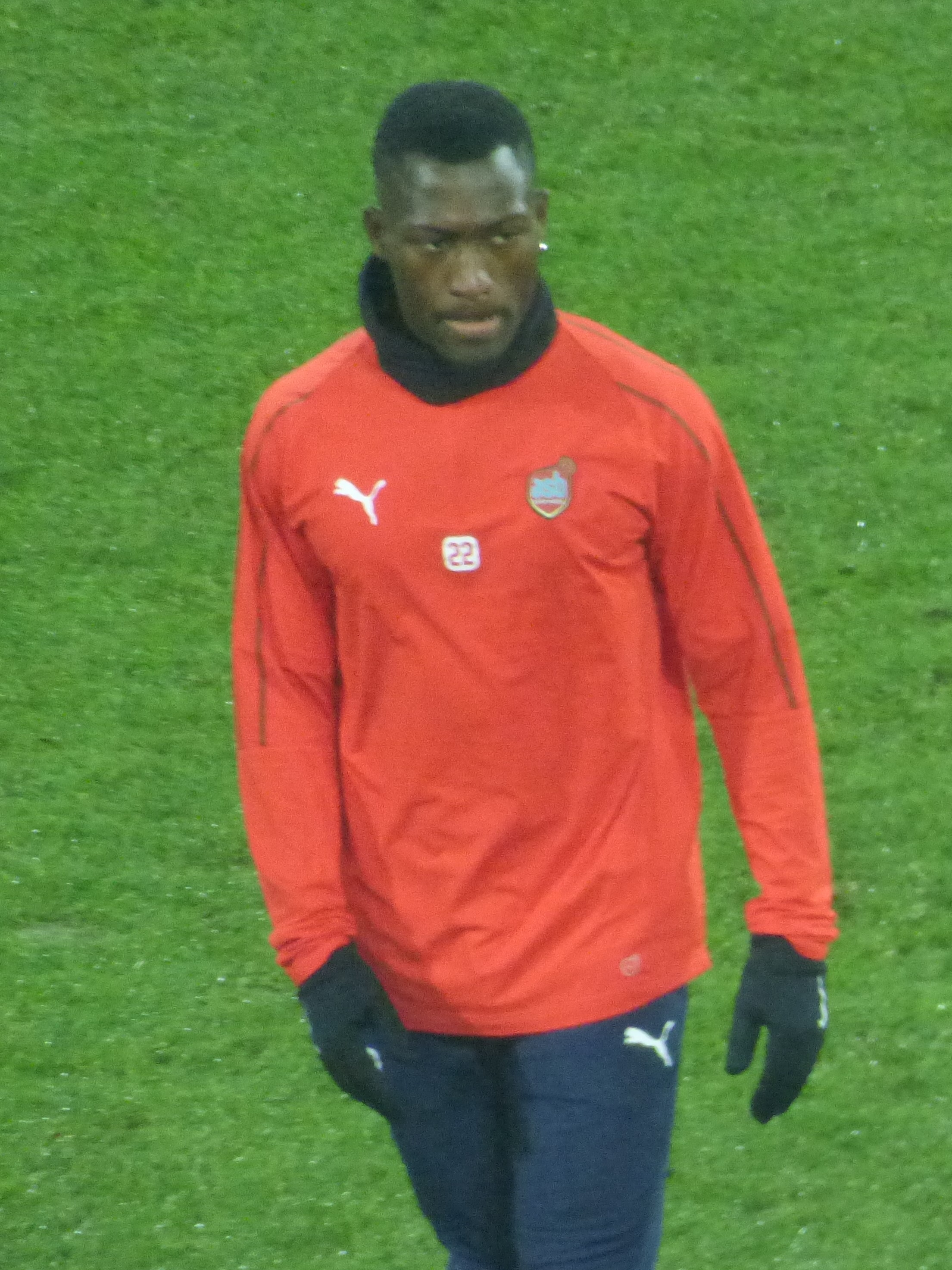
Cercle Brugge's Kévin Denkey finished as the season's top scorer with 27 goals.

Rank	Player	Club	Goals
1	(Togo) Kévin Denkey	Cercle Brugge	27
2	(Denmark) Anders Dreyer	Anderlecht	19
3	(Algeria) Mohamed Amoura	Union SG	18
3	(Brazil) Igor Thiago	Club Brugge	18
5	(Sweden) Gustaf Nilsson	Union SG	16
6	(Denmark) Kasper Dolberg	Anderlecht	15
6	(Mauritania) Aboubakary Koïta	Sint-Truiden	15
6	(Morocco) Tarik Tissoudali	Gent	15
9	(Denmark) Andreas Skov Olsen	Club Brugge	14
10	(Denmark) Nicolas Madsen	Westerlo	13

=== Clean sheets ===
Rank	Player	Club	Clean sheets
1	(Belgium) Maarten Vandevoordt	Genk	13
2	(France) Jean Butez	Antwerp	12
2	(Brazil) Warleson	Cercle Brugge	12
4	(Belgium) Gaëtan Coucke	Mechelen	11
4	(Belgium) Simon Mignolet	Club Brugge	11
4	(Luxembourg) Anthony Moris	Union SG	11
7	(Burkina Faso) Hervé Koffi	Charleroi	9
8	(Belgium) Arnaud Bodart	Standard Liège	7
8	(Belgium) Tobe Leysen	OH Leuven	7
8	(Belgium) Davy Roef	Gent	7
8	(Denmark) Kasper Schmeichel	Anderlecht	7

=== Discipline ===
==== Player ====
- Most yellow cards: 12
  - (Belgium) Hannes van der Bruggen (Cercle Brugge)
- Most red cards: 3
  - (Ghana) Christopher Bonsu Baah (Genk)

==== Club ====
- Most yellow cards: 93
  - Union SG
- Fewest yellow cards: 49
  - Gent
- Most red cards: 7
  - Genk
- Fewest red cards: 1
  - Mechelen
  - Sint-Truiden

== Awards ==
=== Annual awards ===
Annual awards
Award	Winner	Club
Jupiler Pro League Player of the Season	(Spain) Cameron Puertas	Union Saint-Gilloise
Nieuwsblad Talent of the Season	(Morocco) Bilal El Khannouss	Genk
Goal of the Season	(Spain) Ferran Jutglà	Club Brugge
Securex Coach of the Season	(Germany) Alexander Blessin	Union Saint-Gilloise
Referee of the Season	(Belgium) Jonathan Lardot	—

Team of the Season
Goalkeeper	(Brazil) Warleson (Cercle Brugge)			
Defence	(Belgium) Alessio Castro-Montes (Union Saint-Gilloise)	(Belgium) Brandon Mechele (Club Brugge)	(Belgium) Jan Vertonghen (Anderlecht)	(Japan) Koki Machida (Union Saint-Gilloise)
Midfield	(Belgium) Hans Vanaken (Club Brugge)	(Morocco) Bilal El Khannouss (Genk)	(Spain) Cameron Puertas (Union Saint-Gilloise)	(Belgium) Thorgan Hazard (Anderlecht)
Forwards	(Togo) Kévin Denkey (Cercle Brugge)		(Algeria) Mohamed Amoura (Union Saint-Gilloise)	

== Attendances ==
Club Brugge drew the highest average home attendance in the 2023-24 edition of the Belgian Pro League.

#	Football club	Home games	Average attendance	Average % filled
1	Club Brugge	15	20,876	71.88
2	Anderlecht	15	19,816	92.17
3	Standard Liège	15	19,574	65.2
4	Genk	15	17,738	71.08
5	Gent	15	15,216	76.08
6	Antwerp	15	14,261	88.34
7	Mechelen	15	13,156	78.78
8	Charleroi	15	8,827	63.05
9	Oud-Heverlee Leuven	15	7,645	76.45
10	Kortrijk	15	6,588	70.09
11	Union SG	15	6,394	68.02
12	Westerlo	15	6,387	79.49
13	Sint-Truiden	15	6,207	42.51
14	RWDM	15	5,828	47.51
15	Cercle Brugge	15	5,404	18.61
16	Eupen	15	3,074	36.76
