= Raymond Goethals Trophy =

Belgian football award

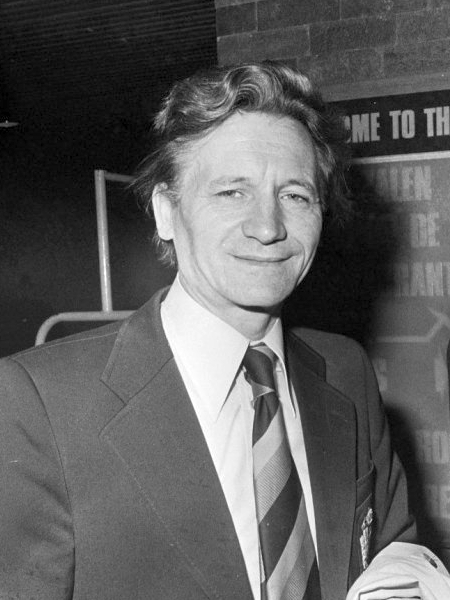
- Goethals in 1977
- Awarded for: Best Belgian football manager of the year
- Date: December
- Country: Belgium
- Presented by: Belgian football community
- First award: 2011
- Currently held by: (Belgium) Vincent Kompany

The Raymond Goethals Trophy is an annual football award presented to a Belgian manager, whose work, achievements, and managerial style best reflect the legacy of Raymond Goethals, one of Belgium's most successful and influential football coaches. The award has been presented since 2011.

== Background ==
The trophy is named after Raymond Goethals, a Belgian football manager known for his success with clubs such as Anderlecht, Standard Liège, and Olympique de Marseille, where he won the UEFA Champions League in 1993.

It is presented annually in December by a jury composed of former national team managers, previous winners of the trophy, referees, journalists, and members of the organizing committee. The ceremony often coincides with the anniversary of Goethals's death on December 6, 2004.

== Criteria ==
The award is granted to a Belgian manager or a manager with Belgian nationality working either in Belgium or abroad whose contributions to football in the preceding season are judged to be most in line with the tactical acumen, leadership, and influence exemplified by Raymond Goethals.

== Winners ==
The following managers have won the Raymond Goethals Trophy:

| Year | Manager | Club or Role |
|---|---|---|
| 2011 | Eric Gerets | Morocco national team |
| 2012 | Peter Maes | Lokeren |
| 2013 | Francky Dury | Zulte Waregem |
| 2014 | Marc Wilmots | Belgium national team |
| 2015 | Hein Vanhaezebrouck | Gent |
| 2016 | Michel Preud'homme | Club Brugge |
| 2017 | Felice Mazzù | Charleroi |
| 2018 | Philippe Clement | Genk |
| 2019 | Philippe Clement | Club Brugge |
| 2020 | Marc Brys | Oud-Heverlee Leuven |
| 2021 | Felice Mazzù | Union Saint-Gilloise |
| 2022 | Karel Geraerts | Union Saint-Gilloise |
| 2023 | Hein Vanhaezebrouck | Gent |
| 2024 | Nicky Hayen | Club Brugge |
| 2025 | Vincent Kompany | Bayern Munich |

== See also ==
- Raymond Goethals
- Belgian Golden Shoe – annual football award for players in Belgium
- Belgian Professional Manager of the Year
