= Computer Task Group =

American IT staffing company

Computer Task Group, Inc.
- Company type: Subsidiary
- Traded as: Nasdaq: CTG
- Industry: Computer software; IT consulting; IT staffing
- Founded: 1966; 60 years ago
- Headquarters: Buffalo, New York, United States
- Key people: Filip Gydé (Retired)(CEO); John Laubacker (Retired) (CFO)
- Revenue: ▲US$ 394.2 million (2019)
- Operating income: ▲US$ 6.9 million (2019)
- Net income: ▲US$ 4.1 million (2019)
- Total assets: ▲US$ 158.7 million (2019)
- Total equity: ▲US$ 66.2 million (2019)
- Number of employees: 3,950 (2019)
- Parent: Cegeka (2023–present)
- Website: www.ctg.com

Computer Task Group, Inc. (commonly referred to as CTG) is an American multinational company headquartered in Buffalo, New York, that provides information technology staffing. December 2023, it was announced that Cegeka concluded the purchase of the majority stake (74%) in CTG.

== History ==
Initially known as Marks-Baer Inc. (MBTI), the company was founded in 1966 by Randolph A. Marks and G. David Baer, two former employees of IBM, in Buffalo, New York. MBI's initial market was the medical industry, since both founders had experience in that area.

A year after its staff grew to 20 employees and its name was changed to Computer Task Group Inc. (CTG), the firm went public in 1969. Six years later, it decided to become a national company. CTG accelerated growth through acquisitions beginning in 1980 and within 5 years, acquired 15 companies.

In 1986, it made its first international acquisition, Shubrook International, Ltd., a software consulting firm based in Chertsey, England. In 2018, five years after purchasing etrinity N.V., a healthcare IT company in Belgium, CTG acquired Soft Company, a consulting and digital services company headquartered in Paris, France.

In August 2023, it was announced CTG had been acquired by the Hasselt-headquartered IT services and consultancy company, Cegeka for $107 million. In December, it was announced that the acquisition had been completed.

=== Acquisitions ===
- Diversified Systems Inc. (1983)
- Automated Business Systems, Inc. (1983)
- Berger, Vernay & Co. (1985)
- Delta Force Inc. (1985)
- Documentation Resources, Inc. (1986)
- Shubrooks International, Ltd. (1986)
- Applied Management Systems, Inc. (1988)
- Connolly Data Systems Inc. (1990)
- Telecommunications Management Consultants (1990)
- Rendeck International N.V. (1990)
- Elumen Solutions Inc. (1999)
- etrinity N.V. (2013)
- Soft Company (2018)
- Tech-IT (2019)

=== Divestitures ===
- Profimatics Inc. (1994)

== Services ==
CTG develops IT for companies in several industries including healthcare and technology services, and provides managed services IT staffing for technology companies and large corporations. The company concentrates on the financial services, telecommunications, government, industry, life sciences, and healthcare sectors. The scope of offered services includes development and integration, application management, information security, system and process assessment, and IT consulting.

CTG Belgium created a software testing methodology called FASTBoX (Framework for Automated Software Testing Based On eXperience).

=== Operations ===
CTG operates in North America (US and Canada), Western Europe (Belgium, Luxembourg, United Kingdom and France), and India. It counts about 451 clients; its largest clients are IBM and SDI International. As of December 2019, the company employs approximately 3,950 people worldwide, with 2,650 in the United States and Canada and 1,300 in Europe.

In 2018, the company operated 9 subsidiaries:

- Computer Task Group of Canada, Inc.
- Computer Task Group Belgium N.V.
- CTG ITS S.A.
- Computer Task Group IT Solutions, S.A.
- Computer Task Group Luxembourg PSF
- Computer Task Group (U.K.) Ltd.
- CTG Health Solutions N.V.
- Soft Company SAS (“Soft Company”)
- Computer Task Information Technology Services Private Limited
