= Brian Riemer =

Danish football manager (born 1978)

Personal information
- Date of birth: 22 September 1978 (age 48)
- Place of birth: Albertslund, Denmark

Team information
- Current team: Denmark (manager)

Senior career*
Years	Team	Apps	(Gls)
	Albertslund IF	20	(0)

Managerial career
- 2008: Hvidovre (caretaker)
- 2022–2024: Anderlecht
- 2024–: Denmark
- * Club domestic league appearances and goals

Brian Riemer (born 22 September 1978) is a Danish professional football manager who is the head coach of the Denmark national team.

After beginning in youth football in Denmark, Riemer joined FC Copenhagen, where he progressed from academy coaching to the first-team staff and won the 2012–13 Danish Superliga. He later served as assistant to Thomas Frank at Brentford, helping the club win promotion to the Premier League in 2021.

Appointed head coach of Anderlecht in 2022, he took the Belgian club to the quarter-finals of the UEFA Europa Conference League in his first season and a third-place league finish in 2023–24 before being dismissed early in the following campaign. In October 2024, he was appointed Denmark manager, leading the side to the quarter-finals of the UEFA Nations League before failing to qualify for the 2026 FIFA World Cup.

== Early life ==
Riemer was born on 22 September 1978 and grew up in Albertslund. He played his entire senior career with Albertslund IF, making 20 first-team appearances and helping the club win promotion to the Denmark Series in 1997, before moving into youth coaching there. He had originally intended to study medicine and did not initially plan on becoming a professional football coach.

== Coaching career ==
=== Early years and Copenhagen ===
Riemer began coaching in youth football with Albertslund IF before joining Hvidovre IF, where he worked in the youth set-up alongside Thomas Frank. During his time at Hvidovre, he also held a part-time role with Norwich City in England, undertaking scouting and coaching work with both the first team and the youth department. He later served as assistant coach to Hvidovre's first team and briefly took caretaker charge for two 1st Division matches in 2008 before joining FC Copenhagen the following year.

In July 2012, he was promoted by new manager Ariël Jacobs from the club's under-19 side to the first-team staff.

Copenhagen won the 2012–13 Danish Superliga title in Riemer's first season as assistant coach and qualified for the 2013–14 UEFA Champions League. The following campaign began poorly, however, and Jacobs was dismissed after five league matches without a win, with Ståle Solbakken returning to the club. Riemer remained on the first-team staff under Solbakken, but in 2015 returned, at his own request, to youth coaching with the club's under-19 side. He remained at Copenhagen until October 2018, when he left for England.

=== Brentford ===
On 26 October 2018, Riemer was appointed assistant head coach at Brentford, reuniting with Thomas Frank. He formed part of the coaching staff that led Brentford to promotion through the 2021 EFL Championship play-off final, taking the club into the top flight for the first time in 74 years. Brentford then finished 13th in their first Premier League season. In December 2022, Riemer left the club to take his first full senior managerial post.

== Managerial career ==
=== Anderlecht ===
Riemer was appointed head coach of Anderlecht in December 2022, replacing Felice Mazzù, with the club 12th in the Belgian Pro League. His first months in charge produced mixed results. Anderlecht reached the quarter-finals of the UEFA Europa Conference League, but domestic recovery proved limited and the club finished 11th, its lowest league placing since 1937.

Anderlecht nevertheless retained confidence in Riemer and extended his contract until 2026 in September 2023. After a summer rebuild that included the arrivals of Anders Dreyer, Kasper Dolberg, Thomas Delaney, Kasper Schmeichel and Thorgan Hazard, Anderlecht mounted a sustained title challenge in 2023–24. They remained in contention until the final day, when a 3–1 defeat away to Royal Antwerp left them third, three points behind champions Club Brugge.

The following season, however, brought renewed pressure. Although Anderlecht had qualified for the UEFA Europa League league phase, a run of weak results and unconvincing performances left Riemer under increasing scrutiny. He was dismissed on 19 September 2024, two days after a home defeat by Genk, with the club stating that the team's performances had been judged "insufficient".

=== Denmark ===
On 24 October 2024, Riemer was appointed manager of the Denmark national team on a contract running until the end of the 2026 FIFA World Cup.

Denmark finished second in their 2024–25 UEFA Nations League A group behind Spain, thereby qualifying for the competition's quarter-finals. Denmark then defeated Portugal 1–0 in Copenhagen in the first leg before losing 5–2 after extra time in Lisbon, and were eliminated 5–3 on aggregate. It was the first time Denmark had reached the knockout stage of the Nations League.

In October 2025, Riemer's contract was extended until the end of UEFA Euro 2028. During qualification for the 2026 FIFA World Cup, Denmark finished second in Group C behind Scotland. A goalless home draw with Belarus in November 2025, when Denmark could have taken a decisive step towards automatic qualification, was widely criticised in the Danish media and later cited as one of the key setbacks of the campaign. Denmark then advanced to the European play-offs, beating North Macedonia 4–0 in the Path D semi-final before losing the final to the Czech Republic on penalties after a 2–2 draw following extra time, thereby failing to qualify for the World Cup. In the aftermath of the defeat, Riemer came under increased pressure in Danish football coverage, though the Danish Football Association (DBU) publicly backed him to continue.

== Managerial statistics ==
As of match played 17 November 2026

Managerial record by team and tenure
Team	From	To	Record					
Team	From	To	G	W	D	L	Win %	Refs
Hvidovre IF (interim)	10 November 2008	31 December 2008	2	2	0	0	100.00	
Anderlecht	2 December 2022	19 September 2024	76	39	20	17	51.32	
Denmark (Note: Denmark was leading Ukraine 2–1 on 7 June 2026 before the match was abandoned in the 79th minute.)	24 October 2024	present	21	10	5	6	47.62	
Career total			99	51	25	23	51.52	
