= Rik De Mil =

Belgian football manager and former player

- De Mil with Gent in 2026

Personal information
- Date of birth: 15 September 1981 (age 45)
- Place of birth: Eeklo, Belgium
- Position: Goalkeeper

Team information
- Current team: Gent (manager)

Senior career*
Years	Team	Apps	(Gls)
- Oostkamp
- FC Veldegem

Managerial career
- 2012–2015: Oostkamp
- 2015–2018: Club Brugge (youth)
- 2018–2022: Club NXT
- 2022–2023: Club Brugge (assistant)
- 2023: Club Brugge (caretaker)
- 2023: Club Brugge (assistant)
- 2023–2024: Westerlo
- 2024–2025: Sporting Charleroi
- 2025–: KAA Gent
- * Club domestic league appearances and goals

Rik De Mil (born 15 September 1981) is a Belgian professional football manager and former player who is the manager of Belgian Pro League club KAA Gent. As a player, he was a goalkeeper.

== Coaching career ==
=== Club Brugge ===
In 2015, De Mil received an offer from Club Brugge to become a youth coach, following the departure of Sven Vermant. He coached Club NXT, the reserve team of Club Brugge, during the side's 2020–21 season in the Belgian First Division B. On 18 February 2021, he replaced Philippe Clement as head coach of Club Brugge in the Europa League round of 32 match against Dynamo Kyiv which ended in a 1–1 draw, during the COVID-19 pandemic. In June 2022, he was replaced as Club NXT coach by Nicky Hayen. Ahead of the 2022–23 season, Club Brugge announced that De Mil would be promoted to the first team, where he became assistant to Carl Hoefkens. After the latter's dismissal in December 2022, De Mil also served under Scott Parker. In March 2023, he obtained his UEFA Pro License trainer's diploma.

=== Westerlo ===
On 12 December 2023, De Mil signed a contract with Westerlo, where he succeeded Jonas De Roeck as head coach. He achieved better results, which saved the club from relegation, but was still dismissed on 19 March 2024, following the controversial 1–1 draw in the last match of the regular competition against Genk.

=== Charleroi ===
On 22 March 2024, Sporting Charleroi announced the signing of a 2-year contract with De Mil, replacing Felice Mazzu. De Mil helped Charleroi win all their games in the relegation play-off series to stay up.

=== Gent ===
On 10 December 2025, De Mil moved to KAA Gent on a contract until June 2028.

== Managerial statistics ==
As of match played 22 November 2026

Managerial record by team and tenure
Team	From	To	Record				
Team	From	To	G	W	D	L	Win %
Westerlo	12 December 2023	19 March 2024	13	4	4	5	30.77
Sporting Charleroi	22 March 2024	10 December 2025	69	29	16	24	42.03
Gent	10 December 2025	present	45	19	13	13	42.22
Total			127	52	33	42	40.94
