= Alexander Blessin =

German football manager

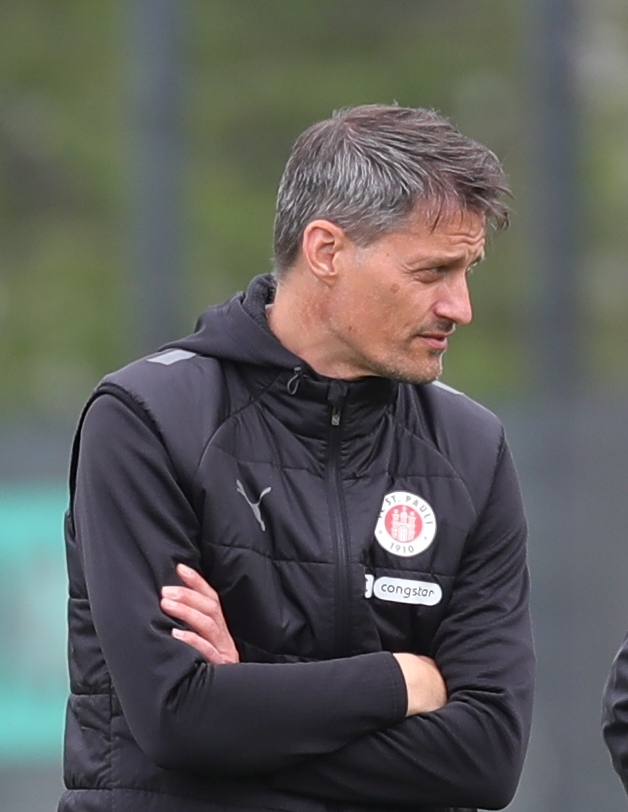
- Blessin in 2025 as manager of St. Pauli

Personal information
- Full name: Alexander Matthias Blessin
- Date of birth: 28 May 1973 (age 53)
- Place of birth: Stuttgart, West Germany
- Height: 1.89 m (6 ft 2 in)
- Position: Forward

Team information
- Current team: Borussia Mönchengladbach (head coach)

Senior career*
| Years | Team | Apps | (Gls) |
| –1995 | TSV Georgii Allianz Stuttgart | | |
| 1995–1996 | SV Bonlanden | | |
| 1996–1997 | TSF Ditzingen | 30 | (9) |
| 1997–1999 | VfB Stuttgart | 7 | (0) |
| 1999–2001 | Stuttgarter Kickers | 46 | (6) |
| 2001–2002 | Antalyaspor | 1 | (0) |
| 2002 | Wacker Burghausen | 10 | (1) |
| 2002–2003 | 1. FC Lokomotive Leipzig | 33 | (6) |
| 2003–2005 | SC Pfullendorf | 65 | (21) |
| 2005–2006 | 1899 Hoffenheim | 34 | (7) |
| 2006–2008 | Sportfreunde Siegen | 63 | (14) |
| 2008–2009 | Jahn Regensburg | 16 | (0) |
| 2009–2010 | SSV Reutlingen | 20 | (1) |
| 2010–2012 | SV Bonlanden | | |

Managerial career
- 2012–2018: RB Leipzig (U17)
- 2018–2020: RB Leipzig (U19)
- 2020–2022: KV Oostende
- 2022: Genoa
- 2023–2024: Union SG
- 2024–2026: St. Pauli
- 2026–: Borussia Mönchengladbach
- * Club domestic league appearances and goals

Alexander Blessin (born 28 May 1973) is a German professional football manager and former professional player, he is the currently head coach of Bundesliga club Borussia Mönchengladbach.

== Playing career ==
Blessin started his senior career with TSV Georgii Allianz Stuttgart. In 2001, he signed for Antalyaspor in the Turkish Süper Lig, where he made one league appearance. After that, he played for German clubs Wacker Burghausen, Lokomotive Leipzig, SC Pfullendorf, 1899 Hoffenheim, Sportfreunde Siegen, Jahn Regensburg, SSV Reutlingen, and SV Bonlanden before retiring in 2012.

== Coaching career ==
Following his retirement as an active player, Blessin joined RB Leipzig as a youth coach in 2012. He left Leipzig in 2020 to accept an offer as the new manager of KV Oostende in the Belgian First Division A.

He completed his first season with Oostende in fifth place, which led to him being linked to clubs such as Sheffield United and Celtic, as well as being named manager of the year in the Belgian top flight.

On 19 January 2022, he was hired by Serie A club Genoa as the club's new head coach under a two-and-a-half-year contract, after the Italian club paid a fixed fee to activate a buyout clause present in Blessin's contract with Oostende.

After failing to save Genoa from relegation, Blessin was confirmed in charge of the club for the 2022–23 Serie B season, with the goal to lead the Rossoblu promptly back to Serie A. On 6 December 2022, after a string of negative results, Blessin was dismissed from his role with immediate effect.

In July 2023, Blessin became head coach of Belgian side Union SG. He led the club to finish top of the 2023–24 regular season, eight points ahead of second-placed rival Anderlecht. On 9 May 2024, Union SG won the Belgian Cup final 1–0 against Royal Antwerp for the first time after 110 years.

In summer of 2024, he moved to St. Pauli. He was dismissed on 5 June 2026 after the club relegation back to 2. Bundesliga at the end of the 2025–26 season.

On 22 September 2026, he returned to the Bundesliga and was named head coach of Borussia Mönchengladbach.

== Managerial record ==
As of match played 21 November 2026

Managerial record by team and tenure
| Team | From | To | Record | | | | |
| Team | From | To | P | W | D | L | Win % |
|---|---|---|---|---|---|---|---|
| KV Oostende | 7 June 2020 | 19 January 2022 | 65 | 26 | 11 | 28 | 40.00 |
| Genoa | 19 January 2022 | 6 December 2022 | 33 | 11 | 12 | 10 | 33.33 |
| Union SG | 3 July 2023 | 27 June 2024 | 58 | 36 | 12 | 10 | 62.07 |
| St. Pauli | 1 July 2024 | 5 June 2026 | 74 | 16 | 18 | 40 | 21.62 |
| Borussia Mönchengladbach | 22 September 2026 | Present | 7 | 2 | 1 | 4 | 28.57 |
| Total | | | 237 | 91 | 54 | 92 | 38.40 |

== Honours ==
Union SG

- Belgian Cup: 2023–24

Individual

- Belgian professional Manager of the Year: 2020–21
- Pro League Awards Coach of the Season: 2023–24
