= Lennart Mertens =

Belgian footballer (born 1992)

Personal information
- Date of birth: 14 August 1992 (age 34)
- Place of birth: Zottegem, Belgium
- Height: 1.88 m (6 ft 2 in)
- Position: Forward

Team information
- Current team: Beveren
- Number: 92

Youth career
- 2001–2009: KFC Herzele
- 2001–2009: KSV Sottegem

Senior career*
Years	Team	Apps	(Gls)
2009–2012	KSV Sottegem	50	(11)
2012–2013	RC Bambrugge	18	(2)
2013–2016	SC Dikkelvenne	87	(57)
2016–2022	Deinze	148	(75)
2022	Club NXT	17	(5)
2023–2024	Deinze	47	(14)
2024–	Beveren	46	(32)
- * Club domestic league appearances and goals as of 19 April 2026

Lennart Mertens (born 14 August 1992) is a Belgian professional footballer who plays as a forward for Beveren in the Challenger Pro League.

== Career ==
In July 2016, Mertens joined Belgian First Amateur Division club Deinze on a free transfer. He made his competitive debut for the club on 27 August 2016, coming on as a 70th-minute substitute for Gert van Walle in a 3-1 Cup defeat to Lommel. After scoring 28 goals in 24 games during the 2019-20 season, Mertens signed a new three-year deal with the club.

On 27 November 2024, Mertens joined Beveren, after his club Deinze went bankrupt.

== Honors ==
Deinze

- Belgian First Amateur Division: 2019–20
