= Carglass =

Car glass repair brand

Carglass is a commercial brand for vehicle glass repair and replacement that belongs to the Belron group, a subsidiary of the Belgian D'Ieteren group.

The company was founded in Sweden in 1979 by the Belgian Leroi family, which already operated a wholesale business in automotive glass in Belgium. Carglass Nederland began operations in 1982 following the acquisition of wholesaler Mobielglas. Its first branch opened in Eindhoven, followed by a second location in Heerlen.

In 1987, Carglass became part of the South African Belron Group. The company’s major breakthrough came in 1989, marking the beginning of a period of rapid expansion in which the number of branches and employees, as well as turnover, increased dramatically.

By the end of the 1990s, the company had returned to Belgian ownership when automotive group D’Ieteren acquired a majority stake. The remaining shares were held by the Belgian investment group Cobepa.

In 2016, Carglass expanded its activities to include the repair of minor vehicle damage. However, in 2019 the company announced that it would discontinue this service due to disappointing repair volumes. At the time, the service was offered under the name Carmetics at 24 branches. Wherever possible, employees working in the repair division were reassigned to other positions within the company, although an undisclosed number of employees were ultimately dismissed.

In 2020, Belron acquired the automotive glass activities of car service chain A.T.U., Germany’s largest garage chain. Since then, Carglass has provided vehicle glass repairs and replacements at nearly 600 A.T.U. locations across Germany and Austria.

That same week, Belron also announced plans to scale back its activities in France. The company entered negotiations to sell Carglass Maison, its home repair service, to the German holding company Mutares and HomeServe France, part of the British publicly listed HomeServe Group.

== Locations ==
Carglass is present in most European countries and throughout the world.

=== France ===
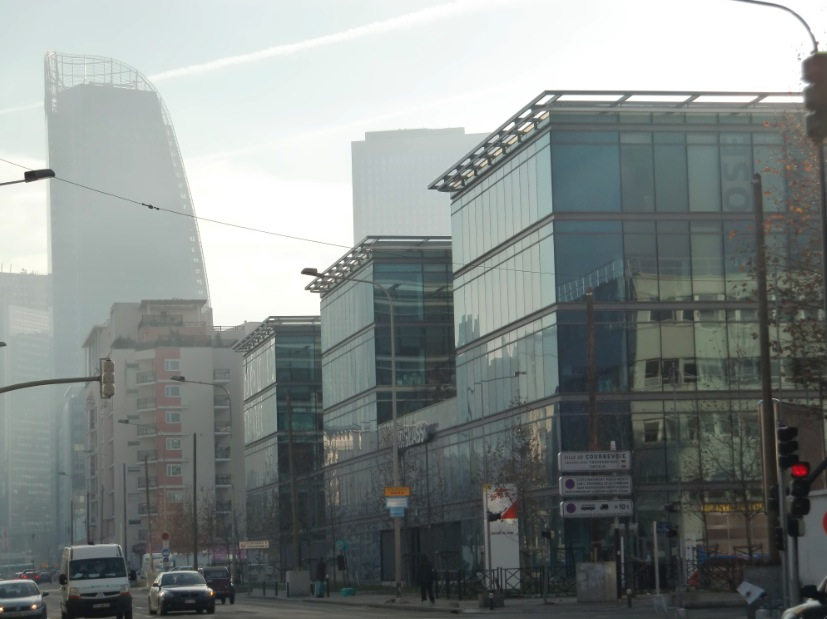
Carglass headquarters in the north of La Défense .

Carglass' headquarters are now located in France Courbevoie in Hauts-de-Seine, north of the La Défense business district.

Carglass had, at the end of December 2022, nearly 3000 employees, in more than 700 intervention centers and more than 350 workshop-vehicles.

The headquarters, in Courbevoie, also includes a car glass repair and replacement center, as well as the corporate repairer university. In 2014, Carglass created the first professional glass operator qualification certificate, recognized by automotive professionals.

Carglass' internal customer relations center is located at the Futuroscope Technopole in Poitiers, Vienne.

Since 2010, Carglass has invested in a CSR approach, promoting the repair of windshields instead of their replacement, recycling 100% of broken windshields and electrifying its fleet of workshop vehicles. The company is certified ISO 9001, ISO 14001 and ISO 45001 and has obtained the Gold Ecovadis seal.

== Ownership ==
Belron, the brand owner, has the following shareholders:

- D'Ieteren group
- Clayton, Dubilier & Rice
- Hellman & Friedman
- GIC
- BlackRock
- Management, employees and founding family.
