= Hein Vanhaezebrouck =

Belgian football manager and former player

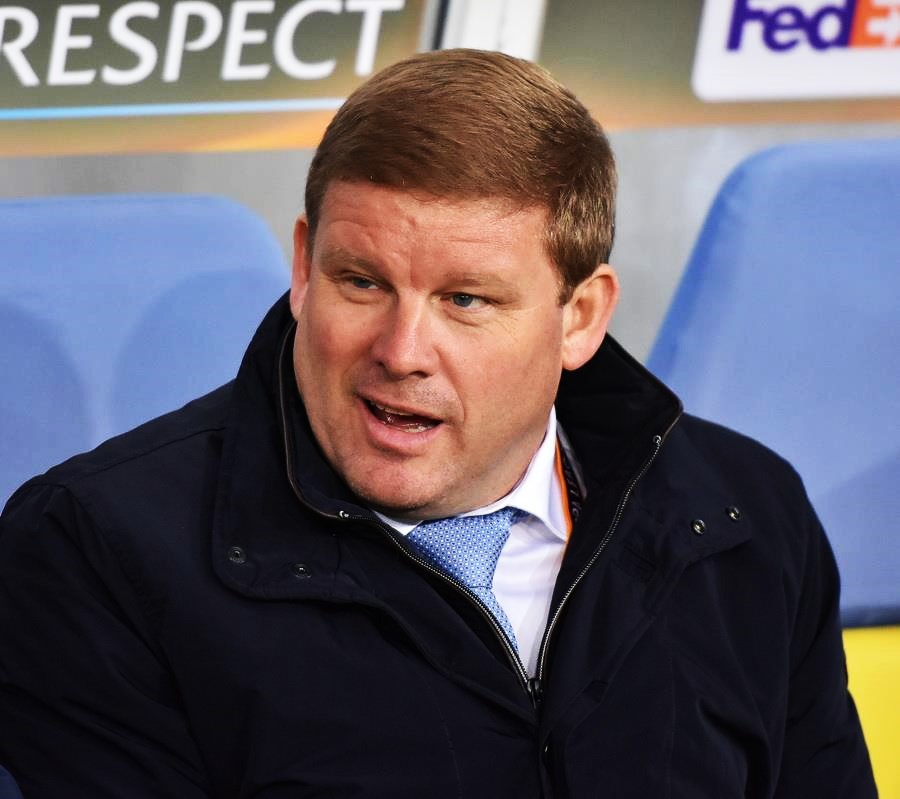
- Vanhaezebrouck in 2016

Personal information
- Date of birth: 16 February 1964 (age 62)
- Place of birth: Kortrijk, Belgium
- Position: Sweeper

Managerial career
- Years: Team
- 2000–2002: Lokeren (assistant)
- 2003: SWI Harelbeke
- 2003–2006: White Star Lauwe
- 2006–2009: Kortrijk
- 2009: Racing Genk
- 2010–2014: Kortrijk
- 2014–2017: Gent
- 2017–2018: Anderlecht
- 2020–2024: Gent

Hein Vanhaezebrouck (Dutch pronunciation: [ˈɦɛiɱ vɑnˈɦaːzəbruk]; born 16 February 1964) is a Belgian football manager. Most recently he was head coach of Belgian Pro League club K.A.A. Gent. He has a reputation of preferring an offensive style of play.

== Early life ==
Vanhaezebrouck was born in Kortrijk and raised in Lauwe.

== Career ==
Hein Vanhaezebrouck is a former player and played as a sweeper for KV Kortrijk, KRC Harelbeke and Sporting Lokeren, among other clubs.

Vanhaezebrouck left White Star Lauwe to become the coach of KV Kortrijk on 1 July 2006, replacing Manu Ferrera. In his first season, they played the promotion play offs en were beaten in de quarter final of the Belgian Cup by Club Bruges (2-1 & 1-1) In 2007–08 Vanhaezebrouck led Kortrijk to promotion to the first division by winning the second division title. In the Belgian Cup, Kortrijk were beaten in the quarter finals against KAA Gent, despite a 5–1 victory in the home game. KAA Gent expressed interest in him as a possible successor to Trond Sollied as head coach. However, at the end of April 2008, Vanhaezebrouck renewed his contract for two years (until 2010) at Kortrijk. He became well known for the acquisition of Google-striker Istvan Bakx. Vanhaezebrouck discovered Bakx using Google Search.

At the start of the 2009–10 season, Vanhaezebrouck went to KRC Genk. He was fired as coach of KRC Genk on 29 November 2009. At that time, Genk was 12th in the ranking after 16 games. His successor was Franky Vercauteren.

In June 2010, Vanhaezebrouck decided to return to KV Kortrijk for the 2010–11 season. The team finished tenth in the rankings. The following year, the team reached the champions play-off and the cup final, losing 1–0 against Sporting Lokeren. On 10 May 2013, it was announced that he had re-signed with KV Kortrijk.

In May 2014, he decided to leave KV Kortrijk for KAA Gent. There, he reached his biggest success, as he won, after his championships with Kortrijk in Second Division, also the championship with Gent in First Division in 2015, after a 2-0 victory against Standard Liège, and met European success with KAA Gent, in both the UEFA Champions League, reaching the 2nd round (season 2015-2016), and in the UEFA Europa League, reaching the 3rd round (season 2016-2017).

In October 2017 Vanhaezebrouck signed for RSC Anderlecht. The first season he brought Anderlecht from 8th place to 2nd place. The next season the club was taken over by a new owner. The second year they started very well but due to injuries the club fell back to 4th position, reason for the new owner to sack Vanhaezebrouck on 17 December 2018

In 2000 Vanhaezebrouck started working as a pundit for Belgian and European football and during the 2006 World Cup, he was an analyst and commenter on VT4, and has since 2016 served as analyst on Sporting Telenet, Dazn and Sporza and also for the 2022 World Cup and the 2024 European Championship.

== Managerial statistics ==
As of match played 2 June 2024

Managerial record by team and tenure
Team	Nat	From	To	Record							
Team	Nat	From	To	G	W	D	L	GF	GA	GD	Win %
Kortrijk	(Belgium)	1 July 2006	29 May 2009	122	57	31	34	203	158	+45	46.72
Genk	(Belgium)	29 May 2009	29 November 2009	18	5	5	8	22	25	−3	27.78
Kortrijk	(Belgium)	6 June 2010	1 July 2014	169	63	41	65	212	208	+4	37.28
Gent	(Belgium)	1 July 2014	27 September 2017	168	82	45	41	266	184	+82	48.81
Anderlecht	(Belgium)	3 October 2017	17 December 2018	62	26	11	25	87	93	−6	41.94
Gent	(Belgium)	4 December 2020	30 June 2024	206	107	44	55	378	210	+168	51.94
Career totals				745	340	177	228	1,168	878	+290	45.64

== Honours ==
=== Manager ===
AA Gent

- Belgian Pro League: 2014–15
- Belgian Cup: 2021–22
- Belgian Super Cup: 2015

=== Individual ===
- Belgian Professional Manager of the Year: 2011-12
- Belgian Sports Coach of the Year: 2015,
- Best Football Coach of the Year: 2015
- Guy Thys Award: 2015
- Raymond Goethals Award: 2015, 2023
- Honorary citizen of Menen: 2015
