= Michel Ribeiro =

Belgian footballer (born 1975)

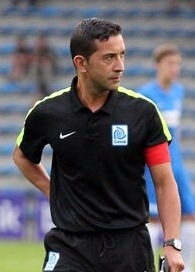

Personal information
- Date of birth: 29 November 1975 (age 50)
- Place of birth: Belgium
- Position: Midfielder

Senior career*
Years	Team	Apps	(Gls)
1996–1997	Genk	1	(0)
1997–1998	Patro Eisden		
1998–1999	Telstar	21	(5)
1999–2000	FC Den Bosch	8	(0)
- * Club domestic league appearances and goals

Michel Ribeiro (born 29 November 1975) is a Belgian former footballer who played as a midfielder.

== Early life ==
Ribeiro was born in 1975 in Belgium. He joined the youth academy of Belgian side Genk at the age of six.

== Career ==
In 1998, Ribeiro signed for Dutch side Telstar. He retired from professional football at the age of twenty-eight due to injury.

== Style of play ==
Ribeiro mainly operated as a midfielder. He specifically operated as an attacking midfielder.

== Personal life ==
Ribeiro was born in Belgium to Portuguese parents. His wife is Dutch. His son Diego Ribeiro was also a footballer in Belgium.
