= Felice Mazzù =

Belgian football manager (born 1966)

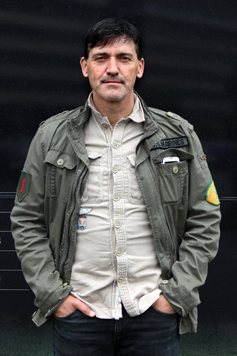
- Mazzù in 2015

Personal information
- Date of birth: 12 March 1966 (age 60)
- Place of birth: Charleroi, Belgium
- Height: 1.83 m (6 ft 0 in)

Youth career
- 1973–1986: Charleroi

Senior career*
Years	Team	Apps	(Gls)
1990–1991	UJS Charleroi		
1991–1992	FC Jumet		
1992–1996	Moustier		
1996	RC Sartois		

Managerial career
- 1998–2000: RA Marchiennoise
- 2000–2006: RCS Brainois
- 2006–2007: Léopold Uccle-Woluwe
- 2009–2010: Tubize
- 2010–2013: White Star Woluwe
- 2013–2019: Charleroi
- 2019: Genk
- 2020–2022: Union Saint-Gilloise
- 2022: Anderlecht
- 2022–2024: Charleroi
- 2024–2025: Sint-Truiden
- 2025–2026: OH Leuven
- 2026–: Eupen
- * Club domestic league appearances and goals

Felice Mazzù (born 12 March 1966) is a Belgian professional football manager, currently managing Challenger Pro League club Eupen.

Mazzù has built a reputation for improving the status of smaller clubs, earning several promotions with regional sides, before helping Charleroi qualify for the Belgian Pro League title play-offs three times. He is also known for spotting and nurturing young talented players, such as Victor Osimhen, Paul Onuachu, Kaoru Mitoma, Deniz Undav and Dante Vanzeir.

His most famous spell in management saw him guide Union Saint-Gilloise back to the Belgian top-flight in 2021 after 48 years away, before bringing them to the brink of the title in their first season back in the top division.

Mazzù has also had brief spells in charge of Racing Genk and Anderlecht, leaving both clubs within six months of appointment, with both mid-table.

In total, he has previously been in charge of RCS Nivellois, RA Marchiennoise des Sports, RCS Brainois, Léopold Uccle-Woluwe, Tubize, White Star Woluwe, Charleroi, Genk, Union SG and Anderlecht.

== Coaching career ==
=== Lower division beginnings ===
A youth team coach for RCS Nivellois during his playing days in lower-league and amateur football in the 1990s, Mazzù first came to attention while T2 (assistant coach) at Tubize during the 2008–09 season, working under Albert Cartier, whom Mazzù succeeded the following season.

After one year in change at Tubize, Mazzù was recruited by Brussels club White Star Woluwe in the summer of 2010, and immediately guided White Star from Division 3 to promotion to the Second Division (now Challenger Pro League) in his very first season in charge, in tandem to also guiding them to quarter-finals of the 2010-11 Belgian Cup.

During the 2012–2013 season, the club won the first phase of the Second Division championship, guaranteeing them a place in the "final round", playing-off for promotion to the top division in Belgium, the Pro League. Despite a good start to the season, White Star Woluwe faced severe financial difficulties and was placed into liquidation in April 2013. It was only thanks to the unexpected intervention of a group of investors from Dubai that the club earned a temporary reprieve to contest the final play-offs, but without Mazzù, who left the club.

During that season, Mazzù had attracted the interest of Standard Liege to succeed Dutch coach Ron Jans in October 2012, but Standard's overtures were rejected, as they would be again two years later.

=== Charleroi ===
Instead, Mazzù was appointed Charleroi coach in 2013 after his five years of impressing with clubs in the lower divisions of the Belgian League.

Charleroi finished tenth in Mazzù's first season in charge in 2013–14, and after this, the Zebras under Mazzù would consistently be a top-ten Belgian League club, finishing in the top six three times in four seasons, allowing them to contest the title play-offs. Charleroi's best finish in this period was fifth in both 2015 and 2017, the latter achievement earning him the Raymond Goethals Trophy for Coach of the Year.

Mazzu was once more approached by Standard Liege to become their coach, following the sacking of Guy Luzon in October 2014, but again Mazzu stayed put.

In his final season at Charleroi, Mazzù signed Victor Osimhen on loan from Wolfsburg, at that stage having not scored in European football, with a return of no goals from 16 appearances for the Bundesliga side. Osimhen would score 20 goals for Charleroi in that 2018-19 campaign, before joining the Zebras permanently in the summer of 2019 ahead of a €16 million move to Lille.

=== Genk ===
Reigning champions Racing Genk brought him to Limburg in 2019 after their title-winning coach Philippe Clement had returned to his former side Club Brugge. Among Mazzu's signings was Nigerian striker Paul Onuachu from Danish side Midtjylland, who would follow up his first campaign of 10 goals with a 20-year high for the Pro League of 33 the following season (35 in all competitions).

However, a poor start to their title defence allied with Genk's early UEFA Champions League exit in 2019–20, finishing fourth in a group also containing Liverpool, Napoli and a Salzburg side containing Erling Haaland and Takumi Minamino, saw Mazzù dismissed.

=== Union Saint-Gilloise ===
After eight months out of football, second-flight side Union St Gilloise brought Mazzù back into the game, igniting a remarkable two-year spell where Union would win the First Division B title, and after promotion to the Belgian Pro League, would lead the title race from October to May before being overtaken by Club Brugge in the final week-and-a-half of the title play-offs, losing home and away to Club in their title-deciding meetings.

A team containing lower-division imports and previous top-flight campaigners such as Dante Vanzeir, Deniz Undav, Teddy Teuma, Anthony Moris and Loïc Lapoussin helped Union SG to an 18-point margin over Seraing at the top of the 2020-21 Belgian First Division B (now Challenger Pro League), bringing the team back to the highest division for the first time since 1973.

A return to top-flight football after 48 years away saw a 3-1 opening-day win away to Brussels' traditional giants Anderlecht, and a week later, Union hosted reigning champions Club Brugge on 1 August 2021 in their first home game in the top division since 1973, being edged out 1-0 through a late Eduard Sobol winner.

Union went top of the Pro League on 17 October 2021, passing previous leaders Eupen by virtue of a 4–1 win over Seraing.

In a January run against all of the previous season's top four, Union beat Anderlecht, Genk and Royal Antwerp, drawing 0–0 away to Club Brugge. By the end of the regular season, Union was top on 77 points, five ahead of Club Brugge, with Antwerp and Anderlecht also qualifying for the six rounds of play-offs, where the quartet would bring forward half of the regular season points into the play-offs. Hence, Union would resume on 39, Club 36, with Anderlecht and Antwerp both on 32.

Union started the play-offs by beating Anderlecht 3-1. A 0–0 draw away to Antwerp saw the lead over Club Brugge maintained at three points.

The title race swung in the direction of Bruges in back-to-back games between Union and Club, with the champions earning a tight 2–0 win in Brussels to draw level on points, with Club going top under the "half-points" rule, as Union had needed their tally from the regular season rounded-up. Club Brugge won the midweek return 1–0 at the Jan Breydel through a rebounded own goal from goalkeeper Anthony Moris to take a three-point lead with two games to go. A late equalizer from Casper Nielsen was disallowed by VAR for offside.

Club Brugge clinched the league crown in their next (and penultimate) game against Royal Antwerp, despite Union beating Anderlecht for the fourth time in the season 2–0 at Lotto Park. Eventually, Union finished four points down on Club in second place, with 46 points compared to Club's 50, historically qualifying Union for the UEFA Champions League.

League glory for Union would have seen them become the first newly promoted side to win a top-20 European national league championship at the first attempt since Kaiserslautern's 1998 Bundesliga success.

Mazzu was honoured with four coaching awards - the Belgian Golden Shoe for 2021, the Raymond Goethals Trophy (his second), the Guy Thys Award voted for by his fellow coaches, and Belgian Pro League Coach of the Year for 2021–22. During their run for the title, Mazzu gained a reputation for dancing in front of Union's fans post-match, cited as keeping a light atmosphere within the club and maintaining a close relationship with the Union support.

Union's runners-up spot qualified them for the UEFA Champions League qualifiers, sending them into European football for the first time since 1964–65, and their first UEFA competition after featuring in five editions of the Fairs Cup in the 1950s and 60s.

After going into first place in October, Union was at the top for 200 consecutive days.

=== Controversial move to Anderlecht, then Charleroi again ===
The Unionistes' impressive run to becoming Brussels' top club attracted interest across the capital, and within days of being named Pro League Coach of the Year for 2022, Mazzu was photographed speaking in a restaurant to representatives of Anderlecht, who had just decided to dismiss Vincent Kompany.

After a week's tug-of-war between the two clubs, Anderlecht announced that they had signed Mazzù as their new head coach on 31 May. Anderlecht's move meant they had to pay Union compensation, sparking ill-feeling between the two Brussels clubs. However, Union got their revenge by defeating Mazzu's new club in their first meeting since his departure, barely a month into the new season at the Joseph Marien Stadium on 28 August 2022.

But amid major in-house politicking and a poor start to the season, Mazzù was sacked on 24 October 2022 in the aftermath of an abandoned match away to Standard Liège due to Anderlecht fan unrest. The Mauves were 12th, five points above the relegation zone.

Within a month, Mazzù was re-appointed as Charleroi coach, having first made his name as a top-flight coach there from 2013 to 2019, rescuing them from a relegation dogfight and bringing them into the European play-off positions with a week to go in the season. However, a draw against league leaders Genk would see them marginally miss out on play-offs football.

The following 2023-24 season was a struggle, with Charleroi losing Belgium international Joris Kayembe to Genk, alongside the departures of attackers Amirhossein Hosseinzadeh, Jackson Tchatchoua and Ali Gholizadeh. Charleroi was in the bottom six for all but two weeks of the season, and a 5–0 loss on the final night of the regular season at KAA Gent saw the Zebras condemned to the relegation play-offs. Mazzu was dismissed the following day, and replaced by Rik De Mil.

=== Sint-Truiden ===
On 5 September 2024, Mazzù was announced as the new head coach of Sint-Truiden. He recorded two wins in as many games for the team since his appointment.

== Personal life ==
Mazzù was born in Charleroi to an Italian father from Calabria.

His brother, Antonino Mazzù, is a Professor of Philosophy at the Université Libre de Bruxelles. Sister Pasqualina works in biopharmacy and led a team that produced vaccines during the 2020 COVID-19 crisis.

== Managerial statistics ==
As of match played 12 April 2025

Managerial record by team and tenure
Team	From	To	Record					Ref.
Team	From	To	P	W	D	L	Win %	Ref.
Tubize	May 2009	7 May 2010	37	9	15	13	24.32	
White Star Woluwe	1 September 2010	19 April 2013	107	54	22	31	50.47	
Charleroi	2 May 2013	3 June 2019	260	107	68	85	41.15	
Genk	3 June 2019	12 November 2019	20	8	3	9	40.00	
Union SG	24 May 2020	24 June 2022	72	50	10	12	69.44	
Anderlecht	24 June 2022	24 October 2022	21	9	2	10	42.86	
Charleroi	10 December 2022	21 March 2024	48	16	13	19	33.33	
Sint-Truiden	3 September 2024	10 April 2025	31	12	7	12	38.71	
Total			594	263	140	191	44.28	—

== Honours ==
White Star Woluwe

- Belgian Third Division: 2010–11

Genk

- Belgian Super Cup: 2019

Union SG

- Belgian First Division A: 2021–22 runners-up
- Belgian First Division B: 2020–21

Individual

- Belgian Professional Manager of the Season: 2021–22
- Belgian Golden Shoe: Best Coach of the Calendar Year: 2017, 2021
- Raymond Goethals Award: 2017, 2021
- Guy Thys Award: 2021-22
