= Soudal =

Belgian chemicals company

Soudal N.V.
- Company type: Private
- Industry: Building materials, chemicals
- Founded: 1966
- Headquarters: Turnhout, Belgium
- Key people: Vic Swerts, Chairman Dirk Coorevits, CEO
- Products: Sealants, Adhesives and PU Foams
- Revenue: € 1,100 million (2021)
- Number of employees: 3,654 (Dec. 2021)
- Website: www.soudalgroup.com

Soudal is a Belgian company whose headquarters is located in Turnhout (Belgium). The company has developed into one of the most important independent producers of silicone and caulks (silicone, polyurethane, marine sealants, acrylics), polyurethane-foams, and adhesives in Europe.

Soudal has a consolidated turnover of 911 million EUR (2021), and the company distributes its products to more than 140 countries. The company is active in three markets: professional construction, do-it-yourself (DIY) hardware stores and industrial applications. The company is still fully owned by Vic Swerts who founded the company in 1966.

In 2014, Soudal partnered with Lotto to sponsor the team at Tour de France. In April 2020, Riders for the Lotto-Soudal team voluntarily waived part of their wages as a gesture of solidarity due to the COVID-19 pandemic.

== History ==
In 1966, Vic Swerts bought a small producer of welding materials and of polyester putties for the repair of damaged car bodies, located near the Antwerp Ossenmarkt (E: ox market). Two years later, he moved his company to Turnhout, at the location of the former market garden of his parents. He then invested heavily in a sophisticated vacuum mixer for the production of polyester putties and high quality silicone sealants as a competitor to the (much cheaper) knifing filler. In 1976, he moved to the industrial area of Turnhout and renamed the company Soudal (from Soudeert Alles, E: welds everything).

In 1993, a heavy fire destroyed the factory in Turnhout, which was rebuilt within a year (Plant 1). A second production plant was built nearby (Plant 2). Plant 2 is the biggest production site of Polyurethane-Foams worldwide. In 1997, Vic Swerts acquired BAVG from Bayer, a company specialized in finished construction products. Since its acquisition, the factory in Leverkusen doubled its production. In September 2004 he acquired his competitor Rectavit in Drongen. Rectavit continued to operate as an independent entity. In 1999, Soudal opened a sales office and storage space in Shanghai. In 2005 the company opened offices in Turkey, Norway and Portugal.

In 2011, Soudal opened its 11th production unit through the establishment of a joint venture with the McCoy Group from New Delhi, India. Soudal entered into E-commerce in India via McCoy Soudal by selling on Amazon India, ShopClues, Snapdeal, McCoy Mart and IndustryKart.

== See also ==
- Soudal Quick-Step

== Sources ==
- (in Dutch) Soudal bouwt fabriek in Polen
- (in Dutch) Wij doen gewoon ons best (Dutch)
- (in Dutch) SOUDAL: meer dan alleen 500.000 kokers silicone per dag
