= Cegeka =

Belgian information technology company

- Type: Private
- Industry: IT; Software; Consulting
- Founded: 1992
- Founder: André Knaepen; Herman van Halen
- Headquarters: Hasselt, Belgium
- Key people: Koen Deryckere (CEO); André Knaepen (chairman)
- Revenue: €744,000,000 (2021); €640,000,000 (2024); €1,300,000,000 (2024)
- Number of employees: 9,000
- Website: https://www.cegeka.com/

Cegeka is a European provider of IT solutions, services and consultancy. The company was founded in 1992 and has data centers in Hasselt, Belgium and Geleen, the Netherlands. Anno 2026 CEO Koen Deryckere leads the company from its headquarters in Hasselt. The group has over 9,000 employees and achieved a consolidated turnover of 1.3 billion euros in 2024.

== History ==
The Cegeka IT company was created as part of the Kempen Coal Mines (KS) reconversion plan. It was originally a joint venture between CSC, investment company Gimv and the KS. The name Cegeka is derived from the initial letters C, G and K of the founders. In 1992 Cegeka was split up: the computer center continued under the name VCST Computer Services, the software department with about 30 employees was taken over by then IT managers André Knaepen and Herman van Halen and continued under the name Cegeka. In 1996, following a capital increase by VCST Special Products, in which he had acquired the majority, Knaepen gained control of Cegeka and it became a family business.

Cegeka grew strongly through several acquisitions. In 1996, Cegeka took over the company ConnectIT. In 2000, the company, which supplies a lot of software to hospitals through its subsidiary Cegeka HealthCare Systems, already had 220 employees. In 2003, the company was named a Trends Gazelle by the weekly Trends magazine. It had sales of 22 million euros and supplied software to several large companies. In 2004 HostIT joined the Cegeka group and in 2006 followed the important acquisition of Ardatis, a company specializing in IT solutions for the social sector. In the same year, with a turnover of 40 million euros and a staff of 350, it received this award again. At the time, it had just acquired the Antwerp software company Cortex. In 2009, Cegeka became a major player in Wallonia thanks to a participation in NSI.

In 2010, Cegeka received the Ambiorix Prize from entrepreneurial organization VKW Limburg. This is the most important award that companies in the province of Limburg can receive.

In 2015, Cegeka acquired Edan Business Solutions, which specializes in ERP solutions. Cegeka did not remain active only within the Belgian borders. For example, the company acquired Databalk in 2007. This was followed later by, among others, the company Inside in Romania in 2012 and Brain Force Software GmbH and Brain Force S.P.A. in 2014, making Cegeka active in Germany, Italy, the Czech Republic and Slovakia. In 2016, it increased its footprint in Italy, Austria and Germany thanks to the acquisition of Danube IT. In addition, Cegeka and the UZ Leuven established a joint venture with nexuzHealth.

In 2020, Cegeka acquired KPN Consulting from KPN, becoming a major player in the Dutch market.

In December 2020, Cegeka took a majority stake in Bruges-based network specialist Citymesh.

In June 2021, Cegeka acquired digital school platform Smartschool used in many Belgian schools.

In October 2021, Cegeka acquired cybersecurity specialist SecurIT, an IT specialist in identity and access management headquartered in Amsterdam, Netherlands.

In August 2023, it was announced Cegeka had acquired the Buffalo-headquartered digital transformation company, CTG for $107 million.

== 5G ==
In February 2020, Cegeka applied for a temporary 5G license. In March 2020, Cegeka was one of five companies to which Belgian telecom regulator BIPT granted a temporary 5G license. With Etropia Investments, the company was considered an outsider to the three major mobile operators Telenet, Proximus and Orange.

In May 2020, Cegeka acquired Walloon telecom operator Gridmax. Cegeka had previously shown interest in the 3.5GHz band and, with the acquisition, gained access to that spectrum band even before traditional telecom operators.

In December 2020, Cegeka took a majority stake in Bruges-based network specialist Citymesh, which in turn received a capital increase. The auction of the 5G spectrum will not take place until the summer of 2022. With the acquisition, Cegeka became the fourth mobile operator of Belgium, albeit only for companies.

== See also ==
- Cegeka Arena
