= Nicky Hayen =

Belgian footballer and manager

Personal information
- Date of birth: 16 August 1980 (age 46)
- Place of birth: Sint-Truiden, Belgium
- Height: 1.88 m (6 ft 2 in)
- Position: Defender

Youth career
- –1999: Sint-Truiden

Senior career*
Years	Team	Apps	(Gls)
1999–2008	Sint-Truiden	243	(4)
2008–2010	RBC Roosendaal	62	(5)
2010–2013	Oud-Heverlee Leuven	40	(3)
2012–2013	→ Antwerp (loan)	0	(0)
2013–2014	Dender	0	(0)
Total		345	(12)

Managerial career
- 2013–2014: Dender
- 2014: Zwarte Leeuw
- 2015–2016: KVK Tienen
- 2016–2017: ASV Geel
- 2017–2018: Berchem Sport
- 2019–2020: Sint-Truiden (caretaker)
- 2020–2021: Waasland-Beveren
- 2021–2022: Haverfordwest County
- 2022–2024: Club NXT
- 2024–2025: Club Brugge
- 2025–2026: Genk
- 2026: Burnley
- * Club domestic league appearances and goals

Nicky Hayen (born 16 August 1980) is a Belgian professional football manager and former player who was most recently the head coach of EFL Championship club Burnley.

== Career ==
=== Playing Career and Player coaching ===
From 1999 on, Hayen played nine seasons at the highest level of Belgian professional football with Sint-Truiden, before moving to RBC Roosendaal in the second division in the Netherlands for two seasons. He returned to Belgium in 2010 by joining Oud-Heverlee Leuven and was part of the team achieving promotion to the Belgian Pro League. In the summer of 2012, he was loaned out for one season to Antwerp, but when the season ended he was released and became player-coach at Dender EH in the Belgian Third Division In February 2014, he was relieved of his coaching duties at Dender EH due to poor results, but stayed with the team as a player.

Haverfordwest County

On 31 December 2021, Hayen was announced as manager of Cymru Premier club Haverfordwest County on an initial 18-month contract. This was extended for a further 12 months upon confirmation of safety towards the end of the 2021–22 season, after an excellent run of form. Hayen was the first Belgian manager to work in the Cymru Premier. He left the club in June 2022 to return to Belgium to take up a position as manager of Club Brugge's under-23 team, Club NXT.

=== Club Brugge ===
On 18 March 2024, he was appointed as caretaker manager of Club Brugge, following the dismissal of Ronny Deila. Hayen turned Brugge's fortunes around, and won the Belgian championship after a 0–0 draw against Cercle Brugge. He signed a permanent deal as coach of Club Brugge on 3 June 2024. Hayen was dismissed on 8 December 2025.

=== Burnley ===
On 10 July 2026, Hayen signed with EFL Championship club Burnley on a 3-year deal. Burnley sacked Hayen after their defeat against Lincoln City on 24 October 2026.

He won just 1 of 14 competitive games as Head Coach of Burnley and was dismissed after just 3 months in the role.

== Managerial statistics ==
As of match played 24 October 2026

Managerial record by team and tenure
Team	Nat	From	To	Record							
Team	Nat	From	To	G	W	D	L	GF	GA	GD	Win %
ASV Geel	(Belgium)	1 July 2016	16 October 2017	42	20	5	17	74	58	+16	47.62
Berchem Sport	(Belgium)	15 November 2017	24 January 2018	7	0	1	6	7	16	−9	0.00
Sint-Truiden	(Belgium)	25 November 2019	2 January 2020	6	1	1	4	5	13	−8	16.67
Waasland-Beveren	(Belgium)	1 July 2020	30 June 2021	38	9	8	21	52	79	−27	23.68
Haverfordwest County	(Wales)	31 December 2021	1 May 2022	15	6	4	5	29	16	+13	40.00
Club Brugge	(Belgium)	18 March 2024	8 December 2025	102	61	20	21	199	114	+85	59.80
Genk	(Belgium)	22 December 2025	10 July 2026	28	13	9	6	46	38	+8	46.43
Burnley	(England)	10 July 2026	24 October 2026	14	1	7	6	18	26	−8	7.14
Career total				252	111	55	86	430	360	+70	44.05

== Honours ==
=== Player ===
Oud-Heverlee Leuven

- Belgian Second Division: 2010–11

=== Manager ===
Club Brugge

- Belgian Pro League: 2023–24
- Belgian Cup: 2024–25
- Belgian Super Cup: 2025

=== Individual ===
- Raymond Goethals Trophy: 2024
- Belgian Golden Shoe Coach of the Year: 2024
