= Vdk bank =

Belgian commercial bank

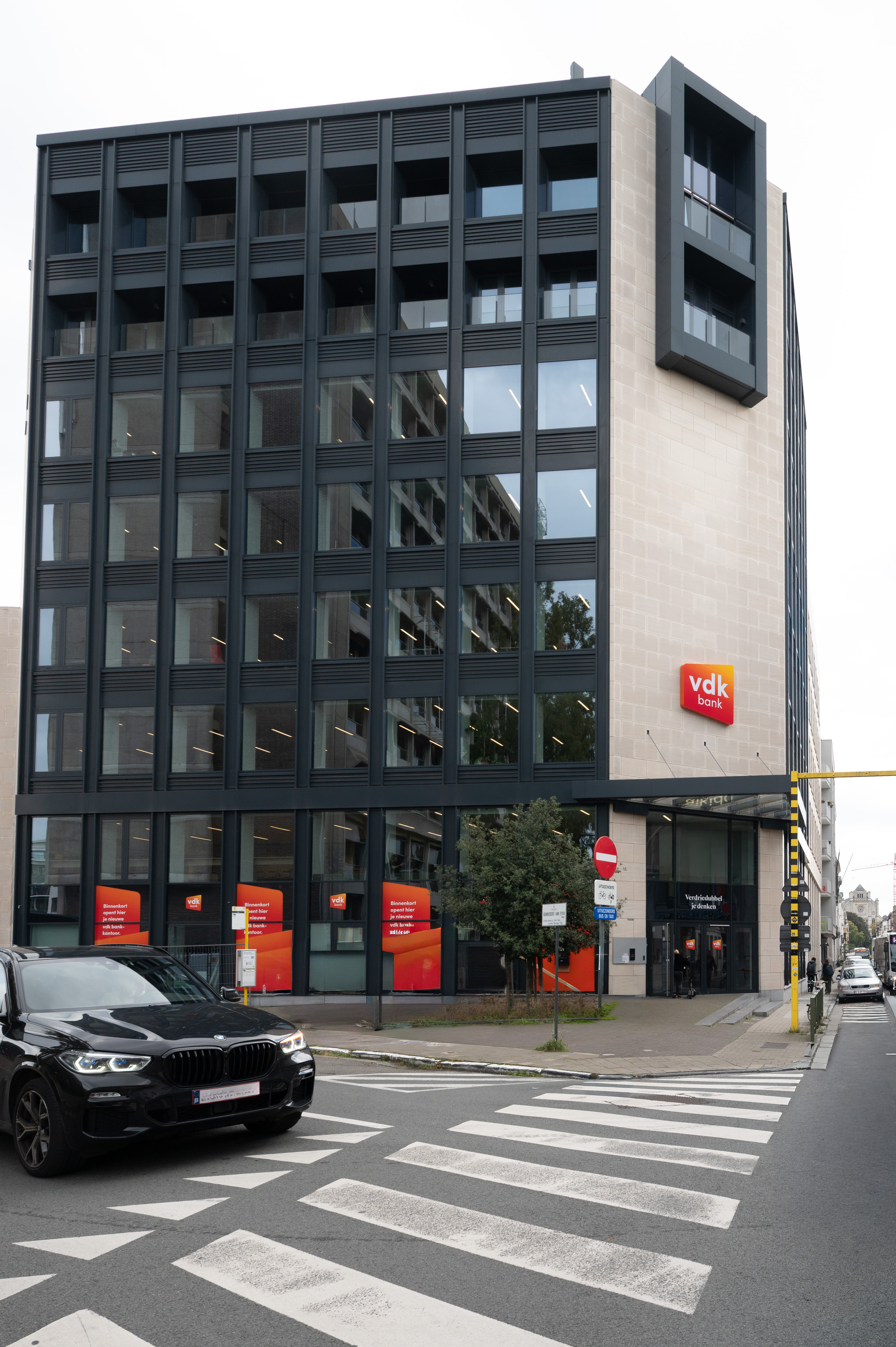
vdk bank head office, since 2025, in Ghent

vdk bank, formerly Volksdepositokas ("People's Savings Bank") then VDK Spaarbank, is a Belgian commercial bank.

vdk bank presents itself as an ethical bank. The bank used to be the principal commercial sponsor of the professional football club KAA Gent and the female volleyball team VDK bank Gent.

== See also ==
- List of banks in the euro area
- List of banks in Belgium
