= Freyr Alexandersson =

Icelandic footballer and coach

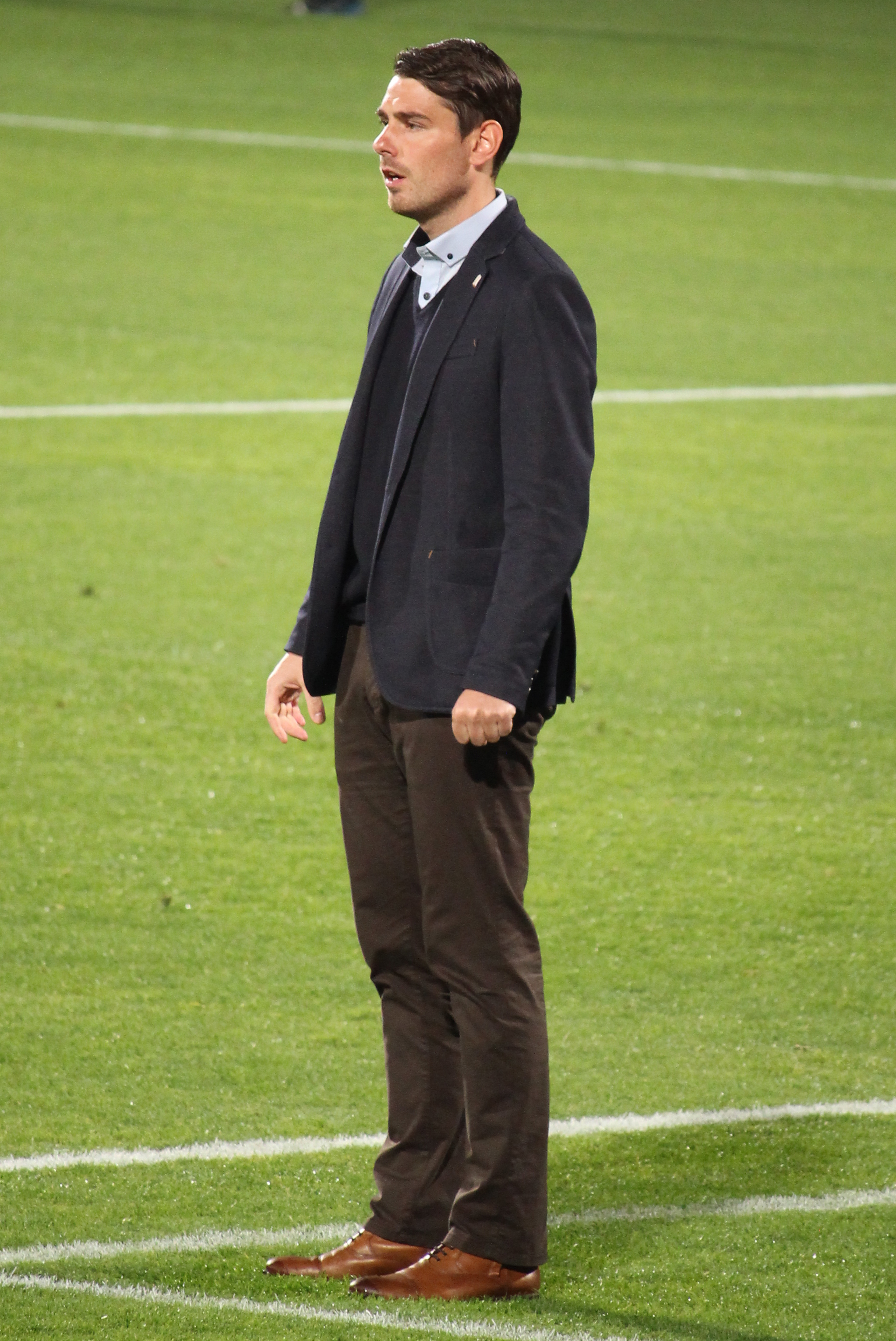
- Freyr in 2014

Personal information
- Date of birth: 18 November 1982 (age 44)
- Place of birth: Reykjavík, Iceland
- Position: Defender

Team information
- Current team: Rosenborg (head coach)

Youth career
- –2001: Leiknir Reykjavík

Senior career*
Years	Team	Apps	(Gls)
2001–2007	Leiknir Reykjavík	72	(1)
2008	KB	1	(0)
Total		73	(1)

Managerial career
- 2008: Valur (women)
- 2009–2010: Valur (women)
- 2011–2012: Valur (assistant)
- 2013–2015: Leiknir Reykjavík
- 2013–2018: Iceland women
- 2018–2020: Iceland (assistant)
- 2020–2021: Al-Arabi (assistant)
- 2021–2024: Lyngby
- 2024: Kortrijk
- 2025–2026: Brann
- 2026–: Rosenborg
- * Club domestic league appearances and goals

Freyr Alexandersson (born 18 November 1982) is an Icelandic football coach and former player. He is the head coach of Rosenborg. He was the manager of the Icelandic women's national football team from 2013 to 2018.

== Playing career ==
Freyr came up through the junior ranks of Leiknir Reykjavík where he played 81 league and cup matches.

== Managerial career ==
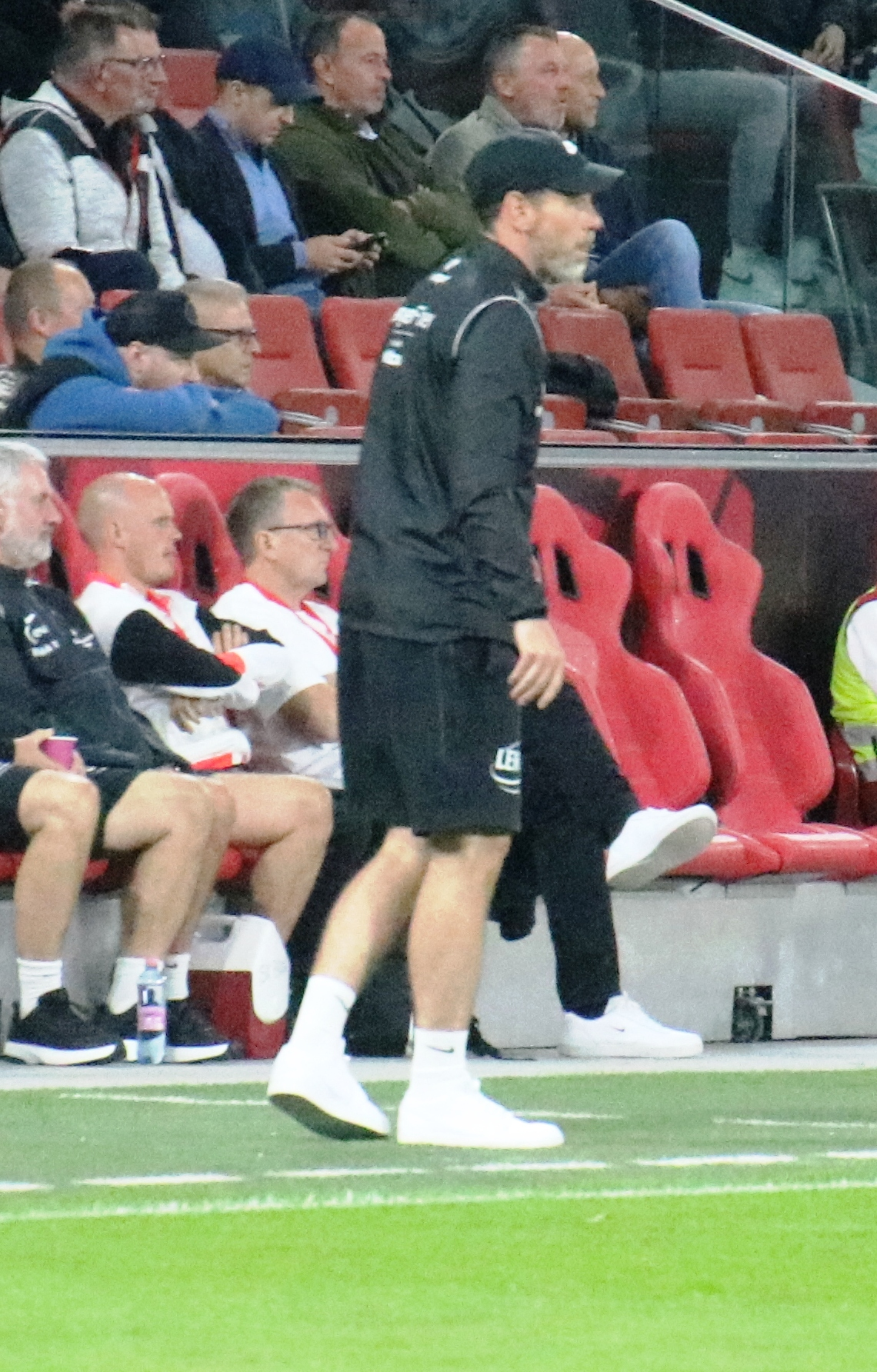
Freyr as manager of Brann in 2025

Freyr started his coaching career as a girls youth team coach at Leiknir Reykjavík. In 2006, he started as a youth coach for girls at Valur.

=== Valur women's and men's team ===
Freyr assisted Valur women's team manager Elísabet Gunnarsdóttir in the summer of 2007; in September that year, Freyr decided to retire from playing football and became joint manager of Valur women's team alongside Elísabet. Freyr and Elísabet won the Úrvalsdeild kvenna in 2008; after that season, Elísabet left to go to Sweden, and Freyr took over as manager. The next two years, Freyr would win the Úrvaldeild two times and also the Icelandic Women's Football Cup two times. After his time at Valur women's Freyr served an assistant manager for Valur men's team for two seasons.

=== Leiknir Reykjavík ===
After having appeared for the club as a player Freyr returned to Leiknir for the 2013 season, this time as joint manager of the 1. deild karla team, alongside Davíð Snorri Jónasson. In their first season Leiknir finished in 7th place. In his second season as joint manager, Freyr managed to steer Leiknir to promotion to the first tier of Icelandic football for the first time in Leiknir's 41-year-old history. Winning the 1. deild karla with 48 points. In their first-ever Úrvaldeild karla match on 3 May 2015, Leiknir defeated Valur 3–0 at Hlíðarendi. However, they could not manage to keep Leiknir in the Úrvalsdeild and were relegated at the end of the season. In the last game of the season Freyr and Davíð announced that they would not return for the next season.

=== Icelandic women's national team ===
In September 2013, Freyr was appointed manager of the Icelandic women's national team, combining the role with his existing job at 1. deild karla club Leiknir Reykjavík.

With Margrét Lára Viðarsdóttir on maternity leave, Freyr appointed Sara Björk Gunnarsdóttir as Iceland's new team captain in January 2014.

On 4 September 2018, he announced that he was stepping down as manager of the team after it failed to make the 2019 FIFA Women's World Cup.

=== Icelandic men's national team ===
Freyr served as a game analyst for the Icelandic men's national team during the 2018 World Cup. On 8 August 2018, Freyr was appointed as assistant manager to the new Icelandic national football team manager Erik Hamrén on a two-year contract.

=== Lyngby ===
In June 2021 he became the new manager of the Danish 1st Division club Lyngby. With Freyr as manager, Lyngby finished as runner up of the season, earning the club a promotion to the top level in Danish football, Superligaen. In the 2022-23 season, Freyr's team were last in the table with only one win at the winter break; they completed a comeback and avoided relegation in the last game of the season against fellow relegation candidates Horsens.

=== Kortrijk ===
On 4 January 2024, it was announced that Freyr would become the new coach of Kortrijk. He was tasked with avoiding relegation for the South West-Flanders-based team, who were at that time placed firmly at the bottom of the Jupiler League. Freyr and the team succeeded with the mission, as they gained enough points to avoid direct relegation, eventually winning two deciding play-off matches against Lommel to stay in the Belgish top tier.

=== Brann ===
On 13 January 2025, Freyr was announced as the new manager of Brann. On 1 June 2026, Freyr was sacked by the club.

=== Rosenborg ===
Two-and-a-half weeks after he left Brann, Freyr was announced as the new head coach of fellow Eliteserien side Rosenborg. He signed a contract through the 2029 season.

== Managerial statistics (all official matches) ==
As of match played 22 November 2026

Team	Nat	From	To	Record					Ref.
Team	Nat	From	To	P	W	D	L	Win %	Ref.
Iceland women	(Iceland)	2 September 2013	4 September 2018	54	27	9	18	50.00	
Lyngby	(Denmark)	28 June 2021	5 January 2024	89	34	24	31	38.20	
Kortrijk	(Belgium)	6 January 2024	17 December 2024	38	14	5	19	36.84	
Brann	(Norway)	13 January 2025	1 June 2026	65	31	10	24	47.69	
Rosenborg	(Norway)	17 June 2026	Present	19	14	2	3	73.68	
Total				265	120	50	95	45.3	—

== Honours ==
=== As player ===
Leiknir R.

- 2. deild karla: 2005

=== As manager ===
Valur women's

- Úrvalsdeild kvenna: 2008, 2009, 2010
- Icelandic Women's Football Cup: 2009, 2010

Leiknir R.

- 1. deild karla: 2014

Individual

- Eliteserien Coach of the Month: August/September 2025
