= 2022–23 in Belgian football =

Football in Belgium
- Season: 2022–23

Men's football
- Pro League: Antwerp
- Challenger Pro League: RWD Molenbeek
- National Division 1: Patro Eisden
- Division 2: Lokeren-Temse (VV A); Cappellen (VV B); Warnant (ACFF)
- Division 3: Overijse (VV A); Wezel (VV B); Mons (ACFF A); Rochefort (ACFF B)
- Cup: Antwerp
- Super Cup: Club Brugge

The following article is a summary of the 2022–23 football season in Belgium, which was the 120th season of competitive football in the country and ran from July 2022 until June 2023.

== National teams ==
=== Belgium national football team ===
==== Results and fixtures ====
===== Friendlies =====
18 November 2022	Belgium	1–2	Egypt	Kuwait City, Kuwait
16:00	Openda 76'	Report	M. Mohamed 33'; Trézéguet 46'	Stadium: Jaber Al-Ahmad International Stadium; Referee: Ali Shaban (Kuwait)

28 March 2023	Germany	2–3	Belgium	Cologne, Germany
	Füllkrug 44' (pen.); Gnabry 87'	Report	Carrasco 6'; Lukaku 9'; De Bruyne 78'	Stadium: RheinEnergieStadion; Referee: Willy Delajod (France)

===== UEFA Nations League =====
====== Group 4 ======
Pos	Team	Pld	W	D	L	GF	GA	GD	Pts	Qualification or relegation	(Netherlands)	(Belgium)	(Poland)	(Wales)
1	Netherlands	6	5	1	0	14	6	+8	16	Qualification for Nations League Finals	—	1–0	2–2	3–2
2	Belgium	6	3	1	2	11	8	+3	10		1–4	—	6–1	2–1
3	Poland	6	2	1	3	6	12	−6	7		0–2	0–1	—	2–1
4	Wales (R)	6	0	1	5	6	11	−5	1	Relegation to League B	1–2	1–1	0–1	—

Source: UEFA
(R) Relegated

22 September 2022	Belgium	2–1	Wales	Brussels
20:45	De Bruyne 10'; Batshuayi 37'	Report	Moore 50'	Stadium: King Baudouin Stadium; Attendance: 28,463; Referee: Ali Palabıyık (Turkey)

25 September 2022	Netherlands	1–0	Belgium	Amsterdam
20:45	Van Dijk 73'	Report		Stadium: Johan Cruyff Arena; Attendance: 52,314; Referee: Anthony Taylor (England)

===== FIFA World Cup =====
====== Group F ======
Pos	Team	Pld	W	D	L	GF	GA	GD	Pts	Qualification
1	Morocco	3	2	1	0	4	1	+3	7	Advance to knockout stage
2	Croatia	3	1	2	0	4	1	+3	5	Advance to knockout stage
3	Belgium	3	1	1	1	1	2	−1	4	
4	Canada	3	0	0	3	2	7	−5	0	

Source: FIFA

23 November 2022	Belgium	1–0	Canada	Al Rayyan, Qatar
22:00 AST (UTC+3)	Batshuayi 44'	Report		Stadium: Ahmad bin Ali Stadium; Attendance: 40,432; Referee: Janny Sikazwe (Zambia)

27 November 2022	Belgium	0–2	Morocco	Doha, Qatar
16:00 AST (UTC+3)		Report	Sabiri 73'; Aboukhlal 90+2'	Stadium: Al Thumama Stadium; Attendance: 43,738; Referee: César Arturo Ramos (Mexico)

1 December 2022	Croatia	0–0	Belgium	Al Rayyan, Qatar
18:00 AST (UTC+3)		Report		Stadium: Ahmad bin Ali Stadium; Attendance: 43,984; Referee: Anthony Taylor (England)

===== UEFA Euro 2024 qualifying =====
====== Group F ======
Pos	Team	Pld	W	D	L	GF	GA	GD	Pts	Qualification	(Belgium)	(Austria)	(Sweden)	(Azerbaijan)	(Estonia)
1	Belgium	8	6	2	0	22	4	+18	20	Qualify for final tournament	—	1–1	1–1 (Note: The Belgium v Sweden match was abandoned at 1–1 at half-time for security reasons, as two Swedish supporters had been killed in a terrorist shooting in Brussels prior to the match; the score was later confirmed as final.)	5–0	5–0
2	Austria	8	6	1	1	17	7	+10	19	Qualify for final tournament	2–3	—	2–0	4–1	2–1
3	Sweden	8	3	1	4	14	12	+2	10		0–3	1–3	—	5–0	2–0
4	Azerbaijan	8	2	1	5	7	17	−10	7		0–1	0–1	3–0	—	1–1
5	Estonia	8	0	1	7	2	22	−20	1	Advance to play-offs via Nations League	0–3	0–2	0–5	0–2	—

Source: UEFA
Rules for classification: Qualification tiebreakers
Notes:

24 March 2023	Sweden	0–3	Belgium	Solna
20:45		Report	Lukaku 35', 49', 83'	Stadium: Friends Arena; Attendance: 49,296; Referee: Orel Grinfeld (Israel)

17 June 2023	Belgium	1–1	Austria	Brussels
20:45	Lukaku 61'	Report	Mangala 21' (o.g.)	Stadium: King Baudouin Stadium; Referee: Jérôme Brisard (France)

20 June 2023	Estonia	v	Belgium	Tallinn
20:45 (21:45 UTC+3)		Report		Stadium: Lilleküla Stadium

=== Belgium women's national football team ===
==== Results and fixtures ====
===== Friendlies =====
12 November 2022	Belgium	7–0	Slovakia

7 April 2023	Austria	3–2	Belgium	Wiener Neustadt, Austria
20:30				Stadium: Stadion Wiener Neustadt

11 April 2023	Belgium	2–2	Slovenia

===== UEFA Women's Euro =====
====== Group D ======
Pos	Team	Pld	W	D	L	GF	GA	GD	Pts	Qualification
1	France	3	2	1	0	8	3	+5	7	Advance to knockout stage
2	Belgium	3	1	1	1	3	3	0	4	Advance to knockout stage
3	Iceland	3	0	3	0	3	3	0	3	
4	Italy	3	0	1	2	2	7	−5	1	

Source: UEFA
Rules for classification: Group stage tiebreakers

10 July 2022	Belgium	1–1	Iceland	Manchester, England
17:00	Vanhaevermaet 67' (pen.)	Report	Þorvaldsdóttir 50'	Stadium: Academy Stadium; Attendance: 3,859; Referee: Tess Olofsson (Sweden)

14 July 2022	France	2–1	Belgium	Rotherham, England
20:00	Diani 6'; Mbock Bathy 41'	Report	Cayman 36'	Stadium: New York Stadium; Attendance: 8,173; Referee: Cheryl Foster (Wales)

18 July 2022	Italy	0–1	Belgium	Manchester, England
20:00		Report	De Caigny 49'	Stadium: Academy Stadium; Attendance: 3,919; Referee: Ivana Martinčić (Croatia)

====== Knockout stage ======
22 July 2022 QF	Sweden	1–0	Belgium	Leigh, England
20:00	Sembrant 90+2'	Report		Stadium: Leigh Sports Village; Attendance: 7,517; Referee: Kateryna Monzul (Ukraine)

===== 2023 FIFA Women's World Cup qualification =====
====== Group F ======
Pos	Team	Pld	W	D	L	GF	GA	GD	Pts	Qualification	(Norway)	(Belgium)	(Poland)	(Albania)	(Kosovo)	(Armenia)
1	Norway	10	9	1	0	47	2	+45	28	2023 FIFA Women's World Cup	—	4–0	2–1	5–0	5–1	10–0
2	Belgium	10	7	1	2	56	7	+49	22	Play-offs	0–1	—	4–0	7–0	7–0	19–0
3	Poland	10	6	2	2	28	9	+19	20		0–0	1–1	—	2–0	7–0	12–0
4	Albania	10	3	1	6	14	30	−16	10		0–7	0–5	1–2	—	1–1	5–0
5	Kosovo	10	2	1	7	8	35	−27	7		0–3	1–6	1–2	1–3	—	2–1
6	Armenia	10	0	0	10	1	71	−70	0		0–10	0–7	0–1	0–4	0–1	—

Source: UEFA
Rules for classification: Tiebreakers

2 September 2022	Belgium	0–1	Norway	Leuven, Belgium
20:30		Report	T. Hansen 61'	Stadium: Den Dreef; Referee: Esther Staubli (Switzerland)

6 September 2022	Armenia	0–7	Belgium	Yerevan, Armenia
18:30 (20:30 AMT)		Report	Eurlings 10'; Van Kerkhoven 24', 51', 55'; Vanhaevermaet 31'; Wullaert 41'; Kees 80'	Stadium: Yerevan Football Academy Stadium; Referee: Tanja Subotič (Slovenia)

====== Play-offs ======
6 October 2022	Portugal	2–1	Belgium	Vizela, Portugal
19:00 (18:00 WEST)	Di. Silva 29'; C. Costa 89'	Report	Wullaert 40' (pen.)	Stadium: Estádio do FC Vizela; Attendance: 2,645; Referee: Kateryna Monzul (Ukraine)

===== 2023 Arnold Clark Cup =====
Pos	Team	Pld	W	D	L	GF	GA	GD	Pts
1	England (H, C)	3	3	0	0	12	2	+10	9
2	Belgium	3	2	0	1	5	8	−3	6
3	Italy	3	1	0	2	4	5	−1	3
4	South Korea	3	0	0	3	2	8	−6	0

Source: BBC
Rules for classification: 1) points; 2) goal difference; 3) goals scored; 4) head-to-head result; 5) fair play ranking.
(C) Champions; (H) Hosts

16 February 2023	Italy	1–2	Belgium	Milton Keynes, England
16:45	Giugliano 64'	Report	Detruyer 16'; Wullaert 90'	Stadium: Stadium MK; Attendance: 8,705; Referee: Ewa Augustyn (Poland)

19 February 2023	Belgium	2–1	South Korea	Coventry, England
18:15	Wullaert 45+1'; De Caigny 68'	Report	Lee Geum-min 10'	Stadium: Coventry Building Society Arena; Attendance: 5,609; Referee: Frida Nielsen (Denmark)

22 February 2023	England	6–1	Belgium	Bristol, England
19:45	Kelly 12', 50'; Williamson 42', 90+3'; Biesmans 78' (o.g.); Bronze 89'	Report	Dhont 90+1'	Stadium: Ashton Gate; Attendance: 26,129; Referee: Jelena Cvetković (Serbia)

== UEFA competitions ==
=== UEFA Champions League ===
==== Qualifying phase and play-off round ====
===== Third qualifying round =====
Team 1	Agg.	Team 2	1st leg	2nd leg
Union Saint-Gilloise (Belgium)	2–3	(Scotland) Rangers	2–0	0–3

==== Group stage ====
===== Group B =====
Pos	Team	Pld	W	D	L	GF	GA	GD	Pts	Qualification	POR	BRU	LEV	ATM
1	(Portugal) Porto	6	4	0	2	12	7	+5	12	Advance to knockout phase	—	0–4	2–0	2–1
2	(Belgium) Club Brugge	6	3	2	1	7	4	+3	11	Advance to knockout phase	0–4	—	1–0	2–0
3	(Germany) Bayer Leverkusen	6	1	2	3	4	8	−4	5 (Note: Head-to-head points: Bayer Leverkusen 4, Atlético Madrid 1.)	Transfer to Europa League	0–3	0–0	—	2–0
4	(Spain) Atlético Madrid	6	1	2	3	5	9	−4	5		2–1	0–0	2–2	—

Source: UEFA

==== Knockout phase ====
===== Round of 16 =====
Team 1	Agg.	Team 2	1st leg	2nd leg
Club Brugge (Belgium)	1–7	(Portugal) Benfica	0–2	1–5

=== UEFA Europa League ===
==== Qualifying phase and play-off round ====
===== Play-off round =====
Team 1	Agg.	Team 2	1st leg	2nd leg
Gent (Belgium)	0–4	(Cyprus) Omonia	0–2	0–2

==== Group stage ====
===== Group D =====
Pos	Team	Pld	W	D	L	GF	GA	GD	Pts	Qualification	USG	UBE	BRA	MAL
1	(Belgium) Union Saint-Gilloise	6	4	1	1	11	7	+4	13	Advance to round of 16	—	0–1	3–3	3–2
2	(Germany) Union Berlin	6	4	0	2	4	2	+2	12	Advance to knockout round play-offs	0–1	—	1–0	1–0
3	(Portugal) Braga	6	3	1	2	9	7	+2	10	Transfer to Europa Conference League	1–2	1–0	—	2–1
4	(Sweden) Malmö FF	6	0	0	6	3	11	−8	0		0–2	0–1	0–2	—

Source: UEFA

==== Knockout stage ====
===== Round of 16 =====
Team 1	Agg.	Team 2	1st leg	2nd leg
Union Berlin (Germany)	3–6	(Belgium) Union Saint-Gilloise	3–3	0–3

===== Quarter-finals =====
Team 1	Agg.	Team 2	1st leg	2nd leg
Bayer Leverkusen (Germany)	5–2	(Belgium) Union Saint-Gilloise	1–1	4–1

=== UEFA Europa Conference League ===
==== Qualifying phase and play-off round ====
===== Second qualifying round =====
Team 1	Agg.	Team 2	1st leg	2nd leg
Antwerp (Belgium)	2–0	(Kosovo) Drita	0–0	2–0

===== Third qualifying round =====
Team 1	Agg.	Team 2	1st leg	2nd leg
Paide Linnameeskond (Estonia)	0–5	(Belgium) Anderlecht	0–2	0–3
Lillestrøm (Norway)	1–5	(Belgium) Antwerp	1–3	0–2

===== Play-off round =====
Team 1	Agg.	Team 2	1st leg	2nd leg
İstanbul Başakşehir (Turkey)	4–2	(Belgium) Antwerp	1–1	3–1
Young Boys (Switzerland)	1–1 (1–3 p)	(Belgium) Anderlecht	0–1	1–0 (a.e.t.)

==== Group stage ====
===== Group B =====
Pos	Team	Pld	W	D	L	GF	GA	GD	Pts	Qualification	WHU	AND	SIL	FCSB
1	(England) West Ham United	6	6	0	0	13	4	+9	18	Advance to round of 16	—	2–1	1–0	3–1
2	(Belgium) Anderlecht	6	2	2	2	6	5	+1	8	Advance to knockout round play-offs	0–1	—	1–0	2–2
3	(Denmark) Silkeborg	6	2	0	4	12	7	+5	6		2–3	0–2	—	5–0
4	(Romania) FCSB	6	0	2	4	3	18	−15	2		0–3	0–0	0–5	—

Source: UEFA

===== Group F =====
Pos	Team	Pld	W	D	L	GF	GA	GD	Pts	Qualification	DJU	GNT	MOL	SHR
1	(Sweden) Djurgårdens IF	6	5	1	0	12	6	+6	16	Advance to round of 16	—	4–2	3–2	1–0
2	(Belgium) Gent	6	2	2	2	10	6	+4	8	Advance to knockout round play-offs	0–1	—	4–0	3–0
3	(Norway) Molde	6	2	1	3	9	10	−1	7		2–3	0–0	—	3–0
4	(Republic of Ireland) Shamrock Rovers	6	0	2	4	1	10	−9	2		0–0	1–1	0–2	—

Source: UEFA

==== Knockout stage ====
===== Knockout round play-offs =====
Team 1	Agg.	Team 2	1st leg	2nd leg
Qarabağ (Azerbaijan)	1–1 (3–5 p)	(Belgium) Gent	1–0	0–1 (a.e.t.)
Ludogorets Razgrad (Bulgaria)	2–2 (0–3 p)	(Belgium) Anderlecht	1–0	1–2 (a.e.t.)

===== Round of 16 =====
Team 1	Agg.	Team 2	1st leg	2nd leg
Anderlecht (Belgium)	2–1	(Spain) Villarreal	1–1	1–0
Gent (Belgium)	5–2	(Turkey) İstanbul Başakşehir	1–1	4–1

===== Quarter-finals =====
Team 1	Agg.	Team 2	1st leg	2nd leg
Gent (Belgium)	2–5	(England) West Ham United	1–1	1–4
Anderlecht (Belgium)	2–2 (1–4p)	(Netherlands) AZ	2–0	0–2

=== UEFA Youth League ===
==== UEFA Champions League Path ====
===== Group B =====
Pos	Team	Pld	W	D	L	GF	GA	GD	Pts	Qualification	ATM	POR	BRU	LEV
1	(Royal Spanish Football Federation) Atlético Madrid	6	5	0	1	14	4	+10	15	Round of 16	—	1–0	1–2	4–0
2	(Portuguese Football Federation) Porto	6	4	0	2	11	7	+4	12	Play-offs	1–2	—	2–1	3–1
3	(Royal Belgian Football Association) Club Brugge	6	3	0	3	10	9	+1	9		1–3	1–2	—	4–1
4	(German Football Association) Bayer Leverkusen	6	0	0	6	3	18	−15	0		0–3	1–3	0–1	—

Source: UEFA

==== Domestic Champions Path ====
===== First round =====
Team 1	Agg.	Team 2	1st leg	2nd leg
Genk (Belgium)	5–4	(Czech Republic) Slavia Prague	1–2	4–2

===== Second round =====
Team 1	Agg.	Team 2	1st leg	2nd leg
Coleraine (Northern Ireland)	1–10	(Belgium) Genk	0–4	1–6

==== Knockout phase ====
===== Play-offs =====
Team 1	Score	Team 2
Genk (Belgium)	0–0 (4–3 p)	(Italy) Juventus

===== Round of 16 =====
Team 1	Score	Team 2
Atlético Madrid (Spain)	4–1	(Belgium) Genk

=== UEFA Women's Champions League ===
==== Qualifying rounds ====
===== Round 1 =====
====== Semi-finals ======
Team 1	Score	Team 2
Anderlecht (Belgium)	3–2	(Poland) UKS SMS Łódź

====== Final ======
Team 1	Score	Team 2
Anderlecht (Belgium)	2–2 (3–4 p)	(Finland) KuPS

== Men's football ==
=== Pro League ===
==== Regular season ====
Pos	Team	Pld	W	D	L	GF	GA	GD	Pts	Qualification or relegation
1	Genk (J)	34	23	6	5	78	37	+41	75	Qualification for the Europa Conference League and Play-offs I (Note: The regular season winners will qualify for the 2023–24 UEFA Europa Conference League if they do not qualify for the 2023–24 UEFA Champions League in the playoffs.)
2	Union SG	34	23	6	5	70	41	+29	75	Qualification for the Play-offs I
3	Antwerp (C)	34	22	6	6	59	26	+33	72	Qualification for the Play-offs I
4	Club Brugge	34	16	11	7	61	36	+25	59	Qualification for the Play-offs I
5	Gent (U)	34	16	8	10	64	38	+26	56	Qualification for the Play-offs II
6	Standard Liège	34	16	7	11	58	45	+13	55	Qualification for the Play-offs II
7	Westerlo	34	14	9	11	61	53	+8	51	Qualification for the Play-offs II
8	Cercle Brugge	34	13	11	10	50	46	+4	50	Qualification for the Play-offs II
9	Charleroi	34	14	6	14	45	52	−7	48	
10	OH Leuven	34	13	9	12	56	48	+8	48	
11	Anderlecht	34	13	7	14	49	46	+3	46	
12	Sint-Truiden	34	11	9	14	37	40	−3	42	
13	Mechelen	34	11	7	16	49	63	−14	40	
14	Kortrijk	34	8	7	19	37	61	−24	31	
15	Eupen	34	7	7	20	40	75	−35	28	
16	Oostende (R)	34	7	6	21	37	76	−39	27	Relegation to Challenger Pro League
17	Zulte Waregem (R)	34	6	9	19	50	78	−28	27	Relegation to Challenger Pro League
18	Seraing (R)	34	5	5	24	28	68	−40	20	Relegation to Challenger Pro League

Source: Jupiler Pro League (in Dutch), Soccerway
Rules for classification: 1) Points; 2) Matches won; 3) Goal difference; 4) Goals scored; 5) Away matches won; 6) Away goal difference; 7) Away goals scored; 8) Play-off.
(C) Play-off I winner; (J) Regular season winner; (R) Relegated; (U) Play-off II winner

===== Championship play-offs =====
Pos	Team	Pld	W	D	L	GF	GA	GD	Pts	Qualification or relegation	ANT	GNK	USG	CLU
1	Antwerp (C)	6	3	2	1	10	8	+2	47	Qualification for the Champions League play-off round	—	2–1	1–1	3–2
2	Genk (K)	6	2	2	2	10	10	0	46 (Note: Tied on Points and Points without half points added due to rounding. Regular Season finishing position: Genk 1, Union SG 2.)	Qualification for the Champions League second qualifying round	2–2	—	1–1	3–1
3	Union SG	6	2	2	2	8	8	0	46	Qualification for the Europa League play-off round	0–2	3–0	—	1–3
4	Club Brugge	6	2	0	4	10	12	−2	36	Qualification for the Europa Conference League second qualifying round	2–0	1–3	1–2	—

Source: Jupiler Pro League (in Dutch), Soccerway
Legend: Blue = home team win; Yellow = draw; Red = away team win.
Rules for classification: 1) Points; 2) Points without (possible) half points added due to rounding; 3) Regular season finishing position.
(C) Champions; (K) Regular season winner

===== Europe play-offs =====
Pos	Team	Pld	W	D	L	GF	GA	GD	Pts	Qualification or relegation	GNT	CER	STA	WES
1	Gent (F)	6	5	1	0	17	6	+11	44	Qualification for the Europa Conference League second qualifying round	—	2–2	3–1	3–1
2	Cercle Brugge	6	3	2	1	13	9	+4	36		0–4	—	0–0	2–0
3	Standard Liège	6	0	2	4	4	14	−10	30 (Note: Tied on Points and Points without half points added due to rounding. Regular Season finishing position: Standard Liège 6, Westerlo 7)		1–2	0–4	—	2–2
4	Westerlo	6	1	1	4	10	15	−5	30		1–3	3–5	3–0	—

Source: Jupiler Pro League (in Dutch), Soccerway
Legend: Blue = home team win; Yellow = draw; Red = away team win.
Rules for classification: 1) Points; 2) Points without (possible) half points added due to rounding; 3) Regular season finishing position.
(F) Play-off II winner

=== Challenger Pro League ===
==== Regular season ====
Pos	Team	Pld	W	D	L	GF	GA	GD	Pts	Qualification
1	RWD Molenbeek	22	14	4	4	41	21	+20	46	Qualification for Promotion play-offs
2	Beveren	22	12	7	3	51	24	+27	43	Qualification for Promotion play-offs
3	Beerschot	22	12	2	8	33	28	+5	38	Qualification for Promotion play-offs
4	Lierse Kempenzonen	22	11	3	8	42	42	0	36	Qualification for Promotion play-offs
5	Club NXT (Note: ineligible for promotion.)	22	10	6	6	38	30	+8	36	Qualification for Promotion play-offs
6	RSCA Futures	22	9	7	6	41	34	+7	34	Qualification for Promotion play-offs
7	Lommel	22	10	2	10	33	36	−3	32	Qualification for Relegation play-offs
8	Deinze	22	9	3	10	29	33	−4	30	Qualification for Relegation play-offs
9	Jong Genk	22	5	5	12	27	39	−12	20	Qualification for Relegation play-offs
10	Dender EH	22	5	4	13	27	40	−13	19	Qualification for Relegation play-offs
11	SL16 FC	22	4	7	11	25	43	−18	19	Qualification for Relegation play-offs
12	Virton	22	2	8	12	21	38	−17	14	Qualification for Relegation play-offs

Source: Challengr Pro League
Rules for classification: 1) Points; 2) Matches won; 3) Goal difference; 4) Goals scored; 5) Away goals scored; 6) Away matches won; 7) Play-off.

===== Promotion play-off =====
Pos	Team	Pld	W	D	L	GF	GA	GD	Pts	Promotion	RWD	BEV	NXT	BEE	LIE	AND
1	RWD Molenbeek (C, P)	10	7	2	1	24	8	+16	69	Promoted to Pro League	—	1–1	3–2	4–0	3–1	1–0
2	Beveren	10	8	1	1	24	9	+15	68		2–1	—	4–1	3–0	2–0	4–1
3	Club NXT (Note: Ineligible for promotion)	10	4	1	5	13	18	−5	49		1–3	3–0	—	2–1	0–1	0–0
4	Beerschot	10	3	2	5	10	13	−3	49		1–1	0–1	4–0	—	1–2	0–0
5	Lierse Kempenzonen	10	3	1	6	11	17	−6	46		0–3	2–3	1–2	0–1	—	2–0
6	RSCA Futures	10	0	3	7	4	21	−17	37		0–4	0–4	1–2	0–2	2–2	—

Source: Challenger Pro League
Legend: Blue = home team win; Yellow = draw; Red = away team win.
Rules for classification: 1) Points; 2) Matches won; 3) Goal difference; 4) Goals scored; 5) Away goals scored; 6) Away matches won; 7) Play-off.
(C) Champions; (P) Promoted

===== Relegation play-off =====
Pos	Team	Pld	W	D	L	GF	GA	GD	Pts	Relegation	LOM	DEI	DEN	STA	GNK	VIR
1	Lommel	10	6	1	3	20	10	+10	51		—	4–1	1–0	6–1	2–0	1–2
2	Deinze	10	6	1	3	20	14	+6	49		1–1	—	3–2	5–0	1–3	3–1
3	Dender EH	10	6	2	2	14	7	+7	39		2–1	1–0	—	0–0	1–0	2–1
4	SL16 FC	10	1	5	4	6	17	−11	27		1–0	1–2	1–1	—	0–0	1–1
5	Jong Genk	10	1	3	6	8	18	−10	26		2–3	0–2	0–4	1–1	—	1–1
6	Virton (R)	10	3	2	5	11	13	−2	25	Relegated to National Division 1	0–1	1–2	0–1	1–0	3–1	—

Source: Belgian First Division B
Legend: Blue = home team win; Yellow = draw; Red = away team win.
Rules for classification: 1) Points; 2) Matches won; 3) Goal difference; 4) Goals scored; 5) Away goals scored; 6) Away matches won; 7) Play-off.
(R) Relegated

=== Amateur Leagues ===
==== Belgian National Division 1 ====
Pos	Team	Pld	W	D	L	GF	GA	GD	Pts	Qualification or relegation
1	Patro Eisden (C, P)	38	26	8	4	84	23	+61	86	Promoted to the Challenger Pro League
2	RFC Liège (P)	38	25	11	2	99	29	+70	86	Promoted to the Challenger Pro League
3	Francs Borains (P)	38	23	8	7	79	46	+33	77	Promoted to the Challenger Pro League
4	RAAL La Louvière	38	22	7	9	72	39	+33	73	
5	Jong KAA Gent	38	19	10	9	59	43	+16	67	
6	Heist	38	16	13	9	69	59	+10	61	
7	Olympic Charleroi CF	38	18	6	14	71	52	+19	60	
8	Knokke	38	18	6	14	65	58	+7	60	
9	Visé	38	15	11	12	66	52	+14	56	
10	Thes	38	13	14	11	58	52	+6	53	
11	OH Leuven U-23	38	15	6	17	61	68	−7	50 (Note: OH Leuven U23 was deducted 1 point for not fielding a sufficient number of home-grown players in their home match against Olympic Charleroi.)	
12	Tienen	38	12	10	16	50	60	−10	46	
13	Zébra Élites Charleroi	38	12	8	18	41	58	−17	44	
14	Dessel	38	11	10	17	45	65	−20	43	
15	Sint-Eloois-Winkel	38	11	9	18	44	58	−14	42	
16	Hoogstraten	38	11	8	19	46	60	−14	41	
17	Young Reds Antwerp (O)	38	11	6	21	33	58	−25	39	Qualification for the Division 2 Promotion play-offs Final
18	Ninove (Note: On 1 March 2023, the club released a statement that it was not applying for a football license and purposely decided to be relegated to the 2023–24 Belgian Division 2. Irrespective of its finishing position, Ninove will now always take up one of the direct relegation spots.) (R)	38	10	5	23	39	75	−36	35	Relegation to Division 2
19	Rupel Boom (R)	38	6	6	26	29	83	−54	24	Relegation to Division 2
20	Mandel United (R)	38	4	2	32	16	88	−72	14	Relegation to Division 2

Source: RFBA
Rules for classification: 1) Points; 2) Matches won; 3) Goal difference; 4) Goals scored; 5) Away goals scored; 6) Away matches won.
(C) Champions; (O) Play-off winners; (P) Promoted; (R) Relegated

==== Belgian Division 2 ====
===== Division VV A =====
Pos	Team	Pld	W	D	L	GF	GA	GD	Pts	Qualification or relegation
1	Lokeren-Temse (C, P)	34	22	7	5	66	35	+31	73	Promotion to the 2023–24 Belgian National Division 1
2	Petegem	34	17	8	9	68	55	+13	59	Qualification for the Promotion play-offs VV
3	Oostkamp	34	16	10	8	77	51	+26	58	Qualification for the Promotion play-offs VV
4	Jong Cercle	34	16	7	11	54	43	+11	55	Qualification for the Promotion play-offs VV
5	Racing Gent	34	15	8	11	63	51	+12	53	
6	Merelbeke	34	14	11	9	47	36	+11	53	
7	Aalst	34	15	6	13	55	44	+11	51	Qualification for the Promotion play-offs VV
8	Jong Essevee	34	14	8	12	64	49	+15	50	
9	Dikkelvenne	34	14	8	12	53	55	−2	50	
10	Oudenaarde	34	13	10	11	60	64	−4	49	
11	Zelzate	34	13	6	15	53	55	−2	45	
12	Torhout	34	12	8	14	57	46	+11	44	
13	Olsa Brakel	34	12	8	14	49	54	−5	44	
14	Harelbeke	34	11	8	15	46	60	−14	41	
15	Gullegem	34	10	11	13	57	53	+4	41	
16	Wetteren (O)	34	9	8	17	41	67	−26	35	Qualification for the Relegation play-offs
17	Westhoek (R)	34	8	11	15	44	66	−22	35	Relegation to the 2023–24 Belgian Division 3
18	Erpe-Mere (R)	34	2	3	29	23	93	−70	9	Relegation to the 2023–24 Belgian Division 3

Source: vbal4
Rules for classification: 1) Points; 2) Matches won; 3) Goal difference; 4) Goals scored; 5) Away matches won; 6) Goal difference in away matches; 7) Away goals scored.
(C) Champions; (O) Play-off winners; (P) Promoted; (R) Relegated

===== Division VV B =====
Pos	Team	Pld	W	D	L	GF	GA	GD	Pts	Qualification or relegation
1	Cappellen (C, P)	34	20	6	8	61	37	+24	66	Promotion to the 2023–24 Belgian National Division 1
2	Hades	34	18	8	8	51	32	+19	62	Qualification for the Promotion play-offs VV
3	Hasselt	34	17	7	10	52	42	+10	58	Qualification for the Promotion play-offs VV
4	Belisia	34	17	5	12	55	37	+18	56	Qualification for the Promotion play-offs VV
5	Tongeren	34	17	5	12	61	56	+5	56	
6	Lyra-Lierse Berlaar	34	16	7	11	64	45	+19	55	
7	Jong KV Mechelen	34	15	9	10	60	48	+12	54	
8	Diegem	34	14	10	10	56	51	+5	52	
9	Bocholt	34	14	7	13	54	46	+8	49	
10	Racing Mechelen	34	12	11	11	45	36	+9	47	
11	Lille	34	13	7	14	55	59	−4	46	
12	City Pirates	34	12	8	14	56	75	−19	44	Qualification for the Promotion play-offs VV
13	Londerzeel	34	10	11	13	51	48	+3	41	
14	Berchem	34	10	8	16	45	61	−16	38	
15	Lebbeke	34	10	8	16	47	64	−17	38	
16	Turnhout (R)	34	10	4	20	68	81	−13	34	Qualification for the Relegation play-offs
17	Pepingen-Halle (R)	34	7	7	20	36	66	−30	28	Relegation to the 2023–24 Belgian Division 3
18	Beerschot U23 (R)	34	7	6	21	40	73	−33	27	Relegation to the 2023–24 Belgian Division 3

Source: vbal4
Rules for classification: 1) Points; 2) Matches won; 3) Goal difference; 4) Goals scored; 5) Away matches won; 6) Goal difference in away matches; 7) Away goals scored.
(C) Champions; (P) Promoted; (R) Relegated

===== Division ACFF =====
Pos	Team	Pld	W	D	L	GF	GA	GD	Pts	Qualification or relegation
1	Warnant (Note: Warnant did not apply for a license to be eligible for the Belgian National Division 1 and hence was not eligible for promotion.) (C)	34	22	6	6	58	31	+27	72	
2	Union Namur (P)	34	19	5	10	75	53	+22	62	Promotion to the 2023–24 Belgian National Division 1
3	Tubize-Braine	34	18	7	9	70	33	+37	61	Qualification for the Promotion play-offs ACFF
4	La Louvière Centre	34	18	5	11	62	46	+16	56 (Note: La Louvière Centre was deducted 3 points for not obtaining a valid license during the previous season.)	Qualification for the Promotion play-offs ACFF
5	Meux	34	16	8	10	51	46	+5	56	Qualification for the Promotion play-offs ACFF
6	Binche	34	15	10	9	54	43	+11	55	Qualification for the Promotion play-offs ACFF
7	Rebecq	34	16	5	13	61	54	+7	53	
8	Stockay	34	15	8	11	45	41	+4	53	
9	Verlaine	34	15	6	13	55	41	+14	51	
10	Dison	34	13	11	10	45	44	+1	50	
11	Hamoir	34	12	9	13	47	64	−17	45	
12	Acren-Lessines	34	14	2	18	54	66	−12	44	
13	Ganshoren	34	11	11	12	47	47	0	44	
14	Union SG B	34	10	8	16	53	53	0	38	
15	Jette	34	9	8	17	45	56	−11	35	
16	Solières (R)	34	8	7	19	54	77	−23	31	Relegation to the 2023–24 Belgian Division 3
17	RFC Seraing U23 (R)	34	6	6	22	39	76	−37	24	Relegation to the 2023–24 Belgian Division 3
18	Waremme (R)	34	3	10	21	30	74	−44	19	Relegation to the 2023–24 Belgian Division 3

Updated to match(es) played on completed. Source: vbal4
Rules for classification: 1) Points; 2) Matches won; 3) Goal difference; 4) Goals scored; 5) Away matches won; 6) Goal difference in away matches; 7) Away goals scored.
(C) Champions; (P) Promoted; (R) Relegated

==== Belgian Division 3 ====
===== Division VV A =====
Pos	Team	Pld	W	D	L	GF	GA	GD	Pts	Qualification or relegation
1	Overijse (C, P)	28	20	3	5	67	30	+37	63	Promotion to the 2023–24 Belgian Division 2
2	Voorde-Appelterre (P)	28	16	5	7	54	39	+15	53	Qualification for the Promotion play-offs VV
3	Hamme	28	15	8	5	51	34	+17	53	Qualification for the Promotion play-offs VV
4	Kalken	28	13	8	7	47	32	+15	47	Qualification for the Promotion play-offs VV
5	Wielsbeke	28	12	5	11	55	49	+6	41	Qualification for the Promotion play-offs VV
6	Lede	28	11	6	11	44	37	+7	39	
7	Roeselare-Daisel	28	9	11	8	39	37	+2	38	
8	Stekene	28	9	9	10	43	40	+3	36	
9	Wolvertem Merchtem	28	10	5	13	34	45	−11	35	
10	Wervik	28	9	8	11	50	52	−2	35	
11	Elene Grotenberge	28	8	10	10	46	48	−2	34	
12	Aalter	28	9	5	14	38	60	−22	32	
13	Drongen (R)	28	7	11	10	27	36	−9	32	Qualification for the Relegation play-offs VV
14	Rumbeke (R)	28	6	4	18	30	57	−27	22	Relegation to the 2023–24 Belgian Provincial Leagues
15	Eppegem (R)	28	4	6	18	19	48	−29	18	Relegation to the 2023–24 Belgian Provincial Leagues
16	Anzegem (Note: Due to financial difficulties Anzegem was forced to hand in a general forfait for the remainder of the league on 22 February 2023, with still 9 matchdays to go. As per the rules of the Belgian FA, Anzegem was removed from the league, the result of all matches played declared void, and the matches still to be played were cancelled. The club will only be able to restart at the very bottom of the league for the coming season.) (R)	0	0	0	0	0	0	0	0	Relegation to the 2023–24 Belgian Provincial Leagues

Source: vbal4
Rules for classification: 1) Points; 2) Matches won; 3) Goal difference; 4) Goals scored; 5) Away matches won; 6) Goal difference in away matches; 7) Away goals scored.
(C) Champions; (P) Promoted; (R) Relegated

===== Division VV B =====
Pos	Team	Pld	W	D	L	GF	GA	GD	Pts	Qualification or relegation
1	Wezel (C, P)	30	20	5	5	75	39	+36	65	Promotion to the 2023–24 Belgian Division 2
2	Termien	30	19	7	4	63	32	+31	64	Qualification for the Promotion play-offs VV
3	Houtvenne (P)	30	18	9	3	80	26	+54	63	Qualification for the Promotion play-offs VV
4	Geel	30	15	12	3	64	37	+27	57	Qualification for the Promotion play-offs VV
5	Wellen	30	16	5	9	58	53	+5	53	Qualification for the Promotion play-offs VV
6	Sint-Lenaarts	30	13	9	8	49	36	+13	48	
7	Betekom	30	10	11	9	53	54	−1	41	
8	Diest	30	11	5	14	37	46	−9	38	
9	Zwarte Leeuw	30	10	6	14	51	60	−9	36	
10	Pelt	30	8	11	11	36	41	−5	35	
11	Schoonbeek-Beverst	30	8	9	13	28	49	−21	33	
12	Nijlen	30	7	9	14	39	60	−21	30	
13	Witgoor (O)	30	7	6	17	42	56	−14	27	Qualification for the Relegation play-offs VV
14	Kampenhout (R)	30	7	6	17	40	67	−27	27	Relegation to the 2023–24 Belgian Provincial Leagues
15	Wijgmaal (R)	30	6	5	19	33	67	−34	23	Relegation to the 2023–24 Belgian Provincial Leagues
16	Beringen (R)	30	5	5	20	37	62	−25	20	Relegation to the 2023–24 Belgian Provincial Leagues

Source: vbal4
Rules for classification: 1) Points; 2) Matches won; 3) Goal difference; 4) Goals scored; 5) Away matches won; 6) Goal difference in away matches; 7) Away goals scored.
(C) Champions; (O) Play-off winners; (P) Promoted; (R) Relegated

===== Division ACFF A =====
Pos	Team	Pld	W	D	L	GF	GA	GD	Pts	Qualification or relegation
1	Mons (C, P)	30	21	4	5	61	19	+42	67	Promotion to the 2023–24 Belgian Division 2
2	Onhaye	30	17	6	7	55	34	+21	57	Qualification for the Promotion play-offs ACFF
3	Symphorinois	30	15	8	7	45	38	+7	53	Qualification for the Promotion play-offs ACFF
4	Tournai (O, P)	30	13	10	7	48	34	+14	49	Qualification for the Promotion play-offs ACFF
5	Crossing Schaerbeek	30	13	9	8	43	33	+10	48	
6	Aische	30	13	8	9	62	44	+18	47	
7	Ostiches-Ath	30	13	7	10	40	37	+3	46	
8	Manageoise	30	12	6	12	39	41	−2	42	Qualification for the Promotion play-offs ACFF
9	Monceau	30	11	9	10	46	44	+2	42	
10	Tamines	30	9	9	12	33	37	−4	36	
11	CS Braine	30	8	9	13	40	44	−4	33	
12	Jodoigne	30	8	8	14	42	52	−10	32	
13	Couvin-Mariembourg	30	8	7	15	37	50	−13	31	Qualification for the Relegation play-offs ACFF
14	Saint-Ghislain (R)	30	7	10	13	42	60	−18	31	Relegation to the 2023–24 Belgian Provincial Leagues
15	Gosselies (R)	30	5	8	17	34	62	−28	23	Relegation to the 2023–24 Belgian Provincial Leagues
16	Léopold (R)	30	6	4	20	23	61	−38	22	Relegation to the 2023–24 Belgian Provincial Leagues

Source: vbal4
Rules for classification: 1) Points; 2) Matches won; 3) Goal difference; 4) Goals scored; 5) Away matches won; 6) Goal difference in away matches; 7) Away goals scored.
(C) Champions; (O) Play-off winners; (P) Promoted; (R) Relegated

===== Division ACFF B =====
Pos	Team	Pld	W	D	L	GF	GA	GD	Pts	Qualification or relegation
1	Rochefort (C, P)	30	22	3	5	63	23	+40	69	Promotion to the 2022–23 Belgian Division 2
2	Raeren-Eynatten	30	16	8	6	60	32	+28	56	Qualification for the Promotion play-offs ACFF
3	Richelle	30	16	7	7	55	33	+22	55	Qualification for the Promotion play-offs ACFF
4	Habay	30	13	13	4	51	32	+19	52	Qualification for the Promotion play-offs ACFF
5	La Calamine (O, P)	30	13	8	9	57	43	+14	47	Qualification for the Promotion play-offs ACFF
6	Mormont	30	13	8	9	56	52	+4	47	
7	Sprimont	30	14	4	12	66	46	+20	46	
8	Huy	30	11	12	7	49	31	+18	45	
9	Aywaille	30	9	15	6	47	40	+7	42	
10	Ciney	30	10	11	9	55	52	+3	41	
11	Marloie	30	10	8	12	40	47	−7	38	
12	Meix-dt-Virton	30	8	6	16	39	52	−13	30	
13	Herstal (O)	30	7	7	16	45	65	−20	28	Qualification for the Relegation play-offs ACFF
14	Libramont (R)	30	4	13	13	42	63	−21	25	Relegation to the 2022–23 Belgian Provincial Leagues
15	Durbuy (R)	30	5	5	20	46	85	−39	20	Relegation to the 2022–23 Belgian Provincial Leagues
16	Givry (R)	30	4	2	24	33	108	−75	14	Relegation to the 2022–23 Belgian Provincial Leagues

Source: vbal4
Rules for classification: 1) Points; 2) Matches won; 3) Goal difference; 4) Goals scored; 5) Away matches won; 6) Goal difference in away matches; 7) Away goals scored.
(C) Champions; (O) Play-off winners; (P) Promoted; (R) Relegated

=== Cup competitions ===
Competition	Winner	Score	Runner-up
2022–23 Belgian Cup	Antwerp	2–0	Mechelen
2022 Belgian Super Cup	Club Brugge	1–0	Gent

== Managerial changes ==
This is a list of changes of managers within Belgian professional league football:

=== First Division A ===
Team	Outgoing manager	Manner of departure	Date of vacancy	Position	Replaced by	Date of appointment
Anderlecht	(Belgium) Vincent Kompany	Mutual consent	End of 2021–22 season	Pre-season	(Belgium) Felice Mazzù	31 May 2022
Antwerp	(Denmark) Brian Priske	Sacked	End of 2021–22 season	Pre-season	(Netherlands) Mark van Bommel	26 May 2022
Club Brugge	(Netherlands) Alfred Schreuder	Signed for (Netherlands) Ajax	End of 2021–22 season	Pre-season	(Belgium) Carl Hoefkens	25 May 2022
Eupen	(Australia) Michael Valkanis	End of contract	End of 2021–22 season	Pre-season	(Germany) Bernd Storck	25 May 2022
Genk	(Germany) Bernd Storck	Mutual consent	End of 2021–22 season	Pre-season	(Belgium) Wouter Vrancken	28 May 2022
Mechelen	(Belgium) Wouter Vrancken	Signed for Genk	End of 2021–22 season	Pre-season	(Netherlands) Danny Buijs	1 June 2022
Seraing	(France) Jean-Louis Garcia	Resigned	End of 2021–22 season	Pre-season	(Belgium) José Jeunechamps	20 May 2022
Standard Liège	(Slovenia) Luka Elsner	Sacked	End of 2021–22 season	Pre-season	(Norway) Ronny Deila	13 June 2022
Union SG	(Belgium) Felice Mazzù	Signed for Anderlecht	End of 2021–22 season	Pre-season	(Belgium) Karel Geraerts	9 June 2022
Zulte Waregem	(Belgium) Davy De fauw & (Belgium) Timmy Simons	Replaced	End of 2021–22 season	Pre-season	(Senegal) Mbaye Leye	17 May 2022
Kortrijk	(France) Karim Belhocine	Sacked	29 August 2022	17th	(Bosnia and Herzegovina) Adnan Čustović	1 September 2022
Cercle Brugge	(Austria) Dominik Thalhammer	Replaced	19 September 2022	17th	(Austria) Miron Muslic	19 September 2022
Mechelen	(Netherlands) Danny Buijs	Sacked	17 October 2022	13th	(Belgium) Steven Defour	17 October 2022
Charleroi	(Belgium) Edward Still	Sacked	22 October 2022	11th	(Belgium) Frank Defays (caretaker)	28 November 2022 (Note: The announcement of Felice Mazzù returning to Charleroi was already made on 12 November 2022, but Mazzù would only officially take up the role during the 2022 FIFA World Cup-break, on 28 November 2022.)
Eupen	(Germany) Bernd Storck	Sacked	23 October 2022	14th	(Belgium) Kristoffer Andersen and (Belgium) Mario Kohnen (caretakers)	
Anderlecht	(Belgium) Felice Mazzù	Sacked	24 October 2022	12th	(Netherlands) Robin Veldman (caretaker)	24 October 2022
Oostende	(Belgium) Yves Vanderhaeghe	Sacked	31 October 2022	14th	(Austria) Dominik Thalhammer	
Seraing	(Belgium) José Jeunechamps	Sacked	31 October 2022	17th	(Belgium) Jean-Sébastien Legros (caretaker)	
Kortrijk	(Bosnia and Herzegovina) Adnan Čustović	Sacked	14 November 2022	17th	(Germany) Bernd Storck	18 November 2022
Eupen	(Belgium) Kristoffer Andersen and (Belgium) Mario Kohnen	End of caretaker spell	24 November 2022	15th	(Belgium) Edward Still	24 November 2022
Charleroi	(Belgium) Frank Defays	End of caretaker spell	28 November 2022	12th	(Belgium) Felice Mazzù	28 November 2022
Anderlecht	(Netherlands) Robin Veldman	End of caretaker spell	2 December 2022	11th	(Denmark) Brian Riemer	2 December 2022
Club Brugge	(Belgium) Carl Hoefkens	Sacked	28 December 2022	4th	(England) Scott Parker	31 December 2022
Club Brugge	(England) Scott Parker	Sacked	8 March 2023	4th	(Belgium) Rik De Mil (caretaker) (Note: On 25 May 2023, Ronny Deila signed for Club Brugge as new manager. While he left Standard Liège immediately, caretaker Rik De Mil remained in charge at Club Brugge for the remainder of the season.)	8 March 2023
Zulte Waregem	(Senegal) Mbaye Leye	Sacked	15 March 2023	17th	(Belgium) Frederik D’Hollander & (Belgium) Davy De fauw	15 March 2023
Standard Liège	(Norway) Ronny Deila	Signed for Club Brugge	25 May 2023	7th	(Belgium) Geoffrey Valenne (caretaker)	25 May 2023

=== First Division B ===
Team	Outgoing manager	Manner of departure	Date of vacancy	Position	Replaced by	Date of appointment
Deinze	(Belgium) Wim De Decker	Mutual consent	End of 2021–22 season	Pre-season	(Japan) Takahisa Shiraishi	19 May 2022
Beerschot	(Belgium) Greg Vanderidt	Replaced	End of 2021–22 season	Pre-season	(Austria) Andreas Wieland	23 May 2022
Lommel	(England) Brian Eastick	End of contract	End of 2021–22 season	Pre-season	(England) Steve Bould	3 June 2022
Beveren	(Spain) Jordi Condom	End of contract	End of 2021–22 season	Pre-season	(Belgium) Wim De Decker	5 June 2022
Club NXT	(Belgium) Rik De Mil	Promoted to Club Brugge as assistant	End of 2021–22 season	Pre-season	(Belgium) Nicky Hayen	15 June 2022
Virton	(Uruguay) Pablo Correa	End of contract	End of 2021–22 season	Pre-season	(France) Christian Bracconi	9 July 2022
SL16 FC	(Belgium) Geoffrey Valenne	Replaced	End of 2021–22 season	Pre-season	(Germany) Joseph Laumann	11 July 2022
Deinze	(Japan) Takahisa Shiraishi	Resigned	29 September 2022	12th	(Spain) Antonio Calderón (caretaker)	30 September 2022
Deinze	(Spain) Antonio Calderón (caretaker)	Caretaker replaced	24 October 2022	12th	(Belgium) Marc Grosjean	24 October 2022
RSCA Futures	(Netherlands) Robin Veldman	Promoted to Anderlecht as caretaker	24 October 2022	5th	(Belgium) Guillaume Gillet	24 October 2022
Dender EH	(Belgium) Regi Van Acker	Sacked	7 February 2023	9th	(Belgium) Pieter De Bot (caretaker)	7 February 2023
Virton	(France) Christian Bracconi	Sacked	7 February 2023	12th	(Belgium) José Jeunechamps	7 February 2023
Dender EH	(Belgium) Pieter De Bot	Caretaker replaced	13 February 2023	10th	(Belgium) Timmy Simons	13 February 2023
Club NXT	(Belgium) Nicky Hayen	Promoted to Club Brugge as assistant	15 March 2023	4th	(Belgium) Hayk Milkon	15 March 2023

== See also ==
- 2022–23 Belgian Pro League
- 2022–23 Challenger Pro League
- 2022–23 Belgian National Division 1
- 2022–23 Belgian Division 2
- 2022–23 Belgian Division 3
- 2022–23 Belgian Cup
- 2022 Belgian Super Cup
