= 2022–23 Belgian Pro League =

120th season of top-tier football in Belgium

Belgian Pro League
- Season: 2022–23
- Dates: 22 July 2022 – 4 June 2023
- Champions: Royal Antwerp
- Relegated: Oostende; Zulte Waregem; Seraing
- Champions League: Royal Antwerp; Genk
- Europa League: Union SG
- Europa Conference League: Club Brugge; Gent
- Matches: 330
- Goals: 1,011 (3.06 per match)
- Top goalscorer: Hugo Cuypers (27 goals)
- Biggest home win: Club Brugge 7–0 Eupen (23 April 2023)
- Biggest away win: Oostende 1–6 Union SG (16 October 2022)
- Highest scoring: Zulte Waregem 5–5 Eupen (12 November 2022)
- Longest winning run: 10 (Genk)
- Longest unbeaten run: 17 (Union SG)
- Longest winless run: 11 (Oostende)
- Longest losing run: 7 (Seraing)
- Highest attendance: 26,271 (Standard - Anderlecht)
- Lowest attendance: 0 (Anderlecht - Zulte Waregem, behind closed doors)
- Total attendance: 3,154,698
- Average attendance: 9,560

The 2022–23 Belgian Pro League (officially known as the Jupiler Pro League due to sponsorship reasons) was the 120th season of top-tier football in Belgium. Royal Antwerp were crowned league champions for the first time in 66 years after pipping Genk and Union St-Gilloise on the final day, the first occasion since 1999 that three clubs were still contending the title going in the final match. All three Championship chasers were in the virtual lead in the table at different stages across the final five minutes before Toby Alderweireld's title-clinching goal.

Genk's title-challenge was helped by a record-breaking 24 assists from Mike Trésor while Hugo Cuypers of Gent became the first Belgian winner of the Golden Bull for top scorer since Romelu Lukaku in 2009–10.

Zulte Waregem, pipped for the title on the final day ten years earlier and subsequent Cup winners in 2017, were one of three sides relegated.

== Format change ==
At the end of the 2019–20 Belgian First Division A, it was decided to exceptionally cancel any relegations as a result of the league being stopped early due to the COVID-19 pandemic. This caused the league to temporarily expand to 18 as promotions from a lower league did occur as originally planned. It was decided at that point that the goal was to eventually return to 16 teams, and at the end of the 2021–22 Belgian First Division A, the clubs agreed that the 2022–23 season will reduce the number of clubs at the highest level again to 16, as this season only three teams will face direct relegation instead of just one. Furthermore, a new format was also decided from 2023–24 onwards (with 16 teams), returning to a slightly altered version of the playoff structure used prior to the 2019–20 season, but most importantly also increasing the teams relegating each season from 1 to 2 direct plus an additional optional third team through a playoff. A minor change was the renaming of the top two leagues, with the First Division A and First Division B now renamed Jupiler Pro League and Challenger Pro League respectively.

== Teams ==
Eighteen teams competed in the league – the top seventeen teams from the previous season and 2021–22 Belgian First Division B champions Westerlo who returned after spending five seasons at the second tier following their relegation at the end of the 2016–17 season. They replaced Beerschot who had finished last by a very large margin and were relegated after two seasons at the highest level. No other changes happened as Seraing (who finished 17th) won the Relegation play-off against RWDM, and thus stayed in the top division.

== Relegations ==
With three clubs being relegated, there was a major turnover in coaches with most clubs changing coach during the season. Out of the 18 Pro League sides, only seven kept the same coach from the opening day to the last. Seraing became the first club to be relegated, following a 2–0 away loss to Club Brugge on 7 April 2023. One week later, on 15 April 2023, Oostende also dropped as they went down 0–4 at home to OH Leuven. Yet another week later, on the final matchday of the regular season, Zulte Waregem became the third and final team relegated following a 2–3 home loss to Cercle Brugge.

=== Stadiums and locations ===
Locations of the 2022–23 Belgian Pro League teams

Matricule	Club	Location	Venue	Capacity
35	Anderlecht	Anderlecht, Brussels	Constant Vanden Stock Stadium	21,500
1	Antwerp	Antwerp	Bosuilstadion	16,144
12	Cercle Brugge	Bruges	Jan Breydel Stadium	29,042
22	Charleroi	Charleroi	Stade du Pays de Charleroi	14,000
3	Club Brugge	Bruges	Jan Breydel Stadium	29,042
4276	Eupen	Eupen	Kehrwegstadion	8,363
322	Genk	Genk	Cegeka Arena	24,956
7	Gent	Ghent	Ghelamco Arena	20,000
19	Kortrijk	Kortrijk	Guldensporen Stadion	9,399
25	Mechelen	Mechelen	AFAS-stadion Achter de Kazerne	16,700
31	Oostende	Ostend	Versluys Arena	8,432
18	OH Leuven	Leuven	Den Dreef	10,000
167	Seraing	Seraing	Stade du Pairay	8,207
373	Sint-Truiden	Sint-Truiden	Stayen	14,600
16	Standard Liège	Liège	Stade Maurice Dufrasne	30,023
10	Union SG	Saint-Gilles, Brussels	Stade Joseph Marien	8,000
2024	Westerlo	Westerlo	Het Kuipje	8,035
5381	Zulte Waregem	Waregem	Regenboogstadion	12,500

=== Number of teams by provinces ===
Number of teams	Province or region	Team(s)
5	West Flanders	Cercle Brugge, Club Brugge, Kortrijk, Oostende and Zulte Waregem
3	Antwerp	Antwerp, Mechelen and Westerlo
3	Liège	Eupen, Seraing and Standard Liège
2	Brussels	Anderlecht and Union SG
2	Limburg	Genk and Sint-Truiden
1	East Flanders	Gent
1	Flemish Brabant	Oud-Heverlee Leuven
1	Hainaut	Charleroi

=== Personnel and kits ===
Club	Manager	Kit Manufacturer	Sponsors
Anderlecht	(Denmark) Brian Riemer (Note: Felice Mazzù was the manager for matchdays 1 through 11, Robin Veldman took up the role of caretaker manager on matchdays 11 through 17.)	Joma	DVV Insurance (home) & Candriam (away)
Antwerp	(Netherlands) Mark van Bommel	Jako	betFIRST
Cercle Brugge	(Austria) Miron Muslic (Note: Dominik Thalhammer was the manager for matchdays 1 through 9.)	Kappa	Napoleon Games
Charleroi	(Belgium) Felice Mazzù (Note: Edward Still was the manager for matchdays 1 through 14, Frank Defays took up the role of caretaker manager on matchdays 15 through 17.)	Kappa	Unibet
Club Brugge	(Belgium) Rik De Mil (caretaker) (Note: Carl Hoefkens was the manager for matchdays 1 through 18, Scott Parker was in charge from matchday 19 through 28.)	Macron	Unibet
Eupen	(Belgium) Edward Still (Note: Bernd Storck was the manager for matchdays 1 through 14, Kristoffer Andersen and Mario Kohnen took up the role of caretaker manager on matchdays 15 through 17.)	Adidas	Aspire Academy
Genk	(Belgium) Wouter Vrancken	Nike	Beobank
Gent	(Belgium) Hein Vanhaezebrouck	Craft	VDK Bank
Kortrijk	(Germany) Bernd Storck (Note: Karim Belhocine was the manager for matchdays 1 through 6, Adnan Čustović for matchdays 7 through 17.)	Jako	AGO Jobs & HR
Mechelen	(Belgium) Steven Defour (Note: Danny Buijs was the manager for matchdays 1 through 12.)	Erreà	Telenet
OH Leuven	(Belgium) Marc Brys	Stanno	Star Casino
Oostende	(Austria) Dominik Thalhammer (Note: Yves Vanderhaeghe was the manager for matchdays 1 through 15.)	Kipsta	Bwin Casino Ostend
Seraing	(Belgium) Jean-Sébastien Legros (Note: José Jeunechamps was the manager for matchdays 1 through 15.)	Kappa	Star Casino
Sint-Truiden	(Germany) Bernd Hollerbach	Macron	Nishitan Clinic
Standard Liège	(Belgium) Geoffrey Valenne (caretaker) (Note: Ronny Deila was the manager during the regular season and for matchdays 1 through 4 of Play-off II.)	Adidas	VOO
Union SG	(Belgium) Karel Geraerts	Union Soixante	Loterie Nationale
Westerlo	(Belgium) Jonas De Roeck	Nike	Soudal
Zulte-Waregem	(Belgium) Frederik D’Hollander & (Belgium) Davy De fauw (Note: Mbaye Leye was the manager for matchdays 1 through 29.)	Patrick	Napoleon Games

=== Managerial changes ===
Team	Outgoing manager	Manner of departure	Date of vacancy	Position	Replaced by	Date of appointment
Anderlecht	(Belgium) Vincent Kompany	Mutual consent	End of 2021–22 season	Pre-season	(Belgium) Felice Mazzù	31 May 2022
Antwerp	(Denmark) Brian Priske	Sacked	End of 2021–22 season	Pre-season	(Netherlands) Mark van Bommel	26 May 2022
Club Brugge	(Netherlands) Alfred Schreuder	Signed for (Netherlands) Ajax	End of 2021–22 season	Pre-season	(Belgium) Carl Hoefkens	25 May 2022
Eupen	(Australia) Michael Valkanis	End of contract	End of 2021–22 season	Pre-season	(Germany) Bernd Storck	25 May 2022
Genk	(Germany) Bernd Storck	Mutual consent	End of 2021–22 season	Pre-season	(Belgium) Wouter Vrancken	28 May 2022
Mechelen	(Belgium) Wouter Vrancken	Signed for Genk	End of 2021–22 season	Pre-season	(Netherlands) Danny Buijs	1 June 2022
Seraing	(France) Jean-Louis Garcia	Resigned	End of 2021–22 season	Pre-season	(Belgium) José Jeunechamps	20 May 2022
Standard Liège	(Slovenia) Luka Elsner	Sacked	End of 2021–22 season	Pre-season	(Norway) Ronny Deila	13 June 2022
Union SG	(Belgium) Felice Mazzù	Signed for Anderlecht	End of 2021–22 season	Pre-season	(Belgium) Karel Geraerts	9 June 2022
Zulte Waregem	(Belgium) Davy De fauw & (Belgium) Timmy Simons	Replaced	End of 2021–22 season	Pre-season	(Senegal) Mbaye Leye	17 May 2022
Kortrijk	(France) Karim Belhocine	Sacked	29 August 2022	17th	(Bosnia and Herzegovina) Adnan Čustović	1 September 2022
Cercle Brugge	(Austria) Dominik Thalhammer	Replaced	19 September 2022	17th	(Austria) Miron Muslic	19 September 2022
Mechelen	(Netherlands) Danny Buijs	Sacked	17 October 2022	13th	(Belgium) Steven Defour	17 October 2022
Charleroi	(Belgium) Edward Still	Sacked	22 October 2022	11th	(Belgium) Frank Defays (caretaker)	28 November 2022 (Note: The announcement of Felice Mazzù returning to Charleroi was already made on 12 November 2022, but Mazzù would only officially take up the role during the 2022 FIFA World Cup-break, on 28 November 2022.)
Eupen	(Germany) Bernd Storck	Sacked	23 October 2022	14th	(Belgium) Kristoffer Andersen and (Belgium) Mario Kohnen (caretakers)	
Anderlecht	(Belgium) Felice Mazzù	Sacked	24 October 2022	12th	(Netherlands) Robin Veldman (caretaker)	24 October 2022
Oostende	(Belgium) Yves Vanderhaeghe	Sacked	31 October 2022	14th	(Austria) Dominik Thalhammer	
Seraing	(Belgium) José Jeunechamps	Sacked	31 October 2022	17th	(Belgium) Jean-Sébastien Legros (caretaker)	
Kortrijk	(Bosnia and Herzegovina) Adnan Čustović	Sacked	14 November 2022	17th	(Germany) Bernd Storck	18 November 2022
Eupen	(Belgium) Kristoffer Andersen and (Belgium) Mario Kohnen	End of caretaker spell	24 November 2022	15th	(Belgium) Edward Still	24 November 2022
Charleroi	(Belgium) Frank Defays	End of caretaker spell	28 November 2022	12th	(Belgium) Felice Mazzù	28 November 2022
Anderlecht	(Netherlands) Robin Veldman	End of caretaker spell	2 December 2022	11th	(Denmark) Brian Riemer	2 December 2022
Club Brugge	(Belgium) Carl Hoefkens	Sacked	28 December 2022	4th	(England) Scott Parker	31 December 2022
Club Brugge	(England) Scott Parker	Sacked	8 March 2023	4th	(Belgium) Rik De Mil (caretaker) (Note: On 25 May 2023, Ronny Deila signed for Club Brugge as new manager. While he left Standard Liège immediately, caretaker Rik De Mil remained in charge at Club Brugge for the remainder of the season.)	8 March 2023
Zulte Waregem	(Senegal) Mbaye Leye	Sacked	15 March 2023	17th	(Belgium) Frederik D’Hollander & (Belgium) Davy De fauw	15 March 2023
Standard Liège	(Norway) Ronny Deila	Signed for Club Brugge	25 May 2023	7th	(Belgium) Geoffrey Valenne (caretaker)	25 May 2023

== Regular season ==
=== League table ===
Pos	Team	Pld	W	D	L	GF	GA	GD	Pts	Qualification or relegation
1	Genk (J)	34	23	6	5	78	37	+41	75	Qualification for the Europa Conference League and Play-offs I (Note: The regular season winners will qualify for the 2023–24 UEFA Europa Conference League if they do not qualify for the 2023–24 UEFA Champions League in the playoffs.)
2	Union SG	34	23	6	5	70	41	+29	75	Qualification for the Play-offs I
3	Antwerp (C)	34	22	6	6	59	26	+33	72	Qualification for the Play-offs I
4	Club Brugge	34	16	11	7	61	36	+25	59	Qualification for the Play-offs I
5	Gent (U)	34	16	8	10	64	38	+26	56	Qualification for the Play-offs II
6	Standard Liège	34	16	7	11	58	45	+13	55	Qualification for the Play-offs II
7	Westerlo	34	14	9	11	61	53	+8	51	Qualification for the Play-offs II
8	Cercle Brugge	34	13	11	10	50	46	+4	50	Qualification for the Play-offs II
9	Charleroi	34	14	6	14	45	52	−7	48	
10	OH Leuven	34	13	9	12	56	48	+8	48	
11	Anderlecht	34	13	7	14	49	46	+3	46	
12	Sint-Truiden	34	11	9	14	37	40	−3	42	
13	Mechelen	34	11	7	16	49	63	−14	40	
14	Kortrijk	34	8	7	19	37	61	−24	31	
15	Eupen	34	7	7	20	40	75	−35	28	
16	Oostende (R)	34	7	6	21	37	76	−39	27	Relegation to Challenger Pro League
17	Zulte Waregem (R)	34	6	9	19	50	78	−28	27	Relegation to Challenger Pro League
18	Seraing (R)	34	5	5	24	28	68	−40	20	Relegation to Challenger Pro League

Source: Jupiler Pro League (in Dutch), Soccerway
Rules for classification: 1) Points; 2) Matches won; 3) Goal difference; 4) Goals scored; 5) Away matches won; 6) Away goal difference; 7) Away goals scored; 8) Play-off.
(C) Play-off I winner; (J) Regular season winner; (R) Relegated; (U) Play-off II winner

=== Results ===
Home \ Away	GNK	USG	ANT	CLU	GNT	STA	WES	CER	CHA	OHL	AND	STR	MEC	KVK	EUP	OOS	ZWA	SER
Genk		1–2	0–1	3–1	1–0	3–1	6–1	2–1	4–1	2–1	5–2	0–0	3–1	2–1	4–2	3–0	1–0	2–0
Union SG	1–2		2–0	2–2	2–0	2–4	1–1	2–1	1–0	1–0	2–1	2–1	2–1	2–1	2–1	3–0	4–0	2–1
Antwerp	1–3	4–2		0–0	2–0	4–1	3–0	2–1	0–1	4–2	0–0	2–0	5–0	1–0	2–0	3–0	1–0	2–1
Club Brugge	3–2	1–1	2–2		2–0	2–0	0–2	4–0	2–2	1–1	1–1	3–0	3–0	2–1	7–0	4–2	1–1	2–0
Gent	2–3	1–1	1–2	2–0		0–0	2–1	3–4	0–0	2–0	1–0	1–1	3–0	2–1	3–0	1–2	2–0	2–1
Standard Liège	2–0	2–3	3–0	3–0	2–2		2–0	2–0	3–1	1–3	5–0 FF (Note: Match stopped at 3–1 in the second half due to Anderlecht supporters throwing pyrotechnics on the pitch. Standard was awarded a 5–0 forfeit win, but both clubs were penalized for taking insufficient measures to prevent the event. Anderlecht were fined €10.000, forced to play two home matches without supporters, and given two provisional home matches without supporters. Standard were fined €10.000 and given one provisional home match without supporters.)	1–1	2–0	0–2	3–1	1–0	2–2	0–2
Westerlo	2–3	4–2	3–3	0–0	3–3	4–2		2–0	2–3	1–2	2–1	2–3	2–0	3–1	0–1	6–0	2–0	2–2
Cercle Brugge	1–1	1–1	0–2	2–2	3–2	1–1	0–1		4–1	2–1	1–0	3–1	0–0	2–0	5–1	2–2	1–1	3–1
Charleroi	2–2	0–1	1–0	1–3	2–1	0–1	2–3	2–1		0–1	0–1	1–0	0–5 FF (Note: Match stopped at 1–0 in the second half due to Charleroi supporters throwing pyrotechnics on the pitch. Eleven days after the match, on 23 November 2022, Charleroi was penalized with a fine of €75.000 and three matches behind closed doors, and all media reported that the match would be overturned to a 0–5 forfeit loss to Charleroi. Four months later, on 17 March 2023, the disciplinary commission decided that the match has to be replayed (in full) behind closed doors, as referee Jan Boterberg made procedural errors in filing his report. After an appeal at the Belgian Court For Sports Arbitrage by several impacted clubs, the final ruling was made on 11 April 2023, and Charleroi was given a 0–5 forfeit loss.)	2–2	3–1	1–3	3–2	3–0
OH Leuven	0–1	0–3	1–1	0–3	1–1	3–2	2–0	0–0	3–2		0–2	1–1	4–1	2–3	1–1	2–1	4–2	5–0
Anderlecht	0–2	1–3	0–0	0–1	0–1	2–2	0–0	2–0	0–1	2–2		3–1	2–3	4–1	4–2	2–0	2–3	3–1
Sint-Truiden	2–2	1–1	0–1	1–1	0–3	1–2	0–1	0–1	2–1	0–0	0–3		3–1	1–0	0–1	5–0	2–0	2–1
Mechelen	2–2	3–0	0–2	0–3	1–1	2–0	5–4	1–1	2–2	0–0	1–3	1–0		3–2	2–1	2–1	2–2	2–3
Kortrijk	1–0	2–4	2–1	1–0	0–4	0–1	0–2	1–1	0–1	0–2	2–2	0–0	1–4		0–0	2–2	1–3	3–2
Eupen	1–1 (Note: Match postponed from 20 January 2023 to 1 February 2023 due to snowfall.)	1–2	0–1	2–1	0–4	2–0	1–1	2–2	1–2	4–2	0–1	0–2	2–1	0–1		4–4	1–5	1–3
Oostende	1–2	1–6	0–3	3–0	1–3	1–3	1–2	1–2	0–0	0–4	0–2	0–1	2–1	3–1	1–0		2–1	1–2
Zulte Waregem	1–4	1–3	0–2	1–2	2–6	0–3	1–1	2–3	1–3	2–5	3–2	0–3	2–0	3–3	5–5	1–1		2–0
Seraing	0–4	1–2	0–2	0–2	0–5	1–1	1–1	0–1	0–1	2–1	0–1	1–2	0–2	0–1	0–1	1–1	1–1	

Source: Kalender eerste klasse A 2022-23
Legend: Blue = home team win; Yellow = draw; Red = away team win.

=== Positions by round ===
The table lists the positions of teams after the completion of each round.

Team ╲ Round	1	2	3	4	5	6	7	8	9	10	11	12	13	14	15	16	17	18	19	20	21	22	23	24	25	26	27	28	29	30	31	32	33	34
Genk	12	4	2	2	2	2	2	2	2	2	2	1	1	1	1	1	1	1	1	1	1	1	1	1	1	1	1	1	1	1	1	1	1	1
Union SG	10	3	11	6	9	6	5	7	6	4	4	4	4	4	4	3	2	2	2	2	2	2	2	2	2	2	2	2	2	2	2	2	2	2
Antwerp	2	2	1	1	1	1	1	1	1	1	1	2	2	2	2	2	3	3	3	3	3	3	3	3	3	3	3	3	3	3	3	3	3	3
Club Brugge	7	8	8	5	4	3	3	3	3	3	3	3	3	3	3	4	4	4	4	4	4	5	4	4	4	4	4	4	4	5	5	5	5	4
Gent	8	14	6	4	3	5	7	5	7	9	8	6	6	5	6	5	5	5	5	5	5	4	5	5	5	5	5	5	5	4	4	4	4	5
Standard Liège	9	16	9	12	14	11	9	6	5	6	6	5	5	6	5	6	7	6	6	6	6	6	6	6	6	6	7	6	7	7	6	6	6	6
Westerlo	4	9	14	7	10	12	13	12	11	7	7	8	8	7	7	7	6	7	7	7	8	7	7	7	7	7	6	7	6	6	7	7	7	7
Cercle Brugge	16	13	16	15	16	16	18	18	17	17	17	12	12	9	12	10	9	9	10	10	10	10	8	9	8	8	8	8	8	10	10	10	9	8
Charleroi	1	5	13	8	6	8	6	8	10	8	10	11	10	13	11	12	12	14	12	11	11	13	13	13	12	11	10	9	11	9	9	8	8	9
OH Leuven	2	1	4	9	7	4	4	4	4	5	5	7	7	8	8	9	8	8	9	9	9	9	10	11	11	12	13	11	10	11	11	11	11	10
Anderlecht	4	6	3	3	5	7	8	9	8	10	9	9	9	12	10	11	11	11	11	13	13	12	11	10	10	9	9	10	9	8	8	9	10	11
Sint-Truiden	11	15	17	17	12	9	10	11	9	11	11	10	11	11	9	8	10	10	8	8	7	8	9	8	9	10	11	12	13	12	12	12	12	12
Mechelen	14	17	12	11	8	10	11	10	12	12	12	13	13	10	13	13	13	12	13	12	12	11	12	12	13	13	12	13	12	13	13	13	13	13
Kortrijk	14	12	10	14	13	17	12	14	14	14	15	16	16	17	16	16	17	16	15	15	14	14	14	15	15	14	14	14	15	14	14	14	14	14
Eupen	13	10	15	16	18	14	15	15	15	15	16	17	14	15	15	15	15	13	14	14	15	15	15	14	14	15	15	15	14	15	15	15	15	15
Oostende	16	11	5	10	11	13	14	13	13	13	13	15	17	14	14	14	14	15	16	16	17	17	17	18	17	17	17	16	16	16	16	16	17	16
Zulte Waregem	4	6	7	13	15	15	17	17	18	18	18	18	18	18	18	17	16	17	17	17	16	16	16	16	16	16	16	17	17	17	17	17	16	17
Seraing	16	18	18	18	17	18	16	16	16	16	14	14	15	16	17	18	18	18	18	18	18	18	18	17	18	18	18	18	18	18	18	18	18	18

Source: worldfootball.net

== Play-offs ==
=== Play-off I ===
Points obtained during the regular season were halved (and rounded up in the event of half-points) before the start of the playoff. Genk and Union SG, therefore, started on 38 points, Antwerp on 36, and Club Brugge on 30. Only Antwerp did not see their points rounded up, hence in case of ties they were always ranked above the other teams. Any other ties were broken by regular season finishing order (Genk, then Union SG, then Club Brugge).

Pos	Team	Pld	W	D	L	GF	GA	GD	Pts	Qualification or relegation	ANT	GNK	USG	CLU
1	Antwerp (C)	6	3	2	1	10	8	+2	47	Qualification for the Champions League play-off round	—	2–1	1–1	3–2
2	Genk (K)	6	2	2	2	10	10	0	46 (Note: Tied on Points and Points without half points added due to rounding. Regular Season finishing position: Genk 1, Union SG 2.)	Qualification for the Champions League second qualifying round	2–2	—	1–1	3–1
3	Union SG	6	2	2	2	8	8	0	46	Qualification for the Europa League play-off round	0–2	3–0	—	1–3
4	Club Brugge	6	2	0	4	10	12	−2	36	Qualification for the Europa Conference League second qualifying round	2–0	1–3	1–2	—

Source: Jupiler Pro League (in Dutch), Soccerway
Legend: Blue = home team win; Yellow = draw; Red = away team win.
Rules for classification: 1) Points; 2) Points without (possible) half points added due to rounding; 3) Regular season finishing position.
(C) Champions; (K) Regular season winner

=== Play-off II ===
Points obtained during the regular season will be halved (and rounded up) before the start of the playoff. Gent and Standard started on 28 points, Westerlo on 26, and Cercle Brugge on 25. As the points of Standard and Westerlo were rounded up, in case of ties they would always be ranked below the team (or teams) they are tied with. The deciding factor after that would be finishing position in the regular season.

Pos	Team	Pld	W	D	L	GF	GA	GD	Pts	Qualification or relegation	GNT	CER	STA	WES
1	Gent (F)	6	5	1	0	17	6	+11	44	Qualification for the Europa Conference League second qualifying round	—	2–2	3–1	3–1
2	Cercle Brugge	6	3	2	1	13	9	+4	36		0–4	—	0–0	2–0
3	Standard Liège	6	0	2	4	4	14	−10	30 (Note: Tied on Points and Points without half points added due to rounding. Regular Season finishing position: Standard Liège 6, Westerlo 7)		1–2	0–4	—	2–2
4	Westerlo	6	1	1	4	10	15	−5	30		1–3	3–5	3–0	—

Source: Jupiler Pro League (in Dutch), Soccerway
Legend: Blue = home team win; Yellow = draw; Red = away team win.
Rules for classification: 1) Points; 2) Points without (possible) half points added due to rounding; 3) Regular season finishing position.
(F) Play-off II winner

== Season statistics ==
As of 4 June 2023

Prizes awarded cover all 40 rounds of the season, i.e. the 34 rounds of regular season football plus the six weeks of Champions Play-Offs and Europe Play-Offs.

=== Top goalscorers ===
Rank	Player	Club	Goals
1	(Belgium) Hugo Cuypers	Gent	27
2	(Japan) Ayase Ueda	Cercle Brugge	22
3	(Belgium) Gianni Bruno	Sint-Truiden	18
3	(Netherlands) Vincent Janssen	Antwerp	18
5	(Ghana) Joseph Paintsil	Genk	17
6	(Nigeria) Paul Onuachu	Genk	16
7	(Nigeria) Gift Orban	Gent	15
8	(Belgium) Hans Vanaken	Club Brugge	14
9	(Mali) Dorgeles Nene	Westerlo	13
9	(Spain) Mario González	OH Leuven	13
9	(Spain) Ferran Jutglà	Club Brugge	13

=== Clean sheets ===
Rank	Player	Club	Clean Sheets
1	(France) Jean Butez	Antwerp	20
2	(Belgium) Simon Mignolet	Club Brugge	14
3	(Belgium) Arnaud Bodart	Standard Liège	12
4	(France) Paul Nardi	Gent	11
5	(Turkey) Sinan Bolat	Westerlo	10
6	(Poland) Radosław Majecki	Cercle Brugge	9
6	(Luxembourg) Anthony Moris	Union St Gilloise	9
8	(Romania) Valentin Cojocaru	OH Leuven	8
8	(Burkina Faso) Hervé Koffi	Charleroi	8
8	(Japan) Daniel Schmidt	Sint-Truiden	8
8	(Belgium) Maarten Vandevoordt	Genk	8
8	(Belgium) Bart Verbruggen	Anderlecht	8

=== Top assists ===
Rank	Player	Club	Assists
1	(Belgium) Mike Trésor	Genk	24*
2	(Malta) Teddy Teuma	Union SG	12
3	(Ghana) Joseph Paintsil	Genk	11
4	(Ivory Coast) Simon Adingra	Union SG	9
5	(Togo) Kévin Denkey	Cercle Brugge	8
5	(Belgium) Geoffry Hairemans	Mechelen	8
5	(Belgium) Sven Kums	Gent	8
5	(Algeria) Adem Zorgane	Charleroi	8
5	(Nigeria) Victor Boniface	Union SG	8
5	(Netherlands) Noa Lang	Club Brugge	8

- Trésor's tally of 24 was a new single-season Pro League assists record.

=== Hat-tricks ===
Player	Club	Against	Result	Date
(Bosnia and Herzegovina) Dino Hotić	Cercle Brugge	Gent	4–3 (A)	2 October 2022
(Spain) Mario González	OH Leuven	Zulte Waregem	5–2 (A)	8 October 2022
(Togo) Kévin Denkey	Cercle Brugge	Eupen	5–1 (H)	15 October 2022
(Nigeria) Paul Onuachu^{4}	Genk	Charleroi	4–1 (H)	4 November 2022
(Nigeria) Gift Orban^{4}	Gent	Zulte Waregem	6–2 (A)	12 March 2023
(Belgium) Zinho Gano	Zulte Waregem	Eupen	5–1 (A)	15 April 2023
(Spain) Ferran Jutglà	Club Brugge	Eupen	7–0 (H)	23 April 2023
(Mali) Dorgeles Nene	Westerlo	Cercle Brugge	3–5 (H)	7 May 2023
(Nigeria) Gift Orban	Gent	Cercle Brugge	4–0 (A)	13 May 2023
(Belgium) Hugo Cuypers	Gent	Standard Liege	3–1 (H)	3 June 2023

- ^{4} Player scored four goals.

== Awards ==
=== Annual awards ===
Award	Winner	Club
Player of the Season	(Belgium) Mike Trésor	Genk
Talent of the Season	(Belgium) Arthur Vermeeren	Antwerp
Goal of the Season	(Belgium) Romeo Vermant	Club NXT
Coach of the Season	(Netherlands) Mark van Bommel	Antwerp
Referee of the Season	(Belgium) Jonathan Lardot	—
FSR Project of the Season	Antwerp	Antwerp

Team of the Season
Goalkeeper	(France) Jean Butez (Antwerp)			
Defence	(Belgium) Toby Alderweireld (Antwerp)	(Colombia) Daniel Muñoz (Genk)	(England) Christian Burgess (Union Saint-Gilloise)	(Belgium) Maxim De Cuyper (Westerlo)
Midfield	(Belgium) Mike Trésor (Genk)	(Belgium) Arthur Vermeeren (Antwerp)		(Malta) Teddy Teuma (Union Saint-Gilloise)
Forwards	(Ivory Coast) Simon Adingra (Union Saint-Gilloise)	(Belgium) Hugo Cuypers (Gent)		(Ghana) Joseph Paintsil (Genk)

== Attendances ==
No.	Club	Average	Highest
1	Club Brugge	20,763	29,000
2	Standard de Liège	19,249	27,670
3	Genk	17,638	22,004
4	Anderlecht	16,553	21,500
5	Royal Antwerp	13,957	16,144
6	Gent	13,092	18,418
7	Mechelen	11,983	16,125
8	Zulte Waregem	7,285	12,209
9	Charleroi	6,882	12,288
10	OH Leuven	6,407	9,000
11	RUSG	6,404	8,200
12	Kortrijk	6,282	9,007
13	Westerlo	5,421	8,035
14	STVV	5,308	9,783
15	Cercle Brugge	4,429	12,488
16	Oostende	3,690	5,842
17	Eupen	2,876	7,101
18	Seraing	2,083	4,930
