= 2018–19 Belgian First Division A =

116th season of top-tier football in Belgium

Belgian First Division A
- Season: 2018–19
- Dates: 27 July 2018 – 19 May 2019
- Champions: Genk
- Relegated: Lokeren
- Champions League: Genk; Club Brugge
- Europa League: Standard Liège; Royal Antwerp; Gent
- Top goalscorer: Hamdi Harbaoui (25 goals)
- All statistics correct as of 12 May 2019.

The 2018–19 Belgian First Division A (officially known as Jupiler Pro League) was the 116th season of top-tier football in Belgium.

== Team changes ==
- Mechelen was relegated after finishing last in the 2017–18 Belgian First Division A, ending a streak of 11 seasons at the highest level.
- Cercle Brugge was promoted after winning the promotion play-offs against Beerschot Wilrijk. The club returns to the highest tier three seasons after relegation from the Belgian Pro League in 2014–15.

== Teams ==
=== Stadiums and locations ===
Locations of the 2018–19 Belgian First Division A teams

Matricule	Club	Location	Venue	Capacity
35	Anderlecht	Anderlecht	Constant Vanden Stock Stadium	21,500
1	Antwerp	Antwerp	Bosuilstadion	12,975
12	Cercle Brugge	Bruges	Jan Breydel Stadium	29,042
22	Charleroi	Charleroi	Stade du Pays de Charleroi	14,000
3	Club Brugge	Bruges	Jan Breydel Stadium	29,042
4276	Eupen	Eupen	Kehrweg Stadion	8,363
322	Genk	Genk	Luminus Arena	24,956
7	Gent	Ghent	Ghelamco Arena	20,000
19	Kortrijk	Kortrijk	Guldensporen Stadion	9,399
282	Lokeren	Lokeren	Daknamstadion	12,000
216	Excel Mouscron	Mouscron	Stade Le Canonnier	10,571
31	Oostende	Ostend	Versluys Arena	8,432
373	Sint-Truiden	Sint-Truiden	Stayen	14,600
16	Standard Liège	Liège	Stade Maurice Dufrasne	30,023
4068	Waasland-Beveren	Beveren	Freethiel Stadion	8,190
5381	Zulte Waregem	Waregem	Regenboogstadion	12,500

=== Personnel and kits ===
Club	Manager	Captain	Kit Manufacturer	Sponsors
Anderlecht	(France) Karim Belhocine	(France) Adrien Trebel	Adidas	BNP Paribas Fortis
Antwerp	(Romania) László Bölöni	(Belgium) Faris Haroun	Jako	Heylen Vastgoed
Cercle Brugge	(Belgium) José Jeunechamps	(Belgium) Benjamin Lambot	Erima	ADMB
Charleroi	(Belgium) Felice Mazzu	(Spain) Francisco Martos	Kappa	Proximus
Club Brugge	(Croatia) Ivan Leko	(Netherlands) Ruud Vormer	Macron	Daikin
Eupen	(France) Claude Makélélé	(Spain) Luis García	Nike	Aspire Academy
Excel Mouscron	(Germany) Bernd Storck	(Belgium) Jérémy Huyghebaert	Erima	Star Casino
Genk	(Belgium) Philippe Clement	(Spain) Alejandro Pozuelo	Nike	Beobank
Gent	(Denmark) Jess Thorup	(Ghana) Nana Asare	Craft	vdk bank
Kortrijk	(Belgium) Yves Vanderhaeghe	(Belgium) Hannes Van der Bruggen	Jako	AGO Jobs & HR
Lokeren	(Belgium) Glen De Boeck	(Belgium) Killian Overmeire	Beltona	QTeam
Oostende	(Belgium) Franky Van der Elst	(Belgium) Nicolas Lombaerts	Joma	Willems Veranda's
Sint-Truiden	(Belgium) Marc Brys	(Democratic Republic of the Congo) Jordan Botaka	Olympic	Golden Palace
Standard Liège	(Belgium) Michel Preud'homme	(Belgium) Sébastien Pocognoli	New Balance	BASE
Waasland-Beveren	(Bosnia and Herzegovina) Adnan Čustović	(Netherlands) Milan Massop	Kappa	Circus.be
Zulte-Waregem	(Belgium) Francky Dury	(Belgium) Davy De fauw	Patrick	Willy Naessens Group

=== Managerial changes ===
Team	Outgoing manager	Manner of departure	Date of vacancy	Position	Replaced by	Date of appointment
Sint-Truiden	(Belgium) Jonas De Roeck	Replaced	End of 2017–18 season (Note: The announcement of De Roeck being replaced was made on 20 April 2018, together with the news he would complete the season.)	Pre-season	(Belgium) Marc Brys	21 May 2018
Oostende	(Bosnia and Herzegovina) Adnan Čustović	Replaced	End of 2017–18 season	Pre-season	(Belgium) Gert Verheyen	25 April 2018 (Note: Verheyen was announced as manager on 25 April 2018 but only replaced Adnan Čustović after the final match of the season.)
Cercle Brugge	(Belgium) Franky Vercauteren	Mutual consent	End of 2017–18 season	Pre-season	(France) Laurent Guyot	6 June 2018
Standard Liège	(Portugal) Ricardo Sá Pinto	Resigned	End of 2017–18 season	Pre-season	(Belgium) Michel Preud'homme	23 May 2018
Waasland-Beveren	(Belgium) Dirk Geeraerd	Caretaker replaced	End of 2017–18 season	Pre-season	(Belgium) Yannick Ferrera	8 June 2018
Excel Mouscron	(Belgium) Frank Defays	Sacked	30 August 2018	16th	(Germany) Bernd Storck	2 September 2018
Gent	(Belgium) Yves Vanderhaeghe	Sacked	8 October 2018	7th	(Denmark) Jess Thorup	10 October 2018
Lokeren	(Belgium) Peter Maes	Sacked	27 October 2018	15th	(Iceland) Arnar Viðarsson (caretaker)	27 October 2018
Lokeren	(Iceland) Arnar Viðarsson (caretaker)	Caretaker replaced	2 November 2018 (Note: The announcement of Viðarsson being replaced was made on 29 October 2018, but he remained in charge for the match against Anderlecht on 1 November, with Sollied taking over only the day after.)	16th	(Norway) Trond Sollied	2 November 2018
Waasland-Beveren	(Belgium) Yannick Ferrera	Sacked	11 November 2018	14th	(Bosnia and Herzegovina) Adnan Čustović	17 November 2018
Kortrijk	(Belgium) Glen De Boeck	Sacked	15 November 2018	12th	(Belgium) Yves Vanderhaeghe	15 November 2018
Anderlecht	(Belgium) Hein Vanhaezebrouck	Sacked	16 December 2018	4th	(France) Karim Belhocine (caretaker)	16 December 2018
Anderlecht	(France) Karim Belhocine (caretaker)	Caretaker replaced	6 January 2019	5th	(Netherlands) Fred Rutten	6 January 2019
Lokeren	(Norway) Trond Sollied	Sacked	20 January 2019	16th	(Belgium) Glen De Boeck	20 January 2019
Oostende	(Belgium) Gert Verheyen	Resigned	6 March 2019	14th	(Belgium) Hugo Broos (caretaker)	6 March 2019
Anderlecht	(Netherlands) Fred Rutten	Mutual consent	16 April 2019	Regular season: 4th Championship POs: 5th	(France) Karim Belhocine (caretaker)	16 April 2019
Oostende	(Belgium) Hugo Broos (caretaker)	Resigned	29 April 2019	Regular season: 14th Europa League POs: 4th	(Belgium) Franky Van der Elst (caretaker)	29 April 2019
Cercle Brugge	(France) Laurent Guyot	Mutual consent	2 May 2019	Regular season: 13th Europa League POs: 4th	(Belgium) José Jeunechamps (caretaker)	2 May 2019

== Regular season ==
=== League table ===
Pos	Team	Pld	W	D	L	GF	GA	GD	Pts	Qualification or relegation
1	Genk	30	18	9	3	63	31	+32	63	Qualification for the championship play-offs
2	Club Brugge	30	16	8	6	64	32	+32	56	Qualification for the championship play-offs
3	Standard Liège	30	15	8	7	49	35	+14	53	Qualification for the championship play-offs
4	Anderlecht	30	15	6	9	49	34	+15	51	Qualification for the championship play-offs
5	Gent	30	15	5	10	53	45	+8	50	Qualification for the championship play-offs
6	Antwerp	30	14	7	9	39	34	+5	49	Qualification for the championship play-offs
7	Sint-Truiden	30	12	11	7	47	36	+11	47	Qualification for the Europa League play-offs
8	Kortrijk	30	12	7	11	44	42	+2	43	Qualification for the Europa League play-offs
9	Charleroi	30	12	6	12	43	43	0	42	Qualification for the Europa League play-offs
10	Excel Mouscron	30	11	7	12	33	33	0	40	Qualification for the Europa League play-offs
11	Zulte Waregem	30	8	9	13	49	60	−11	33	Qualification for the Europa League play-offs
12	Eupen	30	10	2	18	34	57	−23	32	Qualification for the Europa League play-offs
13	Cercle Brugge	30	7	7	16	35	59	−24	28	Qualification for the Europa League play-offs
14	Oostende	30	6	9	15	29	52	−23	27	Qualification for the Europa League play-offs
15	Waasland-Beveren	30	5	12	13	37	50	−13	27	Qualification for the Europa League play-offs
16	Lokeren (R)	30	5	5	20	28	53	−25	20	Relegation to First Division B

Source: Belgian First Division A (in Dutch), Soccerway
Rules for classification: 1) Points; 2) Matches won; 3) Goal difference; 4) Goals scored; 5) Away goals scored; 6) Away matches won; 7) Play-off.
(R) Relegated

=== Results ===
Home \ Away	AND	ANT	CER	CHA	CLU	EUP	EXM	GNK	GNT	KVK	LOK	OOS	STA	STR	W-B	ZWA
Anderlecht	—	1–1	4–2	1–1	2–2	2–1	2–0	0–1	2–0	2–0	1–1	5–2	2–1	0–0	3–0	0–0
Antwerp	0–1	—	1–0	1–2	1–1	2–1	2–1	2–4	2–2	0–0	2–1	2–0	1–1	1–3	0–2	5–1
Cercle Brugge	2–1	0–3	—	2–1	2–2	0–1	2–1	2–5	0–3	1–1	3–2	2–2	1–2	1–2	2–0	3–1
Charleroi	1–2	0–1	3–1	—	2–1	1–2	3–1	1–1	2–0	0–2	2–1	1–1	0–1	1–0	2–2	3–2
Club Brugge	2–1	5–1	4–0	0–1	—	5–2	1–2	3–1	1–1	3–0	2–1	4–0	3–0	1–0	1–1	1–3
Eupen	2–1	1–2	2–0	1–4	0–4	—	1–0	0–2	2–3	0–1	4–1	1–2	2–1	1–4	1–0	2–3
Excel Mouscron	3–1	0–1	3–0	3–0	0–1	0–1	—	0–0	3–1	1–0	1–0	2–1	0–0	1–1	0–3	0–0
Genk	1–0	0–0	1–2	3–1	1–1	2–1	1–2	—	3–1	1–1	1–0	2–0	2–0	1–1	3–2	4–0
Gent	1–0	0–0	4–1	2–1	0–4	2–0	1–2	1–5	—	3–1	2–1	2–1	2–1	1–2	4–1	1–1
Kortrijk	1–4	2–0	2–1	1–2	0–0	1–3	1–0	3–3	1–2	—	2–1	1–2	0–2	3–1	2–2	4–2
Lokeren	1–2	2–1	3–1	2–4	0–1	2–0	0–0	0–4	2–2	1–3	—	0–0	0–3	2–0	1–0	0–3
Oostende	0–2	0–2	1–1	2–1	1–2	1–1	2–1	0–2	0–4	1–2	1–0	—	1–3	1–1	1–1	3–1
Standard Liège	2–1	0–2	0–0	0–0	3–1	3–0	1–1	1–1	3–2	2–1	3–1	3–1	—	3–2	4–3	4–1
Sint-Truiden	4–2	2–0	0–0	3–1	2–2	4–1	3–1	2–3	0–2	0–0	1–1	1–0	1–1	—	2–1	2–1
Waasland-Beveren	1–2	0–1	1–1	1–1	2–1	0–0	1–2	1–2	2–1	2–6	2–1	1–1	0–0	2–2	—	1–1
Zulte Waregem	1–2	1–2	3–2	3–1	2–5	4–0	2–2	3–3	1–3	0–2	2–0	1–1	3–1	1–1	2–2	—

Source: Belgian Pro League (in Dutch)
Legend: Blue = home team win; Yellow = draw; Red = away team win.

== Championship play-offs ==
The points obtained during the regular season were halved (and rounded up) before the start of the playoff. As a result, the teams started with the following points before the playoff: Genk 32 points, Club Brugge 28, Standard Liège 27, Anderlecht 26, Gent 25 and Antwerp 25. The points of Genk, Standard Liège, Anderlecht and Antwerp were rounded up, therefore in case of any ties on points at the end of the playoffs, the half point will be deducted for these teams.

=== League table ===
Pos	Team	Pld	W	D	L	GF	GA	GD	Pts	Qualification	GNK	CLU	STA	ANT	GNT	AND
1	Genk (C)	10	6	2	2	19	8	+11	52	Qualification for the Champions League group stage	—	3–1	0–0	4–0	2–1	3–0
2	Club Brugge	10	7	1	2	19	11	+8	50	Qualification for the Champions League third qualifying round	3–2	—	4–0	3–2	3–0	1–0
3	Standard Liège	10	4	1	5	17	16	+1	40	Qualification for the Europa League group stage	1–3	2–0	—	3–1	2–3	5–0 FF (Note: Match was abandoned near the end of the first half as Anderlecht supporters had been throwing flares and smoke bombs on the pitch. At that time Standard was leading 2–0. A few weeks later Anderlecht was fined 5.000 Euro and forced to play one match behind closed doors, with the match result set to a 5–0 win for Standard.)
4	Antwerp (O)	10	4	2	4	12	16	−4	39	Qualification for the Europa League play-off Final	1–0	0–0	2–1	—	1–2	1–1
5	Gent	10	3	1	6	10	15	−5	35	Qualification for the Europa League second qualifying round (Note: After the season, 2018–19 Belgian Cup winners KV Mechelen were found guilty of match-fixing as part of the 2017–18 Belgian football fraud investigation, allowing Standard Liège to enter in the group stage instead of the third qualifying round, the fourth-placed team of the league, Royal Antwerp, entered the third qualifying round instead of the second qualifying round, and the second qualifying round berth was given to the fifth-placed team of the league, Gent. This decision is subject to appeal.)	0–1	0–1	1–2	1–2	—	2–1
6	Anderlecht	10	1	3	6	8	19	−11	32		1–1	2–3	2–1	1–2	0–0	—

Source: Sport.be
Rules for classification: 1) Points; 2) Points without (possible) half points added due to rounding; 3) Position obtained during the Regular season
(C) Champions; (O) Play-off winners

== Europa League play-offs ==
Group A of the play-offs consist of the teams finishing in positions 7, 9, 12 and 14 during the regular season and the first and third placed team in the qualifying positions in the 2018–19 Belgian First Division B. The teams finishing in positions 8, 10, 11, 13 and 15 were joined by the second placed qualifier from the 2018–19 Belgian First Division B in group B.

=== Group A ===
Pos	Team	Pld	W	D	L	GF	GA	GD	Pts	Qualification	CHA	STR	WES	OOS	EUP	B‑W
1	Charleroi	10	7	1	2	20	7	+13	22	Qualification for the Europa League play-off semi-final	—	2–0	2–0	1–2	2–0	4–0
2	Sint-Truiden	10	4	5	1	16	13	+3	17		3–1	—	2–1	1–0	2–2	2–2
3	Westerlo	10	3	3	4	13	12	+1	12		0–2	2–2	—	0–0	1–0	1–1
4	Oostende	10	3	3	4	12	15	−3	12		2–2	1–1	0–3	—	1–2	2–1
5	Eupen	10	3	2	5	9	15	−6	11		0–1	1–1	0–3	3–2	—	1–0
6	Beerschot Wilrijk	10	2	2	6	11	19	−8	8		0–3	1–2	3–2	1–2	2–0	—

Updated to match(es) played on completed. Source:
Rules for classification: 1) Points; 2) Matches won; 3) Goal difference; 4) Goals scored; 5) Away goals scored; 6) Away matches won; 7) Play-off.

=== Group B ===
Pos	Team	Pld	W	D	L	GF	GA	GD	Pts	Qualification	KVK	USG	W‑B	ZWA	EXM	CER
1	Kortrijk	10	8	0	2	26	12	+14	24	Qualification for the Europa League play-off semi-final	—	0–1	2–1	4–2	3–1	4–0
2	Union SG	10	6	2	2	24	14	+10	20		2–0	—	5–1	2–2	3–3	3–1
3	Waasland-Beveren	10	4	1	5	17	24	−7	13		2–3	3–2	—	0–5	2–1	2–1
4	Zulte Waregem	10	3	4	3	22	22	0	13		0–5	2–1	0–0	—	2–2	6–2
5	Excel Mouscron	10	2	2	6	19	22	−3	8		2–3	0–2	2–4	3–0	—	2–3
6	Cercle Brugge	10	2	1	7	16	30	−14	7		1–2	2–3	3–2	3–3	0–3	—

Rules for classification: 1) Points; 2) Matches won; 3) Goal difference; 4) Goals scored; 5) Away goals scored; 6) Away matches won; 7) Play-off.

=== Semi-final ===
The winners of both play-off groups competed in one match to play the fourth-placed team of the championship play-offs for a spot in the final. This match was played on the field of the highest ranked team in the regular competition. Charleroi advanced to the final to play for a spot in the second qualifying round of the 2019–20 UEFA Europa League.

22 May 2019
20:30 CEST

Kortrijk	1–2	Charleroi
Ezekiel 6'	Report	Osimhen 42' 56'

Guldensporen Stadion, Kortrijk
Attendance: 7,500
Referee: Jonathan Lardot

=== Final ===
The winner of the Europa League play-off semi-final and the fourth-placed team of the championship play-offs played one match to determine the Europa League play-off winner. Antwerp qualified for the third qualifying round of the 2019–20 UEFA Europa League.

26 May 2019
14:30 CEST

Antwerp	3–2	Charleroi
Mbokani 16' 67'; Rafaelov 22' (pen.)	Report	Osimhen 1'; Dessoleil 12'

Bosuilstadion, Antwerp
Attendance: 11,502
Referee: Nicolas Laforge

== Number of teams by provinces ==
Number of teams	Province or region	Team(s)
5	West Flanders	Cercle Brugge, Club Brugge, Kortrijk, Oostende and Zulte Waregem
3	East Flanders	Gent, Lokeren and Waasland-Beveren
2	Hainaut	Charleroi and Excel Mouscron
2	Liège	Eupen and Standard Liège
2	Limburg	Genk and Sint-Truiden
1	Antwerp	Antwerp
1	Brussels	Anderlecht

== Season statistics ==
=== Top scorers ===
As of matches played on 17 May 2019.

Rank	Player	Club	Goals
1	(Tunisia) Hamdi Harbaoui	Zulte Waregem	25
2	(Tanzania) Mbwana Samatta	Genk	23
3	(Croatia) Ivan Santini	Anderlecht	16
3	(Nigeria) Victor Osimhen	Charleroi	16
5	(Japan) Daichi Kamada	Sint-Truiden	15
5	(Uruguay) Felipe Avenatti	Kortrijk	15
7	(Belgium) Leandro Trossard	Genk	14
7	(Belgium) Theo Bongonda	Zulte Waregem	14
7	(Belgium) Hans Vanaken	Club Brugge	14
10	(Ukraine) Ruslan Malinovskyi	Genk	13

=== Clean sheets ===
As of matches played on 17 May 2019.

Rank	Player	Club	Clean sheets
1	(Australia) Danny Vukovic	Genk	14
2	(Turkey) Sinan Bolat	Antwerp	13
3	(United States) Ethan Horvath	Club Brugge	11
4	(France) Jean Butez	Excel Mouscron	9
4	(France) Thomas Didillon	Anderlecht	9
4	(Mexico) Guillermo Ochoa	Standard Liège	9
7	(Belgium) Thomas Kaminski	Kortrijk / Gent	8
8	(France) Nicolas Penneteau	Charleroi	7
9	(Belgium) Hendrik Van Crombrugge	Eupen	6
10	(Belgium) Ortwin De Wolf	Lokeren	5

== Awards ==
=== Annual awards ===
Award	Winner	Club
Belgian Professional Footballer of the Year	(Belgium) Hans Vanaken	Club Brugge
Belgian Professional Football Manager of the Year	(Belgium) Philippe Clement	Genk
Belgian Professional Football Young Player of the Year	(Belgium) Yari Verschaeren	Anderlecht

Team of the Season
Goalkeeper	(Turkey) Sinan Bolat (Antwerp)			
Defence	(Belgium) Sébastien Dewaest (Genk)		(Belgium) Brandon Mechele (Club Brugge)	(Japan) Takehiro Tomiyasu (Sint-Truiden)
Midfield	(Norway) Sander Berge (Genk)	(Romania) Răzvan Marin (Standard Liège)	(Ukraine) Ruslan Malinovskyi (Genk)	(Belgium) Hans Vanaken (Club Brugge)
Attack	(Tanzania) Mbwana Samatta (Genk)		(Brazil) Wesley Moraes (Club Brugge)	(Belgium) Leandro Trossard (Genk)

== Attendances ==
No.	Club	Average attendance	Change	Highest
1	Club Brugge	24,399	-6,8%	27,672
2	Standard de Liège	22,929	4,3%	27,245
3	Anderlecht	19,102	-0,9%	21,000
4	Genk	18,700	19,7%	23,624
5	Gent	17,250	-7,1%	20,000
6	Royal Antwerp	13,040	6,8%	15,408
7	Charleroi	8,341	-20,6%	12,653
8	Zulte Waregem	7,533	-14,5%	10,756
9	STVV	6,302	-1,5%	14,000
10	Kortrijk	6,163	-11,0%	9,127
11	Cercle Brugge	5,658	-0,2%	13,222
12	Oostende	4,790	-17,0%	7,500
13	Lokeren	4,541	-21,0%	7,070
14	Mouscron	3,655	-33,5%	8,872
15	Waasland-Beveren	3,547	-22,8%	6,957
16	Eupen	2,683	-19,1%	5,522
