= Defays =

Defays (French pronunciation: [də.fa.i], [də.fa.is]) is a Walloon family name of Latin origin. Notable people with the surname include:

- Frank Defays (born 1974), Belgian football player and manager
- Jean-Marc Defays, Belgian linguist
- Lucien Defays (1863–1949), Belgian politician
- Pierre Richard (real name Pierre-Richard Maurice Charles Léopold Defays, born 1934), French actor and film director
