= Rikelmi =

Brazilian footballer

- Rikelmi with ABC in 2026

Personal information
- Full name: Rikelmi Valentim dos Santos
- Date of birth: 14 August 2001 (age 25)
- Place of birth: São Paulo, Brazil
- Height: 1.63 m (5 ft 4 in)
- Position: Forward

Team information
- Current team: ABC

Youth career
- 2012–2017: Portuguesa
- 2017–2018: Internacional

Senior career*
Years	Team	Apps	(Gls)
2018–2019	Nacional-SP	1	(0)
2019–2021	Juventus-SP	2	(0)
2020–2021	→ Botafogo (loan)	0	(0)
2022–2024	Botafogo	6	(1)
2022–2024	→ RWD Molenbeek (loan)	12	(2)
2025	Paraná	11	(1)
2025	Capital	12	(1)
2025	Londrina	2	(0)
2026	São José-SP	18	(3)
2026–	ABC	17	(1)
- * Club domestic league appearances and goals as of 10 November 2026

Rikelmi Valentim dos Santos (born 14 August 2001), simply known as Rikelmi, is a Brazilian footballer who plays as a forward for ABC.

== Career ==
Born in São Paulo, Rikelmi began his career with Portuguesa's youth setup, and later represented Internacional before making his senior debut with Nacional-SP in the 2018 Copa Paulista. He moved to Juventus-SP in 2019, making two first team appearances in the following year.

In 2020, Rikelmi was loaned to Botafogo until the end of 2021. On 7 December 2021, he was bought outright by the club, signing a contract until December 2024.

Rikelmi made his first team debut for Fogão on 25 January 2022, coming on as a second-half substitute for Juninho in a 1–1 Campeonato Carioca away draw against Boavista. He scored his first goal for the club on 7 March, netting the third in a 5–0 home routing of Volta Redonda.

Rikelmi made his debut in the top tier of Brazilian football on 29 May 2022, replacing Daniel Borges late into a 0–1 away loss against Coritiba. On 25 August, he was loaned to RWD Molenbeek in Belgium.

Rikelmi left Molenbeek in July 2024, and spent nearly five months without a club before signing for Paraná on 27 November of that year. The following 26 February, despite suffering relegation, he moved to Capital.

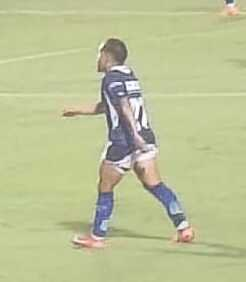
Rikelmi playing for São José-SP in 2026

On 16 July 2025, Rikelmi was announced at Londrina. On 14 November, after achieving promotion, he agreed to a deal with São José-SP.

== Personal life ==
Rikelmi was named after Juan Román Riquelme.

== Career statistics ==
As of 22 April 2026.

Club	Season	League			State League		Cup		Continental		Other		Total	
Club	Season	Division	Apps	Goals	Apps	Goals	Apps	Goals	Apps	Goals	Apps	Goals	Apps	Goals
Nacional-SP	2018	Paulista A2	—		0	0	—		—		5 (Note: Appearance(s) in Copa Paulista)	0	5	0
Nacional-SP	2019	Paulista A2	—		1	0	—		—		—		1	0
Nacional-SP	Total		—		1	0	—		—		5	0	6	0
Juventus-SP	2020	Paulista A2	—		2	0	—		—		—		2	0
Botafogo	2022	Série A	1	0	5	1	1	0	—		—		7	1
RWD Molenbeek	2022–23	Challenger Pro League	4	2	—		1	1	—		—		5	3
RWD Molenbeek	2023–24	Belgian Pro League	8	0	—		1	0	—		—		9	0
RWD Molenbeek	Total		12	2	—		2	1	—		—		14	3
Paraná	2025	Paranaense	—		11	1	—		—		—		11	1
Capital	2025	Série D	8	0	4	1	2	1	—		—		14	2
Londrina	2025	Série C	2	0	—		—		—		—		2	0
São José	2026	Paulista A2	—		18	3	—		—		—		18	3
Career total			23	2	41	6	5	2	0	0	5	0	74	10

== Honours ==
RWD Molenbeek

- Challenger Pro League: 2022–23
