= Robin Veldman =

Dutch football manager

Personal information
- Date of birth: 24 December 1985 (age 40)
- Place of birth: Marknesse, Netherlands

Team information
- Current team: Heerenveen (manager)

Managerial career
- Years: Team
- 2022: Anderlecht (caretaker)
- 2022–2023: Anderlecht (assistant)
- 2023: Queen's Park
- 2024–2025: Club NXT
- 2025–: Heerenveen

Robin Veldman (born 24 December 1985) is a Dutch football manager who is the manager of SC Heerenveen in the Eredivisie.

== Early life ==
Veldman was born and raised in the Flevopolder. He played for SV Markesse.

== Career ==
=== Youth coach ===
Veldman started his career as a youth coach for SV Marknesse. He spent 11 years at SC Heerenveen, where he worked with players including Hakim Ziyech. He then became a trainer for AFC Ajax, where he worked with the youth team.

In 2021, Veldman was hired to work with the Anderlecht U21 team.

=== Managerial career ===
In 2022, Veldman was appointed interim head coach of Belgian side Anderlecht.

In 2023, he was appointed manager of Scottish side Queen's Park.

On 19 March 2024, Veldman was hired by Club Brugge to manage their reserve team Club NXT in Challenger Pro League.

On 21 March 2025, Veldman returned to Heerenveen to become their new permanent manager after Feyenoord signed Robin van Persie to replace Brian Priske as their new manager.

=== Managerial record ===
As of match played 9 December 2023

Team	From	To	Record				
Team	From	To	G	W	D	L	Win %
Anderlecht (interim)	24 October 2022	1 December 2022	6	3	2	1	50.00
Queen's Park	17 June 2023	9 December 2023	21	5	4	12	23.81
Total			27	8	6	13	29.63
