= Takahisa Shiraishi =

Japanese footballer and manager

Personal information
- Date of birth: 28 October 1975 (age 51)
- Place of birth: Takamatsu, Kagawa, Japan
- Height: 1.70 m (5 ft 7 in)
- Position: Forward

Youth career
- Meiji University
- 1996–2000: Gimnasia

Senior career*
Years	Team	Apps	(Gls)
2000–2001	Nice II		
2001–2002	Blagnac		
2002–2003	Hyères		

Managerial career
- 2012–2013: Sant Gabriel Women
- 2013–2014: Gavà (assistant)
- 2015–2016: Europa (assistant)
- 2016: Europa (interim)
- 2018–2019: Excelsior (assistant)
- 2019: Sint-Truiden (assistant)
- 2022: Deinze
- * Club domestic league appearances and goals

Takahisa Shiraishi (白石 尚久, Shiraishi Takahisa; born 28 October 1975) is a Japanese football manager.

== Playing career ==
Shiraishi was born in Takamatsu, Kagawa, and only began playing football in his last year of high school.

After failing to break into the Meiji University football team in his native Japan, Shiraishi moved to Argentina, where he spent four years with Gimnasia. After failing to settle at Gimnasia, where his money and clothes were stolen regularly, he moved to France, where he played semi-professionally for three years.

== Managerial career ==
Having not succeeded as a player, Shiraishi decided to go into football management, and would spend time at Feyenoord and Arsenal, before working as a coach for the Barcelona youth teams. After coaching the youth teams of fellow Spanish side Sant Gabriel, he was invited to manage the women's team, where he served between 2012 and 2013. Following this, he had spells as the assistant coach at Gavà and Europa. While at Europa, he served as interim coach after the departure of Albert Poch, until the arrival of Joan Esteva.

He worked with Keisuke Honda as a performance analyst during the former Japanese international's time with AC Milan and Pachuca.

In June 2018 he was named assistant manager of Dutch club Excelsior. A year later, in September 2019, he was named assistant to Nicky Hayen at the academy of Belgian club Sint-Truiden. When Hayen was named interim manager of the first team in November of the same year, Shiraishi followed suit.

Following the acquisition of Belgian club K.M.S.K. Deinze by Singaporean investment group ACA Football Partners in February 2022, Shiraishi was named director of football at the club. When head coach Wim De Decker left his role in May 2022, Shiraishi was named as his replacement. However, he only lasted seven games before leaving in September of the same year.

== Managerial statistics ==
As of 13 October 2022.

Managerial record by team and tenure
Team	From	To	Record				
Team	From	To	P	W	D	L	Win %
Deinze	1 July 2022	28 September 2022	6	0	0	6	0.0
Total			6	0	0	6	0.0
