= Wouter Vrancken =

Belgian manager and former footballer

- Vrancken in 2026

Personal information
- Date of birth: 3 February 1979 (age 47)
- Place of birth: Sint-Truiden, Limburg, Belgium
- Height: 1.85 m (6 ft 1 in)
- Position: Midfielder

Team information
- Current team: Heart of Midlothian (head coach)

Senior career*
| Years | Team | Apps | (Gls) |
| 1997–2004 | Sint-Truidense | 173 | (14) |
| 2004–2006 | Gent | 61 | (9) |
| 2006–2008 | Genk | 56 | (10) |
| 2009–2010 | Mechelen | 35 | (3) |
| 2010 | Kortrijk | 10 | (0) |

International career
| 1997 | Belgium U18 | 1 | (0) |
| 2000–2002 | Belgium U21 | 17 | (0) |

Managerial career
- 2009–2011: RDK Gravelo
- 2011–2013: Overpelt VV
- 2014–2017: Thes
- 2017: Lommel
- 2018–2022: Mechelen
- 2022–2024: Genk
- 2024–2025: Gent
- 2025–2026: Sint-Truiden
- 2026–: Heart of Midlothian
- * Club domestic league appearances and goals

Wouter Vrancken (born 3 February 1979) is a Belgian football manager and a former defensive midfielder who is the head coach of Scottish Premiership club Heart of Midlothian.

== Playing career ==
Wouter Vrancken started his playing career as a youth at lower division clubs, beginning at Oud Groot Gelmen, progressing through Concordia Duras, Sporting Aalst-Brustem and KSK Tongeren, before ending up in the Belgian top flight with home-town club Sint-Truiden. During the build-up to the 1997–98 season, Vrancken moved on from the youths set-up into the Sint-Truiden first team at the age of 18.

Vrancken made his professional debut on 13 September 1997, in the First Division against RWDM. Vrancken initially combined football with studying for a Bachelors in PE, but was soon urged by STVV coach Poll Peters to stop his studies and concentrate on his football career instead. After his first season in the Belgian Pro League, Vrancken was attracting interest from Racing Genk, but STVV did not follow through on a deal.

After eight seasons at the Stayen, Vrancken moved to Gent, forming a good midfield partnership with Mbark Boussoufa for one season together, before both secured transfers elsewhere: Boussoufa to Anderlecht, Vrancken to Genk, who finally came good on their previous interest. Vrancken immediately became vice national champion in his first season with Genk, 2006–07, finishing runners-up five points behind champions Anderlecht.

Having enjoyed two seasons in Limburg, Vrancken moved to Mechelen in August 2008, signing a four-year deal. 18 months into his time with the Yellow-Reds, Vrancken moved to Georges Leekens-coached Kortrijk during the 2009–10 winter break in a player-exchange, with Tom Soetaers going in the opposite direction. But after only managing ten league appearances in the calendar year of 2010, Vrancken was forced to retire from football through a persistent hip injury and osteoarthritis at the age of 31 on advice from KVK’s then coach Hein Vanhaezebrouck. Vrancken had his contract with Kortrijk dissolved in October 2010, barely nine months after moving from Mechelen.

== Coaching career ==
=== Start of coaching career ===
After seven years coaching in the lower divisions, beginning with part-time roles in the fourth division at RDK Gravelo and Overpelt VV while working in accountancy, Vrancken had a one-year spell back in the top-flight as assistant to Glen De Boeck at Kortrijk for the 2017–18 season.

=== Mechelen ===
Vrancken took charge at recently-relegated Mechelen in the summer of 2018, guiding the club back to the Belgian Pro League at the first attempt, winning Division 1B and the 2018–19 Belgian Cup, beating Gent 2–1 in the final at the King Baudouin Stadium. Mechelen are the first club ever to do such a double, and only the second club in history from outside the Belgian top-flight to win the Cup.

However, due to match-fixing investigations from the season Mechelen were relegated (2017–18) prior to Vrancken's hiring, the Yellow-Reds were not allowed defend the Cup or to play in the 2019–20 UEFA Europa League.

Vrancken steered Mechelen into top-eight finishes for the next three seasons - the highest being sixth in the curtailed 2019–20 season - but feeling the club were not ambitious enough to start competing higher up the table, departed for Racing Genk in the summer of 2022.

=== Racing Genk ===
Losing their opening game of the season 3–2 away to champions Club Brugge, Genk then went on an unbeaten run of 15 games, winning 14, propelling them to the top of the 2022–23 Belgian Pro League. They would stay top to the end of the regular season, qualifying Racing for the 2023–24 UEFA Europa Conference League, ahead of the 2022–23 title play-offs against Union St-Gilloise, Royal Antwerp and Club Brugge.

Vrancken was named Coach of the Year for 2022 at the Belgian Golden Shoe Awards, off the back of their long unbeaten run. After split of points according to the rules of the Championship Playoffs, Genk lost some ground in the final run-in, but was in contention for the title in the last round along with Royal Union and Antwerp. In the final minutes, Antwerp won the title while Racing finished second.

Genk failed to reach the CL group stage, as well as Europa League group stage and moved to Conference League group stage but failed to progress. The team secured the Championship Playoffs in the Jupiler Pro League on the last day of the regular season. Midway through the Championship Playoffs, Vrancken expressed desire to depart next season resulting in him being sacked by the club three rounds before the end of the championship.

=== Gent ===
On 5 June 2024, he became the head coach of Gent. He then departed the club on 21 January 2025.

=== Sint-Truiden ===
In April that year, he was appointed as head coach of Sint-Truiden. Vrancken secured a third placed league finish for Sint-Truiden, their highest position in sixty years and secured European football. He was named as coach of the year, before leaving the club to seek other opportunities.

=== Heart of Midlothian ===
On 25 June 2026, Vrancken was appointed as head coach of Scottish club Heart of Midlothian; becoming the first Belgian to assume the position. As part of the move, he brought in Tim Smolders and Céderique Tulleners.

Vrancken managed his first match at Hearts, coming against Sturm Graz, losing 4-0 in the first leg of the UEFA Champions League's second qualifying round. Defeats against Sturm Graz and Benfica saw the club eliminated to the UEFA Conference League. He managed his first league match for Hearts in the losing effort against Aberdeen in the opening game of the season. But Vrancken won his first league match for the club, beating Dundee United a week later. Vrancken led Hearts to qualifying for the UEFA Conference League phase after beating Rapid Wien 4-3 on penalties following a 2-2 draw.

== Managerial statistics ==
As of match played 21 November 2026

Managerial record by team and tenure
| Team | From | To | Record | | | | |
| Team | From | To | G | W | D | L | Win % |
|---|---|---|---|---|---|---|---|
| Lommel | 1 July 2017 | 28 October 2017 | 11 | 7 | 2 | 2 | 63.64 |
| Mechelen | 21 August 2018 | 30 June 2022 | 145 | 70 | 31 | 44 | 48.28 |
| Genk | 1 July 2022 | 9 May 2024 | 94 | 47 | 25 | 22 | 50.00 |
| Gent | 1 July 2024 | 20 January 2025 | 36 | 17 | 9 | 10 | 47.22 |
| Sint-Truidense | 15 April 2025 | 24 May 2026 | 45 | 24 | 6 | 15 | 53.33 |
| Heart of Midlothian | 25 June 2026 | Present | 25 | 9 | 6 | 10 | 36.00 |
| Career total | | | 356 | 174 | 79 | 103 | 48.88 |

== Honours ==
=== Manager ===
Mechelen

- Belgian Cup: 2018–19

Racing Genk

- Belgian Pro League: runner-up 2022–23

Individual

- Belgian Golden Shoe: Best Coach of the Calendar Year: 2022
