= Kristoffer Andersen =

Belgian former footballer (born 1985)

Personal information
- Date of birth: 9 December 1985 (age 40)
- Place of birth: Etterbeek, Belgium
- Height: 1.83 m (6 ft 0 in)
- Position: Midfielder

Youth career
- 1992–2000: Eupen
- 2000–2001: Anderlecht
- 2001: Eupen
- 2001–2004: Standard Liège

Senior career*
Years	Team	Apps	(Gls)
2004–2005	Eupen	33	(4)
2005–2007	Brussels	24	(1)
2007–2008	B. Mönchengladbach II	43	(8)
2008–2009	VfR Aalen	27	(1)
2009–2010	MSV Duisburg	23	(0)
2010–2011	VfL Osnabrück	24	(3)
2011–2012	Ingolstadt 04	2	(0)
2012–2013	Alemannia Aachen	25	(0)
2013–2019	Fortuna Köln	107	(5)

Managerial career
- 2021: Alemannia Aachen
- 2022: Eupen (caretaker)
- 2024: Eupen (caretaker)
- * Club domestic league appearances and goals

Kristoffer Andersen (born 9 December 1985) is a retired Belgian footballer who played as a midfielder, and who is currently caretaker coach in charge of Belgian Pro League side Eupen for the second time. Andersen has both Danish and Belgian citizenship.

== Early life ==
Andersen is the son of Henrik Andersen and a Belgian mother. He was born in 1985 in the Brussels suburb of Etterbeek, as Henrik Andersen at the time was playing at Anderlecht. As Henrik Andersen 1990 moved to 1. FC Köln, the family moved to Eupen, which lies near the border to Germany. After Henrik Andersen finished his career in 1998, the family remained in Eupen.

== Playing career ==
At the end of the 2018–19 season, Andersen retired after 15 years playing in Belgium and Germany for clubs in the top two divisions of both countries.

== Coaching career ==
After a brief time in charge of Alemannia Aachen in 2021, for whom he had previously played, Andersen had two spells in temporary charge across the border at Eupen.
