= Brian Priske =

Danish footballer and manager (born 1977)

Personal information
- Full name: Brian Priske Pedersen
- Date of birth: 14 May 1977 (age 49)
- Place of birth: Horsens, Denmark
- Height: 1.88 m (6 ft 2 in)
- Position: Defender

Team information
- Current team: Sparta Prague (manager)

Youth career
- Stensballe
- –1996: Horsens fS

Senior career*
Years	Team	Apps	(Gls)
1996–1997	AC Horsens	46	(12)
1997–1999	Aarhus Fremad	50	(5)
1999–2003	AaB	163	(1)
2003–2005	Genk	68	(1)
2005–2006	Portsmouth	30	(0)
2006–2008	Club Brugge	64	(0)
2008–2011	Vejle	61	(0)
2010	→ Midtjylland (loan)	17	(1)
2011	Start	15	(1)
Total		468	(8)

International career
1998–1999	Denmark U21	15	(0)
2003–2007	Denmark	24	(0)

Managerial career
- 2019–2021: Midtjylland
- 2021–2022: Royal Antwerp
- 2022–2024: Sparta Prague
- 2024–2025: Feyenoord
- 2025–: Sparta Prague
- * Club domestic league appearances and goals

Brian Priske Pedersen (Danish pronunciation: [ˈpʁiːæn ˈpʰʁiskə ˈpʰe̝(ː)ðɐsn̩]; born 14 May 1977) is a Danish professional football manager and former player, who is the head coach of Czech First League club Sparta Prague. Priske played as a defender during his playing career.

He played 24 matches for the Denmark national football team from 2003 to 2007, and represented Denmark at UEFA Euro 2004. As a manager, he started his career at Midtjylland, winning the Danish Superliga title before being appointed by Belgian club Royal Antwerp where he departed after one season and signed with Czech club Sparta Prague. After winning three trophies with the club, he was appointed by Dutch side Feyenoord but was sacked after half a season in charge. In June 2025, he returned to Sparta Prague as manager.

He is the father of footballer August Priske.

== Club career ==
Born in Horsens, Priske started his career for Danish club Stensballe, a Horsens suburb club. Still a youth, he moved to Horsens Forenede Sportsklubber (HFS), now called AC Horsens. He moved on to Aarhus in 1997, before settling at AaB in 1999. There, he won the Danish Superliga championship in 1999, and captained the club at the end of his tenure. He moved to Belgian club Genk in the summer of 2003.

When he played the full match in Denmark's 4–1 win over England on 17 August 2005, Priske aroused the interest of several Premiership clubs, and he joined Portsmouth five days later for an undisclosed fee, signing a three-year deal. Priske was given a good run in the Portsmouth side by Alain Perrin, but after Perrin was sacked that November, Priske was dropped by returning manager Harry Redknapp. Many Portsmouth supporters assumed that this was because of Redknapp's disdain of using players he himself had not purchased, and speculation was rife in the January transfer window that Priske would be leaving the club.

A move away from Fratton Park never materialized, however, and following Portsmouth's poor run of form and injuries to several defenders, Priske was returned to the side for match against Manchester City on 11 March. Priske was from then an ever-present as Portsmouth then went on an excellent run of form for their final ten matches of the season, earning the club Premiership survival for another year. Since arriving from Genk, Priske had been a popular player amongst Portsmouth supporters. Many were originally unhappy that Priske had been frozen-out of the team with Redknapp's return, and felt justified in their valuation of the player after the impressive role he played in earning the club survival from relegation.

Priske had become a fan favourite since his arrival at Fratton Park as a result of his impressive form, but in spite of this, rumours of his departure from the south coast resurfaced during the 2006–07 pre-season. Priske revealed to the Danish media that he had been told to find a new club before the start of the next season before returning to Belgium, joining Club Brugge in August 2006. The news was met with confusion and anger among Portsmouth fans. In Bruges, Priske competed with fan favourites Olivier De Cock and Birger Maertens for a place in the starting line-up. Priske became a first team regular, and helped the team win the 2007 Belgian Cup.

In the summer of 2008, Priske returned to the Danish Superliga to play for Vejle. He could not save the club from relegation to the Danish 1st Division in 2009, but stayed with the team. In the summer of 2010, he was loaned out to Superliga club Midtjylland. On 21 January 2011, he signed for Start.

== International career ==
While at AaB, Priske made his debut for the Danish national team in February 2003. He was a part of the Danish squad at the Euro 2004, and played 14 minutes in the 0–0 group game with Italy, coming on as a substitute to replace Christian Poulsen. Following retirement and injuries in the Danish defense, Priske became a more consistent member of the national team. In the 2006 World Cup qualification stage he played 10 out of 12 matches, though Denmark did not qualify for the finals. He played one game in the UEFA Euro 2008 qualification, a 1–2 loss to Northern Ireland in November 2007, after which he was dropped from the national team.

== Managerial career ==
=== Midtjylland ===
Priske served as assistant of Midtjylland and Copenhagen from 2011 to 2019. When Kenneth Andersen resigned as manager of Midtjylland on 19 August 2019, Priske succeeded him. At first, he was a caretaker manager for eleven games, until he got promoted to a head coach. In his first campaign as a head coach in the 2019–20 season, Priske and Midtjylland won the Danish Championship 14 points ahead of second place Copenhagen, despite only having half of their budget. By winning the championship, Priske and Midtjylland had to play three rounds of UEFA Champions League qualification matches to get to the Champions league group stages. They beat Ludogorets 1–0, Young Boys 3–0 and then on 30 September 2020 they beat Slavia Prague 4–1.

=== Royal Antwerp ===
On 29 May 2021, Priske signed a new contract for two seasons with Royal Antwerp.

=== Sparta Prague ===
On 31 May 2022, Priske was named the new head coach of Sparta Prague. On 23 May 2023, Sparta Prague drew 0–0 with Slovácko to clinch their first Czech First League title in nine years. They also reached the final of the Czech cup that season. Priske became the first foreign manager to win the Czech league (excluding Slovaks Jozef Jarabinský and Jozef Chovanec). He was chosen as manager of the 2022–23 season by the League Football Association (LFA).

On 20 October 2023, Priske extended his contract with Sparta Prague until 2026. On 14 December 2023, Priske and AC Sparta Prague qualified for the knockout stages of the UEFA Europa League after beating Aris Limassol 3–1 and finishing second in a group also featuring Real Betis and Rangers. After advancing past Galatasaray in the knockout stages (6–4 on aggregate), they were knocked out by Liverpool in the Round of 16 (2–11 on aggregate). On 18 May 2024, Sparta Prague won 5–0 at Mladá Boleslav to clinch the Czech First League title for the second time in two years. Sparta also won Czech Cup. Priske was chosen as the manager of the 2023–24 season by League Football Association (LFA).

=== Feyenoord ===
On 12 June 2024, Dutch club Feyenoord announced that it had signed Priske as the club's new head coach on a three-year contract. In Priske's first official game as Feyenoord head coach on 4 August 2024, Feyenoord beat PSV Eindhoven on penalties after a 4–4 draw to win the Johan Cruyff Shield. Priske initially implemented a 3–4–3 formation, but changed that to a 4–3–3 formation after criticism and a 1–1 draw in the first league game against promoted side Willem II. However, in September 2024, Feyenoord continued to drop points and suffered a 0–4 defeat against Bayer Leverkusen in the UEFA Champions League. In October 2024, Feyenoord won away games against Girona and Benfica in the Champions League and beat Twente, Go Ahead Eagles and Utrecht in the Eredivisie, before losing De Klassieker to Ajax. In the remainder of 2024, Feyenoord won five of their seven games in the Eredivisie and came back from 3–0 down to draw 3–3 against Manchester City and beat Priske's former club Sparta Prague in the Champions League. After Feyenoord started 2025 with a defeat against Utrecht and a draw against Willem II, there were rumours Priske would leave the club after the home game against Bayern Munich in the Champions League. However, after Feyenoord won that game 3–0 to qualify for the knockout phase, he remained Feyenoord's head coach. In the following weeks, Feyenoord suffered their largest-ever Champions League defeat against Lille (6–1), lost away to Ajax in the Eredivisie and were knocked out in the KNVB Cup quarter-finals by PSV Eindhoven. On 10 February 2025, two days after a 3–0 win in the Rotterdam derby against Sparta Rotterdam, Priske was sacked as head coach following "inconsistent results and a lack progress".

=== Sparta Prague ===
On 8 June 2025, Priske was appointed again as Sparta Prague manager, signed a multi-year contract.

== Personal life ==
His son August Priske is also a professional footballer.

== Honours ==
=== Player ===
AaB

- Danish Superliga: 1998–99

Club Brugge

- Belgian Cup: 2007

=== Manager ===
Midtjylland

- Danish Superliga: 2019–20

Sparta Prague

- Czech First League: 2022–23, 2023–24
- Czech Cup: 2023–24

Feyenoord

- Johan Cruyff Shield: 2024
