= José Jeunechamps =

Belgian footballer and manager

Personal information
- Date of birth: 2 May 1967 (age 59)
- Place of birth: Verviers, Belgium
- Position: Goalkeeper

Team information
- Current team: Dender EH

Senior career*
Years	Team	Apps	(Gls)
- Stade Waremmien

Managerial career
- 2004–2007: Seraing U23
- 2008–2012: Standard Liège B
- 2012–2015: Metz (assistant)
- 2016: Charlton Athletic (assistant)
- 2016: Seraing
- 2017: Standard Liège (caretaker)
- 2017: Standard Liège B
- 2017–2019: Cercle Brugge (assistant)
- 2019: Cercle Brugge (caretaker)
- 2019–2020: OH Leuven (assistant)
- 2021: Antwerp (assistant)
- 2021: Mouscron (assistant)
- 2021–2022: Mouscron
- 2022: Seraing
- 2023: Virton
- 2023: Dender EH (assistant)
- 2023–: Standard Liège (assistant)
- * Club domestic league appearances and goals

José Jeunechamps (born 2 May 1967) is a Belgian professional football manager and former player who played as a goalkeeper. He is currently assistant manager of Belgian Pro League club Standard Liège.
