= Frank Defays =

Belgian footballer

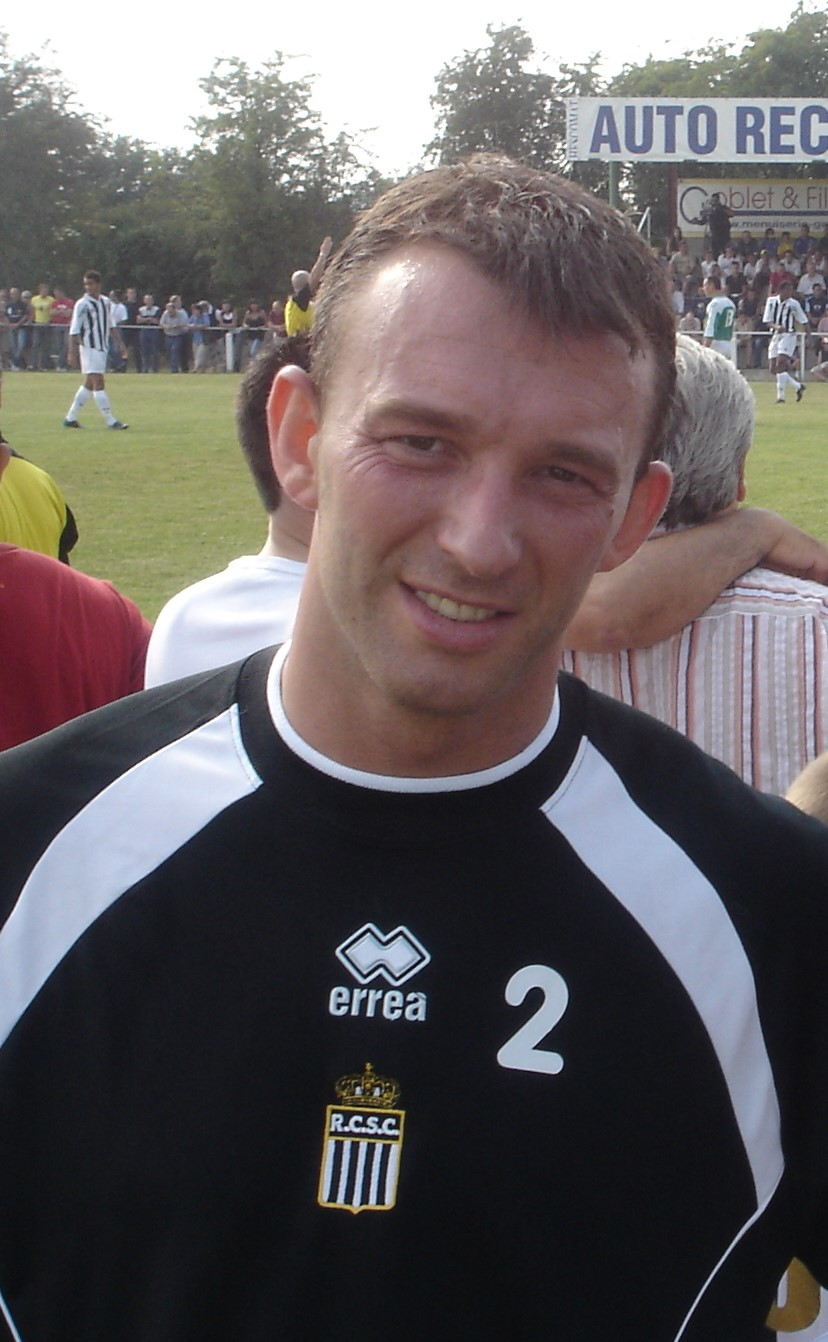
- Defays with Charleroi

Personal information
- Date of birth: 23 February 1974 (age 52)
- Place of birth: Namur, Belgium
- Height: 1.85 m (6 ft 1 in)
- Position: Defender

Team information
- Current team: Charleroi (assistant)

Senior career*
Years	Team	Apps	(Gls)
1999–2009	Charleroi	285	(10)
2009–2010	F91 Dudelange	8	(2)
Total		293	(12)

Managerial career
- 2011–2018: Virton
- 2018: Excel Mouscron
- 2019: Racing Union
- 2019–: Charleroi (assistant)
- 2022: Charleroi (interim)
- * Club domestic league appearances and goals

Frank Defays (born 23 February 1974, in Namur) is a Belgian football manager and former player who is assistant manager of Charleroi in the Belgian First Division A. A defender, he played for Belgian clubs R.E.S. Jambes (1980–1988), UR Namur (1988–1999) and Charleroi (1999–2009), and for F91 Dudelange (2009–2010) of Luxembourg.
